= Boxing at the 1958 Asian Games – Men's 67 kg =

Boxing competitions

Men's 67 kg at the 1958 Asian Games
- Venue: Korakuen Ice Palace
- Date: 29–31 May 1958
- Competitors: 8 from 8 nations

Medalists
| gold medal | Kim Ki-soo | South Korea |
| silver medal | Soren Pirjanian | Iran |
| bronze medal | Toshiro Onuki | Japan |
| bronze medal | Tongchai Teptani | Thailand |

The men's welterweight (67 kilograms) event at the 1958 Asian Games took place from 29 to 31 May 1958 at Korakuen Ice Palace, Tokyo, Japan.

== Schedule ==
All times are Japan Standard Time (UTC+09:00)

| Date | Time | Event |
|---|---|---|
| Thursday, 29 May 1958 | 14:00 | Quarterfinals |
| Friday, 30 May 1958 | 18:00 | Semifinals |
| Saturday, 31 May 1958 | 18:00 | Final |

== Results ==
Legend

- PTS — Won by points

Quarterfinals
Toshiro Onuki (JPN) | PTS
M. Ranganathan (IND)
Soren Pirjanian (IRN) | PTS
Norberto David (PHI)
Tongchai Teptani (THA) | PTS
Lu Chih-yu (ROC)
Kim Ki-soo (KOR) | PTS
Terrence Oung (BIR)

Semifinals
Toshiro Onuki (JPN)
Soren Pirjanian (IRN) | PTS
Tongchai Teptani (THA)
Kim Ki-soo (KOR) | PTS

Final
Soren Pirjanian (IRN)
Kim Ki-soo (KOR) | PTS
