= Jim Oliver =

Jim Oliver may refer to:

- Jim Oliver (baseball) (1919–1971), American baseball player
- Jim Oliver (footballer) (born 1941), Scottish former footballer
- Jim Oliver (novelist), American novelist

== See also ==
- Jimmy Oliver (disambiguation)
- James Oliver (disambiguation)
- Jamie Oliver (disambiguation)
