= Boxing at the 1948 Summer Olympics – Middleweight =

Boxing competitions

Men's middleweight at the Games of the XIV Olympiad
- Venue: Earl's Court; Wembley Arena
- Date: 7–13 August 1948
- Competitors: 25 from 25 nations

Medalists
1st place, gold medalist(s)		László Papp	Hungary
2nd place, silver medalist(s)		Johnny Wright	Great Britain
3rd place, bronze medalist(s)		Ivano Fontana	Italy

The men's middleweight boxing competition at the 1948 Olympic Games in London was held from 7 to 13 August at the Empress Hall in Earl's Court and the Wembley Arena.

== Competition format ==
Like all Olympic boxing events, the competition was a straight single-elimination tournament. The competition began with a preliminary round on 7 August, where the number of competitors was reduced to 16, and concluded with a final on 13 August. As there were fewer than 32 boxers in the competition, a number of boxers received a bye for the preliminary round. All bouts consisted of three periods where the boxers received points for every successful punch they land on their opponent's head or upper body. The boxer with the most points at the end of the bouts wins. If a boxer is knocked to the ground and cannot get up before the referee counts to 10, then the bout is over and the opponent wins by knockout.

== Results ==
Round of 32
Valle Resko (FIN)
László Papp (HUN)	KO-2
Tore Karlsson (SWE)
Hossein Tousi (IRN)	PTS
Jack Keenan (CAN)
Mick McKeon (IRL)	PTS
Martin Hansen (DEN)	KO-1
Evert Johanson (NOR)
Aimé-Joseph Escudie (FRA)	PTS
Ken La Grange (RSA)
Moustafa Fahim (EGY)	RSC-2
Jaime Oliver (ESP)
Miloslav Příhoda (TCH)
Jan Schubart (NED)	PTS
Hermann Schneider (SUI)
Johnny Wright (GBR)	PTS
Graham Higham (AUS)
Héctor García (ARG)	PTS

Round of 16
Dogomar Martínez (URU)	PTS
Antoni Kolczyński (POL)
John Nuttall (IND)
Ivano Fontana (ITA)	PTS
Washington Jones (USA)
Auguste Cavignac (BEL)	DSQ-2
Jeannot Welter (LUX)
László Papp (HUN)	RSC-1
Hossein Tousi (IRN)
Mick McKeon (IRL)	PTS
Martin Hansen (DEN)
Aimé-Joseph Escudie (FRA)	PTS
Moustafa Fahim (EGY)
Jan Schubart (NED)	PTS
Johnny Wright (GBR)
Héctor García (ARG)	RSC-2

Quarter-finals
Dogomar Martínez (URU)
Ivano Fontana (ITA)	PTS
Auguste Cavignac (BEL)
László Papp (HUN)	KO-1
Mick McKeon (IRL)	PTS
Aimé-Joseph Escudie (FRA)
Jan Schubart (NED)
Johnny Wright (GBR)	PTS

Semi-finals
Ivano Fontana (ITA)
László Papp (HUN)	PTS
Mick McKeon (IRL)
Johnny Wright (GBR)	PTS

Final
László Papp (HUN)	PTS
Johnny Wright (GBR)
Third place
Ivano Fontana (ITA)	WO
Mick McKeon (IRL)
