= Nino Benvenuti =

Italian boxer and actor (1938–2025)

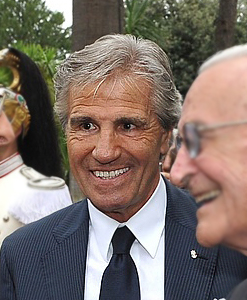
- Benvenuti in 2010

Personal information
- Nickname: Nino
- Nationality: Italian
- Born: Giovanni Benvenuti; 26 April 1938 Isola d'Istria, Italy
- Died: 20 May 2025 (aged 87) Rome, Italy
- Height: 1.77 m (5 ft 10 in)
- Weight: 79.5 kg (175 lb)

Boxing career
- Weight class: Light middleweight; Middleweight; Light heavyweight
- Stance: Orthodox

Boxing record
- Total fights: 90
- Wins: 82
- Win by KO: 35
- Losses: 7
- Draws: 1
Medal record
Men's amateur boxing
Representing Italy
Olympics
Gold medal – first place	1960 Rome	Welterweight
European Championships
Gold medal – first place	1957 Prague	Light middleweight
Gold medal – first place	1959 Lucerne	Light middleweight

Giovanni "Nino" Benvenuti (26 April 1938 – 20 May 2025) was an Italian professional boxer and actor. He held world titles in two weight classes, having held the undisputed super-welterweight championship from June 1965 to June 1966 and the undisputed middleweight championship twice, from April to September 1967, and from March 1968 to November 1970. As an amateur welterweight boxer he won the Italian title in 1956–60, the European title in 1957 and 1959, and an Olympic gold medal in 1960, receiving the Val Barker trophy for boxing style. In 1961, having an amateur record of 120–0, he turned professional and won world titles in the light-middleweight division and twice in the middleweight division. Near the end of his boxing career he appeared in two Italian films, Sundance and the Kid (1969) and then in Mark Shoots First (1975).

Inducted into the International Boxing Hall of Fame in 1992, Benvenuti is ranked No. 32 in BoxRec's ranking of the greatest pound for pound boxers of all time. In 1968, he was voted Fighter of the Year by The Ring magazine. In 2011, The Ring magazine ranked him as seventh on their list of the "10 best middleweight title holders of the last 50 years."

== Professional boxing career ==
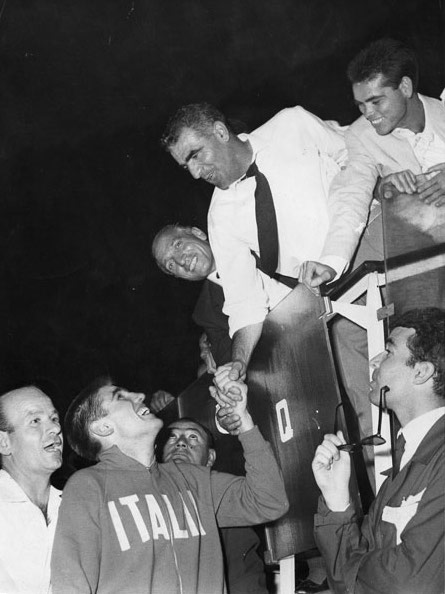
Benvenuti talks to his father Fernando at the 1960 Olympics

On 20 January 1961, Benvenuti made his professional boxing debut, beating Ben Ali Allala by decision in six rounds. He then won 29 fights in a row before challenging for the Italian middleweight title, on 1 March 1963, in Rome against Tommaso Truppi. His winning streak extended to 30 when he knocked out Truppi in round eleven. His winning streak reached 46 wins in a row when he met former world junior middleweight champion Denny Moyer on 18 September 1964, beating Moyer on points in ten rounds.

After reaching 55 wins in a row, including a five-round knockout of Truppi in a rematch, he met world jr. middleweight champion Sandro Mazzinghi in Milan, on 18 June 1965. This was a fight the Italian public clamoured for: both men were Italian, both men claimed to be the best in their division, and they had expressed the desire to fight each other. Benvenuti became the world junior middleweight champion with a sixth-round knockout win. It was common, in that era, for world champions to fight for regional belts after winning the world title, so on 15 October 1965, he added the European belt at the middleweight division, with a sixth-round knockout of Luis Folledo.

A rematch with Mazzinghi took place on 17 December 1965, and Benvenuti retained the world junior middleweight crown after winning a fifteen-round decision. After three non-title wins, including a twelve-round decision over Don Fullmer and a fourteen-round knockout in West Germany of Jupp Elze (Benvenuti's first professional fight abroad), he travelled to South Korea, where he lost his world junior middleweight title to Ki-Soo Kim, who won by decision in fifteen rounds on 25 June 1966, breaking Benvenuti's record of 65 consecutive wins. Frustrated by what he perceived as an unjust decision to favour the local boxer, Benvenuti decided to drop the junior middleweight and concentrate on the middleweight division instead.

Benvenuti beat Emile Griffith by decision in fifteen rounds at New York City's Madison Square Garden on 17 April 1967, in what was the beginning of their trilogy of fights, to win the world middleweight title. On a rematch at Shea Stadium on 29 September 1967, he lost by a decision in fifteen rounds.

On 4 March 1968, Benvenuti and Griffith completed their trilogy, once again at Madison Square Garden, with Benvenuti knocking Griffith down in round nine and winning a fifteen-round decision to regain the world middleweight title. On 14 December 1968, in San Remo, he and Fullmer met once again, and Benvenuti retained the world middleweight title with a fifteen-round decision. On 26 May 1969, Benvenuti lost a ten-round decision to former world light heavyweight champion Dick Tiger in a light heavyweight, non-title match. Benvenuti broke his right hand while landing a head punch in the first round, but chose to continue fighting "like a cripple" rather than quit.

The most curious defence of Benvenuti's active reign, took place on 4 October 1969, when he retained the world middleweight title with a seven-round disqualification win over American Fraser Scott at the Stadio S. Paolo in Naples. From the first round, Scott was warned repeatedly, and with increasing intensity from the referee, about attempted butting. Scott, a young fighter unschooled in the European insistence on what his trainer referred to as "that...Olympic stand-up style", knowing only the battle plan he went in with and speaking no Italian, did not understand the warnings at first, then was unable to alter his approach; to the American, he was merely "ducking" Benvenuti's shots. The bout was foul-filled even without this added controversy; Scott would later accuse Benvenuti of having tried to thumb him, and during the sixth round, the fighters' legs became entangled as they wrestled, causing both to crash to the canvas. Round seven saw the stoppage, the referee asserting "attempted butting", Fraser Scott and corner forever insisting he had "ducked".

On 22 November 1969, Benvenuti beat former world welterweight champion Luis Rodriguez by knockout in 11 rounds and once again retained his world middleweight title.

On 13 March 1970, in a non-title bout, Benvenuti was knocked out in the eighth round by unknown American Tom Bethea in Australia. The upset defeat caused Bethea to earn a world title shot at Benvenuti's title. Benvenuti avenged the defeat when the two met again in Umag with an eighth-round knockout.

On 7 November 1970, Benvenuti lost his title in Rome after being knocked out in round twelve by rising star Carlos Monzón.

In 1971, after losing a ten-round decision to José Chirino, a fighter he had picked due to his fighting style's similarities with Monzón, Benvenuti got a rematch with Monzón for the world middleweight title in Monte Carlo on 8 May 1971. Monzón won again in round three when Benvenuti's corner threw in the towel. Realizing that he no longer had the stamina to compete with champions of a new generation like Monzón, Benvenuti announced his retirement.

Benvenuti had a record of 82 wins, 7 losses and 1 draw (tie) in 90 professional boxing bouts, with 35 wins by knockout. In 1992, he was inducted into the International Boxing Hall of Fame.

== Post-boxing ==
After retiring from boxing Benvenuti became a successful businessman, TV pundit, and city counsellor for sport in Trieste. He opened a high-class restaurant and maintained a strong friendship with his former rivals Monzón and Griffith. In 1980, Benvenuti asked Griffith to be the godfather of one of his sons and later helped him financially when Griffith was in trouble. Monzón was a guest at Benvenuti's television show several times, and, when he was accused of murdering his wife in 1988, Benvenuti became one of his most loyal supporters, visiting him in jail in Argentina. Benvenuti was a pallbearer at Monzón's funeral in 1995.

== Retirement, personal life and death ==
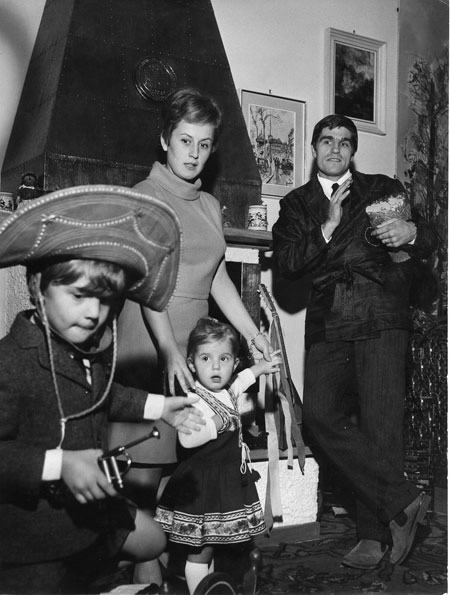
Benvenuti with wife Giuliana Fonzari and two sons in the 1960s

Benvenuti was born in Isola d'Istria, at that time in Italy (now in Slovenia). After the war, his family fled to Italy due to the consequences of the war treaty and the hostilities created by the Yugoslav government.

In 1961, Benvenuti married Giuliana Fonzari; they had four sons and adopted a Tunisian girl. They later divorced, and Benvenuti married Nadia Bertorello, with whom he had one daughter.

Benvenuti died on 20 May 2025, at the age of 87.

== Professional boxing record ==
90 fights	82 wins	7 losses
By knockout	35	3
By decision	42	4
By disqualification	5	0
Draws	1	

No.	Result	Record	Opponent	Type	Round, time	Date	Location	Notes
90	Loss	82–7–1	Carlos Monzón	TKO	3 (15), 1:05	8 May 1971	Stade Louis II, Fontvieille, Monte Carlo, Monaco	For WBA, WBC, and The Ring middleweight titles
89	Loss	82–6–1	José Chirino	MD	10	17 Mar 1971	Bologna, Emilia-Romagna, Italy	
88	Loss	82–5–1	Carlos Monzón	TKO	12 (15), 1:57	7 Nov 1970	Palazzetto dello Sport, Rome, Lazio, Italy	Lost WBA, WBC, and The Ring middleweight titles
87	Win	82–4–1	Doyle Baird	TKO	10 (10), 2:03	12 Sep 1970	Stadio della Vittoria, Bari, Apulia, Italy	
86	Win	81–4–1	Tom Bethea	KO	8 (15), 2:43	23 May 1970	Sports Stadium Arena, Umag, Yugoslavia	Retained WBA, WBC, and The Ring middleweight titles
85	Loss	80–4–1	Tom Bethea	TKO	8 (10)	13 Mar 1970	Olympic Velodrome, Melbourne, Victoria, Australia	
84	Win	80–3–1	Luis Manuel Rodríguez	KO	11 (15), 1:08	22 Nov 1969	Palazzetto dello Sport, Rome, Lazio, Italy	Retained WBA, WBC, and The Ring middleweight titles
83	Win	79–3–1	Fraser Scott	DQ	7 (15), 1:40	4 Oct 1969	Stadio San Paolo, Naples, Campania, Italy	Retained WBA, WBC, and The Ring middleweight titles
82	Loss	78–3–1	Dick Tiger	UD	10	26 May 1969	Madison Square Garden, New York City, New York, U.S.	
81	Win	78–2–1	Don Fullmer	UD	15	14 Dec 1968	Teatro Ariston, Sanremo, Liguria, Italy	Retained WBA, WBC, and The Ring middleweight titles
80	Draw	77–2–1	Doyle Baird	PTS	10	14 Oct 1968	Rubber Bowl, Akron, Ohio, U.S.	
79	Win	77–2	Art Hernandez	UD	10	17 Sep 1968	Maple Leaf Gardens, Toronto, Ontario, Canada	
78	Win	76–2	Jimmy Ramos	RTD	4 (10), 0:30	5 Jul 1968	Turin, Piedmont, Italy	
77	Win	75–2	Yoshiaki Akasaka	KO	2 (10)	7 Jun 1968	Palazzetto dello Sport, Rome, Lazio, Italy	
76	Win	74–2	Emile Griffith	UD	15	4 Mar 1968	Madison Square Garden, New York City, New York, U.S.	Won WBA, WBC, and The Ring middleweight titles
75	Win	73–2	Charley Austin	PTS	10	19 Jan 1968	Palazzetto dello Sport, Rome, Lazio, Italy	
74	Loss	72–2	Emile Griffith	MD	15	29 Sep 1967	Shea Stadium, New York City, New York, U.S.	Lost WBA, WBC, and The Ring middleweight titles
73	Win	72–1	Emile Griffith	UD	15	17 Apr 1967	Madison Square Garden, New York City, New York, U.S.	Won WBA, WBC, and The Ring middleweight titles
72	Win	71–1	Milo Calhoun	PTS	10	3 Mar 1967	Palazzetto dello Sport, Rome, Lazio, Italy	
71	Win	70–1	Manfred Graus	KO	2 (10), 2:40	19 Jan 1967	Palazzetto dello Sport, Rome, Lazio, Italy	
70	Win	69–1	Renato Moraes	KO	9 (10)	23 Dec 1966	Rome, Lazio, Italy	
69	Win	68–1	Ferd Hernandez	PTS	10	2 Dec 1966	Palazzetto dello Sport, Rome, Lazio, Italy	
68	Win	67–1	Pascal Di Benedetto	RTD	11 (15)	21 Oct 1966	Palazzetto dello Sport, Rome, Lazio, Italy	Retained European middleweight title
67	Win	66–1	Harry Scott	PTS	10	23 Sep 1966	Palazzetto dello Sport, Rome, Lazio, Italy	
66	Loss	65–1	Kim Ki-Soo	SD	15	25 Jun 1966	Jangchung Gymnasium, Seoul, South Korea	Lost WBA and WBC junior middleweight titles
65	Win	65–0	Jupp Elze	TKO	14 (15), 1:27	14 May 1966	Deutschlandhalle, West Berlin, West Germany	Retained European middleweight title
64	Win	64–0	Clarence James	PTS	10	11 Mar 1966	Turin, Piedmont, Italy	
63	Win	63–0	Don Fullmer	UD	12	4 Feb 1966	Palazzetto dello Sport, Rome, Lazio, Italy	
62	Win	62–0	Sandro Mazzinghi	UD	15	17 Dec 1965	Palazzetto dello Sport, Rome, Lazio, Italy	Retained WBA and WBC junior middleweight titles
61	Win	61–0	James Shelton	PTS	10	15 Nov 1965	Bologna, Emilia-Romagna, Italy	
60	Win	60–0	Johnny Torres	DQ	7 (10)	5 Nov 1965	Turin, Piedmont, Italy	
59	Win	59–0	Luis Folledo	KO	6 (15)	15 Oct 1965	Palazzetto dello Sport, Rome, Lazio, Italy	Won vacant European middleweight title
58	Win	58–0	Daniel Leullier	TKO	7 (10)	16 Aug 1965	Senigallia, Marche, Italy	
57	Win	57–0	Sandro Mazzinghi	KO	6 (15), 2:40	18 Jun 1965	San Siro, Milan, Lombardy, Italy	Won WBA and WBC junior middleweight titles
56	Win	56–0	Milo Calhoun	PTS	10	30 Apr 1965	Genoa, Liguria, Italy	
55	Win	55–0	Rip Randall	PTS	10	2 Apr 1965	Palazzetto dello Sport, Rome, Lazio, Italy	
54	Win	54–0	Dick Knight	KO	6 (10)	19 Mar 1965	Bologna, Emilia-Romagna, Italy	
53	Win	53–0	Mick Leahy	PTS	10	27 Feb 1965	Palazzo dello Sport, Milan, Lombardy, Italy	
52	Win	52–0	Tommaso Truppi	RTD	5 (12)	12 Feb 1965	Bologna, Emilia-Romagna, Italy	Retained Italian middleweight title
51	Win	51–0	Art Hernandez	TKO	3 (10), 2:20	22 Jan 1965	Palazzetto dello Sport, Rome, Lazio, Italy	
50	Win	50–0	Juan Carlos Durán	PTS	10	19 Dec 1964	Palazzo dello Sport, Milan, Lombardy, Italy	
49	Win	49–0	Aristeo Chavarin	KO	4 (10)	27 Nov 1964	Palazzetto dello Sport, Rome, Lazio, Italy	
48	Win	48–0	Abrao De Souza	DQ	7 (10)	9 Oct 1964	Palazzetto dello Sport, Rome, Lazio, Italy	
47	Win	47–0	Denny Moyer	PTS	10	18 Sep 1964	Palazzetto dello Sport, Rome, Lazio, Italy	
46	Win	46–0	Fabio Bettini	PTS	12	30 Jul 1964	Sanremo, Liguria, Italy	Retained Italian middleweight title
45	Win	45–0	Jimmy Beecham	TKO	2 (10)	28 May 1964	Bologna, Emilia-Romagna, Italy	
44	Win	44–0	Sugar Boy Nando	PTS	10	10 Apr 1964	Palazzetto dello Sport, Rome, Lazio, Italy	
43	Win	43–0	Michel Diouf	PTS	10	18 Mar 1964	Bologna, Emilia-Romagna, Italy	
42	Win	42–0	Memo Ayon	KO	5 (10), 0:28	28 Feb 1964	Palazzetto dello Sport, Rome, Lazio, Italy	
41	Win	41–0	Ted Wright	PTS	10	13 Dec 1963	Palazzetto dello Sport, Rome, Lazio, Italy	
40	Win	40–0	Luis Gutierrez	TKO	7 (10)	15 Nov 1963	Palazzetto dello Sport, Rome, Lazio, Italy	
39	Win	39–0	Jackie Cailleau	PTS	10	7 Nov 1963	Prato, Tuscany, Italy	
38	Win	38–0	Gaspar Ortega	PTS	10	18 Oct 1963	Palazzetto dello Sport, Rome, Lazio, Italy	
37	Win	37–0	Víctor Zalazar	TKO	2 (10)	27 Sep 1963	Palazzetto dello Sport, Rome, Lazio, Italy	
36	Win	36–0	Wilhelm Niederau	TKO	6 (10)	16 Sep 1963	Prato, Tuscany, Italy	
35	Win	35–0	Francesco Fiori	TKO	3 (12)	31 Aug 1963	Priverno, Lazio, Italy	Retained Italian middleweight title
34	Win	34–0	Tony Montano	PTS	10	7 Jun 1963	Palazzetto dello Sport, Rome, Lazio, Italy	
33	Win	33–0	Jimmy Beecham	PTS	10	23 May 1963	Stadio Flaminio, Rome, Lazio, Italy	
32	Win	32–0	Jean Ruellet	PTS	10	24 Apr 1963	Palazzetto dello Sport, Alessandria, Piedmont, Italy	
31	Win	31–0	Georges Estatoff	KO	6 (10), 0:33	5 Apr 1963	Palazzo dello Sport, Turin, Piedmont, Italy	
30	Win	30–0	Tommaso Truppi	KO	11 (12)	1 Mar 1963	Rome, Lazio, Italy	Won vacant Italian middleweight title
29	Win	29–0	Giampaolo Melis	KO	2 (10)	26 Dec 1962	Bologna, Emilia-Romagna, Italy	
28	Win	28–0	Isaac Logart	PTS	10	30 Nov 1962	Palazzetto dello Sport, Rome, Lazio, Italy	
27	Win	27–0	Daniel Leullier	PTS	10	18 Oct 1962	Padua, Veneto, Italy	
26	Win	26–0	Diego Infantes	PTS	8	28 Sep 1962	Palazzetto dello Sport, Rome, Lazio, Italy	
25	Win	25–0	Giuseppe Gentiletti	KO	2 (10)	30 Aug 1962	Senigallia, Marche, Italy	
24	Win	24–0	Mahmout le Noir	PTS	8	2 Aug 1962	Lignano, Emilia-Romagna, Italy	
23	Win	23–0	Gino Rossi	PTS	10	12 Jul 1962	Trieste, Friuli-Venezia Giulia, Italy	
22	Win	22–0	Heinz Freytag	PTS	8	22 Jun 1962	Palazzetto dello Sport, Rome, Lazio, Italy	
21	Win	21–0	Jean Ruellet	PTS	8	2 Jun 1962	Stadio Amsicora, Cagliari, Sardinia, Italy	
20	Win	20–0	Hector Constance	PTS	10	1 May 1962	Trieste, Friuli-Venezia Giulia, Italy	
19	Win	19–0	Jim Hegerle	KO	4 (11)	13 Apr 1962	Palazzetto dello Sport, Rome, Lazio, Italy	
18	Win	18–0	Gianni Lommi	KO	5 (10)	17 Mar 1962	Milan, Lombardy, Italy	
17	Win	17–0	Manfred Haas	PTS	8	8 Mar 1962	Turin, Piedmont, Italy	
16	Win	16–0	José Riquelme	PTS	8	19 Feb 1962	Palazzetto dello Sport, Bologna, Emilia-Romagna, Italy	
15	Win	15–0	George Aldridge	KO	6 (10)	19 Jan 1962	Palazzetto dello Sport, Rome, Lazio, Italy	
14	Win	14–0	Giuseppe Catalano	PTS	8	20 Dec 1961	Palazzetto dello Sport, Rome, Lazio, Italy	
13	Win	13–0	Jesse Jones	DQ	6 (8)	9 Nov 1961	Palazzetto dello Sport, Rome, Lazio, Italy	
12	Win	12–0	Angelo Brisci	KO	1 (8)	1 Nov 1961	Trieste, Friuli-Venezia Giulia, Italy	
11	Win	11–0	Retmia Mahrez	TKO	3 (8)	2 Oct 1961	Bologna, Emilia-Romagna, Italy	
10	Win	10–0	Marc Desforneaux	PTS	6	17 Jun 1961	Trieste, Friuli-Venezia Giulia, Italy	
9	Win	9–0	Henri Cabelduc	PTS	6	7 Jun 1961	Bologna, Emilia-Romagna, Italy	
8	Win	8–0	Michel Francois	KO	4 (8)	16 May 1961	Turin, Piedmont, Italy	
7	Win	7–0	Daniel Brunet	DQ	3 (8)	3 May 1961	Naples, Campania, Italy	
6	Win	6–0	Pierre Mondino	PTS	6	21 Apr 1961	Florence, Tuscany, Italy	
5	Win	5–0	Nic Maric	PTS	6	7 Apr 1961	PalaLido, Milan, Lombardy, Italy	
4	Win	4–0	Sahib Mosri	KO	3 (6)	14 Mar 1961	Bologna, Emilia-Romagna, Italy	
3	Win	3–0	Ben Ali Allala	KO	1 (6)	27 Feb 1961	Naples, Campania, Italy	
2	Win	2–0	Nicola Sammartino	KO	3 (6)	10 Feb 1961	Palazzetto dello Sport, Rome, Lazio, Italy	
1	Win	1–0	Ben Ali Allala	PTS	6	20 Jan 1961	Trieste, Friuli-Venezia Giulia, Italy	

== Titles in boxing ==
=== Major world titles ===
- WBA light middleweight champion (154 lbs)
- WBC light middleweight champion (154 lbs)
- WBA middleweight champion (160 lbs) (2×)
- WBC middleweight champion (160 lbs) (2×)

=== The Ring magazine titles ===
- The Ring middleweight champion (160 lbs) (2×)

=== Regional/International titles ===
- European middleweight champion (160 lbs)
- Italian middleweight champion (160 lbs)

=== Undisputed titles ===
- Undisputed light middleweight champion
- Undisputed middleweight champion (2×)

== Awards ==
On 7 May 2015, in the presence of the President of Italian National Olympic Committee (CONI), Giovanni Malagò, he was inaugurated in the Olympic Park of the Foro Italico in Rome, along Viale delle Olimpiadi, the Walk of Fame of Italian sport, consisting of 100 tiles that chronologically report names of the most representative athletes in the history of Italian sport. On each tile is the name of the sportsman, the sport in which he distinguished himself and the symbol of CONI. One of the tiles is dedicated to Nino Benvenuti.

== See also ==
- Legends of Italian sport - Walk of Fame
- List of world light-middleweight boxing champions
- List of world middleweight boxing champions

== Bibliography ==
- I, Benvenuti. Carroccio. 1967.
- Nino Benvenuti (2001). Il mondo in pugno. Sperling & Kupfer. ISBN 978-88-200-3074-2.

Sporting positions
Regional boxing titles
Vacant Title last held by László Papp	EBU middleweight champion 15 October 1965 – 17 April 1967; Won world title	Vacant Title next held by Juan Carlo Duran
World boxing titles
Preceded by Alessandro Mazzinghi	WBA super-welterweight champion 18 June 1965 – 25 June 1966	Succeeded by Kim Ki-soo
Preceded by Alessandro Mazzinghi	WBC super-welterweight champion 18 June 1965 – 25 June 1966	Succeeded by Kim Ki-soo
Preceded by Alessandro Mazzinghi	Undisputed super-welterweight champion 18 June 1965 – 25 June 1966	Succeeded by Kim Ki-soo
Preceded by Emile Griffith	WBA middleweight champion 17 April 1967 – 29 September 1967	Succeeded by Emile Griffith
Preceded by Emile Griffith	WBC middleweight champion 17 April 1967 – 29 September 1967	Succeeded by Emile Griffith
Preceded by Emile Griffith	The Ring middleweight champion 17 April 1967 – 29 September 1967	Succeeded by Emile Griffith
Preceded by Emile Griffith	Undisputed middleweight champion 17 April 1967 – 29 September 1967	Succeeded by Emile Griffith
Preceded by Emile Griffith	WBA middleweight champion 4 March 1968 – 7 November 1970	Succeeded by Carlos Monzón
Preceded by Emile Griffith	WBC middleweight champion 4 March 1968 – 7 November 1970	Succeeded by Carlos Monzón
Preceded by Emile Griffith	The Ring middleweight champion 4 March 1968 – 7 November 1970	Succeeded by Carlos Monzón
Preceded by Emile Griffith	Undisputed middleweight champion 4 March 1968 – 7 November 1970	Succeeded by Carlos Monzón
Middleweight status
Preceded by Terry Downes	Oldest living world champion 6 October 2017 – 20 May 2025	Succeeded by Roberto Durán
