= Mazzinghi =

Mazzinghi is an Italian surname that may refer to

- Alessandro Mazzinghi (1938–2020), Italian boxer
- Angelo Agostini Mazzinghi (1385–1438), Italian Roman Catholic priest
- Guido Mazzinghi (1932–1996), Italian Olympic boxer, brother of Alessandro
- Joseph Mazzinghi (1765–1844), British composer
