= Curvis =

Curvis is a surname. Notable people with the surname include:

- Brian Curvis (1937–2012), Welsh boxer
- Cliff Curvis (1927–2009), Welsh boxer
