= Christian Christensen (boxer) =

Danish boxer (1926–2005)

Christian Kristensen
Personal information
- Nationality: Danish
- Born: 21 May 1926 Kundby, Denmark
- Died: 28 January 2005 (aged 78)

Sport
- Sport: Boxing

There are several people with this name, for others, see Christian Christensen (disambiguation).

Christian Kjeld Kristensen known as Christian "Gentleman Chris" Christensen, (21 May 1926 – 28 January 2005), was a Danish professional middleweight boxer. His heyday was in the late 1950s and early 1960s, when he won the European middleweight title. Professionally, he had a 20.25% knock-out rate, winning 56 of his 79 professional fights. He was born in Kundby, Holbæk, Zealand, Denmark.

== Amateur career ==
Christensen boxed as a welterweight amateur for AK Falcon, and won the Junior Division of the Danish Amateur Boxing Union (Dansk Amatør Bokse-Union) championship (DM) in 1944. In 1946, he won the silver medal at the DM in the Senior Division, when he lost the final bout to Svend Møller. Then he won the Danish championship in the welterweight in 1947 and 1948 .

He participated as a welterweight in the European Cup in 1947, but lost his second match to Charles Humez of France. In 1948, Christensen represented Denmark at the Olympic Games in London. His first and only match was 7 August 1948 at the Empress Hall, Earls Court Exhibition Centre, Kensington. He lost that match to Englishman Max B. Shacklady, and thus his chance at a medal. Other than those, Christensen participated in ten amateur boxing matches, and won nine of them. His last amateur fight was a test match against Ulf Olsen of Norway; Christensen won, but was later stripped of his victory because he had signed his first written professional contract just before the fight.

== 1948 Olympic results ==
Below is the record of Christian Christensen, a Danish welterweight boxer who competed at the 1948 London Olympics:

- Round of 32: Lost to Max Shacklady (Great Britain) by a third-round knockout

== Professional career ==
Christensen debuted as a professional boxer on 11 February 1949 in Copenhagen, matched against Said Boina. He came away with a victory on points after six rounds. In 1950 he won the Danish professional national championship in the welterweight division on 24 November, in a match against Martin Hansen. In 1952, he won the Danish championship in the middleweight division in a rematch against Martin Hansen. On 24 February 1954, in a match against the Swede Olle Bengtsson in Gothenburg for the Scandinavian middleweight Championship, Christensen was knocked out in the seventh round. In 1954 and 1955 he toured in the United States, where he fought eight matches, winning only three, including defeating former World title challenger Billy Graham, but losing the other five.

But by 1961, Christensen was back in the game, challenging Duilio Loi of Italy for the European Championship in the welterweight division. Duilo Loi won on points over Christensen after 15 rounds. Undeterred, Christensen met Scotsman John "Cowboy" McCormack in K.B. Hallen in Copenhagen on 8 February 1962 for the European middleweight championship. Christensen was knocked down in the fourth round, but began to get up again. Before he could get to his feet and while the referee was still counting, McCormack struck Christensen down again, causing a general uproar, both inside and outside the ring. After the crowd quieted, Christensen was declared the winner on a disqualification. Christensen thus became the third Danish holder of the European championship, Knud Larsen and Jørgen Johansen having come before. Christensen lost the European middleweight championship in his next bout against the Hungarian 3-time Olympic gold medalist László Papp, who won on a technical knockout in the seventh round in Vienna on 16 May 1962.

On 3 February 1963, Christensen was matched against the American Emile Griffith at the Forum in Copenhagen. Griffith was at that time welterweight world champion and according to the Australian Boxing Federation was the world champion in the light-middleweight division as well. Although the match was announced as a world title fight in the light-middleweight division, only Australia recognized it as such, as Griffith was never generally recognized by any major boxing sanctioning organizations as a world Light-Middleweight champion. Griffith was clearly superior, and sent Christensen to the floor in the third round. Christensen took two more rounds before his cornermen throwing in the towel in round five.

During July 1964, at the Forum in Copenhagen, Christensen had a rematch against László Papp for the European Light-Middleweight Championship, but he was knocked out in the fourth round. In his last match as a professional at the age of 38, Christensen tried once again to regain a European Championship, this time as a Light-Middleweight, but he lost to Italy's Bruno Visintin. The fight was stopped after eleven rounds with Visintin gaining the victory on points.

== Professional boxing record ==
79 fights	56 wins	19 losses
By knockout	16	8
By decision	36	11
By disqualification	4	0
Draws	4	

No.	Result	Record	Opponent	Type	Round, time	Date	Location	Notes
79	Loss	56–19–4	Bruno Visintin	KO	11 (15)	12 Mar 1965	K.B. Hallen, Copenhagen, Denmark	For European light-middleweight title
78	Win	56–18–4	Ray Philippe	PTS	10	4 Feb 1965	K.B. Hallen, Copenhagen, Denmark	
77	Loss	55–18–4	Milo Sarens	TKO	3 (10)	11 Dec 1964	Nidarohallen, Trondheim, Norway	
76	Win	55–17–4	Klaus Klein	PTS	10	1 Oct 1964	K.B. Hallen, Copenhagen, Denmark	
75	Loss	54–17–4	László Papp	KO	4 (15)	2 Jul 1964	Forum, Copenhagen, Denmark	For European middleweight title
74	Win	54–16–4	Fortunato Manca	PTS	10	27 Feb 1964	K.B. Hallen, Copenhagen, Denmark	
73	Win	53–16–4	Mauri Bäckman	PTS	10	1 Jan 1964	K.B. Hallen, Copenhagen, Denmark	
72	Draw	52–16–4	Tony Smith	PTS	10	22 Nov 1963	K.B. Hallen, Copenhagen, Denmark	
71	Win	52–16–3	Stefan Redl	PTS	10	4 Oct 1963	K.B. Hallen, Copenhagen, Denmark	
70	Loss	51–16–3	Emile Griffith	TKO	9 (15)	3 Feb 1963	Forum, Copenhagen, Denmark	For World light-middleweight title; Recognized by the Austrian Boxing Board of Control
69	Win	51–15–3	Wally Swift	PTS	10	9 Nov 1962	K.B. Hallen, Copenhagen, Denmark	
68	Win	50–15–3	Leopold Potesil	KO	5 (10)	4 Oct 1962	K.B. Hallen, Copenhagen, Denmark	
67	Loss	49–15–3	László Papp	TKO	7 (15)	16 May 1962	Stadthalle, Vienna, Austria	Lost European middleweight title
66	Win	49–14–3	John McCormack	DQ	4 (15)	8 Feb 1962	K.B. Hallen, Copenhagen, Denmark	Won European middleweight title; McCormack disqualified for hitting Christensen before the referee had ordered "box on"
65	Win	48–14–3	Bob Cofie	KO	7 (10)	1 Jan 1962	K.B. Hallen, Copenhagen, Denmark	
64	Win	47–14–3	George Aldridge	DQ	9 (10)	30 Nov 1961	K.B. Hallen, Copenhagen, Denmark	
63	Win	46–14–3	Harko Kokmeijer	KO	1 (10)	2 Nov 1961	K.B. Halleb, Copenhagen, Denmark	
62	Loss	45–14–3	Duilio Loi	PTS	15	5 Aug 1961	Saint-Vincent, Valle d'Aosta, Italy	For European welterweight title
61	Win	45–13–3	Luigi Furio	PTS	10	28 Feb 1961	K.B. Hallen, Copenhagen, Denmark	
60	Win	44–13–3	Ahmed Sebbane	UD	10	2 Feb 1961	K.B. Hallen, Copenhagen, Denmark	
59	Win	43–13–3	André Davier	PTS	10	26 Dec 1960	K.B. Hallen, Copenhagen, Denmark	
58	Win	42–13–3	André Mauguin	KO	8 (10)	1 Dec 1960	K.B. Hallen, Copenhagen, Denmark	
57	Win	41–13–3	Luis Folledo	PTS	10	3 Nov 1960	K.B. Hallen, Copenhagen, Denmark	
56	Loss	40–13–3	Ahmed Sebbane	PTS	10	6 Oct 1960	K.B. Hallen, Copenhagen, Denmark	
55	Win	40–12–3	Sauveur Chiocca	PTS	12	2 Jun 1960	K.B. Hallen, Copenhagen, Denmark	
54	Win	39–12–3	Hector Constance	KO	9 (10)	7 Feb 1960	Forum, Copenhagen, Denmark	
53	Win	38–12–3	Helmut Mistol	PTS	10	12 Nov 1959	K.B. Hallen, Copenhagen, Denmark	
52	Win	37–12–3	Emilio Marconi	TKO	9 (10)	1 Oct 1959	K.B. Hallen, Copenhagen, Denmark	
51	Loss	36–12–3	Fortunato Manca	PTS	10	14 Jul 1959	Palazzetto Dello Sport, Cagliari, Italy	
50	Win	36–11–3	Gerd Müller	PTS	10	12 Apr 1959	Aalborghallen, Aalborg, Denmark	
49	Win	35–11–3	Jack Subero	KO	5 (10)	5 Mar 1959	K.B. Hallen, Copenhagen, Denmark	
48	Win	34–11–3	Jacques Herbillon	PTS	10	5 Feb 1959	K.B. Hallen, Copenhagen, Denmark	
47	Win	33–11–3	Theo Baars	PTS	10	4 Jan 1959	Aalborghallen, Aalborg, Denmark	
46	Win	32–11–3	Gaston Mathieu	PTS	10	13 Nov 1958	K.B. Hallen, Copenhagen, Denmark	
45	Loss	31–11–3	Ted Wright	PTS	10	6 Oct 1958	Palazzetto dello Sport, Rome, Italy	
44	Win	31–10–3	Ahmed ben Hamida	PTS	10	11 Sep 1958	K.B. Hallen, Copenhagen, Denmark	
43	Win	30–10–3	Idrissa Dione	PTS	10	20 Mar 1958	K.B. Hallen, Copenhagen, Denmark	
42	Win	29–10–3	Michel François	PTS	8	31 Jan 1958	Forum, Copenhagen, Denmark	
41	Draw	28–10–3	Toon Schuurmans	PTS	6	29 Nov 1957	Nordstrandhallen, Oslo, Norway	
40	Win	28–10–2	Peter King	PTS	8	7 Nov 1957	K.B. Hallen, Copenhagen, Denmark	
39	Loss	27–10–2	Tony DiBiase	MD	10	28 Jan 1957	St. Nicholas Arena, New York City, New York, U.S.	
38	Loss	27–9–2	Olle Bengtsson	TKO	7 (10)	24 Feb 1956	Masshallen, Gothenburg, Sweden	For inaugural Scandinavian middleweight title
37	Loss	27–8–2	Vince Martinez	UD	10	23 Nov 1955	Arena, St. Louis, Missouri, U.S.	
36	Loss	27–7–2	Tiger Jones	UD	10	23 Sep 1955	Arena, Cleveland, Ohio, U.S.	
35	Win	27–6–2	Gene Poirier	TKO	6 (10), 3:00	29 Aug 1955	St. Nicholas Arena, New York City, New York, U.S.	
34	Loss	26–6–2	Danny Giovanelli	UD	10	11 Apr 1955	Eastern Park Arena, New York City, New York, U.S.	
33	Loss	26–5–2	Tony DeMarco	TKO	6 (10), 2:10	25 Sep 1954	Arena, Boston, Massachusetts, U.S.	
32	Win	26–4–2	Johnny Lombardo	UD	10	30 Aug 1954	Eastern Parkway Arena, New York City, New York, U.S.	
31	Win	25–4–2	Billy Graham	SD	10	19 Jul 1954	Eastern Parkway Arena, New York City, New York, U.S.	
30	Loss	24–4–2	Billy Lauderdale	MD	10	22 May 1954	Dinner Key Auditorium, Miami, Florida, U.S.	
29	Win	24–3–2	Cerra Bachir Cheraka	PTS	10	19 Mar 1954	K.B. Hallen, Copenhagen, Denmark	
28	Win	23–3–2	Jean Ruellet	PTS	10	8 Jan 1954	K.B. Hallen, Copenhagen, Denmark	
27	Win	22–3–2	Rafael da Silva	PTS	12	1 Oct 1953	K.B. Hallen, Copenhagen, Denmark	
26	Win	21–3–2	Emmanuel Clavel	KO	5 (10)	3 Sep 1953	K B. Hallen, Copenhagen, Denmark	
25	Loss	20–3–2	Gustav Scholz	TKO	10 (10)	1 Mar 1953	Austellungshalle, Berlin, West Germany	
24	Win	20–2–2	Leo Starosch	DQ	9 (10)	16 Jan 9153	K.B. Hallen, Copenhagen, Denmark	
23	Win	19–2–2	Frits van Kempen	KO	5 (10)	13 Nov 1952	K.B. Hallen, Copenhagen, Denmark	
22	Loss	18–2–2	Jimmy King	PTS	10	17 Oct 1952	K.B. Hallen, Copenhagen, Denmark	
21	Draw	18–1–2	Gustav Scholz	PTS	10	18 Sep 1952	K.B. Hallen, Copenhagen, Denmark	
20	Win	18–1–1	Roger Baour	PTS	10	18 Aug 1952	Idrætsparken, Copenhagen, Denmark	
19	Win	17–1–1	Kid Dussart	PTS	10	20 Mar 1950	K.B. Hallen, Copenhagen, Denmark	
18	Win	16–1–1	Martin Hansen	PTS	10	8 Feb 1952	K.B. Hallen, Copenhagen, Denmark	Won inaugural Danish middleweight title
17	Win	15–1–1	Ernie Vickers	KO	5 (8)	17 Jan 1952	K.B. Hallen, Copenhagen, Denmark	
16	Win	14–1–1	Jackie Braddock	DQ	5 (8)	11 Dec 1951	Royal Albert Hall, London, England	Braddock disqualified for not trying
15	Draw	13–1–1	Carlo Mola	PTS	10	5 Oct 1951	K.B. Hallen, Copenhagen, Denmark	
14	Win	13–1	Bruno Marostegan	PTS	10	16 Mar 1951	K.B. Hallen, Copenhagen, Denmark	
13	Win	12–1	Milo Passchier	KO	5 (8)	16 Feb 1951	K.B. Hallen, Copenhagen, Denmark	
12	Win	11–1	Henri Hecquard	KO	5 (8)	19 Jan 1951	K.B. Hallen, Copenhagen, Denmark	
11	Win	10–1	Martin Hansen	UD	8	24 Nov 1950	K.B. Hallen, Copenhagen, Denmark	Won vacant Danish welterweight title
10	Win	9–1	Émile Chochon	KO	5 (8)	6 Oct 1950	K.B. Hallen, Copenhagen, Denmark	
9	Win	8–1	Valère Benedetto	PTS	8	31 Mar 1950	K.B. Hallen, Copenhagen, Denmark	
8	Win	7–1	Remy Leys	KO	7 (8)	17 Feb 1950	K.B. Hallen, Copenhagen, Denmark	
7	Win	6–1	Maurice Ouezman	PTS	8	20 Jan 1950	K.B. Hallen, Copenhagen, Denmark	
6	Loss	5–1	Yrjö Piitulainen	PTS	8	2 Dec 1949	K.B. Hallen, Copenhagen, Denmark	
5	Win	5–0	Bernard Hyvon	PTS	8	4 Nov 1949	K.B. Hallen, Copenhagen, Denmark	
4	Win	4–0	Areski Boina II	PTS	8	7 Oct 1949	K.B. Hallen, Copenhagen, Denmark	
3	Win	3–0	Aime Lombard	PTS	8	8 Apr 1949	K.B. Hallen, Copenhagen, Denmark	
2	Win	2–0	Roger Djabali	KO	5 (6)	4 Mar 1949	K.B. Hallen, Copenhagen, Denmark	
1	Win	1–0	Areski Boina II	PTS	6	11 Feb 1949	K.B. Hallen, Copenhagen, Denmark	

== Retirement ==
Christensen published his autobiography, Gentleman Chris, in 1964.

Christensen trained Danish and Norwegian boxers in Oslo and Copenhagen in the 1970s.
