= 1947 European Amateur Boxing Championships =

Boxing competitions

- Host city: Dublin
- Country: Ireland
- Dates: 2–17 May

The 1947 European Amateur Boxing Championships were held in the National Stadium, Dublin, Ireland from 2 to 17 May. It was the seventh edition of the bi-annual competition was organised by the European governing body for amateur boxing, EABA and the second consecutive European Championship held in Ireland with the other championship being held before the break during World War II in the 1939 Games.

== Medal winners ==
Event	Gold	Silver	Bronze	
Flyweight (– 51 kilograms)	Luis Martinez Zapata; Spain	James Clinton; Scotland	František Majdloch; Czechoslovakia	József Bednai; Hungary
Bantamweight (– 54 kilograms)	Laszlo Bogacs; Hungary	Bertil Ahlin; Sweden	Peter Sanderson; England	Jim Dwyer; Scotland
Featherweight (– 58 kilograms)	Kurt Kreuger; Sweden	(Republic of Ireland) Peter Maguire; Ireland	Jules van Dyk; Belgium	Lajos Fehér; Hungary
Lightweight (– 62 kilograms)	Joseph Vissers; Belgium	Roger Baour; France	Svend Wad; Denmark	Willie Frith; Scotland
Welterweight (– 67 kilograms)	John Ryan; England	Charles Humez; France	Giuseppe Facchi; Italy	(Republic of Ireland) Eddie Cantwell; Ireland
Middleweight (– 73 kilograms)	Aimé-Joseph Escudie; France	Wally Thom; England	Július Torma; Czechoslovakia	Jan Schubart; Netherlands
Light Heavyweight (– 80 kilograms)	Hennie Quentemeijer; Netherlands	Léon Nowiaz; France	Vital L'Hoste; Belgium	Ken Wyatt; England
Heavyweight (+ 80 kilograms)	(Republic of Ireland) Gerry Ó Colmáin; Ireland	George Scriven; England	Giulio Bastiani; Italy	Bedřich Lívanský; Czechoslovakia

== Medal table ==
Rank	Nation	Gold	Silver	Bronze	Total
1	France (FRA)	1	3	0	4
2	England (ENG)	1	2	1	4
3	Ireland (IRL)	1	1	0	2
3	Sweden (SWE)	1	1	0	2
5	Belgium (BEL)	1	0	2	3
6	Hungary (HUN)	1	0	0	1
6	Netherlands (NED)	1	0	0	1
6	Spain (ESP)	1	0	0	1
9	Scotland (SCO)	0	1	0	1
10	Czechoslovakia (TCH)	0	0	2	2
10	Italy (ITA)	0	0	2	2
12	Denmark (DEN)	0	0	1	1
Totals (12 entries)		8	8	8	24
