= Bo Högberg =

Swedish boxer (1938–2005)

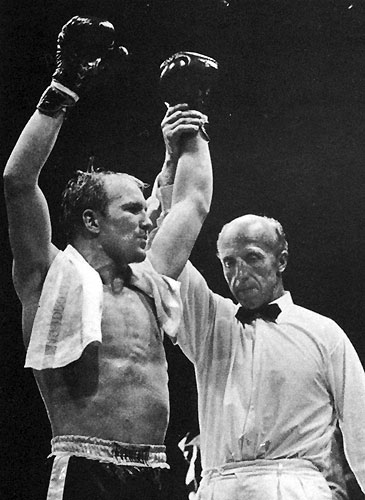
- Bosse Högberg after victory against Werner Mundt at the program in Stockholm on 1 July 1966

Personal information
- Nickname: Bosse
- Nationality: Sweden
- Born: 18 December 1938 Mollösund, Göteborgs and Bohus County, Sweden
- Died: 8 November 2005 (aged 66) Mölndal, Sweden
- Height: 1.80 m (5 ft 11 in)

Boxing career
- Weight class: Light Middleweight

Boxing record
- Total fights: 43
- Wins: 36
- Losses: 6
- Draws: 1

Bo Reine "Bosse" Högberg (18 December 1938 in Mollösund, Bohuslän – 8 November 2005 in Mölndal) was a Swedish boxer. He was the European Champion in Light Middleweight in 1966.

== Early life and career ==
Högberg, who moved with his family to Majorna in Gothenburg at the age of six, became Swedish Champion in Lightweight in 1956 – at just 17 years old. He started his professional career on 15 April 1962, at Johanneshovs Isstadion, where he won against Chris Kok.

On New Year's Day 1966, Högberg became the European Champion in Light Middleweight by defeating the Italian Bruno Visintin, but lost the title to the Frenchman Yoland Lévèque on 11 February of the same year, who broke Högberg's jaw in the first round. Despite the injury, the fight continued for another 14 rounds. Högberg effectively ended his boxing career in 1968, with two loss matches in Mallorca in 1973.

In the ring, Bosse Högberg was known as a strong-willed slugger. In 1966, he lost a tough match to the Italian Sandro Mazzinghi, ranked second in the world. In 1968, he also lost to the Englishman Harold Richardson and decided to retire. Shortly thereafter, he was sentenced to eight months in prison.

During his professional boxing career (1962–1973), Bosse Högberg fought 43 matches, of which he won 35 (25 by knockout), had one draw, and lost six. As an amateur, Högberg won two Swedish Championships and participated in seven international matches.

Högberg suffered from aphasia after a stroke in 1988. He is buried at Fässberg Cemetery.

== Personal life ==
Bosse Högberg was married to Birgit Johansson from 1960, and the couple had a son, Freddie, who died in a car accident at the age of 28. Högberg was married to singer Anita Lindblom from 1966 to 1970. He was married to Liz Öberg from 1976 to 1984 and from 1989 until his death, and with her, he had a daughter, Louise.

== In books and film ==
Kontringen is a documentary novel about Högberg. It was written by Lars Hesslind and published in 1979 by Författarförlaget. A documentary film about Högberg's life was also made: Bosse Högberg – a film about love, illness, and big punches. It was produced in 2000 by Tom Alandh and first aired on SVT2 on 5 October 2000. Bosse Högberg himself also appeared in the film Lyftet from 1978, where he played the drug dealer "Roten" Sandgren in prison.

Bosse Högberg and Anita Lindblom are mentioned in Joakim Thåström's song "Ungefär så här".
