= Evert Johanson =

Norwegian boxer

Personal information
- Nationality: Norwegian
- Born: 19 December 1918; Hokksund, Norway
- Died: 25 May 2000 (aged 81); Akershus, Norway

Sport
- Sport: Boxing

Evert Johanson (19 December 1918 – 25 May 2000) was a Norwegian boxer. He competed in the men's middleweight event at the 1948 Summer Olympics. At the 1948 Summer Olympics, he lost to Martin Hansen of Denmark.
