= Gentleman Chris =

Gentleman Chris may refer to:

- Gentleman Chris Adams (1955-2001), an English wrestler
- Christian Christensen (boxer) (1926-2005), a Danish boxer known as Gentleman Chris
