= Hermann Schneider =

Hermann Schneider may refer to:

- Hermann Schneider (boxer), Swiss boxer
- Hermann Schneider (footballer) (1877–?), Swiss footballer
- Hermann Schneider (philologist) (1886–1961), German philologist
