= Christian Christensen =

Christian Christensen may refer to:

- Christian Christensen Kollerud (1767–1833), Norwegian politician
- Christian Christensen (runner) (1876–1956), Danish track and field athlete
- Christian Christensen (author) (1882–1960), Danish author and anarchist
- Christian Christensen (artist) (1898–1977), Norwegian artist
- Christian A. R. Christensen (1906–1967), Norwegian newspaper editor
- Christian Christensen (editor) (1922–1994), Norwegian newspaper editor
- Christian Christensen (boxer) (1926–2005), Danish middleweight boxer
- Christian Christensen (politician) (1925–1988), Danish politician, Minister for the Environment
- Christian Bommelund Christensen, Danish footballer

== See also ==
- Niels Christian Christensen (1881–1945), Danish sport shooter
- Christen Christensen (disambiguation)
- Chris Christensen (born 1988), Norwegian swimmer
- Chris Christenson (1875–1943), Norwegian-American figure skater
