= Cliff Curvis =

Welsh boxer

Personal information
- Nationality: British
- Born: Cliff Nancurvis; 19 November 1927 Swansea, Wales
- Died: 22 April 2009 (aged 81)
- Weight: Welterweight

Boxing career
- Stance: southpaw

Boxing record
- Total fights: 55
- Wins: 42
- Win by KO: 12
- Losses: 12
- Draws: 1
- No contests: 0

Cliff Curvis (19 November 1927 – 22 April 2009), was a champion welterweight boxer from Swansea, Wales. Curvis fought professionally from the mid-1940s until 1953, winning both the British and Commonwealth titles when he beat Wally Thom in 1952. Curvis was one of four brothers who boxed, most notably British and Commonwealth champion Brian Curvis.

== Career ==
Curvis was born in Swansea in 1927 to Dai Nancurvis. His father had been a bantamweight fighter during his time in the British Forces, and had set up a gym in Swansea in which Curvis trained as a youth. He turned professional in 1944 at the age of 16 weighing in at flyweight. His first fight was a second-round knockout over local fighter Bryn Collins. By the end of 1945 he was fighting in larger venues in England, including a victory over Cliff Anderson at the Queensberry Club in Soho.

Into his late teens, Curvis moved up to featherweight. He lost only one of his first 19 fights, and that came from a disqualifaction against Frankie Williams. As a featherweight he beat both Germain Perez, the French champion and former Northern Area champion, Tom Smith. On 2 December 1946, he faced Al Phillips at the Royal Albert Hall in a title eliminator for the British featherweight title. Phillips, who would the next year become the European champion, knocked Curvis out in the second round. Curvis had been finding it difficult to making the weight at featherweight, and after losing to Phillips he moved up to lightweight. The next year he faced fellow Swansea-based fighter, Ronnie James. James had been unwell in the week before the fight but still met Curvis at the Vetch Field in Swansea on 2 June. Curvis was reported as being 'faster throughout' and came close to knocking his opponent out before James' team threw in the towel in the seventh.

By 1949 Curvis was making headway as a lightweight and on 31 January he was awarded an eliminator bout for the British lightweight title. His opponent was Scottish boxer Harry Hughes and the two faced each other at the Drill Hall in Abergavenny. Curvis lost the match on points. Again Curvis reacted to an eliminator loss by moving up the weight scale to welterweight. Curvis continued his progression and in the summer of 1950 he won his first title eliminator, beating Gwn Williams to set up a shot at the British belt. Before the title challenge he beat ex-Dutch welterweight champion Giel de Roode, followed by a loss to Charles Humez, the recently deposed French welterweight champion. On 13 September 1950 Curvis faced Eddie Thomas for the British welterweight title. Held at St Helen's in Swansea, the fifteen round fight went the distance, Thomas winning by points decision.

In April 1951, Curvis travelled to Ayr in Scotland to challenge Billy Rattray in an eliminator challenge for a British welterweight challenge. Rattray lasted only until the second when Curvis won by knockout. He followed this up with a fight against Wally Thom in July 1952, the final eliminator for the British welterweight belt. The fight was halted in the ninth, when Curvis was eliminated for hitting Thom after a break but before the referee had ordered 'box on'. Thom went on to beat Eddie Thomas, capturing both the British and Commonwealth welterweight titles, and on 24 July 1952 Curvis was given his first shot at a British belt when he was lined up to challenge Thom. Curvis stopped Thom in the ninth via knockout, becoming British and European welterweight champion.

Curvis lost the European belt to South African Gerald Dreyer on 8 December 1952. The match, held in the newly built Rand Stadium in Johannesburg, resulted in Curvis losing his Commonwealth belt. He had Dreyer down in the sixth, but he survived a 'long count' which lasted as long as sixteen seconds; this was followed by Curvis breaking his left hand and without his main attack he was forced to box defensively for the rest of the fight. Curvis lost the bout on points. His final fight was against Frenchman Gilbert Lavoine for the vacant EBU European title. Curvis was disqualified in the tenth and never fought professionally again.

== Bibliography ==
- Stead, Peter; Williams, Gareth, eds. (2008). Wales and its Boxers, The Fighting Tradition. Cardiff: University of Wales Press. ISBN 978-0-7083-1915-4.

== See also ==
- List of British welterweight boxing champions
