= James Oliver =

James Oliver may refer to:

== Politics ==
- James C. Oliver (1895–1986), American politician
- James Harrison Oliver (1857–1928), American admiral and governor of the United States Virgin Islands
- James Michael Oliver (James Michael Yorrick Oliver, born 1940), Lord Mayor of London 2001–2002
- James T. Oliver (1849–1923), American politician
- James V. Oliver, American politician from Maine
- James W. Oliver (1844–1911), New York politician

== Professionals ==
- James Oliver (inventor) (1823–1908), American inventor and industrialist
- James Henry Oliver (1905–1981), American classical scholar and epigrapher
- James Arthur Oliver (1914–1981), American zoologist, herpetologist, and educator
- James Edward Oliver (1829–1895), American mathematician and educator
- James Oliver (physician), American physician

== Others ==
- James Oliver-Pearce (born 1991), English football coach

== See also ==
- Jim Oliver (disambiguation)
- Jimmy Oliver (disambiguation)
- Jamie Oliver (disambiguation)
- Oliver James (disambiguation)
