= Jack Keenan (boxer) =

Canadian boxer

Personal information
- Nationality: Canadian
- Born: 14 September 1929; Montreal, Quebec, Canada
- Died: 21 June 2009 (aged 79); Montreal, Quebec, Canada

Sport
- Sport: Boxing

Jack Keenan (14 September 1929 – 21 June 2009) was a Canadian boxer. He competed in the men's middleweight event at the 1948 Summer Olympics. At the 1948 Summer Olympics, he lost to Mick McKeon of Ireland.
