= Washington Jones =

American boxer (1925–1987)

Personal information
- Born: July 14, 1925 St. Louis, Missouri, U.S.
- Died: November 9, 1987 (aged 62) St. Louis, Missouri, U.S.

Sport
- Sport: Boxing

Washington Jones (July 14, 1925 – November 9, 1987) was an American boxer. He competed in the men's middleweight event at the 1948 Summer Olympics. At the 1948 Summer Olympics, he lost to Auguste Cavignac of Belgium.
