= Peter Waterman =

English boxer

Personal information
- Nationality: British
- Born: 8 December 1934 Stepney, Tower Hamlets, East London, England
- Died: 16 January 1986 (aged 51) Islington, London, England
- Weight: Welterweight

Boxing career

Peter Waterman (8 December 1934 – 16 January 1986) was an English boxer and a British and European welterweight champion.

Waterman was born in Stepney, East London, England, one of nine children of Rose Juliana (née Saunders) and Harry Frank Waterman. His younger brother, Dennis Waterman, became an actor and singer. His father had been an amateur boxer and made all of his sons box.

He began boxing at the age of 11 and had an amateur career winning 121 of his 130 bouts. He won the 1952 Amateur Boxing Association British light-welterweight title, when boxing out of the Caius ABC.

In 1952, he represented the Great Britain at the 1952 Summer Olympics at Helsinki, Finland, in the light-welterweight class.

When Waterman was 18, he became a professional and won the British welterweight title in 1956. In 1957, he beat Emilio Marconi to gain the European welterweight title. In April 1958, after a fight with British lightweight champion, Dave Charnley, he had to be helped to the dressing room. A few months later Waterman underwent brain surgery and never fought again.

He died suddenly in Islington at the age of 51.

Achievements
Preceded by Wally Thom	British Welterweight Champion; 5 June 1956 – 17 December 1956	Succeeded by Tommy Molloy
Preceded by Emilio Marconi	European Welterweight Champion; 18 January 1958 – 26 December 1958	Succeeded by Emilio Marconi
