= László Papp =

Hungarian boxer (1926–2003)

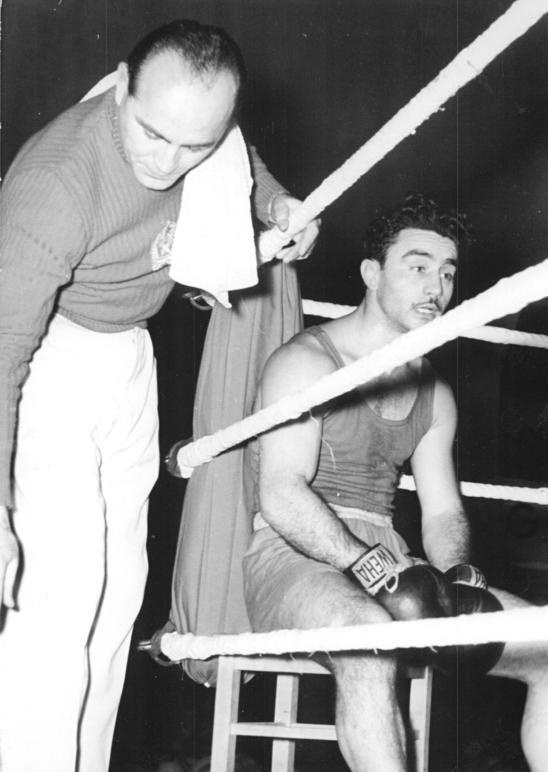
- Papp, 13 December 1955

Personal information
- Nickname: Laci Papp
- Nationality: Hungarian
- Born: László Papp; 25 March 1926 Budapest, Hungary
- Died: 16 October 2003 (aged 77) Budapest, Hungary
- Height: 1.65 m (5 ft 5 in)
- Weight: Middleweight; Light Middleweight

Boxing career
- Stance: Southpaw

Boxing record
- Total fights: 29
- Wins: 27
- Win by KO: 15
- Draws: 2
Medal record
Men's boxing
Representing Hungary
Olympic Games
Gold medal – first place	1948 London	Middleweight
Gold medal – first place	1952 Helsinki	Light Middleweight
Gold medal – first place	1956 Melbourne	Light Middleweight
European Amateur Championships
Gold medal – first place	1949 Oslo	Middleweight
Gold medal – first place	1951 Milan	Light Middleweight

László Papp (25 March 1926 – 16 October 2003) was a Hungarian professional boxer from Budapest. He was left-handed and won gold medals in the 1948 Summer Olympics in London, the 1952 Summer Olympics in Helsinki, and the 1956 Summer Olympics held in Melbourne, Australia. In his final Olympic competition he became the first boxer in Olympic history to win three successive gold medals. He won 12 of his 13 Olympic fights without losing a round, dropping only one, in his last Olympic final, to American boxer José Torres. There was not another triple gold medalist for 20 years, when Cuba's Teófilo Stevenson won three, followed by another Cuban Félix Savón as the third of the three men to accomplish the feat.

== Amateur career ==
Papp was an Olympic gold medalist three times, at middleweight in London in 1948, then as a light middleweight in Helsinki in 1952 and in Melbourne in 1956. Papp also was the European amateur middleweight champion as a middleweight in 1949 at Oslo and at light middleweight at Milan in 1951. He scored 55 first-round knockouts as an amateur, his record was 301-12-6.

=== Olympic results ===
1948 London (England)

- Defeated Valfrid Resko (Finland) KO 2
- Defeated Jean Welter (Luxembourg) KO 1
- Defeated Auguste Cavignac (Belgium) KO 1
- Defeated Ivano Fontana (Italy) 3-0
- Defeated John Wright (England) 3-0

1952 Helsinki (Finland)

- Defeated Ellsworth Webb (United States) KO 2
- Defeated Charlie Chase (Canada) KO 2
- Defeated Petar Stankoff Spassoff (Bulgaria) 3-0
- Defeated Eladio Oscar Herrera (Argentina) 3-0
- Defeated Theunis Jacobus van Schalkwyk (South Africa) 3-0

1956 Melbourne (Australia)

- Defeated Alberto Saenz (Argentina) KO 3
- Defeated Zbigniew Pietrzykowski (Poland) 3-0
- Defeated José Torres (USA) 2-1

== Professional career ==
Papp, despite having hand trouble, turned professional in 1957 and immediately began rising in the Middleweight ranks. However, Hungary was a Communist country at the time and professional boxing was not permitted. Papp had to travel to Vienna, in Austria, for training and for his fights. In spite of this disadvantage, he beat several top-ranking contenders for the European Middleweight title, including veteran Tiger Jones, French champion Hippolyte Annex and Chris Christensen. After Christensen, Papp defeated Randy Sandy of the United States. In 1964, after Papp had already signed up for the world championship title bout against Joey Giardello, Hungary's Communist leadership brought his professional career to an end by denying him an exit visa.

Papp is one of the few boxers in history to ever retire undefeated in the ring. His fighting record was 27 wins, 2 draws, and no losses. 15 of his wins were by way of knockout.

== Death ==
László Papp died in Budapest in 2003.

== Honours ==
Papp was inducted into the International Boxing Hall Of Fame in 2001. In 1989 WBC President José Sulaimán gave Papp an award for 'Best amateur and professional boxer of all time' and granted him honorary champion status of the World Boxing Council.

== Professional boxing record ==
29 fights	27 wins	0 losses
By knockout	15	0
By decision	12	0
Draws	2	

No.	Result	Record	Opponent	Type	Round	Date	Location	Notes
29	Win	27–0–2	Mick Leahy	PTS	15	Oct 9, 1964	Stadthalle, Vienna, Austria	Retained EBU middleweight title
28	Win	26–0–2	Christian Christensen	KO	4 (15)	Jul 2, 1964	Forum, Copenhagen, Denmark	Retained EBU middleweight title
27	Win	25–0–2	Harry Scott	PTS	10	Mar 13, 1964	Stadthalle, Vienna, Austria	
26	Win	24–0–2	Luis Folledo	TKO	8 (15)	Dec 6, 1963	Palacio de los Deportes, Madrid, Spain	Retained EBU middleweight title
25	Win	23–0–2	Charley Cotton	KO	7 (10)	Jun 14, 1963	Messesporthalle, Cologne, West Germany	
24	Win	22–0–2	Randy Sandy	PTS	10	May 17, 1963	Stadthalle, Vienna, Austria	
23	Win	21–0–2	Peter Müller	TKO	4 (15)	Mar 30, 1963	Westfalenhalle, Dortmund, West Germany	Retained EBU middleweight title
22	Win	20–0–2	George Aldridge	TKO	15 (15)	Feb 6, 1963	Stadthalle, Vienna, Austria	Retained EBU middleweight title
21	Win	19–0–2	Hippolyte Annex	KO	9 (15)	Nov 19, 1962	Palais des Sports, Paris, France	Retained EBU middleweight title
20	Win	18–0–2	Christian Christensen	TKO	7 (15)	May 16, 1962	Stadthalle, Vienna, Austria	Won EBU middleweight title
19	Win	17–0–2	Ralph 'Tiger' Jones	PTS	10	Mar 21, 1962	Stadthalle, Vienna, Austria	
18	Win	16–0–2	Michel Francois	TKO	2 (10)	Dec 2, 1961	Messesporthalle, Cologne, West Germany	
17	Win	15–0–2	Peter Müller	TKO	4 (10)	Oct 13, 1961	Stadthalle, Vienna, Austria	
16	Win	14–0–2	Peter Müller	TKO	8 (10)	Sep 10, 1961	Eisstadion, Cologne, West Germany	
15	Win	13–0–2	Moussa Sangare	PTS	10	Apr 8, 1961	Stadthalle, Vienna, Austria	
14	Win	12–0–2	Sauveur Chiocca	PTS	10	Feb 20, 1961	Palais des Sports, Paris, France	
13	Draw	11–0–2	Giancarlo Garbelli	PTS	10	Dec 26, 1960	Palazzo dello Sport (Pad. 3 Fiera), Milan, Italy	
12	Win	11–0–1	Mohammed Boudib	KO	7 (10)	Oct 1, 1960	Dinamo Stadium, Zagreb, Croatia	
11	Win	10–0–1	Erich Walter	KO	9 (10)	Sep 23, 1960	Stadthalle, Vienna, Austria	
10	Win	9–0–1	Lou Perry	PTS	10	Feb 10, 1960	Stadthalle, Vienna, Austria	
9	Win	8–0–1	Bill Tate	KO	3 (10)	Sep 18, 1959	Stadthalle, Vienna, Austria	
8	Draw	7–0–1	Germinal Ballarin	PTS	10	Apr 13, 1959	Palais des Sports, Paris, France	
7	Win	7–0	Jean Ruellet	PTS	10	Mar 16, 1959	Stadthalle, Vienna, Austria	
6	Win	6–0	Andre Drille	PTS	10	Feb 9, 1959	Palais des Sports, Paris, France	
5	Win	5–0	Francois Anewy	KO	3 (10)	Dec 15, 1958	Palais des Sports, Paris, France	
4	Win	4–0	Hugo Kohler	KO	6 (10)	Oct 17, 1958	Stadthalle, Vienna, Austria	
3	Win	3–0	Gerhard Moll	PTS	6	Jun 28, 1957	Ernst Merck Halle, West Germany	
2	Win	2–0	Herbert Sowa	PTS	4	Jun 15, 1957	Westfalenhalle, Dortmund, West Germany	
1	Win	1–0	Alois Brand	PTS	4	May 18, 1957	Eisstadion, Cologne, West Germany	

== See also ==
- List of Hungarians
