= Graham Higham =

Australian boxer

Personal information
- Full name: Graham Nathaniel Higham
- Nationality: Australian
- Born: 24 January 1928; Margate, Queensland, Australia
- Died: 19 December 1988 (aged 60); Maroochydore, Queensland, Australia

Sport
- Sport: Boxing

Graham Nathaniel Higham (24 January 1928 – 19 December 1988) was an Australian boxer. He competed in the men's middleweight event at the 1948 Summer Olympics. At the 1948 Summer Olympics, he lost in his opening fight, to Johnny Wright of Great Britain.
