= Alessandro Mazzinghi =

Italian boxer (1938–2020)

Sandro Mazzinghi
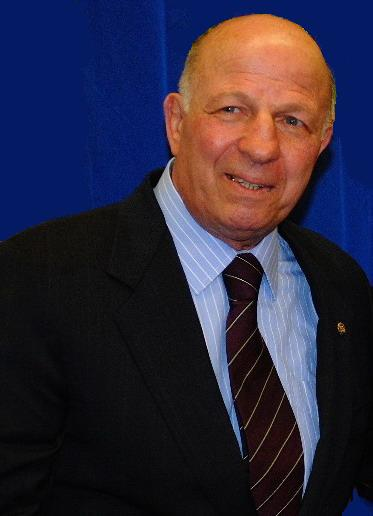
- Sandro Mazzinghi

Personal information
- Nationality: Italian
- Born: Alessandro Mazzinghi; 3 October 1938 Pontedera, Italy
- Died: 22 August 2020 (aged 81) Pontedera, Italy

Boxing career

Boxing record
- Total fights: 69
- Wins: 64
- Win by KO: 42
- Losses: 3
- Draws: 0
- No contests: 2

Alessandro "Sandro" Mazzinghi (3 October 1938 – 22 August 2020) was an Italian professional boxer who held the world light middleweight championship twice.

== Biography ==
In 1961 Mazzinghi won the Military World Championships. The same year he turned professional, following his elder brother Guido. He eventually became a European and World Champion, and had a record of 64–3–0–2 (42 KOs). Of these matches, five were valid for the European title and 8 for the World title. On 7 September 1963 he won the world light middleweight title, defeating the American Ralph Dupas by a ninth-round technical knockout in Milan. In December of the same year, a rematch took place in Sydney, Australia, and Mazzinghi won again by knockout.

He remained world champion until 1965, a year after a terrible accident. The boxer remained in critical condition for some days, with a skull fracture that would condition his career in the following years. Mazzinghi came back in the ring to defend his title in Genoa, Italy, against Tony Montano (knockout in the 12th round) and in Rome, against Fortunato Manca (winning by decision in 15 rounds).

On 18 June 1965 Mazzinghi faced Nino Benvenuti and lost by knockout in the sixth round, losing his world title. In their rematch, Mazzinghi barely escaped an early round knockout when he was floored – unable to rise in time he was saved by the bell. He rebounded from that close call to give Benvenuti a hard fight, but Benvenuti won by decision.

Mazzinghi started again and gained the Superwelter European crown in Rome, Italy, on 17 June 1966 defeating Yoland Leveque; he defended his title four times.

On 26 May 1968, Mazzinghi beat Korean Ki-Soo Kim in "San Siro" Stadium, Milan, Italy, regaining the world light middleweight crown.

On 25 October he fought against American Freddie Little, but was disqualified by the referee for an illegal blow; this decision was revoked and the result of the match was changed to a "no contest". A few days later, the Italian Boxing Federation took away the title from Mazzinghi, after the WBA wouldn't.

In 1970 he left boxing for seven years, and would make a comeback from 1977 to 1978. He retired in 1978.

== Professional boxing record ==
67 fights	64 wins	3 losses
By knockout	42	1
By decision	21	2
By disqualification	1	0

No.	Result	Record	Opponent	Type	Round	Date	Age	Location	Notes
69	Win	64–3 (2)	Jean Claude Warusfel	PTS	10	Mar 4, 1978	39 years, 152 days	Florence, Toscana, Italy	
68	Win	63–3 (2)	Gianni Mingardi	PTS	8	Dec 26, 1977	39 years, 84 days	Florence, Toscana, Italy	
67	Win	62–3 (2)	David Adkins	PTS	10	Nov 3, 1977	39 years, 31 days	Castellanza, Lombardia, Italy	
66	Win	61–3 (2)	Willie Warren	KO	8 (10)	Oct 31, 1970	32 years, 28 days	Bologna, Emilia Romagna, Italy	
65	Win	60–3 (2)	Eddie Pace	SD	10	Sep 10, 1970	31 years, 342 days	Milan, Lombardia, Italy	
64	Win	59–3 (2)	Harold Richardson	KO	5 (10)	Jul 2, 1970	31 years, 272 days	Milan, Lombardia, Italy	
63	Win	58–3 (2)	Harry Scott	PTS	10	Apr 18, 1970	31 years, 197 days	Palazzetto dello Sport, Bologna, Emilia Romagna, Italy	
62	Win	57–3 (2)	Cipriano Hernandez	KO	2 (10)	Dec 17, 1969	31 years, 75 days	Silver Slipper, Las Vegas, Nevada, U.S.	
61	NC	56–3 (2)	Wilfredo Hurst	NC	8 (10)	Mar 28, 1969	30 years, 176 days	Roma, Lazio, Italy	
60	NC	56–3 (1)	Freddie Little	NC	8 (15)	Oct 25, 1968	30 years, 22 days	Palazzetto dello Sport, Roma, Lazio, Italy	WBA and WBC junior-middleweight titles at stake; Little originally declared as the winner via knockout before referee Tomser declared the bout a no-contest
59	Win	56–3	Levi Campbell	PTS	10	Sep 14, 1968	29 years, 347 days	Florence, Toscana, Italy	
58	Win	55–3	Kim Ki-soo	SD	15	May 26, 1968	29 years, 236 days	Stadio San Siro, Milan, Lombardia, Italy	Won WBA and WBC junior-middleweight titles
57	Win	54–3	Bobby Cassidy	TKO	2 (10)	Apr 5, 1968	29 years, 185 days	Palazzetto dello Sport, Roma, Lazio, Italy	
56	Win	53–3	Art Hernandez	RTD	4 (8)	Feb 9, 1968	29 years, 129 days	Roma, Lazio, Italy	
55	Win	52–3	Jo Gonzales	KO	4 (15)	Dec 1, 1967	29 years, 59 days	Palazzetto dello Sport, Roma, Lazio, Italy	Retained European junior-middleweight title
54	Win	51–3	Wally Swift	TKO	6 (15)	Sep 9, 1967	28 years, 341 days	Milan, Lombardia, Italy	Retained European junior-middleweight title
53	Win	50–3	Gomeo Brennan	PTS	10	Jul 14, 1967	28 years, 284 days	Palazzetto dello Sport, Roma, Lazio, Italy	
52	Win	49–3	Henry Aldrich	PTS	10	Apr 7, 1967	28 years, 186 days	Palazzetto dello Sport, Roma, Lazio, Italy	
51	Win	48–3	Jean Baptiste Rolland	TKO	10 (15)	Feb 3, 1967	28 years, 123 days	Palazzo dello Sport (Pad. 3 Fiera), Milan, Lombardia, Italy	Retained European junior-middleweight title
50	Win	47–3	Bo Hogberg	TKO	14 (15)	Nov 11, 1966	28 years, 39 days	Johanneshov, Stockholm, Sweden	Retained European junior-middleweight title
49	Win	46–3	Tony Noriega	PTS	10	Oct 14, 1966	28 years, 11 days	Teramo, Abruzzo, Italy	
48	Win	45–3	Yoland Levèque	KO	12 (15)	Jun 17, 1966	27 years, 257 days	Roma, Lazio, Italy	Won European junior-middleweight title
47	Win	44–3	Herman Dixon	TKO	2 (10)	May 6, 1966	27 years, 215 days	Torino, Piemonte, Italy	
46	Win	43–3	Sugar Cliff	TKO	4 (10)	Apr 1, 1966	27 years, 180 days	Roma, Lazio, Italy	
45	Win	42–3	James Shelton	RTD	5 (10)	Feb 11, 1966	27 years, 131 days	Bologna, Emilia Romagna, Italy	
44	Loss	41–3	Nino Benvenuti	UD	15	Dec 17, 1965	27 years, 75 days	Palazzetto dello Sport, Roma, Lazio, Italy	For WBA and WBC junior-middleweight titles
43	Win	41–2	Oscar Miranda	TKO	5 (10)	Oct 15, 1965	27 years, 12 days	Torino, Piemonte, Italy	
42	Loss	40–2	Nino Benvenuti	KO	6 (15)	Jun 18, 1965	26 years, 258 days	Stadio San Siro, Milan, Lombardia, Italy	Lost WBA and WBC junior-middleweight titles
41	Win	40–1	Mel Ferguson	KO	3 (10)	Apr 30, 1965	26 years, 209 days	Genoa, Liguria, Italy	
40	Win	39–1	Isaac Logart	PTS	10	Apr 2, 1965	26 years, 181 days	Palazzetto dello Sport, Roma, Lazio, Italy	
39	Win	38–1	Isaac Logart	TKO	5 (10)	Jan 23, 1965	26 years, 112 days	Palazzo dello Sport (Pad. 3 Fiera), Milan, Lombardia, Italy	
38	Win	37–1	Fortunato Manca	PTS	15	Dec 11, 1964	26 years, 69 days	Palazzetto dello Sport, Roma, Lazio, Italy	Retained WBA and WBC junior-middleweight titles
37	Win	36–1	Gaspar Ortega	TKO	7 (10)	Nov 6, 1964	26 years, 34 days	Palazzetto dello Sport, Roma, Lazio, Italy	
36	Win	35–1	Tony Montano	TKO	12 (15)	Oct 3, 1964	26 years, 0 days	Palazzo Dello Sport, Genoa, Liguria, Italy	Retained WBA and WBC junior-middleweight titles
35	Win	34–1	Cecil Mott	KO	5 (12)	Aug 14, 1964	25 years, 316 days	Terracina, Lazio, Italy	
34	Win	33–1	Charley Austin	DQ	7 (10)	Jun 26, 1964	25 years, 267 days	Torino, Piemonte, Italy	
33	Win	32–1	Charley Austin	TKO	9 (10)	Apr 24, 1964	25 years, 204 days	Stadio Olimpico, Roma, Lazio, Italy	
32	Win	31–1	Hilario Morales	TKO	3 (10)	Apr 12, 1964	25 years, 192 days	Milan, Lombardia, Italy	
31	Win	30–1	Ralph Dupas	TKO	13 (15)	Dec 2, 1963	25 years, 60 days	Sydney Stadium, Sydney, New South Wales, Australia	Retained WBA and WBC junior-middleweight titles
30	Win	29–1	Ralph Dupas	TKO	9 (15)	Sep 7, 1963	24 years, 339 days	Velodromo Vigorelli, Milan, Lombardia, Italy	Won WBA and WBC junior-middleweight titles
29	Win	28–1	Mohamed Sahib	TKO	8 (10)	Jul 13, 1963	24 years, 283 days	Pontedera, Toscana, Italy	
28	Win	27–1	Wilf Greaves	KO	5 (10)	Jun 7, 1963	24 years, 247 days	Velodromo Vigorelli, Milan, Lombardia, Italy	
27	Win	26–1	Don Fullmer	TKO	8 (10)	May 5, 1963	24 years, 214 days	Velodromo Vigorelli, Milan, Lombardia, Italy	
26	Win	25–1	Tony Montano	UD	10	Apr 5, 1963	24 years, 184 days	Palazzetto dello Sport, Roma, Lazio, Italy	
25	Win	24–1	Rocky Randell	TKO	1 (10)	Mar 8, 1963	24 years, 156 days	Milan, Lombardia, Italy	
24	Win	23–1	Joseph NGan	KO	4 (8)	Mar 1, 1963	24 years, 149 days	Florence, Toscana, Italy	
23	Win	22–1	Hippolyte Annex	RTD	9 (10)	Jan 28, 1963	24 years, 117 days	Palais des Sports, Paris, Paris, France	
22	Win	21–1	Francesco Fiori	PTS	8	Dec 14, 1962	24 years, 72 days	Palazzetto dello Sport, Roma, Lazio, Italy	
21	Win	20–1	Fabio Bettini	PTS	8	Nov 9, 1962	24 years, 37 days	Milan, Lombardia, Italy	
20	Win	19–1	Charles Attali	TKO	1 (10)	Oct 15, 1962	24 years, 12 days	Palais des Sports, Paris, Paris, France	
19	Win	18–1	Daniel Leullier	PTS	8	Sep 24, 1962	23 years, 356 days	Bologna, Emilia Romagna, Italy	
18	Win	17–1	Fabio Bettini	PTS	8	Aug 19, 1962	23 years, 320 days	Casino Municipale, San Remo, Liguria, Italy	
17	Loss	16–1	Giampaolo Melis	PTS	8	Jul 27, 1962	23 years, 297 days	Roma, Lazio, Italy	
16	Win	16–0	Charley Kassem	KO	1 (10)	Jul 18, 1962	23 years, 288 days	Florence, Toscana, Italy	
15	Win	15–0	Paolo Cottino	KO	3 (10)	Jun 30, 1962	23 years, 270 days	Saint-Vincent, Valle d'Aosta, Italy	
14	Win	14–0	Jackie Cailleau	PTS	8	Jun 20, 1962	23 years, 260 days	Florence, Toscana, Italy	
13	Win	13–0	Claude Canu	TKO	4 (8)	Jun 6, 1962	23 years, 246 days	Prato, Toscana, Italy	
12	Win	12–0	Teddy Schall	KO	4 (8)	Apr 2, 1962	23 years, 181 days	Bologna, Emilia Romagna, Italy	
11	Win	11–0	Mohamed Seba	TKO	5 (8)	Mar 23, 1962	23 years, 171 days	Florence, Toscana, Italy	
10	Win	10–0	Gerhard Moll	TKO	5 (8)	Feb 23, 1962	23 years, 143 days	Florence, Toscana, Italy	
9	Win	9–0	Nic Maric	PTS	6	Feb 16, 1962	23 years, 136 days	Milan, Lombardia, Italy	
8	Win	8–0	Ahmed ben Hamida	TKO	3 (6)	Feb 5, 1962	23 years, 125 days	Bologna, Emilia Romagna, Italy	
7	Win	7–0	Claudio Buniva	PTS	6	Jan 19, 1962	23 years, 108 days	Palazzetto dello Sport, Roma, Lazio, Italy	
6	Win	6–0	Guglielmo Paulon	TKO	3 (8)	Jan 4, 1962	23 years, 93 days	Bologna, Emilia Romagna, Italy	
5	Win	5–0	Francesco Pondrelli	TKO	2 (8)	Dec 26, 1961	23 years, 84 days	Bologna, Emilia Romagna, Italy	
4	Win	4–0	Germano Cavalieri	KO	2 (8)	Dec 15, 1961	23 years, 73 days	Florence, Toscana, Italy	
3	Win	3–0	Renato Ravasi	TKO	3 (8)	Nov 9, 1961	23 years, 37 days	Palazzetto dello Sport, Roma, Lazio, Italy	
2	Win	2–0	Mario Della Corte	PTS	6	Oct 20, 1961	23 years, 17 days	Florence, Toscana, Italy	
1	Win	1–0	Severino Gagliardi	KO	2 (6)	Sep 15, 1961	22 years, 347 days	Teatro Puccini, Florence, Toscana, Italy	

== Titles in boxing ==
=== Major world titles ===
- WBA light middleweight champion (154 lbs) (2×)
- WBC light middleweight champion (154 lbs) (2×)

=== Regional/International titles ===
- European light middleweight champion (154 lbs)

=== Undisputed titles ===
- Undisputed light middleweight champion (2×)

== See also ==
- Legends of Italian sport - Walk of Fame
- List of world light-middleweight boxing champions

Sporting positions
Regional boxing titles
Preceded by Yoland Levèque	EBU super welterweight champion 17 June 1966 – 1968; Vacated	Vacant Title next held by Remo Golfarini
World boxing titles
Preceded by Ralph Dupas	WBA super welterweight champion 7 September 1963 – 18 June 1965	Succeeded by Nino Benvenuti
Preceded by Ralph Dupas	WBC super welterweight champion 7 September 1963 – 18 June 1965	Succeeded by Nino Benvenuti
Preceded by Ralph Dupas	Undisputed super welterweight champion 7 September 1963 – 18 June 1965	Succeeded by Nino Benvenuti
Preceded by Kim Ki-soo	WBA super welterweight champion 26 May 1968 – November 1968; Stripped of title	Vacant Title next held by Freddie Little
Preceded by Kim Ki-soo	WBC super welterweight champion 26 May 1968 – 8 November 1968; Stripped	Vacant Title next held by Freddie Little
Preceded by Kim Ki-soo	Undisputed super welterweight champion 26 May 1968 – 8 November 1968; Titles fragmented	Vacant Title next held by Freddie Little
