= John Nuttall (boxer) =

Indian boxer

Personal information
- Full name: James Oswell Hughes Nuttall
- Nationality: Indian
- Born: 11 April 1919; Calcutta, Bengal Presidency, British India
- Died: 7 November 2005 (aged 86); England

Sport
- Sport: Boxing

James Oswell Hughes Nuttall (11 April 1919 – 7 November 2005) was an Indian boxer. He was born in an Anglo-Indian family from Calcutta. He was employed in the Calcutta Police and also played cricket and field hockey for Bengal. He competed in the men's middleweight event at the 1948 Summer Olympics. At the 1948 Summer Olympics, he lost to Ivano Fontana of Italy.
