= Agnes Sime Baxter =

Canadian mathematician

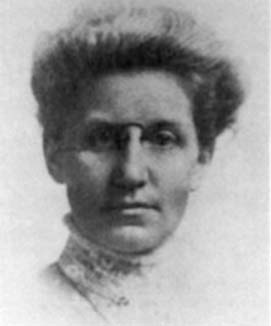
- Born: March 18, 1870; Halifax, Nova Scotia, Canada
- Died: March 9, 1917 (aged 46); Columbia, Missouri, United States

Academic background
- Education: Dalhousie University; Cornell University

Agnes Sime Baxter (Hill) (18 March 1870 – 9 March 1917) was a Canadian-born mathematician. She studied at Dalhousie University, receiving her BA in 1891, and her MA in 1892. She received her Ph.D. from Cornell University in 1895; her dissertation was "On Abelian integrals", a resume of Neumann's Abelian integral with comments and applications."

== Biography ==
Agnes Sime Baxter was born on March 18, 1870, in Halifax, Nova Scotia. The Baxter family had emigrated to Canada from Scotland. Her father, Robert Baxter, was manager of the Halifax Gas Light Company, having managed a Scottish electric light company before moving to Nova Scotia.

Baxter enrolled at Dalhousie University in 1887. Her primary courses of study were mathematics and mathematical physics. Despite the relative lack of female scholars in these areas, Baxter received her bachelor's degree in 1891 and was the first women at the university to gain an honours degree. She received multiple awards at graduation, including the Sir William Young Medal for highest standing in mathematics and mathematical physics. She completed her master's degree at Dalhousie in 1892.

From 1892 to 1894, she held a fellowship at Cornell University in New York. On the completion of her thesis, "On Abelian integrals, a resume of Neumann's 'Abelsche Integrele' with comments and applications," she became the second Canadian woman and the fourth North American woman to receive a Ph.D. in mathematics. Her supervisor James Edward Oliver's mathematical notes were edited by Baxter in 1894 and later published.

Agnes Baxter married Dr. Albert Ross Hill on August 20, 1896. The marriage produced two daughters. Agnes chose not to teach at the institutions where her husband was a professor, although Albert credited her with assisting him in his work.

Agnes Ross Hill died on March 9, 1917, in Columbia, Missouri, after protracted illness and was buried in the Columbia Cemetery. On her death, her husband Albert Ross Hill wanted his wife's memory to be preserved and donated $1,000 to Dalhousie University for the purchase of a collection of books at Dalhousie University. The university also created the Agnes Baxter Reading Room within the Department of Mathematics, Statistics and Computing Sciences.
