= Příhoda =

Příhoda (feminine: Příhodová) is a Czech surname. Notable people with the surname include:

- Frank Prihoda (1921–2022), Australian alpine skier
- István Prihoda (1891–1965), Hungarian sports shooter
- Miloslav Příhoda (1923–1998), Czech boxer
- Miloslav Příhoda Jr. (born 1990), Czech equestrian
- Radek Příhoda (born 1974), Czech football referee
- Váša Příhoda (1900–1960), Czech violinist

== See also ==
- 40410 Příhoda
