= Mick Leahy (boxer) =

Irish-British boxer (1935–2010)

Personal information
- Nationality: British
- Born: Michael Leahy; 12 March 1935 Cork, Ireland
- Died: 5 January 2010 (aged 74) Coventry, England
- Weight: Middleweight

Boxing career
- Stance: Orthodox

Boxing record
- Total fights: 72
- Wins: 51
- Win by KO: 16
- Losses: 11
- Draws: 10

Mick Leahy (12 March 1935 – 5 January 2010) was an Irish-born British professional boxer. Born in Cork, he became a British citizen in 1961 and lived the rest of his life in Coventry. In a career which spanned from 1956 to 1965, Leahy won the British Middleweight title and fought such names as László Papp and Nino Benvenuti.

Leahy began boxing as an amateur in Cork during the 1950s, where he became the Amateur Irish Lightweight Champion. After moving to Coventry to work in the building trade he was spotted by the manager George Middleton and he turned professional in 1956.

== Professional career ==
Leahy made his professional debut on 22 October 1956 in Leicester. It did not take long for Leahy to record his first victory as his opponent, Steve Gee, was knocked out during the first round. After remaining undefeated throughout the first year of his career (16 wins and 1 draw), Leahy suffered his first loss on 28 October 1957 in Birmingham, where he was knocked out in one round by Tommy Tagoe.

Leahy fought 13 more times in the UK (8 wins, 3 losses and 2 draws) before travelling overseas to fight in Australia and New Zealand from April to October 1959. Leahy fought 11 times in Australia, compiling a record of 8 wins and 3 losses which included bouts in Melbourne, Sydney and Brisbane. In his last bout before returning to the UK Leahy lost a 12-round decision to Tuna Scanlan in Wellington.

Belfast, Northern Ireland was the location for Leahy's first fight in the UK since returning from Australia. The fight took place on 23 April 1960, Leahy made a winning return as he beat Al Sharpe by a decision over 8 rounds. On 23 February 1961 Leahy unsuccessfully challenged the Welshman Brian Curvis for the British and Commonwealth Welterweight titles, he was knocked out in the eighth round. On 10 November 1962 Leahy travelled to the United States to fight Joey Archer. Although Leahy was knocked down twice, the fight, which took place at Madison Square Garden, went the 10 round distance, all three judges scored the fight to Archer.

Leahy's second shot at the British title came on 28 May 1963 when he challenged the Middleweight champion George Aldridge in Nottingham. Leahy, cheered on by 3,000 Irish fans, took just 1 minute and 45 seconds to knock Aldridge out and thus become the British champion. After the fight Sugar Ray Robinson, Muhammad Ali and Randy Turpin jumped into the ring to embrace the new champion.

Leahy then went on to beat Gil Diaz in Birmingham and launched an unsuccessful challenge for the Commonwealth Middleweight title against Gomeo Brennan in London. There were two further losses to Tuna Scanlan and Dante Pelaez (controversially stopped due to a cut over Leahy's right eye); plus a unanimous decision victory in Boston over Larry Carney.

In 1964, Leahy went up against a 43-year-old Sugar Ray Robinson in Paisley, Scotland. Although Robinson at this point was considered past his best, he had the support of the Scottish crowd behind him, and managed to trouble the much younger Leahy with his handspeed and volume of punches. However, he was only able to sustain that level for two out of every three minutes, and Leahy won the fight by decision after 10 close-fought rounds.

After the Robinson fight Leahy travelled to Vienna, Austria to challenge the undefeated Hungarian László Papp for the EBU title. Papp was announced as the winner after fifteen rounds, it was to be Papp's last fight as he retired shortly afterwards. In his next fight Leahy attempted to defend his British middleweight crown for the first time, however, he once again lost a 15-round decision, enabling Wally Swift to become the new champion. After losing to future world champion Nino Benvenuti in Milan, Leahy fought for a final time on 19 March 1965, losing to Jupp Elze in Cologne, Germany.

== Later years and death ==
Leahy's boxing career came to an abrupt end in September 1965. As he was driving to see his manager in Leamington Spa, he ran into the back of a car transporter which was parked up; its driver asleep and its lights off. As a result of the crash Leahy lost the sight of his left eye and his hearing was damaged. In 2003 Leahy was on a family trip to New York with his wife Teresa; sister-in-law Eileen and eldest son, Noel; when it became apparent that his memory was failing. He was diagnosed with Alzheimer's disease in 2004 and was cared for by Teresa – to whom he had been married for 52 years – at home until it was clear that he needed professional care. He attended a local care home and then the Caludon Centre at Coventry's Walsgrave Hospital. He then moved into and spent the last eighteen months of his life at Evedale care home in Coventry. In December 2009 he developed colitis and was again admitted to Walsgrave Hospital. This in turn developed into bronchopneumonia complicated by Alzheimer's and he died on 5 January 2010 at the age of 74. Approximately 400 people attended his funeral, which was held in his hometown of Coventry and filmed by the BBC.
