= Héctor García (Argentine boxer) =

Argentine boxer

Personal information
- Nationality: Argentine
- Born: 11 December 1926

Sport
- Sport: Boxing

Héctor García (born 11 December 1926) was an Argentine boxer. He competed in the men's middleweight event at the 1948 Summer Olympics. At the 1948 Summer Olympics, he lost to Johnny Wright of Great Britain.
