= Jamie Oliver (disambiguation) =

Jamie Oliver (born 1975) is an English chef.

Jamie Oliver may also refer to:

== People ==
- Richard J Oliver (born 1975), formerly known as Jamie Oliver, Welsh artist, fitness instructor and musician

== Television ==
- Jamie's Kitchen, 2002 British television series
- Jamie's School Dinners, 2005 British television series
- Jamie Oliver's Food Revolution, 2010–2011 American television series
- Jamie & Jimmy's Friday Night Feast, 2014–2021 British television series

== Video games ==
- What's Cooking? with Jamie Oliver, 2008 cooking video game

== See also ==
- James Oliver (disambiguation), multiple people
- Jaime Oliver (1927–1998), Spaniard boxer
