= Ken La Grange =

South African boxer

Personal information
- Nationality: South African
- Born: 21 April 1923; Germiston, South Africa
- Died: 25 June 2001 (aged 78); Pretoria, South Africa

Sport
- Sport: Boxing

Ken La Grange (21 April 1923 – 25 June 2001) was a South African boxer. He competed in the men's middleweight event at the 1948 Summer Olympics.
