= Dogomar Martínez =

Uruguayan boxer

Personal information
- Born: 30 July 1929; Montevideo, Uruguay
- Died: 7 February 2016 (aged 86)

Sport
- Sport: Boxing

Dogomar Martínez (30 July 1929 – 7 February 2016) was a Uruguayan boxer. He competed in the men's middleweight event at the 1948 Summer Olympics.
