= Tommy Molloy =

Personal information
- Nationality: British
- Born: 9 February 1934 Liverpool, Lancashire, England
- Died: 8 April 2013 (aged 79) Liverpool, Merseyside, England
- Weight: Welterweight

Boxing career

Boxing record
- Total fights: 44
- Wins: 34
- Win by KO: 12
- Losses: 6
- Draws: 2
- No contests: 1

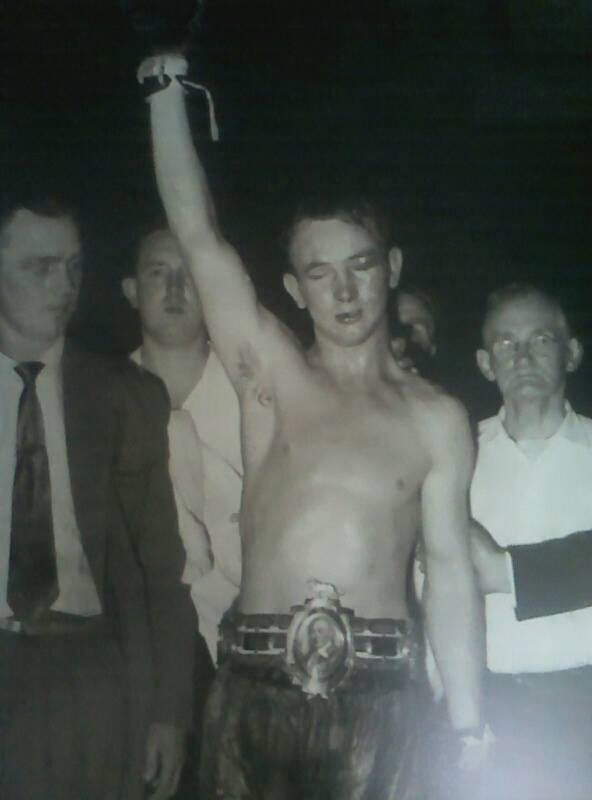

Tommy Molloy (9 February 1934 – 8 April 2013) was a British boxer who was British welterweight champion between 1958 and 1960.

== Career ==
Born in Liverpool, Molloy began boxing at the St. Francis ABC at the age of 10, going on to a successful amateur career including several titles whilst serving in the British Army including BAOR, Army and ISBA Championships. He turned professional in February 1955 and won his first 23 fights up to the end of 1956 before drawing with Jimmy Newman in March 1957 at the Royal Albert Hall.

He was still unbeaten in July 1958 when he faced Newman for the British welterweight title vacated by Peter Waterman. Molloy beat Newman on points to become British champion. His next fight, to Johnny Melfah, was his first defeat, Molloy being disqualified in the third round. In June 1959 he was beaten on points by Brian Husband. He made a successful first defence of his British title in October 1959, stopping Albert Carroll in the twelfth round at Liverpool Stadium. He lost the title in February 1960 when he was beaten on points by Wally Swift in Nottingham. His next fight was a defeat at the hands of Duilio Loi in Milan.

Molloy's final fight was in May 1963, and he went on to be a trainer after retiring from boxing.

Tommy Molloy died on 8 April 2013 at the Royal Liverpool University Hospital after suffering a heart attack, aged 79.

Tommy's brother Jimmy was also a professional boxer and his manager.
