= Jaime Oliver =

Spanish boxer (1927–1998)

Personal information
- Nationality: Spanish
- Born: 1 August 1927 Santa Maria del Camí, Mallorca, Spain
- Died: 1998 (aged 70–71) Santa Maria del Camí, Mallorca, Spain

Sport
- Sport: Boxing

Jaume "Jim" Oliver Frontera (1 August 1927 – 1998), also known by his Spanish name Jaime Oliver Frontera, was a Spanish boxer and professional wrestler. He would start his training in a gym and would compete for Spain in men's boxing at the 1948 Summer Olympics. There, he would be the first Mallorcan boxer to compete at the Olympic Games but would be defeated in the first round of the men's middleweight event. He would later become a professional in the sport but would switch to wrestling.

A year after starting wrestling, he would become the European mid-heavyweight champion. Frontera would be banned from wrestling in Spain after he had attacked a referee but would continue to wrestle outside of the country. He would retire from sport in 1964 and occasionally acted in movies that featured wrestling.

== Biography ==
Jaume "Jim" Oliver Frontera was born on 1 August 1927 in Santa Maria del Camí in Mallorca. His brother Toni was a wrestler, becoming the European light-weight champion on one occasion. Prior to his sporting career, Frontera would train at the Gimnasio Baleares owned by Jaume Ferrer. He would compete at the 1948 Summer Olympics in London, Great Britain, representing Spain in men's boxing. There, he would be the first Mallorcan boxer to compete at the Olympic Games.

He would compete in the first round of the men's middleweight event on 7 August. There, he would be defeated by Moustafa Fahim of Egypt after the referee stopped the contest as the referee had determined Frontera could not continue the match. He would place equal seventeenth overall out of the 25 competitors that competed in the event. After the 1948 Summer Games, Frontera would become a professional boxer but would turn to wrestling in 1951 as he did not succeed during his professional career as a boxer.

A year after starting the sport, he would become the European mid-heavyweight champion upon defeating wrestler Jose “Iron Man” Tarres. The following year, he would attack a referee which resulted in the referee losing six teeth. Due to this, Frontera would be banned from wrestling in the nation but would compete in other places such as Paris and London. He would retire in 1964 and became a businessman and aviator, also acting in films that featured wrestling. Frontera would later die in 1998 in Santa Maria del Camí.
