= Bertil Ahlin =

Swedish boxer (1927–2008)

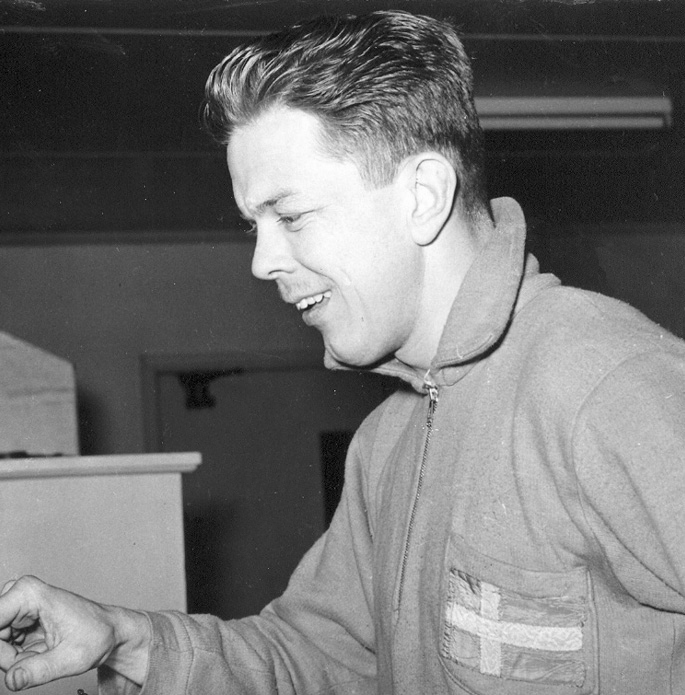

Personal information
- Born: 17 March 1927 Finspång, Sweden
- Died: 6 August 2008 (aged 81) Hässelby, Sweden

Sport
- Sport: Boxing
- Club: BK Akilles, Norrköping
Medal record
Representing Sweden
European Championships
Silver medal – second place	1947 Dublin	Bantamweight

Nils Bertil Ahlin (17 March 1927 – 6 August 2008) was a Swedish bantamweight boxer who won a silver medal at the 1947 European Amateur Boxing Championships. He competed at the 1948 Summer Olympics, but was eliminated in the first round of the tournament, losing to Salvador Rivera of Peru.

== 1948 Olympic results ==
Below is the record of Bertil Ahlin, a Swedish bantamweight boxer who competed at the 1948 London Olympics:

- Round of 32: lost to Salvador Rivera (Peru) by decision
