= Christen Christensen =

Christen Christensen may refer to:

- Christen Christensen (figure skater) (1904–1969), Norwegian figure skater
- Christen Christensen (politician) (1826–1900), Norwegian military officer and politician
- Christen Christensen (sculptor) (1806–1845) Danish sculptor and medal-maker
- Christen Christensen (shipowner) (1845–1923), Norwegian ship owner

== See also ==
- Christian Christensen (disambiguation)
- Chris Christensen, Norwegian swimmer
- Chris Christenson, Norwegian-American figure skater
