= Mick McKeon =

Irish boxer (c. 1923–1987)

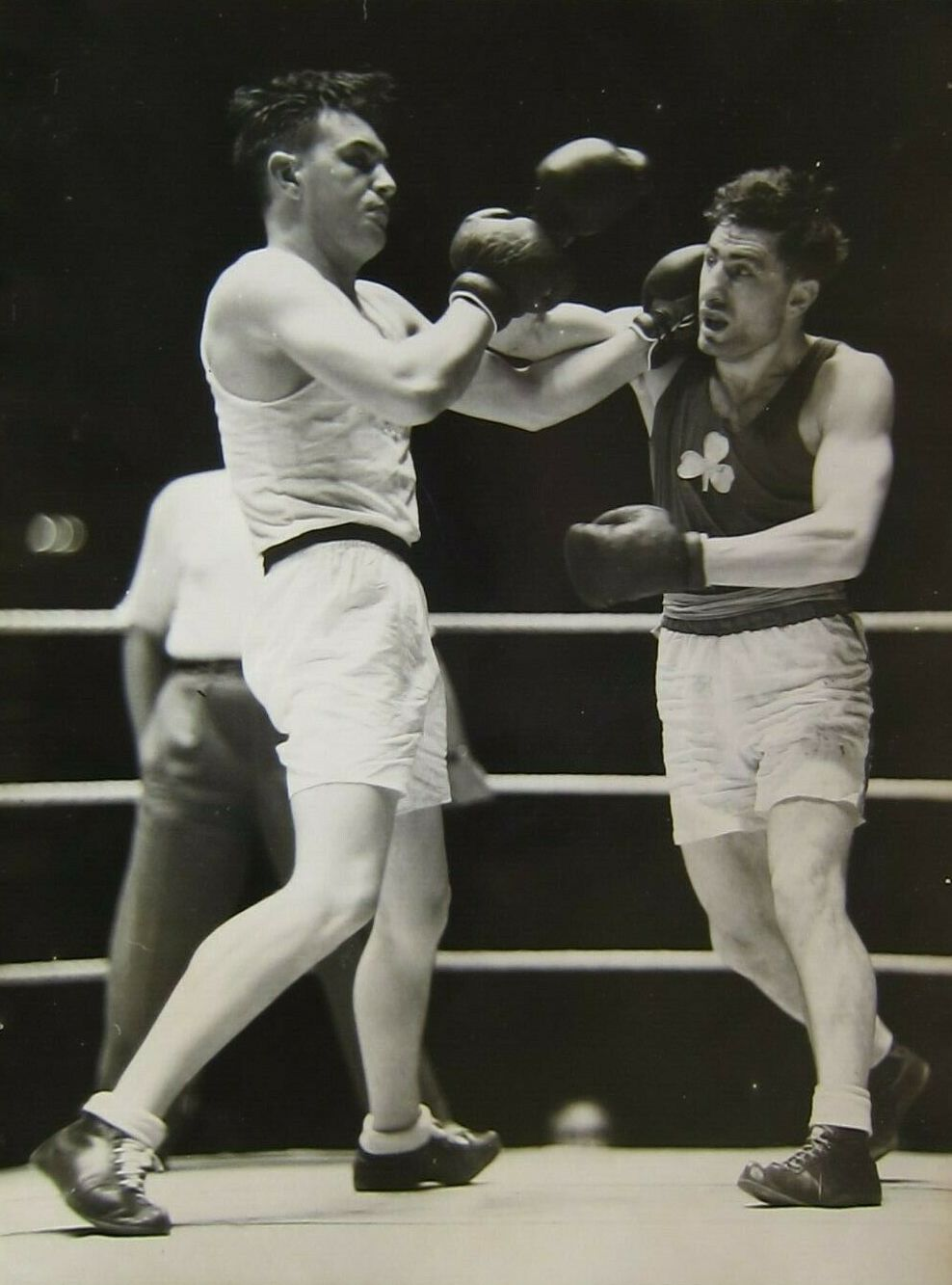

Personal information
- Full name: Michael McKeon
- Nationality: Irish
- Born: c. 1923
- Died: 15 July 1987

Sport
- Sport: Boxing

Michael McKeon (c. 1923 – 15 July 1987) was an Irish boxer. He competed in the men's middleweight event at the 1948 Summer Olympics. At the 1948 Summer Olympics, he reached the bronze medal bout, but lost via a walkover to Ivano Fontana of Italy.
