= Kim Ki-soo =

South Korean boxer (1939–1997)

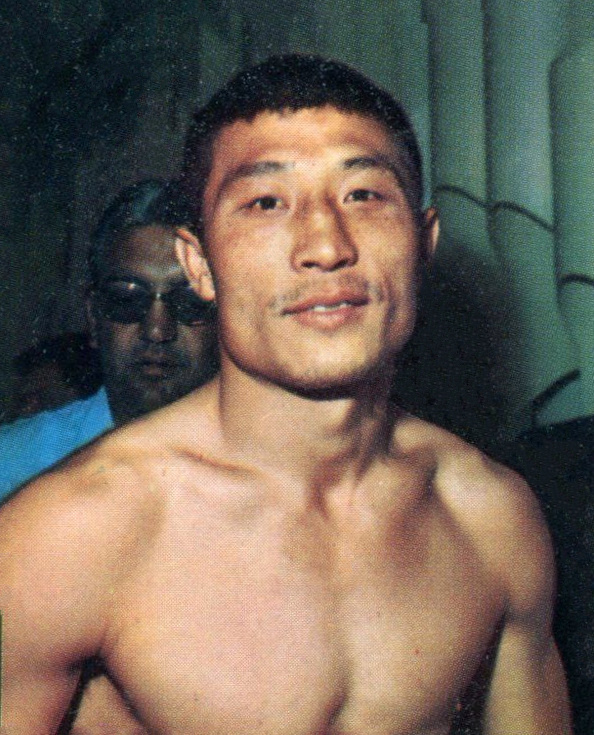
- Kim Ki-soo c. 1968

Personal information
- Nationality: South Korean
- Born: Kim Ki-soo; September 17, 1939 Pukchong County, Japanese Korea
- Died: 10 June 1997 (aged 57) Seoul, South Korea
- Height: 5 ft 7 in (170 cm)
- Weight: Light-middleweight; Middleweight

Boxing career
- Reach: 69 1/2 in (177 cm)
- Stance: Southpaw

Boxing record
- Total fights: 37
- Wins: 33
- Win by KO: 17
- Losses: 2
- Draws: 2
Medal record
Representing South Korea
Asian Games
Gold medal – first place	Tokyo 1958	Welterweight

Kim Ki-soo (Korean: 김기수; Hanja: 金基洙; September 17, 1939 – June 10, 1997) was a South Korean professional boxer who competed from 1961 to 1969. He was South Korea's first world boxing champion, having held the undisputed World Boxing Association (WBA) and World Boxing Council (WBC) super-welterweight titles from 1966 to 1968.

== Amateur career ==
Kim graduated from Kyung Hee University's College of Physical Education. He competed in boxing at the 1958 Asian Games in Tokyo, where he earned the gold medal of the welterweight division by defeating Soren Pirjanian of Iran, on points, in the final. He went on to represent South Korea as a welterweight at the 1960 Rome Olympic Games, where he defeated Henry Perry (Ireland) on points, but then lost to Nino Benvenuti (Italy) on points.

== Professional career ==
Kim turned professional in 1961, winning the South Korean Junior Middleweight title on his pro debut. He captured the WBC, WBA and Lineal light middleweight title when he upset Nino Benvenuti by split decision in 1966. He defended the belt twice before losing it to Sandro Mazzinghi in 1968 by split decision. He retired the following year.

== Later life ==
After his retirement, Kim worked as a boxing coach. He later started his own company, and was successful in business. He died of liver cancer on 10 June 1997, at the age of 57. He was survived by his wife Jeong Ha-ja (鄭夏子), two sons, and two daughters.

== Professional boxing record ==
37 fights	33 wins	2 losses
By knockout	17	0
By decision	16	2
Draws	2	

No.	Result	Record	Opponent	Type	Round	Date	Location	Notes
37	Win	33–2–2	Hisao Minami	PTS	12	Mar 1, 1969	Seoul, South Korea	Won OPBF middleweight title
36	Loss	32–2–2	Hisao Minami	MD	12	Nov 20, 1968	Osaka, Japan	Lost OPBF middleweight title
35	Loss	32–1–2	Sandro Mazzinghi	SD	15	May 26, 1968	Stadio San Siro, Milan, Italy	Lost WBA and WBC super-welterweight titles
34	Win	32–0–2	Benkei Fujikura	UD	10	Apr 4, 1968	Tokyo, Japan	
33	Win	31–0–2	Yoshiaki Akasaka	PTS	10	Mar 11, 1968	Tokyo, Japan	
32	Win	30–0–2	Manfredo Alipala	PTS	12	Feb 17, 1968	Seoul, South Korea	Retained OPBF middleweight title
31	Win	29–0–2	Apidej Sithiran	PTS	10	Nov 8, 1967	Bangkok, Thailand	
30	Win	28–0–2	Freddie Little	SD	15	Oct 3, 1967	Dongdaemun Baseball Stadium, Seoul, South Korea	Retained WBA and WBC super-welterweight titles
29	Win	27–0–2	Nakao Sasazaki	KO	6 (12)	Sep 7, 1967	Tokyo, Japan	Retained OPBF middleweight title
28	Win	26–0–2	George Carter	KO	5 (10)	Mar 25, 1967	Seoul, South Korea	
27	Win	25–0–2	Stan Harrington	UD	15	Dec 17, 1966	Changchung Gymnasium, Seoul, South Korea	Retained WBA and WBC super-welterweight titles
26	Win	24–0–2	Ken Sato	KO	4 (12)	Nov 5, 1966	Seoul, South Korea	
25	Win	23–0–2	Nino Benvenuti	SD	15	Jun 25, 1966	Changchung Gymnasium, Seoul, South Korea	Won WBA and WBC super-welterweight titles
24	Win	22–0–2	Hideaki Takada	KO	10 (12)	Apr 30, 1966	Seoul, South Korea	Retained OPBF middleweight title
23	Win	21–0–2	Ben Argoncillo	KO	9 (?)	Jan 23, 1966	Seoul, South Korea	
22	Win	20–0–2	Sakuji Shinozawa	KO	7 (10)	Oct 30, 1965	Seoul, South Korea	
21	Win	19–0–2	Masao Gondo	PTS	10	Sep 20, 1965	Tokyo, Japan	
20	Win	18–0–2	Fumio Kaizu	PTS	12	Jun 19, 1965	Seoul, South Korea	Retained OPBF middleweight title
19	Win	17–0–2	Masao Gondo	PTS	10	Apr 17, 1965	Seoul, South Korea	
18	Win	16–0–2	Han Jung-il	KO	4 (?)	Mar 28, 1965	Busan, South Korea	
17	Win	15–0–2	Kazuto Fujiyama	KO	4 (?)	Mar 6, 1965	Seoul, South Korea	
16	Win	14–0–2	Fumio Kaizu	KO	6 (12)	Jan 10, 1965	Tokyo, Japan	Won OPBF middleweight title
15	Win	13–0–2	Yoshiaki Akasaka	RTD	7 (10)	Nov 21, 1964	Seoul, South Korea	
14	Draw	12–0–2	Kim Deuk-bong	PTS	10	Oct 10, 1964	Seoul, South Korea	
13	Win	12–0–1	Kang Kyu-soon	KO	8 (?)	Sep 20, 1964	Seoul, South Korea	
12	Win	11–0–1	Roberto Pena	PTS	10	Mar 18, 1964	Metropolitan Gymnasium, Seoul, South Korea	
11	Win	10–0–1	George Carter	KO	6 (?)	Jan 22, 1964	Tokyo, Japan	
10	Win	9–0–1	Noboru Saito	KO	6 (10)	Dec 22, 1963	Yasaka Hall, Kyoto, Japan	
9	Win	8–0–1	Kang Se-chul	PTS	10	Dec 14, 1963	Seoul, South Korea	Retained South Korea middleweight title
8	Win	7–0–1	Kang Kyu-soon	PTS	10	Jul 2, 1963	Yeosu, South Korea	
7	Win	6–0–1	Kang Kyu-soon	PTS	10	May 24, 1963	Busan, South Korea	
6	Win	5–0–1	Roberto Pena	KO	6 (?)	May 18, 1963	Seoul, South Korea	
5	Draw	4–0–1	Sakuji Shinozawa	TD	3 (10)	Jul 29, 1962	Tokyo, Japan	
4	Win	4–0	Makoto Watanabe	KO	3 (?)	Jul 1, 1962	Tokyo, Japan	
3	Win	3–0	Ansano Lee	TKO	6 (10)	Dec 20, 1961	Seoul, South Korea	
2	Win	2–0	Kang Se-chul	KO	7 (?)	Nov 1, 1961	Seoul, South Korea	Date unknown
1	Win	1–0	Kang Se-chul	PTS	10	Oct 1, 1961	Seoul, South Korea	Won South Korea middleweight title

== Titles in boxing ==
=== Major world titles ===
- WBA light middleweight champion (154 lbs)
- WBC light middleweight champion (154 lbs)

=== Regional/International titles ===
- South Korea middleweight champion (160 lbs)
- OPBF middleweight champion (160 lbs) (2×)

=== Undisputed titles ===
- Undisputed light middleweight champion

== See also ==
- List of world light-middleweight boxing champions

Sporting positions
World boxing titles
Preceded by Nino Benvenuti	WBA super-welterweight champion June 25, 1966 – May 26, 1968	Succeeded by Alessandro Mazzinghi
Preceded by Nino Benvenuti	WBC super-welterweight champion June 25, 1966 – May 26, 1968	Succeeded by Alessandro Mazzinghi
Preceded by Nino Benvenuti	Undisputed super-welterweight champion June 25, 1966 – May 26, 1968	Succeeded by Alessandro Mazzinghi
