= Guido Mazzinghi =

Italian boxer (1932–1996)

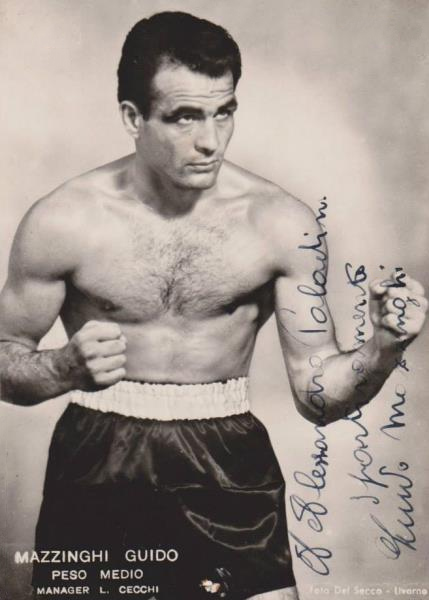

Personal information
- Born: 14 May 1932 Pontedera, Italy
- Died: 6 October 1996 (aged 64)
- Height: 1.73 m (5 ft 8 in)
- Weight: Middleweight

Boxing career

Boxing record
- Total fights: 36
- Wins: 35
- Win by KO: 19
- Losses: 1
- Draws: 0

Guido Mazzinghi (14 May 1932 – 6 October 1996) was an Italian middleweight boxer. He competed in the 1952 Summer Olympics, but was eliminated in the third bout. In 1954 he turned professional and retired in 1957 as a reigning Italian champion with a record of 35 wins out of 36 bouts. His younger brother Alessandro was also a professional boxer.
