= Peter Müller (boxer) =

Swiss boxer (1928–2013)

Personal information
- Nationality: Swiss
- Born: 6 June 1928; Wabern bei Bern, Switzerland
- Died: April 2013 (aged 84)

Sport
- Sport: Boxing

Peter Müller (6 June 1928 – April 2013) was a Swiss boxer. He competed in the men's welterweight event at the 1952 Summer Olympics.
