= Miloslav Příhoda =

Czechoslovak boxer

Personal information
- Nationality: Czechoslovak
- Born: 16 February 1923
- Died: 22 August 1998 (aged 75); Prague, Czech Republic

Sport
- Sport: Boxing

Miloslav Příhoda (16 February 1923 – 22 August 1998) was a Czechoslovak boxer. He competed in the men's middleweight event at the 1948 Summer Olympics.
