= Hippolyte Annex =

French boxer

Personal information
- Nationality: French
- Born: 14 February 1933 Pézenas, France
- Died: 21 February 2021 (aged 88) Montpellier
- Weight: Welterweight; Middleweight

Boxing career

Boxing record
- Total fights: 37
- Wins: 28
- Win by KO: 19
- Losses: 3
- Draws: 6

Hippolyte Annex (14 February 1933 - 21 February 2021) was a French former professional boxer. He was four times French champion, holding the French welterweight title from 1960 when he beat Michel Lombardet to 1961 and the middleweight title from 1961 to 1963. In 1962, he unsuccessfully fought Laszlo Papp for the EBU European middleweight title.

== Professional career ==
Annex's first professional fight was against Ceslaw Dudek on 12 April 1959 in Paris, winning by a knock out. In 37 professional bouts, Annex won 28 (19 by knock outs), drew 6 and lost 3 (all KOs).

A proposed bout in Paris with Sugar Ray Robinson was announced in 1962 but did not happen.

Annex's last fight was on 16 June 1963 at the St. Nazaire Stadium, Saint-Nazaire, Loire-Atlantique, France, when he was knocked out by the Senegalese boxer Souleymane Diallo.

In 2007, his home town of Pézenas honoured Annex by naming a street after him. A gymnasium in the town's sports park has been named after him since 2016.

Annex died on 21 February 2021 in Montpellier.
