= Soren Pirjanian =

Iranian Armenian boxer

Personal information
- Born: 1935 (age 90–91) Tehran

Sport
- Sport: Boxing
Medal record
Representing Iran
Men's boxing
Asian Games
Silver medal – second place	1958 Tokyo	67 kg

Soren Pirjanian also spelled Souren Pirjanian (Armenian: Սուրէն Փիրջանեան; Persian: سورن پیرجانیان , born 1935) was an Iranian Armenian boxer who became a member of Iran senior national Boxing team in 1955, and was also a member of Tehran Taj Club. He participated as a member of the Iranian boxers at the 1958 Asian Games, in the Welterweight division. In Tokyo 1958, Pirjanian reached the final of the Welterweight division after defeating both Norberto David from the Philippines, and Toshiro Onuki from Japan, on points, and eventually won the silver medal of the 67 kg boxing division, after losing on points to Kim Ki-soo from South Korea in the final. He retired from championship boxing and the Iranian national boxing team, after returning from the 1958 Asian Games.
