= Christian Christensen (artist) =

Norwegian artist

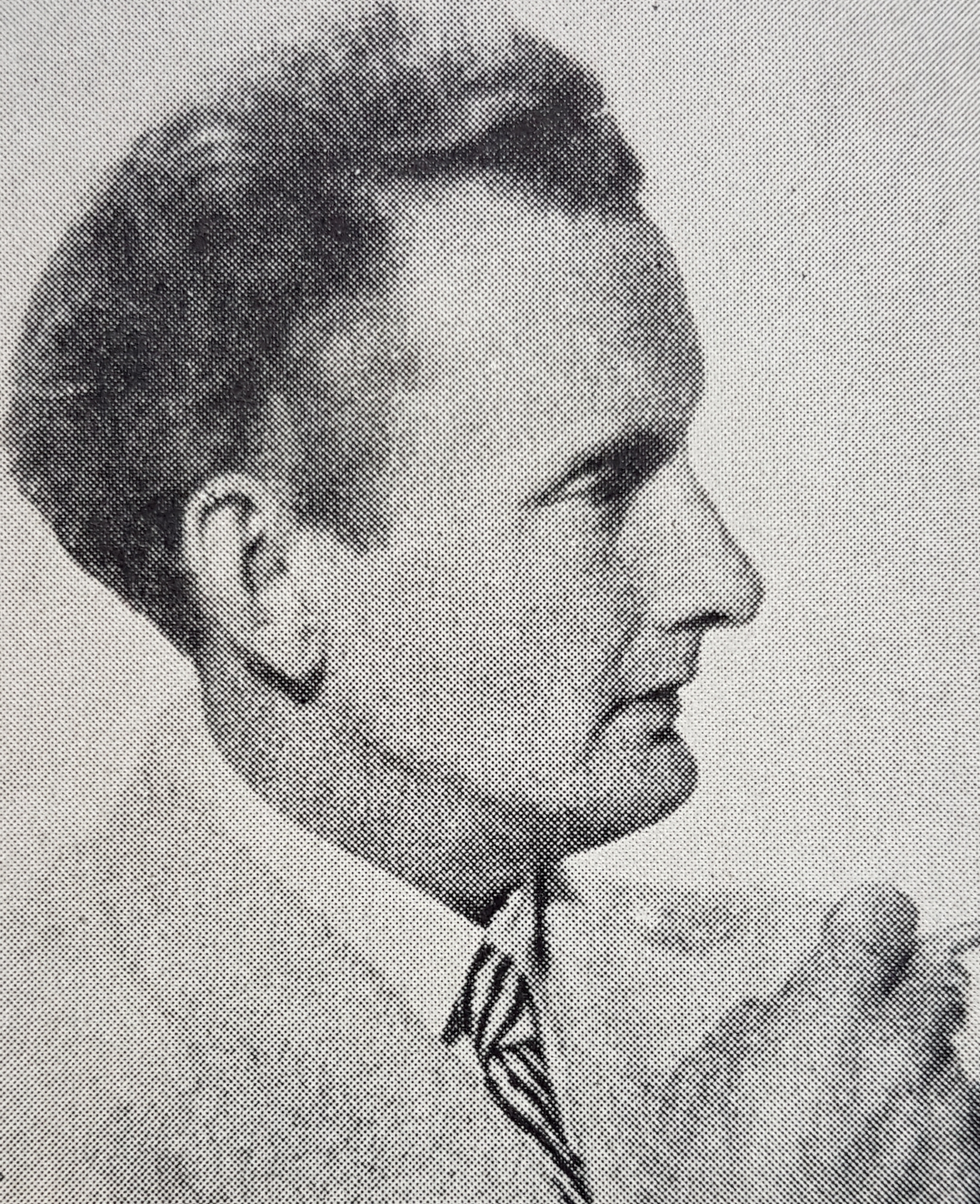
Portrait of Christian Christensen

Christian Christensen (1898–1977) was a Norwegian artist.

He was born in Århus, and was a brother of Arent Christensen. His main styles were city and landscape portraits. He is represented in the National Gallery of Norway.
