= Hermann Schneider (boxer) =

Swiss boxer

Personal information
- Nationality: Swiss
- Born: 1921

Sport
- Sport: Boxing

Hermann Schneider (born 1921) was a Swiss boxer. He competed in the men's middleweight event at the 1948 Summer Olympics.
