= Larry Carney =

American writer

Larry Carney (born December 31, 1965, in Lapeer, Michigan) is a US children’s book author and song lyricist. Most frequently writing in verse, he has created several book series which have been published by PC Treasures, Inc. Among these are the Night Before Christmas… books, which feature the Christmas Eve adventures of traditional fairy tale characters, The Silly Series, the Look! Book series, which focuses on imaginative play, and several bible story adaptations and Christian-themed children's books such as the Tiny Angels and My Own Prayers titles. As an audio book producer/director, Carney has worked with such performers as UK actor Nigel Lambert and US theater veteran David DuChene.

As a lyricist, Carney's written nearly 690 children's songs, all recorded and released on the PC Treasures PCT Music label; the majority of the songs have been composed in collaboration with Nashville performers Wade Hooker, Melissa Cusick Hooker and DB Harris. In March 2011, PC Treasures, Inc. announced the Q3 release of Monster Kid Music, an album of horror-and-monster-movie-themed songs aimed at tweens with lyrics by Carney and music composed and performed by Wade and Melissa Hooker.

In late-summer of 2011, Carney released his first independently published books, Awful Little Things and The Fields of Ibaraki. Initially launched as an Amazon Kindle-exclusive eBook, both titles were subsequently released into major eBook distribution channels in mid-September 2011, becoming available in the iBookstore, Barnes & Noble's Nook catalog, and via the Kobo eReader.

== Partial bibliography ==
General Fiction and Poetry

- Awful Little Things (2011)
- The Fields of Ibaraki (2011)

Children's Books

- Freddie Bear's Great Big Sunny Day (2011)
- Freddie Bear Chases a Rainbow (2011)
- Freddie Bear Plants a Garden (2011)
- Tiny Angels: Being Good (2010)
- Tiny Angels: Helping (2010)
- Tiny Angels: Playing (2010)
- Tiny Angels: Sharing (2010)
- My Own Prayers: I'm Not Afraid (2010)
- My Own Prayers: My Family (2010)
- My Own Prayers: Growing and Learning (2010)
- My Own Prayers: Being a Good Christian (2010)
- In the Beginning (2010)
- The Story of Adam and Eve (2010)
- The Birth of Jesus (2010)
- The Miracles of Jesus (2010)
- The Silly Zoo (2008)
- The Silly Farm (2008)
- The Silly Sea (2008)
- Silly Town (2008)
- Look! I'm a Firefighter! (2008)
- Look! I'm a Rock Star! (2008)
- Look! I'm a Pirate! (2008)
- The Night Before the Three Pigs' Christmas (2008)
- The Night Before the Little Mermaid's Christmas (2008)
- The Night Before the Three Bears' Christmas (2007)
- The Night Before the Gingerbread Man's Christmas (2007)
