= Gilbert Lavoine =

French boxer

Gilbert Lavoine (1921–1965) was a French boxer.
