= Brian Curvis =

Welsh boxer

Brian Nancurvis
- Curvis wearing one of his Lonsdale Belts in 1964

Personal information
- Nationality: British (Welsh)
- Born: 14 August 1937 Swansea, Wales
- Died: 9 January 2012 (aged 74)
- Weight: Welterweight

Boxing career
- Stance: Southpaw

Boxing record
- Total fights: 41
- Wins: 37
- Win by KO: 22
- Losses: 4
- Draws: 0
- No contests: 0
Medal record
Boxing
Representing England
British Empire & Commonwealth Games
Bronze medal – third place	1958 Cardiff	-67 kg

Brian Nancurvis (14 August 1937 – 9 January 2012), who fought under the name Brian Curvis as a professional, was a boxer from Swansea, Wales who was active from 1959 to 1966. He fought as a Welterweight, becoming British welterweight champion in 1960. He retired as undefeated champion and is the only welterweight to have won two Lonsdale Belts outright. The four defeats in his professional career were all to foreign boxers; he was never beaten by a British boxer.

== Amateur career ==
Curvis was the fourth son of Dai Nancurvis, who had been a bantamweight fighter in the British Army, and had opened a gym in Swansea on leaving the forces. All of Curvis' brothers were fighters, most notably Cliff Curvis who became British and Commonwealth welterweight champion. He began his amateur career during his National Service and while representing the army Curvis won the A.B.A. welterweight title.

In 1958, while still an amateur in the Armed Forces, he was selected to represent the England team during the boxing tournament at the 1958 British Empire and Commonwealth Games, which that year was held in Cardiff, Wales. Fighting under his birth name of Brian Nancurvis he was beaten in the semi-finals securing a bronze medal.

== Professional career ==
He had his first professional fight on 2 June 1959 at the Empire Pool, Wembley, winning by technical knockout against Harry Haydock.

He won all of his first thirteen fights, and then fought the Australian, George Barnes for the Commonwealth welterweight title that he held. The fight was held at the Vetch Field, Swansea in May 1960, and Curvis won on points over fifteen rounds.

Three fights later in November 1960, he fought Wally Swift holder of the British welterweight title, at the same time defending his own Commonwealth title. The fight was in Nottingham, and Curvis continued his winning run by taking a fifteen-round points decision.

In May 1961, he had a re-match with Swift in Nottingham for the two titles, and again won on points.

In October 1961, he defended both titles against Mick Leahy at the old Empire Pool, winning by a knockout in the eighth round.

In February 1962, he defended his titles against Tony Mancini at the Royal Albert Hall, winning by a technical knockout in the fifth round.

In his next fight, his twenty-fourth, Curvis suffered his first defeat, losing to the American, Guy Sumlin by a technical knockout in the eighth round. However he gained revenge over Sumlin with a points victory two fights later.

In February 1963, he defended his titles against Tony Smith, at the Royal Albert Hall, scoring a technical knockout in the ninth round.

In July 1964, he defended his titles against Johnny Cook, at Porthcawl, and won by a technical knockout in the fifth round.

== World title attempt ==
In September 1964, Curvis, who had only been beaten once, fought the WBA and WBC, world welterweight champion, American, Emile Griffith, for his title. The fight was held at the Empire Pool, Wembley. Although it went the full distance, Curvis was knocked down in the sixth, tenth and thirteenth rounds by body punches, and lost a unanimous points decision.

== Remaining career ==
Curvis continued to fight, suffering a defeat against Willie Ludick in Johannesburg

In November 1965, he defended his British and Commonwealth titles for the sixth time, against the Scot, Sammy McSpadden in Cardiff, winning by a technical knockout in the twelfth round.

In April 1966, he challenged for the vacant European welterweight title, fighting the Frenchman, Jean Josselin in the Palais des Sports, Paris. He was forced to retire in the fourteenth round.

Curvis fought one more fight, defeating Des Rea in Carmarthen in September 1966, before retiring from the ring as undefeated British and Commonwealth welterweight champion. For his six successful title defences he won two Lonsdale Belts outright, the only welterweight to do so.

In 1960, he was named as BBC Wales Sports Personality of the Year.

== See also ==
- List of British welterweight boxing champions
