= Jan Schubart =

Dutch boxer

Personal information
- Nationality: Dutch
- Born: 26 February 1924; Groningen, Netherlands
- Died: 10 May 2010 (aged 86); Delfzijl, Netherlands

Sport
- Sport: Boxing

Jan Schubart (26 February 1924 – 10 May 2010) was a Dutch boxer. He competed in the men's middleweight event at the 1948 Summer Olympics.
