= Wally Thom =

English boxer (1926–1980)

Personal information
- Nationality: English
- Born: Walter Thom; 14 June 1926 Birkenhead, England
- Died: 1980 (aged 53)
- Weight: welter/middleweight

Boxing career

Boxing record
- Total fights: 54
- Wins: 42 (KO 19)
- Losses: 11 (KO 7)
- Draws: 1

Wally Thom (14 June 1926 – 1980) born in Birkenhead, Merseyside an English amateur middleweight and professional welter/middleweight boxer of the 1940s, and 1950s, and referee of the 1950s, 1960s, and 1970s, who as an amateur was runner-up for the 1945 Amateur Boxing Association of England (ABAE) middleweight title, against Randolph Turpin (Leamington Spa ABC ), boxing out of Army ABC, was runner-up for the 1949 Amateur Boxing Association of England (ABAE) middleweight title, against Alan Buxton (Harrow ABC), boxing out of Birkenhead ABC, and won a silver medal at middleweight in the 1947 European Amateur Boxing Championships in Dublin, Ireland, losing to gold medal winner Aimé-Joseph Escudie of France, and as a professional won the British Boxing Board of Control (BBBofC) Central Area welterweight title, BBBofC British welterweight title, European Boxing Union (EBU) welterweight title, and British Empire welterweight title (twice), his professional fighting weight varied from 145 1/4 lb (65.9 kg; 10 st 5.3 lb), i.e. welterweight to 154 lb (70 kg; 11 st 0 lb), i.e. middleweight. Wally Thom was managed by Johnny Campbell (circa-1905 – 2 May 1994 (aged 89)).
