= Jim Oliver (novelist) =

American novelist

Jim Oliver is an American novelist. His first book was Closing Distance (ISBN 1-55583-376-4), published in 1992, and his second Wings in the Snow (ISBN 1-55583-462-0), published in 1998. He lives in Hawaii.

Oliver served in the Philippines in the Peace Corps from 1962 to 1964.

Oliver's books center around the ambiguities of gay urban life at the end of the 20th century. His characters are men who are torn by issues of their own sexuality and at the same time are committed to their families of origin, friends, lovers, and the community at large.
