= Jeannot Welter =

Luxembourgish boxer

Personal information
- Nationality: Luxembourgish
- Born: 15 March 1928; Ottange, France
- Died: 22 December 1998 (aged 70); Esch-sur-Alzette, Luxembourg

Sport
- Sport: Boxing

Jeannot Welter (15 March 1928 – 22 December 1998) was a Luxembourgish boxer. He competed at the 1948 Summer Olympics and the 1952 Summer Olympics.
