= Wally Swift =

Personal information
- Nationality: British
- Born: 10 August 1936 Nottingham, England
- Died: 10 November 2012 (aged 76) Birmingham, England
- Weight: Welterweight, super welterweight, middleweight

Boxing career

Boxing record
- Total fights: 88
- Wins: 68
- Win by KO: 13
- Losses: 17
- Draws: 3

Wally Swift (10 August 1936 – 10 November 2012) was a British boxer who won the British welterweight title in 1960 and twice fought for the Commonwealth title before moving up to middleweight, becoming British champion between 1964 and 1965. He went on to fight for the European super welterweight and middleweight titles and the British and Commonwealth middleweight titles.

== Career ==
Born in Nottingham and raised in a Bilborough council house along with seven siblings, Wally Swift took up boxing at the age of 10 and won three schoolboy titles. He joined the British Army where he became a PT Instructor and continued to box. He began his professional career in 1957 and won his first nine fights, while also working at Raleigh's factory in the city. He won his first title in September 1959 when he stopped Ray Corbett in the sixth round to take the Midlands Area welterweight title. In February 1960 he beat Tommy Molloy to take the British welterweight title, but lost it nine months later to Brian Curvis with the Commonwealth title also at stake. He challenged Curvis for both titles in May 1961 but again lost on points.

Moving up to middleweight he won the Midlands Area title in October 1962 with a points victory over Maxie Smith. He lost the title the following year, but a run of eleven fights in which he was only beaten once set him up to challenge for Mick Leahy's British middleweight title; Swift took a points decision in December 1964 to become British champion at a second weight. He lost the title in his first defence in November 1965 when he was stopped in the twelfth round by Johnny Pritchett due to an eye injury. Swift beat Peter Sharpe in May 1966 in an eliminator to face Pritchett, winning on points. In February 1967 he faced Pritchett at the Nottingham Ice Stadium for the title, losing on points over fifteen rounds.

In September 1967 Swift faced Sandro Mazzinghi for the European super welterweight title in Milan; The fight was stopped in the sixth round due to injuries to Swift.

In March 1968 Swift challenged Juan Carlos Duran for the European middleweight title. Swift lost the fight after being disqualified in the tenth round for butting.

Swift's final fight came in July 1969 when he met Les McAteer for the vacant British and Commonwealth middleweight titles. A cut to Swift's left eye forced him to retire in the eleventh round. In his career he had 88 fights, winning 68.

After retiring from boxing Swift became a bookmaker but retired after injuring his back in a fall from a ladder; He went on to become a trainer, manager, and promoter, working with fighters such as former British champions Del Bryan and Roy Smith, as well as his two sons Wally Jr, who became British light-middleweight champion, and Tony, who fought for the Commonwealth welterweight title.

Wally Swift died at Heartlands Hospital in Birmingham on 10 November 2012 after being taken ill with a chest infection. He was 76. His funeral was held at Knowle Parish Church.
