= Tongchai Teptani =

Thai boxer

Personal information
- Nationality: Thai
- Born: 11 June 1936 (age 89); Samut Sakhon, Thailand

Sport
- Sport: Boxing

Tongchai Teptani (born 11 June 1936) is a Thai boxer. He competed in the men's welterweight event at the 1960 Summer Olympics. At the 1960 Summer Olympics in Rome, he lost to Andrés Navarro of Spain in the Round of 32 after receiving a bye in the Round of 64.
