= Jimmy Oliver =

Jimmy Oliver may refer to:

- Jimmy Oliver (basketball) (born 1969), American basketball player
- Jimmy Oliver (Canadian football) (born 1973), American football player in the CFL
- Jimmy Oliver (musician) (1920–2005), American musician

== See also ==
- James Oliver (disambiguation)
