= Johnny Wright (boxer) =

British boxer (1929–2001)

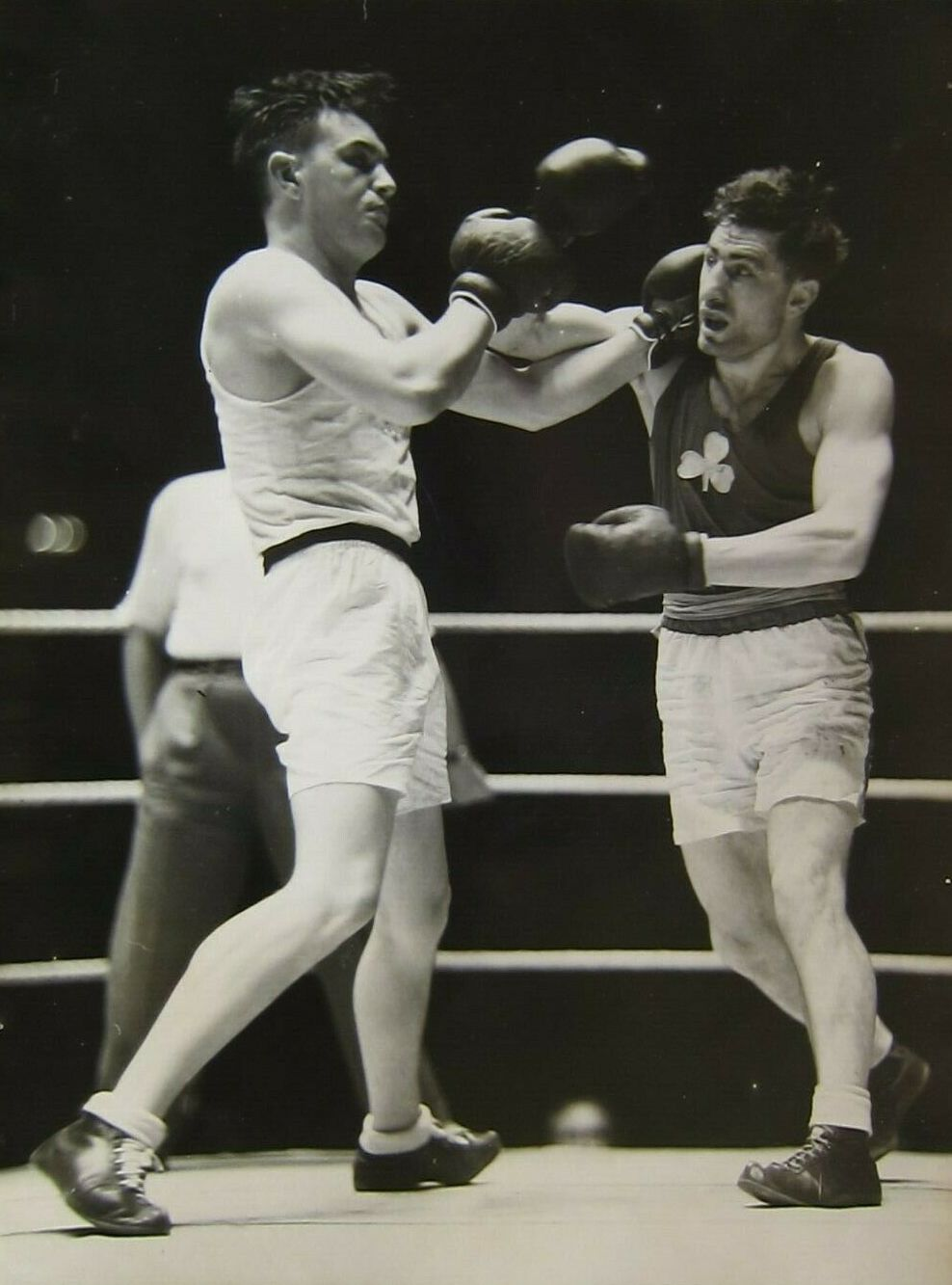
- Wright vs Irish Mick McKeon, 1948 Olympic Semi-final

Personal information
- Nationality: British (English)
- Born: 19 May 1929 Camden, London, England
- Died: 12 July 2001 (aged 72) Blandford, Dorset, England

Sport
- Sport: boxing
Medal record
Representing Great Britain
Men's Boxing
Silver medal – second place	1948 London	Middleweight

John Alan Wright (19 May 1929 – 12 July 2001) was a British amateur boxer who won a silver medal in the 1948 Summer Olympics in London. He lost in the final to László Papp of Hungary. He was born in London and fought as Johnny Wright.

== Biography ==
Wright won the 1948 Amateur Boxing Association British middleweight title, when boxing for the Royal Navy.

=== 1948 Olympic results ===
Below are the results of Johnny Wright of Great Britain, a middleweight boxer who competed at the 1948 Olympic Games in London.

- Round of 32: defeated Herman Schneider (Switzerland) on points
- Round of 16: defeated Hector Garcia (Argentina) referee stopped contest in second round
- Quarterfinal: defeated Jan Schubart (Netherlands) on points
- Semifinal: defeated Mick McKeon (Ireland) on points
- Final: lost to László Papp (Hungary) on points (was awarded the silver medal)
