= Auguste Cavignac =

Belgian boxer (1928–1951)

Personal information
- Nationality: Belgian
- Born: 20 May 1928; Marchienne-au-Pont, Belgium
- Died: 21 February 1951 (aged 22); Marchienne-au-Pont, Belgium

Sport
- Sport: Boxing

Auguste Cavignac (20 May 1928 – 21 February 1951) was a Belgian boxer. He competed in the men's middleweight event at the 1948 Summer Olympics.
