= Yoland Levèque =

French boxer

Personal information
- Nationality: French
- Born: 17 April 1937 Mont-Saint-Quentin, Somme, France
- Died: 28 October 2011 (aged 74)
- Weight: Middleweight

Boxing career

Yoland Levèque (17 April 1937 – 28 October 2011) was a French professional boxer who competed from 1960 to 1970 and held the European super-welterweight title in 1966. As an amateur, he competed in the middleweight event at the 1960 Summer Olympics in Rome. He lost his opening bout to Yevgeny Feofanov of the Soviet Union.
