= James Edward Oliver =

American mathematician

- Born: July 27, 1829; Portland, Maine
- Died: March 27, 1895 (aged 65)
- Education: Harvard University
- Scientific career
- Fields: Mathematics
- Workplaces: Cornell University

James Edward Oliver (1829-1895) was an American mathematician known for his role in establishing the mathematics department at Cornell University.

Born in Portland, Maine, Oliver graduated from Harvard College in 1849 and was immediately appointed assistant in the office of the American Nautical Almanac in Cambridge. Two decades would elapse before, in 1871, he became assistant professor of mathematics at Cornell, and two years later was appointed as full professor.

Oliver chaired the Department of Mathematics at Cornell from 1871 until his death. He founded the Social Science Club and was a member of the University Ethical Association. He was known to play an important role in local politics and society, for example, introducing Susan B. Anthony at the Tompkins County Political Equality Convention in 1894. In a similar vein, he taught a popular class in ethics at the Unitarian Church in Ithaca.

Oliver was an elected member of the American Academy of Arts and Sciences, the American Philosophical Society and the National Academy of Sciences. He published "A Treatise on Trigonometry" in 1886.

Oliver was fond of applying mathematics to then-unusual subjects. He attempted the formulation of economic laws as algebraic formulas and, at Cornell, founded a seminar in economics. Although he was not the first to make such attempts, his particular goal was to define the relation between economics and probability theory.

He died in 1895 after a ten-week battle with serious illness. In a published tribute, noted geometer G. B. Halsted ranked Oliver as a mathematical genius, "one of the most remarkable America has produced," but noted that he seemed to have no ambition to publish "an adequate record of his mental life. In personal character he resembled Lobachevsky, whom he intensely admired."
