= Moustafa Fahim =

Egyptian boxer (1925–2010)

Personal information
- Nationality: Egyptian
- Born: 10 July 1925
- Died: 29 April 2010 (aged 84)

Sport
- Sport: Boxing

Moustafa Fahim (10 July 1925 – 29 April 2010) was an Egyptian boxer. He competed at the 1948 Summer Olympics and the 1952 Summer Olympics.
