= Ivano Fontana =

Italian boxer (1926–1993)

Olympic medal record

Men's Boxing
Bronze medal – third place	1948 London	Middleweight

Ivano Fontana (25 November 1926 – 24 December 1993) was an Italian boxer. He won a bronze medal in the middleweight division at the 1948 Summer Olympics in London, losing to gold medal winner Laszlo Papp. He was born in Lucca, Italy.

== 1948 Olympic record ==
- Round of 32: bye
- Round of 16: defeated John Nuttall (India) on points
- Quarterfinal: defeated Dogomar Martinez (Uruguay) on points
- Semifinal: lost to Laszlo Papp (Hungary) on points
- Bronze Medal Bout: won by walkover versus Mick McKeon (Ireland); was awarded bronze medal

== Professional career ==
Fontana turned professional in 1950 and fought mainly in his native Italy. In 1952, he won the vacant Italian middleweight title with a win over Gino Campagna. In 1955, he won the Italian light heavyweight title with a win over Lorenzo Rocci.
