= George Aldridge (boxer) =

English boxer

Personal information
- Nationality: British
- Born: 1 February 1936 (age 90) London, England
- Weight: Middleweight

Boxing career

Boxing record
- Total fights: 52
- Wins: 36
- Win by KO: 17
- Losses: 14
- Draws: 2

George Aldridge (born 1 February 1936) is a former middleweight boxer who was British champion from 1962 to 1963 and fought for the European title in 1963.

== Career ==
Born in London, Aldridge was raised in Market Harborough in Leicestershire after his family were evacuated during World War II; There he joined the Market Harborough Amateur Boxing Club, and made his professional debut in October 1956 with a draw against Paddy Delargy. A string of wins in 1957 led to a fight for the Midlands Area title in February 1958, which he won by a points decision over Les Allen. In July 1962 he fought Pat O'Grady for the vacant Southern Area title, winning on points over ten rounds. In November that year he beat John McCormack by a sixth-round knockout to become British champion, setting up a challenge for the European title against László Papp in Vienna in February 1963, which he lost by TKO in the fifteenth and final round. He defended his British title in May against Mick Leahy, losing by a first-round TKO after 1 minute 45 seconds. After two fights in December 1963 he retired from boxing.

Between 1973 and 1988 Aldridge ran The Talbot pub in Market Harborough.
