= Aimé-Joseph Escudie =

French boxer

Personal information
- Nationality: French
- Born: 28 May 1927; Béziers, France
- Died: 24 November 2015 (aged 88); Béziers, France

Sport
- Sport: Boxing

Aimé-Joseph Raymond Escudie (28 May 1927 – 24 November 2015) was a French boxer. He competed in the men's middleweight event at the 1948 Summer Olympics.
