= Martin Hansen (boxer) =

Danish boxer

Personal information
- Nationality: Danish
- Born: 17 July 1925 Liverpool, England
- Died: 18 June 1999 (aged 73) Copenhagen, Denmark

Sport
- Sport: Boxing

Martin Hansen (17 July 1925 – 18 June 1999) was a Danish boxer. He competed in the men's middleweight event at the 1948 Summer Olympics.
