= Iran at the 1958 Asian Games =

- IOC code: IRN
- NOC: National Olympic Committee of the Islamic Republic of Iran

in Tokyo
- Competitors: 79 in 11 sports
- Flag bearer: Mahmoud Namjoo
- Medals Ranked 4th: Gold 7 Silver 14 Bronze 11 Total 32

Asian Games appearances (overview)
- 1951; 1954; 1958; 1962; 1966; 1970; 1974; 1978; 1982; 1986; 1990; 1994; 1998; 2002; 2006; 2010; 2014; 2018; 2022; 2026

Iran participated in the 1958 Asian Games held in the capital city of Tokyo, Japan. This country is ranked 4th with 7 gold medals in this edition of the Asiad.

== Competitors ==
Sport	Men	Women	Total
Athletics	8	2	10
Boxing	9		9
Cycling	1		1
Diving	2		2
Football	17		17
Shooting	3		3
Swimming	3		3
Table tennis	4	2	6
Tennis	4		4
Volleyball	8		8
Weightlifting	8		8
Wrestling	8		8
Total	75	4	79

== Medal summary ==
=== Medals by sport ===
Sport	Gold	Silver	Bronze	Total
Athletics	1	1	2	4
Boxing	0	3	3	6
Cycling track	0	2	0	2
Diving	0	0	2	2
Table tennis	0	0	1	1
Volleyball	0	1	0	1
Weightlifting	3	4	1	8
Wrestling	3	3	2	8
Total	7	14	11	32

=== Medalists ===
Medal	Name	Sport	Event
Gold	Mahmoud Khaligh Razavi	Athletics	Men's 1500 m
Gold	Jalal Mansouri	Weightlifting	Men's 82.5 kg
Gold	Hassan Rahnavardi	Weightlifting	Men's 90 kg
Gold	Firouz Pojhan	Weightlifting	Men's +90 kg
Gold	Emam-Ali Habibi	Wrestling	Men's freestyle 67 kg
Gold	Gholamreza Takhti	Wrestling	Men's freestyle 87 kg
Gold	Abbas Zandi	Wrestling	Men's freestyle +87 kg
Silver	Mahmoud Khaligh Razavi	Athletics	Men's 800 m
Silver	Vazik Kazarian	Boxing	Men's 63.5 kg
Silver	Soren Pirjanian	Boxing	Men's 67 kg
Silver	Ghasem Amiryavari	Boxing	Men's 71 kg
Silver	Jafar Goltalab	Cycling track	Men's sprint
Silver	Jafar Goltalab	Cycling track	Men's 1 km time trial
Silver	Mahmoud Adl; Mohammad Sharifzadeh; Abbas Tehrani; Abdolmonem Kamal; Siavash Farrokhi; Hossein Ali Amiri; Kamal Pourhashemi; Mohammad Esmaeil Ashtari	Volleyball	Men
Silver	Esmaeil Elmkhah	Weightlifting	Men's 52 kg
Silver	Mahmoud Namjoo	Weightlifting	Men's 56 kg
Silver	Ali Safa-Sonboli	Weightlifting	Men's 60 kg
Silver	Ebrahim Peiravi	Weightlifting	Men's 75 kg
Silver	Khalil Rayatpanah	Wrestling	Men's freestyle 52 kg
Silver	Tofigh Jahanbakht	Wrestling	Men's freestyle 73 kg
Silver	Nabi Sorouri	Wrestling	Men's freestyle 79 kg
Bronze	Ali Baghbanbashi	Athletics	Men's 5000 m
Bronze	Ali Baghbanbashi	Athletics	Men's 10,000 m
Bronze	Ezaria Ilkhanoff	Boxing	Men's 51 kg
Bronze	Leon Khachatourian	Boxing	Men's 75 kg
Bronze	Akbar Khojini	Boxing	Men's 81 kg
Bronze	Manouchehr Fasihi	Diving	Men's 3 m springboard
Bronze	Hassan Azami	Diving	Men's 10 m platform
Bronze	Edmond Beitkhoda; Houshang Bozorgzadeh; Amir Ehteshamzadeh; Hamid Korloo	Table tennis	Men's team
Bronze	Henrik Tamraz	Weightlifting	Men's 67.5 kg
Bronze	Gholam Hossein Zandi	Wrestling	Men's freestyle 57 kg
Bronze	Nasser Givehchi	Wrestling	Men's freestyle 62 kg

== Results by event ==
=== Aquatics ===
==== Diving ====
Athlete	Event	Score	Rank
Manouchehr Fasihi	Men's 3 m springboard	112.74	3rd place, bronze medalist(s)
Hassan Azami	Men's 10 m platform	104.45	3rd place, bronze medalist(s)

==== Swimming ====
Athlete	Event	Heats		Final	
Athlete	Event	Time	Rank	Time	Rank
Mousa Boroumand	Men's 100 m freestyle	1:04.1	7 Q	1:04.3	7
Mansour Emadi	Men's 100 m backstroke	—N/a		1:14.8	7
Tofigh Yousefzadeh	Men's 200 m breaststroke	3:04.2	10	Did not advance	

=== Boxing ===
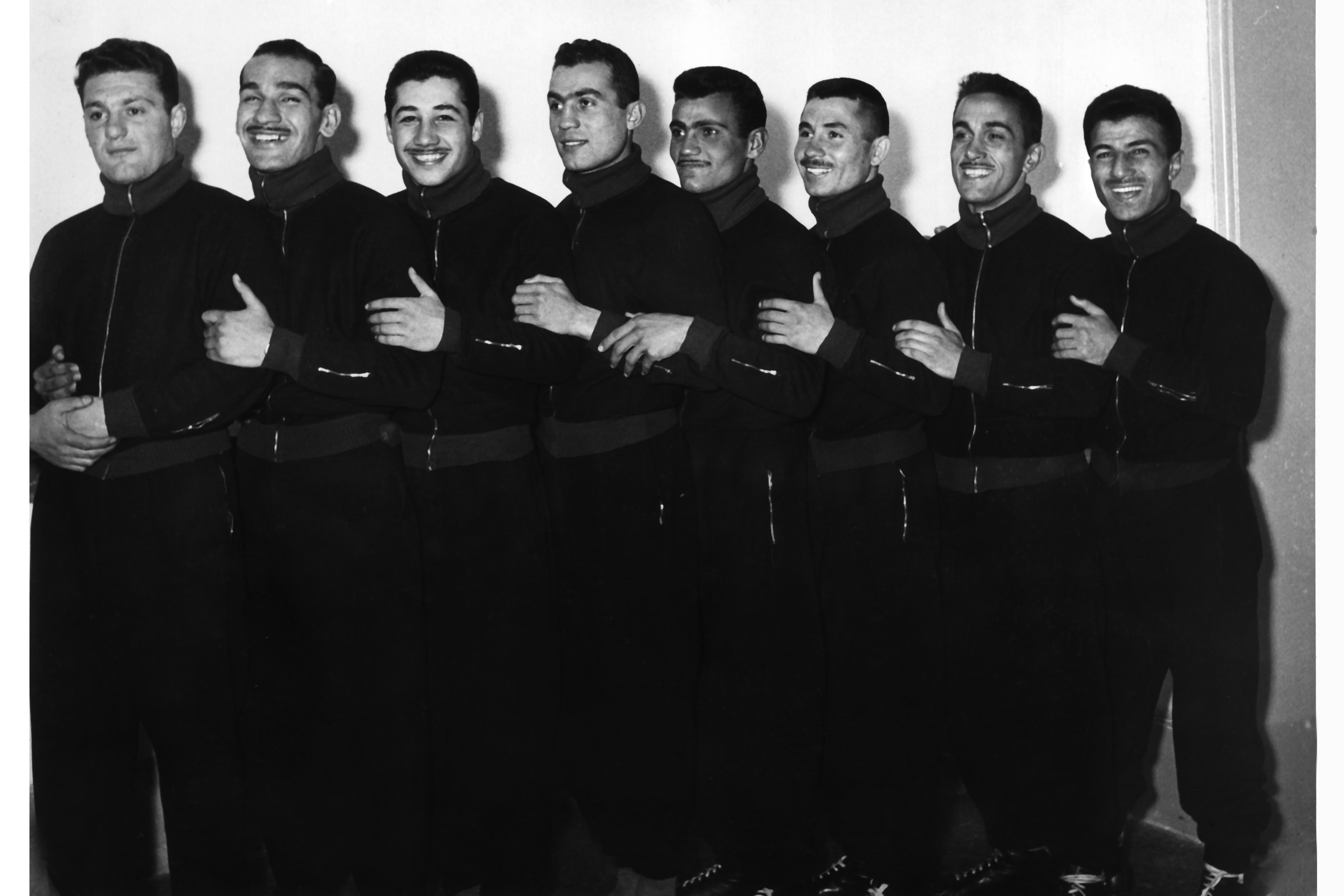
The boxing team

Athlete	Event	Round of 16	Quarterfinal	Semifinal	Final	Rank
Ezaria Ilkhanoff	Men's 51 kg	—N/a	Bonus (PHI); W Points	Hla (BIR); L Points	Did not advance	3rd place, bronze medalist(s)
Karapet Kochar	Men's 54 kg	Bye	Suzuki (JPN); L Points	Did not advance		5
Sadegh Aliakbarzadeh	Men's 57 kg	Bye	Ikeyama (JPN); L Points	Did not advance		5
Hassan Pakandam	Men's 60 kg	—N/a	Chung (KOR); L Points	Did not advance		5
Vazik Kazarian	Men's 63.5 kg	—N/a	Bye	Chundakowsolaya (THA); W Points	Kawakami (JPN); L Points	2nd place, silver medalist(s)
Soren Pirjanian	Men's 67 kg	—N/a	David (PHI); W Points	Onuki (JPN); W Points	Kim (KOR); L Points	2nd place, silver medalist(s)
Ghasem Amiryavari	Men's 71 kg	—N/a	Bye	Hussain (PAK); W Points	Takahashi (JPN); L Points	2nd place, silver medalist(s)
Leon Khachatourian	Men's 75 kg	—N/a		Thapa (IND); L Points	Did not advance	3rd place, bronze medalist(s)
Akbar Khojini	Men's 81 kg	—N/a		Mahmood (PAK); L Points	Did not advance	3rd place, bronze medalist(s)

=== Cycling ===
==== Road ====
Athlete	Event	Time	Rank
Jafar Goltalab	Men's road race	Did not finish	—

=== Football ===
Men

Squad list	Preliminary round		Quarterfinal	Semifinal	Final	Rank
Squad list	Group D	Rank	Quarterfinal	Semifinal	Final	Rank
Nader Afshar Alavinejad; Davoud Arghavani; Mahmoud Bayati; Mohammad Bayati; Javad Beheshti; Masoud Boroumand; Parviz Dehdari; Amir Eraghi; Iraj Erfan; Aref Gholizadeh; Nasser Haji Mokhtar; Mohsen Haji Nasrollah; Iraj Hatam; Davoud Heidari; Ali Jafarzadeh; Parviz Kouzehkanani; Jafar Namdar; Coach: Hossein Sadaghiani	Israel; L 0–4	4	Did not advance			14
Nader Afshar Alavinejad; Davoud Arghavani; Mahmoud Bayati; Mohammad Bayati; Javad Beheshti; Masoud Boroumand; Parviz Dehdari; Amir Eraghi; Iraj Erfan; Aref Gholizadeh; Nasser Haji Mokhtar; Mohsen Haji Nasrollah; Iraj Hatam; Davoud Heidari; Ali Jafarzadeh; Parviz Kouzehkanani; Jafar Namdar; Coach: Hossein Sadaghiani	South Korea; L 0–5	4	Did not advance			14

=== Table tennis ===
Individual

Athlete	Event	Round of 32	Round of 16	Quarterfinal	Semifinal	Final	Rank
Edmond Beitkhoda	Men's singles	Lê (VNM); L 0–3	Did not advance				17
Houshang Bozorgzadeh	Men's singles	Li (HKG); W 3–0	Ybanez (PHI); W 3–0	Ogimura (JPN); L 0–3	Did not advance		5
Amir Ehteshamzadeh	Men's singles	Narita (JPN); L 1–3	Did not advance				17
Hamid Korloo	Men's singles	Trần (VNM); L 2–3	Did not advance				17
Amir Ehteshamzadeh; Houshang Bozorgzadeh	Men's doubles	—N/a	Tsunoda and Narita (JPN); L 2–3	Did not advance			9
Hamid Korloo; Edmond Beitkhoda	Men's doubles	—N/a	Li and Sou (ROC); L 0–3	Did not advance			9
Atieh Derakhshan	Women's singles	Park (KOR); W 3–1	Eguchi (JPN); L 0–3	Did not advance			9
Azam Khatib	Women's singles	Chiang (ROC); L 0–3	Did not advance				17
Azam Khatib; Atieh Derakhshan	Women's doubles	—N/a	Park and Cho (KOR); L 0–3	Did not advance			9
Edmond Beitkhoda; Atieh Derakhshan	Mixed doubles	Kim and Park (KOR); W 3–1	Tsunoda and Namba (JPN); L 0–3	Did not advance			9
Houshang Bozorgzadeh; Azam Khatib	Mixed doubles	Hsieh and Chiang (ROC); L 1–3	Did not advance				17

Team

Athlete	Event	Round robin							Rank
Athlete	Event	Round 1	Round 2	Round 3	Round 4	Round 5	Round 6	Tiebreaker	Rank
Edmond Beitkhoda; Houshang Bozorgzadeh; Amir Ehteshamzadeh; Hamid Korloo	Men's team	Hong Kong; W 5–1	Republic of China; L 3–5	South Vietnam; L 2–5	Japan; L 2–5	South Korea; W 5–3	Philippines; W 5–1	Republic of China; W 5–3	3rd place, bronze medalist(s)
Atieh Derakhshan; Azam Khatib	Women's team	Republic of China; L 0–3	Japan; L 0–3	South Korea; L 0–3	Hong Kong; L 0–3	—N/a			5

=== Tennis ===
Athlete	Event	Round of 64	Round of 32	Round of 16	Quarterfinal	Semifinal	Final	Rank
George Aftandilian	Men's singles	Bye	Pinto (CEY); L 0–2 (2–6, 2–6)	Did not advance				17
Enoud Jasemzadeh	Men's singles	Ishiguro (JPN); L 0–2 (0–6, 2–6)	Did not advance					33
Henry Johanes	Men's singles	Dungo (PHI); L 0–2 (1–6, 2–6)	Did not advance					33
Arsham Yasaei	Men's singles	Bye	Tsai (HKG); L 1–2 (9–7, 2–6, 1–6)	Did not advance				17
George Aftandilian; Enoud Jasemzadeh	Men's doubles	—N/a	Lim and Pakir (SIN); L 1–2 (9–7, 4–6, 0–6)	Did not advance				17
Henry Johanes; Arsham Yasaei	Men's doubles	—N/a	Võ and Võ (VNM); L 1–2 (9–7, 4–6, 2–6)	Did not advance				17

=== Volleyball ===
Team	Event	Round robin				Rank
Team	Event	Round 1	Round 2	Round 3	Round 4	Rank
Iran	Men	Philippines; W 3–2 (15–12, 13–15, 8–15, 15–13, 15–2)	India; W 3–1 (16–14, 15–11, 9–15, 15–8)	Hong Kong; W 3–0 (15–9, 15–9, 15–6)	Japan; L 0–3 (17–19, 12–15, 8–15)	2nd place, silver medalist(s)
Roster: Mahmoud Adl; Mohammad Sharifzadeh; Abbas Tehrani; Abdolmonem Kamal; Siavash Farrokhi; Hossein Ali Amiri; Kamal Pourhashemi; Mohammad Esmaeil Ashtari; Coach: (Pakistan) Sardar Nasrullah Khan

=== Weightlifting ===
Athlete	Event	Press		Snatch		Jerk		Total	
Athlete	Event	Result	Rank	Result	Rank	Result	Rank	Result	Rank
Esmaeil Elmkhah	Men's 52 kg	87.5	1	85.0	3	105.0	5	277.5	2nd place, silver medalist(s)
Mahmoud Namjoo	Men's 56 kg	100.0	1	95.0	3	120.0	3	315.0	2nd place, silver medalist(s)
Ali Safa-Sonboli	Men's 60 kg	107.5	1	102.5	2	132.5	3	342.5	2nd place, silver medalist(s)
Henrik Tamraz	Men's 67.5 kg	112.5	3	112.5	2	145.0	4	370.0	3rd place, bronze medalist(s)
Ebrahim Peiravi	Men's 75 kg	115.0	2	117.5	1	147.5	2	380.0	2nd place, silver medalist(s)
Jalal Mansouri	Men's 82.5 kg	127.5	1	122.5	1	150.0	1	400.0	1st place, gold medalist(s)
Hassan Rahnavardi	Men's 90 kg	140.0	1	127.5	1	165.0	1	432.5	1st place, gold medalist(s)
Firouz Pojhan	Men's +90 kg	152.5	1	132.5	1	175.0	1	460.0	1st place, gold medalist(s)

=== Wrestling ===
Freestyle

Athlete	Event	Elimination round					Rank
Athlete	Event	Round 1	Round 2	Round 3	Round 4	Round 5	Rank
Khalil Rayatpanah	Men's 52 kg	Bye	Alcantara (PHI); W Fall	Yoshida (JPN); L Points	Din (PAK); W Points	—N/a	2nd place, silver medalist(s)
Gholam Hossein Zandi	Men's 57 kg	Im (KOR); W Points	Iizuka (JPN); D Points	Tumasis (PHI); W Fall	Akhtar (PAK); L Points	—N/a	3rd place, bronze medalist(s)
Nasser Givehchi	Men's 62 kg	Perez (PHI); W Fall	Din (PAK); D Points	Nakagawa (JPN); L Points	Bye	—N/a	3rd place, bronze medalist(s)
Emam-Ali Habibi	Men's 67 kg	Ashraf (PAK); W Fall	Bong (KOR); W Points	Abe (JPN); W Points	Bye	—N/a	1st place, gold medalist(s)
Tofigh Jahanbakht	Men's 73 kg	Choi (KOR); W Fall	Kaneko (JPN); D Points	Bye	Bashir (PAK); W Points	Bye	2nd place, silver medalist(s)
Nabi Sorouri	Men's 79 kg	Nagai (JPN); D Points	Rahim (AFG); W Fall	Rasool (PAK); W Points	Arcales (PHI); W Fall	—N/a	2nd place, silver medalist(s)
Gholamreza Takhti	Men's 87 kg	Naseri (AFG); W Fall	Hwang (KOR); W Fall	Ali (PAK); W Fall	Takagi (JPN); W Fall	—N/a	1st place, gold medalist(s)
Abbas Zandi	Men's +87 kg	Ohira (JPN); W Points	Nazir (PAK); D Points	Bye	—N/a		1st place, gold medalist(s)
