= Boxing at the 1958 Asian Games =

Boxing competitions

- Venue: Korakuen Ice Palace
- Dates: 28–31 May 1958
- Competitors: 63 from 11 nations

The Boxing Tournament at the 1958 Asian Games was held in Korakuen Ice Palace, Tokyo, Japan from 28 to 31 May 1958. A total of 62 boxers from 11 nations competed.

The host nation dominated the competition winning six out of ten gold medals, South Korea, Burma and Republic of China (Taiwan) won the remaining gold medals.

== Schedule ==
R	Round of 16	¼	Quarterfinals	½	Semifinals	F	Finals

Event↓/Date →	28th Wed	29th Thu	30th Fri	31st Sat
Men's 51 kg	¼		½	F
Men's 54 kg	R	¼	½	F
Men's 57 kg	R	¼	½	F
Men's 60 kg	¼		½	F
Men's 63.5 kg			½	F
Men's 67 kg		¼	½	F
Men's 71 kg	¼		½	F
Men's 75 kg		½		F
Men's 81 kg	½			F
Men's +81 kg				F

== Medalists ==
Event	Gold	Silver	Bronze
Flyweight (51 kg)	Akio Maki; Japan	Hla Nyunt; Burma	Kim Chang-han; South Korea
Flyweight (51 kg)	Akio Maki; Japan	Hla Nyunt; Burma	Ezaria Ilkhanoff; Iran
Bantamweight (54 kg)	Thein Myint; Burma	Takeo Suzuki; Japan	Muhammad Nasir; Pakistan
Bantamweight (54 kg)	Thein Myint; Burma	Takeo Suzuki; Japan	Jacinto Diaz; Philippines
Featherweight (57 kg)	Isami Ikeyama; Japan	Dionisio Guevarra; Philippines	Austin Dunsford; Singapore
Featherweight (57 kg)	Isami Ikeyama; Japan	Dionisio Guevarra; Philippines	Song Soon-chun; South Korea
Lightweight (60 kg)	Chung Dong-hoon; South Korea	Shinichiro Suzuki; Japan	Celedonio Espinosa; Philippines
Lightweight (60 kg)	Chung Dong-hoon; South Korea	Shinichiro Suzuki; Japan	Sundar Rao; India
Light welterweight (63.5 kg)	Shigemasa Kawakami; Japan	Vazik Kazarian; Iran	Sueb Chundakowsolaya; Thailand
Light welterweight (63.5 kg)	Shigemasa Kawakami; Japan	Vazik Kazarian; Iran	Kim Deuk-bong; South Korea
Welterweight (67 kg)	Kim Ki-soo; South Korea	Soren Pirjanian; Iran	Toshiro Onuki; Japan
Welterweight (67 kg)	Kim Ki-soo; South Korea	Soren Pirjanian; Iran	Tongchai Teptani; Thailand
Light middleweight (71 kg)	Osamu Takahashi; Japan	Ghasem Amiryavari; Iran	Bait Hussain; Pakistan
Light middleweight (71 kg)	Osamu Takahashi; Japan	Ghasem Amiryavari; Iran	Stanley Majid; Burma
Middleweight (75 kg)	Chang Lo-pu; Republic of China	Hari Singh Thapa; India	Shoichi Matsuura; Japan
Middleweight (75 kg)	Chang Lo-pu; Republic of China	Hari Singh Thapa; India	Leon Khachatourian; Iran
Light heavyweight (81 kg)	Shuichi Nakayama; Japan	Sultan Mahmood; Pakistan	Akbar Khojini; Iran
Light heavyweight (81 kg)	Shuichi Nakayama; Japan	Sultan Mahmood; Pakistan	None awarded
Heavyweight (+81 kg)	Shunzo Nishio; Japan	Khalid Mumtaz; Pakistan	None awarded
Heavyweight (+81 kg)	Shunzo Nishio; Japan	Khalid Mumtaz; Pakistan	None awarded

== Medal table ==
Rank	Nation	Gold	Silver	Bronze	Total
1	Japan (JPN)	6	2	2	10
2	South Korea (KOR)	2	0	3	5
3	Burma (BIR)	1	1	1	3
4	Republic of China (ROC)	1	0	0	1
5	Iran (IRN)	0	3	3	6
6	Pakistan (PAK)	0	2	2	4
7	Philippines (PHI)	0	1	2	3
8	India (IND)	0	1	1	2
9	Thailand (THA)	0	0	2	2
10	Singapore (SIN)	0	0	1	1
Totals (10 entries)		10	10	17	37

== Participating nations ==
A total of 63 athletes from 11 nations competed in boxing at the 1958 Asian Games:

- Burma (6)
- Cambodia (1)
- India (3)
- Iran (9)
- Japan (10)
- Pakistan (5)
- Philippines (6)
- Republic of China (8)
- Singapore (2)
- South Korea (7)
- Thailand (6)
