= Weightlifting at the 1958 Asian Games =

- Venue: National Stadium Gymnasium
- Dates: 25–28 May 1958
- Competitors: 60 from 11 nations

Weightlifting was contested from May 25 to May 28 at the 1958 Asian Games in Tokyo Main Stadium Gymnasium, Tokyo, Japan. The competition included only men's events for eight different weight categories.

Iran finished first at the medal table by winning three gold medals.

== Schedule ==
A	Group A

Event↓/Date →	25th Sun	26th Mon	27th Tue	28th Wed
Men's 52 kg	A			
Men's 56 kg	A			
Men's 60 kg		A		
Men's 67.5 kg		A		
Men's 75 kg			A	
Men's 82.5 kg			A	
Men's 90 kg				A
Men's +90 kg				A

== Medalists ==
Event	Gold	Silver	Bronze
Flyweight (52 kg)	Lee Jang-woo; South Korea	Esmaeil Elmkhah; Iran	Keiji Hagio; Japan
Bantamweight (56 kg)	Shigeo Kogure; Japan	Mahmoud Namjoo; Iran	Alberto Nogar; Philippines
Featherweight (60 kg)	Lee Taik-yong; South Korea	Ali Safa-Sonboli; Iran	Fumio Takeda; Japan
Lightweight (67.5 kg)	Tan Howe Liang; Singapore	Kenji Onuma; Japan	Henrik Tamraz; Iran
Middleweight (75 kg)	Ko Bu-beng; Republic of China	Ebrahim Peiravi; Iran	Yoshio Hara; Japan
Light heavyweight (82.5 kg)	Jalal Mansouri; Iran	Minoru Kubota; Japan	Park Dong-cheol; South Korea
Middle heavyweight (90 kg)	Hassan Rahnavardi; Iran	Hwang Ho-dong; South Korea	Tan Kim Bee; Malaya
Heavyweight (+90 kg)	Firouz Pojhan; Iran	Lee Young-wan; South Korea	Gisaburo Seyama; Japan

== Medal table ==
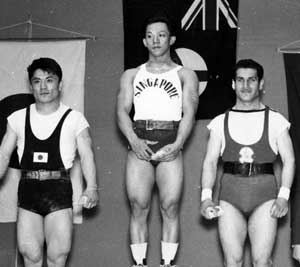
Medal winners of 67.5 kg. From left to right, Kenji Onuma, Tan Howe Liang and Henrik Tamraz

Rank	Nation	Gold	Silver	Bronze	Total
1	Iran (IRN)	3	4	1	8
2	South Korea (KOR)	2	2	1	5
3	Japan (JPN)	1	2	4	7
4	Republic of China (ROC)	1	0	0	1
4	Singapore (SIN)	1	0	0	1
6	Malaya (MAL)	0	0	1	1
6	Philippines (PHI)	0	0	1	1
Totals (7 entries)		8	8	8	24

== Participating nations ==
A total of 60 athletes from 11 nations competed in weightlifting at the 1958 Asian Games:

- Afghanistan (2)
- Burma (4)
- Indonesia (4)
- Iran (8)
- Japan (8)
- Malaya (4)
- Pakistan (4)
- Philippines (6)
- Republic of China (8)
- Singapore (8)
- South Korea (4)
