= Wrestling at the 1958 Asian Games =

Sport event at the 1958 Asian games

- Venue: Korakuen Ice Palace
- Dates: 25–27 May 1958
- Competitors: 44 from 7 nations

Wrestling was one of the sports which was held at the 1958 Asian Games in Korakuen Ice Palace, Tokyo, Japan between 25 and 27 May 1958. The competition included only men's freestyle events.

The competition used a form of negative points tournament, with negative points given for any result short of a fall.

== Schedule ==
●	Round	●	Last round

Event↓/Date →	25th Sun	26th Mon	27th Tue
Men's freestyle 52 kg	●	●	●
Men's freestyle 57 kg	●	●	●
Men's freestyle 62 kg	●	●	●
Men's freestyle 67 kg	●	●	●
Men's freestyle 73 kg	●	●	●
Men's freestyle 79 kg	●	●	●
Men's freestyle 87 kg	●	●	●
Men's freestyle +87 kg	●	●	●

== Medalists ==
Event	Gold	Silver	Bronze
Flyweight (52 kg)	Ryoji Yoshida; Japan	Khalil Rayatpanah; Iran	Shujah-ud-Din; Pakistan
Bantamweight (57 kg)	Minoru Iizuka; Japan	Muhammad Akhtar; Pakistan	Gholam Hossein Zandi; Iran
Featherweight (62 kg)	Kiyoshi Nakagawa; Japan	Siraj Din; Pakistan	Nasser Givehchi; Iran
Lightweight (67 kg)	Emam-Ali Habibi; Iran	Kazuo Abe; Japan	Bong Chang-won; South Korea
Welterweight (73 kg)	Yutaka Kaneko; Japan	Tofigh Jahanbakht; Iran	Muhammad Bashir; Pakistan
Middleweight (79 kg)	Takashi Nagai; Japan	Nabi Sorouri; Iran	Nicolas Arcales; Philippines
Light heavyweight (87 kg)	Gholamreza Takhti; Iran	Haruo Takagi; Japan	Hwang Chae-won; South Korea
Heavyweight (+87 kg)	Abbas Zandi; Iran	Muhammad Nazir; Pakistan	Mitsuhiro Ohira; Japan

== Medal table ==
Rank	Nation	Gold	Silver	Bronze	Total
1	Japan (JPN)	5	2	1	8
2	Iran (IRN)	3	3	2	8
3	Pakistan (PAK)	0	3	2	5
4	South Korea (KOR)	0	0	2	2
5	Philippines (PHI)	0	0	1	1
Totals (5 entries)		8	8	8	24

== Participating nations ==
A total of 44 athletes from 7 nations competed in wrestling at the 1958 Asian Games:

- Afghanistan (6)
- Iran (8)
- Japan (8)
- Malaya (2)
- Pakistan (8)
- Philippines (6)
- South Korea (6)
