= Weightlifting at the 1958 Asian Games – Men's 82.5 kg =

Men's 82.5 kg at the 1958 Asian Games
- Venue: National Stadium Gymnasium
- Date: 27 May 1958
- Competitors: 7 from 7 nations

Medalists
gold medal	Jalal Mansouri	Iran
silver medal	Minoru Kubota	Japan
bronze medal	Park Dong-cheol	South Korea

The men's light heavyweight (82.5 kilograms) event at the 1958 Asian Games took place on 27 May 1958 at the National Stadium Gymnasium in Tokyo, Japan.

Each weightlifter performed in clean and press, snatch and clean and jerk lifts, with the final score being the sum of the lifter's best result in each. The weightlifter received three attempts in each of the three lifts; the score for the lift was the heaviest weight successfully lifted.

Jalal Mansouri of Iran won the gold medal.

== Schedule ==
All times are Japan Standard Time (UTC+09:00)

Date	Time	Event
Tuesday, 27 May 1958	15:00	Final

== Results ==
Rank	Athlete	Body weight	Press (kg)				Snatch (kg)				Jerk (kg)				Total
Rank	Athlete	Body weight	1	2	3	Result	1	2	3	Result	1	2	3	Result	Total
1st place, gold medalist(s)	Jalal Mansouri (IRN)	82.0	122.5	127.5	~~130.0~~	127.5	117.5	~~122.5~~	122.5	122.5	150.0	~~160.0~~	~~160.0~~	150.0	400.0
2nd place, silver medalist(s)	Minoru Kubota (JPN)	81.8	117.5	122.5	~~125.0~~	122.5	107.5	112.5	~~117.5~~	112.5	140.0	145.0	~~150.0~~	145.0	380.0
3rd place, bronze medalist(s)	Park Dong-cheol (KOR)	81.2	102.5	~~107.5~~	~~107.5~~	102.5	110.0	115.0	~~120.0~~	115.0	135.0	140.0	~~147.5~~	140.0	357.5
4	Muhammad Iqbal Butt (PAK)	80.2	100.0	105.0	107.5	107.5	100.0	105.0	~~107.5~~	105.0	132.5	137.5	140.0	140.0	352.5
5	Kwan Keng Lam (MAL)	77.5	102.5	~~107.5~~	~~107.5~~	102.5	105.0	~~110.0~~	~~110.0~~	105.0	~~137.5~~	137.5	~~145.0~~	137.5	345.0
6	Yu Ko-ti (ROC)	81.0	102.5	107.5	~~110.0~~	107.5	100.0	105.0	~~110.0~~	105.0	130.0	~~135.0~~	~~137.5~~	130.0	342.5
7	Abdul Ahmad (AFG)	78.0	~~90.0~~	~~90.0~~	90.0	90.0	80.0	85.0	90.0	90.0	110.0	115.0	~~125.0~~	115.0	295.0
