= Wrestling at the 1958 Asian Games – Men's freestyle 79 kg =

Men's freestyle 79 kg at the 1958 Asian Games
- Venue: Korakuen Ice Palace
- Dates: 25–27 May 1958
- Competitors: 6 from 6 nations

Medalists
gold medal	Takashi Nagai	Japan
silver medal	Nabi Sorouri	Iran
bronze medal	Nicolas Arcales	Philippines

The men's freestyle 79 kilograms (middleweight) freestyle wrestling competition at the 1958 Asian Games in Tokyo was held from 25 to 27 May 1958.

The competition used a form of negative points tournament, with negative points given for any result short of a fall. Accumulation of 6 negative points eliminated the wrestler. When three wrestlers remained, they advanced to a final round. These 3 wrestlers each faced each other in a round-robin (with earlier results counting, if any had wrestled another before); record within the medal round determined medals, with bad points breaking ties.

== Schedule ==
All times are Japan Standard Time (UTC+09:00)

Date	Time	Event
Sunday, 25 May 1958	11:00	First round
Monday, 26 May 1958	10:00	Second round
Monday, 26 May 1958	19:00	Third round
Tuesday, 27 May 1958	10:00	Fourth round

== Results ==
=== First round ===
TBM		BM		BM		TBM
0	Nicolas Arcales (PHI)	0	Fall 3:49	4	Mohammad Rahim (AFG)	4
4	Chen Kim Sang (MAL)	4	Fall 0:22	0	Ghulam Rasool (PAK)	0
2	Nabi Sorouri (IRN)	2	Draw	2	Takashi Nagai (JPN)	2

=== Second round ===
TBM		BM		BM		TBM
0	Nicolas Arcales (PHI)	0	Fall 0:20	4	Chen Kim Sang (MAL)	8
8	Mohammad Rahim (AFG)	4	Fall 1:29	0	Nabi Sorouri (IRN)	2
3	Ghulam Rasool (PAK)	3	Decision	1	Takashi Nagai (JPN)	3

=== Third round ===
TBM		BM		BM		TBM
4	Nicolas Arcales (PHI)	4	Fall 2:17	0	Takashi Nagai (JPN)	3
6	Ghulam Rasool (PAK)	3	Decision	1	Nabi Sorouri (IRN)	3

=== Fourth round ===
TBM		BM		BM		TBM
8	Nicolas Arcales (PHI)	4	Fall 3:59	0	Nabi Sorouri (IRN)	3
3	Takashi Nagai (JPN)				Bye	

== Final standing ==
Rank	Athlete	Round				TBM	FBM
Rank	Athlete	1	2	3	4	TBM	FBM
1st place, gold medalist(s)	Takashi Nagai (JPN)	2	1	0	Bye	3	2 (Note: Tied on head-to-head result and total bad marks. The athletes' body weights were used as the tiebreaker.)
2nd place, silver medalist(s)	Nabi Sorouri (IRN)	2	0	1	0	3	2
3rd place, bronze medalist(s)	Nicolas Arcales (PHI)	0	0	4	4	8	8
4	Ghulam Rasool (PAK)	0	3	3		6	
5	Mohammad Rahim (AFG)	4	4			8	
6	Chen Kim Sang (MAL)	4	4			8	
