= Boxing at the 1958 Asian Games – Men's 71 kg =

Boxing competitions

Men's 71 kg at the 1958 Asian Games
- Venue: Korakuen Ice Palace
- Date: 28–31 May 1958
- Competitors: 6 from 6 nations

Medalists
gold medal	Osamu Takahashi	Japan
silver medal	Ghasem Amiryavari	Iran
bronze medal	Bait Hussain	Pakistan
bronze medal	Stanley Majid	Burma

The men's light middleweight (71 kilograms) event at the 1958 Asian Games took place from 28 to 31 May 1958 at Korakuen Ice Palace, Tokyo, Japan.

== Schedule ==
All times are Japan Standard Time (UTC+09:00)

Date	Time	Event
Wednesday, 28 May 1958	14:00	Quarterfinals
Friday, 30 May 1958	18:00	Semifinals
Saturday, 31 May 1958	18:00	Final

== Results ==
Legend

- KO — Won by knockout
- PTS — Won by points

Quarterfinals
Osamu Takahashi (JPN)	PTS
Lin Shin-chuan (ROC)
Stanley Majid (BIR)	PTS
Kim In-woon (KOR)

Semifinals
Ghasem Amiryavari (IRN)	PTS
Bait Hussain (PAK)
Osamu Takahashi (JPN)	KO
Stanley Majid (BIR)

Final
Ghasem Amiryavari (IRN)
Osamu Takahashi (JPN)	PTS
