= Boxing at the 1958 Asian Games – Men's 51 kg =

Boxing competitions

Men's 51 kg at the 1958 Asian Games
- Venue: Korakuen Ice Palace
- Date: 28–31 May 1958
- Competitors: 8 from 8 nations

Medalists
gold medal	Akio Maki	Japan
silver medal	Hla Nyunt	Burma
bronze medal	Kim Chang-han	South Korea
bronze medal	Ezaria Ilkhanoff	Iran

The men's flyweight (51 kilograms) event at the 1958 Asian Games took place from 28 to 31 May 1958 at Korakuen Ice Palace, Tokyo, Japan.

== Schedule ==
All times are Japan Standard Time (UTC+09:00)

Date	Time	Event
Wednesday, 28 May 1958	14:00	Quarterfinals
Friday, 30 May 1958	18:00	Semifinals
Saturday, 31 May 1958	18:00	Final

== Results ==
Legend

- PTS — Won by points

Quarterfinals
Akio Maki (JPN)	PTS
Yuan Sze-ho (ROC)
Kim Chang-han (KOR)	PTS
Somwang Komolsen (THA)
Ezaria Ilkhanoff (IRN)	PTS
Jose Bonus (PHI)
Vaithilingam Kesavan (SIN)
Hla Nyunt (BIR)	PTS

Semifinals
Akio Maki (JPN)	PTS
Kim Chang-han (KOR)
Ezaria Ilkhanoff (IRN)
Hla Nyunt (BIR)	PTS

Final
Akio Maki (JPN)	PTS
Hla Nyunt (BIR)
