= Boxing at the 1958 Asian Games – Men's 57 kg =

Boxing competitions

Men's 57 kg at the 1958 Asian Games
- Venue: Korakuen Ice Palace
- Date: 28–31 May 1958
- Competitors: 9 from 9 nations

Medalists
gold medal	Isami Ikeyama	Japan
silver medal	Dionisio Guevarra	Philippines
bronze medal	Austin Dunsford	Singapore
bronze medal	Song Soon-chun	South Korea

The men's featherweight (57 kilograms) event at the 1958 Asian Games took place from 28 to 31 May 1958 at Korakuen Ice Palace, Tokyo, Japan.

== Schedule ==
All times are Japan Standard Time (UTC+09:00)

Date	Time	Event
Wednesday, 28 May 1958	14:00	First round
Thursday, 29 May 1958	14:00	Quarterfinals
Friday, 30 May 1958	18:00	Semifinals
Saturday, 31 May 1958	18:00	Final

== Results ==
Legend

- KO — Won by knockout
- PTS — Won by points

First round
Dionisio Guevarra (PHI)	PTS
Ghulam Sarwar (PAK)

Quarterfinals
Isami Ikeyama (JPN)	PTS
Sadegh Aliakbarzadeh (IRN)
Siripongse Chooprayoon (THA)
Austin Dunsford (SIN)	PTS
Song Soon-chun (KOR)	PTS
Paik Yin-i (ROC)
San Hla (BIR)
Dionisio Guevarra (PHI)	PTS

Semifinals
Isami Ikeyama (JPN)	KO
Austin Dunsford (SIN)
Song Soon-chun (KOR)
Dionisio Guevarra (PHI)	PTS

Final
Isami Ikeyama (JPN)	PTS
Dionisio Guevarra (PHI)
