= Weightlifting at the 1958 Asian Games – Men's 75 kg =

Men's 75 kg at the 1958 Asian Games
- Venue: National Stadium Gymnasium
- Date: 27 May 1958
- Competitors: 9 from 9 nations

Medalists
gold medal	Ko Bu-beng	Republic of China
silver medal	Ebrahim Peiravi	Iran
bronze medal	Yoshio Hara	Japan

The men's middleweight (75 kilograms) event at the 1958 Asian Games took place on 27 May 1958 at the National Stadium Gymnasium in Tokyo, Japan.

Each weightlifter performed in clean and press, snatch and clean and jerk lifts, with the final score being the sum of the lifter's best result in each. The weightlifter received three attempts in each of the three lifts; the score for the lift was the heaviest weight successfully lifted.

== Schedule ==
All times are Japan Standard Time (UTC+09:00)

Date	Time	Event
Tuesday, 27 May 1958	10:00	Final

== Results ==
Legend

- NM — No mark

Rank	Athlete	Body weight	Press (kg)				Snatch (kg)				Jerk (kg)				Total
Rank	Athlete	Body weight	1	2	3	Result	1	2	3	Result	1	2	3	Result	Total
1st place, gold medalist(s)	Ko Bu-beng (ROC)	73.2	105.0	~~110.0~~	110.0	110.0	105.0	110.0	~~112.5~~	110.0	~~150.0~~	150.0	160.0	160.0	380.0
2nd place, silver medalist(s)	Ebrahim Peiravi (IRN)	74.5	110.0	115.0	~~117.5~~	115.0	112.5	117.5	~~120.0~~	117.5	142.5	147.5	~~150.0~~	147.5	380.0
3rd place, bronze medalist(s)	Yoshio Hara (JPN)	73.6	~~107.5~~	~~107.5~~	107.5	107.5	~~107.5~~	107.5	112.5	112.5	~~140.0~~	140.0	~~152.5~~	140.0	360.0
4	Maung Bu (BIR)	70.6	105.0	~~110.0~~	~~110.0~~	105.0	~~100.0~~	100.0	~~105.0~~	100.0	132.5	137.5	140.0	140.0	345.0
5	Gustaaf Tirajoh (INA)	72.3	~~95.0~~	~~95.0~~	95.0	95.0	105.0	110.0	~~115.0~~	110.0	~~130.0~~	130.0	~~137.5~~	130.0	335.0
6	Eufemio de los Reyes (PHI)	74.2	100.0	~~105.0~~	105.0	105.0	87.5	92.5	~~95.0~~	92.5	120.0	125.0	~~130.0~~	125.0	322.5
7	Abdul Rashid (PAK)	72.2	95.0	100.0	~~102.5~~	100.0	87.5	~~92.5~~	92.5	92.5	117.5	122.5	125.0	125.0	317.5
8	Syed Baba (AFG)	71.5	~~80.0~~	~~80.0~~	80.0	80.0	70.0	75.0	80.0	80.0	95.0	105.0	~~110.0~~	105.0	265.0
—	Kim Sung-jip (KOR)	74.7	~~120.0~~	120.0	~~125.0~~	120.0	105.0	~~110.0~~	110.0	110.0	~~140.0~~	~~140.0~~	~~140.0~~	—	NM
