= Weightlifting at the 1958 Asian Games – Men's 56 kg =

1958 Asian Games Weightlifting competition

Men's 56 kg at the 1958 Asian Games
- Venue: National Stadium Gymnasium
- Date: 25 May 1958
- Competitors: 6 from 6 nations

Medalists
gold medal	Shigeo Kogure	Japan
silver medal	Mahmoud Namjoo	Iran
bronze medal	Alberto Nogar	Philippines

The men's bantamweight (56 kilograms) event at the 1958 Asian Games took place on 25 May 1958 at the National Stadium Gymnasium in Tokyo, Japan.

Each weightlifter performed in clean and press, snatch and clean and jerk lifts, with the final score being the sum of the lifter's best result in each. The weightlifter received three attempts in each of the three lifts; the score for the lift was the heaviest weight successfully lifted.

== Schedule ==
All times are Japan Standard Time (UTC+09:00)

Date	Time	Event
Sunday, 25 May 1958	15:00	Final

== Results ==
Legend

- NM — No mark

Rank	Athlete	Body weight	Press (kg)				Snatch (kg)				Jerk (kg)				Total
Rank	Athlete	Body weight	1	2	3	Result	1	2	3	Result	1	2	3	Result	Total
1st place, gold medalist(s)	Shigeo Kogure (JPN)	55.7	90.0	~~95.0~~	95.0	95.0	95.0	~~100.0~~	100.0	100.0	125.0	130.0	~~132.5~~	130.0	325.0
2nd place, silver medalist(s)	Mahmoud Namjoo (IRN)	55.9	95.0	~~100.0~~	100.0	100.0	~~95.0~~	95.0	~~100.0~~	95.0	120.0	~~127.5~~	~~127.5~~	120.0	315.0
3rd place, bronze medalist(s)	Alberto Nogar (PHI)	55.5	~~85.0~~	~~85.0~~	85.0	85.0	85.0	90.0	92.5	92.5	115.0	120.0	~~122.5~~	120.0	297.5
4	Lau Chee-wai (ROC)	55.2	87.5	92.5	~~95.0~~	92.5	85.0	~~90.0~~	~~90.0~~	85.0	112.5	~~117.5~~	~~117.5~~	112.5	290.0
—	Yu In-ho (KOR)	55.8	90.0	~~95.0~~	95.0	95.0	90.0	~~95.0~~	95.0	95.0	~~130.0~~	~~130.0~~	~~137.5~~	—	NM
—	Chua Phung Kim (SIN)	54.6	82.5	87.5	~~90.0~~	87.5	90.0	~~97.5~~	~~100.0~~	90.0	~~117.5~~	~~117.5~~	~~117.5~~	—	NM
