= Boxing at the 1958 Asian Games – Men's 54 kg =

Boxing competitions

Men's 54 kg at the 1958 Asian Games
- Venue: Korakuen Ice Palace
- Date: 28–31 May 1958
- Competitors: 9 from 9 nations

Medalists
gold medal	Thein Myint	Burma
silver medal	Takeo Suzuki	Japan
bronze medal	Muhammad Nasir	Pakistan
bronze medal	Jacinto Diaz	Philippines

The men's bantamweight (54 kilograms) event at the 1958 Asian Games took place from 28 to 31 May 1958 at Korakuen Ice Palace, Tokyo, Japan.

== Schedule ==
All times are Japan Standard Time (UTC+09:00)

Date	Time	Event
Wednesday, 28 May 1958	14:00	First round
Thursday, 29 May 1958	14:00	Quarterfinals
Friday, 30 May 1958	18:00	Semifinals
Saturday, 31 May 1958	18:00	Final

== Results ==
Legend

- PTS — Won by points

First round
Thein Myint (BIR)	PTS
Somsak Piamcharern (THA)

Quarterfinals
Muhammad Nasir (PAK)	PTS
Hang Tshun-yun (ROC)
Takeo Suzuki (JPN)	PTS
Karapet Kochar (IRN)
Jacinto Diaz (PHI)	PTS
Men Than (CAM)
Kang Choon-won (KOR)
Thein Myint (BIR)	PTS

Semifinals
Muhammad Nasir (PAK)
Takeo Suzuki (JPN)	PTS
Jacinto Diaz (PHI)
Thein Myint (BIR)	PTS

Final
Takeo Suzuki (JPN)
Thein Myint (BIR)	PTS
