= Weightlifting at the 1958 Asian Games – Men's +90 kg =

Men's +90 kg at the 1958 Asian Games
- Venue: National Stadium Gymnasium
- Date: 28 May 1958
- Competitors: 7 from 7 nations

Medalists
gold medal	Firouz Pojhan	Iran
silver medal	Lee Young-wan	South Korea
bronze medal	Gisaburo Seyama	Japan

The men's heavyweight (+90 kilograms) event at the 1958 Asian Games took place on 28 May 1958 at the National Stadium Gymnasium in Tokyo, Japan.

Each weightlifter performed in clean and press, snatch and clean and jerk lifts, with the final score being the sum of the lifter's best result in each. The weightlifter received three attempts in each of the three lifts; the score for the lift was the heaviest weight successfully lifted.

Firouz Pojhan of Iran won the gold medal.

== Schedule ==
All times are Japan Standard Time (UTC+09:00)

Date	Time	Event
Wednesday, 28 May 1958	15:00	Final

== Results ==
Rank	Athlete	Body weight	Press (kg)				Snatch (kg)				Jerk (kg)				Total
Rank	Athlete	Body weight	1	2	3	Result	1	2	3	Result	1	2	3	Result	Total
1st place, gold medalist(s)	Firouz Pojhan (IRN)	98.5	145.0	~~152.5~~	152.5	152.5	125.0	132.5	~~135.0~~	132.5	160.0	170.0	175.0	175.0	460.0
2nd place, silver medalist(s)	Lee Young-wan (KOR)	93.7	115.0	120.0	~~122.5~~	120.0	110.0	115.0	~~117.5~~	115.0	140.0	~~150.0~~	150.0	150.0	385.0
3rd place, bronze medalist(s)	Gisaburo Seyama (JPN)	98.2	110.0	115.0	120.0	120.0	110.0	117.5	120.0	120.0	140.0	~~145.0~~	145.0	145.0	385.0
4	Farzand Ali (PAK)	91.3	110.0	~~115.0~~	~~115.0~~	110.0	100.0	105.0	107.5	107.5	135.0	140.0	~~142.5~~	140.0	357.5
5	Ong Khe-hum (ROC)	117.2	107.5	115.0	~~120.0~~	115.0	~~95.0~~	95.0	~~112.5~~	95.0	135.0	~~150.0~~	~~150.0~~	135.0	345.0
6	Gouw Thay San (INA)	96.2	107.5	115.0	~~117.5~~	115.0	90.0	97.5	~~100.0~~	97.5	~~127.5~~	127.5	~~132.5~~	127.5	340.0
7	Felizardo Valcos (PHI)	100.2	~~105.0~~	105.0	110.0	110.0	90.0	~~95.0~~	~~95.0~~	90.0	127.5	132.5	~~137.5~~	132.5	332.5
