= Weightlifting at the 1958 Asian Games – Men's 60 kg =

Men's 60 kg at the 1958 Asian Games
- Venue: National Stadium Gymnasium
- Date: 26 May 1958
- Competitors: 9 from 9 nations

Medalists
| gold medal | Lee Taik-yong | South Korea |
| silver medal | Ali Safa-Sonboli | Iran |
| bronze medal | Fumio Takeda | Japan |

The men's featherweight (60 kilograms) event at the 1958 Asian Games took place on 26 May 1958 at the National Stadium Gymnasium in Tokyo, Japan.

Each weightlifter performed in clean and press, snatch and clean and jerk lifts, with the final score being the sum of the lifter's best result in each. The weightlifter received three attempts in each of the three lifts; the score for the lift was the heaviest weight successfully lifted.

Lee Taik-yong of South Korea won the gold medal.

== Schedule ==
All times are Japan Standard Time (UTC+09:00)

| Date | Time | Event |
|---|---|---|
| Monday, 26 May 1958 | 10:00 | Final |

== Results ==
| Rank | Athlete | Body weight | Press (kg) | | | | Snatch (kg) | | | | Jerk (kg) | | | | Total |
| Rank | Athlete | Body weight | 1 | 2 | 3 | Result | 1 | 2 | 3 | Result | 1 | 2 | 3 | Result | Total |
|---|---|---|---|---|---|---|---|---|---|---|---|---|---|---|---|
| 1st place, gold medalist(s) | Lee Taik-yong (KOR) | 59.8 | 100.0 | ~~105.0~~ | ~~105.0~~ | 100.0 | 97.5 | 102.5 | 105.0 | 105.0 | 127.5 | 132.5 | 140.0 | 140.0 | 345.0 |
| 2nd place, silver medalist(s) | Ali Safa-Sonboli (IRN) | 59.6 | 100.0 | 105.0 | 107.5 | 107.5 | 95.0 | 100.0 | 102.5 | 102.5 | 125.0 | 130.0 | 132.5 | 132.5 | 342.5 |
| 3rd place, bronze medalist(s) | Fumio Takeda (JPN) | 59.9 | 100.0 | ~~105.0~~ | 105.0 | 105.0 | 92.5 | ~~97.5~~ | 97.5 | 97.5 | 130.0 | ~~140.0~~ | ~~142.5~~ | 130.0 | 332.5 |
| 4 | Tan Ser Cher (SIN) | 58.8 | 95.0 | 100.0 | ~~102.5~~ | 100.0 | ~~87.5~~ | ~~92.5~~ | 92.5 | 92.5 | 127.5 | ~~132.5~~ | 132.5 | 132.5 | 325.0 |
| 5 | Tun Maung Kywe (BIR) | 58.9 | 95.0 | 100.0 | ~~102.5~~ | 100.0 | 92.5 | 97.5 | ~~100.0~~ | 97.5 | 120.0 | ~~125.0~~ | 125.0 | 125.0 | 322.5 |
| 6 | Asber Nasution (INA) | 59.5 | 90.0 | 95.0 | 97.5 | 97.5 | 85.0 | ~~90.0~~ | 90.0 | 90.0 | 115.0 | 120.0 | ~~125.0~~ | 120.0 | 307.5 |
| 7 | Cheah Sek Thong (MAL) | 58.9 | 90.0 | 95.0 | ~~97.5~~ | 95.0 | 87.5 | ~~92.5~~ | ~~92.5~~ | 87.5 | ~~120.0~~ | 120.0 | ~~125.0~~ | 120.0 | 302.5 |
| 8 | Rodrigo del Rosario (PHI) | 59.6 | ~~97.5~~ | 97.5 | ~~102.5~~ | 97.5 | 80.0 | 85.0 | ~~87.5~~ | 85.0 | 117.5 | ~~122.5~~ | ~~122.5~~ | 117.5 | 300.0 |
| 9 | Lin Mo-chun (ROC) | 59.0 | 82.5 | ~~87.5~~ | 87.5 | 87.5 | 87.5 | ~~92.5~~ | 92.5 | 92.5 | 115.0 | ~~120.0~~ | ~~120.0~~ | 115.0 | 295.0 |
