= Boxing at the 1958 Asian Games – Men's 81 kg =

Boxing competitions

Men's 81 kg at the 1958 Asian Games
- Venue: Korakuen Ice Palace
- Date: 28–31 May 1958
- Competitors: 3 from 3 nations

Medalists
gold medal	Shuichi Nakayama	Japan
silver medal	Sultan Mahmood	Pakistan
bronze medal	Akbar Khojini	Iran

The men's light heavyweight (81 kilograms) event at the 1958 Asian Games took place from 28 to 31 May 1958 at Korakuen Ice Palace, Tokyo, Japan.

== Schedule ==
All times are Japan Standard Time (UTC+09:00)

Date	Time	Event
Wednesday, 28 May 1958	14:00	Semifinals
Saturday, 31 May 1958	18:00	Final

== Results ==
Legend

- PTS — Won by points

Semifinals		Final
		Shuichi Nakayama (JPN)	PTS
Sultan Mahmood (PAK)	PTS	Sultan Mahmood (PAK)
Akbar Khojini (IRN)
