= Wrestling at the 1958 Asian Games – Men's freestyle 67 kg =

Men's freestyle 67 kg at the 1958 Asian Games
- Venue: Korakuen Ice Palace
- Dates: 25–27 May 1958
- Competitors: 6 from 6 nations

Medalists
gold medal	Emam-Ali Habibi	Iran
silver medal	Kazuo Abe	Japan
bronze medal	Bong Chang-won	South Korea

The men's freestyle 67 kilograms (lightweight) wrestling competition at the 1958 Asian Games in Tokyo was held from 25 to 27 May 1958.

The competition used a form of negative points tournament, with negative points given for any result short of a fall. Accumulation of 6 negative points eliminated the wrestler. When three wrestlers remained, they advanced to a final round. These 3 wrestlers each faced each other in a round-robin (with earlier results counting, if any had wrestled another before); record within the medal round determined medals, with bad points breaking ties.

== Schedule ==
All times are Japan Standard Time (UTC+09:00)

Date	Time	Event
Sunday, 25 May 1958	11:00	First round
Monday, 26 May 1958	10:00	Second round
Monday, 26 May 1958	19:00	Third round
Tuesday, 27 May 1958	10:00	Fourth round

== Results ==
=== First round ===
TBM		BM		BM		TBM
1	Bong Chang-won (KOR)	1	Decision	3	Mateo Tanaquin (PHI)	3
0	Emam-Ali Habibi (IRN)	0	Fall 1:49	4	Muhammad Ashraf (PAK)	4
1	Kazuo Abe (JPN)	1	Decision	3	Mohammad Ebrahim Khedri (AFG)	3

=== Second round ===
TBM		BM		BM		TBM
4	Bong Chang-won (KOR)	3	Decision	1	Emam-Ali Habibi (IRN)	1
7	Mateo Tanaquin (PHI)	4	Fall 2:34	0	Kazuo Abe (JPN)	1
5	Muhammad Ashraf (PAK)	1	Decision	3	Mohammad Ebrahim Khedri (AFG)	6

=== Third round ===
TBM		BM		BM		TBM
6	Bong Chang-won (KOR)	2	Draw	2	Muhammad Ashraf (PAK)	7
2	Emam-Ali Habibi (IRN)	1	Decision	3	Kazuo Abe (JPN)	4

=== Fourth round ===
TBM		BM		BM		TBM
10	Bong Chang-won (KOR)	4	Fall 3:59	0	Kazuo Abe (JPN)	4
2	Emam-Ali Habibi (IRN)				Bye	

== Final standing ==
Rank	Athlete	Round				TBM	FBM
Rank	Athlete	1	2	3	4	TBM	FBM
1st place, gold medalist(s)	Emam-Ali Habibi (IRN)	0	1	1	Bye	2	2
2nd place, silver medalist(s)	Kazuo Abe (JPN)	1	0	3	0	4	3
3rd place, bronze medalist(s)	Bong Chang-won (KOR)	1	3	2	4	10	7
4	Muhammad Ashraf (PAK)	4	1	2		7	
5	Mohammad Ebrahim Khedri (AFG)	3	3			6	
6	Mateo Tanaquin (PHI)	3	4			6	
