= Boxing at the 1958 Asian Games – Men's 63.5 kg =

Boxing competitions

Men's 63.5 kg at the 1958 Asian Games
- Venue: Korakuen Ice Palace
- Date: 28–31 May 1958
- Competitors: 6 from 6 nations

Medalists
gold medal	Shigemasa Kawakami	Japan
silver medal	Vazik Kazarian	Iran
bronze medal	Sueb Chundakowsolaya	Thailand
bronze medal	Kim Deuk-bong	South Korea

The men's light welterweight (63.5 kilograms) event at the 1958 Asian Games took place from 28 to 31 May 1958 at Korakuen Ice Palace, Tokyo, Japan.

== Schedule ==
All times are Japan Standard Time (UTC+09:00)

Date	Time	Event
Wednesday, 28 May 1958	14:00	Quarterfinals
Friday, 30 May 1958	18:00	Semifinals
Saturday, 31 May 1958	18:00	Final

== Results ==
Legend

- KO — Won by knockout
- PTS — Won by points

Quarterfinals
Kim Deuk-bong (KOR)	KO
Turadio Carbungco (PHI)
Shigemasa Kawakami (JPN)	KO
Liao Sien-cheng (ROC)

Semifinals
Vazik Kazarian (IRN)	PTS
Sueb Chundakowsolaya (THA)
Kim Deuk-bong (KOR)
Shigemasa Kawakami (JPN)	PTS

Final
Vazik Kazarian (IRN)
Shigemasa Kawakami (JPN)	PTS
