= Weightlifting at the 1958 Asian Games – Men's 52 kg =

Men's 52 kg at the 1958 Asian Games
- Venue: National Stadium Gymnasium
- Date: 25 May 1958
- Competitors: 7 from 7 nations

Medalists
gold medal	Lee Jang-woo	South Korea
silver medal	Esmaeil Elmkhah	Iran
bronze medal	Keiji Hagio	Japan

The men's flyweight (52 kilograms) event at the 1958 Asian Games took place on 25 May 1958 at the National Stadium Gymnasium in Tokyo, Japan.

The flyweight division has been added as the lightest weight category for the 1958 Asian Games.

Each weightlifter performed in clean and press, snatch and clean and jerk lifts, with the final score being the sum of the lifter's best result in each. The weightlifter received three attempts in each of the three lifts; the score for the lift was the heaviest weight successfully lifted.

== Schedule ==
All times are Japan Standard Time (UTC+09:00)

Date	Time	Event
Sunday, 25 May 1958	10:00	Final

== Results ==
Rank	Athlete	Body weight	Press (kg)				Snatch (kg)				Jerk (kg)				Total
Rank	Athlete	Body weight	1	2	3	Result	1	2	3	Result	1	2	3	Result	Total
1st place, gold medalist(s)	Lee Jang-woo (KOR)	51.8	75.0	80.0	~~82.5~~	80.0	82.5	87.5	90.0	90.0	~~110.0~~	~~110.0~~	110.0	110.0	280.0
2nd place, silver medalist(s)	Esmaeil Elmkhah (IRN)	52.0	80.0	85.0	87.5	87.5	80.0	85.0	~~87.5~~	85.0	105.0	~~110.0~~	~~110.0~~	105.0	277.5
3rd place, bronze medalist(s)	Keiji Hagio (JPN)	51.7	75.0	~~82.5~~	~~82.5~~	75.0	80.0	~~85.0~~	85.0	85.0	110.0	~~117.5~~	~~117.5~~	110.0	270.0
4	Chean Mean-yau (ROC)	51.4	77.5	82.5	~~85.0~~	82.5	80.0	~~85.0~~	~~85.0~~	80.0	105.0	~~110.0~~	~~110.0~~	105.0	267.5
5	Ow Fook Seng (SIN)	51.3	77.5	82.5	85.0	85.0	75.0	~~82.5~~	~~82.5~~	75.0	105.0	~~110.0~~	~~110.0~~	105.0	265.0
6	Godofredo Canlas (PHI)	51.0	72.5	~~77.5~~	~~77.5~~	72.5	~~77.5~~	~~82.5~~	82.5	82.5	~~102.5~~	102.5	~~107.5~~	102.5	257.5
7	Hla Aung (BIR)	51.5	75.0	~~80.0~~	~~80.0~~	75.0	~~77.5~~	77.5	~~80.0~~	77.5	~~100.0~~	100.0	~~105.0~~	100.0	252.5
