= Wrestling at the 1958 Asian Games – Men's freestyle 87 kg =

Men's freestyle 87 kg at the 1958 Asian Games
- Venue: Korakuen Ice Palace
- Dates: 25–27 May 1958
- Competitors: 5 from 5 nations

Medalists
gold medal	Gholamreza Takhti	Iran
silver medal	Haruo Takagi	Japan
bronze medal	Hwang Chae-won	South Korea

The men's freestyle 87 kilograms (light heavyweight) freestyle wrestling competition at the 1958 Asian Games in Tokyo was held from 25 to 27 May 1958.

The competition used a form of negative points tournament, with negative points given for any result short of a fall. Accumulation of 6 negative points eliminated the wrestler. When three wrestlers remained, they advanced to a final round. These 3 wrestlers each faced each other in a round-robin (with earlier results counting, if any had wrestled another before); record within the medal round determined medals, with bad points breaking ties.

== Schedule ==
All times are Japan Standard Time (UTC+09:00)

Date	Time	Event
Sunday, 25 May 1958	11:00	First round
Monday, 26 May 1958	10:00	Second round
Monday, 26 May 1958	19:00	Third round
Tuesday, 27 May 1958	10:00	Fourth round

== Results ==
=== First round ===
TBM		BM		BM		TBM
4	Baryalai Naseri (AFG)	4	Fall 1:38	0	Gholamreza Takhti (IRN)	0
0	Hwang Chae-won (KOR)	0	Fall 6:04	4	Muhammad Ali (PAK)	4
0	Haruo Takagi (JPN)				Bye	

=== Second round ===
TBM		BM		BM		TBM
0	Haruo Takagi (JPN)	0	Walkover	4	Baryalai Naseri (AFG)	8
0	Gholamreza Takhti (IRN)	0	Fall 3:26	4	Hwang Chae-won (KOR)	4
4	Muhammad Ali (PAK)				Bye	

=== Third round ===
TBM		BM		BM		TBM
8	Muhammad Ali (PAK)	4	Fall 4:59	0	Gholamreza Takhti (IRN)	0
1	Haruo Takagi (JPN)	1	Decision	3	Hwang Chae-won (KOR)	7

=== Fourth round ===
TBM		BM		BM		TBM
5	Haruo Takagi (JPN)	4	Fall 4:39	0	Gholamreza Takhti (IRN)	0
7	Hwang Chae-won (KOR)				Bye	

== Final standing ==
Rank	Athlete	Round				TBM	FBM
Rank	Athlete	1	2	3	4	TBM	FBM
1st place, gold medalist(s)	Gholamreza Takhti (IRN)	0	0	0	0	0	0
2nd place, silver medalist(s)	Haruo Takagi (JPN)	Bye	0	1	4	5	5
3rd place, bronze medalist(s)	Hwang Chae-won (KOR)	0	4	3	Bye	7	7
4	Muhammad Ali (PAK)	4	Bye	4		8	
5	Baryalai Naseri (AFG)	4	4			8	
