= Boxing at the 1958 Asian Games – Men's +81 kg =

Boxing competitions

Men's +81 kg at the 1958 Asian Games
- Venue: Korakuen Ice Palace
- Date: 31 May 1958
- Competitors: 2 from 2 nations

Medalists
gold medal	Shunzo Nishio	Japan
silver medal	Khalid Mumtaz	Pakistan

The men's heavyweight (+81 kilograms) event at the 1958 Asian Games took place on 31 May 1958 at Korakuen Ice Palace, Tokyo, Japan.

== Schedule ==
All times are Japan Standard Time (UTC+09:00)

Date	Time	Event
Saturday, 31 May 1958	18:00	Final

== Results ==
Legend

- PTS — Won by points

Final
Shunzo Nishio (JPN)	PTS
Khalid Mumtaz (PAK)
