= Fyodor Bogdanovsky =

Soviet weightlifter (1930–2014)

- Pete George (left) and Fyodor Bogdanovsky (center) and Ermanno Pignatti at the 1956 Olympics

Personal information
- Born: 16 April 1930 Sheteyevo, Tver Oblast, Russian SFSR, Soviet Union
- Died: 2 October 2014 (aged 84) Saint Petersburg, Russia

Sport
- Sport: Weightlifting
- Club: Soviet Army, St. Petersburg
Medal record
Representing the Soviet Union
Olympic Games
Gold medal – first place	1956 Melbourne	-75 kg
World Weightlifting Championships
Silver medal – second place	1954 Vienna	Middleweight
Silver medal – second place	1955 Munich	Middleweight
Silver medal – second place	1957 Tehran	Middleweight
Silver medal – second place	1958 Stockholm	Middleweight
Silver medal – second place	1959 Warsaw	Middleweight
European Weightlifting Championships
Gold medal – first place	1954 Vienna	Middleweight
Gold medal – first place	1955 Munich	Middleweight
Gold medal – first place	1958 Stockholm	Middleweight
Gold medal – first place	1959 Warsaw	Middleweight

Fyodor Fyodorovich Bogdanovsky (Russian: Фёдор Фёдорович Богдановский 16 April 1930 – 2 October 2014) was a Soviet weightlifter. Between 1954 and 1959 he won an Olympic gold medal, four European titles, and five silver medals at world championships, losing to either Pete George or Tommy Kono. He set eight ratified world records, five in the press and three in the total.

Bogdanovsky took up weightlifting in 1948 and retired in 1963. Later he trained weightlifters in Saint Petersburg, and in the 1970s worked with the Soviet weightlifting team.
