= Wrestling at the 1958 Asian Games – Men's freestyle 52 kg =

Men's freestyle 52 kg at the 1958 Asian Games
- Venue: Korakuen Ice Palace
- Dates: 25–27 May 1958
- Competitors: 5 from 5 nations

Medalists
gold medal	Ryoji Yoshida	Japan
silver medal	Khalil Rayatpanah	Iran
bronze medal	Shujah-ud-Din	Pakistan

The men's freestyle 52 kilograms (flyweight) freestyle wrestling competition at the 1958 Asian Games in Tokyo was held from 25 to 27 May 1958.

The competition used a form of negative points tournament, with negative points given for any result short of a fall. Accumulation of 6 negative points eliminated the wrestler. When three wrestlers remained, they advanced to a final round. These 3 wrestlers each faced each other in a round-robin (with earlier results counting, if any had wrestled another before); record within the medal round determined medals, with bad points breaking ties.

== Schedule ==
All times are Japan Standard Time (UTC+09:00)

Date	Time	Event
Sunday, 25 May 1958	11:00	First round
Monday, 26 May 1958	10:00	Second round
Monday, 26 May 1958	19:00	Third round
Tuesday, 27 May 1958	10:00	Fourth round

== Results ==
=== First round ===
TBM		BM		BM		TBM
3	Nicolas Alcantara (PHI)	3	Decision	1	Shujah-ud-Din (PAK)	1
0	Ryoji Yoshida (JPN)	0	Fall 8:49	4	Kim Ji-kang (KOR)	4
0	Khalil Rayatpanah (IRN)				Bye	

=== Second round ===
TBM		BM		BM		TBM
0	Khalil Rayatpanah (IRN)	0	Fall 5:49	4	Nicolas Alcantara (PHI)	7
5	Shujah-ud-Din (PAK)	4	Fall 9:15	0	Ryoji Yoshida (JPN)	0
4	Kim Ji-kang (KOR)				Bye	

=== Third round ===
TBM		BM		BM		TBM
7	Kim Ji-kang (KOR)	3	Decision	1	Shujah-ud-Din (PAK)	6
3	Khalil Rayatpanah (IRN)	3	Decision	1	Ryoji Yoshida (JPN)	1

=== Fourth round ===
TBM		BM		BM		TBM
4	Khalil Rayatpanah (IRN)	1	Decision	3	Shujah-ud-Din (PAK)	9
1	Ryoji Yoshida (JPN)				Bye	

== Final standing ==
Rank	Athlete	Round				TBM	FBM
Rank	Athlete	1	2	3	4	TBM	FBM
1st place, gold medalist(s)	Ryoji Yoshida (JPN)	0	0	1	Bye	1	1
2nd place, silver medalist(s)	Khalil Rayatpanah (IRN)	Bye	0	3	1	4	4
3rd place, bronze medalist(s)	Shujah-ud-Din (PAK)	1	4	1	3	9	7
4	Kim Ji-kang (KOR)	4	Bye	3		7	
5	Nicolas Alcantara (PHI)	3	4			7	
