= Jan Czepułkowski =

Polish weightlifter (1930–2016)

Jan Czepulkowski
Personal information
- Nationality: Poland
- Born: 17 July 1930 Mołodeczno, Poland
- Died: 26 January 2016 (aged 85)

Sport
- Country: Poland
- Sport: Weightlifting
- Weight class: 67.5 kg
- Club: AZS Warszawa, Warszawa (POL)
- Team: National team
Medal record
Men's Weightlifting
Representing Poland
World Championships
Bronze medal – third place	1957 Tehran	67.5 kg
- Updated on 6 October 2016

Jan Czepulkowski (17 July 1930 – 26 January 2016) was a Belarusian-born Polish male weightlifter, who competed in the lightweight class and represented Poland at international competitions. He won the bronze medal at the 1957 World Weightlifting Championships in the 67.5 kg category. He participated at the 1956 Summer Olympics in the Men's Lightweight event. Czepułkowski had furthermore the following podium finishes at major championships: 3rd in the 1956 European Championships Middleweight class (362.5 kg); 2nd in the 1957 European Championships Lightweight class (352.5 kg) and 3rd in the 1959 European Championships Lightweight class (360.0 kg).
