= Arkady Vorobyov =

Russian weightlifter (1924–2012)

Personal information
- Full name: Arkady Nikitich Vorobyov
- Born: 3 October 1924 Mordovo, Tambov Oblast, Russian SFSR, Soviet Union
- Died: 22 December 2012 (aged 88) Moscow, Russia
- Height: 1.69 m (5 ft 7 in)
- Weight: 82–90 kg (181–198 lb)

Sport
- Sport: Weightlifting
- Club: Armed Forces
Medal record
Representing Soviet Union
Olympic Games
Gold medal – first place	1956 Melbourne	-90 kg
Gold medal – first place	1960 Rome	-90 kg
Bronze medal – third place	1952 Helsinki	-82.5 kg
World Weightlifting Championships
Gold medal – first place	1953 Stockholm	-82.5 kg
Gold medal – first place	1954 Vienna	-90 kg
Gold medal – first place	1955 Munich	-90 kg
Gold medal – first place	1957 Tehran	-90 kg
Gold medal – first place	1958 Stockholm	-90 kg
Silver medal – second place	1950 Paris	-82.5 kg
Silver medal – second place	1959 Warsaw	-90 kg
Bronze medal – third place	1961 Vienna	-90 kg
European Weightlifting Championships
Gold medal – first place	1950 Paris	-82.5 kg
Gold medal – first place	1953 Stockholm	-82.5 kg
Gold medal – first place	1954 Vienna	-90 kg
Gold medal – first place	1955 Munich	-90 kg
Gold medal – first place	1958 Stockholm	-90 kg
Silver medal – second place	1952 Helsinki	-82.5 kg
Silver medal – second place	1959 Warsaw	-90 kg
Bronze medal – third place	1961 Vienna	-90 kg

Arkady Nikitich Vorobyov (Russian: Аркадий Никитич Воробьёв; 3 October 1924 – 22 December 2012) was a Soviet and Russian weightlifter, weightlifting coach, scientist and writer. He competed at the 1952, 1956 and 1960 Olympics and won one bronze and two gold medals. Between 1950 and 1960 he set 16 official world records. Later for many years he led the national team and the Soviet weightlifting program. In 1995 he was inducted into the International Weightlifting Federation Hall of Fame.

== Biography ==
Vorobyov was born in the village of Mordovo in Tambov Oblast, Russia. During World War II he served in the Soviet Navy on the Black Sea. After the war he worked on the restoration of the Odessa sea port, clearing the mines as a diver. There Vorobyov got acquainted with weightlifting, his first competition being the sea port championship.

He later won several world (1953–55, 1957 and 1958) and European titles (1950, 1953–55, 1958) competing in the light-heavyweight and middle-heavyweight categories. Between 1950 and 1960 he set 26 world records, 16 of them became official: two in the press, nine in the snatch, one in the clean and jerk and four in the total. For many years Vorobyov captained the Soviet weightlifting team, and after retiring from competitions became its head coach.

In 1957 Vorobyov graduated from a medical institute; in 1962 he defended a PhD and in 1970 a habilitation on weightlifting training at the Institute of Aviation and Space Medicine in Moscow. Since 1977 he was the rector of the Moscow Oblast Institute of Physical Culture and Sports. Over his scientific career Vorobyov published five textbooks and about 200 scientific papers on weightlifting. He was a leader of the Soviet weightlifting training program and one of the first Soviet scientists to apply computers to the training process. His students included elite coaches and sportsmen from Russia, Bulgaria, Cuba, Hungary and many other countries.
