= Dave Ashman =

American weightlifter (1932–1984)

Personal information
- Full name: David Carlyle Ashman
- Born: October 13, 1932 Norwood, Massachusetts
- Died: July 20, 1984 (aged 51) Los Angeles, California

Sport
- Country: United States
- Sport: Weightlifting
- Weight class: +90 kg
- Club: York Barbell Club; Culver City Westside Barbell Club
- Team: National team
Medal record
Men's Weightlifting
Representing United States
World Championships
Silver medal – second place	1958 Stockholm	+90 kg
Pan American Games
Gold medal – first place	1959 Chicago	+90 kg
- Updated on August 7, 2017

David Carlyle Ashman (October 13, 1932 – July 20, 1984) was an American male weightlifter, who competed in the heavyweight class and represented the United States at international competitions.

He won the silver medal at the 1958 World Weightlifting Championships in the +90 kg category, losing to Russian Alexei Medvedev of the Soviet Union. Ashman, then 25, held a full-time job as an accountant in his hometown of Norwood, Massachusetts at the time.

Ashman later moved to York, Pennsylvania to train with the York Barbell Club and shortly after that to California to join the Culver City Westside Barbell Club. He won the gold medal at the 1959 Pan American Games. setting a Pan American Games super-heavy weight record of 1,047 pounds (475 kg) to defeat Humberto Selvetti of Argentina. He temporarily held the world record in both the snatch and clean-and-jerk category. He set the clean-and-jerk record of 444 pounds (201 kg) during an exhibition on May 14, 1960, at the Junior National AAU championships, breaking Soviet Yuri Vlasov's previous record by 8 lbs. The following month, he was named an alternate to the U.S. Olympic team.
