= 1958 World Weightlifting Championships =

International weightlifting competition

1958 Men's World Championships

The 1958 Men's World Weightlifting Championships were held in Stockholm, Sweden from September 16 to September 21, 1958. There were 96 men in action from 27 nations.

== Medal summary ==
Event	Gold		Silver		Bronze	
Bantamweight; 56 kg	Vladimir Stogov; Soviet Union	342.5 kg	Charles Vinci; United States	327.5 kg	Ali Safa-Sonboli; Iran	312.5 kg
Featherweight; 60 kg	Isaac Berger; United States	372.5 kg	Yevgeny Minayev; Soviet Union	362.5 kg	Sebastiano Mannironi; Italy	342.5 kg
Lightweight; 67.5 kg	Viktor Bushuev; Soviet Union	390.0 kg	Luciano De Genova; Italy	362.5 kg	Henrik Tamraz; Iran	357.5 kg
Middleweight; 75 kg	Tommy Kono; United States	430.0 kg	Fyodor Bogdanovsky; Soviet Union	422.5 kg	Marcel Paterni; France	395.0 kg
Light heavyweight 82.5 kg	Trofim Lomakin; Soviet Union	440.0 kg	Jim George; United States	435.0 kg	Ireneusz Paliński; Poland	432.5 kg
Middle heavyweight 90 kg	Arkady Vorobyov; Soviet Union	465.0 kg	Dave Sheppard; United States	450.0 kg	Ivan Veselinov; Bulgaria	422.5 kg
Heavyweight +90 kg	Aleksey Medvedev; Soviet Union	485.0 kg	Dave Ashman; United States	457.5 kg	Firouz Pojhan; Iran	455.0 kg

== Medal table ==
Rank	Nation	Gold	Silver	Bronze	Total
1	Soviet Union	5	2	0	7
2	United States	2	4	0	6
3	Italy	0	1	1	2
4	Iran	0	0	3	3
5	Bulgaria	0	0	1	1
5	France	0	0	1	1
5	Poland	0	0	1	1
Totals (7 entries)		7	7	7	21
