= Ezaria Ilkhanoff =

Iranian boxer (1934–2019)

Personal information
- Born: 3 July 1934 Moscow, Soviet Union
- Died: 3 September 2019 (aged 85) Windsor, Pennsylvania, U.S.
Medal record
Representing Iran
Men's boxing
Asian Games
Bronze medal – third place	1958 Tokyo	51 kg

Ezaria Ilkhanoff (3 July 1934 – 3 September 2019), also known as Ezrael Illkhanouf, was an Assyrian boxer, who became a member of Iran senior national Boxing team in 1955, and also a member of Tehran Taj Club, boxing in the 51 kg division. He participated as a member of the Iranian boxers at the 1958 Asian Games, in the Flyweight division, and also at the 1960 Summer Olympics, in the Flyweight division, and was also selected for the Flyweight division of the Iranian national boxing team, to participate in the 1962 Asian Games. In Tokyo 1958, Ilkhanoff won the bronze medal of the 51 kg boxing division, after losing on points to Hla Nyunt from Burma, in the semifinal.

Ilkhanoff died in Windsor, Pennsylvania on 3 September 2019, at the age of 85.
