= Ko Bu-beng =

Taiwanese weightlifter (born 1937)

Personal information
- Nationality: Taiwanese
- Born: 23 July 1937 (age 89) Manila, Philippines

Sport
- Sport: Weightlifting
Medal record
Representing Republic of China
Men's weightlifting
Asian Games
Gold medal – first place	1958 Tokyo	75 kg
Asian Championships
Gold medal – first place	1957 Tehran	75 kg

Ko Bu-beng (Chinese: 高武明; born 23 July 1937) is a Filipino-Taiwanese weightlifter. Growing up in the Philippines, he represented the Republic of China in international competition. He competed at the 1956 Summer Olympics and the 1960 Summer Olympics. He won gold medals at the 1957 Asian Weightlifting Championships and the 1958 Asian Games in the men's middleweight event.

== Biography ==
Ko Bu-beng was born on 23 July 1937 in Manila, Philippines, to parents hailing from Jinjiang, Fujian. Growing up in the Philippines, Ko studied at Chiang Kai-shek College.

For his weightlifting career, he was coached by Shi Wangbi. Ko was selected to compete for the Republic of China at the 1956 Summer Olympics held in Melbourne, Australia, for their debut appearance. He competed in the men's middleweight event for competitors that weighed 75 kilograms (165 lb) or less. There, he pressed 90 kilograms, snatched 100 kilograms, and clean and jerked 135 kilograms for a total of 325 kilograms. Overall, he placed 12th out of the 16 weightlifters that competed.

Ko then competed at the 1957 World Weightlifting Championships, which were held conjunctly with the 1957 Asian Weightlifting Championships, held in Tehran, Iran. He competed in the men's middleweight event and placed first in his event for the Asian Weightlifting Championships. The following year, he competed at the 1958 Asian Games held in Tokyo, Japan, as one of the five Filipino-Taiwanese weightlifters in the delegation. Ko competed in the men's middleweight event and pressed 110 kilograms, snatched 110 kilograms, and clean and jerked 160 kilograms for a total of 380 kilograms. He placed first overall and set a new Asian record for the total.

He also competed for the Republic of China at the 1960 Summer Olympics held in Rome, Italy, in the same event. There, he only managed to press 110 kilograms and snatch 105 kilograms, failing to register a total after failing all of his clean and jerk attempts.
