= Wrestling at the 1958 Asian Games – Men's freestyle +87 kg =

Wrestling event

Men's freestyle +87 kg at the 1958 Asian Games
- Venue: Korakuen Ice Palace
- Dates: 25–27 May 1958
- Competitors: 4 from 4 nations

Medalists
gold medal	Abbas Zandi	Iran
silver medal	Muhammad Nazir	Pakistan
bronze medal	Mitsuhiro Ohira	Japan

The men's freestyle +87 kilograms (heavyweight) freestyle wrestling competition at the 1958 Asian Games in Tokyo was held from 25 to 27 May 1958.

The competition used a form of negative points tournament, with negative points given for any result short of a fall. Accumulation of 6 negative points eliminated the wrestler. When three wrestlers remained, they advanced to a final round. These 3 wrestlers each faced each other in a round-robin (with earlier results counting, if any had wrestled another before); record within the medal round determined medals, with bad points breaking ties.

== Schedule ==
All times are Japan Standard Time (UTC+09:00)

Date	Time	Event
Sunday, 25 May 1958	11:00	First round
Monday, 26 May 1958	10:00	Second round
Tuesday, 27 May 1958	10:00	Third round

== Results ==
=== First round ===
TBM		BM		BM		TBM
4	Nizamuddin Subhani (AFG)	4	Fall 9:24	0	Muhammad Nazir (PAK)	0
3	Mitsuhiro Ohira (JPN)	3	Decision	1	Abbas Zandi (IRN)	1

=== Second round ===
TBM		BM		BM		TBM
8	Nizamuddin Subhani (AFG)	4	Fall 4:11	0	Mitsuhiro Ohira (JPN)	3
2	Muhammad Nazir (PAK)	2	Draw	2	Abbas Zandi (IRN)	3

=== Third round ===
TBM		BM		BM		TBM
4	Muhammad Nazir (PAK)	2	Draw	2	Mitsuhiro Ohira (JPN)	5
3	Abbas Zandi (IRN)				Bye	

== Final standing ==
Rank	Athlete	Round			TBM	FBM
Rank	Athlete	1	2	3	TBM	FBM
1st place, gold medalist(s)	Abbas Zandi (IRN)	1	2	Bye	3	3
2nd place, silver medalist(s)	Muhammad Nazir (PAK)	0	2	2	4	4
3rd place, bronze medalist(s)	Mitsuhiro Ohira (JPN)	3	0	2	5	5
4	Nizamuddin Subhani (AFG)	4	4		8	
