= Weightlifting at the 1956 Summer Olympics =

Weightlifting at the Games of the XVI Olympiad
- Venue: Royal Exhibition Building
- Dates: 23–26 November 1956
- Competitors: 105 from 34 nations

The weightlifting competition at the 1956 Summer Olympics in Melbourne consisted of seven weight classes, all for men only.

== Medal summary ==
Games	Gold	Silver	Bronze
Bantamweight	Charles Vinci; United States	Vladimir Stogov; Soviet Union	Mahmoud Namjoo; Iran
Featherweight	Isaac Berger; United States	Yevgeni Minaev; Soviet Union	Marian Zieliński; Poland
Lightweight	Igor Rybak; Soviet Union	Ravil Khabutdinov; Soviet Union	Kim Chang-Hee; South Korea
Middleweight	Fyodor Bogdanovsky; Soviet Union	Pete George; United States	Ermanno Pignatti; Italy
Light-heavyweight	Tommy Kono; United States	Vasili Stepanov; Soviet Union	James George; United States
Middle-heavyweight	Arkadi Vorobyev; Soviet Union	David Sheppard; United States	Jean Debuf; France
Heavyweight	Paul Anderson; United States	Humberto Selvetti; Argentina	Alberto Pigaiani; Italy

== Medal table ==
Rank	Nation	Gold	Silver	Bronze	Total
1	United States	4	2	1	7
2	Soviet Union	3	4	0	7
3	Argentina	0	1	0	1
4	Italy	0	0	2	2
5	France	0	0	1	1
5	Iran	0	0	1	1
5	Poland	0	0	1	1
5	South Korea	0	0	1	1
Totals (8 entries)		7	7	7	21

== Participating nations ==
- Argentina (2)
- Australia (7)
- Austria (2)
- Belgium (1)
- Brazil (2)
- Bulgaria (2)
- Burma (3)
- Canada (3)
- Republic of China (3)
- Colombia (2)
- Czechoslovakia (1)
- Finland (1)
- France (3)
- United Team of Germany (2)
- Great Britain (5)
- Guyana (2)
- India (3)
- Indonesia (1)
- Iran (7)
- Italy (4)
- Japan (5)
- South Korea (6)
- Malaya (3)
- Mexico (1)
- New Zealand (1)
- Pakistan (3)
- Philippines (2)
- Poland (5)
- Singapore (3)
- South Africa (3)
- Soviet Union (7)
- Sweden (1)
- Trinidad and Tobago (2)
- United States (7)

== Sources ==
- "Olympic Medal Winners". International Olympic Committee.
