= 1957 World Weightlifting Championships =

Weightlifting competition in Tehran

1957 Men's World Championships

The 1957 Men's World Weightlifting Championships were held in Tehran, Pahlavi Iran, from 8 November to 12 November 1957. There were 76 men in action from 21 nations.

== Medal summary ==
Event	Gold		Silver		Bronze	
Bantamweight; 56 kg	Vladimir Stogov; Soviet Union	345.0 kg	Ali Safa-Sonboli; Iran	327.5 kg	Mahmoud Namjoo; Iran	320.0 kg
Featherweight; 60 kg	Yevgeny Minayev; Soviet Union	362.5 kg	Sebastiano Mannironi; Italy	352.5 kg	Isaac Berger; United States	350.0 kg
Lightweight; 67.5 kg	Viktor Bushuev; Soviet Union	380.0 kg	Ivan Abadzhiev; Bulgaria	372.5 kg	Jan Czepułkowski; Poland	365.0 kg
Middleweight; 75 kg	Tommy Kono; United States	420.0 kg	Fyodor Bogdanovsky; Soviet Union	420.0 kg	Jan Bochenek; Poland	395.0 kg
Light heavyweight 82.5 kg	Trofim Lomakin; Soviet Union	450.0 kg	Jim George; United States	422.5 kg	Jalal Mansouri; Iran	412.5 kg
Middle heavyweight 90 kg	Arkady Vorobyov; Soviet Union	470.0 kg	Hassan Rahnavardi; Iran	440.0 kg	Firouz Pojhan; Iran	427.5 kg
Heavyweight +90 kg	Aleksey Medvedev; Soviet Union	500.0 kg	Humberto Selvetti; Argentina	485.0 kg	Alberto Pigaiani; Italy	452.5 kg

== Medal table ==
Rank	Nation	Gold	Silver	Bronze	Total
1	Soviet Union	6	1	0	7
2	United States	1	1	1	3
3	Iran	0	2	3	5
4	Italy	0	1	1	2
5	Argentina	0	1	0	1
5	Bulgaria	0	1	0	1
7	Poland	0	0	2	2
Totals (7 entries)		7	7	7	21
