= Tommy Kono =

American weightlifter (1930–2016)

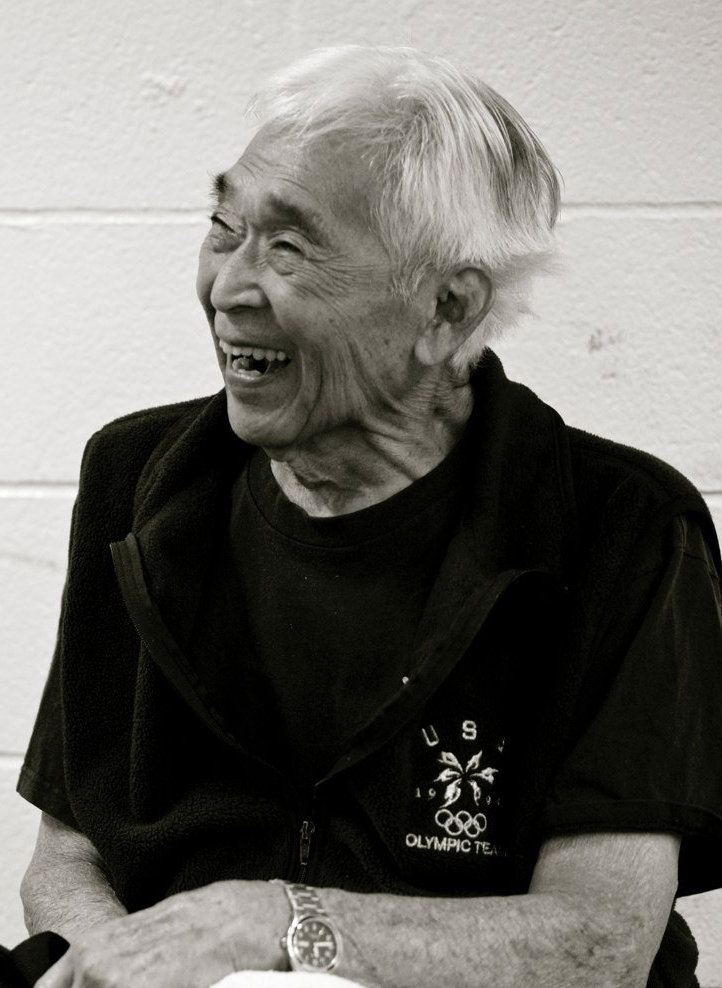
- Kono in 2015

Personal information
- Born: Tamio Kono; June 27, 1930 Sacramento, California, U.S.
- Died: April 24, 2016 (aged 85) Honolulu, Hawaii, U.S.
- Height: 167 cm (5 ft 6 in)
- Weight: 67–81 kg (148–179 lb)

Sport
- Country: United States
- Sport: Olympic weightlifting
- Events: Clean and press Clean and jerk Snatch
- Turned pro: 1952
- Retired: 1964
Medal record
Men's weightlifting
Representing the United States
Olympic Games
Gold medal – first place	1952 Helsinki	-67.5 kg
Gold medal – first place	1956 Melbourne	-82.5 kg
Silver medal – second place	1960 Rome	-75 kg
World Weightlifting Championships
Gold medal – first place	1953 Stockholm	-75kg
Gold medal – first place	1954 Vienna	-82.5 kg
Gold medal – first place	1955 Munich	-82.5 kg
Gold medal – first place	1957 Teheran	-75kg
Gold medal – first place	1958 Stockholm	-75kg
Gold medal – first place	1959 Warsaw	-75kg
Bronze medal – third place	1961 Vienna	-82.5 kg
Silver medal – second place	1962 Budapest	-82.5 kg
Pan American Games
Gold medal – first place	1955 Mexico City	-82.5 kg
Gold medal – first place	1959 Chicago	-75kg
Gold medal – first place	1963 São Paulo	-82.5 kg

Tamio "Tommy" Kono (Japanese: 高野 民夫, June 27, 1930 – April 24, 2016) was an American weightlifter of Japanese descent. A two-time Olympic gold medalist, Kono set world records in four different weight classes: lightweight (149 pounds or 67.5 kilograms), middleweight (165 lb or 75 kg), light-heavyweight (182 lb or 82.5 kg) and middle-heavyweight (198 lb or 90 kg).

== Early life ==
Kono was born in Sacramento, California, on June 27, 1930. His family was of Japanese descent and were interned at Tule Lake internment camp in 1942 during World War II following the signing of Executive Order 9066. Sickly as a child, the desert air helped Kono's asthma. It was during the relocation that Kono was introduced to weightlifting by neighbors including Noboru "Dave" Shimoda, a member of the Tule Lake weightlifting and bodybuilding club and brother of actor Yuki Shimoda and his friends, Gotoh, Toda and Bob Nakanishi. After 3 1/2 years they were released and Kono finished Sacramento High School. He later worked for the California Department of Motor Vehicles and attended Sacramento Junior College.

Kono was drafted into the U.S. Army in 1950 as a cook but remained in the United States during the Korean War after officials learned of his Olympic potential. As a private, he was first sent to Camp Stoneman, then reassigned to Fort Mason in San Francisco, California.

== Career ==
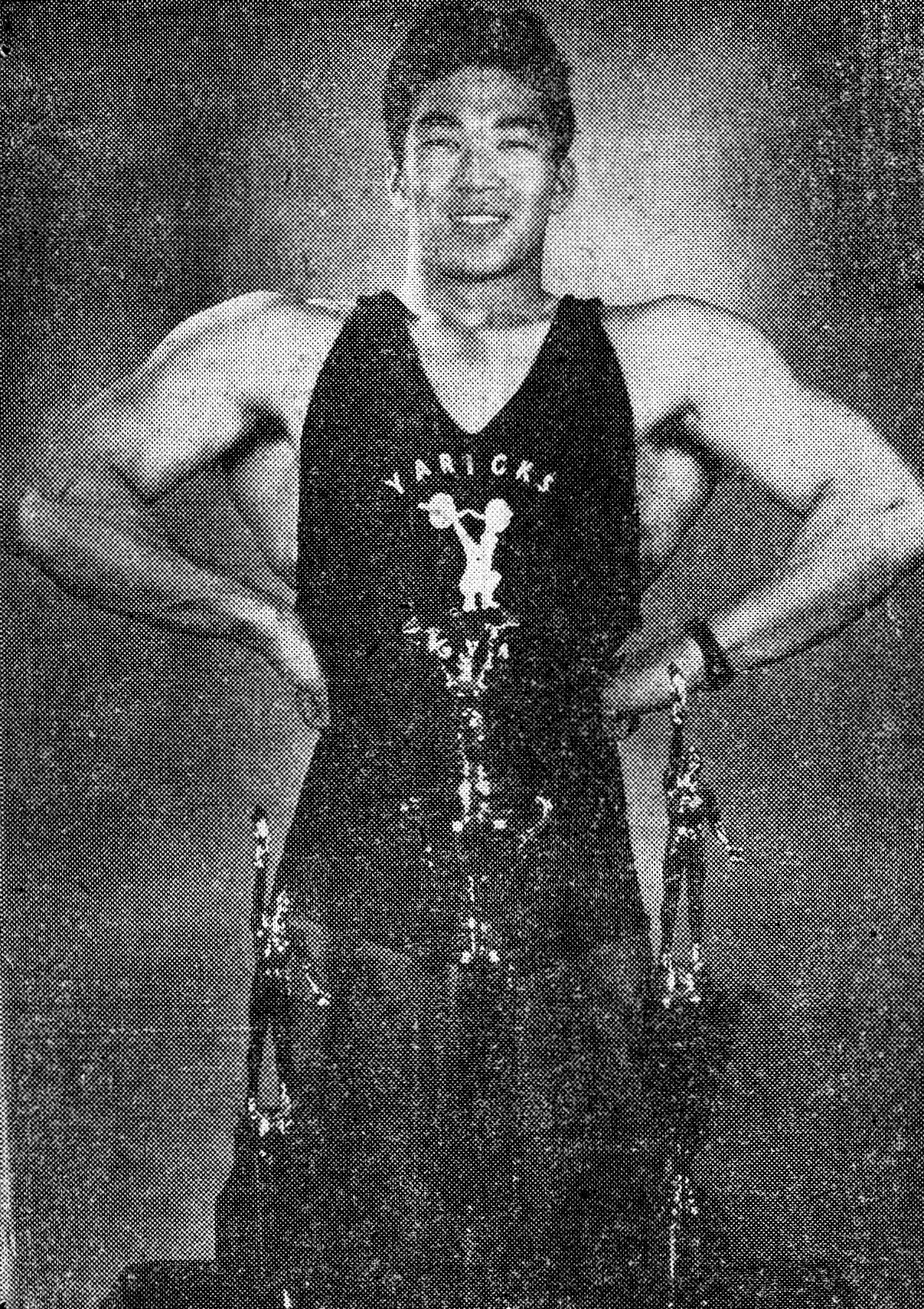
Kono, circa 1952

Kono was a gold medalist at both the 1952 Summer Olympics and 1956 Summer Olympics, and a silver medalist at the 1960 Summer Olympics under coach Bob Hoffman. Kono won the World Weightlifting Championships six consecutive times from 1953 to 1959 and was a three-time Pan American Games champion; in 1955, 1959, and 1963. A knee injury prevented him from qualifying for the 1964 Summer Olympics in Tokyo and the following year he retired from the sport. He set a total of 26 world records and seven Olympic records, making him the most accomplished U.S. male weightlifter to date.

Kono was also a successful bodybuilder, winning the Fédération Internationale Haltérophile et Culturiste Mr. Universe titles in 1954, 1955, 1957 and 1961. After his retirement he turned to coaching, taking on the Mexican 1968 and West German 1972 Summer Olympics weightlifting teams before becoming head coach of the United States' Olympic weightlifting team at the 1976 Summer Olympics.

During his weightlifting career in the 1960s, he developed a pair of bands to support knees during training. These eventually extended to the elbows and became standard weightlifting equipment. While he was coaching in West Germany during the 1970s, his correspondence with Adidas led to the firm's development of low cut weightlifting shoes.

== Awards ==
Along with his weightlifting and bodybuilding titles, Kono was an eight-time AAU James E. Sullivan Award finalist, an award given annually to the top American amateur athlete. He was also one of the first members of the Hawaii Sports Hall of Fame in 1978. In 1990, Kono received the Association of Oldetime Barbell and Strongmen Highest Achievement Award and was inducted into the United States Olympic Hall of Fame. He was elected to the International Weightlifting Federation Hall of Fame in 1993. In 2005, the International Weightlifting Federation named Kono the "Lifter of the Century."

== Portrayals ==
Kono appeared in Universal Newsreel volume 32, number 63, August 6, 1959. He is depicted as part of a mural located at 37 West Philadelphia Street in York, Pennsylvania. This mural was finished in 2000.

Kono's life was featured in the documentary:"Arnold Knows Me: The Tommy Kono Story" that was released in the summer of 2016. The film first aired on KVIE (PBS) Sacramento and went on to air in more than 50 (PBS-affiliate) markets across the country.

Kono was depicted in a Google Doodle marking the anniversary of his birth in 2021.

== Death ==
Kono died on April 24, 2016, in Honolulu, Hawaii from complications of liver disease, aged 85. Survivors included his wife of 53 years, the former Florence Rodrigues of Honolulu, three children, and three grandchildren.
