= Shigeo Kogure =

Japanese weightlifter (1935–2009)

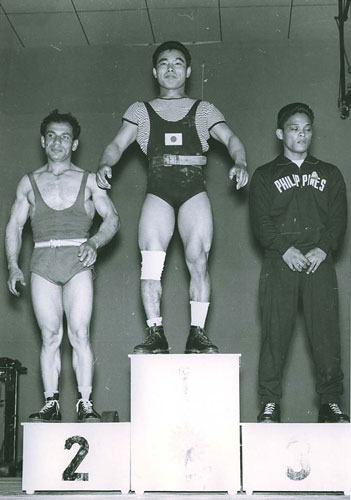
- Kogure (center) at the 1958 Asian Games

Personal information
- Born: October 3, 1935 Tochigi Prefecture, Japan
- Died: October 13, 2009 (aged 74) Nishinomiya, Japan
- Height: 158 cm (5 ft 2 in)
- Weight: 56 kg (123 lb)

Sport
- Sport: Weightlifting
Medal record
Representing Japan
Asian Games
Gold medal – first place	1958 Tokyo	-56 kg

Shigeo Kogure (木暮 茂夫, October 3, 1935 – October 13, 2009) was a Japanese bantamweight weightlifter who won a gold medal at the 1958 Asian Games and placed fourth at the 1960 Summer Olympics, both held in Tokyo.
