= Windsor, Pennsylvania =

Borough in Pennsylvania, US

- Borough
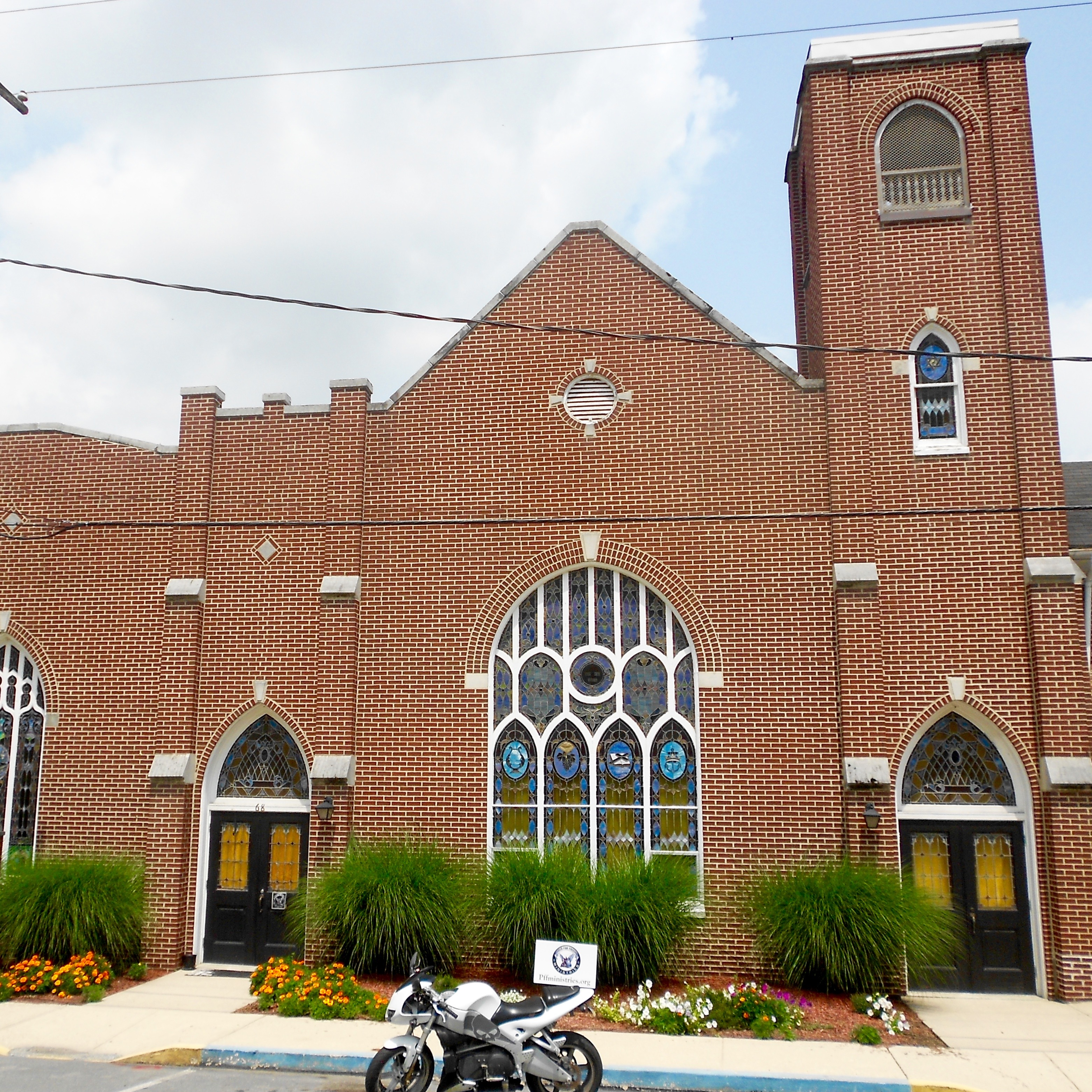
- Church on Main St. (SR 624)

- Location in York County and the U.S. state of Pennsylvania.

- Location of Windsor in Pennsylvania Windsor (the United States)
- Coordinates: 39°54′56″N 76°34′59″W
- Country: United States
- State: Pennsylvania
- County: York
- Settled: 1830
- Incorporated: 1905

Government
  - Type: Borough Council

Area
  - Total: 0.55 sq mi (1.42 km^{2})
  - Land: 0.55 sq mi (1.42 km^{2})
  - Water: 0 sq mi (0.00 km^{2})
- Elevation: 725 ft (221 m)

Population (2020)
  - Total: 1,359 ▲
  - Estimate (2021): 1,356
  - Density: 2,708.0/sq mi (1,045.55/km^{2})
- Time zone: UTC-5 (Eastern (EST))
  - Summer (DST): UTC-4 (EDT)
- Zip code: 17366
- Area code: 717
- FIPS code: 42-85728
- Website: https://www.windsorboropa.com/

Windsor is a borough in York County, Pennsylvania, United States. The population was 1,359 at the 2020 census. It was established in 1905 as Windsorville and was named after Windsor, England. It is part of the York–Hanover metropolitan area.

== Geography ==
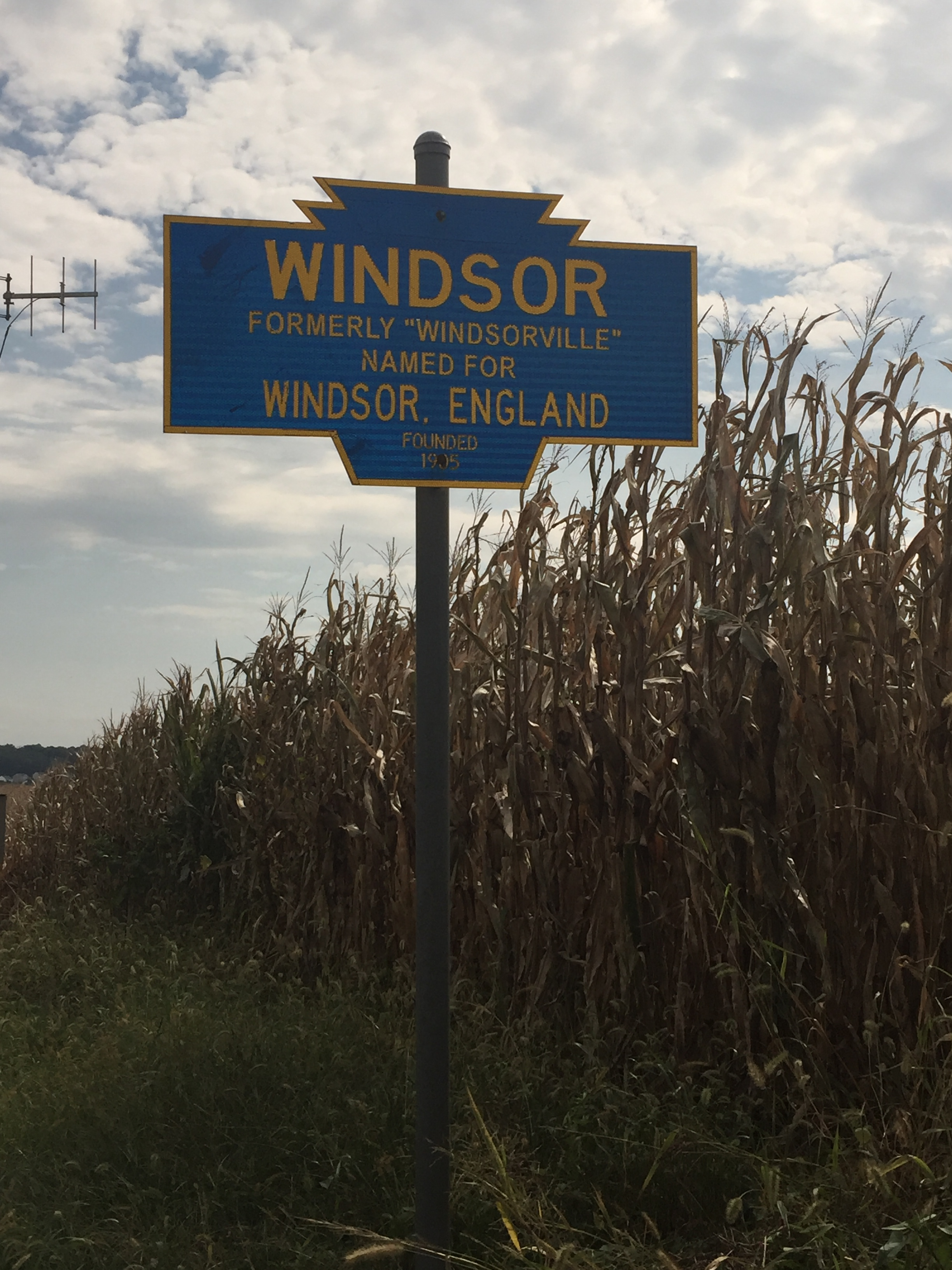
Windsor town sign

Windsor is located at 39°54′56″N 76°34′59″W (39.915577, -76.582973).

According to the United States Census Bureau, the borough has a total area of 0.5 square miles (1.3 km^{2}), all land.

== Demographics ==
Historical population
Census	Pop.	Note	%±
1910	697		—
1920	854		22.5%
1930	1,009		18.1%
1940	1,108		9.8%
1950	1,126		1.6%
1960	1,029		−8.6%
1970	1,298		26.1%
1980	1,205		−7.2%
1990	1,355		12.4%
2000	1,331		−1.8%
2010	1,319		−0.9%
2020	1,358		3.0%
2021 (est.)	1,356	▼	−0.1%

As of the census of 2000, there were 1,331 people, 484 households, and 359 families residing in the borough. The population density was 2,676.3 inhabitants per square mile (1,033.3/km^{2}). There were 525 housing units at an average density of 1,055.7 per square mile (407.6/km^{2}). The racial makeup of the borough was 98.57% White, 0.53% African American, 0.08% Native American, 0.23% Asian, 0.15% from other races, and 0.45% from two or more races. Hispanic or Latino of any race were 0.60% of the population.

There were 484 households, out of which 44.2% had children under the age of 18 living with them, 52.3% were married couples living together, 14.7% had a female householder with no husband present, and 25.8% were non-families. 18.8% of all households were made up of individuals, and 8.7% had someone living alone who was 65 years of age or older. The average household size was 2.74 and the average family size was 3.09.

In the borough the population was spread out, with 31.4% under the age of 18, 9.5% from 18 to 24, 33.2% from 25 to 44, 16.5% from 45 to 64, and 9.3% who were 65 years of age or older. The median age was 31 years. For every 100 females there were 92.3 males. For every 100 females age 18 and over, there were 89.8 males.

The median income for a household in the borough was $37,000, and the median income for a family was $40,057. Males had a median income of $30,492 versus $20,912 for females. The per capita income for the borough was $15,808. About 6.5% of families and 7.8% of the population were below the poverty line, including 7.7% of those under age 18 and 11.2% of those age 65 or over.

== Attractions ==
The Early American Steam Engine Society hosts its annual Steam-O-Rama in Windsor. Steam-O-Rama is a steam and gas engine show consisting of tractor pulls, tractor square dancing, kiddie rides, games and horse pulls. It typically starts the first Thursday of the first weekend in October. Local bluegrass bands play music on Thursday nights, and admission is free. Many different food vendors attend and there is an affordable family flea market. Steam-O-Rama has been hosted in Windsor for more than one-hundred years.
