= Vazik Kazarian =

Iranian boxer (born 1937)

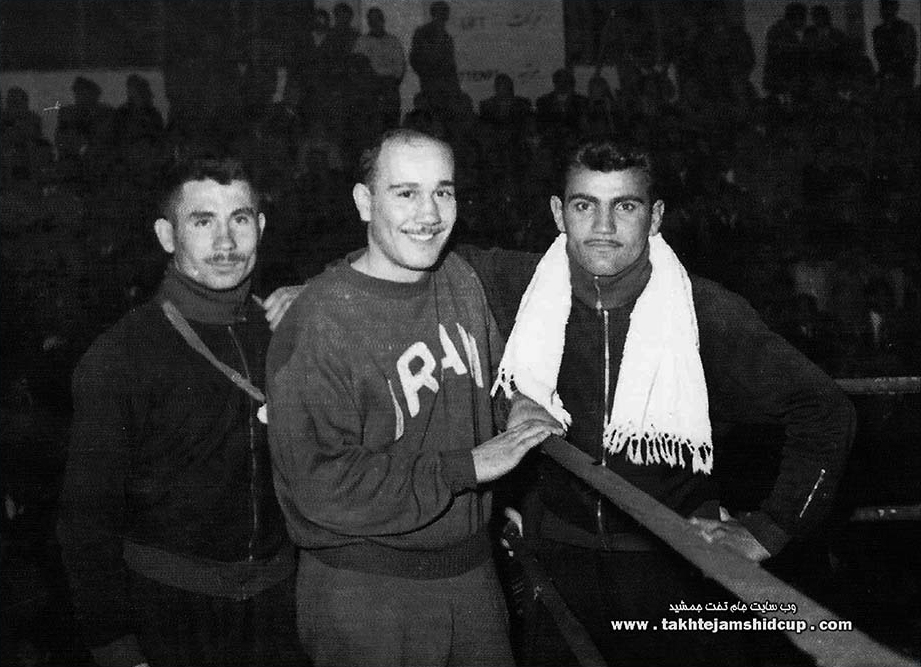
- Vazik Kazarian, Petrol Nazabgian, Sadegh Ali Akbarzadeh (right to left)

Personal information
- Born: 4 May 1937 (age 89) Bahmanshir, Khuzestan

Sport
- Sport: Boxing
Medal record
Representing Iran
Men's boxing
Asian Games
Silver medal – second place	1958 Tokyo	63.5 kg

Vazik Kazarian aka Vazik Ghazarian (Armenian: Վազիկ Ղազարեան; Persian: وازیک قازاریان, born 4 May 1937 Bahmanshir, Khuzestan, Iran) was an Iranian Armenian boxer who became a member of Iran senior national Boxing team in 1956, and was also a member of Tehran Taj Club. He participated as a member of the Iranian boxers at the 1958 Asian Games, in the Light-welterweight division, and also at the 1960 Summer Olympics, in the Light-welterweight division. In Tokyo 1958, Kazarian reached the final of the Light-welterweight division after defeating Sueb Chundakowsolaya from Thailand, on points in the semifinal, and eventually won the silver medal of the 63.5 kg boxing division, after losing on points to Shigemasa Kawakami from Japan in the final. He retired from championship boxing and the Iranian national boxing team, after returning from the 1960 Summer Olympics.

== 1960 Olympic results ==
Below is the record of Vazik Kazarian, an Iranian light welterweight boxer who competed at the 1960 Rome Olympics:

- Round of 64: bye
- Round of 32: lost to Bobby Kelsey (Great Britain) by decision, 2-3
