= Sadegh Aliakbarzadeh =

Iranian boxer

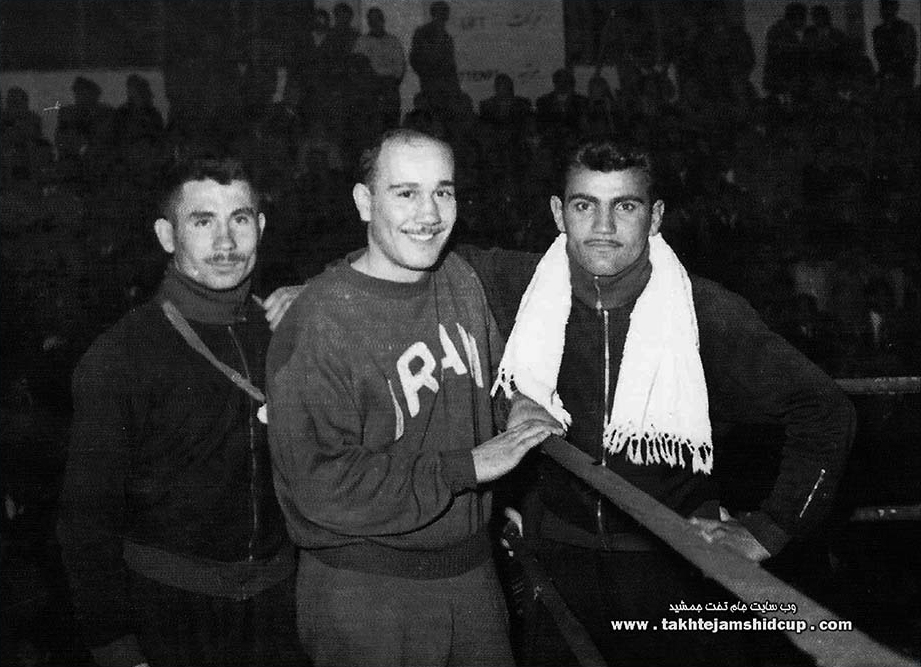
Sadegh Aliakbarzadeh (left)

Sadegh Aliakbarzadeh Khoi (Persian: صادق علی اکبرزاده خویی, born September 3, 1932, in Soviet Union - died 2007), was an Iranian boxer who became a member of Iran senior national Boxing team in 1957, and was also a member of Tehran Jafari Club, boxing in the 54 and 57 kg divisions. He participated as a member of the Iranian boxers at the 1958 Asian Games, in the Featherweight division, and also at the 1960 Summer Olympics, and the 1964 Summer Olympics, in the Bantamweight division, and was also selected for the Bantamweight division of the Iranian national boxing team, to participate in the 1962 Asian Games. In Tokyo 1958, Aliakbarzadeh obtained the fifth place of the 57 kg boxing division, after losing on points to Isami Ikeyama, from Japan, the eventual gold medal winner of the division, in the quarterfinal.

== 1960 Olympic results ==
Below is the record of Sadegh Aliakbarzadeh, an Iranian bantamweight boxer who competed at the 1960 Rome Olympics:

- Round of 64: bye
- Round of 32: lost to Muhammad Nasir (Pakistan) by decision, 1-4
