= Esmaeil Elmkhah =

Iranian weightlifter (1936–1988)

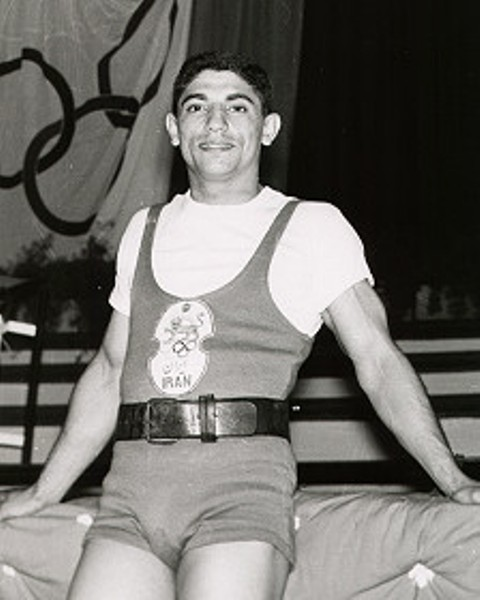

Personal information
- Born: 30 December 1936 Rasht, Imperial State of Iran
- Died: 1988 (aged 51–52)
- Height: 160 cm (5 ft 3 in)

Sport
- Sport: Weightlifting
Medal record
Representing Iran
Olympic Games
Bronze medal – third place	1960 Rome	56 kg
Asian Games
Silver medal – second place	1958 Tokyo	52 kg

Esmaeil Elmkhah (Persian: اسماعیل علم‌خواه, 30 December 1936 – 1988) was an Iranian featherweight weightlifter. In 1958 he won a silver medal at the Asian Games and set four unofficial world records: one in the snatch, one in the press and two in the total. He later won a bronze medal at the 1960 Olympics.

Elmkhah was born in Rasht, but grew up in Tehran. He had a sister, and lost his parents when he was a child.
