= Park Dong-cheol =

South Korean weightlifter (1930–2023)

Personal information
- Nationality: South Korean
- Born: 1930
- Died: 7 October 2023 (aged 92–93)

Sport
- Sport: Weightlifting

Park Dong-cheol (1930 – 7 October 2023) was a South Korean weightlifter. He competed in the men's middle heavyweight event at the 1956 Summer Olympics. Park died on 7 October 2023.
