= Ghasem Amiryavari =

Iranian boxer (1931–2020)

Personal information
- Native name: قاسم امیریاوری
- Full name: Ghasem Amir-Yavarkandi
- Born: 5 December 1931 Tehran, Iran
- Died: 10 November 2020 (aged 88)
Medal record
Representing Iran
Men's boxing
Asian Games
Silver medal – second place	1958 Tokyo	71 kg

Ghasem Amir-Yavarkandi (Persian: قاسم امیر یاورکندی; 5 December 1931 – 10 November 2020) also known as Ghasem Amiryavari, was a member of the Iranian senior national boxing team. Yavari joined the "Niroo va Rasti" (Persian: نیرو و راستی; lit. Power and Virtue) Club in 1947 at the age of sixteen, where he started his boxing career and became a member of "Jafari" Club (Persian: جعفری) later on, where he stayed until 1962 which was the end of his national boxing championship career.

== Boxing career ==
Yavari, a member of Tehran's Jafari Club, boxing in the 67 and 71 kg divisions, was selected to train with the Iran national boxing team to participate at the 1948 Summer Olympics, for the first time, as a reserve boxer, making his national-team debut. He acted as team captain of the Iranian boxers at the 1958 Asian Games in the light-middleweight division. Yavari won the silver medal in the 71 kg boxing division after losing on points to Osamu Takahashi from Japan in the final. Yavari was selected as Iranian captain during the 1960 Summer Olympics, where he competed in the welterweight division. Yavari was also selected in the light-middleweight division of the senior Iranian national boxing team for Jakarta, Indonesia, 1962 Asian Games, succeeding in Iran national championship matches held in Tehran, after defeating his opponents. After Iran National Olympic Committee (N.O.C.IRAN) decided not to participate in the games, with any sports team, mentioning lack of adequate national budget, Yavari retired from championship boxing and the Iranian national boxing team in 1962, passing on the national boxing team captaincy armband to Hassan Pakandam.

== Personal ==
Yavari was born in Tehran, Iran, and lived in "Mokhbereddoleh" (Persian: مخبرالدوله), Tehran, where he started his boxing career. He married in 1963 and had three sons from his marriage.
