= Jalal Mansouri =

Iranian weightlifter (1930–2012)

Personal information
- Full name: Mirjalal Ghaffarzadeh Mansour
- Nationality: Iranian
- Born: 10 January 1930
- Died: 11 November 2012 (aged 82) Tehran, Iran

Sport
- Sport: Weightlifting
Medal record
Representing Iran
World Championships
Bronze medal – third place	1957 Tehran	82.5 kg
Asian Games
Gold medal – first place	1958 Tokyo	82.5 kg
Silver medal – second place	1951 New Delhi	75 kg

Mirjalal Ghaffarzadeh Mansour (Persian: میرجلال غفارزاده منصور, 10 January 1930 – 11 November 2012) more known as Jalal Mansouri (Persian: جلال منصوری) was an Iranian weightlifter. He competed at the 1952 Summer Olympics and the 1956 Summer Olympics.
