= Minoru Kubota =

Japanese weightlifter (1930–2017)

Personal information
- Nationality: Japanese
- Born: 29 April 1930; Kurashiki, Japan
- Died: 20 August 2017 (aged 87)

Sport
- Sport: Weightlifting

Minoru Kubota (29 April 1930 – 20 August 2017) was a Japanese weightlifter. He competed in the men's light heavyweight event at the 1960 Summer Olympics. Kubota died on 20 August 2017, at the age of 87.
