= Akbar Khojini =

Iranian boxer (1935–1995)

Personal information
- Born: 1935
- Died: 1995

Sport
- Sport: Boxing
Medal record
Men's boxing
Asian Games
Bronze medal – third place	1958 Tokyo	81 kg
Asian Amateur Boxing Championships
Silver medal – second place	1963 Bangkok	81 kg

Akbar Khojini (Persian: اکبر خوجینی, 1995-1935 Bandar-e Anzali), was an Iranian boxer who became a member of Iran senior national Boxing team in 1956, and was also a member of Tehran Jafari Club, boxing in the 81 kg division. He participated as a member of the Iranian boxers at the 1958 Asian Games, in the Light Heavyweight division, and also at the Asian Amateur Boxing Championships in Bangkok, Thailand in 1963, in which he won the silver medal of the 81 kg boxing division, after losing to Ali Barkat from Pakistan, in the final. Khojini was also selected for the Light Heavyweight division of the Iranian national boxing team, to participate in the 1962 Asian Games. In Tokyo 1958, Khojini lost to Sultan Mahmoud from Pakistan, in the quarterfinal, and won the bronze medal of the 81 kg boxing division. Khojini retired from championship boxing and the Iranian national boxing team, after returning from the 1963 Asian Amateur Boxing Championships in Bangkok.
