= Ebrahim Peiravi =

Iranian weightlifter

Personal information
- Born: 14 April 1933 (age 93)

Sport
- Sport: Weightlifting
Medal record
Representing Iran
Asian Games
Silver medal – second place	1958 Tokyo	75 kg

Ebrahim Peiravi (Persian: ابراهیم پیروی, born 14 April 1933) is a retired Iranian middleweight weightlifter. He won silver medals at the 1958 Asian Games, He also participated at the 1956 Summer Olympics.
