= Mahmoud Namjoo =

Iranian weightlifter (1918–1989)

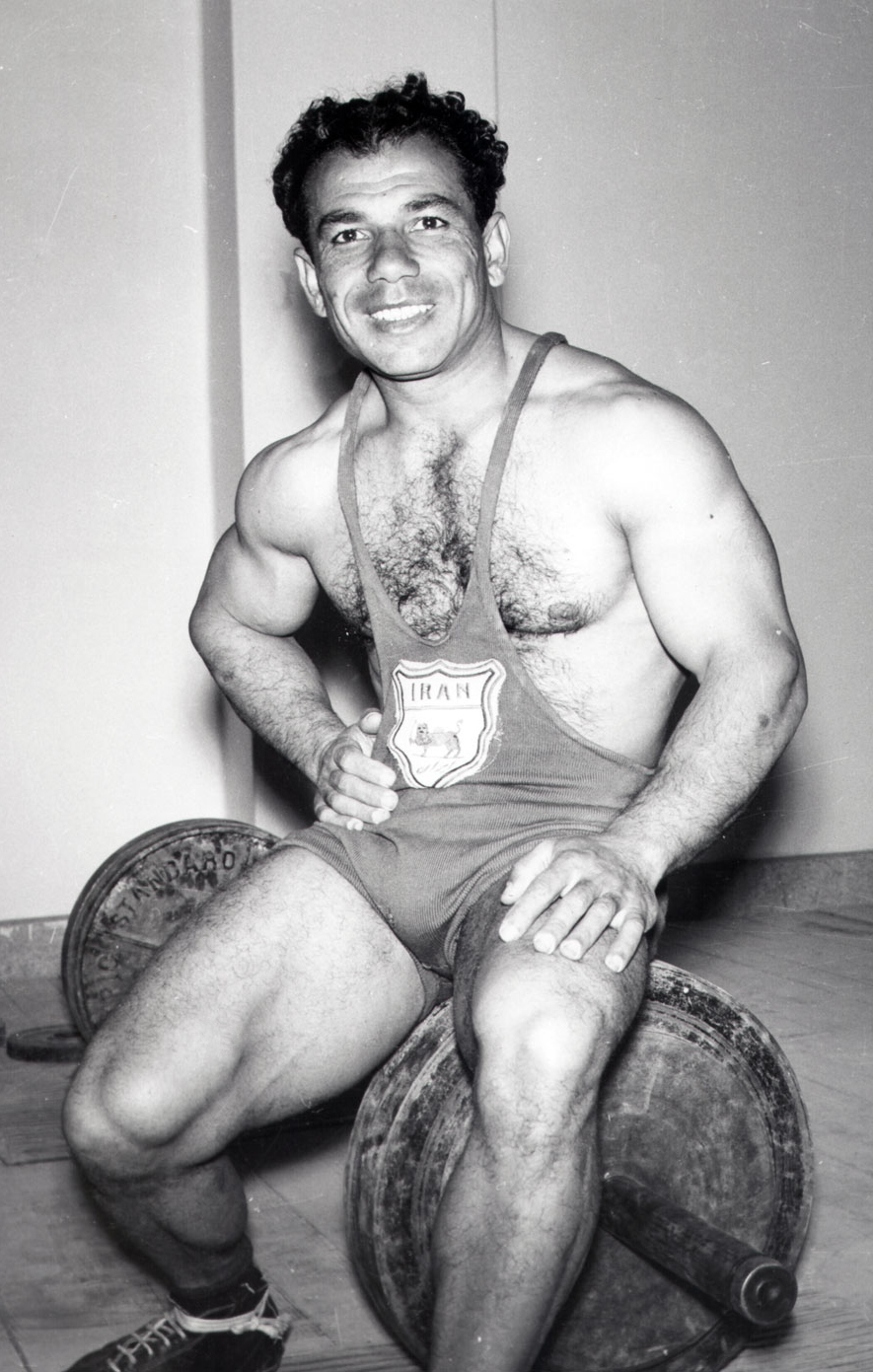
- Namjoo in the 1950s

Personal information
- Born: September 22, 1918 Rasht, Sublime State of Iran
- Died: January 21, 1989 (aged 70) Tehran, Iran

Sport
- Sport: Weightlifting
Medal record
Representing Iran
Olympic Games
Silver medal – second place	1952 Helsinki	56 kg
Bronze medal – third place	1956 Melbourne	56 kg
World Championships
Gold medal – first place	1949 Scheveningen	56 kg
Gold medal – first place	1950 Paris	56 kg
Gold medal – first place	1951 Milan	56 kg
Silver medal – second place	1954 Vienna	56 kg
Bronze medal – third place	1955 Munich	56 kg
Bronze medal – third place	1957 Tehran	56 kg
Asian Games
Gold medal – first place	1951 New Delhi	56 kg
Silver medal – second place	1958 Tokyo	56 kg

Mahmoud Namjoo (Persian: محمود نامجو, September 22, 1918 – January 21, 1989) was an Iranian bantamweight weightlifter. He competed at the 1948, 1952 and 1956 Olympics and placed fifth, second and third, respectively. At the world championships he won three gold, one silver and two bronze medals between 1949 and 1957, becoming the first Iranian weightlifter to win a world title. Namjoo was also the first Asian weightlifter to set a world record; during his career he set four: one in clean and jerk in 1949 and three in the total, in 1948, 1949 and 1951.

Namjoo was born in Rasht in 1918 and in 1937 moved to Tehran, where he worked at a carpentry workshop. He took weightlifting in a gym nearby. Besides weightlifting he also competed in bodybuilding, and won the Mr. Universe title in his weight division in 1948, placing fifth in 1955. In 1956, he spent two months working as a weightlifting coach in Turkey. He continued training in his forties and unsuccessfully tried to qualify for the 1960 Olympics. He died of pancreatic cancer aged 70.

Olympic Games
Preceded by Mostafa Baharmast	Flagbearer for Iran; Helsinki 1952	Succeeded by Mahmoud Namjoo

Olympic Games
Preceded by Mahmoud Namjoo	Flagbearer for Iran; Melbourne 1956	Succeeded by Jafar Salmasi
