= Lee Taik-yong =

South Korean weightlifter (born 1930)

Personal information
- Nationality: South Korean
- Born: 26 June 1930 (age 94); Seoul, South Korea

Sport
- Sport: Weightlifting

Lee Taik-yong (born 26 June 1930) is a South Korean weightlifter. He competed in the men's lightweight event at the 1960 Summer Olympics.
