= Firouz Pojhan =

Iranian weightlifter (1926–1996)

Medal record

Representing Iran

Men's weightlifting

World Championships
Bronze medal – third place	1951 Milan	90 kg
Bronze medal – third place	1957 Tehran	90 kg
Bronze medal – third place	1958 Stockholm	+90 kg

Asian Games
Gold medal – first place	1951 New Delhi	75 kg
Gold medal – first place	1958 Tokyo	+90 kg

Firouz Pojhan (Persian: فيروز پژهان; October 3, 1926 – 1996) was an Iranian weightlifter who was a member of Iran senior national weightlifting team. He participated at the 1951 and 1958 Asian Games, in which he won the gold medal of both events in his division, and the 1951, 1957 and 1958 World Weightlifting Championships, in which he won the bronze medal of all events in his division. He also competed in the 1952 and 1956 Summer Olympics.
