= Emam-Ali Habibi =

Iranian freestyle wrestler (1931–2025)

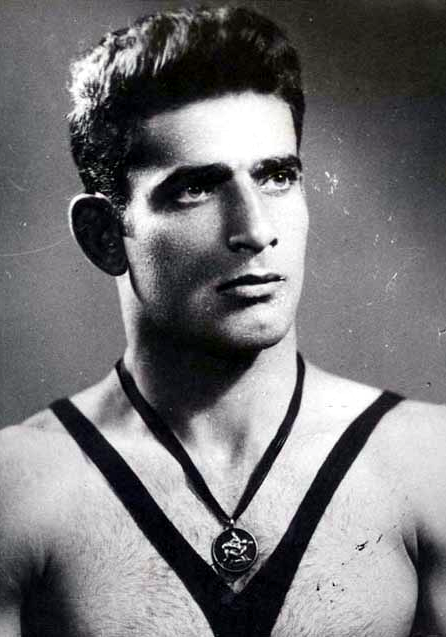
- Habibi in the 1950s

Personal information
- Native name: امامعلی حبیبی
- Full name: Emam-Ali Habibi Goudarzi
- Nickname: The Tiger of Mazandaran (ببر مازندران)
- Nationality: Iranian
- Born: 1931 Babol, Persia
- Died: 24 August 2025 (aged 94) Sari, Iran
- Height: 172 cm (5 ft 8 in)

Sport
- Sport: Freestyle wrestling
Medal record
Representing Iran
Olympic Games
Gold medal – first place	1956 Melbourne	67 kg
World Championships
Gold medal – first place	1959 Tehran	73 kg
Gold medal – first place	1961 Yokohama	73 kg
Gold medal – first place	1962 Toledo	78 kg
Asian Games
Gold medal – first place	1958 Tokyo	67 kg

Emam-Ali Habibi Goudarzi (Persian: امامعلی حبیبی گودرزی, 1931 – 24 August 2025) was an Iranian freestyle wrestler. He won gold medals at the 1958 Asian Games; 1959, 1961 and 1962 world championships; and 1956 Olympics, placing fourth in 1960. In 2007 he was inducted into the FILA Hall of Fame. Habibi was the fourth and the last son in a large family. He lost his father at the age of 12.

== Biography ==
Habibi was born in Babol, Persia in 1931. His legacy apart from his gold medals is the moves he introduced to wrestling such as the cradle, Habibi move, and fireman's carry. In interview with manoto TV he claimed that he only beat wrestlers with Iranian moves and his own invented moves. He also said in his time era matches were 12 minutes long and he disproved of the current way of wrestling with push outs. He was also part of many movies and became an Iranian congressman when Iran was under the Shah. He said he retired in his interview with manoto because he got 5 gold medals and beat anyone that faced him (even though he lost to Doug Blubaugh he beat another wrestler that had beaten him a year later which he saw as the equivalent, in the interview he also claimed he lost to Doug because his body was cramping and he was sick before the match and he couldn't get up halfway through so the ref called the match over). Habibi has 5 children and many grandchildren, all residing in the United States. He was one of the most dominant wrestlers in the history of the sport and changed the sport forever inspiring many Iranians into wrestling. Habibi also said that he liked people like Rasoul Khadem in an interview and said people like him should lead the nation into the future. He was also upset that when he retired no one from the federation sent him a letter to come and coach or teach his moves. He said that he was too Iranian and many other countries had asked him but he would never sell out his country or the happiness of the Iranian people. His nickname Babr Mazandaran came after a fan from Sari called him this name in a match in the world championships of Tehran as he looked like a Tiger on the mat (Babr in Persian).

Habibi died in Sari, Iran on 24 August 2025, at the age of 94.
