= Nicolas Arcales =

Filipino wrestler (born 1915)

Personal information
- Nationality: Filipino
- Born: 11 February 1915

Sport
- Sport: Wrestling

Nicolas Arcales (born 11 February 1915) was a Filipino wrestler. He competed in the men's freestyle middleweight at the 1956 Summer Olympics.
