= Singapore at the 1958 Asian Games =

- IOC code: SIN
- NOC: Singapore National Olympic Council

in Tokyo
- Competitors: 54
- Medals Ranked 10th: Gold 1 Silver 1 Bronze 1 Total 3

Asian Games appearances (overview)
- 1951; 1954; 1958; 1962; 1966; 1970; 1974; 1978; 1982; 1986; 1990; 1994; 1998; 2002; 2006; 2010; 2014; 2018; 2022; 2026

Singapore participated in the 1958 Asian Games held in Tokyo, Japan from May 24 to June 1, 1958. The country ranked 11th with a gold, silver, and bronze medal.

== Medalists ==
Medal	Name	Sport	Event
Gold	Tan Howe Liang	Weightlifting	Men's lightweight (67.5 kg)
Silver	Lionel Chee; Gan Eng Guan; Gan Eng Teck; Andrew Lim; Barry Mitchell; Derek Mitchell; Tan Eng Bock; Tan Eng Liang; Thio Gim Hock; Eric Yeo	Water polo	Men's Team
Bronze	Austin Dunsford	Boxing	Men's Featherweight (57 kg)

== Medal summary ==
=== Medal table ===
Sport	Gold	Silver	Bronze	Total
Weightlifting	1	0	0	1
Water polo	0	1	0	1
Boxing	0	0	1	1
Totals (3 entries)	1	1	1	3

== Weightlifting ==
=== Men's ===
Athlete	Event	Clean & Press		Snatch		Clean & Jerk		Total	Result
Athlete	Event	Result	Rank	Result	Rank	Result	Rank	Total	Result
Ow Fook Seng	Men's 52 kg	85.0	2	75.0	7	105.0	3	265.0	5
Chua Phung Kim	Men's 56 kg	87.5	5	90.0	5	~~117.5~~	—N/a	NM	DNF
Tan Ser Cher	Men's 60 kg	100.0	4	92.5	5	132.5	2	325.0	4
Tan Howe Liang	Men's 67.5 kg	110.0	4	112.5	1	152.5	1	375.0	1st place, gold medalist(s)
