= Muhammad Nasir =

Pakistani boxer (born 1937)

Personal information
- Nationality: Pakistani
- Born: 28 March 1937 (age 88); Khandowa, Pakistan

Sport
- Sport: Boxing

Muhammad Nasir (born 28 March 1937) is a Pakistani former boxer. He competed in the men's bantamweight event at the 1960 Summer Olympics and reached the Round of 16.
