= Bait Hussain =

Pakistani boxer (born 1933)

Personal information
- Nationality: Pakistani
- Born: 1933 (age 91–92)

Sport
- Sport: Boxing

Bait Hussain (born 1933) is a Pakistani former boxer. He competed in the men's welterweight event at the 1956 Summer Olympics.
