= Nabi Sorouri =

Iranian wrestler (1933–2002)

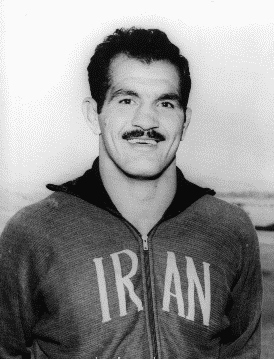

Personal information
- Native name: نبى الله سرورى
- Born: 1933 Baku, Azerbaijan
- Died: 2002 (aged 69) Tehran, Iran

Sport
- Sport: Freestyle wrestling
Medal record
Representing Iran
World Championships
Gold medal – first place	1957 Istanbul	79 kg
Asian Games
Silver medal – second place	1958 Tokyo	79 kg

Nabiollah "Nabi" Sorouri (1933–2002) was an Iranian welterweight freestyle wrestler. He was a member of the national team between 1953 and 1960. He won gold medal at the world championships in 1957 and placed fourth at the 1956 Summer Olympics. At the 1965 FILA Wrestling World Championships Sorouri was the head coach of Iran national wrestling team.
