= Takashi Nagai (wrestler) =

Japanese wrestler (born 1936)

Takashi Nagai (born 19 October 1936) is a Japanese former wrestler who competed in the 1960 Summer Olympics.
