= Ali Safa-Sonboli =

Iranian weightlifter (1932–2002)

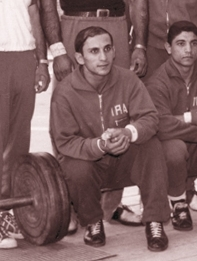
- Safa-Sonboli in 1960

Personal information
- Born: November 20, 1932 Qaem Shahr, Iran
- Died: 2002 (aged 69–70) Iran
- Height: 165 cm (5 ft 5 in)

Sport
- Sport: Weightlifting
Medal record
Representing Iran
World Championships
Silver medal – second place	1957 Tehran	56 kg
Bronze medal – third place	1958 Stockholm	56 kg
Asian Games
Silver medal – second place	1958 Tokyo	60 kg

Ali Safa-Sonboli (Persian: على صفا سنبلى, November 20, 1932 – 2002) was an Iranian weightlifter. He won silver medals at the 1957 Asian Games in Tehran Breaking the then existing National Iranian weightlifters records by over 7 Kg ( 357.5 Kg ). The 1958 Men's World Weightlifting Championships were held in Stockholm, Sweden from September 16 to September 21, 1958, where he won the Bronze Medal. At the 1960 Summer Olympics in Tokyo Japan he secured the 6th place for Iran. snatch event. After retirement from competitions he officiated as a referee for the international weightlifting Federation. In 1991 he migrated to Los Angeles, California United States until his passing in spring of 2002. He is survived by his wife two sons, Mehdi Sonboli & Bahram Sonboli.
