= Hla Nyunt =

Burmese boxer

Personal information
- Nationality: Burmese
- Born: 11 April 1938 (age 87); Rangoon, British Burma

Sport
- Sport: Boxing

Hla Nyunt (born 11 April 1938) is a Burmese boxer. He competed in the men's flyweight event at the 1960 Summer Olympics.
