= Sultan Mahmood (boxer) =

Pakistani boxer (born 1935)

Personal information
- Nationality: Pakistani
- Born: 15 May 1935 (age 90) Faisalabad, Pakistan
- Height: 177 cm (5 ft 10 in)
- Weight: 73 kg (161 lb)

Sport
- Sport: Boxing

Sultan Mahmood (born 15 May 1935) is a Pakistani former boxer. He competed in the men's middleweight (−75 kg) event at the 1960 Summer Olympics and the 1964 Summer Olympics.
