= Sueb Chundakowsolaya =

Thai boxer

Personal information
- Nationality: Thai
- Born: 1933 (age 91–92)

Sport
- Sport: Boxing

Sueb Chundakowsolaya (Thai: สืบ จุณฑะเกาศลย์, born 1933) is a Thai boxer. He competed in the men's lightweight event at the 1956 Summer Olympics.
