= Pakistan at the 1958 Asian Games =

- IOC code: PAK
- NOC: Pakistan Olympic Association

in Tokyo
- Medals Ranked 6th: Gold 6 Silver 11 Bronze 9 Total 26

Asian Games appearances (overview)
- 1954; 1958; 1962; 1966; 1970; 1974; 1978; 1982; 1986; 1990; 1994; 1998; 2002; 2006; 2010; 2014; 2018; 2022; 2026

Pakistan participated in the 1958 Asian Games held in the city of Tokyo, Japan, from 24 May to 1 June 1958. Pakistan ranked fifth with six gold medals in this edition of the Asiad. Five of its gold medals were in athletics and one in field hockey.

== Medal table ==
Medals by sport
Sport	Rank	Gold	Silver	Bronze	Total
Athletics	2	5	4	4	14
Wrestling	3	0	3	2	5
Boxing	6	0	2	2	4
Cycling	3	0	2	1	3
Hockey	1	1	0	0	1
Total	15	6	11	9	26

== Medalists ==
Medal	Name	Sport	Event
Gold	Abdul Khaliq	Athletics	100 m
Gold	Ghulam Raziq	Athletics	110 m hurdles
Gold	Mubarak Shah	Athletics	3,000 m steeplechase
Gold	Muhammad Iqbal	Athletics	Hammer throw
Gold	Muhammad Nawaz	Athletics	Javelin throw
Gold	Pakistan national hockey team	Hockey	Men's hockey
Silver	Abdul Khaliq	Athletics	200 m
Silver	Mubarak Shah	Athletics	10,000 m
Silver	Muhammad Ayub	Athletics	Discus throw
Silver	Jalal Khan	Athletics	Javelin throw
Silver	Sultan Mahmood	Boxing	Light heavyweight (81 kg)
Silver	Khalid Mumtaz	Boxing	Heavyweight (+81 kg)
Silver	Shahzada Shahrukh; Saleem Farooqi	Cycling	Tandem
Silver	Shahzada Shahrukh; Muhammad Ashiq; Abdul Razzaq Baloch; G. H. Baloch	Cycling	Team pursuit
Silver	Muhammad Akhter	Wrestling	Bantamweight 57 kg
Silver	Siraj Din	Wrestling	Featherweight 62 kg
Silver	Muhammad Nazir	Wrestling	Heavyweight +87 kg
Bronze	Abdul Khaliq; Ghulam Raziq; Muhammad Ramzan Ali; Muhammad Sharif Butt	Athletics	4x100 m
Bronze	Allah Ditta	Athletics	Pole vault
Bronze	Muhammad Ramzan Ali	Athletics	Long jump
Bronze	Malik Noor	Athletics	Hammer throw
Bronze	Muhammad Nasir	Boxing	Bantamweight (54 kg)
Bronze	Bait Khan	Boxing	Light middleweight (71 kg)
Bronze	Shahzada Shahrukh	Cycling	Sprint
Bronze	Shujah-ud-din	Wrestling	Flyweight 52kg
Bronze	Muhammad Bashir	Wrestling	Welterweight 73kg

== Football ==
Manager: (Pakistan) Sharif Khan

No.	Pos.	Player	Date of birth (age)	Caps	Goals	Club
	GK	Manzur Hasan Mintu	7 April 1940 (aged 18)			(Pakistan Football Federation) Kamal Sporting
	GK	Muhammad Siddiq	1933 (aged 25)			(Pakistan Football Federation) Balochistan
	DF	Abdul Haq (Vice-captain)				(Pakistan Football Federation) Punjab
	DF	Nabi Chowdhury (Captain)	1934 (aged 24)			(Pakistan Football Federation) Dhaka Wanderers
	DF	Amir Jang Ghaznavi	17 June 1933 (aged 24)			(Pakistan Football Federation) Dhaka Wanderers
	DF	Riasat Ali				(Pakistan Football Federation) Punjab
	MF	Abid Hussain Ghazi	1934 (aged 24)			(Pakistan Football Federation) Victoria SC
	MF	Masood ul Hassan Butt	1933 (aged 25)			(Pakistan Football Federation) Punjab
	MF	Hussain Killer				
	MF	Hanif				
	FW	Mari Chowdhury	29 October 1938 (aged 19)			(Pakistan Football Federation) Dhaka Mohammedan
	FW	Ashraf Chowdhury	1935 (aged 23)			(Pakistan Football Federation) Dhaka Mohammedan
	FW	Kabir Ahmed	2 February 1935 (aged 23)			(Pakistan Football Federation) Dhaka Mohammedan
	FW	Muhammad Umer	1935 (aged 23)			(All India Football Federation) Kolkata Mohammedan
	FW	Ghulam Rabbani	31 December 1936 (aged 21)			(Pakistan Football Federation) Punjab
	FW	Talib Ali	1941 (aged 17)			(Pakistan Football Federation) Punjab
	FW	Ibrahim				
		Shaukat Muhammad				

=== Group stage ===
Team	Pld	W	D	L	GF	GA	GR	Pts
Taiwan	2	2	0	0	5	2	2.500	4
South Vietnam	2	1	1	0	7	2	3.500	3
Pakistan	2	0	1	1	2	4	0.500	1
Malaya	2	0	0	2	2	8	0.250	0

Source: RSSSF
25 May

South Vietnam	1–1	Pakistan

Tokyo

27 May

Pakistan	1–3	Taiwan
Umer 2'		Ho Ying Fun 6'; Law Kwok-tai 19'; Mok Chun Wah

Korakuen Velodrome, Tokyo
Attendance: 2,000
