= South Korea at the 1958 Asian Games =

- IOC code: KOR
- NOC: Korean Olympic Committee

in Tokyo
- Competitors: 119 in 15 sports
- Officials: 37
- Medals Ranked 3rd: Gold 8 Silver 7 Bronze 12 Total 27

Asian Games appearances (overview)
- 1954; 1958; 1962; 1966; 1970; 1974; 1978; 1982; 1986; 1990; 1994; 1998; 2002; 2006; 2010; 2014; 2018; 2022; 2026

South Korea (IOC designation:Korea) participated in the 1958 Asian Games held in Tokyo, Japan from May 24, 1958, to June 1, 1958.

== Medal summary ==
=== Medal table ===
| Sport | Gold | Silver | Bronze | Total |
|---|---|---|---|---|
| Weightlifting | 2 | 2 | 1 | 5 |
| Athletics | 2 | 1 | 2 | 5 |
| Cycling | 2 | 1 | 1 | 4 |
| Boxing | 2 | 0 | 3 | 5 |
| Table tennis | 0 | 1 | 2 | 3 |
| Football | 0 | 1 | 0 | 1 |
| Volleyball | 0 | 1 | 0 | 1 |
| Wrestling | 0 | 0 | 2 | 2 |
| Hockey | 0 | 0 | 1 | 1 |
| Totals (9 entries) | 8 | 7 | 12 | 27 |

=== Medalists ===
| Medal | Name | Sport | Event |
|---|---|---|---|
| Gold | Seo Young-Ju | Athletics | Men's Long jump |
| Gold | Lee Chang-Hoon | Athletics | Men's Marathon |
| Gold | Chung Dong-Hoon | Boxing | Men's Lightweight (-60 kg) |
| Gold | Kim Ki-Soo | Boxing | Men's Welterweight (-67 kg) |
| Gold | Lee Heung-Bok | Cycling | Men's Road race |
| Gold | Team Korea | Cycling | Men's Road race teams |
| Gold | Lee Jang-Woo | Weightlifting | Men's -52 kg |
| Gold | Lee Taek-Young | Weightlifting | Men's -60 kg |
| Silver | Han Seung-Chul | Athletics | Men's 5000 m |
| Silver | No Do-Chun | Cycling | Men's Road race |
| Silver | Team Korea | Football | Men's Team competition |
| Silver | Team Korea | Table Tennis | Women's Team competition |
| Silver | Team Korea | Volleyball | Men's Team competition |
| Silver | Hwang Ho-Dong | Weightlifting | Men's -90 kg |
| Silver | Lee Yong-Wan | Weightlifting | Men's +90 kg |
| Bronze | Sim Sang-Ok | Athletics | Men's 800 m |
| Bronze | Sim Sang-Ok | Athletics | Men's 1500 m |
| Bronze | Kim Chang-Han | Boxing | Men's Flyweight (-51 kg) |
| Bronze | Song Soon-Chun | Boxing | Men's Featherweight (-57 kg) |
| Bronze | Kim Deuk-Bong | Boxing | Men's Lightwelterweight (-63.5 kg) |
| Bronze | Kim Ho-Soon | Cycling | Men's Road race |
| Bronze | Team Korea | Hockey | Men's Team competition |
| Bronze | Cho Kyung-Ja | Table Tennis | Women's Singles |
| Bronze | Team Korea | Table Tennis | Women's Doubles |
| Bronze | Park Dong-Chul | Weightlifting | Men's -82.5 kg |
| Bronze | Bong Chang-Won | Wrestling | Men's Freestyle -67 kg |
| Bronze | Hwang Jae-Woon | Wrestling | Men's Freestyle -87 kg |
