= Japan at the 1958 Asian Games =

- IOC code: JPN
- NOC: Japanese Olympic Committee

in Tokyo 24 May 1958 - 1 June 1958
- Medals Ranked 1st: Gold 67 Silver 41 Bronze 30 Total 138

Asian Games appearances (overview)
- 1951; 1954; 1958; 1962; 1966; 1970; 1974; 1978; 1982; 1986; 1990; 1994; 1998; 2002; 2006; 2010; 2014; 2018; 2022; 2026

Japan participated and hosted the 1958 Asian Games held in the capital city of Tokyo. This country was ranked 1st with 67 gold medals, 41 silver medals and 30 bronze medals with a total of 138 medals to secure its top spot in the medal tally.

== Medalists ==
Medal	Name	Sport	Event
Gold	Yoshitaka Muroya	Athletics	Men's 800 m
Gold	Osamu Inoue	Athletics	Men's 5000 m
Gold	Takashi Baba	Athletics	Men's 10,000 m
Gold	Kanji Akagi; Keiji Ogushi; Takejiro Hayashi; Yoshitaka Muroya	Athletics	Men's 4 × 400 m relay
Gold	Noriaki Yasuda	Athletics	Men's pole vault
Silver	Kyohei Ushio	Athletics	Men's 100 m
Silver	Michio Okayama	Athletics	Men's 1500 m
Silver	Keiji Ogushi	Athletics	Men's 400 m hurdles
Silver	Masayuki Nunogami	Athletics	Men's 3000 m steeplechase
Silver	Kyohei Ushio; Masaru Kamata; Yoshiaki Hara; Yasuhiro Yanagi	Athletics	Men's 4 × 100 m relay
Silver	Noboru Kasamatsu	Athletics	Men's high jump
Silver	Kozo Akasaka	Athletics	Men's pole vault
Bronze	Hirokazu Yasuda	Athletics	Men's 110 m hurdles
Bronze	Susumu Takahashi	Athletics	Men's 3000 m steeplechase
Bronze	Nobuyoshi Sadanaga	Athletics	Men's marathon
Bronze	Yukio Ishikawa	Athletics	Men's high jump

Medals by sport
Sport	1st place, gold medalist(s)	2nd place, silver medalist(s)	3rd place, bronze medalist(s)	Total
Athletics	12	15	9	36
Total	67	41	30	138
