= List of Asian Games medalists in tennis =

This is the complete list of Asian Games medalists in tennis from 1958 to 2026.

== Events ==
=== Men's singles ===
Games	Gold	Silver	Bronze
1958 Tokyo	Raymundo Deyro (PHI)	Felicisimo Ampon (PHI)	Miguel Dungo (PHI)
1958 Tokyo	Raymundo Deyro (PHI)	Felicisimo Ampon (PHI)	Johnny Jose (PHI)
1962 Jakarta	Johnny Jose (PHI)	Atsushi Miyagi (JPN)	Michio Fujii (JPN)
1962 Jakarta	Johnny Jose (PHI)	Atsushi Miyagi (JPN)	Osamu Ishiguro (JPN)
1966 Bangkok	Osamu Ishiguro (JPN)	Ichizo Konishi (JPN)	Taghi Akbari (IRN)
1966 Bangkok	Osamu Ishiguro (JPN)	Ichizo Konishi (JPN)	Jesus Hernandez (PHI)
1974 Tehran	Toshiro Sakai (JPN)	Taghi Akbari (IRN)	Yehoshua Shalem (ISR)
1978 Bangkok	Atet Wijono (INA)	Shigeyuki Nishio (JPN)	Tetsu Kuramitsu (JPN)
1978 Bangkok	Atet Wijono (INA)	Shigeyuki Nishio (JPN)	Nadir Ali Khan (PAK)
1982 New Delhi	Yustedjo Tarik (INA)	Kim Choon-ho (KOR)	Liu Shuhua (CHN)
1986 Seoul	Yoo Jin-sun (KOR)	Kim Bong-soo (KOR)	Liu Shuhua (CHN)
1990 Beijing	Pan Bing (CHN)	Zhang Jiuhua (CHN)	Kim Bong-soo (KOR)
1990 Beijing	Pan Bing (CHN)	Zhang Jiuhua (CHN)	Kim Jae-sik (KOR)
1994 Hiroshima	Pan Bing (CHN)	Yoon Yong-il (KOR)	Benny Wijaya (INA)
1994 Hiroshima	Pan Bing (CHN)	Yoon Yong-il (KOR)	Leander Paes (IND)
1998 Bangkok	Yoon Yong-il (KOR)	Satoshi Iwabuchi (JPN)	Mahesh Bhupathi (IND)
1998 Bangkok	Yoon Yong-il (KOR)	Satoshi Iwabuchi (JPN)	Srinath Prahlad (IND)
2002 Busan	Paradorn Srichaphan (THA)	Lee Hyung-taik (KOR)	Takao Suzuki (JPN)
2002 Busan	Paradorn Srichaphan (THA)	Lee Hyung-taik (KOR)	Oleg Ogorodov (UZB)
2006 Doha	Danai Udomchoke (THA)	Lee Hyung-taik (KOR)	Go Soeda (JPN)
2006 Doha	Danai Udomchoke (THA)	Lee Hyung-taik (KOR)	Cecil Mamiit (PHI)
2010 Guangzhou	Somdev Devvarman (IND)	Denis Istomin (UZB)	Tatsuma Ito (JPN)
2010 Guangzhou	Somdev Devvarman (IND)	Denis Istomin (UZB)	Go Soeda (JPN)
2014 Incheon	Yoshihito Nishioka (JPN)	Lu Yen-hsun (TPE)	Yuki Bhambri (IND)
2014 Incheon	Yoshihito Nishioka (JPN)	Lu Yen-hsun (TPE)	Yuichi Sugita (JPN)
2018 Jakarta–Palembang	Denis Istomin (UZB)	Wu Yibing (CHN)	Prajnesh Gunneswaran (IND)
2018 Jakarta–Palembang	Denis Istomin (UZB)	Wu Yibing (CHN)	Lee Duck-hee (KOR)
2022 Hangzhou	Zhang Zhizhen (CHN)	Yosuke Watanuki (JPN)	Hong Seong-chan (KOR)
2022 Hangzhou	Zhang Zhizhen (CHN)	Yosuke Watanuki (JPN)	Khumoyun Sultanov (UZB)
2026 Aichi–Nagoya	Coleman Wong (HKG)	Wu Yibing (CHN)	Hayato Matsuoka (JPN)
2026 Aichi–Nagoya	Coleman Wong (HKG)	Wu Yibing (CHN)	Khumoyun Sultanov (UZB)

=== Men's doubles ===
Games	Gold	Silver	Bronze
1958 Tokyo	Felicisimo Ampon and Raymundo Deyro (PHI)	Johnny Jose and Miguel Dungo (PHI)	Rupert Ferdinands and Bernard Pinto (CEY)
1958 Tokyo	Felicisimo Ampon and Raymundo Deyro (PHI)	Johnny Jose and Miguel Dungo (PHI)	Võ Văn Bảy and Võ Văn Thành (VNM)
1962 Jakarta	Atsushi Miyagi and Michio Fujii (JPN)	Johnny Jose and Raymundo Deyro (PHI)	Bernard Pinto and Raja Praesody (CEY)
1962 Jakarta	Atsushi Miyagi and Michio Fujii (JPN)	Johnny Jose and Raymundo Deyro (PHI)	Miguel Dungo and Willie Hernandez (PHI)
1966 Bangkok	Osamu Ishiguro and Koji Watanabe (JPN)	Võ Văn Bảy and Lưu Hoàng Đức (VNM)	Shiv Prakash Misra and Vinay Dhawan (IND)
1966 Bangkok	Osamu Ishiguro and Koji Watanabe (JPN)	Võ Văn Bảy and Lưu Hoàng Đức (VNM)	Sutiraphan Karalak and Netra Gramatica (THA)
1974 Tehran	Toshiro Sakai and Kenichi Hirai (JPN)	Ali Madani and Kambiz Derafshijavan (IRN)	Ryoichi Mori and Natsuta Uehara (JPN)
1978 Bangkok	Yustedjo Tarik and Hadiman (INA)	Xu Meilin and Gu Minghua (CHN)	Shyam Minotra and Chiradip Mukerjea (IND)
1978 Bangkok	Yustedjo Tarik and Hadiman (INA)	Xu Meilin and Gu Minghua (CHN)	Pichet Boratisa and Charuek Hengrasmee (THA)
1982 New Delhi	Kim Choon-ho and Lee Woo-ryong (KOR)	Song Dong-wook and Jeon Yeong-dae (KOR)	Liu Shuhua and Ma Keqin (CHN)
1986 Seoul	Yoo Jin-sun and Kim Bong-soo (KOR)	Ma Keqin and Liu Shuhua (CHN)	Donald Wailan-Walalangi and Sulistyono (INA)
1990 Beijing	Xia Jiaping and Meng Qianghua (CHN)	Liu Shuhua and Pan Bing (CHN)	Bonit Wiryawan and Daniel Heryanto (INA)
1990 Beijing	Xia Jiaping and Meng Qianghua (CHN)	Liu Shuhua and Pan Bing (CHN)	Lee Jin-ho and Ji Seung-ho (KOR)
1994 Hiroshima	Leander Paes and Gaurav Natekar (IND)	Chang Eui-jong and Kim Chi-wan (KOR)	Pan Bing and Xia Jiaping (CHN)
1994 Hiroshima	Leander Paes and Gaurav Natekar (IND)	Chang Eui-jong and Kim Chi-wan (KOR)	Donny Susetyo and Teddy Tandjung (INA)
1998 Bangkok	Paradorn Srichaphan and Narathorn Srichaphan (THA)	Lee Hyung-taik and Yoon Yong-il (KOR)	Michihisa Onoda and Takahiro Terachi (JPN)
1998 Bangkok	Paradorn Srichaphan and Narathorn Srichaphan (THA)	Lee Hyung-taik and Yoon Yong-il (KOR)	Chen Chih-jung and Lin Bing-chao (TPE)
2002 Busan	Leander Paes and Mahesh Bhupathi (IND)	Chung Hee-seok and Lee Hyung-taik (KOR)	Vishal Uppal and Mustafa Ghouse (IND)
2002 Busan	Leander Paes and Mahesh Bhupathi (IND)	Chung Hee-seok and Lee Hyung-taik (KOR)	Kwon Oh-hee and Kim Dong-hyun (KOR)
2006 Doha	Leander Paes and Mahesh Bhupathi (IND)	Sanchai Ratiwatana and Sonchat Ratiwatana (THA)	Jun Woong-sun and Kim Sun-yong (KOR)
2006 Doha	Leander Paes and Mahesh Bhupathi (IND)	Sanchai Ratiwatana and Sonchat Ratiwatana (THA)	Cecil Mamiit and Eric Taino (PHI)
2010 Guangzhou	Somdev Devvarman and Sanam Singh (IND)	Gong Maoxin and Li Zhe (CHN)	Cho Soong-jae and Kim Hyun-joon (KOR)
2010 Guangzhou	Somdev Devvarman and Sanam Singh (IND)	Gong Maoxin and Li Zhe (CHN)	Yi Chu-huan and Lee Hsin-han (TPE)
2014 Incheon	Chung Hyeon and Lim Yong-kyu (KOR)	Saketh Myneni and Sanam Singh (IND)	Yuki Bhambri and Divij Sharan (IND)
2014 Incheon	Chung Hyeon and Lim Yong-kyu (KOR)	Saketh Myneni and Sanam Singh (IND)	Sanchai Ratiwatana and Sonchat Ratiwatana (THA)
2018 Jakarta–Palembang	Rohan Bopanna and Divij Sharan (IND)	Alexander Bublik and Denis Yevseyev (KAZ)	Kaito Uesugi and Sho Shimabukuro (JPN)
2018 Jakarta–Palembang	Rohan Bopanna and Divij Sharan (IND)	Alexander Bublik and Denis Yevseyev (KAZ)	Yosuke Watanuki and Yuya Ito (JPN)
2022 Hangzhou	Hsu Yu-hsiou and Jason Jung (TPE)	Saketh Myneni and Ramkumar Ramanathan (IND)	Hong Seong-chan and Kwon Soon-woo (KOR)
2022 Hangzhou	Hsu Yu-hsiou and Jason Jung (TPE)	Saketh Myneni and Ramkumar Ramanathan (IND)	Pruchya Isaro and Maximus Jones (THA)
2026 Aichi–Nagoya	Yusuke Kusuhara and Shunsuke Nakagawa (JPN)	Nam Ji-sung and Park Ui-sung (KOR)	Jiang Fumin and Zhang Tianhui (CHN)
2026 Aichi–Nagoya	Yusuke Kusuhara and Shunsuke Nakagawa (JPN)	Nam Ji-sung and Park Ui-sung (KOR)	Ray Ho and Hsu Yu-hsiou (TPE)

=== Men's team ===
Games	Gold	Silver	Bronze
1962 Jakarta	Japan (JPN); Michio Fujii; Osamu Ishiguro; Atsushi Miyagi; Koji Watanabe	Philippines (PHI); Raymundo Deyro; Miguel Dungo; Willie Hernandez; Johnny Jose	Indonesia (INA); Sofyan Mudjirat; N. Sanusi; Sutarjo Sugiarto; K. Tjokrosaputro
1966 Bangkok	Japan (JPN); Osamu Ishiguro; Ichizo Konishi; Koji Watanabe; Keishiro Yanagi	Thailand (THA); Somparn Champisri; Seri Charuchinda; Netra Gramatica; Sutiraphan Karalak	Iran (IRN); Taghi Akbari; Issa Khodaei; Ezzatollah Nemati; Nematollah Nemati
1966 Bangkok	Japan (JPN); Osamu Ishiguro; Ichizo Konishi; Koji Watanabe; Keishiro Yanagi	Thailand (THA); Somparn Champisri; Seri Charuchinda; Netra Gramatica; Sutiraphan Karalak	Philippines (PHI); Delfin Contreras; Federico Deyro; Jesus Hernandez; Augusto Villanueva
1974 Tehran	Japan (JPN); Kenichi Hirai; Ryoichi Mori; Toshiro Sakai; Natsuta Uehara	China (CHN); Gao Hongyun; Lü Zhengyi; Wang Fuzhang; Xu Meilin	Pakistan (PAK); Munawar Iqbal; Ismail Majid; Saeed Meer; Meer Muhammad
1978 Bangkok	Indonesia (INA); Hadiman; Yustedjo Tarik; Gondo Widjojo; Atet Wijono	Pakistan (PAK); Jamil Ahmed; Nasir Munir Ahmed; Altaf Hussain; Nadir Ali Khan	China (CHN); Gu Minghua; Sun Chunlai; Wang Fuzhang; Xu Meilin
1978 Bangkok	Indonesia (INA); Hadiman; Yustedjo Tarik; Gondo Widjojo; Atet Wijono	Pakistan (PAK); Jamil Ahmed; Nasir Munir Ahmed; Altaf Hussain; Nadir Ali Khan	Japan (JPN); Tetsu Kuramitsu; Shigeyuki Nishio; Etsuo Uchiyama
1982 New Delhi	Indonesia (INA); Hadiman; Yustedjo Tarik; Donald Wailan-Walalangi; Tintus Arianto Wibowo	India (IND); Nandan Bal; Enrico Piperno; Jayant Rikhye; Srinivasan Vasudevan	China (CHN); Liu Shuhua; Ma Keqin; You Wei
1986 Seoul	South Korea (KOR); Kim Bong-soo; Roh Gap-taik; Song Dong-wook; Yoo Jin-sun	China (CHN); Liu Shuhua; Ma Keqin; Xie Zhao; You Wei	Thailand (THA); Vittaya Samrej; Thanakorn Srichaphan; Woraphol Thongkhamchu; Sombat Uamongkol
1990 Beijing	China (CHN); Liu Shuhua; Meng Qianghua; Pan Bing; Xia Jiaping	South Korea (KOR); Bae Nam-ju; Kim Bong-soo; Kim Jae-sik; Yoo Jin-sun	Indonesia (INA); Daniel Heryanto; Hary Suharyadi; Benny Wijaya; Bonit Wiryawan
1990 Beijing	China (CHN); Liu Shuhua; Meng Qianghua; Pan Bing; Xia Jiaping	South Korea (KOR); Bae Nam-ju; Kim Bong-soo; Kim Jae-sik; Yoo Jin-sun	India (IND); Zeeshan Ali; Leander Paes; Rohit Rajpal; Srinivasan Vasudevan
1994 Hiroshima	India (IND); Zeeshan Ali; Asif Ismail; Gaurav Natekar; Leander Paes	Indonesia (INA); Donny Susetyo; Suwandi; Benny Wijaya; Bonit Wiryawan	Japan (JPN); Satoshi Iwabuchi; Goichi Motomura; Ryuso Tsujino; Yasufumi Yamamoto
1994 Hiroshima	India (IND); Zeeshan Ali; Asif Ismail; Gaurav Natekar; Leander Paes	Indonesia (INA); Donny Susetyo; Suwandi; Benny Wijaya; Bonit Wiryawan	Malaysia (MAS); Wilson Khoo; Adam Malik; Ramayah Ramachandran
1998 Bangkok	South Korea (KOR); Kim Dong-hyun; Lee Hyung-taik; Song Hyeong-keun; Yoon Yong-il	Japan (JPN); Satoshi Iwabuchi; Hideki Kaneko; Michihisa Onoda; Takahiro Terachi	India (IND); Mahesh Bhupathi; Syed Fazaluddin; Nitin Kirtane; Srinath Prahlad
1998 Bangkok	South Korea (KOR); Kim Dong-hyun; Lee Hyung-taik; Song Hyeong-keun; Yoon Yong-il	Japan (JPN); Satoshi Iwabuchi; Hideki Kaneko; Michihisa Onoda; Takahiro Terachi	Uzbekistan (UZB); Vadim Kutsenko; Oleg Ogorodov; Dmitri Tomashevich
2002 Busan	Japan (JPN); Michihisa Onoda; Thomas Shimada; Takao Suzuki; Takahiro Terachi	South Korea (KOR); Chung Hee-seok; Kim Dong-hyun; Lee Hyung-taik; Yoon Yong-il	Indonesia (INA); Peter Handoyo; Suwandi; Tintus Arianto Wibowo
2002 Busan	Japan (JPN); Michihisa Onoda; Thomas Shimada; Takao Suzuki; Takahiro Terachi	South Korea (KOR); Chung Hee-seok; Kim Dong-hyun; Lee Hyung-taik; Yoon Yong-il	Uzbekistan (UZB); Vadim Kutsenko; Oleg Ogorodov; Dmitri Tomashevich
2006 Doha	South Korea (KOR); An Jae-sung; Chung Hee-seok; Jun Woong-sun; Lee Hyung-taik	Japan (JPN); Satoshi Iwabuchi; Toshihide Matsui; Go Soeda; Takao Suzuki	Thailand (THA); Sanchai Ratiwatana; Sonchat Ratiwatana; Paradorn Srichaphan; Danai Udomchoke
2006 Doha	South Korea (KOR); An Jae-sung; Chung Hee-seok; Jun Woong-sun; Lee Hyung-taik	Japan (JPN); Satoshi Iwabuchi; Toshihide Matsui; Go Soeda; Takao Suzuki	Chinese Taipei (TPE); Chen Ti; Lu Yen-hsun; Jimmy Wang; Yi Chu-huan
2010 Guangzhou	Chinese Taipei (TPE); Chen Ti; Lu Yen-hsun; Yang Tsung-hua; Yi Chu-huan	Uzbekistan (UZB); Farrukh Dustov; Murad Inoyatov; Denis Istomin; Vaja Uzakov	India (IND); Somdev Devvarman; Karan Rastogi; Sanam Singh; Vishnu Vardhan
2010 Guangzhou	Chinese Taipei (TPE); Chen Ti; Lu Yen-hsun; Yang Tsung-hua; Yi Chu-huan	Uzbekistan (UZB); Farrukh Dustov; Murad Inoyatov; Denis Istomin; Vaja Uzakov	Japan (JPN); Tatsuma Ito; Toshihide Matsui; Go Soeda; Takao Suzuki
2014 Incheon	Kazakhstan (KAZ); Andrey Golubev; Mikhail Kukushkin; Aleksandr Nedovyesov	China (CHN); Gong Maoxin; Li Zhe; Wu Di; Zhang Ze	Japan (JPN); Tatsuma Ito; Yoshihito Nishioka; Yuichi Sugita; Yasutaka Uchiyama
2014 Incheon	Kazakhstan (KAZ); Andrey Golubev; Mikhail Kukushkin; Aleksandr Nedovyesov	China (CHN); Gong Maoxin; Li Zhe; Wu Di; Zhang Ze	Uzbekistan (UZB); Farrukh Dustov; Sanjar Fayziev; Temur Ismailov; Denis Istomin

=== Women's singles ===
Games	Gold	Silver	Bronze
1958 Tokyo	Sachiko Kamo (JPN)	Desideria Ampon (PHI)	Reiko Miyagi (JPN)
1958 Tokyo	Sachiko Kamo (JPN)	Desideria Ampon (PHI)	Liu Shang-ku (ROC)
1962 Jakarta	Akiko Fukui (JPN)	Reiko Miyagi (JPN)	Desideria Ampon (PHI)
1962 Jakarta	Akiko Fukui (JPN)	Reiko Miyagi (JPN)	Patricia Yngayo (PHI)
1966 Bangkok	Lany Kaligis (INA)	Kazuko Kuromatsu (JPN)	Lita Liem (INA)
1966 Bangkok	Lany Kaligis (INA)	Kazuko Kuromatsu (JPN)	Phanow Sudsawasdi (THA)
1974 Tehran	Lita Sugiarto (INA)	Paulina Peisachov (ISR)	Lany Kaligis (INA)
1978 Bangkok	Lee Duk-hee (KOR)	Chen Juan (CHN)	Kiyoko Nomura (JPN)
1978 Bangkok	Lee Duk-hee (KOR)	Chen Juan (CHN)	Sonoe Yonezawa (JPN)
1982 New Delhi	Etsuko Inoue (JPN)	Kim Soo-ok (KOR)	Yu Liqiao (CHN)
1986 Seoul	Li Xinyi (CHN)	Lee Jeong-soon (KOR)	Kim Soo-ok (KOR)
1990 Beijing	Akiko Kijimuta (JPN)	Chen Li (CHN)	Kim Il-soon (KOR)
1990 Beijing	Akiko Kijimuta (JPN)	Chen Li (CHN)	Park Mal-sim (KOR)
1994 Hiroshima	Kimiko Date (JPN)	Naoko Sawamatsu (JPN)	Chen Li (CHN)
1994 Hiroshima	Kimiko Date (JPN)	Naoko Sawamatsu (JPN)	Yayuk Basuki (INA)
1998 Bangkok	Yayuk Basuki (INA)	Tamarine Tanasugarn (THA)	Li Fang (CHN)
1998 Bangkok	Yayuk Basuki (INA)	Tamarine Tanasugarn (THA)	Yi Jingqian (CHN)
2002 Busan	Iroda Tulyaganova (UZB)	Tamarine Tanasugarn (THA)	Shinobu Asagoe (JPN)
2002 Busan	Iroda Tulyaganova (UZB)	Tamarine Tanasugarn (THA)	Cho Yoon-jeong (KOR)
2006 Doha	Zheng Jie (CHN)	Sania Mirza (IND)	Li Na (CHN)
2006 Doha	Zheng Jie (CHN)	Sania Mirza (IND)	Aiko Nakamura (JPN)
2010 Guangzhou	Peng Shuai (CHN)	Akgul Amanmuradova (UZB)	Sania Mirza (IND)
2010 Guangzhou	Peng Shuai (CHN)	Akgul Amanmuradova (UZB)	Kimiko Date-Krumm (JPN)
2014 Incheon	Wang Qiang (CHN)	Luksika Kumkhum (THA)	Misa Eguchi (JPN)
2014 Incheon	Wang Qiang (CHN)	Luksika Kumkhum (THA)	Eri Hozumi (JPN)
2018 Jakarta–Palembang	Wang Qiang (CHN)	Zhang Shuai (CHN)	Ankita Raina (IND)
2018 Jakarta–Palembang	Wang Qiang (CHN)	Zhang Shuai (CHN)	Liang En-shuo (TPE)
2022 Hangzhou	Zheng Qinwen (CHN)	Zhu Lin (CHN)	Haruka Kaji (JPN)
2022 Hangzhou	Zheng Qinwen (CHN)	Zhu Lin (CHN)	Alexandra Eala (PHI)
2026 Aichi–Nagoya	Wang Xiyu (CHN)	Zhang Shuai (CHN)	Yulia Putintseva (KAZ)
2026 Aichi–Nagoya	Wang Xiyu (CHN)	Zhang Shuai (CHN)	Alexandra Eala (PHI)

=== Women's doubles ===
Games	Gold	Silver	Bronze
1958 Tokyo	Sachiko Kamo and Reiko Miyagi (JPN)	Desideria Ampon and Patricia Yngayo (PHI)	Gladys Loke and Katherine Leong (MAL)
1958 Tokyo	Sachiko Kamo and Reiko Miyagi (JPN)	Desideria Ampon and Patricia Yngayo (PHI)	Liu Shang-ku and Chan Shiuo-miang (ROC)
1962 Jakarta	Reiko Miyagi and Akiko Fukui (JPN)	Ranjani Jayasuriya (CEY); Tsui Yuen Yuen (HKG)	Jooce Suwarimbo and Mien Suhadi (INA)
1962 Jakarta	Reiko Miyagi and Akiko Fukui (JPN)	Ranjani Jayasuriya (CEY); Tsui Yuen Yuen (HKG)	Desideria Ampon and Patricia Yngayo (PHI)
1966 Bangkok	Lita Liem and Lany Kaligis (INA)	Desideria Ampon and Patricia Yngayo (PHI)	Ranjani Jayasuriya and Wendy Molligoda (CEY)
1966 Bangkok	Lita Liem and Lany Kaligis (INA)	Desideria Ampon and Patricia Yngayo (PHI)	Yang Jeong-soon and Park Jong-bok (KOR)
1974 Tehran	Toshiko Sade and Kayoko Fukuoka (JPN)	Lee Soon-oh and Lee Duk-hee (KOR)	Kimiyo Yagahara and Hideko Goto (JPN)
1978 Bangkok	Lee Duk-hee and Yang Jeong-soon (KOR)	Kimiyo Hatanaka and Kiyoko Nomura (JPN)	Chen Juan and Yu Liqiao (CHN)
1978 Bangkok	Lee Duk-hee and Yang Jeong-soon (KOR)	Kimiyo Hatanaka and Kiyoko Nomura (JPN)	Suthasini Sirikaya and Sirikanya Hoonsiri (THA)
1982 New Delhi	Shin Soon-ho and Kim Nam-sook (KOR)	Junko Kimura and Kazuko Ito (JPN)	Masako Yanagi and Etsuko Inoue (JPN)
1986 Seoul	Suzanna Anggarkusuma and Yayuk Basuki (INA)	Lee Jeong-soon and Kim Il-soon (KOR)	Shin Soon-ho and Park Yang-ja (KOR)
1990 Beijing	Yayuk Basuki and Suzanna Wibowo (INA)	Lee Jeong-myung and Kim Il-soon (KOR)	Lukky Tedjamukti and Irawati Moerid (INA)
1990 Beijing	Yayuk Basuki and Suzanna Wibowo (INA)	Lee Jeong-myung and Kim Il-soon (KOR)	Nana Miyagi and Akiko Kijimuta (JPN)
1994 Hiroshima	Kyoko Nagatsuka and Ai Sugiyama (JPN)	Li Fang and Chen Li (CHN)	Nana Miyagi and Mana Endo (JPN)
1994 Hiroshima	Kyoko Nagatsuka and Ai Sugiyama (JPN)	Li Fang and Chen Li (CHN)	Park Sung-hee and Choi Ju-yeon (KOR)
1998 Bangkok	Li Fang and Chen Li (CHN)	Cho Yoon-jeong and Park Sung-hee (KOR)	Yi Jingqian and Li Li (CHN)
1998 Bangkok	Li Fang and Chen Li (CHN)	Cho Yoon-jeong and Park Sung-hee (KOR)	Rika Hiraki and Nana Miyagi (JPN)
2002 Busan	Kim Mi-ok and Choi Young-ja (KOR)	Wynne Prakusya and Angelique Widjaja (INA)	Saori Obata and Akiko Morigami (JPN)
2002 Busan	Kim Mi-ok and Choi Young-ja (KOR)	Wynne Prakusya and Angelique Widjaja (INA)	Yuka Yoshida and Miho Saeki (JPN)
2006 Doha	Zheng Jie and Yan Zi (CHN)	Latisha Chan and Chuang Chia-jung (TPE)	Li Ting and Sun Tiantian (CHN)
2006 Doha	Zheng Jie and Yan Zi (CHN)	Latisha Chan and Chuang Chia-jung (TPE)	Ryoko Fuda and Tomoko Yonemura (JPN)
2010 Guangzhou	Latisha Chan and Chuang Chia-jung (TPE)	Chang Kai-chen and Hsieh Su-wei (TPE)	Peng Shuai and Yan Zi (CHN)
2010 Guangzhou	Latisha Chan and Chuang Chia-jung (TPE)	Chang Kai-chen and Hsieh Su-wei (TPE)	Kim So-jung and Lee Jin-a (KOR)
2014 Incheon	Luksika Kumkhum and Tamarine Tanasugarn (THA)	Hsieh Su-wei and Chan Chin-wei (TPE)	Sania Mirza and Prarthana Thombare (IND)
2014 Incheon	Luksika Kumkhum and Tamarine Tanasugarn (THA)	Hsieh Su-wei and Chan Chin-wei (TPE)	Chan Hao-ching and Latisha Chan (TPE)
2018 Jakarta–Palembang	Xu Yifan and Yang Zhaoxuan (CHN)	Chan Hao-ching and Latisha Chan (TPE)	Miyu Kato and Makoto Ninomiya (JPN)
2018 Jakarta–Palembang	Xu Yifan and Yang Zhaoxuan (CHN)	Chan Hao-ching and Latisha Chan (TPE)	Gozal Ainitdinova and Anna Danilina (KAZ)
2022 Hangzhou	Chan Hao-ching and Latisha Chan (TPE)	Lee Ya-hsuan and Liang En-shuo (TPE)	Aldila Sutjiadi and Janice Tjen (INA)
2022 Hangzhou	Chan Hao-ching and Latisha Chan (TPE)	Lee Ya-hsuan and Liang En-shuo (TPE)	Back Da-yeon and Jeong Bo-young (KOR)
2026 Aichi–Nagoya	Hsieh Su-wei and Liang En-shuo (TPE)	Chan Hao-ching and Wu Fang-hsien (TPE)	Eudice Chong and Cody Wong (HKG)
2026 Aichi–Nagoya	Hsieh Su-wei and Liang En-shuo (TPE)	Chan Hao-ching and Wu Fang-hsien (TPE)	Anna Danilina and Yulia Putintseva (KAZ)

=== Women's team ===
Games	Gold	Silver	Bronze
1962 Jakarta	Japan (JPN); Akiko Fukui; Reiko Miyagi	Indonesia (INA); Vonny Djoa; Mien Suhadi; Jooce Suwarimbo	Philippines (PHI); Desideria Ampon; Patricia Yngayo
1966 Bangkok	Indonesia (INA); Lany Kaligis; Lita Liem; Mien Suhadi	Japan (JPN); Kazuko Kuromatsu; Reiko Miyagi; Yoko Obata	Ceylon (CEY); Sria Gooneratne; Ranjani Jayasuriya; Wendy Molligoda
1966 Bangkok	Indonesia (INA); Lany Kaligis; Lita Liem; Mien Suhadi	Japan (JPN); Kazuko Kuromatsu; Reiko Miyagi; Yoko Obata	Philippines (PHI); Desideria Ampon; Patricia Yngayo
1974 Tehran	South Korea (KOR); Choi Kyung-mi; Lee Duk-hee; Lee Soon-oh; Yang Jeong-soon	China (CHN); Guo Hanqin; Jiang Lihua; Yan Dacui; Zhang Ronghua	Japan (JPN); Kayoko Fukuoka; Hideko Goto; Toshiko Sade; Kimiyo Yagahara
1978 Bangkok	Japan (JPN); Kimiyo Hatanaka; Matsuko Matsushima; Kiyoko Nomura; Sonoe Yonezawa	South Korea (KOR); Kim Nam-sook; Kim Soo-ok; Lee Duk-hee; Yang Jeong-soon	Indonesia (INA); Lita Sugiarto; Yolanda Soemarno; Ayi Sutarno; Elvis Tarik
1982 New Delhi	South Korea (KOR); Kim Nam-sook; Kim Soo-ok; Seol Min-kyung; Shin Soon-ho	China (CHN); Duan Lilan; Wang Ping; Yu Liqiao; Zhu Xiaoyun	Japan (JPN); Etsuko Inoue; Kazuko Ito; Junko Kimura; Masako Yanagi
1986 Seoul	China (CHN); Duan Lilan; Li Xinyi; Pu Xiufen; Zhong Ni	South Korea (KOR); Kim Il-soon; Kim Soo-ok; Lee Jeong-soon; Park Yang-ja	Indonesia (INA); Suzanna Anggarkusuma; Yayuk Basuki; Sri Utaminingsih
1990 Beijing	Japan (JPN); Kimiko Date; Akiko Kijimuta; Nana Miyagi; Naoko Sawamatsu	Indonesia (INA); Yayuk Basuki; Irawati Moerid; Lukky Tedjamukti; Suzanna Wibowo	China (CHN); Chen Li; Li Fang; Li Yanling; Tang Min
1990 Beijing	Japan (JPN); Kimiko Date; Akiko Kijimuta; Nana Miyagi; Naoko Sawamatsu	Indonesia (INA); Yayuk Basuki; Irawati Moerid; Lukky Tedjamukti; Suzanna Wibowo	South Korea (KOR); Im Sook-ja; Kim Il-soon; Lee Jeong-myung; Park Mal-sim
1994 Hiroshima	Japan (JPN); Mana Endo; Nana Miyagi; Naoko Sawamatsu; Ai Sugiyama	Indonesia (INA); Yayuk Basuki; Natalia Soetrisno; Romana Tedjakusuma; Veronica Widyadharma	China (CHN); Bi Ying; Chen Li; Li Fang; Yi Jingqian
1994 Hiroshima	Japan (JPN); Mana Endo; Nana Miyagi; Naoko Sawamatsu; Ai Sugiyama	Indonesia (INA); Yayuk Basuki; Natalia Soetrisno; Romana Tedjakusuma; Veronica Widyadharma	Chinese Taipei (TPE); Jane Chi; Ho Chiu-mei; Wang Shi-ting; Weng Tzu-ting
1998 Bangkok	Chinese Taipei (TPE); Hsu Hsueh-li; Janet Lee; Wang Shi-ting; Weng Tzu-ting	China (CHN); Chen Li; Li Fang; Li Li; Yi Jingqian	Indonesia (INA); Liza Andriyani; Yayuk Basuki; Irawati Moerid Iskandar; Wynne Prakusya
1998 Bangkok	Chinese Taipei (TPE); Hsu Hsueh-li; Janet Lee; Wang Shi-ting; Weng Tzu-ting	China (CHN); Chen Li; Li Fang; Li Li; Yi Jingqian	Japan (JPN); Rika Hiraki; Haruka Inoue; Nana Miyagi; Yuka Yoshida
2002 Busan	Indonesia (INA); Liza Andriyani; Wynne Prakusya; Wukirasih Sawondari; Angelique Widjaja	Japan (JPN); Shinobu Asagoe; Saori Obata; Miho Saeki; Yuka Yoshida	South Korea (KOR); Cho Yoon-jeong; Choi Young-ja; Chung Yang-jin; Jeon Mi-ra
2002 Busan	Indonesia (INA); Liza Andriyani; Wynne Prakusya; Wukirasih Sawondari; Angelique Widjaja	Japan (JPN); Shinobu Asagoe; Saori Obata; Miho Saeki; Yuka Yoshida	Chinese Taipei (TPE); Chan Chin-wei; Chuang Chia-jung; Hsieh Su-wei; Janet Lee
2006 Doha	Chinese Taipei (TPE); Chan Chin-wei; Latisha Chan; Chuang Chia-jung; Hsieh Su-wei	India (IND); Ankita Bhambri; Isha Lakhani; Sania Mirza; Shikha Uberoi	Japan (JPN); Ryoko Fuda; Akiko Morigami; Aiko Nakamura; Tomoko Yonemura
2006 Doha	Chinese Taipei (TPE); Chan Chin-wei; Latisha Chan; Chuang Chia-jung; Hsieh Su-wei	India (IND); Ankita Bhambri; Isha Lakhani; Sania Mirza; Shikha Uberoi	Uzbekistan (UZB); Akgul Amanmuradova; Albina Khabibulina; Dilyara Saidkhodjayeva; Iroda Tulyaganova
2010 Guangzhou	China (CHN); Li Na; Peng Shuai; Yan Zi; Zhang Shuai	Chinese Taipei (TPE); Latisha Chan; Chang Kai-chen; Chuang Chia-jung; Hsieh Su-wei	Japan (JPN); Kimiko Date-Krumm; Misaki Doi; Ryoko Fuda; Ayumi Morita
2010 Guangzhou	China (CHN); Li Na; Peng Shuai; Yan Zi; Zhang Shuai	Chinese Taipei (TPE); Latisha Chan; Chang Kai-chen; Chuang Chia-jung; Hsieh Su-wei	Thailand (THA); Noppawan Lertcheewakarn; Nudnida Luangnam; Tamarine Tanasugarn; Varatchaya Wongteanchai
2014 Incheon	Chinese Taipei (TPE); Chan Chin-wei; Chan Hao-ching; Latisha Chan; Hsieh Su-wei	China (CHN); Duan Yingying; Zhang Shuai; Zheng Jie; Zheng Saisai	Japan (JPN); Misa Eguchi; Eri Hozumi; Risa Ozaki
2014 Incheon	Chinese Taipei (TPE); Chan Chin-wei; Chan Hao-ching; Latisha Chan; Hsieh Su-wei	China (CHN); Duan Yingying; Zhang Shuai; Zheng Jie; Zheng Saisai	Kazakhstan (KAZ); Kamila Kerimbayeva; Yulia Putintseva; Yaroslava Shvedova

=== Mixed doubles ===
Games	Gold	Silver	Bronze
1958 Tokyo	Yoshihisa Shibata and Reiko Miyagi (JPN)	Miguel Dungo and Patricia Yngayo (PHI)	Felicisimo Ampon and Desideria Ampon (PHI)
1958 Tokyo	Yoshihisa Shibata and Reiko Miyagi (JPN)	Miguel Dungo and Patricia Yngayo (PHI)	Kao Teng-ko and Chan Shiuo-miang (ROC)
1962 Jakarta	Koji Watanabe and Akiko Fukui (JPN)	Michio Fujii and Reiko Miyagi (JPN)	Sofyan Mudjirat and Jooce Suwarimbo (INA)
1962 Jakarta	Koji Watanabe and Akiko Fukui (JPN)	Michio Fujii and Reiko Miyagi (JPN)	Miguel Dungo and Desideria Ampon (PHI)
1966 Bangkok	Koji Watanabe and Reiko Miyagi (JPN)	Federico Deyro and Patricia Yngayo (PHI)	Go Soen Houw and Lany Kaligis (INA)
1966 Bangkok	Koji Watanabe and Reiko Miyagi (JPN)	Federico Deyro and Patricia Yngayo (PHI)	Sutarjo Sugiarto and Lita Liem (INA)
1974 Tehran	Yair Wertheimer and Paulina Peisachov (ISR)	Xu Meilin and Zhang Ronghua (CHN)	Ryoichi Mori and Kimiyo Yagahara (JPN)
1978 Bangkok	Charuek Hengrasmee and Suthasini Sirikaya (THA)	Etsuo Uchiyama and Matsuko Matsushima (JPN)	Hadiman and Ayi Sutarno (INA)
1978 Bangkok	Charuek Hengrasmee and Suthasini Sirikaya (THA)	Etsuo Uchiyama and Matsuko Matsushima (JPN)	Shigeyuki Nishio and Kimiyo Hatanaka (JPN)
1982 New Delhi	Kim Choon-ho and Shin Soon-ho (KOR)	Ichiro Nakanishi and Etsuko Inoue (JPN)	Yoshitomo Onishi and Masako Yanagi (JPN)
1986 Seoul	Yoo Jin-sun and Lee Jeong-soon (KOR)	You Wei and Zhong Ni (CHN)	Tintus Arianto Wibowo and Suzanna Anggarkusuma (INA)
1990 Beijing	Hary Suharyadi and Yayuk Basuki (INA)	Yoo Jin-sun and Kim Il-soon (KOR)	Bonit Wiryawan and Suzanna Wibowo (INA)
1990 Beijing	Hary Suharyadi and Yayuk Basuki (INA)	Yoo Jin-sun and Kim Il-soon (KOR)	Vittaya Samrej and Orawan Thampensri (THA)
1994 Hiroshima	Xia Jiaping and Li Fang (CHN)	Ryuso Tsujino and Nana Miyagi (JPN)	Goichi Motomura and Kyoko Nagatsuka (JPN)
1994 Hiroshima	Xia Jiaping and Li Fang (CHN)	Ryuso Tsujino and Nana Miyagi (JPN)	Chang Eui-jong and Choi Ju-yeon (KOR)
1998 Bangkok	Satoshi Iwabuchi and Nana Miyagi (JPN)	Kim Dong-hyun and Choi Ju-yeon (KOR)	Li Si and Li Fang (CHN)
1998 Bangkok	Satoshi Iwabuchi and Nana Miyagi (JPN)	Kim Dong-hyun and Choi Ju-yeon (KOR)	Mahesh Bhupathi and Nirupama Vaidyanathan (IND)
2002 Busan	Lu Yen-hsun and Janet Lee (TPE)	Mahesh Bhupathi and Manisha Malhotra (IND)	Leander Paes and Sania Mirza (IND)
2002 Busan	Lu Yen-hsun and Janet Lee (TPE)	Mahesh Bhupathi and Manisha Malhotra (IND)	Oleg Ogorodov and Iroda Tulyaganova (UZB)
2006 Doha	Leander Paes and Sania Mirza (IND)	Satoshi Iwabuchi and Akiko Morigami (JPN)	Yu Xinyuan and Sun Tiantian (CHN)
2006 Doha	Leander Paes and Sania Mirza (IND)	Satoshi Iwabuchi and Akiko Morigami (JPN)	Lu Yen-hsun and Hsieh Su-wei (TPE)
2010 Guangzhou	Yang Tsung-hua and Latisha Chan (TPE)	Vishnu Vardhan and Sania Mirza (IND)	Hiroki Kondo and Yurika Sema (JPN)
2010 Guangzhou	Yang Tsung-hua and Latisha Chan (TPE)	Vishnu Vardhan and Sania Mirza (IND)	Sanchai Ratiwatana and Tamarine Tanasugarn (THA)
2014 Incheon	Saketh Myneni and Sania Mirza (IND)	Peng Hsien-yin and Chan Hao-ching (TPE)	Zhang Ze and Zheng Jie (CHN)
2014 Incheon	Saketh Myneni and Sania Mirza (IND)	Peng Hsien-yin and Chan Hao-ching (TPE)	Yuichi Sugita and Shuko Aoyama (JPN)
2018 Jakarta–Palembang	Christopher Rungkat and Aldila Sutjiadi (INA)	Sonchat Ratiwatana and Luksika Kumkhum (THA)	Kaito Uesugi and Erina Hayashi (JPN)
2018 Jakarta–Palembang	Christopher Rungkat and Aldila Sutjiadi (INA)	Sonchat Ratiwatana and Luksika Kumkhum (THA)	Aleksandr Nedovyesov and Anna Danilina (KAZ)
2022 Hangzhou	Rohan Bopanna and Rutuja Bhosale (IND)	Huang Tsung-hao and Liang En-shuo (TPE)	Francis Alcantara and Alexandra Eala (PHI)
2022 Hangzhou	Rohan Bopanna and Rutuja Bhosale (IND)	Huang Tsung-hao and Liang En-shuo (TPE)	Hsu Yu-hsiou and Chan Hao-ching (TPE)
2026 Aichi–Nagoya	Jay Friend and Ena Shibahara (JPN)	Yusuke Kusuhara and Shuko Aoyama (JPN)	Zhang Tianhui and Jiang Xinyu (CHN)
2026 Aichi–Nagoya	Jay Friend and Ena Shibahara (JPN)	Yusuke Kusuhara and Shuko Aoyama (JPN)	Tseng Chun-hsin and Hsieh Su-wei (TPE)
