= Tennis at the Asian Games =

Details of tennis played in the Asian Games

- Governing bodies: ITF (World) / ATF (Asia)
- Events: 5 (men: 2; women: 2; mixed: 1)

Games
- 1951; 1954; 1958; 1962; 1966; 1970; 1974; 1978; 1982; 1986; 1990; 1994; 1998; 2002; 2006; 2010; 2014; 2018; 2022; 2026
- Medalists

Tennis is part of the Asian Games program. It has been played at each edition of the games since 1958, with the exception of 1970. Men's and women's singles, men's and women's doubles, and mixed doubles have been contested each time. Men's and women's team events have been contested since 1962.

== Editions ==
Games	Year	Host city	Best nation
III	1958	Tokyo, Japan	Japan
IV	1962	Jakarta, Indonesia	Japan
V	1966	Bangkok, Thailand	Japan
VII	1974	Tehran, Iran	Japan
VIII	1978	Bangkok, Thailand	Indonesia
IX	1982	New Delhi, India	South Korea
X	1986	Seoul, South Korea	South Korea
XI	1990	Beijing, China	China
XII	1994	Hiroshima, Japan	Japan
XIII	1998	Bangkok, Thailand	South Korea
XIV	2002	Busan, South Korea	South Korea
XV	2006	Doha, Qatar	India
XVI	2010	Guangzhou, China	Chinese Taipei
XVII	2014	Incheon, South Korea	Chinese Taipei
XVIII	2018	Jakarta–Palembang, Indonesia	China
XIX	2022	Hangzhou, China	Chinese Taipei
XX	2026	Aichi–Nagoya, Japan	Japan

== Events ==
Event	58	62	66	74	78	82	86	90	94	98	02	06	10	14	18	22	26	Years
Men's singles	X	X	X	X	X	X	X	X	X	X	X	X	X	X	X	X	X	17
Men's doubles	X	X	X	X	X	X	X	X	X	X	X	X	X	X	X	X	X	17
Men's team		X	X	X	X	X	X	X	X	X	X	X	X	X				13
Women's singles	X	X	X	X	X	X	X	X	X	X	X	X	X	X	X	X	X	17
Women's doubles	X	X	X	X	X	X	X	X	X	X	X	X	X	X	X	X	X	17
Women's team		X	X	X	X	X	X	X	X	X	X	X	X	X				13
Mixed doubles	X	X	X	X	X	X	X	X	X	X	X	X	X	X	X	X	X	17
Total	5	7	7	7	7	7	7	7	7	7	7	7	7	7	5	5	5	

== Medal table ==
Rank	Nation	Gold	Silver	Bronze	Total
1	Japan (JPN)	29	20	48	97
2	China (CHN)	18	22	22	62
3	South Korea (KOR)	16	22	21	59
4	Indonesia (INA)	15	5	22	42
5	Chinese Taipei (TPE)	10	10	14	34
6	India (IND)	10	7	17	34
7	Thailand (THA)	5	6	11	22
8	Philippines (PHI)	3	9	17	29
9	Uzbekistan (UZB)	2	3	8	13
10	Kazakhstan (KAZ)	1	1	5	7
11	Hong Kong (HKG)	1	1	1	3
11	Israel (ISR)	1	1	1	3
13	Iran (IRI)	0	2	2	4
14	Sri Lanka (SRI)	0	1	4	5
15	Pakistan (PAK)	0	1	2	3
16	Vietnam (VIE)	0	1	1	2
17	Malaysia (MAS)	0	0	2	2
Totals (17 entries)		111	112	198	421

== Finals ==
=== Men's singles ===
Year	Champions	Runners-up	Score
1958	Raymundo Deyro (PHI)	Felicisimo Ampon (PHI)	6–4, 9–7, 4–6, 7–5
1962	Johnny Jose (PHI)	Atsushi Miyagi (JPN)	7–5, 6–3, 6–2
1966	Osamu Ishiguro (JPN)	Ichizo Konishi (JPN)	4–6, 6–3, 1–6, 6–4, 6–1
1974	Toshiro Sakai (JPN)	Taghi Akbari (IRN)	3–6, 6–4, 6–0, 7–5
1978	Atet Wijono (INA)	Shigeyuki Nishio (JPN)	7–6, 6–2
1982	Yustedjo Tarik (INA)	Kim Choon-ho (KOR)	6–3, 6–7^{(0–7)}, 6–3
1986	Yoo Jin-sun (KOR)	Kim Bong-soo (KOR)	6–0, 4–6, 6–3
1990	Pan Bing (CHN)	Zhang Jiuhua (CHN)	1–6, 7–6^{(7–4)}, 6–1
1994	Pan Bing (CHN)	Yoon Yong-il (KOR)	6–2, 6–1
1998	Yoon Yong-il (KOR)	Satoshi Iwabuchi (JPN)	5–7, 6–4, 6–3, 6–2
2002	Paradorn Srichaphan (THA)	Lee Hyung-taik (KOR)	7–6^{(7–3)}, 6–4
2006	Danai Udomchoke (THA)	Lee Hyung-taik (KOR)	7–5, 6–3
2010	Somdev Devvarman (IND)	Denis Istomin (UZB)	6–1, 6–2
2014	Yoshihito Nishioka (JPN)	Lu Yen-hsun (TPE)	6–2, 6–2
2018	Denis Istomin (UZB)	Wu Yibing (CHN)	2–6, 6–2, 7–6^{(7–2)}
2022	Zhang Zhizhen (CHN)	Yosuke Watanuki (JPN)	6–4, 7–6^{(9–7)}
2026	Coleman Wong (HKG)	Wu Yibing (CHN)	6–2, 6–4

=== Women's singles ===
Year	Champions	Runners-up	Score
1958	Sachiko Kamo (JPN)	Desideria Ampon (PHI)	6–1, 6–2
1962	Akiko Fukui (JPN)	Reiko Miyagi (JPN)	7–5, 6–2
1966	Lany Kaligis (INA)	Kazuko Kuromatsu (JPN)	6–2, 6–3
1974	Lita Sugiarto (INA)	Paulina Peisachov (ISR)	7–6, 6–4
1978	Lee Duk-hee (KOR)	Chen Juan (CHN)	6–3, 6–1
1982	Etsuko Inoue (JPN)	Kim Soo-ok (KOR)	4–6, 6–4, 6–4
1986	Li Xinyi (CHN)	Lee Jeong-soon (KOR)	6–3, 6–3
1990	Akiko Kijimuta (JPN)	Chen Li (CHN)	6–3, 6–3
1994	Kimiko Date (JPN)	Naoko Sawamatsu (JPN)	6–2, 6–4
1998	Yayuk Basuki (INA)	Tamarine Tanasugarn (THA)	6–4, 6–2
2002	Iroda Tulyaganova (UZB)	Tamarine Tanasugarn (THA)	6–1, 6–3
2006	Zheng Jie (CHN)	Sania Mirza (IND)	6–4, 1–6, 6–1
2010	Peng Shuai (CHN)	Akgul Amanmuradova (UZB)	7–5, 6–2
2014	Wang Qiang (CHN)	Luksika Kumkhum (THA)	6–2, 7–6^{(7–5)}
2018	Wang Qiang (CHN)	Zhang Shuai (CHN)	6–3, 6–2
2022	Zheng Qinwen (CHN)	Zhu Lin (CHN)	6–2, 6–4
2026	Wang Xiyu (CHN)	Zhang Shuai (CHN)	6–2, 6–1

=== Men's doubles ===
Year	Champions	Runners-up	Score
1958	Felicisimo Ampon (PHI); Raymundo Deyro (PHI)	Johnny Jose (PHI); Miguel Dungo (PHI)	6–2, 4–6, 7–9, 7–5, 10–8
1962	Atsushi Miyagi (JPN); Michio Fujii (JPN)	Johnny Jose (PHI); Raymundo Deyro (PHI)	9–7, 4–6, 6–4, 6–1
1966	Osamu Ishiguro (JPN); Koji Watanabe (JPN)	Võ Văn Bảy (VNM); Lưu Hoàng Đức (VNM)	2–6, 5–7, 8–6, 16–14, 6–3
1974	Toshiro Sakai (JPN); Kenichi Hirai (JPN)	Ali Madani (IRN); Kambiz Derafshijavan (IRN)	6–0, 6–0, 6–4
1978	Yustedjo Tarik (INA); Hadiman (INA)	Xu Meilin (CHN); Gu Minghua (CHN)	6–3, 6–4
1982	Kim Choon-ho (KOR); Lee Woo-ryong (KOR)	Song Dong-wook (KOR); Jeon Yeong-dae (KOR)	6–3, 7–5
1986	Yoo Jin-sun (KOR); Kim Bong-soo (KOR)	Ma Keqin (CHN); Liu Shuhua (CHN)	3–6, 6–4, 17–15
1990	Xia Jiaping (CHN); Meng Qianghua (CHN)	Liu Shuhua (CHN); Pan Bing (CHN)	6–4, 6–3
1994	Leander Paes (IND); Gaurav Natekar (IND)	Chang Eui-jong (KOR); Kim Chi-wan (KOR)	6–4, 7–5
1998	Paradorn Srichaphan (THA); Narathorn Srichaphan (THA)	Lee Hyung-taik (KOR); Yoon Yong-il (KOR)	6–3, 7–6^{(7–5)}
2002	Leander Paes (IND); Mahesh Bhupathi (IND)	Chung Hee-seok (KOR); Lee Hyung-taik (KOR)	6–2, 6–3
2006	Leander Paes (IND); Mahesh Bhupathi (IND)	Sanchai Ratiwatana (THA); Sonchat Ratiwatana (THA)	5–7, 7–6^{(9–7)}, 6–3
2010	Somdev Devvarman (IND); Sanam Singh (IND)	Gong Maoxin (CHN); Li Zhe (CHN)	6–3, 6–7^{(4–7)}, [10–8]
2014	Chung Hyeon (KOR); Lim Yong-kyu (KOR)	Saketh Myneni (IND); Sanam Singh (IND)	7–5, 7–6^{(7–2)}
2018	Rohan Bopanna (IND); Divij Sharan (IND)	Alexander Bublik (KAZ); Denis Yevseyev (KAZ)	6–3, 6–4
2022	Hsu Yu-hsiou (TPE); Jason Jung (TPE)	Saketh Myneni (IND); Ramkumar Ramanathan (IND)	6–4, 6–4
2026	Yusuke Kusuhara (JPN); Shunsuke Nakagawa (JPN)	Nam Ji-sung (KOR); Park Ui-sung (KOR)	6–3, 7–6^{(7–4)}

=== Women's doubles ===
Year	Champions	Runners-up	Score
1958	Sachiko Kamo (JPN); Reiko Miyagi (JPN)	Desideria Ampon (PHI); Patricia Yngayo (PHI)	6–2, 6–2
1962	Reiko Miyagi (JPN); Akiko Fukui (JPN)	Ranjani Jayasuriya (CEY); Tsui Yuen Yuen (HKG)	6–4, 6–2
1966	Lita Liem (INA); Lany Kaligis (INA)	Desideria Ampon (PHI); Patricia Yngayo (PHI)	6–4, 3–6, 6–1
1974	Toshiko Sade (JPN); Kayoko Fukuoka (JPN)	Lee Soon-oh (KOR); Lee Duk-hee (KOR)	6–4, 2–6, 6–3
1978	Lee Duk-hee (KOR); Yang Jeong-soon (KOR)	Kimiyo Hatanaka (JPN); Kiyoko Nomura (JPN)	
1982	Shin Soon-ho (KOR); Kim Nam-sook (KOR)	Junko Kimura (JPN); Kazuko Ito (JPN)	6–3, 6–2
1986	Suzanna Anggarkusuma (INA); Yayuk Basuki (INA)	Lee Jeong-soon (KOR); Kim Il-soon (KOR)	6–3, 6–7^{(4–7)}, 6–4
1990	Yayuk Basuki (INA); Suzanna Wibowo (INA)	Lee Jeong-myung (KOR); Kim Il-soon (KOR)	6–2, 6–1
1994	Kyoko Nagatsuka (JPN); Ai Sugiyama (JPN)	Li Fang (CHN); Chen Li (CHN)	6–2, 6–1
1998	Li Fang (CHN); Chen Li (CHN)	Cho Yoon-jeong (KOR); Park Sung-hee (KOR)	6–2, 7–6^{(7–2)}
2002	Kim Mi-ok (KOR); Choi Young-ja (KOR)	Wynne Prakusya (INA); Angelique Widjaja (INA)	7–6^{(7–4)}, 1–6, 6–3
2006	Zheng Jie (CHN); Yan Zi (CHN)	Latisha Chan (TPE); Chuang Chia-jung (TPE)	6–1, 7–6^{(7–5)}
2010	Latisha Chan (TPE); Chuang Chia-jung (TPE)	Chang Kai-chen (TPE); Hsieh Su-wei (TPE)	7–5, 6–3
2014	Luksika Kumkhum (THA); Tamarine Tanasugarn (THA)	Hsieh Su-wei (TPE); Chan Chin-wei (TPE)	5–7, 6–3, [10–3]
2018	Xu Yifan (CHN); Yang Zhaoxuan (CHN)	Chan Hao-ching (TPE); Latisha Chan (TPE)	6–2, 1–6, [11–9]
2022	Chan Hao-ching (TPE); Latisha Chan (TPE)	Lee Ya-hsuan (TPE); Liang En-shuo (TPE)	6–4, 6–3
2026	Hsieh Su-wei (TPE); Liang En-shuo (TPE)	Chan Hao-ching (TPE); Wu Fang-hsien (TPE)	6–4, 4–6, [10–5]

=== Mixed doubles ===
Year	Champions	Runners-up	Score
1958	Yoshihisa Shibata (JPN); Reiko Miyagi (JPN)	Miguel Dungo (PHI); Patricia Yngayo (PHI)	3–6, 7–5, 6–4
1962	Koji Watanabe (JPN); Akiko Fukui (JPN)	Michio Fujii (JPN); Reiko Miyagi (JPN)	3–3, Retired
1966	Koji Watanabe (JPN); Reiko Miyagi (JPN)	Federico Deyro (PHI); Patricia Yngayo (PHI)	4–6, 8–6, 6–2
1974	Yair Wertheimer (ISR); Paulina Peisachov (ISR)	Xu Meilin (CHN); Zhang Ronghua (CHN)	Walkover
1978	Charuek Hengrasmee (THA); Suthasini Sirikaya (THA)	Etsuo Uchiyama (JPN); Matsuko Matsushima (JPN)	6–2, 4–6, 6–2
1982	Kim Choon-ho (KOR); Shin Soon-ho (KOR)	Ichiro Nakanishi (JPN); Etsuko Inoue (JPN)	6–3, 6–1
1986	Yoo Jin-sun (KOR); Lee Jeong-soon (KOR)	You Wei (CHN); Zhong Ni (CHN)	7–6^{(7–5)}, 6–1
1990	Hary Suharyadi (INA); Yayuk Basuki (INA)	Yoo Jin-sun (KOR); Kim Il-soon (KOR)	6–3, 3–6, 6–3
1994	Xia Jiaping (CHN); Li Fang (CHN)	Ryuso Tsujino (JPN); Nana Miyagi (JPN)	7–6, 7–5
1998	Satoshi Iwabuchi (JPN); Nana Miyagi (JPN)	Kim Dong-hyun (KOR); Choi Ju-yeon (KOR)	7–5, 7–5
2002	Lu Yen-hsun (TPE); Janet Lee (TPE)	Mahesh Bhupathi (IND); Manisha Malhotra (IND)	4–6, 6–3, 9–7
2006	Leander Paes (IND); Sania Mirza (IND)	Satoshi Iwabuchi (JPN); Akiko Morigami (JPN)	7–5, 5–7, 6–2
2010	Yang Tsung-hua (TPE); Latisha Chan (TPE)	Vishnu Vardhan (IND); Sania Mirza (IND)	4–6, 6–1, [10–2]
2014	Saketh Myneni (IND); Sania Mirza (IND)	Peng Hsien-yin (TPE); Chan Hao-ching (TPE)	6–4, 6–3
2018	Christopher Rungkat (INA); Aldila Sutjiadi (INA)	Sonchat Ratiwatana (THA); Luksika Kumkhum (THA)	6–4, 5–7, [10–7]
2022	Rohan Bopanna (IND); Rutuja Bhosale (IND)	Huang Tsung-hao (TPE); Liang En-shuo (TPE)	2–6, 6–3, [10–4]
2026	Jay Friend (JPN); Ena Shibahara (JPN)	Yusuke Kusuhara (JPN); Shuko Aoyama (JPN)	6–3, 6–4
