= Tennis at the 1958 Asian Games – Men's singles =

Men's singles at the 1958 Asian Games
- Venue: New National Tennis Courts
- Dates: 25–30 May 1958
- Competitors: 48 from 15 nations

Medalists
gold medal	Raymundo Deyro	Philippines
silver medal	Felicisimo Ampon	Philippines
bronze medal	Johnny Jose	Philippines
bronze medal	Miguel Dungo	Philippines

Men's singles
- Tennis at the 1958 Asian Games

Events
Singles	men	women
Doubles	men	women	mixed
- Asian Games

The men's singles tennis event was part of the tennis programme and took place between 25 and 30 May 1958, at the New National Tennis Courts.

== Schedule ==
All times are Japan Standard Time (UTC+09:00)

Date	Time	Event
Sunday, 25 May 1958	10:30	1st round
Sunday, 25 May 1958	10:30	2nd round
Monday, 26 May 1958	10:00	3rd round
Tuesday, 27 May 1958	10:00	4th round
Wednesday, 28 May 1958	11:30	Semifinals
Friday, 30 May 1958	12:00	Final

== Results ==
Legend

- WO — Won by walkover

=== Finals ===
Semifinals				Final
Raymundo Deyro (PHI)	3	6	9
Johnny Jose (PHI)	6	4	7	Raymundo Deyro (PHI)	6	9	4	7
Miguel Dungo (PHI)	6	2	1	Felicisimo Ampon (PHI)	4	7	6	5
Felicisimo Ampon (PHI)	3	6	6

=== Top half ===
==== Section 1 ====
1st round
Ang Sam (ROC)	0	4
Susumu Matsuura (JPN)	6	6

2nd round
Raymundo Deyro (PHI)	6	6
Tsui Wai Pui (HKG)	3	1
George Aftandilian (IRN)	2	2
Bernard Pinto (CEY)	6	6
Lee Sang-ryun (KOR)	6	6
Kravee Sudasna (THA)	4	0
Lim Hee Chin (SIN)	0	1
Susumu Matsuura (JPN)	6	6

3rd round
Raymundo Deyro (PHI)	8	6
Bernard Pinto (CEY)	6	1
Lee Sang-ryun (KOR)	3	4
Susumu Matsuura (JPN)	6	6

4th round
Raymundo Deyro (PHI)	0	6	6
Susumu Matsuura (JPN)	6	1	3

==== Section 2 ====
1st round
Võ Văn Thành (VNM)	4	6	8
Khong Kit Soon (SIN)	6	4	6
Osamu Ishiguro (JPN)	6	6
Enoud Jasemzadeh (IRN)	0	2
Sie Kong Loen (INA)	W	O
Shail Kumar Upadhyaya (NEP)
Lee Sang-hoon (KOR)	4	5
Saeed Haye (PAK)	6	7
Sultan Aman Azman (MAL)	1	1
Dao Kwan Chieu (HKG)	6	6
Lin Yeong-yuan (ROC)	6	6
Raja Praesody (CEY)	2	3
Suthep Bulakul (THA)	4	3
A. G. B. Pakir (SIN)	6	6
Nguyễn Văn Tịch (VNM)	1	1
Johnny Jose (PHI)	6	6

2nd round
Võ Văn Thành (VNM)	0	2
Osamu Ishiguro (JPN)	6	6
Sie Kong Loen (INA)	0	3
Saeed Haye (PAK)	6	6
Dao Kwan Chieu (HKG)	6	6
Lin Yeong-yuan (ROC)	3	1
A. G. B. Pakir (SIN)	0	1
Johnny Jose (PHI)	6	6

3rd round
Osamu Ishiguro (JPN)	6	8
Saeed Haye (PAK)	2	6
Dao Kwan Chieu (HKG)	2	2
Johnny Jose (PHI)	6	6

4th round
Osamu Ishiguro (JPN)	3	3
Johnny Jose (PHI)	6	6

=== Bottom half ===
==== Section 3 ====
1st round
Kosei Kamo (JPN)
S. H. Samsi (INA)	W	O
Munir Pirzada (PAK)	W	O
Singh Bahadur Basnyat (NEP)
Ip Koon Hung (HKG)	6	6
Võ Văn Bảy (VNM)	1	3
Boonchob Seeboonruang (THA)	2	1
Rupert Ferdinands (CEY)	6	6
Ong Chew Bee (SIN)	8	7
Kao Teng-ko (ROC)	6	5
Kil In-hyung (KOR)	6	6
Joe Ba Maung (BIR)	1	1
Henry Johanes (IRN)	1	2
Miguel Dungo (PHI)	6	6
Sutarjo Sugiarto (INA)	4	2
Moses Tay (MAL)	6	6

2nd round
S. H. Samsi (INA)	6	4	8
Munir Pirzada (PAK)	1	6	6
Ip Koon Hung (HKG)	3	4
Rupert Ferdinands (CEY)	6	6
Ong Chew Bee (SIN)	6	7
Kil In-hyung (KOR)	4	5
Miguel Dungo (PHI)	6	6
Moses Tay (MAL)	2	2

3rd round
S. H. Samsi (INA)	1	4
Rupert Ferdinands (CEY)	6	6
Ong Chew Bee (SIN)	2	3
Miguel Dungo (PHI)	6	6

4th round
Rupert Ferdinands (CEY)	3	3
Miguel Dungo (PHI)	6	6

==== Section 4 ====
1st round

2nd round
Suthephun Karalakshana (THA)	6	6
Um Hwa-yong (KOR)	1	1
Steve Lee (ROC)	1	2
Yoshihisa Shibata (JPN)	6	6
Edwin Tsai (HKG)	7	6	6
Arsham Yasaei (IRN)	9	2	1
Bye
Felicisimo Ampon (PHI)

3rd round
Suthephun Karalakshana (THA)	7	1	4
Yoshihisa Shibata (JPN)	5	6	6
Edwin Tsai (HKG)	5	3
Felicisimo Ampon (PHI)	7	6

4th round
Yoshihisa Shibata (JPN)	0	5
Felicisimo Ampon (PHI)	6	7
