= Tennis at the 1958 Asian Games – Men's doubles =

Men's doubles at the 1958 Asian Games
- Venue: New National Tennis Courts
- Dates: 26–29 May 1958
- Competitors: 46 from 14 nations

Medalists
gold medal	Felicisimo Ampon; Raymundo Deyro	Philippines
silver medal	Johnny Jose; Miguel Dungo	Philippines
bronze medal	Rupert Ferdinands; Bernard Pinto	Ceylon
bronze medal	Võ Văn Bảy; Võ Văn Thành	South Vietnam

Men's doubles
- Tennis at the 1958 Asian Games

Events
Singles	men	women
Doubles	men	women	mixed
- Asian Games

The men's doubles tennis event was part of the tennis programme and took place between 26 and 29 May 1958, at the New National Tennis Courts.

== Schedule ==
All times are Japan Standard Time (UTC+09:00)

Date	Time	Event
Monday, 26 May 1958	13:00	1st round
Monday, 26 May 1958	13:00	2nd round
Tuesday, 27 May 1958	13:00	3rd round
Wednesday, 28 May 1958	13:00	Semifinals
Thursday, 29 May 1958	12:00	Final

== Results ==
Legend

- WO — Won by walkover

=== Final ===
Final
Felicisimo Ampon (PHI); Raymundo Deyro (PHI)	6	4	7	7	10
Johnny Jose (PHI); Miguel Dungo (PHI)	2	6	9	5	8

=== Top half ===
1st round
Rupert Ferdinands (CEY); Bernard Pinto (CEY)	7	6
Ang Sam (ROC); Kao Teng-ko (ROC)	5	4
Kil In-hyung (KOR); Um Hwa-yong (KOR)	W	O
Nguyễn Văn Tịch (VNM); Nguyễn Văn Nữa (VNM)
George Aftandilian (IRN); Enoud Jasemzadeh (IRN)	9	4	0
Lim Hee Chin (SIN); A. G. B. Pakir (SIN)	7	6	6
Shail Kumar Upadhyaya (NEP); Singh Bahadur Basnyat (NEP)
Osamu Ishiguro (JPN); Susumu Matsuura (JPN)	W	O

2nd round
Felicisimo Ampon (PHI); Raymundo Deyro (PHI)	6	6
Suthep Bulakul (THA); Boonchob Seeboonruang (THA)	1	0
Moses Tay (MAL); Sultan Aman Azman (MAL)	1	3
Ip Koon Hung (HKG); Edwin Tsai (HKG)	6	6
Rupert Ferdinands (CEY); Bernard Pinto (CEY)	6	6
Kil In-hyung (KOR); Um Hwa-yong (KOR)	1	3
Lim Hee Chin (SIN); A. G. B. Pakir (SIN)	1	2
Osamu Ishiguro (JPN); Susumu Matsuura (JPN)	6	6

3rd round
Felicisimo Ampon (PHI); Raymundo Deyro (PHI)	7	6
Ip Koon Hung (HKG); Edwin Tsai (HKG)	5	1
Rupert Ferdinands (CEY); Bernard Pinto (CEY)	5	6	6
Osamu Ishiguro (JPN); Susumu Matsuura (JPN)	7	3	3

Semifinals
Felicisimo Ampon (PHI); Raymundo Deyro (PHI)	6	6
Rupert Ferdinands (CEY); Bernard Pinto (CEY)	3	1

=== Bottom half ===
1st round
Johnny Jose (PHI); Miguel Dungo (PHI)	6	6
Munir Pirzada (PAK); Saeed Haye (PAK)	1	1
Lee Sang-ryun (KOR); Lee Sang-hoon (KOR)	9	7
Lin Yeong-yuan (ROC); Steve Lee (ROC)	7	5
Suthephun Karalakshana (THA); Kravee Sudasna (THA)	8	2
Ong Chew Bee (SIN); Khong Kit Soon (SIN)	10	6

2nd round
Johnny Jose (PHI); Miguel Dungo (PHI)	6	6
Dao Kwan Chieu (HKG); Tsui Wai Pui (HKG)	1	2
Lee Sang-ryun (KOR); Lee Sang-hoon (KOR)	0	0
Ong Chew Bee (SIN); Khong Kit Soon (SIN)	6	6
Võ Văn Bảy (VNM); Võ Văn Thành (VNM)	7	6	6
Henry Johanes (IRN); Arsham Yasaei (IRN)	9	4	2
Sutarjo Sugiarto (INA); Sie Kong Loen (INA)	W	O
Kosei Kamo (JPN); Yoshihisa Shibata (JPN)

3rd round
Johnny Jose (PHI); Miguel Dungo (PHI)	6	6
Ong Chew Bee (SIN); Khong Kit Soon (SIN)	1	4
Võ Văn Bảy (VNM); Võ Văn Thành (VNM)	6	6
Sutarjo Sugiarto (INA); Sie Kong Loen (INA)	4	4

Semifinals
Johnny Jose (PHI); Miguel Dungo (PHI)	6	6
Võ Văn Bảy (VNM); Võ Văn Thành (VNM)	3	1
