= Tennis at the 1958 Asian Games – Mixed doubles =

Mixed doubles at the 1958 Asian Games
- Venue: New National Tennis Courts
- Dates: 27–30 May 1958
- Competitors: 24 from 6 nations

Medalists
gold medal	Yoshihisa Shibata; Reiko Miyagi	Japan
silver medal	Miguel Dungo; Patricia Yngayo	Philippines
bronze medal	Kao Teng-ko; Chan Shiuo-miang	Republic of China
bronze medal	Felicisimo Ampon; Desideria Ampon	Philippines

Mixed doubles
- Tennis at the 1958 Asian Games

Events
Singles	men	women
Doubles	men	women	mixed
Asian Games

The mixed doubles tennis event was part of the tennis programme and took place between 27 and 30 May 1958, at the New National Tennis Courts.

Yoshihisa Shibata and Reiko Miyagi from Japan won the gold medal.

== Schedule ==
All times are Japan Standard Time (UTC+09:00)

Date	Time	Event
Tuesday, 27 May 1958	15:30	1st round
Wednesday, 28 May 1958	14:30	2nd round
Thursday, 29 May 1958	15:00	Semifinals
Friday, 30 May 1958	15:00	Final

== Results ==
Legend

- WO — Won by walkover

1st round
Ip Koon Hung (HKG); Ip Wai Pun (HKG)	3	6	6
Moses Tay (MAL); Gladys Loke (MAL)	6	3	2
Sutarjo Sugiarto (INA); Vonny Djoa (INA)	1	0
Miguel Dungo (PHI); Patricia Yngayo (PHI)	6	6
Yoshihisa Shibata (JPN); Reiko Miyagi (JPN)	6	6
Edwin Tsai (HKG); Tsui Yuen Yuen (HKG)	2	3
Sie Kong Loen (INA); Tuty Pandji (INA)	1	2
Ang Sam (ROC); Liu Shang-ku (ROC)	6	6

2nd round
Kosei Kamo (JPN); Sachiko Kamo (JPN)
Kao Teng-ko (ROC); Chan Shiuo-miang (ROC)	W	O
Ip Koon Hung (HKG); Ip Wai Pun (HKG)	3	6	2
Miguel Dungo (PHI); Patricia Yngayo (PHI)	6	4	6
Yoshihisa Shibata (JPN); Reiko Miyagi (JPN)	6	6
Ang Sam (ROC); Liu Shang-ku (ROC)	4	0
Sultan Aman Azman (MAL); Katherine Leong (MAL)	0	0
Felicisimo Ampon (PHI); Desideria Ampon (PHI)	6	6

Semifinals
Kao Teng-ko (ROC); Chan Shiuo-miang (ROC)	3	3
Miguel Dungo (PHI); Patricia Yngayo (PHI)	6	6
Yoshihisa Shibata (JPN); Reiko Miyagi (JPN)	6	6	6
Felicisimo Ampon (PHI); Desideria Ampon (PHI)	4	8	4

Final
Miguel Dungo (PHI); Patricia Yngayo (PHI)	6	5	4
Yoshihisa Shibata (JPN); Reiko Miyagi (JPN)	3	7	6
