= 1962 Davis Cup Eastern Zone =

International tennis competition

The Eastern Zone was one of the three regional zones of the 1962 Davis Cup.

8 teams entered the Eastern Zone, with the winner going on to compete in the Inter-Zonal Zone against the winners of the America Zone and Europe Zone. India defeated the Philippines in the final and progressed to the Inter-Zonal Zone.

== Draw ==
Quarterfinals; 17 March–8 April
Lahore, Pakistan
India	5
Pakistan	0
Tehran, Iran
Iran	3
Malaya	2
Seoul, South Korea
South Korea	0
Japan	5
Colombo, Ceylon (clay)
Ceylon	0
Philippines	4

Semifinals; 13–16 April
Jaipur, India
India	4
Iran	0
Manila, Philippines
Japan	2
Philippines	3

Final; 4–6 May
New Delhi, India
India	5
Philippines	0

== Quarterfinals ==
=== Pakistan vs. India ===
Pakistan
0
Lahore, Pakistan
31 March–2 April 1962

India
5

			1	2	3	4	5
1	(Pakistan) (India)	Munir Pirzada; Premjit Lall	3; 6	1; 6	2; 6
2	(Pakistan) (India)	Khwaja Saeed Hai; Ramanathan Krishnan	4; 6	2; 6	2; 6
3	(Pakistan) (India)	Khan-Iftikhar Ahmed / Mohammed Naaem; Akhtar Ali / Premjit Lall	7; 9	2; 6	5; 7
4	(Pakistan) (India)	Khwaja Saeed Hai; Premjit Lall	6; 8	1; 6	3; 6
5	(Pakistan) (India)	Munir Pirzada; Akhtar Ali	2; 6	5; 7	6; 4	4; 6

=== Iran vs. Malaya ===
Iran
3
Tehran, Iran
6–8 April 1962

Malaya
2

			1	2	3	4	5
1	(Iran) (Federation of Malaya)	Reza Akbari; Sultan-Aman Azman	3; 6	1; 6				retired
2	(Iran) (Federation of Malaya)	Taghi Akbari; Billy Yap	6; 0	6; 2	6; 1
3	(Iran) (Federation of Malaya)	Taghi Akbari / Arsham Yassai; Sultan-Aman Azman / Billy Yap	6; 0	10; 8	3; 6	6; 3
4	(Iran) (Federation of Malaya)	Reza Akbari; Billy Yap	4; 6	6; 3	5; 7	4; 6
5	(Iran) (Federation of Malaya)	Taghi Akbari; Sultan-Aman Azman	10; 8	6; 3	5; 7	6; 0

=== South Korea vs. Japan ===
South Korea
0
Seoul, South Korea
30 March–1 April 1962

Japan
5

			1	2	3	4	5
1	(South Korea) (Japan)	Lee Sang-yun; Osamu Ishiguro	3; 6	1; 6	6; 4	2; 6
2	(South Korea) (Japan)	Chung Yong-ho; Michio Fujii	3; 6	0; 6	0; 6
3	(South Korea) (Japan)	Chung Yong-ho / Lee Sang-yun; Michio Fujii / Osamu Ishiguro	0; 6	2; 6	3; 6
4	(South Korea) (Japan)	Kim Doo-hwan; Michio Fujii	0; 6	3; 6	3; 6
5	(South Korea) (Japan)	Lee Tong-won; Seikichi Suga	4; 6	2; 6	1; 6

=== Ceylon vs. Philippines ===
Ceylon
0
Ceylon Lawn Tennis Association, Colombo, Ceylon
17–19 March 1962
Clay

Philippines
4

			1	2	3	4	5
1	(Dominion of Ceylon) (Philippines)	Bernard Pinto; Juan-Johnson José	2; 6	1; 6	4; 6
2	(Dominion of Ceylon) (Philippines)	Raja Praesody; Raymundo Deyro	4; 6	4; 6	2; 6
3	(Dominion of Ceylon) (Philippines)	Bernard Pinto / Raja Praesody; Raymundo Deyro / Juan-Johnson José	2; 6	1; 6	2; 6
4	(Dominion of Ceylon) (Philippines)	Senaka Kumara; Eduardo Dungo	2; 6	7; 5	3; 6	0; 6
5	(Dominion of Ceylon) (Philippines)	Raja Praesody; Juan-Johnson José	0; 5					not completed

== Semifinals ==
=== India vs. Iran ===
India
4
Jaipur, India
14–16 April 1962

Iran
0

			1	2	3	4	5
1	(India) (Iran)	Premjit Lall; Reza Akbari	6; 1	6; 2	6; 0
2	(India) (Iran)	Jaidip Mukerjea; Taghi Akbari	6; 0	6; 2	6; 4
3	(India) (Iran)	Premjit Lall / Jaidip Mukerjea; Taghi Akbari / Arsham Yassai	6; 3	6; 2	6; 2
4	(India) (Iran)	Akhtar Ali; Reza Akbari	6; 0	6; 2	6; 2
5	(India) (Iran)	Premjit Lall; Taghi Akbari	6; 4					not completed

=== Philippines vs. Japan ===
Philippines
3
Manila, Philippines
13–15 April 1962

Japan
2

			1	2	3	4	5
1	(Philippines) (Japan)	Raymundo Deyro; Atsushi Miyagi	1; 6	6; 1	4; 6	2; 6
2	(Philippines) (Japan)	Juan-Johnson José; Osamu Ishiguro	7; 5	6; 2	6; 3
3	(Philippines) (Japan)	Raymundo Deyro / Juan-Johnson José; Michio Fujii / Atsushi Miyagi	6; 3	6; 3	6; 4
4	(Philippines) (Japan)	Raymundo Deyro; Osamu Ishiguro	6; 1	6; 2	7; 5
5	(Philippines) (Japan)	Eduardo Dungo; Michio Fujii	2; 6	0; 6	1; 6

== Final ==
=== India vs. Philippines ===
India
5
New Delhi, India
4–6 May 1962

Philippines
0

			1	2	3	4	5
1	(India) (Philippines)	Jaidip Mukerjea; Juan-Johnson José	9; 11	7; 5	6; 0	6; 4
2	(India) (Philippines)	Ramanathan Krishnan; Felicisimo Ampon	6; 1	8; 6	6; 1
3	(India) (Philippines)	Premjit Lall / Jaidip Mukerjea; Raymundo Deyro / Juan-Johnson José	6; 4	3; 6	9; 7	6; 1
4	(India) (Philippines)	Premjit Lall; Juan-Johnson José	6; 3	6; 1	6; 0
5	(India) (Philippines)	Jaidip Mukerjea; Felicisimo Ampon	6; 1	6; 3	3; 6	6; 1
