= Tennis at the 1958 Asian Games – Women's singles =

Women's singles at the 1958 Asian Games
- Venue: New National Tennis Courts
- Dates: 25–29 May 1958
- Competitors: 12 from 6 nations

Medalists
gold medal	Sachiko Kamo	Japan
silver medal	Desideria Ampon	Philippines
bronze medal	Liu Shang-ku	Republic of China
bronze medal	Reiko Miyagi	Japan

Women's singles
- Tennis at the 1958 Asian Games

Events
Singles	men	women
Doubles	men	women	mixed
- Asian Games

The women's singles tennis event was part of the tennis programme and took place between 25 and 29 May 1958, at the New National Tennis Courts.

== Schedule ==
All times are Japan Standard Time (UTC+09:00)

Date	Time	Event
Sunday, 25 May 1958	09:30	1st round
Monday, 26 May 1958	11:30	2nd round
Tuesday, 27 May 1958	11:30	Semifinals
Thursday, 29 May 1958	10:00	Final

== Results ==
1st round
Liu Shang-ku (ROC)	6	6
Tuty Pandji (INA)	3	1
Katherine Leong (MAL)	3	0
Patricia Yngayo (PHI)	6	6
Desideria Ampon (PHI)	6	6
Chan Shiuo-miang (ROC)	2	2
Tsui Yuen Yuen (HKG)	6	4	6
Vonny Djoa (INA)	3	6	2

2nd round
Sachiko Kamo (JPN)	6	6
Ip Wai Pun (HKG)	3	1
Liu Shang-ku (ROC)	6	2	6
Patricia Yngayo (PHI)	1	6	1
Desideria Ampon (PHI)	6	6
Tsui Yuen Yuen (HKG)	1	2
Gladys Loke (MAL)	1	1
Reiko Miyagi (JPN)	6	6

Semifinals
Sachiko Kamo (JPN)	6	6
Liu Shang-ku (ROC)	1	3
Desideria Ampon (PHI)	2	10	6
Reiko Miyagi (JPN)	6	8	3

Final
Sachiko Kamo (JPN)	6	6
Desideria Ampon (PHI)	1	2
