= Tennis at the 1958 Asian Games – Women's doubles =

Women's doubles at the 1958 Asian Games
- Venue: New National Tennis Courts
- Dates: 26–30 May 1958
- Competitors: 12 from 6 nations

Medalists
gold medal	Sachiko Kamo; Reiko Miyagi	Japan
silver medal	Desideria Ampon; Patricia Yngayo	Philippines
bronze medal	Gladys Loke; Katherine Leong	Malaya
bronze medal	Liu Shang-ku; Chan Shiuo-miang	Republic of China

Women's doubles
- Tennis at the 1958 Asian Games

Events
Singles	men	women
Doubles	men	women	mixed
- Asian Games

The women's doubles tennis event was part of the tennis programme and took place between 26 and 30 May 1958, at the New National Tennis Courts.

== Schedule ==
All times are Japan Standard Time (UTC+09:00)

Date	Time	Event
Monday, 26 May 1958	11:30	1st round
Wednesday, 28 May 1958	10:30	Semifinals
Friday, 30 May 1958	10:00	Final

== Results ==
1st round			Semifinals				Final
			Sachiko Kamo (JPN); Reiko Miyagi (JPN)	6	6
Gladys Loke (MAL); Katherine Leong (MAL)	6	7	Gladys Loke (MAL); Katherine Leong (MAL)	2	1
Tuty Pandji (INA); Vonny Djoa (INA)	4	5					Sachiko Kamo (JPN); Reiko Miyagi (JPN)	6	6
Liu Shang-ku (ROC); Chan Shiuo-miang (ROC)	6	6					Desideria Ampon (PHI); Patricia Yngayo (PHI)	2	2
Tsui Yuen Yuen (HKG); Ip Wai Pun (HKG)	3	1	Liu Shang-ku (ROC); Chan Shiuo-miang (ROC)	2	6	1
			Desideria Ampon (PHI); Patricia Yngayo (PHI)	6	2	6
