= Tennis at the 1962 Asian Games =

- Venue: Senayan Tennis Stadium
- Dates: 25 August – 3 September 1962

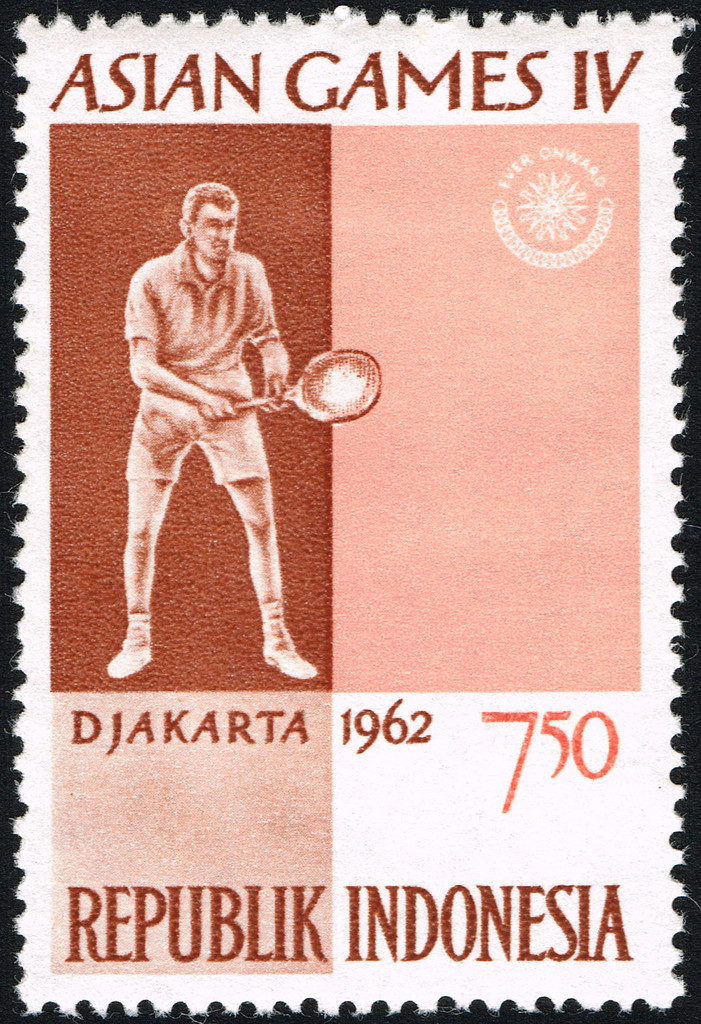
Tennis at the 1962 Asian Games on a stamp of Indonesia

Tennis was contested at the 1962 Asian Games inside the Asian Games Complex in Jakarta, Indonesia. Tennis had doubles and singles events for men and women, as well as a mixed doubles competition. The venues used were the Senayan Tennis Stadium, now known as the Center Court, and the now-demolished open courts located south of the stadium. The courts are now replaced by a baseball stadium.

Japan and the Philippines dominated the events winning all seven gold medals.

== Medalists ==
| Event | Gold | Silver | Bronze |
|---|---|---|---|
| Men's singles | Johnny Jose; Philippines | Atsushi Miyagi; Japan | Osamu Ishiguro; Japan |
| Men's singles | Johnny Jose; Philippines | Atsushi Miyagi; Japan | Michio Fujii; Japan |
| Men's doubles | Japan; Atsushi Miyagi; Michio Fujii | Philippines; Johnny Jose; Raymundo Deyro | Ceylon; Bernard Pinto; Raja Praesody |
| Men's doubles | Japan; Atsushi Miyagi; Michio Fujii | Philippines; Johnny Jose; Raymundo Deyro | Philippines; Miguel Dungo; Willie Hernandez |
| Men's team | Japan; Michio Fujii; Osamu Ishiguro; Atsushi Miyagi; Koji Watanabe | Philippines; Raymundo Deyro; Miguel Dungo; Willie Hernandez; Johnny Jose | Indonesia; Sofyan Mudjirat; N. Sanusi; Sutarjo Sugiarto; K. Tjokrosaputro |
| Women's singles | Akiko Fukui; Japan | Reiko Miyagi; Japan | Patricia Yngayo; Philippines |
| Women's singles | Akiko Fukui; Japan | Reiko Miyagi; Japan | Desideria Ampon; Philippines |
| Women's doubles | Japan; Reiko Miyagi; Akiko Fukui | Ranjani Jayasuriya; Ceylon; Tsui Yuen Yuen; Hong Kong | Indonesia; Jooce Suwarimbo; Mien Suhadi |
| Women's doubles | Japan; Reiko Miyagi; Akiko Fukui | Ranjani Jayasuriya; Ceylon; Tsui Yuen Yuen; Hong Kong | Philippines; Desideria Ampon; Patricia Yngayo |
| Women's team | Japan; Akiko Fukui; Reiko Miyagi | Indonesia; Vonny Djoa; Mien Suhadi; Jooce Suwarimbo | Philippines; Desideria Ampon; Patricia Yngayo |
| Mixed doubles | Japan; Koji Watanabe; Akiko Fukui | Japan; Michio Fujii; Reiko Miyagi | Philippines; Miguel Dungo; Desideria Ampon |
| Mixed doubles | Japan; Koji Watanabe; Akiko Fukui | Japan; Michio Fujii; Reiko Miyagi | Indonesia; Sofyan Mudjirat; Jooce Suwarimbo |

== Medal table ==
| Rank | Nation | Gold | Silver | Bronze | Total |
|---|---|---|---|---|---|
| 1 | Japan (JPN) | 6 | 3 | 2 | 11 |
| 2 | Philippines (PHI) | 1 | 2 | 6 | 9 |
| 3 | Indonesia (INA) | 0 | 1 | 3 | 4 |
| 4 | Ceylon (CEY) | 0 | 1 | 1 | 2 |
| 5 | Hong Kong (HKG) | 0 | 1 | 0 | 1 |
| Totals (5 entries) | | 7 | 8 | 12 | 27 |
