= Tennis at the 1958 Asian Games =

- Venue: New National Tennis Courts
- Dates: 25–30 May 1958
- Competitors: 61 from 15 nations

Tennis was contested at the 1958 Asian Games in New National Tennis Courts, Tokyo, Japan from May 25 to May 30, 1958. Tennis had doubles and singles events for men and women, as well as a mixed doubles competition.

A total of 60 tennis players from 15 nations competed in tennis at the 1958 Asian Games, Japan and the Philippines dominated the events winning all five gold and silver medals.

== Schedule ==
P	Preliminary rounds	¼	Quarterfinals	½	Semifinals	F	Final

Event↓/Date →	25th Sun	26th Mon	27th Tue	28th Wed	29th Thu	30th Fri
Men's singles	P	P	¼	½		F
Men's doubles		P	¼	½	F	
Women's singles	P	¼	½		F	
Women's doubles		¼		½		F
Mixed doubles			P	¼	½	F

== Medalists ==
Event	Gold	Silver	Bronze
Men's singles	Raymundo Deyro; Philippines	Felicisimo Ampon; Philippines	Johnny Jose; Philippines
Men's singles	Raymundo Deyro; Philippines	Felicisimo Ampon; Philippines	Miguel Dungo; Philippines
Men's doubles	Philippines; Felicisimo Ampon; Raymundo Deyro	Philippines; Johnny Jose; Miguel Dungo	Ceylon; Rupert Ferdinands; Bernard Pinto
Men's doubles	Philippines; Felicisimo Ampon; Raymundo Deyro	Philippines; Johnny Jose; Miguel Dungo	South Vietnam; Võ Văn Bảy; Võ Văn Thành
Women's singles	Sachiko Kamo; Japan	Desideria Ampon; Philippines	Liu Shang-ku; Republic of China
Women's singles	Sachiko Kamo; Japan	Desideria Ampon; Philippines	Reiko Miyagi; Japan
Women's doubles	Japan; Sachiko Kamo; Reiko Miyagi	Philippines; Desideria Ampon; Patricia Yngayo	Malaya; Gladys Loke; Katherine Leong
Women's doubles	Japan; Sachiko Kamo; Reiko Miyagi	Philippines; Desideria Ampon; Patricia Yngayo	Republic of China; Liu Shang-ku; Chan Shiuo-miang
Mixed doubles	Japan; Yoshihisa Shibata; Reiko Miyagi	Philippines; Miguel Dungo; Patricia Yngayo	Republic of China; Kao Teng-ko; Chan Shiuo-miang
Mixed doubles	Japan; Yoshihisa Shibata; Reiko Miyagi	Philippines; Miguel Dungo; Patricia Yngayo	Philippines; Felicisimo Ampon; Desideria Ampon

== Medal table ==
Rank	Nation	Gold	Silver	Bronze	Total
1	Japan (JPN)	3	0	1	4
2	Philippines (PHI)	2	5	3	10
3	Republic of China (ROC)	0	0	3	3
4	Ceylon (CEY)	0	0	1	1
4	Malaya (MAL)	0	0	1	1
4	South Vietnam (VNM)	0	0	1	1
Totals (6 entries)		5	5	10	20

== Participating nations ==
A total of 61 athletes from 15 nations competed in tennis at the 1958 Asian Games:

- Burma (1)
- Ceylon (3)
- Hong Kong (6)
- Indonesia (5)
- Iran (4)
- Japan (6)
- Malaya (4)
- Nepal (2)
- Pakistan (2)
- Philippines (6)
- Republic of China (6)
- Singapore (4)
- South Korea (4)
- South Vietnam (4)
- Thailand (4)
