= Badminton at the 1958 Asian Games =

- Venue: Toyama High School Gymnasium
- Dates: 29 – 31 May
- Nations: 3

Badminton was one of the two demonstration sports at the 1958 Asian Games in Tokyo. The events were held for three days, from 29 to 31 May 1958. There was only one event held and that was the men's team event.

Originally four countries took part in the event. These four countries were the Republic of China, Thailand, the Philippines and hosts Japan. The Philippines later withdrew their team from the event. The host nation, Japan won first place in the men's team event. Thailand finished as runners-up while the Republic of China finished in third place.

Thailand sent their backup players to participate in the event due to the main squad's preparation for the 1958 Thomas Cup.

== Medalists ==
Event	Gold	Silver	Bronze
Men's team	Japan; Kanetoshi Kataishi; Yasuhiro Komatsu; Kei Koshikawa; Kiyoshi Matsuo; Eiichi Nagai; Yoshiro Sato	Thailand; Sanguan Anandhanonda; Narong Bhornchima; Raphi Kanchanaraphi; Channarong Ratanaseangsuang; Soo Saekoh; Chuchart Vatanatham	Republic of China; Chang Shih-yen; Hou Liang-chin; Kao Hui-pang; Liang Ching-yu; Shih Chin-piao; Tung Sheng-ho

== Medal table ==
Rank	Nation	Gold	Silver	Bronze	Total
1	Japan (JPN)	1	0	0	1
2	Thailand (THA)	0	1	0	1
3	Republic of China (ROC)	0	0	1	1
Totals (3 entries)		1	1	1	3

== Results ==
Pos	Team	Pld	W	L	MF	MA	MD	Pts	Qualification
1	Japan	2	2	0	9	1	+8	2	Champions
2	Thailand	2	1	1	6	4	+2	1	Runners-up
3	Republic оf China	2	0	2	0	10	−10	0	Third place
4	Philippines	0	0	0	0	0	0	0	Withdrew

== Participating nations ==
- Japan
- Philippines (withdrew)
- Republic of China
- Thailand
