= Tennis at the 1966 Asian Games =

- Venue: National Tennis Stadium
- Dates: 10–20 December 1966

Tennis was contested at the 1966 Asian Games in Bangkok, Thailand from December 10 to December 20, 1966. Tennis had doubles and singles events for men and women, as well as a mixed doubles competition.

Japan and Indonesia dominated the events winning all seven gold medals.

== Medalists ==
Event	Gold	Silver	Bronze
Men's singles	Osamu Ishiguro; Japan	Ichizo Konishi; Japan	Jesus Hernandez; Philippines
Men's singles	Osamu Ishiguro; Japan	Ichizo Konishi; Japan	Taghi Akbari; Iran
Men's doubles	Japan; Osamu Ishiguro; Koji Watanabe	South Vietnam; Võ Văn Bảy; Lưu Hoàng Đức	India; Shiv Prakash Misra; Vinay Dhawan
Men's doubles	Japan; Osamu Ishiguro; Koji Watanabe	South Vietnam; Võ Văn Bảy; Lưu Hoàng Đức	Thailand; Sutiraphan Karalak; Netra Gramatica
Men's team	Japan; Osamu Ishiguro; Ichizo Konishi; Koji Watanabe; Keishiro Yanagi	Thailand; Somparn Champisri; Seri Charuchinda; Netra Gramatica; Sutiraphan Karalak	Iran; Taghi Akbari; Issa Khodaei; Ezzatollah Nemati; Nematollah Nemati
Men's team	Japan; Osamu Ishiguro; Ichizo Konishi; Koji Watanabe; Keishiro Yanagi	Thailand; Somparn Champisri; Seri Charuchinda; Netra Gramatica; Sutiraphan Karalak	Philippines; Delfin Contreras; Federico Deyro; Jesus Hernandez; Augusto Villanueva
Women's singles	Lany Kaligis; Indonesia	Kazuko Kuromatsu; Japan	Lita Liem; Indonesia
Women's singles	Lany Kaligis; Indonesia	Kazuko Kuromatsu; Japan	Phanow Sudsawasdi; Thailand
Women's doubles	Indonesia; Lita Liem; Lany Kaligis	Philippines; Desideria Ampon; Patricia Yngayo	Ceylon; Ranjani Jayasuriya; Wendy Molligoda
Women's doubles	Indonesia; Lita Liem; Lany Kaligis	Philippines; Desideria Ampon; Patricia Yngayo	South Korea; Yang Jeong-soon; Park Jong-bok
Women's team	Indonesia; Lany Kaligis; Lita Liem; Mien Suhadi	Japan; Kazuko Kuromatsu; Reiko Miyagi; Yoko Obata	Philippines; Desideria Ampon; Patricia Yngayo
Women's team	Indonesia; Lany Kaligis; Lita Liem; Mien Suhadi	Japan; Kazuko Kuromatsu; Reiko Miyagi; Yoko Obata	Ceylon; Sria Gooneratne; Ranjani Jayasuriya; Wendy Molligoda
Mixed doubles	Japan; Koji Watanabe; Reiko Miyagi	Philippines; Federico Deyro; Patricia Yngayo	Indonesia; Sutarjo Sugiarto; Lita Liem
Mixed doubles	Japan; Koji Watanabe; Reiko Miyagi	Philippines; Federico Deyro; Patricia Yngayo	Indonesia; Go Soen Houw; Lany Kaligis

== Medal table ==
Rank	Nation	Gold	Silver	Bronze	Total
1	Japan (JPN)	4	3	0	7
2	Indonesia (INA)	3	0	3	6
3	Philippines (PHI)	0	2	3	5
4	Thailand (THA)	0	1	2	3
5	South Vietnam (VNM)	0	1	0	1
6	Ceylon (CEY)	0	0	2	2
6	Iran (IRN)	0	0	2	2
8	India (IND)	0	0	1	1
8	South Korea (KOR)	0	0	1	1
Totals (9 entries)		7	7	14	28
