= Shiv Prakash Misra =

Indian tennis player

- Country (sports): IND
- Born: 24 February 1942 (age 84) Secundrabad, Andhra Pradesh, India
- Turned pro: 1961 (amateur)
- Retired: 1970

Singles
- Career record: 0–0
- Career titles: 3

Grand Slam singles results
- French Open: 1R (1965, 1966)
- Wimbledon: 2R (1964)
- US Open: 3R (1964)

Shiv Prakash Misra is a retired Indian tennis player and former Davis Cup captain. He was active on the ILTF World Circuit from 1961 to 1970 and won three singles titles. In addition he won a bronze medal in doubles at the 1966 Asian Games held in Bangkok.

== Career singles (4) ==
Included:

=== ILTF titles (3) ===
Year	Tournament	Location	Surface	Opponent	Score
1964	Newport Casino Consolation	Newport	Grass	(United States) Billy Lenoir	default
1966	Northumberland Championships	Newcastle	Grass	(New Zealand) Brian Fairlie	6–3, 6–4
1968	Western India Championships	Bombay	Clay	(India) Premjit Lall	1–6, 8–6, 9–7, 4–6, 6–3

=== ILTF finals (2) ===
Year	Tournament	Location	Surface	Opponent	Score
1968	Visakhapatnam Hard Court Championships	Visakhapatnam	Clay	(United States) Bill Tym	3–6, 6–1, 3–6
1969	Ceylon Championships	Nuwara Eliya	Clay	(Sri Lanka) Rupert Ferdinands	6–4, 6–2, 4–6, 6–8, 1–6
