= Tan Kim Bee =

Malaysian weightlifter

Personal information
- Nationality: Malaysian
- Born: 4 June 1929
- Died: 2 November 2015 (aged 86)

Sport
- Sport: Weightlifting
Medal record
Representing Malaya
Men's weightlifting
Asian Games
Bronze medal – third place	1958 Tokyo	90 kg
British Empire and Commonwealth Games
Silver medal – second place	1958 Cardiff	90 kg
Bronze medal – third place	1950 Auckland	82.5 kg

Tan Kim Bee (4 June 1929 – 2 November 2015) was a Malaysian weightlifter. Tan first competed in the 1950 British Empire Games and won a bronze medal in the men's light heavyweight event. Six years later, he competed in the 1956 Summer Olympics and was named the flag bearer for the opening ceremony for Malaya's debut appearance.

Among his medals include a bronze medal at the 1958 Asian Games and a silver medal at the 1958 British Empire and Commonwealth Games. Outside of sport, he worked as a mining engineer and later the Director General for the Mines Department of Malaysia.

== Biography ==
Tan Kim Bee was born on 4 June 1929, being of Peranakan Chinese descent. By 1950, he hailed from Selangor.

Tan's first international weightlifting competition was for Malaya at the 1950 British Empire Games held in Auckland, New Zealand. He competed in the men's light heavyweight event, placed third overall with a total of 765 pounds (347 kg), and earned Malaya the overall championship for the weightlifting competitions at the Games. After the Games, he remained in New Zealand under a federal scholarship for the University of Otago before graduating in 1956 as a mining engineer. He then worked for the Mines Department of Malaysia. In the same year, he competed for Malaya at the 1956 Summer Olympics held in Melbourne, Australia, and was named the flag bearer for the opening ceremony. This appearance was the debut of the team. He competed in the men's middle-heavyweight event for lifters that weighed 90 kilograms (200 lb) or less. There, he pressed 117.5 kilograms, snatched 122.5 kilograms, and clean and jerked 155 kilograms for a total of 395 kilograms. He placed sixth overall.

Two years later, Tan competed in the 1958 Asian Games held in Tokyo, Japan, for Malaya's first appearance at an edition of the Games. There, he won the bronze medal in the men's middle heavyweight event. He also competed in the 1958 British Empire and Commonwealth Games held in Cardiff, Wales, and earned the silver medal in the men's middle heavyweight event.

Tan qualified for the 1960 Summer Olympics in Rome, Italy, but decided to pull-out from competition as his wife was expecting their child. He retired from sport shortly after that and continued his work for the Mines Department of Malaysia before retiring in 1984 as its Director General. He died on 2 November 2015 at the age of 86.
