= Hwang Ho-dong =

South Korean weightlifter (1936–2010)

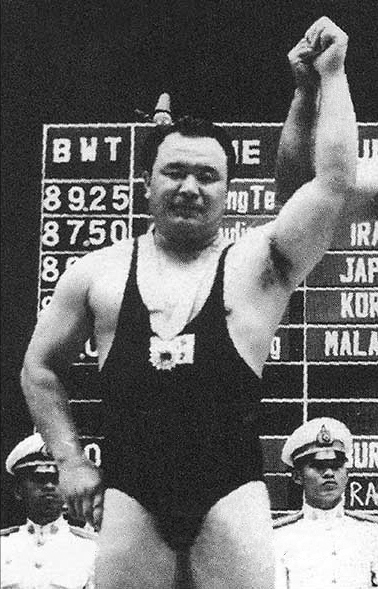
- Hwang Ho-dong at the 1966 Asian Games

Personal information
- Born: 25 December 1936 South Jeolla Province, South Korea
- Died: 18 March 2010 (aged 73)
- Height: 180 cm (5 ft 11 in)

Korean name
- Hangul: 황호동
- RR: Hwang Hodong
- MR: Hwang Hodong

Sport
- Sport: Weightlifting
Medal record
Representing South Korea
Asian Games
Silver medal – second place	1958 Tokyo	-90 kg
Silver medal – second place	1966 Bangkok	+90 kg
Silver medal – second place	1974 Tehran	+110 kg

Hwang Ho-dong (Korean: 황호동; 25 December 1936 – 18 March 2010) was a South Korean heavyweight weightlifter and politician who won silver medals at the 1958, 1966 and 1974 Asian Games. He competed at the 1960, 1964 and 1968 Olympics with the best result of eighth place in 1964.

While weightlifting at the 1974 Asian Games, he was serving as a member of the National Assembly.
