= Willie Hernandez (tennis) =

Filipino tennis player

Willie Hernandez Jr.
- Full name: Guillermo Hernandez
- Country (sports): Philippines
- Height: 5 ft 6 in (168 cm)

Grand Slam singles results
- Australian Open: 2R (1959)
- Wimbledon: 2R (1962)
- US Open: 2R (1961)
Medal record
Asian Games
Silver medal – second place	1962 Jakarta	Men's team
Bronze medal – third place	1962 Jakarta	Men's doubles

Guillermo Hernandez, better known as Willie Hernandez, is a Filipino former amateur tennis player.

Hernandez, the son of a famous sportscaster, grew up in Manila and started playing tennis at the age of 10. His first international title was a junior tournament in Osaka. After briefly attending Hopkins High School in Minnesota as an exchange student, Hernandez played collegiate tennis for the University of Arizona.

He won two medals with the Philippines at the 1962 Asian Games.

Hernandez won the 1963 Arizona Open on clay against a field of U.S. clay players.

During the 1990s he relocated to the United States.
