= Ong Chew Bee =

Malayan tennis player from Singapore

- Country (sports): Malaya
- Born: 25 May 1924; Singapore, Straits Settlements
- Died: 18 March 2018 (aged 93); Singapore
- Turned pro: 1949 (amateur tour)
- Retired: 1961
- Plays: Right-handed

Singles
- Career titles: 13

Grand Slam singles results
- French Open: 1R (1951)
- Wimbledon: 1R (1951)

Doubles
- Career titles: 1

Ong Chew Bee (25 May 1924 – 18 March 2018) was a Malayan tennis player from Singapore. He was the first Singaporean player to compete at both Wimbledon and the French championships in 1951. He was active from 1949 to 1961 and won 13 career singles titles. In addition he won the bronze medal in singles at the 1959 Southeast Asian Peninsular Games held in Bangkok, Thailand.

== Tennis career ==
Ong played his first tournament at the Malayan Championships in 1949. In 1950 he won the Malayan Championships and Singapore Championships. Ong would go onto win both Singapore Championships seven more times from 1952 to 1958 and the Malayan Championships two more times from 1954 to 1955.

In 1950 and 1951 he embarked on a tour of the ILTF European Circuit playing in England and France. In 1951 he won the East Gloucestershire Championships at Cheltenham against Richard Guise. Ong also played at the London Championships, Cannes Championships and the Beaulieu International in the early 1950s, but he exited in the early rounds of all events. In 1951 at major tournaments he became the first tennis player from Singapore to play at both the French Championships and Wimbledon Championships where he was defeated in the first rounds by France's Gil de Kermadec and Britain's Gerry Oakley, respectively.

He reached the final of the Hoylake and West Kirby Open where he was beaten by the South African player David Samaai. In 1953 he reached the final of the Malaysian International Championships held in Singapore where he lost to the Australian Neale Fraser in straight sets. In 1955 he won the Malaysian International Championships at Ipoh against Hong Kong player Koon Hung Ip. In 1957 he won the singles, doubles and mixed doubles titles at the Singapore Open Championships.

He also captained Malaya's first Davis Cup team in 1957 before retiring in 1961. Ong also won the bronze medal in singles at the 1959 Southeast Asian Peninsular Games held in Bangkok. He briefly also became a tennis coach.

== Other sports ==
Ong went onto become a notable national amateur golfer playing left handed where he won the 1967 Putra Cup team title.
