= Jooce Suwarimbo =

Indonesian tennis player

- Country (sports): Indonesia
- Born: 22 May 1942 (age 83)

Jooce Suwarimbo
Medal record

Women's Tennis

Representing Indonesia

Asian Games
Bronze medal – third place	1962 Jakarta	Women's Doubles
Bronze medal – third place	1962 Jakarta	Mixed Doubles

Jooce Suwarimbo (born 22 May 1942) is a former Indonesian tennis player. She is also sometimes referred to as Yoce or Jo Suwarimbo, or Tri Soewarimbo Yolanda.

In 1961, she reached the finals in the doubles competition of the Indonesian Championships, partnered by Vonny Djoa. They lost to the Japanese pair of Akiko Fukui and Reoko Miyagi in three sets.

In April 1962, she and partner Mien Suhadi won the doubles competition of the Jakarta Raya Championships, beating Vonny Djoa and Liem in the final in two sets. Suwarimbo lost the singles final to Suhadi in three sets. Later in that year they reached the final of another Jakarta tournament, losing the final to the Australian pair of Fay Toyne and Val Wicks in straight sets.

At the 1962 Asian Games in Jakarta, Suwarimbo won two medals: the bronze medal in the Women's Doubles with partner Suhadi, and the bronze medal in the Mixed Doubles with partner Sofiyan Mudjirat.
