= Meng Qianghua =

Chinese tennis player

- Full name: Meng Qianghua
- Country (sports): China
- Born: 13 May 1966 (age 59)
- Height: 178 cm (5 ft 10 in)

Singles
- Highest ranking: No. 600 (10 September 1990)

Doubles
- Highest ranking: No. 494 (19 August 1991)

Meng Qianghua (born 13 May 1966) is a former professional tennis player from China.

== Biography ==
Meng, who won a doubles gold medal with Xia Jiaping at the 1990 Asian Games, partnered with the same player at the 1992 Summer Olympics in Barcelona. They were beaten in the first round of the Olympic men's doubles by second seeded Swiss players Jakob Hlasek and Marc Rosset.

During his career he played the doubles rubber in three Davis Cup ties for China.
