= Tau Luu =

Tennis sliver medalist

- Country (sports): South Vietnam (British Hong Kong) Hong Kong
- Born: 1944 French Indochina
- Died: 1999 (aged 54–55)
- Plays: Right-handed

Singles
- Career record: 8–11 (Davis Cup & Grand Prix)

Grand Slam singles results
- Australian Open: 1R (1964)

Doubles
- Career record: 4–6 (Davis Cup & Grand Prix)

Grand Slam doubles results
- Australian Open: 2R (1964)
Medal record
Representing South Vietnam
Asian Games
Silver medal – second place	1966 Bangkok	Men's doubles

Tau Luu (1944—1999), formerly Lưu Hoàng Đức, was a Vietnamese-born tennis player who immigrated to Hong Kong. He was a doubles silver medalist for South Vietnam at the 1966 Asian Games.

== Biography ==
During the 1960s, Luu competed for the South Vietnam Davis Cup team and featured in the country's first ever tie in 1964. In his first two years he helped South Vietnam to a runner-ups finish in Eastern Zone B, then in 1969 he was a member of the team which defeated South Korea in Seoul to reach the Zone A final. The South Vietnamese however withdrew from the final against Japan and Luu didn't appear in the Davis Cup again, having fled to Hong Kong while returning from Seoul.

Luu spent his initial months in Hong Kong in hiding before emerging with his new pseudonym. When he began competing on the local tennis scene, suspicion was raised that he was the former South Vietnamese player, but nothing could be proved. Hong Kong granted him a visa in 1970 after he revealed his identity. In 1972 his passport expired and he faced deportation, only to be saved by tennis officials who pleaded his case.

While competing in Hong Kong in the 1970s he won a record eight successive CRC Open titles. In addition he also twice won the Hong Kong National Grass Court Tennis Championships and was a three-time winner of the SCAA Open. He never played in the Davis Cup for Hong Kong but did serve as a Davis Cup coach.

Luu died of cancer in 1999.
