= Ceylon at the 1958 Asian Games =

- IOC code: CEY
- NOC: Ceylon Olympic Committee

in Tokyo
- Medals Ranked 11th: Gold 1 Silver 0 Bronze 1 Total 2

Asian Games appearances
- 1951; 1954; 1958; 1962; 1966; 1970; 1974; 1978; 1982; 1986; 1990; 1994; 1998; 2002; 2006; 2010; 2014; 2018; 2022; 2026

Ceylon participated in the 1958 Asian Games held in Tokyo, Japan from May 24 to June 1, 1958. The country ranked 11th with a gold and bronze medal.

== Medalists ==
Medal	Name	Sport	Event
Gold	Nagalingam Ethirveerasingam	Athletics	Men's High jump
Bronze	Rupert Ferdinands; Bernard Pinto	Tennis	Men's doubles

== Medal summary ==
=== Medal table ===
Sport	Gold	Silver	Bronze	Total
Athletics	1	0	0	1
Tennis	0	0	1	1
Totals (2 entries)	1	0	1	2
