= Munir Pirzada =

Pakistani tennis player (1937–2019)

- Native name: منیر پیرزادہ
- ITF name: Munir Pirzada
- Born: 3 January 1937 British India
- Died: 2 November 2019 (aged 82) Karachi, Pakistan

Munir A. Pirzada (3 January 1937 – 2 November 2019) was a Pakistani professional tennis player and the former Secretary of Pakistan Tennis Federation. He played forty-seven first-class matches, including 1956 Wimbledon Championships and Davis Cup tournaments.

Pirzada won 28 first class matches out of 47 throughout his career, leading him to retain his position in national championship from 1956 to 1960. In 1956, he also played in Australian Open and Roland Garros tournaments.
