= Mien Suhadi =

Indonesian tennis player

- Country (sports): Indonesia
- Last updated on: 17 May 2009.

Mien Suhadi
Medal record

Women's Tennis

Representing Indonesia

Asian Games
Bronze medal – third place	1962 Jakarta	Women's Doubles

Mien Suhadi is a former Indonesian tennis player.

== Professional overview ==
In 1960, Suhadi won the Bandung Open, defeating Tan Liep Tjiaw in the final, 0–6, 0–6, 6–4.

She won the Jakarta Raya Championships in April 1962, beating Jooce Suwarimbo, 4–6, 7–5, 7–5. She and partner Suwarimbo won the doubles competition beating Vonny Djoa and Liem in the final, 6–1, 6–4. Later in that year, Suhadi and Suwarimbo reached the final of another Jakarta tournament, losing the final to the Australian pair of Fay Toyne and Val Wicks, 6–0, 8–6.

At the 1962 Asian Games in Jakarta, Suhadi won the bronze medal in the Women's Doubles with partner Jooce Suwarimbo.

In 1965, she and Lita Liem won the doubles competition of the Indonesian Gravel Invitational in Jakarta. She also reached the final of the singles competition, where she was defeated by Lita Liem.

At the 1967 Malaysian Open, Suhadi and partner Itjas Sumarna reached the final of the doubles competition, but were beaten in straight sets by Lany Kaligis and Lita Liem.
