= Miguel Dungo Jr. =

Filipino tennis player

Miguel Dungo
- Full name: Miguel Dungo Jr.
- Country (sports): Philippines

Singles
- Career record: 1–2 (Davis Cup)

Doubles
- Career record: 1–2 (Davis Cup)
Medal record
Asian Games
| Silver medal – second place | 1958 Tokyo | Men's doubles |
| Silver medal – second place | 1958 Tokyo | Mixed doubles |
| Silver medal – second place | 1962 Jakarta | Men's team |
| Bronze medal – third place | 1958 Tokyo | Men's singles |
| Bronze medal – third place | 1962 Jakarta | Men's doubles |
| Bronze medal – third place | 1962 Jakarta | Mixed doubles |

Miguel Dungo Jr., also known as Mike Dungo, is a Filipino former tennis player.

Dungo played Davis Cup ties for the Philippines in 1958 and 1968, with his brother Eduardo an early teammate.

A-six time Asian Games medalist, Dungo's haul included a singles bronze at the 1958 Asian Games in Tokyo, where he shared the podium with three other Filipinos. The remaining medals were in doubles and team events.

His son, Miguel Dungo III, played on the professional tour in the 1980s.
