= Sachiko Kamo =

Japanese tennis player (1926–2003)

- Country (sports): Japan
- Born: 11 February 1926; Tokyo, Japan
- Died: 28 October 2003 (aged 77)
- Plays: Right-handed

Singles

Grand Slam singles results
- Wimbledon: 3R (1954)
- US Open: 3R (1954)
Medal record
Asian Games
Gold medal – first place	1958 Tokyo	Women's singles
Gold medal – first place	1958 Tokyo	Women's doubles

Sachiko Kamo (11 February 1926 – 28 October 2003) was a Japanese tennis player of the 1950s.

Born and raised in Tokyo, Kamo was the second eldest of four tennis siblings, which included Davis Cup representative Kosei Kamo. She won the singles title at the All-Japan tennis championships six times in a row immediately after the war and eight times in total. In 1954 she made history as the first Japanese woman to compete at the Wimbledon Championships and made the singles third round. During the same trip she was the joint singles title winner of the Welsh Championships, with the final abandoned due to rain. She won a gold medal in singles and doubles at the 1958 Asian Games in Tokyo, which was the first time tennis was included on the program.
