= Felicisimo Ampon =

Filipino tennis player (1920–1997)

- Full name: Felicisimo Hermoso Ampon
- Country (sports): Philippines
- Residence: Philippines
- Born: October 27, 1920 Manila, Philippine Islands
- Died: October 7, 1997 (aged 76) Highland Park, Illinois, United States
- Height: 5 ft 3 in (1.60 m)
- Turned pro: 1945 (amateur)
- Retired: 1968
- College: Far Eastern University

Singles
- Career record: 246-111 (68.9%)
- Career titles: 28

Grand Slam singles results
- French Open: QF (1952, 1953)
- Wimbledon: 3R (1949, 1950, 1953)
- US Open: 4R (1948, 1949, 1950, 1952)

Grand Slam doubles results
- Wimbledon: 3R (1948, 1952, 1953)

Grand Slam mixed doubles results
- Wimbledon: 4R (1949)

Felicisimo Ampon (October 27, 1920 – October 7, 1997) was a tennis player from the Philippines. In major events he was a two time singles quarter finalist at the French Championships 1952 to 1953. He is considered to be the greatest Filipino tennis player in history, and at only 5 foot 3 inches tall, was once considered the best tennis player in the world, pound for pound.

He represented the country in several Davis Cup competitions for almost 30 years, and holds the Philippine all-time record for the most singles (34-26) and total wins (40-35) in Davis Cup history. He was known for winning the 1934 Far Eastern Games tennis gold medal, the 1950 Pan American Games tennis singles gold medal, the 1958 Asian Games tennis doubles gold medal, and 1968 Chinese Recreational Club Open Tennis doubles title.

== Career ==
Felicisimo Ampon was the son of former tennis player Felix Ampon and the brother of Desideria Ampon, who at her time dominated women's tennis in Asia.

Ampon made a good start of his career in the Far Eastern Games, winning the tennis singles gold medal in the 1934 edition. He twice played in the Philippines Amateur Tennis Championships and was beaten in the play-offs on both occasion. In 1936, he lost to eventual finalist Juanito Gavia in the quarterfinals. In 1937, he defeated Sam Ang and Alfredo Diy, and made it to the finals of the Philippines Championship but lost to Leonardo Gavia Jr. After a disappointing Philippines Championships campaign, Ampon bounced back.

After the war, Ampon made history by winning the Wimbledon Plate Championship in 1948, a trophy for the 96 players who made an early exit in the first and second rounds of the Wimbledon Championships.

In 1948 he won an International tournament in Copenhagen, Denmark, in 1949 he won Welsh Championships singles title, defeating South African Syd Levy in the final, the Bristol Championships, again defeating Levy in the final, and in 1951 he became the singles champions at the Swedish Hard Court Championships on clay after defeating Deyro on the final. Ampon participated in the 1950 Pan American Tennis Championships in Mexico City and won the singles event, his finest career title. Defeating Davis Cup legend Bill Talbert (USA) in the semi-finals and two-time Grand Slam finalist Tom Brown (USA) in the finals. That victory, earned Ampon the first ever Philippines Sportswriters Association (PSA) Athlete of the Year award in 2000.

In 1952, Ampon made it to the quarter-finals of the French Open at Roland Garros but narrowly lost to world number one Frank Sedgman (AUS) he reached the final of the Scottish Championships losing to Ian Ayre. In 1953, he returned to Roland Garros and made impact, defeating the 1950 champion Budge Patty (USA) in the fourth round before losing to eventual champion Ken Rosewall (AUS) in the quarter-finals. Both quarter-finals was the highest finished by a Filipino in Grand Slam tennis. He also becomes the shortest player ever to play in Wimbledon history and won over 30 European trophies throughout his career. The same year Ampon lost an all-Filipino final in Oslo, Norway, to Reymundo Deyro, arguably his greatest rival and partner in Philippine tennis history.

In 1958 Asian Games, he was defeated again by Deyro in the finals of men's singles tennis and finished with a silver medal. He then partnered with Deyro to capture the men's doubles gold medal and with his sister Desideria Ampon captured the mixed doubles bronze medal.

In the Davis Cup he went on to lead the country in the Eastern Zone for more than a decade and made a prolific partnerships with other Filipino tennis legends Raymundo Deyro, Johnny Jose and Cesar Carmona.

Ampon represented his country for the last time in 1968. He ended his Davis Cup career holding the Philippine record for the most singles (34-26) and total wins (40-35) in history. He also won his last title, teaming up with Hong Kong's Kenneth Tsui to capture the Chinese Recreational Club (CRC) Open men's double title.

== Career singles finals (50) ==
=== Titles (28) ===
- 1934 - Far East Games (Gold)
- 1940 - Philippine Indoor Championships
- 1941 - International Championships of the Philippines
- 1946 - Pennsylvania Clay Court Championships
- 1947 - Philippine Closed Championships
- 1948 - Midland Counties Championships
- 1948 - Wimbledon Plate
- 1949 - Antwerp International
- 1949 - Philippine Indoor Championships (2)
- 1949 - Welsh Championships
- 1949 - West of England Championships
- 1950 - Indian International Championships
- 1950 - All India Championships
- 1950 - Northern India Championships
- 1950 - Pan American Championships (Gold)
- 1951 - Dortmund International
- 1951 - Eastern Mediterranean Championships
- 1951 - Koln International
- 1951 - Lugano Lido Tournament
- 1951 - Turkish International Championships
- 1952 - Philippines International Championships (2)
- 1953 - Brumana International
- 1953 - Philippines International Championships (3)
- 1955 - Philippines International Championships (4)
- 1959 - Philippines International Championships (5)
- 1959 - Philippines International Championships (6)
- 1963 - Philippines International Championships (7)
- 1966 - Philippines International Championships (8)

=== Runners-Up (22) ===
- 1949 - Asian Lawn Tennis Championships
- 1950 - Madrid Puerta de Hierro International
- 1950 - Philippines International Championships
- 1951 - Pau Championships
- 1951 - Coupe Marcel Poree
- 1951 - International Swedish Hard Court Championships
- 1951 - International Championships of Egypt
- 1951 - British Hard Court Championships
- 1951 - Dutch International Championships
- 1952 - Scottish Championships
- 1953 - Shirley Park Open
- 1953 - Oslo International
- 1953 - British Hard Court Championships
- 1954 - Asian Lawn Tennis Championships
- 1957 - Philippines International Championships
- 1958 - Asian Games (Silver Medal)
- 1960 - Malaysian International Championships
- 1961 - Malaysian International Championships
- 1964 -Philippines International Championships
- 1965 - Philippines Closed Championships
- 1966 - Philippines Closed Championships
- 1967 - Philippines International Championships

=== Doubles titles ===
- 1958 Asian Games men's doubles champions (gold) with Reymundo Deyro

=== Mixed doubles events ===
- 1951 Eastern Mediterranean Championships (Athens-Greece) finalist with Beryl Bartlett
- 1958 Asian Games mixed doubles, 3rd place (bronze) with Desideria Ampon

=== Team events ===
- 1957 Davis Cup Eastern Zone champion
- 1958 Davis Cup Eastern Zone champion
- 1960 Davis Cup Eastern Zone champion
- 1964 Davis Cup Eastern Zone champion
