= Malaya at the 1958 Asian Games =

- IOC code: MAS
- NOC: Olympic Council of Malaysia
- Website: www.olympic.org.my (in English)

in Tokyo
- Competitors: 80 in 9 sports
- Medals Ranked 15th: Gold 0 Silver 0 Bronze 3 Total 3

Asian Games appearances (overview)
- 1954; 1958; 1962; 1966; 1970; 1974; 1978; 1982; 1986; 1990; 1994; 1998; 2002; 2006; 2010; 2014; 2018; 2022; 2026

Other related appearances
- North Borneo (1954, 1958, 1962); Sarawak (1962)

The Federation of Malaya competed in the 1958 Asian Games held in Tokyo, Japan from 24 May 1958 to 1 June 1958. It ranked fifteenth in the overall medal table with no gold medals, no silver medals and three bronze medals.

== Medal summary ==
=== Medals by sport ===
Sport	Gold	Silver	Bronze	Total	Rank
Athletics	0	0	1	1	11
Tennis	0	0	1	1	4
Weightlifting	0	0	1	1	6
Total	0	0	3	3	15

=== Medallists ===
Medal	Name	Sport	Event
Bronze	Abdul Rahim Ahmed	Athletics	Men's 400 metres
Bronze	Gladys Loke; Katherine Leong	Tennis	Women's doubles
Bronze	Tan Kim Bee	Weightlifting	Men's middle heavyweight (90 kg)

== Athletics ==
Key

- Note–Ranks given for track events are within the athlete's heat only
- Q = Qualified for the next round
- q = Qualified for the next round as a fastest loser or, in field events, by position without achieving the qualifying target
- NR = National record
- N/A = Round not applicable for the event
- Bye = Athlete not required to compete in round

Men
Track event

Athlete	Event	Final	
Athlete	Event	Time	Rank
Abdul Rahim Ahmed	400 m	48.8	3rd place, bronze medalist(s)

== Basketball ==
=== Men's tournament ===
Group B

Team	Pld	W	L	PF	PA	PD	Pts
Philippines	2	2	0	207	100	+107	4
Thailand	2	1	1	143	168	−25	3
Malaya	2	0	2	131	213	−82	2

26 May

Malaya	71–103	Thailand

Metropolitan Gymnasium, Tokyo

27 May

Philippines	110–60	Malaya

Metropolitan Gymnasium, Tokyo

Seventh to tenth place classification

Team	Pld	W	L	PF	PA	PD	Pts	Rank
Cambodia	3	3	0	287	252	+35	6	7
Hong Kong	3	2	1	262	248	+14	5	8
Indonesia	3	1	2	263	266	−3	4	9
Malaya	3	0	3	248	294	−46	3	10

Qualified for the finals

28 May

Indonesia	98–84	Malaya

Metropolitan Gymnasium, Tokyo

29 May

Malaya	86–102	Cambodia

Metropolitan Gymnasium, Tokyo

30 May

Malaya	78–94	Hong Kong

Metropolitan Gymnasium, Tokyo

Ranked 10th in final standings

== Field hockey ==
=== Men's tournament ===
Final round

Team	Pld	W	D	L	GF	GA	GD	Pts	Rank
Pakistan	4	3	1	0	19	0	+19	7	1st place, gold medalist(s)
India	4	3	1	0	16	1	+15	7	2nd place, silver medalist(s)
South Korea	4	2	0	2	6	13	−7	4	3rd place, bronze medalist(s)
Malaya	4	0	1	3	2	15	−13	1	4
Japan	4	0	1	3	1	15	−14	1	5

25 May

Malaya	2–3	South Korea

National Stadium, Tokyo

27 May

India	6–0	Malaya

National Stadium, Tokyo

28 May

Pakistan	6–0	Malaya

National Stadium, Tokyo

30 May

Japan	0–0	Malaya

National Stadium, Tokyo

Ranked 4th in final standings

== Football ==
=== Men's tournament ===
Group A

Team	Pld	W	D	L	GF	GA	GAV	Pts
Taiwan	2	2	0	0	5	2	2.500	4
South Vietnam	2	1	1	0	7	2	3.500	3
Pakistan	2	0	1	1	2	4	0.500	1
Malaya	2	0	0	2	2	8	0.250	0

Qualified for the quarterfinals

25 May

Taiwan	2–1	Malaya

Tokyo

27 May

Malaya	1–6	South Vietnam

Tokyo

Ranked 13th in final standings

== Tennis ==
Four tennis player represented for Malaysia in tennis.

Athlete	Event	Final	Rank
Athlete	Event	Opposition Score	Rank
Gladys Loke; Katherine Leong	Women's doubles		3rd place, bronze medalist(s)

== Weightlifting ==
Men

Athlete	Event	Military press		Snatch		Clean & jerk		Total	Rank
Athlete	Event	Result	Rank	Result	Rank	Result	Rank	Total	Rank
Tan Kim Bee	Middle heavyweight (90 kg)								3rd place, bronze medalist(s)

== Wrestling ==
Two wrestler represented for Malaysia in wrestling.
