= Thailand at the 1958 Asian Games =

- IOC code: THA
- NOC: National Olympic Committee of Thailand
- Website: www.olympicthai.or.th/eng (in English and Thai)

in Tokyo
- Medals Ranked 12th: Gold 0 Silver 1 Bronze 3 Total 4

Asian Games appearances (overview)
- 1951; 1954; 1958; 1962; 1966; 1970; 1974; 1978; 1982; 1986; 1990; 1994; 1998; 2002; 2006; 2010; 2014; 2018; 2022; 2026

Thailand participated in the 1958 Asian Games in Tokyo on 24 May to 1 June 1958. Thailand ended the games at 4 overall medals with no gold medal.
