= Reiko Miyagi =

Japanese tennis player (1922–2008)

- Country (sports): Japan
- Born: 27 May 1922; Ōta, Tokyo
- Died: 1 June 2008 (aged 86); Setagaya, Tokyo

Singles

Grand Slam singles results
- Australian Open: 1R (1964)
- US Open: 2R (1964)
Medal record
Asian Games
Gold medal – first place	1958 Tokyo	Women's doubles
Gold medal – first place	1958 Tokyo	Mixed doubles
Gold medal – first place	1962 Jakarta	Women's doubles
Gold medal – first place	1962 Jakarta	Women's team
Gold medal – first place	1966 Bangkok	Mixed doubles
Silver medal – second place	1962 Jakarta	Women's singles
Silver medal – second place	1962 Jakarta	Mixed doubles
Silver medal – second place	1966 Bangkok	Women's team
Bronze medal – third place	1958 Tokyo	Women's singles

Reiko Miyagi (27 May 1922 – 1 June 2008) was a Japanese tennis player of the 1950s and 1960s. She was the elder sister of grand slam doubles champion Atsushi Miyagi.

Miyagi was born in Ōta City, near the grounds of the Denen Coliseum where she trained.

A four-time Asian Games gold medalist, Miyagi won a record thirty titles at the All Japan Championships across singles and doubles. Ten of those national titles were in singles, including eight that Miyagi won consecutively from 1956 to 1963.

In 1964 she was a member of Japan's first ever Federation Cup team and made the singles second round of that year's U.S. National Championships, losing to Billie Jean Moffitt.

Miyagi was the Japanese Federation Cup coach from 1978 to 1982.
