= Desideria Ampon =

Filipino tennis player (born 1924)

- Country (sports): Philippines
- Born: September 19, 1924
Medal record
Asian Games
Silver medal – second place	1958 Tokyo	Women's singles
Silver medal – second place	1958 Tokyo	Women's doubles
Silver medal – second place	1966 Bangkok	Women's doubles
Bronze medal – third place	1958 Tokyo	Mixed doubles
Bronze medal – third place	1962 Jakarta	Women's singles
Bronze medal – third place	1962 Jakarta	Women's doubles
Bronze medal – third place	1962 Jakarta	Women's team
Bronze medal – third place	1962 Jakarta	Mixed doubles
Bronze medal – third place	1966 Bangkok	Women's team

Desideria Ampon (born September 19, 1924) was a Filipino former tennis player. She was the daughter of former tennis player Felix Ampon and the sister of Felicisimo Ampon.

She won the women’s singles event at the Philippines Open International Championships a record eleven times – in 1955, 1956, 1958, 1959, 1960, 1965, 1966, 1967, 1968, 1969 and 1971. Desideria also enjoyed success in the women’s doubles and the mixed doubles events at the same tournament.

At the Asian Games, Ampon won nine medals over the course of three competitions. In 1958, in Tokyo, she won the silver medal in the women’s singles event, silver also in the women’s doubles event (w. Patricia Yngayo) and bronze in the mixed doubles event with her brother Felicisimo. In 1962, in Jakarta, Indonesia, Desideria won the bronze medal in the women’s singles event, women's team event and the bronze also in the women’s doubles event (w. Patricia Yngayo) and the bronze again in the mixed doubles event (w. Miguel Dungo). Lastly, in 1966, in the Thai capital Bangkok, Desideria won the silver medal in the women’s doubles event with Patricia Yngayo and the bronze medal in women's team event.
