= Johnny Jose =

Filipino tennis player (1938–2018)

- Full name: Juan Maria Johnson Jose
- Country (sports): Philippines
- Born: August 8, 1938
- Died: October 23, 2018 (aged 80)
- Retired: 1964

Singles
- Career record: 12–13 (Davis Cup)

Grand Slam singles results
- US Open: 1R (1955)

Doubles
- Career record: 8–9 (Davis Cup)
Medal record
Asian Games
Gold medal – first place	1962 Jakarta	Men's singles
Silver medal – second place	1958 Tokyo	Men's doubles
Silver medal – second place	1962 Jakarta	Men's doubles
Silver medal – second place	1962 Jakarta	Men's team
Bronze medal – third place	1958 Tokyo	Men's singles

Juan Maria Johnson Jose (August 8, 1938 — October 23, 2018) was a Filipino tennis player.

== Tennis career ==
Jose, as 17-year old, caught the eye of former world number one Frank Sedgman, who said he had the makings of a world-class player after seeing him compete in Manila. He made his Davis Cup debut for the Philippines in 1955.

In 1957 he had some noteworthy performances in a tour of Australia, including a win over Belgium's top player Philippe Washer at the South Australian championships. He also pushed Australian rising star Neale Fraser to 8–10 in the fifth set at the Victorian championships.

Jose took a set off Butch Buchholz in a 1960 Davis Cup tie against the United States.

At the 1962 Asian Games in Jakarta, Jose defeated Japan's Atsushi Miyagi in the singles final, to become the second (and most recent) Filipino to claim the singles gold medal.

In 1964 he won the decisive fifth rubber of the Davis Cup Eastern Inter-Zonal Final over Premjit Lall of India, setting up a tie against Sweden in Båstad which would be his final appearance.

Jose was inducted as a member of the Philippine Sports Hall of Fame in 2016.
