= Michio Fujii =

Japanese tennis player (born 1939)

- Country (sports): Japan
- Born: 16 December 1939 (age 85); Ashiya, Hyogo, Japan

Singles

Grand Slam singles results
- French Open: 1R (1965)
- Wimbledon: 1R (1962, 1963)
- US Open: 1R (1963, 1965)

Michio Fujii (Japanese: 藤井 道雄, Hepburn: Fujii Michio; born 16 December 1939) is a Japanese former tennis player. He competed in the Grand Slam singles events five times, losing in the first round each time. He also represented Japan in the Davis Cup in 1962 and 1963, after winning the national championship in 1961 and 1962.
