= Võ Văn Bảy =

Vietnamese tennis player (1931–1998)

- Country (sports): South Vietnam
- Born: 18 July 1931 Vĩnh Long, French Indochina
- Died: 24 November 1998 (aged 67) Ho Chi Minh City, Vietnam

Grand Slam singles results
- French Open: 1R (1954)

Võ Văn Bảy (18 July 1931 – 24 November 1998) was a Vietnamese tennis player.

Born in Vĩnh Long, Bảy was a table tennis player in his youth and took up tennis after he moved to Saigon. He was South Vietnam's leading player from the mid-1950s through to the 1970s.

Bảy won the Malaysian Championships in 1969.

A two-time Asian Games medalist in doubles, Bảy won regular medals for South Vietnam at the SEAP Games, including a singles gold in 1961. He won six SEAP Games men's doubles gold medals.

Bảy competed for the South Vietnam Davis Cup team from 1964 to 1974, featuring in 14 ties. Most famously he won a Davis Cup rubber over the Japanese number one Toshiro Sakai at Saigon in 1972. He was 40 years of age at that time and also defeated Jun Kamiwazumi in the reverse singles.

He died in Ho Chi Minh City on 24 November 1998 due to laryngeal cancer.
