= Rupert Ferdinands =

Ceylon tennis player

- Full name: Rupert William Ferdinands
- Country (sports): Ceylon
- Born: 23 April 1936 (age 90) Ceylon

Singles
- Career titles: 8

Rupert Ferdinands (born 23 April 1936) is a former tennis player from Ceylon (now Sri Lanka).

== Career ==
Ferdinands was born in 1936 and educated at St. Thomas' College, Mount Lavinia. He graduated with a BsC from University of Ceylon. He then joined the Ceylon Brewery Nuwara Eliya. Aged 17 he was part of Ceylon's first Davis Cup squad to play Holland in 1953 (though was not selected to play his first match until 1956). He played some tournaments in England in 1953 and received coaching from Fred Perry. In 1957 he won his first singles title at the Ceylon Championships over Bernard Pinto. He won his second title in 1963 beating Bernard Pinto in five sets. In 1969 he was 2 sets to 1 down in the final against Shambunath Misra, but then "slowed down the tempo of the game" and won in five sets. In 1970 he won the title for the fourth and last time, beating S. N. Misra in the final in four sets. Ferdinands emigrated to Australia in 1972, where he became a project manager at Standards Australia and was also a tennis coach and umpire. He has a wife and three children.
