= Osamu Ishiguro =

Japanese tennis player (1936–2016)

- Country (sports): (Japan)
- Born: 12 August 1936 Nagasaki, Japan
- Died: 9 November 2016 (aged 80)
- Plays: Right-handed

Singles
- Career titles: 9

Grand Slam singles results
- Australian Open: 3R (1965)
- French Open: 2R (1964)
- Wimbledon: 3R (1963)
- US Open: 2R (1963)
Medal record
Representing Japan
Tennis
Asian Games
Gold medal – first place	1966 Bangkok	Men's singles
Bronze medal – third place	1962 Jakarta	Men's singles

Osamu Ishiguro (石黒修, Ishiguro Osamu; 12 August 1936 – 9 November 2016) was a tennis player from Japan.

== Career ==
He played his first tournament in 1959 at the Asian Championships. In 1961 he won his first title at the Japan International Championships, then won the Japan National Championships the same year. At the 1962 Asian Games, in Jakarta, Ishiguro won a singles bronze medal. In June 1962 he won the singles title at the Lowther Open in Barnes, Surrey, England against Michio Fujii.

Ishiguro had wins over Ingo Buding and Keith Carpenter in the 1963 Wimbledon Championships, to make the third round, where he lost to Jaidip Mukerjea in straight sets. The same year he then won the Japan International Championships for the second time.

He was a quarter-finalist at the London Championships in 1964. En route he managed a surprise win over American Frank Froehling, who had been a finalist in the previous year's US Championships.

In 1965, Ishiguro became the first post-war Japanese player to win a match at the Australian Championships, defeating Colin Stubs in the first round. He then beat Jean-Noël Grinda to progress to the third round, but his run would end there, losing to second seed Fred Stolle. The same year he won the All Japan Indoor Tennis Championships title in Tokyo, and the Manly Seaside Championships in Sydney against Warren Jacques.

Ishiguro was a gold medalist at the 1966 Asian Games, beating countryman Ichizo Konishi in the final. The same year he won the All Japan Indoor Tennis Championships for the second time.

He took part in 17 Davis Cup ties for Japan, from 1958 to 1966. He won 19 of his 38 matches, 15 of those in singles rubbers. He died on 9 November 2016 at the age of 80.

In 1972 he founded the Japan Professional Tennis Association and served as its first board chairman. In 1975 he played his last singles event at the Tokyo WCT.

== Personal life ==
His son is the actor Ken Ishiguro.
