= Sutarjo Sugiarto =

Indonesian tennis player

- Country (sports): Indonesia
- Born: 18 February 1937 (age 88)

Singles

Grand Slam singles results
- Australian Open: 2R (1968)
- French Open: Q2 (1970)
- Wimbledon: Q2 (1970)

Doubles

Grand Slam doubles results
- Australian Open: 1R (1966, 1968, 1970)
- French Open: 1R (1970)
- US Open: 1R (1970)

Sutarjo Sugiarto (born 18 February 1937) is an Indonesian former professional tennis player.

Sugiarto competed in four Davis Cup ties for Indonesia in the 1960s, against India, Japan and the Philippines twice. He made the second round of the 1968 Australian Championships, later featuring in the doubles main draws at the French Open and US Open.

His wife is former tennis player Lita Liem Sugiarto, with whom he won a mixed doubles bronze medal at the 1966 Asian Games in Bangkok.

== See also ==
- List of Indonesia Davis Cup team representatives
