= Raymundo Deyro =

Filipino tennis player (1928–2019)

- Country (sports): Philippines
- Born: 14 March 1928
- Died: 16 July 2019 (aged 91)

Singles

Grand Slam singles results
- French Open: 4R (1951, 1953)
- Wimbledon: 3R (1948, 1953)
- US Open: 3R (1946, 1955)
Medal record
Representing Philippines
Asian Games
Gold medal – first place	1958 Tokyo	Men's Singles
Gold medal – first place	1958 Tokyo	Men's Doubles

Raymundo Deyro (14 March 1928 – 16 July 2019) was a tennis player from the Philippines.

== Career ==
=== Asian Games ===
Deyro won two gold medals at the 1958 Asian Games in Tokyo, in the singles and men's doubles. He defeated his doubles partner Felicisimo Ampon in the singles final. The Asian Games titles were the biggest wins of Deyro's career, along with an Oslo tournament that he won in 1953, also against Ampon.

=== Davis Cup ===
Deyro began playing Davis Cup tennis in 1950 and went on to appear in a record 37 ties for the Filipino team, a national record. His 36 wins for the Philippines, 27 of which came in singles rubbers, is second only to Felicisimo Ampon. In 1955, Reymundo and Ampon won a doubles match against Kosei Kamo and Atsushi Miyagi, a Japanese pairing that would win the U.S. National Championships later in the year. He was a member of Eastern Zone winning sides in 1957, 1958, 1960 and 1964. When he made his last appearance, in 1971 against Japan, he was 43 years of age.

=== Grand Slams ===
Deyro made nine Grand Slam singles appearances during his career. In the 1946 U.S. National Championships, Deyro came close to upsetting fourth seed Alejandro Russell in the third round, but lost in five sets. He also made the third round at the 1948 Wimbledon Championships. In 1950, Deyro was eliminated in the first round of Wimbledon and the second round of the French Championships. At Wimbledon in 1951 he played against world number one Frank Sedgman in opening round and lost in straight sets. His best performance came at the 1953 French Championships, where he made it to the fourth round, before being eliminated by second seed Gardnar Mulloy. Deyro had been seeded 15th and it would be the only time he entered a Grand Slam tournament as a seeded player. In the 1953 Wimbledon Championships he had wins over Henry Billington and Tony Pickard, then lost to Australian Jack Arkinstall in a third round match that went to five sets. He again reached the final 32 at the U.S. National Championships in 1955. After a nine-year absence, Deyro made a comeback in 1964, and competed in the 1964 U.S. National Championships. He defeated Chauncey Steele III in the first round and was then beaten by Jose Luis Arilla.
