= Indonesia at the 1958 Asian Games =

- IOC code: INA
- NOC: Indonesian Olympic Committee
- Website: www.nocindonesia.or.id (in English)

in Tokyo
- Medals Ranked 14th: Gold 0 Silver 0 Bronze 6 Total 6

Asian Games appearances (overview)
- 1951; 1954; 1958; 1962; 1966; 1970; 1974; 1978; 1982; 1986; 1990; 1994; 1998; 2002; 2006; 2010; 2014; 2018; 2022; 2026

Indonesia participated in the 1958 Asian Games held in the city of Tokyo, Japan from May 24, 1958 to June 1, 1958. Indonesia won 6 bronze medals.

== Medal summary ==
=== Medal table ===
Sport	Gold	Silver	Bronze	Total
Swimming	0	0	3	3
Athletics	0	0	1	1
Football	0	0	1	1
Water polo	0	0	1	1
Total	0	0	6	6

=== Medalists ===
Medal	Name	Sport	Event	Ref
Bronze	Karnah Soekarta	Athletics	Women's javelin throw	
Bronze	Bakir; Fattah Hidayat; Muhammad Ilyas; Kurnia; Kwee Kiat Sek; Mardjoso; Paidjo; Phwa Sian Liong; Ramang; Muhammad Rasjid; Saari; Maulwi Saelan; Rukma Sudjana; Wowo Sunaryo; Omo Suratmo; Suryadi; Tan Liong Houw; Thio Him Tjiang; Henky Timisela	Football	Men's team	
Bronze	Habib Nasution	Swimming	Men's 200 m freestyle	
Bronze	Tio Tjoe Hong; Abdul Rasjid; Lie Tjoan Kiet; Habib Nasution	Swimming	Men's 4×100 m medley relay	
Bronze	Ria Tobing	Swimming	Women's 100 m breaststroke	
Bronze	Benjamin Idris; Kuswara; Liem Siong Lien; Lim Sing Lok; Lim Sing Poen; Oei Teng Pie; Rudy Oen; Tio Tjoe Hong; Nicolaas Winter	Water polo	Men	
