= 1958 Asian Games =

Multi-sport event in Tokyo, Japan

III Asian Games
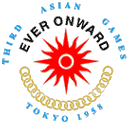
- Host city: Tokyo, Japan
- Motto: Ever Onward
- Nations: 20
- Athletes: 1,820
- Events: 112 in 13 sports
- Opening: May 24, 1958
- Closing: June 1, 1958
- Opened by: Hirohito; Emperor of Japan
- Torch lighter: Mikio Oda
- Main venue: National Stadium

The 1958 Asian Games, officially the Third Asian Games (Japanese: 第3回アジア競技大会) and commonly known as Tokyo 1958 (Japanese: 東京1958), were a multi-sport event held in Tokyo, Japan, from 24 May to 1 June 1958. It was governed by the Asian Games Federation. A total of 1,820 athletes representing 20 Asian National Olympic Committees (NOCs) participated in the Games. The program featured competitions in 13 different sports encompassing 97 events, including four non-Olympic sports, judo, table tennis, tennis and volleyball. Four of these competition sports – field hockey, table tennis, tennis and volleyball – were introduced for the first time in the Asian Games.

This is the first time that Japan hosted the Asian Games.

== Background ==
The Asian Games is a multi-sport event, much like the Summer Olympics (albeit on a much smaller scale), with participation exclusively for Asian countries. The first edition was held in the capital city of India, New Delhi, in 1951, attracting 489 competitors from 11 nations.

== Sports ==
The programme for the Tokyo 1958 Games included 13 different sports divided into 97 events. Four of these sports – judo, table tennis, tennis and volleyball – were not on the official Olympic sports programme at that time. Badminton was added as a demonstration sport, which, from 1962 onwards, became a regular competitive sport in the Asian Games. Judo was another demonstration sport.

- Athletics (31)
- Basketball (1)
- Boxing (10)
- Cycling (6)
- Diving (4)
- Field hockey (1)
- Football (1)
- Shooting (6)
- Swimming (21)
- Table tennis (7)
- Tennis (5)
- Volleyball (2)
- Water polo (1)
- Weightlifting (8)
- Wrestling (8)

== Torch relay ==
The tradition of torch relay, inspired by the Olympic Games, was introduced for the first time in the Asian Games in 1958. The relay officially began from the main venue of the Second Asian Games, Rizal Memorial Coliseum, in Manila, Philippines. In the host nation, Japan, it was relayed from Okinawa to Kyushu Island. Okinawa was under the United States administration at that time. At the opening ceremony, the Games cauldron was ignited by the first Japanese Olympic gold medallist and the first Asian Olympic champion in an individual event, Mikio Oda.

== Participating nations ==
Participating countries

A record total of 1,820 athletes representing 20 member nations of the Asian Games Federation participated in the Games. The number of participating countries was also greatest in comparison to the first two editions of the Games.

The Thai delegation held a meeting on 22 May 1958 in Tokyo, and invitations were sent to the representatives of Malaysia, Burma and Laos. The agenda of the meeting was to discuss the possibility of forming a regional multi-sport event on the lines of Asian Games for the countries of Southeast Asia. This way the Southeast Asian Peninsular Games (SEAP Games), which later became the Southeast Asian Games, were established and the first SEAP Games were held in Bangkok, Thailand, in 1959.

Number of athletes by National Olympic Committees (by highest to lowest)
IOC Letter Code	Country	Athletes
JPN	Japan	287
PHI	Philippines	152
ROC	Republic of China	136
KOR	South Korea	120
PAK	Pakistan	87
IRN	Iran	83
HKG	Hong Kong	80
MAL	Malaya	80
IND	India	79
INA	Indonesia	66
SGP	Singapore	54
THA	Thailand	47
BIR	Burma	36
VNM	South Vietnam	32
ISR	Israel	23
CAM	Cambodia	12
CEY	Ceylon	11
AFG	Afghanistan	8
NBO	North Borneo	8
NEP	Nepal	7

== Opening ceremony ==
The opening ceremony of the Tokyo 1958 Games was organised on 24 May 1958 at the National Olympic Stadium. The ceremony, among other dignitaries and guests, included the Emperor of Japan Hirohito, crown prince Akihito and Shah of Iran Mohammad Reza Pahlavi. Around 70,000 people attended the opening ceremony.

== Calendar ==
In the following calendar for the 1958 Asian Games, each blue box represents an event competition, such as a qualification round, on that day. The yellow boxes represent days during which medal-awarding finals for a sport were held. The numeral indicates the number of event finals for each sport held that day. On the left, the calendar lists each sport with events held during the Games, and at the right, how many gold medals were won in that sport. There is a key at the top of the calendar to aid the reader.

OC	Opening ceremony	●	Event competitions	1	Event finals	CC	Closing ceremony

May / June 1958	24 Sat	25 Sun	26 Mon	27 Tue	28 Wed	29 Thu	30 Fri	31 Sat	1 Sun	Gold medals
Ceremonies	OC								CC	
Athletics		5	6	6	5	9				31
Basketball		●	●	●	●	●	●	●	1	1
Boxing					●	●	●	10		10
Cycling – Road									2	2
Cycling – Track		●	1	●	2		1			4
Diving					1	1	1	1		4
Field hockey		●	●	●	●		1			1
Football		●	●	●	●		●	●	1	1
Shooting		1	2	1	●	1	1			6
Swimming					6	5	5	5		21
Table tennis		●	●	2	●	●	●	5		7
Tennis		●	●	●	●	2	3			5
Volleyball		●	●	●	●	●	●	2		2
Water polo					●	●	●	1		1
Weightlifting		2	2	2	2					8
Wrestling		●	●	8						8
Total gold medals		8	11	19	16	18	12	24	4	112
May / June 1958	24 Sat	25 Sun	26 Mon	27 Tue	28 Wed	29 Thu	30 Fri	31 Sat	1 Sun	Gold medals

== Medal table ==
Athletes from 16 countries won medals, leaving four countries without a medal, and 11 of them won at least one gold medal. Afghanistan, Cambodia, Nepal and North Borneo did not win any medal. The Japanese 4 × 100 metres medley relay team of Keiji Hase (backstroke), Masaru Furukawa (breaststroke), Manabu Koga (freestyle) and Takashi Ishimoto (butterfly) won the gold medal with a time of 4:17.2 and broke the world record.

The ranking in this table is consistent with International Olympic Committee convention in its published medal tables. By default, the table is ordered by the number of gold medals the athletes from a nation have won (in this context, a nation is an entity represented by a NOC). The number of silver medals is taken into consideration next, followed by the number of bronze medals. If nations are still tied, equal ranking is given; they are listed alphabetically by IOC country code.

The top ten ranked NOCs at these Games are listed below. The host nation, Japan, is highlighted.

* Host nation (Japan)

Rank	Nation	Gold	Silver	Bronze	Total
1	Japan (JPN)*	67	41	30	138
2	Philippines (PHI)	8	19	21	48
3	South Korea (KOR)	8	7	12	27
4	Iran (IRN)	7	14	11	32
5	Republic of China (ROC)	6	11	17	34
6	Pakistan (PAK)	6	11	9	26
7	India (IND)	5	4	4	13
8	South Vietnam (VNM)	2	0	4	6
9	Burma (BIR)	1	2	1	4
10	Singapore (SIN)	1	1	1	3
11–16	Remaining	1	2	16	19
Totals (16 entries)		112	112	126	350

Preceded by Manila	Asian Games; Tokyo; III Asiad (1958)	Succeeded by Jakarta
