= Schumacher =

Schumacher or Schuhmacher is an occupational surname (German, "shoemaker", pronounced [ˈʃuːmaxɐ]). Both variants can be used as surnames, with Schumacher being the more popular one; however, only the variant with three "h"s can also be used as a job description in modern German spelling. The variant Schumaker is also commonly seen in the USA.

Notable people with the surname include:

== Science ==
- Benjamin Schumacher, American theoretical physicist, married to Carol
- Carol Schumacher (born 1960), Bolivian-American mathematician, married to Benjamin
- E. F. Schumacher (1911–1977), British economist
- Eugen Schuhmacher (1906–1973), German zoologist and pioneer of animal documentaries
- Heinrich Christian Schumacher (1780–1850), German astronomer and mathmetician
- Heinrich Christian Friedrich Schumacher, (1757–1830), German-Danish surgeon, botanist, malacologist and anatomist
- Marta Schuhmacher, professor of environmental technology
- William Schumacher Massey (1920–2017), American mathematician

== Sports ==
- Anton Schumacher (born 1938), German football goalkeeper
- Bill Schumacher, hydroplane driver
- Cori Schumacher (born 1977), American international surfer, politician and three-time WSL Women’s World Longboard Champion
- Constantin Schumacher (born 1976), Romanian football manager and former midfielder
- David Schumacher (wrestler), (1931–2022), Australian wrestler
- David Schumacher (racing driver), (born 2001) German racing driver, son of Ralf Schumacher
- Flávio Sérgio Viana (born 1975), Brazilian futsal defender known as Schumacher
- Günther Schumacher (born 1949), German track and road cyclist and two times Olympics Men's Team Pursuit winner
- Harald Schumacher (born 1954), German football goalkeeper, West Germany team captain and one-time UEFA Euro champion
- Irma Heijting-Schuhmacher (1925–2014), Dutch freestyle swimmer
- Jessica Schumacher (born 1983), German rhythmic gymnast
- John Schuhmacher (born 1955), American football player
- Joshua Schumacher (born c. 1984), American football coach
- Katie Schumacher-Cawley (born 1980), American volleyball/basketball player and coach
- Kelly Schumacher (born 1977), Canadian WNBA basketball player and two times WNBA champion
- Kurt Schumacher (American football) (1952–2023), NFL player
- Michael Schumacher (born 1969), German Formula One driver and seven times Formula One World Champion
  - Schumacher (film) documentary from 2021 about the above
- Michael Schuhmacher (born 1957), German football player
- Mick Schumacher (born 1999), German Formula One driver, son of seven times World Champion Michael Schumacher
- Ralf Schumacher (born 1975), German DTM driver, Formula One driver, younger brother of Michael Schumacher
- Raymond R. Schumacher (1924–1973), American football player
- Sandra Schumacher (born 1966), German track and road cyclist
- Stanley Schumacher (1933–2020), Canadian politician
- Stefan Schumacher (born 1981), German road racing cyclist
- Steven Schumacher (born 1984), English football midfielder and manager
- Tony Schumacher (drag racer) (born 1969), American dragster racer and eight times NHRA Top Fuel champion

== Other ==
- Cora Schumacher (born 1976), German actress, model, racing driver and presenter
- Daniel Schuhmacher (born 1987), German singer and songwriter
- David Schumacher (producer), (born 1969), American film and television producer/presenter
- Elina Schumacher (born 1999), German politician
- Elisabeth Schumacher (1904–1942), artist and German executed Resistance fighter
- Emil Schumacher (1912–1999), German artist, co-founder of abstract art movement in Germany and representative of the "Informel" movement
- Ferdinand Schumacher (1822–1908), American entrepreneur known as "the Oatmeal King"
- Frederick W. Schumacher (1863–1957), American philanthropist and businessman
- Friedrich Schumacher, German World War I flying ace
- Fritz Schumacher (architect), (1869–1947), German architect and urban designer
- Gottlieb Schumacher (1857–1925), American civil engineer, architect and archaeologist
- Hein Schumacher (born 1971), Dutch businessman
- Ida Schumacher (1894–1956), Bavarian theatre actress and comedian
- Jean-Pierre Schumacher (1924–2021), French Trappist monk
- Joel Schumacher (1939–2020), American film director, writer and producer
- John Schumacher (Los Angeles pioneer) (about 1816–1885)
- John J. Schumacher, founded Southwestern University School of Law
- Kurt Schumacher (1895–1952), German social-democratic political leader
- Kurt Schumacher (sculptor) (1905–1942), German sculptor and executed Resistance fighter
- Martina Schumacher (born 1972), German painter and conceptual artist
- Michael J. Schumacher (1950–2025), American author and journalist
- Peder Griffenfeld (born Schumacher, 1635–1699), Danish statesman
- Thomas Schumacher, American theatrical producer
- Troy Schumacher, New York City ballet dancer
- Werner Schumacher (1921-2004), German actor
- Wim Schumacher (1894–1986), Dutch painter and designer
- Rob Schumacher (died 2026), American photojournalist

== See also ==
- David Schumacher (disambiguation)
- Gus Schumacher (disambiguation)
- John Schumacher (disambiguation)
- Kurt Schumacher (disambiguation)
- Tony Schumacher (disambiguation)
- Shoemaker (surname)
- Schumaker (surname)
