= Wrestling at the 1960 Summer Olympics – Men's freestyle lightweight =

Wrestling at the Olympics

Men's freestyle lightweight at the Games of the XVII Olympiad
- Venue: Basilica of Maxentius
- Dates: 1–6 September 1960
- Competitors: 24 from 24 nations

Medalists
1st place, gold medalist(s)		Shelby Wilson	United States
2nd place, silver medalist(s)		Volodymyr Syniavskiy	Soviet Union
3rd place, bronze medalist(s)		Enyu Valchev	Bulgaria

The men's freestyle lightweight competition at the 1960 Summer Olympics in Rome took place from 1 to 6 September at the Basilica of Maxentius. Nations were limited to one competitor. Lightweight was the fourth-lightest category, including wrestlers weighing 62 to 67 kilograms (136.7 to 147.7 lb).

== Competition format ==
This freestyle wrestling competition continued to use the "bad points" elimination system introduced at the 1928 Summer Olympics for Greco-Roman and at the 1932 Summer Olympics for freestyle wrestling, though adjusted the point values slightly. Wins by fall continued to be worth 0 points and wins by decision continued to be worth 1 point. Losses by fall, however, were now worth 4 points (up from 3). Losses by decision were worth 3 points (consistent with most prior years, though in some losses by split decision had been worth only 2 points). Ties were now allowed, worth 2 points for each wrestler. The elimination threshold was also increased from 5 points to 6 points. The medal round concept, used in 1952 and 1956 requiring a round-robin amongst the medalists even if one or more finished a round with enough points for elimination, was used only if exactly three wrestlers remained after a round—if two competitors remained, they faced off head-to-head; if only one, he was the gold medalist.

== Results ==
=== Round 1 ===
Bouts

Winner	Nation	Victory Type	Loser	Nation
Tony Ries Jr.	South Africa	Decision	Mario Tovar	Mexico
Bong Ug-won	South Korea	Decision	Rafael Duran	Venezuela
Ray Lougheed	Canada	Decision	Roger Bielle	France
Nazem Amine	Lebanon	Decision	Kenny Stephenson	Great Britain
Moustafa Tajiki	Iran	Fall	Muhammad Ashraf-Din	Pakistan
Hayrullah Şahinkaya	Turkey	Fall	Nick Stamulus	Australia
Garibaldo Nizzola	Italy	Fall	Amir Jan Khalunder	Afghanistan
Enyu Valchev	Bulgaria	Decision	Horst Bergmann	United Team of Germany
Volodymyr Syniavskiy	Soviet Union	Decision	Jan Kuczyński	Poland
Kazuo Abe	Japan	Decision	Gyula Tóth	Hungary
Shelby Wilson	United States	Decision	Parkash Gian	India
Martti Peltoniemi	Finland	Decision	José Yañez	Cuba

Points

Rank	Wrestler	Nation	Start	Earned	Total
1	Garibaldo Nizzola	Italy	0	0	0
1	Hayrullah Şahinkaya	Turkey	0	0	0
1	Moustafa Tajiki	Iran	0	0	0
4	Kazuo Abe	Japan	0	1	1
4	Nazem Amine	Lebanon	0	1	1
4	Bong Ug-won	South Korea	0	1	1
4	Ray Lougheed	Canada	0	1	1
4	Martti Peltoniemi	Finland	0	1	1
4	Tony Ries Jr.	South Africa	0	1	1
4	Volodymyr Syniavskiy	Soviet Union	0	1	1
4	Enyu Valchev	Bulgaria	0	1	1
4	Shelby Wilson	United States	0	1	1
13	Horst Bergmann	United Team of Germany	0	3	3
13	Roger Bielle	France	0	3	3
13	Rafael Duran	Venezuela	0	3	3
13	Parkash Gian	India	0	3	3
13	Jan Kuczyński	Poland	0	3	3
13	Kenny Stephenson	Great Britain	0	3	3
13	Gyula Tóth	Hungary	0	3	3
13	Mario Tovar	Mexico	0	3	3
13	José Yañez	Cuba	0	3	3
22	Muhammad Ashraf-Din	Pakistan	0	4	4
22	Amir Jan Khalunder	Afghanistan	0	4	4
22	Nick Stamulus	Australia	0	4	4

=== Round 2 ===
Bouts

Winner	Nation	Victory Type	Loser	Nation
Mario Tovar	Mexico	Fall	Rafael Duran	Venezuela
Bong Ug-won	South Korea	Decision	Tony Ries Jr.	South Africa
Ray Lougheed	Canada	Decision	Kenny Stephenson	Great Britain
Roger Bielle	France	Fall	Nazem Amine	Lebanon
Muhammad Ashraf-Din	Pakistan	Decision	Nick Stamulus	Australia
Moustafa Tajiki	Iran	Decision	Hayrullah Şahinkaya	Turkey
Enyu Valchev	Bulgaria	Fall	Amir Jan Khalunder	Afghanistan
Garibaldo Nizzola	Italy	Decision	Horst Bergmann	United Team of Germany
Volodymyr Syniavskiy	Soviet Union	Fall	Gyula Tóth	Hungary
Kazuo Abe	Japan	Fall	Jan Kuczyński	Poland
Shelby Wilson	United States	Decision	Martti Peltoniemi	Finland
Parkash Gian	India	Decision	José Yañez	Cuba

Points

Rank	Wrestler	Nation	Start	Earned	Total
1	Kazuo Abe	Japan	1	0	1
1	Garibaldo Nizzola	Italy	0	1	1
1	Volodymyr Syniavskiy	Soviet Union	1	0	1
1	Moustafa Tajiki	Iran	0	1	1
1	Enyu Valchev	Bulgaria	1	0	1
6	Bong Ug-won	South Korea	1	1	2
6	Ray Lougheed	Canada	1	1	2
6	Shelby Wilson	United States	1	1	2
9	Roger Bielle	France	3	0	3
9	Hayrullah Şahinkaya	Turkey	0	3	3
9	Mario Tovar	Mexico	3	0	3
12	Parkash Gian	India	3	1	4
12	Martti Peltoniemi	Finland	1	3	4
12	Tony Ries Jr.	South Africa	1	3	4
15	Nazem Amine	Lebanon	1	4	5
15	Muhammad Ashraf-Din	Pakistan	4	1	5
17	Horst Bergmann	United Team of Germany	3	3	6
17	Kenny Stephenson	Great Britain	3	3	6
17	José Yañez	Cuba	3	3	6
20	Rafael Duran	Venezuela	3	4	7
20	Jan Kuczyński	Poland	3	4	7
20	Nick Stamulus	Australia	4	3	7
20	Gyula Tóth	Hungary	3	4	7
24	Amir Jan Khalunder	Afghanistan	4	4	8

=== Round 3 ===
Bouts

Winner	Nation	Victory Type	Loser	Nation
Bong Ug-won	South Korea	Decision	Mario Tovar	Mexico
Tony Ries Jr.	South Africa	Decision	Ray Lougheed	Canada
Muhammad Ashraf-Din	Pakistan	Decision	Roger Bielle	France
Moustafa Tajiki	Iran	Fall	Nazem Amine	Lebanon
Hayrullah Şahinkaya	Turkey	Tie	Garibaldo Nizzola	Italy
Volodymyr Syniavskiy	Soviet Union	Decision	Enyu Valchev	Bulgaria
Shelby Wilson	United States	Decision	Kazuo Abe	Japan
Martti Peltoniemi	Finland	Decision	Parkash Gian	India

Points

Rank	Wrestler	Nation	Start	Earned	Total
1	Moustafa Tajiki	Iran	1	0	1
2	Volodymyr Syniavskiy	Soviet Union	1	1	2
3	Bong Ug-won	South Korea	2	1	3
3	Garibaldo Nizzola	Italy	1	2	3
3	Shelby Wilson	United States	2	1	3
6	Kazuo Abe	Japan	1	3	4
6	Enyu Valchev	Bulgaria	1	3	4
8	Ray Lougheed	Canada	2	3	5
8	Martti Peltoniemi	Finland	4	1	5
8	Tony Ries Jr.	South Africa	4	1	5
8	Hayrullah Şahinkaya	Turkey	3	2	5
12	Muhammad Ashraf-Din	Pakistan	5	1	6
12	Roger Bielle	France	3	3	6
12	Mario Tovar	Mexico	3	3	6
15	Parkash Gian	India	4	3	7
16	Nazem Amine	Lebanon	5	4	9

=== Round 4 ===
Bouts

Winner	Nation	Victory Type	Loser	Nation
Moustafa Tajiki	Iran	Fall	Tony Ries Jr.	South Africa
Bong Ug-won	South Korea	Decision	Ray Lougheed	Canada
Enyu Valchev	Bulgaria	Decision	Hayrullah Şahinkaya	Turkey
Garibaldo Nizzola	Italy	Fall	Kazuo Abe	Japan
Shelby Wilson	United States	Decision	Volodymyr Syniavskiy	Soviet Union
Martti Peltoniemi	Finland	Bye	N/A	N/A

Points

Rank	Wrestler	Nation	Start	Earned	Total
1	Moustafa Tajiki	Iran	1	0	1
2	Garibaldo Nizzola	Italy	3	0	3
3	Bong Ug-won	South Korea	3	1	4
3	Shelby Wilson	United States	3	1	4
5	Martti Peltoniemi	Finland	5	0	5
5	Volodymyr Syniavskiy	Soviet Union	2	3	5
5	Enyu Valchev	Bulgaria	4	1	5
8	Kazuo Abe	Japan	4	4	8
8	Ray Lougheed	Canada	5	3	8
8	Hayrullah Şahinkaya	Turkey	5	3	8
11	Tony Ries Jr.	South Africa	5	4	9

=== Round 5 ===
Bouts

Winner	Nation	Victory Type	Loser	Nation
Bong Ug-won	South Korea	Decision	Martti Peltoniemi	Finland
Enyu Valchev	Bulgaria	Fall	Moustafa Tajiki	Iran
Volodymyr Syniavskiy	Soviet Union	Fall	Garibaldo Nizzola	Italy
Shelby Wilson	United States	Bye	N/A	N/A

Points

Rank	Wrestler	Nation	Start	Earned	Total
1	Shelby Wilson	United States	4	0	4
2	Bong Ug-won	South Korea	4	1	5
2	Volodymyr Syniavskiy	Soviet Union	5	0	5
2	Enyu Valchev	Bulgaria	5	0	5
2	Moustafa Tajiki	Iran	1	4	5
6	Garibaldo Nizzola	Italy	3	4	7
7	Martti Peltoniemi	Finland	5	3	8

=== Round 6 ===
Wilson's victory over Syniavskiy in round 4 turned out to be the gold medal winning match, as those two wrestlers were the only ones left with fewer than 6 points at the end of round 6. They each had 5 points, so the tie was broken by head-to-head results. (Bong and Tajiki had not faced each other, and ties for 4th or worse place were not broken unless head-to-head results were already achieved, so they shared 4th place.)

Bouts

Winner	Nation	Victory Type	Loser	Nation
Shelby Wilson	United States	Decision	Moustafa Tajiki	Iran
Enyu Valchev	Bulgaria	Decision	Bong Ug-won	South Korea
Volodymyr Syniavskiy	Soviet Union	Bye	N/A	N/A

Points

Rank	Wrestler	Nation	Start	Earned	Total
1st place, gold medalist(s)	Shelby Wilson	United States	4	1	5
2nd place, silver medalist(s)	Volodymyr Syniavskiy	Soviet Union	5	0	5
3rd place, bronze medalist(s)	Enyu Valchev	Bulgaria	5	1	6
4	Bong Ug-won	South Korea	5	3	8
4	Moustafa Tajiki	Iran	5	3	8
