= Mexico at the 1956 Summer Olympics =

- IOC code: MEX
- NOC: Mexican Olympic Committee

in Melbourne/Stockholm
- Competitors: 24 (21 men and 3 women) in 10 sports
- Flag bearer: Joaquín Capilla
- Medals Ranked 23rd: Gold 1 Silver 0 Bronze 1 Total 2

Summer Olympics appearances (overview)
- 1900; 1904–1920; 1924; 1928; 1932; 1936; 1948; 1952; 1956; 1960; 1964; 1968; 1972; 1976; 1980; 1984; 1988; 1992; 1996; 2000; 2004; 2008; 2012; 2016; 2020; 2024; 2028

Mexico competed at the 1956 Summer Olympics in Melbourne, Australia. 24 competitors, 21 men and 3 women, took part in 20 events in 10 sports.

== Medalists ==
Medal	Name	Sport	Event	Date
Gold	Joaquín Capilla	Diving	10 m platform	6 December
Bronze	Joaquín Capilla	Diving	3 m springboard	1 December

== Athletics ==
Key

- Note–Ranks given for track events are within the athlete's heat only
- Q = Qualified for the next round
- q = Qualified for the next round as a fastest loser or, in field events, by position without achieving the qualifying target
- NR = National record
- N/A = Round not applicable for the event
- Bye = Athlete not required to compete in round

Men
Track & road events

Athlete	Event	Heat		Quarterfinal		Semifinal		Final	
Athlete	Event	Result	Rank	Result	Rank	Result	Rank	Result	Rank
René Ahumada	100 m	11.26	5	did not advance					
René Ahumada	200 m	21.96	3	did not advance					

== Cycling ==
=== Road ===
Athlete	Event	Time	Rank
Magdaleno Cano	Men's individual road race	5:53:40	9
Felipe Liñán	Men's individual road race	did not finish	
Francisco Lozano	Men's individual road race	did not finish	
Rafael Vaca	Men's individual road race	did not finish	
Magdaleno Cano; Felipe Liñán; Francisco Lozano; Rafael Vaca	Men's team road race	did not finish	

== Diving ==
Athlete	Event	Preliminaries		Final			
Athlete	Event	Points	Rank	Points	Rank	Total	Rank
Juan Botella	3 m springboard	78.27	9 Q	49.05	12	127.32	10
Joaquín Capilla	3 m springboard	90.24	1 Q	60.45	3	150.69	3rd place, bronze medalist(s)
Juan Botella	10 m platform	69.39	12 Q	56.06	10	125.45	10
Alberto Capilla	10 m platform	74.18	7 Q	58.56	9	132.74	9
Joaquín Capilla	10 m platform	78.68	2 Q	73.76	2	152.44	1st place, gold medalist(s)

== Fencing ==
Men

Athlete	Event	Round 1			Quarterfinals			Semifinals			Final		
Athlete	Event	MW	ML	Rank	MW	ML	Rank	MW	ML	Rank	MW	ML	Rank
Benito Ramos	Men's foil	—N/a			2	4	6	did not advance					
Luis Jiménez	Men's épée	0	6	7	did not advance								
Benito Ramos	Men's sabre	1	4	4 Q	0	5	7	did not advance					

Women

Athlete	Event	Round 1			Quarterfinals			Semifinals			Final		
Athlete	Event	MW	ML	Rank	MW	ML	Rank	MW	ML	Rank	MW	ML	Rank
Pilar Roldán	Women's foil	4	3	4 Q	—N/a			1	4	6	did not advance		

== Modern pentathlon ==
Three male pentathletes represented Mexico in 1956.

Individual

- José Pérez
- Antonio Almada
- David Romero

Team

- José Pérez
- Antonio Almada
- David Romero

== Rowing ==
Athlete	Event	Heat		Repechage		Quarterfinal		Semifinal		Final	
Athlete	Event	Time	Rank	Time	Rank	Time	Rank	Time	Rank	Time	Rank
Jorge Roesler	Single sculls	8:24.3	4 R	did not finish		—N/a		did not advance			

== Shooting ==
Athlete	Event	Final	
Athlete	Event	Points	Rank
Alfonso Castañeda	25 m rapid fire pistol	571	11
Rodolfo Flores	25 m rapid fire pistol	556	19
Rodolfo Flores	50 metre pistol	507	26
Raúl Ibarra	50 metre pistol	533	15

== Swimming ==
Men

Athlete	Event	Heat		Semifinal		Final	
Athlete	Event	Time	Rank	Time	Rank	Time	Rank
Walter Ocampo	200 m butterfly	2:41.4	6	—N/a		did not advance	
Eulalio Ríos Alemán	200 m butterfly	2:28.1	3 Q	—N/a		2:27.3	6

Women

Athlete	Event	Heat		Semifinal		Final	
Athlete	Event	Time	Rank	Time	Rank	Time	Rank
Blanca Barrón	100 m freestyle	1:09.5	5	did not advance			
Gilda Aranda	400 m freestyle	5:24.2	6	—N/a		did not advance	

== Weightlifting ==
Athlete	Event	Clean & Press		Snatch		Clean & Jerk		Total	
Athlete	Event	Result	Rank	Result	Rank	Result	Rank	Result	Rank
Guillermo Balboa	−67.5 kg	92.5	17	100	=11	127.5	=15	320	17

== Wrestling ==
Wrestlers who accumulated 5 "bad points" were eliminated. Points were given as follows: 1 point for victories short of a fall and 3 points for every loss.

Athlete	Event	Round 1	Round 2	Round 3	Round 4	Round 5	Final	Points	Rank
Athlete	Event	Opposition Result	Opposition Result	Opposition Result	Opposition Result	Opposition Result	Opposition Result	Points	Rank
Mario Tovar González	–67 kg	Tanaquin (PHI); W ^{F}	Ashraf (PAK); W 2-1 ^{D}	Evans (USA); L 3-0 ^{D}	Kasahara (JPN); L ^{F}	did not advance			
