= Wrestling at the 1960 Summer Olympics – Men's Greco-Roman lightweight =

Wrestling at the Olympics

Men's Greco-Roman lightweight at the Games of the XVII Olympiad
- Venue: Basilica of Maxentius
- Dates: 26–31 August 1960
- Competitors: 23 from 23 nations

Medalists
1st place, gold medalist(s)		Avtandil Koridze	Soviet Union
2nd place, silver medalist(s)		Branislav Martinović	Yugoslavia
3rd place, bronze medalist(s)		Gustav Freij	Sweden

The men's Greco-Roman lightweight competition at the 1960 Summer Olympics in Rome took place from 26 to 31 August at the Basilica of Maxentius. Nations were limited to one competitor. Lightweight was the fourth-lightest category, including wrestlers weighing 62 to 67 kilograms (136.7 to 147.7 lb).

== Competition format ==
This Greco-Roman wrestling competition continued to use the "bad points" elimination system introduced at the 1928 Summer Olympics for Greco-Roman and at the 1932 Summer Olympics for freestyle wrestling, though adjusted the point values slightly. Wins by fall continued to be worth 0 points and wins by decision continued to be worth 1 point. Losses by fall, however, were now worth 4 points (up from 3). Losses by decision were worth 3 points (consistent with most prior years, though in some losses by split decision had been worth only 2 points). Ties were now allowed, worth 2 points for each wrestler. The elimination threshold was also increased from 5 points to 6 points. The medal round concept, used in 1952 and 1956 requiring a round-robin amongst the medalists even if one or more finished a round with enough points for elimination, was used only if exactly three wrestlers remained after a round—if two competitors remained, they faced off head-to-head; if only one, he was the gold medalist.

== Results ==
Stoyanov was disqualified after round 5 and his place in the standings vacated; the results below show the placement of wrestlers following that disqualification, which retroactively moved other wrestlers up in the standings.

=== Round 1 ===
Bouts

Winner	Nation	Victory Type	Loser	Nation
Avtandil Koridze	Soviet Union	Decision	Mario De Silva	Italy
Kyösti Lehtonen	Finland	Decision	Ben Northrup	United States
Mitsuharu Kitamura	Japan	Fall	Mohamed Moukrim Ben Mansour	Morocco
Dimitar Stoyanov	Bulgaria	Decision	Ibrahim Awariki	Lebanon
Ernest Gondzik	Poland	Decision	Erik Thomsen	Denmark
Adil Güngör	Turkey	Decision	Edmund Seger	United Team of Germany
Bartl Brötzner	Austria	Decision	Leo Piek	Netherlands
Roger Skauen	Norway	Decision	Nick Stamulus	Australia
Branislav Martinović	Yugoslavia	Decision	Dumitru Gheorghe	Romania
Gustav Freij	Sweden	Decision	Hernando Delgado	Spain
Anastasios Mousidis	Greece	Decision	Jacques Pourtau	France
Karel Matoušek	Czechoslovakia	Bye	N/A	N/A

Points

Rank	Wrestler	Nation	Start	Earned	Total
1	Mitsuharu Kitamura	Japan	0	0	0
1	Karel Matoušek	Czechoslovakia	0	0	0
3	Bartl Brötzner	Austria	0	1	1
3	Gustav Freij	Sweden	0	1	1
3	Ernest Gondzik	Poland	0	1	1
3	Adil Güngör	Turkey	0	1	1
3	Avtandil Koridze	Soviet Union	0	1	1
3	Kyösti Lehtonen	Finland	0	1	1
3	Branislav Martinović	Yugoslavia	0	1	1
3	Anastasios Mousidis	Greece	0	1	1
3	Roger Skauen	Norway	0	1	1
3*	Dimitar Stoyanov	Bulgaria	0	1	1
12	Ibrahim Awariki	Lebanon	0	3	3
12	Mario De Silva	Italy	0	3	3
12	Hernando Delgado	Spain	0	3	3
12	Dumitru Gheorghe	Romania	0	3	3
12	Ben Northrup	United States	0	3	3
12	Leo Piek	Netherlands	0	3	3
12	Jacques Pourtau	France	0	3	3
12	Edmund Seger	United Team of Germany	0	3	3
12	Nick Stamulus	Australia	0	3	3
12	Erik Thomsen	Denmark	0	3	3
22	Mohamed Moukrim Ben Mansour	Morocco	0	4	4

=== Round 2 ===
Bouts

Winner	Nation	Victory Type	Loser	Nation
Karel Matoušek	Czechoslovakia	Decision	Mario De Silva	Italy
Avtandil Koridze	Soviet Union	Decision	Ben Northrup	United States
Kyösti Lehtonen	Finland	Decision	Mitsuharu Kitamura	Japan
Ibrahim Awariki	Lebanon	Decision	Mohamed Moukrim Ben Mansour	Morocco
Dimitar Stoyanov	Bulgaria	Tie	Ernest Gondzik	Poland
Erik Thomsen	Denmark	Fall	Edmund Seger	United Team of Germany
Adil Güngör	Turkey	Tie	Bartl Brötzner	Austria
Leo Piek	Netherlands	Decision	Nick Stamulus	Australia
Dumitru Gheorghe	Romania	Fall	Roger Skauen	Norway
Branislav Martinović	Yugoslavia	Tie	Gustav Freij	Sweden
Jacques Pourtau	France	Decision	Hernando Delgado	Spain
Anastasios Mousidis	Greece	Bye	N/A	N/A

Points

Rank	Wrestler	Nation	Start	Earned	Total
1	Karel Matoušek	Czechoslovakia	0	1	1
1	Anastasios Mousidis	Greece	1	0	1
3	Avtandil Koridze	Soviet Union	1	1	2
3	Kyösti Lehtonen	Finland	1	1	2
5	Bartl Brötzner	Austria	1	2	3
5	Gustav Freij	Sweden	1	2	3
5	Dumitru Gheorghe	Romania	3	0	3
5	Ernest Gondzik	Poland	1	2	3
5	Adil Güngör	Turkey	1	2	3
5	Mitsuharu Kitamura	Japan	0	3	3
5	Branislav Martinović	Yugoslavia	1	2	3
5*	Dimitar Stoyanov	Bulgaria	1	2	3
5	Erik Thomsen	Denmark	3	0	3
13	Ibrahim Awariki	Lebanon	3	1	4
13	Leo Piek	Netherlands	3	1	4
13	Jacques Pourtau	France	3	1	4
16	Roger Skauen	Norway	1	4	5
17	Mario De Silva	Italy	3	3	6
17	Hernando Delgado	Spain	3	3	6
17	Ben Northrup	United States	3	3	6
17	Nick Stamulus	Australia	3	3	6
21	Mohamed Moukrim Ben Mansour	Morocco	4	3	7
21	Edmund Seger	United Team of Germany	3	4	7

=== Round 3 ===
Bouts

Winner	Nation	Victory Type	Loser	Nation
Karel Matoušek	Czechoslovakia	Decision	Anastasios Mousidis	Greece
Avtandil Koridze	Soviet Union	Tie	Kyösti Lehtonen	Finland
Mitsuharu Kitamura	Japan	Tie	Ibrahim Awariki	Lebanon
Dimitar Stoyanov	Bulgaria	Decision	Erik Thomsen	Denmark
Ernest Gondzik	Poland	Tie	Adil Güngör	Turkey
Bartl Brötzner	Austria	Tie	Roger Skauen	Norway
Branislav Martinović	Yugoslavia	Fall	Leo Piek	Netherlands
Dumitru Gheorghe	Romania	Tie	Gustav Freij	Sweden
Jacques Pourtau	France	Bye	N/A	N/A

Points

Rank	Wrestler	Nation	Start	Earned	Total
1	Karel Matoušek	Czechoslovakia	1	1	2
2	Branislav Martinović	Yugoslavia	3	0	3
3	Avtandil Koridze	Soviet Union	2	2	4
3	Kyösti Lehtonen	Finland	2	2	4
3	Anastasios Mousidis	Greece	1	3	4
3	Jacques Pourtau	France	4	0	4
3*	Dimitar Stoyanov	Bulgaria	3	1	4
7	Bartl Brötzner	Austria	3	2	5
7	Gustav Freij	Sweden	3	2	5
7	Dumitru Gheorghe	Romania	3	2	5
7	Ernest Gondzik	Poland	3	2	5
7	Adil Güngör	Turkey	3	2	5
7	Mitsuharu Kitamura	Japan	3	2	5
13	Ibrahim Awariki	Lebanon	4	2	6
13	Erik Thomsen	Denmark	3	3	6
15	Roger Skauen	Norway	5	2	7
16	Leo Piek	Netherlands	4	4	8

=== Round 4 ===
The six-way tie for 5th place was not broken. It is not clear how the tie between Mousidis and Brötzner for 11th place was broken; the two had not faced each other.

Bouts

Winner	Nation	Victory Type	Loser	Nation
Karel Matoušek	Czechoslovakia	Decision	Jacques Pourtau	France
Avtandil Koridze	Soviet Union	Fall	Anastasios Mousidis	Greece
Dimitar Stoyanov	Bulgaria	Decision	Kyösti Lehtonen	Finland
Mitsuharu Kitamura	Japan	Tie	Ernest Gondzik	Poland
Adil Güngör	Turkey	Tie	Dumitru Gheorghe	Romania
Branislav Martinović	Yugoslavia	Decision	Bartl Brötzner	Austria
Gustav Freij	Sweden	Bye	N/A	N/A

Points

Rank	Wrestler	Nation	Start	Earned	Total
1	Karel Matoušek	Czechoslovakia	2	1	3
2	Avtandil Koridze	Soviet Union	4	0	4
2	Branislav Martinović	Yugoslavia	3	1	4
4	Gustav Freij	Sweden	5	0	5
4*	Dimitar Stoyanov	Bulgaria	4	1	5
5	Dumitru Gheorghe	Romania	5	2	7
5	Ernest Gondzik	Poland	5	2	7
5	Adil Güngör	Turkey	5	2	7
5	Mitsuharu Kitamura	Japan	5	2	7
5	Kyösti Lehtonen	Finland	4	3	7
5	Jacques Pourtau	France	4	3	7
11	Anastasios Mousidis	Greece	4	4	8
12	Bartl Brötzner	Austria	5	3	8

=== Round 5 ===
Freij's victory by decision over Matoušek resulted in both wrestlers having 6 points after the round and thus eliminated both wrestlers. Because Freij was the head-to-head victor, he held the tie-breaker and received the bronze medal.

During the bout between Koridze and Stoyanov, "the two spoke briefly and then Stoyanov stopped fighting and lost a decision." Yugoslavia protested the result of this match; a Stoyanov victory by decision would have eliminated both Koridze and Stoyanov, leaving Martinović the only remaining wrestler and therefore the gold medalist. Stoyanov was disqualified, stripping him of his 5th-place finish, but Koridze was not sanctioned and continued on to face Martinović in round 6.

Bouts

Winner	Nation	Victory Type	Loser	Nation
Gustav Freij	Sweden	Decision	Karel Matoušek	Czechoslovakia
Avtandil Koridze	Soviet Union	Decision	Dimitar Stoyanov	Bulgaria
Branislav Martinović	Yugoslavia	Bye	N/A	N/A

Points

Rank	Wrestler	Nation	Start	Earned	Total
1	Branislav Martinović	Yugoslavia	4	0	4
2	Avtandil Koridze	Soviet Union	4	1	5
3rd place, bronze medalist(s)	Gustav Freij	Sweden	5	1	6
4	Karel Matoušek	Czechoslovakia	3	3	6
DQ	Dimitar Stoyanov	Bulgaria	5	3	8

=== Round 6 ===
Bouts

Winner	Nation	Victory Type	Loser	Nation
Avtandil Koridze	Soviet Union	Decision	Branislav Martinović	Yugoslavia

Points

Rank	Wrestler	Nation	Start	Earned	Total
1st place, gold medalist(s)	Avtandil Koridze	Soviet Union	5	1	6
2nd place, silver medalist(s)	Branislav Martinović	Yugoslavia	4	3	7
