= Wrestling at the 1956 Summer Olympics – Men's freestyle lightweight =

Wrestling at the Olympics

Men's freestyle lightweight at the Games of the XVI Olympiad
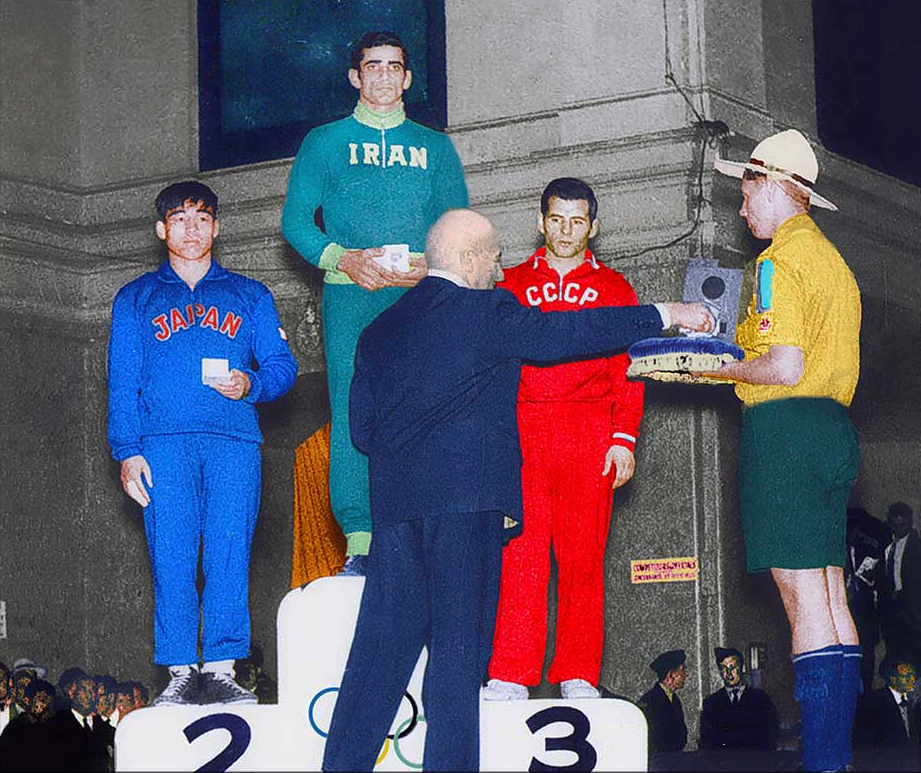
- The final podium.
- Venue: Royal Exhibition Building
- Dates: 28 November–1 December 1956
- Competitors: 19 from 19 nations

Medalists
1st place, gold medalist(s)		Emam-Ali Habibi	Iran
2nd place, silver medalist(s)		Shigeru Kasahara	Japan
3rd place, bronze medalist(s)		Alimbeg Bestaev	Soviet Union

The men's freestyle lightweight competition at the 1956 Summer Olympics in Melbourne took place from 28 November to 1 December at the Royal Exhibition Building. Nations were limited to one competitor. Lightweight was the fourth-lightest category, including wrestlers weighing 62 to 67 kilograms (137 to 148 lb).

== Competition format ==
This freestyle wrestling competition continued to use the "bad points" elimination system introduced at the 1928 Summer Olympics for Greco-Roman and at the 1932 Summer Olympics for freestyle wrestling, as modified in 1952 (adding medal rounds and making all losses worth 3 points—from 1936 to 1948 losses by split decision only cost 2). Each round featured all wrestlers pairing off and wrestling one bout (with one wrestler having a bye if there were an odd number). The loser received 3 points. The winner received 1 point if the win was by decision and 0 points if the win was by fall. At the end of each round, any wrestler with at least 5 points was eliminated. This elimination continued until the medal rounds, which began when 3 wrestlers remained. These 3 wrestlers each faced each other in a round-robin medal round (with earlier results counting, if any had wrestled another before); record within the medal round determined medals, with bad points breaking ties.

== Results ==
=== Round 1 ===
Bouts

Winner	Nation	Victory Type	Loser	Nation
Muhammad Ashraf	Pakistan	Fall	O Tae-geun	South Korea
Mario Tovar	Mexico	Fall	Mateo Tanaquin	Philippines
Jay Thomas Evans	United States	Fall	Jack Taylor	Great Britain
Shigeru Kasahara	Japan	Fall	David Schumacher	Australia
Gyula Tóth	Hungary	Fall	Juan Rolón	Argentina
Emam-Ali Habibi	Iran	Fall	Olle Anderberg	Sweden
Roger Bielle	France	Decision, 2–1	Väinö Hakkarainen	Finland
Garibaldo Nizzola	Italy	Fall	Lakhshmi Kant Pandey	India
Adil Güngör	Turkey	Decision, 3–0	Georgi Zaychev	Bulgaria
Alimbeg Bestaev	Soviet Union	Bye	N/A	N/A

Points

Rank	Wrestler	Nation	Start	Earned	Total
1	Muhammad Ashraf	Pakistan	0	0	0
1	Alimbeg Bestaev	Soviet Union	0	0	0
1	Jay Thomas Evans	United States	0	0	0
1	Emam-Ali Habibi	Iran	0	0	0
1	Shigeru Kasahara	Japan	0	0	0
1	Garibaldo Nizzola	Italy	0	0	0
1	Gyula Tóth	Hungary	0	0	0
1	Mario Tovar	Mexico	0	0	0
9	Roger Bielle	France	0	1	1
9	Adil Güngör	Turkey	0	1	1
11	Olle Anderberg	Sweden	0	3	3
11	Väinö Hakkarainen	Finland	0	3	3
11	O Tae-geun	South Korea	0	3	3
11	Lakhshmi Kant Pandey	India	0	3	3
11	Juan Rolón	Argentina	0	3	3
11	David Schumacher	Australia	0	3	3
11	Mateo Tanaquin	Philippines	0	3	3
11	Jack Taylor	Great Britain	0	3	3
11	Georgi Zaychev	Bulgaria	0	3	3

=== Round 2 ===
Bouts

Winner	Nation	Victory Type	Loser	Nation
Alimbeg Bestaev	Soviet Union	Fall	O Tae-geun	South Korea
Mario Tovar	Mexico	Decision, 2–1	Muhammad Ashraf	Pakistan
Jack Taylor	Great Britain	Decision, 3–0	Mateo Tanaquin	Philippines
Jay Thomas Evans	United States	Decision, 3–0	Shigeru Kasahara	Japan
Juan Rolón	Argentina	Decision, 3–0	David Schumacher	Australia
Emam-Ali Habibi	Iran	Decision, 3–0	Gyula Tóth	Hungary
Olle Anderberg	Sweden	Decision, 2–1	Väinö Hakkarainen	Finland
Garibaldo Nizzola	Italy	Decision, 2–1	Roger Bielle	France
Adil Güngör	Turkey	Decision, 3–0	Lakhshmi Kant Pandey	India
Georgi Zaychev	Bulgaria	Bye	N/A	N/A

Points

Rank	Wrestler	Nation	Start	Earned	Total
1	Alimbeg Bestaev	Soviet Union	0	0	0
2	Jay Thomas Evans	United States	0	1	1
2	Emam-Ali Habibi	Iran	0	1	1
2	Garibaldo Nizzola	Italy	0	1	1
2	Mario Tovar	Mexico	0	1	1
6	Adil Güngör	Turkey	1	1	2
7	Muhammad Ashraf	Pakistan	0	3	3
7	Shigeru Kasahara	Japan	0	3	3
7	Gyula Tóth	Hungary	0	3	3
7	Georgi Zaychev	Bulgaria	3	0	3
11	Olle Anderberg	Sweden	3	1	4
11	Roger Bielle	France	1	3	4
11	Juan Rolón	Argentina	3	1	4
11	Jack Taylor	Great Britain	3	1	4
15	Väinö Hakkarainen	Finland	3	3	6
15	O Tae-geun	South Korea	3	3	6
15	Lakhshmi Kant Pandey	India	3	3	6
15	David Schumacher	Australia	3	3	6
15	Mateo Tanaquin	Philippines	3	3	6

=== Round 3 ===
Anderberg was injured and withdrew.

Bouts

Winner	Nation	Victory Type	Loser	Nation
Alimbeg Bestaev	Soviet Union	Fall	Georgi Zaychev	Bulgaria
Muhammad Ashraf	Pakistan	Decision, 3–0	Jack Taylor	Great Britain
Jay Thomas Evans	United States	Decision, 3–0	Mario Tovar	Mexico
Shigeru Kasahara	Japan	Fall	Juan Rolón	Argentina
Gyula Tóth	Hungary	Forfeit	Olle Anderberg	Sweden
Emam-Ali Habibi	Iran	Decision, 3–0	Roger Bielle	France
Garibaldo Nizzola	Italy	Decision, 2–1	Adil Güngör	Turkey

Points

Rank	Wrestler	Nation	Start	Earned	Total
1	Alimbeg Bestaev	Soviet Union	0	0	0
2	Jay Thomas Evans	United States	1	1	2
2	Emam-Ali Habibi	Iran	1	1	2
2	Garibaldo Nizzola	Italy	1	1	2
5	Shigeru Kasahara	Japan	3	0	3
5	Gyula Tóth	Hungary	3	0	3
7	Muhammad Ashraf	Pakistan	3	1	4
7	Mario Tovar	Mexico	1	3	4
9	Adil Güngör	Turkey	2	3	5
10	Georgi Zaychev	Bulgaria	3	3	6
11	Olle Anderberg	Sweden	4	3	7
11	Roger Bielle	France	4	3	7
11	Juan Rolón	Argentina	4	3	7
11	Jack Taylor	Great Britain	4	3	7

=== Round 4 ===
Bouts

Winner	Nation	Victory Type	Loser	Nation
Alimbeg Bestaev	Soviet Union	Fall	Muhammad Ashraf	Pakistan
Shigeru Kasahara	Japan	Fall	Mario Tovar	Mexico
Gyula Tóth	Hungary	Decision, 3–0	Jay Thomas Evans	United States
Emam-Ali Habibi	Iran	Decision, 3–0	Garibaldo Nizzola	Italy

Points

Rank	Wrestler	Nation	Start	Earned	Total
1	Alimbeg Bestaev	Soviet Union	0	0	0
2	Emam-Ali Habibi	Iran	2	1	3
2	Shigeru Kasahara	Japan	3	0	3
4	Gyula Tóth	Hungary	3	1	4
5	Jay Thomas Evans	United States	2	3	5
5	Garibaldo Nizzola	Italy	2	3	5
7	Muhammad Ashraf	Pakistan	4	3	7
7	Mario Tovar	Mexico	4	3	7

=== Round 5 ===
It is unclear why Tóth finished fourth despite having fewer bad points than Kasahara, who advanced to the medal rounds, at the end of this round.

Bouts

Winner	Nation	Victory Type	Loser	Nation
Gyula Tóth	Hungary	Decision, 2–1	Alimbeg Bestaev	Soviet Union
Emam-Ali Habibi	Iran	Decision, 3–0	Shigeru Kasahara	Japan

Points

Rank	Wrestler	Nation	Start	Earned	Total
1	Alimbeg Bestaev	Soviet Union	0	3	3
2	Emam-Ali Habibi	Iran	3	1	4
3	Shigeru Kasahara	Japan	3	3	6
4	Gyula Tóth	Hungary	4	1	5

=== Medal rounds ===
Habibi's round 5 victory over Kasahara counted for the medal rounds. Habibi also defeated Bestaev, taking the gold medal with a 2–0 record against the other medalists. Kasahara never faced Bestaev; it is unclear how the silver and bronze medals were decided.

Bouts

Winner	Nation	Victory Type	Loser	Nation
Emam-Ali Habibi	Iran	Fall	Alimbeg Bestaev	Soviet Union

Points

Rank	Wrestler	Nation	Wins	Losses
1st place, gold medalist(s)	Emam-Ali Habibi	Iran	2	0
2nd place, silver medalist(s)	Shigeru Kasahara	Japan	0	1
3rd place, bronze medalist(s)	Alimbeg Bestaev	Soviet Union	0	1
