= Shoemaker (surname) =

Shoemaker is an occupational surname.

== People with the name ==
- Adam Shoemaker, Egyptian-American Episcopal clergyman
- Ann Shoemaker (1891–1978), American actress
- Benjamin Shoemaker (1704–c. 1767), mayor of Philadelphia during the 18th century
- Bill Shoemaker (1931–2003), American jockey
- Carolyn S. Shoemaker (1929–2021), astronomer and co-discoverer of Comet Shoemaker-Levy 9
- Charles F. Shoemaker (1841–1913), Commandant from 1895 through 1905 of the United States Revenue Cutter Service
- Christine Shoemaker, American environmental engineer
- Craig Shoemaker (born 1958), American comedian
- David Shoemaker (born 1964), American philosopher
- Deirdre Shoemaker (born 1971), American physicist
- Dora Adele Shoemaker (1873–1962), American educator, writer
- Douglas Harlow Shoemaker (1905–1985), last Chief Engineer of the Northern Pacific Railway
- Eugene Merle Shoemaker (1928–1997), planetary scientist and co-discoverer of Comet Shoemaker-Levy 9
- Francis Shoemaker (1889–1958), member of the U.S. House of Representatives from Minnesota from 1933 to 1935
- Harold Goodman Shoemaker (1892–1918), American pursuit pilot
- Henry W. Shoemaker (1880–1958), American folklorist, diplomat, and writer
- Jarrod Shoemaker (born 1982), American triathlete
- Jenna Shoemaker (born 1984), American professional triathlete
- John Shoemaker (born 1956), American baseball coach and manager
- John Bruce Shoemaker, co-author of The Black Hope Horror
- Kate Shoemaker (born 1987), American para-equestrian
- Keegan Shoemaker (born 2001), American football player
- Lazarus Denison Shoemaker (1819–1893), member of the U.S. House of Representatives from Pennsylvania during the 1870s
- Matt Shoemaker (born 1986) American baseball player
- Mike Shoemaker (born 1945), politician from Ohio
- Myrl Shoemaker (1913–1985), former lieutenant governor of Ohio and father of Mike Shoemaker
- Robert M. Shoemaker (1924–2017), U.S. Army general
- Sam Shoemaker (1893–1963), American reverend
- Sydney Shoemaker (1931–2022), American philosopher
- Sylvia Browne (1936–2013), born Sylvia Celeste Shoemaker, American author
- Trina Shoemaker (born 1965), music producer and technician

== See also ==
- Schumaker, a surname
- Schumacher, a surname
