= Wrestling at the 1956 Summer Olympics – Men's Greco-Roman lightweight =

Wrestling at the Olympics

Men's Greco-Roman lightweight at the Games of the XVI Olympiad
- Venue: Royal Exhibition Building
- Dates: 3–6 December 1956
- Competitors: 10 from 10 nations

Medalists
1st place, gold medalist(s)		Kyösti Lehtonen	Finland
2nd place, silver medalist(s)		Rıza Doğan	Turkey
3rd place, bronze medalist(s)		Gyula Tóth	Hungary

The men's Greco-Roman lightweight competition at the 1956 Summer Olympics in Melbourne took place from 3 December to 6 December at the Royal Exhibition Building. Nations were limited to one competitor. Lightweight was the fourth-lightest category, including wrestlers weighing 62 to 67 kilograms (136.7 to 147.7 lb).

== Competition format ==
This Greco-Roman wrestling competition continued to use the "bad points" elimination system introduced at the 1928 Summer Olympics for Greco-Roman and at the 1932 Summer Olympics for freestyle wrestling, as modified in 1952 (adding medal rounds and making all losses worth 3 points—from 1936 to 1948 losses by split decision only cost 2). Each round featured all wrestlers pairing off and wrestling one bout (with one wrestler having a bye if there were an odd number). The loser received 3 points. The winner received 1 point if the win was by decision and 0 points if the win was by fall. At the end of each round, any wrestler with at least 5 points was eliminated. This elimination continued until the medal rounds, which began when 3 wrestlers remained. These 3 wrestlers each faced each other in a round-robin medal round (with earlier results counting, if any had wrestled another before); record within the medal round determined medals, with bad points breaking ties.

== Results ==
=== Round 1 ===
Bouts

Winner	Nation	Victory Type	Loser	Nation
Dimitar Stoyanov	Bulgaria	Decision, 3–0	Olle Anderberg	Sweden
Kyösti Lehtonen	Finland	Fall	Tommy Evans	United States
Bartl Brötzner	Austria	Decision, 3–0	Vladimir Rosin	Soviet Union
Rıza Doğan	Turkey	Decision, 3–0	Juan Rolón	Argentina
Gyula Tóth	Hungary	Fall	Dumitru Gheorghe	Romania

Points

Rank	Wrestler	Nation	Start	Earned	Total
1	Kyösti Lehtonen	Finland	0	0	0
1	Gyula Tóth	Hungary	0	0	0
3	Bartl Brötzner	Austria	0	1	1
3	Rıza Doğan	Turkey	0	1	1
3	Dimitar Stoyanov	Bulgaria	0	1	1
6	Olle Anderberg	Sweden	0	3	3
6	Tommy Evans	United States	0	3	3
6	Dumitru Gheorghe	Romania	0	3	3
6	Juan Rolón	Argentina	0	3	3
6	Vladimir Rosin	Soviet Union	0	3	3

=== Round 2 ===
Bouts

Winner	Nation	Victory Type	Loser	Nation
Kyösti Lehtonen	Finland	Walkover	Olle Anderberg	Sweden
Dimitar Stoyanov	Bulgaria	Decision, 3–0	Tommy Evans	United States
Bartl Brötzner	Austria	Decision, 2–1	Rıza Doğan	Turkey
Gyula Tóth	Hungary	Decision, 2–1	Vladimir Rosin	Soviet Union
Dumitru Gheorghe	Romania	Decision, 3–0	Juan Rolón	Argentina

Points

Rank	Wrestler	Nation	Start	Earned	Total
1	Kyösti Lehtonen	Finland	0	0	0
2	Gyula Tóth	Hungary	0	1	1
3	Bartl Brötzner	Austria	1	1	2
3	Dimitar Stoyanov	Bulgaria	1	1	2
5	Rıza Doğan	Turkey	1	3	4
6	Dumitru Gheorghe	Romania	3	1	4
7	Olle Anderberg	Sweden	3	3	6
7	Tommy Evans	United States	3	3	6
7	Juan Rolón	Argentina	3	3	6
7	Vladimir Rosin	Soviet Union	3	3	6

=== Round 3 ===
Brötzner, Stoyanov, and Doğan went to a round-robin.

Bouts

Winner	Nation	Victory Type	Loser	Nation
Kyösti Lehtonen	Finland	Decision, 3–0	Dimitar Stoyanov	Bulgaria
Gyula Tóth	Hungary	Decision, 3–0	Bartl Brötzner	Austria
Rıza Doğan	Turkey	Decision, 3–0	Dumitru Gheorghe	Romania

Points

Rank	Wrestler	Nation	Start	Earned	Total
1	Kyösti Lehtonen	Finland	0	1	1
2	Gyula Tóth	Hungary	1	1	2
3	Rıza Doğan	Turkey	4	1	5
3	Bartl Brötzner	Austria	2	3	5
3	Dimitar Stoyanov	Bulgaria	2	3	5
6	Dumitru Gheorghe	Romania	4	3	7

=== Elimination rounds ===
Stoyanov defeated Brötzner, while Doğan defeated Stoyanov. Doğan and Brötzner had already wrestled and did not face each other again.

Bouts

Winner	Nation	Victory Type	Loser	Nation
Dimitar Stoyanov	Bulgaria	Decision, 3–0	Bartl Brötzner	Austria
Rıza Doğan	Turkey	Decision, 2–1	Dimitar Stoyanov	Bulgaria
Gyula Tóth	Hungary	Bye	N/A	N/A
Rıza Doğan	Turkey	Bye	N/A	N/A
Kyösti Lehtonen	Finland	Bye	N/A	N/A

Points

Rank	Wrestler	Nation	Start	Earned	Total
1	Kyösti Lehtonen	Finland	1	0	1
2	Gyula Tóth	Hungary	2	0	2
3	Rıza Doğan	Turkey	5	1	6
4	Bartl Brötzner	Austria	5	3	8
5	Dimitar Stoyanov	Bulgaria	5	4	9

=== Medal rounds ===
Lehtonen won the round robin among the medalists, 2–0; Doğan took silver at 1–1 and Tóth received bronze after being defeated by both of the other medalists.

Bouts

Winner	Nation	Victory Type	Loser	Nation
Kyösti Lehtonen	Finland	Decision, 2–1	Rıza Doğan	Turkey
Rıza Doğan	Turkey	Fall	Gyula Tóth	Hungary
Kyösti Lehtonen	Finland	Fall	Gyula Tóth	Hungary

Points

Rank	Wrestler	Nation	Wins	Losses
1st place, gold medalist(s)	Kyösti Lehtonen	Finland	2	0
2nd place, silver medalist(s)	Rıza Doğan	Turkey	1	1
3rd place, bronze medalist(s)	Gyula Tóth	Hungary	0	2
