= Lincoln-Sudbury Regional High School =

Public school in Sudbury, Massachusetts, US

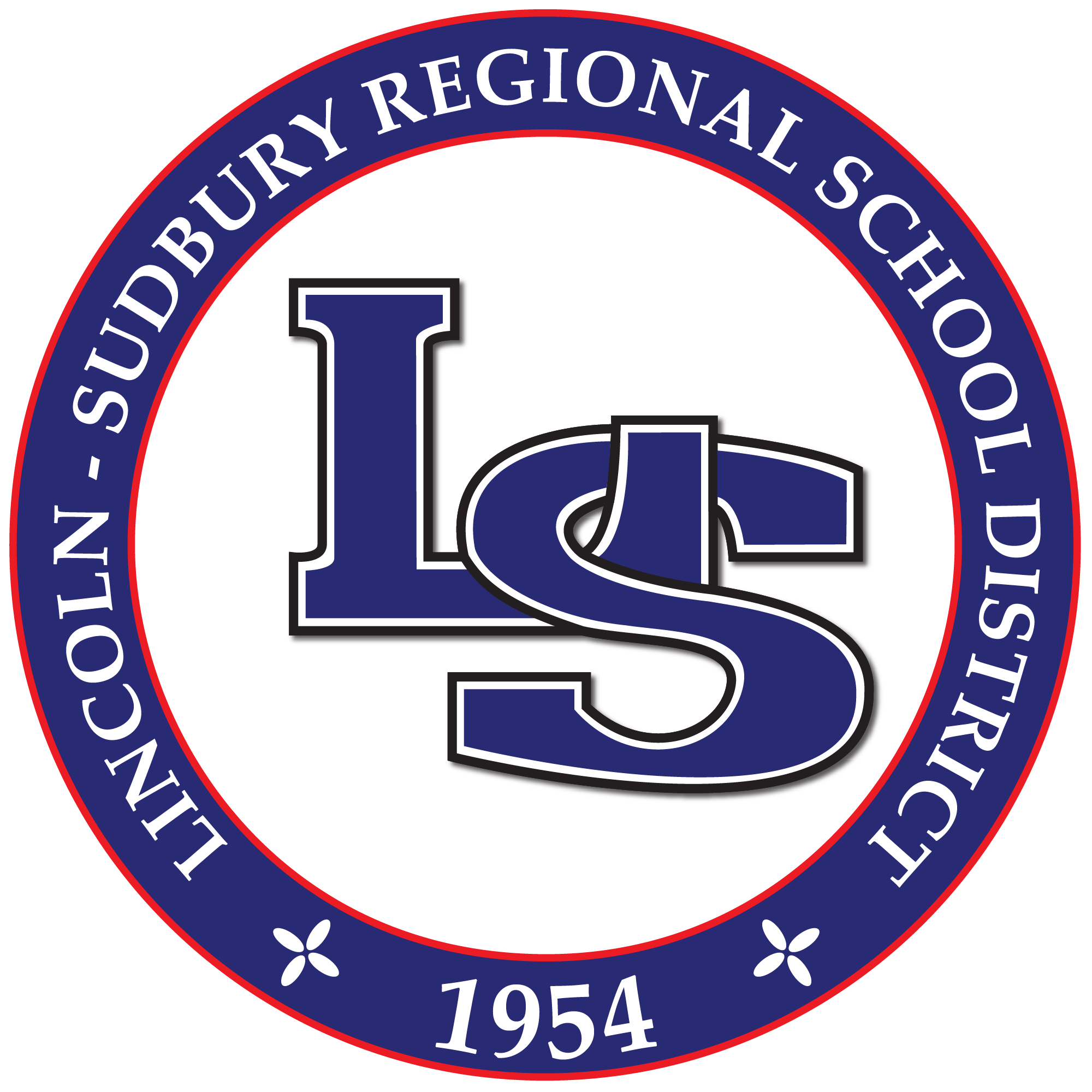
- Lincoln-Sudbury Regional High School logo

Location
- 390 Lincoln Road; Sudbury, Massachusetts 01776; United States; 42.3976°N 71.4003°W

Information
- Type: Public
- Motto: Think for yourself, but think of others
- Established: 1954
- School district: Lincoln-Sudbury Regional School District
- CEEB code: 222088
- Superintendent/Principal: Andrew Stephens
- Teaching staff: 128.74 (FTE)
- Grades: 9–12
- Gender: Coeducational
- Enrollment: 1,462 (2023–2024)
- Student to teacher ratio: 11.36
- Campus type: Suburban
- Colors: Navy and white
- Athletics conference: Dual County League
- Nickname: Warriors
- Accreditation: NEASC
- Newspaper: The Forum
- Budget: $31,497,691 total $19,282 per pupil (2016)
- Communities served: Lincoln, Sudbury
- Website: www.lsrhs.net

Lincoln-Sudbury Regional High School (LSRHS or LS) is a public regional high school in Sudbury, Massachusetts, United States. The school was founded in 1954, and the building was replaced prior to the 2004–2005 academic year, with additional facilities added in subsequent years.

The school takes residents of Hanscom Air Force Base who are not dependents of active duty military personnel. Dependents of active duty military personnel living on base are instead sent to Bedford High School.

== History ==
The Lincoln-Sudbury Regional School District was established in 1954, integrating the former Sudbury High School with students from the nearby town of Lincoln, Massachusetts. Lincoln did not have its own high school previously, electing to send its students to neighboring towns' schools.

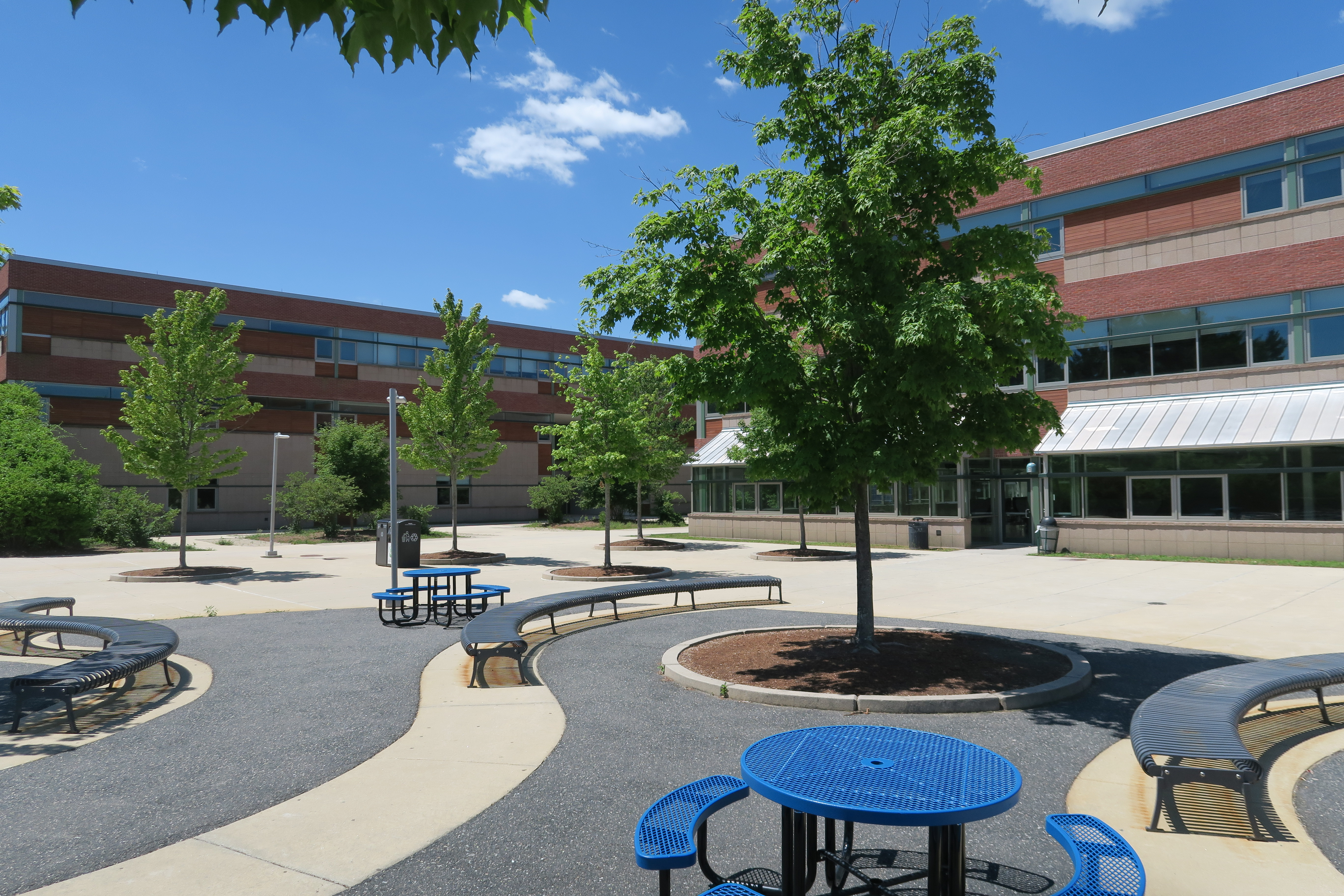
High school courtyard in 2016

In June 2002, the district launched a $74 million project to replace aging facilities with new construction on the same campus. The new school was completed before the 2004–2005 academic year, and the old building was demolished. The updated facilities include four gymnasiums and a 750-seat auditorium. A $1.6 million project to install a completely refurbished sports stadium, including a multipurpose turf field, 6-lane running track, and bleachers, culminated in the fall of 2007. In the summer of 2016, a multi thousand budget was put in place and the track and the fields were refurbished.

The school has received high ratings in the U.S. News & World Report listings of the best public high schools in America, in 2019 ranking #1,554 out of 17,000 nationally and #70 in the Commonwealth of Massachusetts. L-S has a graduation rate of 99%, compared to 96.2% across the state.

Some controversial events have occurred over the years, including a stabbing death of one student by another in 2007 and sexual assault allegations in 2013.

== Athletics ==
Lincoln-Sudbury is a member of the Dual County League. The varsity teams were a combined 295-98-9 in 2006–2007, earning the school the Dalton Trophy, awarded by The Boston Globe for the best overall won-loss record among Division I Massachusetts high schools. It was the school's first Dalton Trophy win since moving to Division I, after previously winning the Division II trophy eight times between 1975 and 2003.

Fall sports include football, field hockey (co-ed), girls' volleyball, soccer, cross country, and golf. Winter sports include basketball, skiing, wrestling, Boys and Girls ice hockey, swimming/diving, Spring sports include, Boys and Girls lacrosse, baseball, softball, tennis, and boys' volleyball. Track and field is offered during both winter and spring.

Club teams are also offered, such as ultimate frisbee and sailing.

Before the 2017 season, Lincoln-Sudbury named both the boys and girls rugby clubs as varsity sports. In 2006, Lincoln-Sudbury Women's Rugby Football Club became the first established high school girls' rugby team in Massachusetts.

On Thanksgiving morning, L-S plays Newton South High School.

The boys' lacrosse team won the 2015, 2016, 2017, and 2019 MIAA Division 1 state titles. They finished the 2017 season with a #9 national ranking.

== Music ==
Lincoln-Sudbury's music curriculum includes major and select instrumental ensembles, jazz ensembles, and choral ensembles. There are two large bands, a string orchestra, two big band jazz ensembles and two jazz combos for instrumental music, along a concert choir, chamber singing group and multiple a cappella groups for choral music. The groups present numerous concerts throughout the school year and both instrumental and choral groups participate in state and national competitions. Students interested in large ensemble but unable to participate during school hours may join Civic Orchestra, where students and adults in the community practice and perform together. The 1971 Lincoln-Sudbury Select Chorus performed as the chorus in "Carmen" for the Boston Symphony conducted by Leonard Bernstein. In 2008, the chorus was invited to sing John Rutter's "Gloria" at Carnegie Hall.

There are also various A cappella and student led groups. Accent is the school's only co-ed group and has recorded several albums. Other groups include the Acafellas, a tenor and bass a cappella group founded in 2009, Achoired Taste and Musigals, both of which are soprano and alto a cappella groups, and Coro de Chicas, a soprano alto accompanied group.

== Languages ==
Lincoln-Sudbury offers instruction in French, German, Spanish, Latin, and Mandarin Chinese. Additionally, Lincoln-Sudbury takes part in French, German, and Spanish exchanges that occur (generally) bi-annually. The language department also has French, Latin, German, and Spanish clubs that promote their respective language through organized activities.

== Theater arts ==
Lincoln-Sudbury is known for performing material above high school level, including performances of musical-Shakespeare productions. Carly Evans directs. In the fall of 2013, the LSB players performed Les Misérables. In the winter of 2013, the LSB players performed The Big Eleven and Removing the Glove. In May The 39 Steps was performed, followed by Collage, a mix of student-written short scenes. In the fall of 2014, LSB players performed Chicago. In the fall of 2015, they performed the musical Wonderful Town, based on the movie My Sister Eileen. In the spring of 2016, they performed Mary Zimmerman's The Secret in the Wings. Musicals are accompanied by a live orchestra composed of students and conducted by the school's instrumental director, Thomas Grandprey. In 2016, the L-S musical was How to Succeed in Business Without Really Trying. This was followed in the winter by the first student-directed Winter One-Acts and a theatre-for-young audiences production in the spring.

== Wellness Department ==
In April 2010, the department received an Excellence in Education Award for its programming, and outreach to the Lincoln Sudbury communities.

Students take 12 quarters of Wellness credit, including six core quarter classes.

== Special interests ==
In 1982, under the guidance of computer education teacher Brian Harvey, students at the school created the computer game Hack, based on their desire to re-create their experience playing a similar game, Rogue. Because the students decided to make the source code to their game publicly and freely available, this became something of a seminal moment in the history of both roguelike games and the open source software movement. Other developers, interested in building on and improving Hack, used the source code created by the Lincoln-Sudbury students to develop what became NetHack, a highly complex and somewhat popular game that is still played and developed today. Furthermore, because the source code contained a note saying, effectively, that others were free to modify it so long as any derivative code was similarly free and open, it introduced many people to the idea of a "public license", which has since evolved into such modern derivatives as the LGPL.

The Lincoln-Sudbury Speech and Debate team was established in 2003. The team participates in the Massachusetts Forensic League division of the National Catholic Forensic League, as well as the National Forensic League.

== Notable alumni ==
- Lynne Berry '90, children's author
- Linda Chorney '78, musician, Grammy nominee
- Holly Clarke '09, distance runner
- Mike Croel '87, NFL linebacker
- Peter Cunningham '65, photographer
- Chris Evans '99, film actor
- Scott Evans '02, TV actor
- John Flansburgh '78, co-founder of the band They Might Be Giants
- Diana Golden '80, gold medal in disabled skiing at the 1988 Winter Olympics
- Mike Gordon, bassist from the band Phish
- Maggie Hassan '76, U.S. senator and former governor of New Hampshire
- Robert Kirshner, astrophysicist and author
- John Linnell '77, co-founder of the band They Might Be Giants
- Mark Mangini '74, two-time Oscar winning Sound Designer
- Paula Poundstone '77 (did not graduate), comedian, longtime panelist of Wait Wait... Don't Tell Me!
- Ashley Richardson '82, supermodel
- Simon Shnapir '05, 2014 Sochi Olympic medalist in pair skating
- Jarrod Shoemaker, '00, triathlete
- Jenna Shoemaker, '02, triathlete
- Joe Sims, NFL tackle/guard
- Jeremy Strong '97, actor, Emmy winner
- Carolyn Swords '07, WNBA player
- Callie Thorne '87, TV actress
