= Rafael Durán =

Rafael Durán may refer to:

- Rafael Durán (actor) (1911–1994), Spanish actor
- Rafael Duran (wrestler) (born 1983), Venezuelan wrestler
- Rafael Durán (footballer) (born 1997), Mexican footballer
- Rafael Durán (racing driver) (born 2006), Spanish and American racing driver
