= Tony Ries =

Tony Ries may refer to:

- Tony Ries Sr. (1913-1989), South African Olympic wrestler
- Tony Ries Jr. (born 1939), South African Olympic wrestler, son of the above
