= Mário Silva =

Mário Silva may refer to:

- Mário Silva (footballer) (born 1977), Portuguese footballer
- Mário Silva (athlete) (born 1961), Portuguese middle-distance runner
- Mário Silva (cyclist) (1939–2023), Portuguese Olympic cyclist
- Mario Silva (politician) (born 1966), Canadian politician
- Mario De Silva (1935–2025), Italian Olympic wrestler
- Mario Silva, host of La Hojilla, an opinion program that airs on Venezolana de Televisión
