= Cuba at the 1960 Summer Olympics =

- IOC code: CUB
- NOC: Cuban Olympic Committee

in Rome
- Competitors: 12 (9 men and 3 women) in 8 sports
- Flag bearer: José Yañez
- Medals: Gold 0 Silver 0 Bronze 0 Total 0

Summer Olympics appearances (overview)
- 1900; 1904; 1908–1920; 1924; 1928; 1932–1936; 1948; 1952; 1956; 1960; 1964; 1968; 1972; 1976; 1980; 1984–1988; 1992; 1996; 2000; 2004; 2008; 2012; 2016; 2020; 2024

Cuba competed at the 1960 Summer Olympics in Rome, Italy. 12 competitors, 9 men and 3 women, took part in 15 events in 8 sports.

== Fencing ==
One fencer represented Cuba in 1960.

Men's épée

- Abelardo Menéndez

== Swimming ==
Men

| Athlete | Event | Heat | | Semifinal | | Final | |
| Athlete | Event | Time | Rank | Time | Rank | Time | Rank |
|---|---|---|---|---|---|---|---|
| Rubén Roca | 100 m freestyle | 58.3 | =25 | Did not advance | | | |
| Rubén Roca | 400 m freestyle | 4:41.3 | 23 | —N/a | | Did not advance | |
