= Alimbeg Bestaev =

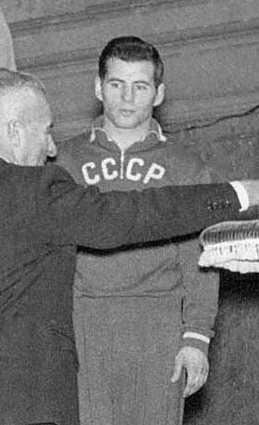
- Bestaev at the 1956 Olympics

Personal information
- Born: 15 August 1936 Tskhinvali, Georgian SSR, Soviet Union
- Died: 1988 (aged 51–52) Moscow, Russia

Sport
- Sport: Freestyle wrestling
Medal record
Representing the Soviet Union
Olympic Games
Bronze medal – third place	1956 Melbourne	67 kg
World Championships
Gold medal – first place	1957 Istanbul	67 kg
World Cup
Gold medal – first place	1956 Istanbul	67 kg

Alimbeg Borisovich Bestaev (Russian: Алимбег Борисович Бестаев, 15 August 1936 – 1988) was a Soviet lightweight freestyle wrestler. He won the world title in 1957 and an Olympic bronze medal in 1956. He also won the 1956 World Cup, pinning all five of his opponents within 20 minutes of each other's overall time spent on the mat and winning the outstanding wrestler award of the tournament, regardless of style or weight class.

Bestaev was born in South Ossetia and first trained in the Georgian style of wrestling, chidaoba. He took up traditional wrestling in 1951 when his family moved to Vladikavkaz. He won his only Soviet title in 1955 and placed second in 1956. In 1956, he won the World Cup and was selected for the 1956 Olympics. At the Olympics, he won his first three bouts by fall but then lost to Gyula Tóth and Emam-Ali Habibi. He retired after placing second at the 1962 Soviet Championships to become a wrestling coach in Moscow.
