= David Schumacher =

David Schumacher may refer to:

- David Schumacher (producer) (born 1969), American film and television producer and musician
- David Schumacher (wrestler) (1931–2022), Australian wrestler
- David Schumacher (racing driver) (born 2001), German racing driver
