= Wrestling at the 1962 Asian Games – Men's freestyle 70 kg =

Men's freestyle 70 kg at the 1962 Asian Games
- Venue: Ikada Sports Hall
- Dates: 28–30 August 1962
- Competitors: 7 from 7 nations

Medalists
gold medal	Kazuo Abe	Japan
silver medal	Udey Chand	India
bronze medal	Ghulam Rasool	Pakistan

The men's freestyle 70 kilograms (lightweight) freestyle wrestling competition at the 1962 Asian Games in Jakarta was held from 28 to 30 August 1962.

The competition used a form of negative points tournament, with negative points given for any result short of a fall. Accumulation of 6 negative points eliminated the wrestler. When three or fewer wrestlers remained, they advanced to a final round, with only preliminary results amongst them carried forward.

== Schedule ==
All times are Western Indonesian Time (UTC+07:30)

Date	Time	Event
Tuesday, 28 August 1962	08:00	1st round
Wednesday, 29 August 1962	08:00	2nd round
Wednesday, 29 August 1962	14:30	3rd round
Thursday, 30 August 1962	08:00	4th round
Thursday, 30 August 1962	14:30	5th round

== Results ==
=== 1st round ===
TBM		BM		BM		TBM
0	Udey Chand (IND)	0	Fall 0:14	4	Glicerio Tronco (PHI)	4
3	Robby Nainggolan (INA)	3	Decision	1	Abdul Wahab (AFG)	1
3	Ghulam Rasool (PAK)	3	Decision	1	Kazuo Abe (JPN)	1
0	Bong Chang-won (KOR)				Bye	

=== 2nd round ===
TBM		BM		BM		TBM
4	Bong Chang-won (KOR)	4	Fall 8:57	0	Udey Chand (IND)	0
8	Glicerio Tronco (PHI)	4	Walkover	0	Robby Nainggolan (INA)	3
4	Abdul Wahab (AFG)	3	Decision	1	Ghulam Rasool (PAK)	4
1	Kazuo Abe (JPN)				Bye	

=== 3rd round ===
TBM		BM		BM		TBM
2	Kazuo Abe (JPN)	1	Decision	3	Bong Chang-won (KOR)	7
1	Udey Chand (IND)	1	Decision	3	Abdul Wahab (AFG)	7
7	Robby Nainggolan (INA)	4	Fall 1:04	0	Ghulam Rasool (PAK)	4

=== 4th round ===
TBM		BM		BM		TBM
3	Kazuo Abe (JPN)	1	Decision	3	Udey Chand (IND)	4
4	Ghulam Rasool (PAK)				Bye	

=== 5th round ===
TBM		BM		BM		TBM
8	Ghulam Rasool (PAK)	4	Fall 1:37	0	Udey Chand (IND)	4
3	Kazuo Abe (JPN)				Bye	

== Final standing ==
Rank	Athlete	Round					TBM	FBM
Rank	Athlete	1	2	3	4	5	TBM	FBM
1st place, gold medalist(s)	Kazuo Abe (JPN)	1	Bye	1	1	Bye	3	2
2nd place, silver medalist(s)	Udey Chand (IND)	0	0	1	3	0	4	3
3rd place, bronze medalist(s)	Ghulam Rasool (PAK)	3	1	0	Bye	4	8	7
4	Robby Nainggolan (INA)	3	0	4			7	
5	Abdul Wahab (AFG)	1	3	3			7	
6	Bong Chang-won (KOR)	Bye	4	3			7	
7	Glicerio Tronco (PHI)	4	4				8	
