= Piek =

Piek can refer to:

- Fer, French wine grape variety. Known under the synonym Piek
- Piek (name), masculine given name and surname

== See also ==
- Pike (disambiguation)
