= Wrestling at the 1958 Asian Games – Men's freestyle 73 kg =

Men's freestyle 73 kg at the 1958 Asian Games
- Venue: Korakuen Ice Palace
- Dates: 25–27 May 1958
- Competitors: 7 from 7 nations

Medalists
gold medal	Yutaka Kaneko	Japan
silver medal	Tofigh Jahanbakht	Iran
bronze medal	Muhammad Bashir	Pakistan

The men's freestyle 73 kilograms (welterweight) freestyle wrestling competition at the 1958 Asian Games in Tokyo was held from 25 to 27 May 1958.

The competition used a form of negative points tournament, with negative points given for any result short of a fall. Accumulation of 6 negative points eliminated the wrestler. When three wrestlers remained, they advanced to a final round. These 3 wrestlers each faced each other in a round-robin (with earlier results counting, if any had wrestled another before); record within the medal round determined medals, with bad points breaking ties.

== Schedule ==
All times are Japan Standard Time (UTC+09:00)

Date	Time	Event
Sunday, 25 May 1958	11:00	First round
Monday, 26 May 1958	10:00	Second round
Monday, 26 May 1958	19:00	Third round
Tuesday, 27 May 1958	10:00	Fourth round
Tuesday, 27 May 1958	19:00	Fifth round

== Results ==
=== First round ===
TBM		BM		BM		TBM
0	Tofigh Jahanbakht (IRN)	0	Fall 11:49	4	Choi Myong-jong (KOR)	4
0	Amir Jan Khalunder (AFG)	0	Fall 0:26	4	Yip Kah Pak (MAL)	4
0	Muhammad Bashir (PAK)	0	Fall 0:40	4	Leonides Viajar (PHI)	4
0	Yutaka Kaneko (JPN)				Bye	

=== Second round ===
TBM		BM		BM		TBM
2	Yutaka Kaneko (JPN)	2	Draw	2	Tofigh Jahanbakht (IRN)	2
4	Choi Myong-jong (KOR)	0	Fall 2:35	4	Amir Jan Khalunder (AFG)	4
8	Yip Kah Pak (MAL)	4	Fall 0:49	0	Muhammad Bashir (PAK)	0
4	Leonides Viajar (PHI)				Bye	

=== Third round ===
TBM		BM		BM		TBM
8	Leonides Viajar (PHI)	4	Fall 1:54	0	Yutaka Kaneko (JPN)	2
2	Tofigh Jahanbakht (IRN)				Bye	
8	Choi Myong-jong (KOR)	4	Fall 1:22	0	Muhammad Bashir (PAK)	0

- Amir Jan Khalunder (AFG) withdrew.

=== Fourth round ===
TBM		BM		BM		TBM
3	Tofigh Jahanbakht (IRN)	1	Decision	3	Muhammad Bashir (PAK)	3
2	Yutaka Kaneko (JPN)				Bye	

=== Fifth round ===
TBM		BM		BM		TBM
3	Yutaka Kaneko (JPN)	1	Decision	3	Muhammad Bashir (PAK)	6
3	Tofigh Jahanbakht (IRN)				Bye	

== Final standing ==
Rank	Athlete	Round					TBM	FBM
Rank	Athlete	1	2	3	4	5	TBM	FBM
1st place, gold medalist(s)	Yutaka Kaneko (JPN)	Bye	2	0	Bye	1	3	3 (Note: Tied on head-to-head result and total bad marks. The athletes' body weights were used as the tiebreaker.)
2nd place, silver medalist(s)	Tofigh Jahanbakht (IRN)	0	2	Bye	1	Bye	3	3
3rd place, bronze medalist(s)	Muhammad Bashir (PAK)	0	0	0	3	3	6	6
4	Choi Myong-jong (KOR)	4	0	4			8	
5	Leonides Viajar (PHI)	4	Bye	4			8	
6	Amir Jan Khalunder (AFG)	0	4				4	
7	Yip Kah Pak (MAL)	4	4				8	
