= Lynne Berry =

American writer

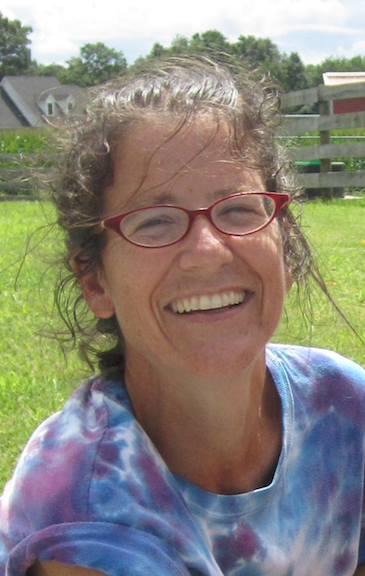
- Lynne Berry
- Born: 1972 (age 53–54); Boston, Massachusetts, U.S.
- Education: Wellesley College (BA); Vanderbilt University (PhD)
- Occupations: Writer, Editor
- Writing career
- Language: English
- Period: 2002 – present
- Genres: Children's literature
- Notable works: Duck Skates; The Curious Demise of a Contrary Cat; What Floats in a Moat

Lynne Berry (born 1972) is an American writer of children's books, including the picture books Duck Skates from the Duck series, The Curious Demise of a Contrary Cat, and What Floats in a Moat.

== Biography ==
Berry grew up in Sudbury, Massachusetts and attended Lincoln-Sudbury Regional High School, where she won the Frank Heys Memorial Award that recognizes "genuine intellectual curiosity and accomplishment, dedication to the fine and applied arts, and a caring belief in people."

She then spent two years at Stanford University and two years at Wellesley College, graduating with a Bachelor of Arts in Biology in 1994. Berry received a PhD in Cell Biology from Vanderbilt University in 1997.

In the early 2000s, Berry had several short poems published in Ladybug magazine. In October 2005, her first picture book, Duck Skates was published by Henry Holt and Company through their Holt Books for Young Readers imprint. Duck Skates, illustrated by Hiroe Nakata, is the first of what is currently a 4-book series.

In 2006, Simon & Schuster published The Curious Demise of a Contrary Cat, illustrated by Luke LaMarca. Simon & Schuster has since published What Floats in a Moat – illustrated by Matthew Cordell – in 2013 and has Berry's Pig and Pug – illustrated by Gemma Correll – in development for publication in June 2015.

== Published works ==
- Duck Skates (Henry Holt and Company Books for Young Readers, 2005)
- The Curious Demise of a Contrary Cat (Simon & Schuster Books for Young Readers, 2006)

A Kirkus Reviews Starred review

- Duck Dunks (Henry Holt and Company Books for Young Readers, 2008)
- Duck Tents (Henry Holt and Company Books for Young Readers, 2009)
- Ducking for Apples (Henry Holt and Company Books for Young Readers, 2010)
- What Floats in a Moat? (Simon & Schuster Books for Young Readers, 2013)

A Publishers Weekly Starred review

- Squid Kid the Magnificent (Disney Hyperion, 2015)
- Pig and Pug (Simon & Schuster Books for Young Readers, 2015)

A Kirkus Reviews Starred review
