= Hernando Delgado =

Spanish wrestler (born 1937)

Personal information
- Nationality: Spanish
- Born: 5 November 1937 (age 88) Madrid, Spain

Sport
- Sport: Wrestling

Hernando Delgado (born 5 November 1937) is a Spanish wrestler. He competed in the men's Greco-Roman lightweight at the 1960 Summer Olympics.
