= Horst Bergmann =

German wrestler

Personal information
- Nationality: German
- Born: 24 November 1937 Nowa Sól, Poland
- Died: 10 September 2016 (aged 78)

Sport
- Sport: Wrestling

Horst Bergmann (24 November 1937 – 10 September 2016) was a German wrestler. He competed in the men's freestyle lightweight at the 1960 Summer Olympics.
