= Vladimir Rosin =

Soviet wrestler

Personal information
- Nationality: Soviet
- Born: 11 April 1932 (age 94)

Sport
- Sport: Wrestling
Medal record
Representing the Soviet Union
World Cup
| Gold medal – first place | 1956 Istanbul | -67 kg |

Vladimir Rosin (born 11 April 1932) is a Soviet wrestler. He competed in the men's Greco-Roman lightweight at the 1956 Summer Olympics.
