= Parkash Gian =

Indian wrestler

Personal information
- Nationality: Indian
- Born: 16 June 1937 (age 89) Delhi, India

Sport
- Sport: Wrestling

Parkash Gian (born 19 June 1937) is an Indian wrestler. He competed in the men's freestyle lightweight at the 1960 Summer Olympics.
