= Karel Matoušek =

Czech wrestler (1928–2018)

Personal information
- Nationality: Czech
- Born: 10 May 1928 Prague, Czechoslovakia
- Died: 1 January 2018 (aged 89)

Sport
- Sport: Wrestling

Karel Matoušek (10 May 1928 – 1 January 2018) a Czech wrestler. He competed in the men's Greco-Roman lightweight at the 1960 Summer Olympics.
