= Martti Peltoniemi =

Finnish wrestler

Personal information
- Nationality: Finnish
- Born: 16 June 1935 Lappajärvi, Finland
- Died: 2 August 1975 (aged 40) Helsinki, Finland

Sport
- Sport: Wrestling

Martti Peltoniemi (16 June 1935 – 2 August 1975) was a Finnish wrestler. He competed in the men's freestyle lightweight at the 1960 Summer Olympics.
