= Piek (name) =

Piek can be both a masculine given name and a surname. Notable people with the name include:

- Piek Vossen (fl. 1995–present), professor at VU Amsterdam
- Christin Piek (1889–????), Belgian tug of war competitor
- Elisa Piek (born 1993), Dutch badminton player
- Leo Piek (1927–2013), Dutch wrestler
- Selena Piek (born 1991), Dutch badminton player
