= 1956 Wrestling World Cup =

- Host city: Istanbul, Turkey
- Dates: 25–31 May
- Stadium: Mithatpaşa Stadium

Champions
- Freestyle: 8
- Greco-Roman: 8

The 1956 Wrestling World Cup was held on May 25–31 in Istanbul, Turkey, at the Mithatpaşa Stadium, under the auspices of FILA. The attendance of the event was around 20 thousand spectators at the stadium. Freestyle wrestling competition was held from May 25 to May 27, 61 wrestlers from 12 countries participated in the freestyle event. Greco-Roman wrestling competition was held from May 29 to May 31, 89 wrestlers from 16 countries participated in the Greco-Roman event. The team victory in the freestyle event was won by the Turkish National Team, which scored 44 points out of 48 possible, followed by the USSR National Team. The team victory in the Greco-Roman event was won by the USSR team, which scored 39 points. The overall team victory was won by the Soviet Union, therefore the USSR National Team won the World Cup.

== Participating teams ==
The competition was attended by teams of the following states and independent territories: Austria, Belgium, Bulgaria, Egypt, Finland, France, West Germany, Hungary, Iran, Italy, Japan, Lebanon, Netherlands, Pakistan, Poland, Romania, Saarland, Soviet Union, Switzerland, Syria, Turkey, United Arab Emirates, United Kingdom, Yemen, Yugoslavia. The United States didn't have a team in competition.

== Medal summary ==
=== Men's freestyle ===
| Event | Gold | Silver | Bronze |
|---|---|---|---|
| Flyweight; 52 kg | Hüseyin Akbaş; Turkey | Mirian Tsalkalamanidze; Soviet Union | Kazuo Dzida; Japan |
| Bantamweight; 57 kg | Mustafa Dağıstanlı; Turkey | Bayram Giannini; Iran | Minoru Iizuka; Japan |
| Featherweight; 62 kg | Shozo Sasahara; Japan | Linar Salimullin; Soviet Union | Bayram Şit; Turkey |
| Lightweight; 67 kg | Alimbeg Bestayev; Soviet Union | Georgy Zaichev; Bulgaria | Hayrullah Şahin; Turkey |
| Welterweight; 73 kg | İbrahim Zengin; Turkey | Said Murtazov; Bulgaria | Hans Sommer; Germany |
| Middleweight; 79 kg | İsmet Atlı; Turkey | Nikola Stanchev; Bulgaria | Kazuo Katsuramoto; Japan |
| Light heavyweight 87 kg | Adil Atan; Turkey | Boris Kulayev; Soviet Union | Hossein Nuri; Iran |
| Heavyweight +87 kg | Hamit Kaplan; Turkey | Arsen Mekokishvili; Soviet Union | Husein Mehmedov; Bulgaria |

=== Men's Greco-Roman ===
| Event | Gold | Silver | Bronze |
|---|---|---|---|
| Flyweight; 52 kg | Dursun Ali Erbaş; Turkey | Istvan Barani; Hungary | Simon; Saar |
| Bantamweight; 57 kg | Yaşar Yılmaz; Turkey | Dinko Petrov; Bulgaria | Francisc Horvath; Romania |
| Featherweight; 62 kg | Vladimir Stashkevich; Soviet Union | Osman Kambur; Turkey | Imre Polyák; Hungary |
| Lightweight; 67 kg | Vladimir Rosin; Soviet Union | Kyösti Lehtonen; Finland | Rıza Doğan; Turkey |
| Welterweight; 73 kg | Vladimir Maneev; Soviet Union | Mithat Bayrak; Turkey | Veikko Rantanen; Finland |
| Middleweight; 79 kg | Givi Kartozia; Soviet Union | Branislav Simić; Yugoslavia | Horst Hess; West Germany |
| Light heavyweight 87 kg | Arkady Tkachev; Soviet Union | Petko Sirakov; Bulgaria | Gyula Kovács; Hungary |
| Heavyweight +87 kg | Johannes Kotkas; Soviet Union | Hamit Kaplan; Turkey | Husein Mehmedov; Bulgaria |

== Outstanding Wrestler of the tournament ==
- Alimbeg Bestayev (Soviet Union)

== Sources ==
=== News ===
- Straits Times (May 28, 1956). "Turks dominate world wrestling tourney". The Straits Times: 11.
- Associated Press (June 2, 1956). "Russia Wins Mat Title". Pacific Stars and Stripes: 22.
- Sports Illustrated (November 19, 1956). "Mixed Bag of Medals: Wrestling". Sports Illustrated. 5 (21): 90.
- Associated Press (May 28, 1956). "Turkish Matmen Win: Istanbul, May 27". Wilmington Morning News: 26.
- Associated Press (May 28, 1956). "World Wrestling Test". Rochester Democrat and Chronicle: 22.
- "Turkey Wins". Courier-Journal. Louisville, Kentucky: 8. May 28, 1956.
- "Wrestling: World Cup Meeting in Istanbul (May 29-31)". Soviet Sports Handbook. London: Soviet News: 13, 15. 1957.
- "Sports—World & International: World Cup Wrestling Tournament". Current Affairs. Delhi: A. Mukherjee & Co., Private Ltd.: 229 1957.
