= Schumaker =

Schumaker is a surname. Notable people with the surname include:

- John G. Schumaker (1826–1905), United States Representative from New York
- Robert P. Schumaker, American academic and inventor of AZFinText
- Skip Schumaker (born 1980), American baseball player and manager
