= Tony Schumacher =

Tony Schumacher may refer to:

- Tony Schumacher (drag racer) (born 1969), American drag racer
- Tony Schumacher (canoeist) (born 1976), Australian sprint canoeist
- Tony Schumacher (German author) (1848–1931), German children books author
- Tony Schumacher (English author) (born 1967), English author, screenwriter, and broadcaster

== See also ==
- Toni Schumacher (born 1954), German football goalkeeper from 1972 through 1992
- Anton Schumacher (born 1938), German football goalkeeper from 1960 through 1968
