= Mitsuharu Kitamura =

Japanese wrestler

Personal information
- Nationality: Japanese
- Born: 2 October 1934 Mashike, Hokkaido, Japan
- Died: 2006 (aged 71–72)

Sport
- Sport: Wrestling

Mitsuharu Kitamura (2 October 1934 – 2006) was a Japanese wrestler. He competed in the men's Greco-Roman lightweight at the 1960 Summer Olympics.
