= Shelby Wilson =

American wrestler (born 1937)

Personal information
- Full name: Shelby Autrie Wilson
- Born: July 14, 1937 (age 89) Ponca City, Oklahoma, U.S.

Sport
- Country: United States
- Sport: Wrestling
- Events: Freestyle and Folkstyle
- College team: Oklahoma State
- Team: USA
- Coached by: Myron Roderick
Medal record
Men's freestyle wrestling
Representing the United States
Olympic Games
Gold medal – first place	1960 Rome	67 kg
Collegiate Wrestling
Representing the Oklahoma State Cowboys
NCAA Championships
Silver medal – second place	1958 Laramie	137 lb
Silver medal – second place	1959 Iowa City	137 lb

Shelby Autrie Wilson (born July 14, 1937) is an American wrestler and Olympic champion from Ponca City, Oklahoma. He won a gold medal in wrestling at the 1960 Summer Olympics in Rome, Italy.

== Career ==
Wilson was born in Ponca City, Oklahoma, As a child, he worked on the family farm. Wilson started wrestling in junior high after being assigned to wrestling by his physical education teacher, despite Wilson never having heard of the sport at the time. Wilson was a two-time Oklahoma state tournament runner-up while in high school, and was a two-time NCAA runner-up in college at Oklahoma State after being given a full wrestling scholarship to attend. He once injured his ankle but after being denied a hardship ruling by the National Collegiate Athletic Association, he came back and only lost 3 matches in his college career, with all 3 coming in state finals.

His journey to the 1960 Olympics began with a second place finish at a qualifying tournament, to earn a spot in the training camp. Wilson would defeat the challengers below him and then beat the top-ranked wrestler to earn his spot on the USA freestyle team. He would win Olympic gold in Rome at the 1960 Olympics, in the 67 kg division. This was the first and only major wrestling tournament that Wilson won.

Wilson appeared as a contestant on the CBS television program, I've Got a Secret, on the September 14, 1960 episode. His secret was, "Both of us won Gold Medals in the Olympics last week (Wrestling)"

In 1982, Wilson was inducted into the National Wrestling Hall of Fame as a Distinguished Member. In 2023, he was inducted into the Oklahoma State University Hall of Honor.
