= Nazem Amine =

Lebanese wrestler

- Amine (right) with his wife, Nadia, in 1967

Personal information
- Nationality: Lebanese
- Born: 29 May 1927 Zahlé, Lebanon
- Died: 16 July 2017 (aged 90)

Sport
- Sport: Wrestling

Nazem Amine (29 May 1927 – 16 July 2017) was a Lebanese wrestler. He competed in the men's freestyle lightweight competition at the 1960 Summer Olympics.

Amine was born in 1927 in Haouch El-Omara, a suburb of Zahlé in Lebanon. Amine was one of nine children and took up wrestling at the age of 16. After the outbreak of the Six-Day War, Nazem moved his family of five children to Detroit, Michigan, United States. In Detroit, he worked as a butcher and as a baggage handler for Spirit Airlines. He died at age 90 on 16 July 2017.

Two of Amine's sons, Mike and Sam, attended the University of Michigan and wrestled for the Michigan Wolverines. Amine's grandson, Myles Amine, won bronze at the 2020 Summer Olympics in the men's freestyle wrestling 86 kg competition for San Marino.
