= Rıza Doğan =

Turkish Greco-Roman wrestler

Medal record

Representing Turkey

Men's Greco-Roman wrestling

Olympic Games
Silver medal – second place	1956 Melbourne	67 kg

World Championships
Bronze medal – third place	1962 Toledo	63 kg

World Cup
Bronze medal – third place	1956 Istanbul	67 kg

Mediterranean Games
Gold medal – first place	1959 Beirut	67 kg
Gold medal – first place	1955 Barcelone	63 kg

Olympic medal record

Men's Freestyle Wrestling

Representing Turkey

Mediterranean Games
Gold medal – first place	1959 Beirut	67 kg

Rıza Doğan (1931 – 21 April 2004) was a Turkish wrestler. He was born in Ankara. He won a silver medal in the lightweight division at the 1956 Summer Olympics in Melbourne.
