= Anastasios Mousidis =

Greek wrestler (1934–2010)

Personal information
- Nationality: Greek
- Born: 29 September 1934 Athens, Greece
- Died: 28 July 2010 (aged 75)

Sport
- Sport: Wrestling

Anastasios Mousidis (29 September 1934 – 28 July 2010) was a Greek wrestler. He competed in the men's Greco-Roman lightweight at the 1960 Summer Olympics. Mousidis died on 28 July 2010, at the age of 75.
