= Avtandil Koridze =

Georgian wrestler (1935–1966)

Personal information
- Born: 15 April 1935 Tbilisi, Georgian SSR, Soviet Union
- Died: 11 April 1966 (aged 30) Terjola, Imereti, Georgian SSR, Soviet Union

Sport
- Sport: Greco-Roman wrestling
- Club: Burevestnik Tbilisi
Medal record
Men's Greco-Roman wrestling
Representing the Soviet Union
Olympic Games
Gold medal – first place	1960 Rome	67 kg
World Championships
Gold medal – first place	1961 Yokohama	67 kg

Avtandil Georgievich Koridze (Georgian: ავთანდილ ქორიძე; 15 April 1935 – 11 April 1966) was a lightweight Greco-Roman wrestler from Georgia who won an Olympic gold medal in 1960 and a world title in 1961. He never won a Soviet title, placing second in 1957 and 1960 and third in 1958.

Koridze took up wrestling in 1949 and in 1957 was included to the Soviet national team. He retired in 1961 and died five years later in a car crash, together with a fellow Olympic wrestler Roman Dzeneladze.
