= Jack Taylor (British wrestler) =

British wrestler

Personal information
- Nationality: British (English)
- Born: 7 March 1932 Bradford, England
- Died: 7 October 2015 (aged 83) Bradford, England

Sport
- Sport: Amateur wrestling
- Club: Windmill Club, Bradford

Jack Taylor (7 March 1932 – 7 October 2015) was a British wrestler who competed at the 1956 Summer Olympics.

== Biography ==
Taylor was born into a famous wrestling family, his father Tom Taylor was the 1938 British featherweight champion and his uncle Joe Taylor was a four-times British featherweight champion and competed at the 1932 Summer Olympics.

Jack wa coached by his father and became a British champion himself, after winning the 1956 lightweight title at the British Wrestling Championships and later that year reprersnted Great Britain at the 1956 Olympic Games in Melbourne, Australia, where he participated in the men's freestyle lightweight event.

Jack's brother Barry Taylor was the Yorkshire champion and cousin Eric Taylor was champion of the North. His nephew Dave Taylor also competed in the sport but as a professional wrestler.
