= Väinö Hakkarainen =

Finnish wrestler

Personal information
- Nationality: Finnish
- Born: 2 May 1932 Kotka, Finland
- Died: 17 April 2009 (aged 76) Keski-Suomi, Finland

Sport
- Sport: Wrestling

Väinö Hakkarainen (2 May 1932 – 17 April 2009) was a Finnish wrestler. He competed in the men's freestyle lightweight at the 1956 Summer Olympics.
