= Roger Skauen =

Norwegian wrestler (born 1934)

Personal information
- Nationality: Norwegian
- Born: 11 November 1934 (age 91) Fredrikstad, Norway

Sport
- Sport: Wrestling

Roger Gunnar Skauen (born 11 November 1934) is a Norwegian wrestler. He competed in the men's Greco-Roman lightweight at the 1960 Summer Olympics.
