= Ray Lougheed =

Canadian wrestler (born 1934)

Personal information
- Born: 2 September 1934 (age 91) Fort William, Ontario, Canada

Sport
- Sport: Wrestling

Ray Lougheed (born 2 September 1934) is a Canadian wrestler. He competed in the men's freestyle lightweight at the 1960 Summer Olympics, coming in eighth.
