= Georgi Zaychev =

Bulgarian wrestler (born 1956)

Personal information
- Full name: Georgi Dimitrov Zaychev
- Nationality: Bulgarian
- Born: 25 March 1933

Sport
- Sport: Wrestling

Georgi Zaychev (born 25 March 1933) is a Bulgarian wrestler. He competed in the men's freestyle lightweight at the 1956 Summer Olympics.
