= Jan Kuczyński =

Polish wrestler

Personal information
- Nationality: Polish
- Born: 7 January 1935 Wilno, Poland
- Died: 28 November 2009 (aged 74) Gdańsk, Poland

Sport
- Sport: Wrestling

Jan Kuczyński (7 January 1935 – 28 November 2009) was a Polish wrestler. He competed in the men's freestyle lightweight at the 1960 Summer Olympics.
