= Erik Thomsen =

Danish wrestler

Personal information
- Nationality: Danish
- Born: 14 December 1935 Copenhagen, Denmark
- Died: 12 April 2012 (aged 76)

Sport
- Sport: Wrestling

Erik Thomsen (14 December 1935 – 12 April 2012) was a Danish wrestler. He competed in the men's Greco-Roman lightweight at the 1960 Summer Olympics.
