= Bong Chang-won =

South Korean wrestler (born 1938)

Personal information
- Nationality: South Korean
- Born: 19 February 1938 (age 88) Seoul, South Korea
- Height: 172 cm (5 ft 8 in)
- Weight: 67 kg (148 lb)

Korean name
- Hangul: 봉창원
- Hanja: 奉昶元
- RR: Bong Changwon
- MR: Pong Ch'angwŏn

Sport
- Sport: Wrestling
Medal record
Representing South Korea
Men's Wrestling
Asian Games
Bronze medal – third place	1958 Tokyo	Freestyle lightweight

Bong Chang-won, also written as Bong Ug-won and Bong Uk-won (Korean: 봉창원; born 19 February 1938) is a South Korean former wrestler.

He won the bronze medal at the 1958 Asian Games in Tokyo in the freestyle lightweight event.

In 1959, Bong was in military service with the Republic of Korea Marine Corps. He participated in the South Korean qualifying tournament for the 1959 World Wrestling Championships, but lost by decision to Cheon Dong-mun (Note: 천동문; 千東文) of the Republic of Korea Army.

He competed in the men's freestyle lightweight at the 1960 Summer Olympics.

By 1961, he was attending Kyung Hee University. He came in first place in the lightweight category in the South Korean qualifying tournament for the 1961 World Wrestling Championships, defeating his classmate Hwang Yong-deuk (Note: 황룡득; 黃龍得) and Gukhak University (Note: A predecessor school of Woosuk University, which was merged into Korea University in 1971) student Kim Ik-jong.

He continued wrestling, and finished in sixth place at the 1962 Asian Games in the freestyle 70 kg event.
