= Jacques Pourtau =

French wrestler

Personal information
- Nationality: French
- Born: 12 November 1935 (age 90) Tarnos, France

Sport
- Sport: Wrestling

Jacques Pourtau (born 12 November 1935) is a French wrestler. He competed in the men's Greco-Roman lightweight at the 1960 Summer Olympics.
