= Mostafa Tajik =

Iranian wrestler

Personal information
- Nationality: Iranian
- Born: 6 April 1932 Tehran, Iran
- Died: 15 June 2010 (aged 78)

Sport
- Sport: Wrestling

Mostafa Tajik (Persian: مصطفی تاجیک, 6 April 1932 – 15 June 2010) was an Iranian wrestler. He competed in the men's freestyle lightweight at the 1960 Summer Olympics, finishing in fourth place.
