= Ben Northrup =

American wrestler

Personal information
- Born: February 18, 1935 (age 91) Pullman, Washington, U.S.

Sport
- Sport: Wrestling
- Event: Greco-Roman

Ben Northrup (born February 18, 1935) is an American former wrestler. He competed in the men's Greco-Roman lightweight at the 1960 Summer Olympics.
