= John Schumacher =

John Schumacher may refer to:

- John Schumacher (pioneer) (c. 1816–1885), German immigrant, landowner and councilman in Los Angeles, California
- John J. Schumacher, founded Southwestern University School of Law in 1911
- John N. Schumacher (1927–2014), American-born Filipino priest, historian, and educator

== See also ==
- John Schuhmacher (born 1995), American football player
