= Edmund Seger =

German wrestler (1937–2019)

Personal information
- Nationality: German
- Born: 16 February 1937 Freiburg im Breisgau, Germany
- Died: 26 May 2019 (aged 82)

Sport
- Sport: Wrestling

Edmund Seger (16 February 1937 – 26 May 2019) was a German wrestler. He competed in the men's Greco-Roman lightweight at the 1960 Summer Olympics.
