= Ibrahim Awariki =

Lebanese wrestler

Personal information
- Nationality: Lebanese
- Born: 22 January 1928 Nabatieh, Lebanon
- Died: 15 September 2002 (aged 74)

Sport
- Sport: Wrestling

Ibrahim Awariki (22 January 1928 – 15 September 2002) was a Lebanese wrestler. He competed in the men's Greco-Roman lightweight at the 1960 Summer Olympics.
