= Vladimir Sinyavsky =

Ukrainian wrestler (1932–2012)

Personal information
- Born: 18 February 1932 Zinkivske, Derhachi Raion, Kharkiv Oblast, Ukrainian SSR, Soviet Union
- Died: 27 December 2012 (aged 80)
- Height: 160 cm (5 ft 3 in)

Sport
- Sport: Freestyle wrestling
- Club: Lokomotiv Kyiv
- Coached by: Armenak Yaltyryan
Medal record
Representing the Soviet Union
Olympic Games
Silver medal – second place	1960 Rome	67 kg
World Championships
Gold medal – first place	1959 Tehran	67 kg
Silver medal – second place	1961 Yokohama	67 kg
World Cup
Gold medal – first place	1958 Sofia	67 kg

Vladimir Ivanovich Synyavsky (Ukrainian: Володимир Іванович Синявський; 18 February 1932 – 27 December 2012) was a lightweight freestyle wrestler from Ukraine who won a world title in 1959 and placed second at the 1960 Olympics and 1961 World Championships. At the 1959 World Championships he won all his opponents by fall.

Sinyavsky took up wrestling in 1950, when he started to work at the Kharkiv Electromechanical Plant UkrElektroMash, and won the Soviet lightweight title in 1957–59 and 1961, finishing second in 1960. His left wrist was handicapped for life by an explosion during World War II. After retiring from competitions in 1966 he worked as a wrestling coach in Kyiv.
