= Kurt Schumacher (disambiguation) =

Kurt Schumacher (1895–1952) was a German politician.

Kurt Schumacher may also refer to:

- Kurt Schumacher (American football) (born 1952), American football player
- Kurt Schumacher (sculptor) (1905–1942), German sculptor
- Kurt Schumacher (SS officer) (1923–1945), German SS officer
- Marcel Cordes (born Kurt Schumacher, 1920–1992), German baritone

== See also ==
- Kurt-Schumacher-Platz (Berlin U-Bahn), station on Berlin U-Bahn, named after the German politician
