= Rafael Duran (wrestler) =

Venezuelan wrestler

Personal information
- Born: 17 March 1938 (age 88) Caracas, Venezuela

Sport
- Sport: Wrestling

Rafael Duran (born 17 March 1938) is a Venezuelan wrestler. He competed in the men's freestyle lightweight at the 1960 Summer Olympics.
