= Leo Piek =

Dutch wrestler

Personal information
- Nationality: Dutch
- Born: 7 September 1927 Utrecht, Netherlands
- Died: 1 June 2013 (aged 85)

Sport
- Sport: Wrestling

Leo Piek (7 September 1927 – 1 June 2013) was a Dutch wrestler. He competed in the men's Greco-Roman lightweight at the 1960 Summer Olympics.
