= Din Muhammad =

Pakistani wrestler (born 1936)

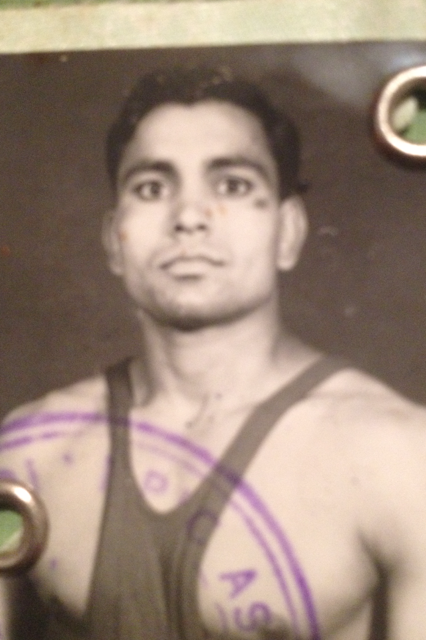

Personal information
- Full name: Din Muhammad
- Nickname: Mohammad Din
- Nationality: Pakistani
- Born: 9 October 1936 (age 89) Jalandhar, British India

Sport
- Sport: Wrestling (freestyle)
- Event: Lightweight / flyweight (67 kg)
- Club: Pakistan Wrestling Federation

Din Muhammad (Urdu: دین محمد; born 9 October 1936), also known as Mohammad Din, is a Pakistani former wrestler. He was national champion from 1957 to 1960 and competed at the 1960 Summer Olympics.

== Career ==
Din was born on 9 October 1936, in Jalandhar, British India, later moving to Faisalabad, Pakistan, in 1947, where he began his wrestling career. Mohammed was Pakistan Champion from 1957 to 1960.

== Olympics ==
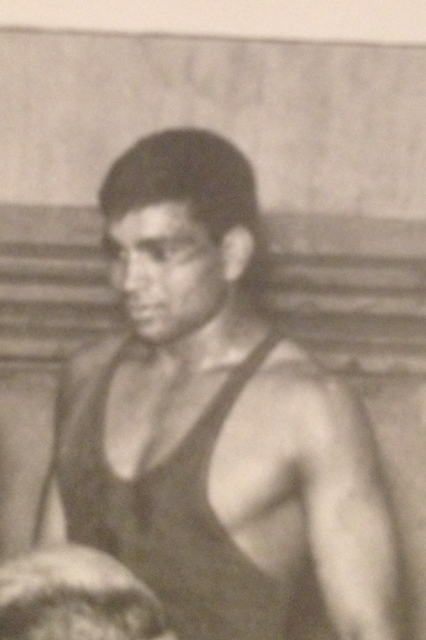
Mohammad Din at Summer Olympics 1960 Rome

He competed in the 1960 Summer Olympics in Rome. The wrestling events during the games were held at the Basilica of Maxentius.

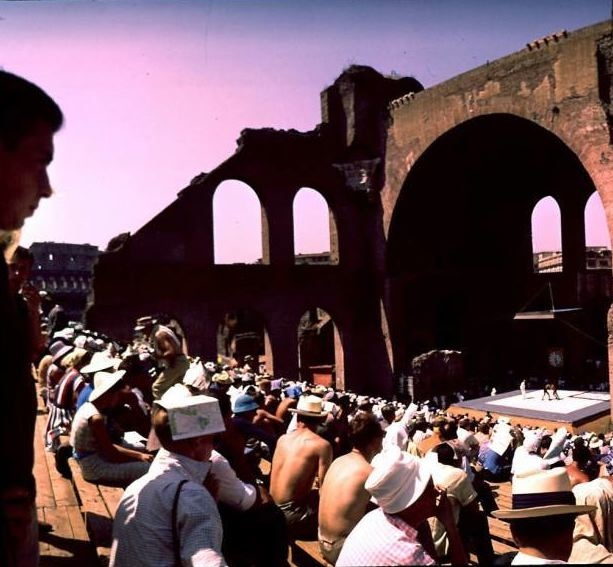
Basilica of Maxentius

During Din's appearance at the Olympics he competed in the lightweight (67 kg) division and was ranked joint 12th out of 24. He achieved the following results:

- 1st round; Beaten by M Tajiki (IRN) by fall
- 2nd round; Beat N Stamulis (AUS) on points
- 3rd round; Beat R Bielle (FRA) on points

== After retirement ==
Following his retirement in 1968, Din moved his family from Pakistan to Manchester. He was married to Basheran. The marriage produced five children. He began a small sweet shop in Manchester, Nafees Sweet Centre, named after his youngest son Nafees Din a cricketer. Latterly, the family also began a sports shop, which was named ND Sports, after Din's youngest son.
