= Magdaleno Cano =

Mexican cyclist (1933–2009)

Personal information
- Born: 29 May 1933 Celaya, Mexico
- Died: 8 January 2009 (aged 75) Moctezuma, Mexico

Cycling career
- Sport: Cycling

Magdaleno Cano (29 May 1933 – 8 January 2009) was a Mexican cyclist. He competed in the individual and team road race events at the 1956 Summer Olympics.
