= Robert P. Schumaker =

Robert P. Schumaker is an American data scientist and professor of computer science at the University of Texas at Tyler. He is the founder and director of the Data Analytics Lab in the Soules College of Business. His research focuses on predictive data analytics, financial text mining, healthcare informatics, and sports analytics. Schumaker is best known for creating AZFinText, a news-aware high-frequency stock trading system. Schumaker is also known as a Sports Analytics expert for his pioneering work using Twitter tweet sentiment to predict sports outcomes and has published research in is prescription drug adverse interaction and COVID-19 vaccine allergies.

== Education ==
Schumaker received a B.S. degree in civil engineering from the University of Cincinnati, an MBA in Management and International Business from the University of Akron and a Ph.D. in Management Information Systems from the University of Arizona. While at the University of Arizona, Schumaker created the Arizona Financial Text (AZFinText) System which learns the words used in financial news articles to predict future stock prices.

== Academic Career ==
He is currently professor of computer science at the University of Texas at Tyler. He previously held faculty positions at Central Connecticut State University, Cleveland State University, and Iona College.

== Research ==
His work spans multiple domains:

- Finance
  - Creator of AZFinText, a news-aware high-frequency trading system
- Sports Analytics
  - Authored numerous papers on greyhound and harness racing prediction
  - Developed models using Twitter sentiment to predict outcomes of NFL matches and Premier League games
  - Authored a book on Sports Data Mining (2010; ISBN 978-1-4419-6729-9)
- Healthcare Informatics
  - Research in adverse drug event detection using natural language processing
  - Investigated covid-19 vaccine allergic reactions

== Publications ==
Schumaker has published extensively in academic journals including "ACM Transactions on Information Systems," "Decision Support Systems," and "Communications of the ACM." His research spans financial text mining, sports analytics, and healthcare informatics, and has been featured in "MIT Technology Review" and "The Wall Street Journal."

== Professional Service ==
He served as past editor of the Communications of the International Information Management Association journal from 2010 to 2015 and as associate editor for the journal Decision Support Systems from 2014 to 2022. He was an ACM distinguished speaker from 2013 to 2019 and is a Fellow of the International Information Management Association (IIMA). He has served on review boards and program committees for numerous conferences and journals.

== Media coverage ==
His work has been covered by MIT Technology Review, The Wall Street Journal, The Chronicle of Higher Education, Axios, and Slashdot. His research on both financial text analysis and sports analytics has received attention in both academic and mainstream media.
