= Felipe Liñán =

Mexican cyclist

Personal information
- Born: 1931 Soledad de Graciano Sánchez, Mexico
- Died: 7 August 1975 (aged 43–44) San Luis Potosí City, Mexico

Cycling career
- Sport: Cycling

Felipe Liñán (26 May 1931 – 7 August 1975) was a Mexican cyclist. He competed in the individual and team road race events at the 1956 Summer Olympics.
