= Tony Ries Jr. =

South African wrestler

Personal information
- Full name: Anthony Ries Jr.
- Nationality: South African
- Born: 27 September 1939 (age 86) Johannesburg, South Africa

Sport
- Sport: Wrestling

Anthony Ries Jr. (born 27 September 1939) is a South African wrestler. He competed in the men's freestyle lightweight at the 1960 Summer Olympics.
