= Mario De Silva =

Italian wrestler (1935–2025)

Personal information
- Nationality: Italian
- Born: 29 December 1935 Genoa, Italy
- Died: 17 March 2025 (aged 89) Genoa, Italy

Sport
- Sport: Wrestling

Mario De Silva (29 December 1935 – 17 March 2025) was an Italian wrestler. He competed in the men's Greco-Roman lightweight at the 1960 Summer Olympics.

De Silva died on 17 March 2025, at the age of 89.
