= AZFinText =

Financial prediction system

Arizona Financial Text System (AZFinText) is a textual-based quantitative financial prediction system written by Robert P. Schumaker of University of Texas at Tyler and Hsinchun Chen of the University of Arizona.

== System ==
This system differs from other systems in that it uses financial text as one of its key means of predicting stock price movement. This reduces the information lag-time problem evident in many similar systems where new information must be transcribed (e.g., such as losing a costly court battle or having a product recall), before the quant can react appropriately. AZFinText overcomes these limitations by utilizing the terms used in financial news articles to predict future stock prices twenty minutes after the news article has been released.

It is believed that certain article terms can move stocks more than others. Terms such as factory exploded or workers strike will have a depressing effect on stock prices whereas terms such as earnings rose will tend to increase stock prices.

The AZFinText system analyzes financial news to identify the patterns in how investors react to such specific information. It uses methods like sentiment analysis and term weighting to examine the text of news articles. This system is designed to find price differences that occur when the market responds to news stories. This approach provides an alternative and easier method for predicting stock market movements.

== Overview of research ==
The foundation of AZFinText can be found in the ACM TOIS article. Within this paper, the authors tested several different prediction models and linguistic textual representations. From this work, it was found that using the article terms and the price of the stock at the time the article was released was the most effective model and using proper nouns was the most effective textual representation technique. Combining the two, AZFinText netted a 2.84% trading return over the five-week study period.

AZFinText was then extended to study what combination of peer organizations help to best train the system. Using the premise that IBM has more in common with Microsoft than GM, AZFinText studied the effect of varying peer-based training sets. To do this, AZFinText trained on the various levels of GICS and evaluated the results. It was found that sector-based training was most effective, netting an 8.50% trading return, outperforming Jim Cramer, Jim Jubak and DayTraders.com during the study period. AZFinText was also compared against the top 10 quantitative systems and outperformed 6 of them.

A third study investigated the role of portfolio building in a textual financial prediction system. From this study, Momentum and Contrarian stock portfolios were created and tested. Using the premise that past winning stocks will continue to win and past losing stocks will continue to lose, AZFinText netted a 20.79% return during the study period. It was also noted that traders were generally overreacting to news events, creating the opportunity of abnormal returns.

A fourth study looked into using author sentiment as an added predictive variable. Using the premise that an author can unwittingly influence market trades simply by the terms they use, AZFinText was tested using tone and polarity features. It was found that Contrarian activity was occurring within the market, where articles of a positive tone would decrease in price and articles of a negative tone would increase in price.

A further study investigated what article verbs have the most influence on stock price movement. From this work, it was found that planted, announcing, front, smaller and crude had the highest positive impact on stock price.

== Notable publicity ==
AZFinText has been the topic of discussion by numerous media outlets. Some of the more notable ones include The Wall Street Journal, MIT's Technology Review, Dow Jones Newswire, WBIR in Knoxville, TN, Slashdot and other media outlets.
