= Shigeru Kasahara =

Japanese freestyle wrestler

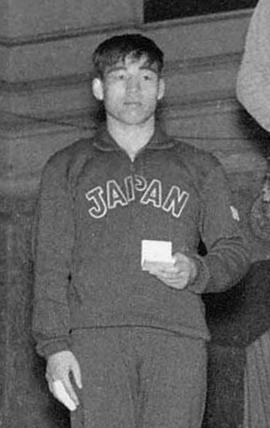
- Kasahara at the 1956 Olympics

Personal information
- Born: June 11, 1933 Niigata Prefecture, Japan
- Died: November 13, 1990 (aged 57)

Sport
- Sport: Freestyle wrestling
Medal record
Representing Japan
Olympic Games
Silver medal – second place	1956 Melbourne	67 kg
Asian Games
Gold medal – first place	1954 Manila	62 kg

Shigeru Kasahara (Japanese: 笠原 茂, June 11, 1933 - November 11, 1990) was a Japanese lightweight freestyle wrestler. He won a gold medal at the 1954 Asian Games and a silver at the 1956 Summer Olympics.
