= Mateo Tanaquin =

Filipino wrestler (1927–1988)

Personal information
- Full name: Mateo Taronga Tañaquin
- Nationality: Filipino
- Born: 11 September 1927 Tigbauan, Iloilo, Philippines
- Died: 19 March 1988 (aged 60) Bacoor, Cavite, Philippines

Sport
- Sport: Wrestling

Mateo Taronga Tañaquin (11 September 1927 – 19 March 1988) was a Filipino wrestler. He competed in the men's freestyle lightweight at the 1956 Summer Olympics. Tanaquin died in Bacoor, Cavite on 19 March 1988, at the age of 60.
