= Jenna Shoemaker =

American actress

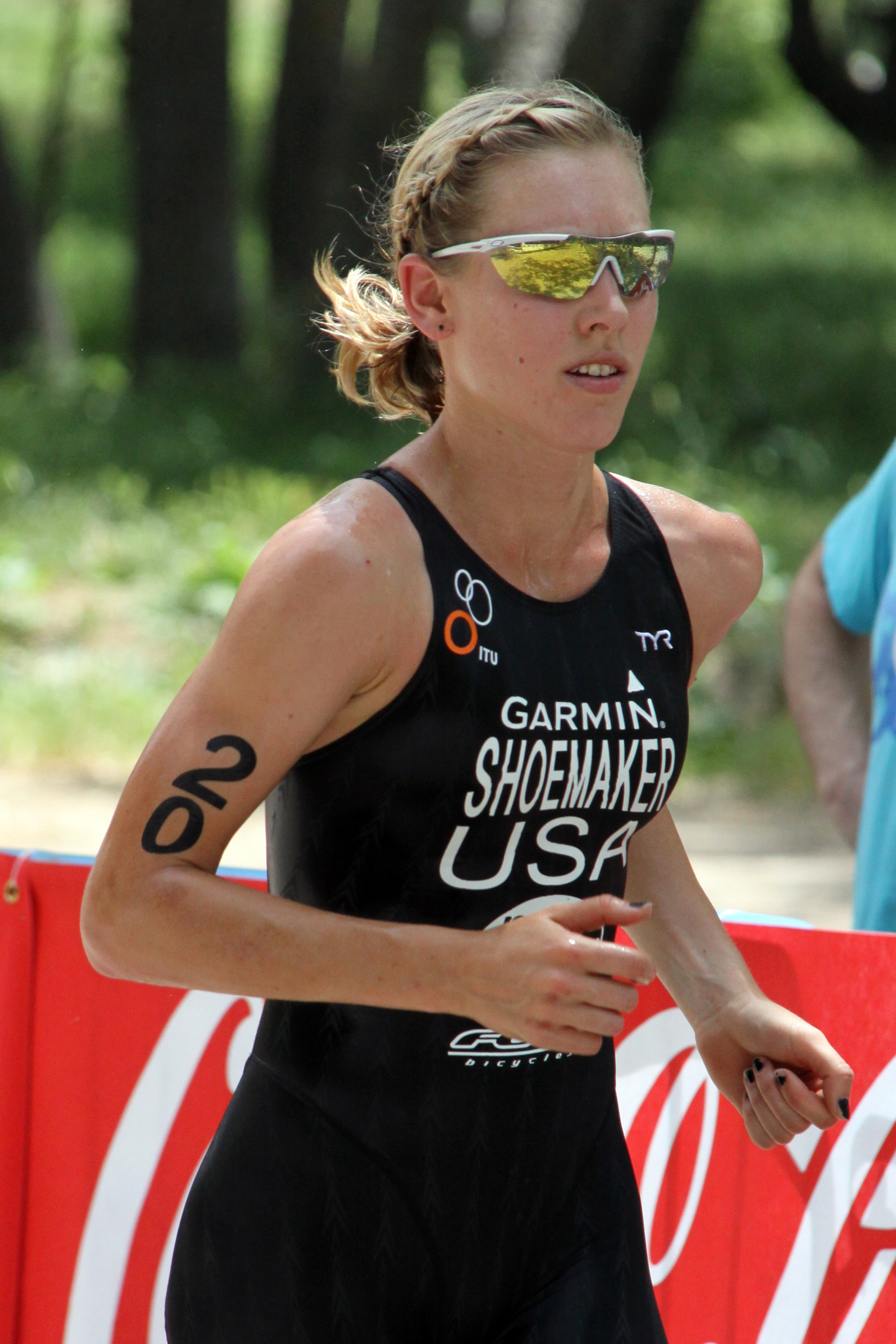
Jenna Shoemaker at the World Championship Series triathlon in Madrid, 2010

Jenna Shoemaker (born April 20, 1984) is an actor, writer, former professional US triathlete and former member of the USA National Team. In 2009, she legally changed her name to Jenna Parker.

In 2010 Parker was number 49 in the World Championship Series ranking and number 5 in the USAT ranking. In 2012, she competed at the USA Triathlon Olympic Trials in San Diego, California. Her highest rankings came in 2009 when she was ranked number 1 in the US and number 17 in the World.

In 2010, she was featured in the October Issue, XX Factor, of Outside Magazine and on NBC's Last Call with Carson Daly.

Parker holds a psychology degree from Harvard University. Her brother Jarrod Shoemaker is a former professional triathlete, 2009 Duathlon World Champion and 2008 US Olympian.

In 2013, Parker retired from professional racing after winning the New York City Triathlon and finishing third at the Beijing International Triathlon.

She was coached by Brett Sutton from January to June of the 2013 season, and by Darren Smith from September 2008 until April 2010. She also had a short residency from late 2010 to early 2011 working with Terrence Mahon and the Mammoth Track Club.

In 2015, Parker was a member of the Harvey Cedars Beach Patrol team that finished second at the first annual Red Bull Surf and Rescue event held in Atlantic City, New Jersey. Parker was featured in the mini-documentary around the event. She has raced for the Harvey Cedars Beach Patrol since 2014 and has been part of the 11 year LBIBPA Championships winning streak, which started in 2014 after a 42-year drought for the town. She is also featured in the documentary "How The Waves Were Won". She is the only woman to win the Cape May Women's Point Challenge event more than twice with a record six victories to her name (2014, 2016, 2017, 2019, 2021, 2024), she finished 5th at the Superathalon in Cape May - a 2.3 mile run, 2 mile row, and .5 mile swim - in 2024 as the only female in the field and won the women's division, finishing with the 7th fastest time overall, in 2026. She has won the American Ironwoman race (run, swim, paddle, row) at the LBIBPA Championships eight times since its debut in 2016.

In 2016, Parker was cast as the lead character "Tracy" in the SyFy feature film, produced by The Asylum, titled Ice Sharks. She has hosted both the IMG Escape from Alcatraz and Beijing International Triathlon events (airing on CBS Sports Network in the US). In June of 2025, she was featured on the cover of NJ Monthly Magazine.

Parker is represented by Metropolis Artists Agency, Long Island Models and Arise Artists Agency.

== ITU Competitions ==
In the seven years from 2004 to 2010, Shoemaker took part in 48 ITU competitions and achieved 13 top ten positions.

The following list is based upon the official ITU rankings and the athlete's Profile Page. Unless indicated otherwise, the competitions are triathlons (Olympic distance) and belong to the Elite category.

Date	Competition	Place	Rank
2004-05-09	World Championships (AG 20–24)	Madeira	11
2005-06-12	Caribbean Cup	Rincon	6
2005-07-10	Pan American Cup	New York	13
2005-07-17	World Cup	Corner Brook	12
2005-09-10	World Championships (U23)	Gamagori	DNF
2005-09-17	OSIM World Cup	Beijing	39
2006-04-16	World Cup	Ishigaki	24
2006-05-14	Pan American Cup	Honolulu	12
2006-06-04	BG World Cup	Madrid	48
2006-06-25	Pan American Cup	Long Beach	DNF
2006-07-02	Pan American Cup	Brampton	DNF
2006-08-05	Pan American Cup	Bridgeport	18
2006-08-20	Pan American Cup	Kelowna	10
2006-09-17	Pan American Cup	Rye Westchester	19
2006-09-24	BG World Cup	Beijing	DNS
2007-04-01	Pan American Cup	Santo Domingo	17
2007-05-12	Pan American Cup	Ixtapa	15
2007-05-20	Pan American Cup	Honolulu	19
2007-06-03	BG World Cup	Madrid	DNF
2007-07-07	Premium European Cup	Holten	DNF
2007-07-14	Pan American Cup	Geneva	20
2007-08-05	Pan American Cup	Drummondville	16
2007-08-12	Pan American Cup	Longmont	DNF
2008-01-06	Premium Pan American Cup	Viña del Mar	9
2008-01-13	Pan American Cup	La Paz	14
2008-03-08	Pan American Cup	Valle de Bravo	DNF
2008-04-13	BG World Cup	Ishigaki	32
2008-04-19	PATCO Pan American Championship	Mazatlan	13
2008-05-25	BG World Cup	Madrid	DNF
2008-07-12	European Cup	Athlone	4
2008-07-20	BG World Cup	Kitzbühel	28
2008-07-27	Premium European Cup	Poznan	6
2008-09-27	Asian Cup	Suixian	8
2009-03-01	OTU Oceania Championships	Gold Coast	8
2009-03-29	World Cup	Mooloolaba	14
2009-04-05	Oceania Cup	New Plymouth	6
2009-04-25	Pan American Cup	Mazatlan	1
2009-05-16	PATCO Pan American Championships	Oklahoma	2
2009-05-25	Pan American Cup	Austin	3
2009-06-21	Dextro Energy World Championship Series	Washington DC	DNF
2009-07-25	Dextro Energy World Championship Series	Hamburg	24
2009-08-15	Dextro Energy World Championship Series	London	32
2009-08-22	Pan American Cup	Tuscaloosa	2
2010-04-11	Dextro Energy World Championship Series	Sydney	23
2010-04-18	World Cup	Monterrey	9
2010-06-05	Dextro Energy World Championship Series	Madrid	27
2010-06-12	Elite Cup	Hy-Vee	18
2010-07-17	Dextro Energy World Championship Series	Hamburg	23
2010-07-24	Dextro Energy World Championship Series	London	40

BG = the sponsor British Gas
DNS = did not start
DNF = did not finish
