= Jarrod Shoemaker =

American triathlete

Personal information
- Born: July 17, 1982 (age 43)
- Height: 5 ft 11 in (1.80 m)
- Weight: 145 lb (66 kg)
- Other interests: Boston Red Sox, Boston Bruins, New England Patriots

Sport
- Country: United States
- Turned pro: 2004
Medal record
Men's Duathlon
Representing United States
ITU Duathlon World Championships
Gold medal – first place	2009	Individual

Jarrod Shoemaker (born July 17, 1982) is a professional triathlete based in Maynard, Massachusetts. He is the 2009 ITU Duathlon World Champion.

== Athletic career ==
Raised in Sudbury, Massachusetts, Shoemaker began his running career while attending the Fenn School in Concord, where he graduated from 8th grade. In 2000, Shoemaker graduated from Lincoln-Sudbury Regional High School where he earned ten varsity letters in cross-country (4), swimming (4), and track (2); served as captain of each team; and contributed to the school's state high school swimming championship in 1998. He continued his athletic career as a cross-country and track star at Dartmouth College, from which he graduated in 2004 with a major in history. While at Dartmouth, Shoemaker competed twice in the NCAA Division I Cross Country Championships and once in the Division I Outdoor Track Championships. In 1999, Shoemaker was a Boston Globe All-Scholastic in cross country running and qualified for the Footlocker National High School Cross Country Championships, where he finished 22nd in Orlando, FL.

In October 2002, Shoemaker won the Heptagonal Cross-Country Championship held at Van Cortlandt Park, Bronx, New York. In September 2005, Shoemaker won the Under 23 Triathlon World Championship in Ishigaki, Japan. On September 16, 2007, Shoemaker qualified for the 2008 Beijing Olympics by defeating 2005 International Triathlon Union World Number One Hunter Kemper and two-time ITU World Cup winner Andy Potts. Shoemaker was featured on the Wheaties Box in 2008 for his Olympic Qualification accomplishment. At the 2008 Olympics, Shoemaker finished 18th. He became world champion in duathlon in 2009 in Concord, North Carolina. In 2014, Shoemaker finished 7th at the ITU Triathlon World Championship in Edmonton, Alberta, Canada. Shoemaker's finish was the highest male finish for an American triathlete at a world championship event. Jarrod's sister Jenna Shoemaker was also a professional triathlete and a former member of the US National Team.
