= Muhammad Ashraf (wrestler) =

Pakistani wrestler (born 1927)

Personal information
- Nationality: Pakistani
- Born: 11 October 1927 (age 98)

Sport
- Sport: Wrestling
Medal record
Commonwealth Games
Gold medal – first place	1958 Cardiff	Lightweight
Asian Games
Bronze medal – third place	1954 Manila	Lightweight

Choudhry Muhammad Ashraf (born 11 October 1927) is a Pakistani wrestler who was twice the Commonwealth wrestling champion (in 1958 and the 1954 Asian Games silver medalist. He competed in the men's freestyle lightweight at the 1956 Summer Olympics.
