= José Yañez =

Cuban wrestler (1932–2015)

Personal information
- Full name: José Antonio Yáñez Ordaz
- Born: 19 March 1932 Havana, Cuba
- Died: 17 March 2015 (aged 82) Havana, Cuba

Sport
- Sport: Wrestling

José Antonio Yáñez Ordaz (19 March 1932 – 17 March 2015) was a Cuban wrestler. He competed in the men's freestyle lightweight at the 1960 Summer Olympics. Yañez died in Havana on 17 March 2015, at the age of 82.
