= Marta Schuhmacher =

Professor and Researcher of Environmental Technology

Marta Schuhmacher is a distinguished professor of environmental technology at the Department of Chemical Engineering at Universitat Rovira i Virgili, Tarragona, Spain. She is known for her work linking the presence of chemicals with environmental and human health issues.

== Career ==
Schuhmacher did her degree in Chemistry (1976), and received a B.Sc. in 1991 from UNED, and completed her Ph.D. in 1990 from University of Zaragoza, Spain. Later, she also did a master's in engineering and environmental management from School of Industrial Organization, Ministry of Industry and Energy, Madrid, Spain (1995).

She has been teaching at DEQ since 1993, and in 2009, she became a professor or Catedrática. Since 2015, she has been a distinguished professor at the University of Rovira i Virgili. She served as the director of the AGA Research Group (Environmental Analysis and Management) of the Chemical Engineering department of the Rovira i Virgili University and the Tecnatox center till 2023. As of 2024 she is a full professor of environmental technology at the Universitat Rovira i Virgili.

== Research ==
Schuhmacher is known for her work in examining pollution, specifically suspended particulate matter, in schools. She has also examined the presence of microplastics in marine systems, and compared models used to define toxicity. Schuhmacher has focused on the development of techniques for risk assessment, and their application to new and emerging chemical compounds, and very particularly to that of mixtures.

== Selected publications ==
- Sonnemann, Guido; Castells, Francesc; Schuhmacher, Marta; Hauschild, Michael (2004). "Integrated life-cycle and risk assessment for industrial processes". The International Journal of Life Cycle Assessment. 9 (3): 206–207. doi:10.1007/BF02994195. ISSN 0948-3349.
- Rosenbaum, Ralph K.; Bachmann, Till M.; Gold, Lois Swirsky; Huijbregts, Mark A. J.; Jolliet, Olivier; Juraske, Ronnie; Koehler, Annette; Larsen, Henrik F.; MacLeod, Matthew; Margni, Manuele; McKone, Thomas E.; Payet, Jérôme; Schuhmacher, Marta; van de Meent, Dik; Hauschild, Michael Z. (2008). "USEtox—the UNEP-SETAC toxicity model: recommended characterisation factors for human toxicity and freshwater ecotoxicity in life cycle impact assessment". The International Journal of Life Cycle Assessment. 13 (7): 532–546. doi:10.1007/s11367-008-0038-4. hdl:2066/72404. ISSN 0948-3349.
- Karri, Venkatanaidu; Schuhmacher, Marta; Kumar, Vikas (2016). "Heavy metals (Pb, Cd, As and MeHg) as risk factors for cognitive dysfunction: A general review of metal mixture mechanism in brain". Environmental Toxicology and Pharmacology. 48: 203–213. doi:10.1016/j.etap.2016.09.016.
- Schuhmacher, Marta; Domingo, Jose L.; Garreta, Josepa (2004-06-01). "Pollutants emitted by a cement plant: health risks for the population living in the neighborhood". Environmental Research. 95 (2): 198–206. doi:10.1016/j.envres.2003.08.011. ISSN 0013-9351.

== Awards and honors ==
Schuhmacher received recognition with the President Macià Work Medal in 2023.
