= Beijing International Triathlon =

The Beijing International Triathlon is a world-class, Olympic distance triathlon in the Fengtai District of Beijing.

The race consists of a 1.5 km swim in Qing Long Lake, a 40 km bike race from the Park to Qian Ling Mountain and back, and a 10 km run through the trails and pathways of Qing Long Lake Park.

The Beijing International Triathlon is the newest international event to be added to the Escape TO Alcatraz Triathlon Series. The top 50 finishers across all divisions will qualify for an entry into the next year's Escape from Alcatraz Triathlon in San Francisco, CA.

== 2013 ==
Date: September 21, 2013

Location: Qinglong Lake Park, Fengtai District, Beijing, China

== 2012 ==
Date: September 16, 2012

Results:

Pro Male:

Bevan Docherty, NZL, 1:54:24

Matt Reed, USA,1:55:04

Chris “Macca” McCormack, AUS, 1:56:37

Brian Fleishmann, USA, 1:58: 37

Bai Faquan, CHN, 2:03:03

Pro Female:

Sarah Groff, USA, 2:04:09

Nicky Samuels, NZL, 2:05:52

Becky Lavelle, USA, 2:06:40

Jenna Parker, USA, 2:06:47

Ricarda Lisk, GER, 2:14:32

Zhang Yi, CHN, 2:18:07
