= Ernest Gondzik =

Polish wrestler (1931–2021)

Personal information
- Nationality: Polish
- Born: 25 February 1931; Mysłowice, Poland
- Died: 13 August 2021 (aged 90)

Sport
- Sport: Wrestling

Ernest Gondzik (25 February 1931 – 13 August 2021) was a Polish wrestler. He competed at the 1952 Summer Olympics and the 1960 Summer Olympics.
