= Rubén Roca =

Cuban swimmer (born 1940)

Personal information
- Born: 12 December 1940 (age 85) Santiago de Cuba, Cuba

Sport
- Sport: Swimming

Rubén Roca (born 12 December 1940) is a Cuban former swimmer. He competed in two events at the 1960 Summer Olympics.
