= Gus Schumacher =

Gus Schumacher may refer to:

- Gus Schumacher (economist) (1939–2017), American agriculture official
- Gus Schumacher (skier) (born 2000), American professional athlete
