= Kyösti Lehtonen =

Finnish wrestler (1931–1987)

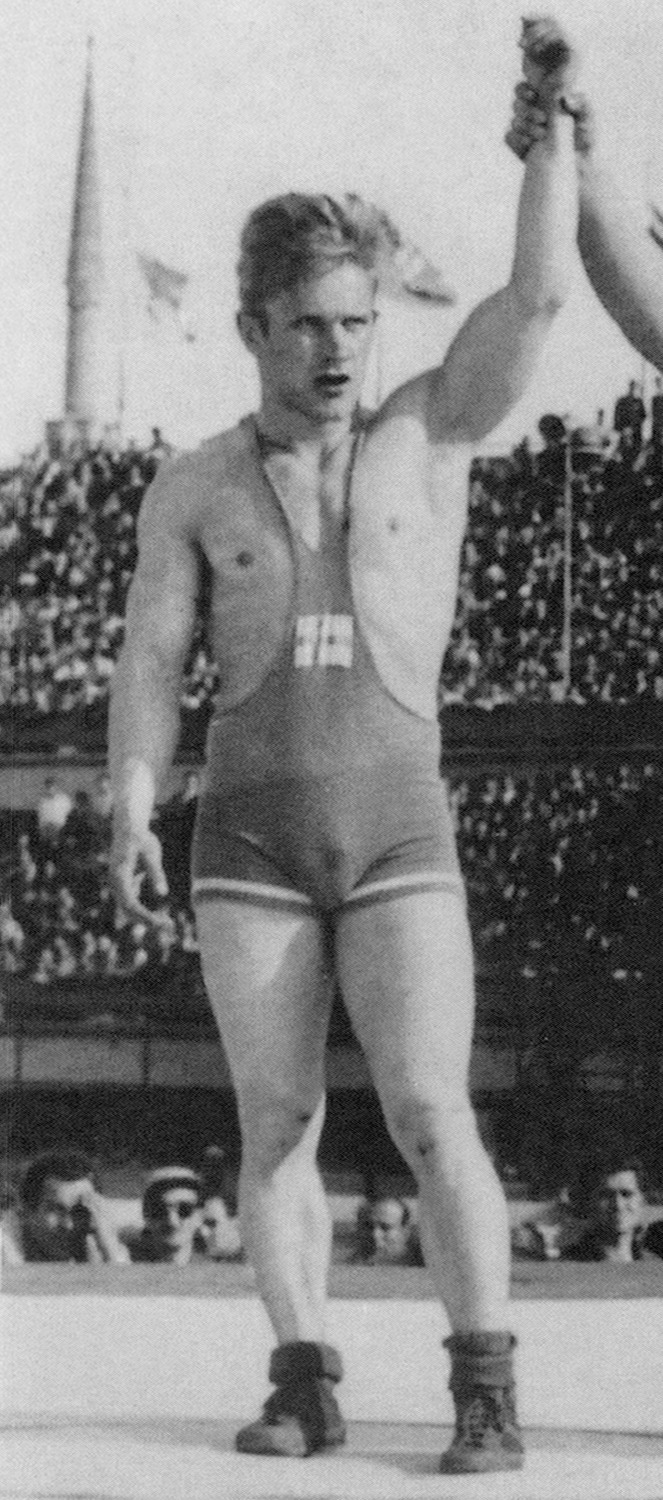
- Lehtonen at the 1956 Olympics

Personal information
- Born: 13 March 1931 Jämsä, Finland
- Died: 15 November 1987 (aged 56) Helsinki, Finland
- Height: 166 cm (5 ft 5 in)
- Weight: 67–74 kg (148–163 lb)

Sport
- Sport: Greco-Roman wrestling
- Club: Jämsänkosken Kiri; Jämsänkosken Voimailijat
Medal record
Men's Greco-Roman wrestling
Representing Finland
Olympic Games
Gold medal – first place	1956 Melbourne	67 kg
World Championships
Silver medal – second place	1953 Naples	67 kg
Silver medal – second place	1955 Karlsruhe	67 kg
World Cup
Silver medal – second place	1956 Istanbul	67 kg

Kyösti Eemil "Köpi" Lehtonen (13 March 1931 – 15 November 1987) was a lightweight Greco-Roman wrestler from Finland. He competed at the 1956, 1960 and 1964 Olympics and won a gold medal in 1956, placing fifth in 1960. Previously he won two silver medals at the world championships in 1953 and 1955. Domestically he won nine Finnish titles in 1952–57 and 1960–62. Lehtonen retired after the 1964 Olympics and coached the Norwegian (1964), Danish (1964) and Finnish national teams (1971–74). Later he was elected as a board member of the Finnish Wrestling Federation.
