= Adil Güngör =

Turkish wrestler

Personal information
- Full name: Ramazan Adil Güngör
- Nationality: Turkish
- Born: 1931 Denizli, Turkey
- Died: 18 February 2025 (aged 93–94)

Sport
- Sport: Wrestling

Ramazan Adil Güngör (1931 – 18 February 2025) was a Turkish wrestler. He competed at the 1956 Summer Olympics and the 1960 Summer Olympics.
