= Amir Jan Khalunder =

Afghan wrestler

Amir Jan Khalunder (born 20 November 1924) was an Afghan wrestler who competed at the 1960 Summer Olympics in the lightweight freestyle event. Khalunder was born in Kabul.
