= Kazuo Abe =

Japanese wrestler (born 1935)

Kazuo Abe (阿部 一男, Abe Kazuo; born 7 April 1935 in Niigata Prefecture, Japan) is a Japanese former wrestler who competed in the 1960 Summer Olympics.
