= Nick Stamulus =

Australian wrestler

Personal information
- Nationality: Australian
- Born: 11 September 1940 (age 84)

Sport
- Sport: Wrestling

Nick Stamulus (born 11 September 1940) is an Australian wrestler. He competed in two events at the 1960 Summer Olympics.
