= David Schumacher (producer) =

American filmmaker and musician

David Schumacher (born June 9, 1969) is an American film and television director/producer and musician. He won a 2011 Emmy Award for creating and producing the television series NYCMusicShow and a 1998 Bay Area Music Award for Best Jazz Artist with his band Junk.

== Early years ==
Schumacher is the son of Stanley and Virginia Schumacher and was born in Ottawa, Ontario, Canada. He later moved to Drumheller, Alberta where he completed high school after attending St. John's-Ravenscourt School in Winnipeg, Manitoba for his eighth grade. Upon graduating high school, David attended Berklee College of Music, where he graduated magna cum laude with a Bachelor of Music.

After graduating from Berklee in 1992, David moved to Oakland, California where he founded the jazz-funk group Junk.

== Family life ==
In 1998, Schumacher moved back to Ottawa, Ontario, where his son Noah was born in 1999. In 2001, he moved to New York City, where he met his wife, television writer/director Lala Wood, whom he married in 2005. The couple had a daughter in 2007.
