= David Schumacher (wrestler) =

Australian wrestler (1931–2022)

Personal information
- Nationality: Australian
- Born: 30 November 1931
- Died: 15 January 2022 (aged 90)

Sport
- Sport: Wrestling

David Schumacher (30 November 1931 – 15 January 2022) was an Australian wrestler. He competed in the men's freestyle lightweight at the 1956 Summer Olympics. Schumacher died on 15 January 2022, at the age of 90.
