= John Schumacher (Los Angeles pioneer) =

American pioneer

John Schumacher (about 1816–1885) was a German immigrant who became a wealthy landowner in Los Angeles, California, and was a member of that city's governing council.

== Personal ==
Schumacher was born in Germany about 1816 and died in Los Angeles on March 2, 1885, at the age of sixty-nine, of apoplexy, reported Harris Newmark, in his book Sixty Years in California.

Newmark called Schumacher "[a] good-hearted, honest German of the old school, and a first-class citizen", who had come from Wurtemberg to America. Newmark wrote that Schumacher arrived in California with Jonathan D. Stevenson's 1846 expedition to California, but a Los Angeles Times obituary of Schumacher's son, John, in 1885, stated instead that the elder John had been "one of [John C.] Fremont's veterans, who followed him in his historic trek to California."

Schumacher settled in Los Angeles in "1847 or 1848", Newmark wrote, and in 1849 he went to Sutter's Creek, where he "found a nugget of gold worth eight hundred dollars".

He returned to Los Angeles in 1853, where he purchased "100 feet of ground on the west side of Spring street, just off First street and extending through Broadway." In 1882 he built a two-story residence on Fort Street, between Franklin and First Streets.

Schumacher was "proficient in languages, and as an interpreter, often gave his time and services in serving his less-gifted neighbors, particularly the poor and unfortunate, to straighten out their affairs."

He was married in 1855 to Mary Uhrie, and they had six children, including three sons, John, Frank G., and F.F., and a daughter, Carrie. "The eldest daughter became Mrs. Edward A. Preuss." His wife died in 1880 when "at the railway station in Merced, she was jolted from the platform of a [train] car and was instantly killed."

The Schumachers bought one of the first pianos to be seen in Los Angeles, which had to be shipped from the East around Cape Horn. The family also owned a "spring wagon with a cover" made by local craftsman John Goller, which though "only a one-horse affair, but probably because of the springs and the top[,] which afforded protection from both the sun and the rain, it was looked upon as a curiosity."

== Vocation ==
Schumacher became a wealthy landowner in Los Angeles, but early on he had a grocery store, with a bar, "in a single room, as was then common." He had "bought nearly the whole block bounded by Spring and First streets and Franklin Alley for the value of his famous gold nugget, and there he remained until the early [eighteen] seventies."

For something else, however, Schumacher was especially known. . . . he put on sale the first lager beer introduced into Los Angeles, importing the same from San Francisco, of which enterprise the genial German was proud; but Schumacher acquired even more fame for a drink that he may be said to have invented, and which was known to the early settlers as Peach and Honey. It contained a good mixture with peach brandy, and was a great favorite, especially with politicians and frequenters of the neighboring Courthouse . . . . Whenever in fact anyone had a cold, or fancied that he was going to be so afflicted, he hastened to John for his reputedly-certain cure.

For a time in the late 1870s, Schumacher had a vineyard "opposite the site of the city gardens", and earlier he was in partnership with Jacob Bell in raising sheep.

== Common Council ==
Schumacher was elected to the Los Angeles Common Council, the governing body of the city, on May 7, 1866, and served two terms.
