= Dimitar Stoyanov (wrestler) =

Bulgarian wrestler

Personal information
- Full name: Dimitar Yanchev Stoyanov
- Nationality: Bulgarian
- Born: 17 June 1931; Haskovo, Bulgaria

Sport
- Sport: Wrestling

Dimitar Stoyanov (born 17 June 1931) is a Bulgarian former wrestler. He competed at the 1956 Summer Olympics and the 1960 Summer Olympics.
