= Anton Schumacher =

German footballer

Personal information
- Date of birth: 1 December 1938 (age 87)
- Place of birth: Bonn, Nazi Germany
- Position: Goalkeeper

Youth career
- 1950–1960: TuRa Bonn

Senior career*
Years	Team	Apps	(Gls)
1960–1968	1. FC Köln	79	(0)
1968–1969	Viktoria Köln		
- * Club domestic league appearances and goals

Anton "Toni" Schumacher (born 1 December 1938 in Bonn) is a German former professional football goalkeeper.

== Career ==
Schumacher played for 1. FC Köln since 1950, from 1963 to 1968 the team played in the Bundesliga. In 1964, he won the German Championship.

== Personal life ==
The goalkeeper Harald Schumacher who played for 1. FC Köln from 1972 to 1987 was also nicknamed "Toni" by the players of the team, to avoid misunderstandings between him and the defender Harald Konopka.
