= Juan Rolón =

Argentine wrestler (born 1930)

Personal information
- Full name: Juan Ángel Rolón Garbosa
- Born: 31 January 1930; Buenos Aires, Argentina

Sport
- Sport: Wrestling

Juan Rolón (born 31 January 1930) is an Argentine former wrestler. He competed at the 1956 Summer Olympics and the 1960 Summer Olympics.
