= Gyula Tóth (wrestler) =

Hungarian wrestler (1927–2001)

Medal record

Men's Greco-Roman wrestling

Representing Hungary

Olympic Games
Bronze medal – third place	1956 Melbourne	Lightweight

World Cup
Bronze medal – third place	1958 Sofia	Lightweight

Gyula Tóth (16 April 1927 in Salgótarján – 18 March 2001 in Budapest) was a Hungarian wrestler who competed in the 1956 Summer Olympics and in the 1960 Summer Olympics.
