= Mario Tovar González =

Mexican wrestler (1933–2011)

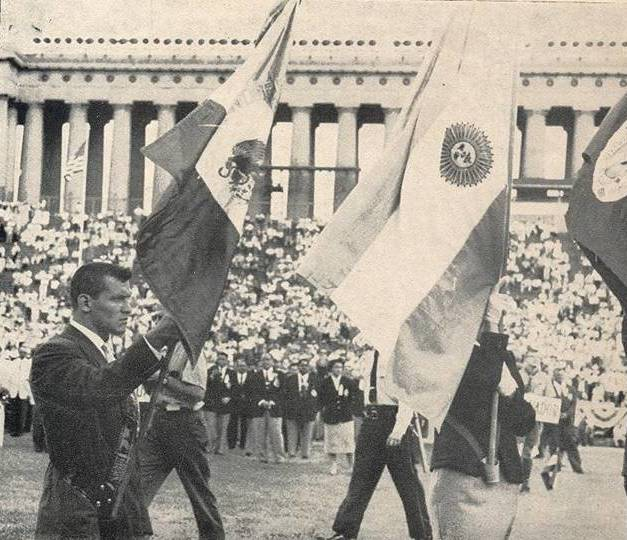
González at Soldier Field in Chicago serving as Mexico's flag bearer during the opening ceremony of the 1959 Pan American Games.

Mario Tovar González (15 August 1933 – 15 December 2011) was a Mexican wrestler who competed at five Olympic Games from 1952 to 1968. At the Pan American Games Tovar won a silver medal in lightweight freestyle in 1959, and bronze medals in 1955 lightweight freestyle and 1963 featherweight freestyle.
