= Boxing at the 1994 Asian Games =

Boxing competitions

- Venue: Naka Ward Sports Center
- Dates: 4–13 October 1994
- Competitors: 141 from 24 nations

The Boxing Tournament at the 1994 Asian Games was held in Naka Ward Sports Center, Hiroshima, Japan from October 4 to October 13, 1994.

The games debuted former republics of the Soviet Union: Kazakhstan, Kyrgyzstan, Tajikistan, Turkmenistan, and Uzbekistan.

== Schedule ==
R	Round of 16	¼	Quarterfinals	½	Semifinals	F	Final

Event↓/Date →	4th Tue	5th Wed	6th Thu	7th Fri	8th Sat	9th Sun	10th Mon	11th Tue	12th Wed	13th Thu
Men's 48 kg		R		¼			½			F
Men's 51 kg	R				¼			½		F
Men's 54 kg		R			¼		½			F
Men's 57 kg			R			¼		½		F
Men's 60 kg	R			¼			½			F
Men's 63.5 kg			R			¼		½		F
Men's 67 kg			R		¼		½			F
Men's 71 kg	R					¼		½		F
Men's 75 kg		R		¼			½			F
Men's 81 kg					¼			½		F
Men's 91 kg	R			¼			½			F
Men's +91 kg						¼		½		F

== Medalists ==
Event	Gold	Silver	Bronze
Light flyweight (48 kg)	Mansueto Velasco; Philippines	Pramuansak Phosuwan; Thailand	Birju Shah; India
Light flyweight (48 kg)	Mansueto Velasco; Philippines	Pramuansak Phosuwan; Thailand	Hermensen Ballo; Indonesia
Flyweight (51 kg)	Elias Recaido; Philippines	Kenji Nakazono; Japan	Vichairachanon Khadpo; Thailand
Flyweight (51 kg)	Elias Recaido; Philippines	Kenji Nakazono; Japan	Ali Muhammad Qambrani; Pakistan
Bantamweight (54 kg)	Yeom Jong-kil; South Korea	Abdul Khaliq; Pakistan	Anthony Igusquisa; Philippines
Bantamweight (54 kg)	Yeom Jong-kil; South Korea	Abdul Khaliq; Pakistan	Gurmeet Singh; India
Featherweight (57 kg)	Somluck Kamsing; Thailand	Zaigham Maseel; Pakistan	Eric Canoy; Philippines
Featherweight (57 kg)	Somluck Kamsing; Thailand	Zaigham Maseel; Pakistan	Nemo Bahari; Indonesia
Lightweight (60 kg)	Tsuyoshi Yaegashi; Japan	Chaleo Somwong; Thailand	Jamaan Al-Seghaier; Saudi Arabia
Lightweight (60 kg)	Tsuyoshi Yaegashi; Japan	Chaleo Somwong; Thailand	Bekmyrat Durdyýew; Turkmenistan
Light welterweight (63.5 kg)	Reynaldo Galido; Philippines	Usman Ullah Khan; Pakistan	Pornchai Thongburan; Thailand
Light welterweight (63.5 kg)	Reynaldo Galido; Philippines	Usman Ullah Khan; Pakistan	Bulat Niyazymbetov; Kazakhstan
Welterweight (67 kg)	Nurzhan Smanov; Kazakhstan	Arkhom Chenglai; Thailand	Nariman Ataev; Uzbekistan
Welterweight (67 kg)	Nurzhan Smanov; Kazakhstan	Arkhom Chenglai; Thailand	Anoushiravan Nourian; Iran
Light middleweight (71 kg)	Kanatbek Shagatayev; Kazakhstan	Pan Feng; China	Ghiath Tayfour; Syria
Light middleweight (71 kg)	Kanatbek Shagatayev; Kazakhstan	Pan Feng; China	Suthep Wongsunthorn; Thailand
Middleweight (75 kg)	Lee Seung-bae; South Korea	Arkadiy Topayev; Kazakhstan	Dilshod Yarbekov; Uzbekistan
Middleweight (75 kg)	Lee Seung-bae; South Korea	Arkadiy Topayev; Kazakhstan	Chen Tao; China
Light heavyweight (81 kg)	Ayoub Pourtaghi; Iran	Ko Young-sam; South Korea	Lakha Singh; India
Light heavyweight (81 kg)	Ayoub Pourtaghi; Iran	Ko Young-sam; South Korea	Vassiliy Zhirov; Kazakhstan
Heavyweight (91 kg)	Alisher Avezbaev; Uzbekistan	Yousef Hawsawi; Saudi Arabia	Jiang Tao; China
Heavyweight (91 kg)	Alisher Avezbaev; Uzbekistan	Yousef Hawsawi; Saudi Arabia	Bahman Azizpour; Iran
Super heavyweight (+91 kg)	Oleg Maskaev; Uzbekistan	Mohammad Reza Samadi; Iran	Raj Kumar Sangwan; India
Super heavyweight (+91 kg)	Oleg Maskaev; Uzbekistan	Mohammad Reza Samadi; Iran	Safarish Khan; Pakistan

== Medal table ==
Rank	Nation	Gold	Silver	Bronze	Total
1	Philippines (PHI)	3	0	2	5
2	Kazakhstan (KAZ)	2	1	2	5
3	South Korea (KOR)	2	1	0	3
4	Uzbekistan (UZB)	2	0	2	4
5	Thailand (THA)	1	3	3	7
6	Iran (IRI)	1	1	2	4
7	Japan (JPN)	1	1	0	2
8	Pakistan (PAK)	0	3	2	5
9	China (CHN)	0	1	2	3
10	Saudi Arabia (KSA)	0	1	1	2
11	India (IND)	0	0	4	4
12	Indonesia (INA)	0	0	2	2
13	Syria (SYR)	0	0	1	1
13	Turkmenistan (TKM)	0	0	1	1
Totals (14 entries)		12	12	24	48

== Participating nations ==
A total of 141 athletes from 24 nations competed in boxing at the 1994 Asian Games:

- Afghanistan (1)
- Bangladesh (6)
- Cambodia (2)
- China (6)
- Chinese Taipei (2)
- India (5)
- Indonesia (5)
- Iran (12)
- Japan (9)
- Kazakhstan (9)
- Kyrgyzstan (3)
- Laos (6)
- Mongolia (7)
- Myanmar (2)
- Nepal (7)
- Pakistan (10)
- Philippines (7)
- Saudi Arabia (4)
- South Korea (12)
- Sri Lanka (1)
- Syria (4)
- Thailand (9)
- Turkmenistan (2)
- Uzbekistan (10)
