= Iran at the 1994 Asian Games =

- IOC code: IRI
- NOC: National Olympic Committee of the Islamic Republic of Iran

in Hiroshima
- Competitors: 162 in 15 sports
- Flag bearer: Amir Reza Khadem
- Medals Ranked 6th: Gold 9 Silver 9 Bronze 8 Total 26

Asian Games appearances (overview)
- 1951; 1954; 1958; 1962; 1966; 1970; 1974; 1978; 1982; 1986; 1990; 1994; 1998; 2002; 2006; 2010; 2014; 2018; 2022; 2026

Iran participated in the 1994 Asian Games held in the city of Hiroshima. This country is ranked 6th with 9 gold medals in this edition of the Asiad.

== Competitors ==
Sport	Men	Women	Total
Athletics	10		10
Basketball	12		12
Boxing	12		12
Cycling	6		6
Diving	2		2
Equestrian	9		9
Football	20		20
Judo	7		7
Karate	7		7
Shooting		5	5
Swimming	5		5
Taekwondo	4		4
Tennis	4		4
Volleyball	12		12
Water polo	13		13
Weightlifting	10		10
Wrestling	20		20
Total	153	5	158

== Medal summary ==
=== Medals by sport ===
Sport	Gold	Silver	Bronze	Total
Boxing	1	1	2	4
Equestrian			1	1
Judo		1	1	2
Karate	1	2	1	4
Taekwondo	1	2	1	4
Wrestling	6	3	2	11
Total	9	9	8	26

=== Medalists ===
Medal	Name	Sport	Event
Gold	Ayoub Pourtaghi	Boxing	Men's 81 kg
Gold	Maziar Farid-Khomami	Karate	Men's kumite 70 kg
Gold	Fariborz Askari	Taekwondo	Men's 70 kg
Gold	Nader Rahmati	Wrestling	Men's freestyle 48 kg
Gold	Ali Akbarnejad	Wrestling	Men's freestyle 68 kg
Gold	Behrouz Yari	Wrestling	Men's freestyle 74 kg
Gold	Amir Reza Khadem	Wrestling	Men's freestyle 82 kg
Gold	Rasoul Khadem	Wrestling	Men's freestyle 90 kg
Gold	Ebrahim Mehraban	Wrestling	Men's freestyle 130 kg
Silver	Mohammad Reza Samadi	Boxing	Men's +91 kg
Silver	Mahmoud Miran	Judo	Men's +95 kg
Silver	Arash Javanshir	Karate	Men's kumite 65 kg
Silver	Saeid Ashtian	Karate	Men's kumite 75 kg
Silver	Ebrahim Saadati	Taekwondo	Men's 76 kg
Silver	Farzad Zarakhsh	Taekwondo	Men's +83 kg
Silver	Ayoub Baninosrat	Wrestling	Men's freestyle 100 kg
Silver	Reza Simkhah	Wrestling	Men's Greco-Roman 48 kg
Silver	Hassan Babak	Wrestling	Men's Greco-Roman 90 kg
Bronze	Anoushiravan Nourian	Boxing	Men's 67 kg
Bronze	Bahman Azizpour	Boxing	Men's 91 kg
Bronze	Davoud Bahrami; Ezzat Vojdani; Kazem Vojdani; Shahrokh Moghaddam	Equestrian	Open team jumping
Bronze	Hassan Ahadpour	Judo	Men's 60 kg
Bronze	Vahid Khajeh-Hosseini	Karate	Men's kumite +80 kg
Bronze	Majid Amintorabi	Taekwondo	Men's 83 kg
Bronze	Oveis Mallah	Wrestling	Men's freestyle 57 kg
Bronze	Reza Safaei	Wrestling	Men's freestyle 62 kg

== Results by event ==
=== Aquatics ===
==== Diving ====
Athlete	Event	Preliminary		Final	
Athlete	Event	Score	Rank	Score	Rank
Gholamreza Kheibarinejad	Men's 3 m springboard	302.91	8 Q	434.46	9
Adel Mirabian	Men's 3 m springboard	249.75	11 Q	368.40	11
Adel Mirabian	Men's 10 m platform	272.43	8 Q	351.78	8

==== Water polo ====
Team	Event	Round robin					Rank
Team	Event	Round 1	Round 2	Round 3	Round 4	Round 5	Rank
Iran	Men	Singapore; W 10–6	Japan; L 11–15	China; L 6–10	Kazakhstan; L 6–10	South Korea; W 9–8	4
Roster Coach: (Kazakhstan) Stanislav Pivovarov

=== Athletics ===
Athlete	Event	Round 1		Final	Rank
Athlete	Event	Time	Rank	Time / Result	Rank
Abdolsadegh Gorgani	Men's 100 m	10.71	6	Did not advance	12
Yousef Dehmiri	Men's 200 m	21.29	4 q	21.28	8
Rahman Mardasi	Men's 400 m	47.82	4	Did not advance	10
Gholamreza Sistani	Men's 400 m	46.99	4 q	47.70	7
Malekshir Moradifard	Men's 800 m	1:50.43	4	Did not advance	9
Mohammad Reza Moradpourian	Men's 800 m	1:54.09	5	Did not advance	13
Malekshir Moradifard	Men's 1500 m	—N/a		3:43.49	5
Hamid Sajjadi	Men's 1500 m	—N/a		3:42.37	4
Jafar Babakhani	Men's 5000 m	—N/a		14:14.20	13
Jafar Babakhani	Men's 3000 m steeplechase	—N/a		8:54.37	8
Hamid Sajjadi	Men's 3000 m steeplechase	—N/a		8:37.87	4
Yousef Dehmiri; Rahman Mardasi; Mohammad Reza Moradpourian; Gholamreza Sistani	Men's 4 × 400 m relay	—N/a		3:13.01	7
Hossein Shayan	Men's high jump	—N/a		2.15 m	7
Ali Rahmani	Men's shot put	—N/a		16.03 m	12

=== Basketball ===
Team	Event	Preliminary round					Semifinal	Final	Rank
Team	Event	Round 1	Round 2	Round 3	Round 4	Rank	Semifinal	Final	Rank
Iran	Men	South Korea; L 78–102	Philippines; L 86–89	Kazakhstan; W 69–68	United Arab Emirates; W 88–81	3	5th–8th places Chinese Taipei; L 90–95	7th place match Saudi Arabia; L 87–95	8
Roster: Safa Ali Kamalian; Mehran Shahintab; Mohammad Kasaeipour; Hamid Kashani; Faramarz Pouresfahani; Ali Tofigh; Mehran Hatami; Saeid Khani; Omid Validipak; Hamid Reza Kolasangiani; Mohsen Sadeghzadeh; Mohammad Mehdi Izadpanah; Coach: (Armenia) Vitaly Zastukhov

=== Boxing ===
Athlete	Event	Round of 16	Quarterfinal	Semifinal	Final	Rank
Arman Naghdi	Men's 48 kg	Ballo (INA); L 6–13	Did not advance			9
Babak Asghari	Men's 51 kg	Recaido (PHI); L RSC	Did not advance			9
Bijan Batmani	Men's 54 kg	Igusquisa (PHI); L RSC	Did not advance			9
Mohammad Reza Shaterloo	Men's 57 kg	Bahari (INA); L 7–12	Did not advance			9
Pejman Chalak	Men's 60 kg	Brin (PHI); L 8–13	Did not advance			9
Omid Rashid	Men's 63.5 kg	Nitami (JPN); L RSC	Did not advance			9
Anoushiravan Nourian	Men's 67 kg	Imaoka (JPN); W RSC	Arziev (KGZ); W 10–2	Chenglai (THA); L 17–26	Did not advance	3rd place, bronze medalist(s)
Asadollah Johari	Men's 71 kg	Bye	Pan (CHN); L RSC	Did not advance		5
Siamak Varzideh	Men's 75 kg	Bye	Yarbekov (UZB); L 10–15	Did not advance		5
Ayoub Pourtaghi	Men's 81 kg		Bye	Singh (IND); W 16–9	Ko (KOR); W 9–7	1st place, gold medalist(s)
Bahman Azizpour	Men's 91 kg	Bye	Filipovich (KGZ); W 21–12	Hawsawi (KSA); L 4–6	Did not advance	3rd place, bronze medalist(s)
Mohammad Reza Samadi	Men's +91 kg		Shtorm (KAZ); W 14–7	Khan (PAK); W RSC	Maskaev (UZB); L RSC	2nd place, silver medalist(s)

=== Cycling ===
==== Road ====
Athlete	Event	Time	Rank
Mousa Arbati	Men's road race	Did not finish	—
Hossein Askari	Men's road race	4:52:53	26
Ghader Mizbani	Men's road race	Did not finish	—
Majid Nasseri	Men's road race	Did not finish	—

==== Track ====
Men

Athlete	Event	Rank
Bahram Shafizadeh	1 km time trial	15
Majid Nasseri	4 km individual pursuit	5
Team	4 km team pursuit	6

=== Football ===
Men

Squad list	Preliminary round		Quarterfinal	Semifinal	Final	Rank
Squad list	Group A	Rank	Quarterfinal	Semifinal	Final	Rank
Behzad Gholampour; Javad Zarincheh; Reza Shahroudi; Nader Mohammadkhani; Amir Ghalenoei; Javad Manafi; Sadegh Varmazyar; Jamshid Shahmohammadi; Ali Daei; Farshad Pious; Ali Asghar Modir-Rousta; Behzad Dadashzadeh; Hassan Shirmohammadi; Afshin Peyrovani; Jalal Basharzad; Karim Bagheri; Mohammad Salek-Jabbari; Mojtaba Moharrami; Ali Eftekhari; Iman Alami; Coach: (Croatia) Stanko Poklepović	Bahrain; D 0–0	3	did not advance			9
Behzad Gholampour; Javad Zarincheh; Reza Shahroudi; Nader Mohammadkhani; Amir Ghalenoei; Javad Manafi; Sadegh Varmazyar; Jamshid Shahmohammadi; Ali Daei; Farshad Pious; Ali Asghar Modir-Rousta; Behzad Dadashzadeh; Hassan Shirmohammadi; Afshin Peyrovani; Jalal Basharzad; Karim Bagheri; Mohammad Salek-Jabbari; Mojtaba Moharrami; Ali Eftekhari; Iman Alami; Coach: (Croatia) Stanko Poklepović	Turkmenistan; D 1–1	3	did not advance			9
Behzad Gholampour; Javad Zarincheh; Reza Shahroudi; Nader Mohammadkhani; Amir Ghalenoei; Javad Manafi; Sadegh Varmazyar; Jamshid Shahmohammadi; Ali Daei; Farshad Pious; Ali Asghar Modir-Rousta; Behzad Dadashzadeh; Hassan Shirmohammadi; Afshin Peyrovani; Jalal Basharzad; Karim Bagheri; Mohammad Salek-Jabbari; Mojtaba Moharrami; Ali Eftekhari; Iman Alami; Coach: (Croatia) Stanko Poklepović	China; L 0–1	3	did not advance			9
Behzad Gholampour; Javad Zarincheh; Reza Shahroudi; Nader Mohammadkhani; Amir Ghalenoei; Javad Manafi; Sadegh Varmazyar; Jamshid Shahmohammadi; Ali Daei; Farshad Pious; Ali Asghar Modir-Rousta; Behzad Dadashzadeh; Hassan Shirmohammadi; Afshin Peyrovani; Jalal Basharzad; Karim Bagheri; Mohammad Salek-Jabbari; Mojtaba Moharrami; Ali Eftekhari; Iman Alami; Coach: (Croatia) Stanko Poklepović	Yemen; W 4–0	3	did not advance			9

=== Karate ===
Kata

Athlete	Event	Score	Rank
Alaeddin Nekoufar	Men's individual	46.6	4

Kumite

Athlete	Event	Round of 16	Quarterfinal	Semifinal	Final	Rank
Mehdi Amouzadeh	Men's 60 kg	Yamamoto (JPN); L	Did not advance			9
Arash Javanshir	Men's 65 kg	? (HKG); W	Terada (JPN); W	Lay (PHI); W 3–2	Al-Karad (SYR); L 1–3	2nd place, silver medalist(s)
Maziar Farid-Khomami	Men's 70 kg	? (VIE); W 2–0	Mariano (PHI); W 6–0	Ghalaita (UAE); W 6–0	Al-Mejadi (KUW); W 4–3	1st place, gold medalist(s)
Saeid Ashtian	Men's 75 kg	? (TJK); W	Chan (HKG); W	Al-Khaledi (KUW); W 2–0	Shiina (JPN); L	2nd place, silver medalist(s)
Benyamin Najibi Baher	Men's 80 kg	Al-Sabbagh (KUW); L	Did not advance			9
Vahid Khajeh-Hosseini	Men's +80 kg	? (NEP); W	Lashkari (UAE); W	Shimizu (JPN); L 3–5	Did not advance	3rd place, bronze medalist(s)

=== Shooting ===
Athlete	Event	Qualification		Final			Team events			
Athlete	Event	Score	Rank	Score	Total	Rank	Athlete	Event	Score	Rank
Lida Fariman	Women's 10 m air rifle	379	17	Did not advance			Lida Fariman; Elham Hashemi; Leila Taghipour	Women's 10 m air rifle team	1128	7
Elham Hashemi	Women's 10 m air rifle	368	26	Did not advance			Lida Fariman; Elham Hashemi; Leila Taghipour	Women's 10 m air rifle team	1128	7
Leila Taghipour	Women's 10 m air rifle	381	16	Did not advance			Lida Fariman; Elham Hashemi; Leila Taghipour	Women's 10 m air rifle team	1128	7
Elham Hashemi	Women's 50 m rifle prone	572	22	—N/a			Elham Hashemi; Zahra Mahroughi; Leila Vaseghi	Women's 50 m rifle prone team	1725	6
Zahra Mahroughi	Women's 50 m rifle prone	582	9	—N/a			Elham Hashemi; Zahra Mahroughi; Leila Vaseghi	Women's 50 m rifle prone team	1725	6
Leila Vaseghi	Women's 50 m rifle prone	571	26	—N/a			Elham Hashemi; Zahra Mahroughi; Leila Vaseghi	Women's 50 m rifle prone team	1725	6

=== Taekwondo ===
Athlete	Event	Round of 16	Quarterfinal	Semifinal	Final	Rank
Fariborz Askari	Men's 70 kg	Al-Jammaz (KSA); W 2–0	Vũ (VIE); W 2–1	Abu Zaid (JOR); W 5–1	Yamashita (JPN); W 6–2	1st place, gold medalist(s)
Ebrahim Saadati	Men's 76 kg	Bye	Kuznetsov (UZB); W WO	Arita (JPN); W 2–0	Jung (KOR); L 1–2	2nd place, silver medalist(s)
Majid Amintorabi	Men's 83 kg	Bye	Polsomboon (THA); W 2–0	Gholoum (KUW); L	Did not advance	3rd place, bronze medalist(s)
Farzad Zarakhsh	Men's +83 kg	—N/a	Bye	Nwaiser (JOR); W	Kim (KOR); L	2nd place, silver medalist(s)

=== Tennis ===
Athlete	Event	Round of 32	Round of 16	Quarterfinal	Semifinal	Final	Rank
Ramin Raziani	Men's singles	Ramachandran (MAS); L 1–2 (7–6, 6–7, 3–6)	Did not advance				17
Jahanbakhsh Souri	Men's singles	Natekar (IND); L 0–2 (3–6, 3–6)	Did not advance				17
Ramin Raziani; Mostafa Saleh; Jahanbakhsh Souri; Mohammad Reza Tavakkoli	Men's team	—N/a	Chinese Taipei; L 0–3 (0–2, 0–2, 0–2)	Did not advance			9

=== Volleyball ===
Team	Event	Preliminary round				Second round			Semifinal	Final	Rank
Team	Event	Round 1 & 4	Round 2 & 5	Round 3 & 6	Rank	Round 1	Round 2	Rank	Semifinal	Final	Rank
Iran	Men	Pakistan; W 3–2 (9–15, 14–16, 15–7, 15–6, 15–13) W 3–2 (17–15, 9–15, 13–15, 15–8, 15–10)	Mongolia; W 3–0 (15–0, 15–5, 15–3) W 3–0 (15–13, 15–6, 15–7)	Kazakhstan; L 0–3 (7–15, 6–15, 15–17) L 0–3 (8–15, 8–15, 6–15)	2 Q	Kazakhstan; L 1–3 (15–12, 9–15, 7–15, 5–15)	South Korea; L 0–3 (3–15, 6–15, 3–15)	3	Did not advance	5th place match Pakistan; W 3–0 (15–12, 15–8, 15–2)	5
Roster: Mohammad Reza Damghani; Mohammad Hossein Nejati; Babak Mozaffari; Farid Akhondzadeh; Hossein Maadani; Mohammad Omdeh-Ghiasi; Reza Shahabi; Mohammad Sadegh Shaban-Khamseh; Mirmostafa Shojaei; Ahmad Lahouti; Sasan Khodaparast; Iraj Mozaffari; Coach: (Japan) Fumihiko Matsumoto

=== Weightlifting ===
Athlete	Event	Snatch		Clean & Jerk		Total	
Athlete	Event	Result	Rank	Result	Rank	Result	Rank
Esmaeil Taghipour	Men's 76 kg	135.0	6	170.0	5	305.0	6
Bahman Zare Majd	Men's 76 kg	145.0	3	165.0	6	310.0	5
Abbas Talebi	Men's 83 kg	150.0	5	180.0	6	330.0	6
Ali Biglari	Men's 91 kg	150.0	6	180.0	8	330.0	8
Mirmahmoud Hakemzadeh	Men's 91 kg	162.5	3	195.0	4	357.5	4
Raeis Ali Hatami	Men's 99 kg	160.0	5	195.0	5	355.0	5
Mozaffar Ajali	Men's 108 kg	NM	—	—	—	—	—
Ali Jabbari	Men's 108 kg	155.0	6	180.0	6	335.0	6
Sadegh Delkhosh	Men's +108 kg	150.0	8	185.0	7	335.0	7
Ramezan Ali Teymouri	Men's +108 kg	185.0	2	NM	—	—	—

=== Wrestling ===
Freestyle

Athlete	Event	Elimination round				Final	Rank
Athlete	Event	Round 1	Elimination	Semifinal	Repechage	Final	Rank
Nader Rahmati	Men's 48 kg	Moon (KOR); W 5–4	Falsario (PHI); W 10–0	Kumar (IND); W 5–0	Bye	Züünbayan (MGL); W 8–0	1st place, gold medalist(s)
Gholamreza Mohammadi	Men's 52 kg	Sasayama (JPN); W 3–0	Bye	Dun (CHN); L 4–5	Repechage; Kim (KOR); W 2–1	3rd place match Donbaev (KGZ); L 1–1	4
Oveis Mallah	Men's 57 kg	Kim (KOR); W 1–1	Kui (CHN); W 5–3	Tsogtbayar (MGL); L 4–5	Repechage; Zupparov (UZB); W 3–2	3rd place match Kim (KOR); W 5–2	3rd place, bronze medalist(s)
Reza Safaei	Men's 62 kg	Bayarsaikhan (MGL); L 4–5	Repechage; Islamov (UZB); W 5–4	Repechage; Nguyễn (VIE); W 10–0	Repechage; Yu (CHN); W 4–2	3rd place match Madjinov (KGZ); W 4–1	3rd place, bronze medalist(s)
Ali Akbarnejad	Men's 68 kg	Jam (AFG); W 11–0	—N/a	Omuraliev (KGZ); W 1–0	Bye	Katsu (JPN); W 3–0	1st place, gold medalist(s)
Behrouz Yari	Men's 74 kg	Fayaz (PAK); W 11–0	—N/a	Park (KOR); W 3–0	Bye	Ota (JPN); W 2–0	1st place, gold medalist(s)
Amir Reza Khadem	Men's 82 kg	Yokoyama (JPN); W 3–0	—N/a	Yang (KOR); W 2–1	Bye	Zhabrailov (KAZ); W 2–2	1st place, gold medalist(s)
Rasoul Khadem	Men's 90 kg	Amein (AFG); W 3–0	Sükhbat (MGL); W 5–0	Bayramukov (KAZ); W 8–0	Bye	Ito (JPN); W 5–0	1st place, gold medalist(s)
Ayoub Baninosrat	Men's 100 kg	Asanuma (JPN); W 9–0	—N/a	Habibullah (AFG); W Fall (4–0)	Bye	Kim (KOR); L 1–2	2nd place, silver medalist(s)
Ebrahim Mehraban	Men's 130 kg	Kim (KOR); W 9–1	—N/a	Obata (JPN); W 3–0	Bye	Klimov (KAZ); W 5–3	1st place, gold medalist(s)

Greco-Roman

Athlete	Event	Elimination round				Final	Rank
Athlete	Event	Round 1	Elimination	Semifinal	Repechage	Final	Rank
Reza Simkhah	Men's 48 kg	Hu (CHN); W 12–1	Bye	Yusuf (INA); W 10–0	Bye	Sim (KOR); L 0–7	2nd place, silver medalist(s)
Abdolkarim Kakahaji	Men's 52 kg	Al-Faraj (SYR); L 0–12	Bye	Repechage (INA); W	Repechage; Han (CHN); L Fall (7–2)	5th place match Nakamori (JPN); L 1–5	6
Shahriar Salehi	Men's 57 kg	Sheng (CHN); L 1–4	—N/a	Repechage; Guhiting (PHI); W	Repechage; Al-Sobai (SYR); W	3rd place match Lee (KOR); L 0–3	4
Ahad Pazaj	Men's 62 kg	Bye	Choi (KOR); L 2–3	Did not advance			7
Mehdi Sadeghpour	Men's 68 kg	Kim (KOR); L 4–5	—N/a	Repechage; Shah (AFG); W	Repechage; Al-Osta (SYR); W	3rd place match Mori (JPN); L 1–3	4
Ahad Javansalehi	Men's 74 kg	Bye	—N/a	Han (KOR); L	Bye	3rd place match Katayama (JPN); L 5–6	4
Arash Motamedi	Men's 82 kg	Bye	—N/a	Turlykhanov (KAZ); L 0–5	Repechage; Mukai (JPN); W 6–3	3rd place match Kim (KOR); L 3–5	4
Hassan Babak	Men's 90 kg	Bye	—N/a	Zayar (SYR); W	Bye	Eom (KOR); L 1–4	2nd place, silver medalist(s)
Jaber Abbaszadeh	Men's 100 kg	Bye	—N/a	Song (KOR); L 2–6	Repechage; Keniaev (UZB); W	3rd place match Nonomura (JPN); L 2–2	4
Abdollah Azizi	Men's 130 kg	Bye	—N/a	Suzuki (JPN); L 0–3	Repechage; Kashour (SYR); W	3rd place match Hu (CHN); L 0–4	4
