= Boxing at the 1994 Asian Games – Men's 54 kg =

Boxing competitions

Men's 54 kg at the 1994 Asian Games
- Venue: Naka Ward Sports Center
- Date: 5–13 October 1994
- Competitors: 16 from 16 nations

Medalists
gold medal	Yeom Jong-kil	South Korea
silver medal	Abdul Khaliq	Pakistan
bronze medal	Anthony Igusquisa	Philippines
bronze medal	Gurmeet Singh	India

The men's bantamweight boxing competition at the 1994 Asian Games in Hiroshima, Japan was held from 5 to 13 October 1994 at Naka Ward Sports Center.

The boxers receive points for every successful punch they land on their opponent's head or upper body. The boxer with the most points at the end of the bouts wins. If a boxer is knocked to the ground and cannot get up before the referee counts to 10 then the bout is over and the opponent wins.

== Schedule ==
All times are Japan Standard Time (UTC+09:00)

Date	Time	Event
Wednesday, 5 October 1994	15:00	1st round
Saturday, 8 October 1994	15:00	Quarterfinals
Monday, 10 October 1994	17:00	Semifinals
Thursday, 13 October 1994	14:00	Final

== Results ==
Legend

- RSC — Won by referee stop contest

1st round
Ko Wen-ming (TPE)	0
Umesh Katuwal (NEP)	7
Yeom Jong-kil (KOR)	13
Shan Xiaoqiang (CHN)	3
Bektas Abubakirov (KAZ)	13
Motochika Aharen (JPN)	4
Anthony Igusquisa (PHI)	RSC
Bijan Batmani (IRI)
Tseyen-Oidovyn Davaatseren (MGL)	11
Littidech Kerdpayak (THA)	7
Gurmeet Singh (IND)	30
Aslam Hussain (BAN)	1
Uygun Siddikov (UZB)	6
Abdul Khaliq (PAK)	10
Souksavane Sengthavisouk (LAO)	7
Nilantha Walisundera (SRI)	8

Quarterfinals
Umesh Katuwal (NEP)	0
Yeom Jong-kil (KOR)	15
Bektas Abubakirov (KAZ)	5
Anthony Igusquisa (PHI)	12
Tseyen-Oidovyn Davaatseren (MGL)	4
Gurmeet Singh (IND)	11
Abdul Khaliq (PAK)	20
Nilantha Walisundera (SRI)	3

Semifinals
Yeom Jong-kil (KOR)	8
Anthony Igusquisa (PHI)	5
Gurmeet Singh (IND)	5
Abdul Khaliq (PAK)	22

Final
Yeom Jong-kil (KOR)	10
Abdul Khaliq (PAK)	6
