= Boxing at the 1994 Asian Games – Men's 48 kg =

Boxing competitions

Men's 48 kg at the 1994 Asian Games
- Venue: Naka Ward Sports Center
- Date: 5–13 October 1994
- Competitors: 14 from 14 nations

Medalists
gold medal	Mansueto Velasco	Philippines
silver medal	Pramuansak Phosuwan	Thailand
bronze medal	Birju Shah	India
bronze medal	Hermensen Ballo	Indonesia

The men's light flyweight boxing competition at the 1994 Asian Games in Hiroshima, Japan was held from 5 to 13 October 1994 at Naka Ward Sports Center.

The boxers receive points for every successful punch they land on their opponent's head or upper body. The boxer with the most points at the end of the bouts wins. If a boxer is knocked to the ground and cannot get up before the referee counts to 10 then the bout is over and the opponent wins.

== Schedule ==
All times are Japan Standard Time (UTC+09:00)

Date	Time	Event
Wednesday, 5 October 1994	15:00	1st round
Friday, 7 October 1994	15:00	Quarterfinals
Monday, 10 October 1994	17:00	Semifinals
Thursday, 13 October 1994	14:00	Final

== Results ==
Legend

- KO — Won by knockout
- RSC — Won by referee stop contest

1st round
Bulat Zhumadilov (KAZ)	20
Cha Kwan-chul (KOR)	3
Pramuansak Phosuwan (THA)	14
Kamsaynoy (LAO)	1
Vanna Thim (CAM)
Mansueto Velasco (PHI)	KO
Ruhul Amin (BAN)
Abdul Rashid Qambrani (PAK)	RSC
Hermensen Ballo (INA)	13
Arman Naghdi (IRI)	6
Erdenotsogtyn Tsogtjargal (MGL)	6
Kazumasa Tsujimoto (JPN)	16

Quarterfinals
Birju Shah (IND)	14
Om Kumar Maskey (NEP)	5
Bulat Zhumadilov (KAZ)	3
Pramuansak Phosuwan (THA)	7
Mansueto Velasco (PHI)	14
Abdul Rashid Qambrani (PAK)	8
Hermensen Ballo (INA)	11
Kazumasa Tsujimoto (JPN)	10

Semifinals
Birju Shah (IND)	7
Pramuansak Phosuwan (THA)	8
Mansueto Velasco (PHI)	15
Hermensen Ballo (INA)	6

Final
Pramuansak Phosuwan (THA)	9
Mansueto Velasco (PHI)	11
