= Boxing at the 1994 Asian Games – Men's 57 kg =

Boxing competitions

Men's 57 kg at the 1994 Asian Games
- Venue: Naka Ward Sports Center
- Date: 6–13 October 1994
- Competitors: 15 from 15 nations

Medalists
gold medal	Somluck Kamsing	Thailand
silver medal	Zaigham Maseel	Pakistan
bronze medal	Eric Canoy	Philippines
bronze medal	Nemo Bahari	Indonesia

The men's featherweight boxing competition at the 1994 Asian Games in Hiroshima, Japan was held from 6 to 13 October 1994 at Naka Ward Sports Center.

The boxers receive points for every successful punch they land on their opponent's head or upper body. The boxer with the most points at the end of the bouts wins. If a boxer is knocked to the ground and cannot get up before the referee counts to 10 then the bout is over and the opponent wins.

== Schedule ==
All times are Japan Standard Time (UTC+09:00)

Date	Time	Event
Thursday, 6 October 1994	15:00	1st round
Sunday, 9 October 1994	15:00	Quarterfinals
Tuesday, 11 October 1994	17:00	Semifinals
Thursday, 13 October 1994	14:00	Final

== Results ==
Legend

- RSC — Won by referee stop contest

1st round
Bounleuth Phimphanonh (LAO)
Zaigham Maseel (PAK)	RSC
Venkatesan Devarajan (IND)	20
Dugarbaataryn Lkhagva (MGL)	11
Keisuke Ikehata (JPN)	7
Eric Canoy (PHI)	15
Somluck Kamsing (THA)	13
Kyaw Min (MYA)	0
Muhammad Abdullaev (UZB)	RSC
Makki Zayed (KSA)
Nemo Bahari (INA)	12
Mohammad Reza Shaterloo (IRI)	7
Kang Sung-oh (KOR)	16
Suresh Malla Thakuri (NEP)	4

Quarterfinals
Zhou Renzhi (CHN)	6
Zaigham Maseel (PAK)	13
Venkatesan Devarajan (IND)	7
Eric Canoy (PHI)	10
Somluck Kamsing (THA)	9
Muhammad Abdullaev (UZB)	3
Nemo Bahari (INA)	11
Kang Sung-oh (KOR)	2

Semifinals
Zaigham Maseel (PAK)	28
Eric Canoy (PHI)	24
Somluck Kamsing (THA)	12
Nemo Bahari (INA)	6

Final
Zaigham Maseel (PAK)	5
Somluck Kamsing (THA)	8
