= Boxing at the 1994 Asian Games – Men's 67 kg =

Boxing competitions

Men's 67 kg at the 1994 Asian Games
- Venue: Naka Ward Sports Center
- Date: 6–13 October 1994
- Competitors: 14 from 14 nations

Medalists
| gold medal | Nurzhan Smanov | Kazakhstan |
| silver medal | Arkhom Chenglai | Thailand |
| bronze medal | Nariman Ataev | Uzbekistan |
| bronze medal | Anoushiravan Nourian | Iran |

The men's welterweight boxing competition at the 1994 Asian Games in Hiroshima, Japan was held from 6 to 13 October 1994 at Naka Ward Sports Center.

The boxers receive points for every successful punch they land on their opponent's head or upper body. The boxer with the most points at the end of the bouts wins. If a boxer is knocked to the ground and cannot get up before the referee counts to 10 then the bout is over and the opponent wins.

== Schedule ==
All times are Japan Standard Time (UTC+09:00)

| Date | Time | Event |
|---|---|---|
| Thursday, 6 October 1994 | 15:00 | 1st round |
| Saturday, 8 October 1994 | 15:00 | Quarterfinals |
| Monday, 10 October 1994 | 17:00 | Semifinals |
| Thursday, 13 October 1994 | 14:00 | Final |

== Results ==
Legend

- RSC — Won by referee stop contest

1st round
Nariman Ataev (UZB) | RSC
Delwar Hossain (BAN)
Arlo Chavez (PHI) | RSC
Prakash Thapa Magar (NEP)
Arkhom Chenglai (THA) | 12
Gao Ming (CHN) | 5
Lee Hoon (KOR) | 15
Khaled Al-Karad (SYR) | 3
Noriyuki Imaoka (JPN)
Anoushiravan Nourian (IRI) | RSC
Abdul Rasheed Baloch (PAK)
Nurgazy Arziev (KGZ) | RSC

Quarterfinals
Nurzhan Smanov (KAZ) | 16
Nuretdin Atakow (TKM) | 6
Nariman Ataev (UZB) | 9
Arlo Chavez (PHI) | 6
Arkhom Chenglai (THA) | 12
Lee Hoon (KOR) | 8
Anoushiravan Nourian (IRI) | 10
Nurgazy Arziev (KGZ) | 2

Semifinals
Nurzhan Smanov (KAZ) | 17
Nariman Ataev (UZB) | 15
Arkhom Chenglai (THA) | 26
Anoushiravan Nourian (IRI) | 17

Final
Nurzhan Smanov (KAZ) | RSC
Arkhom Chenglai (THA)
