= Boxing at the 1994 Asian Games – Men's 75 kg =

Boxing competitions

Men's 75 kg at the 1994 Asian Games
- Venue: Naka Ward Sports Center
- Date: 5–13 October 1994
- Competitors: 10 from 10 nations

Medalists
gold medal	Lee Seung-bae	South Korea
silver medal	Arkadiy Topayev	Kazakhstan
bronze medal	Dilshod Yarbekov	Uzbekistan
bronze medal	Chen Tao	China

The men's middleweight boxing competition at the 1994 Asian Games in Hiroshima, Japan was held from 5 to 13 October 1994 at Naka Ward Sports Center.

The boxers receive points for every successful punch they land on their opponent's head or upper body. The boxer with the most points at the end of the bouts wins. If a boxer is knocked to the ground and cannot get up before the referee counts to 10 then the bout is over and the opponent wins.

== Schedule ==
All times are Japan Standard Time (UTC+09:00)

Date	Time	Event
Wednesday, 5 October 1994	15:00	1st round
Friday, 7 October 1994	15:00	Quarterfinals
Monday, 10 October 1994	17:00	Semifinals
Thursday, 13 October 1994	14:00	Final

== Results ==
Legend

- RSC — Won by referee stop contest

1st round
Pino Bahari (INA)	15
Narong Inphrom (THA)	8
Arkadiy Topayev (KAZ)	RSC
Harunur Rashid (BAN)

Quarterfinals
Lee Seung-bae (KOR)	15
Hirokuni Moto (JPN)	10
Siamak Varzideh (IRI)	10
Dilshod Yarbekov (UZB)	15
Adnan Kaddour (SYR)
Chen Tao (CHN)	RSC
Pino Bahari (INA)	6
Arkadiy Topayev (KAZ)	11

Semifinals
Lee Seung-bae (KOR)	15
Dilshod Yarbekov (UZB)	5
Chen Tao (CHN)	11
Arkadiy Topayev (KAZ)	17

Final
Lee Seung-bae (KOR)	10
Arkadiy Topayev (KAZ)	7
