= Boxing at the 1994 Asian Games – Men's 63.5 kg =

Boxing competitions

Men's 63.5 kg at the 1994 Asian Games
- Venue: Naka Ward Sports Center
- Date: 6–13 October 1994
- Competitors: 11 from 11 nations

Medalists
gold medal	Reynaldo Galido	Philippines
silver medal	Usman Ullah Khan	Pakistan
bronze medal	Pornchai Thongburan	Thailand
bronze medal	Bulat Niyazymbetov	Kazakhstan

The men's light welterweight boxing competition at the 1994 Asian Games in Hiroshima, Japan was held from 6 to 13 October 1994 at Naka Ward Sports Center.

The boxers receive points for every successful punch they land on their opponent's head or upper body. The boxer with the most points at the end of the bouts wins. If a boxer is knocked to the ground and cannot get up before the referee counts to 10 then the bout is over and the opponent wins.

== Schedule ==
All times are Japan Standard Time (UTC+09:00)

Date	Time	Event
Thursday, 6 October 1994	15:00	1st round
Sunday, 9 October 1994	15:00	Quarterfinals
Tuesday, 11 October 1994	17:00	Semifinals
Thursday, 13 October 1994	14:00	Final

== Results ==
Legend

- RSC — Won by referee stop contest
- WO — Won by walkover

1st round
J. Al-Dossari (KSA)
Usman Ullah Khan (PAK)	RSC
Fumitaka Nitami (JPN)	RSC
Omid Rashid (IRI)
Bulat Niyazymbetov (KAZ)	9
Hong Sung-sik (KOR)	2

Quarterfinals
Farkhad Bakirov (UZB)	4
Reynaldo Galido (PHI)	17
Khamtay Daomanivone (LAO)
Pornchai Thongburan (THA)	RSC
Densmaagiin Enkhsaikhan (MGL)	6
Usman Ullah Khan (PAK)	10
Fumitaka Nitami (JPN)	8
Bulat Niyazymbetov (KAZ)	11

Semifinals
Reynaldo Galido (PHI)	13
Pornchai Thongburan (THA)	8
Usman Ullah Khan (PAK)	WO
Bulat Niyazymbetov (KAZ)

Final
Reynaldo Galido (PHI)	RSC
Usman Ullah Khan (PAK)
