= 1995 Asian Amateur Boxing Championships =

Boxing competitions

1995 Asian Boxing Championships
- Host city: Tashkent, Uzbekistan
- Dates: 1–8 October 1995

The 18th edition of the Men's Asian Amateur Boxing Championships were held from October 1 to October 8, 1995, in Tashkent, Uzbekistan.

== Medal summary ==
Event	Gold	Silver	Bronze
Light flyweight 48 kg	Somrot Kamsing; Thailand	Mansueto Velasco; Philippines	Yang Xiangzhong; China
Light flyweight 48 kg	Somrot Kamsing; Thailand	Mansueto Velasco; Philippines	Choi Yoon-wook; South Korea
Flyweight; 51 kg	Bulat Zhumadilov; Kazakhstan	Pramuansak Phosuwan; Thailand	Kenji Nakazono; Japan
Flyweight; 51 kg	Bulat Zhumadilov; Kazakhstan	Pramuansak Phosuwan; Thailand	Lee Jang-sun; South Korea
Bantamweight; 54 kg	Bektas Abubakirov; Kazakhstan	Khurshed Khasanov; Tajikistan	Bae Ki-woong; South Korea
Bantamweight; 54 kg	Bektas Abubakirov; Kazakhstan	Khurshed Khasanov; Tajikistan	Timur Tulyakov; Uzbekistan
Featherweight; 57 kg	Bakhtiyar Tolegenov; Kazakhstan	Nemo Bahari; Indonesia	Vicente Galido; Philippines
Featherweight; 57 kg	Bakhtiyar Tolegenov; Kazakhstan	Nemo Bahari; Indonesia	Janibek Kaptagayev; Kyrgyzstan
Lightweight; 60 kg	Tümentsetsegiin Üitümen; Mongolia	Muhammad Abdullaev; Uzbekistan	Romeo Brin; Philippines
Lightweight; 60 kg	Tümentsetsegiin Üitümen; Mongolia	Muhammad Abdullaev; Uzbekistan	Yan Jiangning; China
Light welterweight 63.5 kg	Bulat Niyazymbetov; Kazakhstan	Reynaldo Galido; Philippines	Channamak Chaichumpul; Thailand
Light welterweight 63.5 kg	Bulat Niyazymbetov; Kazakhstan	Reynaldo Galido; Philippines	Omid Rashid; Iran
Welterweight; 67 kg	Nariman Ataev; Uzbekistan	Nurzhan Smanov; Kazakhstan	Nuretdin Atakow; Turkmenistan
Welterweight; 67 kg	Nariman Ataev; Uzbekistan	Nurzhan Smanov; Kazakhstan	Tsoodolyn Batnasan; Mongolia
Light middleweight 71 kg	Yermakhan Ibraimov; Kazakhstan	Jawid Aman; Afghanistan	Wang Chung-yuan; Chinese Taipei
Light middleweight 71 kg	Yermakhan Ibraimov; Kazakhstan	Jawid Aman; Afghanistan	Karim Tulaganov; Uzbekistan
Middleweight; 75 kg	Dilshod Yarbekov; Uzbekistan	Kourosh Molaei; Iran	Pan Dianjun; China
Middleweight; 75 kg	Dilshod Yarbekov; Uzbekistan	Kourosh Molaei; Iran	Lee In-soo; South Korea
Light heavyweight 81 kg	Vassiliy Zhirov; Kazakhstan	Lee Seung-bae; South Korea	Ayoub Pourtaghi; Iran
Light heavyweight 81 kg	Vassiliy Zhirov; Kazakhstan	Lee Seung-bae; South Korea	Zhao Yong; China
Heavyweight; 91 kg	Ruslan Chagaev; Uzbekistan	Lakha Singh; India	Bahadir Sadikow; Turkmenistan
Heavyweight; 91 kg	Ruslan Chagaev; Uzbekistan	Lakha Singh; India	Bahman Azizpour; Iran
Super heavyweight +91 kg	Mohammad Reza Samadi; Iran	Lazizbek Zokirov; Tajikistan	Baik Hyun-man; South Korea
Super heavyweight +91 kg	Mohammad Reza Samadi; Iran	Lazizbek Zokirov; Tajikistan	Safarish Khan; Pakistan

== Medal table ==
Rank	Nation	Gold	Silver	Bronze	Total
1	Kazakhstan	6	1	0	7
2	Uzbekistan	3	1	2	6
3	Iran	1	1	3	5
4	Thailand	1	1	1	3
5	Mongolia	1	0	1	2
6	Philippines	0	2	2	4
7	Tajikistan	0	2	0	2
8	South Korea	0	1	5	6
9	Afghanistan	0	1	0	1
9	India	0	1	0	1
9	Indonesia	0	1	0	1
12	China	0	0	4	4
13	Turkmenistan	0	0	2	2
14	Chinese Taipei	0	0	1	1
14	Japan	0	0	1	1
14	Kyrgyzstan	0	0	1	1
14	Pakistan	0	0	1	1
Totals (17 entries)		12	12	24	48
