= Boxing at the 1994 Asian Games – Men's 81 kg =

Boxing competitions

Men's 81 kg at the 1994 Asian Games
- Venue: Naka Ward Sports Center
- Date: 8–13 October 1994
- Competitors: 7 from 7 nations

Medalists
gold medal	Ayoub Pourtaghi	Iran
silver medal	Ko Young-sam	South Korea
bronze medal	Lakha Singh	India
bronze medal	Vassiliy Zhirov	Kazakhstan

The men's light heavyweight boxing competition at the 1994 Asian Games in Hiroshima, Japan was held from 8 to 13 October 1994 at Naka Ward Sports Center.

The boxers receive points for every successful punch they land on their opponent's head or upper body. The boxer with the most points at the end of the bouts wins. If a boxer is knocked to the ground and cannot get up before the referee counts to 10 then the bout is over and the opponent wins.

== Schedule ==
All times are Japan Standard Time (UTC+09:00)

Date	Time	Event
Saturday, 8 October 1994	15:00	Quarterfinals
Tuesday, 11 October 1994	17:00	Semifinals
Thursday, 13 October 1994	14:00	Final

== Results ==
Legend

- RSC — Won by referee stop contest

Quarterfinals
Timur Ibragimov (UZB)	4
Lakha Singh (IND)	8
Vassiliy Zhirov (KAZ)	RSC
Asghar Ali Changezi (PAK)
Ko Young-sam (KOR)	22
Chitra Bahadur Gurung (NEP)	3

Semifinals
Ayoub Pourtaghi (IRI)	16
Lakha Singh (IND)	9
Vassiliy Zhirov (KAZ)	10
Ko Young-sam (KOR)	17

Final
Ayoub Pourtaghi (IRI)	9
Ko Young-sam (KOR)	7
