= Boxing at the 1994 Asian Games – Men's 51 kg =

Boxing competitions

Men's 51 kg at the 1994 Asian Games
- Venue: Naka Ward Sports Center
- Date: 4–13 October 1994
- Competitors: 15 from 15 nations

Medalists
| gold medal | Elias Recaido | Philippines |
| silver medal | Kenji Nakazono | Japan |
| bronze medal | Vichairachanon Khadpo | Thailand |
| bronze medal | Ali Muhammad Qambrani | Pakistan |

The men's flyweight boxing competition at the 1994 Asian Games in Hiroshima, Japan was held from 4 to 13 October 1994 at Naka Ward Sports Center.

The boxers receive points for every successful punch they land on their opponent's head or upper body. The boxer with the most points at the end of the bouts wins. If a boxer is knocked to the ground and cannot get up before the referee counts to 10 then the bout is over and the opponent wins.

== Schedule ==
All times are Japan Standard Time (UTC+09:00)

| Date | Time | Event |
|---|---|---|
| Tuesday, 4 October 1994 | 15:00 | 1st round |
| Saturday, 8 October 1994 | 15:00 | Quarterfinals |
| Tuesday, 11 October 1994 | 17:00 | Semifinals |
| Thursday, 13 October 1994 | 14:00 | Final |

== Results ==
Legend

- RSC — Won by referee stop contest

1st round
Hsu Jen-mao (TPE) | 3
San Hla Lay (MYA) | 8
Taalaibek Kadiraliev (KGZ) | 2
Shin Dong-kil (KOR) | 12
Kenji Nakazono (JPN) | 19
Phouthone Soulavanh (LAO) | 1
Ali Muhammad Qambrani (PAK) | 17
Kazi Shahadat Hossain (BAN) | 14
Khikmatulla Akhmedov (UZB) | 7
Rachman Kili Kili (INA) | 2
Elias Recaido (PHI) | RSC
Babak Asghari (IRI)
Touch Kosal (CAM) | 4
Bishnu Bahadur Singh (NEP) | 7

Quarterfinals
Vichairachanon Khadpo (THA) | 9
San Hla Lay (MYA) | 1
Shin Dong-kil (KOR) | 11
Kenji Nakazono (JPN) | 16
Ali Muhammad Qambrani (PAK) | 15
Khikmatulla Akhmedov (UZB) | 9
Elias Recaido (PHI) | RSC
Bishnu Bahadur Singh (NEP)

Semifinals
Vichairachanon Khadpo (THA) | 6
Kenji Nakazono (JPN) | 9
Ali Muhammad Qambrani (PAK) | 14
Elias Recaido (PHI) | 15

Final
Kenji Nakazono (JPN) | 8
Elias Recaido (PHI) | 16
