= Boxing at the 1994 Asian Games – Men's 71 kg =

Boxing competitions

Men's 71 kg at the 1994 Asian Games
- Venue: Naka Ward Sports Center
- Date: 4–13 October 1994
- Competitors: 10 from 10 nations

Medalists
gold medal	Kanatbek Shagatayev	Kazakhstan
silver medal	Pan Feng	China
bronze medal	Ghiath Tayfour	Syria
bronze medal	Suthep Wongsunthorn	Thailand

The men's light middleweight boxing competition at the 1994 Asian Games in Hiroshima, Japan was held from 4 to 13 October 1994 at Naka Ward Sports Center.

The boxers receive points for every successful punch they land on their opponent's head or upper body. The boxer with the most points at the end of the bouts wins. If a boxer is knocked to the ground and cannot get up before the referee counts to 10 then the bout is over and the opponent wins.

== Schedule ==
All times are Japan Standard Time (UTC+09:00)

Date	Time	Event
Tuesday, 4 October 1994	15:00	1st round
Sunday, 9 October 1994	15:00	Quarterfinals
Tuesday, 11 October 1994	17:00	Semifinals
Thursday, 13 October 1994	14:00	Final

== Results ==
Legend

- RSC — Won by referee stop contest

1st round
Kanatbek Shagatayev (KAZ)	8
Muhammad Tanveer Butt (PAK)	4
Hiromi Amada (JPN)	4
Ikrom Berdiev (UZB)	12

Quarterfinals
Pan Feng (CHN)	RSC
Asadollah Johari (IRI)
Yoon Yong-chan (KOR)
Ghiath Tayfour (SYR)	RSC
Suthep Wongsunthorn (THA)	10
Byadaajavyn Bat-Orshikh (MGL)	1
Kanatbek Shagatayev (KAZ)	RSC
Ikrom Berdiev (UZB)

Semifinals
Pan Feng (CHN)	13
Ghiath Tayfour (SYR)	6
Suthep Wongsunthorn (THA)
Kanatbek Shagatayev (KAZ)	RSC

Final
Pan Feng (CHN)	7
Kanatbek Shagatayev (KAZ)	10
