= Synchronized swimming at the 1994 Asian Games – Women's solo =

Women's solo at the 1994 Asian Games
- Venue: Big Wave Pool
- Dates: 8–9 October 1994
- Competitors: 5 from 5 nations

Medalists
gold medal	Fumiko Okuno	Japan
silver medal	Choi Yoo-jin	China
bronze medal	Choi Jeong-yun	South Korea

The women's solo synchronized swimming competition at the 1994 Asian Games in Hiroshima was held on 8 and 9 October at Big Wave Pool.

== Schedule ==
All times are Japan Standard Time (UTC+09:00)

Date	Time	Event
Saturday, 8 October 1994	13:00	Figure competition
Sunday, 9 October 1994	12:00	Routine competition

== Results ==
Rank	Athlete	Figure	Routine	Total
1st place, gold medalist(s)	Fumiko Okuno (JPN)	89.677	99.320	188.997
2nd place, silver medalist(s)	Wu Chunlan (CHN)	83.071	94.360	177.431
3rd place, bronze medalist(s)	Choi Jeong-yun (KOR)	82.616	94.120	176.736
4	Aliya Karimova (KAZ)			160.092
5	Marina Abrashkina (UZB)			150.960
