= Boxing at the 1994 Asian Games – Men's 60 kg =

Boxing competitions

Men's 60 kg at the 1994 Asian Games
- Venue: Naka Ward Sports Center
- Date: 4–13 October 1994
- Competitors: 14 from 14 nations

Medalists
gold medal	Tsuyoshi Yaegashi	Japan
silver medal	Chaleo Somwong	Thailand
bronze medal	Jamaan Al-Seghaier	Saudi Arabia
bronze medal	Bekmyrat Durdyýew	Turkmenistan

The men's lightweight boxing competition at the 1994 Asian Games in Hiroshima, Japan was held from 4 to 13 October 1994 at Naka Ward Sports Center.

The boxers receive points for every successful punch they land on their opponent's head or upper body. The boxer with the most points at the end of the bouts wins. If a boxer is knocked to the ground and cannot get up before the referee counts to 10 then the bout is over and the opponent wins.

== Schedule ==
All times are Japan Standard Time (UTC+09:00)

Date	Time	Event
Tuesday, 4 October 1994	15:00	1st round
Friday, 7 October 1994	15:00	Quarterfinals
Monday, 10 October 1994	17:00	Semifinals
Thursday, 13 October 1994	14:00	Final

== Results ==
Legend

- RSC — Won by referee stop contest
- WO — Won by walkover

1st round
Nurlan Kalybayev (KAZ)	7
Tsuyoshi Yaegashi (JPN)	9
Victor Ramos (INA)	5
Tümentsetsegiin Üitümen (MGL)	14
Kim Jong-kil (KOR)	10
Bekmyrat Durdyýew (TKM)	14
Vongkot Chinda (LAO)	2
Hussein Osman (SYR)	11
Pejman Chalak (IRI)	8
Romeo Brin (PHI)	13
Chaleo Somwong (THA)	7
Arshad Hussain (PAK)	5

Quarterfinals
Mohammad Homayun (AFG)	4
Jamaan Al-Seghaier (KSA)	5
Tsuyoshi Yaegashi (JPN)	11
Tümentsetsegiin Üitümen (MGL)	6
Bekmyrat Durdyýew (TKM)	19
Hussein Osman (SYR)	18
Romeo Brin (PHI)	12
Chaleo Somwong (THA)	16

Semifinals
Jamaan Al-Seghaier (KSA)
Tsuyoshi Yaegashi (JPN)	RSC
Bekmyrat Durdyýew (TKM)
Chaleo Somwong (THA)	WO

Final
Tsuyoshi Yaegashi (JPN)	RSC
Chaleo Somwong (THA)
