= Synchronized swimming at the 1994 Asian Games – Women's duet =

Women's duet at the 1994 Asian Games
- Venue: Big Wave Pool
- Dates: 8–9 October 1994
- Competitors: 10 from 5 nations

Medalists
gold medal	Fumiko Okuno; Miya Tachibana	Japan
silver medal	Fu Yuling; Li Min	China
bronze medal	Choi Jeong-yun; Choi Yoo-jin	South Korea

The women's duet synchronized swimming competition at the 1994 Asian Games in Hiroshima was held on 8 and 9 October at Big Wave Pool.

== Schedule ==
All times are Japan Standard Time (UTC+09:00)

Date	Time	Event
Saturday, 8 October 1994	13:00	Figure competition
Sunday, 9 October 1994	14:00	Routine competition

== Results ==
Rank	Team	Figure	Routine	Total
1st place, gold medalist(s)	Japan (JPN); Fumiko Okuno; Miya Tachibana	88.537	99.320	187.857
2nd place, silver medalist(s)	China (CHN); Fu Yuling; Li Min	83.332	94.320	177.652
3rd place, bronze medalist(s)	South Korea (KOR); Choi Jeong-yun; Choi Yoo-jin	82.238	94.880	177.118
4	Kazakhstan (KAZ); Aliya Karimova; Nailya Yafarova			161.286
5	Uzbekistan (UZB); Marina Abrashkina; Elmira Mubarashkina			148.894
