= Boxing at the 1994 Asian Games – Men's +91 kg =

Boxing competitions

Men's +91 kg at the 1994 Asian Games
- Venue: Naka Ward Sports Center
- Date: 9–13 October 1994
- Competitors: 6 from 6 nations

Medalists
gold medal	Oleg Maskaev	Uzbekistan
silver medal	Mohammad Reza Samadi	Iran
bronze medal	Raj Kumar Sangwan	India
bronze medal	Safarish Khan	Pakistan

The men's super heavyweight boxing competition at the 1994 Asian Games in Hiroshima, Japan was held from 9 to 13 October 1994 at Naka Ward Sports Center.

== Schedule ==
All times are Japan Standard Time (UTC+09:00)

Date	Time	Event
Sunday, 9 October 1994	15:00	Quarterfinals
Tuesday, 11 October 1994	17:00	Semifinals
Thursday, 13 October 1994	14:00	Final

== Results ==
Legend

- RSC — Won by referee stop contest

Quarterfinals
Safarish Khan (PAK)	7
An Jung-hyun (KOR)	6
Mohammad Reza Samadi (IRI)	14
Viktor Shtorm (KAZ)	7

Semifinals
Oleg Maskaev (UZB)	RSC
Raj Kumar Sangwan (IND)
Safarish Khan (PAK)
Mohammad Reza Samadi (IRI)	RSC

Final
Oleg Maskaev (UZB)	RSC
Mohammad Reza Samadi (IRI)
