= Synchronized swimming at the 1994 Asian Games =

- Venue: Big Wave Pool
- Dates: 8–9 October 1994
- Competitors: 11 from 5 nations

Synchronized swimming was contested from October 8 to October 9 at the 1994 Asian Games in Big Wave Pool, Hiroshima, Japan. A total of 11 athletes from 5 nations competed in the event, Japan won both gold medals, China won both silver medals and South Korea won all bronze medals.

== Schedule ==
T	Technical routine	F	Free routine

Event↓/Date →	8th Sat	9th Sun
Women's solo	T	F
Women's duet	T	F

== Medalists ==
Event	Gold	Silver	Bronze
Solo	Fumiko Okuno; Japan	Wu Chunlan; China	Choi Jeong-yun; South Korea
Duet	Japan; Fumiko Okuno; Miya Tachibana	China; Fu Yuling; Li Min	South Korea; Choi Jeong-yun; Choi Yoo-jin

== Medal table ==
Rank	Nation	Gold	Silver	Bronze	Total
1	Japan (JPN)	2	0	0	2
2	China (CHN)	0	2	0	2
3	South Korea (KOR)	0	0	2	2
Totals (3 entries)		2	2	2	6

== Participating nations ==
A total of 11 athletes from 5 nations competed in synchronized swimming at the 1994 Asian Games:

- China (3)
- Japan (2)
- Kazakhstan (2)
- South Korea (2)
- Uzbekistan (2)
