= Athletics at the 1994 Asian Games =

- Venue: Hiroshima Big Arch
- Dates: 9–16 October 1994

Athletics was contested at the 1994 Asian Games in the Hiroshima Big Arch in Hiroshima, Japan, from October 9 to October 16.

The original winner of the women's 400 metres hurdles, Han Qing of China, was disqualified for doping – the first Asian Games athletics winner to be disqualified in such a manner.

== Medalists ==
=== Men ===
Event	Gold		Silver		Bronze	
100 m	Talal Mansour; Qatar	10.18; GR	Vitaliy Savin; Kazakhstan	10.29	Chen Wenzhong; China	10.38
200 m	Talal Mansour; Qatar	20.41; GR	Koji Ito; Japan	20.70	Ibrahim Ismail Muftah; Qatar	20.88
400 m	Ibrahim Ismail Muftah; Qatar	45.48	Shon Ju-il; South Korea	45.87	Aktawat Sakoolchan; Thailand	46.50
800 m	Lee Jin-il; South Korea	1:45.72; GR	Mu Weiguo; China	1:46.44	Kim Yong-hwan; South Korea	1:46.69
1500 m	Mohamed Suleiman; Qatar	3:40.00; GR	Mu Weiguo; China	3:40.93	Mitsuhiro Okuyama; Japan	3:41.31
5000 m	Toshinari Takaoka; Japan	13:38.37; GR	Ahmed Ibrahim Warsama; Qatar	13:39.59	Sun Ripeng; China	13:40.07
10,000 m	Toshinari Takaoka; Japan	28:15.48; GR	Jun Hiratsuka; Japan	28:18.10	Alyan Al-Qahtani; Saudi Arabia	28:41.18
110 m hurdles	Li Tong; China	13.30; GR	Chen Yanhao; China	13.39	Nur Herman Majid; Malaysia	13.73
400 m hurdles	Shunji Karube; Japan	49.13; GR	Yoshihiko Saito; Japan	49.13 =GR	Ali Ismail Doka; Qatar	49.56
3000 m steeplechase	Sun Ripeng; China	8:31.73; GR	Saad Al-Asmari; Saudi Arabia	8:33.94	Yasunori Uchitomi; Japan	8:37.76
4 × 100 m relay	Japan; Tetsuya Nakamura; Yoshitaka Ito; Satoru Inoue; Koji Ito	39.37	China; Ye Hu; Chen Wenzhong; Huang Danwei; Huang Geng	39.45	Qatar; Saad Muftah Al-Kuwari; Masoud Khamis Rahman; Sultan Al-Sheib; Talal Mansour	39.71
4 × 400 m relay	South Korea; Lee Yun-hak; Shon Ju-il; Lee Jin-il; Kim Soon-hyung	3:10.19	Thailand; Yuthana Thonglek; Chanon Keanchan; Sarapong Kumsup; Aktawat Sakoolchan	3:10.33	Qatar; Hamad Mubarak Al-Dosari; Fareh Ibrahim Ali; Ali Ismail Doka; Ibrahim Ismail Muftah	3:10.49
Marathon	Hwang Young-cho; South Korea	2:11:13	Toshiyuki Hayata; Japan	2:11:57	Kim Jae-ryong; South Korea	2:13:12
20 km walk	Chen Shaoguo; China	1:21:15; GR	Bu Lingtang; China	1:21:56	Valeriy Borisov; Kazakhstan	1:25:31
50 km walk	Sergey Korepanov; Kazakhstan	3:54:37; GR	Fumio Imamura; Japan	3:56:16	Tadahiro Kosaka; Japan	4:05:00
High jump	Takahisa Yoshida; Japan	2.27	Lee Jin-taek; South Korea	2.24	Xu Yang; China	2.24
Pole vault	Igor Potapovich; Kazakhstan	5.65; GR	Grigoriy Yegorov; Kazakhstan	5.50	Kim Chul-kyun; South Korea	5.40
Pole vault	Igor Potapovich; Kazakhstan	5.65; GR	Grigoriy Yegorov; Kazakhstan	5.50	Teruyasu Yonekura; Japan	5.40
Long jump	Huang Geng; China	8.34	Huang Baoting; China	8.12; GR	Konstantin Sarnatskiy; Uzbekistan	8.10
Triple jump	Oleg Sakirkin; Kazakhstan	17.21	Takashi Komatsu; Japan	16.88	Sergey Arzamasov; Kazakhstan	16.57
Shot put	Liu Hao; China	19.26; GR	Sergey Rubtsov; Kazakhstan	19.24	Xie Shengying; China	18.64
Discus throw	Zhang Cunbiao; China	58.78	Ma Wei; China	57.92	Vadim Popov; Uzbekistan	56.78
Hammer throw	Bi Zhong; China	72.24; GR	Koji Murofushi; Japan	67.48	Aqarab Abbas; Pakistan	66.70
Javelin throw	Zhang Lianbiao; China	83.38; GR	Vladimir Parfyonov; Uzbekistan	81.66	Viktor Zaytsev; Uzbekistan	78.64
Decathlon	Ramil Ganiyev; Uzbekistan	8005; GR	Oleg Veretelnikov; Uzbekistan	7702	Tomokazu Sugama; Japan	7666

=== Women ===
Event	Gold		Silver		Bronze	
100 m	Liu Xiaomei; China	11.27; GR	Wang Huei-chen; Chinese Taipei	11.41	Huang Xiaoyan; China	11.43
200 m	Wang Huei-chen; Chinese Taipei	23.34; GR	Susanthika Jayasinghe; Sri Lanka	23.57	Damayanthi Dharsha; Sri Lanka	23.61
400 m	Ma Yuqin; China	51.17; GR	Zhang Hengyun; China	52.53	Kutty Saramma; India	52.57
800 m	Qu Yunxia; China	1:59.85; GR	Liu Li; China	2:00.66	Shiny Wilson; India	2:02.22
1500 m	Qu Yunxia; China	4:12.48; GR	Yan Wei; China	4:13.32	Khin Khin Htwe; Myanmar	4:18.00
3000 m	Zhang Linli; China	8:52.97; GR	Harumi Hiroyama; Japan	8:53.74	Lu Ou; China	8:58.68
10,000 m	Wang Junxia; China	30:50.34; GR	Dong Li; China	31:31.08	Miki Igarashi; Japan	31:45.82
100 m hurdles	Olga Shishigina; Kazakhstan	12.80	Zhou Hongyang; China	12.87	Zhang Yu; China	12.90
400 m hurdles	Leng Xueyan; China	55.26; GR	Hsu Pei-ching; Chinese Taipei	55.75	Natalya Torshina; Kazakhstan	55.81
4 × 100 m relay	China; Chen Yan; Liu Xiaomei; Ou Yanlan; Huang Xiaoyan	43.85; GR	Thailand; Naparat Suajongprue; Dokjun Dokduang; Nednapa Chommuak; Kwuanfah Inchareon	44.46	Japan; Kanae Ito; Toshie Kitada; Kazue Kakinuma; Tomomi Kaneko	44.57
4 × 400 m relay	China; Leng Xueyan; Zhang Hengyun; Cao Chunying; Ma Yuqin	3:29.11; GR	India; P. T. Usha; G. V. Dhanalakshmi; Shiny Wilson; Kutty Saramma	3:33.34	Thailand; Saleerat Srimek; Reawadee Watanasin; Sukanya Sang-nguen; Noodang Phimpho	3:37.76
Marathon	Zhong Huandi; China	2:29:32; GR	Zhang Lirong; China	2:36:27	Nobuko Fujimura; Japan	2:37:03
10 km walk	Gao Hongmiao; China	44:11; GR	Gu Yan; China	44:18	Yuko Sato; Japan	46:51
High jump	Svetlana Munkova; Uzbekistan	1.92	Svetlana Zalevskaya; Kazakhstan	1.89	Rassamee Taemsri; Thailand	1.83
Long jump	Yao Weili; China	6.91; GR	Li Jing; China	6.69	Elma Muros; Philippines	6.41
Shot put	Sui Xinmei; China	20.45	Zhang Liuhong; China	19.25	Sunisa Yooyao; Thailand	16.24
Discus throw	Min Chunfeng; China	62.52	Ikuko Kitamori; Japan	53.92	Miyoko Nakanishi; Japan	49.84
Javelin throw	Oksana Yarygina; Uzbekistan	64.62	Lee Young-sun; South Korea	62.30	Ha Xiaoyan; China	62.08
Heptathlon	Ghada Shouaa; Syria	6360; GR	Zhang Xiaohui; China	5800	Ma Chun-ping; Chinese Taipei	5786

== Medal table ==
Rank	Nation	Gold	Silver	Bronze	Total
1	China (CHN)	22	17	8	47
2	Japan (JPN)	5	9	10	24
3	Kazakhstan (KAZ)	4	4	3	11
4	Qatar (QAT)	4	1	4	9
5	South Korea (KOR)	3	3	3	9
6	Uzbekistan (UZB)	3	2	3	8
7	Chinese Taipei (TPE)	1	2	1	4
8	Syria (SYR)	1	0	0	1
9	Thailand (THA)	0	2	4	6
10	India (IND)	0	1	2	3
11	Saudi Arabia (KSA)	0	1	1	2
11	Sri Lanka (SRI)	0	1	1	2
13	Malaysia (MAS)	0	0	1	1
13	Myanmar (MYA)	0	0	1	1
13	Pakistan (PAK)	0	0	1	1
13	Philippines (PHI)	0	0	1	1
Totals (16 entries)		43	43	44	130
