= Wrestling at the 1994 Asian Games =

- Venue: Higashi-Hiroshima Sports Park
- Dates: 4–10 October 1994

Wrestling was one of the sports which was held at the 1994 Asian Games in Higashi-Hiroshima Sports Park, Hiroshima, Japan between 4 October and 10 October 1994. The competition included only men's events.

== Medalists ==
=== Freestyle ===
Event	Gold	Silver	Bronze
48 kg	Nader Rahmati; Iran	Tümendembereliin Züünbayan; Mongolia	Moon Myung-seok; South Korea
52 kg	Maulen Mamyrov; Kazakhstan	Dun Dege; China	Nurdin Donbaev; Kyrgyzstan
57 kg	Tserenbaataryn Tsogtbayar; Mongolia	Maksat Boburbekov; Kyrgyzstan	Oveis Mallah; Iran
62 kg	Takahiro Wada; Japan	Jang Jae-sung; South Korea	Reza Safaei; Iran
68 kg	Ali Akbarnejad; Iran	Ryusaburo Katsu; Japan	Hwang Sang-ho; South Korea
74 kg	Behrouz Yari; Iran	Takuya Ota; Japan	Park Jang-soon; South Korea
82 kg	Amir Reza Khadem; Iran	Elmadi Zhabrailov; Kazakhstan	Hidekazu Yokoyama; Japan
90 kg	Rasoul Khadem; Iran	Atsushi Ito; Japan	Islam Bayramukov; Kazakhstan
100 kg	Kim Tae-woo; South Korea	Ayoub Baninosrat; Iran	Bat-Erdeniin Battogtokh; Mongolia
130 kg	Ebrahim Mehraban; Iran	Igor Klimov; Kazakhstan	Kim Ik-hee; South Korea

=== Greco-Roman ===
Event	Gold	Silver	Bronze
48 kg	Sim Kwon-ho; South Korea	Reza Simkhah; Iran	Ruslan Gebekov; Kyrgyzstan
52 kg	Min Kyung-gab; South Korea	Khaled Al-Faraj; Syria	Shamsiddin Khudoyberdiev; Uzbekistan
57 kg	Yuriy Melnichenko; Kazakhstan	Sheng Zetian; China	Lee Tae-ho; South Korea
62 kg	Choi Sang-sun; South Korea	Akhmetulla Nurov; Kazakhstan	Bakhodir Kurbanov; Uzbekistan
68 kg	Kim Young-il; South Korea	Grigori Pulyaev; Uzbekistan	Takumi Mori; Japan
74 kg	Han Chee-ho; South Korea	Ruslan Zhumabekov; Kazakhstan	Takamitsu Katayama; Japan
82 kg	Daulet Turlykhanov; Kazakhstan	Raatbek Sanatbayev; Kyrgyzstan	Kim Yeon-soo; South Korea
90 kg	Eom Jin-han; South Korea	Hassan Babak; Iran	Yasutoshi Moriyama; Japan
100 kg	Song Sung-il; South Korea	Vitaliy Leikin; Kazakhstan	Takashi Nonomura; Japan
130 kg	Yang Young-jin; South Korea	Kenichi Suzuki; Japan	Hu Riga; China

== Medal table ==
Rank	Nation	Gold	Silver	Bronze	Total
1	South Korea (KOR)	9	1	6	16
2	Iran (IRI)	6	3	2	11
3	Kazakhstan (KAZ)	3	5	1	9
4	Japan (JPN)	1	4	5	10
5	Mongolia (MGL)	1	1	1	3
6	Kyrgyzstan (KGZ)	0	2	2	4
7	China (CHN)	0	2	1	3
8	Uzbekistan (UZB)	0	1	2	3
9	Syria (SYR)	0	1	0	1
Totals (9 entries)		20	20	20	60
