= Shooting at the 1994 Asian Games =

- Venue: Hiroshima Shooting Range
- Dates: 7–14 October 1994

Shooting sports at the 1994 Asian Games was held in Hiroshima, Japan between 7 and 14 October 1994.

== Medalists ==
=== Men ===
Event	Gold	Silver	Bronze
10 m air pistol	Wang Yifu; China	Zhang Shengge; China	Masaru Nakashige; Japan
10 m air pistol team	China; Li Jinbao; Wang Yifu; Zhang Shengge	Uzbekistan; Shukhrat Akhmedov; Enver Osmanov; Nikolay Repichev	Thailand; Surin Klomjai; Weraphan Komkris; Jakkrit Panichpatikum
25 m center fire pistol	Jaspal Rana; India	Shukhrat Akhmedov; Uzbekistan	Park Byung-taek; South Korea
25 m center fire pistol team	Uzbekistan; Shukhrat Akhmedov; Enver Osmanov; Nikolay Repichev	South Korea; Lee Ki-choon; Lee Sang-hak; Park Byung-taek	India; Surinder Marwah; Ashok Pandit; Jaspal Rana
25 m rapid fire pistol	Vladimir Vokhmyanin; Kazakhstan	Meng Gang; China	Wang Runxi; China
25 m rapid fire pistol team	China; Meng Gang; Wang Runxi; Zhang Ruimin	Kazakhstan; Valeriy Kovalev; Igor Shmotkin; Vladimir Vokhmyanin	South Korea; Lee Sang-hak; Lim Jang-soo; Park Byung-taek
25 m standard pistol	Wang Yifu; China	Park Byung-taek; South Korea	Meng Gang; China
25 m standard pistol team	China; Meng Gang; Wang Runxi; Wang Yifu	Kazakhstan; Valeriy Kovalev; Igor Shmotkin; Vladimir Vokhmyanin	Uzbekistan; Shukhrat Akhmedov; Enver Osmanov; Nikolay Repichev
50 m pistol	Masaru Nakashige; Japan	Wang Yifu; China	Xu Dan; China
50 m pistol team	China; Wang Yifu; Xu Dan; Xu Haifeng	Japan; Kiyoshi Fujii; Mamoru Inagaki; Masaru Nakashige	Uzbekistan; Shukhrat Akhmedov; Enver Osmanov; Nikolay Repichev
10 m air rifle	Ning Lijia; China	Chae Keun-bae; South Korea	Masaru Yanagida; Japan
10 m air rifle team	South Korea; Chae Keun-bae; Kim Se-ho; Kim Sung-soo	Japan; Seijiro Kinouchi; Ryohei Koba; Masaru Yanagida	China; Cao Xiaojun; Du Long; Ning Lijia
50 m rifle prone	Sergey Belyayev; Kazakhstan	Li Wenjie; China	Ning Lijia; China
50 m rifle prone team	China; Jiang Rong; Li Wenjie; Ning Lijia	Japan; Seijiro Kinouchi; Ryohei Koba; Akihiro Mera	Kazakhstan; Sergey Belyayev; Alexandr Melsitov; Yuriy Melsitov
50 m rifle kneeling	Sergey Belyayev; Kazakhstan	Yuri Lomov; Kyrgyzstan	Choi Byung-woo; South Korea
50 m rifle standing	Ryohei Koba; Japan	Lee Eun-chul; South Korea	Cha Young-chul; South Korea
50 m rifle 3 positions	Lee Eun-chul; South Korea	Sergey Belyayev; Kazakhstan	Cha Young-chul; South Korea
50 m rifle 3 positions team	South Korea; Cha Young-chul; Choi Byung-woo; Lee Eun-chul	Kazakhstan; Sergey Belyayev; Alexandr Melsitov; Yuriy Melsitov	China; Cao Xiaojun; Jiang Rong; Ning Lijia
Trap	Zhang Bing; China	Park Chul-sung; South Korea	Fehaid Al-Deehani; Kuwait
Trap team	Kuwait; Fahad Al-Deehani; Fehaid Al-Deehani; Khalaf Al-Otaibi	China; Xu Hongtao; Zhang Bing; Zhang Yongjie	South Korea; Kim Tae-suk; Oh Keum-pyo; Park Chul-sung
Double trap	Fehaid Al-Deehani; Kuwait	Zhang Bing; China	Zhang Yongjie; China
Skeet	Saeed Al-Mutairi; Saudi Arabia	Zhang Xindong; China	Ivan Struchayev; Kazakhstan
Skeet team	Kazakhstan; Sergey Kolos; Sergey Shakhvorostov; Ivan Struchayev	China; Wang Zhonghua; Zhang Weigang; Zhang Xindong	Kuwait; Sayer Al-Deehani; Salah Al-Mutairi; Abdullah Al-Rashidi

=== Women ===
Event	Gold	Silver	Bronze
10 m air pistol	Fan Xiaoping; China	Dorjsürengiin Mönkhbayar; Mongolia	Yoko Inada; Japan
10 m air pistol team	China; Fan Xiaoping; Li Duihong; Wang Lina	Japan; Yoko Inada; Kagumi Komori; Keiko Yoshimoto	South Korea; Boo Soon-hee; Lee Sun-bok; Park Jung-hee
25 m pistol	Fan Xiaoping; China	Boo Soon-hee; South Korea	Li Duihong; China
25 m pistol team	China; Fan Xiaoping; Li Duihong; Wang Lina	South Korea; Boo Soon-hee; Cho Mi-kyung; Park Jung-hee	Kazakhstan; Dina Aspandiyarova; Zauresh Baibussinova; Galina Belyayeva
10 m air rifle	Lee Eun-ju; South Korea	Zhang Qiuping; China	Yeo Kab-soon; South Korea
10 m air rifle team	South Korea; Lee Eun-ju; Oh Mi-ran; Yeo Kab-soon	China; Chen Muhua; Xu Yanhua; Zhang Qiuping	Thailand; Jarintorn Dangpiam; Thanyarat Pupiromchaikul; Nattichata Siththipong
50 m rifle prone	Cho Eun-young; South Korea	Noriko Ojima; Japan	Zhang Qiuping; China
50 m rifle prone team	South Korea; Cho Eun-young; Kong Hyun-ah; Seo Min-young	China; Liu Shibin; Zhang Qiuping; Zhou Danhong	Japan; Junki Enoki; Yoko Minamoto; Noriko Ojima
50 m rifle 3 positions	Noriko Ojima; Japan	Xu Yanhua; China	Zhang Qiuping; China
50 m rifle 3 positions team	China; Xu Yanhua; Zhang Qiuping; Zhou Danhong	South Korea; Cho Eun-young; Kong Hyun-ah; Seo Min-young	Japan; Junki Enoki; Yoko Minamoto; Noriko Ojima
Double trap	Wang Yujin; China	Gao E China	Son Hye-kyoung; South Korea

== Medal table ==
Rank	Nation	Gold	Silver	Bronze	Total
1	China (CHN)	15	13	10	38
2	South Korea (KOR)	7	8	9	24
3	Kazakhstan (KAZ)	4	4	3	11
4	Japan (JPN)	3	5	5	13
5	Kuwait (KUW)	2	0	2	4
6	Uzbekistan (UZB)	1	2	2	5
7	India (IND)	1	0	1	2
8	Saudi Arabia (KSA)	1	0	0	1
9	Kyrgyzstan (KGZ)	0	1	0	1
9	Mongolia (MGL)	0	1	0	1
11	Thailand (THA)	0	0	2	2
Totals (11 entries)		34	34	34	102
