= Judo at the 1994 Asian Games =

Judo competition

- Venue: Hiroshima Sun Plaza
- Dates: 12–15 October 1994

The Judo Competition at the 1994 Asian Games was contested in sixteen weight classes, eight each for men and women. This competition was held from October 12 to October 15, 1994.

== Medalists ==
=== Men ===
Event	Gold	Silver	Bronze
Extra lightweight (−60 kg)	Kim Hyuk; South Korea	Ryuji Sonoda; Japan	Hassan Ahadpour; Iran
Extra lightweight (−60 kg)	Kim Hyuk; South Korea	Ryuji Sonoda; Japan	Serik Adiganov; Kazakhstan
Half lightweight (−65 kg)	Yukimasa Nakamura; Japan	Ivan Karazelidi; Kazakhstan	Hao Yi; China
Half lightweight (−65 kg)	Yukimasa Nakamura; Japan	Ivan Karazelidi; Kazakhstan	Dashgombyn Battulga; Mongolia
Lightweight (−71 kg)	Chung Hoon; South Korea	Shigeru Toyama; Japan	Ismail Vechegurov; Kazakhstan
Lightweight (−71 kg)	Chung Hoon; South Korea	Shigeru Toyama; Japan	Khaliuny Boldbaatar; Mongolia
Half middleweight (−78 kg)	Yoon Dong-sik; South Korea	Hidenori Horikoshi; Japan	Vladimir Shmakov; Uzbekistan
Half middleweight (−78 kg)	Yoon Dong-sik; South Korea	Hidenori Horikoshi; Japan	Lo Yu-wei; Chinese Taipei
Middleweight (−86 kg)	Yoshio Nakamura; Japan	Sergey Alimzhanov; Kazakhstan	Kim Suk-kyu; South Korea
Middleweight (−86 kg)	Yoshio Nakamura; Japan	Sergey Alimzhanov; Kazakhstan	Khayrullo Nazriev; Tajikistan
Half heavyweight (−95 kg)	Shigeru Okaizumi; Japan	Kim Jae-sik; South Korea	Dmitry Soloviev; Uzbekistan
Half heavyweight (−95 kg)	Shigeru Okaizumi; Japan	Kim Jae-sik; South Korea	Sergey Shakimov; Kazakhstan
Heavyweight (+95 kg)	Jun Konno; Japan	Mahmoud Miran; Iran	Wang Ruisheng; China
Heavyweight (+95 kg)	Jun Konno; Japan	Mahmoud Miran; Iran	Badmaanyambuugiin Bat-Erdene; Mongolia
Openweight	Katsuyuki Masuchi; Japan	Lee Joon-young; South Korea	Wang Ruisheng; China
Openweight	Katsuyuki Masuchi; Japan	Lee Joon-young; South Korea	Badmaanyambuugiin Bat-Erdene; Mongolia

=== Women ===
Event	Gold	Silver	Bronze
Extra lightweight (−48 kg)	Ryoko Tamura; Japan	Li Aiyue; China	Kim So-la; South Korea
Extra lightweight (−48 kg)	Ryoko Tamura; Japan	Li Aiyue; China	Huang Yu-hsin; Chinese Taipei
Half lightweight (−52 kg)	Hyun Sook-hee; South Korea	Atsuko Takeda; Japan	Wang Jin; China
Half lightweight (−52 kg)	Hyun Sook-hee; South Korea	Atsuko Takeda; Japan	Tseng Hsiao-fen; Chinese Taipei
Lightweight (−56 kg)	Jung Sun-yong; South Korea	Noriko Sugawara; Japan	Liu Chuang; China
Lightweight (−56 kg)	Jung Sun-yong; South Korea	Noriko Sugawara; Japan	Poonam Chopra; India
Half middleweight (−61 kg)	Jung Sung-sook; South Korea	Yuko Emoto; Japan	Wu Ching Hui; Hong Kong
Half middleweight (−61 kg)	Jung Sung-sook; South Korea	Yuko Emoto; Japan	Zhang Di; China
Middleweight (−66 kg)	Aiko Oishi; Japan	Cho Min-sun; South Korea	Wu Mei-ling; Chinese Taipei
Middleweight (−66 kg)	Aiko Oishi; Japan	Cho Min-sun; South Korea	Nadežda Želtakowa; Turkmenistan
Half heavyweight (−72 kg)	Kim Mi-jung; South Korea	Leng Chunhui; China	Chen Chiu-ping; Chinese Taipei
Half heavyweight (−72 kg)	Kim Mi-jung; South Korea	Leng Chunhui; China	Yuriko Fukuba; Japan
Heavyweight (+72 kg)	Zhang Ying; China	Yeh Wen-hua; Chinese Taipei	Shon Hyun-me; South Korea
Heavyweight (+72 kg)	Zhang Ying; China	Yeh Wen-hua; Chinese Taipei	Kaori Suzuki; Japan
Openweight	Noriko Anno; Japan	Qiao Yanmin; China	Moon Ji-yoon; South Korea
Openweight	Noriko Anno; Japan	Qiao Yanmin; China	Sambuugiin Dashdulam; Mongolia

== Medal table ==
Rank	Nation	Gold	Silver	Bronze	Total
1	Japan (JPN)	8	6	2	16
2	South Korea (KOR)	7	3	4	14
3	China (CHN)	1	3	6	10
4	Kazakhstan (KAZ)	0	2	3	5
5	Chinese Taipei (TPE)	0	1	5	6
6	Iran (IRI)	0	1	1	2
7	Mongolia (MGL)	0	0	5	5
8	Uzbekistan (UZB)	0	0	2	2
9	Hong Kong (HKG)	0	0	1	1
9	India (IND)	0	0	1	1
9	Tajikistan (TJK)	0	0	1	1
9	Turkmenistan (TKM)	0	0	1	1
Totals (12 entries)		16	16	32	64
