= Boxing at the 1994 Asian Games – Men's 91 kg =

Boxing competitions

Men's 91 kg at the 1994 Asian Games
- Venue: Naka Ward Sports Center
- Date: 4–13 October 1994
- Competitors: 9 from 9 nations

Medalists
gold medal	Alisher Avezbaev	Uzbekistan
silver medal	Yousef Hawsawi	Saudi Arabia
bronze medal	Jiang Tao	China
bronze medal	Bahman Azizpour	Iran

The men's heavyweight boxing competition at the 1994 Asian Games in Hiroshima, Japan was held from 4 to 13 October 1994 at Naka Ward Sports Center.

The boxers receive points for every successful punch they land on their opponent's head or upper body. The boxer with the most points at the end of the bouts wins. If a boxer is knocked to the ground and cannot get up before the referee counts to 10 then the bout is over and the opponent wins.

== Schedule ==
All times are Japan Standard Time (UTC+09:00)

Date	Time	Event
Tuesday, 4 October 1994	15:00	1st round
Friday, 7 October 1994	15:00	Quarterfinals
Monday, 10 October 1994	17:00	Semifinals
Thursday, 13 October 1994	14:00	Final

== Results ==
Legend

- KO — Won by knockout
- RSC — Won by referee stop contest

1st round
Mohammad Alauddin (BAN)
Chae Sung-bae (KOR)	RSC

Quarterfinals
Alisher Avezbaev (UZB)	RSC
Raj Kapur Thapaliya (NEP)
Jiang Tao (CHN)	KO
Damdinbazaryn Ganzorig (MGL)
Sergey Filipovich (KGZ)	12
Bahman Azizpour (IRI)	21
Yousef Hawsawi (KSA)	RSC
Chae Sung-bae (KOR)

Semifinals
Alisher Avezbaev (UZB)	13
Jiang Tao (CHN)	12
Bahman Azizpour (IRI)	4
Yousef Hawsawi (KSA)	6

Final
Alisher Avezbaev (UZB)	RSC
Yousef Hawsawi (KSA)
