= 1994 Asian Games medal table =

Medal table for 1994 Asian Games

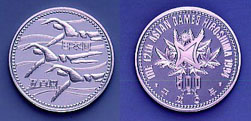
- 1994 Asian Games - Swimming 500 yen commemorative coin
- Location: Hiroshima, Japan

Highlights
- Most gold medals: China 125
- Most total medals: China 266
- Medalling NOCs: 32

The 1994 Asian Games (also known as the XII Asiad), was a multi-sport event held in Hiroshima, Japan from 2 to 16 October 1994. They were the first Asian Games to be held in a non-capital city. The main theme of this edition was to promote peace and harmony among Asian nations. It was emphasized by the host because the venue was the site of the first atomic bomb attack in 1945. A total of 6,828 athletes from 42 National Olympic Committees (NOCs) participated in these games, competing in 34 sports. Baseball, Karate, Modern Pentathlon and Soft tennis were included for the first time. This medal table ranks the participating NOCs by the number of gold medals won by their athletes.

Athletes from 32 participating NOCs won at least one medal; athletes from 20 of these NOCs secured at least one gold. Athletes from China won 125 gold medals, the most of any nation at these Asiad. Host nation Japan finished second in total medals. South Korea finished third in total medals. Kazakhstan, which participated for the first time, finished fourth.

== Medal table ==
The ranking in this table is consistent with Olympic Council of Asia convention in its published medal tables. By default, the table is ordered by the number of gold medals the athletes from a nation have won (in this context, a nation is an entity represented by a National Olympic Committee). The number of silver medals is taken into consideration next and then the number of bronze medals. If nations are still tied, equal ranking is given; they are listed alphabetically by IOC country code.

* Host nation (Japan)

Rank	Nation	Gold	Silver	Bronze	Total
1	China (CHN)	125	83	58	266
2	Japan (JPN)*	64	75	79	218
3	South Korea (KOR)	63	56	64	183
4	Kazakhstan (KAZ)	27	25	27	79
5	Uzbekistan (UZB)	11	12	19	42
6	Iran (IRI)	9	9	8	26
7	Chinese Taipei (TPE)	7	13	24	44
8	India (IND)	4	3	16	23
9	Malaysia (MAS)	4	2	13	19
10	Qatar (QAT)	4	1	5	10
11	Indonesia (INA)	3	12	11	26
12	Thailand (THA)	3	9	14	26
13	Syria (SYR)	3	3	1	7
14	Philippines (PHI)	3	2	8	13
15	Kuwait (KUW)	3	1	5	9
16	Saudi Arabia (KSA)	1	3	5	9
17	Turkmenistan (TKM)	1	3	3	7
18	Mongolia (MGL)	1	2	6	9
19	Vietnam (VIE)	1	2	0	3
20	Singapore (SIN)	1	1	5	7
21	Hong Kong (HKG)	0	6	7	13
22	Pakistan (PAK)	0	4	6	10
23	Kyrgyzstan (KGZ)	0	4	5	9
24	Jordan (JOR)	0	2	2	4
25	United Arab Emirates (UAE)	0	1	3	4
26	Macau (MAC)	0	1	1	2
26	Sri Lanka (SRI)	0	1	1	2
28	Bangladesh (BAN)	0	1	0	1
29	Brunei (BRU)	0	0	2	2
29	Myanmar (MYA)	0	0	2	2
29	Nepal (NEP)	0	0	2	2
29	Tajikistan (TJK)	0	0	2	2
Totals (32 entries)		338	337	404	1,079

== Changes in medal standings ==
Ruling date	Sport	Event	Nation	Gold	Silver	Bronze	Total
3 December 1994	Athletics	Women's 400 m hurdles	China		–1		–1
3 December 1994	Athletics	Women's 400 m hurdles	Chinese Taipei		+1	–1	0
3 December 1994	Athletics	Women's 400 m hurdles	Kazakhstan			+1	+1
3 December 1994	Cycling – Track	Women's sprint	China			–1	–1
3 December 1994	Cycling – Track	Women's sprint	Chinese Taipei			+1	+1
3 December 1994	Canoeing	Men's C1 500 m	China	–1			–1
3 December 1994	Canoeing	Men's C1 500 m	Kazakhstan	+1	–1		0
3 December 1994	Canoeing	Men's C1 500 m	South Korea		+1	–1	0
3 December 1994	Canoeing	Men's C1 500 m	Uzbekistan			+1	+1
3 December 1994	Canoeing	Men's C1 1000 m	China	–1			–1
3 December 1994	Canoeing	Men's C1 1000 m	Uzbekistan	+1	–1		0
3 December 1994	Canoeing	Men's C1 1000 m	South Korea		+1	–1	0
3 December 1994	Canoeing	Men's C1 1000 m	Japan			+1	+1
3 December 1994	Canoeing	Men's C2 500 m	China		–1		–1
3 December 1994	Canoeing	Men's C2 500 m	Uzbekistan		+1	–1	0
3 December 1994	Canoeing	Men's C2 500 m	South Korea			+1	+1
3 December 1994	Canoeing	Men's C2 1000 m	China		–1		–1
3 December 1994	Canoeing	Men's C2 1000 m	Uzbekistan		+1	–1	0
3 December 1994	Canoeing	Men's C2 1000 m	India			+1	+1
3 December 1994	Swimming	Men's 50 m freestyle	China	–1	+1	–1	–1
3 December 1994	Swimming	Men's 50 m freestyle	Kazakhstan	+1	–1	+1	+1
3 December 1994	Swimming	Men's 200 m freestyle	China	–1			–1
3 December 1994	Swimming	Men's 200 m freestyle	Japan	+1		–1	0
3 December 1994	Swimming	Men's 200 m freestyle	South Korea			+1	+1
3 December 1994	Swimming	Men's 200 m butterfly	China	–1			–1
3 December 1994	Swimming	Men's 200 m butterfly	Japan		+1		+1
3 December 1994	Swimming	Men's 200 m individual medley	China	–1			–1
3 December 1994	Swimming	Men's 200 m individual medley	Thailand	+1	–1		0
3 December 1994	Swimming	Men's 200 m individual medley	Japan		+1		+1
3 December 1994	Swimming	Men's 400 m individual medley	China	–1		–1	–2
3 December 1994	Swimming	Men's 400 m individual medley	Thailand	+1	–1		0
3 December 1994	Swimming	Men's 400 m individual medley	Japan		+1	+1	+2
3 December 1994	Swimming	Men's 4 × 100 m freestyle relay	China		–1		0
3 December 1994	Swimming	Men's 4 × 100 m freestyle relay	Kazakhstan		+1	–1	0
3 December 1994	Swimming	Men's 4 × 100 m freestyle relay	Uzbekistan			+1	+1
3 December 1994	Swimming	Men's 4 × 100 m freestyle relay	China	–1			–1
3 December 1994	Swimming	Men's 4 × 100 m freestyle relay	Japan	+1	–1		0
3 December 1994	Swimming	Men's 4 × 100 m freestyle relay	South Korea		+1	–1	0
3 December 1994	Swimming	Men's 4 × 100 m freestyle relay	Thailand			+1	+1
3 December 1994	Swimming	Women's 50 m freestyle	China	–1			–1
3 December 1994	Swimming	Women's 50 m freestyle	Japan	+1		–1	0
3 December 1994	Swimming	Women's 50 m freestyle	Hong Kong			+1	+1
3 December 1994	Swimming	Women's 100 m freestyle	China		–1		–1
3 December 1994	Swimming	Women's 100 m freestyle	Japan		+1		+1
3 December 1994	Swimming	Women's 200 m freestyle	China		–1		–1
3 December 1994	Swimming	Women's 200 m freestyle	Japan		+1		+1
3 December 1994	Swimming	Women's 400 m freestyle	China	–1	–1		–2
3 December 1994	Swimming	Women's 400 m freestyle	Japan	+1	+1	–1	+1
3 December 1994	Swimming	Women's 400 m freestyle	South Korea			+1	+1
3 December 1994	Swimming	Women's 800 m freestyle	China		–1		–1
3 December 1994	Swimming	Women's 800 m freestyle	Japan		+1		+1
3 December 1994	Swimming	Women's 100 m backstroke	China		–1		–1
3 December 1994	Swimming	Women's 100 m backstroke	Japan		+1		+1
3 December 1994	Swimming	Women's 200 m individual medley	China		–1		–1
3 December 1994	Swimming	Women's 200 m individual medley	Japan		+1		+1
3 December 1994	Swimming	Women's 4 × 100 m freestyle relay	China	–1			–1
3 December 1994	Swimming	Women's 4 × 100 m freestyle relay	Japan	+1	–1		0
3 December 1994	Swimming	Women's 4 × 100 m freestyle relay	Hong Kong		+1	–1	0
3 December 1994	Swimming	Women's 4 × 100 m freestyle relay	South Korea			+1	+1
