= Boxing at the 1998 Asian Games – Men's 67 kg =

Boxing competitions

Men's 67 kg at the 1998 Asian Games
- Venue: Land Sports Complex
- Date: 7–17 December 1998
- Competitors: 14 from 14 nations

Medalists
gold medal	Parkpoom Jangphonak	Thailand
silver medal	Nurzhan Smanov	Kazakhstan
bronze medal	Nariman Ataev	Uzbekistan
bronze medal	Bae Ho-jo	South Korea

The men's welterweight boxing competition at the 1998 Asian Games in Bangkok, Thailand was held from 7 to 17 December at the Land Sports Complex.

Like all Asian Games boxing events, the competition was a straight single-elimination tournament. This event consisted of 16 boxers. The competition began with the round of 16 on 7 December, where the number of competitors was reduced to 8, and concluded with the final on 17 December. As there were fewer than 16 boxers in the competition, a number of boxers received a bye through the preliminary round. Both semi-final losers were awarded bronze medals.

All bouts consisted of five three-minute rounds. The boxers receive points for every successful punch they land on their opponent's head or upper body. The boxer with the most points at the end of the bouts wins. If a boxer is knocked to the ground and cannot get up before the referee counts to 10 then the bout is over and the opponent wins.

== Schedule ==
All times are Indochina Time (UTC+07:00)

Date	Time	Event
Monday, 7 December 1998	14:00	Round of 16
Saturday, 12 December 1998	14:00	Quarterfinals
Monday, 14 December 1998	14:00	Semifinals
Thursday, 17 December 1998	14:00	Final

== Results ==
Legend

- RSC — Won by referee stop contest outclassed

Round of 16
Nariman Ataev (UZB)	RSCO
Jaber Abdulrahman (KUW)
Kenzhebek Akelbaev (KGZ)	16
Takuji Matsuhashi (JPN)	11
Regues Gommies (INA)	14
Abdul Rasheed Baloch (PAK)	12
Bae Ho-jo (KOR)	5
Anoushiravan Nourian (IRI)	4
Romeo Brin (PHI)	11
Mahmoud Salloum (SYR)	4
Nurzhan Smanov (KAZ)	4
Damdinbazaryn Batsüren (MGL)	2

Quarterfinals
Parkpoom Jangphonak (THA)	RSCO
Prakash Thapa Magar (NEP)
Nariman Ataev (UZB)	14
Kenzhebek Akelbaev (KGZ)	2
Regues Gommies (INA)	10
Bae Ho-jo (KOR)	21
Romeo Brin (PHI)	5
Nurzhan Smanov (KAZ)	12

Semifinals
Parkpoom Jangphonak (THA)	15
Nariman Ataev (UZB)	5
Bae Ho-jo (KOR)	5
Nurzhan Smanov (KAZ)	15

Final
Parkpoom Jangphonak (THA)	10
Nurzhan Smanov (KAZ)	4
