= Chen Tao =

Chen Tao may refer to:

- Chen Tao (UFO religion), a religious group that originated in 20th-century Taiwan
- Chen Tao (boxer) (born 1972), Chinese boxer
- Chen Tao (poet) (824–882), Tang Dynasty poet
- Chen Tao (footballer) (born 1985), Chinese association footballer
- Chen Yufan (born Chen Tao, 1975), Chinese actor and singer
