= Dhanalakshmi (disambiguation) =

Dhanalakshmi or Dhana Laxmi, is one of the eight forms called Ashta Lakshmi of Lakshmi, the Hindu goddess of wealth, fortune and prosperity.

Dhana Lakshmi may also refer to:

== People ==
- G. V. Dhanalakshmi, an Indian athlete
- Dhanalakshmi Sekhar, an Indian athlete

== Others ==
- Dhanalakshmi (film) is a 1977 Indian Kannada-language film by K. S. Sathyanarayana

== See also ==
- Dhanlaxmi Bank, Kerala, India
- Dhanalakshmi Srinivasan University, Tiruchirappalli, Tamil Nadu, India
- Dhanalakshmi, I Love You, a 2002 Indian film
