= Kaddour =

Kaddour (Arabic: قدّور) is an Arabic surname. Notable people with the surname include:

- Adnan Kaddour (born 1971), Syrian boxer
- Ahmad Al Kaddour (born 1993), Syrian footballer
- Ahmad Kaddour (born 1982), Lebanese boxer
- Hédi Kaddour (born 1945), French poet and novelist
- Karim Kaddour (born 1983), Algerian-French footballer
- Khoder Kaddour (born 2003), Lebanese international footballer
