= Soft tennis at the 1994 Asian Games =

- Venue: Hiroshima Central Tennis Stadium
- Dates: 10–14 October 1994

Soft tennis was a discipline of the tennis competitions at the 1994 Asian Games. Competition took place from October 10 to October 14. All events were held at the Central Tennis Stadium in Hiroshima, Japan.

South Korea topped the medal table winning two gold medals.

== Medalists ==
Event	Gold	Silver	Bronze
Men's doubles	South Korea; Lee Myung-gu; You Young-dong	South Korea; Jang Han-sub; Lee Suk-woo	Chinese Taipei; Liao Nan-kai; Lai Yung-liao
Men's team	Chinese Taipei; Chen Hsin-teng; Hsieh Shun-feng; Lai Yung-liao; Liao Nan-kai; Liu Hung-yu	South Korea; Jang Han-sub; Kim Tae-kyun; Lee Myung-gu; Lee Suk-woo; You Young-dong	Japan; Takahisa Hirayama; Hideyuki Kitamoto; Hironobu Saito; Tsuneo Takagawa; Akihiro Uematsu
Women's doubles	Japan; Miyuki Kumano; Yuriko Sunamoto	South Korea; Yoon Sun-kyung; Jung Soon-young	Japan; Reiko Sahashi; Miyuki Furusawa
Women's team	South Korea; Jung Soon-young; Kang Ji-sook; Park Soon-joung; Park Young-a; Yoon Sun-kyung	Chinese Taipei; Chang Shih-tsung; Chang Shu-chuan; Cheng Shu-chen; Lin Li-jung; Peng Mei-yuan	Japan; Miyuki Furusawa; Yoshiko Goto; Miyuki Kumano; Reiko Sahashi; Yuriko Sunamoto

== Medal table ==
Rank	Nation	Gold	Silver	Bronze	Total
1	South Korea (KOR)	2	3	0	5
2	Chinese Taipei (TPE)	1	1	1	3
3	Japan (JPN)	1	0	3	4
Totals (3 entries)		4	4	4	12
