= Yong-sam =

Yong-sam may refer to:

- Je Yong-sam (Korean: 제용삼; born 1972), South Korean football striker
- Young-sam (Korean: 영삼), Korean given name also spelled "Yong-sam"
