= Vladimir Parfyonov =

Uzbekistani javelin thrower (born 1970)

Personal information
- Born: 17 June 1970 (age 56)
- Height: 1.95 m (6 ft 5 in)
- Weight: 105 kg (231 lb)

Sport
- Country: Uzbekistan
- Sport: Athletics
- Event: Javelin throw
Medal record
Men's athletics
Representing Uzbekistan
Asian Games
Silver medal – second place	1994 Hiroshima	Javelin throw
Asian Championships
Silver medal – second place	1993 Manila	Javelin throw

Vladimir Parfyonov (Russian: Владимир Парфëнов; born 17 June 1970) is a retired male javelin thrower from Uzbekistan. He set his personal best (84.52 metres) on 25 June 1995 in Palafrugell.

== Achievements ==
Year	Competition	Venue	Position	Notes
Representing Uzbekistan
1993	Asian Championships	Manila, Philippines	2nd	77.32 m
1993	World Championships	Stuttgart, Germany	38th	70.88 m
1994	Asian Games	Hiroshima, Japan	2nd	81.66 m
1995	World Championships	Gothenburg, Sweden	25th	73.64 m
1996	Olympic Games	Atlanta, Georgia, United States	27th	73.96 m
1997	World Championships	Athens, Greece	39th	62.48 m
