= Fu Yuling =

Chinese synchronized swimmer

Personal information
- Born: April 14, 1974 (age 52) Henan, China

Sport
- Sport: Synchronised swimming
Medal record
Representing China
Asian Games
Silver medal – second place	1994 Hiroshima	Duet competition

Fu Yuling (Chinese: 付豫玲, born 14 April 1974) is a Chinese former synchronized swimmer who competed in the 1996 Summer Olympics.
