= Wu Chunlan =

Chinese synchronized swimmer

Personal information
- Born: November 19, 1972 (age 53) Shantou, Guangdong, China

Sport
- Sport: Swimming
Medal record
Representing China
Asian Games
Silver medal – second place	1994 Hiroshima	Solo

Wu Chunlan (Chinese: 吴纯兰; born 19 November 1972) is a Chinese former synchronized swimmer who competed in the 1996 Summer Olympics.
