= Pino Bahari =

Indonesian boxer (born 1972)

Personal information
- Nationality: Indonesian
- Born: 15 October 1972 (age 53) Denpasar, Bali, Indonesia

Sport
- Sport: Boxing
Medal record
Men's boxing
Representing Indonesia
Asian Games
| Gold medal – first place | 1990 Beijing | Middleweight |

Pino Jeffta Udayana Bahari (born 15 October 1972) is an Indonesian boxer, who won a middleweight gold medal at the 1990 Asian Games for Indonesia. He is older brother of Indonesian Olympic boxer, Nemo Bahari.

== Career ==
At the 1990 Asian Games, Pino won a gold medal after defeating Mongolian boxer Bandiin Altangerel in final. He participated in several editions of the SEA Games, but failed to win gold medal. After winning 1996 National Sports Week gold medal for Bali, he retired from boxing.

== Post career ==
After retiring, he became a trainer. He also helped his father, Daniel Bahari, managing a professional boxing event promoter. He participated in the 2014 election as a DPR RI legislative candidate from Bali, but was not elected.
