= Young-sam =

- Hangul: 영삼
- RR: Yeongsam
- MR: Yŏngsam

Young-sam or Yong-sam is a Korean given name. Notable people with the name include:

- Joo Young-sam (born 1966), South Korean gymnast
- Kim Young-sam (died 2015), South Korean politician
- Kim Young-sam (footballer) (born 1982), South Korean football full back and defensive midfielder
- Ko Young-sam (born 1971), South Korean boxer
- Min Young-sam (born 1954), South Korean sport shooter
- Ri Yong-sam (born 1972), North Korean wrestler
