= Nurzhan Smanov =

Kazakhstani boxer (born 1972)

Personal information
- Born: February 17, 1972 (age 54)
Medal record
Men's Boxing
Representing Kazakhstan
Asian Games
Gold medal – first place	1994 Hiroshima	Welterweight
Silver medal – second place	1998 Bangkok	Welterweight

Nurzhan Smanov (Нуржан Сманов; born February 17, 1972) is a retired boxer from Kazakhstan, who competed for his native country in the Men's Welterweight (– 67 kg) division at the 1996 Summer Olympics in Atlanta, Georgia. He was defeated in the quarterfinals by Cuba's eventual silver medalist Juan Hernández Sierra.

Smanov is an Asian champion as well, having won gold at the 1994 Asian Games in addition to a bronze at the 1998 Asian Games.
