= Ayoub Pourtaghi =

Iranian boxer (1973–2021)

Personal information
- Full name: Ayoub Pourtaghi Ghoushchi
- Nationality: Iranian
- Born: January 1, 1973 Urmia, Iran
- Died: September 29, 2021 (aged 48) Istanbul، Turkey
- Height: 182 cm (6 ft 0 in)
- Weight: 81 kg (179 lb)

Sport
- Sport: Boxing
Medal record
Asian Games
Gold medal – first place	1994 Hiroshima	81 kg
Asian Championships
Gold medal – first place	1994 Tehran	81 kg
Bronze medal – third place	1995 Tashkent	81 kg

Ayoub Pourtaghi Ghoushchi (Persian: ایوب پورتقی قوشچی; 1 January 1973 – 29 September 2021) was an amateur boxer from Iran, who competed in the 1996 Summer Olympics in the Light heavyweight (81 kg) division and lost in the first round to Jean-Louis Mandengue of France. He also participated at the 1994 Asian Games and won the gold medal.
