= Mohammad Reza Samadi =

Iranian boxer (born 1971)

Personal information
- Full name: Mohammad Reza Samadi Kalkhoran
- Nationality: Iranian
- Born: January 1, 1971 (age 55)

Sport
- Sport: Boxing
Medal record
Asian Games
Silver medal – second place	1994 Hiroshima	+91 kg
Silver medal – second place	1998 Bangkok	+91 kg
Asian Championships
Gold medal – first place	1995 Tashkent	+91 kg
Gold medal – first place	1997 Kuala Lumpur	+91 kg
West Asian Games
Gold medal – first place	1997 Tehran	+91 kg

Mohammad Reza Samadi Kalkhoran (Persian: محمدرضا صمدی کلخوران; born 1 January 1971) is a retired amateur boxer from Iran, who competed in the 1996 Summer Olympics in the Super heavyweight (+91 kg) division and lost in the first round to Duncan Dokiwari of Nigeria. He is also a two time Asian Games silver medalist.
