= Svetlana Munkova =

Uzbekistani high jumper

Personal information
- Nationality: Uzbekistani
- Born: May 23, 1965 (age 61) Tashkent, Uzbek SSR
- Height: 175 cm (5 ft 9 in)
- Weight: 59 kg (130 lb)

Sport
- Sport: Athletics
- Event: High jump
Medal record
Women's athletics
Representing Uzbekistan
Asian Championships
Silver medal – second place	1993 Manila	High jump

Svetlana Vladimirovna Munkova (before marriage – Ruban) (born on May 23, 1965, Tashkent, Uzbek SSR, USSR) – Uzbek track and field athlete who competed in the high jump. Champion of the 1994 Asian Summer Games, silver medalist of the 1993 Asian Championship. Participated in the 1996 Summer Olympics.

== Career ==
Svetlana Munkova was born on May 23, 1965, in Tashkent. She represented Uzbekistan in international track and field competitions.

In 1993 she won a silver medal at the Asian Championships in Manila with a jump of 1.92 meters, showing results that earned her the second place. She narrowly lost to the winner, Svetlana Zalevskaya from Kazakhstan, based on the number of attempts.

In 1994 she secured a gold medal at the Summer Asian Games in Hiroshima with a jump of 1.92 meters. In 1994, the President of Uzbekistan, Islam Karimov, awarded Svetlana the "Shuxrat" medal for her for participation in the XII Asian Games held in Hiroshima.

In 1995 she failed to reach the finals at the World Indoor Championships in Barcelona with a result of 1.80 meters, sharing the 23rd–26th place. At the World Championships in Gothenburg, she again missed the finals (1.85 meters), finishing 15th–16th in her qualification group.

In 1996 she was part of the Uzbekistan national team at the Summer Olympics in Atlanta. She cleared 1.75 meters on her first attempt in the qualifications and 1.80 meters on her third attempt but couldn't clear the bar at 1.85 meters. She finished 28th overall, trailed the winner, Inga Babakova from Ukraine, by 13 centimeters.

She currently resides in Samara and works as a swimming coach.

== Personal records ==
High jump – 1.94 meters (May 17, 1988, Alma-Ata).

Indoor high jump – 1.80 meters (March 10, 1995, Barcelona).
