= Hermensen Ballo =

Indonesian boxer (born 1971)

Personal information
- Nationality: Indonesia
- Born: February 26, 1971 (age 55) Kupang, Indonesia
- Height: 1.60 m (5 ft 3 in)
- Weight: 51 kg (112 lb)

Sport
- Sport: Boxing
- Weight class: Flyweight
Medal record
Asian Games
Bronze medal – third place	1994 Hiroshima	Light Flyweight

Hermensen Ballo (born 26 February 1971) is a retired Indonesian boxer. He twice represented Indonesia at the Summer Olympics in 1996 and 2000. In 1996 he was stopped in the second round of the men's flyweight division by eventual bronze medalist Zoltan Lunka from Germany after defeating Guy-Elie Boulingui of Gabon in his opening contest. In 2000 he lost his first bout to José Navarro of the United States.
