= Birju Shah =

Indian boxer (died 2022)

Personal information
- Nationality: Indian
- Died: 4 September 2022 Jamshedpur, Jharkhand, India

Sport
- Sport: Boxing
Medal record
Men's Boxing
Representing India
Asian Games
Bronze medal – third place	1994 Hiroshima	light flyweight
Commonwealth Games
Bronze medal – third place	1994 Victoria	light flyweight
National Games
Gold medal – first place	1993; 1994	light flyweight
Bronze medal – third place	1997	light flyweight
Silver medal – second place	1999	light flyweight

Birju Shah (died 4 September 2022) was an Indian International boxer who won silver and bronze medals for India in the Asian Games and Commonwealth Games in 1994-95, and medals in National Games.

== Biography ==
Birju Shah was born at Jamshedpur, Bihar (now Jharkhand), India.

Birju Shah represented India as a boxer and had won many Gold, Silver and Bronze medals for India in Asian, Commonwealth Games and international championships. He won Bronze medal in Junior Asian Championships in 1993. Birju won Bronze medals in both Asian Games and Commonwealth Games in 1994. Birju became the country's first boxer to win medals in both Asian Games and Commonwealth Games. He also won Gold medal in YMCA International Championship in 1996 and Bronze medal in International Invitational Championship in 1994 and 1998.

He had also won many medals in national level games played in the country. He won Gold (1993 and 1994), Silver (1999) and Bronze (1997) in National Games and also won Gold medal in national championship in 1995, 1996 and 1998. He had also won Bronze medal in East India Open Championship in 2000.

== Death ==
Birju Shah died on 4 September 2022 at the age of 50 years, at Jamshedpur, Jharkhand. He was suffering from Blood Pressure, Diabetes and liver related disease.
