= Oksana Yarygina =

Uzbekistani-Russian javelin thrower

Medal record

Women's athletics

Representing Uzbekistan

Asian Championships
Silver medal – second place	1993 Manila	Javelin throw

Oksana Aleksandrovna Yarygina (Russian: Оксана Александровна Ярыгина; born 24 December 1972) is a javelin thrower from Russia. She formerly represented Uzbekistan. She won the silver medal at the 1993 Asian Championships and the gold medal at the 1994 Asian Games, the latter in a career best throw of 64.62 metres (with the old javelin type).

For Russia she competed at the 2004 Olympic Games without reaching the final. Her personal best throw is 64.34 metres, achieved in May 1999 in Krasnodar. From August 2005 to August 2007 she was suspended due to a doping offense.

== International competitions ==
Year	Competition	Venue	Position	Notes
Representing Uzbekistan
1993	Asian Championships	Manila, Philippines	2nd	59.84 m
1994	Asian Games	Hiroshima, Japan	1st	64.62 m
Representing Russia
2004	Olympic Games	Athens, Greece	26th	57.57 m
