= G. V. Dhanalakshmi =

Indian sprinter

Personal information
- Nationality: Indian
- Born: Madras

Sport
- Country: India
- Sport: Athletics
- Event: 400Mts
- University team: Osmania University
Medal record
Women's athletics
Representing India
Asian Games
Silver medal – second place	1994 Hiroshima	4×100 m

G. V. Dhanalakshmi is an Indian athlete. She won a silver medal in 4 × 100 m relay in the 1994 Asian Games. hails from Hyderabad studied in Kendriya Vidyalaya Golconda No 1 upto 12 standard and Bachelor of Arts degree from Nizam college in Hyderabad. now working as Assistant Commissioner in Hyderabad GST.

She is a winner of Gold Medal in 1991 Asian Track and Field meet and Gold medal in South Asian Federation Games 1991 in 4x 400 Mts.
