= Konstantin Sarnatskiy =

Uzbekistani long jumper

Konstantin Sarnatskiy (born 16 October 1971, died 14 february 2021) was an Uzbekistani long jumper.

== Career ==
He finished eleventh at the 1995 World Indoor Championships, and on the regional level he won the 1995 and 1997 Central Asian Games as well as the bronze medal at the 1994 Asian Games. He finished sixth at the 1998 Asian Games, and also competed at the 1995 World Championships without reaching the final.

His personal best time was 8.10 metres, achieved at the 1994 Asian Games in Hiroshima.
