= Bakhtiyar Tolegenov =

Kazakhstani boxer

Bakhtiyar Kuanyshuly Tolegenov (Kazakh: Бақтияр Қуанышұлы Төлегенов; born January 5, 1976) is a retired boxer from Kazakhstan, who competed in the Men's Featherweight (– 57 kg) division at the 1996 Summer Olympics in Atlanta, Georgia. He was defeated in the first round by USA's eventual bronze medalist Floyd Mayweather Jr.
