= Bektas Abubakirov =

Kazakhstani boxer (born 1972)

Personal information
- Full name: Бектас Абубакиров
- Nationality: Kazakhstan
- Born: 12 December 1972
- Died: 11 August 2009 (aged 36)
- Height: 1.65 m (5 ft 5 in)
- Weight: 54 kg (119 lb)

Sport
- Sport: Boxing
- Weight class: Bantamweight

Bektas Abubakirov (Kazakh: Бектас Абубакиров; December 12, 1972 – August 11, 2009) was a retired boxer from Kazakhstan, who competed for his native country in the Men's Bantamweight (– 54 kg) at the 1996 Summer Olympics in Atlanta, Georgia. There he was defeated in the first round by France's Rachid Bouaita.
