= Elias Recaido =

Filipino boxer

Personal information
- Nationality: Filipino
- Born: May 15, 1970 (age 56) Philippines
- Height: 5 ft 4 in (163 cm)
- Weight: 112 lb (51 kg)

Sport
- Sport: Boxing
- Weight class: Light flyweight, flyweight
Medal record
Men's boxing
Representing Philippines
Asian Games
Gold medal – first place	1994 Hiroshima	Flyweight
Bronze medal – third place	1990 Beijing	Light flyweight

Elias Recaido Jr. (born May 15, 1970) is a Filipino former amateur boxer who competed for the Philippines at the 1996 Summer Olympics in Atlanta, Georgia. There he was defeated in the quarterfinals of the Men's Flyweight (– 51 kg) division by Cuba's eventual gold medalist Maikro Romero (3:18). He won a bronze medal at the 1990 Asian Games.
