= Anoushiravan Nourian =

Iranian boxer (born 1972)

Personal information
- Full name: Anoushiravan Nourian
- Nationality: Iran; Australia
- Born: 25 January 1972 (age 54) Tehran, Imperial State of Iran
- Height: 1.65 m (5 ft 5 in)
- Weight: 63 kg (139 lb)

Sport
- Sport: Boxing
- Weight class: Light welterweight
- Club: Australian Institute of Sport (AUS)
Medal record
Men's boxing
Representing Iran
Asian Games
Bronze medal – third place	1994 Hiroshima	67 kg
West Asian Games
Gold medal – first place	1997 Tehran	67 kg

Anoushiravan Nourian (Persian: انوشیروان نوریان; born 25 January 1972) is a retired amateur Iranian-born Australian boxer. He picked up a bronze medal in the welterweight at the 1994 Asian Games in Hiroshima, and also competed in two editions of the Olympic Games (1992 and 2004) under different banners. Nourian's career had been overshadowed by a doping controversy in 2000, resulting to a ban from the Iranian boxing team at the Summer Olympics in Sydney and his emigration to Australia, where he later obtained a dual citizenship.

Nourian made his official debut at the 1992 Summer Olympics in Barcelona, where he ousted his opening match to Italy's Michele Piccirillo in men's light welterweight division (63.5 kg), receiving a default score 5–23. Two years later, Nourian came powerful with a bronze medal on his semi-final match 17–26 against Thailand's Arkhom Chenglai in the welterweight category (70 kg) at the 1994 Asian Games in Hiroshima, Japan.

At the 2000 Summer Olympics in Sydney, Nourian sought his sights to compete for the Iranian team in the light welterweight division (63.5 kg). On 17 September 2000, the International Amateur Boxing Association banned him from the Games after he was tested positive for the steroid nandrolone, permitting his opponent Ajose Olusegun of Nigeria to walkover with an effortless victory in the first round. As a result, Nourian left the Iranian boxing squad shortly to move to Sydney, and later became a naturalised citizen in February 2004. Pursuing his sporting career outside of Iran, Nourian trained under the boxing squad for the Australian Institute of Sport in Canberra.

Twelve years after his Olympic debut, Nourian qualified for his newly joined Australian squad, as a 32-year-old veteran, in the men's light welterweight division (63.5 kg) at the 2004 Summer Olympics in Athens. Earlier in the process, he guaranteed a spot on the nation's boxing team after finishing first from the AIBA Oceania Qualification Tournament in Tonga. Unlike his two previous Games, Nourian scored a convincing victory 22–51 over Seychelles' Kitson Julie in the opening round, before losing out his next match to Italy's Michele di Rocco with a decisive 25–33 count.
