= Adnan Kaddour =

Syrian boxer

Personal information
- Nationality: Syrian
- Born: 1 March 1971 (age 54)
- Height: 1.73 m (5 ft 8 in)
- Weight: 81 kg (179 lb)

Sport
- Sport: Boxing

Adnan Kaddour (Arabic: عدنان قدور; born 1 March 1971) is a Syrian boxer. He competed in the 1996 Summer Olympics, where he lost his only fight.
