= Shukhrat Akhmedov =

Uzbekistani sport shooter (born 1963)

Personal information
- Nationality: Uzbekistan
- Born: 17 March 1963 (age 62)

Sport
- Sport: Shooting

Shukhrat Akhmedov (born 17 March 1963) is an Uzbekistani sport shooter. He competed in the 1996 Summer Olympics.
