= Aliya Karimova =

Kazakhstani synchronized swimmer

Personal information
- Full name: Aliya Toregaliyevna Karimova
- Nationality: Kazakhstan
- Born: 31 January 1978 (age 48) Tyrgayskaya Oblast, Kazakhstan
- Height: 175 cm (5 ft 9 in)
- Weight: 60 kg (130 lb)

Sport
- Sport: Swimming
- Strokes: Synchronized swimming

Aliya Karimova (Алия Торегалиевна Каримова, born 31 January 1978) is a Kazakhstani synchronized swimmer. She competed in the women's duet at the 2000 and 2004 Olympic Games.
