= Fumitaka Nitami =

Japanese boxer

Fumitaka Nitami (仁多見 史隆, Nitami Fumitaka) (born December 27, 1974, in Niigata) is a retired male boxer from Japan. He represented his native country at the 1996 Summer Olympics in Atlanta, Georgia, where he was stopped in the first round of the men's light-welterweight division (– 63,5 kg) by Russia's Eduard Zakharov.
