= Fumiko Okuno =

Japanese synchronized swimmer

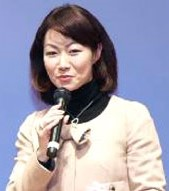
- Okuno in 2009

Personal information
- Born: 14 April 1972 (age 54) Kyoto, Japan
- Height: 160 cm (5 ft 3 in)
- Weight: 49 kg (108 lb)

Sport
- Sport: Swimming
- Strokes: Synchronised swimming
Medal record
Women's Synchronised swimming
Representing Japan
Olympic Games
Bronze medal – third place	1992 Barcelona	Solo
Bronze medal – third place	1992 Barcelona	Duet

Fumiko Okuno (Japanese: 奥野史子 Okuno Fumiko; born April 14, 1972, in Kyoto) is a former competitor in synchronised swimming from Japan. She competed in both the women's solo and women's duet events at the 1992 Summer Olympics, and won two bronze medals.

== Personal life ==
Fumiko Okuno married track star Nobuharu Asahara in 2002. They have three children together.
