= Qatar at the 1994 Asian Games =

Qatar at the Asian Games
- IOC code: QAT
- NOC: Qatar Olympic Committee
- Medals: Gold 4 Silver 1 Bronze 5 Total 10

Summer appearances
- 1978; 1982; 1986; 1990; 1994; 1998; 2002; 2006; 2010; 2014; 2018; 2022; 2026

Winter appearances
- 2011; 2017; 2025; 2029

Qatar competed in the 1994 Asian Games in Hiroshima, Japan. They won a total of (4) gold, (1) silver, and (5) bronze medals. They won a total of 10 medals. They won all their medals in athletics, in the men's 100m, 200m, 400m, 1500m, 5000m, 400m hurdles, 1x400m relay, and 4 × 400 m relay.
