= Dilshod Yarbekov =

Uzbekistani boxer (born 1974)

Personal information
- Born: May 1, 1974 (age 52)
Medal record
Men's Boxing
Representing Uzbekistan
World Amateur Championships
| Bronze medal – third place | 1995 Berlin | Middleweight |
Asian Games
| Bronze medal – third place | 1994 Hiroshima | Middleweight |

Dilshod Yarbekov (born May 1, 1974 in Samarqand) is an Uzbek boxer, who has won medals at the Asian and World Championships in the middleweight category. He is an Honored Sportsman of the Republic of Uzbekistan.

== Achievements ==
- 1994 – Asian Games — Bronze Medal
- 1995 – World Amateur Boxing Championships — Bronze Medal
- 1996 – Central Asian Games — Gold Medal
- 1998 – Asian Games — Silver Medal

At the 2000 Summer Olympics he lost in the first round to Felix Sturm (GER, fighting under his birthname A.Catic)
