= Nariman Ataev =

Uzbekistani boxer (born 1971)

Personal information
- Born: 25 January 1971
- Died: 27 May 2007 (aged 36)
Medal record
Men's Boxing
Representing Uzbekistan
Asian Games
Bronze medal – third place	1994 Hiroshima	Welterweight

Nariman Atayev (25 January 1971 – 27 May 2007) was a boxer from Uzbekistan. He represented his native country at the 1996 Summer Olympics in Atlanta, Georgia, where he was stopped in the quarterfinals of the men's welterweight division (– 67 kg) by Puerto Rico's eventual bronze medalist Daniel Santos.
