= Pramuansak Phosuwan =

Thai boxer (born 1970)

Personal information
- Nationality: Thai
- Born: 22 November 1970 (age 54); Borabue District, Maha Sarakham Province, Thailand

Sport
- Sport: Boxing

Pramuansak Phosuwan (born 22 November 1970) is a Thai boxer. He competed at the 1992 Summer Olympics and the 1996 Summer Olympics.
