= Chen Tao (boxer) =

Chinese boxer (born 1972)

Personal information
- Nationality: Chinese
- Born: 16 December 1972 (age 52)

Sport
- Sport: Boxing

Chen Tao (born 16 December 1972) is a Chinese boxer. He competed in the men's middleweight event at the 1996 Summer Olympics.
