= Lakha Singh (boxer) =

Indian boxer

Personal information
- Nationality: Indian
- Born: 2 January 1965 (age 60)

Sport
- Sport: Boxing

Lakha Singh (born 2 January 1965) is an Indian boxer. He competed in the men's heavyweight event at the 1996 Summer Olympics.
