= Safarish Khan =

Pakistani boxer (born 1970)

Personal information
- Nationality: Pakistani
- Born: 31 March 1970 (age 55)

Sport
- Sport: Boxing

Safarish Khan (born 31 March 1970) is a Pakistani boxer. He competed in the men's super heavyweight event at the 1996 Summer Olympics.
