= Ko Young-sam =

South Korean boxer (born 1971)

Personal information
- Nationality: South Korean
- Born: 7 May 1971 (age 54)

Sport
- Sport: Boxing

Ko Young-sam (born 7 May 1971) is a South Korean boxer. He competed in the men's heavyweight event at the 1996 Summer Olympics.
