= Nemo Bahari =

Indonesian boxer (born 1975)

Personal information
- Nationality: Indonesian
- Born: 23 March 1975 (age 51) Denpasar, Bali, Indonesia

Sport
- Sport: Boxing
Medal record
Men's boxing
Representing Indonesia
Asian Games
Bronze medal – third place	1994 Hiroshima	Featherweight

Nemo Bahari (born 23 March 1975) is an Indonesian boxer. He competed in the men's featherweight event at the 1996 Summer Olympics.
