= Laos at the 1994 Asian Games =

- IOC code: LAO
- NOC: National Olympic Committee of Lao

in Hiroshima
- Medals: Gold 0 Silver 0 Bronze 0 Total 0

Asian Games appearances (overview)
- 1974; 1978; 1982; 1986; 1990; 1994; 1998; 2002; 2006; 2010; 2014; 2018; 2022; 2026

The 1994 Asian Games, also known as XII Asiad, were held from October 2 to October 16, 1994, in Hiroshima, Japan. The main theme of this edition was to promote peace and harmony among Asian nations. It was emphasized by the host because the venue was the site of the atomic bomb attack 49 years earlier. Due to the First Gulf War, Iraq was suspended from the games.

There were a total number of 6,828 athletes and officials involved, from 42 countries, with a total number of 34 events. Debut sports at this edition of the Asiad were baseball, karate and modern pentathlon.

Laos did not earn any medals in the event.
