= India at the 1994 Asian Games =

- IOC code: IND
- NOC: Indian Olympic Association

in Hiroshima
- Flag bearer: Raghubir Singh
- Medals Ranked 8th: Gold 4 Silver 3 Bronze 16 Total 23

Asian Games appearances (overview)
- 1951; 1954; 1958; 1962; 1966; 1970; 1974; 1978; 1982; 1986; 1990; 1994; 1998; 2002; 2006; 2010; 2014; 2018; 2022; 2026

India participated in the 1994 Asian Games held in Hiroshima, Japan from October 2 to October 16, 1994. Ranked 8th with 4 gold medals, 3 silver medals and 15 bronze medals with a total of 22 over-all medals.

== Medals by sport ==
Sport	Gold	Silver	Bronze	Total
Athletics	0	1	2	3
Boxing	0	0	4	4
Canoeing	0	0	1	1
Hockey	0	1	0	1
Judo	0	0	1	1
Kabaddi	1	0	0	1
Rowing	0	0	1	1
Sailing	0	0	2	2
Shooting	1	0	1	2
Tennis	2	0	1	3
Weightlifting	0	1	3	4
Total	4	3	16	23
