= Philippines at the 1994 Asian Games =

- IOC code: PHI
- NOC: Philippine Olympic Committee
- Website: www.olympic.ph (in English)

in Hiroshima
- Medals Ranked 14th: Gold 3 Silver 2 Bronze 8 Total 13

Asian Games appearances (overview)
- 1951; 1954; 1958; 1962; 1966; 1970; 1974; 1978; 1982; 1986; 1990; 1994; 1998; 2002; 2006; 2010; 2014; 2018; 2022; 2026

The Philippines participated in the 1994 Asian Games held in Hiroshima, Japan from October 2 to October 16, 1994. Ranked 14th with 3 gold medals, 2 silver medals and 8 bronze medals with a total of 13 over-all medals.

== Asian Games Performance ==
The Filipinos' triple gold all came in Boxing where Mansueto Velasco, Jr. reigned supreme in the light-flyweight division, Elias Recaido Jr. in the flyweight class, and Reynaldo Galido in the light-welterweight category. The three-two-eight gold-silver-bronze showing turned out to be the seventh best by the country at that time in the 43-year history and 12 Asiad stagings.

== Medalists ==
The following Philippine competitors won medals at the Games.

=== Gold ===
| No. | Medal | Name | Sport | Event |
|---|---|---|---|---|
| 1 | Gold | Mansueto Velasco | Boxing | Light flyweight 48kg |
| 2 | Gold | Elias Recaido | Boxing | Flyweight 51kg |
| 3 | Gold | Reynaldo Galido | Boxing | Light welterweight 63.5kg |

=== Silver ===
| No. | Medal | Name | Sport | Event |
|---|---|---|---|---|
| 1 | Silver | Jorge Fernandez; Paeng Nepomuceno; Rene Reyes; Paulo Valdez; Angelo Constantino | Bowling | Men's Team |
| 2 | Silver | Robert Vargas | Taekwondo | Featherweight -64kg |

=== Bronze ===
| No. | Medal | Name | Sport | Event |
|---|---|---|---|---|
| 1 | Bronze | Elma Muros | Athletics | Women's Long Jump |
| 2 | Bronze | Irene Garcia | Bowling | Women's Masters |
| 3 | Bronze | Anthony Igusquisa | Boxing | Bantamweight 54kg |
| 4 | Bronze | Eric Canoy | Boxing | Featherweight 57kg |
| 5 | Bronze | Richard Lim | Karate | Men's Kata |
| 6 | Bronze | David Lay | Karate | Men's Kumite -65kg |
| 7 | Bronze | Richard Ng | Wushu | Men's Nanquan |
| 8 | Bronze | Daniel Go | Wushu | Men's Taijiquan |

== Medal summary ==
=== Medal by sports ===
| Sport | Gold | Silver | Bronze | Total |
|---|---|---|---|---|
| Boxing | 3 | 0 | 2 | 5 |
| Bowling | 0 | 1 | 1 | 2 |
| Taekwondo | 0 | 1 | 0 | 1 |
| Karate | 0 | 0 | 2 | 2 |
| Wushu | 0 | 0 | 2 | 2 |
| Athletics | 0 | 0 | 1 | 1 |
| Totals (6 entries) | 3 | 2 | 8 | 13 |
