= Mongolia at the 1994 Asian Games =

- IOC code: MGL
- NOC: Mongolian National Olympic Committee

in Incheon
- Competitors: 234
- Medals Ranked 18th: Gold 1 Silver 2 Bronze 6 Total 9

Asian Games appearances (overview)
- 1974; 1978; 1982; 1986; 1990; 1994; 1998; 2002; 2006; 2010; 2014; 2018; 2022; 2026

Mongolia participated in the 1994 Asian Games in Hiroshima, Japan from 2 to 16 October 1994. It won 1 gold, 2 silver and 6 bronze medals.

== Medal summary ==
=== Medalists ===
Medal	Athlete	Sport	Event	Date
Gold	Tserenbaataryn Tsogtbayar	Freestyle wrestling	Men's 57 kg	
Silver	Dorjsürengiin Mönkhbayar	Shooting	10 m air pistol	
Silver	Tumendembereliin Zuunbayan	Freestyle wrestling	Men's 48 kg	
Bronze	Dashgombyn Battulga	Judo	Men's 65 kg	
Bronze	Khaliuny Boldbaatar	Judo	Men's 71 kg	
Bronze	Badmaanyambuugiin Bat-Erdene	Judo	Men's +95 kg	
Bronze	Badmaanyambuugiin Bat-Erdene	Judo	Men's openweight	
Bronze	Sambuugiin Dashdulam	Judo	Women's openweight	
Bronze	Battogtokhyn Bat-Erdene	Freestyle wrestling	Men's 100 kg	
