= Uzbekistan at the 1994 Asian Games =

Uzbekistan at the Asian Games
- IOC code: UZB
- NOC: National Olympic Committee of the Republic of Uzbekistan
- Medals Ranked 5th: Gold 11 Silver 12 Bronze 19 Total 42

Summer appearances
- 1994; 1998; 2002; 2006; 2010; 2014; 2018; 2022; 2026

Winter appearances
- 1996; 1999; 2003; 2007; 2011; 2017; 2025; 2029

Uzbekistan competed in the 1994 Asian Games. It was their first ever post-Soviet appearance in the Asian Games as Uzbekistan. They won a total of 11 golds, 12 silvers, and 19 bronze, including the gold medal that they won in men's association football. They ranked 5th out of the 42 countries that participated in the Asian Games. They won gold medals in Athletics, Boxing, Canoeing, Football, and Shooting. They won the most medals in canoeing, where they won 4 gold, 7 silver, 2 bronze.

There were 25 different individual medalists, and one team.

== Medalists ==
Konstantin Sarnatski
Vladimir Parfyonov
Viktor Zaitsev
Oleg Veretelnikov
Svetlana Munkova
Ramil Ganiyev
Oksana Yarygina
Nariman Ataev
Dilshod Yarbekov
Alisher Avezbaev
Oleg Maskaev
Yevgeny Astanin
Andrey Gorelov
Vitaly Sorokin
Ivan Kireyev
Vladimir Kazantsev
Andrey Kolganov
Anatoly Tyurin
Irina Lyalina
Irina Juravleva
Inna Isakova
Tatiana Levina
Uzbekistan National Football Team
Shukhrat Akhmedov
Enver Osmanov
Nikolay Repichev

== Medal table ==
Sport	Gold	Silver	Bronze	Total
Athletics	3	2	3	8
Canoeing	4	7	2	13
Boxing	2	0	2	4
Football	1	0	0	1
Shooting	1	2	2	5
Total	11	12	19	42

== Athletics ==
A total of 8 medals were won in Athletics. They were won in the Long Jump, javelin throw, and Decathlon for men's events, and medals were won in the High Jump and javelin throw for women's events. The medalists in Athletics were: Konstantin Sarnatski
Vladimir Parfyonov
Viktor Zaitsev
Oleg Veretelnikov
Svetlana Munkova
Ramil Ganiyev
Oksana Yarygina
Nariman Ataev

== Boxing ==
A total of 4 medals were won in Boxing. They were won in the 67 kg Welterweight, the 75 kg middleweight, the 91 kg heavyweight, and the 91+ kg super heavyweight. The medalists in Boxing were: Nariman Ataev
Dilshod Yarbekov
Alisher Avezbaev
Oleg Maskaev

== Canoeing ==
A total of 13 medals were won in canoeing. They were won for men in the C-1 500m, C-1 1000m, C-2 500m, C-2 1000m, K-1 500m, K-1 1000m, K-2 500m, K-2 1000m, K-4 500m, and K-4 1000m. For women, medals were won in the K-1 500m, K-4 500m. They won at least won medal in every single event. Medalists in Canoeing were: Yevgeny Astanin
Andrey Gorelov
Vitaly Sorokin
Ivan Kireyev
Vladimir Kazantsev
Andrey Kolganov
Anatoly Tyurin
Irina Lyalina
Irina Juravleva
Inna Isakova
Tatiana Levina

== Football ==
A total of 1 gold medal was won in Football. The Uzbekistan National Football team won the gold medal in the men's team competition in football.

== Shooting ==
A total of 5 medals were won in shooting. They were all won in men's events. The events were the 10m air pistol team, the 25m center fire pistol, the 25m center fire pistol team, the 25m standard pistol team, and the 50m pistol team. Medalists in shooting were:
Shukhrat Akhmedov
Enver Osmanov
Nikolay Repichev
