= Pakistan at the 1994 Asian Games =

- IOC code: PAK
- NOC: Pakistan Olympic Association

in Hiroshima, Japan
- Medals Ranked 22th: Gold 0 Silver 4 Bronze 6 Total 10

Asian Games appearances (overview)
- 1954; 1958; 1962; 1966; 1970; 1974; 1978; 1982; 1986; 1990; 1994; 1998; 2002; 2006; 2010; 2014; 2018; 2022; 2026

Pakistan participated in the 1994 Asian Games in Hiroshima, Japan from 2 to 16 October 1994. It ranked 22nd in the medal tally. Half of its total medals were in boxing, with Pakistani boxers winning 3 silver and 2 bronze medals. These Games marked the first occasion that the competitors from Pakistan did not win a gold medal.
