= South Korea at the 1994 Asian Games =

- IOC code: KOR
- NOC: Korean Olympic Committee

in Hiroshima
- Competitors: 558 in 31 sports
- Officials: 167
- Medals Ranked 3rd: Gold 63 Silver 56 Bronze 64 Total 183

Asian Games appearances (overview)
- 1954; 1958; 1962; 1966; 1970; 1974; 1978; 1982; 1986; 1990; 1994; 1998; 2002; 2006; 2010; 2014; 2018; 2022; 2026

South Korea (IOC designation:Korea) participated in the 1994 Asian Games held in Hiroshima, Japan from October 2 to October 16, 1994.

== Medal summary ==
=== Medal table ===
Sport	Gold	Silver	Bronze	Total
Wrestling	9	1	6	16
Shooting	7	8	9	24
Judo	7	3	4	14
Bowling	4	4	3	11
Badminton	4	3	1	8
Taekwondo	4	0	0	4
Athletics	3	3	3	9
Archery	3	2	2	7
Fencing	2	3	4	9
Gymnastics	2	3	2	7
Weightlifting	2	3	2	7
Soft tennis	2	3	0	5
Cycling	2	2	1	5
Swimming	2	1	4	7
Boxing	2	1	0	3
Field hockey	2	0	0	2
Handball	2	0	0	2
Table tennis	1	3	4	8
Modern pentathlon	1	1	1	3
Basketball	1	1	0	2
Volleyball	1	0	1	2
Canoeing	0	2	5	7
Golf	0	2	2	4
Tennis	0	2	2	4
Rowing	0	1	3	4
Equestrian	0	1	1	2
Sailing	0	1	1	2
Wushu	0	1	1	2
Baseball	0	1	0	1
Synchronized swimming	0	0	2	2
Totals (30 entries)	63	56	64	183
