= China at the 1994 Asian Games =

- IOC code: CHN
- NOC: Chinese Olympic Committee external link (in Chinese and English)

in Hiroshima
- Medals Ranked 1st: Gold 125 Silver 83 Bronze 58 Total 266

Asian Games appearances (overview)
- 1974; 1978; 1982; 1986; 1990; 1994; 1998; 2002; 2006; 2010; 2014; 2018; 2022; 2026

China competed in the 1994 Asian Games which were held in Hiroshima, Japan from October 2, 1994 to October 16, 1994. It won 125 gold, 83 silver and 58 bronze medals.

== See also ==
- China at the Asian Games
- China at the Olympics
- Sport in China
