= Japan at the 1994 Asian Games =

- IOC code: JPN
- NOC: Japanese Olympic Committee

in Hiroshima
- Competitors: 678 in 34 sports
- Flag bearer: Motoko Obayashi
- Medals Ranked 2nd: Gold 64 Silver 75 Bronze 79 Total 218

Asian Games appearances (overview)
- 1951; 1954; 1958; 1962; 1966; 1970; 1974; 1978; 1982; 1986; 1990; 1994; 1998; 2002; 2006; 2010; 2014; 2018; 2022; 2026

Japan participated and hosted the 1994 Asian Games held in Hiroshima, Japan from October 2, 1994 to October 16, 1994. This country was ranked 2nd with 64 gold medals, 75 silver medals and 79 bronze medals with a total of 218 medals to secure its second spot in the medal tally.
