= Kazakhstan at the 1994 Asian Games =

- IOC code: KAZ
- NOC: National Olympic Committee of the Republic of Kazakhstan

in Hiroshima
- Competitors: 118 in 22 sports
- Medals Ranked 4th: Gold 27 Silver 25 Bronze 27 Total 79

Asian Games appearances (overview)
- 1994; 1998; 2002; 2006; 2010; 2014; 2018; 2022; 2026

Kazakhstan participated in the 1994 Asian Games from October 2 to October 16, 1994 in Hiroshima, Japan, which was the country's first appearance at the Asian Games since gaining independence.
