= 1994 Asian Games =

Multi-sport event in Hiroshima, Japan

XII Asian Games
- Host city: Hiroshima, Japan
- Motto: Asian Harmony
- Nations: 42
- Athletes: 6,828
- Events: 337 in 34 sports
- Opening: 2 October 1994
- Closing: 16 October 1994
- Opened by: Akihito; Emperor of Japan
- Closed by: Ahmad Al-Fahad Al-Sabah; President of the Olympic Council of Asia
- Athlete's Oath: Ryohei Koba
- Torch lighter: Aki Ichijo; Yasunori Uchitomi
- Main venue: Hiroshima Park Main Stadium
- Website: hiroshima-cu.ac.jp (archived)

Summer

Winter

The 1994 Asian Games (1994年アジア競技大会), also known as the XII Asiad and the 12th Asian Games (第12回アジア競技大会) or simply Hiroshima 1994 (広島1994), were held from October 2 to 16, 1994, in Hiroshima, Japan. It was the first Asian Games in history to be hosted in a non-capital city. The main theme of this edition was to promote peace and harmony among Asian nations. This concept was used due to the historical fact that the city was the site of the first atomic bomb attack 49 years earlier. Due to the 1991 Gulf War, Iraq was suspended from the games and North Korea did not participate owing to the country being amidst a three-year period of national mourning after the death of their founding leader Kim Il-sung on 8 July, as they previously boycotted the 1986 games and the 1988 Summer Olympics which both held in the South Korean capital Seoul. The games debuted the five Asian former republics of the Soviet Union: Kazakhstan, Kyrgyzstan, Tajikistan, Turkmenistan, and Uzbekistan while Cambodia made a comeback to the games after they last participated in 1962.

There were a total number of 6,828 athletes and officials involved, from 42 countries, with a total number of 34 sports. Debut sports at this edition of the Asiad were baseball, karate and modern pentathlon.

== Bidding process ==
In 1983, two cities in Asia demonstrated interest to host the 1990 Asian Games, one was Beijing in the People's Republic of China and the other was Hiroshima in Japan. The two interest parties presented their projects before an Olympic Council of Asia committee, during a meeting of the same, during the following year in Seoul, that also served as a previous meeting to evaluate the preparations of the city for the next Asian Games and also for the 1988 Summer Olympics. Beijing eventually won the right to host the 1990 edition. However, the Japanese authorities were unaware of the Chinese proposal until this date and were surprised by the option for the capital of China. Nevertheless, the Japanese proposal was extremely praised to the point that the OCA invited the city to host the following Games in 1994.

34 votes were needed for selection.

1990 Asian Games bidding result
City	Country	Votes
Beijing	China	44
Hiroshima	Japan	23

== Marketing ==
=== Logo ===
The emblem of the games is an abstract image of a dove, symbol of peace, which resembles the letter 'H' initial as in the host city name Hiroshima, reflecting Hiroshima's desire for peace. The OCA emblem is the symbol of Asian Games as a whole which resembles athlete in motion.

=== Mascot ===
Official mascots

The official mascot of the XII Asiad is a pair of white doves. Poppo and Cuccu, male and female respectively, represent peace and harmony – the main theme of this edition of the Asian Games. They were designed by well-known manga artist and character designer Susumu Matsushita.

== Participating nations ==
National Olympic Committees (NOCs) are named according to their official IOC designations and arranged according to their official IOC country codes in 1994.

- Afghanistan (4)
- Bahrain (28)
- Bangladesh (10)
- Bhutan (7)
- Brunei (6)
- Cambodia (18)
- China (568)
- Chinese Taipei (77)
- Hong Kong (109)
- India (146)
- Indonesia (117)
- Iran (135)
- Japan (678)
- Jordan (25)
- Kazakhstan (118)
- Kuwait (13)
- Kyrgyzstan (8)
- Laos (4)
- Lebanon (7)
- Macau (2)
- Malaysia (126)
- Maldives (5)
- Mongolia (26)
- Myanmar (12)
- Nepal (91)
- Oman (54)
- Pakistan (119)
- Palestine (1)
- Philippines
- Qatar (103)
- Saudi Arabia (65)
- Singapore (142)
- South Korea (558)
- Sri Lanka (11)
- Syria (7)
- Tajikistan (15)
- Thailand
- Turkmenistan (16)
- United Arab Emirates
- Uzbekistan (143)
- Vietnam
- Yemen

== Sports ==
- Archery (4)
- Athletics (43)
- Badminton (7)
- Baseball (1)
- Basketball (2)
- Bowling (12)
- Boxing (12)
- Canoeing (13)
- Cycling (10)
  - Road
  - Track
- Equestrian (4)
- Fencing (8)
- Field hockey (2)
- Football (2)
- Golf (4)
- Gymnastics (15)
  - Artistic
  - Rhythmic
- Handball (2)
- Judo (16)
- Kabaddi (1)
- Karate (11)
- Modern pentathlon (2)
- Rowing (12)
- Sailing (7)
- Sepak takraw (1)
- Shooting (34)
- Softball (1)
- Soft tennis (4)
- Swimming
  - Diving (4)
  - Swimming (31)
  - Synchronized swimming (2)
  - Water polo (1)
- Table tennis (7)
- Taekwondo (8)
- Tennis (7)
- Volleyball (2)
- Weightlifting (19)
- Wrestling (20)
- Wushu (6)

== Calendar ==
OC	Opening ceremony	●	Event competitions	1	Event finals	CC	Closing ceremony

October 1994		1st Sat	2nd Sun	3rd Mon	4th Tue	5th Wed	6th Thu	7th Fri	8th Sat	9th Sun	10th Mon	11th Tue	12th Wed	13th Thu	14th Fri	15th Sat	16th Sun	Gold medals
Ceremonies			OC														CC	
Archery							●	●	1	1	2							4
Athletics										2	4	7	3		10	9	8	43
Badminton								●	●	2		●	●	●	●	5		7
Baseball										●	●	●		●	1			1
Basketball				●	●	●	●	●	●	●	●		●	1	●	1		2
Bowling						2	2	●	2	4	●	2						12
Boxing					●	●	●	●	●	●	●	●		12				12
Canoeing						●	●	●	●	7	6							13
Cycling	Road									1						2		3
Cycling	Track											●	2	2	3			7
Equestrian				1		1		1		1								4
Fencing				1	1	1	1	1	1	1	1							8
Field hockey				●	●	●	●	●	●	●	●	●	●	●	1	1		2
Football		●		●	●	●	●	●		●	●	●	1	●		●	1	2
Golf							●	●	●	4								4
Gymnastics	Artistic			1	1	2	10											14
Gymnastics	Rhythmic									●	1							1
Handball						●	●	●	●	●	●	●	●	1	1			2
Judo													4	4	4	4		16
Kabaddi													●	●	1			1
Karate				4	4	3												11
Modern pentathlon										●	●	2						2
Rowing								●	●	●	12							12
Sailing					●	●	●	●		●	●	7						7
Sepak takraw													●	●	●	1		1
Shooting								4	6	4	2	4	4	6	4			34
Soft tennis											●	●	2	●	2			4
Softball				●	●	●	●	1										1
Swimming	Diving			●	2	●	2											4
Swimming	Swimming			4	5	5	5	6	6									31
Swimming	Synchronized swimming								●	2								2
Swimming	Water polo											●	●	●	●	1		1
Table tennis						●	●	●	1	1		●	●	3	2			7
Taekwondo									4	4								8
Tennis				●	●	●	1	1	●	●		●	●	5				7
Volleyball				●	●	●	●	1		●	●	●	●	●		●	1	2
Weightlifting				3	3	3	2	2	2	2	2							19
Wrestling					●	5	5		●	5	5							20
Wushu													1	2	3			6
Total gold medals				14	16	22	28	17	23	41	35	22	17	36	32	24	10	337
October 1994		1st Sat	2nd Sun	3rd Mon	4th Tue	5th Wed	6th Thu	7th Fri	8th Sat	9th Sun	10th Mon	11th Tue	12th Wed	13th Thu	14th Fri	15th Sat	16th Sun	Gold medals

== Medal table ==
The top ten ranked NOCs at these Games are listed below. The host nation, Japan, is highlighted.

* Host nation (Japan)

Rank	Nation	Gold	Silver	Bronze	Total
1	China (CHN)	125	83	58	266
2	Japan (JPN)*	64	75	79	218
3	South Korea (KOR)	63	56	64	183
4	Kazakhstan (KAZ)	27	25	27	79
5	Uzbekistan (UZB)	11	12	19	42
6	Iran (IRI)	9	9	8	26
7	Chinese Taipei (TPE)	7	13	24	44
8	India (IND)	4	3	16	23
9	Malaysia (MAS)	4	2	13	19
10	Qatar (QAT)	4	1	5	10
11–32	Remaining	20	58	91	169
Totals (32 entries)		338	337	404	1,079

== Doping scandal ==
The Chinese had 11 athletes test positive for banned drugs and anabolic steroids at the 1994 Asian Games. Less than a month before the Asian Games, a scandal at the 1994 World Aquatics Championships in Rome, when the Chinese had won 12 of the 16 women's swimming titles, with two of those nine world champions among those who tested positive at the Asian games.

Preceded by Beijing	Asian Games; Hiroshima; XII Asian Games (1994)	Succeeded by Bangkok
