= List of Asian Games medalists in cycling =

This is the complete list of Asian Games medalists in cycling from 1951 to 2026.

== BMX ==
=== Men's freestyle ===
Games	Gold	Silver	Bronze
2026 Aichi–Nagoya	Rim Nakamura (JPN)	Kaede Ozawa (JPN)	Sha Xiaolong (CHN)

=== Men's racing ===
Games	Gold	Silver	Bronze
2010 Guangzhou	Steven Wong (HKG)	Akifumi Sakamoto (JPN)	Masahiro Sampei (JPN)
2014 Incheon	Daniel Caluag (PHI)	Masahiro Sampei (JPN)	Zhu Yan (CHN)
2018 Jakarta–Palembang	Yoshitaku Nagasako (JPN)	I Gusti Bagus Saputra (INA)	Daniel Caluag (PHI)
2022 Hangzhou	Asuma Nakai (JPN)	Komet Sukprasert (THA)	Patrick Coo (PHI)
2026 Aichi–Nagoya	Asuma Nakai (JPN)	Hyoga Kiuchi (JPN)	Lin Haochao (CHN)

=== Women's freestyle ===
Games	Gold	Silver	Bronze
2026 Aichi–Nagoya	Sun Sibei (CHN)	Miharu Ozawa (JPN)	Sun Jiaqi (CHN)

=== Women's racing ===
Games	Gold	Silver	Bronze
2010 Guangzhou	Ma Liyun (CHN)	Ayaka Miwa (JPN)	Yue Cong (CHN)
2014 Incheon	Amanda Carr (THA)	Lu Yan (CHN)	Peng Na (CHN)
2018 Jakarta–Palembang	Zhang Yaru (CHN)	Chutikan Kitwanitsathian (THA)	Wiji Lestari (INA)
2022 Hangzhou	Amellya Nur Sifa (INA)	Gu Quanquan (CHN)	Jasmine Azzahra Setyobudi (INA)
2026 Aichi–Nagoya	Sae Hatakeyama (JPN)	Liao Wanyi (CHN)	Jasmine Azzahra Setyobudi (INA)

== Mountain bike ==
=== Men's cross-country ===
Games	Gold	Silver	Bronze
1998 Bangkok	Akihito Udagawa (JPN)	Surajit Jirojwong (THA)	Li Fuyu (CHN)
2002 Busan	Kenji Takeya (JPN)	Zhu Yongbiao (CHN)	Li Fuyu (CHN)
2010 Guangzhou	Chan Chun Hing (HKG)	Kohei Yamamoto (JPN)	Duan Zhiqiang (CHN)
2014 Incheon	Wang Zhen (CHN)	Chan Chun Hing (HKG)	Kohei Yamamoto (JPN)
2018 Jakarta–Palembang	Ma Hao (CHN)	Lü Xianjing (CHN)	Kirill Kazantsev (KAZ)
2022 Hangzhou	Mi Jiujiang (CHN)	Yuan Jinwei (CHN)	Toki Sawada (JPN)

=== Men's downhill ===
Games	Gold	Silver	Bronze
1998 Bangkok	Phannarong Kongsamut (THA)	Takashi Tsukamoto (JPN)	Brian Cook (HKG)
2002 Busan	Jung Hyung-rae (KOR)	Takashi Tsukamoto (JPN)	Ryo Uchijima (JPN)
2018 Jakarta–Palembang	Khoiful Mukhib (INA)	Chiang Sheng-shan (TPE)	Suebsakun Sukchanya (THA)

=== Women's cross-country ===
Games	Gold	Silver	Bronze
1998 Bangkok	Ma Yanping (CHN)	Kanako Kobayashi (JPN)	Chantana Singupatham (THA)
2002 Busan	Ma Yanping (CHN)	Yukari Nakagome (JPN)	Zhang Na (CHN)
2010 Guangzhou	Ren Chengyuan (CHN)	Shi Qinglan (CHN)	Rie Katayama (JPN)
2014 Incheon	Shi Qinglan (CHN)	Yang Ling (CHN)	Yukari Nakagome (JPN)
2018 Jakarta–Palembang	Yao Bianwa (CHN)	Li Hongfeng (CHN)	Natalie Panyawan (THA)
2022 Hangzhou	Li Hongfeng (CHN)	Ma Caixia (CHN)	Faranak Partoazar (IRI)

=== Women's downhill ===
Games	Gold	Silver	Bronze
1998 Bangkok	Sachiko Kamakura (JPN)	Mami Masuda (JPN)	Chen Ju-miao (TPE)
2002 Busan	Mio Suemasa (JPN)	Mami Masuda (JPN)	Risa Suseanty (INA)
2018 Jakarta–Palembang	Tiara Andini Prastika (INA)	Vipavee Deekaballes (THA)	Nining Porwaningsih (INA)

== Road ==
=== Men's road race ===
Games	Gold	Silver	Bronze
1951 New Delhi	Kihei Tomioka (JPN)	Yuji Tachiiri (JPN)	Takeo Sato (JPN)
1958 Tokyo	Lee Hong-bok (KOR)	Ro Do-chon (KOR)	Kim Ho-soon (KOR)
1962 Jakarta	Taworn Jirapan (THA)	Masashi Omiya (JPN)	Won Chung-ho (KOR)
1966 Bangkok	Pairote Roongtonkit (THA)	Ahn Byung-hoon (KOR)	Choochart Warawoot (THA)
1970 Bangkok	Ng Joo Ngan (MAL)	Masato Abe (JPN)	Jung Chong-jin (KOR)
1974 Tehran	Hassan Arianfard (IRN)	Gholam Hossein Kouhi (IRN)	Behrouz Rahbar (IRN)
1978 Bangkok	Yoshitaka Nihei (JPN)	Saleem Shanati (IRQ)	Jiang Ming (CHN)
1982 New Delhi	Park Se-ryong (KOR)	Tsedendambyn Ganbold (MGL)	Ali Zangiabadi (IRN)
1986 Seoul	Shin Dae-chul (KOR)	Fanny Gunawan (INA)	Oh Yoon-hwan (KOR)
1990 Beijing	Tang Xuezhong (CHN)	Wang Shusen (CHN)	Dashnyamyn Tömör-Ochir (MGL)
1994 Hiroshima	Andrey Kivilev (KAZ)	Alexander Vinokourov (KAZ)	Tang Xuezhong (CHN)
1998 Bangkok	Wong Kam Po (HKG)	Makoto Iijima (JPN)	Victor Espiritu (PHI)
2002 Busan	Sergey Krushevskiy (UZB)	Alexander Vinokourov (KAZ)	Wong Kam Po (HKG)
2006 Doha	Wong Kam Po (HKG)	Mehdi Sohrabi (IRI)	Park Sung-baek (KOR)
2010 Guangzhou	Wong Kam Po (HKG)	Takashi Miyazawa (JPN)	Zou Rongxi (CHN)
2014 Incheon	Jang Kyung-gu (KOR)	Arvin Moazzami (IRI)	Leung Chun Wing (HKG)
2018 Jakarta–Palembang	Alexey Lutsenko (KAZ)	Fumiyuki Beppu (JPN)	Navuti Liphongyu (THA)
2022 Hangzhou	Yevgeniy Fedorov (KAZ)	Alexey Lutsenko (KAZ)	Sainbayaryn Jambaljamts (MGL)

=== Men's open road race ===
Games	Gold	Silver	Bronze
1962 Jakarta	Hendrik Brocks (INA)	Wanchai Wilasineekul (THA)	Aming Priatna (INA)

=== Men's individual time trial ===
Games	Gold	Silver	Bronze
1998 Bangkok	Ghader Mizbani (IRI)	Dmitriy Fofonov (KAZ)	Pavel Nevdakh (KAZ)
2002 Busan	Andrey Teteryuk (KAZ)	Eugen Wacker (KGZ)	Sergey Krushevskiy (UZB)
2006 Doha	Song Baoqing (CHN)	Eugen Wacker (KGZ)	Andrey Mizurov (KAZ)
2010 Guangzhou	Choe Hyeong-min (KOR)	Eugen Wacker (KGZ)	Hossein Askari (IRI)
2014 Incheon	Alexey Lutsenko (KAZ)	Eugen Wacker (KGZ)	Hossein Askari (IRI)
2018 Jakarta–Palembang	Alexey Lutsenko (KAZ)	Muradjan Khalmuratov (UZB)	Fumiyuki Beppu (JPN)
2022 Hangzhou	Alexey Lutsenko (KAZ)	Xue Ming (CHN)	Vincent Lau (HKG)

=== Men's team road race ===
Games	Gold	Silver	Bronze
1958 Tokyo	South Korea (KOR); Im Sang-jo; Kim Ho-soon; Lee Hong-bok; Ro Do-chon	Japan (JPN); Katsuro Hoshi; Hiroshi Iida; Akihiko Shiomi; Yaezo Takahashi; Takehiko Tokumasu; Setsuo Wakabayashi	South Vietnam (VNM); Lê Văn Trọng; Ngô Thành Liêm; Trần Văn Nay; Trần Văn Nên
1962 Jakarta	Indonesia (INA); Hendrik Brocks; Aming Priatna; Wahju Wahdini	Thailand (THA); Taworn Jirapan; Pitaya Kirdtubtin; Wanchai Wilasineekul	Malaya (MAL); Rosli Abdul Kadir; Jaafar Bibon; Mohamad Jaafar
1966 Bangkok	South Korea (KOR); Ahn Byung-hoon; Ahn Kwang-san; Lee Sun-bai	Thailand (THA); Pairote Roongtonkit; Chainarong Sophonpong; Choochart Warawoot	South Vietnam (VNM); Đào Văn Nam; Phạm Văn Thanh; Trần Gia Thu
1970 Bangkok	South Korea (KOR); Cho Sung-hwan; Hwang Bo-youn; Jung Chong-jin; Yoo Jae-myung	Malaysia (MAL); Chow Teck Beng; Ng Joo Ngan; Azizan Ramli; Omar Haji Saad	Japan (JPN); Masato Abe; Toru Miyaichi; Takao Ono; Terue Yoshida

=== Men's team time trial ===
Games	Gold	Silver	Bronze
1962 Jakarta	Indonesia (INA); Hendrik Brocks; Wahju Wahdini; Hasjim Roesli; Aming Priatna	South Korea (KOR); Shin Ki-chul; Ahn Byung-hoon; Song Ung-il; Won Chung-ho	Thailand (THA); Wanchai Wilasineekul; Preeda Chullamondhol; Smaisuk Krisansuwan; Pitaya Kirdtubtin
1966 Bangkok	Japan (JPN); Yoshiharu Kubo; Kozo Nishimura; Takao Ono	South Korea (KOR); Ahn Byung-hoon; Cho Sung-hwan; Lee Sun-bai	Iran (IRN); Davoud Akhlaghi; Mehdi Doukchi; Esmaeil Hosseini
1970 Bangkok	Japan (JPN); Masato Abe; Toru Miyaichi; Takao Ono; Terue Yoshida	Iran (IRN); Hassan Arianfard; Hossein Baharloo; Asghar Darroudi; Khosro Haghgosha	South Korea (KOR); Cho Sung-hwan; Chun Sung-kook; Jung Chong-jin; Yoo Jae-myung
1974 Tehran	Iran (IRN); Hassan Arianfard; Khosro Haghgosha; Gholam Hossein Kouhi; Esmaeil Zeinali	Japan (JPN)	Mongolia (MGL); Sh. Jambal; S. Jamiyan; D. Törtogtokh; Shirnengiin Yondondash
1978 Bangkok	Japan (JPN); Yoshitaka Nihei; Toshiaki Nishizawa; Tsutomu Okabori; Katsuji Teraguchi	South Korea (KOR); Lee Young-kyu; Shin In-soo; Shin Nam-soo; Yang Joon-seng	China (CHN); Guo Demao; Li Jianmin; Sun Zhanbo; Wu Zengren
1982 New Delhi	South Korea (KOR); Jang Yun-ho; Kim Byung-sun; Kim Chul-seok; Lee Jin-ok	Japan (JPN); Masatoshi Ichikawa; Hiroki Sekine; Matsuyoshi Takahashi; Masatomo Yabe	Iran (IRN); Mehrdad Afsharian; Abolfazl Khandaghi; Mohammad Ali Mohammadi; Ali Zangiabadi
1986 Seoul	China (CHN); Guo Longchen; Han Shuxiang; Wu Weipei; Zhang Zhonglu	Japan (JPN); Toshimi Sato; Kyoshi Miura; Matsuyoshi Takahashi; Hiroshi Daimon	South Korea (KOR); Kim Chul-seok; Jang Yun-ho; Kim Kwang-pil; Lee Jin-ok
1990 Beijing	China (CHN); Guo Longchen; Liu Hong; Tang Xuezhong; Wu Weipei	Mongolia (MGL); Damdinjamtsyn Jargalsaikhan; Batsükhiin Khayankhyarvaa; Dashjamtsyn Mönkhbat; Dashnyamyn Tömör-Ochir	South Korea (KOR); Cho Duk-haeng; Chung Rai-jin; Kwon Jung-ho; Park Myung-soon
1994 Hiroshima	Kazakhstan (KAZ); Sergey Lavrenenko; Andrey Mizurov; Mikhail Teteryuk; Alexander Vinokourov	China (CHN); Pan Guangchun; Tang Xuezhong; Wang Zhengquan; Zhu Zhengjun	Kyrgyzstan (KGZ); Dmitriy Chentsov; Aleksandr Dyadichkin; Aleksandr Kaikin; Evgeny Tuzkov
2006 Doha	Kazakhstan (KAZ); Ilya Chernyshov; Alexandr Dymovskikh; Dmitriy Gruzdev; Andrey Mizurov	Iran (IRI); Hossein Askari; Alireza Haghi; Ghader Mizbani; Abbas Saeidi Tanha	Japan (JPN); Yoshiyuki Abe; Kazuya Okazaki; Satoshi Hirose; Kazuhiro Mori

=== Women's road race ===
Games	Gold	Silver	Bronze
1986 Seoul	Kim Kyung-sook (KOR)	Wang Li (CHN)	Son Yak-sun (KOR)
1990 Beijing	Lu Suyan (CHN)	Zhang Shuzhen (CHN)	Kyung Mi-ok (KOR)
1994 Hiroshima	Guo Xinghong (CHN)	Zhao Haijuan (CHN)	Wang Shuqing (CHN)
1998 Bangkok	Banna Kamfoo (THA)	Kaori Sakashita (JPN)	Wang Shuqing (CHN)
2002 Busan	Kim Yong-mi (KOR)	Uyun Muzizah (INA)	Jiang Yanxia (CHN)
2006 Doha	Mayuko Hagiwara (JPN)	Zhao Na (CHN)	Han Song-hee (KOR)
2010 Guangzhou	Hsiao Mei-yu (TPE)	Santia Tri Kusuma (INA)	Zhao Na (CHN)
2014 Incheon	Jutatip Maneephan (THA)	Nguyễn Thị Thật (VIE)	Hsiao Mei-yu (TPE)
2018 Jakarta–Palembang	Na Ah-reum (KOR)	Pu Yixian (CHN)	Eri Yonamine (JPN)
2022 Hangzhou	Yang Qianyu (HKG)	Na Ah-reum (KOR)	Jutatip Maneephan (THA)

=== Women's individual time trial ===
Games	Gold	Silver	Bronze
1998 Bangkok	Zhao Haijuan (CHN)	Ma Huizhen (CHN)	Ayumu Otsuka (JPN)
2002 Busan	Li Meifang (CHN)	Ayumu Otsuka (JPN)	Lee Eun-joo (KOR)
2006 Doha	Li Meifang (CHN)	Zulfiya Zabirova (KAZ)	Lee Min-hye (KOR)
2010 Guangzhou	Lee Min-hye (KOR)	Jiang Fan (CHN)	Chanpeng Nontasin (THA)
2014 Incheon	Na Ah-reum (KOR)	Li Wenjuan (CHN)	Jamie Wong (HKG)
2018 Jakarta–Palembang	Na Ah-reum (KOR)	Eri Yonamine (JPN)	Leung Wing Yee (HKG)
2022 Hangzhou	Olga Zabelinskaya (UZB)	Eri Yonamine (JPN)	Rinata Sultanova (KAZ)

== Men's track ==
=== Sprint ===
Games	Gold	Silver	Bronze
1951 New Delhi	Takeo Sato (JPN)	Shoichiro Sugihara (JPN)	Rohinton Noble (IND)
1958 Tokyo	Seiki Hirama (JPN)	Jafar Goltalab (IRN)	Muhammad Shahrukh (PAK)
1974 Tehran	Shinpei Okajima (JPN)	Motomi Shimamoto (JPN)	Noh Hae-soo (KOR)
1978 Bangkok	Yoshikazu Cho (JPN)	Takashi Ebina (JPN)	Park Il-woo (KOR)
1982 New Delhi	Tsutomu Sakamoto (JPN)	Katsuo Nakatake (JPN)	Kim Young-soo (KOR)
1986 Seoul	Norichika Shirai (JPN)	Hiroshi Toyooka (JPN)	Um Young-sup (KOR)
1990 Beijing	Hideki Miwa (JPN)	Hiroshi Toyooka (JPN)	Toshinobu Saito (JPN)
1994 Hiroshima	Toshinobu Saito (JPN)	Hyun Byung-chul (KOR)	Toshiyuki Ono (JPN)
1998 Bangkok	Yuichiro Kamiyama (JPN)	Noriaki Mabuchi (JPN)	Hyun Byung-chul (KOR)
2002 Busan	Takashi Kaneko (JPN)	Josiah Ng (MAS)	Akihiro Isezaki (JPN)
2006 Doha	Tsubasa Kitatsuru (JPN)	Choi Lae-seon (KOR)	Tang Qi (CHN)
2010 Guangzhou	Zhang Lei (CHN)	Tsubasa Kitatsuru (JPN)	Yudai Nitta (JPN)
2014 Incheon	Seiichiro Nakagawa (JPN)	Tomoyuki Kawabata (JPN)	Bao Saifei (CHN)
2018 Jakarta–Palembang	Azizulhasni Awang (MAS)	Tomohiro Fukaya (JPN)	Im Chae-bin (KOR)
2022 Hangzhou	Kaiya Ota (JPN)	Zhou Yu (CHN)	Shah Firdaus Sahrom (MAS)

=== 1 km time trial ===
Games	Gold	Silver	Bronze
1951 New Delhi	Shoichiro Sugihara (JPN)	Ryo Ishikawa (JPN)	Netai Chand Bysack (IND)
1958 Tokyo	Tetsuo Osawa (JPN)	Jafar Goltalab (IRN)	Trần Văn Nên (VNM)
1966 Bangkok	Preeda Chullamondhol (THA)	Takao Shimomura (JPN)	Fan Yue-tao (ROC)
1970 Bangkok	Takafumi Matsuda (JPN)	Kim Kwang-sun (KOR)	Daud Ibrahim (MAL)
1974 Tehran	Shinpei Okajima (JPN)	Lee Kwan-sun (KOR)	Zhang Lihua (CHN)
1978 Bangkok	Lee Kwan-sun (KOR)	Takashi Ebina (JPN)	Zhang Lihua (CHN)
1982 New Delhi	Tsutomu Sakamoto (JPN)	Kim Young-soo (KOR)	Rodolfo Guaves (PHI)
1986 Seoul	Mitsuo Ishii (JPN)	Um Young-sup (KOR)	Wang Jifu (CHN)
1990 Beijing	Keiji Kojima (JPN)	Hiroshi Toyooka (JPN)	Um Young-sup (KOR)
1994 Hiroshima	Masanaga Shiohara (JPN)	Hong Suk-hwan (KOR)	Won Chang-yong (KOR)
1998 Bangkok	Ji Sung-hwan (KOR)	Takanobu Jumonji (JPN)	Chen Keng-hsien (TPE)
2002 Busan	Lin Chih-hsan (TPE)	Keiichi Omori (JPN)	Kim Chi-bum (KOR)
2006 Doha	Feng Yong (CHN)	Yusho Oikawa (JPN)	Kang Dong-jin (KOR)

=== Keirin ===
Games	Gold	Silver	Bronze
2002 Busan	Shinichi Ota (JPN)	Yuji Yamada (JPN)	Hyun Byung-chul (KOR)
2006 Doha	Kang Dong-jin (KOR)	Josiah Ng (MAS)	Hiroyuki Inagaki (JPN)
2010 Guangzhou	Azizulhasni Awang (MAS)	Josiah Ng (MAS)	Zhang Miao (CHN)
2014 Incheon	Mohammad Daneshvar (IRI)	Kazunari Watanabe (JPN)	Josiah Ng (MAS)
2018 Jakarta–Palembang	Jai Angsuthasawit (THA)	Yudai Nitta (JPN)	Azizulhasni Awang (MAS)
2022 Hangzhou	Zhou Yu (CHN)	Kang Seo-jun (KOR)	Shah Firdaus Sahrom (MAS)

=== Individual pursuit ===
Games	Gold	Silver	Bronze
1966 Bangkok	Preeda Chullamondhol (THA)	Masayuki Goto (JPN)	Esmaeil Hosseini (IRN)
1970 Bangkok	Kenichi Ono (JPN)	Kwon Jung-hyun (KOR)	Suriya Saechia (THA)
1974 Tehran	Yoichi Machishima (JPN)	Kim Sang-soo (KOR)	Khosro Haghgosha (IRN)
1978 Bangkok	Toshiaki Ikeura (JPN)	Park Il-woo (KOR)	Xu Yongqing (CHN)
1982 New Delhi	Mitsugi Sarudate (JPN)	Kim Ju-seok (KOR)	Liu Xuezhong (CHN)
1986 Seoul	Yoshihiro Tsumuraya (JPN)	Koichi Azuma (JPN)	Mehrdad Afsharian (IRN)
1990 Beijing	Park Min-soo (KOR)	Masamitsu Ehara (JPN)	Chou Tsung-te (TPE)
1994 Hiroshima	Vadim Kravchenko (KAZ)	Eugen Wacker (KGZ)	Guo Longchen (CHN)
1998 Bangkok	Vadim Kravchenko (KAZ)	Noriyuki Iijima (JPN)	Eugen Wacker (KGZ)
2002 Busan	Vadim Kravchenko (KAZ)	Suh Seok-kyu (KOR)	Noriyuki Iijima (JPN)
2006 Doha	Jang Sun-jae (KOR)	Taiji Nishitani (JPN)	Hwang In-hyeok (KOR)
2010 Guangzhou	Jang Sun-jae (KOR)	Cheung King Lok (HKG)	Li Wei (CHN)
2018 Jakarta–Palembang	Park Sang-hoon (KOR)	Ryo Chikatani (JPN)	Artyom Zakharov (KAZ)

=== Points race ===
Games	Gold	Silver	Bronze
1982 New Delhi	Akira Bando (JPN)	Matsuyoshi Takahashi (JPN)	Edgardo Pagarigan (PHI)
1986 Seoul	Ali Zangiabadi (IRN)	Yuichiro Kamiyama (JPN)	Bernardo Rimarim (PHI)
1990 Beijing	Park Min-soo (KOR)	Hsu Jui-te (TPE)	Daisuke Imanaka (JPN)
1994 Hiroshima	Cho Ho-sung (KOR)	Vadim Kravchenko (KAZ)	Akihiro Osawa (JPN)
1998 Bangkok	Sergey Lavrenenko (KAZ)	Cho Ho-sung (KOR)	Amir Zargari (IRI)
2002 Busan	Cho Ho-sung (KOR)	Ma Yajun (CHN)	Noriyuki Iijima (JPN)
2006 Doha	Cheung King Wai (HKG)	Vladimir Tuychiev (UZB)	Ilya Chernyshov (KAZ)
2010 Guangzhou	Vladimir Tuychiev (UZB)	Wong Kam Po (HKG)	Mehdi Sohrabi (IRI)

=== 800 m mass start ===
Games	Gold	Silver	Bronze
1966 Bangkok	Preeda Chullamondhol (THA)	Kozo Nishimura (JPN)	Trevor de Silva (CEY)
1970 Bangkok	Kriengsak Varavudhi (THA)	Kim Kwang-sun (KOR)	Rolando Guaves (PHI)

=== 1600 m mass start ===
Games	Gold	Silver	Bronze
1966 Bangkok	Smaisuk Krisansuwan (THA)	Claudio Romeo (PHI)	Takao Shimomura (JPN)
1970 Bangkok	Daud Ibrahim (MAL)	Somchai Chantarasamrit (THA)	Roberto Querimit (PHI)

=== 4800 m mass start ===
Games	Gold	Silver	Bronze
1966 Bangkok	Preeda Chullamondhol (THA)	Liu Cheng-tao (ROC)	Trevor de Silva (CEY)
1970 Bangkok	Kriengsak Varavudhi (THA)	Rolando Guaves (PHI)	Kwon Jung-hyun (KOR)

=== 10000 m mass start ===
Games	Gold	Silver	Bronze
1966 Bangkok	Masanori Tsuji (JPN)	Chainarong Sophonpong (THA)	Claudio Romeo (PHI)
1970 Bangkok	Chainarong Sophonpong (THA)	Kwon Jung-hyun (KOR)	Ng Joo Pong (MAL)

=== Omnium ===
Games	Gold	Silver	Bronze
2014 Incheon	Eiya Hashimoto (JPN)	Cho Ho-sung (KOR)	Cheung King Lok (HKG)
2018 Jakarta–Palembang	Eiya Hashimoto (JPN)	Leung Chun Wing (HKG)	Artyom Zakharov (KAZ)
2022 Hangzhou	Kazushige Kuboki (JPN)	Leung Ka Yu (HKG)	Ahmed Al-Mansoori (UAE)

=== Tandem ===
Games	Gold	Silver	Bronze
1958 Tokyo	Japan (JPN); Kiyoshi Ochi; Takeo Kirigaya	Pakistan (PAK); Muhammad Shahrukh; Saleem Farooqi	None awarded

=== Madison ===
Games	Gold	Silver	Bronze
2002 Busan	South Korea (KOR); Suh Seok-kyu; Cho Ho-sung	Japan (JPN); Makoto Iijima; Shinichi Fukushima	Hong Kong (HKG); Wong Kam Po; Ho Siu Lun
2006 Doha	South Korea (KOR); Jang Sun-jae; Park Sung-baek	Kazakhstan (KAZ); Ilya Chernyshov; Alexey Lyalko	Iran (IRI); Mehdi Sohrabi; Amir Zargari
2018 Jakarta–Palembang	Hong Kong (HKG); Cheung King Lok; Leung Chun Wing	South Korea (KOR); Park Sang-hoon; Kim Ok-cheol	Japan (JPN); Eiya Hashimoto; Shunsuke Imamura
2022 Hangzhou	Japan (JPN); Naoki Kojima; Shunsuke Imamura	South Korea (KOR); Shin Dong-in; Kim Eu-ro	Kazakhstan (KAZ); Artyom Zakharov; Ramis Dinmukhametov

=== Team sprint ===
Games	Gold	Silver	Bronze
2002 Busan	Japan (JPN); Yuichiro Kamiyama; Harutomo Watanabe; Takashi Kaneko	South Korea (KOR); Yang Hee-jin; Cho Hyun-ok; Kim Chi-bum	Chinese Taipei (TPE); Lin Kun-hung; Chen Keng-hsien; Lin Chih-hsan
2006 Doha	Japan (JPN); Kazuya Narita; Yudai Nitta; Kazunari Watanabe	China (CHN); Feng Yong; Lin Feng; Zhang Lei	South Korea (KOR); Choi Lae-seon; Kang Dong-jin; Yang Hee-chun
2010 Guangzhou	China (CHN); Zhang Lei; Zhang Miao; Cheng Changsong	Japan (JPN); Kazunari Watanabe; Yudai Nitta; Kazuya Narita	Iran (IRI); Farshid Farsinejadian; Mahmoud Parash; Hassan Ali Varposhti
2014 Incheon	South Korea (KOR); Son Je-yong; Kang Dong-jin; Im Chae-bin	China (CHN); Hu Ke; Bao Saifei; Xu Chao	Japan (JPN); Tomoyuki Kawabata; Kazunari Watanabe; Seiichiro Nakagawa
2018 Jakarta–Palembang	China (CHN); Li Jianxin; Xu Chao; Zhou Yu	Malaysia (MAS); Azizulhasni Awang; Shah Firdaus Sahrom; Fadhil Zonis	Japan (JPN); Kazuki Amagai; Yudai Nitta; Tomohiro Fukaya
2022 Hangzhou	Japan (JPN); Yoshitaku Nagasako; Kaiya Ota; Yuta Obara; Shinji Nakano	China (CHN); Guo Shuai; Zhou Yu; Liu Qi; Xue Chenxi	Malaysia (MAS); Umar Hasbullah; Ridwan Sahrom; Fadhil Zonis

=== 1600 m team time trial ===
Games	Gold	Silver	Bronze
1966 Bangkok	Japan (JPN); Masayuki Goto; Morimasa Murakami; Junichi Onodera; Takao Shimomura	Thailand (THA); Somchai Chantarasamrit; Preeda Chullamondhol; Narong Nilpecharat; Somkuan Seehapant	South Korea (KOR); Kim Jung-kil; Kim Kwang-sun; Kwon Jung-hyun; Sin Dong-in
1970 Bangkok	Japan (JPN); Tsutomu Irimagawa; Seiichi Iwasaki; Takafumi Matsuda; Shinpei Okajima	Thailand (THA); Somchai Chantarasamrit; Suriya Saechia; Chainarong Sophonpong; Kriengsak Varavudhi	South Korea (KOR); Kim Jung-kil; Kim Kwang-sun; Kwon Jung-hyun; Suh Jung-sub

=== Team pursuit ===
Games	Gold	Silver	Bronze
1951 New Delhi	Japan (JPN); Ryo Ishikawa; Takeo Sato; Yuji Tachiiri; Kihei Tomioka	India (IND); Dhangar; Raj Kumar Mehra; Madan Mohan; Gurdev Singh	None awarded
1958 Tokyo	Japan (JPN); Mitsunori Arai; Katsuya Saito; Shigekazu Nakagawa; Masao Matsushima	Pakistan (PAK); Muhammad Shahrukh; Muhammad Ashiq; Abdul Razzaq Baloch; G. H. Baloch	Republic of China (ROC); Chen Shee-chuan; Huang Tan-chie; Lai Shuh-shong; Chen Po-chung
1966 Bangkok	Japan (JPN); Morimasa Murakami; Takao Ono; Junichi Onodera	Thailand (THA); Somchai Chantarasamrit; Pirom Choonlahoon; Preeda Chullamondhol; Smaisuk Krisansuwan	South Korea (KOR); Kim Jung-kil; Kim Kwang-sun; Kwon Jung-hyun; Suh Jung-sub
1970 Bangkok	Japan (JPN); Tsutomu Irimagawa; Seiichi Iwasaki; Takafumi Matsuda; Shinpei Okajima	Thailand (THA); Somchai Chantarasamrit; Suriya Saechia; Chainarong Sophonpong; Kriengsak Varavudhi	Iran (IRN); Hassan Arianfard; Hossein Baharloo; Manouchehr Daneshmand; Khosro Haghgosha
1974 Tehran	Japan (JPN)	Iran (IRN); Hossein Baharloo; Manouchehr Daneshmand; Khosro Haghgosha; Ali Pourmehr	South Korea (KOR); Kim Sang-soo; Lee Kwan-sun; Noh Hae-soo; Yang Joon-seng
1978 Bangkok	South Korea (KOR); Lee Jong-moon; Lee Kwan-sun; Park Il-woo; Shin Nam-soo	China (CHN); Huang Jun; Liu Fu; Ma Jianmin; Wu Shucheng	Japan (JPN); Kazuhiro Arai; Toshiaki Ikeura; Akira Kunisue; Hiroyashi Soeta
1982 New Delhi	Japan (JPN); Hisao Hozumi; Mitsugi Sarudate; Masashi Sato; Shigeru Yoshida	South Korea (KOR); Kim Ju-seok; Kim Mak-dong; Lee Yong-woo; Oh Yoon-hwan	Philippines (PHI); Deogracias Asuncion; Jomel Lorenzo; Renato Mier; Diomedes Panton
1986 Seoul	Japan (JPN); Koichi Azuma; Mitsuo Ishii; Hiroichi Kato; Yoshihiro Tsumuraya	South Korea (KOR); An Woo-hyok; Cho Keon-haeng; Do Eun-chul; Lee Ki-han	China (CHN); Jiang Xuehua; Lin Xufang; Liu Jun; Liu Xuezhong
1990 Beijing	Japan (JPN); Masamitsu Ehara; Keiji Kojima; Fumiharu Miyamoto; Yasuhiro Yoshida	China (CHN); Guo Longchen; Jin Shuda; Pan Guangchun; Wu Weipei	South Korea (KOR); Chung Jum-sik; Kim Yong-kyu; Lee Kyung-hwan; Park Min-soo
1994 Hiroshima	South Korea (KOR); Chung Young-hoon; Hong Suk-hwan; Ji Sung-hwan; Park Min-soo	Kazakhstan (KAZ); Sergey Konnov; Vadim Kravchenko; Sergey Lavrenenko; Alexandr Nadobenko	Japan (JPN); Naokiyo Hashisako; Makio Madarame; Susumu Oikawa; Eiko Takahashi
1998 Bangkok	South Korea (KOR); Hong Suk-hwan; Noh Young-sik; Ji Sung-hwan; Cho Ho-sung	Kazakhstan (KAZ); Vadim Kravchenko; Dmitriy Muravyev; Vladimir Bushanskiy; Valeriy Titov	China (CHN); Wang Zhengquan; Shi Guijun; Pan Guangchun; Ma Yajun
2002 Busan	China (CHN); Guo Jianbin; Ma Yajun; Shi Guijun; Wang Fei	Iran (IRI); Hossein Askari; Alireza Haghi; Abbas Saeidi Tanha; Amir Zargari	Kazakhstan (KAZ); Vladimir Bushanskiy; Andrey Kashechkin; Vadim Kravchenko; Dmitriy Muravyev
2006 Doha	South Korea (KOR); Hwang In-hyeok; Jang Sun-jae; Kim Dong-hun; Park Sung-baek	Iran (IRI); Hossein Nateghi; Abbas Saeidi Tanha; Mehdi Sohrabi; Amir Zargari	China (CHN); Chen Xiaoyong; Wang Youguo; Wen Hairui; Zeng Zhaoyu
2010 Guangzhou	South Korea (KOR); Cho Ho-sung; Hwang In-hyeok; Jang Sun-jae; Park Seon-ho	Hong Kong (HKG); Cheung King Lok; Cheung King Wai; Choi Ki Ho; Kwok Ho Ting	China (CHN); Jiang Xiao; Li Wei; Wang Mingwei; Wang Jie
2014 Incheon	China (CHN); Shi Tao; Yuan Zhong; Qin Chenlu; Liu Hao; Shen Pingan	South Korea (KOR); Im Jae-yeon; Park Sang-hoon; Park Seon-ho; Park Keon-woo; Jang Sun-jae	Japan (JPN); Shogo Ichimaru; Kazushige Kuboki; Eiya Hashimoto; Ryo Chikatani
2018 Jakarta–Palembang	China (CHN); Guo Liang; Qin Chenlu; Xue Chaohua; Shen Pingan	Hong Kong (HKG); Leung Chun Wing; Leung Ka Yu; Mow Ching Yin; Cheung King Lok; Ko Siu Wai	Japan (JPN); Shogo Ichimaru; Shunsuke Imamura; Ryo Chikatani; Eiya Hashimoto; Keitaro Sawada
2022 Hangzhou	Japan (JPN); Shoi Matsuda; Kazushige Kuboki; Eiya Hashimoto; Naoki Kojima; Shunsuke Imamura	China (CHN); Sun Haijiao; Yang Yang; Zhang Haiao; Sun Wentao	South Korea (KOR); Kim Hyeon-seok; Min Kyeong-ho; Jang Hun; Shin Dong-in

== Women's track ==
=== Sprint ===
Games	Gold	Silver	Bronze
1986 Seoul	Zhou Suying (CHN)	Zhou Shumin (CHN)	Jun Mi-sook (KOR)
1990 Beijing	Zhou Shumin (CHN)	Wang Xuemei (CHN)	Zhou Lingmei (CHN)
1994 Hiroshima	Chang Yubin (CHN)	Lu Jinhua (CHN)	Yang Hsiu-chen (TPE)
1998 Bangkok	Wang Yan (CHN)	Jiang Cuihua (CHN)	Fang Fen-fang (TPE)
2002 Busan	Li Na (CHN)	Maya Tachikawa (JPN)	Ku Hyun-jin (KOR)
2006 Doha	Guo Shuang (CHN)	Gong Jinjie (CHN)	You Jin-a (KOR)
2010 Guangzhou	Guo Shuang (CHN)	Lin Junhong (CHN)	Lee Wai Sze (HKG)
2014 Incheon	Lee Wai Sze (HKG)	Zhong Tianshi (CHN)	Lin Junhong (CHN)
2018 Jakarta–Palembang	Lee Wai Sze (HKG)	Lee Hye-jin (KOR)	Cho Sun-young (KOR)
2022 Hangzhou	Mina Sato (JPN)	Yuan Liying (CHN)	Riyu Ota (JPN)

=== 500 m time trial ===
- In 1990, 1 km time trial

Games	Gold	Silver	Bronze
1990 Beijing	Zhou Lingmei (CHN)	Zhao Yi (CHN)	Nurhayati (INA)
2002 Busan	Jiang Yonghua (CHN)	Sayuri Osuga (JPN)	Lee Jong-ae (KOR)
2006 Doha	Guo Shuang (CHN)	Hsiao Mei-yu (TPE)	You Jin-a (KOR)
2010 Guangzhou	Lee Wai Sze (HKG)	Guo Shuang (CHN)	Hsiao Mei-yu (TPE)

=== Keirin ===
Games	Gold	Silver	Bronze
2014 Incheon	Lee Wai Sze (HKG)	Fatehah Mustapa (MAS)	Zhong Tianshi (CHN)
2018 Jakarta–Palembang	Lee Wai Sze (HKG)	Lee Hye-jin (KOR)	Zhong Tianshi (CHN)
2022 Hangzhou	Mina Sato (JPN)	Wang Lijuan (CHN)	Zhang Linyin (CHN)

=== Individual pursuit ===
Games	Gold	Silver	Bronze
1990 Beijing	Zhao Yi (CHN)	Kim Jung-sin (KOR)	Wakako Abe (JPN)
1994 Hiroshima	Wang Qingzhi (CHN)	Ma Huizhen (CHN)	Seiko Hashimoto (JPN)
1998 Bangkok	Wang Qingzhi (CHN)	Zhao Haijuan (CHN)	Kim Yong-mi (KOR)
2002 Busan	Zhao Haijuan (CHN)	Uyun Muzizah (INA)	Lim Hyung-joon (KOR)
2006 Doha	Lee Min-hye (KOR)	Li Meifang (CHN)	Wang Li (CHN)
2010 Guangzhou	Jiang Fan (CHN)	Lee Min-hye (KOR)	Wu Chaomei (CHN)
2018 Jakarta–Palembang	Lee Ju-mi (KOR)	Wang Hong (CHN)	Huang Ting-ying (TPE)

=== Points race ===
Games	Gold	Silver	Bronze
2002 Busan	Kim Yong-mi (KOR)	Ayumu Otsuka (JPN)	Santia Tri Kusuma (INA)
2006 Doha	Li Yan (CHN)	Lee Min-hye (KOR)	Chanpeng Nontasin (THA)
2010 Guangzhou	Liu Xin (CHN)	Jamie Wong (HKG)	Chanpeng Nontasin (THA)

=== Omnium ===
Games	Gold	Silver	Bronze
2014 Incheon	Hsiao Mei-yu (TPE)	Luo Xiaoling (CHN)	Na Ah-reum (KOR)
2018 Jakarta–Palembang	Yumi Kajihara (JPN)	Huang Ting-ying (TPE)	Kim You-ri (KOR)
2022 Hangzhou	Yumi Kajihara (JPN)	Lee Sze Wing (HKG)	Liu Jiali (CHN)

=== Madison ===
Games	Gold	Silver	Bronze
2018 Jakarta–Palembang	South Korea (KOR); Kim You-ri; Na Ah-reum	Hong Kong (HKG); Yang Qianyu; Pang Yao	China (CHN); Liu Jiali; Wang Xiaofei
2022 Hangzhou	Japan (JPN); Tsuyaka Uchino; Maho Kakita	Hong Kong (HKG); Yang Qianyu; Lee Sze Wing	South Korea (KOR); Na Ah-reum; Lee Ju-mi

=== Team sprint ===
Games	Gold	Silver	Bronze
2014 Incheon	China (CHN); Gong Jinjie; Zhong Tianshi	South Korea (KOR); Kim Won-gyeong; Lee Hye-jin	Chinese Taipei (TPE); Hsiao Mei-yu; Huang Ting-ying
2018 Jakarta–Palembang	China (CHN); Lin Junhong; Zhong Tianshi	Hong Kong (HKG); Li Yin Yin; Ma Wing Yu; Lee Wai Sze	South Korea (KOR); Kim Won-gyeong; Lee Hye-jin; Cho Sun-young
2022 Hangzhou	China (CHN); Guo Yufang; Bao Shanju; Yuan Liying; Jiang Yulu	South Korea (KOR); Hwang Hyeon-seo; Kim Ha-eun; Cho Sun-young; Lee Hye-jin	Malaysia (MAS); Nurul Aliana Syafika Azizan; Nurul Izzah Izzati Asri; Anis Amira Rosidi

=== Team pursuit ===
Games	Gold	Silver	Bronze
2014 Incheon	China (CHN); Zhao Baofang; Huang Dongyan; Jiang Wenwen; Jing Yali	South Korea (KOR); Son Hee-jung; Kim You-ri; Lee Ju-mi; Na Ah-reum; Lee Min-hye; Rhee Chae-kyung	Chinese Taipei (TPE); Hsiao Mei-yu; Huang Ting-ying; Tseng Hsiao-chia; I Fang-ju
2018 Jakarta–Palembang	South Korea (KOR); Kim You-ri; Na Ah-reum; Kim Hyun-ji; Lee Ju-mi	China (CHN); Liu Jiali; Wang Xiaofei; Wang Hong; Chen Qiaolin; Ma Menglu; Jin Chenhong	Japan (JPN); Yuya Hashimoto; Miho Yoshikawa; Kisato Nakamura; Yumi Kajihara; Nao Suzuki
2022 Hangzhou	Japan (JPN); Yumi Kajihara; Mizuki Ikeda; Tsuyaka Uchino; Maho Kakita	China (CHN); Wang Susu; Wei Suwan; Wang Xiaoyue; Zhang Hongjie	Hong Kong (HKG); Lee Sze Wing; Yang Qianyu; Leung Bo Yee; Leung Wing Yee
