= Cycling at the 1990 Asian Games =

- Venue: Huairou–Miyun and Changping Xiezishi Highway; Changping Velodrome
- Dates: 24 September – 1 October 1990

Cycling was contested at the 1990 Asian Games in Changping Velodrome, Beijing, China from September 24 to October 1.

== Medalists ==
=== Road ===
==== Men ====
Event	Gold	Silver	Bronze
Road race	Tang Xuezhong; China	Wang Shusen; China	Dashnyamyn Tömör-Ochir; Mongolia
Team time trial	China; Guo Longchen; Liu Hong; Tang Xuezhong; Wu Weipei	Mongolia; Damdinjamtsyn Jargalsaikhan; Batsükhiin Khayankhyarvaa; Dashjamtsyn Mönkhbat; Dashnyamyn Tömör-Ochir	South Korea; Cho Duk-haeng; Chung Rai-jin; Kwon Jung-ho; Park Myung-soon

==== Women ====
Event	Gold	Silver	Bronze
Road race	Lu Suyan; China	Zhang Shuzhen; China	Kyung Mi-ok; South Korea

=== Track ===
==== Men ====
Event	Gold	Silver	Bronze
Sprint	Hideki Miwa; Japan	Hiroshi Toyooka; Japan	Toshinobu Saito; Japan
1 km time trial	Keiji Kojima; Japan	Hiroshi Toyooka; Japan	Um Young-sup; South Korea
Individual pursuit	Park Min-soo; South Korea	Masamitsu Ehara; Japan	Chou Tsung-te; Chinese Taipei
Points race	Park Min-soo; South Korea	Hsu Jui-te; Chinese Taipei	Daisuke Imanaka; Japan
Team pursuit	Japan; Masamitsu Ehara; Keiji Kojima; Fumiharu Miyamoto; Yasuhiro Yoshida	China; Guo Longchen; Jin Shuda; Pan Guangchun; Wu Weipei	South Korea; Chung Jum-sik; Kim Yong-kyu; Lee Kyung-hwan; Park Min-soo

==== Women ====
Event	Gold	Silver	Bronze
Sprint	Zhou Shumin; China	Wang Xuemei; China	Zhou Lingmei; China
1 km time trial	Zhou Lingmei; China	Zhao Yi; China	Nurhayati; Indonesia
Individual pursuit	Zhao Yi; China	Kim Jung-sin; South Korea	Wakako Abe; Japan

== Medal table ==
Rank	Nation	Gold	Silver	Bronze	Total
1	China (CHN)	6	5	1	12
2	Japan (JPN)	3	3	3	9
3	South Korea (KOR)	2	1	4	7
4	Chinese Taipei (TPE)	0	1	1	2
4	Mongolia (MGL)	0	1	1	2
6	Indonesia (INA)	0	0	1	1
Totals (6 entries)		11	11	11	33
