= Asian Games sports =

This is a list of sports played in the Asian Games and other major affiliated games organized by the Olympic Council of Asia. On 29 June 2009, the OCA announced major changes to the event lists in the five major events, in particular aiming to restrict each sport to be played in not more than one event, although exemptions may be made. The first round of changes commenced with the 2014 Asian Games when the number of events was recommended to be restricted to 35 with 28 Olympic sports and up to a maximum of seven non-Olympic sports. Some events currently in the Asian Games programme may henceforth be relegated to the newly formed Asian Indoor-Martial Arts Games which was first held in 2013 or to the Asian Beach Games.

== Asian Games ==
The figures in each cell indicate the number of events for each sport contested at the respective Games; a bullet (•) denotes that the sport was contested as a demonstration sport.

Sport (Discipline)		Body World (Asia)	51	54	58	62	66	70	74	78	82	86	90	94	98	02	06	10	14	18	22	26
Aquatics	Artistic swimming	AQUA (AA)												2	2	2	2	3	3	2	2	2
Aquatics	Diving	AQUA (AA)	2	4	4	4	4	4	4	4	4	4	8	4	4	8	10	10	10	10	10	10
Aquatics	Open water swimming	AQUA (AA)																			2	
Aquatics	Swimming	AQUA (AA)	8	13	21	21	23	24	25	29	29	29	31	31	32	32	38	38	38	41	41	41
Aquatics	Water polo	AQUA (AA)	1	1	1	1	1	1	1	1	1	1	1	1	1	1	1	2	2	2	2	2
Archery		WA (WAA)								4	4	12	4	4	4	4	4	4	8	8	10	10
Athletics		WA (AA)	33	30	31	32	34	35	35	39	40	42	43	43	45	45	45	47	47	48	48	50
Badminton		BWF (BA)				6	7	7	7	7	7	7	7	7	7	7	7	7	7	7	7	7
Baseball / Softball	Baseball	WBSC (BFA/SA)											•	1	1	1	1	1	1	1	1	1
Baseball / Softball	Softball	WBSC (BFA/SA)											1	1	1	1	1	1	1	1	1	1
Basketball	3x3	FIBA (FIBA Asia)																		2	2	2
Basketball	Basketball	FIBA (FIBA Asia)	1	1	1	1	1	1	2	2	2	2	2	2	2	2	2	2	2	2	2	2
Bodybuilding		IFBB (AFBF)														8	8					
Bowling		IBF (ABF)								10		12		12	10	10	12	12	12	6		
Boxing		WB (AB)		7	10	10	11	11	11	11	12	12	12	12	12	12	11	13	13	10	13	11
Bridge		WBF (APBF)																		6	3	
Canoeing	Canoe polo	PWW (ACC)																		•		
Canoeing	Slalom	PWW (ACC)																4	4	4	4	6
Canoeing	Sprint	PWW (ACC)											13	13	12	13	10	12	12	12	12	12
Chess		FIDE (ACF)															3	4			4	
Cricket		ICC (ACC)																2	2		2	2
Cue sports		WCBS (ACBS)													10	10	10	10				
Cycling	BMX freestyle	UCI (ACC)																				2
Cycling	BMX racing	UCI (ACC)																2	2	2	2	2
Cycling	Mountain bike	UCI (ACC)													4	4		2	2	4	2	2
Cycling	Road	UCI (ACC)	1		2	4	3	3	2	2	2	3	3	3	4	4	5	4	4	4	4	4
Cycling	Track	UCI (ACC)	3		4		8	8	4	4	5	6	8	7	7	12	12	10	10	14	12	12
Dancesport	Ballroom	WDSF (DSA)													•			10				
Dancesport	Breaking	WDSF (DSA)																			2	2
Dragon boat		IDBF (ADBF)																6		5	6	
Equestrian		FEI (AEF)									4	6		4	6	6	8	6	6	6	6	7
Esports		(AESF)																		•	7	11
Fencing		FIE (FCA)							8	8		8	10	8	10	12	12	12	12	12	12	12
Field hockey		FIH (AHF)			1	1	1	1	1	1	2	2	2	2	2	2	2	2	2	2	2	2
Football		FIFA (AFC)	1	1	1	1	1	1	1	1	1	1	2	2	2	2	2	2	2	2	2	2
Go		IGF (AGF)																3			3	
Golf		IGF (APGC)									2	2	4	4	4	4	4	4	4	4	4	4
Gymnastics	Artistic	WG (AGU)							14	14	14	14	14	14	14	14	14	14	14	14	14	14
Gymnastics	Rhythmic	WG (AGU)												1	2	2	2	2	2	2	2	2
Gymnastics	Trampoline	WG (AGU)															2	2	2	2	2	2
Handball		IHF (AHF)									1	1	2	2	2	2	2	2	2	2	2	2
Jet ski		UIM																		4		
Judo		IJF (JUA)										8	16	16	14	16	16	16	16	15	15	15
Ju-jitsu		JJIF (JJAU)																		8	8	8
Kabaddi		IKF (AKF)											1	1	1	1	1	2	2	2	2	2
Karate		WKF (AKF)												11	11	11	13	13	13	12	14	15
Kurash		IKA (KCAO)																		7	7	6
Mixed martial arts		(AMMA)																				6
Modern pentathlon		UIPM (AMPC)												2		6		4	4	2	4	4
Muaythai		IFMA (FAMA)													•							
Padel		FIP (Padel Asia)																				2
Paragliding		FAI (AFA)																		6		
Pencak silat		IPSF (APSIF)																		16		
Roller sports	Artistic	WSK (WSA)																3			1	
Roller sports	Inline freestyle	WSK (WSA)																			3	
Roller sports	Skateboarding	WSK (WSA)																		4	4	4
Roller sports	Speed	WSK (WSA)																6		2	6	
Rowing		WR (ARF)									4	8	14	12	11	13	10	14	14	15	14	14
Rugby	Sevens	WR (AR)													1	1	1	2	2	2	2	2
Rugby	Union	WR (AR)													1	1						
Sailing		WS (ASAF)						5		4	4	5	7	7	16	15	14	14	14	10	14	14
Sambo		FIAS (SUAO)																		4		
Sepak takraw		ISTAF (ASTAF)											2	1	6	6	6	6	6	6	6	6
Shooting		ISSF (ASC)		6	6	5	14	14	22	22	22	30	40	34	34	42	44	44	44	20	33	28
Soft tennis		ISTF (ASTF)											•	4	4	7	7	7	7	5	5	5
Sport climbing		WC (WC Asia)																		6	6	6
Squash		WSF (ASF)													2	2	2	4	4	4	5	5
Surfing		ISA (ASF)																				2
Table tennis		ITTF (ATTU)			7	7	7		7	7	7	7	7	7	7	7	7	7	7	5	7	7
Taekwondo		WT (ATU)										8		8	16	16	16	16	16	14	13	11
Tennis		World Tennis (ATF)			5	7	7		7	7	7	7	7	7	7	7	7	7	7	5	5	5
Teqball		FITEQ																				5
Triathlon		TRI (AST)															2	2	3	3	3	3
Volleyball	Beach	FIVB (AVC)													2	2	2	2	2	2	2	2
Volleyball	Indoor	FIVB (AVC)			2	4	2	2	2	2	2	2	2	2	2	2	2	2	2	2	2	2
Weightlifting		IWF (AWF)	7	7	8		8	8	27	10	10	10	19	19	15	15	15	15	15	15	14	16
Wrestling		UWW (UWWA)		7	8	16	8	10	20	10	10	20	20	20	16	18	18	18	20	18	18	18
Wushu		IWUF (WFA)											6	6	11	11	11	15	15	14	15	15
Xiangqi		WXF (AXF)																2			3	
Total events			57	77	112	120	140	135	200	199	196	269	308	337	377	419	424	476	439	465	481	469

== Asian Winter Games ==
The figures in each cell indicate the number of events for each sport contested at the respective Games; a bullet (•) denotes that the sport was contested as a demonstration sport.

Sport (Discipline)		Body World (Asia)	86	90	96	99	03	07	11	17	25
Bandy		FIB							1		
Biathlon		IBU	3	3	6	6	6	7	7	7	4
Curling		WC					2	2		2	3
Ice hockey		IIHF	1	1	2	2	2	2	2	2	2
Skating	Figure	ISU (ASU)	4		4	4	4	4	4	4	4
Skating	Short-track speed	ISU (ASU)	8	10	10	10	10	8	8	8	9
Skating	Speed	ISU (ASU)	9	9	9	9	9	10	12	14	14
Ski mountaineering		ISMF (ASMF)									3
Ski orienteering		IOF							8		
Skiing	Alpine	FIS (ASF)	4	4	4	6	4	4	6	4	2
Skiing	Cross-country	FIS (ASF)	6	6	6	6	7	6	12	10	6
Skiing	Freestyle	FIS (ASF)			2		2	2	6	4	11
Skiing	Ski jumping	FIS (ASF)	•	•	•		2		3	3	
Skiing	Snowboarding	FIS (ASF)					3 •	2		6	6
Total events			35	33	43	43	51	47	69	64	64

== Asian Indoor and Martial Arts Games ==
The figures in each cell indicate the number of events for each sport contested at the respective Games; a bullet (•) denotes that the sport was contested as a demonstration sport.

Sport (Discipline)		Body World (Asia)	05	07	09 (M)	09	13	17	26
3x3 basketball		FIBA (FIBA Asia)		•		2		2	2
Aerobic gymnastics		WG (AGU)	4	4		4			
Bowling		IBF (ABF)		6		6	6	6	
Boxing		WB (AB)				8			10
Chess		FIDE (ACF)		9		4	4	10	4
Cue sports		WCBS (ACBS)		8		10	10	13	7
Cycling	BMX freestyle	UCI (ACC)	3	5					
Cycling	Indoor	UCI (ACC)	5	5					
Cycling	Track	UCI (ACC)						9	
Dancesport		WDSF (DSA)	12	12		10	10	11	
Dragon & lion dance		IDLDF (DLDFA)		6		6			
Equestrian		FEI (AEF)						3	
Esports		(AESF)		3		6	6	•	
Finswimming		CMAS		8		16			
Futsal		FIFA (AFC)	2	2		2	2	2	2
Go		IGF (AGF)					4		
Handball		IHF (AHF)							2
Indoor archery		WA (WAA)				8			
Indoor athletics		WA (AA)	26	26		26		25	
Indoor hockey		FIH (AHF)		1					
Judo		IJF (JUA)			14				8
Ju-jitsu		JJIF (JJAU)			7	•		25	10
Kabaddi	Indoor	IKF (AKF)				1	2		
Kabaddi	Standard	IKF (AKF)		1					2
Karate		WKF (AKF)			10				13
Kickboxing		WAKO (WAKO Asia)		•	10	8	9	15	
Kurash		IKA (KCAO)		•	14	8	8	15	
Mixed martial arts		(AMMA)							10
Muaythai		IFMA (FAMA)	17	9	15	9	9	14	8
Padel		FIP							2
Pencak silat		IPSF (APSIF)			11	15			
Pétanque		FIPJP (ABSC)				4			
Roller sports	Roller freestyle	WSK (WSA)	3	4					
Roller sports	Skateboarding	WSK (WSA)	2	2					
Sambo		FIAS (SUAO)						23	
Sepak takraw		ISTAF (ASTAF)	2	2		2			
Short course swimming		AQUA (AA)	40	30		30	30	30	
Shuttlecock		ISF				6			
Sport climbing		WC (WC Asia)	4	4					
Squash		WSF (ASF)							2
Taekwondo		WT (ATU)			16			18	15
Tennis		ITF (ATF)						5	
Teqball		FITEQ							3
Vovinam		WVVF (AVF)				14			
Weightlifting		IWF (AWF)						16	8
Wrestling	Alysh	UWW (UWWA)						24	
Wrestling	Belt	UWW (UWWA)				•		28	
Wrestling	Kazakh kuresi	UWW (UWWA)						3	
Wrestling	Pahlavani	UWW (UWWA)						3	
Wrestling	Turkmen goresh	UWW (UWWA)						26	
Wrestling	Wrestling	UWW (UWWA)						22	14
Wushu		IWUF (WFA)			11	8			
Xiangqi		WXF (AXF)		4		2			
Total events			120	151	108	215	100	348	122

== Asian Beach Games ==
The figures in each cell indicate the number of events for each sport contested at the respective Games; a bullet (•) denotes that the sport was contested as a demonstration sport.

Sport (Discipline)		Body World (Asia)	08	10	12	14	16	26
3x3 basketball		FIBA (FIBA Asia)	2		2	2	2	2
Air sports	Paragliding	FAI (AFA)	8			4		
Air sports	Paramotoring	FAI (AFA)			4	4		
Aquatics	4x4 water polo	AQUA (AA)	1	1		1	1	2
Aquatics	Open water swimming	AQUA (AA)	4	4		4	4	3
Beach athletics		WA (AA)				12	14	10
Beach flag football		IFAF (IFAF Asia)				1		
Beach handball		IHF (AHF)	2	2	2	2	2	2
Beach kabaddi		IKF (AKF)	2	2	2	2	2	2
Beach kurash		IKA (KCAO)				8	10	
Beach sambo		FIAS (SUAO)				7	8	
Beach sepak takraw		ISTAF (ASTAF)	4	4	4	6	6	
Beach soccer		FIFA (AFC)	1	1	1	1	1	1
Beach volleyball		FIVB (AVC)	2	2	2	2	2	2
Beach woodball		IWbF (AWbF)	4	4	4	8	11	
Beach wrestling		UWW (UWWA)	4			6	8	8
BMX freestyle		UCI (ACC)				4		
Bodybuilding		IFBB (AFBF)	6	6		5	7	
Coastal rowing		WR (ARF)					6	
Dragon boat		IDBF (ADBF)	6			6		6
Footvolley		(AFF)				1		
Jet ski		UIM	4	4		6		
Ju-jitsu		JJIF (JJAU)				12	18	6
Muaythai		IFMA (FAMA)				15	16	
Pencak silat		IPSF (APSIF)	8				18	
Pétanque		FIPJP (ABSC)				9	9	
Roller sports	Roller freestyle	WSK (WSA)				3		
Roller sports	Skateboarding	WSK (WSA)				3		
Roller sports	Speed	WSK (WSA)			8			
Sailing		WS (ASAF)	6	6	2	9		8
Shuttlecock		ISF					7	
Sport climbing		WC (WC Asia)			8	4		4
Squash		WSF (ASF)				2		
Surfing		ISA (ASF)	5					
Tent pegging		ITPF (AEF)		8				
Teqball		FITEQ						3
Triathle		UIPM (AMPC)				3		
Triathlon	Aquathlon	TRI (AST)						3
Triathlon	Duathlon	TRI (AST)				3		
Triathlon	Triathlon	TRI (AST)	2	2		3		
Vocotruyen		WFVV					11	
Vovinam		WVVF (AVF)					9	
Water skiing		IWWF (AWWF)		6	4	13		
Total events			71	52	49	165	172	62

== Asian Youth Games ==
The figures in each cell indicate the number of events for each sport contested at the respective Games; a bullet (•) denotes that the sport was contested as a demonstration sport.

Sport (Discipline)		Body World (Asia)	09	13	25
3x3 basketball		FIBA (FIBA Asia)	2	2	2
Aquatics	Diving	AQUA (AA)	4	4	
Aquatics	Swimming	AQUA (AA)	32	30	34
Athletics		WA (AA)	28	34	37
Badminton		BWF (BA)		3	3
Bowling		IBF (ABF)	8		
Boxing		WB (AB)			14
Camel racing		WCS			2
Cycling		UCI (ACC)			5
Equestrian		FEI (AEF)			4
Esports		(AESF)			4
Fencing		FIE (FCA)		6	
Football	Football	FIFA (AFC)	1	1	
Football	Futsal	FIFA (AFC)			2
Golf		IGF (APGC)		2	4
Handball		IHF (AHF)		2	2
Judo		IJF (JUA)		6	16
Ju-jitsu		JJIF (JJAU)			9
Kabaddi		IKF (AKF)			2
Kurash		IKA (KCAO)			4
Mixed martial arts		(AMMA)			15
Muaythai		IFMA (FAMA)			17
Pencak silat		IPSF (APSIF)			3
Rugby sevens		WR (AR)		2	
Sailing		WS (ASAF)	5		
Shooting		ISSF (ASC)	4	8	
Squash		WSF (ASF)		4	
Table tennis		ITTF (ATTU)	4	2	3
Taekwondo		WT (ATU)		4	17
Tennis		ITF (ATF)		3	
Teqball		FITEQ			5
Triathlon		TRI (AST)			3
Volleyball	Beach	FIVB (AVC)	2		2
Volleyball	Indoor	FIVB (AVC)			2
Weightlifting		IWF (AWF)		9	32
Wrestling	Beach	UWW (UWWA)			5
Wrestling	Wrestling	UWW (UWWA)			16
Total events			90	122	264

== See also ==
- Commonwealth Games sports
- Olympic sports
- World Games sports
