= Cycling at the 1986 Asian Games =

- Venue: Olympic Velodrome
- Dates: 21–28 September 1986

Cycling was contested at the 1986 Asian Games in Olympic Velodrome, Seoul, South Korea from September 21 to September 28.

== Medalists ==
=== Road ===
==== Men ====
Event	Gold	Silver	Bronze
Road race	Shin Dae-chul; South Korea	Fanny Gunawan; Indonesia	Oh Yoon-hwan; South Korea
Team time trial	China; Guo Longchen; Han Shuxiang; Wu Weipei; Zhang Zhonglu	Japan; Toshimi Sato; Kyoshi Miura; Matsuyoshi Takahashi; Hiroshi Daimon	South Korea; Kim Chul-seok; Jang Yun-ho; Kim Kwang-pil; Lee Jin-ok

==== Women ====
Event	Gold	Silver	Bronze
Road race	Kim Kyung-sook; South Korea	Wang Li; China	Son Yak-sun; South Korea

=== Track ===
==== Men ====
Event	Gold	Silver	Bronze
Sprint	Norichika Shirai; Japan	Hiroshi Toyooka; Japan	Um Young-sup; South Korea
1 km time trial	Mitsuo Ishii; Japan	Um Young-sup; South Korea	Wang Jifu; China
Individual pursuit	Yoshihiro Tsumuraya; Japan	Koichi Azuma; Japan	Mehrdad Afsharian; Iran
Points race	Ali Zangiabadi; Iran	Yuichiro Kamiyama; Japan	Bernardo Rimarim; Philippines
Team pursuit	Japan; Koichi Azuma; Mitsuo Ishii; Hiroichi Kato; Yoshihiro Tsumuraya	South Korea; An Woo-hyok; Cho Keon-haeng; Do Eun-chul; Lee Ki-han	China; Jiang Xuehua; Lin Xufang; Liu Jun; Liu Xuezhong

==== Women ====
Event	Gold	Silver	Bronze
Sprint	Zhou Suying; China	Zhou Shumin; China	Jun Mi-sook; South Korea

== Medal table ==
Rank	Nation	Gold	Silver	Bronze	Total
1	Japan (JPN)	4	4	0	8
2	South Korea (KOR)	2	2	5	9
3	China (CHN)	2	2	2	6
4	Iran (IRN)	1	0	1	2
5	Indonesia (INA)	0	1	0	1
6	Philippines (PHI)	0	0	1	1
Totals (6 entries)		9	9	9	27
