= Cycling at the 1970 Asian Games =

- Venue: Huamark Velodrome
- Dates: 10–19 December 1970

Cycling at the 1970 Asian Games was held in Bangkok, Thailand from 10 to 19 September 1970.

== Medalists ==
=== Road ===
Event	Gold	Silver	Bronze
Road race	Ng Joo Ngan; Malaysia	Masato Abe; Japan	Jung Chong-jin; South Korea
Team road race	South Korea; Cho Sung-hwan; Hwang Bo-youn; Jung Chong-jin; Yoo Jae-myung	Malaysia; Chow Teck Beng; Ng Joo Ngan; Azizan Ramli; Omar Haji Saad	Japan; Masato Abe; Toru Miyaichi; Takao Ono; Terue Yoshida
Team time trial	Japan; Masato Abe; Toru Miyaichi; Takao Ono; Terue Yoshida	Iran; Hassan Arianfard; Hossein Baharloo; Asghar Darroudi; Khosro Haghgosha	South Korea; Cho Sung-hwan; Chun Sung-kook; Jung Chong-jin; Yoo Jae-myung

=== Track ===
Event	Gold	Silver	Bronze
1 km time trial	Takafumi Matsuda; Japan	Kim Kwang-sun; South Korea	Daud Ibrahim; Malaysia
Individual pursuit	Kenichi Ono; Japan	Kwon Jung-hyun; South Korea	Suriya Saechia; Thailand
800 m mass start	Kriengsak Varavudhi; Thailand	Kim Kwang-sun; South Korea	Rolando Guaves; Philippines
1600 m mass start	Daud Ibrahim; Malaysia	Somchai Chantarasamrit; Thailand	Roberto Querimit; Philippines
4800 m mass start	Kriengsak Varavudhi; Thailand	Rolando Guaves; Philippines	Kwon Jung-hyun; South Korea
10000 m mass start	Chainarong Sophonpong; Thailand	Kwon Jung-hyun; South Korea	Ng Joo Pong; Malaysia
1600 m team time trial	Japan; Tsutomu Irimagawa; Seiichi Iwasaki; Takafumi Matsuda; Shinpei Okajima	Thailand; Somchai Chantarasamrit; Suriya Saechia; Chainarong Sophonpong; Kriengsak Varavudhi	South Korea; Kim Jung-kil; Kim Kwang-sun; Kwon Jung-hyun; Suh Jung-sub
Team pursuit	Japan; Tsutomu Irimagawa; Seiichi Iwasaki; Takafumi Matsuda; Shinpei Okajima	Thailand; Somchai Chantarasamrit; Suriya Saechia; Chainarong Sophonpong; Kriengsak Varavudhi	Iran; Hassan Arianfard; Hossein Baharloo; Manouchehr Daneshmand; Khosro Haghgosha

== Medal table ==
Rank	Nation	Gold	Silver	Bronze	Total
1	Japan (JPN)	5	1	1	7
2	Thailand (THA)	3	3	1	7
3	Malaysia (MAL)	2	1	2	5
4	South Korea (KOR)	1	4	4	9
5	Philippines (PHI)	0	1	2	3
6	Iran (IRN)	0	1	1	2
Totals (6 entries)		11	11	11	33
