= Cycling at the 1994 Asian Games =

- Venue: Hiroshima Velodrome
- Dates: 9–15 October 1994

Cycling was contested at the 1994 Asian Games in Hiroshima, Japan from October 9 to October 15.

== Medalists ==
=== Road ===
==== Men ====
Event	Gold	Silver	Bronze
Road race	Andrey Kivilev; Kazakhstan	Alexander Vinokourov; Kazakhstan	Tang Xuezhong; China
Team time trial	Kazakhstan; Sergey Lavrenenko; Andrey Mizurov; Mikhail Teteryuk; Alexander Vinokourov	China; Pan Guangchun; Tang Xuezhong; Wang Zhengquan; Zhu Zhengjun	Kyrgyzstan; Dmitriy Chentsov; Aleksandr Dyadichkin; Aleksandr Kaikin; Evgeny Tuzkov

==== Women ====
Event	Gold	Silver	Bronze
Road race	Guo Xinghong; China	Zhao Haijuan; China	Wang Shuqing; China

=== Track ===
==== Men ====
Event	Gold	Silver	Bronze
Sprint	Toshinobu Saito; Japan	Hyun Byung-chul; South Korea	Toshiyuki Ono; Japan
1 km time trial	Masanaga Shiohara; Japan	Hong Suk-hwan; South Korea	Won Chang-yong; South Korea
Individual pursuit	Vadim Kravchenko; Kazakhstan	Eugen Wacker; Kyrgyzstan	Guo Longchen; China
Points race	Cho Ho-sung; South Korea	Vadim Kravchenko; Kazakhstan	Akihiro Osawa; Japan
Team pursuit	South Korea; Chung Young-hoon; Hong Suk-hwan; Ji Sung-hwan; Park Min-soo	Kazakhstan; Sergey Konnov; Vadim Kravchenko; Sergey Lavrenenko; Alexandr Nadobenko	Japan; Naokiyo Hashisako; Makio Madarame; Susumu Oikawa; Eiko Takahashi

==== Women ====
Event	Gold	Silver	Bronze
Sprint	Chang Yubin; China	Lu Jinhua; China	Yang Hsiu-chen; Chinese Taipei
Individual pursuit	Wang Qingzhi; China	Ma Huizhen; China	Seiko Hashimoto; Japan

== Medal table ==
Rank	Nation	Gold	Silver	Bronze	Total
1	China (CHN)	3	4	3	10
2	Kazakhstan (KAZ)	3	3	0	6
3	South Korea (KOR)	2	2	1	5
4	Japan (JPN)	2	0	4	6
5	Kyrgyzstan (KGZ)	0	1	1	2
6	Chinese Taipei (TPE)	0	0	1	1
Totals (6 entries)		10	10	10	30
