= Cycling at the 1982 Asian Games =

- Venue: Yamuna Velodrome
- Dates: 21–28 November 1982

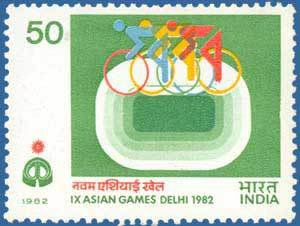

Cycling was contested at the 1982 Asian Games in New Delhi, India.

== Medalists ==
=== Road ===
Event	Gold	Silver	Bronze
Road race	Park Se-ryong; South Korea	Tsedendambyn Ganbold; Mongolia	Ali Zangiabadi; Iran
Team time trial	South Korea; Jang Yun-ho; Kim Byung-sun; Kim Chul-seok; Lee Jin-ok	Japan; Masatoshi Ichikawa; Hiroki Sekine; Matsuyoshi Takahashi; Masatomo Yabe	Iran; Mehrdad Afsharian; Abolfazl Khandaghi; Mohammad Ali Mohammadi; Ali Zangiabadi

=== Track ===
Event	Gold	Silver	Bronze
Sprint	Tsutomu Sakamoto; Japan	Katsuo Nakatake; Japan	Kim Young-soo; South Korea
1 km time trial	Tsutomu Sakamoto; Japan	Kim Young-soo; South Korea	Rodolfo Guaves; Philippines
Individual pursuit	Mitsugi Sarudate; Japan	Kim Ju-seok; South Korea	Liu Xuezhong; China
Points race	Akira Bando; Japan	Matsuyoshi Takahashi; Japan	Edgardo Pagarigan; Philippines
Team pursuit	Japan; Hisao Hozumi; Mitsugi Sarudate; Masashi Sato; Shigeru Yoshida	South Korea; Kim Ju-seok; Kim Mak-dong; Lee Yong-woo; Oh Yoon-hwan	Philippines; Deogracias Asuncion; Jomel Lorenzo; Renato Mier; Diomedes Panton

== Medal table ==
Rank	Nation	Gold	Silver	Bronze	Total
1	Japan (JPN)	5	3	0	8
2	South Korea (KOR)	2	3	1	6
3	Mongolia (MGL)	0	1	0	1
4	Philippines (PHI)	0	0	3	3
5	Iran (IRN)	0	0	2	2
6	China (CHN)	0	0	1	1
Totals (6 entries)		7	7	7	21
