= Badminton at the 1970 Asian Games – Women's team =

Women's team at the 1970 Asian Games
- Venue: Kittikachorn Stadium, Thailand
- Dates: 11 – 14 December 1970

Medalists
gold medal	Japan; Machiko Aizawa, Mariko Nishio, Etsuko Takenaka, Hiroe Yuki
silver medal	Thailand; Sumol Chanklum, Boopha Kaenthong, Thongkam Kingmanee, Petchroong Liengtrakulngam, Pachara Pattabongse
bronze medal	South Korea; Han Sook-ee, Yoon Im-soon, Kang Young-sin, Kim Jong-ja
bronze medal	Indonesia; Utami Dewi, Retno Koestijah, Minarni, Nurhaena, Poppy Tumengkol, Theresia Widiastuti

The badminton women's team tournament at the 1970 Asian Games took place from 11 to 14 December at the Kittikachorn Stadium in Bangkok, Thailand.

== Schedule ==
All times are Indochina Time (UTC+07:00)

Date	Time	Event
Friday, 11 December 1970	14:00	Quarter-finals
Saturday, 12 December 1970	14:00	Semi-finals
Monday, 14 December 1970	14:00	Gold medal match

== Bracket ==
Quarter-finals
Republic of China	2
South Korea	3
Indonesia	3
Malaysia	2

Semi-finals
Thailand	3
South Korea	0
Indonesia	2
Japan	3

Gold medal match
Thailand	1
Japan	3

== Quarter-finals ==
=== South Korea vs Republic of China (Taiwan) ===
South Korea
3
Kittikachorn Stadium
11 December 1970, 14:00

Republic оf China
2

			1	2	3
1	(South Korea) (Taiwan)	Yoon Im-soon; Sun Ying	11; 2	11; 6
2	(South Korea) (Taiwan)	Kang Young-sin; Yu Yu-e	11; 6	3; 11	5; 11
3	(South Korea) (Taiwan)	Kang Young-sin / Yoon Im-soon; Li Chien-ping / Sun Ying	15; 5	15; 7
4	(South Korea) (Taiwan)	Kim Jong-ja / Han Sook-ee; Lee Yu-mei / Yu Yu-e	6; 15	11; 15
5	(South Korea) (Taiwan)	Han Sook-ee; Lee Yu-mei	11; 8	11; 5

=== Indonesia vs Malaysia ===
Indonesia
3
Kittikachorn Stadium
11 December 1970, 14:00

Malaysia
2

			1	2	3
1	(Indonesia) (Malaysia)	Minarni; Rosalind Singha Ang	11; 4	11; 1
2	(Indonesia) (Malaysia)	Utami Dewi; Sylvia Ng	0; 11	5; 11
3	(Indonesia) (Malaysia)	Retno Koestijah / Minarni; Sylvia Ng / Sylvia Tan	15; 5	15; 1
4	(Indonesia) (Malaysia)	Nurhaena / Poppy Tumengkol; Rosalind Singha Ang / Teoh Siew Yong	2; 15	3; 15
5	(Indonesia) (Malaysia)	Retno Koestijah; Sylvia Tan	12; 10	11; 6

== Semi-finals ==
=== Thailand vs South Korea ===
Thailand
3
Kittikachorn Stadium
12 December 1970, 14:00

South Korea
0

			1	2	3
1	(Thailand) (South Korea)	Thongkam Kingmanee; Kim Jong-ja	11; 2	11; 6
2	(Thailand) (South Korea)	Sumol Chanklum; Kang Young-sin	11; 2	11; 0
3	(Thailand) (South Korea)	Boopha Kaenthong / Thongkam Kingmanee; Kang Young-sin / Yoon Im-soon	15; 6	10; 15	15; 6
4	(Thailand) (South Korea)	Sumol Chanklum / Pachara Pattabongse; Kim Jong-ja / Han Sook-ee				not played
5	(Thailand) (South Korea)	Petchroong Liengtrakulngam; Han Sook-ee				not played

=== Indonesia vs Japan ===
Indonesia
2
Kittikachorn Stadium
12 December 1970, 14:00

Japan
3

			1	2	3
1	(Indonesia) (Japan)	Hiroe Yuki; Minarni	12; 11	11; 4
2	(Indonesia) (Japan)	Etsuko Takenaka; Utami Dewi	1; 11	7; 11
3	(Indonesia) (Japan)	Machiko Aizawa / Etsuko Takenaka; Retno Koestijah / Minarni	15; 8	8; 15	16; 17
4	(Indonesia) (Japan)	Mariko Nishio / Hiroe Yuki; Nurhaena / Poppy Tumengkol	15; 9	15; 13
5	(Indonesia) (Japan)	Machiko Aizawa; Retno Koestijah	8; 11	11; 6	12; 10

== Gold medal match ==
=== Japan vs Thailand ===
Japan
3
Kittikachorn Stadium
14 December 1970, 14:00

Thailand
1

			1	2	3
1	(Japan) (Thailand)	Hiroe Yuki; Pachara Pattabongse	11; 5	11; 4
2	(Japan) (Thailand)	Etsuko Takenaka; Thongkam Kingmanee	5; 11	4; 11
3	(Japan) (Thailand)	Mariko Nishio / Hiroe Yuki; Sumol Chanklum / Petchroong Liengtrakulngam	15; 10	15; 7
4	(Japan) (Thailand)	Machiko Aizawa / Etsuko Takenaka; Thongkam Kingmanee / Pachara Pattabongse	15; 6	18; 15
5	(Japan) (Thailand)	Mariko Nishio; Sumol Chanklum				not played
