= Cycling at the 1966 Asian Games =

- Venue: Huamark Velodrome
- Dates: 11–20 December 1966

Cycling was contested at the 1966 Asian Games in Bangkok, Thailand from December 11 to 20.

== Medalists ==
=== Road ===
Event	Gold	Silver	Bronze
Road race	Pairote Roongtonkit; Thailand	Ahn Byung-hoon; South Korea	Choochart Warawoot; Thailand
Team road race	South Korea; Ahn Byung-hoon; Ahn Kwang-san; Lee Sun-bai	Thailand; Pairote Roongtonkit; Chainarong Sophonpong; Choochart Warawoot	South Vietnam; Đào Văn Nam; Phạm Văn Thanh; Trần Gia Thu
Team time trial	Japan; Yoshiharu Kubo; Kozo Nishimura; Takao Ono	South Korea; Ahn Byung-hoon; Cho Sung-hwan; Lee Sun-bai	Iran; Davoud Akhlaghi; Mehdi Doukchi; Esmaeil Hosseini

=== Track ===
Event	Gold	Silver	Bronze
1 km time trial	Preeda Chullamondhol; Thailand	Takao Shimomura; Japan	Fan Yue-tao; Republic of China
Individual pursuit	Preeda Chullamondhol; Thailand	Masayuki Goto; Japan	Esmaeil Hosseini; Iran
800 m mass start	Preeda Chullamondhol; Thailand	Kozo Nishimura; Japan	Trevor de Silva; Ceylon
1600 m mass start	Smaisuk Krisansuwan; Thailand	Claudio Romeo; Philippines	Takao Shimomura; Japan
4800 m mass start	Preeda Chullamondhol; Thailand	Liu Cheng-tao; Republic of China	Trevor de Silva; Ceylon
10000 m mass start	Masanori Tsuji; Japan	Chainarong Sophonpong; Thailand	Claudio Romeo; Philippines
Team pursuit	Japan; Morimasa Murakami; Takao Ono; Junichi Onodera	Thailand; Somchai Chantarasamrit; Pirom Choonlahoon; Preeda Chullamondhol; Smaisuk Krisansuwan	South Korea; Kim Jung-kil; Kim Kwang-sun; Kwon Jung-hyun; Suh Jung-sub
1600 m team time trial	Japan; Masayuki Goto; Morimasa Murakami; Junichi Onodera; Takao Shimomura	Thailand; Somchai Chantarasamrit; Preeda Chullamondhol; Narong Nilpecharat; Somkuan Seehapant	South Korea; Kim Jung-kil; Kim Kwang-sun; Kwon Jung-hyun; Sin Dong-in

== Medal table ==
Rank	Nation	Gold	Silver	Bronze	Total
1	Thailand (THA)	6	4	1	11
2	Japan (JPN)	4	3	1	8
3	South Korea (KOR)	1	2	2	5
4	Philippines (PHI)	0	1	1	2
4	Republic of China (ROC)	0	1	1	2
6	Ceylon (CEY)	0	0	2	2
6	Iran (IRN)	0	0	2	2
8	South Vietnam (VNM)	0	0	1	1
Totals (8 entries)		11	11	11	33
