= Malaysia at the 1970 Asian Games =

- IOC code: MAL
- NOC: Olympic Council of Malaysia
- Website: www.olympic.org.my (in English)

in Bangkok
- Competitors: 132 in 10 sports
- Flag bearer: Nashatar Singh Sidhu
- Medals Ranked 7th: Gold 5 Silver 1 Bronze 7 Total 13

Asian Games appearances (overview)
- 1954; 1958; 1962; 1966; 1970; 1974; 1978; 1982; 1986; 1990; 1994; 1998; 2002; 2006; 2010; 2014; 2018; 2022; 2026

Other related appearances
- North Borneo (1954, 1958, 1962); Sarawak (1962)

Malaysia competed in the 1970 Asian Games held in Bangkok, Thailand from 9 December 1970 to 20 December 1970. This country is ranked number 7 with 5 gold medals, 1 silver medals and 7 bronze medals.

== Medal summary ==
=== Medals by sport ===
Sport	Gold	Silver	Bronze	Total	Rank
Athletics	0	0	2	2	13
Badminton	3	0	3	6	2
Cycling	2	1	2	5	3
Total	5	1	7	13	7

=== Medallists ===
Medal	Name	Sport	Event
Gold	Punch Gunalan	Badminton	Men's singles
Gold	Ng Boon Bee; Punch Gunalan	Badminton	Men's doubles
Gold	Ng Boon Bee; Sylvia Ng Meow Eng	Badminton	Mixed doubles
Gold	Ng Joo Jan	Cycling	Men's road race
Gold	Daud Ibrahim	Cycling	Men's 1600 metres mass start
Silver	Chow Teck Beng; Ng Joo Ngan; Azizan Ramli; Omar Haji Saad	Cycling	Men's team road race
Bronze	Asir Victor; Hassan Osman; Thomboo Krishnan; Jayabalan Karuppiah	Athletics	Men's 4 x 400 metres relay
Bronze	Nashatar Singh Sidhu	Athletics	Men's javelin throw
Bronze	Sylvia Ng Meow Eng	Badminton	Women's singles
Bronze	Rosalind Singha Ang; Teoh Siew Yong	Badminton	Women's doubles
Bronze	Ng Boon Bee; Punch Gunalan	Badminton	Men's team
Bronze	Daud Ibrahim	Cycling	Men's 1 kilometre time trial
Bronze	Ng Joo Pong	Cycling	Men's 10000 metres mass start

== Athletics ==
Key

- Note– Ranks given for track events are within the athlete's heat only
- Q = Qualified for the next round
- q = Qualified for the next round as a fastest loser or, in field events, by position without achieving the qualifying target
- NR = National record
- N/A = Round not applicable for the event
- Bye = Athlete not required to compete in round

Men
Track event

Athlete	Event	Final	
Athlete	Event	Time	Rank
	4 × 400 m relay	3:13.0	3rd place, bronze medalist(s)

Field event

Athlete	Event	Final	
Athlete	Event	Distance	Rank
Nashatar Singh Sidhu	Javelin throw	67.34	3rd place, bronze medalist(s)

== Badminton ==
Athlete	Event	Final	Rank
Athlete	Event	Opposition Score	Rank
Punch Gunalan	Men's singles	Indonesia (INA); Muljadi; W	1st place, gold medalist(s)
Ng Boon Bee; Punch Gunalan	Men's doubles	Japan (JPN); Junji Honma; Shōichi Toganoo; W	1st place, gold medalist(s)
Ng Boon Bee; Punch Gunalan	Men's team		3rd place, bronze medalist(s)
Sylvia Ng Meow Eng	Women's singles		3rd place, bronze medalist(s)
Rosalind Singha Ang; Teoh Siew Yong	Women's doubles		3rd place, bronze medalist(s)
Ng Boon Bee; Sylvia Ng Meow Eng	Mixed doubles	Thailand (THA); Bandid Jaiyen; Pachara Pattabongs; W	1st place, gold medalist(s)

== Basketball ==
=== Men's tournament ===
Group C

Team	Pld	W	L
Republic of China	3	3	0
India	3	2	1
Thailand	3	1	2
Malaysia	3	0	3

Qualified for the finals

10 December

Thailand	80vs.	Malaysia

Nimibutr Indoor Stadium, National Sports Complex, Bangkok

11 December

Republic of China	82–62	Malaysia

Nimibutr Indoor Stadium, National Sports Complex, Bangkok

12 December

India	77–72	Malaysia

Nimibutr Indoor Stadium, National Sports Complex, Bangkok

Seventh to twelfth place classification

Team	Pld	W	L
Iran	5	5	0
Thailand	5	4	1
Malaysia	5	3	2
Singapore	5	2	3
South Vietnam	5	1	4
Hong Kong	5	0	5

14 December

Thailand	–79	Malaysia

Nimibutr Indoor Stadium, National Sports Complex, Bangkok

15 December

Malaysia	76–69	Singapore

Nimibutr Indoor Stadium, National Sports Complex, Bangkok

16 December

Iran	82–79	Malaysia
Scoring by half: 49-27, 33-52

Nimibutr Indoor Stadium, National Sports Complex, Bangkok

18 December

Malaysia	80–64	Hong Kong

Nimibutr Indoor Stadium, National Sports Complex, Bangkok

19 December

Malaysia	103–82	South Vietnam

Nimibutr Indoor Stadium, National Sports Complex, Bangkok

Ranked 9th in final standings

== Field hockey ==
=== Men's tournament ===
Bronze medal match

Malaysia	0–1	Japan

Bangkok

Ranked 4th in final standings

== Football ==
=== Men's tournament ===
Group B

Team	Pts	Pld	W	D	L	GF	GA	GD
Japan	6	3	3	0	0	4	1	+3
Burma	4	3	2	0	1	4	3	+1
Khmer Republic	2	3	1	0	2	3	3	0
Malaysia	0	3	0	0	3	0	4	−4

Qualified for the quarterfinals

Japan	1 – 0	Malaysia
Kunishige Kamamoto 34'

Malaysia	0 – 1	Burma
		Win Maung 33'

Malaysia	0 – 2	Khmer Republic
		Sleyman Selim 12'; Pen Phat 68'

Ranked 10th in final standings

== Water polo ==
=== Men's tournament ===
Ranked 6th in final standings
