= Gwon Jung-hyeon =

Gwon Jung-hyeon may refer to

- Gwon Jung-hyeon (politician) (1854–1934), Korean politician
- Gwon Jung-hyeon (cyclist) (1942–), South Korean cyclist
