= Bangkok Asian Games =

Bangkok Asian Games may refer to four different Asian Games held in Bangkok:

- 1966 Asian Games
- 1970 Asian Games
- 1978 Asian Games
- 1998 Asian Games
