= Song Jae-ung =

South Korean diver (born 1945)

Personal information
- Nationality: South Korean
- Born: 2 April 1945 (age 81) Seoul, Korea

Sport
- Sport: Diving
Medal record
Representing South Korea
Asian Games
Gold medal – first place	1970 Bangkok	10m platform
Bronze medal – third place	1966 Bangkok	10m platform
Bronze medal – third place	1970 Bangkok	3m springboard

Song Jae-ung (born 2 April 1945) is a South Korean diver. He competed at the 1964 Summer Olympics and the 1968 Summer Olympics.
