= 1970 Asian Games medal table =

- Left-right: Bhim Singh, Teymour Ghiasi, Hidehiko Tomizawa, 1970 Asian Games
- Location: Bangkok, Thailand

Highlights
- Most gold medals: Japan 74
- Most total medals: Japan 144
- Medalling NOCs: 16

The 1970 Asian Games medal table is a list of nations ranked by the medals won by their athletes during the multi-sport event, being held in Bangkok, Thailand from December 9, 1970, to December 20, 1970. The National Olympic Committees are ranked by number of gold medals first, with number of silver then bronze medals acting as the rank decider in the event of equal standing. Other alternative methods of ranking include listing by total medals.

== Medal table ==
* Host nation (Thailand)

Rank	Nation	Gold	Silver	Bronze	Total
1	Japan (JPN)	74	47	23	144
2	South Korea (KOR)	18	13	23	54
3	Thailand (THA)*	9	17	13	39
4	Iran (IRN)	9	7	7	23
5	India (IND)	6	9	10	25
6	Israel (ISR)	6	6	5	17
7	Malaysia (MAL)	5	1	7	13
8	Burma (BIR)	3	2	7	12
9	Indonesia (INA)	2	5	13	20
10	Ceylon (CEY)	2	2	0	4
11	Philippines (PHI)	1	9	12	22
12	Republic of China (ROC)	1	5	12	18
13	Pakistan (PAK)	1	2	7	10
14	Singapore (SIN)	0	6	9	15
15	Khmer Republic (KHM)	0	2	3	5
16	South Vietnam (VNM)	0	0	2	2
Totals (16 entries)		137	133	153	423
