= Ehara (surname) =

Ehara (written: 江原) is a Japanese surname. Notable people with the surname include:

- Masamitsu Ehara (江原 政光, born 1969), Japanese cyclist
- Naito Ehara (江原 騎士, born 1993), Japanese swimmer
- Shinjirō Ehara (江原 真二郎, born 1936), Japanese actor
- Tadashi Ehara, American game designer
- Yukiko Ehara, Japanese model, television personality, singer and actress
