= Afsharian =

Afsharian or افشاریان may refer to:

- Afsharid dynasty, Iranian dynasty ruling from 1736 to 1796
- Mehrdad Afsharian (born 1964), Iranian cyclist
