= Diving at the 1970 Asian Games =

- Venue: Visutdrarom Swimming Pool
- Dates: 12–15 December 1970

Diving was contested at the 1970 Asian Games in Bangkok, Thailand from December 12 to December 15, 1970.

== Medalists ==
=== Men ===
| Event | Gold | Silver | Bronze |
|---|---|---|---|
| 3 m springboard | Takashi Kioka; Japan | Billy Gumulya; Indonesia | Song Jae-ung; South Korea |
| 10 m platform | Song Jae-ung; South Korea | Toshio Otsubo; Japan | Toshiaki Hayashi; Japan |

=== Women ===
| Event | Gold | Silver | Bronze |
|---|---|---|---|
| 3 m springboard | Kanoko Mabuchi; Japan | Yoko Arimitsu; Japan | Mirnawati Hardjolukito; Indonesia |
| 10 m platform | Yoko Arimitsu; Japan | Kim Young-chae; South Korea | Tasanee Srivipat; Thailand |

== Medal table ==
| Rank | Nation | Gold | Silver | Bronze | Total |
|---|---|---|---|---|---|
| 1 | Japan (JPN) | 3 | 2 | 1 | 6 |
| 2 | South Korea (KOR) | 1 | 1 | 1 | 3 |
| 3 | Indonesia (INA) | 0 | 1 | 1 | 2 |
| 4 | Thailand (THA) | 0 | 0 | 1 | 1 |
| Totals (4 entries) | | 4 | 4 | 4 | 12 |
