= Equestrian Federation of India =

Governing body for equestrian sports in India

- Sport: Equestrian sports
- Jurisdiction: India
- Abbreviation: EFI
- Founded: 14 March 1967; 58 years ago
- Affiliation: International Federation for Equestrian Sports
- Affiliation date: 1971
- Regional affiliation: Asian Equestrian Federation
- Headquarters: T1 Station Road, Cariappa Marg, Delhi Cantt – 110 010
- Secretary: Col. Jaiveer Singh

Official website
- www.efinf.org
- (India)

The Equestrian Federation of India is the governing body for equestrian sports in India.

== History ==
Most civilians could not afford to own horses in the period following India's independence, and equestrian sports were primarily practiced by Indian Army officers. The Army re-established several major horse shows across the country that had been halted during World War II. In 1950s, the Army began seeking opportunities to send riders to compete at international events. However, all international competitions were conducted by the Fédération Équestre Internationale (FEI) which required participating riders to be sent by national federations. As India did not have such a federation, the Army established the Equestrian Federation of India (EFI) in 1967. General P.P. Kumaramangalam, Major General R.K.R. Balasubramanian, and several senior army officers are credited with setting up the EFI. The Federation held its first meeting on 14 March 1967 and officially proclaimed "the birth of the national Equestrian Federation of India" and defined its objectives. One of the EFI's urgent tasks was to "promote equine breeding and care and management of equines" as the Partition of India had resulted in the loss of West Punjab, the best horse breeding territory in British India, to Pakistan. The EFI became affiliated with FEI in 1971.

The EFI played an important role in establishing the Asian Equestrian Federation in 1978. The EFI convinced both Indian government officials and FEI to introduce equestrian events at the 1982 Asian Games which were to be hosted in India. Keen to develop equestrian sports in the country, FEI Secretary General Fritz O. Widmer agreed to the request and asked the EFI to host show jumping, eventing, and dressage competitions at the 1982 Asian Games. The EFI agreed to hold the show jumping and eventing competitions but stated that it did not have enough experience to host the dressage competition. Instead, the EFI proposed a new event called tent pegging and drafted rules for the competition which was approved by FEI. Equestrian sports (show jumping, eventing and tent pegging) were included for the first time at the 1982 Asian Games.
