= Boxing at the 1970 Asian Games =

Boxing competitions

- Venue: Indoor Stadium Huamark
- Dates: 10–15 December 1970

The Boxing Tournament at the 1970 Asian Games was held in Bangkok, Thailand from 10 December 1970 to 15 December 1970 in eleven weight categories.

South Korea topped the medal table with six gold medals.

== Medalists ==
Event	Gold	Silver	Bronze
Light flyweight (48 kg)	Kim Chung-bae; South Korea	Manolo Vicera; Philippines	Yoshimitsu Aragaki; Japan
Light flyweight (48 kg)	Kim Chung-bae; South Korea	Manolo Vicera; Philippines	Surapong Sripirom; Thailand
Flyweight (51 kg)	Jee Yong-ju; South Korea	Miyoji Tateyama; Japan	Chen Wei-jen; Republic of China
Flyweight (51 kg)	Jee Yong-ju; South Korea	Miyoji Tateyama; Japan	Ferry Moniaga; Indonesia
Bantamweight (54 kg)	Ricardo Fortaleza; Philippines	Win Maung; Burma	Idwan Anwar; Indonesia
Bantamweight (54 kg)	Ricardo Fortaleza; Philippines	Win Maung; Burma	Kim Tae-ho; South Korea
Featherweight (57 kg)	Kim Sung-eun; South Korea	Muniswamy Venu; India	Nemesio Gonzaga; Philippines
Featherweight (57 kg)	Kim Sung-eun; South Korea	Muniswamy Venu; India	Samad Mir; Pakistan
Lightweight (60 kg)	Kim Hyun-chi; South Korea	Tomiharu Tonosaki; Japan	Jootje Waney; Indonesia
Lightweight (60 kg)	Kim Hyun-chi; South Korea	Tomiharu Tonosaki; Japan	Thongchai Chandarasukhon; Thailand
Light welterweight (63.5 kg)	Bantow Srisook; Thailand	Khieu Soeun; Khmer Republic	Yasutsune Uehara; Japan
Light welterweight (63.5 kg)	Bantow Srisook; Thailand	Khieu Soeun; Khmer Republic	Eugenio Valmocina; Philippines
Welterweight (67 kg)	Jung Young-geun; South Korea	Long Savoen; Khmer Republic	Virat Vilarlak; Thailand
Welterweight (67 kg)	Jung Young-geun; South Korea	Long Savoen; Khmer Republic	Yoshitsugu Kawabe; Japan
Light middleweight (71 kg)	Park Hyung-suk; South Korea	Ni Ni; Burma	Nicolas Aquilino; Philippines
Light middleweight (71 kg)	Park Hyung-suk; South Korea	Ni Ni; Burma	Mohammad Saroukhani; Iran
Middleweight (75 kg)	Wiem Gommies; Indonesia	Arif Malik; Pakistan	Nipon Oraisri; Thailand
Middleweight (75 kg)	Wiem Gommies; Indonesia	Arif Malik; Pakistan	Gholam Hossein Pakmanesh; Iran
Light heavyweight (81 kg)	Marnit Triarooniaks; Thailand	Park Hyung-choon; South Korea	Rudy Siregar; Indonesia
Light heavyweight (81 kg)	Marnit Triarooniaks; Thailand	Park Hyung-choon; South Korea	Khizar Hayat; Pakistan
Heavyweight (+81 kg)	Hawa Singh; India	Omran Khatami; Iran	Kim Sang-man; South Korea
Heavyweight (+81 kg)	Hawa Singh; India	Omran Khatami; Iran	Sowar Shah; Pakistan

== Medal table ==
Rank	Nation	Gold	Silver	Bronze	Total
1	South Korea (KOR)	6	1	2	9
2	Thailand (THA)	2	0	4	6
3	Philippines (PHI)	1	1	3	5
4	India (IND)	1	1	0	2
5	Indonesia (INA)	1	0	4	5
6	Japan (JPN)	0	2	3	5
7	Burma (BIR)	0	2	0	2
7	Khmer Republic (KHM)	0	2	0	2
9	Pakistan (PAK)	0	1	3	4
10	Iran (IRN)	0	1	2	3
11	Republic of China (ROC)	0	0	1	1
Totals (11 entries)		11	11	22	44
