= Iran at the 1970 Asian Games =

- IOC code: IRN
- NOC: National Olympic Committee of the Islamic Republic of Iran

in Bangkok
- Competitors: 169 in 10 sports
- Flag bearer: Abdollah Movahed
- Medals Ranked 4th: Gold 9 Silver 7 Bronze 7 Total 23

Asian Games appearances (overview)
- 1951; 1954; 1958; 1962; 1966; 1970; 1974; 1978; 1982; 1986; 1990; 1994; 1998; 2002; 2006; 2010; 2014; 2018; 2022; 2026

Iran participated in the 1970 Asian Games held in the capital city of Bangkok. This country is ranked 4th with 9 gold medals in this edition of the Asiad.

== Medal summary ==
=== Medals by sport ===
Sport	Gold	Silver	Bronze	Total
Wrestling	6	2	1	9
Weightlifting	2	1	3	6
Athletics	1	2	0	3
Boxing	0	1	2	3
Cycling	0	1	1	2
Totals (5 entries)	9	7	7	23

== Results by event ==
=== Athletics ===
- Gold
  - Teymour Ghiassi - Men's high jump
- Silver
  - Jalal Keshmiri - Men's discus throw
  - Jalal Keshmiri - Men's shot put

=== Boxing ===
- Silver
  - Omran Khatami - Men's +81 kg
- Bronze
  - Mohammad Sarehkhani - Men's 71 kg
  - Gholamhossein Pakmanesh - Men's 75 kg

=== Cycling ===
==== Road ====
- Silver
  - Team - Men's team time trial
    - Team roster
      - Hassan Arianfar
      - Asghar Doroudi
      - Khosrow Haghgosha
      - Hossein Baharloo

==== Track ====
- Bronze
  - Team - Men's team pursuit
    - Team roster
      - Khosrow Haghgosha
      - Manouchehr Daneshmand
      - Hossein Baharloo
      - Asghar Doroudi

=== Weightlifting ===
Athlete	Event	Press		Snatch		Jerk		Total	
Athlete	Event	Result	Rank	Result	Rank	Result	Rank	Result	Rank
Mohammad Nasehi	Men's 52 kg	87.5	3	95.0	2	120.0	3	302.5	3rd place, bronze medalist(s)
Mohammad Nassiri	Men's 56 kg	120.0	1	102.5	2	142.5	1	365.0	1st place, gold medalist(s)
Amir Darmanaki	Men's 60 kg	95.0	4	100.0	3	130.0	3	325.0	4
Nasrollah Dehnavi	Men's 67.5 kg	140.0	1	125.0	2	160.0	2	425.0	1st place, gold medalist(s)
Daniel Gevargiz	Men's 75 kg	135.0	2	127.5	2	167.5	1	430.0	2nd place, silver medalist(s)
Taghi Rouhani	Men's 82.5 kg	122.5	4	110.0	5	162.5	4	395.0	4
Ebrahim Pourdejam	Men's 90 kg	130.0	3	130.0	3	165.0	3	425.0	3rd place, bronze medalist(s)
Houshang Kargarnejad	Men's 110 kg	135.0	3	120.0	1	157.5	3	412.5	3rd place, bronze medalist(s)

=== Wrestling ===
- Gold
  - Ebrahim Javadi - Men's 48 kg
  - Mohammad Ghorbani - Men's 52 kg
  - Shamseddin Seyed-Abbasi - Men's 62 kg
  - Abdollah Movahed - Men's 68 kg
  - Dariush Zakeri - Men's 90 kg
  - Eskandar Filabi - Men's +100 kg
- Silver
  - Mohammad Farhangdoust - Men's 74 kg
  - Ali Hajiloo - Men's 82 kg
- Bronze
  - Abolfazl Anvari - Men's 100 kg
