= Mirnawati Hardjolukito =

Indonesian diver

Personal information
- Nationality: Indonesian
- Born: 8 September 1953 (age 72)

Sport
- Sport: Diving
Medal record
Women's diving
Representing Indonesia
Asian Games
Bronze medal – third place	1970 Bangkok	3 metre springboard

Mirnawati Hardjolukito (born 8 September 1953) is an Indonesian diver. She competed in the women's 3 metre springboard event at the 1972 Summer Olympics.
