= Kim Kyung-sook =

South Korean cyclist (born 1967)

Personal information
- Born: 1 August 1967 (age 59)

Cycling career
- Sport: Cycling
Medal record
Women's road cycling
Representing South Korea
Asian Games
Gold medal – first place	1986 Seoul	Road race

Kim Kyung-sook (born 1 August 1967) is a South Korean former cyclist. She competed in the women's individual road race at the 1988 Summer Olympics.

She also won the gold medal at the 1986 Asian Games in Seoul.
