= Asia Triathlon =

International sports governing body

- Sport: Triathlon
- Jurisdiction: Asia
- Membership: 38
- Abbreviation: AST
- Founded: 1991
- Affiliation: TRI
- Headquarters: Riyadh, Saudi Arabia
- President: Prince Fahad Bin Jalawi Al Saud

Official website
- asia.triathlon.org

Asia Triathlon, previously known as the Asian Triathlon Confederation (ASTC) is an association of the World Triathlon's member federations from Asia.

== Competitions administered by the AST ==
- Triathlon at the Asian Games
