= Badminton at the 1970 Asian Games =

- Venue: Kittikachorn Stadium
- Dates: 9–20 December

Badminton tournaments were held for the third time at the 6th Asian Games in 1970 in Bangkok, Thailand from 9 to 20 December 1970.

Singles, doubles, and team events were contested for both men and women. Mixed Doubles were also contested.

== Medalists ==
Event	Gold	Silver	Bronze
Men's singles	Punch Gunalan; Malaysia	Muljadi; Indonesia	Sangob Rattanusorn; Thailand
Men's singles	Punch Gunalan; Malaysia	Muljadi; Indonesia	Ippei Kojima; Japan
Men's doubles	Malaysia; Ng Boon Bee; Punch Gunalan	Japan; Junji Honma; Shoichi Toganoo	Indonesia; Rudy Hartono; Indra Gunawan
Men's doubles	Malaysia; Ng Boon Bee; Punch Gunalan	Japan; Junji Honma; Shoichi Toganoo	Thailand; Chavalert Chumkum; Pornchai Sakuntaniyom
Men's team	Indonesia; Indra Gunawan; Rudy Hartono; Indratno; Mintarja; Muljadi	Thailand; Soonchai Akyapisut; Chavalert Chumkum; Bandid Jaiyen; Sangob Rattanusorn; Pornchai Sakuntaniyom; Tuly Ulao	Malaysia; Punch Gunalan; Lee Kok Peng; Abdul Rahman Mohamed; Ng Boon Bee; Ng Tat Wai; Tan Soon Hooi
Men's team	Indonesia; Indra Gunawan; Rudy Hartono; Indratno; Mintarja; Muljadi	Thailand; Soonchai Akyapisut; Chavalert Chumkum; Bandid Jaiyen; Sangob Rattanusorn; Pornchai Sakuntaniyom; Tuly Ulao	Japan; Junji Honma; Ippei Kojima; Hiroshi Taniguchi; Shoichi Toganoo
Women's singles	Hiroe Yuki; Japan	Thongkam Kingmanee; Thailand	Minarni; Indonesia
Women's singles	Hiroe Yuki; Japan	Thongkam Kingmanee; Thailand	Sylvia Ng; Malaysia
Women's doubles	Japan; Etsuko Takenaka; Machiko Aizawa	Indonesia; Retno Kustijah; Nurhaena	Malaysia; Rosalind Singha Ang; Teoh Siew Yong
Women's doubles	Japan; Etsuko Takenaka; Machiko Aizawa	Indonesia; Retno Kustijah; Nurhaena	Thailand; Sumol Chanklum; Achara Pattabongs
Women's team	Japan; Machiko Aizawa; Mariko Nishio; Etsuko Takenaka; Hiroe Yuki	Thailand; Sumol Chanklum; Boobpa Kaentong; Thongkam Kingmanee; Petchroong Liengtrakulngam; Achara Pattabongs	South Korea; Han Sook-ee; Joon Im-soon; Kang Young-sin; Kim Jong-ja
Women's team	Japan; Machiko Aizawa; Mariko Nishio; Etsuko Takenaka; Hiroe Yuki	Thailand; Sumol Chanklum; Boobpa Kaentong; Thongkam Kingmanee; Petchroong Liengtrakulngam; Achara Pattabongs	Indonesia; Utami Dewi Kurniawan; Retno Kustijah; Minarni; Nurhaena; Poppy Tumengkol; Theresia Widiastuti
Mixed doubles	Malaysia; Ng Boon Bee; Sylvia Ng	Thailand; Bandid Jaiyen; Achara Pattabongs	Japan; Ippei Kojima; Etsuko Takenaka
Mixed doubles	Malaysia; Ng Boon Bee; Sylvia Ng	Thailand; Bandid Jaiyen; Achara Pattabongs	Indonesia; Rudy Hartono; Minarni

== Medal table ==
Rank	Nation	Gold	Silver	Bronze	Total
1	Japan (JPN)	3	1	3	7
2	Malaysia (MAL)	3	0	3	6
3	Indonesia (INA)	1	2	4	7
4	Thailand (THA)	0	4	3	7
5	South Korea (KOR)	0	0	1	1
Totals (5 entries)		7	7	14	28

== Semifinal results ==
Discipline	Winner	Runner-up	Score
Men's singles	(Malaysia) Punch Gunalan	(Thailand) Sangob Rattanusorn	18–17, 15–10
Men's singles	(Indonesia) Muljadi	(Japan) Ippei Kojima	17–15, 11–15, 15–10
Women's singles	(Japan) Hiroe Yuki	(Indonesia) Minarni	7–11, 7–8
Women's singles	(Thailand) Thongkam Kingmanee	(Malaysia) Sylvia Ng	11–7, 11–4
Men's doubles	(Malaysia) Ng Boon Bee (Malaysia) Punch Gunalan	(Indonesia) Rudy Hartono (Indonesia) Indra Gunawan	15–12, 10–15, 15–10
Men's doubles	(Japan) Junji Honma (Japan) Shoichi Toganoo	(Thailand) Chavalert Chumkum (Thailand) Pornchai Sakuntaniyom	15–8, 15–8
Women's doubles	(Japan) Machiko Aizawa (Japan) Etsuko Takenaka	(Thailand) Achara Pattabongs (Thailand) Sumol Chanklum	15–6, 15–2
Women's doubles	(Indonesia) Nurhaena (Indonesia) Retno Kustijah	(Malaysia) Teoh Siew Yong (Malaysia) Rosalind Singha Ang	15–5, 15–10
Mixed doubles	(Malaysia) Ng Boon Bee (Malaysia) Sylvia Ng	(Japan) Ippei Kojima (Japan) Etsuko Takenaka	–, –
Mixed doubles	(Thailand) Bandid Jaiyen (Thailand) Achara Pattabongs	(Indonesia) Rudy Hartono (Indonesia) Minarni	walkover

== Final results ==
Discipline	Winner	Finalist	Score
Men's singles	(Malaysia) Punch Gunalan	(Indonesia) Muljadi	4–15, 15–3, 15–12
Women's singles	(Japan) Hiroe Yuki	(Thailand) Thongkam Kingmanee	12–9, 11–8
Men's doubles	(Malaysia) Ng Boon Bee (Malaysia) Punch Gunalan	(Japan) Junji Honma (Japan) Shoichi Toganoo	5–15, 15–8, 15–7
Women's doubles	(Japan) Machiko Aizawa (Japan) Etsuko Takenaka	(Indonesia) Nurhaena (Indonesia) Retno Kustijah	15–11, 15–6
Mixed doubles	(Malaysia) Ng Boon Bee (Malaysia) Sylvia Ng	(Thailand) Bandid Jaiyen (Thailand) Achara Pattabongs	18–13, 11–15, 15–10
