= Deogracias Asuncion =

Filipino cyclist (born 1956)

Personal information
- Born: May 1, 1956 (age 70)
- Height: 163 cm (5 ft 4 in)
- Weight: 54 kg (119 lb)

Cycling career
- Sport: Cycling
Medal record
Men's cycling
Representing Philippines
Asian Games
Bronze medal – third place	1982 New Delhi	Track team pursuit

Deogracias Asuncion (born May 1, 1956) is a Filipino former cyclist. Competing in the sprint and points race events at the 1984 Summer Olympics, Asuncion was the only Filipino cyclist to compete in more than one event for that edition of the games.

Asuncion was also among five cyclists competing for the Philippines at the 1982 Asian Games in New Delhi. With three other teammates, he won a bronze medal in the 4,000 meter team pursuit event.
