= Cycling at the 1978 Asian Games =

- Venue: Huamark Velodrome
- Dates: 11–19 December 1978

Cycling was contested at the 1978 Asian Games in Huamark Velodrome, Bangkok, Thailand.

== Medalists ==
=== Road ===
Event	Gold	Silver	Bronze
Road race	Yoshitaka Nihei; Japan	Saleem Shanati; Iraq	Jiang Ming; China
Team time trial	Japan; Yoshitaka Nihei; Toshiaki Nishizawa; Tsutomu Okabori; Katsuji Teraguchi	South Korea; Lee Young-kyu; Shin In-soo; Shin Nam-soo; Yang Joon-seng	China; Guo Demao; Li Jianmin; Sun Zhanbo; Wu Zengren

=== Track ===
Event	Gold	Silver	Bronze
Sprint	Yoshikazu Cho; Japan	Takashi Ebina; Japan	Park Il-woo; South Korea
1 km time trial	Lee Kwan-sun; South Korea	Takashi Ebina; Japan	Zhang Lihua; China
Individual pursuit	Toshiaki Ikeura; Japan	Park Il-woo; South Korea	Xu Yongqing; China
Team pursuit	South Korea; Lee Jong-moon; Lee Kwan-sun; Park Il-woo; Shin Nam-soo	China; Huang Jun; Liu Fu; Ma Jianmin; Wu Shucheng	Japan; Kazuhiro Arai; Toshiaki Ikeura; Akira Kunisue; Hiroyashi Soeta

== Medal table ==
Rank	Nation	Gold	Silver	Bronze	Total
1	Japan (JPN)	4	2	1	7
2	South Korea (KOR)	2	2	1	5
3	China (CHN)	0	1	4	5
4	Iraq (IRQ)	0	1	0	1
Totals (4 entries)		6	6	6	18
