= Ng Joo Ngan =

Malaysian cyclist

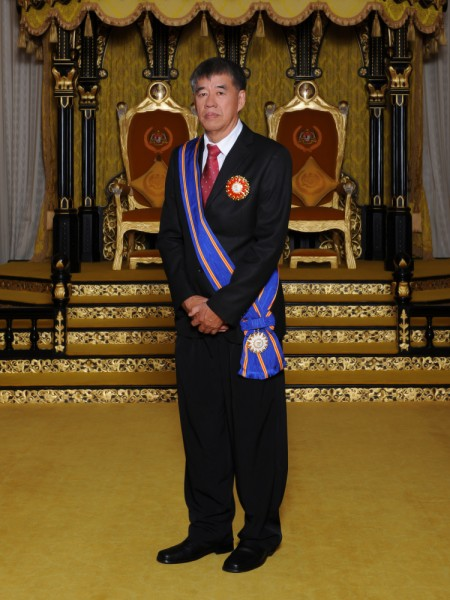
- Ng Joo Ngan

Personal information
- Full name: Ng Joo Ngan
- Born: 21 August 1947 (age 79) Kuala Lumpur, Selangor, Malayan Union
- Relative: Ng Joo Pong (brother)

Chinese name
- Traditional Chinese: 黃裕雁
- Simplified Chinese: 黄裕雁
- Hanyu Pinyin: Huáng Yùyàn
- Jyutping: Wong4 Jyu6 Ngaan6
- Hokkien POJ: N̂g Jū-gān
- Tâi-lô: N̂g Jū-gān

Cycling career
- Sport: Cycling
Medal record
Representing Malaysia
Men's road cycling
Asian Games
Gold medal – first place	1970 Bangkok	Road race
Silver medal – second place	1970 Bangkok	Team road race

Datuk Ng Joo Ngan (simplified Chinese: 黄裕雁; traditional Chinese: 黃裕雁; pinyin: Huáng Yùyàn; Jyutping: Wong4 Jyu6 Ngaan6; Pe̍h-ōe-jī: N̂g Jū-gān, born 21 August 1947, Kuala Lumpur, Malaysia) is considered one of the most successful cyclists in Malaysia history, having won the most competitions and the Asian Games.

== Personal achievements ==
1966 Represented Malaysia for ASIA Games, Bangkok

- Overall 4th placing for TEAM time trial

1967 Represented Malaysia for SEAP Games, Kuala Lumpur

- Bronze medal for 4 km Team pursuit
- Silver medal for 100 km Team time trial
- Bronze medal for 200 km road race

1968 National Champion for 40 km Individual time trial

- National Champion for 25 km Criterium race

1970 National Champion for Track & Road race in Seremban

- Represented Malaysia for Tour of Jawa
- Overall Team & Individual Champion
- Represented Malaysia for ASIA Games, Bangkok
- GOLD medal for 200 km road race (Record Holder)
- Silver medal for 200 km Team road race

1971 National Champion for Individual road race of Tour of Malaysia

- 8 days race totalling 1,020 km
- Awarded "Sportsman of the Year 1970"

1973 Represented Malaysia for SEAP Games, Singapore

- Silver medal for 100 km Team road race
- Bronze medal for 100 km Team time trial

1974 National Champion for 200 km road race.
