= Mohammad Ali Mohammadi =

Iranian cyclist (born 1951)

Personal information
- Born: 30 March 1951 (age 75) Mianeh, Iran

Cycling career
- Sport: Cycling
Medal record
Representing Iran
Men's Road cycling
Asian Games
Bronze medal – third place	1982 New Delhi	Team time trial

Mohammad Ali Mohammadi Acha-Cheloi (Persian: محمدعلی محمدی آچاچلویی, born 30 March 1951 in Mianeh) is an Iranian former cyclist. He competed in the individual road race event at the 1976 Summer Olympics. He also participated at the 1982 Asian Games and won a bronze medal in team time trial event.
