= International Pencak Silat Federation =

- Abbreviation: IPSF, PERSILAT
- Formation: 11 March 1980
- Purpose: Martial art and sport
- Headquarters: TMII, Jakarta
- Location: Indonesia
- Region served: International/ Worldwide
- Official language: English; Indonesian; Malay
- President: Prabowo Subianto
- Website: ipsf-persilat.org

The International Pencak Silat Federation (IPSF, Indonesian: Persekutuan Pencak Silat Antarabangsa, PERSILAT), which was founded in Jakarta on 11 March 1980, is the only international Pencak Silat organization in the world. The International Pencak Silat Federation (IPSF) is the largest international governing body of competitive pencak silat (aka sport silat) with 66 member countries. IPSF is the only pencak silat organization recognised by the Olympic Council of Asia and has more than five million members. The IPSF organizes the Junior and Senior World Pencak Silat Championships, which are each held every other year. The President of the IPSF is Prabowo Subianto, and the headquarters are located in TMII, Jakarta, Indonesia.

== Mission ==
To promote, expand, and improve worldwide, the practice of Pencak Silat, with its core value to support the achievement of social, economic development, human progress, world peace, and the millennium development goals, propagating the Olympic Movement through the sport of Pencak Silat and supporting all members in unity to achieve the common goal of building a better world.

== Membership ==
As of 2021, the global membership of the International Pencak Silat Federation stands at 67 national federations, spanning five continents.

=== Continental Federations ===
- Asian Pencak Silat Federation (APSIF)
- European Pencak Silat Federation (EPSF)
- Pencak Silat Federation of Americas (PSFA)
- African Pencak Silat Federation (APSF)

=== National Federations ===
Asia			
Afghanistan	Bangladesh	Brunei Darussalam	Cambodia
China	Chinese Taipei	East Timor	India
Indonesia (IPSI)	Iran	Iraq	Japan
Jordan	Kazakhstan	South Korea	Kuwait
Kyrgyzstan	Laos	Malaysia	Nepal
Myanmar	Pakistan	Palestine	Philippines
Saudi Arabia	Singapore	Sri Lanka	Tajikistan
Thailand	Turkmenistan	Uzbekistan	Vietnam
Yemen

Europe			
Armenia	Austria	Azerbaijan	Belgium
Cyprus	Estonia	France	Germany
Greece	Italy	Latvia	Moldova
Netherlands	Russia	Serbia	Slovakia
Spain	Switzerland	Turkey	Ukraine
United Kingdom

North and South America			
Brazil	Canada	Chile	Suriname
United States of America

Africa			
Algeria	Egypt	Morocco	Nigeria
Uganda	South Africa	Ghana	

Oceania	
Australia	New Zealand

== Competition ==
Pencak Silat competition features 4 event categories:

- Sparring / Tanding
- Artistic / Seni (aka TGR)
  - Tunggal - Solo Performance
  - Ganda - Choreographed Pairs Performance
  - Regu - Synchronized Group Performance

=== Sparring / Tanding ===
Tanding sparring is a full contact event that takes place on a 10 x 10 meter matted arena inscribed with a circular match ground that is 8 meters in diameter. Tanding matches are carried out in three two-minute rounds. Competitors wear black uniforms and black body torso protectors covering the chest, ribs, and back. Attacks to the head are not permitted. Technical points are weighted as follows:

- 1 point - Successful and visible hand attack / contact (punch, hand-strike, elbow strike, etc.)
- 2 points - Successful and visible leg attack / contact (kick, knee-strike, etc.)
- 3 points - Successful dropping technique (throw, sweep, scissor, etc.)

To obtain a technical score, an athlete must apply the Pencak Silat Principle wherein attacks are linked together with Step Patterns (Pola Langkah) and On Guard Positions (Sikap Pasang).

In 2021 the IPSF updated tanding rules to include a wider variety of permissible techniques, added emphasis on the ``Pencak Silat Principle``, and additional ground techniques and submissions.

=== Artistic / Seni ===
The tunggal or solo performance event requires the athlete to perform Jurus Baku Tunggal, a pre-defined solo routine that showcase a variety of pencak silat moves. The jurus consists of three sections: 1) empty hand, 2) golok and 3) toya (staff). Performances are judged objectively on the presence of all required sections and motions, time (3 minutes +/- 5 seconds) and subjectively on stability, stamina, comprehension and depth of motion.

In the ganda or choreographed pairs performance a duo of athletes perform their own specially choreographed routine consisting of any combination of attack and defense sequences. In 2021 permissible weapons were expanded to include a wider variety of weapons hailing from Southeast Asia including, but not limited to cambuk/pecut (whip), clurit (sickle), golok (machete), knife, kerambit, toya (staff), tekpi / cabang (truncheon/sai)

Regu or synchronized group performance features a trio of athletes performing Jurus Baku Regu, a pre-defined routine in sync as a team. Regu features a showcase of Pencak Silat motion, but unlike the Tunggal category is performed solely empty-hand without weapons.

== Guardian Girls Pencak Silat ==
On May 18, 2026, at the Official Residence of the Ambassador of Japan in Jakarta, Indonesia, the International Pencak Silat Federation (IPSF-PERSILAT) and Guardian Girls International (GGI) signed a historic Memorandum of Understanding to globally launch Guardian Girls Pencak Silat (GGPS), a worldwide initiative dedicated to safeguarding women and adolescent girls, advancing gender equality, and combating gender-based violence through Pencak Silat-based education, training, and leadership development.

== See also ==
- Pencak Silat
- Silat
- Silat Harimau
