= Daud Ibrahim =

Malaysian cyclist (1947–2010)

Personal information
- Born: 20 April 1947 Batu Pahat, British Malaya
- Died: 11 November 2010 (aged 63) Rembau, Malaysia

Cycling career
- Sport: Cycling
Medal record
Representing Malaysia
Men's track cycling
Asian Games
Bronze medal – third place	1970 Bangkok	1 km time trial
Gold medal – first place	1970 Bangkok	1600 m mass start

Daud Ibrahim (20 April 1947 – 11 November 2010) was a Malaysian cyclist. He competed in four events at the 1972 Summer Olympics.

Daud died on 11 November 2010, when his car collided with a trailer on the North–South Expressway.
