= Asian Equestrian Federation =

International sports governing body

Asian Equestrian Federation AEF
- Sport: Equestrian
- Official website: asianef.org

History
- Year of formation: December 1978; 47 years ago in Bangkok, Thailand

Demographics
- Membership size: 35 members

Affiliations
- International federation: International Federation for Equestrian Sports (FEI)
- FEI member since: 1978
- Other affiliation(s): Olympic Council of Asia

Governance
- President: (Qatar) Hamad Abdulrahman Al-Attiyah

Headquarters
- Address: Al-Furusya, Al-Rayyan, Doha
- Country: Qatar
- Secretary General: (Qatar) Bader Mohammed Al-Darwish
- Official language(s): English

The Asian Equestrian Federation is the governing body of equestrian in Asia. It is one of the five continental confederations making up the International Federation for Equestrian Sports. AEF was formed in 1978 in Bangkok, Thailand. AEF has headquarters in Doha, Qatar and consists of 35 member federations.

== Tournaments ==
- Asian Games

== Members ==
Regional Group 1

- Afghanistan
- Islamic Republic of Iran
- Kazakhstan
- Kyrgyzstan
- Turkmenistan
- Uzbekistan

Regional Group 2

- China
- Chinese Taipei
- Hong Kong, China
- Japan
- South Korea
- Mongolia

Regional Group 3

- Brunei
- India
- Indonesia
- Malaysia
- Myanmar
- Islamic Republic of Pakistan
- Philippines
- Singapore
- Thailand
- Cambodia
- Sri Lanka
- Nepal

Regional Group 4

- Bahrain
- Iraq
- Kuwait
- Oman
- United Arab Emirates

Regional Group 5

- Jordan
- Lebanon
- Palestine
- Qatar
- Saudi Arabia
- Syria
