= Ng Joo Pong =

Malaysian cyclist (born 1946)

Personal information
- Full name: Ng Joo Pong
- Nickname: Joe Ng
- Born: 19 June 1946 Kuala Lumpur, Selangor, Malayan Union
- Died: 21 October 2026 (aged 80) Petaling Jaya, Selangor, Malaysia
- Relative: Ng Joo Ngan (brother)

Cycling career
- Sport: Cycling
Medal record
Representing Malaysia
Men's road bicycle racing
SEAP Games
Silver medal – second place	1965 Kuala Lumpur	1000m individual road trial
Silver medal – second place	1965 Kuala Lumpur	10000m individual massed
Silver medal – second place	1965 Kuala Lumpur	200km team road trial
Bronze medal – third place	1965 Kuala Lumpur	4000m individual pursuit
Bronze medal – third place	1967 Bangkok	1000m individual road trial
Bronze medal – third place	1967 Bangkok	4000m individual pursuit
Men's track cycling
Asian Games
Bronze medal – third place	1970 Bangkok	1600 m mass start

Ng Joo Pong (Chinese: 黄裕鹏; 19 June 1946 – 21 October 2026) was a Malaysian cyclist who represented Malaysia at the 1964 and 1968 Summer Olympics and the 1970 Asian Games.

His younger brother, Ng Joo Ngan, was also a champion cyclist.

Ng died on 21 October 2026, at the age of 80.
