= Masatoshi Ichikawa =

Japanese racing cyclist (born 1961)

Personal information
- Born: January 11, 1961 (age 65) Tokyo, Japan

Cycling career
- Sport: Cycling
- Current team: Retired
- Discipline: Road
- Role: Rider

Professional teams
- 1987–1989: Hitachi
- 1990: Frank–Toyo
- 1991–1992: Bleiker
- 1993: Navigare–Blue Storm
- 1994: Inoac-Deki

Masatoshi Ichikawa (市川 雅敏, Ichikawa Masatoshi; born 11 January 1961) was a pioneering Japanese professional racing cyclist. He was the first Japanese to ride professionally in Europe, riding for such teams as the Belgian team Hitachi and the Swiss team Bleiker in the late 1980s and early 1990s. He was also the first to complete a Grand Tour event, finishing 50th in the 1990 Giro d'Italia.

== Major results ==
1992
6th Giro di Toscana
7th Japan Cup

=== General classification results timeline ===
Race	1990
Vuelta a España	—
Giro d'Italia	50
Tour de France	—
