= Wang Shusen =

Chinese cyclist

Personal information
- Born: 19 January 1967 (age 59)

Cycling career
- Sport: Cycling

Wang Shusen (born 19 January 1967) is a Chinese former cyclist. He competed in two events at the 1992 Summer Olympics.
