= Zhou Lingmei =

Chinese cyclist

Personal information
- Born: 28 March 1968 (age 58) Rugao, Jiangsu, China

Cycling career
- Sport: Cycling

Zhou Lingmei (born 28 March 1968) is a Chinese former cyclist. She competed in the women's individual pursuit at the 1992 Summer Olympics.
