= Dashnyamyn Tömör-Ochir =

Mongolian cyclist (born 1964)

Personal information
- Born: 13 August 1964 (age 62)

Cycling career
- Sport: Cycling

Dashnyamyn Tömör-Ochir (born 13 August 1964) is a Mongolian former cyclist. He competed at the 1992 Summer Olympics and the 1996 Summer Olympics.
