= Won Chang-yong =

South Korean cyclist

Personal information
- Born: 10 February 1973 (age 53)

Cycling career
- Sport: Cycling

Won Chang-yong (born 10 February 1973) is a South Korean former cyclist. He competed in the team pursuit at the 1992 Summer Olympics.
