= Tsutomu Okabori =

Japanese cyclist

Personal information
- Born: 10 July 1957 (age 69)

Cycling career
- Sport: Cycling

Tsutomu Okabori (岡堀 勉, Okabori Tsutomu; born 10 July 1957) is a Japanese former cyclist. He competed in the team pursuit event at the 1976 Summer Olympics and 1978 Asian Games. He was also a professional keirin cyclist.
