= Han Shuxiang =

Chinese cyclist (born 1965)

Personal information
- Born: 26 August 1965 (age 61)

Cycling career
- Sport: Cycling

Han Shuxiang (Chinese: 韩树祥; born 26 August 1965) is a Chinese former cyclist. He competed in the team time trial event at the 1984 Summer Olympics and 1986 Asian Games.
