= Kriengsak Varavudhi =

Thai cyclist

Personal information
- Born: 13 September 1948 (age 78) Bangkok, Thailand
- Height: 5 ft 9 in (175 cm)
- Weight: 64 kg (141 lb)

Cycling career
- Sport: Cycling

Kriengsak Varavudhi (born 13 September 1948) is a former Thai cyclist. He competed in the men's sprint at the 1968 Summer Olympics.
