= Fumiharu Miyamoto =

Japanese cyclist (born 1969)

Personal information
- Born: 31 March 1969 (age 57) Wakayama, Japan

Cycling career
- Sport: Cycling

Fumiharu Miyamoto (宮本 文晴, Miyamoto Fumiharu; born 31 March 1969) is a Japanese former cyclist. He competed in the team pursuit event at the 1988 Summer Olympics. He later rode for the Nippon Hodo Racing Team (a precursor of Team Nippo), and after retiring, served as a coach for the Japan Cycling Federation.
