= An Woo-hyok =

South Korean cyclist (born 1964)

Personal information
- Born: 14 January 1964 (age 62)

Cycling career
- Sport: Cycling

An Woo-hyok (Korean: 안우혁; Hanja: 安優爀 born 14 January 1964) is a South Korean former cyclist. He competed in the team pursuit event at the 1988 Summer Olympics.
