= Cho Duk-haeng =

South Korean cyclist (born 1966)

Personal information
- Born: 1 November 1966 (age 59)

Cycling career
- Sport: Cycling

Cho Duk-haeng (born 1 November 1966) is a South Korean former cyclist. He competed in the team time trial at the 1988 Summer Olympics.
