= Park Se-ryong =

South Korean cyclist

Personal information
- Born: 13 August 1959 (age 67)

Cycling career
- Sport: Cycling

Park Se-ryong (born 13 August 1959) is a South Korean former cyclist. He competed in the individual road race event at the 1984 Summer Olympics and 1982 Asian Games.
