= Batsükhiin Khayankhyarvaa =

Mongolian cyclist (born 1958)

Personal information
- Born: 27 November 1958 (age 67)

Cycling career
- Sport: Cycling

Batsükhiin Khayankhyarvaa (born 27 November 1958) is a Mongolian former cyclist. He competed in the individual road race and team time trial events at the 1980 Summer Olympics and 1990 Asian Games.
