= Shin Dae-chul =

South Korean cyclist

Personal information
- Born: 17 August 1959 (age 67)

Cycling career
- Sport: Cycling

Shin Dae-chul (born 17 August 1959) is a South Korean former cyclist. He competed at the 1984 Summer Olympics and the 1988 Summer Olympics and 1986 Asian Games.
