= Son Yak-sun =

South Korean cyclist

Personal information
- Born: 10 May 1966 (age 60)

Cycling career
- Sport: Cycling

Son Yak-sun (Korean: 손약선; Hanja: 孫藥仙; born 10 May 1966) is a South Korean former cyclist. She competed in the women's road race event at the 1984 Summer Olympics and 1986 Asian Games.
