= Guo Xinghong =

Chinese cyclist (born 1972)

Personal information
- Full name: Guo Xinghong
- Born: 1 April 1972 (age 54) China
- Height: 164 cm (5 ft 5 in)
- Weight: 62 kg (137 lb)

Cycling career
- Sport: Cycling
- Discipline: Road cycling
- Role: Rider

Guo Xinghong (simplified Chinese: 郭杏红; traditional Chinese: 郭杏紅; pinyin: Guō Xìnghóng; born 1 April 1972) is a road cyclist from China. She represented her nation at the 1996 Summer Olympics in the women's road race.
