= Keiji Kojima =

Japanese cyclist (born 1969)

Personal information
- Born: 9 November 1969 (age 56) Kanazawa, Japan

Cycling career
- Sport: Cycling

Keiji Kojima (小嶋 敬二, Kojima Keiji; born 9 November 1969) is a Japanese cyclist. He competed in two events at the 1992 Summer Olympics. He is also a professional keirin cyclist with over 600 wins. He won the best keirin cyclist of the year award in 2007.
