= Koichi Azuma =

Japanese keirin cyclist (born 1966)

Personal information
- Born: 24 October 1966 (age 59) Kōriyama, Japan

Cycling career
- Sport: Cycling

Koichi Azuma (我妻 広一, Azuma Kōichi; born 24 October 1966) is a Japanese former cyclist. He competed in the team pursuit event at the 1988 Summer Olympics. He later became a professional keirin cyclist with more than 200 wins.
