= Mehrdad Afsharian =

Iranian cyclist (born 1964)

Personal information
- Full name: Mehrdad Afsharian Torshiz
- Born: 31 October 1964 (age 61)

Cycling career
- Sport: Cycling
Medal record
Representing Iran
Men's track cycling and road cycling
Asian Games
Bronze medal – third place	1982 New Delhi	Team time trial
Bronze medal – third place	1986 Seoul	Individual pursuit

Mehrdad Afsharian Tarshiz (Persian: مهرداد افشاریان ترشیز, born 31 October 1964) is an Iranian former cyclist. He competed in two events at the 1992 Summer Olympics.
