= Lu Suyan =

Chinese cyclist

Personal information
- Born: 29 May 1965 (age 61)

Cycling career
- Sport: Cycling

Lu Suyan (born 29 May 1965) is a Chinese former cyclist. She competed at the 1984 Summer Olympics and the 1988 Summer Olympics and 1990 Asian Games.
