= Yoshihiro Tsumuraya =

Japanese cyclist

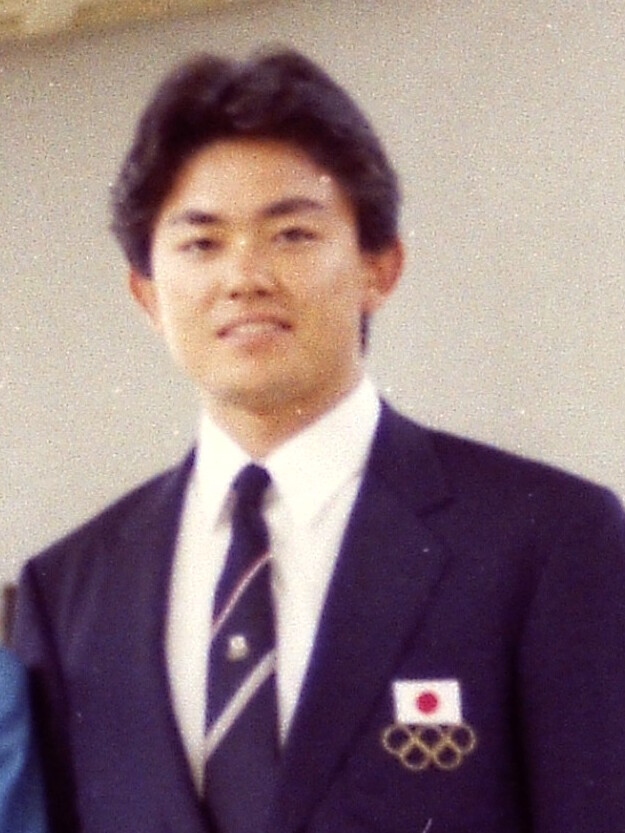

Personal information
- Born: 1 October 1964 (age 62) Kōriyama, Fukushima, Japan

Cycling career
- Sport: Cycling

Yoshihiro Tsumuraya (円谷 義広, Tsumuraya Yoshihiro; born 1 October 1964) is a Japanese former cyclist. He competed at the 1984 Summer Olympics and the 1988 Summer Olympics and 1986 Asian Games.
