= Makio Madarame =

Japanese cyclist

Personal information
- Born: 1 February 1972 (age 54) Shirakawa, Fukushima, Japan

Cycling career
- Sport: Cycling

Makio Madarame (班目 真紀夫, Madarame Makio; born 1 February 1972) is a Japanese former cyclist. He competed in the team pursuit at the 1992 Summer Olympics. He later became a teacher and coach at a high school in Fukushima Prefecture.
