= Kim Yong-kyu =

South Korean cyclist (born 1971)

Personal information
- Born: 12 November 1971 (age 54)

Cycling career
- Sport: Cycling

Kim Yong-kyu (born 12 November 1971) is a South Korean former cyclist. He competed at the 1988 Summer Olympics and the 1992 Summer Olympics.
