= Naokiyo Hashisako =

Japanese cyclist (born 1971)

Personal information
- Born: 14 November 1971 (age 54) Ōita, Japan

Cycling career
- Sport: Cycling

Naokiyo Hashisako (橋佐古 直清, Hashisako Naokiyo; born 14 November 1971) is a Japanese former cyclist. He competed in the team pursuit at the 1992 Summer Olympics.
