= Mitsugi Sarudate =

Japanese cyclist (born 1962)

Mitsugu Sarudate
Personal information
- Born: 18 December 1962 (age 63) Iwate, Japan

Cycling career
- Sport: Cycling

Mitsugu Sarudate (猿館 貢, Sarudate Mitsugu; born 18 December 1962) is a Japanese former cyclist. He competed in the team pursuit event at the 1984 Summer Olympics and 1982 Asian Games.
