= Chung Jum-sik =

South Korean cyclist (born 1968)

Personal information
- Born: 22 April 1968 (age 58)

Cycling career
- Sport: Cycling

Chung Jum-sik (born 22 April 1968) is a South Korean former cyclist. He competed in the team pursuit event at the 1988 Summer Olympics.
