= Zhu Zhengjun =

Chinese cyclist

Personal information
- Born: 16 November 1971 (age 54)

Cycling career
- Sport: Cycling

Zhu Zhengjun (born 16 November 1971) is a Chinese former cyclist. He competed in two events at the 1992 Summer Olympics.
