= Takafumi Matsuda =

Japanese cyclist (born 1951)

Personal information
- Born: 18 December 1951 (age 74)

Cycling career
- Sport: Cycling

Takafumi Matsuda (松田 隆文, Matsuda Takafumi; born 18 December 1951) is a former Japanese cyclist. He competed in the 1000m time trial event at the 1972 Summer Olympics. He was also a professional keirin cyclist.
