= Tang Xuezhong =

Chinese cyclist (born 1969)

Personal information
- Born: 31 March 1969 (age 57)

Cycling career
- Sport: Cycling

Tang Xuezhong (汤学忠, born 31 March 1969) is a Chinese former cyclist. He competed at the 1988 Summer Olympics and the 1992 Summer Olympics.
