= Kim Gwang-seon =

South Korean cyclist (born 1946)

Personal information
- Born: 8 April 1946 (age 80) Seoul, South Korea

Cycling career
- Sport: Cycling

- Kim Gwang-seon
- Hangul: 김광선
- Hanja: 金光善
- RR: Gim Gwangseon
- MR: Kim Kwangsŏn

Kim Gwang-seon (born 8 April 1946) is a former South Korean cyclist. He competed in the sprint and the 1000m time trial at the 1968 Summer Olympics.
