= Khosro Haghgosha =

Iranian cyclist (1948–2003)

Personal information
- Born: 5 January 1948 (age 78)
- Died: October 30, 2003 (aged 55) Tehran, Iran

Cycling career
- Sport: Cycling

Khosro Haghgosha (Persian: خسرو حق‌گشا, 5 January 1948 – 30 October 2003) was an Iranian former cyclist. He competed at the 1972 Summer Olympics and the 1976 Summer Olympics.
