= Kim Chul-seok =

South Korean cyclist (born 1960)

Personal information
- Born: 6 March 1960 (age 66)

Cycling career
- Sport: Cycling

Kim Chul-seok (Korean: 김철석; Hanja: 金鐵石; born 6 March 1960) is a South Korean former cyclist. He competed in the individual road race and the team time trial events at the 1984 Summer Olympics and 1986 Asian Games.
