= Hiroshi Toyooka =

Japanese cyclist

Personal information
- Born: 14 January 1969 (age 57) Sasebo, Nagasaki, Japan

Cycling career
- Sport: Cycling

Hiroshi Toyooka (豊岡 弘, Toyooka Hiroshi; born 14 January 1969) is a Japanese former cyclist. He competed in the 1 km time trial event at the 1988 Summer Olympics.
