= Park Min-soo (cyclist) =

South Korean cyclist (born 1970)

Personal information
- Born: 12 August 1970 (age 56)

Cycling career
- Sport: Cycling

- Park Min-soo
- Hangul: 박민수
- RR: Bak Minsu
- MR: Pak Minsu

Park Min-soo (born 12 August 1970) is a South Korean former cyclist. He competed at the 1988, 1992 and the 1996 Summer Olympics.
