= Chainarong Sophonpong =

Thai cyclist

Personal information
- Born: 1 February 1944 (age 82) Bangkok, Thailand

Cycling career
- Sport: Cycling
Medal record
Men's road bicycle racing
Representing Thailand
Southeast Asian Games
Gold medal – first place	1965 Kuala Lumpur	100 km road team trial

Chainarong Sophonpong (born 1 February 1944) is a former Thai cyclist.

He won the gold medal at the 1965 SEAP Games in Kuala Lumpur, Malaysia in the 100 km road team time trial.

He competed at the 1964 Summer Olympics and the 1968 Summer Olympics.
