= Jang Yun-ho =

South Korean cyclist

Personal information
- Born: 4 March 1961 (age 65)

Korean name
- Hangul: 장윤호
- Hanja: 張允虎
- RR: Jang Yunho
- MR: Chang Yunho

Sport
- Cycling career
- Sport: Cycling
- Current team: LX Cycling Team
- Discipline: Road
- Role: Rider (retired); Team manager

Managerial team
- 2017–: LX Cycling Team

Jang Yun-ho (Korean: 장윤호; born 4 March 1961) is a South Korean former cyclist, who currently works as the team manager for UCI Continental team LX Cycling Team. He competed in the team time trial event at the 1984 Summer Olympics.

His sons Jang Sun-jae and Jang Chan-jae are also cyclists.
