= Omar Haji Saad =

Malaysian cyclist

Personal information
- Born: 12 October 1949 (age 77)

Cycling career
- Sport: Cycling

Omar Haji Saad (born 12 October 1949) is a Malaysian former cyclist. He competed in the individual road race and team time trial events at the 1972 Summer Olympics.
