= Masamitsu Ehara =

Japanese cyclist (born 1969)

Personal information
- Born: 15 May 1969 (age 57) Osaka Prefecture, Japan

Cycling career
- Sport: Cycling

Masamitsu Ehara (江原 政光, Ehara Masamitsu; born 15 May 1969) is a Japanese former cyclist. He competed in two events at the 1992 Summer Olympics. He rode for Shimano during his career and won the mountains competition at the 1994 Tour de Hokkaido. He worked for the Shimano company after retiring.
