= Um Young-sup =

South Korean cyclist

Personal information
- Born: 10 July 1964 (age 62)

Cycling career
- Sport: Cycling

Um Young-sup (born 10 July 1964) is a South Korean former cyclist. He competed in two events at the 1988 Summer Olympics.
