= Preeda Chullamondhol =

Thai cyclist

Personal information
- Born: 21 August 1945
- Died: 28 March 2010 (aged 64)
- Height: 180 cm (5 ft 11 in)
- Weight: 72 kg (159 lb)

Cycling career
- Sport: Cycling

Preeda Chullamondhol (Thai: ปรีดา จุลละมณฑล; 21 August 1945 – 28 March 2010) was a Thai cyclist. He competed in the 1000m time trial and team pursuit events at the 1964 Summer Olympics.
