= Lee Jin-ok =

South Korean cyclist (born 1961)

Personal information
- Born: 18 November 1961 (age 64)

Cycling career
- Sport: Cycling

Lee Jin-ok (Korean: 이진옥; Hanja: 李鎭玉; born 18 November 1961) is a South Korean former cyclist. He competed at the 1984 Summer Olympics and the 1988 Summer Olympics and 1986 Asian Games.
