= Somchai Chantarasamrit =

Thai cyclist (born 1944)

Personal information
- Born: 1 November 1944 (age 81) Bangkok, Thailand

Cycling career
- Sport: Cycling

Somchai Chantarasamrit (born 1 November 1944) is a former Thai cyclist. He competed at the 1964 Summer Olympics and the 1968 Summer Olympics.
