= Wu Weipei =

Chinese cyclist

Personal information
- Full name: Wu Weipei
- Born: 4 March 1966 (age 60)

Cycling career
- Sport: Cycling
- Current team: China Liv Pro Cycling
- Discipline: Road
- Role: Rider (retired); Directeur sportif

Managerial teams
- 2006–: Giant Pro Cycling
- 2012–2019: Max Success Sports

Wu Weipei (born 4 March 1966) is a Chinese former cyclist. He competed in the team time trial at the 1988 Summer Olympics. Wu now works as a directeur sportif for UCI Women's Continental Team China Liv Pro Cycling. He formerly held the same role with men's UCI Continental team Giant Cycling Team, from 2012 to 2019.
