= Matsuyoshi Takahashi =

Japanese cyclist

Personal information
- Born: 3 September 1955 (age 71) Akita Prefecture, Japan

Cycling career
- Sport: Cycling

Matsuyoshi Takahashi (高橋 松吉, Takahashi Matsuyoshi; born 3 September 1955) is a Japanese former cyclist. He competed in the individual road race event at the 1984 Summer Olympics. He also competed at the 1982 and 1986 Asian Games. He served as one of the coaches for the Japanese cycling team at the 2012 Summer Olympics.
