= Cho Sung-hwan (cyclist) =

South Korean cyclist (born 1943)

Personal information
- Born: 7 February 1943 (age 83)
- Height: 169 cm (5 ft 7 in)
- Weight: 65 kg (143 lb)

Cycling career
- Sport: Cycling

Cho Sung-hwan (born 7 February 1943) is a former South Korean cyclist. He competed in the team time trial at the 1964 Summer Olympics.
