= South Korea at the 1970 Asian Games =

- IOC code: KOR
- NOC: Korean Olympic Committee

in Bangkok
- Competitors: 131 in 12 sports
- Flag bearer: Kim Yeong-Il
- Officials: 41
- Medals Ranked 2nd: Gold 18 Silver 13 Bronze 23 Total 54

Asian Games appearances (overview)
- 1954; 1958; 1962; 1966; 1970; 1974; 1978; 1982; 1986; 1990; 1994; 1998; 2002; 2006; 2010; 2014; 2018; 2022; 2026

South Korea (IOC designation:Korea) participated in the 1970 Asian Games held in Bangkok, Thailand from December 9, 1970 to December 20, 1970.

== Medal summary ==
=== Medal table ===
Sport	Gold	Silver	Bronze	Total
Boxing	6	1	2	9
Shooting	3	2	4	9
Weightlifting	2	1	3	6
Swimming	2	0	0	2
Cycling	1	4	4	9
Athletics	1	1	5	7
Diving	1	1	1	3
Basketball	1	0	0	1
Football	1	0	0	1
Volleyball	0	2	0	2
Wrestling	0	1	3	4
Badminton	0	0	1	1
Totals (12 entries)	18	13	23	54
