= Kwon Jung-hyun (cyclist) =

South Korean cyclist (born 1942)

Personal information
- Born: 29 July 1942 (age 84) South Korea

Cycling career
- Sport: Cycling

Kwon Jung-hyun (Korean: 권중현; Hanja: 權重鉉; born 29 July 1942) is a former South Korean cyclist. He competed in three events at the 1968 Summer Olympics.
