= Guo Longchen =

Chinese cyclist (born 1968)

Personal information
- Born: 12 January 1968 (age 58)

Cycling career
- Sport: Cycling

Guo Longchen (born 12 January 1968) is a Chinese former cyclist. He competed in the team time trial at the 1988 Summer Olympics.
