= 1970 Asian Games =

Multi-sport event in Bangkok, Thailand

VI Asian Games
- Host city: Bangkok, Thailand
- Motto: Ever Onward
- Nations: 18
- Athletes: 2,400
- Events: 135 in 13 sports
- Opening: 9 December 1970
- Closing: 20 December 1970
- Opened by: Bhumibol Adulyadej; King of Thailand
- Torch lighter: Preeda Chullamondhol
- Main venue: National Stadium
- Website: ocasia.org (archived)

The 6th Asian Games also known as Bangkok 1970, were held from 9 to 20 December 1970 in Bangkok, Thailand. Seoul, South Korea, had been selected to host the 6th Games but it declined due to both financial reasons and security threats from neighboring North Korea (the city eventually hosted in 1986). The previous host, Thailand, stepped in to save the Asiad. 2,400 athletes from 18 countries competed in this Asiad, where yachting made its debut.

== Venue ==
King Bhumibol Adulyadej opened the 6th Asian Games.

Release of 2,500 pigeons in the opening ceremony of the 6th Asian Games.

Indonesian athletes marched into the venue in the opening ceremony of the 6th Asian Games.

=== National Sport Complex ===
- Suphachalasai Stadium (Opening & Closing ceremonies, Athletics and Football)
- Chantanayingyong Gymnasium (Volleyball)
- Thephasadin Stadium (Hockey)
- Nimibutr Stadium (Basketball)
- Wisutarom Swimming Pool (Diving, Swimming)

=== Sport Authority of Thailand Sport Complex (Hua Mark) ===
- Indoor Stadium (formerly Kittikachorn Indoor Stadium) (Badminton and Boxing)
- Shooting Range (Shooting)
- Velodrome (Cycling)

=== Chulalongkorn University Sport Complex ===
- Chula Football Stadium (Football)
- Chula Swimming Stadium (Water Polo)

=== Thammasat University (Thaprachan Centre) ===
- Thammasat Gymnasium (Volleyball)

=== Other Venue in Bangkok ===
- Cultural Hall (Weightlifting)
- Amporn Garden Hall (Wrestling)

=== Pattaya (Outside Bangkok) ===
- Pattaya Bay (Sailing)

== Participating nations ==
- Burma (14)
- Ceylon (73)
- Hong Kong (106)
- India (177)
- Indonesia (95)
- Iran (102)
- Israel (53)
- Japan (427)
- Khmer Republic (8)
- Malaysia (100)
- Nepal (30)
- Pakistan (84)
- Philippines (302)
- Republic of China (161)
- Singapore (75)
- South Korea (102)
- South Vietnam (19)
- Thailand (472)

Non-competing nations

The following only sent non-competing delegations:

- Afghanistan
- Laos

Number of athletes by National Olympic Committees (by highest to lowest)

IOC Letter Code	Country	Athletes
THA	Thailand	472
JPN	Japan	427
PHI	Philippines	302
IND	India	177
ROC	Republic of China	161
HKG	Hong Kong	106
IRN	Iran	102
KOR	South Korea	102
MAL	Malaysia	100
INA	Indonesia	95
PAK	Pakistan	84
SIN	Singapore	75
CEY	Ceylon	73
ISR	Israel	53
NEP	Nepal	30
VNM	South Vietnam	19
BIR	Burma	14
KHM	Khmer Republic	8

== Sports ==
- Athletics (35)
- Badminton (7)
- Basketball (1)
- Boxing (11)
- Cycling (11)
- Diving (4)
- Field hockey (1)
- Football (1)
- Sailing (5)
- Shooting (14)
- Swimming (24)
- Volleyball (2)
- Water polo (1)
- Weightlifting (8)
- Wrestling (10)

== Calendar ==
In the following calendar for the 1970 Asian Games, each blue box represents an event competition, such as a qualification round, on that day. The yellow boxes represent days during which medal-awarding finals for a sport were held. The numeral indicates the number of event finals for each sport held that day. On the left, the calendar lists each sport with events held during the Games, and at the right, how many gold medals were won in that sport. There is a key at the top of the calendar to aid the reader.

OC	Opening ceremony	●	Event competitions	1	Event finals	CC	Closing ceremony

December 1970	9th Wed	10th Thu	11th Fri	12th Sat	13th Sun	14th Mon	15th Tue	16th Wed	17th Thu	18th Fri	19th Sat	20th Sun	Gold medals
Athletics		5	6	6	5	5	8						35
Badminton		●	●	●		2			●	●	5		7
Basketball		●	●	●		●	●	●		●	1		1
Boxing		●	●	●	●		11						11
Cycling – Road		1									2		3
Cycling – Track				1	1	2		●	4				8
Diving				1	1	1	1						4
Field hockey		●	●	●	●	●	●	●	●	●	1		1
Football		●	●	●	●	●	●	●	●	●	●	1	1
Sailing			●	●	●	●	●	5					5
Shooting		2	2		2		2	2		2	2		14
Swimming				6	5	5	4	4					24
Volleyball		●	●	●	●	●	●	●		●	2		2
Water polo				●	●	●	●	1					1
Weightlifting		1	1	1	1	1	1	1	1				8
Wrestling		●	●	●	10								10
Total gold medals		9	9	15	25	16	27	13	5	2	13	1	135
Ceremonies	OC											CC	
December 1970	9th Wed	10th Thu	11th Fri	12th Sat	13th Sun	14th Mon	15th Tue	16th Wed	17th Thu	18th Fri	19th Sat	20th Sun	Gold medals

== Medal table ==
The top ten ranked NOCs at these Games are listed below. The host nation, Thailand, is highlighted.

* Host nation (Thailand)

Rank	Nation	Gold	Silver	Bronze	Total
1	Japan (JPN)	74	47	23	144
2	South Korea (KOR)	18	13	23	54
3	Thailand (THA)*	9	17	13	39
4	Iran (IRN)	9	7	7	23
5	India (IND)	6	9	10	25
6	Israel (ISR)	6	6	5	17
7	Malaysia (MAL)	5	1	7	13
8	Burma (BIR)	3	2	7	12
9	Indonesia (INA)	2	5	13	20
10	Ceylon (CEY)	2	2	0	4
11–16	Remaining	3	24	45	72
Totals (16 entries)		137	133	153	423

Preceded by Bangkok	Asian Games; Bangkok; VI Asiad (1970)	Succeeded by Tehran
