= List of Asian Games medalists for Indonesia =

Sport

This is a list of Indonesian medalists at the Asian Games. For more information about Indonesian participation at the Asian Games, see Indonesia at the Asian Games.

== Medalists ==
Indonesia has recorded the greatest success in badminton, with only China having won more medals in the sport.

In 2018 as host, Indonesia won 98 medals with 31 gold medals. Indonesian athletes won 14 of the 16 gold medals contested in the sport of pencak silat at the 2018 Asian Games, in addition, Indonesia won the first Asian Games gold in the sports of jet skiing, mountain biking, paragliding, rowing, sepaktakraw, sport climbing, taekwondo, and weightlifting.

=== Archery ===
Medal	Name	Event	Games
Gold	Nurisa Dian Ashrifah	Women's individual compound	2026 Asian Games
Silver	Tatang Ferry Budiman; Suradi Rukimin; Donald Pandiangan	Men's team recurve	1982 Asian Games
Silver	Purnama Pandiangan; Rusena Gelanteh; Dahliana	Women's team recurve	1994 Asian Games
Silver	Diananda Choirunisa	Women's individual recurve	2018 Asian Games
Bronze	Donald Pandiangan; Adjidji Adang; Siddak Jubadjati	Men's team recurve	1978 Asian Games
Bronze	Riau Ega Agata Salsabilla	Men's individual recurve	2018 Asian Games
Bronze	Riau Ega Agata Salsabilla; Diananda Choirunisa	Mixed team recurve	2022 Asian Games
Bronze	Riau Ega Agata Salsabilla; Arif Dwi Pangestu; Ahmad Khoirul Baasith	Men's team recurve	2022 Asian Games

=== Athletics ===
Medal	Name	Event	Games
Gold	Mohammad Sarengat	Men's 100 m	1962 Asian Games
Gold	Mohammad Sarengat	Men's 110 m hurdles	1962 Asian Games
Gold	Supriyati Sutono	Women's 5000 m	1998 Asian Games
Gold	Maria Natalia Londa	Women's long jump	2014 Asian Games
Silver	Sugiri; Supardi; Wahjudi; Jootje Oroh	Men's 4 × 100 m relay	1966 Asian Games
Silver	Emilia Nova	Women's 100 metres hurdles	2018 Asian Games
Silver	Mohammad Fadlin; Lalu Muhammad Zohri; Eko Rimbawan; Bayu Kertanegara	Men's 4×100 m relay	2018 Asian Games
Bronze	Maram Sudarmodjo	Men's high jump	1951 Asian Games
Bronze	AF Matulessy	Men's javelin throw	1951 Asian Games
Bronze	Hendarsin Hendamihardja	Men's triple jump	1951 Asian Games
Bronze	Triwulan; Darwati; Lie Djian Nio; Surjowati	Women's 4×100 m relay	1951 Asian Games
Bronze	Annie Salamun	Women's discus throw	1951 Asian Games
Bronze	Karnah Soekarta	Women's javelin throw	1958 Asian Games
Bronze	Mohammad Sarengat	Men's 200 m	1962 Asian Games
Bronze	Gurnam Singh	Men's 10000 m	1962 Asian Games
Bronze	Awang Papilaja	Men's long jump	1962 Asian Games
Bronze	Awang Papilaja	Men's high jump	1962 Asian Games
Bronze	Soeratmi; Ernawati; Tomasoa; Wiewiek Machwijar	Women's 4×100 m relay	1962 Asian Games
Bronze	Soeatini	Women's 800 m	1962 Asian Games
Bronze	Carolina Rieuwpassa	Women's 100 m	1970 Asian Games
Bronze	Carolina Rieuwpassa	Women's 200 m	1970 Asian Games
Bronze	Sapwaturrahman	Men's long jump	2018 Asian Games

=== Badminton ===
Medal	Name	Event	Games
Gold	Tan Joe Hok	Men's singles	1962 Asian Games
Gold	Minarni	Women's singles	1962 Asian Games
Gold	Retno Kustijah; Minarni	Women's doubles	1962 Asian Games
Gold	Men's team: Tutang Djamaluddin; Liem Tjeng Kiang; Ferry Sonneville; Tan Joe Hok; Abdul Patah Unang	Men's team	1962 Asian Games
Gold	Women's team: Goei Kiok Nio; Happy Herowati; Corry Kawilarang; Retno Kustijah; Minarni	Women's team	1962 Asian Games
Gold	Muljadi	Men's singles	1966 Asian Games
Gold	Retno Kustijah; Minarni	Women's doubles	1966 Asian Games
Gold	Men's team: Indra Gunawan; Rudy Hartono; Indratno; Mintarja; Muljadi	Men's team	1970 Asian Games
Gold	Tjun Tjun; Johan Wahjudi	Men's doubles	1974 Asian Games
Gold	Christian Hadinata; Regina Masli	Mixed doubles	1974 Asian Games
Gold	Liem Swie King	Men's singles	1978 Asian Games
Gold	Christian Hadinata; Ade Chandra	Men's doubles	1978 Asian Games
Gold	Imelda Wiguna; Verawaty Wiharjo	Women's doubles	1978 Asian Games
Gold	Men's team: Ade Chandra; Christian Hadinata; Rudy Heryanto; Hariamanto Kartono; Liem Swie King; Iie Sumirat	Men's team	1978 Asian Games
Gold	Christian Hadinata; Icuk Sugiarto	Men's doubles	1982 Asian Games
Gold	Christian Hadinata; Ivana Lie	Mixed doubles	1982 Asian Games
Gold	Hariyanto Arbi	Men's singles	1994 Asian Games
Gold	Rexy Mainaky; Ricky Subagja	Men's doubles	1994 Asian Games
Gold	Men's team: Hariyanto Arbi; Rudy Gunawan; Rexy Mainaky; Ricky Subagja; Bambang Suprianto; Joko Suprianto; Hermawan Susanto; Ardy Wiranata	Men's team	1994 Asian Games
Gold	Rexy Mainaky; Ricky Subagja	Men's doubles	1998 Asian Games
Gold	Men's team: Tony Gunawan; Hendrawan; Taufik Hidayat; Tri Kusharjanto; Rexy Mainaky; Budi Santoso; Ricky Subagja; Candra Wijaya	Men's team	1998 Asian Games
Gold	Taufik Hidayat	Men's singles	2002 Asian Games
Gold	Taufik Hidayat	Men's singles	2006 Asian Games
Gold	Markis Kido; Hendra Setiawan	Men's doubles	2010 Asian Games
Gold	Mohammad Ahsan; Hendra Setiawan	Men's doubles	2014 Asian Games
Gold	Greysia Polii; Nitya Krishinda Maheswari	Women's doubles	2014 Asian Games
Gold	Jonatan Christie	Men's singles	2018 Asian Games
Gold	Marcus Fernaldi Gideon; Kevin Sanjaya Sukamuljo	Men's doubles	2018 Asian Games
Gold	Men's team: Jonatan Christie; Alwi Farhan; Zaki Ubaidillah; Muhamad Yusuf; Fajar Alfian; Muhammad Shohibul Fikri; Leo Rolly Carnando; Daniel Marthin; Nikolaus Joaquin; Amri Syahnawi	Men's team	2026 Asian Games
Gold	Leo Rolly Carnando; Daniel Marthin	Men's doubles	2026 Asian Games
Silver	Corry Kawilarang	Women's singles	1962 Asian Games
Silver	Tan Joe Hok; Liem Tjeng Kiang	Men's doubles	1962 Asian Games
Silver	Corry Kawilarang; Happy Herowati	Women's doubles	1962 Asian Games
Silver	Wong Pek Sen	Men's singles	1966 Asian Games
Silver	Boan Tjoa Tjong; Muljadi	Men's doubles	1966 Asian Games
Silver	Muljadi	Men's singles	1970 Asian Games
Silver	Nurhaena; Retno Kustijah	Women's doubles	1970 Asian Games
Silver	Christian Hadinata; Ade Chandra	Men's doubles	1974 Asian Games
Silver	Tjun Tjun; Sri Wiyanti	Mixed doubles	1974 Asian Games
Silver	Men's team: Ade Chandra; Christian Hadinata; Liem Swie King; Nunung Murdjianto; Tjun Tjun; Johan Wahjudi	Men's team	1974 Asian Games
Silver	Women's team: Regina Masli; Minarni; Taty Sumirah; Theresia Widiastuti; Imelda Wiguna; Sri Wiyanti	Women's team	1974 Asian Games
Silver	Hariamanto Kartono; Theresia Widiastuti	Mixed doubles	1978 Asian Games
Silver	Women's team: Ruth Damayanti; Ivana Lie; Tjan So Gwan; Theresia Widiastuti; Imelda Wiguna; Verawaty Wiharjo	Women's team	1978 Asian Games
Silver	Liem Swie King	Men's singles	1982 Asian Games
Silver	Icuk Sugiarto; Ruth Damayanti	Mixed doubles	1982 Asian Games
Silver	Men's team: Christian Hadinata; Wirawan Hadiyanto; Rudy Heryanto; Hariamanto Kartono; Liem Swie King; Icuk Sugiarto	Men's team	1982 Asian Games
Silver	Eddy Hartono; Verawaty Fadjrin	Mixed doubles	1990 Asian Games
Silver	Women's team: Verawaty Fadjrin; Sarwendah Kusumawardhani; Lilik Sudarwati; Erma Sulistianingsih; Susi Susanti; Lili Tampi; Rosiana Tendean; Minarti Timur	Women's team	1990 Asian Games
Silver	Joko Suprianto	Men's singles	1994 Asian Games
Silver	Women's team: Finarsih; Yuni Kartika; Eliza Nathanael; Ika Heny Nursanti; Zelin Resiana; Yuliani Santosa; Susi Susanti; Lili Tampi	Women's team	1994 Asian Games
Silver	Hendrawan	Men's singles	1998 Asian Games
Silver	Eliza Nathanael; Deyana Lomban	Women's doubles	1998 Asian Games
Silver	Men's team: Rony Agustinus; Sigit Budiarto; Halim Haryanto; Hendrawan; Taufik Hidayat; Tri Kusharjanto; Marleve Mainaky; Bambang Suprianto; Nova Widianto; Candra Wijaya	Men's team	2002 Asian Games
Silver	Alvent Yulianto; Luluk Hadiyanto	Men's doubles	2006 Asian Games
Silver	Tontowi Ahmad; Liliyana Natsir	Mixed doubles	2014 Asian Games
Silver	Men's team: Anthony Sinisuka Ginting; Fajar Alfian; Ihsan Maulana Mustofa; Jonatan Christie; Kevin Sanjaya Sukamuljo; Marcus Fernaldi Gideon; Mohammad Ahsan; Muhammad Rian Ardianto; Ricky Karanda Suwardi; Tontowi Ahmad	Men's team	2018 Asian Games
Silver	Fajar Alfian; Muhammad Rian Ardianto	Men's doubles	2018 Asian Games
Silver	Amri Syahnawi; Nita Violina Marwah	Mixed doubles	2026 Asian Games
Bronze	Ferry Sonneville	Men's singles	1962 Asian Games
Bronze	Happy Herowati	Women's singles	1962 Asian Games
Bronze	Tutang Djamaludin; Abdul Patah Unang	Men's doubles	1962 Asian Games
Bronze	Minarni	Women's singles	1966 Asian Games
Bronze	Tan King Gwan; Abdul Patah Unang	Men's doubles	1966 Asian Games
Bronze	Muljadi; Retno Kustijah	Mixed doubles	1966 Asian Games
Bronze	Wong Pek Sen; Minarni	Mixed doubles	1966 Asian Games
Bronze	Women's team: Retno Kustijah; Minarni; Nurhaena; Tan Tjoen Ing	Women's team	1966 Asian Games
Bronze	Minarni	Women's singles	1970 Asian Games
Bronze	Rudy Hartono; Indra Gunawan	Men's doubles	1970 Asian Games
Bronze	Rudy Hartono; Minarni	Mixed doubles	1970 Asian Games
Bronze	Women's team: Utami Kinard; Retno Kustijah; Minarni; Nurhaena; Poppy Tumengkol; Theresia Widiastuti	Women's team	1970 Asian Games
Bronze	Liem Swie King	Men's singles	1974 Asian Games
Bronze	Theresia Widiastuti; Imelda Wiguna	Women's doubles	1974 Asian Games
Bronze	Iie Sumirat	Men's singles	1978 Asian Games
Bronze	Theresia Widiastuti; Ruth Damayanti	Women's doubles	1978 Asian Games
Bronze	Christian Hadinata; Imelda Wiguna	Mixed doubles	1978 Asian Games
Bronze	Liem Swie King; Bobby Ertanto	Men's doubles	1986 Asian Games
Bronze	Rosiana Tendean; Imelda Wiguna	Women's doubles	1986 Asian Games
Bronze	Men's team: Bobby Ertanto; Christian Hadinata; Eddy Hartono; Eddy Kurniawan; Liem Swie King; Lius Pongoh; Icuk Sugiarto; Hadibowo Susanto	Men's team	1986 Asian Games
Bronze	Women's team: Verawaty Fadjrin; Sarwendah Kusumawardhani; Elizabeth Latief; Ivana Lie; Rosiana Tendean; Imelda Wiguna	Women's team	1986 Asian Games
Bronze	Alan Budikusuma	Men's singles	1990 Asian Games
Bronze	Susi Susanti	Women's singles	1990 Asian Games
Bronze	Eddy Hartono; Rudy Gunawan	Men's doubles	1990 Asian Games
Bronze	Verawaty Fajrin; Lili Tampi	Women's doubles	1990 Asian Games
Bronze	Rudy Gunawan; Rosiana Tendean	Mixed doubles	1990 Asian Games
Bronze	Men's team: Alan Budikusuma; Rudy Gunawan; Eddy Hartono; Richard Mainaky; Aryono Miranat; Joko Suprianto; Hermawan Susanto; Ardy Wiranata	Men's team	1990 Asian Games
Bronze	Susi Susanti	Women's singles	1994 Asian Games
Bronze	Rudy Gunawan; Eliza Nathanael	Mixed doubles	1994 Asian Games
Bronze	Tri Kusharjanto; Minarti Timur	Mixed doubles	1998 Asian Games
Bronze	Women's team: Mia Audina; Carmelita; Cindana Hartono Kusuma; Indarti Isolina; Deyana Lomban; Meiluawati; Eliza Nathanael; Minarti Timur	Women's team	1998 Asian Games
Bronze	Hendrawan	Men's singles	2002 Asian Games
Bronze	Halim Haryanto; Tri Kusharjanto	Men's doubles	2002 Asian Games
Bronze	Nova Widianto; Vita Marissa	Mixed doubles	2002 Asian Games
Bronze	Markis Kido; Hendra Setiawan	Men's doubles	2006 Asian Games
Bronze	Men's team: Luluk Hadiyanto; Taufik Hidayat; Markis Kido; Sony Dwi Kuncoro; Simon Santoso; Hendra Setiawan; Nova Widianto; Alvent Yulianto	Men's team	2006 Asian Games
Bronze	Alvent Yulianto; Mohammad Ahsan	Men's doubles	2010 Asian Games
Bronze	Men's team: Tontowi Ahmad; Mohammad Ahsan; Taufik Hidayat; Markis Kido; Sony Dwi Kuncoro; Fran Kurniawan; Dionysius Hayom Rumbaka; Simon Santoso; Hendra Setiawan; Alvent Yulianto	Men's team	2010 Asian Games
Bronze	Women's team: Pia Zebadiah Bernadet; Lindaweni Fanetri; Adriyanti Firdasari; Shendy Puspa Irawati; Meiliana Jauhari; Maria Febe Kusumastuti; Nitya Krishinda Maheswari; Liliyana Natsir; Greysia Polii; Aprilia Yuswandari	Women's team	2010 Asian Games
Bronze	Praveen Jordan; Debby Susanto	Mixed doubles	2014 Asian Games
Bronze	Women's team: Apriyani Rahayu; Debby Susanto; Della Destiara Haris; Fitriani; Gregoria Mariska Tunjung; Greysia Polii; Liliyana Natsir; Ni Ketut Mahadewi Istarani; Rizki Amelia Pradipta; Ruselli Hartawan	Women's team	2018 Asian Games
Bronze	Liliyana Natsir; Tontowi Ahmad	Mixed doubles	2018 Asian Games
Bronze	Greysia Polii; Apriyani Rahayu	Women's doubles	2018 Asian Games
Bronze	Anthony Sinisuka Ginting	Men's singles	2018 Asian Games
Bronze	Women's team: Putri Kusuma Wardani; Thalita Ramadhani Wiryawan; Mutiara Ayu Puspitasari; Ni Kadek Dhinda Amartya Pratiwi; Rachel Allessya Rose; Febi Setianingrum; Febriana Dwipuji Kusuma; Meilysa Trias Puspita Sari; Siti Fadia Silva Ramadhanti; Nita Violina Marwah	Women's team	2026 Asian Games
Bronze	Fajar Alfian; Muhammad Shohibul Fikri	Men's doubles	2026 Asian Games
Bronze	Alwi Farhan	Men's singles	2026 Asian Games

=== Beach volleyball ===
Medal	Name	Event	Games
Silver	Agus Salim; Irilkhun Shofanna	Men's beach volleyball	1998 Asian Games
Silver	Agus Salim; Koko Prasetyo Darkuncoro	Men's beach volleyball	2002 Asian Games
Silver	Ade Candra Rachmawan; Mohammad Ashfiya	Men's beach volleyball	2018 Asian Games
Silver	Sofyan Rachman Efendi; Bintang Akbar	Men's beach volleyball	2026 Asian Games
Bronze	Iwan Sumoyo; Anjas Menasmara	Men's beach volleyball	1998 Asian Games
Bronze	Agus Salim; Supriadi	Men's beach volleyball	2006 Asian Games
Bronze	Gilang Ramadhan; Danangsyah Yudistira Pribadi	Men's beach volleyball	2018 Asian Games
Bronze	Dhita Juliana; Putu Dini Jasita Utami	Women's beach volleyball	2018 Asian Games

=== Bodybuilding ===
Medal	Name	Event	Games
Silver	Wimpi Wungow	Men's +90 kg	2002 Asian Games
Silver	Syafrizaldy	Men's -70 kg	2006 Asian Games

=== Bowling ===
Medal	Name	Event	Games
Gold	Ryan Leonard Lalisang	Men's singles	2006 Asian Games
Silver	Hendro Pratono	Men's singles	1994 Asian Games
Silver	Putty Armein	Women's singles	2006 Asian Games
Silver	Putty Armein; Ivana Hie; Novie Phang; Sharon Santoso; Tannya Roumimper; Shalima Zalsha	Women's team of Five	2010 Asian Games
Bronze	Sri Mulyani Ruzgar; Fenny Tjahjo; Charlotte Sjamsuddin	Women's Trios	1986 Asian Games
Bronze	Poppy Marijke Tambis	Women's all events	1986 Asian Games
Bronze	Hardy Rachmadian; Billy Muhammad Islam	Men's doubles	2014 Asian Games
Bronze	Nabila Alisha; Putty Armein; Chantika Cheya; Novie Phang; Sharon Santoso; Tannya Roumimper	Women's team of Five	2014 Asian Games

=== Boxing ===
Medal	Name	Event	Games
Gold	Wiem Gommies	Men's Middleweight	1970 Asian Games
Gold	Wiem Gommies	Men's Middleweight	1978 Asian Games
Gold	Pino Bahari	Men's Middleweight	1990 Asian Games
Silver	Frans Soplanit	Men's Bantamweight	1962 Asian Games
Silver	Paruhum Siregar	Men's Light Heavyweight	1962 Asian Games
Silver	Idwan Anwar	Men's Flyweight	1966 Asian Games
Silver	Said Fidal	Men's Light Welterweight	1966 Asian Games
Silver	Johnny Riberu	Men's Flyweight	1978 Asian Games
Silver	Adrianus Taroreh	Men's Featherweight	1986 Asian Games
Silver	Hermensen Ballo	Men's Flyweight	1998 Asian Games
Silver	Willem Papilaya	Men's Light Welterweight	1998 Asian Games
Bronze	Johnny Bolang	Men's Light Welterweight	1962 Asian Games
Bronze	Alex Abast	Men's Middleweight	1962 Asian Games
Bronze	Ferry Moniaga	Men's Flyweight	1970 Asian Games
Bronze	Idwan Anwar	Men's Bantamweight	1970 Asian Games
Bronze	Jootje Waney	Men's Lightweight	1970 Asian Games
Bronze	Rudi Siregar	Men's Light Heavyweight	1970 Asian Games
Bronze	Frans van Bronckhorst	Men's Welterweight	1974 Asian Games
Bronze	Benny Maniani	Men's Light Heavyweight	1978 Asian Games
Bronze	Krismanto	Men's Heavyweight	1978 Asian Games
Bronze	Franky Mamuaya	Men's Bantamweight	1990 Asian Games
Bronze	Hendrik Simangunsong	Men's Light Middleweight	1990 Asian Games
Bronze	Hermansen Ballo	Men's Light Flyweight	1994 Asian Games
Bronze	Nemo Bahari	Men's Featherweight	1994 Asian Games
Bronze	Huswatun Hasanah	Women's Lightweight	2018 Asian Games
Bronze	Sunan Agung Amoragam	Men's Bantamweight	2018 Asian Games

=== Canoeing – Sprint ===
Medal	Name	Event	Games
Silver	Anisi	Men's kayak singles 1000 m	1990 Asian Games
Silver	Absir; Laode Hadi; Lampada; Sayadin	Men's Kayak Four 1000 m	1998 Asian Games
Silver	Riska Andriyani	Women's canoe singles 200 m	2018 Asian Games
Bronze	Anisi; Abdul Razak	Men's kayak doubles 1000 m	1990 Asian Games
Bronze	Riska Andriyani; Nur Meni	Women's canoe doubles 500 m	2018 Asian Games
Bronze	Herlin Aprilin Lali	Women's C-1 200 m	2026 Asian Games

=== Contract Bridge ===
Medal	Name	Event	Games
Bronze	Bill Roland George Mondigir; Julita Grace Joice Tueje; Lusje Olha Bojoh; Marcella Elvitta Chyntia Lasut; Raufik Gautama Asbi; Robert Parasian	Mixed Team	2018 Asian Games
Bronze	Michael Bambang Hartono; Bert Toar Polii; Conny Eufke Sumampouw; Franky Steven Karwur; Jemmy Boyke Bojoh; Rury Andhani	Supermixed Team	2018 Asian Games
Bronze	Henky Lasut; Freddy Eddy Manoppo	Men's Pair	2018 Asian Games
Bronze	Lusje Olha Bojoh; Taufik Gautama Asbi	Mixed Pair	2018 Asian Games

=== Cue Sports ===
Medal	Name	Event	Games
Bronze	Irsal Nasution	Men's 8-ball singles	2010 Asian Games

=== Cycling – Road ===
Medal	Name	Event	Games
Gold	Hendrik Brocks	Men's open road race	1962 Asian Games
Gold	Men's team: Hendrik Brocks; Aming Priatna; Wahju Wahdini	Men's road race team	1962 Asian Games
Gold	Men's team: Hendrik Brocks; Aming Priatna; Hasjim Roesli; Wahju Wahdini	Men's time trial team	1962 Asian Games
Silver	Fanny Gunawan	Men's individual road race	1986 Asian Games
Silver	Uyun Muzizah	Women's individual road race	2002 Asian Games
Silver	Santia Tri Kusuma	Women's individual road race	2010 Asian Games
Bronze	Aming Priatna	Men's open road race	1962 Asian Games

=== Cycling - BMX ===
Medal	Name	Event	Games
Gold	Amellya Nur Sifa	Women's BMX racing	2022 Asian Games
Silver	I Gusti Bagus Saputra	Men's BMX racing	2018 Asian Games
Bronze	Wiji Lestari	Women's BMX racing	2018 Asian Games
Bronze	Jasmine Azzahra Setyobudi	Women's BMX racing	2022 Asian Games
Bronze	Jasmine Azzahra Setyobudi	Women's BMX racing	2026 Asian Games

=== Cycling – Mountain Bike ===
Medal	Name	Event	Games
Gold	Khoiful Mukhib	Men's downhill	2018 Asian Games
Gold	Tiara Andini Prastika	Women's downhill	2018 Asian Games
Bronze	Risa Suseanty	Women's downhill	2002 Asian Games
Bronze	Nining Porwaningsih	Women's downhill	2018 Asian Games
Bronze	Feri Yudoyono	Men's cross-country	2026 Asian Games
Bronze	Sayu Bella Sukma Dewi	Women's cross-country	2026 Asian Games

=== Cycling – Track ===
Medal	Name	Event	Games
Silver	Uyun Muzizah	Women's 3000m individual pursuit	2002 Asian Games
Bronze	Nurhayati	Women's 1 km time trial	1990 Asian Games
Bronze	Santia Tri Kusuma	Women's points race	2002 Asian Games

=== Diving ===
Medal	Name	Event	Games
Gold	Lanny Gumulya	Women's 3m Springboard	1962 Asian Games
Silver	Billy Gumulya	Men's 3m Springboard	1970 Asian Games
Bronze	Billy Gumulya	Men's 3m Springboard	1962 Asian Games
Bronze	Lanny Gumulya	Women's 10m Platform	1962 Asian Games
Bronze	Billy Gumulya	Men's 3m Springboard	1966 Asian Games
Bronze	Mirnawati Hardjolukito	Women's 3m Springboard	1970 Asian Games

=== Dragon boat ===
Medal	Name	Event	Games
Gold	Men's team: Abdul Azis; Ajurahman; Alkarmani; Arifriyadi; Asep Hidayat; Asnawir; Iwan Husin; Jaslin; Marjuki; Jhon Matulessy; Spens Stuber Mehue; Erwin Monim; Muchlis; Eka Octarianus; Pendrota Putra Kusuma; Ikhwan Randi; Didin Rusdiana; Silo; Japerry Siregar; Andri Sugiarto; Ahmad Supriadi; Dedi Kurniawan Suyatno; Syarifuddin; Anwar Tarra	Men's 1000 metres	2010 Asian Games
Gold	Men's team: Abdul Azis; Ajurahman; Alkarmani; Arifriyadi; Asep Hidayat; Asnawir; Iwan Husin; Jaslin; Marjuki; Jhon Matulessy; Spens Stuber Mehue; Erwin Monim; Muchlis; Eka Octarianus; Pendrota Putra Kusuma; Ikhwan Randi; Didin Rusdiana; Silo; Japerry Siregar; Andri Sugiarto; Ahmad Supriadi; Dedi Kurniawan Suyatno; Syarifuddin; Anwar Tarra	Men's 500 metres	2010 Asian Games
Gold	Men's team: Abdul Azis; Ajurahman; Alkarmani; Arifriyadi; Asep Hidayat; Asnawir; Iwan Husin; Jaslin; Marjuki; Jhon Matulessy; Spens Stuber Mehue; Erwin Monim; Muchlis; Eka Octarianus; Pendrota Putra Kusuma; Ikhwan Randi; Didin Rusdiana; Silo; Japerry Siregar; Andri Sugiarto; Ahmad Supriadi; Dedi Kurniawan Suyatno; Syarifuddin; Anwar Tarra	Men's 250 metres	2010 Asian Games
Gold	Men's team: Dedi Saputra; Andri Agus Mulyana; Harjuna; Tri Wahyu Buwono; Yuda Firmansyah; Indra Tri Setiawan; Joko Andriyanto; Maizir Riyondra; Mugi Harjito; Muh Burhan; Sutrisno; Sofiyanto; Angga Suwandi Putra; Zubakri	Men's 1000 metres	2022 Asian Games
Silver	Women's team: Wina Apriani; Sarce Aronggear; Fitri Ayu; Dayumin; Astri Dwijayanti; Yulanda Ester Entong; Farida; Raudani Fitra; Hasnah; Tika Inderiyani; Yunita Kadop; Masripah; Minawati; Ririn Nurparida; Cici Pramita; Royani Rais; Riska Elpia Ramadani; Rasima; Salwiah; Kanti Santyawati; Novita Sari; Suhartati; Wahyuni; Since Litashova Yom	Women's 1000 metres	2010 Asian Games
Silver	Women's team: Wina Apriani; Sarce Aronggear; Fitri Ayu; Dayumin; Astri Dwijayanti; Yulanda Ester Entong; Farida; Raudani Fitra; Hasnah; Tika Inderiyani; Yunita Kadop; Masripah; Minawati; Ririn Nurparida; Cici Pramita; Royani Rais; Riska Elpia Ramadani; Rasima; Salwiah; Kanti Santyawati; Novita Sari; Suhartati; Wahyuni; Since Litashova Yom	Women's 500 metres	2010 Asian Games
Silver	Women's team: Wina Apriani; Sarce Aronggear; Fitri Ayu; Dayumin; Astri Dwijayanti; Yulanda Ester Entong; Farida; Raudani Fitra; Hasnah; Tika Inderiyani; Yunita Kadop; Masripah; Minawati; Ririn Nurparida; Cici Pramita; Royani Rais; Riska Elpia Ramadani; Rasima; Salwiah; Kanti Santyawati; Novita Sari; Suhartati; Wahyuni; Since Litashova Yom	Women's 250 metres	2010 Asian Games
Silver	Women's team: Risti Ardianti; Ririn Puji Astuti; Aswiati; Emiliana Deau; Astri Dwijayanti; Raudani Fitra; Selvianti Hidayat; Stevani Ibo; Christina Kafolakari; Shifa Karim; Masripah; Alvonsina Monim; Fazriah Nurbayan; Ramla B; Since Yom; Riana Yulistrian	Women's 200 metres	2018 Asian Games
Silver	Men's team: Rio Akbar; Arpan; Muhammad Faturahman; Yuda Firmansyah; Medi Juana; Marjuki; Spens Mehue; Erwin Monim; Andri Mulyana; Poliyansyah; Muhammad Rustandi; Dedi Saputra; Syahrul Saputra; Sutrisno; Anwar Tarra; Mochamad Taufan Wijaya	Men's 1000 metres	2018 Asian Games
Silver	Women's team: Ayuning Tika Vihari; Anisa Yulistiawan; Fazriah Nurbayan; Cinta Priendtisca Nayomi; Dayumin; Raudani Fitra; Iin Rosiana Damiri; Maryati; Sella Monim; Nadia Hafiza; Ramla Baharuddin; Ratih; Reski Wahyuni; Ester Yustince Daimoi	Women's 200 metres	2022 Asian Games
Silver	Men's team: Dedi Saputra; Andri Agus Mulyana; Harjuna; Tri Wahyu Buwono; Yuda Firmansyah; Indra Tri Setiawan; Joko Andriyanto; Maizir Riyondra; Mugi Harjito; Muh Burhan; Sutrisno; Sofiyanto; Angga Suwandi Putra; Zubakri	Men's 500 metres	2022 Asian Games
Silver	Women's team: Ayuning Tika Vihari; Anisa Yulistiawan; Fazriah Nurbayan; Cinta Priendtisca Nayomi; Dayumin; Raudani Fitra; Iin Rosiana Damiri; Maryati; Sella Monim; Nadia Hafiza; Ramla Baharuddin; Ratih; Reski Wahyuni; Ester Yustince Daimoi	Women's 500 metres	2022 Asian Games
Silver	Women's team: Ayuning Tika Vihari; Anisa Yulistiawan; Fazriah Nurbayan; Cinta Priendtisca Nayomi; Dayumin; Raudani Fitra; Iin Rosiana Damiri; Maryati; Sella Monim; Nadia Hafiza; Ramla Baharuddin; Ratih; Reski Wahyuni; Ester Yustince Daimoi	Women's 1000 metres	2022 Asian Games
Bronze	Men's team: Rio Akbar; Arpan; Muhammad Faturahman; Yuda Firmansyah; Medi Juana; Marjuki; Spens Mehue; Erwin Monim; Andri Mulyana; Poliyansyah; Muhammad Rustandi; Dedi Saputra; Syahrul Saputra; Sutrisno; Anwar Tarra; Mochamad Taufan Wijaya	Men's 500 metres	2018 Asian Games
Bronze	Men's team: Dedi Saputra; Andri Agus Mulyana; Harjuna; Tri Wahyu Buwono; Yuda Firmansyah; Indra Tri Setiawan; Joko Andriyanto; Maizir Riyondra; Mugi Harjito; Muh Burhan; Sutrisno; Sofiyanto; Angga Suwandi Putra; Zubakri	Men's 200 metres	2022 Asian Games

=== Equestrian ===
Medal	Name	Event	Games
Bronze	Larasati Gading	Individual dressage	2014 Asian Games

=== Esports ===
Medal	Name	Event	Games
Silver	Deni Ardiyanto; Novrizal Diananta Said; Marcello Hillers; GM Judha Raja Panggabean; Muhammad Haikal Irawan	Pokémon Unite	2026 Asian Games
Silver	Alexander Owen Marcetami Buhe; Albert Neilsen Iskandar; Arif Fudin Dingarai Putra; Dalvin Ramadhana Putra; Syauki Fauzan Sumarno; A Muhammad Affan Wahyudi	Mobile Legends: Bang Bang	2026 Asian Games

=== Fencing ===
Medal	Name	Event	Games
Silver	Silvia Koeswandi	Women's individual épée	1990 Asian Games
Bronze	Women's team: Rita Piri Hehanusa; Wahyu Hertati; Silvia Koeswandi; Slamet Poerawinata	Women's team	1978 Asian Games
Bronze	Silvia Koeswandi; Rini Poniman; Sri Ayanti Satimin; Sumiani	Women's team épée	1990 Asian Games

=== Football ===
Medal	Name	Event	Games
Bronze	Men's team: Bakir; Fattah Hidayat; Muhammad Ilyas; Kurnia; Kwee Kiat Sek; Mardjoso; Paidjo; Phwa Sian Liong; Ramang; Muhammad Rasjid; Saari; Maulwi Saelan; Rukma Sudjana; Wowo Sunaryo; Omo Suratmo; Suryadi; Tan Liong Houw; Thio Him Tjiang; Henky Timisela	Men's team	1958 Asian Games

=== Gymnastics – Artistic ===
Medal	Name	Event	Games
Silver	Rifda Irfanaluthfi	Women's floor	2018 Asian Games
Bronze	Agus Adi Prayoko	Men's vault	2018 Asian Games

=== Jet ski ===
Medal	Name	Event	Games
Gold	Aqsa Sutan Aswar	Men's endurance runabout open	2018 Asian Games
Silver	Aero Sutan Aswar	Runabout limited	2018 Asian Games
Bronze	Aqsa Sutan Aswar	Runabout limited	2018 Asian Games

=== Judo ===
Medal	Name	Event	Games
Bronze	Pujawati Utama	Women's -72 kg	1990 Asian Games

=== Karate ===
Medal	Name	Event	Games
Gold	Arif Taufan Syamsuddin	Men's Kumite -60 kg	1998 Asian Games
Gold	Hasan Basri	Men's Kumite -65 kg	2002 Asian Games
Gold	Rifki Ardiansyah Arrosyiid	Men's kumite 60 kg	2018 Asian Games
Silver	Abdullah Kadir	Men's Kata Individual	1994 Asian Games
Silver	Omita Olga Ompi	Women's Kata Individual	1994 Asian Games
Silver	Meity Kaseger	Women's Kumite +60 kg	1994 Asian Games
Silver	Omita Olga Ompi	Women's Kata Individual	1998 Asian Games
Silver	Sandra Aryani	Women's Kumite -53 kg	1998 Asian Games
Silver	Umar Syarief	Men's Kumite +84 kg	2010 Asian Games
Silver	Fidelys Lolobua	Men's Kata Individual	2014 Asian Games
Bronze	Nurosi Nurasjati	Women's Kumite -53 kg	1994 Asian Games
Bronze	Nilawati Daud	Women's Kumite -53 kg	1994 Asian Games
Bronze	Abdullah Kadir	Men's Kata Individual	1998 Asian Games
Bronze	Isfan Tanjung	Men's Kumite -55 kg	1998 Asian Games
Bronze	Nilawati Daud	Women's Kumite -53 kg	1998 Asian Games
Bronze	Bambang Maulidin	Men's Kumite -55 kg	2002 Asian Games
Bronze	Umar Syarief	Men's Kumite +80 kg	2006 Asian Games
Bronze	Jenny Lolong	Women's Kumite -53 kg	2006 Asian Games
Bronze	Mardiah Nasution	Women's Kumite +60 kg	2006 Asian Games
Bronze	Faisal Zainuddin	Men's Kata Individual	2010 Asian Games
Bronze	Donny Dharmawan	Men's Kumite -60 kg	2010 Asian Games
Bronze	Ahmad Zigi Zaresta Yuda	Men's Individual Kata	2018 Asian Games
Bronze	Jintar Simanjuntak	Men's Kumite -67 kg	2018 Asian Games
Bronze	Cok Istri Agung Sanistyarani	Women's Kumite -55 kg	2018 Asian Games
Bronze	Ignatius Joshua Kandou	Men's Kumite -75 kg	2022 Asian Games
Bronze	Cok Istri Agung Sanistyarani	Women's Kumite -55 kg	2026 Asian Games
Bronze	Leica Al Humaira Lubis	Women's Kumite +68 kg	2026 Asian Games

=== Kurash ===
Medal	Name	Event	Games
Bronze	Khasani Najmu Shifa	Women's 63 kg	2018 Asian Games

=== Mixed martial arts ===
Medal	Name	Event	Games
Bronze	Vallensia Fahira Hotmauli	Women's modern 54 kg	2026 Asian Games

=== Padel ===
Medal	Name	Event	Games
Silver	Fadona Kusumawati; Fitriani Sabatini	Women's pairs	2026 Asian Games
Bronze	Novela Rezha Millenia Putria; Beatrice Gumulya	Women's pairs	2026 Asian Games

=== Paragliding ===
Medal	Name	Event	Games
Gold	Men's team: Aris Apriansyah; Hening Paradigma; Jafro Megawanto; Joni Efendi; Roni Pratama	Men's team Accuracy	2018 Asian Games
Gold	Jafro Megawanto	Men's individual Accuracy	2018 Asian Games
Silver	Women's team: Ika Ayu Wulandari; Lis Adriana; Rika Wijayanti	Women's team Accuracy	2018 Asian Games
Bronze	Rika Wijayanti	Women's individual Accuracy	2018 Asian Games
Bronze	Women's team: Ika Ayu Wulandari; Lis Adriana; Rika Wijayanti	Women's team Cross Country	2018 Asian Games
Bronze	Men's team: Aris Apriansyah; Hening Paradigma; Jafro Megawanto; Joni Efendi; Roni Pratama	Men's team Cross Country	2018 Asian Games

=== Pencak silat ===
Medal	Name	Event	Games
Gold	Abdul Malik	Men's tanding class B (50-55 kg)	2018 Asian Games
Gold	Hanifan Yudani Kusumah	Men's tanding class C (55-60 kg)	2018 Asian Games
Gold	Iqbal Candra Pratama	Men's tanding class D (60-65 kg)	2018 Asian Games
Gold	Komang Harik Adi Putra	Men's tanding class E (65-70 kg)	2018 Asian Games
Gold	Aji Bangkit Pamungkas	Men's tanding class I (85-90 kg)	2018 Asian Games
Gold	Wewey Wita	Women's tanding class B (50-55 kg)	2018 Asian Games
Gold	Sarah Tria Monita	Women's tanding class C (55-60 kg)	2018 Asian Games
Gold	Pipiet Kamelia	Women's tanding class D (60-65 kg)	2018 Asian Games
Gold	Puspa Arumsari	Women's tunggal	2018 Asian Games
Gold	Ayu Sidan Wilantari; Ni Made Dwiyanti	Women's Ganda	2018 Asian Games
Gold	Gina Tri Lestari; Lutfi Nurhasanah; Pramudita Yuristya	Women's team	2018 Asian Games
Gold	Sugianto	Men's tunggal	2018 Asian Games
Gold	Hendy; Yola Primadona Jampil	Men's ganda	2018 Asian Games
Gold	Nunu Nugraha; Asep Yuldan Sani; Anggi Mubarok	Men's team	2018 Asian Games
Bronze	Amri Rusdana	Men's tanding class F (70-75 kg)	2018 Asian Games

=== Roller sports – Skateboarding ===
Medal	Name	Event	Games
Silver	Jason Dennis Lijnzaat	Men's park skateboarding	2018 Asian Games
Silver	Sanggoe Darma Tanjung	Men's street skateboarding	2018 Asian Games
Silver	Sanggoe Darma Tanjung	Men's street skateboarding	2022 Asian Games
Bronze	Pevi Permana Putra	Men's park skateboarding	2018 Asian Games
Bronze	Bunga Nyimas	Women's street skateboarding	2018 Asian Games

=== Rowing ===
Medal	Name	Event	Games
Gold	Jefri Ardianto; Rio Darmawan; Ferdiansyah; Tanzil Hadid; Ujang Hasbulloh; Ihram; Ardi Isadi; Muhad Yakin; Ali Buton	Men's lightweight eight	2018 Asian Games
Silver	Lasmin	Men's singles sculls	1998 Asian Games
Silver	Ali Buton; Ferdiansyah; Ihram; Ardi Isadi	Men's lightweight coxless four	2018 Asian Games
Silver	Kakan Kusmana; Memo; Edwin Rudiana; Sulpianto	Men's quadruple sculls	2018 Asian Games
Silver	Ali Mardiansyah; Rafiq Wijdan Yasir	Men's lightweight double sculls	2026 Asian Games
Silver	Memo; Ihram; Rendi Setia Maulana; Febrian	Men's quadruple sculls	2026 Asian Games
Bronze	Juliati; Nelliewaty; Tuah; Tutie	Women's Lightweight coxless four	1990 Asian Games
Bronze	Agus Budi Aji; Aldino Maryandi; Rahmat; Rodiaman	Men's Lightweight coxless four	2002 Asian Games
Bronze	Thomas Hallatu; Iswandi; Jamaluddin; Sumardi	Men's coxless four	2006 Asian Games
Bronze	Pere Karoba	Women's singles sculls	2006 Asian Games
Bronze	Tanzil Hadid; Ihram; Ardi Isadi; Muhad Yakin	Men's lightweight quadruple sculls	2014 Asian Games
Bronze	Julianti; Yayah Rokayah	Women's coxless pair	2018 Asian Games
Bronze	Chelsea Corputty; Julianti; Wa Ode Rahmanjani; Yayah Rokayah	Women's coxless four	2018 Asian Games
Bronze	Chelsea Corputty; Mutiara Rahma Putri	Women's lightweight double sculls	2022 Asian Games
Bronze	Ihram; Memo	Men's double sculls	2022 Asian Games
Bronze	Rifqi Taufiqurahman; Kakan Kusmana; Sulpianto; Rendi Setia Maulana; Asuhan Pattiha; Ferdiansyah; Denri Alghiffari; Ardi Isadi; Ujang Hasbulloh	Men's coxed eight	2022 Asian Games

=== Sailing ===
Medal	Name	Event	Games
Gold	Oka Sulaksana	Men's mistral heavy	1998 Asian Games
Gold	Oka Sulaksana	Men's mistral heavy	2002 Asian Games
Silver	Oka Sulaksana	Men's mistral	2010 Asian Games
Bronze	John Gunawan; David Udjulawa	Flying Dutchman	1970 Asian Games
Bronze	Abdul Malik Faisal	Division II	1986 Asian Games
Bronze	Oka Sulaksana	Men's mistral heavy	2006 Asian Games

=== Sepaktakraw ===
Medal	Name	Event	Games
Gold	Men's team: Muhammad Hardiansyah Muliang; Nofrizal; Rizky Abdul Rahman Pago; Abdul Halim Radjiu; Saiful Rijal; Husni Uba	Men's quadrant	2018 Asian Games
Silver	Men's team: Muhammad Hardiansyah Muliang; Nofrizal; Victoria Eka Prasetya; Abdul Halim Radjiu; Herson Mohamad Saipul	Men's regu	2018 Asian Games
Silver	Men's team: Muhammad Hardiansyah Muliang; Muhammad Hafidz; Rusdi; Diky Apriadi; Rijal Saiful; Abdul Halim Radjiu	Men's quadrant	2022 Asian Games
Silver	Women's team: Leni; Lena; Florensia Cristy; Fujy Lestari; Kusnelia; Dita Pratiwi	Women's quadrant	2022 Asian Games
Silver	Muhammad Hardiansyah Muliang; Jelki Ladada; Saiful Rijal; Yudha Aswinatama; Muhammad Ubaidur Rohman; Andi Try Sandi Saputra	Men's quadrant	2026 Asian Games
Bronze	Men's team: Jusri Pakke; Yudi Purnomo; Husni Uba	Men's doubles	2006 Asian Games
Bronze	Men's team: Muhammad Nasrum; Jusri Pakke; Edy Suwarno; Yudi Purnomo; Husni Uba	Men's regu	2006 Asian Games
Bronze	Men's team: Abrian Sihab Aldilatama; Suko Hartono; Muhammad Nasrum; Nurkholis; Jusri Pakke; Yudi Purnomo; Stephanus Sampe; Muhammad Suardi; Wisnu Dwi Suhantoro; Edy Suwarno; Triaji; Husni Uba	Men's team regu	2006 Asian Games
Bronze	Men's team: Jusri Pakke; Yudi Purnomo; Husni Uba	Men's doubles	2010 Asian Games
Bronze	Women's team: Asmira; Florensia Cristy; Jumasiah; Mega Citra Kusuma; Lena; Leni; Aliya Prihatini; Nur Qadriyanti; Dini Mita Sari; Rike Media Sari; Hasmawati Umar	Women's team regu	2010 Asian Games
Bronze	Men's team: Abrian Sihab Aldilatama; Syamsul Akmal; Firmansyah; Syamsul Hadi; Nofrizal; Hendra Pago; Andi Paturay; Victoria Eka Prasetyo; Saiful Rizal; Husni Uba; Yovi Hendra Utama; Muhammad Ruswan Wajib	Men's team regu	2014 Asian Games
Bronze	Women's team: Florensia Cristy; Lena; Leni; Dini Mita Sari; Rike Media Sari	Women's regu	2014 Asian Games
Bronze	Women's team: Florensia Cristy; Jumasiah; Kusnelia; Lena; Leni; Widya Andrini Modjundju; Dini Mita Sari; Rike Media Sari; Nur Isni Chikita Sumito; Hasmawati Umar; Irma Wati	Women's team regu	2014 Asian Games
Bronze	Men's team: Rezki Yusuf Djaina; Muhammad Hardiansyah Muliang; Nofrizal; Hendra Pago; Rizky Abdul Rahman Pago; Abdul Halim Radjiu; Saiful Rijal; Herson Mohamad Saipul; Husni Uba	Men's team Doubles	2018 Asian Games
Bronze	Men's team: Syamsul Akmal; Rezki Yusuf Djaina; Muhammad Hardiansyah Muliang; Nofrizal; Hendra Pago; Rizky Abdul Rahman Pago; Victoria Eka Prasetya; Abdul Halim Radjiu; Saiful Rijal; Herson Mohamad Saipul; Andi Try Sandi Saputra; Husni Uba	Men's team regu	2018 Asian Games
Bronze	Women's team: Akyko Micheel Kapito; Dini Mita Sari; Florensia Cristy; Kusnelia; Lena; Leni	Women's quadrant	2018 Asian Games
Bronze	Women's team: Asmira; Florensia Cristy; Frisca Kharisma Indrasari; Wan Annisa Rachmadi; Lena; Leni; Fitra Siu; Dona Aulia; Dita Pratiwi; Asmaaul Husna; Fujy Lestari; Kusnelia	Women's team regu	2022 Asian Games
Bronze	Muhammad Hardiansyah Muliang; Rizki Yusuf Djaina; Gelvin Usman A; Jelki Ladada; Saiful Rijal; Syamsul Akmal; Yudha Aswinatama; Muhammad Ubaidur Rohman; Andi Try Sandi Saputra	Men's team regu	2026 Asian Games
Bronze	Kusnelia; Ayvonne Halimatu Zahra Perdhana; Dini Mita Sari; Wan Annisa Rachmadi; Frisca Kharisma Indrasari; Choirunnisa; Yuliana; Fujy Anggy Lestari; Dita Pratiwi	Women's team regu	2026 Asian Games
Bronze	Kusnelia; Dini Mita Sari; Wan Annisa Rachmadi; Choirunnisa; Fujy Anggy Lestari; Dita Pratiwi	Women's quadrant	2026 Asian Games

=== Shooting ===
Medal	Name	Event	Games
Gold	Muhammad Sejahtera Dwi Putra	Men's 10 m running target	2022 Asian Games
Gold	Muhammad Sejahtera Dwi Putra	Men's 10 m running target mixed run	2022 Asian Games
Silver	Lely Sampurno	Women's 50 m pistol	1962 Asian Games
Silver	Elias Joseph Lessy	Men's 300 m rifle 3 positions	1962 Asian Games
Silver	Muhammad Sejahtera Dwi Putra	Men's 10 m running target mixed run	2018 Asian Games
Silver	Sulthanul Aulia Maruf; Muhamad Iqbal Raia Prabowo; Wira Sukmana	10 m air rifle men's team	2026 Asian Games
Bronze	Lukman Saketi	Men's 25 m rapid fire pistol	1954 Asian Games
Bronze	John Posuma	Men's 25 m rapid fire pistol	1962 Asian Games
Bronze	Elias Joseph Lessy	Men's 10 m air rifle	1966 Asian Games
Bronze	Muhammad Badri Akbar; Muhammad Sejahtera Dwi Putra; Irfandi Julio	Men's 10 m running target team	2022 Asian Games
Bronze	Muhammad Badri Akbar; Muhammad Sejahtera Dwi Putra; Irfandi Julio	Men's 10 m running target mixed run team	2022 Asian Games
Bronze	Feny Bachtiar; Nourma Try Indriani; Rica Nensi Perangin Angin	Women's 10 m running target team	2022 Asian Games
Bronze	Muhamad Fawwaz Aditia Farrel; Aris Febrianto; Dewa Putu Yadi Suteja	Men's 25 m rapid fire pistol team	2026 Asian Games

=== Soft tennis ===
Medal	Name	Event	Games
Silver	Edi Kusdaryanto	Men's singles	2014 Asian Games
Silver	Elbert Sie	Men's singles	2018 Asian Games
Bronze	Prima Simpatiaji; Maya Rosa	Mixed doubles	2014 Asian Games
Bronze	Prima Simpatiaji	Men's singles	2018 Asian Games
Bronze	Dwi Rahayu Pitri	Women's singles	2018 Asian Games
Bronze	Men's team: M. Hemat Bhakti Anugerah; Irfandi Hendrawan; Gusti Jaya Kusuma; Elbert Sie; Prima Simpatiaji	Men's team	2018 Asian Games
Bronze	Men's team: M. Hemat Bhakti Anugerah; Mario Harley Alibasa; Sunu Wahyu Trijati; Tio Juliandi Hutauruk; Fernando Sanger	Men's team	2022 Asian Games
Bronze	Muhammad Reza Falevi; Tio Juliandi Hutauruk; Rizky Laluyan; Bagus Angga Boedy Pradewa; Fernando Sanger	Men's team	2026 Asian Games

=== Sport climbing ===
Medal	Name	Event	Games
Gold	Aries Susanti Rahayu	Women's speed	2018 Asian Games
Gold	Aries Susanti Rahayu; Fitriyani; Puji Lestari; Rajiah Sallsabillah	Women's speed relay	2018 Asian Games
Gold	Abu Dzar Yulianto; Veddriq Leonardo; Muhammad Hinayah; Sufriyanto Rindi	Men's speed relay	2018 Asian Games
Gold	Desak Made Rita Kusuma Dewi	Women's speed	2022 Asian Games
Gold	Desak Made Rita Kusuma Dewi	Women's speed	2026 Asian Games
Silver	Puji Lestari	Women's speed	2018 Asian Games
Silver	Aspar; Muhammad Fajri Alfian; Sabri; Pangeran Septo Wibowo Siburian	Men's speed relay	2018 Asian Games
Silver	Aspar; Veddriq Leonardo; Kiromal Katibin; Rahmad Adi Mulyono	Men's speed relay	2022 Asian Games
Silver	Desak Made Rita Kusuma Dewi; Rajiah Sallsabillah; Alivany Ver Khadijah; Nurul Iqamah	Women's speed relay	2022 Asian Games
Bronze	Aspar	Men's speed	2018 Asian Games
Bronze	Rajiah Sallsabillah	Women's speed	2022 Asian Games
Bronze	Veddriq Leonardo	Men's speed	2022 Asian Games

=== Surfing ===
Medal	Name	Event	Games
Silver	I Made Pajar Ariyana	Men's shortboard	2026 Asian Games

=== Swimming ===
Medal	Name	Event	Games
Silver	Men's team	Men's 4 × 200 m freestyle relay	1962 Asian Games
Silver	Iris Tobing	Women's 100 m breaststroke	1962 Asian Games
Silver	Women's team: Oey Lian Nio; Iris Tobing; Lie Lan Hoa; Enny Nuraeni	Women's 4 × 100 m medley relay	1962 Asian Games
Silver	Kristiono Sumono	Men's 200 m freestyle	1978 Asian Games
Silver	Gerald Item	Men's 200 m butterfly	1978 Asian Games
Silver	Dwi Widjayanto; John David Item; Gerald Item; Kristiono Sumono	Men's 4 × 200 m freestyle relay	1978 Asian Games
Bronze	Habib Nasution	Men's 200 m freestyle	1958 Asian Games
Bronze	Tio Tjoe Hong; Abdul Kadir; Tjoan Kiet Lie; Habib Nasution	Men's 4 × 100 m medley relay	1958 Asian Games
Bronze	Ria Tobing	Women's 100 m breaststroke	1958 Asian Games
Bronze	Achmad Dimyati	Men's 100 m freestyle	1962 Asian Games
Bronze	Poo Boen Tiong	Men's 200 m backstroke	1962 Asian Games
Bronze	Men's team: Kemal Lubis; Abdul Kadir; Sudarman; Achmad Dimyati	Men's 4 × 100 m medley relay	1962 Asian Games
Bronze	Oey Lian Nio	Women's 100 m backstroke	1962 Asian Games
Bronze	Iris Tobing	Women's 200 m breaststroke	1962 Asian Games
Bronze	Enny Nuraeni; Lie Lan Hoa; Lie Mu Lhan; Lie Ying Hoa	Women's 4 × 100 m freestyle relay	1962 Asian Games
Bronze	Winny Han; Fay Loa; Liem Hong Ing; Enny Nuraeni	Women's 4 × 100 m medley relay	1966 Asian Games
Bronze	Kristiono Sumono	Men's 400 m freestyle	1978 Asian Games
Bronze	Gerald Item	Men's 100 m butterfly	1978 Asian Games
Bronze	Gerald Item	Men's 200 m individual medley	1978 Asian Games
Bronze	Gerald Item	Men's 400 m individual medley	1978 Asian Games
Bronze	Gerald Item; Dwi Widjayanto; John David Item; Kristiono Sumono	Men's 4 × 100 m freestyle relay	1978 Asian Games
Bronze	Lukman Niode; Kun Hantyo; Gerald Item; Dwi Widjayanto	Men's 4 × 100 m medley relay	1978 Asian Games
Bronze	Nunung Selowati	Women's 200 m butterfly	1978 Asian Games
Bronze	Nanik Suwadji	Women's 400 m individual medley	1978 Asian Games
Bronze	Naniek Suwadji; Anita Sapardjiman; Tati Irianti Erningpraja; Nunung Selowati	Women's 4 × 100 m medley relay	1978 Asian Games
Bronze	Lukman Niode	Men's 100 m freestyle	1982 Asian Games
Bronze	Lukman Niode	Men's 100 m backstroke	1982 Asian Games
Bronze	Lukman Niode	Men's 200 m backstroke	1982 Asian Games
Bronze	Zain Chaidir; John David Item; Gerald Item; Lukman Niode	Men's 4 × 100 m freestyle relay	1982 Asian Games
Bronze	Ridwan Muis; John David Item; Gerald Item; Lukman Niode	Men's 4 × 200 m freestyle relay	1982 Asian Games
Bronze	Lukman Niode; Faezal Mulyawan; John David Item; Gerald Item	Men's 4 × 100 m medley relay	1982 Asian Games
Bronze	Wirmandi Sugriat	Men's 200 m breaststroke	1986 Asian Games
Bronze	Lukman Niode; Wirmandi Sugriat; Sabeni Sudiono; Daniel Arif Budiman	Men's 4 × 100 m medley relay	1986 Asian Games
Bronze	Richard Sam Bera	Men's 100 m freestyle	1990 Asian Games
Bronze	Wirmandi Sugriat	Men's 200 m breaststroke	1990 Asian Games
Bronze	Khim Tjia Fei; Meitri Widya Pangestika; Yen Yen Gunawan; Elfira Rosa Nasution	Women's 4 × 100 m freestyle relay	1990 Asian Games

=== Table tennis ===
Medal	Name	Event	Games
Silver	Empie Wuisan; Sinyo Supit	Men's doubles	1978 Asian Games

=== Taekwondo ===
Medal	Name	Event	Games
Gold	Defia Rosmaniar	Women's individual Poomsae	2018 Asian Games
Silver	Yefi Triaji	Men's -50 kg	1986 Asian Games
Silver	Abdul Rozak	Men's -58 kg	1986 Asian Games
Silver	Lam Ting	Men's -76 kg	1986 Asian Games
Silver	Lugi Riyandi	Men's -50 kg	1994 Asian Games
Silver	Alfons Lung	Men's -58 kg	1994 Asian Games
Silver	Satriyo Rahadhani	Men's -54 kg	1998 Asian Games
Bronze	Budi Setiawan	Men's -54 kg	1986 Asian Games
Bronze	Andri Halim	Men's -83 kg	1994 Asian Games
Bronze	Juana Wangsa Putri	Women's -47 kg	1998 Asian Games
Bronze	Sinta Berliana Heru	Women's +70 kg	1998 Asian Games
Bronze	Muhammad Dalam Imam	Men's -54 kg	2002 Asian Games
Bronze	Juana Wangsa Putri	Women's -51 kg	2002 Asian Games
Bronze	Amalia Kurniasih Palupi	Women's +73 kg	2006 Asian Games
Bronze	Fransisca Valentina	Women's -46 kg	2010 Asian Games

=== Tennis ===
Medal	Name	Event	Games
Gold	Women's team: Lany Kaligis; Lita Liem Sugiarto; Mien Suhadi	Women's team	1966 Asian Games
Gold	Lany Kaligis	Women's singles	1966 Asian Games
Gold	Lany Kaligis; Lita Liem Sugiarto	Women's doubles	1966 Asian Games
Gold	Lita Liem Sugiarto	Women's singles	1974 Asian Games
Gold	Men's team: Hadiman; Yustedjo Tarik; Gondo Widjojo; Atet Wijono	Men's team	1978 Asian Games
Gold	Atet Wijono	Men's singles	1978 Asian Games
Gold	Yustedjo Tarik; Hadiman	Men's doubles	1978 Asian Games
Gold	Men's team: Hadiman; Yustedjo Tarik; Donald Wailan-Walalangi; Tintus Wibowo	Men's team	1982 Asian Games
Gold	Yustedjo Tarik	Men's singles	1982 Asian Games
Gold	Suzanna Wibowo; Yayuk Basuki	Women's doubles	1986 Asian Games
Gold	Suzanna Wibowo; Yayuk Basuki	Women's doubles	1990 Asian Games
Gold	Yayuk Basuki	Women's singles	1998 Asian Games
Gold	Yayuk Basuki; Hary Suharyadi	Mixed doubles	1990 Asian Games
Gold	Women's team: Liza Andriyani; Wynne Prakusya; Wukirasih Sawondari; Angelique Widjaja	Women's team	2002 Asian Games
Gold	Aldila Sutjiadi; Christopher Rungkat	Mixed doubles	2018 Asian Games
Silver	Women's team: Vonny Djoa; Mien Suhadi; Jooce Suwarimbo	Women's team	1962 Asian Games
Silver	Women's team: Yayuk Basuki; Irawati Moerid; Lukky Tedjamukti; Suzanna Wibowo	Women's team	1990 Asian Games
Silver	Men's team: Donny Susetyo; Suwandi; Benny Wijaya; Bonit Wiryawan	Men's team	1994 Asian Games
Silver	Women's team: Yayuk Basuki; Natalia Soetrisno; Romana Tedjakusuma; Veronica Widyadharma	Women's team	1994 Asian Games
Silver	Angelique Widjaja; Wynne Prakusya	Women's doubles	2002 Asian Games
Bronze	Benny Wijaya	Men's singles	1994 Asian Games
Bronze	Lita Liem Sugiarto	Women's singles	1966 Asian Games
Bronze	Lany Kaligis	Women's singles	1974 Asian Games
Bronze	Yayuk Basuki	Women's singles	1994 Asian Games
Bronze	Donald Wailan; Sulistyono	Men's doubles	1986 Asian Games
Bronze	Bonit Wiryawan; Daniel Heryanto	Men's doubles	1990 Asian Games
Bronze	Donny Susetyo; Teddy Tandjung	Men's doubles	1994 Asian Games
Bronze	Jooce Suwarimbo; Mien Suhadi	Women's doubles	1962 Asian Games
Bronze	Lukky Tedjamukti; Irawati Moerid	Women's doubles	1990 Asian Games
Bronze	Jooce Suwarimbo; Sofjan Mudjirat	Mixed doubles	1962 Asian Games
Bronze	Lany Kaligis; Go Soen Houw	Mixed doubles	1966 Asian Games
Bronze	Lita Liem Sugiarto; Soetarjo Soegiarto	Mixed doubles	1966 Asian Games
Bronze	Ayi Sutarno; Hadiman	Mixed doubles	1978 Asian Games
Bronze	Suzanna Wibowo; Tintus Wibowo	Mixed doubles	1986 Asian Games
Bronze	Suzanna Wibowo; Bonit Wiryawan	Mixed doubles	1990 Asian Games
Bronze	Men's team: Sofyan Mudjirat; N. Sanusi; Sutarjo Sugiarto; K. Tjokrosaputro	Men's team	1962 Asian Games
Bronze	Men's team: Daniel Heryanto; Hary Suharyadi; Benny Wijaya; Bonit Wiryawan	Men's team	1990 Asian Games
Bronze	Men's team: Peter Handoyo; Suwandi; Tintus Wibowo	Men's team	2002 Asian Games
Bronze	Women's team: Lita Sugiarto; Yolanda Soemarno; Ayi Sutarno; Elvis Tarik	Women's team	1978 Asian Games
Bronze	Women's team: Suzanna Anggarkusuma; Yayuk Basuki; Sri Utaminingsih	Women's team	1986 Asian Games
Bronze	Women's team: Liza Andriyani; Yayuk Basuki; Irawati Moerid Iskandar; Wynne Prakusya	Women's team	1998 Asian Games
Bronze	Aldila Sutjiadi; Janice Tjen	Women's doubles	2022 Asian Games

=== Teqball ===
Medal	Name	Event	Games
Silver	Sumaya	Women's singles	2026 Asian Games
Bronze	Yoga Ardika Putra	Men's singles	2026 Asian Games

=== Volleyball ===
Medal	Name	Event	Games
Bronze	Women's team: Evy Sofia Achid; Jane Gunawan; Paulina Lessil; Helena Marwati; Joan Paulini; Rasni Rasmo; Lenny Sahertian; Augustien Siahaija; Hartaty Soekardjo; Amy Surjotjokro; Tan Lan Ing; Tjia Boet Nio	Women's volleyball	1962 Asian Games
Bronze	Women's team: Evy Sofia Achid; Jane Gunawan; Meity Joseph; Paulina Lessil; Helena Marwati; Joan Paulini; Rasni Rasmo; Hetty Rosadi; Lenny Sahertian; Augustien Siahaija; Hartaty Soekardjo; Amy Surjotjokro; Tan Lan Ing; Andi Tja Tjambolang; Tjia Boet Nio	Women's 9-man volleyball	1962 Asian Games

=== Water Polo ===
Medal	Name	Event	Games
Silver	Men's team: Abdul Ghofur; Ade Sutargi; Benjamin Idris; Boen Swan Tjiang; Guus Mauri; J. Lamisi; J. Syahrial; Lim Sing Poen; Mingky Lias; Tjiong Kian Liem; Welly Agus Salim	Men's water polo	1962 Asian Games
Bronze	Men's team: Gashmir Daud; Djie Soen Kion; Djie Soen Kwah; Benjamin Idris; Liem Siong Lien; Lim Sing Lok; Margono; Oei Teng Pie; Otman Siragar; Bunasir Surachmad; Tio Tjoe Hong	Men's water polo	1954 Asian Games
Bronze	Men's team: Benjamin Idris; Kuswara; Liem Siong Lien; Lim Sing Lok; Lim Sing Poen; Oei Teng Pie; Rudy Oen; Tio Tjoe Hong	Men's water polo	1958 Asian Games
Bronze	Men's team	Men's water polo	1966 Asian Games
Bronze	Men's team: Ade Sutargi; Cebjar Hernowo Triono; Doddy Agussalim; Gunawan Santoso; Johanes Bambang Budihardja; Pandapotan Nasution; Rudy Sastranegara; Tengku Achmadsjah; Tengku Kamrol; Valentinus Sutandio; Zakaria Nasution	Men's water polo	1970 Asian Games

=== Weightlifting ===
Medal	Name	Event	Games
Gold	Eko Yuli Irawan	Men's 62 kg	2018 Asian Games
Gold	Rahmat Erwin Abdullah	Men's 73 kg	2022 Asian Games
Gold	Rahmat Erwin Abdullah	Men's 75 kg	2026 Asian Games
Silver	Madek Kasman	Men's 60 kg	1970 Asian Games
Silver	Abdul Rosjid	Men's 110 kg	1970 Asian Games
Silver	Patmawati Abdul Hamid	Women's 60 kg	1990 Asian Games
Silver	Supeni	Women's 50 kg	1994 Asian Games
Silver	Erwin Abdullah	Men's 69 kg	2002 Asian Games
Silver	Sinta Darmariani	Women's 69 kg	2010 Asian Games
Silver	Sri Wahyuni Agustiani	Women's 48 kg	2014 Asian Games
Silver	Sri Wahyuni Agustiani	Women's 48 kg	2018 Asian Games
Bronze	Thio Ging Hwie	Men's 67.5 kg	1954 Asian Games
Bronze	Maman Suryaman	Men's 52 kg	1982 Asian Games
Bronze	Dirdja Wihardja	Men's 56 kg	1986 Asian Games
Bronze	Ponco Imbarwati	Women's 48 kg	1990 Asian Games
Bronze	Patmawati Abdul Hamid	Women's 54 kg	1994 Asian Games
Bronze	Sri Indriyani	Women's 48 kg	1998 Asian Games
Bronze	Raema Lisa Rumbewas	Women's 48 kg	2002 Asian Games
Bronze	Tanti Pratiwi	Women's 58 kg	2002 Asian Games
Bronze	Sinta Darmariani	Women's 75 kg	2006 Asian Games
Bronze	Jadi Setiadi	Men's 56 kg	2010 Asian Games
Bronze	Eko Yuli Irawan	Men's 62 kg	2010 Asian Games
Bronze	Triyatno	Men's 69 kg	2010 Asian Games
Bronze	Eko Yuli Irawan	Men's 62 kg	2014 Asian Games
Bronze	Surahmat bin Suwoto Wijoyo	Men's 56 kg	2018 Asian Games
Bronze	Luluk Diana Tri Wijayana	Women's 49 kg	2026 Asian Games

=== Wrestling ===
Medal	Name	Event	Games
Bronze	Mujari	Men's Greco-Roman -52 kg	1962 Asian Games
Bronze	Rachman Firdaus	Men's Greco-Roman -63 kg	1962 Asian Games

=== Wushu ===
Medal	Name	Event	Games
Gold	Juwita Niza Wasni	Women's nanquan	2014 Asian Games
Gold	Lindswell Kwok	Women's taijiquan & taijijian	2018 Asian Games
Gold	Harris Horatius	Men's nanquan & nangun	2022 Asian Games
Silver	Susyana Tjhan	Women's changquan	2006 Asian Games
Silver	Ivana Ardelia Irmanto	Women's nanquan	2010 Asian Games
Silver	Lindswell Kwok	Women's taijiquan	2014 Asian Games
Silver	Edgar Xavier Marvelo	Men's changquan	2018 Asian Games
Silver	Edgar Xavier Marvelo	Men's changquan	2022 Asian Games
Silver	Samuel Marbun	Men's sanda 65 kg	2022 Asian Games
Bronze	Jainab	Women's taijiquan	1998 Asian Games
Bronze	Susyana Tjhan	Women's changquan	2010 Asian Games
Bronze	Ivana Ardelia Irmanto	Women's nanquan	2014 Asian Games
Bronze	Achmad Hulaefi	Men's daoshu & gunshu	2018 Asian Games
Bronze	Yusuf Widiyanto	Men's sanda 56 kg	2018 Asian Games
Bronze	Puja Riyaya	Men's sanda 70 kg	2018 Asian Games
Bronze	Seraf Naro Siregar	Men's daoshu & gunshu	2022 Asian Games
Bronze	Tharisa Dea Florentina	Women's sanda 52 kg	2022 Asian Games
Bronze	Eugenia Diva Widodo	Women's changquan	2026 Asian Games
Bronze	Seraf Naro Siregar	Men's changquan	2026 Asian Games
Bronze	Thania Kusumaningtyas	Women's sanda 60 kg	2026 Asian Games
Bronze	Fereddy Sinaga	Men's sanda 56 kg	2026 Asian Games
Bronze	Bintang Reindra Nada Guitara	Men's sanda 60 kg	2026 Asian Games

== Podium sweeps ==
Year	Sport	Event	Gold	Silver	Bronze
1962	Badminton	Women's singles	Minarni	Corry Kawilarang	Happy Herowati

== Medalists of demonstration & exhibition sports ==
=== Archery ===
Medal	Name	Event	Games
Gold	Rachmah	Women's individual recurve	1962 Asian Games
Silver	H. Hadian	Women's individual recurve	1962 Asian Games
Silver	A. Bachrumsjah; Harsono; H. Hadian	Men's team recurve	1962 Asian Games
Bronze	Z. I. Osman	Women's individual recurve	1962 Asian Games

=== Esports ===
Medal	Name	Event	Games
Gold	Ridel Yesaya Sumarandak	Clash royale	2018 Asian Games
Silver	Hendry Koentarto Handisurya	Hearthstone	2018 Asian Games

== See also ==
- List of Asian Beach Games medalists for Indonesia
- List of Islamic Solidarity Games medalists for Indonesia
