= Tennis at the 1994 Asian Games – Men's team =

Men's team at the 1994 Asian Games
- Venue: Regional Park Tennis Stadium
- Dates: 3–7 October 1994
- Nations: 12

Medalists
gold medal	India; Zeeshan Ali, Asif Ismail, Gaurav Natekar, Leander Paes
silver medal	Indonesia; Donny Susetyo, Suwandi, Benny Wijaya, Bonit Wiryawan
bronze medal	Malaysia; Wilson Khoo, Adam Malik, Ramayah Ramachandran
bronze medal	Japan; Satoshi Iwabuchi, Goichi Motomura, Ryuso Tsujino, Yasufumi Yamamoto

Men's team
- Tennis at the 1994 Asian Games

Events
Singles	men	women
Doubles	men	women	mixed
Team	men	women
- Asian Games

The men's team tennis event was part of the tennis programme and took place between October 3 and 7, at the Hiroshima Regional Park Tennis Stadium.

India won the gold medal beating Indonesia in the final.

== Schedule ==
All times are Japan Standard Time (UTC+09:00)

Date	Time	Event
Monday, 3 October 1994	10:00	1st round
Tuesday, 4 October 1994	10:00	Quarterfinals
Wednesday, 5 October 1994	10:00	Semifinals
Friday, 7 October 1994	10:00	Final

== Results ==
1st round
Malaysia	2
Philippines	1
Chinese Taipei	3
Iran	0
Kuwait	0
China	3
Thailand	1
Uzbekistan	2

Quarterfinals
1	South Korea	1
Malaysia	2
3	India	2
Chinese Taipei	1
China	1
4	Japan	2
Uzbekistan	0
2	Indonesia	3

Semifinals
Malaysia	0
3	India	3
4	Japan	1
2	Indonesia	2

Final
3	India	3
2	Indonesia	0

=== 1st round ===
3 October	Malaysia	2–1	Philippines

Ramayah Ramachandran	0–2	Robert Angelo	2–6, 5–7
Adam Malik	2–0	Joseph Lizardo	6–4, 7–6^{(7–2)}
Ramayah Ramachandran / Adam Malik	2–0	Sofronio Palahang / Robert Angelo	6–3, 6–4

3 October	Chinese Taipei	3–0	Iran

Chen Chih-jung	2–0	Jahanbakhsh Souri	6–4, 6–1
Lien Yu-hui	2–0	Ramin Raziani	6–2, 6–4
Su Wei-yu / Tsai Chia-yen	2–0	Ramin Raziani / Mostafa Saleh	6–4, 6–3

3 October	Kuwait	0–3	China

Ayman Al-Ashwak	0–2	Xia Jiaping	1–6, 2–6
Adel Al-Shatti	0–2	Pan Bing	2–6, 3–6
Ayman Al-Ashwak / Adel Al-Shatti	0–2	Xia Jiaping / Zhang Jiuhua	2–6, 3–6

3 October	Thailand	1–2	Uzbekistan

Thanakorn Srichaphan	0–2	Dmitri Tomashevich	2–6, 2–6
Narathorn Srichaphan	0–2	Oleg Ogorodov	6–7^{(4–7)}, 4–6
Vittaya Samrej / Woraphol Thongkhamchu	2–1	Dmitri Tomashevich / Oleg Ogorodov	3–6, 6–4, 6–4

=== Quarterfinals ===
4 October	South Korea	1–2	Malaysia

Yoon Yong-il	2–0	Wilson Khoo	6–3, 6–1
Shin Han-cheol	1–2	Adam Malik	6–4, 3–6, 4–6
Chang Eui-jong / Kim Chi-wan	1–2	Adam Malik / Ramayah Ramachandran	4–6, 7–5, 5–7

4 October	India	2–1	Chinese Taipei

Gaurav Natekar	0–2	Chen Chih-jung	6–7^{(3–7)}, 4–6
Leander Paes	2–0	Lien Yu-hui	6–0, 6–4
Gaurav Natekar / Leander Paes	2–0	Chen Chih-jung / Lien Yu-hui	7–6^{(7–4)}, 7–6^{(7–3)}

4 October	China	1–2	Japan

Xia Jiaping	0–2	Goichi Motomura	6–7^{(3–7)}, 4–6
Pan Bing	2–0	Yasufumi Yamamoto	6–0, 6–3
Pan Bing / Xia Jiaping	0–2	Satoshi Iwabuchi / Ryuso Tsujino	3–6, 5–7

4 October	Uzbekistan	0–3	Indonesia

Dmitri Tomashevich	0–2	Suwandi	6–7^{(7–9)}, 1–6
Oleg Ogorodov	0–2	Benny Wijaya	3–6, 2–6
Oleg Ogorodov / Dmitri Tomashevich	0–2	Bonit Wiryawan / Donny Susetyo	1–6, 6–7^{(5–7)}

=== Semifinals ===
5 October	Malaysia	0–3	India

Ramayah Ramachandran	0–2	Asif Ismail	1–6, 5–7
Adam Malik	0–2	Leander Paes	2–6, 2–6
Wilson Khoo / Ramayah Ramachandran	0–2	Zeeshan Ali / Gaurav Natekar	1–6, 4–6

5 October	Japan	1–2	Indonesia

Goichi Motomura	1–2	Suwandi	6–2, 3–6, 7–9
Yasufumi Yamamoto	1–2	Benny Wijaya	6–7^{(2–7)}, 6–3, 3–6
Satoshi Iwabuchi / Ryuso Tsujino	2–0	Bonit Wiryawan / Donny Susetyo	6–2, 6–4

=== Final ===
7 October	India	3–0	Indonesia

Asif Ismail	2–1	Suwandi	6–1, 6–7^{(6–8)}, 6–3
Leander Paes	2–0	Benny Wijaya	6–1, 6–3
Zeeshan Ali / Gaurav Natekar	2–1	Bonit Wiryawan / Donny Susetyo	4–6, 6–3, 7–5
