= Malaysia at the 1994 Asian Games =

- IOC code: MAS
- NOC: Olympic Council of Malaysia
- Website: www.olympic.org.my (in English)

in Hiroshima
- Competitors: 104 in 17 sports
- Medals Ranked 9th: Gold 4 Silver 2 Bronze 13 Total 19

Asian Games appearances (overview)
- 1954; 1958; 1962; 1966; 1970; 1974; 1978; 1982; 1986; 1990; 1994; 1998; 2002; 2006; 2010; 2014; 2018; 2022; 2026

Other related appearances
- North Borneo (1954, 1958, 1962); Sarawak (1962)

Malaysia competed in the 1994 Asian Games in Hiroshima, Japan from 2 to 16 October 1994. Malaysia ended the games at 19 overall medals.

== Medal summary ==
=== Medals by sport ===
Sport	Gold	Silver	Bronze	Total	Rank
Athletics	0	0	1	1	13
Badminton	0	1	2	3	3
Bowling	2	1	2	5	3
Karate	0	0	3	3	9
Sailing	1	0	0	1	4
Sepaktakraw	1	0	0	1	1
Taekwondo	0	0	3	3	10
Tennis	0	0	1	1	6
Wushu	0	0	1	1	9
Total	4	2	13	19	9

=== Medallists ===
Medal	Name	Sport	Event
Gold	Lydia Kwah; Shalin Zulkifli; Shirley Chow	Bowling	Women's trios
Gold	Shalin Zulkifli	Bowling	Women's all-events
Gold	Ryan Tan	Sailing	Optimist
Gold		Sepaktakraw	Men's regu
Silver	Cheah Soon Kit; Soo Beng Kiang	Badminton	Men's doubles
Silver	Lydia Kwah; Shirley Chow	Bowling	Women's doubles
Bronze	Nur Herman Majid	Athletics	Men's 110 metres hurdles
Bronze	Yap Kim Hock; Lee Wai Leng	Badminton	Mixed doubles
Bronze	Cheah Soon Kit; Muralidesan Krishnamurthy; Ong Ewe Hock; Pang Chen; Soo Beng Kiang; Tan Kim Her; Yap Kim Hock	Badminton	Men's team
Bronze	Richard Phua	Bowling	Men's singles
Bronze	Lydia Kwah	Bowling	Women's all-events
Bronze	Puvaneswaran Ramasamy	Karate	Men's kumite 60 kg
Bronze	Arivalagan Ponniah	Karate	Men's kumite 75 kg
Bronze	Fairuz Mohd Fajeer	Karate	Men's kumite +80 kg
Bronze	Wong Ching Beng	Taekwondo	Men's 58 kg
Bronze	Rajendran Rajoo	Taekwondo	Men's 70 kg
Bronze	Jeetender Kumar Rai	Taekwondo	Men's 76 kg
Bronze	Adam Malik; Ramayah Ramachandran; Wilson Khoo	Tennis	Men's team
Bronze	Phoon Chee Kong	Wushu	Men's nanquan

== Athletics ==
Key

- Note–Ranks given for track events are within the athlete's heat only
- Q = Qualified for the next round
- q = Qualified for the next round as a fastest loser or, in field events, by position without achieving the qualifying target
- NR = National record
- N/A = Round not applicable for the event
- Bye = Athlete not required to compete in round

Men
Track event

Athlete	Event	Final	
Athlete	Event	Time	Rank
Nur Herman Majid	110 m hurdles	13.73 NR	3rd place, bronze medalist(s)

== Badminton ==
Athlete	Event	Round of 32	Round of 16	Quarterfinal	Semifinal	Final	
Athlete	Event	Opposition Score	Opposition Score	Opposition Score	Opposition Score	Opposition Score	Rank
Muralidesan Krishnamurthy	Men's singles	Bye	Kim Hak-kyun (KOR); L 4–15, 15–18	Did not advance			
Ong Ewe Hock	Men's singles	Bye	Takahiro Suka (JPN); W 15–4, 15–4	Dong Jiong (CHN); L 11–15, 9–15	Did not advance		
Cheah Soon Kit; Soo Beng Kiang	Men's doubles	Bye	Bambang Suprianto; Hermawan Susanto (INA); W 15–5, 15–2	Shuji Matsuno; Shinji Matsuura (JPN); W 15–13, 5–15, 15–3	Jiang Xin; Huang Zhanzhong (CHN); W 15–9, 15–5	Ricky Subagja; Rexy Mainaky (INA); L 10–15, 2–15	2nd place, silver medalist(s)
Tan Kim Her; Yap Kim Hock	Men's doubles	Bye	Takuya Katayama; Yuzo Kubota (JPN); W 15–4, 15–8	Chen Kang; Chen Hongyong (CHN); L 11–15, 11–15	Did not advance		
Cheah Soon Kit; Muralidesan Krishnamurthy; Ong Ewe Hock; Pang Chen; Soo Beng Kiang; Tan Kim Her; Yap Kim Hock	Men's team	—N/a		Maldives (MDV); W 2–0, 2–0, 2–0, 2–0, 2–0	South Korea (KOR); L 0–2, 0–2, 2–0, 2–1, 0–2	Did not advance	3rd place, bronze medalist(s)
Tan Lee Wai; Lee Wai Leng	Women's doubles	—N/a	Ruksita Sookboonmak; Duchfun Eingsuwanpattama (THA); W 15–8, 15–6	Tomomi Matsuo; Kyoko Sasage (JPN); L 11–15, 5–15	Did not advance		
Cheah Soon Kit; Tan Lee Wai	Mixed doubles	—N/a	Seiichi Watanabe; Yasuko Mizui (JPN); W 15–11, 15–3	Yoo Yong-sung; Chung So-young (KOR); L 4–15, 2–15	Did not advance		
Yap Kim Hock; Lee Wai Leng	Mixed doubles	—N/a	Vacharapan Kumthong; Sujitra Ekmongkolpaisarn (THA); W 15–6, 15–5	Shuji Matsuno; Tomomi Matsuo (JPN); W 15–5, 15–11	Kang Kyung-jin; Jang Hye-ock (KOR); L 11–15, 3–15	Did not advance	3rd place, bronze medalist(s)

== Bowling ==
Men

Athlete	Event	Final	
Athlete	Event	Result	Rank
Richard Phua	Singles	1286 GR	3rd place, bronze medalist(s)
	Team	5951	4

Women

Athlete	Event	Final	
Athlete	Event	Result	Rank
Shalin Zulkifli	Singles	1213	4
Lydia Kwah Poh Ling; Shirley Chow Chew Chun	Doubles	2419	2nd place, silver medalist(s)
Lydia Kwah Poh Ling; Shalin Zulkifli; Shirley Chow Chew Chun	Trios	3734	1st place, gold medalist(s)
Lydia Kwah Poh Ling; Shalin Zulkifli; Shirley Chow Chew Chun	Team	5695	4
Shalin Zulkifli	All-events	5016	1st place, gold medalist(s)
Lydia Kwah	All-events	4761	3rd place, bronze medalist(s)

== Cycling ==
=== Road ===
Athletes	Event	Time	Rank
Murugayan Kumaresan	Men's individual road race	4:32:24	10
Shahrulneeza Razali	Men's individual road race	4:32:29	13

=== Track ===
Points race

Athlete	Event	Qualification		Final	
Athlete	Event	Points	Rank	Points	Rank
Murugayan Kumaresan	Men's points race	—N/a		11	7
Shahrulneeza Razali	Men's points race	—N/a		2	14

== Field hockey ==
=== Men's tournament ===
Group A

Team	Pld	W	D	L	GF	GA	GD	Pts
Pakistan	4	4	0	0	19	2	+17	8
Japan	4	2	1	1	7	8	−1	5
Kazakhstan	4	2	0	2	13	7	+6	4
Malaysia	4	1	1	2	10	8	+2	3
Oman	4	0	0	4	1	25	−24	0

Qualified for the semifinals
Qualified for the 5th – 8th classification

5 October
18:00

Malaysia	7–0	Oman

Regional Park, Hiroshima

7 October
14:00

Malaysia	1–3	Kazakhstan

Regional Park, Hiroshima

8 October
18:00

Pakistan	4–1	Malaysia

Regional Park, Hiroshima

10 October
16:00

Malaysia	1–1	Japan

Regional Park, Hiroshima

Fifth to eighth place classification

12 October
14:00

Malaysia	4–1	China

Regional Park, Hiroshima

Fifth and sixth place match

13 October
18:00

Kazakhstan	0–5	Malaysia

Regional Park, Hiroshima

Ranked 5th in final standings

== Football ==
=== Men's tournament ===
Group B

Team	Pld	W	D	L	GF	GA	GD	Pts
Uzbekistan	4	4	0	0	15	5	+10	12
Saudi Arabia	4	3	0	1	9	8	+1	9
Malaysia	4	1	1	2	6	11	−5	4
Hong Kong	4	1	0	3	6	8	−2	3
Thailand	4	0	1	3	8	12	−4	1

Qualified for the quarterfinals

1 October

Malaysia	4 – 3	Hong Kong
Abu Haniffah 48'; Adnan 53'; Thanasegar 80'; Salleh 88'		Bredbury 77', 79', 89' (pen.)

Hiroshima Stadium, Hiroshima

3 October
19:00

Uzbekistan	5 – 0	Malaysia
Fyodorov 24'; Durmonov 31', 44'; Shkvyrin 78', 83'

Regional Park Stadium, Hiroshima

7 October
19:00

Malaysia	1 – 2	Saudi Arabia
Salleh 44'		Al-Oromi 4'; Zubromawi 71' (pen.)

Bingo Athletic Stadium, Hiroshima

9 October
19:00

Thailand	1 – 1	Malaysia
Senamuang 23'		Abu Haniffah 26'

Regional Park Stadium, Hiroshima

Ranked 12th in final standings

== Golf ==
Athlete	Event	Round 1		Round 2		Round 3		Round 4		Total score	Final rank
Athlete	Event	Score	Rank	Score	Rank	Score	Rank	Score	Rank	Total score	Final rank
Ailian Lim	Women's individual	75	6	80	14	75	4	78	12	308	9
Cindy Lee Shu Ching	Women's individual	83	16	79	13	78	9	74	3	314	13
Lim Siew Ai	Women's individual	80	13	76	5	79	13	78	12	310	10
Ailian Lim; Cindy Lee Shu Ching; Lim Siew Ai	Women's team									612	5

== Gymnastics ==
=== Rhythmic ===
Women

Athlete	Event						
Athlete	Event	Rope Rank	Hoop Rank	Clubs Rank	Ribbon Rank	Total	Rank
Farah Zellinah Kemal	Individual all-around					31.900	9

== Karate ==
Men
Kumite

Athlete	Event	Final	
Athlete	Event	Opposition Score	Rank
Puvaneswaran Ramasamy	60 kg		3rd place, bronze medalist(s)
Arivalagan Ponniah	75 kg		3rd place, bronze medalist(s)
Fairuz Mohd Fajeer	+80 kg		3rd place, bronze medalist(s)

Women
Kumite

Athlete	Event	Final	
Athlete	Event	Opposition Score	Rank
Aini Awang Muda	53 kg		5
Ramlah Abdul Hamid	60 kg		5

== Sailing ==
Open

Athlete	Event	Final	
Athlete	Event	Net points	Rank
Ryan Tan	Optimist		3rd place, bronze medalist(s)

== Sepaktakraw ==
Athletes	Event	Preliminary round		Semifinal	Final	Rank
Athletes	Event	Opposition Score	Rank	Opposition Score	Opposition Score	Rank
	Men's regu	Singapore; W 15–11, 15–11 South Korea; W 15–3, 18–1; Japan; W 15–4, 15–1	1 Q	Indonesia; W 15–3, 15–10	Thailand; W 15–9, 15–13	1st place, gold medalist(s)

== Taekwondo ==
Men

Athlete	Event	Final	
Athlete	Event	Opposition Score	Rank
Wong Ching Beng	58 kg		3rd place, bronze medalist(s)
Rajendran Rajoo	70 kg		3rd place, bronze medalist(s)
Jeetender Kumar Rai	76 kg		3rd place, bronze medalist(s)

== Tennis ==
Athlete	Event	Round of 32	Round of 16	Quarterfinal	Semifinal	Final	
Athlete	Event	Opposition Score	Opposition Score	Opposition Score	Opposition Score	Opposition Score	Rank
Adam Malik	Men's singles	Robert Angelo (PHI); W 7–5, 6–1	Shin Han-cheol (KOR); L 7^{9}–6^{7}, 2–6, 3–6	Did not advance			
Ramayah Ramachandran	Men's singles	Ramin Raziani (IRI); W 6^{5}–7^{7}, 7^{8}–6^{6}, 6–3	Leander Paes (IND); L 2–6, 1–6	Did not advance			

Men's team
Round of 16

3 October	Malaysia	2–1	Philippines

Ramayah Ramachandran	0–2	Robert Angelo	2–6, 5–7
Adam Malik	2–0	Joseph Lizardo	6–4, 7^{7}–6^{2}
Ramayah Ramachandran / Adam Malik	2–0	Sofronio Palahang / Robert Angelo	6–3, 6–4

Quarterfinal

4 October	South Korea	1–2	Malaysia

Yoon Yong-il	2–0	Wilson Khoo	6–3, 6–1
Shin Han-cheol	1–2	Adam Malik	6–4, 3–6, 4–6
Chang Eui-jong / Kim Chi-wan	1–2	Adam Malik / Ramayah Ramachandran	4–6, 7–5, 5–7

Semifinal

5 October	Malaysia	0–3	India

Ramayah Ramachandran	0–2	Asif Ismail	1–6, 5–7
Adam Malik	0–2	Leander Paes	2–6, 2–6
Wilson Khoo / Ramayah Ramachandran	0–2	Zeeshan Ali / Gaurav Natekar	1–6, 4–6

Ranked 3rd in final standings

== Wushu ==
Men

Athlete	Event	Final	
Athlete	Event	Result	Rank
Phoon Chee Kong	Nanquan	9.53	3rd place, bronze medalist(s)
Cheah Kok Luan	Taijiquan	9.28	5
Choy Yeen Onn	Changquan	28.58	6

Women

Athlete	Event	Final	
Athlete	Event	Result	Rank
Ng Choo Bee	Nanquan	9.41	7
