= Tennis at the 1994 Asian Games – Men's singles =

Men's singles at the 1994 Asian Games
- Venue: Regional Park Tennis Stadium
- Dates: 8–13 October 1994
- Competitors: 25 from 13 nations

Medalists
gold medal	Pan Bing	China
silver medal	Yoon Yong-il	South Korea
bronze medal	Leander Paes	India
bronze medal	Benny Wijaya	Indonesia

Men's singles
- Tennis at the 1994 Asian Games

Events
Singles	men	women
Doubles	men	women	mixed
Team	men	women
- Asian Games

The men's singles tennis event was part of the tennis programme and took place between October 8 and 13, at the Hiroshima Regional Park Tennis Stadium.

== Schedule ==
All times are Japan Standard Time (UTC+09:00)

Date	Time	Event
Saturday, 8 October 1994	10:00	1st round
Sunday, 9 October 1994	10:00	2nd round
Tuesday, 11 October 1994	10:00	Quarterfinals
Wednesday, 12 October 1994	10:00	Semifinals
Thursday, 13 October 1994	10:00	Final

== Results ==
=== Final ===
Final
6	Yoon Yong-il (KOR)	2	1
2	Pan Bing (CHN)	6	6

=== Top half ===
1st round
Ramayah Ramachandran (MAS)	6^{5}	7^{8}	6
Ramin Raziani (IRI)	7^{7}	6^{6}	3
Narathorn Srichaphan (THA)	6	3	11
Ryuso Tsujino (JPN)	3	6	9
Mudrik Al-Rawahi (OMA)	0	0
8	Suwandi (INA)	6	6
Lien Yu-hui (TPE)	5	6	7
Joseph Lizardo (PHI)	7	1	5
Ayman Al-Ashwak (KUW)	3	3
Xia Jiaping (CHN)	6	6

2nd round
1	Leander Paes (IND)	6	6
Ramayah Ramachandran (MAS)	2	1
Narathorn Srichaphan (THA)	4	6	3
8	Suwandi (INA)	6	2	6
4	Oleg Ogorodov (UZB)	6	5	6
Lien Yu-hui (TPE)	3	7	2
Xia Jiaping (CHN)	4	6	3
6	Yoon Yong-il (KOR)	6	3	6

Quarterfinals
1	Leander Paes (IND)	6	6
8	Suwandi (INA)	1	0
4	Oleg Ogorodov (UZB)	3	5
6	Yoon Yong-il (KOR)	6	7

Semifinals
1	Leander Paes (IND)	7^{7}	4	5
6	Yoon Yong-il (KOR)	6^{2}	6	7

=== Bottom half ===
1st round
Adam Malik (MAS)	7	6
Robert Angelo (PHI)	5	1
Chen Chih-jung (TPE)	4	6	6
Thanakorn Srichaphan (THA)	6	1	4
Dmitri Tomashevich (UZB)	6	6
Adel Al-Shatti (KUW)	3	3
Jahanbakhsh Souri (IRI)	3	3
Gaurav Natekar (IND)	6	6

2nd round
5	Shin Han-cheol (KOR)	6^{7}	6	6
Adam Malik (MAS)	7^{9}	2	3
Chen Chih-jung (TPE)	5	6	1
3	Benny Wijaya (INA)	7	4	6
7	Yasufumi Yamamoto (JPN)	7^{7}	6
Dmitri Tomashevich (UZB)	6^{4}	4
Gaurav Natekar (IND)	2	5
2	Pan Bing (CHN)	6	7

Quarterfinals
5	Shin Han-cheol (KOR)	7	4	6
3	Benny Wijaya (INA)	5	6	8
7	Yasufumi Yamamoto (JPN)	2	4
2	Pan Bing (CHN)	6	6

Semifinals
3	Benny Wijaya (INA)	3	3
2	Pan Bing (CHN)	6	6
