= Golf at the 1994 Asian Games =

- Venue: Hiroshima Country Club
- Dates: 6–9 October 1994
- Competitors: 61 from 12 nations

Golf was one of the many sports which was held at the 1994 Asian Games at Hiroshima Country Club in Hiroshima, Japan, between 6 and 9 October 1994. Golf for the second time featured four events: the men's individual and team events and women's individual and team events.

== Medalists ==
Event	Gold	Silver	Bronze
Men's individual	Kaname Yokoo; Japan	Zhang Lianwei; China	Hong Chia-yuh; Chinese Taipei
Men's team	Japan; Reiji Kojima; Kiyotake Oie; Taro Okabe; Kaname Yokoo	Chinese Taipei; Chang Tse-peng; Hong Chia-yuh; Lai Ying-juh; Yeh Wei-tze	South Korea; Ahn Joo-hwan; Hu Suk-ho; Kim Chang-min; Kim Jong-chul
Women's individual	Huang Yu-chen; Chinese Taipei	Kang Soo-yun; South Korea	Song Chae-eun; South Korea
Women's team	Chinese Taipei; Chang Chin-sha; Huang Yu-chen; Lee Jui-hui	South Korea; Han Hee-won; Kang Soo-yun; Song Chae-eun	China; Huang Lixia; Lin Shaoru

== Medal table ==
Rank	Nation	Gold	Silver	Bronze	Total
1	Chinese Taipei (TPE)	2	1	1	4
2	Japan (JPN)	2	0	0	2
3	South Korea (KOR)	0	2	2	4
4	China (CHN)	0	1	1	2
Totals (4 entries)		4	4	4	12

== Participating nations ==
A total of 61 athletes from 12 nations competed in golf at the 1994 Asian Games:

- Bahrain (4)
- Brunei (4)
- China (6)
- Chinese Taipei (7)
- India (4)
- Indonesia (4)
- Japan (7)
- Malaysia (3)
- Pakistan (4)
- Philippines (7)
- Singapore (4)
- South Korea (7)
