= Tennis at the 1994 Asian Games – Women's team =

Women's team at the 1994 Asian Games
- Venue: Regional Park Tennis Stadium
- Dates: 3–6 October 1994
- Nations: 7

Medalists
gold medal	Japan; Mana Endo, Nana Miyagi, Naoko Sawamatsu, Ai Sugiyama
silver medal	Indonesia; Yayuk Basuki, Natalia Soetrisno, Romana Tedjakusuma, Veronica Widyadharma
bronze medal	Chinese Taipei; Jane Chi, Ho Chiu-mei, Wang Shi-ting, Weng Tzu-ting
bronze medal	China; Bi Ying, Chen Li, Li Fang, Yi Jingqian

Women's team
- Tennis at the 1994 Asian Games

Events
Singles	men	women
Doubles	men	women	mixed
Team	men	women
- Asian Games

The women's team tennis event was part of the tennis programme and took place between October 3 and 6, at the Hiroshima Regional Park Tennis Stadium.

== Schedule ==
All times are Japan Standard Time (UTC+09:00)

Date	Time	Event
Monday, 3 October 1994	10:00	Quarterfinals
Tuesday, 4 October 1994	10:00	Semifinals
Thursday, 6 October 1994	10:00	Final

== Results ==
Quarterfinals
Thailand	0
Chinese Taipei	3
Tajikistan	0
China	3
South Korea	1
2	Indonesia	2

Semifinals
1	Japan	3
Chinese Taipei	0
China	1
2	Indonesia	2

Final
1	Japan	3
2	Indonesia	0

=== Quarterfinals ===
3 October	Thailand	0–3	Chinese Taipei

Suvimol Duangchan	0–2	Weng Tzu-ting	5–7, 2–6
Tamarine Tanasugarn	0–2	Wang Shi-ting	0–6, 1–6
Pimpisamai Kansuthi / Sasithorn Tangthienkul	0–2	Jane Chi / Wang Shi-ting	1–6, 0–6

3 October	Tajikistan	0–3	China

Julia Roudkovskaya	0–2	Chen Li	0–6, 1–6
Elena Mamedbaeva	0–2	Li Fang	1–6, 2–6
Julia Roudkovskaya / Elena Mamedbaeva	0–2	Chen Li / Li Fang	1–6, 0–6

3 October	South Korea	1–2	Indonesia

Choi Ju-yeon	0–2	Romana Tedjakusuma	6–7^{(13–15)}, 2–6
Park Sung-hee	1–2	Yayuk Basuki	7–6^{(7–3)}, 4–6, 2–6
Choi Ju-yeon / Park Sung-hee	2–0	Romana Tedjakusuma / Yayuk Basuki	6–1, 6–0

=== Semifinals ===
4 October	Japan	3–0	Chinese Taipei

Mana Endo	2–0	Weng Tzu-ting	6–1, 6–1
Naoko Sawamatsu	2–0	Wang Shi-ting	6–2, 7–6^{(7–2)}
Nana Miyagi / Ai Sugiyama	2–0	Jane Chi / Wang Shi-ting	7–6^{(7–5)}, 6–4

4 October	China	1–2	Indonesia

Chen Li	2–0	Romana Tedjakusuma	6–4, 6–0
Li Fang	0–2	Yayuk Basuki	4–6, 2–6
Chen Li / Li Fang	1–2	Romana Tedjakusuma / Yayuk Basuki	3–6, 6–2, 3–6

=== Final ===
6 October	Japan	3–0	Indonesia

Mana Endo	2–0	Romana Tedjakusuma	6–1, 6–0
Naoko Sawamatsu	2–0	Yayuk Basuki	6–1, 6–4
Nana Miyagi / Ai Sugiyama	2–0	Romana Tedjakusuma / Natalia Soetrisno	6–2, 6–1
