= Sepak takraw at the 1994 Asian Games =

- Venue: Saeki Ward Sports Center
- Dates: 12–15 October 1994
- Nations: 9

Sepak takraw was contested at the 1994 Asian Games in Saeki Ward Sports Center, Hiroshima, Japan from 12 to 15 October 1994. Men's teams from nine nations participated.

== Medalists ==
Event	Gold	Silver	Bronze
Regu	Malaysia; Iskandar Arshad; Ahmad Jais Baharun; Malik Samsudin; Zabidi Shariff	Thailand; Narongchai Kaewnopparat; Udomsak Kiatchupipat; Kampol Tassit; Tawit Wongkluen	Singapore; Nur Hisham Adam; Mohd Fami Mohamed; Mislan Munjari; Ahmad Yasin

== Results ==
=== Preliminary round ===
==== Group A ====
Pos	Team	Pld	W	L	SF	SA	SD	Pts	Qualification
1	Thailand	4	4	0	8	0	+8	8	Semifinals
2	Indonesia	4	3	1	6	3	+3	6	Semifinals
3	Laos	4	2	2	4	4	0	4	5th place match
4	Brunei	4	1	3	3	7	−4	2	
5	China	4	0	4	1	8	−7	0	

Source: Results

Date		Score		Set 1	Set 2	Set 3
12 Oct	Thailand	2–0	Indonesia	15–7	15–3	
12 Oct	Brunei	0–2	Laos	7–15	15–17	
12 Oct	Thailand	2–0	China	15–2	15–11	
13 Oct	Brunei	2–1	China	9–15	15–9	15–9
13 Oct	Indonesia	2–0	Laos	15–10	15–6	
13 Oct	Thailand	2–0	Brunei	15–2	15–0	
13 Oct	Indonesia	2–0	China	15–5	15–8	
14 Oct	Thailand	2–0	Laos	15–3	15–11	
14 Oct	Indonesia	2–1	Brunei	15–7	16–17	18–15
14 Oct	Laos	2–0	China	Walkover		

==== Group B ====
Pos	Team	Pld	W	L	SF	SA	SD	Pts	Qualification
1	Malaysia	3	3	0	6	0	+6	6	Semifinals
2	Singapore	3	2	1	4	2	+2	4	Semifinals
3	Japan	3	1	2	2	4	−2	2	5th place match
4	South Korea	3	0	3	0	6	−6	0	

Source: Results

Date		Score		Set 1	Set 2	Set 3
12 Oct	Malaysia	2–0	Singapore	15–11	15–11	
12 Oct	South Korea	0–2	Japan	13–15	10–15	
13 Oct	Malaysia	2–0	South Korea	15–3	15–1	
13 Oct	Singapore	2–0	Japan	15–4	15–7	
14 Oct	Singapore	2–0	South Korea	15–7	15–4	
14 Oct	Malaysia	2–0	Japan	15–4	15–1	

=== 5th place match ===
Date		Score		Set 1	Set 2	Set 3
15 Oct	Laos	2–0	Japan	15–6	15–8	

=== Knockout round ===
Semifinals
15 October
Thailand	2
Singapore	0
15 October
Malaysia	2
Indonesia	0

Final
15 October
Thailand	0
Malaysia	2
Bronze medal match
15 October
Singapore	2
Indonesia	0

==== Semifinals ====
Date		Score		Set 1	Set 2	Set 3
15 Oct	Thailand	2–0	Singapore	15–1	15–9	
15 Oct	Malaysia	2–0	Indonesia	15–3	15–10	

==== Bronze medal match ====
Date		Score		Set 1	Set 2	Set 3
15 Oct	Singapore	2–0	Indonesia	15–10	18–13	

==== Final ====
Date		Score		Set 1	Set 2	Set 3
15 Oct	Thailand	0–2	Malaysia	9–15	13–15	
