= Nurzuhairah Yazid =

Singaporean martial artist

Nurzuhairah
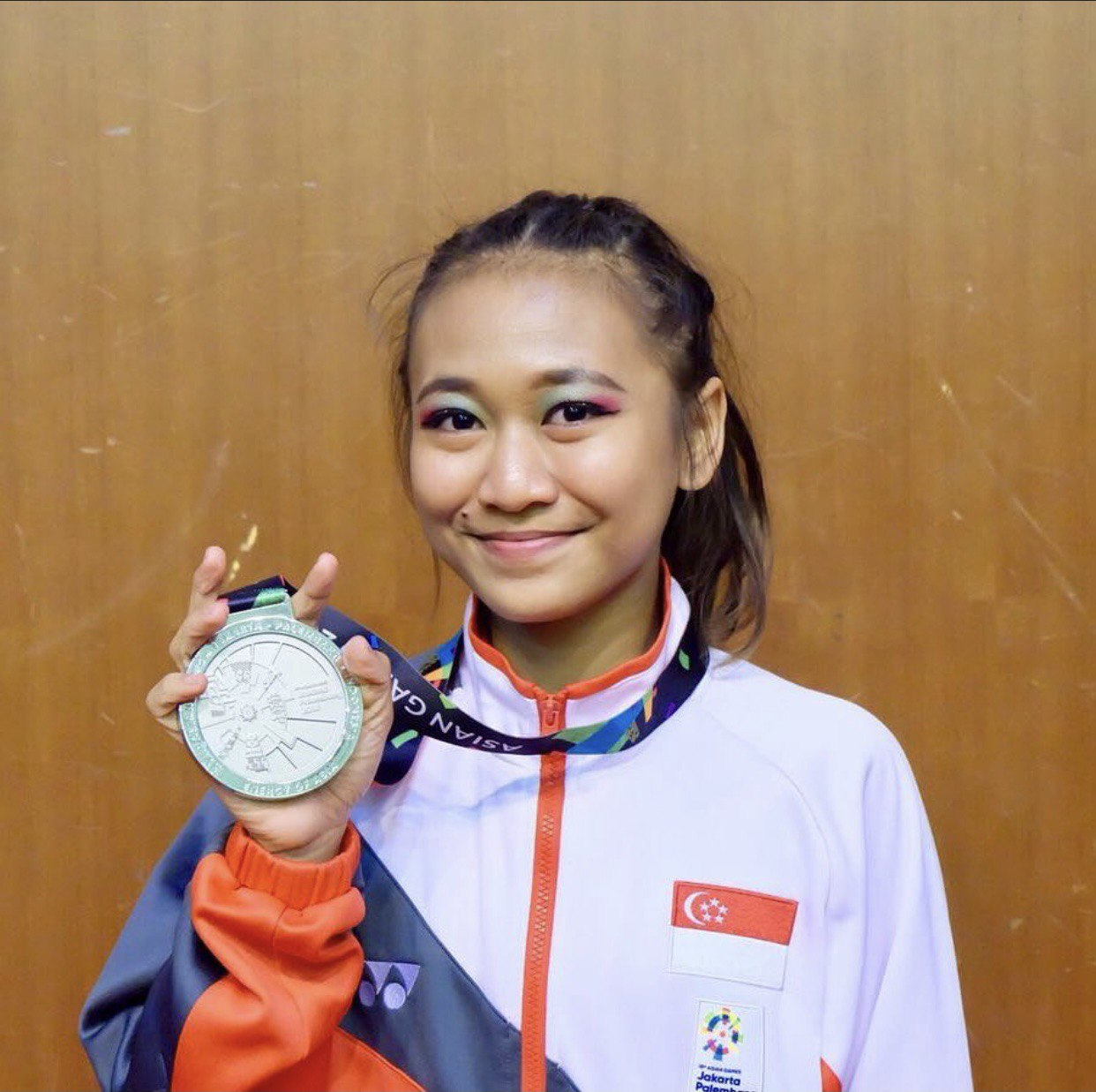

Personal information
- Full name: Nurzuhairah Binte Mohammad Yazid
- Nationality: Singaporean
- Born: 21 April 1998 (age 28)

Sport
- Country: Singapore
- Sport: Pencak Silat
- Events: Artistic Women's Singles, Artistic Women's Team
Medal record
Women's Pencak Silat
Representing Singapore
Event	1st	2nd	3rd
Asian Games	0	1	0
World Championships	1	1	2
Southeast Asian Games	1	0	0
Total	2	2	2
Asian Games
Silver medal – second place	Jakarta, Indonesia	Women's Singles
World Championships
Bronze medal – third place	2015 Phuket	45kg-50kg
Bronze medal – third place	2016 Bali	Women's Team
Silver medal – second place	2018 Singapore	Women's Team
Gold medal – first place	2018 Singapore	Women's Singles
Southeast Asian Games
Gold medal – first place	2017 Kuala Lumpur	Women's Singles

Nurzuhairah Mohammad Yazid (born 21 April 1998) is a Singaporean pencak silat practitioner. She represented Singapore at the 2018 Asian Games and won a silver medal in women's singles event held at Padepokan Pencak Silat Taman Mini Indonesia Indah, Jakarta. She claimed her first world title in the Female Artistic Singles Category that took place from 13 to 16 December 2018 at OCBC Arena Hall 1, Singapore Sports Hub.

She also won a gold medal in the women's singles event at the 2017 Southeast Asian Games.

== Early life ==
Nurzuhairah was born and raised in Singapore. She has two younger siblings, Nurzianah Mohd Yazid and Aniq Asri Mohd Yazid, who is also a national pencak silat athlete. When she was 11, Nurzuhairah picked up Pencak Silat encouraged by her mother and joined the national team two years later in 2011.

== Career ==
At the age of 17, Nurzuhairah first represented Singapore in the 16th World Pencak Silat Championship, making her the bronze medalist for women's class A 45–50 kg event that was held in Phuket, Thailand in 2015.

Nurzuhairah made her debut participating in the women's singles event at the 2017 Southeast Asian Games, which shocked many, by winning the gold medal defeating Indonesia and Brunei. In the 2018 Asian Games, Nurzuhairah finished with 445 points as she claimed the first silver medal in pencak silat in the women's individual tunggal event behind Puspa Arumsari of host Indonesia. This was the first time silat was included at the Asian Games as a medal sport.

== Achievements ==
International Games
Year	Venue	Event	Result	
2015	Phuket, Thailand	Women's Class A 45 kg-50 kg	(bronze) Bronze	16th World Pencak Silat Championships
2016	Bali, Indonesia	Women's Team	(bronze) Bronze	17th World Pencak Silat Championships
2016	Da Nang Vietnam	Women's Team	(silver) Silver	Asian Beach Games
2017	Kuala Lumpur, Malaysia	Women's Singles	(gold) Gold	Southeast Asian Games
2017	Kuala Lumpur, Malaysia	Women's Singles	(gold) Gold	Southeast Asian Games
2018	Kashmir, India	Women's Singles	(gold) Gold	Asian Pencak Silat Championships
2018	OCBC Arena, Singapore	Women's Singles	(gold) Gold	18th World Pencak Silat Championships
2018	OCBC Arena, Singapore	Women's Team	(silver) Silver	18th World Pencak Silat Championships
2018	Pencak Silat Taman Mini Indonesia Indah, Jakarta, Indonesia	Women's Singles	(silver) Silver	Asian Games
2019	Belgium	Women's Singles	(bronze) Bronze	24th Belgium Open Championship
2019	Chungju, South Korea	Women's Singles	(gold) Gold	Chunju World Martial Arts Mastership
2019	Manila, Philippines	Women's Singles	(gold) Gold	PRE Southeast Asian Games
2019	Manila, Philippines	Women's Team	(silver) Silver	PRE Southeast Asian Games
2019	Sterling, Virginia, USA	Women's Singles	(gold) Gold	United States Open Pencak Silat Championships
2019	Kuala Lumpur, Malaysia	Women's Singles	(silver) Silver	2nd Open Malaysia International Pencak Silat Championships
2019	Patong Beach, Phuket, Thailand	Women's Singles	(silver) Silver	World Beach Pencak Silat Championships
2019	Yanji, China	Women's Singles	(gold) Gold	5th Asian Pencak Silat Championships
2019	Yanji, China	Women's Team	(silver) Silver	5th Asian Pencak Silat Championships

== Awards ==
Singapore National Olympic Council & Singapore Olympic Foundation (SOF)
Year	Award	Category
2015	Peter Lim Scholarship	Individual
2016	Peter Lim Scholarship	Individual
2017	Peter Lim Scholarship	Individual
2017	Singapore Sports Awards	Team
2017	Singapore Sports Awards	Special Award
2018	Singapore Sports Awards	Sportsboy/Sportsgirl
2018	Singapore Sports Excellence Scholarships	Individual
2019	Singapore Sports Awards	Team
2019	Singapore Sports Awards	Sportswoman Finalist

== See also ==
- List of Singapore world champions in sports
