= Angelo Constantino =

Filipino bowler (died 2019)

Personal information
- Full name: Angelo Nathaniel Constantino
- Died: January 11, 2019 (aged 48) San Juan, Metro Manila, Philippines

Sport
- Country: Philippines
- Sport: Bowling
Medal record
Representing the Philippines
Men's Bowling
World Youth Bowling Championships
Gold medal – first place	Venezuela 1992	Singles
Gold medal – first place	Venezuela 1992	Doubles
Silver medal – second place	Venezuela 1992	All-events
Bronze medal – third place	Venezuela 1992	Masters
Asian Games
Silver medal – second place	1994 Hiroshima	Team of five

Angelo Nathaniel Constantino was a Filipino bowler who was a gold medalist at the singles event of the 1992 World Youth Bowling Championships in Venezuela. He also won the gold medal in the doubles event of the same tournament along with Noberito Constantino as well as the silver medal in the all-events and a bronze in the Masters. He was also part of the silver medal winning team of five at the 1994 Asian Games.

After retiring from competitive bowling, Angelo Constantino dedicated more focus on being a bowling coach and mentored a team based at the E-Lanes Bowling Center in Greenhills, San Juan, Metro Manila.

On January 11, 2019, Constantino was shot multiple times by a man at the E-Lanes Bowling Center and died while he was being rushed to a nearby hospital. Until his death, he worked as a manager at E-Lanes. He was aged 48.
