= Kaname Yokoo =

Japanese professional golfer (born 1972)

Kaname Yokoo 横尾要
Personal information
- Nationality: Japan
- Born: 24 July 1972 (age 54) Tokyo, Japan
- Height: 1.76 m (5 ft 9 in)
- Weight: 75 kg (165 lb; 11.8 st)

Career
- Sport: Golf
- College: Nihon University
- Turned professional: 1995
- Former tours: Japan Golf Tour; PGA Tour
- Professional wins: 7
- Highest ranking: 95 (3 September 2000)

Number of wins by tour
- Japan Golf Tour: 5
- Other: 2

Best results in major championships
- Masters Tournament: DNP
- PGA Championship: DNP
- U.S. Open: T57: 1999
- The Open Championship: DNP
Medal record
Asian Games
Gold medal – first place	1994 Hiroshima	Men's individual
Gold medal – first place	1994 Hiroshima	Men's team

Kaname Yokoo (Japanese: 横尾要, born 24 July 1972) is a Japanese professional golfer.

== Early life ==
Yokoo was born in Tokyo.

== Professional career ==
Yokoo plays mainly on the Japan Golf Tour and has five wins there. After he won the Japan PGA Match-Play Championship in 2000 he reached his highest world ranking of #95.

Yokozuna's played full-time on the PGA Tour from 2001 to 2003 with his best finish a T-2 at the 2002 Phoenix Open. He recorded four other top-10 finishes on tour.

He finished runner-up at the 2005 Dunlop Phoenix Tournament, losing to Tiger Woods in a playoff.

== Amateur wins ==
- 1994 Asian Games

== Professional wins (7) ==
=== Japan Golf Tour wins (5) ===
No.	Date	Tournament	Winning score	Margin of victory	Runner(s)-up
1	8 Nov 1998	Acom International	46 pts (10-14-5-17=46)	3 points	(Japan) Katsumasa Miyamoto
2	10 Oct 1999	Tokai Classic	−14 (66-67-72-69=274)	1 stroke	(Fiji) Vijay Singh
3	3 Sep 2000	Japan PGA Match-Play Championship Promise Cup	2 and 1		(Japan) Toru Taniguchi
4	24 Nov 2002	Dunlop Phoenix Tournament	−15 (66-65-69-69=269)	1 stroke	(Spain) Sergio García
5	28 May 2006	Mitsubishi Diamond Cup Golf	−9 (71-70-68-66=275)	2 strokes	(Japan) Nozomi Kawahara, (Japan) Toru Suzuki

Japan Golf Tour playoff record (0–1)

No.	Year	Tournament	Opponent	Result
1	2005	Dunlop Phoenix Tournament	(United States) Tiger Woods	Lost to birdie on fourth extra hole

=== Other wins (2) ===
- 2009 Hirao Masaaki Charity Golf
- 2017 Legend Charity Pro-Am

== Results in major championships ==
Tournament	1999	2000	2001	2002	2003	2004	2005	2006	2007	2008	2009	2010
U.S. Open	T57			CUT					CUT		CUT	CUT

Note: Yokoo only played in the U.S. Open.

Did not play

CUT = missed the half-way cut
"T" = tied

== Results in The Players Championship ==
Tournament	2002
The Players Championship	CUT

CUT = missed the halfway cut

== Results in World Golf Championships ==
Tournament	2003
Match Play	
Championship	
Invitational	T58

Did not play

"T" = Tied

== See also ==
- 2000 PGA Tour Qualifying School graduates
