= Karate at the 1994 Asian Games =

Karate competition

- Venue: Aki Ward Sports Center
- Dates: 3–5 October 1994

Karate was competed by men and women at the 1994 Asian Games in Hiroshima, Japan. Kata was contested along with Kumite. There were 11 gold medals contested for this sport. All competition took place on October 3, 4 and 5.

== Medalists ==
=== Men ===
Event	Gold	Silver	Bronze
Kata	Ryoki Abe; Japan	Abdullah Kadir; Indonesia	Richard Lim; Philippines
Kumite −60 kg	Shinichiro Yamamoto; Japan	Trần Văn Thông; Vietnam	Ng Iat On; Macau
Kumite −60 kg	Shinichiro Yamamoto; Japan	Trần Văn Thông; Vietnam	Puvaneswaran Ramasamy; Malaysia
Kumite −65 kg	Raafat Al-Karad; Syria	Arash Javanshir; Iran	David Lay; Philippines
Kumite −65 kg	Raafat Al-Karad; Syria	Arash Javanshir; Iran	Sharif Ismail; Saudi Arabia
Kumite −70 kg	Maziar Farid-Khomami; Iran	Adel Al-Mejadi; Kuwait	Kazuaki Matsumoto; Japan
Kumite −70 kg	Maziar Farid-Khomami; Iran	Adel Al-Mejadi; Kuwait	Mohamed Salem Ghalaita; United Arab Emirates
Kumite −75 kg	Shizuo Shiina; Japan	Saeid Ashtian; Iran	Ahmad Al-Khaledi; Kuwait
Kumite −75 kg	Shizuo Shiina; Japan	Saeid Ashtian; Iran	Arivalagan Ponniah; Malaysia
Kumite −80 kg	Toshihito Kokubun; Japan	Nour Shamseh; Syria	Liao Yun-chih; Chinese Taipei
Kumite −80 kg	Toshihito Kokubun; Japan	Nour Shamseh; Syria	Isroil Ismoilov; Tajikistan
Kumite +80 kg	Yasumasa Shimizu; Japan	Abdulmuttalib Al-Bargawi; Saudi Arabia	Fairuz Mohd Fajeer; Malaysia
Kumite +80 kg	Yasumasa Shimizu; Japan	Abdulmuttalib Al-Bargawi; Saudi Arabia	Vahid Khajeh-Hosseini; Iran

=== Women ===
Event	Gold	Silver	Bronze
Kata	Hisami Yokoyama; Japan	Omita Olga Ompi; Indonesia	Chen Shu-chen; Chinese Taipei
Kumite −53 kg	Hiromi Hasama; Japan	Phạm Hồng Hà; Vietnam	Nurosi Nurasjati; Indonesia
Kumite −53 kg	Hiromi Hasama; Japan	Phạm Hồng Hà; Vietnam	Liu Ya-chen; Chinese Taipei
Kumite −60 kg	Hisako Yoshimi; Japan	Su Su-chen; Chinese Taipei	Nilawati Daud; Indonesia
Kumite −60 kg	Hisako Yoshimi; Japan	Su Su-chen; Chinese Taipei	Marliza Pg Omar; Brunei
Kumite +60 kg	Hiromi Hirose; Japan	Meity Johana Kaseger; Indonesia	Sita Kumari Rai; Nepal
Kumite +60 kg	Hiromi Hirose; Japan	Meity Johana Kaseger; Indonesia	Meghan Loo; Brunei

== Medal table ==
Rank	Nation	Gold	Silver	Bronze	Total
1	Japan (JPN)	9	0	1	10
2	Iran (IRI)	1	2	1	4
3	Syria (SYR)	1	1	0	2
4	Indonesia (INA)	0	3	2	5
5	Vietnam (VIE)	0	2	0	2
6	Chinese Taipei (TPE)	0	1	3	4
7	Kuwait (KUW)	0	1	1	2
7	Saudi Arabia (KSA)	0	1	1	2
9	Malaysia (MAS)	0	0	3	3
10	Brunei (BRU)	0	0	2	2
10	Philippines (PHI)	0	0	2	2
12	Macau (MAC)	0	0	1	1
12	Nepal (NEP)	0	0	1	1
12	Tajikistan (TJK)	0	0	1	1
12	United Arab Emirates (UAE)	0	0	1	1
Totals (15 entries)		11	11	20	42
