= Sita Kumari Rai =

Nepalese karateka

Sita Kumari Rai (born 3 January 1976) is a Nepalese Karate player. She is the first ever Nepalese women to win any sports related international medal. She won bronze in 1994 Asian games Karate (women's)+60 kg Kumite.
