= Tennis at the 1994 Asian Games – Women's singles =

Women's singles at the 1994 Asian Games
- Venue: Regional Park Tennis Stadium
- Dates: 8–13 October 1994
- Competitors: 14 from 7 nations

Medalists
gold medal	Kimiko Date	Japan
silver medal	Naoko Sawamatsu	Japan
bronze medal	Yayuk Basuki	Indonesia
bronze medal	Chen Li	China

Women's singles
- Tennis at the 1994 Asian Games

Events
Singles	men	women
Doubles	men	women	mixed
Team	men	women
- Asian Games

The women's singles tennis event was part of the tennis programme and took place between October 8 and 13, at the Hiroshima Regional Park Tennis Stadium.

== Schedule ==
All times are Japan Standard Time (UTC+09:00)

Date	Time	Event
Saturday, 8 October 1994	10:00	1st round
Sunday, 9 October 1994	10:00	Quarterfinals
Tuesday, 11 October 1994	10:00	Quarterfinals
Wednesday, 12 October 1994	10:00	Semifinals
Thursday, 13 October 1994	10:00	Final

== Results ==
1st round
Weng Tzu-ting (TPE)	6	6
Elena Mamedbaeva (TJK)	0	3
3	Yayuk Basuki (INA)	6	6
Suvimol Duangchan (THA)	4	0
Jeon Mi-ra (KOR)	1	5
Li Fang (CHN)	6	7
Chen Li (CHN)	6	6
Park Sung-hee (KOR)	3	3
Romana Tedjakusuma (INA)	0	1
4	Wang Shi-ting (TPE)	6	6
Julia Roudkovskaya (TJK)	1	3
Tamarine Tanasugarn (THA)	6	6

Quarterfinals
1	Kimiko Date (JPN)	6	6
Weng Tzu-ting (TPE)	1	1
3	Yayuk Basuki (INA)	6	3	6
Li Fang (CHN)	4	6	2
Chen Li (CHN)	6	7
4	Wang Shi-ting (TPE)	2	5
Tamarine Tanasugarn (THA)	2	2
2	Naoko Sawamatsu (JPN)	6	6

Semifinals
1	Kimiko Date (JPN)	6	5	6
3	Yayuk Basuki (INA)	0	7	0
Chen Li (CHN)	1	3
2	Naoko Sawamatsu (JPN)	6	6

Final
1	Kimiko Date (JPN)	6	6
2	Naoko Sawamatsu (JPN)	2	4
