= Taekwondo at the 1994 Asian Games =

Taekwondo competition

- Venue: Aki Ward Sports Center
- Dates: 8–9 October 1994

Taekwondo took place from October 8 to October 9 at the 1994 Asian Games in Aki Ward Sports Center, Hiroshima, Japan. Men's competitions held in eight weight categories for each. Each country was limited to having 4 athletes for the entire competition. South Korea topped the medal table by winning all four possible gold medals

== Medalists ==
Event	Gold	Silver	Bronze
Finweight (−50 kg)	Chang Jung-san; Chinese Taipei	Lugi Riyandi; Indonesia	Daisuke Hattori; Japan
Finweight (−50 kg)	Chang Jung-san; Chinese Taipei	Lugi Riyandi; Indonesia	Meneef Al-Deehani; Kuwait
Flyweight (−54 kg)	Jin Seung-tae; South Korea	Mohammad Sari Al-Zoabi; Jordan	Man Bahadur Shahi; Nepal
Flyweight (−54 kg)	Jin Seung-tae; South Korea	Mohammad Sari Al-Zoabi; Jordan	Mohammed Saddiq; Saudi Arabia
Bantamweight (−58 kg)	Trần Quang Hạ; Vietnam	Alfons Lung; Indonesia	Wong Ching Beng; Malaysia
Bantamweight (−58 kg)	Trần Quang Hạ; Vietnam	Alfons Lung; Indonesia	Hironobu Yamashita; Japan
Featherweight (−64 kg)	Kim Hyun-yong; South Korea	Robert Vargas; Philippines	Evgeniy Khan; Uzbekistan
Featherweight (−64 kg)	Kim Hyun-yong; South Korea	Robert Vargas; Philippines	Khalid Al-Shamrani; Saudi Arabia
Lightweight (−70 kg)	Fariborz Askari; Iran	Hiroyuki Yamashita; Japan	Rajendran Rajoo; Malaysia
Lightweight (−70 kg)	Fariborz Askari; Iran	Hiroyuki Yamashita; Japan	Yousef Abu Zaid; Jordan
Welterweight (−76 kg)	Jung Kwang-chae; South Korea	Ebrahim Saadati; Iran	Mitsushige Arita; Japan
Welterweight (−76 kg)	Jung Kwang-chae; South Korea	Ebrahim Saadati; Iran	Jeetender Kumar Rai; Malaysia
Middleweight (−83 kg)	Hamid Gholoum; Kuwait	Ammar Fahed Sbeihi; Jordan	Majid Amintorabi; Iran
Middleweight (−83 kg)	Hamid Gholoum; Kuwait	Ammar Fahed Sbeihi; Jordan	Andri Halim; Indonesia
Heavyweight (+83 kg)	Kim Je-kyoung; South Korea	Farzad Zarakhsh; Iran	Wu Pao-yi; Chinese Taipei
Heavyweight (+83 kg)	Kim Je-kyoung; South Korea	Farzad Zarakhsh; Iran	Tawfiq Nwaiser; Jordan

== Medal table ==
Rank	Nation	Gold	Silver	Bronze	Total
1	South Korea (KOR)	4	0	0	4
2	Iran (IRI)	1	2	1	4
3	Chinese Taipei (TPE)	1	0	1	2
3	Kuwait (KUW)	1	0	1	2
5	Vietnam (VIE)	1	0	0	1
6	Jordan (JOR)	0	2	2	4
7	Indonesia (INA)	0	2	1	3
8	Japan (JPN)	0	1	3	4
9	Philippines (PHI)	0	1	0	1
10	Malaysia (MAS)	0	0	3	3
11	Saudi Arabia (KSA)	0	0	2	2
12	Nepal (NEP)	0	0	1	1
12	Uzbekistan (UZB)	0	0	1	1
Totals (13 entries)		8	8	16	32
