= Skateboarding at the 2018 Asian Games – Men's park =

Men's park at the 2018 Asian Games
- Venue: Jakabaring Sport City
- Date: 28–29 August 2018
- Competitors: 10 from 6 nations

Medalists
gold medal	Kensuke Sasaoka	Japan
silver medal	Jason Dennis Lijnzaat	Indonesia
bronze medal	Pevi Permana Putra	Indonesia

The men's park competition at the 2018 Asian Games took place on 28 and 29 August at the JSC Skateboard Stadium.

== Schedule ==
All times are Western Indonesia Time (UTC+07:00)

Date	Time	Event
Tuesday, 28 August 2018	09:10	Preliminary
Wednesday, 29 August 2018	10:15	Final

== Results ==
=== Preliminary ===
Rank	Athlete	Run 1	Run 2	Run 3	Best
1	Kensuke Sasaoka (JPN)	80.33	83.66	68.00	83.66
2	Jason Dennis Lijnzaat (INA)	73.00	66.33	72.00	73.00
3	Pevi Permana Putra (INA)	66.66	63.66	62.66	66.66
4	Han Jae-jin (KOR)	49.66	63.33	52.66	63.33
5	Sun Kunkun (CHN)	60.66	52.66	57.33	60.66
6	Eugene Choi (KOR)	50.33	58.00	19.00	58.00
7	Noppakorn Panutai (THA)	44.00	53.00	57.66	57.66
8	Xiang Xiaojun (CHN)	50.33	30.66	51.33	51.33
9	Ian Nuriman Amri (MAS)	44.00	33.00	49.00	49.00
10	Pakorn Panutai (THA)	32.33	21.33	45.66	45.66

=== Final ===
Rank	Athlete	Run 1	Run 2	Run 3	Best
1st place, gold medalist(s)	Kensuke Sasaoka (JPN)	75.00	76.00	73.66	76.00
2nd place, silver medalist(s)	Jason Dennis Lijnzaat (INA)	66.33	68.33	65.66	68.33
3rd place, bronze medalist(s)	Pevi Permana Putra (INA)	63.66	67.00	61.66	67.00
4	Han Jae-jin (KOR)	64.66	66.33	65.66	66.33
5	Sun Kunkun (CHN)	60.00	55.00	41.00	60.00
6	Eugene Choi (KOR)	42.00	37.33	38.66	42.00
7	Xiang Xiaojun (CHN)	31.00	41.00	11.00	41.00
8	Noppakorn Panutai (THA)	15.00	10.00	20.33	20.33
