= Bowling at the 1994 Asian Games =

- Venue: Hiroden Bowl
- Dates: 5–11 October 1994

Bowling took place for the men's and women's individual, doubles, trios, and team events at the 1994 Asian Games in Hiroden Bowl, Hiroshima, Japan from October 5 to October 11.

== Medalists ==
=== Men ===
Event	Gold	Silver	Bronze
Singles	Lin Han-chen; Chinese Taipei	Hendro Pratono; Indonesia	Richard Phua; Malaysia
Doubles	Japan; Kengo Tagata; Hiroshi Yamamoto	South Korea; Min Cheol-ki; Seo Kook	United Arab Emirates; Faraj Al-Marri; Mohammed Al-Qubaisi
Trios	Japan; Kengo Tagata; Hiroshi Yamamoto; Kosaku Tatemoto	South Korea; Min Cheol-ki; Seo Kook; Byun Ho-jin	United Arab Emirates; Faraj Al-Marri; Mohammed Al-Ghazal; Mohammed Al-Qubaisi
Team of 5	South Korea; Min Cheol-ki; Seo Kook; Lee Yun-jae; Byun Ho-jin; Kim Sung-joo; Lee Jae-ho	Philippines; Jorge Fernandez; Paeng Nepomuceno; Rene Reyes; Paulo Valdez; Angelo Constantino	Japan; Kengo Tagata; Hiroshi Yamamoto; Nobuyuki Takahama; Kosei Wada; Kosaku Tatemoto
All-events	Kengo Tagata; Japan	Mohammed Al-Qubaisi; United Arab Emirates	Min Cheol-ki; South Korea
Masters	Hiroshi Yamamoto; Japan	Tsai Chun-lin; Chinese Taipei	Saeed Al-Hajri; Qatar

=== Women ===
Event	Gold	Silver	Bronze
Singles	Kim Sook-young; South Korea	Noriko Inauchi; Japan	Grace Young; Singapore
Doubles	South Korea; Kim Sook-young; Kim Young-sim	Malaysia; Lydia Kwah; Shirley Chow	Japan; Tomomi Shibata; Naoko Sekine
Trios	Malaysia; Lydia Kwah; Shirley Chow; Shalin Zulkifli	Japan; Atsuko Asai; Noriko Inauchi; Kumiko Inatsu	South Korea; Kim Sook-young; Kim Min-jung; Lee Ji-yeon
Team of 5	Chinese Taipei; Chen Ling-i; Weng Feng-ying; Chiu Shu-mei; Yang Lin-hua; Chou Miao-lin	Japan; Atsuko Asai; Noriko Inauchi; Tomomi Shibata; Naoko Sekine; Kumiko Inatsu	South Korea; Kim Sook-young; Kim Young-sim; Kim Min-jung; Kim Sung-hee; Lee Ji-yeon; Kim Min-soo
All-events	Shalin Zulkifli; Malaysia	Kim Sook-young; South Korea	Lydia Kwah; Malaysia
Masters	Lee Ji-yeon; South Korea	Kim Sook-young; South Korea	Irene Garcia; Philippines

== Medal table ==
Rank	Nation	Gold	Silver	Bronze	Total
1	South Korea (KOR)	4	4	3	11
2	Japan (JPN)	4	3	2	9
3	Malaysia (MAS)	2	1	2	5
4	Chinese Taipei (TPE)	2	1	0	3
5	United Arab Emirates (UAE)	0	1	2	3
6	Philippines (PHI)	0	1	1	2
7	Indonesia (INA)	0	1	0	1
8	Qatar (QAT)	0	0	1	1
8	Singapore (SIN)	0	0	1	1
Totals (9 entries)		12	12	12	36
