= Pencak silat at the 2018 Asian Games – Women's tunggal =

Women's tunggal at the 2018 Asian Games
- Venue: Padepokan Pencak Silat
- Dates: 25–27 August 2018
- Competitors: 8 from 8 nations

Medalists
gold medal	Puspa Arumsari	Indonesia
silver medal	Nurzuhairah Yazid	Singapore
bronze medal	Cherry May Regalado	Philippines

The women's tunggal (single) seni competition at the 2018 Asian Games took place from 25 to 27 August 2018 at Padepokan Pencak Silat, Taman Mini Indonesia Indah, Jakarta, Indonesia.

== Schedule ==
All times are Western Indonesia Time (UTC+07:00)

Date	Time	Event
Saturday, 25 August 2018	09:00	Preliminary
Monday, 27 August 2018	09:00	Final

== Results ==
=== Preliminary ===
==== Group A ====
Rank	Athlete	Score
1	Tunee Vilaysack (LAO)	455
2	Vương Thị Bình (VIE)	447
2	Cherry May Regalado (PHI)	447
4	Norshahirah Ratius (MAS)	440

==== Group B ====
Rank	Athlete	Score
1	Puspa Arumsari (INA)	465
2	Salini Mamu (THA)	459
3	Nurzuhairah Yazid (SGP)	441
4	Norleyermah Hj Raya (BRU)	437

=== Final ===
Rank	Athlete	Score
1st place, gold medalist(s)	Puspa Arumsari (INA)	467
2nd place, silver medalist(s)	Nurzuhairah Yazid (SGP)	445
3rd place, bronze medalist(s)	Cherry May Regalado (PHI)	444
4	Tunee Vilaysack (LAO)	443
5	Salini Mamu (THA)	438
6	Vương Thị Bình (VIE)	434
