= Pan Bing =

Chinese tennis player

Pan Bing 潘兵
- Country (sports): China
- Born: 13 February 1970 (age 56) Hubei, China
- Height: 1.85 m (6 ft 1 in)
- Plays: Right-handed
- Prize money: US$59,368

Singles
- Career record: 7-17
- Highest ranking: No. 176 (8 May 1995)

Doubles
- Career record: 3-11
- Highest ranking: No. 261 (27 February 1995)
Medal record
Men's tennis
Representing China
Asian Games
Gold medal – first place	1990 Beijing	Singles
Gold medal – first place	1990 Beijing	Team
Gold medal – first place	1994 Hiroshima	Singles
Silver medal – second place	1990 Beijing	Doubles
Bronze medal – third place	1994 Hiroshima	Doubles
- Last updated on: 8 February 2012.

Pan Bing (Chinese: 潘兵; born February 13, 1970) is a Chinese tennis player. He won 1990 and 1994 Men's singles gold medal in Asian Games, making him the only tennis player who could win singles gold medal twice.

== Grand Slam tournaments Performance timeline ==
Key
W	F	SF	QF	#R	RR	Q#	DNQ	A	NH

(W) winner; (F) finalist; (SF) semifinalist; (QF) quarterfinalist; (#R) rounds 4, 3, 2, 1; (RR) round-robin stage; (Q#) qualification round; (DNQ) did not qualify; (A) absent; (NH) not held; (SR) strike rate (events won / competed); (W–L) win–loss record.

=== Singles ===
Tournaments	1994	1995	1996	SR	W–L	Win %
Australian Open	A	Q2	Q1	0 / 0	0–0	–
French Open	A	Q1	A	0 / 0	0–0	–
Wimbledon	A	A	A	0 / 0	0–0	–
US Open	Q1	Q1	A	0 / 0	0–0	–
Win–loss	0–0	0–0	0–0	0 / 0	0–0	–

== See also ==
- Tennis in China
