= Archery at the 1962 Asian Games =

Archery was contested as an exhibition sport at the 1962 Asian Games in Persija Football Stadium, Jakarta, Indonesia from 28 August to 1 September 1962.

A total of 21 archers from 3 nations competed at the games, Japan won two gold medals while Indonesia won the other gold medal.

== Medalists ==
Event	Gold	Silver	Bronze
Men's individual	Minoru Sueda; Japan	Hiroyuki Yamamoto; Japan	Keiji Kishino; Japan
Men's team	Japan; Minoru Sueda; Hiroyuki Yamamoto; Keiji Kishino	Indonesia; A. Bachrumsjah; Harsono; H. Hadian	Philippines; Jose Tabora; Regino Masias; R. Nuguid
Women's individual	Rachmah; Indonesia	H. Hadian; Indonesia	Z. I. Osman; Indonesia

== Medal table ==
Rank	Nation	Gold	Silver	Bronze	Total
1	Japan (JPN)	2	1	1	4
2	Indonesia (INA)	1	2	1	4
3	Philippines (PHI)	0	0	1	1
Totals (3 entries)		3	3	3	9

== Participating nations ==
A total of 21 athletes from 3 nations competed in archery at the 1962 Asian Games:

- Indonesia (15)
- Japan (3)
- Philippines (3)
