= Asif Ismail =

Indian tennis player (born 1970)

Asif Ismail (born 30 September 1970) is a former tennis player who has the rare distinction of representing two countries in the Davis Cup, first India and later Hong Kong.

== Career ==
Ismail won the singles title in the national championship in 1993 defeating Vasudeva Reddy 3–6, 6–3, 6–2, 2–6, 8–6 in the final.

=== Representing India ===
Despite never winning a tour singles match above Satellite level , Ismail played two singles matches for India in a 1994 World Group Play-off tie against South Africa. He lost the two live rubbers both in straight sets, to South African No. 1 Wayne Ferreira and Marcos Ondruska.

The next month Ismail won the Asian Games tennis tournament. He reached his highest ATP singles ranking in December 1995, when he became World No. 412. His best tour result was reaching the quarter-finals of the Challenger event in Goa in late October 1995. He competed in the main draw of an ATP Tour event once, in doubles at the 1996 India Open. He and partner Gaurav Natekar, a wild-card entry, lost in the first round to the No. 1 seeds Byron Black and Sandon Stolle, 4–6, 5–7.

Ismail received the Arjuna award, the biggest sports-related award in India, in 1997.

=== Representing Hong Kong ===
Ismail represented Hong Kong in a 2003 Davis Cup Asia/Oceania Zone Group II tie versus Tajikistan. He played in 3 matches, winning his two live rubbers, as Hong Kong defeated Tajikistan 4–1. He again teamed with John Hui to compete in the doubles rubber the following year versus the Philippines in a group play-off tie, but the pair lost in straight sets as Hong Kong fell, 1–4.

== Post-playing career ==
During the 2006 season, Ismail had his debut as a coach in Grand Slam tournaments, coaching Sania Mirza during the French Open and Wimbledon.

Ismail currently teaches at the Aberdeen Marina Club in Hong Kong, which is managed by Peter Burwash International (see Peter Burwash). He coaches groups from beginners to advanced, and is one of the best in HK. His fellow coaches at the AMC are, Avinash Advani, Katalin Bulcsu, J.D. Shade, and Luis Gracia. He teaches groups from beginner to advanced. He coached the AMC team to the 16 and under prince cup. The team included Kabir Laroia, Oliver Kilpatrick, Dhruv Malhotra, Jackie Tang, Claire Spackman, Caroline Jensen, Rehan Haider, Nicolas Fuchs, Amaan Ismail and more.
