= Puspa Arumsari =

Indonesian pencak silat practitioner (born 1993)

- Born: 10 March 1993 (age 33); Jakarta, Indonesia
- Nationality: Indonesian
- Height: 163 cm (5 ft 4 in)
- Weight: 54 kg (119 lb; 8 st 7 lb)
- Style: Pencak silat

Puspa Arumsari (born 10 March 1993) is an Indonesian pencak silat practitioner. She is a gold medalist at the 2016 Pencak Silat World Championship which was coincidentally held in Indonesia. Puspa represented Indonesia at the 2018 Asian Games and claimed gold medal in the women's individual tunggal event where Pencak silat was one of the newest sports to be introduced at the 2018 Asian Games. This became Indonesia's first Asian Games gold medal in its own martial art, pencak silat.

== Achievements ==
International Games / Tournaments
Year	Venue	Event	Result	Games / Tournaments
2014	Palembang, Indonesia	Women's single	(gold) Gold	ASEAN University Games
2015	Kuala Lumpur, Malaysia	Women's single	(silver) Silver	Malaysia Open
2015	Phuket, Thailand	Women's single	(silver) Silver	16th World Pencak Silat Championships
2016	Denpasar, Indonesia	Women's single	(gold) Gold	17th World Pencak Silat Championships
2017	Kuala Lumpur, Malaysia	Women's single	(bronze) Bronze	Southeast Asian Games
2018	Jakarta, Indonesia	Women's single	(gold) Gold	Asian Games
2019	Cheongju, South Korea	Women's single	(bronze) Bronze	World Martial Arts Masterships
2019	Antwerp, Belgium	Women's single	(gold) Gold	Belgium Open
2019	Subic Bay, Philippines	Women's single	(gold) Gold	Southeast Asian Games
2022	Hanoi, Vietnam	Women's single	(silver) Silver	Southeast Asian Games
2022	Melaka, Malaysia	Women's single	(gold) Gold	19th World Pencak Silat Championships
2022	Melaka, Malaysia	Women's solo creative	(silver) Silver	19th World Pencak Silat Championships
2023	Phnom Penh, Cambodia	Women's single	(gold) Gold	Southeast Asian Games
