= Ryuso Tsujino =

Japanese tennis player (born 1969)

- Country (sports): Japan
- Born: 24 February 1969 (age 57) Osaka, Japan
- Height: 5 ft 9 in (175 cm)
- Plays: Right-handed (one-handed backhand)
- Prize money: $76,990

Singles
- Career record: 2–11
- Career titles: 0
- Highest ranking: No. 354 (18 October 1993)

Grand Slam singles results
- Australian Open: 1R (1994)

Doubles
- Career record: 4–9
- Career titles: 0
- Highest ranking: No. 380 (27 July 1998)
Medal record
Asian Games
Silver medal – second place	1994 Hiroshima	Mixed Doubles
Bronze medal – third place	1994 Hiroshima	Men's Team

Ryuso Tsujino (辻野 隆三, Tsujino Ryūsō; born 24 February 1969) is a former professional tennis player from Japan.

== Tennis career ==
Tsujino twice made the second round of the Tokyo Indoor tournament, in 1990 when he defeated Joey Rive and 1993 when he had a win over Patrik Kühnen.

In the 1994 Australian Open, his only Grand Slam appearance, Tsujino lost in the opening round to Brent Larkham. Also that year he was a mixed doubles silver medalist at the Asian Games in Hiroshima, partnering Nana Miyagi.

In 1996 Tsujino and his partner Tommy Shinada won the professional USTA Capital Eye Center Masters Classic men's doubles title at Forest Meadows.

Tsujino played in five Davis Cup ties for Japan between 1992 and 1995. His two wins were both in doubles, with Thomas Shimada, against the Chinese and Filipino pairings.

== Performance timeline ==
Key
W	F	SF	QF	#R	RR	Q#	DNQ	A	NH

(W) winner; (F) finalist; (SF) semifinalist; (QF) quarterfinalist; (#R) rounds 4, 3, 2, 1; (RR) round-robin stage; (Q#) qualification round; (DNQ) did not qualify; (A) absent; (NH) not held; (SR) strike rate (events won / competed); (W–L) win–loss record.

=== Singles ===
Tournament	1994	SR	W–L	Win %
Grand Slam tournaments
Australian Open		0 / 0	0–0	–
French Open		0 / 0	0–0	–
Wimbledon		0 / 0	0–0	–
US Open		0 / 0	0–0	–
Win–loss	0–0	0 / 0	0–0	–

== Personal life ==
Tsujino is married to Japanese actress and singer Yōko Oginome.
