= Tennis at the 1994 Asian Games =

- Venue: Regional Park Tennis Stadium
- Dates: 3–13 October 1994
- Nations: 14

Tennis were contested at the 1994 Asian Games in Regional Park Tennis Stadium, Hiroshima, Japan from 3 to 13 October 1994. Tennis had team, doubles, and singles events for men and women, as well as a mixed doubles competition.

Japan finished first in the medal table winning three gold medals.

== Medalists ==
Event	Gold	Silver	Bronze
Men's singles	Pan Bing; China	Yoon Yong-il; South Korea	Leander Paes; India
Men's singles	Pan Bing; China	Yoon Yong-il; South Korea	Benny Wijaya; Indonesia
Men's doubles	India; Leander Paes; Gaurav Natekar	South Korea; Chang Eui-jong; Kim Chi-wan	Indonesia; Donny Susetyo; Teddy Tandjung
Men's doubles	India; Leander Paes; Gaurav Natekar	South Korea; Chang Eui-jong; Kim Chi-wan	China; Pan Bing; Xia Jiaping
Men's team	India; Zeeshan Ali; Asif Ismail; Gaurav Natekar; Leander Paes	Indonesia; Donny Susetyo; Suwandi; Benny Wijaya; Bonit Wiryawan	Malaysia; Wilson Khoo; Adam Malik; Ramayah Ramachandran
Men's team	India; Zeeshan Ali; Asif Ismail; Gaurav Natekar; Leander Paes	Indonesia; Donny Susetyo; Suwandi; Benny Wijaya; Bonit Wiryawan	Japan; Satoshi Iwabuchi; Goichi Motomura; Ryuso Tsujino; Yasufumi Yamamoto
Women's singles	Kimiko Date; Japan	Naoko Sawamatsu; Japan	Yayuk Basuki; Indonesia
Women's singles	Kimiko Date; Japan	Naoko Sawamatsu; Japan	Chen Li; China
Women's doubles	Japan; Kyoko Nagatsuka; Ai Sugiyama	China; Li Fang; Chen Li	South Korea; Park Sung-hee; Choi Ju-yeon
Women's doubles	Japan; Kyoko Nagatsuka; Ai Sugiyama	China; Li Fang; Chen Li	Japan; Nana Miyagi; Mana Endo
Women's team	Japan; Mana Endo; Nana Miyagi; Naoko Sawamatsu; Ai Sugiyama	Indonesia; Yayuk Basuki; Natalia Soetrisno; Romana Tedjakusuma; Veronica Widyadharma	Chinese Taipei; Jane Chi; Ho Chiu-mei; Wang Shi-ting; Weng Tzu-ting
Women's team	Japan; Mana Endo; Nana Miyagi; Naoko Sawamatsu; Ai Sugiyama	Indonesia; Yayuk Basuki; Natalia Soetrisno; Romana Tedjakusuma; Veronica Widyadharma	China; Bi Ying; Chen Li; Li Fang; Yi Jingqian
Mixed doubles	China; Xia Jiaping; Li Fang	Japan; Ryuso Tsujino; Nana Miyagi	Japan; Goichi Motomura; Kyoko Nagatsuka
Mixed doubles	China; Xia Jiaping; Li Fang	Japan; Ryuso Tsujino; Nana Miyagi	South Korea; Chang Eui-jong; Choi Ju-yeon

== Medal table ==
Rank	Nation	Gold	Silver	Bronze	Total
1	Japan (JPN)	3	2	3	8
2	China (CHN)	2	1	3	6
3	India (IND)	2	0	1	3
4	Indonesia (INA)	0	2	3	5
5	South Korea (KOR)	0	2	2	4
6	Chinese Taipei (TPE)	0	0	1	1
6	Malaysia (MAS)	0	0	1	1
Totals (7 entries)		7	7	14	28

== Participating nations ==
- China
- Chinese Taipei
- India
- Indonesia
- Iran (4)
- Japan
- Kuwait
- Malaysia
- Oman
- Philippines
- South Korea
- Tajikistan
- Thailand
- Uzbekistan
