= Indonesia at the 1994 Asian Games =

- IOC code: INA
- NOC: Indonesian Olympic Committee
- Website: www.nocindonesia.or.id (in English)

in Hiroshima
- Medals Ranked 11th: Gold 3 Silver 12 Bronze 11 Total 26

Asian Games appearances (overview)
- 1951; 1954; 1958; 1962; 1966; 1970; 1974; 1978; 1982; 1986; 1990; 1994; 1998; 2002; 2006; 2010; 2014; 2018; 2022; 2026

Indonesia participated in the 1994 Asian Games held in the city of Hiroshima, Japan from 2 October to 16 October 1994. It ranked eleventh in medal count, with three gold medals, 12 silver medals, and 11 bronze medals in this edition of the Asiad.

== Medal summary ==
=== Medal table ===
Sport	Gold	Silver	Bronze	Total
Badminton	3	2	2	7
Karate	0	3	2	5
Tennis	0	2	3	5
Taekwondo	0	2	1	3
Weightlifting	0	1	1	2
Archery	0	1	0	1
Bowling	0	1	0	1
Boxing	0	0	2	2
Total	3	12	11	26

=== Medalists ===
Medal	Name	Sport	Event	Ref
Gold	Hariyanto Arbi; Rudy Gunawan; Rexy Mainaky; Ricky Subagja; Bambang Suprianto; Joko Suprianto; Hermawan Susanto; Ardy Wiranata	Badminton	Men's team	
Gold	Hariyanto Arbi	Badminton	Men's singles	
Gold	Ricky Subagja; Rexy Mainaky	Badminton	Men's doubles	
Silver	Dahliana; Rusena Gelanteh; Purnama Pandiangan	Archery	Women's team	
Silver	Joko Suprianto	Badminton	Men's singles	
Silver	Finarsih; Yuni Kartika; Eliza Nathanael; Ika Heny Nursanti; Zelin Resiana; Yuliani Santosa; Susi Susanti; Lili Tampi	Badminton	Women's team	
Silver	Hendro Pratono	Bowling	Men's singles	
Silver	Abdullah Kadir	Karate	Men's individual kata	
Silver	Meity Johana Kaseger	Karate	Women's kumite +60 kg	
Silver	Omita Olga Ompi	Karate	Women's individual Kata	
Silver	Lugi Riyandi	Taekwondo	Men's Finweight	
Silver	Alfons Lung	Taekwondo	Men's Bantamweight	
Silver	Donny Susetyo; Suwandi; Benny Wijaya; Bonit Wiryawan	Tennis	Men's team	
Silver	Yayuk Basuki; Natalia Soetrisno; Romana Tedjakusuma; Veronica Widyadharma	Tennis	Women's team	
Silver	Supeni Wasiman	Weightlifting	Women's −50 kg	
Bronze	Susi Susanti	Badminton	Women's singles	
Bronze	Rudy Gunawan; Eliza Nathanael	Badminton	Mixed doubles	
Bronze	Hermensen Ballo	Boxing	Men's −48 kg	
Bronze	Nemo Bahari	Boxing	Men's −57 kg	
Bronze	Nurosi Nurasjati	Karate	Women's kumite −53 kg	
Bronze	Nilawati Daud	Karate	Women's kumite −60 kg	
Bronze	Andri Halim	Taekwondo	Men's Middleweight	
Bronze	Benny Wijaya	Tennis	Men's singles	
Bronze	Donny Susetyo; Teddy Tandjung	Tennis	Men's doubles	
Bronze	Yayuk Basuki	Tennis	Women's singles	
Bronze	Patmawati Abdul Hamid	Weightlifting	Women's −54 kg	
