= Gaurav Natekar =

Indian tennis player (born 1972)

Gaurav Natekar (born 4 April 1972) is a seven-time Indian National Tennis Champion. He was awarded the Arjuna Award in 1996 for Tennis.

His wife, Arati Ponnappa, was also a national level tennis player. Gaurav Natekar and Arati Ponnappa Natekar have founded a Sports Consultancy Firm in Pune.

Gaurav's father, Nandu M. Natekar, was a national-level Indian badminton champion.

== Achievements ==
- Represented the country in Davis Cup from 1992 to 1997. Was member of the team that reached the semi-final in '93
- Double gold medallist at the Hiroshima Asian Games in 1994 (team event and doubles with Leander Paes)
- Double gold medallist in SAF Games in Colombo '93, Dhaka '95, and Madras '97.
- Won the National hard & grasscourt titles in singles and doubles in the same year (1992)
- Two National singles, seven doubles and five junior titles. Highest ATP ranking: singles 272, doubles 167.
