= Boxing at the 1962 Asian Games =

Boxing competitions

- Venue: Senayan Tennis Stadium
- Dates: 26–31 August 1962
- Competitors: 65 from 11 nations

The Boxing Tournament at the 1962 Asian Games was held at the Senayan Tennis Stadium (now known as Center Court) in Jakarta, Indonesia between 26 and 31 August 1962.

Barkat Ali of Pakistan won the heavyweight gold without a fight, due to the absence of his would-be opponent Chang Lo-pu from Taiwan. India's Padam Bahadur Mall was voted the best boxer at the Games.

== Schedule ==
R	Round of 16	¼	Quarterfinals	½	Semifinals	F	Finals

Event↓/Date →	26th Sun	27th Mon	28th Tue	29th Wed	30th Thu	31st Fri
Men's 51 kg	R		¼		½	F
Men's 54 kg	R		¼		½	F
Men's 57 kg		¼			½	F
Men's 60 kg	R		¼		½	F
Men's 63.5 kg	¼	½				F
Men's 67 kg		¼			½	F
Men's 71 kg		¼			½	F
Men's 75 kg	½					F
Men's 81 kg	½					F
Men's +81 kg						F

== Medalists ==
Event	Gold	Silver	Bronze
Flyweight (51 kg)	Chung Shin-cho; South Korea	Masao Karasawa; Japan	Senarath Jayasuriya; Ceylon
Flyweight (51 kg)	Chung Shin-cho; South Korea	Masao Karasawa; Japan	Ghulam Sarwar; Pakistan
Bantamweight (54 kg)	Kiyoshi Tanabe; Japan	Frans Soplanit; Indonesia	Tin Tun; Burma
Bantamweight (54 kg)	Kiyoshi Tanabe; Japan	Frans Soplanit; Indonesia	Jose Ramirez; Philippines
Featherweight (57 kg)	Samphan Payonrathana; Thailand	Mamoru Hayashi; Japan	Egino Grafia; Philippines
Featherweight (57 kg)	Samphan Payonrathana; Thailand	Mamoru Hayashi; Japan	Than Tun; Burma
Lightweight (60 kg)	Padam Bahadur Mall; India	Kanemaru Shiratori; Japan	Catalino Arpon; Philippines
Lightweight (60 kg)	Padam Bahadur Mall; India	Kanemaru Shiratori; Japan	You Chin Hong; Cambodia
Light welterweight (63.5 kg)	Kim Deuk-bong; South Korea	Sukda Songsang; Thailand	Johnny Bolang; Indonesia
Light welterweight (63.5 kg)	Kim Deuk-bong; South Korea	Sukda Songsang; Thailand	Muhammad Sharif; Pakistan
Welterweight (67 kg)	Manfredo Alipala; Philippines	Kichijiro Hamada; Japan	Choi Song-keun; South Korea
Welterweight (67 kg)	Manfredo Alipala; Philippines	Kichijiro Hamada; Japan	Singto Jamjitman; Thailand
Light middleweight (71 kg)	Koji Masuda; Japan	Shin Yang-il; South Korea	Kumar Rai; Burma
Light middleweight (71 kg)	Koji Masuda; Japan	Shin Yang-il; South Korea	Buddy D'Souza; India
Middleweight (75 kg)	Kim Duk-pal; South Korea	Gul Muhammad; Pakistan	Alex Abast; Indonesia
Middleweight (75 kg)	Kim Duk-pal; South Korea	Gul Muhammad; Pakistan	Surendra Sarkar; India
Light heavyweight (81 kg)	Muhammad Safdar; Pakistan	Paruhum Siregar; Indonesia	Tetsuya Arita; Japan
Light heavyweight (81 kg)	Muhammad Safdar; Pakistan	Paruhum Siregar; Indonesia	None awarded
Heavyweight (+81 kg)	Barkat Ali; Pakistan	None awarded	None awarded
Heavyweight (+81 kg)	Barkat Ali; Pakistan	None awarded	None awarded

== Medal table ==
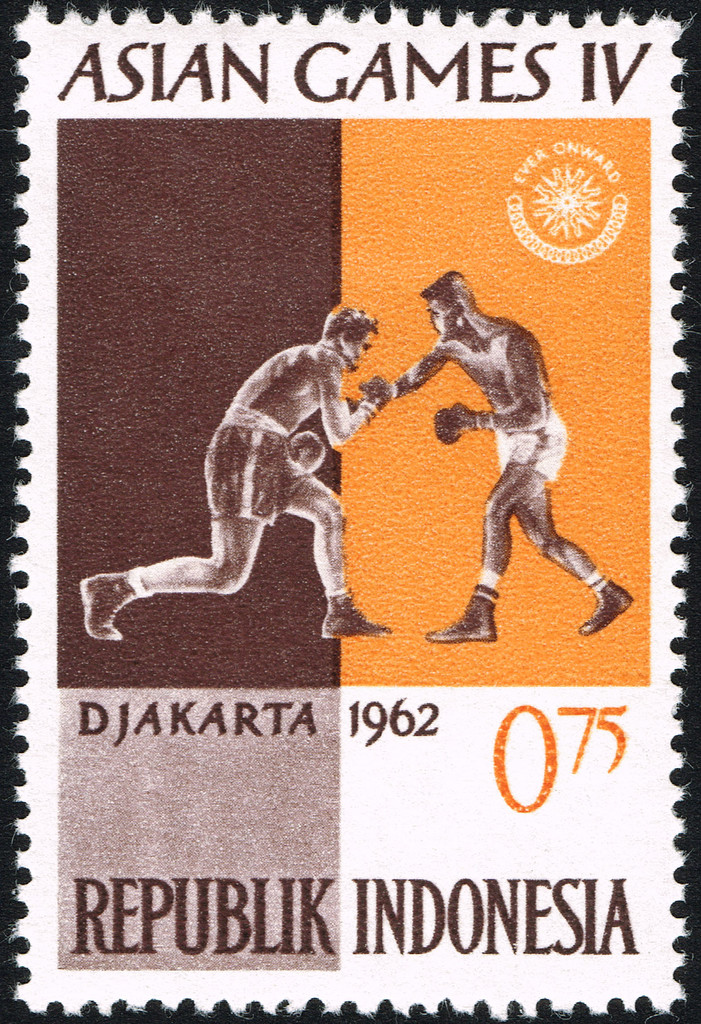
Boxing at the 1962 Asian Games on a stamp of Indonesia

Rank	Nation	Gold	Silver	Bronze	Total
1	South Korea (KOR)	3	1	1	5
2	Japan (JPN)	2	4	1	7
3	Pakistan (PAK)	2	1	2	5
4	Thailand (THA)	1	1	1	3
5	Philippines (PHI)	1	0	3	4
6	India (IND)	1	0	2	3
7	Indonesia (INA)	0	2	2	4
8	Burma (BIR)	0	0	3	3
9	Cambodia (CAM)	0	0	1	1
9	Ceylon (CEY)	0	0	1	1
Totals (10 entries)		10	9	17	36

== Participating nations ==
A total of 65 athletes from 11 nations competed in boxing at the 1962 Asian Games:

- Burma (4)
- Cambodia (5)
- Ceylon (2)
- India (3)
- Indonesia (9)
- Japan (8)
- Pakistan (10)
- Philippines (6)
- Singapore (3)
- South Korea (8)
- Thailand (7)
