= Boxing at the 1962 Asian Games – Men's 67 kg =

Boxing competitions

Men's 67 kg at the 1962 Asian Games
- Venue: Senayan Tennis Stadium
- Date: 27–31 August 1962
- Competitors: 6 from 6 nations

Medalists
gold medal	Manfredo Alipala	Philippines
silver medal	Kichijiro Hamada	Japan
bronze medal	Choi Song-keun	South Korea
bronze medal	Singto Jamjitman	Thailand

The men's welterweight (67 kilograms) event at the 1962 Asian Games took place from 27 to 31 August 1962 at Senayan Tennis Stadium, Jakarta, Indonesia.

== Schedule ==
All times are Western Indonesian Time (UTC+07:30)

Date	Time	Event
Monday, 27 August 1962	20:00	Quarterfinals
Thursday, 30 August 1962	20:00	Semifinals
Friday, 31 August 1962	20:00	Final

== Results ==
Legend

- PTS — Won by points

Quarterfinals
Singto Jamjitman (THA)	PTS
Bait Hussain (PAK)
Josef Latumahina (INA)
Manfredo Alipala (PHI)	PTS

Semifinals
Choi Song-keun (KOR)
Kichijiro Hamada (JPN)	PTS
Singto Jamjitman (THA)
Manfredo Alipala (PHI)	PTS

Final
Kichijiro Hamada (JPN)
Manfredo Alipala (PHI)	PTS
