= Boxing at the 1962 Asian Games – Men's 63.5 kg =

Boxing competitions

Men's 63.5 kg at the 1962 Asian Games
- Venue: Senayan Tennis Stadium
- Date: 26–31 August 1962
- Competitors: 7 from 7 nations

Medalists
gold medal	Kim Deuk-bong	South Korea
silver medal	Sukda Songsang	Thailand
bronze medal	Johnny Bolang	Indonesia
bronze medal	Muhammad Sharif	Pakistan

The men's light welterweight (63.5 kilograms) event at the 1962 Asian Games took place from 26 to 31 August 1962 at Senayan Tennis Stadium, Jakarta, Indonesia.

== Schedule ==
All times are Western Indonesian Time (UTC+07:30)

Date	Time	Event
Sunday, 26 August 1962	20:00	Quarterfinals
Monday, 27 August 1962	20:00	Semifinals
Friday, 31 August 1962	20:00	Final

== Results ==
Legend

- KO — Won by knockout
- PTS — Won by points

Quarterfinals
Johnny Bolang (INA)	PTS
Yasunobu Takada (JPN)
Sukda Songsang (THA)	KO
Sok Thell (CAM)
Antonio de la Cruz (PHI)
Muhammad Sharif (PAK)	PTS

Semifinals
Kim Deuk-bong (KOR)	PTS
Johnny Bolang (INA)
Sukda Songsang (THA)	PTS
Muhammad Sharif (PAK)

Final
Kim Deuk-bong (KOR)	PTS
Sukda Songsang (THA)
