= Boxing at the 1962 Asian Games – Men's 71 kg =

Boxing competitions

Men's 71 kg at the 1962 Asian Games
- Venue: Senayan Tennis Stadium
- Date: 27–31 August 1962
- Competitors: 7 from 7 nations

Medalists
gold medal	Koji Masuda	Japan
silver medal	Shin Yang-il	South Korea
bronze medal	Kumar Rai	Burma
bronze medal	Buddy D'Souza	India

The men's light middleweight (71 kilograms) event at the 1962 Asian Games took place from 27 to 31 August 1962 at Senayan Tennis Stadium, Jakarta, Indonesia.

== Schedule ==
All times are Western Indonesian Time (UTC+07:30)

Date	Time	Event
Monday, 27 August 1962	20:00	Quarterfinals
Thursday, 30 August 1962	20:00	Semifinals
Friday, 31 August 1962	20:00	Final

== Results ==
Legend

- PTS — Won by points

Quarterfinals
Koji Masuda (JPN)	PTS
Sutep Suttiwudi (THA)
Buddy D'Souza (IND)	PTS
Firman Pasaribu (INA)
Shin Yang-il (KOR)	PTS
Sultan Mahmood (PAK)

Semifinals
Kumar Rai (BIR)
Koji Masuda (JPN)	PTS
Buddy D'Souza (IND)
Shin Yang-il (KOR)	PTS

Final
Koji Masuda (JPN)	PTS
Shin Yang-il (KOR)
