= Wrestling at the 1962 Asian Games – Men's freestyle 57 kg =

Men's freestyle 57 kg at the 1962 Asian Games
- Venue: Ikada Sports Hall
- Dates: 28–30 August 1962
- Competitors: 7 from 7 nations

Medalists
gold medal	Tadashi Asai	Japan
silver medal	Siraj Din	Pakistan
bronze medal	Choi Young-kil	South Korea

The men's freestyle 57 kilograms (bantamweight) freestyle wrestling competition at the 1962 Asian Games in Jakarta was held from 28 to 30 August 1962.

The competition used a form of negative points tournament, with negative points given for any result short of a fall. Accumulation of 6 negative points eliminated the wrestler. When three or fewer wrestlers remained, they advanced to a final round, with only preliminary results amongst them carried forward.

== Schedule ==
All times are Western Indonesian Time (UTC+07:30)

Date	Time	Event
Tuesday, 28 August 1962	08:00	1st round
Wednesday, 29 August 1962	08:00	2nd round
Wednesday, 29 August 1962	14:30	3rd round
Thursday, 30 August 1962	08:00	4th round
Thursday, 30 August 1962	14:30	5th round

== Results ==
=== 1st round ===
TBM		BM		BM		TBM
1	Tadashi Asai (JPN)	1	Decision	3	Siraj Din (PAK)	3
0	Ghulam Hazrat (AFG)	0	Fall 8:39	4	Enrique Lambatan (PHI)	4
4	Wirjanta (INA)	4	Fall 2:40	0	Choi Young-kil (KOR)	0
0	Narin Ghume (IND)				Bye	

=== 2nd round ===
TBM		BM		BM		TBM
3	Narin Ghume (IND)	3	Decision	1	Tadashi Asai (JPN)	2
4	Siraj Din (PAK)	1	Decision	3	Ghulam Hazrat (AFG)	3
5	Enrique Lambatan (PHI)	1	Decision	3	Wirjanta (INA)	7
0	Choi Young-kil (KOR)				Bye	

=== 3rd round ===
TBM		BM		BM		TBM
1	Choi Young-kil (KOR)	1	Decision	3	Narin Ghume (IND)	6
3	Tadashi Asai (JPN)	1	Decision	3	Ghulam Hazrat (AFG)	6
4	Siraj Din (PAK)	0	Fall 4:41	4	Enrique Lambatan (PHI)	9

=== 4th round ===
TBM		BM		BM		TBM
4	Choi Young-kil (KOR)	3	Decision	1	Tadashi Asai (JPN)	4
4	Siraj Din (PAK)				Bye	

=== 5th round ===
TBM		BM		BM		TBM
6	Siraj Din (PAK)	2	Draw	2	Choi Young-kil (KOR)	6
4	Tadashi Asai (JPN)				Bye	

== Final standing ==
Rank	Athlete	Round					TBM	FBM
Rank	Athlete	1	2	3	4	5	TBM	FBM
1st place, gold medalist(s)	Tadashi Asai (JPN)	1	1	1	1	Bye	4	2
2nd place, silver medalist(s)	Siraj Din (PAK)	3	1	0	Bye	2	6	5 (Note: Tied on head-to-head result and total bad marks. The athletes' body weights were used as the tiebreaker.)
3rd place, bronze medalist(s)	Choi Young-kil (KOR)	0	Bye	1	3	2	6	5
4	Ghulam Hazrat (AFG)	0	3	3			6	
5	Narin Ghume (IND)	Bye	3	3			6	
6	Enrique Lambatan (PHI)	4	1	4			9	
7	Wirjanta (INA)	4	3				7	
