= Boxing at the 1962 Asian Games – Men's 57 kg =

Boxing competitions

Men's 57 kg at the 1962 Asian Games
- Venue: Senayan Tennis Stadium
- Date: 27–31 August 1962
- Competitors: 8 from 8 nations

Medalists
gold medal	Samphan Payonrathana	Thailand
silver medal	Mamoru Hayashi	Japan
bronze medal	Egino Grafia	Philippines
bronze medal	Than Tun	Burma

The men's featherweight (57 kilograms) event at the 1962 Asian Games took place from 27 to 31 August 1962 at Senayan Tennis Stadium, Jakarta, Indonesia.

== Schedule ==
All times are Western Indonesian Time (UTC+07:30)

Date	Time	Event
Monday, 27 August 1962	20:00	Quarterfinals
Thursday, 30 August 1962	20:00	Semifinals
Friday, 31 August 1962	20:00	Final

== Results ==
Legend

- PTS — Won by points

Quarterfinals
Mumtaz Ali (PAK)
Egino Grafia (PHI)	PTS
Mamoru Hayashi (JPN)	PTS
Mao Sokhan (CAM)
Than Tun (BIR)	PTS
Suparlan (INA)
Kwon Kyoo-shik (KOR)
Samphan Payonrathana (THA)	PTS

Semifinals
Egino Grafia (PHI)
Mamoru Hayashi (JPN)	PTS
Than Tun (BIR)
Samphan Payonrathana (THA)	PTS

Final
Mamoru Hayashi (JPN)
Samphan Payonrathana (THA)	PTS
