= Boxing at the 1962 Asian Games – Men's 60 kg =

Boxing competitions

Men's 60 kg at the 1962 Asian Games
- Venue: Senayan Tennis Stadium
- Date: 26–31 August 1962
- Competitors: 9 from 9 nations

Medalists
| gold medal | Padam Bahadur Mall | India |
| silver medal | Kanemaru Shiratori | Japan |
| bronze medal | Catalino Arpon | Philippines |
| bronze medal | You Chin Hong | Cambodia |

The men's lightweight (60 kilograms) event at the 1962 Asian Games took place from 26 to 31 August 1962 at Senayan Tennis Stadium, Jakarta, Indonesia.

== Schedule ==
All times are Western Indonesian Time (UTC+07:30)

| Date | Time | Event |
|---|---|---|
| Sunday, 26 August 1962 | 20:00 | First round |
| Tuesday, 28 August 1962 | 20:00 | Quarterfinals |
| Thursday, 30 August 1962 | 20:00 | Semifinals |
| Friday, 31 August 1962 | 20:00 | Final |

== Results ==
Legend

- KO — Won by knockout
- PTS — Won by points

First round
Ghulam Sarwar (PAK) | PTS
Austin Dunsford (SIN)

Quarterfinals
Catalino Arpon (PHI) | PTS
Niyon Prasertson (THA)
Kanemaru Shiratori (JPN) | KO
Masduki (INA)
You Chin Hong (CAM) | PTS
Cho Pil-kyo (KOR)
Padam Bahadur Mall (IND) | PTS
Ghulam Sarwar (PAK)

Semifinals
Catalino Arpon (PHI)
Kanemaru Shiratori (JPN) | PTS
You Chin Hong (CAM)
Padam Bahadur Mall (IND) | PTS

Final
Kanemaru Shiratori (JPN)
Padam Bahadur Mall (IND) | PTS
