= Boxing at the 1962 Asian Games – Men's 54 kg =

Boxing competitions

Men's 54 kg at the 1962 Asian Games
- Venue: Senayan Tennis Stadium
- Date: 26–31 August 1962
- Competitors: 10 from 10 nations

Medalists
gold medal	Kiyoshi Tanabe	Japan
silver medal	Frans Soplanit	Indonesia
bronze medal	Tin Tun	Burma
bronze medal	Jose Ramirez	Philippines

The men's bantamweight (54 kilograms) event at the 1962 Asian Games took place from 26 to 31 August 1962 at Senayan Tennis Stadium, Jakarta, Indonesia.

== Schedule ==
All times are Western Indonesian Time (UTC+07:30)

Date	Time	Event
Sunday, 26 August 1962	20:00	First round
Tuesday, 28 August 1962	20:00	Quarterfinals
Thursday, 30 August 1962	20:00	Semifinals
Friday, 31 August 1962	20:00	Final

== Results ==
Legend

- DSQ — Won by disqualification
- PTS — Won by points
- TKO — Won by technical knockout

First round
Kiyoshi Tanabe (JPN)	PTS
Park Hi-do (KOR)
Somchai Boonjong (THA)	PTS
Brian Isaac (SIN)

Quarterfinals
Tin Tun (BIR)	PTS
Khieu Soeun (CAM)
Sher Zaman (PAK)
Frans Soplanit (INA)	DSQ
Jose Ramirez (PHI)	PTS
Polwatte Gallace Neil (CEY)
Kiyoshi Tanabe (JPN)	PTS
Somchai Boonjong (THA)

Semifinals
Tin Tun (BIR)
Frans Soplanit (INA)	PTS
Jose Ramirez (PHI)
Kiyoshi Tanabe (JPN)	TKO

Final
Frans Soplanit (INA)
Kiyoshi Tanabe (JPN)	PTS
