= Boxing at the 1962 Asian Games – Men's 51 kg =

Boxing competitions

Men's 51 kg at the 1962 Asian Games
- Venue: Senayan Tennis Stadium
- Date: 26–31 August 1962
- Competitors: 10 from 10 nations

Medalists
gold medal	Chung Shin-cho	South Korea
silver medal	Masao Karasawa	Japan
bronze medal	Senarath Jayasuriya	Ceylon
bronze medal	Ghulam Sarwar	Pakistan

The men's flyweight (51 kilograms) event at the 1962 Asian Games took place from 26 to 31 August 1962 at Senayan Tennis Stadium, Jakarta, Indonesia.

== Schedule ==
All times are Western Indonesian Time (UTC+07:30)

Date	Time	Event
Sunday, 26 August 1962	20:00	First round
Tuesday, 28 August 1962	20:00	Quarterfinals
Thursday, 30 August 1962	20:00	Semifinals
Friday, 31 August 1962	20:00	Final

== Results ==
Legend

- PTS — Won by points
- WO — Won by walkover

First round
Chung Shin-cho (KOR)	PTS
Van Pho (CAM)
Abidin (INA)	PTS
Suratin Meepraseart (THA)

Quarterfinals
Senarath Jayasuriya (CEY)	PTS
Hla Nyunt (BIR)
Masao Karasawa (JPN)	PTS
Gregorio Rimarin (PHI)
Ghulam Sarwar (PAK)	PTS
Jumaat Ibrahim (SIN)
Chung Shin-cho (KOR)	PTS
Abidin (INA)

Semifinals
Senarath Jayasuriya (CEY)
Masao Karasawa (JPN)	PTS
Ghulam Sarwar (PAK)
Chung Shin-cho (KOR)	WO

Final
Masao Karasawa (JPN)
Chung Shin-cho (KOR)	PTS
