= India at the Asian Games =

- IOC code: IND
- NOC: Indian Olympic Association
- Medals Ranked 5th: Gold 204 Silver 265 Bronze 394 Total 863

Summer appearances
- 1951; 1954; 1958; 1962; 1966; 1970; 1974; 1978; 1982; 1986; 1990; 1994; 1998; 2002; 2006; 2010; 2014; 2018; 2022; 2026

Winter appearances
- 1986; 1990; 1996; 1999; 2003; 2007; 2011; 2017; 2025; 2029

India is a member of the Olympic Council of Asia (OCA). In 1949, India was one of the founding members of the Asian Games Federation (replaced by the OCA in 1981), and hosted the first Asian Games in 1951 at New Delhi. The nation has participated in every Asian Games since its inception. India's best performance came in the 2022 Asian Games where the country finished fourth in the medal table with 106 medals.

== Background ==
The Indian Olympic Association (IOA) was established in 1927 and recognised by the International Olympic Committee in the same year. India was one of the founding members of the Asian Games Federation (AGF), established on 13 February 1949. On 26 November 1981, the Olympic Council of Asia (OCA) replaced the AGF, and the IOA, the National Olympic Committee of India,^{[a]} became the member of OCA.

India hosted the first Asian Games in 1951 at New Delhi. The 2026 Asian Games was India's 20th consecutive appearance at the Asian Games. The country's best performance came in the 2023 Asian Games at Hangzhou where the country finished fourth in the medal table with 106 medals including 28 gold, 38 silver, 40 bronze medals.

Apart from the Asian Games, India participates in the other continental level multi-sport events organised by the OCA including the Asian Winter Games, Asian Indoor-Martial Arts Games, Asian Beach Games, and Asian Youth Games. The Indoor and Martial Arts were amalgamated into a single event since 2013. Being a member of South Asian Zone, India also participates in the South Asian Games, sub-regional Games for South Asia.

== Host ==
India has hosted the Asian Games twice, the inaugural edition in 1951 and the 1982 Asian Games, both at New Delhi.

== Medal table ==
India is one of seven NOCs (along with Indonesia, Japan, the Philippines, Sri Lanka, Singapore and Thailand) that have competed in all editions of the Asian Games. India has won at least one gold medal at every edition, the only NOC other than Japan to achieve this feat.

* Red border indicates that the Games was hosted by India.

Games	Host	Rank	(gold) Gold	(silver) Silver	(bronze) Bronze	Total	Athletes
1951 New Delhi	India	2	15	16	20	51	151
1954 Manila	Philippines	5	5	4	8	17	69
1958 Tokyo	Japan	7	5	4	4	13	79
1962 Jakarta	Indonesia	3	10	13	10	33	74
1966 Bangkok	Thailand	5	7	3	11	21	259
1970 Bangkok	Thailand	5	6	9	10	25	177
1974 Tehran	Iran	7	4	12	12	28	155
1978 Bangkok	Thailand	6	11	11	6	28	283
1982 New Delhi	India	5	13	19	25	57	828
1986 Seoul	South Korea	5	5	9	23	37	300
1990 Beijing	China	11	1	8	14	23	195
1994 Hiroshima	Japan	8	4	3	16	23	146
1998 Bangkok	Thailand	9	7	11	17	35	328
2002 Busan	South Korea	7	11	12	13	36	356
2006 Doha	Qatar	8	10	17	26	53	387
2010 Guangzhou	China	6	14	17	34	65	626
2014 Incheon	South Korea	8	11	9	37	57	515
2018 Jakarta–Palembang	Indonesia	8	16	23	31	70	570
2022 Hangzhou	China	4	28	38	40	106	661
2026 Aichi–Nagoya	Japan	4	21	27	37	85	495
2030 Doha	Qatar	Future event					
2034 Riyadh	Saudi Arabia	Future event					
Total		5	204	265	394	863	6,654

- Gold
- Silver
- Bronze

== Medals by sport ==
=== Summary ===
Note: Updated as of 2026 edition

Sport	Rank	(gold) Gold	(silver) Silver	(bronze) Bronze	Total
Archery	2	11	8	9	28
Athletics	3	86	111	110	307
Badminton	7	1	2	11	14
Boxing	8	12	17	38	67
Bridge	4	1	1	2	4
Canoeing	11	0	0	2	2
Chess	2	2	2	2	6
Cricket	1	4	0	0	4
Cue sports	3	5	4	6	15
Cycling	17	0	1	2	3
Diving	3	2	1	2	5
Equestrian	4	4	3	7	14
Field hockey	3	7	11	7	25
Football	6	2	0	1	3
Golf	4	4	5	0	9
Gymnastics	15	0	0	1	1
Judo	17	0	0	5	5
Kabaddi	1	13	1	1	15
Kurash	5	0	1	2	3
Mixed martial arts	9	0	0	1	1
Roller sports	7	0	0	4	4
Rowing	7	2	7	20	29
Sailing	10	1	9	16	26
Sepaktakraw	12	0	0	3	3
Shooting	6	19	38	38	95
Squash	3	3	6	14	23
Soft tennis	7	0	0	1	1
Swimming	14	1	2	6	9
Table tennis	11	0	0	4	4
Taekwondo	24	0	0	1	1
Tennis	6	10	7	17	34
Volleyball	6	0	1	2	3
Water polo	5	1	1	1	3
Weightlifting	20	0	6	9	15
Wrestling	5	13	17	41	71
Wushu	14	0	3	8	11
Total	5	204	265	394	863

=== Archery ===
Games	Rank	Gold	Silver	Bronze	Total
2006 Doha	5	0	0	1	1
2010 Guangzhou	3	0	1	2	3
2014 Incheon	3	1	1	2	4
2018 Jakarta–Palembang	5	0	2	0	2
2022 Hangzhou	1	5	2	2	9
2026 Aichi–Nagoya	1	5	2	2	9
Total	2	11	8	9	28

=== Athletics ===
Games	Rank	Gold	Silver	Bronze	Total
1951 New Delhi	2	10	12	12	34
1954 Manila	2	5	3	6	14
1958 Tokyo	3	5	2	2	9
1962 Jakarta	2	5	5	4	14
1966 Bangkok	3	5	1	5	11
1970 Bangkok	2	4	5	5	14
1974 Tehran	3	4	7	4	15
1978 Bangkok	3	8	7	3	18
1982 New Delhi	3	4	9	8	21
1986 Seoul	4	4	2	3	9
1990 Beijing	8	0	4	2	6
1994 Hiroshima	10	0	1	2	3
1998 Bangkok	6	2	6	7	15
2002 Busan	2	7	6	4	17
2006 Doha	8	1	4	4	9
2010 Guangzhou	2	5	2	5	12
2014 Incheon	6	2	3	8	13
2018 Jakarta–Palembang	3	8	9	3	20
2022 Hangzhou	3	6	14	9	29
2026 Aichi–Nagoya	6	1	9	14	24
Total	3	86	111	110	307

=== Badminton ===
Games	Rank	Gold	Silver	Bronze	Total
1974 Tehran	4	0	0	1	1
1982 New Delhi	5	0	0	5	5
1986 Seoul	5	0	0	1	1
2014 Incheon	7	0	0	1	1
2018 Jakarta–Palembang	5	0	1	1	2
2022 Hangzhou	3	1	1	1	3
2026 Aichi–Nagoya	7	0	0	1	1
Total	7	1	2	11	14

=== Boxing ===
Games	Rank	Gold	Silver	Bronze	Total
1958 Tokyo	8	0	1	1	2
1962 Jakarta	6	1	0	2	3
1966 Bangkok	3	1	1	0	2
1970 Bangkok	4	1	1	0	2
1974 Tehran	5	0	3	2	5
1978 Bangkok	7	0	1	2	3
1982 New Delhi	3	1	2	3	6
1986 Seoul	2	0	4	5	9
1990 Beijing	11	0	0	1	1
1994 Hiroshima	11	0	0	4	4
1998 Bangkok	4	1	0	1	2
2006 Doha	10	0	0	2	2
2010 Guangzhou	2	2	3	4	9
2014 Incheon	4	1	0	4	5
2018 Jakarta–Palembang	4	1	0	1	2
2022 Hangzhou	10	0	1	3	4
2026 Aichi–Nagoya	1	3	0	3	6
Total	8	12	17	38	67

=== Bridge ===
Games	Rank	Gold	Silver	Bronze	Total
2018 Jakarta–Palembang	3	1	0	2	3
2022 Hangzhou	4	0	1	0	1
Total	4	1	1	2	4

=== Canoeing ===
Games	Rank	Gold	Silver	Bronze	Total
1994 Hiroshima	6	0	0	1	1
2022 Hangzhou	10	0	0	1	1
Total	11	0	0	2	2

=== Chess ===
Games	Rank	Gold	Silver	Bronze	Total
2006 Doha	1	2	0	0	2
2010 Guangzhou	6	0	0	2	2
2022 Hangzhou	4	0	2	0	2
Total	2	2	2	2	6

=== Cricket ===
Games	Rank	Gold	Silver	Bronze	Total
2022 Hangzhou	1	2	0	0	2
2026 Aichi–Nagoya	1	2	0	0	2
Total	1	4	0	0	4

=== Cue sports ===
Games	Rank	Gold	Silver	Bronze	Total
1998 Bangkok	2	2	1	1	4
2002 Busan	4	1	1	1	3
2006 Doha	5	1	1	2	4
2010 Guangzhou	4	1	1	2	4
Total	3	5	4	6	15

=== Cycling ===
Games	Rank	Gold	Silver	Bronze	Total
1951 New Delhi	2	0	1	2	3
Total	17	0	1	2	3

=== Diving ===
Games	Rank	Gold	Silver	Bronze	Total
1951 New Delhi	1	2	1	1	4
1954 Manila	3	0	0	1	1
Total	3	2	1	2	5

=== Equestrian ===
Games	Rank	Gold	Silver	Bronze	Total
1982 New Delhi	1	3	1	1	5
1986 Seoul	4	0	0	2	2
1998 Bangkok	5	0	0	1	1
2002 Busan	5	0	0	1	1
2006 Doha	9	0	0	1	1
2018 Jakarta–Palembang	5	0	2	0	2
2022 Hangzhou	3	1	0	1	2
Total	3	4	3	7	14

=== Field hockey ===
Games	Rank	Gold	Silver	Bronze	Total
1958 Tokyo	2	0	1	0	1
1962 Jakarta	2	0	1	0	1
1966 Bangkok	1	1	0	0	1
1970 Bangkok	2	0	1	0	1
1974 Tehran	2	0	1	0	1
1978 Bangkok	2	0	1	0	1
1982 New Delhi	1	1	1	0	2
1986 Seoul	4	0	0	2	2
1990 Beijing	3	0	1	0	1
1994 Hiroshima	2	0	1	0	1
1998 Bangkok	1	1	1	0	2
2002 Busan	3	0	1	0	1
2006 Doha	4	0	0	1	1
2010 Guangzhou	5	0	0	1	1
2014 Incheon	1	1	0	1	2
2018 Jakarta–Palembang	2	0	1	1	2
2022 Hangzhou	1	1	0	1	2
2026 Aichi–Nagoya	1	2	0	0	2
Total	3	7	11	7	25

=== Football ===
Games	Rank	Gold	Silver	Bronze	Total
1951 New Delhi	1	1	0	0	1
1962 Jakarta	1	1	0	0	1
1970 Bangkok	3	0	0	1	1
Total	6	2	0	1	3

=== Golf ===
Games	Rank	Gold	Silver	Bronze	Total
1982 New Delhi	1	2	1	0	3
2002 Busan	3	1	0	0	1
2006 Doha	4	0	1	0	1
2010 Guangzhou	3	0	1	0	1
2022 Hangzhou	4	0	1	0	1
2026 Aichi–Nagoya	2	1	1	0	2
Total	4	4	5	0	9

=== Gymnastics ===
Games	Rank	Gold	Silver	Bronze	Total
2010 Guangzhou	7	0	0	1	1
Total	13	0	0	1	1

=== Judo ===
Games	Rank	Gold	Silver	Bronze	Total
1986 Seoul	4	0	0	4	4
1994 Hiroshima	9	0	0	1	1
Total	17	0	0	5	5

=== Kabaddi ===
Games	Rank	Gold	Silver	Bronze	Total
1990 Beijing	1	1	0	0	1
1994 Hiroshima	1	1	0	0	1
1998 Bangkok	1	1	0	0	1
2002 Busan	1	1	0	0	1
2006 Doha	1	1	0	0	1
2010 Guangzhou	1	2	0	0	2
2014 Incheon	1	2	0	0	2
2018 Jakarta–Palembang	2	0	1	1	2
2022 Hangzhou	1	2	0	0	2
2026 Aichi–Nagoya	1	2	0	0	2
Total	1	13	1	1	15

=== Kurash ===
Games	Rank	Gold	Silver	Bronze	Total
2018 Jakarta–Palembang	4	0	1	1	2
2026 Aichi–Nagoya	8	0	0	1	1
Total	5	0	1	2	3

=== Mixed Martial Arts ===
Games	Rank	Gold	Silver	Bronze	Total
2026 Aichi–Nagoya	9	0	0	1	1
Total	9	0	0	1	1

=== Roller sports ===
Games	Rank	Gold	Silver	Bronze	Total
2010 Guangzhou	5	0	0	2	2
2022 Hangzhou	7	0	0	2	2
Total	7	0	0	4	4

=== Rowing ===
Games	Rank	Gold	Silver	Bronze	Total
1982 New Delhi	5	0	0	1	1
1990 Beijing	5	0	0	4	4
1994 Hiroshima	6	0	0	1	1
1998 Bangkok	7	0	0	2	2
2002 Busan	9	0	0	1	1
2006 Doha	5	0	2	1	3
2010 Guangzhou	3	1	3	1	5
2014 Incheon	9	0	0	3	3
2018 Jakarta–Palembang	6	1	0	2	3
2022 Hangzhou	5	0	2	3	5
2026 Aichi–Nagoya	9	0	0	1	1
Total	7	2	7	20	29

=== Sailing ===
Games	Rank	Gold	Silver	Bronze	Total
1970 Bangkok	6	0	0	1	1
1978 Bangkok	4	0	1	0	1
1982 New Delhi	3	1	1	1	3
1986 Seoul	6	0	1	0	1
1990 Beijing	7	0	0	2	2
1994 Hiroshima	8	0	0	2	2
2002 Busan	7	0	1	2	3
2006 Doha	8	0	1	1	2
2010 Guangzhou	8	0	1	0	1
2014 Incheon	8	0	0	1	1
2018 Jakarta–Palembang	7	0	1	2	3
2022 Hangzhou	8	0	1	2	3
2026 Aichi–Nagoya	7	0	1	2	3
Total	10	1	9	16	26

=== Sepak takraw ===
Games	Rank	Gold	Silver	Bronze	Total
2018 Jakarta–Palembang	9	0	0	1	1
2022 Hangzhou	9	0	0	1	1
2026 Aichi–Nagoya	8	0	0	1	1
Total	11	0	0	3	3

=== Shooting ===
Games	Rank	Gold	Silver	Bronze	Total
1962 Jakarta	7	0	0	1	1
1974 Tehran	6	0	1	1	2
1978 Bangkok	5	1	0	0	1
1982 New Delhi	6	0	2	1	3
1986 Seoul	5	0	1	2	3
1990 Beijing	6	0	0	1	1
1994 Hiroshima	7	1	0	1	2
1998 Bangkok	9	0	2	1	3
2002 Busan	10	0	2	0	2
2006 Doha	4	3	5	6	14
2010 Guangzhou	5	1	3	4	8
2014 Incheon	8	1	1	7	9
2018 Jakarta–Palembang	3	2	4	3	9
2022 Hangzhou	2	7	9	6	22
2026 Aichi–Nagoya	2	3	8	4	15
Total	6	19	38	38	95

=== Squash ===
Games	Rank	Gold	Silver	Bronze	Total
2006 Doha	3	0	0	1	1
2010 Guangzhou	4	0	0	3	3
2014 Incheon	2	1	2	1	4
2018 Jakarta–Palembang	3	0	1	4	5
2022 Hangzhou	2	2	1	2	5
2026 Aichi–Nagoya	3	0	2	3	5
Total	3	3	6	14	23

=== Soft tennis ===
Games	Rank	Gold	Silver	Bronze	Total
2026 Aichi–Nagoya	5	0	0	1	1
Total	7	0	0	1	1

=== Swimming ===
Games	Rank	Gold	Silver	Bronze	Total
1951 New Delhi	3	1	1	4	6
1986 Seoul	5	0	1	0	1
2010 Guangzhou	7	0	0	1	1
2014 Incheon	8	0	0	1	1
Total	14	1	2	6	9

=== Table tennis ===
Games	Rank	Gold	Silver	Bronze	Total
2018 Jakarta–Palembang	4	0	0	2	2
2022 Hangzhou	7	0	0	1	1
2026 Aichi–Nagoya	5	0	0	1	1
Total	11	0	0	4	4

=== Taekwondo ===
Games	Rank	Gold	Silver	Bronze	Total
2002 Busan	13	0	0	1	1
Total	24	0	0	1	1

=== Tennis ===
Games	Rank	Gold	Silver	Bronze	Total
1966 Bangkok	8	0	0	1	1
1978 Bangkok	7	0	0	1	1
1982 New Delhi	5	0	1	0	1
1990 Beijing	5	0	0	1	1
1994 Hiroshima	3	2	0	1	3
1998 Bangkok	7	0	0	4	4
2002 Busan	3	1	1	2	4
2006 Doha	1	2	2	0	4
2010 Guangzhou	2	2	1	2	5
2014 Incheon	3	1	1	3	5
2018 Jakarta–Palembang	2	1	0	2	3
2022 Hangzhou	3	1	1	0	2
Total	5	10	7	17	34

=== Volleyball ===
Games	Rank	Gold	Silver	Bronze	Total
1958 Tokyo	4	0	0	1	1
1962 Jakarta	3	0	1	0	1
1986 Seoul	4	0	0	1	1
Total	5	0	1	2	3

=== Water polo ===
Games	Rank	Gold	Silver	Bronze	Total
1951 New Delhi	1	1	0	0	1
1970 Bangkok	2	0	1	0	1
1982 New Delhi	3	0	0	1	1
Total	5	1	1	1	3

=== Weightlifting ===
Games	Rank	Gold	Silver	Bronze	Total
1951 New Delhi	3	0	1	1	2
1982 New Delhi	8	0	0	2	2
1986 Seoul	7	0	0	1	1
1990 Beijing	5	0	2	2	4
1994 Hiroshima	8	0	1	3	4
1998 Bangkok	9	0	1	0	1
2026 Aichi–Nagoya	10	0	1	0	1
Total	20	0	6	9	15

=== Wrestling ===
Games	Rank	Gold	Silver	Bronze	Total
1954 Manila	5	0	1	1	2
1962 Jakarta	3	3	6	3	12
1966 Bangkok	4	0	1	5	6
1970 Bangkok	3	1	1	3	5
1974 Tehran	5	0	0	4	4
1978 Bangkok	2	2	1	0	3
1982 New Delhi	4	1	1	2	4
1986 Seoul	5	1	0	2	3
1990 Beijing	7	0	1	1	2
2002 Busan	11	0	0	1	1
2006 Doha	7	0	1	5	6
2010 Guangzhou	11	0	0	3	3
2014 Incheon	7	1	1	3	5
2018 Jakarta–Palembang	6	2	0	1	3
2022 Hangzhou	10	0	1	5	6
2026 Aichi–Nagoya	3	2	2	2	6
Total	5	13	17	41	71

=== Wushu ===
Games	Rank	Gold	Silver	Bronze	Total
2006 Doha	12	0	0	1	1
2010 Guangzhou	9	0	1	1	2
2014 Incheon	11	0	0	2	2
2018 Jakarta–Palembang	10	0	0	4	4
2022 Hangzhou	9	0	1	0	1
2026 Aichi–Nagoya	11	0	1	0	1
Total	14	0	3	8	11

== Most successful athletes ==
Most successful athletes
Athlete	Sport	Years	Gender	Gold	Silver	Bronze	Total
Leander Paes	Tennis	1990–2006	M	5	0	3	8
P. T. Usha	Athletics	1982–1994	F	4	7	0	11
Jaspal Rana	Shooting	1994–2006	M	4	2	2	8
Jyothi Surekha	Archery	2014–2026	F	4	1	1	6
M. R. Poovamma	Athletics	2014–2026	F	4	1	1	6
Milkha Singh	Athletics	1958–1962	M	4	0	0	4
Parduman Singh Brar	Athletics	1954–1962	M	3	1	1	5
Manjeet Kaur	Athletics	2002–2010	F	3	1	0	4
Harinder Pal Sandhu	Squash	2010–2022	M	3	0	2	5
Manpreet Singh	Field hockey	2014–2026	M	3	0	1	4
Navneet Gautam	Kabaddi	2006–2014	M	3	0	0	3
Rakesh Kumar	Kabaddi	2006–2014	M	3	0	0	3
Ojas Deotale	Archery	2022	M	3	0	0	3

== Other multi-sport events ==
=== Asian Winter Games ===
India has sent athletes to every Asian Winter Games since its inception in 1986. However, India has never won a medal in the Winter Games.

=== Asian Indoor and Martial Arts Games ===
Games	Host nation	Rank	Gold	Silver	Bronze	Total
Asian Indoor Games
2005 Bangkok	Thailand	5	7	3	8	18
2007 Macau	China	6	9	9	10	28
2009 Hanoi	Vietnam	7	6	9	25	40
Asian Martial Arts Games
2009 Bangkok	Thailand	10	3	7	23	33
Asian Indoor and Martial Arts Games
2013 Incheon	South Korea	12	2	3	5	10
2017 Ashgabat	Turkmenistan	11	9	12	19	40
2021 Bangkok–Chonburi	Thailand	Cancelled				
2026 Riyadh	Saudi Arabia	Future event				
Total		9	36	43	90	169

=== Asian Beach Games ===
India has participated in both the editions of the Asian Beach Games. In the 2008 Games, India won a total of five medals, including three gold, and ranked seventh in the final medal table. Three gold medals were won by India in the 2010 Asian Beach Games in Muscat, Oman, earning the country sixth place in the medal table.

Games	Host nations	Rank	Gold	Silver	Bronze	Total
2008 Bali	Indonesia	7	3	0	2	5
2010 Muscat	Oman	6	3	0	1	4
2012 Haiyang	China	6	2	0	1	3
2014 Phuket	Philippines	20	2	1	7	10
2016 Da Nang	Vietnam	16	2	4	18	24
2026 Sanya	China	6	3	2	0	5
Total		11	15	7	29	51

== See also ==
- India at the Olympics
- India at the Deaflympics
- India at the Youth Olympics
- India at the Paralympics
- India at the World Games
- India at the Commonwealth Games
- India at the Asian Para Games
- India at the Asian Youth Games
- India at the Lusofonia Games
- India at the South Asian Games

== Notes ==
- ^{a} The National Olympic Committees are all members of the Association of National Olympic Committees (ANOC), which is also split among five continental associations: Association of National Olympic Committees of Africa, Pan American Sports Organization, Olympic Council of Asia, European Olympic Committees, and Oceania National Olympic Committees.
