= Wrestling at the 1962 Asian Games – Men's Greco-Roman 52 kg =

Men's Greco-Roman 52 kg at the 1962 Asian Games
- Venue: Ikada Sports Hall
- Dates: 25–27 August 1962
- Competitors: 4 from 4 nations

Medalists
gold medal	Malwa Singh	India
silver medal	Tsutomu Hanahara	Japan
bronze medal	Mujari	Indonesia

The men's Greco-Roman 52 kilograms (flyweight) Greco-Roman wrestling competition at the 1962 Asian Games in Jakarta was held from 25 to 27 August 1962.

The competition used a form of negative points tournament, with negative points given for any result short of a fall. Accumulation of 6 negative points eliminated the wrestler. When three or fewer wrestlers remained, they advanced to a final round, with only preliminary results amongst them carried forward.

== Schedule ==
All times are Western Indonesian Time (UTC+07:30)

Date	Time	Event
Saturday, 25 August 1962	08:00	1st round
Sunday, 26 August 1962	08:00	2nd round
Monday, 27 August 1962	08:00	3rd round

== Results ==
=== 1st round ===
TBM		BM		BM		TBM
0	Tsutomu Hanahara (JPN)	0	Fall 2:10	4	Hassan Muhammad (PAK)	4
1	Malwa Singh (IND)	1	Decision	3	Mujari (INA)	3

=== 2nd round ===
TBM		BM		BM		TBM
3	Tsutomu Hanahara (JPN)	3	Decision	1	Malwa Singh (IND)	2
6	Hassan Muhammad (PAK)	2	Draw	2	Mujari (INA)	5

=== 3rd round ===
TBM		BM		BM		TBM
3	Tsutomu Hanahara (JPN)	0	Fall 2:01	4	Mujari (INA)	9
2	Malwa Singh (IND)				Bye	

== Final standing ==
Rank	Athlete	Round			TBM	FBM
Rank	Athlete	1	2	3	TBM	FBM
1st place, gold medalist(s)	Malwa Singh (IND)	1	1	Bye	2	2
2nd place, silver medalist(s)	Tsutomu Hanahara (JPN)	0	3	0	3	3
3rd place, bronze medalist(s)	Mujari (INA)	3	2	4	9	7
4	Hassan Muhammad (PAK)	4	2		6	
