= Wrestling at the 1962 Asian Games – Men's Greco-Roman 70 kg =

Men's Greco-Roman 70 kg at the 1962 Asian Games
- Venue: Ikada Sports Hall
- Dates: 25–27 August 1962
- Competitors: 5 from 5 nations

Medalists
gold medal	Yoichi Sasaki	Japan
silver medal	Udey Chand	India
bronze medal	Ghulam Rasool	Pakistan

The men's Greco-Roman 70 kilograms (lightweight) Greco-Roman wrestling competition at the 1962 Asian Games in Jakarta was held from 25 to 27 August 1962.

The competition used a form of negative points tournament, with negative points given for any result short of a fall. Accumulation of 6 negative points eliminated the wrestler. When three or fewer wrestlers remained, they advanced to a final round, with only preliminary results amongst them carried forward.

== Schedule ==
All times are Western Indonesian Time (UTC+07:30)

Date	Time	Event
Saturday, 25 August 1962	08:00	1st round
Sunday, 26 August 1962	08:00	2nd round
Monday, 27 August 1962	08:00	3rd round
Monday, 27 August 1962	14:30	4th round

== Results ==
=== 1st round ===
TBM		BM		BM		TBM
2	Ghulam Rasool (PAK)	2	Draw	2	Joseph Taliwongso (INA)	2
0	Yoichi Sasaki (JPN)	0	Fall 1:45	4	Henry Victor Perera (CEY)	4
0	Udey Chand (IND)				Bye	

=== 2nd round ===
TBM		BM		BM		TBM
1	Udey Chand (IND)	1	Decision	3	Ghulam Rasool (PAK)	5
6	Joseph Taliwongso (INA)	4	Fall 3:42	0	Yoichi Sasaki (JPN)	0

- Henry Victor Perera (CEY) withdrew.

=== 3rd round ===
TBM		BM		BM		TBM
4	Udey Chand (IND)	3	Decision	1	Yoichi Sasaki (JPN)	1
5	Ghulam Rasool (PAK)				Bye	

=== 4th round ===
TBM		BM		BM		TBM
8	Ghulam Rasool (PAK)	3	Decision	1	Yoichi Sasaki (JPN)	2
4	Udey Chand (IND)				Bye	

== Final standing ==
Rank	Athlete	Round				TBM	FBM
Rank	Athlete	1	2	3	4	TBM	FBM
1st place, gold medalist(s)	Yoichi Sasaki (JPN)	0	0	1	1	2	2
2nd place, silver medalist(s)	Udey Chand (IND)	0	1	3	Bye	4	4
3rd place, bronze medalist(s)	Ghulam Rasool (PAK)	2	3	Bye	3	8	6
4	Joseph Taliwongso (INA)	2	4			6	
5	Henry Victor Perera (CEY)	4				4	
