= Boxing at the 1962 Asian Games – Men's 75 kg =

Boxing competitions

Men's 75 kg at the 1962 Asian Games
- Venue: Senayan Tennis Stadium
- Date: 26–31 August 1962
- Competitors: 4 from 4 nations

Medalists
gold medal	Kim Duk-pal	South Korea
silver medal	Gul Muhammad	Pakistan
bronze medal	Alex Abast	Indonesia
bronze medal	Surendra Sarkar	India

The men's middleweight (75 kilograms) event at the 1962 Asian Games took place from 26 to 31 August 1962 at Senayan Tennis Stadium, Jakarta, Indonesia.

== Schedule ==
All times are Western Indonesian Time (UTC+07:30)

Date	Time	Event
Sunday, 26 August 1962	20:00	Semifinals
Friday, 31 August 1962	20:00	Final

== Results ==
Legend

- PTS — Won by points

Semifinals		Final
Gul Muhammad (PAK)	PTS
Alex Abast (INA)		Gul Muhammad (PAK)
Kim Duk-pal (KOR)	PTS	Kim Duk-pal (KOR)	PTS
Surendra Sarkar (IND)
