= Wrestling at the 1962 Asian Games – Men's Greco-Roman 57 kg =

Men's Greco-Roman 57 kg at the 1962 Asian Games
- Venue: Ikada Sports Hall
- Dates: 25–27 August 1962
- Competitors: 4 from 4 nations

Medalists
gold medal	Masamitsu Ichiguchi	Japan
silver medal	Siraj Din	Pakistan
bronze medal	Narin Ghume	India

The men's Greco-Roman 57 kilograms (bantamweight) Greco-Roman wrestling competition at the 1962 Asian Games in Jakarta was held from 25 to 27 August 1962.

The competition used a form of negative points tournament, with negative points given for any result short of a fall. Accumulation of 6 negative points eliminated the wrestler. When three or fewer wrestlers remained, they advanced to a final round, with only preliminary results amongst them carried forward.

== Schedule ==
All times are Western Indonesian Time (UTC+07:30)

Date	Time	Event
Saturday, 25 August 1962	08:00	1st round
Sunday, 26 August 1962	08:00	2nd round
Monday, 27 August 1962	08:00	3rd round

== Results ==
=== 1st round ===
TBM		BM		BM		TBM
4	Narin Ghume (IND)	4	Fall 2:00	0	Masamitsu Ichiguchi (JPN)	0
1	Siraj Din (PAK)	1	Decision	3	Wachmana (INA)	3

=== 2nd round ===
TBM		BM		BM		TBM
7	Narin Ghume (IND)	3	Decision	1	Siraj Din (PAK)	2
0	Masamitsu Ichiguchi (JPN)	0	Fall 1:34	4	Wachmana (INA)	7

=== 3rd round ===
TBM		BM		BM		TBM
0	Masamitsu Ichiguchi (JPN)	0	Fall 9:44	4	Siraj Din (PAK)	6

== Final standing ==
Rank	Athlete	Round			TBM	FBM
Rank	Athlete	1	2	3	TBM	FBM
1st place, gold medalist(s)	Masamitsu Ichiguchi (JPN)	0	0	0	0	0
2nd place, silver medalist(s)	Siraj Din (PAK)	1	1	4	6	4
3rd place, bronze medalist(s)	Narin Ghume (IND)	4	3		7	
4	Wachmana (INA)	3	4		7	
