= Malaya at the 1962 Asian Games =

- IOC code: MAS
- NOC: Olympic Council of Malaysia
- Website: www.olympic.org.my (in English)

in Jakarta
- Competitors: 121 in 11 sports
- Medals Ranked 8th: Gold 2 Silver 4 Bronze 9 Total 15

Asian Games appearances (overview)
- 1954; 1958; 1962; 1966; 1970; 1974; 1978; 1982; 1986; 1990; 1994; 1998; 2002; 2006; 2010; 2014; 2018; 2022; 2026

Other related appearances
- North Borneo (1954, 1958, 1962); Sarawak (1962)

The Federation of Malaya competed in the 1962 Asian Games held in Jakarta, Indonesia from 24 August 1962 to 4 September 1962. It ranked eighth in the overall medal table with two gold medals, four silver medals and nine bronze medals.

== Medal summary ==
=== Medals by sport ===
Sport	Gold	Silver	Bronze	Total	Rank
Athletics	1	2	4	7	6
Badminton	1	2	2	5	2
Cycling	0	0	1	1	5
Field hockey	0	0	1	1	3
Football	0	0	1	1	3
Total	2	4	9	15	8

=== Medallists ===
Medal	Name	Sport	Event
Gold	Mani Jegathesan	Athletics	Men's 200 metres
Gold	Ng Boon Bee; Tan Yee Khan	Badminton	Men's doubles
Silver	Mani Jegathesan	Athletics	Men's 100 metres
Silver	Abdul Rahim Ahmed; Karu Selvaratnam; Mani Jegathesan; Victor Asirvatham	Athletics	Men's 4 × 400 metres relay
Silver	Teh Kew San	Badminton	Men's singles
Silver	Annie Keong; Jean Moey; Kok Lee Ying; Ng Mei Ling; Tan Gaik Bee	Badminton	Women's team
Bronze	Karu Selvaratnam	Athletics	Men's 400 metres hurdles
Bronze	Mani Jegathesan; Thor Gim Soon; V. Vijiaratnam; Shahrudin Mohamed Ali	Athletics	Men's 4 × 100 metres relay
Bronze	Cyril Perera	Athletics	Men's decathlon
Bronze	Maureen Ann Lee	Athletics	Women's long jump
Bronze	Billy Ng; Ng Boon Bee; Tan Yee Khan; Teh Kew San; Yew Cheng Hoe	Badminton	Men's team
Bronze	Ng Mei Ling; Tan Gaik Bee	Badminton	Women's doubles
Bronze	Jaafar Bibon; Mohamad Jaafar; Rosli Abdul Kadir	Cycling	Men's team road race
Bronze	Malaysia national field hockey team: Mike Shepherdson; Kandiah Anandarajah; Ho Koh Chye; Manikam Shanmuganathan; Michael Arulraj; Thuraisingam Sinnadurai; Lawrence van Huizen; Chua Eng Wah; Chelliah Paramalingam; Mani Sockalingam; Rajaratnam Yogeswaran; Arumugam Sabapathy; Aboo Samah; Mohd Hariff Taib; Ismail Ali; Robin Jayesuria	Field hockey	Men's tournament
Bronze	Malaysia national football team: Sexton Lourdes; Tunku Ismail; Yee Seng Choy; Ahmad Nazari; Foo Fook Choon; Abdullah Nordin; Kamaruddin Ahmad; Edwin Dutton; Boey Chong Liam; Roslan Buang; I. J. Singh; Stanley Gabrielle; Abdul Ghani Minhat; Robert Choe; Mahat Ambu; Arthur Koh; M. Govindarajoo; Richard Choe; Ibrahim Mydin	Football	Men's tournament

== Athletics ==
Key

- Note– Ranks given for track events are within the athlete's heat only
- Q = Qualified for the next round
- q = Qualified for the next round as a fastest loser or, in field events, by position without achieving the qualifying target
- NR = National record
- N/A = Round not applicable for the event
- Bye = Athlete not required to compete in round

Men
Track events

Athlete	Event	Final	
Athlete	Event	Time	Rank
Mani Jegathesan	100 m	10.6	2nd place, silver medalist(s)
Mani Jegathesan	200 m	21.3 GR	1st place, gold medalist(s)
Karu Selvaratnam	400 m hurdles	53.4	3rd place, bronze medalist(s)
Mani Jegathesan; Thor Gim Soon; V. Vijiaratnam; Shahrudin Mohamed Ali	4 × 100 m relay	41.5	3rd place, bronze medalist(s)
Abdul Rahim Ahmed; Karu Selvaratnam; Mani Jegathesan; Victor Asirvatham	4 × 400 m relay	41.5	2nd place, silver medalist(s)

Combined events – Decathlon

Athlete	Event	100 m	LJ	SP	HJ	400 m	110H	DT	PV	JT	1500 m	Final	Rank
Cyril Perera	Result											5575	3rd place, bronze medalist(s)
Cyril Perera	Points											5575	3rd place, bronze medalist(s)

Women
Field event

Athlete	Event	Final	
Athlete	Event	Distance	Rank
Maureen Ann Lee	Long jump	5.31	3rd place, bronze medalist(s)

== Badminton ==
Athlete	Event	Quarterfinal	Semifinal	Final	Rank
Athlete	Event	Opposition Score	Opposition Score	Opposition Score	Rank
Teh Kew San	Men's singles			Gold medal match Tan Joe Hok; Indonesia; L	2nd place, silver medalist(s)
Ng Boon Bee; Tan Yee Khan	Men's doubles			Gold medal match Indonesia (INA); Tan Joe Hok; Liem Tjeng Kiang; W	1st place, gold medalist(s)
Billy Ng; Ng Boon Bee; Tan Yee Khan; Teh Kew San; Yew Cheng Hoe	Men's team	Cambodia (CAM); W 5–0	Thailand (THA); L 2–3	Bronze medal match Singapore (SIN); W 3–2	3rd place, bronze medalist(s)
Ng Mei Ling; Tan Gaik Bee	Women's doubles				3rd place, bronze medalist(s)
Annie Keong; Jean Moey; Kok Lee Ying; Ng Mei Ling; Tan Gaik Bee	Women's team	—N/a	Japan (JPN); W 3–2	Gold medal match Indonesia (INA); L 2–3	2nd place, silver medalist(s)

== Basketball ==
=== Men's tournament ===
Group C

Team	Pld	W	L	PF	PA	PD	Pts
Japan	3	3	0	236	171	+65	6
South Korea	3	2	1	236	203	+24	5
Singapore	3	1	2	216	247	−29	4
Malaya	3	0	3	184	244	−60	3

Qualified for the finals

25 August

South Korea	84–65	Malaya

Senayan Basketball Hall, Jakarta

26 August

Japan	65–58	Malaya

Senayan Basketball Hall, Jakarta

27 August

Singapore	95–61	Malaya

Senayan Basketball Hall, Jakarta

Seventh to ninth place classification

Team	Pld	W	L	PF	PA	PD	Pts	Rank
Cambodia	2	2	0	149	131	+18	4	7
Singapore	2	1	1	156	142	+14	3	8
Malaya	2	0	2	126	158	−32	2	9

30 August

Cambodia	73–60	Malaya

Senayan Basketball Hall, Jakarta

31 August

Singapore	85–66	Malaya

Senayan Basketball Hall, Jakarta

Ranked 9th in final standings

== Cycling ==
=== Road ===
Athlete	Event	Time	Rank
Jaafar Bibon; Mohamad Jaafar; Rosli Abdul Kadir	Men's individual road race		3rd place, bronze medalist(s)

== Field hockey ==
=== Men's tournament ===
Team roster

- Mike Shepherdson
- Kandiah Anandarajah
- Ho Koh Chye
- Manikam Shanmuganathan
- Michael Arulraj
- Doraisamy Munusamy
- Lawrence van Huizen
- Chua Eng Wah
- Chelliah Paramalingam
- Mani Sockalingam
- Rajaratnam Yogeswaran
- Arumugam Sabapathy
- Aboo Samah
- Mohd Hariff Taib
- Ismail Ali
- Robin Jayesuria

Group A

Pos	Team	Pld	W	D	L	GF	GA	GD	Pts	Qualification
1	India	3	3	0	0	12	0	+12	6	Semi-finals
2	Malaya	3	2	0	1	9	4	+5	4	Semi-finals
3	Hong Kong	3	1	0	2	2	8	−6	2	
4	South Korea	3	0	0	3	1	12	−11	0	

26 August

India	3–0	Malaya

Senayan Stadium, Jakarta

28 August

Malaya	5–1	South Korea

Senayan Stadium, Jakarta

30 August

Malaya	4–0	Hong Kong

Senayan Stadium, Jakarta

Semifinal

2 September

Pakistan	5–0	Malaya

Senayan Stadium, Jakarta

Bronze medal match

3 September

Japan	0–2	Malaya

Senayan Stadium, Jakarta

Ranked 3rd in final standings

== Football ==
=== Men's tournament ===
Squad

- Sexton Lourdes
- Tunku Ismail
- Yee Seng Choy
- Ahmad Nazari
- Foo Fook Choon
- Abdullah Nordin
- Kamaruddin Ahmad
- Edwin Dutton
- Boey Chong Liam
- Roslan Buang
- I. J. Singh
- Stanley Gabrielle
- Abdul Ghani Minhat
- Robert Choe
- Mahat Ambu
- Arthur Koh
- M. Govindarajoo
- Richard Choe
- Ibrahim Mydin

Group A

Team	Pld	W	D	L	GF	GA	GR	Pts	Qualification
South Vietnam	3	2	0	1	9	1	9.000	4	Qualified for the semifinals
Malaya	3	2	0	1	18	6	3.000	4	Qualified for the semifinals
Indonesia	3	2	0	1	9	3	3.000	4	
Philippines	3	0	0	3	1	27	0.037	0	

Source: RSSSF
26 August

Malaya	15–1	Philippines

Senayan Stadium, Jakarta

28 August

Indonesia	2–3	Malaya

Senayan Stadium, Jakarta

29 August

South Vietnam	3–0	Malaya

Senayan Stadium, Jakarta
- Malaya won a draw for second place against Indonesia on 30 August, necessary as they were both equal on points and goal average.

Semifinal

1 September

South Korea	2–1 (a.e.t.)	Malaya

Senayan Stadium, Jakarta

Bronze medal match

3 September

South Vietnam	1–4	Malaya

Senayan Stadium, Jakarta

Ranked 3rd in final standings

== Volleyball ==
=== Men's tournament (nine-a-side) ===
Final round

Pos	Team	Pld	W	L	Pts	SW	SL	SR	SPW	SPL	SPR
1st place, gold medalist(s)	Japan	5	5	0	10	15	1	15.000	0	0	—
2nd place, silver medalist(s)	South Korea	5	4	1	9	13	4	3.250	0	0	—
3rd place, bronze medalist(s)	Philippines	5	3	2	8	11	6	1.833	328	325	1.009
4	Indonesia	5	2	3	7	8	9	0.889	307	301	1.020
5	Singapore	5	1	4	6	3	12	0.250	180	295	0.610
6	Malaya	5	0	5	5	0	15	0.000	163	315	0.517

Date		Score		Set 1	Set 2	Set 3	Set 4	Set 5	Total
25 Aug	South Korea	3–0	Malaya	21–4	21–12	21–8			63–24
27 Aug	Malaya	0–3	Philippines	18–21	10–21	10–21			38–63
28 Aug	Japan	3–0	Malaya	21–6	21–10	21–5			63–21
29 Aug	Indonesia	3–0	Malaya	21–11	21–11	21–15			63–37
1 Sep	Malaya	0–3	Singapore	16–21	9–21	18–21			43–63

Ranked 6th in final standings
