= Boxing at the 1962 Asian Games – Men's 81 kg =

Boxing competitions

Men's 81 kg at the 1962 Asian Games
- Venue: Senayan Tennis Stadium
- Date: 26–31 August 1962
- Competitors: 3 from 3 nations

Medalists
gold medal	Muhammad Safdar	Pakistan
silver medal	Paruhum Siregar	Indonesia
bronze medal	Tetsuya Arita	Japan

The men's light heavyweight (81 kilograms) event at the 1962 Asian Games took place from 26 to 31 August 1962 at Senayan Tennis Stadium, Jakarta, Indonesia.

== Schedule ==
All times are Western Indonesian Time (UTC+07:30)

Date	Time	Event
Sunday, 26 August 1962	20:00	Semifinals
Friday, 31 August 1962	20:00	Final

== Results ==
Legend

- PTS — Won by points

Semifinals		Final
		Muhammad Safdar (PAK)	PTS
Paruhum Siregar (INA)	PTS	Paruhum Siregar (INA)
Tetsuya Arita (JPN)
