= Diving at the 1962 Asian Games =

Diving at the 1962 Asian Games in Indonesia

- Venue: Senayan Swimming Stadium
- Dates: 29 August – 1 September 1962

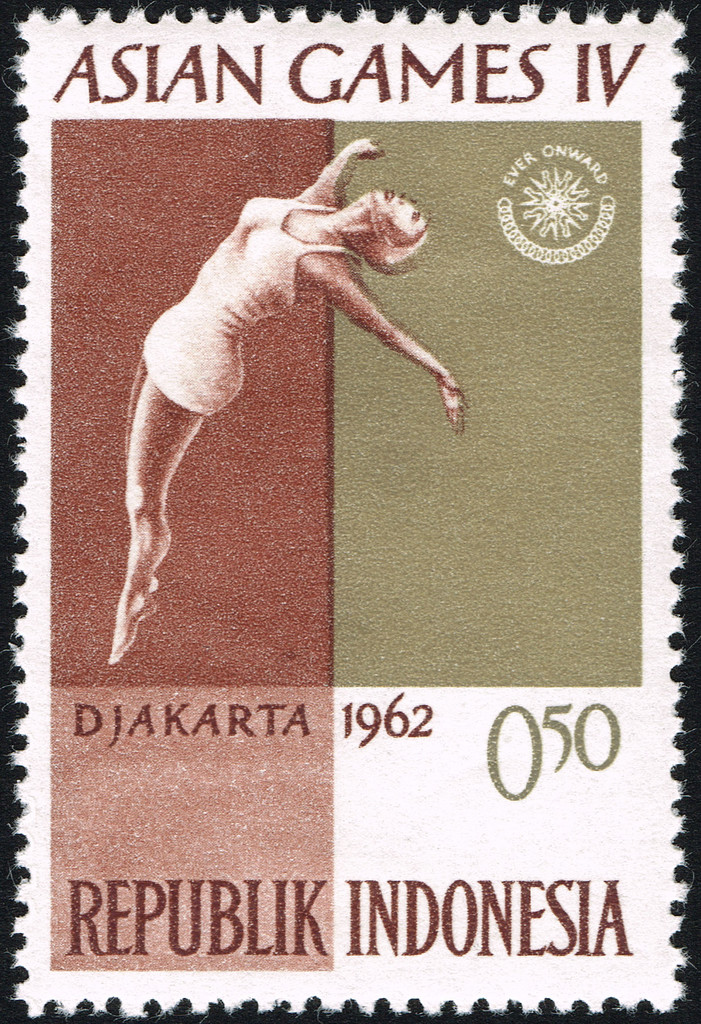
Diving at the 1962 Asian Games on a stamp of Indonesia

Diving was contested at the 1962 Asian Games in Senayan Swimming Stadium, Jakarta, Indonesia from 29 August to 1 September 1962.

== Medalists ==
=== Men ===
Event	Gold	Silver	Bronze
3 m springboard	Ryohei Okada; Japan	Kazuo Tahara; Japan	Billy Gumulya; Indonesia
10 m platform	Ryohei Okada; Japan	Hiroshi Taniguchi; Japan	Cho Chang-jae; South Korea

=== Women ===
Event	Gold	Silver	Bronze
3 m springboard	Lanny Gumulya; Indonesia	Sakuko Kadokura; Japan	Kayoko Tomoe; Japan
10 m platform	Kayoko Tomoe; Japan	Sakuko Kadokura; Japan	Lanny Gumulya; Indonesia

== Medal table ==
Rank	Nation	Gold	Silver	Bronze	Total
1	Japan (JPN)	3	4	1	8
2	Indonesia (INA)	1	0	2	3
3	South Korea (KOR)	0	0	1	1
Totals (3 entries)		4	4	4	12
