= Cycling at the 1962 Asian Games =

- Dates: 25 August – 2 September 1962

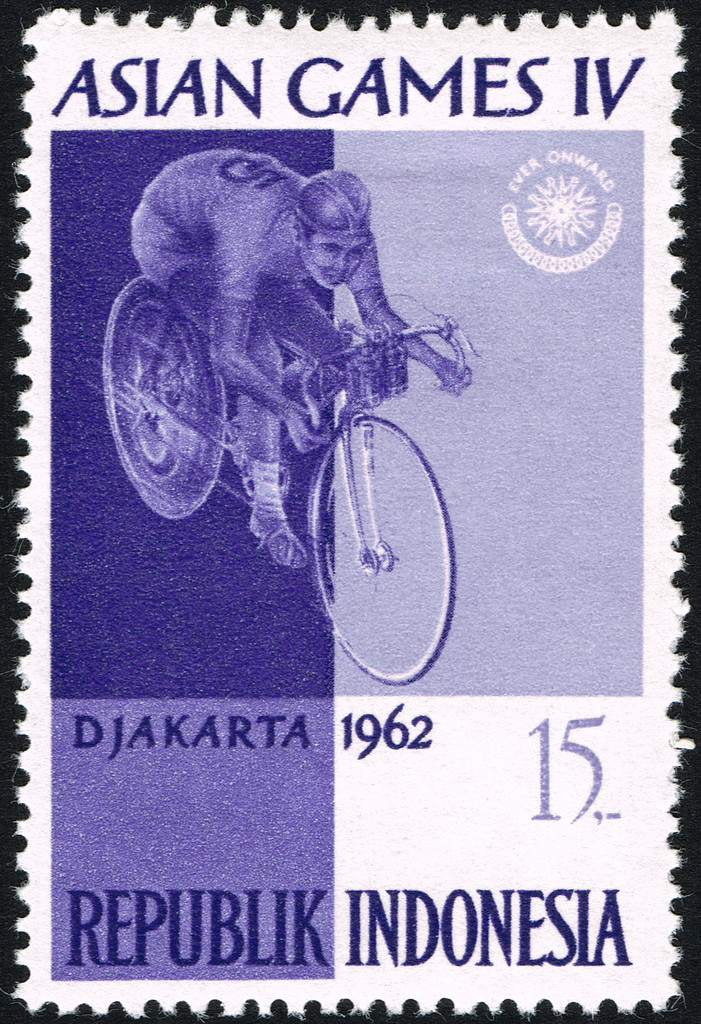
Cycling at the 1962 Asian Games on a stamp of Indonesia

Cycling at the 1962 Asian Games was held in Jakarta, Indonesia between 25 August and 2 September 1962. Two races were held in this competition, the first race was 159 kilometres and the second race (as open road race) was 180 kilometres. The second race results also counted for team road race competition.

== Medalists ==
Event	Gold	Silver	Bronze
Road race	Taworn Jirapan; Thailand	Masashi Omiya; Japan	Won Chung-ho; South Korea
Open road race	Hendrik Brocks; Indonesia	Wanchai Wilasineekul; Thailand	Aming Priatna; Indonesia
Team road race	Indonesia; Hendrik Brocks; Aming Priatna; Wahju Wahdini	Thailand; Taworn Jirapan; Pitaya Kirdtubtin; Wanchai Wilasineekul	Malaya; Rosli Abdul Kadir; Jaafar Bibon; Mohamad Jaafar
Team time trial	Indonesia; Hendrik Brocks; Wahju Wahdini; Hasjim Roesli; Aming Priatna	South Korea; Shin Ki-chul; Ahn Byung-hoon; Song Ung-il; Won Chung-ho	Thailand; Wanchai Wilasineekul; Preeda Chullamondhol; Smaisuk Krisansuwan; Pitaya Kirdtubtin

== Medal table ==
Rank	Nation	Gold	Silver	Bronze	Total
1	Indonesia (INA)	3	0	1	4
2	Thailand (THA)	1	2	1	4
3	South Korea (KOR)	0	1	1	2
4	Japan (JPN)	0	1	0	1
5	Malaya (MAL)	0	0	1	1
Totals (5 entries)		4	4	4	12
