= Boxing at the 1961 SEAP Games =

Boxing at the 1961 Southeast Asian Peninsular Games
- Venue: Aung San National Indoor Stadium
- Date: 12–16 December
- Competitors: 25 from 5 nations

Boxing is one of the 12 sports featured in the 1961 Southeast Asian Peninsular Games. The tournament was held from 12 to 16 December 1961 at the Aung San National Indoor Stadium in Rangoon, Burma.

The competition states that participation for 9 (later down to 7) categories will be limited to one representative per country. Five nations participated in the tournament, including the hosts.

== Participating countries ==
- Burma (Host)
- Cambodia
- Malaya
- Singapore
- Thailand

== Medal table ==
* Host nation (Burma)

Rank	Nation	Gold	Silver	Bronze	Total
1	Burma (BIR)*	6	0	1	7
2	Cambodia (CAM)	1	2	1	4
3	Thailand (THA)	0	4	2	6
4	Singapore (SIN)	0	1	3	4
5	Malaya (MAS)	0	0	1	1
Totals (5 entries)		7	7	8	22

== Medalists ==
Event	Gold	Silver	Bronze
Light flyweight (48 kg)	Hla Shwe; Burma	Nguon Luon; Cambodia	UNKNOWN; Thailand
Flyweight (51 kg)	Hla Nyunt; Burma	Suratin Meepraseart; Thailand	UNKNOWN; Singapore
Bantamweight (54 kg)	Yai Thint; Burma	San Sarak; Cambodia	Somchai Boonjong; Thailand
Bantamweight (54 kg)	Yai Thint; Burma	San Sarak; Cambodia	V. Kesavan; Singapore
Featherweight (57 kg)	You Chin Hong; Cambodia	Samphan Payonrathana; Thailand	UNKNOWN; Singapore
Featherweight (57 kg)	You Chin Hong; Cambodia	Samphan Payonrathana; Thailand	Kyee Maung; Burma
Lightweight (60 kg)	Maung Nyunt; Burma	Sukda Songsang; Thailand	Sok Theil; Cambodia
Lightweight (60 kg)	Maung Nyunt; Burma	Sukda Songsang; Thailand	Ariffin Ali; Malaya
Light welterweight (63.5 kg)	Tin Maung; Burma	Gopalan Ramakrishnan; Singapore	—N/a
Welterweight (67 kg)	Kumar Rai; Burma	Sutep Suttiwudi; Thailand	—N/a

== Results ==
=== Light flyweight (48 kg) ===
Final
Hla Shwe (BIR)	W
Nguon Luon (CAM)

=== Flyweight (51 kg) ===
Final
Hla Nyunt (BIR)	W
Suratin Meepraseart (THA)

=== Bantamweight (54 kg) ===
Semifinals
Yai Thint (BIR)	PTS
Somchai Boonjong (THA)
San Sarak (CAM)	PTS
V. Kesavan (SIN)

Final
Yai Thint (BIR)	W
San Sarak (CAM)

=== Featherweight (57 kg) ===
Quarterfinals
Kyee Maung (BIR)	PTS
Andrew Anthony (MAS)

Semifinals
You Chin Hong (CAM)	W
UNKNOWN (SIN)
Samphan Payonrathana (THA)	W
Kyee Maung (BIR)

Final
You Chin Hong (CAM)	W
Samphan Payonrathana (THA)

=== Lightweight (60 kg) ===
Semifinals
Sukda Songsang (THA)	KO R1
Ariffin Ali (MAS)
Maung Nyunt (BIR)	PTS
Sok Theil (CAM)

Final
Sukda Songsang (THA)
Maung Nyunt (BIR)	W

=== Light welterweight (63.5 kg) ===
Final
Tin Maung (BIR)	W
Gopalan Ramakrishnan (SIN)

=== Welterweight (67 kg) ===
Final
Kumar Rai (BIR)	W
Sutep Suttiwudi (THA)
