= Shooting at the 1962 Asian Games =

- Venue: Cibubur Shooting Range
- Dates: 27–31 August 1962

Shooting sports at the 1962 Asian Games was held in Tjibubur (EYD: Cibubur) Shooting Range in Jakarta, Indonesia, between 27 and 31 August 1962. Shooting comprised 5 events, all opened to both men and women.

Japan dominated the competition after winning three out of five possible gold medals, South Korea and Singapore won the remaining gold medals.

== Medalists ==
Event	Gold	Silver	Bronze
25 m rapid fire pistol	Fumio Ryosenan; Japan	Prateep Polphantin; Thailand	John Posuma; Indonesia
50 m pistol	Yoshihisa Yoshikawa; Japan	Lely Sampurno; Indonesia	Suh Kang-wook; South Korea
50 m rifle prone	Fred de Souza; Singapore	Zenichi Akagawa; Japan	Henry Shaw; India
50 m rifle 3 positions	Takao Ishii; Japan	Adolfo Feliciano; Philippines	Bae Byung-ki; South Korea
300 m rifle 3 positions	Nam Sang-wan; South Korea	Elias Joseph Lessy; Indonesia	Saroch Silpikul; Thailand

== Medal table ==
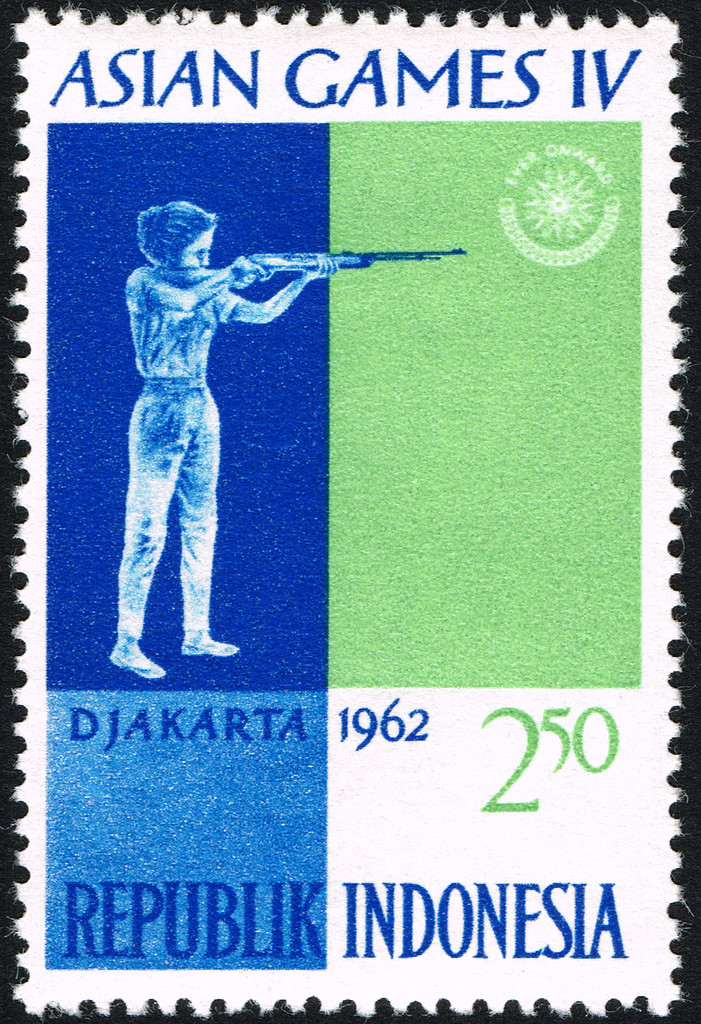
Shooting at the 1962 Asian Games on a stamp of Indonesia

Rank	Nation	Gold	Silver	Bronze	Total
1	Japan (JPN)	3	1	0	4
2	South Korea (KOR)	1	0	2	3
3	Singapore (SIN)	1	0	0	1
4	Indonesia (INA)	0	2	1	3
5	Thailand (THA)	0	1	1	2
6	Philippines (PHI)	0	1	0	1
7	India (IND)	0	0	1	1
Totals (7 entries)		5	5	5	15
