= 1962 Asian Games medal table =

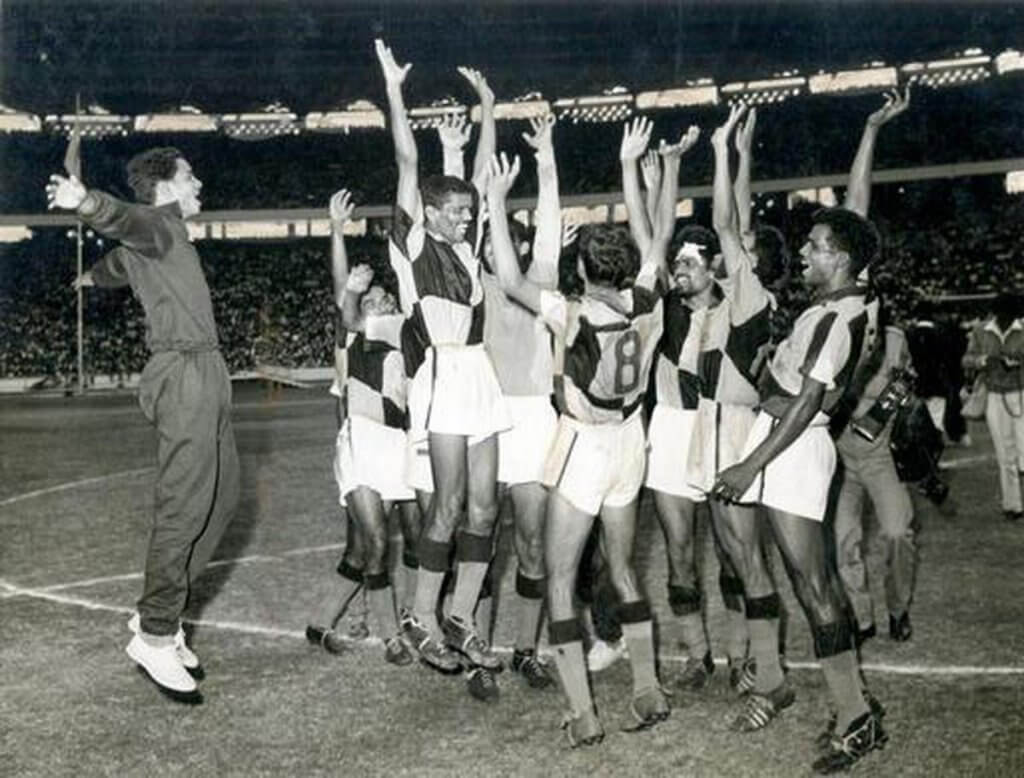
- India national football team celebrating after defeating South Korea in the final of 1962 Asian Games men's football event.
- Location: Jakarta, Indonesia

Highlights
- Most gold medals: Japan 73
- Most total medals: Japan 152
- Medalling NOCs: 15

The 1962 Asian Games, officially known as the Fourth Asian Games, was a multi-sport event held in Jakarta, Indonesia, from 24 August to 4 September 1962. This edition of the Asian Games was a subject of major international controversy when the host nation denied two Asian Games Federation members, Republic of China and Israel, to participate in the Games. Consequently, the International Olympic Committee revoked Indonesia's membership and barred it from participating in the 1964 Summer Olympics in Tokyo. The Games and related infrastructure development projects in Jakarta were heavily funded by the Soviet Union and were given "top priority" by the then-President of Indonesia, Sukarno.

== Medal table ==
* Host nation (Indonesia)

Rank	Nation	Gold	Silver	Bronze	Total
1	Japan (JPN)	73	56	23	152
2	Indonesia (INA)*	11	12	28	51
3	India (IND)	10	13	10	33
4	Pakistan (PAK)	8	11	9	28
5	Philippines (PHI)	7	6	24	37
6	South Korea (KOR)	4	9	10	23
7	Thailand (THA)	2	6	4	12
8	Malaya (MAL)	2	4	9	15
9	Burma (BIR)	2	1	5	8
10	Singapore (SIN)	1	0	2	3
11	Ceylon (CEY)	0	2	3	5
12	Hong Kong (HKG)	0	2	0	2
13	Afghanistan (AFG)	0	0	1	1
13	Cambodia (CAM)	0	0	1	1
13	South Vietnam (VNM)	0	0	1	1
Totals (15 entries)		120	122	130	372
