= Boxing at the 1962 Asian Games – Men's +81 kg =

Boxing competitions

Men's +81 kg at the 1962 Asian Games
- Venue: Senayan Tennis Stadium
- Date: 31 August 1962
- Competitors: 1 from 1 nation

Medalists
gold medal	Barkat Ali	Pakistan

The men's heavyweight (+81 kilograms) event at the 1962 Asian Games took place on 31 August 1962 at Senayan Tennis Stadium, Jakarta, Indonesia.

Two boxers registered for the competition but Chang Lo-pu from Taiwan didn't participate because in solidarity with People's Republic of China, Indonesian immigration officials refused to issue entry visas for the Taiwanese delegation. Barkat Ali of Pakistan won the gold without a fight in the absence of his only would to be opponent.

== Schedule ==
All times are Western Indonesian Time (UTC+07:30)

Date	Time	Event
Friday, 31 August 1962	20:00	Final

== Results ==
Legend

- WO — Won by walkover

Final
Barkat Ali (PAK)	WO
Bye
