= Than Tun (disambiguation) =

Than Tun (1923-2005) was an influential Burmese historian and leading authority in the history of Pagan Dynasty.

Than Tun (Burmese: သန်းထွန်း) as a common Burmese name may also refer to:

- Thakin Than Tun (1911-1968), Burmese politician and leader of Communist Party of Burma
- Salai Than Tun (born 1928), Burmese academic and political dissident
- Than Tun (boxer) (born 1941), Burmese boxer
