= Tsutomu Hanahara =

Japanese wrestler (1940–2024)

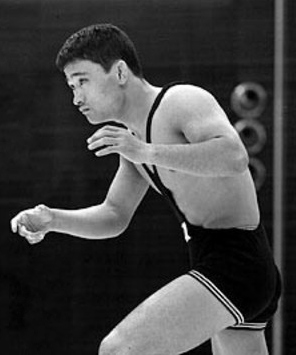
- Hanahara at the 1964 Olympics

Personal information
- Born: January 3, 1940 Shimonoseki, Yamaguchi Prefecture, Japan
- Died: February 5, 2024 (aged 84) Suginami, Tokyo, Japan
- Height: 1.60 m (5 ft 3 in)
- Weight: 58 kg (128 lb)
Medal record
Men's Greco-Roman wrestling
Representing Japan
Olympic Games
Gold medal – first place	1964 Tokyo	Flyweight
World Championships
Bronze medal – third place	1967 New Delhi	57 kg
Asian Games
Silver medal – second place	1962 Jakarta	52 kg

Tsutomu Hanahara (花原 勉, Hanahara Tsutomu; January 3, 1940 – February 5, 2024) was a Japanese wrestler who won a gold medal in the flyweight class at the 1964 Olympics. He competed at the 1958 and 1967 world championships and finished in sixth and third place, respectively.
