= Siraj Din (wrestler) =

Pakistani wrestler (born 1935)

Personal information
- Nationality: Pakistani
- Born: 11 September 1935 (age 90) Lahore, Pakistan

Sport
- Sport: Wrestling
Medal record
Asian Games
Silver medal – second place	1958 Tokyo	Freestyle 62 kg
Silver medal – second place	1962 Jakarta	Greco-Roman 57 kg
Silver medal – second place	1962 Jakarta	Freestyle 57 kg
Commonwealth Games
Gold medal – first place	1962 Perth	Bantamweight
Silver medal – second place	1958 Cardiff	Featherweight

Siraj Din (born 11 September 1935) is a Pakistani former wrestler. He competed at the 1960 Summer Olympics, the 1964 Summer Olympics and the 1962 Asian Games, winning the silver medal in the men's freestyle 57 kg event at the 1962 Asian Games.
