= Cho Chang-jae =

South Korean diver (born 1943)

Personal information
- Nationality: South Korean
- Born: 10 October 1943 (age 82)

Sport
- Sport: Diving
Medal record
Representing South Korea
Asian Games
Bronze medal – third place	1962 Jakarta	10m platform

Cho Chang-jae (born 10 October 1943) is a South Korean diver. He competed in the men's 10 metre platform event at the 1964 Summer Olympics.
