= Wrestling at the 1958 Asian Games – Men's freestyle 62 kg =

Men's freestyle 62 kg at the 1958 Asian Games
- Venue: Korakuen Ice Palace
- Dates: 25–27 May 1958
- Competitors: 6 from 6 nations

Medalists
gold medal	Kiyoshi Nakagawa	Japan
silver medal	Siraj Din	Pakistan
bronze medal	Nasser Givehchi	Iran

The men's freestyle 62 kilograms (featherweight) wrestling competition at the 1958 Asian Games in Tokyo was held from 25 to 27 May 1958.

The competition used a form of negative points tournament, with negative points given for any result short of a fall. Accumulation of 6 negative points eliminated the wrestler. When three wrestlers remained, they advanced to a final round. These 3 wrestlers each faced each other in a round-robin (with earlier results counting, if any had wrestled another before); record within the medal round determined medals, with bad points breaking ties.

== Schedule ==
All times are Japan Standard Time (UTC+09:00)

Date	Time	Event
Sunday, 25 May 1958	11:00	First round
Monday, 26 May 1958	10:00	Second round
Monday, 26 May 1958	19:00	Third round
Tuesday, 27 May 1958	10:00	Fourth round

== Results ==
=== First round ===
TBM		BM		BM		TBM
0	Kiyoshi Nakagawa (JPN)	0	Fall 3:23	4	Ghulam Hazrat (AFG)	4
3	Kang Chung-ho (KOR)	3	Decision	1	Siraj Din (PAK)	1
4	Lazaro Perez (PHI)	4	Fall 9:00	0	Nasser Givehchi (IRN)	0

=== Second round ===
TBM		BM		BM		TBM
1	Kiyoshi Nakagawa (JPN)	1	Decision	3	Kang Chung-ho (KOR)	6
8	Ghulam Hazrat (AFG)	4	Fall 0:45	0	Lazaro Perez (PHI)	4
3	Siraj Din (PAK)	2	Draw	2	Nasser Givehchi (IRN)	2

=== Third round ===
TBM		BM		BM		TBM
2	Kiyoshi Nakagawa (JPN)	1	Decision	3	Nasser Givehchi (IRN)	5
3	Siraj Din (PAK)	0	Fall 3:57	4	Lazaro Perez (PHI)	8

=== Fourth round ===
TBM		BM		BM		TBM
4	Kiyoshi Nakagawa (JPN)	2	Draw	2	Siraj Din (PAK)	5
5	Nasser Givehchi (IRN)				Bye	

== Final standing ==
Rank	Athlete	Round				TBM	FBM
Rank	Athlete	1	2	3	4	TBM	FBM
1st place, gold medalist(s)	Kiyoshi Nakagawa (JPN)	0	1	1	2	4	3
2nd place, silver medalist(s)	Siraj Din (PAK)	1	2	0	2	5	4
3rd place, bronze medalist(s)	Nasser Givehchi (IRN)	0	2	3	Bye	5	5
4	Lazaro Perez (PHI)	4	0	4		8	
5	Kang Chung-ho (KOR)	3	3			6	
6	Ghulam Hazrat (AFG)	4	4			8	
