= Hendrik Brocks =

Indonesian cyclist (1942–2023)

Personal information
- Born: 27 March 1942 Sukabumi, Jawa Barat, Japanese–occupied Dutch East Indies
- Died: 8 March 2023 (aged 80) Sukabumi, Jawa Barat, Indonesia

Cycling career
- Sport: Cycling
Medal record
Men's cycling
Representing Indonesia
Asian Games
Gold medal – first place	1962 Jakarta	Open road race
Gold medal – first place	1962 Jakarta	Team road race
Gold medal – first place	1962 Jakarta	Team time trial

Hendrik Brocks, also known as Hendra Gunawan and nicknamed the Asian Tiger, (27 March 1942 – 8 March 2023) was an Indonesian cyclist. He competed at the 1960 Summer Olympics in Rome, Italy and won three gold medals at the 1962 Asian Games in Jakarta, Indonesia.

== Early life ==
Brocks was born on 27 March 1942 in Sukabumi, Jawa Barat, Japanese–occupied Dutch East Indies. Brocks was first introduced to cycling at elementary school and, after seeing his passion for the sport, his father bought him a second-hand racing bike. He won several championships in various cities with the bike. His cycling exploits earned him the nickname the "Asian Tiger".

== Career ==
Bocks was selected to compete for Indonesia at the 1960 Summer Olympics in Rome, Italy. He was entered in the men's individual road race and the team time trial.

The team time trial took place at the Viale Oceano Pacifico in Rome on 26 August 1960. The four Indonesian riders completed the course in a combined time of two hours 34 minutes 29.98 seconds and finished 26th overall.

The men's road race took place at the Circuito Grottarossa in Rome on 30 August 1960. Brocks did not finish the race.

Following the unsuccessful Olympics, President Sukarno of Indonesia requested that cycling become a priority for the 1962 Asian Games which were to be held in Jakarta.

At the 1962 Asian Games in Jakarta, Indonesia, Brocks won three gold medals. He was successful in the open road race, the team road race and the team time trial.

== Later life and death ==
In 2007, Brocks was diagnosed with Glaucoma which required surgery but he was never able to fully recover his sight.

Brocks died in Sukabumi, Jawa Barat, Indonesia on 8 March 2023, at the age of 80.
