= Jannie Gibson =

Rhodesian boxer (born 1941)

Personal information
- Nationality: Rhodesian
- Born: 15 May 1941 (age 83)

Sport
- Sport: Boxing

John Thomas "Jannie" Gibson (born 15 May 1941) is a Rhodesian former boxer. He competed in the men's light middleweight event at the 1964 Summer Olympics, representing Rhodesia. At the 1964 Summer Olympics, he lost in his first fight to Koji Masuda of Japan in the Round of 32.
