= Israel at the Asian Games =

Israel's competition at the Asian Games

- IOC code: ISR
- NOC: Olympic Committee of Israel
- Medals Ranked 23rd: Gold 18 Silver 16 Bronze 19 Total 53

Summer appearances
- 1954; 1958; 1962; 1966; 1970; 1974

Israel competed at the Asian Games five times, from 1954 to 1974.

== History ==
Israel, after its founding in 1948 began applying to the International Olympic Committee for membership. This was granted in 1952, allowing them to first participate in the Asian Games in 1954.

Israel was part of the Asian Games Federation and participated in the games from 1954 through 1974. In 1981 the Asian Games Federation was organized as the Olympic Council of Asia and for political reasons Israel was excluded. Following this, in 1982, it was voted on to permanently ban Israel from the Asian Games.

Prior to that, Israel was twice unable to participate in the Games of 1962 and 1978, also for political reasons. In 1962 the host country Indonesia, refused to permit the participation of Israel due to political reasons, stating it would cause issues with their relationship with the Arab countries. In July 1976 the 25 members of the Asian Games Federation were canvassed to see if Israel should participate in the 1978 Games, with all 12 responses received voting against the inclusion of Israel.

As of now, Israel participates in the European Games, after joining in the 2015 inaugural edition.

== Medals ==
=== Medals by Asian Games ===
Games	Rank	Gold	Silver	Bronze	Total
(Philippines) 1954 Manila	7	2	1	1	4
(Japan) 1958 Tokyo	14	0	0	2	2
(Indonesia) 1962 Jakarta	did not participate				
(Thailand) 1966 Bangkok	9	3	5	3	11
(Thailand) 1970 Bangkok	6	6	6	5	17
(Iran) 1974 Tehran	6	7	4	8	19
(Thailand) 1978 Bangkok	did not participate				
Total	23	18	16	19	53

=== Medals by sport ===
Games	Gold	Silver	Bronze	Total
Athletics	11	3	5	19
Basketball	2	1	0	3
Diving	1	1	0	2
Fencing	0	0	1	1
Football	0	1	0	1
Shooting	2	4	2	8
Swimming	1	4	6	11
Tennis	1	1	1	3
Weightlifting	0	1	4	5
Totals (9 entries)	18	16	19	53

=== 1954 Asian Games ===
Games	Gold	Silver	Bronze	Total
Athletics	1	0	0	1
Diving	1	1	0	2
Shooting	0	0	1	1
Totals (3 entries)	2	1	1	4

=== 1958 Asian Games ===
Games	Gold	Silver	Bronze	Total
Athletics	0	0	2	2
Totals (1 entries)	0	0	2	2

=== 1966 Asian Games ===
Games	Gold	Silver	Bronze	Total
Athletics	2	0	1	3
Basketball	1	0	0	1
Shooting	0	1	0	1
Swimming	0	4	2	6
Totals (4 entries)	3	5	3	11

=== 1970 Asian Games ===
Games	Gold	Silver	Bronze	Total
Athletics	4	2	1	7
Basketball	0	1	0	1
Shooting	2	3	1	6
Swimming	0	0	3	3
Totals (4 entries)	6	6	5	17

=== 1974 Asian Games ===
Games	Gold	Silver	Bronze	Total
Athletics	4	1	1	6
Basketball	1	0	0	1
Fencing	0	0	1	1
Football	0	1	0	1
Swimming	1	0	1	2
Tennis	1	1	1	3
Weightlifting	0	1	4	5
Totals (7 entries)	7	4	8	19
