= Rusli Hamsjin =

Indonesian cyclist (born 1938)

Personal information
- Born: 29 June 1938 (age 88) Jakarta, Indonesia

Cycling career
- Sport: Cycling
Medal record
Men's cycling
Representing Indonesia
Asian Games
Gold medal – first place	1962 Jakarta	Team time trial

Rusli Hamsjin (born 29 June 1938) is an Indonesian former cyclist. He competed in the individual road race and team time trial events at the 1960 Summer Olympics.
