= Barkat Ali (boxer) =

Pakistani boxer (born 1935)

Personal information
- Nationality: Pakistani
- Born: 1 June 1935 (age 91)

Sport
- Sport: Boxing

Barkat Ali (born 1 June 1935) is an Asian champion former boxer from Pakistan. He also competed in the men's light heavyweight event at the 1964 Summer Olympics.

Barkat was the men's heavyweight boxing champion at the 1962 Asian Games. He also won a bronze medal in the light-heavyweight -81 kg category at the 1966 Asian Games.
