= You Chin Hong =

Cambodian boxer

Personal information
- Nationality: Cambodian
- Born: 4 June 1941 (age 85)

Sport
- Sport: Boxing
Medal record
Representing Cambodia
Men's Boxing
Asian Games
Bronze medal – third place	1962 Jakarta	Men's Lightweight

You Chin Hong (born 4 June 1941) is a Cambodian boxer. He competed in the men's lightweight event at the 1964 Summer Olympics. At the 1964 Summer Olympics, he lost in his first fight to Alex Odhiambo of Uganda.
