= Karu Selvaratnam =

Malaysian sprinter

Personal information
- Nationality: Malaysian
- Born: 28 January 1941 (age 85)

Sport
- Sport: Sprinting
- Event: 4 × 400 metres relay

Karu Selvaratnam (born 28 January 1941) is a Malaysian sprinter. He competed in the men's 4 × 400 metres relay at the 1964 Summer Olympics.
