= Manfredo Alipala =

Filipino boxer

Personal information
- Nickname: Noning
- Nationality: Filipino
- Born: Manfredo Panes Alipala; October 25, 1938 Murcia, Negros Occidental
- Died: October 8, 2006 (age 67) Tarlac City, Philippines
- Height: 5 ft 8 in (173 cm)
- Weight: 148 lb (67 kg)

Boxing career

Boxing record
- Wins: 3
- Win by KO: 1
- Losses: 8
Medal record
Representing the Philippines
Asian Games
Gold medal – first place	1962 Jakarta	Welterweight

Manfredo P. Alipala (October 25, 1938 – October 18, 2006) was a Filipino boxer who competed at the 1964 Summer Olympics.

He won a gold medal at the 1962 Asian Games.

Alipala died in his sleep at his family residence in Barangay San Roque, Tarlac City on October 8, 2006, at age 67. He was buried at the Garden of Peace Memorial Park in Sapang Maragul, also within the city.

== Amateur career ==
=== Olympic Games results ===
1964

- Defeated Al-Kharki Khalid (Iraq) w/o
- Lost to Kichijiro Hamada (Japan) 0-5

== Professional boxing record ==
3 Wins (1 knockouts), 8 Losses (4 knockouts, 1 decision)
Res.	Record	Opponent	Type	Rd., Time	Date	Location	Notes
Lose	3–8	(Japan) Cassius Naito	UD	10	1970-06-10	(Japan) Nagoya, Aichi Prefecture	
Lose	3–7	(Japan) Takeshi Fuji	TKO	10	1969-07-24	(Japan) Tokyo	
Lose	3–6	(South Korea) Choi Sun Kap	TKO	7	1968-03-24	(South Korea) Seoul	
Lose	3–5	(South Korea) Kim Ki-Soo	PTS	12	1968-02-17	(South Korea) Seoul	
Lose	3–4	(Philippines) Jesse Cortez	PTS	10	1967-11-11	(Philippines) Manila, Metro Manila	
Lose	3–3	(Japan) Koji Okano	TKO	8	1967-07-24	(Japan) Tokyo	
Win	3–2	(Japan) Akio Matsunaga	TKO	7	1967-05-15	(Japan) Sendai, Miyagi Prefecture	
Lose	2–2	(Japan) Musashi Nakano	TKO	3	1967-02-26	(Japan) Osaka, Osaka Prefecture	
Lose	2–1	(Philippines) Eduardo Canete	PTS	10	1966-09-04	(Philippines) Araneta Coliseum, Quezon City, Metro Manila	
Win	2–0	(Philippines) Filipino Ravalo	PTS	10	1965-09-19	(Philippines) Araneta Coliseum, Quezon City, Metro Manila	
Win	1–0	(Philippines) Phil Robinson	PTS	6	1965-02-06	(Philippines) Araneta Coliseum, Quezon City, Metro Manila	Professional boxing debut.
