= Lanny Gumulya =

Indonesian diver and entrepreneur (1944–2024)

Personal information
- Nationality: Indonesia
- Born: 13 November 1944 Surakarta, Japanese-occupied Dutch East Indies
- Died: 29 February 2024 (aged 79) Jakarta, Indonesia

Sport
- Country: Indonesia
- Sport: Diving
- Event(s): 3 m springboard 10 m platform
Medal record
Women's diving
Representing Indonesia
Asian Games
Gold medal – first place	1962 Jakarta	3 m springboard
Bronze medal – third place	1962 Jakarta	10 m platform
GANEFO
Gold medal – first place	1963 Jakarta	3 m springboard
Bronze medal – third place	1963 Jakarta	10 m platform

Lanny Gumulya Kartadinata (13 November 1944 – 29 February 2024) was an Indonesian diver and entrepreneur.

== Early life ==
Lanny was born of Chinese descent in Surakarta on 13 November 1944, with the name Goei Giok Lan. She had been interested in sports since she was a child. From 1953 to 1954, she took up swimming. At the age of 10, she was introduced to diving when an American diver came to Solo and showed his skills.

She attended junior high school in Bandung. During her junior high school years, she learned judo from Battling Ong and was able to reach the brown belt level.

== Career ==
In 1959, Lanny began her career in diving under the guidance of coach M. Jasin. During her training, Soekarno gave her the name Gumulya when he visited the training center in Bandung. In the 1961 National Sports Week in Bandung, she won a gold medal in the diving competition for the 3-meter board. Thanks to the gold medal she won at the National Sports Week, she underwent a national training camp for the Asian Games in the Philippines and Japan.

Lanny participated in the 1962 Asian Games in the diving event and won gold medals for the 3-meter board and the 10-meter platform. She also participated in the GANEFO and won gold medals for the 3-meter board and bronze for the 10-meter platform. She also planned to participate in the 1964 Summer Olympics in Tokyo. However, the plan failed because the Indonesian contingent withdrew from the Olympics.

== Post-diving career ==
In 1964, Lanny decided to retire from sports. She then continued her studies at the Faculty of Medicine of the University of Indonesia in 1966. She married Charlie Kartadinata in 1966. From her marriage, she had six children. She then moved to Malaga and founded a restaurant called "Mandarin." She then returned to Indonesia and ventured into the printing business in Palmerah. In 1981, she declined KONI's offer to become a coach.

Lanny carried the torch at the Gelora Bung Karno Stadium during the opening of the 2018 Asian Games. On her 78th birthday, Melanie Kartadinata released a biography of Lanny Gumulya as Lanny's birthday present.

Lanny died on 29 February 2024, at the age of 79. Her body was cremated on 4 March.
