= Kiyoshi Tanabe =

Japanese boxer (born 1940)

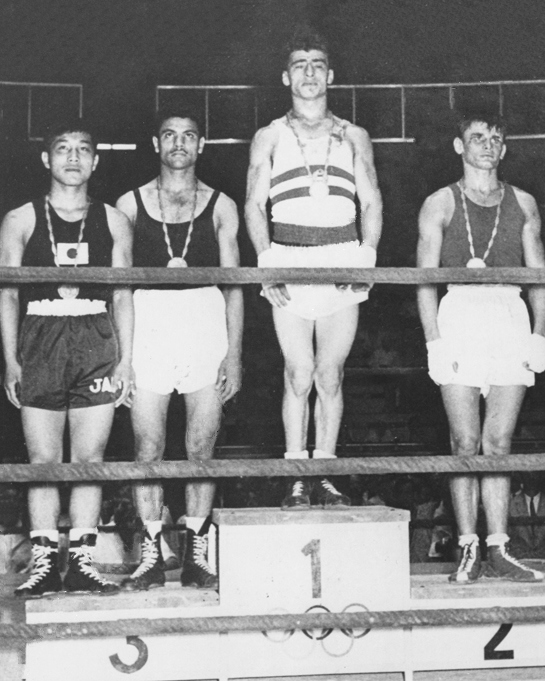
- Tanabe (extreme left) at the 1960 Olympics

Personal information
- Born: October 10, 1940 (age 86) Aomori City, Japan
- Height: 159 cm (5 ft 3 in)
- Weight: Flyweight

Boxing career
- Stance: Orthodox

Boxing record
- Total fights: 22
- Wins: 21
- Win by KO: 5
- Losses: 0
- Draws: 1
Medal record
Representing Japan
Olympic Games
Bronze medal – third place	1960 Rome	Flyweight
Asian Games
Gold medal – first place	1962 Jakarta	Bantamweight

Kiyoshi Tanabe (田辺 清, born October 10, 1940) is a retired Japanese boxer who won a bronze medal at the 1960 Olympics.

== Biography ==
As an amateur Tanabe won a bronze medal at the 1960 Olympics, becoming the first Japanese boxer to win an Olympic medal. His amateur record was 115-5 (30RSC). He made his professional debut in 1963, and won the Japanese flyweight title in 1965, which he defended twice before vacating. In February 1967, he fought WBA & WBC flyweight champion Horacio Accavallo in a non-title match, and won by 6th-round TKO.

Tanabe was scheduled to get his first world title shot in July 1967, and expectations heightened around the talented fighter. However, it was discovered that he had suffered a detached retina in his right eye, which forced him into retirement. He had surgery on his right eye, but lost his vision two years later.
