= Koji Masuda =

Japanese boxer (born 1944)

Personal information
- Nationality: Japanese
- Born: 1 February 1944 (age 81)

Sport
- Sport: Boxing

Koji Masuda (益田 弘二, Masuda Kōji; born 1 February 1944) is a Japanese boxer. He competed in the men's light middleweight event at the 1964 Summer Olympics. At the 1964 Summer Olympics, he defeated Jannie Gibson of Rhodesia in the Round of 32 before losing to Joseph Gonzales of France in the Round of 16.
