= Kim Duk-pal =

South Korean boxer (born 1942)

Personal information
- Nationality: South Korean
- Born: 23 January 1942 (age 83)

Sport
- Sport: Boxing

Kim Duk-pal (born 23 January 1942) is a South Korean boxer. He competed in the men's middleweight event at the 1964 Summer Olympics. At the 1964 Summer Olympics, he lost to Ion Monea of Romania.
