= Muhammad Safdar (boxer) =

Pakistani boxer (born 1934)

Personal information
- Full name: Malik Muhammad safdar kala
- Nationality: Pakistani from dulmial village of chakwal
- Born: 1 September 1934 (age 91) Dulmial, Chakwal District, Punjab, Pakistan

Sport
- Sport: Boxing

Muhammad Safdar (born 1 September 1934) is a Pakistani former boxer. He competed in the men's light middleweight category (−71 kg) at the 1956 Summer Olympics and the 1960 Summer Olympics. At the 1960 Summer Olympics, he lost to Giulio Saraudi of Italy in the round of 16.
