= Johnny Bolang =

Indonesian boxer (born 1941)

Personal information
- Nationality: Indonesian
- Born: 8 August 1941 (age 84) Surabaya, Indonesia

Sport
- Sport: Boxing

Johnny Bolang (born 8 August 1941) is an Indonesian boxer. He competed in the men's lightweight event at the 1960 Summer Olympics.
