= Sukda Songsang =

Thai boxer

Personal information
- Nationality: Thai
- Born: 24 October 1941 (age 83)

Sport
- Sport: Boxing

Sukda Songsang (born 24 October 1941) is a Thai boxer. He competed in the men's welterweight event at the 1964 Summer Olympics.
