= Than Tun (boxer) =

Burmese boxer

Personal information
- Nationality: Burmese
- Born: 10 May 1941 (age 84); Mandalay, British Burma

Sport
- Sport: Boxing

Than Tun (born 10 May 1941) is a Burmese boxer. He competed in the men's featherweight event at the 1960 Summer Olympics. At the 1960 Summer Olympics, in his lone bout he lost to William Meyers of South Africa by decision in the Round of 32.
