= Kichijiro Hamada =

Japanese boxer (1942–2013)

Personal information
- Nationality: Japanese
- Born: 25 October 1942; Matsuyama, Ehime Prefecture, Japan
- Died: 22 September 2013 (aged 70)

Sport
- Sport: Boxing

Kichijiro Hamada (浜田 吉次郎, Hamada Kichijirō; 25 October 1942 – 22 September 2013) was a Japanese boxer. He competed in the men's welterweight event at the 1964 Summer Olympics.
