= Asian Games Federation =

Governing body of sports in Asia, 1948–1982

- Abbreviation: AGF
- Successor: Olympic Council of Asia
- Formation: 13 February 1949
- Dissolved: 16 November 1982
- Type: Sports federation
- Purpose: Organizing the Asian Games
- Region served: Asia
- Members: Asian National Olympic Committees

The Asian Games Federation (AGF) was the governing body of sports in Asia from 1949 to 1982. The federation was disbanded on 16 November 1982 in New Delhi and succeeded by the Olympic Council of Asia. The AGF was responsible for the organisation of the Asian Games from 1951 to 1982. The Federation was established on 13 February 1949, in a meeting held in Patiala House in New Delhi.

== Establishment ==
In March 1947, Jawaharlal Nehru, who later became the first prime minister of India, held the Asian Relations Conference in New Delhi—a meeting with a prospect to bring the possibility of Asian Games under the attention of participating countries. Before the conference, Guru Dutt Sondhi, who was the member of the International Olympic Committee for India, encouraged Yadavindra Singh, Maharaja of Patiala and the then-president of the Indian Olympic Association (IOA), to communicate with meeting attendees to establish the Asian Games Federation. The proposal was not acknowledged by some representatives and the rest, who approved, refused to make any commitment.

In July 1947, the IOA, which initially was advocating the organisation of Games, retracted its patronage for unknown reasons. Sondhi found an alternative; rather than organising a multi-sport event, for which he needed an approval of the IOA, he opted for a single event championship titled the Asian Athletic Championships—a track and field event. Sondhi, who was also the president of the Amateur Athletic Federation of India (AAFI) (now Athletics Federation of India), received the consent of federation in February 1948. Yadavindra, on the request of Sondhi, became the president of the organising committee for the Championship, and Sondhi took the position of chairman. In early July, formal invitations were sent to various Asian countries, backed by the letter from the AAFI. But the response was not positive as there was a scheduling conflict with the 1948 Summer Olympics, which were scheduled from 29 July.

=== Meeting in London ===
During the 1948 Olympic Games, Sondhi held a meeting on 8 August 1948, at Mount Royal Hotel in London. Invitations were sent to all the Asian National Olympic Committees present in London at that time. Chief Managers of Korea, China, Philippines, Singapore, Burma, Ceylon, India, Pakistan, Afghanistan, Iran, Iraq, Lebanon and Syria were called for the meeting, but only representatives from Burma, Ceylon, China, India, Philippines, and Korea attended. Sondhi made two proposals: first, to organise an Asian Athletic Championship in February 1949 in New Delhi, and second, to establish the Asian Games Federation, based on the IOC model. Founder of the Philippine Amateur Athletic Federation and first Filipino member of the International Olympic Committee Jorge B. Vargas stoutly backed the second proposal, and the first proposal was accepted by the attendees with an amendment. For the further development of the federation, a decision was made to conduct a meeting during the Championship in New Delhi in February 1949, and a sub-committee, consisting representatives from four nations, was appointed to draft the constitution and ordinances of the federation.

=== Meeting in Delhi ===
The Asian Athletics Championship was not realised due to "unsettled conditions" and economic difficulties of participating nations, but a meeting was organised at the Patiala House, in Delhi, among the representatives of nine Asian nations, on 12 and 13 February 1949. The meeting was attended by the representatives of Afghanistan, Burma, Ceylon, India, Indonesia, Nepal, Pakistan, Philippines and Thailand. The drafted constitution, presented by the sub-committee, was again revised as per the Olympic Charter—the constitution of the International Olympic Committee—and accredited. To avoid the ambiguity generated by the literal meaning of term "athletic", sub-committee rectified the primitively proposed title of the federation from Asian Amateur Athletic Federation to Asian Games Federation. Afghanistan, Burma, India, Pakistan, and the Philippines became the first five members of the Asian Games Federation after signing the constitution in its full term; the other four attendees also signed it, but it still needed the ratification by their governments or their National Sports Associations or National Olympic Committees. The federation elected Yadavindra Singh as the president, Jorge B. Vargas as vice-president, and G. D. Sondhi as secretary treasurer.

== See also ==
- Commonwealth Games Federation
- International Olympic Committee
