= Philippines at the 1962 Asian Games =

- IOC code: PHI
- NOC: Philippine Olympic Committee
- Website: www.olympic.ph (in English)

in Jakarta
- Medals Ranked 3rd: Gold 7 Silver 6 Bronze 24 Total 37

Asian Games appearances (overview)
- 1951; 1954; 1958; 1962; 1966; 1970; 1974; 1978; 1982; 1986; 1990; 1994; 1998; 2002; 2006; 2010; 2014; 2018; 2022; 2026

The Philippines participated in the 1962 Asian Games held in Jakarta, Indonesia from August 24 to September 4, 1962. Ranked 3rd with 7 gold medals, 4 silver medals and 16 bronze medals with a total of 27 over-all medals.

== Asian Games performance ==
Mona Sulaiman copped three gold medals when she topped the 100 and 200-meter dash and anchored the national squad in the women's 4x100-meter finals. Philippine boxing won their first gold medal when Filipino welterweight boxer Manfredo Alipala, a 24-year old National Open champion from Far Eastern University, outpunched Japan's Kichijiro Hamada in the finals.

The Philippine basketball team captured its fourth championship in the Asian Games competitions. In tennis, Johnny Jose bagged the Asiad men's tennis singles gold medal.

== Medalists ==
=== Gold ===
No.	Medal	Name	Sport	Event
1	Gold	Remegio Vista; Isaac Gomez; Claro Pellosis; Rogelio Onofre	Athletics	Men's 4x100m Relay
2	Gold	Mona Sulaiman	Athletics	Women's 100m
3	Gold	Mona Sulaiman	Athletics	Women's 200m
4	Gold	Aida Molinos; Francisca Sanopal; Inocencia Solis; Mona Sulaiman	Athletics	Women's 4x100m Relay
5	Gold	Engracio Arazas; Kurt Bachmann; Narciso Bernardo; Geronimo Cruz; Manuel Jocson; Alfonso Marquez; Carlos Loyzaga (C); Roel Nadurata; Eduardo Pacheco; Cristobal Ramas; Alberto Reynoso; Edgardo Roque; Joselino Roa; Coach: Enrique Crame	Basketball	Men's Team
6	Gold	Manfredo Alipala	Boxing	Welterweight 67kg
7	Gold	Johnny Jose	Tennis	Men's Singles

=== Silver ===
No.	Medal	Name	Sport	Event
1	Silver	Francisca Sanopal	Athletics	Women's 80m Hurdles
2	Silver	Adolfo Feliciano	Shooting	50m Rifle 3
3	Silver	Sampang Hassan; Antonio Saloso; Amir Hussin Hamsain; Roosevelt Abdulgafur	Swimming	Men's 4x100m Medley Relay
4	Silver	Connie Paredes; Corazon Lozada; Gertrudes Lozada; Haydee Coloso-Espino	Swimming	Women's 4x100m Freestyle
5	Silver	Johnny Jose; Reymundo Deyro	Tennis	Men's Doubles
6	Silver	Johnny Jose; Reymundo Deyro; Miguel Dungo; Guillermo Hernandez	Tennis	Men's Team

=== Bronze ===
No.	Medal	Name	Sport	Event
1	Bronze	Rogelio Onofre	Athletics	Men's 100m
2	Bronze	Ciriaco Baronda	Athletics	Men's High Jump
3	Bronze	Mona Sulaiman	Athletics	Women's Shot Put
4	Bronze	Josephine de la Viña	Athletics	Women's Discus Throw
5	Bronze	Jose Ramirez	Boxing	Bantamweight 54kg
6	Bronze	Egino Grafia	Boxing	Featherweight 57kg
7	Bronze	Catalino Arpon	Boxing	Lightweight 60kg
8	Bronze	Sampang Hassan	Swimming	Men's 100m Backstroke
9	Bronze	Rolando Landrito	Swimming	Men's 200m Breaststroke
10	Bronze	Amir Hussin Hamsain	Swimming	Men's 100m Butterfly
11	Bronze	Amir Hussin Hamsain	Swimming	Men's 200m Butterfly
12	Bronze	Roosevelt Abdulgafur; Bana Sailani; Haylil Said; Victorino Marcelino	Swimming	Men's 4x200m Freestyle Relay
13	Bronze	Haydee Coloso-Espino	Swimming	Women's 100m Freestyle
14	Bronze	Corazon Lozada	Swimming	Women's 200m Freestyle
15	Bronze	Corazon Lozada	Swimming	Women's 400m Freestyle
16	Bronze	Gertrudes Lozada	Swimming	Women's 100m Butterfly
17	Bronze	Tessie Lozada; Dolores Agustin; Gertrudes Lozada; Haydee Coloso-Espino	Swimming	Women's 4x100m Medley Relay
18	Bronze	Miguel Dungo; Guillermo Hernandez	Tennis	Men's Doubles
19	Bronze	Patricia Yngayo	Tennis	Women's Singles
20	Bronze	Desideria Ampon	Tennis	Women's Singles
21	Bronze	Desideria Ampon; Patricia Yngayo	Tennis	Women's Doubles
22	Bronze	Desideria Ampon; Patricia Yngano	Tennis	Women's Team
23	Bronze	Desideria Ampon; Miguel Dungo	Tennis	Mixed Doubles
24	Bronze	Julius Baldesimo; Teofilo Benito; Guillermo Blanco; Domingo Cuenca; Agapito Custodio; Rodolfo Gonzales; Ruben Labay; Isaac Limosnero; Florencio Longakit; Rodolfo Manuel; Ildefonso Mariquit; Alfredo Mercado; Francisco Orante	Volleyball	Men's Volleyball Nine-a-side

=== Multiple ===
Name	Sport	Gold	Silver	Bronze	Total
Mona Sulaiman	Athletics	3	0	1	4
Johnny Jose	Tennis	1	2	0	3
Francisca Sanopal	Athletics	1	1	0	2
Rogelio Onofre	Athletics	1	0	1	2
Reymundo Deyro	Tennis	0	2	0	2
Amir Hussin Hamsain	Swimming	0	1	2	3
Corazon Lozada	Swimming	0	1	2	3
Gertrudes Lozada	Swimming	0	1	2	3
Haydee Coloso-Espino	Swimming	0	1	2	3
Miguel Dungo	Tennis	0	1	2	3
Guillermo Hernandez	Tennis	0	1	1	2
Sampang Hassan	Swimming	0	1	1	2
Roosevelt Abdulgafur	Swimming	0	1	1	2
Desideria Ampon	Tennis	0	0	4	4
Patricia Yngayo	Tennis	0	0	3	3

== Medal summary ==
=== Medals by sports ===
Sport	Gold	Silver	Bronze	Total
Athletics	4	1	4	9
Tennis	1	2	6	9
Boxing	1	0	3	4
Basketball	1	0	0	1
Swimming	0	2	10	12
Shooting	0	1	0	1
Volleyball	0	0	1	1
Totals (7 entries)	7	6	24	37
