= India at the 1962 Asian Games =

Sporting event delegation

- IOC code: IND
- NOC: Indian Olympic Association

in Jakarta
- Medals Ranked 3rd: Gold 10 Silver 13 Bronze 10 Total 33

Asian Games appearances (overview)
- 1951; 1954; 1958; 1962; 1966; 1970; 1974; 1978; 1982; 1986; 1990; 1994; 1998; 2002; 2006; 2010; 2014; 2018; 2022; 2026

India participated in the 1962 Asian Games held in the city of Jakarta, Indonesia from 24 August 1962 to 4 September 1962. India ranked 3rd with 12 gold medals in this edition of the Asiad.

== Medals by sport ==
Sport	Gold	Silver	Bronze	Total
Athletics	5	5	4	14
Boxing	1	0	2	3
Hockey	0	1	0	1
Football	1	0	0	1
Wrestling	3	6	3	12
Shooting	0	0	1	1
Volleyball	0	1	0	1
Total	10	13	10	33

== Football ==
Head coach: (India) Syed Abdul Rahim

No.	Pos.	Player	Date of birth (age)	Caps	Goals	Club
	GK	Pradyut Barman				(All India Football Federation) Railways
	GK	Peter Thangaraj	24 December 1935 (aged 26)			(All India Football Federation) Mohammedan Sporting
	DF	Menon Chandrashekar	10 July 1935 (aged 27)			(All India Football Federation) Bombay
	DF	Tarlok Singh				(All India Football Federation) Services
	MF	Fortunato Franco				(All India Football Federation) Bombay
	DF	Jarnail Singh	20 February 1936 (aged 26)			(All India Football Federation) Mohun Bagan
	MF	Ram Bahadur Chhetri	15 February 1937 (aged 25)			(All India Football Federation) East Bengal
	FW	Pradip Kumar Banerjee	23 June 1936 (aged 26)			(All India Football Federation) Railways
	FW	Mohammed Yousuf Khan	5 August 1937 (aged 25)			(All India Football Federation) Hyderabad City Police
	FW	D.M.K. Afzal				(All India Football Federation) Hyderabad City Police
	FW	Chuni Goswami (c)	15 January 1938 (aged 24)			(All India Football Federation) Mohun Bagan
	FW	Tulsidas Balaram	4 October 1936 (aged 25)			(All India Football Federation) East Bengal
	MF	Prasanta Sinha				(All India Football Federation) Bengal
	FW	D. Ethiraj	1 July 1934 (aged 28)			(All India Football Federation) Services
	FW	Arumai Nayagam				(All India Football Federation) Mohun Bagan
	DF	Arun Ghosh	7 July 1941 (aged 21)			(All India Football Federation) East Bengal

=== Preliminary round ===
Team	Pld	W	D	L	GF	GA	GR	Pts
South Korea	3	3	0	0	6	2	3.000	6
India	3	2	0	1	6	3	2.000	4
Japan	3	1	0	2	3	4	0.750	2
Thailand	3	0	0	3	4	10	0.400	0

Source: RSSSF
26 August 1962

India	0–2	South Korea
		Chung Soon-choon 30'; Cha Tae-sung

Senayan Main Stadium, Jakarta
Attendance: 95,000

28 August 1962

Thailand	1–4	India
	Report	Banerjee; Goswami; Balaram

Jakarta

29 August 1962

India	2–0	Japan
Banerjee 54'; Balaram 70'	Report

Jakarta

=== Semifinals ===
1 September 1962

South Vietnam	2–3	India
Phan Duong Cam 52' (pen.); Do Thol Vinh 64'	Report	Goswami 13', 75'; J. Singh 41'

Jakarta

=== Gold medal match ===
4 September 1962

India	2–1	South Korea
Banerjee 74'; J. Singh 87'	Report	Cha Tae-sung 45'

Senayan Main Stadium, Jakarta
Attendance: 100,000
Referee: J. Ferguson (Singapore)
