= South Korea at the 1962 Asian Games =

- IOC code: KOR
- NOC: Korean Olympic Committee

in Jakarta
- Competitors: 137 in 11 sports
- Officials: 36
- Medals Ranked 5th: Gold 4 Silver 4 Bronze 7 Total 15

Asian Games appearances (overview)
- 1954; 1958; 1962; 1966; 1970; 1974; 1978; 1982; 1986; 1990; 1994; 1998; 2002; 2006; 2010; 2014; 2018; 2022; 2026

South Korea (IOC designation:Korea) participated in the 1962 Asian Games held in Jakarta, Indonesia from August 24, 1962, to September 4, 1962.

== Medal summary ==
=== Medal table ===
Sport	Gold	Silver	Bronze	Total
Boxing	3	1	1	5
Shooting	1	0	2	3
Volleyball	0	3	0	3
Table tennis	0	2	1	3
Wrestling	0	1	2	3
Cycling	0	1	1	2
Football	0	1	0	1
Basketball	0	0	1	1
Diving	0	0	1	1
Swimming	0	0	1	1
Totals (10 entries)	4	9	10	23
