= Indonesia at the 1962 Asian Games =

- IOC code: INA
- NOC: Indonesian Olympic Committee
- Website: www.nocindonesia.or.id (in English)

in Jakarta
- Medals Ranked 2nd: Gold 11 Silver 12 Bronze 28 Total 51

Asian Games appearances (overview)
- 1951; 1954; 1958; 1962; 1966; 1970; 1974; 1978; 1982; 1986; 1990; 1994; 1998; 2002; 2006; 2010; 2014; 2018; 2022; 2026

Indonesia participated in the 1962 Asian Games held in Jakarta, Indonesia from August 24, 1962 to September 4, 1962. It was ranked second in medal count, with 11 gold medals, 12 silver medals and 28 bronze medals, for a total of 51 medals.

== Medal summary ==
=== Medal table ===
| Sport | Gold | Silver | Bronze | Total |
|---|---|---|---|---|
| Badminton | 5 | 3 | 3 | 11 |
| Cycling | 3 | 0 | 1 | 4 |
| Athletics | 2 | 0 | 6 | 8 |
| Diving | 1 | 0 | 2 | 3 |
| Swimming | 0 | 3 | 6 | 9 |
| Boxing | 0 | 2 | 2 | 4 |
| Shooting | 0 | 2 | 1 | 3 |
| Tennis | 0 | 1 | 3 | 4 |
| Water polo | 0 | 1 | 0 | 1 |
| Volleyball | 0 | 0 | 2 | 2 |
| Wrestling | 0 | 0 | 2 | 2 |
| Total | 11 | 12 | 28 | 51 |

=== Medalists ===
| Medal | Name | Sport | Event | Ref |
|---|---|---|---|---|
| Gold | Mohammad Sarengat | Athletics | Men's 100 m | |
| Gold | Mohammad Sarengat | Athletics | Men's 110 m hurdles | |
| Gold | Tutang Djamaluddin; Liem Tjeng Kiang; Ferry Sonneville; Tan Joe Hok; Abdul Patah Unang | Badminton | Men's team | |
| Gold | Goei Kiok Nio; Happy Herowati; Corry Kawilarang; Retno Kustijah; Minarni | Badminton | Women's team | |
| Gold | Tan Joe Hok | Badminton | Men's singles | |
| Gold | Minarni | Badminton | Women's singles | |
| Gold | Minarni; Retno Kustijah | Badminton | Women's doubles | |
| Gold | Hendrik Brocks | Cycling | Men's open road race | |
| Gold | Hendrik Brocks; Aming Priatna; Wahju Wahdini | Cycling | Team road race | |
| Gold | Hendrik Brocks; Aming Priatna; Hasjim Roesli; Wahju Wahdini | Cycling | Team time trial | |
| Gold | Lanny Gumulya | Diving | Women's 3 m springboard | |
| Silver | Corry Kawilarang | Badminton | Women's singles | |
| Silver | Tan Joe Hok; Liem Tjeng Kiang | Badminton | Men's doubles | |
| Silver | Corry Kawilarang; Happy Herowati | Badminton | Women's doubles | |
| Silver | Frans Soplanit | Boxing | Men's bantamweight (54 kg) | |
| Silver | Paruhum Siregar | Boxing | Men's Light heavyweight (81 kg) | |
| Silver | Lely Sampurno | Shooting | 50 m pistol | |
| Silver | Elias Joseph Lessy | Shooting | 300 m rifle 3 positions | |
| Silver | Poo Boen Tiong; Abdul Rasjid; Sudarman; Achmad Dimyati | Swimming | Men's 4x200 m freestyle relay | |
| Silver | Iris Tobing | Swimming | Women's 100 m breaststroke | |
| Silver | Oey Lian Nio; Iris Tobing; Lie Lan Hoa; Enny Nuraeni | Swimming | Women's 4x100 m medley relay | |
| Silver | Vonny Djoa; Mien Suhadi; Jooce Suwarimbo | Tennis | Women's team | |
| Silver | Abdul Ghofur; Guus Mauri; Benjamin Idris; Mingky Lias; Welly Agus Salim; Boen Swan Tjiang; Tjong Kian Liem; John Sjahrizal; Jusron Lamisi | Water polo | Men | |
| Bronze | Mohammad Sarengat | Athletics | Men's 200 m | |
| Bronze | Gurnam Singh | Athletics | Men's 10,000 m | |
| Bronze | Awang Papilaya | Athletics | Men's long jump | |
| Bronze | Awang Papilaya | Athletics | Men's triple jump | |
| Bronze | Soewatini | Athletics | Women's 800 m | |
| Bronze | Soeratmi; Ernawati; Willy Tomasoa; Wiewiek Machwijar | Athletics | Women's 4x100 m relay | |
| Bronze | Ferry Sonneville | Badminton | Men's singles | |
| Bronze | Happy Herowati | Badminton | Women's singles | |
| Bronze | Tutang Djamaluddin; Abdul Patah Unang | Badminton | Men's doubles | |
| Bronze | Johnny Bolang | Boxing | Light welterweight (63.5 kg) | |
| Bronze | Alex Abast | Boxing | Men's Middleweight (75 kg) | |
| Bronze | Aming Priatna | Cycling | Open road race | |
| Bronze | Billy Gumulya | Diving | Men's 3 m springboard | |
| Bronze | Lanny Gumulya | Diving | Women's 10 m platform | |
| Bronze | John Posuma | Shooting | 25 m rapid fire pistol | |
| Bronze | Achmad Dimyati | Swimming | Men's 100 m freestyle | |
| Bronze | Poo Boen Tiong | Swimming | Men's 200 m backstroke | |
| Bronze | Kemal Lubis; Abdul Rasjid; Sudarman; Achmad Dimyati | Swimming | 4x100 m medley relay | |
| Bronze | Oey Lian Nio | Swimming | Women's 100 m backstroke | |
| Bronze | Iris Tobing | Swimming | Women's 200 m breaststroke | |
| Bronze | Enny Nuraeni; Lie Lan Hoa; Lie Mu Lhan; Lie Ying Hoa | Swimming | Women's 4x100 freestyle relay | |
| Bronze | Mien Suhadi; Jooce Suwarimbo | Tennis | Women's doubles | |
| Bronze | Sofyan Mudjirat; Jooce Suwarimbo | Tennis | Mixed doubles | |
| Bronze | Sofyan Mudjirat; N. Sanusi; Soetarjo Soegiarto; K. Tjokrosaputro | Tennis | Men's team | |
| Bronze | Evy Sofia Achid; Jane Gunawan; Paulina Lessil; Helena Marwati; Joan Paulini; Rasni Rasmo; Lenny Sahertian; Augustien Siahaija; Hartaty Soekardjo; Amy Surjotjokro; Tan Lan Ing; Tjia Boet Nio | Volleyball | Women | |
| Bronze | Evy Sofia Achid; Jane Gunawan; Meity Joseph; Paulina Lessil; Helena Marwati; Joan Paulini; Rasni Rasmo; Hetty Rosadi; Lenny Sahertian; Augustien Siahaija; Hartaty Soekardjo; Amy Surjotjokro; Tan Lan Ing; Andi Tja Tjambolang; Tjia Boet Nio | Volleyball | Women's nine-a-side | |
| Bronze | Mujari | Wrestling | Men's Greco-Roman 52 kg | |
| Bronze | Rachman Firdaus | Wrestling | Men's Greco-Roman 63 kg | |
