= UTC+07:30 =

Former time zone

- Time zone

UTC offset
- UTC: UTC+07:30

Current time
- 19:29, 9 October 2026 UTC+07:30 [refresh]

Central meridian
- 112.5 degrees E

Date-time group
- G*

UTC+07:30 is an identifier for a time offset from UTC of +07:30. It was formerly used in Indonesia, Malaysia, and Singapore.

== History ==
=== Use in Indonesia ===
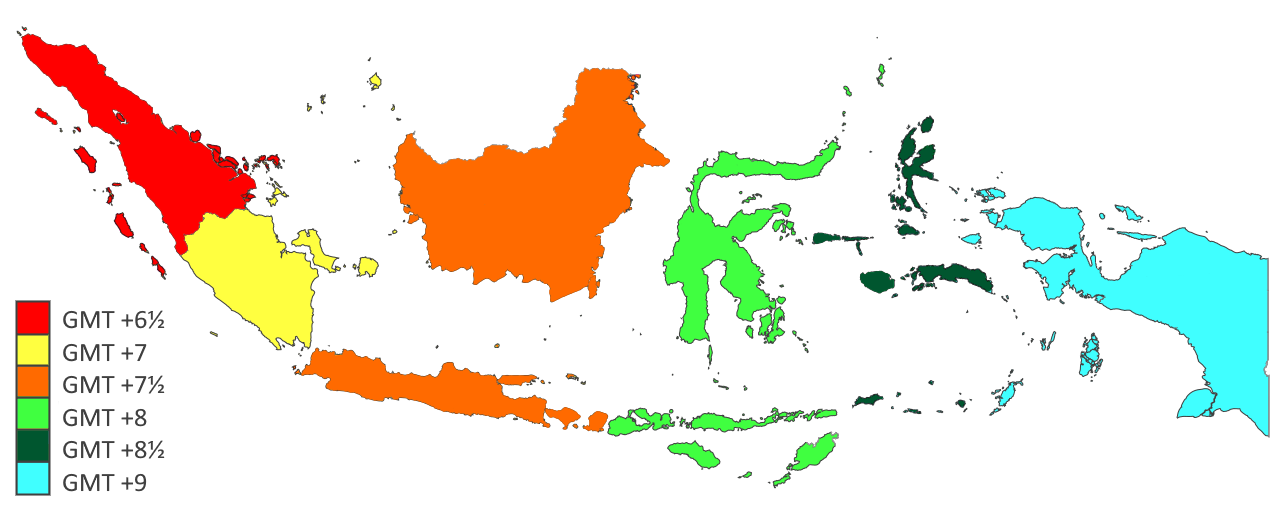
Time zones of Indonesia, 1932-1942 and 1950-1963. UTC+07:30 is shown in orange.

From 1932 through 1942 through Staatsblad no. 412 (1932), and again from 1950 through 1963 through Presidential Instruction no. 152 (1950), this time zone was used in the Indonesian regions of Java and Madura, Bali, and Kalimantan (the Indonesian part of Borneo). Presently, while Java and Madura, West Kalimantan, and Central Kalimantan use UTC+07:00, Bali, East Kalimantan (including Nusantara), North Kalimantan, and South Kalimantan use UTC+08:00.

=== Use in Peninsular Malaysia and Singapore ===
UTC+07:30 was also used, initially as daylight saving time, and later as standard time, in Malaya (the Malay Peninsula) and Singapore. Between 1941 and 1942 before the Japanese occupation, and from 1945 to 1965 after the occupation Malaya and Singapore used UTC+07:30 as daylight saving time. It was later in 1965 when Singapore decided to declare UTC+07:30 as its standard time.

The Malaysian government announced in December 1981 that it would adjust Peninsular Malaysia’s time by 30 minutes on 1 January 1982 in order to keep common time with East Malaysia. In view of Singapore’s close relations with Malaysia and also to prevent confusion for travellers and businessmen, the Singapore government made a very quick decision to follow suit. Since then, UTC+08:00 has been the time zone for both countries.

== See also ==
- Singapore Standard Time
- Time in Malaysia
- UTC+07:20
