= Japan at the 1962 Asian Games =

- IOC code: JPN
- NOC: Japanese Olympic Committee

in Jakarta
- Medals Ranked 1st: Gold 73 Silver 65 Bronze 23 Total 161

Asian Games appearances (overview)
- 1951; 1954; 1958; 1962; 1966; 1970; 1974; 1978; 1982; 1986; 1990; 1994; 1998; 2002; 2006; 2010; 2014; 2018; 2022; 2026

Japan participated in the 1962 Asian Games held in Jakarta, Indonesia from August 24, 1962 to September 4, 1962. This country was ranked 1st with 73 gold medals, 65 silver medals and 23 bronze medals with a total of 152 medals to secure its top spot in the medal tally.
