= 1962 Asian Games =

Multi-sport event in Jakarta, Indonesia

IV Asian Games
- Host city: Jakarta, Indonesia
- Motto: Ever Onward (Indonesian: Madju Terus)
- Nations: 15
- Athletes: 1,460
- Events: 120 in 13 sports
- Opening: 24 August 1962
- Closing: 4 September 1962
- Opened by: Sukarno; President of Indonesia
- Closed by: Hamengkubuwono IX; President of the Asian Games Federation
- Athlete's Oath: Ferry Sonneville
- Torch lighter: Effendi Saleh
- Main venue: Gelora Bung Karno Stadium

The 1962 Asian Games (Indonesian: Pesta Olahraga Asia 1962) also known as the 4th Asian Games, IV Asiad, and Jakarta 1962, were the fourth edition of pan-Asian multi-sport event sanctioned by the Asian Games Federation (AGF). The games were held from 24 August to 4 September 1962, in Jakarta, Indonesia. It was the first international multi-sport event hosted by the then-17-year-old Southeast Asian country. This was the first of two Asian Games hosted by the city: the second was held in 2018, with Palembang as the co-host.

Israel and the Republic of China (ROC) were excluded from the Games, as in solidarity with People's Republic of China and fellow-Arab countries , Indonesian immigration officials refused to issue entry visas for the Israeli and Taiwanese delegations.

It was a breach of the rules of the AGF, and Indonesia's own promise to invite all AGF members, including those with whom it had no diplomatic relations (Israel and Republic Of China).

As a result, Indonesia was suspended from the International Olympic Committee, and were subsequently excluded from the 1964 Summer Olympics. Indonesia responded to this punishment by hosting the Games of the New Emerging Forces in 1963.

A total number of 1,460 athletes, coming from 17 countries, competed in this Asiad, where badminton made its debut.

== Bid ==
On 23 May 1958, voting for the 1962 host took place in Tokyo, Japan, before the 1958 Asian Games. The Asian Games Federation council voted 22–20 in favour of the Indonesian capital over Pakistani city of Karachi, the only other candidate.

1962 Asian Games bidding result
City	Nation	Votes
Jakarta	Indonesia	22
Karachi	Pakistan	20

== Games perceived as Indonesian pride ==
Indonesia, only recently out from the shackles of colonialism, saw the fourth Asian games as its national pride. On 9 April 1961, President Sukarno, while referring to these games, said in Bandung:

We wish to become a new Indonesian man who can face the world with open eyes, upright, with a strong physique, strong mentally and spiritually. Thus, Indonesians should not only become stronger and more healthy, and therefore better workers (and soldiers), but also develop greater self-consciousness now that they were an independent people.

Keeping this principle in mind, it acquired a loan of 12.5 million US dollars from Russia. With the help of Russian experts, a giant stadium was built, which could accommodate 100,000 spectators. Jakarta was renovated, and the efforts at renewal included complete removal of beggars and prostitutes. Indonesian pride was so high at that time, that it did not invite Israel and Taiwan despite both being members of the Asian Games Federation [AGF].

== Venues ==
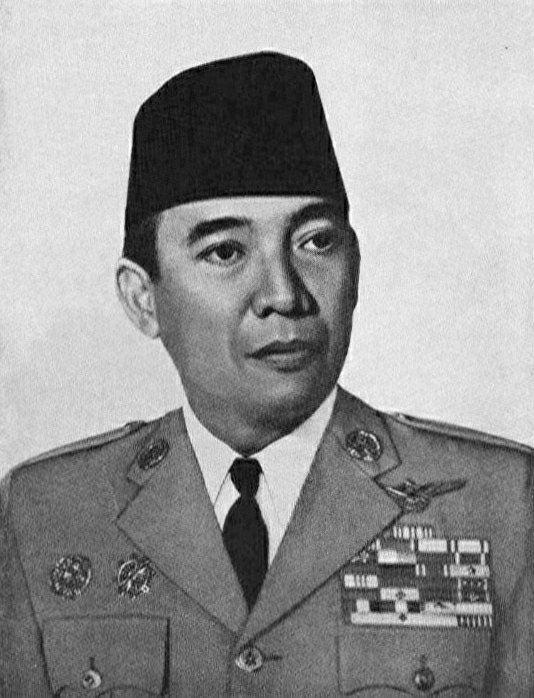
President Sukarno opened this Asiad.

All but three official sports were held inside or around the Gelora Bung Karno Sports Complex, temporarily called the Asian Games Complex. The shooting event was held in Cibubur Shooting Range, in what is now lies within East Jakarta. The weightlifting and wrestling events were held at Ikada Sports Hall, now demolished to make way for the National Monument. The nearby Ikada Stadium was also used for football event, as well as Tebet football pitch, located southeast of the complex. The archery demonstration event was held at Menteng Stadium.

== Sports ==
While Weightlifting was in the program, the IWF withdrew recognition of the Asian Games competition after the Indonesian federation barred Taiwan and Israel from taking part.

- Athletics (32)
- Badminton (6)
- Basketball (1)
- Boxing (10)
- Cycling (4)
- Diving (4)
- Field hockey (1)
- Football (1)
- Shooting (5)
- Swimming (21)
- Table tennis (7)
- Tennis (7)
- Volleyball (4)
- Water polo (1)
- Wrestling (16)

Exhibition sports

- Archery (3) ()

== Participating nations ==
Athletes from 15 nations competed at the Asian Games.

Participating National Olympic Committees
- Afghanistan (11)
- Burma (31)
- Cambodia (74)
- Ceylon (32)
- Hong Kong (54)
- India (74)
- Indonesia (285)
- Japan (210)
- Malaya (121)
- Pakistan (76)
- Philippines (173)
- Singapore (94)
- South Korea (137)
- South Vietnam (37)
- Thailand (127)

Number of athletes by National Olympic Committees (by highest to lowest)

IOC Letter Code	Country	Athletes
INA	Indonesia	285
JPN	Japan	210
PHI	Philippines	173
KOR	South Korea	137
THA	Thailand	127
MAL	Malaya	121
SGP	Singapore	94
PAK	Pakistan	76
CAM	Cambodia	74
IND	India	74
HKG	Hong Kong	54
VNM	South Vietnam	37
CEY	Ceylon	32
BIR	Burma	31
AFG	Afghanistan	11

== Medal table ==
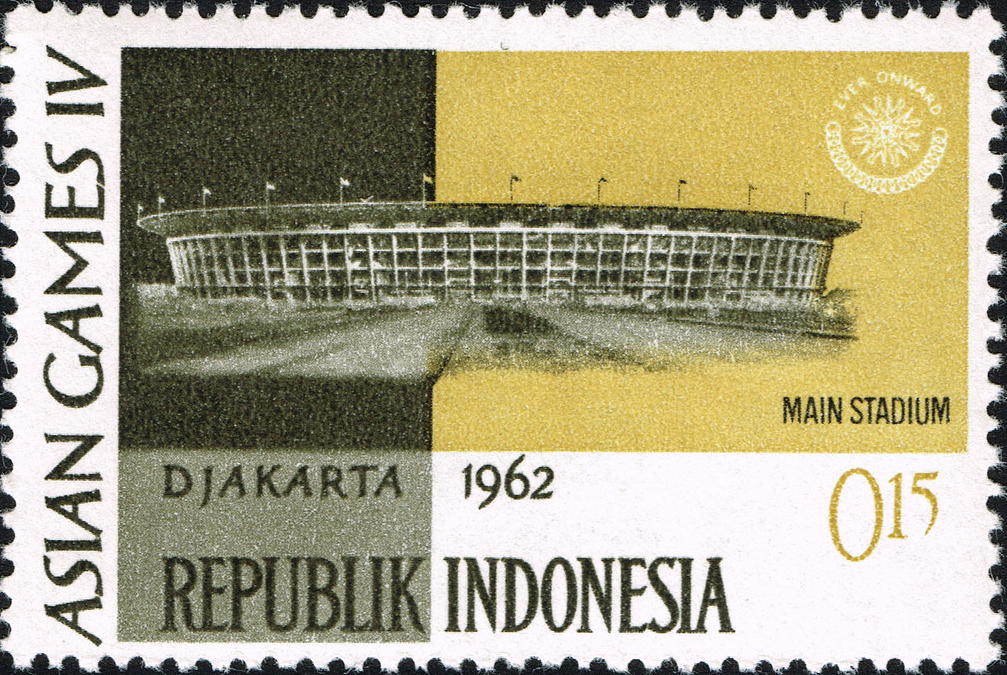
Gelora Bung Karno Stadium on a 1962 stamp of Indonesia

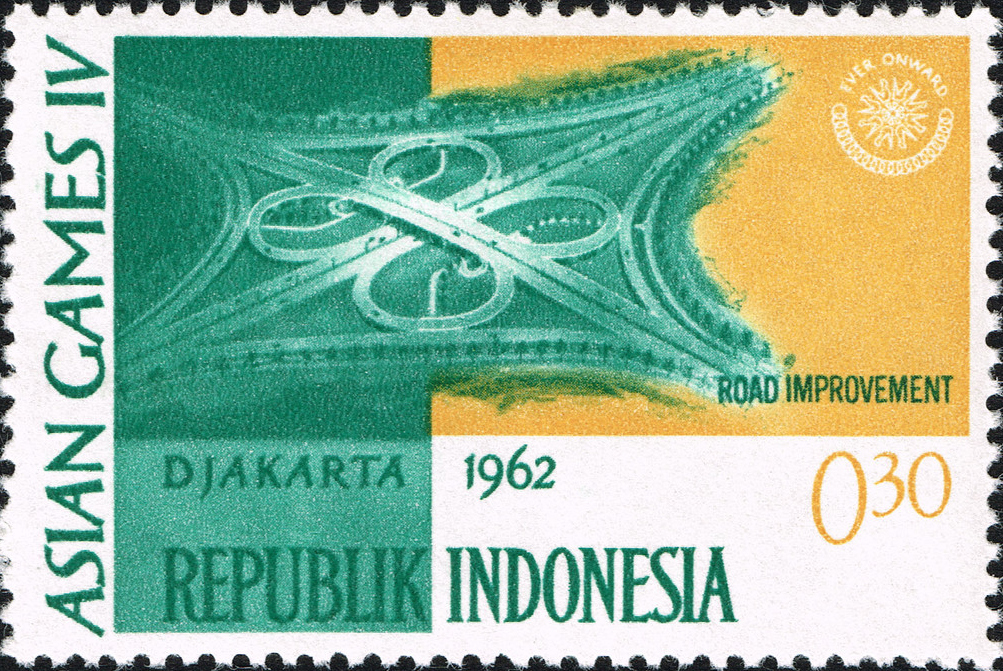
A stamp of Indonesia claiming road improvement for the 1962 Asian Games

The top ten ranked NOCs at these Games are listed below. The host nation, Indonesia, is highlighted.

* Host nation (Indonesia)

Rank	Nation	Gold	Silver	Bronze	Total
1	Japan (JPN)	73	56	23	152
2	Indonesia (INA)*	11	12	28	51
3	India (IND)	10	13	10	33
4	Pakistan (PAK)	8	11	9	28
5	Philippines (PHI)	7	6	24	37
6	South Korea (KOR)	4	9	10	23
7	Thailand (THA)	2	6	4	12
8	Malaya (MAL)	2	4	9	15
9	Burma (BIR)	2	1	5	8
10	Singapore (SIN)	1	0	2	3
11–15	Remaining	0	4	6	10
Totals (15 entries)		120	122	130	372

== Broadcasting ==
In Indonesia, a television station TVRI was established by the Indonesian government to broadcast the games for the general public, which was the first in the country. The station would become the main channel of TVRI network; and its first airdate, which coincides with the opening ceremony, become the network's founding date.

Preceded by Tokyo	Asian Games; Jakarta; IV Asiad (1962)	Succeeded by Bangkok
