= List of Asian Games medalists in shooting =

This is the complete list of Asian Games medalists in shooting from 1954 to 2022.

== Men ==
=== Pistol ===
==== 10 m air pistol ====
- From 1974 to 1982, open to both genders

| Games | Gold | Silver | Bronze |
|---|---|---|---|
| 1974 Tehran | Jin Chunba (CHN) | Baek Il-hyon (PRK) | Vichit Chiewvej (THA) |
| 1978 Bangkok | Fumihisa Semizuki (JPN) | Ratana Krajangphot (THA) | Zhang Hong (CHN) |
| 1982 New Delhi | So Gil-san (PRK) | Wang Yifu (CHN) | Prawat Kongcharoen (THA) |
| 1986 Seoul | Xu Haifeng (CHN) | Min Young-sam (KOR) | Mamoru Inagaki (JPN) |
| 1990 Beijing | Zhang Shengge (CHN) | Wang Yifu (CHN) | So Gil-san (PRK) |
| 1994 Hiroshima | Wang Yifu (CHN) | Zhang Shengge (CHN) | Masaru Nakashige (JPN) |
| 1998 Bangkok | Xu Dan (CHN) | Tan Zongliang (CHN) | Vladimir Guchsha (KAZ) |
| 2002 Busan | Tan Zongliang (CHN) | Kim Jong-su (PRK) | Jin Jong-oh (KOR) |
| 2006 Doha | Tan Zongliang (CHN) | Kim Jong-su (PRK) | Jin Jong-oh (KOR) |
| 2010 Guangzhou | Lee Dae-myung (KOR) | Tan Zongliang (CHN) | Vijay Kumar (IND) |
| 2014 Incheon | Kim Cheong-yong (KOR) | Pang Wei (CHN) | Jin Jong-oh (KOR) |
| 2018 Jakarta–Palembang | Saurabh Chaudhary (IND) | Tomoyuki Matsuda (JPN) | Abhishek Verma (IND) |
| 2022 Hangzhou | Phạm Quang Huy (VIE) | Lee Won-ho (KOR) | Vladimir Svechnikov (UZB) |

==== 10 m air pistol team ====
- From 1974 to 1982, open to both genders

| Games | Gold | Silver | Bronze |
|---|---|---|---|
| 1974 Tehran | Thailand (THA); Vichit Chiewvej; Sanasen Promma; Boriboon Vutiphagdee; Rangsit Yanothai | North Korea (PRK); Baek Il-hyon; Jun Sang-chol; Kim Gi-jong; Kim Yong-il | China (CHN); Bao Saina; Jin Chunba; Qi Kefa; Su Zhibo |
| 1978 Bangkok | Japan (JPN); Takayasu Eto; Makoto Ichimura; Masaaki Kamimura; Fumihisa Semizuki | Thailand (THA); Vichit Chiewvej; Ratana Krajangphot; Boriboon Vutiphagdee; Rangsit Yanothai | China (CHN); Jin Chunba; Wang Jia; Zhang Hong; Zheng Qingshan |
| 1982 New Delhi | North Korea (PRK); Chon Tae-song; Kim Chi-man; Kim Gi-jong; So Gil-san | China (CHN); Chou Zhijian; Liu Jingsheng; Su Zhibo; Wang Yifu | Japan (JPN); Takayasu Eto; Junichi Haneda; Mamoru Inagaki; Fumihisa Semizuki |
| 1986 Seoul | China (CHN); Wang Yifu; Xu Haifeng; Zuo Pei | South Korea (KOR); Lee Won-suk; Lim Tae-ho; Min Young-sam | Japan (JPN); Mamoru Inagaki; Fumihisa Semizuki; Shigetoshi Tashiro |
| 1990 Beijing | China (CHN); Wang Yifu; Xu Haifeng; Zhang Shengge | North Korea (PRK); Kim Gi-jong; Ryu Myong-yon; So Gil-san | Japan (JPN); Mamoru Inagaki; Toshiaki Ochi; Fumihisa Semizuki |
| 1994 Hiroshima | China (CHN); Li Jinbao; Wang Yifu; Zhang Shengge | Uzbekistan (UZB); Shukhrat Akhmedov; Enver Osmanov; Nikolay Repichev | Thailand (THA); Surin Klomjai; Weraphan Komkris; Jakkrit Panichpatikum |
| 1998 Bangkok | China (CHN); Tan Zongliang; Wang Yifu; Xu Dan | Japan (JPN); Tomohiro Kida; Masaru Nakashige; Noriyuki Nishitani | South Korea (KOR); Kim Seon-il; Kim Sung-joon; Kwon Jeong-wook |
| 2002 Busan | China (CHN); Tan Zongliang; Wang Yifu; Xu Dan | North Korea (PRK); Kim Hyon-ung; Kim Jong-su; Ryu Myong-yon | Kazakhstan (KAZ); Vladimir Guchsha; Vladimir Issachenko; Rashid Yunusmetov |
| 2006 Doha | China (CHN); Lin Zhongzai; Pang Wei; Tan Zongliang | South Korea (KOR); Jin Jong-oh; Kim Young-wook; Lee Dae-myung | Vietnam (VIE); Hoàng Xuân Vinh; Nguyễn Mạnh Tường; Trần Quốc Cường |
| 2010 Guangzhou | South Korea (KOR); Jin Jong-oh; Lee Dae-myung; Lee Sang-do | China (CHN); Pang Wei; Pu Qifeng; Tan Zongliang | Japan (JPN); Kojiro Horimizu; Susumu Kobayashi; Tomoyuki Matsuda |
| 2014 Incheon | South Korea (KOR); Jin Jong-oh; Kim Cheong-yong; Lee Dae-myung | China (CHN); Pang Wei; Pu Qifeng; Wang Zhiwei | India (IND); Samaresh Jung; Prakash Nanjappa; Jitu Rai |
| 2022 Hangzhou | India (IND); Arjun Singh Cheema; Shiva Narwal; Sarabjot Singh | China (CHN); Liu Jinyao; Xie Yu; Zhang Bowen | Vietnam (VIE); Lại Công Minh; Phạm Quang Huy; Phan Công Minh |

==== 25 m center fire pistol ====
- From 1966 to 1982, open to both genders

| Games | Gold | Silver | Bronze |
|---|---|---|---|
| 1966 Bangkok | Nobuhiro Moriya (JPN) | Edgar Bond (PHI) | Rangsit Yanothai (THA) |
| 1970 Bangkok | Kim Yong-bae (KOR) | Makoto Shiraishi (JPN) | Nguyễn Văn Xuân (VNM) |
| 1974 Tehran | Hiroyuki Akatsuka (JPN) | Yang Qiang (CHN) | Tüdeviin Myagmarjav (MGL) |
| 1978 Bangkok | Hiroyuki Akatsuka (JPN) | Su Xiaoan (CHN) | Park Jong-kil (KOR) |
| 1982 New Delhi | So Gil-san (PRK) | Vichit Chiewvej (THA) | Deng Zening (CHN) |
| 1986 Seoul | Ikuo Fukuoka (JPN) | Manop Panichpatikum (THA) | Zhang Xiaodong (CHN) |
| 1990 Beijing | Park Byung-taek (KOR) | Shi Yujie (CHN) | Opas Ruengpanyawut (THA) |
| 1994 Hiroshima | Jaspal Rana (IND) | Shukhrat Akhmedov (UZB) | Park Byung-taek (KOR) |
| 1998 Bangkok | Park Byung-taek (KOR) | Jaspal Rana (IND) | Vladimir Vokhmyanin (KAZ) |
| 2002 Busan | Kim Jong-su (PRK) | Lee Sang-hak (KOR) | Nguyễn Mạnh Tường (VIE) |
| 2006 Doha | Jaspal Rana (IND) | Liu Guohui (CHN) | Jakkrit Panichpatikum (THA) |
| 2010 Guangzhou | Park Byung-taek (KOR) | Liu Yadong (CHN) | Vijay Kumar (IND) |
| 2014 Incheon | Oleg Engachev (QAT) | Jin Yongde (CHN) | Gai Bin (SIN) |

==== 25 m center fire pistol team ====
- From 1966 to 1982, open to both genders

| Games | Gold | Silver | Bronze |
|---|---|---|---|
| 1966 Bangkok | South Korea (KOR); An Jae-song; Koh Min-joon; Park Nam-kyu; Park Oh-joon | Thailand (THA); Boontham Booncharoen; Taweesak Kasiwat; Viraj Visessiri; Rangsit Yanothai | Philippines (PHI); Edgar Bond; Moises Gines; Antonio Mendoza; Horacio Miranda |
| 1970 Bangkok | Japan (JPN); Kanji Kubo; Makoto Shiraishi; Shinji Takahashi; Yoshihisa Yoshikawa | Thailand (THA); Jit Powgangwanwong; Viraj Visessiri; Boriboon Vutiphagdee; Rangsit Yanothai | South Korea (KOR); Kim Dal-hyup; Kim Yong-bae; Koh Min-joon; Park Nam-kyu |
| 1974 Tehran | China (CHN); Bao Saina; Su Zhibo; Yang Qiang; Zhu Huayu | Thailand (THA); Vichit Chiewvej; Ratana Krajangphot; Viraj Visessiri; Boriboon Vutiphagdee | South Korea (KOR); Kim Dal-hyup; Kim Yong-bae; Koh Min-joon; Park Jong-kil |
| 1978 Bangkok | North Korea (PRK); Kim Chi-man; Kim Su-il; Nam Son-u; So Gil-san | South Korea (KOR); Cha Byeong-guk; Lim Tae-ho; Nam Ho-won; Park Jong-kil | China (CHN); Deng Zening; Liang Zhangyi; Su Xiaoan; Wang Xusheng |
| 1982 New Delhi | North Korea (PRK); Kim Chi-man; Kim Su-il; Nam Son-u; So Gil-san | China (CHN); Deng Zening; He Yueming; Li Zhongqi; Su Zhibo | Thailand (THA); Vichit Chiewvej; Chana Jotikasthira; Opas Ruengpanyawut; Somchai Tongsak |
| 1986 Seoul | Japan (JPN); Ikuo Fukuoka; Hideo Nonaka; Katsumasa Onishi | China (CHN); Leng Shubin; Li Zhongqi; Zhang Xiaodong | South Korea (KOR); Lim Tae-ho; Park Jong-kil; Yang Chung-yul |
| 1990 Beijing | China (CHN); Shi Yujie; Wang Runxi; Xu Haifeng | South Korea (KOR); Lee Sang-hak; Lim Jang-soo; Park Byung-taek | Thailand (THA); Wirat Karndee; Nopparat Kulton; Opas Ruengpanyawut |
| 1994 Hiroshima | Uzbekistan (UZB); Shukhrat Akhmedov; Enver Osmanov; Nikolay Repichev | South Korea (KOR); Lee Ki-choon; Lee Sang-hak; Park Byung-taek | India (IND); Surinder Marwah; Ashok Pandit; Jaspal Rana |
| 1998 Bangkok | North Korea (PRK); Kim Hyon-ung; Kim Jong-su; Ryu Myong-yon | South Korea (KOR); Kim Sung-jun; Lee Sang-hak; Park Byung-taek | India (IND); Ashok Pandit; Ved Prakash Pilaniya; Jaspal Rana |
| 2002 Busan | China (CHN); Chen Yongqiang; Jin Yongde; Liu Yadong | North Korea (PRK); Kim Hyon-ung; Kim Jong-su; Ryu Myong-yon | South Korea (KOR); Jang Dae-kyu; Lee Sang-hak; Park Byung-taek |
| 2006 Doha | India (IND); Samaresh Jung; Vijay Kumar; Jaspal Rana | South Korea (KOR); Hong Seong-hwan; Jang Dae-kyu; Park Byung-taek | China (CHN); Liu Guohui; Liu Zhongsheng; Zhang Penghui |
| 2010 Guangzhou | China (CHN); Jin Yongde; Li Chuanlin; Liu Yadong | South Korea (KOR); Hong Seong-hwan; Jang Dae-kyu; Park Byung-taek | North Korea (PRK); Kim Chol-rim; Kim Jong-su; Ryu Myong-yon |
| 2014 Incheon | China (CHN); Ding Feng; Jin Yongde; Li Chuanlin | India (IND); Vijay Kumar; Gurpreet Singh; Pemba Tamang | South Korea (KOR); Jang Dae-kyu; Kim Jin-il; Kim Young-min |

==== 25 m rapid fire pistol ====
- From 1954 to 1982, open to both genders
- In 1966, 30 m rapid fire pistol

| Games | Gold | Silver | Bronze |
|---|---|---|---|
| 1954 Manila | Martin Gison (PHI) | Tsurukichi Kawaoka (JPN) | Lukman Saketi (INA) |
| 1958 Tokyo | Choji Hosaka (JPN) | Martin Gison (PHI) | Kamol Tandbachoon (THA) |
| 1962 Jakarta | Fumio Ryosenan (JPN) | Prateep Polphantin (THA) | John Posuma (INA) |
| 1966 Bangkok | Takeo Kamachi (JPN) | Viraj Visessiri (THA) | Paterno Miranda (PHI) |
| 1970 Bangkok | Kanji Kubo (JPN) | Chairat Ratanasupakorn (THA) | Koh Min-joon (KOR) |
| 1974 Tehran | Yun Chang-ho (PRK) | Kanji Kubo (JPN) | Zhang Runlong (CHN) |
| 1978 Bangkok | Park Jong-kil (KOR) | So Gil-san (PRK) | Takeo Kamachi (JPN) |
| 1982 New Delhi | So Gil-san (PRK) | Park Jong-kil (KOR) | Nguyễn Quốc Cường (VIE) |
| 1986 Seoul | Li Zhongqi (CHN) | Park Jong-kil (KOR) | Lim Jang-soo (KOR) |
| 1990 Beijing | Wang Runxi (CHN) | Lim Jang-soo (KOR) | Meng Gang (CHN) |
| 1994 Hiroshima | Vladimir Vokhmyanin (KAZ) | Meng Gang (CHN) | Wang Runxi (CHN) |
| 1998 Bangkok | Zhang Penghui (CHN) | Vladimir Vokhmyanin (KAZ) | Park Byung-taek (KOR) |
| 2002 Busan | Liu Guohui (CHN) | Lee Sang-hak (KOR) | Chen Yongqiang (CHN) |
| 2006 Doha | Liu Zhongsheng (CHN) | Zhang Penghui (CHN) | Vijay Kumar (IND) |
| 2010 Guangzhou | Li Yuehong (CHN) | Hà Minh Thành (VIE) | Zhang Jian (CHN) |
| 2014 Incheon | Kim Jun-hong (KOR) | Zhang Jian (CHN) | Hu Haozhe (CHN) |
| 2018 Jakarta–Palembang | Yao Zhaonan (CHN) | Lin Junmin (CHN) | Kim Jun-hong (KOR) |
| 2022 Hangzhou | Li Yuehong (CHN) | Liu Yangpan (CHN) | Nikita Chiryukin (KAZ) |

==== 25 m rapid fire pistol team ====
- From 1966 to 1982, open to both genders
- In 1966, 30 m rapid fire pistol

| Games | Gold | Silver | Bronze |
|---|---|---|---|
| 1966 Bangkok | Thailand (THA); Boontham Booncharoen; Taweesak Kasiwat; Viraj Visessiri; Rangsit Yanothai | Philippines (PHI); Nestor de Castro; Horacio Miranda; Paterno Miranda; Raymundo Quitoriano | Burma (BIR); Aye Aye Kyu; Kan U Khin Maung Myint; Kyaw Shein |
| 1970 Bangkok | Japan (JPN); Takeo Kamachi; Kanji Kubo; Makoto Shiraishi; Tadamasa Yamamoto | Thailand (THA); Solos Nalampoon; Chairat Ratanasupakorn; Viraj Visessiri; Rangsit Yanothai | Burma (BIR); Kan U San Yu; Soe Hlaing; Tin Soe |
| 1974 Tehran | North Korea (PRK); Jun Sang-chol; Kim Heung-doo; Yun Chang-ho; Yun Eung-mook | China (CHN); Lu Zongjian; Wei Xinghang; Zhang Rongguo; Zhang Runlong | Japan (JPN); Hiroyuki Akatsuka; Takeo Kamachi; Kanji Kubo; Makoto Shiraishi |
| 1978 Bangkok | North Korea (PRK); Kim Su-il; Nam Son-u; So Gil-san; Yun Chang-ho | Japan (JPN); Hiroyuki Akatsuka; Satoshi Fujita; Takeo Kamachi; Makoto Shiraishi | China (CHN); Chang Fuguang; Li Zhongqi; Liu Mingjun; Lu Zongjian |
| 1982 New Delhi | China (CHN); Cheng Zhongping; Du Xuean; Li Zhongqi; Liu Mingjun | North Korea (PRK); Ho Song-guk; Kim Su-il; Nam Son-u; So Gil-san | South Korea (KOR); Kim Woo-sik; Kim Yong-chul; Park Jong-kil; Yang Chung-yul |
| 1986 Seoul | South Korea (KOR); Lim Jang-soo; Park Jong-kil; Yang Chung-yul | China (CHN); Li Zhongqi; Peng Jianbin; Zhang Xiaodong | Japan (JPN); Junichi Haneda; Chiyokatsu Kimura; Hideo Nonaka |
| 1990 Beijing | South Korea (KOR); Lee Jong-il; Lim Jang-soo; Park Byung-taek | China (CHN); Liu Jun; Meng Gang; Wang Runxi | Japan (JPN); Hideo Nonaka; Katsumasa Onishi; Shoichi Uenosono |
| 1994 Hiroshima | China (CHN); Meng Gang; Wang Runxi; Zhang Ruimin | Kazakhstan (KAZ); Valeriy Kovalev; Igor Shmotkin; Vladimir Vokhmyanin | South Korea (KOR); Lee Sang-hak; Lim Jang-soo; Park Byung-taek |
| 1998 Bangkok | China (CHN); Ji Haiping; Meng Gang; Zhang Penghui | North Korea (PRK); Kim Hyon-ung; Kim Myong-sop; Ryu Myong-yon | Kazakhstan (KAZ); Alexandr Dudin; Igor Shmotkin; Vladimir Vokhmyanin |
| 2002 Busan | China (CHN); Chen Yongqiang; Ji Haiping; Liu Guohui | South Korea (KOR); Kang Hyung-chul; Lee Sang-hak; Lee Young-hoon | North Korea (PRK); Kang Chang-sik; Kim Hyon-ung; Kim Myong-sop |
| 2006 Doha | China (CHN); Liu Guohui; Liu Zhongsheng; Zhang Penghui | Japan (JPN); Teruyoshi Akiyama; Shigefumi Harada; Tomohiro Kida | Kazakhstan (KAZ); Igor Shmotkin; Sergey Vokhmyanin; Vladimir Vokhmyanin |
| 2010 Guangzhou | China (CHN); Ding Feng; Li Yuehong; Zhang Jian | South Korea (KOR); Cha Sang-jun; Hong Seong-hwan; Hwang Yoon-sam | Vietnam (VIE); Bùi Quang Nam; Hà Minh Thành; Phạm Anh Đạt |
| 2014 Incheon | South Korea (KOR); Jang Dae-kyu; Kim Jun-hong; Song Jong-ho | China (CHN); Hu Haozhe; Li Yuehong; Zhang Jian | Vietnam (VIE); Bùi Quang Nam; Hà Minh Thành; Kiều Thanh Tú |
| 2022 Hangzhou | China (CHN); Li Yuehong; Liu Yangpan; Wang Xinjie | South Korea (KOR); Kim Seo-jun; Lee Gun-hyeok; Song Jong-ho | India (IND); Anish Bhanwala; Vijayveer Sidhu; Adarsh Singh |

==== 25 m standard pistol ====
- From 1974 to 1982, open to both genders

| Games | Gold | Silver | Bronze |
|---|---|---|---|
| 1974 Tehran | Baek Il-hang (PRK) | Hiroyuki Akatsuka (JPN) | Song Woong-ik (KOR) |
| 1978 Bangkok | Deng Zening (CHN) | Park Jong-kil (KOR) | Hiroyuki Akatsuka (JPN) |
| 1982 New Delhi | Park Jong-kil (KOR) | Sharad Chauhan (IND) | Deng Zening (CHN) |
| 1986 Seoul | Manop Panichpatikum (THA) | Mamoru Inagaki (JPN) | Leng Shubin (CHN) |
| 1990 Beijing | Wang Hui (CHN) | Peera Piromratna (THA) | Kim Bong-chol (PRK) |
| 1994 Hiroshima | Wang Yifu (CHN) | Park Byung-taek (KOR) | Meng Gang (CHN) |
| 1998 Bangkok | Jin Yongde (CHN) | Dilshod Mukhtarov (UZB) | Wirat Karndee (THA) |
| 2002 Busan | Opas Ruengpanyawut (THA) | Liu Guohui (CHN) | Park Byung-taek (KOR) |
| 2006 Doha | Jaspal Rana (IND) | Park Byung-taek (KOR) | Vladimir Issachenko (KAZ) |
| 2010 Guangzhou | Hong Seong-hwan (KOR) | Kim Jong-su (PRK) | Jin Yongde (CHN) |
| 2014 Incheon | Ding Feng (CHN) | Kim Jun-hong (KOR) | Hà Minh Thành (VIE) |

==== 25 m standard pistol team ====
- From 1974 to 1982, open to both genders

| Games | Gold | Silver | Bronze |
|---|---|---|---|
| 1974 Tehran | Japan (JPN); Hiroyuki Akatsuka; Takeo Kamachi; Kazunori Kiyosue; Kanji Kubo | North Korea (PRK); Baek Il-hang; Jun Sang-chol; Kim Su-il; Yun Chang-ho | South Korea (KOR); Kim Dal-hyup; Kim Yong-bae; Park Jong-kil; Song Woong-ik |
| 1978 Bangkok | China (CHN); Deng Zening; Liang Zhangyi; Su Xiaoan; Wang Xusheng | Japan (JPN); Hiroyuki Akatsuka; Satoshi Fujita; Takeo Kamachi; Makoto Shiraishi | Thailand (THA); Vit Chaikittikorn; Boriboon Vutiphagdee; Sirin Wangspa; Rangsit Yanothai |
| 1982 New Delhi | Japan (JPN); Hiroyuki Akatsuka; Satoshi Fujita; Chiyokatsu Kimura; Hideo Nonaka | China (CHN); Deng Zening; Du Xuean; Leng Shubin; Li Zhongqi | South Korea (KOR); Jang Dai-un; Kim Woo-sik; Park Jong-kil; Yang Chung-yul |
| 1986 Seoul | Thailand (THA); Manop Panichpatikum; Peera Piromratna; Opas Ruengpanyawut | China (CHN); Leng Shubin; Li Zhongqi; Zhang Xiaodong | South Korea (KOR); Lim Tae-ho; Park Jong-kil; Yang Chung-yul |
| 1990 Beijing | China (CHN); Wang Hui; Wang Runxi; Wang Yifu | South Korea (KOR); Lee Sang-hak; Lim Jang-soo; Park Byung-taek | Thailand (THA); Wirat Karndee; Peera Piromratna; Opas Ruengpanyawut |
| 1994 Hiroshima | China (CHN); Meng Gang; Wang Runxi; Wang Yifu | Kazakhstan (KAZ); Valeriy Kovalev; Igor Shmotkin; Vladimir Vokhmyanin | Uzbekistan (UZB); Shukhrat Akhmedov; Enver Osmanov; Nikolay Repichev |
| 1998 Bangkok | North Korea (PRK); Kim Hyon-ung; Kim Jong-su; Kim Myong-sop | Kazakhstan (KAZ); Vladimir Guchsha; Igor Shmotkin; Vladimir Vokhmyanin | China (CHN); Jin Yongde; Lu Gang; Wang Yifu |
| 2002 Busan | China (CHN); Jin Yongde; Liu Guohui; Liu Yadong | South Korea (KOR); Kim Sung-jun; Lee Sang-hak; Park Byung-taek | North Korea (PRK); Kim Hyon-ung; Kim Jong-su; Ryu Myong-yon |
| 2006 Doha | South Korea (KOR); Hwang Yoon-sam; Jang Dae-kyu; Park Byung-taek | India (IND); Samaresh Jung; Ronak Pandit; Jaspal Rana | Thailand (THA); Pongpol Kulchairattana; Jakkrit Panichpatikum; Opas Ruengpanyawut |
| 2010 Guangzhou | South Korea (KOR); Hong Seong-hwan; Hwang Yoon-sam; Jang Dae-kyu | China (CHN); Jin Yongde; Li Chuanlin; Liu Yadong | North Korea (PRK); Kim Chol-rim; Kim Jong-su; Ryu Myong-yon |
| 2014 Incheon | China (CHN); Ding Feng; Jin Yongde; Li Chuanlin | South Korea (KOR); Jang Dae-kyu; Kang Min-su; Kim Jun-hong | Singapore (SIN); Gai Bin; Lim Swee Hon; Poh Lip Meng |

==== 50 m pistol ====
- From 1954 to 1982, open to both genders

| Games | Gold | Silver | Bronze |
|---|---|---|---|
| 1954 Manila | Choji Hosaka (JPN) | Albert von Einsiedel (PHI) | Simeon Lee (PHI) |
| 1958 Tokyo | Kazuo Takagi (JPN) | Amorn Yuktanandana (THA) | Wang Chih-shan (ROC) |
| 1962 Jakarta | Yoshihisa Yoshikawa (JPN) | Lely Sampurno (INA) | Suh Kang-wook (KOR) |
| 1966 Bangkok | Yoshihisa Yoshikawa (JPN) | Suh Kang-wook (KOR) | Hoo Kam Chiu (HKG) |
| 1970 Bangkok | Isamu Hakari (JPN) | Sutham Aswanit (THA) | Hồ Minh Thu (VNM) |
| 1974 Tehran | Su Zhibo (CHN) | Masanobu Ohata (JPN) | Sutham Aswanit (THA) |
| 1978 Bangkok | Su Zhibo (CHN) | Kim Gi-jong (PRK) | Masaaki Kamimura (JPN) |
| 1982 New Delhi | So Gil-san (PRK) | Shigetoshi Tashiro (JPN) | Wang Yifu (CHN) |
| 1986 Seoul | Xu Haifeng (CHN) | Wang Yifu (CHN) | Gilbert U (HKG) |
| 1990 Beijing | Xu Haifeng (CHN) | Li Jinbao (CHN) | Wang Yifu (CHN) |
| 1994 Hiroshima | Masaru Nakashige (JPN) | Wang Yifu (CHN) | Xu Dan (CHN) |
| 1998 Bangkok | Vladimir Guchsha (KAZ) | Wang Yifu (CHN) | Kim Jong-su (PRK) |
| 2002 Busan | Wang Yifu (CHN) | Tan Zongliang (CHN) | Kim Jong-su (PRK) |
| 2006 Doha | Xu Kun (CHN) | Rashid Yunusmetov (KAZ) | Kim Jong-su (PRK) |
| 2010 Guangzhou | Pu Qifeng (CHN) | Jin Jong-oh (KOR) | Tomoyuki Matsuda (JPN) |
| 2014 Incheon | Jitu Rai (IND) | Nguyễn Hoàng Phương (VIE) | Wang Zhiwei (CHN) |

==== 50 m pistol team ====
- From 1966 to 1982, open to both genders

| Games | Gold | Silver | Bronze |
|---|---|---|---|
| 1966 Bangkok | South Korea (KOR); An Jae-song; Kim Yong-bae; Koh Min-joon; Suh Kang-wook | Thailand (THA); Paitoon Smuthranond; Viraj Visessiri; Rangsit Yanothai; Amorn Yuktanan | Burma (BIR); Aye Aye Kyu; Kan U Khin Maung Myint; Mya Zin |
| 1970 Bangkok | Japan (JPN); Isamu Hakari; Takeo Kamachi; Shinji Takahashi; Yoshihisa Yoshikawa | Thailand (THA); Sutham Aswanit; Samak Chainares; Mongkol Promsit; Boriboon Vutiphagdee | South Korea (KOR); Kim Dal-hyup; Kim Yong-bae; Song Woong-ik; Suh Kang-wook |
| 1974 Tehran | China (CHN); Jin Chunba; Qi Kefa; Su Zhibao; Yang Qiang | Japan (JPN); Masanobu Ohata; Isamu Suzuki; Shinji Takahashi; Shigetoshi Tashiro | Thailand (THA); Sutham Aswanit; Samak Chainares; Ratana Krajangphot; Veera Uppapong |
| 1978 Bangkok | China (CHN); Jin Chunba; Su Zhibo; Zhang Hong; Zheng Qingshan | Thailand (THA); Samak Chainares; Vichit Chiewvej; Mongkol Promsit; Veera Uppapong | Japan (JPN); Takayasu Eto; Chikafumi Hirai; Makoto Ichimura; Masaaki Kamimura |
| 1982 New Delhi | North Korea (PRK); Chon Tae-song; Kim Chi-man; Kim Gi-jong; So Gil-san | China (CHN); Chou Zhijian; Liu Jingsheng; Su Zhibo; Wang Yifu | Japan (JPN); Takayasu Eto; Chikafumi Hirai; Mamoru Inagaki; Shigetoshi Tashiro |
| 1986 Seoul | China (CHN); Liu Jingsheng; Wang Yifu; Xu Haifeng | Japan (JPN); Chikafumi Hirai; Mamoru Inagaki; Shigetoshi Tashiro | South Korea (KOR); Lee Won-suk; Min Young-sam; Seo In-taek |
| 1990 Beijing | China (CHN); Li Jinbao; Wang Yifu; Xu Haifeng | Japan (JPN); Mamoru Inagaki; Toshiaki Ochi; Fumihisa Semizuki | North Korea (PRK); Kim Gi-jong; Ryu Myong-yon; So Gil-san |
| 1994 Hiroshima | China (CHN); Wang Yifu; Xu Dan; Xu Haifeng | Japan (JPN); Kiyoshi Fujii; Mamoru Inagaki; Masaru Nakashige | Uzbekistan (UZB); Shukhrat Akhmedov; Enver Osmanov; Nikolay Repichev |
| 1998 Bangkok | North Korea (PRK); Kim Hyon-ung; Kim Jong-su; Ryu Myong-yon | China (CHN); Tan Zongliang; Wang Yifu; Wu Hui | Japan (JPN); Takuya Mino; Masaru Nakashige; Noriyuki Nishitani |
| 2002 Busan | China (CHN); Tan Zongliang; Wang Yifu; Xu Dan | South Korea (KOR); Jin Jong-oh; Kim Seon-il; Lee Sang-do | North Korea (PRK); Kim Hyon-ung; Kim Jong-su; Ryu Myong-yon |
| 2006 Doha | China (CHN); Pang Wei; Tan Zongliang; Xu Kun | North Korea (PRK); Kim Hyon-ung; Kim Jong-su; Ryu Myong-yon | South Korea (KOR); Jin Jong-oh; Kim Young-wook; Lee Sang-do |
| 2010 Guangzhou | South Korea (KOR); Jin Jong-oh; Lee Dae-myung; Lee Sang-do | China (CHN); Pang Wei; Pu Qifeng; Wu Jing | Japan (JPN); Kojiro Horimizu; Susumu Kobayashi; Tomoyuki Matsuda |
| 2014 Incheon | China (CHN); Pang Wei; Pu Qifeng; Wang Zhiwei | South Korea (KOR); Choi Young-rae; Jin Jong-oh; Lee Dae-myung | Vietnam (VIE); Hoàng Xuân Vinh; Nguyễn Hoàng Phương; Trần Quốc Cường |

=== Rifle ===
==== 10 m air rifle ====
- From 1966 to 1982, open to both genders

| Games | Gold | Silver | Bronze |
|---|---|---|---|
| 1966 Bangkok | Wu Tao-yuan (ROC) | Nam Sang-wan (KOR) | Elias Joseph Lessy (INA) |
| 1970 Bangkok | Minoru Ito (JPN) | Henry Hershkowitz (ISR) | Thamnoon Suebsamarn (THA) |
| 1974 Tehran | Ri Ho-jun (PRK) | Kwon Jeong-keon (KOR) | Paisarn Chamornmarn (THA) |
| 1978 Bangkok | Pang Liqin (CHN) | Paisarn Chamornmarn (THA) | Kim Gyong-ho (PRK) |
| 1982 New Delhi | Wu Xiaoxuan (CHN) | Kim Dong-gil (PRK) | Hiroyuki Nakajo (JPN) |
| 1986 Seoul | Qiu Bo (CHN) | Lee Eun-chul (KOR) | Xu Xiaoguang (CHN) |
| 1990 Beijing | An Byung-kyun (KOR) | Masaru Yanagida (JPN) | Ryohei Koba (JPN) |
| 1994 Hiroshima | Ning Lijia (CHN) | Chae Keun-bae (KOR) | Masaru Yanagida (JPN) |
| 1998 Bangkok | Cai Yalin (CHN) | Masaru Yanagida (JPN) | Komkrit Kongnamchok (THA) |
| 2002 Busan | Li Jie (CHN) | Zhang Fu (CHN) | Naoki Isobe (JPN) |
| 2006 Doha | Liu Tianyou (CHN) | Zhu Qinan (CHN) | Yu Jae-chul (KOR) |
| 2010 Guangzhou | Zhu Qinan (CHN) | Gagan Narang (IND) | Kim Ki-won (KOR) |
| 2014 Incheon | Yang Haoran (CHN) | Cao Yifei (CHN) | Abhinav Bindra (IND) |
| 2018 Jakarta–Palembang | Yang Haoran (CHN) | Deepak Kumar (IND) | Lu Shao-chuan (TPE) |
| 2022 Hangzhou | Sheng Lihao (CHN) | Park Ha-jun (KOR) | Aishwary Pratap Singh Tomar (IND) |

==== 10 m air rifle team ====
- From 1966 to 1982, open to both genders

| Games | Gold | Silver | Bronze |
|---|---|---|---|
| 1966 Bangkok | Japan (JPN); Takao Ishii; Junji Kido; Shigemi Saito; Kunio Tamai | South Korea (KOR); Bae Byung-ki; Huh Wook-bong; Nam Sang-wan; Oh Gul | Philippines (PHI); Leopoldo Ang; Roberto del Castillo; Lodovico Espinosa; Adolfo Feliciano |
| 1970 Bangkok | Japan (JPN); Minoru Ito; Hiroya Okuda; Kazuya Ono; Kenjiro Tsuba | Thailand (THA); Chawalit Kamutchati; Pipat Rukschareon; Thamnoon Suebsamarn; Surin Sukagasikorn | Burma (BIR); Kyaw Shein; Kyaw Lin; Maung Tun; Tun Shein |
| 1974 Tehran | North Korea (PRK); Han Dong-kyu; Kim Gyong-ho; Ri Ho-jun; Ri Yun-hae | South Korea (KOR); Kim Il-hwan; Kwon Jeong-keon; Lee Bum-hyuk; Nam Sang-wan | Japan (JPN); Takeo Imamura; Kimio Irie; Minoru Ito; Nobuhisa Tachibana |
| 1978 Bangkok | China (CHN); Mou Luhui; Pang Liqin; Qi Feng; Zhou Guining | North Korea (PRK); Kim Dong-gil; Kim Gyong-ho; Ri Ho-jun; Sin Jae-myung | South Korea (KOR); Myung Jae-hwan; Park Nam-soon; Seo Jang-woon; Yoon Deok-ha |
| 1982 New Delhi | China (CHN); Pang Liqin; Wang Shaobo; Wu Xiaoxuan; Zhang Kezhong | Japan (JPN); Akio Ito; Ryohei Koba; Kaoru Matsuo; Hiroyuki Nakajo | North Korea (PRK); Hong Gwang-sik; Kim Dong-gil; Kim Gyong-ho; Kim Yun-sob |
| 1986 Seoul | China (CHN); Qiu Bo; Xu Xiaoguang; Zhang Yingzhou | South Korea (KOR); Kim Jong-gil; Lee Eun-chul; Park Hee-dae | Japan (JPN); Ryohei Koba; Kaoru Matsuo; Hiroyuki Nakajo |
| 1990 Beijing | Japan (JPN); Ryohei Koba; Akihiro Mera; Masaru Yanagida | South Korea (KOR); An Byung-kyun; Bae Sung-duk; Kim Jong-gil | North Korea (PRK); Hong Gwang-sik; Kim Dong-gil; Kim Yun-sob |
| 1994 Hiroshima | South Korea (KOR); Chae Keun-bae; Kim Se-ho; Kim Sung-soo | Japan (JPN); Seijiro Kinouchi; Ryohei Koba; Masaru Yanagida | China (CHN); Cao Xiaojun; Du Long; Ning Lijia |
| 1998 Bangkok | Thailand (THA); Samarn Jongsuk; Komkrit Kongnamchok; Tevarit Majchacheep | China (CHN); Cai Yalin; Shan Zhendong; Yao Ye | Japan (JPN); Ryohei Koba; Naoki Kurita; Masaru Yanagida |
| 2002 Busan | China (CHN); Cai Yalin; Li Jie; Zhang Fu | Japan (JPN); Naoki Isobe; Takayuki Okada; Masaru Yanagida | South Korea (KOR); Kim Byung-eun; Lee Woo-jeong; Lim Young-sueb |
| 2006 Doha | China (CHN); Li Jie; Liu Tianyou; Zhu Qinan | South Korea (KOR); Chae Keun-bae; Kim Hye-sung; Yu Jae-chul | India (IND); Navanath Faratade; Gagan Narang; P. T. Raghunath |
| 2010 Guangzhou | China (CHN); Cao Yifei; Yu Jikang; Zhu Qinan | India (IND); Abhinav Bindra; Gagan Narang; Sanjeev Rajput | South Korea (KOR); Choi Sung-soon; Kim Jong-hyun; Kim Ki-won |
| 2014 Incheon | China (CHN); Cao Yifei; Liu Tianyou; Yang Haoran | South Korea (KOR); Han Jin-seop; Kim Hyeon-jun; Kim Sang-do | India (IND); Abhinav Bindra; Ravi Kumar; Sanjeev Rajput |
| 2022 Hangzhou | India (IND); Divyansh Singh Panwar; Rudrankksh Patil; Aishwary Pratap Singh Tomar | South Korea (KOR); Kim Sang-do; Nam Tae-yun; Park Ha-jun | China (CHN); Du Linshu; Sheng Lihao; Yu Haonan |

==== 50 m rifle prone ====
- From 1954 to 1982, open to both genders

| Games | Gold | Silver | Bronze |
|---|---|---|---|
| 1954 Manila | Albert von Einsiedel (PHI) | Cesar Jayme (PHI) | Martin Gison (PHI) |
| 1958 Tokyo | Yukio Inokuma (JPN) | Cesar Jayme (PHI) | Henry Souza (HKG) |
| 1962 Jakarta | Fred de Souza (SIN) | Zenichi Akagawa (JPN) | Henry Shaw (IND) |
| 1966 Bangkok | Choo Hwa-il (KOR) | Nehemia Sirkis (ISR) | Adolfo Feliciano (PHI) |
| 1970 Bangkok | Takeo Toriyama (JPN) | Choo Hwa-il (KOR) | Nehemia Sirkis (ISR) |
| 1974 Tehran | Sachio Hosokawa (JPN) | Ri Yun-hae (PRK) | Li Bingyou (CHN) |
| 1978 Bangkok | Kim Gyong-ho (PRK) | Lin Bo (CHN) | Kwon Jeong-keon (KOR) |
| 1982 New Delhi | Yuji Ogawa (JPN) | Gombosürengiin Ganzorig (MGL) | Jose Medina (PHI) |
| 1986 Seoul | Cha Young-chul (KOR) | Xu Xiaoguang (CHN) | Zhang Yingzhou (CHN) |
| 1990 Beijing | Ryohei Koba (JPN) | Xu Xiaoguang (CHN) | Cha Young-chul (KOR) |
| 1994 Hiroshima | Sergey Belyayev (KAZ) | Li Wenjie (CHN) | Ning Lijia (CHN) |
| 1998 Bangkok | Igor Pirekeýew (TKM) | Tevarit Majchacheep (THA) | Naoki Kurita (JPN) |
| 2002 Busan | Sergey Belyayev (KAZ) | Igor Pirekeýew (TKM) | Yao Ye (CHN) |
| 2006 Doha | Liu Gang (CHN) | Igor Pirekeýew (TKM) | Sergey Belyayev (KAZ) |
| 2010 Guangzhou | Kim Hak-man (KOR) | Yuriy Melsitov (KAZ) | Tian Hui (CHN) |
| 2014 Incheon | Zhao Shengbo (CHN) | Ezuan Nasir Khan (MAS) | Park Bong-duk (KOR) |

==== 50 m rifle prone team ====
- From 1966 to 1982, open to both genders

| Games | Gold | Silver | Bronze |
|---|---|---|---|
| 1966 Bangkok | Japan (JPN); Takao Ishii; Junji Kido; Shigemi Saito; Kunio Tamai | South Korea (KOR); Bae Byung-ki; Choo Hwa-il; Nam Sang-wan; Oh Gul | Republic of China (ROC); Lee Chang-yen; Pan Kou-ang; Tai Chao-chih; Wu Tao-yuan |
| 1970 Bangkok | Israel (ISR); Henry Hershkowitz; Micha Kaufman; Zelig Shtorch; Nehemia Sirkis | South Korea (KOR); Bae Byung-ki; Choo Hwa-il; Nam Sang-wan; Oh Gul | Japan (JPN); Minoru Ito; Hiroya Okuda; Kazuya Ono; Takeo Toriyama |
| 1974 Tehran | North Korea (PRK); Choi Chang-yoon; Han Dong-kyu; Kim Gyong-ho; Ri Yun-hae | South Korea (KOR); Choi Chung-seok; Choo Hwa-il; Huh Wook-bong; Lee Kyun | Japan (JPN); Kumeo Fukasawa; Sachio Hosokawa; Kaoru Matsuo; Michiharu Ozaki |
| 1978 Bangkok | North Korea (PRK); Chei Yung-sam; Kim Gyong-ho; Kim Yun-sob; Pae Kyung-son | South Korea (KOR); Kwon Jeong-keon; Seo Jang-woon; Seo Man-ho; Yoon Deok-ha | China (CHN); Cheng Wensong; Jin Dongxiang; Lin Bo; Mou Luhui |
| 1982 New Delhi | Mongolia (MGL); Sangidorjiin Adilbish; Sain-Eriin Enkhjargal; Gombosürengiin Ganzorig; Mendbayaryn Jantsankhorloo | Japan (JPN); Norito Chosa; Kunio Hayashi; Kaoru Matsuo; Yuji Ogawa | South Korea (KOR); Kwak Jung-hoon; Park Young-sin; Seo Jang-woon; Yoon Deok-ha |
| 1986 Seoul | South Korea (KOR); Cha Young-chul; Kwak Jung-hoon; Yoon Deok-ha | China (CHN); Jiang Rong; Xu Xiaoguang; Zhang Yingzhou | Japan (JPN); Ryohei Koba; Yuji Ogawa; Kimihiko Oura |
| 1990 Beijing | China (CHN); Jiang Rong; Xu Xiaoguang; Zhang Yingzhou | South Korea (KOR); Cha Young-chul; Lee Eun-chul; Lee See-hong | Japan (JPN); Ryohei Koba; Akihiro Mera; Yuji Ogawa |
| 1994 Hiroshima | China (CHN); Jiang Rong; Li Wenjie; Ning Lijia | Japan (JPN); Seijiro Kinouchi; Ryohei Koba; Akihiro Mera | Kazakhstan (KAZ); Sergey Belyayev; Alexandr Melsitov; Yuriy Melsitov |
| 1998 Bangkok | Thailand (THA); Samarn Jongsuk; Tevarit Majchacheep; Nopparat Yavilaspradit | Kyrgyzstan (KGZ); Aleksandr Babchenko; Tachir Ismailov; Yuri Lomov | China (CHN); Li Wenjie; Ning Lijia; Yu Bo |
| 2002 Busan | South Korea (KOR); Choi Byung-woo; Kang Seung-kyun; Nam Hyung-jin | China (CHN); Qiu Jian; Wang Weiyi; Yao Ye | Kazakhstan (KAZ); Sergey Belyayev; Vitaliy Dovgun; Yuriy Melsitov |
| 2006 Doha | Kazakhstan (KAZ); Sergey Belyayev; Vitaliy Dovgun; Yuriy Melsitov | South Korea (KOR); Jeon Dong-ju; Lee Hyun-tae; Park Bong-duk | China (CHN); Liu Gang; Zhang Fu; Zhang Lei |
| 2010 Guangzhou | South Korea (KOR); Han Jin-seop; Kim Hak-man; Kim Jong-hyun | China (CHN); Tian Hui; Tian Pu; Wang Weiyi | Kazakhstan (KAZ); Yuriy Melsitov; Igor Pirekeyev; Alexandr Yermakov |
| 2014 Incheon | China (CHN); Lan Xing; Liu Gang; Zhao Shengbo | South Korea (KOR); Kwon Jun-cheol; Park Bong-duk; You Jae-jin | Kazakhstan (KAZ); Ratmir Mindiyarov; Igor Pirekeyev; Yuriy Yurkov |

==== 50 m rifle kneeling ====
| Games | Gold | Silver | Bronze |
|---|---|---|---|
| 1994 Hiroshima | Sergey Belyayev (KAZ) | Yuri Lomov (KGZ) | Choi Byung-woo (KOR) |

==== 50 m rifle standing ====
| Games | Gold | Silver | Bronze |
|---|---|---|---|
| 1994 Hiroshima | Ryohei Koba (JPN) | Lee Eun-chul (KOR) | Cha Young-chul (KOR) |

==== 50 m rifle 3 positions ====
- From 1954 to 1982, open to both genders

| Games | Gold | Silver | Bronze |
|---|---|---|---|
| 1954 Manila | Adolfo Feliciano (PHI) | Martin Gison (PHI) | Jose Zalvidea (PHI) |
| 1958 Tokyo | Kiyoshi Shimoda (JPN) | Wu Tao-yuan (ROC) | Adolfo Feliciano (PHI) |
| 1962 Jakarta | Takao Ishii (JPN) | Adolfo Feliciano (PHI) | Bae Byung-ki (KOR) |
| 1966 Bangkok | Wu Tao-yuan (ROC) | Takao Ishii (JPN) | Adolfo Feliciano (PHI) |
| 1970 Bangkok | Shin Hyun-joo (KOR) | Wu Tao-yuan (ROC) | Preeda Phengdisth (THA) |
| 1974 Tehran | Han Dong-kyu (PRK) | Ge Weilie (CHN) | Huh Wook-bong (KOR) |
| 1978 Bangkok | Ri Ho-jun (PRK) | Mou Luhui (CHN) | Yoon Deok-ha (KOR) |
| 1982 New Delhi | Yoon Deok-ha (KOR) | Zhang Kezhong (CHN) | Kim Yun-sob (PRK) |
| 1986 Seoul | Ryohei Koba (JPN) | Nam Hong-woo (KOR) | Zhang Yingzhou (CHN) |
| 1990 Beijing | Lee Eun-chul (KOR) | Ryohei Koba (JPN) | Zhang Yingzhou (CHN) |
| 1994 Hiroshima | Lee Eun-chul (KOR) | Sergey Belyayev (KAZ) | Cha Young-chul (KOR) |
| 1998 Bangkok | Ning Lijia (CHN) | Yuri Lomov (KGZ) | Park Bong-duk (KOR) |
| 2002 Busan | Igor Pirekeýew (TKM) | Yao Ye (CHN) | Park Bong-duk (KOR) |
| 2006 Doha | Zhang Fu (CHN) | Zhang Lei (CHN) | Gagan Narang (IND) |
| 2010 Guangzhou | Han Jin-seop (KOR) | Kim Jong-hyun (KOR) | Zhu Qinan (CHN) |
| 2014 Incheon | Cao Yifei (CHN) | Zhu Qinan (CHN) | Chain Singh (IND) |
| 2018 Jakarta–Palembang | Hui Zicheng (CHN) | Sanjeev Rajput (IND) | Takayuki Matsumoto (JPN) |
| 2022 Hangzhou | Du Linshu (CHN) | Aishwary Pratap Singh Tomar (IND) | Tian Jiaming (CHN) |

==== 50 m rifle 3 positions team ====
- From 1966 to 1982, open to both genders

| Games | Gold | Silver | Bronze |
|---|---|---|---|
| 1966 Bangkok | Japan (JPN); Takao Ishii; Junji Kido; Shigemi Saito; Kunio Tamai | Philippines (PHI); Leopoldo Ang; Roberto del Castillo; Adolfo Feliciano; Bernardo San Juan | South Korea (KOR); Bae Byung-ki; Huh Wook-bong; Nam Sang-wan; Song Joo-chae |
| 1970 Bangkok | South Korea (KOR); Bae Byung-ki; Huh Wook-bong; Nam Sang-wan; Shin Hyun-joo | Israel (ISR); Shimon Friedman; Henry Hershkowitz; Micha Kaufman; Zelig Shtorch | Japan (JPN); Minoru Ito; Hiroya Okuda; Kazuya Ono; Kenjiro Tsuba |
| 1974 Tehran | North Korea (PRK); Han Dong-kyu; Kim Gyong-ho; Ri Ho-jun; Son Sung-hoon | China (CHN); Cui Shunyou; Ge Weilie; Leng Guiying; Liu Weisheng | Japan (JPN); Minoru Ito; Kaoru Matsuo; Michiharu Ozaki; Nobuhisa Tachibana |
| 1978 Bangkok | China (CHN); Jin Dongxiang; Leng Guiying; Lin Bo; Mou Luhui | North Korea (PRK); Kim Dong-gil; Kim Gyong-ho; Kim Yun-sob; Ri Ho-jun | South Korea (KOR); Kwon Jeong-keon; Min Kyung-il; Seo Jang-woon; Yoon Deok-ha |
| 1982 New Delhi | China (CHN); Jin Dongxiang; Lin Bo; Qiu Bo; Zhang Kezhong | South Korea (KOR); Kim Joon-young; Kwon Taek-yul; Seo Jang-woon; Yoon Deok-ha | North Korea (PRK); Hong Gwang-sik; Kim Dong-gil; Kim Gyong-ho; Kim Yun-sob |
| 1986 Seoul | South Korea (KOR); Chang Jae-kwan; Lee Eun-chul; Nam Hong-woo | China (CHN); Jiang Rong; Xu Xiaoguang; Zhang Yingzhou | Japan (JPN); Norito Chosa; Ryohei Koba; Hiroyuki Nakajo |
| 1990 Beijing | South Korea (KOR); Cha Young-chul; Lee Eun-chul; Lee See-hong | China (CHN); Jiang Rong; Xu Xiaoguang; Zhang Yingzhou | Japan (JPN); Ryohei Koba; Akihiro Mera; Masaru Yanagida |
| 1994 Hiroshima | South Korea (KOR); Cha Young-chul; Choi Byung-woo; Lee Eun-chul | Kazakhstan (KAZ); Sergey Belyayev; Alexandr Melsitov; Yuriy Melsitov | China (CHN); Cao Xiaojun; Jiang Rong; Ning Lijia |
| 1998 Bangkok | China (CHN); Cai Yalin; Ning Lijia; Shan Zhendong | South Korea (KOR); Cha Young-chul; Lee Eun-chul; Park Bong-duk | Thailand (THA); Nutchavapong Kuntawong; Tevarit Majchacheep; Varavut Majchacheep |
| 2002 Busan | China (CHN); Cai Yalin; Qiu Jian; Yao Ye | South Korea (KOR); Cha Young-chul; Nam Hyung-jin; Park Bong-duk | Kazakhstan (KAZ); Sergey Belyayev; Vitaliy Dovgun; Yuriy Melsitov |
| 2006 Doha | China (CHN); Liu Tianyou; Zhang Fu; Zhang Lei | Kazakhstan (KAZ); Vitaliy Dovgun; Yuriy Melsitov; Yuriy Yurkov | India (IND); Imran Hassan Khan; Gagan Narang; Sanjeev Rajput |
| 2010 Guangzhou | South Korea (KOR); Han Jin-seop; Kim Jong-hyun; Lee Hyun-tae | Kazakhstan (KAZ); Vitaliy Dovgun; Igor Pirekeyev; Yuriy Yurkov | China (CHN); Cao Yifei; Li Bo; Zhu Qinan |
| 2014 Incheon | China (CHN); Cao Yifei; Kang Hongwei; Zhu Qinan | South Korea (KOR); Han Jin-seop; Kim Jong-hyun; Kwon Jun-cheol | Japan (JPN); Takayuki Matsumoto; Midori Yajima; Toshikazu Yamashita |
| 2022 Hangzhou | India (IND); Swapnil Kusale; Akhil Sheoran; Aishwary Pratap Singh Tomar | China (CHN); Du Linshu; Tian Jiaming; Yu Hao | South Korea (KOR); Kim Jong-hyun; Kim Sang-do; Mo Dai-seong |

==== 50 m standard rifle 3 positions ====
- From 1966 to 1982, open to both genders

| Games | Gold | Silver | Bronze |
|---|---|---|---|
| 1966 Bangkok | Wu Tao-yuan (ROC) | Adolfo Feliciano (PHI) | Takao Ishii (JPN) |
| 1970 Bangkok | Shimon Friedman (ISR) | Preeda Phengdisth (THA) | Kazuya Ono (JPN) |
| 1974 Tehran | Han Dong-kyu (PRK) | Leng Guiying (CHN) | Somporn Onzhim (THA) |
| 1978 Bangkok | Kim Dong-gil (PRK) | Leng Guiying (CHN) | Ko Young-hee (KOR) |
| 1982 New Delhi | Yoon Deok-ha (KOR) | Kaoru Matsuo (JPN) | Pang Liqin (CHN) |
| 1986 Seoul | Qiu Bo (CHN) | Kaoru Matsuo (JPN) | Chinsen Thongkomol (THA) |

==== 50 m standard rifle 3 positions team ====
- From 1966 to 1982, open to both genders

| Games | Gold | Silver | Bronze |
|---|---|---|---|
| 1966 Bangkok | Japan (JPN); Takao Ishii; Junji Kido; Shigemi Saito; Kunio Tamai | Philippines (PHI); Leopoldo Ang; Roberto del Castillo; Lodovico Espinosa; Adolfo Feliciano | Thailand (THA); Krisda Arunvongse; Charumai Mahawat; Preeda Phengdisth; Salai Srisathorn |
| 1970 Bangkok | Thailand (THA); Serm Charuratana; Chawalit Kamutchati; Preeda Phengdisth; Udomsak Theinthong | Israel (ISR); Shimon Friedman; Henry Hershkowitz; Micha Kaufman; Zelig Shtorch | South Korea (KOR); Bae Byung-ki; Huh Wook-bong; Nam Sang-wan; Oh Gul |
| 1974 Tehran | North Korea (PRK); Choi Chang-yoon; Han Dong-kyu; Kim Gyong-ho; Ri Ho-jun | China (CHN); Cui Shunyou; Leng Guiying; Li Xiaohui; Liu Weisheng | Thailand (THA); Paisarn Chamornmarn; Chawalit Kamutchati; Somporn Onzhim; Padet Vejsavarn |
| 1978 Bangkok | China (CHN); Jin Dongxiang; Leng Guiying; Lin Bo; Mou Luhui | North Korea (PRK); Kim Dong-gil; Kim Gyong-ho; Kim Yun-sob; Ri Ho-jun | South Korea (KOR); Chang Kyung-il; Ko Young-hee; Seo Jang-woon; Yoon Deok-ha |
| 1982 New Delhi | China (CHN); Jin Dongxiang; Lin Bo; Pang Liqin; Qi Feng | South Korea (KOR); Kim Joon-young; Kwon Taek-yul; Seo Jang-woon; Yoon Deok-ha | Japan (JPN); Kaoru Matsuo; Hiroyuki Nakajo; Kimihiko Oura; Miyu Takeda |
| 1986 Seoul | China (CHN); Qiu Bo; Qiu Zeqing; Xu Xiaoguang | South Korea (KOR); Cha Young-chul; Chang Jae-kwan; Lee Eun-chul | India (IND); Joydip Das; Bhagirath Samai; Ghisa Lal Yadav |

==== 300 m rifle 3 positions ====
- From 1954 to 1962, open to both genders

| Games | Gold | Silver | Bronze |
|---|---|---|---|
| 1954 Manila | Hernando Castelo (PHI) | Martin Gison (PHI) | Dov Ben-Dov (ISR) |
| 1958 Tokyo | Adolfo Feliciano (PHI) | Wu Tao-yuan (ROC) | Tomokazu Maruyama (JPN) |
| 1962 Jakarta | Nam Sang-wan (KOR) | Elias Joseph Lessy (INA) | Saroch Silpikul (THA) |

==== 300 m standard rifle ====
| Games | Gold | Silver | Bronze |
|---|---|---|---|
| 2018 Jakarta–Palembang | Choi Young-jeon (KOR) | Hussain Al-Harbi (KSA) | Lee Won-gyu (KOR) |

=== Running target ===
==== 10 m running target ====
| Games | Gold | Silver | Bronze |
|---|---|---|---|
| 1990 Beijing | Ro Chol-sik (PRK) | Cai Zhiyong (CHN) | Zhang Ronghui (CHN) |
| 2002 Busan | Niu Zhiyuan (CHN) | Her Dae-kyung (KOR) | Yang Ling (CHN) |
| 2006 Doha | Gan Lin (CHN) | Rassim Mologly (KAZ) | Mohammed Amin Sobhi (QAT) |
| 2010 Guangzhou | Zhai Yujia (CHN) | Jo Yong-chol (PRK) | Jeong You-jin (KOR) |
| 2014 Incheon | Zhai Yujia (CHN) | Jo Yong-chol (PRK) | Bakhtiyar Ibrayev (KAZ) |
| 2018 Jakarta–Palembang | Jeong You-jin (KOR) | Pak Myong-won (PRK) | Ngô Hữu Vượng (VIE) |
| 2022 Hangzhou | Muhammad Sejahtera Dwi Putra (INA) | Ngô Hữu Vượng (VIE) | Jeong You-jin (KOR) |

==== 10 m running target team ====
| Games | Gold | Silver | Bronze |
|---|---|---|---|
| 1990 Beijing | China (CHN); Cai Zhiyong; Shu Qingquan; Zhang Ronghui | North Korea (PRK); Kim Man-chol; Pak Song-gil; Ro Chol-sik | South Korea (KOR); Hong Seung-pyo; Kim Woon-jin; Lee Yong-ryul |
| 2002 Busan | China (CHN); Niu Zhiyuan; Yang Ling; Zeng Guobin | South Korea (KOR); Cho Se-jong; Her Dae-kyung; Hwang Young-do | Kazakhstan (KAZ); Sergey Duzev; Andrey Gurov; Rustam Seitov |
| 2006 Doha | Kazakhstan (KAZ); Andrey Gurov; Bakhtiyar Ibrayev; Rassim Mologly | South Korea (KOR); Cho Se-jong; Hwang Young-do; Jeong You-jin | Qatar (QAT); Mohammed Abouteama; Khalid Al-Kuwari; Mohammed Amin Sobhi |
| 2010 Guangzhou | China (CHN); Gan Lin; Yang Ling; Zhai Yujia | North Korea (PRK); Jo Yong-chol; Kim Ji-song; Pak Myong-won | Kazakhstan (KAZ); Andrey Gurov; Bakhtiyar Ibrayev; Rassim Mologly |
| 2014 Incheon | China (CHN); Gan Yu; Zhai Yujia; Zhang Jie | North Korea (PRK); Jo Yong-chol; Kim Ji-song; Pak Myong-won | Kazakhstan (KAZ); Andrey Gurov; Bakhtiyar Ibrayev; Rassim Mologly |
| 2022 Hangzhou | South Korea (KOR); Ha Kwang-chul; Jeong You-jin; Kwak Yong-bin | North Korea (PRK); Kwon Kwang-il; Pak Myong-won; Yu Song-jun | Indonesia (INA); Muhammad Badri Akbar; Irfandi Julio; Muhammad Sejahtera Dwi Putra |

==== 10 m running target mixed ====
| Games | Gold | Silver | Bronze |
|---|---|---|---|
| 2006 Doha | Gan Lin (CHN) | Bakhtiyar Ibrayev (KAZ) | Andrey Gurov (KAZ) |
| 2010 Guangzhou | Pak Myong-won (PRK) | Zhai Yujia (CHN) | Gan Lin (CHN) |
| 2014 Incheon | Kim Ji-song (PRK) | Zhai Yujia (CHN) | Jeong You-jin (KOR) |
| 2018 Jakarta–Palembang | Pak Myong-won (PRK) | Muhammad Sejahtera Dwi Putra (INA) | Gan Yu (CHN) |
| 2022 Hangzhou | Muhammad Sejahtera Dwi Putra (INA) | Kwon Kwang-il (PRK) | Jeong You-jin (KOR) |

==== 10 m running target mixed team ====
| Games | Gold | Silver | Bronze |
|---|---|---|---|
| 2006 Doha | Kazakhstan (KAZ); Andrey Gurov; Bakhtiyar Ibrayev; Rassim Mologly | Qatar (QAT); Mohammed Abouteama; Khalid Al-Kuwari; Mohammed Amin Sobhi | Vietnam (VIE); Nguyễn Mạnh Cường; Nguyễn Văn Tùng; Trần Hoàng Vũ |
| 2010 Guangzhou | North Korea (PRK); Jo Yong-chol; Kim Ji-song; Pak Myong-won | China (CHN); Gan Lin; Yang Ling; Zhai Yujia | South Korea (KOR); Cho Se-jong; Hwang Young-do; Jeong You-jin |
| 2014 Incheon | China (CHN); Xie Durun; Zhai Yujia; Zhang Jie | North Korea (PRK); Jo Yong-chol; Kim Ji-song; Pak Myong-won | Vietnam (VIE); Đỗ Đức Hùng; Ngô Hữu Vượng; Trần Hoàng Vũ |
| 2022 Hangzhou | South Korea (KOR); Ha Kwang-chul; Jeong You-jin; Kwak Yong-bin | Kazakhstan (KAZ); Bakhtiyar Ibrayev; Andrey Khudyakov; Assadbek Nazirkulyev | Indonesia (INA); Muhammad Badri Akbar; Irfandi Julio; Muhammad Sejahtera Dwi Putra |

==== 50 m running target ====
| Games | Gold | Silver | Bronze |
|---|---|---|---|
| 1990 Beijing | Ji Gang (CHN) | Hong Seung-pyo (KOR) | Ro Chol-sik (PRK) |

==== 50 m running target team ====
| Games | Gold | Silver | Bronze |
|---|---|---|---|
| 1990 Beijing | China (CHN); Huang Shiping; Ji Gang; Shu Qingquan | North Korea (PRK); Kim Gwang-chol; Kim Man-chol; Ro Chol-sik | South Korea (KOR); Hong Seung-pyo; Kim Woon-jin; Lee Yong-ryul |

==== 50 m running target mixed ====
| Games | Gold | Silver | Bronze |
|---|---|---|---|
| 1990 Beijing | Huang Shiping (CHN) | Kim Gwang-chol (PRK) | Hong Seung-pyo (KOR) |

==== 50 m running target mixed team ====
| Games | Gold | Silver | Bronze |
|---|---|---|---|
| 1990 Beijing | China (CHN); Huang Shiping; Ji Gang; Zhang Ronghui | North Korea (PRK); Kim Gwang-chol; Kim Man-chol; Pak Song-gil | South Korea (KOR); Her Dae-kyung; Hong Seung-pyo; Lee Yong-ryul |

=== Shotgun ===
==== Trap ====
- From 1954 to 1986, open to both genders

| Games | Gold | Silver | Bronze |
|---|---|---|---|
| 1954 Manila | Masao Fujita (JPN) | Tokusaburo Iwata (JPN) | Enrique Beech (PHI) |
| 1958 Tokyo | Ujitoshi Konomi (JPN) | Tsai Pai-sheng (ROC) | Enrique Beech (PHI) |
| 1974 Tehran | Jitsuka Matsuoka (JPN) | Karni Singh (IND) | George Earnshaw (PHI) |
| 1978 Bangkok | Randhir Singh (IND) | Mitsuyoshi Kodaira (JPN) | Noh Jeong-sik (KOR) |
| 1982 New Delhi | Kazumi Watanabe (JPN) | Yu Haiquan (CHN) | Randhir Singh (IND) |
| 1986 Seoul | Byun Kyung-soo (KOR) | Peter Lim (MAL) | Zhang Gang (CHN) |
| 1990 Beijing | Pae Won-guk (PRK) | Zhang Yongjie (CHN) | Chng Seng Mok (SIN) |
| 1994 Hiroshima | Zhang Bing (CHN) | Park Chul-sung (KOR) | Fehaid Al-Deehani (KUW) |
| 1998 Bangkok | Fehaid Al-Deehani (KUW) | Fahad Al-Deehani (KUW) | Pae Won-guk (PRK) |
| 2002 Busan | Li Hui (CHN) | Zhang Yongjie (CHN) | Jethro Dionisio (PHI) |
| 2006 Doha | Naser Al-Meqlad (KUW) | Manavjit Singh Sandhu (IND) | Khaled Al-Mudhaf (KUW) |
| 2010 Guangzhou | Naser Al-Meqlad (IOC) | Khaled Al-Mudhaf (IOC) | Joe Salem (LIB) |
| 2014 Incheon | Gao Bo (CHN) | Fehaid Al-Deehani (KUW) | Andrey Mogilevskiy (KAZ) |
| 2018 Jakarta–Palembang | Yang Kun-pi (TPE) | Lakshay Sheoran (IND) | Ahn Dae-myeong (KOR) |
| 2022 Hangzhou | Qi Ying (CHN) | Talal Al-Rashidi (KUW) | Kynan Chenai (IND) |

==== Trap team ====
- From 1974 to 1986, open to both genders

| Games | Gold | Silver | Bronze |
|---|---|---|---|
| 1974 Tehran | Japan (JPN); T. Hisashi; Toshiyasu Ishige; Jitsuka Matsuoka; Masao Obara | Thailand (THA); Vudha Bhirombhakdi; Pavitr Gajaseni; Dipya Mongkollugsana; Phairoj Rodjaroen | South Korea (KOR); Choi Jeong-yong; Kim Nam-gu; Lee Chong-tae; Yun Moo-ung |
| 1978 Bangkok | Japan (JPN); Mitsuyoshi Kodaira; Kan Numajiri; Masao Obara; Kazumi Watanabe | South Korea (KOR); Choi Jeong-yong; Lee Moon-ho; Lee Suk-woo; Noh Jeong-sik | Thailand (THA); Vichien Chaveewong; Pavitr Gajaseni; Damrong Pachonyut; Phairoj Rodjaroen |
| 1982 New Delhi | China (CHN); Li Jinglong; Yu Haiquan; Zhang Gang; Zhang Huiqun | India (IND); Pranab Kumar Roy; Gurbir Singh; Karni Singh; Randhir Singh | Japan (JPN); Motoharu Hirano; Masao Obara; Akira Umezu; Kazumi Watanabe |
| 1986 Seoul | Japan (JPN); Yoshihiro Igarashi; Masao Obara; Toshiyuki Yamane | South Korea (KOR); Byun Kyung-soo; Eom Tae-jin; Park Chul-sung | China (CHN); Li Jinglong; Zhang Gang; Zhao Guisheng |
| 1990 Beijing | North Korea (PRK); Kim Hak-song; Pae Won-guk; Ri Gil-ryong | China (CHN); Chai Wenbin; Zhang Bing; Zhang Yongjie | Japan (JPN); Yoshihiro Igarashi; Masao Obara; Kazumi Watanabe |
| 1994 Hiroshima | Kuwait (KUW); Fahad Al-Deehani; Fehaid Al-Deehani; Khalaf Al-Otaibi | China (CHN); Xu Hongtao; Zhang Bing; Zhang Yongjie | South Korea (KOR); Kim Tae-suk; Oh Keum-pyo; Park Chul-sung |
| 1998 Bangkok | Kuwait (KUW); Fahad Al-Deehani; Fehaid Al-Deehani; Khaled Al-Mudhaf | India (IND); Manavjit Singh Sandhu; Zoravar Singh Sandhu; Mansher Singh | China (CHN); Huang Lixin; Li Bo; Zhang Bing |
| 2002 Busan | China (CHN); Huang Lixin; Li Hui; Zhang Yongjie | India (IND); Manavjit Singh Sandhu; Mansher Singh; Anwer Sultan | Philippines (PHI); Eric Ang; Jethro Dionisio; Jaime Recio |
| 2006 Doha | Kuwait (KUW); Abdulrahman Al-Faihan; Naser Al-Meqlad; Khaled Al-Mudhaf | India (IND); Manavjit Singh Sandhu; Mansher Singh; Anwer Sultan | Lebanon (LIB); Talih Bou Kamel; Joseph Hanna; Joe Salem |
| 2010 Guangzhou | Athletes from Kuwait (IOC); Abdulrahman Al-Faihan; Naser Al-Meqlad; Khaled Al-Mudhaf | Lebanon (LIB); Abdo Al-Yazgie; Joseph Hanna; Joe Salem | India (IND); Manavjit Singh Sandhu; Zoravar Singh Sandhu; Mansher Singh |
| 2014 Incheon | China (CHN); Du Yu; Gao Bo; Zhang Yiyao | Kuwait (KUW); Fehaid Al-Deehani; Abdulrahman Al-Faihan; Khaled Al-Mudhaf | South Korea (KOR); Jung Chang-hee; Lee Young-sik; Shin Hyun-woo |
| 2022 Hangzhou | India (IND); Kynan Chenai; Zoravar Singh Sandhu; Prithviraj Tondaiman | Kuwait (KUW); Abdulrahman Al-Faihan; Khaled Al-Mudhaf; Talal Al-Rashidi | China (CHN); Guo Yuhao; Qi Ying; Wang Yuhao |

==== Double trap ====
| Games | Gold | Silver | Bronze |
|---|---|---|---|
| 1994 Hiroshima | Fehaid Al-Deehani (KUW) | Zhang Bing (CHN) | Zhang Yongjie (CHN) |
| 1998 Bangkok | Hu Binyuan (CHN) | Li Bo (CHN) | Mashfi Al-Mutairi (KUW) |
| 2002 Busan | Chen Shih-wei (TPE) | Shih Wei-tin (TPE) | Jung Yoon-kyun (KOR) |
| 2006 Doha | Wang Nan (CHN) | Hu Binyuan (CHN) | Rajyavardhan Singh Rathore (IND) |
| 2010 Guangzhou | Ronjan Sodhi (IND) | Juma Al-Maktoum (UAE) | Hamad Al-Marri (QAT) |
| 2014 Incheon | Hu Binyuan (CHN) | Fehaid Al-Deehani (KUW) | Juma Al-Maktoum (UAE) |
| 2018 Jakarta–Palembang | Shin Hyun-woo (KOR) | Shardul Vihan (IND) | Hamad Al-Marri (QAT) |

==== Double trap team ====
| Games | Gold | Silver | Bronze |
|---|---|---|---|
| 1998 Bangkok | China (CHN); Hu Binyuan; Li Bo; Zhang Bing | Kuwait (KUW); Fehaid Al-Deehani; Mashfi Al-Mutairi; Mubarak Al-Rashidi | Singapore (SIN); Chng Seng Mok; Lee Wung Yew; Tan Chee Keong |
| 2002 Busan | South Korea (KOR); Jung Yoon-kyun; Kim Byoung-jun; Park Jung-hwan | China (CHN); Hu Binyuan; Li Bo; Li Shuangchun | Chinese Taipei (TPE); Chen Shih-wei; Lin Chin-hsien; Shih Wei-tin |
| 2006 Doha | China (CHN); Hu Binyuan; Liu Anlong; Wang Nan | India (IND); Vikram Bhatnagar; Rajyavardhan Singh Rathore; Ronjan Sodhi | Chinese Taipei (TPE); Chang Chien Ming-shan; Chen Shih-wei; Shih Wei-tin |
| 2010 Guangzhou | China (CHN); Hu Binyuan; Mo Junjie; Pan Qiang | Athletes from Kuwait (IOC); Hamad Al-Afasi; Fehaid Al-Deehani; Mashfi Al-Mutairi | India (IND); Vikram Bhatnagar; Asher Noria; Ronjan Sodhi |
| 2014 Incheon | Qatar (QAT); Masoud Hamad Al-Athba; Rashid Hamad Al-Athba; Hamad Al-Marri | China (CHN); Hu Binyuan; Li Jun; Mo Junjie | Kuwait (KUW); Ahmad Al-Afasi; Hamad Al-Afasi; Fehaid Al-Deehani |

==== Skeet ====
- From 1974 to 1986, open to both genders

| Games | Gold | Silver | Bronze |
|---|---|---|---|
| 1974 Tehran | Taro Aso (JPN) | Lee Seung-kyun (KOR) | Karni Singh (IND) |
| 1978 Bangkok | Sakae Aoyagi (JPN) | Lee Seung-kyun (KOR) | Guo Li (CHN) |
| 1982 New Delhi | Zhu Changfu (CHN) | Ma Il-nam (PRK) | Kim Ki-woon (KOR) |
| 1986 Seoul | Zhang Weigang (CHN) | Wang Zhonghua (CHN) | Lim Dong-ki (KOR) |
| 1990 Beijing | Wang Zhonghua (CHN) | O Chang-sok (PRK) | Sin Nam-ho (PRK) |
| 1994 Hiroshima | Saeed Al-Mutairi (KSA) | Zhang Xindong (CHN) | Ivan Struchayev (KAZ) |
| 1998 Bangkok | Sergey Yakshin (KAZ) | Abdullah Al-Rashidi (KUW) | Li Xu (CHN) |
| 2002 Busan | Masoud Saleh Al-Athba (QAT) | Jin Di (CHN) | Alexey Ponomarev (KAZ) |
| 2006 Doha | Salah Al-Mutairi (KUW) | Saeed Al-Maktoum (UAE) | Jin Di (CHN) |
| 2010 Guangzhou | Abdullah Al-Rashidi (IOC) | Masoud Saleh Al-Athba (QAT) | Nasser Al-Attiyah (QAT) |
| 2014 Incheon | Abdullah Al-Rashidi (KUW) | Xu Ying (CHN) | Jin Di (CHN) |
| 2018 Jakarta–Palembang | Mansour Al-Rashidi (KUW) | Jin Di (CHN) | Saif Bin Futtais (UAE) |
| 2022 Hangzhou | Abdullah Al-Rashidi (KUW) | Anantjeet Singh Naruka (IND) | Nasser Al-Attiyah (QAT) |

==== Skeet team ====
- From 1974 to 1986, open to both genders

| Games | Gold | Silver | Bronze |
|---|---|---|---|
| 1974 Tehran | South Korea (KOR); Chang Je-keun; Lee Seung-kyun; Park Do-keun; Suh Hyun-joo | Japan (JPN); Taro Aso; Jitsuka Matsuoka; H. Takamatsu; Kazumi Watanabe | Malaysia (MAL); Stanley Lim; Ally Ong; Yap Pow Thong; Edmund Yong |
| 1978 Bangkok | Japan (JPN); Sakae Aoyagi; Tsugio Hata; Hitoshi Hiraoka; Toshitsugu Takafuji | South Korea (KOR); Choi Hyun-joo; Kim Young-il; Kim Young-jin; Lee Seung-kyun | China (CHN); Guo Li; Jin Yaokang; Wu Lanying; Yue Ming |
| 1982 New Delhi | China (CHN); Guo Li; Jin Yueqing; Yue Ming; Zhu Changfu | North Korea (PRK); Ma Il-nam; Ra Sang-uk; Ri Jong; Sin Nam-ho | Japan (JPN); Tsugio Hata; Mikio Itakura; Toshitsugu Takafuji; Tomoya Yamashita |
| 1986 Seoul | China (CHN); Wang Zhonghua; Yue Ming; Zhang Weigang | South Korea (KOR); Kim Young-jin; Lee Seung-kyun; Lim Dong-ki | Japan (JPN); Tadayoshi Ando; Isamu Aoki; Yasumasa Furo |
| 1990 Beijing | North Korea (PRK); O Chang-sok; Ra Sang-uk; Sin Nam-ho | South Korea (KOR); Jeon Chan-sik; Kim Ha-yeon; Lim Dong-ki | China (CHN); Wang Yongwei; Wang Zhonghua; Zhang Weigang |
| 1994 Hiroshima | Kazakhstan (KAZ); Sergey Kolos; Sergey Shakhvorostov; Ivan Struchayev | China (CHN); Wang Zhonghua; Zhang Weigang; Zhang Xindong | Kuwait (KUW); Sayer Al-Deehani; Salah Al-Mutairi; Abdullah Al-Rashidi |
| 1998 Bangkok | Kuwait (KUW); Salah Al-Mutairi; Abdullah Al-Rashidi; Tami Al-Rashidi | China (CHN); Chen Dongjie; Li Xu; Zhang Xindong | Kazakhstan (KAZ); Sergey Kolos; Ivan Struchayev; Sergey Yakshin |
| 2002 Busan | Qatar (QAT); Masoud Saleh Al-Athba; Nasser Al-Attiyah; Ahmed Al-Kuwari | Kazakhstan (KAZ); Sergey Kolos; Alexey Ponomarev; Sergey Yakshin | China (CHN); Chen Dong; Jin Di; Zhang Kaiyan |
| 2006 Doha | Kazakhstan (KAZ); Sergey Kolos; Vladislav Mukhamediyev; Sergey Yakshin | Kuwait (KUW); Salah Al-Mutairi; Zaid Al-Mutairi; Abdullah Al-Rashidi | China (CHN); Jin Di; Li Xu; Qu Ridong |
| 2010 Guangzhou | Qatar (QAT); Masoud Saleh Al-Athba; Abdulaziz Al-Attiyah; Nasser Al-Attiyah | Athletes from Kuwait (IOC); Salah Al-Mutairi; Zaid Al-Mutairi; Abdullah Al-Rashidi | China (CHN); Jin Di; Qu Ridong; Tang Shuai |
| 2014 Incheon | China (CHN); Jin Di; Xu Ying; Zhang Fan | Kuwait (KUW); Salah Al-Mutairi; Abdullah Al-Rashidi; Saud Habib | South Korea (KOR); Cho Min-ki; Hwang Jung-soo; Lee Jong-jun |
| 2022 Hangzhou | China (CHN); Han Xu; Liu Jiangchi; Wu Yunxuan | Qatar (QAT); Masoud Saleh Al-Athba; Rashid Saleh Al-Athba; Nasser Al-Attiyah | India (IND); Angad Vir Singh Bajwa; Gurjoat Siingh Khangura; Anantjeet Singh Naruka |

== Women ==
=== Pistol ===
==== 10 m air pistol ====
| Games | Gold | Silver | Bronze |
|---|---|---|---|
| 1986 Seoul | Tomoko Hasegawa (JPN) | Rampai Yamfang (THA) | Bang Hyun-joo (KOR) |
| 1990 Beijing | Wang Lina (CHN) | Li Duihong (CHN) | Lee Sun-bok (KOR) |
| 1994 Hiroshima | Fan Xiaoping (CHN) | Dorjsürengiin Mönkhbayar (MGL) | Yoko Inada (JPN) |
| 1998 Bangkok | Dina Aspandiyarova (KAZ) | Cai Yeqing (CHN) | Ren Jie (CHN) |
| 2002 Busan | Tao Luna (CHN) | Ren Jie (CHN) | Park Jung-hee (KOR) |
| 2006 Doha | Tao Luna (CHN) | Guo Wenjun (CHN) | Kim Byung-hee (KOR) |
| 2010 Guangzhou | Kim Yun-mi (KOR) | Sun Qi (CHN) | Jo Yong-suk (PRK) |
| 2014 Incheon | Zhang Mengyuan (CHN) | Jung Jee-hae (KOR) | Shweta Chaudhary (IND) |
| 2018 Jakarta–Palembang | Wang Qian (CHN) | Kim Min-jung (KOR) | Heena Sidhu (IND) |
| 2022 Hangzhou | Palak Gulia (IND) | Esha Singh (IND) | Kishmala Talat (PAK) |

==== 10 m air pistol team ====
| Games | Gold | Silver | Bronze |
|---|---|---|---|
| 1986 Seoul | Japan (JPN); Tomoko Hasegawa; Hisayo Hayakawa; Etsuko Onobuchi | China (CHN); Cai Shan; Wen Zhifang; Zhu Yuqin | South Korea (KOR); Bang Hyun-joo; Kim Hye-yeong; Kim Yang-ja |
| 1990 Beijing | China (CHN); Li Duihong; Liu Haiying; Wang Lina | South Korea (KOR); Boo Soon-hee; Hong Young-ok; Lee Sun-bok | North Korea (PRK); Kim Jong-sil; Paek Jong-suk; Ri Hyang-suk |
| 1994 Hiroshima | China (CHN); Fan Xiaoping; Li Duihong; Wang Lina | Japan (JPN); Yoko Inada; Kagumi Komori; Keiko Yoshimoto | South Korea (KOR); Boo Soon-hee; Lee Sun-bok; Park Jung-hee |
| 1998 Bangkok | China (CHN); Cai Yeqing; Ren Jie; Tao Luna | Kazakhstan (KAZ); Dina Aspandiyarova; Galina Belyayeva; Yuliya Bondareva | South Korea (KOR); Boo Soon-hee; Kim Mi-jung; Ko Jin-sook |
| 2002 Busan | China (CHN); Chen Ying; Ren Jie; Tao Luna | Kazakhstan (KAZ); Zauresh Baibussinova; Galina Belyayeva; Yuliya Bondareva | South Korea (KOR); Gang Eun-ra; Ko Jin-sook; Park Jung-hee |
| 2006 Doha | China (CHN); Chen Ying; Guo Wenjun; Tao Luna | India (IND); Shweta Chaudhary; Sonia Rai; Harveen Srao | South Korea (KOR); Boo Soon-hee; Kim Byung-hee; Lee Ho-lim |
| 2010 Guangzhou | South Korea (KOR); Kim Byung-hee; Kim Yun-mi; Lee Ho-lim | India (IND); Sonia Rai; Heena Sidhu; Annu Raj Singh | China (CHN); Guo Wenjun; Su Yuling; Sun Qi |
| 2014 Incheon | China (CHN); Guo Wenjun; Zhang Mengyuan; Zhou Qingyuan | Chinese Taipei (TPE); Tien Chia-chen; Tu Yi Yi-tzu; Wu Chia-ying | Mongolia (MGL); Tömörchödöriin Bayartsetseg; Otryadyn Gündegmaa; Tsogbadrakhyn Mönkhzul |
| 2022 Hangzhou | China (CHN); Jiang Ranxin; Li Xue; Zhao Nan | India (IND); Palak Gulia; Esha Singh; Divya T. S. | Chinese Taipei (TPE); Liu Heng-yu; Wu Chia-ying; Yu Ai-wen |

==== 25 m pistol ====
| Games | Gold | Silver | Bronze |
|---|---|---|---|
| 1986 Seoul | Wen Zhifang (CHN) | Tomoko Hasegawa (JPN) | Zhu Yuqin (CHN) |
| 1990 Beijing | Li Duihong (CHN) | Wang Lina (CHN) | Qi Chunxia (CHN) |
| 1994 Hiroshima | Fan Xiaoping (CHN) | Boo Soon-hee (KOR) | Li Duihong (CHN) |
| 1998 Bangkok | Cai Yeqing (CHN) | Yuliya Bondareva (KAZ) | Cao Ying (CHN) |
| 2002 Busan | Chen Ying (CHN) | Tao Luna (CHN) | Otryadyn Gündegmaa (MGL) |
| 2006 Doha | Chen Ying (CHN) | Tao Luna (CHN) | Kim Byung-hee (KOR) |
| 2010 Guangzhou | Jo Yong-suk (PRK) | Yukari Mori (JPN) | Lee Ho-lim (KOR) |
| 2014 Incheon | Zhang Jingjing (CHN) | Chen Ying (CHN) | Otryadyn Gündegmaa (MGL) |
| 2018 Jakarta–Palembang | Rahi Sarnobat (IND) | Naphaswan Yangpaiboon (THA) | Kim Min-jung (KOR) |
| 2022 Hangzhou | Liu Rui (CHN) | Esha Singh (IND) | Yang Ji-in (KOR) |

==== 25 m pistol team ====
| Games | Gold | Silver | Bronze |
|---|---|---|---|
| 1986 Seoul | China (CHN); Qi Chunxia; Wen Zhifang; Zhu Yuqin | Japan (JPN); Tomoko Hasegawa; Keiko Kato; Atsuko Sugimoto | Thailand (THA); Promthida Chakshuraksha; Angsuman Jotikasthira; Rampai Yamfang |
| 1990 Beijing | China (CHN); Li Duihong; Wang Lina; Qi Chunxia | South Korea (KOR); Boo Soon-hee; Hong Young-ok; Kim Hye-yeong | North Korea (PRK); Kim Jong-sil; Paek Jong-suk; Ra Jong-suk |
| 1994 Hiroshima | China (CHN); Fan Xiaoping; Li Duihong; Wang Lina | South Korea (KOR); Boo Soon-hee; Cho Mi-kyung; Park Jung-hee | Kazakhstan (KAZ); Dina Aspandiyarova; Zauresh Baibussinova; Galina Belyayeva |
| 1998 Bangkok | China (CHN); Cai Yeqing; Cao Ying; Li Duihong | Kazakhstan (KAZ); Dina Aspandiyarova; Galina Belyayeva; Yuliya Bondareva | Mongolia (MGL); Otryadyn Gündegmaa; Dorjsürengiin Mönkhbayar; Davaajantsangiin Oyuun |
| 2002 Busan | China (CHN); Chen Ying; Li Duihong; Tao Luna | Japan (JPN); Michiko Fukushima; Yukari Konishi; Yuki Yoshida | Kazakhstan (KAZ); Zauresh Baibussinova; Galina Belyayeva; Yuliya Bondareva |
| 2006 Doha | China (CHN); Cao Ying; Chen Ying; Tao Luna | Japan (JPN); Michiko Fukushima; Yoko Inada; Yukari Konishi | Mongolia (MGL); Otryadyn Gündegmaa; Gantömöriin Kherlentsetseg; Tsogbadrakhyn Mönkhzul |
| 2010 Guangzhou | Kazakhstan (KAZ); Zauresh Baibussinova; Galina Belyayeva; Yuliya Drishlyuk | Mongolia (MGL); Tömörchödöriin Bayartsetseg; Otryadyn Gündegmaa; Tsogbadrakhyn Mönkhzul | South Korea (KOR); Kim Byung-hee; Lee Ho-lim; Park Hye-soo |
| 2014 Incheon | South Korea (KOR); Kim Jang-mi; Kwak Jung-hye; Lee Jung-eun | China (CHN); Chen Ying; Zhang Jingjing; Zhou Qingyuan | India (IND); Rahi Sarnobat; Anisa Sayyed; Heena Sidhu |
| 2022 Hangzhou | India (IND); Manu Bhaker; Rhythm Sangwan; Esha Singh | China (CHN); Feng Sixuan; Liu Rui; Zhao Nan | South Korea (KOR); Kim Lan-a; Sim Eun-ji; Yang Ji-in |

=== Rifle ===
==== 10 m air rifle ====
| Games | Gold | Silver | Bronze |
|---|---|---|---|
| 1986 Seoul | Park Jeong-ah (KOR) | Lee Hong-ki (KOR) | Soma Dutta (IND) |
| 1990 Beijing | Xu Yanhua (CHN) | Zhang Qiuping (CHN) | Chon Un-ju (PRK) |
| 1994 Hiroshima | Lee Eun-ju (KOR) | Zhang Qiuping (CHN) | Yeo Kab-soon (KOR) |
| 1998 Bangkok | Kim Jung-mi (KOR) | Thanyarat Pupiromchaikul (THA) | Zhao Yinghui (CHN) |
| 2002 Busan | Zhao Yinghui (CHN) | Gao Jing (CHN) | Park Un-kyong (KOR) |
| 2006 Doha | Du Li (CHN) | Zhao Yinghui (CHN) | Olga Dovgun (KAZ) |
| 2010 Guangzhou | Yi Siling (CHN) | Wu Liuxi (CHN) | Nur Suryani Taibi (MAS) |
| 2014 Incheon | Najmeh Khedmati (IRI) | Narjes Emamgholinejad (IRI) | Zhang Binbin (CHN) |
| 2018 Jakarta–Palembang | Zhao Ruozhu (CHN) | Jung Eun-hea (KOR) | Gankhuyagiin Nandinzayaa (MGL) |
| 2022 Hangzhou | Huang Yuting (CHN) | Han Jiayu (CHN) | Ramita Jindal (IND) |

==== 10 m air rifle team ====
| Games | Gold | Silver | Bronze |
|---|---|---|---|
| 1986 Seoul | South Korea (KOR); Kang Hye-ja; Lee Hong-ki; Park Jeong-ah | China (CHN); Guo Fengjuan; Li Dan; Zhang Qiuping | Japan (JPN); Reiko Kasai; Kyoko Kinoshita; Noriko Kosai |
| 1990 Beijing | China (CHN); Li Dan; Xu Yanhua; Zhang Qiuping | South Korea (KOR); Jin Soon-young; Lee Eun-ju; Yoon Soon-nam | Japan (JPN); Noriko Kosai; Yoko Minamoto; Noriko Ojima |
| 1994 Hiroshima | South Korea (KOR); Lee Eun-ju; Oh Mi-ran; Yeo Kab-soon | China (CHN); Chen Muhua; Xu Yanhua; Zhang Qiuping | Thailand (THA); Jarintorn Dangpiam; Thanyarat Pupiromchaikul; Nattichata Siththipong |
| 1998 Bangkok | Thailand (THA); Jarintorn Dangpiam; Nuanwan Kerdsumran; Thanyarat Pupiromchaikul | South Korea (KOR); Kim Jung-mi; Lee Ki-young; Yeo Kab-soon | China (CHN); Shan Hong; Wang Xian; Zhao Yinghui |
| 2002 Busan | China (CHN); Du Li; Gao Jing; Zhao Yinghui | India (IND); Anjali Bhagwat; Deepali Deshpande; Suma Shirur | South Korea (KOR); Kim Hyung-mi; Park Un-kyong; Seo Sun-hwa |
| 2006 Doha | China (CHN); Du Li; Wu Liuxi; Zhao Yinghui | Singapore (SIN); Adrienne Ser; Jasmine Ser; Vanessa Yong | India (IND); Tejaswini Sawant; Suma Shirur; Avneet Sidhu |
| 2010 Guangzhou | China (CHN); Wu Liuxi; Yi Siling; Yu Dan | Iran (IRI); Elaheh Ahmadi; Narjes Emamgholinejad; Mahlagha Jambozorg | Uzbekistan (UZB); Yana Fatkhi; Elena Kuznetsova; Sakina Mamedova |
| 2014 Incheon | China (CHN); Wu Liuxi; Yi Siling; Zhang Binbin | Iran (IRI); Elaheh Ahmadi; Narjes Emamgholinejad; Najmeh Khedmati | South Korea (KOR); Jeong Mi-ra; Kim Gae-nam; Kim Seol-a |
| 2022 Hangzhou | China (CHN); Han Jiayu; Huang Yuting; Wang Zhilin | India (IND); Ashi Chouksey; Mehuli Ghosh; Ramita Jindal | Mongolia (MGL); Gankhuyagiin Nandinzayaa; Chuluunbadrakhyn Narantuyaa; Oyuunbatyn Yesügen |

==== 50 m rifle prone ====
| Games | Gold | Silver | Bronze |
|---|---|---|---|
| 1990 Beijing | Zhang Qiuping (CHN) | Chong Chun-ok (PRK) | Soma Dutta (IND) |
| 1994 Hiroshima | Cho Eun-young (KOR) | Noriko Ojima (JPN) | Zhang Qiuping (CHN) |
| 1998 Bangkok | Wang Xian (CHN) | Yoko Minamoto (JPN) | Noriko Ojima (JPN) |
| 2002 Busan | Olga Dovgun (KAZ) | Lee Mi-kyung (KOR) | Elena Kostyukova (KGZ) |
| 2006 Doha | Olga Dovgun (KAZ) | Thanyalak Chotphibunsin (THA) | Wang Chengyi (CHN) |
| 2010 Guangzhou | Wang Chengyi (CHN) | Olga Dovgun (KAZ) | Seiko Iwata (JPN) |
| 2014 Incheon | Chuluunbadrakhyn Narantuyaa (MGL) | Nur Suryani Taibi (MAS) | Eum Bit-na (KOR) |

==== 50 m rifle prone team ====
| Games | Gold | Silver | Bronze |
|---|---|---|---|
| 1990 Beijing | North Korea (PRK); Chon Un-ju; Chong Chun-ok; Ri Jong-ae | China (CHN); Rui Qing; Zhang Qiuping; Zhou Danhong | South Korea (KOR); Kang Myong-a; Kim Mi-hyang; Lee Hye-kyung |
| 1994 Hiroshima | South Korea (KOR); Cho Eun-young; Kong Hyun-ah; Seo Min-young | China (CHN); Liu Shibin; Zhang Qiuping; Zhou Danhong | Japan (JPN); Junki Enoki; Yoko Minamoto; Noriko Ojima |
| 1998 Bangkok | Japan (JPN); Yoko Minamoto; Noriko Ojima; Mari Onoe | China (CHN); Shan Hong; Wang Xian; Zhao Ying | Thailand (THA); Jarintorn Dangpiam; Tiranan Khajornklinmala; Thanyarat Pupiromchaikul |
| 2002 Busan | South Korea (KOR); Kong Hyun-ah; Lee Mi-kyung; Lee Sun-min | China (CHN); Gao Jing; Shan Hong; Wang Xian | Kazakhstan (KAZ); Olga Dovgun; Galina Korchma; Varvara Kovalenko |
| 2006 Doha | Thailand (THA); Thanyalak Chotphibunsin; Paramaporn Ponglaokham; Supamas Wankaew | China (CHN); Liu Bo; Wang Chengyi; Wu Liuxi | Kazakhstan (KAZ); Olga Dovgun; Galina Korchma; Varvara Kovalenko |
| 2010 Guangzhou | South Korea (KOR); Kim Jung-mi; Kwon Na-ra; Lee Yun-chae | Thailand (THA); Vitchuda Pichitkanjanakul; Ratchadaporn Plengsaengthong; Supamas Wankaew | China (CHN); Hou Xiaoyu; Huang Na; Wang Chengyi |
| 2014 Incheon | South Korea (KOR); Eum Bit-na; Jeong Mi-ra; Na Yoon-kyung | China (CHN); Chang Jing; Chen Dongqi; Yi Siling | Malaysia (MAS); Nur Ayuni Farhana; Nur Suryani Taibi; Muslifah Zulkifli |

==== 50 m rifle 3 positions ====
| Games | Gold | Silver | Bronze |
|---|---|---|---|
| 1986 Seoul | Zhou Danhong (CHN) | Soma Dutta (IND) | Jin Dongxiang (CHN) |
| 1990 Beijing | Yoko Minamoto (JPN) | Xu Yanhua (CHN) | Zhou Danhong (CHN) |
| 1994 Hiroshima | Noriko Ojima (JPN) | Xu Yanhua (CHN) | Zhang Qiuping (CHN) |
| 1998 Bangkok | Shan Hong (CHN) | Olga Dovgun (KAZ) | Kong Hyun-ah (KOR) |
| 2002 Busan | Du Li (CHN) | Olga Dovgun (KAZ) | Wang Xian (CHN) |
| 2006 Doha | Wang Chengyi (CHN) | Olga Dovgun (KAZ) | Na Yoon-kyung (KOR) |
| 2010 Guangzhou | Wang Chengyi (CHN) | Elaheh Ahmadi (IRI) | Wu Liuxi (CHN) |
| 2014 Incheon | Olga Dovgun (KAZ) | Jeong Mi-ra (KOR) | Chang Jing (CHN) |
| 2018 Jakarta–Palembang | Gankhuyagiin Nandinzayaa (MGL) | Chuluunbadrakhyn Narantuyaa (MGL) | Mahlagha Jambozorg (IRI) |
| 2022 Hangzhou | Sift Kaur Samra (IND) | Zhang Qiongyue (CHN) | Ashi Chouksey (IND) |

==== 50 m rifle 3 positions team ====
| Games | Gold | Silver | Bronze |
|---|---|---|---|
| 1986 Seoul | China (CHN); Jin Dongxiang; Zhang Qiuping; Zhou Danhong | Japan (JPN); Kyoko Kinoshita; Noriko Kosai; Noriko Ojima | South Korea (KOR); Gu Sun-bok; Kim Young-mi; Lee Hong-ki |
| 1990 Beijing | China (CHN); Xu Yanhua; Zhang Qiuping; Zhou Danhong | Japan (JPN); Noriko Kosai; Yoko Minamoto; Noriko Ojima | South Korea (KOR); Kim Mi-hyang; Kong Hyun-ah; Lee Hye-kyung |
| 1994 Hiroshima | China (CHN); Xu Yanhua; Zhang Qiuping; Zhou Danhong | South Korea (KOR); Cho Eun-young; Kong Hyun-ah; Seo Min-young | Japan (JPN); Junki Enoki; Yoko Minamoto; Noriko Ojima |
| 1998 Bangkok | China (CHN); Shan Hong; Wang Xian; Xu Yimin | Thailand (THA); Jarintorn Dangpiam; Supunnee Khamai; Thanyarat Pupiromchaikul | Uzbekistan (UZB); Alyona Aksyonova; Nataliya Dolbilina; Yuliya Shakhova |
| 2002 Busan | China (CHN); Du Li; Shan Hong; Wang Xian | South Korea (KOR); Kim Jung-mi; Kong Hyun-ah; Lee Sun-min | Kazakhstan (KAZ); Olga Dovgun; Galina Korchma; Varvara Kovalenko |
| 2006 Doha | China (CHN); Liu Bo; Wang Chengyi; Wu Liuxi | South Korea (KOR); Lee Hye-jin; Na Yoon-kyung; Yi Sang-soon | Kazakhstan (KAZ); Olga Dovgun; Galina Korchma; Varvara Kovalenko |
| 2010 Guangzhou | China (CHN); Wang Chengyi; Wu Liuxi; Yi Siling | South Korea (KOR); Kwon Na-ra; Lee Yun-chae; Na Yoon-kyung | Iran (IRI); Elaheh Ahmadi; Mahlagha Jambozorg; Maryam Talebi |
| 2014 Incheon | China (CHN); Chang Jing; Chen Dongqi; Zhao Huixin | South Korea (KOR); Jeong Mi-ra; Kim Seol-a; Yoo Seo-young | Kazakhstan (KAZ); Olga Dovgun; Yelizaveta Lunina; Alexandra Malinovskaya |
| 2022 Hangzhou | China (CHN); Han Jiayu; Xia Siyu; Zhang Qiongyue | India (IND); Ashi Chouksey; Manini Kaushik; Sift Kaur Samra | South Korea (KOR); Bae Sang-hee; Lee Eun-seo; Lee Kye-rim |

=== Running target ===
==== 10 m running target ====
| Games | Gold | Silver | Bronze |
|---|---|---|---|
| 2002 Busan | Xu Xuan (CHN) | Natalya Kovalenko (KAZ) | Wang Xia (CHN) |
| 2006 Doha | Xu Xuan (CHN) | Natalya Gurova (KAZ) | Đặng Hồng Hà (VIE) |
| 2010 Guangzhou | Li Xueyan (CHN) | Su Li (CHN) | Ri Hyang-sim (PRK) |
| 2014 Incheon | Li Xueyan (CHN) | Su Li (CHN) | Nguyễn Thị Thu Hằng (VIE) |
| 2022 Hangzhou | Zukhra Irnazarova (KAZ) | Ri Ji-ye (PRK) | Paek Ok-sim (PRK) |

==== 10 m running target team ====
| Games | Gold | Silver | Bronze |
|---|---|---|---|
| 2002 Busan | China (CHN); Qiu Wei; Wang Xia; Xu Xuan | South Korea (KOR); Kim Deuk-nam; Kim Moon-sun; Park Jung-yun | Iran (IRI); Lida Fariman; Elham Hashemi; Raheleh Kheirollahzadeh |
| 2006 Doha | Kazakhstan (KAZ); Yuliya Berner; Natalya Gurova; Anna Pushkaryova | Vietnam (VIE); Đặng Hồng Hà; Đỗ Thu Trà; Nguyễn Thị Thu Hằng | Qatar (QAT); Anisa Saleh Juma; Samsam Saleh Juma; Amal Mohammed |
| 2010 Guangzhou | China (CHN); Li Xueyan; Su Li; Yang Zeng | Vietnam (VIE); Cù Thị Thanh Tú; Đặng Hồng Hà; Nguyễn Thị Thu Hằng | North Korea (PRK); Jo Hyang; Pak Hyon-a; Ri Hyang-sim |
| 2014 Incheon | China (CHN); Li Xueyan; Su Li; Yang Zeng | Vietnam (VIE); Đặng Hồng Hà; Nguyễn Thị Lệ Quyên; Nguyễn Thị Thu Hằng | Qatar (QAT); Anisa Saleh Juma; Amal Mohammed; Saaida Humaid Taaeeb |
| 2022 Hangzhou | North Korea (PRK); Paek Ok-sim; Pang Myong-hyang; Ri Ji-ye | Kazakhstan (KAZ); Fatima Irnazarova; Zukhra Irnazarova; Alexandra Saduakassova | Indonesia (INA); Rica Nensi Perangin Angin; Feny Bachtiar; Nourma Try Indriani |

=== Shotgun ===
==== Trap ====
| Games | Gold | Silver | Bronze |
|---|---|---|---|
| 1990 Beijing | Wang Yujin (CHN) | Miwako Iwao (JPN) | Ri Hye-gyong (PRK) |
| 2002 Busan | Gao E (CHN) | Pak Yong-hui (PRK) | Ri Hye-gyong (PRK) |
| 2006 Doha | Chen Li (CHN) | Zhu Mei (CHN) | Lin Yi-chun (TPE) |
| 2010 Guangzhou | Yukie Nakayama (JPN) | Gao E (CHN) | Liu Yingzi (CHN) |
| 2014 Incheon | Zhu Jingyu (CHN) | Yukie Nakayama (JPN) | Chattaya Kitcharoen (THA) |
| 2018 Jakarta–Palembang | Zhang Xinqiu (CHN) | Kang Gee-eun (KOR) | Ray Bassil (LBN) |
| 2022 Hangzhou | Zhang Xinqiu (CHN) | Wu Cuicui (CHN) | Mariya Dmitriyenko (KAZ) |

==== Trap team ====
| Games | Gold | Silver | Bronze |
|---|---|---|---|
| 1990 Beijing | China (CHN); Lu Ruizhen; Wang Yujin; Yin Weiping | Japan (JPN); Miwako Iwao; Taeko Miyauchi; Mitsuko Tokoeda | North Korea (PRK); Kim Jong-hui; Pak Yong-hui; Ri Hye-gyong |
| 2002 Busan | North Korea (PRK); Kim Mun-hwa; Pak Yong-hui; Ri Hye-gyong | China (CHN); Gao E Ma Huike; Wang Yujin | Japan (JPN); Yoshie Ishibashi; Yuki Kurisaki; Taeko Takeba |
| 2006 Doha | China (CHN); Chen Li; Wang Yujin; Zhu Mei | North Korea (PRK); Chae Hye-gyong; Kim Yong-bok; Pak Yong-hui | South Korea (KOR); Lee Bo-na; Lee Jung-a; Lee Myung-ae |
| 2010 Guangzhou | China (CHN); Gao E Liu Yingzi; Tian Xia | North Korea (PRK); Chae Hye-gyong; Pak Yong-hui; Yang Sol-i | South Korea (KOR); Eom So-yeon; Kang Gee-eun; Lee Bo-na |
| 2014 Incheon | Kazakhstan (KAZ); Anastassiya Davydova; Mariya Dmitriyenko; Oxana Sereda | China (CHN); Chen Fang; Zhu Jingyu; Zhu Mei | North Korea (PRK); Chae Hye-gyong; Pak Yong-hui; Yang Sol-i |
| 2022 Hangzhou | China (CHN); Li Qingnian; Wu Cuicui; Zhang Xinqiu | India (IND); Manisha Keer; Rajeshwari Kumari; Preeti Rajak | Kazakhstan (KAZ); Mariya Dmitriyenko; Aizhan Dosmagambetova; Anastassiya Prilepina |

==== Double trap ====
| Games | Gold | Silver | Bronze |
|---|---|---|---|
| 1994 Hiroshima | Wang Yujin (CHN) | Gao E (CHN) | Son Hye-kyoung (KOR) |
| 1998 Bangkok | Gao E (CHN) | Lee Sang-hee (KOR) | Vilavan Muneemongkoltorn (THA) |
| 2002 Busan | Lee Sang-hee (KOR) | Wang Jinglin (CHN) | Zhang Yafei (CHN) |
| 2006 Doha | Son Hye-kyoung (KOR) | Janejira Srisongkram (THA) | Lee Bo-na (KOR) |
| 2010 Guangzhou | Li Qingnian (CHN) | Li Rui (CHN) | Janejira Srisongkram (THA) |
| 2014 Incheon | Kim Mi-jin (KOR) | Zhang Yafei (CHN) | Bai Yiting (CHN) |
| 2018 Jakarta–Palembang | Li Qingnian (CHN) | Bai Yiting (CHN) | Mariya Dmitriyenko (KAZ) |

==== Double trap team ====
| Games | Gold | Silver | Bronze |
|---|---|---|---|
| 1998 Bangkok | China (CHN); Ding Hongping; Gao E Zhang Yafei | South Korea (KOR); Lee Eun-sim; Lee Sang-hee; Son Hye-kyoung | Japan (JPN); Yoshiko Kira; Megumi Shirota; Taeko Sogabe |
| 2002 Busan | China (CHN); Ding Hongping; Wang Jinglin; Zhang Yafei | South Korea (KOR); Kim Saet-byeol; Lee Sang-hee; Son Hye-kyoung | Japan (JPN); Yuka Arai; Megumi Inoue; Miyoko Matsushima |
| 2006 Doha | South Korea (KOR); Kim Mi-jin; Lee Bo-na; Son Hye-kyoung | China (CHN); Wang Yujin; Zhang Yafei; Zhu Mei | Thailand (THA); Punnapa Asvanit; Supornpan Chewchalermmit; Janejira Srisongkram |
| 2010 Guangzhou | China (CHN); Li Qingnian; Li Rui; Zhang Yafei | South Korea (KOR); Kang Gee-eun; Kim Mi-jin; Lee Bo-na | Thailand (THA); Punnapa Asvanit; Chattaya Kitcharoen; Janejira Srisongkram |
| 2014 Incheon | China (CHN); Bai Yiting; Zhang Yafei; Zhu Mei | South Korea (KOR); Kim Mi-jin; Lee Bo-na; Son Hye-kyoung | India (IND); Shagun Chowdhary; Shreyasi Singh; Varsha Varman |

==== Skeet ====
| Games | Gold | Silver | Bronze |
|---|---|---|---|
| 1990 Beijing | Zhang Shan (CHN) | Shared gold | Naomi Komaba (JPN) |
| 1990 Beijing | Pak Jong-ran (PRK) | Shared gold | Naomi Komaba (JPN) |
| 2002 Busan | Son Hye-kyoung (KOR) | Shi Hongyan (CHN) | Kim Yeun-hee (KOR) |
| 2006 Doha | Kim Myong-hwa (PRK) | Wei Ning (CHN) | Yu Xiumin (CHN) |
| 2010 Guangzhou | Wei Ning (CHN) | Kim Min-ji (KOR) | Sutiya Jiewchaloemmit (THA) |
| 2014 Incheon | Kim Min-ji (KOR) | Zhang Heng (CHN) | Sutiya Jiewchaloemmit (THA) |
| 2018 Jakarta–Palembang | Sutiya Jiewchaloemmit (THA) | Wei Meng (CHN) | Kim Min-ji (KOR) |
| 2022 Hangzhou | Jiang Yiting (CHN) | Gao Jinmei (CHN) | Assem Orynbay (KAZ) |

==== Skeet team ====
| Games | Gold | Silver | Bronze |
|---|---|---|---|
| 1990 Beijing | China (CHN); Shao Weiping; Wu Lanying; Zhang Shan | North Korea (PRK); Kim Myong-hwa; Pak Jong-ran; Ri Hyon-ok | Japan (JPN); Yumiko Hosoya; Naomi Komaba; Sachiko Ogawa |
| 2002 Busan | South Korea (KOR); Kim Yeun-hee; Kwak Yu-hyun; Son Hye-kyoung | China (CHN); Chen Zhenru; Shi Hongyan; Wei Ning | Chinese Taipei (TPE); Chou Tsai-jung; Hsieh Ming-yi; Huang Shih-ting |
| 2006 Doha | China (CHN); Wei Ning; Yu Xiumin; Zhang Donglian | North Korea (PRK); Kim Myong-hwa; Pak Jong-ran; Pak Kum-hui | South Korea (KOR); Kim Yeun-hee; Kwak Yu-hyun; Son Hye-kyoung |
| 2010 Guangzhou | China (CHN); Wei Meng; Wei Ning; Zhang Shan | South Korea (KOR); Kim Ae-kyun; Kim Min-ji; Kwak Yu-hyun | Thailand (THA); Isarapa Imprasertsuk; Sutiya Jiewchaloemmit; Nutchaya Sutarporn |
| 2014 Incheon | China (CHN); Li Bowen; Lin Piaopiao; Zhang Heng | South Korea (KOR); Kim Min-ji; Kwak Yu-hyun; Son Hye-kyoung | Thailand (THA); Isarapa Imprasertsuk; Sutiya Jiewchaloemmit; Nutchaya Sutarporn |
| 2022 Hangzhou | Kazakhstan (KAZ); Zoya Kravchenko; Assem Orynbay; Olga Panarina | China (CHN); Gao Jinmei; Huang Sixue; Jiang Yiting | Thailand (THA); Isarapa Imprasertsuk; Sutiya Jiewchaloemmit; Nutchaya Sutarporn |

== Mixed ==
=== Pistol ===
==== 10 m air pistol team ====
| Games | Gold | Silver | Bronze |
|---|---|---|---|
| 2018 Jakarta–Palembang | China (CHN); Wu Jiayu; Ji Xiaojing | South Korea (KOR); Lee Dae-myung; Kim Min-jung | Vietnam (VIE); Trần Quốc Cường; Lê Thị Linh Chi |
| 2022 Hangzhou | China (CHN); Zhang Bowen; Jiang Ranxin | India (IND); Sarabjot Singh; Divya T. S. | Iran (IRI); Amir Joharikhoo; Hanieh Rostamian |
| 2022 Hangzhou | China (CHN); Zhang Bowen; Jiang Ranxin | India (IND); Sarabjot Singh; Divya T. S. | South Korea (KOR); Lee Won-ho; Kim Bo-mi |

=== Rifle ===
==== 10 m air rifle team ====
| Games | Gold | Silver | Bronze |
|---|---|---|---|
| 2018 Jakarta–Palembang | Chinese Taipei (TPE); Lu Shao-chuan; Lin Ying-shin | China (CHN); Yang Haoran; Zhao Ruozhu | India (IND); Ravi Kumar; Apurvi Chandela |
| 2022 Hangzhou | China (CHN); Sheng Lihao; Huang Yuting | Uzbekistan (UZB); Javokhir Sokhibov; Mukhtasar Tokhirova | Kazakhstan (KAZ); Islam Satpayev; Alexandra Le |
| 2022 Hangzhou | China (CHN); Sheng Lihao; Huang Yuting | Uzbekistan (UZB); Javokhir Sokhibov; Mukhtasar Tokhirova | South Korea (KOR); Park Ha-jun; Lee Eun-seo |

=== Shotgun ===
==== Trap team ====
| Games | Gold | Silver | Bronze |
|---|---|---|---|
| 2018 Jakarta–Palembang | Lebanon (LBN); Alain Moussa; Ray Bassil | Chinese Taipei (TPE); Yang Kun-pi; Lin Yi-chun | China (CHN); Du Yu; Wang Xiaojing |

==== Skeet team ====
| Games | Gold | Silver | Bronze |
|---|---|---|---|
| 2022 Hangzhou | Kazakhstan (KAZ); Eduard Yechshenko; Assem Orynbay | Kuwait (KUW); Abdullah Al-Rashidi; Eman Al-Shamaa | China (CHN); Liu Jiangchi; Jiang Yiting |
| 2022 Hangzhou | Kazakhstan (KAZ); Eduard Yechshenko; Assem Orynbay | Kuwait (KUW); Abdullah Al-Rashidi; Eman Al-Shamaa | Qatar (QAT); Rashid Saleh Al-Athba; Reem Al-Sharshani |
