= Shooting at the 2002 Asian Games – Women's double trap =

Women's double trap at the 2002 Asian Games
- Venue: Changwon International Shooting Range
- Dates: 5 October 2002
- Competitors: 13 from 5 nations

Medalists
gold medal	Lee Sang-hee	South Korea
silver medal	Wang Jinglin	China
bronze medal	Zhang Yafei	China

The women's double trap competition at the 2002 Asian Games in Busan, South Korea was held on 5 October at the Changwon International Shooting Range.

== Schedule ==
All times are Korea Standard Time (UTC+09:00)

Date	Time	Event
Saturday, 5 October 2002	09:30	Qualification
Saturday, 5 October 2002	15:00	Final

== Records ==
Prior to this competition, the existing world, Asian and Games records were as follows.

Qualification
World Record	Zhang Yafei (CHN)	115	Nicosia, Cyprus	20 October 2000
Asian Record	Zhang Yafei (CHN)	115	Nicosia, Cyprus	20 October 2000
Games Record	Wang Yujin (CHN)	112	Hiroshima, Japan	10 October 1994
Final
World Record	Zhang Yafei (CHN)	150	Nicosia, Cyprus	20 October 2000
Asian Record	Zhang Yafei (CHN)	150	Nicosia, Cyprus	20 October 2000
Games Record	Wang Yujin (CHN)	148	Hiroshima, Japan	10 October 1994

== Results ==
=== Qualification ===
Rank	Athlete	Round			Total	S-off	Notes
Rank	Athlete	1	2	3	Total	S-off	Notes
1	Lee Sang-hee (KOR)	38	37	36	111		
2	Zhang Yafei (CHN)	34	37	38	109		
3	Megumi Inoue (JPN)	35	38	36	109		
4	Ding Hongping (CHN)	36	33	39	108		
5	Wang Jinglin (CHN)	38	31	39	108		
6	Son Hye-kyoung (KOR)	37	33	37	107		
7	Yuka Arai (JPN)	38	33	35	106		
8	Lin Yi-chun (TPE)	33	38	34	105		
9	Kim Saet-byeol (KOR)	32	31	38	101		
10	Miyoko Matsushima (JPN)	28	34	35	97		
11	Wen Kai-lu (TPE)	33	32	30	95		
12	Bangorn Chewchalermmit (THA)	31	30	28	89		
13	Wu Meng-ying (TPE)	26	37	23	86		

=== Final ===
Rank	Athlete	Qual.	Final	Total	S-off	Notes
1st place, gold medalist(s)	Lee Sang-hee (KOR)	111	34	145		
2nd place, silver medalist(s)	Wang Jinglin (CHN)	108	36	144		
3rd place, bronze medalist(s)	Zhang Yafei (CHN)	109	32	141		
4	Ding Hongping (CHN)	108	32	140		
5	Megumi Inoue (JPN)	109	29	138		
6	Son Hye-kyoung (KOR)	107	30	137		
