= Hye-kyung =

- Hangul: 혜경
- RR: Hyegyeong
- MR: Hyegyŏng

Hye-kyung, also spelled Hye-kyong, is a Korean given name.

People with this name include:

== Sportspeople ==
- Lee Hye-kyung (born 1963), South Korean sport shooter
- Won Hye-kyung (born 1979), South Korean short track speed skater
- Kim Hye-gyong (born 1993), North Korean long-distance runner

== Entertainers ==
- Cheeze (singer) (born Im Hye-kyung, 1991), South Korean singer

== Other ==
- Lady Hyegyeong (1735–1816), Korean writer and Crown Princess during the Joseon period
- Lee Hye-gyeong (born 1960), South Korean writer
- Hai-Kyung Suh (born 1960), South Korean classical pianist

== See also ==
- List of Korean given names
