= Kim Hye-yeong =

Kim Hye-yeong may refer to:

- Kim Hye-yeong (footballer)
- Kim Hye-yeong (sport shooter)
