= Katsumasa =

- Gender: Male

Origin
- Origin: Japanese
- Meaning: Different meanings depending on the kanji used

Katsumasa (written: 勝政, 勝正, 勝昌 or 克昌) is a masculine Japanese given name. Notable people with the name include:

- Ikeda Katsumasa (池田 勝正; 1539–1578), Japanese daimyō
- Itakura Katsumasa (板倉 勝政; 1759–1821), Japanese daimyō
- Kasugaō Katsumasa (春日王 克昌; born 1977), Japanese sumo wrestler
- Katsumasa Miyamoto (宮本 勝昌; born 1972), Japanese golfer
- Katsumasa Onishi (大西 克昌; born 1959), Japanese sport shooter
- Katsumasa Suzuki (鈴木 克昌; born 1943), Japanese politician
