= Bang Hyun-joo =

South Korean sport shooter (born 1966)

Personal information
- Born: 17 July 1966 (age 58)

Korean name
- Hangul: 방현주
- Hanja: 方賢珠
- RR: Bang Hyeonju
- MR: Pang Hyŏnju

Sport
- Sport: Shooting sport

Bang Hyun-joo (born 17 July 1966) is a South Korean sport shooter who competed in the 1988 Summer Olympics and in the 1992 Summer Olympics.

Bang graduated from Sinmyeong Girls High School (Note: Korean: 신명여자고등학교; Hanja: 信明女子高等學校) in Daegu in 1985, and then joined the South Korean national shooting team in early 1986. In domestic competition, she represented Kookmin Bank team. She was part of the women's 10m air pistol team which set the new South Korean national record at the 2nd Chairman's Flag National Shooting Championships (Note: Korean: 회장기 전국사격대회; Hanja: 會長旗全國射擊大會) in May 1986 with a score of 1129, which was the Kookmin Bank team's first national record. Later that year in shooting at the 1986 Asian Games, she won bronze in the women's individual 10m air pistol. In 1987 her team again set a new South Korean national record in women's team 10m air pistol at the 3rd Chairman's Flag National Shooting Championships with a score of 1135. At the 1990 UIT World Cups, in Mexico City she won gold in the women's team air pistol event along with teammates Hong Young-ok and Lee Sun-bok, and then in Los Angeles a silver in the women's individual air pistol.
