= Kim Yong-bae =

Kim Yong-bae may refer to:

- Kim Yong-bae (field hockey)
- Kim Yong-bae (sport shooter)
