= Ōhata =

Ōhata, Ohata or Oohata (written: 大畑 or 大畠) is a Japanese surname. Notable people with the surname include:

- Ayumu Ōhata (born 2001), Japanese footballer
- Akihiro Ohata (大畠 章宏; born 1947), Japanese politician
- Allan M. Ohata (1918–1977), United States Army soldier and Medal of Honor recipient
- Daisuke Ohata (大畑 大介; born 1975), Japanese rugby union player
- Koichi Ohata (大畑 晃一; born 1962), Japanese anime mecha designer, storyboard artist and director
- Mariana Ohata (born 1978), Brazilian triathlete
- Masanobu Ohata (大畑 政修; born 1947), Japanese sport shooter
- Misaki Ohata (大畠 美咲; born 1989), Japanese professional wrestler
- Takahiro Ohata (大畑 孝広; born 1957), Japanese handball player
