= An Jae-song =

South Korean sport shooter (born 1936)

Personal information
- Born: 3 May 1936 Anju, Heian'nan Province, Korea, Empire of Japan
- Died: 26 October 1979 (aged 43) Seoul, South Korea
- Height: 161 cm (5 ft 3 in)
- Weight: 63 kg (139 lb)

Sport
- Sport: Sports shooting
- College team: Dong-a University
- Team: ROK Marine Corps
Medal record
Representing South Korea
Men's shooting
Asian Games
Gold medal – first place	1966 Bangkok	25 m center-fire pistol team
Gold medal – first place	1966 Bangkok	50 m free pistol team

Korean name
- Hangul: 안재송
- Hanja: 安載松
- RR: An Jaesong
- MR: An Chaesong

An Jae-song (Korean: 안재송; 3 May 1934 – 26 October 1979) was a South Korean sports shooter.

He became two times Asian Games champion at the 1966 Asian Games in Bangkok, in the 25 m center-fire pistol team and 50 m free pistol team events.

He also competed at other international competitions, including three times at the Summer Olympics. He participated at the 1960, 1964 and 1968 Summer Olympics with his best Olympic result being ninth place in the men's 50 metre pistol event at the 1964 Tokyo Olympics.

Working as a bodyguard, he was killed during the assassination of South Korean President Park Chung Hee in Seoul on 26 October 1979.
