= Kang Hye-ja =

South Korean sport shooter

- Hangul: 강혜자
- Hanja: 康惠子
- RR: Gang Hyeja
- MR: Kang Hyeja

Kang Hye-ja (Korean: 강혜자; born 4 July 1966) is a South Korean sport shooter. She was born in Jeju Province. She won a gold medal in the women's 10 metre air rifle team event in shooting at the 1986 Asian Games along with teammates Lee Hong-ki (이홍기; 李弘基) and Park Jeong-a. She later competed in the 1988 Summer Olympics.
