= Suh Kang-wook =

South Korean sports shooter

Personal information
- Born: 26 March 1929 Hapcheon, South Gyeongsang
- Education: Chinju National University of Education

Sport
- Sport: Sports shooting
- Team: ROK Army

Korean name
- Hangul: 서강욱
- Hanja: 徐康旭
- RR: Seo Ganguk
- MR: Sŏ Kanguk

Suh Kang-wook (born 26 March 1929) is a South Korean former sports shooter. He competed in the 50 metre pistol event at the 1964 Summer Olympics.
