= Yoon Deok-ha =

South Korean sports shooter

Personal information
- Nationality: South Korean
- Born: 10 October 1954 (age 70)

Sport
- Sport: Sports shooting

Yoon Deok-ha (born 10 October 1954) is a South Korean sports shooter. He competed in three events at the 1984 Summer Olympics.
