= So Gil-san =

North Korean sports shooter

Personal information
- Native name: 서길산
- Nationality: North Korean
- Born: 17 April 1954 (age 71)

Sport
- Sport: Sports shooting

So Gil-san (born 17 April 1954) is a North Korean sports shooter. He competed at the 1976 Summer Olympics, the 1980 Summer Olympics and the 1992 Summer Olympics.
