= Shu Qingquan =

Chinese sports shooter

Shu Qingquan (born 30 March 1967) is a Chinese sport shooter who competed in the 1992 Summer Olympics.
