= Takao Ishii =

Japanese sport shooter (born 1941)

Personal information
- Born: 石井孝郎 (Ishii Takao); 1 February 1941 (age 85) Ibaraki Prefecture, Japan

Sport
- Sport: Sports shooting

Takao Ishii (born 1 February 1941) is a Japanese sport shooter who competed in the 1960 Summer Olympics and in the 1964 Summer Olympics.
