= Michiharu Ozaki =

Japanese sport shooter

Personal information
- Nationality: Japanese
- Born: 28 March 1953 (age 72)

Sport
- Sport: Sports shooting

Michiharu Ozaki (尾崎 道治, Ozaki Michiharu; born 28 March 1953) is a Japanese sports shooter. He competed in the men's 50 metre rifle three positions event at the 1976 Summer Olympics.
