= Xu Yanhua =

Chinese sport shooter

Xu Yanhua (born 12 December 1970) is a Chinese sport shooter who competed in the 1992 Summer Olympics and in the 1996 Summer Olympics.
