= Kim Man-chol =

North Korean sports shooter (born 1972)

Kim Man-chol (Korean: 김만철, born 11 February 1972) is a North Korean sport shooter who competed in the 1992 Summer Olympics and in the 1996 Summer Olympics.
