= Min Young-sam =

South Korean sport shooter

Min Young-sam (born 30 March 1954) is a South Korean sport shooter who competed in the 1988 Summer Olympics.
