= Zhang Xindong =

Chinese sport shooter (born 1969)

Zhang Xindong (born 6 February 1969) is a Chinese sport shooter who competed in the 1992 Summer Olympics and in the 1996 Summer Olympics.
