= Boo Soon-hee =

South Korean sport shooter (born 1967)

- Hangul: 부순희
- Hanja: 夫順姬
- RR: Bu Sunhui
- MR: Pu Sunhŭi

Boo Soon-hee (born 15 July 1967) is a South Korean sport shooter who competed in the 1988 Summer Olympics, in the 1996 Summer Olympics, and in the 2000 Summer Olympics.

== Personal life ==
Boo was raised in Jeju Province. She married office worker Choe Jae-seok in October 1992. The couple have one son, born in 1995.
