= Chon Un-ju =

North Korean sport shooter

Personal information
- Nationality: North Korean
- Born: 8 April 1970 (age 55); North Korea

Sport
- Sport: Sports shooting

Chon Un-ju (Korean: 전은주; born on 8 April 1970) is a North Korean sport shooter. She competed in rifle shooting events at the 1992 Summer Olympics.

== Olympic results ==
Event	1992
50 metre rifle three positions (women)	36th
