= Sin Nam-ho =

North Korean sports shooter

Sin Nam-ho(신남호) (born 2 January 1960) is a North Korean sport shooter who competed in the 1992 Summer Olympics.
