= Lim Dong-ki =

South Korean sport shooter

Personal information
- Nationality: South Korean
- Born: 1 August 1959 (age 65)

Sport
- Sport: Sports shooting

Lim Dong-ki (born 1 August 1959) is a South Korean sport shooter who competed in the 1984 Summer Olympics.
