= Li Dan (sport shooter) =

Chinese sport shooter

Li Dan (Chinese: 李丹; pinyin: Lǐ Dān; born 13 February 1962) is a Chinese sport shooter who competed in the 1988 Summer Olympics.
