= Yang Chung-yul =

South Korean sport shooter

Yang Chung-yul (born 28 February 1953) is a South Korean sport shooter who competed in the 1984 Summer Olympics and in the 1988 Summer Olympics.
