= Li Zhongqi =

Chinese sports shooter (born 1957)

Li Zhongqi (born 28 December 1957) is a Chinese sport shooter who competed in the 1984 Summer Olympics and in the 1988 Summer Olympics.
