= Zhu Changfu =

Chinese sports shooter (born 1954)

Personal information
- Nationality: Chinese
- Born: 3 April 1954 (age 71)

Sport
- Sport: Sports shooting

Zhu Changfu (born 3 April 1954) is a Chinese sports shooter. He competed in the mixed skeet event at the 1984 Summer Olympics.
