= Kim Young-jin (sport shooter) =

South Korean sports shooter (born 1995)

Personal information
- Nationality: South Korean
- Born: 6 September 1955 (age 70)

Sport
- Sport: Sports shooting

Kim Young-jin (born 6 September 1955) is one of the South Korean sports shooters. He competed in the mixed skeet event at the 1984 Summer Olympics.
