= Zhang Ronghui =

Chinese sports shooter (born 1970)

Zhang Ronghui (born 25 August 1970) is a Chinese sport shooter who competed in the 1992 Summer Olympics.
