= Jin Dongxiang =

Chinese sport shooter

Jin Dongxiang (born 30 May 1957) is a Chinese sport shooter who competed in the 1984 Summer Olympics.
