= Ning Lijia =

Chinese sport shooter (born 1965)

Ning Lijia (Chinese: 宁立佳; born 5 June 1965) is a Chinese sport shooter who competed in the 1996 Summer Olympics and in the 2000 Summer Olympics.
