= Lee Mi-kyung (sport shooter) =

South Korean sport shooter

- Hangul: 이미경
- RR: I Migyeong
- MR: I Migyŏng

Lee Mi-kyung (born 27 March 1969) is a South Korean sport shooter who competed in the 1988 Summer Olympics.
