= Damrong Pachonyut =

Thai sports shooter (born 1932)

Personal information
- Born: 23 September 1932 (age 93)

Sport
- Sport: Sports shooting

Damrong Pachonyut (born 23 September 1932) is a Thai former sports shooter. He competed at the 1972, 1976 and the 1984 Summer Olympics.
