= Kang Myong-a =

South Korean sports shooter

Gang Myeong-a
Personal information
- Nationality: South Korean
- Born: 30 March 1972 (age 53) South Korea

Sport
- Sport: Sports shooting

Kang Myong-a (born 30 March 1972) is a South Korean sport shooter. She competed in rifle shooting events at the 1992 Summer Olympics.

== Olympic results ==
Event	1992
50 metre rifle three positions (women)	T-24th
