= Lim Jang-soo =

South Korean sport shooter

Lim Jang-soo (born 10 October 1959) is a South Korean sport shooter who competed in the 1988 Summer Olympics.

He also won several medals at the Asian Games.
