= Samarn Jongsuk =

Thai sports shooter (born 1951)

Personal information
- Nationality: Thai
- Born: 24 March 1951 (age 74)

Sport
- Sport: Sports shooting

Samarn Jongsuk (born 24 March 1951) is a Thai sports shooter. He competed in the men's 10 metre air rifle event at the 1992 Summer Olympics.
