= Lee Eun-ju (sport shooter) =

South Korean sport shooter

- Hangul: 이은주
- Hanja: 李恩珠
- RR: I Eunju
- MR: I Ŭnju

Lee Eun-ju (born 27 April 1970) is a South Korean sport shooter who competed in the 1992 Summer Olympics.
