= Jiang Rong (sport shooter) =

Chinese sport shooter (born 1961)

Jiang Rong (born 27 May 1961) is a Chinese sport shooter who competed in the 1984 Summer Olympics, in the 1988 Summer Olympics, and in the 1992 Summer Olympics.
