= Kim Gi-jong =

North Korean sports shooter (born 1955)

Personal information
- Nationality: North Korean
- Born: 10 November 1955 (age 69)

Sport
- Sport: Sports shooting

Kim Gi-jong (born 10 November 1955) is a North Korean sports shooter. He competed in the mixed 50 metre free pistol event at the 1980 Summer Olympics.
