= Kim Dong-gil (sport shooter) =

North Korean sports shooter (born 1956)

Personal information
- Nationality: North Korean
- Born: 4 July 1956 (age 69)

Sport
- Sport: Sports shooting

Kim Dong-gil (born 4 July 1956) is a North Korean sports shooter. He competed in the mixed 50 metre rifle three positions event at the 1980 Summer Olympics.
