= Jitsuka Matsuoka =

Japanese sport shooter

Jitsuka Matsuoka (松岡 実和, Matsuoka Jitsuka; born 26 October 1933) is a Japanese sport shooter who competed in the 1976 Summer Olympics.
