= Makoto Shiraishi =

Japanese sport shooter

Personal information
- Born: 6 February 1940 (age 86) Fukuoka, Japan

Sport
- Sport: Sports shooting

Makoto Shiraishi (白石 洵, Shiraishi Makoto; born 6 February 1940) is a Japanese sport shooter who competed in the 1968 Summer Olympics.
