= Solos Nalampoon =

Thai sports shooter (born 1938)

Personal information
- Born: 2 July 1938 (age 88)

Sport
- Sport: Sports shooting

Solos Nalampoon (born 2 July 1938) is a Thai former sports shooter. He competed at the 1972 Summer Olympics and the 1976 Summer Olympics.
