= Nguyễn Quốc Cường (sport shooter) =

Vietnamese sports shooter

Personal information
- Nationality: Vietnamese
- Born: 28 October 1949 (age 75)

Sport
- Sport: Sports shooting

Nguyễn Quốc Cường (born 28 October 1949) is a Vietnamese sports shooter. He competed at the 1980 Summer Olympics, the 1988 Summer Olympics and the 1992 Summer Olympics.
