= Byun Kyung-soo =

South Korean sport shooter

Byun Kyung-soo (born 13 April 1958) is a South Korean sport shooter who competed in the 1988 Summer Olympics.
