= Ji Gang =

Chinese sports shooter (born 1969)

Ji Gang (born 9 February 1969) is a Chinese sport shooter who competed in the 1988 Summer Olympics.
