= Shigemi Saito =

Japanese sport shooter (born 1937)

Personal information
- Born: 25 February 1937 (age 88); Yamaguchi, Japan

Sport
- Sport: Sports shooting

Shigemi Saito (斎藤 繁美, Saitō Shigemi; born 25 February 1937) is a Japanese former sports shooter. He competed at the 1964 Summer Olympics and the 1968 Summer Olympics. He also competed at the 1966 Asian Games and won four gold medals in team events.
