= Park Chul-sung =

South Korean sport shooter

Park Chul-sung (born 21 November 1955) is a South Korean sport shooter who competed in the 1984 Summer Olympics, in the 1988 Summer Olympics and in the 1996 Summer Olympics.
