= Amorn Yuktanandana =

Thai sports shooter (1928–2015)

Personal information
- Born: 16 June 1928 Nakorn Dhamm, Thailand
- Died: 10 October 2015 (aged 87)

Sport
- Sport: Sports shooting

Amorn Yuktanan formerly known as Amorn Yuktanandana (16 June 1928 – 10 October 2015) was a Thai sports shooter. He competed at the 1960, 1964, 1968 Summer Olympics and 1958 and 1966 Asian Games.
