= Akihiro Mera =

Japanese sport shooter

Akihiro Mera (目良明裕, Mera Akihiro, born 6 November 1967) is a Japanese sport shooter who competed in the 1988 Summer Olympics and in the 1992 Summer Olympics.

He also won several medals at the Asian Games.
