= Park Jong-kil =

South Korean sport shooter

Park Jong-kil (born 10 May 1946) is a South Korean sport shooter who competed in the 1976 Summer Olympics and in the 1984 Summer Olympics.
