= Hiroyuki Nakajo =

Japanese sports shooter (1946–2020)

Personal information
- Nationality: Japanese
- Born: 2 February 1946
- Died: 19 April 2020 (aged 74)

Sport
- Sport: Sports shooting

Hiroyuki Nakajo (中條 公行, Nakajō Hiroyuki; 2 February 1946 – 19 April 2020) was a Japanese sports shooter. He competed in the men's 50 metre rifle, prone event at the 1984 Summer Olympics.
