= Kim Yun-sob =

North Korean sports shooter (born 1956)

Personal information
- Native name: 김준섭
- Nationality: North Korean
- Born: 5 June 1956 (age 69)

Sport
- Sport: Sports shooting

Kim Yun-sob (born 5 June 1956) is a North Korean sports shooter. He competed in the mixed 50 metre rifle prone event at the 1980 Summer Olympics.
