= Paek Jong-suk =

North Korean sports shooter

Personal information
- Nationality: North Korean
- Born: 9 January 1962 (age 63)

Sport
- Sport: Sports shooting

Paek Jong-suk (born 9 January 1962) is a North Korean sports shooter. She competed in the women's 25 metre pistol event at the 1992 Summer Olympics.
