= Tomoya Yamashita =

Japanese sports shooter

Tomoya Yamashita (山下 友也, Yamashita Tomoya; born 21 July 1946) is a Japanese sport shooter who competed in the 1988 Summer Olympics.
