= Cho Eun-young =

South Korean sport shooter (born 1972)

Personal information
- Nationality: South Korean
- Born: 4 June 1972 (age 53)

Sport
- Country: South Korea
- Sport: Shooting

Korean name
- Hangul: 조은영
- RR: Jo Eunyeong
- MR: Cho Ŭnyŏng

Cho Eun-young (born 4 June 1972) is a South Korean sport shooter who competed in the 2004 Summer Olympics.
