= Wang Zhonghua =

Chinese sport shooter (born 1965)

Wang Zhonghua (born 14 April 1965) is a Chinese sport shooter who competed in the 1988 Summer Olympics and in the 1992 Summer Olympics.
