= Veera Uppapong =

Thai sports shooter (born 1940)

Personal information
- Nationality: Thai
- Born: 24 December 1940 (age 84)

Sport
- Sport: Sports shooting

Veera Uppapong (born 24 December 1940) is a Thai sports shooter. He competed in the men's 50 metre free pistol event at the 1976 Summer Olympics.
