= Zhou Danhong =

Chinese sport shooter

- Born: October 17, 1967 (age 58)
- Occupation: Sport shooter
- Known for: Competing at 1988 Summer Olympics; Competing at 1992 Summer Olympics

Zhou Danhong (born 17 October 1967) is a Chinese sport shooter who competed in the 1988 Summer Olympics and in the 1992 Summer Olympics.
