= Zhang Qiuping =

Chinese sport shooter

Zhang Qiuping (born 18 September 1963) is a Chinese sport shooter who competed in the 1988 Summer Olympics, in the 1992 Summer Olympics, and in the 1996 Summer Olympics.

She is married to sport shooter Wang Yifu.
