= Kyoko Kinoshita =

Japanese sport shooter

Kyoko Kinoshita (木下亨子, Kinoshita Kyōko, born 12 January 1963) is a Japanese sport shooter who competed in the 1988 Summer Olympics.
