= Hong Seung-pyo =

South Korean sport shooter

Hong Seung-pyo (born 6 September 1962) is a South Korean sport shooter who competed in the 1988 Summer Olympics.
