= Wen Zhifang =

Chinese sport shooter

Wen Zhifang (born 25 September 1960) is a Chinese sport shooter who competed in the 1984 Summer Olympics and in the 1988 Summer Olympics.
