= Choi Chung-seok =

South Korean sport shooter

Personal information
- Born: 3 April 1940 (age 85)

Sport
- Sport: Sports shooting

Choi Chung-seok (born 3 April 1940) is a South Korean former sports shooter. He competed at the 1972 Summer Olympics and the 1976 Summer Olympics.
