= Zhang Weigang =

Chinese sport shooter (born 1961)

Zhang Weigang (born 16 July 1961) is a Chinese sport shooter who competed in the 1988 Summer Olympics.

His height and weight are 176 cm and 73 kg, respectively.
