= Kanji Kubo =

Japanese sport shooter

Personal information
- Born: 7 June 1938 (age 88)

Sport
- Sport: Sports shooting

Kanji Kubo (久保 皖司, Kubo Kanji; born 7 June 1938) is a Japanese sport shooter who competed in the 1964 Summer Olympics, in the 1972 Summer Olympics, and in the 1976 Summer Olympics.
