= Noriko Kosai =

Japanese sport shooter

Noriko Kosai (香西 式子, Kōsai Noriko; born 28 November 1955) is a Japanese sport shooter who competed in the 1984 Summer Olympics and in the 1992 Summer Olympics.
