= Hideo Nonaka =

Japanese sport shooter

Hideo Nonaka (野中英夫 (Nonaka Hideo) born 30 June 1956) is a Japanese sport shooter who competed in the 1988 Summer Olympics. He was a law enforcement officer at the Osaka Prefectural Police.
