= Cai Yeqing =

Chinese sport shooter

Cai Yeqing (born May 23, 1971) is a Chinese sport shooter. She competed at the 2000 Summer Olympics in the women's 25 metre pistol event, in which she placed eighth.
