= Noriyuki Nishitani =

Japanese sport shooter

Noriyuki Nishitani (born 11 February 1965) is a Japanese sport shooter who competed in the 2000 Summer Olympics.
