= Du Xuean =

Chinese sports shooter (born 1956)

Personal information
- Nationality: Chinese
- Born: 3 July 1956 (age 70)

Sport
- Sport: Sports shooting

Du Xuean (born 3 July 1956) is a Chinese sports shooter. He competed in the men's 25 metre rapid fire pistol event at the 1984 Summer Olympics.
