= Choji Hosaka =

Japanese sport shooter (born 1920)

Personal information
- Born: 保坂調司 (Hosaka Chōji); 24 November 1920

Sport
- Sport: Sports shooting

Choji Hosaka (born 24 November 1920) was a Japanese sport shooter who competed in the 1956 Summer Olympics.

He belonged to the Tokyo Metropolitan Police Department, and during the Asama-Sansō incident, he acted as the leader of the sniper team and made a contribution to neutralize the criminal's sniper rifle by warning shots of his pistol.
