= Qi Chunxia =

Chinese sport shooter (born 1964)

Qi Chunxia (born 5 February 1964) is a Chinese sport shooter who competed in the 1988 Summer Olympics.
