= Kim Gyong-ho =

North Korean sports shooter (born 1955)

Personal information
- Nationality: North Korean
- Born: 19 January 1955 (age 70)

Sport
- Sport: Sports shooting

Kim Gyong-ho (born 19 January 1955) is a North Korean sports shooter. He competed at the 1976 Summer Olympics and the 1980 Summer Olympics.
