= Fumihisa Semizuki =

Japanese sport shooter

Fumihisa Semizuki (勢見月 文久, Semizuki Fumihisa; born 11 August 1949) is a Japanese sport shooter who competed in the 1988 Summer Olympics and in the 1992 Summer Olympics.
