= Wu Lanying =

Chinese sport shooter (born 1955)

Wu Lanying (born 26 October 1955) is a Chinese sport shooter who competed in the 1984 Summer Olympics and in the 1988 Summer Olympics.
