= Vladimir Guchsha =

Kazakhstani sports shooter (born 1967)

Vladimir Guchsha (Владимир Иосифович Гуща, May 18, 1967 — 3 June 2006, in Pavlodar, Kazakh SSR, Soviet Union) is a Kazakhstani sport shooter. He competed at the 2000 Summer Olympics in the men's 50 metre pistol event, in which he placed eighth, and the men's 10 metre air pistol event, in which he tied for 23rd place.
