= Ko Young-hee (sport shooter) =

South Korean sports shooter

Personal information
- Nationality: South Korean
- Born: 23 March 1956 (age 69)

Sport
- Sport: Sports shooting

Ko Young-hee (born 23 March 1956) is a South Korean sports shooter. She competed in the women's 50 metre rifle three positions event at the 1984 Summer Olympics.
