= Sutham Aswanit =

Thai sports shooter (born 1932)

Personal information
- Nationality: Thai
- Born: 23 March 1932 (age 94)

Sport
- Sport: Sports shooting

Sutham Aswanit (born 23 March 1932) is a Thai former sports shooter. He competed at the 1968, 1972 and 1976 Summer Olympics. He also competed at the 1970 and 1974 Asian Games.
