= Zhang Yingzhou =

Chinese sport shooter (born 1962)

Zhang Yingzhou (born 5 March 1962) is a Chinese sport shooter who competed in the 1988 Summer Olympics and in the 1992 Summer Olympics.

He also won several medals at the Asian Games.
