= Peera Piromratna =

Thai sports shooter (born 1958)

Personal information
- Nationality: Thai
- Born: 1 April 1958 (age 68)

Sport
- Sport: Sports shooting

Peera Piromratna (born 1 April 1958) is a Thai sports shooter. He competed in the men's 25 metre rapid fire pistol event at the 1984 Summer Olympics.
