= Taweesak Kasiwat =

Thai sports shooter (born 1932)

Personal information
- Born: 10 August 1932 (age 93) Samut Prakan, Thailand

Sport
- Sport: Sports shooting

Taweesak Kasiwat (born 10 August 1932) is a Thai former sports shooter. He competed at the 1964 Summer Olympics and the 1968 Summer Olympics.
