= Kaoru Matsuo =

Japanese sport shooter

Kaoru Matsuo (松尾 薫, Matsuo Kaoru; born 9 July 1951) is a Japanese sport shooter who competed in the 1976 Summer Olympics, in the 1984 Summer Olympics, and in the 1988 Summer Olympics.
