= Shigetoshi Tashiro =

Japanese sport shooter

Personal information
- Born: 10 January 1939 (age 87)

Sport
- Sport: Sports shooting

Shigetoshi Tashiro (田代 繁俊, Tashiro Shigetoshi; born 10 January 1939) is a Japanese sport shooter who competed in the 1972 Summer Olympics, in the 1976 Summer Olympics and in the 1984 Summer Olympics.
