= Chikafumi Hirai =

Japanese sports shooter (born 1951)

Chikafumi Hirai (平井親文 (Hirai Chikafumi) was born 20 December 1951. He is a Japanese competition sport shooter. He competed in the 1984 Summer Olympics.
