= Sachio Hosokawa =

Japanese sports shooter (born 1940)

Personal information
- Nationality: Japanese
- Born: 12 May 1940 (age 85)

Sport
- Sport: Sports shooting

Sachio Hosokawa (細川幸雄, Hosokawa Sachio; born 12 May 1940) is a Japanese sports shooter. He competed in the men's 50 metre rifle, prone event at the 1976 Summer Olympics.
