= Park Nam-kyu =

South Korean sports shooter

Personal information
- Born: 9 October 1936 (age 89) Namhae, South Gyeongsang
- Education: Namhae Jeil High School; Korea Naval Academy

Sport
- Sport: Sports shooting
- Team: ROK Marine Corps

Korean name
- Hangul: 박남규
- Hanja: 朴南奎
- RR: Bak Namgyu
- MR: Pak Namgyu

Park Nam-kyu (born 9 October 1936) is a South Korean former sports shooter. He competed in the 25 metre pistol event at the 1964 Summer Olympics.
