= Kwon Taek-yul =

South Korean sport shooter

Kwon Taek-yul (born 27 November 1957) is a South Korean sport shooter who competed in the 1988 Summer Olympics.
