= Sangidorjiin Adilbish =

Mongolian sports shooter (born 1954)

Personal information
- Nationality: Mongolian
- Born: 20 December 1954 (age 70)

Sport
- Sport: Sports shooting

Sangidorjiin Adilbish (born 20 December 1954) is a Mongolian sports shooter. He competed at the 1976 Summer Olympics, the 1980 Summer Olympics and the 1988 Summer Olympics.
