= Yun Chang-ho =

North Korean sports shooter (born 1951)

Personal information
- Native name: 윤창호
- Nationality: North Korean
- Born: 15 May 1951 (age 74)

Sport
- Sport: Sports shooting

Yun Chang-ho (born 15 May 1951) is a North Korean sports shooter. He competed at the 1976 Summer Olympics and the 1980 Summer Olympics.
