= Jarintorn Dangpiam =

Thai sports shooter (born 1974)

Personal information
- Nationality: Thai
- Born: 11 July 1974 (age 50)

Sport
- Sport: Sports shooting

Jarintorn Dangpiam (born 11 July 1974) is a Thai sports shooter. She competed in two events at the 1996 Summer Olympics.
