= Park Jung-hee (sport shooter) =

South Korean sports shooter

Park Jung-hee (born 10 October 1967) is a South Korean sport shooter who competed in the 1988 Summer Olympics and in the 1996 Summer Olympics.
