= Norito Chosa =

Japanese sports shooter (born 1955)

Personal information
- Nationality: Japanese
- Born: 20 June 1955 (age 70)

Sport
- Sport: Sports shooting

Norito Chosa (帖佐 徳人, Chōsa Norito; born 20 June 1955) is a Japanese sports shooter. He competed in the men's 50 metre rifle, prone event at the 1984 Summer Olympics.
