= Shinji Takahashi (sport shooter) =

Japanese sport shooter

Personal information
- Born: 12 October 1937 (age 88)

Sport
- Sport: Sports shooting

Shinji Takahashi (高橋 信司, Takahashi Shinji; born 12 October 1937) is a Japanese sport shooter who competed in the 1964 Summer Olympics.
