= Pavitr Gajaseni =

Thai sports shooter (1932–2015)

Personal information
- Nationality: Thai
- Born: 13 October 1932 Bangkok, Thailand
- Died: February 2015 (aged 82) Bangkok, Thailand

Sport
- Sport: Sports shooting

Pavitr Gajaseni (Thai: ปวิตร คชเสนี, also spelled Kachasanee; 13 October 1932 – February 2015) was a Thai businessman and sports shooter. He was a great-grandson of Prince Kaew Nawarat of Chiang Mai. He was a partner and director of Sony Thai Co. Ltd, and was a founding member of the Skeet & Trap Shooting Association of Thailand. He competed at the 1968 Summer Olympics and the 1976 Summer Olympics. He also competed at the 1974 Asian Games.
