= Samak Chainares =

Thai sport shooter (born 1923)

Personal information
- Born: 22 January 1923

Sport
- Sport: Sports shooting

Maj. Samak Chainares (born 22 January 1923) is a Thai former sports shooter. He competed in the 50 metre pistol event at the 1972 Summer Olympics.
