= Hiroyuki Akatsuka =

Japanese sport shooter

Hiroyuki Akatsuka (赤塚 裕幸, Akatsuka Hiroyuki; born 14 October 1940) is a Japanese sport shooter who competed in the 1984 Summer Olympics.
