= Xu Xiaoguang =

Chinese sports shooter (born 1954)

Xu Xiaoguang (born 3 August 1954) is a Chinese sport shooter who competed in the 1984 Summer Olympics and in the 1988 Summer Olympics.
