= Li Wenjie =

Chinese sport shooter (born 1968)

Li Wenjie (born 10 June 1968) is a Chinese sport shooter who competed in the 1996 Summer Olympics.
