= Meng Gang =

Chinese sport shooter (born 1968)

Meng Gang (born 7 June 1968) is a Chinese sport shooter who competed in the 1988 Summer Olympics, in the 1992 Summer Olympics, and in the 1996 Summer Olympics.
