= Mamoru Inagaki =

Japanese sport shooter (born 1949)

Mamoru Inagaki (稲垣 守, Inagaki Mamoru, born 17 April 1949) is a Japanese sport shooter who competed in the 1988 Summer Olympics and in the 1992 Summer Olympics.
