= Kwak Jung-hoon =

South Korean sport shooter

Kwak Jung-hoon (born 24 June 1958) is a South Korean sport shooter who competed in the 1984 Summer Olympics and in the 1988 Summer Olympics.
