= Lee Sun-bok =

South Korean sport shooter

- Hangul: 이선복
- Hanja: 李善福
- RR: I Seonbok
- MR: I Sŏnbok

Lee Sun-bok (born 3 June 1971) is a South Korean sport shooter who competed in the 1992 Summer Olympics.
