= Kim Yong-bae (sport shooter) =

South Korean sport shooter

Personal information
- Born: 1931 (age 94–95) South Korea

Sport
- Sport: Sports shooting
- Team: Yangji

Korean name
- Hangul: 김용배
- Hanja: 金容倍
- RR: Gim Yongbae
- MR: Kim Yongbae

Kim Yong-bae (Korean: 김용배; born 1931) is a South Korean former sports shooter. He competed in the 50 metre pistol event at the 1968 Summer Olympics.
