= Kim Hye-yeong (sport shooter) =

South Korean sports shooter

Personal information
- Nationality: South Korean
- Born: 17 February 1961 (age 65)

Sport
- Sport: Sports shooting

Kim Hye-yeong (born 17 February 1961) is a South Korean sports shooter. She competed in the women's 25 metre pistol event at the 1984 Summer Olympics.
