= Katsumasa Onishi =

Japanese sport shooter

Katsumasa Onishi (大西 克昌, Ōnishi Katsumasa; born 21 October 1959) is a Japanese sport shooter who competed in the 1992 Summer Olympics.
