= Lee Hye-kyung =

South Korean sport shooter

Lee Hye-kyung (born 13 March 1963) is a South Korean sport shooter who competed in the 1988 Summer Olympics.
