= Park Jeong-ah (sport shooter) =

South Korean sports shooter

Personal information
- Nationality: South Korean
- Born: 20 April 1963 (age 62)

Sport
- Sport: Sports shooting

Park Jeong-ah (born 20 April 1963) is a South Korean sports shooter. She competed in the women's 10 metre air rifle event at the 1984 Summer Olympics.
