= Lee Sang-hee (sport shooter) =

South Korean sports shooter

Personal information
- Nationality: South Korean
- Born: 30 June 1970 (age 54)

Sport
- Sport: Sports shooting

Lee Sang-hee (born 30 June 1970) is a South Korean sports shooter. She competed in the women's double trap event at the 1996 Summer Olympics.
