= Hong Young-ok =

South Korean sport shooter

Hong Young-ok (born 28 December 1970) is a South Korean sport shooter who competed in the 1988 Summer Olympics.
