= Masanobu Ohata =

Japanese sport shooter

Masanobu Ohata (大畑 政修, Ōhata Masanobu; born 19 September 1947) is a Japanese sport shooter who competed in the 1976 Summer Olympics. Where he placed 28th in the Men's 50m pistol event.

== Competition results ==
| Year | Competition | Venue | Position | Event | Result |
|---|---|---|---|---|---|
| 1971 | Asian Championship | Seoul, South Korea | 3rd | 50m Pistol, Men | 545 |
| 1974 | Asian Games | Teheran, Iran | 2nd | 50m Pistol, Men | 550 |
| 1975 | Asian Championship | Kuala Lumpur, Malaysia | 5th | 50m Pistol, Men | 544 |
| 1976 | Olympic Games | Montreal, Canada | 28th | 50m Pistol, Men | 545 |
