= Megumi Inoue =

Japanese sport shooter (born 1973)

Personal information
- Full name: Megumi Inoue
- Nationality: Japan
- Born: 27 April 1973 (age 53) Sagamihara, Kanagawa, Japan
- Height: 1.72 m (5 ft 7 1/2 in)
- Weight: 59 kg (130 lb)

Sport
- Sport: Shooting
- Events: Trap (TR75); Double trap (DT120)
- Club: Japanese Clay Target Shooting; Association
- Coached by: Hiroshi Teranishi
Medal record
Women's shooting
Representing Japan
Asian Championships
Gold medal – first place	2012 Doha	Trap team
Asian Shotgun Championships
Silver medal – second place	2014 Al-Ain	Trap team

Megumi Inoue (井上 恵, Inoue Megumi; born April 27, 1973 in Sagamihara, Kanagawa) is a Japanese sport shooter. She has produced a career tally of six medals, including two golds in women's double trap shooting at the Asian Championships in Kuala Lumpur, Malaysia, and also finished fifth at the 2004 Summer Olympics in Athens. Inoue serves and trains full-time as a member of the Japanese Clay Target Shooting Association, under head coach Hiroshi Teranishi.

Inoue came to prominence in the world shooting scene at the 2004 Asian Championships in Kuala Lumpur, Malaysia, where she claimed the gold medal in the women's double trap final with a score of 138. Inoue's astonishing success and a minimum qualifying score of 106 led to her selection on the Japanese shooting team for her only Olympic debut.

Six months after her illustrious victory from the Asian Championships, Inoue qualified for her first and only Japanese squad in the women's double trap at the 2004 Summer Olympics in Athens. She put up a stringent top-level effort with an unparalleled qualifying score of 106 to seal a third seed in the six-woman final, but fell out of the medal podium by a two-point margin that ended her up in fifth. Inoue's total score of 140 proved to be more rewarding than her previous career feat from the Asian Championships by just two targets.

With the women's double trap being officially removed from the Olympic program, Inoue decided to focus solely on trap shooting. In 2005, she held off a charge from the rest of the field to set a new world-record score of 88 hits for the gold medal victory at the ISSF World Cup meet in Changwon, South Korea.
