= Boxing at the 1986 Asian Games =

Boxing competitions

- Venue: Jamsil Students' Gymnasium
- Dates: 25 September – 4 October 1986
- Competitors: 87 from 12 nations

The Boxing Tournament at the 1986 Asian Games was held in Jamsil Students' Gymnasium, Seoul, South Korea from September 25 to October 4, 1986.

The host nation South Korea dominated the competition, winning all twelve gold medals.

== Schedule ==
R	Round of 16	¼	Quarterfinals	½	Semifinals	F	Final

Event↓/Date →	25th Thu	26th Fri	27th Sat	28th Sun	29th Mon	30th Tue	1st Wed	2nd Thu	3rd Fri	4th Sat
Men's 48 kg	R			¼			½			F
Men's 51 kg		R				¼		½		F
Men's 54 kg	¼						½			F
Men's 57 kg			¼				½			F
Men's 60 kg		R			¼			½		F
Men's 63.5 kg	¼						½			F
Men's 67 kg			¼					½		F
Men's 71 kg		¼					½			F
Men's 75 kg								½		F
Men's 81 kg				¼			½			F
Men's 91 kg					¼			½		F
Men's +91 kg						¼		½		F

== Medalists ==
Event	Gold	Silver	Bronze
Light flyweight (48 kg)	Oh Kwang-soo; South Korea	Supap Boonrawd; Thailand	Mamoru Kuroiwa; Japan
Light flyweight (48 kg)	Oh Kwang-soo; South Korea	Supap Boonrawd; Thailand	Saad Shabbot; Iraq
Flyweight (51 kg)	Kim Kwang-sun; South Korea	Shahuraj Birajdar; India	Kwanchai Samrangit; Thailand
Flyweight (51 kg)	Kim Kwang-sun; South Korea	Shahuraj Birajdar; India	Muhammad Latif; Pakistan
Bantamweight (54 kg)	Moon Sung-kil; South Korea	Sophon Sujarikul; Thailand	G. D. Kamble; India
Bantamweight (54 kg)	Moon Sung-kil; South Korea	Sophon Sujarikul; Thailand	Brix Flores; Philippines
Featherweight (57 kg)	Park Hyeong-ok; South Korea	Adrianus Taroreh; Indonesia	Toshiyasu Kiyosawa; Japan
Featherweight (57 kg)	Park Hyeong-ok; South Korea	Adrianus Taroreh; Indonesia	John Williams; India
Lightweight (60 kg)	Kwon Hyun-kyu; South Korea	Leopoldo Cantancio; Philippines	Dal Bahadur Ranamagar; Nepal
Lightweight (60 kg)	Kwon Hyun-kyu; South Korea	Leopoldo Cantancio; Philippines	Wanchai Pongsri; Thailand
Light welterweight (63.5 kg)	Kim Ki-taek; South Korea	Seera Jayaram; India	Manoj Bahadur Shrestha; Nepal
Light welterweight (63.5 kg)	Kim Ki-taek; South Korea	Seera Jayaram; India	Yoshiaki Takahashi; Japan
Welterweight (67 kg)	Kim Dong-kil; South Korea	Sumruay Mongsont; Thailand	Gopal Dewang; India
Welterweight (67 kg)	Kim Dong-kil; South Korea	Sumruay Mongsont; Thailand	Kunihiro Miura; Japan
Light middleweight (71 kg)	Lee Hae-jung; South Korea	Chiharu Ogiwara; Japan	Ernesto Coronel; Philippines
Light middleweight (71 kg)	Lee Hae-jung; South Korea	Chiharu Ogiwara; Japan	Abrar Hussain; Pakistan
Middleweight (75 kg)	Shin Joon-sup; South Korea	Narong Inphrom; Thailand	Sushil Pokhrel; Nepal
Middleweight (75 kg)	Shin Joon-sup; South Korea	Narong Inphrom; Thailand	Manjit Pal Singh; India
Light heavyweight (81 kg)	Min Byung-yong; South Korea	Hussain Shah; Pakistan	Dhan Bahadur Gurung; India
Light heavyweight (81 kg)	Min Byung-yong; South Korea	Hussain Shah; Pakistan	Mosharraf Hossain; Bangladesh
Heavyweight (91 kg)	Kim Yoo-hyun; South Korea	Daljit Singh; India	Kausar Abbas; Pakistan
Heavyweight (91 kg)	Kim Yoo-hyun; South Korea	Daljit Singh; India	Montaser Shuaib; Kuwait
Super heavyweight (+91 kg)	Baik Hyun-man; South Korea	Jaipal Singh; India	Tul Bahadur Thapa; Nepal
Super heavyweight (+91 kg)	Baik Hyun-man; South Korea	Jaipal Singh; India	Muhammad Yousaf; Pakistan

== Medal table ==
Rank	Nation	Gold	Silver	Bronze	Total
1	South Korea (KOR)	12	0	0	12
2	India (IND)	0	4	5	9
3	Thailand (THA)	0	4	2	6
4	Japan (JPN)	0	1	4	5
4	Pakistan (PAK)	0	1	4	5
6	Philippines (PHI)	0	1	2	3
7	Indonesia (INA)	0	1	0	1
8	Nepal (NEP)	0	0	4	4
9	Bangladesh (BAN)	0	0	1	1
9	Iraq (IRQ)	0	0	1	1
9	Kuwait (KUW)	0	0	1	1
Totals (11 entries)		12	12	24	48

== Participating nations ==
A total of 87 athletes from 12 nations competed in boxing at the 1986 Asian Games:

- Bangladesh (2)
- India (12)
- Indonesia (4)
- Iraq (5)
- Japan (8)
- Kuwait (6)
- Nepal (12)
- Pakistan (10)
- Philippines (6)
- South Korea (12)
- Sri Lanka (1)
- Thailand (9)
