= List of Asian Games medalists in boxing =

This is the complete list of Asian Games medalists in boxing from 1954 to 2026.

== Men ==
=== Light flyweight ===
- 48 kg: 1966–2006
- 49 kg: 2010–2018

Games	Gold	Silver	Bronze
1966 Bangkok	Prapan Duangchaoom (THA)	Su Sang-young (KOR)	Masao Karasawa (JPN)
1966 Bangkok	Prapan Duangchaoom (THA)	Su Sang-young (KOR)	Rodolfo Diaz (PHI)
1970 Bangkok	Kim Chung-bae (KOR)	Manolo Vicera (PHI)	Yoshimitsu Aragaki (JPN)
1970 Bangkok	Kim Chung-bae (KOR)	Manolo Vicera (PHI)	Surapong Sripirom (THA)
1974 Tehran	Park Chan-hee (KOR)	Abdolreza Ansari (IRN)	Noboru Uchiyama (JPN)
1974 Tehran	Park Chan-hee (KOR)	Abdolreza Ansari (IRN)	Kim U-gil (PRK)
1978 Bangkok	Siri Supanya (THA)	Ri Byong-uk (PRK)	Koki Suzuki (JPN)
1978 Bangkok	Siri Supanya (THA)	Ri Byong-uk (PRK)	Ali Bux (PAK)
1982 New Delhi	Heo Yong-mo (KOR)	Efren Tabanas (PHI)	Seiki Segawa (JPN)
1982 New Delhi	Heo Yong-mo (KOR)	Efren Tabanas (PHI)	Ali Bux (PAK)
1986 Seoul	Oh Kwang-soo (KOR)	Supap Boonrawd (THA)	Saad Shabbot (IRQ)
1986 Seoul	Oh Kwang-soo (KOR)	Supap Boonrawd (THA)	Mamoru Kuroiwa (JPN)
1990 Beijing	Yang Suk-jin (KOR)	Chatchai Sasakul (THA)	Seigi Ichikado (JPN)
1990 Beijing	Yang Suk-jin (KOR)	Chatchai Sasakul (THA)	Elias Recaido (PHI)
1994 Hiroshima	Mansueto Velasco (PHI)	Pramuansak Phosuwan (THA)	Hermensen Ballo (INA)
1994 Hiroshima	Mansueto Velasco (PHI)	Pramuansak Phosuwan (THA)	Birju Shah (IND)
1998 Bangkok	Suban Pannon (THA)	Yang Xiangzhong (CHN)	Kim Sung-soo (KOR)
1998 Bangkok	Suban Pannon (THA)	Yang Xiangzhong (CHN)	Pak Chun (PRK)
2002 Busan	Kim Ki-suk (KOR)	Harry Tañamor (PHI)	Suban Pannon (THA)
2002 Busan	Kim Ki-suk (KOR)	Harry Tañamor (PHI)	Mekhrodj Umarov (TJK)
2006 Doha	Zou Shiming (CHN)	Suban Pannon (THA)	Hong Moo-won (KOR)
2006 Doha	Zou Shiming (CHN)	Suban Pannon (THA)	Godfrey Castro (PHI)
2010 Guangzhou	Zou Shiming (CHN)	Birzhan Zhakypov (KAZ)	Vic Saludar (PHI)
2010 Guangzhou	Zou Shiming (CHN)	Birzhan Zhakypov (KAZ)	Amnat Ruenroeng (THA)
2014 Incheon	Shin Jong-hun (KOR)	Birzhan Zhakypov (KAZ)	Turat Osmonov (KGZ)
2014 Incheon	Shin Jong-hun (KOR)	Birzhan Zhakypov (KAZ)	Mark Anthony Barriga (PHI)
2018 Jakarta–Palembang	Amit Panghal (IND)	Hasanboy Dusmatov (UZB)	Wu Zhonglin (CHN)
2018 Jakarta–Palembang	Amit Panghal (IND)	Hasanboy Dusmatov (UZB)	Carlo Paalam (PHI)

=== Flyweight ===
- 51 kg: 1954–2006
- 52 kg: 2010–2018
- 51 kg: 2022

Games	Gold	Silver	Bronze
1954 Manila	Ernesto Sajo (PHI)	Lee Chang-kyo (KOR)	Aye Kho (BIR)
1958 Tokyo	Akio Maki (JPN)	Hla Nyunt (BIR)	Ezaria Ilkhanoff (IRN)
1958 Tokyo	Akio Maki (JPN)	Hla Nyunt (BIR)	Kim Chang-han (KOR)
1962 Jakarta	Chung Shin-cho (KOR)	Masao Karasawa (JPN)	Senarath Jayasuriya (CEY)
1962 Jakarta	Chung Shin-cho (KOR)	Masao Karasawa (JPN)	Ghulam Sarwar (PAK)
1966 Bangkok	Son Young-chan (KOR)	Idwan Anwar (INA)	Akinami Sato (JPN)
1966 Bangkok	Son Young-chan (KOR)	Idwan Anwar (INA)	Ahmad Mokhtar (MAL)
1970 Bangkok	Jee Yong-ju (KOR)	Miyoji Tateyama (JPN)	Ferry Moniaga (INA)
1970 Bangkok	Jee Yong-ju (KOR)	Miyoji Tateyama (JPN)	Chen Wei-jen (ROC)
1974 Tehran	Ku Yong-jo (PRK)	Hwang Chul-soon (KOR)	Chander Narayanan (IND)
1974 Tehran	Ku Yong-jo (PRK)	Hwang Chul-soon (KOR)	Kiyoyasu Uezu (JPN)
1978 Bangkok	Koki Ishii (JPN)	Johny Riberu (INA)	Muhammad Sadiq (PAK)
1978 Bangkok	Koki Ishii (JPN)	Johny Riberu (INA)	Wijaya Nimal Perera (SRI)
1982 New Delhi	Teeraporn Saengano (THA)	Babar Ali Khan (PAK)	Kazuhiko Abe (JPN)
1982 New Delhi	Teeraporn Saengano (THA)	Babar Ali Khan (PAK)	Kwon Chae-o (KOR)
1986 Seoul	Kim Kwang-sun (KOR)	Shahuraj Birajdar (IND)	Muhammad Latif (PAK)
1986 Seoul	Kim Kwang-sun (KOR)	Shahuraj Birajdar (IND)	Kwanchai Samrangit (THA)
1990 Beijing	Lee Chang-hwan (KOR)	Muhammad Latif (PAK)	Vichairachanon Khadpo (THA)
1990 Beijing	Lee Chang-hwan (KOR)	Muhammad Latif (PAK)	None awarded
1994 Hiroshima	Elias Recaido (PHI)	Kenji Nakazono (JPN)	Ali Muhammad Qambrani (PAK)
1994 Hiroshima	Elias Recaido (PHI)	Kenji Nakazono (JPN)	Vichairachanon Khadpo (THA)
1998 Bangkok	Pramuansak Phosuwan (THA)	Hermensen Ballo (INA)	Choi Jin-woo (KOR)
1998 Bangkok	Pramuansak Phosuwan (THA)	Hermensen Ballo (INA)	Haider Ali (PAK)
2002 Busan	Somjit Jongjohor (THA)	Nauman Karim (PAK)	Zou Gang (CHN)
2002 Busan	Somjit Jongjohor (THA)	Nauman Karim (PAK)	Kim Tae-kyu (KOR)
2006 Doha	Violito Payla (PHI)	Somjit Jongjohor (THA)	Yang Bo (CHN)
2006 Doha	Violito Payla (PHI)	Somjit Jongjohor (THA)	Katsuaki Susa (JPN)
2010 Guangzhou	Rey Saludar (PHI)	Chang Yong (CHN)	Suranjoy Singh (IND)
2010 Guangzhou	Rey Saludar (PHI)	Chang Yong (CHN)	Katsuaki Susa (JPN)
2014 Incheon	Ilyas Suleimenov (KAZ)	Shakhobidin Zoirov (UZB)	Shota Hayashida (JPN)
2014 Incheon	Ilyas Suleimenov (KAZ)	Shakhobidin Zoirov (UZB)	Muhammad Waseem (PAK)
2018 Jakarta–Palembang	Jasurbek Latipov (UZB)	Rogen Ladon (PHI)	Azat Usenaliev (KGZ)
2018 Jakarta–Palembang	Jasurbek Latipov (UZB)	Rogen Ladon (PHI)	Yuttapong Tongdee (THA)
2022 Hangzhou	Hasanboy Dusmatov (UZB)	Thitisan Panmod (THA)	Tomoya Tsuboi (JPN)
2022 Hangzhou	Hasanboy Dusmatov (UZB)	Thitisan Panmod (THA)	So Chon-ryong (PRK)

=== Bantamweight ===
- 54 kg: 1954–2006
- 56 kg: 2010–2018
- 55 kg: 2026–

Games	Gold	Silver	Bronze
1954 Manila	Alejandro Ortuoste (PHI)	Hempala Jayasuriya (CEY)	Kichio Miyake (JPN)
1958 Tokyo	Thein Myint (BIR)	Takeo Suzuki (JPN)	Muhammad Nasir (PAK)
1958 Tokyo	Thein Myint (BIR)	Takeo Suzuki (JPN)	Jacinto Diaz (PHI)
1962 Jakarta	Kiyoshi Tanabe (JPN)	Frans Soplanit (INA)	Tin Tun (BIR)
1962 Jakarta	Kiyoshi Tanabe (JPN)	Frans Soplanit (INA)	Jose Ramirez (PHI)
1966 Bangkok	Cherdchai Udompaichitkul (THA)	Narayan More (IND)	Win Maung (BIR)
1966 Bangkok	Cherdchai Udompaichitkul (THA)	Narayan More (IND)	Koichi Okada (JPN)
1970 Bangkok	Ricardo Fortaleza (PHI)	Win Maung (BIR)	Idwan Anwar (INA)
1970 Bangkok	Ricardo Fortaleza (PHI)	Win Maung (BIR)	Kim Tae-ho (KOR)
1974 Tehran	Hitoshi Ishigaki (JPN)	Jung Yong-hwan (PRK)	Hamlet Minasian (IRN)
1974 Tehran	Hitoshi Ishigaki (JPN)	Jung Yong-hwan (PRK)	Buyangiin Ganbat (MGL)
1978 Bangkok	Hwang Chul-soon (KOR)	Nyo Win (BIR)	Sumanasiri Caldera (SRI)
1978 Bangkok	Hwang Chul-soon (KOR)	Nyo Win (BIR)	Pradit Srisathit (THA)
1982 New Delhi	Moon Sung-kil (KOR)	Wanchai Pongsri (THA)	Mukhtar Muhammad (PAK)
1982 New Delhi	Moon Sung-kil (KOR)	Wanchai Pongsri (THA)	Pyon Song-o (PRK)
1986 Seoul	Moon Sung-kil (KOR)	Sophon Sujarikul (THA)	G. D. Kamble (IND)
1986 Seoul	Moon Sung-kil (KOR)	Sophon Sujarikul (THA)	Brix Flores (PHI)
1990 Beijing	Roberto Jalnaiz (PHI)	Hwang Kyung-sup (KOR)	Franky Mamuaya (INA)
1990 Beijing	Roberto Jalnaiz (PHI)	Hwang Kyung-sup (KOR)	Tseyen-Oidovyn Tserennyam (MGL)
1994 Hiroshima	Yeom Jong-kil (KOR)	Abdul Khaliq (PAK)	Gurmeet Singh (IND)
1994 Hiroshima	Yeom Jong-kil (KOR)	Abdul Khaliq (PAK)	Anthony Igusquisa (PHI)
1998 Bangkok	Dingko Singh (IND)	Timur Tulyakov (UZB)	Marat Mazimbayev (KAZ)
1998 Bangkok	Dingko Singh (IND)	Timur Tulyakov (UZB)	Sontaya Wongprates (THA)
2002 Busan	Kim Won-il (KOR)	Bekzod Khidirov (UZB)	Taalaibek Kadiraliev (KGZ)
2002 Busan	Kim Won-il (KOR)	Bekzod Khidirov (UZB)	Abdusalom Khasanov (TJK)
2006 Doha	Joan Tipon (PHI)	Han Soon-chul (KOR)	Enkhbatyn Badar-Uugan (MGL)
2006 Doha	Joan Tipon (PHI)	Han Soon-chul (KOR)	Worapoj Petchkoom (THA)
2010 Guangzhou	Worapoj Petchkoom (THA)	Zhang Jiawei (CHN)	Ri Myong-son (PRK)
2010 Guangzhou	Worapoj Petchkoom (THA)	Zhang Jiawei (CHN)	Wessam Salamana (SYR)
2014 Incheon	Ham Sang-myeong (KOR)	Zhang Jiawei (CHN)	Kairat Yeraliyev (KAZ)
2014 Incheon	Ham Sang-myeong (KOR)	Zhang Jiawei (CHN)	Mario Fernandez (PHI)
2018 Jakarta–Palembang	Mirazizbek Mirzakhalilov (UZB)	Jo Hyo-nam (PRK)	Xu Boxiang (CHN)
2018 Jakarta–Palembang	Mirazizbek Mirzakhalilov (UZB)	Jo Hyo-nam (PRK)	Sunan Agung Amoragam (INA)
2026 Aichi–Nagoya	Rui Yamaguchi (JPN)	Carlo Paalam (PHI)	Makhmud Sabyrkhan (KAZ)
2026 Aichi–Nagoya	Rui Yamaguchi (JPN)	Carlo Paalam (PHI)	Kharkhüügiin Bilgüünsaikhan (MGL)

=== Featherweight ===
- 57 kg: 1954–2022

Games	Gold	Silver	Bronze
1954 Manila	Park Kum-hyun (KOR)	Mauro Dizon (PHI)	Chandrasena Jayasuriya (CEY)
1958 Tokyo	Isami Ikeyama (JPN)	Dionisio Guevarra (PHI)	Song Soon-chun (KOR)
1958 Tokyo	Isami Ikeyama (JPN)	Dionisio Guevarra (PHI)	Austin Dunsford (SIN)
1962 Jakarta	Samphan Payonrathana (THA)	Mamoru Hayashi (JPN)	Than Tun (BIR)
1962 Jakarta	Samphan Payonrathana (THA)	Mamoru Hayashi (JPN)	Egino Grafia (PHI)
1966 Bangkok	Kim Sung-eun (KOR)	Thongchai Chandarasukhon (THA)	Nasser Aghaei (IRN)
1966 Bangkok	Kim Sung-eun (KOR)	Thongchai Chandarasukhon (THA)	Harunobu Honma (JPN)
1970 Bangkok	Kim Sung-eun (KOR)	Muniswamy Venu (IND)	Samad Mir (PAK)
1970 Bangkok	Kim Sung-eun (KOR)	Muniswamy Venu (IND)	Nemesio Gonzaga (PHI)
1974 Tehran	Yu Jong-man (KOR)	Jabbar Feli (IRN)	Willie Lucas (PHI)
1974 Tehran	Yu Jong-man (KOR)	Jabbar Feli (IRN)	Arin Seubsanon (THA)
1978 Bangkok	Ku Yong-jo (PRK)	Khan Muhammad (PAK)	Jung Taek-dong (KOR)
1978 Bangkok	Ku Yong-jo (PRK)	Khan Muhammad (PAK)	Ravsalyn Otgonbayar (MGL)
1982 New Delhi	Jo Ryon-sik (PRK)	Park Ki-chul (KOR)	Shinji Higuchi (JPN)
1982 New Delhi	Jo Ryon-sik (PRK)	Park Ki-chul (KOR)	Nidal Haddad (SYR)
1986 Seoul	Park Hyeong-ok (KOR)	Adrianus Taroreh (INA)	John Williams (IND)
1986 Seoul	Park Hyeong-ok (KOR)	Adrianus Taroreh (INA)	Toshiyasu Kiyosawa (JPN)
1990 Beijing	Raiman Boonthom (THA)	Jin Myung-dol (KOR)	Sandagsürengiin Erdenebat (MGL)
1990 Beijing	Raiman Boonthom (THA)	Jin Myung-dol (KOR)	Zaigham Maseel (PAK)
1994 Hiroshima	Somluck Kamsing (THA)	Zaigham Maseel (PAK)	Nemo Bahari (INA)
1994 Hiroshima	Somluck Kamsing (THA)	Zaigham Maseel (PAK)	Eric Canoy (PHI)
1998 Bangkok	Somluck Kamsing (THA)	Tulkunbay Turgunov (UZB)	Norihisa Tomimoto (JPN)
1998 Bangkok	Somluck Kamsing (THA)	Tulkunbay Turgunov (UZB)	Eric Canoy (PHI)
2002 Busan	Mehrullah Lassi (PAK)	Galib Jafarov (KAZ)	Chen Tongzhou (CHN)
2002 Busan	Mehrullah Lassi (PAK)	Galib Jafarov (KAZ)	Yasser Sheikhan (SYR)
2006 Doha	Bahodirjon Sultonov (UZB)	Zorigtbaataryn Enkhzorig (MGL)	Galib Jafarov (KAZ)
2006 Doha	Bahodirjon Sultonov (UZB)	Zorigtbaataryn Enkhzorig (MGL)	Kim Song-guk (PRK)
2022 Hangzhou	Abdumalik Khalokov (UZB)	Shudai Harada (JPN)	Lü Ping (CHN)
2022 Hangzhou	Abdumalik Khalokov (UZB)	Shudai Harada (JPN)	Rujakran Juntrong (THA)

=== Lightweight ===
- 60 kg: 1954–

Games	Gold	Silver	Bronze
1954 Manila	Celedonio Espinosa (PHI)	Henry Wong (ROC)	Hiroshi Iwabuchi (JPN)
1958 Tokyo	Chung Dong-hoon (KOR)	Shinichiro Suzuki (JPN)	Sundar Rao (IND)
1958 Tokyo	Chung Dong-hoon (KOR)	Shinichiro Suzuki (JPN)	Celedonio Espinosa (PHI)
1962 Jakarta	Padam Bahadur Mall (IND)	Kanemaru Shiratori (JPN)	You Chin Hong (CAM)
1962 Jakarta	Padam Bahadur Mall (IND)	Kanemaru Shiratori (JPN)	Catalino Arpon (PHI)
1966 Bangkok	Rodolfo Arpon (PHI)	Lee Moon-ung (KOR)	Eltefat Talebi (IRN)
1966 Bangkok	Rodolfo Arpon (PHI)	Lee Moon-ung (KOR)	Masataka Takayama (JPN)
1970 Bangkok	Kim Hyun-chi (KOR)	Tomiharu Tonosaki (JPN)	Jootje Waney (INA)
1970 Bangkok	Kim Hyun-chi (KOR)	Tomiharu Tonosaki (JPN)	Thongchai Chandarasukhon (THA)
1974 Tehran	Kim Tae-ho (KOR)	Sodnomyn Gombo (MGL)	Muniswamy Venu (IND)
1974 Tehran	Kim Tae-ho (KOR)	Sodnomyn Gombo (MGL)	Hossein Madardoust (IRN)
1978 Bangkok	Choi Chung-il (KOR)	Ruben Mares (PHI)	Haram Khan (BIR)
1978 Bangkok	Choi Chung-il (KOR)	Ruben Mares (PHI)	Yukio Odagiri (JPN)
1982 New Delhi	Jong Jo-ung (PRK)	Kwon Hyun-kyu (KOR)	Jaslal Pradhan (IND)
1982 New Delhi	Jong Jo-ung (PRK)	Kwon Hyun-kyu (KOR)	Fernando de Assis (PHI)
1986 Seoul	Kwon Hyun-kyu (KOR)	Leopoldo Cantancio (PHI)	Dal Bahadur Ranamagar (NEP)
1986 Seoul	Kwon Hyun-kyu (KOR)	Leopoldo Cantancio (PHI)	Wanchai Pongsri (THA)
1990 Beijing	Lee Jae-kwon (KOR)	Yu Chuan (CHN)	Vongkot Chinda (LAO)
1990 Beijing	Lee Jae-kwon (KOR)	Yu Chuan (CHN)	Leopoldo Cantancio (PHI)
1994 Hiroshima	Tsuyoshi Yaegashi (JPN)	Chaleo Somwong (THA)	Jamaan Al-Seghaier (KSA)
1994 Hiroshima	Tsuyoshi Yaegashi (JPN)	Chaleo Somwong (THA)	Bekmyrat Durdyýew (TKM)
1998 Bangkok	Pongsith Wiangwiset (THA)	Timur Suleymanov (UZB)	Shin Eun-chul (KOR)
1998 Bangkok	Pongsith Wiangwiset (THA)	Timur Suleymanov (UZB)	Tümentsetsegiin Üitümen (MGL)
2002 Busan	Dilshod Mahmudov (UZB)	Baik Jong-sub (KOR)	Ruslan Mussinov (KAZ)
2002 Busan	Dilshod Mahmudov (UZB)	Baik Jong-sub (KOR)	Adnan Yusoh (MAS)
2006 Doha	Hu Qing (CHN)	Uranchimegiin Mönkh-Erdene (MGL)	Genebert Basadre (PHI)
2006 Doha	Hu Qing (CHN)	Uranchimegiin Mönkh-Erdene (MGL)	Bekzod Khidirov (UZB)
2010 Guangzhou	Vikas Krishan Yadav (IND)	Hu Qing (CHN)	Han Soon-chul (KOR)
2010 Guangzhou	Vikas Krishan Yadav (IND)	Hu Qing (CHN)	Hurshid Tojibaev (UZB)
2014 Incheon	Dorjnyambuugiin Otgondalai (MGL)	Charly Suarez (PHI)	Obada Al-Kasbeh (JOR)
2014 Incheon	Dorjnyambuugiin Otgondalai (MGL)	Charly Suarez (PHI)	Satoshi Shimizu (JPN)
2018 Jakarta–Palembang	Erdenebatyn Tsendbaatar (MGL)	Shunkor Abdurasulov (UZB)	Shan Jun (CHN)
2018 Jakarta–Palembang	Erdenebatyn Tsendbaatar (MGL)	Shunkor Abdurasulov (UZB)	Rujakran Juntrong (THA)
2026 Aichi–Nagoya	Abdumalik Khalokov (UZB)	Jang Dong-hwan (KOR)	Shunsuke Kitamoto (JPN)
2026 Aichi–Nagoya	Abdumalik Khalokov (UZB)	Jang Dong-hwan (KOR)	Akmal Ubaidov (TJK)

=== Light welterweight ===
- 63.5 kg: 1954–2002
- 64 kg: 2006–2018
- 63.5 kg: 2022

Games	Gold	Silver	Bronze
1954 Manila	Ernesto Porto (PHI)	Lee Sam-yong (KOR)	Hisao Inoue (JPN)
1958 Tokyo	Shigemasa Kawakami (JPN)	Vazik Kazarian (IRN)	Kim Deuk-bong (KOR)
1958 Tokyo	Shigemasa Kawakami (JPN)	Vazik Kazarian (IRN)	Sueb Chundakowsolaya (THA)
1962 Jakarta	Kim Deuk-bong (KOR)	Sukda Songsang (THA)	Johnny Bolang (INA)
1962 Jakarta	Kim Deuk-bong (KOR)	Sukda Songsang (THA)	Muhammad Sharif (PAK)
1966 Bangkok	Niyom Prasertsom (THA)	Said Fidal (INA)	Yoshihisa Futomi (JPN)
1966 Bangkok	Niyom Prasertsom (THA)	Said Fidal (INA)	Muhammad Khaliq (PAK)
1970 Bangkok	Bantow Srisook (THA)	Khieu Soeun (KHM)	Yasutsune Uehara (JPN)
1970 Bangkok	Bantow Srisook (THA)	Khieu Soeun (KHM)	Eugenio Valmocina (PHI)
1974 Tehran	Ro Yong-so (PRK)	Park Tai-shik (KOR)	Farshid Enteghami (IRN)
1974 Tehran	Ro Yong-so (PRK)	Park Tai-shik (KOR)	Satoshi Fukuda (JPN)
1978 Bangkok	Kim In-chang (KOR)	Vichit Praianan (THA)	C. C. Machaiah (IND)
1978 Bangkok	Kim In-chang (KOR)	Vichit Praianan (THA)	Khastyn Jamgan (MGL)
1982 New Delhi	Kim Dong-kil (KOR)	Dhawee Umponmaha (THA)	Farouk Janjoun (IRQ)
1982 New Delhi	Kim Dong-kil (KOR)	Dhawee Umponmaha (THA)	Son Son-chan (PRK)
1986 Seoul	Kim Ki-taek (KOR)	Seera Jayaram (IND)	Yoshiaki Takahashi (JPN)
1986 Seoul	Kim Ki-taek (KOR)	Seera Jayaram (IND)	Manoj Bahadur Shrestha (NEP)
1990 Beijing	Ahmad Mayez Khanji (SYR)	Kunihiro Miura (JPN)	Nyamaagiin Altankhuyag (MGL)
1990 Beijing	Ahmad Mayez Khanji (SYR)	Kunihiro Miura (JPN)	Arlo Chavez (PHI)
1994 Hiroshima	Reynaldo Galido (PHI)	Usman Ullah Khan (PAK)	Bulat Niyazymbetov (KAZ)
1994 Hiroshima	Reynaldo Galido (PHI)	Usman Ullah Khan (PAK)	Pornchai Thongburan (THA)
1998 Bangkok	Muhammad Abdullaev (UZB)	Willem Papilaya (INA)	Densmaagiin Enkhsaikhan (MGL)
1998 Bangkok	Muhammad Abdullaev (UZB)	Willem Papilaya (INA)	Pongsak Rientuanthong (THA)
2002 Busan	Nurzhan Karimzhanov (KAZ)	Asghar Ali Shah (PAK)	Shin Myung-hoon (KOR)
2002 Busan	Nurzhan Karimzhanov (KAZ)	Asghar Ali Shah (PAK)	Bakhyt Sarsekbayev (UZB)
2006 Doha	Manus Boonjumnong (THA)	Shin Myung-hoon (KOR)	Serik Sapiyev (KAZ)
2006 Doha	Manus Boonjumnong (THA)	Shin Myung-hoon (KOR)	Dilshod Mahmudov (UZB)
2010 Guangzhou	Daniyar Yeleussinov (KAZ)	V. Santhosh Kumar (IND)	Wuttichai Masuk (THA)
2010 Guangzhou	Daniyar Yeleussinov (KAZ)	V. Santhosh Kumar (IND)	Sanjarbek Rahmonov (UZB)
2014 Incheon	Wuttichai Masuk (THA)	Lim Hyun-chul (KOR)	Masatsugu Kawachi (JPN)
2014 Incheon	Wuttichai Masuk (THA)	Lim Hyun-chul (KOR)	Aziz Bebitow (TKM)
2018 Jakarta–Palembang	Ikboljon Kholdarov (UZB)	Baatarsükhiin Chinzorig (MGL)	Daisuke Narimatsu (JPN)
2018 Jakarta–Palembang	Ikboljon Kholdarov (UZB)	Baatarsükhiin Chinzorig (MGL)	Wuttichai Masuk (THA)
2022 Hangzhou	None awarded	Lai Chu-en (TPE)	Ali Qasim (IRQ)
2022 Hangzhou	None awarded	Lai Chu-en (TPE)	Bunjong Sinsiri (THA)

=== Welterweight ===
- 67 kg: 1954–2002
- 69 kg: 2006–2018

Games	Gold	Silver	Bronze
1954 Manila	Kazuma Fujimoto (JPN)	Bulat Bin Ismail (SIN)	Kim Yoon-seo (KOR)
1958 Tokyo	Kim Ki-soo (KOR)	Soren Pirjanian (IRN)	Toshiro Onuki (JPN)
1958 Tokyo	Kim Ki-soo (KOR)	Soren Pirjanian (IRN)	Tongchai Teptani (THA)
1962 Jakarta	Manfredo Alipala (PHI)	Kichijiro Hamada (JPN)	Choi Song-keun (KOR)
1962 Jakarta	Manfredo Alipala (PHI)	Kichijiro Hamada (JPN)	Singto Jamjitman (THA)
1966 Bangkok	Park Koo-il (KOR)	Sukda Songsang (THA)	Hideo Mukubayashi (JPN)
1966 Bangkok	Park Koo-il (KOR)	Sukda Songsang (THA)	Terence Stahlman (MAL)
1970 Bangkok	Jung Young-geun (KOR)	Long Savoen (KHM)	Yoshitsugu Kawabe (JPN)
1970 Bangkok	Jung Young-geun (KOR)	Long Savoen (KHM)	Virat Vilarlak (THA)
1974 Tehran	Kim Ju-seok (KOR)	Yoshifumi Seki (JPN)	Frans van Bronckhorst (INA)
1974 Tehran	Kim Ju-seok (KOR)	Yoshifumi Seki (JPN)	Ahmad Poureftekhari (IRN)
1978 Bangkok	Hwang Choong-jai (KOR)	Wallop Totassa (THA)	Intisar Jabbar (IRQ)
1978 Bangkok	Hwang Choong-jai (KOR)	Wallop Totassa (THA)	Yusoff Hashim (MAL)
1982 New Delhi	Chung Yong-beom (KOR)	Ryu Bun-hwa (PRK)	C. C. Machaiah (IND)
1982 New Delhi	Chung Yong-beom (KOR)	Ryu Bun-hwa (PRK)	Raymundo Suico (PHI)
1986 Seoul	Kim Dong-kil (KOR)	Sumruay Mongsont (THA)	Gopal Dewang (IND)
1986 Seoul	Kim Dong-kil (KOR)	Sumruay Mongsont (THA)	Kunihiro Miura (JPN)
1990 Beijing	Chainarong Kanha (THA)	Liu Lijun (CHN)	Chun Jin-chul (KOR)
1990 Beijing	Chainarong Kanha (THA)	Liu Lijun (CHN)	Chitra Bahadur Gurung (NEP)
1994 Hiroshima	Nurzhan Smanov (KAZ)	Arkhom Chenglai (THA)	Anoushiravan Nourian (IRI)
1994 Hiroshima	Nurzhan Smanov (KAZ)	Arkhom Chenglai (THA)	Nariman Ataev (UZB)
1998 Bangkok	Parkpoom Jangphonak (THA)	Nurzhan Smanov (KAZ)	Bae Ho-jo (KOR)
1998 Bangkok	Parkpoom Jangphonak (THA)	Nurzhan Smanov (KAZ)	Nariman Ataev (UZB)
2002 Busan	Kim Jung-joo (KOR)	Sergey Rychko (KAZ)	Manon Boonjumnong (THA)
2002 Busan	Kim Jung-joo (KOR)	Sergey Rychko (KAZ)	Sherzod Husanov (UZB)
2006 Doha	Bakhyt Sarsekbayev (KAZ)	Angkhan Chomphuphuang (THA)	Hanati Silamu (CHN)
2006 Doha	Bakhyt Sarsekbayev (KAZ)	Angkhan Chomphuphuang (THA)	Mohammad Sattarpour (IRI)
2010 Guangzhou	Serik Sapiyev (KAZ)	Uktamjon Rahmonov (UZB)	Maimaitituersun Qiong (CHN)
2010 Guangzhou	Serik Sapiyev (KAZ)	Uktamjon Rahmonov (UZB)	Jargalyn Otgonjargal (MGL)
2014 Incheon	Daniyar Yeleussinov (KAZ)	Israil Madrimov (UZB)	Apichet Saensit (THA)
2014 Incheon	Daniyar Yeleussinov (KAZ)	Israil Madrimov (UZB)	Serdar Hudaýberdiýew (TKM)
2018 Jakarta–Palembang	Bobo-Usmon Baturov (UZB)	Aslanbek Shymbergenov (KAZ)	Zeyad Ishaish (JOR)
2018 Jakarta–Palembang	Bobo-Usmon Baturov (UZB)	Aslanbek Shymbergenov (KAZ)	Sailom Adi (THA)

=== Light middleweight ===
- 71 kg: 1954–2022
- 70 kg: 2026–

Games	Gold	Silver	Bronze
1954 Manila	Vicente Tuñacao (PHI)	Yutaka Kobashi (JPN)	None awarded
1958 Tokyo	Osamu Takahashi (JPN)	Ghasem Amiryavari (IRN)	Stanley Majid (BIR)
1958 Tokyo	Osamu Takahashi (JPN)	Ghasem Amiryavari (IRN)	Bait Hussain (PAK)
1962 Jakarta	Koji Masuda (JPN)	Shin Yang-il (KOR)	Kumar Rai (BIR)
1962 Jakarta	Koji Masuda (JPN)	Shin Yang-il (KOR)	Buddy D'Souza (IND)
1966 Bangkok	Lee Hong-man (KOR)	Muhammad Ghaznavi (PAK)	Toyohiro Yamamoto (JPN)
1966 Bangkok	Lee Hong-man (KOR)	Muhammad Ghaznavi (PAK)	Felix Ocampo (PHI)
1970 Bangkok	Park Hyung-suk (KOR)	Ni Ni (BIR)	Mohammad Saroukhani (IRN)
1970 Bangkok	Park Hyung-suk (KOR)	Ni Ni (BIR)	Nicolas Aquilino (PHI)
1974 Tehran	Sharif Delaram (IRN)	Jang Ho-ryon (PRK)	Siraj-ud-Din (PAK)
1974 Tehran	Sharif Delaram (IRN)	Jang Ho-ryon (PRK)	Nicolas Aquilino (PHI)
1978 Bangkok	Park Il-chun (KOR)	Rabieb Sangnual (THA)	Muluk Singh (IND)
1978 Bangkok	Park Il-chun (KOR)	Rabieb Sangnual (THA)	Muhammad Saeed (PAK)
1982 New Delhi	Lee Hae-jung (KOR)	Imad Idriss (SYR)	Muluk Singh (IND)
1982 New Delhi	Lee Hae-jung (KOR)	Imad Idriss (SYR)	Muhammad Niaz (PAK)
1986 Seoul	Lee Hae-jung (KOR)	Chiharu Ogiwara (JPN)	Abrar Hussain (PAK)
1986 Seoul	Lee Hae-jung (KOR)	Chiharu Ogiwara (JPN)	Ernesto Coronel (PHI)
1990 Beijing	Abrar Hussain (PAK)	Wang Yawei (CHN)	Hendrik Simangunsong (INA)
1990 Beijing	Abrar Hussain (PAK)	Wang Yawei (CHN)	Gopal Dewang (IND)
1994 Hiroshima	Kanatbek Shagatayev (KAZ)	Pan Feng (CHN)	Ghiath Tayfour (SYR)
1994 Hiroshima	Kanatbek Shagatayev (KAZ)	Pan Feng (CHN)	Suthep Wongsunthorn (THA)
1998 Bangkok	Yermakhan Ibraimov (KAZ)	Im Jung-bin (KOR)	Batmönkhiin Enkhbayar (MGL)
1998 Bangkok	Yermakhan Ibraimov (KAZ)	Im Jung-bin (KOR)	Komgrit Nanakon (THA)
2002 Busan	Gennady Golovkin (KAZ)	Suriya Prasathinphimai (THA)	Song In-joon (KOR)
2002 Busan	Gennady Golovkin (KAZ)	Suriya Prasathinphimai (THA)	Sirojiddin Naimov (UZB)
2022 Hangzhou	Sewon Okazawa (JPN)	Kan Chia-wei (TPE)	Aslanbek Shymbergenov (KAZ)
2022 Hangzhou	Sewon Okazawa (JPN)	Kan Chia-wei (TPE)	Baýramdurdy Nurmuhammedow (TKM)
2026 Aichi–Nagoya	Torekhan Sabyrkhan (KAZ)	Zeyad Ishaish (JOR)	Sewon Okazawa (JPN)
2026 Aichi–Nagoya	Torekhan Sabyrkhan (KAZ)	Zeyad Ishaish (JOR)	Shavkatjon Boltaev (UZB)

=== Middleweight ===
- 75 kg: 1958–2018

Games	Gold	Silver	Bronze
1958 Tokyo	Chang Lo-pu (ROC)	Hari Singh Thapa (IND)	Leon Khachatourian (IRN)
1958 Tokyo	Chang Lo-pu (ROC)	Hari Singh Thapa (IND)	Shoichi Matsuura (JPN)
1962 Jakarta	Kim Duk-pal (KOR)	Gul Muhammad (PAK)	Alex Abast (INA)
1962 Jakarta	Kim Duk-pal (KOR)	Gul Muhammad (PAK)	Surendra Sarkar (IND)
1966 Bangkok	Seiichi Sato (JPN)	Lee Kum-taik (KOR)	Bernardo Belleza (PHI)
1966 Bangkok	Seiichi Sato (JPN)	Lee Kum-taik (KOR)	Chaiyoot Thuito (THA)
1970 Bangkok	Wiem Gommies (INA)	Arif Malik (PAK)	Gholam Hossein Pakmanesh (IRN)
1970 Bangkok	Wiem Gommies (INA)	Arif Malik (PAK)	Nipon Oraisri (THA)
1974 Tehran	Kim Sung-chul (KOR)	Major Singh (IND)	Vartex Parsanian (IRN)
1974 Tehran	Kim Sung-chul (KOR)	Major Singh (IND)	Habib-ur-Rehman (PAK)
1978 Bangkok	Wiem Gommies (INA)	Jang Bong-mun (PRK)	Park Young-kyu (KOR)
1978 Bangkok	Wiem Gommies (INA)	Jang Bong-mun (PRK)	D. Erdenee (MGL)
1982 New Delhi	Lee Nam-eui (KOR)	Rajendra Kumar Puneda (IND)	Ahmad Al-Rabee (KUW)
1982 New Delhi	Lee Nam-eui (KOR)	Rajendra Kumar Puneda (IND)	Muzaffar Ahmed (PAK)
1986 Seoul	Shin Joon-sup (KOR)	Narong Inphrom (THA)	Manjit Pal Singh (IND)
1986 Seoul	Shin Joon-sup (KOR)	Narong Inphrom (THA)	Sushil Pokhrel (NEP)
1990 Beijing	Pino Bahari (INA)	Bandiin Altangerel (MGL)	Liu Xinjun (CHN)
1990 Beijing	Pino Bahari (INA)	Bandiin Altangerel (MGL)	Siamak Varzideh (IRN)
1994 Hiroshima	Lee Seung-bae (KOR)	Arkadiy Topayev (KAZ)	Chen Tao (CHN)
1994 Hiroshima	Lee Seung-bae (KOR)	Arkadiy Topayev (KAZ)	Dilshod Yarbekov (UZB)
1998 Bangkok	Vyacheslav Burba (KAZ)	Dilshod Yarbekov (UZB)	Kim Ho-chul (KOR)
1998 Bangkok	Vyacheslav Burba (KAZ)	Dilshod Yarbekov (UZB)	Mohammad Kaddour (SYR)
2002 Busan	Utkirbek Haydarov (UZB)	Ahmed Ali Khan (PAK)	Baurzhan Kairmenov (KAZ)
2002 Busan	Utkirbek Haydarov (UZB)	Ahmed Ali Khan (PAK)	Moon Young-seung (KOR)
2006 Doha	Elshod Rasulov (UZB)	Bakhtiyar Artayev (KAZ)	Zhang Jianting (CHN)
2006 Doha	Elshod Rasulov (UZB)	Bakhtiyar Artayev (KAZ)	Vijender Singh (IND)
2010 Guangzhou	Vijender Singh (IND)	Abbos Atoev (UZB)	Mohammad Sattarpour (IRI)
2010 Guangzhou	Vijender Singh (IND)	Abbos Atoev (UZB)	Danabek Suzhanov (KAZ)
2014 Incheon	Zhanibek Alimkhanuly (KAZ)	Odai Al-Hindawi (JOR)	Vikas Krishan Yadav (IND)
2014 Incheon	Zhanibek Alimkhanuly (KAZ)	Odai Al-Hindawi (JOR)	Wilfredo Lopez (PHI)
2018 Jakarta–Palembang	Israil Madrimov (UZB)	Abilkhan Amankul (KAZ)	Vikas Krishan Yadav (IND)
2018 Jakarta–Palembang	Israil Madrimov (UZB)	Abilkhan Amankul (KAZ)	Eumir Marcial (PHI)

=== Light heavyweight ===
- 81 kg: 1958–2014
- 80 kg: 2022–

Games	Gold	Silver	Bronze
1958 Tokyo	Shuichi Nakayama (JPN)	Sultan Mahmood (PAK)	Akbar Khojini (IRN)
1958 Tokyo	Shuichi Nakayama (JPN)	Sultan Mahmood (PAK)	None awarded
1962 Jakarta	Muhammad Safdar (PAK)	Paruhum Siregar (INA)	Tetsuya Arita (JPN)
1962 Jakarta	Muhammad Safdar (PAK)	Paruhum Siregar (INA)	None awarded
1966 Bangkok	Kim Duk-pal (KOR)	Chaliew Chandramanee (THA)	Aloush Abbasi (IRN)
1966 Bangkok	Kim Duk-pal (KOR)	Chaliew Chandramanee (THA)	Barkat Ali (PAK)
1970 Bangkok	Marnit Triarooniaks (THA)	Park Hyung-choon (KOR)	Rudy Siregar (INA)
1970 Bangkok	Marnit Triarooniaks (THA)	Park Hyung-choon (KOR)	Khizar Hayat (PAK)
1974 Tehran	Masis Hambarsumian (IRN)	Mehtab Singh (IND)	Khalid Hussain (PAK)
1974 Tehran	Masis Hambarsumian (IRN)	Mehtab Singh (IND)	None awarded
1978 Bangkok	Iqbal Muhammad (PAK)	Kim Nam-hee (KOR)	Benny Maniani (INA)
1978 Bangkok	Iqbal Muhammad (PAK)	Kim Nam-hee (KOR)	Sangob Wichensan (THA)
1982 New Delhi	Hong Ki-ho (KOR)	Girwar Singh (IND)	Habibullah Khan (PAK)
1982 New Delhi	Hong Ki-ho (KOR)	Girwar Singh (IND)	Ri Un-yong (PRK)
1986 Seoul	Min Byung-yong (KOR)	Hussain Shah (PAK)	Mosharraf Hossain (BAN)
1986 Seoul	Min Byung-yong (KOR)	Hussain Shah (PAK)	Dhan Bahadur Gurung (IND)
1990 Beijing	Bai Chongguang (CHN)	Ali Asghar Kazemi (IRN)	Hong Ki-ho (KOR)
1990 Beijing	Bai Chongguang (CHN)	Ali Asghar Kazemi (IRN)	Asghar Ali Changezi (PAK)
1994 Hiroshima	Ayoub Pourtaghi (IRI)	Ko Young-sam (KOR)	Lakha Singh (IND)
1994 Hiroshima	Ayoub Pourtaghi (IRI)	Ko Young-sam (KOR)	Vassiliy Zhirov (KAZ)
1998 Bangkok	Sergey Mihaylov (UZB)	Lee Seung-bae (KOR)	Gurcharan Singh (IND)
1998 Bangkok	Sergey Mihaylov (UZB)	Lee Seung-bae (KOR)	Shaukat Ali (PAK)
2002 Busan	Ikrom Berdiev (UZB)	Choi Ki-soo (KOR)	Aleksey Katulevsky (KGZ)
2002 Busan	Ikrom Berdiev (UZB)	Choi Ki-soo (KOR)	Munir Abukeshek (PLE)
2006 Doha	Jahon Qurbonov (TJK)	Song Hak-sung (KOR)	Mehdi Ghorbani (IRI)
2006 Doha	Jahon Qurbonov (TJK)	Song Hak-sung (KOR)	Huzam Nabaah (QAT)
2010 Guangzhou	Elshod Rasulov (UZB)	Dinesh Kumar (IND)	Meng Fanlong (CHN)
2010 Guangzhou	Elshod Rasulov (UZB)	Dinesh Kumar (IND)	Deepak Maharjan (NEP)
2014 Incheon	Adilbek Niyazymbetov (KAZ)	Kim Hyeong-kyu (KOR)	Ehsan Rouzbahani (IRI)
2014 Incheon	Adilbek Niyazymbetov (KAZ)	Kim Hyeong-kyu (KOR)	Oybek Mamazulunov (UZB)
2022 Hangzhou	Tuohetaerbieke Tanglatihan (CHN)	Eumir Marcial (PHI)	Ahmad Ghossoun (SYR)
2022 Hangzhou	Tuohetaerbieke Tanglatihan (CHN)	Eumir Marcial (PHI)	Turabek Khabibullaev (UZB)
2026 Aichi–Nagoya	Ankush Panghal (IND)	Kim Min-seong (KOR)	Hussein Ishaish (JOR)
2026 Aichi–Nagoya	Ankush Panghal (IND)	Kim Min-seong (KOR)	Fazliddin Erkinboev (UZB)

=== Heavyweight ===
- +81 kg: 1958–1978
- 91 kg: 1982–2014
- 92 kg: 2022
- 90 kg: 2026–

Games	Gold	Silver	Bronze
1958 Tokyo	Shunzo Nishio (JPN)	Khalid Mumtaz (PAK)	None awarded
1958 Tokyo	Shunzo Nishio (JPN)	Khalid Mumtaz (PAK)	None awarded
1962 Jakarta	Barkat Ali (PAK)	None awarded	None awarded
1962 Jakarta	Barkat Ali (PAK)	None awarded	None awarded
1966 Bangkok	Hawa Singh (IND)	Abdul Rehman (PAK)	Hossein Fathianpour (IRN)
1966 Bangkok	Hawa Singh (IND)	Abdul Rehman (PAK)	Lee Chun-in (KOR)
1970 Bangkok	Hawa Singh (IND)	Omran Khatami (IRN)	Kim Sang-man (KOR)
1970 Bangkok	Hawa Singh (IND)	Omran Khatami (IRN)	Sowar Shah (PAK)
1974 Tehran	Abdolreza Andaveh (IRN)	Til Bahadur Bura (IND)	Sowar Shah (PAK)
1974 Tehran	Abdolreza Andaveh (IRN)	Til Bahadur Bura (IND)	None awarded
1978 Bangkok	Imtiaz Mahmood (PAK)	Brij Mohan Sharma (IND)	Krismanto (INA)
1978 Bangkok	Imtiaz Mahmood (PAK)	Brij Mohan Sharma (IND)	Kim Ki-choon (KOR)
1982 New Delhi	Kaur Singh (IND)	Ismail Khalil (IRQ)	So Bae-won (KOR)
1982 New Delhi	Kaur Singh (IND)	Ismail Khalil (IRQ)	Sambuugiin Khicheengui (MGL)
1986 Seoul	Kim Yoo-hyun (KOR)	Daljit Singh (IND)	Montaser Shuaib (KUW)
1986 Seoul	Kim Yoo-hyun (KOR)	Daljit Singh (IND)	Kausar Abbas (PAK)
1990 Beijing	Chae Sung-bae (KOR)	Wang Weixiong (CHN)	Damdinbazaryn Ganzorig (MGL)
1990 Beijing	Chae Sung-bae (KOR)	Wang Weixiong (CHN)	Muhammad Sahib (PAK)
1994 Hiroshima	Alisher Avezbaev (UZB)	Yousef Hawsawi (KSA)	Jiang Tao (CHN)
1994 Hiroshima	Alisher Avezbaev (UZB)	Yousef Hawsawi (KSA)	Bahman Azizpour (IRI)
1998 Bangkok	Ruslan Chagaev (UZB)	Muzaffar Iqbal Mirza (PAK)	Rouhollah Hosseini (IRI)
1998 Bangkok	Ruslan Chagaev (UZB)	Muzaffar Iqbal Mirza (PAK)	Mohammad Abukhadijeh (JOR)
2002 Busan	Sergey Mihaylov (UZB)	Shaukat Ali (PAK)	Lee Hyun-sung (KOR)
2002 Busan	Sergey Mihaylov (UZB)	Shaukat Ali (PAK)	Nasser Al-Shami (SYR)
2006 Doha	Ali Mazaheri (IRI)	Jasur Matchanov (UZB)	Dmitriy Gotfrid (KAZ)
2006 Doha	Ali Mazaheri (IRI)	Jasur Matchanov (UZB)	Nasser Al-Shami (SYR)
2010 Guangzhou	Mohammad Ghossoun (SYR)	Manpreet Singh (IND)	Ali Mazaheri (IRI)
2010 Guangzhou	Mohammad Ghossoun (SYR)	Manpreet Singh (IND)	Jahon Qurbonov (TJK)
2014 Incheon	Anton Pinchuk (KAZ)	Ali Mazaheri (IRI)	Ihab Al-Matbouli (JOR)
2014 Incheon	Anton Pinchuk (KAZ)	Ali Mazaheri (IRI)	Park Nam-hyeong (KOR)
2022 Hangzhou	Davlat Boltaev (TJK)	Han Xuezhen (CHN)	Sagyndyk Togambay (KAZ)
2022 Hangzhou	Davlat Boltaev (TJK)	Han Xuezhen (CHN)	Jeong Jae-min (KOR)
2026 Aichi–Nagoya	Turabek Khabibullaev (UZB)	Han Xuezhen (CHN)	Kapil Pokhariya (IND)
2026 Aichi–Nagoya	Turabek Khabibullaev (UZB)	Han Xuezhen (CHN)	Parviz Karimov (TJK)

=== Super heavyweight ===
- +91 kg: 1982–2014
- +92 kg: 2022
- +90 kg: 2026–

Games	Gold	Silver	Bronze
1982 New Delhi	Cho Bong-gil (PRK)	Imtiaz Mahmood (PAK)	Kim Hyun-ho (KOR)
1982 New Delhi	Cho Bong-gil (PRK)	Imtiaz Mahmood (PAK)	Naiem Shumais (KUW)
1986 Seoul	Baik Hyun-man (KOR)	Jaipal Singh (IND)	Tul Bahadur Thapa (NEP)
1986 Seoul	Baik Hyun-man (KOR)	Jaipal Singh (IND)	Muhammad Yousaf (PAK)
1990 Beijing	Baik Hyun-man (KOR)	Zhao Deling (CHN)	Iraj Kiarostami (IRN)
1990 Beijing	Baik Hyun-man (KOR)	Zhao Deling (CHN)	Dildar Ahmed (PAK)
1994 Hiroshima	Oleg Maskaev (UZB)	Mohammad Reza Samadi (IRI)	Raj Kumar Sangwan (IND)
1994 Hiroshima	Oleg Maskaev (UZB)	Mohammad Reza Samadi (IRI)	Safarish Khan (PAK)
1998 Bangkok	Mukhtarkhan Dildabekov (KAZ)	Mohammad Reza Samadi (IRI)	Shahid Hussain (PAK)
1998 Bangkok	Mukhtarkhan Dildabekov (KAZ)	Mohammad Reza Samadi (IRI)	Lazizbek Zokirov (UZB)
2002 Busan	Rustam Saidov (UZB)	Mukhtarkhan Dildabekov (KAZ)	Zhang Junlong (CHN)
2002 Busan	Rustam Saidov (UZB)	Mukhtarkhan Dildabekov (KAZ)	Muzaffar Iqbal Mirza (PAK)
2006 Doha	Rustam Saidov (UZB)	Mukhtarkhan Dildabekov (KAZ)	Varghese Johnson (IND)
2006 Doha	Rustam Saidov (UZB)	Mukhtarkhan Dildabekov (KAZ)	Jasem Delavari (IRI)
2010 Guangzhou	Zhang Zhilei (CHN)	Ivan Dychko (KAZ)	Paramjeet Samota (IND)
2010 Guangzhou	Zhang Zhilei (CHN)	Ivan Dychko (KAZ)	Rouhollah Hosseini (IRI)
2014 Incheon	Ivan Dychko (KAZ)	Jasem Delavari (IRI)	Satish Kumar (IND)
2014 Incheon	Ivan Dychko (KAZ)	Jasem Delavari (IRI)	Mirzohid Abdullaev (UZB)
2022 Hangzhou	Bakhodir Jalolov (UZB)	Kamshybek Kunkabayev (KAZ)	Bayikewuzi Danabieke (CHN)
2022 Hangzhou	Bakhodir Jalolov (UZB)	Kamshybek Kunkabayev (KAZ)	Narender Berwal (IND)
2026 Aichi–Nagoya	Aibek Oralbay (KAZ)	Jakhongir Zokirov (UZB)	Narender Berwal (IND)
2026 Aichi–Nagoya	Aibek Oralbay (KAZ)	Jakhongir Zokirov (UZB)	Amir Esmaeili (IRI)

== Women ==
=== Light flyweight ===
- 50 kg: 2022

Games	Gold	Silver	Bronze
2022 Hangzhou	Wu Yu (CHN)	Chuthamat Raksat (THA)	Nikhat Zareen (IND)
2022 Hangzhou	Wu Yu (CHN)	Chuthamat Raksat (THA)	Oyuntsetsegiin Yesügen (MGL)

=== Flyweight ===
- 51 kg: 2010–

Games	Gold	Silver	Bronze
2010 Guangzhou	Ren Cancan (CHN)	Annie Albania (PHI)	Mary Kom (IND)
2010 Guangzhou	Ren Cancan (CHN)	Annie Albania (PHI)	Aya Shinmoto (JPN)
2014 Incheon	Mary Kom (IND)	Zhaina Shekerbekova (KAZ)	Myagmardulamyn Nandintsetseg (MGL)
2014 Incheon	Mary Kom (IND)	Zhaina Shekerbekova (KAZ)	Lê Thị Bằng (VIE)
2018 Jakarta–Palembang	Chang Yuan (CHN)	Pang Chol-mi (PRK)	Lin Yu-ting (TPE)
2018 Jakarta–Palembang	Chang Yuan (CHN)	Pang Chol-mi (PRK)	Nguyễn Thị Tâm (VIE)
2026 Aichi–Nagoya	Wu Yu (CHN)	Nguyễn Thị Tâm (VIE)	Alua Balkibekova (KAZ)
2026 Aichi–Nagoya	Wu Yu (CHN)	Nguyễn Thị Tâm (VIE)	Feruza Kazakova (UZB)

=== Bantamweight ===
- 54 kg: 2022–

Games	Gold	Silver	Bronze
2022 Hangzhou	Pang Chol-mi (PRK)	Chang Yuan (CHN)	Preeti Pawar (IND)
2022 Hangzhou	Pang Chol-mi (PRK)	Chang Yuan (CHN)	Nigina Uktamova (UZB)
2026 Aichi–Nagoya	Natnicha Chongprongklang (THA)	Pang Chol-mi (PRK)	Zhao Xuan (CHN)
2026 Aichi–Nagoya	Natnicha Chongprongklang (THA)	Pang Chol-mi (PRK)	Tsukimi Namiki (JPN)

=== Featherweight ===
- 57 kg: 2018–2022

Games	Gold	Silver	Bronze
2018 Jakarta–Palembang	Yin Junhua (CHN)	Jo Son-hwa (PRK)	Nilawan Techasuep (THA)
2018 Jakarta–Palembang	Yin Junhua (CHN)	Jo Son-hwa (PRK)	Huang Hsiao-wen (TPE)
2022 Hangzhou	Lin Yu-ting (TPE)	Karina Ibragimova (KAZ)	Mijgona Samadova (TJK)
2022 Hangzhou	Lin Yu-ting (TPE)	Karina Ibragimova (KAZ)	None awarded

=== Lightweight ===
- 60 kg: 2010–

Games	Gold	Silver	Bronze
2010 Guangzhou	Dong Cheng (CHN)	Tassamalee Thongjan (THA)	Saida Khassenova (KAZ)
2010 Guangzhou	Dong Cheng (CHN)	Tassamalee Thongjan (THA)	Yun Kum-ju (PRK)
2014 Incheon	Yin Junhua (CHN)	Park Jin-a (KOR)	Laishram Sarita Devi (IND)
2014 Incheon	Yin Junhua (CHN)	Park Jin-a (KOR)	Lừu Thị Duyên (VIE)
2018 Jakarta–Palembang	Oh Yeon-ji (KOR)	Sudaporn Seesondee (THA)	Huswatun Hasanah (INA)
2018 Jakarta–Palembang	Oh Yeon-ji (KOR)	Sudaporn Seesondee (THA)	Choe Hye-song (PRK)
2022 Hangzhou	Yang Wenlu (CHN)	Won Un-gyong (PRK)	Thananya Somnuek (THA)
2022 Hangzhou	Yang Wenlu (CHN)	Won Un-gyong (PRK)	Wu Shih-yi (TPE)
2026 Aichi–Nagoya	Lin Yu-ting (TPE)	Yang Chengyu (CHN)	Priya Ghanghas (IND)
2026 Aichi–Nagoya	Lin Yu-ting (TPE)	Yang Chengyu (CHN)	Sitora Turdibekova (UZB)

=== Welterweight ===
- 66 kg: 2022
- 65 kg: 2026–

Games	Gold	Silver	Bronze
2022 Hangzhou	Yang Liu (CHN)	Janjaem Suwannapheng (THA)	Natalya Bogdanova (KAZ)
2022 Hangzhou	Yang Liu (CHN)	Janjaem Suwannapheng (THA)	Chen Nien-chin (TPE)
2026 Aichi–Nagoya	Parveen Hooda (IND)	Chen Nien-chin (TPE)	Li Shu (CHN)
2026 Aichi–Nagoya	Parveen Hooda (IND)	Chen Nien-chin (TPE)	Hwang Hyo-sun (PRK)

=== Middleweight ===
- 75 kg: 2010–

Games	Gold	Silver	Bronze
2010 Guangzhou	Li Jinzi (CHN)	Erdenesoyolyn Undram (MGL)	Kavita Goyat (IND)
2010 Guangzhou	Li Jinzi (CHN)	Erdenesoyolyn Undram (MGL)	Seong Su-yeon (KOR)
2014 Incheon	Jang Un-hui (PRK)	Li Qian (CHN)	Pooja Rani (IND)
2014 Incheon	Jang Un-hui (PRK)	Li Qian (CHN)	Marina Volnova (KAZ)
2022 Hangzhou	Li Qian (CHN)	Lovlina Borgohain (IND)	Baison Manikon (THA)
2022 Hangzhou	Li Qian (CHN)	Lovlina Borgohain (IND)	Lưu Diễm Quỳnh (VIE)
2026 Aichi–Nagoya	Lovlina Borgohain (IND)	Bao Ziyi (CHN)	Natalya Bogdanova (KAZ)
2026 Aichi–Nagoya	Lovlina Borgohain (IND)	Bao Ziyi (CHN)	Lưu Diễm Quỳnh (VIE)
