= Boxing at the 1986 Asian Games – Men's 60 kg =

Men's 60 kg at the 1986 Asian Games
- Venue: Jamsil Students' Gymnasium
- Date: 26 September – 4 October 1986
- Competitors: 9 from 9 nations

Medalists
gold medal	Kwon Hyun-kyu	South Korea
silver medal	Leopoldo Cantancio	Philippines
bronze medal	Dal Bahadur Ranamagar	Nepal
bronze medal	Wanchai Pongsri	Thailand

The men's lightweight (60 kilograms) event at the 1986 Asian Games took place from 26 September to 4 October 1986 at Jamsil Students' Gymnasium, Seoul, South Korea.

A boxer may win by knockout or by points. Scoring is on the "10-point-must," with 5 judges scoring each round. The boxer with the higher score from a majority of the judges is the winner.

== Schedule ==
All times are Korea Standard Time (UTC+09:00)

Date	Time	Event
Friday, 26 September 1986	15:00	1st round
Monday, 29 September 1986	15:00	Quarterfinals
Thursday, 2 October 1986	15:00	Semifinals
Saturday, 4 October 1986	15:00	Final

== Results ==
Legend

- KO — Won by knockout
- RSCH — Won by referee stop contest head blow
- RSCI — Won by referee stop contest injury

1st round
Leopoldo Cantancio (PHI)	RSCH
Matheos Lewaherilla (INA)

Quarterfinals
Kwon Hyun-kyu (KOR)	5
Takeyuki Akagi (JPN)	0
Samir Qasim (IRQ)
Dal Bahadur Ranamagar (NEP)	RSCI
Wanchai Pongsri (THA)	4
Babar Ali Khan (PAK)	1
Dhanapal Mathivanan (IND)
Leopoldo Cantancio (PHI)	KO

Semifinals
Kwon Hyun-kyu (KOR)	KO
Dal Bahadur Ranamagar (NEP)
Wanchai Pongsri (THA)
Leopoldo Cantancio (PHI)	KO

Final
Kwon Hyun-kyu (KOR)	5
Leopoldo Cantancio (PHI)	0
