= Boxing at the 1986 Asian Games – Men's 57 kg =

Boxing competitions

Men's 57 kg at the 1986 Asian Games
- Venue: Jamsil Students' Gymnasium
- Date: 27 September – 4 October 1986
- Competitors: 8 from 8 nations

Medalists
gold medal	Park Hyeong-ok	South Korea
silver medal	Adrianus Taroreh	Indonesia
bronze medal	Toshiyasu Kiyosawa	Japan
bronze medal	John Williams	India

The men's featherweight (57 kilograms) event at the 1986 Asian Games took place from 27 September to 4 October 1986 at Jamsil Students' Gymnasium, Seoul, South Korea.

A boxer may win by knockout or by points. Scoring is on the "10-point-must," with 5 judges scoring each round. The boxer with the higher score from a majority of the judges is the winner.

== Schedule ==
All times are Korea Standard Time (UTC+09:00)

Date	Time	Event
Saturday, 27 September 1986	15:00	Quarterfinals
Wednesday, 1 October 1986	15:00	Semifinals
Saturday, 4 October 1986	15:00	Final

== Results ==
Legend

- RET — Won by retirement
- RSCH — Won by referee stop contest head blow

Quarterfinals
Adel Abdullah (KUW)
Toshiyasu Kiyosawa (JPN)	RET
Park Hyeong-ok (KOR)	5
Sukhum Nobnom (THA)	0
Prakash Dhar Tuladhar (NEP)	0
John Williams (IND)	5
Adrianus Taroreh (INA)	RSCH
Naseer Ahmed (PAK)

Semifinals
Toshiyasu Kiyosawa (JPN)	0
Park Hyeong-ok (KOR)	5
John Williams (IND)	0
Adrianus Taroreh (INA)	5

Final
Park Hyeong-ok (KOR)	5
Adrianus Taroreh (INA)	0
