= Boxing at the 1986 Asian Games – Men's 67 kg =

Boxing competitions

Men's 67 kg at the 1986 Asian Games
- Venue: Jamsil Students' Gymnasium
- Date: 27 September – 4 October 1986
- Competitors: 7 from 7 nations

Medalists
gold medal	Kim Dong-kil	South Korea
silver medal	Sumruay Mongsont	Thailand
bronze medal	Gopal Dewang	India
bronze medal	Kunihiro Miura	Japan

The men's welterweight (67 kilograms) event at the 1986 Asian Games took place from 27 September to 4 October 1986 at Jamsil Students' Gymnasium, Seoul, South Korea.

A boxer may win by knockout or by points. Scoring is on the "10-point-must," with 5 judges scoring each round. The boxer with the higher score from a majority of the judges is the winner.

== Schedule ==
All times are Korea Standard Time (UTC+09:00)

Date	Time	Event
Saturday, 27 September 1986	15:00	Quarterfinals
Thursday, 2 October 1986	15:00	Semifinals
Saturday, 4 October 1986	15:00	Final

== Results ==
Legend

- KO — Won by knockout
- RSCH — Won by referee stop contest head blow
- WO — Won by walkover

Quarterfinals
Gopal Dewang (IND)	5
Albert Papilaya (INA)	0
Kim Dong-kil (KOR)	RSCH
Muhammad Khalid (PAK)
Kunihiro Miura (JPN)	KO
Jhapat Singh Bhujel (NEP)

Semifinals
Sumruay Mongsont (THA)	5
Gopal Dewang (IND)	0
Kim Dong-kil (KOR)	5
Kunihiro Miura (JPN)	0

Final
Sumruay Mongsont (THA)
Kim Dong-kil (KOR)	WO
