= Boxing at the 1986 Asian Games – Men's 71 kg =

Boxing competitions

Men's 71 kg at the 1986 Asian Games
- Venue: Jamsil Students' Gymnasium
- Date: 26 September – 4 October 1986
- Competitors: 8 from 8 nations

Medalists
| gold medal | Lee Hae-jung | South Korea |
| silver medal | Chiharu Ogiwara | Japan |
| bronze medal | Ernesto Coronel | Philippines |
| bronze medal | Abrar Hussain | Pakistan |

The men's light middleweight (71 kilograms) event at the 1986 Asian Games took place from 26 September to 4 October 1986 at Jamsil Students' Gymnasium, Seoul, South Korea.

A boxer may win by knockout or by points. Scoring is on the "10-point-must," with 5 judges scoring each round. The boxer with the higher score from a majority of the judges is the winner.

== Schedule ==
All times are Korea Standard Time (UTC+09:00)

| Date | Time | Event |
|---|---|---|
| Friday, 26 September 1986 | 15:00 | Quarterfinals |
| Wednesday, 1 October 1986 | 15:00 | Semifinals |
| Saturday, 4 October 1986 | 15:00 | Final |

== Results ==
Legend

- DSQ — Won by disqualification
- RET — Won by retirement
- RSCH — Won by referee stop contest head blow
- RSCI — Won by referee stop contest injury

Quarterfinals
Baqer Fahad (KUW)
Ernesto Coronel (PHI) | DSQ
Chiharu Ogiwara (JPN) | RSCH
Chitra Bahadur Rana (IND)
Lee Hae-jung (KOR) | RSCH
Winai Polyium (THA)
Abrar Hussain (PAK) | RET
K. C. Bhim (NEP)

Semifinals
Ernesto Coronel (PHI)
Chiharu Ogiwara (JPN) | RSCH
Lee Hae-jung (KOR) | 5
Abrar Hussain (PAK) | 0

Final
Chiharu Ogiwara (JPN)
Lee Hae-jung (KOR) | RSCI
