= Badminton at the 1986 Asian Games – Men's singles =

Men's singles at the 1986 Asian Games
- Venue: Olympic Gymnastics Arena
- Dates: 30 September – 4 October
- Competitors: 18 from 10 nations

Medalists
gold medal	Zhao Jianhua	China
silver medal	Yang Yang	China
bronze medal	Sung Han-kook	South Korea
bronze medal	Park Sung-bae	South Korea

The badminton men's singles tournament at the 1986 Asian Games in Seoul took place from 30 September to 4 October.

== Schedule ==
All times are Korea Standard Time (UTC+09:00)

Date	Time	Event
30 September	11:00	First round
30 September	11:00	Second round
1 October	11:00	Second round
2 October	11:00	Quarter-finals
3 October	11:00	Semi-finals
4 October	11:00	Final

== Results ==
=== Finals ===
Semi-finals
1	Yang Yang (CHN)	15	17
5/8	Sung Han-kook (KOR)	7	14
5/8	Park Sung-bae (KOR)	14	1
2	Zhao Jianhua (CHN)	17	15

Final
1	Yang Yang (CHN)	9	16
2	Zhao Jianhua (CHN)	15	17

=== Top half ===
==== Section 1 ====
First round

Second round
1	Yang Y (CHN)	15	15
Lee T S (HKG)	4	2
5/8	H Nishiyama (JPN)	7	3
P Padukone (IND)	15	15

Quarter-finals
1	Yang Y (CHN)	15	15
P Padukone (IND)	3	9

==== Section 2 ====
First round
N Wijekoon (SRI)	15	15
P Dhoj Rana (NEP)	11	12

Second round
3/4	M Sidek (MAL)	15	15	13
E Kurniawan (INA)	9	17	15
5/8	Sung H-k (KOR)	15	15
N Wijekoon (SRI)	5	5

Quarter-finals
E Kurniawan (INA)	4	15
5/8	Sung H-k (KOR)	15	17

=== Bottom half ===
==== Section 3 ====
First round
U. Vimal Kumar (IND)	10	12
S Matsuura (JPN)	15	15

Second round
S Matsuura (JPN)	11	10
5/8	Park S-b (KOR)	15	15
S Kukasemkij (THA)	10	12
3/4	I Sugiarto (INA)	15	15

Quarter-finals
5/8	Park S-b (KOR)	13	15	8
3/4	I Sugiarto (INA)	15	11	6^{r}

==== Section 4 ====
First round

Second round
P Adhikari (NEP)	6	6
5/8	Foo K K (MAL)	15	15
Yeung Y K (HKG)	9	8
2	Zhao JH (CHN)	15	15

Quarter-finals
5/8	Foo K K (MAL)	7	9
2	Zhao JH (CHN)	15	15
