= Badminton at the 1986 Asian Games – Women's doubles =

Women's doubles at the 1986 Asian Games
- Venue: Olympic Gymnastics Arena
- Dates: 1–4 October
- Competitors: 30 from 9 nations

Medalists
gold medal	Lin Ying; Guan Weizhen	China
silver medal	Kim Yun-ja; Yoo Sang-hee	South Korea
bronze medal	Rosiana Tendean; Imelda Wiguna	Indonesia
bronze medal	Kimiko Jinnai; Sumiko Kitada	Japan

The badminton women's doubles tournament at the 1986 Asian Games in Olympic Gymnastics Arena, Seoul, South Korea took place from 1 October to 4 October.

15 teams from 9 nations entered for the tournament and the Chinese duo of Lin Ying and Guan Weizhen won the gold in this tournament. with a three-set victory over Korea's Kim Yun-ja and Yoo Sang-hee. Japan and Indonesia shared the bronze medal after losing in the semifinal.

== Schedule ==
All times are Korea Standard Time (UTC+09:00)

Date	Time	Event
1 October	11:00	First round
2 October	11:00	Quarter-finals
3 October	11:00	Semi-finals
4 October	11:00	Final

== Results ==
1st round
Hufrish Nariman (IND); Mallika Barua (IND)	15	15
Chhanya Shrestha (NEP); Kalpana Rana (NEP)	7	2
3/4	Zheng Yuli (CHN); Gu Jiaming (CHN)	6	17	14
Atsuko Tokuda (JPN); Yoshiko Yonekura (JPN)	15	15	17
Rosiana Tendean (INA); Imelda Wiguna (INA)	15	15
Tong Chun Mui (HKG); Amy Chan (HKG)	4	6
Kimiko Jinnai (JPN); Sumiko Kitada (JPN)	15	15
Tania Shah (PAK); Ghazala Wadood (PAK)	1	1
Ami Ghia (IND); Madhumita Bisht (IND)	15	3
3/4	Verawaty Fadjrin (INA); Ivana Lie (INA)	17	15
Reema Shrestha (NEP); Rajani Joshi (NEP)	0	1
Chung Myung-hee (KOR); Hwang Hye-young (KOR)	15	15
Darunee Lertvoralak (THA); Ladawan Mulasartsatorn (THA)	7	3
2	Lin Ying (CHN); Guan Weizhen (CHN)	15	15

Quarterfinals
1	Kim Yun-ja (KOR); Yoo Sang-hee (KOR)	15	15
Hufrish Nariman (IND); Mallika Barua (IND)	0	2
Atsuko Tokuda (JPN); Yoshiko Yonekura (JPN)	2	4
Rosiana Tendean (INA); Imelda Wiguna (INA)	15	15
Kimiko Jinnai (JPN); Sumiko Kitada (JPN)	15	15
3/4	Verawaty Fadjrin (INA); Ivana Lie (INA)	9	12
Chung Myung-hee (KOR); Hwang Hye-young (KOR)	15	5
2	Lin Ying (CHN); Guan Weizhen (CHN)	17	15

Semifinals
1	Kim Yun-ja (KOR); Yoo Sang-hee (KOR)	15	15
Rosiana Tendean (INA); Imelda Wiguna (INA)	12	13
Kimiko Jinnai (JPN); Sumiko Kitada (JPN)	2	1
2	Lin Ying (CHN); Guan Weizhen (CHN)	15	15

Finals
1	Kim Yun-ja (KOR); Yoo Sang-hee (KOR)	9	15	10
2	Lin Ying (CHN); Guan Weizhen (CHN)	15	8	15
