= Boxing at the 1986 Asian Games – Men's 51 kg =

Boxing competitions

Men's 51 kg at the 1986 Asian Games
- Venue: Jamsil Students' Gymnasium
- Date: 26 September – 4 October 1986
- Competitors: 10 from 10 nations

Medalists
| gold medal | Kim Kwang-sun | South Korea |
| silver medal | Shahuraj Birajdar | India |
| bronze medal | Kwanchai Samrangit | Thailand |
| bronze medal | Muhammad Latif | Pakistan |

The men's flyweight (51 kilograms) event at the 1986 Asian Games took place from 26 September to 4 October 1986 at Jamsil Students' Gymnasium, Seoul, South Korea.

A boxer may win by knockout or by points. Scoring is on the "10-point-must," with 5 judges scoring each round. Judges consider "number of blows landed on the target areas, domination of the bout, technique and tactical superiority and competitiveness." Each judge determines a winner for each round, who receives 10 points for the round, and assigns the round's loser a number of points between 7 and 9 based on performance. The judge's scores for each round are added to give a total score for that judge. The boxer with the higher score from a majority of the judges is the winner.

== Schedule ==
All times are Korea Standard Time (UTC+09:00)

| Date | Time | Event |
|---|---|---|
| Friday, 26 September 1986 | 15:00 | 1st round |
| Tuesday, 30 September 1986 | 15:00 | Quarterfinals |
| Thursday, 2 October 1986 | 15:00 | Semifinals |
| Saturday, 4 October 1986 | 15:00 | Final |

== Results ==
Legend

- KO — Won by knockout
- RET — Won by retirement
- RSCH — Won by referee stop contest head blow

1st round
Abbas Khalaf (IRQ) | 0
Orlando Tacuyan (PHI) | 5
Kim Kwang-sun (KOR) | 5
Seiki Segawa (JPN) | 0

Quarterfinals
Shahuraj Birajdar (IND) | RET
Jamal Al-Sayed (KUW)
P. L. J. Ratnasuriya (SRI)
Kwanchai Samrangit (THA) | RSCH
Muhammad Latif (PAK) | 3
Nil Bahadur Ranamagar (NEP) | 2
Orlando Tacuyan (PHI)
Kim Kwang-sun (KOR) | RSCH

Semifinals
Shahuraj Birajdar (IND) | RSCH
Kwanchai Samrangit (THA)
Muhammad Latif (PAK)
Kim Kwang-sun (KOR) | RSCH

Final
Shahuraj Birajdar (IND)
Kim Kwang-sun (KOR) | KO
