= Badminton at the 1986 Asian Games – Men's doubles =

Men's doubles at the 1986 Asian Games
- Venue: Olympic Gymnastics Arena
- Dates: 30 September – 4 October
- Competitors: 34 from 9 nations

Medalists
gold medal	Park Joo-bong; Kim Moon-soo	South Korea
silver medal	Tian Bingyi; Li Yongbo	China
bronze medal	Ding Qiqing; Chen Kang	China
bronze medal	Liem Swie King; Bobby Ertanto	Indonesia

The badminton men's doubles tournament at the 1986 Asian Games in Seoul took place from 30 September to 4 October.

== Schedule ==
All times are Korea Standard Time (UTC+09:00)

Date	Time	Event
30 September	11:00	First round
30 September	11:00	Second round
1 October	11:00	Second round
2 October	11:00	Quarter-finals
3 October	11:00	Semi-finals
4 October	11:00	Final

== Results ==
=== Finals ===
Semi-finals
1	Park Joo-bong (KOR); Kim Moon-soo (KOR)	15	15
Ding Qiqing (CHN); Chen Kang (CHN)	10	3
3/4	Liem Swie King (INA); Bobby Ertanto (INA)	6	9
2	Tian Bingyi (CHN); Li Yongbo (CHN)	15	15

Final
1	Park Joo-bong (KOR); Kim Moon-soo (KOR)	15	15
2	Tian Bingyi (CHN); Li Yongbo (CHN)	8	10

=== Top half ===
==== Section 1 ====
First round

Second round
1	Park J-b (KOR); Kim M-s (KOR)	15	15
R B Shrestha (NEP); K Chakradhar (NEP)	0	0
5/8	R Kunte (IND); U Pawar (IND)	15	15
Lee T S (HKG); Tsang T (HKG)	5	9

Quarter-finals
1	Park J-b (KOR); Kim M-s (KOR)	15	15
5/8	R Kunte (IND); U Pawar (IND)	6	0

==== Section 2 ====
First round
H Nishiyama (JPN); S Matsuura (JPN)	7	5
K Promsarin (THA); S Siripool (THA)	15	15

Second round
3/4	H Susanto (INA); E Hartono (INA)	6	15	5
Ding QQ (CHN); Chen K (CHN)	15	6	15
5/8	Raz Sidek (MAL); Cheah S K (MAL)	5	15	9
K Promsarin (THA); S Siripool (THA)	15	8	15

Quarter-finals
Ding QQ (CHN); Chen K (CHN)	15	15
K Promsarin (THA); S Siripool (THA)	1	11

=== Bottom half ===
==== Section 3 ====
First round

Second round
S Misra (IND); L D'Sa (IND)	8	11
5/8	T Inoue (JPN); S Miyamori (JPN)	15	15
Yeung Y K (HKG); Lai H (HKG)	1	3
3/4	Liem S K (INA); B Ertanto (INA)	15	15

Quarter-finals
5/8	T Inoue (JPN); S Miyamori (JPN)	7	10
3/4	Liem S K (INA); B Ertanto (INA)	15	15

==== Section 4 ====
First round

Second round
P Adhikari (NEP); P Dhoj Rana (NEP)	0	0
5/8	Lee D-c (KOR); Kim J-s (KOR)	15	15
Ras Sidek (MAL); Chong W K (MAL)	6	9
2	Tian BY (CHN); Li YB (CHN)	15	15

Quarter-finals
5/8	Lee D-c (KOR); Kim J-s (KOR)	11	16
2	Tian BY (CHN); Li YB (CHN)	15	18
