= Boxing at the 1986 Asian Games – Men's 54 kg =

Boxing competitions

Men's 54 kg at the 1986 Asian Games
- Venue: Jamsil Students' Gymnasium
- Date: 25 September – 4 October 1986
- Competitors: 8 from 8 nations

Medalists
gold medal	Moon Sung-kil	South Korea
silver medal	Sophon Sujarikul	Thailand
bronze medal	G. D. Kamble	India
bronze medal	Brix Flores	Philippines

The men's bantamweight (54 kilograms) event at the 1986 Asian Games took place from 25 September to 4 October 1986 at Jamsil Students' Gymnasium, Seoul, South Korea.

A boxer may win by knockout or by points. Scoring is on the "10-point-must," with 5 judges scoring each round. The boxer with the higher score from a majority of the judges is the winner.

== Schedule ==
All times are Korea Standard Time (UTC+09:00)

Date	Time	Event
Thursday, 25 September 1986	15:00	Quarterfinals
Wednesday, 1 October 1986	15:00	Semifinals
Saturday, 4 October 1986	15:00	Final

== Results ==
Legend

- RSCH — Won by referee stop contest head blow

Quarterfinals
G. D. Kamble (IND)	5
Ram Bahadur Giri (NEP)	0
Moon Sung-kil (KOR)	RSCH
Wataru Yamada (JPN)
Richard Muskanan (INA)	1
Brix Flores (PHI)	4
Sophon Sujarikul (THA)	5
Abdul Khaliq (PAK)	0

Semifinals
G. D. Kamble (IND)
Moon Sung-kil (KOR)	RSCH
Brix Flores (PHI)	0
Sophon Sujarikul (THA)	5

Final
Moon Sung-kil (KOR)	5
Sophon Sujarikul (THA)	0
