= Boxing at the 1986 Asian Games – Men's 63.5 kg =

Boxing competitions

Men's 63.5 kg at the 1986 Asian Games
- Venue: Jamsil Students' Gymnasium
- Date: 25 September – 4 October 1986
- Competitors: 6 from 6 nations

Medalists
gold medal	Kim Ki-taek	South Korea
silver medal	Seera Jayaram	India
bronze medal	Manoj Bahadur Shrestha	Nepal
bronze medal	Yoshiaki Takahashi	Japan

The men's light welterweight (63.5 kilograms) event at the 1986 Asian Games took place from 25 September to 4 October 1986 at Jamsil Students' Gymnasium, Seoul, South Korea.

A boxer may win by knockout or by points. Scoring is on the "10-point-must," with 5 judges scoring each round. The boxer with the higher score from a majority of the judges is the winner.

== Schedule ==
All times are Korea Standard Time (UTC+09:00)

Date	Time	Event
Thursday, 25 September 1986	15:00	Quarterfinals
Wednesday, 1 October 1986	15:00	Semifinals
Saturday, 4 October 1986	15:00	Final

== Results ==
Legend

- RSCH — Won by referee stop contest head blow

Quarterfinals
Manat Noiprang (THA)	2
Seera Jayaram (IND)	3
Yoshiaki Takahashi (JPN)	4
Francisco Tamana (PHI)	1

Semifinals
Manoj Bahadur Shrestha (NEP)
Kim Ki-taek (KOR)	RSCH
Seera Jayaram (IND)	5
Yoshiaki Takahashi (JPN)	0

Final
Kim Ki-taek (KOR)	5
Seera Jayaram (IND)	0
