= Boxing at the 1986 Asian Games – Men's 48 kg =

Boxing competitions

Men's 48 kg at the 1986 Asian Games
- Venue: Jamsil Students' Gymnasium
- Date: 25 September – 4 October 1986
- Competitors: 9 from 9 nations

Medalists
| gold medal | Oh Kwang-soo | South Korea |
| silver medal | Supap Boonrawd | Thailand |
| bronze medal | Mamoru Kuroiwa | Japan |
| bronze medal | Saad Shabbot | Iraq |

The men's light flyweight (48 kilograms) event at the 1986 Asian Games took place from 25 September to 4 October 1986 at Jamsil Students' Gymnasium, Seoul, South Korea.

A boxer may win by knockout or by points. Scoring is on the "10-point-must," with 5 judges scoring each round. Judges consider "number of blows landed on the target areas, domination of the bout, technique and tactical superiority and competitiveness." Each judge determines a winner for each round, who receives 10 points for the round, and assigns the round's loser a number of points between 7 and 9 based on performance. The judge's scores for each round are added to give a total score for that judge. The boxer with the higher score from a majority of the judges is the winner.

== Schedule ==
All times are Korea Standard Time (UTC+09:00)

| Date | Time | Event |
|---|---|---|
| Thursday, 25 September 1986 | 15:00 | 1st round |
| Sunday, 28 September 1986 | 15:00 | Quarterfinals |
| Wednesday, 1 October 1986 | 15:00 | Semifinals |
| Saturday, 4 October 1986 | 15:00 | Final |

== Results ==
Legend

- RET — Won by retirement
- RSCH — Won by referee stop contest head blow

1st round
Oh Kwang-soo (KOR) | 5
Manoj Pingale (IND) | 0

Quarterfinals
Supap Boonrawd (THA) | 5
Kazi Shahadat Hossain (BAN) | 0
Ghulam Hussain (PAK)
Mamoru Kuroiwa (JPN) | RET
Pushkardhoj Shahi (NEP)
Saad Shabbot (IRQ) | RSCH
Leopoldo Serantes (PHI) | 0
Oh Kwang-soo (KOR) | 5

Semifinals
Supap Boonrawd (THA) | 4
Mamoru Kuroiwa (JPN) | 1
Saad Shabbot (IRQ) | 0
Oh Kwang-soo (KOR) | 5

Final
Supap Boonrawd (THA)
Oh Kwang-soo (KOR) | RSCH
