= Boxing at the 1986 Asian Games – Men's 91 kg =

Boxing competitions

Men's 91 kg at the 1986 Asian Games
- Venue: Jamsil Students' Gymnasium
- Date: 29 September – 4 October 1986
- Competitors: 6 from 6 nations

Medalists
gold medal	Kim Yoo-hyun	South Korea
silver medal	Daljit Singh	India
bronze medal	Kausar Abbas	Pakistan
bronze medal	Montaser Shuaib	Kuwait

The men's heavyweight (91 kilograms) event at the 1986 Asian Games took place from 29 September to 4 October 1986 at Jamsil Students' Gymnasium, Seoul, South Korea.

A boxer may win by knockout or by points. Scoring is on the "10-point-must," with 5 judges scoring each round. The boxer with the higher score from a majority of the judges is the winner.

== Schedule ==
All times are Korea Standard Time (UTC+09:00)

Date	Time	Event
Monday, 29 September 1986	15:00	Quarterfinals
Thursday, 2 October 1986	15:00	Semifinals
Saturday, 4 October 1986	15:00	Final

== Results ==
Legend

- KO — Won by knockout
- RSC — Won by referee stop contest
- RSCH — Won by referee stop contest head blow

Quarterfinals
Montaser Shuaib (KUW)	RSCH
Anoop Kumar Thapa (NEP)
Kim Yoo-hyun (KOR)	4
Ismail Khalil (IRQ)	1

Semifinals
Daljit Singh (IND)	KO
Kausar Abbas (PAK)
Montaser Shuaib (KUW)
Kim Yoo-hyun (KOR)	KO

Final
Daljit Singh (IND)
Kim Yoo-hyun (KOR)	RSC
