= Boxing at the 1986 Asian Games – Men's 81 kg =

Boxing competitions

Men's 81 kg at the 1986 Asian Games
- Venue: Jamsil Students' Gymnasium
- Date: 28 September – 4 October 1986
- Competitors: 6 from 6 nations

Medalists
gold medal	Min Byung-yong	South Korea
silver medal	Hussain Shah	Pakistan
bronze medal	Dhan Bahadur Gurung	India
bronze medal	Mosharraf Hossain	Bangladesh

The men's light heavyweight (81 kilograms) event at the 1986 Asian Games took place from 28 September to 4 October 1986 at Jamsil Students' Gymnasium, Seoul, South Korea.

A boxer may win by knockout or by points. Scoring is on the "10-point-must," with 5 judges scoring each round. The boxer with the higher score from a majority of the judges is the winner.

== Schedule ==
All times are Korea Standard Time (UTC+09:00)

Date	Time	Event
Sunday, 28 September 1986	15:00	Quarterfinals
Wednesday, 1 October 1986	15:00	Semifinals
Saturday, 4 October 1986	15:00	Final

== Results ==
Legend

- RET — Won by retirement
- RSC — Won by referee stop contest
- RSCH — Won by referee stop contest head blow

Quarterfinals
Dhurba Lal Shrestha (NEP)
Mosharraf Hossain (BAN)	RET
Hussain Shah (PAK)	RSCH
Yousef Abu Rejab (KUW)

Semifinals
Dhan Bahadur Gurung (IND)
Min Byung-yong (KOR)	RET
Mosharraf Hossain (BAN)
Hussain Shah (PAK)	RSC

Final
Min Byung-yong (KOR)	RSCH
Hussain Shah (PAK)
