= Badminton at the 1986 Asian Games =

- Venue: Olympic Gymnastics Arena
- Dates: 27 September – 4 October
- Competitors: 98 from 11 nations

Badminton was contested at the 1986 Asian Games in Seoul, South Korea from 27 September to 4 October.

Singles, doubles, and team events were contested for both men and women. Mixed Doubles were also contested. All events were held at Olympic Gymnastics Arena.

== Medalists ==
Event	Gold	Silver	Bronze
Men's singles	Zhao Jianhua; China	Yang Yang; China	Sung Han-kook; South Korea
Men's singles	Zhao Jianhua; China	Yang Yang; China	Park Sung-bae; South Korea
Women's singles	Han Aiping; China	Li Lingwei; China	Hwang Hye-young; South Korea
Women's singles	Han Aiping; China	Li Lingwei; China	Kim Yun-ja; South Korea
Men's doubles	South Korea; Park Joo-bong; Kim Moon-soo	China; Tian Bingyi; Li Yongbo	China; Ding Qiqing; Chen Kang
Men's doubles	South Korea; Park Joo-bong; Kim Moon-soo	China; Tian Bingyi; Li Yongbo	Indonesia; Liem Swie King; Bobby Ertanto
Women's doubles	China; Lin Ying; Guan Weizhen	South Korea; Kim Yun-ja; Yoo Sang-hee	Indonesia; Rosiana Tendean; Imelda Wiguna
Women's doubles	China; Lin Ying; Guan Weizhen	South Korea; Kim Yun-ja; Yoo Sang-hee	Japan; Kimiko Jinnai; Sumiko Kitada
Mixed doubles	South Korea; Park Joo-bong; Chung Myung-hee	South Korea; Lee Deuk-choon; Chung So-young	China; Jiang Guoliang; Lin Ying
Mixed doubles	South Korea; Park Joo-bong; Chung Myung-hee	South Korea; Lee Deuk-choon; Chung So-young	China; Xiong Guobao; Qian Ping
Men's team	South Korea; Choi Byung-hak; Kim Chang-kook; Kim Joong-soo; Kim Moon-soo; Lee Deuk-choon; Park Joo-bong; Park Sung-bae; Sung Han-kook	China; Chen Kang; Ding Qiqing; Jiang Guoliang; Li Yongbo; Tian Bingyi; Xiong Guobao; Yang Yang; Zhao Jianhua	India; Leroy D'Sa; U. Vimal Kumar; Ravi Kunte; Sanat Misra; Syed Modi; Prakash Padukone; Uday Pawar
Men's team	South Korea; Choi Byung-hak; Kim Chang-kook; Kim Joong-soo; Kim Moon-soo; Lee Deuk-choon; Park Joo-bong; Park Sung-bae; Sung Han-kook	China; Chen Kang; Ding Qiqing; Jiang Guoliang; Li Yongbo; Tian Bingyi; Xiong Guobao; Yang Yang; Zhao Jianhua	Indonesia; Bobby Ertanto; Christian Hadinata; Eddy Hartono; Eddy Kurniawan; Liem Swie King; Lius Pongoh; Icuk Sugiarto; Hadibowo Susanto
Women's team	China; Gu Jiaming; Guan Weizhen; Han Aiping; Li Lingwei; Lin Ying; Qian Ping; Wu Jianqiu; Zheng Yuli	Japan; Kimiko Jinnai; Sumiko Kitada; Harumi Kohara; Hisako Takamine; Atsuko Tokuda; Yoshiko Yonekura	South Korea; Chung Myung-hee; Chung So-young; Hwang Hye-young; Kang Haeng-suk; Kim Ho-ja; Kim Yun-ja; Lee Myung-hee; Yoo Sang-hee
Women's team	China; Gu Jiaming; Guan Weizhen; Han Aiping; Li Lingwei; Lin Ying; Qian Ping; Wu Jianqiu; Zheng Yuli	Japan; Kimiko Jinnai; Sumiko Kitada; Harumi Kohara; Hisako Takamine; Atsuko Tokuda; Yoshiko Yonekura	Indonesia; Verawaty Fadjrin; Sarwendah Kusumawardhani; Elizabeth Latief; Ivana Lie; Rosiana Tendean; Imelda Wiguna

== Medal table ==
Rank	Nation	Gold	Silver	Bronze	Total
1	China (CHN)	4	4	3	11
2	South Korea (KOR)	3	2	5	10
3	Japan (JPN)	0	1	1	2
4	Indonesia (INA)	0	0	4	4
5	India (IND)	0	0	1	1
Totals (5 entries)		7	7	14	28

== Participating nations ==
A total of 98 athletes from 11 nations competed in badminton at the 1986 Asian Games:

- China (16)
- Hong Kong (6)
- India (12)
- Indonesia (14)
- Japan (11)
- Malaysia (7)
- Nepal (8)
- Pakistan (2)
- South Korea (16)
- Sri Lanka (1)
- Thailand (5)
