= Boxing at the 1986 Asian Games – Men's +91 kg =

Boxing competitions

Men's +91 kg at the 1986 Asian Games
- Venue: Jamsil Students' Gymnasium
- Date: 30 September – 4 October 1986
- Competitors: 6 from 6 nations

Medalists
| gold medal | Baik Hyun-man | South Korea |
| silver medal | Jaipal Singh | India |
| bronze medal | Tul Bahadur Thapa | Nepal |
| bronze medal | Muhammad Yousaf | Pakistan |

The men's super heavyweight (+91 kilograms) event at the 1986 Asian Games took place from 30 September to 4 October 1986 at Jamsil Students' Gymnasium, Seoul, South Korea.

A boxer may win by knockout or by points. Scoring is on the "10-point-must," with 5 judges scoring each round. The boxer with the higher score from a majority of the judges is the winner.

== Schedule ==
All times are Korea Standard Time (UTC+09:00)

| Date | Time | Event |
|---|---|---|
| Tuesday, 30 September 1986 | 15:00 | Quarterfinals |
| Thursday, 2 October 1986 | 15:00 | Semifinals |
| Saturday, 4 October 1986 | 15:00 | Final |

== Results ==
Legend

- RSC — Won by referee stop contest
- RSCH — Won by referee stop contest head blow
- WO — Won by walkover

Quarterfinals
Baik Hyun-man (KOR) | WO
Amer Jabbar (IRQ)
Muhammad Yousaf (PAK) | 4
Ali Al-Baluchi (KUW) | 1

Semifinals
Jaipal Singh (IND) | RSCH
Tul Bahadur Thapa (NEP)
Baik Hyun-man (KOR) | 5
Muhammad Yousaf (PAK) | 0

Final
Jaipal Singh (IND)
Baik Hyun-man (KOR) | RSC
