= Boxing at the 1986 Asian Games – Men's 75 kg =

Boxing competitions

Men's 75 kg at the 1986 Asian Games
- Venue: Jamsil Students' Gymnasium
- Date: 2–4 October 1986
- Competitors: 4 from 4 nations

Medalists
gold medal	Shin Joon-sup	South Korea
silver medal	Narong Inphrom	Thailand
bronze medal	Sushil Pokhrel	Nepal
bronze medal	Manjit Pal Singh	India

The men's middleweight (75 kilograms) event at the 1986 Asian Games took place from 2 to 4 October 1986 at Jamsil Students' Gymnasium, Seoul, South Korea.

A boxer may win by knockout or by points. Scoring is on the "10-point-must," with 5 judges scoring each round. Judges consider "number of blows landed on the target areas, domination of the bout, technique and tactical superiority and competitiveness." Each judge determines a winner for each round, who receives 10 points for the round, and assigns the round's loser a number of points between 7 and 9 based on performance. The judge's scores for each round are added to give a total score for that judge. The boxer with the higher score from a majority of the judges is the winner.

== Schedule ==
All times are Korea Standard Time (UTC+09:00)

Date	Time	Event
Thursday, 2 October 1986	15:00	Semifinals
Saturday, 4 October 1986	15:00	Final

== Results ==
Legend

- KO — Won by knockout

Semifinals		Final
Narong Inphrom (THA)	KO
Sushil Pokhrel (NEP)		Narong Inphrom (THA)	0
Shin Joon-sup (KOR)	5	Shin Joon-sup (KOR)	5
Manjit Pal Singh (IND)	0
