= Shooting at the 1986 Asian Games =

- Venue: Taenung International Shooting Range
- Dates: 21–28 September 1986

Shooting sports at the 1986 Asian Games were held in Seoul, South Korea on September 21–28, 1986.

== Medalists ==
=== Men ===
Event	Gold	Silver	Bronze
10 m air pistol	Xu Haifeng; China	Min Young-sam; South Korea	Mamoru Inagaki; Japan
10 m air pistol team	China; Wang Yifu; Xu Haifeng; Zuo Pei	South Korea; Lee Won-suk; Lim Tae-ho; Min Young-sam	Japan; Mamoru Inagaki; Fumihisa Semizuki; Shigetoshi Tashiro
25 m center fire pistol	Ikuo Fukuoka; Japan	Manop Panichpatikum; Thailand	Zhang Xiaodong; China
25 m center fire pistol team	Japan; Ikuo Fukuoka; Hideo Nonaka; Katsumasa Onishi	China; Leng Shubin; Li Zhongqi; Zhang Xiaodong	South Korea; Lim Tae-ho; Park Jong-kil; Yang Chung-yul
25 m rapid fire pistol	Li Zhongqi; China	Park Jong-kil; South Korea	Lim Jang-soo; South Korea
25 m rapid fire pistol team	South Korea; Lim Jang-soo; Park Jong-kil; Yang Chung-yul	China; Li Zhongqi; Peng Jianbin; Zhang Xiaodong	Japan; Junichi Haneda; Chiyokatsu Kimura; Hideo Nonaka
25 m standard pistol	Manop Panichpatikum; Thailand	Mamoru Inagaki; Japan	Leng Shubin; China
25 m standard pistol team	Thailand; Manop Panichpatikum; Peera Piromratna; Opas Ruengpanyawut	China; Leng Shubin; Li Zhongqi; Zhang Xiaodong	South Korea; Lim Tae-ho; Park Jong-kil; Yang Chung-yul
50 m pistol	Xu Haifeng; China	Wang Yifu; China	Gilbert U Hong Kong
50 m pistol team	China; Liu Jingsheng; Wang Yifu; Xu Haifeng	Japan; Chikafumi Hirai; Mamoru Inagaki; Shigetoshi Tashiro	South Korea; Lee Won-suk; Min Young-sam; Seo In-taek
10 m air rifle	Qiu Bo; China	Lee Eun-chul; South Korea	Xu Xiaoguang; China
10 m air rifle team	China; Qiu Bo; Xu Xiaoguang; Zhang Yingzhou	South Korea; Kim Jong-gil; Lee Eun-chul; Park Hee-dae	Japan; Ryohei Koba; Kaoru Matsuo; Hiroyuki Nakajo
50 m rifle prone	Cha Young-chul; South Korea	Xu Xiaoguang; China	Zhang Yingzhou; China
50 m rifle prone team	South Korea; Cha Young-chul; Kwak Jung-hoon; Yoon Deok-ha	China; Jiang Rong; Xu Xiaoguang; Zhang Yingzhou	Japan; Ryohei Koba; Yuji Ogawa; Kimihiko Oura
50 m rifle 3 positions	Ryohei Koba; Japan	Nam Hong-woo; South Korea	Zhang Yingzhou; China
50 m rifle 3 positions team	South Korea; Chang Jae-kwan; Lee Eun-chul; Nam Hong-woo	China; Jiang Rong; Xu Xiaoguang; Zhang Yingzhou	Japan; Norito Chosa; Ryohei Koba; Hiroyuki Nakajo
50 m standard rifle 3 positions	Qiu Bo; China	Kaoru Matsuo; Japan	Chinsen Thongkomol; Thailand
50 m standard rifle 3 positions team	China; Qiu Bo; Qiu Zeqing; Xu Xiaoguang	South Korea; Cha Young-chul; Chang Jae-kwan; Lee Eun-chul	India; Joydip Das; Bhagirath Samai; Ghisa Lal Yadav

=== Women ===
Event	Gold	Silver	Bronze
10 m air pistol	Tomoko Hasegawa; Japan	Rampai Yamfang; Thailand	Bang Hyun-joo; South Korea
10 m air pistol team	Japan; Tomoko Hasegawa; Hisayo Hayakawa; Etsuko Onobuchi	China; Cai Shan; Wen Zhifang; Zhu Yuqin	South Korea; Bang Hyun-joo; Kim Hye-yeong; Kim Yang-ja
25 m pistol	Wen Zhifang; China	Tomoko Hasegawa; Japan	Zhu Yuqin; China
25 m pistol team	China; Qi Chunxia; Wen Zhifang; Zhu Yuqin	Japan; Tomoko Hasegawa; Keiko Kato; Atsuko Sugimoto	Thailand; Promthida Chakshuraksha; Angsuman Jotikasthira; Rampai Yamfang
10 m air rifle	Park Jeong-ah; South Korea	Lee Hong-ki; South Korea	Soma Dutta; India
10 m air rifle team	South Korea; Kang Hye-ja; Lee Hong-ki; Park Jeong-ah	China; Guo Fengjuan; Li Dan; Zhang Qiuping	Japan; Reiko Kasai; Kyoko Kinoshita; Noriko Kosai
50 m rifle 3 positions	Zhou Danhong; China	Soma Dutta; India	Jin Dongxiang; China
50 m rifle 3 positions team	China; Jin Dongxiang; Zhang Qiuping; Zhou Danhong	Japan; Kyoko Kinoshita; Noriko Kosai; Noriko Ojima	South Korea; Gu Sun-bok; Kim Young-mi; Lee Hong-ki

=== Open ===
Event	Gold	Silver	Bronze
Trap	Byun Kyung-soo; South Korea	Peter Lim; Malaysia	Zhang Gang; China
Trap team	Japan; Yoshihiro Igarashi; Masao Obara; Toshiyuki Yamane	South Korea; Byun Kyung-soo; Eom Tae-jin; Park Chul-sung	China; Li Jinglong; Zhang Gang; Zhao Guisheng
Skeet	Zhang Weigang; China	Wang Zhonghua; China	Lim Dong-ki; South Korea
Skeet team	China; Wang Zhonghua; Yue Ming; Zhang Weigang	South Korea; Kim Young-jin; Lee Seung-kyun; Lim Dong-ki	Japan; Tadayoshi Ando; Isamu Aoki; Yasumasa Furo

== Medal table ==
Rank	Nation	Gold	Silver	Bronze	Total
1	China (CHN)	15	10	9	34
2	South Korea (KOR)	7	10	8	25
3	Japan (JPN)	6	6	8	20
4	Thailand (THA)	2	2	2	6
5	India (IND)	0	1	2	3
6	Malaysia (MAL)	0	1	0	1
7	Hong Kong (HKG)	0	0	1	1
Totals (7 entries)		30	30	30	90
