= Malaysia at the 1986 Asian Games =

- IOC code: MAS (MAL used at these Games)
- NOC: Olympic Council of Malaysia
- Website: www.olympic.org.my (in English)

in Seoul
- Competitors: 126 in 12 sports
- Medals Ranked 14th: Gold 0 Silver 5 Bronze 5 Total 10

Asian Games appearances (overview)
- 1954; 1958; 1962; 1966; 1970; 1974; 1978; 1982; 1986; 1990; 1994; 1998; 2002; 2006; 2010; 2014; 2018; 2022; 2026

Other related appearances
- North Borneo (1954, 1958, 1962); Sarawak (1962)

Malaysia competed in the 1986 Asian Games in Seoul, South Korea from 20 September to 5 October 1986. Malaysia ended the games at 10 overall medals. Abdul Hamid Omar was the head of the delegation.

== Medal summary ==
=== Medals by sport ===
Sport	Gold	Silver	Bronze	Total	Rank
Athletics	0	0	1	1	11
Bowling	0	1	2	3	6
Shooting	0	1	0	1	6
Swimming	0	2	2	4	4
Taekwondo	0	1	0	1	5
Total	0	5	5	10	14

=== Medallists ===
Medal	Name	Sport	Event
Silver	Ringo Wang	Bowling	Men's all-events
Silver	Peter Lim	Shooting	Mixed trap
Silver	Nurul Huda Abdullah	Swimming	Women's 400 metres freestyle
Silver	Nurul Huda Abdullah	Swimming	Women's 800 metres freestyle
Silver	Selvamuthu Ramasamy	Taekwondo	Men's 54 kg
Bronze	Josephine Mary Singarayar	Athletics	Women's 800 metres
Bronze	Ringo Wang	Bowling	Men's singles
Bronze	Allan Lee; Edward Lim; Stanley Tai	Bowling	Men's trios
Bronze	Nurul Huda Abdullah	Swimming	Women's 200 metres freestyle
Bronze	Nurul Huda Abdullah	Swimming	Women's 400 metres individual medley

== Athletics ==
Key

- Note–Ranks given for track events are within the athlete's heat only
- Q = Qualified for the next round
- q = Qualified for the next round as a fastest loser or, in field events, by position without achieving the qualifying target
- NR = National record
- N/A = Round not applicable for the event
- Bye = Athlete not required to compete in round

Women
Track event

Athlete	Event	Final	
Athlete	Event	Time	Rank
Josephine Mary Singarayar	800 m	2:07.44 NR	3rd place, bronze medalist(s)

== Badminton ==
Athlete	Event	Round of 32	Round of 16	Quarterfinal	Semifinal	Final	
Athlete	Event	Opposition Score	Opposition Score	Opposition Score	Opposition Score	Opposition Score	Rank
Misbun Sidek	Men's singles	Bye	Eddy Kurniawan (INA); L 15–9, 15–17, 13–15	Did not advance			
Foo Kok Keong	Men's singles	Bye	Pratap Adhikari (NEP); W 15–6, 15–6	Zhao Jianhua (CHN); L 7–15, 9–15	Did not advance		
Razif Sidek; Cheah Soon Kit	Men's doubles	Bye	Komchan Promsarin; Siripong Siripool (THA); L 5–15, 15–8, 9–15	Did not advance			
Rashid Sidek; Chong Weng Kai	Men's doubles	Bye	Tian Bingyi; Li Yongbo (CHN); L 6–15, 9–15	Did not advance			

Men's team
Quarterfinal

27 September	Malaysia	2–3	Indonesia

Misbun Sidek	1–2	Icuk Sugiarto	6–15, 15–11, 10–15
Foo Kok Keong	0–2	Eddy Kurniawan	10–15, 8–15
Chong Weng Kai / Misbun Sidek	0–2	Liem Swie King / Bobby Ertanto	2–15, 4–15
Razif Sidek / Cheah Soon Kit	2–1	Christian Hadinata / Hadibowo Susanto	15–7, 14–17, 15–2
Rashid Sidek	2–0	Lius Pongoh	Walkover

== Basketball ==
=== Men's tournament ===
Team	Pld	W	L
China	7	7	0
South Korea	7	6	1
Philippines	7	5	2
Jordan	7	3	4
Malaysia	7	3	4
Japan	7	2	5
Kuwait	7	2	5
Hong Kong	7	0	7

22 September

Hong Kong	62–94	Malaysia

Jamsil Gymnasium, Seoul

24 September

Jordan	81–79	Malaysia

Jamsil Gymnasium, Seoul

27 September

Japan	80–93	Malaysia

Jamsil Gymnasium, Seoul

28 September

Malaysia	60–108	China

Jamsil Gymnasium, Seoul

30 September

South Korea	110–78	Malaysia

Jamsil Gymnasium, Seoul

1 October

Malaysia	68–84	Philippines

Jamsil Gymnasium, Seoul

3 October

Malaysia	72–64	Kuwait

Jamsil Gymnasium, Seoul

Ranked 5th in final standings

=== Women's tournament ===
Team	Pld	W	L	PF	PA	PD	Pts
China	3	3	0	273	170	+103	6
South Korea	3	2	1	256	171	+85	5
Japan	3	1	2	223	207	+16	4
Malaysia	3	0	3	112	316	−204	3

23 September

China	107–38	Malaysia

Jamsil Gymnasium, Seoul

30 September

South Korea	116–31	Malaysia

Jamsil Gymnasium, Seoul

1 October

Japan	93–43	Malaysia

Jamsil Gymnasium, Seoul

Ranked 4th in final standings

== Bowling ==
Men

Athlete	Event	Final	
Athlete	Event	Result	Rank
Ringo Wang	Singles		3rd place, bronze medalist(s)
Allan Lee; Edward Lim; Stanley Tai	Trios		3rd place, bronze medalist(s)
Ringo Wang	All-events		2nd place, silver medalist(s)

== Field hockey ==
=== Men's tournament ===
Group B

Team	Pld	W	D	L	GF	GA	GD	Pts
Malaysia	3	3	0	0	15	5	+10	6
Pakistan	3	2	0	1	20	2	+18	4
Bangladesh	3	1	0	2	3	11	−8	2
Oman	3	0	0	3	4	24	−20	0

Qualified for the semifinals
Qualified for the 5th – 8th classification

22 September

Bangladesh	1–3	Malaysia

Seongnam Stadium, Seongnam

24 September

Oman	3–10	Malaysia

Seongnam Stadium, Seongnam

26 September

Malaysia	2–1	Pakistan

Seongnam Stadium, Seongnam

Semifinal

28 September

Malaysia	1–4	South Korea

Seongnam Stadium, Seongnam

Bronze medal match

29 September

India	4–1	Malaysia

Seongnam Stadium, Seongnam

Ranked 4th in final standings

=== Women's tournament ===
Team	Pld	W	D	L	GF	GA	GD	Pts
South Korea	5	5	0	0	45	2	+43	10
Japan	5	3	1	1	17	3	+14	7
India	5	3	1	1	17	5	+12	7
Malaysia	5	2	0	3	8	14	−6	4
Thailand	5	1	0	4	3	23	−20	2
Hong Kong	5	0	0	5	1	44	−43	0

23 September

India	2–1	Malaysia

Seongnam Stadium, Seongnam

25 September

South Korea	9–1	Malaysia

Seongnam Stadium, Seongnam

27 September

Malaysia	1–0	Thailand

Seongnam Stadium, Seongnam

28 September

Malaysia	5–0	Hong Kong

Seongnam Stadium, Seongnam

30 September

Japan	3–0	Malaysia

Seongnam Stadium, Seongnam

Ranked 4th in final standings

== Football ==
=== Men's tournament ===
Group C

Team	Pld	W	D	L	GF	GA	GD	Pts
Saudi Arabia	3	3	0	0	6	1	+5	6
Indonesia	3	1	1	1	2	3	−1	3
Qatar	3	0	2	1	2	3	−1	2
Malaysia	3	0	1	2	2	5	−3	1

Qualified for the semifinals

21 September

Malaysia	1–3	Saudi Arabia
Wong Hung Nung 12'		Al-Shehrani 28'; Abdullah 30', 53'

Gwangju Stadium, Gwangju

23 September

Qatar	1–1	Malaysia
Al-Sowaidi 90'		Yusof 33'

Gwangju Stadium, Gwangju

27 September

Indonesia	1–0	Malaysia
Sawor 35'

Gwangju Stadium, Gwangju

Ranked 15th in final standings

== Shooting ==
Mixed

Athlete	Event	Final	
Athlete	Event	Points	Rank
Peter Lim	Trap		2nd place, silver medalist(s)

== Swimming ==
Women

Athlete	Event	Final	
Athlete	Event	Time	Rank
Nurul Huda Abdullah	200 m freestyle	2:06.24	3rd place, bronze medalist(s)
Nurul Huda Abdullah	400 m freestyle	4:20.49	2nd place, silver medalist(s)
Nurul Huda Abdullah	800 m freestyle	8:50.44	2nd place, silver medalist(s)
Nurul Huda Abdullah	400 m individual medley	4:57.73	3rd place, bronze medalist(s)

== Taekwondo ==
Men

Athlete	Event	Final	
Athlete	Event	Opposition Score	Rank
Selvamuthu Ramasamy	54 kg	Kim Young-sik (KOR); L	2nd place, silver medalist(s)
