= Ogiwara =

Ogiwara (written: 荻原, lit. "miscanthus weed field") is a Japanese surname. Notable people with the surname include:

- Chiharu Ogiwara (荻原 千春; born 1957), Japanese boxer
- Kenji Ogiwara (荻原 健司; born 1969), Japanese Nordic combined skier and politician
- Noriko Ogiwara (荻原 規子; born 1959), Japanese writer
- Rokuzan Ogiwara (荻原 碌山; 1879–1910), Japanese sculptor
- Ogiwara Seisensui (荻原 井泉水; 1884–1976), pen-name of Ogiwara Tōkichi, Japanese poet
- Takuya Ogiwara (荻原 拓也; born 1999), Japanese footballer
- Tsugiharu Ogiwara (荻原 次晴; born 1969), Japanese Nordic combined skier
- Ryota Ogiwara (荻原 羚大; born 2008), Japanese motorcycle racer

== See also ==
- 7955 Ogiwara, a main-belt asteroid
