= Ding Qiqing =

Chinese badminton player (born 1962)

Ding Qiqing 丁其庆
Personal information
- Full name: Kei Nakashima 中島 慶
- Born: May 28, 1962 (age 64) Hangzhou, Zhejiang, China
- Years active: 1981-1987
- Height: 172 cm (5 ft 8 in)
- Weight: 65 kg (143 lb)

Sport
- Country: Japan (since 2001); China (until 2001)
- Sport: Badminton
- Handedness: Left
- Retired: 1987
- Event: Men's doubles
Medal record
Men's badminton
Representing China
Thomas Cup
Gold medal – first place	1986 Jakarta	Men's team
Asian Games
Bronze medal – third place	1986 Seoul	Men's doubles
Silver medal – second place	1986 Seoul	Men's team

Ding Qiqing (Chinese: 丁其庆; pinyin: Dīng Qíqìng; born May 28, 1962) whose Japanese name is Kei Nakashima (中島 慶, Nakashima Kei) is a Chinese former badminton player and one of the main coach of Japanese National Badminton Team.

== Career ==
Born in Zhejiang, Ding started playing badminton at the age of 9 and joined the Chinese national team in 1981. In 1985, Ding partnered with Li Yongbo to win the men's doubles titles at the German Open and the Swedish Open.

Ding was selected for the 1986 Thomas Cup squad. In the final against Indonesia, Ding lost the second men's singles match to Lius Pongoh. Despite this loss, the Chinese national team won the Thomas Cup 3–2. Ding also participated in the 1986 Asian Games, where he won bronze in the men's doubles event and silver in the men's team event.

In 1987, Ding retired prematurely due to a waist injury sustained during training.

== Post-Retirements and Coaching Careers ==
After his retirement, Ding pursued his studies at Ryukoku University in Japan from 1989 and graduated in 1992. In 2000, having adopted the Japanese name "Kei Nakashima", he changed his nationality and became a coach of the Japanese national team, following several years as a part-time coach for local Japanese badminton clubs.

Nakashima achieved his first major coaching success when the women's doubles pair he coached, Shizuka Yamamoto and Seiko Yamada, won a bronze medal at the 2003 IBF World Championships. A few years later, Nakashima coached the prominent Japanese women's doubles pair of Kumiko Ogura and Reiko Shiota, who won five All Japan Badminton Championships titles, the bronze medal at the 2006 Asian Games, and another bronze medal at the 2007 IBF World Championships.

Nakashima's coaching led to further success when Reika Kakiiwa and Mizuki Fujii won a silver medal at the 2012 Olympic Games in London. His coaching efforts culminated in Japan's first Olympic gold medal in badminton at the 2016 Olympic Games in Rio de Janeiro, when Misaki Matsutomo and Ayaka Takahashi secured the women's doubles title. After the match, Matsutomo thanked Nakashima, saying "If the Japanese badminton team did not have him, we would not be where we are today".

== Achievements ==
=== Asian Games ===
Men's doubles
Year	Venue	Partner	Opponent	Score	Result
1986	Olympic Gymnastics Arena; Seoul, South Korea	(China) Chen Kang	(South Korea) Kim Moon-soo (South Korea) Park Joo-bong	10–15, 3–15	Bronze

=== IBF Grand Prix ===
The World Badminton Grand Prix sanctioned by International Badminton Federation (IBF) since from 1983 to 2006.

Men's doubles
Year	Tournament	Partner	Opponent	Score	Result
1984	Dutch Masters	(China) Jiang Guoliang	(Indonesia) Christian Hadinata (Indonesia) Hadibowo Susanto	9–15, 10–15	(silver) Runner-up
1985	German Open	(China) Li Yongbo	(China) Zhang Xinguang (China) Tian Bingyi	15–5, 12–15, 15–7	(gold) Winner.
1985	Swedish Open	(China) Li Yongbo	(Sweden) Thomas Kihlström (Sweden) Stefan Karlsson	15–12, 14–18, 18–15	(gold) Winner
