= 1986 Asian Games medal table =

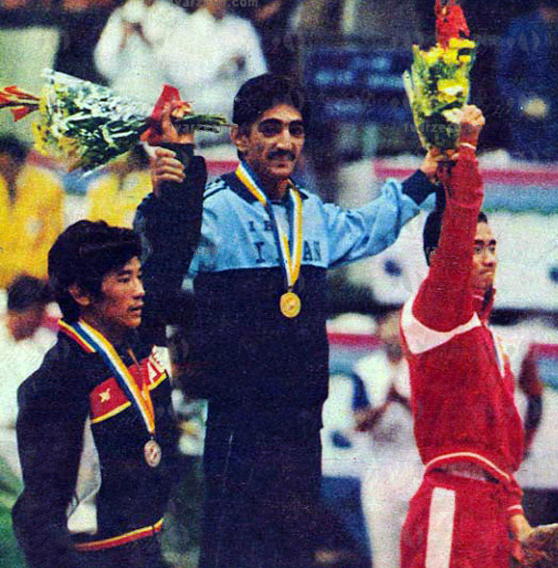
- A photo of 1986 Asian Games freestyle wrestling medalists Gao Wenhe, Majid Torkan, and Takashi Irie standing on the podium holding flower bouquets.
- Location: Seoul, South Korea

Highlights
- Most gold medals: China 94
- Most total medals: South Korea 224
- Medalling NOCs: 22

The 1986 Asian Games was a multi-sport event celebrated in Seoul, South Korea from September 20 to October 5, 1986. China, Japan and South Korea all became the first three countries in the history of Asian Games to cross the 200 medal-mark in one edition, having become the only three countries with three-digit medal tally as well in that year.

== Medal table ==
The ranking in this table is consistent with International Olympic Committee convention in its published medal tables. By default, the table is ordered by the number of gold medals the athletes from a nation have won (in this context, a "nation" is an entity represented by a National Olympic Committee). The number of silver medals is taken into consideration next and then the number of bronze medals. If nations are still tied, equal ranking is given; they are listed alphabetically by IOC country code.

* Host nation (South Korea)

Rank	Nation	Gold	Silver	Bronze	Total
1	China (CHN)	94	82	46	222
2	South Korea (KOR)*	93	55	76	224
3	Japan (JPN)	58	76	77	211
4	Iran (IRN)	6	6	10	22
5	India (IND)	5	9	23	37
6	Philippines (PHI)	4	5	9	18
7	Thailand (THA)	3	10	13	26
8	Pakistan (PAK)	2	3	4	9
9	Indonesia (INA)	1	5	14	20
10	Hong Kong (HKG)	1	1	3	5
11	Qatar (QAT)	1	0	3	4
12	Bahrain (BRN)	1	0	1	2
12	Lebanon (LIB)	1	0	1	2
14	Malaysia (MAL)	0	5	5	10
15	Iraq (IRQ)	0	5	2	7
16	Jordan (JOR)	0	3	1	4
17	Kuwait (KUW)	0	1	8	9
18	Singapore (SIN)	0	1	4	5
19	Saudi Arabia (SAU)	0	1	0	1
20	Nepal (NEP)	0	0	8	8
21	Bangladesh (BAN)	0	0	1	1
21	Oman (OMA)	0	0	1	1
Totals (22 entries)		270	268	310	848
