= Mosharraf Hossain (boxer) =

Bangladeshi boxer

Personal information
- Nationality: Bangladeshi
- Born: Rajshahi, East Pakistan

Sport
- Country: Bangladesh
- Sport: Boxing
- Event: Light heavyweight
- Retired: 1990
Medal record
Men's boxing
Representing Bangladesh
Asian Games
Bronze medal – third place	1986 Seoul	Light heavyweight (81 kg)
South Asian Games
Gold medal – first place	1985 Dhaka	Light heavyweight (81 kg)

Mosharraf Hossain is a former Bangladeshi boxer who won the first ever medal for Bangladesh in 1986 Asian Games. He won bronze medal in light heavyweight (81 kg) event. He also won a gold medal in the 1985 South Asian Games. Hossain was awarded the 1999 National Sports Awards.

== Early life ==
Hossain was born in Rajshahi district. He was an athlete in his childhood. He liked running, high jump, long jump,and shot put. He stood second in shot put in a Bangladesh inter-school competition in 1975.

== Career ==
After watching Ali and Foreman's boxing event The Rumble in the Jungle, Hossain was really inspired to be a boxer. He was able to meet his hero in 1989 South Asian Games, Muhammad Ali was present to inaugurate the event. Hossain joined Bangladesh Army Services Team in 1976 as warrant officer and retired from the team in 2005.

Mosharraf Hossain won a gold medal in 1985 South Asian Games and a bronze medal in 1986 Asian Games. He was National Light Heavyweight Champion for 10 consecutive years, from 1981 to 1990.

After retirement, he coaches in City Boxing Club in Rajshahi. Present Heavyweight Champion Jahangir Alam is his student.

== Personal life ==
Hossain has a son and two daughters.
