= Lee Hae-jung =

South Korean boxer

Medal record

Representing South Korea

Men's Boxing

Asian Games
| Gold medal – first place | New Delhi 1982 | Light Middleweight |
| Gold medal – first place | Seoul 1986 | Light Middleweight |

Asian Amateur Championships
| Gold medal – first place | Okinawa 1983 | Light Middleweight |

Lee Hae-Jung (Korean: 이해정; Hanja: 李海正) is a former South Korean amateur boxer. He is a two-time Asian Games gold medalist.
