= Ravi Kunte =

Indian badminton player

Sport
- Country: India
- Sport: Badminton
Medal record
Representing India
Men's badminton
Asian Games
Bronze medal – third place	1986 Seoul	Men's team

Ravi Kunte is an Indian former badminton player. He was the Indian national doubles champion. He was the bronze medalist in badminton at the 1986 Asian Games in the Men's team event.
