= Park Hyeong-ok =

Korean male boxer (born 1964)

Personal information
- Nationality: South Korean
- Born: 4 April 1964 (age 62)

Sport
- Sport: Boxing
Medal record
Men's boxing
Representing South Korea
Asian Games
Gold medal – first place	1986 Seoul	Featherweight

Park Hyeong-ok (born 4 April 1964) is a South Korean boxer. He competed in the men's featherweight event at the 1984 Summer Olympics.
