= Kim Yoo-hyun =

South Korean boxer

Medal record

Representing South Korea

Men's Boxing

Asian Games
| Gold medal – first place | Seoul 1986 | Heavyweight |

Kim Yoo-Hyun (Korean: 김유현; Hanja: 金裕賢) is a former South Korean amateur boxer.
