= Wanchai Pongsri =

Thai boxer

Personal information
- Nationality: Thai
- Born: 6 November 1963 (age 62)

Sport
- Sport: Boxing
Medal record
Representing Thailand
Men's boxing
Asian Games
Silver medal – second place	1982 Delhi	54 kg
Bronze medal – third place	1986 Seoul	60 kg
SEA Games
Gold medal – first place	1983 Singapore	Bantamweight

Wanchai Pongsri (Thai: วันชัย ผ่องศรี; born 6 November 1963) is a Thai boxer. He competed at the 1984 Summer Olympics and the 1988 Summer Olympics.
