= Adrianus Taroreh =

Indonesian boxer (1966–2013)

Personal information
- Nationality: Indonesian
- Born: 3 August 1966 Manado, Indonesia
- Died: 5 February 2013 (aged 46) Manado, Indonesia

Sport
- Sport: Boxing
Medal record
Men's boxing
Representing Indonesia
Asian Games
Silver medal – second place	1986 Seoul	Featherweight
SEA Games
Gold medal – first place	1985 Bangkok	Bantamweight
Gold medal – first place	1989 Kuala Lumpur	Lightweight

Adrianus Taroreh (3 August 1966 – 5 February 2013) was an Indonesian boxer. He competed in the men's lightweight event at the 1988 Summer Olympics.
