= Chiharu Ogiwara =

Japanese boxer (1957–2024)

Personal information
- Nationality: Japanese
- Born: 13 February 1957 Ibaraki Prefecture, Japan
- Died: 20 June 2024 (aged 67) Saitama Prefecture, Japan

Sport
- Sport: Boxing
Medal record
Men's boxing
Representing Japan
Asian Games
| Silver medal – second place | 1986 Seoul | 71 kg |

Chiharu Ogiwara (荻原 千春, Ogiwara Chiharu; 13 February 1957 – 20 June 2024) was a Japanese boxer. He competed in the men's light middleweight event at the 1984 Summer Olympics. Ogiwara died in Saitama Prefecture on 20 June 2024, at the age of 67.
