= Yoshiaki Takahashi =

Japanese boxer

Personal information
- Full name: 高橋 良秋 Takahashi Yoshiaki
- Nationality: Japanese
- Born: 28 September 1963 (age 61)

Sport
- Sport: Boxing

Yoshiaki Takahashi (高橋 良秋, Takahashi Yoshiaki; born 28 September 1963) is a Japanese boxer. He competed in the men's welterweight event at the 1988 Summer Olympics.
