= Kunihiro Miura =

Japanese boxer (born 1962)

Personal information
- Nationality: Japanese
- Born: 20 August 1962 (age 62); Iwaizumi, Iwate, Japan

Sport
- Sport: Boxing

Kunihiro Miura (三浦 国宏, Miura Kunihiro; born 20 August 1962) is a Japanese boxer. He competed at the 1984 Summer Olympics and the 1988 Summer Olympics.
