= Dal Bahadur Ranamagar =

Nepalese boxer

Personal information
- Nationality: Nepalese
- Born: July 1961
- Died: 18 May 1998 (aged 36)

Sport
- Sport: Boxing

Dal Bahadur Ranamagar (July 1961 – 18 May 1998) was a Nepalese boxer. He competed at the 1984 Summer Olympics and the 1988 Summer Olympics. At the 1988 Summer Olympics, he lost to Mohamed Hegazi of Egypt.
