= Shahuraj Birajdar =

Indian boxer (born 1963)

Personal information
- Nationality: Indian
- Born: 19 July 1963 (age 63)

Sport
- Sport: Boxing

Shahuraj Birajdar (born 19 July 1963) is a retired Indian boxer from Maharashtra. He competed in the men's bantamweight event at the 1988 Summer Olympics.
