= Muhammad Yousaf (boxer) =

Pakistani boxer (born 1960)

Personal information
- Nationality: Pakistani
- Born: 5 March 1960 (age 65)

Sport
- Sport: Boxing

Muhammad Yousaf (born 5 March 1960) is a Pakistani boxer. He competed in the men's super heavyweight event at the 1984 Summer Olympics where he was defeated by the future three-times world champion Lennox Lewis.
