= Indonesia at the 1986 Asian Games =

- IOC code: INA
- NOC: Indonesian Olympic Committee
- Website: www.nocindonesia.or.id (in English)

in Seoul
- Medals Ranked 9th: Gold 1 Silver 5 Bronze 14 Total 20

Asian Games appearances (overview)
- 1951; 1954; 1958; 1962; 1966; 1970; 1974; 1978; 1982; 1986; 1990; 1994; 1998; 2002; 2006; 2010; 2014; 2018; 2022; 2026

Indonesia participated in the 1986 Asian Games held in Seoul, South Korea from September 20, 1986 to October 5, 1986. This country was ranked ninth with 1 gold medal, 5 silver medals and 14 bronze medals with a total of 20 medals top.

== Medal summary ==
=== Medal table ===
Sport	Gold	Silver	Bronze	Total
Tennis	1	0	3	4
Taekwondo	0	3	1	4
Boxing	0	1	0	1
Cycling	0	1	0	1
Badminton	0	0	4	4
Bowling	0	0	2	2
Swimming	0	0	2	2
Sailing	0	0	1	1
Weightlifting	0	0	1	1
Total	1	5	14	20

=== Medalists ===
Medal	Name	Sport	Event
Gold	Suzanna Anggarkusuma; Yayuk Basuki	Tennis	Women's doubles
Silver	Adrianus Taroreh	Boxing	Men's −57 kg
Silver	Fanny Gunawan	Cycling	Men's road race
Silver	Yefi Triaji	Taekwondo	Men's −50 kg
Silver	Abdul Rozak	Taekwondo	Men's −58 kg
Silver	Lam Ting	Taekwondo	Men's −76 kg
Bronze	Liem Swie King; Bobby Ertanto	Badminton	Men's doubles
Bronze	Bobby Ertanto; Christian Hadinata; Eddy Hartono; Eddy Kurniawan; Liem Swie King; Lius Pongoh; Icuk Sugiarto; Hadibowo Susanto	Badminton	Men's team
Bronze	Rosiana Tendean; Imelda Wiguna	Badminton	Women's doubles
Bronze	Verawaty Fadjrin; Sarwendah Kusumawardhani; Elizabeth Latief; Ivana Lie; Rosiana Tendean; Imelda Wiguna	Badminton	Women's team
Bronze	Sri Mulyani Ruzgar; Fenny Tjahjo; Charlotte Sjamsuddin	Bowling	Women's Trios
Bronze	Poppy Marijke Tambis	Bowling	Women's All-events
Bronze	Abdul Malik Faisal	Sailing	Men's Division II
Bronze	Wirmandi Sugriat	Swimming	Men's 200 m breaststroke
Bronze	Lukman Niode; Wirmandi Sugriat; Sabeni Sudiono; Daniel Arief Budiman	Swimming	Men's 4×100 m medley relay
Bronze	Budi Setiawan	Taekwondo	Men's −54 kg
Bronze	Donald Wailan-Walalangi; Sulistyono	Tennis	Men's doubles
Bronze	Suzanna Anggarkusuma; Yayuk Basuki; Sri Utaminingsih	Tennis	Women's team
Bronze	Tintus Wibowo; Suzanna Anggarkusuma	Tennis	Mixed doubles
Bronze	Dirdja Wihardja	Weightlifting	Men's −56 kg
