= China at the 1986 Asian Games =

- IOC code: CHN
- NOC: Chinese Olympic Committee external link (in Chinese and English)

in Seoul
- Medals Ranked 1st: Gold 94 Silver 82 Bronze 46 Total 222

Asian Games appearances (overview)
- 1974; 1978; 1982; 1986; 1990; 1994; 1998; 2002; 2006; 2010; 2014; 2018; 2022; 2026

China competed in the 1986 Asian Games which were held in Seoul, South Korea from September 20, 1986 to October 5, 1986. China, together with Japan and South Korea, became the first three countries in the history of Asian Games to cross the 200 medal-mark in one edition.

== See also ==
- China at the Asian Games
- China at the Olympics
- Sport in China
