= Jamsil Students' Gymnasium =

Indoor arena in Seoul, South Korea

Coordinates: 37°30′44.01″N 127°4′31.45″E

Korean name
- Hangul: 잠실학생체육관
- Hanja: 蠶室學生體育館
- RR: Jamsil haksaeng cheyukgwan
- MR: Chamsil haksaeng ch'eyukkwan

Jamsil Students' Gymnasium (Korean: 잠실학생체육관) is an indoor sporting arena located in Seoul, South Korea. The capacity of the arena is 7,500 and was built from November 1972 to December 1976 to host Boxing events at the 1986 Asian Games and 2-years later the same sport on the 1988 Summer Olympics, and wheelchair basketball events at the 1988 Summer Paralympics.

The arena's name is derived from the fact that it is owned by the Korea University Sports Federation, and usually hosts university sports events, including the annual MBC Cup for college basketball teams and the annual KBL rookie draft.

== Events ==
Jamsil has held a number of Esports events, including the StarCraft competitions the 2015 10th SonicTV Starleague and 2012 Tving OSL.

PWF Korea Life Attack Pro wrestling event will be held on April 27, 2014 at this venue. A historical moment in Korean culture history as a lost sport has regained its popularity in this country. Aside from the Olympics, it also hosted boxing events at the 1986 Asian Games, and is the home stadium for the Seoul SK Knights of the Korean Basketball League.

On 15 March 2012, general cable broadcaster JTBC held a public shoot and press conference at the Gymnasium, to showcase their new programme Shinhwa Broadcast, hosted by six-member boyband Shinhwa.

== See also ==
- List of indoor arenas in South Korea
