= Pakistan at the 1986 Asian Games =

- IOC code: PAK
- NOC: Pakistan Olympic Association

in Seoul
- Medals Ranked 8th: Gold 2 Silver 3 Bronze 4 Total 9

Asian Games appearances (overview)
- 1954; 1958; 1962; 1966; 1970; 1974; 1978; 1982; 1986; 1990; 1994; 1998; 2002; 2006; 2010; 2014; 2018; 2022; 2026

Pakistan participated in the 10th Asian Games in Seoul, South Korea from September 20, to October 5, 1986. The national contingent won nine medals at this edition of the Games, including two gold medals.
