= Japan at the 1986 Asian Games =

- IOC code: JPN
- NOC: Japanese Olympic Committee

in Seoul
- Competitors: 439 in 25 sports
- Flag bearer: Ryoji Isaoka
- Medals Ranked 3rd: Gold 58 Silver 76 Bronze 77 Total 211

Asian Games appearances (overview)
- 1951; 1954; 1958; 1962; 1966; 1970; 1974; 1978; 1982; 1986; 1990; 1994; 1998; 2002; 2006; 2010; 2014; 2018; 2022; 2026

Japan participated in the 1986 Asian Games held in Seoul, South Korea from September 20 to October 5, 1986. This country was ranked 3rd with 58 gold medals, 76 silver medals and 77 bronze medals with a total of 211 medals to secure its third spot in the medal tally, and to become one of the first three countries to have more than 200 medals in an Asian Games event, alongside China and South Korea in the same year.
