= India at the 1986 Asian Games =

- IOC code: IND
- NOC: Indian Olympic Association

in Seoul
- Medals Ranked 5th: Gold 5 Silver 9 Bronze 23 Total 37

Asian Games appearances (overview)
- 1951; 1954; 1958; 1962; 1966; 1970; 1974; 1978; 1982; 1986; 1990; 1994; 1998; 2002; 2006; 2010; 2014; 2018; 2022; 2026

India participated in the 1986 Asian Games held in Seoul, South Korea from September 20 to October 5, 1985. Ranked 5th with 5 gold medals, 9 silver medals and 23 bronze medals with a total of 37 over-all medals. 4 of the 5 gold medals were won by P.T.Usha. Khajan Singh won a silver medal in men's 200m butterfly swimming, which was the only swimming medal for India at the Asian Games between 1951 and 2010.

== Medals by sport ==
| Sport | Gold | Silver | Bronze | Total |
|---|---|---|---|---|
| Athletics | 4 | 2 | 3 | 9 |
| Badminton | 0 | 0 | 1 | 1 |
| Boxing | 0 | 4 | 5 | 9 |
| Equestrian | 0 | 0 | 2 | 2 |
| Hockey | 0 | 0 | 2 | 2 |
| Judo | 0 | 0 | 4 | 4 |
| Sailing | 0 | 1 | 0 | 1 |
| Wrestling | 1 | 0 | 2 | 3 |
| Shooting | 0 | 1 | 2 | 3 |
| Swimming | 0 | 1 | 0 | 1 |
| Volleyball | 0 | 0 | 1 | 1 |
| Weightlifting | 0 | 0 | 1 | 1 |
| Total | 5 | 9 | 23 | 37 |

== Football ==
Coach: P. K. Banerjee

| No. | Pos. | Player | Date of birth (age) | Club |
|---|---|---|---|---|
| | GK | Atanu Bhattacharya | | (All India Football Federation) Bengal |
| | GK | Brahmanand Sankhwalkar | 6 March 1954 (aged 32) | (All India Football Federation) Salgaocar |
| | DF | Aloke Mukherjee | 1 May 1960 (aged 26) | (All India Football Federation) Bengal |
| | DF | Tarun Dey | | (All India Football Federation) Bengal |
| | DF | Sudip Chatterjee (c) | 5 February 1959 (aged 27) | (All India Football Federation) East Bengal |
| | DF | Krishnendu Roy | | (All India Football Federation) Bengal |
| | DF | V. P. Sathyan | 29 April 1965 (aged 21) | (All India Football Federation) Kerala Police |
| | DF | Derrick Pereira | 17 March 1962 (aged 24) | (All India Football Federation) Goa |
| | DF | Charanjit Singh | | (All India Football Federation) Punjab State Electricity Board |
| | MF | Bikash Panji | | (All India Football Federation) East Bengal |
| | MF | Mauricio Afonso | 16 November 1961 (aged 24) | (All India Football Federation) Dempo |
| | MF | Prasanta Banerjee | 12 February 1958 (aged 28) | (All India Football Federation) Bengal |
| | MF | Debashish Mishra | | (All India Football Federation) East Bengal |
| | FW | Krishanu Dey | 14 February 1962 (aged 24) | (All India Football Federation) East Bengal |
| | FW | Camilo Gonsalves | | (All India Football Federation) Goa |
| | FW | Babu Mani | | (All India Football Federation) Bengal |
| | FW | Biswajit Bhattacharya | | (All India Football Federation) East Bengal |
| | FW | Sisir Ghosh | | (All India Football Federation) Bengal |

=== Preliminary round ===
| Pos | Team | Pld | W | D | L | GF | GA | GD | Pts |
|---|---|---|---|---|---|---|---|---|---|
| 1 | South Korea | 3 | 2 | 1 | 0 | 7 | 2 | +5 | 5 |
| 2 | China | 3 | 2 | 0 | 1 | 9 | 6 | +3 | 4 |
| 3 | Bahrain | 3 | 1 | 1 | 1 | 4 | 5 | −1 | 3 |
| 4 | India | 3 | 0 | 0 | 3 | 1 | 8 | −7 | 0 |

Source: RSSSF
20 September

| South Korea | 3–0 | India |
|---|---|---|
| Noh Soo-jin 10'; Choi Soon-ho 36'; Park Chang-sun 84' (pen.) |

Gudeok Stadium, Busan

22 September

| China | 2–1 | India |
|---|---|---|
| Ma Lin 22', 25' | | Mishra 37' |

Gudeok Stadium, Busan

26 September

| Bahrain | 3–0 | India |
|---|---|---|
| Hisham 3', 45'; Hassan 23' |

Gudeok Stadium, Busan
