= Thailand at the 1986 Asian Games =

- IOC code: THA
- NOC: National Olympic Committee of Thailand
- Website: www.olympicthai.or.th/eng (in English and Thai)

in Seoul
- Medals Ranked 7th: Gold 3 Silver 10 Bronze 13 Total 26

Asian Games appearances (overview)
- 1951; 1954; 1958; 1962; 1966; 1970; 1974; 1978; 1982; 1986; 1990; 1994; 1998; 2002; 2006; 2010; 2014; 2018; 2022; 2026

Thailand participated in the 1986 Asian Games in Seoul on 20 September to 5 October 1990. Thailand ended the games with 26 overall medals including 3 gold medals. It won 3 gold, 10 silver and 13 bronze medals.
