= South Korea at the 1986 Asian Games =

- IOC code: KOR
- NOC: Korean Olympic Committee

in Seoul
- Competitors: 494 in 26 sports
- Officials: 144
- Medals Ranked 2nd: Gold 93 Silver 55 Bronze 76 Total 224

Asian Games appearances (overview)
- 1954; 1958; 1962; 1966; 1970; 1974; 1978; 1982; 1986; 1990; 1994; 1998; 2002; 2006; 2010; 2014; 2018; 2022; 2026

South Korea (IOC designation:Korea) participated in the 1986 Asian Games held in Seoul, South Korea from September 20, 1986 to October 5, 1986. It won 93 gold, 55 silver and 76 bronze medals, becoming one of the first countries to reach a 200-medal milestone, alongside China and Japan in the same year.

== Medal summary ==
=== Medal table ===
Sport	Gold	Silver	Bronze	Total
Boxing	12	0	0	12
Archery	9	9	7	25
Wrestling	9	2	5	16
Shooting	7	10	8	25
Athletics	7	5	13	25
Taekwondo	7	0	0	7
Judo	6	1	1	8
Tennis	4	4	2	10
Fencing	4	3	2	9
Gymnastics	3	4	6	13
Badminton	3	2	5	10
Table tennis	3	1	6	10
Equestrian	3	1	2	6
Weightlifting	3	1	2	6
Cycling	2	2	5	9
Sailing	2	1	0	3
Swimming	2	0	4	6
Bowling	2	0	2	4
Field hockey	2	0	0	2
Golf	1	1	0	2
Football	1	0	0	1
Handball	1	0	0	1
Rowing	0	4	4	8
Basketball	0	2	0	2
Volleyball	0	1	1	2
Water polo	0	1	0	1
Diving	0	0	1	1
Totals (27 entries)	93	55	76	224
