= 1986 Asian Games =

Multi-sport event in Seoul, South Korea

X Asian Games
- Host city: Seoul, South Korea
- Nations: 27
- Athletes: 4,839
- Events: 296 in 25 sports
- Opening: 20 September 1986
- Closing: 5 October 1986
- Opened by: Chun Doo-hwan; President of South Korea
- Closed by: Fahad Al-Ahmed Al-Jaber Al-Sabah; President of the Olympic Council of Asia
- Torch lighter: Jang Jae-keun and Park Mi-sun
- Main venue: Olympic Stadium
- Website: ocasia.org (archived)

Summer

Winter

The 1986 Asian Games (1986년 아시아 경기대회/1986년 아시안 게임), officially known as the 10th Asian Games and the X Asiad (제10회 아시아 경기대회/제10회 아시안 게임) and commonly known as Seoul 1986 (서울 1986), were held from 20 September to 5 October 1986, in Seoul, South Korea. The venues and facilities of the 10th Asiad were the same venues and facilities that would be used in the 1988 Summer Olympics, as it was considered a test event.

Seoul had previously been scheduled to host the 1970 games, but it received security threats from neighbouring North Korea, forcing it to give up hosting the games to previous 1966 host Bangkok, Thailand.

== Bidding process ==
Baghdad, Iraq; Pyongyang, North Korea; and Seoul, South Korea were the bidding cities for the Games, but during the process Baghdad and Pyongyang withdrew, leaving Seoul as only bidding city.

== Development and preparations ==
=== Marketing ===
==== Mascots ====
The official mascots for the 1986 Asian Games were Hodori the tiger and Gomdoori the black bear, which were also the mascots of the 1988 Summer Olympics and 1988 Summer Paralympics. They are a stylized tiger and bear designed by Kim Hyun and Lee Yun Soo respectively as an amicable Amur tiger and Asian black bear respectively, portraying the friendly and hospitable traditions of the Korean people.

=== Venues ===
The following venues were used during the Games.

Venue	Sports		
Venue	Sports	Jamsil Olympic Stadium	Ceremonies, Athletics, Football (Finals)
Busan Gudeok Stadium	Football		
Busan Yachting Center	Sailing		
Daegu Civic Stadium	Football		
Daejeon Stadium	Football		
Dongdaemun Stadium	Football		
East Seoul Bowling Center	Bowling		
Gwacheon Equestrian Park	Equestrian		
Gwangju Mudeung Stadium	Football		
Hanyang Country Club	Golf		
Hanyang University Gymnasium	Volleyball		
Hwarang Archery Field	Archery		
Jamsil Arena	Basketball		
Jamsil Indoor Swimming Pool	Diving, Swimming, Water polo		
Jamsil Students' Gymnasium	Boxing		
Misari Regatta	Rowing		
Seoul Olympic Gymnastics Arena	Badminton, Gymnastics		
Olympic Fencing Gymnasium	Fencing		
Sangmu Gymnasium	Wrestling		
Olympic Tennis Center	Tennis		
Olympic Weightlifting Gymnasium	Weightlifting		
Saemaul Sports Hall	Judo		
Seongnam Hockey Stadium	Field hockey		
Seoul Olympic Velodrome	Cycling (track)		
Seoul National University Gymnasium	Table tennis		
Suwon Gymnasium	Handball		
Sungkyunkwan University Suwon Campus Gymnasium	Taekwondo		
Taenung International Shooting Range	Shooting		
Tongillo Road Course	Cycling (road)		

== The Games ==
=== Boycotting countries ===
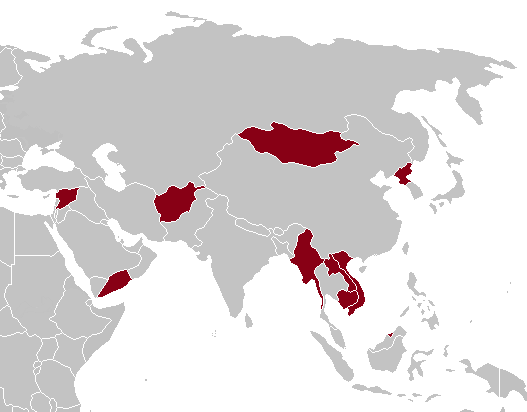
Boycotting countries are in dark red

North Korea boycotted the Asian Games along with its allies Mongolia, Vietnam, Laos, Afghanistan and South Yemen. Burma and Syria did not participate for financial reasons, while Brunei Darussalam did not participate owing to the country being amidst a 40‑day period of national mourning after the death of the Sultan's father on September 7th. The only participating country from the Eastern Bloc, the People's Republic of China, which was set to host the next games in Beijing, did participate and sent a high profile delegation, and ultimately finished at the top of the medal table. Two years later, all except North Korea participated at the 1988 Summer Olympics, although Brunei sent only one official and no athletes.

=== Participating National Olympic Committees ===
The following 27 NOCs participated.

- Bahrain (63)
- Bangladesh (51)
- Bhutan (8)
- China (388)
- Hong Kong (184)
- India (300)
- Indonesia (205)
- Iran (94)
- Iraq (52)
- Japan (440)
- Jordan (30)
- Kuwait (191)
- Lebanon (10)
- Malaysia (125)
- Maldives (5)
- Nepal (105)
- North Yemen (10)
- Oman (54)
- Pakistan (98)
- Philippines (93)
- Qatar (62)
- Saudi Arabia (73)
- Singapore (33)
- South Korea (494)
- Sri Lanka (20)
- Thailand (204)
- United Arab Emirates (30)

Number of athletes by National Olympic Committees (by highest to lowest)

IOC Letter Code	Country	Athletes
KOR	South Korea	494
JPN	Japan	440
CHN	China	388
IND	India	300
INA	Indonesia	205
THA	Thailand	204
KUW	Kuwait	191
HKG	Hong Kong	184
MAL	Malaysia	125
NEP	Nepal	105
PAK	Pakistan	98
IRN	Iran	94
PHI	Philippines	93
KSA	Saudi Arabia	73
BRN	Bahrain	63
QAT	Qatar	62
OMA	Oman	54
IRQ	Iraq	52
BAN	Bangladesh	51
SIN	Singapore	33
JOR	Jordan	30
UAE	United Arab Emirates	30
SRI	Sri Lanka	20
LIB	Lebanon	10
YAR	North Yemen	10
BHU	Bhutan	8
MDV	Maldives	5

=== Sports ===
- Archery (12)
- Athletics (42)
- Badminton (7)
- Basketball (2)
- Bowling (12)
- Boxing (12)
- Cycling (9)
- Diving (4)
- Equestrian (6)
- Fencing (8)
- Field hockey (2)
- Football (1)
- Golf (2)
- Gymnastics (14)
- Handball (1)
- Judo (8)
- Rowing (8)
- Sailing (5)
- Shooting (30)
- Swimming (29)
- Table tennis (7)
- Taekwondo (8)
- Tennis (7)
- Volleyball (2)
- Water polo (1)
- Weightlifting (10)
- Wrestling (20)

=== Calendar ===
●	Opening ceremony	Event competitions	●	Event finals	●	Closing ceremony

September / October 1986	20th Sat	21st Sun	22nd Mon	23rd Tue	24th Wed	25th Thu	26th Fri	27th Sat	28th Sun	29th Mon	30th Tue	1st Wed	2nd Thu	3rd Fri	4th Sat	5th Sun	Gold medals
Archery										4	8						12
Athletics										4	9	10		6	8	5	42
Badminton										2					5		7
Basketball													1	1			2
Bowling							2	2		6		2					12
Boxing															12		12
Cycling – Road		1							2								3
Cycling – Track				1	1	1		3									6
Diving			1	1		1	1										4
Equestrian							2		1			1	1		1		6
Fencing						1	2	1		2		2					8
Field hockey										1	1						2
Football																1	1
Golf					2												2
Gymnastics		1	1	2	10												14
Handball									1								1
Judo												2	2	2	2		8
Rowing						8											8
Sailing										5							5
Shooting		4	5	7		2	4	5	3								30
Swimming		4	5	5	5	5	5										29
Table tennis						2					5						7
Taekwondo											2	2	2	2			8
Tennis						2						2	2	1			7
Volleyball														1	1		2
Water polo													1				1
Weightlifting		1	1	1	1	1		1	1	1	1	1					10
Wrestling								5	5					5	5		20
Total gold medals		11	13	17	19	23	16	17	13	25	26	22	9	18	34	6	269
Ceremonies	●															●	
September / October 1986	20th Sat	21st Sun	22nd Mon	23rd Tue	24th Wed	25th Thu	26th Fri	27th Sat	28th Sun	29th Mon	30th Tue	1st Wed	2nd Thu	3rd Fri	4th Sat	5th Sun	Gold medals

== Medal table ==
The top ten ranked NOCs at these Games are listed below. The host nation, South Korea, is highlighted.

* Host nation (South Korea)

Rank	Nation	Gold	Silver	Bronze	Total
1	China (CHN)	94	82	46	222
2	South Korea (KOR)*	93	55	76	224
3	Japan (JPN)	58	76	77	211
4	Iran (IRN)	6	6	10	22
5	India (IND)	5	9	23	37
6	Philippines (PHI)	4	5	9	18
7	Thailand (THA)	3	10	13	26
8	Pakistan (PAK)	2	3	4	9
9	Indonesia (INA)	1	5	14	20
10	Hong Kong (HKG)	1	1	3	5
11–22	Remaining	3	16	35	54
Totals (22 entries)		270	268	310	848

== Controversies ==
=== Gimpo International Airport bombing ===
A North Korean spy detonated a bomb behind a vending machine in Gimpo International Airport and killed five people, including a South Korean delegate, just a few days before the Games started.

== See also ==
- 1986 Asian Winter Games
- 1988 Summer Olympics
- 2002 Asian Games
- 2014 Asian Games

Preceded by New Delhi	Asian Games; Seoul; X Asiad (1986)	Succeeded by Beijing
