= Taekwondo at the 1986 Asian Games =

Asian Games Taekwondo competition

- Venue: Sungkyunkwan University
- Dates: 30 September – 3 October 1986
- Competitors: 84 from 17 nations

Taekwondo took place from September 30 to October 3 at the 1986 Asian Games in Sungkyunkwan University, Seoul, South Korea. Men's competitions were held in eight weight categories. The host nation, South Korea, dominated the competition, winning seven out of eight possible gold medals.

== Schedule ==
| P | Preliminary rounds | F | Final |

| Event↓/Date → | 30th Tue | | 1st Wed | | 2nd Thu | | 3rd Fri | |
|---|---|---|---|---|---|---|---|---|
| Men's 50 kg | P | F | | | | | | |
| Men's 54 kg | P | F | | | | | | |
| Men's 58 kg | | | P | F | | | | |
| Men's 64 kg | | | P | F | | | | |
| Men's 70 kg | | | | | P | F | | |
| Men's 76 kg | | | | | P | F | | |
| Men's 83 kg | | | | | | | P | F |
| Men's +83 kg | | | | | | | P | F |

== Medalists ==
| Event | Gold | Silver | Bronze |
|---|---|---|---|
| Finweight (−50 kg) | Lee Jong-sun; South Korea | Yefi Triaji; Indonesia | Bidhan Lama; Nepal |
| Finweight (−50 kg) | Lee Jong-sun; South Korea | Yefi Triaji; Indonesia | Abdullah Al-Ajmi; Kuwait |
| Flyweight (−54 kg) | Kim Young-sik; South Korea | Selvamuthu Ramasamy; Malaysia | Anan Meksawan; Thailand |
| Flyweight (−54 kg) | Kim Young-sik; South Korea | Selvamuthu Ramasamy; Malaysia | Budi Setiawan; Indonesia |
| Bantamweight (−58 kg) | Ebrahim Ghaderi; Iran | Abdul Rozak; Indonesia | Tareq Lababidi; Jordan |
| Bantamweight (−58 kg) | Ebrahim Ghaderi; Iran | Abdul Rozak; Indonesia | Ram Bahadur Ghachhe; Nepal |
| Featherweight (−64 kg) | Han Jae-koo; South Korea | Samer Kamal; Jordan | Tana Sinprasat; Thailand |
| Featherweight (−64 kg) | Han Jae-koo; South Korea | Samer Kamal; Jordan | Rashid Al-Owjan; Qatar |
| Lightweight (−70 kg) | Park Bong-kwon; South Korea | Ali Hajipour; Iran | Monsour del Rosario; Philippines |
| Lightweight (−70 kg) | Park Bong-kwon; South Korea | Ali Hajipour; Iran | Faraj Al-Fadhel; Kuwait |
| Welterweight (−76 kg) | Moon Jong-kook; South Korea | Lam Ting; Indonesia | Katsuhiro Oki; Japan |
| Welterweight (−76 kg) | Moon Jong-kook; South Korea | Lam Ting; Indonesia | Raj Kumar Rai; Nepal |
| Middleweight (−83 kg) | Lee Kye-haeng; South Korea | Ahmad Ali; Jordan | Hirokazu Shiokawa; Japan |
| Middleweight (−83 kg) | Lee Kye-haeng; South Korea | Ahmad Ali; Jordan | Raj Kumar Buchhe; Nepal |
| Heavyweight (+83 kg) | Kang Seung-woo; South Korea | Tawfiq Nwaiser; Jordan | Ali Mohamed Salah; Qatar |
| Heavyweight (+83 kg) | Kang Seung-woo; South Korea | Tawfiq Nwaiser; Jordan | Rashid Hassan Bado; Bahrain |

== Medal table ==
| Rank | Nation | Gold | Silver | Bronze | Total |
|---|---|---|---|---|---|
| 1 | South Korea (KOR) | 7 | 0 | 0 | 7 |
| 2 | Iran (IRN) | 1 | 1 | 0 | 2 |
| 3 | Indonesia (INA) | 0 | 3 | 1 | 4 |
| 3 | Jordan (JOR) | 0 | 3 | 1 | 4 |
| 5 | Malaysia (MAL) | 0 | 1 | 0 | 1 |
| 6 | Nepal (NEP) | 0 | 0 | 4 | 4 |
| 7 | Japan (JPN) | 0 | 0 | 2 | 2 |
| 7 | Kuwait (KUW) | 0 | 0 | 2 | 2 |
| 7 | Qatar (QAT) | 0 | 0 | 2 | 2 |
| 7 | Thailand (THA) | 0 | 0 | 2 | 2 |
| 11 | Bahrain (BRN) | 0 | 0 | 1 | 1 |
| 11 | Philippines (PHI) | 0 | 0 | 1 | 1 |
| Totals (12 entries) | | 8 | 8 | 16 | 32 |

== Participating nations ==
A total of 84 athletes from 17 nations competed in taekwondo at the 1986 Asian Games:

- Bahrain (6)
- Bhutan (1)
- Hong Kong (2)
- India (2)
- Indonesia (7)
- Iran (5)
- Japan (6)
- Jordan (7)
- Kuwait (5)
- Malaysia (2)
- Nepal (8)
- Philippines (8)
- Qatar (8)
- Saudi Arabia (2)
- Singapore (1)
- South Korea (8)
- Thailand (6)
