= Shervin Hajipour discography =

Discography of Iranian singer-songwriter

- Music videos: 6
- Released songs: 37
- As featured artist: 3
- Soundtrack songs: 5
- Unreleased songs: 48

Iranian singer-songwriter and producer Shervin Hajipour has released thirty-seven songs, three soundtrack songs, six music videos, forty-eight unreleased songs, and five songs as featured artist. After auditioning in New Era on March 22, 2019 with "Maybe Paradise" which he himself wrote and performed, he released the song as his debut single on all platforms and gained recognition among Iranian young generation. After releasing many songs, he released his worldwide hit "For" on September 28, 2022. The song was inspired by the Death of Mahsa Amini. It was first released on Hajipour's Instagram account and it was taken down from the platform in less than 48 hours following Hajipour's arrest by the authorities on September 29. In less than 48 hours the song received about 40 million views. It was later described as "the anthem" of the Mahsa Amini protests. Due to Hajipour's rising popularity, his other songs including "After Us", "Spring Has Come" and "Close Your Eyes" went viral and became popular among fans.

== Released songs ==
Title	Year	Original title	Album	Notes	Ref(s)
"Maybe Paradise"	2019	Shayad Behesht	Non-album singles		
"Suitcase"	2020	Chamedoon	Non-album singles		
"Jealous"	2020	Hasood	Non-album singles		
"to See a Tulip"	2020	Laleh Ra Didan	Non-album singles		
"Friend"	2020	Refigh	Non-album singles		
"Like You"	2020	Mesle To	Non-album singles		
"Spring Has Come"	2020	Bahar Oomad	Non-album singles		
"Karma"	2020	Karma	Non-album singles		
"Wolf"	2020	Gorg	Non-album singles		
"Mom Style"	2020	Mom Style	Non-album singles		
"Extinct Crane"	2021	Dornaye Mongharez	Non-album singles		
"Apply"	2021	Apply	Non-album singles		
"Shadow"	2021	Saye	Non-album singles		
"Tomorrow When You Wake Up"	2021	Farda Ke Bidar Shi Az Khab	Non-album singles		
"Piano"	2021	Piano	Non-album singles		
"Next to the Fishes"	2021	Kenare Mahiha	Non-album singles		
"Expiration"	2021	Engheza	Non-album singles		
"Scar"	2021	Zakhm	Non-album singles		
"Maybe Paradise (Acoustic Version)"	2021	Shayad Behesht (Acoustic)	Non-album singles		
"After Us"	2021	Ba’de Ma	Non-album singles		
"Crow"	2022	Kalagh	Non-album singles	With Ashkan Kagan	
"Good Days"	2022	Roozaye Khoob	Non-album singles		
"Life Insurance"	2022	Bimeye Omr	Non-album singles		
"The Eighth Sin"	2022	Sin e Hashtom	Non-album singles		
"You Were for Me"	2022	Boodi Bara Man	Non-album singles		
"You're Not Around"	2022	Peydat Nist	Non-album singles		
"I Kiss You"	2022	Miboosamet	Non-album singles		
"Permanent"	2022	Daemi	Non-album singles		
"I Won't Give Her to the World"	2022	Be Donya Nemidamesh	Non-album singles		
"Telephone"	2022	Telephone	Non-album singles		
"Degradation"	2022	Kasre Sha'n	Non-album singles		
"Close Your Eyes"	2022	Cheshmato Beband	Non-album singles		
"For"	2022	Baraye	Non-album singles	Inspired by the Mahsa Amini protests	
"Garbage"	2024	Ashghal	Non-album singles		
"At Night"	2024	Shabooneh	Non-album singles		
"Shooting Stars"	2024	Shooting Stars	Non-album singles		
"Til When"	2025	Ta Key	Non-album singles		

== As featured artist ==
Title	Year	Original title	Artist	Notes	Ref(s)
"Ruins"	2018	Kharab	Sajadii		
"Home"	2019	Khoone	Sajadii		
"If I Come Back"	2019	Age Bargardam	Sajadii		

== Soundtrack songs ==
Title	Year	Original title	Album	Notes	Ref(s)
"Because You're Still Alive"	2019	Chon Hanooz Zendei	Sport Show	From the Television Program "Sport Show"	
"My Beloved"	2020	Khoobe Man	Tsunami	From the Motion Picture "Tsunami"	
"Baazimoon"	2020	Baazimoon	Baazimoon	With Hamidreza Tarkashvand – From the Television Program "Baazimoon"	
"Come With Me"	2025	Ba Man Bia	Dolphin Boy	From the Animated Motion Picture "Dolphin Boy"	
"Savage"	2025	Vahshi	The Savage	From the Television Series "The Savage"	

== Unreleased songs ==
Title	Year	Original title	Notes	Ref(s)
"Because It's Autumn"	2018	Akhe Paeezeh		
"Just As Soon"	2018	Be Hamin Zoodi		
"Like The Day That"	2019	Mesle Oun Roozi Ke		
"Til Love"	2019	Ta Eshgh		
"A Piece of Cloud"	2019	Ye Tike Abr		
"Another Planet"	2019	Ye Sayareye Dige		
"The Most Beautiful Incident"	2019	Zibatarin Etefagh		
"Superficial"	2019	Sathi		
"Souvenir"	2019	Yadegar		
"Damp Soil"	2019	Khake Nam Khorde		
"A Song to Kill You"	2019	Naghmei Baraye Koshtanat		
"My Everything"	2019	Tamameh Man		
"But I'm Still Here"	2019	Vali Baz Hastam		
"No One Will Take Your Place"	2019	Hichki Nemiad Jat		
"Forest Moon"	2019	Mah Jangal		
"With All My Life"	2019	Ba Tamameh Joonam		
"With Her Pains"	2019	Ba Dardash		
"Astray"	2019	Birahe	Released along with a promotional video	
"Another Person"	2019	Ye Adame Dige		
"Til When"	2019	Ta Key		
"I'm With You"	2019	Man Pishetam		
"Saturdays at 6 PM"	2019	Shanbeha Saat Shish		
"Yalda"	2019	Yalda		
"It Means Hope"	2020	Yani Omid		
"But Not That Much"	2020	Vali Na Ounghadr		
"Under the Old Cedar"	2020	Zire Sarve Pir		
"I Kill for You"	2020	Mikosham Barat		
"Lazy Day"	2020	Tanbal's Day		
"Cinematic"	2020	Cinemaei	Released along with a promotional video	
"Hope Kills"	2020	Omid Mikoshe	Released along with a promotional video	
"Moody"	2020	Moody		
"Awkward"	2020	Nahanjar		
"The Letter That You Never Read"	2020	Namei Ke Hichvaght Nakhoundi		
"When the Sun Sets"	2020	Vaghti Ke Shod Ghoroub		
"God Be with You"	2021	Khoda Be Hamrahet		
"Black Spots"	2021	Lakehaye Meshki	Released along with a promotional video	
"Colored Garbage"	2021	Ashghalaye Rangi		
"Alvaat"	2021	Alvaat		
"Clown"	2021	Dalghak		
"Shy"	2021	Khejalati		
"My Birthday"	2021	Tavalodam		
"Happy Ending"	2021	Payane Khoob		
"I Wasn't Insane"	2021	Majnun Naboudam		
"Don't be Afraid"	2021	Natars		
"Extra"	2021	Ezafi	Released along with a promotional video	
"Port's Rain"	2021	Baroune Bandar		
"Blue Wrestling Singlet"	2021	Do Bandeh Abi		
"I Got You"	2021	Daramet		

== Music videos ==
Title	Year	Original title	Artist(s)	Director(s)	Note(s)	Ref.
"Because You're Still Alive"	2019	Chon Hanooz Zendei	Himself	Mohsen Ahanj	Television Program "Sport Show" soundtrack	
"My Beloved"	2020	Khoobe Man	Himself	Eugène Haghighi, Mohammad Reza Sadrameli	Co-starred alongside Fereshteh Hosseini	
"Maybe Paradise (Acoustic Version)"	2021	Shayad Behesht (Acoustic Version)	Himself	Ali Pazani, Mahyar Keshavarz		
"You Were for Me"	2022	Boodi Bara Man	Himself	Ali Pazani		
"Telephone"	2022	Telephone	Himself	Ali Pazani		
"At Night"	2024	Shabooneh	Himself	Mahyar Keshavarz		
