= The Voice of Germany season 12 =

Season of television series

The Voice of Germany
- Season 12
- Promotional poster featuring coaches Forster, Kloß, Garvey, and Maffay
- Hosted by: Thore Schölermann; Melissa Khalaj
- Coaches: Rea Garvey; Stefanie Kloß; Peter Maffay; Mark Forster
- Winner: Anny Ogrezeanu
- Winning coach: Mark Forster
- Runner-up: Julian Pförtner

Release
- Original network: ProSieben; Sat.1
- Original release: August 18 – November 4, 2022

Season chronology
- ← Previous; Season 11 Next → Season 13

The twelfth season of the talent show The Voice of Germany premiered on 18 August 2022. The show was broadcast by two local TV stations, ProSieben and Sat.1, during the Blind Auditions and the Battles. The rest episodes of the season were broadcast by Sat.1 only.

Mark Forster returned for his sixth season. Rea Garvey and Stefanie Kloß, who last appeared on season 10, returned as coaches for their seventh and fourth seasons respectively, replacing Johannes Oerding and Sarah Connor. Peter Maffay joined the show as a new coach this season, replacing Nico Santos. Meanwhile, Thore Schölermann returned for his eleventh season as host, with Melissa Khalaj replacing Lena Gercke as the new host.

Anny Ogrezeanu was named The Voice of Germany on November 4, 2022. This marked Mark Forster's first win on the main show after being a coach for six seasons, and his third in the entire series (twice on the Kids' version).

== Panelists ==
=== Coaches ===
The Voice of Germany season 12 main coaches

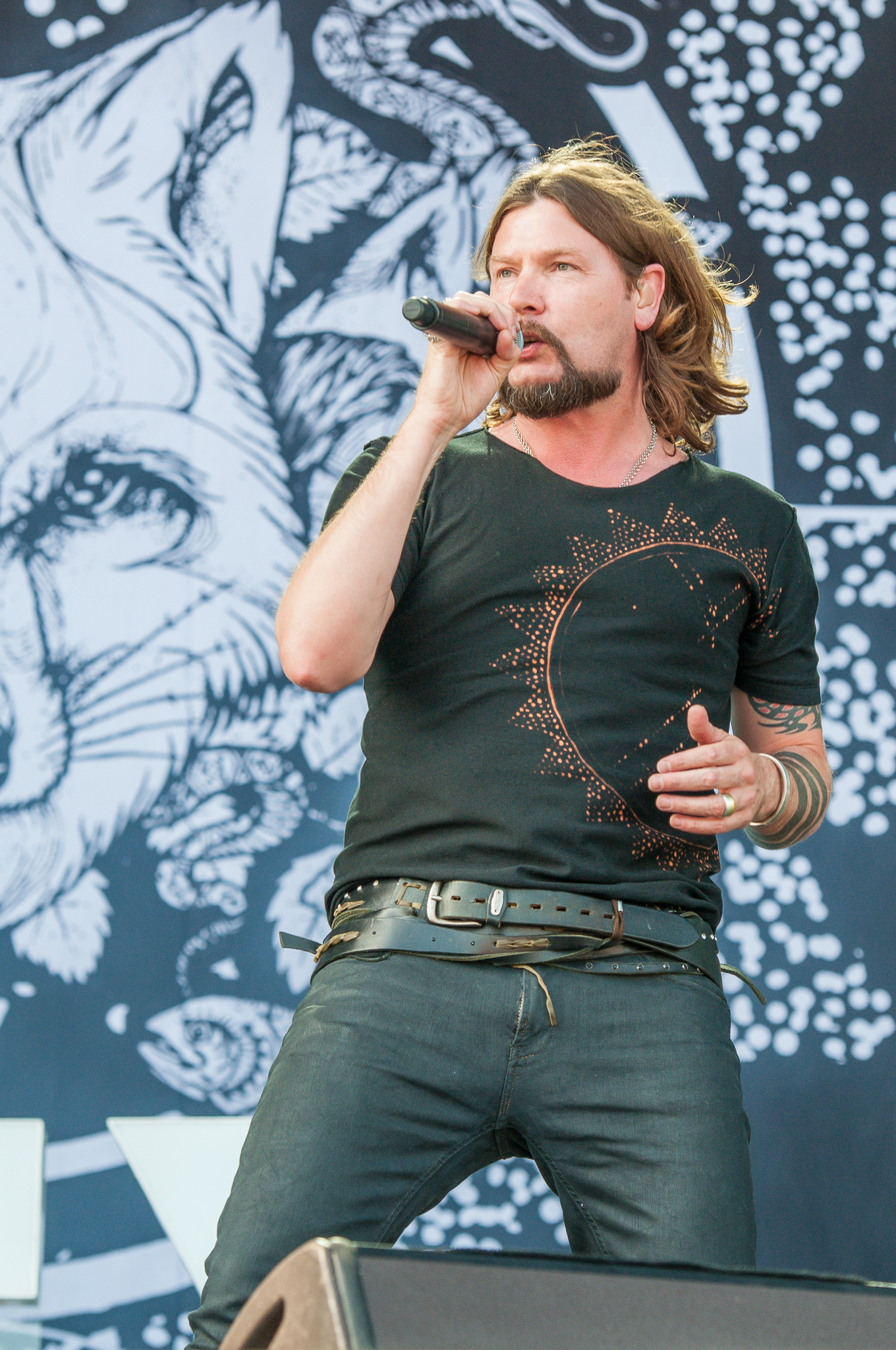
Rea Garvey

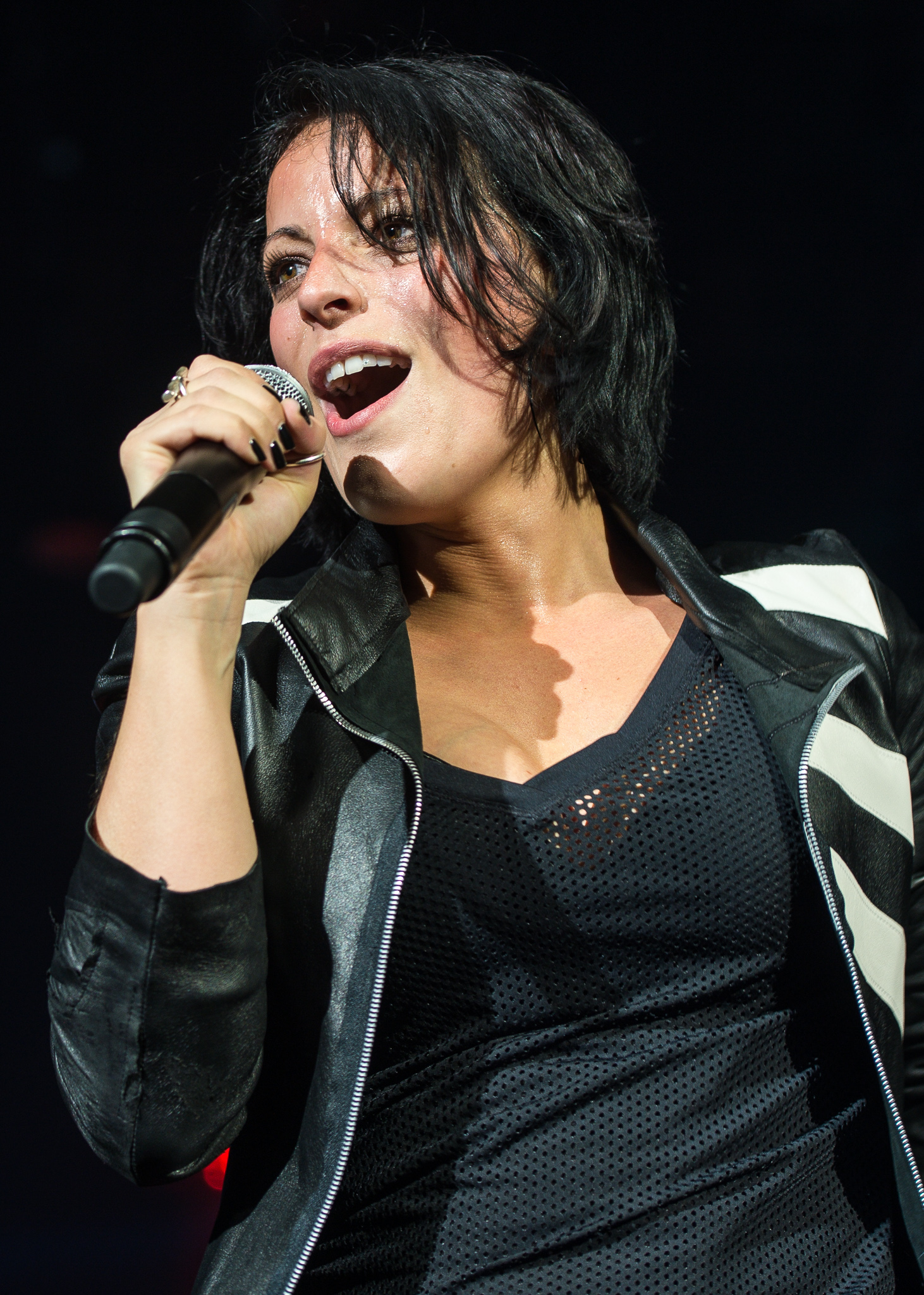
Stefanie Kloß

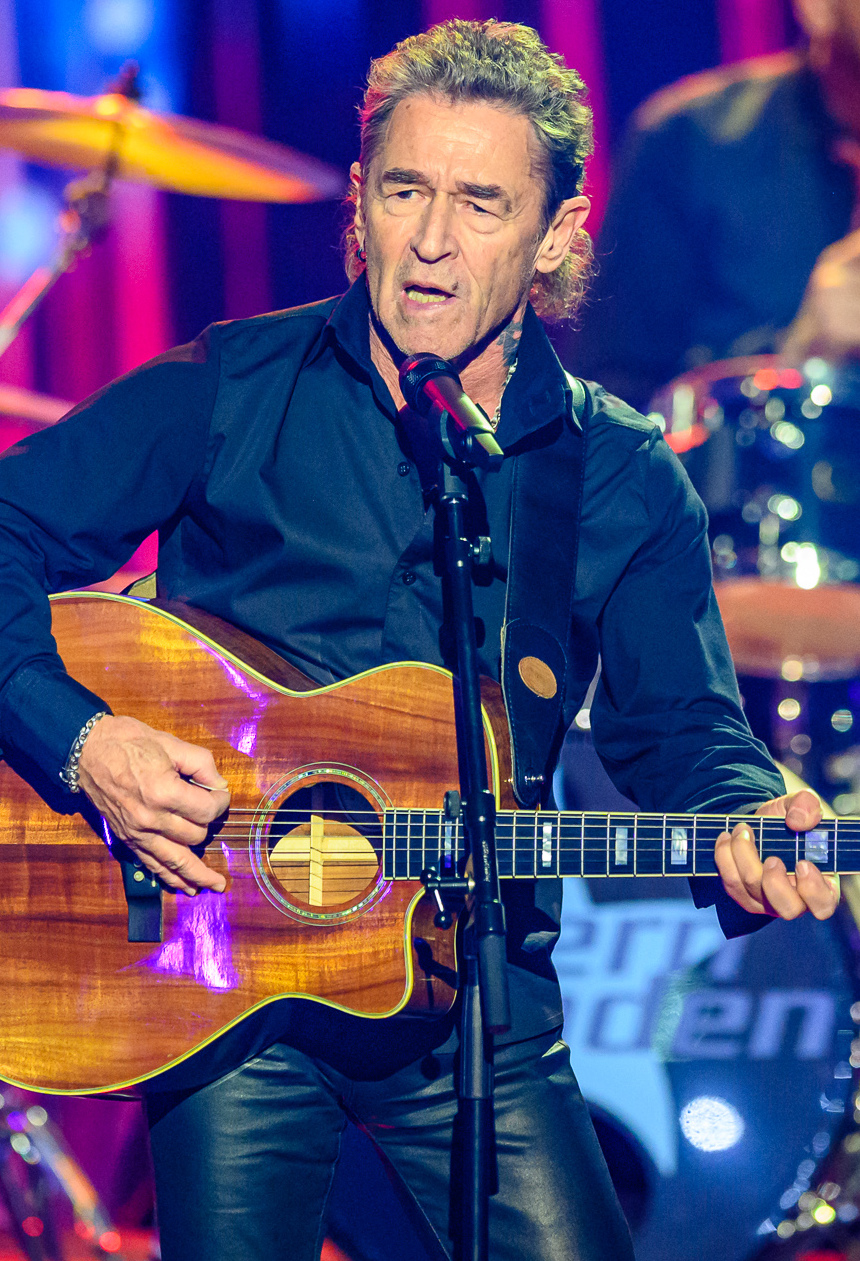
Peter Maffay

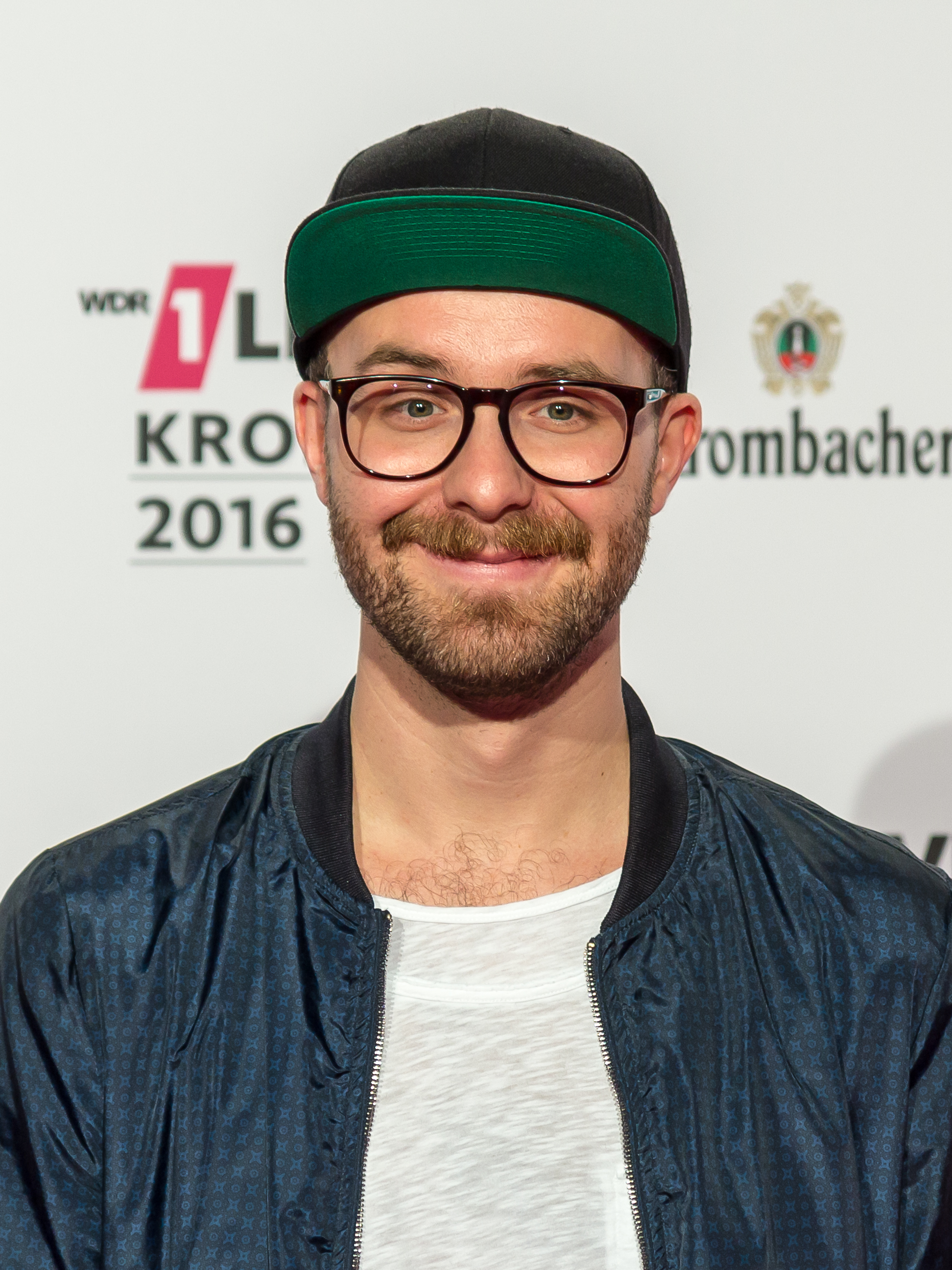
Mark Forster

On 13 April 2022, ProSieben and Sat.1 announced Mark Forster would be the only coach returning, meaning that Nico Santos, Johannes Oerding and Sarah Connor would not be returning as coaches for season 12. On 12 May 2022, it was announced that Rea Garvey and Stefanie Kloss would be returning as solo coaches after a one-year hiatus, along with new coach Peter Maffay. After three seasons, the Comeback Stage by SEAT was not reinstated this season, leading to the departure of last season's Comeback Stage coach Elif Demirezer. Hence, the number of finalists on the show would be down to four once again.

=== Hosts ===
On 30 March 2022, Lena Gercke announced on her Instagram account that after seven seasons she would not be returning to the show. On 21 April 2022, it was announced that Thore Schölermann would return as host and Melissa Khalaj would be the new host.

== Teams ==
Teams color key
Winner	Eliminated in the Live shows
Runner-up	Eliminated in the Sing Off
Third place	Stolen in the Battle rounds
Fourth place	Eliminated in the Battle rounds

Coaching teams
Coaches	Top 75 Artists				
Rea Garvey					
Rea Garvey	Tammo Förster	Jan Bleeker	Sophie Frei	Christian Torez	Yasya Levchenko
Rea Garvey	Bella Robin	Björn Meyer	Marlon Newman	Luka Maksim Klais	Sarah Alawuru
Rea Garvey	~~Kevin Tschopp~~	~~Tami Rahman~~	~~Vincenzo Rindone~~	Benny Gremmler	Lisa Pauli
Rea Garvey	Lucy Grimm	Lukas & Clemens King	Nadine Pimanov	Rina Grundke	Siegmar Meemken
Stefanie Kloß					
Stefanie Kloß	Basti Schmidt	Lizi Gogua	Luan Huber	Ayham Fayad	Paul Seifert
Stefanie Kloß	André Deininger	Jens Gilles	Jörg Lornsen	Doni Wirandana	Tami Rahman
Stefanie Kloß	Albi Rabaev	Aubrey Bacani	Bastian Benoa Rauschmaier	Dominik Puntigam	Jay Jeker
Stefanie Kloß	Leander Gronem	Nico David Anfuso	Richard Tedja	Sophie Buchmann	
Peter Maffay					
Peter Maffay	Julian Pförtner	Nel Lewicki	Susan Agbor	Charlotte Torchalla	Leo Karakaya
Peter Maffay	Sissi Engel	Guido Westermann	Katharina Merker	Kevin Tschopp	Maite Jens
Peter Maffay	Alex Ohles	Dominik Graf von Schwerin	Franziska Kleinert	Jassy Tawiah	Jenny Oberst-Harth
Peter Maffay	Katja Forg	Leona Shijaku	Michi Gallistl	Mohammad Fahmi	Sarah Barelly
Mark Forster					
Mark Forster	Anny Ogrezeanu	Bruno Flütsch	Marlon Falter	Ceri Hall-Brady	Vincenzo Rindone
Mark Forster	Anja Beck-Harth	Sid Bader	James Boyle	LIENNE	Luca Wefes
Mark Forster	~~Luka Maksim Klais~~	Christina & Dionisia Gravou	Hanna Trabert	Jerome Mitchell	Leonardo Kryeziu
Mark Forster	Luis Schubert	Nadine Traoré	Ody Patron	Renee Bludau	Sammy Franklin
Note: Italicized names are stolen artists (names struck through within former teams).

== Blind Auditions ==
The Blind Auditions were recorded from 19 May 2022 to 24 May 2022 at Studio Adlershof in Berlin and began broadcasting 18 August 2022, being broadcast every Thursday on ProSieben and every Friday on Sat.1.

In this round, the four coaches can press their buttons and select however number of artists they want to join their teams. A total of 119 artists auditioned and 75 of them got at least one coach turned for their performance. In addition, 26 artists got a four-chair-turn in this round. In addition, this season marks the first instance where at least one coach (Stefanie Kloß in this instance) do not have any one-chair turns on their teams.

Blind auditions color key
✔	Coach hit his/her "I WANT YOU" button
	Artist defaulted to this coach's team
	Artist elected to join this coach's team
	Artist was eliminated with no coach pressing their button
	Artist received an 'All Turn'.

Blind auditions results
Episode	Order	Artist	Age	Song	Coach's and artist's choices			
Episode	Order	Artist	Age	Song	Rea	Stefanie	Peter	Mark
Episode 1 (August 18)	1	Richard Tedja	19	"Home"	–	✔	✔	✔
Episode 1 (August 18)	2	Bella Robin	31	"I Surrender"	✔	✔	✔	✔
Episode 1 (August 18)	3	Juilo Noriega	28	"November Rain"	–	–	–	–
Episode 1 (August 18)	4	Julian Pförtner	22	"Shivers"	✔	✔	✔	✔
Episode 1 (August 18)	5	Lana Thieser	28	"Like the Way I Do"	–	–	–	–
Episode 1 (August 18)	6	Bruno Flütsch	26	"Georgia on My Mind"	–	✔	–	✔
Episode 1 (August 18)	7	Nel Lewicki	32	"Chandelier"	–	–	✔	–
Episode 1 (August 18)	8	Lucas Anskat	31	"Zusammen"	–	–	–	–
Episode 1 (August 18)	9	Sophie Frei	17	"abcdefu"	✔	✔	✔	✔
Episode 1 (August 18)	10	Claudia Heinken	42	"Proud Mary"	–	–	–	–
Episode 1 (August 18)	11	Sissi Engel	31	"Just Like a Pill"	–	✔	✔	✔
Episode 1 (August 18)	12	André Deininger	42	"A Whiter Shade of Pale"	✔	✔	–	✔
Episode 2 (August 19)	1	Albi Rabaev	28	"It's a Man's Man's Man's World"	✔	✔	✔	✔
Episode 2 (August 19)	2	Hanna Trabert	29	"My Immortal"	–	✔	✔	✔
Episode 2 (August 19)	3	Keno Ouzeroual	20	"Einmal um die Welt"	–	–	–	–
Episode 2 (August 19)	4	Leo Karakaya	27	"Flugzeuge im Bauch"	–	✔	✔	–
Episode 2 (August 19)	5	Andy Ellgaß	27	"Over My Shoulder"	–	–	–	–
Episode 2 (August 19)	6	Isabella Jan	32	"It's Oh So Quiet"	–	–	–	–
Episode 2 (August 19)	7	Christian Torez	25	"Another Love"	✔	✔	✔	✔
Episode 2 (August 19)	8	Melly Volkelt	35	"All About That Bass"	–	–	–	–
Episode 2 (August 19)	9	Susan Agbor	42	"You Are So Beautiful"	–	✔	✔	–
Episode 2 (August 19)	10	Charlotte Torchalla	21	"For the First Time in Forever"	✔	✔	✔	✔
Episode 2 (August 19)	11	Malte Michalek	42	"Too Close"	–	–	–	–
Episode 2 (August 19)	12	Yasya Levchenko	18	"Hore dolom"	✔	–	–	✔
Episode 3 (August 25)	1	Kevin Tschopp	25	"Hold Me While You Wait"	✔	–	–	✔
Episode 3 (August 25)	2	Sid Bader	22	"I Wanna Be Like You"	✔	✔	✔	✔
Episode 3 (August 25)	3	Martina Frank	65	"König Von Deutschland"	–	–	–	–
Episode 3 (August 25)	4	Leona Shijaku	19	"Traitor"	✔	–	✔	✔
Episode 3 (August 25)	5	Carla Pollak	26	"Tainted Love"	–	–	–	–
Episode 3 (August 25)	6	Tammo Förster	19	"Imagine"	✔	✔	✔	✔
Episode 3 (August 25)	7	Berry Bicakci	21	"Rolling In The Deep"	–	–	–	–
Episode 3 (August 25)	8	Anny Ogrezeanu	21	"I Will Always Love You"	✔	–	–	✔
Episode 3 (August 25)	9	Jacob Linner	23	"Overpass Graffiti"	–	–	–	–
Episode 3 (August 25)	10	Renee Bludau	20	"Better"	✔	✔	✔	✔
Episode 3 (August 25)	11	Jessica Ostermeier	30	"Enter Sandman"	–	–	–	–
Episode 3 (August 25)	12	Bastian Benoa Rauschmaier	33	"Der Weg"	–	✔	✔	–
Episode 3 (August 25)	13	Anja Beck-Harth	55	"And I Am Telling You I'm Not Going"	–	✔	–	✔
Episode 4 (August 26)	1	Jenny Oberst-Harth	27	"Nutbush City Limits"	✔	–	✔	✔
Episode 4 (August 26)	2	Doni Wirandana	31	"What A Wonderful World"	✔	✔	✔	✔
Episode 4 (August 26)	3	Felicia Faber	20	"Firework"	–	–	–	–
Episode 4 (August 26)	4	Marlon Falter	18	"Kartenhaus"	–	✔	–	✔
Episode 4 (August 26)	5	Jerome Mitchell	32	"Can't Hold Us"	✔	–	–	✔
Episode 4 (August 26)	6	Andreas Urbaniak	57	"The Power of Love"	–	–	–	–
Episode 4 (August 26)	7	Nadine Pimanov	25	"Dragostea Din Tei"	✔	✔	✔	✔
Episode 4 (August 26)	8	Steff Federer	33	"Every You Every Me"	–	–	–	–
Episode 4 (August 26)	9	Katharina Merker	28	"Blinde Passagiere"	–	–	✔	–
Episode 4 (August 26)	10	Luka Maksim Klais	22	"Wolke 7"	–	✔	✔	✔
Episode 4 (August 26)	11	Paloma Babativa	28	"Conga"	–	–	–	–
Episode 4 (August 26)	12	Basti Schmidt	27	"All By Myself"	✔	✔	✔	✔
Episode 5 (September 1)	1	Luan Huber	20	"Beggin'"	✔	✔	✔	✔
Episode 5 (September 1)	2	Nadine Traoré	28	"Sir Duke"	✔	–	–	✔
Episode 5 (September 1)	3	Verena Sturm	27	"Stop And Stare"	–	–	–	–
Episode 5 (September 1)	4	Sarah Barelly	34	"Ein Kompliment"	–	–	✔	✔
Episode 5 (September 1)	5	Goran Todorovic	40	"Let Me Entertain You"	–	–	–	–
Episode 5 (September 1)	6	Tami Rahman	27	"Teenage Dirtbag"	✔	✔	✔	✔
Episode 5 (September 1)	7	Fränzy Schwendemann	40	"Mädchen"	–	–	–	–
Episode 5 (September 1)	8	Lukas & Clemens King	30	"Chasing Cars"	✔	–	–	–
Episode 5 (September 1)	9	Lizi Gogua	18	"I'd Rather Go Blind"	✔	✔	–	✔
Episode 5 (September 1)	10	Franziska Kleinert	53	"Barfuß Am Klavier"	–	–	✔	✔
Episode 5 (September 1)	11	Luca Pitrolo	28	"American Idiot"	–	–	–	–
Episode 5 (September 1)	12	Jörg Lornsen	38	"Bis meine Welt die Augen schließt"	✔	✔	✔	✔
Episode 6 (September 2)	1	Ceri Hall-Brady	22	"Fast Car"	✔	✔	✔	✔
Episode 6 (September 2)	2	Andreas Böttcher	38	"Save Tonight"	–	–	–	–
Episode 6 (September 2)	3	Mohammad Fahmi	27	"Can't Help Falling In Love"	–	–	✔	✔
Episode 6 (September 2)	4	Babs Luggin	45	"Irgendwann Bleib I Dann Dort"	–	–	–	–
Episode 6 (September 2)	5	Lisa Pauli	21	"Skyscraper"	✔	–	✔	–
Episode 6 (September 2)	6	Zoé Arndt	16	"Do You Like What You See"	–	–	–	–
Episode 6 (September 2)	7	Sammy Franklin	43	"You Raise Me Up"	–	–	–	✔
Episode 6 (September 2)	8	Marina Vogel	22	"Blurry Eyes"	–	–	–	–
Episode 6 (September 2)	9	Alex Ohles	30	"I Will Wait"	✔	✔	✔	✔
Episode 6 (September 2)	10	Luis Schubert	20	"Drag Me Down"	–	✔	–	✔
Episode 6 (September 2)	11	Flo Fleischer	22	"You Let Me Walk Alone"	–	–	–	–
Episode 6 (September 2)	12	Sophie Buchmann	24	"Complicated"	–	✔	–	✔
Episode 6 (September 2)	13	Jens Gilles	28	"The Scientist"	✔	✔	✔	✔
Episode 7 (September 8)	1	Aubrey Bacani	27	"Listen"	✔	✔	✔	✔
Episode 7 (September 8)	2	Leonardo Kryeziu	27	"Careless Whisper"	✔	–	✔	✔
Episode 7 (September 8)	3	Sarah Paschke	24	"Nothing Breaks Like A Heart"	–	–	–	–
Episode 7 (September 8)	4	James Boyle	54	"Fever"	✔	–	–	✔
Episode 7 (September 8)	5	LIENNE	22	"Unfaithful"	✔	–	–	✔
Episode 7 (September 8)	6	Alberto Vasquez	28	"Magia"	–	–	–	–
Episode 7 (September 8)	7	Benny Gremmler	21	"Break My Heart Again"	✔	✔	✔	✔
Episode 7 (September 8)	8	Achmed Kupka	34	"The Wild Rover"	–	–	–	–
Episode 7 (September 8)	9	Anna Totter	24	"Bad Romance"	–	–	–	–
Episode 7 (September 8)	10	Ayham Fayad	20	"Lovin' You"	✔	✔	✔	✔
Episode 7 (September 8)	11	Marlon Newman	19	"All My Life"	✔	–	–	–
Episode 7 (September 8)	12	Julia Doubrawa	28	"Wo fängt dein Himmel an"	–	–	–	–
Episode 7 (September 8)	13	Guido Westermann	49	"I’d Do Anything for Love"	–	–	✔	✔
Episode 8 (September 9)	1	Michi Gallistl	30	"Castle on the Hill"	–	–	✔	–
Episode 8 (September 9)	2	Maite Jens	22	"Let It Be"	✔	✔	✔	✔
Episode 8 (September 9)	3	Gabriel & Suzana	18 & 43	"Diamonds"	–	–	–	–
Episode 8 (September 9)	4	Nico David Anfuso	34	"The Way You Make Me Feel"	–	✔	✔	–
Episode 8 (September 9)	5	Adrian Templin	28	"I Swear"	–	–	–	–
Episode 8 (September 9)	6	Lucy Grimm	22	"Break My Heart"	✔	–	–	–
Episode 8 (September 9)	7	Jan Bleeker	32	"Supergirl"	✔	✔	✔	✔
Episode 8 (September 9)	8	Kaya Laß	39	"Kreise"	–	–	–	–
Episode 8 (September 9)	9	Dominik Puntigam	23	"Zombie"	–	✔	✔	–
Episode 8 (September 9)	10	Mara Hoppen	24	"Still Into You"	–	–	–	–
Episode 8 (September 9)	11	Luca Wefes	22	"Marmor, Stein Und Eisen Bricht"	–	–	–	✔
Episode 8 (September 9)	12	Lars Billekens	26	"Hotel California"	–	–	–	–
Episode 8 (September 9)	13	Sarah Alawuru	19	"Where Is the Love?"	✔	✔	✔	✔
Episode 9 (September 15)
Episode 9 (September 15)	1	Noemi Muñoz	29	"Whenever, Wherever"	–	–	–	–
Episode 9 (September 15)	2	Rina Grundke	22	"Listen to Your Heart"	✔	–	✔	–
Episode 9 (September 15)	3	Ody Patron	37	"So Emotional"	✔	✔	✔	✔
Episode 9 (September 15)	4	Dominik Graf von Schwerin	25	"The Joker and the Queen"	–	–	✔	–
Episode 9 (September 15)	5	Branka Schuler	52	"If You Could Read My Mind"	–	–	–	–
Episode 9 (September 15)	6	Paul Seifert	21	"Easy on Me"	✔	✔	–	✔
Episode 9 (September 15)	7	Chioma Rabiej	40	"What's Love Got to Do with It"	–	–	–	–
Episode 9 (September 15)	8	Björn Meyer	21	"Tears in Heaven"	✔	–	–	✔
Episode 9 (September 15)	9	Christina & Dionisia Gravou	20	"This Is the Life"	–	–	–	✔
Episode 9 (September 15)	10	Jezzi Capulong	22	"The House of the Rising Sun"	–	–	–	–
Episode 9 (September 15)	11	Siegmar Meemken	57	"Was Wichtig Ist"	✔	–	–	✔
Episode 9 (September 15)	12	Mohamed Lakhdhar	28	"Treat You Better"	–	–	–	–
Episode 9 (September 15)	13	Jay Jeker	21	"Mercedes Benz"	–	✔	✔	–
Episode 10 (September 16)	1	Vincenzo Rindone	36	"Augenbling"	✔	–	–	–
Episode 10 (September 16)	2	Leander Gronem	22	"I Say A Little Prayer"	✔	✔	–	✔
Episode 10 (September 16)	3	Melli Zech	22	"Bette Davis Eyes"	–	–	–	–
Episode 10 (September 16)	4	Jassy Tawiah	21	"I See Fire"	–	–	✔	–
Episode 10 (September 16)	5	Anna Maria	36	"That's What Friends Are For"	–	–	–	–
Episode 10 (September 16)	6	Katja Forg	51	"When Love Takes Over"	✔	✔	✔	✔

== Battles ==
The Battles were recorded from July 4, 2022, to July 6, 2022, in Berlin, being broadcast like the Blind Auditions every Thursday on ProSieben and every Friday on Sat.1.

In this round, the four coaches pair two or three of their artists, depending on the total number of artists on their teams, in a singing match and then select one of them to advance to the next round. Each coach has only one 'Steal' which can be used to select an artist on another team and lost the battle to advance to the Sing-offs.

Battle rounds color key
Artist won the Battle and advanced to the Sing-offs
Artist lost the Battle but was stolen by another coach and advances to the Sing-offs
Artist lost the Battle and was eliminated

Episode	Coach	Order	Winner	Song	Loser	'Steal' result			
Episode	Coach	Order	Winner	Song	Loser	Rea	Stefanie	Peter	Mark
Episode 10 (September 16)	Rea	1	Jan Bleeker	"Shout"	Lisa Pauli	—N/a	–	–	–
Episode 10 (September 16)	Stefanie	2	Lizi Gogua	"Crazy"	Richard Tedja	–	—N/a	–	–
Episode 10 (September 16)	Mark	3	Bruno Flütsch	"Leave The Door Open"	Leonardo Kryeziu	–	–	–	—N/a
Episode 10 (September 16)	Peter	4	Nel Lewicki	"The Sound of Silence"	Sarah Barelly	–	–	—N/a	–
Episode 11 (September 21)	Mark	1	Anja Beck-Harth	"We Built This City"	Hanna Trabert	–	–	–	—N/a
Episode 11 (September 21)	Peter	2	Charlotte Torchalla	"Ich Fühl Wie Du"	Dominik Graf von Schwerin	–	–	—N/a	–
Episode 11 (September 21)	Stefanie	3	Basti Schmidt	"Frozen"	Nico David Anfuso	–	—N/a	–	–
Episode 11 (September 21)	Rea	4	Sophie Frei	"SOS"	Benny Gremmler	—N/a	–	–	–
Episode 11 (September 21)	Peter	5	Guido Westermann	"Dancing In The Dark"	Alex Ohles	–	–	—N/a	–
Episode 11 (September 21)	Mark	6	Sid Bader	"As It Was"	Luis Schubert	–	–	–	—N/a
Episode 11 (September 21)	Rea	7	Christian Torez	"Arcade"	Tami Rahman	—N/a	✔	–	✔
Episode 11 (September 21)	Rea	7	Christian Torez	"Arcade"	Kevin Tschopp	—N/a	–	✔	–
Episode 12 (September 23)	Mark	1	Anny Ogrezeanu	"(I've Had) The Time of My Life"	Sammy Franklin	–	Steal used	Steal used	—N/a
Episode 12 (September 23)	Peter	2	Julian Pförtner	"There's Nothing Holdin' Me Back"	Michi Gallistl	–	Steal used	Steal used	—N/a
Episode 12 (September 23)	Rea	3	Marlon Newman	"Cold Heart"	Lucy Grimm	—N/a	Steal used	Steal used	–
Episode 12 (September 23)	Stefanie	4	André Deininger	"Cryin'"	Sophie Buchmann	–	Steal used	Steal used	–
Episode 12 (September 23)	Mark	5	Luca Wefes	"Sag' mir, wo die Blumen sind"	Luka Maksim Klais	✔	Steal used	Steal used	–
Episode 12 (September 23)	Peter	6	Susan Agbor	"I'm Every Woman"	Katja Forg	Steal used	Steal used	Steal used	–
Episode 12 (September 23)	Stefanie	7	Jens Gilles	"Dancing On My Own"	Leander Gronem	Steal used	Steal used	Steal used	–
Episode 12 (September 23)	Rea	8	Bella Robin	"Running Up That Hill"	Nadine Pimanov	Steal used	Steal used	Steal used	–
Episode 13 (September 29)	Mark	1	Marlon Falter	"Under Pressure"	Nadine Traoré	Steal used	Steal used	Steal used	—N/a
Episode 13 (September 29)	Peter	2	Maite Jens	"Heaven Is a Place on Earth"	Jassy Tawiah	Steal used	Steal used	Steal used	–
Episode 13 (September 29)	Peter	2	Maite Jens	"Heaven Is a Place on Earth"	Leona Shijaku	Steal used	Steal used	Steal used	–
Episode 13 (September 29)	Rea	3	Björn Meyer	"Unikat"	Siegmar Meemken	Steal used	Steal used	Steal used	–
Episode 13 (September 29)	Stefanie	4	Ayham Fayad	"Sign of the Times"	Jay Jeker	Steal used	Steal used	Steal used	–
Episode 13 (September 29)	Peter	5	Sissi Engel	"Man! I Feel Like a Woman!"	Jenny Oberst-Harth	Steal used	Steal used	Steal used	–
Episode 13 (September 29)	Rea	6	Tammo Förster	"Lovely"	Rina Grundke	Steal used	Steal used	Steal used	–
Episode 13 (September 29)	Mark	7	James Boyle	"Hit the Road Jack"	Christina & Dionisia Gravou	Steal used	Steal used	Steal used	—N/a
Episode 13 (September 29)	Stefanie	8	Jörg Lornsen	"Weisse Fanhen"	Bastian Benoa Rauschmaier	Steal used	Steal used	Steal used	–
Episode 14 (September 30)	Mark	1	Ceri Hall-Brady	"Livin' on a Prayer"	Ody Patron	Steal used	Steal used	Steal used	—N/a
Episode 14 (September 30)	Peter	2	Leo Karakaya	"Das Leben Ist Schön"	Franziska Kleinert	Steal used	Steal used	Steal used	–
Episode 14 (September 30)	Stefanie	3	Luan Huber	"Without You"	Aubrey Bacani	Steal used	Steal used	Steal used	–
Episode 14 (September 30)	Rea	4	Yasya Levchenko	"Somewhere Only We Know"	Lukas & Clemens King	Steal used	Steal used	Steal used	–
Episode 14 (September 30)	Stefanie	5	Paul Seifert	"Counting Stars"	Dominik Puntigam	Steal used	Steal used	Steal used	–
Episode 14 (September 30)	Peter	6	Katharina Merker	"Blowin' in the Wind"	Mohammad Fahmi	Steal used	Steal used	Steal used	–
Episode 14 (September 30)	Mark	7	LIENNE	"FourFiveSeconds"	Renee Bludau	Steal used	Steal used	Steal used	—N/a
Episode 14 (September 30)	Mark	7	LIENNE	"FourFiveSeconds"	Jerome Mitchell	Steal used	Steal used	Steal used	—N/a
Episode 14 (September 30)	Stefanie	8	Doni Wirandana	"A Song for You"	Albi Rabaev	Steal used	Steal used	Steal used	–
Episode 14 (September 30)	Rea	9	Sarah Alawuru	"Ready or Not"	Vincenzo Rindone	Steal used	Steal used	Steal used	✔

== Sing-offs ==
The Sing-offs were recorded in Berlin from July 19, 2022, to July 20, 2022, and were broadcast only by Sat.1 on Friday nights.

In this round, each coach divides their ten candidates into three groups, in which each participant performs a song in turn. The coach then chooses one participant from each group to move on to the Semi-final, where all four coaches each have three candidates left on their team.

Last season marked the first time that the show did not invite mentors since the sixth season. However, in the Sing-offs this season the advisors were again introduced by the show. Team Rea was supported by Tones and I, Team Stefanie by Lena, Team Peter by Wincent Weiss and Team Mark by Calum Scott.

Sing offs color key
Artist was eliminated
Artist was chosen by coach and made the final three of their own team

Episode	Coach	Order	Artist	Song	Result
Episode 15 (October 7)	Rea	1	Jan Bleeker	"To Love Somebody"	Advanced
Episode 15 (October 7)	Rea	2	Sarah Alawuru	"Independent Women Part I"	Eliminated
Episode 15 (October 7)	Rea	3	Luka Maksim Klais	"Fix You"	Eliminated
Episode 15 (October 7)	Stefanie	4	Doni Wirandana	"When I Fall In Love"	Eliminated
Episode 15 (October 7)	Stefanie	5	Tami Rahman	"Just Hold Me"	Eliminated
Episode 15 (October 7)	Stefanie	6	Basti Schmidt	"Beautiful"	Advanced
Episode 15 (October 7)	Peter	7	Kevin Tschopp	"Russian Roulette"	Eliminated
Episode 15 (October 7)	Peter	8	Maite Jens	"Candle in the Wind"	Eliminated
Episode 15 (October 7)	Peter	9	Nel Lewicki	"New Rules"	Advanced
Episode 15 (October 7)	Mark	10	Luca Wefes	"Caruso"	Eliminated
Episode 15 (October 7)	Mark	11	LIENNE	"Don't Call Me Up"	Eliminated
Episode 15 (October 7)	Mark	12	James Boyle	"Jolene"	Eliminated
Episode 15 (October 7)	Mark	13	Anny Ogrezeanu	"Clown"	Advanced
Episode 16 (October 14)	Mark	1	Sid Bader	"Little Bit of Love"	Eliminated
Episode 16 (October 14)	Mark	2	Anja Beck-Harth	"Get Here"	Eliminated
Episode 16 (October 14)	Mark	3	Marlon Falter	"In diesem Moment"	Advanced
Episode 16 (October 14)	Peter	4	Katharina Merker	"Hey"	Eliminated
Episode 16 (October 14)	Peter	5	Guido Westermann	"Here I Go Again"	Eliminated
Episode 16 (October 14)	Peter	6	Susan Agbor	"His Eye Is on the Sparrow"	Advanced
Episode 16 (October 14)	Rea	7	Marlon Lee Newman	"Because of You"	Eliminated
Episode 16 (October 14)	Rea	8	Björn Meyer	"Tennessee Whiskey"	Eliminated
Episode 16 (October 14)	Rea	9	Bella Robin	"Anyone"	Eliminated
Episode 16 (October 14)	Rea	10	Tammo Förster	"Too Much Love Will Kill You"	Advanced
Episode 16 (October 14)	Stefanie	11	Jens Gilles	"A Thousand Miles"	Eliminated
Episode 16 (October 14)	Stefanie	12	Lizi Gogua	"All I Could Do Was Cry"	Advanced
Episode 16 (October 14)	Stefanie	13	Jörg Lornsen	"Für immer ab jetzt"	Eliminated
Episode 16 (October 14)	Stefanie	14	André Deininger	"You're the Voice"	Eliminated
Episode 17 (October 21)	Mark	1	Bruno Flütsch	"A Change Is Gonna Come"	Advanced
Episode 17 (October 21)	Mark	2	Vincenzo Rindone	"Laura non c'è"	Eliminated
Episode 17 (October 21)	Mark	3	Ceri Hall-Brady	"Sunday Morning"	Eliminated
Episode 17 (October 21)	Rea	4	Sophie Frei	"All I Want"	Advanced
Episode 17 (October 21)	Rea	5	Christian Torez	"Before You Go"	Eliminated
Episode 17 (October 21)	Rea	6	Yasya Levchenko	"Take Me to Church"	Eliminated
Episode 17 (October 21)	Stefanie	7	Paul Seifert	"Dancing with Tears in My Eyes"	Eliminated
Episode 17 (October 21)	Stefanie	8	Luan Huber	"Say You Won't Let Go"	Advanced
Episode 17 (October 21)	Stefanie	9	Ayham Fayad	"Drivers License"	Eliminated
Episode 17 (October 21)	Peter	10	Sissi Engel	"Run to the Hills"	Eliminated
Episode 17 (October 21)	Peter	11	Leo Karakaya	"Männer"	Eliminated
Episode 17 (October 21)	Peter	12	Julian Pförtner	"How to Save a Life"	Advanced
Episode 17 (October 21)	Peter	13	Charlotte Torchalla	"Supercalifragilisticexpialidocious"	Eliminated

== Semi-final ==
The Semi-final aired on October 28, 2022. Twelve contestants, three per coach, competed in this round and only one from each team advanced to the season Finale. Since there is no Comeback Stage, unlike in the previous three seasons, no fifth finalist was added. Also, the show canceled the quarter-final this season.

In this round, the coaches are not the ones to decide who moves on to the next round. Instead, it is the audiences who vote determine which contestants from the teams advance to the Finale. Tammo Förster, Julian Pförtner, Basti Schmidt, and Anny Ogrezeanu are the four finalists. Anny is also the only finalist that didn't get a four-chair-turn in the Blind Auditions.

Sophie Frei was initially announced to move onto the finale for Team Rea, before it was revealed that a technical error mixed Frei's and Tammo Förster's percentages on the on-screen graphic. This was verified minutes later when a notary came on stage to confirm the results. The voting results of Jan Bleeker were not affected by the glitch.

The coaches kicked off the Semi-final with "Are You Gonna Go My Way" by Lenny Kravitz. The show also invited Michael Schulte and Max Giesinger, who ended up in third and fourth place on the first season of The Voice of Germany and both started a career since then, as guests to perform their latest single "More to This Life".

Semi-final Performances & Results
Episode	Coach	Order	Artist	Song	Voting	Result
Episode 18 (October 28)	Rea	1	Tammo Förster	"Falling"	50.4%	Advanced
Episode 18 (October 28)	Rea	8	Sophie Frei	"No Roots"	16.3%	Eliminated
Episode 18 (October 28)	Rea	10	Jan Bleeker	"Father and Son"	33.3%	Eliminated
Episode 18 (October 28)	Stefanie	3	Luan Huber	"Believer"	33.6%	Eliminated
Episode 18 (October 28)	Stefanie	5	Lizi Gogua	"Uptown Funk"	25.6%	Eliminated
Episode 18 (October 28)	Stefanie	9	Basti Schmidt	"The Show Must Go On"	40.8%	Advanced
Episode 18 (October 28)	Peter	2	Susan Agbor	"Respect"	22.7%	Eliminated
Episode 18 (October 28)	Peter	7	Julian Pförtner	"Someone You Loved"	58.9%	Advanced
Episode 18 (October 28)	Peter	11	Nel Lewicki	"Euphoria"	18.5%	Eliminated
Episode 18 (October 28)	Mark	4	Marlon Falter	"Ja"	20.0%	Eliminated
Episode 18 (October 28)	Mark	6	Bruno Flütsch	"In the Ghetto"	14.6%	Eliminated
Episode 18 (October 28)	Mark	12	Anny Ogrezeanu	"Not About Angels"	65.4%	Advanced

== Finale ==
The Finale aired on November 4, 2022. Due to the cancellation of the Comeback Stage, only four finalists competed in the Finale. In the Finale, each artist first performed a duet with their own coach and then another with a guest artist.

The show invited famous singer-songwriters including Brit-nominated Calum Scott, former coach Nico Santos, Eurovision Song Contest 2014 winner Conchita Wurst, and a band Alphaville. Last season's winner Sebastien Krenz joined the finalists (Tammo Förster, Julian Pförtner, Basti Schmidt, and Anny Ogrezeanu) to perform his latest single and Zoe Wees who was a contestant on the fifth season of The Voice Kids also joined the show as a guest.

Particularly, right before the announcement of the final result, Iranian-American singer Rana Mansour performed the English version of "Baraye" by Shervin Hajipour. This song serves as the anthem of the ongoing 2021-2022 Iranian Protests, which escalated again a few days before the broadcasting day of the Finale. It calls for peace and women's rights in Iran.

Anny Ogrezeanu is crowned the winner of this season, marking Mark Forster's first and only win after being a coach on the show for six seasons and the third in the series (twice on the Kids' version). This also means that Anny Ogrezeanu, as the only finalist who has not received a 'four-chair-turn' in the Blind Auditions this season, is also the only non-'four-chair-turn' winner since season 8, where a two-chair-turn contestant Samuel Rösch won the show representing coach Michael Patrick Kelly.

Performances & Results
Episode	Coach	Artist	Order	Duet with Coach	Order	Duet with Guest Artist	Voting	Results
Episode 19 (November 4)	Mark Forster	Anny Ogrezeanu	1	"Friday I'm in Love" by The Cure	8	"Daddy's Eyes" (with Zoe Wees)	41,61%	Winner
Episode 19 (November 4)	Stefanie Kloss	Basti Schmidt	2	"Beat It" by Michael Jackson	5	"All I Wanna Do" (with Conchita Wurst)	5,97%	4th Place
Episode 19 (November 4)	Rea Garvey	Tammo Förster	3	"Say Something" by A Great Big World ft. Christina Aguilera	6	"Forever Young" (with Alphaville)	22,41%	3rd Place
Episode 19 (November 4)	Peter Maffay	Julian Pförtner	4	"Achy Breaky Heart" by Billy Ray Cyrus	7	"One Day (I'm Gonna Break Your Heart)" (with Nico Santos)	30,01%	Runner-up

Non-competition Performances
Episode	Order	Performers	Song
Episode 19 (November 4)	19.1	Finalists	"High Hopes" by Panic! at the Disco
Episode 19 (November 4)	19.2	Calum Scott & Finalists	"Run with Me" by Calum Scott
Episode 19 (November 4)	19.3	Sebastian Krenz & Finalists	"Wonders in a Mad World" by Sebastien Krenz
Episode 19 (November 4)	19.4	Rana Mansour	"Baraye" by Shervin Hajipour (English version)

== Elimination Chart ==
Coaches color key

- Artist from Team Rea
- Artist from Team Stefanie
- Artist from Team Peter
- Artist from Team Mark

Results color key

- Winner
- Runner-up
- Third place
- Fourth place
- Artist was saved by the public vote
- Artist was eliminated

Overall Results
Artist	Week 1 Semi-Final	Week 2 Final
Anny Ogrezeanu	Safe	Winner
Julian Pförtner	Safe	Runner-up
Tammo Förster	Safe	3rd Place
Basti Schmidt	Safe	4th Place
Marlon Falter	Eliminated	Eliminated (Semi-Final)
Bruno Flütsch	Eliminated	Eliminated (Semi-Final)
Susan Agbor	Eliminated	Eliminated (Semi-Final)
Nel Lewicki	Eliminated	Eliminated (Semi-Final)
Jan Bleeker	Eliminated	Eliminated (Semi-Final)
Sophie Frei	Eliminated	Eliminated (Semi-Final)
Luan Huber	Eliminated	Eliminated (Semi-Final)
Lizi Gogua	Eliminated	Eliminated (Semi-Final)

== Episode Summary & Ratings ==
Timeslot are CEST (UTC+2) for episodes 1 to 18 and CET (UTC+1) for episode 19.

Episode		Date	Timeslot	Channel	Viewers (in millions)		Share (in%)		Source
Episode		Date	Timeslot	Channel	Total	14 - 49 Years	Total	14 - 49 Years	Source
1	Blind Auditions	August 18, 2022	Thursday 8:15 pm	ProSieben	2.18	0.74	9.4	14.0	
2	Blind Auditions	August 19, 2022	Friday 8:15 pm	Sat.1	1.93	0.60	8.8	12.4	
3	Blind Auditions	August 25, 2022	Thursday 8:15 pm	ProSieben	1.93	0.62	9.3	14.4	
4	Blind Auditions	August 26, 2022	Friday 8:15 pm	Sat.1	2.03	0.54	9.5	12.2	
5	Blind Auditions	September 1, 2022	Thursday 8:15 pm	ProSieben	2.22	0.72	9.9	15.1	
6	Blind Auditions	September 2, 2022	Friday 8:15 pm	Sat.1	2.10	0.56	9.4	11.3	
7	Blind Auditions	September 8, 2022	Thursday 8:15 pm	ProSieben	1.81	N/A	9.7	N/A	
8	Blind Auditions	September 9, 2022	Friday 8:15 pm	Sat.1	1.89	0.56	8.1	11.2	
9	Blind Auditions	September 15, 2022	Thursday 8:15 pm	ProSieben	2.02	0.66	N/A	12.3	
10	Blind Auditions & Battles	September 16, 2022	Friday 8:15 pm	Sat.1	1.88	0.56	7.7	10.2	
11	Battles	September 22, 2022	Thursday 8:15 pm	ProSieben	1.94	N/A	N/A	12.4	
12	Battles	September 23, 2022	Friday 8:15 pm	Sat.1	1.66	0.47	6.6	8.5	
13	Battles	September 29, 2022	Thursday 8:15 pm	ProSieben	1.76	0.62	N/A	11.7	
14	Battles	September 30, 2022	Friday 8:15 pm	Sat.1	1.60	0.46	6.7	8.2	
15	Sing-offs	October 7, 2022	Friday 8:15 pm	Sat.1	1.65	0.53	6.6	9.7	
16	Sing-offs	October 14, 2022	Friday 8:15 pm	Sat.1	1.73	0.51	6.9	9.0	
17	Sing-offs	October 21, 2022	Friday 8:15 pm	Sat.1	1.68	0.45	6.8	8.4	
18	Semi-final	October 28, 2022	Friday 8:15 pm	Sat.1	1.53	0.51	7.2	10.0	
19	Finale	November 4, 2022	Friday 8:15 pm	Sat.1	1.80	0.52	7.8	10.0	
