= Hajipour =

Hajipour is a surname of Iranian origin. Notable people with the surname include:

- Afshin Hajipour (born 1975), Iranian footballer
- Ali Hajipour (taekwondo), Iranian taekwondo practitioner
- Shervin Hajipour (born 1997), Iranian singer-songwriter
- Sousan Hajipour (born 1990), Iranian taekwondo practitioner
