= Taekwondo at the 1986 Asian Games – Men's 64 kg =

Taekwondo competition

Men's 64 kg at the 1986 Asian Games
- Venue: Sungkyunkwan University
- Date: 1 October 1986
- Competitors: 10 from 10 nations

Medalists
gold medal	Han Jae-koo	South Korea
silver medal	Samer Kamal	Jordan
bronze medal	Tana Sinprasat	Thailand
bronze medal	Rashid Al-Owjan	Qatar

The men's featherweight (64 kilograms) event at the 1986 Asian Games took place on 1 October 1986 at Sungkyunkwan University, Seoul, South Korea.

A total of ten competitors competed in this event, limited to fighters whose body weight was less than 64 kilograms.

== Schedule ==
All times are Korea Standard Time (UTC+09:00)

Date	Time	Event
Wednesday, 1 October 1986	10:00	Round of 16
Wednesday, 1 October 1986	10:00	Quarterfinals
Wednesday, 1 October 1986	10:00	Semifinals
Wednesday, 1 October 1986	10:00	Final

== Results ==
Legend

- KO — Won by knockout
- PTS — Won by points

Round of 16
Pramod Manandhar (NEP)
Tana Sinprasat (THA)
Hasan Anan (INA)
Mohammad Ali Ghaderi (IRN)	PTS

Quarterfinals
Sanjay Saraswat (IND)
Tana Sinprasat (THA)
Samer Kamal (JOR)
Eulogio Rodriguez (PHI)
Hirokatsu Saito (JPN)
Han Jae-koo (KOR)
Mohammad Ali Ghaderi (IRN)
Rashid Al-Owjan (QAT)	PTS

Semifinals
Tana Sinprasat (THA)
Samer Kamal (JOR)
Han Jae-koo (KOR)
Rashid Al-Owjan (QAT)

Final
Samer Kamal (JOR)
Han Jae-koo (KOR)	KO
