= Ali Hajipour =

Ali Hajipour may refer to:

- Ali Hajipour (taekwondo)
- Ali Hajipour (volleyball)
