= Baraye =

2022 single by Shervin Hajipour

Single by Shervin Hajipour
- Language: Persian
- Released: September 28, 2022
- Genre: Ballad
- Length: 2:30
- Songwriter: Shervin Hajipour
- Producer: Shervin Hajipour

Shervin Hajipour singles chronology
"Close Your Eyes" (2022-2023)	"Baraye" (2022)	"Garbage" (2024)

Music video
- "Baraye" on YouTube

"Baraye" (Persian: برای, lit. "For..." or "Because of...") is a 2022 power ballad by Iranian singer-songwriter Shervin Hajipour, inspired by the death of Mahsa Amini and its aftermath. Widely called the anthem of the protests, "Baraye" received critical acclaim for its vocals and portrayal of the emotions of the Iranian people and diaspora. At the 65th Annual Grammy Awards in February 2023, the song won the first-ever special merit award for Best Song for Social Change. This award for the year's best protest song is now presented annually.

== Production ==
=== Background ===
The song was inspired by the death of Mahsa Amini, a 22-year-old Iranian woman who was arrested for allegedly wearing her hijab improperly and whose death in police custody was alleged to have been caused by severe beating by religious morality police officers. Amini's death sparked massive global protests and became a symbol for freedom in Iran. The slogan "Woman, Life, Freedom", which was used in the song's lyrics, became a rallying cry during the protests.

=== Lyrics and composition ===
A free translation of the lyrics:

For a dance in the alley;

For breaking the taboo of kissing in public;

For our sisters, mine and yours;

For a change in the minds of the fanatics;

For parents shame for empty pockets;

For the longing for a normal life;

For the dreams of the dumpster kids;

For this command economy;

For this polluted air;

For the dying Tehran's landmark trees;

For Pirouz (the Persian cheetah) about to go extinct;

For the unjustly banned street dogs,

For these non-stop tears;

For the loss of the downed passengers;

For the faces that smile no more;

For the school kids, for the future;

For this forced road to paradise;

For the jailed beautiful minds;

For the neglected Afghan refugee kids;

For this list that goes on and on;

For these meaningless hostile chants;

For the rubbles of the bribe-built houses;

For feeling peace of mind;

For the rise of sun after long-lasting nights;

For the tranquilizers and insomnia;

For man, homeland, prosperity;

For the girl who wished she was a boy;

For woman, life, freedom.

After the death of Mahsa Amini and the start of the protests, a trend began on Iranian social media, particularly Twitter, where users explained their reasons for protesting and wishing for regime change in Iran with posts beginning with the word "baraye", or "for".

Hajipour wrote each verse of the lyrics based on a separate tweet. The resulting text touches upon several issues, including low life satisfaction, the rights of women, children, refugees, and animals, environmental concerns, recession and poverty, theocracy and outdated social and religious taboos, militarism and political corruption, local corruption, freedom of speech, and the government's hostility against other countries.

=== Music video ===
The music video was recorded with a stationary camera in a portrait-selfie style in a room. In the video, cropped screenshots depicting the original tweets are synced with the associated verses, crediting the authors.

== Release and Hajipour's arrest ==
The song was released on September 28, 2022, on Hajipour's Instagram account. It was taken down from the platform less than 48 hours later, following Hajipour's arrest by the authorities on September 29. It received about 40 million views during that time.

Hajipour was forced to remove the song from his social media platforms by the Islamic Revolutionary Guard Corps's security agents shortly after his arrest. The arrest sparked reactions internationally.

On October 4, 2022, Hajipour was released on bail "so that his case can go through the legal process," according to Mohammad Karimi, prosecutor of the northern province of Mazandaran.

== Critical reception ==
=== Grammy Award win ===
On October 10, 2022, Variety reported that the protest song received nearly 100,000 submissions for a new category at the coming Grammy Awards.

The Academy is deeply moved by the overwhelming volume of submissions for Shervin Hajipour's "Baraye" for our new Special Merit Award, Best Song for Social Change. While we cannot predict who might win the award, we are humbled by the knowledge that the Academy is a platform for people who want to show support for the idea that music is a powerful catalyst for change. The Academy steadfastly supports freedom of expression and art that's created to empower communities in need. Because music serves the world, and the Recording Academy exists to serve the music.

— Harvey Mason Jr. / CEO of The Recording Academy

Answering a Billboard question about the meaning of a Grammy for Baraye for the Iranians, Iranian American Grammy-winning electronic musician and producer Dubfire said that it "will undoubtedly embolden the revolutionaries in Iran".

On February 5, 2023, Baraye became the first song ever to be awarded with a Grammy for Best Song for Social Change. The award was presented by Jill Biden in the absence of Hajipour.

In response to his win, and after months of silence, Hajipour posted on his Instagram account "We won".

=== Year-end listings ===
- Slate's Carl Wilson dozen picks of the best songs of 2022.
- 100 best songs of the 2022 by the staff of Billboard - No. 50.
- Selected as preposition of the year by Language on the Move's Ingrid Piller.
- Linkiesta's the "Thirty-Four Best Albums of 2022 Plus Two Formidable Songs" by Christian Rocca.
- KCRW's 30 best songs of 2022.
- Musikhjälpen 2022's most requested song.

=== Accolades ===
- Grammy Award for Best Song for Social Change.

== Impact ==
Upon its release, "Baraye" became an instant hit and immediately turned into the unofficial anthem of the uprising. It was widely used during gatherings, from schools and universities to streets, both nationwide and across the globe. It was broadly circulated in social media and foreign TV channels and radio stations as well. The song also served as the backdrop for several other forms of art such as video works, graphic design, and performance art. On November 11, 2022, Roxana Saberi reported the song as "the most viral tune to ever come out of Iran". Since its release, Baraye has become the single most covered protest song in Iran's history.

=== Academia ===
Baraye was played for solidarity in several events and performances at universities outside of Iran such as University of Waterloo, Yale School of Medicine, UW-Milwaukee, Chalmers University of Technology, University of Rochester, Ruhr University Bochum, Technical University of Braunschweig, Gatton Student Center of University of Kentucky and Nuremberg University of Music.

=== Politics and activism ===
- During the November 8, 2022 debate in the UK Parliament, MP Rushanara Ali quoted the verse "for my sister, your sister, our sisters" to highlight the importance of the women's right in the protests, to ask Under-Secretary David Rutley whether the UK Government would support expelling of Iran from the UN Commission on the Status of Women. In response, Rutley called the points of the question the "grassroots nature" of the uprising and reassured that, while the UK is "taking strong action against the Iranians," these points will be raised with Lord Ahmad, the Minister for the Middle East.
- At the October 5, 2022 debate held by France's Senate for the "attacks on the women's rights and the human rights in Iran," Senator Mélanie Vogel ended her speech by playing Baraye. Nathalie Goulet, another member of the Senate also used the song in her solidarity video with the uprising.
- To give "voice to brave Iranians," Senator Ratna Omidvar read an English translation of the song at the Senate of Canada on November 3, 2022. She opened her statement by saying:

Honourable senators, I continue on a somber note and wish to give voice to the brave Iranian women, men, girls, and boys who are facing a brutal regime in Iran. What better way to do this than to use their own words? These words, which I will read out shortly, were crowdsourced by 25‑year-old musician Shervin Hajipour who captured their essence and put them to music. On the release of the song, he was, of course, immediately jailed and tortured before being released again. He has gone silent, but the song has gone viral — not just in Iran but, in fact, globally. I am fortunate enough to understand Persian, and every time I listen to this piece, I go weak in the knees. I am struck by how inclusive the words are, and how they are a musical cry for justice. So here goes...

— Ratna Omidvar / at the Senate of Canada

- Nobel Peace Prize Laureate Malala Yousafzai used the song as the background for her video of solidarity with the Iranian women.
- US secretary of state Antony Blinken listed the song on his Spotify playlist for 2022 On the Road songs.

=== Sports ===
- Before and after the match between England and Iran in 2022 FIFA World Cup Baraye was frequently played outside Khalifa International Stadium bringing the Iranians together to show solidarity with people inside Iran.
- On November 4, 2022, Iranian bodybuilder Saeed Noruzi chose Baraye as his posing music while competing in classic physique division of a competition organized by the Austrian Bodybuilding & Physique Sports Federation (ABPF). He finished second in the final results.
- The song is the background music of the solidarity video published by the Landesliga Niederrhein football club Holzheimer SG.

=== Cinema and television ===
- On November 7, 2022, Hanna Sökeland, the star of the German TV show Princess Charming, published a video highlighted by the song Baraye, in which she shaves her hair in solidarity with the uprising.
- The special episode of Die Anstalt dedicated to the Iranian people with Negah Amiri and Enissa Amani as guests was ended with Baraye.
- Baraye is the background music in a video backed by Olivia Colman and Nazanin Boniadi in which celebrities such as Brian Cox and Kate Beckinsale as well as several Iranian artists spoke out on the death of Mahsa Amini.

=== Fashion ===
- Haider Ackermann, the designer of Jean Paul Gaultier's collection for spring/summer 2023 couture, selected the song for the show at Paris Fashion Week on January 25.

It's a human message. In haute couture, you put women on a pedestal, so you can't help but think of all the other women and their right to freedom, too.

— Haider Ackermann / Vogue

=== Covers and performances ===
The song has been covered by multiple artists and entities including Shelley Segal, Ana Alcaide, and Malmö Opera, and in different languages such as Italian, German, English, Spanish, and French.

- On October 29, 2022 Baraye was performed by Coldplay in their concert at Estadio River Plate in Buenos Aires and it was simultaneously aired live in 3,400 cinemas across 81 countries.
  - Later Coldplay referenced it in the chorus of their song We Pray which was first performed on June 29, 2024, at the Glastonbury Festival. The line goes "and so we pray, we'll be singing Baraye".
- Carola Häggkvist performed a Swedish version on Sveriges Television.
- On November 4, 2022, Rana Mansour was invited by ProSiebenSat.1 to perform her version of the song on the finale of 12th season of The Voice of Germany, in solidarity with the Iranian protesters. After a standing ovation which lasted for nearly 2 minutes, Mansour took a moment to draw attention to the political arrest of the Iranian rapper Toomaj Salehi in Iran.
- On the 30th anniversary of the Arsch huh, Zäng ussenander campaign, which was held on November 10, 2022, the song was performed by Iranian singer Sogand. The event was broadcast live on WDR.
- At the Kraftklub Hamburg concert on 15 November 2022 (which was held after a four-year band break), Iranian-German singer Maryam.fyi was invited on the stage to perform her cover.
- On November 2, 2022, 50 French personalities gathered by Marjane Satrapi performed the song in Persian. The music was arranged by Benjamin Biolay and its video contained scenes from Satrapi's highly acclaimed animated movie, Persepolis. The participating figures include Chiara Mastroianni and Irène Jacob.
- During an installation called Eyes on Iran held on Roosevelt Island, Jon Batiste played a rendition of Baraye.
- Azam Ali, Loga Ramin Torkian, Hamed Nikpay, Mamak Khadem, Arash Avin and Mahsa Ghassemi sang Persian versions.
- Pegah Moshir Pour and Drusilla Foer recited it in Italian at the Sanremo Music Festival on 9 February 2023, with explicatory passages.

== Analysis and views ==
- An article published by the Los Angeles Times on October 12, 2022, explored how the song "became an anthem for the women, freedom and an ordinary life". In it, Nahid Siamdoust of University of Texas and the author of Soundtrack of the Revolution: The Politics of Music in Iran compares the use of songs in past protests with that of Baraye in the uprising it was written in, and states that "no other uprising has had such a singular anthem" and that it is a song vocalized by one musician, but "written by people at large". She also writes in her article for Foreign Policy:

The song's singular overnight success is not a small achievement given the long, rich history of protest songs in Iran. Already at the time of Iran's Constitutional Revolution in 1906, poets created songs about the spilled blood of the youth who agitated for representative government and, not long after, about the Morning Bird breaking the cage of oppression, which many decades later became one of the most intoned protest songs in post-revolutionary Iran... Although Baraye and other songs of the current protest movement continue this strong tradition, they... no longer call for reforms... In 2009, many activists and musicians of the Green Movement called forth songs from the 1979 revolution to stake a claim to the revolution's original yet unattained promises. People wore headscarves and wristbands in the green of Imam Hussain and went to their rooftops to shout Allahu akbar to invoke God's help against a corrupt, earthly power. But this time around, there are no religious signifiers or any demands for reforms. If classical songs are performed, they are not the icon Mohammad Reza Shajarian's conciliatory song Language of Fire in 2009, when Iranians were still agitating for reforms from within, but his militant 1979 song Night Traveler... The state security system instantly understood the significance of Baraye as a protest song.

— Nahid Siamdoust / Los Angeles Times

- In an interview on NPR hosted by Leila Fadel, the American singer and songwriter Maimouna Youssef describe the song as the "voice to the voiceless" and unstoppable like a "wildfire" adding:

You can arrest the writer, but you can't arrest the song. It's already out there. It's in the hearts of the people. People will chant it. They'll march with it. That's exactly the spirit that we wrote this in, is that you can kill a revolutionary, but you can't kill a revolution. When I see the women singing for freedom, for the students, for our futures, this right to freedom, this right to my humanity, to be valued as a person is so powerful that even with the media blackout, they could not silence the song.

— Maimouna Youssef / in an interview with Leila Fadel

- In his essay How Listening to Music Affects Your Mood posted by Psychology Today, Shahram Heshmat, an associate professor at the University of Illinois, takes Baraye as an example that shows that music can "reflect the mood on a national level" and that in this context, "Baraye expresses Iranians' painful grievances".
- Sussan Tahmasebi explains to Chris Hayes on his MSNBC podcast Why Is This Happening that the song "talks about people's aspirations."
- In the conclusion of Fintan O'Toole's talk at Tanner Lectures on Human Values, referring to the use of Baraye in the Iranian protests, Wendy Brown disputes O'Toole's argument maintaining that the revolutionary potential of art outweighs its fascistic potential.
- In an interview with Lina Attalah done for the Egyptian newspaper Mada Masr, Fatemeh Sadeghi, Research Associate at the UCL Institute for Global Prosperity explains the reason for the popularity of Baraye:

The Islamic Republic has declared war on life, disdaining daily life and imposing unprecedented problems such as corruption, precariousness, the environmental crisis, and serious discrimination and inequality... This song, its rapid rise in popularity, and the singer's arrest demonstrate the power of ordinary people to disrupt existing norms.

— Fatemeh Sadeghi / in an interview with Lina Attalah

- The German-Persian social scientist Naika Foroutan called the song "the sound of a whole era".
- In an interview with Billboard, Snoh Aalegra said about the song:

Music has always been a healing and comforting medium, the glue to all art forms. It's so powerful to see "Baraye" unite all Iranians across the world. I think every Farsi-speaking (referring to Persian) person can sing that song at the top of their lungs and mean every word regardless of who they are. I commend Shervin Hajipour's bravery in releasing this anthem and taking the consequences for it.

— Snoh Aalegra / Billboard

- In an analysis in Foreign Policy, Holly Dagres calls the song "the Gen Z anthem" and regarding the lyrics she writes that "The needs and wants of the protesters were as simple as that but threatening enough for authorities to arrest Hajipour...":
- Karim Sadjadpour, a fellow at the Carnegie Endowment for International Peace told The Christian Science Monitor: "The single best way to understand Iran's uprising is not any book or essay, but Shervin Hajipour's ... "Baraye". Its profundity requires multiple views."
- Nick Warner suggests that if one wants to know "what is fueling the protests" they must listen to "the lyrics of the haunting unofficial anthem of the demonstrators in" Baraye.

== See also ==
- O Iran!
- Woman's Anthem
- Human rights in the Islamic Republic of Iran
- Iran student protests, July 1999
- 2009 Iranian university dormitory raids
- 2009 Iranian presidential election protests
- 2017–18 Iranian protests
- Bloody November
