= Run with Me (Calum Scott song) =

2022 single by Calum Scott and Anny Ogrezeanu

Single by Calum Scott and Anny Ogrezeanu
- Released: 4 November 2022
- Length: 3:19
- Label: Capitol Records
- Songwriters: Calum Scott; Corey Sanders; Jon Maguire; Zak Lloyd
- Producers: Jon Maguire; Zak Lloyd

Calum Scott singles chronology
"Woke Up in Love" (2022)	"Run with Me" (2022)	"One More Try" (2022)

Anny Ogrezeanu singles chronology
"Run with Me" (2022)

"Run with Me" is a song recorded by English singer Calum Scott and included in his second studio album Bridges. Scott re-recorded the song with Anny Ogrezeanu, the winner of the twelfth season of The Voice of Germany in 2022 and it was released as single on 4 November 2022. The song peaked at number 90 in Germany the following week.

== Charts ==
Weekly chart performance for "Run with me"
Chart (2022)	Peak position
Germany (GfK)	90
