= Karton =

Studio album by Mark Forster
- Released: 1 June 2012
- Label: Four
- Producer: Ralf Christian Mayer

Mark Forster chronology
Karton (2012)	Bauch und Kopf (2014)

Karton (Carton) is the debut studio album by German recording artist Mark Forster. It was released by Four Music on 1 June 2012 in German-speaking Europe. Recorded in Germany, France and Spain, Forster worked with Ralf Christian Mayer on the entire album, while Sebastian Böhnisch served as co-producer. In support of the album, Forster toured with Laith Al-Deen, starting in February 2012, and released two minor successful singles, including "Auf dem Weg" and "Zu dir (Weit weg)".

== Track listing ==
Karton – Standard edition
No.	Title	Writer(s)	Length
1.	"Auf dem Weg"	Forster; Chris Buseck; Johnny Lee Andrews	3:44
2.	"Karton"	Forster	3:19
3.	"Zu Dir (Weit weg)"	Forster; Christian Neander; David Jürgens	3:37
4.	"Wo ist Dein Feuer"	Forster	5:03
5.	"Nur Du"	Forster	3:45
6.	"Die kleinen Dinge"	Forster; Neander; Buseck	4:21
7.	"Sie ist weg"	Andreas Rieke; Michael B. Schmidt; Thomas Dürr; Michi Beck	4:04
8.	"Alles wird gut"	Forster; Jürgens; Elif Demirezer	3:32
9.	"Du fliegst davon"	Forster; Daniel Berlinger	2:45
10.	"Froh sein"	Forster; Neander	3:37
11.	"Bergab"	Forster; Martin Burkard	3:37
12.	"Du und ich"	Forster	3:16
13.	"So spät"	Forster; Engelmann	3:56

Karton – Deluxe edition
No.	Title	Length
14.	"Gute Reise"	3:14
15.	"Bergab" (Akustik Version)	2:55
16.	"Karton" (Live Version)	3:22
17.	"Du fliegst davon" (Live Version)	2:21

== Charts ==
Chart (2012)	Peak position
German Albums (Offizielle Top 100)	45

== Certifications ==
Region	Certification	Certified units/sales
Germany (BVMI)	Gold	100,000^{‡}
^{‡} Sales+streaming figures based on certification alone.

== Release history ==
Region	Date	Edition	Format	Label
Austria	1 June 2012	Standard	Digital download; CD	Four
Germany	1 June 2012	Standard	Digital download; CD	Four
Switzerland	1 June 2012	Standard	Digital download; CD	Four
