= Ashghal (song) =

Single by Shervin Hajipour
- Language: Persian
- English title: Garbage
- Released: January 12, 2024
- Genre: Indie rock; soft rock
- Length: 3:03
- Songwriter(s): Shervin Hajipour
- Producer(s): Shervin Hajipour

Shervin Hajipour singles chronology
"Baraye" (2022)	"Ashghal" (2024)	"Shabooneh" (2024)

Licensed audio
- "Ashghal" on YouTube

"Ashghal" (Persian: آشغال, lit. 'Garbage') is a song by Iranian singer-songwriter Shervin Hajipour. It was officially released on January 12, 2024, through all Hajipour's platforms. Written and produced by Hajipour, it is a soft rock ballad with electronic guitar and percussion. The song's lyrics explores Hajipour's thoughts on the success of his previous breakthrough song, "Baraye", and his arrest following the song's release.

The song was one of the most anticipated Iranian songs of the year and met with immediate critical acclaim and fame among fans, gaining 30 million views in the first 24 hours of its release on Hajipour's Instagram account.

== Composition and lyrics ==
"Garbage" is written and produced by Hajipour himself. It is a soft rock ballad accompanied by electronic guitar and percussion.

== Commercial performance ==
On January 12, 2024, Hajipour posted a music video recorded with a stationary camera in a landscape-selfie mode in a room (similar to the music video of his previous song "For"). The video gained 30 million views on Instagram in the first 24 hours following its release.

== Credits and personnel ==
Credits adapted from Hajipour's official Instagram account.

- Shervin Hajipour – vocals, music
- Ashkan Kagan – m&m, percussion
