= Anny Ogrezeanu =

German singer (born 2001)

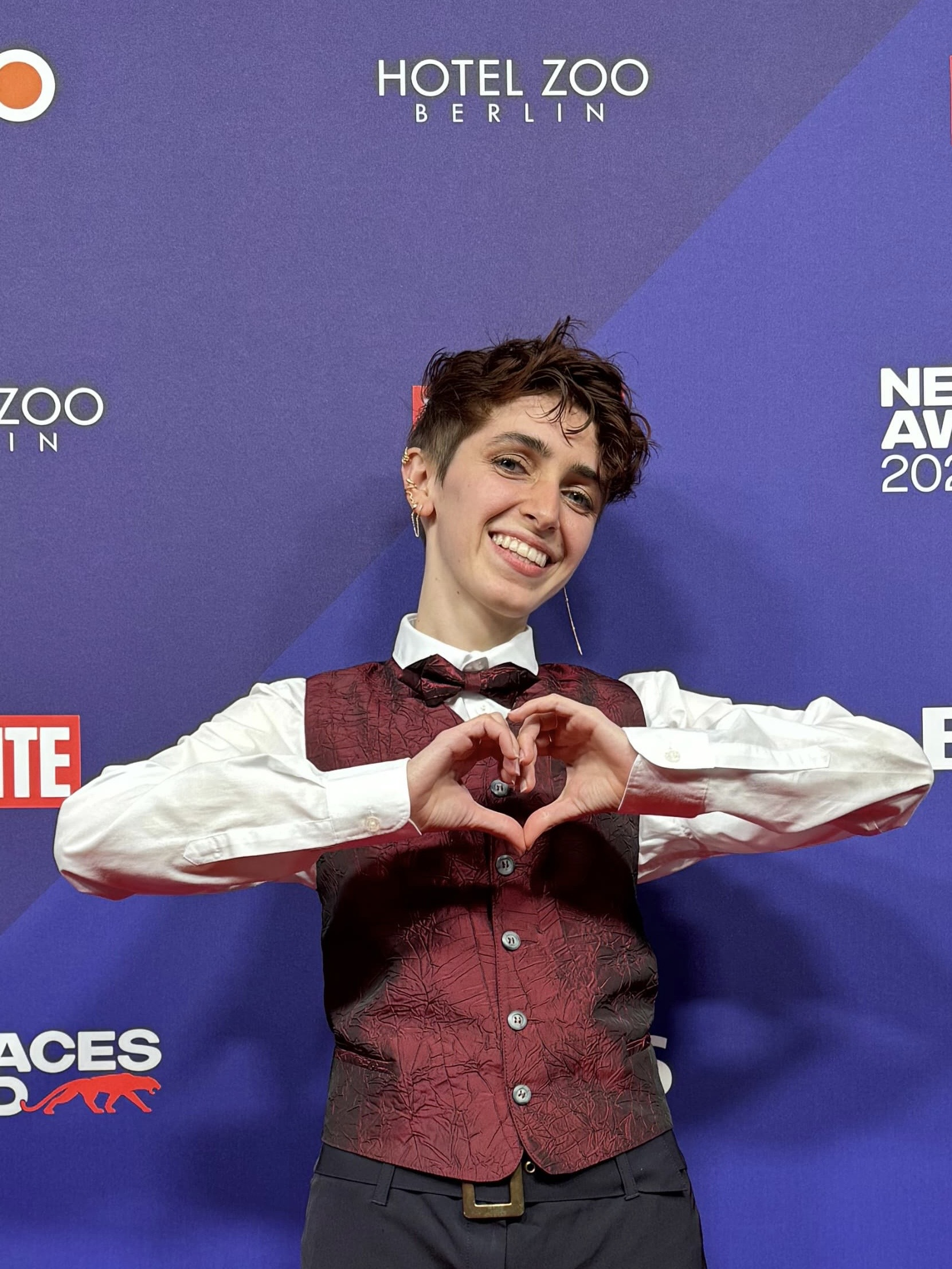
- Ogrezeanu at the 2024 New Faces Award ceremony in Berlin
- Born: 24 February 2001 (age 25); Bonn, Germany
- Occupations: Singer, humanitarian

Anny Ogrezeanu (born 24 February 2001) is a German-Romanian singer who won the twelfth season of The Voice of Germany in 2022.

== Life ==
Anny Ogrezeanu grew up in Wachtberg near Bonn. Ogrezeanu is non-binary and uses they/them pronouns.

Ogrezeanu is a volunteer in Ahr Valley which was severely damaged in the flood of 2021.

== Career ==
In 2022, Ogrezeanu auditioned for the talent show The Voice of Germany. In the blind auditions they performed "I Will Always Love You" and chose Mark Forster as their coach. In the next phase, the "battles", Ogrezeanu sang "(I've Had) The Time of My Life" and together with their battle partner they performed the famous Dirty Dancing lift. They continued on to the next round, the sing-offs, where they sang Emeli Sandé's "Clown". In the semi-finals Ogrezeanu delivered their version of "Not About Angels" by Birdy and was chosen (with a majority of 65.4%) by the audience to represent Forster's team in the finals. In the finals, Ogrezeanu performed "Friday I'm in Love" with their coach Forster and "Daddy's Eyes" with Zoe Wees. In the overall voting Ogrezeanu won The Voice of Germany with 41.61%. Upon winning the show Ogrezeanu performed and released a duet version of "Run with Me" with Calum Scott. After releasing their first EP "Dreams and Delusions (Vol.1)" in 2025 Anny went on their eponymous tour in 2026.

== Discography ==
=== Singles ===
List of singles, with selected chart positions
Title	Year	Peak chart positions	Album
Title	Year	GER	Album
"Run with Me" (Calum Scott featuring Anny Ogrezeanu)	2022	90	Non-album single
"Out To Get US"	2024		Dreams & Delusions (Vol. 1)
"Clown"	2025		Dreams & Delusions (Vol. 1)
"Light On"	2025		Dreams & Delusions (Vol. 1)
"Try Anyway"	2025		Dreams & Delusions (Vol. 1)
"Kailey"	2025		Dreams & Delusions (Vol. 1)

=== Extended Plays ===
- 2025: Dreams & Delusions (Vol. 1)

Awards and achievements
Preceded by Sebastian Krenz	The Voice of Germany; Winner; 2022	Succeeded by Malou Lovis Kreyelkamp
