= Taekwondo at the 1986 Asian Games – Men's 76 kg =

Taekwondo competition

Men's 76 kg at the 1986 Asian Games
- Venue: Sungkyunkwan University
- Date: 2 October 1986
- Competitors: 10 from 10 nations

Medalists
gold medal	Moon Jong-kook	South Korea
silver medal	Lam Ting	Indonesia
bronze medal	Katsuhiro Oki	Japan
bronze medal	Raj Kumar Rai	Nepal

The men's welterweight (76 kilograms) taekwondo event at the 1986 Asian Games took place on 2 October 1986 at Sungkyunkwan University in Seoul, South Korea.

A total of ten competitors participated in the event and was limited to fighters whose body weight was less than 76 kilograms.

== Schedule ==
All times are Korea Standard Time (UTC+09:00)

Date	Time	Event
Thursday, 2 October 1986	10:00	Round of 16
Thursday, 2 October 1986	10:00	Quarterfinals
Thursday, 2 October 1986	10:00	Semifinals
Thursday, 2 October 1986	10:00	Final

== Results ==
Legend

- PTS — Won by points

Round of 16
Hassan Zahedi (IRN)
Moon Jong-kook (KOR)	PTS
Sithikul Kitijong (THA)
Hussain Al-Qahtani (QAT)

Quarterfinals
Jesus Morales (PHI)
Moon Jong-kook (KOR)
Katsuhiro Oki (JPN)
Rashed Mubarak (BRN)
Raj Kumar Rai (NEP)
Siu Lok Wai (HKG)
Hussain Al-Qahtani (QAT)
Lam Ting (INA)	PTS

Semifinals
Moon Jong-kook (KOR)	PTS
Katsuhiro Oki (JPN)
Raj Kumar Rai (NEP)
Lam Ting (INA)	PTS

Final
Moon Jong-kook (KOR)	PTS
Lam Ting (INA)
