= Bauch und Kopf =

Studio album by Mark Forster
- Released: 16 May 2014
- Label: Four
- Producer: Forster; Ralf Christian Mayer; Daniel Nitt

Mark Forster chronology
Karton (2012)	Bauch und Kopf (2014)	TAPE (2016)

Bauch und Kopf (transl. Belly and Head) is the second studio album by German recording artist Mark Forster. It was released by Four Music on 16 May 2014 in German-speaking Europe.

== Track listing ==
Bauch und Kopf – Standard edition
No.	Title	Writer(s)	Length
1.	"Au revoir" (featuring Sido)	Forster; Sido Gold; Philipp Steinke	3:21
2.	"Königin Schwermut"	Forster; Daniel Nitt	3:21
3.	"Immer immer gleich"	Forster; Nitt	3:54
4.	"Zu oft"	Forster	3:42
5.	"Flash mich"	Forster; Simon Triebel; David Jürgens; Steinke	3:02
6.	"Hundert Stunden" (featuring Glasperlenspiel)	Forster; Daniel Schaub	3:46
7.	"Interlude"	Forster	0:37
8.	"Bauch und Kopf"	Forster; Nitt	4:00
9.	"Hallo"	Forster; Jürgens	3:28
10.	"Oh Love"	Forster; Jürgens	3:15
11.	"Geisterjäger"	Forster; Ulrich Rode	3:11
12.	"Ich trink auf Dich" (featuring Flo Mega)	Forster; Christopher Noodt	3:22
13.	"Wer Du bist"	Forster; Nitt	4:05

iTunes bonus track
No.	Title	Writer(s)	Length
14.	"Stadtflug"	Forster; Nitt	3:12

== Charts ==
=== Weekly charts ===
Chart (2014)	Peak position
Austrian Albums (Ö3 Austria)	35
German Albums (Offizielle Top 100)	10
Swiss Albums (Schweizer Hitparade)	37

=== Year-end charts ===
Chart (2014)	Position
German Albums (Offizielle Top 100)	100
Chart (2015)	Position
German Albums (Offizielle Top 100)	33

== Certifications ==
Region	Certification	Certified units/sales
Germany (BVMI)	2× Platinum	400,000^{‡}
^{‡} Sales+streaming figures based on certification alone.

== Release history ==
Region	Date	Edition	Format	Label
Austria	16 May 2014	Standard	Digital download; CD	Four
Germany	16 May 2014	Standard	Digital download; CD	Four
Switzerland	16 May 2014	Standard	Digital download; CD	Four
