= Taekwondo at the 1986 Asian Games – Men's +83 kg =

Taekwondo competition

Men's +83 kg at the 1986 Asian Games
- Venue: Sungkyunkwan University
- Date: 3 October 1986
- Competitors: 8 from 8 nations

Medalists
gold medal	Kang Seung-woo	South Korea
silver medal	Tawfiq Nwaiser	Jordan
bronze medal	Ali Mohamed Salah	Qatar
bronze medal	Rashid Hassan Bado	Bahrain

The men's heavyweight (+83 kilograms) event at the 1986 Asian Games took place on 3 October 1986 at Sungkyunkwan University, Seoul, South Korea.

== Schedule ==
All times are Korea Standard Time (UTC+09:00)

Date	Time	Event
Friday, 3 October 1986	10:00	Quarterfinals
Friday, 3 October 1986	10:00	Semifinals
Friday, 3 October 1986	10:00	Final

== Results ==
Legend

- PTS — Won by points

Quarterfinals
Jose Ernesto Roque (PHI)
Ali Mohamed Salah (QAT)
Krishna Bhakta Neupaney (NEP)
Tawfiq Nwaiser (JOR)
Fahad Saleh (KUW)
Kang Seung-woo (KOR)
Toh Soon Kok (SIN)
Rashid Hassan Bado (BRN)

Semifinals
Ali Mohamed Salah (QAT)
Tawfiq Nwaiser (JOR)
Kang Seung-woo (KOR)
Rashid Hassan Bado (BRN)

Final
Tawfiq Nwaiser (JOR)
Kang Seung-woo (KOR)	PTS
