= Maybe Paradise =

2019 debut single by Shervin Hajipour

Single by Shervin Hajipour
- Language: Persian
- Written: 2018
- Released: May 12, 2019
- Genre: Power pop
- Length: 3:18
- Songwriter(s): Shervin Hajipour
- Producer(s): Shahin Torabi; Meysam Ahangari

Shervin Hajipour singles chronology
"Maybe Paradise" (2019)	"Suitcase" (2020)

Audio video
- "Maybe Paradise" on YouTube

"Maybe Paradise" (Persian: شاید بهشت, romanized: Shayad Behesht) is the debut single by Iranian singer-songwriter Shervin Hajipour. It was officially released on May 12, 2019, through all Hajipour's platforms. Written and performed by Hajipour, it is a power pop blending electropop and dream pop styles. In the lyrics, the narrator is talking to his ex-lover and promising her that they will meet each other later somewhere else, maybe in paradise.

Music composer Arya Aziminejad gave "Maybe Paradise" positive review, complimenting the production and Hajipour's vocals.

Although all the music platforms are banned in Iran and there is no copyright law, the song has one million streams on Spotify, 334 thousand views on YouTube (Music video) and thousands of views and streams on other platforms, uploaded by unknown people illegally.

== Background and release ==
Hajipour first performed the song in the season one of the New Era program on March 22, 2019 for his audition. He received a positive reaction from the audience and was praised by the judges for his performance and songwriting. Getting the four positive chair buttons, Hajipour was accepted by the judges and made it to the second round. (Later he was eliminated in the second round and did not make it to the final round which was decided by the audience voting.)

Music composer Arya Aziminejad (one of the judges) said after Hajipour's audition that the Iranian music industry needs "non-imitative" voices like Hajipour and that "we need to combine new melodies with Persian melodies" like what Hajipour did in "Maybe Paradise".

On May 4, 2019, after Hajipour posted a teaser of the song, he announced on his Instagram account that the song will be released on all platforms on May 12 at 6 pm.

== Composition and lyrics ==
"Maybe Paradise" is written by Hajipour, produced by Shahin Torabi and Meysam Ahangari and arranged and mixed by Shahab Akbari. It is a power pop blending electropop and dream pop styles.

On September 8, 2022, Hajipour uploaded a video on YouTube titled "The incident that made me make "Maybe Paradise"". During his video he revealed that he written the song on the Winter of 2018 when he was about 18-19 years old, after he broke up with his girlfriend because of his anger issues and GAD. He said when he was in a relationship with her, he constantly was "overthinking of losing her" because of his financial problems (even though he was not that low) or if she would fall in love with someone better, so he began unintentionally emotionally abusing her by controlling her. After that they had a on-again, off-again relationship. He stated during one of their intense fights, she said "I could've been with my friends instead of being with you and your behavior" and that is where he realized that what a "shitty person" he is. Later he stated that he had mental problems and he realized what he did was absolutely wrong and that she did nothing wrong in their relationship. He said on one of the winter days of 2018, when he woke up, all that was coming up to his mind was the word "Couldn't". He ended up writing the course in fifteen minutes and later wrote the first verse on the same day.

== Commercial performance ==
On March 23, 2019, Hajipour posted his "Maybe Paradise" performance in New Era program, on his Instagram account the day after the program was broadcast. As of January 15, 2024, the video has 2 million views on Hajipour's Instagram account.

As of March 16, 2023, the song has about one million streams and the acoustic version of it has about 160,000 streams on Spotify.

As of January 15, 2024, the audio video of the song has about 85,000 views and "Maybe Paradise (Acoustic version)" Music video has about 450,000 views on YouTube.

== Credits and personnel ==
Credits adapted from Hajipour's official Instagram account.

- Shervin Hajipour – vocals, music
- Shahab Akbari – arrangement, mix
- Shahin Torabi – producer
- Meysam Ahangari – producer

== Acoustic version ==
"Maybe Paradise (Acoustic Version)"

Song by Shervin Hajipour
- Language: Persian
- Released: December 15, 2021
- Genre: R&B; Soft rock; pop
- Length: 3:17
- Songwriter(s): Shervin Hajipour
- Producer(s): Shervin Hajipour

Shervin Hajipour singles chronology
"Scar" (2021)	"Maybe Paradise (Acoustic Version)" (2021)	"After Us" (2021)

Music video
- "Maybe Paradise (Acoustic Version)" on YouTube

Hajipour released an acoustic version of the song on December 15, 2021 along with its music video. The Acoustic version received positive reactions from the fans.

=== Music video ===
The music video for the acoustic version was released on December 15, 2021 along with the song. The video which was directed by Ali Pazani and Mahyar Keshavarz, showed Hajipour walking into an empty Coffeehouse and siting on a chair while he is singing the first verse of the song. When the second verse starts, Hajipour goes to the back of the bar, holds a microphone and joins a band in there and starts singing with them till the end of the music video.

=== Personnel ===
Credits adapted from Hajipour's official Instagram account.

- Shervin Hajipour – vocals, music, arrangement
- Ali Almasi – guitar
- Ghazaleh – piano, backup vocals
- Amin Ahmadi – drums
