= Rana Mansour =

Iranian-American musician and singer (born 1981)

Rana Mansour رعنا منصور
- Born: November 16, 1981 (age 44); Alexandria, Virginia, United States
- Genres: Pop, Jazz
- Occupations: Singer, composer
- Instrument: Piano
- Years active: 2005–present
- Website: http://www.RanaMusic.com

Rana Mansour (Persian: رعنا منصور; born November 16, 1981, in Alexandria, Virginia, United States) is an American-Iranian musician and singer.

== Biography ==
Mansour was born into an artistic family, her mother being a producer and director in the Iranian National Television station and her father being one of the main filmmakers at the same television, before the Iranian Revolution. She attended the Berklee College of Music in Boston, Massachusetts, where she received her Bachelor's in Music with Honors. Before entering the music field professionally, Mansour worked for an online stock brokerage, where she prepared and audited online budgets. She released her debut album entitled Suite 16 in 1997 and her first Persian album in September 2015. Mansour has performed concerts in various cities across Europe and North America, including for the Persian Tirgan festival in Toronto and San Francisco. She has performed in over ten languages.

Mansour has a history of performing live on Persian-language television channels, including Voice of America, BBC, and Manoto Tv. In March 2015, Mansour performed the songs "Ki Ashkatu Pak Me Kneh" and "Shab Zedhe" on the Nim Qarn program with Ebrahim Hamedi (Ebi), which was organized by Manoto Tv channel to honor his 50 years of artistic activity.

== TV presence ==
- Mansour has also been seen on the hit Bravo show, The Real Housewives of Beverly Hills, performing her original song, "No Place Like Home".
- On November 4, 2022, Mansour performed her version of Shervin Hajipour's song Baraye on the finale of The Voice of Germany to show solidarity with the Hajipour, along with other arrested Iranian protesters. She received a standing ovation of nearly 2 minutes after which she spoke about the political arrest of the Iranian rapper Toomaj Salehi in Iran.

== Discography ==
=== Studio albums ===
- Suite 16 1997
- The Adventures of Indygyrl 2008
- Rana Mansour 2015 (self-titled album)
- Eshghe Naab 2019

=== Singles ===
- "No Place Like Home"
- "Sorry Baby"
