= Rashid Al-Owjan =

Qatari taekwondo practitioner

Personal information
- Born: January 1, 1968 (age 58)

Sport
- Country: Qatar
- Sport: Taekwondo
Medal record
Representing Qatar
Men's taekwondo
Asian Games
Bronze medal – third place	1986 Seoul	-64 kg

Rashid Al-Owjan (born 1 January 1968) is a Qatari male taekwondo athlete. He represented Qatar at the 1988 Summer Olympics in the men's welterweight (-76 kg) category and the 1986 Asian Games in men's featherweight (-68 kg) category, winning the bronze medal in the latter.
