= Taekwondo at the 1986 Asian Games – Men's 70 kg =

Taekwondo competition

Men's 70 kg at the 1986 Asian Games
- Venue: Sungkyunkwan University
- Date: 2 October 1986
- Competitors: 12 from 12 nations

Medalists
gold medal	Park Bong-kwon	South Korea
silver medal	Ali Hajipour	Iran
bronze medal	Monsour del Rosario	Philippines
bronze medal	Faraj Al-Fadhel	Kuwait

The men's lightweight (70 kilograms) event at the 1986 Asian Games took place on 2 October 1986 at Sungkyunkwan University, Seoul, South Korea.

A total of twelve competitors competed in this event, limited to fighters whose body weight was less than 70 kilograms.

== Schedule ==
All times are Korea Standard Time (UTC+09:00)

Date	Time	Event
Thursday, 2 October 1986	10:00	Round of 16
Thursday, 2 October 1986	10:00	Quarterfinals
Thursday, 2 October 1986	10:00	Semifinals
Thursday, 2 October 1986	10:00	Final

== Results ==
Legend

- KO — Won by knockout
- PTS — Won by points
- SUP — Won by superiority

Round of 16
Dhurba Gurung (NEP)	PTS
Kokichi Ono (JPN)
Yutphichai Janlekha (THA)
Park Bong-kwon (KOR)
Khalil Aqil (JOR)
Faraj Al-Fadhel (KUW)
Ibrahim Eid Al-Fayz (QAT)
Ali Hajipour (IRN)	PTS

Quarterfinals
Monsour del Rosario (PHI)
Dhurba Gurung (NEP)
Park Bong-kwon (KOR)
Yousif Sharida (BRN)
Agus Pakpahan (INA)
Faraj Al-Fadhel (KUW)	PTS
Ali Hajipour (IRN)	PTS
So Kam Fan (HKG)

Semifinals
Monsour del Rosario (PHI)
Park Bong-kwon (KOR)	KO
Faraj Al-Fadhel (KUW)
Ali Hajipour (IRN)	SUP

Final
Park Bong-kwon (KOR)	PTS
Ali Hajipour (IRN)
