= 2009 Iranian university dormitory raids =

The 2009 Iranian university dormitory raids took place on 14 June 2009 (or 24 Khordad in the Iranian calendar) at various university dormitories throughout Iran. The raids were carried out by the state-sponsored Basij militiamen against students suspected of having participated in the ongoing election protests.

== Raids ==
The dormitories of the University of Tehran, the largest general university in the Islamic Republic of Iran, were raided by Basij militiamen. At least 3 men and two women, were reported to have been killed or wounded by the Basij.

Unrest between students and Basij also took place at Amir Kabir University in Tehran, University of Sistan and Baluchestan, Razi University in Kermanshah, and University of Mazandaran; Ferdowsi University in Mashhad, in particular, was the scene of violence between students and members of both the Basij and the Ansar-e-Hezbollah.

== Reaction ==
119 members of the University of Tehran faculty resigned en-masse on 15 June 2009 in protest of the raid. Ali Larijani, speaker of the Iranian Majlis, condemned the raid and blamed the Interior Ministry for the raids; the Interior Ministry, in turn, ordered a probe into the incident.

The Middle East Studies Association of North America (MESA) wrote a letter to Ayatollah Ali Khamenei condemning Iranian officials for the university raids and arrest of students.
