= Taekwondo at the 1986 Asian Games – Men's 83 kg =

Taekwondo competition

Men's 83 kg at the 1986 Asian Games
- Venue: Sungkyunkwan University
- Date: 3 October 1986
- Competitors: 10 from 10 nations

Medalists
| gold medal | Lee Kye-haeng | South Korea |
| silver medal | Ahmad Ali | Jordan |
| bronze medal | Hirokazu Shiokawa | Japan |
| bronze medal | Raj Kumar Buchhe | Nepal |

The men's middleweight (83 kilograms) event at the 1986 Asian Games took place on 3 October 1986 at Sungkyunkwan University, Seoul, South Korea.

A total of ten competitors competed in this event, limited to fighters whose body weight was less than 83 kilograms.

== Schedule ==
All times are Korea Standard Time (UTC+09:00)

| Date | Time | Event |
|---|---|---|
| Friday, 3 October 1986 | 10:00 | Round of 16 |
| Friday, 3 October 1986 | 10:00 | Quarterfinals |
| Friday, 3 October 1986 | 10:00 | Semifinals |
| Friday, 3 October 1986 | 10:00 | Final |

== Results ==
Legend

- PTS — Won by points

Round of 16
Waleed Al-Hashash (BRN)
Joseph Hungan (INA)
Aied Khidr Al-Shammari (QAT)
Aziz Ghanim (KUW)

Quarterfinals
Lee Kye-haeng (KOR)
Joseph Hungan (INA)
Hirokazu Shiokawa (JPN)
Lee Yoke Keong (MAL)
Alan Lipat (PHI)
Raj Kumar Buchhe (NEP)
Aied Khidr Al-Shammari (QAT)
Ahmad Ali (JOR)

Semifinals
Lee Kye-haeng (KOR)
Hirokazu Shiokawa (JPN)
Raj Kumar Buchhe (NEP)
Ahmad Ali (JOR)

Final
Lee Kye-haeng (KOR) | PTS
Ahmad Ali (JOR)
