= Mark Forster (singer) =

German singer (born 1983)

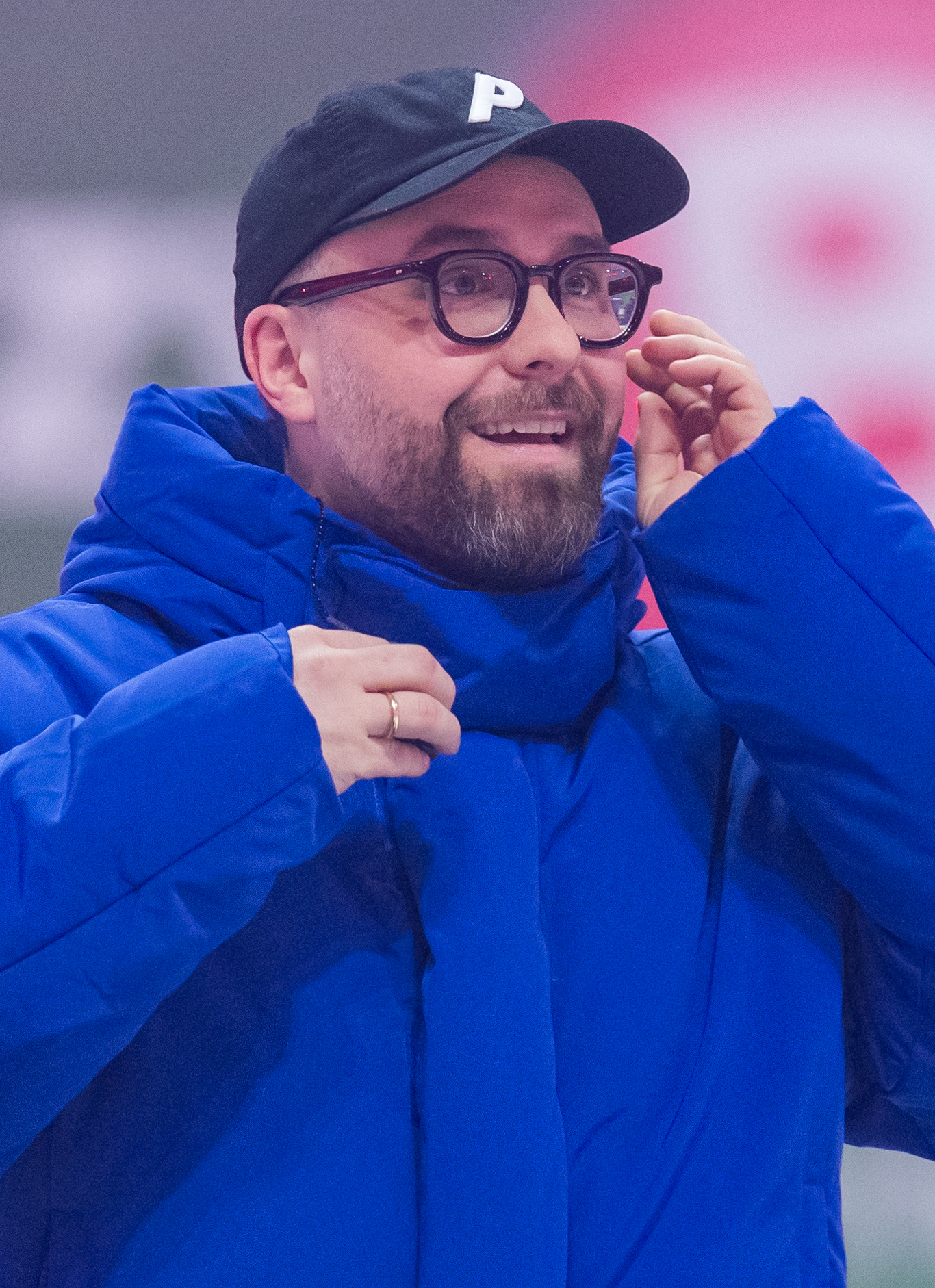
- Forster in 2024

Background information
- Born: Mark Ćwiertnia; 11 January 1983 (age 43); Kaiserslautern, West Germany
- Genre: Pop
- Occupations: Singer, songwriter
- Years active: 2012–present
- Spouse: Lena Meyer-Landrut
- Website: markforster.de

Mark Ćwiertnia (born 11 January 1983), known professionally as Mark Forster or Marky for short, is a German singer, songwriter and television personality. He is known for his albums, Karton, Bauch und Kopf, and Eff, collaborations for other artists and work for TV. In addition to his music career, Forster appeared as a coach on the reality competition show The Voice of Germany from 2017 to 2022, and again in 2024. Forster's team was victorious in 2022 with winner Anny Ogrezeanu being mentored by him.

== Early life ==
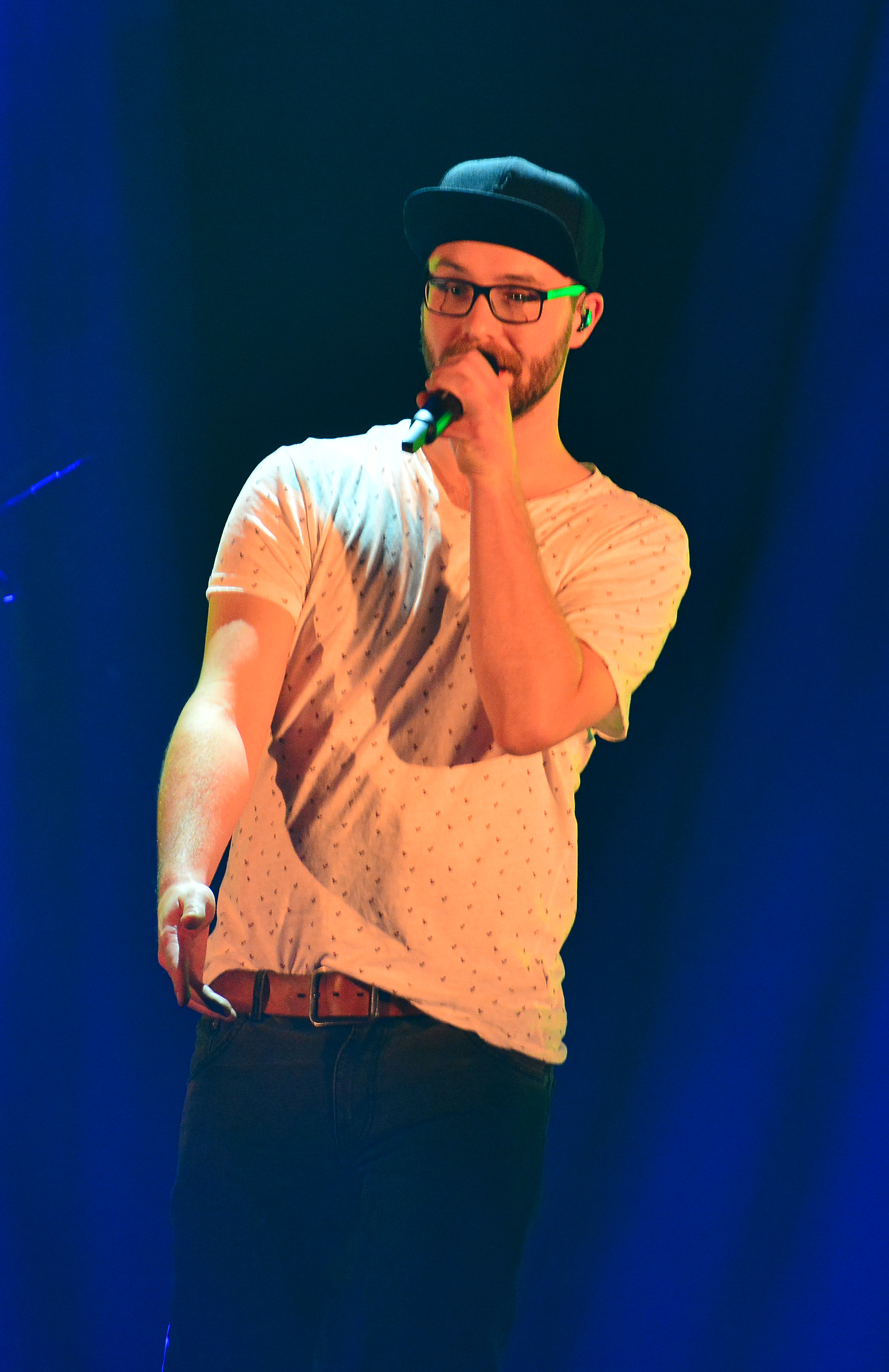
Forster performing in 2015

Born in 1983 in Kaiserslautern, Forster is of mixed German and Polish descent. His German father was born in Dortmund and his Polish mother, Agnieszka Ćwiertnia, was born in Warsaw. His father walked out of the family, and his mother raised him, calling him "Marek". As a result, in his early days as a musician he used the name Marek Ćwiertnia. He grew up in Winnweiler, near Kaiserslautern of Rhineland-Palatinate in Germany. After moving to Berlin, Forster discontinued the professional use of his Slavic birth surname, Ćwiertnia, choosing to go by "Forster" instead.

== Career ==
In Berlin, he developed a career as a singer, songwriter, pianist and composer of jingles for television including for the show Krömer – Die Internationale Show.

In 2006, Forster joined the band Balboa as their frontman. He was also in Kurt Krömer's Kröm De La Kröm alongside musician Mitumba Lumbumba. From 2007 to 2010, Forster accompanied actor and comedian Kurt Krömer as a pianist sidekick.

=== Karton ===
In 2010 was signed to German record label Four Music where he released his album Karton in 2012. The album was produced by Ralf Christian Mayer and coproduced by Sebastian Böhnisch and recorded in Germany, France and Spain. He toured starting February 2012 with Laith Al-Deen and promoted his album. Two minor singles from the album were released: "Auf dem Weg" and "Zu dir (weit weg)".

=== Head and heart ===
In November 2013, he was featured in the rapper Sido's hit "Einer dieser Steine", singing in the refrain. An even bigger hit for Forster was "Au revoir", this time with roles reversed—Forster listed as primary artist and featuring Sido—with this single being a prelude to the very successful album Bauch und Kopf in 2013. The album was certified gold and included the now-smash-hit "Au revoir" and two other follow-up hit singles, "Flash mich" and the title track "Bauch und Kopf", the latter of which won Bundesvision Song Contest 2015.

=== Eff ===
In 2015, Forster became vocalist for the musical project Eff, made up of Forster as vocalist and Felix Jaehn as DJ and music producer. The two met at an event in Vienna in 2015. Eff is a reference to Felix and Forster. Their debut single, "Stimme", topped the German Singles Chart for three consecutive weeks, also charting in Austria and Switzerland.

=== The Voice (Germany) ===
Forster made his debut on The Voice of Germany in 2017 and continued to serve as coach until 2022, where he coached the winner Anny Ogrezeanu in the same year. In 2024, it was announced that Forster would be rejoining The Voice of Germany, alongside Samu Haber, Yvonne Catterfeld and new coach Kamrad.

== Personal life ==
Forster is a fan of the German football club 1. FC Kaiserslautern. He speaks both German and Polish.

== Discography ==
=== Albums ===
List of albums, with selected chart positions, sales figures and certifications
Title	Album details	Peak chart positions			Certifications
Title	Album details	GER	AUT	SWI	Certifications
Karton	Released: 1 June 2012; Label: Four Music	45	—	—	GER: Gold
Bauch und Kopf	Released: 16 May 2014; Label: Four Music	10	35	37	GER: 2× Platinum
Tape	Released: 3 June 2016; Label: Four Music	2	2	7	GER: 2× Platinum; AUT: Platinum; SWI: Platinum
Liebe	Released: 16 November 2018; Label: Four Music	3	5	8	GER: Gold; AUT: Gold; SWI: Gold
Musketiere	Released: 13 August 2021; Label: Four Music	2	4	3	
Supervision	Released: 20 October 2023; Label: Four Music	3	9	16	

=== Singles ===
Year	Title	Peak positions			Certifications	Album
Year	Title	GER	AUT	SWI	Certifications	Album
2012	"Auf dem Weg"	49	—	—		Karton
2012	"Zu dir (weit weg)"	64	—	—		Karton
2014	"Au revoir" (featuring Sido)	2	2	6	GER: Diamond; AUT: Gold; SWI: Platinum	Bauch und Kopf
2014	"Flash mich"	11	10	—	GER: Platinum	Bauch und Kopf
2015	"Bauch und Kopf"	15	59	—	GER: Gold	Bauch und Kopf
2016	"Wir sind groß"	3	18	16	GER: Platinum; AUT: Gold; SWI: Platinum	Tape
2016	"Chöre"	2	2	7	GER: Platinum; AUT: Gold; SWI: Platinum	Tape
2017	"Sowieso"	22	7	23	GER: Platinum; AUT: Gold; SWI: Gold	Tape
2017	"Kogong"	34	7	9	GER: Gold; AUT: Gold; SWI: Gold	Tape
2018	"Like a Lion" (featuring Gentleman)	38	—	64		Non-album single
2018	"Einmal"	24	39	56	GER: Gold; SWI: Gold	Liebe
2019	"747"	—	—	—		Liebe
2019	"194 Länder"	13	19	61	GER: Platinum; SWI: Platinum	Liebe
2019	"Wie früher mal Dich"	—	—	—		Liebe
2020	"Übermorgen"	7	10	18	GER: 3× Gold; AUT: Platinum; SWI: Platinum	Musketiere
2020	"Bist du okay" (with Vize)	11	46	55	GER: Gold; AUT: Gold	Musketiere
2021	"Ich frag die Maus"	88	—	—		Non-album single
2021	"Drei Uhr nachts" (featuring Lea)	15	32	68	GER: Platinum; AUT: Platinum	Musketiere
2021	"Musketiere"	—	—	—		Musketiere
2022	"Memories & Stories"	93	—	—		Non-album single

Featured in

Year	Title	Peak positions			Certifications	Album
Year	Title	GER	AUT	SWI	Certifications	Album
2013	"Ich und du" (Anna Depenbusch feat. Mark Forster)	—	—	—		Non-album single
2013	"Einer dieser Steine" (Sido featuring Mark Forster)	4	12	8	GER: Gold	30-11-80
2014	"Camouflage" (Nazar featuring Mark Forster)	—	—	—		Camouflage
2015	"Maniac" (Victoria Conrady featuring Mark Forster)	99	—	—		Dein Song 2015
2017	"Das Original" (Prinz Pi featuring Mark Forster)	59	—	—		Nichts war umsonst
2019	"Warte mal" (Fidi Steinbeck featuring Mark Forster)	—	—	71		Non-album single
