= Karim Sadjadpour =

American policy analyst

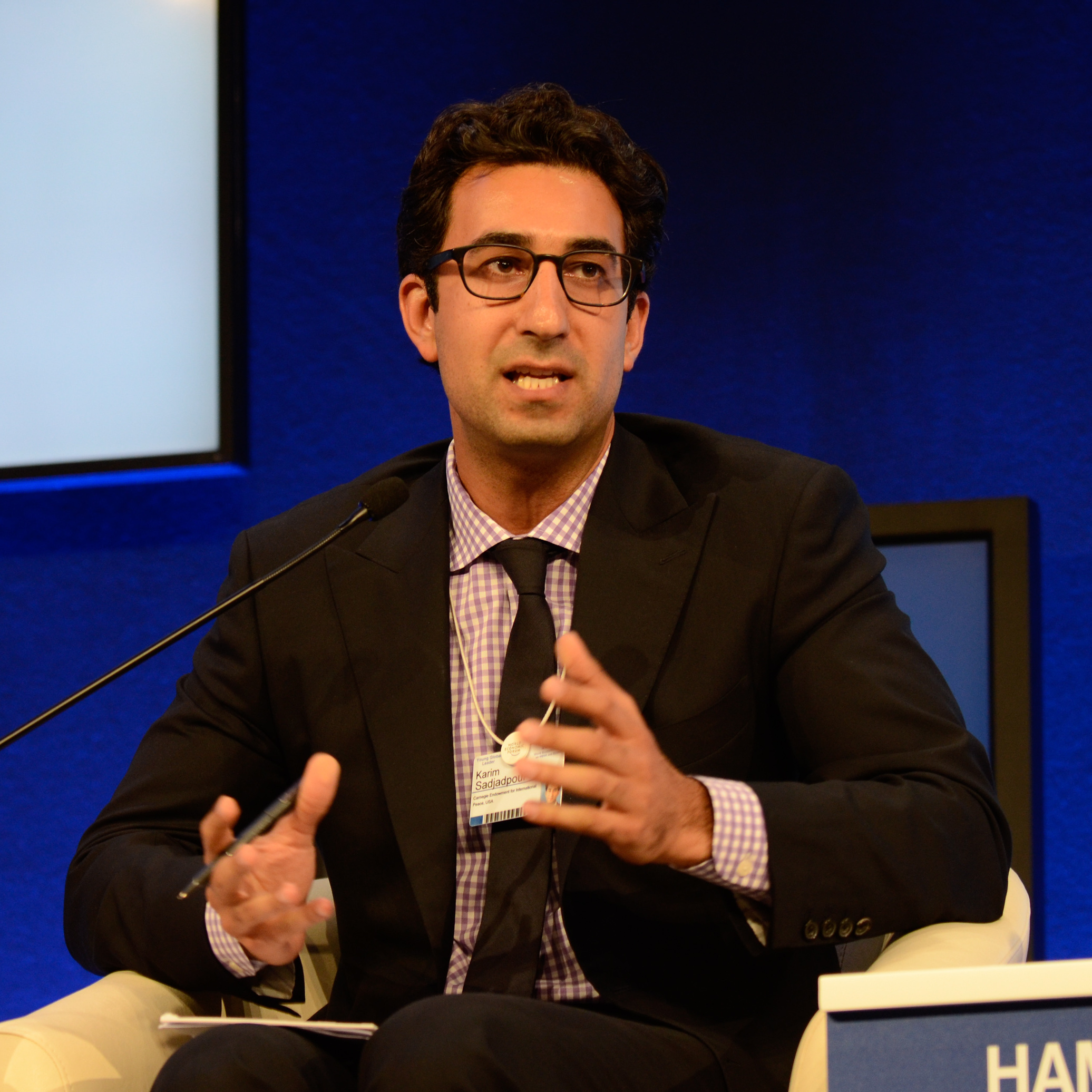
- Sadjadpour in 2012
- Born: Midland, Michigan, U.S.
- Education: University of Michigan (B.A.); Johns Hopkins University (M.A.)
- Occupation: Policy analyst
- Known for: Iran expertise

Karim Sadjadpour is an American policy analyst at the Carnegie Endowment for International Peace based in Washington D.C. Previously, he was an analyst at the International Crisis Group. He is known for his expertise on Iran, and contributes frequently to public affairs programs on television and podcasts, newspaper opinion pages, magazines, and U.S. Congressional hearings.

== Early life and education ==
Sadjadpour was born to Iranian parents in Midland, Michigan, where he was raised. As a frequent newspaper reader in highschool, he developed a keen interest in international relations, and became an exchange student in Veracruz, Mexico. In college, he spent his junior year in Italy; after graduation, he travelled the world under an award from the Circumnavigation Club, followed by employment at the National Geographic.

Sadjadpour graduated from Midland High School in 1995, received a B.A. at the University of Michigan, and an M.A. at the Paul H. Nitze School of Advanced International Studies of Johns Hopkins University in Bologna, Italy.

== Career ==
Sadjadpour joined the Middle East and Nonproliferation programs of the Carnegie Endowment for International Peace in 2007 after four years as an Iran analyst at the International Crisis Group where, as a fluent Farsi speaker based in Tehran, he had conducted interviews with hundreds of Iranian leaders, including senior officials, clerics, businessmen, intellectuals, dissidents, and activists.

He has received a number of awards, including selection as a Young Global Leader by the World Economic Forum in Davos, a Fulbright scholarship, an Emmy Award as a Consulting Producer for the HBO documentary Hostages by the National Television Academy in 2023, and writer of a best essay of 2024 and 2025 by Foreign Affairs. As a distinguished expert on Iran, he participated in the exclusive Bilderberg Meetings in 2015 and 2018.

He has testified often before the U.S. Congress, has made numerous presentations recorded on C-SPAN, and has lectured at Harvard, Stanford, and U.C.Berkeley. He has presented in meetings sponsored by the Carnegie Endowment, the Middle East Policy Council, the Washington Institute, the Cleveland Clinic, the 92nd Street Y, and the Center on Global Energy Policy.

Sadjadpour published guidelines for approaching Iran in 2007, an extensive profile of Iran's Supreme Leader Ayatollah Ali Khamenei in 2008, and has contributed to publications such as The Economist, The Washington Post, The New York Times, The Atlantic, Foreign Affairs, Time, and Internationale Politik Quarterly.

On television, he has appeared on NBC's Meet the Press, CBS's Face the Nation, ABC's This Week and NewsLive, Fox News's Special Report, MS Now's Morning Joe and Reports, CNBC's News Alert and Squawk Box, CNN's Anderson Cooper 360 Degrees, Fareed Zakaria GPS, Amanpour, The Source with Kaitlin Collins, CNN International, and Outfront, PBS's NewsHour and Washington Week, Bloomberg's Balance of Power, and Al-Jazeera's NewsHour.

On radio, he has appeared on NPR's All Things Considered, Fresh Air, Morning Edition, and Throughline.

On podcasts, he has appeared on Call me Back Podcast - with Dan Senor, Charlie Rose, The Common Good, The Council on Foreign Relations, The David Frum Show, The Free Press, The Foreign Affairs Interview, Foreign Policy Live, GZERO Media, Hugh Hewett, The Long Game, Making Sense, Plain English, The Prof G Market, The Prof G Pod, The Rest is Politics, Slate, Stay Tuned with Preet Bharara, Talking Feds with Harry Litman, and The World Unpacked.

== Personal life ==
Karim Sadjadpour's parents left Iran prior to the Iranian Revolution. His father was a neurologist who emigrated from Iran to the United States in the 1950s, and his mother came to the United States in the 1960s. Sadjadpour has personally known Crown Prince Reza Pahlavi for decades and considers him a friend.

== Chronology ==
The table below lists Sadjadpour's publications, presentations, and interviews, organized by year. Item m.d in the table was published on day d of month m. A reference to a list of items is replicated in each year for which the list contains an item, prefixed by an asterisk ("*"). A site listed in External links provides chronological access to a full database of his work from 2007 to the present.

Publications, presentations, and interviews, by year
year	2004-2009	2010-2019	2020-2026
20x0		2.25 6.13* 6.18* 7.12 8.17* 8.17* 8.24* 9.23*	1.5 1.8 1.9* 1.23
20x1		3.5* 3.8 3‑4* 4.1* 7.13 11.13 12.18*	3.30 6.20* 6.23
20x2		1.29 2.14 3.3 3.28 6.4 6.12* 6.18 7.30* 8.19* 9.17	3‑4* 4.25* 6.25 6.25 6.30* 8.12* 10.12 10.14 12.12*
20x3		2.7 6.7 6.17 6.23* 9.19 11.25	2.27 9.12*
20x4	2.3* 10.3* 10.13* 12.4*	1.14* 7.15* 10.29* 11.21*	5.8* 6.8 7.9 10.24* 11‑12*
20x5	6.27* 12.23*	1.28 3.2 3.31* 7.14* 8.27*	3.14 4.14 5.14 6.13 6.18 6.18 6.20 6.22 6.22 6.23 6.23* 6.28 7.3 11.4 11.4* 11‑12*
20x6	4.24* 6.18 8.3*	1.16 2.6 3.7 3.10 3.31 8.7* 7.14* 8.8* 11.8*	1.5 1.10* 1.12 1.12 1.13 1.13 1.13 1.13* 1.15 1.16* 1.21 1.27 1.27* 1.29 1.31 1.31* 2.2 2.2 2.10 2.27 2.28 2.28 2.28* 2.28* 2.28* 3.1 3.2 3.3 3.4* 3.5 3.5 3.6 3.6 3.6 3.10* 3.12 3.15 3.16 3.17 3.17 3.19 3.23* 3.29 4.1 4.7* 4.10 4.10* 4.15 4.21 4.21 4.22 5.17* 5.26 5.29* 6.15 6.15 6.16 6.16 6.19 6.20* 6.23 7.6 8.3 8.4 8.25
20x7	3.28 3.30* 4.4 4.5* 6.9 6.18 6.29 8.3* 8.21 9.24 9.27 10.15 10.26 10.30 11.2	1.1 1.9* 2.3 2.3* 2.9* 3.17 6.18* 12.31*	
20x8	3 7.10*	1.10 4.16* 5.29* 6.20	
20x9	3.3 6.14* 6.23 6.25 7.22 7.22 10.13	3.7* 3.25* 4.29* 4.29* 6.21* 10.3*	
