= Shervin Hajipour =

Iranian singer-songwriter (born 1997)

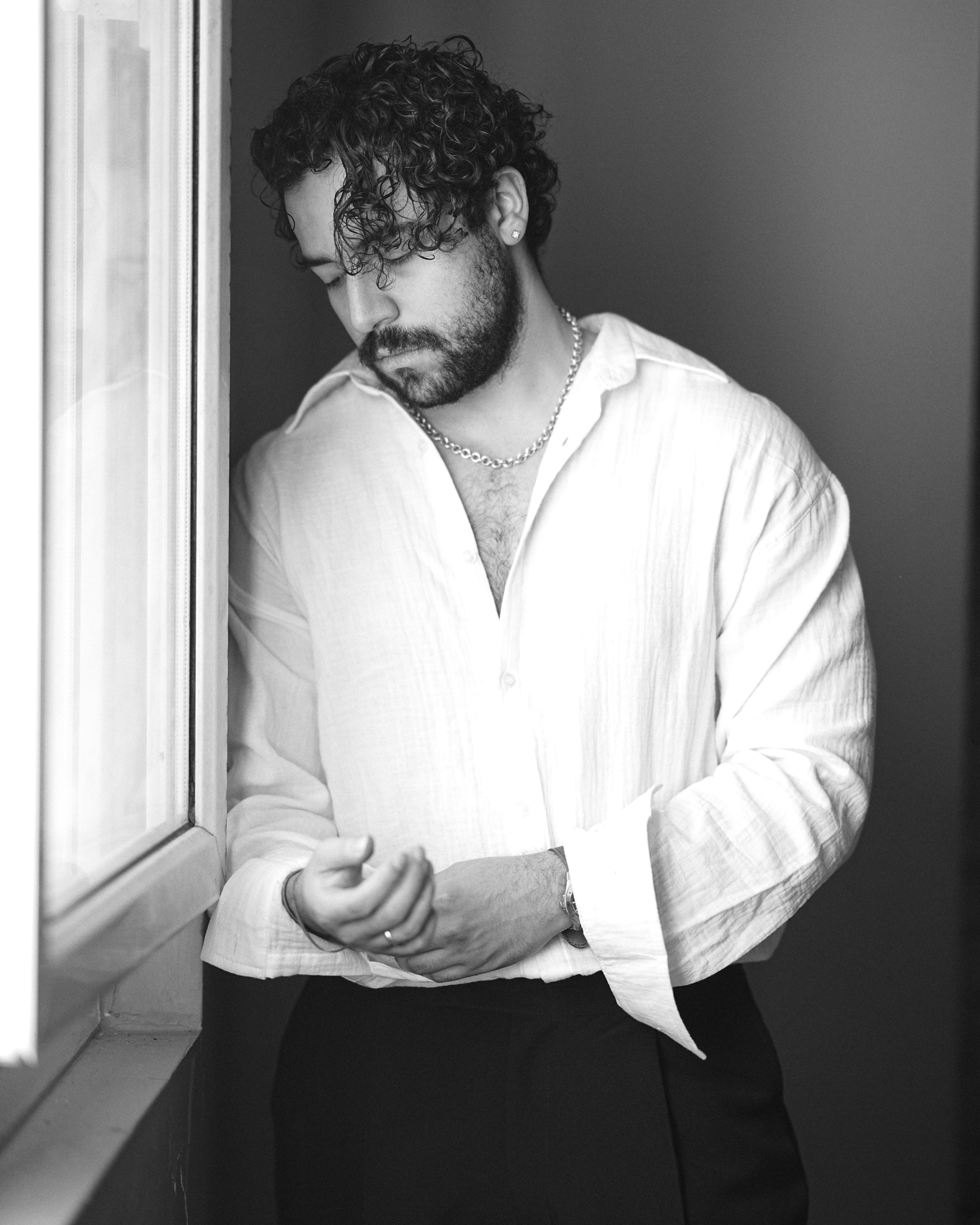
- Hajipour pictured by Hossein Ronaghi
- Born: Shervin Haji Aghapour; 30 March 1997 (age 29); Babolsar, Mazandaran, Iran
- Education: University of Mazandaran
- Occupations: Singer-songwriter; producer
- Years active: 2018–present
- Known for: "Baraye"
- Notable work: Discography
- Awards: Grammy Award for Best Song for Social Change
- Musical career
- Genres: Pop; soft rock; R&B; ballad; alternative
- Instruments: Vocals; guitar; piano; Violin

Shervin Haji Aghapour (Persian: شروین حاجی‌ آقاپور; born 30 March 1997) is an Iranian singer-songwriter. Born in Babolsar, he began posting covers to his social media in late 2018. After auditioning in New Era television show on 22 March 2019 with "Maybe Paradise", he released the song as his debut single on all platforms and gained recognition among the younger Iranian generation. Hajipour rose to fame after the release of his single "Baraye" which has been described as "the anthem" of the 2022 protests. In 2023, he won the first Grammy Award for Best Song for Social Change at the 65th Annual Grammy Awards for "Baraye".

Time magazine named him one of the 100 most influential people in the world in 2023.

On 1 March 2024, Hajipour was sentenced to 3 years and 8 months of jail and ordered to write anti-America-Aggression music because of "Baraye", a song that won Best Song for Social Change at the 65th Annual Grammy Awards.

== Early life and education ==
Shervin Haji Aghapour was born on 30 March 1997, in Babolsar, Mazandaran. He took up music at the age of eight, when he entered a violin class. In secondary school, he started to compose professionally. He attended the University of Mazandaran, where he obtained a bachelor's degree in economics. While at university, he composed music for theatre performances and editing. He later began to sing himself.

== Career ==
At the age of 22, Hajipour participated in New Era, a TV Talent show competition (produced by Ehsan Alikhani), where he advanced to the finals of the second round of its first season.

During the 2022 protests in Iran, sparked by the death of Iranian Mahsa Amini, Hajipour published his new song "Baraye..." (Persian: برای, For...; Because of...). Written in support of the protests, the song's lyrics were drawn from posts written by protesters and their supporters starting with the word Baraye..., and references the slogan "Zan, Zendegi, Âzâdi". He posted "Baraye" to his Instagram, where it received more than 40 million views in less than two days. Other Iranian social media users posted their own videos of singing or playing the song in public.

On 29 September 2022 Hajipour was arrested for his song "Baraye", and was forced to remove the song from his social media platforms by the IRGC's security agents shortly after his arrest. His arrest garnered criticism from multiple Iranians and musicians, including Murat Boz, Mohammad Esfahani, Rana Mansour, Karim Sadjadpour, and Roger Waters. Tasnim News Agency, affiliated to the IRGC, posted an edited version of the video clip, with images showing the Republic's achievements instead of the original ones. Following Hajipour's arrest, many social media users nominated "Baraye" for the National Academy of Recording Arts and Sciences' Grammy Awards new category "Best Song for Social Change".

On 4 October 2022, Hajipour was released on bail "so that his case can go through the legal process," according to Mohammad Karimi, prosecutor of the northern province of Mazandaran. Hajipour then posted on Instagram that the song was regrettably being used by political groups outside Iran; activists believe this statement may have been coerced.

Shervin Hajipour received the Special Merit Award for Best Song for Social Change for "Baraye" at the 2023 Grammy Awards, which was presented by U.S. First Lady Jill Biden, who highlighted Hajipour's message. In 2023, Hajipour was listed as one of Time magazine's 100 Most Influential People in the World.

On 29 August 2023, Pakistani actor Humayun Saeed revealed via his Instagram account that Shervin Hajipour's song "Dornaye Mongharez" would serve as the official OST for the drama series Meray Paas Tum Ho. The series' Persian OST was also produced by Hajipour.

On 1 March 2024, Hajipour was sentenced to serve up to four years in jail, with eight months for creating propaganda against the government and three years for "encouraging and provoking the public to riot to disrupt national security."

On 31 July 2024, Shervin Hajipour published a video on his Instagram social network and announced that his prison sentence has been finalized and he must present himself to prison within the next 3 days. On 23 September, Hajipour announced that he had received a pardon.

== Accolades ==
=== Awards and nominations ===
Award	Year	Recipient(s)	Category	Result	Ref.
Grammy Awards	2023	Baraye	Best Song for Social Change	Won	

=== Honors ===
- Time magazine's list of 100 Most Influential People in the World, April 2023
