= Katsuhiro Oki =

Japanese taekwondo practitioner

Personal information
- Nationality: Japanese
- Born: 25 December 1963 (age 61); Japan

Sport
- Sport: Taekwondo
- Event: Men's featherweight

Katsuhiro Oki (born 25 December 1963) is a Japanese taekwondo practitioner. He competed in the men's featherweight at the 1988 Summer Olympics.
