= Samer Kamal =

Jordanian taekwondo practitioner

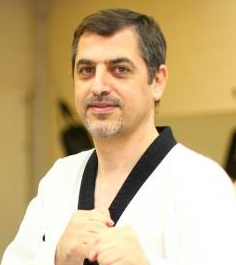

Personal information
- Nationality: Jordanian
- Born: 12 May 1966 (age 60)

Sport
- Sport: Taekwondo
- Event: Men's 1988 Seoul Olympics featherweight Bronze Medalist

Samer Kamal (born 12 May 1966) is a Jordanian taekwondo practitioner, competing in the featherweight category.

In 1986, Kamal won a silver medal in the Seoul 1986 Asian Games. He competed in Seoul again during the 1988 Olympics, winning a bronze medal.

== Acclaims ==
- 9th Dan Black belt (Kukkiwon 2022)
- 9th Dan Black belt (Taekwondo Jidokwan 2022)
- 9th Dan Black belt (Taekwondo Chung Do Kwan 2017)
- 1st Class World Taekwondo International Referee since 1999
- 1st Class Jordanian Instructor since – Amman, Jordan 1987
- World Taekwondo Level 1 Coach – February, 2020. Florida, United States
- World Taekwondo Level 2 Coach – July, 2020
- AI and DC Canada certified Coach – June 2020
- Kukkiwon 3rd Class Master – December 2021. Chicago, United States
- Kukkiwon 2nd Class Master – July 2022. Washington, D.C., United States
- Kukkiwon 1st Class Poom and Black Belt Examiner – July 2022. Washington, D.C., United States

== National Taekwondo Championships ==
- Jordan's Champion and gold medallist for the years: 82, 83, 84, 86, 87, 88, and 89
- Jordan Universities Champion and gold medallist for the years: 83, 84, 85, 86, and 87
- Jordan Military Champion and gold medallist for the years: 88 and 89
- Participated as a player in the following International Championships
- Asian Taekwondo Championships – Singapore 1982
- World Taekwondo Championships – Copenhagen (Denmark) 1983
- Asian Taekwondo Championships – Manila (Philippines) 1984
- Asian Championships – Australia 1986, Bronze
- World Cup Championships – Colorado (United States) 1986
- Asian Games – Seoul (South Korea) 1986, Silver
- World University Championships – (United States) 1986, Silver
- Belgium International Championships 1987, Silver
- Belgium International Championships 1988
- Olympic Games – Seoul (South Korea) 1988, Bronze
- Luxembourg International Championships 1988, Gold
- Belgium International Championships 1989
- World Games – Germany 1989
- World Championships - Seoul (South Korea) 1989

== National Team coaching in international championships ==
- Coach of the Men National Team for the Asian Championships – Manila (Philippines) 1994, Fifth Place
- Coach of the Female Junior National Team for the World Junior Championships – Barcelona (Spain) 1996
- Coach of the Taekwondo Female National Team for the Pan Arab Games – Beirut (Lebanon) 1997, Third Place
- Coach of the Female Junior National Team for the World Junior Championships – Istanbul (Turkey) 1998
- Technical Manager of the Men National Team for the 4th Arab Championships – Cairo (Egypt) 2003, Second Place
- Head of Team for the Men & Female National Team for the 16th Asian Championships – Seoul (South Korea) 2004, Fifth Place

== Awards and recognition ==
Kamal was chosen as the best Jordanian Athlete in 1986 and 1988. He was awarded the Independence Badge of Honor (4th Degree) by King Hussein Ben Talal in 1988. In 1999, Kamal was given the title of Best Jordanian Athlete of the century. In 2018 and 2019, he was the top ranked Kukkiwon (World Taekwondo Headquarters) Master.

== See also ==
- List of taekwondo grandmasters
