= Ali Hajipour (taekwondo) =

Iranian taekwondo practitioner

Medal record

Representing Iran

Men's Taekwando

Asian Games
Silver medal – second place	1986 Seoul	70 kg

Asian Championships
Bronze medal – third place	1986 Darwin	70 kg
Bronze medal – third place	1988 Kathmandu	76 kg

Ali Hajipour (Persian: علی حاجی‌پور) is an Iranian taekwondo athlete who won the silver medal for Iran at the Asian Games 1986.
