= Shooting at the 1970 Asian Games =

- Venue: Sport Authority of Thailand Sport Complex
- Dates: 10–19 December 1970

Shooting sports at the 1970 Asian Games was held in Sport Authority of Thailand Sport Complex Shooting Range, Bangkok, Thailand from 10 December 1970 to 19 December 1970. Shooting comprised seven individual and seven team events for a total of fourteen events, all open to both men and women.

Japan dominated the competition by winning eight gold medals.

== Medalists ==
Event	Gold	Silver	Bronze
25 m center fire pistol	Kim Yong-bae; South Korea	Makoto Shiraishi; Japan	Nguyễn Văn Xuân; South Vietnam
25 m center fire pistol team	Japan; Kanji Kubo; Makoto Shiraishi; Shinji Takahashi; Yoshihisa Yoshikawa	Thailand; Jit Powgangwanwong; Viraj Visessiri; Boriboon Vutiphagdee; Rangsit Yanothai	South Korea; Kim Dal-hyup; Kim Yong-bae; Koh Min-joon; Park Nam-kyu
25 m rapid fire pistol	Kanji Kubo; Japan	Chairat Ratanasupakorn; Thailand	Koh Min-joon; South Korea
25 m rapid fire pistol team	Japan; Takeo Kamachi; Kanji Kubo; Makoto Shiraishi; Tadamasa Yamamoto	Thailand; Solos Nalampoon; Chairat Ratanasupakorn; Viraj Visessiri; Rangsit Yanothai	Burma; Kan U San Yu; Soe Hlaing; Tin Soe
50 m pistol	Isamu Hakari; Japan	Sutham Aswanit; Thailand	Hồ Minh Thu; South Vietnam
50 m pistol team	Japan; Isamu Hakari; Takeo Kamachi; Shinji Takahashi; Yoshihisa Yoshikawa	Thailand; Sutham Aswanit; Samak Chainares; Mongkol Promsit; Boriboon Vutiphagdee	South Korea; Kim Dal-hyup; Kim Yong-bae; Song Woong-ik; Suh Kang-wook
10 m air rifle	Minoru Ito; Japan	Henry Hershkowitz; Israel	Thamnoon Suebsamarn; Thailand
10 m air rifle team	Japan; Minoru Ito; Hiroya Okuda; Kazuya Ono; Kenjiro Tsuba	Thailand; Chawalit Kamutchati; Pipat Rukschareon; Thamnoon Suebsamarn; Surin Sukagasikorn	Burma; Kyaw Shein; Kyaw Lin; Maung Tun; Tun Shein
50 m rifle prone	Takeo Toriyama; Japan	Choo Hwa-il; South Korea	Nehemia Sirkis; Israel
50 m rifle prone team	Israel; Henry Hershkowitz; Micha Kaufman; Zelig Shtorch; Nehemia Sirkis	South Korea; Bae Byung-ki; Choo Hwa-il; Nam Sang-wan; Oh Gul	Japan; Minoru Ito; Hiroya Okuda; Kazuya Ono; Takeo Toriyama
50 m rifle 3 positions	Shin Hyun-joo; South Korea	Wu Tao-yuan; Republic of China	Preeda Phengdisth; Thailand
50 m rifle 3 positions team	South Korea; Bae Byung-ki; Huh Wook-bong; Nam Sang-wan; Shin Hyun-joo	Israel; Shimon Friedman; Henry Hershkowitz; Micha Kaufman; Zelig Shtorch	Japan; Minoru Ito; Hiroya Okuda; Kazuya Ono; Kenjiro Tsuba
50 m standard rifle 3 positions	Shimon Friedman; Israel	Preeda Phengdisth; Thailand	Kazuya Ono; Japan
50 m standard rifle 3 positions team	Thailand; Serm Charuratana; Chawalit Kamutchati; Preeda Phengdisth; Udomsak Theinthong	Israel; Shimon Friedman; Henry Hershkowitz; Micha Kaufman; Zelig Shtorch	South Korea; Bae Byung-ki; Huh Wook-bong; Nam Sang-wan; Oh Gul

== Medal table ==
Rank	Nation	Gold	Silver	Bronze	Total
1	Japan (JPN)	8	1	3	12
2	South Korea (KOR)	3	2	4	9
3	Israel (ISR)	2	3	1	6
4	Thailand (THA)	1	7	2	10
5	Republic of China (ROC)	0	1	0	1
6	Burma (BIR)	0	0	2	2
6	South Vietnam (VNM)	0	0	2	2
Totals (7 entries)		14	14	14	42
