= Israel at the 1970 Asian Games =

Israel's competition at the 1970 Asian Games

- IOC code: ISR
- NOC: Olympic Committee of Israel

in Bangkok
- Medals Ranked 9th: Gold 6 Silver 6 Bronze 5 Total 17

Asian Games appearances (overview)
- 1954; 1958; 1962; 1966; 1970; 1974

Israel participated in the 1970 Asian Games held in Bangkok, Thailand from 9th December to 20th December 1970. The Israeli delegation won 17 medals in total, 6 of which were gold including two apiece by Hana Shezifi and Esther Shahamorov in athletics.

== Medals ==
Games	Gold	Silver	Bronze	Total
Athletics	4	2	1	7
Basketball	0	1	0	1
Shooting	2	3	1	6
Swimming	0	0	3	3
Totals (4 entries)	6	6	5	17

== Athletics ==
=== Medal table ===
Rank	Nation	Gold	Silver	Bronze	Total
1	Israel	4	2	1	7
Totals (1 entries)		4	2	1	7

=== Men ===
Event	Gold		Silver		Bronze	
5000 m	Lucien Rosa; Ceylon	14:32.2	Edward Sequeira; India	14:33.8	Yuval Wischnitzer; Israel	14:34.7

=== Women ===
Event	Gold		Silver		Bronze	
400 m	Kamaljeet Sandhu; India	57.3	Aviva Balas; Israel	57.3	Nobuko Kawano; Japan	57.4
800 m	Hana Shezifi; Israel	2:06.5; GR	Nobuko Kawano; Japan	2:11.7	Isabel Cruz; Philippines	2:13.5
1500 m	Hana Shezifi; Israel	4:25.1; GR	Miyako Inoue; Japan	4:40.2	Lee Chiu-hsia; Republic of China	4:41.4
100 m hurdles	Esther Shahamorov; Israel	14.0; GR	Ayako Natsume; Japan	14.0 =GR	Lin Yueh-hsiang; Republic of China	14.6
Long jump	Hiroko Yamashita; Japan	6.02; GR	Esther Shahamorov; Israel	5.94	Keiko Tsuchida; Japan	5.75
Pentathlon	Esther Shahamorov; Israel	4530; GR	Lin Chun-yu; Republic of China	4382	Lolita Lagrosas; Philippines	4020

== Basketball ==
=== Preliminary round - group A ===
==== Standings ====
Team	Pld	W	L	PF	PA	PD	Pts
Israel	3	3	0	288	181	+107	6
Japan	3	2	1	243	185	+58	5
Singapore	3	1	2	203	284	−81	4
South Vietnam	3	0	3	202	286	−84	3

==== Games ====
10 December

Israel	108–59	South Vietnam

Nimibutr Stadium, Bangkok

11 December

Israel	98–58	Singapore

Nimibutr Stadium, Bangkok

12 December

Israel	82–64	Japan

Nimibutr Stadium, Bangkok

=== Championship ===
==== Standings ====
Team	Pld	W	L	PF	PA	PD	Pts
South Korea	5	4	1	393	320	+73	9
Israel	5	4	1	429	373	+56	9
Japan	5	3	2				8
Taiwan	5	2	3	364	386	−22	7
Philippines	5	2	3	381	378	+3	7
India	5	0	5				5

==== Games ====
14 December

Israel	83–67	Japan

Nimibutr Stadium, Bangkok

15 December

Taiwan	73–114	Israel

Nimibutr Stadium, Bangkok

16 December

Israel	82–74	India

Nimibutr Stadium, Bangkok

18 December

Philippines	78–83	Israel

Nimibutr Stadium, Bangkok

19 December

Israel	67–81	South Korea

Nimibutr Stadium, Bangkok

=== Roster ===
Coach: Shimon Shelah

- Dan Barzily
- Tanhum Cohen-Mintz
- Hillel Gilboa
- Ronald Green
- Hanan Keren
- Ivan Leshinsky
- Itamar Marzel
- Gabi Neumark
- Mike Schwarz
- Haim Starkman
- Gabi Teichner
- Mark Turenshine

== Shooting ==
=== Medal table ===
Rank	Nation	Gold	Silver	Bronze	Total
1	Israel	2	3	1	6
Totals (1 entries)		2	3	1	6

=== Results ===
Event	Gold	Silver	Bronze
10 m air rifle	Minoru Ito; Japan	Henry Hershkowitz; Israel	Thamnoon Suebsamarn; Thailand
50 m rifle prone	Takeo Toriyama; Japan	Chu Hwa-il; South Korea	Nehemia Sirkis; Israel
50 m rifle prone team	Israel; Henry Hershkowitz; Micha Kaufman; Zelig Shtroch; Nehemia Sirkis	South Korea; Bae Byung-ki; Chu Hwa-il; Nam Sang-wan; Oh Gul	Japan; Minoru Ito; Hiroya Okuda; Kazuya Ono; Takeo Toriyama
50 m rifle 3 positions team	South Korea; Bae Byung-ki; Huh Wook-bong; Nam Sang-wan; Shin Hyun-joo	Israel; Shimon Friedman; Henry Hershkowitz; Micha Kaufman; Zelig Shtroch	Japan; Minoru Ito; Hiroya Okuda; Kazuya Ono; Kenjiro Tsuba
50 m standard rifle 3 positions	Shimon Friedman; Israel	Preeda Phengdisth; Thailand	Kazuya Ono; Japan
50 m standard rifle 3 positions team	Thailand; Serm Charuratana; Chawalit Kamutchati; Preeda Phengdisth; Udomsak Theinthong	Israel; Shimon Friedman; Henry Hershkowitz; Micha Kaufman; Zelig Shtroch	South Korea; Bae Byung-ki; Huh Wook-bong; Nam Sang-wan; Oh Gul

== Swimming ==
=== Medal table ===
Rank	Nation	Gold	Silver	Bronze	Total
1	Israel	0	0	3	3
Totals (1 entries)		0	0	3	3

=== Men ===
Event	Gold		Silver		Bronze	
4 × 100 m medley relay	Japan; Tadashi Honda; Nobutaka Taguchi; Satoshi Maruya; Shojiro Sawa	4:00.4; GR	Philippines; Ibnorajik Muksan; Amman Jalmaani; Leroy Goff; Jairulla Jaitulla	4:15.3	Israel; Yoav Yaakovi; Yoel Kenda; Dan Stern; Moshe Gertel	4:18.1

=== Women ===
Event	Gold		Silver		Bronze	
100 m breaststroke	Hitomi Tanigami; Japan	1:18.9; GR	Chieno Shibata; Japan	1:19.8	Shlomit Nir; Israel	1:20.6
200 m breaststroke	Chieno Shibata; Japan	2:46.5; GR	Hitomi Tanigami; Japan	2:51.5	Shlomit Nir; Israel	2:54.3
