= Shooting at the 1976 Summer Olympics – Mixed 50 metre rifle prone =

Shooting sports event in the 1976 Summer Olympics

Mixed 50 metre rifle, prone at the Games of the XXI Olympiad
- Venue: Montreal, Canada
- Date: 19 July 1976
- Competitors: 78 from 45 nations

Medalists
1st place, gold medalist(s)		Karlheinz Smieszek	West Germany
2nd place, silver medalist(s)		Ulrich Lind	West Germany
3rd place, bronze medalist(s)		Gennadi Lushchikov	Soviet Union

The mixed 50 metre rifle, prone was a shooting sports event held as part of the Shooting at the 1976 Summer Olympics programme. It was the thirteenth appearance of the event. The competition was held on 19 July 1976 at the shooting ranges in Montreal. 78 shooters from 45 nations competed.

== Results ==
Place	Shooter	Total
1	Karlheinz Smieszek (FRG)	599
2	Ulrich Lind (FRG)	597
3	Gennadi Lushchikov (URS)	595
4	Anton Müller (SUI)	595
5	Walter Frescura (ITA)	594
6	Arne Sorensen (CAN)	593
7	Henning Clausen (DEN)	593
8	Desanka Pešut (YUG)	592
9	Durval Guimarães (BRA)	592
10	Olegario Vázquez (MEX)	592
11	Mendbayaryn Jantsankhorloo (MGL)	592
12T	Micha Kaufman (ISR)	591
12T	Stefan Krastev (BUL)	591
12T	Gerhard Krimbacher (AUT)	591
12T	Terje Melbye Hansen (NOR)	591
12T	Boris Melnik (URS)	591
12T	Ralph Rodríguez (PUR)	591
12T	Miguel Valdes (CUB)	591
12T	Jiří Vogler (TCH)	591
20T	Ian Ballinger (NZL)	590
20T	Karel Bulan (TCH)	590
20T	Anthony Greenfield (GBR)	590
20T	Odette Meuter (BEL)	590
20T	Lajos Papp (HUN)	590
20T	Jacques Pichon (FRA)	590
20T	David Ross (USA)	590
20T	Wolfram Waibel, Sr. (AUT)	590
28T	Hans Adlhoch (CAN)	589
28T	Andrzej Trajda (POL)	589
28T	Gheorghe Vasilescu (ROU)	589
31T	Helge Anshushaug (NOR)	588
31T	Victor Auer (USA)	588
31T	Saijo Hosokawa (JPN)	588
31T	Sven Johansson (SWE)	588
31T	Frans Lafortune (BEL)	588
31T	Miroslav Šipek (YUG)	588
37T	László Hammerl (HUN)	587
37T	Gilbert Emptaz (FRA)	587
37T	Peter Gorewski (GDR)	587
37T	Stanisław Marucha (POL)	587
41T	Donald Brook (AUS)	586
41T	Luis del Cerro (ESP)	586
41T	Jouko Hietalahti (FIN)	586
41T	Wongsak Malaipun (THA)	586
41T	Lambis Manthos (GRE)	586
41T	Peter Rull, Sr. (HKG)	586
47T	Mehmet Dursun (TUR)	585
47T	Manuel Hawayek (PUR)	585
47T	Ioannis Skarafingas (GRE)	585
47T	Stefan Thynell (SWE)	585
51T	Sangidorjiin Adilbish (MGL)	584
51T	Alister Allan (GBR)	584
51T	José González (CUB)	584
51T	Don Gowland (AUS)	584
51T	Marlies Kanthak (GDR)	584
51T	José María Pigrau (ESP)	584
57T	Choi Chung-seok (KOR)	583
57T	Jaakko Minkkinen (FIN)	583
57T	Ricardo Rusticucci (ARG)	583
60T	Joe Barral (MON)	582
60T	Waldemar Capucci (BRA)	582
60T	Giuseppe De Chirico (ITA)	582
60T	Anka Pelova (BUL)	582
64T	Pierre Boisson (MON)	581
64T	Willy Hillen (NED)	581
64T	Kim Gyong-Ho (PRK)	581
64T	Lee Gyun (KOR)	581
68T	Hugo Chamberlain (CRC)	580
68T	Kaoru Matsuo (JPN)	580
68T	Nicolae Rotaru (ROU)	580
71	Reginald Dos Remedios (HKG)	579
72	Hasse Persson (DEN)	578
73	Suthorn Parmkerd (THA)	574
74T	Harold Frederick (ISV)	571
74T	Peter Hogan (ISV)	571
76	Alfredo Pelliccioni (SMR)	565
77	John Fong Yew (TTO)	564
78	Owen Phillips (BIZ)	544
