= Shooting at the 1976 Summer Olympics – Mixed 50 metre rifle three positions =

Sports shooting at the Olympics

Mixed 50 metre rifle three positions at the Games of the XXI Olympiad
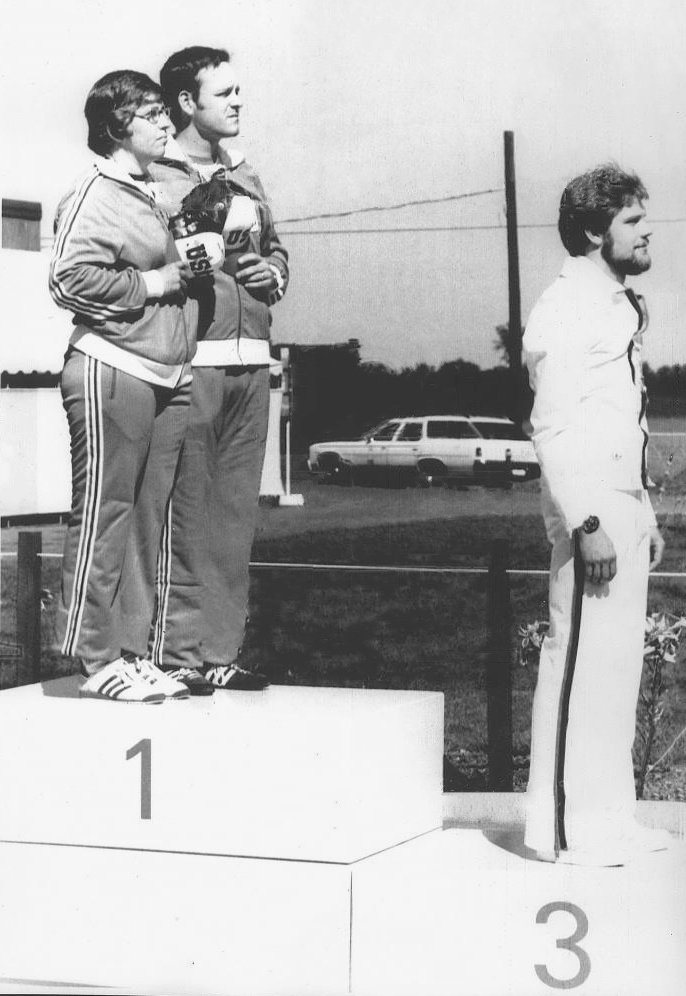
- Left-right:Murdock, Bassham and Seibold
- Venue: Montreal, Canada
- Date: 21 July 1976
- Competitors: 57 from 34 nations

Medalists
1st place, gold medalist(s)		Lanny Bassham	United States
2nd place, silver medalist(s)		Margaret Murdock	United States
3rd place, bronze medalist(s)		Werner Seibold	West Germany

The Mixed 50 metre rifle three positions event was a shooting sports event held as part of the Shooting at the 1976 Summer Olympics programme. It was the seventh appearance of the event. The competition was held on 21 July 1976 at the shooting ranges in Montreal. 57 shooters from 34 nations competed.

Lanny Bassham and Margaret Murdock tied for the first place, but Murdock was placed second after review of the targets. Bassham suggested that two gold medals be given, and after this request was declined, asked Murdock to share the top step with him at the award ceremony. Women had no separate shooting events at the time and were allowed to compete with men. Murdock became the first woman to win an Olympic medal in shooting.

== Results ==
Place	Shooter	Total
1	Lanny Bassham (USA)	1162
2	Margaret Murdock (USA)	1162
3	Werner Seibold (FRG)	1160
4	Srecko Pejovic (YUG)	1156
5	Sven Johansson (SWE)	1152
6	Ri Ho-jun (PRK)	1152
7	Zdravko Milutinović (YUG)	1152
8	Aleksandr Mitrofanov (URS)	1151
9	Bernd Hartstein (GDR)	1150
10	Gottfried Kustermann (FRG)	1150
11T	Gennadi Lushchikov (URS)	1148
11T	Nonka Matova (BUL)	1148
13	Lajos Papp (HUN)	1145
14T	Hans Adlhoch (CAN)	1144
14T	Eugeniusz Pędzisz (POL)	1144
16	Kurt Mitchell (CAN)	1143
17	Nicolae Rotaru (ROU)	1141
18T	Malcolm Cooper (GBR)	1140
18T	Stefan Thynell (SWE)	1140
20T	Henning Clausen (DEN)	1139
20T	Petr Kovářík (TCH)	1139
20T	Emiliyan Vergov (BUL)	1139
23	Miguel Valdes (CUB)	1138
24T	Barry Dagger (GBR)	1137
24T	Jaakko Minkkinen (FIN)	1137
24T	Romuald Siemionow (POL)	1137
27	Antonín Schwarz (TCH)	1136
28	Helge Anshushaug (NOR)	1135
29	Terje Melbye Hansen (NOR)	1135
30	Piero Errani (ITA)	1134
31	Gilbert Emptaz (FRA)	1131
32T	Charles Jermann (SUI)	1130
32T	Marlies Kanthak (GDR)	1130
32T	Olegario Vázquez (MEX)	1130
35T	Ștefan Kaban (ROU)	1129
35T	Bo Lilja (DEN)	1129
35T	Sándor Nagy (HUN)	1129
38	Max Hürzeler (SUI)	1128
39	Kim Gyong-ho (PRK)	1127
40	Wolfram Waibel, Sr. (AUT)	1123
41	Kaoru Matsuo (JPN)	1119
42	Gerhard Krimbacher (AUT)	1117
43	Jouko Hietalahti (FIN)	1116
44	Michiharu Ozaki (JPN)	1115
45	José del Villar (ESP)	1114
46	Frans Lafortune (BEL)	1113
47	Ralph Rodríguez (PUR)	1111
48T	Yves Delnord (FRA)	1110
48T	Somporn Onzhim (THA)	1110
50	Donald Brook (AUS)	1109
51T	Jorge di Giandoménico (ARG)	1106
51T	Micha Kaufman (ISR)	1106
51T	Padet Vejsavarn (THA)	1106
54	Hugo Chamberlain (CRC)	1086
55	Reinaldo Ramírez (PAR)	1015
56	Italo Casali (SMR)	1009
57	Pasquale Raschi (SMR)	1001
