= Shooting at the 1972 Summer Olympics – Mixed 50 metre rifle prone =

50 metre rifle prone at the Games of the XX Olympiad
- Venue: Schießanlage
- Date: August 28, 1972
- Competitors: 101 from 58 nations
- Winning score: 599 WR

Medalists
1st place, gold medalist(s)		Ri Ho-jun	North Korea
2nd place, silver medalist(s)		Victor Auer	United States
3rd place, bronze medalist(s)		Nicolae Rotaru	Romania

The following are the results of the 50 metre rifle prone competition at the 1972 Summer Olympics. The gold medal was won by Ri Ho-jun of North Korea, this was the first ever medal for a North Korean athlete at the Summer Olympics. It appeared that Vic Auer from the United States won the gold with 598. After a controversial "review" the official scores were announced and the judges gave Li 599 for the gold medal.

== Final ==
The format was: 50 metres prone. 60 shots in prone position. For a possible score of 600. All ties are broken by the best score in the sixth stage, if still tied it goes to the fifth stage and continues until the tie is broken.

Rank	Name	Nationality	1	2	3	4	5	6	Total
1st place, gold medalist(s)	Ri Ho-jun	North Korea	99	100	100	100	100	100	599 WR
2nd place, silver medalist(s)	Victor Auer	United States	100	98	100	100	100	100	598
3rd place, bronze medalist(s)	Nicolae Rotaru	Romania	100	100	100	99	100	99	598
4	Giuseppe De Chirico	Italy	99	100	99	99	100	100	597
5	Jiří Vogler	Czechoslovakia	100	100	98	99	100	100	597
6	Jaime Santiago	Puerto Rico	100	100	99	99	99	100	597
7	Lones Wigger	United States	99	99	100	100	100	99	597
8	László Hammerl	Hungary	100	99	100	100	99	99	597
9	Andrzej Trajda	Poland	100	100	100	100	98	99	597
10	Donald Brook	Australia	99	99	99	100	99	100	596
11	Rudolf Pojer	Czechoslovakia	100	100	99	98	100	99	596
12	Werner Lippoldt	East Germany	100	99	100	99	99	99	596
13	Wolfram Waibel, Sr.	Austria	100	100	100	98	100	98	596
14	Frans Lafortune	Belgium	99	98	100	99	100	99	595
15	Henning Clausen	Denmark	99	99	100	99	99	99	595
16	Silvester Knipfer	West Germany	99	100	98	100	100	98	595
17	Willy Hillen	Netherlands	99	100	99	99	100	98	595
18	Vitaly Parkhimovich	Soviet Union	99	98	99	99	99	100	594
19	Emiliyan Vergov	Bulgaria	98	100	100	97	99	100	594
20	Ernesto Montemayor, Jr.	Mexico	100	98	99	99	98	100	594
21	Stefan Vasilev	Bulgaria	99	98	99	100	99	99	594
22	Ismail Rama	Albania	99	99	99	100	98	99	594
23	Henry Herscovici	Israel	100	99	97	98	100	99	593
24	Peter Gorewski	East Germany	98	99	99	99	99	99	593
25	Russell Dove	Australia	98	100	98	99	99	99	593
26	Ioannis Skarafingas	Greece	98	99	100	98	99	99	593
27	Lambis Manthos	Greece	96	99	100	100	100	98	593
28	Eulalia Rolińska	Poland	99	97	100	99	100	98	593
29	Mike Watt	New Zealand	99	98	100	100	99	97	593
30	Zdravko Milutinović	Yugoslavia	100	98	99	100	99	97	593
31	Joe Barral	Monaco	99	100	99	99	99	97	593
32	Olegario Vázquez	Mexico	98	100	97	98	99	100	592
33	Manuel Hawayek	Puerto Rico	98	99	98	99	98	100	592
34	Valentin Kornev	Soviet Union	97	99	99	98	100	99	592
35	Mehmet Dursun	Turkey	100	97	98	98	100	99	592
36	Christer Jansson	Sweden	97	99	99	99	99	99	592
37	Gottfried Kustermann	West Germany	99	99	98	99	98	99	592
38	Ricardo Rusticucci	Argentina	99	100	97	100	97	99	592
39	Sven Johansson	Sweden	99	100	98	99	97	99	592
40	Helge Anshushaug	Norway	100	99	99	98	99	97	592
41	Wu Tao-yan	Republic of China	98	98	99	97	99	100	591
42	Mendbayaryn Jantsankhorloo	Mongolia	97	98	99	99	99	99	591
43	Walter Frescura	Italy	98	98	98	99	99	99	591
44	Humberto Cabrera	Cuba	97	99	99	99	98	99	591
45	Michel Fontaine	France	98	100	99	98	98	98	591
46	Ian Ballinger	New Zealand	98	100	100	100	97	96	591
47	Alf Mayer	Canada	97	98	97	98	100	100	590
48	Sándor Nagy	Hungary	98	99	98	98	97	100	590
49	Luis del Cerro	Spain	97	98	99	100	96	100	590
50	Gil Boa	Canada	95	98	99	100	99	99	590
51	Adelso Peña	Cuba	98	99	98	98	99	98	590
52	Robert Houman	Belgium	99	99	98	97	99	98	590
53	Ilie Codreanu	Romania	99	99	96	100	98	98	590
54	John Palin	Great Britain	98	98	97	100	100	97	590
55	Phil Lawrence	Great Britain	97	98	99	99	100	97	590
56	Dismus Onyiego	Kenya	100	99	96	99	100	96	590
57	Zelig Shtroch	Israel	96	98	97	100	99	99	589
58	Li Yun-hae	North Korea	98	98	95	100	99	99	589
59	Minoru Ito	Japan	97	96	100	99	98	99	589
60	Choi Chung-seok	South Korea	99	98	98	96	100	98	589
61	Jaakko Asikainen	Finland	98	98	99	98	98	98	589
62	Erwin Vogt	Switzerland	98	99	99	96	98	98	588
63	Theo Ditzler	Switzerland	98	95	97	98	100	99	587
64	José Luis Calvo	Spain	100	96	97	99	97	98	587
65	Daya Rajasinghe Nadarajasingham	Ceylon	97	99	98	98	98	97	587
66	Beqir Kosova	Albania	100	96	98	98	99	96	587
67	Karl Fröschl	Austria	100	97	97	99	99	95	587
68	Hugo Chamberlain	Costa Rica	97	96	97	98	99	99	586
69	Jens Nygård	Norway	99	98	97	100	94	98	589
70	Udomsak Theinthong	Thailand	96	98	98	99	98	97	586
71	Alfonso Rodríguez	Colombia	96	98	97	99	97	98	585
72	Chira Prabandhayodhin	Thailand	98	97	99	96	98	97	585
73	Pierre Boisson	Monaco	96	98	99	99	97	96	585
74	Milton Tucker	Barbados	97	98	96	96	99	98	584
75	Gladys Baldwin	Peru	95	99	98	96	98	98	584
76	Vagn Andersen	Denmark	97	98	96	97	99	97	584
77	Agustin Rangel	Venezuela	98	95	95	100	97	98	583
78	Douglas Mast	Virgin Islands	98	97	97	96	97	98	583
79	Simon Ekeno	Kenya	96	95	100	98	96	98	583
80	Esa Kervinen	Finland	97	95	98	98	98	97	583
81	Remo Sele	Liechtenstein	95	96	98	98	100	96	583
82	Takeshi Sugita	Japan	99	98	96	98	97	95	583
83	Peter Rull, Sr.	Hong Kong	97	95	98	99	96	97	582
84	André Noël	France	94	98	97	100	93	99	581
85	Wong Foo Wah	Malaysia	98	98	98	95	96	96	581
86	Fernando Inchauste	Bolivia	97	97	98	94	96	98	580
87	Louis Frommelt	Liechtenstein	99	99	95	96	95	96	580
88	Harold Frederick	Virgin Islands	98	95	99	97	97	94	580
89	Jaime Callejas	Colombia	97	94	97	100	95	96	579
90	César Batista	Portugal	98	96	94	97	94	99	578
91	Juan Antonio Valencia	El Salvador	97	93	97	97	97	95	576
92	Mário Ribeiro	Portugal	96	95	96	94	96	98	575
93	Cavour Morris	Barbados	97	95	95	97	94	97	575
94	Eduardo Arroyo	Bolivia	96	99	94	97	93	96	575
95	Prithipal Chatterjee	India	97	96	96	93	95	95	572
96	Yondonjamtsyn Batsükh	Mongolia	98	96	94	95	96	93	572
97	Lodovico Espinosa	Philippines	92	94	96	98	96	94	570
98	José Mario Váldez	El Salvador	94	94	96	96	93	96	569
99	Roy Choudhury	India	93	95	97	96	92	94	567
100	Bèto Adriana	Netherlands Antilles	93	93	96	93	96	95	566
101	Owen Phillips	British Honduras	87	94	94	94	95	91	555
—	Italo Casali	San Marino							DNS
—	Libero Casali	San Marino							DNS
