= Shooting at the 1972 Summer Olympics – Mixed 50 metre rifle three positions =

Shooting at the 1972 Summer Olympics – 50 meter rifle three positions at the Games of the XX Olympiad
- Venue: Schießanlage
- Date: August 30, 1972
- Competitors: 69 from 40 nations
- Winning score: 1166 WR

Medalists
1st place, gold medalist(s)		John Writer	United States
2nd place, silver medalist(s)		Lanny Bassham	United States
3rd place, bronze medalist(s)		Werner Lippoldt	East Germany

These are the results of the 50 metre rifle three positions at the 1972 Summer Olympics. The gold medal went to John Writer of the United States, who was the silver medalist in 1968. He went on and broke the world record with a score of 1166 points. The silver medalist was also from the United States, Lanny Bassham, who got off to a poor start, but recovered well enough to claim silver. Bassham returned 4 years later to claim gold in the same event.

== Final ==
Format: 50 metres; 120 shots. 40 shots prone, 40 shots kneeling and 40 shots standing. 400 possible at each distance, 1200 total points available. All ties were broken by the best score on the final string of kneeling, if still tied the best score on the final string of standing, followed by prone.

Rank	Name	Nationality	Position	Series				Total	Score
Rank	Name	Nationality	Position	1	2	3	4	Total	Score
1st place, gold medalist(s)	John Writer	United States	Prone	97	99	99	100	395	1166 WR
1st place, gold medalist(s)	John Writer	United States	Standing	95	98	94	94	381	1166 WR
1st place, gold medalist(s)	John Writer	United States	Kneeling	98	96	99	97	390	1166 WR
2nd place, silver medalist(s)	Lanny Bassham	United States	Prone	97	97	99	97	390	1157
2nd place, silver medalist(s)	Lanny Bassham	United States	Standing	92	95	95	93	375	1157
2nd place, silver medalist(s)	Lanny Bassham	United States	Kneeling	97	100	97	98	392	1157
3rd place, bronze medalist(s)	Werner Lippoldt	East Germany	Prone	98	98	99	98	393	1153
3rd place, bronze medalist(s)	Werner Lippoldt	East Germany	Standing	93	97	90	92	372	1153
3rd place, bronze medalist(s)	Werner Lippoldt	East Germany	Kneeling	98	95	96	99	388	1153
4	Petr Kovářík	Czechoslovakia	Prone	99	99	100	99	397	1153
4	Petr Kovářík	Czechoslovakia	Standing	89	93	90	96	368	1153
4	Petr Kovářík	Czechoslovakia	Kneeling	96	96	98	98	388	1153
5	Vladimir Agishev	Soviet Union	Prone	98	99	97	98	392	1152
5	Vladimir Agishev	Soviet Union	Standing	90	96	92	91	369	1152
5	Vladimir Agishev	Soviet Union	Kneeling	99	97	99	96	391	1152
6	Andrzej Sieledcow	Poland	Prone	98	100	98	99	395	1151
6	Andrzej Sieledcow	Poland	Standing	96	91	91	91	369	1151
6	Andrzej Sieledcow	Poland	Kneeling	99	95	96	97	387	1151
7	Gottfried Kustermann	West Germany	Prone	99	99	100	99	397	1149
7	Gottfried Kustermann	West Germany	Standing	92	89	93	90	364	1149
7	Gottfried Kustermann	West Germany	Kneeling	96	95	98	9	388	1149
8	Nicolae Rotaru	Romania	Prone	99	100	99	99	397	1148
8	Nicolae Rotaru	Romania	Standing	90	88	89	94	361	1148
8	Nicolae Rotaru	Romania	Kneeling	97	98	99	96	390	1148
9	Ri Ho-jun	North Korea	Prone	98	99	100	99	396	1147
9	Ri Ho-jun	North Korea	Standing	92	91	91	93	367	1147
9	Ri Ho-jun	North Korea	Kneeling	98	94	99	93	384	1147
10	Zdravko Milutinović	Yugoslavia	Prone	98	98	100	100	396	1144
10	Zdravko Milutinović	Yugoslavia	Standing	92	92	91	91	366	1144
10	Zdravko Milutinović	Yugoslavia	Kneeling	98	90	97	97	382	1144
11	Vitaly Parkhimovich	Soviet Union	Prone	97	99	100	100	396	1144
11	Vitaly Parkhimovich	Soviet Union	Standing	88	94	92	90	364	1144
11	Vitaly Parkhimovich	Soviet Union	Kneeling	94	98	96	96	384	1144
12	Karel Bulan	Czechoslovakia	Prone	97	100	100	98	395	1144
12	Karel Bulan	Czechoslovakia	Standing	91	92	92	92	367	1144
12	Karel Bulan	Czechoslovakia	Kneeling	95	97	94	96	382	1144
13	Emiliyan Vergov	Bulgaria	Prone	99	100	96	98	393	1143
13	Emiliyan Vergov	Bulgaria	Standing	93	87	91	91	362	1143
13	Emiliyan Vergov	Bulgaria	Kneeling	96	97	98	97	388	1143
14	Uto Wunderlich	East Germany	Prone	97	96	98	100	391	1142
14	Uto Wunderlich	East Germany	Standing	90	95	94	95	374	1142
14	Uto Wunderlich	East Germany	Kneeling	95	95	96	91	377	1142
15	Erwin Vogt	Switzerland	Prone	99	100	100	99	398	1141
15	Erwin Vogt	Switzerland	Standing	91	90	90	89	360	1141
15	Erwin Vogt	Switzerland	Kneeling	96	97	94	96	383	1141
16	Bernd Klingner	West Germany	Prone	99	98	100	98	395	1141
16	Bernd Klingner	West Germany	Standing	90	91	83	95	359	1141
16	Bernd Klingner	West Germany	Kneeling	98	96	98	95	387	1141
17	László Hammerl	Hungary	Prone	96	99	100	100	395	1141
17	László Hammerl	Hungary	Standing	93	89	93	92	367	1141
17	László Hammerl	Hungary	Kneeling	96	92	97	94	379	1141
18	Malcolm Cooper	Great Britain	Prone	100	98	99	97	394	1141
18	Malcolm Cooper	Great Britain	Standing	93	89	93	89	364	1141
18	Malcolm Cooper	Great Britain	Kneeling	96	98	97	92	383	1141
19	Miguel Valdes	Cuba	Prone	99	98	99	97	393	1139
19	Miguel Valdes	Cuba	Standing	89	85	92	93	359	1139
19	Miguel Valdes	Cuba	Kneeling	96	99	97	95	387	1139
20	Petre Șandor	Romania	Prone	96	95	97	99	387	1139
20	Petre Șandor	Romania	Standing	96	94	89	90	369	1139
20	Petre Șandor	Romania	Kneeling	95	96	99	93	383	1139
21	Giuseppe De Chirico	Italy	Prone	99	97	100	99	395	1138
21	Giuseppe De Chirico	Italy	Standing	89	89	91	93	362	1138
21	Giuseppe De Chirico	Italy	Kneeling	94	95	95	97	381	1138
22	Christer Jansson	Sweden	Prone	98	99	98	100	395	1138
22	Christer Jansson	Sweden	Standing	91	91	91	92	365	1138
22	Christer Jansson	Sweden	Kneeling	91	95	95	97	378	1138
23	Sándor Nagy	Hungary	Prone	96	100	100	100	396	1138
23	Sándor Nagy	Hungary	Standing	88	91	91	90	360	1138
23	Sándor Nagy	Hungary	Kneeling	92	96	98	96	382	1138
24	Gilbert Emptaz	France	Prone	98	99	100	98	395	1138
24	Gilbert Emptaz	France	Standing	91	93	87	91	362	1138
24	Gilbert Emptaz	France	Kneeling	96	94	95	96	381	1138
25	Wolfram Waibel, Sr.	Austria	Prone	98	98	96	100	392	1137
25	Wolfram Waibel, Sr.	Austria	Standing	90	93	91	90	364	1137
25	Wolfram Waibel, Sr.	Austria	Kneeling	96	98	96	91	381	1137
26	Sven Johansson	Sweden	Prone	99	99	99	98	395	1136
26	Sven Johansson	Sweden	Standing	91	87	90	89	357	1136
26	Sven Johansson	Sweden	Kneeling	95	97	96	96	384	1136
27	Li Yun-hae	North Korea	Prone	99	100	100	98	397	1134
27	Li Yun-hae	North Korea	Standing	86	91	87	88	352	1134
27	Li Yun-hae	North Korea	Kneeling	94	98	94	99	385	1134
28	Raúl Llanos	Cuba	Prone	99	99	98	97	393	1134
28	Raúl Llanos	Cuba	Standing	89	91	91	88	359	1134
28	Raúl Llanos	Cuba	Kneeling	95	95	96	96	382	1134
29	Esa Kervinen	Finland	Prone	98	100	99	98	395	1134
29	Esa Kervinen	Finland	Standing	90	90	85	93	358	1134
29	Esa Kervinen	Finland	Kneeling	96	96	94	95	381	1134
30	Henning Clausen	Denmark	Prone	99	98	99	98	394	1133
30	Henning Clausen	Denmark	Standing	92	93	85	90	360	1133
30	Henning Clausen	Denmark	Kneeling	97	96	89	97	379	1133
31	Bob Churchill	Great Britain	Prone	97	99	100	100	396	1132
31	Bob Churchill	Great Britain	Standing	91	90	90	87	358	1132
31	Bob Churchill	Great Britain	Kneeling	95	92	96	95	378	1132
32	Jaakko Minkkinen	Finland	Prone	98	98	98	98	392	1132
32	Jaakko Minkkinen	Finland	Standing	89	93	85	94	361	1132
32	Jaakko Minkkinen	Finland	Kneeling	95	96	96	92	379	1132
33	Per Weichel	Denmark	Prone	97	97	98	99	391	1130
33	Per Weichel	Denmark	Standing	84	94	87	93	358	1130
33	Per Weichel	Denmark	Kneeling	92	96	96	97	381	1130
34	Stefan Vasilev	Bulgaria	Prone	100	99	99	99	397	1130
34	Stefan Vasilev	Bulgaria	Standing	84	93	87	90	354	1130
34	Stefan Vasilev	Bulgaria	Kneeling	94	93	97	95	379	1130
35	Bjørn Bakken	Norway	Prone	100	98	96	96	390	1129
35	Bjørn Bakken	Norway	Standing	91	91	92	90	364	1129
35	Bjørn Bakken	Norway	Kneeling	96	91	93	95	375	1129
36	Eugeniusz Pędzisz	Poland	Prone	99	98	97	99	393	1128
36	Eugeniusz Pędzisz	Poland	Standing	86	88	90	90	354	1128
36	Eugeniusz Pędzisz	Poland	Kneeling	98	93	94	96	381	1128
37	Piero Errani	Italy	Prone	98	99	99	96	392	1128
37	Piero Errani	Italy	Standing	94	87	92	88	361	1128
37	Piero Errani	Italy	Kneeling	93	96	95	91	375	1128
38	Patrice de Mullenheim	France	Prone	98	98	98	99	393	1126
38	Patrice de Mullenheim	France	Standing	81	89	93	86	349	1126
38	Patrice de Mullenheim	France	Kneeling	93	97	98	96	384	1126
39	Guido Loacker	Austria	Prone	98	99	99	100	396	1126
39	Guido Loacker	Austria	Standing	85	92	88	90	355	1126
39	Guido Loacker	Austria	Kneeling	92	96	91	96	375	1126
40	Mendbayaryn Jantsankhorloo	Mongolia	Prone	100	99	100	98	397	1125
40	Mendbayaryn Jantsankhorloo	Mongolia	Standing	84	89	88	89	350	1125
40	Mendbayaryn Jantsankhorloo	Mongolia	Kneeling	95	92	94	97	378	1125
41	Minoru Ito	Japan	Prone	99	99	96	96	390	1124
41	Minoru Ito	Japan	Standing	88	91	89	86	354	1124
41	Minoru Ito	Japan	Kneeling	94	90	97	99	380	1124
42	Alf Mayer	Canada	Prone	99	99	99	97	394	1123
42	Alf Mayer	Canada	Standing	89	86	89	83	347	1123
42	Alf Mayer	Canada	Kneeling	99	97	93	93	382	1123
43	Olegario Vázquez	Mexico	Prone	96	100	99	97	392	1122
43	Olegario Vázquez	Mexico	Standing	91	92	90	81	354	1122
43	Olegario Vázquez	Mexico	Kneeling	92	97	96	91	376	1122
44	Helge Anshushaug	Norway	Prone	98	100	100	100	398	1121
44	Helge Anshushaug	Norway	Standing	84	85	94	85	348	1121
44	Helge Anshushaug	Norway	Kneeling	92	94	98	91	375	1121
45	Martin Truttmann	Switzerland	Prone	98	95	98	100	391	1117
45	Martin Truttmann	Switzerland	Standing	89	88	90	92	359	1117
45	Martin Truttmann	Switzerland	Kneeling	89	92	94	92	367	1117
46	Henry Herscovici	Israel	Prone	97	97	100	100	394	1114
46	Henry Herscovici	Israel	Standing	90	82	86	87	345	1114
46	Henry Herscovici	Israel	Kneeling	95	94	92	94	375	1114
47	Frans Lafortune	Belgium	Prone	99	97	99	99	394	1107
47	Frans Lafortune	Belgium	Standing	86	88	85	86	345	1107
47	Frans Lafortune	Belgium	Kneeling	94	89	92	93	368	1107
48	Jaime Callejas	Colombia	Prone	97	98	93	99	387	1106
48	Jaime Callejas	Colombia	Standing	83	89	87	87	346	1106
48	Jaime Callejas	Colombia	Kneeling	94	90	97	92	373	1106
49	Arne Sorensen	Canada	Prone	95	100	98	98	391	1105
49	Arne Sorensen	Canada	Standing	84	87	83	88	342	1105
49	Arne Sorensen	Canada	Kneeling	94	92	93	93	372	1105
50	Jesús Elizondo	Mexico	Prone	97	100	96	97	390	1105
50	Jesús Elizondo	Mexico	Standing	87	82	88	84	341	1105
50	Jesús Elizondo	Mexico	Kneeling	95	93	94	92	374	1105
51	Wu Tao-yan	Republic of China	Prone	96	99	98	97	390	1101
51	Wu Tao-yan	Republic of China	Standing	86	91	80	86	343	1101
51	Wu Tao-yan	Republic of China	Kneeling	91	94	90	93	368	1101
52	Jorge di Giandoménico	Argentina	Prone	97	96	97	96	386	1098
52	Jorge di Giandoménico	Argentina	Standing	88	85	90	87	350	1098
52	Jorge di Giandoménico	Argentina	Kneeling	93	88	91	90	362	1098
53	Chawalit Kamutchati	Thailand	Prone	99	97	96	96	388	1090
53	Chawalit Kamutchati	Thailand	Standing	87	88	80	83	338	1090
53	Chawalit Kamutchati	Thailand	Kneeling	85	91	94	94	364	1090
54	Yondonjamtsyn Batsükh	Mongolia	Prone	100	97	96	97	390	1088
54	Yondonjamtsyn Batsükh	Mongolia	Standing	84	80	86	81	331	1088
54	Yondonjamtsyn Batsükh	Mongolia	Kneeling	93	91	90	93	367	1088
55	Alfonso Rodríguez	Colombia	Prone	94	98	98	98	388	1087
55	Alfonso Rodríguez	Colombia	Standing	78	87	87	90	342	1087
55	Alfonso Rodríguez	Colombia	Kneeling	85	89	89	84	357	1087
56	Hugo Chamberlain	Costa Rica	Prone	98	98	96	96	388	1086
56	Hugo Chamberlain	Costa Rica	Standing	87	86	82	82	337	1086
56	Hugo Chamberlain	Costa Rica	Kneeling	91	92	90	88	361	1086
57	Preeda Phengdisth	Thailand	Prone	97	96	98	96	387	1079
57	Preeda Phengdisth	Thailand	Standing	80	78	83	88	329	1079
57	Preeda Phengdisth	Thailand	Kneeling	90	93	86	94	363	1079
58	Mehmet Dursun	Turkey	Prone	96	98	97	97	388	1078
58	Mehmet Dursun	Turkey	Standing	83	85	79	86	333	1078
58	Mehmet Dursun	Turkey	Kneeling	91	90	88	88	357	1078
59	Lodovico Espinosa	Philippines	Prone	97	99	97	97	390	1072
59	Lodovico Espinosa	Philippines	Standing	82	76	81	81	320	1072
59	Lodovico Espinosa	Philippines	Kneeling	96	90	89	87	362	1072
60	Dismus Onyiego	Kenya	Prone	98	96	94	98	386	1063
60	Dismus Onyiego	Kenya	Standing	84	75	78	83	320	1063
60	Dismus Onyiego	Kenya	Kneeling	84	93	88	92	357	1063
61	César Batista	Portugal	Prone	96	99	98	100	393	1057
61	César Batista	Portugal	Standing	72	83	60	90	305	1057
61	César Batista	Portugal	Kneeling	89	92	89	89	359	1057
62	Juan Antonio Valencia	El Salvador	Prone	95	97	98	98	388	1053
62	Juan Antonio Valencia	El Salvador	Standing	81	81	80	75	317	1053
62	Juan Antonio Valencia	El Salvador	Kneeling	88	90	81	89	348	1053
63	Mário Ribeiro	Portugal	Prone	93	96	93	97	379	1051
63	Mário Ribeiro	Portugal	Standing	78	85	76	84	323	1051
63	Mário Ribeiro	Portugal	Kneeling	82	92	84	81	349	1051
64	John Muhato	Kenya	Prone	96	96	97	97	386	1040
64	John Muhato	Kenya	Standing	83	78	76	73	310	1040
64	John Muhato	Kenya	Kneeling	87	84	88	85	344	1040
65	Italo Casali	San Marino	Prone	97	94	92	91	374	1026
65	Italo Casali	San Marino	Standing	75	79	76	75	305	1026
65	Italo Casali	San Marino	Kneeling	87	89	89	82	347	1026
66	Adelbert Nico	Virgin Islands	Prone	93	94	98	97	382	1017
66	Adelbert Nico	Virgin Islands	Standing	73	70	72	71	286	1017
66	Adelbert Nico	Virgin Islands	Kneeling	90	87	86	86	349	1017
67	Francis Boisson	Monaco	Prone	95	97	93	90	375	1004
67	Francis Boisson	Monaco	Standing	77	74	81	71	303	1004
67	Francis Boisson	Monaco	Kneeling	83	79	79	85	326	1004
68	Libero Casali	San Marino	Prone	91	90	90	92	363	997
68	Libero Casali	San Marino	Standing	72	58	69	81	280	997
68	Libero Casali	San Marino	Kneeling	91	85	90	88	354	997
69	Salvador Sanpere	Virgin Islands	Prone	94	89	92	93	368	979
69	Salvador Sanpere	Virgin Islands	Standing	73	78	74	72	297	979
69	Salvador Sanpere	Virgin Islands	Kneeling	79	83	71	81	314	979
—	Daya Rajasinghe Nadarajasingham	Ceylon	Prone						DNS
—	Daya Rajasinghe Nadarajasingham	Ceylon	Standing						DNS
—	Daya Rajasinghe Nadarajasingham	Ceylon	Kneeling						DNS
—	Owen Phillips	British Honduras	Prone						DNS
—	Owen Phillips	British Honduras	Standing						DNS
—	Owen Phillips	British Honduras	Kneeling						DNS
—	Alberto Santiago	Puerto Rico	Prone						DNS
—	Alberto Santiago	Puerto Rico	Standing						DNS
—	Alberto Santiago	Puerto Rico	Kneeling						DNS
