= 1977 European 300 m Rifle Championships =

- Dates: 9 - 11 September
- Host city: Winterthur, Switzerland
- Level: Senior
- Events: 10 men (5 individual + 5 team)

The 1977 European 300 m Rifle Championships was the 2nd edition of the 300 m rifle competition, European 300 m Rifle Championships, organised by the International Shooting Sport Federation as a stand alone championships after 18 years from the first edition held in 1959.

== Results ==
=== Men ===
Event	Gold		Silver		Bronze	
Event	Athletes	Pts	Athletes	Pts	Athletes	Pts
300 m rifle 3 positions	(Soviet Union) Gennadi Lushikov	1147	(Soviet Union) Viktor Vlasov	1140	(United Kingdom) Malcolm Cooper	1140
300 m rifle 3 positions, team	Soviet Union; Gennadi Lushikov; Viktor Vlasov......		Switzerland; Hürzeler; Charles Jermann......		Finland; Juhani Laakso.........	
300 m rifle standard	(Soviet Union) Gennadi Lushikov	566	(Norway) Tore Hartz	563	(Soviet Union) Viktor Nikolaev	563
300 m rifle standard, team	Soviet Union; Gennadi Lushikov; Viktor Nikolaev; Evgeni Holostchanov...		Switzerland............		Norway; Tore Hartz.........	
300 m rifle kneeling	(Switzerland) Charles Jermann	383	(Norway) Tore Hartz	383	(Soviet Union) Evgeni Holostchanov	380
300 m rifle kneeling, team	Soviet Union; Gennadi Lushikov; Viktor Vlasov; Evgeni Holostchanov...		Norway; Tore Hartz.........		Switzerland; Charles Jermann; Max Huerzeler......	
300 m rifle standing	(United Kingdom) Malcolm Cooper	379	(Soviet Union) Gennadi Lushikov	375	(Soviet Union) Viktor Vlasov	371
300 m rifle standing, team	Soviet Union; Gennadi Lushikov; Viktor Vlasov; Evgeni Holostchanov...		Sweden; Stefan Thynell; Sven Johansson......		Switzerland; Charles Jermann; Max Huerzeler......	
300 m rifle prone	(Poland) Eugeniusz Pędzisz	396	(Soviet Union) Gennadi Lushikov	396	(Finland) Juhani Laakso	396
300 m rifle prone, team	Switzerland; Anton Müller; Charles Jermann; Walter Inderbitzin...		Soviet Union; Gennadi Lushikov; Viktor Vlasov......		Finland; Juhani Laakso.........	

== Medal table ==
Host country

#	Country	1st place, gold medalist(s)	2nd place, silver medalist(s)	3rd place, bronze medalist(s)	Tot.
1	Soviet Union	6	4	3	13
2	Switzerland	2	2	2	6
3	Great Britain	1	0	1	2
4	Poland	1	0	0	1
5	Norway	0	3	1	4
6	Sweden	0	1	0	1
7	Finland	0	0	3	3
Total		10	10	10	30

== See also ==
- European Shooting Confederation
- International Shooting Sport Federation
- ISSF shooting events
- List of medalists at the European Shooting Championships
- List of medalists at the European Shotgun Championships
