= Shooting at the 1973 SEAP Games =

Shooting events at the 1973 Southeast Asian Peninsular Games was held between 2 and 7 September at Mount Vernon Shooting Club, Singapore.

== Medal summary ==
=== Men's ===
Event	Gold		Silver		Bronze	
Clay Pigeon	(Malaysia) Ally Ong	135 pts	(Singapore) Tang Kee Kong	131	(Thailand) Pichit Busapawongsai	122
Team Clay Pigeon	Malaysia Ally Ong; Edmund Yong; Stanley Lim; Yap Pow Thong	529	Singapore Frank Oh; Tang Kee Kong; David Oh; Peter Ho	505	Thailand	461
Free Pistol	(Thailand) Sutham Aswanit	532 pts	(South Vietnam) Hồ Minh Thu	519	(Malaysia) Wang Siew Meng	516
Team Free Pistol	(Thailand) THAILAND	2067	(South Vietnam) SOUTH VIETNAM	2027	(Malaysia) MALAYSIA	2006
Centre Fire Pistol	(Thailand) Viraj Visessiri	581 pts	(Singapore) Loh Kok Heng	573	(South Vietnam) Luong Hien Dun	570
Team Fire Pistol	(Thailand) THAILAND	2272 pts	(South Vietnam) SOUTH VIETNAM	2253	(Singapore) SINGAPORE	2182
Air Pistol	(Thailand) Vinich Chareonsiri	379 pts	(South Vietnam) Nguyễn Văn Xuân	374	(Kingdom of Laos) S. Thammavongsa	370
Team Air Pistol	(Thailand) THAILAND	1464 pts	(South Vietnam) SOUTH VIETNAM	1445	(Singapore) SINGAPORE	1411
Air Rifle	(Myanmar) Kyaw Shein	379 pts	(Thailand) Paisarn Chamornmarn	375	(Singapore) Lauw Peng Eng	362
Team Air Rifle	(Thailand) THAILAND	1464 pts	(Myanmar) BURMA	1445	(Singapore) SINGAPORE	1411
Rapid Fire	(Thailand) Viraj Visessiri	585 pts (rec)	(Singapore) Loh Kok Heng	570	(Malaysia) Chan Koon Yau	566
Team Rapid Fire	(Thailand) THAILAND	2325 pts	(Singapore) SINGAPORE	2212	(Malaysia) MALAYSIA	2124
Target Rifle	(Singapore) Mok Hong Heen	173 pts	(Khmer Republic) In Yao	168	(Myanmar) Kyaw Shein	163
Team Target Rifle	(Singapore) SINGAPORE	550 pts	(Myanmar) BURMA	515	(Khmer Republic) KHMER REPUBLIC	471
Service Rifle	(Singapore) Din Hassan	173 pts	(Myanmar) Kyaw Shein	168	(Kingdom of Laos) Bounmak Xongmixay	163
Team Service Rifle	(Singapore) SINGAPORE	478 pts	(Myanmar) BURMA	419	(Kingdom of Laos) LAOS	345
Trap	(Thailand) C. Pavit	173 pts	(Singapore) Tang Kee Kong	168	(Malaysia) Tunku Mahkota Johor	163
Team Trap	(Thailand) THAILAND	501 pts	(Singapore) SINGAPORE	483	(Malaysia) MALAYSIA	476
Standard Rifle	(Thailand) Chawalit Kamutchati	549 pts	(Myanmar) Kyaw Shein	547	(Singapore) Loh Kok Heng	532
Team Standard Rifle	(Myanmar) BURMA	2175 pts (rec)	(Thailand) THAILAND	2170	(Singapore) SINGAPORE	2090
Small Bore Rifle	(Thailand) Chawalit Kamutchati	590 pts	(Myanmar) Kyaw Shein	586	(Singapore) Daniel Perreau	581
Team Small Bore Rifle	(Thailand) THAILAND	2344 pts	(Myanmar) BURMA	2333	(Malaysia) MALAYSIA	2302

== Medal table ==
Rank	Nation	Gold	Silver	Bronze	Total
1	Thailand (THA)	14	2	2	18
2	Singapore (SIN)	4	7	7	18
3	Burma (BIR)	2	7	1	10
4	Malaysia (MAS)	2	0	7	9
5	South Vietnam (VNM)	0	5	1	6
6	Cambodia (KHM)	0	1	1	2
7	Laos (LAO)	0	0	3	3
Totals (7 entries)		22	22	22	66
