= Loh Ah Chee =

Malaysian sports shooter

Personal information
- Born: 1 April 1922 Singapore, Straits Settlements
- Died: 31 October 1997 (aged 75)

Sport
- Sport: Sports shooting

Loh Ah Chee (1 April 1922 – 31 October 1997) was a Singaporean sports shooter.

Loh was a senior police officer, serving as Chief Weapons Instructor at the shooting ranges of Beach Road Police Station and the Police Training School. He also maintained membership in various gun clubs.

Loh competed in the 1959 SEAP Games in silhouette shooting, winning a bronze medal.

Loh competed for Malaysia in the 25 metre pistol event at the 1964 Summer Olympics. Loh retired from sports the following year. Along with Kok Kum Woh, Fred de Souza and Fung Lok Nam, Loh is credited with introducing Singaporeans into international sports shooting during the event.

He was the father and mentor of Loh Kok Heng, who competed as a sports shooter for Singapore in the 1968 Summer Olympics.
