= Michel Fontaine =

Michel Fontaine may refer to:

- Michel Fontaine (sport shooter)
- Michel Fontaine (politician)
