= Vergov =

Vergov is a surname. Notable people with the surname include:

- Emiliyan Vergov (born 1942), Bulgarian sports shooter
- Julian Vergov (born 1970), Bulgarian actor
