= Phil Lawrence =

Phil Lawrence can refer to:

- Phil Lawrence (sailor) (born 1955), British Olympic sailor
- Phil Lawrence (sport shooter) (born 1945), British Olympic sport shooter
