= Hürzeler =

Hürzeler is a surname. Notable people with the name include:

- Arnold Hürzeler, Swiss footballer, played for FC Basel in the 1920s
- Fabian Hürzeler (born 1993), German football coach
- Max Hürzeler (born 4 1954), Swiss cyclist
- Max Hürzeler (sport shooter) (born 1950), Swiss sports shooter
- Roland Hürzeler (1945–2023), Swiss gymnast
