= Shooting at the 2023 Pan American Games – Men's skeet =

Men's skeet at the 2023 Pan American Games
- Venue: Polígono de Tiro de Pudahuel
- Dates: 21–22 October
- Competitors: 27 from 15 nations

Medalists
Gold medal	Vincent Hancock	United States
Silver medal	Federico Gil	Argentina
Bronze medal	Nicolás Pacheco	Peru

The Men's skeet event at the 2023 Pan American Games took place on 21 and 22 October at the Polígono de Tiro de Pudahuel. The current Olympic champion Vincent Hancock confirmed gold, Argentine Federico Gil won silver, and bronze medalist in Lima, Nicolás Pacheco, repeated the feat once again.

== Schedule ==
All times are Chile Standard Time (UTC-3)

Date	Time	Round
October 21–22	9:30	Qualification
October 22	15:00	Final

== Results ==
Rank	Athlete	Country	Day 1	Day 2	Total	Final
1st place, gold medalist(s)	Vincent Hancock	United States	75	50	125	57
2nd place, silver medalist(s)	Federico Gil	Argentina	73	49	122	55
3rd place, bronze medalist(s)	Nicolás Pacheco	Peru	75	48	123	44
4	Héctor Flores	Chile	71	48	119	32
5	Luis Bermudez III	Puerto Rico	70	48	118	23
6	Luis Gallardo	Mexico	71	46	117	20
7	Sergio Romero	Independent Athletes Team	70	46	116	DNQ
8	Michael Maskell	Barbados	72	44	116	DNQ
9	Carlos Segovia	Mexico	70	45	115	DNQ
10	Dustan Taylor	United States	69	46	114	DNQ
11	Jorge Atalah	Chile	69	45	114	DNQ
12	Roberth de Oliveira	Brazil	70	44	114	DNQ
13	Sebastian Bermudez	Independent Athletes Team	70	43	113	DNQ
14	Julio Dujarric	Dominican Republic	65	47	112	DNQ
15	Trysten Curran-Routledge	Canada	69	42	111	DNQ
16	Stefano Hazoury	Dominican Republic	62	48	110	DNQ
17	Luis Isa	Ecuador	64	46	110	DNQ
18	Renato Araújo	Brazil	67	43	110	DNQ
19	Miguel Pizarro	Puerto Rico	67	43	110	DNQ
20	Richard McBride	Canada	68	42	110	DNQ
21	Nicolás Giha	Peru	65	44	109	DNQ
22	Guillermo Torres	Cuba	65	44	109	DNQ
23	Leandro González	Argentina	64	44	108	DNQ
24	José González	Cuba	63	44	107	DNQ
25	Mario de Genna	Ecuador	64	40	104	DNQ
26	Marco Chu	Panama	61	42	103	DNQ
27	José del Castillo	Panama	60	36	96	DNQ
