= Jaime Santiago =

Jaime Santiago may refer to:

- Jaime Santiago (sport shooter)
- Jaime Santiago (police officer)
