= Patrice de Mullenheim =

French sports shooter

Personal information
- Born: 10 November 1949 (age 76)

Sport
- Sport: Sports shooting

Patrice de Mullenheim (born 10 November 1949) is a French former sports shooter. He competed in the 50 metre rifle, three positions event at the 1972 Summer Olympics.
