= Takeshi Sugita =

Japanese sports shooter

Personal information
- Born: 6 November 1947 (age 78)

Sport
- Sport: Sports shooting

Takeshi Sugita (杉田 武, Sugita Takeshi; born 6 November 1947) is a Japanese former sports shooter. He competed in the 50 metre rifle, prone event at the 1972 Summer Olympics.
