= Jens Nygård (sport shooter) =

Norwegian sports shooter (1934–2005)

Personal information
- Born: 7 August 1934 Haltdalen, Norway
- Died: 3 September 2005 (aged 71) Haltdalen, Norway
- Height: 183 cm (6 ft 0 in)
- Weight: 80 kg (176 lb)

Sport
- Sport: Sports shooting
- Club: Norske Offiserers Pistolklub, Oslo

Jens Jensen Nygård (7 August 1934 – 3 September 2005) was a Norwegian sports shooter. He placed 69th in the 50 metre rifle, prone event at the 1972 Summer Olympics.
