= Salvador Sanpere =

United States Virgin Islands sport shooter

Personal information
- Born: 1 November 1938 (age 87)

Sport
- Sport: Sports shooting

Salvador Sanpere (born 1 November 1938) is a former sports shooter from the United States Virgin Islands. He competed in the 50 metre rifle, three positions event at the 1972 Summer Olympics.
