= Douglas Mast =

American Sports shooter (1944–2002)

Personal information
- Born: 7 April 1944 New York, New York, United States
- Died: 24 April 2002 (aged 58) Chesapeake Bay, United States

Sport
- Sport: Sports shooting

Douglas Mast (7 April 1944 – 24 April 2002) was a sports shooter from the United States Virgin Islands. He competed in the 50 metre rifle, prone event at the 1972 Summer Olympics.
