= Wongsak Malaipun =

Thai sports shooter

Personal information
- Nationality: Thai
- Born: 6 November 1935 (age 89)

Sport
- Sport: Sports shooting

Wongsak Malaipun (born 6 November 1935) is a Thai sports shooter. He competed in the men's 50 metre rifle, prone event at the 1976 Summer Olympics.
