= Hasse Persson (sport shooter) =

Danish sports shooter (born 1942)

Personal information
- Full name: Hasse Greis Persson
- Nationality: Danish
- Born: 16 August 1942 (age 82); Copenhagen, Denmark

Sport
- Sport: Sports shooting

Hasse Greis Persson (born 16 August 1942) is a Danish sports shooter. He competed in the men's 50 metre rifle, prone event at the 1976 Summer Olympics.
