= Jacques Pichon =

French sports shooter

Personal information
- Nationality: French
- Born: 31 December 1949 (age 75)

Sport
- Sport: Sports shooting

Jacques Pichon (born 31 December 1949) is a French sports shooter. He competed in the men's 50 metre rifle, prone event at the 1976 Summer Olympics.
