= Robert Houman =

Belgian sports shooter

Personal information
- Born: 29 September 1927 Ath, Belgium

Sport
- Sport: Sports shooting

Robert Houman (born 29 September 1927) is a Belgian former sports shooter. He competed in the 50 metre rifle, prone event at the 1972 Summer Olympics.
