= Chira Prabandhayodhin =

Thai sports shooter

Personal information
- Born: 21 May 1939 (age 86)

Sport
- Sport: Sports shooting

Chira Prabandhayodhin (born 21 May 1939) is a Thai former sports shooter. He competed in the 50 metre rifle, prone event at the 1972 Summer Olympics.
