= Jurgen Wevers =

Dutch footballer

Personal information
- Full name: Jurgen Wevers
- Date of birth: 12 January 1979 (age 47)
- Place of birth: Winterswijk, Netherlands
- Height: 2.02 m (6 ft 8 in)
- Position: Goalkeeper

Senior career*
| Years | Team | Apps | (Gls) |
| 1999–2004 | De Graafschap | 59 | (0) |
| 2004–2010 | RKC Waalwijk | 32 | (0) |
| 2010–2011 | FC Oss | 24 | (0) |
- * Club domestic league appearances and goals as of 2 April 2011 (UTC)

Jurgen Wevers (born 12 January 1979 in Winterswijk, Gelderland) was a Dutch professional footballer who played as a goalkeeper for FC Oss before taking up other roles at the club including goalkeeping coach. He formerly played for De Graafschap and RKC Waalwijk.
