= Silvester Knipfer =

German sports shooter

Personal information
- Born: 20 December 1939 Munich, Germany
- Died: 29 November 2010 (aged 70)

Sport
- Sport: Sports shooting

Silvester Knipfer (20 December 1939 – 29 November 2010) was a German sports shooter. He competed in the 50 metre rifle, prone event at the 1972 Summer Olympics for West Germany.
