= Suthorn Parmkerd =

Thai sports shooter

Personal information
- Nationality: Thai
- Born: 2 May 1934 (age 90)

Sport
- Sport: Sports shooting

Suthorn Parmkerd (born 2 May 1934) is a Thai sports shooter. He competed in the men's 50 metre rifle, prone event at the 1976 Summer Olympics.
