= Gheorghe Vasilescu =

Romanian sports shooter

Personal information
- Nationality: Romanian
- Born: 26 February 1935; Bucharest, Romania
- Died: 1993 (aged 57–58); Vartoapele de Jos

Sport
- Sport: Sports shooting

Gheorghe Vasilescu (26 February 1935 – 1993) was a Romanian sports shooter. He competed in the men's 50 metre rifle, prone event at the 1976 Summer Olympics.
