= John Fong Yew =

Trinidad and Tobago sports shooter

Personal information
- Nationality: Trinidad and Tobago
- Born: 13 August 1932 (age 92)

Sport
- Sport: Sports shooting

John Fong Yew (born 13 August 1932) is a Trinidad and Tobago sports shooter. He competed in the men's 50 metre rifle, prone event at the 1976 Summer Olympics.
