= Anthony Greenfield =

British sports shooter

Personal information
- Nationality: British
- Born: 11 December 1931; Croydon, England
- Died: August 2004; Bangor, Wales

Sport
- Sport: Sports shooting

Anthony Greenfield (11 December 1931 – August 2004) was a British sports shooter. He competed in the men's 50 metre rifle, prone event at the 1976 Summer Olympics.
