= Herman Brock Jr. =

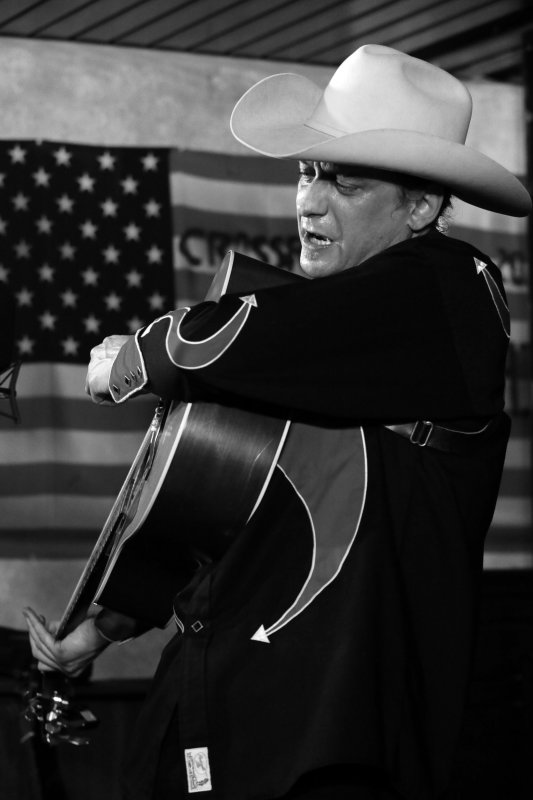

Background information
- Also known as: Brock
- Born: September 18, 1970 (age 54); Winterswijk, Netherlands
- Origin: Terneuzen, The Netherlands
- Genres: Americana, bluegrass, outlaw country
- Occupation(s): Musician, songwriter
- Instrument(s): Guitar, vocals, mandolin, banjo, autoharp
- Years active: 1986–present
- Labels: Rootsworld
- Website: www.hermanbrockjr.com

Herman Brock Jr. (born September 18, 1970) is a Dutch left-handed bluegrass, Americana and blues musician, multi-instrumentalist and singer-songwriter. He is also author of the series 'Secrets of the guitar'.

== Biography ==
Herman was born in Winterswijk, and grew up in Terneuzen in the Netherlands. He played guitar with his father Herman Brock Sr's FFFF-band as a teenager. His main instruments are vocals and guitar, but also plays banjo, mandolin, autoharp and dulcimer.

== Bands ==
In 1999, Brock formed the Eurocasters band with bassist Lizz Sprangers.

In 2003, the album Straight Up! was recorded in Palmer, Texas, with contributions from Mike Morgan, Hash Brown and Holland K. Smith.

Brock's last Eurocasters' album Coco Loco was recorded in 2005 in Austin, Texas. Produced by Jesse Dayton, with Erik Hokkanen and Redd Volkaert. Dayton in turn recorded two songs by Herman on his album South Austin Sessions.

In 2006, Brock formed his bluegrass and old-time trio Brock & The Brockettes with Lizz Sprangers and Geertje van den Berg.

Since 2009 he also plays with his Bluegrass band Brock's Blue Grass Bunch.

== Discography ==
=== Own bands ===
- 2022: Herman Brock Jr. – Devianto
- 2019: Herman Brock Jr. – "Freedom" – single
- 2016: Herman Brock Jr. – "Lust for life" / "Live your life to the limit" – single
- 2015: Herman Brock Jr. – The Old World
- 2009: Brock's Blue Grass Bunch – Brock's Blue Grass Bunch
- 2007: Brock & The Brockettes – Gather around the mic – ASIN: B0011V9R7E
- 2005: Herman Brock Jr. & The Eurocasters – Coco Loco
- 2003: Herman Brock Jr. & The Eurocasters – Straight Up! – ASIN: B000FTKRDG
- 2002: Herman Brock Jr. & The Eurocasters – The Devil's Got A Hold On Me
- 1999: Herman Brock Jr. & The Eurocasters – Demo 1999

=== As guest musician ===
- 2005: Jesse Dayton – South Austin Sessions
- 1993: Brock Family – Land of Jubilee
- 1991: Herman Brock & The FFFF – State 51

== Bibliography ==
Secrets of the guitar – series:

- How to use the CAGED guitar chords system – ASIN: B00A7L7D8O
- How to read tabs and tablature – ASIN: B00796EYRI
- How to play basic open guitar chords for beginners – ASIN: B00BKQR920
- How to play the blues guitar scale in E [minor] – ASIN: B007JWPT26
- How to play the E minor pentatonic scale – ASIN: B007BBYKOI
- How to play the G major pentatonic scale – ASIN: B007ZVGSOO
- How to play the aeolian or natural minor scale in A – ASIN: B007S94IEA
- How to play Do-Re-Mi, the Ionian or major Scale in C – ASIN: B009YK1MIQ
- How to play mixolydian or southern rock scale in G – ASIN: B00AY79J6U
