= John Muhato =

Kenyan sports shooter

Personal information
- Born: 1 February 1954
- Died: 15 July 2005 (aged 51)

Sport
- Sport: Sports shooting

John Muhato (1 February 1954 –15 July 2005) was a Kenyan sports shooter. He competed in the 50 metre rifle, three positions event at the 1972 Summer Olympics.
