= Mike Watt (sport shooter) =

New Zealand sport shooter

Personal information
- Full name: Michael Prendeville Watt
- Born: 31 July 1936 Wellington, New Zealand
- Died: 29 March 2015 (aged 78)

Sport
- Sport: Sports shooting

Michael Prendeville Watt (31 July 1936 – 29 March 2015) was a New Zealand sports shooter. He competed in the 50 metre rifle, prone event at the 1972 Summer Olympics, finishing in 29th place.

Born in Wellington on 31 July 1936, Watt was educated at Wellesley College and Scots College. Much of his working life was spent with P&O Shipping in office administration. He died on 29 March 2015.
