= Simon Ekeno =

Kenyan sports shooter

Personal information
- Born: 10 February 1946 (age 80)

Sport
- Sport: Sports shooting

Simon Ekeno (born 10 February 1946) is a Kenyan former sports shooter. He competed in the 50 metre rifle, prone event at the 1972 Summer Olympics.
