= Karl Fröschl =

Austrian sports shooter (1926–2003)

Personal information
- Born: 2 November 1926
- Died: 2003 (aged 76–77)

Sport
- Sport: Sports shooting

Karl Fröschl (2 November 1926 – 2003) was an Austrian sports shooter. He competed in the 50 metre rifle, prone event at the 1972 Summer Olympics. Fröschl died in 2003.
