= Kurt Mitchell =

Canadian sports shooter

Personal information
- Born: 19 November 1951; Lethbridge, Alberta, Canada
- Died: 17 May 2007 (aged 55); Paris, Ontario, Canada

Sport
- Sport: Sports shooting

Kurt Mitchell (19 November 1951 – 17 May 2007) was a Canadian sports shooter. He competed in the men's 50 metre rifle three positions event at the 1976 Summer Olympics.
