= Don Gowland =

Australian sports shooter

Personal information
- Nationality: Australian
- Born: 31 August 1940 (age 84)

Sport
- Sport: Sports shooting

Don Gowland (born 31 August 1940) is an Australian sports shooter. He competed in the men's 50 metre rifle, prone event at the 1976 Summer Olympics.
