= Eduardo Arroyo (sport shooter) =

Bolivian sports shooter (born 1932)

Personal information
- Born: 11 May 1932 (age 94)

Sport
- Sport: Sports shooting

Eduardo Arroyo (born 11 May 1932) is a Bolivian former sports shooter. He competed in the 50 metre rifle, prone event at the 1972 Summer Olympics.
