= Russell Dove =

Australian sports shooter

Personal information
- Born: 22 September 1928
- Died: 19 April 2016 (aged 87)

Sport
- Sport: Sports shooting

Russell Dove (22 September 1928 – 19 April 2016) was an Australian sports shooter. He competed in the 50 metre rifle, prone event at the 1972 Summer Olympics.
