= Winterswijk =

- Municipality and town
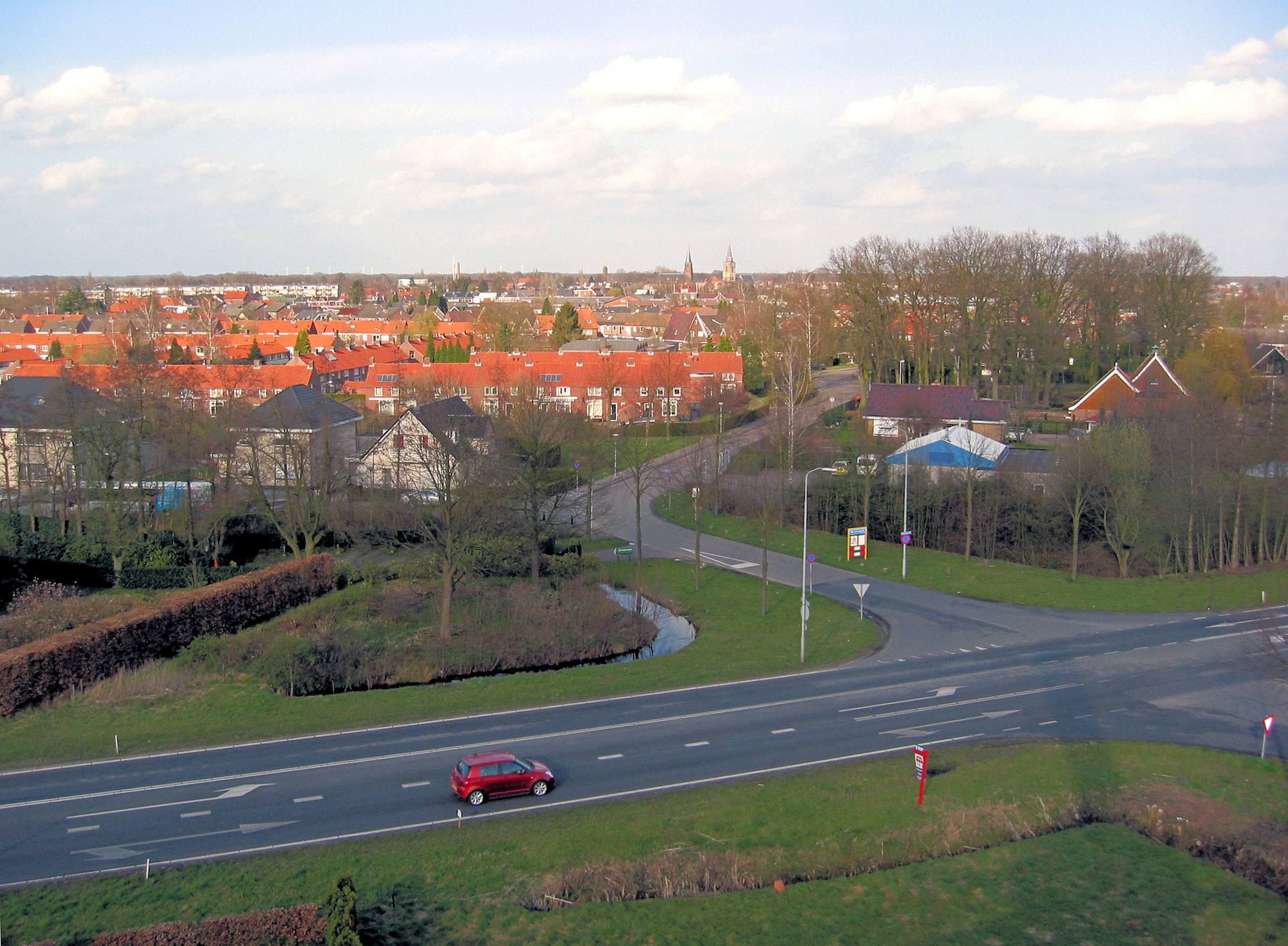
- Winterswijk seen from Venemansmolen windmill

- Flag Coat of arms

- Location in Gelderland
- Coordinates: 51°58′N 6°43′E
- Country: Netherlands
- Province: Gelderland

Government
  - Body: Municipal council
  - Mayor: Baukje Dijkstra

Area
  - Total: 138.82 km^{2} (53.60 sq mi)
  - Land: 138.14 km^{2} (53.34 sq mi)
  - Water: 0.68 km^{2} (0.26 sq mi)
- Elevation: 37 m (121 ft)

Population (January 2021)
  - Total: 29,022
  - Density: 210/km^{2} (540/sq mi)
- Demonym: Winterswijker
- Time zone: UTC+1 (CET)
  - Summer (DST): UTC+2 (CEST)
- Postcode: 7100–7119
- Area code: 0543
- Website: www.winterswijk.nl

Winterswijk (Dutch pronunciation: [ˌʋɪntərsˈʋɛik]; also known as Winterswiek or Wenters) is a municipality and a town in the eastern Netherlands. It has a population of 29,022 and is situated in the Achterhoek, which lies in the easternmost part of the province of Gelderland in the Netherlands.

It was also known as Winethereswick, Winriswic or Wenterswic; the Low Saxon wich or wic means the living place of a certain person. The person would likely have been called Wenether, Winitar or Winter.

== Geography ==
Winterswijk is located in east of the province of Gelderland in the east of the Netherlands. It is part of the region of Achterhoek.

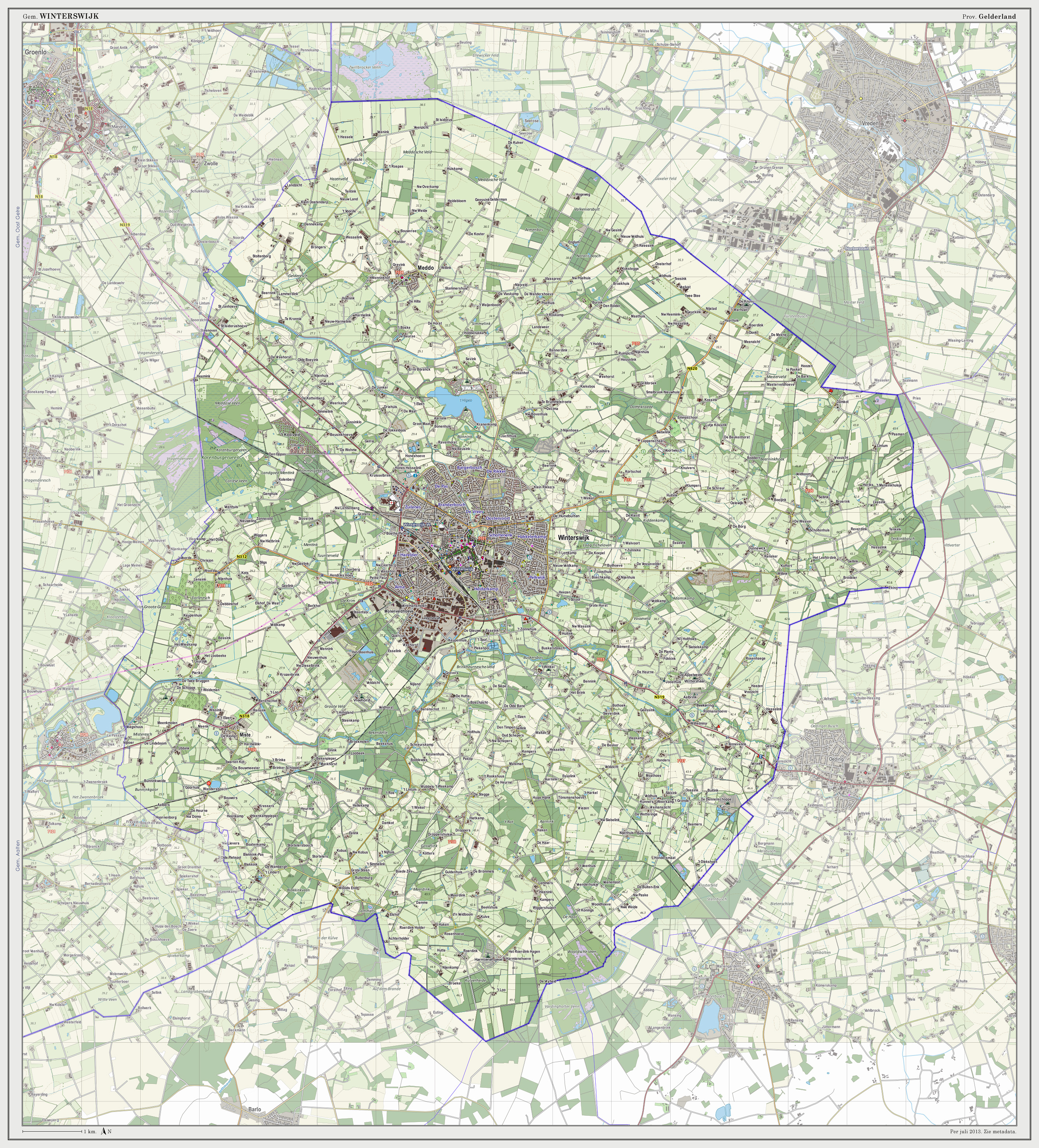
Topographic map of the municipality of Winterswijk, 2013

== History ==
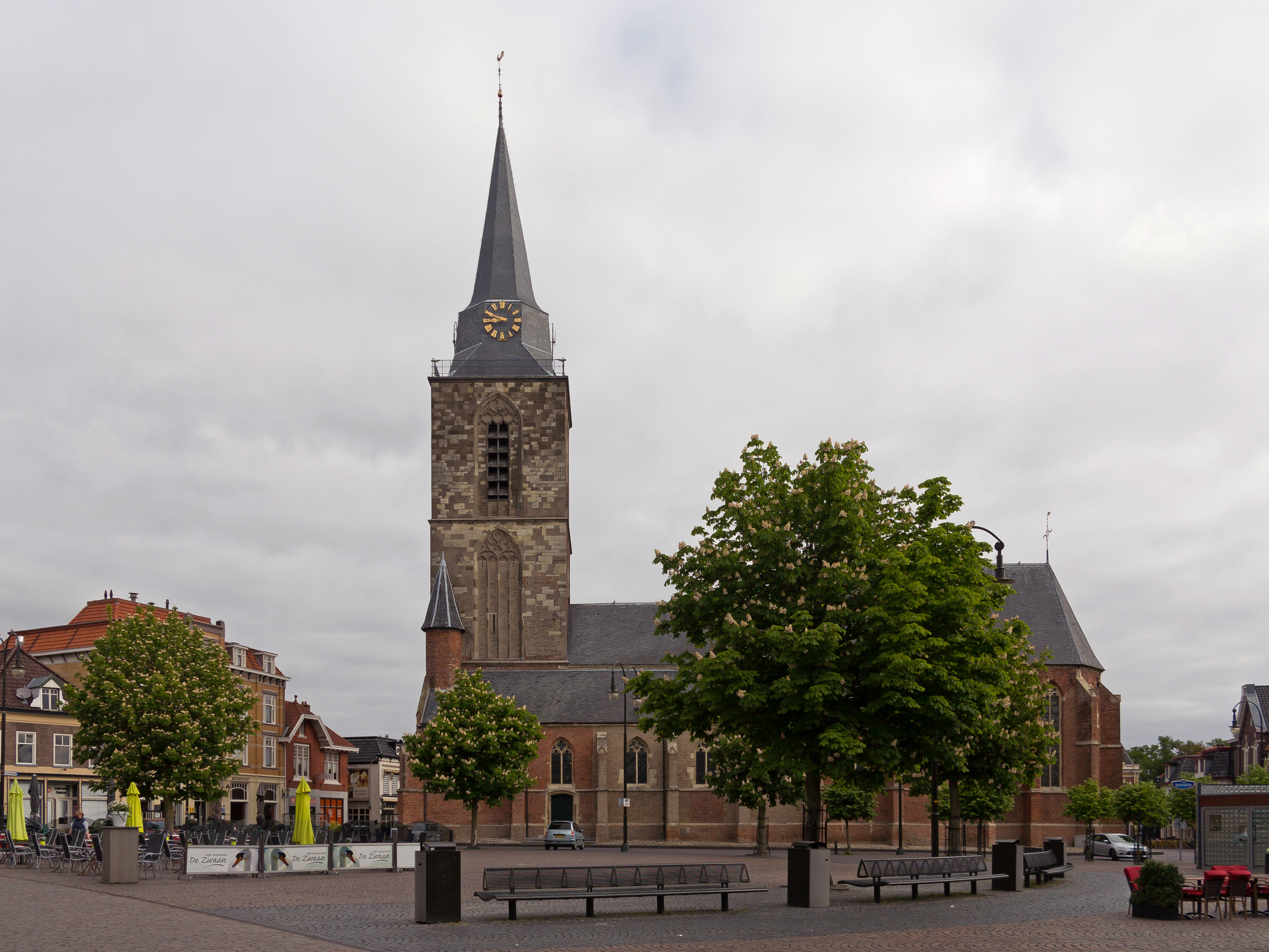
Winterswijk, church: de Jacobskerk

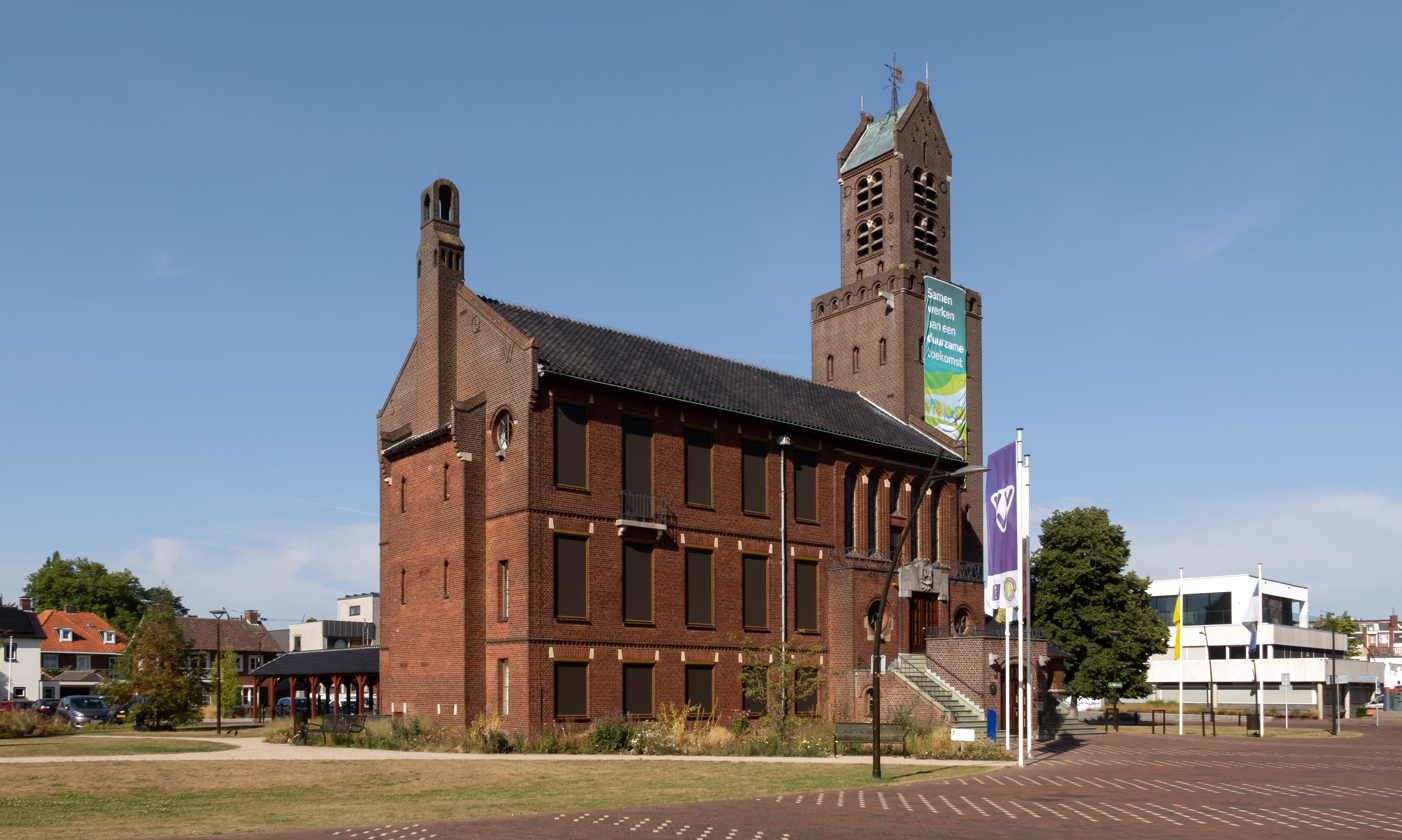
Winterswijk, former townhall

Founded around 1000 AD, it remained an isolated farming community until 1830 when the road from Borken to Zutphen via Winterswijk and Groenlo was built. Around 1840, many emigrated to America — Michigan in particular. After 1870, the town became a centre for textiles, such as spinning and weaving and indeed the Tricot factory employed a large proportion of the local population in its heyday. In 1878, the railway line to Zutphen was built primarily for the textile industry, which was set up by Jan Willink. Some of the families such as the Willinks have lived there since 1284.

=== World War II and liberation ===
Winterswijk was liberated on 31 March 1945. The day prior, on 30 March there was a tank battle in one of the townships called Woold, with sixty Sherman tanks. The 53rd Welsh Division and the 3rd British Infantry Division, were moving from Bocholt via Aalten to Winterswijk. The tank battle resulted in sixteen German and nine British soldiers losing their lives. On 31 March, around nine AM allied forces had a struggle just over five kilometers (three miles) south of Winterswijk following reinforcements from the NSB. On 31 March, the first allied troops finally reached the Slingestream near Winterswijk. 31 March is marked as the official day to remember the liberation of Winterswijk, despite the fact that in the late afternoon of 31 March parts of Miste and Woold were already liberated. After the liberation of Winterswijk, they founded a Rest-Centre for British soldiers in the Sociëteit de Eendracht, where the British soldiers, could find some rest.

Although the Jewish community of Winterswijk was greatly decimated during the war, a synagogue still exists. Yet no regular services are being held. The synagogue is open for visitors and guided tours.

== Railway stations ==
- Winterswijk
- Winterswijk West

== Notable residents ==
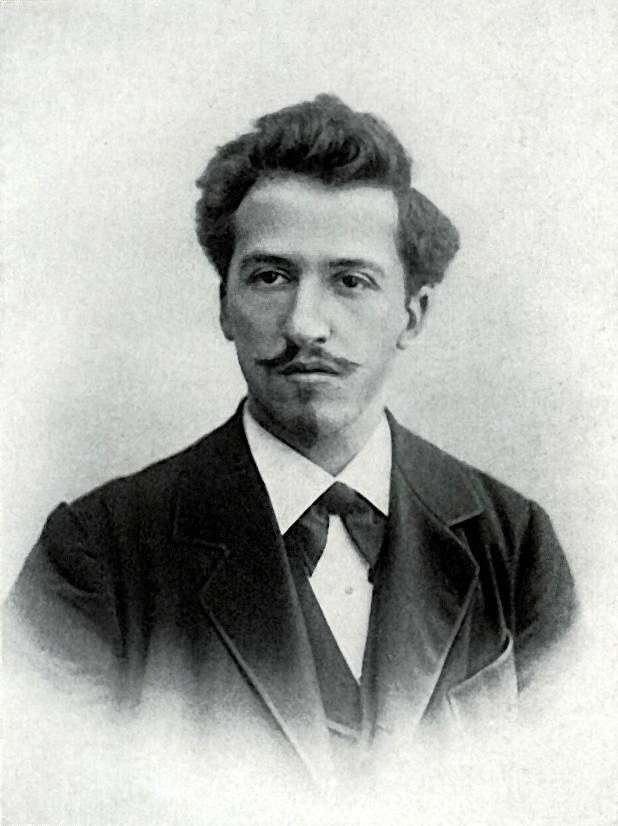
Piet Mondriaan, 1899

- John H. Corscot (1839–1926), mayor of Madison, Wisconsin, 1893 to 1895
- Piet Mondriaan (1872–1944), painter, pioneer of 20th century abstract art, lived in Winterswijk ages 8–20
- Willem van Otterloo (1907–1978), conductor, cellist, composer
- Max van Dam (1910–1943) artist, murdered in the Sobibor extermination camp
- Johanna Reiss (born 1932), Dutch-American writer, longtime resident of New York City
- Bram Stemerdink (born 1936), politician, Minister of Defence 1976/77
- Gerrit Komrij (1944-2012) poet, novelist, critic, journalist and playwright
- Dick Mol (born 1955) paleontologist and specialist in the field of mammoths
- Johan Houwers (born 1957) politician, real estate broker and convicted mortgage fraudster
- Herman Brock Jr. (born 1970) left-handed Dutch bluegrass, Americana and Blues musician

=== Sport ===
- Willy Hillen (born 1943 - died 2026) former sports shooter, competed at the 1972 and 1976 Summer Olympics
- Jan Vreman (born 1965), football manager and former player for De Graafschap
- Martijn Meerdink (born 1976), football player
- Jurgen Wevers (born 1979), football goalkeeper
- Myrthe Schoot (born 1988) volleyball player, competed at the 2016 Summer Olympics
- Stef Dusseldorp (born 1989), racing driver

== Gallery ==
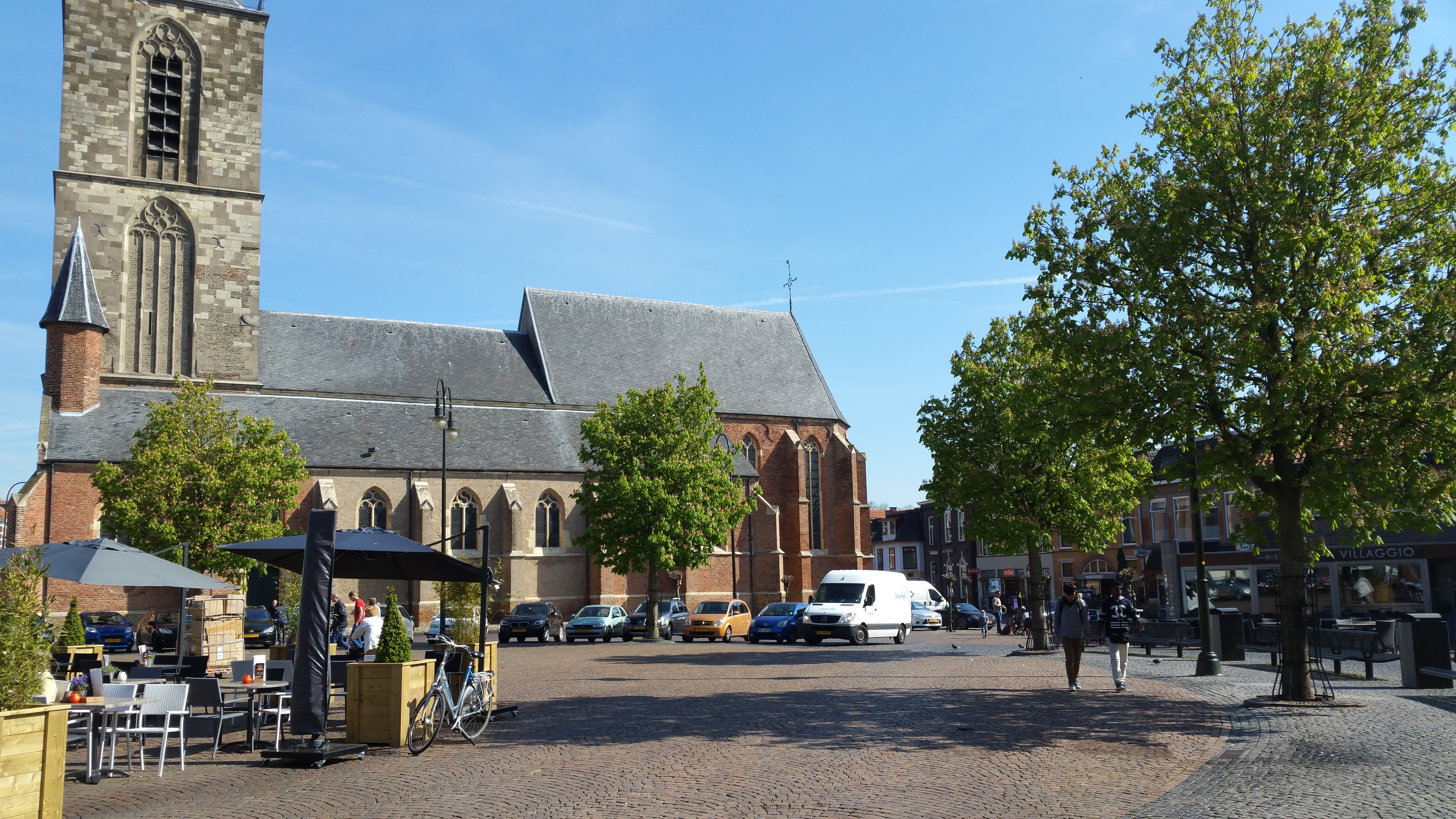
Marktplein with church (Jacobskerk)

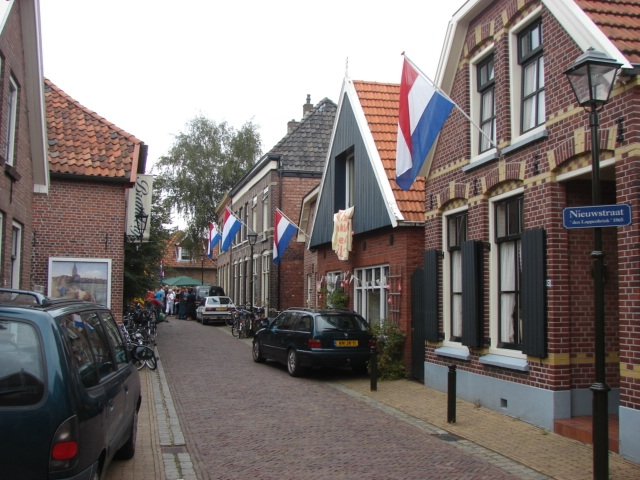
Nieuwstraat

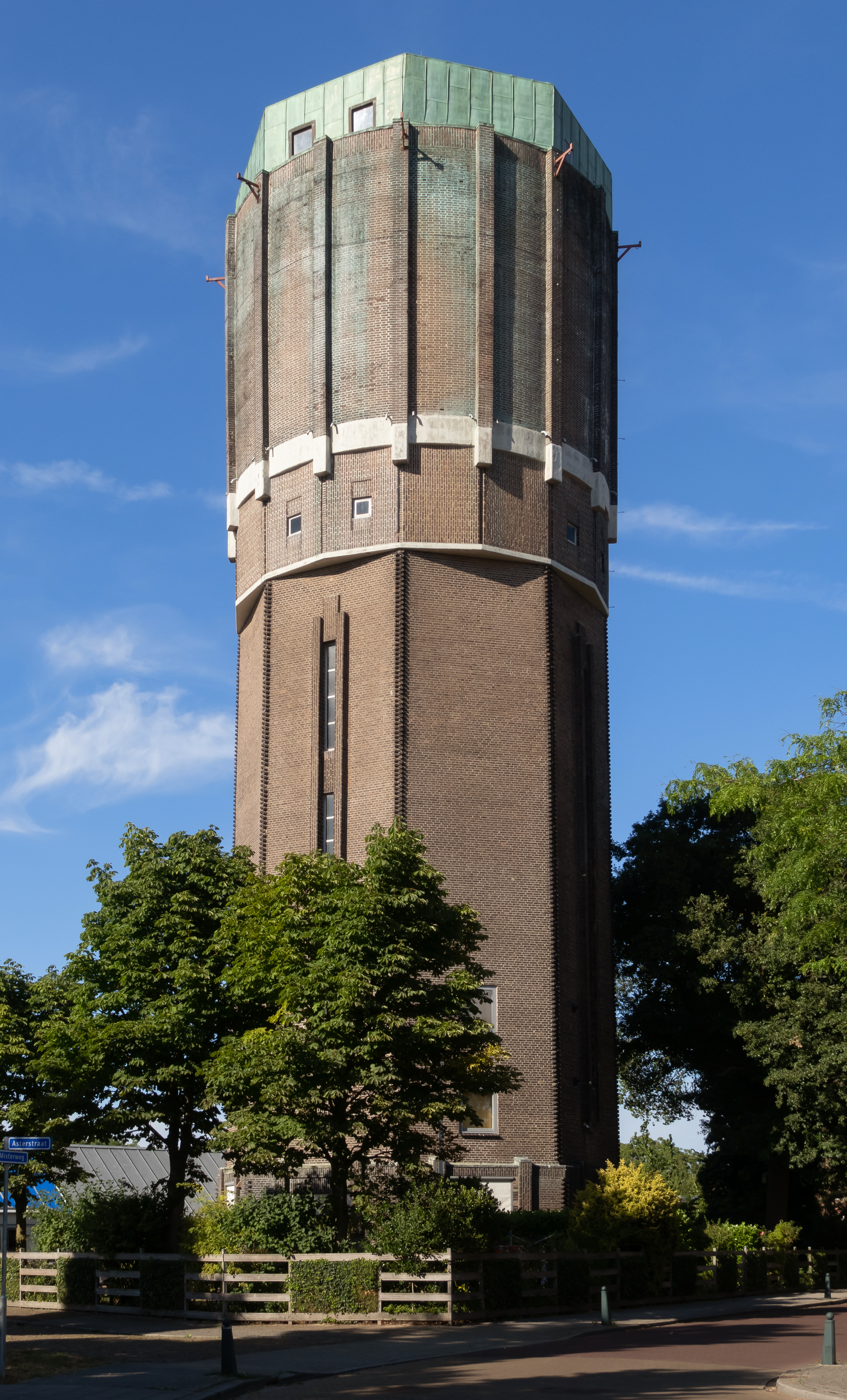
Water tower

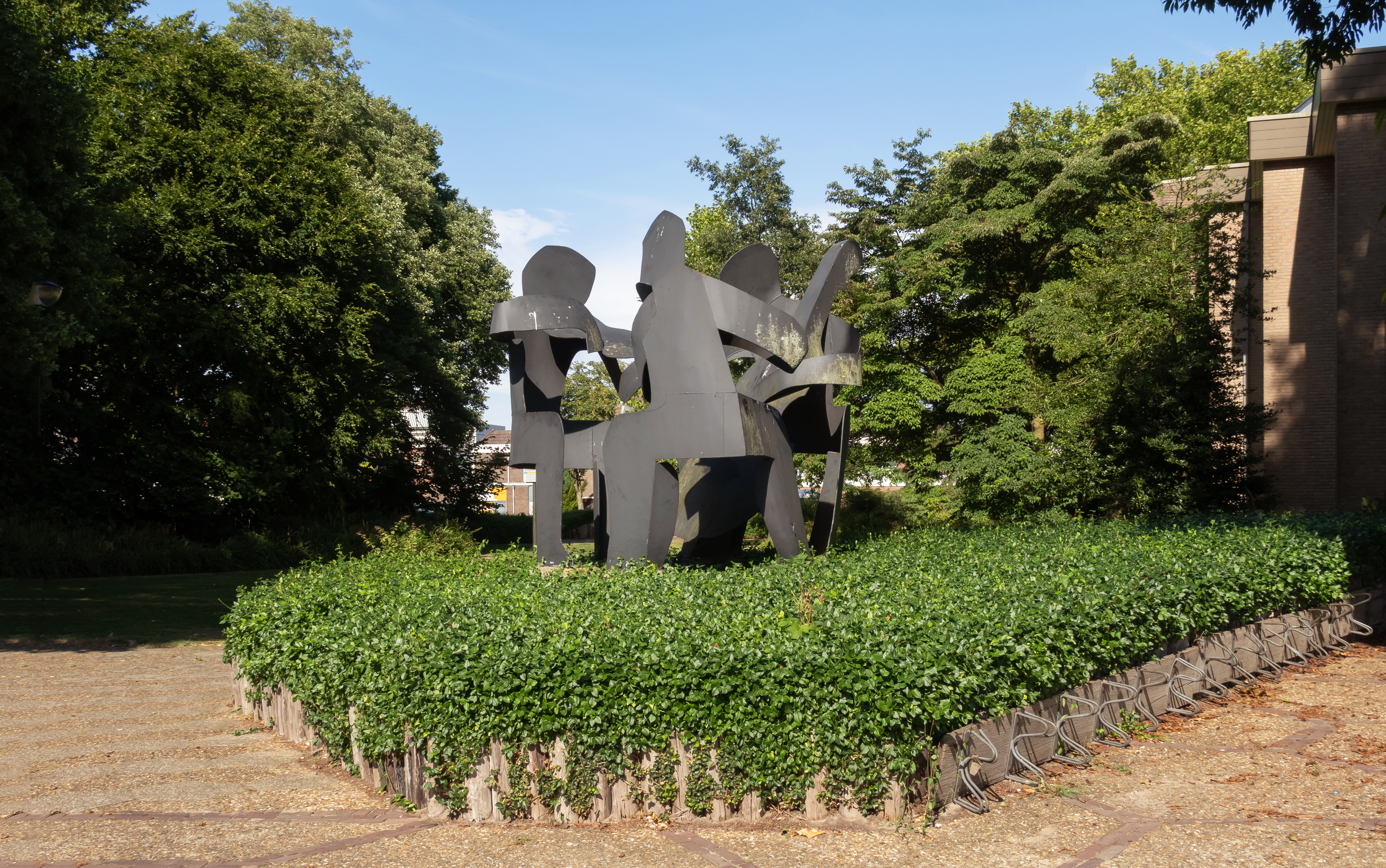
Sculpture: the Strijktrio (String Trio) designed by Jan Bons

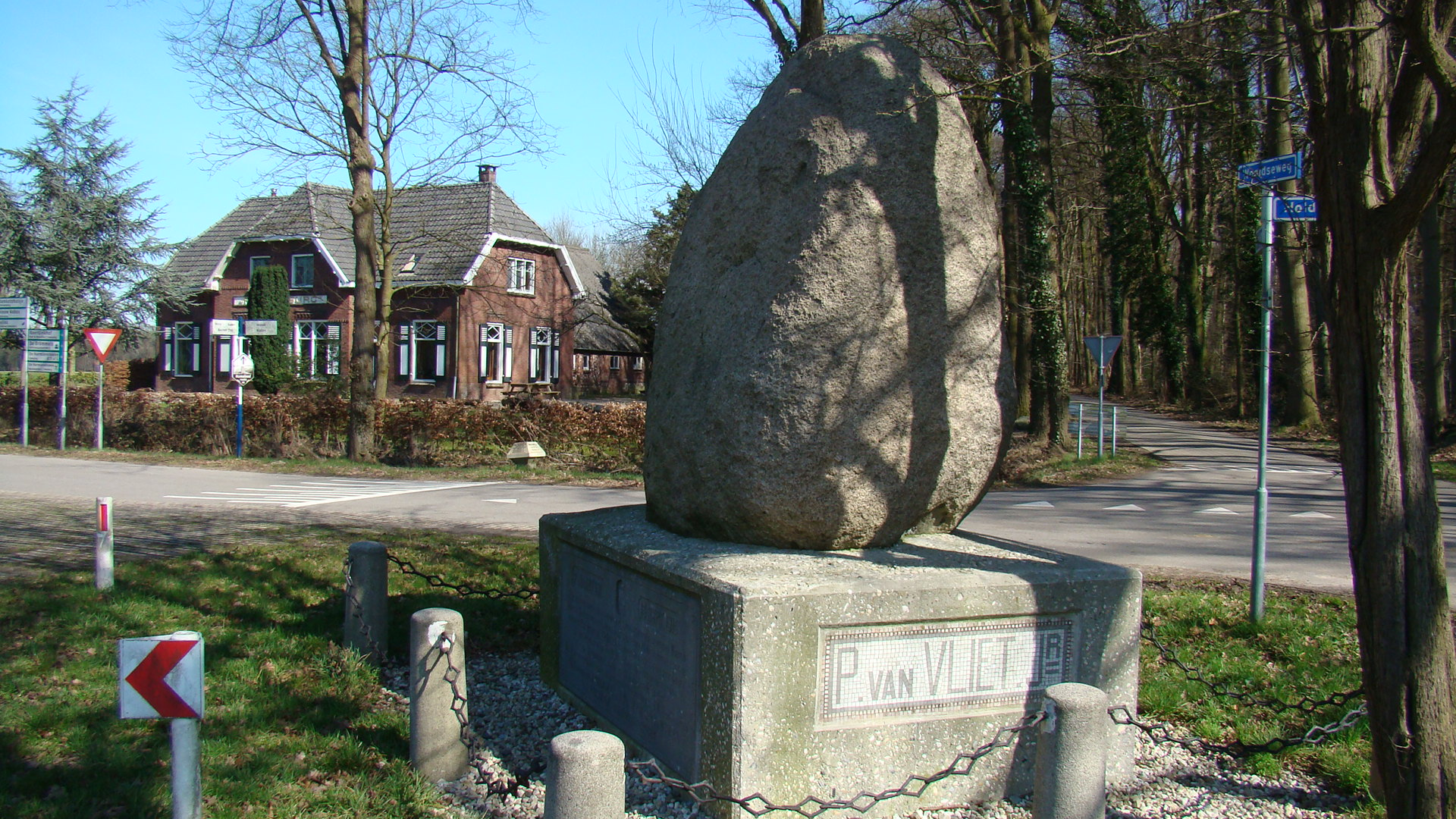
Great stone at Woold, Winterswijk
