= Federico Gil (sport shooter) =

Argentine sports shooter

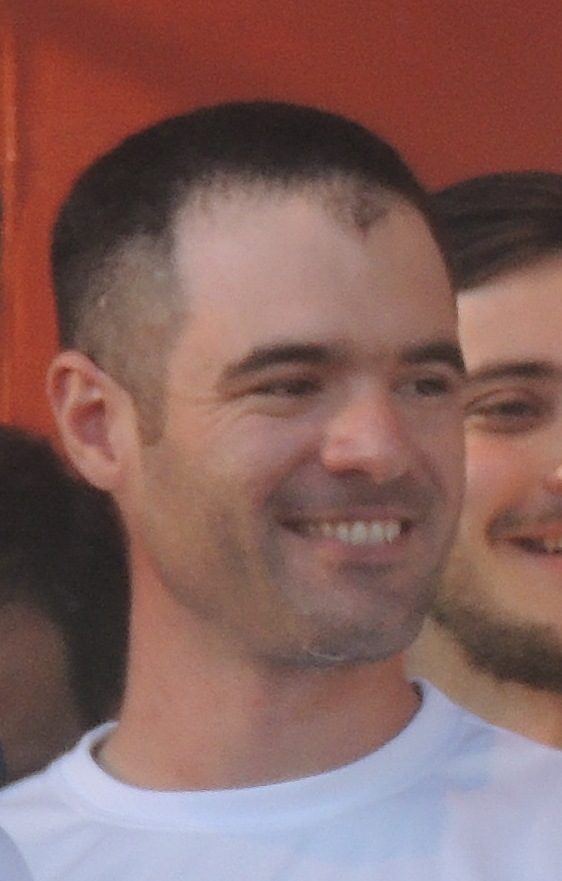
- Gil during the torch relay of the 2018 Summer Youth Olympics

Personal information
- Full name: Federico Gonzalo Gil
- Born: 29 April 1988 (age 38) Buenos Aires, Argentina, Arrecifes
- Height: 175 cm (5 ft 9 in)
- Weight: 78 kg (172 lb)

Sport
- Country: Argentina
- Sport: Sports shooting
- Event: Skeet

Achievements and titles
- Olympic finals: Rio 2016
Medal record
Men's shooting
Representing Argentina
Pan American Games
Silver medal – second place	2023 Santiago	Skeet

Federico Gil (born 29 April 1988) is an Argentine sports shooter. He competed in the men's skeet event at the 2016 Summer Olympics. He finished in 27th place. He qualified to represent Argentina at the 2020 Summer Olympics.

His sister is fellow Olympian Melisa Gil.
