= Karlheinz Smieszek =

German sport shooter (born 1948)

Medal record

Men's sport shooting

Representing West Germany

Olympic Games
Gold medal – first place	1976 Montreal	50 metre rifle prone

Karlheinz Smieszek (born 5 August 1948 in Kitzingen, Bavaria) is a sport shooter and Olympic champion for West Germany. He won a gold medal in the 50 metre rifle prone event at the 1976 Summer Olympics in Montreal.
