= Prithipal Chatterjee =

Indian sports shooter (born 1943)

Personal information
- Born: 19 October 1943 (age 82)

Sport
- Sport: Sports shooting

Prithipal Chatterjee (born 19 October 1943) is an Indian former sports shooter. He competed in the 50 metre rifle, prone event at the 1972 Summer Olympics.
