= Lee Kyun =

South Korean sports shooter

Personal information
- Nationality: South Korean
- Born: 14 October 1948 (age 77)

Sport
- Sport: Sports shooting

Lee Kyun (born 14 October 1948) is a South Korean sports shooter. He competed in the men's 50 metre rifle, prone event at the 1976 Summer Olympics.
