= Adelbert Nico =

Sports shooter from the US Virgin Islands

Personal information
- Born: 18 February 1944 (age 82)

Sport
- Sport: Sports shooting

Adelbert Nico (born 18 February 1944) is a former sports shooter from the United States Virgin Islands. He competed in the 50 metre rifle, three positions event at the 1972 Summer Olympics.
