= Stefan Krastev =

Bulgarian sports shooter

Personal information
- Nationality: Bulgarian
- Born: 12 June 1953 (age 71)

Sport
- Sport: Sports shooting

Stefan Krastev (Bulgarian: Стефан Кръстев; born 12 June 1953) is a Bulgarian sports shooter. He competed in the men's 50 metre rifle, prone event at the 1976 Summer Olympics.
