= Jaakko Asikainen =

Finnish sport shooter

Personal information
- Born: 26 January 1941 Ekenäs, Finland
- Died: 4 November 2017 (aged 76)

Sport
- Sport: Sports shooting

Jaakko Asikainen (26 January 1941 – 4 November 2017) was a Finnish sports shooter. He competed in the 50 metre rifle, prone event at the 1972 Summer Olympics.
