= Beach Road Police Station =

Former police station in Singapore

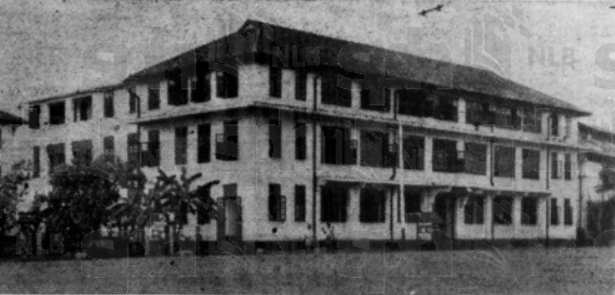
- The station in 1935.

General information
- Status: Completed
- Location: 120 Beach Road, Singapore 189769

Beach Road Police Station is a former police station in Beach Road, Singapore. Opened in 1934, the police station had the Singapore Police's "toughest division". Although closed in 1988, the building was conserved in 2002, and declared a historical site in 2003. It is integrated into the Guoco Midtown development.

== History ==
Beach Road Police station opened in 1934 as part of the Singapore Police's expansion plans in response to the growing population, and had the police's "toughest division". During the Japanese occupation of SIngapore, the Japanese military used the building to hold Jewish, Chinese, and Indian people before they were sent to Changi Prison; it was also used as a registration centre as part of an evacuation scheme to the Riau Islands towards the end of the Japanese occupation. In the early 1970s, the building's living quarters were refurbished into offices. In May 1988, Beach Road Police Station closed, with its staff relocated to Geylang Police Station, as there was a population shift to the east side of Singapore. The National Cadet Corps was to occupy the building, yet the Central Police Station moved into the Beach Road building by April 1989. The building was conserved in 2002, and was declared as a historical site in 2003. As part of the Guoco Midtown development, works were conducted on the building, including changing windows and repainting the walls. As of 2024, only the holding cell block and a three storey U-shaped block remained, with a Japanese restaurant occupying the holding cell block.
