= Michel Fontaine (sport shooter) =

French sports shooter (1934–2005)

Michel
Personal information
- Full name: Michel Henri Robert Fontaine
- Born: 26 January 1934 Charleville-Mézières, France
- Died: 5 April 2005 (aged 71) Vannes, France

Sport
- Sport: Sports shooting

Michel Henri Robert Fontaine (26 January 1934 – 5 April 2005) was a French sports shooter. He competed in the 50 metre rifle, prone event at the 1972 Summer Olympics. Fontaine died in Vannes on 5 April 2005, at the age of 71.
