= Micha Kaufman (sport shooter) =

Israeli sports shooter

Mikael "Micha" Kaufm
Personal information
- Birth name: מיכה קאופמן
- Born: January 3, 1946 (age 79)
- Height: 5-6.5 (170 cm)
- Weight: 150 lb (68 kg)

Sport
- Country: Israel
- Sport: Sport shooting
- Events: Mixed Small-Bore Rifle, Prone, 50 metres; Mixed Small-Bore Rifle, Three Positions, 50 metres

Mikael "Micha" Kaufman (Hebrew: מיכה קאופמן; born January 3, 1946) is an Israeli former Olympic sport shooter.

Kaufman competed for Israel at the 1976 Summer Olympics in Montreal, Canada, at the age of 30, in mixed 50 metre rifle prone, and came in tied for 12th. He also competed in mixed 50 metre rifle three positions, and came in tied for 51st.
