= Max Hürzeler (sport shooter) =

Swiss sports shooter

Personal information
- Nationality: Swiss
- Born: 19 September 1950 (age 74)

Sport
- Sport: Sports shooting

Max Hürzeler (born 19 September 1950) is a Swiss sports shooter. He competed in the men's 50 metre rifle three positions event at the 1976 Summer Olympics. He also won multiple national championships.
