= Jiří Vogler =

Czech sport shooter (born 1946)

Personal information
- Born: 2 February 1946 (age 80) Přerov, Czechoslovakia

Sport
- Country: Czechoslovakia
- Sport: Sport shooting
- Event: 50 metre rifle, prone event

Jiří Vogler (born 2 February 1946) is a Czech former sport shooter. He competed in the 50 metre rifle, prone event at the 1972, 1976 and 1980 Summer Olympics.
