= Charles Jermann =

Swiss sports shooter

Personal information
- Nationality: Swiss
- Born: 15 May 1937 (age 87)

Sport
- Sport: Sports shooting

Charles Jermann (born 15 May 1937) is a Swiss sports shooter. He competed in the men's 50 metre rifle three positions event at the 1976 Summer Olympics.
