= Pasquale Raschi =

Sammarinese sports shooter

Personal information
- Nationality: Sammarinese
- Born: 19 October 1946 (age 79)

Sport
- Sport: Sports shooting

Pasquale Raschi (born 19 October 1946) is a Sammarinese sports shooter. He competed at the 1976 Summer Olympics, the 1980 Summer Olympics and the 1984 Summer Olympics.

At the time of his Olympic participation, he worked as a traffic officer.
