= Arne Sorensen (sport shooter) =

Canadian sports shooter (1934–2018)

Personal information
- Born: 21 January 1934; Varde, Denmark
- Died: 19 May 2018 (aged 84); Calgary, Alberta, Canada

Sport
- Sport: Sports shooting

Arne Sorensen (21 January 1934 – 19 May 2018) was a Canadian sports shooter. He competed in the 50 metre rifle, three positions event at the 1972 Summer Olympics.
