= Victor Auer =

American sport shooter

Personal information
- Born: March 24, 1937 Santa Ana, California, United States
- Died: May 3, 2011 (aged 74) Thousand Oaks, California, United States

Sport
- Sport: Sport shooting
Medal record
Men's shooting
Representing United States
Olympic Games
Silver medal – second place	1972 Munich	50 m rifle prone

Victor Lee "Vic" Auer (March 24, 1937 – May 3, 2011) was a sport shooter and Olympic medalist for the United States. He won a silver medal in the 50 metre rifle prone event at the 1972 Summer Olympics in Munich. He was born in Santa Ana, California. Auer's career was as a television scriptwriter.
