= Viktor Nikolaev =

Russian geologist (1893–1960)

Viktor Arsenyevich Nikolaev (Russian: Виктор Арсеньевич Николаев; 7 December 1893 – 25 September 1960) was a Russian and Soviet geologist and petrographer. He was a specialist on the petrology and deep crustal structure of the Tien Shan region. The so-called "Nikolaev Line" is a fault that separates the northern and central Tien Shan ranges.

Nikolaev was born in Nizhny Novgorod where his father Arseny Ivanovich was a store clerk married to Yekaterina Petrovna. After schooling in Novgorod, he joined the mining institute at St. Petersburg where he studied under E.S. Fedorov, V.V. Nikitin, K.I. Bogdanovich. He then worked on surveys in Pechory and worked on hydrology from 1914. In 1915 he worked in the northern Tien Shan range and he studied the volcanic strata which resulted in his thesis published ten years later. In 1917 he worked with N.G. Kassin surveying along the Murmansk rail line. He graduated in geology in 1918. In 1920 he became a geologist with the Geological Committee and surveyed in Turkestan along with V. N. Weber and D. I. Mushketov. They produced a geological map at the 1:420000 scale. His work on the Zeravshan River helped in irrigation of the Samarkand oasis.

He examined faults in the Tien Shan region and helped in delineating tectonic zones. This separation has been called the "Nikolaev Line". He also studied petrological processes and considered theoretical aspects of silicate formation under pressure and involving reactions with water and carbon dioxide.
