= Loh Kok Heng =

Singaporean sports shooter (born 1949)

Personal information
- Born: 6 June 1949 (age 77) Singapore

Sport
- Sport: Sports shooting

Loh Kok Heng (born 6 June 1949) is a Singaporean former sports shooter. He competed in two events at the 1968 Summer Olympics.

He is the son of Loh Ah Chee, who taught him the sport.
