= José González (Cuban sport shooter) =

Cuban sports shooter

Personal information
- Nationality: Cuban
- Born: 15 October 1947 (age 77)

Sport
- Sport: Sports shooting

José González (born 15 October 1947) is a Cuban sports shooter. He competed in the men's 50 metre rifle, prone event at the 1976 Summer Olympics.
