= Phil Lawrence (sport shooter) =

British sports shooter

Personal information
- Born: 17 March 1945 (age 81)

Sport
- Sport: Sports shooting

Phil Lawrence (born 17 March 1945) is a British former sports shooter. He competed in the 50 metre rifle, prone event at the 1972 Summer Olympics.
