= Kok Kum Woh =

Singaporean sports shooter

Personal information
- Born: 18 May 1915 Singapore
- Height: 180 cm (5 ft 11 in)
- Weight: 100 kg (220 lb)

Sport
- Sport: Sports shooting

Kok Kum Woh (born 18 May 1915, date of death unknown) was a Singaporean sports shooter. He competed for Singapore at the 1960 Summer Olympics and for Malaysia at the 1964 Summer Olympics. He also competed at the 1962 and 1966 Asian Games.
