= Jaime Santiago (sport shooter) =

Puerto Rican sports shooter

Personal information
- Born: 17 September 1942 (age 83) Ponce, Puerto Rico

Sport
- Sport: Sports shooting

Jaime Santiago Villalongo (born 17 September 1942) is a Puerto Rican former sports shooter. He competed in the 50 metre rifle, prone event at the 1972 Summer Olympics. Graduated from Colegio San Ignacio de Loyola. He is a member of Phi Sigma Alpha fraternity.
