= Preeda Phengdisth =

Thai sports shooter (born 1931)

Personal information
- Born: 2 April 1931

Sport
- Sport: Sports shooting

Preeda Phengdisth (born 2 April 1931) is a Thai former sports shooter. He competed in the 50 metre rifle, three positions event at the 1972 Summer Olympics.
