= Anton Müller (sport shooter) =

Swiss sports shooter

Personal information
- Nationality: Swiss
- Born: 12 February 1947 (age 79)

Sport
- Sport: Sports shooting

Achievements and titles
- Olympic finals: 1976 Summer Olympics; 1984 Summer Olympics

Anton Müller (born 12 February 1947) is a Swiss sports shooter. He competed at the 1976 Summer Olympics and the 1984 Summer Olympics.
