= Ri Ho-jun =

North Korean sports shooter (born 1946)

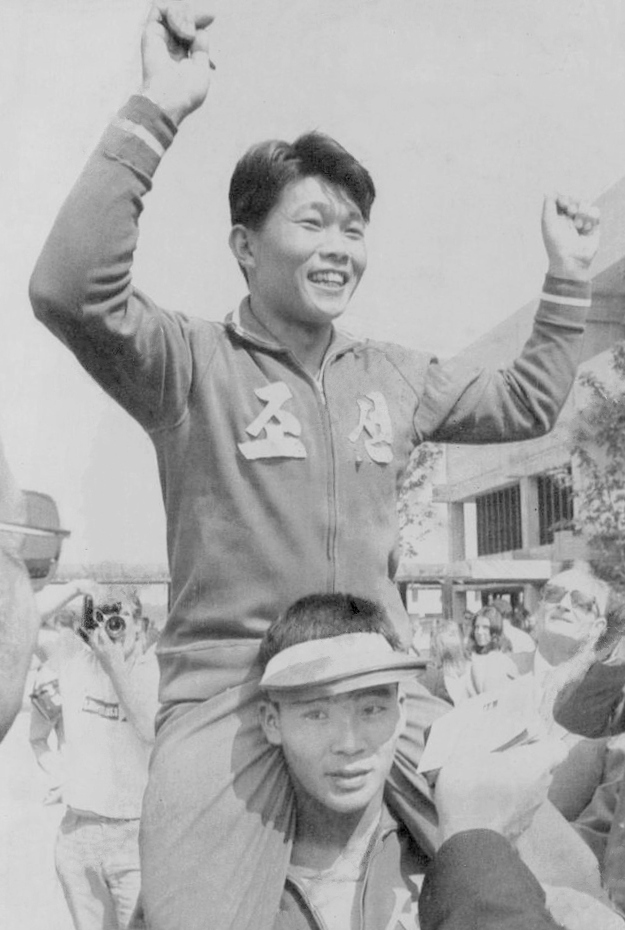
- Ri Ho-jun at the 1972 Olympics

Personal information
- Born: 1 December 1946 (age 79)
- Height: 176 cm (5 ft 9 in)
- Weight: 75 kg (165 lb)

Sport
- Sport: Sports shooting
Medal record
Representing North Korea
Olympic Games
Gold medal – first place	1972 Munich	50 m rifle prone

- Ri Ho-jun
- Hangul: 리호준
- RR: Ri Hojun
- MR: Ri Hojun

Ri Ho-jun (Korean: 리호준, born 1 December 1946) is a North Korean retired sports shooter and Olympic Champion. He won a gold medal in the 50 metre rifle prone event at the 1972 Summer Olympics in Munich, the country's first ever Olympic gold medal. In August 1972 he was awarded the title of Merited Master of Sport of the USSR. He also competed at the 1976 Summer Olympics and the 1980 Summer Olympics.

Ri also taught shooting sports to North Korea's future leader, Kim Jong-il. Ri later became his closest bodyguard.
