= Hans Adlhoch (sport shooter) =

German-born Canadian sport shooter

Personal information
- Nationality: Canadian
- Born: 10 April 1935 (age 91) Heidelberg, Germany
- Height: 1.77 m (5 ft 10 in)
- Weight: 70 kg (150 lb)

Sport
- Sport: Shooting

Hans Adlhoch (born 10 April 1935) is a German-born Canadian sport shooter. He competed in the 1976 Summer Olympics.
