= Nam Sang-wan =

South Korean sports shooter

Personal information
- Born: 15 January 1935 (age 91) Buyeo, South Chungcheong

Sport
- Country: South Korea
- Sport: Sports shooting
- Team: ROK Army

Korean name
- Hangul: 남상완
- Hanja: 南相完
- RR: Nam Sangwan
- MR: Nam Sangwan

Nam Sang-wan (born 15 January 1935) is a South Korean former sports shooter. He competed in the 300 metre rifle event at the 1964 Summer Olympics.
