= Choo Hwa-il =

South Korean sports shooter (born 1932)

Personal information
- Nationality: South Korean
- Born: 30 April 1932 (age 94) Wando, South Jeolla

Sport
- Sport: Sports shooting

Korean name
- Hangul: 추화일
- Hanja: 秋化日
- RR: Chu Hwail
- MR: Ch'u Hwail

Choo Hwa-il (Korean: 추화일; born 30 April 1932) is a South Korean former sports shooter. He competed at the 1956 Summer Olympics, the 1964 Summer Olympics and five editions of Asian Games from 1958 to 1974.
