= Nehemia Sirkis =

Israeli sports shooter (1932–2018)

Personal information
- Native name: נחמיה סירקיס
- Born: 22 March 1932 Tel Aviv, Mandatory Palestine
- Died: 2018 (aged 85–86) United States

Sport
- Sport: Sports shooting

Nehemia Sirkis (Hebrew: נחמיה סירקיס; 22 March 1932 – 2018) was an Israeli sports shooter and firearms designer.

== Background ==
Sirkis competed at the 1964 Summer Olympics and the 1968 Summer Olympics. He also competed at the 1966 and 1970 Asian Games. Sirkis was a member of the Israeli national shooting team for 20 years and won the Israeli title seven times during his athletic career.

In later years, Sirkis became a noted designer of various US and Israeli firearms, including the Detonics Pocket 9, the Dan sniper rifle and the Sardius SD-9 pistol, which would serve as the base for the Intratec CAT line of pistols. He died in the United States in 2018.
