= Huh Wook-bong =

South Korean sports shooter

Personal information
- Born: 1 March 1934 (age 92) Boseong, South Jeolla

Sport
- Country: South Korea
- Sport: Sports shooting
- Team: ROK Army

Korean name
- Hangul: 허욱봉
- Hanja: 許旭鳳
- RR: Heo Ukbong
- MR: Hŏ Ukpong

Huh Wook-bong (born 1 March 1934) is a South Korean former sports shooter. He competed in two events at the 1964 Summer Olympics.
