= Kyaw Shein =

Burmese sports shooter

Personal information
- Born: 8 March 1938 (age 88)

Sport
- Sport: Sports shooting

Kyaw Shein (born 8 March 1938) is a Burmese former sports shooter. He competed in the 50 metre rifle, prone event at the 1964 Summer Olympics. He also competed at the 1962, 1966 and 1970 Asian Games.
