= Shin Hyun-joo =

South Korean sport shooter

Personal information
- Born: 2 August 1934 (age 91) Dangjin, South Chungcheong

Sport
- Country: South Korea
- Sport: Sports shooting
- Team: ROK Army

Korean name
- Hangul: 신현주
- Hanja: 申鉉柱
- RR: Sin Hyeonju
- MR: Sin Hyŏnju

Shin Hyun-joo (Korean: 신현주; born 2 August 1934) is a South Korean former sports shooter. He competed in two events at the 1964 Summer Olympics.
