= Jouko Hietalahti =

Finnish sports shooter

Personal information
- Nationality: Finnish
- Born: 17 August 1944 (age 80); Ruovesi, Finland

Sport
- Sport: Sports shooting

Jouko Hietalahti (born 17 August 1944) is a Finnish sports shooter. He competed in two events at the 1976 Summer Olympics.
