= Willy Hillen =

Dutch sports shooter

Personal information
- Born: Willem Hendrik Hillen; 22 April 1943 Winterswijk, Netherlands
- Died: 14 March 2026 (age 82) Oost Gelre

Sport
- Sport: Sports shooting

Willy Hillen (born 22 April 1943 - died 14 March 2026) was a Dutch sports shooter. He competed at the 1972 Summer Olympics and the 1976 Summer Olympics. As a coach, he also trained the Dutch air rifle team who later participated in the European Championship and contributed to training of youth groups.

In his hometown of Winterswijk, he was also famous for the frikandels the special recipe of which he keeps secret. He died on 14 March 2026, aged 82.
