= Stefan Thynell =

Swedish sports shooter

Personal information
- Nationality: Swedish
- Born: 10 September 1954 (age 70); Hässleholm, Sweden

Sport
- Sport: Sports shooting

Stefan Thynell (born 10 September 1954) is a Swedish engineer and former sports shooter. He competed at the 1976 Summer Olympics and the 1980 Summer Olympics. Thynell joined the Mechanical Engineering Department at Pennsylvania State University in 1986 and was promoted to full professor in 1997.
