= Chawalit Kamutchati =

Thai sports shooter (born 1937)

Personal information
- Born: 6 March 1937 (age 89)

Sport
- Sport: Sports shooting

Chawalit Kamutchati (born 6 March 1937) is a Thai former sports shooter. He competed in the 50 metre rifle, three positions event at the 1972 Summer Olympics.
