= Henry Herscovici =

Israeli sports shooter (1927–2022)

Personal information
- Native name: הנרי הרשקוביץ
- Nationality: Israeli
- Born: 12 February 1927 Bucharest, Romania
- Died: 12 March 2022 (aged 95) Petah Tikva, Israel

Sport
- Sport: Sports shooting
Medal record
Men's shooting
Representing Israel
Maccabiah Games
Bronze medal – third place	1965 Tel Aviv	rifle three positions
Bronze medal – third place	1965 Tel Aviv	rifle prone
Gold medal – first place	1969 Tel Aviv	rifle three positions
Asian Shooting Championships
Gold medal – first place	1967 Tokyo	50 m rifle three positions
Silver medal – second place	1967 Tokyo	rifle 50 m 3x20
Asian Games
Silver medal – second place	1970 Bangkok	10 m air rifle

Henry Herscovici (Hebrew: הנרי הרשקוביץ, also spelled Hershkovitz; 12 February 1927 – 12 March 2022) was an Israeli sports shooter. He competed at the 1968 Summer Olympics and the 1972 Summer Olympics. He also competed at the 1966, 1970, and 1974 Asian Games and the 1965 and 1969 Maccabiah Games.

== Biography ==
Herscovici was born in Bucharest, Romania, on 12 March 1927, into a family of Jewish watchmakers who counted the royal family of Romania among their customers.

He served as an officer in the Romanian Army, where he developed his passion for shooting sports. However, antisemitism in Romania limited his opportunities to compete internationally and in 1965, he emigrated to Israel and began competing for the Israel national shooting sports team.

In 1971, he opened a watch shop in Tel Aviv, where he continued to work into his 90s.

His wife, Sadi Hershkovitz, was an international gymnastics referee who was a judge at the Los Angeles Olympic Games in 1984 and the Seoul Olympic Games in 1988.

Herscovici died in Petah Tikva, Israel on 12 March 2022, at the age of 95. He was survived by two daughters and four grandchildren.

== Career ==
=== Maccabiah Games ===
Herscovici's first international appearance for the Israel national team was at the 1965 Maccabiah Games, where he won the bronze medals in the rifle three positions and prone events. He also participated in the 1969 Maccabiah Games, where he won the gold in the three positions event.

=== Asian competitions ===
At the 1966 Asian Games in Bangkok he achieved fourth place in both the 50 meter rifle three positions and 10 meter air rifle events. At the Asian Shooting Championships in Tokyo in 1967, he won the gold in the 50 meter rifle three positions event, and silver in the 50 meter standard rifle 3x20 shots, while also finishing fifth in the 50 meter prone event. At the 1970 Asian Games, he won the silver medal in the 10 meter air rifle and reached fourth place in the 50 meter three positions competition. His final major international appearance was at the 1974 Asian Games in Tehran, where he achieved fifth place in the prone 50 meter competition.

=== Olympic Games ===
He represented Israel at the 1968 Summer Olympics in Mexico City in the 50 meter rifle shooting events, where he placed 41st and 45th in the three positions and prone 50 meter events, respectively. At the 1972 Summer Olympics in Munich, he placed 46th and 23rd in the three positions and prone 50 meter events, respectively.

Herscovici was also Israel's flag bearer in the opening ceremony at the 1972 Summer Olympics. He survived the Munich massacre by the Palestinian terrorist group Black September, having been warned that the attack was taking place in the Olympic village and hiding, eventually managing to jump from a balcony with other teammates and flee.
