= Nicolae Rotaru =

Romanian sports shooter (b. 1935)

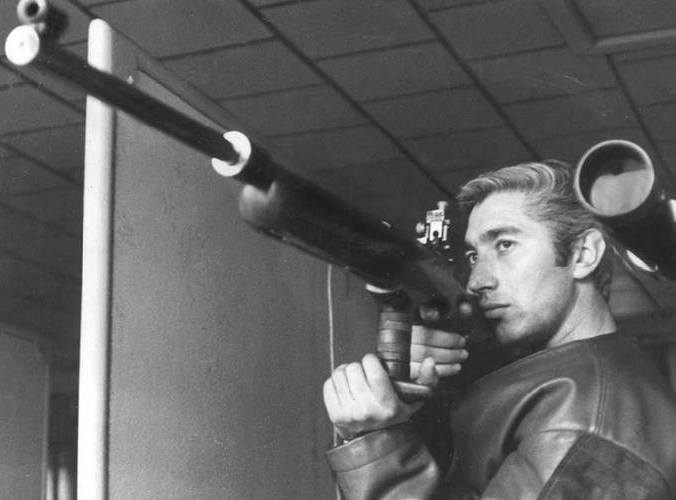

Personal information
- Born: 16 July 1935 Bucharest, Romania
- Height: 175 cm (5 ft 9 in)
- Weight: 66 kg (146 lb)

Sport
- Sport: Sports shooting
- Event: 50 m small-bore rifle
- Club: Metalul Bucharest; Dinamo Bucharest; Steaua Bucharest
Medal record
Representing Romania
Olympic Games
Bronze medal – third place	1972 Munich	50 m rifle prone

Nicolae Rotaru (born 16 July 1935) was a Romanian sport shooter. He competed in small-bore rifle, prone and three positions, at the 1960, 1964, 1968, 1972 and 1976 Olympics and won a bronze medal in 1972 in the prone event. In 1980 he immigrated to the United States.
