= Zelig Shtorch =

Israeli sports shooter

Personal information
- Native name: זליג שטורך
- Nationality: Israeli
- Born: 9 May 1946 (age 80) Karaganda, Soviet Union

Sport
- Sport: Sports shooting

Zelig Shtorch (Hebrew: זליג שטורך; born 9 May 1946) is an Israeli former sports shooter. He competed at the 1968 Summer Olympics and the 1972 Summer Olympics. He also competed at the 1970 and 1974 Asian Games.
