= Udomsak Theinthong =

Thai sports shooter (born 1934)

Personal information
- Born: 23 March 1934 (age 92)

Sport
- Sport: Sports shooting

Udomsak Theinthong (born 23 March 1934) is a Thai former sports shooter. He competed at the 1968, 1972 and the 1984 Summer Olympics. He also competed at the 1970, 1974 and 1978 Asian Games.
