= Minoru Ito (sport shooter) =

Japanese sport shooter (born 1941)

Personal information
- Born: 22 April 1941 (age 85)

Sport
- Sport: Sports shooting

Minoru Ito (伊藤 実, Itō Minoru; born 22 April 1941) is a Japanese former sports shooter. He competed in two events at the 1972 Summer Olympics.
