= Emiliyan Vergov =

Bulgarian sports shooter

Personal information
- Born: 29 August 1942 (age 83) Stara Zagora, Bulgaria

Sport
- Sport: Sports shooting

Emiliyan Vergov (Bulgarian: Емилиян Вергов, born 29 August 1942) is a Bulgarian former sports shooter. He competed at the 1968, 1972 and the 1976 Summer Olympics.
