= Deaths in June 1998 =

The following is a list of notable deaths in June 1998.

Entries for each day are listed alphabetically by surname. A typical entry lists information in the following sequence:

- Name, age, country of citizenship at birth, subsequent country of citizenship (if applicable), reason for notability, cause of death (if known), and reference.

== June 1998 ==
=== 1 ===
- Emery Barnes, 68, American-Canadian gridiron football player and politician.
- Rex Bumgardner, 74, American gridiron football player (Buffalo Bills, Cleveland Browns).
- Patrick Eugene Carr, 75, American district judge (United States District Court for the Eastern District of Louisiana).
- Gottfried Dienst, 78, Swiss football referee.
- Junkyard Dog, 45, American professional wrestler (NWA, WWF), traffic collision.
- Shigeo Fukushima, 55, Japanese Olympic swimmer (1964).
- Godfrey Grayson, 84, English film director.
- Immo Huhtinen, 65, Finnish Olympic sports shooter (1964, 1968, 1972).
- Darwin Joston, 60, American actor (Assault on Precinct 13, Eraserhead, The Fog), leukemia.
- Bishambhar Nath Pande, 91, Indian freedom fighter, social worker, and politician.
- José Pedraza, 60, Mexican race walker and Olympic medalist (1968).
- Jerzy Łoś, 78, Polish mathematician, economist, and philosopher.
- Francisco Rodríguez, 82, Mexican Olympic cyclist (1948).
- Jim Vollenweider, 58, American football player (San Francisco 49ers).

=== 2 ===
- Ian Appleyard, 74, British rally driver and Olympic alpine skier (1948).
- Daniel I. Axelrod, 87, American paleoecologist, heart attack.
- Helen Carter, 70, American country music singer, heart problems.
- P. Andrew Cooray, 96, Sri Lankan politician.
- Oran Henderson, 77, United States Army officer associated with the Mỹ Lai massacre, pancreatic cancer.
- Ricky Hyslop, 83, Canadian violinist, conductor, composer, and arranger.
- Brian Johnston, 64, New Zealand Olympic field hockey player (1956).
- Gonzalo Martínez Ortega, 64, Mexican actor, screenwriter and producer, traffic collision.
- Seija Pöntinen, 64, Finnish Olympic athlete (1952).
- Dorothy Stickney, 101, American actress.

=== 3 ===
- Pat Abbruzzi, 65, American gridiron football player.
- Poul Bundgaard, 75, Danish actor and singer, kidney failure.
- Lucien Conein, 78, French-born U.S. Army officer and OSS/CIA operative, heart failure.
- Jan Erlich, 51, Polish footballer.
- Douglas Gretzler, 47, American serial killer, execution by lethal injection.
- Gil Gunthorpe, 87, Australian cricketer.
- Joseph C. Harsch, 93, American journalist.
- Ernest Henry, 94, Australian freestyle swimmer and Olympic medalist (1924).
- William L. Snyder, 80, American film producer, Alzheimer's disease.

=== 4 ===
- Aarudhra, 72, Indian author, poet, publisher, and playwright.
- Otto Bengtsson, 76, Swedish javelin thrower and Olympian (1952).
- Fred Burchell, 67, Canadian ice hockey player (Montreal Canadiens).
- Clancy Carlile, 68, American novelist and screenwriter, cancer.
- Philippe Charbonneaux, 81, French industrial designer.
- Harry H. Gleaton, 92, American politician.
- Josephine Hutchinson, 94, American actress.
- Ray Montgomery, 76, American actor.
- Miguel Montuori, 65, Italian Argentine football player.
- Eric Plahn, 78, American basketball player.
- Shirley Povich, 92, American sports journalist.
- Sándor Réthy, 74, Hungarian Olympic gymnast (1952).
- H. Allen Smith, 88, American politician, member of the United States House of Representatives (1957-1973).
- David Walsh, 52, Canadian businessman, aneurysm.

=== 5 ===
- Henri Hébrans, 94, Belgian Olympic boxer (1920).
- Alfred Kazin, 83, American writer and literary critic.
- Viola Keats, 87, British actress.
- Emilio Mori, 89, Italian Olympic hurdler (1936).
- Jeanette Nolan, 86, American actress, stroke.
- Raymond Pitman, 65, English cricketer.
- Dieter Roth, 68, Swiss artist, heart attack.
- B. M. Shah, Indian theatre director and playwright.
- Prentiss Walker, 80, American politician, member of the United States House of Representatives (1965-1967).
- Sam Yorty, 88, American politician, stroke.

=== 6 ===
- Georg Bayerer, 83, German football player and coach.
- Louie Bickerton, 95, Australian tennis player.
- Marshall Green, 82, American diplomat.
- Jatoe Kaleo, Ghanaian ruler and politician.
- Dennis McGuire, 59, Australian Olympic canoeist (1964).
- Wally Rivers, 76, South African Olympic cyclist (1948).
- Svend S. Schultz, 84, Danish composer and conductor.
- Eddie Talboom, 77, American college football player (Wyoming Cowboys).
- Peter Wong, 66, Canadian politician, heart attack.

=== 7 ===
- Tom Buskey, 51, American baseball player (New York Yankees, Cleveland Indians, Toronto Blue Jays), complications from heart attack.
- James Byrd Jr., 49, African American lynching victim, dragged.
- Jerry Capehart, 69, American songwriter and music manager.
- David W. Dyer, 87, American circuit judge.
- Wally Gold, 70, American musician and music business executive, colitis.
- Hans Ramberg, 81, Norwegian-Swedish geologist.
- Ralph Vaughn, 80, American basketball player.

=== 8 ===
- Sani Abacha, 54, Nigerian Army officer and dictator, poisoned.
- Dick Furey, 73, American basketball player.
- McCoy Ingram, 67, American basketball player (Minneapolis Lakers).
- Harry Lookofsky, 84, American jazz violinist.
- Jackie McGlew, 69, South African cricket player.
- Michael John O'Brian, 70, Pakistan Air Force officer.
- Maria Reiche, 95, German-Peruvian mathematician and archaeologist, ovarian cancer.
- Larisa Yudina, 52, Soviet and Russian journalist and newspaper editor, homicide.

=== 9 ===
- Agostino Casaroli, 83, Italian Catholic priest and diplomat for the Holy See.
- Bob Cooper, 62, American racing driver.
- Loïs Mailou Jones, 92, American artist and teacher.
- Edmund Koller, 67, West German bobsledder and Olympian (1956).
- Barton Holland Warnock, 86, American botanist, heart attack.

=== 10 ===
- Paudge Brennan, 76, Irish politician.
- Bobby Bryant, 64, American jazz trumpeter and flugelhornist, heart attack.
- Leroy Chollet, 74, American basketball player (Syracuse Nationals).
- David English, 67, British journalist and newspaper editor.
- Fernando Germani, 92, Italian organist of the St. Peter's Basilica in Rome.
- Steve Griffiths, 84, English footballer.
- Jim Hearn, 77, American baseball player (St. Louis Cardinals, New York Giants, Philadelphia Phillies).
- Hammond Innes, 84, English author.
- Nivedita Jain, 19, Indian beauty contestant and actress, complications after fall.
- Raul Klein, 65, Brazilian footballer.
- Steve Sanders, 45, American musician, singer and songwriter, suicide by gunshot.
- John G. Smith, 73, American baseball coach, pneumonia.

=== 11 ===
- Thomas Abernethy, 95, American politician, member of the United States House of Representatives (1943-1973).
- Harry Anderson, 66, American baseball player (Philadelphia Phillies, Cincinnati Reds).
- Cléo, 60, Brazilian footballer.
- Dame Catherine Cookson, 91, British author.
- Gevorg Emin, 78, Armenian poet, essayist, and translator.
- Jacques Emmanuel, 78, French actor, screenwriter and librettist.
- Alexei Eriomin, 79, Soviet and Russian realist painter.
- Alfons Jēgers, 78, Latvian sportsman.
- Don Menasco, 68, American football player (New York Giants, Washington Redskins).
- Jože Privšek, 61, Slovene jazz and pop musician.
- Leopoldo Salcedo, 86, Filipino film actor.
- Lucia Valentini Terrani, 51, Italian coloratura mezzo-soprano, leukemia.

=== 12 ===
- Leo Buscaglia, 74, American author and motivational speaker, heart attack.
- Walter De Giusti, 35–36, Argentine spree killer, HIV/AIDS complications.
- John Gutmann, 93, German-American photographer and painter.
- Charles "Teenie" Harris, 90, American photographer.
- Jon Leirfall, 98, Norwegian politician.
- Theresa Merritt, 75, American actress (That's My Mama, The Wiz, Billy Madison) and singer, skin cancer.
- Paul Michael Stephani, 53, American serial killer, skin cancer.
- Richard Thompson, 83, American animator.
- Lucienne Velu, 96, French athlete, basketball player and Olympian (1928, 1936).

=== 13 ===
- Nisim Aloni, 71, Israeli playwright and translator.
- Lucio Costa, 96, Brazilian architect and urban planner.
- Gil Duthie, 86, Australian politician.
- Buddy Elrod, 79, American football player.
- Alfred Horace Gerrard, 99, English modernist sculptor.
- Birger Ruud, 86, Norwegian ski jumper and Olympian (1932, 1936, 1948).
- Fernand Sastre, 74, French football official, cancer.
- Kadamba Simmons, 24, British actress and model, strangled.
- Henryka Słomczewska-Nowak, 83, Polish Olympic long jumper (1948).
- Reg Smythe, 80, British cartoonist (Andy Capp), lung cancer.
- Yoshio Sugino, 93, Japanese martial artist and film choreographer.
- Éric Tabarly, 86, French naval officer and yachtsman, drowned.
- Henry Tatana, 53, New Zealand rugby player.

=== 14 ===
- Camillo Achilli, 76, Italian footballer.
- Hans W. Brimi, 80, Norwegian farmer and traditional folk musician.
- Ginette Mathiot, 91, French food writer.
- Oliver Treyz, 80, American network television executive.

=== 15 ===
- Humphrey Boardman, 93, English rower and Olympian (1928).
- Hartmut Boockmann, 63, German historian.
- Suzanne Eisendieck, 91, German painter.
- Jason Holliday, 74, American hustler and nightclub performer.
- Morris Kestelman, 92, British artist.
- Thierry Salmon, 41, Belgian actor and theatre director, traffic collision.
- Casey Walker, 85, American baseball player.
- Anton van Wilderode, 79, Belgian priest, writer and poet.

=== 16 ===
- Roberto Cañedo, 80, Mexican actor.
- Lewis Leonard Forman, 68, British botanist.
- Jorge Toriello Garrido, 90, Guatemalan politician and President of Guatemala.
- Frank Kristufek, 82, American football player (Brooklyn Dodgers).
- Keith Newton, 56, English footballer, laryngeal cancer.
- Ricardo Núñez, 93, Spanish actor, screenwriter, producer and film director.
- Jafar Sharif-Emami, 85, Iranian politician.
- Stylianos Stratakos, 83, Greek Olympic sprinter (1948).
- Robert Van Grootenbruele, 91, Belgian cyclist.
- Fred Wacker, 79, American businessman and racecar driver.

=== 17 ===
- John Carberry, 93, American Roman Catholic prelate.
- Dina de Marco, 60, Mexican actress and television director, cancer.
- Aage Eriksen, 81, Norwegian Greco-Roman wrestler and Olympic medalist (1948, 1952).
- Leif Freij, 55, Swedish wrestler and Olympian (1960).
- Joe Kelly, 91, Australian rules football player and coach.
- Carlos Loredo, 46, Cuban football player and Olympian (1976, 1980).
- Gianni Lunadei, 60, Italian-Argentine actor, suicide by gunshot.
- Gyula László, 88, Hungarian historian, archaeologist and artist.
- Mohammad Sabir, 54, Pakistani cricketer.
- Muhammad Metwalli al-Sha'rawi, 87, Egyptian Muslim jurist.

=== 18 ===
- Otto Baum, 86, German commander of the Waffen-SS during World War II.
- André Chorda, 60, French football player.
- Henry C. Cooper, 84, Australian Olympic boxer (1936).
- Archie Edwards, 79, American blues guitarist.
- Edward Eliscu, 96, American lyricist, playwright, producer and actor.
- Hugh Gibson, 79, American district judge (United States District Court for the Southern District of Texas).
- Ernesto Grillo, 68, Argentine footballer, pancreatic cancer.
- Kim Jin-kyu, 76, South Korean actor, film director and producer, cancer.
- Felix Knight, 89, American tenor, actor, and vocal teacher.
- Charles Korvin, 90, Hungarian-born American actor, photographer and master chef.
- Adel Osseiran, 93, Lebanese statesman and founding father of the Lebanese Republic.
- Nazim Panipati, Pakistani film song lyricist and film script writer.
- Karl-Heinz Spikofski, 71, German football player and coach.
- Herbert J. Sweet, 78, United States Marine Sergeant Major, respiratory failure.
- Paul van Buren, 74, American theologian and author, cancer.

=== 19 ===
- John Camkin, 75, English journalist and sports commentator, cancer.
- Novice Gail Fawcett, 89, American academic administrator.
- Anatoly Kasheida, 69, Soviet and Ukrainian writer, poet, and journalist.
- Howard J. Whitmore, Jr., 93, American politician.

=== 20 ===
- Bruno Barnabe, 93, English film and stage actor.
- Ernst Brugger, 84, Swiss politician .
- Robert James Clayton, 82, English electronics engineer.
- Heinz Ditgens, 83, German football player, manager and Olympian (1936).
- Per Anders Fogelström, 80, Swedish writer.
- Bobby Gimby, 79, Canadian orchestra leader, trumpeter, and singer-songwriter.
- Kali, 79, Polish-American painter.
- Elio Ragni, 87, Italian Olympic sprinter (1936).
- Conrad Schumann, 56, East German border guard, suicide by hanging.
- George Van Peursem, American politician.

=== 21 ===
- Harry Cranbrook Allen, 81, British historian of the United States.
- Anastasio Ballestrero, 84, Italian Roman Catholic cardinal.
- Al Campanis, 81, American baseball executive, coronary artery disease.
- Emma Danieli, 61, Italian actress and television personality.
- Gerhard Gundermann, 43, German singer-songwriter and rock musician, stroke.
- François Lehideux, 94, French industrialist and member of the Vichy government.
- Peter Mander, 69, New Zealand yachtsman and Olympic gold medal winner (1956, 1964).
- Elio Morille, 70, Italian rower and Olympic champion (1948, 1952).
- Tom Smith, 88, Scottish football player and manager.

=== 22 ===
- Phil Campbell, 81, American farmer and politician.
- Brian Davis, 63, New Zealand Anglican archbishop.
- Juliusz Bogdan Deczkowski, 74, Polish soldier during World War II, and later inventor and writer.
- Benny Green, 70, British writer, radio broadcaster and saxophonist, cancer.
- Norberto Doroteo Méndez, 75, Argentine football player.

=== 23 ===
- Leonard Jones, 74, Canadian lawyer and politician.
- Kurt Kren, 68, Austrian avant-garde filmmaker.
- Ida Krottendorf, 71, Austrian actress, cancer.
- Bill Lee, 86, American gridiron football player (Brooklyn Dodgers, Green Bay Packers).
- Paul O'Dwyer, 90, Irish-American politician and lawyer.
- Maureen O'Sullivan, 87, American actress, heart attack.

=== 24 ===
- Francine Agazarian, 85, French spy during World War II.
- Canito, 67, Spanish footballer.
- Henri Colans, 82, Belgian Olympic weightlifter (1948, 1952).
- Beatrice Mandelman, 85, American abstract artist, cancer.
- Henry G. Saperstein, 80, American film producer and distributor.

=== 25 ===
- David Ayalon, 84, Israeli historian of Islam and the Middle East.
- Hans Friedrich, 81, German politician and member of the Bundestag.
- Arthur Lewis, 81, British politician.
- Lounès Matoub, 42, Algerian Berber singer, poet and political activist, assassinated.
- Jirō Takamatsu, 62, Japanese artist.

=== 26 ===
- Pierre Angénieux, 90, French engineer and optician.
- Frank Arkell, 62, Australian politician, homicide.
- Alioune Blondin Béye, 59, Malian politician, minister of foreign affairs (1978-1986), plane crash.
- John Malcolm Brinnin, 81, Canadian-American poet and literary critic.
- Bobby Cairns, 69, Scottish football player.
- Sero Khanzadyan, 82, Armenian writer.
- Vladimir Petukhov, 48, Russian mayor of Nefteyugansk, killed.
- Luciano Pezzi, 77, Italian road bicycle racer.
- Derek Rayner, Baron Rayner, 72, English businessman and life peer.
- Hacı Sabancı, 63, Turkish businessman and philanthropist, lung cancer.
- Dick Schulz, 81, American basketball player.
- William R. Sears, 70, American politician.

=== 27 ===
- Pierre Boutang, 81, French philosopher, poet and translator.
- David Laitt, 67, English cricketer.
- Sumati Morarjee, 91, Indian businessman.
- Gilles Rocheleau, 62, Canadian politician.
- Homi J.H. Taleyarkhan, 86, Indian politician and Gandhian.
- Joyce Wieland, 67, Canadian experimental visual artist, Alzheimer's disease.
- Peter H. Wyden, 74, American journalist and writer.

=== 28 ===
- Jonathan Benair, 47, American actor (The Brave Little Toaster), cerebral hemorrhage and heart attack.
- Marion Eugene Carl, 82, American flying ace during World War II and record-setting test pilot, shot during robbery.
- Juan Cortés, 60, Chilean footballer.
- Bill Elias, 75, American football coach.
- Božidar Ferjančić, 69, Serbian historian.
- Louis Hostin, 90, French weightlifter and Olympic champion (1928, 1932, 1936).
- Glenn Montgomery, 31, American gridiron football player (Houston Oilers, Seattle Seahawks), ALS.
- Franny Murray, 82, American football player (Philadelphia Eagles).
- Åke Olivestedt, 74, Swedish Olympic cyclist (1948).
- Brita Collett Paus, 80, Norwegian humanitarian leader.
- Jean-Yves Raimbaud, 40, French animator and cartoonist, lung cancer.
- Jack Rowley, 79, English footballer.
- Birger Sandberg, 80, Swedish football player and manager.
- Kamala Sohonie, 85, Indian biochemist.
- Denis Williams, 75, Guyanese painter, author and archaeologist.

=== 29 ===
- Slavko Dokmanović, 48, Croatian Serbian war criminal, suicide by hanging.
- Joseph G. Galway, 75, American meteorologist.
- Jess Hahn, 76, American-French actor.
- Horst Jankowski, 62, German classical pianist, lung cancer.
- Küllo Kõiv, 25, Estonian Olympic wrestler (1992, 1996), traffic collision.
- Kamalakara Kameshwara Rao, 86, Indian film director, cardiac arrest.
- Frank Rowlett, 90, American cryptologist.

=== 30 ===
- Galina Brezhneva, 69, Soviet and Russian socialite and daughter of General Secretary Leonid Brezhnev, cerebrovascular disease.
- Renato Capecchi, 74, Italian baritone, actor, and opera director.
- Giorgio Carpi, 89, Italian football player.
- George Parsons, 84, Canadian ice hockey player (Toronto Maple Leafs).
- John Peter, 61, Indian field hockey player and Olympian (1960, 1964, 1968).
- Bob Pryde, 85, Scottish football player.
