= Weightlifting at the 1948 Summer Olympics – Men's 60 kg =

Men's 60 kg at the Games of the XIV Olympiad
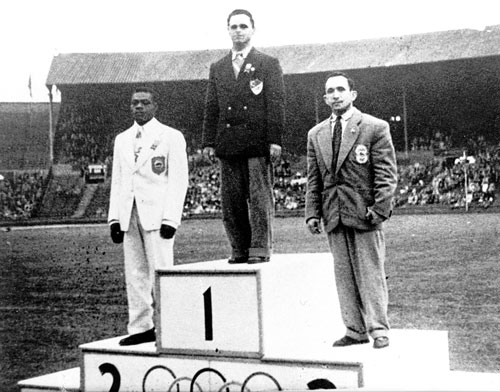
- The final podium. From left to right, Wilkes, Fayad and Salmasi.
- Venue: Empress Hall (Earls Court Exhibition Centre)
- Date: 9 August 1948
- Competitors: 23 from 18 nations
- Winning total: 332.5 kg WR

Medalists
1st place, gold medalist(s)		Mahmoud Fayad	Egypt
2nd place, silver medalist(s)		Rodney Wilkes	Trinidad and Tobago
3rd place, bronze medalist(s)		Jafar Salmasi	Iran

The men's 60 kg weightlifting competitions at the 1948 Summer Olympics in London took place on 9 August at the Empress Hall of the Earls Court Exhibition Centre. The featherweight class, which had been the lightest from their introduction in the 1920 Summer Olympics until the 1936 Summer Olympics, was now the second-lightest, with a bantamweight (56 kg) class split off into a separate competition.

Each weightlifter had three attempts at each of the three lifts. The best score for each lift was summed to give a total. The weightlifter could increase the weight between attempts (minimum of 5 kg between first and second attempts, 2.5 kg between second and third attempts) but could not decrease weight. If two or more weightlifters finished with the same total, the competitors' body weights were used as the tie-breaker (lighter athlete wins).

== Records ==
Prior to this competition, the existing world and Olympic records were as follows.

World record	Press	Juitsu Nan (JPN)	105 kg		1939
World record	Snatch	Juitsu Nan (JPN)	102.5 kg		1939
World record	Clean & Jerk	Mahmoud Fayad (EGY)	131 kg		1946
World record	Total	Arvid Andersson (SWE)	300 kg	Paris, France	18–19 October 1946
Olympic record	Press	Hans Wölpert (GER)	92.5 kg	Amsterdam, Netherlands	28 July 1928
Olympic record	Press	Giuseppe Conca (ITA)	92.5 kg	Amsterdam, Netherlands	28 July 1928
Olympic record	Snatch	Franz Andrysek (AUT)	90 kg	Amsterdam, Netherlands	28 July 1928
Olympic record	Snatch	Pierino Gabetti (ITA)	90 kg	Amsterdam, Netherlands	28 July 1928
Olympic record	Clean & Jerk	Franz Andrysek (AUT)	120 kg	Amsterdam, Netherlands	28 July 1928
Olympic record	Total	Franz Andrysek (AUT)	287.5 kg	Amsterdam, Netherlands	28 July 1928

== Results ==
Rank	Athlete	Nation	Body weight	Press (kg)				Snatch (kg)				Clean & Jerk (kg)				Total
Rank	Athlete	Nation	Body weight	1	2	3	Result	1	2	3	Result	1	2	3	Result	Total
1st place, gold medalist(s)	Mahmoud Fayad	Egypt	59.71	85	90	92.5	92.5	97.5	102.5	105	105 WR	130	~~135~~	135	135 WR	332.5 WR
2nd place, silver medalist(s)	Rodney Wilkes	Trinidad and Tobago	60.00	90	97.5	~~100~~	97.5	90	95	97.5	97.5	115	122.5	~~127.5~~	122.5	317.5
3rd place, bronze medalist(s)	Jafar Salmasi	Iran	59.99	95	100	~~102.5~~	100 WR	90	95	97.5	97.5	115	~~120~~	~~120~~	115	312.5
4	Nam Su-il	South Korea	59.80	~~90~~	90	92.5	92.5	~~87.5~~	92.5	~~95~~	92.5	~~117.5~~	117.5	122.5	122.5	307.5
5	Rodrigo del Rosario	Philippines	59.92	97.5	~~105~~	~~105~~	97.5	87.5	~~92.5~~	92.5	92.5	117.5	~~125~~	~~125~~	117.5	307.5
6	Emerick Ishikawa	United States	60.00	87.5	~~92.5~~	92.5	92.5	90	95	~~97.5~~	95	120	~~127.5~~	~~127.5~~	120	307.5
7	Johan Runge	Denmark	60.00	90	95	~~97.5~~	95	90	~~95~~	~~95~~	90	115	~~120~~	120	120	305
8	Max Heral	France	59.68	80	85	~~87.5~~	85	90	~~95~~	95	95	115	120	~~125~~	120	300
9	Richard Tomita	United States	59.85	85	~~90~~	~~90~~	85	87.5	92.5	~~95~~	92.5	117.5	122.5	~~125~~	122.5	300
10	André Le Guillerm	France	59.86	80	85	87.5	87.5	85	90	92.5	92.5	115	~~120~~	120	120	300
11	Anton Richter	Austria	59.65	75	80	~~82.5~~	80	87.5	92.5	~~95~~	92.5	112.5	~~120~~	120	120	292.5
12	Ibrahim El-Dessouki	Egypt	59.74	80	85	87.5	87.5	82.5	87.5	90	90	~~115~~	~~115~~	115	115	292.5
13	Arvid Andersson	Sweden	59.77	85	~~90~~	–	85	~~92.5~~	~~92.5~~	92.5	92.5	~~115~~	115	–	115	292.5
14	Denis Hallett	Great Britain	59.90	82.5	~~87.5~~	87.5	87.5	82.5	~~87.5~~	87.5	87.5	110	115	117.5	117.5	292.5
15	Bálint Nagy	Hungary	59.50	82.5	~~87.5~~	~~87.5~~	82.5	~~90~~	90	~~95~~	90	110	115	117.5	117.5	290
16	Daniel Pon Mony	India	58.45	85	~~90~~	~~90~~	85	80	85	~~87.5~~	85	110	~~115~~	–	110	280
17	Simon Williams	Jamaica	59.75	82.5	87.5	~~90~~	87.5	~~80~~	~~80~~	80	80	105	~~110~~	110	110	277.5
18	Alphonso Correia	Guyana	59.46	75	~~80~~	~~80~~	75	~~85~~	85	~~95~~	85	~~115~~	115	~~125~~	115	275
19	Henri Colans	Belgium	59.60	75	~~80~~	~~80~~	75	85	~~90~~	~~90~~	85	110	115	~~120~~	115	275
20	Sidney Kemble	Great Britain	59.50	~~87.5~~	87.5	~~92.5~~	87.5	80	~~85~~	~~85~~	80	105	~~110~~	~~110~~	105	272.5
21	Alfonso Fiorentino	Argentina	59.45	70	75	~~80~~	75	75	80	~~85~~	80	100	105	~~110~~	105	260
22	Richard Rieder	Switzerland	59.90	75	80	~~82.5~~	80	75	~~80~~	~~82.5~~	75	95	100	~~105~~	100	255
23	Choi Hang-gi	South Korea	59.45	~~95~~	~~95~~	~~95~~	0	85	~~90~~	~~90~~	85	–	–	–	–	85

== New records ==
Press	100 kg	Jafar Salmasi (IRI)	OR, WR
Snatch	105 kg	Mahmoud Fayad (EGY)	OR, WR
Clean & Jerk	135 kg	Mahmoud Namdjou (EGY)	OR, WR
Total	332.5 kg	Mahmoud Namdjou (EGY)	OR, WR
