= Weightlifting at the 1952 Summer Olympics – Men's 60 kg =

Men's 60 kg at the Games of the XV Olympiad
- Venue: Messuhalli
- Date: 25 July 1952
- Competitors: 22 from 21 nations
- Winning total: 337.5 kg WR

Medalists
1st place, gold medalist(s)		Rafael Chimishkyan	Soviet Union
2nd place, silver medalist(s)		Nikolai Saksonov	Soviet Union
3rd place, bronze medalist(s)		Rodney Wilkes	Trinidad and Tobago

The men's 60 kg weightlifting competitions at the 1952 Summer Olympics in Helsinki took place on 25 July at Messuhalli. It was the seventh appearance of the featherweight class, and the second time the weight class featured weightlifters between 56 and 60 kg (prior appearances had featherweight as the lightest weight class before a 56 kg weight class was added in 1948).

Each weightlifter had three attempts at each of the three lifts. The best score for each lift was summed to give a total. The weightlifter could increase the weight between attempts (minimum of 5 kg between first and second attempts, 2.5 kg between second and third attempts) but could not decrease weight. If two or more weightlifters finished with the same total, the competitors' body weights were used as the tie-breaker (lighter athlete wins).

== Records ==
Prior to this competition, the existing world and Olympic records were as follows.

World record	Press	Juitsu Nan (JPN)	105 kg		1939
World record	Snatch	Nikolai Saksonov (URS)	106 kg		1951
World record	Clean & Jerk	Nikolai Saksonov (URS)	138 kg		1951
World record	Total	Mahmoud Fayad (EGY)	332.5 kg	London, United Kingdom	9 August 1948
Olympic record	Press	Jafar Salmasi (IRI)	100 kg	London, United Kingdom	9 August 1948
Olympic record	Snatch	Mahmoud Fayad (EGY)	105 kg	London, United Kingdom	9 August 1948
Olympic record	Clean & Jerk	Mahmoud Fayad (EGY)	135 kg	London, United Kingdom	9 August 1948
Olympic record	Total	Mahmoud Fayad (EGY)	332.5 kg	London, United Kingdom	9 August 1948

== Results ==
Rank	Athlete	Nation	Body weight	Press (kg)				Snatch (kg)				Clean & Jerk (kg)				Total
Rank	Athlete	Nation	Body weight	1	2	3	Result	1	2	3	Result	1	2	3	Result	Total
1st place, gold medalist(s)	Rafael Chimishkyan	Soviet Union	59.65	90	95	97.5	97.5	97.5	102.5	105	105 =OR	130	~~135~~	135	135 =OR	337.5 WR
2nd place, silver medalist(s)	Nikolay Saksonov	Soviet Union	59.95	90	~~95~~	95	95	100	~~105~~	105	105 =OR	132.5	~~140~~	~~140~~	132.5	332.5
3rd place, bronze medalist(s)	Rodney Wilkes	Trinidad and Tobago	59.30	90	95	100	100	90	97.5	100	100	~~122.5~~	122.5	~~132.5~~	122.5	322.5
4	Rodrigo del Rosario	Philippines	59.20	100	105	~~107.5~~	105 OR	87.5	~~92.5~~	92.5	92.5	120	~~125~~	~~125~~	120	317.5
5	Khalifa Said Gouda	Egypt	59.20	85	~~90~~	~~90~~	85	95	100	102.5	102.5	120	125	~~130~~	125	312.5
6	Chay Weng Yew	Singapore	59.80	82.5	~~87.5~~	87.5	87.5	92.5	97.5	~~100~~	97.5	~~127.5~~	127.5	~~132.5~~	127.5	312.5
7	Bálint Nagy	Hungary	59.60	85	~~90~~	~~90~~	85	~~90~~	90	97.5	97.5	120	125	~~127.5~~	125	307.5
8	Mohssain Tabatabaie	Iran	59.85	90	~~95~~	~~95~~	90	90	95	97.5	97.5	~~115~~	115	120	120	307.5
9	Julian Creus	Great Britain	59.65	82.5	87.5	~~90~~	87.5	90	95	~~97.5~~	95	117.5	~~122.5~~	122.5	122.5	305
10	Jules Sylvain	Canada	59.85	87.5	92.5	~~95~~	92.5	87.5	~~92.5~~	92.5	92.5	112.5	117.5	~~122.5~~	117.5	302.5
11	Nam Su-il	South Korea	59.95	~~90~~	~~90~~	90	90	~~85~~	85	90	90	115	120	~~122.5~~	120	300
12	Daniel Pon Mony	India	60.00	85	90	95	95	85	90	~~92.5~~	90	115	~~120~~	—	115	300
13	Max Heral	France	59.35	77.5	82.5	~~85~~	82.5	87.5	92.5	95	95	115	120	~~125~~	120	297.5
14	Nil Tun Maung	Burma	59.05	~~90~~	90	~~95~~	90	82.5	87.5	~~90~~	87.5	117.5	~~122.5~~	~~122.5~~	117.5	295
15	Mikko Hokka	Finland	60.00	80	85	~~87.5~~	85	90	95	~~97.5~~	95	105	110	115	115	295
16	Oswald Junkes	Germany	59.85	75	80	~~82.5~~	80	85	90	~~92.5~~	90	110	115	120	120	290
17	Einar Eriksson	Sweden	59.95	82.5	~~87.5~~	87.5	87.5	87.5	~~92.5~~	92.5	92.5	110	~~115~~	~~115~~	110	290
18	James van Rensburg	South Africa	59.65	87.5	~~92.5~~	~~92.5~~	87.5	87.5	~~92.5~~	~~92.5~~	87.5	110	~~115~~	~~115~~	110	285
19	Giovanni Cocco	Italy	59.75	85	~~90~~	90	90	82.5	~~87.5~~	~~87.5~~	82.5	~~110~~	110	~~115~~	110	282.5
20	Henri Colans	Belgium	59.60	80	~~85~~	~~85~~	80	85	~~90~~	~~90~~	85	~~115~~	115	~~120~~	115	280
21	Henryk Skowronek	Poland	59.75	72.5	77.5	~~80~~	77.5	85	~~92.5~~	~~92.5~~	85	~~107.5~~	107.5	110	110	272.5
22	Carlos Chávez	Panama	58.20	90	~~95~~	~~95~~	90	~~92.5~~	~~92.5~~	—	—	—	—	—	—	90

== New records ==
Press	105 kg	Rodrigo Del Rosario (PHI)	OR
Snatch	105 kg	Rafael Chimishkyan (URS); Nikolay Saksonov (URS)	=OR
Clean & Jerk	135 kg	Rafael Chimishkyan (URS)	=OR
Total	337.5 kg	Rafael Chimishkyan (URS)	WR
