= Weightlifting at the 1956 Summer Olympics – Men's 60 kg =

Weightlifting at the Olympics

Men's 60 kg at the Games of the XVI Olympiad
- Venue: Royal Exhibition Building
- Date: 23 November 1956
- Competitors: 21 from 19 nations
- Winning total: 352.5 kg WR

Medalists
1st place, gold medalist(s)		Isaac Berger	United States
2nd place, silver medalist(s)		Yevgeny Minayev	Soviet Union
3rd place, bronze medalist(s)		Marian Zieliński	Poland

The men's 60 kg weightlifting competitions at the 1956 Summer Olympics in Melbourne took place on 23 November at the Royal Exhibition Building. It was the eighth appearance of the featherweight class, and the third time the weight class featured weightlifters between 56 and 60 kg (prior appearances had featherweight as the lightest weight class before a 56 kg weight class was added in 1948).

Each weightlifter had three attempts at each of the three lifts. The best score for each lift was summed to give a total. The weightlifter could increase the weight between attempts (minimum of 5 kg between first and second attempts, 2.5 kg between second and third attempts) but could not decrease weight. If two or more weightlifters finished with the same total, the competitors' body weights were used as the tie-breaker (lighter athlete wins).

== Records ==
Prior to this competition, the existing world and Olympic records were as follows.

World record	Press	Yevgeny Minayev (URS)	114 kg		1956
World record	Snatch	Rafael Chimishkyan (URS)	110 kg	Munich, West Germany	12 October 1955
World record	Clean & Jerk	Rafael Chimishkyan (URS)	143 kg	Vienna, Austria	7 October 1954
World record	Total	Rafael Chimishkyan (URS); Ivan Udodov (URS)	350 kg	Vienna, Austria	7 October 1954
Olympic record	Press	Rodrigo Del Rosario (PHI)	105 kg	Helsinki, Finland	25 July 1952
Olympic record	Snatch	Mahmoud Fayad (EGY); Rafael Chimishkyan (URS); Nikolay Saksonov (URS)	105 kg	London, United Kingdom; Helsinki, Finland; Helsinki, Finland	9 August 1948; 25 July 1952; 25 July 1952
Olympic record	Clean & Jerk	Mahmoud Fayad (EGY); Rafael Chimishkyan (URS)	135 kg	London, United Kingdom; Helsinki, Finland	9 August 1948; 25 July 1952
Olympic record	Total	Rafael Chimishkyan (URS)	337.5 kg	Helsinki, Finland	25 July 1952

== Results ==
Rank	Athlete	Nation	Body weight	Press (kg)				Snatch (kg)				Clean & Jerk (kg)				Total
Rank	Athlete	Nation	Body weight	1	2	3	Result	1	2	3	Result	1	2	3	Result	Total
1st place, gold medalist(s)	Isaac Berger	United States	59.30	102.5	~~107.5~~	107.5	107.5	100	105	107.5	107.5 OR	132.5	~~137.5~~	137.5	137.5 OR	352.5 WR
2nd place, silver medalist(s)	Yevgeny Minayev	Soviet Union	59.80	107.5	112.5	115	115 WR	100	~~105~~	~~105~~	100	127.5	~~132.5~~	~~135~~	127.5	342.5
3rd place, bronze medalist(s)	Marian Zieliński	Poland	59.90	~~100~~	100	105	105	97.5	102.5	~~105~~	102.5	127.5	~~132.5~~	~~132.5~~	127.5	335
4	Rodney Wilkes	Trinidad and Tobago	60.00	95	100	~~102.5~~	100	95	100	105	105	125	~~132.5~~	~~135~~	125	330
5	Hiroyoshi Shiratori	Japan	59.80	97.5	~~102.5~~	~~102.5~~	97.5	95	100	~~102.5~~	100	122.5	~~127.5~~	127.5	127.5	325
6	Georg Miske	United Team of Germany	59.90	95	100	~~102.5~~	100	90	95	~~97.5~~	95	120	~~125~~	125	125	320
7	Tan Ser Cher	Singapore	59.10	87.5	92.5	~~95~~	92.5	85	90	92.5	92.5	125	~~130~~	130	130	315
8	Lee Gyeong-seop	South Korea	59.90	90	~~95~~	~~95~~	90	~~95~~	95	~~102.5~~	95	117.5	127.5	~~132.5~~	127.5	312.5
9	Jules Sylvain	Canada	59.70	92.5	~~97.5~~	~~97.5~~	92.5	90	~~95~~	95	95	115	~~122.5~~	122.5	122.5	310
10	Takahiro Yamaguchi	Japan	60.00	87.5	92.5	~~95~~	92.5	92.5	~~97.5~~	~~97.5~~	92.5	125	~~130~~	~~130~~	125	310
11	Julian Creus	Great Britain	60.00	85	90	~~92.5~~	90	95	~~100~~	~~100~~	95	117.5	~~122.5~~	122.5	122.5	307.5
11	Maurice Megennis	Great Britain	60.00	87.5	92.5	~~95~~	92.5	87.5	92.5	~~95~~	92.5	117.5	122.5	~~127.5~~	122.5	307.5
13	Hussain Zarrini	Iran	60.00	92.5	~~97.5~~	~~97.5~~	92.5	92.5	~~97.5~~	~~97.5~~	92.5	115	120	~~125~~	120	305
14	Tun Maung Kywe	Burma	58.20	85	90	~~92.5~~	90	85	90	92.5	92.5	~~115~~	~~115~~	115	115	297.5
15	Liem Kim Leng	Indonesia	59.00	87.5	~~92.5~~	~~92.5~~	87.5	92.5	~~97.5~~	~~97.5~~	92.5	~~112.5~~	~~112.5~~	112.5	112.5	292.5
16	Keith Caple	Australia	59.60	82.5	87.5	~~92.5~~	87.5	82.5	87.5	90	90	110	~~115~~	~~115~~	110	287.5
17	Koh Eng Tong	Malaya	59.60	82.5	87.5	90	90	~~82.5~~	82.5	~~87.5~~	82.5	107.5	112.5	~~117.5~~	112.5	285
18	Muhammad Bashir	Pakistan	59.60	72.5	~~77.5~~	~~77.5~~	72.5	~~72.5~~	72.5	77.5	77.5	97.5	~~102.5~~	~~102.5~~	97.5	247.5
19	Sebastiano Mannironi	Italy	59.30	95	~~100~~	100	100	100	~~105~~	–	100	Retired				200
20	Rodrigo del Rosario	Philippines	59.80	102.5	~~107.5~~	~~107.5~~	102.5	~~87.5~~	~~87.5~~	87.5	87.5	~~117.5~~	~~117.5~~	~~117.5~~	–	190
21	Lim Jose-ning	Republic of China	59.60	87.5	~~95~~	~~95~~	87.5	~~87.5~~	~~92.5~~	~~92.5~~	–	Retired				87.5

== New records ==
Press	115 kg	Yevgeny Minayev (URS)	WR
Snatch	107.5 kg	Isaac Berger (USA)	OR
Clean & Jerk	137.5 kg	Isaac Berger (USA)	OR
Total	352.5 kg	Isaac Berger (USA)	WR
