= 2016–17 Belgian First Division A =

114th season of top-tier football in Belgium

Belgian First Division A
- Season: 2016–17
- Dates: 29 July 2016 – 31 May 2017
- Champions: Anderlecht
- Relegated: Westerlo
- Champions League: Anderlecht; Club Brugge
- Europa League: Zulte Waregem; Gent; Oostende
- Matches: 191
- Goals: 525 (2.75 per match)
- Top goalscorer: Łukasz Teodorczyk (22 goals)
- All statistics correct as of 29 January 2017.

The 2016–17 season of the Belgian First Division A was the 114th season of top-tier football in Belgium and the first following the structural changes in the Belgian football pyramid, reducing the number of professional teams to 24. It began on 29 July 2016 and finished on 31 May 2017. The fixtures were announced on 8 June 2016. Club Brugge were the defending champions but had to settle for second place with Anderlecht taking their 34th title.

== Team changes ==
- OH Leuven was relegated after finishing last in the 2015–16 Belgian Pro League.
- Due to the fact that 2015–16 Belgian Second Division champions WS Brussels were refused a Belgian professional football license, Eupen was promoted as runner-up instead.

== Teams ==
=== Stadiums and locations ===
Location of the 2016–17 Belgian First Division A teams

Matricule	Club	Location	Venue	Capacity
35	Anderlecht	Anderlecht	Constant Vanden Stock Stadium	21,000
22	Charleroi	Charleroi	Stade du Pays de Charleroi	14,000
3	Club Brugge	Bruges	Jan Breydel Stadium	29,042
4276	Eupen	Eupen	Kehrweg Stadion	8,363
322	Genk	Genk	Cristal Arena	24,956
7	Gent	Ghent	Ghelamco Arena	19,999
19	Kortrijk	Kortrijk	Guldensporen Stadion	9,399
282	Lokeren	Lokeren	Daknamstadion	9,560
25	Mechelen	Mechelen	AFAS-stadion Achter de Kazerne	13,213
216	Excel Mouscron	Mouscron	Stade Le Canonnier	10,571
31	Oostende	Ostend	Versluys Arena	8,432
373	Sint-Truiden	Sint-Truiden	Stayen	14,600
16	Standard Liège	Liège	Stade Maurice Dufrasne	28,278
4068	Waasland-Beveren	Beveren	Freethiel Stadion	8,190
2024	Westerlo	Westerlo	Het Kuipje	8,035
5381	Zulte Waregem	Waregem	Regenboogstadion	9,540

=== Personnel and kits ===
Club	Manager	Captain	Kit Manufacturer	Sponsors
Anderlecht	(Switzerland) René Weiler	(Algeria) Sofiane Hanni	Adidas	BNP Paribas Fortis
Charleroi	(Belgium) Felice Mazzu	(Spain) Francisco Martos	Hungaria	Proximus
Club Brugge	(Belgium) Michel Preud'homme	(Belgium) Timmy Simons	Nike	Daikin
Eupen	(Spain) Jordi Condom Aulí	(Spain) Luis García Fernández	BURRDA	Aspire Academy
Excel Mouscron	(Romania) Mircea Rednic	(Belgium) David Hubert	Patrick	Star Casino
Genk	(Netherlands) Albert Stuivenberg	(Belgium) Thomas Buffel	Nike	Beobank
Gent	(Belgium) Hein Vanhaezebrouck	(Bosnia and Herzegovina) Danijel Milićević	Jartazi	VDK Spaarbank
Kortrijk	(Belgium) Bart Van Lancker	(Serbia) Nebojša Pavlović	Jako	AGO Jobs & HR
Lokeren	(Iceland) Rúnar Kristinsson	(Belgium) Killian Overmeire	Jartazi	QTeam
Mechelen	(Belgium) Yannick Ferrera	(Belgium) Seth De Witte	Kappa	Telenet
Oostende	(Belgium) Yves Vanderhaeghe	(France) Sebastien Siani	Joma	Willems Veranda's
Sint-Truiden	(Croatia) Ivan Leko	(Belgium) Steven De Petter	Kappa	Golden Palace
Standard Liège	(Serbia) Aleksandar Janković	(Denmark) Alexander Scholz	Kappa	BASE
Waasland-Beveren	(North Macedonia) Čedomir Janevski	(Senegal) Ibrahima Seck	Kappa	Circus
Westerlo	(Belgium) Jacky Mathijssen	(Belgium) Koen Van Langendonck	Saller	Soudal
Zulte-Waregem	(Belgium) Francky Dury	(Senegal) Mbaye Leye	Patrick	Record Bank

=== Managerial changes ===
Team	Outgoing manager	Manner of departure	Date of vacancy	Position	Replaced by	Date of appointment
Sint-Truiden	(Northern Ireland) Chris O'Loughlin	Sacked	End of 2015–16 season	Pre-season	(Croatia) Ivan Leko	14 April 2016
Anderlecht	(Kosovo) Besnik Hasi	Mutual consent	End of 2015–16 season	Pre-season	(Switzerland) René Weiler	21 June 2016
Kortrijk	(Belgium) Patrick De Wilde	Mutual consent	End of 2015–16 season	Pre-season	(France) Karim Belhocine	1 July 2016
Kortrijk	(France) Karim Belhocine	Did not possess Pro-licence diploma	29 August 2016	8th	(Belgium) Bart Van Lancker	29 August 2016
Standard Liège	(Belgium) Yannick Ferrera	Sacked	6 September 2016	10th	(Serbia) Aleksandar Janković	6 September 2016
Mechelen	(Serbia) Aleksandar Janković	Signed by Standard Liège	6 September 2016	7th	(Belgium) Yannick Ferrera	12 September 2016
Westerlo	(Belgium) Bob Peeters	Sacked	13 September 2016	16th	(Belgium) Jacky Mathijssen	14 September 2016
Lokeren	(Belgium) Georges Leekens	Sacked	26 October 2016	12th	(Iceland) Rúnar Kristinsson	28 October 2016
Waasland-Beveren	(Belgium) Stijn Vreven	Sacked	28 October 2016	14th	(North Macedonia) Čedomir Janevski	7 November 2016
Excel Mouscron	(Belgium) Glen De Boeck	Sacked	5 December 2016	15th	(Romania) Mircea Rednic	6 December 2016
Genk	(Belgium) Peter Maes	Sacked	26 December 2016	9th	(Netherlands) Albert Stuivenberg	27 December 2016
Kortrijk	(Belgium) Bart Van Lancker	Belhocine obtained Pro-licence diploma	8 March 2017	10th	(France) Karim Belhocine	8 March 2017
Standard Liège	(Serbia) Aleksandar Janković	Sacked	17 April 2017	Regular season: 9th Europa League POs: 5th	(Belgium) José Jeunechamps (caretaker)	17 April 2017

== Regular season ==
=== League table ===
Pos	Team	Pld	W	D	L	GF	GA	GD	Pts	Qualification or relegation
1	Anderlecht	30	18	7	5	67	30	+37	61	Qualification for the championship play-offs
2	Club Brugge	30	18	5	7	56	24	+32	59	Qualification for the championship play-offs
3	Zulte Waregem	30	15	9	6	49	38	+11	54	Qualification for the championship play-offs
4	Gent	30	14	8	8	45	29	+16	50	Qualification for the championship play-offs
5	Oostende	30	14	8	8	52	37	+15	50	Qualification for the championship play-offs
6	Charleroi	30	13	10	7	34	29	+5	49 (Note: The match between Charleroi and Standard Liège on 4 December was stopped after 68 minutes after supporters from both teams had been throwing objects and fireworks onto the pitch, with Standard leading 3–1. On 15 December, the Royal Belgian Football Association decided to award zero points to both teams. Standard appealed this decision, however the Belgian arbitration court for sports finally ruled that the decision would stand, meaning the 3–1 score was kept but no points were awarded. Standard Liège was however relieved of the penalty to play one match behind closed doors.)	Qualification for the championship play-offs
7	Mechelen	30	14	6	10	41	36	+5	48	Qualification for the Europa League play-offs
8	Genk	30	14	6	10	40	35	+5	48	Qualification for the Europa League play-offs
9	Standard Liège	30	10	12	8	47	38	+9	39	Qualification for the Europa League play-offs
10	Kortrijk	30	8	7	15	38	55	−17	31	Qualification for the Europa League play-offs
11	Lokeren	30	7	10	13	24	34	−10	31	Qualification for the Europa League play-offs
12	Sint-Truiden	30	8	6	16	35	48	−13	30	Qualification for the Europa League play-offs
13	Eupen	30	8	6	16	40	64	−24	30	Qualification for the Europa League play-offs
14	Waasland-Beveren	30	7	9	14	28	43	−15	30	Qualification for the Europa League play-offs
15	Excel Mouscron	30	7	3	20	29	53	−24	24	Qualification for the Europa League play-offs
16	Westerlo (R)	30	5	8	17	33	65	−32	23	Relegation to First Division B

Source: Belgian First Division A (in Dutch), Soccerway
Rules for classification: 1) Points; 2) Matches won; 3) Goal difference; 4) Goals scored; 5) Away goals scored; 6) Away matches won; 7) Play-off.
(R) Relegated

=== Results ===
Home \ Away	AND	BRU	CHA	EUP	GNK	GNT	KVK	LOK	KVM	EXM	KVO	STA	STV	WBE	WES	ZWA
Anderlecht	—	0–0	3–2	4–0	2–0	2–2	5–1	1–0	2–0	7–0	1–1	0–0	3–1	3–0	1–2	4–2
Club Brugge	2–1	—	1–0	3–2	1–1	1–0	5–1	1–0	6–1	2–1	2–0	2–2	2–2	2–1	4–0	5–0
Charleroi	0–2	1–0	—	3–2	2–1	1–1	1–1	2–1	0–0	2–0	2–1	1–3 (Note: The match between Charleroi and Standard Liège on 4 December was stopped after 68 minutes after supporters from both teams had been throwing objects and fireworks onto the pitch, with Standard leading 3–1. On 15 December, the Royal Belgian Football Association decided to award zero points to both teams. Standard appealed this decision, however the Belgian arbitration court for sports finally ruled that the decision would stand, meaning the 3–1 score was kept but no points were awarded. Standard Liège was however relieved of the penalty to play one match behind closed doors.)	1–0	1–0	2–1	2–1
Eupen	2–2	1–4	2–2	—	0–1	3–2	1–0	2–2	0–2	1–4	2–1	2–2	4–2	0–2	3–3	1–3
Genk	0–2	2–1	1–1	2–0	—	2–0	3–0	1–2	2–1	1–0	2–1	2–2	1–0	2–2	2–1	1–0
Gent	2–3	2–0	1–0	0–1	1–0	—	3–0	3–0	3–0	3–1	1–1	1–0	2–1	2–0	4–2	3–0
Kortrijk	1–3	2–1	2–1	1–1	4–1	1–1	—	2–1	0–2	0–2	0–2	3–3	0–1	1–2	4–1	2–3
Lokeren	0–0	1–0	0–0	1–2	0–3	0–0	2–1	—	0–0	2–1	1–2	0–1	1–0	0–0	3–0	1–1
Mechelen	3–2	0–2	1–0	1–0	1–0	2–0	0–0	3–0	—	2–0	2–3	2–1	2–0	2–0	1–2	2–3
Mouscron	1–2	0–3	0–1	3–0	2–2	0–2	0–1	2–1	1–4	—	1–2	1–0	2–1	1–2	0–0	1–5
Oostende	1–4	1–0	1–2	1–3	6–0	1–0	2–2	0–0	2–0	2–1	—	3–1	2–2	2–1	5–0	1–1
Standard Liège	0–1	0–3	0–0	3–0	2–0	1–1	0–3	1–1	2–2	2–1	2–2	—	2–0	5–0	3–1	4–1
Sint-Truiden	0–0	0–1	2–2	2–1	0–3	3–1	1–2	1–0	2–1	1–0	3–0	2–2	—	4–1	2–2	0–2
Waasland-Beveren	2–1	1–0	0–1	4–2	0–0	2–3	1–1	1–1	2–2	0–0	0–1	0–1	3–1	—	0–0	0–2
Westerlo	2–4	1–2	0–0	1–2	0–4	0–0	4–1	1–3	1–2	1–3	0–4	2–2	1–0	1–0	—	1–2
Zulte Waregem	3–2	0–0	1–1	3–0	1–0	1–1	2–1	2–0	0–0	1–0	1–1	1–0	4–1	1–1	2–2	—

Source: Belgian Pro League (in Dutch)
Legend: Blue = home team win; Yellow = draw; Red = away team win.

== Championship play-offs ==
The points obtained during the regular season were halved (and rounded up) before the start of the playoff. As a result, the teams started with the following points before the playoff: Anderlecht 31 points, Club Brugge 30, Zulte Waregem 27, Gent 25, Oostende 25 and Charleroi 25. The points of Anderlecht, Club Brugge and Charleroi were rounded up, therefore in case of any ties on points at the end of the playoffs, the half point would have been deducted for these teams.

=== League table ===
Pos	Team	Pld	W	D	L	GF	GA	GD	Pts	Qualification	AND	CLU	GNT	OOS	CHA	ZWA
1	Anderlecht (C)	10	6	3	1	14	6	+8	52	Qualification for the Champions League group stage	—	2–0	0–0	3–2	0–1	2–0
2	Club Brugge	10	4	3	3	16	14	+2	45	Qualification for the Champions League third qualifying round	1–1	—	2–1	3–1	1–1	2–1
3	Gent	10	4	4	2	16	11	+5	41	Qualification for the Europa League third qualifying round	0–0	2–1	—	1–1	1–1	5–2
4	Oostende (O)	10	3	3	4	14	17	−3	37	Qualification for the Europa League play-off final	0–1	2–1	4–3	—	1–0	1–1
5	Charleroi	10	2	4	4	10	13	−3	35		1–3	1–3	0–1	1–1	—	2–0
6	Zulte Waregem	10	1	3	6	12	21	−9	33	Qualification for the Europa League group stage (Note: Zulte Waregem qualified for the Europa League group stage by winning the 2016–17 Belgian Cup.)	1–2	2–2	0–2	3–1	2–2	—

Source: Soccerway
Rules for classification: 1) Points; 2) Points without (possible) half points added due to rounding; 3) Matches won; 4) Goal difference; 5) Goals scored; 6) Away goals scored; 7) Away matches won; 8) Play-off.
(C) Champions; (O) Play-off winners

== Europa League play-offs ==
Group A of the play-offs consisted of the teams finishing in positions 7, 9, 12 and 14 during the regular season and the first and third placed team in the qualifying positions in the 2016–17 Belgian First Division B. The teams finishing in positions 8, 10, 11, 13 and 15 joined the second placed qualifier from the 2016–17 Belgian First Division B to form group B.

=== Group A ===
Pos	Team	Pld	W	D	L	GF	GA	GD	Pts	Qualification	STV	KVM	W-B	STA	USG	LIE
1	Sint-Truiden (Q)	10	7	1	2	23	7	+16	22	Qualification for the Europa League play-off semi-finals	—	7–0	3–0	1–0	0–1	2–1
2	Mechelen	10	5	1	4	7	16	−9	16		1–0	—	1–3	1–0	1–0	1–0
3	Waasland-Beveren	10	5	0	5	17	19	−2	15		0–1	1–2	—	1–3	1–4	3–2
4	Standard Liège	10	4	2	4	14	11	+3	14		2–2	2–0	0–2	—	3–1	2–0
5	Union SG	10	3	1	6	15	19	−4	10		1–4	3–0	1–3	2–2	—	1–3
6	Lierse	10	3	1	6	12	16	−4	10		1–3	0–0	2–3	1–0	2–1	—

Rules for classification: 1) Points; 2) Matches won; 3) Goal difference; 4) Goals scored; 5) Away goals scored; 6) Away matches won; 7) Play-off.
(Q) Qualified for the phase indicated

=== Group B ===
Pos	Team	Pld	W	D	L	GF	GA	GD	Pts	Qualification	GNK	LOK	EUP	KVK	EXM	ROE
1	Genk (Q)	10	8	2	0	26	4	+22	26	Qualification for the Europa League play-off semi-finals	—	4–0	2–1	3–0	6–0	3–1
2	Lokeren	10	3	6	1	21	20	+1	15		1–1	—	4–1	0–0	2–2	2–1
3	Eupen	10	3	4	3	20	20	0	13		1–1	3–3	—	3–2	2–0	2–2
4	Kortrijk	10	3	3	4	15	22	−7	12		0–3	4–4	3–3	—	2–1	0–3
5	Excel Mouscron	10	2	2	6	11	22	−11	8		0–2	2–2	0–2	0–1	—	1–0
6	Roeselare	10	2	1	7	17	22	−5	7		0–1	2–3	3–2	2–3	3–5	—

Rules for classification: 1) Points; 2) Matches won; 3) Goal difference; 4) Goals scored; 5) Away goals scored; 6) Away matches won; 7) Play-off.
(Q) Qualified for the phase indicated

=== Semi-final ===
The winners of both play-off groups competed in one match to play the fourth-placed or fifth-placed team of the championship play-offs for a spot in the final. This match was played on the field of the highest ranked team in the regular competition. The winner of the semi-final advanced to the final to play for a spot in the third qualifying round of the 2017–18 UEFA Europa League.

27 May 2017
20:30 CEST

Genk	3–0	Sint-Truiden
Buffel 32'; Boëtius 43'; Samatta 55'	Pro League; Soccerway

Luminus Arena, Genk
Referee: Nicolas Laforge

=== Final ===
The winner of the Europa League play-off semi-final and the fourth-placed team played one match to determine the Europa League play-off winner. KV Oostende qualified for the third qualifying round of the 2017–18 UEFA Europa League, where they were eliminated by Olympique Marseille.

31 May 2017
20:30 CEST

Oostende	3–1	Genk
Akpala 27'; Rozehnal 32'; Jali 51'	Sporza	Schrijvers 45' (pen.)

Versluys Arena, Ostend
Referee: Lawrence Visser

== Season statistics ==
=== Top scorers ===
As of matches played on 20 May 2017.

Rank	Player	Club	Goals
1	(Nigeria) Henry Onyekuru	Eupen	22
1	(Poland) Łukasz Teodorczyk	Anderlecht	22
3	(Portugal) Orlando Sá	Standard	17
4	(Senegal) Mbaye Leye	Zulte Waregem	16
4	(Algeria) Idriss Saadi	Kortrijk	16
4	(Belgium) Jelle Vossen	Club Brugge	16
7	(Algeria) Ishak Belfodil	Standard	14
7	(Belgium) Pieter Gerkens	Sint-Truiden	14
7	(Colombia) José Izquierdo	Club Brugge	14
10	(Belgium) Youri Tielemans	Anderlecht	13

=== Top assists ===
As of matches played on 26 April 2017.

Rank	Player	Club	Assists
1	(Spain) Alejandro Pozuelo	Genk	11
1	(Belgium) Youri Tielemans	Anderlecht	11
1	(Belgium) Siebe Schrijvers	Waasland-Beveren/Genk	11
4	(Algeria) Sofiane Hanni	Anderlecht	10
4	(Belgium) Stef Peeters	Sint-Truiden	10
6	(Belgium) Onur Kaya	Zulte Waregem	9
7	(Romania) Alexandru Chipciu	Anderlecht	8
7	(Senegal) Mamadou Sylla	Eupen	8
7	(Brazil) Fernando Canesin	Oostende	8
10	(Netherlands) Ruud Vormer	Club Brugge	7

=== Clean sheets ===
As of matches played on 25 February 2017.

Rank	Player	Club	Clean sheets
1	(France) Ludovic Butelle	Club Brugge	12
2	(Belgium) Colin Coosemans	Mechelen	9
2	(France) Nicolas Penneteau	Charleroi	9
4	(Belgium) Jean-François Gillet	Standard	8
5	(Netherlands) Marco Bizot	Genk	7
6	(Belgium) Frank Boeckx	Anderlecht	6
6	(Belgium) Sammy Bossut	Zulte Waregem	6
6	(Ivory Coast) Copa	Lokeren	6
6	(Belgium) Koen Van Langendonck	Westerlo	6
10	(France) William Dutoit	Sint-Truiden & Oostende	5
10	(Hungary) László Köteles	Waasland-Beveren	5
10	(Luxembourg) Anthony Moris	Mechelen	5
10	(Belgium) Davy Roef	Anderlecht	5
10	(Belgium) Yannick Thoelen	Gent	5

== Number of teams by provinces ==
Number of teams	Province or region	Team(s)
4	West Flanders	Club Brugge, Kortrijk, Oostende and Zulte Waregem
3	East Flanders	Gent, Lokeren and Waasland-Beveren
2	Antwerp	Mechelen and Westerlo
2	Hainaut	Charleroi and Mouscron
2	Liège	Eupen and Standard Liège
2	Limburg	Genk and Sint-Truiden
1	Brussels	Anderlecht
0	Flemish Brabant, Walloon Brabant, Namur and Luxembourg	/

== Awards ==
=== Annual awards ===
Award	Player	Club
Belgian Professional Footballer of the Year	(Belgium) Youri Tielemans	Anderlecht
Belgian Young Professional Footballer of the Year	(Belgium) Landry Dimata	KV Oostende
Belgian Professional Football Manager of the Year	(Germany) René Weiler	Anderlecht

=== Team of the Season ===
Team of the Season
Goalkeeper	(Belgium) Colin Coosemans (KV Mechelen)			
Defence	(Senegal) Kara Mbodj (Anderlecht)	(The Gambia) Omar Colley (Genk)	(France) Samuel Gigot (Gent)	(Serbia) Ivan Obradović (Anderlecht)
Midfield	(Belgium) Leander Dendoncker (Anderlecht)		(Brazil) Renato Neto (Gent)	(Netherlands) Ruud Vormer (Club Brugge)
Attack	(Belgium) Youri Tielemans (Anderlecht)		(Colombia) José Izquierdo (Club Brugge)	(Poland) Łukasz Teodorczyk (Anderlecht)

== Attendances ==
The football clubs listed by average home league attendance:

Football club	Home average
Club Brugge	26,691
Standard de Liège	21,802
KAA Gent	19,807
RSC Anderlecht	18,333
KRC Genk	16,104
KV Mechelen	11,991
Zulte Waregem	9,578
Sporting Charleroi	9,547
KV Oostende	7,344
Sporting Lokeren	7,117
STVV	6,874
KV Kortrijk	6,248
KVC Westerlo	5,773
Waasland-Beveren	4,537
KAS Eupen	3,423
Royal Excel Mouscron	3,337
