= 1949 World Weightlifting Championships =

International weightlifting competition

1949 Men's World Championships

The 1949 Men's World Weightlifting Championships were held in Scheveningen, Netherlands from September 4 to September 6, 1949. There were 38 men in action from 13 nations.

== Medal summary ==
| Event | Gold | | Silver | | Bronze | |
|---|---|---|---|---|---|---|
| Bantamweight; 56 kg | Mahmoud Namjoo; Iran | 315.0 kg | Kamal Mahgoub; Egypt | 295.0 kg | Joseph DePietro; United States | 295.0 kg |
| Featherweight; 60 kg | Mahmoud Fayad; Egypt | 332.5 kg | Johan Runge; Denmark | 312.5 kg | Max Heral; France | 302.5 kg |
| Lightweight; 67.5 kg | Ibrahim Shams; Egypt | 352.5 kg | Joe Pitman; United States | 342.5 kg | Arvid Andersson; Sweden | 322.5 kg |
| Middleweight; 75 kg | Khadr El-Touni; Egypt | 397.5 kg | Pete George; United States | 385.0 kg | Hassan Rahnavardi; Iran | 340.0 kg |
| Light heavyweight 82.5 kg | Stanley Stanczyk; United States | 412.5 kg | Jean Debuf; France | 382.5 kg | Rasoul Raeisi; Iran | 365.0 kg |
| Heavyweight +82.5 kg | John Davis; United States | 442.5 kg | Niels Petersen; Denmark | 390.0 kg | Robert Allart; Belgium | 387.5 kg |

== Medal table ==
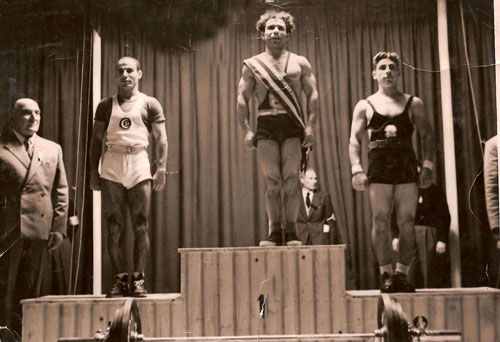
Medal winners of freestyle 68 kg. From left to right, Kamal Mahgoub, Mahmoud Namjoo and Joseph DePietro

| Rank | Nation | Gold | Silver | Bronze | Total |
|---|---|---|---|---|---|
| 1 | Egypt | 3 | 1 | 0 | 4 |
| 2 | United States | 2 | 2 | 1 | 5 |
| 3 | Iran | 1 | 0 | 2 | 3 |
| 4 | Denmark | 0 | 2 | 0 | 2 |
| 5 | France | 0 | 1 | 1 | 2 |
| 6 | Belgium | 0 | 0 | 1 | 1 |
| 6 | Sweden | 0 | 0 | 1 | 1 |
| Totals (7 entries) | | 6 | 6 | 6 | 18 |
