= Allart =

Allart is a surname. Notable people with the surname include:

- Alexis Allart (born 1986), French football player
- Constant Allart (1796–1861), French politician
- Hortense Allart (1801–1879), Italian-French author
- Robert Allart (born 1913), Belgian weightlifter

== ship ==
HDMS Allart (1807), originally Danish, captured at the Battle of Copenhagen (1807). Later recaptured by Denmark.
