= Juan Cortés =

Juan Cortés may refer to:

- Juan Cortés (footballer) (1938–1998), Chilean football attacking midfielder
- Juan Manuel Cortés (born 1980), Argentine football forward
- Juan Cortés (football manager) (born 1983), Spanish football manager

== See also ==
- Juan Cortez, fictional character in Grand Theft Auto: Vice City video game
- Juan Cortéz (born 2005), Mexican professional footballer
