= Van Langendonck =

Van Langendonck is a surname. Notable people with the surname include:

- Dries Van Langendonck (born 2010), Belgian racing driver
- Jan Vanlangendonck (born 1960), Belgian tennis player
- Koen Van Langendonck (born 1989), Belgian footballer
