= Alphonso Correia =

Guyanese weightlifter (1927–2005)

Personal information
- Full name: Alphonso Correia Long
- Nationality: Guyanese
- Born: 1927
- Died: 2005 (aged 77–78)

Sport
- Sport: Weightlifting

Alphonso Correia Long (1927–2005) was a Guyanese weightlifter. Correia would compete at the 1948 Summer Olympics, representing British Guiana in weightlifting. He would be one of the first weightlifters for the nation to compete at an Olympic Games.

Correia would compete in the men's featherweight category against 22 other competitors. There, he would finish with a total of 275 kilograms and place 18th in the event.

== Biography ==
Alphonso Correia Long was born in 1927.

British Guiana (now Guyana) would compete at the 1948 Summer Olympics for its first appearance at any edition of the Olympic Games. There, Correia would be part of the delegation and compete in the men's featherweight category for athletes that weighed 60 kilograms or less. Alongside his teammate Orlando Chaves, they would be the first weightlifters to compete at the Olympic Games for Guyana. Correia would compete on 9 August 1948 against 22 other competitors.

His first lift in the event would be the military press. In the lift, Correia would record a weight of 75 kilograms and place equal 20th in the lift. In the snatch, he would record a weight of 85 kilograms and place equal 16th in the lift. The last lift would be the clean and jerk, there, he would record a weight of 115 kilograms and place equal 13th in the lift. Overall, he would finish with a total of 275 kilograms and place 18th. The eventual winner of the event would be Mahmoud Fayad of Egypt with a world record-setting total of 332.5 kilograms.

Long died in 2005.
