= Shalakani =

Shalakani, El-Shalakani, or el Shalakani (Arabic: الشلقاني) is a surname found in Egypt. Notable people with this surname include:

- Moustafa El-Shalakani (born 1933), an Egyptian weightlifter.
- Sherihan Ahmed Abdel Fattah el Shalakani (born 1964), an Egyptian actress
