= Weightlifting at the 1960 Summer Olympics – Men's 60 kg =

Weightlifting at the Olympics

Men's 60 kg at the Games of the XVII Olympiad
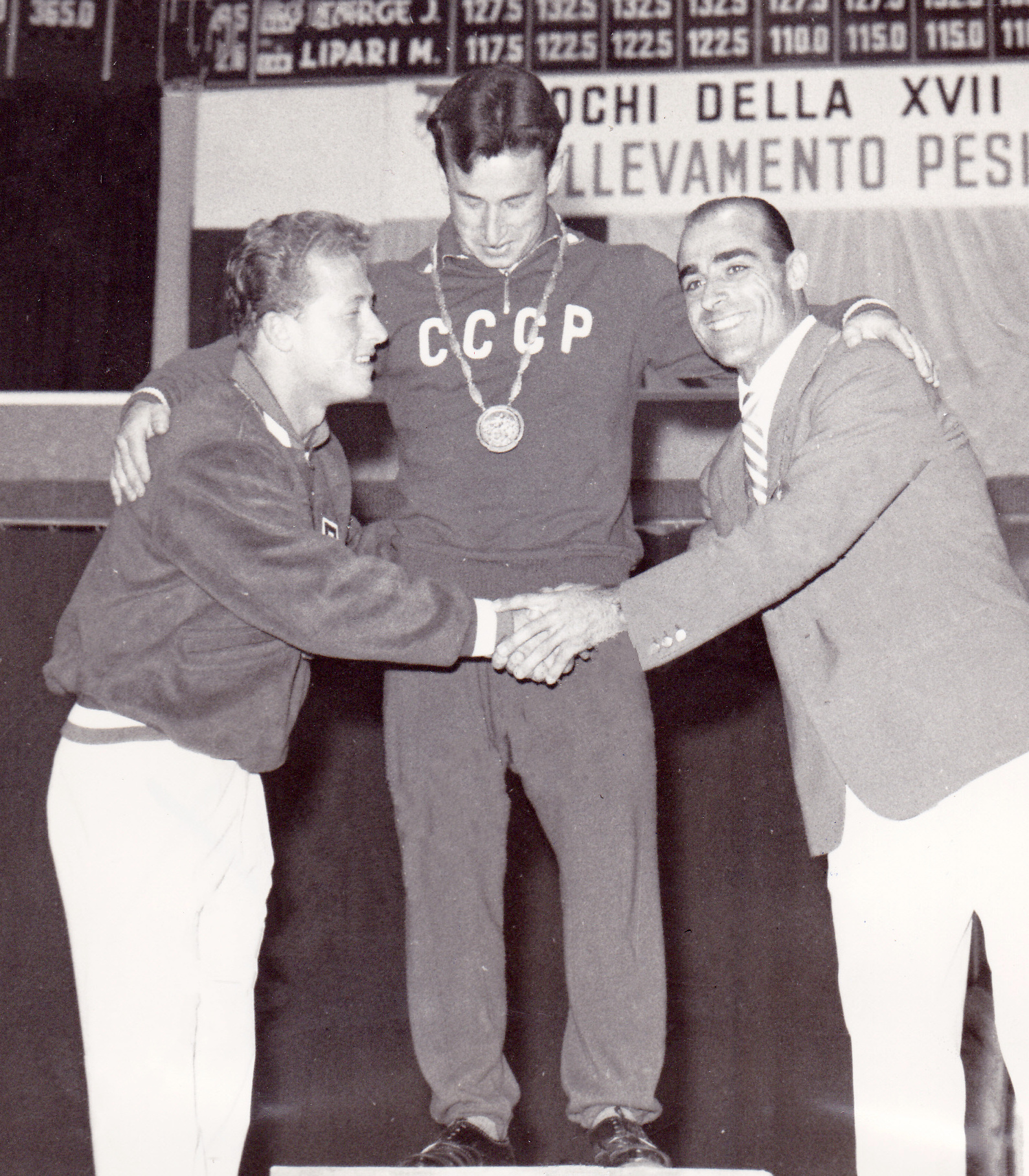
- Venue: Palazzetto dello Sport
- Date: 7 September 1960
- Competitors: 28 from 25 nations
- Winning total: 372.5 kg WR

Medalists
1st place, gold medalist(s)		Yevgeny Minayev	Soviet Union
2nd place, silver medalist(s)		Isaac Berger	United States
3rd place, bronze medalist(s)		Sebastiano Mannironi	Italy

The men's 60 kg weightlifting competition at the 1960 Summer Olympics in Rome took place on 7 September at the Palazzetto dello Sport. It was the ninth appearance of the featherweight class.

== Results ==
Rank	Name	Country	kg
1	Yevgeny Minayev	Soviet Union	372.5
2	Isaac Berger	United States	362.5
3	Sebastiano Mannironi	Italy	352.5
4	Kim Hae-nam	South Korea	345.0
5	Yukio Furuyama	Japan	345.0
6	Hosni Abbas	United Arab Republic	337.5
7	Tun Maung Kywe	Burma	327.5
8	Alberto Nogar	Philippines	325.0
9	Kiril Georgiev	Bulgaria	325.0
10	Moustafa El-Shalakani	United Arab Republic	320.0
11	Chung Kum Weng	Malaya	315.0
12	Laxmi Kanta Das	India	315.0
13	Georg Miske	United Team of Germany	310.0
14	Salah Chammah	Lebanon	307.5
15	Mauro Alanís	Mexico	297.5
16	Hermann Dodojacek	Austria	295.0
17	Ángel Famiglietti	Panama	292.5
18	Allan Robinson	Great Britain	292.5
19	Gezi Cohen	Israel	285.0
20	Walter Legel	Austria	282.5
21	José Luis Izquierdo	Spain	275.0
22	Sammy Dalzell	Ireland	270.0
AC	Alan Oshyer	Australia	92.5
AC	Ali Safa Sonboli	Iran	92.5
AC	Yoshinobu Fujishima	Japan	200.0
AC	Jorge Pineda	Colombia	205.0
AC	Asber Nasution	Indonesia	DNF
AC	Gaston Gaffney	South Africa	DNF
