= Yevgeny Minayev =

Russian weightlifter (1933–1993)

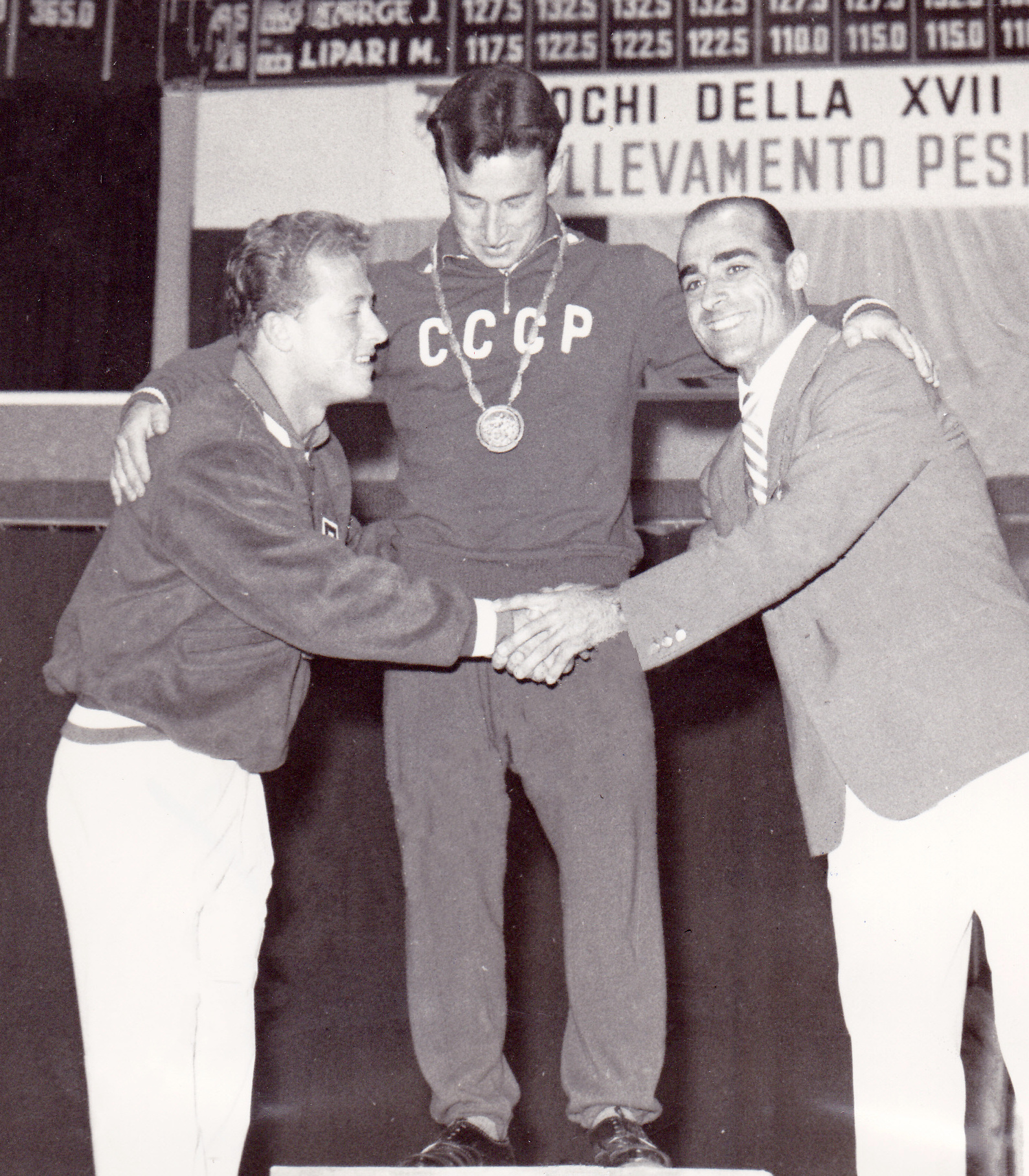
- Isaac Berger, Minayev, and Sebastiano Mannironi at the 1960 Olympics

Personal information
- Full name: Yevgeny Gavrilovich Minayev
- Born: 21 March 1933 Klin, Klinsky District, Moscow Oblast, Russian SFSR, Soviet Union
- Died: 8 December 1993 (aged 60) Klin, Moscow Oblast, Russia
- Height: 1.65 m (5 ft 5 in)
- Weight: 75 kg (165 lb)

Sport
- Sport: Weightlifting
- Club: Soviet Army
Medal record
Representing the Soviet Union
Olympic Games
Gold medal – first place	1960 Rome	-60 kg
Silver medal – second place	1956 Melbourne	-60 kg
World Championships
Gold medal – first place	1957 Teheran	-60 kg
Silver medal – second place	1958 Stockholm	-60 kg
Silver medal – second place	1961 Vienna	-60 kg
Gold medal – first place	1962 Budapest	-60 kg

Yevgeny Gavrilovich Minayev (Russian: Евгений Гаврилович Минаев; 21 May 1933 – 8 December 1993) was a Russian weightlifter who competed for the Soviet Union. He won a silver medal at the 1956 Summer Olympics and a gold medal at the 1960 Summer Olympics.

== Career ==
Minayev started training in weightlifting while serving in the Soviet Army. At his first competition, the 1956 Soviet Championships, Minayev broke the world record in the press, but finished only fourth overall. Yet he was selected for the 1956 Olympics, as a reserve, and won a silver behind Isaac Berger; he lost to Berger also at the 1958 and 1961 world championships, but beat him at the 1957 and 1962 world championships and at the 1960 Olympics, in a 9-hour battle. Domestically, Minayev won seven national titles (1957–59, 1961, 1963, 1965–66). He also became European champion in 1958, 1960 and 1962, winning a silver in 1961. During his career, Minayev set 13 world records, nine in the press, one in the snatch, and three in the total.

Minayev was known for his insubordination. He refused any coach and often missed training sessions of the national team. Consequently, he was expelled from the team in the mid-1960s despite being a national champion. He retired in 1966 and briefly worked as a weightlifting coach before returning to his native Klin, where he took temporary jobs at farms and mechanical workshops. Minayev left a car, an apartment and his family in Moscow. He spent his last years homeless on the streets of Klin, where he froze to death in December 1993.
