= Sasha Jankovic =

Sasha Jankovic may refer to:

- Saša Janković (born 1970), Ombudsman of the Republic of Serbia
- Aleksandar Janković (born 1972), Serbian football coach
