= Kiril Georgiev (disambiguation) =

Kiril Georgiev can refer to:

- Kiril Georgiev (born 1965), Bulgarian chess grandmaster
- Kiril Georgiev (cyclist), Bulgarian cyclist
- Kiril Georgiev (weightlifter), Bulgarian weightlifter
