= 1955 World Weightlifting Championships =

International weightlifting competition

1955 Men's World Championships

The 1955 Men's World Weightlifting Championships were held in Munich, West Germany, from October 12 to October 16, 1955. There were 108 men in action from 25 nations.

== Medal summary ==
Event	Gold		Silver		Bronze	
Bantamweight; 56 kg	Vladimir Stogov; Soviet Union	335.0 kg	Charles Vinci; United States	317.5 kg	Mahmoud Namjoo; Iran	312.5 kg
Featherweight; 60 kg	Rafael Chimishkyan; Soviet Union	350.0 kg	Ivan Udodov; Soviet Union	345.0 kg	Kamal Mahgoub; Egypt	327.5 kg
Lightweight; 67.5 kg	Nikolay Kostylev; Soviet Union	382.5 kg	Said Khalifa Gouda; Egypt	365.0 kg	Nil Tun Maung; Burma	355.0 kg
Middleweight; 75 kg	Pete George; United States	405.0 kg	Fyodor Bogdanovsky; Soviet Union	405.0 kg	Ingemar Franzén; Sweden	372.5 kg
Light heavyweight 82.5 kg	Tommy Kono; United States	435.0 kg	Vasily Stepanov; Soviet Union	425.0 kg	Jim George; United States	402.5 kg
Middle heavyweight 90 kg	Arkady Vorobyov; Soviet Union	455.0 kg	Clyde Emrich; United States	427.5 kg	Hassan Rahnavardi; Iran	425.0 kg
Heavyweight +90 kg	Paul Anderson; United States	512.5 kg	James Bradford; United States	475.0 kg	Eino Mäkinen; Finland	422.5 kg

== Medal table ==
Rank	Nation	Gold	Silver	Bronze	Total
1	Soviet Union	4	3	0	7
2	United States	3	3	1	7
3	Egypt	0	1	1	2
4	Iran	0	0	2	2
5	Burma	0	0	1	1
5	Finland	0	0	1	1
5	Sweden	0	0	1	1
Totals (7 entries)		7	7	7	21
