= Kamal Mahgoub =

Egyptian weightlifter (1921–2007)

Personal information
- Born: 10 December 1921
- Died: 9 February 2007 (aged 85)

Sport
- Sport: Weightlifting
Medal record
Representing Egypt
World Weightlifting Championships
Silver medal – second place	1949 Scheveningen	-56 kg
Bronze medal – third place	1950 Paris	-56 kg
Bronze medal – third place	1951 Milan	-56 kg
Silver medal – second place	1953 Stockholm	-56 kg
Bronze medal – third place	1955 Munich	-60 kg

Kamal Mahgoub Mahmoud (10 December 1921 – 9 February 2007) was a bantamweight weightlifter from Egypt who set a world record in the snatch in 1950. He won two silver and three bronze medals at the world championships in 1949–1955 and placed fifth at the 1952 Summer Olympics.
