= Richard Rieder =

Swiss weightlifter (born 1914)

Personal information
- Nationality: Swiss
- Born: 14 June 1914 Haßloch, Germany

Sport
- Sport: Weightlifting

Richard Rieder (born 14 June 1914, date of death unknown) was a Swiss weightlifter. He competed in the men's featherweight event at the 1948 Summer Olympics.
