= Denis Hallett =

British weightlifter

Personal information
- Nationality: British
- Born: 10 December 1922; Newcastle-under-Lyme, England
- Died: 11 November 2013 (aged 90); Doncaster, England

Sport
- Sport: Weightlifting

Denis William Hallett (10 December 1922 – 11 November 2013) was a British weightlifter. He competed in the men's featherweight event at the 1948 Summer Olympics.
