= Oswald Junkes =

German weightlifter

Personal information
- Nationality: German
- Born: 13 June 1921; Trier, Germany
- Died: 2 November 1993 (aged 72); Newel, Germany

Sport
- Sport: Weightlifting

Oswald Junkes (13 June 1921 – 2 November 1993) was a German weightlifter. He competed in the men's featherweight event at the 1952 Summer Olympics.
