= Jorge Pineda (weightlifter) =

Colombian weightlifter

Personal information
- Nationality: Colombian
- Born: 20 August 1939 (age 85); Tunja, Colombia

Sport
- Sport: Weightlifting

Jorge Pineda (born 20 August 1939) is a Colombian weightlifter. He competed in the men's featherweight event at the 1960 Summer Olympics.
