= Takahiro Yamaguchi (weightlifter) =

Japanese weightlifter

Personal information
- Nationality: Japanese
- Born: 16 October 1936 (age 88)

Sport
- Sport: Weightlifting

Takahiro Yamaguchi (born 16 October 1936) is a Japanese weightlifter. He competed in the men's featherweight event at the 1956 Summer Olympics.
