= Yoshinobu Fujishima =

Japanese weightlifter

Personal information
- Nationality: Japanese
- Born: 4 November 1939 (age 85); Tokushima, Japan

Sport
- Sport: Weightlifting

Yoshinobu Fujishima (born 4 November 1939) is a Japanese weightlifter. He competed in the men's featherweight event at the 1960 Summer Olympics.
