= Giovanni Cocco =

Italian weightlifter

Personal information
- Nationality: Italian
- Born: 1 June 1921; Cagliari, Italy
- Died: 16 January 2007 (aged 85); Cagliari, Italy

Sport
- Sport: Weightlifting

Giovanni Cocco (1 June 1921 – 16 January 2007) was an Italian weightlifter. He competed in the men's featherweight event at the 1952 Summer Olympics.
