= Hiroyoshi Shiratori =

Japanese weightlifter

Personal information
- Nationality: Japanese
- Born: 15 April 1933 (age 91)

Sport
- Sport: Weightlifting

Hiroyoshi Shiratori (born 15 April 1933) is a Japanese weightlifter. He competed in the men's featherweight event at the 1956 Summer Olympics.
