= Asber Nasution =

Indonesian weightlifter (born 1939)

Personal information
- Nationality: Indonesian
- Born: 15 December 1939 (age 85); Tebing Tinggi, Indonesia

Sport
- Sport: Weightlifting

Asber Nasution (born 15 December 1939) is an Indonesian weightlifter. He competed in the men's featherweight event at the 1960 Summer Olympics.
