= James van Rensburg =

South African weightlifter

Personal information
- Nationality: South African
- Born: 28 June 1924; Kimberley, South Africa
- Died: 29 February 1996 (aged 71); Trichardt, South Africa

Sport
- Sport: Weightlifting

James van Rensburg (28 June 1924 – 29 February 1996) was a South African weightlifter. He competed in the men's featherweight event at the 1952 Summer Olympics.
