= Simon Williams (weightlifter) =

Jamaican weightlifter (1919–2000)

Sigis Williams
Personal information
- Full name: Sigismund Leopold Williams
- Born: 13 April 1919 Beckford Kraal, Clarendon Parish, Colony of Jamaica, British Empire
- Died: 2000 (age 80–81) Middlesex County, Jamaica

Sport
- Sport: Weightlifting

Sigismund Leopold Williams, also known as Simon Williams or Sigis Williams, (13 April 1919 – 2000) was a Jamaican weightlifter. Born in Beckford Kraal of Clarendon Parish under British rule, he competed as a weightlifter for Jamaica. He was selected to compete for Jamaica at the 1948 Summer Olympics for their first appearance. In the men's featherweight event, he placed 17th overall.

== Biography ==
Sigismund Leopold Williams, also known as Simon Williams or Sigis Williams, was born on 13 April 1919 in Beckford Kraal in Clarendon Parish when Jamaica was under the colonization of the British Empire.

As an Olympic weightlifter, he was selected to compete for Jamaica at the 1948 Summer Olympics held in London, England, for their first ever appearance at an Olympic Games. There, Williams competed in the men's featherweight event held in the Earls Court Exhibition Centre for those who weighed 60 kilograms (130 lb) or less. He competed on 9 August 1948 against 22 other competitors. The first part of the competition was the military press, where Williams lifted 87.5 kilograms (193 lb) and placed equal eighth in the lift with four other competitors. The next part was the snatch, where he lifted 80 kilograms (180 lb) and placed equal 20th with two other competitors. The last part was the clean and jerk, where he lifted 110 kilograms (240 lb) and placed equal 18th with one other competitor. Overall, he lifted a total of 277.5 kilograms (612 lb) and placed 17th.

He later died in 2000 in Middlesex County of modern Jamaica at an age somewhere between 80 and 81.
