= Nam Su-il =

South Korean weightlifter (1912–1972)

Nam Su-Il
Personal information
- Born: 26 June 1912 Keijō, Keiki-dō, Korea, Empire of Japan
- Died: 24 May 1972 (aged 59)
- Weight: 60 kg (132 lb)

Sport
- Country: South Korea
- Sport: Weightlifting
- Weight class: 60 kg
- Team: National team
Medal record
Men's Weightlifting
Representing South Korea
World Championships
| Silver medal – second place | 1947 Philadelphia | 60 kg |
- Updated on 6 October 2016

Nam Su-Il (Korean: 남수일, 26 June 1912 – 24 May 1972) was a South Korean male weightlifter, who competed in the featherweight class and represented South Korea at international competitions. He won the silver medal at the 1947 World Weightlifting Championships in the 60 kg category. He participated at the 1948 Summer Olympics in the 60 kg event and at the 1952 Summer Olympics in the 60 kg event. He set three featherweight world records in 1938-40 – two in the press and one in the total.
