= André Le Guillerm =

French weightlifter

Personal information
- Nationality: French
- Born: 5 September 1924; Romainville, France
- Died: 2 December 2014 (aged 90)

Sport
- Sport: Weightlifting

André Le Guillerm (5 September 1924 – 2 December 2014) was a French weightlifter. He competed in the men's featherweight event at the 1948 Summer Olympics.
