= Choi Hang-gi =

South Korean weightlifter

Personal information
- Nationality: South Korean

Sport
- Sport: Weightlifting

Choi Hang-gi was a South Korean weightlifter. He competed in the men's featherweight event at the 1948 Summer Olympics.
