= Henryk Skowronek =

Polish weightlifter (1923–1981)

Personal information
- Nationality: Polish
- Born: 25 June 1923; Ruda Śląska, Poland
- Died: 26 October 1981 (aged 58); Ruda Śląska, Poland

Sport
- Sport: Weightlifting

Henryk Skowronek (25 June 1923 – 26 October 1981) was a Polish weightlifter. He competed in the men's featherweight event at the 1952 Summer Olympics.
