= Mikko Hokka =

Finnish weightlifter

Personal information
- Nationality: Finnish
- Born: 5 February 1932; Savonlinna, Finland
- Died: 18 August 1973 (aged 41); Lappeenranta, Finland

Sport
- Sport: Weightlifting

Mikko Hokka (5 February 1932 – 18 August 1973) was a Finnish weightlifter. He competed in the men's featherweight event at the 1952 Summer Olympics.
