= Sidney Kemble =

British weightlifter

Personal information
- Nationality: British
- Born: 23 January 1914; Bradford, England
- Died: 10 April 1979 (aged 65); Bradford, England

Sport
- Sport: Weightlifting

Sidney Kemble (23 January 1914 – 10 April 1979) was a British weightlifter. He competed in the men's featherweight event at the 1948 Summer Olympics.
