= Lee Gyeong-seop =

South Korean weightlifter (born 1922)

Personal information
- Nationality: South Korean
- Born: 1922

Sport
- Sport: Weightlifting

Lee Gyeong-seop (born 1922) was a South Korean weightlifter. He competed in the men's featherweight event at the 1956 Summer Olympics.
