= José Izquierdo =

José Izquierdo may refer to:

- José Izquierdo (footballer, born 1980), Spanish retired footballer
- José Izquierdo (footballer, born 1992), Colombian footballer
- Jose Izquierdo Encarnacion (born 1957), former Secretary of State in Puerto Rico
- José Guillermo Izquierdo Stella (1936–2010), former Puerto Rican politician
- José Luis Izquierdo (born 1933), Spanish Olympic weightlifter
