= Mohsen Tabatabaei =

Iranian weightlifter

Personal information
- Nationality: Iranian
- Born: 21 September 1927

Sport
- Sport: Weightlifting

Mohsen Tabatabaei (born 21 September 1927) was an Iranian weightlifter. He competed in the men's featherweight event at the 1952 Summer Olympics.
