= Rodney Wilkes =

Trinidad and Tobago weightlifter

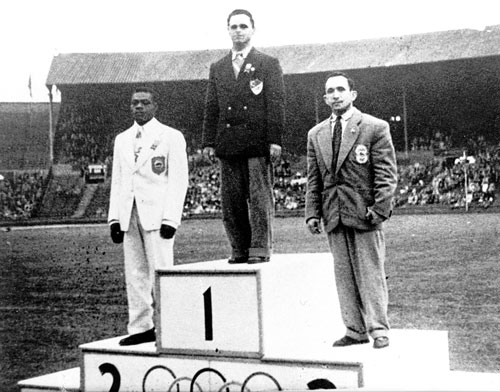
- Rodney Wilkes at second place, 1948

Personal information
- Born: 11 March 1925 San Fernando, Trinidad and Tobago
- Died: 24 March 2014 (aged 89) San Fernando, Trinidad and Tobago
Medal record
Men's Weightlifting
Representing Trinidad and Tobago
Olympic Games
Silver medal – second place	1948 London	Featherweight
Bronze medal – third place	1952 Helsinki	Featherweight
Pan American Games
Gold medal – first place	1951 Buenos Aires	Featherweight
Commonwealth Games
Gold medal – first place	1954 Vancouver	Featherweight
Bronze medal – third place	1958 Cardiff	Featherweight

Rodney Adolphus Wilkes (11 March 1925 – 24 March 2014) was a weightlifter from Trinidad and Tobago. Nicknamed "The Mighty Midget", he remained relatively unknown outside of local competition until he won the gold medal at the 1946 Central American and Caribbean Games in Barranquilla, Colombia. His performance included record lifts of 205 pounds (93 kg) in the press, 210 pounds (95 kg) in the snatch and 275 pounds (125 kg) in the clean and jerk.

He was selected to represent his country at the 1948 Olympics in London where he competed in the featherweight division. At those Games he became the first athlete from Trinidad and Tobago to win an Olympic medal by taking the silver, behind Egyptian Mahmoud Fayad. Wilkes lifted a combined 317.5 kilograms (700 lb) but Fayad set a new Olympic and World record of 332.5 kilograms (733 lb).

In 1951 Wilkes won the featherweight gold medal at the first Pan American Games in Buenos Aires. The next year he was again selected for the Olympics in Helsinki. On this occasion he won the bronze medal behind Rafael Chimishkyan and Nikolai Saksonov, both of the Soviet Union. After a brief period of retirement in 1953 Wilkes returned to competition and won gold at the 1954 British Empire and Commonwealth Games in Vancouver; four years later he won bronze at Games in Cardiff.

Wilkes final Olympic appearance came at the 1956 Melbourne Games. He finished in fourth position with a combined lift of 330 kilograms (730 lb), missing out on a medal by one place and 5 kg. He continued competing until 1960 but retired for good when he failed to make the West Indies team for the Olympics in Rome. Following his retirement he became an electrician in his home city of San Fernando, Trinidad and Tobago. Wilkes died of prostate cancer at a San Fernando hospital in 2014, aged 89.
