= Hassan Rahnavardi =

Iranian weightlifter (1927–2023)

Personal information
- Nationality: Iranian
- Born: 22 June 1927 Tabriz, Iran
- Died: 4 September 2023 (aged 96)
- Weight: 82.90 kg (182.8 lb)

Sport
- Country: Iran
- Sport: Weightlifting
- Event: 90 kg
Medal record
Representing Iran
Men's weightlifting
World Championships
Silver medal – second place	1957 Tehran	90 kg
Bronze medal – third place	1949 Scheveningen	75 kg
Bronze medal – third place	1951 Milan	82.5 kg
Bronze medal – third place	1955 Munich	90 kg
Asian Games
Gold medal – first place	1951 New Delhi	82.5 kg
Gold medal – first place	1958 Tokyo	90 kg

Mohammad Hassan Rahnavardi (Persian: محمد حسن رهنوردی; 22 June 1927 – 4 September 2023) was an Iranian physician, politician and weightlifter. He earned two gold medals in Asian Games in 1950s. He was a member of National Consultative Assembly from Sari and later from Tehran. He was a deputy minister of health and minister of education prior to the Iranian Islamic revolution. His last position was Governor of Yazd.

== Biography ==
Mohammad Hassan Rahnavardi was born in Tabriz on 22 June 1927. He had a Doctor of Dental Surgery from the University of Tehran, a master of public health from Johns Hopkins University and a DrPH from Tulane University. For five years he was the secretary general of the Iranian National Olympic Committee and in charge of Iranian Olympic Team for 1968 Mexico City Games and 1972 Munich Games in Germany. Rahnavardi died on 4 September 2023, at the age of 96.
