= Hermann Dodojacek =

Austrian weightlifter

Personal information
- Nationality: Austrian
- Born: 5 August 1938 (age 86); Lassee, Austria

Sport
- Sport: Weightlifting

Hermann Dodojacek (born 5 August 1938) is an Austrian weightlifter. He competed in the men's featherweight event at the 1960 Summer Olympics.
