= Johan Runge =

Danish weightlifter (1924–2005)

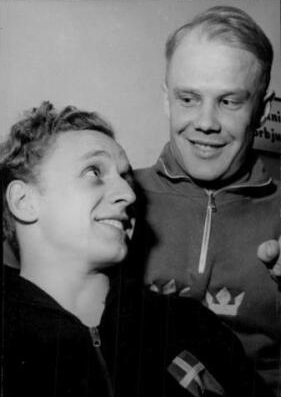
- Runge (left) with Arvid Andersson in 1950

Personal information
- Nationality: Danish
- Born: 12 June 1924 Kongens Lyngby, Denmark
- Died: 4 August 2005 (aged 81) Ballerup, Denmark

Sport
- Sport: Weightlifting
- Club: AK DAN, Ballerup
Medal record
Representing Denmark
World Weightlifting Championships
| Silver medal – second place | 1949 Scheveningen | -60 kg |
| Silver medal – second place | 1951 Milan | -60 kg |
European Weightlifting Championships
| Gold medal – first place | 1949 The Hague | -60 kg |
| Gold medal – first place | 1951 Milan | -60 kg |

Michael Johan Runge (12 June 1924 – 4 August 2005) was a Danish weightlifter. Competing as featherweight he won the European title in 1949 and 1951; placing second at the world championships in both years. Runge finished seventh at the 1948 and 1952 Summer Olympics.
