= Eino Mäkinen =

Finnish weightlifter (1926–2014)

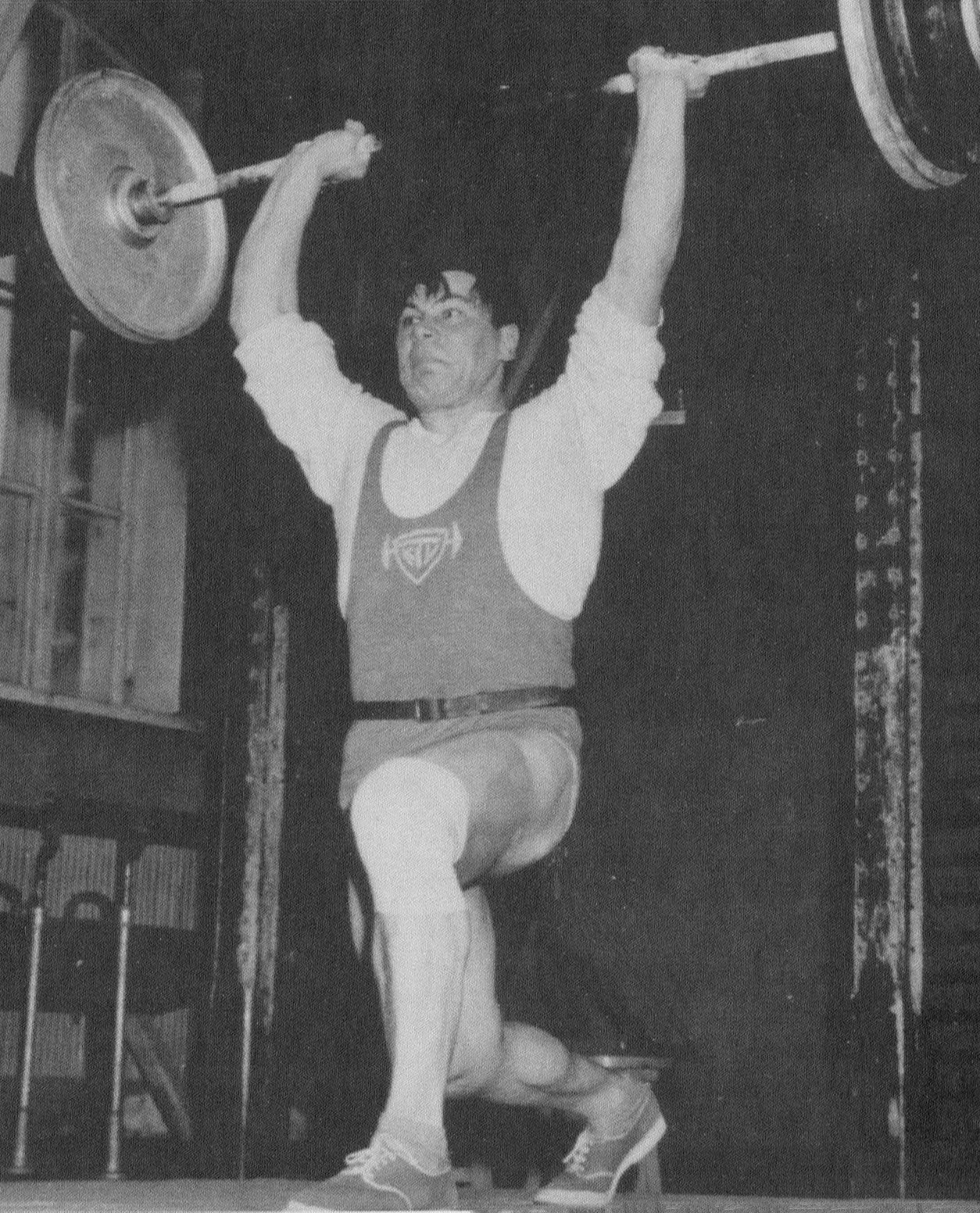

Personal information
- Born: 13 June 1926 Kuru, Finland
- Died: 13 August 2014 (aged 88) Tampere, Finland
- Height: 183 cm (6 ft 0 in)
- Weight: 100–113 kg (220–249 lb)

Sport
- Sport: Weightlifting
Medal record
Representing Finland
World Weightlifting Championships
Bronze medal – third place	1955 Munich	+90 kg
Bronze medal – third place	1961 Vienna	+90 kg
European Weightlifting Championships
Silver medal – second place	1954 Vienna	+90 kg
Gold medal – first place	1955 Munich	+90 kg
Silver medal – second place	1957 Katowice	+90 kg
Bronze medal – third place	1959 Warsaw	+90 kg
Silver medal – second place	1961 Vienna	+90 kg

Eino Matias Mäkinen (13 June 1926 – 13 August 2014) was a Finnish heavyweight weightlifter. He won two bronze medals at the world championships in 1955 and 1961 and five medals at the European championships in 1954–1961, including a gold in 1955. He competed at the 1952, 1956, 1960 and 1964 Olympics with the best result of fifth place in 1956 and 1960.
