= Ingemar Franzén =

Swedish weightlifter (1927–1985)

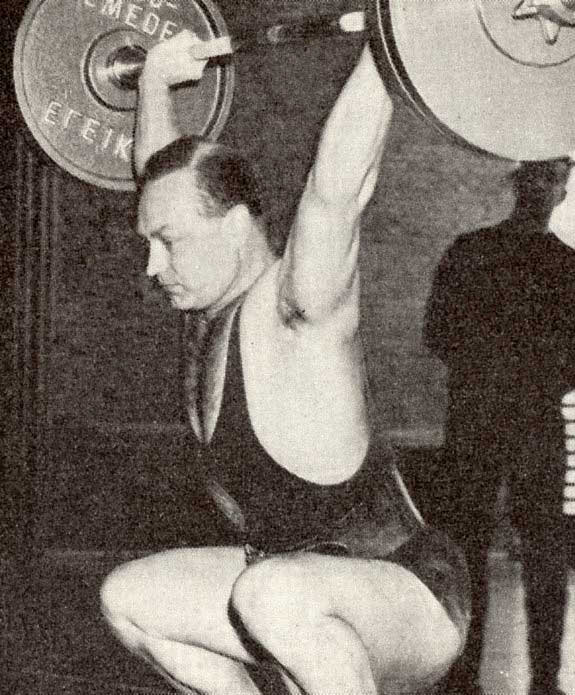

Personal information
- Born: 3 May 1927 Älmeboda, Tingsryd, Sweden
- Died: 9 February 1985 (aged 57) Upplands Väsby, Sweden

Sport
- Sport: Weightlifting
- Club: Södertälje AK
Medal record
Representing Sweden
World Weightlifting Championships
Bronze medal – third place	1955 Munich	-75 kg
European Weightlifting Championships
Bronze medal – third place	1954 Vienna	-75 kg
Silver medal – second place	1955 Munich	-75 kg

Rune Ingemar Hubert Franzén (3 May 1927 – 9 February 1985) was a Swedish middleweight weightlifter who won three medals at the world and European Championships in 1954–55. He competed at the 1956 Summer Olympics, but failed to complete the press event.
