= Lim Jose-ning =

Taiwanese weightlifter

Personal information
- Nationality: Taiwanese
- Born: June 1934 (age 90)

Sport
- Sport: Weightlifting

Lim Jose-ning (born June 1934) is a Taiwanese weightlifter. He competed in the men's featherweight event at the 1956 Summer Olympics.
