= Alfonso Fiorentino =

Argentine weightlifter

Personal information
- Nationality: Argentine
- Born: 1924
- Died: 22 June 2007 (aged 82–83)

Sport
- Sport: Weightlifting

Alfonso Fiorentino (1924 – 22 June 2007) was an Argentine weightlifter. He competed in the men's featherweight event at the 1948 Summer Olympics.
