= Juan Cortéz =

Mexican footballer (born 2005)

Personal information
- Full name: Juan Carlos Cortéz Vásquez
- Date of birth: 3 April 2005 (age 21)
- Place of birth: Hermosillo, Mexico
- Height: 1.73 m (5 ft 8 in)
- Position: Winger

Team information
- Current team: Sevilla Atlético
- Number: 21

Youth career
- 2023–2024: Club Necaxa
- 2024: Sevilla FC

Senior career*
Years	Team	Apps	(Gls)
2021–2022	Cimarrones de Sonora	4	(0)
2024–	Sevilla Atlético	8	(1)
- * Club domestic league appearances and goals as of 31 May 2026

Juan Carlos Cortéz Vásquez (born 3 April 2005) is a Mexican professional footballer who plays as a winger for Sevilla Atlético.

== Early life ==
Cortéz was born on 3 April 2005. Born in Hermosillo, Mexico, he is a native of the city.

== Career ==
Cortéz started his career with Mexican side Cimarrones de Sonora, where he made four league appearances and scored zero goals. On 23 September 2021, he debuted for the club during a 2–1 away win over Club Jaiba Brava in the league, becoming the youngest player to play in the Mexican second tier at the age of sixteen.

Ahead of the 2023–24 season, he joined the youth academy of Mexican side Club Necaxa. In 2024, he joined the youth academy of Spanish side Sevilla in La Liga and was promoted to the club's reserve team the same year. Mexican newspaper Récord wrote in 2024 that "during the 2023–24 season, the Mexican was a key player in the U19s winning the league and reaching the final four of the Champions Cup".

== Style of play ==
Cortéz plays as a winger. Right-footed, he is known for his speed, versatility, and dribbling ability.
