= Hans Friedrich (politician, born 1917) =

German politician

Member of the Bundestag
- In office 7 September 1949 – 7 September 1953

Personal details
- Born: 2 February 1917 Carlsruhe / Oberschlesien
- Died: 25 June 1998 (aged 81)
- Party: FDP

Hans Friedrich (2 February 1917 – 25 June 1998) was a German politician of the Free Democratic Party (FDP) and former member of the German Bundestag.

== Life ==
In the 1949 federal elections he was elected to the first German Bundestag on the Hessian state list of the FDP.

== Literature ==
Herbst, Ludolf; Jahn, Bruno (2002). Vierhaus, Rudolf (ed.). Biographisches Handbuch der Mitglieder des Deutschen Bundestages. 1949–2002 [Biographical Handbook of the Members of the German Bundestag. 1949–2002] (in German). München: De Gruyter - De Gruyter Saur. p. 1715. ISBN 978-3-11-184511-1.
