= Robert Allart =

Belgian weightlifter (1913–1997)

Personal information
- Full name: Robert Philippe Marie Allart
- Born: 29 November 1913 Laeken, Belgium
- Died: 29 October 1997 (aged 83) Liège, Belgium

Sport
- Country: Belgium
- Sport: Weightlifting
- Weight class: +82.5 kg
- Team: National team
Medal record
Men's Weightlifting
Representing Belgium
World Championships
Bronze medal – third place	1949 Scheveningen	+82.5 kg
- Updated on 8 October 2016

Robert Philippe Marie Allart (29 November 1913 – 29 October 1997) was a Belgian male weightlifter who competed in the heavyweight class and represented Belgium at international competitions. He was born in Laeken. He won the bronze medal at the 1949 World Weightlifting Championships in the +82.5 kg category. He participated at the 1948 Summer Olympics in the +82.5 kg event finishing seventh and at the 1952 Summer Olympics. He won the silver medal at the 1949 European Championships in the Unlimited class (387.5 kg) Allart died in Liège on 29 October 1997, at the age of 83.
