= Hosni Abbas =

Egyptian weightlifter

Personal information
- Nationality: Egyptian
- Born: 15 July 1932; Cairo, Egypt
- Weight: 60 kg (130 lb)

Sport
- Sport: Weightlifting

Hosni Mohamed Abbas (born 15 July 1932, date of death unknown, prior to 2013) was an Egyptian weightlifter. He competed in the 1960 and 1964 Summer Olympics.
