= Kiril Georgiev (weightlifter) =

Bulgarian weightlifter

Personal information
- Nationality: Bulgarian
- Born: 18 July 1936 (age 88); Varna, Bulgaria

Sport
- Sport: Weightlifting

Kiril Georgiev (born 18 July 1936) is a Bulgarian weightlifter. He competed in the men's featherweight event at the 1960 Summer Olympics.
