= Koen Van Langendonck =

Belgian footballer

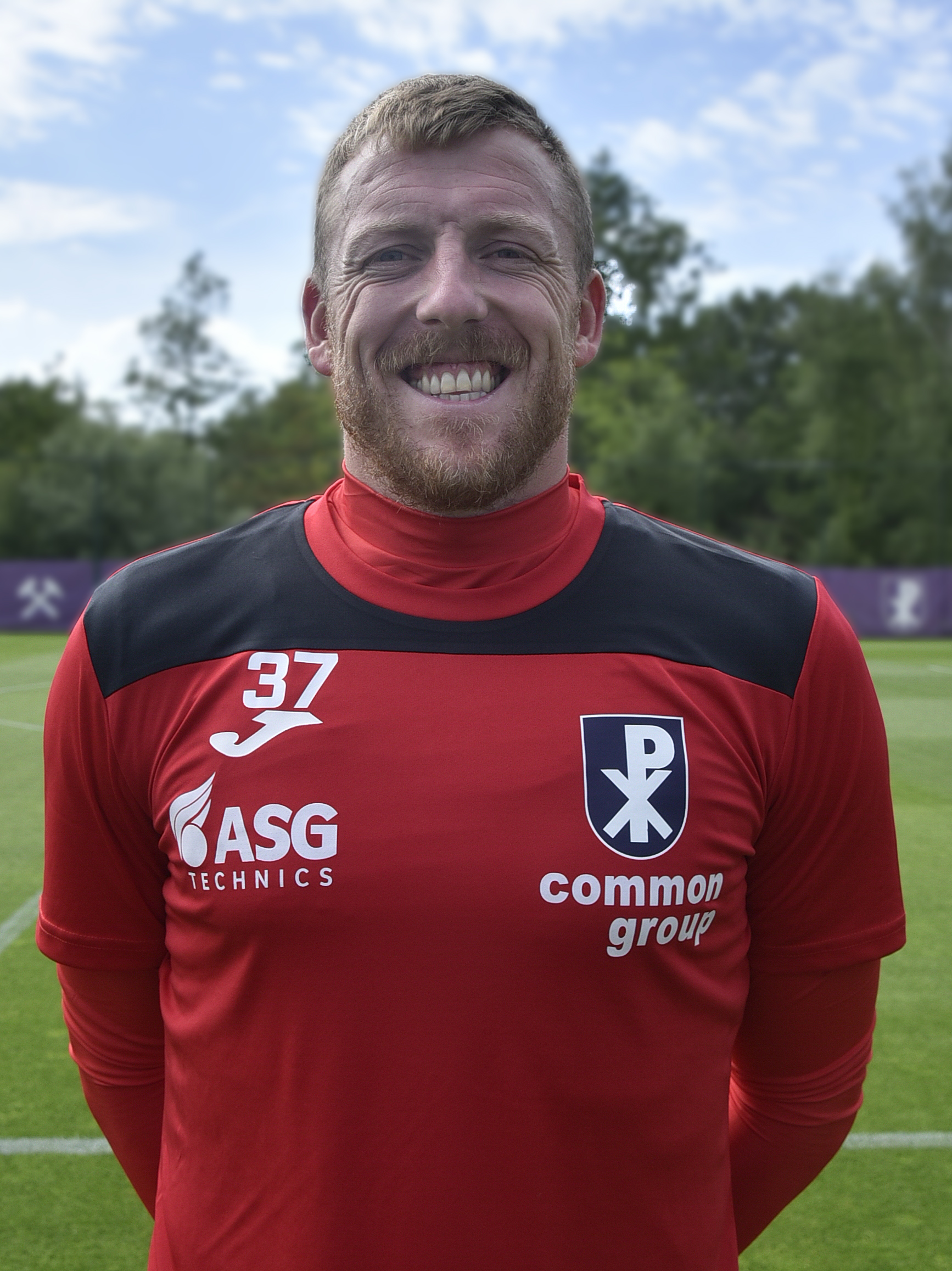

Personal information
- Date of birth: 9 June 1989 (age 37)
- Place of birth: Neerpelt, Belgium
- Height: 1.89 m (6 ft 2 in)
- Position: Goalkeeper

Team information
- Current team: Patro Eisden

Senior career*
Years	Team	Apps	(Gls)
2010–2012	Bocholt	63	(0)
2012–2013	Beerschot	10	(0)
2013–2026	Westerlo	208	(0)
2026–	Patro Eisden	0	(0)
- * Club domestic league appearances and goals as of 15 August 2026

Koen Van Langendonck (born 9 June 1989) is a Belgian professional footballer who plays as a goalkeeper for Challenger Pro League club Patro Eisden.

== Career ==
Prior to the 2022–23 season, Van Langendonck signed a contract extension to keep him with K.V.C. Westerlo through the end of the 2023–24 season.

== Honours ==
Westerlo

- Belgian First Division B: 2021–22

== Career statistics ==
As of match played 24 May 2025

Appearances and goals by club, season and competition
Club	Season	League			Cup		Continental		Other		Total	
Club	Season	Division	Apps	Goals	Apps	Goals	Apps	Goals	Apps	Goals	Apps	Goals
Beerschot	2012–13	Belgian Pro League	10	0	1	0	—		—		11	0
Westerlo	2013–14	Belgian Second Division	34	0	4	0	—		—		38	0
Westerlo	2014–15	Belgian Pro League	33	0	0	0	—		—		33	0
Westerlo	2015–16	Belgian Pro League	29	0	2	0	—		—		31	0
Westerlo	2016–17	Belgian First Division A	28	0	0	0	—		—		28	0
Westerlo	2017–18	Challenger Pro League	23	0	0	0	—		—		23	0
Westerlo	2018–19	Challenger Pro League	27	0	0	0	—		9	0	36	0
Westerlo	2019–20	Challenger Pro League	6	0	2	0	—		—		8	0
Westerlo	2020–21	Challenger Pro League	5	0	1	0	—		—		6	0
Westerlo	2021–22	Challenger Pro League	2	0	3	0	—		—		5	0
Westerlo	2022–23	Belgian Pro League	0	0	0	0	—		0	0	0	0
Westerlo	2023–24	Belgian Pro League	1	0	0	0	—		—		1	0
Westerlo	2024–25	Belgian Pro League	11	0	2	0	—		—		13	0
Westerlo	Total		199	0	14	0	—		9	0	222	0
Career total			209	0	15	0	0	0	9	0	233	0
