= José Luis Izquierdo =

Spanish weightlifter

Personal information
- Nationality: Spanish
- Born: 11 August 1933 (age 91); Toledo, Spain

Sport
- Sport: Weightlifting

José Luis Izquierdo (born 11 August 1933) is a Spanish weightlifter. He competed in the men's featherweight event at the 1960 Summer Olympics.
