= Moustafa El-Shalakani =

Egyptian weightlifter

Personal information
- Nationality: Egyptian
- Born: 1933 (age 91–92); Beni Suef, Egypt

Sport
- Sport: Weightlifting

Moustafa El-Shalakani (born 1933) is an Egyptian weightlifter. He competed in the men's featherweight event at the 1960 Summer Olympics.
