= Constant Allart =

French politician

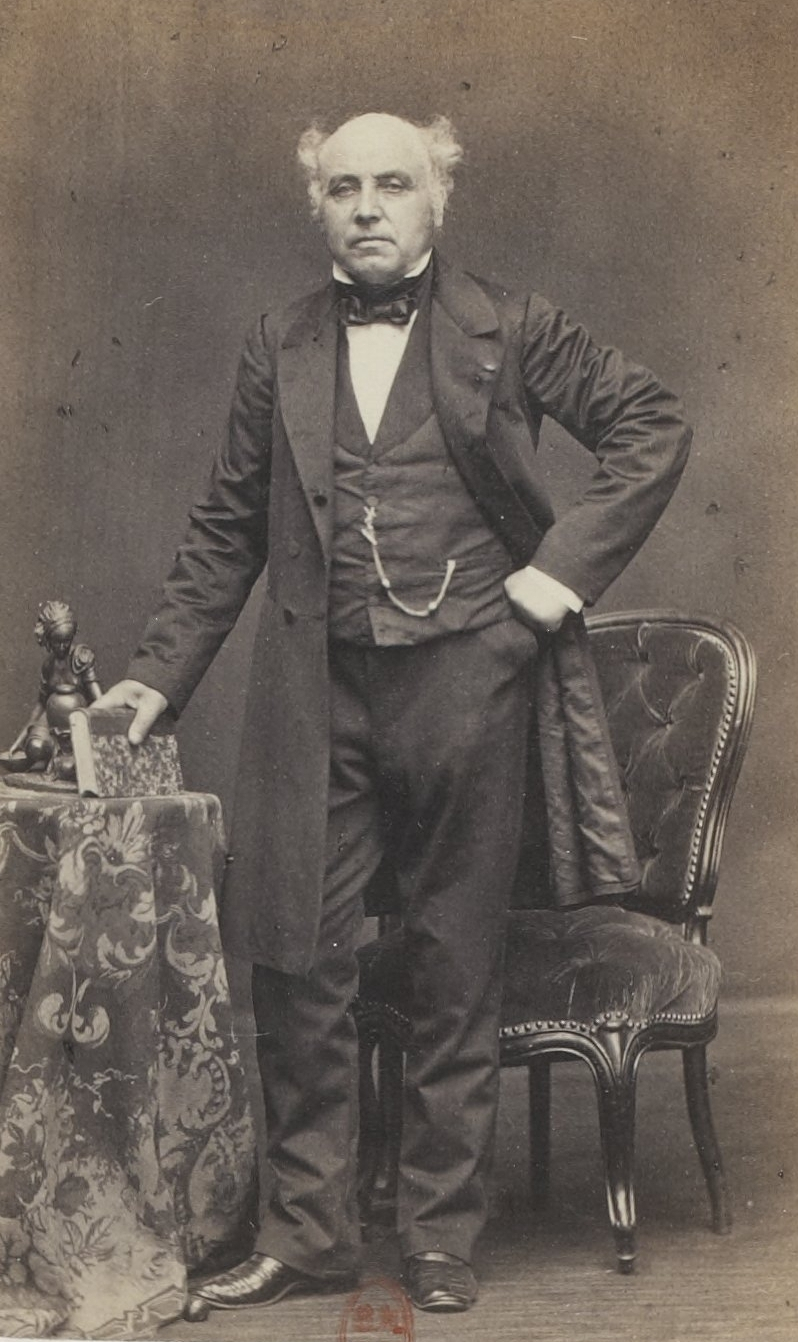
- Born: 2 March 1796; Tugny, Aisne, France
- Died: 13 September 1861 (aged 65); Amiens, Somme, France
- Occupation: Politician

Constant Allart (2 March 1796 – 13 September 1861) was a French politician. He served as a member of the National Constituent Assembly from 1848 to 1849, and the Corps législatif from 1852 to 1861, representing Somme. He also served as the mayor of Amiens from 1851 to 1860.
