= Gil Gunthorpe =

Australian cricketer

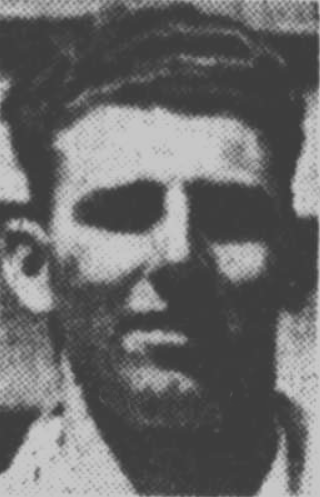

Personal information
- Born: 9 August 1910; Mount Morgan, Queensland, Australia
- Died: 3 June 1998 (aged 87); Casino, New South Wales, Australia
- Source: Cricinfo, 3 October 2020

Gil Gunthorpe (9 August 1910 – 3 June 1998) was an Australian cricketer. He played in two first-class matches for Queensland between 1935 and 1937.

== See also ==
- List of Queensland first-class cricketers
