= Thierry Salmon =

Belgian theatre director and stage actor

- Born: 27 March 1957; Brussels, Belgium
- Died: 15 June 1998 (aged 41); Strasbourg, France
- Occupation(s): theatre director, actor
- Years active: 1978–1998

Thierry Salmon (27 March 1957 – 15 June 1998) was a Belgian theatre director and stage actor.

== Biography ==
He was born in Brussels, Belgium, and he studied at drama art in Royal Conservatory of Brussels. Thierry Salmon founded the collective theatre L'Ymagier singuiler in 1979 and created his first piece later in the same year Rimbaud 1871–1873. Two years later, in 1981, his company moved into a barracks which was abandoned. In 1988, his production of The Trojan Women by Euripides was presented at the including festivals Gibellina and Festival d'Avignon and he won the Ève du Théâtre in 1990. He died in an accident, aged 41, on 15 June 1998.

== Theatre works ==
- Orphée (1978)
- Rimbaud 1871–1873 (1979) based on the collective novel Les Rougon-Macquart by Émile Zola
- Fastes/Foules (1983)
- A. da Agatha (1986), based on the novel Agatha by Marguerite Duras
- La Signorina Else (1987), based on the play by Arthur Schnitzler
- The Trojan Women based on the play by Euripides
- Demons (1992), based on the novel by Fyodor Dostoyevsky
- Faustæ tabulæ, based on the novel by Paul Auster
- Projet Thémiscyre based on the trilogy by Heinrich von Kleist
  - L'assalt al cielo (1996)
  - Thémiscyre 2 — Come vittime infiorite al macello (1997)
  - Thémiscyre 3 — Le vostre madri sono state piu solerti (1997)
