= Bart Van Lancker =

Belgian football coach (1973–2021)

Personal information
- Date of birth: 17 March 1973
- Place of birth: Zottegem, Belgium
- Date of death: 23 June 2021 (aged 48)

Managerial career
- Years: Team
- 2012–2013: Beerschot (assistant)
- 2013–2014: Cercle Brugge (assistant)
- 2016: Deinze (assistant)
- 2016–2017: Kortrijk
- 2017: Kortrijk (assistant)
- 2017–2018: Beerschot Wilrijk (physical coach)
- 2018–2019: Sint-Truiden (physical coach)
- 2020–2021: OH Leuven (physical coach)

Bart Van Lancker (17 March 1973 – 23 June 2021) was a Belgian professional football coach and holder of a PRO LICENSE diploma who mainly worked as assistant manager and physical coach in Belgium, who also managed Kortrijk for one season.

== Managerial career ==
Van Lancker was appointed the manager of Kortrijk. In August 2016, Van Lancker was appointed head coach of K.V. Kortrijk because Karim Belhocine, who had been leading the team, did not hold the UEFA Pro Licence required for the position. Belhocine was given the title of sporting director of football affairs, while Van Lancker became the club's officially designated head coach. The arrangement allowed Kortrijk to meet the Belgian football authorities' coaching qualification requirements.Previously he was the assistant coach at KSV Cercle Brugge and KMSK Deinze. In his last years he was physical coach in KFCO Beerschot Wilrijk and STVV.
