= Sebastiano Mannironi =

Italian weightlifter (1930–2015)

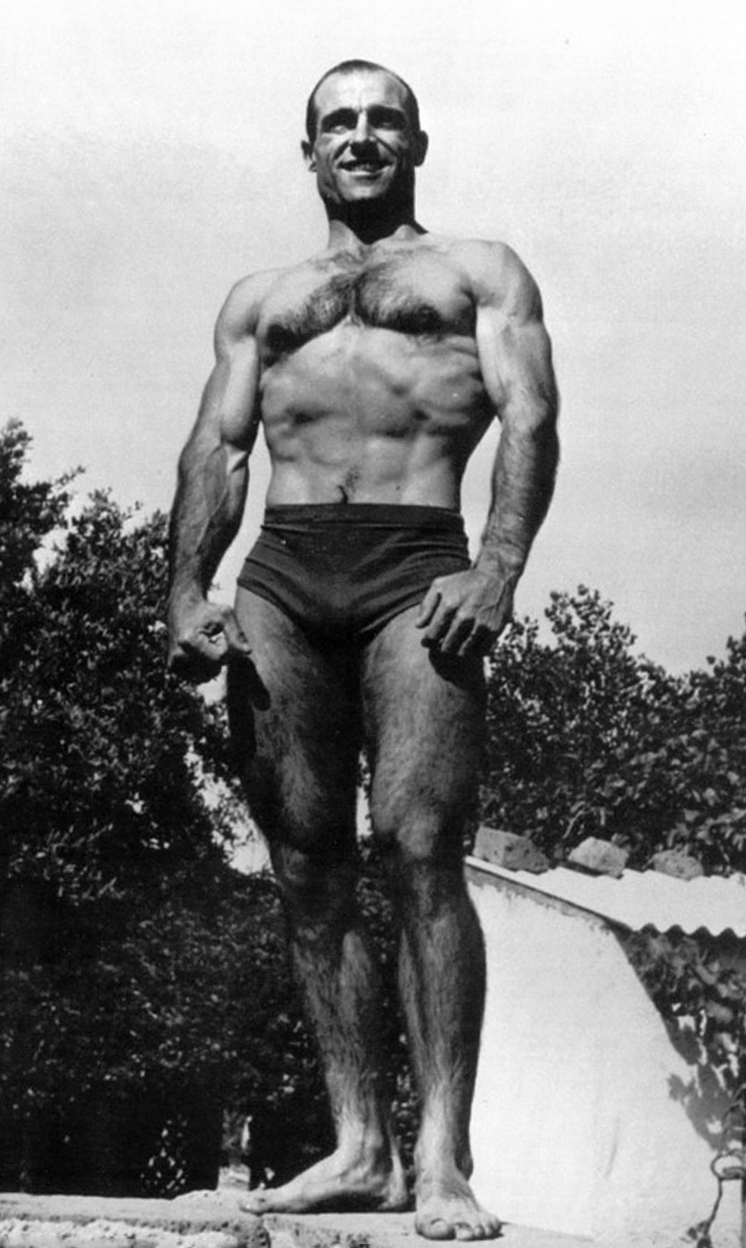

Personal information
- Born: 22 July 1930 Nuoro, Italy
- Died: 12 June 2015 (aged 84) Bracciano, Italy
- Height: 1.62 m (5 ft 4 in)
- Weight: 59–60 kg (130–132 lb)

Sport
- Sport: Weightlifting
- Club: Polisportiva Gennargentu, Nuoro; G.S. Fiamme Oro, Roma
Medal record
Representing Italy
Bronze medal – third place	1960 Rome	featherweight
World Championships
Silver medal – second place	1957 Teheran	-60 kg
Bronze medal – third place	1958 Stockholm	-60 kg
Bronze medal – third place	1959 Warsaw	-60 kg
Silver medal – second place	1961 Vienna	-60 kg

Sebastiano Mannironi (22 July 1930 – 12 June 2015) was an Italian featherweight weightlifter who competed at the 1956, 1960 and 1964 Summer Olympics; he won a bronze medal in 1960 and finished fifth in 1964. Between 1953 and 1966 Mannironi won 14 medals at European and World Championships, including a gold at the 1961 European Championships, and set one world record, in the snatch in 1958.
