= Juan Cortés (footballer) =

Chilean footballer

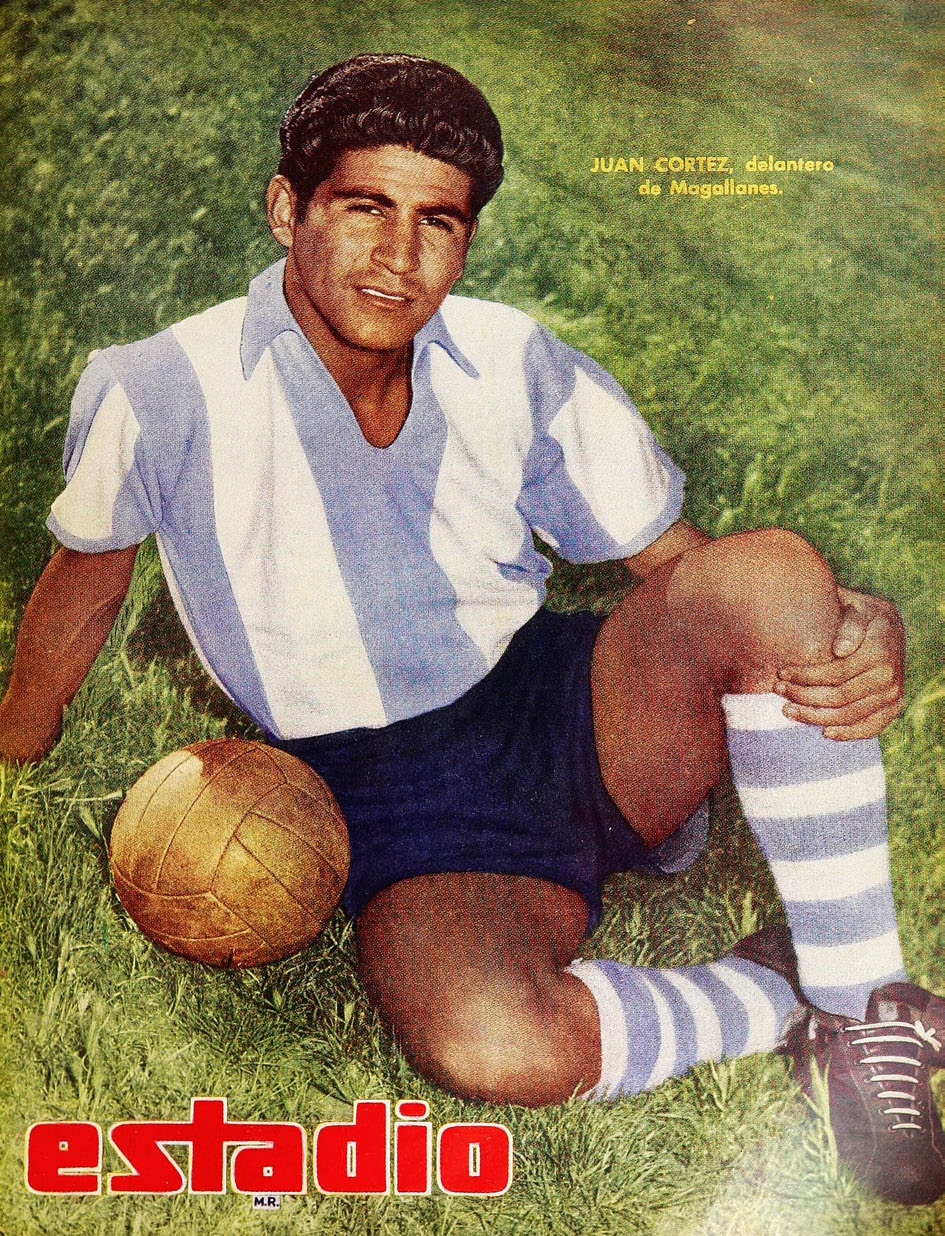

Personal information
- Full name: Juan Cortés Contreras
- Date of birth: 18 June 1938
- Place of birth: Santiago, Chile
- Date of death: 28 June 1998 (aged 60)
- Place of death: Lima, Peru
- Height: 1.78 m (5 ft 10 in)
- Position: Attacking midfielder

Senior career*
Years	Team	Apps	(Gls)
1956–1960	Magallanes		
1961–1962	Palestino	37	(9)
1962	→ Universidad de Chile (loan)	0	(0)
1963–1968	Rangers	138	(17)
1969	Unión Española	5	(1)
1971–1972	ADO Callao		
1973	Carmen Mora		
1973–1974	Juventud Italiana		

International career
1960–1966	Chile B		
- * Club domestic league appearances and goals

Juan Cortés Contreras (18 June 1938 – 28 June 1998) was a Chilean footballer who played as an attacking midfielder for clubs in Chile and abroad.

== Career ==
Born in Santiago, Chile, Cortés began his professional career with Magallanes in September 1956. In the late 1950s, he and his fellows Héctor Torres and Ricardo Cabrera made up a well remembered attacking trident.

Next, he spent two seasons with Palestino (1961–62), playing as a centre forward, and made appearances for Universidad de Chile in international friendlies.

He switched to Rangers de Talca in 1963, staying with them until 1968.

A historical player of Rangers during a successful stint, the club reached the fourth, the fifth and the third place of the league in 1963, 1964 and 1965, respectively. He was selected as the best player in the club history at the centenary (2002).

After playing for Unión Española in 1969, the next year he moved to Peru. Following a year not playing, he played for Atlético Deportivo Olímpico (ADO Callao) in 1971 and 1972.

His last clubs were the Ecuadorian clubs Carmen Mora de Encalada and Juventud Italiana in 1973 and 1974, respectively.

== International career ==
Cortés made an appearance for the Chile national B-team led by Fernando Riera in 1960, with views to the 1962 FIFA World Cup, alongside players such as Carlos Contreras and Eladio Rojas. He also played in a 3–0 win against Deportes Concepción Unido in March 1966, alongside players such as Elías Figueroa and Honorino Landa, led by Hugo Tassara, as wells as he took part in the Luis Álamos' coaching process with views to the 1966 FIFA World Cup.

== Style of play ==
Initially a skillful attacking midfielder that used to make assists, he turned into a central midfielder. In his stint with Palestino, he operated as a centre forward and also as a goalkeeper for a match. As playing skills, he had a strong shot and a very well header.

== Personal life ==
He was known by his party attitude.

As a player of Unión Española, he worked in the shoes factory of Abel Alonso, a club leader. In Lima, he did arts and crafts and served as football coach for children.

He died of a heart attack in Lima, Peru, on 18 June 1998 and was laid to rest in Los Jardines de la Paz cemetery, La Molina.

His wife, Nilda Palacios, has also been honored by Rangers de Talca.
