= Daniel Pon Mony =

Indian weightlifter

Personal information
- Nationality: Indian
- Born: 12 August 1921; Putukudi Eruppu, Kanyakumari, British India

Sport
- Sport: Weightlifting

Daniel Pon Mony (born 12 August 1921) was an Indian weightlifter. He competed at the 1948 Summer Olympics and the 1952 Summer Olympics.
