= Rodrigo del Rosario =

Filipino weightlifter (1917–2009)

Personal information
- Nationality: Filipino
- Born: 11 June 1917
- Died: 10 October 2009 (aged 92)
- Home town: Cabangan, Zambales

Sport
- Sport: Weightlifting

Achievements and titles
- Personal best: 60 kg press: 105 kg (1952, OR)

Rodrigo del Rosario (11 June 1917 – 10 October 2009) was a Filipino weightlifter. He competed at the 1948 Summer Olympics, the 1952 Summer Olympics and the 1956 Summer Olympics.

== Career ==
Hailing from Cabangan, Zambales, del Rosario started as a sprinter but shifted to weightlifting. Standing 1.62 meters (5 feet 4 inches) high, del Rosario first took part in the 1948 Olympic Games in London.

At the 1952 Summer Olympics, del Rosario set a world and Olympic record by lifting 105 kg in the military press portion of the men's 60 kg event surpassing Iran's Jafar Salmasi lift of 100 kg. He however did not medal. He took part in the 1956 Summer Olympics in Melbourne.

Del Rosario represented the Philippines at the 1970 World Weightlifting Championships in Ohio. He was awarded a gold medal after athletes who made heavier lifts were disqualified for doping.

== Later life and death ==
Del Rosario served as security officer for the Rizal Memorial Coliseum. He also became a wheelchair user in his latter years He died in October 2009.

== Personal life ==
His nephews Arturo and nephew Salvador also became Olympic weightlifters.
