= Aleksandar Janković =

Serbian footballer

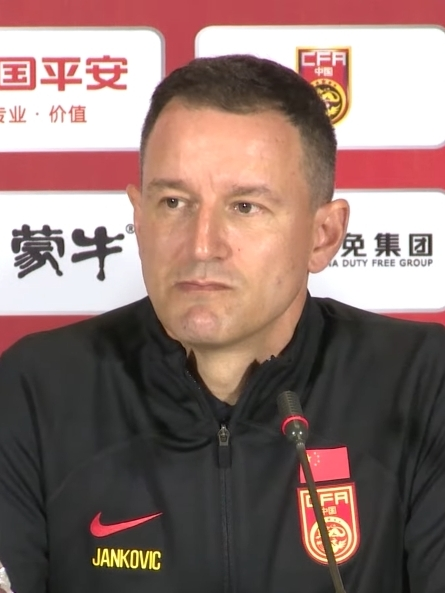
- Janković with China in 2023

Personal information
- Full name: Aleksandar Janković
- Date of birth: 6 May 1972 (age 54)
- Place of birth: Belgrade, SR Serbia, SFR Yugoslavia
- Height: 1.81 m (5 ft 11 in)
- Position: Midfielder

Youth career
- 1982–1991: Red Star Belgrade

Senior career*
Years	Team	Apps	(Gls)
1992	Bonnyrigg White Eagles	8	(0)
1992–1994	AS Cherbourg		
1994–1995	Pau FC		

Managerial career
- 2001: Red Star Belgrade (assistant)
- 2002–2003: Levski Sofia (assistant)
- 2003–2004: Red Star Belgrade (assistant)
- 2004–2005: Metalurh Donetsk (assistant)
- 2005: Lokeren (assistant)
- 2006: Lokomotiv Moscow (assistant)
- 2006–2007: Lokeren (assistant)
- 2007–2008: Red Star Belgrade
- 2009: Lokeren
- 2010–2013: Serbia U21
- 2012–2013: Red Star Belgrade
- 2014–2016: Mechelen
- 2016–2017: Standard Liège
- 2017–2018: Mechelen
- 2018–2019: China U19 B
- 2019–2021: China U20
- 2021–2023: China U23
- 2023–2024: China
- * Club domestic league appearances and goals

Aleksandar Janković (Serbian Cyrillic: Александар Јанковић; born 6 May 1972) is a Serbian football coach and former player who was most recently the manager of the China national football team.

== Playing career ==
He played football professionally for his hometown club Red Star Belgrade and FK Napredak Kruševac in Serbia, Bonnyrigg White Eagles Football Club (under the name of Sasha Jankovic) in Australia, AS Cherbourg Football and Pau FC in France, before ending his playing career aged 28, due to a knee injury.

== Coaching career ==
While playing at Pau FC, Janković met his compatriot, coach Slavoljub Muslin who would turn out to be an important figure for his eventual venture into coaching. Following the injury that forced him to end his playing career, Janković came into the Red Star organization (club coached by Muslin at the time) in an adviser-scout role during the early 2000. At the end of the 2000–01 season that saw Red Star win another league title (after winning the league and cup double the previous season), Ratko Dostanić, Muslin's assistant, took the head coaching job at FK Obilić, and Muslin offered the vacated place to Janković who thus became Red Star's assistant coach on 5 July 2001 at the age of 29.

However, Janković wouldn't get to stay at his new job for long as very early into the 2001–02 season Muslin abruptly resigned as head coach after the 2001–02 UEFA Champions League qualifying first leg loss to Bayer Leverkusen and Janković left as well.

In March 2002, Muslin resurfaced as head coach at Levski Sofia and Janković followed him there to be his assistant. In April 2003, Muslin got the sack and Janković left again as well.

Couple of months later, during the summer 2003 offseason, the duo returned to their old stomping grounds at Red Star. After Zoran Filipović got sacked, Muslin got the head coaching job, and, Janković, by now his established second-in-command, was on his way to Belgrade as well.

From there Janković followed Muslin to Metalurh Donetsk, Lokeren, Lokomotiv Moscow, and back to Lokeren, respectively.

From July 2007, he has been an advance scout in Red Star, and his duties mainly included scouting opponents' players and tactics.

=== Red Star Belgrade ===
After Milorad Kosanović's resignation on 9 November 2007, Janković was appointed as new head coach of Red Star. Yet, after failing to earn a title in the national championship or in the national cup, he was dismissed on 11 June 2008, to be replaced by Zdeněk Zeman.

Janković has since been appointed head of the Red Star Belgrade Football School.

=== Lokeren ===
On 6 April 2009 he was named the new SC Lokeren coach, the Serbian signed him until June 2010 and replaced Georges Leekens. On 25 October 2009 Janković was fired after a series of bad results.

=== China ===
He was appointed coach of the China Olympic team on 2021, but China did not take any major competition save for the friendly Dubai Cup, where China won one and lost two other matches. He was named the U-23 team coach for the 2022 Asian Games.

He was named interim coach of the China senior team for the 2022 EAFF E-1 Football Championship held in Japan. During the tournament, with most of the squad made up of just under-23 players, China only registered a win and a goal, both against Hong Kong in a 1–0 win by Tan Long's. However, his China did gain an encouraging goalless draw against Japan away, which was the first time in 12 years that China did not lose to Japan in Japanese soil.

On 24 February 2023, he was appointed new head coach of China. At the 2023 AFC Asian Cup, he led China to its worst ever performance in their history, failing to score a single goal and won only two points at the group stages. Following Syria's 1–0 win over India, China were eliminated from the competition. Janković received significant criticism for his strategy, his choice in the selection, and his questionable options, which contributed to China's inability to score a single goal in the tournament and resulted in their eventual elimination. The same day, it was reported that he was fired from the position as coach of China, and had returned to his homeland for vacation, although the final decision remained to be seen. It was later confirmed that Janković's contract would not be extended following the failure in Qatar on 31 January 2024, and he was dismissed from the position.

=== Manager ===
As of match played 22 January 2024

Managerial record by team and tenure
Team	From	To	Record				
Team	From	To	P	W	D	L	Win %
Red Star Belgrade	November 2007	June 2008	24	16	6	2	66.67
SC Lokeren	April 2009	October 2009	17	5	2	10	29.41
Serbia U21	November 2010	December 2012	15	7	4	4	46.67
Red Star Belgrade	August 2012	March 2013	23	14	2	7	60.87
Mechelen	May 2014	September 2016	88	35	23	30	39.77
Standard Liège	September 2016	April 2017	35	9	16	10	25.71
Mechelen	November 2017	January 2018	10	3	1	6	30.00
China U20	January 2019	December 2020	5	2	2	1	40.00
China U23	January 2022	February 2023	2	1	0	1	50.00
China	February 2023	January 2024	17	5	5	7	29.41
Total			236	97	61	78	41.10

== Personal life ==
Aleksandar is married and has two children. His father is a notable Serbian sports journalist Dobrivoje "Bobi" Janković (1937–2022). He has been dubbed as "Serbian Mourinho" due to Dejan Andjus criticism about him.
