= Arvid Andersson (weightlifter) =

Swedish weightlifter (1919–2011)

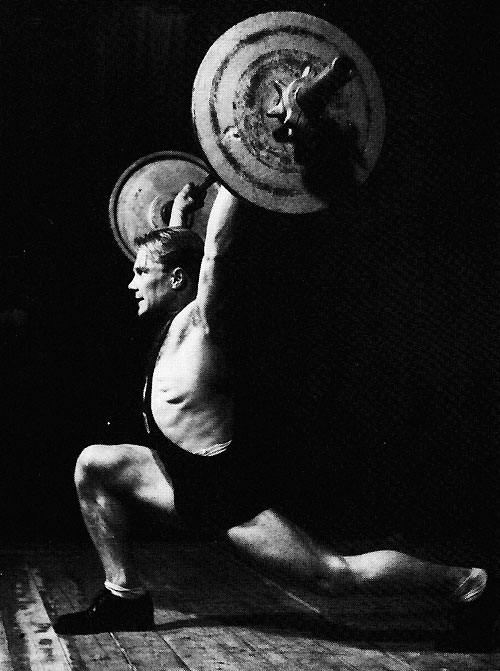
- Arvid Andersson by the mid 1940s

Personal information
- Full name: Olov Arvid Andersson
- Born: 19 May 1919 Sunne, Sweden
- Died: 20 September 2011 (aged 92) Kristinehamn, Sweden

Sport
- Sport: Weightlifting
Medal record
Men's weightlifting
Representing Sweden
European Weightlifting Championships
Gold medal – first place	1947 Helsinki	Featherweight
Gold medal – first place	1949 The Hague	Lightweight
World Weightlifting Championships
Gold medal – first place	1946 Paris	Featherweight
Bronze medal – third place	1949 Scheveningen	Lightweight

Olov Arvid Andersson (19 May 1919 – 20 September 2011) was a Swedish weightlifter who competed at two editions of the summer Olympic Games. At the 1948 Summer Olympics in London he finished 13th in a field of 23 competitors in the men's featherweight event and 12th among 24 participants in the lightweight division at the 1952 Summer Olympics in Helsinki. Born in Sunne, Sweden, he was a member of Kristinehamns ABK and won gold medals at the 1947 and 1949 editions of the European Weightlifting Championships in the feather and lightweight categories respectively. He captured an additional gold medal at the 1946 World Weightlifting Championships in the featherweight tournament and a bronze medal at the 1949 edition in the lightweight category. He was awarded the 1946 Svenska Dagbladet Gold Medal for his victory at the World Championships. He died on 20 September 2011 in Kristinehamn at the age of 92.
