= Max Heral =

French weightlifter (1926–2003)

Personal information
- Nationality: French
- Born: 22 September 1926; Montpellier, France
- Died: 26 April 2003 (aged 76)

Sport
- Sport: Weightlifting

Max Heral (22 September 1926 – 26 April 2003) was a French weightlifter. He competed at the 1948 Summer Olympics and the 1952 Summer Olympics.
