= Nikolay Saksonov =

Soviet weightlifter (1923–2011)

Personal information
- Born: 6 January 1923 Serga, Permsky Uyezd, Perm Governorate, Russian SFSR, Soviet Union
- Died: 2 November 2011 (aged 88) Elektrougli, Moscow, Russia
- Weight: 60 kg (130 lb)

Sport
- Sport: Weightlifting
- Club: Lokomotiv Sverdlovsk
Medal record
Representing the Soviet Union
Olympic Games
| Silver medal – second place | 1952 Helsinki | -60 kg |
World Championships
| Gold medal – first place | 1953 Stockholm | -60 kg |
European Championships
| Silver medal – second place | 1952 Helsinki | -60 kg |
| Gold medal – first place | 1953 Stockholm | -60 kg |

Nikolai Nikolaevich Saksonov (Russian: Никола́й Николáевич Саксóнов; 6 January 1923 – 2 November 2011) was a Russian weightlifter. He competed for the Soviet Union at the 1952 Olympics and won a silver medal in the featherweight division (−60 kg). The following year he won a world title in the same division. During his career Saksonov set nine world records: seven official records in the clean and jerk and two unofficial records in the total.

== Biography ==
In 1940–1941 Saksonov studied at naval and infantry military schools, and later fought as a sergeant in World War II. During a raid behind the front lines he captured an injured German combatant and brought him to the Soviet positions despite being wounded himself. For this feat he was awarded the Order of the Red Star. He took part in various other military operations, for which he was awarded the Order of the Patriotic War and the Medal of Bravery, among other medals.

After retiring from sport, in the 1960s Saksonov defended a PhD in medicine and later headed the Department of Athletics of the State Central Institute of Physical Culture.
