= Henri Colans =

Belgian weightlifter (1915–1998)

Personal information
- Full name: Henri Achille Colans
- Nationality: Belgian
- Born: 5 July 1915 Brussels, Belgium
- Died: 24 June 1998 (aged 82) Boussu, Belgium

Sport
- Sport: Weightlifting

Henri Achille Colans (5 July 1915 – 24 June 1998) was a Belgian weightlifter. He competed at the 1948 Summer Olympics and the 1952 Summer Olympics. Colans died in Boussu on 24 June 1998, at the age of 82.
