= Rafael Chimishkyan =

Soviet weightlifter (1929–2022)

Medal record

Men's Weightlifting

Representing Soviet Union

Olympic Games
Gold medal – first place	1952 Helsinki	-60 kg

World Championships
Silver medal – second place	1950 Paris	-56 kg
Silver medal – second place	1953 Stockholm	-60 kg
Gold medal – first place	1954 Vienna	-60 kg
Gold medal – first place	1955 Munich	-60 kg

European Championships
Gold medal – first place	1950 Paris	-56 kg
Gold medal – first place	1952 Helsinki	-60 kg
Silver medal – second place	1953 Stockholm	-60 kg
Gold medal – first place	1954 Vienna	-60 kg
Gold medal – first place	1955 Munich	-60 kg
Gold medal – first place	1956 Helsinki	-60 kg
Gold medal – first place	1957 Katowice	-60 kg

USSR Weightlifting Championships
Gold medal – first place	1949 Voronezh	-56 kg
Silver medal – second place	1950 Kharkiv	-60 kg
Gold medal – first place	1951 Kaunas	-60 kg
Silver medal – second place	1952 Ivanovo	-60 kg
Silver medal – second place	1953 Tallinn	-60 kg
Gold medal – first place	1954 Petrozavodsk	-60 kg
Gold medal – first place	1955 Minsk	-60 kg
Bronze medal – third place	1956 Moscow	-60 kg
Silver medal – second place	1957 Lviv	-60 kg
Silver medal – second place	1958 Stalino	-60 kg
Gold medal – first place	1960 Leningrad	-60 kg
Bronze medal – third place	1962 Tbilisi	-60 kg

Rafael Arkadyevich Chimishkyan (Georgian: რაფაელ ჩიმიშკიანი, Russian: Рафаэль Аркадьевич Чимишкян; 23 March 1929 – 25 September 2022) was a Georgian weightlifter who competed for the Soviet Union and Olympic, World, European and Soviet Champion. Chimishkyan was awarded the Honoured Master of Sports of the USSR title in 1952. He was an honorary citizen of Tbilisi.

== Biography ==
Chimishkyan was born in Tbilisi, Georgian SSR on 23 March 1929. He started weightlifting in 1946. In his first Soviet Championship in 1949, he won a gold medal at bantamweight (56 kg). In 1950, Chimishkyan won silver at the World Weightlifting Championships and gold at the European Weightlifting Championships and then switched to featherweight (60 kg). He first won a silver at the Soviet Championships that year in this new category. Chimishkyan became a two-time World Champion (1954 and 1955), six-time European Champion (1950, 1952, 1954–57) and five-time USSR Champion (1949, 1951, 1954, 1955, 1960).

Chimishkyan won an Olympic gold medal at the 1952 Summer Olympics in Helsinki. He is the second Soviet weightlifter to become an Olympic Champion. He was the last living Olympic Champion as well as even the last living medalist in Weightlifting from the 1952 Olympics. Chimishkyan set 10 world records during his career: three in the snatch, two in the clean and jerk and five in the total.
