= Mahmoud Fayad =

Egyptian weightlifter (1925–2002)

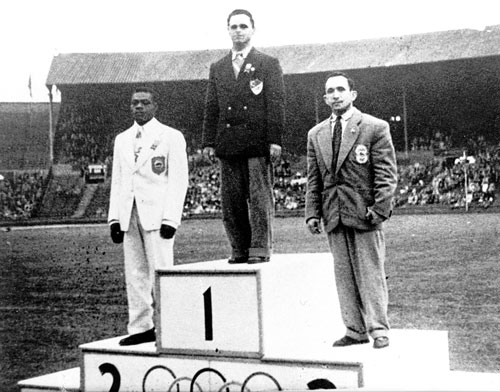
- Mahmoud Fayad at first place

Personal information
- Born: March 9, 1925 Alexandria, Egypt
- Died: December 18, 2002 (aged 77)
Medal record
Representing Egypt
Men's Weightlifting
Gold medal – first place	1948 London	-60 kg

Mahmoud Fayad (Egyptian Arabic: محمود فياض; March 9, 1925 – December 18, 2002) was an Egyptian Olympic champion weightlifter. He competed in the Featherweight (-60 kg) division weightlifting at the 1948 Summer Olympics in London. He won a gold medal for Egypt after lifting a record of 332.5 kg.

== See also ==
- List of Egyptians
