= Deaths in June 2007 =

The following is a list of notable deaths in June 2007.

Entries for each day are listed alphabetically by surname. A typical entry lists information in the following sequence:

- Name, age, country of citizenship at birth, subsequent country of citizenship (if applicable), reason for notability, cause of death (if known), and reference.

== June 2007 ==
=== 1 ===
- Warren M. Anderson, 91, American legislator, Temporary President and Majority Leader of the NY Senate (1973–1989).
- Jan Beneš, 71, Czech writer, translator, publicist and screenwriter, suicide.
- Kasma Booty, 75, Malaysian actress, pneumonia.
- Itzhak Ben David, 76, Israeli Olympic cyclist (1960).
- Sir John Gilmour, 3rd Baronet, 94, British Conservative MP for East Fife (1961–1979) and Lord Lieutenant of Fife (1980–1987).
- Eleanor Hadley, 90, American economist.
- Charles Johnson, 58, American basketball player (California Golden Bears, Golden State Warriors, Washington Bullets), cancer.
- Charles Kinkead, 93, Jamaican photojournalist, stroke.
- Pamela Low, 79, American flavorist who created the coating for Cap'n Crunch.
- Marly de Oliveira, 72, Brazilian poet, Prêmio Jabuti laureate (1998), multiple organ failure.
- Arn Shein, 78, American sports writer.
- Dave Smalley, 72, American coach of US Naval Academy men's and women's basketball teams, complications of cancer.
- Tony Thompson, 31, American lead vocalist of the R&B group Hi-Five, toxic inhalation of freon.

=== 2 ===
- Sandy Barr, 69, American professional wrestler, heart attack.
- Charles Evans, 81, American businessman and film producer (Showgirls), complications from pneumonia.
- Marion Francis Forst, 96, American oldest Roman Catholic bishop in the United States.
- Steve Gilliard, 42, American blogger, heart and kidney failure.
- Kentarō Haneda, 58, Japanese pianist, composer and arranger, liver cancer.
- Wolfgang Hilbig, 65, German author and poet.
- Huang Ju, 68, Chinese Vice Premier, Politburo Standing Committee member, former Mayor of Shanghai.
- Martin Meyerson, 84, American academic, President of Penn (1971–1982) and Chancellor of UC Berkeley.
- John Moriarty, 69, Irish poet and philosopher, cancer.

=== 3 ===
- Richard Attipoé, 50, Togolese politician, Minister of Youth and Sport, helicopter crash.
- Iván Darvas, 82, Hungarian actor.
- Ragheed Ganni, 35, Iraqi Chaldean Catholic priest, shot.
- Bruce Goldsmith, 71, American sailor.
- Earl Hogan, 87, American politician, U.S. Representative from Indiana (1959–1961).
- Jim Kelsey, 54, American Bishop of the Episcopal Diocese of Northern Michigan, automobile accident.
- Nelson Levy, 58, Tahitian founding head of Air Tahiti Nui, leading figure in French Polynesian tourism, heart attack.
- Leonard Nathan, 82, American poet, National Book Award nominee, UC Berkeley professor of rhetoric, Alzheimer's disease.
- Juan Antonio Arguelles Rius, 28, Spanish songwriter and programmer, traffic collision.

=== 4 ===
- Clete Boyer, 70, American baseball player (New York Yankees, Atlanta Braves) and coach, stroke.
- Tom Burns, 75, Australian politician, former Queensland opposition leader, Deputy Premier and Australian Labor Party national president.
- Lady Jeanne Campbell, 78, British journalist and aristocrat.
- Jim Clark, 84, American sheriff of Dallas County, Alabama who opposed voting rights in Selma, stroke and heart condition.
- Hallie Ford, 102, American timber entrepreneur and philanthropist.
- Bill France Jr., 74, American CEO of NASCAR (1972–2003), cancer.
- Wallace McIntosh, 87, British World War II air gunner.
- Sotiris Moustakas, 67, Greek Cypriot actor, cancer.
- Freddie Scott, 74, American singer ("Hey Girl"), heart attack.
- Craig L. Thomas, 74, American Senator from Wyoming since 1995, leukemia.

=== 5 ===
- Sam Baker, 76, American football player, complications of diabetes.
- Gert-Jan Dröge, 64, Dutch TV personality, lung cancer.
- Povel Ramel, 85, Swedish artist, singer, pianist, comedian, actor, author.

=== 6 ===
- Lila Irene Clerides, 85, Indian-born Cypriot actress and socialite, First Lady (1974, 1993–2003).
- Tony DeSantis, 93, American owner of Drury Lane Theatre, cancer.
- Enrique Fuentes Quintana, 82, Spanish economist and politician, Deputy Prime Minister (1977–1979).
- James Halliday, 89, British weightlifter and Olympian (1948, 1952).
- Larry Leon Hamlin, 58, American theater producer, founder of the National Black Theater Festival.
- Dave Hancock, 68, English footballer.
- James Howard Jarvis II, 70, American district judge (United States District Court for the Eastern District of Tennessee).
- Luke Sela, 64, Papua New Guinean journalist, editor of the PNG Post Courier (1978–2000).
- Zakia Zaki, 35, Afghan director of Radio Peace, shot.

=== 7 ===
- Gilbert Gude, 84, United States Representative from Maryland (1967–1977), heart failure.
- Michael Hamburger, 83, German-born British poet, translator, critic.
- Sahar Hussein al-Haideri, 44, Iraqi journalist, shot.

=== 8 ===
- Aden Adde, 98, Somali politician, first President of Somalia (1960–1967).
- Martin Buckmaster, 3rd Viscount Buckmaster, 86, English diplomat.
- Hideo Kanze, 79, Japanese Noh actor and director, intestinal cancer.
- Nellie Lutcher, 94, American jazz singer and pianist, pneumonia.
- Kenny Olsson, 30, Swedish speedway rider, crash.
- Lynne Randell, 57, Australian singer ("Ciao Baby"), apparent suicide.
- Richard Rorty, 75, American philosopher, pancreatic cancer.

=== 9 ===
- Frankie Abernathy, 25, American cast member of The Real World: San Diego, cystic fibrosis.
- Rudolf Arnheim, 102, German-born American author, psychologist, and theorist of film and visual art.
- Lorne Carr, 96, Canadian ice hockey player (New York Rangers, Toronto Maple Leafs).
- Eddie Crush, 90, English cricketer (Kent) (1946–1949).
- Reinhard Dietze, 52, German Olympic gymnast (1976).
- Bill Ellis, 87, English cricketer (Nottinghamshire).
- Harry Ewing, Baron Ewing of Kirkford, 76, British Labour politician, cancer.
- Dušan Furlan, 77, Slovenian Olympic gymnast (1952).
- Rob Goode, 80, American football player (Washington Redskins, Philadelphia Eagles).
- Achieng Oneko, 87, Kenyan freedom fighter and politician, heart attack.
- Ousmane Sembène, 84, Senegalese film director, producer and writer, after long illness.
- Elias Wen, 110, Chinese-born Protopresbyter (senior clergy) of the Russian Orthodox Church.
- Leonard E. H. Williams, 87, British World War II Spitfire pilot and businessman.

=== 10 ===
- Augie Auer, 67, American-born New Zealand atmospheric scientist and meteorologist, heart attack.
- George Rrurrambu Burarrwanga, 50, Australian singer (Warumpi Band).
- Rolf Caroli, 73, German boxer and Olympian (1960).
- Jeff Erlanger, 36, American disability rights activist, asphyxiation.
- Joe Ferreira, 90, American soccer player and Olympian (1948).
- Charley Harper, 84, American wildlife artist, pneumonia.
- Jim Killingsworth, 83, American college basketball coach (Idaho State, Oklahoma State, TCU), complications from stroke.
- Laurence Mancuso, 72, American founding abbot of Monks of New Skete, complications of injuries from a fall.
- John Ostashek, 71, Canadian Yukon Party Leader (1992–1999) and Yukon Government Leader (1992–1996), cancer.
- Parviz Varjavand, 73, Iranian archaeologist, heart failure.

=== 11 ===
- Bobby Beaton, 94, Canadian ice hockey player, professional boxer and boxing referee.
- Eamonn Coleman, 59, Northern Irish Gaelic football coach (Derry GAA), non-Hodgkin lymphoma.
- Gyula Dobay, 69, Hungarian swimmer and Olympian (1956, 1960, 1964).
- Jorge Escalante, 66, Mexican swimmer and Olympian (1960).
- Acie Griggs, 83, American baseball player.
- Jonathan Henry, 36, British police officer.
- Vern Hoscheit, 85, American Major League Baseball bullpen coach.
- Ray Mears, 80, American basketball coach of the University of Tennessee Volunteers (1963–1977).
- Mala Powers, 75, American film actress (Cyrano de Bergerac, Outrage), leukemia.

=== 12 ===
- Adrian Breton, 44, British sports shooter and Olympian (1988, 1992).
- Donald D. Clancy, 85, American Mayor of Cincinnati (1957–1960), US Representative from Ohio (1961–1977), Parkinson's disease.
- Colin Fletcher, 85, American writer on hiking, complications of old age and injuries from a 2001 car accident.
- Tito Gómez, 59, Puerto Rican salsa singer, former member of Ray Barretto and Sonora Ponceña bands, heart attack.
- Don Herbert, 89, American TV host ("Mr. Wizard"), bone cancer.
- Sir Wally Herbert, 72, British polar explorer.
- Jim Norton, 68, American football player (Houston Oilers, 1960–1969).
- Guy de Rothschild, 98, French banker and member of the Rothschild family.
- Frank Scarrabelotti, 109, Australia's oldest living man.
- Samuel Isaac Weissman, 94, American chemist known for his work on the Manhattan Project.

=== 13 ===
- Jessie Davis, 26, American murder victim.
- Walid Eido, 65, Lebanese politician, bomb.
- Sir David Hatch, 68, British managing director of BBC Radio, comic actor (I'm Sorry, I'll Read That Again).
- Oskar Morawetz, 90, Canadian classical composer.
- Claude Netter, 82, French Olympic fencer.
- Néstor Rossi, 82, Argentine footballer, played in 1958 FIFA World Cup.
- John Stanton Ward, 89, British artist.

=== 14 ===
- Wim Gerlach, 71, Dutch Olympic boxer (1960, 1964).
- Ruth Graham, 87, American author.
- Jørgen Hare, 83, Danish Olympic shooter (1952).
- Jack Hasen, 65, Canadian Olympic sailor (1968).
- Margaret Hunt Hill, 91, American heiress and philanthropist.
- William LeMessurier, 81, American structural engineer, complications from surgery following a fall.
- Martin McKay, 70, Irish Olympic cyclist.
- Robin Olds, 84, American fighter pilot, heart failure.
- Jacques Simonet, 43, Belgian politician and mayor of Anderlecht, heart attack.
- Alex Thomson, 78, British cinematographer (Excalibur, Alien 3, Labyrinth).
- Peter Ucko, 68, British archaeologist, complications of diabetes.
- Kurt Waldheim, 88, Austrian President (1986–1992), UN Secretary-General (1972–1981), World War II Wehrmacht officer, heart failure.
- Larry Whiteside, 69, American baseball journalist.

=== 15 ===
- Richard Bell, 61, Canadian keyboardist (Janis Joplin, The Band), cancer.
- Bertin Borna, 76, Beninese politician, former finance minister.
- Claudia Cohen, 56, American socialite and journalist, ovarian cancer.
- Hugo Corro, 53, Argentine World Boxing Association and World Boxing Council middleweight boxing champion (1978–1979).
- Kees Krijgh Sr., 85, Dutch footballer and Olympian (1948).
- Sherri Martel, 49, American professional wrestler and valet (WWF, WCW, AWA), accidental overdose.

=== 16 ===
- Robin Beard, 67, American Representative from Tennessee (1973–1983), brain tumor.
- Jack Doohan, 87, Australian politician, Member of the New South Wales Legislative Council (1978–1991).
- Norman Hackerman, 95, American former president of the University of Texas at Austin and Rice University, heart disease.
- Grand Ayatollah Fazel Lankarani, 76, Iranian religious leader.
- Thommie Walsh, 57, American dancer (A Chorus Line) and Tony Award-winning choreographer, lymphoma.

=== 17 ===
- Jamal Abdul Karim al-Dabban, 68, Iraqi Sunni religious leader, heart attack.
- Ben Brocklehurst, 85, British cricketer and publisher.
- Cheng Shifa, 86, Chinese painter, cartoonist and calligrapher.
- Angelo Felici, 87, Italian Catholic Cardinal, President Emeritus of the Pontifical Commission Ecclesia Dei.
- Gianfranco Ferré, 62, Italian fashion designer, brain haemorrhage.
- Ed Friendly, 85, American television producer (Little House on the Prairie, Rowan & Martin's Laugh-In), cancer.
- Jill Hood-Linzee, 78, British figure skater and Olympian (1948).
- Velimir Ilić, 81, Yugoslav Olympic long-distance runner (1952).
- Jay Newman, 59, Canadian philosopher, cancer.
- José Abílio Osório Soares, 60, Indonesian last governor of East Timor.
- Fred C. Stinson, 84, Canadian politician.

=== 18 ===
- Bill Barber, 87, American jazz tuba player, played with Miles Davis and John Coltrane, heart failure.
- Vilma Espín, 77, Cuban wife of acting President Raúl Castro, president of Cuban Women's Federation.
- Kenneth Franklin, 84, American astronomer at the Hayden Planetarium.
- Remond Larsen, 93, Danish Olympic rower (1936).
- Tung Hua Lin, 96, Chinese engineer, designed China's first twin-engine aircraft, heart failure.
- Bernard Manning, 76, British comedian, kidney failure.
- Hank Medress, 68, American singer (The Tokens), producer of The Chiffons and Tony Orlando and Dawn, lung cancer.
- Georges Thurston, 55, Canadian author and composer known as "Boule Noire" (Afro), colorectal cancer.
- Cheves Walling, 91, American organic chemist.

=== 19 ===
- Antonio Aguilar, 88, Mexican actor, pneumonia.
- Roy Botham, 84, British Olympic swimmer (1948, 1952).
- Victorio Cieslinskas, 84, Uruguayan Olympic basketball player (1948, 1952).
- Tommy Eytle, 80, Guyanese-born British actor (EastEnders) and jazz musician.
- El Fary, 69, Spanish singer, lung cancer.
- Terry Hoeppner, 59, American football coach for Indiana University, brain tumor.
- Antanas Karoblis, 67, Lithuanian politician.
- Piara Khabra, 82, British Labour MP for Ealing, Southall (1992–2007).
- József Komatits, 56, Hungarian Olympic fencer (1976).
- Alberto Mijangos, 81, Mexican-American painter, lymphoma.
- Ze'ev Schiff, 74, Israeli military journalist, heart disease.
- Klausjürgen Wussow, 78, German actor, after long illness.

=== 20 ===
- Nazik Al-Malaika, 84, Iraqi poet, old age.
- Rudy Autio, 80, American sculptor, leukemia.
- Jerry Fleishman, 85, American basketball player (Philadelphia Warriors).
- Anita Guha, Indian actress, heart failure.
- J. B. Handelsman, 85, American cartoonist for The New Yorker, lung cancer.
- Sonnhilde Hausschild-Kallus, 71, German cross-country skier and Olympian (1956, 1960).
- Margaret Helfand, 59, American architect and urban planner, colon cancer.
- Trevor Henry, 105, New Zealand Supreme Court justice.
- Reginald Johansson, 81, New Zealand field hockey player and Olympian (1956).
- Mamadou Konte, 65, Senegalese music producer, founder of the Africa Fete music festival and record label.
- Jim Shoulders, 79, American Pro Rodeo Hall of Famer, heart ailment.

=== 21 ===
- Georg Danzer, 60, Austrian singer, lung cancer.
- Bob Evans, 89, American founder of Bob Evans Restaurants, pneumonia.
- Fred Evans, 86, American football player.
- Georges Floquet, 86, French Olympic gymnast (1952).
- Douglas Hill, 72, Canadian author.
- Peter Liba, 67, Canadian Lieutenant-Governor of Manitoba (1999–2004).
- Carlos Romero, 80, American actor (Falcon Crest, Soylent Green, The Professionals).
- Marshall D. Shulman, 91, American Sovietologist who founded the Averell Harriman Institute at Columbia University.
- Mary Ellen Solt, 86, American poet and critic, stroke.

=== 22 ===
- Bernd Becher, 75, German photographer, complications of heart surgery.
- Nancy Benoit, 43, American professional wrestler and manager (WCW, ECW), strangulation.
- Eleanor Emery, 88, British diplomat, High Commissioner to Botswana.
- Luciano Fabro, 70, Italian artist and theorist in Arte Povera movement, heart attack.
- Alfonso Fiorentino, 82-83, Argentine Olympic weightlifter (1948).
- Lenar Gilmullin, 22, Russian footballer (FC Rubin Kazan), motorcycle accident.
- William L. Hungate, 84, American judge, U.S. Representative (1964–1977), complications of surgery.
- Hans Krause-Wichmann, 81, German Olympic rower (1952).
- Jack Ormston, 97, British speedway rider.
- Erik Parlevliet, 43, Dutch field hockey player, after long illness.
- Guy Vander Jagt, 75, United States Representative from Michigan (1966–1993), pancreatic cancer.

=== 23 ===
- Rod Beck, 38, American baseball player (San Francisco Giants, Boston Red Sox, Chicago Cubs).
- Hou Yaowen, 59, Chinese xiangsheng (cross-talk) actor, heart attack.
- Hans Sennholz, 85, German-born economist.
- Nguyễn Chánh Thi, 84, Vietnamese general for South Vietnam during the Vietnam War.

=== 24 ===
- Byron Baer, 77, American legislator for New Jersey (1971–2005), heart failure.
- István Baranya, 76, Hungarian Olympic wrestler (1956).
- Gillian Baverstock, 75, British novelist, daughter of Enid Blyton.
- Chris Benoit, 40, Canadian professional wrestler (WWE, WCW, NJPW), suicide by hanging.
- Edouard Brunner, 75, Swiss diplomat and United Nations mediator.
- Derek Dougan, 69, Northern Irish footballer (Wolves, Northern Ireland).
- Pete Eberling, 55, American Olympic speed skater (1972).
- John Flynt, 92, United States Representative from Georgia (1954–1979).
- Carl-Jan Hamilton, 90, Swedish Olympic equestrian (1952).
- Léon Jeck, 60, Belgian footballer (Standard Liège, national team).
- Robert Kroon, 82, Dutch journalist, pancreatic cancer.
- Charles W. Lindberg, 86, American last surviving marine who raised the first flag on Mount Suribachi during the Battle of Iwo Jima.
- Natasja Saad, 32, Danish rapper, car accident.
- Joey Sadler, 92, New Zealand All Blacks rugby union player.
- Joy Simonson, 88, American feminist, complications of pneumonia.
- Biff Wellington, 44, Canadian professional wrestler, heart attack.
- Maurice Wood, 90, British Anglican Bishop of Norwich (1971–1985).

=== 25 ===
- Jurgis Blekaitis, 89, Lithuanian-American poet and theatre producer, Alzheimer's disease.
- Alida Bosshardt, 94, Dutch "public face" of the Salvation Army.
- Dana Bullen, 75, American journalist and advocate for freedom of the press, cancer.
- Liliane Chappuis, 51, Swiss member of the National Council, heart attack.
- J. Fred Duckett, 74, American sports announcer and teacher, leukemia.
- Fasal al Gaood, Iraqi former governor of Al Anbar, Sunni tribal sheikh prominent in alliance against Al Qaeda, suicide bomb victim.
- Bob Grant, 73, Australian Olympic javelin thrower (1956).
- Jeeva, 43, Indian director and cinematographer.
- Mahasti, 60, Iranian singer, colon cancer.
- Jan Herman Linge, 85, Norwegian boat designer, Soling and Yngling class.
- Bill Moss, 76, American gospel musician (The Celestials), emphysema.
- Adrian Mung'andu, 84, Zambian Catholic archbishop of Lusaka (1984–1996).
- William O'Brien, 77, American politician, Minnesota State Auditor (1969–1971).
- Brenda Rawnsley, 90, British arts campaigner.
- Paul Smith, 85, American typewriter artist.

=== 26 ===
- Tina Brozman, 54, American Bankruptcy Court judge, complications of ovarian cancer.
- Liz Claiborne, 78, Belgian-born American fashion designer, cancer.
- Jupp Derwall, 80, German football coach of West Germany (1978–1984), heart attack.
- Lucien Hervé, 96, Hungarian-born French photographer, after long illness.
- Bobby Hussey, 67, American basketball coach at Virginia Tech and Davidson College.
- Dame Thea King, 81, British clarinetist.
- Luigi Meneghello, 85, Italian writer and essayist.
- Malcolm Slesser, 80, British scientist and mountaineer, suspected heart attack while hillwalking.
- Tamaiti Willie Star, 80, Nauruan diplomat and politician.

=== 27 ===
- Patrick Allotey, 28, Ghanaian footballer for Feyenoord and Ghana.
- Milan Antolković, 91, Croatian footballer and manager.
- Kari Blackburn, 53, British broadcaster, suicide by drowning.
- William Hutt, 87, Canadian actor, leukemia.
- Hugh Johns, 83, British football commentator with ITV.
- Jimmy Marks, 62, American Romani civil rights leader, heart attack.
- Ashraf Marwan, 63, Egyptian son-in-law of former President Nasser, alleged double agent.
- Emilio Ochoa, 99, Cuban who was last living signatory of the 1940 Constitution, cardiac arrest.
- Ruslan Odizhev, 33, Russian former Guantanamo Bay detainee, shot by police.
- Silas Rhodes, 91, American educator, founder of the School of Visual Arts.
- Dragutin Tadijanović, 101, Croatian author.
- Bruno Tolentino, 66, Brazilian poet, three-time Prêmio Jabuti laureate (1994, 2000, 2007), multiple organ failure.

=== 28 ===
- Inez Baskin, 91, American journalist, covered the Montgomery bus boycott.
- Leo Burmester, 63, American actor (The Abyss, The Last Temptation of Christ, A Perfect World), leukemia.
- Moshe Decter, 85, American activist for Israel and Jewish causes.
- Eugene B. Fluckey, 93, American submarine commander awarded the Medal of Honor during World War II.
- Bruce R. Kennedy, 68, American businessman, former chairman and CEO of Alaska Airlines, plane crash.
- Abraham Klausner, 92, American rabbi, supporter of Holocaust survivors, complications of Parkinson's disease.
- Kiichi Miyazawa, 87, Japanese Prime Minister (1991–1993), natural causes.
- Thomas K. Mooney, 45, American diplomat and soldier.
- Shinji Nakae, 72, Japanese voice actor and narrator.
- Howie Schneider, 77, American cartoonist (Eek and Meek), complications of heart surgery.
- Catherine Troeh, 96, American native people activist and historian.
- Jess Weiss, 90, American anesthesiologist.
- Maurice Wohl, 90, British property developer and philanthropist.

=== 29 ===
- Frank W. Burke, 87, American politician, US Representative (1959–1963), Mayor of Louisville (1969–1973).
- Raymond E. Douglas, 58, American executive with The New York Times, who helped add color to its pages, pulmonary embolism.
- John Hansl, 82, Croatian ex-concentration camp guard whose United States citizenship was revoked in 2005, congestive heart failure.
- Harry Henshel, 88, American watchmaker, last member of the Bulova family to head that company.
- George McCorkle, 60, American guitarist with The Marshall Tucker Band, cancer.
- Fred Saberhagen, 77, American writer of Berserker series, cancer.
- Joel Siegel, 63, American film critic for Good Morning America on ABC, colon cancer.
- Alojzij Šuštar, 86, Slovenian former Archbishop of Ljubljana.
- Edward Yang, 59, Taiwanese film director (Yi Yi), colon cancer.
- Cai Yanxiong, 91, Chinese Olympic basketball player (1936).

=== 30 ===
- Gottfried von Bismarck, 44, German aristocrat, businessman and socialite, suspected heroin overdose.
- Heinrich Boller, 85, Swiss Olympic ice hockey player (1948).
- Jim Corbett, 82, American politician, Mayor of Tucson, Arizona (1967–1971), Arizona legislator (1956–1958), heart problems.
- Bruce Greensill, 65, Australian rugby union player and administrator, represented Auckland and Sydney.
- Will Schaefer, 78, American composer of background music for I Dream of Jeannie and The Flintstones, cancer.
- Robert E. Sweeney, 82, American politician, US Representative from Ohio (1965–1967), heart problems.
- Sahib Singh Verma, 64, Indian Chief Minister of Delhi (1996–1998), Bharatiya Janata Party leader, car accident.
- Norman Williams, 92, Australian World War II air gunner.
