= June 19 =

June 19 this year in various calendars
- Friday, 19 June 2026
Akan	Kurufie
Armenian	4 Hrotich 1475
Aztec	Teotleco 20, 5 Tōchtli
Babylonian	3 Simanu, 2337 SE
Balinese pawukon	Luang, Pepet, Pasah, Laba, Paing, Paniron, Sukra of Dunggulan, Indra, Dangu, Manuh
Bengali	5 Asharh, BS 1433
Chinese	Yang Wood Rat・Ghost Mansion; Fire Horse Year, Month 5, Day 5 (Mangzhong, 2 days until Xiazhi)
Common Era	19 June 2026 CE
Coptic	12 Paoni, AM 1742
Egyptian	4 Athyr, 2775 NE
Ethiopian	12 Sanē, 2018 Amätä Məhrät
French Republican	Décade I, Primidi de Messidor de l'Année 234 de la République
Gregorian	19 June, AD 2026
Hebrew	4 Tamuz, AM 5786
Hindu	Āśleṣā・Harṣaṇa; Solar: 5 Āṣāḍha, 1948 SE; Lunisolar: Pañcamī, Śukla pakṣa of Jyeṣṭha, 2083 VE; Rāudra・5127 KY・1,872,745
Icelandic	Föstudagur, 28 Skerpla 2026
Islamic	3 Muharram, AH 1448 (using tabular method)
ISO week date	2026-W25-5
Japanese	5 Satsuki, Reiwa 8 (Bōshu, 2 days until Geshi)
Julian	6 June, AD 2026 (AM 7534)
Julian day	2461211
Korean	5 Maldal, 4359 DE
Maya	13.0.13.12.8; 1 Tzec, 5 Lamat
Roman	ante diem VIII Idus Iunias, MMDCCLXXIX AUC
Solar Hijri	29 Khordad, SH 1405
Tibetan	5 snron, me pho rta 2153 or 1772 or 1000

<<	June					>>
Su	Mo	Tu	We	Th	Fr	Sa
	1	2	3	4	5	6
7	8	9	10	11	12	13
14	15	16	17	18	19	20
21	22	23	24	25	26	27
28	29	30
2026

June 19 in recent years
2026 (Friday)
2025 (Thursday)
2024 (Wednesday)
2023 (Monday)
2022 (Sunday)
2021 (Saturday)
2020 (Friday)
2019 (Wednesday)
2018 (Tuesday)
2017 (Monday)

June 19 is the 170th day of the year (171st in leap years) in the Gregorian calendar; 195 days remain until the end of the year.

== Events ==
=== Pre-1600 ===
- 325 – The original Nicene Creed is adopted at the First Council of Nicaea.
- 978 – Byzantine forces loyal to emperor Basil II under Bardas Phokas the Younger defeat rebel forces under Bardas Skleros in the battle of Pankaleia (approximate date).
- 1306 – The Earl of Pembroke's army defeats Bruce's Scottish army at the Battle of Methven.
- 1586 – English colonists leave Roanoke Island, after failing to establish England's first permanent settlement in North America.

=== 1601–1900 ===
- 1718 – At least 73,000 people die in the 1718 Tongwei–Gansu earthquake due to landslides in the Qing dynasty.
- 1785 – The Boston King's Chapel adopts James Freeman's revised prayer book, without the Nicene Creed, establishing it as the first Unitarian congregation in the United States.
- 1791 – The first New Church place of worship the Birmingham New Jerusalem Temple was dedicated on the 19th day of June, 1791, in Birmingham, England. The auspiciousness of this date was noted at the time.
- 1800 – War of the Second Coalition: Battle of Höchstädt results in a French victory over Austria.
- 1811 – The Carlton House Fête is held in London to celebrate the establishment of the Regency era.
- 1816 – Battle of Seven Oaks between North West Company and Hudson's Bay Company, near Winnipeg, Manitoba, Canada.
- 1821 – Decisive defeat of the Filiki Eteria by the Ottomans at Drăgășani (in Wallachia).
- 1846 – The first officially recorded, organized baseball game is played under Alexander Cartwright's rules on Hoboken, New Jersey's Elysian Fields with the New York Base Ball Club defeating the Knickerbockers 23–1. Cartwright umpired.
- 1850 – Princess Louise of the Netherlands marries Crown Prince Karl of Sweden–Norway.
- 1862 – President Abraham Lincoln signs the Territorial Slavery Act of 1862, which prohibits slavery in all current and future United States territories.
- 1865 – Over two years after the Emancipation Proclamation, slaves in Galveston, Texas, United States, are officially informed of their freedom. The anniversary was officially celebrated in Texas and other states as Juneteenth. On June 17, 2021, Juneteenth officially became a federal holiday in the United States.
- 1867 – Maximilian I of the Second Mexican Empire is executed by a firing squad in Querétaro, Querétaro.
- 1875 – The Herzegovinian rebellion against the Ottoman Empire begins.

=== 1901–present ===
- 1903 – Benito Mussolini, at the time a radical Socialist, is arrested by Bern police for advocating a violent general strike.
- 1910 – The first Father's Day is celebrated in Spokane, Washington.
- 1913 – Natives Land Act, 1913 in South Africa implemented.
- 1921 – The village of Knockcroghery, Ireland, is burned by British forces.
- 1926 – King Roger, an opera about Roger II of Sicily by Karol Szymanowski, is premiered at the Grand Theatre in Warsaw.
- 1934 – The Communications Act of 1934 establishes the United States' Federal Communications Commission (FCC).
- 1943 – The Philadelphia Eagles and Pittsburgh Steelers of the NFL merge for one season due to player shortages caused by World War II.
- 1945 – The Smoke Tragedy leaves 355 workers dead in the underground copper mine of El Teniente, Chile.
- 1947 – Pan Am Flight 121 crashes in the Syrian Desert near Mayadin, Syria, killing 15 and injuring 21.
- 1953 – Cold War: Julius and Ethel Rosenberg are executed at Sing Sing, in New York.
- 1960 – Charlotte Motor Speedway holds its first NASCAR race, the inaugural World 600.
- 1961 – Kuwait declares independence from the United Kingdom.
- 1964 – The Civil Rights Act of 1964 is approved after surviving an 83-day filibuster in the United States Senate.
- 1965 – Nguyễn Cao Kỳ becomes Prime Minister of South Vietnam at the head of a military junta; General Nguyễn Văn Thiệu becomes the figurehead chief of state.
- 1978 – Garfield's first comic strip, originally published locally as Jon in 1976, goes into nationwide syndication.
- 1982 – The People's Armed Police is de facto founded; it is officially established 10 months later on April 5, 1983.
- 1985 – Members of the Revolutionary Party of Central American Workers, dressed as Salvadoran soldiers, attack the Zona Rosa area of San Salvador.
- 1987 – Basque separatist group ETA commits one of its most violent attacks, in which a bomb is set off in a supermarket, Hipercor, killing 21 and injuring 45.
- 1987 – Aeroflot Flight N-528 crashes at Berdiansk Airport in present-day Ukraine, killing eight people.
- 1988 – Pope John Paul II canonizes 117 Vietnamese Martyrs.
- 1990 – The current international law defending indigenous peoples, Indigenous and Tribal Peoples Convention, 1989, is ratified for the first time by Norway.
- 1990 – The Communist Party of the Russian Soviet Federative Socialist Republic is founded in Moscow.
- 1991 – The last Soviet army units in Hungary are withdrawn.
- 2005 – Following a series of Michelin tire failures during the United States Grand Prix weekend at Indianapolis, and without an agreement being reached, 14 cars from seven teams in Michelin tires withdraw after completing the formation lap, leaving only six cars from three teams on Bridgestone tires to race.
- 2007 – The al-Khilani Mosque bombing in Baghdad leaves 78 people dead and another 218 injured.
- 2009 – Mass riots involving over 10,000 people and 10,000 police officers break out in Shishou, China, over the dubious circumstances surrounding the death of a local chef.
- 2009 – War in North-West Pakistan: The Pakistani Armed Forces open Operation Rah-e-Nijat against the Taliban and other Islamist rebels in the South Waziristan area of the Federally Administered Tribal Areas.
- 2012 – WikiLeaks founder Julian Assange requests asylum in London's Ecuadorian Embassy for fear of extradition to the US after publication of previously classified documents including footage of civilian killings by the US army; he will remain there until 2019.
- 2018 – The 10,000,000th United States Patent is issued.
- 2018 – Antwon Rose II is fatally shot in East Pittsburgh by East Pittsburgh Police Officer Michael Rosfeld after being involved in a near-fatal drive-by shooting.
- 2020 – Animal rights advocate Regan Russell is run over and killed by a transport truck outside of a pig slaughterhouse in Burlington, Ontario.

== Births ==
=== Pre-1600 ===
- 1301 – Prince Morikuni, shōgun of Japan (died 1333)
- 1417 – Sigismondo Pandolfo Malatesta, lord of Rimini (died 1468)
- 1566 – James VI and I of the United Kingdom (died 1625)
- 1590 – Philip Bell, British colonial governor (died 1678)
- 1595 – Hargobind, sixth Sikh guru (died 1644)
- 1598 – Gilbert Sheldon, Archbishop of Canterbury (died 1677)

=== 1601–1900 ===
- 1606 – James Hamilton, 1st Duke of Hamilton, Scottish soldier and politician, Lord Chancellor of Scotland (died 1649)
- 1623 – Blaise Pascal, French mathematician and physicist (died 1662)
- 1633 – Philipp van Limborch, Dutch author and theologian (died 1712)
- 1701 – François Rebel, French violinist and composer (died 1775)
- 1731 – Joaquim Machado de Castro, Portuguese sculptor (died 1822)
- 1764 – José Gervasio Artigas, Uruguayan general and politician (died 1850)
- 1771 – Joseph Diaz Gergonne, French mathematician and philosopher (died 1859)
- 1776 – Francis Johnson, American lawyer and politician (died 1842)
- 1783 – Friedrich Sertürner, German chemist and pharmacist (died 1841)
- 1793 – Joseph Earl Sheffield, American businessman and philanthropist (died 1882)
- 1795 – James Braid, Scottish-English surgeon (died 1860)
- 1797 – Hamilton Hume, Australian explorer (died 1873)
- 1815 – Cornelius Krieghoff, Dutch-Canadian painter (died 1872)
- 1816 – William H. Webb, American shipbuilder and philanthropist, founded the Webb Institute (died 1899)
- 1833 – Mary Tenney Gray, American editorial writer, club-woman, philanthropist, and suffragette (died 1904)
- 1834 – Charles Spurgeon, English pastor and author (died 1892)
- 1840 – Georg Karl Maria Seidlitz, German entomologist and academic (died 1917)
- 1843 – Mary Sibbet Copley, American philanthropist (died 1929)
- 1845 – Cléophas Beausoleil, Canadian journalist and politician (died 1904)
- 1846 – Antonio Abetti, Italian astronomer and academic (died 1928)
- 1850 – David Jayne Hill, American historian and politician, 24th United States Assistant Secretary of State (died 1932)
- 1851 – Billy Midwinter, English-Australian cricketer (died 1890)
- 1851 – Silvanus P. Thompson, English physicist, engineer, and academic (died 1916)
- 1854 – Alfredo Catalani, Italian composer and academic (died 1893)
- 1854 – Hjalmar Mellin, Finnish mathematician and theorist (died 1933)
- 1855 – George F. Roesch, American lawyer and politician (died 1917)
- 1858 – Sam Walter Foss, American poet and librarian (died 1911)
- 1861 – Douglas Haig, 1st Earl Haig, Scottish-English field marshal (died 1928)
- 1861 – Émile Haug, French geologist and paleontologist (died 1927)
- 1861 – José Rizal, Filipino journalist, author, and poet (died 1896)
- 1865 – May Whitty, English actress (died 1948)
- 1871 – Alajos Szokolyi, Hungarian hurdler, jumper, and physician (died 1932)
- 1872 – Theodore Payne, English-American gardener and botanist (died 1963)
- 1874 – Peder Oluf Pedersen, Danish physicist and engineer (died 1941)
- 1876 – Nigel Gresley, Scottish-English engineer (died 1941)
- 1877 – Charles Coburn, American actor (died 1961)
- 1881 – Maginel Wright Enright, American illustrator (died 1966)
- 1883 – Gladys Mills Phipps, American horse breeder (died 1970)
- 1884 – Georges Ribemont-Dessaignes, French painter and historian (died 1974)
- 1886 – Finley Hamilton, American lawyer and politician (died 1940)
- 1888 – Arthur Massey Berry, Canadian soldier and pilot (died 1970)
- 1888 – Frank Johnston, Canadian artist, member of The Group of Seven (died 1949)
- 1891 – John Heartfield, German photographer and activist (died 1968)
- 1896 – Rajani Palme Dutt, English journalist and politician (died 1974)
- 1896 – Wallis Simpson, Duchess of Windsor, American wife of the former King Edward VIII of the United Kingdom, Duke of Windsor (died 1986)
- 1897 – Cyril Norman Hinshelwood, English chemist and academic, Nobel Prize laureate (died 1967)
- 1897 – Moe Howard, American comedian (died 1975)

=== 1901–present ===
- 1902 – Guy Lombardo, Canadian-American violinist and bandleader (died 1977)
- 1903 – Mary Callery, American-French sculptor and academic (died 1977)
- 1903 – Lou Gehrig, American baseball player (died 1941)
- 1903 – Wally Hammond, English cricketer and coach (died 1965)
- 1903 – Hans Litten, German lawyer (died 1938)
- 1905 – Mildred Natwick, American actress (died 1994)
- 1906 – Ernst Boris Chain, German-Irish biochemist and academic, Nobel Prize laureate (died 1979)
- 1906 – Knut Kroon, Swedish footballer (died 1975)
- 1906 – Walter Rauff, German SS officer (died 1984)
- 1907 – Clarence Wiseman, Canadian 10th General of the Salvation Army (died 1985)
- 1909 – Osamu Dazai, Japanese author (died 1948)
- 1909 – Rūdolfs Jurciņš, Latvian basketball player (died 1948)
- 1910 – Sydney Allard, English race car driver, founded the Allard Company (died 1966)
- 1910 – Paul Flory, American chemist and engineer, Nobel Prize laureate (died 1985)
- 1910 – Abe Fortas, American lawyer and jurist, associate member of the US Supreme Court (died 1982)
- 1912 – Don Gutteridge, American baseball player and manager (died 2008)
- 1912 – Virginia MacWatters, American soprano and actress (died 2005)
- 1913 – Helene Madison, American swimmer (died 1970)
- 1914 – Alan Cranston, American journalist and politician (died 2000)
- 1914 – Lester Flatt, American bluegrass singer-songwriter, guitarist, and mandolin player (died 1979)
- 1915 – Pat Buttram, American actor (died 1994)
- 1915 – Julius Schwartz, American publisher and agent (died 2004)
- 1917 – Joshua Nkomo, Zimbabwean guerrilla leader and politician, Vice President of Zimbabwe (died 1999)
- 1919 – Pauline Kael, American film critic (died 2001)
- 1920 – Yves Robert, French actor, director, and screenwriter (died 2002)
- 1921 – Louis Jourdan, French-American actor and singer (died 2015)
- 1922 – Aage Bohr, Danish physicist and academic, Nobel Prize laureate (died 2009)
- 1922 – Marilyn P. Johnson, American educator and diplomat, 8th United States Ambassador to Togo (died 2022)
- 1923 – Bob Hank, Australian footballer and coach (died 2012)
- 1926 – Erna Schneider Hoover, American mathematician and inventor
- 1927 – Luciano Benjamín Menéndez, Argentine general and human rights violator (died 2018)
- 1928 – Tommy DeVito, American singer and guitarist (died 2020)
- 1928 – Nancy Marchand, American actress (died 2000)
- 1930 – Gena Rowlands, American actress (died 2024)
- 1930 – Boris Parygin, Soviet philosopher, psychologist, and author (died 2012)
- 1932 – Pier Angeli, Italian actress, twin sister to Marisa Pavan (died 1971)
- 1932 – José Sanchis Grau, Spanish author and illustrator (died 2011)
- 1932 – Marisa Pavan, Italian actress, twin sister to Pier Angeli (died 2023)
- 1933 – Viktor Patsayev, Kazakh engineer and astronaut (died 1971)
- 1934 – Gérard Latortue, Haitian politician, 12th Prime Minister of Haiti (died 2023)
- 1936 – Marisa Galvany, American soprano and actress
- 1937 – André Glucksmann, French philosopher and author (died 2015)
- 1938 – Wahoo McDaniel, American football player and wrestler (died 2002)
- 1939 – Bernd Hoss, German footballer and manager (died 2016)
- 1939 – John MacArthur, American minister and theologian (died 2025)
- 1941 – Václav Klaus, Czech economist and politician, 2nd President of the Czech Republic
- 1942 – Merata Mita, New Zealand director and producer (died 2010)
- 1944 – Chico Buarque, Brazilian singer, composer, writer and poet
- 1945 – Radovan Karadžić, Serbian-Bosnian politician and convicted war criminal, 1st President of Republika Srpska
- 1945 – Aung San Suu Kyi, Burmese politician, Nobel Prize laureate
- 1945 – Tobias Wolff, American short story writer, memoirist, and novelist
- 1945 – Peter Bardens, British keyboardist (died 2002)
- 1946 – Jimmy Greenhoff, English footballer and manager
- 1947 – Salman Rushdie, Indian-English novelist and essayist
- 1947 – John Ralston Saul, Canadian philosopher and author
- 1948 – Nick Drake, English singer-songwriter (died 1974)
- 1948 – Phylicia Rashad, American actress
- 1950 – Neil Asher Silberman, American archaeologist and historian
- 1950 – Ann Wilson, American singer-songwriter and musician
- 1951 – Ayman al-Zawahiri, Egyptian terrorist (died 2022)
- 1951 – Francesco Moser, Italian cyclist
- 1952 – Bob Ainsworth, English politician, Secretary of State for Defence
- 1954 – Mike O'Brien, English lawyer and politician, Solicitor General for England and Wales
- 1954 – Lou Pearlman, American music producer and fraudster (died 2016)
- 1954 – Kathleen Turner, American actress
- 1954 – Richard Wilkins, New Zealand-Australian journalist and television presenter
- 1955 – Mary O'Connor, New Zealand runner
- 1955 – Mary Schapiro, American lawyer and politician
- 1957 – Anna Lindh, Swedish politician, 39th Swedish Minister of Foreign Affairs (died 2003)
- 1957 – Jean Rabe, American journalist and author
- 1957 – Subcomandante Marcos, Mexican insurgent and EZLN leader
- 1958 – Sergei Makarov, Russian-American ice hockey player and coach
- 1959 – Mark DeBarge, American singer-songwriter and trumpet player
- 1959 – Christian Wulff, German lawyer and politician, 10th President of Germany
- 1960 – Andrew Dilnot, English economist and academic
- 1960 – Johnny Gray, American runner and coach
- 1960 – Luke Morley, English guitarist, songwriter, and producer
- 1960 – Patti Rizzo, American golfer
- 1962 – Paula Abdul, American singer-songwriter, dancer, actress, and presenter
- 1962 – Jeremy Bates, English tennis player
- 1962 – Ashish Vidyarthi, Indian actor
- 1963 – Laura Ingraham, American radio host and author
- 1963 – Margarita Ponomaryova, Russian hurdler
- 1963 – Rory Underwood, English rugby player, lieutenant, and pilot
- 1964 – Brent Goulet, American soccer player and manager
- 1964 – Boris Johnson, former Prime Minister of the United Kingdom and former Mayor of London
- 1964 – Brian Vander Ark, American singer-songwriter and guitarist
- 1965 – Sabine Braun, German heptathlete
- 1965 – Sadie Frost, English actress and producer
- 1966 – Mike Hasenfratz, Canadian ice hockey referee (died 2024)
- 1966 – Michalis Romanidis, Greek basketball player
- 1967 – Bjørn Dæhlie, Norwegian skier and businessman
- 1968 – Alastair Lynch, Australian footballer and sportscaster
- 1968 – Timothy Morton, American philosopher and academic
- 1968 – Kimberly Anne "Kim" Walker, American film and television actress (died 2001)
- 1970 – Rahul Gandhi, Indian politician
- 1970 – Quincy Watts, American sprinter and football player
- 1970 – Brian Welch, American singer-songwriter and guitarist
- 1971 – José Emilio Amavisca, Spanish footballer
- 1971 – Chris Armstrong, English footballer
- 1972 – Jean Dujardin, French actor
- 1972 – Dennis Lyxzén, Swedish singer
- 1972 – Ilya Markov, Russian race walker
- 1972 – Brian McBride, American soccer player and coach
- 1972 – Poppy Montgomery, Australian actress
- 1972 – Robin Tunney, American actress
- 1973 – Jahine Arnold, American football player
- 1973 – Yuko Nakazawa, Japanese singer
- 1973 – Yasuhiko Yabuta, Japanese baseball player
- 1974 – Doug Mientkiewicz, American baseball player, coach, and manager
- 1974 – Mustaque Ahmed Ruhi, Bangladeshi member of parliament
- 1975 – Hugh Dancy, English actor and model
- 1975 – Anthony Parker, American basketball player
- 1976 – Dennis Crowley, American businessman, co-founded Foursquare
- 1976 – Bryan Hughes, English footballer and manager
- 1976 – Anita Wilson, American singer-songwriter and producer
- 1978 – Dirk Nowitzki, German basketball player
- 1978 – Zoe Saldaña, American actress
- 1978 – Claudio Vargas, Dominican baseball player
- 1979 – José Kléberson, Brazilian footballer
- 1980 – Jean Carroll, Irish cricketer
- 1980 – Dan Ellis, Canadian ice hockey player
- 1980 – Robbie Neilson, Scottish footballer and manager
- 1980 – Nuno Santos, Portuguese footballer
- 1981 – Mohammed Al-Khuwalidi, Saudi Arabian long jumper
- 1981 – Moss Burmester, New Zealand swimmer
- 1982 – Alexander Frolov, Russian ice hockey player
- 1982 – Chris Vermeulen, Australian motorcycle racer
- 1982 – Michael Yarmush, American actor
- 1983 – Macklemore, American rapper
- 1983 – Aidan Turner, Irish actor
- 1984 – Paul Dano, American actor
- 1984 – Wieke Dijkstra, Dutch field hockey player
- 1984 – Andri Eleftheriou, Cypriot sport shooter
- 1985 – Ai Miyazato, Japanese golfer
- 1985 – José Ernesto Sosa, Argentinian footballer
- 1985 – Dire Tune, Ethiopian runner
- 1986 – Aoiyama Kōsuke, Bulgarian sumo wrestler
- 1986 – Lázaro Borges, Cuban pole vaulter
- 1986 – Marvin Williams, American basketball player
- 1987 – Rashard Mendenhall, American football player
- 1988 – Jacob deGrom, American baseball player
- 1990 – Ashly Burch, American actress, writer, and director
- 1990 – Moa Hjelmer, Swedish sprinter
- 1990 – Xavier Rhodes, American football player
- 1992 – Keaton Jennings, South African-English cricketer
- 1992 – C. J. Mosley, American football player
- 1993 – KSI, English YouTuber
- 1994 – Lejla Njemčević, Bosnian cross-country and mountain bike cyclist
- 1998 – Atticus Shaffer, American actor and YouTuber
- 1998 – Joshua Da Silva, Trinidadian cricketer
- 1999 – Jordan Poole, American basketball player
- 2002 – Bennedict Mathurin, Canadian basketball player
- 2002 – Nuno Mendes, Portuguese footballer
- 2004 – Millie Gibson, English actress

== Deaths ==
=== Pre-1600 ===
- 404 – Huan Xuan, Jin-dynasty warlord and emperor of Huan Chu (born 369)
- 626 – Soga no Umako, Japanese son of Soga no Iname (born 551)
- 930 – Xiao Qing, chancellor of Later Liang (born 862)
- 1027 – Romuald, Italian mystic and saint (born 951)
- 1185 – Taira no Munemori, Japanese soldier (born 1147)
- 1282 – Eleanor de Montfort, Welsh princess (born 1252)
- 1312 – Piers Gaveston, 1st Earl of Cornwall, English politician (born 1284)
- 1341 – Juliana Falconieri, Italian nun and saint (born 1270)
- 1364 – Elisenda of Montcada, queen consort and regent of Aragon (born 1292)
- 1504 – Bernhard Walther, German astronomer and humanist (born 1430)
- 1542 – Leo Jud, Swiss theologian and reformer (born 1482)
- 1545 – Abraomas Kulvietis, Lithuanian Lutheran lawyer and jurist (born 1509)
- 1567 – Anna of Brandenburg, Duchess of Mecklenburg (born 1507)

=== 1601–1900 ===
- 1608 – Alberico Gentili, Italian lawyer and jurist (born 1551)
- 1650 – Matthäus Merian, Swiss-German engraver and publisher (born 1593)
- 1747 – Alessandro Marcello, Italian composer and educator (born 1669)
- 1747 – Nader Shah, Persian leader (born 1688)
- 1762 – Johann Ernst Eberlin, German organist and composer (born 1702)
- 1768 – Benjamin Tasker Sr., American soldier and politician, 10th Colonial Governor of Maryland (born 1690)
- 1786 – Nathanael Greene, American general (born 1742)
- 1805 – Louis-Jean-François Lagrenée, French painter and educator (born 1724)
- 1820 – Joseph Banks, English botanist and author (born 1743)
- 1844 – Étienne Geoffroy Saint-Hilaire, French zoologist and biologist (born 1772)
- 1864 – Sarah Rosetta Wakeman, American soldier (born 1843)
- 1865 – Evangelos Zappas, Greek-Romanian businessman and philanthropist (born 1800)
- 1867 – Miguel Miramón, Unconstitutional president of Mexico, 1859-1860 (born 1832)
- 1867 – Maximilian I of Mexico (born 1832)
- 1874 – Ferdinand Stoliczka, Moravian palaeontologist and ornithologist (born 1838)
- 1884 – Juan Bautista Alberdi, Argentinian-French politician and diplomat (born 1810)

=== 1901–present ===
- 1903 – Herbert Vaughan, English cardinal (born 1832)
- 1918 – Francesco Baracca, Italian fighter pilot (born 1888)
- 1921 – Ramón López Velarde, Mexican poet and author (born 1888)
- 1922 – Hitachiyama Taniemon, Japanese sumo wrestler, the 19th Yokozuna (born 1874)
- 1930 – John Mackenzie Moore, Canadian architect (b. 1857)
- 1932 – Sol Plaatje, South African journalist and activist (born 1876)
- 1937 – J. M. Barrie, Scottish novelist and playwright (born 1860)
- 1939 – Grace Abbott, American social worker and activist (born 1878)
- 1940 – Maurice Jaubert, French composer and conductor (born 1900)
- 1941 – C. V. Hartman, Swiss botanist and anthropologist (born 1862)
- 1941 – Otto Hirsch, German jurist and politician (born 1885)
- 1949 – Syed Zafarul Hasan, Indian philosopher and academic (born 1885)
- 1951 – Angelos Sikelianos, Greek poet and playwright (born 1884)
- 1953 – Ethel Rosenberg, American spy (born 1915)
- 1953 – Julius Rosenberg, American spy (born 1918)
- 1956 – Thomas J. Watson, American businessman (born 1874)
- 1962 – Frank Borzage, American film director and actor (born 1894)
- 1966 – Ed Wynn, American actor and comedian (born 1886)
- 1968 – James Joseph Sweeney, American bishop (born 1898)
- 1973 – Marie Vieux-Chauvet, Haitian writer (born 1916)
- 1975 – Sam Giancana, American mob boss (born 1908)
- 1977 – Ali Shariati, Iranian sociologist and philosopher (born 1933)
- 1979 – Paul Popenoe, American explorer and scholar, founded Relationship counseling (born 1888)
- 1981 – Anya Phillips, Chinese-American band manager (born 1955)
- 1981 – Subhash Mukherjee, Indian scientist and physician who created India's first, and the world's second, child using in-vitro fertilisation (born 1931)
- 1984 – Lee Krasner, American painter and educator (born 1908)
- 1986 – Len Bias, American basketball player (born 1963)
- 1987 – Margaret Carver Leighton, American author (born 1896)
- 1988 – Fernand Seguin, Canadian biochemist and academic (born 1922)
- 1988 – Gladys Spellman, American lawyer and politician (born 1918)
- 1989 – Betti Alver, Estonian author and poet (born 1906)
- 1990 – George Addes, American trade union leader, co-founded United Automobile Workers (born 1911)
- 1990 – Isobel Andrews, New Zealand writer (born 1905)
- 1991 – Jean Arthur, American actress (born 1900)
- 1993 – William Golding, British novelist, playwright, and poet, Nobel Prize laureate (born 1911)
- 1995 – Peter Townsend, Burmese-English captain and pilot (born 1914)
- 2001 – Stanley Mosk, American lawyer, jurist, and politician (born 1912)
- 2001 – John Heyer, Australian director and producer (born 1916)
- 2004 – Clayton Kirkpatrick, journalist and newspaper editor (born 1915)
- 2007 – Antonio Aguilar, Mexican singer-songwriter, actor, producer, and screenwriter (born 1919)
- 2007 – Alberto Mijangos, Mexican-American painter and educator (born 1925)
- 2007 – Terry Hoeppner, American football player and coach (born 1947)
- 2007 – Ze'ev Schiff, Israeli journalist and author (born 1932)
- 2008 – Barun Sengupta, Bengali journalist, founded Bartaman (born 1934)
- 2010 – Manute Bol, Sudanese-American basketball player and activist (born 1962)
- 2010 – Anthony Quinton, Baron Quinton, English philosopher and academic (born 1925)
- 2010 – Carlos Monsiváis, Mexican writer, journalist and political activist (born 1938)
- 2012 – Norbert Tiemann, American soldier and politician, 32nd Governor of Nebraska (born 1924)
- 2013 – Vince Flynn, American author (born 1966)
- 2013 – James Gandolfini, American actor (born 1961)
- 2013 – Gyula Horn, Hungarian politician, 37th Prime Minister of Hungary (born 1932)
- 2013 – Dave Jennings, American football player and sportscaster (born 1952)
- 2013 – Filip Topol, Czech singer-songwriter and pianist (born 1965)
- 2013 – Slim Whitman, American singer-songwriter and guitarist (born 1923)
- 2014 – Oskar-Hubert Dennhardt, German general (born 1915)
- 2014 – Gerry Goffin, American songwriter (born 1939)
- 2014 – Ibrahim Touré, Ivorian footballer (born 1985)
- 2015 – James Salter, American novelist and short-story writer (born 1925)
- 2016 – Anton Yelchin, American actor (born 1989)
- 2017 – Otto Warmbier, American college student detained in North Korea (born 1994)
- 2018 – Koko, western lowland gorilla and user of American Sign Language (born 1971)
- 2019 – Etika, American YouTuber and streamer (born 1990)
- 2020 – Ian Holm, British actor (born 1931)

== Holidays and observances ==
- Christian feast day:
  - Deodatus (or Didier) of Nevers (or of Jointures)
  - Gervasius and Protasius (Catholic Church)
  - Hildegrim of Châlons
  - Juliana Falconieri
  - Blessed Michelina of Pesaro
  - Rémy Isoré
  - Romuald
  - Ursicinus of Ravenna
  - Zosimus
  - June 19 (Eastern Orthodox liturgics)
- New Church Day
- Day of the Independent Hungary (Hungary)
- Feast of Forest (Palawan)
- Juneteenth (United States)
- Labour Day (Trinidad and Tobago)
- Laguna Day (Laguna)
- Birthday of Jose Gervasio Artigas (Uruguay)
- World Sickle Cell Day (International)
- Anniversary of Kim Jong Il's commencement of work at the Workers' Party Central Committee (DPRK)
