= Raymond Douglas =

Raymond Douglas may refer to:

- Raymond E. Douglas, executive for the New York Times
- Raymond Douglas (artist), marine artist
