= Bruce Kennedy =

Bruce Kennedy may refer to:

- Bruce R. Kennedy (1938–2007), American businessman
- Bruce Kennedy (athlete) (born 1951), Rhodesian-American javelin thrower
- Bruce Kennedy (curler) (born 1948/49), Canadian curler
- Bruce Kennedy (television producer) (born 1970), American television producer, screenwriter, and director
