= Thomas Mooney (disambiguation) =

Thomas Mooney (1882–1942) was an American labor leader in San Francisco.

Thomas, Tom or Tommy Mooney may also refer to:

- Tom Mooney (baseball) (fl. 1908–1909), American baseball player
- Thomas Mooney (American chaplain) (1824–1877), American Catholic Civil War chaplain
- Thomas Mooney (Canadian chaplain) (1906–1944), Canadian Catholic WWII chaplain
- Tom Mooney (Canadian football) (1934–2014), American-born Canadian football coach
- Tom Mooney (footballer) (1910–1981), Scottish footballer (Airdrie, Newcastle, Morton)
- Thomas J. Mooney (Maryland politician), American politician who ran against William Donald Schaefer for Governor of Maryland, 1986
- Tom Mooney (rugby league) (born 1952), Australian rugby league footballer
- Tom Mooney (educator) (1954–2006), American labor leader and teacher from Ohio
- Thomas K. Mooney (1962–2007), American diplomat and Army officer
- Tommy Mooney (born 1971), English football player
- Thomas Mooney (footballer) (born 1973), Northern Irish footballer

== Other uses ==
- California Labor School (formerly known as Tom Mooney Labor School), American educational organization
