= Paul J. Smith =

Paul J. Smith may refer to:

- Paul Smith (composer) (1906–1985), American music composer
- Paul Smith (animator) (1906–1980), American animator and director
- Paul J. Smith (arts administrator) (born 1931), American arts administrator, curator and artist

== See also ==
- Paul Smith (disambiguation)
