= 2007 in ice hockey =

The following is a chronicle of events during the year 2007 in ice hockey.

== National Hockey League ==
- 2007 Stanley Cup: The Anaheim Ducks defeated the Ottawa Senators in five games to capture their first Stanley Cup. The Ducks became the first California based team to win the Cup, and the first Pacific Coast team since the Victoria Cougars in the 1925 Stanley Cup Finals.
- Operation Slapshot: Former Phoenix Coyotes assistant coach, Rick Tocchet, pleaded guilty to conspiracy, and promoting gambling. He was given two years probation.

== Canadian Hockey League ==
- The 2007 Memorial Cup was won by the Vancouver Giants, who defeated the Medicine Hat Tigers 3–1 in the final held at Vancouver, British Columbia. Vancouver shattered the previous Memorial Cup attendance record, as 121,561 fans attended the tournament, breaking the previous record of 84,686, set in Quebec City in 2003.
- Ontario Hockey League: The Plymouth Whalers defeated the Sudbury Wolves to capture the J. Ross Robertson Cup.
- Quebec Major Junior Hockey League: The Lewiston Maineiacs captured their first President's Cup by defeating the Val-d'Or Foreurs.
- Western Hockey League: The Medicine Hat Tigers won the Ed Chynoweth Cup for the fifth time after defeating the Vancouver Giants in seven games.

== International hockey ==
- Canada captured its third consecutive gold medal at the 2007 World Junior Ice Hockey Championships, once again defeating Russia in the final. The tournament was held in Mora and Leksand, Sweden. The United States captured the bronze medal.
- Canada defeated Finland to win the 2007 Men's World Ice Hockey Championships at Moscow, Russia. The Russians took the bronze.
- Canada also captured the gold at the 2007 Women's World Ice Hockey Championships, defeating the United States at Winnipeg, Manitoba. It was the 9th gold medal for Canada. Sweden won the bronze.
- The Canadian and Russian junior teams met in the 2007 Super Series, an event designed to celebrate the 35th anniversary of the 1972 Summit Series. Like the 1972 series, four games each were played in Russia and in Canada. Unlike 1972, the tournament was wildly one-sided with Canada easily winning the series with a 7-0-1 record.

== European hockey ==
- Russian Hockey Super League: The Russian national championship was captured by Metallurg Magnitogorsk.
- Elitserien: Modo captured the Swedish Elite League title.
- SM-liiga: Kärpät won the Finnish national championship.
- Czech Extraliga: Sparta Praha defeated Moeller Pardubice 4 games to 2 in the final series.
- Deutsche Eishockey Liga: Adler Mannheim won the German national championship.

== Women's hockey ==
Although the National Women's Hockey League and Western Women's Hockey League had nominally merged prior to the season, the Western squads did not face off against the Eastern teams, and no unified champion was declared.

The Brampton Thunder defeated the Montreal Axion to win the NWHL championship, while the Calgary Oval X-Treme captured their third consecutive WWHL title, and fifth consecutive league championship overall.

Following the season, the NWHL announced that the Eastern and Central divisions had suspended operations, leaving only the Western Division operational in 2007–08.

- Catherine White scored the first goal in the history of the Canadian National Women's Under 18 program (on August 23, 2007, in Ottawa, Ontario).

== Minor League hockey ==
- American Hockey League: The Hamilton Bulldogs won their first Calder Cup, defeating the Hershey Bears.
- ECHL: The Idaho Steelheads won the Kelly Cup, defeating the Dayton Bombers.
- United Hockey League: The Rockford IceHogs won the Colonial Cup for the first time. Following the defection of several teams to various other leagues, the UHL will reform as the International Hockey League in 2007–08 with six teams.
- Central Hockey League: The Colorado Eagles won the Ray Miron President's Cup for the second time in franchise history.

== Junior A hockey ==
- Canadian Junior A Hockey League:The Aurora Tigers of the OPJHL defeated the host Prince George Spruce Kings of the BCHL to win the 2007 Royal Bank Cup as Canadian "Junior A" national champions.
- United States Hockey League:The Sioux Falls Stampede captured the Clark Cup.

== Season articles ==
- 2006–07 NHL season
- 2006–07 AHL season
- 2006–07 ECHL season
- 2006–07 OHL season
- 2006–07 QMJHL season
- 2006–07 WHL season
- 2007–08 NHL season
- 2007–08 AHL season
- 2007–08 ECHL season
- 2007–08 OHL season
- 2007–08 QMJHL season
- 2007–08 WHL season

== Deaths ==
- January 3 - Earl Reibel, 76, Canadian forward (Detroit Red Wings), 1956 Lady Byng Trophy winner, complications of stroke.
- April 11 - Warren Strelow, 73, American goaltending coach for the US 1980 Winter Olympics gold medal team (Miracle on Ice).
- May 29 - Dave Balon, 68, Canadian player; multiple sclerosis.
- June 9 - Lorne Carr, 96, Canadian player for the New York Rangers and Toronto Maple Leafs.
- June 11 - Bobby Beaton, 94, Canadian player, professional boxer and boxing referee.
- July 11 - Jimmy Skinner, 90, Canadian coach (Detroit Red Wings).
- July 14 - John Ferguson Sr., 68, Canadian player, general manager, coach, and scout; prostate cancer.
- July 18 - Gary Lupul, 48, Canadian player.
- August 15 - Sam Pollock, 81, Canadian general manager of Montreal Canadiens, hall-of-famer.
- September 2 - Max McNab, 83, Canadian player, coach, and NHL general manager.
- September 6 - Martin Čech, 31, Czech international player; car accident.

== See also ==
- 2007 in sports
