= Hasen =

Hasen is a surname. Notable people with the surname include:

- Irwin Hasen (1918–2015), American cartoonist
- Jack Hasen (1942–2007), Canadian sailor
- Richard Hasen (fl. 1986), American legal scholar
