= Paul Smith =

Paul Smith may refer to:

== Arts ==
- Paul Smith (artist) (1921–2007), American typewriter artist
- Paul J. Smith (arts administrator) (1931–2020), American artist and curator
- Paul Smith (fashion designer) (born 1946), English Royal Designer for Industry
- Paul Smith (comics) (born 1953), American penciler and inker for Marvel
- Paul M. Smith (photographer) (born 1969), British photographer and educator

== Film, television and radio ==
- Paul Smith (animator) (1906–1980), American director of Woody Woodpecker cartoons
- Paul Smith (American actor, born 1929) (1929–2006), TV comic character, small parts in films
- Paul L. Smith (1936–2012), American hulking, frequently bearded actor
- Paul W. Smith (born 1953), American talk radio host in Michigan
- Paul Smith (Australian actor) (born 1968), starred in sitcom Hey Dad...!

== Military ==
- Paul F. Smith (1915–2014), American Army general
- Paul Ray Smith (1969–2003), American Army sergeant and Medal of Honor recipient

== Music ==
- Paul Smith (composer) (1906–1985), American film music composer
- Paul Smith (pianist) (1922–2013), American jazz pianist in Los Angeles
- Paul Tillman Smith, American drummer, songwriter, artistic director, band leader and promoter since the 1960s
- Paul Smith (music industry executive), British record label manager and art event producer since the 1980s
- Paul Smith (Christian music singer) (born 1953), American performer and songwriter
- Paul Reed Smith (born 1956), American luthier and founder/owner of PRS Guitars
- Paul Smith, American drummer in Los Angeles band Dengue Fever since the 1990s
- Paul Smith (English singer) (born 1979), songwriter and lead of indie rock band Maxïmo Park

== Science and academia ==
- Paul Althaus Smith (1900–1980), American mathematician
- Paul Smith (academic) (born 1954), English cultural critic and professor in America
- M. Paul Smith, English paleontologist and professor since 1990s

== Sports ==
=== Association footballers ===
- Paul Smith (footballer, born 1954), English midfielder for Huddersfield Town and Cambridge United
- Paul Smith (footballer, born 1962), Scottish midfielder and manager
- Paul Smith (footballer, born 1964), English right winger for Sheffield United, Port Vale and Lincoln City
- Paul Smith (footballer, born 1967), English right winger for Torquay United, Brentford and Bristol Rovers
- Paul Smith (footballer, born 1971), English midfielder for Gillingham and Brentford
- Paul Smith (footballer, born 22 January 1976), English midfielder and defender for Burnley, Hartlepool United and Sheffield Wednesday
- Paul Smith (footballer, born 25 January 1976), English midfielder for Lincoln City
- Paul Smith (footballer, born 1979), English goalkeeper at Southend United
- Paul Smith (footballer, born 1991), English defender at Chester City and Barrow

=== American football ===
- Paul G. Smith (1882–1971), college football and baseball head coach
- Paul Smith (defensive end) (1945–2000), NFL and AFL player with Denver Broncos
- Paul Smith (fullback) (born 1978), selectee in 2000 NFL draft
- Paul Smith (quarterback) (born 1984), player with Jacksonville Jaguars

=== Cricket ===
- Paul Smith (cricketer, born 1820) (1820–after 1846), English player from Sheffield, Yorkshire
- Paul Smith (cricketer, born 1964), English right-handed batsman for Warwickshire
- Paul Smith (cricketer, born 1975), English right-handed batsman wicketkeeper

=== Other sports ===
- Paul Smith (outfielder) (1888–1958), American with Cincinnati Reds
- Paul Smith (first baseman) (1931–2019), American with Pittsburgh Pirates and Chicago Cubs
- Paul Smith (racing driver) (born 1955), competitor in 1980 British Formula One Championship
- Paul Smith (rugby league) (born 1969), Australian wing for Penrith Panthers and Western Suburbs
- Paul Smith (drift driver) (born 1980), winner of 2012 British Drift Championship
- Paul Smith (boxer) (born 1982), English middleweight, super-middleweight and light-heavyweight
- Paul Smith (strongman) (born 1994), English strongman

== Writing ==
- Paul Gerard Smith (1894–1968), American screenwriter
- Paul Smith (Irish writer) (1920–1997), 1978 American Irish Foundation Literary Award recipient
- Paul Smith (historian) (born 1937), British researcher of Victorian England
- Paul Chaat Smith, Comanche author since 1980s and associate curator at National Museum of American Indian
- Paul Smith (television writer) (born 1961), British creator of TV series
- Paul Julian Smith, American historian of Hispanic studies and modern Spain and Mexico since 1980s
- Paul Smith (journalist), British football journalist since 1980s
- Paul Smith (blogger), British writer since 1990s and creator of Twitchhiker Project
- Dale Smith (writer) (Paul Dale Smith, born 1976), British writer and playwright

== Other fields ==
- Apollos Smith (1825–1912), nicknamed Paul, American founder of pioneering resort in New York's Adirondacks
- Paul Smith (clergy) (born 1935), African-American Presbyterian minister
- Paul M. Smith (born 1955), American attorney whose most notable case is Lawrence v. Texas
- Paul Fraser Smith (born 1958/59), New Zealand cannabis grower and advocate, a/k/a Gandalf the Green Fairy
- Paul Smith, founder of British motorist lobby group Safe Speed in 2001

== See also ==
- Paul Jordan-Smith (1885–1971), American journalist, editor and author
- Paul Smith's (disambiguation)
- Paul Smyth (disambiguation)
- Paul Smit (born 1953), Namibian politician and farmer
