= Kroon =

Kroon is a Dutch, Danish, Norwegian, and Swedish surname, from the Swedish "Kron" meaning crown. It may refer to:

- Estonian kroon, the former currency of Estonia
- Hollands Kroon, a municipality in the Netherlands

== People with the surname ==
- Ciro Kroon (1916–2001), Netherlands Antilles politician and Prime Minister
- Evert Kroon (1946–2018), Dutch water polo goalkeeper
- Helena Margaretha Kroon (born 1965), Dutch novelist and columnist
- Henk van der Kroon (born 1942), Dutch founder of the Federation of European Carnival Cities
- Karsten Kroon (born 1976), Dutch road bicycle racer
- Knut Kroon (1906–1975), Swedish football player
- Larry Kroon, American evangelical pastor
- Luuk Kroon (1942–2012), Dutch naval officer and Chief of the Netherlands Defence Staff
- Marc Kroon (born 1973), American baseball pitcher
- Marco Kroon (born 1970), Dutch soldier and recipient of the Military William Order
- Niclas Kroon (born 1966), Swedish tennis player
- Piet Kroon (1945–2021), South African chess master
- Robert Kroon (1924–2007), Dutch journalist
- Ron Kroon (1942–2001), Dutch swimmer
- Simon Kroon (born 1993), Swedish footballer

== See also ==
- De kroon der schande, a 1918 Dutch silent drama film directed by Maurits Binger
- Croon
