= Murray Sleep =

Canadian boxing official (1924-2003)

Personal information
- Full name: Murray Sleep
- Nationality: (Canada) Canadian
- Born: 1924; Minto, New Brunswick, Canada
- Died: February 3, 2003 (aged 79); Halifax, Nova Scotia, Canada

Sport
- Sport: Boxing

Murray Sleep (1924 – 2003) was a Canadian boxing official and a former member of the WBA Executive Committee.

== Early life ==
Murray Sleep was born around 1924 in Minto, New Brunswick.

== Career ==
Murray Sleep was the first person appointed to the Nova Scotia Boxing Authority in 1975. He served as a president of the Canadian Professional Boxing Federation beginning in 1979. He was re-elected for a second term at the federation's annual meeting on September 14, 1980. He was also re-elected for the 1981–82 term.

=== World Boxing Association ===
In 1980, he was a member of the World Boxing Association's executive committee and a supervisor of WBA title fights. In 1981, Murray Sleep became vice president of the World Boxing Association and was appointed as vice-chairman for championship ratings of the WBA in 1987 until 1993. He advocated for the appointment of Buddy Daye to the WBA's rating committee. He played a key role in securing Trevor Berbick a chance to compete for the Commonwealth title in Nassau in 1984. In 1986, he assisted in the launch of Hubert Earle's career as an international ring official with the WBA. During his tenure as a supervisor, he oversaw fights involving Ray Mancini, Riddick Bowe, Julio Cesar Chavez, Thomas Hearns, and Roy Jones Jr. In 1992, the WBA honored Sleep in a special ceremony in Nassau, Bahamas, as one of its longest-serving executive members.

Murray Sleep was inducted into the Canadian Boxing Hall of Fame in the builder's category in 1985.

== Death ==
Murray Sleep died on February 3, 2003, in Halifax, Nova Scotia, Canada.

== Honors and awards ==
- Inductee of the Canadian Boxing Hall of Fame (1985)
- Inductee of the Nova Scotia Sport Hall of Fame (2005)
