= Paul Smyth =

Paul Smyth may refer to:

- Paul Cranfield Smyth (1888–1963), English painter, founder of Finchley Art Society
- Paul Smyth (poet) (1944–2006), American writer and academic
- Paul Smyth (academic) (born 1947), Australian writer and professor of social policy
- Paul Smyth (footballer) (born 1997), Northern Irish forward

== See also ==
- Paul Smith (disambiguation)
