= Paul Smith's =

Paul Smith's or Paul Smiths may refer to:

- Paul Smith's College, a private college in New York
- Paul Smith's Electric Light and Power and Railroad Company Complex, a district on National Register of Historic Places in Franklin County, New York
- Paul Smith's Hotel, Brighton, New York
- Paul Smiths, New York, a hamlet and census-designated place in town of Brighton

== See also ==
- Paul Smith (disambiguation)
