= Norman Williams (RAAF officer) =

Royal Australian Air Force airman

Norman Francis Williams
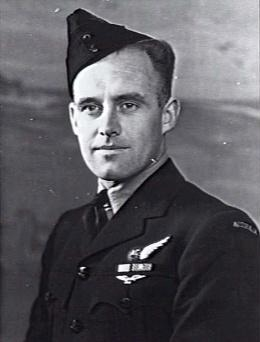
- Warrant Officer Norman Williams in 1943
- Born: 3 November 1914; Narrandera, New South Wales
- Died: 30 June 2007 (aged 92); Barham, New South Wales
- Military career
- Allegiance: Australia
- Branch: Royal Australian Air Force
- Service years: 1941–1948; 1952–1954
- Rank: Squadron Leader
- Conflicts: Second World War; Korean War; Malayan Emergency
- Awards: Conspicuous Gallantry Medal; Distinguished Flying Medal & Bar

Norman Francis Williams, CGM, DFM & Bar (3 November 1914 – 30 June 2007) served as an air gunner in Royal Australian Air Force (RAAF) bombers in the Second World War, becoming its most highly decorated non-commissioned officer. A rear gunner in a Halifax bomber, he was credited with shooting down 8 German aircraft and damaging several others, making him the RAAF's only "ace" who was not a fighter pilot.

== Early life ==
Williams was born in Narrandera, New South Wales, the eldest child of Elsie Mary Gibbs and William Francis Williams. He was educated on the family farm until the family moved to Leeton, New South Wales, where his father ran a garage. He attended St Joseph's Convent School and then the Catholic College run by the Marist Brothers in Sale, Victoria. He left school aged 16, and worked in Leeton.

== Second World War ==
He was working for the New South Wales Water Conservation and Irrigation Commission at the outbreak of the Second World War. He joined the Australian Army, and transferred to Royal Australian Air Force in May 1941. He became the top student in his air gunnery course, and left for England on the troopship Strathallan in March 1942. He became the rear gunner in the Halifax bomber piloted by Des Smith in No. 10 Squadron RAF in August 1942. He completed a tour of 30 missions, being decorated with two Distinguished Flying Medals, and then volunteered with his crewmates to become a Pathfinder with No. 35 Squadron RAF, flying ahead of the main force to mark targets.

His aircraft was severely damaged on a raid over Düsseldorf in June 1943, with his turret's rotation mechanism rendered inoperable and a wing on fire. While the crew prepared to bail out, the pilot heard Williams calling him to turn starboard, allowing his machine guns to bear on a closing German nightfighter, which blew up. The bomber dropped its bomb load, but was attacked by a second German fighter. With bullet wounds in his stomach and legs, Williams legs were paralysed, but he managed to shoot down the second fighter. The Halifax limped back to England, where it crash-landed. Williams was cut out of his turret, and spent several months in the hospital recuperating from his injuries. He was awarded the Conspicuous Gallantry Medal. He later said that he had been told he would have received the Victoria Cross if he had died.

He returned to Australia in April 1944, and was posted as a tutor at the air gunnery school in Cressy, Victoria. He refused to go, requesting an active posting instead. He became a belly gunner in an RAAF B-24 Liberator bomber in No. 23 Squadron RAAF, based in the Northern Territory and on Morotai.

== Later life ==
He joined the headquarters of No. 81 Wing RAAF in Japan after the war ended, as part of the occupying forces. By then a flight lieutenant, he was demobilised in May 1948. He returned to Australia, taking up a soldier's settlement block near Wakool, New South Wales on the Murray River, developing a rice farm which doubled as a nature reserve. He opposed a plan in the 1950s to drain Christies Creek, which ran through his farm, because it would adversely affect local wildlife.

He returned to the RAAF in 1952 with a short-service commission, serving as an air traffic controller during the Malayan Emergency and Korean War. He finally returned to Australia in April 1954, and resigned his commission as an acting squadron leader in September 1954.

He married Maisie Lamont in 1951. He died peacefully at Barham, New South Wales. He was survived by his wife and their three children.
