= Paul Smith (academic) =

Paul Smith (born 1954 in Eastleigh, England) is an academic and cultural critic. He holds a B.A. in Modern and Medieval Languages from the University of Cambridge and a Ph.D in American Studies from the University of Kent. He is currently Professor of Cultural Studies at George Mason University in Fairfax, Virginia, United States. His work covers many of the central themes of cultural studies, including feminism and gender studies, film studies, globalization and Marxist cultural criticism. He is elected vice-president of the Cultural Studies Association and was president of the Marxist Literary Group from 1988-1997.

== Bibliography ==
- Pound Revised (1983)
- Men in Feminism, edited with Alice Jardine (1987)
- Discerning the Subject (1988)
- Clint Eastwood: A Cultural Production (1993)
- Madonnarama: On ‘Sex’ and Popular Culture, edited with Lisa Frank (1993)
- The Enigmatic Body: Selected Writings of Jean-Louis Schefer (1995)
- Boys: Masculinities in Contemporary Culture, editor (1996)
- Millennial Dreams: Contemporary Culture and Capital in the North (1997)
- Primitive America: The Ideology of Capitalist Democracy (2007)
- The Renewal of Cultural Studies, editor (2011)
