= Inez Baskin =

American journalist and civil rights supporter

Inez J. Baskin
- Born: Inez Jessie Turner; June 18, 1916; Florala, Alabama
- Died: June 28, 2007 (aged 91); Montgomery, Alabama
- Occupation(s): Journalist and civil rights activist
- Known for: Sitting in front of Martin Luther King Jr. while covering the Montgomery bus boycott

Inez Jessie Baskin (June 18, 1916 – June 28, 2007) was an American journalist and civil rights supporter who covered the Civil Rights Movement and the Montgomery bus boycott for African American readers and publications.

== Biography ==
Baskin was born in Florala, Alabama, on June 18, 1916, to Cora Turner and Albert Lorenzo Turner.

When Baskin was two years old, she and her parents moved to Montgomery, Alabama. Florala, Alabama became too unsafe to reside in because of the Ku Klux Klan. There, she attended Booker T. Washington High School.

She married Wilbur Baskin in the Baptist Church.

After positions as a teacher and a typist, she became a journalist and reporter for the "Negro News" section of the Montgomery Adviser newspaper. In 1955, following the arrest of Rosa Parks, Baskin was hired by Jet Magazine and the American Negro Press to cover the Montgomery bus boycott and other, lesser known events that occurred in the black community.

Baskin was an active supporter of the bus boycott and the Civil Rights Movement, as well as a reporter of the event. She is most famous for riding one seat in front of Martin Luther King Jr. on a Montgomery bus during the boycott.

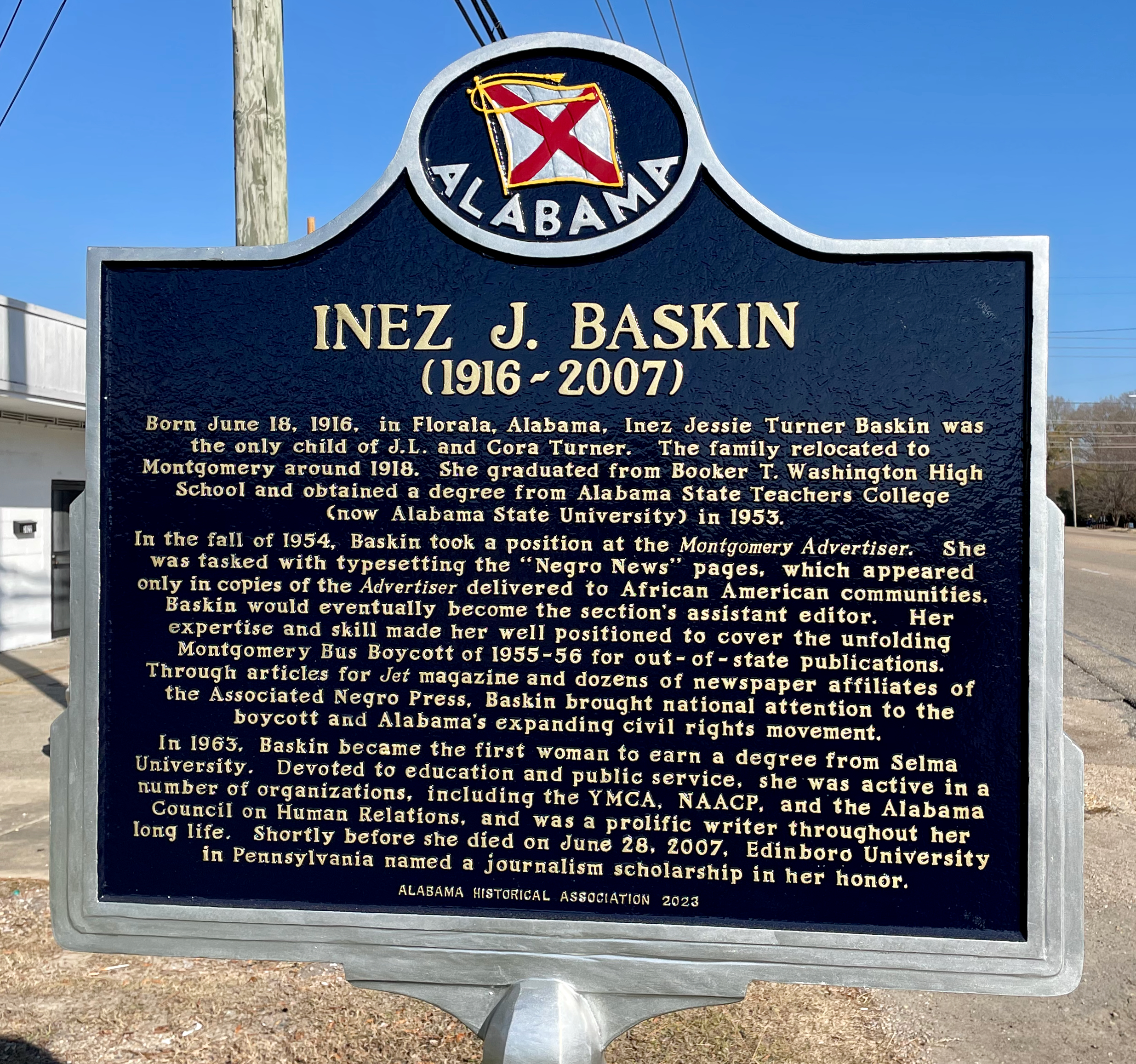
Historical Marker Photo on Inez J. Baskin

Baskin was known to support suffrage, having been photographed in a convertible, with a sign that declared her support for Young Alabama Democrats, and said that she was a registered voter.

Baskin graduated from what is now Alabama State University with an education degree. She received a degree in divinity from Selma University, and taught classes to ministers in theological schools.

She was a licensed social worker and a church pianist. She implemented Montgomery, Alabama's first Head Start program, as well as its first hot-lunch program for low-income children.

Towards the end of her life, Baskin was passionate about teaching young children about racism, and influencing them to grow up without hatred. She believed that hatred was taught, and that no one was born with it. She spoke to groups of children across the country about her experience in the Civil Rights Movement. Baskin continued to write until her death, writing her own quarterly newspaper, "The Monitor."

Baskin gave a keynote address at Edinboro University in Pennsylvania, in 2007. The same year, the university established a scholarship in her name, called the "Willie Mae Goodwine and Inez J. Baskin Scholarship of Journalism".

She died in Montgomery, Alabama, of heart failure, on June 28, 2007.
