= Jess Weiss =

American anesthesiologist and medical doctor

Jess B. Weiss
- Born: 1917; The Bronx, New York City
- Died: 28 June 2007; Fort Lauderdale, Florida
- Occupations: anesthesiologist and doctor

Jess B. Weiss (1917 – June 28, 2007) was an American anesthesiologist and medical doctor.

Weiss was best known for redesigning the shape of the epidural needle by adding a T-shaped set of wings. This allowed anesthesiologists and physicians to more easily guide the needle into the spine of the patient.

== External links and references ==
- Boston Globe: Jess Weiss, 90; redesigned an epidural needle
