= Hubert Earle =

Canadian boxing referee and boxing judge

Personal information
- Full name: Hubert Earle
- Nationality: (Canada) Canadian
- Born: Halifax, Nova Scotia, Canada

Sport
- Sport: Boxing

Hubert Earle is a Canadian boxing referee and boxing judge, born in Halifax, Nova Scotia, Canada. Earle's career has spanned from 1980 to the present. The Nova Scotian boxing official has judged hundreds of matches and reffed over 300 fights in local boxing rings and venues across the world. Earle was the first Canadian boxing referee to officiate a main bout at Madison Square Garden. He officiated Joe Calzaghe vs. Roy Jones Jr. in 2008.

== Early life ==
Hubert Earle was born and raised in Halifax, Nova Scotia, in Canada.

As a young man, Hubert attended boxing matches at the Halifax Forum, which was his inspiration to become a boxing official.

== Career ==
To become a referee, Earle spent three years working with Canadian boxing official Bobby Beaton, whom he refers to as a mentor. Hubert Earle's career as a boxing referee and boxing judge began in 1980. He refereed his first two bouts on the same night on September 24, 1980, at the Halifax Metro Centre (now Scotiabank Centre) in Halifax, Nova Scotia. A month and a half later, Earle judged one of his first bouts on November 11, 1980, at the Halifax Metro Centre.

Throughout the early 1980s, he officiated fights in Nova Scotia for notable fighters, including Cedric Parsons, Ricky Anderson, Dave Hilton Jr., Ralph Hollet, and others. He soon joined the Moncton Boxing and Wrestling Commission, his first work outside the province.

Earle refereed his first world championship boxing match in 1986 when Brian Mitchell TKO'd Alfredo Layne for the WBA World Super Featherweight title in South Africa at the Sun City Superbowl. During his tenure with the World Boxing Association, he officiated numerous world boxing championships. At the Bismarck Civic Center, he refereed the WBA title clash between Virgil Hill and Nigerian boxer Joe Lasisi. Earle signaled the end of the fight in the seventh round after Lasisi sustained unanswered punches.

He was appointed referee-in-chief for the province of Moncton in 1989 by the commission's chairman, Jerry Doiron-Gould.

His first WBA-sanctioned fight as a judge came in 1990, when Virgil Hill faced Tyrone Frazier for the WBA World Light Heavyweight title.

In 1994, he became the referee-in-chief of the Nova Scotia Boxing Authority, a provincial agency that regulates combat sports in the province. He later served as the organization's chairman.

Appointed chief official for the governing body known as the Canadian National Boxing Authority in 1995, he was tasked with refereeing various Canadian championship matches.

As the referee-in-chief and chairman of the Canadian Professional Boxing Federation's official committee, he hosted clinics for referees in 1996.

In the early 2000s, he had judged the likes of notable fighters such as Shane Mosley, Winky Wright, and Oscar De La Hoya. On November 20, 2004, he judged the Winky Wright vs. Shane Mosley II bout for the WBA/WBC Super Welterweight Championship at Mandalay Bay in Las Vegas, Nevada. Wright won by a majority decision, and Earle was the judge who called it a draw.

Named Nova Scotia's first combat sports director in 2006, Earle oversees everything from promoter negotiations to event sanctioning. The position was intended to ensure the health and safety of Nova Scotian athletes.

The New York State Athletic Commission appointed Earle as a referee in 2008. He holds the distinction of being the first Canadian referee to oversee a main bout at Madison Square Garden. On November 8, 2008, he officiated a world-title bout between Roy Jones Jr. and undefeated Joe Calzaghe in New York City.

Earle's officiating career spans from 1980 to 2022. According to BoxRec, the Nova Scotian boxing official has judged 100s of bouts and reffed over 300 bouts. He has officiated in local boxing rings and venues all over the world, including the United States, Germany, South Africa, Japan, Thailand, Mexico, the United Kingdom, Indonesia, Australia, France, Finland, Venezuela, Italy, Nicaragua, Panama, South Korea, and Ireland.

In 2020, Earle resigned from the World Boxing Association after 40 years as an international boxing official to work as the Director of Combat Sports and President of the ring officials in Nova Scotia.

== Honors and awards ==
- 2011 Nova Scotia Sport Hall of Fame inductee
- 2013 Sackville Sports Hall of Fame inductee
