= Harry Henshel =

Harry B. Henshel (February 5, 1919 – June 29, 2007) was an American businessman and the last member of the Bulova family to head the Bulova Watch Company, as president, chairman and chief executive officer.

== Personal life ==
Henshel was born in New York City on February 5, 1919. He graduated from Brown University and the Harvard School of Business. Henshel often participated in college track and field competitions in New York City during his college years, often serving as the timekeeper.

Henshel married Joy Altman on November 4, 1948, in New York City. The couple had four daughters. The Henshel family moved to Scarsdale, New York, in 1951.

Politically, Henshel supported both Republican and Democratic candidates. Henshel was once active in the local Scarsdale, New York Republican Party, served as chairman of Scarsdale's local chapter of the party. Henshel was a supporter of Republican presidential candidate, Wendell Willkie, during Willkie's failed campaign in the 1940s. Despite his Republican affiliation, Henshel attended the 1960 Democratic National Convention at which his father served as a Democratic delegate from New York.

Henshel was an avid horse racing enthusiast who raised thoroughbreds, including famous horses such as Shockproof. Henshel kept many of his horses at a stable in Ocala, Florida.

== Bulova ==
The Bulova Watch Company was founded as a jewelry store in 1875 in Manhattan's Financial District by Henshel's grandfather Joseph Bulova. By the mid-20th century, Bulova was the largest American maker of luxury and middle market watches. Henshel began work at Bulova following World War II after serving with the U.S. military. Henshel took over as president of the company in 1959, after the death of his uncle, Arde Bulova, in 1958. Henshel became the chairman of the watch company in 1974.

Bulova is credited with a number of innovations in watch making and time keeping. According to the Bulova website, the company introduced the world's first clock radio in 1928, and in 1931 began manufacturing the first electric clocks. In 1948 Bulova began developing the Phototimer, a unique combination of photo-finish camera and precision electronic timing instrument. The Phototimer was the first automatic timing device to be used in competitive sports.

Though Bulova was known as a luxury watchmaker, Henshel attempted to target the budget market soon after becoming president of Bulova. Henshel signed an agreement with Citizen Watch Co. of Japan in 1960 to create a line of inexpensive watches which were marketed under the Caravelle brand name. The move was a direct attempt to compete with the Timex Corporation.

Henshel's most successful product line was the introduction of the Accutron watch, an early electronic watch, in the 1960s and 1970s. The Accutron was different than previous watches as it did not contain a balance wheel or mainspring. The Accutron contained a battery-powered transistor circuit which sent impulses to a tiny internal tuning fork, which turned the watch's hands. The Bulova Watch Company guaranteed the Accutron to be accurate to within two seconds. The Accutron was a hit and a major innovative and financial success for the company. The Johnson Administration used it as a common gift. Ultimately, the Accutron mechanism was adapted for use in the United States space program, including on the Skylab Space Station. Accutron mechanisms were also left behind on the Moon to be used as part of a seismometer moonwalker, which transmitted lunar information back to Earth from the Sea of Tranquility.

Bulova did make a number of financial mistakes under Henshel in the 1970s, which cost the company some of its market share. The company saw digital watches as a fad. Bulova ignored the growing trend and did not introduce a digital watch line until 1975, five years after its competitor, Pulsar. The company also failed to build on the Accutron technology. Bulova failed to successfully market the newer quartz watch. Quartz watches were battery-powered and used a vibrating quartz crystal instead of an internal tuning fork, like the Accutron. This gave the quartz watches greater timing accuracy.

The Bulova Watch Company began to lose money in the 1970s. The company reported a loss in 1975. These loses caused Bulova to become a takeover target in the mid-1970s. First Gulf & Western Industries Inc. and the Stelux Manufacturing Company variously bought controlling interests in the mid-1970s. Henshel himself stepped aside as chief executive and president of Bulova in 1976, but remained chairman of the company. Finally, the Tisch Family-controlled Loews Corporation bought the company in 1979 turning Bulova into a private subsidiary. Under Loews, the Bulova began turning a profit again in the 1980s.

Additionally, as a director of its Board of Trustees, Henshel helped run a nonprofit school called the Joseph Bulova School of Watchmaking. The school was set up by the Bulova Company in 1945 to teach World War II veterans watch repair, and was supported by the Bulova Foundation. It not only taught the craft of watchmaking but also had a walk-in service to take in repairs and thus exposed the students to the business side of watchmaking. Interest in watch crafting declined and the school closed around 2000.

== Death ==
Henshel died of complications from kidney and heart disease at his home in Scarsdale, NY, on June 29, 2007. Funeral services were held at Westchester Reform Temple, of which Henshel was a member. He was survived by his wife, Joy, four daughters, and four grandchildren.
