= Pete Eberling =

American speed skater

Personal information
- Nationality: American
- Born: April 19, 1952 Vienna, Austria
- Died: June 24, 2007 (aged 55) Tarzana, California, United States

Sport
- Sport: Speed skating

Peter Martin Pete Eberling (April 19, 1952 – June 24, 2007) was an American speed skater. He competed in one event (500 meters) at the 1972 Winter Olympics.
