= Raymond Douglas (artist) =

Marine artist

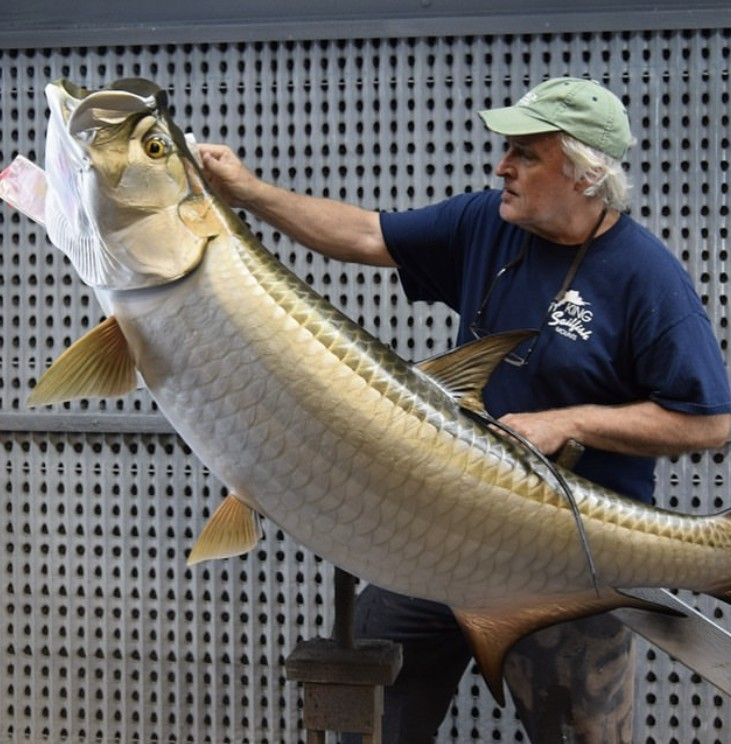
Raymond Douglas airbrushing a tarpon mount.

Raymond Douglas is a marine artist and founder of King Sailfish Mounts, Inc. In the early 1990s, King Sailfish Mounts introduced and began promoting the release mount concept for Atlantic sailfish.

== Career ==
Douglas' first saltwater fishing experience as a teenager was off the coast of Ft. Lauderdale in "Sailfish Alley" aboard Mike Zuro's 38-foot twin diesel "Nomad". On that day Douglas landed an 8-pound kingfish and was pressured into having it mounted, which turned out to be an unpleasant and unforgettable experience. Many years later, after witnessing the needless killing of two large bull sharks (which were never mounted) on a charter out of Palm Beach, Douglas decided to create a program that would promote the release of trophy game fish for mounting purposes.

Douglas realized that offering replica mounts (release mounts) might be a way to stop wasteful industrial taxidermy practices. At the time, many fishing charter businesses had arrangements with taxidermy outfits which would kick back big commissions to captains and crew, and trophy game fish were being killed annually by the metric ton.

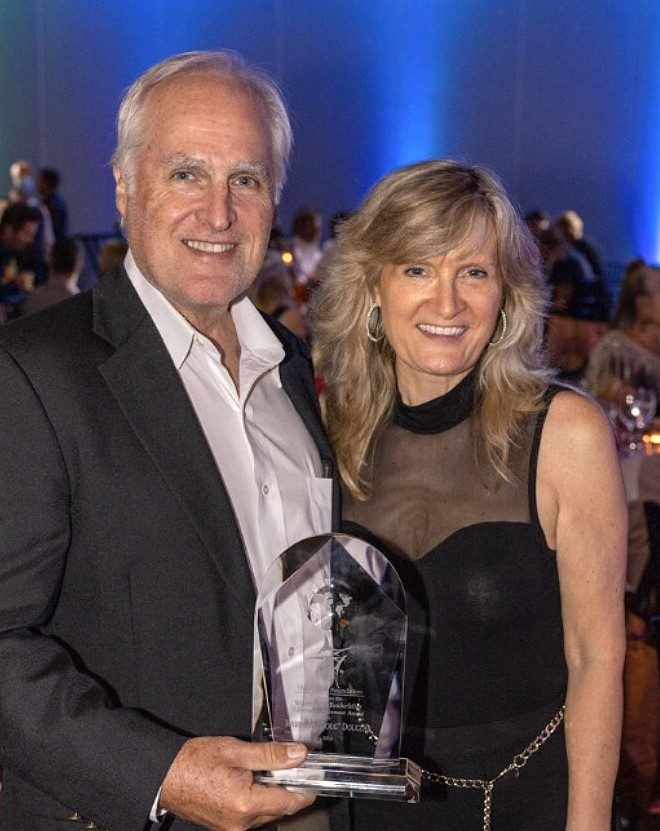
Raymond and Lisa Douglas

King Sailfish Mounts was the first company of its kind to exclusively promote the release mount concept. "I'm a Catch-and-Release Guy," remarked Douglas in an interview with Florida Fishing Weekly's Steve Kantner early in his career. Having no background in taxidermy, Douglas bought an airbrush and through trial and error began to learn how to airbrush multiple species of game fish. After hearing of his plans, Shelley Luckenbach of Guy Harvey Inc. invited Douglas to exhibit along with Guy and select others in a private sport fishing room at the 1993 Miami International Boat Show. The release mount concept quickly gained momentum as an alternative to traditional taxidermy.

Over the years Douglas has encouraged anglers to bring in overall length measurements, photos and other information about the released fish, such as the number of spots on a redfish, which are then incorporated into the mount.

On July 1, 2022, after 30 years, Douglas sold King Sailfish Mounts.

Dr. Ellen Peel, president of The Billfish Foundation, had confirmed that "KSM revolutionized the fish taxidermy industry into a conservation platform.

== Notable mounts ==
Though his company has produced replicas of numerous varieties of fish, sailfish remain the top selling mount. Douglas' portfolio of mounts includes a replica of a 13-pound bonefish landed by Andy Mill, Jim Holland, Jr.'s 202.5-pound tarpon (certified as the first tarpon over 200 pounds caught on fly), a replica of Alfred C. Glassell Jr.'s 1,560-pound black marlin, a replica of Louis Marron's 1,182-pound world record broadbill swordfish and a replica of a five-foot coelacanth.

== Awards ==
- 2023: The Billfish Foundation's "Winthrop P. Rockefeller Lifetime Achievement" Award.
- 2014: International Game Fish Association's "Conservation" Award.
- 2008: Coastal Conservation Association of Florida, Palm Beach Chapter's "Conservationist of the Year" Award.
