= New Church Day =

Holiday celebrated by the New Church

The nineteenth day of June is celebrated as a holiday by some branches of the New Church. The holiday commemorates events reported by Emanuel Swedenborg in the work True Christian Religion and it is considered by some to be the "birthday" of the New Church.

== Origin ==
In True Christian Religion, paragraph 791, Swedenborg states:

"After this work was finished, the Lord called together His twelve disciples, who followed Him in the world; and the next day He sent them forth into the whole spiritual world to preach the Gospel that the Lord God Jesus Christ reigns, whose kingdom shall be for ever and ever, according to the prediction of Daniel, chapter 7:3, 14; and in the Revelation 11:15; and also that:

'They are blessed who come unto the marriage supper of the Lamb,' Rev. 19:9.

This took place on the 19th day of June, in the year 1770.

This is meant by these words of the Lord, 'He shall send His angels ... and they shall gather together His elect ... from one end of the heavens to the other.' Matt. 24:31."

== History ==
The first New Church place of worship was dedicated on the 19th day of June, 1791, in Birmingham, England. The auspiciousness of this date was noted at the time.

From the early days of the New Church some sought to institute a new calendrical system, taking June 19, 1770 as its starting point. A number of New Church books and periodicals adopted this system.

In 1810, the Society for Printing and Publishing the Theological Writings of the Hon. Emanuel Swedenborg (afterwards known as "The Swedenborg Society") was first organized, and the date of June 19 was chosen for their annual anniversary celebrations.

Because of its significance to the New Church, the 19th of June was chosen in 1850 for the laying of the cornerstone of the first building of Urbana University, the first New Church institution of higher learning in the United States. That date was thereafter celebrated as “Foundation Day” by the University.

The Abington, Massachusetts Society chose June 19 for the dedication of their new temple in 1857.

In Early Prayer Books in America, John Wright notes Frank Sewall's 1867 Prayer Book and Hymnal for the use of the New Church (second edition: The Newchurchman's Prayer Book and Hymnal, 1884) which includes a New Church feast day on June 19 for the Sending of the Twelve Apostles.

New Church Day was first celebrated as an annual holiday in the Academy of the New Church and in the General Church of the New Jerusalem after the former was first organized on 19 June 1876.

The holiday has been the occasion for religious services, pageants, banquets, picnics, and the exchange of June Nineteenth cards and gifts.
