= Nova Scotia Combat Sports Authority =

Sanctioning organization for professional boxing bouts

- Abbreviation: NSCA
- Formation: 1975
- Purpose: Boxing and mixed martial arts sanctioning organization
- Location: Nova Scotia
- Region served: Canada
- Website: nscsauthority.ca

The Nova Scotia Combat Sports Authority (NSCA) is a provincial sanctioning body for professional and amateur boxing and mixed martial arts in Nova Scotia, Canada.

== Early history ==
Founded in 1975, the organization was originally known as the Nova Scotia Boxing Authority (NSBA).

It was first established by provincial legislation to regulate professional boxing. A later addition was amateur boxing, and with the rise of mixed martial arts, all combat sports were included.

An amendment was approved in May 1981, granting the boxing authority exclusive jurisdiction to oversee professional boxing as the only municipal boxing commission in the province.

== Present day ==
The authority falls under the Department of Communities, Culture, Tourism and Heritage. In 2017, a government bill called the Boxing Authority Act was amended by the 63rd General Assembly to substitute boxing with Combat Sports. The Nova Scotia Boxing Authority was renamed as the Nova Scotia Combat Sports Authority and a nine-member board was appointed.

The NSCSA regulates the licensing of fighters and promoters, annual medical examinations, medical procedures and suspensions, officials, referees, and ringside doctors, premises, facilities, and equipment, as well as other procedures and protocols for conducting combat sports events throughout the province.

Mickey MacDonald is the current chair of the Nova Scotia Combat Sports Authority.

== Chairmen ==
- Murray Sleep
- Bruce Stephen
- Hubert Earle
- Dick MacLean
- Bill Arsenault
- Mickey MacDonald
