= Bobby Beaton =

Canadian boxer

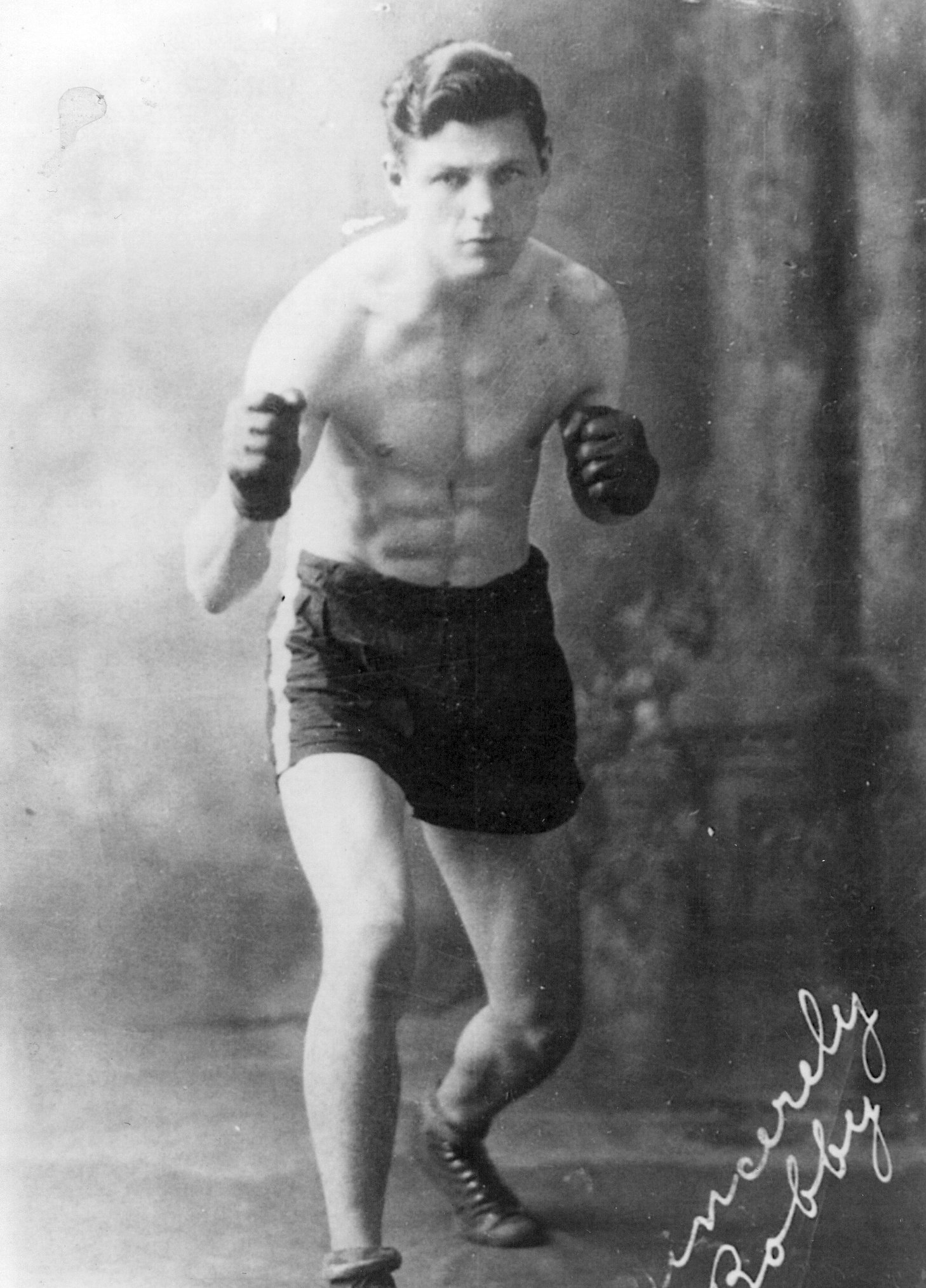
- Bobby Beaton at age 19

Personal information
- Nationality: Canadian
- Born: June 19, 1912 Port Hood, Cape Breton Island
- Died: June 11, 2007 (aged 94)
- Weight: Welterweight

Boxing career

Boxing record
- Total fights: 12
- Wins: 12
- Win by KO: 9
- Losses: 0
- Draws: 0
- No contests: 0

Robert Beaton (June 19, 1912 – June 11, 2007) was an Atlantic Canadian hockey player, boxer and boxing referee.

== Hockey ==
Beaton was born in Port Hood, Cape Breton Island and played hockey in Atlantic Canada in the early 1930s. He moved to England in 1938 to play for the Streatham Lions and Brighton Tigers, winning the European Championship in Berlin. The next year he played for the Falkirk Lions of Scotland. Returning home to Nova Scotia, Canada, he played and coached teams in Pictou, Truro, Stellarton and New Glasgow, winning seven A.P.C. (Antigonish, Pictou, Colchester league) titles, three Nova Scotia Championships and three Maritime titles in the 1940s and 1950s.

== Boxing ==
Beaton boxed professionally as a welterweight and his record was 12–0 with nine TKOs. In 1941 he began refereeing. Until his retirement in 1983, he officiated at over 500 boxing bouts, including 41 Canadian, five British Commonwealth and one World Championship. Beaton is credited with conceiving the three-judge system in boxing, now standard practice in the sport. He was Referee-in-Chief and Adviser to the Nova Scotia Boxing Authority from 1978 until 1994.

== Hall-of-Fame inductions ==
Beaton was inducted into the Canadian Boxing Hall of Fame, the Nova Scotia Sports Heritage Hall of Fame, the Pictou County Sports Heritage Hall of Fame and the Cape Breton Sports Heritage Hall of Fame.

== Other facts ==
- Beaton's great-grandson Evan Chambers, at age 17, represented Nova Scotia in boxing at the 2007 Canada Winter Games.
- Beaton was a mentor to Hubert Earle, Director of Combat Sports & Referee-In-Chief of the Nova Scotia Combat Sports Authority.
- Beaton lost the sight in one eye in a sledding accident at the age of three.
