= Birmingham New Jerusalem Temple =

First New Church place of worship

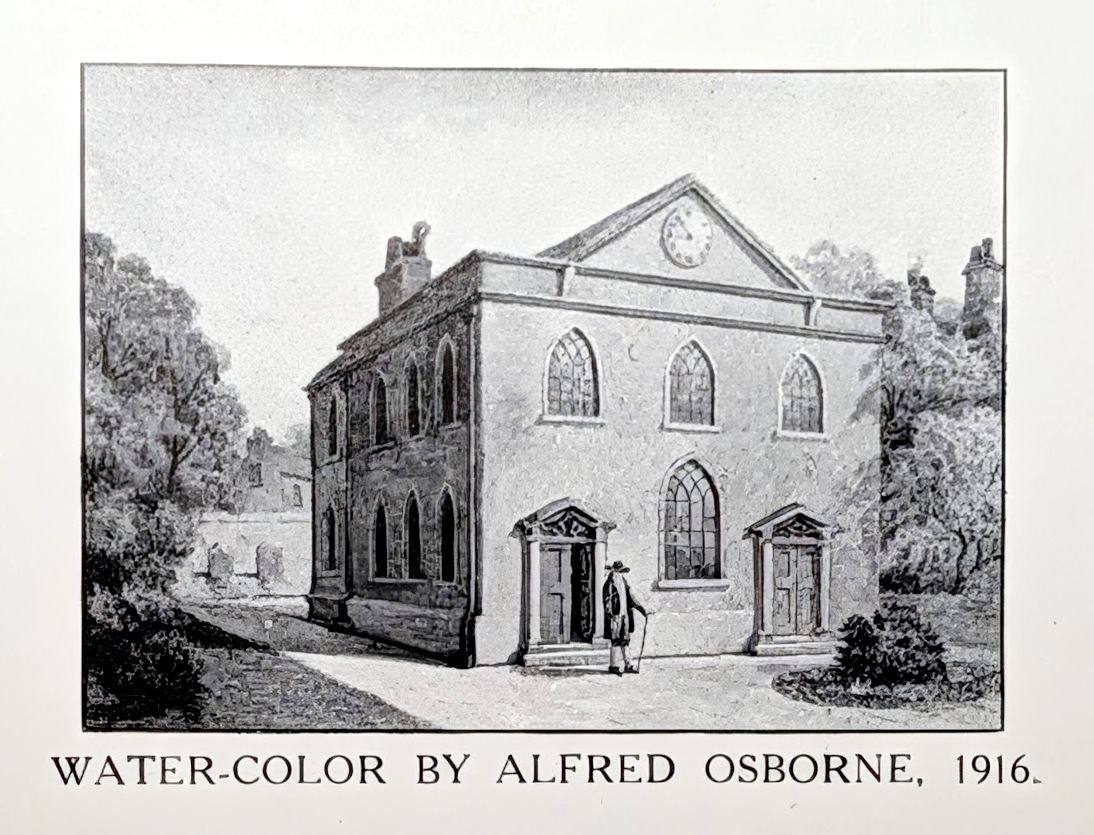
Scan of a picture on p. 23 of 1916 book: Early History of New Church in Birmingham

The New Jerusalem Temple in Birmingham, England, was a place of worship for members of the New Church (Swedenborgianism) in the centre of Birmingham, England. It was built from 1790 to 1791 and dedicated on 19 June 1791, and was the first place of worship built specifically for the purpose of New Church worship. It closed in 1793 following the bankruptcy of its founder, but the congregation moved to another building and subsequently to others in the city, the last of which closed in the 21st century.

== Background ==
At the time of the death of Emanuel Swedenborg (1688–1772), no New Church organisation had yet been formed, but a religious movement based on his writings gradually emerged. The New Church (also known as the New Jerusalem] Church) was founded in England in 1787, a priesthood was established, and the new sect got their dissenters' license. The church was one of several newly established Nonconformist groups to contribute to "a wave of chapel building" which characterised the period from 1790 to 1820. At first, members of the New Church worshipped in a rented chapel in the Great East Cheap neighbourhood of London. By 1789 there were "receivers" of the doctrine in places from Sweden to Jamaica, and a General Conference was held at the Great East Cheap Sanctuary, the representative from Derby being Samuel Hands.

== Birmingham ==
The revival and rapid growth of Nonconformity in England more widely in the late 18th century was in evidence in Birmingham, which had long been a hotbed of Protestant dissent. The year of the first General Conference was also the year of the first meeting in the city of receivers of the Heavenly Doctrines "for the celebration of worship and for spiritual improvement, in a room in Great Charles Street"; Birminghan's New Church congregation is thus said to have formed in 1789. By the time of the second General Conference, in 1790, Samuel Hands had moved from Derby to Birmingham, leased a property, and financed the building of a New Church "Temple" ("Templum" being the Latin word used by Swedenborg for a place of worship.)

Principles drawn from the New Church science of correspondences were employed in the design of the building, leading to the four-square floorplan and inclusion of many windows. According to John Bragg, a member of the church at that time, the wood from which the pews were made and their curved shapes reflected what was said in New Church teachings about the correspondences of heavenly worship.

At the third General Conference, Hands raised the question of whether or not it was appropriate for New Church houses of worship to be consecrated, the consensus being that it was. The new temple was duly consecrated on 19 June 1791. A New Church periodical of the time commented on the fact that this was exactly 21 years to the day after the date Swedenborg assigned (i.e. 19 June 1770) to the preaching of the everlasting gospel, throughout the spiritual world, "That the Lord God Jesus Christ reigneth, whose kingdom shall endure for ever and ever." The building, which stood on Newhall Street, was opened by Rev. Francis Leicester, formerly of Peterhouse (St Peter's College, Cambridge). Three services were held on the opening day. In his history of the New Church, Robert Hindmarsh noted the this temple was "the first of its kind erected in England, or in any part of the world", a claim which the Victoria County History of Warwickshire repeats.

== Subsequent events ==
The temple remained in use for only two years. Samuel Hands went bankrupt, and all of his assets, including the temple, an adjacent house, and an unfinished mansion on the other side of the temple, were auctioned on 4 June 1793. The auction of the temple included the building itself, its garden, and the pews, but none of the other internal fittings. The building was acquired by a congregation of Anabaptists who were described as Antinomian; they were recorded as using it by 1805 and possibly as early as 1803, when it was registered for worship with the name Zion Chapel. It was taken over in 1814 by a group of Particular Baptists from nearby Cannon Street Chapel, retaining the name Zion. It remained in use until its closure in 1904.

After the original temple closed, the New Church congregation moved to other premises on Newhall Street, where they remained until 1830. A building on New Church Street which was recorded as being in use as a Swedenborgian school in 1858 is said to have been used temporarily for worship as well until later in 1830 a replacement church opened on Summer Lane. The 1851 Religious Census recorded a congregation of 150. This church remained in use by the New Church until 1876, when it was replaced by the Wretham Road Church in Handsworth (formally registered in January 1877 in place of the Summer Lane church, which passed to Christadelphians). Wretham Road closed in 1974 and was replaced by a church elsewhere in Handsworth, whose registration was in turn cancelled in 2012.

== Bibliography ==
- Block, Marguerite Beck (1932). The New Church in the New World. New York: Swedenborg Publishing Association. ISBN 0-87785-126-3.
- Hindmarsh, Robert (1861). The Rise and Progress of the New Jerusalem Church. London: Hodson and Son.
- Schreck, Rev. E. J. E. (1916). Early History of the New Church in Birmingham. London: New-Church Press Ltd.
- Wakeling, Christopher (2017). Chapels of England: Buildings of Protestant Nonconformity. Swindon: Historic England. ISBN 978-1-84802-032-0.
