= Laurence Mancuso =

Laurence Mancuso (June 30, 1934 – June 10, 2007) was the founding abbot of the New Skete Eastern Orthodox monastic community in upstate New York.

== Early life and career ==
He was born Gabriel Richard Mancuso in Utica, New York in 1934. Mancuso was raised as a Catholic and joined the Byzantine Rite Franciscans in New Canaan, Connecticut 1957. He was ordained as a priest in December 1960 in Sybertsville, Pennsylvania by Bishop Nicholas T. Elko.

== New Skete ==
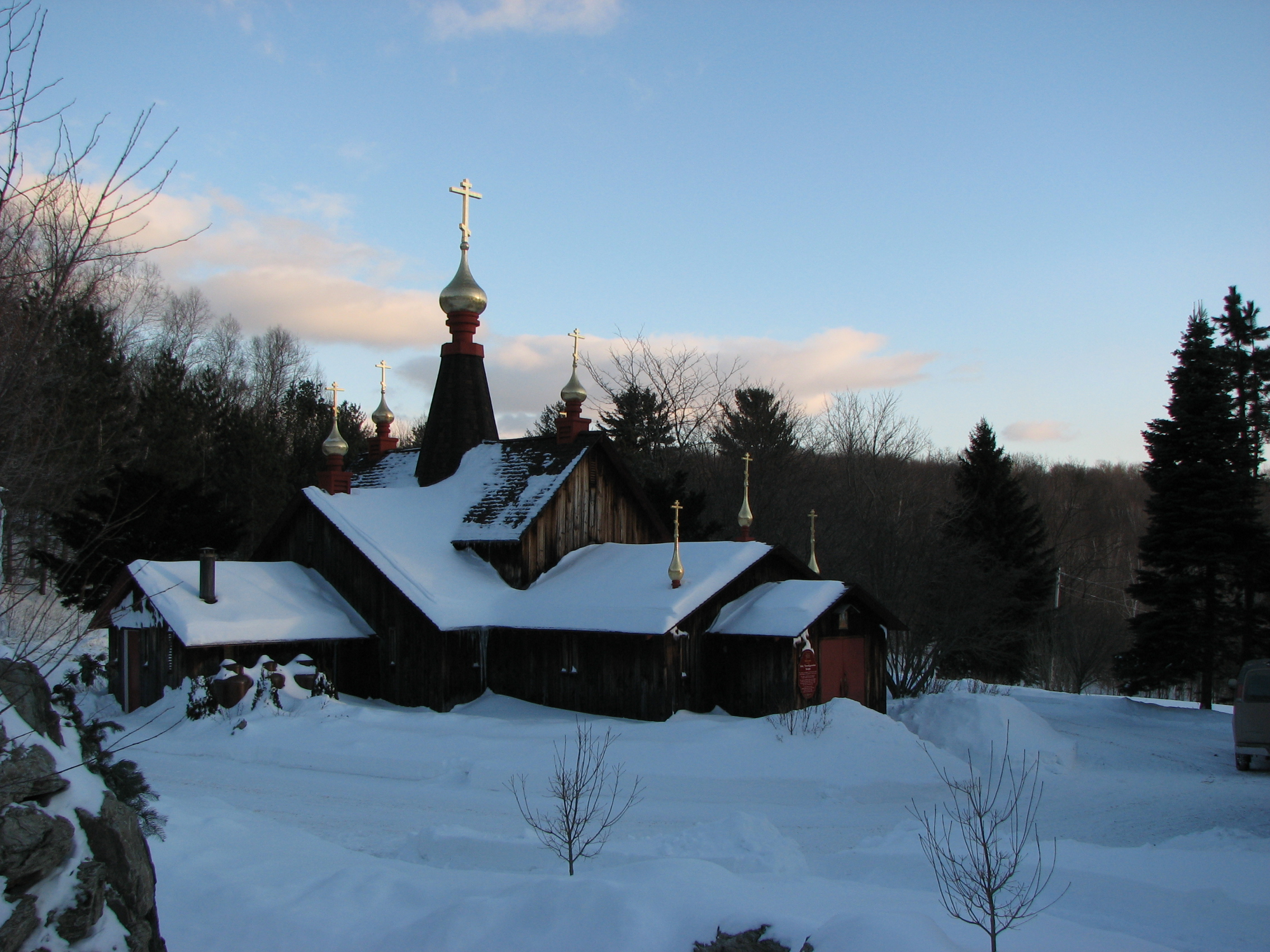
New Skete Monastery

Mancuso founded the Monks of New Skete in 1966 with six other monks in a farmhouse in Cambridge (village), New York. They built a new monastery nearby a year later and started a farm with livestock. Under his direction, the monks built a smokehouse and started selling farm produce under the name of New Skete Farms. The business also sold cheesecake made by the Nuns of New Skete who had joined the monks in 1969.

A dog kennel in New Jersey donated a German Shepherd dog to the monastery in 1969. It ran away and the monks acquired two others and started a breeding program under the direction of another monk but with Mancuso's approval. The puppies became highly popular and by 1998 there was a two-year waiting list for puppies costing $1,000 each. Pet owners were also paying the monks to train the dogs.

Under Mancuso's direction, the monks switched from being a Catholic order to an Orthodox order in 1979. He had been studying Eastern Orthodox theology for years before the conversion. Mancuso translated old Greek and Slavonic texts into English. He also converted church choral music into versions that could be sung by a few monks. He produced an English translation of psalms and published a collection of sermons called Notes from a Poor Monk.

The monks of New Skete have written a number of books on dog training. How to Be Your Dog's Best Friend published in 1978 is in its 40th printing and The Art of Raising a Puppy from 1991 is in its 26th printing.

== Retirement ==
Mancuso retired as an abbot in 2000 and went to live with his brother Norman Mancuso in Natick, Massachusetts. He was suspended from priestly functions, for unpublicized reasons, in the fall of 2000. In 2005, the suspension was lifted. He died as a result of injuries sustained in a fall in June 2007.
