= Nelson Levy =

Nelson Lévy (~1949 – June 3, 2007) was a leading figure in French Polynesia tourism and the founding head of Air Tahiti Nui, the national airline of French Polynesia.

== Career ==
Levy originally began reporting as a journalist in the 1970s. However, Levy soon changed careers and began working in French Polynesia's booming tourism industry.

In January 1992 Levy took over the management as head of Tahiti Tourism Promotion Office, which was the French Polynesia's main tourism marketing and information agency. Levy helped transform the office into the present day GIE Tahiti Tourisme. Tahiti Tourism is based in Papeete and currently operates a worldwide promotional and advertising campaign called, Tahiti and Her Islands. Levy left Tahiti Tourisme in August 1998 to become the first CEO of Air Tahiti Nui.

Levy helped found Air Tahiti Nui in 1996 as French Polynesia's international airline. The airline launched its first international flights in 1998, the same year that Levy became Air Tahiti Nui's first CEO. Levy helped to guide the international expansion of the airline while CEO and earned a reputation for his managerial efficiency. As CEO of Air Tahiti Nui, Levy was recognised in 2003 by Travel Agent Magazine as "Manager of the Year" in the Asia Pacific region.

Levy was very well connected in the tourism industry, as well as in French Polynesian politics. Levy was a prominent supporter of the Tahoeraa Huiraatira Party, a pro-French political party which opposes independence for French Polynesia from France. He was replaced as CEO of the airline when the coalition of pro-independence parties led by Oscar Temaru took power in a surprise election victory. However, Levy returned to the board of directors of Air Tahiti Nui following the 2005 presidential election win of French Polynesian President Gaston Tong Sang, a pro-French candidate from the Tahoeraa Huiraatira Party. Sang asked Levy back to help revive the ailing airline, which was suffering from "recurrent" financial shortfalls and problems. (The Government of French Polynesia is a 61.7% shareholder in the airline.)

Additionally, Levy also served as head of the local French Polynesian post and telecommunications company, OPT.

Levy's last tourism venture was the June 1, 2007, launch of easyTahiti.com, a specialist travel web site for Tahiti and other French Polynesian islands. EasyTahiti.com has been described as "Tahiti's biggest virtual travel agency" in a press release from Air Tahiti Nui.

== Death ==
Nelson Levy died unexpectedly of a heart attack on June 3, 2007, at his home in Tahiti, just two days after the official launch of easyTahiti.com. Levy had hosted barbecue for employees of easyTahiti.com at his home just hours before his death. His funeral took place in Papeete, Tahiti on June 6, 2007. Levy was survived by his wife, Vaea, and two daughters, Vaiarava and Poerava.

== See also ==
- Timna Nelson-Levy (born 1994), Israeli Olympic judoka
