= Thomas K. Mooney =

American diplomat

- Born: January 30, 1962
- Died: June 28, 2007 (aged 45); Cyprus
- Occupations: Army officer, Diplomat
- Known for: Disappearance and death in 2007

Thomas K. Mooney (January 30, 1962 – June 28, 2007) was an American diplomat and Army officer until his disappearance and death in 2007.

== Background ==
Mooney held the rank of lieutenant colonel in the United States Army. He was posted as a Defense Attaché at the U.S. embassy in Nicosia, the capital of the Mediterranean island nation of Cyprus.

He had been serving in Cyprus since June 2006, on his second posting to the country.

At the time of his death, Mooney was 45 years old, and he had a wife and two children.

== Death ==
After reportedly being last seen leaving the embassy midday on June 28, 2007, Mooney was reported as a missing person to Cypriot authorities after a day in which the embassy conducted its own search. Deutsche Presse-Agentur reported that "one colleague said he had been going to a fitness center at a Nicosia hotel", while another said Mooney planned to pick up somebody at the Larnaca International Airport. His car, a black Chevrolet Impala, was also missing.

A search on ground and by air included checks of ports, airports, and checkpoints along the ceasefire line with the Turkish occupied part of Cyprus. The search ended when Cyprus authorities found Mooney dead four days later about 150 yards from his locked car on a dirt road in the "foothills of the Troodos mountains", about 45 km (28 miles) southwest of Nicosia, in a remote area near the town of Lefka, first reported by Cyprus Broadcasting Corporation state radio. Mooney was identified conclusively from dental records.

Reports of the discovery of his body were confirmed by U.S. ambassador Ronald L. Schlicher. In a written statement to the media and posted on the embassy website, Schlicher said that "After the notification of next of kin, with deep sadness, I announce that LTC Thomas Mooney, who served his nation with distinction as our Defense Attaché, was found dead by Cypriot authorities on Monday. The cause of his death is being investigated, and any further information will be released as appropriate." Schlicher also announced the cancellation of a planned July 2 Independence Day reception. The State Department said Mooney's death was not connected to terrorism; State Department spokesman Sean McCormack said that "I wouldn't point you in the direction of an act of terror." Amb. Schlicher said that Mooney's death had "no political or security implications."

Agence France-Presse cited an official involved in the autopsy speaking anonymously as saying that Mooney's death was a suicide and he died due to hemorrhaging after stabbing himself in the neck; the official said that "there was no evidence of foul play whatsover" and that the body was in a state of decomposition. Cyprus police confirmed that Mooney died as a result of a neck wound but did not describe it as suicide, which is illegal in Cyprus.
