= Jack Hasen =

Canadian sailor

Jack Hasen (20 March 1942 – 14 June 2007) was a Canadian sailor who competed in the 1968 Summer Olympics. He was born in Windsor, Ontario.
