= Alberto Mijangos =

American painter

Alberto Mijangos (born July 25, 1925, Mexico City – June 19, 2007 San Antonio, Texas) was a Mexican-American artist and painter.

Mijangos was born in Mexico City. Mijangos dropped out of school in Mexico. However, he went on to study at the San Carlos Art Academy in Mexico City and the School of the Art Institute of Chicago. He witnessed Diego Rivera, considered one of Mexico's most successful artists, paint murals on the country's National Palace.

Mijangos moved to the city of San Antonio, Texas, sometime in the 1950s. His paintings were abstracts that dealt with social and spiritual issues. Mijangos began operating a small museum for the Mexican government in San Antonio, Texas, in 1959. The downtown San Antonio museum has since become known as the Instituto de Mexico en San Antonio. After leaving the Instituto, Mijangos ran the Blue Door Gallery, and later Salon Mijangos, a small art school with a gallery space on the south side of San Antonio.

Mijangos died on June 19, 2007, of lymphoma.

== External Links and References ==
- "Oral history interview with Alberto Mijangos, 2003 Dec. 5- 12". Archives of American Art. Smithsonian Institution.
- Alberto Mijangos Obituary (Associated Press)
- Alberto Mijangos Obituary (San Antonio Express-News)
- Discussion of Mijangos' "Chones" Series
- Discussion of Mijangos' "T-shirt" Series
- Art at Our Doorstep: San Antonio Writers and Artists featuring Alberto Mijangos. Edited by Nan Cuba and Riley Robinson (Trinity University Press, 2008).
