= Bruce R. Kennedy =

American businessman

- Born: October 11, 1938; Denver, Colorado, U.S.
- Died: June 28, 2007 (aged 68); Cashmere, Washington, U.S.
- Education: University of Alaska, 1963
- Occupation: Business executive
- Known for: CEO, Alaska Airlines
- Spouse(s): Karleen (Isaacson) Kennedy (m. 1965)
- Children: 1 son, 1 daughter
- Military career
- Allegiance: United States
- Branch: U.S. Army
- Service years: 1963–1965
- Rank: Lieutenant
- Units: Artillery, Fort Wainwright
- Conflicts: Cold War

Bruce R. Kennedy (October 11, 1938 – June 28, 2007) was an American businessman best known for his work as chief executive officer of Alaska Airlines between 1979 and 1991, where he presided over the expansion of the airline. He retired in the early 1990s to do humanitarian work before his death in 2007; he also served as a national leader in his church.

== Early life and career ==
Born in Denver, Colorado, Kennedy moved to Alaska as a teenager and graduated from the University of Alaska in 1963. Following graduation, Kennedy served as an artillery officer in the U.S. Army at Fort Wainwright near Fairbanks, where he met his wife Karleen. He later entered the real estate business before his company acquired Alaska Airlines when it was nearly bankrupt in 1972.

== Alaska Airlines ==
Kennedy became the CEO of Alaska Airlines in 1979. Annual revenue for the airline grew from $234.5 million in 1982 to $1.1 billion in 1991. He was largely responsible for the airline developing two routes to southern California, Russia, and Mexico. As well, he fostered the development of subsidiary Horizon Air.

== Humanitarian work ==
Kennedy retired in 1991 to undertake humanitarian work, and traveled to China to teach English and sheltered refugees in his house. He was the chairman of Quest Aircraft, which made aircraft for dangerous and remote locations and served on the boards of Christian organisations. He also served on the board of Alaska Air which was now based in Washington where he lived.

=== Leadership in the Presbyterian Church ===
Kennedy was a member of the General Assembly Council of the Presbyterian Church from 1993 to 1999. He was an elder in John Knox Church in Seattle at the time of his death.

== Death ==
Kennedy died in a private plane crash in central Washington, near Wenatchee, while arriving from Montana to visit his grandchildren. He was piloting his single-engine Cessna 182 without passengers when it crashed short of the runway in Cashmere.

The NTSB accident report determined that a wing clipped a group of pine trees while low on approach; sun glare was a contributing factor as the airplane was heading due west late in the day in early summer.
