= Raymond E. Douglas =

- Born: April 5, 1949; Honolulu, Hawaii
- Died: June 29, 2007 (aged 58); St. Augustine, Florida
- Known for: Corporate chief information officer with the New York Times

Raymond Edward "Ray" Douglas (April 5, 1949 – 29 June 2007), a graduate of Michigan State University, was an executive for the New York Times and is credited with helping to introduce color to its news pages and to adding new sections in the 1990s.

== Biography ==
Douglas was a veteran of the U.S. Air Force and received a Purple Heart during his service in Vietnam. He was a founding staff member of USA Today and was involved in the design and color systems for the Gannett Company when USA Today was launched in 1981.

He was the vice president for systems and technology for The New York Times Company, of which the newspaper is a part. He later became the corporate chief information officer. Douglas spent most of his career working with the computer systems that helped design and publish newspapers and was deeply involved in 1997 when the paper, making the broadest changes in its format since the 1970s, introduced a wide use of color in advertisements and photographs and added new sections, including separate weekday sports and arts sections. He died on June 29, 2007, in St. Augustine, Florida, from a pulmonary embolism.
