= Paul Smith (artist) =

Artist from the United States

- Born: September 21, 1921; Philadelphia, United States
- Died: June 25, 2007 (aged 85)
- Citizenship: American
- Occupations: Artist, Typewriter Artist, Chess Player

Paul Smith (September 21, 1921 – June 25, 2007) was an American typewriter artist.

== Biography ==
Smith was born in Philadelphia and suffered from severe spastic cerebral palsy from an early age. The loss of fine motor control of his face and hands made it impossible for him to attend school—or even eat, clothe, or bathe himself—and also made it difficult for him to express himself.

Smith never married and had no children. In 1967 he entered the retirement facility Rose Haven in Roseburg Oregon.

== Art and technique ==
Smith began creating typewriter art at age 11 after discovering a discarded typewriter from a neighbor's trash. Using his left hand to steady his right, he taught himself to create images using only ten symbol keys from the top row of the keyboard: @ # $ % ^ & * ( ) _. Since he could not press two keys simultaneously, Smith locked the shift key down to ensure symbols rather than numbers appeared on the page.

Smith's artistic process was meticulous and time-consuming. He worked approximately two to three hours each day while listening to classical music, with each piece requiring anywhere from two weeks to three months to complete. He developed techniques to create varied effects: different symbols produced distinct textures, adjusting the spacing between characters created depth, and moving the roller between lines controlled line spacing. With the introduction of color typewriter ribbons, Smith incorporated them into his work, and he would press his thumb directly on the ribbon to create shading effects, giving his pieces the appearance of pencil or charcoal drawings.

Over seven decades, Smith created hundreds of artworks depicting a wide range of subjects including landscapes, animals, religious figures, historical scenes, and recreations of masterworks such as Leonardo da Vinci's Mona Lisa and Emanuel Leutze's Washington Crossing the Delaware.

== See also ==
- Typewriter
- ASCII art
