= Robert Kroon =

Dutch journalist

Robert L. Kroon (1924, The Hague – 24 June 2007, Genolier) was a prominent Dutch journalist who reported on conflicts and other stories as a foreign correspondent from Africa, Asia and Europe for nearly 60 years.

== Career ==
Kroon began his work for the Associated Press in the years following World War II. His first reports for the AP came in 1949 during the Indonesian war of independence against the Netherlands. Kroon was expelled from Indonesia in 1952 by the country's military for, in his own words, "'inimical reporting' about a rebellion in the Indonesian Spice Islands." (which are now known as Maluku or the Moluccas)

Kroon began reporting as a foreign correspondent for Time magazine in 1953 following his expulsion from Indonesia. He was based in Geneva, Switzerland, during this time and also reported for Dutch news media outlets while at Time. Kroon reported on several important conflicts for Time magazine. Kroon covered the 1956 Soviet invasion of Hungary and the 1968 Prague Spring uprising. He also reported from the Belgian Congo as the colony gained its independence from Belgium in the early 1960s.

Additionally, Kroon went on to report for such major news centers as NBC and The Canadian Broadcasting Corporation, several Dutch and Belgian radio stations, as well as Benelux television broadcasters later in his career." Kroon always tried to work for a wide range of Dutch media while continuing to report for major international publications, according to Kroon's former boss, Dutch journalist Wibo van de Linde, who was Kroon's boss at Avro and Tros (a weekly news magazine on Dutch television) for 15 years.

Kroon continued to work as a contributor for the International Herald Tribune in Paris, France, throughout the 1990s. Kroon interviewed a wide range of political leaders and prominent entertainers throughout his career as a journalist. He counted Sukarno, Suharto, Charles de Gaulle, Frank Sinatra, Charlie Chaplin and Peter Ustinov among his most important subjects.

An endorsement by Robert L. Kroon has appeared in the book 22 Faces written by Judy Byington and published by Tate Publishing. This book is an account of Satanic ritual abuse and claims of MKultra conspiracy theories, demonic possession and salvation from occult sacrifice by divine intervention. The book was published long after Robert Kroon died, and many question whether Robert Kroon would endorse such a book.

== Death ==
Kroon was diagnosed with pancreatic cancer in January 2007. He stopped his daily reporting while undergoing cancer treatment in order to finish his memoir. His memoir, written in English and entitled "A Lifetime of News" was finished shortly before his death, according to news colleagues. The forward for his memoir was written by former Swiss President and U.N. adviser on sport, Adolf Ogi. Ogi writes, "In this book, Bob looks back on his youth in the Netherlands under Nazi occupation, the independence of Indonesia, and his reports for a U.S. weekly from countries behind the Iron Curtain, at a time when American journalists were not welcome there." His memoir has not yet been published as of July 2007.

Kroon had reportedly been responding well to his chemotherapy treatment. However, he was admitted to hospital on 20 June 2007 and died four days later in a hospital clinic near Lake Geneva. Kroon was 82. He was survived by his son and daughter, Peter Kroon and Tesa Kroon, as well as his partner, Yvonne Kilian.
