= Boxing at the 1954 Asian Games =

Boxing competitions

- Venue: Rizal Memorial Sports Complex
- Dates: 5–8 May 1954
- Competitors: 37 from 9 nations

The Boxing Tournament at the 1954 Asian Games was held in Manila, Philippines between 5 May and 8 May 1954. A total of 37 boxers from 9 nations competed at the competition.

The host nation dominated the competition winning five out of seven gold medals.

== Schedule ==
¼	Quarterfinals	½	Semifinals	F	Finals

Event↓/Date →	5th Wed	6th Thu	7th Fri	8th Sat
Men's 51 kg	¼	½		F
Men's 54 kg	¼	½		F
Men's 57 kg	¼	½		F
Men's 60 kg	¼	½		F
Men's 63.5 kg		½		F
Men's 67 kg	¼	½		F
Men's 71 kg				F

== Medalists ==
Event	Gold	Silver	Bronze
Flyweight (51 kg)	Ernesto Sajo; Philippines	Lee Chang-kyo; South Korea	Aye Kho; Burma
Bantamweight (54 kg)	Alejandro Ortuoste; Philippines	Hempala Jayasuriya; Ceylon	Kichio Miyake; Japan
Featherweight (57 kg)	Park Kum-hyun; South Korea	Mauro Dizon; Philippines	Chandrasena Jayasuriya; Ceylon
Lightweight (60 kg)	Celedonio Espinosa; Philippines	Henry Wong; Republic of China	Hiroshi Iwabuchi; Japan
Light welterweight (63.5 kg)	Ernesto Porto; Philippines	Lee Sam-yong; South Korea	Hisao Inoue; Japan
Welterweight (67 kg)	Kazuma Fujimoto; Japan	Bulat Bin Ismail; Singapore	Kim Yoon-seo; South Korea
Light middleweight (71 kg)	Vicente Tuñacao; Philippines	Yutaka Kobashi; Japan	None awarded

== Medal table ==
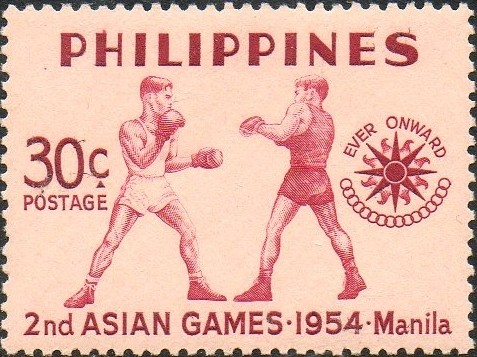
Boxing at the 1954 Asian Games on a stamp of the Philippines

Rank	Nation	Gold	Silver	Bronze	Total
1	Philippines (PHI)	5	1	0	6
2	South Korea (KOR)	1	2	1	4
3	Japan (JPN)	1	1	3	5
4	Ceylon (CEY)	0	1	1	2
5	Republic of China (ROC)	0	1	0	1
5	Singapore (SIN)	0	1	0	1
7	Burma (BIR)	0	0	1	1
Totals (7 entries)		7	7	6	20

== Participating nations ==
A total of 37 athletes from 9 nations competed in boxing at the 1954 Asian Games:

- Burma (1)
- Ceylon (2)
- Japan (7)
- Philippines (7)
- Republic of China (4)
- Singapore (4)
- South Korea (6)
- Thailand (4)
- Vietnam (2)
