= Boxing at the 1954 Asian Games – Men's 57 kg =

Boxing competitions

Men's 57 kg at the 1954 Asian Games
- Venue: Rizal Memorial Sports Complex
- Date: 5–8 May 1954
- Competitors: 6 from 6 nations

Medalists
gold medal	Park Kum-hyun	South Korea
silver medal	Mauro Dizon	Philippines
bronze medal	Chandrasena Jayasuriya	Ceylon

The men's featherweight (57 kilograms) event at the 1954 Asian Games took place from 5 to 8 May 1954 at Rizal Memorial Sports Complex, Manila, Philippines.

Like all Asian Games boxing events, the competition was a straight single-elimination tournament with a third place match to determine the bronze medalist. The competition began with a preliminary round on 5 May 1954, where the number of competitors was reduced to 4, and concluded with the final on 8 May 1954.

Park Kum-hyun from South Korea won the gold medal.

== Results ==
Legend

- KO — Won by knockout

Quarterfinals
Chandrasena Jayasuriya (CEY)	KO
Hidemi Wada (JPN)
Park Kum-hyun (KOR)	KO
Chune Pattapong (THA)

Semifinals
Mauro Dizon (PHI)	3
Teng Pao-cha (ROC)	0
Chandrasena Jayasuriya (CEY)	1
Park Kum-hyun (KOR)	2

Final
Mauro Dizon (PHI)	0
Park Kum-hyun (KOR)	3
Bronze medal bout
Teng Pao-cha (ROC)	0
Chandrasena Jayasuriya (CEY)	3
