= Boxing at the 1954 Asian Games – Men's 54 kg =

Boxing competitions

Men's 54 kg at the 1954 Asian Games
- Venue: Rizal Memorial Sports Complex
- Date: 5–8 May 1954
- Competitors: 6 from 6 nations

Medalists
gold medal	Alejandro Ortuoste	Philippines
silver medal	Hempala Jayasuriya	Ceylon
bronze medal	Kichio Miyake	Japan

The men's bantamweight (54 kilograms) event at the 1954 Asian Games took place from 5 to 8 May 1954 at Rizal Memorial Sports Complex, Manila, Philippines.

Like all Asian Games boxing events, the competition was a straight single-elimination tournament with a third place match to determine the bronze medalist. The competition began with a preliminary round on 5 May 1954, where the number of competitors was reduced to 4, and concluded with the final on 8 May 1954.

== Results ==
Legend

- TKO — Won by technical knockout
- WO — Won by walkover

Quarterfinals
Alejandro Ortuoste (PHI)	3
Kang Joon-ho (KOR)	0
Kichio Miyake (JPN)	3
Thanh Xuân Nhái (VNM)	0

Semifinals
Hempala Jayasuriya (CEY)	TKO
Austin Dunsford (SIN)
Alejandro Ortuoste (PHI)	3
Kichio Miyake (JPN)	0

Final
Hempala Jayasuriya (CEY)	1
Alejandro Ortuoste (PHI)	2
Bronze medal bout
Austin Dunsford (SIN)
Kichio Miyake (JPN)	WO
