= Boxing at the 1954 Asian Games – Men's 60 kg =

Boxing competitions

Men's 60 kg at the 1954 Asian Games
- Venue: Rizal Memorial Sports Complex
- Date: 5–8 May 1954
- Competitors: 6 from 6 nations

Medalists
gold medal	Celedonio Espinosa	Philippines
silver medal	Henry Wong	Republic of China
bronze medal	Hiroshi Iwabuchi	Japan

The men's lightweight (60 kilograms) event at the 1954 Asian Games took place from 5 to 8 May 1954 at Rizal Memorial Sports Complex, Manila, Philippines.

Like all Asian Games boxing events, the competition was a straight single-elimination tournament with a third place match to determine the bronze medalist. The competition began with a preliminary round on 5 May 1954, where the number of competitors was reduced to 4, and concluded with the final on 8 May 1954.

Celedonio Espinosa from the Philippines won the gold medal.

== Results ==
Legend

- KO — Won by knockout

Quarterfinals
Henry Wong (ROC)	2
Su Bung-nan (KOR)	1
Hiroshi Iwabuchi (JPN)	KO
Dennis Lazaroo (SIN)

Semifinals
Celedonio Espinosa (PHI)	3
Sueb Chundakowsolaya (THA)	0
Henry Wong (ROC)	2
Hiroshi Iwabuchi (JPN)	1

Final
Celedonio Espinosa (PHI)	3
Henry Wong (ROC)	0
Bronze medal bout
Sueb Chundakowsolaya (THA)	0
Hiroshi Iwabuchi (JPN)	3
