= Sri Lanka at the Asian Games =

- IOC code: SRI
- NOC: National Olympic Committee of Sri Lanka
- Medals Ranked 26th: Gold 13 Silver 14 Bronze 27 Total 54

Summer appearances
- 1951; 1954; 1958; 1962; 1966; 1970; 1974; 1978; 1982; 1986; 1990; 1994; 1998; 2002; 2006; 2010; 2014; 2018; 2022; 2026

Winter appearances
- 2017; 2025; 2029

Sri Lanka first competed at the Asian Games in 1951. Sri Lanka has won 54 medals across it participation at the Asian Games.

== Medal tables ==
=== Medals by Asian Games ===
Peach colour indicates best performance

Games	Gold	Silver	Bronze	Total	Rank
(India) 1951 New Delhi	0	1	0	1	6
(Philippines) 1954 Manila	0	1	1	2	10
(Japan) 1958 Tokyo	1	0	1	2	11
(Indonesia) 1962 Jakarta	0	2	3	5	11
(Thailand) 1966 Bangkok	0	0	6	6	15
(Thailand) 1970 Bangkok	2	2	0	4	10
(Iran) 1974 Tehran	2	0	0	2	12
(Thailand) 1978 Bangkok	0	0	2	2	18
(India) 1982 New Delhi	0	0	0	0	0
(South Korea) 1986 Seoul	0	0	0	0	0
(China) 1990 Beijing	0	2	1	3	18
(Japan) 1994 Hiroshima	0	1	1	2	26
(Thailand) 1998 Bangkok	3	0	3	6	15
(South Korea) 2002 Busan	2	1	3	6	21
(Qatar) 2006 Doha	0	1	2	3	36
(China) 2010 Guangzhou	0	0	0	0	0
(South Korea) 2014 Incheon	1	0	1	2	27
(Indonesia) 2018 Jakarta–Palembang	0	0	0	0	0
(China) 2022 Hangzhou	1	2	2	5	26
(Japan) 2026 Aichi–Nagoya	1	1	1	3	28
(Qatar) 2030 Doha	Future event				
(Saudi Arabia) 2034 Riyadh	Future event				
Total	13	14	27	54	26

== Asian Games Medals by sport ==
Leading in that sport

Sport	Gold	Silver	Bronze	Total
Athletics	12	7	13	32
Cricket	1	2	2	5
Golf	0	2	0	2
Boxing	0	1	4	5
Tennis	0	1	4	5
Sailing	0	1	1	2
Cycling	0	0	2	2
Karate	0	0	1	1
Totals (8 entries)	13	14	27	54

=== List of medalists ===
Medal	Name	Games	Sport	Event
Gold	Nagalingam Ethirveerasingam	1958 Tokyo	Athletics	Men's high jump
Gold	Lucien Rosa	1970 Bangkok	Athletics	Men's 5000 metres
Gold	Lucien Rosa	1970 Bangkok	Athletics	Men's 10000 metres
Gold	Wickremasinghe Wimaladasa	1974 Tehran	Athletics	Men's 400 metres
Gold	Wickremasinghe Wimaladasa; Sunil Gunawardene; Kosala Sahabandu; Agampudige Premachandra	1974 Tehran	Athletics	Men's 4×400 metres relay
Gold	Damayanthi Dharsha	1998 Bangkok	Athletics	Women's 200 metres
Gold	Damayanthi Dharsha	1998 Bangkok	Athletics	Women's 400 metres
Gold	Sugath Tillakaratne	1998 Bangkok	Athletics	Men's 400 metres
Gold	Susanthika Jayasinghe	2002 Busan	Athletics	Women's 100 metres
Gold	Damayanthi Dharsha	2002 Busan	Athletics	Women's 400 metres
Gold	National team: Lahiru Thirimanne Upul Tharanga Dinesh Chandimal Asela Gunaratne Shehan Jayasuriya Kosala Kulasekara Chathuranga Kumara Dilhara Lokuhettige Jeevan Mendis Ashan Priyanjan Ramith Rambukwella Alankara Asanka Silva Chathuranga de Silva Isuru Udana Kithuruwan Vithanage	2014 Incheon	Cricket	Men's team
Gold	Tharushi Karunarathna	2022 Hangzhou	Athletics	Women's 800 metres
Silver	M. A. Akbar	1951 New Delhi	Athletics	Men's Pole vault
Silver	Hempala Jayasuriya	1954 Manila	Boxing	Bantamweight
Silver	Nagalingam Ethirveerasingam	1962 Jakarta	Athletics	Men's high jump
Silver	Ranjani Jayasuriya	1962 Jakarta	Tennis	Women's doubles
Silver	Wickremasinghe Wimaladasa	1970 Bangkok	Athletics	Men's 400 metres
Silver	Ray Wijewardena; Ekendra Edirisinghe	1970 Bangkok	Sailing	Enterprise
Silver	Nandasena Perera	1990 Beijing	Golf	Men's individual
Silver	Sriyantha Dissanayake	1990 Beijing	Athletics	Men's 200 metres
Silver	Susanthika Jayasinghe	1994 Hiroshima	Athletics	Women's 200 metres
Silver	Anura Rohana	2002 Busan	Golf	Men's individual
Silver	Susanthika Jayasinghe	2006 Doha	Athletics	Women's 100 metres
Silver	National team: Chamari Athapaththu Nilakshi de Silva Kavisha Dilhari Imesha Dulani Vishmi Gunaratne Achini Kulasuriya Sugandika Kumari Kaushini Nuthyangana Hasini Perera Udeshika Prabodhani Inoshi Priyadharshani Oshadi Ranasinghe Inoka Ranaweera Harshitha Samarawickrama Anushka Sanjeewani	2022 Hangzhou	Cricket	Women's team
Silver	Dilhani Lekamge	2022 Hangzhou	Athletics	Women's Javelin throw
Bronze	Chandrasena Jayasuriya	1954 Manila	Boxing	Featherweight
Bronze	Rupert Ferdinands; Bernard Pinto	1958 Tokyo	Tennis	Men's doubles
Bronze	Bernard Pinto; Raja Praesody	1962 Jakarta	Tennis	Men's doubles
Bronze	Nirmala Dissanayake	1962 Jakarta	Athletics	Women's 200 metres
Bronze	Senarath Jayasuriya	1962 Jakarta	Boxing	Flyweight
Bronze	Ranjani Jayasuriya; Wendy Molligoda	1966 Bangkok	Tennis	Women's doubles
Bronze	Sria Gooneratne; Ranjani Jayasuriya; Wendy Molligoda	1966 Bangkok	Tennis	Women's team
Bronze	Lucien Rosa	1966 Bangkok	Athletics	Men's 5000 metres
Bronze	Lucien Rosa	1966 Bangkok	Athletics	Men's 10000 metres
Bronze	Trevor de Silva	1966 Bangkok	Cycling	Track cycling 800 m mass start
Bronze	Trevor de Silva	1966 Bangkok	Cycling	Track cycling 4800 m mass start
Bronze	Perera Wijayanim	1978 Bangkok	Boxing	Flyweight
Bronze	Caldera Hallesage	1978 Bangkok	Boxing	Bantamweight
Bronze	Sriyantha Dissanayake	1990 Beijing	Athletics	Men's 100 metres
Bronze	Damayanthi Dharsha	1994 Hiroshima	Athletics	Women's 200 metres
Bronze	Sugath Tillakaratne	1998 Bangkok	Athletics	Men's 200 metres
Bronze	Sriyani Kulawansa	1998 Bangkok	Athletics	Women's 100 metres hurdles
Bronze	Lalin Jirasinha; Krishan Janaka	1998 Bangkok	Sailing	Enterprise
Bronze	Rohan Pradeep Kumara	2002 Busan	Athletics	Men's 400 metres
Bronze	Rohan Pradeep Kumara; Ranga Wimalawansa; Prasanna Amarasekara; Sugath Thilakaratne	2002 Busan	Athletics	Men's 4×400 metres relay
Bronze	Rayappan Jebamalai Edward	2002 Busan	Karate	Individual kata
Bronze	Susanthika Jayasinghe	2006 Doha	Athletics	Women's 200 metres
Bronze	Rohan Pradeep Kumara; Rohitha Pushpakumara; Prasanna Amarasekara; Ashoka Jayasundara	2006 Doha	Athletics	Men's 4×400 metres relay
Bronze	National team: Chamari Atapattu Nilakshi de Silva Chandima Gunaratne Eshani Lokusuriyage Lasanthi Madushani Dilani Manodara Yashoda Mendis Chamari Polgampola Udeshika Prabodhani Inoshi Priyadharshani Inoka Ranaweera Maduri Samuddika Anushka Sanjeewani Shashikala Siriwardene Sripali Weerakkody	2014 Incheon	Cricket	Women's team
Bronze	Aruna Darshana; Dinuka Deshan; Pasindu Kodikara; Kalinga Kumarage; Pabasara Niku; Rajitha Rajakaruna	2022 Hangzhou	Athletics	Men's 4 × 400 m relay
Bronze	Tharushi Karunarathna; Nadeesha Ramanayake; Jayeshi Uththara; Lakshima Mendis	2022 Hangzhou	Athletics	Women's 4 × 400 m relay
