= Boxing at the 1954 Asian Games – Men's 51 kg =

Boxing competitions

Men's 51 kg at the 1954 Asian Games
- Venue: Rizal Memorial Sports Complex
- Date: 5–8 May 1954
- Competitors: 7 from 7 nations

Medalists
gold medal	Ernesto Sajo	Philippines
silver medal	Lee Chang-kyo	South Korea
bronze medal	Aye Kho	Burma

The men's flyweight (51 kilograms) event at the 1954 Asian Games took place from 5 to 8 May 1954 at Rizal Memorial Sports Complex, Manila, Philippines.

Like all Asian Games boxing events, the competition was a straight single-elimination tournament with a third place match to determine the bronze medalist. The competition began with a preliminary round on 5 May 1954, where the number of competitors was reduced to 4, and concluded with the final on 8 May 1954. The semifinals were held on 6 May 1954 and the next day was the rest day.

Seven boxers participated in this competition, Ernesto Sajo from the Philippines who had a bye in the first round beat Lee Chang-kyo of South Korea in the final by unanimous decision to win the gold medal.

== Results ==
Quarterfinals
Manzo Idehara (JPN)	3
Nguyễn Trường (VNM)	0
Lee Chang-kyo (KOR)	3
Suwan Somebunserm (THA)	0
Abdul Halim (SIN)	1
Aye Kho (BIR)	2

Semifinals
Ernesto Sajo (PHI)	2
Manzo Idehara (JPN)	1
Lee Chang-kyo (KOR)	3
Aye Kho (BIR)	0

Final
Ernesto Sajo (PHI)	3
Lee Chang-kyo (KOR)	0
Bronze medal bout
Manzo Idehara (JPN)	1
Aye Kho (BIR)	2
