= Boxing at the 1954 Asian Games – Men's 67 kg =

Boxing competitions

Men's 67 kg at the 1954 Asian Games
- Venue: Rizal Memorial Sports Complex
- Date: 5–8 May 1954
- Competitors: 6 from 6 nations

Medalists
gold medal	Kazuma Fujimoto	Japan
silver medal	Bulat Bin Ismail	Singapore
bronze medal	Kim Yoon-seo	South Korea

The men's welterweight (67 kilograms) event at the 1954 Asian Games took place from 5 to 8 May 1954 at Rizal Memorial Sports Complex, Manila, Philippines.

Like all Asian Games boxing events, the competition was a straight single-elimination tournament with a third place match to determine the bronze medalist. The competition began with a preliminary round on 5 May 1954, where the number of competitors was reduced to 4, and concluded with the final on 8 May 1954.

== Results ==
Legend

- TKO — Won by technical knockout
- WO — Won by walkover

Quarterfinals
Kim Yoon-seo (KOR)	3
Vichiam Chaiyapa (THA)	0
Kazuma Fujimoto (JPN)	3
Pablo Manique (PHI)	0

Semifinals
Bulat Bin Ismail (SIN)	3
Wing Yeung-yau (ROC)	0
Kim Yoon-seo (KOR)
Kazuma Fujimoto (JPN)	TKO

Final
Bulat Bin Ismail (SIN)
Kazuma Fujimoto (JPN)	TKO
Bronze medal bout
Wing Yeung-yau (ROC)
Kim Yoon-seo (KOR)	WO
