= Boxing at the 1954 Asian Games – Men's 63.5 kg =

Boxing competitions

Men's 63.5 kg at the 1954 Asian Games
- Venue: Rizal Memorial Sports Complex
- Date: 6–8 May 1954
- Competitors: 4 from 4 nations

Medalists
gold medal	Ernesto Porto	Philippines
silver medal	Lee Sam-yong	South Korea
bronze medal	Hisao Inoue	Japan

The men's light welterweight (63.5 kilograms) event at the 1954 Asian Games took place from 6 to 8 May 1954 at Rizal Memorial Sports Complex, Manila, Philippines.

Like all Asian Games boxing events, the competition was a straight single-elimination tournament with a third place match to determine the bronze medalist.

== Results ==
Legend

- KO — Won by knockout

Semifinals
Lee Sam-yong (KOR)	2
Hisao Inoue (JPN)	1
Ernesto Porto (PHI)	KO
Chen Sheng-hong (ROC)

Final
Lee Sam-yong (KOR)	0
Ernesto Porto (PHI)	3
Bronze medal bout
Hisao Inoue (JPN)	3
Chen Sheng-hong (ROC)	0
