= Boxing at the 1954 Asian Games – Men's 71 kg =

Boxing competitions

Men's 71 kg at the 1954 Asian Games
- Venue: Rizal Memorial Sports Complex
- Date: 8 May 1954
- Competitors: 2 from 2 nations

Medalists
gold medal	Vicente Tuñacao	Philippines
silver medal	Yutaka Kobashi	Japan

The men's light middleweight (71 kilograms) event at the 1954 Asian Games took place on 8 May 1954 at Rizal Memorial Sports Complex, Manila, Philippines.

Only two boxers from Japan and the Philippines entered in this weight, Vicente Tuñacao from the host nation won the gold medal by technical knockout when the Japanese boxer failed to answer the bell for the third round.

== Results ==
Legend

- TKO — Won by technical knockout

Final
Vicente Tuñacao (PHI)	TKO
Yutaka Kobashi (JPN)
