= Wrestling at the 1954 Asian Games =

- Dates: 1–3 May 1954

Wrestling was one of the sports which was held at the 1954 Asian Games in Manila, Philippines between 1 and 3 May 1954. The competition included only men's freestyle events.

== Medalists ==
Event	Gold	Silver	Bronze
Flyweight (52 kg)	Din Mohammad; Pakistan	Yushu Kitano; Japan	Basilio Fabila; Philippines
Bantamweight (57 kg)	Minoru Iizuka; Japan	Han Duk-hung; South Korea	Muhammad Amin; Pakistan
Featherweight (62 kg)	Shigeru Kasahara; Japan	Mansueto Napilay; Philippines	Kim Yung-jun; South Korea
Lightweight (67 kg)	Takeo Shimotori; Japan	B. G. Kashid; India	Muhammad Ashraf; Pakistan
Welterweight (73 kg)	Yutaka Kaneko; Japan	Abdul Rashid; Pakistan	Lim Bae-young; South Korea
Middleweight (79 kg)	Kazuo Katsuramoto; Japan	Nicolas Arcales; Philippines	Sohan Singh; India
Heavyweight (+87 kg)	Kenzo Fukuda; Japan	Baryalai Naseri; Afghanistan	None awarded

== Medal table ==
Rank	Nation	Gold	Silver	Bronze	Total
1	Japan (JPN)	6	1	0	7
2	Pakistan (PAK)	1	1	2	4
3	Philippines (PHI)	0	2	1	3
4	South Korea (KOR)	0	1	2	3
5	India (IND)	0	1	1	2
6	Afghanistan (AFG)	0	1	0	1
Totals (6 entries)		7	7	6	20

== Participating nations ==
A total of 32 athletes from 8 nations competed in wrestling at the 1954 Asian Games:

- Afghanistan (1)
- Ceylon (1)
- India (5)
- Japan (7)
- Pakistan (5)
- Philippines (6)
- Republic of China (4)
- South Korea (3)
