= Indonesia at the 1954 Asian Games =

- IOC code: INA
- NOC: Indonesian Olympic Committee
- Website: www.nocindonesia.or.id (in English)

in Manila
- Competitors: 85
- Medals Ranked 12th: Gold 0 Silver 0 Bronze 3 Total 3

Asian Games appearances (overview)
- 1951; 1954; 1958; 1962; 1966; 1970; 1974; 1978; 1982; 1986; 1990; 1994; 1998; 2002; 2006; 2010; 2014; 2018; 2022; 2026

Indonesia participated in the 1954 Asian Games held in the city of Manila, Philippines from May 1, 1954 to May 9, 1954.

== Medal summary ==
=== Medal table ===
| Sport | Gold | Silver | Bronze | Total |
|---|---|---|---|---|
| Shooting | 0 | 0 | 1 | 1 |
| Water polo | 0 | 0 | 1 | 1 |
| Weightlifting | 0 | 0 | 1 | 1 |
| Total | 0 | 0 | 3 | 3 |

=== Medalists ===
| Medal | Name | Sport | Event | Ref |
|---|---|---|---|---|
| Bronze | Lukman Saketi | Shooting | Men's 25 m rapid fire pistol | |
| Bronze | Gashmir Daud; Djie Soen Kion; Djie Soen Kwah; Benjamin Idris; Liem Siong Lien; Lim Sing Lok; Margono; Oen Teng Pie; Otman Siregar; Bunasir Surachmad; Tio Tjoe Hong | Water polo | Men's team | |
| Bronze | Thio Ging Hwie | Weightlifting | Men's Lightweight (67.5 kg) | |
