= Malaya at the 1954 Asian Games =

- IOC code: MAS
- NOC: Olympic Council of Malaysia
- Website: www.olympic.org.my (in English)

in Manila
- Competitors: 9 in 1 sport
- Medals Ranked 0th: Gold 0 Silver 0 Bronze 0 Total 0

Asian Games appearances (overview)
- 1954; 1958; 1962; 1966; 1970; 1974; 1978; 1982; 1986; 1990; 1994; 1998; 2002; 2006; 2010; 2014; 2018; 2022; 2026

Other related appearances
- North Borneo (1954, 1958, 1962); Sarawak (1962)

The Federation of Malaya competed for the first time in the 1954 Asian Games held in Manila, Philippines from 1 May 1954 to 9 May 1954.
