= Weightlifting at the 1954 Asian Games =

- Dates: 6–8 May 1954

Weightlifting was contested from May 6 to May 8 at the 1954 Asian Games in Manila, Philippines. The competition included only men's events for seven different weight categories.

== Medalists ==
Event	Gold	Silver	Bronze
Bantamweight (56 kg)	Yu In-ho; South Korea	Rodolfo Caparas; Philippines	Yoshio Nanbu; Japan
Featherweight (60 kg)	Nil Tun Maung; Burma	Rodrigo del Rosario; Philippines	Chay Weng Yew; Singapore
Lightweight (67.5 kg)	Cho Bong-jik; South Korea	Minoru Kubota; Japan	Thio Ging Hwie; Indonesia
Middleweight (75 kg)	Kim Chang-hee; South Korea	La See-yun; South Korea	Hachiro Fujiwara; Japan
Light heavyweight (82.5 kg)	Kim Sung-jip; South Korea	Muhammad Iqbal Butt; Pakistan	Harold de Castro; Singapore
Middle heavyweight (90 kg)	Ko Chong-ku; South Korea	Pedro del Mundo; Philippines	Joaquin Vasquez; Philippines
Heavyweight (+90 kg)	Maung Maung Lwin; Burma	Hong Chi-hua; Republic of China	Shih Ping-hua; Republic of China

== Medal table ==
Rank	Nation	Gold	Silver	Bronze	Total
1	South Korea (KOR)	5	1	0	6
2	Burma (BIR)	2	0	0	2
3	Philippines (PHI)	0	3	1	4
4	Japan (JPN)	0	1	2	3
5	Republic of China (ROC)	0	1	1	2
6	Pakistan (PAK)	0	1	0	1
7	Singapore (SIN)	0	0	2	2
8	Indonesia (INA)	0	0	1	1
Totals (8 entries)		7	7	7	21
