= Pakistan at the 1954 Asian Games =

- IOC code: PAK
- NOC: Pakistan Olympic Association

in Manila
- Medals Ranked 4th: Gold 5 Silver 6 Bronze 2 Total 13

Asian Games appearances (overview)
- 1954; 1958; 1962; 1966; 1970; 1974; 1978; 1982; 1986; 1990; 1994; 1998; 2002; 2006; 2010; 2014; 2018; 2022; 2026

Pakistan participated in the 1954 Asian Games held in the city of Manila, Philippines from 1 May 1954 to 9 May 1954. Pakistan ranked 4th with 5 gold medals in this edition of the Asiad. In these games however Pakistan got 4th Position, but an athlete Abdul Khaliq dubbed as "The Fastest Man of Asia".

== Medal summary ==
=== Medals by sport ===
Medals by sport
| Sport | Rank | Gold | Silver | Bronze | Total |
|---|---|---|---|---|---|
| Athletics | 3 | 4 | 4 | 0 | 8 |
| Wrestling | 2 | 1 | 1 | 2 | 4 |
| Diving | 6 | 0 | 1 | 0 | 1 |
| Total | 5 | 5 | 6 | 2 | 13 |

== Medallists ==
| Medal | Name | Sport | Discipline |
|---|---|---|---|
| Gold | Abdul Khaliq; The Flying Bird of Asia | Athletics (100m) | 10.6 sec |
| Gold | Muhammad Sharif Butt | Athletics (200m) | 21.9 sec |
| Gold | Mirza Khan | Athletics (400m) | 54.1 sec |
| Gold | Muhammad Nawaz | Athletics (Javelin) | 64.62 m |
| Gold | Din Mohammad | Wrestling | Fly Weight |
| Silver | Muhammad Aslam | Athletics (200m) | 22.0 sec |
| Silver | Abdul Khaliq, Muhammad Sharif Butt, Muhammad Aslam, Abdul Aziz | Athletics (4*100 m relay) | 41.5 sec |
| Silver | Jalal Khan | Athletics (Javelin) | 63.28 m |
| Silver | Muhammad Ibal | Athletics (Hammer Throw) | 51.80 m |
| Silver | Muhammad Iqbal Butt | Weightlifting | Lt. Heavyweight |
| Silver | Abdul Rashid | Wrestling | Welter Weight |
| Bronze | Muhammad Ashraf | Wrestling | Lightweight |
| Bronze | Muhammad Amin | Wrestling | Bantamweight |

== Football ==
Manager: (Pakistan) Khawaja Riaz Ahmed

| No. | Pos. | Player | Date of birth (age) | Club |
|---|---|---|---|---|
| | GK | Shamoo Abdul Ghani | | (Pakistan Football Federation) Karachi |
| | GK | Lt. Mazhar Siddique | | (Pakistan Football Federation) Pakistan Army |
| | DF | Sheikh Shaheb Ali | 1 July 1915 (aged 38) | (Pakistan Football Federation) Fire Service SC |
| | DF | Nabi Chowdhury | 1934 (aged 20) | (Pakistan Football Federation) Dhaka Wanderers |
| | DF | Riasat Ali | | (Pakistan Football Federation) Punjab |
| | DF | Abdul Haq | | (Pakistan Football Federation) Punjab |
| | DF | Muhammad Abdul Malik | | (Pakistan Football Federation) Punjab |
| | MF | Sumbal Khan | 1926 (aged 28) | (Pakistan Football Federation) NWFP |
| | MF | Niaz Ali | 1924 (aged (30) | (Pakistan Football Federation) Punjab |
| | MF | Taj Mohammad Jr. | | (Pakistan Football Federation) Balochistan |
| | MF | Ahmed Ali Phullo (Vice-captain) | | (Pakistan Football Federation) Balochistan |
| | FW | Masood Fakhri | 16 September 1932 (aged 21) | (All India Football Federation) East Bengal Club |
| | FW | Muhammad Amin | 1931 (aged 23) | (Pakistan Football Federation) Pakistan Air Force |
| | FW | Moideen Kutty (Captain) | 2 January 1926 (aged 28) | (Pakistan Football Federation) Pakistan Air Force |
| | FW | Jamil Akhtar | 1930 (aged 24) | (Pakistan Football Federation) Pakistan Railways |
| | FW | Muhammad Sharif | | (Pakistan Football Federation) Punjab |
| | FW | Ibrahim | | (Pakistan Football Federation) Karachi |
| | FW | Rashid Chunna | | (Pakistan Football Federation) Dacca |
| | | Afzal Khan | | (Pakistan Football Federation) Karachi |
