= Tunacao =

Tunacao is a surname. Notable people with the surname include:

- Malcolm Tuñacao (born 1977), Filipino boxer
- Vicente Tuñacao (born 1925), Filipino boxer
