= Lukman Saketi =

Indonesian sports shooter (born 1921)

Personal information
- Full name: Raden Lukman Saketi
- Born: 20 March 1921

Sport
- Sport: Sports shooting
Medal record
Men's shooting
Representing Indonesia
Asian Games
Bronze medal – third place	1954 Manila	25 m rapid fire pistol

Lukman Saketi (born 20 March 1921) is an Indonesian former sports shooter. He competed in the 25 metre pistol event at the 1956 Summer Olympics, coming in 30th, and 1954 Asian Games.
