= Hong Kong at the 1954 Asian Games =

- IOC code: HKG
- NOC: Sports Federation and Olympic Committee of Hong Kong, China

in Manila
- Medals: Gold 0 Silver 0 Bronze 1 Total 1

Asian Games appearances (overview)
- 1954; 1958; 1962; 1966; 1970; 1974; 1978; 1982; 1986; 1990; 1994; 1998; 2002; 2006; 2010; 2014; 2018; 2022; 2026

Hong Kong participated in the 1954 Asian Games held in the capital city of Manila, Philippines. This country was ranked 13th with 1 bronze medal.

== Medalists ==
Medal	Name	Sport	Event
Bronze	Stephen Xavier	Athletics	Men's 200 m

== Medal summary ==
=== Medal table ===
Sport	Gold	Silver	Bronze	Total
Athletics	0	0	1	1
Totals (1 entries)	0	0	1	1
