= Afghanistan at the 1954 Asian Games =

Sporting event delegation

- IOC code: AFG
- NOC: National Olympic Committee of the Islamic Republic of Afghanistan

in Manila
- Medals Ranked 11th: Gold 0 Silver 1 Bronze 0 Total 1

Asian Games appearances (overview)
- 1951; 1954; 1958; 1962; 1966; 1970; 1974; 1978; 1982; 1986; 1990; 1994; 1998; 2002; 2006; 2010; 2014; 2018; 2022; 2026

Afghanistan participated in the 1954 Asian Games held in the city of Manila, Philippines from 1 May 1954 to 9 May 1954. Afghanistan was ranked 11th with a solitary silver medal.

Afghanistan had sent a contingent of 17 athletes to this Asiad. The lone silver medal by Baryalai Naseri in the Men's freestyle wrestling (87+ kg category).

== Medalists ==
| Medal | Name | Sport | Event |
|---|---|---|---|
| Silver | Baryalai Naseri | Wrestling | Men's Heavyweight +87 kg |

== Football ==
Afghanistan sent its national football team for the event and was drawn in Group D against South Korea and Hong Kong. They lost back to back matches and was knocked out of the event in the first round.

| Athlete | Event | Preliminary Stage | | | Semifinal | Final / BM | Rank |
| Athlete | Event | Opposition Score | Opposition Score | Rank | Opposition Score | Opposition Score | Rank |
|---|---|---|---|---|---|---|---|
| Afghanistan Men | Men's tournament | South Korea; L 2–8 | Hong Kong; L 2–4 | 3 | Did not advance | | 12 |

4 May 1954

| South Korea | 8–2 | Afghanistan |
|---|---|---|
| Choi Chung-min 7'; Choi Kwang-seok 22'; Sung Nak-woon 23', 45', 55', 80'; Chung Nam-sik 42'; Chung Kook-chin 49' |

Rizal Memorial Stadium, Manila

6 May 1954

| Hong Kong | 4–2 | Afghanistan |
|---|---|---|
| Santos 28'; Chen Zhigang 35'; Lee Yuk Tak 74'; Ho Cheng Yau 78' | | ? 17' ? 23' |

Rizal Memorial Stadium, Manila

== Wrestling ==
Baryalai Naseri was the only wrestler representing Afghanistan in 1954 Asiad in the Men's freestyle wrestling (87+ kg category). He gained the silver medal after getting beaten by Japanese wrestler Kenzo Fukuda in the gold medal match.
