= Burma at the 1954 Asian Games =

- IOC code: BIR
- NOC: Burma Olympic Committee

in Manila
- Medals Ranked 8th: Gold 2 Silver 0 Bronze 2 Total 4

Asian Games appearances (overview)
- 1951; 1954; 1958; 1962; 1966; 1970; 1974; 1978; 1982; 1986; 1990; 1994; 1998; 2002; 2006; 2010; 2014; 2018; 2022; 2026

Burma participated in the 1954 Asian Games held in the capital city of Manila, Philippines. This country was ranked 8th with 2 gold medals, and 2 bronze medals with a total of 4 medals to secure its spot in the medal tally.

== Medalists ==
Medal	Name	Sport	Event
Gold	Maung Maung Lwin	Weightlifting	Men's Heavyweight +90kg
Gold	Nil Tun Maung	Weightlifting	Men's Featherweight 60kg
Bronze	Aye Kho	Boxing	Men's Flyweight 51kg
Bronze	Seaton Aukim; Ba Kyu; Perry Dwe; Gordon Samuel; Hla Maung; Htoowa Dwe; Kyaw Zaw; Pe Myint; Maung Aung; Sein Myint; Sein Pe; Douglas Steward; Thein Aung; Tin Kyi; Tun Aung; Robert Yin Gyaw	Football	Men's Football

== Medal summary ==
=== Medal table ===
Sport	Gold	Silver	Bronze	Total
Weightlifting	2	0	0	2
Boxing	0	0	1	1
Football	0	0	1	1
Totals (3 entries)	2	0	2	4
