= Shooting at the 1954 Asian Games =

- Dates: 3–7 May 1954

Shooting sports at the 1954 Asian Games was held in Manila, Philippines between 3 and 7 May 1954. Shooting comprised 6 events, all open to both men and women.

There were two pistol events, three rifle events and trap as a shotgun event in the program.

== Medalists ==
Event	Gold	Silver	Bronze
25 m rapid fire pistol	Martin Gison; Philippines	Tsurukichi Kawaoka; Japan	Lukman Saketi; Indonesia
50 m pistol	Choji Hosaka; Japan	Albert von Einsiedel; Philippines	Simeon Lee; Philippines
50 m rifle prone	Albert von Einsiedel; Philippines	Cesar Jayme; Philippines	Martin Gison; Philippines
50 m rifle 3 positions	Adolfo Feliciano; Philippines	Martin Gison; Philippines	Jose Zalvidea; Philippines
300 m rifle 3 positions	Hernando Castelo; Philippines	Martin Gison; Philippines	Dov Ben-Dov; Israel
Trap	Masao Fujita; Japan	Tokusaburo Iwata; Japan	Enrique Beech; Philippines

== Medal table ==
Rank	Nation	Gold	Silver	Bronze	Total
1	Philippines (PHI)	4	4	4	12
2	Japan (JPN)	2	2	0	4
3	Indonesia (INA)	0	0	1	1
3	Israel (ISR)	0	0	1	1
Totals (4 entries)		6	6	6	18
