= Albert von Einsiedel =

Filipino sports shooter (1917–1999)

Personal information
- Born: 14 May 1917 Manila, Philippines
- Died: 20 August 1999 (aged 82)

Sport
- Sport: Sports shooting
Medal record
Men's shooting
Representing Philippines
Asian Games
Gold medal – first place	1954 Manila	50 m rifle prone
Silver medal – second place	1954 Manila	50 m pistol

Albert von Einsiedel (14 May 1917 – 20 August 1999) was a Filipino sports shooter. He competed in two events at the 1948 Summer Olympics. Von Einsiedel died on 20 August 1999, at the age of 82.
