= Din Mohammad (wrestler) =

Pakistani wrestler (died 2025)

Personal information
- Born: Batapur, Punjab Province, British India
- Died: 3 July 2025

Sport
- Sport: Wrestling
Medal record
Representing Pakistan
Wrestling
Asian Games
Gold medal – first place	1954 Manila	52 kg
British Empire and Commonwealth Games
Bronze medal – third place	1954 Vancouver	52 kg

Din Mohammad (Note: Also known as Baba Deen Mohammad or Din Muhammad.) (died 3 July 2025) was a Pakistani wrestler who became the first Pakistani to win a gold medal at an international competition when he won the flyweight event at the 1954 Asian Games. He was also a bronze medalist at the 1954 British Empire and Commonwealth Games.

== Biography ==
Mohammad grew up in the town of Batapur, near Lahore, Punjab Province, British India (now Pakistan). His family was very poor and he worked at a local Bata factory. He started competing in wrestling at events held during local festivals. He was successful at local events and was noticed by a coach who had him compete against wrestlers in Lahore. After performing well there, he was selected to compete for Pakistan internationally.

Mohammad represented Pakistan at the 1954 Asian Games in Manila, Philippines. Participating in the flyweight category, he defeated opponents from India and Japan, including the well-known flyweight Yushu Kitano, en route to winning the gold medal. His gold medal was the first-ever for Pakistan at an international event, and the Daily Times described it as a "major moment for the country on the international stage". Mohammad later recalled that at the medal ceremony, the organizers did not have either the flag or national anthem of Pakistan, and thus said that they would use the Indian flag and anthem for his gold medal. He refused the idea and later received his medal at the embassy.

Mohammad celebrated his victory with an elephant ride in the streets of Lahore, but was eventually "left ... on the road to come reach his home without having any money in his pocket". He was offered gold medals by the Pakistani authorities for his accomplishments, but instead asked to be given land, an arrangement that was agreed upon but never occurred. Mohammad also competed at the 1954 British Empire and Commonwealth Games in Vancouver and won the bronze medal in his event. He competed at several other international events, winning a tournament in Dhaka.

Mohammad eventually quit wrestling because "no one encouraged or rewarded him for his record". He lived in poverty in his village and told his children not to become wrestlers, saying that he "did not want them to ruin their life" in the sport. He lived in obscurity – residing "in a house made up of mud" – until a media story in 2020 renewed interest in his career. Mohammad was honored by the Punjab government as part of the Sports Board Punjab Wall of Fame and was gifted a cheque of 100,000 Pakistani rupees by sports minister Rai Taimoor Khan. He died from a long illness on 3 July 2025. Punjab sports minister Faisal Ayub Khokhar said that Mohammad's "services to the nation and wrestling are unforgettable. He lifted Pakistan’s flag in international arenas and is a true national hero", while Punjab Director-General of Sports Khizar Afzal Chaudhry said that he "made the nation proud and his contribution to Pakistani sports will always be remembered".
