= Azquiya Usuph =

Sri Lankan snowboarder

Personal information
- Nationality: Sri Lankan
- Born: 24 March 2000 (age 24)
- Education: Colombo British School

Sport
- Country: Sri Lanka
- Sport: Snowboarding

Fathima Azquiya Hafza Usuph (born 24 March 2000) is a Sri Lankan female snowboarder. She competed at the 2017 Asian Winter Games, which was also the first instance where Sri Lanka was eligible to participate in an Asian Winter Games event. Usuph was the only woman to represent Sri Lanka in the Asian Winter Games held in 2017. Azquiya Usuph competed in the Women's giant slalom event.

In 2016, she won the gold medal for snowboarding in the Dream Program Games.
