= Nil Tun Maung =

Burmese weightlifter (1931–2024)

Personal information
- Nationality: Burmese
- Born: 30 September 1931 Mergui, Burma, British India
- Died: 20 July 2024 (aged 92) Yangon, Myanmar

Sport
- Sport: Weightlifting
Medal record
Men's weightlifting
Representing Burma
World Championships
Bronze medal – third place	1954 Vienna	–60 kg
Bronze medal – third place	1955 Munich	–67.5 kg
Asian Games
Gold medal – first place	1954 Manila	–60 kg

Nil Tun Maung (30 September 1931 – 20 July 2024) was a Burmese weightlifter. He competed at the 1952 Summer Olympics, the 1956 Summer Olympics and the 1960 Summer Olympics. Maung died in Yangon on 20 July 2024, at the age of 92.
