= Kim Chang-hee (weightlifter) =

South Korean weightlifter (1921–1990)

- Kim (right) at the 1956 Olympics

Personal information
- Born: 14 February 1921
- Died: 18 January 1990 (aged 68)
- Weight: 67 kg (148 lb)

Sport
- Sport: Olympic weightlifting
Medal record
Representing South Korea
Olympic Games
Bronze medal – third place	1956 Melbourne	Lightweight
Asian Games
Gold medal – first place	1954 Manila	Middleweight

- Kim Chang-hee
- Hangul: 김창희
- Hanja: 金昌熙
- RR: Gim Changhui
- MR: Kim Ch'anghŭi

Kim Chang-hee (Korean: 김창희; 14 February 1921 – 18 January 1990) was a weightlifter from South Korea. He competed at the 1948, 1952 and 1956 Summer Olympics in the lightweight category and finished in sixth, fourth and third place, respectively. He won this event at the 1954 Asian Games.
