= Sri Lanka at the 2017 Asian Winter Games =

- IOC code: SRI
- NOC: National Olympic Committee of Sri Lanka

in Sapporo and Obihiro February 19–26
- Competitors: 5 in 3 sports
- Flag bearer: Lukas Hettiarachchi
- Medals: Gold 0 Silver 0 Bronze 0 Total 0

Asian Winter Games appearances
- 2017; 2025; 2029

Sri Lanka took part in the 2017 Asian Winter Games in Sapporo and Obihiro, Japan from February 19 to 26. This marks the country's official debut at the Asian Winter Games and a global Winter sporting event. The country is scheduled to compete with five athletes in one sport (three disciplines). The team will also consist of two officials and a chef de mission. The chef de mission of the team is Gihan Dalpathdo, the secretary general of Winter Sport Association of Sri Lanka.

== Competitors ==
The following table lists the Sri Lankan delegation per sport and gender.

Sport	Men	Women	Total
Alpine skiing	1	0	1
Cross-country skiing	3	0	3
Snowboarding	0	1	1
Total	4	1	5

== Alpine skiing ==
Sri Lanka is scheduled to enter one male alpine skier.

Men

- Seshaan Gardiner

== Cross-country skiing ==
Sri Lanka is scheduled to enter one male cross-country skier. Sajeev de Silva is a former rower who competed for the country at the 2010 Asian Games in Guangzhou, China, he later switched to archery and was part of the silver medal-winning team at the 2016 South Asian Games in Guwahati, India. On the other hand, Lukas Hettiarachchi won a gold medal in the beginners category during the dream program run by the organizing committee of the 2018 Winter Olympics.

Man

- Lukas Hettiarachchi
- Sajeev de Silva
- Shehan Muthugala

== Snowboarding ==
Sri Lanka entered one female snowboarder. Azquiya Usuph is a two time gold medalist as part of the dream program. Usuph competed in the giant slalom event and was disqualified after missing a gate.

Woman

Athlete	Event	Run 1		Run 2		Total	
Athlete	Event	Time	Rank	Time	Rank	Time	Rank
Azquiya Usuph	Giant slalom	DQ					
