= Chay Weng Yew =

Singaporean weightlifter (1926–2004)

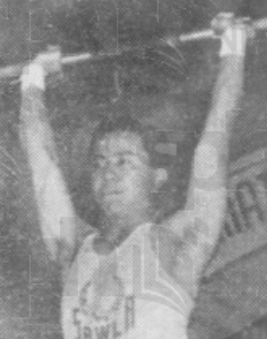
- Chay in 1953

Personal information
- Nationality: Singaporean
- Born: 22 February 1928
- Died: 27 August 2004 (aged 76)

Sport
- Sport: Weightlifting

Chay Weng Yew (22 February 1926 – 27 August 2004) was a Singaporean weightlifter. He won the featherweight championship of Singapore in 1948, 1949 and 1950. He participated in the Singapore at the 1951 Asian Games in New Delhi. He competed in the men's featherweight event at the 1952 Summer Olympics, placing sixth. He represented Singapore at the 1954 Asian Games, held in Manila. He won a bronze medal in the Men's Featherweight 60 kg competition. In October of the following year, Chay, then a bank clerk, announced that he would be retiring from weightlifting.

Chay died of stomach cancer on 27 August 2004.
