= Sri Lanka at the 2025 Asian Winter Games =

- Flag of Sri Lanka
- IOC code: SRI
- NOC: National Olympic Committee of Sri Lanka

in Harbin, China 7 February 2025 – 14 February 2025
- Competitors: 4 in 1 sport
- Flag bearers: Sajeev De Silva & Piumi Piyadarshani
- Medals: Gold 0 Silver 0 Bronze 0 Total 0

Asian Winter Games appearances
- 2017; 2025; 2029

Sri Lanka competed at the 2025 Asian Winter Games in Harbin, China, from February 7 to 14. The Sri Lankan team consisted of four athletes, three men and one woman competing in cross-county skiing. Cross-country skiers Sajeev De Silva and Piumi Piyadarshani were the country's opening ceremony flagbearers.

== Competitors ==
The following table lists the Sri Lankan delegation per sport and gender.

Sport	Men	Women	Total
Cross-country skiing	3	1	4
Total	3	1	4

== Cross-country skiing ==
Sri Lanka entered four cross-country skiers (three men and one woman). Both De Silva and Muthugala returned to compete after competing for the country in 2017. All four Sri Lankan athletes finished in last place in their events, with the men occupying the last three finishing positions in their event.

Distance

Athlete	Event	Final		
Athlete	Event	Time	Deficit	Rank
Sajeev De Silva	Men's 10 km freestyle	1:12:03.4	+50:56.9	46
Dhanushka Gedara	Men's 10 km freestyle	51:15.7	+30:09.2	44
Shehan Muthugala	Men's 10 km freestyle	1:09:44.6	+48:38.1	45
Piumi Piyadarshani	Women's 5 km freestyle	34:00.8	+21:53.3	33

== See also ==
- Sri Lanka at the 2024 Summer Olympics
