= Philippines at the 1954 Asian Games =

- IOC code: PHI
- NOC: Philippine Olympic Committee
- Website: www.olympic.ph (in English)

in Manila
- Medals Ranked 2nd: Gold 14 Silver 14 Bronze 17 Total 45

Asian Games appearances (overview)
- 1951; 1954; 1958; 1962; 1966; 1970; 1974; 1978; 1982; 1986; 1990; 1994; 1998; 2002; 2006; 2010; 2014; 2018; 2022; 2026

The Philippines participated and hosted the 1954 Asian Games held in the capital city of Manila. The country ranked 2nd with 14 gold medals, 14 silver medals and 17 bronze medals with a total of 45 medals to secure its second spot in the medal tally.

== Asian Games performance ==
Boxing produced five gold medals, while swimming and shooting added four golds each. The basketball squad also won the gold medal.

Martin Gison bagged one gold medal in rapid fire pistol, two silvers in small bore rifle and free rifle, and one bronze medal in small bore rifle.

The gold medalists in boxing included Ernesto Sajo (flyweight), Alejandro Ortuoste (bantamweight), Celedonio Espinosa (lightweight), Ernesto Porto (light welterweight), and Vicente Tunacao (middleweight). Two female swimmers - Haydee Coloso and Jocelyn von Giese - made a sensational debut with golden performances in their respective events.

== Medalists ==
=== Gold ===
No.	Medal	Name	Sport	Event	Date
1	Gold	Bayani Amador; Florentino Bautista; Jose Ma. Cacho; Napoleon Flores; Antonio Genato; Rafael Hechanova; Eduardo Lim; Carlos Loyzaga; Ramon Manulat; Lauro Mumar; Francisco Rabat; Ignacio Ramos; Ponciano Saldaña; Mariano Tolentino	Basketball	Men's Team	8 May
2	Gold	Ernesto Sajo	Boxing	Men's Flyweight 51kg	8 May
3	Gold	Alejandro Ortuoste	Boxing	Men's Bantamweight 54kg	8 May
4	Gold	Celedonio Espinosa	Boxing	Men's Lightweight 60kg	8 May
5	Gold	Ernesto Porto	Boxing	Men's Light Welterweight 63.5kg	8 May
6	Gold	Vicente Tuñacao	Boxing	Men's Light Middleweight 71kg	8 May
7	Gold	Martin Gison	Shooting	25m Rapid Fire Pistol	-
8	Gold	Albert von Einsiedel	Shooting	50m Rifle Prone	-
9	Gold	Adolfo Feliciano	Shooting	50m Rifle 3 Positions	-
10	Gold	Hernando Castelo	Shooting	300m Rifle 3 Positions	-
11	Gold	Parsons Nabiula	Swimming	Men's 200m Butterfly	May 1954
12	Gold	Haydee Coloso	Swimming	Women's 100 m Freestyle	May 1954
13	Gold	Jocelyn von Giese	Swimming	Women's 100m Backstroke	May 1954
14	Gold	Haydee Coloso	Swimming	Women's 100m Butterfly	May 1954

=== Silver ===
No.	Medal	Name	Sport	Event	Date
1	Silver	Genaro Cabrera	Athletics	Men's 100m	-
2	Silver	Mauro Dizon	Boxing	Men's Featherweight 57kg	8 May
3	Silver	Albert von Einsiedel	Shooting	50m Pistol	-
4	Silver	Cesar Jayme	Shooting	50m Rifle Prone	-
5	Silver	Martin Gison	Shooting	50m Rifle 3 Positions	-
6	Silver	Martin Gison	Shooting	300m Rifle 3 Positions	-
7	Silver	Amado Jimenez	Swimming	Men's 200m Butterfly	May 1954
8	Silver	Norma Yldefonso	Swimming	Women's 100m Butterfly	May 1954
9	Silver	Sonia von Giese; Gertrudes Vito; Nimfa Lim; Haydee Coloso	Swimming	Women's 4 × 100 m Freestyle Relay	May 1954
10	Silver	Rodolfo Caparas	Weightlifting	Bantamweight 56kg	-
11	Silver	Rodrigo del Rosario	Weightlifting	Featherweight 60kg	-
12	Silver	Pedro del Mundo	Weightlifting	Middle Heavyweight 90kg	-
13	Silver	Mansueto Napilay	Wrestling	Featherweight 62kg	3 May
14	Silver	Nicolas Arcales	Wrestling	Middleweight 79kg	3 May

=== Bronze ===
No.	Medal	Name	Sport	Event	Date
1	Bronze	Jaime Pimental	Athletics	Men's 400m Hurdles	-
2	Bronze	Genaro Cabrera; Gaspar Azares; Eusebio Ensong; Pedro Subido	Athletics	Men's 4 × 100 m Relay	-
3	Bronze	Pablo Somblingo; Cipriano Niera; Mauricio Paubaya; Ernesto Rodriguez	Athletics	Men's 4 × 400 m Relay	-
4	Bronze	Andres Franco	Athletics	Men's High Jump	-
5	Bronze	Inocencia Solis	Athletics	Women's 200m	-
6	Bronze	Inocencia Solis; Rogelia Ferrer; Manolita Cinco; Roberta Anore	Athletics	Women's 4 × 100 m Relay	-
7	Bronze	Vivencia Subido	Athletics	Women's Javelin Throw	-
8	Bronze	Simeon Lee	Shooting	50m Pistol	-
9	Bronze	Martin Gison	Shooting	50m Rifle Prone	-
10	Bronze	Jose Zalvidea	Shooting	50m Rifle 3 Positions	-
11	Bronze	Enrique Beech	Shooting	Trap	-
12	Bronze	Bana Sailani	Swimming	Men's 400m Freestyle	May 1954
13	Bronze	Robert Collins	Swimming	Men's 200m Butterfly	May 1954
14	Bronze	Rolando Santos; Bertulfo Cachero; Angel Colmenares; Bana Sailani	Swimming	Men's 4 × 200 m Freestyle Relay	May 1954
15	Bronze	Sandra von Giese	Swimming	Women's 100m Butterfly	May 1954
16	Bronze	Joaquin Vasquez	Weightlifting	Middle Heavyweight 90kg	-
17	Bronze	Basilio Fabila	Wrestling	Flyweight 52kg	3 May

=== Multiple ===
Name	Sport	Gold	Silver	Bronze	Total
Haydee Coloso	Swimming	2	1	0	3
Martin Gison	Shooting	1	2	1	4
Albert von Einsiedel	Shooting	1	1	0	2
Genaro Cabrera	Athletics	0	1	1	2
Bana Sailani	Swimming	0	0	2	2
Inocencia Solis	Athletics	0	0	2	2

== Medal summary ==
=== Medal by sports ===
Sport	Gold	Silver	Bronze	Total
Boxing	5	1	0	6
Shooting	4	4	4	12
Swimming	4	3	4	11
Basketball	1	0	0	1
Weightlifting	0	3	1	4
Wrestling	0	2	1	3
Athletics	0	1	7	8
Totals (7 entries)	14	14	17	45
