= Martin Gison =

Filipino sports shooter

Personal information
- Nationality: Filipino
- Born: Martin Mauricio Gison; March 14, 1914

Sport
- Country: Philippines
- Sport: Sports shooting
Medal record
Men's shooting
Representing Philippines
Asian Games
Gold medal – first place	1954 Manila	25 m rapid fire pistol
Silver medal – second place	1954 Manila	50 m rifle 3 positions
Silver medal – second place	1954 Manila	300 m rifle 3 positions
Silver medal – second place	1958 Tokyo	25 m rapid fire pistol
Bronze medal – third place	1954 Manila	50 m rifle prone

Martin Mauricio Gison (born March 14, 1914, date of death unknown) was a Filipino sports shooter. He is competed at five Olympic Games, the most for any Filipino as of 2008.

Gison's first Olympics was in 1936 at 22 years old. He also competed at the 1948, 1952, 1956 and 1964 editions of the Olympics. The best finished accomplished by Gison was in 1936 where he placed fourth in the men's 50m small-bore rifle event.

During World War II, Gison was taken as a prisoner of war by the Japanese and survived the Bataan Death March.
