= Ernesto Porto =

Filipino boxer (1928–1973)

Personal information
- Nationality: Filipino
- Born: August 16, 1928 Quezon City, Philippine Islands
- Died: February 5, 1973 (aged 44) Quezon City, Philippines

Sport
- Sport: Boxing
- Weight class: Lightweight, light welterweight
Medal record
Men's boxing
Representing Philippines
Asian Games
Gold medal – first place	1954 Manila	-63.5 kg

Ernesto de la Cruz Porto (August 16, 1928 – February 5, 1973) was a Filipino amateur boxer. He competed at the 1948 Summer Olympics and the 1952 Summer Olympics. At the 1948 Summer Olympics, he lost in his first fight to Gerald Dreyer of South Africa, the eventual gold medalist. He also won the gold medal in the lightweight division of the 1954 Asian Games.
