= Ceylon at the 1954 Asian Games =

- IOC code: CEY
- NOC: National Olympic Committee of Ceylon

in Manila
- Medals Ranked 10th: Gold 0 Silver 1 Bronze 1 Total 2

Asian Games appearances
- 1951; 1954; 1958; 1962; 1966; 1970; 1974; 1978; 1982; 1986; 1990; 1994; 1998; 2002; 2006; 2010; 2014; 2018; 2022; 2026

Ceylon participated in the 1954 Asian Games held in the capital city of Manila, Philippines. This country was ranked 10th with a silver medal and a bronze medal with a total of 2 medals to secure its spot in the medal tally.

== Medalists ==
Medal	Name	Sport	Event
Silver	Hempala Jayasuriya	Boxing	Men's Bantamweight 54kg
Bronze	Chandrasena Jayasuriya	Boxing	Men's Featherweight 57kg

== Medal summary ==
=== Medal table ===
Sport	Gold	Silver	Bronze	Total
Boxing	0	1	1	2
Totals (1 entries)	0	1	1	2
