= Celedonio Espinosa =

Filipino boxer (1933–2016)

Celedonio Kunanan Espinosa Jr. (July 5, 1933 in Looc, Romblon – November 16, 2016) was a Filipino Olympic boxer who competed in the 1954 Asian Games in Manila and took home the gold medal. He represented the Philippines in the 1956 Summer Olympics in Melbourne, Australia and bagged the bronze medal in the 1958 Asian Games staged in Tokyo, Japan. He once assumed the post of the Far Eastern University Boxing Team and also became a boxing coach, referee and judge. Espinosa was born in Looc, Romblon on July 5, 1933, and died on November 16, 2016, at the age of 83.
