= 1954 Asian Games medal table =

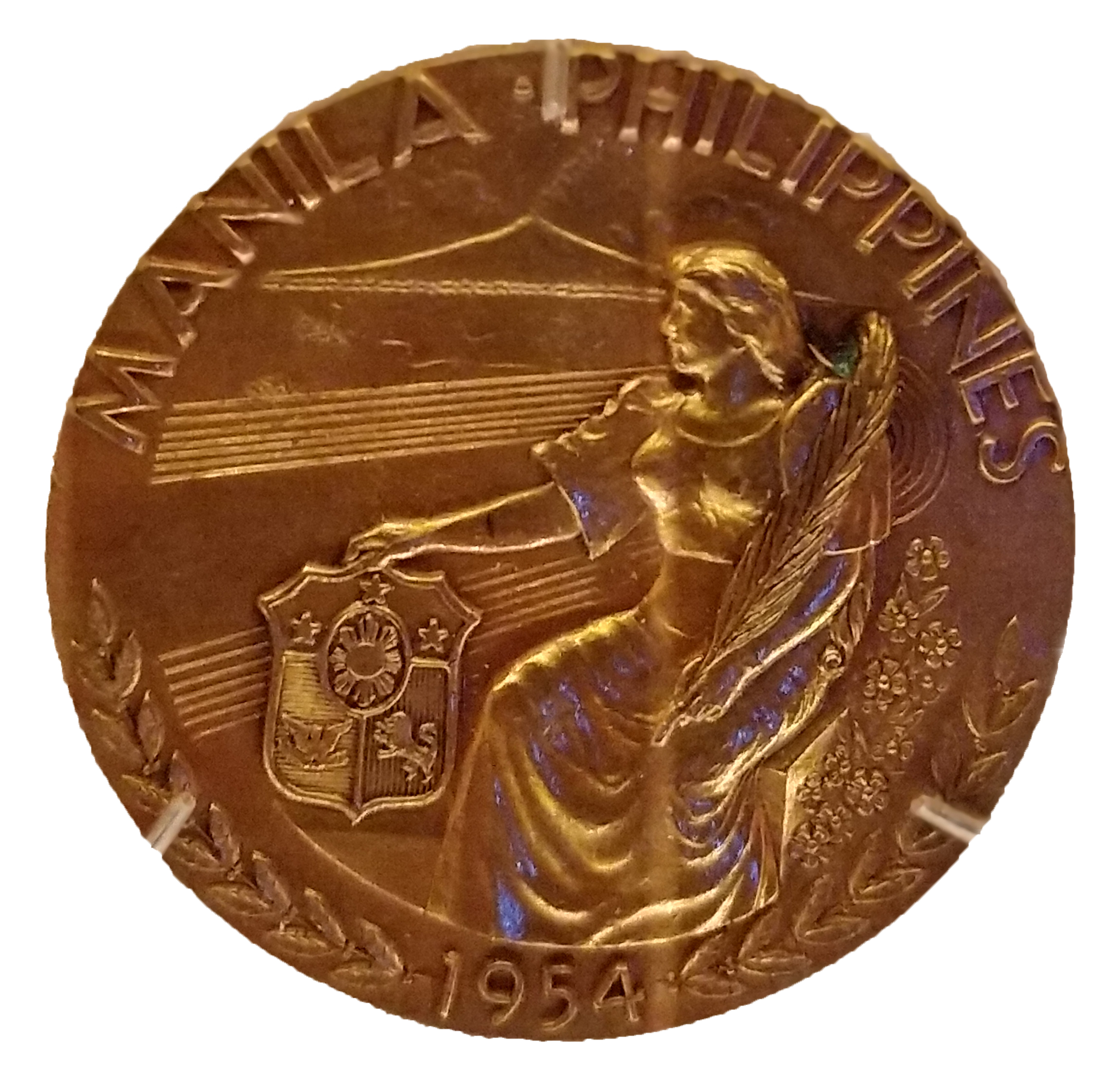
- 1954 Asian Games Gold Medal
- Location: Manila, Philippines

Highlights
- Most gold medals: Japan 38
- Most total medals: Japan 24
- Medalling NOCs: 13

The 1954 Asian Games (officially known as Second Asian Games – Manila 1954) was a multi-sport event celebrated in Manila, Philippines from May 1 to May 9, 1954. This was the second edition of the Asian Games, in which a total 970 athletes representing 18 Asian National Olympic Committees participated in eight sports divided into 76 events.

== Medal table ==
The ranking in this table is consistent within International Olympic Committee convention in its published medal tables. By default, the table is ordered by the number of gold medals the athletes from a nation have won

* Host nation (Philippines)

Rank	Nation	Gold	Silver	Bronze	Total
1	Japan (JPN)	38	36	24	98
2	Philippines (PHI)*	14	14	17	45
3	South Korea (KOR)	8	6	5	19
4	Pakistan (PAK)	5	6	2	13
5	India (IND)	5	4	8	17
6	Republic of China (ROC)	2	4	7	13
7	Israel (ISR)	2	1	1	4
8	Burma (BIR)	2	0	2	4
9	Singapore (SIN)	1	4	4	9
10	Ceylon (CEY)	0	1	1	2
11	Afghanistan (AFG)	0	1	0	1
12	Indonesia (INA)	0	0	3	3
13	Hong Kong (HKG)	0	0	1	1
Totals (13 entries)		77	77	75	229
