= Alejandro Ortuoste =

Filipino boxer

Personal information
- Born: March 17, 1931 Manila, Philippine Commonwealth

Boxing career
- Weight class: Bantamweight
Medal record
Men's Boxing
Representing the Philippines
Asian Games
| Gold medal – first place | 1954 Manila | Bantamweight |

Alejandro Jose Ortuoste (born March 17, 1931, date of death unknown) was a Filipino amateur boxer. He won the gold medal at the 1954 Asian Games in the men's bantamweight (– 54 kg) division. He represented the Philippines at the 1952 Summer Olympics in Helsinki, Finland, failing to reach the third round.

== 1952 Olympic results ==
- Round of 32: bye
- Round of 16: lost to John McNally (Ireland) on points, 0-3
