= Singapore at the 1954 Asian Games =

- IOC code: SIN
- NOC: Singapore National Olympic Council

in Manila
- Medals Ranked 9th: Gold 1 Silver 4 Bronze 4 Total 9

Asian Games appearances (overview)
- 1951; 1954; 1958; 1962; 1966; 1970; 1974; 1978; 1982; 1986; 1990; 1994; 1998; 2002; 2006; 2010; 2014; 2018; 2022; 2026

Singapore participated in the 1954 Asian Games held in the capital city of Manila, Philippines. This country was ranked 9th with a gold medal, 4 silver medals and 4 bronze medals with a total of 9 medals.

== Medal summary ==
=== Medal table ===
Sport	Gold	Silver	Bronze	Total
Water polo	1	0	0	1
Athletics	0	2	1	3
Swimming	0	1	1	2
Boxing	0	1	0	1
Weightlifting	0	0	2	2
Totals (5 entries)	1	4	4	9

=== Medalists ===
Medal	Name	Sport	Event
Gold	Gan Eng Teck; Ho Kian Bin; Kee Soon Bee; Keith Mitchell; Oh Chwee Hock; Tan Eng Bock; Tan Hwee Hock; Wiebe Wolters	Water polo	Men's Team
Silver	Chan Onn Leng	Athletics	Men's 400 m hurdles
Silver	Mary Klass	Athletics	Women's 100 m
Silver	Bulat Bin Ismail	Athletics	Men's Welterweight 67kg
Silver	Ong Choon Lim; Tan Teow Choon; Lionel Chee; Neo Chwee Kok	Swimming	Men's 4 × 200 m freestyle relay
Bronze	Tang Pui Wah	Athletics	Women's 80 m hurdles
Bronze	Neo Chwee Kok	Swimming	Men's 100 m freestyle
Bronze	Chay Weng Yew	Weightlifting	Men's Featherweight 60 kg
Bronze	Harold de Castro	Weightlifting	Men's Light heavyweight 82.5 kg
