= Vicente Tuñacao =

Filipino boxer

Personal information
- Nationality: Filipino
- Born: April 3, 1925

Sport
- Sport: Boxing
- Weight class: Welterweight, light middleweight

Vicente Tuñacao (born April 3, 1925) was a Filipino boxer. He competed in the men's welterweight event at the 1952 Summer Olympics.
