= Hempala Jayasuriya =

Sri Lankan boxer (born 1930)

Personal information
- Full name: Hempala Premachandra Jayasuriya
- Nationality: Sri Lankan
- Born: 1930
- Died: unknown

Sport
- Sport: Boxing

Hempala Premachandra "Henry" Jayasuriya (born 1930, date of death unknown) was a Sri Lankan boxer. He competed in the men's bantamweight event at the 1956 Summer Olympics. At the 1956 Summer Olympics, he lost to Robert Bath of Australia. Jayasuriya is deceased.
