= Chandrasena Jayasuriya =

Sri Lankan boxer

Personal information
- Full name: Chandrasena Perera Jayasuriya
- Nationality: Sri Lankan
- Born: 27 January 1935
- Died: 21 February 2000 (aged 65)

Sport
- Sport: Boxing

Chandrasena Perera Jayasuriya (27 January 1935 – 21 February 2000) was a Sri Lankan boxer. He competed in the men's lightweight event at the 1956 Summer Olympics.
