= Republic of China at the 1954 Asian Games =

- IOC code: ROC
- NOC: Republic of China Olympic Committee

in Manila
- Medals Ranked 6th: Gold 2 Silver 4 Bronze 7 Total 13

Asian Games appearances (overview)
- 1954; 1958; 1962; 1966; 1970; 1974–1986; 1990; 1994; 1998; 2002; 2006; 2010; 2014; 2018; 2022; 2026

The Republic Of China participated in the 1954 Asian Games held in the capital city of Manila, Philippines. This country was ranked 6th with 2 gold medals, 4 silver medals and 7 bronze medals with a total of 4 medals to secure its spot in the medal tally.

== Medalists ==
Medal	Name	Sport	Event
Gold	Yang Chuan-kwang	Athletics	Men's Decathlon
Gold	Chan Fai-hung; Chou Wen-chi; Chu Chin-ching; Chu Wing-keung; Hau Ching-to; Hau Yung-sang; Ho Ying-fan; Hsu Wei-po; King Loh-sung; Lau Yee; Lee Tai-fai; Li Chun-fat; Lo Ching-hsiang; Mok Chun-wah; Ng Kee-cheung; Pau King-yin; Szeto Man; Tang Sum; Teng Sheung; Tse Tsu-kuo; Yen Shih-hsin; Yiu Cheuk-yin	Football	Men's Team
Silver	Chi Pei-lin	Athletics	Men's Discus throw
Silver	Hoo Cha-pen; Lai Lam-kwong; Edward Lee; Jose Lim; Julian Lim; Ling Jing-huan; Joachim Poon; Tong Suet-fong; Tsai Bon-hua; Wang Yih-jiun; Wu Yet-an; Joachim Yao; James Yap; Yung Pi-hock	Basketball	Men's Team
Silver	Henry Wong	Boxing	Men's Lightweight 60kg
Silver	Hong Chi-hua	Weightlifting	Men's Heavyweight +90kg
Bronze	Chen Ying-lang	Athletics	Men's 400m
Bronze	Pi Li-ming	Athletics	Men's 10,000m
Bronze	Lai Yu-tao	Athletics	Men's Pole vault
Bronze	Lin Te-sheng	Athletics	Men's Long jump
Bronze	Liu Ching	Athletics	Men's Discus throw
Bronze	Kwok Ngan-hung; Tsui Shiu-ling; Chang Zoe-chee; Chan Sin-yi	Swimming	Women's 4 × 100 m freestyle relay
Bronze	Shih Ping-hua	Weightlifting	Men's Heavyweight +90kg

== Medal summary ==
=== Medal table ===
Sport	Gold	Silver	Bronze	Total
Athletics	1	1	5	7
Football	1	0	0	1
Weightlifting	0	1	1	2
Basketball	0	1	0	1
Boxing	0	1	0	1
Swimming	0	0	1	1
Totals (6 entries)	2	4	7	13
