= South Korea at the 1954 Asian Games =

- IOC code: KOR
- NOC: Korean Olympic Committee

in Manila
- Competitors: 57 in 6 sports
- Officials: 24
- Medals Ranked 3rd: Gold 8 Silver 6 Bronze 5 Total 19

Asian Games appearances (overview)
- 1954; 1958; 1962; 1966; 1970; 1974; 1978; 1982; 1986; 1990; 1994; 1998; 2002; 2006; 2010; 2014; 2018; 2022; 2026

South Korea participated in the 1954 Asian Games held in the city of Manila, Philippines. The games were held from May 1, 1954, to May 9, 1954. South Korea was ranked third with eight gold medals in this edition of the Asiad.

== Medal summary ==
=== Medal table ===
Sport	Gold	Silver	Bronze	Total
Weightlifting	5	1	0	6
Athletics	2	1	2	5
Boxing	1	2	1	4
Wrestling	0	1	2	3
Football	0	1	0	1
Totals (5 entries)	8	6	5	19

=== Medalists ===
Medal	Name	Sport	Event
Gold	Choi Yun-Chil	Athletics	Men's 1500 m
Gold	Choi Chung-Sik	Athletics	Men's 10000 m
Gold	Park Kyu-Hyun	Boxing	Men's Featherweight (-57 kg)
Gold	Yu In-Ho	Weightlifting	Men's -56 kg
Gold	Cho Bong-Mok	Weightlifting	Men's -67.5 kg
Gold	Kim Chang-Hee	Weightlifting	Men's -75 kg
Gold	Kim Seong-Jip	Weightlifting	Men's -87.5 kg
Gold	Ko, Chong-Ku	Weightlifting	Men's -90 kg
Silver	Choi Yun-Chil	Athletics	Men's 5000 m
Silver	Lee Jang-Kyo	Boxing	Men's Flyweight (-51 kg)
Silver	Lee Sam-Yong	Boxing	Men's Lightwelterweight (-63.5 kg)
Silver	Team Korea	Football	Men's Team competition
Silver	Han Deok-Heung	Wrestling	Men's Freestyle -57 kg
Silver	Na Si-Yoon	Weightlifting	Men's -75 kg
Bronze	Choi Young-Ki	Athletics	Men's Triple jump
Bronze	Song Kyo-Sik	Athletics	Men's Hammer throw]
Bronze	Kim Yoon-Seo	Boxing	Men's Welterweight (-67 kg)
Bronze	Kim Young-Jun	Wrestling	Men's Freestyle -62 kg
Bronze	Lim Bae-Young	Wrestling	Men's Freestyle -73 kg
