= Rizal Memorial Sports Complex =

Sports complex in Manila, Philippines

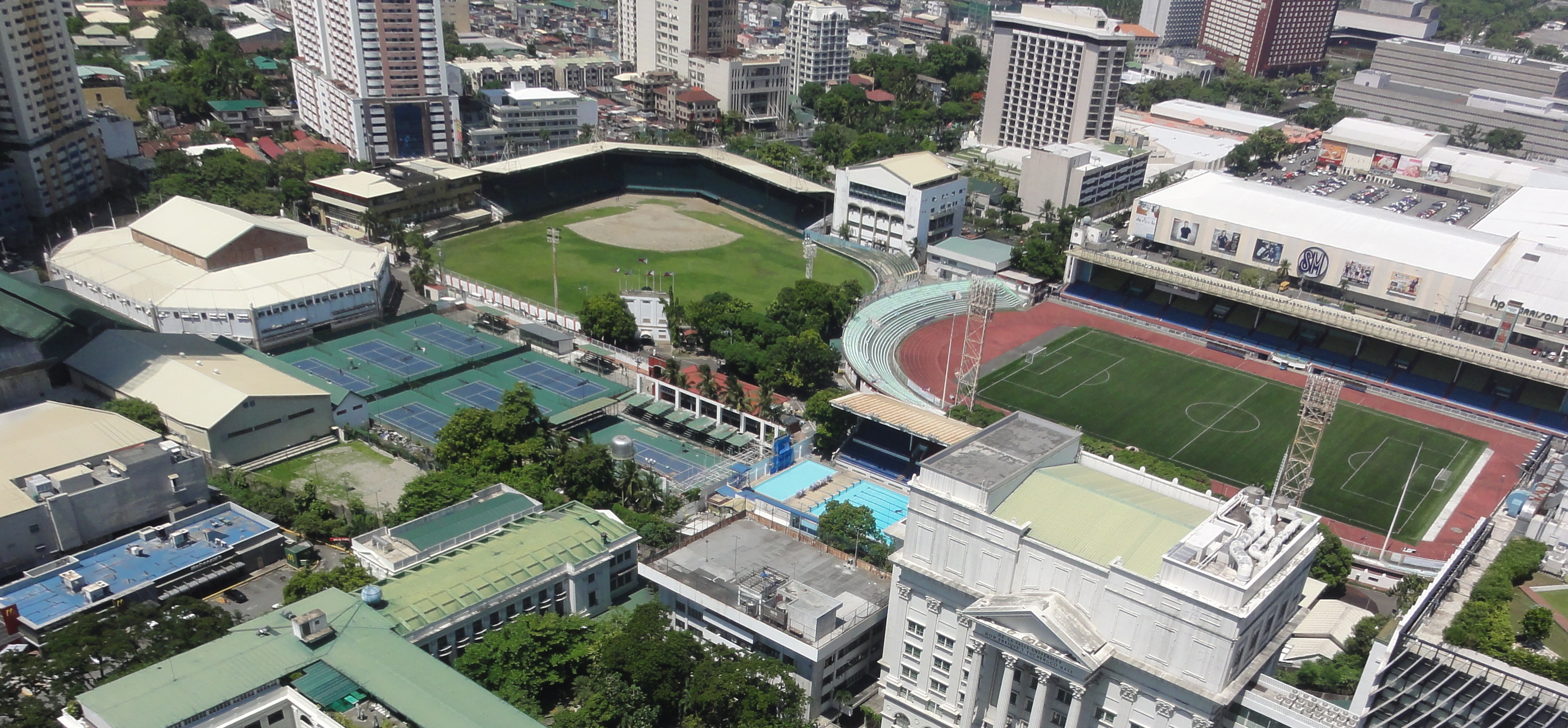
- The sports complex with the De La Salle University campus in the foreground
- Interactive map of Rizal Memorial Sports Complex
- Former names: Rizal Memorial Field
- Location: Manila, Philippines
- Coordinates: 14.563810°N 120.990623°E
- Owner: City Government of Manila
- Operator: Philippine Sports Commission
- Main venue: Rizal Memorial Track and Football Stadium; Capacity: 12,873
- Facilities: Rizal Memorial Baseball Stadium; Rizal Memorial Coliseum; Ninoy Aquino Stadium; And others (see below)
- Public transit: Vito Cruz; 5 6 7 14 17 23 24 25 27 34 38 40 42 48 49 52 53 P. Ocampo

Construction
- Built: 1927
- Opened: 1934
- Renovated: 2019

Tenant
- Philippine Sports Commission

National Historical Landmarks
- Official name: Rizal Memorial Sports Complex
- Type: Sports complex
- Designated: March 27, 2017; 9 years ago
- Reference no.: No. 5, s. 2017

The Rizal Memorial Sports Complex (RMSC; formerly known as Rizal Memorial Field) is a national sports complex of the Philippines, located on Pablo Ocampo St. (formerly Vito Cruz St.), Malate, Manila. It is named in honor of the country's national hero, José Rizal (1861–1896). The complex is currently managed by the Philippine Sports Commission, while the property is owned by the Manila City government. The complex also houses the administrative office of the PSC, and quarters for the Philippines' national athletes.

== History ==
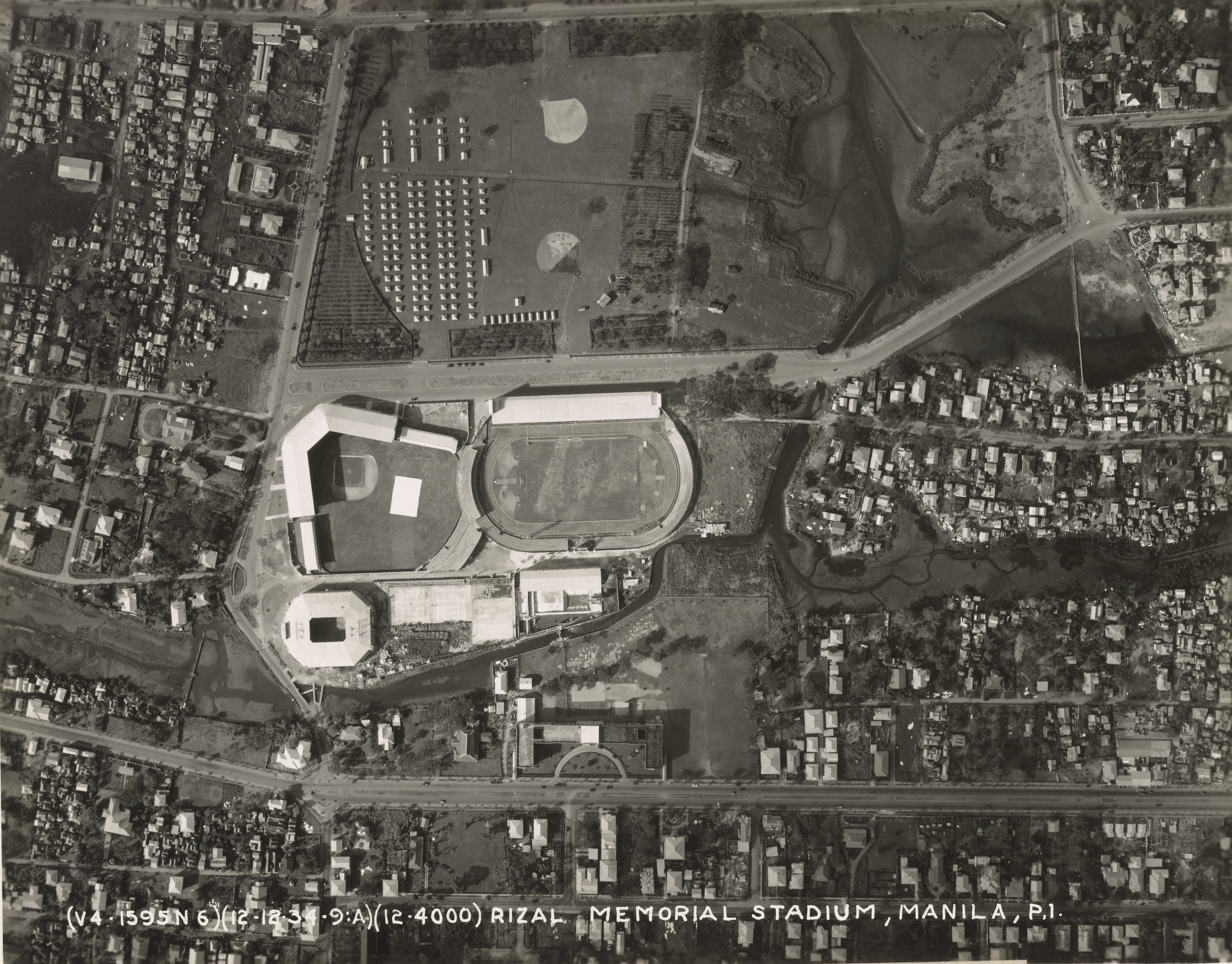
Aerial view of Rizal Memorial Field in 1931

Standing on the site of the former Manila Carnival Grounds, the Rizal Memorial Sports Complex (then known as Rizal Memorial Field) was constructed in 1927 and was inaugurated in time for the 1934 Far Eastern Championship Games. The land was donated by the Vito Cruz family and the initial sports facilities - the track and football stadium, the baseball stadium, the tennis stadium (later renovated into an indoor arena) and the swimming stadium - were designed by architect Juan Arellano in the Art Deco style. It was planned and built by then-Public Works secretary, Antonio de las Alas. Construction for a multi-purpose arena was begun in the 1960s.

During the Philippine Commonwealth era, the sports complex was used as a civic area and was the site where Manuel L. Quezon was named one of the presidential candidates in the 1935 elections. It was destroyed during the Battle of Manila of World War II, and reconstructed in 1953 (although the baseball stadium reopened in January 1946 after the floodlights was repaired.) for use in the 1954 Asian Games.

Baseball legends Lou Gehrig and Babe Ruth once hit their first and second home runs ever, respectively, in the exhibition game held at the newly built Rizal Memorial Baseball Stadium on December 2, 1934.

The Beatles held their infamous, two sold-out concerts in the Philippines on July 4, 1966, at the Rizal Memorial Stadium. The combined attendance was 80,000, with the evening concert registering 50,000 paying audience and became the Beatles' second largest concert ever.

=== Proposed sale ===
On November 22, 2016, then-Manila Mayor Joseph Estrada announced that the city government was making a partnership with businessman Enrique Razon to convert the Rizal Memorial Sports Complex into a commercial center which will include a mall and cinemas. The group of Razon had expressed interest for the proposed urban redevelopment and modernization of the RMSC. The plan was to build contemporary buildings, commercial structures alongside open spaces within the property. Also included in the proposal was a sports museum and the retention of the Rizal Memorial Coliseum's facade. The PSC reportedly planned to transfer the facilities in the proposed Philippine Sports City (later renamed New Clark City Sports Hub) in New Clark City. The move was criticized by various heritage groups and athletes, and an online petition on Change.org was initiated to save the complex amid several reports on the planned redevelopment. Estrada defended the redevelopment of the RMSC, stating that no one uses the complex anymore and it became old, and antiquated.

In April 2017, the sports complex was declared a National Historical Landmark by the National Historical Commission of the Philippines and an Important Cultural Property by the National Museum of the Philippines, ensuring the site's preservation due to the National Cultural Heritage Act.

Because of the declaration, the Razon group later dropped its bid to redevelop the complex and the Philippine Sports Commission halted its negotiations with the Manila city government on the planned sale of RMSC. On August 7, 2019, both the PSC and the city government agreed not to sell the complex.

=== Renovations ===
On June 27, 2019, PSC announced that the complex will be renovated for the 2019 Southeast Asian Games, to be funded through a ₱842.5 million donation of PAGCOR to the PSC in April 2019. Renovation work began on July 8, 2019. Unlike previous renovations, major renovation works were done for the first time since the rebuilding of the complex in 1953, with the coliseum restored to its original look and the addition of new installments to fit with international standards. The renovation of the facilities inside the complex are intended for both future local and international tournaments from various sports. Proceeds from rentals would be used by the PSC to address the needs of the Filipino athletes.

The complex was converted to a quarantine facility during the coronavirus pandemic. It housed patients from the Philippine General Hospital who have mild symptoms.

In late 2025 and early 2026, renovations were done on the tennis center, baseball stadium and aquatics center. A new media center was installed at the administration office. On November 15, 2026, the PSC announced a donation from FIFA that will fund the stadium's renovation and expansion, which will be done alongside improvements to the complex's pedestrian access and new open spaces.

== Notable events ==
- Far Eastern Championship Games (1913, 1919, 1925, 1934)
- 1954 Asian Games
- Southeast Asian Games (1981, 1991, 2005, 2019)
- 2005 ASEAN Para Games
- 2006 Asian Women's Club Volleyball Championship
- 2024 AVC Women's Challenge Cup
- 2026 Philippine Women's Open

== Facilities ==
=== Sports venues ===
Venue	Purpose	Seating capacity	Year built	Notes
Gymnastics Hall	Gymnastics venue	–	–	
Hidilyn Diaz Weightlifting Gym	Weightlifting venue	–	–	
Ninoy Aquino Stadium (PSC Multipurpose Gym)	Multi-use	6,000	–	Formerly an open-air stadium which was converted to an indoor arena.
Philippine Taekwondo Association Dojang	Taekwondo venue	–	–	
PSC Badminton Hall	Badminton venue	–	–	
PSC Bowling Center	Bowling venue	–	–	In January 2026, a taekwondo venue was planned.
Teofilo Yldefonso Swimming Pool	Aquatic sports venue	–	1934	
Rizal Memorial Coliseum	Multi-use	6,100	1934	Formerly the Rizal Memorial Tennis Stadium which was converted to an indoor arena.
Rizal Memorial Baseball Stadium	Baseball venue	10,000	1934	Former ballpark of the Muntinlupa Mariners
Rizal Memorial Stadium	Multi-use, primarily football	12,873	1934	
Rizal Memorial Tennis Center	Tennis venue	1,578	1987	Has seven tennis courts
National Squash Center	Squash venue	–	2024	Situated between the Rizal Memorial Track and Football Stadium and the Ninoy Aquino Stadium. Set to hosts the only jumbo doubles squash courts in the Philippines. Construction delayed due to the COVID-19 pandemic.

=== Other ===
Facility	Purpose	Year built	Notes
PSC Administration Building	Office		
Philippine Center for Sports Medicine	Office		
Philippine Taekwondo Association Main Office	Office		
National Athletes and Coaches Lounge			
Athlete's Dormitory	Residence	Under-construction	

=== Former ===
Venue	Purpose	Year built	Notes
PSC-ABAP Boxing Gym	Boxing venue	–	Demolished by 2024 for the Athletes' Dormitory
Pencak Silat Gym	Pencak silat	–	Demolished by 2024 for the Athletes' Dormitory

=== Gallery ===
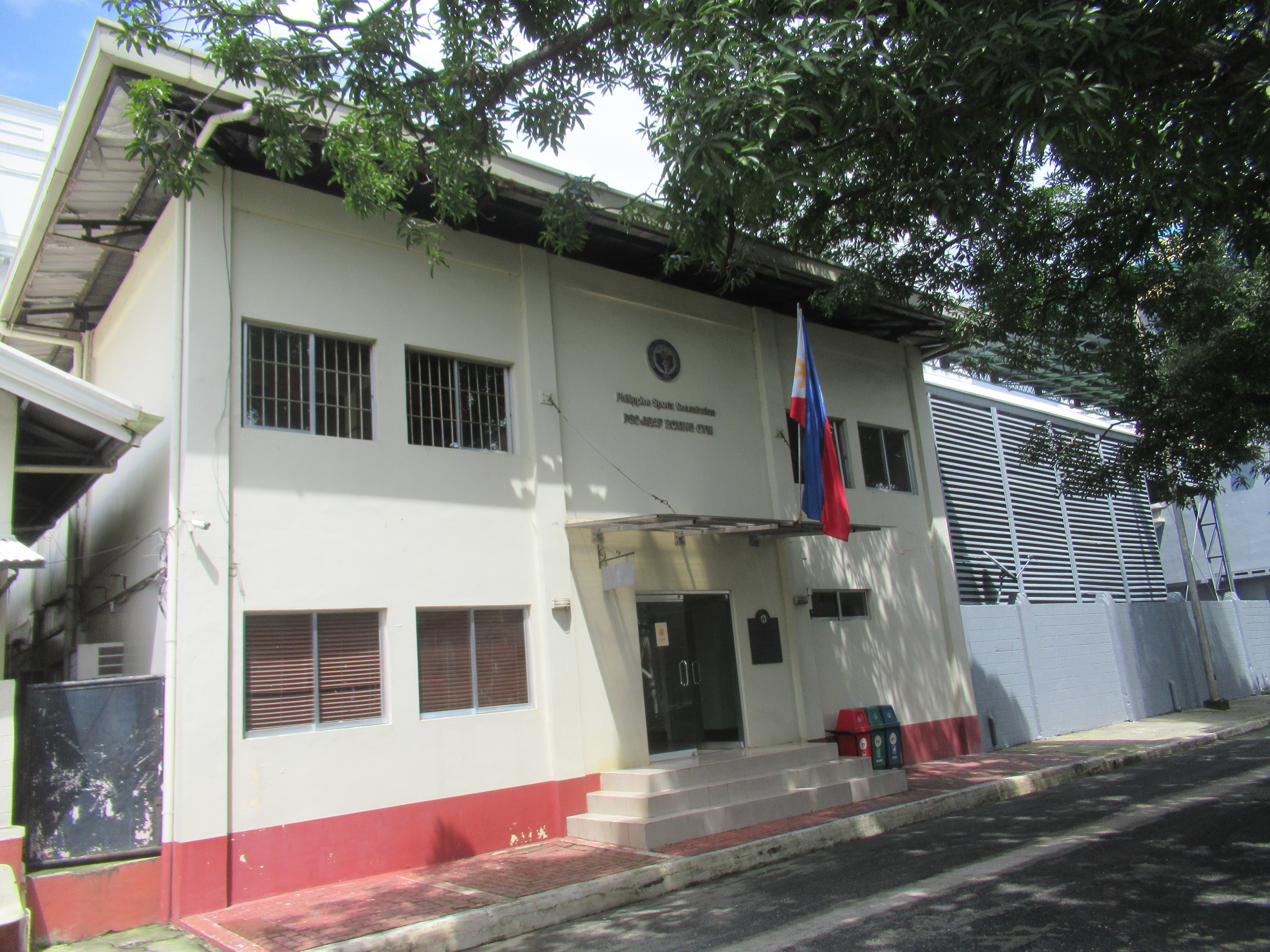
PSC-ABAP Boxing Gym

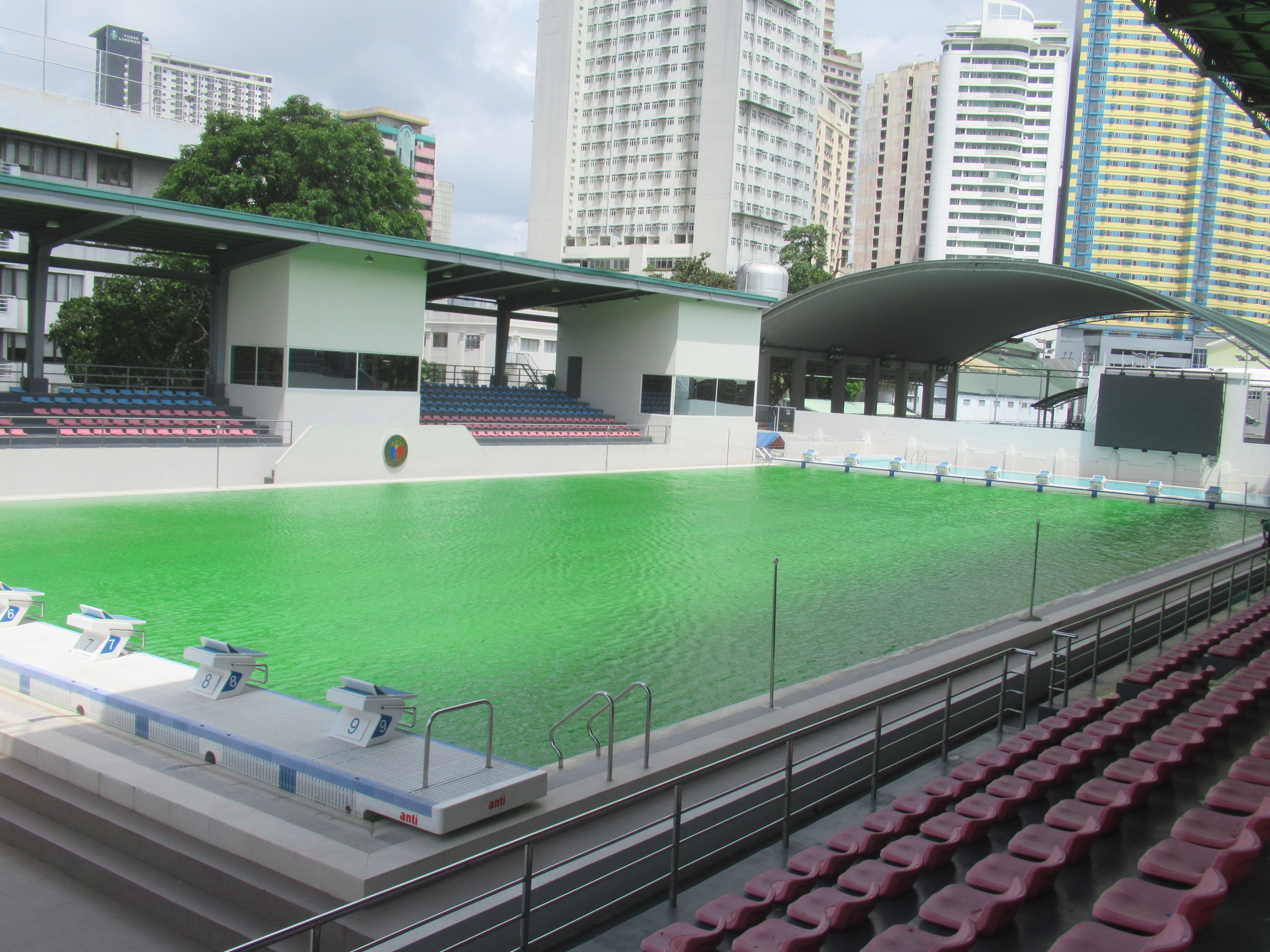
Rizal Memorial Swimming Pool

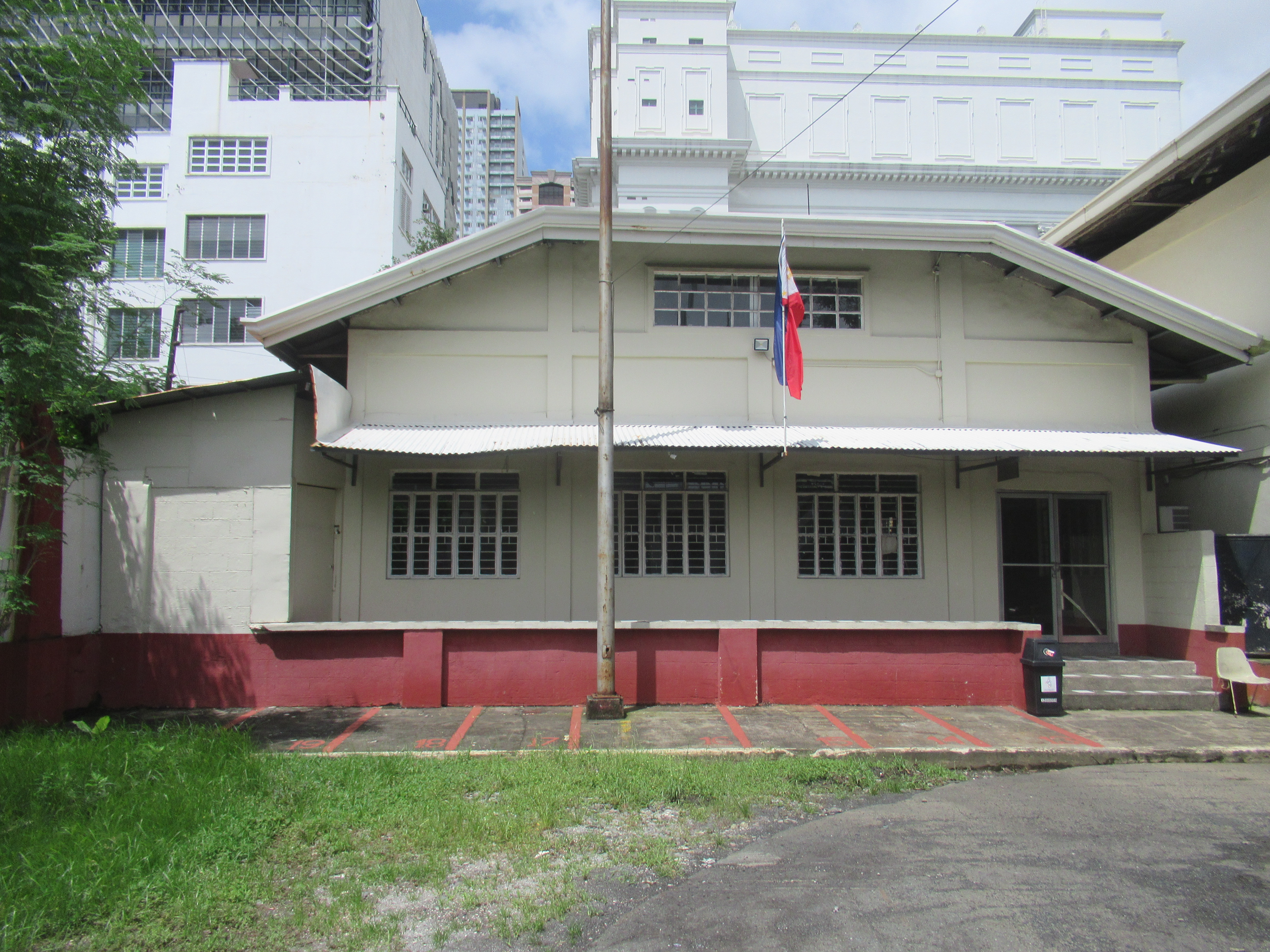
Pencak Silat Gym

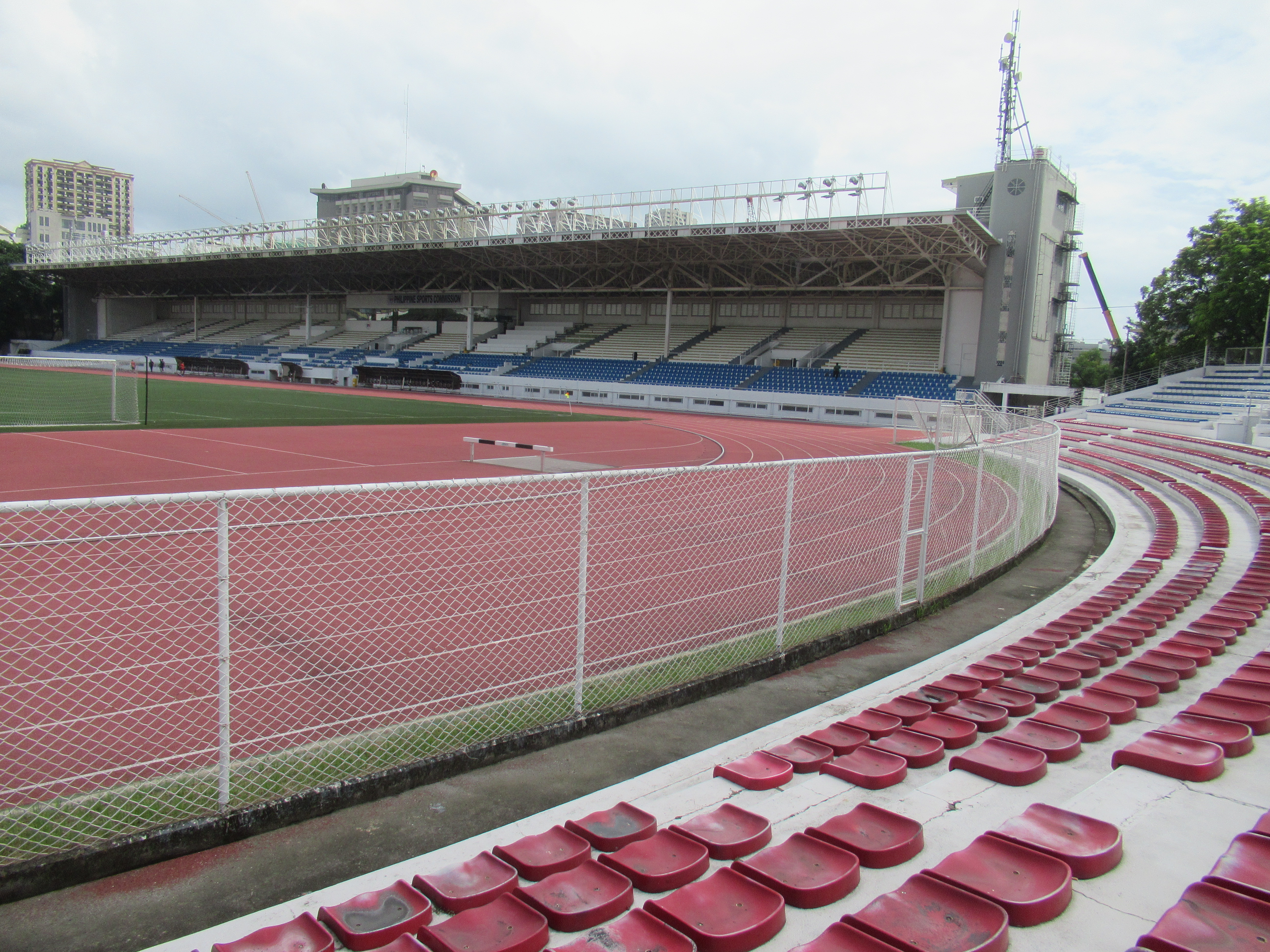
Rizal Memorial Track and Football Stadium

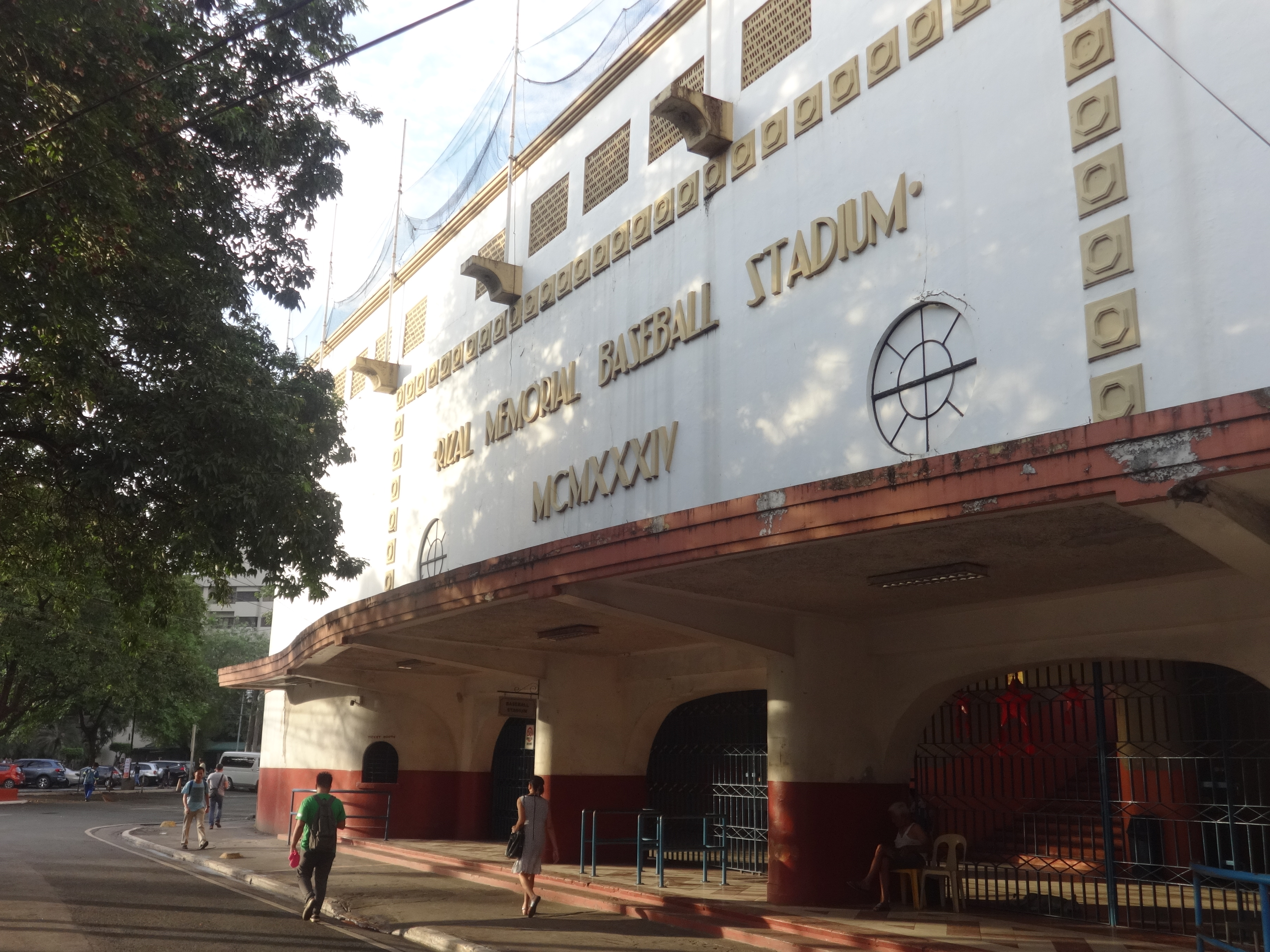
Rizal Memorial Baseball Stadium

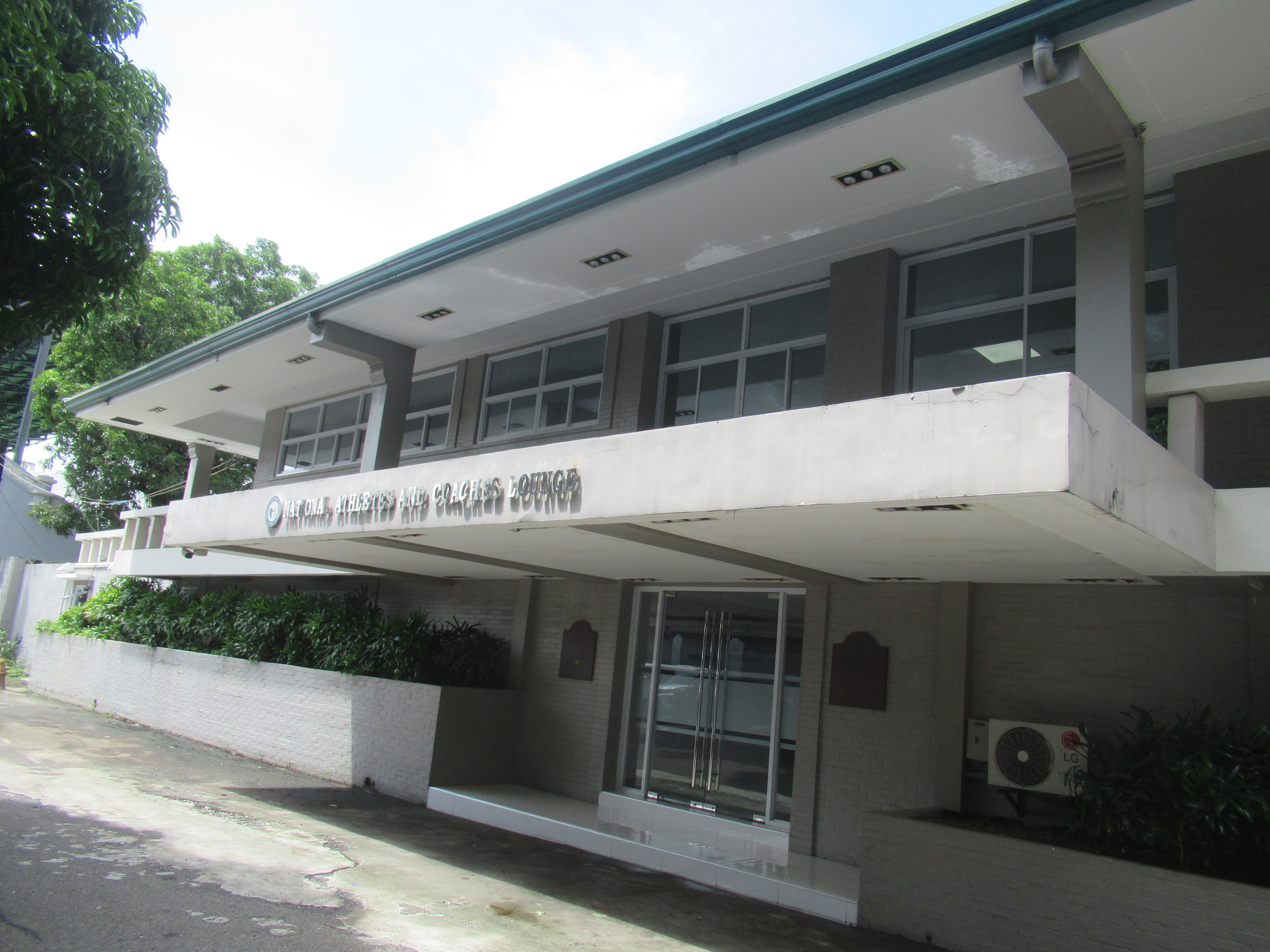
National Athletes and Coaches Lounge

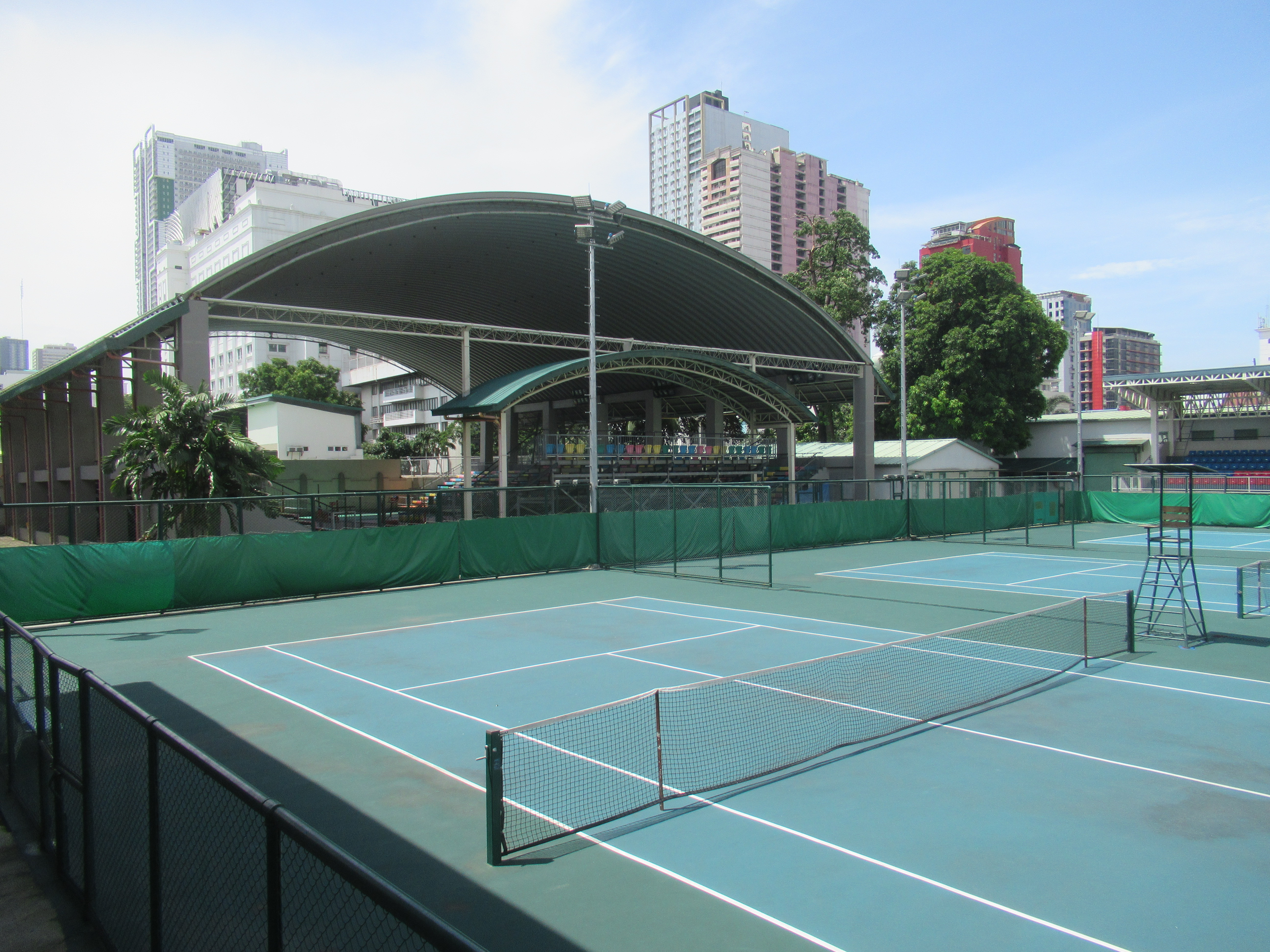
Rizal Memorial Tennis Center

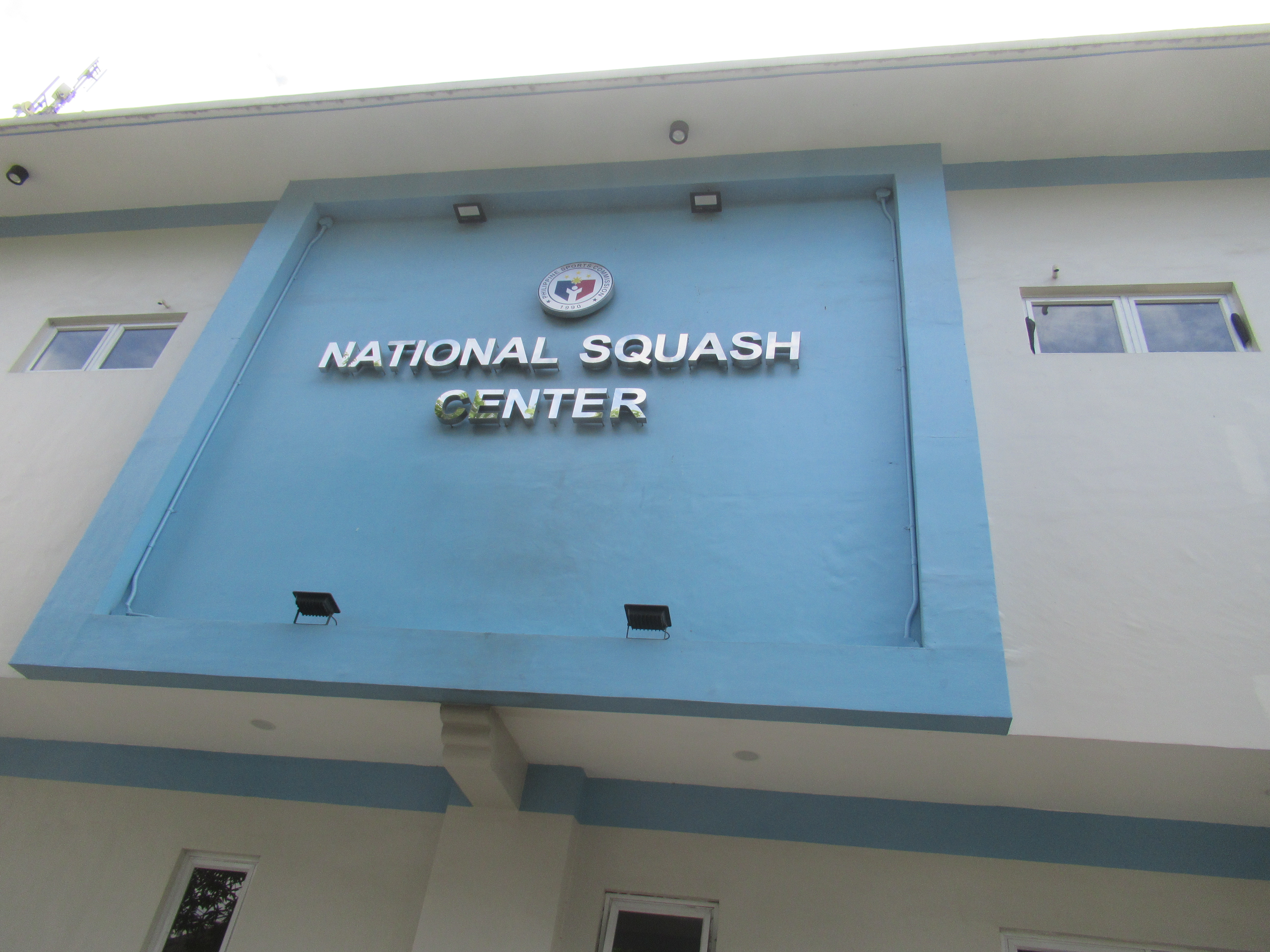
National Squash Center

== See also ==
- New Clark City Sports Hub
- PhilSports Complex
