= 1954 Asian Games =

Multi-sport event in Manila, Philippines

II Asian Games
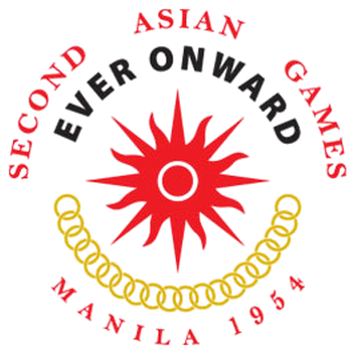
- Host city: Manila, Philippines
- Motto: Ever Onward
- Nations: 18
- Athletes: 970
- Events: 77 in 8 sports
- Opening: May 1, 1954
- Closing: May 9, 1954
- Opened by: Ramon Magsaysay; President of the Philippines
- Athlete's Oath: Martin Gison
- Judge's Oath: Antonio Delas Alas
- Torch lighter: Enriquito Beech
- Main venue: Rizal Memorial Stadium

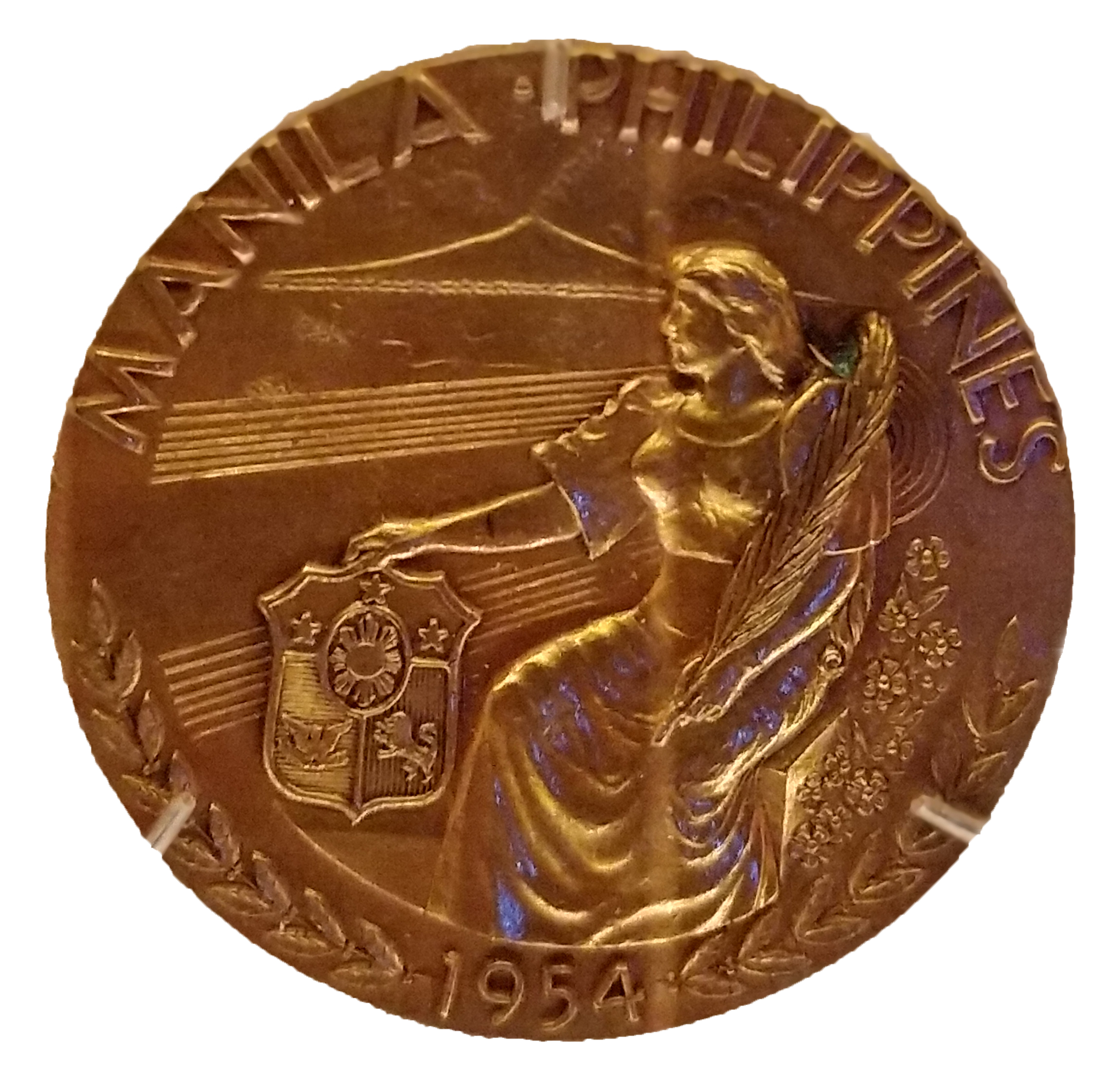
1954 Asian Games Gold Medal

The 1954 Asian Games (Filipino: Palarong Asyano 1954), officially known as the Second Asian Games – Manila 1954, were a multi-sport event held in Manila, Philippines, from May 1 to 9, 1954. A total of 970 athletes from 19 Asian National Olympic Committees (NOCs) competed in 76 events from eight sports. The number of participating NOCs and athletes were larger than the previous Asian Games held in New Delhi in 1951. This edition of the games has a different twist where it did not implement a medal tally system to determine the overall champion but a pointing system. The pointing system is a complex system where each athlete were given points according to their achievement like position in athletics or in swimming. In the end the pointing system showed to be worthless as it simply ranked the nations the same way in the medal tally system. The pointing system was not implemented in future games ever since. Jorge B. Vargas was the head of the Philippine Amateur Athletic Federation (now known as Philippine Olympic Committee since 1976) and the Manila Asian Games Organizing Committee. With the second-place finish of the Philippines, only around 9,000 spectators attended the closing ceremony at the Rizal Memorial Stadium. The events were broadcast on radio live at DZRH and DZAQ-TV ABS-3 on delayed telecast.

== Opening ceremony ==
The Games were formally opened by President Ramon Magsaysay on May 1, 1954, at 16:02 local time. Around 20,000 spectators filled the Rizal Memorial Stadium in Malate, Manila, for the opening ceremony. As requested by the IOC, the torch relay and lighting of the cauldron were excluded from the Opening Ceremony to preserve the tradition of the Olympic Games. The torch ceremony were returned at the 1958 Asian Games. The host however gave a solution by giving a special citation to the last athlete to enter the parade. The Philippines, as host, was the last country to enter the stadium. The flag bearer for the Philippines squad was Andres Franco, who won a gold medal in the 1951 Asian Games in high jump event, the sole gold medal of any Filipino in the athletics events of the previous Asian Games.

== Sports ==
Location of Manila in Philippines.

The 1954 Asian Games featured eight sports divided into 10 events, aquatics included three events namely diving, swimming and water polo. This version of the Asian Games comprised more sports and events than the last one, as six sports and seven events were in the calendar of 1951 Asian Games. Three sports—boxing, shooting and wrestling—made their debut, while cycling was dropped out.

- Athletics (30) ()
- Basketball (1) ()
- Boxing (7) ()
- Diving (4) ()
- Football (1) ()
- Shooting (6) ()
- Swimming (13) ()
- Water polo (1) ()
- Weightlifting (7) ()
- Wrestling (7) ()

== Participating nations ==
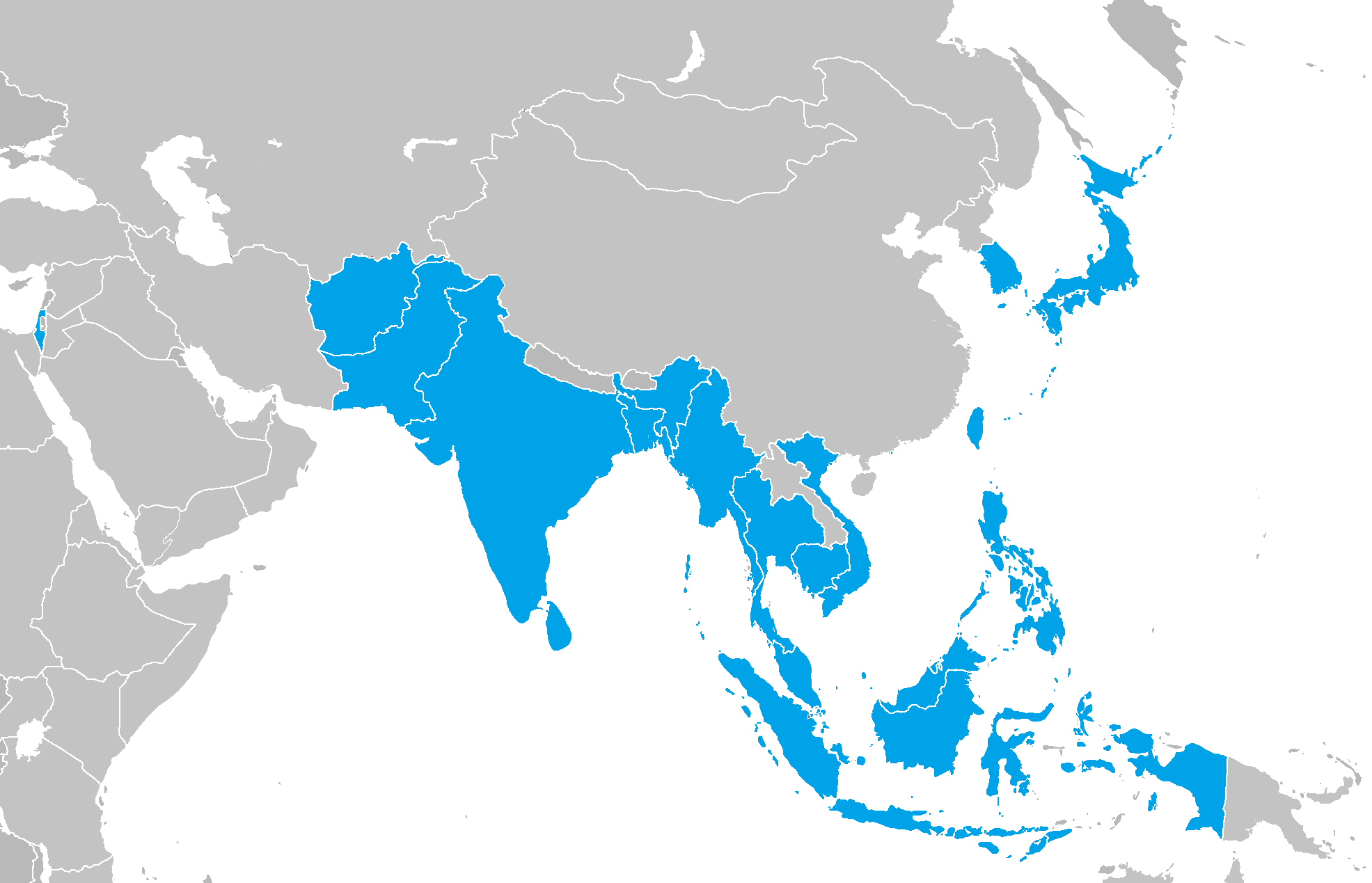
Participating NOCs.

National Olympic Committees (NOCs) are named and arranged according to their official IOC country codes and designations at the time.

Participating National Olympic Committees
- Afghanistan (17)
- Burma (34)
- Cambodia (12)
- Ceylon (6)
- Hong Kong (47)
- India (69)
- Indonesia (85)
- Israel (4)
- Japan (160)
- Malaya (9)
- North Borneo (3)
- Pakistan (46)
- Philippines (166)
- Republic of China (140)
- Singapore (54)
- South Korea (52)
- Thailand (19)
- Vietnam (165)

Non-participating National Olympic Committees
- Iran
- Nepal

Number of athletes by National Olympic Committees (by highest to lowest)

IOC Letter Code	Country	Athletes
PHI	Philippines	166
VNM	Vietnam	165
JPN	Japan	160
ROC	Republic of China	140
INA	Indonesia	85
IND	India	69
SGP	Singapore	54
KOR	South Korea	52
HKG	Hong Kong	47
PAK	Pakistan	46
BIR	Burma	34
THA	Thailand	19
AFG	Afghanistan	17
CAM	Cambodia	12
MAL	Malaya	9
CEY	Ceylon	6
ISR	Israel	4
NBO	North Borneo	3

== Calendar ==
In the following calendar for the 1954 Asian Games, each blue box represents an event competition, such as a qualification round, on that day. The yellow boxes represent days during which medal-awarding finals for a sport were held. The numeral indicates the number of event finals for each sport held that day. On the left, the calendar lists each sport with events held during the Games, and at the right, how many gold medals were won in that sport. There is a key at the top of the calendar to aid the reader.

OC	Opening ceremony	●	Event competitions	1	Event finals	CC	Closing ceremony

May 1954	2nd Sun	yuui	1st Sat	3rd Mon	4th Tue	5th Wed	6th Thu	7th Fri	8th Sat	9th Sun	Gold medals
Ceremonies			OC							CC	
Athletics	4			5	9	12					30
Basketball	●			●	●		●	●	1		1
Boxing						●	●		7		7
Diving						1	1	1	1		4
Football	●		●	●	●	●	●	●	1		1
Shooting				1	1	1	2	1			6
Swimming						1	1	5	6		13
Water polo						●	●	●	1		1
Weightlifting							1	3	3		7
Wrestling	●		●	7							7
Total gold medals	4			13	10	15	5	10	20		77
May 1954	2nd Sun		1st Sat	3rd Mon	4th Tue	5th Wed	6th Thu	7th Fri	8th Sat	9th Sun	Gold medals

== Medal table ==
Japan led the medal table, athletes from Japan won most medals, including most gold, silver and bronze. Host nation, Philippines finished second with 45 total medals (including 14 gold).

The top ten ranked NOCs at these Games are listed below. The host nation, Philippines, is highlighted.

* Host nation (Philippines)

Rank	Nation	Gold	Silver	Bronze	Total
1	Japan (JPN)	38	36	24	98
2	Philippines (PHI)*	14	14	17	45
3	South Korea (KOR)	8	6	5	19
4	Pakistan (PAK)	5	6	2	13
5	India (IND)	5	4	8	17
6	Republic of China (ROC)	2	4	7	13
7	Israel (ISR)	2	1	1	4
8	Burma (BIR)	2	0	2	4
9	Singapore (SIN)	1	4	4	9
10	Ceylon (CEY)	0	1	1	2
11–13	Remaining	0	1	4	5
Totals (13 entries)		77	77	75	229

Preceded by New Delhi	Asian Games; Manila; II Asiad (1954)	Succeeded by Tokyo
