= Japan at the 1954 Asian Games =

- IOC code: JPN
- NOC: Japanese Olympic Committee

in Manila
- Competitors: 151 (121 men, 30 women)
- Medals Ranked 1st: Gold 38 Silver 36 Bronze 24 Total 98

Asian Games appearances (overview)
- 1951; 1954; 1958; 1962; 1966; 1970; 1974; 1978; 1982; 1986; 1990; 1994; 1998; 2002; 2006; 2010; 2014; 2018; 2022; 2026

Japan participated in the 1954 Asian Games held in the capital city of Manila, Philippines. This country was ranked 1st with 38 gold medals, 36 silver medals and 24 bronze medals with a total of 98 medals to secure its top spot in the medal tally. Japan sent a total of 151 athletes to the Games, 121 men and 30 women.

== Medal summary ==
=== Medal table ===
Sport	Gold	Silver	Bronze	Total
Athletics	17	18	8	43
Swimming	9	9	7	25
Wrestling	6	1	0	7
Diving	3	3	3	9
Shooting	2	2	0	4
Boxing	1	1	3	5
Weightlifting	0	1	2	3
Water polo	0	1	0	1
Basketball	0	0	1	1
Totals (9 entries)	38	36	24	98

=== Medalists ===
Medal	Name	Sport	Event
Gold	Kanji Akagi	Athletics	Men's 400m
Gold	Yoshitaka Muroya	Athletics	Men's 800m
Gold	Osamu Inoue	Athletics	Men's 5000m
Gold	Susumu Takahashi	Athletics	Men's 3000m steeplechase
Gold	Masaji Tajima; Yoshihiro Takatani; Tomio Hosoda; Akira Kiyofuji	Athletics	Men's 4×100m relay
Gold	Akira Matsui; Yoshitaka Muroya; Nobuaki Matsuno; Kanji Akagi	Athletics	Men's 4×400m relay
Gold	Bunkichi Sawada	Athletics	Men's Pole vault
Gold	Noriaki Sagawa	Athletics	Men's Long jump
Gold	Noriaki Sagawa	Athletics	Men's Triple jump
Gold	Yoshio Kojima	Athletics	Men's Hammer throw
Gold	Atsuko Nambu	Athletics	Women's 100m
Gold	Midori Tanaka	Athletics	Women's 200m
Gold	Yoshie Takahashi	Athletics	Women's 80m hurdles
Gold	Atsuko Nambu	Athletics	Women's Long jump
Gold	Toyoko Yoshino	Athletics	Women's Shot put
Gold	Toyoko Yoshino	Athletics	Women's Discus throw
Gold	Akiko Kurihara	Athletics	Women's Javelin throw
Gold	Kazuma Fujimoto	Boxing	Men's Welterweight 67 kg
Gold	Katsuichi Mori	Diving	Men's 10 m platform
Gold	Masami Miyamoto	Diving	Women's 3 m springboard
Gold	Masami Miyamoto	Diving	Women's 10 m platform
Gold	Choji Hosaka	Shooting	Men's 50 m pistol
Gold	Masao Fujita	Shooting	Men's Trap
Gold	Hiroshi Suzuki	Swimming	Men's 100 m freestyle
Gold	Yoshihiro Shoji	Swimming	Men's 400 m freestyle
Gold	Yukiyoshi Aoki	Swimming	Men's 1500 m freestyle
Gold	Keiji Hase	Swimming	Men's 100 m backstroke
Gold	Mamoru Tanaka	Swimming	Men's 200 m breaststroke
Gold	Kenzo Yoshimura; Teijiro Tanikawa; Yukiyoshi Aoki; Hiroshi Suzuki	Swimming	Men's 4 × 200 m freestyle relay
Gold	Misako Tamura	Swimming	Women's 400 m freestyle
Gold	Masayo Aoki	Swimming	Women's 200 m breaststroke
Gold	Sadako Yamashita; Shizue Miyabe; Misako Tamura; Tomiko Atarashi	Swimming	Women's 4 × 100 m freestyle relay
Gold	Minoru Iizuka	Wrestling	Men's Bantamweight 57kg
Gold	Shigeru Kasahara	Wrestling	Men's Featherweight 62kg
Gold	Takeo Shimotori	Wrestling	Men's Lightweight 67kg
Gold	Yutaka Kaneko	Wrestling	Men's Welterweight 73kg
Gold	Kazua Katsuramoto	Wrestling	Men's Middleweight 79kg
Gold	Kenzo Fukuda	Wrestling	Men's Heavyweight +87kg
Silver	Yoshitaka Muroya	Athletics	Men's 1500m
Silver	Jiro Yamauchi	Athletics	Men's 10,000m
Silver	Yukiyoshi Kawata	Athletics	Men's 110m hurdles
Silver	Yukio Ishikawa	Athletics	Men's High jump
Silver	Toyokichi Matsumoto	Athletics	Men's Pole vault
Silver	Yoshiro Sonoda	Athletics	Men's Long jump
Silver	Yoshio Iimuro	Athletics	Men's Triple jump
Silver	Yoshio Kojima	Athletics	Men's Shot put
Silver	Fumio Nishiuchi	Athletics	Men's Decathlon
Silver	Atsuko Nambu	Athletics	Women's 200m
Silver	Miyo Miyashita	Athletics	Women's 80m hurdles
Silver	Yoshio Iimuro	Athletics	Women's Triple jump
Silver	Kimiko Okamoto; Atsuko Nambu; Michiko Iwamoto; Midori Tanaka	Athletics	Women's 4×100m relay
Silver	Miyoko Takahashi	Athletics	Women's High jump
Silver	Atsuko Nambu	Athletics	Women's Long jump
Silver	Motoko Yoshida	Athletics	Women's Shot put
Silver	Taeko Nomura	Athletics	Women's Discus throw
Silver	Yasuko Inden	Athletics	Women's Javelin throw
Silver	Yutaka Kobashi	Boxing	Men's Light middleweight 71 kg
Silver	Katsuichi Mori	Diving	Men's 3 m springboard
Silver	Shuko Sakaguchi	Diving	Women's 3 m springboard
Silver	Shuko Sakaguchi	Diving	Women's 10 m platform
Silver	Tsurukichi Kawaoka	Shooting	Men's 25 m rapid fire pistol
Silver	Tokusaburo Iwata	Shooting	Men's Trap
Silver	Teijiro Tanikawa	Swimming	Men's 100 m freestyle
Silver	Katsuji Yamashita	Swimming	Men's 400 m freestyle
Silver	Shichiro Shintaku	Swimming	Men's 1500 m freestyle
Silver	Norihiko Kurahashi	Swimming	Men's 100 m backstroke
Silver	Masaru Furakawa	Swimming	Men's 200 m breaststroke
Silver	Tomiko Atarashi	Swimming	Women's 100 m freestyle
Silver	Akiko Miyazaki	Swimming	Women's 400 m freestyle
Silver	Keiko Sadamori	Swimming	Women's 100 m backstroke
Silver	Kazuko Sakamoto	Swimming	Women's 200 breaststroke
Silver	Minoru Kubota	Weightlifting	Men's Lightweight 67.5 kg
Silver	Yushu Kitano	Wrestling	Men's Flyweight 52kg
Silver	Hachiro Arakawa; Hirobumi Chige; Shunichi Hiroshiga; Teruyoshi Kanda; Shinichiro Koga; Takayoshi Matsufuji; Osamu Miyabe; Takanao Sado; Haosue Tajina; Nisei Tashiro	Water polo	Men's Team
Bronze	Michio Ueki	Athletics	Men's 800m
Bronze	Michio Ueki	Athletics	Men's 1500m
Bronze	Takehiko Nakajima	Athletics	Men's 110m hurdles
Bronze	Haruo Nagayasu	Athletics	Men's Javelin throw
Bronze	Mieko Muro	Athletics	Women's High jump
Bronze	Mikiko Tazaki	Athletics	Women's Long jump
Bronze	Yuriko Mizoguchi	Athletics	Women's Shot put
Bronze	Yuriko Mizoguchi	Athletics	Women's Discus throw
Bronze	Hirokazu Arai; Jyunya Arai; Riichi Arai; Takashi Itoyama; Takeshi Kinoshita; Hitoshi Konno; Hisashi Nagashima; Shozo Noguchi; Hiroshi Saito; Shigeuji Saito; Shutaro Shoji; Takeo Sugiyama	Basketball	Men's Team
Bronze	Kichio Miyake	Swimming	Men's Bantamweight 54 kg
Bronze	Hiroshi Iwabuchi	Boxing	Men's Lightweight 60 kg
Bronze	Hisao Inoue	Boxing	Men's Light welterweight 63.5 kg
Bronze	Yutaka Baba	Diving	Men's 3 m springboard
Bronze	Kanoko Tsutani	Diving	Women's 3 m springboard
Bronze	Kanoko Tsutani	Diving	Women's 10 m platform
Bronze	Tsutomu Nagashima	Swimming	Men's 1500 m freestyle
Bronze	Takuro Ashida	Swimming	Men's 100 m backstroke
Bronze	Masao Togami	Swimming	Men's 200 m breaststroke
Bronze	Shizue Miyabe	Swimming	Women's 100 m freestyle
Bronze	Yoshiko Sato	Swimming	Women's 400 m freestyle
Bronze	Midori Morimae	Swimming	Women's 100 m backstroke
Bronze	Chizuko Urahata	Swimming	Women's 200 m breaststroke
Bronze	Yoshio Nanbu	Weightlifting	Bantamweight 56 kg
Bronze	Hachiro Fujiwara	Weightlifting	Middleweight 75 kg
