= Athletics at the 1954 Asian Games =

- Dates: 2–5 May 1954

Athletics was contested at the 1954 Asian Games in Manila, Philippines from May 2 to May 5.

== Medalists ==
=== Men ===
Event	Gold		Silver		Bronze	
100 m	Abdul Khaliq; Pakistan	10.6 =GR	Genaro Cabrera; Philippines	10.7	Marian Gabriel; India	10.8
200 m	Muhammad Sharif Butt; Pakistan	21.9	Khwaja Muhammad Aslam; Pakistan	22.0	Stephen Xavier; Hong Kong	22.2
400 m	Kanji Akagi; Japan	48.5; GR	Joginder Singh Dhanaor; India	48.6	Chen Ying-long; Republic of China	48.6
800 m	Yoshitaka Muroya; Japan	1:54.5; GR	Sohan Singh Dhanoa; India	1:54.6	Michio Ueki; Japan	1:55.8
1500 m	Choi Yoon-chil; South Korea	3:56.2; GR	Yoshitaka Muroya; Japan	3:58.0	Michio Ueki; Japan	3:59.0
5000 m	Osamu Inoue; Japan	15:00.2; GR	Choi Yoon-chil; South Korea	15:03.8	Dalu Ram; India	15:14.1
10,000 m	Choi Chung-sik; South Korea	33:06.0; GR	Jiro Yamauchi; Japan	34:06.2	Pi Li-ming; Republic of China	35:43.2
110 m hurdles	Sarwan Singh; India	14.7; GR	Yukiyoshi Kawata; Japan	14.8	Takehiko Nakajima; Japan	14.8
400 m hurdles	Mirza Khan; Pakistan	54.1; GR	Chan Onn Leng; Singapore	54.8	Jaime Pimentel; Philippines	55.6
3000 m steeplechase	Susumu Takahashi; Japan	9:15.0; GR	Yasumasa Shirasagi; Japan	9:35.0	Dalu Ram; India	9:36.5
4 × 100 m relay	Japan; Masaji Tajima; Yoshihiro Takatani; Tomio Hosoda; Akira Kiyofuji	41.2; GR	Pakistan; Muhammad Sharif Butt; Abdul Aziz; Abdul Khaliq; Khwaja Muhammad Aslam	41.5	Philippines; Gaspar Azares; Eusebio Ensong; Pedro Subido; Genaro Cabrera	42.2
4 × 400 m relay	Japan; Akira Matsui; Yoshitaka Muroya; Nobuaki Matsuno; Kanji Akagi	3:17.4; GR	India; J. B. Joseph; Ivan Jacob; Joginder Singh Dhanaor; Harjeet Singh	3:18.0	Philippines; Mauricio Paubaya; Ernesto Rodriguez; Cipriano Nuera; Pablo Somblingo	3:21.6
High jump	Ajit Singh Balla; India	1.95; GR	Yukio Ishikawa; Japan	1.95 =GR	Andres Franco; Philippines	1.95 =GR
Pole vault	Bunkichi Sawada; Japan	4.06	Toyokichi Matsumoto; Japan	3.91	Lai Yu-tao; Republic of China	3.60
Long jump	Noriaki Sagawa; Japan	7.02	Yoshiro Sonoda; Japan	6.94	Lin Te-sheng; Republic of China	6.86
Triple jump	Noriaki Sagawa; Japan	15.13	Yoshio Iimuro; Japan	14.88	Choi Yong-kee; South Korea	14.71
Shot put	Parduman Singh Brar; India	14.14; GR	Yoshio Kojima; Japan	13.73	Ishar Singh; India	13.43
Discus throw	Parduman Singh Brar; India	43.37; GR	Chi Pei-lin; Republic of China	41.66	Liu Ching; Republic of China	41.18
Hammer throw	Yoshio Kojima; Japan	53.99; GR	Muhammad Iqbal; Pakistan	51.80	Song Kyo-sik; South Korea	50.80
Javelin throw	Muhammad Nawaz; Pakistan	64.26; GR	Jalal Khan; Pakistan	63.28	Haruo Nagayasu; Japan	56.26
Decathlon	Yang Chuan-kwang; Republic of China	5454	Fumio Nishiuchi; Japan	5429	Ronnie O'Brien; India	5259

=== Women ===
Event	Gold		Silver		Bronze	
100 m	Atsuko Nambu; Japan	12.5 =GR	Mary Klass; Singapore	12.5 =GR	Christine Brown; India	12.6
200 m	Midori Tanaka; Japan	26.0	Atsuko Nambu; Japan	26.1	Inocencia Solis; Philippines	26.5
80 m hurdles	Michiko Iwamoto; Japan	11.7; GR	Miyo Miyashita; Japan	12.0	Tang Pui Wah; Singapore	12.1
4 × 100 m relay	India; Christine Brown; Stephie D'Souza; Violet Peters; Mary D'Souza	49.5; GR	Japan; Michiko Iwamoto; Kimiko Okamoto; Midori Tanaka; Atsuko Nambu	49.6	Philippines; Rogelia Ferrer; Manolita Cinco; Roberta Anore; Inocencia Solis	50.4
High jump	Ahuva Kraus; Israel	1.55; GR	Miyoko Takahashi; Japan	1.52	Mieko Muro; Japan	1.52
Long jump	Yoshie Takahashi; Japan	5.68	Atsuko Nambu; Japan	5.64	Mikiko Tozaki; Japan	5.36
Shot put	Toyoko Yoshino; Japan	12.31; GR	Motoko Yoshida; Japan	12.27	Yuriko Mizoguchi; Japan	11.81
Discus throw	Toyoko Yoshino; Japan	42.89; GR	Taeko Nomura; Japan	39.97	Yuriko Mizoguchi; Japan	37.12
Javelin throw	Akiko Kurihara; Japan	44.07; GR	Yasuko Inden; Japan	42.28	Vivencia Subido; Philippines	37.56

== Medal table ==
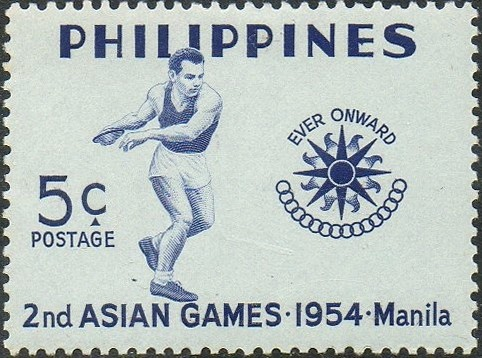
Athletics at the 1954 Asian Games on a stamp of the Philippines

Rank	Nation	Gold	Silver	Bronze	Total
1	Japan (JPN)	17	18	8	43
2	India (IND)	5	3	6	14
3	Pakistan (PAK)	4	4	0	8
4	South Korea (KOR)	2	1	2	5
5	Republic of China (ROC)	1	1	5	7
6	Israel (ISR)	1	0	0	1
7	Singapore (SIN)	0	2	1	3
8	Philippines (PHI)	0	1	7	8
9	Hong Kong (HKG)	0	0	1	1
Totals (9 entries)		30	30	30	90
