= India at the 1954 Asian Games =

- IOC code: IND
- NOC: Indian Olympic Association

in Manila
- Medals Ranked 5th: Gold 5 Silver 4 Bronze 8 Total 17

Asian Games appearances (overview)
- 1951; 1954; 1958; 1962; 1966; 1970; 1974; 1978; 1982; 1986; 1990; 1994; 1998; 2002; 2006; 2010; 2014; 2018; 2022; 2026

India participated in the 1954 Asian Games held in Manila, Philippines from 1 May 1954 to 9 May 1954. India was ranked fifth with 5 gold medals, 4 silver medals and 8 bronze medals in the overall medal table, in the second edition of the Asian Games.

Parduman Singh Brar won two gold medals in athletics. K. P. Thakkar won a bronze medal in diving.

As of the conclusion of the 2022 Asian Games, 1954 remains the last edition where India won any medals in diving.

== Medal summary ==
=== Medals by sport ===
Medals by sport
Sport	Rank	Gold	Silver	Bronze	Total
Athletics	2	5	3	6	14
Wrestling	5	0	1	1	2
Diving	3	0	0	1	1
Total	5	5	4	8	17

=== Medals by day ===
Medals by day
Day	Date	Gold	Silver	Bronze	Total
1	1 May	0	0	0	0
2	2 May	2	0	0	2
3	3 May	0	1	2	3
4	4 May	1	1	4	6
5	5 May	2	2	1	5
6	6 May	0	0	0	0
7	7 May	0	0	0	0
8	8 May	0	0	1	1
9	9 May	0	0	0	0
	Total	5	4	8	17

=== Medals by gender ===
Medals by gender
Gender	Gold	Silver	Bronze	Total
Male	4	4	7	15
Female	1	0	1	2
Total	5	4	8	17

=== Medalists ===
Medal	Name	Sport	Event	Date
Gold	Parduman Singh Brar	Athletics	Men's discus throw	2 May
Gold	Ajit Singh Balla	Athletics	Men's high jump	2 May
Gold	Sarwan Singh	Athletics	Men's 110 m hurdles	4 May
Gold	Parduman Singh Brar	Athletics	Men's shot put	5 May
Gold	Christine Brown; Stephie D'Souza; Violet Peters; Mary D'Souza	Athletics	Women's 4 × 100 m relay	5 May
Silver	B. G. Kashid	Wrestling	Men's lightweight 67 kg	3 May
Silver	Joginder Singh Dhanaor	Athletics	Men's 400 m	4 May
Silver	Sohan Singh Dhanoa	Athletics	Men's 800 m	5 May
Silver	Joginder Singh Dhanaor; Ivan Jacob; Harjeet Singh; J. B. Joseph	Athletics	Men's 4 × 400 m relay	5 May
Bronze	Dalu Ram	Athletics	Men's 5000 m	3 May
Bronze	Sohan Singh	Wrestling	Men's middleweight 79 kg	3 May
Bronze	Marian Gabriel	Athletics	Men's 100 m	4 May
Bronze	Dalu Ram	Athletics	Men's 3000 m steeplechase	4 May
Bronze	Ronnie O'Brien	Athletics	Men's decathlon	4 May
Bronze	Christine Brown	Athletics	Women's 100 m	4 May
Bronze	Ishar Singh Deol	Athletics	Men's shot put	5 May
Bronze	K. P. Thakkar	Diving	Men's 10 m platform	8 May

== Football ==
Head coach: (India) Balaidas Chatterjee

No.	Pos.	Player	Date of birth (age)	Club
	GK	Sanjeeva Uchil		(All India Football Federation) Bombay
	GK	Sanat Sett		(All India Football Federation) Bengal
	DF	Sailen Manna (c)	1 September 1924 (aged 29)	(All India Football Federation) Mohun Bagan
	DF	Sayed Khwaja Aziz-ud-Din	12 July 1930 (aged 23)	(All India Football Federation) Hyderabad City Police
	DF	Thenmadom Varghese		(All India Football Federation) Bombay
	DF	Anthony Patrick		(All India Football Federation) Hyderabad City Police
	MF	Noor Muhammad		(All India Football Federation) Hyderabad City Police
	MF	Chandan Singh Rawat	26 July 1928 (aged 25)	(All India Football Federation) Bengal
	MF	Amal Dutta	26 July 1928 (aged 25)	(All India Football Federation) Bengal
	MF	G.R. Gokul		(All India Football Federation) Bengal
	FW	Sayed Moinuddin		(All India Football Federation) Hyderabad City Police
	FW	Ahmed Khan	24 December 1926 (aged 27)	(All India Football Federation) Hyderabad
	FW	Joe D'Sa	3 August 1932 (aged 21)	(All India Football Federation) Bombay
	FW	Krishna Kittu		(All India Football Federation) Bengal
	FW	Anthony Braganza		(All India Football Federation) Bombay
	FW	M. Jayaram		(All India Football Federation) Services
	FW	Thangarajan		(All India Football Federation) Madras

=== Preliminary round ===
Team	Pld	W	D	L	GF	GA	GD	Pts
Indonesia	2	2	0	0	9	3	+6	4
India	2	1	0	1	3	6	−3	2
Japan	2	0	0	2	5	8	−3	0

3 May

India	3–2	Japan
Moinuddin 6', 28'; Joe D'Sa 42'	Report	Takabayashi 47'; Kawamoto 78'

Rizal Memorial Stadium, Manila

5 May

India	0–4	Indonesia
	Report	Dhalhar 28' (pen.), 80'; Ramang 51', 69'

Rizal Memorial Stadium, Manila

== See also ==
- G. Muthuraj
