= Khwaja Muhammad Aslam =

Pakistani athlete (1922–2019)

Khawaja Muhammad Aslam
Personal information
- Nationality: Pakistani
- Born: 8 February 1922
- Died: 23 July 2019 (aged 97)

Sport
- Country: Pakistan
- Sport: Athletics
- Event: Sprinting
Medal record
Men's athletics
Representing Pakistan
Asian Games
Silver medal – second place	1954 Manila	200 m
Silver medal – second place	1954 Manila	4 × 100 m relay

Khawaja Muhammad Aslam (8 February 1922 – 23 July 2019) was a Pakistani athlete who represented Pakistan at the 1954 Asian Games in athletics. He won the silver medal in the 200 m event with the time of 22 seconds. The gold medal also went to another Pakistani athlete, Muhammad Sharif Butt, with the time of 21.9 seconds.

Aslam also competed in the 100m and 200m events, as well as the 4×100 m relay at the 1952 Summer Olympics in Helsinki. He finished fifth in the 1954 British Empire and Commonwealth Games 4×110 yards relay (with Abdul Aziz, Abdul Khaliq, and Muhammad Sharif Butt). In the 1954 British Empire and Commonwealth Games, in the 100 yards and the 220 yards event, Aslam could not advance beyond the heats.

Aslam died on 23 July 2019 at the age of 97 in Pakistan. He was the father of Olympian field hockey player Khawaja Junaid.

== Competition record ==
Year	Competition	Venue	Position	Event	Notes
Representing Pakistan
1952	Olympics	Helsinki, Finland	4th, Qtr 1	100 m	11.02/10.9

== See also ==
- List of Pakistani records in athletics
- Athletics in Pakistan
- Pakistan at the Olympics
