= Athletics in Pakistan =

- Governing body: Athletics Federation of Pakistan

International competitions
- Olympic Games (gold) x1 Paralympic Games (gold) x1 (silver) x1 (bronze) x2 World Championships (silver) x1 Asian Championships (gold) x3 (silver) x3 (bronze) x3 Asian Games (gold) x14 (silver) x13 (bronze) x13 Commonwealth Games (gold) x3 (silver) x3 (bronze) x6 Islamic Solidarity Games (gold) x2 (silver) x2 (bronze) x1 Asian Indoor Championships (silver) x1 (bronze) x1 Asian Cross Country Championships (silver) x1 (bronze) x1 South Asian Games (gold) x48 (silver) x57 (bronze) x91

Athletics in Pakistan is overseen by the Athletics Federation of Pakistan (AFP) which organizes athletic tournaments in Pakistan. Athletics in Pakistan encompasses a diverse range of competitive sporting events, including running, jumping, throwing, and walking disciplines. The country's athletics landscape is dominated by four primary categories: track and field, road running, cross country running, and racewalking.

== History ==
Many Pakistani athletes have excelled in various global events including the Olympic Games, Asian Games, Commonwealth Games and World Athletics Championships.

The 1950s and 1960s are often regarded as the Golden Age of Pakistani athletics, with Abdul Khaliq, Ghulam Raziq, Mubarak Shah, Muhammad Iqbal, Muhammad Nawaz, Jalal Khan, Allah Ditta and Muhammad Ramzan Ali achieving various milestones. In the early decades, Pakistanis held many Asian records including the Asian 100 m and 200 m record held by Abdul Khaliq.

Other notable athletes include Muhammad Younis, Muhammad Siddique, Mirza Khan, Ghulam Abbas, Nadir Khan, John Permal, Aqarab Abbas, Muhammad Sharif Butt, Khwaja Muhammad Aslam, Muhammad Sadaqat, Muhammad Fayyaz, Abdul Aziz, Abdul Malik, Syed Meesaq Rizvi, Mohammad Mansha, Mohsin Ali, Mehboob Ali, Banarus Muhammad Khan, Rashid Khan, Abdul Rashid, Zafar Iqbal, Nusrat Iqbal Sahi, Norman Brinkworth, Muhammad Youssef, Allah Ditta, Muhammad Ayub, Muhammad Yasir and Liaquat Ali who got prominence at either Asian or International levels, winning gold medals for Pakistan. Haider Ali is Pakistan's most successful para-athlete, holding the distinction of winning the country's first ever Paralympic gold, silver, and bronze medals. He won a silver medal in the long jump in 2008 and a bronze in 2016. He switched to discus throw, an event in which he won a gold medal in 2020 and a bronze medal in 2024. His achievements have made him an icon in Pakistani sports and a source of inspiration for many. He is the first and only Pakistani to have won four medals at the Paralympic Games. Female athletes have also represented Pakistan at the international level, including Shabana Akhtar, who was the first Pakistani female athlete to participate at the Olympics. Among Pakistan's notable women athletes are Naseem Hameed, Najma Parveen, Sadaf Siddiqui, Rabia Ashiq, Shazia Hidayat, Faiqa Riaz and Sumaira Zahoor.

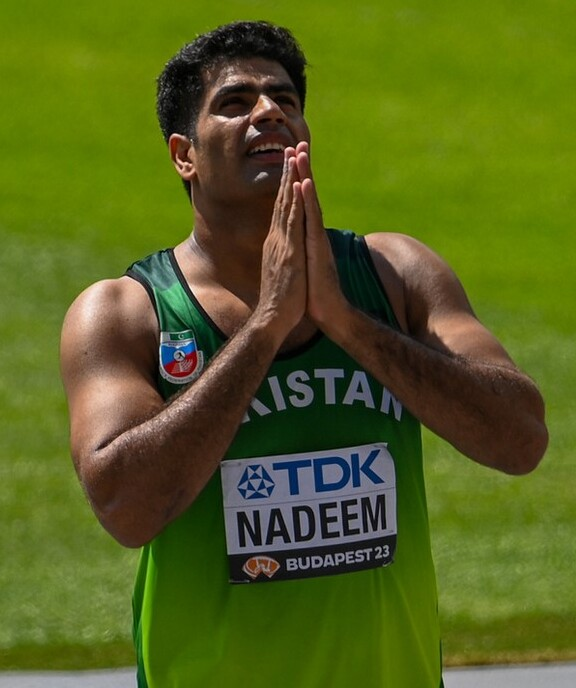
Arshad Nadeem, javelin thrower and Pakistan's first Olympic Gold medallist in athletics.

In recent times, Arshad Nadeem is the reigning Olympic champion in Men's javelin throw with an Asian and Olympic record throw of 92.97 metres (305.0 ft) at the 2024 Summer Olympics. He is the first Pakistani track and field athlete to earn direct qualification for the Olympics under modern entry standards, and the first Pakistani athlete to reach the final of any event at the World Championships. At the 2024 Summer Olympics, he became the first Pakistani ever to win an Olympic medal in athletics and the country’s first individual Olympic gold medalist.

In 2023, he became the first Pakistani athlete to win a medal at the World Athletics Championships, a silver. In 2022, he also created a Commonwealth Games record with a throw of 90.18 m and became the first ever athlete from South Asia to breach the 90m mark.

== Hosting rights ==
=== Multi-Sport Events ===
Pakistan has hosted several major international athletics events including the athletics competitions at the 1989, 2004 South Asian Games and is scheduled to host the 2027 edition.

=== Cross-Country Championships ===
Pakistan hosted the 2025 SAAF Cross Country Championships on 23rd February 2025 at Fatima Jinnah Park, Islamabad. The event featured a senior men's 10 km and junior (U‑20) 8 km race with athletes from Pakistan, Sri Lanka, Nepal, Bangladesh, and the Maldives. Pakistan won gold in both categories, followed by Sri Lanka and Bangladesh in the senior race, and Sri Lanka and Nepal in the junior race.

=== Marathons and Road Races ===
International events such as the Lahore Marathon also take place in the country. It was Pakistan's first international marathon, held on 30 January 2005. It featured approximately 60 elite international athletes from 20 different countries.

The Karachi Marathon is Pakistan's first World Athletics and AIMS certified marathon, organized as part of the Vision 2032 initiative to help Pakistani athletes qualify for major world marathons and the Olympics. The sponsors announced they would send the men's and women's winners to compete in the London Marathon to boost the international profile of local athletes.

The Lok Sahaita Marathon, held annually in Sukkur, is Pakistan's second World Athletics recognized marathon. The event attracts elite athletes from over 10 countries, with thousands of local participants. In the 2025 edition, Morocco's Alyoussouf Abdelmajid won the marathon title (2:22:35), while Kenya's Munyoni Mutoko won the women's 10K race (40:25).

The Islamabad Marathon, organized by Islamabad Run With Us (IRU), is Pakistan's premier annual road running event, held since 2020. The 2022 race marked the first-ever full marathon in the federal capital, with President Arif Alvi and First Lady Samina Alvi participating in the 10 km run. The event features five categories: Full Marathon (42.2 km), Half Marathon (21.1 km), 10 km, 5 km, and a Kids' Fun Run, drawing thousands of participants from over 30 countries.

=== 1960 International Lahore Meet ===
The 1960 Triangular Athletics Meet in Lahore was a major international invitational event featuring teams from Pakistan, India, and Iran. Pakistan won the overall competition, securing 10 out of 20 gold medals. A notable moment occurred when India's Milkha Singh defeated Pakistan's Abdul Khaliq in the 200m dash, leading to Singh being nicknamed the "Flying Sikh". In this meet, Khaliq won a gold medal in the 100-meter race with a time of 10.4 seconds, a bronze medal in the 200-meter race, and another gold medal in the 4 x 100-meter relay race, clocking 41.5 seconds. This event was depicted in the Indian movie Bhaag Milkha Bhaag.

== National Championships ==
National Athletics Championships is held annually by the Athletics Federation of Pakistan.

== Major international medallists ==
Competition	Athlete	Medal	Event	Year
Olympic Games	Arshad Nadeem	1st place, gold medalist(s)	Javelin throw	2024
Paralympic Games	Haider Ali	3rd place, bronze medalist(s)	Discus Throw - F37	2024
Paralympic Games	Haider Ali	1st place, gold medalist(s)	Discus Throw - F37	2020
Paralympic Games	Haider Ali	3rd place, bronze medalist(s)	Long Jump - T37	2016
Paralympic Games	Haider Ali	2nd place, silver medalist(s)	Long Jump - F37/38	2008
World Championships	Arshad Nadeem	2nd place, silver medalist(s)	Javelin throw	2023
Commonwealth Games
Commonwealth Games	Arshad Nadeem	1st place, gold medalist(s)	Javelin throw	2022
Commonwealth Games	Muhammad Nawaz	3rd place, bronze medalist(s)	Javelin throw	1966
Commonwealth Games	Muhammad Iqbal	3rd place, bronze medalist(s)	Hammer throw	1966
Commonwealth Games	Ghulam Raziq	3rd place, bronze medalist(s)	120 yards hurdles	1966
Commonwealth Games	Ghulam Raziq	1st place, gold medalist(s)	120 yards hurdles	1962
Commonwealth Games	Jalal Khan	2nd place, silver medalist(s)	Javelin throw	1958
Commonwealth Games	Muhammad Iqbal	2nd place, silver medalist(s)	Hammer throw	1958
Commonwealth Games	Muhammad Ramzan Ali	3rd place, bronze medalist(s)	Long jump	1958
Commonwealth Games	Ghulam Raziq	3rd place, bronze medalist(s)	120 yards hurdles	1958
Commonwealth Games	Muhammad Iqbal	1st place, gold medalist(s)	Hammer throw	1954
Commonwealth Games	Muhammad Nawaz	2nd place, silver medalist(s)	Javelin throw	1954
Commonwealth Games	Jalal Khan	3rd place, bronze medalist(s)	Javelin throw	1954

== Notable performance at Summer Olympics ==
Athlete(s)	Event	Games	Result
Arshad Nadeem	Men's Javelin Throw	2024 Paris	1st place (gold) (92.97m) OR
Arshad Nadeem	Men's Javelin Throw	2020 Tokyo	5th place in Final (84.62m)
Bashir Ahmed, Mohammad Sadaqat, Mohammad Afzal, Muhammad Fayyaz	Men's 4 × 400 metres relay	1988 Seoul	Semi-Final
Muhammad Iqbal	Men's hammer throw	1960 Rome	12th place in Final (61.79m)
Abdul Malik, Muhammad Ramzan Ali, Ghulam Raziq, Abdul Khaliq	Men's 4 x 100 metres relay	1960 Rome	Semi-Final
Ghulam Raziq	Men's 110 metres hurdles	1960 Rome	4th in Semi-Final heat
Abdul Aziz, Muhammad Sharif Butt, Abdul Khaliq, Ghulam Raziq	Men's 4 x 100 metres relay	1956 Melbourne	Semi-Final
Ghulam Raziq	Men's 110 metres hurdles	1956 Melbourne	Semi-Final
Abdul Khaliq	Men's 200 metres	1956 Melbourne	4th in Semi-Final heat – Stands in top seven athletes
Abdul Khaliq	Men's 100 metres	1956 Melbourne	4th in Semi-Final heat
Muhammad Iqbal	Men's hammer throw	1956 Melbourne	11th place in Final (56.97m)
Muhammad Nawaz	Men's javelin throw	1956 Melbourne	14th place in Final (62.55m)
Muhammad Aslam, Abdul Aziz, Muhammad Shariff Butt, Muhammad Fazil	Men's 4 x 100 metres relay	1952 Helsinki	Semi-Final

== Total medals won by Pakistani athletes in major tournaments ==
Competition	Gold	Silver	Bronze	Total
Olympics	1	0	0	1
Paralympics	1	1	2	4
World Championships	0	1	0	1
Commonwealth Games	3	3	6	12
Asian Games	14	13	13	40
Islamic Solidarity Games	2	2	1	5
Asian Championships	3	3	3	9
Asian Indoor Championships	0	1	1	2
Asian Cross Country Championships	0	1	1	2
South Asian Games	48	57	91	196
Total	72	82	118	272

Correct as of the conclusion of 2026 Asian Games.

== See also ==
- Sport in Pakistan
- List of Pakistani records in athletics
