= Pakistan at the 1952 Summer Olympics =

- IOC code: PAK
- NOC: National Olympic Committee of Pakistan
- Website: www.nocpakistan.org

in Helsinki
- Competitors: 38 in 7 sports
- Flag bearer: Mohammad Niaz Khan
- Medals: Gold 0 Silver 0 Bronze 0 Total 0

Summer Olympics appearances (overview)
- 1948; 1952; 1956; 1960; 1964; 1968; 1972; 1976; 1980; 1984; 1988; 1992; 1996; 2000; 2004; 2008; 2012; 2016; 2020; 2024; 2028

Other related appearances
- India (1900–pres.); Bangladesh (1984–pres.)

Pakistan competed at the 1952 Summer Olympics in Helsinki, Finland. 38 competitors, all men, took part in 25 events in 7 sports.

== Results by event ==
Source:

== Athletics ==
Men's 100 metres

- Mohammad Sharif Butt

- Heat 7 1st round; 11.0 (→ did not advance)

- Jemadar Mohammad Aslam

- Heat 9 1st round; 10.9 (→ advanced to second round)
- Heat 1 2nd round; 10.9 (→ did not advance)

- Abdul Aziz

- Heat 11 1st round; 11.2 (→ did not advance)

Men's 200 metres

- Abdul Aziz

- Heat 8 1st round; 22.7 (→ did not advance)

- Jemadar Mohammad Aslam

- Heat 9 1st round; 22.2 (→ did not advance)

- Mohammad Sharif Butt

- Heat 11 1st round; 22.3 (→ did not advance)

Men's 400 metres

- Abdul Rehman

- Heat 1 1st round; 51.2 (→ did not advance)

- Aurang Zeb

- Heat 3 1st round; 51.0 (→ did not advance)

Men's 800 metres

- Alam Zeb

- Heat 3 1st round; 1:56.3 (→ did not advance)

Men's 10,000 metres

- Abdul Rashid

- 33.50.4 finished 30th out of 33

Men's marathon

- Havildar Mohammad Aslam

- 2.43:38.2 finished 38th out of 53

- Mohammad Benaras

- Interrupted, did not finish

Men's 400 metres hurdles

- Mohammad Shafi

- Heat 2 1st round; 56.1 (→ did not advance)

- Mirza Khan

- Heat 5 1st round; 56.3 (→ did not advance)

Men's 4×100 metres relay

- Mohammad Sharif Butt, Mohammad Fazil, Abdul Aziz and Jemadar Mohammad Aslam

- Heat 4 1st round; 42.8 (→ advanced to semifinals)
- Semifinals heat 1; 42.0 (→ did not advance)

Men's 4×400 metres relay

- Abdul Rehman, Mohammad Shafi, Mirza Khan and Aurang Zeb

- Heat 2 1st round; 3:23.2 (→ did not advance)

Men's throwing the javelin

- Jalal Khan

- Qualifying trials heat 1; 55.56m finished 12th out of 13

Men's throwing the hammer

- Fazal Hussain

- Qualifying trials heat 1; 48.36m finished 15th out of 16

- Mohammad Iqbal

- Qualifying trials heat 2; 47.45m finished 15th out of 16

Men's 10,000 metres walk

- Allah Ditta

- Heat 1 1st round; disqualified

== Boxing ==
Men's featherweight (57 kg)

- Sydney Greve

- 1st round; Beat A Leyes (ARG) KO 2nd rd
- 2nd round; Lost to J Ventaja (FRA) on pts 3:0

Men's lightweight (60 kg)

- Mohammad Ali

- 1st round; Bye
- 2nd round; Lost to V Marute (VEN) KO 1st rd

Men's welterweight (67 kg)

- Anwar Pasha Turki

- 1st round; Lost to H van der Linde (RSA) TKO 1st rd

Men's middleweight (75 kg)

- Khan Mohammad

- 1st round; Beat H Nowara (POL) on pts 2:1
- 2nd round; Lost to W Sentimenti (ITA) on pts 3:0

== Cycling ==
Men's 1,000 metres sprint scratch race

- Mohammad Naqi Malik

- Heat 5 1st round (→ entered repechage phase)
- Repechage heat 3 (→ did not qualify for quarter-finals) Placed 19th overall

Men's 1,000 metres time trial

- Imtiaz Bhatti

- 1:21.2 finished 25th out of 27

Men's team competition individual road race (190.4 km)

- Mohammad Naqi Malik and Imtiaz Bhatti

- Both broke off and did not finish

== Hockey ==
Men's Team Competition

- First round; Bye
- Second round; Defeated France (6-0)

- Semifinals

- Lost to Netherlands (0-1)

- Third Place Match

- Lost to Great Britain (1-2)

Pakistan finished 4th

Team Roster

- Mohammad Niaz Khan (captain)
- Abdul Aziz Malik (vice-captain)
- Fazalur Rehman (gk)
- Qazi Abdul Waheed (gk)
- Manzoor Hussain Atif
- Asghar Ali Khan
- Mohammad Rafiq
- Khawaja Mohammad Aslam
- Habib Ali Kiddie
- Jack Britto
- Safdar Ali Babul
- Abdul Latif Mir
- Mahmood-ul Hassan
- Syed Azmat Ali
- Abdul Hamid
- Abdul Qayyum Khan
- Habibur Rehman
- Latifur Rehman

Latifur Rehman had represented the gold medal-winning India men's hockey team at the 1948 Olympic Games in London, before migrating to Pakistan

== Shooting ==
One shooter represented Pakistan in 1952.

50 m rifle, prone

- Jan Azam

- Score 90/86/94/96=366 finished 8th out of 58

== Swimming ==
Men

Ranks given are within the heat.

Athlete	Event	Heat		Semifinal		Final	
Athlete	Event	Time	Rank	Time	Rank	Time	Rank
Muhammad Ramzan	400 m freestyle	5:45.7	7	Did not advance			
Muhammad Ramzan	1500 m freestyle	23:44.3	6	—N/a		Did not advance	
Muhammad Bashir	200 m breaststroke	3:01.3	8	Did not advance			

== Weightlifting ==
Men's middleweight (75 kg)

- Mohammad Iqbal Butt

- Press 95 kg
- Snatch 100 kg
- Jerk 130 kg
- Total 325 kg finished 17th out of 20
