= Israel at the 1954 Asian Games =

Israel's competition at the 1954 Asian Games

- IOC code: ISR
- NOC: Olympic Committee of Israel

in Manila
- Competitors: 3 in 3 sports
- Medals Ranked 7th: Gold 2 Silver 1 Bronze 1 Total 4

Asian Games appearances (overview)
- 1954; 1958; 1962; 1966; 1970; 1974

Israel participated in the 1954 Asian Games held in the city of Manila, Philippines from May 1, 1954 to May 9, 1954.

== Medals ==
Games	Gold	Silver	Bronze	Total
Athletics	1	0	0	1
Diving	1	1	0	2
Shooting	0	0	1	1
Totals (3 entries)	2	1	1	4

== Athletics ==
Athlete	Event	Final	
Athlete	Event	Result	Rank
Ahuva Kraus-Krivitzki	Women's high jump	1.553 m	1st place, gold medalist(s)

== Diving ==
Athlete	Event	Final	
Athlete	Event	Points	Rank
Yoav Ra'anan	Men's 3 m springboard	156.91	1st place, gold medalist(s)
Yoav Ra'anan	Men's 10 m platform	156.53	2nd place, silver medalist(s)

== Shooting ==
Athlete	Event	Final	
Athlete	Event	Points	Rank
Dov Ben-Dov	Men's 300 m free rifle	966	3rd place, bronze medalist(s)
Dov Ben-Dov	Men's smallbore rifle 3 positions	1094	4
