= Abdul Malik (athlete) =

Pakistani sprinter (born 1937)

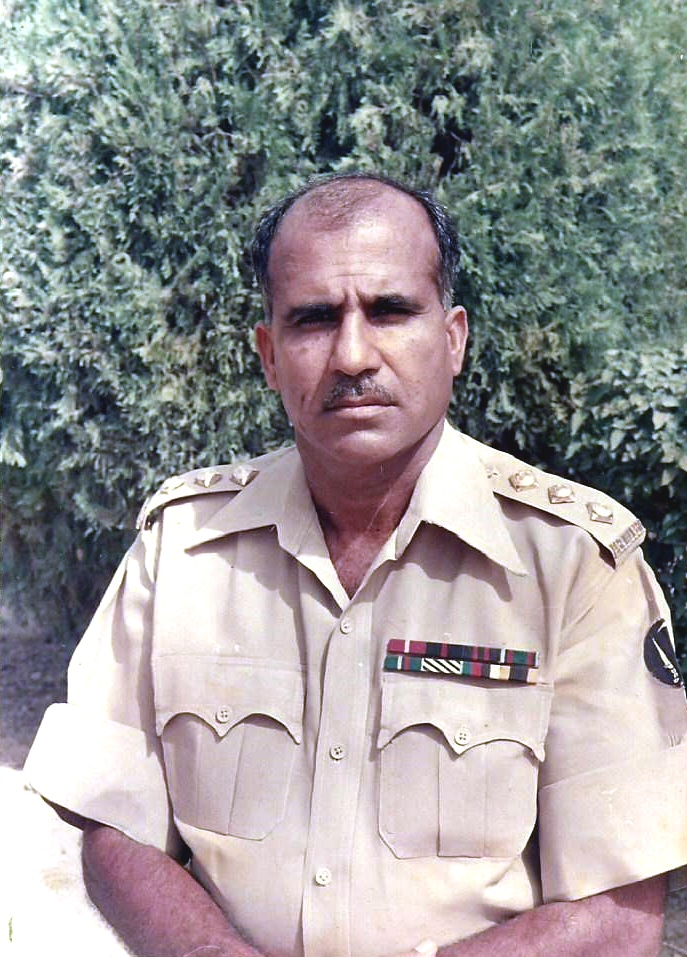

Personal information
- Full name: Abdul Majeed Malik
- Nationality: Pakistani
- Born: 29 April 1937 (age 89) Jand, Chakwal
- Education: Matriculate
- Occupations: Track and field athlete
- Years active: 1960-1972

Sport
- Country: Pakistan
- Sport: Athletics
- Events: 100m, 110m hurdles, 4 × 100 m relay
Medal record
Men's athletics
Representing Pakistan
National Games
Silver medal – second place	1960 Lahore	110 metres hurdles
Gold medal – first place	1960 Lahore	4 x 100 metres relay
Silver medal – second place	1965 Lahore	110 m hurdles
- Updated on 15 April 2014

Captain Abdul Malik
- Military career
- Allegiance: PAK
- Branch: Pakistan Army
- Rank: Captain
- Unit: Punjab Regiment
- Conflicts: 1965,1971

Abdul Majeed Malik (Urdu: عبدالمالک, born 29 April 1937) is a Pakistani sprinter who won two international and four national gold medals, three international and four national silver medals, and one international bronze medal for Pakistan. He competed in the 4 x 100 metres relay and 110m hurdles at the 1960 Summer Olympics. He also participated in the 1958 Asian Games.

His elder brother, Abdul Khaliq. known as the "Flying Bird of Asia," was a renowned coach for the Pakistan Army and achieved significant success, winning multiple gold medals in international competitions.

Abdul Majeed Malik was born in the small village of Jand in district Chakwal Punjab, Pakistan.

== Medals (international) ==
Sr. No.	Year	Venue	Country	Event	Medal	Time
Represented Pakistan
1	1960	London	London	110m Hurdles	Silver	

== See also ==
- List of Pakistani records in athletics
- Athletics in Pakistan
- Pakistan at the Olympics
