= Abdul Khaliq (athlete) =

Pakistani athlete (1933–1988)

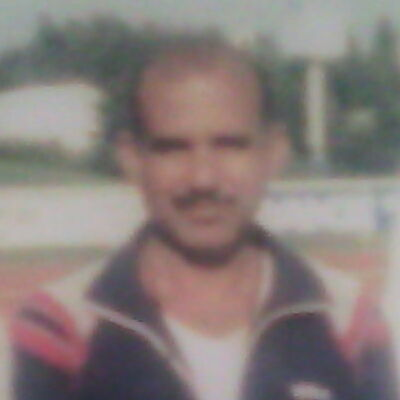
- Khaliq in 1987

Personal information
- Nickname: The Flying Bird of Asia
- Born: 23 March 1933 Jand, Chakwal, Punjab, British India (present-day Punjab, Pakistan)
- Died: 10 March 1988 (aged 54) Rawalpindi, Punjab, Pakistan

Sport
- Country: Pakistan
- Sport: Track and field
- Events: 100m, 200m, 4*100m, 100y, 110y, 200y, 220y
Medal record
Men's Athletics
Representing Pakistan
Asian Games
Gold medal – first place	1954 Manila	100m
Silver medal – second place	1954 Manila	4 x 100 m relay
Gold medal – first place	1958 Tokyo	100m
Silver medal – second place	1958 Tokyo	200m
Bronze medal – third place	1958 Tokyo	4 x 100 m relay
- Military career
- Allegiance: Pakistan
- Service years: 1948–1978
- Conflicts: Indo-Pakistani War of 1965; Indo-Pakistani War of 1971
- Awards: Pride of Performance

Subedar Abdul Khaliq (Punjabi, Urdu: عبد الخالق; 23 March 1933 – 10 March 1988), also known by his nickname Parinda-e-Asia پرندہ ایشیاء (Urdu for The Flying Bird of Asia), was a Pakistani sprinter. He won 36 international gold medals, 15 international silver medals, and 12 international bronze medals while representing Pakistan, including as a military officer for the 8th Medium Artillery Regiment at military games.

He represented Pakistan in the 100m, 200m, and 4 × 100m relay at the 1956 and 1960 Summer Olympics, the 1954 and 1958 Asian Games, and the 1954 and 1958 Commonwealth Games.

== Early life ==
Khaliq was born on 23 March 1933, in Jand, in the Chakwal district of Punjab province, British India to an Awan family. He developed an interest in Kabaddi, and during one of his matches, his performance caught the attention of Brigadier Rodham, the head of the Pakistan Army Sports Control Board, who subsequently recruited Khaliq to join the Army's Boys Company.

== International career ==
=== 1954 ===
==== Asian Games ====
In the 1954 Asian Games, Abdul Khaliq set a new Asian Games record of 100 meters in 10.6 seconds by beating the previous record of 10.8 seconds, held by Lavy Pinto of India in 1951, and was dubbed the Fastest Man of Asia. Abdul Khaliq won gold and silver medals in 100-meter and 4 × 100 m relay races, respectively, in the 1954 Asian Games. The Indian Prime Minister at the time, Jawaharlal Nehru, who was reportedly captivated by his performance during the event and chief guest, dubbed him "The Flying Bird of Asia".

==== Commonwealth and British Empire Games ====
Abdul Khaliq was a 100-yard semi-finalist and a 4×110-yard finalist in the 1954 Commonwealth and British Games.

=== 1955 ===
In 1955, Abdul Khaliq took part in the World Military Games held in Athens, Greece.

=== 1956 ===
==== Indo-Pak Meet at Delhi ====
At the first Indo-Pak Athletics meet in Delhi in 1956, Abdul Khaliq set new Asian records in both the 100 and 200-meter events.

Abdul Khaliq won the 100-meter dash by defeating Indian athlete V.K. Rai, winning the gold medal with a time of 10.4 seconds. He also won the 200-meter race by defeating Lavy Pinto of India and set a new record by clocking in 21.4 seconds.

==== World Military Games at Berlin ====
At the 1956 World Military Games in Berlin, Abdul Khaliq won three bronze medals. He finished third in the final of the 100 meters with a time of 10.4 seconds, matching his Delhi time. His other two bronze medals came in the 200 m individual, and 4×100 meter relays.

==== Pakistan Athletics Training Program in England ====
During the Pakistan Athletics Training Program in England, Abdul Khaliq defeated Britain’s top sprinters, Shaton and Spooner, in both the 100-yard and 200-yard sprints. He won the 100-yard sprint in 10.1 seconds at an international meet during the Highland Games on a turf track made wet by heavy morning rain. In this event, he triumphed over athletes from 15 European countries.

==== Victorian Relay Championship ====
Abdul Khaliq ran a 100-meter race in 10.4 seconds, equaling the Australian National record at Olympic Park. Khaliq's time was only one-tenth of a second slower than Bobby Morrow's gold medal-winning time in the Olympic Games 100-meter final. He won the Gold medal in the 100 meters and the 4×100 yards.

==== Melbourne Olympics ====
In the 1956 Summer Olympics, Abdul Khaliq reached the semi-finals in both the 100-meter and 200-meter races at the Olympics. In the 200-meter semi-finals, he clocked a time of 21.1 seconds, securing 4th place. This performance placed him among the top seven athletes in the competition.

On 24 November 1956, the day of the semi-finals and finals of the 100-meter race, Abdul Khaliq ran as the anchor for Pakistan’s winning team in the 4×110-yard Victorian Relay Championship. He helped his team extend a 10-yard lead and finish in 41.6 seconds—just one-tenth of a second shy of the national record held by the Australian Olympic team.

Final Standings in Melbourne Olympics

Rank	Athlete	Team	Medal
1	Bobby Joe Morrow	United States	Gold
2	Thane Baker	United States	Silver
3	Hec Hogan	Australia	Bronze
4	Ira Murchison	United States	
5	Manfred Germar	Germany	
6	Mike Agostini	Trinidad and Tobago	
4 h1 r3/4	Abdul Khaliq	Pakistan	
4 h2 r3/4	Morrie Rae	New Zealand	
5 h1 r3/4	Stan Levenson	Canada	
5 h2 r3/4	Marian Foik	Poland	

=== 1957 ===
In 1957, Abdul Khaliq won 11 international gold medals and 1 international silver medal by participating in multiple events held in England, Iran, Greece, and Scotland.

=== 1958 ===
==== Asian Games ====
Khaliq participated in the 1958 Asian Games. He defended his title in the 100-meter race by defeating Kyohei Ushio of Japan. Abdul Khaliq won 3 medals: gold in the 100 meter race, silver in the 200-meter race, and bronze in the 4 × 100 m relay race. With Khaliq's performance, Pakistan secured 2nd position in Athletics and 6th in the overall rankings.

==== Commonwealth Games ====
Abdul Khaliq also won 3 more medals in 1958 by taking part in different events held in Japan, China, and Scotland. He also participated in the 1958 Commonwealth Games held in Cardiff and was a semi-finalist in 100 yards, clocking 9.8 seconds.

=== 1959 ===
In 1959, Abdul Khaliq participated in many countries, including the United Kingdom, Sweden and Ireland. He won 9 international gold medals, 7 international silver medal, and 4 international bronze medals through several events.

=== 1960 ===
==== Olympic Games ====
Abdul Khaliq took part in the 1960 Olympic Games held in Rome but he did not qualify for the next rounds in both 100 meters and 4 × 100 meters relay race events.

==== International Meet at Lahore ====
In this event, Khaliq won a gold medal in the 100-meter race with a time of 10.4 seconds, a bronze medal in the 200-meter race, and another gold medal in the 4 x 100-meter relay race, clocking 41.5 seconds. This event was depicted in the Indian movie Bhaag Milkha Bhaag.

== Coaching career ==
Following his retirement, Khaliq started his coaching career with Army, where he coached in 1965, 1966, 1967, 1970 and 1971. He coached Punjab in 1974 and 1975, before becoming the national coach from 1974 to 1978.

== Personal life and death ==
Coming from a family of athletes, Khaliq's younger brother Abdul Malik also was an athlete. Khaliq was held as a prisoner of war in India after the 1971 war. In recognition of his athletic achievements, the Indian government offered to release him but Khaliq turned down the offer, refusing any preferential treatment.

Khaliq had four sons. The eldest Ghulam Abbas and his younger brother Mohammad Ashfaq also served in the Pakistan Army. Mohammad Ashfaq died when the tractor he was driving overturned near his village. The third son, Mohammad Ejaz was a coach of athletics in Pakistan Sports Board while the youngest son, Abdul Razzaq, was an instructor of physical education in the village school.

Khaliq died on March 10, 1988 in Rawalpindi.

== Legacy ==
Khaliq is widely considered one of Pakistan's greatest athletes and a key figure in the Golden Age of Pakistani athletics during the 1950s and 1960s. A biopic about his life has been in development starring actor Hamza Ali Abbasi. His legendary rivalry with Indian sprinter Milkha Singh, particularly at the 1960 Lahore Meet, was previously depicted in the 2013 Bollywood film Bhaag Milkha Bhaag, where Indian actor Dev Gill portrayed Khaliq. The Flying Bird of Asia, a short film directed by Muhammad Haris (oyyeharry) paying tribute to sprint legend was released on YouTube on 25 October 2026.

== Achievements ==
International Medals (numbers as per events)

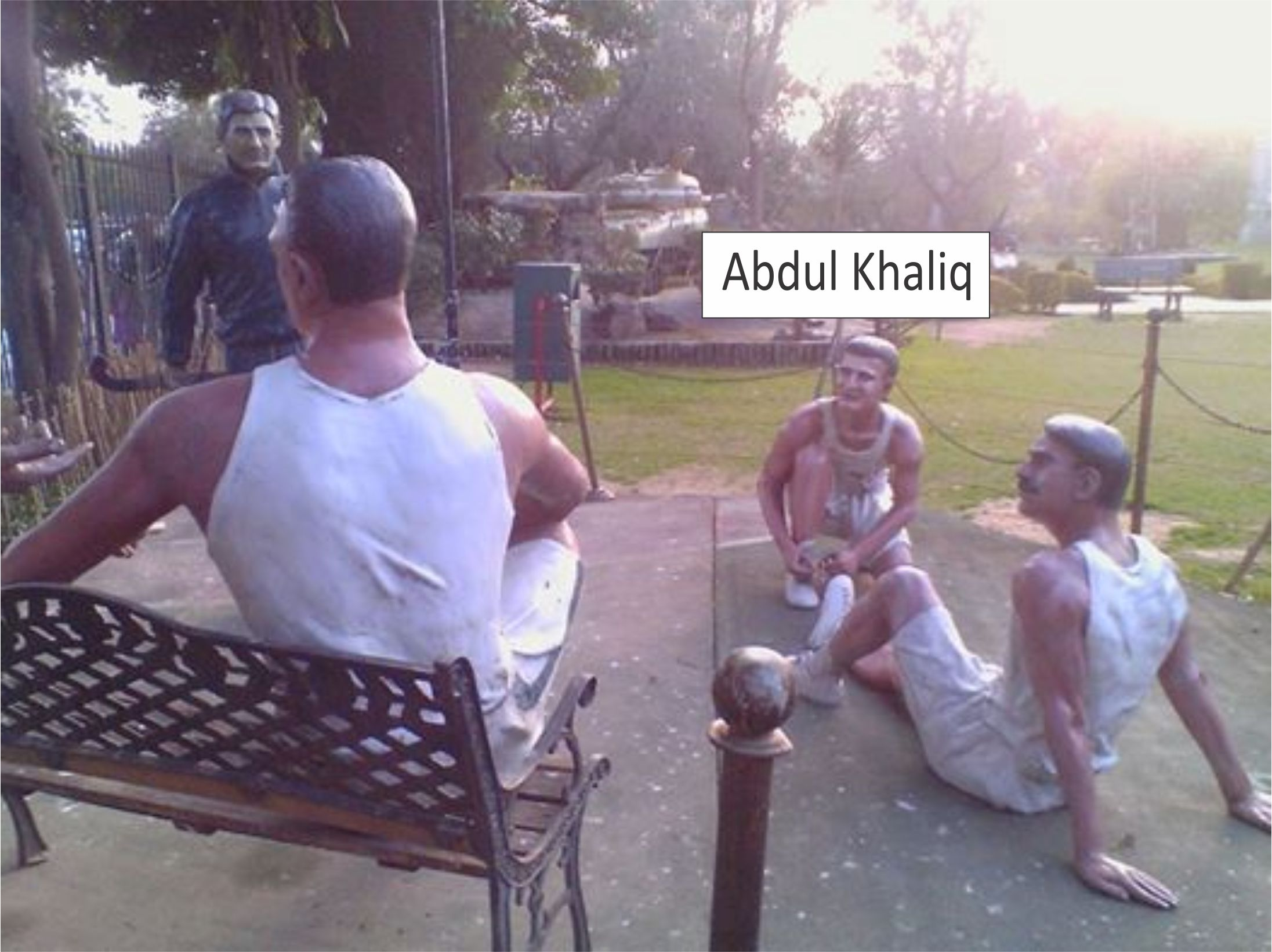
Khaliq's statue in Ayub Park Rawalpindi, Pakistan

Event	Gold	Silver	Bronze
100 y	09	0	02
120 y	02	0	0
100 m	13	08	04
220 y	02	01	01
200 m	07	04	04
4*110 y	01	0	0
4*100 m	02	02	01
Total	36	15	12

Presidential Award

Ribbon	Decoration	Country	Year
	Pride of Performance	Pakistan	1958

Khaliq was given the Presidential Award Pride of Performance in 1958 by the President of Pakistan Ayub Khan in recognition of his outstanding achievements and contribution to athletics.

== Medals (international) ==
Sr. No.	Year	Venue	Country	Competitions	Event	Medal	Time
Represented Pakistan
1	1954	Manila	Philippines	2nd Asian Games	100m	Gold	10.6sec (New Asian Record)
2	1954	Manila	Philippines	2nd Asian Games	4*100m	Silver	41.5 sec
3	1954	Madawala	England	Triangular Meet	100m	Gold
4	1956	Delhi	India	Pakistan vs India	100m	Gold	10.4sec (New Asian Record) (New Pakistan Record)
5	1956	Delhi	India	Pakistan vs India	200m	Gold	21.4sec (New Asian record) (New Pakistan Record)
6	1956	Delhi	India	Pakistan vs India	4*100m	Silver
7	1956	Berlin	Germany	International Military; Track and Field Championship	100m	Bronze	10.4sec
8	1956	Berlin	Germany	International Military; Track and Field Championship	200m	Bronze	21.4/10sec
9	1956	England	England	Pakistan Athletics; Training Programme	100y	Gold	10.1sec
10	1956	London	England	England National Competitions	100m	Silver
11	1956	Edinburgh	Scotland	Highland Games	100y	Gold
12	1956	Kelang	Australia	International Meet Australia	200m	Silver
13	1956	Victoria	Australia	Victorian Relay Championship	100m	Gold	10.4 sec
14	1956	Victoria	Australia	Victorian Relay Championship	4* 100m	Gold	41.6 sec
15	1956	Bendigo	Australia	International Meet Australia	100m	Bronze
16	1956	England	England	Victorian Open Competitions	100m	Gold
17	1957	White City	England	London vs New York	100y	Gold
18	1957	White City	England	London vs New York	100m	Gold	10.6sec
19	1957	Glasgow	England	Rangers Meet	120y	Gold	11.6sec
20	1957	Glasgow	England	Rangers Meet	220y	Gold	21.8sec
21	1957	Manchester	England	International Competitions	100y	Gold	9.6sec
22	1957	Manchester	England	Open Meet	100y	Gold
23	1957	Dublin	Ireland	Irish International Meet	100y	Gold
24	1957	Tehran	Iran	Pak Iran Competitions	100m	Gold	10.8sec
25	1957	Tehran	Iran	Pak Iran Competitions	200m	Gold	22sec
26	1957	Tehran	Iran	Pak Iran Competitions	4*100m	Gold	40.8sec
27	1957	Athens	Greece	World Military Meet Athens	100m	Silver
28	1957	Edinburgh	Scotland	Highland Games	100y	Gold	9.9sec
29	1958	Tokyo	Japan	Japan International	100m	Silver
30	1958	Hong Kong	China	International Meet	100m	Gold
31	1958	Tokyo	Japan	3rd Asian Games	100m	Gold	10.9sec
32	1958	Tokyo	Japan	3rd Asian Games	200m	Silver	21.7sec
33	1958	Tokyo	Japan	3rd Asian Games	4*100m	Bronze	41.5
34	1958	Edinburgh	Scotland	Dual Empire Games	100y	Bronze	9.9sec
35	1959	Bradford	England	International Meet England	100y	Gold	10.1sec
36	1959	Bradford	England	International Meet England	220y	Silver
37	1959	Bright Hill	England	International Meet England	100y	Gold
38	1959	Dublin	Ireland	Irish International Meet	100m	Gold
39	1959	Dublin	Ireland	Irish International Meet	200m	Gold
40	1959	Cardiff	Wales	Wales International	100m	Gold
41	1959	Cardiff	Wales	Wales International	200m	Gold
42	1959	Glasgow	Scotland	International Meet	120y	Gold	11.6sec
43	1959	Malmö	Sweden	International Meet	100m	Silver
44	1959	Malmö	Sweden	International Meet	200m	Silver
45	1959	Gävle	Sweden	International Meet	200m	Silver	21.9sec
46	1959	Stockholm	Sweden	International Meet	100m	Silver	10.7sec
47	1959	Stockholm	Sweden	International Meet	200m	Bronze	21.6sec
48	1959	Borås	Sweden	International Meet	200m	Gold
49	1959	Gothenburg	Sweden	International Meet	100m	Silver	21.8sec
50	1959	Edinburgh	Scotland	Highland Games	100m	Silver
51	1959	Dublin	Ireland	International Track and Field Meet	220y	Gold	22.2sec
52	1959	Cardiff	Wales	International Dual Meet	100y	Bronze	10sec
53	1959	Cardiff	Wales	International Dual Meet	220y	Bronze
54	1959	Malmö	Sweden	International Meet	100m	Bronze	10.6sec
55	1960	Lahore	Pakistan	First youth Festival and Triangular International Meet	100m	Gold	10.4sec
56	1960	Lahore	Pakistan	First youth Festival and Triangular International Meet	200m	Bronze
57	1960	Lahore	Pakistan	First youth Festival and Triangular International Meet	4*100m	Gold	41.5sec
58	1960	Medawala	England	International Games	200m	Gold
59	1960	Cairo	Egypt	Egypt International Games	100m	Gold
60	1960	Cairo	Egypt	Egypt International Games	200m	Gold
61	1962	's-Hertogenbosch	Netherlands	World Military Games	100m	Bronze
62	1962	Ipoh	Malaysia	International Meet	100m	Silver
63	1962	Ipoh	Malaysia	International Meet	200m	Bronze	22.1sec

== Running statistics ==
Event	Year	Venue	Time
100y	1957	Manchester (United Kingdom)	9.6
100y	1957	Edinburgh (United Kingdom)	9.9
100y	1958	Edinburgh (United Kingdom)	9.9
100m	1959	Rawalpindi (Pakistan)	10.2
100m	1956	Abbottabad (Pakistan)	10.2
100m	1957	Sialkot (Pakistan)	10.3
100m	1954	Delhi (India)	10.4
100m	1956	Berlin (Germany)	10.4
100m	1960	Lahore (Pakistan)	10.4
100m	1956	Manila (Philippines)	10.6
100m	1957	White city (United Kingdom)	10.6
100m	1958	Tokyo (Japan)	10.6
100m	1957	Tehran (Iran)	10.8
120y	1957	Glasgow (United Kingdom)	11.6
120y	1959	Glasgow (United Kingdom)	11.6
200m	1956	Abbottabad (Pakistan)	20.8
200m	1956	Melbourne (Australia)	21.1
200m	1954	Delhi (India)	21.4
200m	1959	Stockholm (Sweden)	21.6
200m	1956	Berlin (Germany)	21.4
220y	1958	London (United Kingdom)	21.5
220y	1958	Glasgow (United Kingdom)	21.8

== See also ==
- List of Pakistani records in athletics
- Athletics in Pakistan
- Pakistan at the Olympics
