= Diving at the 1954 Asian Games =

- Dates: 5–8 May 1954

Diving was contested at the 1954 Asian Games in Manila, Philippines from May 5 to May 8, 1954.

== Medalists ==
=== Men ===
Event	Gold	Silver	Bronze
3 m springboard	Yoav Ra'anan; Israel	Katsuichi Mori; Japan	Yutaka Baba; Japan
10 m platform	Katsuichi Mori; Japan	Yoav Ra'anan; Israel	K. P. Thakkar; India

=== Women ===
Event	Gold	Silver	Bronze
3 m springboard	Masami Miyamoto; Japan	Shuko Sakaguchi; Japan	Kanoko Tsutani; Japan
10 m platform	Masami Miyamoto; Japan	Shuko Sakaguchi; Japan	Kanoko Tsutani; Japan

== Medal table ==
Rank	Nation	Gold	Silver	Bronze	Total
1	Japan (JPN)	3	3	3	9
2	Israel (ISR)	1	1	0	2
3	India (IND)	0	0	1	1
Totals (3 entries)		4	4	4	12
