= Israel at the 1956 Summer Olympics =

- IOC code: ISR
- NOC: Olympic Committee of Israel

in Melbourne/Stockholm
- Competitors: 3 in 3 sports
- Flag bearer: Yoav Ra'anan
- Medals: Gold 0 Silver 0 Bronze 0 Total 0

Summer Olympics appearances (overview)
- 1952; 1956; 1960; 1964; 1968; 1972; 1976; 1980; 1984; 1988; 1992; 1996; 2000; 2004; 2008; 2012; 2016; 2020; 2024

Israel competed at the 1956 Summer Olympics in Melbourne, Australia. As a partial support to the Dutch-led boycott, Israeli athletes under the Olympic flag instead of the national flag.

== Results by event ==
=== Athletics ===
| Event | Participant | Result | Ref |
|---|---|---|---|
| Men's long jump | David Kushnir | Qualifying - 6.89 metres (place 25) | |

=== Diving ===
| Event | Participant | Result | Ref |
|---|---|---|---|
| Men's 3m springboard | Yoav Raanan | 22nd place | |

=== Swimming ===
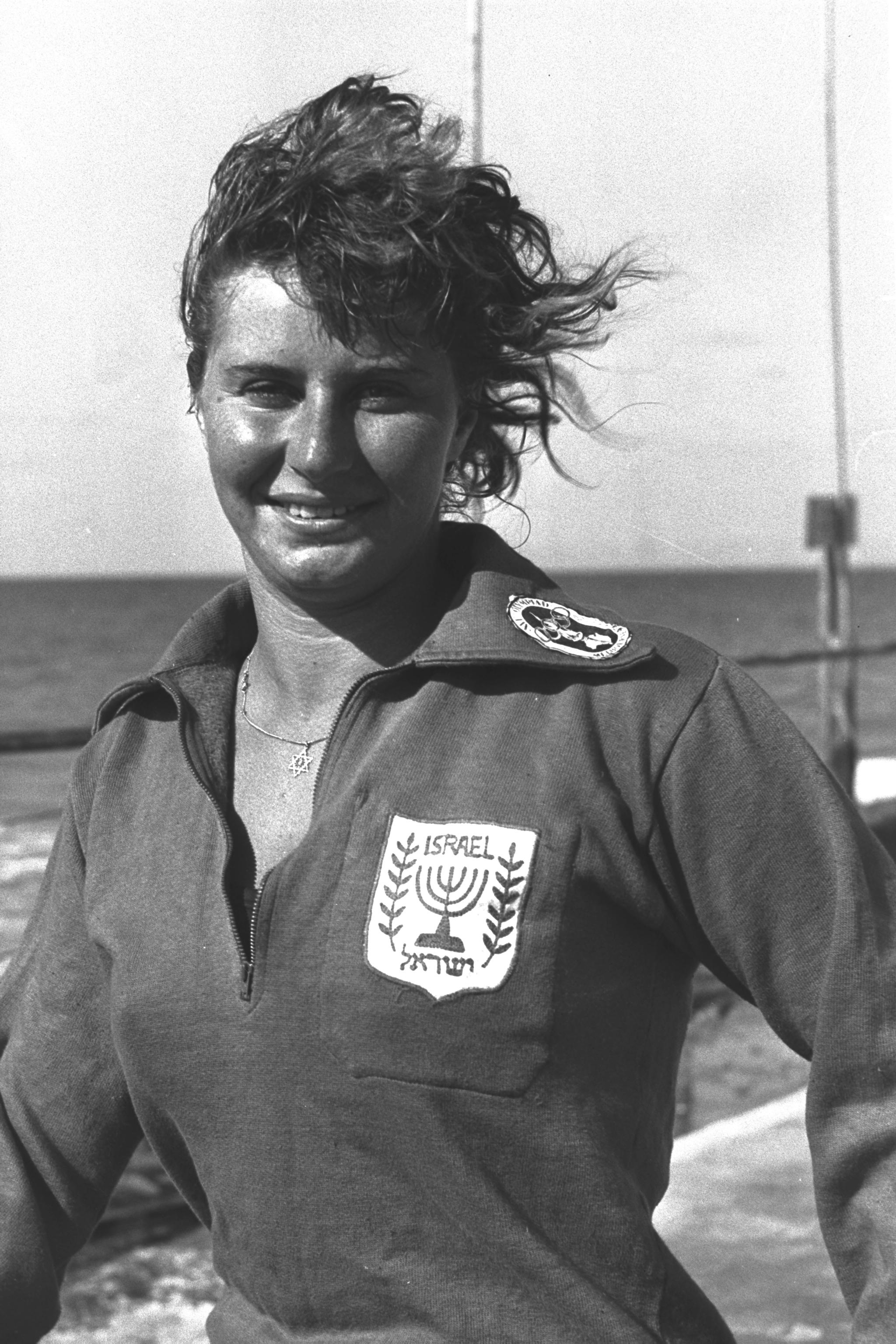
Shoshana Ribner

| Event | Participant | Result | Ref |
|---|---|---|---|
| Women's 100 metres freestyle | Shoshana Ribner | First round, - 1:10.4 | |
