= Yoav Ra'anan =

Israeli diver (1928–2022)

Personal information
- Native name: יואב רענן
- Born: 15 January 1928 Cairo, Kingdom of Egypt
- Died: 9 November 2022 (aged 94)

Sport
- Sport: Diving
Medal record
Representing Israel
Asian Games
Gold medal – first place	1954 Manila	3m springboard
Silver medal – second place	1954 Manila	10m platform

Yoav Ra'anan (Hebrew: יואב רענן; 15 January 1928 – 9 November 2022) was an Israeli Olympic diver. He was born in Cairo, Egypt. Ra’anan died on 9 November 2022, at the age of 94.

== Diving career ==
Ra'anan competed for Israel at the 1952 Summer Olympics, at the age of 24, in Helsinki, coming in 9th in Men's Springboard and 24th in Men's Platform. It was Israel's first appearance in the Olympic Games. He won a gold medal in high diving at the 1953 Maccabiah Games.

Ra'anan participated for Israel at the 1954 Asian Games in Manila, Philippines, in diving, winning the gold medal in 3 m springboard and the silver medal in 10 m platform. He competed again for Israel at the 1956 Summer Olympics, at the age of 28, in Melbourne, coming in 22nd in Men's Springboard. Ra'anan was one of only three competitors representing Israel in those Games, as they took place weeks after the Sinai War.
