= Choi Chung-sik =

South Korean long-distance runner

Choi Chung-Sik
Personal information
- Nationality: South Korean
- Born: 19 September 1931 Korea under Japanese rule
- Died: 24 June 2012 (aged 80) Seoul, South Korea

Sport
- Country: South Korea
- Sport: Athletics
- Event: long-distance track
Medal record
Men's athletics
Representing South Korea
Asian Games
| Gold medal – first place | 1954 Manila | 10,000 m |

Choi Chung-Sik (Korean: 최충식, 19 September 1931 – 24 June 2012) is a Korean former long-distance runner who competed in the 1952 Summer Olympics and in the 1956 Summer Olympics.
