= Choi Yoon-chil =

South Korean long-distance runner (1928–2020)

Personal information
- Born: 19 July 1928 Dancheon, Korea, Empire of Japan
- Died: October 8, 2020 (aged 92)

Sport
- Country: South Korea
- Sport: running
- Event: marathon

Korean name
- Hangul: 최윤칠
- Hanja: 崔崙七
- RR: Choe Yunchil
- MR: Ch'oe Yunch'il

Achievements and titles
- Olympic finals: 1948 (DNF), 1952(4th)
- National finals: Two-time champion
Medal record
Men's athletics
Asian Games
Gold medal – first place	1954 Manila	Men's 1500 m
Silver medal – second place	1954 Manila	Men's 5000 m

Choi Yoon-chil (19 July 1928 – 8 October 2020) was a South Korean long-distance runner who was a two-time Olympian and a two-time national champion in the marathon.

== Career ==
Choi led the marathon at the 1948 Summer Olympics in London before dropping out with less than 5 kilometers left in the race. He finished third in the 1950 Boston Marathon, but the Boston Athletic Association denied his entry into the following year's event because of the Korean War. BAA President Walter A. Brown stated: "While American soldiers are fighting and dying in Korea, every Korean should be fighting to protect his country instead of training for marathons. As long as the war continues there, we positively will not accept Korean entries for our race on April 19." In 1952, Choi finished fourth in the Olympic marathon at Helsinki.
