= Shazia Hidayat =

Pakistani track and field athlete

- Born: 4 April 1976 (age 50); Chichawatni, Punjab, Pakistan
- Citizenship: Canadian
- Education: University of Saskatchewan
- Occupation: Athlete
- Known for: The second woman ever to represent Pakistan at an Olympics

Shazia Hidayat (born 4 April 1976) is a Pakistani-Canadian former track and field athlete. She was the only female athlete in the Pakistan team competing in the Women's 1500 metres event at the 2000 Summer Olympics in Sydney, Australia. Her personal best for the 1500 metres is 4:58.79 minutes. She became only the second woman ever to represent Pakistan at an Olympic event after Shabana Akhtar, at the 1996 Olympics. She won a bronze medal in the 4 × 100 m relay event at the 1998 South Asian Championships in Colombo.

== Life ==
Born in Chichawatni, Punjab, she grew up in the village 49/12 L (Subhanpur) 360 kilometers south of Islamabad. She started running at the age of 14.

Hidayat had to overcome huge obstacles to compete internationally. The main objection raised was that how could a Pakistani woman race in a track and field competition in which other women do not wear clothes that cover their bodies. Her parents, especially her father, encouraged her to run, but her training was done at 2:30 in the morning with a brother biking to pace her, because female athletes were not allowed to run on the road. She realized that if she qualified, she would have to wear a jogging suit while others wore shorts, in view of sensitivities dictated by custom.

While running qualifying races in the daytime in her home country, spectators threw rocks and tomatoes at her.

In 2005, Hidayet ran the Lahore Marathon alongside several other female runners.

In 2008, after running a marathon in Toronto, Hidayat claimed refugee status in Canada due to safety concerns in Pakistan. She moved to Saskatoon in 2010. In 2011, Hidayat competed in the Knights of Columbus Indoor Games in Saskatoon.

By 2016, she worked at the University of Saskatchewan, took classes to further improve her English, and trained in the afternoons. She hoped to coach other female runners in the future. She was naturalized as a Canadian citizen in 2016. In December of that year, her family also immigrated to Canada.
