= Shoshana Ribner =

Israeli swimmer

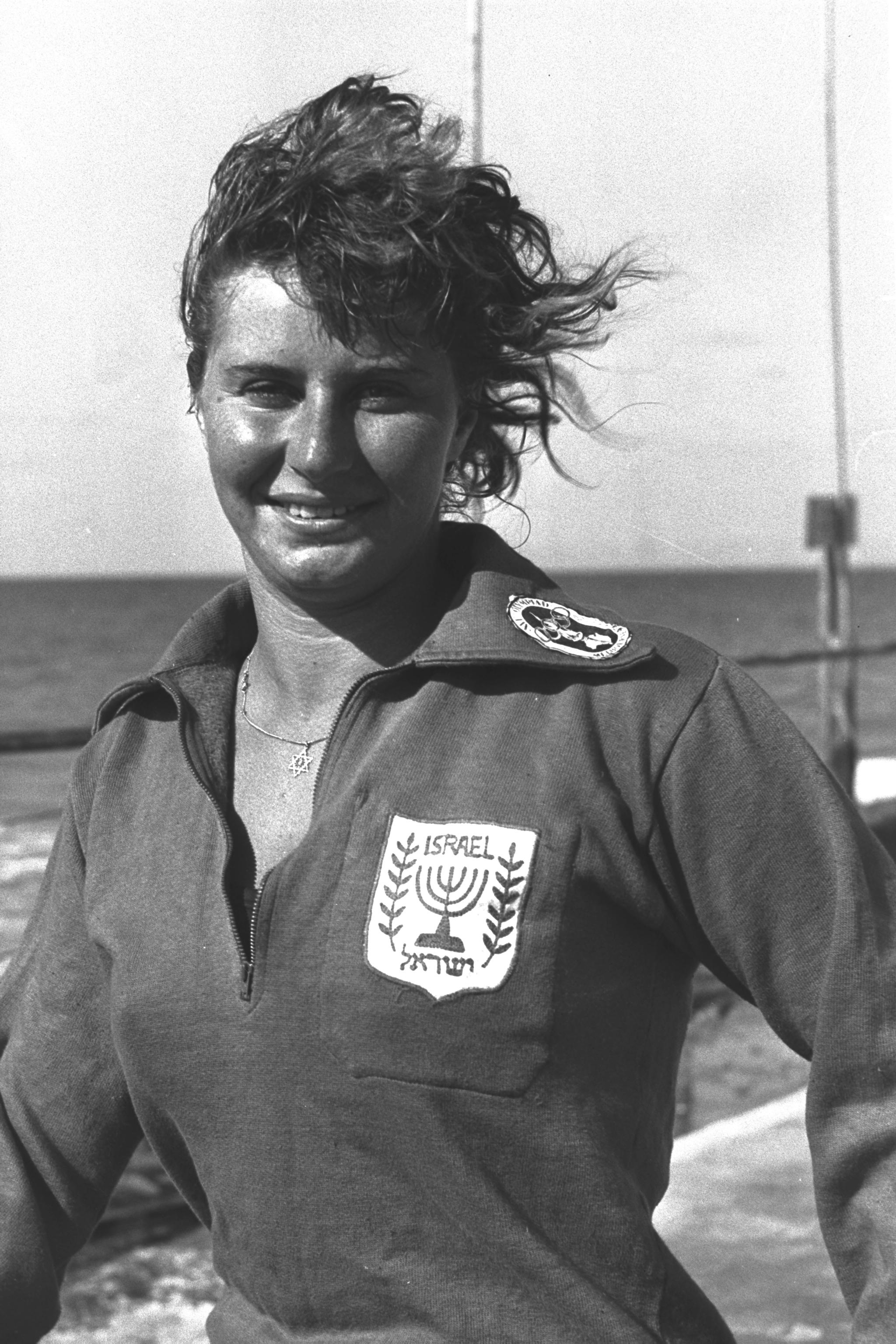
- Ribner, member of the Israeli swim team (1957)

Personal information
- National team: Israel
- Born: שושנה ריבנר; February 20, 1938 Vienna, Federal State of Austria
- Died: 29 June 2007 (age 69)

Sport
- Sport: Swimming
- Club: Brit Maccabi Atid

Shoshana Ribner (also "Rivner", Hebrew: שושנה ריבנר; February 20, 1938 – 29 June 2007) was an Israeli Olympic swimmer.

== Biography ==
Shoshana Ribner was born in Vienna, Austria. Her family immigrated to Israel when she was an infant. Ribner began competing as a swimmer at the age of 13. Her trainer, 24-year-old Nachum Buch, swam for Israel at the 1952 Summer Olympics.

Ribner's son, Damon Fialkov, was Israel's 200-meter backstroke champion in 1981.

== Swimming career ==
Ribner joined the Brit Maccabi Atid swimming club of Tel Aviv at the age of 13. She won gold medals in the 100-meter and 400-meter crawls at the 1953 Maccabiah Games.

She competed for Israel at the 1956 Summer Olympics, when she was 18 years old, in Melbourne, Australia, in Swimming--Women's 100 metre freestyle. She finished 7th in her heat, with a time of 1:10.3, and did not advance to the finals. She was the only female on Israel's 15-person Olympic team. Her best time in the 100 meter freestyle was 1:09.3, and her fastest time for the 400 meter freestyle was 5:42.59, as of 1956. That year she was named Israel's Athlete of the Year.

Ribner won two gold medals and two silver medals (including a silver medal in the 400 m) at the 1957 Maccabiah Games.

In 1998, she was named one of Israel's top 50 athletes in its history.
