= Muhammad Ramzan Ali =

Pakistani former athlete

Personal information
- Nationality: Pakistani
- Born: Muhammad Ramzan Ali; 13 December 1932 Ludhiana, Punjab, India
- Height: 1.72 m (5 ft 7 1/2 in)
- Weight: 73 kg (161 lb)

Sport
- Country: Pakistan
- Sport: Athletics
Medal record
Men's Athletics
Event	1st	2nd	3rd
Asian Games	–	–	2
Commonwealth Games	–	–	1
Total	0	0	3
Asian Games
Bronze medal – third place	1958 Tokyo	4 × 100m relay
Bronze medal – third place	1958 Tokyo	Long jump
Commonwealth Games
Bronze medal – third place	1958 Cardiff	Long jump

Muhammad Ramzan Ali (born 13 December 1932) is a Pakistani athlete who competed at the 1956 Melbourne Olympics and 1960 Rome Olympics.

== Career ==
Ali represented Pakistan in both the long and triple jumps at the 1956 Summer Olympics.

At the 1958 Asian Games, he won bronze medals in the 4 x 100 metres relay and long jump. He also won a bronze medal in the long jump at the 1958 British Commonwealth Games in Cardiff.

At the 1960 Summer Olympics, Ali again represented Pakistan in the long jump and was also a member of their 4x 100 metres relay team.

His personal best in the long jump, 7.43m, was set in 1960.

== Personal life ==
Like many of the early competitors in Pakistani athletics, Ramzan served in the Pakistan Army.

== See also ==
- List of Pakistani records in athletics
- Athletics in Pakistan
- Pakistan at the Olympics
