= Ahuva Kraus =

Israeli track & field athlete and basketball player

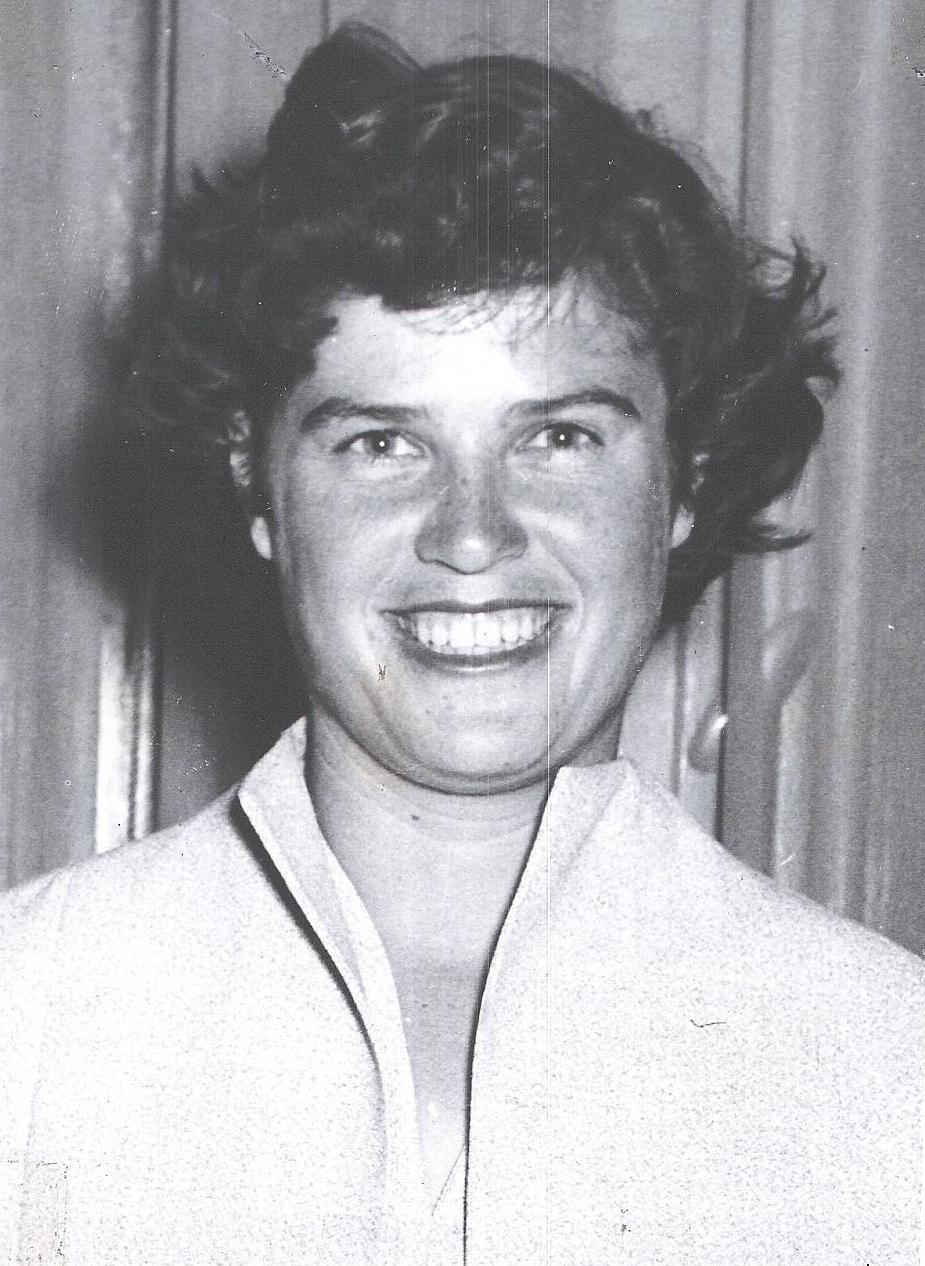
- Kraus in 1954

Personal information
- Native name: אהובה קראוס
- Nationality: Israeli
- Born: 1932 Rehovot
- Died: 2009 (aged 76–77)

Sport
- Country: Israel
- Sport: Athletics
Medal record
Women's athletics
Representing Israel
Asian Games
Gold medal – first place	1954 Manila	High jump

Ahuva Kraus-Kravitzky (Hebrew: אהובה קראוס-קרביצקי; 1932–2009) was an Israeli female track and field athlete and basketball player. She won a gold medal in the high jump at the 1954 Asian Games. She won with an Asian record mark of 1.55 m (5 ft 1 in).

Born in Rehovot, she joined the local Hapoel sports club. She rose to the forefront of the national scene with an Israeli high jump record of 1.48 m (4 ft 10 1/4 in) in 1950. She won gold medals in that event at the Maccabiah Games in 1950 and 1953, as well as the title at the 1956 Hapoel Games. She led her club's basketball section to a national championship and cup double in 1961.
