= Ajit Singh Balla =

Indian high jumper

Ajit Singh
Personal information
- Full name: Ajit Singh Bhullar
- Nationality: Indian
- Born: 5 November 1931 Patiala, British India

Sport
- Sport: Athletics
- Event: High jump
Medal record
Representing India
Men's athletics
Asian Games
Gold medal – first place	1954 Manila	Men's high jump

Ajit Singh Balla (born 5 November 1931) is an Indian high jumper who won a gold medal in the 1954 Asian Games. He competed in the 1954 British Empire and Commonwealth Games and 1956 Summer Olympics.
