= Katsuichi Mori =

Japanese diver

Personal information
- Nationality: Japanese
- Born: 26 December 1929
- Died: 2 September 2011 (aged 81) Santa Monica, California, U.S.

Sport
- Sport: Diving
Medal record
Representing Japan
Asian Games
Gold medal – first place	1954 Manila	10m platform
Silver medal – second place	1954 Manila	3m springboard

Katsuichi Mori (毛利勝一, Mōri Katsuichi; 26 December 1929 – 2 September 2011) was a Japanese diver. He competed in two events at the 1952 Summer Olympics.
