= Mirza Khan =

Pakistani hurdler (1924–2022)

Personal information
- Nationality: Pakistani
- Born: 15 December 1924
- Died: 26 January 2022 (aged 97)

Sport
- Country: Pakistan
- Sport: Athletics
- Event: Hurdling
Medal record
Men's athletics
Representing Pakistan
Asian Games
Gold medal – first place	1954 Manila	400 m hurdles

Mirza Khan (15 December 1924 – 26 January 2022) was a Pakistani hurdler who competed in the 1952 Summer Olympics. He won the gold medal in 400 m hurdles event at the 1954 Asian Games, setting the Games record at 54.1 seconds. He died on 25 January 2022, at the age of 97.

== See also ==
- List of Pakistani records in athletics
- Athletics in Pakistan
- Pakistan at the Olympics
