= Atsuko Nambu =

Japanese athlete

Personal information
- Nationality: Japanese

Sport
- Country: Japan
- Sport: Athletics
Medal record
Women's athletics
Representing Japan
Asian Games
Gold medal – first place	1954 Manila	100 m
Silver medal – second place	1954 Manila	200 m
Silver medal – second place	1954 Manila	4×100 m
Silver medal – second place	1954 Manila	Long jump

Atsuko Nambu is a Japanese athlete. She won a gold medal in the individual 100 metres and silver medals in the 4 × 100 m relay, individual 200 metres and long jump in the 1954 Asian Games. Her deportment at the Asian Games helped to prevent disruption by Filipino spectators still seething from the brutal massacre by Japanese military forces in Manila during the last days of the occupation of the Philippines just nine years before. For her action, she was dubbed by Filipinos “sweetheart of the Games”.
