= Joginder Singh Dhanaor =

Indian athlete

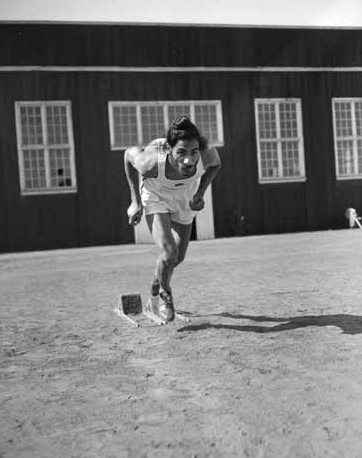
- Joginder Singh Dhanaor at the 1954 British Empire and Commonwealth Games; Attribution:Province newspaper

Personal information
- Nationality: Indian

Sport
- Country: India
- Sport: Athletics
Medal record
Men's athletics
Representing India
Asian Games
| Silver medal – second place | 1954 Manila | 400 m |
| Silver medal – second place | 1954 Manila | 4 × 400 m |

Joginder Singh Dhanaor is an Indian athlete. He won a silver medal in the 400 metres and the 4 × 400 m relay in the 1954 Asian Games.

He competed in the men's 440 yards competition at the 1954 British Empire and Commonwealth Games in Vancouver, Canada.
