= Athletics at the South Asian Games =

Athletics competitions have been held at the South Asian Games since the inaugural edition of the South Asian Federation Games in 1984 in Kathmandu, Nepal.

== South Asian Games ==
Games	Year	Host	Events	
Games	Year	Host	Men	Women
I	1984	Kathmandu		
II	1985	Dhaka		
III	1987	Calcutta		
IV	1989	Islamabad		
V	1991	Colombo		
VI	1993	Dhaka		
VII	1995	Madras		
VIII	1999	Kathmandu		
IX	2004	Islamabad	19	13
X	2006	Colombo	20	15
XI	2010	Dhaka	15	8
XII	2016	Guwahati	20	17
XIII	2019	Kathmandu	18	18
