= Midori Tanaka =

Japanese athlete

Personal information
- Nationality: Japanese

Sport
- Country: Japan
- Sport: Athletics
Medal record
Women's athletics
Representing Japan
Asian Games
Gold medal – first place	1954 Manila	200 m
Silver medal – second place	1954 Manila	4×100 m

Midori Tanaka is a Japanese athlete. She won a gold medal in the individual 200 metres and a silver medal in the 4 × 100 m relay in the 1954 Asian Games.
