= Muhammad Sharif Butt =

Pakistani sprinter (1926–2015)

Personal information
- Nationality: Pakistani
- Born: 15 January 1926
- Died: 8 June 2015 (aged 89)

Sport
- Country: Pakistan
- Sport: Athletics
- Event: Sprinting
Medal record
Men's athletics
Representing Pakistan
Asian Games
Gold medal – first place	1954 Manila	200 m
Silver medal – second place	1954 Manila	4 × 100 m relay
Bronze medal – third place	1958 Tokyo	4 × 100 m relay

Muhammad Sharif Butt (15 January 1926 – 8 June 2015) was a Pakistani sprinter who competed in the 1948, 1952, and 1956 Summer Olympics. He won the gold medal in the 200 m and silver medal in the 4 × 100 m relay events at the 1954 Asian Games. In the 4 x 100 m relay, they were second to a Japanese team which ran the race in 41.2, a then Games record, compared to the Pakistanis' time of 41.5 second. Butt also won the bronze medal in the 4 × 100 m relay event at the 1958 Asian Games.

== Competition record ==
Year	Competition	Venue	Position	Event	Notes
Representing Pakistan
1952	Olympics	Helsinki, Finland	3rd, Heat 7	100 m	11.17/11.0

== See also ==
- List of Pakistani records in athletics
- Athletics in Pakistan
- Pakistan at the Olympics
