= Sarwan Singh =

Indian hurdler

Personal information
- Full name: Sarwan Singh
- Nationality: Indian
- Born: Punjab, British India

Sport
- Country: India
- Sport: Track and field
- Event: 110 metres hurdles
Medal record
Representing India
Men's athletics
Asian Games
Gold medal – first place	1954 Manila	Men's 110 m hurdles

Sarwan Singh (born between 1927 and 1929) (Note: India Today, in its article mentions that he was 70 in 1999 and Hindustan Times, 85 in 2012) is a former Indian athlete who competed in the 110 metres hurdles. He won a gold medal at the 1954 Asian Games in Manila in the event. Forgotten for the rest of his life, he is said to have resorted to begging before receiving a pension of ₹1,500 (US$16).

Singh is also credited for having discovered the athlete Paan Singh Tomar, during his time as a Naik in the Bengal Engineer Group. Upon retiring from service in 1970, he drove taxi for nearly two decades.

== Achievements ==
Year	Competition	Venue	Position	Event	Notes
Representing India
1954	Asian Games	Manila, Philippines	1st	110 m hurdles	14.70
