= Masami Miyamoto =

Japanese diver (born 1934)

Personal information
- Native name: 宮本 まさみ
- Nationality: Japanese
- Born: 2 September 1934 (age 92)

Sport
- Sport: Diving
Medal record
Representing Japan
Asian Games
Gold medal – first place	1954 Manila	3m springboard
Gold medal – first place	1954 Manila	10m platform
Silver medal – second place	1958 Tokyo	10m platform

Masami Miyamoto (Japanese: 宮本 まさみ; born 2 September 1934) is a Japanese diver. She competed in two events at the 1952 Summer Olympics.
