= Tokusaburo Iwata =

Japanese sport shooter

Personal information
- Born: 18 February 1901

Sport
- Sport: Sports shooting

Tokusaburo Iwata (born 18 February 1901) was a Japanese sport shooter who competed in the 1956 Summer Olympics.
