= Ivan Jacob =

Indian sprinter 1925–2009

Ivan Herman Jacob
Personal information
- Nationality: Indian
- Born: 15 July 1925 Kollam, British India
- Died: 5 February 2009 (aged 83) Sydney, Australia

Sport
- Sport: Sprinting
- Event: 400 metres

Ivan Jacob (15 July 1925 – 5 February 2009) was an Indian sprinter. He competed in the men's 400 metres at the 1952 Summer Olympics. Jacob won a silver medal in the 4 x 400 metres relay at the 1954 Asian Games.
