= Yukiyoshi Aoki =

Japanese swimmer (1934–1996)

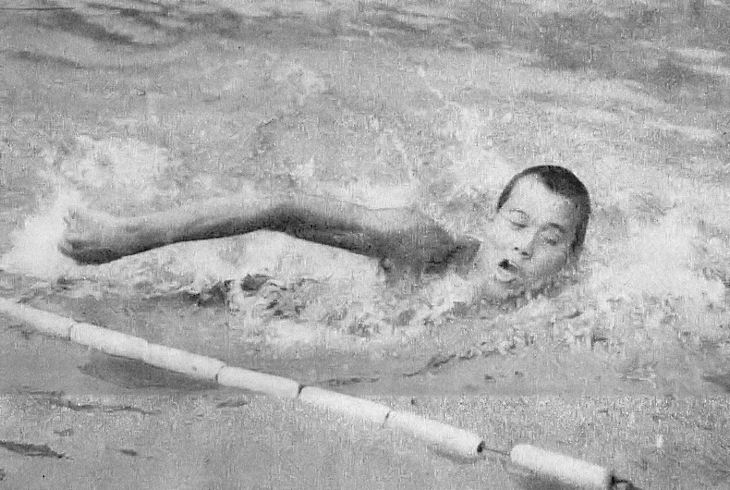

Personal information
- Born: September 15, 1934
- Died: April 19, 1996 (aged 61)

Sport
- Sport: Swimming
Medal record
Representing Japan
Asian Games
Gold medal – first place	1954 Manila	1500m freestyle
Gold medal – first place	1954 Manila	4x200m freestyle relay

Yukiyoshi Aoki (青木行義, Aoki Yukiyoshi; 15 September 1934 – 19 April 1996) was a Japanese Olympic freestyle swimmer who competed in the 1952 Summer Olympics and in the 1956 Summer Olympics.
