= Yoshio Kojima (hammer thrower) =

Japanese hammer thrower

Personal information
- Native name: 小島義雄
- Born: 7 August 1931
- Died: 3 March 1993 (aged 61) Kobe City, Japan

Sport
- Sport: Hammer throw

Yoshio Kojima (7 August 1931 – 3 March 1993) was a Japanese hammer thrower who competed in the 1956 Summer Olympics.

He also won the hammer throw at the Japan Championships in Athletics in 1953, 1954, 1955, and 1956.

He died in 1993 in Kobe at the age of 61. The cause of death was suicide.
