= Jand, Chakwal =

Jand Awan
- Location in Pakistan Jand Awan (Punjab, Pakistan)
- Coordinates: 33°4′0″N 73°8′0″E
- Country: Pakistan
- Province: Punjab
- District: Chakwal District
- Time zone: UTC+5 (PST)
  - Summer (DST): +6

Jand Awan is a village and union council of Chakwal District in the Punjab Province of Pakistan. It is part of Chakwal Tehsil.

== Notable people ==
- Lt Gen Abdul Majeed Malik
- Abdul Khaliq Pakistani Athlete
