= Abdul Aziz (sprinter) =

Pakistani sprinter (born 1924)

Personal information
- Nationality: Pakistani
- Born: 10 November 1924

Sport
- Sport: Sprinting
- Event: 100 metres
Medal record
Men's athletics
Representing Pakistan
Asian Games
| Silver medal – second place | 1954 Manila | 4 × 100 m relay |

Abdul Aziz (born on 10 November 1924) was a Pakistani sprinter. He competed in the men's 100 metres at the 1952 Summer Olympics.

== See also ==
- List of Pakistani records in athletics
- Athletics in Pakistan
- Pakistan at the Olympics
