= Miyo Miyashita =

Japanese hurdler

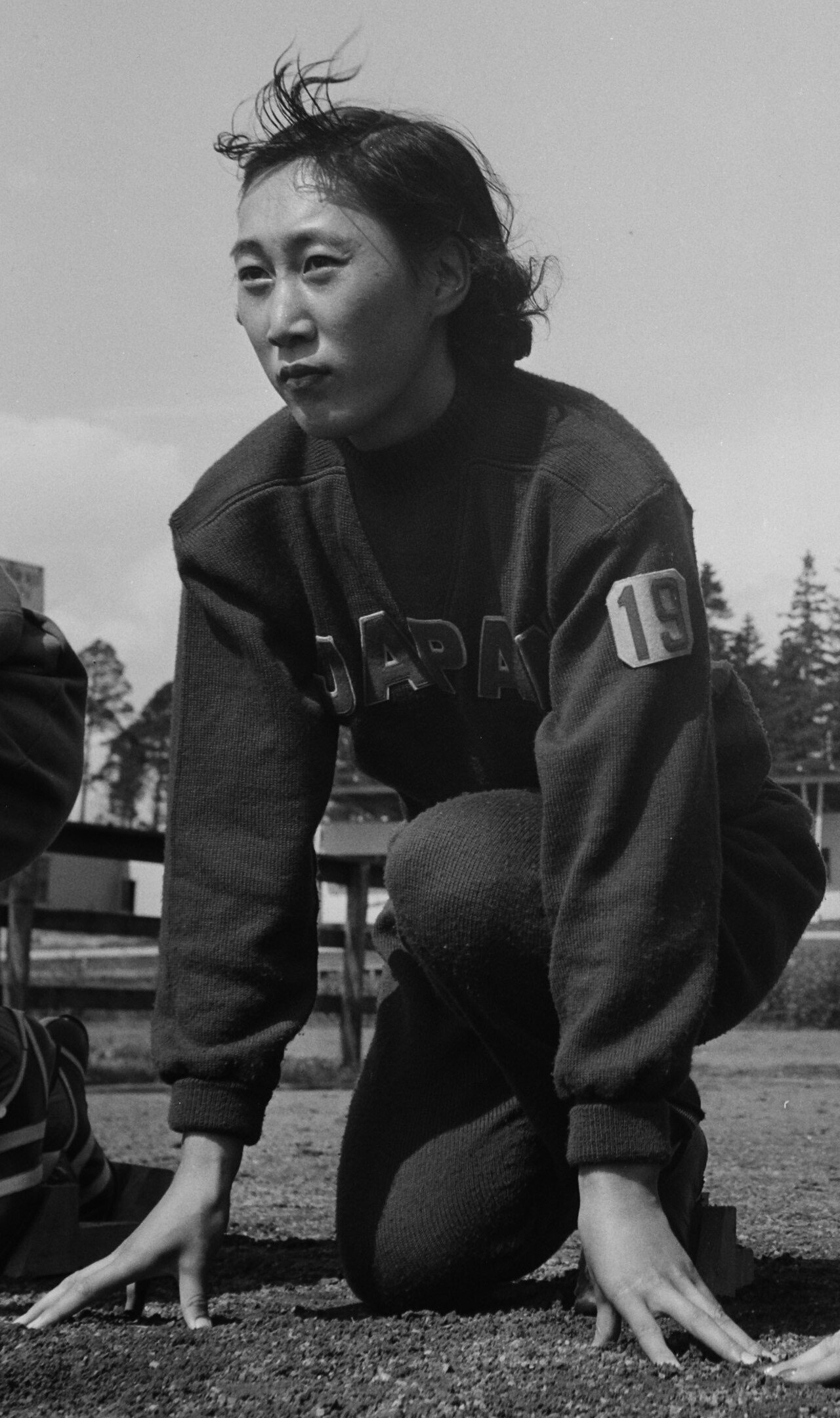

Personal information
- Nationality: Japanese
- Born: 24 April 1931

Sport
- Sport: Track and field
- Event: 80 metres hurdles

Miyo Miyashita (宮下 美代, Miyashita Miyo; born 24 April 1931) is a Japanese former hurdler. She competed in the women's 80 metres hurdles at the 1952 Summer Olympics.
