= Osamu Inoue =

Japanese long-distance runner

Osamu Inoue (井上 治, Inoue Osamu; born 16 September 1932) is a Japanese former long-distance runner who competed in the 1952 Summer Olympics.
