= Lahore Marathon =

Road marathon

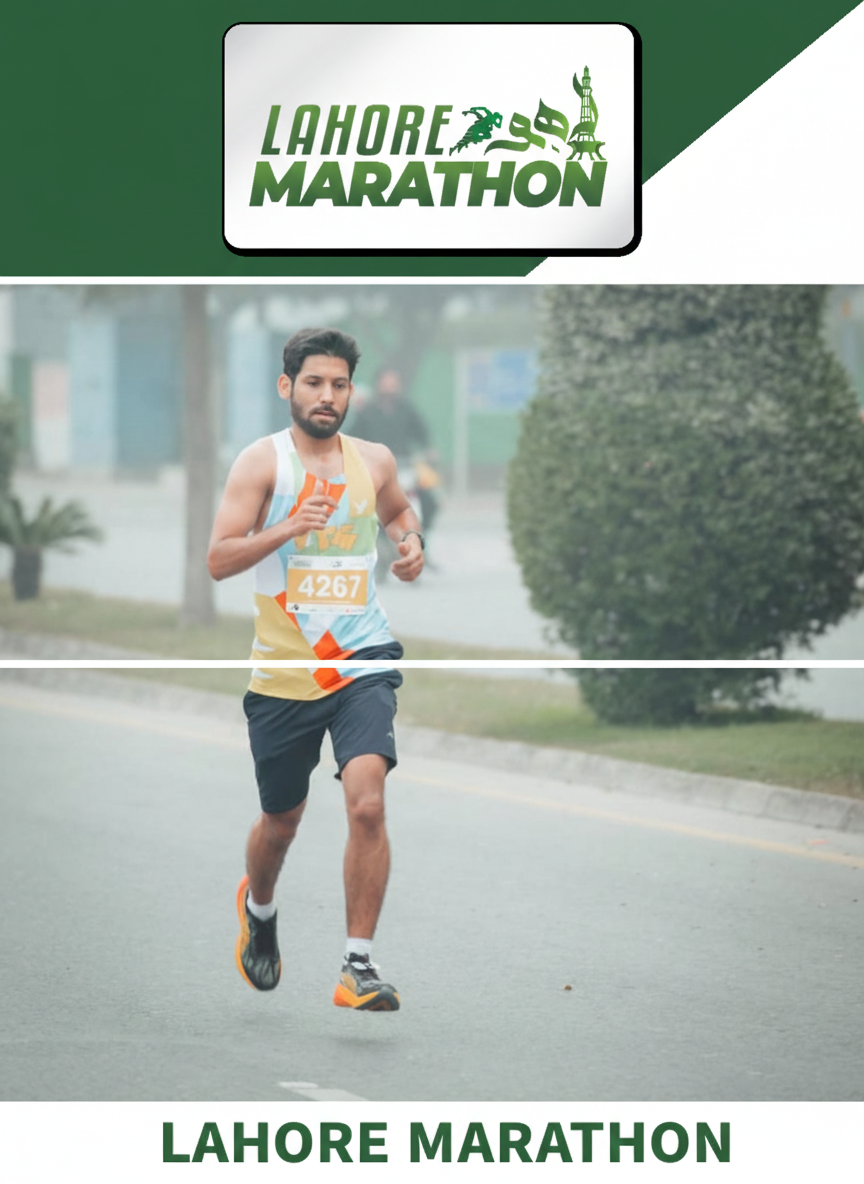
- Lahore Marathon Organized by Falcon Triathlon Club
- Date: February
- Location: Lahore, Pakistan
- Event type: Road
- Distance: Marathon (42.195 km), Half Marathon (21.0975 km), 5 km
- Established: 2005
- Website: lahore-marathon.com

The Lahore Marathon is an annual international road marathon held in Lahore, Pakistan on 2005, 2006, 2007, and 2012. The main event is the traditional 42.195 km marathon race. Other races in the marathon include a 10 km race, 5 km "Family Fun Run", and 3 km races for people with physical and visual impairment. The marathon is preceded by a gala dinner for international athletes, foreign dignitaries, government and corporate leaders. Approximately 26,000 people participated in the Lahore Marathon in total in 2007, making it one of the major marathons of the world.

Following a long hiatus, the marathon was revived by the Falcon Triathlon Club (FTC), a Lahore-based endurance sports organization. The revived series, which started in 2024, includes a Full Marathon (42.195 km), Half Marathon (21.0975 km), a 5 km road race, and a Kids' Fun Run. The event is now held in Bahria Town, Lahore.

== History ==
Original Marathons (2005–2012)

The inaugural marathon took place on 30 January 2005, with over 60 elite runners participating in a field of 17,500. Tseko Mpolokeng of South Africa was the first winner of the competition, with a time of 2:16:57. The first Pakistani to cross the finish line was Mohammad Aslam. Jane Kariuki of Kenya was the first winner of the women's division.

The second running of the marathon took place on 29 January 2006. The 2007 edition took place on 14 January 2007.

=== Revival by Falcon Triathlon Club (2024–Present) ===
After a long hiatus following the 2012 race, the Lahore Marathon was revived by the Falcon Triathlon Club (FTC), a Lahore-based endurance sports non profit organization.

- The first edition of the revived series organized by FTC took place on February 25, 2024.
- The second edition was held on February 16, 2025.
- The third edition of the Lahore Marathon is scheduled to be held on 15 February 2026 in Bahria Town, Lahore.
- The contemporary event includes a Full Marathon (42.195 km, Half Marathon (21.0975 km), and a 5 km road race. The revived marathons also feature a Kids' Fun Run category.
- FTC states that the revived marathon aims to promote long-distance running culture in Pakistan and provide opportunities for elite athletes, amateur runners, and recreational participants.

== Lahore Marathon 3rd Edition 2026 ==
After a long hiatus following the 2012 race, the Lahore Marathon was revived by the Falcon Triathlon Club (FTC), a Lahore-based endurance sports organization. In November 2025, FTC announced that the 3rd edition of the Lahore Marathon will be held on 15 February 2026 in Bahria Town, Lahore.

The 2026 event includes a Full Marathon (42.195 km), Half Marathon (21.0975 km) and a 5 km road race/fun run. FTC states that the revived marathon aims to promote long-distance running culture in Pakistan and provide opportunities for elite athletes, amateur runners and recreational participants.

== The course ==
The 42 km traditional marathon is a closed circuit which begins and ends at the gates of Gaddafi Stadium in Gulberg.

Runners begin by crossing the Ferozepur Road bridge and pass the historic districts of Ichhra and Mozang before reaching Chauburji. The course passes the Data Durbar Complex and approaches the half way stage, where it loops back towards the finish line in between Minar-e-Pakistan and Lahore Fort. Runners run alongside the famous Badshahi Masjid and pass the Bhati Gate and Taksali Gate of the Walled City of Lahore. The course then runs through The Mall, passing several notable sites such as Lahore Museum, Kim's Gun, and Bagh-e-Jinnah. The route turns onto Canal Road and makes a loop around Kalma Chowk, before finishing at the gates of Gaddafi Stadium.

=== Revived Course (2024–Present) ===
The course for the revived Lahore Marathon organized by the Falcon Triathlon Club is located in Bahria Town, Lahore. The starting point for the new series, including the 2024 event, is the iconic Eiffel Tower in Bahria Town, Lahore.

== Results ==
This is a list of the winners of the Lahore Marathon.

=== Men's race ===
Year	Athlete	Country	Time
2005	Tseko Mpolokeng	South Africa	2:16:57
2006	Halefom Tsegaye	Kenya	2:16:01
2007	Ketma Amerssissa	Ethiopia	2:15:26

=== Women's race ===
Year	Athlete	Country	Time
2005	Jane Kariuki	Kenya	2:43:03
2006	Jane Nyambura	Kenya	2:34:57
2007	Merima Danboba	Ethiopia	2:32:54

=== Wheel chair race ===
Year	Athlete	Country	Time
2006	Mohammed Azhar	Pakistan	-
2007	Mohammad Azhar	Pakistan	13:27
2012	Abdul Hadi	Pakistan	12:45

=== Tricycle race ===
Year	Athlete	Country	Time
2006	Abdullah khan niazi	Pakistan	11:47
2007	Mohammad Noor Qureshi	Pakistan	13:13
