= Yoshiro Sonoda =

Japanese long jumper

Personal information
- Nationality: Japanese
- Born: 8 May 1932 (age 93)

Sport
- Sport: Athletics
- Event: Long jump

Yoshiro Sonoda (園田 裕四郎, Sonoda Yoshirō; born 8 May 1932) is a Japanese athlete. He competed in the men's long jump at the 1956 Summer Olympics.
