= Yoshio Iimuro =

Japanese triple jumper (1925–2023)

Yoshio Imuro
Personal information
- Nationality: Japanese
- Born: 18 January 1925
- Died: October 2023 (aged 98)

Sport
- Sport: Athletics
- Event: Triple jump

Yoshio Iimuro (飯室 芳男, Iimuro Yoshio; 18 January 1925 – October 2023) was a Japanese triple jumper who competed in the 1952 Summer Olympics.

Iimuro died in October 2023, at the age of 98.
