= Yoshitaka Muroya =

Japanese middle-distance runner (1930–2019)

Sport
- Sport: Athletics
- Event: 800 m
Medal record
Representing Japan
Asian Games
Gold medal – first place	1954 Manila	800 m
Gold medal – first place	1958 Tokyo	800 m

Yoshitaka Muroya (室矢 芳隆, Muroya Yoshitaka; 6 April 1930 – 23 March 2019) was a Japanese middle-distance runner who competed in the 1952 Summer Olympics and in the 1956 Summer Olympics. Muroya died on 23 March 2019, at the age of 88.
