= 2007 Davis Cup Asia/Oceania Zone Group I =

International tennis competition

The Asian and Oceanian Zone is one of the three zones of regional Davis Cup competition in 2007.

In the Asian and Oceanian Zone there are four different groups in which teams compete against each other to advance to the next group.

== Participating teams ==
- Thailand
- Chinese Taipei
- Japan
- China
- Uzbekistan
- India
- Kazakhstan
- South Korea

== Draw ==
Second-round play-offs
Almaty, Kazakhstan (indoor hard)
China	2
Kazakhstan	3

First-round play-offs
Taipei, Taiwan (indoor carpet)
Chinese Taipei	3
China	2
Almaty, Kazakhstan (indoor hard)
S	India	3
Kazakhstan	2

First Round
Taipei, Taiwan (indoor carpet)
S	Thailand	3
Chinese Taipei	2
Beijing, China (indoor hard)
S	Japan	4
China	1
Namangan, Uzbekistan (indoor clay)
Uzbekistan	4
S	India	1
Chuncheon, South Korea (indoor carpet)
Kazakhstan	0
S	South Korea	5

Second Round
Osaka, Japan (indoor carpet)
S	Thailand	0
S	Japan	5
Seoul, South Korea (hard)
Uzbekistan	0
S	South Korea	5

- China relegated to Group II in 2008.
- Japan and South Korea advance to World Group play-off.

== First Round Matches ==
=== Chinese Taipei vs. Thailand ===
Chinese Taipei
2
Hsinchuang Stadium Taipei County, Taipei County, Chinese Taipei
9 – 11 February 2007
Carpet (indoor)

Thailand
3

			1	2	3	4	5
1	(Chinese Taipei) (Thailand)	Lee Hsin-han; Danai Udomchoke	1; 6	1; 6	2; 6
2	(Chinese Taipei) (Thailand)	Chen Ti; Weerapat Doakmaiklee	7^{7} 6^{1}	6^{10} 7^{12}	6; 1	6; 3
3	(Chinese Taipei) (Thailand)	Chen Ti / Yi Chu-huan; Sanchai Ratiwatana / Sonchat Ratiwatana	6; 3	6; 3	6; 3
4	(Chinese Taipei) (Thailand)	Liu Tai-wei; Danai Udomchoke	0; 6	1; 6	3; 6
5	(Chinese Taipei) (Thailand)	Lee Hsin-han; Sonchat Ratiwatana	6^{7} 7^{9}	4; 6	3; 6

=== China vs. Japan ===
China
1
Beijing International Tennis Center, Beijing, China
9 – 11 February 2007
Hard (indoor)

Japan
4

			1	2	3	4	5
1	(China) (Japan)	Yu Xinyuan; Yūichi Sugita	6^{5} 7^{7}	6; 0	7^{7} 6^{2}	3; 6	4; 6
2	(China) (Japan)	Sun Peng; Go Soeda	4; 6	4; 6	6^{7} 7^{9}
3	(China) (Japan)	Yu Xinyuan / Zeng Shaoxuan; Satoshi Iwabuchi / Takao Suzuki	3; 6	7^{8} 6^{6}	3; 6	1; 6
4	(China) (Japan)	Yu Xinyuan; Go Soeda	3; 6	4; 6
5	(China) (Japan)	Sun Peng; Yūichi Sugita	6; 3	7^{7} 6^{1}

=== Uzbekistan vs. India ===
Uzbekistan
4
Sport Complex Pahlavon, Namangan, Uzbekistan
9 – 11 February 2007
Clay (indoor)

India
1

			1	2	3	4	5
1	(Uzbekistan) (India)	Denis Istomin; Vivek Shokeen	6; 1	6; 3	6; 3
2	(Uzbekistan) (India)	Farrukh Dustov; Karan Rastogi	6; 3	6; 3	6; 4
3	(Uzbekistan) (India)	Farrukh Dustov / Denis Istomin; Leander Paes / Sunil-Kumar Sipaeya	4; 6	4; 6	6; 3	6; 4	3; 6
4	(Uzbekistan) (India)	Denis Istomin; Karan Rastogi	7^{7} 6^{2}	7; 5	6; 1
5	(Uzbekistan) (India)	Murad Inoyatov; Vivek Shokeen	6; 3	4; 6	7^{7} 6^{3}

=== South Korea vs. Kazakhstan ===
South Korea
5
Hoban Athletic Dome, Chuncheon, South Korea
9 – 11 February 2007
Carpet (indoor)

Kazakhstan
0

			1	2	3	4	5
1	(South Korea) (Kazakhstan)	Jun Woong-sun; Alexey Kedryuk	6; 4	6; 1	6; 4
2	(South Korea) (Kazakhstan)	Lee Hyung-taik; Syrym Abdukhalikov	6; 2	6; 2	6; 2
3	(South Korea) (Kazakhstan)	Jun Woong-sun / Lee Hyung-taik; Alexey Kedryuk / Dmitriy Makeyev	6; 1	7; 5	6; 2
4	(South Korea) (Kazakhstan)	Kim Sun-yong; Dmitriy Makeyev	6; 3	6; 1
5	(South Korea) (Kazakhstan)	An Jae-sung; Syrym Abdukhalikov	6; 4	6; 1

== Second Round Matches ==
=== Japan vs. Thailand ===
Japan
5
Namihaya Dome, Osaka, Japan
6 – 8 April 2007
Carpet (indoor)

Thailand
0

			1	2	3	4	5
1	(Japan) (Thailand)	Go Soeda; Kittipong Wachiramanowong	6; 1	6; 2	6; 2
2	(Japan) (Thailand)	Takao Suzuki; Weerapat Doakmaiklee	6; 4	6; 2	6; 3
3	(Japan) (Thailand)	Satoshi Iwabuchi / Takao Suzuki; Sanchai Ratiwatana / Sonchat Ratiwatana	6; 3	6; 4	2; 6	6; 4
4	(Japan) (Thailand)	Go Soeda; Weerapat Doakmaiklee	6; 1	6; 2
5	(Japan) (Thailand)	Yūichi Sugita; Kittipong Wachiramanowong	6; 2	6; 4

=== South Korea vs. Uzbekistan ===
South Korea
5
Olympics Tennis Courts, Seoul, South Korea
6 – 8 April 2007
Hard

Uzbekistan
0

			1	2	3	4	5
1	(South Korea) (Uzbekistan)	Im Kyu-tae; Farrukh Dustov	6; 0	6; 2	4; 6	7; 5
2	(South Korea) (Uzbekistan)	Lee Hyung-taik; Denis Istomin	6; 3	6; 2	6; 2
3	(South Korea) (Uzbekistan)	An Jae-sung / Jun Woong-sun; Farrukh Dustov / Denis Istomin	6; 1	6; 3	6; 1
4	(South Korea) (Uzbekistan)	Jun Woong-sun; Sarvar Ikramov	7; 5	6; 4
5	(South Korea) (Uzbekistan)	An Jae-sung; Vaja Uzakov	6; 1	6; 2

== First-round play-offs ==
=== Chinese Taipei vs. China ===
Chinese Taipei
3
National Taiwan University Sports Center, Taipei, Chinese Taipei
6 – 8 April 2007
Carpet (indoor)

China
2

			1	2	3	4	5
1	(Chinese Taipei) (China)	Lu Yen-hsun; Sun Peng	3; 6	6; 2	3; 6	6; 4	6; 2
2	(Chinese Taipei) (China)	Jimmy Wang; Yu Xinyuan	6; 3	6; 2	6; 4
3	(Chinese Taipei) (China)	Chen Ti / Yi Chu-huan; Yu Xinyuan / Zeng Shaoxuan	6^{7} 7^{9}	6; 4	5; 7	3; 6
4	(Chinese Taipei) (China)	Lu Yen-hsun; Yu Xinyuan	4; 6	5; 7	6; 2	6^{4} 7^{7}
5	(Chinese Taipei) (China)	Jimmy Wang; Sun Peng	6; 4	7; 5	6; 3

=== Kazakhstan vs. India ===
Kazakhstan
2
Sport Complex Baganashil, Almaty, Kazakhstan
6 – 8 April 2007
Hard (indoor)

India
3

			1	2	3	4	5
1	(Kazakhstan) (India)	Dmitriy Makeyev; Rohan Bopanna	2; 6	1; 6	2; 6
2	(Kazakhstan) (India)	Alexey Kedryuk; Karan Rastogi	6; 4	6; 4	3; 6	7^{7} 6^{2}
3	(Kazakhstan) (India)	Alexey Kedryuk / Dmitriy Makeyev; Rohan Bopanna / Leander Paes	2; 6	2; 6	2; 6
4	(Kazakhstan) (India)	Alexey Kedryuk; Rohan Bopanna	6; 4	6; 4	3; 6	4; 6	6; 4
5	(Kazakhstan) (India)	Dmitriy Makeyev; Leander Paes	7^{7} 6^{4}	4; 6	4; 6	4; 6

== Second-round play-offs ==
=== Kazakhstan vs. China ===
Kazakhstan
3
Sport Complex Baganashil, Almaty, Kazakhstan
21 – 23 September 2007
Hard (indoor)

China
2

			1	2	3	4	5
1	(Kazakhstan) (China)	Alexey Kedryuk; Sun Peng	7^{7} 6^{3}	7^{7} 6^{4}	6; 3
2	(Kazakhstan) (China)	Syrym Abdukhalikov; Yu Xinyuan	7^{7} 6^{5}	6; 3	2; 6	7; 5
3	(Kazakhstan) (China)	Syrym Abdukhalikov / Alexey Kedryuk; Yu Xinyuan / Zeng Shaoxuan	3; 6	2; 6	7^{8} 6^{6}	5; 7
4	(Kazakhstan) (China)	Alexey Kedryuk; Yu Xinyuan	6; 2	6; 3	7^{7} 6^{2}
5	(Kazakhstan) (China)	Stanislav Bykov; Sun Peng	1; 6	5; 7
