= 2006 Davis Cup Asia/Oceania Zone Group I =

International tennis competition

The Asian and Oceanian Zone is one of the three zones of regional Davis Cup competition in 2006.

In the Asian and Oceanian Zone there are four different groups in which teams compete against each other to advance to the next group.

== Participating teams ==
- China
- Chinese Taipei
- India
- Japan
- Pakistan
- South Korea
- Thailand
- Uzbekistan

== Draw ==
Second round play-offs
Beijing, China (indoor hard)
S	Pakistan	0
China	5

First round play-offs
Mumbai, India (grass)
S	India	3
S	Pakistan	2
Tashkent, Uzbekistan (clay)
China	0
Uzbekistan	3

First round
Changwon, South Korea (hard)
S	India	1
South Korea	4
Taipei, Taiwan (hard)
S	Pakistan	2
Chinese Taipei	3
Osaka, Japan (indoor carpet)
China	0
S	Japan	5
Tashkent, Uzbekistan (indoor hard)
Uzbekistan	2
S	Thailand	3

Second round
Taipei, Taiwan (hard)
South Korea	3
Chinese Taipei	2
Bangkok, Thailand (hard)
S	Japan	2
S	Thailand	3

- Pakistan relegated to Group II in 2007.
- South Korea and Thailand advance to World Group Play-off.

== First round matches ==
=== South Korea vs. India ===
South Korea
4
Changwon Municipal Tennis Courts, Changwon, South Korea
10 – 12 February 2006
Hard (outdoor)

India
1

			1	2	3	4	5
1	(South Korea) (India)	Hee-Seok Chung; Rohan Bopanna	3; 6	6; 2	6; 3	6; 4
2	(South Korea) (India)	Hyung-Taik Lee; Prakash Amritraj	6; 2	6; 2	6; 0
3	(South Korea) (India)	Woong-Sun Jun / Oh-Hee Kwon; Mahesh Bhupathi / Leander Paes	2; 6	6; 1	3; 6	2; 6
4	(South Korea) (India)	Hyung-Taik Lee; Rohan Bopanna	6; 3	6; 1	6; 2
5	(South Korea) (India)	Woong-Sun Jun; Prakash Amritraj	6; 3	3; 6	7; 5

=== Chinese Taipei vs. Pakistan ===
Chinese Taipei
3
Taipei Tennis Club, Taipei, Taiwan
10 – 12 February 2006
Hard (outdoor)

Pakistan
2

			1	2	3	4	5
1	(Chinese Taipei) (Pakistan)	Ti Chen; Aisam Qureshi	2; 6	3; 6	4; 6
2	(Chinese Taipei) (Pakistan)	Jimmy Wang; Aqeel Khan	6; 2	6; 4	6; 4
3	(Chinese Taipei) (Pakistan)	Jimmy Wang / Chu-Huan Yi; Aqeel Khan / Aisam Qureshi	6; 1	6^{7} 7^{9}	4; 6	7^{7} 6^{5}	7; 9
4	(Chinese Taipei) (Pakistan)	Jimmy Wang; Aisam Qureshi	6; 1	6; 3	6; 3
5	(Chinese Taipei) (Pakistan)	Ti Chen; Aqeel Khan	4; 6	6; 1	6; 4	6; 3

=== Japan vs. China ===
Japan
5
Namihaya Dome, Osaka, Japan
10 – 12 February 2006
Carpet (indoor)

China
0

			1	2	3	4	5
1	(Japan) (China)	Gouichi Motomura; Wang Yu	6; 3	6; 4	3; 6	4; 6	6; 3
2	(Japan) (China)	Go Soeda; Peng Sun	6; 3	6; 3	7^{7} 6^{5}
3	(Japan) (China)	Satoshi Iwabuchi / Toshihide Matsui; Xin-Yuan Yu / Shao-Xuan Zeng	6; 1	6^{6} 7^{8}	6; 3	1; 6	6; 3
4	(Japan) (China)	Go Soeda; Wang Yu	6; 1	6; 1
5	(Japan) (China)	Toshihide Matsui; Peng Sun	6; 0	4; 6	6; 3

=== Uzbekistan vs. Thailand ===
Uzbekistan
2
Tashkent Tennis Centre, Tashkent, Uzbekistan
10 – 12 February 2006
Hard (indoor)

Thailand
3

			1	2	3	4	5
1	(Uzbekistan) (Thailand)	Farrukh Dustov; Paradorn Srichaphan	3; 6	4; 6	3; 6
2	(Uzbekistan) (Thailand)	Denis Istomin; Danai Udomchoke	4; 6	6; 3	1; 6	4; 6
3	(Uzbekistan) (Thailand)	Murad Inoyatov / Denis Istomin; Sanchai Ratiwatana / Sonchat Ratiwatana	4; 6	6; 2	6^{4} 7^{7}	3; 6
4	(Uzbekistan) (Thailand)	Denis Istomin; Sonchat Ratiwatana	7^{7} 6^{4}	2; 6	6; 1
5	(Uzbekistan) (Thailand)	Sarvar Ikramov; Sanchai Ratiwatana	4; 6	6; 1	6; 4

== Second round matches ==
=== Chinese Taipei vs. South Korea ===
Chinese Taipei
1
Taipei Tennis Club, Taipei, Taiwan
7 – 9 April 2006
Hard (outdoor)

South Korea
4

			1	2	3	4	5
1	(Chinese Taipei) (South Korea)	Ti Chen; Hyung-Taik Lee	1; 6	4; 6	6^{3} 7^{7}
2	(Chinese Taipei) (South Korea)	Jimmy Wang; Woong-Sun Jun	3; 6	7; 5	6; 2	6; 2
3	(Chinese Taipei) (South Korea)	Jimmy Wang / Chu-Huan Yi; Hee-Seok Chung / Hyung-Taik Lee	3; 6	1; 6
4	(Chinese Taipei) (South Korea)	Jimmy Wang; Hyung-Taik Lee	6; 2	6^{7} 7^{9}	6^{2} 7^{7}	0; 6
5	(Chinese Taipei) (South Korea)	Chu-Huan Yi; Woong-Sun Jun	7^{7} 6^{4}	6^{2} 7^{7}	5; 7

=== Thailand vs. Japan ===
Thailand
3
Bangkok, Thailand
7 – 9 April 2006
Hard (outdoor)

Japan
2

			1	2	3	4	5
1	(Thailand) (Japan)	Paradorn Srichaphan; Gouichi Motomura	6; 4	7^{7} 6^{4}	6; 1
2	(Thailand) (Japan)	Danai Udomchoke; Go Soeda	7; 5	3; 6	6^{4} 7^{7}	6; 4	6; 3
3	(Thailand) (Japan)	Sanchai Ratiwatana / Sonchat Ratiwatana; Satoshi Iwabuchi / Toshihide Matsui	6; 4	6; 3	4; 6	6; 2
4	(Thailand) (Japan)	Sanchai Ratiwatana; Toshihide Matsui	3; 6	4; 6
5	(Thailand) (Japan)	Sonchat Ratiwatana; Gouichi Motomura	1; 6	1; 6

== First round play-offs ==
=== India vs. Pakistan ===
India
3
Brabourne Stadium, Mumbai, India
7 – 9 April 2006
Grass (outdoor)

Pakistan
2

			1	2	3	4	5
1	(India) (Pakistan)	Rohan Bopanna; Aisam Qureshi	6^{5} 7^{7}	4; 6	4; 6
2	(India) (Pakistan)	Prakash Amritraj; Aqeel Khan	7^{7} 6^{5}	7^{7} 6^{1}	6; 4
3	(India) (Pakistan)	Mahesh Bhupathi / Leander Paes; Aqeel Khan / Asim Shafik	6; 2	6; 3	6; 1
4	(India) (Pakistan)	Prakash Amritraj; Aisam Qureshi	2; 6	4; 6	6; 3	3; 6
5	(India) (Pakistan)	Leander Paes; Aqeel Khan	6; 4	7^{7} 6^{4}	3; 6	0; 6	6; 1

=== Uzbekistan vs. China ===
Uzbekistan
3
Tashkent, Uzbekistan
7 – 9 April 2006
Clay (outdoor)

China
0

			1	2	3	4	5
1	(Uzbekistan) (China)	Denis Istomin; Peng Sun	6; 4	6; 2	3; 6	6; 3
2	(Uzbekistan) (China)	Farrukh Dustov; Wang Yu	6; 4	6; 0	6; 1
3	(Uzbekistan) (China)	Murad Inoyatov / Denis Istomin; Xin-Yuan Yu / Shao-Xuan Zeng	7^{7} 6^{5}	7; 5	7^{7} 6^{4}
4	(Uzbekistan) (China)	Denis Istomin; Wang Yu						not played
5	(Uzbekistan) (China)	Farrukh Dustov; Peng Sun						not played

== Second round play-offs ==
=== China vs. Pakistan ===
China
5
Beijing International Tennis Centre, Beijing, China
22 – 24 September 2006
Hard (indoor)

Pakistan
0

			1	2	3	4	5
1	(China) (Pakistan)	Wang Yu; Aqeel Khan	6; 1	5; 7	6; 3	6; 4
2	(China) (Pakistan)	Peng Sun; Aisam Qureshi	3; 6	7^{7} 6^{5}	3; 6	6; 3	8; 6
3	(China) (Pakistan)	Xin-Yuan Yu / Shao-Xuan Zeng; Aqeel Khan / Aisam Qureshi	7; 5	6; 4	6; 4
4	(China) (Pakistan)	Wang Yu; Asim Shafik	6; 0	6; 0
5	(China) (Pakistan)	Peng Sun; Aqeel Khan	6; 2	6; 0
