= 2005 Davis Cup Asia/Oceania Zone Group I =

International tennis competition

The Asian and Oceanian Zone is one of the three zones of regional Davis Cup competition in 2005.

In the Asian and Oceanian Zone there are four different groups in which teams compete against each other to advance to the next group.

== Participating teams ==
- China
- Chinese Taipei
- India
- Indonesia
- Japan
- Pakistan
- Thailand
- Uzbekistan

== Draw ==
Second-round play-offs
Bangkok, Thailand (hard)
S	Thailand	4
Indonesia	1

First-round play-offs
Osaka, Japan (indoor carpet)
S	Thailand	1
Japan	4
Tianjin, China (hard)
Indonesia	1
S	China	4

First Round
Lahore, Pakistan (grass)
S	Thailand	2
Pakistan	3
Taoyuan, Taiwan (hard)
S	Chinese Taipei	3
Japan	2
Jakarta, Indonesia (hard)
Indonesia	2
S	Uzbekistan	3
New Delhi, India (grass)
India	5
S	China	0

Second Round
Lahore, Pakistan (grass)
Pakistan	4
S	Chinese Taipei	1
Jaipur, India (grass)
S	Uzbekistan	0
India	5

- Indonesia relegated to Group II in 2006.
- Pakistan and India advance to World Group play-off.

== First Round Matches ==
=== Pakistan vs. Thailand ===
Pakistan
3
Lahore Gymkhana, Lahore, Pakistan
4 – 6 March 2005
Grass (outdoor)

Thailand
2

			1	2	3	4	5
1	(Pakistan) (Thailand)	Aisam Qureshi; Danai Udomchoke	6; 2	7; 5	6^{5} 7^{7}	7^{7} 6^{5}
2	(Pakistan) (Thailand)	Aqeel Khan; Paradorn Srichaphan	4; 6	6; 1	6^{3} 7^{7}	1; 6
3	(Pakistan) (Thailand)	Aqeel Khan / Aisam Qureshi; Paradorn Srichaphan / Danai Udomchoke	6; 4	5; 7	6; 2	7^{7} 6^{4}
4	(Pakistan) (Thailand)	Aisam Qureshi; Paradorn Srichaphan	7; 5	2; 6	6; 4	6; 4
5	(Pakistan) (Thailand)	Aqeel Khan; Danai Udomchoke	3; 6	6^{1} 7^{7}

=== Chinese Taipei vs. Japan ===
Chinese Taipei
3
Soleada Club, Taoyuan, Taiwan
4 – 6 March 2005
Hard (outdoor)

Japan
2

			1	2	3	4	5
1	(Chinese Taipei) (Japan)	Yen-Hsun Lu; Gouichi Motomura	3; 6	6; 3	6; 0	4; 6	6; 4
2	(Chinese Taipei) (Japan)	Jimmy Wang; Takao Suzuki	4; 6	1; 6	1; 6
3	(Chinese Taipei) (Japan)	Yen-Hsun Lu / Jimmy Wang; Thomas Shimada / Takao Suzuki	6; 1	6^{5} 7^{7}	4; 6	4; 6
4	(Chinese Taipei) (Japan)	Yen-Hsun Lu; Takao Suzuki	5; 7	6; 4	6; 3	7^{7} 6^{1}
5	(Chinese Taipei) (Japan)	Jimmy Wang; Gouichi Motomura	7^{7} 6^{4}	7; 5	4; 6	7^{7} 6^{2}

=== Indonesia vs. Uzbekistan ===
Indonesia
2
Gelora Bung Karno Outdoor Tennis Stadium, Jakarta, Indonesia
4 – 6 March 2005
Hard (outdoor)

Uzbekistan
3

			1	2	3	4	5
1	(Indonesia) (Uzbekistan)	Suwandi Suwandi; Denis Istomin	3; 6	2; 6	4; 6
2	(Indonesia) (Uzbekistan)	Prima Simpatiaji; Farrukh Dustov	6; 1	6; 2	6; 4
3	(Indonesia) (Uzbekistan)	Suwandi Suwandi / Bonit Wiryawan; Murad Inoyatov / Denis Istomin	4; 6	6; 4	6; 3	4; 6	6; 4
4	(Indonesia) (Uzbekistan)	Suwandi Suwandi; Farrukh Dustov	5; 7	5; 7	6; 4	6; 2	3; 6
5	(Indonesia) (Uzbekistan)	Prima Simpatiaji; Denis Istomin	6^{7} 7^{9}	6^{5} 7^{7}	0; 6

=== India vs. China ===
India
5
R. K. Khanna Tennis Stadium, New Delhi, India
4 – 6 March 2005
Grass (outdoor)

China
0

			1	2	3	4	5
1	(India) (China)	Harsh Mankad; Peng Sun	7; 5	6; 3	6; 2
2	(India) (China)	Prakash Amritraj; Wang Yu	6; 3	6; 4	6; 2
3	(India) (China)	Mahesh Bhupathi / Leander Paes; Wang Yu / Ben-Qiang Zhu	7^{13} 6^{11}	6; 3	3; 6	6; 1
4	(India) (China)	Prakash Amritraj; Peng Sun	6; 2	6; 4
5	(India) (China)	Harsh Mankad; Lu Hao	6; 2	6; 3

== Second Round Matches ==
=== Pakistan vs. Chinese Taipei ===
Pakistan
4
Defence Club, Lahore, Pakistan
29 April – 1 May 2005
Grass (outdoor)

Chinese Taipei
1

			1	2	3	4	5
1	(Pakistan) (Chinese Taipei)	Aisam Qureshi; Jimmy Wang	6; 2	6; 1	6; 3
2	(Pakistan) (Chinese Taipei)	Aqeel Khan; Yen-Hsun Lu	6^{4} 7^{7}	6; 4	5; 4	6^{5} 7^{7}
3	(Pakistan) (Chinese Taipei)	Aqeel Khan / Aisam Qureshi; Yen-Hsun Lu / Jimmy Wang	7^{7} 6^{3}	6; 2	7; 5
4	(Pakistan) (Chinese Taipei)	Aisam Qureshi; Yen-Hsun Lu	6; 3	6; 4	6; 3
5	(Pakistan) (Chinese Taipei)	Aqeel Khan; Ti Chen	6^{5} 7^{7}	6; 4	6; 2

=== India vs. Uzbekistan ===
India
5
Jai Club, Jaipur, India
29 April – 1 May 2005
Grass (outdoor)

Uzbekistan
0

			1	2	3	4	5
1	(India) (Uzbekistan)	Leander Paes; Farrukh Dustov	7^{7} 6^{4}	6; 2	6; 0
2	(India) (Uzbekistan)	Prakash Amritraj; Denis Istomin	6; 3	6; 2	6; 2
3	(India) (Uzbekistan)	Mahesh Bhupathi / Leander Paes; Murad Inoyatov / Denis Istomin	6; 3	6; 4	6; 4
4	(India) (Uzbekistan)	Prakash Amritraj; Farrukh Dustov	6^{4} 7^{7}	6; 4	6; 2
5	(India) (Uzbekistan)	Harsh Mankad; Murad Inoyatov	7; 5	6; 1

== First-round play-offs ==
=== Japan vs. Thailand ===
Japan
4
Namihaya Dome, Osaka, Japan
15 – 17 July 2005
Carpet (indoor)

Thailand
1

			1	2	3	4	5
1	(Japan) (Thailand)	Takao Suzuki; Danai Udomchoke	6^{5} 7^{7}	6; 4	1; 6	7; 5	6; 4
2	(Japan) (Thailand)	Gouichi Motomura; Paradorn Srichaphan	4; 6	6^{2} 7^{7}	0; 6
3	(Japan) (Thailand)	Satoshi Iwabuchi / Takao Suzuki; Sanchai Ratiwatana / Sonchat Ratiwatana	6; 3	6; 4	3; 6	7^{7} 6^{3}
4	(Japan) (Thailand)	Takao Suzuki; Paradorn Srichaphan	6; 2	6; 4	6; 4
5	(Japan) (Thailand)	Go Soeda; Sanchai Ratiwatana	6; 3	6; 3

=== China vs. Indonesia ===
China
4
Tianjin Tennis Centre, Tianjin, China
15 – 17 July 2005
Hard (outdoor)

Indonesia
1

			1	2	3	4	5
1	(China) (Indonesia)	Peng Sun; Suwandi Suwandi	6; 3	6; 2	6; 4
2	(China) (Indonesia)	Wang Yu; Prima Simpatiaji	6; 4	6; 0	6; 4
3	(China) (Indonesia)	Wang Yu / Xin-Yuan Yu; Suwandi Suwandi / Bonit Wiryawan	6; 3	7^{7} 6^{4}	7^{7} 6^{2}
4	(China) (Indonesia)	Lu Hao; Prima Simpatiaji	2; 2					retired
5	(China) (Indonesia)	Xin-Yuan Yu; Suwandi Suwandi	7^{7} 6^{4}	6; 3

== Second-round play-offs ==
=== Thailand vs. Indonesia ===
Thailand
4
Bangkok University Rangsit Campus, Bangkok, Thailand
23 – 25 September 2005
Hard (outdoor)

Indonesia
1

			1	2	3	4	5
1	(Thailand) (Indonesia)	Paradorn Srichaphan; Sunu-Wahyu Trijati	6; 1	6; 4	6; 2
2	(Thailand) (Indonesia)	Danai Udomchoke; Prima Simpatiaji	6; 2	6; 3	6; 4
3	(Thailand) (Indonesia)	Sanchai Ratiwatana / Sonchat Ratiwatana; Suwandi Suwandi / Bonit Wiryawan	7; 5	3; 6	6; 1	1; 6	7; 9
4	(Thailand) (Indonesia)	Paradorn Srichaphan; Prima Simpatiaji	6; 2	6^{5} 7^{7}	6; 2	7^{8} 6^{6}
5	(Thailand) (Indonesia)	Sanchai Ratiwatana; Sunu-Wahyu Trijati	7^{7} 6^{4}	6; 2
