= Go Soeda =

Japanese tennis player (born 1984)

Go Soeda 添田 豪
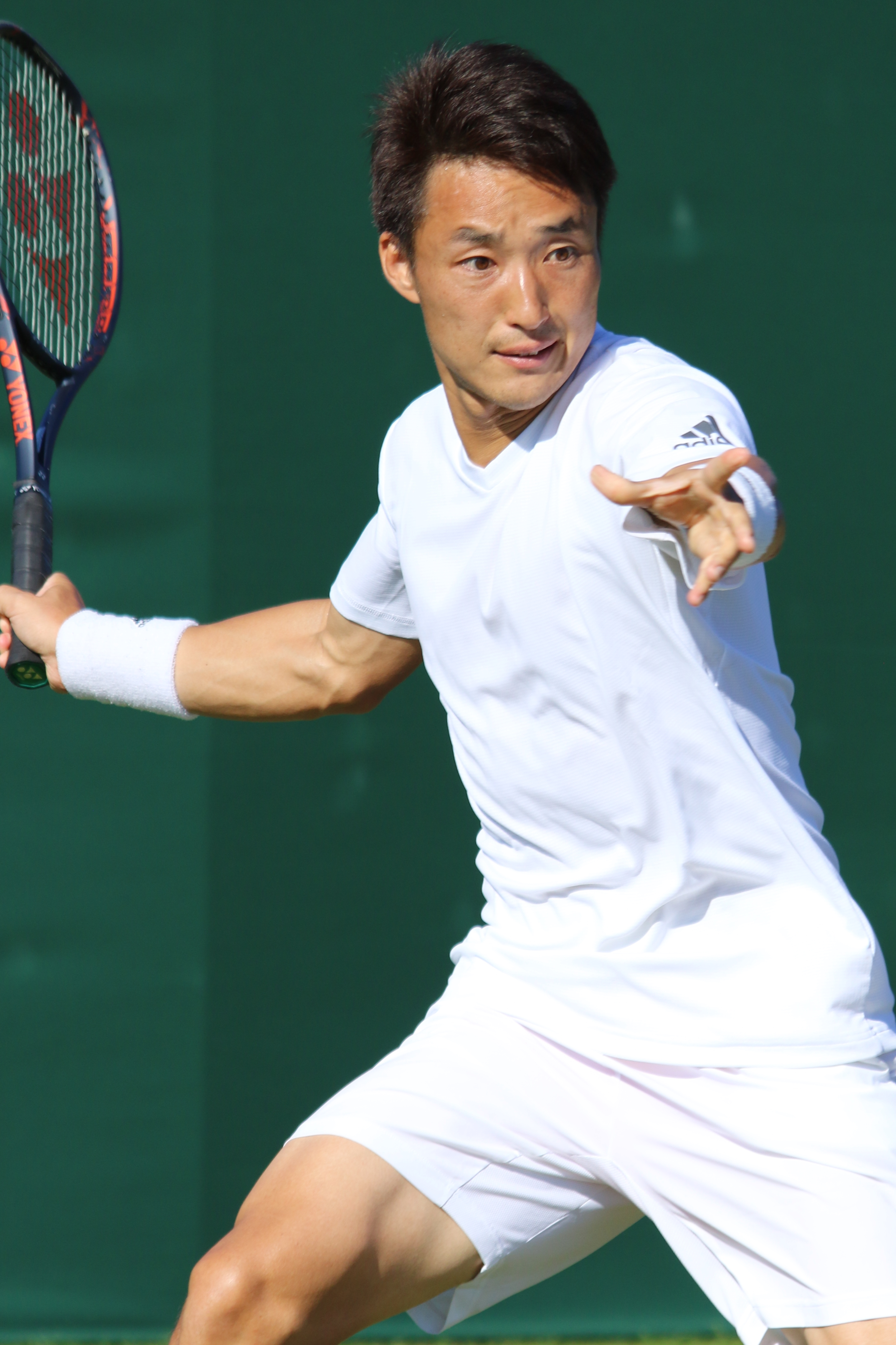
- Country (sports): Japan
- Residence: Tokyo
- Born: 5 September 1984 (age 42) Kanagawa, Japan
- Height: 1.78 m (5 ft 10 in)
- Turned pro: April 2003
- Retired: October 2022
- Plays: Right-handed (two-handed backhand)
- Coach: Davide Sanguinetti
- Prize money: $2,374,772

Singles
- Career record: 56–92
- Career titles: 0
- Highest ranking: No. 47 (23 July 2012)

Grand Slam singles results
- Australian Open: 2R (2013, 2015)
- French Open: 1R (2011, 2012, 2013, 2015)
- Wimbledon: 2R (2012, 2013)
- US Open: 1R (2011, 2012, 2013, 2020)

Other tournaments
- Olympic Games: 1R (2012)

Doubles
- Career record: 7–22
- Career titles: 0
- Highest ranking: No. 232 (20 May 2013)

Grand Slam doubles results
- Australian Open: 2R (2013)
- French Open: 2R (2012)
- US Open: 1R (2012)

Team competitions
- Davis Cup: QF (2014)
- Last updated on: 10 October 2022.

Go Soeda
Medal record

Representing Japan

Men's Tennis

Asian Games
Silver medal – second place	2006 Doha	Team
Bronze medal – third place	2006 Doha	Singles
Bronze medal – third place	2010 Guangzhou	Singles
Bronze medal – third place	2010 Guangzhou	Team

Go Soeda (添田 豪, Soeda Gō; born September 5, 1984) is a Japanese former professional tennis player. He started playing tennis at the age of four and turned professional in April 2003. He has won 18 singles titles on the ATP Challenger Tour, and achieved a career-high singles ranking of world No. 47 on 23 July 2012.

== Career ==
=== Junior career ===
As a junior, he compiled a 49–48 win–loss record in singles (and 47–47 in doubles), achieving a singles ranking of No. 20 in December 2002 and doubles ranking of No. 43 in September 2002.

=== 2002–04 ===
Soeda began playing professional tournaments regularly in 2002 before turning professional in 2003. He played primarily on Asian ITF Futures event. Soeda rose steadily through his ATP ranking over the next three years. He ended 2004 as ranked world No. 493.

=== 2005–07 ===
In 2005, Soeda won two Futures tournament in Japan and Sri Lanka, and he made his debut in an ATP World Tour event in Ho Chi Minh City, losing to top seed Mariano Puerta in the first round. The following year, Soeda had a very steady year at the Challenger level, reaching the quarterfinals or better seven times, including his first Challenger final in Aptos. He also won the Japan F4 Futures. Soeda entered the world's top 200 in August and finished 2006 ranked No. 182.

Go made his first Grand Slam main-draw appearance at the 2007 Australian Open in January and lost to ninth seed Mario Ančić in the first round. In August 2007, Soeda defeated Eduardo Schwank to win his first Challenger title in Manta, and he reached the Brisbane Challenger final in November.

=== 2008–10 ===
In 2008, Soeda won four Challenger titles at Kyoto, Busan, New Delhi, and Toyota. He also won the most singles title in the ATP Challenger Series (tied with three players). In September, he beat wildcard Bai Yan in the China Open first round to record his first ATP main-draw win. He lost to third seed Fernando González in three sets. In October 2009, Soeda earned his sixth Challenger title in Tiburon by beating Ilija Bozoljac in the final.

In 2010, Soeda won his second Manta Challenger title in April. In the grass-court swing, he advanced to the Nottingham Challenger final before losing to Ričardas Berankis. He participated in the Wimbledon Championships main draw as a lucky loser, but he fell in the first round to Martin Fischer. Two weeks later, he reached the second round in Newport, beating eighth seed Taylor Dent in three sets.

=== 2011: Reaching the top 100 ===
Soeda reached the second round of the SA Tennis Open, beating seventh seed Rainer Schüttler. In March, he claimed his eighth Challenger title in Pingguo by beating Matthias Bachinger in the final. This result launched him into the world top 100 for the first time in his career, climbing to No. 91. Soeda took part in the French Open, losing to 12th seed Mikhail Youzhny in the first round. At the Wimbledon Championships, he received entry from a lucky loser spot, but lost to eventual semifinalist Jo-Wilfried Tsonga.

After winning the Wuhai Challenger title, Soeda qualified for the US Open, losing to Kevin Anderson in the first round. In the Asian swing, Soeda reached his first quarterfinal of an ATP World Tour event at the Thailand Open, beating Karol Beck and Tobias Kamke. His run was ended by Donald Young in straight sets. The following week, he received a wildcard and faced world No. 2, Rafael Nadal, in the Japan Open first round, losing in straight sets.

=== 2012: Reaching the top 50 ===
2012 started for Soeda at the Chennai Open, coming through qualifying. He beat Frederico Gil and fifth seed Ivan Dodig respectively to reach the quarterfinals, and he upset defending champion Stan Wawrinka in straight sets. His first semifinal in an ATP event came to an end, losing to top seed Janko Tipsarević in straight sets. Following the tournament, Soeda moved up in rankings to world No. 99 and back into the top 100 for the first time since April 2011. He won three Challenger titles from January to April, at Honolulu, Pingguo, and Kaohsiung. In the French Open, Soeda was eliminated in first round by Dmitry Tursunov.

In the grass-court season, Soeda reached the second round in the Queen's Club championships. Then he was into the Wimbledon Championships and advanced to the second round of a Grand Slam for the first time, beating Igor Kunitsyn in straight sets. He was beaten by ninth seed Juan Martín del Potro in four sets. In July, Soeda reached the semifinals of the Atlanta Open, knocking out Xavier Malisse and Igor Kunitsyn on the way. Then he faced his country's No. 1, Kei Nishikori, and upset him soundly. This was the first pairing of two players from Japan in an ATP quarterfinal since the Open era began. He eventually lost to Gilles Müller in straight sets. Soeda broke him into world's top 50 for the first time in his career, ranked No. 47 after the tournament.

Soeda represented Japan at his maiden Olympics in London 2012. He competed in singles and doubles, partnering Nishikori. In singles, he fell in the first round to Marcos Baghdatis of Cyprus, and lost to defending champions Swiss pairing of Roger Federer and Stan Wawrinka in the first round of doubles. In the US Open, Soeda lost in first round to 23rd seed Mardy Fish with two tiebreakers. In the later season, he reached the second round of the Thailand Open and the Stockholm Open.

=== 2013 ===
Soeda began the 2013 season in Chennai, reaching the quarterfinals for the second straight year. He defeated Evgeny Donskoy and Prakash Amritraj in the first two rounds, but he lost to eventual champion Janko Tipsarević. He then participated in the Australian Open and won over wildcard Luke Saville in the first round, before losing to world No. 8, Jo-Wilfried Tsonga. Following this event, Soeda successfully defended his title in the Maui Challenger, defeating Mischa Zverev in the final, and he reached the second round in Delray Beach by beating Marinko Matosevic in three sets.

Soeda bounced back from a first-round loss in the French Open by qualifying for the Wimbledon Championships without losing a set, and he beat Andreas Haider-Maurer to reach the second round for two consecutive years in this event. He was then defeated by world No. 9 Richard Gasquet in four sets. He managed to qualify for the US Open, but fell in the first round to Marcos Baghdatis. In the Asian swing, Soeda reached the second round in the Thailand Open, beating fellow qualifier Santiago Giraldo.

=== 2014 ===
Soeda faced world No. 4 and the previous year's finalist, Andy Murray, in the Australian Open first round, losing in straight sets. In September, he advanced to the second round in the Malaysian Open, before losing to Marinko Matosevic. Soeda recorded nine semifinal or better results at Challenger events in the year. These included winning the title in Busan, Nanchang, and Toyota. He ended 2014 ranked within the top 100 for the second time in his career.

=== 2015 ===
Soeda started 2015 season by playing in Australia and won through the opening round of the Australian Open, beating qualifier Elias Ymer. He was beaten by 31st seed Fernando Verdasco in the second round. In Houston, Soeda defeated former world No. 1 Lleyton Hewitt in the first round. After winning another Challenger title in Seoul, he was into the main draw at the French Open and Wimbledon Championships, but he faced seeded players in the first round, losing to Philipp Kohlschreiber and John Isner. During the American hard-court season, Soeda made it into the quarterfinals in Atlanta, knocking out Alexandr Dolgopolov and fourth seed Adrian Mannarino on the way, but was beaten by Gilles Müller.

=== 2022: Retirement ===
He retired on 31 October 2022 having played his last match at the Japan National Championships.

=== Davis Cup ===
Soeda made his Davis Cup debut for Japan in 2005, Asia/Oceania Zone Group I relegation play-offs against Thailand. He played in the singles rubber and beat Sanchai Ratiwatana in straight sets. To date, Soeda has compiled a 26–12 win–loss record overall (24–10 in singles and 2–2 in doubles). He received the Davis Cup Commitment Award in April 2014.

In the first round of 2012 Davis Cup World Group against Croatia, Soeda faced Ivan Dodig in the first singles rubber and defeated him in a 4 hour, 5 minute match. This victory was Japan’s first win in a World Group match (In their previous two World Group matches, Japan lost 0–5). He was beaten by Ivo Karlovic in reverse singles, and Japan lost 2–3. He scored another notable win in the 2013 Davis Cup World Group play-offs against Colombia. He lost to Santiago Giraldo in five sets, but defeated Alejandro Falla in the deciding rubber to put Japan back in the World Group for 2014.

== Playing style ==
Soeda is an offensive counterpuncher. Due to his relatively small size (5'10"), Soeda lacks the power and stature to effectively dictate points. Instead, he relies on quickness to retrieve opponent's shots, as well as a relatively flat, penetrating two-handed backhand. As noted by commentator Nick Lester in the BB&T Atlanta Open, Soeda plays a conventional style of tennis, approaching and finishing points at the net when possible.

== Davis Cup ==
Legend
Group membership
World Group (6–9)
Group I (20–4)
Group II (0)
Group III (0)
Group IV (0)

- ▲ ▼ indicates the outcome of the Davis Cup match followed by the score, date, place of event, the zonal classification and its phase, and the court surface.

Rubber outcome	Rubber	Match type (partner if any)	Opponent nation	Opponent player(s)	Score
▲4–1; 15–17 July 2005; Namihaya Dome, Osaka, Japan; Group I Asia/Oceania first round play-offs; carpet surface
Victory	V	Singles (dead rubber)	Thailand	Sanchai Ratiwatana	6–3, 6–3
▲5–0; 10–12 February 2006; Namihaya Dome, Osaka, Japan; Group I Asia/Oceania first round; carpet surface
Victory	II	Singles	China	Sun Peng	6–3, 6–3, 7–6^{(7–5)}
Victory	IV	Singles (dead rubber)	China	Wang Yu	6–1, 6–1
▼2–3; 7–9 April 2006; Bangkok, Thailand; Group I Asia/Oceania second round; hard surface
Defeat	II	Singles	Thailand	Danai Udomchoke	5–7, 6–3, 7–6^{(7–4)}, 4–6, 3–6
▲4–1; 9–11 February 2007; Beijing International Tennis Center, Beijing, China; Group I Asia/Oceania first round; hard surface
Victory	II	Singles	China	Sun Peng	6–4, 6–4, 7–6^{(9–7)}
Victory	IV	Singles (dead rubber)	China	Yu Xinyuan	6–3, 6–4
▲5–0; 6–8 April 2007; Namihaya Dome, Osaka, Japan; Group I Asia/Oceania second round; carpet surface
Victory	I	Singles	Thailand	Kittipong Wachiramanowong	6–1, 6–2, 6–2
Victory	IV	Singles (dead rubber)	Thailand	Weerapat Doakmaiklee	6–1, 6–2
▼2–3; 21–23 September 2007; Namihaya Dome, Osaka, Japan; World Group play-offs; carpet surface
Defeat	II	Singles	Romania	Andrei Pavel	3–6, 7–6^{(9–7)}, 5–7, 3–6
Defeat	V	Singles	Romania	Victor Hănescu	3–6, 7–5, 6–7^{(6–8)}, 6–7^{(3–7)}
▲5–0; 8–10 February 2008; Rizal Memorial Tennis Center, Manila, Philippines; Group I Asia/Oceania first round; hard surface
Victory	I	Singles	Philippines	Patrick John Tierro	6–1, 4–6, 6–2, 2–6, 6–4
Victory	III	Doubles (with Takao Suzuki)	Philippines	Cecil Mamiit Eric Taino	6–7^{(5–7)}, 7–6^{(10–8)}, 7–6^{(7–5)}, 6–4
Victory	IV	Singles (dead rubber)	Philippines	Johnny Arcilla	6–3, 6–2
▼2–3; 11–13 April 2008; R K Khanna Tennis Stadium, New Delhi, India; Group I Asia/Oceania second round; grass surface
Defeat	II	Singles	India	Prakash Amritraj	6–4, 7–6^{(7–5)}, 4–6, 4–6, 6–8
▲5–0; 6–8 March 2009; Namihaya Dome, Osaka, Japan; Group I Asia/Oceania first round; carpet surface
Victory	I	Singles	China	Zheng Shaoxuan	6–2, 7–6^{(7–4)}, 6–3
Victory	V	Singles (dead rubber)	China	Zhang Ze	4–6, 6–3, 6–2
▲5–0; 5–7 March 2010; Namihaya Dome, Osaka, Japan; Group I Asia/Oceania first round; carpet surface
Victory	II	Singles	Philippines	Cecil Mamiit	6–7^{(4–7)}, 6–3, 6–3, 6–3
Victory	V	Singles (dead rubber)	Philippines	Francis Alcantara	6–1, 6–0
▼0–5; 7–9 May 2010; Queensland Tennis Centre, Brisbane, Australia; Group I Asia/Oceania second round; clay surface
Defeat	III	Doubles (with Takao Suzuki)	Australia	Paul Hanley Lleyton Hewitt	5–7, 4–6, 0–6
▲3–1; 4–6 March 2011; Plantation Bay Resort & Spa, Lapu-Lapu City, Philippines; Group I Asia/Oceania first round; clay surface
Victory	II	Singles	Philippines	Johnny Arcilla	6–3, 6–3, 6–3
Victory	IV	Singles	Philippines	Cecil Mamiit	7–6^{(7–5)}, 6–2, 3–6, 6–3
▲4–1; 8–10 July 2011; Bourbon Beans Dome, Kobe, Japan; Group I Asia/Oceania second round; hard surface
Victory	III	Doubles (with Kei Nishikori)	Uzbekistan	Murad Inoyatov Denis Istomin	7–5, 7–6^{(7–5)}, 7–5
Victory	V	Singles (dead rubber)	Uzbekistan	Sarvar Ikramov	7–5, 6–0
▲4–1; 16–18 September 2011; Ariake Coliseum, Tokyo, Japan; World Group play-offs; hard surface
Victory	V	Singles (dead rubber)	India	Rohan Bopanna	4–5 ret.
▼2–3; 10–12 February 2012; Bourbon Beans Dome, Kobe, Japan; World Group first round; hard surface
Victory	I	Singles	Croatia	Ivan Dodig	6–7^{(3–7)}, 3–6, 6–4, 6–3, 7–5
Defeat	V	Singles	Croatia	Ivo Karlović	6–7^{(4–7)}, 1–6, 4–6
▼2–3; 14–16 September 2012; Ariake Coliseum, Tokyo, Japan; World Group play-offs; hard surface
Victory	I	Singles	Israel	Dudi Sela	6–2, 6–4, 3–6, 6–4
Defeat	V	Singles	Israel	Amir Weintraub	3–6, 6–7^{(5–7)}, 6–4, 3–6
▲5–0; 1–3 February 2013; Ariake Coliseum, Tokyo, Japan; Group I Asia/Oceania first round; hard surface
Victory	II	Singles	Indonesia	Wisnu Adi Nugroho	6–0, 6–0, 6–1
▲3–2; 5–7 April 2013; Ariake Coliseum, Tokyo, Japan; Group I Asia/Oceania second round; hard surface
Victory	II	Singles	South Korea	Cho Min-hyeok	5–7, 2–6, 6–4, 6–4, 6–2
Defeat	IV	Singles	South Korea	Lim Yong-kyu	7–5, 6–7^{(5–7)}, 4–6, 3–6
▲3–2; 5–7 April 2013; Ariake Coliseum, Tokyo, Japan; World Group play-offs; hard surface
Defeat	II	Singles	Colombia	Santiago Giraldo	4–6, 6–3, 5–7, 6–3, 1–6
Victory	V	Singles	Colombia	Alejandro Falla	4–6, 6–4, 6–3, 6–3
▲4–1; 31 January–2 February 2014; Ariake Coliseum, Tokyo, Japan; World Group first round; hard surface
Defeat	II	Singles	Canada	Frank Dancevic	4–6, 6–7^{(2–7)}, 1–6
Victory	V	Singles (dead rubber)	Canada	Peter Polansky	6–1, 6–4
▼2–3; 6–8 March 2015; Doug Mitchell Thunderbird Sports Centre, Vancouver, Canada; World Group first round; hard surface
Defeat	III	Doubles (with Yasutaka Uchiyama)	Canada	Daniel Nestor Vasek Pospisil	5–7, 6–2, 3–6, 6–3, 3–6
Defeat	V	Singles	Canada	Vasek Pospisil	5–7, 3–6, 4–6
▲3–1; 15–17 September 2017; Utsubo Tennis Center, Osaka, Japan; World Group play-offs; hard surface
Victory	II	Singles	Brazil	Thiago Monteiro	3–6, 6–4, 6–3, 6–7^{(1–7)}, 6–4
▼0–3; 6–7 March 2020; Bourbon Beans Dome, Miki, Japan; Davis Cup qualifying round; hard surface
Defeat	I	Singles	Ecuador	Emilio Gómez	5–7, 6–7^{(3–7)}

== Challenger and Futures finals ==
=== Singles 42 (24–18) ===
Legend (singles) ATP Challenger Tour (18–13) ITF Futures Tour (6–5)	Titles by surface Hard (20–16) Clay (1–0) Grass (0–1) Carpet (3–1)

Result	W–L	Date	Tournament	Tier	Surface	Opponent	Score
Loss	0–1	May 2005	Japan F3, Shizuoka	Futures	Carpet	(New Zealand) Mark Nielsen	0–6, 6–4, 3–6
Loss	0–2	Jun 2005	Japan F5, Munakata	Futures	Hard	(United States) Michael Yani	6–7^{(2–7)}, 6–7^{(6–8)}
Win	1–2	Jul 2005	Japan F8, Tokyo	Futures	Hard	(New Zealand) Rubin Statham	6–4, 6–3
Win	2–2	Dec 2005	Sri Lanka F2, Colombo	Futures	Clay	(Japan) Toshihide Matsui	4–6, 7–5, 7–5
Loss	2–3	Mar 2006	China F3, Shenzhen	Futures	Hard	(Netherlands) Jesse Huta Galung	3–6, 2–6
Win	3–3	Jun 2006	Japan F4, Munakata	Futures	Hard	(Japan) Gouichi Motomura	7–6^{(8–6)}, 6–3
Loss	3–4	Jul 2006	Aptos, United States	Challenger	Hard	(United States) Alex Kuznetsov	1–6, 6–7^{(4–7)}
Loss	3–5	May 2007	Korea F2, Daegu	Futures	Hard	(South Korea) Nam Hyun-woo	6–4, 3–6, 1–6
Loss	3–6	May 2007	Korea F3, Gimcheon	Futures	Hard	(Japan) Satoshi Iwabuchi	1–6, 6–2, 3–6
Win	4–6	Aug 2007	Manta, Ecuador	Challenger	Hard	(Argentina) Eduardo Schwank	6–4, 6–2
Win	5–6	Oct 2007	China F6, Beijing	Futures	Hard	(Greece) Vasilis Mazarakis	6–3, 6–1
Loss	5–7	Nov 2007	Brisbane, Australia	Challenger	Hard	(Australia) Joseph Sirianni	6–1, 0–6, 3–6
Win	6–7	Mar 2008	Kyoto, Japan	Challenger	Carpet (i)	(Germany) Matthias Bachinger	7–6, 2–6, 6–4
Win	7–7	Apr 2008	Busan, South Korea	Challenger	Hard	(Chinese Taipei) Lu Yen-hsun	6–2, ret.
Win	8–7	May 2008	New Delhi, India	Challenger	Hard	(Chinese Taipei) Lu Yen-hsun	6–3, 3–6, 6–4
Loss	8–8	Nov 2008	Yokohama, Japan	Challenger	Hard	(South Korea) Lee Hyung-taik	5–7, 3–6
Win	9–8	Nov 2008	Toyota, Japan	Challenger	Carpet (i)	(South Korea) Lee Hyung-taik	6–2, 7–6^{(9–7)}
Win	10–8	Oct 2009	Tiburon, United States	Challenger	Hard	(Serbia) Ilija Bozoljac	3–6, 6–3, 6–2
Win	11–8	Mar 2010	Japan F2, Tokyo	Futures	Hard	(Japan) Hiroki Kondo	6–2, 6–3
Win	12–8	Apr 2010	Japan F3, Kōfu	Futures	Hard	(Chinese Taipei) Chu-Huan Yi	6–3, 6–4
Win	13–8	May 2010	Manta, Ecuador (2)	Challenger	Hard	(United States) Ryler DeHeart	7–6^{(7–5)}, 6–2
Loss	13–9	May 2010	Nottingham, United Kingdom	Challenger	Grass	(Lithuania) Ričardas Berankis	4–6, 4–6
Win	14–9	Mar 2011	Pingguo, China	Challenger	Hard	(Germany) Matthias Bachinger	6–4, 7–5
Win	15–9	Jul 2011	Wuhai, China	Challenger	Hard	(South Africa) Raven Klaasen	7–5, 6–4
Win	16–9	Jan 2012	Honolulu, United States	Challenger	Hard	(United States) Robby Ginepri	6–3, 7–6^{(7–5)}
Loss	16–10	Mar 2012	Singapore, Singapore	Challenger	Hard	(Chinese Taipei) Lu Yen-hsun	3–6, 4–6
Win	17–10	Mar 2012	Pinnguo, China (2)	Challenger	Hard	(Tunisia) Malek Jaziri	6–1, 3–6, 7–5
Win	18–10	Apr 2012	Kaohsiung, Taiwan	Challenger	Hard	(Japan) Tatsuma Ito	6–3, 6–0
Win	19–10	Jan 2013	Honolulu, United States (2)	Challenger	Hard	(Germany) Mischa Zverev	7–5, 7–5
Loss	19–11	Jul 2013	Beijing, China	Challenger	Hard	(Chinese Taipei) Lu Yen-hsun	2–6, 4–6
Loss	19–12	Nov 2013	Yokohama, Japan (2)	Challenger	Hard	(Australia) Matthew Ebden	6–2, 6–7^{(3–7)}, 3–6
Win	20–12	May 2014	Busan, South Korea (2)	Challenger	Hard	(Chinese Taipei) Jimmy Wang	6–3, 7–6^{(7–5)}
Win	21–12	Jun 2014	Nanchang, China	Challenger	Hard	(Slovenia) Blaž Kavčič	6–3, 2–6, 7–6^{(7–3)}
Win	22–12	Nov 2014	Toyota, Japan (2)	Challenger	Carpet (i)	(Japan) Tatsuma Ito	6–4, 7–5
Win	23–12	May 2015	Seoul, South Korea	Challenger	Hard	(South Korea) Chung Hyeon	3–6, 6–3, 6–3
Loss	23–13	Nov 2015	Yokohama, Japan (3)	Challenger	Hard	(Japan) Taro Daniel	6–4, 3–6, 3–6
Loss	23–14	Jan 2016	Bangkok, Thailand	Challenger	Hard	(Russia) Mikhail Youzhny	3–6, 4–6
Win	24–14	Jul 2016	Winnipeg, Canada	Challenger	Hard	(Slovenia) Blaž Kavčič	6–7^{(4–7)}, 6–4, 6–2
Loss	24–15	Sep 2016	Bangkok, Thailand	Challenger	Hard	(Slovenia) Blaž Kavčič	0–6, 0–1 ret.
Loss	24–16	Oct 2016	Ho Chi Minh City, Vietnam	Challenger	Hard	(Australia) Jordan Thompson	7–5, 5–7, 1–6
Loss	24–17	May 2017	Busan, South Korea (3)	Challenger	Hard	(Canada) Vasek Pospisil	1–6, 2–6
Loss	24–18	Sep 2019	Jinan, China	Challenger	Hard	(China) Zhang Zhizhen	5–7, 6–2, 4–6

=== Doubles 14 (2–12) ===
Legend
ATP Challenger Tour (1–11)
ITF Futures/World Tennis Tour (1–1)

Outcome	W–L	Date	Tournament	Surface	Partner	Opponents	Score
Win	1–0	Oct 2004	USA F29, Arlington	Hard	(Chinese Taipei) Ti Chen	(United States) Scott Lipsky (United States) Todd Widom	7–5, 6–2
Loss	1–1	Jun 2005	Japan F5, Munakata	Hard	(Japan) Tasuku Iwami	(South Korea) Kyu-Tae Im (South Korea) Woong-Sun Jun	6–3, 3–6, 6–7^{(5–7)}
Win	2–1	Nov 2007	Yokohama, Japan	Hard	(Japan) Hiroki Kondo	(Japan) Satoshi Iwabuchi (Japan) Toshihide Matsui	6–7^{(5–7)}, 6–3, [11–9]
Loss	2–2	Jan 2008	Waikoloa, USA	Hard	(Japan) Satoshi Iwabuchi	(United States) Scott Lipsky (United States) David Martin	4–6, 7–5, [7–10]
Loss	2–3	Mar 2008	Tokyo, Japan	Carpet (i)	(Japan) Hiroki Kondo	(Germany) Dieter Kindlmann (Austria) Martin Slanar	1–6, 5–7
Loss	2–4	Apr 2011	Tallahassee, USA	Hard	(United Kingdom) James Ward	(Canada) Vasek Pospisil (United States) Bobby Reynolds	2–6, 4–6
Loss	2–5	May 2013	Kunming, China	Hard	(Japan) Yasutaka Uchiyama	(Australia) Sam Groth (Australia) John-Patrick Smith	4–6, 1–6
Loss	2–6	Jun 2014	Nottingham, UK	Grass	(Belgium) Ruben Bemelmans	(Australia) Rameez Junaid (New Zealand) Michael Venus	6–4, 6–7^{(1–7)}, [6–10]
Loss	2–7	Mar 2015	Kyoto, Japan	Hard (i)	(Japan) Yasutaka Uchiyama	(Australia) Benjamin Mitchell (Australia) Jordan Thompson	3–6, 2–6
Loss	2–8	Feb 2016	Kyoto, Japan (2)	Hard (i)	(Japan) Yasutaka Uchiyama	(China) Maoxin Gong (Chinese Taipei) Chu-Huan Yi	3–6, 6–7^{(7–9)}
Loss	2–9	Jul 2017	Granby, Canada	Hard	(Uruguay) Marcel Felder	(United Kingdom) Joe Salisbury (United States) Jackson Withrow	6–4, 3–6, [6–10]
Loss	2–10	Oct 2017	Ho Chi Minh City, Vietnam	Hard	(Japan) Ben McLachlan	(India) Saketh Myneni (India) Vijay Sundar Prashanth	6–7^{(3–7)}, 6–7^{(5–7)}
Loss	2–11	Feb 2018	Kyoto, Japan (3)	Hard (i)	(Japan) Yasutaka Uchiyama	(Australia) Luke Saville (Australia) Jordan Thompson	3–6, 7–5, [6–10]
Loss	2–12	Nov 2018	Kobe, Japan	Hard (i)	(China) Zhe Li	(Portugal) Goncalo Oliveira (Australia) Akira Santillan	6–2, 4–6, [10–12]

== Performance timelines ==
Key
W	F	SF	QF	#R	RR	Q#	P#	DNQ	A	Z#	PO	G	S	B	NMS	NTI	P	NH

(W) winner; (F) finalist; (SF) semifinalist; (QF) quarterfinalist; (#R) rounds 4, 3, 2, 1; (RR) round-robin stage; (Q#) qualification round; (P#) preliminary round; (DNQ) did not qualify; (A) absent; (Z#) Davis/Fed Cup Zonal Group (with number indication) or (PO) play-off; (G) gold, (S) silver or (B) bronze Olympic/Paralympic medal; (NMS) not a Masters tournament; (NTI) not a Tier I tournament; (P) postponed; (NH) not held; (SR) strike rate (events won / competed); (W–L) win–loss record.
To avoid confusion and double counting, these charts are updated at the conclusion of a tournament or when the player's participation has ended.

=== Singles ===
Current through the 2022 Cincinnati Masters.

Tournament	2005	2006	2007	2008	2009	2010	2011	2012	2013	2014	2015	2016	2017	2018	2019	2020	2021	2022	SR	W–L
Grand Slam tournaments
Australian Open	A	Q2	1R	Q1	Q1	Q1	Q1	Q2	2R	1R	2R	Q2	1R	Q3	Q2	Q1	Q1	Q1	0 / 5	2–5
French Open	A	A	A	A	A	A	1R	1R	1R	Q1	1R	Q1	A	Q1	Q3	Q2	Q1	A	0 / 4	0–4
Wimbledon	A	Q1	Q3	Q2	Q2	1R	1R	2R	2R	Q1	1R	Q2	Q2	Q2	Q2	NH	Q1	A	0 / 5	2–5
US Open	A	Q2	Q3	Q1	Q1	Q1	1R	1R	1R	Q1	Q1	Q2	Q3	Q1	Q1	1R	Q2	A	0 / 5	0–4
Win–loss	0–0	0–0	0–1	0–0	0–0	0–1	0–3	1–3	2–3	0–1	1–3	0–0	0–1	0–0	0–0	0–1	0–0	0–0	0/18	4–18
ATP World Tour Masters 1000
Indian Wells Masters	A	A	A	A	A	A	A	A	1R	A	Q1	Q1	Q1	A	A	NH	A	A	0 / 1	0–1
Miami Open	A	A	A	A	A	A	A	A	1R	Q1	1R	A	A	A	A	NH	Q1	A	0 / 2	0–2
Monte-Carlo Masters	A	A	A	A	A	A	A	A	Q1	A	A	A	A	A	A	NH	A	A	0 / 0	0–0
Madrid Open^{1}	A	A	A	A	A	A	A	A	A	A	A	A	A	A	A	NH	A	A	0 / 0	0–0
Italian Open	A	A	A	A	A	A	A	Q1	A	A	A	A	A	A	A	A	A	A	0 / 0	0–0
Canadian Open	A	A	Q1	Q2	A	A	A	A	A	A	A	A	A	A	A	NH	A	A	0 / 0	0–0
Cincinnati Masters	A	A	A	A	A	Q1	A	A	A	A	A	A	A	A	A	A	A	A	0 / 0	0–0
Shanghai Masters^{2}	A	A	A	A	A	Q2	Q1	1R	1R	Q1	1R	A	A	A	A	Not Held			0 / 3	0–3
Paris Masters	A	A	A	A	A	A	A	Q1	A	A	A	A	A	A	A	A	A	A	0 / 0	0–0
Win–loss	0–0	0–0	0–0	0–0	0–0	0–0	0–0	0–1	0–3	0–0	0–2	0–0	0–0	0–0	0–0	0–0	0–0	0–0	0 / 6	0–6
National representation
Davis Cup	Z1	Z1	PO	Z1	Z1	Z1	PO	1R	PO	QF	1R	A	1R	A	A	QR	A	A	0 / 4	24–11
Summer Olympics	Not Held			A	Not Held			1R	Not Held			A	Not Held				A	NH	0 / 1	0–1
ATP Cup	Not Held															RR	A	A	0 / 1	2–1
Career statistics
	2005	2006	2007	2008	2009	2010	2011	2012	2013	2014	2015	2016	2017	2018	2019	2020	2021	2022	Career	
Tournaments	3	3	4	4	4	5	8	19	16	4	13	1	4	0	1	3	0	0	92	
Titles / Finals	0 / 0	0 / 0	0 / 0	0 / 0	0 / 0	0 / 0	0–0	0 / 0	0 / 0	0 / 0	0 / 0	0 / 0	0 / 0	0 / 0	0 / 0	0 / 0	0 / 0	0 / 0	0 / 0	
Overall win–loss	1–2	2–3	4–5	3–4	2–3	3–4	7–7	13–21	9–17	2–4	6–13	0–1	1–3	0–0	1–1	2–4	0–0	0–0	56–92	
Year-end ranking	302	188	206	114	238	120	120	60	103	99	132	126	150	214	121	133	247	607	38%	

^{1} Held as Hamburg Masters (clay) until 2008, Madrid Masters (clay) 2009–present.

^{2} Held as Madrid Masters (indoor hardcourt) from 2002 to 2008, Shanghai Masters (outdoor hardcourt) 2009–present.

=== Doubles ===
Current through the 2022 US Open

Tournament	2005	2006	2007	2008	2009	2010	2011	2012	2013	2014	2015	2016	2017	2018	2019	2020	2021	2022	SR	W–L
Australian Open	A	A	A	A	A	A	A	A	2R	A	A	A	A	A	A	A	A	A	0 / 1	1–1
French Open	A	A	A	A	A	A	A	2R	A	A	A	A	A	A	A	A	A	A	0 / 1	1–1
Wimbledon	A	A	A	Q1	A	A	A	A	A	Q1	A	A	A	A	A	A	A	A	0 / 0	0–0
US Open	A	A	A	A	A	A	A	1R	A	A	A	A	A	A	A	A	A	A	0 / 1	0–1
Win–loss	0–0	0–0	0–0	0–0	0–0	0–0	0–0	1–2	1–1	0–0	0–0	0–0	0–0	0–0	0–0	0–0	0–0	0–0	0 / 3	2–3
National representation																				
Davis Cup	A	A	A	Z1	A	Z1	PO	A	A	A	1R	A	A	A	A	A	A	A	0 / 1	2–2
Summer Olympics	Not Held			A	Not Held			1R	Not Held			A	Not Held				A	NH	0 / 1	0–1
ATP Cup	Not Held															RR	A	A	0 / 1	0–1
Career statistics
	2005	2006	2007	2008	2009	2010	2011	2012	2013	2014	2015	2016	2017	2018	2019	2020	2021	2022	Career	
Tournaments	1	1	1	2	1	2	1	8	4	1	1	0	0	0	0	1	0	0	23	
Titles / Finals	0 / 0	0 / 0	0 / 0	0 / 0	0 / 0	0 / 0	0–0	0 / 0	0 / 0	0 / 0	0 / 0	0 / 0	0 / 0	0 / 0	0 / 0	0 / 0	0 / 0	0 / 0	0 / 0	
Overall win–loss	0–1	0–1	0–1	1–1	1–1	1–2	1–0	2–8	1–4	0–1	0–1	0–0	0–0	0–0	0–0	0–1	0–0	0–0	7–22	
Year-end ranking	726	602	457	400	325	447	470	427	332	461	634	440	450	307	0	965	534		24%	

== Record against other players ==
=== Record against top 10 players ===
Go's record against players who have been ranked in the top 10, with those who are active in boldface. Only ATP Tour main draw, Davis Cup and Olympic matches are considered:

Player	Record	Win %	Hard	Clay	Grass	Carpet	Last match
Number 1 ranked players							
(Spain) **Rafael Nadal**	0–1	0%	0–1	0–0	0–0	0–0	Lost (3–6, 2–6) at 2011 Tokyo
(United States) Andy Roddick	1–0	100%	0–0	1–0	0–0	0–0	Won (7–5, 7–6^{(7–4)}) at 2012 World Team Cup
(United Kingdom) **Andy Murray**	0–1	0%	0–1	0–0	0–0	0–0	Lost (1–6, 1–6, 3–6) at **2014 Australian Open**
(Australia) Lleyton Hewitt	1–0	100%	0–0	1–0	0–0	0–0	Won (4–6, 7–6^{(7–3)}, 6–3) at 2015 Houston
(Serbia) **Novak Djokovic**	0–1	0%	0–1	0–0	0–0	0–0	Lost (3–6, 5–7) at 2019 Tokyo
Number 3 ranked players							
(Croatia) Ivan Ljubičić	0–1	0%	0–1	0–0	0–0	0–0	Lost (4–6, 2–6) at 2006 Beijing
(Argentina) **Juan Martín del Potro**	0–3	0%	0–2	0–0	0–1	0–0	Lost (2–6, 3–6, 6–1, 4–6) at **2012 Wimbledon Championships**
(Switzerland) **Stan Wawrinka**	1–0	100%	1–0	0–0	0–0	0–0	Won (6–4, 6–4) at 2012 Chennai
(Canada) Milos Raonic	0–1	0%	0–1	0–0	0–0	0–0	Lost (4–6, 6–7^{(0–7)}) at 2013 Tokyo
Number 4 ranked players							
(Czech Republic) Tomáš Berdych	0–2	0%	0–1	0–1	0–0	0–0	Lost (1–6, 6–3, 1–6) at 2012 World Team Cup
(Japan) **Kei Nishikori**	1–1	50%	1–1	0–0	0–0	0–0	Lost (6–4, 2–6, 3–6) at 2012 Tokyo
Number 5 ranked players							
(Germany) Rainer Schüttler	1–2	33%	1–2	0–0	0–0	0–0	Won (3–6, 6–4, 6–4) at 2011 Johannesburg
(Chile) Fernando González	0–1	0%	0–1	0–0	0–0	0–0	Lost (6–3, 6–7^{(4–7)}, 1–6) at 2008 Beijing
(Czech Republic) Lukáš Dlouhý	0–1	0%	0–1	0–0	0–0	0–0	Lost (6–3, 2–6, 4–6) at 2009 Chennai
(France) Jo-Wilfried Tsonga	0–3	0%	0–2	0–0	0–1	0–0	Lost (3–6, 6–7^{(1–7)}, 3–6) at **2013 Australian Open**
(South Africa) Kevin Anderson	0–1	0%	0–1	0–0	0–0	0–0	Lost (1–6, 3–6, 0–6) at **2011 US Open**
Number 6 ranked players							
(France) **Gaël Monfils**	0–1	0%	0–1	0–0	0–0	0–0	Lost (6–7^{(10–12)}, 4–6) at 2010 Tokyo
(France) **Gilles Simon**	0–1	0%	0–1	0–0	0–0	0–0	Lost (4–6, 4–6) at 2012 Bangkok
(Italy) **Matteo Berrettini**	0–1	0%	0–1	0–0	0–0	0–0	Lost (6–7^{(5–7)}, 1–6, 4–6) at **2020 US Open**
Number 7 ranked players							
(Croatia) Mario Ančić	0–1	0%	0–1	0–0	0–0	0–0	Lost (4–6, 3–6, 2–6) at **2007 Australian Open**
(France) **Richard Gasquet**	0–2	0%	0–1	0–0	0–1	0–0	Lost (0–6, 3–6, 7–6^{(7–5)}, 3–6) at **2013 Wimbledon Championships**
(United States) Mardy Fish	0–1	0%	0–1	0–0	0–0	0–0	Lost (6–7^{(3–7)}, 6–7^{(2–7)}, 3–6) at **2012 US Open**
(Spain) **Fernando Verdasco**	0–3	0%	0–3	0–0	0–0	0–0	Lost (7–6^{(7–2)}, 3–6, 3–6) at 2016 Tokyo
(Belgium) **David Goffin**	0–1	0%	0–1	0–0	0–0	0–0	Lost (4–6, 2–6) at 2015 Shanghai Masters
Number 8 ranked players							
(Russia) Mikhail Youzhny	0–1	0%	0–0	0–1	0–0	0–0	Lost (5–7, 2–6, 4–6) at **2011 French Open**
(Czech Republic) Radek Štěpánek	0–1	0%	0–0	0–0	0–1	0–0	Lost (1–6, 3–6) at 2011 Queen's Club
(Serbia) Janko Tipsarević	0–2	0%	0–2	0–0	0–0	0–0	Lost (2–6, 4–6) at 2013 Chennai
(Cyprus) Marcos Baghdatis	0–2	0%	0–1	0–0	0–1	0–0	Lost (4–6, 3–6, 1–6) at **2013 US Open**
(United States) **John Isner**	0–2	0%	0–1	0–0	0–1	0–0	Lost (6–7^{(5–7)}, 4–6, 4–6) at **2015 Wimbledon Championships**
(United States) **Jack Sock**	0–1	0%	0–1	0–0	0–0	0–0	Lost (3–6, 4–6) at 2015 Miami Masters
(Italy) **Simone Bolelli**	0–1	0%	0–0	0–0	0–1	0–0	Lost (3–6, 2–6) at 2015 Nottingham
Number 9 ranked players							
(Argentina) Mariano Puerta	0–1	0%	0–0	0–0	0–0	0–1	Lost (4–6, 7–6^{(7–5)}, 4–6) at 2005 Ho Chi Minh
(Spain) Nicolás Almagro	0–1	0%	0–1	0–0	0–0	0–0	Lost (6–7^{(5–7)}, 2–6) at 2013 Shanghai Masters
(Spain) **Roberto Bautista Agut**	0–1	0%	0–1	0–0	0–0	0–0	Lost (2–6, 4–6) at 2020 ATP Cup
**Total**	**5–43**	**10.42%**	**3–33** **(8.33%)**	**2–2** **(50%)**	**0–7** **(0%)**	**0–1** **(0%)**	*** Statistics correct as of 10 October 2022.**

=== Record against players ranked No. 11–20 ===
Active players are in boldface.

- (Romania) Andrei Pavel 0–1
- (United States) Sam Querrey 0–2
- (Russia) Igor Andreev 0–1
- (Russia) Dmitry Tursunov 0–1
- (Croatia) Ivo Karlović 0–1
- (Germany) Philipp Kohlschreiber 0–2
- (Belgium) Xavier Malisse 1–1
- (Spain) **Feliciano López** 0–1
- (Serbia) Viktor Troicki 0–1
- (Ukraine) Alexandr Dolgopolov 1–0

*As of 10 October 2022
