= 2010 Davis Cup Asia/Oceania Zone Group I =

International tennis competition

The Asia/Oceania Zone is one of the three zones of regional Davis Cup competition in 2010.

In the Asia/Oceania Zone there are four different groups in which teams compete against each other to advance to the next group.

== Participating teams ==
=== Seeds ===
1.Australia

2.South Korea

3.Uzbekistan

4.Japan

=== Remaining Nations ===
- Philippines
- China
- Chinese Taipei
- Kazakhstan

== Draw ==
Second round play-offs
Changwon, South Korea (hard)
Philippines	3
2	South Korea	2

First round play-offs
Kaohsiung, Taiwan (outdoor hard)
Chinese Taipei	4
Philippines	1
Gimcheon, South Korea (indoor hard)
3	Uzbekistan	4
2	South Korea	1

First round
Melbourne, Australia (hard)
1	Australia	5
Chinese Taipei	0
Osaka, Japan (indoor carpet)
4	Japan	5
Philippines	0
Guangdong, China (indoor hard)
China	3
3	Uzbekistan	2
Astana, Kazakhstan (indoor clay)
Kazakhstan	5
2	South Korea	0

Second round
Brisbane, Australia (clay)
1	Australia	5
4	Japan	0
Wuhan, China (hard)
China	1
Kazakhstan	4

- South Korea relegated to Group II in 2011.
- Australia and Kazakhstan advance to World Group play-offs.

== First round matches ==
=== Australia vs. Chinese Taipei ===
Australia
5
Margaret Court Arena, Melbourne, Australia
5–7 March 2010
Hard (Plexicushion)

Chinese Taipei
0

			1	2	3	4	5
1	(Australia) (Chinese Taipei)	Bernard Tomic; Yang Tsung-hua	6; 2	6; 1	6; 1
2	(Australia) (Chinese Taipei)	Peter Luczak; Yi Chu-huan	4; 6	6; 3	6; 2	6; 3
3	(Australia) (Chinese Taipei)	Carsten Ball / Paul Hanley; Yang Tsung-hua / Yi Chu-huan	7^{7} 6^{4}	7^{7} 6^{2}	6; 2
4	(Australia) (Chinese Taipei)	Peter Luczak; Yang Tsung-hua	6; 3	6; 3
5	(Australia) (Chinese Taipei)	Bernard Tomic; Lee Hsin-Han	6^{4} 7^{7}	6; 0	6; 3

=== Japan vs. Philippines ===
Japan
5
Namihaya Dome, Osaka, Japan
5–7 March 2010
Hard (Taraflex)

Philippines
0

			1	2	3	4	5
1	(Japan) (Philippines)	Tatsuma Ito; Treat Conrad Huey	3; 6	6; 4	6; 3	3; 6	6; 4
2	(Japan) (Philippines)	Go Soeda; Cecil Mamiit	6^{4} 7^{7}	6; 3	6; 3	6; 3
3	(Japan) (Philippines)	Toshihide Matsui / Takao Suzuki; Treat Conrad Huey / Cecil Mamiit	6; 4	6; 4	6; 3
4	(Japan) (Philippines)	Tatsuma Ito; Cecil Mamiit	6; 4	7^{7} 6^{4}
5	(Japan) (Philippines)	Go Soeda; Francis Casey Alcantara	6; 1	6; 0

=== China vs. Uzbekistan ===
China
3
Huayuan Hotel, Guangdong, China
5–7 March 2010
Hard (acrylic)

Uzbekistan
2

			1	2	3	4	5
1	(China) (Uzbekistan)	Wu Di; Denis Istomin	6; 2	3; 6	5; 7	4; 6
2	(China) (Uzbekistan)	Zhang Ze; Farrukh Dustov	6; 4	0; 6	7; 5	6; 3
3	(China) (Uzbekistan)	Gong Maoxin / Li Zhe; Farrukh Dustov / Denis Istomin	6; 3	6; 3	6; 4
4	(China) (Uzbekistan)	Zhang Ze; Denis Istomin	6; 4	5; 7	2; 6	5; 7
5	(China) (Uzbekistan)	Wu Di; Farrukh Dustov	3; 6	6; 2	6; 3	6; 3

=== Kazakhstan vs. South Korea ===
Kazakhstan
5
The National Tennis Center, Astana, Kazakhstan
5–7 March 2010
Clay

South Korea
0

			1	2	3	4	5
1	(Kazakhstan) (South Korea)	Andrey Golubev; Lim Yong-kyu	6; 1	6; 1	6; 4
2	(Kazakhstan) (South Korea)	Mikhail Kukushkin; Im Kyu-tae	6; 4	7^{11} 6^{9}	7^{7} 6^{5}
3	(Kazakhstan) (South Korea)	Andrey Golubev / Yuri Schukin; Kim Hyun-joon / Seol Jae-min	6^{6} 7^{8}	6; 3	6; 2	6; 4
4	(Kazakhstan) (South Korea)	Andrey Golubev; Kim Hyun-joon	6; 1	6; 1
5	(Kazakhstan) (South Korea)	Mikhail Kukushkin; Lim Yong-kyu	7; 5	6; 4

== Second round matches ==
=== Australia vs. Japan ===
Australia
5
Queensland Tennis Centre, Brisbane, Australia
7–9 May 2010
Clay

Japan
0

			1	2	3	4	5
1	(Australia) (Japan)	Lleyton Hewitt; Tatsuma Ito	6; 3	6; 3	6; 2
2	(Australia) (Japan)	Carsten Ball; Yuichi Sugita	6; 3	6; 4	6; 4
3	(Australia) (Japan)	Paul Hanley / Lleyton Hewitt; Takao Suzuki / Go Soeda	7; 5	6; 4	6; 0
4	(Australia) (Japan)	Lleyton Hewitt; Yuichi Sugita	7; 5	6; 2
5	(Australia) (Japan)	Carsten Ball; Tatsuma Ito	6; 3	7^{8} 6^{6}

=== China vs. Kazakhstan ===
China
1
Hubei Olympic Sports Center, Wuhan, China
7–9 May 2010
Hard

Kazakhstan
4

			1	2	3	4	5
1	(China) (Kazakhstan)	Wu Di; Andrey Golubev	7; 5	4; 6	4; 6	4; 6
2	(China) (Kazakhstan)	Zhang Ze; Mikhail Kukushkin	3; 6	2; 6	2; 6
3	(China) (Kazakhstan)	Gong Maoxin / Li Zhe; Andrey Golubev / Yuri Schukin	6; 3	6; 2
4	(China) (Kazakhstan)	Zhang Ze; Andrey Golubev	2; 6	4; 6	3; 6
5	(China) (Kazakhstan)	Wu Di; Mikhail Kukushkin	3; 6	6; 2	5; 7

== First round play-offs ==
=== Chinese Taipei vs. Philippines ===
Chinese Taipei
4
Yang-Ming Tennis Center, Kaohsiung, Taiwan
9–11 July
Hard

Philippines
1

			1	2	3	4	5
1	(Chinese Taipei) (Philippines)	Yang Tsung-hua; Treat Conrad Huey	6; 3	7^{7} 6^{5}	7^{7} 6^{5}
2	(Chinese Taipei) (Philippines)	Chen Ti; Cecil Mamiit	6; 3	3; 6	1; 4			retired
3	(Chinese Taipei) (Philippines)	Yang Tsung-hua / Yi Chu-huan; Treat Huey / Cecil Mamiit	6; 3	7; 5	6^{3} 7^{7}	7^{8} 6^{6}
4	(Chinese Taipei) (Philippines)	Yang Tsung-hua; Cecil Mamiit	2; 6	6; 3	6; 2	3; 6	6; 3
5	(Chinese Taipei) (Philippines)	Lee Hsin-han; Ruben Gonzales	6; 3	6; 0

=== South Korea vs. Uzbekistan ===
South Korea
1
Gimcheon Total Sports Town Tennis Courts, Gimcheon, South Korea
9–11 July
Hard (indoors)

Uzbekistan
4

			1	2	3	4	5
1	(South Korea) (Uzbekistan)	Lim Yong-kyu; Denis Istomin	6; 4	1; 6	5; 7	2; 6
2	(South Korea) (Uzbekistan)	Kim Young-jun; Farrukh Dustov	7^{8} 6^{6}	5; 7	3; 6	3; 6
3	(South Korea) (Uzbekistan)	Kim Hyun-joon / Kim Young-Jun; Murad Inoyatov / Denis Istomin	7^{8} 6^{6}	5; 7	3; 6	3; 6
4	(South Korea) (Uzbekistan)	Kim Hyun-joon; Murad Inoyatov	7; 5	6; 1
5	(South Korea) (Uzbekistan)	Lim Yong-kyu; Vaja Uzakov	3; 6	1; 6

== Second round play-offs ==
=== Philippines vs. South Korea ===
Philippines
3
Chanwon Municipal Tennis Courts, Changwon, South Korea
17–19 September 2010
Hard

South Korea
2

			1	2	3	4	5
1	(Philippines) (South Korea)	Treat Conrad Huey; Lim Yong-kyu	7^{11} 6^{9}	2; 6	6^{8} 7^{10}	6^{5} 7^{7}
2	(Philippines) (South Korea)	Cecil Mamiit; Jeong Suk-young	6; 0	6; 1	3; 6	0; 6	2; 6
3	(Philippines) (South Korea)	Cecil Mamiit / Treat Conrad Huey; Kim Hyun-joon / Seol Jae-min	6; 3	6; 4	6; 4
4	(Philippines) (South Korea)	Cecil Mamiit; Lim Yong-kyu	3; 6	4; 6	6; 4	1; 1		retired
5	(Philippines) (South Korea)	Treat Conrad Huey; Jeong Suk-young	7; 5	7; 5	6; 3
