= 2008 Davis Cup Asia/Oceania Zone Group I =

International tennis competition

The Asian and Oceanian Zone is one of the three zones of regional Davis Cup competition in 2008.

In the Asian and Oceanian Zone there are four different groups in which teams compete against each other to advance to the next group.

== Participating teams ==
- Australia
- Chinese Taipei
- India
- Japan
- Kazakhstan
- Philippines
- Thailand
- Uzbekistan

== Draw ==
Second-round play-offs
Astana, Kazakhstan (indoor clay)
Kazakhstan	5
Philippines	0

First-round play-offs
Almaty, Kazakhstan (indoor hard)
Chinese Taipei	3
Kazakhstan	2
Manila, Philippines (indoor clay)
Uzbekistan	3
Philippines	2

First Round
Kaohsiung, Taiwan (hard)
1	Australia	4
Chinese Taipei	1
Almaty, Kazakhstan (indoor hard)
3	Thailand	3
Kazakhstan	2
New Delhi, India (grass)
Uzbekistan	2
4	India	3
Manila, Philippines (hard)
Philippines	0
2	Japan	5

Second Round
Townsville, Australia (indoor hard)
1	Australia	5
3	Thailand	0
New Delhi, India (grass)
4	India	3
2	Japan	2

- Philippines relegated to Group II in 2009.
- Australia and India advance to World Group play-off.

== First round ==
=== Chinese Taipei vs. Australia ===
Chinese Taipei
1
Yang-Ming Tennis Center, Kaohsiung, Chinese Taipei
8 – 10 February 2008
Hard

Australia
4

			1	2	3	4	5
1	(Chinese Taipei) (Australia)	Chen Ti; Lleyton Hewitt	4; 6	0; 6	3; 6
2	(Chinese Taipei) (Australia)	Lu Yen-hsun; Chris Guccione	6^{5} 7^{7}	4; 6	6^{9} 7^{11}
3	(Chinese Taipei) (Australia)	Lu Yen-hsun / Jimmy Wang; Paul Hanley / Lleyton Hewitt	6; 2	7^{7} 6^{4}	4; 6	2; 6	2; 6
4	(Chinese Taipei) (Australia)	Yang Tsung-hua; Alun Jones	6; 4	3; 6	2; 6
5	(Chinese Taipei) (Australia)	Chen Ti; Paul Hanley	7^{7} 6^{3}	6; 1

=== Kazakhstan vs. Thailand ===
Kazakhstan
2
Sport Complex Baganashil, Almaty, Kazakhstan
8 – 10 February 2008
Hard (indoor)

Thailand
3

			1	2	3	4	5
1	(Kazakhstan) (Thailand)	Alexey Kedryuk; Danai Udomchoke	6^{8} 7^{10}	1; 6	5; 7
2	(Kazakhstan) (Thailand)	Syrym Abdukhalikov; Weerapat Doakmaiklee	6; 3	6; 4	7^{7} 6^{5}
3	(Kazakhstan) (Thailand)	Syrym Abdukhalikov / Dmitriy Makeyev; Sanchai Ratiwatana / Sonchat Ratiwatana	4; 6	4; 6	2; 6
4	(Kazakhstan) (Thailand)	Syrym Abdukhalikov; Danai Udomchoke	7; 5	4; 6	2; 6	3; 6
5	(Kazakhstan) (Thailand)	Alexey Kedryuk; Weerapat Doakmaiklee	6; 3	6; 2

=== India vs. Uzbekistan ===
India
3
RK Khanna Tennis Stadium, New Delhi, India
8 – 10 February 2008
Grass

Uzbekistan
2

			1	2	3	4	5
1	(India) (Uzbekistan)	Rohan Bopanna; Farrukh Dustov	6; 3	6; 3	6; 1
2	(India) (Uzbekistan)	Somdev Devvarman; Denis Istomin	3; 6	4; 6	2; 6
3	(India) (Uzbekistan)	Mahesh Bhupathi / Rohan Bopanna; Farrukh Dustov / Denis Istomin	6; 3	6; 3	6; 4
4	(India) (Uzbekistan)	Rohan Bopanna; Denis Istomin	6; 4	6; 4	4; 6	6^{1} 7^{7}	6; 8
5	(India) (Uzbekistan)	Prakash Amritraj; Farrukh Dustov	6; 3	3; 6	6; 3	6; 2

=== Philippines vs. Japan ===
Philippines
0
Rizal Memorial Tennis Center, Manila, Philippines
8 – 10 February 2008
Hard

Japan
5

			1	2	3	4	5
1	(Philippines) (Japan)	Patrick-John Tierro; Go Soeda	1; 6	6; 4	2; 6	6; 2	4; 6
2	(Philippines) (Japan)	Cecil Mamiit; Takao Suzuki	5; 7	6^{4} 7^{7}	6; 2	2; 6
3	(Philippines) (Japan)	Cecil Mamiit / Eric Taino; Go Soeda / Takao Suzuki	7^{7} 6^{5}	6^{8} 7^{10}	6^{5} 7^{7}	4; 6
4	(Philippines) (Japan)	Johnny Arcilla; Go Soeda	3; 6	2; 6
5	(Philippines) (Japan)	Eric Taino; Yūichi Sugita	2; 6	3; 6

== Second round ==
=== Australia vs. Thailand ===
Australia
5
Townsville Entertainment and Convention Centre, Townsville, Australia
11 – 13 April 2008
Hard

Thailand
0

			1	2	3	4	5
1	(Australia) (Thailand)	Chris Guccione; Danai Udomchoke	6^{3} 7^{7}	7^{9} 6^{7}	4; 6	7^{8} 6^{6}	7; 5
2	(Australia) (Thailand)	Lleyton Hewitt; Kirati Siributwong	6; 0	6; 0	6; 1
3	(Australia) (Thailand)	Paul Hanley / Lleyton Hewitt; Weerapat Doakmaiklee / Kirati Siributwong	6; 3	6; 1	6; 0
4	(Australia) (Thailand)	Peter Luczak; Danai Udomchoke	6; 4	5; 7	6; 4
5	(Australia) (Thailand)	Chris Guccione; Weerapat Doakmaiklee	6; 2	7^{7} 6^{1}

=== India vs. Japan ===
India
3
RK Khanna Tennis Stadium, New Delhi, India
11 – 13 April 2008
Grass

Japan
2

			1	2	3	4	5
1	(India) (Japan)	Rohan Bopanna; Kei Nishikori	7^{7} 6^{2}	3; 6	6; 4	2; 6	6; 3
2	(India) (Japan)	Prakash Amritraj; Go Soeda	4; 6	6^{5} 7^{7}	6; 4	6; 4	8; 6
3	(India) (Japan)	Mahesh Bhupathi / Leander Paes; Satoshi Iwabuchi / Takao Suzuki	7^{7} 6^{2}	3; 6	6; 3	6; 4
4	(India) (Japan)	Mahesh Bhupathi; Kei Nishikori	5; 7	1; 6
5	(India) (Japan)	Leander Paes; Satoshi Iwabuchi	4; 6	6; 4	4; 6

== First-round play-offs ==
=== Kazakhstan vs. Chinese Taipei ===
Kazakhstan
2
Sport Complex Baganashil, Almaty, Kazakhstan
11 – 13 April 2008
Hard (indoor)

Chinese Taipei
3

			1	2	3	4	5
1	(Kazakhstan) (Chinese Taipei)	Alexey Kedryuk; Lu Yen-hsun	3; 6	5; 7	2; 6
2	(Kazakhstan) (Chinese Taipei)	Yuri Schukin; Chen Ti	3; 6	6; 3	2; 6	6; 4	6; 4
3	(Kazakhstan) (Chinese Taipei)	Alexey Kedryuk / Yuri Schukin; Chen Ti / Lu Yen-hsun	6; 2	6; 3	6^{2} 7^{7}	7; 5
4	(Kazakhstan) (Chinese Taipei)	Yuri Schukin; Lu Yen-hsun	3; 6	4; 6	2; 6
5	(Kazakhstan) (Chinese Taipei)	Alexey Kedryuk; Chen Ti	6^{8} 7^{10}	6; 4	1; 6	6^{4} 7^{7}

=== Philippines vs. Uzbekistan ===
Philippines
2
Philippine Columbian Association, Manila, Philippines
11 – 13 April 2008
Clay (indoor)

Uzbekistan
3

			1	2	3	4	5
1	(Philippines) (Uzbekistan)	Patrick-John Tierro; Denis Istomin	4; 6	2; 6	3; 6
2	(Philippines) (Uzbekistan)	Cecil Mamiit; Farrukh Dustov	5; 7	6; 3	5; 5			retired
3	(Philippines) (Uzbekistan)	Cecil Mamiit / Eric Taino; Farrukh Dustov / Denis Istomin	6^{10} 7^{12}	7; 5	1; 6	6^{4} 7^{7}
4	(Philippines) (Uzbekistan)	Cecil Mamiit; Denis Istomin	3; 6	0; 6	4; 6
5	(Philippines) (Uzbekistan)	Eric Taino; Vaja Uzakov	6; 4	6; 4

== Second-round play-offs ==
=== Kazakhstan vs. Philippines ===
Kazakhstan
5
The National Tennis Centre, Astana, Kazakhstan
19 – 21 September 2008
Clay (indoor)

Philippines
0

			1	2	3	4	5
1	(Kazakhstan) (Philippines)	Yuri Schukin; Cecil Mamiit	6; 0	6; 2	6; 3
2	(Kazakhstan) (Philippines)	Andrey Golubev; Johnny Arcilla	6; 2	6; 1	6; 0
3	(Kazakhstan) (Philippines)	Andrey Golubev / Yuri Schukin; Johnny Arcilla / Cecil Mamiit	7; 5	6; 2	6; 1
4	(Kazakhstan) (Philippines)	Mikhail Kukushkin; Cecil Mamiit	6; 4	4; 6	7^{9} 6^{7}
5	(Kazakhstan) (Philippines)	Syrym Abdukhalikov; Patrick-John Tierro	6^{7} 7^{9}	7; 5	6; 4
