= 2009 Davis Cup Asia/Oceania Zone Group I =

International tennis competition

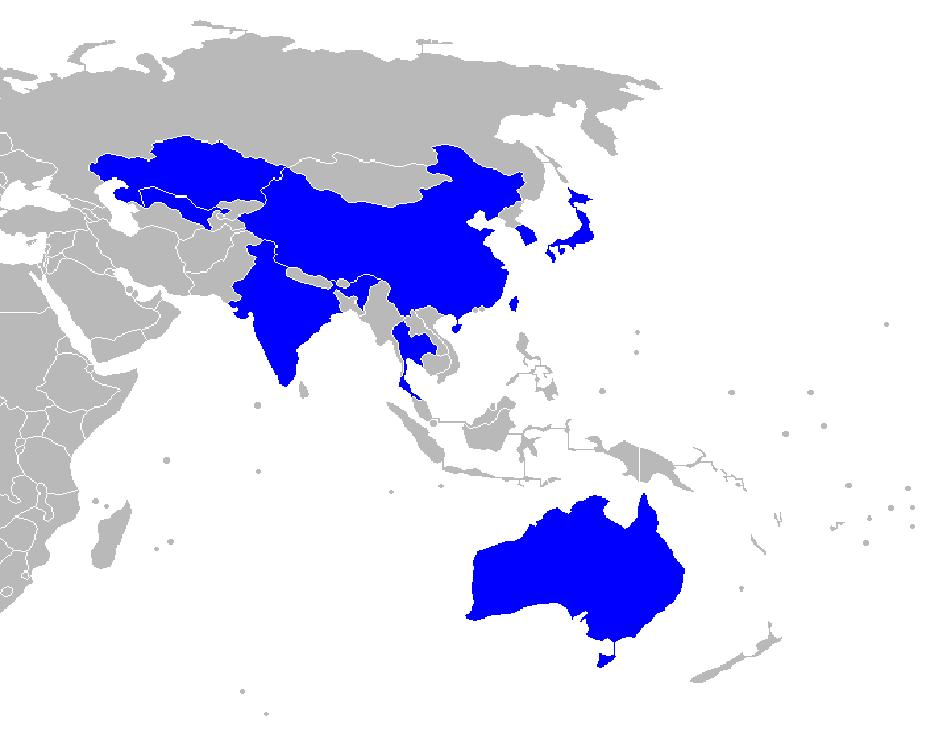
Countries participating in the 2009 Davis Cup Asia/Oceania Zone Group I

The Asian and Oceanian Zone was one the three Group I regional zones that competed in the 2009 Davis Cup competition. The other two zones included the Americas and Europe/Africa.

Within the Asian and Oceanian Zone, nations competed across four different groups in a promotion-relegation format.

== Participating teams in Group I ==
There were nine nations competing in Group I.

- Australia
- China
- Chinese Taipei
- India
- Japan
- Kazakhstan
- South Korea
- Thailand
- Uzbekistan

== Draw ==
Third Round Play-offs
Jiaxing, China (indoor hard)
Thailand	1
China	4

Second Round Play-offs
Nonthaburi, Thailand (hard)
Thailand	0
Kazakhstan	5
Chuncheon City, South Korea (hard)
China	2
2	South Korea	3

First Round Play-offs
bye
Thailand
bye
Kazakhstan
China
bye
bye
2	South Korea

First Round
1	Australia
bye
Thailand
bye
4	India
bye
Taipei County, Chinese Taipei (indoor carpet)
Kazakhstan	1
Chinese Taipei	4
bye
China
bye
3	Japan
bye
Uzbekistan
bye
2	South Korea

Second Round
Nonthaburi, Thailand (hard)
1	Australia	3
Thailand	2
Kaohsiung, Chinese Taipei (hard)
4	India	3
Chinese Taipei	2
Osaka, Japan (indoor carpet)
China	0
3	Japan	5
Namangan, Uzbekistan (indoor clay)
Uzbekistan	4
2	South Korea	1

Third Round
Chennai, India (hard)
1	Australia
4	India	w/o
Namangan, Uzbekistan (indoor clay)
3	Japan	2
Uzbekistan	3

- Thailand relegated to Group II in 2010.
- India and Uzbekistan advanced to World Group play-offs.
  - India automatically advanced to the play-offs by walkover when Australia refused to play at the scheduled site of Chennai due to security concerns.

== First Round Matches ==
=== Kazakhstan vs. Chinese Taipei ===
Kazakhstan
1
Hsinchuang Stadium Taipei County, Taipei, Chinese Taipei
6–8 February 2009
Carpet (indoors)

Chinese Taipei
4

			1	2	3	4	5
1	(Kazakhstan) (Chinese Taipei)	Mikhail Kukushkin; Chen Ti	6^{9} 7^{11}	5; 7	6; 1	7; 5	6; 4
2	(Kazakhstan) (Chinese Taipei)	Andrey Golubev; Wang Yeu-tzuoo	6^{4} 7^{7}	3; 6	2; 6
3	(Kazakhstan) (Chinese Taipei)	Alexey Kedryuk / Yuri Schukin; Yang Tsung-hua / Yi Chu-huan	7^{7} 6^{5}	6^{6} 7^{8}	6^{4} 7^{7}	4; 6
4	(Kazakhstan) (Chinese Taipei)	Yuri Schukin; Chen Ti	6; 4	3; 6	6; 2	6^{3} 7^{7}	1; 6
5	(Kazakhstan) (Chinese Taipei)	Mikhail Kukushkin; Wang Yeu-tzuoo	6; 2	3; 6	3; 6

== Second Round Matches ==
=== Australia vs. Thailand ===
Australia
3
National Tennis Development Center (LTAT), Nonthaburi, Thailand
6–8 March 2009
Hard

Thailand
2

			1	2	3	4	5
1	(Australia) (Thailand)	Lleyton Hewitt; Kittipong Wachiramanowong	6; 3	6; 2	6; 1
2	(Australia) (Thailand)	Brydan Klein; Danai Udomchoke	2; 6	2; 6	5; 7
3	(Australia) (Thailand)	Carsten Ball / Chris Guccione; Sonchat Ratiwatana / Sanchai Ratiwatana	7^{7} 6^{3}	6; 4	6; 4
4	(Australia) (Thailand)	Lleyton Hewitt; Danai Udomchoke	6; 2	6; 4	6^{2} 7^{7}	4; 6	1; 6
5	(Australia) (Thailand)	Chris Guccione; Kittipong Wachiramanowong	6; 3	7; 5	7^{7} 6^{4}

=== India vs. Chinese Taipei ===
India
3
Yang-Ming Tennis Center, Kaohsiung, Chinese Taipei
6–8 March 2009
Hard

Chinese Taipei
2

			1	2	3	4	5
1	(India) (Chinese Taipei)	Somdev Devvarman; Chen Ti	7; 5	6; 4	6; 4
2	(India) (Chinese Taipei)	Rohan Bopanna; Lu Yen-hsun	6^{2} 7^{7}	2; 6	2; 6
3	(India) (Chinese Taipei)	Leander Paes / Mahesh Bhupathi; Yang Tsung-hua / Yi Chu-huan	6; 4	7; 6	6^{2} 7^{7}	6; 2
4	(India) (Chinese Taipei)	Somdev Devvarman; Lu Yen-hsun	6; 1	6; 2	6; 3
5	(India) (Chinese Taipei)	Rohan Bopanna; Yang Tsung-hua	3; 6	7^{8} 6^{6}	6^{5} 7^{7}

=== China vs. Japan ===
China
0
Namihaya Dome, Kadoma, Osaka, Japan
6–8 March 2009
Carpet

Japan
5

			1	2	3	4	5
1	(China) (Japan)	Zeng Shaoxuan; Go Soeda	2; 6	6^{5} 7^{7}	4; 6
2	(China) (Japan)	Zhang Ze; Kei Nishikori	4; 6	5; 7	2; 6
3	(China) (Japan)	Zeng Shaoxuan / Zhang Ze; Satoshi Iwabuchi / Takao Suzuki	2; 6	3; 6	2; 6
4	(China) (Japan)	Wu Di; Takao Suzuki	2; 6	3; 6
5	(China) (Japan)	Zhang Ze; Go Soeda	6; 4	3; 6	2; 6

=== Uzbekistan vs. South Korea ===
Uzbekistan
4
Sport Complex "Pahlavon", Namangan, Uzbekistan
6–8 March 2009
Clay (indoors)

South Korea
1

			1	2	3	4	5
1	(Uzbekistan) (South Korea)	Farrukh Dustov; Lee Hyung-taik	5; 7	6^{9} 7^{11}	4; 6
2	(Uzbekistan) (South Korea)	Denis Istomin; Im Kyu-tae	6; 3	6; 2	6; 4
3	(Uzbekistan) (South Korea)	Farrukh Dustov / Denis Istomin; Im Kyu-tae / Lee Hyung-taik	2; 6	6; 2	3; 6	6; 3	6; 4
4	(Uzbekistan) (South Korea)	Denis Istomin; Lee Hyung-taik	6; 3	1; 6	6; 3	3; 6	6; 3
5	(Uzbekistan) (South Korea)	Murad Inoyatov; Lim Yong-kyu	3; 6	6; 1	6; 3

== Third Round Matches ==
=== India vs. Australia ===
Australia refused to play the tie due to security concerns in Chennai, so India advance to the World Group Playoffs via forfeit.

=== Uzbekistan vs. Japan ===
Uzbekistan
3
Sport Complex "Pahlavon", Namangan, Uzbekistan
8–10 May 2009
Clay (indoors)

Japan
2

			1	2	3	4	5
1	(Uzbekistan) (Japan)	Denis Istomin; Yuichi Sugita	3; 6	2; 6	2; 6
2	(Uzbekistan) (Japan)	Farrukh Dustov; Tatsuma Ito	4; 6	3; 6	6; 3	3; 6
3	(Uzbekistan) (Japan)	Farrukh Dustov / Denis Istomin; Satoshi Iwabuchi / Takao Suzuki	7^{9} 6^{7}	3; 6	6^{3} 7^{7}	6; 4	3; 6
4	(Uzbekistan) (Japan)	Murad Inoyatov; Tatsuma Ito	7^{7} 6^{5}	6; 4
5	(Uzbekistan) (Japan)	Vaja Uzakov; Takao Suzuki	4; 6	6; 3	6; 3

== Second-round play-offs ==
=== Thailand vs. Kazakhstan ===
Thailand
0
National Tennis Development Centre, Nonthaburi, Thailand
10–12 July 2009
Hard

Kazakhstan
5

			1	2	3	4	5
1	(Thailand) (Kazakhstan)	Perakiat Siriluethaiwattana; Andrey Golubev	2; 6	3; 6	2; 6
2	(Thailand) (Kazakhstan)	Kittipong Wachiramanowong; Mikhail Kukushkin	2; 6	4; 6	2; 6
3	(Thailand) (Kazakhstan)	Sanchai Ratiwatana / Sonchat Ratiwatana; Alexey Kedryuk / Yuri Schukin	6; 4	4; 6	6; 4	4; 6	1; 6
4	(Thailand) (Kazakhstan)	Kittipong Wachiramanowong; Andrey Golubev	1; 6	4; 6
5	(Thailand) (Kazakhstan)	Perakiat Siriluethaiwattana; Alexey Kedryuk	6^{6} 7^{8}	6^{6} 7^{8}

=== South Korea vs. China ===
South Korea
3
Chuncheon Tennis Park, Chuncheon City, South Korea
10–12 July 2009
Hard

China
2

			1	2	3	4	5
1	(South Korea) (China)	Im Kyu-tae; Gong Maoxin	6; 3	6; 0	6; 2
2	(South Korea) (China)	Lee Hyung-taik; Zeng Shaoxuan	6; 3	6; 4	6; 2
3	(South Korea) (China)	Im Kyu-tae / Lee Hyung-taik; Zeng Shaoxuan / Ze Zhang	5; 7	6; 3	6^{5} 7^{7}	4; 6
4	(South Korea) (China)	Lim Yong-kyu; Zhang Ze	6; 2	7; 6^{0}	4; 6	6^{7} 7^{9}	0; 2	retired
5	(South Korea) (China)	Im Kyu-tae; Zeng Shaoxuan	6; 0	6; 2	6; 3

== Third-round play-offs ==
=== China vs. Thailand ===
China
4
Jiaxing International Tennis Center, Jiaxing, China
18–20 September 2009
Hard (indoors)

Thailand
1

			1	2	3	4	5
1	(China) (Thailand)	Zeng Shaoxuan; Kittiphong Wachiramanowong	5; 7	6; 1	6; 2	6; 4
2	(China) (Thailand)	Zhang Ze; Danai Udomchoke	3; 6	3; 6	2; 6
3	(China) (Thailand)	Zeng Shaoxuan / Zhang Ze; Sanchai Ratiwatana / Sonchat Ratiwatana	2; 6	4; 6	6; 4	7; 5	6; 2
4	(China) (Thailand)	Zeng Shaoxuan; Danai Udomchoke	2; 6	6; 4	3; 6	6; 1	6; 4
5	(China) (Thailand)	Gong Maoxin; Kittiphong Wachiramanowong	7; 5	3; 6	6; 3
