= 2013 Davis Cup Asia/Oceania Zone Group I =

International tennis competition

The Asia/Oceania Zone is one of the three zones of regional Davis Cup competition in 2013.

In the Asia/Oceania Zone there are four different groups in which teams compete against each other to advance to the next group.

== Participating nations ==
Seeds:

1. Australia
2. Japan
3. Uzbekistan
4. India

Remaining Nations:

- China
- Chinese Taipei
- South Korea
- Indonesia

=== Draw ===
Second Round Play-offs
Chinese Taipei (hard)
Chinese Taipei	5
Indonesia	0

First Round Play-offs
Tianjin, China (hard)
Chinese Taipei	0
China	5
Bangalore, India (hard)
India	5
Indonesia	0

First Round
Kaohsiung City, Taiwan (hard)
1	Australia	5
Chinese Taipei	0
Namangan, Uzbekistan (indoor clay)
3	Uzbekistan	4
China	1
New Delhi, India (hard)
South Korea	4
4	India	1
Tokyo, Japan (indoor hard)
Indonesia	0
2	Japan	5

Second Round
Namangan, Uzbekistan (indoor clay)
1	Australia	3
3	Uzbekistan	1
Tokyo, Japan (indoor hard)
South Korea	2
2	Japan	3

- Indonesia relegated to Group II in 2014.
- Australia and Japan advance to World Group play-offs.

== First round ==
=== Chinese Taipei vs. Australia ===
Chinese Taipei
0
Kaohsiung Yangming Tennis Courts, Kaohsiung City, Chinese Taipei
1–3 February 2013
Hard

Australia
5

			1	2	3	4	5
1	(Chinese Taipei) (Australia)	Yang Tsung-Hua; Lleyton Hewitt	4; 6	4; 6	4; 6
2	(Chinese Taipei) (Australia)	Chen Ti; Matthew Ebden	3; 6	4; 6	5; 7
3	(Chinese Taipei) (Australia)	Lee Hsin-Han / Peng Hsien-Yin; Chris Guccione / Lleyton Hewitt	6^{6} 7^{8}	4; 6	2; 6
4	(Chinese Taipei) (Australia)	Chen Ti; Marinko Matosevic	6^{5} 7^{7}	3; 6
5	(Chinese Taipei) (Australia)	Yang Tsung-Hua; Matthew Ebden	1; 6	2; 6

=== Uzbekistan vs. China ===
Uzbekistan
4
Sport Complex Pahlavon, Namangan, Uzbekistan
1–3 February 2013
Clay (indoor)

China
1

			1	2	3	4	5
1	(Uzbekistan) (China)	Denis Istomin; Wu Di	4; 6	4; 6	7^{7} 6^{4}	7; 5	6; 2
2	(Uzbekistan) (China)	Farrukh Dustov; Zhang Ze	4; 6	7; 6	6; 4	3; 6	6; 4
3	(Uzbekistan) (China)	Farrukh Dustov / Denis Istomin; Gong Maoxin / Li Zhe	6; 3	7^{7} 6^{4}	6; 3
4	(Uzbekistan) (China)	Sarvar Ikramov; Zhang Ze	6; 3	7; 5
5	(Uzbekistan) (China)	Temur Ismailov; Wu Di	0; 6	2; 6

=== India vs. South Korea ===
India
1
R. K. Khanna Tennis Stadium, New Delhi, India
1–3 February 2013
Hard

South Korea
4

			1	2	3	4	5
1	(India) (South Korea)	Ranjeet Virali-Murugesan; Min Hyeok Cho	1; 6	0; 6	1; 6
2	(India) (South Korea)	Vijayant Malik; Suk-Young Jeong	4; 6	5; 7	0^{r} 3
3	(India) (South Korea)	Leander Paes / Purav Raja; Lim Yong-Kyu / Nam Ji Sung	6; 4	7; 5	6; 2
4	(India) (South Korea)	Ranjeet Virali-Murugesan; Suk-Young Jeong	4; 6	4; 6	2; 6
5	(India) (South Korea)	Vijayant Malik; Min Hyeok Cho	2; 6	4; 6

=== Japan vs. Indonesia ===
Japan
5
Ariake Coliseum, Tokyo, Japan
1–3 February 2013
Hard (indoor)

Indonesia
0

			1	2	3	4	5
1	(Japan) (Indonesia)	Tatsuma Ito; Christopher Rungkat	6; 2	6; 2	6; 4
2	(Japan) (Indonesia)	Go Soeda; Wisnu Adi Nugroho	6; 0	6; 0	6; 1
3	(Japan) (Indonesia)	Tatsuma Ito / Yasutaka Uchiyama; Nesa Arta / Elbert Sie	6; 4	5; 7	2; 6	7; 5	6; 2
4	(Japan) (Indonesia)	Yuichi Sugita; Christopher Rungkat	6; 3	6; 1
5	(Japan) (Indonesia)	Yasutaka Uchiyama; Wisnu Adi Nugroho	6; 1	6; 3

== Second round ==
=== Uzbekistan vs. Australia ===
Uzbekistan
1
Sport Complex Pahlavon, Namangan, Uzbekistan
5–7 April 2013
Clay (indoor)

Australia
3

			1	2	3	4	5
1	(Uzbekistan) (Australia)	Farrukh Dustov; Bernard Tomic	6^{6} 7^{8}	4; 6	4; 6
2	(Uzbekistan) (Australia)	Denis Istomin; Marinko Matosevic	6; 4	7; 6	3; 6	6; 4
3	(Uzbekistan) (Australia)	Farrukh Dustov / Denis Istomin; Matthew Ebden / Lleyton Hewitt	5; 7	7^{7} 6^{4}	4; 6	6; 3	3; 6
4	(Uzbekistan) (Australia)	Denis Istomin; Bernard Tomic	6; 4	2; 6	2; 6	3; 6
5	(Uzbekistan) (Australia)	Farrukh Dustov; Marinko Matosevic						not played

=== Japan vs. South Korea ===
Japan
3
Ariake Coliseum, Tokyo, Japan
5–7 April 2013
Hard (indoor)

South Korea
2

			1	2	3	4	5
1	(Japan) (South Korea)	Tatsuma Ito; Suk-Young Jeong	6; 1	6; 4	6; 4
2	(Japan) (South Korea)	Go Soeda; Min Hyeok Cho	5; 7	2; 6	6; 4	6; 4	6; 2
3	(Japan) (South Korea)	Hiroki Moriya / Yasutaka Uchiyama; Lim Yong-Kyu / Nam Ji Sung	5; 7	1; 6	4; 6
4	(Japan) (South Korea)	Go Soeda; Lim Yong-Kyu	7; 5	6; 7	4; 6	3; 6
5	(Japan) (South Korea)	Tatsuma Ito; Min Hyeok Cho	6; 3	6; 3	6; 0

== Play-off ==
=== China vs. Chinese Taipei ===
China
5
Tianjin Tennis Center, Tianjin, China
5–7 April 2013
Hard

Chinese Taipei
0

			1	2	3	4	5
1	(China) (Chinese Taipei)	Wu Di; Chen Ti	1; 6	6; 0	6; 1	6; 4
2	(China) (Chinese Taipei)	Zhang Ze; Yang Tsung-Hua	7; 5	6; 1	6; 1
3	(China) (Chinese Taipei)	Gong Maoxin / Li Zhe; Ting Yu Chuang / Huang Liang-Chi	6; 3	6; 3	4; 6	6; 3
4	(China) (Chinese Taipei)	Zhang Ze; Chen Ti	7^{9} 6^{7}	6; 1
5	(China) (Chinese Taipei)	Wu Di; Liang-Chi Huang	6^{5} 7^{7}	6; 4	6; 1

=== India vs. Indonesia ===
India
5
KSLTA Tennis Stadium, Bangalore, India
5–7 April 2013
Hard

Indonesia
0

			1	2	3	4	5
1	(India) (Indonesia)	Somdev Devvarman; Wisnu Adi Nugroho	6; 1	6; 2	6; 2
2	(India) (Indonesia)	Yuki Bhambri; Christopher Rungkat	6; 3	6; 2	6; 2
3	(India) (Indonesia)	Leander Paes / Sanam Singh; Eibert Sie / David Agung Susanto	6; 1	6; 2	6; 4
4	(India) (Indonesia)	Somdev Devvarman; David Agung Susanto	6; 3	6; 1
5	(India) (Indonesia)	Yuki Bhambri; Wisnu Adi Nugroho	6; 0	6; 1

== Relegation play-off ==
=== Chinese Taipei vs. Indonesia ===
Chinese Taipei
5
Kaohsiung Yangming Tennis Courts, Kaohsiung City, Chinese Taipei
13–15 September 2013
Hard

Indonesia
0

			1	2	3	4	5
1	(Chinese Taipei) (Indonesia)	Liang-Chi Huang; Wisnu Nogroho	6; 0	6; 1	6; 3
2	(Chinese Taipei) (Indonesia)	Chen Ti; Christopher Rungkat	6; 2	6; 3	6; 1
3	(Chinese Taipei) (Indonesia)	Lee Hsin-Han / Peng Hsien-Yin; Elbert Sie / David Susanto	6; 4	6; 2	6; 3
4	(Chinese Taipei) (Indonesia)	Liang-Chi Huang; Christopher Rungkat	2; 6	6; 3	6; 2
5	(Chinese Taipei) (Indonesia)	Chen Ti; David Agung Susanto	6; 3	6; 4
