= 2011 Davis Cup Asia/Oceania Zone Group I =

International tennis competition

The Asia/Oceania Zone is one of the three zones of regional Davis Cup competition in 2011.

In the Asia/Oceania Zone there are four different groups in which teams compete against each other to advance to the next group.

== Participating teams ==
The draw for the 2011 Davis Cup Group I Asia/Oceania Zone was announced on the 21 September 2011.

=== Seeds ===
1. Australia
2. Uzbekistan

=== Remaining Nations ===
- China
- Chinese Taipei
- Japan
- New Zealand
- Philippines

== Draw ==
Second Round Play-offs
Lapu-Lapu City, Philippines (clay)
Chinese Taipei	3
Philippines	2

First Round Play-offs
bye
Chinese Taipei
Hawera, New Zealand (indoor hard)
Philippines	0
New Zealand	5

First Round
1	Australia
bye
Shanghai, China (indoor hard)
Chinese Taipei	2
China	3
Lapu-Lapu City, Philippines (clay)
Philippines	1
Japan	3
Namangan, Uzbekistan (indoor clay)
New Zealand	2
2	Uzbekistan	3

Second Round
Beijing, China (indoor hard)
1	Australia	3
China	1
Kobe, Japan (indoor hard)
Japan	4
2	Uzbekistan	1

- Philippines relegated to Group II in 2012.
- Australia and Japan advance to World Group play-offs.

== First round ==
=== China vs. Chinese Taipei ===
China
3
Shanghai Xianxia Tennis Center, Shanghai, China
4–6 March 2011
Hard (indoors)

Chinese Taipei
2

			1	2	3	4	5
1	(China) (Chinese Taipei)	Gong Maoxin; Yang Tsung-hua	5; 7	6; 1	7^{7} 6^{5}	4; 6	8; 6
2	(China) (Chinese Taipei)	Wu Di; Lu Yen-hsun	6; 4	3; 6	3; 6	7; 5	9; 7
3	(China) (Chinese Taipei)	Gong Maoxin / Li Zhe; Lu Yen-hsun / Yang Tsung-hua	5; 7	4; 6	7^{7} 6^{3}	6^{4} 7^{7}
4	(China) (Chinese Taipei)	Gong Maoxin; Lu Yen-hsun	1; 6	2; 6	2; 6
5	(China) (Chinese Taipei)	Wu Di; Yang Tsung-hua	6; 3	6; 2	2; 6	6; 0

=== Philippines vs. Japan ===
Philippines
1
Plantation Bay Resort & Spa, Lapu-Lapu City, Philippines
4–6 March 2011
Clay

Japan
3

			1	2	3	4	5
1	(Philippines) (Japan)	Cecil Mamiit; Tatsuma Ito	4; 6	7^{7} 6^{5}	3; 6	7^{7} 6^{3}	7; 9
2	(Philippines) (Japan)	Johnny Arcilla; Go Soeda	3; 6	3; 6	3; 6
3	(Philippines) (Japan)	Treat Conrad Huey / Cecil Mamiit; Hiroki Kondo / Takao Suzuki	6; 1	7^{7} 6^{5}	6; 2
4	(Philippines) (Japan)	Cecil Mamiit; Go Soeda	6^{5} 7^{7}	2; 6	6; 3	3; 6
5	(Philippines) (Japan)	Johnny Arcilla; Tatsuma Ito						not played

=== Uzbekistan vs. New Zealand ===
Uzbekistan
3
Sport Complex Pahlavon, Namangan, Uzbekistan
4–6 March 2011
Clay (indoors)

New Zealand
2

			1	2	3	4	5
1	(Uzbekistan) (New Zealand)	Farrukh Dustov; Artem Sitak	6; 0	6; 3	6; 1
2	(Uzbekistan) (New Zealand)	Denis Istomin; Jose Statham	6; 2	6; 3	6; 3
3	(Uzbekistan) (New Zealand)	Farrukh Dustov / Denis Istomin; Marcus Daniell / Michael Venus	7^{7} 6^{5}	6; 3	6; 4
4	(Uzbekistan) (New Zealand)	Murad Inoyatov; Artem Sitak	1; 6	7^{7} 6^{5}	3; 6
5	(Uzbekistan) (New Zealand)	Vaja Uzakov; Michael Venus	3; 6	0; 6

== Second round ==
=== China vs. Australia ===
China
1
Beijing International Tennis Center, Beijing, China
8–10 July 2011
Hard (indoors)

Australia
3

			1	2	3	4	5
1	(China) (Australia)	Wu Di; Marinko Matosevic	4; 6	6; 3	3; 6	6; 4	6; 4
2	(China) (Australia)	Zhang Ze; Bernard Tomic	3; 6	7; 5	4; 6	4; 6
3	(China) (Australia)	Gong Maoxin / Li Zhe; Chris Guccione / Lleyton Hewitt	4; 6	4; 6	4; 6
4	(China) (Australia)	Zhang Ze; Lleyton Hewitt	2; 6	1; 6	6; 4	6^{2} 7^{7}
5	(China) (Australia)	Wu Di; Bernard Tomic						not played

=== Japan vs. Uzbekistan ===
Japan
4
Bourbon Beans Dome, Kobe, Japan
8–10 July 2011
Hard (indoors)

Uzbekistan
1

			1	2	3	4	5
1	(Japan) (Uzbekistan)	Tatsuma Ito; Denis Istomin	4; 6	4; 6	4; 6
2	(Japan) (Uzbekistan)	Kei Nishikori; Farrukh Dustov	6^{2} 7^{7}	6; 3	6; 1			retired
3	(Japan) (Uzbekistan)	Kei Nishikori / Go Soeda; Murad Inoyatov / Denis Istomin	7; 5	7^{7} 6^{5}	7; 5
4	(Japan) (Uzbekistan)	Kei Nishikori; Denis Istomin	6^{5} 7^{7}	7; 5	6; 4	6; 3
5	(Japan) (Uzbekistan)	Go Soeda; Sarvar Ikramov	7; 5	6; 0

== First Playoff Round ==
New Zealand
5
TSB Hub, Hawera, New Zealand
8–10 July 2011
Hard (indoors)

Philippines
0

			1	2	3	4	5
1	(New Zealand) (Philippines)	Jose Rubin Statham; Ruben Gonzales	6; 4	6; 4	6; 4
2	(New Zealand) (Philippines)	Michael Venus; Cecil Mamiit	6^{6} 7^{8}	7^{7} 6^{4}	6; 3	4; 6	6; 3
3	(New Zealand) (Philippines)	Marcus Daniell / Artem Sitak; Ruben Gonzales / Cecil Mamiit	7^{7} 6^{0}	6; 3	6; 2
4	(New Zealand) (Philippines)	Marcus Daniell; Jeson Patrombon	4; 6	6; 3	6; 3
5	(New Zealand) (Philippines)	Artem Sitak; Cecil Mamiit	6; 4	7; 5

== Second Playoff Round ==
=== Chinese Taipei vs. Philippines ===
Chinese Taipei
3
Plantation Bay Resort and Spa, Lapu-Lapu City, Philippines
16–18 September 2011
Clay

Philippines
2

			1	2	3	4	5
1	(Chinese Taipei) (Philippines)	Chen Ti; Cecil Mamiit	7^{7} 6^{2}	2; 6	6^{6} 7^{8}	3; 6
2	(Chinese Taipei) (Philippines)	Jimmy Wang; Treat Conrad Huey	6; 4	6; 4	6; 3
3	(Chinese Taipei) (Philippines)	Lee Hsin-han / Yi Chu-huan; Treat Conrad Huey / Cecil Mamiit	3; 6	6; 4	2; 6	6; 3	8; 6
4	(Chinese Taipei) (Philippines)	Chen Ti; Treat Conrad Huey	6; 3	7^{7} 6^{2}	6; 2
5	(Chinese Taipei) (Philippines)	Jimmy Wang; Jeson Patrombon	6; 1	4; 6	3; 6
