= Japan Davis Cup team =

Davis Cup team representing Japan

Japan
- Captain: Go Soeda
- Nations Ranking: 19 ▲ (21 September 2026)
- Colors: Red & White
- First year: 1921
- Years played: 91
- Ties played (W–L): 206 (114–92)
- Years in World Group: 13 (3–14)
- Runners-up: 1 (1921)
- Most total wins: Takao Suzuki (41–23)
- Most singles wins: Tsuyoshi Fukui (27–12); Takao Suzuki (27–12)
- Most doubles wins: Takao Suzuki (14–11)
- Best doubles team: Satoshi Iwabuchi / Takao Suzuki (9–5)
- Most ties played: Takao Suzuki (31)
- Most years played: Takao Suzuki (15)

The Japan men's national tennis team represents Japan in Davis Cup tennis competition and is governed by the Japan Tennis Association.

Japan first competed at the Davis Cup in 1921, where they finished as runners-up. They were an inaugural member of the World Group in 1981 and competed at the top division until 1985 when they were relegated to the second division. They are currently competing in the World Group for the eighth time.

== History ==
Japan competed in its first Davis Cup in 1921 finishing as the runners-up to the United States.

== Results and fixtures ==
The following are lists of match results and scheduled matches for the current year.

Win Loss Fixture

=== 2025 ===
2025 Davis Cup Qualifiers first round

Japan
3
Bourbon Beans Dome, Miki, Japan
31 January–1 February 2025
Hard (i)

Great Britain
2

			1	2	3
1	(Japan) (United Kingdom)	Yoshihito Nishioka; Billy Harris	7; 5	6; 1
2	(Japan) (United Kingdom)	Kei Nishikori; Jacob Fearnley	3; 6	3; 6
3	(Japan) (United Kingdom)	Yosuke Watanuki / Takeru Yuzuki; Joe Salisbury / Neal Skupski	6^{3} 7^{7}	6^{4} 7^{7}
4	(Japan) (United Kingdom)	Yoshihito Nishioka; Jacob Fearnley	6; 3	7^{7} 6^{0}
5	(Japan) (United Kingdom)	Kei Nishikori; Billy Harris	6; 2	6; 3

2025 Davis Cup Qualifiers second round

Japan
0
Ariake Coliseum, Tokyo, Japan
12–13 September 2025
Hard (i)

Germany
4

			1	2	3
1	(Japan) (Germany)	Yoshihito Nishioka; Jan-Lennard Struff	4; 6	7^{7} 6^{4}	4; 6
2	(Japan) (Germany)	Shintaro Mochizuki; Yannick Hanfmann	3; 6	3; 6
3	(Japan) (Germany)	Yosuke Watanuki / Takeru Yuzuki; Kevin Krawietz / Tim Pütz	3; 6	6^{4} 7^{7}
4	(Japan) (Germany)	Rei Sakamoto; Justin Engel	3; 6	7^{7} 6^{2}	7; 10
5	(Japan) (Germany)	Yoshihito Nishioka; Yannick Hanfmann				not played

=== 2025 ===
2026 Davis Cup Qualifiers first round

Japan
2
Ariake Coliseum, Tokyo, Japan
6–7 February 2026
Hard (i)

Austria
3

			1	2	3
1	(Japan) (Austria)	Yosuke Watanuki; Sebastian Ofner	6; 3	6; 4
2	(Japan) (Austria)	Shintaro Mochizuki; Jurij Rodionov	4; 6	5; 7
3	(Japan) (Austria)	Yosuke Watanuki / Takeru Yuzuki; Alexander Erler / Lucas Miedler	7^{7} 6^{4}	6^{8} 7^{10}	6; 4
4	(Japan) (Austria)	Shintaro Mochizuki; Lukas Neumayer	3; 6	3; 6
5	(Japan) (Austria)	Yoshihito Nishioka; Jurij Rodionov	7; 5	1; 6	0; 6

2026 Davis Cup World Group I

New Zealand
1
Trusts Arena, Auckland, New Zealand
19–20 September 2026
Hard (i)

Japan
3

			1	2	3
1	(New Zealand) (Japan)	Anton Shepp; Rei Sakamoto	5; 7	4; 6
2	(New Zealand) (Japan)	James Watt; Sho Shimabukuro	6; 3	3; 6	4; 6
3	(New Zealand) (Japan)	Ajeet Rai / Finn Reynolds; Yosuke Watanuki / Takeru Yuzuki	7; 5	7^{7} 6^{5}
4	(New Zealand) (Japan)	Anton Shepp; Sho Shimabukuro	3; 6	3; 6
5	(New Zealand) (Japan)	James Watt; Rei Sakamoto				not played

== Players ==
=== Current squad ===
Rankings as of 19 September 2026

Squad representing Japan in the 2026 Davis Cup World Group I
Player	Born	ATP ranking		Debut	Ties	Win-loss		
Player	Born	Singles	Doubles	Debut	Ties	Singles	Doubles	Total
Sho Shimabukuro	30 July 1997 (age 29)	96	1,209	2021	4	4–2	1–0	5–2
Rei Sakamoto	24 June 2006 (age 20)	135	1,129	2025	2	1–1	0–0	1–1
Jay Friend	22 December 2003 (age 22)	254	1,228	2026	0	0–0	0–0	0–0
Yosuke Watanuki	12 April 1998 (age 28)	406	1,343	2018	11	4–2	3–5	7–7
Takeru Yuzuki	22 September 1998 (age 28)	1,374	110	2025	4	0–0	1–3	1–3

== Results ==
Year	Competition	Date	Venue and location	Surface	Opponent	Score	Result
2002	Group I, Asia/Oceania, 1st Round	8–10 February 2002	Gunsan, South Korea	Carpet, Indoor	South Korea	3–2	Won
2002	Group I, Asia/Oceania, 2nd Round	5–7 April 2002	Muang-Thong-Thani Complex, Bangkok, Thailand	Hard, Outdoor	Thailand	1–4	Loss
2003	Group I, Asia/Oceania, 1st Round	7–9 February 2003	R.K. Khanna Tennis Stadium, New Delhi, India	Grass (Grass), Outdoor	India	1–4	Loss
2003	Group I, Asia/Oceania, 1st Round Relegation Play-offs	4–6 April 2003	Toyota City Gymnasium, Toyota, Aichi, Japan	Carpet, Indoor	Pakistan	5–0	Won
2004	Group I, Asia/Oceania, 1st Round	6–8 February 2004	Gelora Bung Karno Tennis Stadium, Jakarta, Indonesia	Hard, Outdoor	Indonesia	3–2	Won
2004	Group I, Asia/Oceania, 2nd Round	9–11 April 2004	Utsubo Tennis Center, Osaka, Japan	Hard, Outdoor	India	3–2	Won
2004	2004 Davis Cup World Group play-offs	24–26 September 2004	Club Naval de Campo Las Salinas, Viña del Mar, Chile	Clay, Outdoor	Chile	0–5	Loss
2005	Group I, Asia/Oceania, 1st Round	4–6 March 2005	(Chinese Taipei) Soleada Club, Taoyuan, Taiwan	Hard (rebound ace), outdoor	Chinese Taipei	2–3	Loss
2005	Group I, Asia/Oceania, 1st Round Relegation Play-offs	15–17 July 2005	Namihaya Dome, Kadoma, Osaka, Japan	Carpet (Taraflex), Indoor	Thailand	4–1	Won
2006	Group I, Asia/Oceania, 1st Round	10–12 February 2006	Namihaya Dome, Kadoma, Osaka, Japan	Carpet (Taraflex), Indoor	China	5–0	Won
2006	Group I, Asia/Oceania, Semifinals	7–9 April 2006	Rama Gardens Hotel, Bangkok, Thailand	Hard (Plexipave), Outdoor	Thailand	2–3	Loss
2007	Group I, Asia/Oceania, 1st Round	9–11 February 2007	Beijing International Tennis Center, Beijing, China	Hard (rebound ace), indoor	China	4–1	Won
2007	Group I, Asia/Oceania, Semifinals	6–8 April 2007	Namihaya Dome, Kadoma, Osaka, Japan	Carpet (Taraflex), Indoor	Thailand	5–0	Won
2007	World Group, play-offs	21–23 September 2007	Namihaya Dome, Kadoma, Osaka, Japan	Carpet (Taraflex), Indoor	Romania	2–3	Loss
2008	Group I, Asia/Oceania, 1st Round	8–10 February 2008	Rizal Memorial Tennis Center, Manila, Philippines	Hard (Truflex Acrylic), Outdoor	Philippines	5–0	Won
2008	Group I, Asia/Oceania, Semifinals	11–13 April 2008	R.K. Khanna Tennis Stadium, New Delhi, India	Grass (Grass), Outdoor	India	2–3	Loss
2009	Group I, Asia/Oceania, 1st Round	6–8 March 2009	Namihaya Dome, Kadoma, Osaka, Japan	Carpet (Taraflex), Indoor	China	5–0	Won
2009	Group I, Asia/Oceania, Semifinals	8–10 May 2009	Sport Complex Pahlavon, Namangan, Uzbekistan	Clay, Indoor	Uzbekistan	2–3	Loss
2010	Group I, Asia/Oceania, 1st Round	5–7 March 2010	Namihaya Dome, Kadoma, Osaka, Japan	Carpet (Taraflex), Indoor	Philippines	5–0	Won
2010	Group I, Asia/Oceania, Semifinals	7–9 May 2010	Queensland Tennis Centre, Brisbane, Australia	Clay, Outdoor	Australia	0–5	Loss
2011	Group I, Asia/Oceania, 1st Round	4–6 March 2011	Plantation Bay Resort & Spa, Lapu-Lapu City, Philippines	Clay, Outdoor	Philippines	3–1	Won
2011	Group I, Asia/Oceania, Semifinals	8–10 July 2011	Bourbon Beans Dome, Miki, Hyōgo, Japan	Hard (Acrylic), Indoor	Uzbekistan	4–1	Won
2011	World Group, play-offs	16–18 September 2011	Ariake Coliseum, Tokyo, Japan	Hard (Deco Turf II), Outdoor	India	4–1	Won
2012	World Group, 1st Round	10–12 February 2012	Bourbon Beans Dome, Miki, Hyōgo, Japan	Hard (DecoTurf), Indoor	Croatia	2–3	Loss
2012	World Group, play-offs	14–16 September 2012	Ariake Coliseum, Tokyo, Japan	Hard (DecoTurf), Outdoor	Israel	2–3	Loss
2013	Group I, Asia/Oceania, 1st Round	1–3 February 2013	Ariake Coliseum, Tokyo, Japan	Hard (DecoTurf), Indoor	Indonesia	5–0	Won
2013	Group I, Asia/Oceania, Semifinals	5–7 April 2013	Ariake Coliseum, Tokyo, Japan	Hard (DecoTurf), Indoor	South Korea	3–2	Won
2013	World Group, play-offs	13–15 September 2013	Ariake Coliseum, Tokyo, Japan	Hard (DecoTurf), Indoor	Colombia	3–2	Won
2014	World Group, 1st Round	31 January–2 February 2014	Ariake Coliseum, Tokyo, Japan	Hard (DecoTurf), Indoor	Canada	4–1	Won
2014	World Group, Quarterfinals	4–6 April 2014	Ariake Coliseum, Tokyo, Japan	Hard (DecoTurf), Indoor	Czech Republic	0–5	Loss
2015	World Group, 1st Round	6–8 March 2015	Doug Mitchell Thunderbird Sports Centre, Vancouver, Canada	Hard (Premier), Indoor	Canada	2–3	Loss
2015	World Group, play-offs	18–20 September 2015	Club Campestre, Pereira, Colombia	Clay (Red Clay), Outdoor	Colombia	3–2	Won
2016	World Group, 1st Round	4–6 March 2016	(United Kingdom) Barclaycard Arena, Birmingham, Great Britain	Hard (GreenSet Cushion), Indoor	Great Britain	1–3	Loss
2016	World Group, play-offs	16–18 September 2016	Utsubo Tennis Center, Osaka, Japan	Hard, Outdoor	Ukraine	5–0	Won
2017	World Group, 1st Round	3–5 February 2017	Ariake Coliseum, Tokyo, Japan	Hard (DecoTurf), Indoor	France	1–4	Loss
2017	World Group, play-offs	15–18 September 2017 (Note: Play postponed on days 2 and 3 due to weather from Typhoon Talim (Lannie))	Utsubo Tennis Center, Osaka, Japan	Hard (DecoTurf), Outdoor	Brazil	3–1	Won
2018	World Group, 1st Round	2–4 February 2018	Morioka Takaya Arena, Morioka, Japan	Hard (GreenSet Pro), Indoor	Italy	1–3	Loss
2018	World Group, play-offs	14–16 September 2018	Utsubo Tennis Center, Osaka, Japan	Hard (DecoTurf), Outdoor	Bosnia and Herzegovina	4–0	Won
2019	Davis Cup qualifying round	1–2 February 2019	Guangdong Olympic Tennis Centre, Guangzhou, China	Hard (TOPLUS MC Pro System), Outdoor	China	3–2	Won
2019	Finals, Round-Robin Group A	19 November 2019	Caja Mágica, Madrid, Spain	Hard, Indoor	France	1–2	Loss
2019	Finals, Round-Robin Group A	20 November 2019	Caja Mágica, Madrid, Spain	Hard, Indoor	Serbia	0–3	Loss
2020–21	Davis Cup qualifying round	6–7 March 2020	Bourbon Beans Dome, Miki, Japan	Hard (DecoTurf), Indoor	Ecuador	0–3	Loss
2020–21	Davis Cup World Group I	5–6 March 2021	Pakistan Sports Complex, Islamabad, Pakistan	Grass, Outdoor	Pakistan	0–4	Won

== See also ==
- Davis Cup
- Japan Billie Jean King Cup team
- Japan at the Hopman Cup
- Japan Tennis Association
