= Weerapat Doakmaiklee =

Thai tennis player

- Country (sports): Thailand
- Born: 13 June 1987 (age 38) Chon Buri, Thailand
- Plays: Right-handed
- Prize money: $36,652

Singles
- Career record: 1–9
- Highest ranking: No. 680 (23 August 2010)

Doubles
- Career record: 1–2
- Highest ranking: No. 319 (8 October 2012)
Medal record
Southeast Asian Games
Gold medal – first place	2007 Nakhon Ratchasima	Team
Bronze medal – third place	2005 Manila	Team
Universiade
Bronze medal – third place	2011 Shenzhen	Mixed doubles

Weerapat Doakmaiklee (born 13 June 1987) is a Thai former professional tennis player.

== Tennis career ==
Born in Chon Buri, Doakmaiklee competed in the Australian Open as a junior and won 11 titles in doubles on the ITF Futures circuit. He reached a career high singles ranking of 680 while competing on the professional tour and was ranked as high as 319 in doubles.

Between 2007 and 2012 he appeared in a total of seven ties for the Thailand Davis Cup team. This includes a 2008 tie against Australia in Townsville, where he played a doubles rubber against Lleyton Hewitt.

Doakmaiklee was member of the gold medal winning men's team at the 2007 Southeast Asian Games, then in 2011 won a mixed doubles bronze medal at the University Games in Shenzhen. He has also represented Thailand at the Asian Games.
