= Wang Yu (tennis) =

Chinese tennis player

- Full name: Wang Yu Jr.
- Country (sports): China
- Born: 1 August 1981 (age 43); Tianjin, China
- Plays: Left-handed
- Prize money: $78,868

Singles
- Career record: 1–5 (ATP Tour)
- Highest ranking: No. 309 (2 August 2004)

Doubles
- Career record: 1–5 (ATP Tour)
- Highest ranking: No. 417 (13 November 2006)

Wang Yu (born 1 August 1981) is a Chinese former professional tennis player.

A left-handed player from Tianjin, Wang had a career high singles ranking of 309 on the professional tour and was a Chinese number one. His best performance in an ATP Tour tournament came at the 2005 China Open, where he won in the first round, against Luka Gregorc.

Wang won a silver medal for China partnering Xie Yanze in mixed doubles at the 2003 University Games in Daegu and was also an Asian Games representative player. At Davis Cup level, Wang was a regular fixture in the national side between 2000 and 2006, featuring in a total of 12 ties. He won six singles and one doubles rubber.
