= Towa Pharmaceutical Ractab Dome =

Sporting arena in Kadoma, Osaka, Japan

Coordinates: 34°42′57″N 135°35′39″E

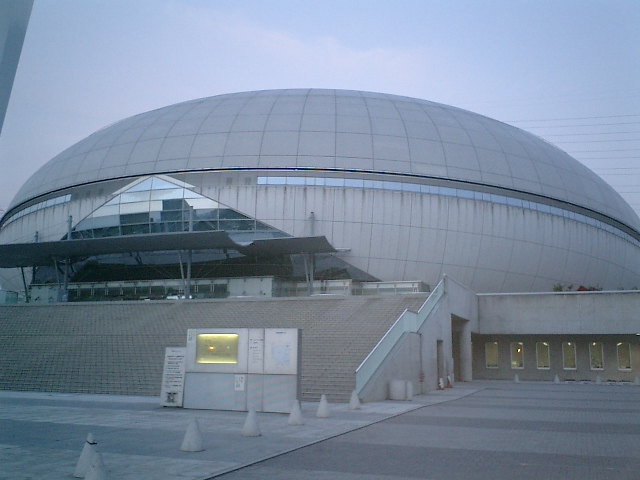
- Interactive map of Towa Pharmaceutical Ractab Dome
- Full name: Osaka Prefectural Kadoma Sports Center
- Address: Kadoma, Osaka
- Capacity: 6,000

Construction
- Opened: 1996

Towa Pharmaceutical Ractab Dome (東和薬品RACTABドーム, Tōwa Yakuhin Ractab Dōmu) is an indoor sporting arena located in Kadoma city in the Osaka Prefecture of Japan.

Construction was completed in early 1996. The primary architect was Mamoru Kawaguchi, founder of the firm Kawaguchi & Engineers. The dome is composed largely of reinforced concrete and aluminum frames and covers an area of approximately 25,000 m^{2}. Inside is a main competition arena plus a separate swimming pool, training room, multipurpose hall, conference rooms and Restaurant Namihaya. The main arena has 6,000 fixed seats with a possible capacity for 10,000 people. There is a large screen display and a large electrical score screen.

== Main Arena uses ==
The purpose of the arena changes with the seasons.

- In summer, the arena has a swimming pool, 50 m by 25.5 m, where the depth can be changed due to a movable floor. The diving pool, 25 m by 25 m, with three diving platforms and five springboards, also has a movable floor.
- In winter, the arena has ice skating rinks. The main rink is 60 m by 30 m, and a sub rink is 18 m by 30 m.
- In autumn and spring, the arena is transformed to a gymnasium where sporting competitions, exhibitions and conferences are held.

== Sporting events ==
- In 2005, the final competition of six international events, the 2005 NHK Trophy was held at the dome for the ISU Grand Prix of Figure Skating.
- Some games of the 2003 Women's Volleyball World Cup were held at the dome.
- Some games of the national tennis matches, Davis Cup have been held at the dome.
- Japan Figure Skating Championships 2001–02, 2009–10, and 2007–08.
