= Sun Peng =

Chinese tennis player

Sun Peng 孙鹏
- Country (sports): China
- Residence: Tianjin, China
- Born: 19 October 1983 (age 43) Liaoning, China
- Height: 1.84 m (6 ft 0 in)
- Plays: Right-handed (two-handed backhand)
- Prize money: US$69,629

Singles
- Career record: 8-16
- Highest ranking: No. 290 (25 July 2005)

Other tournaments
- Olympic Games: 1R (2008)

Doubles
- Career record: 0-1
- Highest ranking: No. 670 (2 August 2004)
- Last updated on: 21 January 2012.

Sun Peng (Chinese: 孙鹏; born October 19, 1983) is a Chinese tennis player. He was the national singles champion in 2005.

Peng and Zeng Shaoxuan were the only male singles competitors for China at the 2008 Summer Olympics.

== See also ==
- Tennis in China
