= Chinese Taipei Davis Cup team =

National tennis team

Chinese Taipei
- Captain: Chang Hsiao-Yung
- ITF ranking: 32 ▼4 (09 February 2026)
- Colors: White & Blue
- First year: 1972
- Years played: 52
- Ties played (W–L): 100 (48 - 52)
- Years in World Group: 5 (3 - 3)
- Davis Cup titles: 0
- Best finish: Qualifiers (2024)
- Most total wins: Jimmy Wang (24 - 13)
- Most singles wins: Jimmy Wang (19 - 7)
- Most doubles wins: Lien Yu-Hui (9 - 8)
- Best doubles team: Hsu Huang-Jung / Wu Chang-Rung (5 - 8)
- Most ties played: Chen Ti (24)
- Most years played: Chen Ti (15)

The Chinese Taipei men's national tennis team represents Taiwan in Davis Cup tennis competition and are governed by the Chinese Taipei Tennis Association.

Chinese Taipei will compete in the Davis Cup Qualifiers in 2024.

== History ==
Chinese Taipei competed in its first Davis Cup in 1972. Formerly They had achieved Asia/Oceania Zone Group I second round in 2005, 2006 and 2009. After the new World Group format introduced, Chinese Taipei had won four straight ties since 2022 and will compete in 2024 Qualifiers for the first time.

== Results and fixtures ==
The following are lists of match results and scheduled matches for the current year.

Win Loss Fixture

=== 2026 ===
Chinese Taipei
3
Taipei Tennis Center, Taipei, Chinese Taipei
7–8 February 2025
Hard

Lebanon
1

			1	2	3
1	(Chinese Taipei) (Lebanon)	Wu Tung-lin; Hady Habib	6; 3	6; 2
2	(Chinese Taipei) (Lebanon)	Huang Tsung-hao; Benjamin Hassan	4; 6	4; 6
3	(Chinese Taipei) (Lebanon)	Hsieh Cheng-peng / Huang Tsung-hao; Benjamin Hassan / Hasan Ibrahim	7^{8} 6^{6}	6; 3
4	(Chinese Taipei) (Lebanon)	Wu Tung-lin; Benjamin Hassan	6; 3	6; 4
5	(Chinese Taipei) (Lebanon)	Huang Tsung-hao; Hady Habib				not played

== 2026 ==
=== World Group I ===
- Wu Tung-Lin (Singles – ATP #373; Doubles – ATP #1436)
- Huang Tsung-Hao (Singles – ATP #493; Doubles – ATP #160)
- Lee Kuan-Yi (Singles – ATP #625; Doubles – ATP #1250)
- Chen Yan Cheng (Singles – ATP #1331; Doubles – ATP #1519)
- Hsieh Cheng-Peng (Doubles – ATP #376)

== 2025 ==
=== World Group I ===
- Ray Ho (Singles – ATP #1116; Doubles – ATP #112)
- Huang Tsung-Hao (Singles – ATP #702; Doubles – ATP #321)
- Tseng Chun-Hsin (Singles – ATP #98)
- Wu Tung-Lin (Singles – ATP #263; Doubles – ATP #694)
- Hsu Yu-Hsiou (Singles – ATP #235; Doubles – ATP #272)

== 2024 ==
=== World Group I ===
- Jason Jung (Singles – ATP #256; Doubles – ATP #644)
- Wu Tung-Lin (Singles – ATP #270; Doubles – ATP #1046)
- Tseng Chun-Hsin (Singles – ATP #245; Doubles – ATP #1141)
- Hsu Yu-Hsiou (Singles – ATP #232; Doubles – ATP #390)

== 2023 ==
=== World Group I ===
- Hsu Yu-Hsiou (Singles – ATP #180; Doubles – ATP #232)
- Huang Tsung-Hao (Singles – ATP #584; Doubles – ATP #377)
- Jason Jung (Singles – ATP #232; Doubles – ATP #692)
- Tseng Chun-Hsin (Singles – ATP #326; Doubles – ATP #1127)
- Wu Tung-Lin (Singles – ATP #182; Doubles – ATP #426)

=== World Group I, Playoffs ===
- Hsu Yu-Hsiou (Singles – ATP #180; Doubles – ATP #232)
- Huang Tsung-Hao (Singles – ATP #584; Doubles – ATP #377)
- Jason Jung (Singles – ATP #232; Doubles – ATP #692)
- Tseng Chun-Hsin (Singles – ATP #326; Doubles – ATP #1127)
- Wu Tung-Lin (Singles – ATP #182; Doubles – ATP #426)

== 2022 ==
=== World Group II ===
- Wu Tung-Lin (Singles – ATP #204; Doubles – ATP #249)
- Tseng Chun-Hsin (Singles – ATP #90; Doubles – ATP #369)
- Jason Jung (Singles – ATP #166; Doubles – ATP #422; Doubles – ATP #1303)

== 2021 ==
=== World Group I, Play-offs ===
- Wu Tung-Lin (Singles – ATP #267; Doubles – ATP #620)
- Tseng Chun-Hsin (Singles – ATP #250; Doubles – ATP #440)
- Yang Tsun-Hua (Singles – ATP #515; Doubles – ATP #330)
- Hsieh Cheng-Peng (Doubles – ATP #200)
- Lin Han-Chih

== 2019 ==
=== Group II ===
- Jason Jung (Singles – ATP #166; Doubles – ATP #625)
- Wu Tung-Lin (Singles – ATP #267; Doubles – ATP #620)
- Yang Tsun-Hua (Singles – ATP #515; Doubles – ATP #330)
- Tseng Chun-Hsin (Singles – ATP #250; Doubles – ATP #440)
- Hsieh Cheng-Peng (Doubles – ATP #200)

== 2018 ==
=== Group II ===
- Chen Ti (Singles – ATP #1333; Doubles – ATP #1429)
- Lee Kuan-Yi (Singles – ATP #948; Doubles – ATP #1351)
- Yu Cheng-Yu (Singles – ATP #1096; Doubles – ATP #1543)
- Tseng Chun-Hsin (Singles – ATP #250; Doubles – ATP #440)

=== Group II, Play-offs ===
- Jason Jung (Singles – ATP #166; Doubles – ATP #625)
- Yang Tsun-Hua (Singles – ATP #515; Doubles – ATP #330)
- Hsu Yu-Hsiou (Singles – ATP #365; Doubles – ATP #259)
- Hsieh Cheng-Peng (Doubles – ATP #200)
- Peng Hsien-Yin

== 2017 ==
=== Group I ===
- Jason Jung (Singles – ATP #166; Doubles – ATP #625)
- Chen Ti (Singles – ATP #1333; Doubles – ATP #1429)
- Lee Kuan-Yi (Singles – ATP #948; Doubles – ATP #1351)
- Peng Hsien-Yin

=== Group I play-offs ===
- Jason Jung (Singles – ATP #166; Doubles – ATP #625)
- Chen Ti (Singles – ATP #1333; Doubles – ATP #1429)
- Wu Tung-Lin (Singles – ATP #267; Doubles – ATP #620)
- Yu Cheng-Yu (Singles – ATP #1096; Doubles – ATP #1543)

== 2016 ==
=== Group II, First Round ===
- Lu Yen-Hsun (Singles – ATP #572; Doubles – ATP #541)
- Huang Liang-Chi
- Hung Jui-Chen
- Yi Chu-Huan

=== Group II, Semi Final ===
- Chen Ti (Singles – ATP #1333; Doubles – ATP #1429)
- Huang Liang-Chi
- Hung Jui-Chen
- Wang Chieh-Fu

=== Group II, Final ===
- Yang Tsun-Hua (Singles – ATP #515; Doubles – ATP #330)
- Lee Kuan-Yi (Singles – ATP #948; Doubles – ATP #1351)
- Hung Jui-Chen
- Wang Chieh-Fu

== 2015 ==
=== Group II ===
- Lu Yen-Hsun (Singles – ATP #572; Doubles – ATP #541)
- Hung Jui-Chen
- Wang Chieh-Fu
- Ho Chih-Jen

=== Group II, Semi Final ===
- Lu Yen-Hsun (Singles – ATP #572; Doubles – ATP #541)
- Hung Jui-Chen
- Peng Hsien-Yin
- Lee Hsin-Han

=== Group II, Final ===
- Jimmy Wang (tennis) (Doubles – ATP #1343)
- Hung Jui-Chen
- Peng Hsien-Yin
- Wang Chieh-Fu

== 2014 ==
=== Group I ===
- Yang Tsun-Hua (Singles – ATP #515; Doubles – ATP #330)
- Chen Ti (Singles – ATP #1333; Doubles – ATP #1429)
- Peng Hsien-Yin
- Lee Hsin-Han

=== Group I, Play-offs Semi Final ===
- Chen Ti (Singles – ATP #1333; Doubles – ATP #1429)
- Hung Jui-Chen
- Wang Chieh-Fu
- Peng Hsien-Yin

=== Group I, Play-offs Final ===
- Yang Tsun-Hua (Singles – ATP #515; Doubles – ATP #330)
- Hung Jui-Chen
- Wang Chieh-Fu
- Peng Hsien-Yin

== See also ==
- Davis Cup
- Chinese Taipei Billie Jean King Cup team
- Chinese Taipei at the Hopman Cup
