= China Davis Cup team =

National tennis team of China

China
- Other names: People's Republic of China
- Captain: Zeng Shaoxuan
- ITF ranking: 70 ▼6 (20 September 2022)
- Colors: red & white
- First year: 1924
- Years played: 36
- Ties played (W–L): 78 (36-42)
- Years in World Group: 0 (0-0)
- Best finish: WG Play-off (1990); EAS final (1987)
- Most total wins: Xia Jiaping (29-18)
- Most singles wins: Xia Jiaping (20-12)
- Most doubles wins: Zeng Shaoxuan (12-6)
- Best doubles team: Pan Bing / Xia Jiaping (7-2)
- Most ties played: Zeng Shaoxuan (18)
- Most years played: Xia Jiaping (9)

The China men's national tennis team represents the People's Republic of China in Davis Cup tennis competition and are governed by the Chinese Tennis Association. It was represented by the Republic of China from 1924-1946. The team did not participate between 1946-1983, and in 1983 the People's Republic of China competed for the first time.

China currently competes in the Asia/Oceania Zone of Group I. They have never competed in the World Group, but reached the Play-offs in 1990 and also reached the Eastern Zone final in 1987.

== Current team (2022) ==
- Zhang Zhizhen
- Wu Yibing
- Bu Yunchaokete
- Li Hanwen
- Te Rigele

== History ==
China competed in its first Davis Cup in 1924.

== See also ==
- Davis Cup
- China Billie Jean King Cup team
- China at the Hopman Cup
- Tennis in China
