= 2008 ITF Men's Circuit =

Details

Achievements (singles)

The 2008 ITF Men's Circuit was the 2008 edition of the third-tier tour for men's professional tennis. It was organised by the International Tennis Federation and is a tier below the ATP Challenger Tour. The ITF Men's Circuit consisted of 534 'Futures' tournaments played year round across six continents, with prize money ranging from $10,000 to $15,000.

== Futures events ==
$15,000 tournaments
$10,000 tournaments

=== January ===
Tournament	Date	City	Surface	Singles champions	Doubles champions
Spain F1 Futures $10,000	January 7	Menorca; Spain	Clay	(Spain) Javier Genaro-Martinez	(France) Julien Jeanpierre (France) Xavier Pujo
Germany F1 Futures $15,000	January 7	Nussloch; Germany	Carpet (i)	(Slovakia) Karol Beck	(Netherlands) Fred Hemmes (Netherlands) Michel Koning
USA F1 Futures $10,000	January 7	Wesley Chapel, Florida; USA	Hard	(India) Somdev Devvarman	(India) Somdev Devvarman (Philippines) Treat Huey
El Salvador F1 Futures $10,000	January 7	Santa Tecla, El Salvador; El Salvador	Clay	(Italy) Leonardo Azzaro	(Italy) Leonardo Azzaro (Italy) Pietro Fanucci
Austria F1 Futures $10,000	January 14	Bergheim; Austria	Carpet (i)	(Italy) Massimo Dell'Acqua	(Poland) Marcin Gawron (Poland) Błażej Koniusz
Portugal F1 Futures $10,000	January 14	Albufeira; Portugal	Hard	(Romania) Teodor-Dacian Crăciun	(Canada) Érik Chvojka (Ukraine) Denys Molchanov
Spain F2 Futures $10,000	January 14	Mallorca; Spain	Clay	(Spain) Carles Poch Gradin	(France) Julien Jeanpierre (France) Xavier Pujo
Germany F2 Futures $10,000	January 14	Stuttgart; Germany	Hard (i)	(Germany) Stefan Seifert	(Switzerland) Alexander Sadecky (South Africa) Izak van der Merwe
Great Britain F1 Futures $10,000	January 14	Sunderland; Great Britain	Hard (i)	(United Kingdom) Richard Bloomfield	(United Kingdom) Richard Bloomfield (United Kingdom) Ken Skupski
USA F2 Futures $10,000	January 14	North Miami Beach, Florida; USA	Hard	(Belarus) Uladzimir Ignatik	(United States) Christopher Lam (United States) Chris Wettengel
Guatemala F1 Futures $10,000	January 14	Guatemala; Guatemala	Hard	(Canada) Peter Polansky	(Mexico) Antonio Ruiz-Rosales (United States) Matthew Roberts
China F1 Futures $15,000	January 14	Shenzhen; China P.R.	Hard	(Andorra) Laurent Recouderc	(China) Yu Xinyuan (China) Zeng Shaoxuan
France F1 Futures $10,000	January 21	Deauville; France	Clay (i)	(Belgium) Niels Desein	(Belgium) Niels Desein (France) Alexandre Renard
Austria F2 Futures $10,000	January 21	Bergheim; Austria	Carpet (i)	(Germany) Peter Gojowczyk	(Italy) Andrea Stoppini (Italy) Tomas Tenconi
Portugal F2 Futures $10,000	January 21	Albufeira; Portugal	Hard	(Romania) Victor Ioniță	(Sweden) Robert Gustafsson (Sweden) Rickard Holmstrom
Spain F3 Futures $10,000	January 21	Mallorca; Spain	Clay	(Poland) Adam Chadaj	(Spain) Pablo Santos (Spain) Juan-Miguel Such-Perez
Germany F3 Futures $10,000	January 21	Kaarst; Germany	Carpet (i)	(Belgium) Jeroen Masson	(Czech Republic) Dušan Karol (Belgium) Jeroen Masson
Great Britain F2 Futures $10,000	January 21	Sheffield; Great Britain	Hard (i)	(France) Adrian Mannarino	(Czech Republic) Jiří Krkoška (India) Purav Raja
USA F3 Futures $10,000	January 21	Boca Raton, Florida; USA	Hard	(Portugal) Gastão Elias	(Belarus) Uladzimir Ignatik (Russia) Andrey Kumantsov
Colombia F1 Futures $15,000	January 21	Manizales; Colombia	Clay	(Argentina) Diego Veronelli	(Brazil) André Miele (Brazil) João Souza
Costa Rica F1 Futures $10,000	January 21	San Jose; Costa Rica	Hard	(Uruguay) Marcel Felder	(Australia) Nima Roshan (United Kingdom) Edward Seator
China F2 Futures $15,000	January 21	Dongguan; China P.R.	Hard	(France) David Guez	(Italy) Paolo Lorenzi (Italy) Giancarlo Petrazzuolo
France F2 Futures $10,000	January 28	Feucherolles; France	Hard (i)	(France) Jean-Christophe Faurel	(Monaco) Thomas Oger (France) Ludovic Walter
Austria F3 Futures $10,000	January 28	Bergheim; Austria	Carpet (i)	(Germany) Peter Gojowczyk	(Croatia) Antonio Šančić (Croatia) Vilim Visak
Portugal F3 Futures $10,000	January 28	Albufeira; Portugal	Hard	(Romania) Victor Ioniță	(Romania) Teodor-Dacian Crăciun (Romania) Victor Ioniță
Spain F4 Futures $10,000	January 28	Murcia; Spain	Clay	(Spain) Pablo Santos	(Spain) Bartolomé Salvá Vidal (Portugal) João Sousa
Germany F4 Futures $15,000	January 28	Mettmann; Germany	Carpet (i)	(Germany) Simon Greul	(Germany) Dustin Brown (Sweden) Daniel Danilović
Great Britain F3 Futures $10,000	January 28	Tipton; Great Britain	Hard (i)	(France) Grégoire Burquier	(Czech Republic) Jiří Krkoška (India) Purav Raja
Colombia F2 Futures $15,000	January 28	Bucaramanga; Colombia	Clay	(Brazil) João Souza	(Colombia) Michael Quintero (Colombia) Carlos Salamanca
Panama F1 Futures $10,000	January 28	Panama; Panama	Clay	(Italy) Leonardo Azzaro	(Italy) Leonardo Azzaro (Italy) Pietro Fanucci
Mexico F2 Futures $15,000	January 28	Naucalpan; Mexico	Hard	(Moldova) Roman Borvanov	(Mexico) Juan Manuel Elizondo (Mexico) Santiago González

=== February ===
Tournament	Date	City	Surface	Singles champions	Doubles champions
France F3 Futures $10,000	February 4	Bressuire; France	Hard (i)	(France) Mathieu Rodrigues	(France) Olivier Charroin (France) Clément Reix
Spain F5 Futures $10,000	February 4	Murcia; Spain	Clay	(France) Nicolas Coutelot	(Bulgaria) Grigor Dimitrov (Spain) Carles Poch Gradin
Germany F5 Futures $10,000	February 4	Schwieberdingen; Germany	Carpet (i)	(Germany) Simon Greul	(Germany) Dustin Brown (Switzerland) Alexander Sadecky
Australia F1 Futures $15,000	February 4	Mildura, Victoria; Australia	Grass	(United Kingdom) Brydan Klein	(Australia) Sam Groth (Australia) Nathan Healey
Mexico F3 Futures $10,000	February 4	Tuxtla Gutiérrez; Mexico	Hard	(Brazil) Ricardo Hocevar	(Canada) Chris Klingemann (United States) Ross Wilson
Italy F1 Futures $10,000	February 11	Bari; Italy	Clay (i)	(Portugal) Rui Machado	(Italy) Alberto Brizzi (Italy) Matteo Volante
Spain F6 Futures $10,000	February 11	Torre Pacheco; Spain	Clay	(France) Nicolas Coutelot	(Netherlands) Romano Frantzen (Netherlands) Stephan Fransen
Croatia F1 Futures $15,000	February 11	Zagreb; Croatia	Hard (i)	(Croatia) Franko Škugor	(United Kingdom) Chris Eaton (Estonia) Mait Künnap
Australia F2 Futures $15,000	February 11	Berri; Australia	Grass	(Australia) Raphael Durek	(Australia) Raphael Durek (Australia) Rameez Junaid
Cuba F1 Futures $10,000	February 11	La Habana; Cuba	Hard	(Brazil) Ricardo Hocevar	(Russia) Sergei Demekhine (Belarus) Pavel Katliarov
Thailand F1 Futures $10,000	February 11	Nonthaburi; Thailand	Hard	(Japan) Tatsuma Ito	(New Zealand) Matt Simpson (New Zealand) Rubin Statham
Italy F2 Futures $15,000	February 18	Trento; Italy	Hard (i)	(Italy) Paolo Lorenzi	(Italy) Paolo Lorenzi (Italy) Giancarlo Petrazzuolo
Spain F7 Futures $10,000	February 18	Cartagena; Spain	Clay	(Spain) Pablo Santos	(Spain) Carles Poch Gradin (Spain) Gabriel Trujillo Soler
Croatia F2 Futures $15,000	February 18	Zagreb; Croatia	Hard (i)	(Czech Republic) Pavel Šnobel	(Croatia) Ivan Cinkus (Croatia) Nikola Martinovic
USA F4 Futures $15,000	February 18	Brownsville, Texas; USA	Hard	(United Kingdom) Jamie Baker	(Russia) Pavel Chekhov (United States) Phillip Simmonds
Cuba F2 Futures $10,000	February 18	La Habana; Cuba	Hard	(Colombia) Michael Quintero	(Venezuela) Piero Luisi (Venezuela) Roberto Maytín
Thailand F2 Futures $10,000	February 18	Laksi; Thailand	Hard	(Germany) Sebastian Rieschick	(Indonesia) Christopher Rungkat (United States) Nathan Thompson
India F1 Futures $15,000	February 18	Kolkata; India	Clay	(Germany) Alexander Satschko	(India) Vijay Kannan (Kazakhstan) Alexey Kedryuk
Nigeria F1 Futures $15,000	February 18	Benin City; Nigeria	Hard	(France) Jeremy Blandin	(Republic of Ireland) John McGahon (United Kingdom) Edward Seator
Switzerland F1 Futures $10,000	February 25	Leuggern; Switzerland	Hard (i)	(Italy) Andrea Stoppini	(Germany) Dustin Brown (Austria) Armin Sandbichler
Portugal F4 Futures $10,000	February 25	Faro; Portugal	Hard	(Portugal) Rui Machado	(Netherlands) Fred Hemmes (Netherlands) Michel Koning
Italy F3 Futures $10,000	February 25	Castel Gandolfo; Italy	Clay	(Slovenia) Janez Semrajc	(Czech Republic) Dušan Karol (Russia) Mikhail Vasiliev
Spain F8 Futures $10,000	February 25	Terrassa; Spain	Clay	(Spain) Pere Riba	(Spain) Pere Riba (Spain) Gabriel Trujillo Soler
USA F5 Futures $15,000	February 25	Harlingen, Texas; USA	Hard	(United Kingdom) Jamie Baker	(United States) Nicholas Monroe (United States) Phillip Simmonds
New Zealand F1 Futures $15,000	February 25	Wellington; New Zealand	Hard	(Australia) Colin Ebelthite	(Australia) Andrew Coelho (United Kingdom) Brydan Klein
Thailand F3 Futures $10,000	February 25	Nonthaburi; Thailand	Hard	(China) Bai Yan	(Indonesia) Christopher Rungkat (United States) Nathan Thompson
India F2 Futures $15,000	February 25	Delhi; India	Hard	(Germany) Alexander Satschko	(India) Ashutosh Singh (India) Vivek Shokeen
Nigeria F2 Futures $15,000	February 25	Benin City; Nigeria	Hard	(France) Jeremy Blandin	(Nigeria) Abdul-Mumin Babalola (Nigeria) Lawal Shehu
Morocco F1 Futures $15,000	February 25	Oujda; Morocco	Clay	(Belgium) Jeroen Masson	(Belgium) Niels Desein (Belgium) Jeroen Masson

=== March ===
Tournament	Date	City	Surface	Singles champions	Doubles champions
Switzerland F2 Futures $10,000	March 3	Bassersdorf; Switzerland	Carpet (i)	(Belgium) Ruben Bemelmans	(Sweden) Carl Bergman (Sweden) Henrik Norfeldt
Portugal F5 Futures $10,000	March 3	Lagos; Portugal	Hard	(Portugal) Rui Machado	(Australia) Carsten Ball (United Kingdom) Chris Eaton
Spain F9 Futures $10,000	March 3	Sabadell; Spain	Clay	(Spain) Gorka Fraile	(Spain) Miquel Perez Puigdomenech (Spain) Sergio Pérez Pérez
USA F6 Futures $15,000	March 3	McAllen, Texas; USA	Hard	(New Zealand) Artem Sitak	(Belarus) Sergey Betov (Lithuania) Ričardas Berankis
New Zealand F2 Futures $15,000	March 3	Hamilton; New Zealand	Hard	(United Kingdom) Brydan Klein	(Australia) Nathan Healey (New Zealand) Mikal Statham
Morocco F2 Futures $15,000	March 3	Rabat; Morocco	Clay	(Romania) Adrian Cruciat	(Morocco) Rabie Chaki (Morocco) Reda El Amrani
Canada F1 Futures $10,000	March 3	Gatineau; Canada	Hard (i)	(Canada) Érik Chvojka	(Canada) Milan Pokrajac (Canada) Milos Raonic
Ivory Coast F1 Futures $15,000	March 3	Abidjan; Côte d'Ivoire	Hard	(Serbia) Darko Mađarovski	(Russia) Ilya Belyaev (Russia) Sergei Krotiouk
Italy F3B Futures $10,000	March 3	Eur; Italy	Clay	(Italy) Leonardo Azzaro	(Italy) Mirko Nasoni (Sweden) Filip Prpic
France F4 Futures $15,000	March 10	Lille; France	Hard (i)	(France) Clément Reix	(Monaco) Thomas Oger (France) Nicolas Tourte
Switzerland F3 Futures $10,000	March 10	Vaduz; Liechtenstein	Carpet (i)	(Poland) Jerzy Janowicz	(Latvia) Deniss Pavlovs (Finland) Juho Paukku
Portugal F6 Futures $10,000	March 10	Albufeira; Portugal	Hard	(Portugal) Rui Machado	(United Kingdom) Neil Bamford (United Kingdom) Josh Goodall
Italy F4 Futures $15,000	March 10	Caltanissetta; Italy	Clay	(Italy) Gianluca Naso	(Argentina) Juan-Martín Aranguren (Argentina) Juan-Francisco Spina
Spain F10 Futures $10,000	March 10	Badalona; Spain	Clay	(Spain) Bartolomé Salvá Vidal	(Brazil) Marcelo Demoliner (United Kingdom) David Rice
Croatia F3 Futures $10,000	March 10	Poreč; Croatia	Clay	(Slovenia) Grega Žemlja	(Serbia) David Savić (Croatia) Vilim Visak
Australia F3 Futures $15,000	March 10	Perth, Western Australia; Australia	Hard	(Australia) Colin Ebelthite	(Australia) Adam Feeney (Australia) Sam Groth
Canada F2 Futures $10,000	March 10	Montreal; Canada	Hard (i)	(Netherlands) Martin Verkerk	(United States) Rylan Rizza (United States) Travis Rettenmaier
Ivory Coast F2 Futures $15,000	March 10	Abidjan; Côte d'Ivoire	Hard	(Netherlands) Matwé Middelkoop	(Ukraine) Denys Molchanov (Netherlands) Boy Westerhof
France F5 Futures $15,000	March 17	Poitiers; France	Hard (i)	(Italy) Andrea Stoppini	(Belgium) Ruben Bemelmans (Belgium) Stefan Wauters
Turkey F1 Futures $10,000	March 17	Antalya; Turkey	Clay	(Spain) Jordi Marse-Vidri	(Czech Republic) Dušan Karol (Belgium) Jeroen Masson
Spain F11 Futures $10,000	March 17	Castelldefels; Spain	Clay	(Morocco) Younes El Aynaoui	(Spain) David Ollivier-Baquero (Spain) Carlos Rexach-Itoiz
Croatia F4 Futures $10,000	March 17	Rovinj; Croatia	Clay	(Monaco) Jean-René Lisnard	(Switzerland) Michael Lammer (Italy) Marco Pedrini
Great Britain F4 Futures $10,000	March 17	Bath; Great Britain	Hard (i)	(United Kingdom) Josh Goodall	(United Kingdom) Neil Bamford (United Kingdom) Josh Goodall
Australia F4 Futures $15,000	March 17	Sorrento, Western Australia; Australia	Hard	(Australia) Colin Ebelthite	(Australia) Miles Armstrong (Australia) Matthew Ebden
Japan F1 Futures $10,000	March 17	Nishitama; Japan	Hard	(Japan) Tatsuma Ito	(Japan) Hiroki Kondo (Japan) Hiroyasu Sato
Egypt F1 Futures $15,000	March 17	Cairo; Egypt	Clay	(Romania) Victor Crivoi	(Argentina) Juan-Martín Aranguren (Argentina) Alejandro Fabbri
Canada F3 Futures $10,000	March 17	Sherbrooke; Canada	Hard (i)	(Italy) Enrico Iannuzzi	(Canada) Daniel Chu (Canada) Adil Shamasdin
India F3 Futures $10,000	March 17	Mumbai; India	Hard	(United States) Nathan Thompson	(India) Rohan Gajjar (India) Purav Raja
Egypt F2 Futures $15,000	March 24			(Romania) Victor Crivoi	(Egypt) Mahmoud Ezz (Egypt) Omar Hedayet
India F4 Futures $10,000	March 24			(United States) Nathan Thompson	(Chinese Taipei) Lee Hsin-han (China) Wang Yu
Turkey F2 Futures $10,000	March 24	Antalya; Turkey	Clay	(Belgium) Jeroen Masson	(Romania) Gabriel Moraru (Romania) Andrei Mlendea
Italy F6 Futures $10,000	March 24	Monterotondo; Italy	Clay	(Italy) Tomas Tenconi	(North Macedonia) Lazar Magdinčev (North Macedonia) Predrag Rusevski
Spain F12 Futures $10,000	March 24	Zaragoza; Spain	Clay (i)	(Spain) Pere Riba	(Spain) Guillermo Olaso (Spain) Albert Ramos Viñolas
Japan F2 Futures $10,000	March 24	Nishitama; Japan	Hard	(Japan) Gouichi Motomura	(New Zealand) G.D. Jones (New Zealand) Daniel King-Turner
Croatia F5 Futures $10,000	March 24	Vrsar; Croatia	Clay	(Monaco) Jean-René Lisnard	(Italy) Thomas Fabbiano (Italy) Marco Pedrini
Great Britain F5 Futures $10,000	March 24	St Peter, Jersey; Great Britain	Hard (i)	(Poland) Dawid Olejniczak	(Germany) Ralph Grambow (United Kingdom) Ken Skupski
Great Britain F6 Futures $10,000	March 31	Exmouth; Great Britain	Carpet (i)	(United Kingdom) Josh Goodall	(Finland) Harri Heliövaara (Finland) Henri Kontinen
Turkey F3 Futures $10,000	March 31	Antalya; Turkey	Clay	(Moldova) Andrei Gorban	(Germany) Dustin Brown (Germany) Peter Steinberger
Italy F7 Futures $10,000	March 31	Frascati; Italy	Clay	(North Macedonia) Predrag Rusevski	(Argentina) Jonathan Gonzalia (Argentina) Juan-Pablo Villar
Japan F3 Futures $10,000	March 31	Kofu; Japan	Hard	(Japan) Yaoki Ishii	(China) Gong Maoxin (China) Li Zhe
Spain F13 Futures $10,000	March 31	Loja; Spain	Clay	(Portugal) Rui Machado	(Spain) Pedro Clar (Spain) Guillermo Olaso
India F5 Futures $10,000	March 31	Chandigarh; India	Hard	(India) Harsh Mankad	(India) Harsh Mankad (India) Rupesh Roy

=== April ===
Tournament	Date	City	Surface	Singles champions	Doubles champions
France F6 Futures $15,000	April 7	Angers; France	Clay (i)	(France) Alexandre Sidorenko	(Germany) Philipp Marx (Germany) Lars Uebel
Russia F1 Futures $15,000	April 7	Moscow; Russia	Carpet (i)	(Kazakhstan) Mikhail Kukushkin	(Russia) Sergei Demekhine (Russia) Konstantin Kravchuk
Italy F8 Futures $15,000	April 7	Bergamo; Italy	Clay	(France) Mathieu Montcourt	(Argentina) Jonathan Gonzalia (Argentina) Leandro Migani
Spain F14 Futures $15,000	April 7	Málaga; Spain	Clay	(Spain) Gorka Fraile	(Spain) Marc Fornell Mestres (United Kingdom) David Rice
USA F7 Futures $15,000	April 7	Mobile, Alabama; USA	Hard	(United States) Travis Rettenmaier	(Switzerland) Alexander Sadecky (South Africa) Izak van der Merwe
USA F8 Futures $15,000	April 14	Little Rock, Arkansas; USA	Hard	(New Zealand) Artem Sitak	(Barbados) Haydn Lewis (The Bahamas) Bjorn Munroe
China F3 Futures $15,000	April 14	Taizhou; China P.R.	Hard	(China) Gong Maoxin	(Hong Kong) Karan Rastogi (India) Ashutosh Singh
France F7 Futures $15,000	April 14	Grasse; France	Clay	(France) Nicolas Coutelot	(France) Franck Dalla-Santa (France) Xavier Pujo
Russia F2 Futures $15,000	April 14	Tyumen; Russia	Carpet (i)	(Russia) Pavel Chekhov	(Russia) Danila Arsenov (Russia) Evgeny Donskoy
Turkey F4 Futures $10,000	April 14	Antalya; Turkey	Clay	(Romania) Gabriel Moraru	(Egypt) Karim Maamoun (Egypt) Sherif Sabry
Italy F9 Futures $10,000	April 14	Francavilla; Italy	Clay	(Italy) Thomas Fabbiano	(Brazil) Andre Pinheiro (Brazil) Fernando Romboli
Spain F15 Futures $10,000	April 14	Melilla; Spain	Hard	(Germany) Gero Kretschmer	(Spain) Sergio Gutiérrez Ferrol (United Kingdom) David Rice
Spain F16 Futures $10,000	April 21	Reus; Spain	Clay	(Spain) Javier Genaro-Martinez	(Spain) Pedro Clar (Spain) David Canudas-Fernandez
Turkey F5 Futures $10,000	April 21	Antalya; Turkey	Clay	(Moldova) Andrei Gorban	(Egypt) Karim Maamoun (Egypt) Sherif Sabry
Italy F10 Futures $15,000	April 21	Padova; Italy	Clay	(Croatia) Antonio Veić	(Italy) Simone Vagnozzi (Brazil) Caio Zampieri
China F4 Futures $15,000	April 21	Taizhou; China P.R.	Hard	(China) Li Zhe	(Chinese Taipei) Lin Tzu-yang (Chinese Taipei) Yi Chu-huan
Mexico F4 Futures $15,000	April 21	Córdoba, Veracruz; Mexico	Hard	(United States) Nicholas Monroe	(United Kingdom) Neil Bamford (United Kingdom) Josh Goodall
Brazil F1 Futures $10,000	April 21	Ribeirão Preto; Brazil	Clay	(Brazil) Ricardo Hocevar	(Argentina) Martín Alund (Argentina) Gaston-Arturo Grimolizzi
Brazil F2 Futures $10,000	April 28	Itu; Brazil	Clay	(Brazil) Rogério Dutra Silva	(Brazil) Alexandre Bonatto (Brazil) Rafael Camilo
USA F9 Futures $10,000	April 28	Vero Beach, Florida; USA	Clay	(United States) Chase Buchanan	(United States) Marcus Fugate (United States) Lance Vodicka
Colombia F3 Futures $15,000	April 28	Pereira; Colombia	Clay	(Colombia) Michael Quintero	(Ecuador) Jean-Michel Durango (Ecuador) Iván Endara
Mexico F5 Futures $10,000	April 28	Guadalajara; Mexico	Clay	(Mexico) Víctor Romero	(New Zealand) G.D. Jones (Australia) Nima Roshan
Korea Rep. F1 Futures $15,000	April 28	Gimcheon; Korea Rep.	Hard	(Japan) Tatsuma Ito	(Kazakhstan) Alexey Kedryuk (Hong Kong) Karan Rastogi
Turkey F6 Futures $10,000	April 28	Antalya; Turkey	Clay	(France) Jonathan Eysseric	(Hungary) György Balázs (Hungary) Attila Balázs
Italy F11 Futures $10,000	April 28	Aosta; Italy	Clay	(Italy) Stefano Ianni	(Chile) Guillermo Hormazábal (Chile) Hans Podlipnik Castillo
Spain F17 Futures $10,000	April 28	Lleida; Spain	Clay	(Germany) Alexander Flock	(Spain) Agustin Boje-Ordonez (Spain) Pablo Martin-Adalia
Great Britain F7 Futures $15,000	April 28	Bournemouth; Great Britain	Clay	(Republic of Ireland) Conor Niland	(United Kingdom) Ken Skupski (France) Ludovic Walter
Romania F1 Futures $10,000	April 28	Bucharest; Romania	Clay	(Romania) Răzvan Sabău	(Romania) Teodor-Dacian Crăciun (Romania) Victor Ioniță

=== May ===
Tournament	Date	City	Surface	Singles champions	Doubles champions
Italy F12 Futures $15,000	May 5	Vicenza; Italy	Clay	(Italy) Giancarlo Petrazzuolo	(Ecuador) Carlos Avellán (Chile) Jorge Aguilar
Spain F18 Futures $10,000	May 5	Vic; Spain	Clay	(Spain) Javier Genaro-Martinez	(Spain) Íñigo Cervantes (Spain) David Díaz-Ventura
Great Britain F8 Futures $15,000	May 5	Edinburgh; Great Britain	Clay	(Italy) Alessandro Da Col	(United Kingdom) Dan Evans (United Kingdom) Joshua Milton
Bulgaria F1 Futures $10,000	May 5	Sofia; Bulgaria	Clay	(Bulgaria) Ivaylo Traykov	(Romania) Bogdan Leonte (Italy) Luca Vanni
Greece F1 Futures $10,000	May 5	Kos; Greece	Hard	(Italy) Riccardo Ghedin	(Sweden) Daniel Danilović (Latvia) Kārlis Lejnieks
Bosnia & Herzegovina F1 Futures $10,000	May 5	Doboj; Bosnia and Herzegovina	Clay	(Serbia) Aleksander Slovic	(Latvia) Deniss Pavlovs (Montenegro) Goran Tošić
Romania F2 Futures $10,000	May 5	Bucharest; Romania	Clay	(Russia) Sergei Demekhine	(Romania) Artemon Apostu-Efremov (Romania) Adrian Gavrilă
Hungary F1 Futures $10,000	May 5	Mogyoród; Hungary	Clay	(Hungary) György Balázs	(Hungary) György Balázs (Hungary) Attila Balázs
Czech Rep. F1 Futures $10,000	May 5	Teplice; Czech Republic	Clay	(Czech Republic) Roman Jebavý	(Czech Republic) Roman Jebavý (Czech Republic) Filip Zeman
Korea Rep. F2 Futures $15,000	May 5	Changwon; Korea Rep.	Hard	(Australia) Matthew Ebden	(South Korea) Kim Young-jun (South Korea) Lee Seung-hoon
Uzbekistan F1 Futures $15,000	May 5	Andijan; Uzbekistan	Hard	(Russia) Konstantin Kravchuk	(Russia) Alexandre Krasnoroutskiy (Russia) Andrey Kumantsov
Mexico F6 Futures $10,000	May 5	Celaya; Mexico	Hard	(Mexico) Víctor Romero	(United States) Ikaika Jobe (United States) Bryan Wooten
Colombia F4 Futures $15,000	May 5	Barranquilla; Colombia	Clay	(Colombia) Michael Quintero	(Ecuador) Julio César Campozano (Argentina) Alejandro Kon
Argentina F1 Futures $10,000	May 5	Reconquista; Argentina	Clay	(Argentina) Andrés Molteni	(Argentina) Facundo Bagnis (Argentina) Agustin Picco
USA F10 Futures $10,000	May 5	Orange Park, Florida; USA	Clay	(Australia) Greg Jones	(Germany) Thomas Schoeck (United States) Ross Wilson
Brazil F3 Futures $10,000	May 5	São Roque; Brazil	Clay	(Brazil) Rogério Dutra Silva	(Bolivia) Mauricio Doria-Medina (Brazil) Rodrigo-Antonio Grilli
Brazil F4 Futures $15,000	May 12	Caldas Novas; Brazil	Hard	(Uruguay) Marcel Felder	(Brazil) Marcelo Demoliner (Brazil) André Miele
USA F11 Futures $10,000	May 12	Tampa; USA	Clay	(Mexico) Daniel Garza	(United States) Adam Fass (United States) Vahid Mirzadeh
Argentina F2 Futures $10,000	May 12	Argentina	Clay	(Argentina) Martín Alund	(Argentina) Guillermo Bujniewicz (Argentina) Nicolas Jara-Lozano
Mexico F7 Futures $10,000	May 12	Morelia; Mexico	Hard	(Australia) Marinko Matosevic	(New Zealand) G.D. Jones (Australia) Nima Roshan
Uzbekistan F2 Futures $15,000	May 12	Namangan; Uzbekistan	Hard	(Turkey) Marsel İlhan	(Chinese Taipei) Chen Ti (Germany) Sebastian Rieschick
Korea Rep. F3 Futures $15,000	May 12	Daegu; Korea Rep.	Hard	(Japan) Satoshi Iwabuchi	(South Korea) Kim Young-jun (South Korea) Kwon Oh-hee
Italy F13 Futures $15,000	May 12	Averno; Italy	Clay	(Portugal) Rui Machado	(Argentina) Diego Álvarez (Argentina) Lionel Noviski
Spain F19 Futures $10,000	May 12	Balaguer; Spain	Clay	(Spain) David Díaz-Ventura	(Spain) Agustin Boje-Ordonez (Spain) Pablo Martin-Adalia
Bulgaria F2 Futures $10,000	May 12	Rousse; Bulgaria	Clay	(Belgium) Maxime Authom	(Romania) Bogdan Leonte (Russia) Mikhail Vasiliev
Poland F1 Futures $15,000	May 12	Katowice; Poland	Clay	(Spain) Guillermo Olaso	(Poland) Marcin Gawron (Poland) Grzegorz Panfil
Greece F2 Futures $10,000	May 12	Heraklio; Greece	Carpet	(United Kingdom) Ken Skupski	(Greece) Paris Gemouchidis (Greece) Alexandros Jakupovic
Bosnia & Herzegovina F2 Futures $10,000	May 12	Sarajevo; Bosnia and Herzegovina	Clay	(Croatia) Luka Belić	(Russia) Alexei Filenkov (Italy) Claudio Grassi
Romania F3 Futures $10,000	May 12	Pitești; Romania	Clay	(Romania) Victor Ioniță	(Russia) Ilya Belyaev (Russia) Sergei Krotiouk
Hungary F2 Futures $10,000	May 12	Gödöllő; Hungary	Clay	(Hungary) György Balázs	(Israel) Amir Hadad (Belgium) Stefan Wauters
Czech Rep. F2 Futures $10,000	May 12	Most; Czech Republic	Clay	(Czech Republic) Karel Triska	(Czech Republic) Roman Jebavý (Czech Republic) Filip Zeman
Italy F14 Futures $15,000	May 19	Parma; Italy	Clay	(Brazil) Daniel Dutra da Silva	(Bulgaria) Todor Enev (Finland) Juho Paukku
Spain F20 Futures $10,000	May 19	Valldoreix; Spain	Clay	(Bulgaria) Grigor Dimitrov	(Spain) Pedro Clar (Spain) Carlos Rexach-Itoiz
Bulgaria F3 Futures $10,000	May 19	Pleven; Bulgaria	Clay	(Belgium) Yannick Mertens	(Belgium) Yannick Mertens (Serbia) Miljan Zekić
Poland F2 Futures $10,000	May 19	Zabrze; Poland	Clay	(Poland) Grzegorz Panfil	(Chile) Guillermo Hormazábal (Chile) Hans Podlipnik Castillo
Bosnia & Herzegovina F3 Futures $10,000	May 19	Brčko; Bosnia and Herzegovina	Clay	(Croatia) Nikola Mektić	(Serbia) David Savić (Croatia) Vilim Visak
Romania F4 Futures $10,000	May 19	Bucharest; Romania	Clay	(Romania) Teodor-Dacian Crăciun	(Russia) Sergei Demekhine (Belarus) Pavel Katliarov
Hungary F3 Futures $10,000	May 19	Budapest; Hungary	Clay	(Italy) Matteo Viola	(Slovenia) Martin Rmus (Slovenia) Tadej Turk
Czech Rep. F3 Futures $10,000	May 19	Jablonec nad Nisou; Czech Republic	Clay	(Czech Republic) Jaroslav Pospíšil	(Canada) Érik Chvojka (Czech Republic) Jaroslav Pospíšil
Greece F3 Futures $10,000	May 19	Kalamata; Greece	Hard	(Switzerland) Robin Roshardt	(United Kingdom) Neil Bamford (United Kingdom) Matthew Illingworth
Korea Rep. F4 Futures $15,000	May 19	Seogwipo; Korea Rep.	Hard	(South Korea) Dylan Seong Kwan Kim	(Japan) Yaoki Ishii (Japan) Hiroki Kondo
Kuwait F1 Futures $15,000	May 19	Mishref; Kuwait	Hard	(Kuwait) Mohammad Ghareeb	(Kuwait) Mohammad Ghareeb (Sweden) Johan Örtegren
Mexico F8 Futures $10,000	May 19	Puerto Vallarta, Jalisco; Mexico	Hard (i)	(Australia) Marinko Matosevic	(United States) Mason Fuller (United States) Ikaika Jobe
Argentina F3 Futures $10,000	May 19	Chaco; Argentina	Clay	(Argentina) Pablo Galdón	(Argentina) Martín Alund (Argentina) Gaston-Arturo Grimolizzi
Brazil F5 Futures $15,000	May 19	Uberlândia; Brazil	Clay	(Uruguay) Marcel Felder	(Bolivia) Mauricio Doria-Medina (Brazil) Rodrigo-Antonio Grilli
Brazil F6 Futures $15,000	May 26	Brasília; Brazil	Clay	(Brazil) André Miele	(Brazil) Rafael Camilo (Brazil) Rodrigo Guidolin
Kuwait F2 Futures $15,000	May 26	Mishref; Kuwait	Hard	(Australia) Miles Armstrong	(Australia) Leon Frost (India) Navdeep Singh
Italy F15 Futures $15,000	May 26	Cesena; Italy	Clay	(Belgium) Ruben Bemelmans	(Belgium) Ruben Bemelmans (Argentina) Horacio Zeballos
Spain F21 Futures $10,000	May 26	Maspalomas; Spain	Clay	(Spain) David Díaz-Ventura	(Spain) David Díaz-Ventura (Spain) Pablo Santos
Bulgaria F4 Futures $10,000	May 26	Sofia; Bulgaria	Clay	(Belgium) Yannick Mertens	(Bulgaria) Tihomir Grozdanov (Bulgaria) Simeon Ivanov
Poland F3 Futures $10,000	May 26	Kraków; Poland	Clay	(Chile) Hans Podlipnik Castillo	(Chile) Guillermo Hormazábal (Chile) Hans Podlipnik Castillo
Slovenia F1 Futures $10,000	May 26	Krško; Slovenia	Clay	(Slovenia) Grega Žemlja	(Austria) Nicolas Reissig (Austria) Bertram Steinberger
Romania F5 Futures $10,000	May 26	Craiova; Romania	Clay	(Romania) Teodor-Dacian Crăciun	(Belarus) Pavel Katliarov (Russia) Andrei Plotniy
Czech Rep. F4 Futures $10,000	May 26	Karlovy Vary; Czech Republic	Clay	(Czech Republic) Michal Tabara	(Hungary) Kornél Bardóczky (Czech Republic) Martin Vacek
Bosnia & Herzegovina F4 Futures $10,000	May 26	Prijedor; Bosnia and Herzegovina	Clay	(Bosnia and Herzegovina) Sinisa Markovic	(Croatia) Marin Bradarić (Bosnia and Herzegovina) Tomislav Brkić

=== June ===
Tournament	Date	City	Surface	Singles champions	Doubles champions
Italy F16 Futures $10,000	June 2	Teramo; Italy	Clay	(Italy) Francesco Piccari	(Italy) Giulio Di Meo (Italy) Francesco Piccari
Spain F22 Futures $15,000	June 2	Puerto de la Cruz; Spain	Carpet	(Spain) José Checa Calvo	(Spain) Agustin Boje-Ordonez (Spain) Pablo Martin-Adalia
Poland F4 Futures $10,000	June 2	Koszalin; Poland	Clay	(Chile) Guillermo Hormazábal	(Poland) Artur Romanowski (Estonia) Jürgen Zopp
Slovenia F2 Futures $10,000	June 2	Maribor; Slovenia	Clay	(Slovenia) Marko Tkalec	(Belgium) Ruben Bemelmans (Belgium) Bart De Keenmaeku
Romania F6 Futures $10,000	June 2	Bacău; Romania	Clay	(Romania) Teodor-Dacian Crăciun	(Romania) Teodor-Dacian Crăciun (Romania) Victor Ioniță
Brazil F7 Futures $10,000	June 2	Guarulhos; Brazil	Clay	(Brazil) Rogério Dutra Silva	(Brazil) Rafael Camilo (Brazil) Rodrigo Guidolin
Ukraine F1 Futures $10,000	June 2	Cherkasy; Ukraine	Clay	(Italy) Luca Vanni	(Belarus) Aliaksandr Bury (Belarus) Vladimir Voltchkov
Ukraine F2 Futures $10,000	June 9	Cherkasy; Ukraine	Clay	(Italy) Luca Vanni	(Ukraine) Denys Molchanov (Ukraine) Artem Smirnov
Brazil F8 Futures $10,000	June 9	Cuiabá; Brazil	Clay	(Brazil) Rogério Dutra Silva	(Brazil) Rafael Camilo (Brazil) Rodrigo Guidolin
USA F12 Futures $15,000	June 9	Loomis, California; USA	Hard	(Dominican Republic) Víctor Estrella Burgos	(New Zealand) G.D. Jones (New Zealand) Daniel King-Turner
Japan F4 Futures $15,000	June 9	Karuizawa; Japan	Clay	(United States) Stephen Bass	(Japan) Tasuku Iwami (Japan) Hiroyasu Sato
Venezuela F1 Futures $10,000	June 9	Maracay; Venezuela	Hard	(Venezuela) José de Armas	(Venezuela) Miguel Cicenia (Venezuela) Luis David Martínez
Belarus F1 Futures $15,000	June 9	Minsk; Belarus	Hard	(Belarus) Uladzimir Ignatik	(Australia) Matthew Ebden (United Kingdom) Brydan Klein
Italy F17 Futures $10,000	June 9	Bassano; Italy	Clay	(Italy) Patrick Prader	(Spain) Cesar Ferrer-Victoria (Spain) Sergio Pérez Pérez
Spain F23 Futures $10,000	June 9	La Palma; Spain	Hard	(Spain) Íñigo Cervantes	(Spain) Ignacio Coll Riudavets (Spain) Carlos Rexach-Itoiz
Germany F6 Futures $15,000	June 9	Ingolstadt; Germany	Clay	(Canada) Érik Chvojka	(Canada) Érik Chvojka (Switzerland) Alexander Sadecky
Norway F1 Futures $10,000	June 9	Gausdal; Norway	Hard	(Italy) Riccardo Ghedin	(France) Fabrice Martin (United States) Lance Vodicka
Netherlands F1 Futures $15,000	June 9	Apeldoorn; Netherlands	Clay	(Netherlands) Thiemo de Bakker	(Netherlands) Romano Frantzen (Netherlands) Stephan Fransen
Slovenia F3 Futures $10,000	June 9	Koper; Slovenia	Clay	(Slovenia) Grega Žemlja	(Slovenia) Miha Mlakar (Slovenia) Bostjan Repansek
Romania F7 Futures $10,000	June 9	Focșani; Romania	Clay	(Romania) Teodor-Dacian Crăciun	(Romania) Victor-Mugurel Anagnastopol (Romania) Laurentiu Erlic
Macedonia F2 Futures $10,000	June 9	Skopje; Macedonia	Clay	(Bosnia and Herzegovina) Sinisa Markovic	(Bosnia and Herzegovina) Aleksandar Maric (Serbia) David Savić
Tunisia F1 Futures $10,000	June 9	Sousse; Tunisia	Clay	(Morocco) Rabie Chaki	(Tunisia) Walid Jallali (Tunisia) Malek Jaziri
France F8 Futures $15,000	June 16	Blois; France	Clay	(France) Nicolas Coutelot	(France) Julien Jeanpierre (France) Xavier Pujo
Belarus F2 Futures $15,000	June 16	Minsk 2 Belarus	Hard	(United Kingdom) Brydan Klein	(Canada) Pierre-Ludovic Duclos (Russia) Dmitri Sitak
Italy F18 Futures $10,000	June 16	Trieste; Italy	Clay	(Italy) Tomas Tenconi	(Italy) Andrea Fava (Italy) Matteo Viola
Spain F24 Futures $10,000	June 16	Santa Cruz; Spain	Hard	(France) Jean-Noel Insausti	(Spain) Agustin Boje-Ordonez (Spain) Pablo Martin-Adalia
Germany F7 Futures $15,000	June 16	Marburg; Germany	Clay	(Italy) Matteo Marrai	(Czech Republic) Roman Jebavý (Czech Republic) David Novak
Norway F2 Futures $10,000	June 16	Gausdal; Norway	Hard	(Norway) Stian Boretti	(Italy) Riccardo Ghedin (Czech Republic) Jiří Krkoška
Netherlands F2 Futures $15,000	June 16	Alkmaar; Netherlands	Clay	(Netherlands) Thiemo de Bakker	(Belgium) Niels Desein (Belgium) Jeroen Masson
Romania F8 Futures $10,000	June 16	Bucharest; Romania	Clay	(Romania) Victor Ioniță	(Bulgaria) Todor Enev (Bulgaria) Tihomir Grozdanov
Serbia F1 Futures $10,000	June 16	Belgrade; Serbia	Clay	(Hungary) Attila Balázs	(Croatia) Nikola Mektić (Croatia) Ivan Zovko
Venezuela F2 Futures $10,000	June 16	Caracas; Venezuela	Hard	(Ecuador) Julio César Campozano	(France) Philippe De Bonnevie (Japan) Norikazu Sugiyama
Argentina F4 Futures $10,000	June 16	Villa del Dique; Argentina	Clay	(Argentina) Jonathan Gonzalia	(Argentina) Guillermo Bujniewicz (Argentina) Nicolas Jara-Lozano
Iran F1 Futures $15,000	June 16	Tehran; Iran	Clay	(Czech Republic) Adam Vejmelka	(Kazakhstan) Alexey Kedryuk (Egypt) Mohamed Mamoun
Japan F5 Futures $10,000	June 16	Kusatsu; Japan	Carpet	(United States) Stephen Bass	(South Korea) Kwon Hyung-tae (South Korea) Lim Yong-kyu
Morocco F3 Futures $10,000	June 16	Agadir; Morocco	Clay	(Morocco) Talal Ouahabi	(Czech Republic) Roman Vögeli (Czech Republic) Michal Navrátil
USA F13 Futures $15,000	June 16	Sacramento, California; USA	Hard	(Brazil) Ricardo Hocevar	(New Zealand) G.D. Jones (New Zealand) Daniel King-Turner
Brazil F9 Futures $10,000	June 16	Fortaleza; Brazil	Hard	(Brazil) Eric Gomes	(Brazil) Diogo Cruz (Brazil) Eric Gomes
Ukraine F3 Futures $10,000	June 16	Illichivsk; Ukraine	Clay	(Russia) Evgeny Donskoy	(Ukraine) Denys Molchanov (Ukraine) Artem Smirnov
Ireland F1 Futures $15,000	June 16	Dublin; Ireland	Carpet	(Netherlands) Michel Koning	(United States) Brad Pomeroy (France) Ludovic Walter
Ireland F2 Futures $15,000	June 23	Limerick; Ireland	Carpet	(Republic of Ireland) Conor Niland	(Netherlands) Michel Koning (Denmark) Frederik Nielsen
Brazil F10 Futures $10,000	June 23	Teresina; Brazil	Clay	(Brazil) Rodrigo Guidolin	(Argentina) Matias Saenz (Argentina) Juan-Pablo Yunis
USA F14 Futures $15,000	June 23	Shingle Springs, California; USA	Hard	(Australia) Carsten Ball	(United States) Rylan Rizza (United States) Kaes Van't Hof
USA F15 Futures $10,000	June 23	Rochester, New York; USA	Clay	(India) Somdev Devvarman	(India) Somdev Devvarman (Philippines) Treat Huey
Morocco F4 Futures $10,000	June 23	Rabat; Morocco	Clay	(Spain) Cesar Ferrer Victoria	(Morocco) Mohamed Saber (Morocco) Mehdi Ziadi
Japan F6 Futures $10,000	June 23	Akishima; Japan	Carpet	(Japan) Yūichi Sugita	(China) Gong Maoxin (China) Li Zhe
Iran F2 Futures $15,000	June 23	Tehran; Iran	Clay	(Slovakia) Jan Stancik	(Kazakhstan) Alexey Kedryuk (Egypt) Mohamed Mamoun
Argentina F5 Futures $10,000	June 23	Villa del Dique; Argentina	Clay	(Argentina) Pablo Galdón	(Argentina) Guillermo Carry (Argentina) Antonio Pastorino
Venezuela F3 Futures $10,000	June 23	Valencia; Venezuela	Hard	(Venezuela) José de Armas	(United States) Eric Nunez (Venezuela) Yohny Romero
France F9 Futures $15,000	June 23	Toulon; France	Clay	(France) Nicolas Coutelot	(France) Thomas Fabre (France) Tony Pudico
Austria F4 Futures $10,000	June 23	Vandans; Austria	Clay	(Czech Republic) Filip Zeman	(Italy) Gaetano Marrone (United States) Matthew Roberts
Italy F19 Futures $10,000	June 23	Castelfranco; Italy	Clay	(Italy) Federico Torresi	(Italy) Giancarlo Petrazzuolo (Italy) Federico Torresi
Romania F9 Futures $10,000	June 23	Mediaș; Romania	Clay	(Romania) Gabriel Moraru	(Romania) Bogdan Leonte (Romania) Andrei Mlendea
Germany F8 Futures $10,000	June 23	Trier; Germany	Clay	(Germany) Dustin Brown	(Germany) Dustin Brown (Germany) Stefan Seifert
Norway F3 Futures $10,000	June 23	Oslo; Norway	Clay	(Finland) Timo Nieminen	(France) Fabrice Martin (United States) Lance Vodicka
Netherlands F3 Futures $15,000	June 23	Breda; Netherlands	Clay	(Germany) Alexander Flock	(Netherlands) Jesse Huta Galung (Netherlands) Matwé Middelkoop
Serbia F2 Futures $10,000	June 23	Belgrade; Serbia	Clay	(Serbia) Aleksander Slovic	(Serbia) Nikola Ćaćić (Serbia) Dušan Lajović
France F10 Futures $15,000	June 30	Montauban; France	Clay	(France) Nicolas Coutelot	(France) Julien Jeanpierre (France) Jean-Baptiste Perlant
Austria F5 Futures $10,000	June 30	Telfs; Austria	Clay	(Austria) Armin Sandbichler	(Austria) Christoph Palmanshofer (United States) Matthew Roberts
Italy F20 Futures $15,000	June 30	Bologna; Italy	Clay	(Italy) Tomas Tenconi	(Czech Republic) Dušan Lojda (Italy) Federico Torresi
Spain F25 Futures $15,000	June 30	Alicante; Spain	Clay	(Spain) Albert Ramos Viñolas	(Spain) David Ollivier-Baquero (Spain) Carlos Rexach-Itoiz
Germany F9 Futures $15,000	June 30	Kassel; Germany	Clay	(Netherlands) Martin Verkerk	(Germany) Dustin Brown (Germany) Stefan Seifert
Romania F10 Futures $10,000	June 30	Balș; Romania	Clay	(Romania) Gabriel Moraru	(Romania) Gabriel Moraru (Romania) Andrei Mlendea
Turkey F7 Futures $15,000	June 30	Istanbul; Turkey	Hard	(Turkey) Marsel İlhan	(Uzbekistan) Arsen Asanov (Turkey) Marsel İlhan
Argentina F6 Futures $10,000	June 30	Villa María; Argentina	Clay	(Argentina) Marco Trungelliti	(Argentina) Diego Álvarez (Argentina) Guillermo Carry
Japan F7 Futures $10,000	June 30	Ariake; Japan	Hard	(Japan) Yūichi Sugita	(China) Gong Maoxin (China) Li Zhe
Morocco F5 Futures $10,000	June 30	Kenitra; Morocco	Clay	(Morocco) Rabie Chaki	(Morocco) Mohamed Saber (Morocco) Mehdi Ziadi
USA F16 Futures $10,000	June 30	Pittsburgh; USA	Clay	(India) Somdev Devvarman	(India) Somdev Devvarman (Philippines) Treat Huey
Brazil F11 Futures $10,000	June 30	Ribeirão Preto; Brazil	Clay	(Brazil) André Miele	(Brazil) Cledson Carvalho (Brazil) Tiago Lopes
Kazakhstan F1 Futures $10,000	June 30	Astana; Kazakhstan	Hard	(Uzbekistan) Murad Inoyatov	(Uzbekistan) Murad Inoyatov (Kazakhstan) Alexey Kedryuk
Peru F1 Futures $10,000	June 30	Arequipa; Peru	Clay	(Argentina) Cristhian Ignacio Benedetti	(Venezuela) Miguel Cicenia (France) Benjamin Dracos

=== July ===
Tournament	Date	City	Surface	Singles champions	Doubles champions
Peru F2 Futures $10,000	July 7	Lima; Peru	Clay	(France) Benjamin Dracos	(Peru) Alvaro Raposo De Oliveira (Chile) Cristóbal Saavedra Corvalán
Syria F1 Futures $15,000	July 7	Damascus; Syria	Hard	(Canada) Pierre-Ludovic Duclos	(Austria) Richard Ruckelshausen (India) Navdeep Singh
USA F17 Futures $10,000	July 7	Peoria, Illinois; USA	Clay	(United States) Jean-Yves Aubone	(United States) Marcus Fugate (Armenia) Tigran Martirosyan
Argentina F7 Futures $10,000	July 7	Córdoba; Argentina	Clay	(Argentina) Lionel Noviski	(Argentina) Lionel Noviski (Argentina) Antonio Pastorino
Azerbaijan F1 Futures $10,000	July 7	Baku; Azerbaijan	Clay	(Russia) Danila Arsenov	(Italy) Pietro Fanucci (Italy) Matteo Volante
Kazakhstan F2 Futures $10,000	July 7	Almaty; Kazakhstan	Clay	(Czech Republic) Adam Vejmelka	(Russia) Ilya Belyaev (Russia) Sergei Krotiouk
France F11 Futures $15,000	July 7	Bourg-en-Bresse; France	Clay	(France) Jonathan Eysseric	(France) Stéphane Robert (France) Alexandre Renard
Austria F6 Futures $10,000	July 7	Kramsach; Austria	Clay	(Austria) Johannes Ager	(Italy) Andrea Arnaboldi (Mexico) Juan Manuel Elizondo
Italy F21 Futures $15,000	July 7	Carpi; Italy	Clay	(Spain) Pablo Santos	(Italy) Giancarlo Petrazzuolo (Italy) Federico Torresi
Spain F26 Futures $15,000	July 7	Elche; Spain	Clay	(Spain) Sergio Gutiérrez Ferrol	(Spain) Cesar Ferrer-Victoria (Spain) Héctor Ruiz-Cadenas
Germany F10 Futures $10,000	July 7	Römerberg; Germany	Clay	(Germany) Andre Begemann	(Netherlands) Roy Bruggeling (Netherlands) Bas Van der Valk
Great Britain F9 Futures $15,000	July 7	Felixstowe; Great Britain	Grass	(Netherlands) Michel Koning	(Australia) Matthew Ebden (United Kingdom) Brydan Klein
Romania F11 Futures $10,000	July 7	Bucharest; Romania	Clay	(Romania) Victor Ioniță	(Ukraine) Vladislav Bondarenko (Hungary) Róbert Varga
Turkey F8 Futures $15,000	July 7	Istanbul; Turkey	Hard	(Moldova) Andrei Gorban	(Ivory Coast) Valentin Sanon (France) Ludovic Walter
Paraguay F1 Futures $10,000	July 7	Lambaré; Paraguay	Clay	(Argentina) Pablo Galdón	(Argentina) Hector Damian Guichonet (Argentina) Leandro Torres
Paraguay F2 Futures $10,000	July 14	Lambaré; Paraguay	Clay	(Argentina) Juan-Pablo Amado	(Argentina) Martín Alund (Argentina) Facundo Bagnis
Italy F22 Futures $10,000	July 14	Palazzolo; Italy	Clay	(Chile) Guillermo Hormazábal	(Chile) Guillermo Hormazábal (Chile) Hans Podlipnik Castillo
Spain F27 Futures $10,000	July 14	Gandia; Spain	Clay	(Spain) Íñigo Cervantes	(Netherlands) Romano Frantzen (Netherlands) Stephan Fransen
Germany F11 Futures $10,000	July 14	Espelkamp; Germany	Clay	(Italy) Federico Torresi	(Netherlands) Roy Bruggeling (Netherlands) Bas Van der Valk
Great Britain F10 Futures $15,000	July 14	Frinton-on-Sea; Great Britain	Grass	(Netherlands) Michel Koning	(Australia) Sadik Kadir (United States) Shane La Porte
Georgia F1 Futures $15,000	July 14	Tbilisi; Georgia	Clay	(Italy) Matteo Marrai	(Ukraine) Ivan Anikanov (Ukraine) Aleksandr Yarmola
Romania F12 Futures $10,000	July 14	Iași; Romania	Clay	(France) Frederic Jeanclaude	(Ukraine) Vladislav Bondarenko (France) Florian Reynet
France F12 Futures $15,000	July 14	Saint-Gervais; France	Clay	(France) Jonathan Dasnières de Veigy	(Mexico) Juan Manuel Elizondo (France) Nicolas Grammare
Kazakhstan F3 Futures $10,000	July 14	Shymkent; Kazakhstan	Clay	(South Korea) Kang Byung-kook	(United Kingdom) Maniel Bains (Australia) Matheson Klein
USA F18 Futures $10,000	July 14	Joplin, Missouri; USA	Hard	(Armenia) Tigran Martirosyan	(United States) Steven Forman (United States) Cory Parr
Syria F2 Futures $15,000	July 14	Damascus; Syria	Hard	(Russia) Danila Arsenov	(Lebanon) Bassam Beidas (Romania) Ioan-Alexandru Cojanu
Peru F3 Futures $10,000	July 14	Trujillo; Peru	Clay	(Argentina) Guido Pella	(Peru) Mauricio Echazú (Peru) Matías Silva
Brazil F12 Futures $10,000	July 21	Brasília; Brazil	Clay	(Brazil) André Miele	(Brazil) Marcelo Demoliner (Brazil) André Miele
Estonia F1 Futures $10,000	July 21	Kuressaare; Estonia	Clay	(Spain) Jaak Põldma	(Finland) Harri Heliövaara (Finland) Timo Nieminen
Venezuela F4 Futures $10,000	July 21	Maracaibo; Venezuela	Hard	(Venezuela) José de Armas	(Venezuela) Piero Luisi (Venezuela) Roberto Maytín
USA F19 Futures $10,000	July 21	Godfrey, Illinois; USA	Hard	(Spain) Arnau Brugués Davi	(United States) Austin Krajicek (United States) Conor Pollock
Italy F23 Futures $15,000	July 21	Modena; Italy	Clay	(Italy) Tomas Tenconi	(Chile) Guillermo Hormazábal (Chile) Hans Podlipnik Castillo
Spain F28 Futures $10,000	July 21	Dénia; Spain	Clay	(United Kingdom) James Ward	(Spain) Pedro Clar (Spain) Pablo Martin-Adalia
Romania F13 Futures $10,000	July 21	Târgu Mureș; Romania	Clay	(Romania) Gabriel Moraru	(Italy) Andrea Arnaboldi (Ukraine) Vladislav Bondarenko
Georgia F2 Futures $15,000	July 21	Tbilisi; Georgia	Clay	(Italy) Matteo Marrai	(Italy) Matteo Marrai (Latvia) Deniss Pavlovs
Germany F12 Futures $10,000	July 21	Erftstadt; Germany	Clay	(Czech Republic) Michal Navrátil	(Germany) Martin Emmrich (Germany) Bastian Knittel
Paraguay F3 Futures $10,000	July 21	Lambaré; Paraguay	Clay	(Argentina) Martín Alund	(Brazil) Alexandre Bonatto (Argentina) Juan-Pablo Yunis
Italy F24 Futures $10,000	July 28	La Spezia; Italy	Clay	(Italy) Thomas Fabbiano	(Italy) Massimo Capone (Italy) Claudio Grassi
Spain F29 Futures $10,000	July 28	Xàtiva; Spain	Clay	(Spain) Roberto Bautista Agut	(Spain) Ignacio Coll Riudavets (Spain) Gerard Granollers
Germany F13 Futures $10,000	July 28	Wetzlar; Germany	Clay	(Hungary) Kornél Bardóczky	(Netherlands) Roy Bruggeling (Netherlands) Bas Van der Valk
Great Britain F11 Futures $10,000	July 28	Ilkley; Great Britain	Grass	(France) Mathieu Rodrigues	(France) Grégoire Burquier (France) Mathieu Rodrigues
Romania F14 Futures $10,000	July 28	Oradea; Romania	Clay	(Hungary) Ádám Kellner	(Moldova) Radu Albot (Moldova) Andrei Ciumac
USA F20 Futures $10,000	July 28	Decatur, Illinois; USA	Hard	(South Africa) Raven Klaasen	(Armenia) Tigran Martirosyan (South Korea) Daniel Yoo
Venezuela F5 Futures $10,000	July 28	Valencia; Venezuela	Hard	(Venezuela) José de Armas	(Colombia) Alejandro González (Colombia) Eduardo Struvay
Indonesia F1 Futures $10,000	July 28	Jakarta; Indonesia	Hard	(Japan) Yūichi Sugita	(Indonesia) Christopher Rungkat (Indonesia) Ayrton Wibowo
Senegal F1 Futures $15,000	July 28	Dakar; Senegal	Hard	(Canada) Pierre-Ludovic Duclos	(Canada) Pierre-Ludovic Duclos (Belgium) Niels Desein
Latvia F1 Futures $10,000	July 28	Jūrmala; Latvia	Clay	(Czech Republic) Roman Vögeli	(Poland) Marcin Gawron (Poland) Andriej Kapaś
Brazil F13 Futures $10,000	July 28	Ribeirão Preto; Brazil	Clay	(Brazil) Alexandre Bonatto	(Brazil) Adriano Ferreira (Brazil) Roberto Jabali

=== August ===
Tournament	Date	City	Surface	Singles champions	Doubles champions
Brazil F14 Futures $15,000	August 4	Itu; Brazil	Clay	(Argentina) Juan-Pablo Amado	(Argentina) Guillermo Bujniewicz (Argentina) Lionel Noviski
Lithuania F1 Futures $10,000	August 4	Vilnius; Lithuania	Clay	(Italy) Stefano Ianni	(Italy) Stefano Ianni (Italy) Uros Vico
Senegal F2 Futures $15,000	August 4	Dakar; Senegal	Hard	(Belgium) Niels Desein	(Canada) Pierre-Ludovic Duclos (Belgium) Niels Desein
Serbia F3 Futures $10,000	August 4	Novi Sad; Serbia	Clay	(Serbia) Nikola Ćirić	(Croatia) Antonio Šančić (Croatia) Vilim Visak
Iran F3 Futures $15,000	August 4	Tehran; Iran	Clay	(Czech Republic) Adam Vejmelka	(Czech Republic) Jiří Krkoška (Czech Republic) Adam Vejmelka
Indonesia F2 Futures $10,000	August 4	Balikpapan; Indonesia	Hard	(Japan) Yūichi Sugita	(Chinese Taipei) Huang Chin-yu (Chinese Taipei) Lin Dai-chiao
Venezuela F6 Futures $10,000	August 4	Valencia; Venezuela	Hard	(France) Fabrice Martin	(Venezuela) Piero Luisi (Venezuela) Roberto Maytín
USA F21 Futures $10,000	August 4	Milwaukee, Wisconsin; USA	Hard	(South Korea) Daniel Yoo	(United States) Edward-Ted Kelly (United States) Jeff Tarango
Slovak Rep. F1 Futures $10,000	August 4	Žilina; Slovakia	Clay	(Czech Republic) František Čermák	(Czech Republic) Roman Jebavý (Czech Republic) Filip Zeman
Italy F25 Futures $10,000	August 4	Avezzano; Italy	Clay	(Sweden) Michael Ryderstedt	(Chile) Guillermo Hormazábal (Chile) Hans Podlipnik Castillo
Spain F30 Futures $10,000	August 4	Bakio; Spain	Hard	(France) Jean-Noel Insausti	(Spain) Georgi Rumenov Payakov (Portugal) João Sousa
Great Britain F12 Futures $10,000	August 4	Wrexham; Great Britain	Hard	(United Kingdom) Dan Evans	(United Kingdom) David Brewer (United Kingdom) Ian Flanagan
Romania F15 Futures $10,000	August 4	Arad; Romania	Clay	(Croatia) Kristijan Mesaroš	(Romania) Artemon Apostu-Efremov (Romania) Alexandru-Daniel Carpen
Luxembourg F1 Futures $10,000	August 4	Luxembourg; Luxembourg	Clay	(Croatia) Ivan Cerović	(Argentina) Antonio Pastorino (Argentina) Damián Patriarca
Belarus F3 Futures $15,000	August 4	Pinsk; Belarus	Clay	(Czech Republic) Jan Mertl	(Belarus) Sergey Betov (Belarus) Dzmitry Zhyrmont
Belarus F4 Futures $15,000	August 11	Minsk; Belarus	Clay	(France) Philippe De Bonnevie	(Ukraine) Ivan Anikanov (Belarus) Pavel Katliarov
Slovak Rep. F2 Futures $10,000	August 11	Piešťany; Slovakia	Clay	(Czech Republic) Dušan Lojda	(Australia) Raphael Durek (Poland) Robert Godlewski
Belgium F1 Futures $10,000	August 11	Eupen; Belgium	Clay	(Monaco) Clément Morel	(Netherlands) Romano Frantzen (Netherlands) Stephan Fransen
Russia F3 Futures $15,000	August 11	Moscow; Russia	Clay	(Slovakia) Pavol Červenák	(Slovakia) Pavol Červenák (Slovakia) Alexander Somogyi
Italy F26 Futures $15,000	August 11	Bolzano; Italy	Clay	(Italy) Tomas Tenconi	(Italy) Antonio Comporto (Italy) Thomas Fabbiano
Spain F31 Futures $15,000	August 11	Irun; Spain	Clay	(France) Romain Jouan	(Spain) Íñigo Cervantes (Spain) Gerard Granollers
Germany F15 Futures $10,000	August 11	Unterföhring; Germany	Clay	(Austria) Johannes Ager	(Czech Republic) Roman Vögeli (Germany) David Klier
Great Britain F13 Futures $10,000	August 11	Cumberland; Great Britain	Hard	(United Kingdom) Dan Evans	(United Kingdom) David Brewer (United Kingdom) Ian Flanagan
Romania F16 Futures $10,000	August 11	Deva; Romania	Clay	(Romania) Marius Copil	(Romania) Marius Copil (Romania) Ilie-Aurelian Giurgiu
Indonesia F3 Futures $10,000	August 11	Manado; Indonesia	Hard	(South Korea) Kwon Oh-hee	(South Korea) Kim Young-jun (South Korea) Kim Young-jae
Iran F4 Futures $15,000	August 11	Tehran; Iran	Clay	(Japan) Junn Mitsuhashi	(Czech Republic) Jiří Krkoška (Czech Republic) Adam Vejmelka
Serbia F4 Futures $10,000	August 11	Sombor; Serbia	Clay	(Serbia) Nikola Ćirić	(Croatia) Antonio Šančić (Croatia) Vilim Visak
Lithuania F2 Futures $10,000	August 11	Vilnius; Lithuania	Clay	(Italy) Matteo Viola	(Italy) Fabio Colangelo (Italy) Uros Vico
Brazil F15 Futures $10,000	August 11	Barueri; Brazil	Hard	(Brazil) Eric Gomes	(Brazil) Eric Gomes (Brazil) Tiago Lopes
Ecuador F1 Futures $10,000	August 11	Quito; Ecuador	Clay	(Ecuador) Iván Endara	(Argentina) Juan-Manuel Romanazzi (Argentina) Agustín Velotti
Ecuador F2 Futures $10,000	August 18	Guayaquil; Ecuador	Hard	(Ecuador) Carlos Avellán	(United States) Shane La Porte (France) Fabrice Martin
Brazil F16 Futures $10,000	August 18	São José do Rio Preto; Brazil	Clay	(Brazil) Leonardo Kirche	(Brazil) Marcelo Demoliner (Brazil) Rodrigo-Antonio Grilli
Serbia F5 Futures $10,000	August 18	Subotica; Serbia	Clay	(Hungary) Attila Balázs	(Serbia) Aleksander Slovic (Montenegro) Goran Tošić
Egypt F3 Futures $10,000	August 18	Cairo; Egypt	Clay	(Morocco) Talal Ouahabi	(Egypt) Karim Maamoun (Egypt) Sherif Sabry
Finland F1 Futures $10,000	August 18	Vierumäki; Finland	Clay	(Estonia) Jürgen Zopp	(Estonia) Mait Künnap (Spain) Jordi Marse-Vidri
Slovak Rep. F3 Futures $10,000	August 18	Stupava; Slovakia	Clay	(Czech Republic) Michal Tabara	(Czech Republic) Jan Blecha (Chile) Ricardo Urzua-Rivera
Belgium F2 Futures $10,000	August 18	Koksijde; Belgium	Clay	(Morocco) Rabie Chaki	(Belgium) Ruben Bemelmans (Belgium) Niels Desein
Austria F7 Futures $10,000	August 18	St. Polten; Austria	Clay	(Czech Republic) Dušan Lojda	(Germany) Dennis Bloemke (Germany) Dimitris Kleftakos
Russia F4 Futures $15,000	August 18	Moscow; Russia	Clay	(Ukraine) Ivan Sergeyev	(Ukraine) Alexandr Dolgopolov (Ukraine) Artem Smirnov
Italy F27 Futures $15,000	August 18	Este; Italy	Clay	(Italy) Tomas Tenconi	(Croatia) Marin Bradarić (Croatia) Luka Belić
Spain F32 Futures $15,000	August 18	Santander; Spain	Clay	(France) Romain Jouan	(Spain) Agustin Boje-Ordonez (Spain) Ignacio Coll Riudavets
Germany F16 Futures $15,000	August 18	Wahlstedt; Germany	Clay	(Chile) Adrián García	(Germany) Sebastian Rieschick (Russia) Dmitri Sitak
Netherlands F4 Futures $15,000	August 18	Enschede; Netherlands	Clay	(Germany) Sascha Klör	(Netherlands) Roy Bruggeling (Netherlands) Bas Van der Valk
Croatia F6 Futures $10,000	August 18	Vinkovci; Croatia	Clay	(Croatia) Kristijan Mesaroš	(Croatia) Nikola Mektić (Croatia) Ivan Zovko
Bulgaria F5 Futures $10,000	August 18	Dobrich; Bulgaria	Clay	(Serbia) Aleksandar Cvetkov	(Bulgaria) Tihomir Grozdanov (Bulgaria) Simeon Ivanov
Romania F17 Futures $10,000	August 18	Mediaș; Romania	Clay	(Romania) Gabriel Moraru	(Romania) Robert Coman (Romania) Costin Pavăl
Poland F5 Futures $15,000	August 18	Olsztyn; Poland	Clay	(Poland) Jerzy Janowicz	(Poland) Jerzy Janowicz (Poland) Mateusz Kowalczyk
Belgium F3 Futures $10,000	August 25	Brussels; Belgium	Clay	(Denmark) Martin Pedersen	(Belgium) Maxime Braeckman (Belgium) Jeroen Masson
Austria F8 Futures $10,000	August 25	Pörtschach; Austria	Clay	(Austria) Johannes Ager	(Austria) Marc Rath (Germany) Daniel Stoehr
Russia F5 Futures $10,000	August 25	Sochi; Russia	Clay	(Russia) Vladimir Karusevich	(Russia) Ilya Belyaev (Russia) Sergei Krotiouk
Italy F28 Futures $15,000	August 25	Piombino; Italy	Hard	(Canada) Pierre-Ludovic Duclos	(Canada) Pierre-Ludovic Duclos (Belgium) Niels Desein
Spain F33 Futures $15,000	August 25	Oviedo; Spain	Clay	(Spain) Gabriel Trujillo Soler	(Greece) Alexandros Jakupovic (Spain) Gabriel Trujillo Soler
Germany F17 Futures $10,000	August 25	Überlingen; Germany	Clay	(Chile) Adrián García	(Czech Republic) Roman Vögeli (Czech Republic) Jan Subota
Netherlands F5 Futures $15,000	August 25	Vlaardingen; Netherlands	Clay	(Germany) Gero Kretschmer	(Netherlands) Roy Bruggeling (Netherlands) Bas Van der Valk
Croatia F7 Futures $10,000	August 25	Čakovec; Croatia	Clay	(Croatia) Mislav Hizak	(Croatia) Antonio Šančić (Croatia) Vilim Visak
Bulgaria F6 Futures $10,000	August 25	Bourgas; Bulgaria	Clay	(Bulgaria) Ivaylo Traykov	(Ukraine) Gleb Alekseenko (Ukraine) Vadim Alekseenko
Romania F18 Futures $10,000	August 25	Brașov; Romania	Clay	(Romania) Victor Ioniță	(Romania) Alin-Mihai Constantin (Romania) Andrei Mlendea
Poland F6 Futures $15,000	August 25	Poznań; Poland	Clay	(Poland) Grzegorz Panfil	(Poland) Mateusz Szmigiel (Slovakia) Mario Trnovsky
Argentina F8 Futures $10,000	August 25	Oberá; Argentina	Clay	(Uruguay) Marcel Felder	(Argentina) Guillermo Carry (Argentina) Diego Cristin
Egypt F4 Futures $10,000	August 25	Giza; Egypt	Clay	(Germany) Andre Begemann	(Morocco) Anas Fattar (Morocco) Talal Ouahabi
Serbia F6 Futures $10,000	August 25	Čačak; Serbia	Clay	(Serbia) Nikola Ćirić	(Serbia) Aleksander Slovic (Montenegro) Goran Tošić
Brazil F17 Futures $10,000	August 25	Santos; Brazil	Clay	(Brazil) Eric Gomes	(Brazil) Eric Gomes (Brazil) Tiago Lopes
Ecuador F3 Futures $10,000	August 25	Guayaquil; Ecuador	Hard	(Ecuador) Carlos Avellán	(Italy) Luigi D'Agord (Philippines) Treat Huey

=== September ===
Tournament	Date	City	Surface	Singles champions	Doubles champions
Brazil F18 Futures $10,000	September 1	São José do Rio Preto; Brazil	Clay	(Argentina) Juan-Pablo Amado	(Brazil) Diogo Cruz (Brazil) Rodrigo-Antonio Grilli
Egypt F5 Futures $10,000	September 1	Cairo; Egypt	Clay	(Morocco) Talal Ouahabi	(Germany) Andre Begemann (Romania) Ioan-Alexandru Cojanu
Argentina F9 Futures $10,000	September 1	Santa Fe; Argentina	Clay	(Argentina) Jonathan Gonzalia	(Argentina) Facundo Argüello (Argentina) Agustin Picco
Thailand F4 Futures $10,000	September 1	Khon Kaen; Thailand	Hard	(Chinese Taipei) Chen Ti	(China) Gao Wan (China) Yu Xinyuan
India F6 Futures $15,000	September 1	Chennai; India	Clay	(Germany) Peter Gojowczyk	(India) Divij Sharan (India) Vishnu Vardhan
Italy F29 Futures $10,000	September 1	Torre del Greco; Italy	Clay	(Morocco) Reda El Amrani	(Italy) Alessandro Accardo (Italy) Matteo Volante
France F13 Futures $15,000	September 1	Bagnères-de-Bigorre; France	Hard	(Austria) Martin Fischer	(France) Olivier Charroin (Latvia) Andis Juška
Poland F7 Futures $10,000	September 1	Wrocław; Poland	Clay	(Poland) Jerzy Janowicz	(Poland) Andriej Kapaś (Poland) Bojan Szumanski
Austria F9 Futures $10,000	September 1	Vienna; Austria	Clay	(Slovakia) Kamil Čapkovič	(Slovakia) Kamil Čapkovič (Slovakia) Jan Stancik
Russia F6 Futures $15,000	September 1	Sergiyev Posad; Russia	Clay	(Russia) Valery Rudnev	(Russia) Victor Kozin (Russia) Andrei Levine
Germany F18 Futures $15,000	September 1	Kempten; Germany	Clay	(Chile) Adrián García	(Czech Republic) Jan Mertl (Czech Republic) Filip Zeman
Croatia F8 Futures $10,000	September 1	Zagreb; Croatia	Clay	(Croatia) Antonio Šančić	(Croatia) Roman Kelecic (Croatia) Antonio Šančić
Bulgaria F7 Futures $10,000	September 1	Sliven; Bulgaria	Clay	(Bulgaria) Ivaylo Traykov	(Ukraine) Gleb Alekseenko (Ukraine) Vadim Alekseenko
France F14 Futures $15,000	September 8	Mulhouse; France	Hard (i)	(Switzerland) Michael Lammer	(Belgium) Ruben Bemelmans (Belgium) Niels Desein
Great Britain F14 Futures $15,000	September 8	Nottingham; Great Britain	Hard	(Austria) Martin Fischer	(France) Jeremy Blandin (Austria) Martin Fischer
Russia F7 Futures $10,000	September 8	Volgograd; Russia	Clay	(Russia) Evgeny Kirillov	(Russia) Victor Kozin (Russia) Andrei Levine
Spain F34 Futures $15,000	September 8	Móstoles; Spain	Hard	(Bulgaria) Grigor Dimitrov	(Spain) David Canudas-Fernandez (France) Ludovic Walter
Germany F19 Futures $10,000	September 8	Friedberg; Germany	Clay	(Germany) Sascha Klör	(Germany) Sascha Klör (Germany) Marius Zay
India F7 Futures $15,000	September 8	New Delhi; India	Hard	(Germany) Peter Gojowczyk	(India) Sunil-Kumar Sipaeya (India) Ashutosh Singh
Thailand F5 Futures $10,000	September 8	Bangkok; Thailand	Hard	(Chinese Taipei) Chen Ti	(United States) Nathan Thompson (United States) Ryan Young
Argentina F10 Futures $10,000	September 8	Rosario, Santa Fe; Argentina	Clay	(Argentina) Antonio Pastorino	(Argentina) Mauro Ferrer (Argentina) Juan Ferrer
Burundi F1 Futures $10,000	September 8	Bujumbura; Burundi	Clay	(Germany) Andre Begemann	(South Africa) Hendrik Coertzen (Uganda) Duncan Mugabe
Bulgaria F8 Futures $10,000	September 8	Stara Zagora; Bulgaria	Clay	(Bulgaria) Tihomir Grozdanov	(Bulgaria) Boris Nicola Bakalov (Bulgaria) Vasko Mladenov
USA F22 Futures $10,000	September 8	Claremont, California; USA	Hard	(Armenia) Tigran Martirosyan	(United States) Marcus Fugate (Australia) Nima Roshan
Australia F5 Futures $15,000	September 8	Rockhampton; Australia	Hard	(Australia) Nick Lindahl	(Australia) Andrew Coelho (Australia) Adam Feeney
Japan F8 Futures $15,000	September 8	Osaka; Japan	Hard	(Japan) Junn Mitsuhashi	(China) Gong Maoxin (China) Li Zhe
Brazil F19 Futures $15,000	September 8	Fortaleza; Brazil	Clay	(Argentina) Juan-Pablo Amado	(Brazil) Marcelo Demoliner (Brazil) Tiago Lopes
Bolivia F1 Futures $10,000	September 8	Santa Cruz de la Sierra; Bolivia	Clay	(Argentina) Cristhian Ignacio Benedetti	(Argentina) Guillermo Carry (Argentina) Andrés Molteni
Italy F30 Futures $15,000	September 8	Porto Torres; Italy	Hard	(Italy) Massimo Dell'Acqua	(Italy) Fabio Colangelo (Italy) Uros Vico
Italy F31 Futures $10,000	September 15	Alghero; Italy	Hard		
Sweden F1 Futures $15,000	September 15	Gothenburg; Sweden	Hard (i)	(France) Mathieu Rodrigues	(Sweden) Robert Gustafsson (Sweden) Rickard Holmstrom
Bolivia F2 Futures $10,000	September 15	Cochabamba; Bolivia	Clay	(Argentina) Gonzalo Tur	(Argentina) Guillermo Carry (Argentina) Andrés Molteni
Brazil F20 Futures $15,000	September 15	Recife; Brazil	Clay (i)	(Brazil) Tiago Lopes	(Brazil) Andre Pinheiro (Brazil) Fernando Romboli
Japan F9 Futures $15,000	September 15	Sapporo; Japan	Carpet	(Japan) Satoshi Iwabuchi	(Japan) Satoshi Iwabuchi (Japan) Ko Suzuki
Australia F6 Futures $15,000	September 15	Kawana; Australia	Hard	(Australia) Colin Ebelthite	(Australia) Andrew Coelho (Australia) Adam Feeney
USA F23 Futures $10,000	September 15	Costa Mesa, California; USA	Hard	(United States) Zack Fleishman	(United States) Zack Fleishman (United States) Michael McClune
Ecuador F4 Futures $10,000	September 15	Quito; Ecuador	Clay	(Argentina) Lionel Noviski	(Argentina) Cristhian Ignacio Benedetti (Argentina) Lionel Noviski
Rwanda F1 Futures $10,000	September 15	Kigali; Rwanda	Clay	(Germany) Andre Begemann	(Romania) Bogdan Leonte (Lithuania) Gvidas Sabeckis
Thailand F6 Futures $10,000	September 15	Nonthaburi; Thailand	Hard	(Germany) Peter Gojowczyk	(Germany) Peter Gojowczyk (Chinese Taipei) Lee Hsin-han
Greece F4 Futures $10,000	September 15	Kefallonia; Greece	Hard	(Belgium) David Goffin	(Croatia) Ante Pavić (Serbia) Ilija Vucic
Russia F8 Futures $10,000	September 15	Sochi; Russia	Clay	(Russia) Ilya Belyaev	(Russia) Mikhail Fufygin (Russia) Vitali Reshetnikov
France F15 Futures $15,000	September 15	Plaisir; France	Hard (i)	(France) Adrian Mannarino	(Morocco) Rabie Chaki (Tunisia) Malek Jaziri
Great Britain F15 Futures $15,000	September 15	Nottingham; Great Britain	Hard	(France) Stéphane Robert	(United Kingdom) David Brewer (United Kingdom) Ian Flanagan
Spain F35 Futures $15,000	September 15	Alcorcón; Spain	Hard	(Bulgaria) Grigor Dimitrov	(Spain) José Checa Calvo (Greece) Alexandros Jakupovic
Germany F20 Futures $10,000	September 15	Nuremberg; Germany	Clay	(Czech Republic) David Novak	(Germany) Holger Fischer (Germany) Tobias Klein
France F16 Futures $10,000	September 22	Sarreguemines; France	Carpet (i)	(Germany) Frank Wintermantel	(Germany) Kevin Deden (Germany) Martin Emmrich
Greece F5 Futures $10,000	September 22	Paros; Greece	Carpet	(Switzerland) Mathieu Guenat	(Germany) Dennis Bloemke (Germany) Dimitris Kleftakos
Uganda F1 Futures $10,000	September 22	Kampala; Uganda	Clay	(Germany) Andre Begemann	(Germany) Andre Begemann (Russia) Alexei Filenkov
Ecuador F5 Futures $10,000	September 22	Quito; Ecuador	Clay	(Argentina) Cristhian Ignacio Benedetti	(Argentina) Federico Cavallero (Argentina) Marcos Conocente
Mexico F9 Futures $10,000	September 22	Metepec; Mexico	Hard	(Uruguay) Marcel Felder	(Mexico) Miguel Gallardo Valles (Mexico) Carlos Palencia
Italy F32 Futures $10,000	September 22	Olbia; Italy	Clay	(Germany) Bastian Knittel	(Spain) David Ollivier-Baquero (Spain) Carlos Rexach-Itoiz
USA F24 Futures $10,000	September 22	Irvine, California; USA	Hard	(Germany) Tobias Clemens	(Brazil) Victor-Carvalho Melo (Sweden) Andreas Siljeström
Australia F7 Futures $15,000	September 22	Gympie; Australia	Hard	(Australia) Andrew Coelho	(Australia) Adam Hubble (Australia) Greg Jones
Brazil F21 Futures $10,000	September 22	Aracaju, Sergipe; Brazil	Clay (i)	(Brazil) Marcelo Demoliner	(France) Marc Auradou (Brazil) Rodrigo-Antonio Grilli
Bolivia F3 Futures $10,000	September 22	La Paz; Bolivia	Clay	(Argentina) Facundo Bagnis	(Argentina) Guillermo Carry (Argentina) Andrés Molteni
Sweden F2 Futures $15,000	September 22	Falun; Sweden	Hard (i)	(Sweden) Michael Ryderstedt	(Finland) Henri Kontinen (Finland) Timo Nieminen
Spain F36 Futures $15,000	September 22	Martos; Spain	Hard	(Spain) Roberto Bautista Agut	(Slovakia) Kamil Čapkovič (Russia) Dmitri Sitak
Bosnia & Herzegovina F6 Futures $15,000	September 22	Mostar; Bosnia and Herzegovina	Clay	(Germany) Marc Sieber	(Croatia) Ivan Cerović (Latvia) Deniss Pavlovs
France F17 Futures $15,000	September 29	Nevers; France	Hard (i)	(France) Stéphane Robert	(France) Vincent Millot (France) Pierrick Ysern
Spain F37 Futures $15,000	September 29	Córdoba; Spain	Hard	(Spain) Roberto Bautista Agut	(Spain) Agustin Boje-Ordonez (Spain) Ignacio Coll Riudavets
Germany F21 Futures $10,000	September 29	HamBach; Germany	Carpet (i)	(Germany) Peter Torebko	(Germany) Kevin Deden (Germany) Martin Emmrich
Bosnia & Herzegovina F7 Futures $15,000	September 29	Mostar; Bosnia and Herzegovina	Clay	(Croatia) Ivan Dodig	(Croatia) Ivan Cerović (Latvia) Deniss Pavlovs
Bolivia F4 Futures $10,000	September 29	Tarija; Bolivia	Clay	(Argentina) Juan-Pablo Amado	(Bolivia) Mauricio Estívariz (Bolivia) Jose-Roberto Velasco
Brazil F22 Futures $10,000	September 29	Itu; Brazil	Clay	(Brazil) Leonardo Kirche	(Argentina) Joaquin-Jesus Monteferrario (Brazil) Diego Matos
USA F25 Futures $10,000	September 29	Laguna Niguel, California; USA	Hard	(United States) Lester Cook	(United States) Colt Gaston (United States) Ryan Rowe
Venezuela F7 Futures $10,000	September 29	Barquisimeto; Venezuela	Clay	(Venezuela) José de Armas	(Venezuela) Piero Luisi (Venezuela) Roberto Maytín
Italy F33 Futures $10,000	September 29	Porto Torres; Italy	Clay	(Italy) Matteo Marrai	(Italy) Matteo Marrai (Italy) Walter Trusendi
Mexico F10 Futures $15,000	September 29	Monterrey; Mexico	Hard		
Ecuador F6 Futures $10,000	September 29	Quito; Ecuador	Clay	(Argentina) Cristhian Ignacio Benedetti	(Ecuador) Iván Endara (Ecuador) Walter Valarezo
Greece F6 Futures $10,000	September 29	Rethymno; Greece	Carpet	(Sweden) Daniel Danilović	(Romania) Ioan-Alexandru Cojanu (Republic of Ireland) James McGee
Portugal F7 Futures $15,000	September 29	Porto; Portugal	Clay	(Czech Republic) Jan Hájek	(Portugal) Nuno Marques (Portugal) Leonardo Tavares
Argentina F11 Futures $10,000	September 29	San Luis; Argentina	Clay	(Argentina) Gaston-Arturo Grimolizzi	(Argentina) Diego Cristin (Argentina) Jonathan Gonzalia

=== October ===
Tournament	Date	City	Surface	Singles champions	Doubles champions
Argentina F12 Futures $10,000	October 6	Mendoza; Argentina	Clay	(Argentina) Juan-Pablo Amado	(Argentina) Diego Cristin (Argentina) Gaston-Arturo Grimolizzi
Italy F34 Futures $10,000	October 6	Quartu Sant'Elena; Italy	Hard	(Italy) Thomas Fabbiano	(Italy) Fabio Colangelo (Italy) Matteo Volante
France F18 Futures $15,000	October 6	Saint-Dizier; France	Hard (i)	(Belgium) Niels Desein	(Belgium) Ruben Bemelmans (Belgium) Niels Desein
Germany F22 Futures $10,000	October 6	Leimen; Germany	Hard (i)	(Germany) Holger Fischer	(Czech Republic) Michal Navrátil (Canada) Vasek Pospisil
Portugal F8 Futures $15,000	October 6	Espinho; Portugal	Clay	(Slovakia) Marek Semjan	(Ukraine) Vladislav Bondarenko (Ukraine) Vladyslav Klymenko
Spain F38 Futures $10,000	October 6	Barcelona; Spain	Clay	(France) Laurent Rochette	(Spain) David Canudas-Fernandez (Spain) Oscar Sabate-Bretos
Australia F8 Futures $15,000	October 6	Traralgon; Australia	Hard	(Australia) John Millman	(Australia) Dane Propoggia (Australia) Matt Reid
Chile F1 Futures $10,000	October 6	Antofagasta; Chile	Clay	(Chile) Jorge Aguilar	(Uruguay) Federico Sansonetti (Argentina) Juan-Pablo Yunis
Ecuador F7 Futures $10,000	October 6	Ibarra; Ecuador	Clay	(Italy) Damiano Di Ienno	(Ecuador) Iván Endara (Ecuador) Walter Valarezo
Venezuela F8 Futures $10,000	October 6	Valencia; Venezuela	Hard	(Venezuela) José de Armas	(Colombia) Pablo González (Colombia) Alejandro González
Mexico F11 Futures $10,000	October 6	Torreón; Mexico	Hard	(United States) Matthew Roberts	(Mexico) Antonio Ruiz-Rosales (United States) Matthew Roberts
Morocco F6 Futures $15,000	October 6	Khemisset; Morocco	Clay	(Algeria) Lamine Ouahab	(Algeria) Lamine Ouahab (Morocco) Talal Ouahabi
Brazil F23 Futures $10,000	October 6	Uberaba; Brazil	Clay	(Argentina) Juan-Pablo Villar	(Brazil) Andre Pinheiro (Brazil) Fernando Romboli
Brazil F24 Futures $10,000	October 13	São Leopoldo; Brazil	Clay	(Brazil) Caio Zampieri	(Brazil) Fernando Romboli (Brazil) Renato Silveira
Japan F10 Futures $15,000	October 13	Kashiwa; Japan	Hard	(Japan) Tatsuma Ito	(Chinese Taipei) Yang Tsung-hua (Chinese Taipei) Yi Chu-huan
Morocco F7 Futures $15,000	October 13	Casablanca; Morocco	Clay	(Algeria) Lamine Ouahab	(Netherlands) Romano Frantzen (Netherlands) Nick van der Meer
Nigeria F3 Futures $15,000	October 13	Lagos; Nigeria	Hard	(Slovakia) Kamil Čapkovič	(India) Rohan Gajjar (India) Divij Sharan
Mexico F12 Futures $10,000	October 13	Mazatlán; Mexico	Hard	(Romania) Raian Luchici	(France) Fabrice Martin (Canada) Adil Shamasdin
Venezuela F9 Futures $10,000	October 13	Caracas; Venezuela	Hard	(Venezuela) José de Armas	(Venezuela) Piero Luisi (Venezuela) Roberto Maytín
Pakistan F1 Futures $10,000	October 13	Islamabad; Pakistan	Clay	(Russia) Mikhail Vasiliev	(Chinese Taipei) Chen I-ta (Chinese Taipei) Lee Hsin-han
Chile F2 Futures $10,000	October 13	Santiago; Chile	Clay	(Chile) Jorge Aguilar	(Romania) Cătălin-Ionuț Gârd (Latvia) Deniss Pavlovs
Australia F9 Futures $15,000	October 13	Sale; Australia	Clay	(Australia) Nick Lindahl	(Australia) Dane Propoggia (Australia) Matt Reid
France F19 Futures $15,000	October 13	La Roche-sur-Yon; France	Hard (i)	(Belgium) Niels Desein	(Morocco) Rabie Chaki (Georgia (country)) Lado Chikhladze
Germany F23 Futures $10,000	October 13	Isernhagen; Germany	Hard (i)	(Czech Republic) Robin Vik	(Czech Republic) Roman Jebavý (Poland) Grzegorz Panfil
Spain F39 Futures $10,000	October 13	Sabadell; Spain	Clay	(Spain) José Checa Calvo	(Spain) Íñigo Cervantes (Spain) Gerard Granollers
Croatia F10 Futures $15,000	October 13	Dubrovnik; Croatia	Clay	(Italy) Simone Vagnozzi	(Hungary) Attila Balázs (Israel) Amir Hadad
Argentina F13 Futures $10,000	October 13	San Juan; Argentina	Clay	(Argentina) Leandro Migani	(Argentina) Leandro Migani (Argentina) Agustin Picco
USA F26 Futures $15,000	October 13	Hammond, Louisiana; USA	Hard	(United States) Jean-Yves Aubone	(United States) Brett Joelson (United States) Bryan Wooten
USA F27 Futures $15,000	October 20	Mansfield, Texas; USA	Hard	(United States) Michael McClune	(Australia) Carsten Ball (Australia) Colin Ebelthite
Mexico F13 Futures $10,000	October 20	Ciudad Obregón, Sonora; Mexico	Hard	(Mexico) César Ramírez	(France) Fabrice Martin (Canada) Adil Shamasdin
France F20 Futures $10,000	October 20	Rodez; France	Hard (i)	(United Kingdom) James Ward	(France) Jeremy Blandin (France) Mathieu Rodrigues
Spain F40 Futures $10,000	October 20	Saint Cugat; Spain	Clay	(Croatia) Antonio Šančić	(Australia) Miles Armstrong (Cyprus) Photos Kallias
Croatia F11 Futures $15,000	October 20	Dubrovnik; Croatia	Clay	(Slovenia) Janez Semrajc	(Hungary) Attila Balázs (Israel) Amir Hadad
Great Britain F16 Futures $10,000	October 20	Glasgow; Great Britain	Hard (i)	(United Kingdom) Dan Evans	(United Kingdom) Colin Fleming (United Kingdom) Ken Skupski
South Africa F1 Futures $15,000	October 20	Pretoria; South Africa	Hard	(South Africa) Raven Klaasen	(Germany) Alexander Satschko (Germany) Marc-Andre Stratling
Australia F10 Futures $15,000	October 20	Happy Valley; Australia	Hard	(Australia) Marinko Matosevic	(Australia) Adam Hubble (Australia) Kaden Hensel
Chile F3 Futures $10,000	October 20	Santiago; Chile	Clay	(Argentina) Diego Álvarez	(Romania) Cătălin-Ionuț Gârd (Latvia) Deniss Pavlovs
Pakistan F2 Futures $10,000	October 20	Islamabad; Pakistan	Clay	(Kazakhstan) Syrym Abdukhalikov	(Chinese Taipei) Chen I-ta (Chinese Taipei) Lee Hsin-han
Nigeria F4 Futures $15,000	October 20	Lagos; Nigeria	Hard	(Slovakia) Kamil Čapkovič	(Slovakia) Kamil Čapkovič (Netherlands) Boy Westerhof
Japan F11 Futures $15,000	October 20	Tokyo; Japan	Hard	(Japan) Yūichi Sugita	(Japan) Yaoki Ishii (Japan) Hiroki Kondo
Brazil F25 Futures $10,000	October 20	Porto Alegre; Brazil	Clay	(Brazil) Henrique Cunha	(Brazil) Rafael Camilo (Brazil) Diego Matos
Brazil F26 Futures $10,000	October 27	Porto Alegre; Brazil	Clay	(Brazil) Daniel Dutra da Silva	(Brazil) Rafael Camilo (Brazil) Rodrigo Guidolin
Pakistan F3 Futures $10,000	October 27	Lahore; Pakistan	Hard	(Germany) Patrick Taubert	(South Korea) Lim Hyun-soo (India) Rupesh Roy
Chile F4 Futures $10,000	October 27	Santiago; Chile	Clay	(Chile) Julio Peralta	(Switzerland) Mathieu Guenat (Chile) Julio Peralta
South Africa F2 Futures $15,000	October 27	Pretoria; South Africa	Hard	(Germany) Alexander Satschko	(France) Philippe De Bonnevie (Germany) Martin Emmrich
Spain F41 Futures $10,000	October 27	Vilafranca; Spain	Clay	(Spain) José Checa Calvo	(Greece) Alexandros Jakupovic (Spain) Gabriel Trujillo Soler
Great Britain F17 Futures $10,000	October 27	Campden Hill; Great Britain	Hard (i)	(United Kingdom) Richard Bloomfield	(United Kingdom) Colin Fleming (United Kingdom) Ken Skupski
Mexico F14 Futures $10,000	October 27	Ciudad Obregón, Sonora; Mexico	Hard	(Switzerland) Michael Lammer	(Italy) Claudio Grassi (Mexico) Antonio Ruiz-Rosales
Argentina F14 Futures $10,000	October 27	Buenos Aires; Argentina	Clay	(Argentina) Juan-Martín Aranguren	(Argentina) Andrés Molteni (Argentina) Guido Pella

=== November ===
Tournament	Date	City	Surface	Singles champions	Doubles champions
Argentina F15 Futures $10,000	November 3	Bahía Blanca; Argentina	Clay	(Argentina) Marco Trungelliti	(Argentina) Diego Cristin (Argentina) Gaston-Arturo Grimolizzi
USA F28 Futures $15,000	November 3	Kohala Coast; USA	Hard	(South Korea) Daniel Yoo	(United States) Todd Paul (United States) Chris Wettengel
Mexico F15 Futures $10,000	November 3	Guadalajara; Mexico	Clay	(Switzerland) Michael Lammer	(Mexico) Víctor Romero (Mexico) Bruno Rodríguez
Spain F42 Futures $15,000	November 3	Las Palmas de Gran Canaria; Spain	Hard	(Belgium) Yannick Mertens	(Spain) Gerard Granollers (Spain) Andoni Vivanco-Guzmán
Great Britain F18 Futures $10,000	November 3	Sunderland; Great Britain	Hard (i)	(United Kingdom) Colin Fleming	(United Kingdom) Colin Fleming (United Kingdom) Ken Skupski
Peru F4 Futures $15,000	November 3	Lima; Peru	Clay	(Chile) Jorge Aguilar	(Romania) Cătălin-Ionuț Gârd (Latvia) Deniss Pavlovs
Chile F5 Futures $10,000	November 3	Santiago; Chile	Clay	(Chile) Julio Peralta	(Argentina) Gaston Giussani (Argentina) Joaquin-Jesus Monteferrario
Iran F5 Futures $15,000	November 3	Kish Island; Iran	Clay	(Croatia) Antonio Veić	(Monaco) Benjamin Balleret (Kuwait) Mohammad Ghareeb
Brazil F27 Futures $10,000	November 3	Porto Alegre; Brazil	Clay	(Brazil) Júlio Silva	(Brazil) Júlio Silva (Brazil) Rogério Dutra Silva
Malaysia F1 Futures $15,000	November 3	Kuala Lumpur; Malaysia	Hard	(South Korea) Im Kyu-tae	(Indonesia) Christopher Rungkat (United States) Nathan Thompson
Malaysia F2 Futures $15,000	November 10	Petaling Jaya, Selangor; Malaysia	Hard	(South Korea) Im Kyu-tae	(New Zealand) Mikal Statham (China) Yu Xinyuan
Brazil F28 Futures $10,000	November 10	Guarulhos; Brazil	Clay	(Brazil) Júlio Silva	(Brazil) Júlio Silva (Brazil) Rogério Dutra Silva
Iran F6 Futures $15,000	November 10	Kish Island; Iran	Clay	(Russia) Valery Rudnev	(Germany) Alexander Satschko (Germany) Marc-Andre Stratling
Peru F5 Futures $15,000	November 10	Lima; Peru	Clay	(Argentina) Juan-Martín Aranguren	(Argentina) Alejandro Kon (Argentina) Leandro Migani
Spain F43 Futures $15,000	November 10	Maspalomas; Spain	Clay	(Italy) Andrea Arnaboldi	(Spain) Agustin Boje-Ordonez (Spain) Andoni Vivanco-Guzmán
Mexico F16 Futures $10,000	November 10	Querétaro; Mexico	Hard	(United States) Kaes Van't Hof	(United States) Rylan Rizza (United States) Kaes Van't Hof
USA F29 Futures $15,000	November 10	Honolulu; USA	Hard	(Netherlands) Igor Sijsling	(United States) James Ludlow (Sweden) Andreas Siljeström
Argentina F16 Futures $10,000	November 10	Neuquén; Argentina	Clay	(Argentina) Nicolas Jara-Lozano	(Argentina) Andrés Molteni (Argentina) Guido Pella
Gabon F1 Futures $15,000	November 17	Libreville; Gabon	Hard	(South Africa) Raven Klaasen	(Germany) Martin Emmrich (South Africa) Raven Klaasen
Israel F4 Futures $15,000	November 17	Ramat HaSharon; Israel	Hard	(Austria) Andreas Haider-Maurer	(Germany) Bastian Knittel (Austria) Max Raditschnigg
United Arab Emirates F1 Futures $15,000	November 17	Dubai; United Arab Emirates	Hard	(Switzerland) Marco Chiudinelli	(Switzerland) Marco Chiudinelli (Slovakia) Ivo Klec
India F8 Futures $15,000	November 17	Mumbai; India	Hard	(United States) Nathan Thompson	(India) Rohan Gajjar (India) Purav Raja
Brazil F29 Futures $10,000	November 17	Bauru; Brazil	Clay	(Brazil) João Souza	(Brazil) Rafael Camilo (Brazil) Rodrigo Guidolin
Nicaragua F1 Futures $15,000	November 17	Managua; Nicaragua	Hard	(Latvia) Deniss Pavlovs	(Czech Republic) Jiří Krkoška (Canada) Vasek Pospisil
Dominican Republic F1 Futures $10,000	November 17	Santo Domingo; Dominican Republic	Hard	(Austria) Nikolaus Moser	(Germany) Nils Langer (Germany) Frank Wintermantel
Dominican Republic F2 Futures $10,000	November 24	Santo Domingo; Dominican Republic	Hard	(Netherlands) Igor Sijsling	(Belgium) David Goffin (Czech Republic) Radim Žitko
Brazil F30 Futures $10,000	November 24	São Paulo; Brazil	Clay	(Brazil) Leonardo Kirche	(Brazil) Eric Gomes (Brazil) Tiago Lopes
El Salvador F2 Futures $15,000	November 24	La Libertad; El Salvador	Clay	(Chile) Hans Podlipnik Castillo	(Colombia) Michael Quintero (Colombia) Carlos Salamanca
India F9 Futures $15,000	November 24	Kolkata; India	Clay	(Germany) Alexander Satschko	(India) Rupesh Roy (India) Sunil-Kumar Sipaeya
United Arab Emirates F2 Futures $15,000	November 24	Fujairah; United Arab Emirates	Hard	(Sweden) Filip Prpic	(Ukraine) Denys Molchanov (Ukraine) Ivan Sergeyev
Uruguay F1 Futures $10,000	November 24	Montevideo; Uruguay	Clay	(Argentina) Agustin Picco	(Argentina) Gustavo Sterin (Argentina) Agustin Tarantino
Israel F5 Futures $15,000	November 24	Ramat HaSharon; Israel	Hard	(Austria) Andreas Haider-Maurer	(Canada) Pierre-Ludovic Duclos (Israel) Amir Hadad
Gabon F2 Futures $15,000	November 24	Libreville; Gabon	Hard	(Slovakia) Kamil Čapkovič	(Germany) Andre Begemann (Germany) Martin Emmrich
Australia F11 Futures $15,000	November 24	Perth; Australia	Hard	(Australia) Andrew Coelho	(Australia) Adam Hubble (Australia) Kaden Hensel

=== December ===
Tournament	Date	City	Surface	Singles champions	Doubles champions
Australia F12 Futures $15,000	December 1	Sorrento, Western Australia; Australia	Hard	(Australia) Marinko Matosevic	(Australia) Adam Hubble (Australia) Kaden Hensel
Argentina F17 Futures $10,000	December 1	Tucumán; Argentina	Clay	(Argentina) Alejandro Fabbri	(Argentina) Andrés Molteni (Argentina) Guido Pella
Dominican Republic F3 Futures $10,000	December 1	Santo Domingo; Dominican Republic	Hard	(Austria) Philipp Oswald	(Ukraine) Ivan Anikanov (Austria) Philipp Oswald
Dominican Republic F4 Futures $10,000	December 8	Santo Domingo; Dominican Republic	Hard	(Dominican Republic) Víctor Estrella Burgos	(Netherlands) Antal van der Duim (Netherlands) Tim Van Terheijden
Brazil F32 Futures $10,000	December 8	Foz do Iguaçu; Brazil	Clay	(Brazil) Júlio Silva	(Argentina) Gaston Giussani (Argentina) Joaquin-Jesus Monteferrario
Argentina F18 Futures $10,000	December 8	Salta; Argentina	Clay	(Argentina) Leandro Migani	(Argentina) Facundo Bagnis (Argentina) Leandro Migani
Czech Rep. F5 Futures $15,000	December 8	Frýdlant nad Ostravicí; Czech Republic	Hard (i)	(Czech Republic) Robin Vik	(United Kingdom) Colin Fleming (United Kingdom) Jonathan Marray
Czech Rep. F6 Futures $15,000	December 15	Opava; Czech Republic	Carpet (i)	(Czech Republic) Jan Mertl	(United Kingdom) Colin Fleming (United Kingdom) Jonathan Marray
Brazil F33 Futures $10,000	December 15	São Paulo; Brazil	Hard (i)	(Brazil) Eric Gomes	(United States) Nikita Kryvonos (Bulgaria) Vasko Mladenov
Dominican Republic F5 Futures $10,000	December 15	Santo Domingo; Dominican Republic	Hard	(Dominican Republic) Víctor Estrella Burgos	(Dominican Republic) Víctor Estrella Burgos (Dominican Republic) Jhonson García
Brazil F34 Futures $10,000	December 22	São Paulo; Brazil	Hard (i)	(Brazil) Eric Gomes	(Germany) Mario Eckardt (Germany) Patrick Taubert
Brazil F35 Futures $15,000	December 29	São Paulo; Brazil	Hard	(Brazil) Daniel Dutra da Silva	(Bulgaria) Vasko Mladenov (Germany) Lars Pörschke
