= 2008 Davis Cup Asia/Oceania Zone Group II =

International tennis competition

The Asia/Oceania Zone was one of the three zones of the regional Davis Cup competition in 2008.

In the Asia/Oceania Zone there were four tiers, called groups, in which teams compete against each other to advance to the upper tier. Winners in Group II advanced to the Asia/Oceania Zone Group I. Teams who lost their respective ties competed in the relegation play-offs, with winning teams remaining in Group II, whereas teams who lost their play-offs were relegated to the Asia/Oceania Zone Group III in 2009.

== Participating nations ==
- China
- Hong Kong
- Indonesia
- Kuwait
- Lebanon
- New Zealand
- Oman
- Pacific Oceania

=== Draw ===
Play-offs
Hong Kong, China (hard)
Lebanon	2
Hong Kong	3
Muscat, Oman (hard)
Oman	3
Pacific Oceania	2

First Round
Beijing, China (indoor hard)
1	China	5
Lebanon	0
Jakarta, Indonesia (hard)
3	Indonesia	3
Hong Kong	2
Muscat, Oman (hard)
Oman	0
4	New Zealand	5
Mishref, Kuwait (hard)
Pacific Oceania	1
2	Kuwait	4

Second Round
Jakarta, Indonesia (hard)
1	China	3
3	Indonesia	2
Mishref, Kuwait (hard)
4	New Zealand	5
2	Kuwait	0

Third Round
New Plymouth, New Zealand (indoor hard)
1	China	3
4	New Zealand	2

- Lebanon and Pacific Oceania relegated to Group III in 2009.
- China promoted to Group I in 2009.

== First round ==
=== China vs. Lebanon ===
China
5
Beijing National Tennis Centre, Beijing, China
8–10 February 2008
Hard (indoors)

Lebanon
0

			1	2	3	4	5
1	(China) (Lebanon)	Yu Xinyuan; Karim Alayli	6; 2	6; 4	3; 6	7; 5
2	(China) (Lebanon)	Sun Peng; Jicham Zaatini	6; 1	6; 1	6; 0
3	(China) (Lebanon)	Yu Xinyuan / Zeng Shaoxuan; Patrick Chucri / Jicham Zaatini	6; 2	7^{7} 6^{4}	6; 2
4	(China) (Lebanon)	Li Zhe; Karim Alayli	6; 3	6; 4
5	(China) (Lebanon)	Yu Xinyuan; Rami Osman	6; 2	6; 0

=== Indonesia vs. Hong Kong ===
Indonesia
3
Gelora Bung Karno Tennis Stadium, Jakarta, Indonesia
8–10 February 2008
Hard

Hong Kong
2

			1	2	3	4	5
1	(Indonesia) (Hong Kong)	Elbert Sie; Martin Sayer	0; 6	4; 6	6^{4} 7^{7}
2	(Indonesia) (Hong Kong)	Christopher Rungkat; Goran Bosalevski	6; 2	6; 2	6; 1
3	(Indonesia) (Hong Kong)	Christopher Rungkat / Andery Styawanto; Michael Lai / Martin Sayer	6; 3	6; 4	3; 6	7; 5
4	(Indonesia) (Hong Kong)	Elbert Sie; Yu Hiu Tung	6; 4	2; 6	6; 3	3; 6	6; 3
5	(Indonesia) (Hong Kong)	Ayrton Wibowo; Michael Lai	2; 6	6; 3	3; 6

=== Oman vs. New Zealand ===
Oman
0
Sultan Qaboos Sports Complex, Muscat, Oman
8–10 February 2008
Hard

New Zealand
5

			1	2	3	4	5
1	(Oman) (New Zealand)	Khalid Al Nabhani; GD Jones	3; 6	2; 6	0; 6
2	(Oman) (New Zealand)	Mohammed Al Nabhani; Daniel King-Turner	3; 6	4; 6	2; 6
3	(Oman) (New Zealand)	Khalid Al Nabhani / Mohammed Al Nabhani; Daniel King-Turner / Jose Statham	6; 3	7^{7} 6^{2}	3; 6	2; 6	1; 6
4	(Oman) (New Zealand)	Khalid Al Nabhani; Daniel King-Turner	0; 6	1; 6
5	(Oman) (New Zealand)	Mohammed Al Nabhani; GD Jones	1; 6	5; 7

=== Kuwait vs. Pacific Oceania ===
Kuwait
4
Bassam Al-Motawa Tennis Center, Mishref, Kuwait
8–10 February 2008
Hard

Pacific Oceania
1

			1	2	3	4	5
1	(Kuwait) (Pacific Oceania)	Mohammad Ghareeb; Juan Sebastien Langton	6; 1	6; 1	6; 2
2	(Kuwait) (Pacific Oceania)	Abdullah Maqdes; Michael Leong	6; 1	6; 1	6; 4
3	(Kuwait) (Pacific Oceania)	Mohammad Ghareeb / Mohammad-Khaliq Siddiq; Cyril Jacobe / Michael Leong	6; 2	6; 2	6; 2
4	(Kuwait) (Pacific Oceania)	Ali Ghareeb; Michael Leong	4; 6	5; 7
5	(Kuwait) (Pacific Oceania)	Abdullah Maqdes; Juan Sebastien Langton	7^{7} 6^{2}	6; 4

== Second round ==
=== Indonesia vs. China ===
Indonesia
2
Gelora Bung Karno Tennis Stadium, Jakarta, Indonesia
11–13 April 2008
Hard

China
3

			1	2	3	4	5
1	(Indonesia) (China)	Ayrton Wibowo; Bai Yan	3; 6	1; 6	5; 7
2	(Indonesia) (China)	Christopher Rungkat; Li Zhe	3; 6	1; 6	1; 6
3	(Indonesia) (China)	Ketut-Nesa Arta / Christopher Rungkat; Gong Maoxin / Li Zhe	6^{1} 7^{7}	6; 4	2; 6	6; 3	9; 7
4	(Indonesia) (China)	Christopher Rungkat; Bai Yan	1; 6	4; 6	6; 1	0; 6
5	(Indonesia) (China)	Aditya Harry Sasongko; Gao Wan	6; 4	7^{7} 6^{5}

=== Kuwait vs. New Zealand ===
Kuwait
0
Bassam Al-Motowa Tennis Center, Mishref, Kuwait
11–13 April 2008
Hard

New Zealand
5

			1	2	3	4	5
1	(Kuwait) (New Zealand)	Ahmad Rabeea Muhammad; Daniel King-Turner	4; 6	1; 6	1; 6
2	(Kuwait) (New Zealand)	Mohammad Ghareeb; Jose Statham	3; 6	2; 6	3; 6
3	(Kuwait) (New Zealand)	Mohammad Ghareeb / Mohammad-Khaliq Siddiq; GD Jones / Daniel King-Turner	2; 6	4; 6	4; 6
4	(Kuwait) (New Zealand)	Ali Ismaeel; Mark Nielsen	4; 6	2; 6
5	(Kuwait) (New Zealand)	Ahmad Rabeea Muhammad; Jose Statham	1; 6	1; 6

== Relegation play-offs ==
=== Hong Kong vs. Lebanon ===
Hong Kong
3
Chinese Recreation Club, Tai Hang, Hong Kong, China
11–13 April 2008
Hard

Lebanon
2

			1	2	3	4	5
1	(Hong Kong) (Lebanon)	Yu Hiu Tung; Jicham Zaatini	7^{7} 6^{2}	7^{7} 6^{2}	6^{1} 7^{7}	6; 0
2	(Hong Kong) (Lebanon)	Michael Lai; Karim Alayli	2; 6	2; 6	6; 3	6; 3	7; 9
3	(Hong Kong) (Lebanon)	Adrian Montesinos / Henry So; Karim Alayli / Jicham Zaatini	7^{7} 6^{4}	6; 4	3; 6	6^{7} 7^{9}	4; 6
4	(Hong Kong) (Lebanon)	Yu Hiu Tung; Karim Alayli	6; 2	6; 3	6; 3
5	(Hong Kong) (Lebanon)	Michael Lai; Ibrahim Abou Chahine	6; 1	6; 1	6; 2

=== Oman vs. Pacific Oceania ===
Oman
3
Sultan Qaboos Sports Complex, Muscat, Oman
11–13 April 2008
Hard

Pacific Oceania
2

			1	2	3	4	5
1	(Oman) (Pacific Oceania)	Khalid Al Nabhani; Michael Leong	6; 1	7^{7} 6^{3}	6; 4
2	(Oman) (Pacific Oceania)	Mohammed Al Nabhani; Juan Sebastien Langton	7; 5	6; 2	4; 6	4; 6	6; 2
3	(Oman) (Pacific Oceania)	Khalid Al Nabhani / Mohammed Al Nabhani; Brett Baudinet / Cyril Jacobe	7^{7} 6^{3}	5; 7	3; 6	7^{7} 6^{3}	6; 4
4	(Oman) (Pacific Oceania)	Mohammed Al Nabhani; Michael Leong	7^{7} 6^{3}	3; 6	3; 6
5	(Oman) (Pacific Oceania)	Sulaiman Al Rawahi; Juan Sebastien Langton	1; 6	4; 6

== Third round ==
=== New Zealand vs. China ===
New Zealand
2
TSB Stadium, New Plymouth, New Zealand
19–21 September 2008
Hard (indoors)

China
3

			1	2	3	4	5
1	(New Zealand) (China)	Jose Statham; Bai Yan	4; 6	6; 3	6; 4	6; 2
2	(New Zealand) (China)	Daniel King-Turner; Sun Peng	6; 3	6; 2	6; 4
3	(New Zealand) (China)	GD Jones / Daniel King-Turner; Yu Xinyuan / Zeng Shaoxuan	2; 6	4; 6	7; 5	4; 6
4	(New Zealand) (China)	Daniel King-Turner; Bai Yan	4; 6	3; 6	3; 6
5	(New Zealand) (China)	GD Jones; Sun Peng	3; 6	7^{7} 6^{4}	5; 7	6; 4	3; 6
