= 2009 Davis Cup Asia/Oceania Zone Group II =

International tennis competition

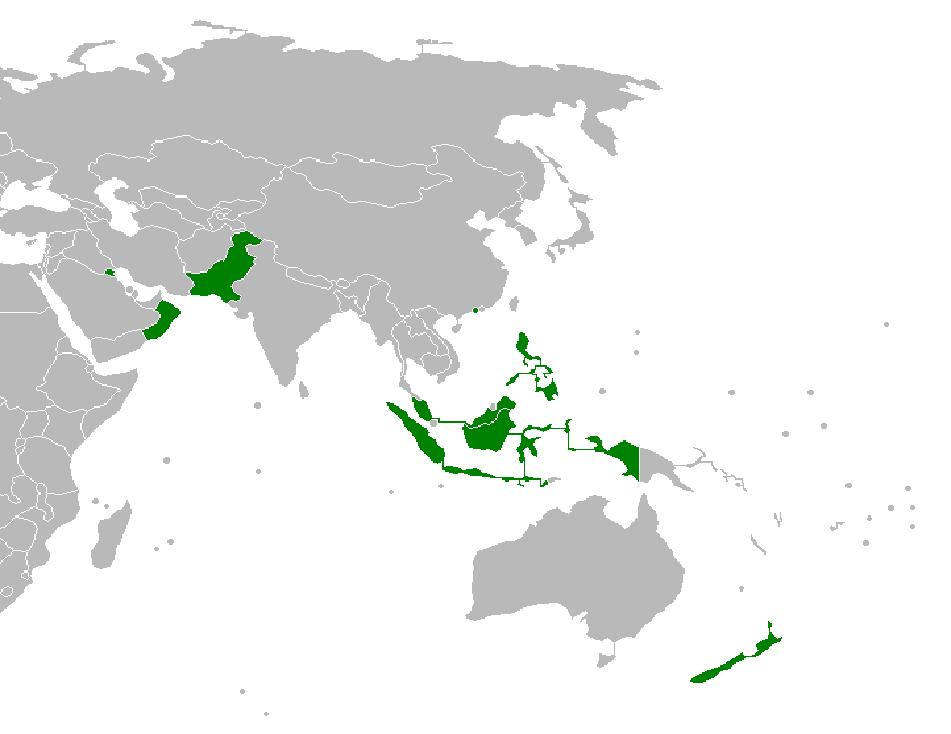
Countries participating in the 2009 Davis Cup Asia/Oceania Zone Group II

The Asian and Oceanian Zone is one of the three zones of regional Davis Cup competition in 2009.

In the Asian and Oceanian Zone there are four different groups in which teams compete against each other to advance to the next group.

== Participating teams ==
- Hong Kong
- Indonesia
- Kuwait
- Malaysia
- New Zealand
- Oman
- Pakistan
- Philippines

== Draw ==
Play-offs
Hong Kong
Hong Kong	5
Oman	0
Kuala Lumpur, Malaysia
3	Kuwait	1
Malaysia	4

First Round
Hong Kong Island, Hong Kong
1	Philippines	4
Hong Kong	1
Muscat, Oman
4	Pakistan	4
Oman	1
Surakarta, Indonesia
Indonesia	3
3	Kuwait	2
North Shore City, New Zealand
Malaysia	0
2	New Zealand	5

Second Round
Manila, Philippines
1	Philippines	3
4	Pakistan	2
Hamilton, New Zealand
Indonesia	0
2	New Zealand	5

Third Round
Manila, Philippines
1	Philippines	4
2	New Zealand	1

- Oman and Kuwait relegated to Group III in 2010.
- Philippines promoted to Group I in 2010.

== First Round Matches ==
=== Philippines vs. Hong Kong ===
Philippines
4
Victoria Park, Hong Kong, Hong Kong
6–8 March 2009
hard (outdoors)

Hong Kong
1

			1	2	3	4	5
1	(Philippines) (Hong Kong)	Treat Conrad Huey; Martin Sayer	4; 6	6^{0} 7^{7}	2; 6
2	(Philippines) (Hong Kong)	Cecil Mamiit; Hiu-Tung Yu	7^{7} 6^{2}	6; 1	6; 1
3	(Philippines) (Hong Kong)	Treat Conrad Huey / Cecil Mamiit; Brian Hung / Martin Sayer	7; 5	6; 3	7^{7} 6^{5}
4	(Philippines) (Hong Kong)	Cecil Mamiit; Martin Sayer	6; 4	4; 6	3; 6	7^{7} 6^{5}	9; 7
5	(Philippines) (Hong Kong)	Francis Casey Alcantara; Michael Lai	6; 4	6; 4

=== Pakistan vs. Oman ===
Pakistan
4
Sultan Qaboos Sports Complex, Muscat, Oman
6–8 March 2009
hard (outdoors)

Oman
1

			1	2	3	4	5
1	(Pakistan) (Oman)	Aisam Qureshi; Khalid Al Nabhani	6; 2	6; 3	6; 2
2	(Pakistan) (Oman)	Aqeel Khan; Mohammed Al Nabhani	4; 6	6^{5} 7^{7}	6; 4	6; 3	6; 1
3	(Pakistan) (Oman)	Aqeel Khan / Aisam Qureshi; Khalid Al Nabhani / Mohammed Al Nabhani	6; 4	6; 2	5; 7	6; 2
4	(Pakistan) (Oman)	Yasir Khan; Mohammed Al Nabhani	2; 6	4; 6
5	(Pakistan) (Oman)	Jalil Khan; Khalid Al Nabhani	6; 4	7^{7} 6^{2}

=== Indonesia vs. Kuwait ===
Indonesia
3
Gor Manahan Tennis Centre, Surakarta, Indonesia
6–8 March 2009
hard (outdoors)

Kuwait
2

			1	2	3	4	5
1	(Indonesia) (Kuwait)	Christopher Rungkat; Ahmad Rabeea Muhammad	6; 2	6; 3	6; 2
2	(Indonesia) (Kuwait)	Sunu Wahyu Trijati; Mohammed Ghareeb	1; 6	4; 6	6^{2} 7^{7}
3	(Indonesia) (Kuwait)	Nesa Arta / Christopher Rungkat; Mohammed Ghareeb / Mohammad-Khaliq Siddiq	3; 6	6; 1	6; 3	6; 0
4	(Indonesia) (Kuwait)	Christopher Rungkat; Mohammed Ghareeb	5; 7	1; 6	6; 2	7^{8} 6^{6}	3; 6
5	(Indonesia) (Kuwait)	Prima Simpatiaji; Mohammad-Khaliq Siddiq	6; 4	6; 0	6; 2

=== Malaysia vs. New Zealand ===
Malaysia
0
Albany Tennis Park, North Shore City, New Zealand
6–8 March 2009
hard (indoors)

New Zealand
5

			1	2	3	4	5
1	(Malaysia) (New Zealand)	Razlan Rawi; Jose Statham	1; 6	1; 6	0; 6
2	(Malaysia) (New Zealand)	Si Yew Ming; Daniel King-Turner	4; 6	1; 6	4; 6
3	(Malaysia) (New Zealand)	Adam Jaya / Si Yew Ming; G.D. Jones / Daniel King-Turner	1; 6	4; 6	2; 6
4	(Malaysia) (New Zealand)	Adam Jaya; G.D. Jones	3; 6	3; 6
5	(Malaysia) (New Zealand)	Abd-Hazli Bin Zainuddin; Adam Thompson	0; 6	2; 6

== Play-offs ==
=== Hong Kong vs. Oman ===
Hong Kong
5
Chinese Recreation Club, Hong Kong
10–12 July 2009
hard (outdoors)

Oman
0

			1	2	3	4	5
1	(Hong Kong) (Oman)	Hiu-Tung Yu; Khalid Al Nabhani	6; 3	6; 0	6; 1
2	(Hong Kong) (Oman)	Martin Sayer; Mohammed Al Nabhani	6; 1	7; 5	6; 3
3	(Hong Kong) (Oman)	Cheuk-Wai Hui / Brian Hung; Khalid Al Nabhani / Mohammed Al Nabhani	6; 2	6; 3	6; 3
4	(Hong Kong) (Oman)	Cheuk-Wai Hui; Mohammed Al Nabhani	6; 0	6; 4
5	(Hong Kong) (Oman)	Brian Hung; Sulaiman Al Rawahi	6; 1	6; 1

=== Kuwait vs. Malaysia ===
Kuwait
1
National Tennis Center, Kuala Lumpur, Malaysia
10–12 July 2009
hard (indoors)

Malaysia
4

			1	2	3	4	5
1	(Kuwait) (Malaysia)	Ahmad Rabeea Muhammad; Si Yew Ming	1; 6	4; 6	3; 6
2	(Kuwait) (Malaysia)	Mohammed Ghareeb; Razlan Rawi	6; 1	2; 6	6; 4	6; 4
3	(Kuwait) (Malaysia)	Ahmad Rabeea Muhammad / Musaad Al Jazzaf; Si Yew Ming / Selvam Veerasingam	6^{5} 7^{7}	6; 2	3; 6	2; 6
4	(Kuwait) (Malaysia)	Hassan Al Mousa; Si Yew Ming	2; 6	1; 6	1; 6
5	(Kuwait) (Malaysia)	Ahmad Rabeea Muhammad; Razlan Rawi	walkover

== Second Round Matches ==
=== Philippines vs. Pakistan ===
Philippines
3
Philippine Columbian Association, Manila, Philippines
10–12 July 2009
clay (indoors)

Pakistan
2

			1	2	3	4	5
1	(Philippines) (Pakistan)	Treat Conrad Huey; Aqeel Khan	7; 5	6; 4	6; 2
2	(Philippines) (Pakistan)	Cecil Mamiit; Jalil Khan	6; 1	6; 2	6; 1
3	(Philippines) (Pakistan)	Treat Conrad Huey / Cecil Mamiit; Jibran Mohammadi / Aqeel Khan	6; 2	6; 4	6; 0
4	(Philippines) (Pakistan)	Patrick-John Tierro; Aqeel Khan	1; 6	6^{7} 7^{9}
5	(Philippines) (Pakistan)	Francis Casey Alcantara; Jalil Khan	6; 1	6^{8} 7^{10}	3; 6

=== Indonesia vs. New Zealand ===
Indonesia
0
Perry Arena Indoor Stadium, Hamilton, New Zealand
10–12 July 2009
hard (indoors)

New Zealand
5

			1	2	3	4	5
1	(Indonesia) (New Zealand)	Sunu-Wahya Trijati; Daniel King-Turner	4; 6	1; 6	4; 6
2	(Indonesia) (New Zealand)	Christopher Rungkat; G.D. Jones	5; 7	6; 4	3; 6	2; 6
3	(Indonesia) (New Zealand)	Nesa Arta / Christopher Rungkat; G.D. Jones / Daniel King-Turner	6; 4	5; 7	6^{4} 7^{7}	4; 6
4	(Indonesia) (New Zealand)	Ayrton Wibowo; Daniel King-Turner	4; 6	1; 6
5	(Indonesia) (New Zealand)	Sunu-Wahyu Trijati; Mikal Statham	1; 6	0; 6

== Third Round Matches ==
=== Philippines vs. New Zealand ===
Philippines
4
Philippine Columbian Association, Manila, Philippines
18–20 September 2009
clay (indoors)

New Zealand
1

			1	2	3	4	5
1	(Philippines) (New Zealand)	Treat Conrad Huey; Daniel King-Turner	6; 4	6^{5} 7^{7}	6; 0			retired
2	(Philippines) (New Zealand)	Cecil Mamiit; Jose Statham	6; 4	7; 5	6; 2
3	(Philippines) (New Zealand)	Treat Conrad Huey / Cecil Mamiit; G.D. Jones / Mikal Statham	7^{7} 6^{4}	6; 3	7; 5
4	(Philippines) (New Zealand)	Johnny Arcilla; Jose Statham	6; 3	2; 6	6; 4
5	(Philippines) (New Zealand)	Vicente Anasta; Jose Statham	1; 6	5; 7
