= Martin Sayer =

Hong Kong tennis player

- Country (sports): Hong Kong
- Born: June 20, 1987
- Died: July 25, 2023 (aged 36)
- Plays: Right-handed

Singles
- Career record: 8–3 (Davis Cup)
- Highest ranking: No. 1303 (October 4, 2004)

Doubles
- Career record: 7–2 (Davis Cup)
- Highest ranking: No. 1336 (August 22, 2005)

Martin Christopher Sayer (Chinese: 施馬田, June 20, 1987-July 25, 2023) was a Hong Kong tennis player. He was 1.85m and weighed 89 kg. Sayer was a member of the Hong Kong Davis Cup team, compiling a 15-3 record in Davis Cup between 2005-2011.

Sayer studied and received his BSc and MBA from Radford University, Virginia and competed in NCAA competitions during the 2005-09 period. In the 2008-09 Season, Sayer reached 100 wins in singles on February 8, 2009 and he won the NCAA Men's Division I Big South Conference Player of the Year Award for three consecutive years, from 2006 to 2008.

From the Davis Cup official website, Sayer and Brian Hung are the most successful doubles team in the Davis Cup of Hong Kong. They competed in a 4-1 win-loss result. On March 8, 2009, Sayer played against Cecil Mamiit of the Philippines in the Davis Cup Asia/Oceania Group II first round. Mamiit won the match 6-4 4-6 3-6 7-6 9-7, the 58 games making it the longest match in the history of the Hong Kong Davis Cup team.

Martin Sayer was a member of the "dream team" at Radford University and was later a coach there. His last post was assistant coach at Virginia Tech from 2016 until his death in 2023.

He died in his sleep on July 25, 2023 in America of a gastrointestinal hemorrhage at the age of 36. He left behind a wife and a son.
