= Sergei Demekhine =

Russian tennis coach and former player

Sergei Demekhine Сергей Демёхин
- Country (sports): Russia
- Residence: Moscow, Russia
- Born: 30 March 1984 (age 41) Kursk, Russian SFSR, Soviet Union
- Height: 1.92 m (6 ft 3 1/2 in)
- Turned pro: 2001
- Retired: 2009 (last match played)
- Plays: Right–handed
- Prize money: $25,848

Singles
- Career record: 37–52
- Career titles: 1 ITF
- Highest ranking: No. 673 (30 July 2007)

Doubles
- Career record: 106–69
- Career titles: 8 ITF
- Highest ranking: No. 438 (17 October 2005)

Sergei Gennadievitch Demekhine (Russian: Сергей Геннадьевич Демёхин; born 30 March 1984) is a Russian tennis coach and a former professional player.

== Personal life ==
Demekhine was born on 30 March 1984 in Kursk and currently resides in Moscow.

Demekhine occasionally used to work as a model for Armani, Rocco Barocco, and Abercrombie & Fitch.

Since 2017, he has been married to Russian tennis player Veronika Kudermetova, whom he also coaches.

== Tennis career ==
As a professional tennis player, Demekhine won one ITF Futures title in singles, and eight in doubles. He played the qualifications for the Kremlin Cup in 2001, 2002, 2003 2006 and 2008, but never reached the main draw. Demekhin made two appearances in a ATP Tour main draw in doubles, both at the Kremlin Cup. In 2005, he and Igor Kunitsyn lost to Mariusz Fyrstenberg and Răzvan Sabău 3–5, 4–5 in the first round. In 2008, Demekhin partnered with Konstantin Kravchuk, but they were beaten by Sergiy Stakhovsky and Potito Starace 7–6^{(4)}, 1–6, [10–7] in the first round. He has been inactive since he played his last match in 2009.

== Coaching career ==
Demekhine briefly coached Russian player Alla Kudryavtseva.

He then coached Vera Zvonareva. The two began working together in April 2010 after the 2010 Family Circle Cup in Charleston, South Carolina. At first, he was her hitting partner and then became her coach. Under his guidance, Zvonareva reached the finals of the 2010 Wimbledon Championships and the 2010 US Open, the semifinals of the 2011 Australian Open, and the world No. 2 ranking. In April 2011, Vera Zvonareva split with Demekhine.

He is currently coaching his wife Veronika Kudermetova.

== Career statistics ==
=== IFT Futures finals ===
==== Singles (1–0) ====
Outcome	No.	Date	Tournament	Surface	Opponent	Score
Winner	1.	11 May 2008	Bucharest, Romania	Clay	(Russia) Sergei Krotiouk	5–7, 6–1, 6–4

==== Doubles (8–12) ====
Outcome	#	Date	Tournament	Surface	Partner	Opponents	Score
Runner–up	1.	4 November 2001	Sardinia, Italy	Hard	(Russia) Igor Kunitsyn	(Italy) Stefano Mocci (Croatia) Ivan Stelko	3–6, 4–6
Runner–up	2.	25 November 2001	Sardinia, Italy	Hard	(Russia) Igor Kunitsyn	(Brazil) Josh Goffi (Canada) Chris James	3–6, 6–7^{(4)}
Runner–up	3.	4 May 2002	Mumbai, India	Hard	(Russia) Ivan Syrov	(India) Mustafa Ghouse (India) Vijay Kannan	3–6, 6–7^{(3)}
Runner–up	4.	30 June 2002	Sardinia, Italy	Clay	(Italy) Stefano Tarallo	(Italy) Florian Allgauer (Argentina) Federico Cardinali	7–5, 2–6, 4–6
Runner–up	5.	25 August 2002	Saransk, Russia	Clay	(Russia) Ivan Syrov	(Russia) Teymuraz Gabashvili (Russia) Alexander Pavlioutchenkov	4–6, 6–7^{(3)}
Runner–up	6.	15 December 2002	Ourense, Spain	Hard	(Russia) Ivan Syrov	(United Kingdom) Oliver Freelove (Andorra) Joan Jiménez Guerra	4–6, 2–6
Runner–up	7.	13 April 2003	Frascati, Italy	Clay	(Russia) Ivan Syrov	(Hungary) Gergely Kisgyörgy (Italy) Giancarlo Petrazzuolo	4–6, 2–1 ret.
Winners	1.	29 August 2004	Krasnoarmeisk, Russia	Hard	(Russia) Alexander Pavlioutchenkov	(Russia) Philipp Mukhometov (Russia) Evgueni Smirnov	6–2, 6–4
Winners	2.	17 April 2005	Qarshi, Uzbekistan	Hard	(Russia) Igor Kunitsyn	(Uzbekistan) Murad Inoyatov (Uzbekistan) Denis Istomin	6–4, 5–7, 6–4
Runner–up	8.	7 May 2005	Namangan, Uzbekistan	Hard	(Russia) Andrei Stoliarov	(South Africa) Raven Klaasen (Russia) Konstantin Kravchuk	2–6, 7–6^{(5)}, 6–7^{(4)}
Winners	3.	11 September 2005	Minsk, Belarus	Clay	(Russia) Alexandre Krasnoroutskiy	(Russia) Konstantin Kravchuk (Russia) Denis Matsukevich	7–6^{(8)}, 7–6^{(5)}
Winners	4.	18 September 2005	Minsk, Belarus	Hard	(Russia) Alexandre Krasnoroutskiy	(Russia) Konstantin Kravchuk (Russia) Denis Matsukevich	6–2, 4–6, 6–1
Runner–up	9.	16 July 2006	Carpi, Italy	Clay	(Italy) Luca Vanni	(Italy) Mattia Livraghi (Italy) Matteo Volante	6–1, 6–7^{(8)}, 4–6
Winners	5.	23 July 2006	Carpi, Italy	Clay	(Italy) Luca Vanni	(Chile) Hermes Gamonal (Chile) Guillermo Hormazábal	6–2, 6–3
Winners	6.	17 February 2008	La Habana, Cuba	Hard	(Belarus) Pavel Katliarov	(Venezuela) Luis Javier Cuellar Contreras (Cuba) Roberto Maytín	6–7^{(2)}, 6–4, [10–5]
Runner–up	10.	24 February 2008	La Habana, Cuba	Hard	(Belarus) Pavel Katliarov	(Venezuela) Piero Luisi (Cuba) Roberto Maytín	1–6, 6–4, [10–8]
Winners	7.	12 April 2008	Moscow, Russia	Carpet (i)	(Russia) Konstantin Kravchuk	(United Kingdom) Chris Eaton (United Kingdom) Alexander Slabinsky	6–1, 6–2
Winners	8.	23 May 2008	Bucharest, Romania	Clay	(Belarus) Pavel Katliarov	(Romania) Victor-Mugurel Anagnastopol (France) Thomas Cazes Carrere	2–6, 7–5, [10–8]
Runner–up	11.	21 June 2008	Minsk, Belarus	Hard	(Belarus) Pavel Katliarov	(Canada) Pierre-Ludovic Duclos (Russia) Dmitri Sitak	5–7, 4–6
Runner–up	12.	21 September 2008	Sochi, Russia	Clay	(Russia) Valery Rudnev	(Russia) Mikhail Fufygin (Russia) Vitali Reshetnikov	2–6, 1–6
