= Mikal Statham =

New Zealand tennis player

- Full name: Mikal Statham
- ITF name: Mikal (Oliver) Statham
- Country (sports): New Zealand
- Residence: Auckland, New Zealand
- Born: 25 April 1987 (age 38) London, United Kingdom
- Plays: Right-handed
- Prize money: $34,082

Singles
- Career record: 1–1 (at ATP Tour level, Grand Slam level, and in Davis Cup)
- Career titles: 0
- Highest ranking: No. 711 (12 April 2010)
- Current ranking: No. 1423T (28 December 2020)

Doubles
- Career record: 0–5 (at ATP Tour level, Grand Slam level, and in Davis Cup)
- Career titles: 3 ITF
- Highest ranking: No. 381 (28 September 2009)
- Current ranking: No. 1323T (28 December 2020)
- Last updated on: 3 January 2021.

Mikal Statham (born 25 April 1987), usually referred to by his self-penned nickname of "Oliver," is a tennis player from New Zealand.

Statham has a career high ATP singles ranking of 711 achieved on 12 April 2010. He also has a career high ATP doubles ranking of 381 achieved on 28 September 2009. He has represented New Zealand at the Davis Cup.

== Career ==
Statham made his ATP doubles main draw debut at the 2007 Heineken Open, partnering his twin brother Rubin.

Having not competed since 2011, he played two tournaments in Thailand in 2016, and then returned again to professional tournaments in 2018, when he played three ITF events.

=== 2019 ===
Statham played exclusively in Cancún in 2019, competing in 16 tournaments from March to August. His best efforts in singles were three second round losses, but he twice reached the semi-finals in doubles.

=== 2020 ===
Statham only played domestic competitions in 2020, including helping his Hikurangi team win the inaugural New Zealand Premier League.

== Davis Cup ==
Group membership
World Group (0)
Group I (0)
Group II (1–2)
Group III (0)
Group IV (0)

- ▲ ▼ indicates the outcome of the Davis Cup match followed by the score, date, place of event, the zonal classification and its phase, and the court surface.

Rubber outcome	No.	Rubber	Match type (partner if any)	Opponent nation	Opponent player(s)	Score
▲5–0; 10–12 July 2009; Perry Arena Indoor Stadium, Hamilton, New Zealand; Group II Asia/Oceania Semi-final; Hard (i) surface
Victory	1.	V	Singles (dead rubber)	Indonesia	Sunu-Wahyu Trijati	6–1, 6–0
▼1–4; 18–20 September 2009; Philippine Columbian Association, Manila, Philippines; Group II Asia/Oceania Final; Clay (i) surface
Defeat	1.	III	Doubles (with G.D. Jones)	Philippines	Treat Huey / Cecil Mamiit	6–7^{(4–7)}, 3–6, 5–7
Defeat	2.	IV	Singles (dead rubber)	Philippines	Johnny Arcilla	3–6, 6–2, 4–6

== ATP Challenger and ITF Future finals ==
=== Singles: 1 (1 runner-up) ===
Legend
ATP Challengers (0–0)
ITF Futures (0–1)

Result	W–L	Date	Tournament	Tier	Surface	Opponent	Score
Loss	0–1	Aug 2009	Ramat HaSharon (1), Israel F4	Futures	Hard	(Israel) Noam Okun	2–6, 1–6

=== Doubles: 13 (3 titles, 10 runners-up) ===
Legend
ATP Challengers (0–0)
ITF Futures (3–10)

Result	W–L	Date	Tournament	Tier	Surface	Partner	Opponents	Score
Loss	0–1	Jul 2006	Modena, Italy F24	Futures	Clay	(New Zealand) Rubin Statham	(Italy) Matteo Fago (Italy) Stefano Pescosolido	7–6^{(7–5)}, 1–6, 4–6
Loss	0–2	Sep 2006	Hope Island, Australia F8	Futures	Hard	(New Zealand) Rubin Statham	(Australia) Alun Jones (Australia) Robert Smeets	2–6, 1–6
Win	1–2	Mar 2008	Hamilton, New Zealand F2	Futures	Hard	(Australia) Nathan Healey	(Australia) Andrew Coelho (Australia) Brydan Klein	7–5, 3–6, [10–8]
Loss	1–3	Sep 2008	Khon Kaen, Thailand F4	Futures	Hard	(Chinese Taipei) Chen Ti	(China) Gao Wan (China) Yu Xin-yuan	5–7, 7–6^{(10–8)}, [7–10]
Loss	1–4	Sep 2008	Gympie, Australia F7	Futures	Hard	(Barbados) Haydn Lewis	(Australia) Adam Hubble (Australia) Greg Jones	6–7^{(6–8)}, 7–6^{(7–4)}, [5–10]
Loss	1–5	Oct 2008	Traralgon, Australia F8	Futures	Hard	(Australia) Jared Easton	(Australia) Dane Propoggia (Australia) Matt Reid	3–6, 4–6
Win	2–5	Nov 2008	Petaling Jaya, Malaysia F2	Futures	Hard	(China) Yu Xin-yuan	(Australia) Steven Goh (Australia) Joel Lindner	6–1, 6–7^{(5–7)}, [10–4]
Loss	2–6	Nov 2008	Perth, Australia F11	Futures	Hard	(Australia) Adam Feeney	(Australia) Kaden Hensel (Australia) Adam Hubble	4–6, 7–6^{(7–2)}, [10–12]
Win	3–6	Jun 2009	Ain Sokhna, Egypt F8	Futures	Clay	(United States) Adam El Mihdawy	(Egypt) Karim Maamoun (Egypt) Sherif Sabry	6–1, 7–5
Loss	3–7	Jun 2009	Giza, Egypt F10	Futures	Clay	(United States) Adam El Mihdawy	(Egypt) Karim Maamoun (Egypt) Sherif Sabry	4–6, 3–6
Loss	3–8	Mar 2010	Tokyo, Japan F2	Futures	Hard	(United States) Maciek Sykut	(Japan) Tasuku Iwami (Japan) Hiroki Kondo	6–3, 1–6, [8–10]
Loss	3–9	Mar 2010	Kōfu, Japan F3	Futures	Hard	(United States) Maciek Sykut	(Japan) Tasuku Iwami (Japan) Hiroki Kondo	2–6, 3–6
Loss	3–10	Oct 2010	Port Pirie, Australia F8	Futures	Hard	(Canada) Erik Chvojka	(Australia) Jared Easton (Australia) Joel Lindner	4–6, 2–6
