= G.D. Jones =

New Zealand tennis player

- Country (sports): New Zealand
- Born: 1 April 1986 (age 38); Auckland, New Zealand
- Height: 1.83 m (6 ft 0 in)
- Plays: Right-handed (two-handed backhand)
- Prize money: $34,371

Singles
- Career record: 7–3 (at ATP Tour level, Grand Slam level, and in Davis Cup)
- Career titles: 0 ITF
- Highest ranking: No. 604 (24 November 2008)

Doubles
- Career record: 3–4 (at ATP Tour level, Grand Slam level, and in Davis Cup)
- Career titles: 1 Challenger, 11 ITF
- Highest ranking: No. 206 (16 November 2009)
- Last updated on: 23 October 2017.

G.D. Jones (born 1 April 1986) is a retired tennis player from New Zealand.

Jones has a career high ATP singles ranking of 604 achieved on 24 November 2008. He also has a career high ATP doubles ranking of 206 achieved on 16 November 2009.

Jones represented New Zealand at the Davis Cup, where he had a record of 10–3.

== Career titles ==
=== Doubles: 12 (1 Challenger, 11 ITF) ===
Legend
ATP Challenger Tour (1)
ITF Futures (11)

Date	Tournament	Tier	Surface	Partner	Opponents	Score
March 2008	Japan F2, Tokyo	Futures	Hard	(New Zealand) Daniel King-Turner	(Chinese Taipei) Lin Tzu-yang (Chinese Taipei) Yi Chu-huan	6–3, 6–2
May 2008	Mexico F5, Guadalajara	Futures	Clay	(United States) Nima Roshan	(Mexico) Miguel Gallardo Valles (Mexico) Santiago González	6–3, 4–6, [10–7]
May 2008	Mexico F7, Morelia	Futures	Hard	(United States) Nima Roshan	(France) Philippe de Bonnevie (Australia) Dane Fernandez	6–3, 6–2
June 2008	USA F12, Loomis	Futures	Hard	(New Zealand) Daniel King-Turner	(Dominican Republic) Víctor Estrella Burgos (Brazil) Ricardo Hocevar	6–2, 6–3
June 2008	USA F13, Sacramento	Futures	Hard	(New Zealand) Daniel King-Turner	(United States) Scott Oudsema (United States) Greg Ouellette	6–2, 4–6, [10–5]
November 2008	Knoxville Challenger	Challenger	Hard (i)	(South Africa) Kevin Anderson	(United States) Rajeev Ram (United States) Bobby Reynolds	3–6, 6–0, [10–7]
March 2009	New Zealand F1, North Shore City/Auckland	Futures	Hard	(New Zealand) Daniel King-Turner	(China) Gong Maoxin (China) Yu Xinyuan	6–3, 6–4
March 2009	New Zealand F3, Wellington	Futures	Hard	(New Zealand) Daniel King-Turner	(New Zealand) Marcus Daniell (Australia) Joel Lindner	6–2, 6–4
April 2009	Korea Republic F1, Daegu	Futures	Hard	(New Zealand) Daniel King-Turner	(South Korea) Kim Young-jun (China) Li Zhe	6–2, 6–4
May 2009	Korea Republic F4, Gimcheon	Futures	Hard	(New Zealand) Daniel King-Turner	(China) Li Zhe (China) Wang Yu Jr.	6–4, 6–1
August 2009	Israel F4, Ramat HaSharon	Futures	Hard	(United States) John Paul Fruttero	(France) Ludovic Walter (Israel) Amir Weintraub	6–2, 4–6, [10–5]
September 2009	Israel F5, Ramat HaSharon	Futures	Hard	(United States) John Paul Fruttero	(New Zealand) Marcus Daniell (Slovakia) Miloslav Mečíř	3–6, 6–2, [10–4]

== National participation ==
=== Davis Cup (10 wins, 3 losses) ===
Group membership World Group (0–0) WG play-off (0–0) Group I (0–0) Group II (10–3)	Matches by surface Hard (10–2) Clay (0–1) Grass (0–0) Carpet (0–0)	Matches by type Singles (7–1) Doubles (3–2)	Matches by setting Indoors (7–3) Outdoors (3–0)	Matches by venue New Zealand (7–2) Away (3–1)

- ▲ ▼ indicates the result of the Davis Cup match followed by the score, date, place of event, the zonal classification and its phase, and the court surface.

Result	No.	Rubber	Match type (partner if any)	Opponent nation	Opponent player(s)	Score
▲4–1; 4–6 March 2005; Auckland, New Zealand; Group II Asia/Oceania Zone first round; hard(i) surface
Victory	1	II	Singles	Kazakhstan	Alexey Kedryuk	6–3, 6–4, 6–4
Victory	2	V	Singles (dead rubber)	Kazakhstan	Stanislas Bykov	6–1, 6–0
▲3–2; 15–17 July 2005; Auckland, New Zealand; Group II Asia/Oceania Zone second round; hard(i) surface
Victory	3	II	Singles	Kuwait	Mohammad Ghareeb	3–6, 6–4, 7–5, 6–2
▲5–0; 8–10 February 2008; Muscat, Oman; Group II Asia/Oceania Zone first round; hard surface
Victory	4	I	Singles	Oman	Khalid Al Nabhani	6–3, 6–2, 6–0
Victory	5	V	Singles (dead rubber)	Oman	Mohammed Al Nabhani	6–1, 7–5
▲5–0; 11–13 April 2008; Mishref, Kuwait; Group II Asia/Oceania Zone second round; hard surface
Victory	6	III	Doubles (with Daniel King-Turner)	Kuwait	Mohammad Ghareeb / Mohammad-Khaliq Siddiq	6–2, 6–4, 6–4
▼2–3; 19–21 September 2008; New Plymouth, New Zealand; Group II Asia/Oceania Zone third round; hard(i) surface
Defeat	7	III	Doubles (with Daniel King-Turner)	China	Yu Xinyuan / Zeng Shaoxuan	2–6, 4–6, 7–5, 4–6
Defeat	8	V	Singles	China	Sun Peng	3–6, 7–6, 5–7, 6–4, 3–6
▲5–0; 6–8 March 2009; North Shore, New Zealand; Group II Asia/Oceania Zone first round; hard(i) surface
Victory	9	III	Doubles (with Daniel King-Turner)	Malaysia	Adam Jaya / Si Yew Ming	6–1, 6–4, 6–2
Victory	10	V	Singles (dead rubber)	Malaysia	Adam Jaya	6–3, 6–3
▲5–0; 10–12 July 2009; Hamilton, New Zealand; Group II Asia/Oceania Zone second round; hard(i) surface
Victory	11	II	Singles	Indonesia	Christopher Rungkat	7–5, 4–6, 6–3, 6–2
Victory	12	III	Doubles (with Daniel King-Turner)	Indonesia	Arta Ketut-Nesa / Christopher Rungkat	4–6, 7–5, 7–6^{(7–4)}, 6–4
▼1–4; 18–20 September 2009; Manila, Philippines; Group II Asia/Oceania Zone third round; clay(i) surface
Defeat	13	III	Doubles (with Mikal Statham)	Philippines	Treat Huey / Cecil Mamiit	6–7^{(4–7)}, 3–6, 5–7
