= Daniel King-Turner =

New Zealand tennis player

- Country (sports): New Zealand
- Born: 15 May 1984 (age 40)
- Turned pro: 2003
- Retired: 2013
- Plays: Right-handed
- Prize money: $175,333

Singles
- Career record: 14–14
- Career titles: 0
- Highest ranking: No. 217 (19 July 2010)

Doubles
- Career record: 12–116
- Career titles: 0
- Highest ranking: 182 (8 September 2008)
- Last updated on: 15 May 2014.

Daniel King-Turner (born 15 May 1984) is a former professional tennis player from New Zealand. In total, he won eight Futures singles titles as well as two Challenger doubles titles and 10 Futures doubles titles. He also made the semi-finals of two Challenger events, Pozoblanco in 2010 and Binghamton in 2012.

He was a member of the New Zealand Davis Cup team between 2005 and 2013, competing in 19 ties, and winning 24 of 41 rubbers.

He attended Nelson College from 1996 to 1999.

He currently coaches at Scarbro Tennis Park with Te Kani Williams.

== ATP/ITF Tour Finals ==
=== Singles (8–0) ===
Legend
ATP Challenger Tour (0–0)
ITF Futures (8–0)

Outcome	No.	Date	Tournament	Surface	Opponent in the final	Score
Winner	1.	22 July 2006	F10 Frinton-on-Sea	Grass	(United Kingdom) Tom Rushby	3–6, 6–4, 6–4
Winner	2.	24 June 2007	F7 Karuizawa	Clay	(Japan) Takahiro Terachi	0–6, 6–4, 7–6^{(7–3)}
Winner	3.	12 September 2007	F13 Mulhouse	Hard (i)	(United States) Scott Oudsema	7–6^{(7–5)}, 6–3
Winner	4.	29 March 2009	F3 Wellington	Hard	(South Korea) Young-Jun Kim	6–4, 6–1
Winner	5.	10 October 2009	F11 Pune	Hard	(Germany) Alexander Satschko	6–7^{(3–7)}, 6–4, 6–2
Winner	6.	24 October 2009	F6 Nonthaburi	Hard	(United States) Nathan Thompson	6–3, 7–6^{(7–5)}
Winner	7.	21 February 2010	F1 Mildura	Grass	(Australia) Colin Ebelthite	6–3, 6–7^{(4–7)}, 6–4
Winner	8.	15 July 2012	F4 Saskatoon	Hard	(Australia) Matt Reid	6–3, 6–3

=== Doubles (12–1) ===
Legend
ATP Challenger Tour (2–1)
ITF Futures (10–0)

Outcome	No.	Date	Tournament	Surface	Partner	Opponents in the final	Score
Winner	1.	9 December 2006	F6 Ramat HaSharon	Hard	(Russia) Michail Elgin	(Austria) M Raditschnigg (Switzerland) S Swinnen	3–6, 6–3, 6–2
Winner	2.	11 March 2007	F2 Hamilton	Hard	(United States) James Cerretani	(Australia) Carsten Ball (Australia) D Fernandez	6–7^{(11–13)}, 7–6^{(7–5)}, 6–2
Winner	3.	29 September 2007	F18 Nottingham 2	Hard	(Australia) Rameez Junaid	(United Kingdom) D Brewer (United Kingdom) I Flanagan	W/O
Winner	4.	28 October 2007	Rimouski	Carpet (i)	(Australia) Robert Smeets	(United States) Brendan Evans (United States) Alberto Francis	7–5, 6–7^{(7–9)}, [10–7]
Winner	5.	2 December 2007	Brisbane	Hard	(Australia) Rameez Junaid	(Australia) Carsten Ball (Australia) Adam Feeney	3–6, 7–6^{(7–3)}, [10–8]
Winner	6.	30 March 2008	F2 Nishitōkyō	Hard	(New Zealand) G. D. Jones	(Chinese Taipei) T. Lin (Chinese Taipei) C. Yi	6–3, 6–2
Winner	7.	15 June 2008	F12 Loomis	Hard	(New Zealand) G. D. Jones	(Dominican Republic) Víctor Estrella Burgos (Brazil) Ricardo Hocevar	6–2, 6–3
Winner	8.	22 June 2008	13 Sacramento	Hard	(New Zealand) G. D. Jones	(United States) Scott Oudsema (United States) Greg Ouellette	6–2, 4–6, [10–5]
Winner	9.	15 March 2009	F1 North Shore City	Hard	(New Zealand) G. D. Jones	(China) M. Gong (China) X. Yu	6–3, 6–4
Winner	10.	29 March 2009	F3 Wellington	Hard	(New Zealand) G. D. Jones	(New Zealand) Marcus Daniell (Australia) J. Lindner	6–2, 6–4
Winner	11.	12 April 2009	F1 Daegu	Hard	(New Zealand) G. D. Jones	(South Korea) Y. Kim (China) Z. Li	6–2, 6–4
Winner	12.	3 May 2009	F4 Gimcheon	Hard	(New Zealand) G. D. Jones	(China) Y. Wang (China)	6–4, 6–1
Runner–up	1.	29 April 2012	Kaohsiung	Hard	(Denmark) Frederik Nielsen	(United States) John Paul Fruttero (South Africa) Raven Klaasen	7–6^{(8–6)}, 5–7, [8–10]
