= 1991 Davis Cup Asia/Oceania Zone =

International tennis competition

The Asia/Oceania Zone was one of the three zones of the regional Davis Cup competition in 1991.

In the Asia/Oceania Zone there were two different tiers, called groups, in which teams competed against each other to advance to the upper tier.

== Group I ==
Winners in Group I advanced to the World Group qualifying round, along with losing teams from the World Group first round. The winner of the preliminary round joined the remaining teams in the main draw first round, while the losing team was relegated to the Asia/Oceania Zone Group II in 1992.

=== Participating nations ===
- China
- India
- Indonesia
- Japan
- Philippines
- South Korea
- Thailand

==== Draw ====
Preliminary round 8–10 February
Bangkok, Thailand (hard)
India | 5
Thailand | 0

- Thailand relegated to Group II in 1992.

First round 29–31 March
South Korea
bye
Jaipur, India (grass)
India | 4
Indonesia | 1
Kagoshima, Japan (indoor carpet)
Philippines | 4
Japan | 1
bye
China

Second round 3–5 May
New Delhi, India (grass)
South Korea | 2
India | 3
Manila, Philippines (indoor hard)
Philippines | 4
China | 1

- India and Philippines advance to World Group qualifying round.

=== Preliminary round ===
==== Thailand vs. India ====
Thailand
0
National Tennis Centre, Bangkok, Thailand
8–10 February 1991
Hard

India
5

| | | | 1 | 2 | 3 | 4 | 5 |
|---|---|---|---|---|---|---|---|
| 1 | (Thailand) (India) | Woraphol Thongkhamchu; Leander Paes | 3; 6 | 1; 6 | 4; 6 |
| 2 | (Thailand) (India) | Narathorn Srichaphan; Srinivasan Vasudevan | 3; 6 | 7^{7} 6^{5} | 6; 4 | 2; 6 | 3; 6 |
| 3 | (Thailand) (India) | Vittaya Samrej / Narathorn Srichaphan; Zeeshan Ali / Leander Paes | 6; 1 | 6^{4} 7^{7} | 2; 6 | 4; 6 |
| 4 | (Thailand) (India) | Woraphol Thongkhamchu; Srinivasan Vasudevan | 3; 6 | 2; 6 |
| 5 | (Thailand) (India) | Narathorn Srichaphan; Leander Paes | 4; 6 | 4; 6 |

=== First round ===
==== India vs. Indonesia ====
India
4
Jai Club Tennis Complex, Jaipur, India
29–31 March 1991
Grass

Indonesia
1

| | | | 1 | 2 | 3 | 4 | 5 |
|---|---|---|---|---|---|---|---|
| 1 | (India) (Indonesia) | Ramesh Krishnan; Bonit Wiryawan | 6; 2 | 6; 2 | 6; 4 |
| 2 | (India) (Indonesia) | Leander Paes; Daniel Heryanto | 6; 4 | 6; 3 | 6; 2 |
| 3 | (India) (Indonesia) | Ramesh Krishnan / Leander Paes; Daniel Heryanto / Bonit Wiryawan | 6; 2 | 6; 3 | 6; 3 |
| 4 | (India) (Indonesia) | Zeeshan Ali; Daniel Heryanto | 2; 6 | 6; 2 | 10; 12 |
| 5 | (India) (Indonesia) | Leander Paes; Benny Wijaya | 6; 2 | 6; 4 |

==== Japan vs. Philippines ====
Japan
1
Urban Wellness Club, Kagoshima, Japan
29–31 March 1991
Carpet (indoors)

Philippines
4

| | | | 1 | 2 | 3 | 4 | 5 |
|---|---|---|---|---|---|---|---|
| 1 | (Japan) (Philippines) | Shuzo Matsuoka; Roland So | 5; 7 | 2; 6 | 2; 6 |
| 2 | (Japan) (Philippines) | Eduardo Furusho; Felix Barrientos | 3; 6 | 4; 6 | 4; 6 |
| 3 | (Japan) (Philippines) | Shuzo Matsuoka / Tetsuya Sato; Felix Barrientos / Roland So | 7^{11} 6^{9} | 7^{9} 6^{7} | 6; 3 |
| 4 | (Japan) (Philippines) | Shuzo Matsuoka; Felix Barrientos | 3; 6 | 6; 4 | 6^{2} 7^{7} | 5; 7 |
| 5 | (Japan) (Philippines) | Tetsuya Sato; Roland So | 2; 6 | 1; 6 |

=== Second round ===
==== India vs. South Korea ====
India
3
Delhi Lawn Tennis Association Complex, New Delhi, India
3–5 May 1991
Grass

South Korea
2

| | | | 1 | 2 | 3 | 4 | 5 |
|---|---|---|---|---|---|---|---|
| 1 | (India) (South Korea) | Ramesh Krishnan; Ji Seung-ho | 4; 6 | 6; 2 | 6; 0 | 6; 3 |
| 2 | (India) (South Korea) | Leander Paes; Chang Eui-jong | 4; 6 | 7; 5 | 4; 6 | 6^{4} 7^{7} |
| 3 | (India) (South Korea) | Ramesh Krishnan / Leander Paes; Chang Eui-jong / Ji Seung-ho | 7^{7} 6^{5} | 6; 4 | 7; 5 |
| 4 | (India) (South Korea) | Ramesh Krishnan; Chang Eui-jong | 6; 4 | 4; 6 | 6; 1 | 3; 6 | 4; 6 |
| 5 | (India) (South Korea) | Leander Paes; Ji Seung-ho | 7^{7} 6^{5} | 6; 3 | 6; 2 |

==== Philippines vs. China ====
Philippines
4
Rizal Memorial Tennis Centre, Manila, Philippines
3–5 May 1991
Hard (indoors)

China
1

| | | | 1 | 2 | 3 | 4 | 5 |
|---|---|---|---|---|---|---|---|
| 1 | (Philippines) (China) | Roland So; Xia Jiaping | 7; 5 | 7^{7} 6^{3} | 2; 6 | 2; 6 | 3; 6 |
| 2 | (Philippines) (China) | Felix Barrientos; Pan Bing | 6; 3 | 6; 3 | 6; 2 |
| 3 | (Philippines) (China) | Felix Barrientos / Sofronio Palahang; Meng Qianghua / Xia Jiaping | 7; 5 | 7^{7} 6^{2} | 7; 5 |
| 4 | (Philippines) (China) | Felix Barrientos; Xia Jiaping | 6; 3 | 6; 2 | 6; 1 |
| 5 | (Philippines) (China) | Roland So; Pan Bing | 6; 1 | 6; 2 |

== Group II ==
The winner in Group II advanced to the Asia/Oceania Zone Group I in 1992.

=== Participating nations ===
- Bahrain
- Bangladesh
- Chinese Taipei
- Hong Kong
- Iraq
- Jordan
- Kuwait
- Malaysia
- Pakistan
- Saudi Arabia
- Singapore
- Sri Lanka
- Syria

==== Draw ====
First round 3–12 May
Pakistan
bye
Iraq
Jordan | w/o
Chinese Taipei
bye
Kuala Lumpur, Malaysia (indoor hard)
Saudi Arabia | 1
Malaysia | 4
Manama, Bahrain (hard)
Bangladesh | 3
Bahrain | 2
Colombo, Sri Lanka (clay)
Syria | 0
Sri Lanka | 5
Singapore (hard)
Singapore | 5
Kuwait | 0
bye
Hong Kong

Second round 13–16 June
Amman, Jordan (hard)
Pakistan | 5
Jordan | 0
Kuala Lumpur, Malaysia (indoor hard)
Chinese Taipei | 3
Malaysia | 2
Dhaka, Bangladesh (hard)
Bangladesh | 0
Sri Lanka | 5
Singapore (hard)
Singapore | 0
Hong Kong | 5

Third round 19–21 July
Taipei, Taiwan (hard)
Pakistan | 0
Chinese Taipei | 5
Causeway Bay, Hong Kong (hard)
Sri Lanka | 2
Hong Kong | 3

Third round 20–22 September
Taipei, Taiwan (indoor hard)
Chinese Taipei | 3
Hong Kong | 2

- Chinese Taipei promoted to Group I in 1992.

=== First round ===
==== Malaysia vs. Saudi Arabia ====
Malaysia
4
National Tennis Centre, Kuala Lumpur, Malaysia
10–12 May 1991
Hard (indoors)

Saudi Arabia
1

| | | | 1 | 2 | 3 | 4 | 5 |
|---|---|---|---|---|---|---|---|---|
| 1 | (Malaysia) (Saudi Arabia) | Selvam Veerasingam; Khalid-Hussain Fitiani | 6; 0 | 6; 2 | 6; 3 |
| 2 | (Malaysia) (Saudi Arabia) | Ramayah Ramachandran; Bader Mohammed Almuqail | 6; 4 | 7^{9} 6^{7} | 5; 7 | 2; 3 | | retired |
| 3 | (Malaysia) (Saudi Arabia) | Selvam Veerasingam / Youssef Wan Rahman; Tawfik Al Ibrahim / Bader Mohammed Almuqail | 6; 1 | 6; 2 | 6; 1 |
| 4 | (Malaysia) (Saudi Arabia) | Selvam Veerasingam; Bader Mohammed Almuqail | 6; 4 | 6; 3 | 6; 1 |
| 5 | (Malaysia) (Saudi Arabia) | Ramayah Ramachandran; Tawfik Al Ibrahim | 6; 3 | 6; 3 |

==== Bahrain vs. Bangladesh ====
Bahrain
2
Isa Town Tennis Stadium, Manama, Bahrain
3–5 May 1991
Hard

Bangladesh
3

| | | | 1 | 2 | 3 | 4 | 5 |
|---|---|---|---|---|---|---|---|
| 1 | (Bahrain) (Bangladesh) | Esam Abdulaal; Ifthekar Sardar | 6; 2 | 6; 3 | 6; 2 |
| 2 | (Bahrain) (Bangladesh) | Shehab Shehab; Shovon Jamaly | 1; 6 | 1; 6 | 4; 6 |
| 3 | (Bahrain) (Bangladesh) | Esam Abdulaal / Shehab Shehab; Ifthekar Sardar / Shovon Jamaly | 2; 6 | 2; 6 | 3; 6 |
| 4 | (Bahrain) (Bangladesh) | Esam Abdulaal; Shovon Jamaly | 2; 6 | 6; 3 | 7^{7} 6^{5} | 1; 6 | 15; 13 |
| 5 | (Bahrain) (Bangladesh) | Shehab Shehab; Ifthekar Sardar | 3; 6 | 6; 3 | 1; 6 | 5; 7 |

==== Sri Lanka vs. Syria ====
Sri Lanka
5
Sri Lanka Tennis Association, Colombo, Sri Lanka
3–5 May 1991
Clay

Syria
0

| | | | 1 | 2 | 3 | 4 | 5 |
|---|---|---|---|---|---|---|---|
| 1 | (Sri Lanka) (Syria) | Umesha Wallooppillai; Samer Mourad | 6; 1 | 6; 0 | 6; 0 |
| 2 | (Sri Lanka) (Syria) | Arjun Fernando; Jehad Sheet | 6; 1 | 6; 0 | 6; 1 |
| 3 | (Sri Lanka) (Syria) | Arjun Fernando / Jayendra Wijeyesekera; Annis Hafeez / Samer Mourad | 6; 1 | 6; 1 | 6; 1 |
| 4 | (Sri Lanka) (Syria) | Arjun Fernando; Samer Mourad | 6; 0 | 6; 0 |
| 5 | (Sri Lanka) (Syria) | Umesha Wallooppillai; Jehad Sheet | 6; 0 | 6; 0 |

==== Singapore vs. Kuwait ====
Singapore
5
Singapore Island Country Club, Singapore
3–5 May 1991
Hard

Kuwait
0

| | | | 1 | 2 | 3 | 4 | 5 |
|---|---|---|---|---|---|---|---|
| 1 | (Singapore) (Kuwait) | Kho Tung-yi; Aymen-Ibrahim Al-Ashwak | 6; 2 | 6; 3 | 6^{3} 7^{7} | 6; 2 |
| 2 | (Singapore) (Kuwait) | Liu Wai-yaw; Khaled Al Foudari | 7; 5 | 6; 4 | 6; 3 |
| 3 | (Singapore) (Kuwait) | Ho Kuen-yiep / Liu Wai-yaw; Aymen-Ibrahim Al-Ashwak / Khaled Al Foudari | 6^{2} 7^{7} | 4; 6 | 7^{7} 6^{4} | 7; 5 | 6; 0 |
| 4 | (Singapore) (Kuwait) | Liu Wai-yaw; Aymen-Ibrahim Al-Ashwak | 6; 2 | 6; 4 |
| 5 | (Singapore) (Kuwait) | Kho Tung-yi; Khaled Al Foudari | 1; 6 | 6; 3 | 6; 2 |

=== Second round ===
==== Jordan vs. Pakistan ====
Jordan
0
King Hussein Sports Palace, Amman, Jordan
13–14 June 1991
Hard

Pakistan
5

| | | | 1 | 2 | 3 | 4 | 5 |
|---|---|---|---|---|---|---|---|
| 1 | (Jordan) (Pakistan) | Hani Al Ali; Hamed-ul-Haq | 4; 6 | 2; 6 | 6; 3 | 2; 6 |
| 2 | (Jordan) (Pakistan) | Emad Abou Hamdeh; Rashid Malik | 2; 6 | 2; 6 | 4; 6 |
| 3 | (Jordan) (Pakistan) | Emad Abou Hamdeh / Aymen Abou Jaber; Rashid Malik / Hamed-ul-Haq | 0; 6 | 1; 6 | 4; 6 |
| 4 | (Jordan) (Pakistan) | Saleh Bushnaq; Omer Rashid | 3; 6 | 2; 6 |
| 5 | (Jordan) (Pakistan) | Emad Abou Hamdeh; Hamed-ul-Haq | 6^{2} 7^{7} | 0; 6 |

==== Malaysia vs. Chinese Taipei ====
Malaysia
2
National Tennis Centre, Kuala Lumpur, Malaysia
14–16 June 1991
Hard (indoors)

Chinese Taipei
3

| | | | 1 | 2 | 3 | 4 | 5 |
|---|---|---|---|---|---|---|---|
| 1 | (Malaysia) (Chinese Taipei) | Selvam Veerasingam; Lien Yu-hui | 7; 5 | 3; 6 | 4; 6 | 4; 6 |
| 2 | (Malaysia) (Chinese Taipei) | Adam Malik; Liu Chung-hsing | 6; 3 | 6; 4 | 6; 2 |
| 3 | (Malaysia) (Chinese Taipei) | Adam Malik / Selvam Veerasingam; Lien Yu-hui / Liu Chung-hsing | 5; 7 | 6; 4 | 7^{7} 6^{5} | 6^{1} 7^{7} | 3; 6 |
| 4 | (Malaysia) (Chinese Taipei) | Adam Malik; Lien Yu-hui | 6; 3 | 6; 4 | 7^{7} 6^{4} |
| 5 | (Malaysia) (Chinese Taipei) | Selvam Veerasingam; Liu Chung-hsing | 6^{4} 7^{7} | 7^{7} 6^{5} | 6^{6} 7^{8} | 3; 6 |

==== Bangladesh vs. Sri Lanka ====
Bangladesh
0
National Tennis Complex, Dhaka, Bangladesh
14–16 June 1991
Hard

Sri Lanka
5

| | | | 1 | 2 | 3 | 4 | 5 |
|---|---|---|---|---|---|---|---|
| 1 | (Bangladesh) (Sri Lanka) | Ifthekar Sardar; Arjun Fernando | 0; 6 | 1; 6 | 1; 6 |
| 2 | (Bangladesh) (Sri Lanka) | Shovon Jamaly; Rohan de Silva | 4; 6 | 2; 6 | 5; 7 |
| 3 | (Bangladesh) (Sri Lanka) | Ifthekar Sardar / Shovon Jamaly; Rohan de Silva / Arjun Fernando | 4; 6 | 4; 6 | 3; 6 |
| 4 | (Bangladesh) (Sri Lanka) | Shovon Jamaly; Arjun Fernando | 4; 6 | 3; 6 |
| 5 | (Bangladesh) (Sri Lanka) | Ifthekar Sardar; Rohan de Silva | 5; 7 | 7; 5 | 2; 6 |

==== Singapore vs. Hong Kong ====
Singapore
0
Singapore Island Country Club, Singapore
14–16 June 1991
Hard

Hong Kong
5

| | | | 1 | 2 | 3 | 4 | 5 |
|---|---|---|---|---|---|---|---|
| 1 | (Singapore) (Hong Kong) | Liu Wai-yaw; Colin Grant | 0; 6 | 0; 6 | 0; 6 |
| 2 | (Singapore) (Hong Kong) | Ho Kuen-yiep; Mike Walker | 1; 6 | 0; 6 | 1; 6 |
| 3 | (Singapore) (Hong Kong) | Ho Kuen-yiep / Liu Wai-yaw; Mark Bailey / Mike Walker | 1; 6 | 5; 7 | 1; 6 |
| 4 | (Singapore) (Hong Kong) | Kho Tung-yi; Mike Walker | 1; 6 | 0; 6 | 3; 6 |
| 5 | (Singapore) (Hong Kong) | Ho Kuen-yiep; Pang Lui | 2; 6 | 2; 6 | 2; 6 |

=== Third round ===
==== Chinese Taipei vs. Pakistan ====
Chinese Taipei
5
Green Bay Tennis Club, Taipei, Taiwan
19–21 July 1991
Hard

Pakistan
0

| | | | 1 | 2 | 3 | 4 | 5 |
|---|---|---|---|---|---|---|---|
| 1 | (Chinese Taipei) (Pakistan) | Lien Yu-hui; Hamed-ul-Haq | 6; 3 | 6; 3 | 6; 3 |
| 2 | (Chinese Taipei) (Pakistan) | Liu Chung-hsing; Rashid Malik | 7^{7} 6^{3} | 6; 3 | 6; 0 |
| 3 | (Chinese Taipei) (Pakistan) | Lien Yu-hui / Liu Chung-hsing; Rashid Malik / Hamed-ul-Haq | 6; 1 | 6; 4 | 6; 1 |
| 4 | (Chinese Taipei) (Pakistan) | Chen Chih-jung; Omer Rashid | 6; 3 | 6; 4 |
| 5 | (Chinese Taipei) (Pakistan) | Liu Chung-hsing; Hamed-ul-Haq | 6; 2 | 3; 6 | 6; 3 |

==== Hong Kong vs. Sri Lanka ====
Hong Kong
3
Urban Council Tennis Club, Victoria Park, Causeway Bay, Hong Kong
19–21 July 1991
Hard

Sri Lanka
2

| | | | 1 | 2 | 3 | 4 | 5 |
|---|---|---|---|---|---|---|---|
| 1 | (Hong Kong) (Sri Lanka) | Mark Bailey; Arjun Fernando | 7^{9} 6^{7} | 1; 6 | 4; 6 | 6; 3 | 6; 2 |
| 2 | (Hong Kong) (Sri Lanka) | Mike Walker; Umesha Wallooppillai | 5; 7 | 6; 4 | 5; 7 | 2; 6 |
| 3 | (Hong Kong) (Sri Lanka) | Mark Bailey / Mike Walker; Rohan de Silva / Arjun Fernando | 7^{11} 6^{9} | 5; 7 | 5; 7 | 6; 3 | 6; 1 |
| 4 | (Hong Kong) (Sri Lanka) | Mike Walker; Arjun Fernando | 6; 2 | 6; 3 | 6; 0 |
| 5 | (Hong Kong) (Sri Lanka) | Mark Bailey; Umesha Wallooppillai | 1; 6 | 2; 6 |

=== Fourth round ===
==== Chinese Taipei vs. Hong Kong ====
Chinese Taipei
3
Lin Kou Stadium, Taipei, Taiwan
20–22 September 1991
Hard (indoors)

Hong Kong
2

| | | | 1 | 2 | 3 | 4 | 5 |
|---|---|---|---|---|---|---|---|
| 1 | (Chinese Taipei) (Hong Kong) | Lien Yu-hui; Colin Grant | 6; 2 | 6; 2 | 6; 3 |
| 2 | (Chinese Taipei) (Hong Kong) | Chen Chih-jung; Mike Walker | 4; 6 | 3; 6 | 3; 6 |
| 3 | (Chinese Taipei) (Hong Kong) | Lien Yu-hui / Liu Chung-hsing; Mark Bailey / Mike Walker | 7^{8} 6^{6} | 6; 4 | 6; 2 |
| 4 | (Chinese Taipei) (Hong Kong) | Lien Yu-hui; Mike Walker | 6^{6} 7^{8} | 4; 6 | 4; 6 |
| 5 | (Chinese Taipei) (Hong Kong) | Chen Chih-jung; Colin Grant | 7; 5 | 6; 3 | 6; 3 |
