= 1990 Davis Cup Asia/Oceania Zone =

International tennis competition

The Asia/Oceania Zone was one of the three zones of the regional Davis Cup competition in 1990.

In the Asia/Oceania Zone there were two different tiers, called groups, in which teams competed against each other to advance to the upper tier.

== Group I ==
Winners in Group I advanced to the World Group qualifying round, along with losing teams from the World Group first round. The winner of the preliminary round joined the remaining teams in the main draw first round, while the losing team was relegated to the Asia/Oceania Zone Group II in 1991.

=== Participating nations ===
- China
- India
- Indonesia
- Japan
- Pakistan
- Philippines
- South Korea

==== Draw ====
Preliminary Round; 2–4 February
Guangzhou, China (indoor hard)
China	5
Pakistan	0

- Pakistan relegated to Group II in 1991.

First Round; 30 March–1 April
Indonesia
bye
Shanghai, China (clay)
China	5
Philippines	0
Chandigarh, India (grass)
Japan	1
India	4
bye
South Korea

Second Round; 4–6 May
Beijing, China (hard)
Indonesia	1
China	4
Seoul, South Korea (clay)
India	0
South Korea	5

- China and South Korea advance to World Group qualifying round.

=== Preliminary round ===
==== China vs. Pakistan ====
China
5
Er Shatou Stadium, Guangzhou, China
2–4 February 1990
Hard (indoors)

Pakistan
0

			1	2	3	4	5
1	(China) (Pakistan)	Pan Bing; Hamed-ul-Haq	6; 0	6; 2	6; 0
2	(China) (Pakistan)	Zhang Jiuhua; Rashid Malik	6; 1	6; 3	6; 0
3	(China) (Pakistan)	Liu Shuhua / Xia Jiaping; Rashid Malik / Hamed-ul-Haq	6; 2	6; 1	6; 2
4	(China) (Pakistan)	Zhang Jiuhua; Hamed-ul-Haq	6; 4	6; 2
5	(China) (Pakistan)	Pan Bing; Rashid Malik	7; 5	6; 1

=== First round ===
==== China vs. Philippines ====
China
5
Hui Xu Stadium, Shanghai, China
30 March–1 April 1990
Clay

Philippines
0

			1	2	3	4	5
1	(China) (Philippines)	Xia Jiaping; Roland So	4; 6	5; 7	6; 4	6; 3	6; 2
2	(China) (Philippines)	Pan Bing; Danilo Pila	6; 0	6; 0	6; 0
3	(China) (Philippines)	Liu Shuhua / Pan Bing; Felix Barrientos / Roland So	6; 4	6; 4	2; 6	7^{7} 6^{2}
4	(China) (Philippines)	Pan Bing; Roland So	6; 4	6; 3
5	(China) (Philippines)	Xia Jiaping; Danilo Pila	6; 2	6; 4

==== India vs. Japan ====
India
4
Chandigarh Stadium, Chandigarh, India
30 March–1 April 1990
Grass

Japan
1

			1	2	3	4	5
1	(India) (Japan)	Zeeshan Ali; Hidehiko Tanizawa	6; 4	6; 2	6; 3
2	(India) (Japan)	Srinivasan Vasudevan; Shuzo Matsuoka	6; 4	6; 1	7^{8} 6^{6}
3	(India) (Japan)	Zeeshan Ali / Leander Paes; Shuzo Matsuoka / Shigeru Ota	4; 6	6; 3	6; 4	4; 6	18; 16
4	(India) (Japan)	Srinivasan Vasudevan; Hidehiko Tanizawa	6; 2	6; 2
5	(India) (Japan)	Zeeshan Ali; Shuzo Matsuoka	1; 6	6^{4} 7^{7}

=== Second round ===
==== China vs. Indonesia ====
China
4
International Tennis Centre, Beijing, China
4–6 May 1990
Hard

Indonesia
1

			1	2	3	4	5
1	(China) (Indonesia)	Xia Jiaping; Daniel Heryanto	3; 6	6; 3	7; 5	2; 6	6; 3
2	(China) (Indonesia)	Pan Bing; Hary Suharyadi	3; 6	3; 6	6; 4	6; 1	6; 3
3	(China) (Indonesia)	Liu Shuhua / Pan Bing; Daniel Heryanto / Bonit Wiryawan	6; 2	4; 6	6^{5} 7^{7}	6; 3	4; 6
4	(China) (Indonesia)	Pan Bing; Daniel Heryanto	6; 3	6; 1	6; 2
5	(China) (Indonesia)	Xia Jiaping; Hary Suharyadi	7; 5	6; 0

==== South Korea vs. India ====
South Korea
5
Dongdaemun Stadium, Seoul, South Korea
5–6 May 1990
Clay

India
0

			1	2	3	4	5
1	(South Korea) (India)	Kim Bong-soo; Srinivasan Vasudevan	6^{4} 7^{7}	3; 6	6; 4	6; 0	7; 5
2	(South Korea) (India)	Kim Jae-sik; Zeeshan Ali	6; 3	6; 2	6; 4
3	(South Korea) (India)	Bae Nam-ju / Yoo Jin-sun; Zeeshan Ali / Leander Paes	2; 6	6; 0	6; 1	3; 6	9; 7
4	(South Korea) (India)	Kim Jae-sik; Rohit Rajpal	6; 1	6; 2
5	(South Korea) (India)	Kim Bong-soo; Leander Paes	7^{7} 6^{4}	6; 0

== Group II ==
The winner in Group II advanced to the Asia/Oceania Zone Group I in 1991.

=== Participating nations ===
- Bahrain
- Bangladesh
- Chinese Taipei
- Hong Kong
- Iraq
- Jordan
- Kuwait
- Malaysia
- Singapore
- Sri Lanka
- Syria
- Thailand

==== Draw ====
First Round; 2–4 February
Hong Kong
bye
Amman, Jordan (indoor hard)
Jordan	0
Malaysia	5
Bangladesh
bye
Singapore (grass)
Singapore	0
Chinese Taipei	5
Manama, Bahrain (hard)
Iraq	2
Bahrain	3
bye
Sri Lanka
Kuwait City, Kuwait (hard)
Kuwait	4
Syria	1
bye
Thailand

Second Round; 30 March–1 April
Kuala Lumpur, Malaysia (indoor hard)
Hong Kong	4
Malaysia	1
Dhaka, Bangladesh (hard)
Bangladesh	0
Chinese Taipei	5
Colombo, Sri Lanka (clay)
Bahrain	1
Sri Lanka	4
Kuwait City, Kuwait (hard)
Kuwait	0
Thailand	5

Third Round; 15–17 June
Kowloon, Hong Kong (hard)
Hong Kong	4
Chinese Taipei	1
Colombo, Sri Lanka (clay)
Sri Lanka	1
Thailand	4

Third Round; 20–22 July
Bangkok, Thailand (hard)
Hong Kong	2
Thailand	3

- Thailand promoted to Group I in 1991.

=== First round ===
==== Jordan vs. Malaysia ====
Jordan
0
King Hussein Sports Palace, Amman, Jordan
2–4 February 1990
Hard (indoors)

Malaysia
5

			1	2	3	4	5
1	(Jordan) (Malaysia)	Aymen Abou Jaber; Adam Malik	1; 6	0; 6	1; 6
2	(Jordan) (Malaysia)	Hani Al Ali; Selvam Veerasingam	3; 6	6^{2} 7^{7}	2; 6
3	(Jordan) (Malaysia)	Hani Al Ali / Eyad Shahadeh; Adam Malik / Selvam Veerasingam	2; 6	1; 6	4; 6
4	(Jordan) (Malaysia)	Furat Hammadi; Ka-Vhei Kam	1; 6	2; 6	1; 6
5	(Jordan) (Malaysia)	Aymen Abou Jaber; Mulari Dharan	4; 6	1; 6

==== Singapore vs. Chinese Taipei ====
Singapore
0
Singapore Cricket Club, Singapore
2–4 February 1990
Grass

Chinese Taipei
5

			1	2	3	4	5
1	(Singapore) (Chinese Taipei)	Hashim Bin Sidek; Liu Chung-hsing	5; 7	6^{1} 7^{7}	2; 6
2	(Singapore) (Chinese Taipei)	Victor Pereira; Lien Yu-hui	6; 4	3; 6	5; 7	1; 6
3	(Singapore) (Chinese Taipei)	Hashim Bin Sidek / Victor Pereira; Hsu Huang-jung / Lien Yu-hui	2; 6	4; 6	4; 6
4	(Singapore) (Chinese Taipei)	Victor Pereira; Liu Chung-hsing	4; 6	3; 6
5	(Singapore) (Chinese Taipei)	Sunny Liu; Lien Yu-hui	1; 6	2; 6

==== Bahrain vs. Iraq ====
Bahrain
3
Isa Town Tennis Stadium, Manama, Bahrain
2–4 February 1990
Hard

Iraq
2

			1	2	3	4	5
1	(Bahrain) (Iraq)	Mohammed-Ahmed Saleh; Ali Kadhim	2; 6	5; 7	3; 6
2	(Bahrain) (Iraq)	Esam Abdulaal; Kadhim Kadhim	6; 2	7^{7} 6^{4}	2; 6	6; 1
3	(Bahrain) (Iraq)	Esam Abdulaal / Abdul-Rahman Shehab; Ali Kadhim / Kadhim Kadhim	6; 4	7^{7} 6^{4}	7^{8} 6^{6}
4	(Bahrain) (Iraq)	Mohammed-Ahmed Saleh; Kadhim Kadhim	0; 6	4; 6	2; 6
5	(Bahrain) (Iraq)	Esam Abdulaal; Ali Kadhim	6; 4	6; 1	6; 0

==== Kuwait vs. Syria ====
Kuwait
4
National Tennis Centre, Kuwait City, Kuwait
2–4 February 1990
Hard

Syria
1

			1	2	3	4	5
1	(Kuwait) (Syria)	Khaled Ashkanani; Samer Mourad	7; 5	6; 4	2; 6	6; 2
2	(Kuwait) (Syria)	Khaled Al Foudari; Dawood Dawoodian	7^{7} 6^{4}	7^{11} 6^{9}	6; 2
3	(Kuwait) (Syria)	Aymen-Ibrahim Al-Ashwak / Khaled Ashkanani; Dawood Dawoodian / Annis Hafeez	6; 4	6; 4	6; 1
4	(Kuwait) (Syria)	Tareq Hadeed; Dawood Dawoodian	3; 6	3; 6
5	(Kuwait) (Syria)	Khaled Al Foudari; Samer Mourad	6^{3} 7^{7}	6; 3	6; 3

=== Second round ===
==== Malaysia vs. Hong Kong ====
Malaysia
1
National Tennis Centre, Kuala Lumpur, Malaysia
30 March–1 April 1990
Hard (indoors)

Hong Kong
4

			1	2	3	4	5
1	(Malaysia) (Hong Kong)	Selvam Veerasingam; Mark Bailey	6; 0	2; 6	4; 6	6; 2	6; 8
2	(Malaysia) (Hong Kong)	Mulari Dharan; Colin Grant	3; 6	2; 6	2; 6
3	(Malaysia) (Hong Kong)	Ka-Vhei Kam / Selvam Veerasingam; Rolf Harrison / Pang Lui	6^{7} 7^{9}	6; 3	3; 6	0; 6
4	(Malaysia) (Hong Kong)	Selvam Veerasingam; Colin Grant	7^{12} 6^{10}	6; 4
5	(Malaysia) (Hong Kong)	Mulari Dharan; Mark Bailey	4; 6	2; 6

==== Bangladesh vs. Chinese Taipei ====
Bangladesh
0
National Tennis Complex, Dhaka, Bangladesh
30 March–1 April 1990
Hard

Chinese Taipei
5

			1	2	3	4	5
1	(Bangladesh) (Chinese Taipei)	Hira Lal; Lien Yu-hui	1; 6	1; 6	4; 6
2	(Bangladesh) (Chinese Taipei)	Faisal Rahman; Liu Chung-hsing	2; 6	3; 6	5; 7
3	(Bangladesh) (Chinese Taipei)	Faisal Rahman / Mahtabur Rahman; Chung Tze-ming / Hsu Huang-jung	2; 6	1; 6	6; 4	6^{3} 7^{7}
4	(Bangladesh) (Chinese Taipei)	Hira Lal; Liu Chung-hsing	1; 6	1; 6
5	(Bangladesh) (Chinese Taipei)	Faisal Rahman; Lien Yu-hui	1; 6	3; 6

==== Sri Lanka vs. Bahrain ====
Sri Lanka
4
Sri Lanka Tennis Association, Colombo, Sri Lanka
30 March–1 April 1990
Clay

Bahrain
1

			1	2	3	4	5
1	(Sri Lanka) (Bahrain)	Umesha Wallooppillai; Esam Abdulaal	6; 1	6; 2	6; 1
2	(Sri Lanka) (Bahrain)	Arjun Fernando; Nader Abdul-Aal	6; 0	6; 0	6; 1
3	(Sri Lanka) (Bahrain)	Rohan de Silva / Arjun Fernando; Esam Abdulaal / Abdul-Rahman Shehab	6; 2	6; 0	6; 0
4	(Sri Lanka) (Bahrain)	Umesha Wallooppillai; Nader Abdul-Aal	6; 1	6; 0
5	(Sri Lanka) (Bahrain)	Malik-Sanjaya Wijemanne; Esam Abdulaal	6; 1	6^{4} 7^{7}	5; 7

==== Kuwait vs. Thailand ====
Kuwait
0
National Tennis Centre, Kuwait City, Kuwait
30 March–1 April 1990
Hard

Thailand
5

			1	2	3	4	5
1	(Kuwait) (Thailand)	Khaled Al Foudari; Woraphol Thongkhamchu	4; 6	1; 6	0; 6
2	(Kuwait) (Thailand)	Aymen-Ibrahim Al-Ashwak; Tanakorn Srichaphan	5; 7	4; 6	4; 6
3	(Kuwait) (Thailand)	Khaled Al Foudari / Khaled Ashkanani; Vittaya Samrej / Narathorn Srichaphan	4; 6	2; 6	6; 2	1; 6
4	(Kuwait) (Thailand)	Khaled Al Foudari; Tanakorn Srichaphan	2; 6	2; 6
5	(Kuwait) (Thailand)	Aymen-Ibrahim Al-Ashwak; Woraphol Thongkhamchu	4; 6	0; 6

=== Third round ===
==== Hong Kong vs. Chinese Taipei ====
Hong Kong
4
South China Athletic Association, Kowloon, Hong Kong
15–17 June 1990
Hard

Chinese Taipei
1

			1	2	3	4	5
1	(Hong Kong) (Chinese Taipei)	Mark Bailey; Liu Chung-hsing	1; 6	6; 3	7^{7} 6^{5}	6; 0
2	(Hong Kong) (Chinese Taipei)	Colin Grant; Lien Yu-hui	3; 6	7^{7} 6^{4}	6; 2	6; 1
3	(Hong Kong) (Chinese Taipei)	Rolf Harrison / Pang Lui; Hsu Huang-jung / Liu Chung-hsing	6; 4	3; 6	6^{5} 7^{7}	6; 3	6; 8
4	(Hong Kong) (Chinese Taipei)	Mark Bailey; Lien Yu-hui	7; 5	6; 3	6; 2
5	(Hong Kong) (Chinese Taipei)	Colin Grant; Liu Chung-hsing	6; 3	6; 4

==== Sri Lanka vs. Thailand ====
Sri Lanka
1
Sri Lanka Tennis Association, Colombo, Sri Lanka
15–17 June 1990
Clay

Thailand
4

			1	2	3	4	5
1	(Sri Lanka) (Thailand)	Umesha Wallooppillai; Tanakorn Srichaphan	2; 6	5; 7	5; 7
2	(Sri Lanka) (Thailand)	Arjun Fernando; Woraphol Thongkhamchu	7^{8} 6^{6}	7; 5	0; 6	3; 6	2; 6
3	(Sri Lanka) (Thailand)	Rohan de Silva / Arjun Fernando; Panomkorn Pladchurnil / Vittaya Samrej	5; 7	6^{6} 7^{8}	6^{5} 7^{7}
4	(Sri Lanka) (Thailand)	Rohan de Silva; Tanakorn Srichaphan	6; 4	7^{9} 6^{7}	3; 6	7^{7} 6^{4}
5	(Sri Lanka) (Thailand)	Jayendra Wijeyesekera; Woraphol Thongkhamchu	4; 6	4; 6	1; 6

=== Fourth round ===
==== Thailand vs. Hong Kong ====
Thailand
3
National Tennis Centre, Bangkok, Thailand
20–22 July 1990
Hard

Hong Kong
2

			1	2	3	4	5
1	(Thailand) (Hong Kong)	Woraphol Thongkhamchu; Colin Grant	1; 6	6; 3	3; 6	3; 6
2	(Thailand) (Hong Kong)	Tanakorn Srichaphan; Mark Bailey	6; 2	6; 3	2; 6	6; 0
3	(Thailand) (Hong Kong)	Panomkorn Pladchurnil / Vittaya Samrej; Mark Bailey / Colin Grant	5; 7	3; 6	0; 6
4	(Thailand) (Hong Kong)	Woraphol Thongkhamchu; Mark Bailey	7; 5	3; 6	6; 3	6; 2
5	(Thailand) (Hong Kong)	Tanakorn Srichaphan; Colin Grant	4; 6	7; 5	6; 3	6; 1
