= 1994 Davis Cup Asia/Oceania Zone Group II =

International tennis competition

The Asia/Oceania Zone was one of the three zones of the regional Davis Cup competition in 1994.

In the Asia/Oceania Zone there were three different tiers, called groups, in which teams compete against each other to advance to the upper tier. Winners in Group II advanced to the Asia/Oceania Zone Group I. Teams who lost their respective ties competed in the relegation play-offs, with winning teams remaining in Group II, whereas teams who lost their play-offs were relegated to the Asia/Oceania Zone Group III in 1995.

== Participating nations ==
- Chinese Taipei
- Iran
- Malaysia
- Pakistan
- Saudi Arabia
- Singapore
- Sri Lanka
- Thailand

=== Draw ===
Relegation Play-offs
Singapore (hard)
Malaysia	4
Singapore	1
Colombo, Sri Lanka (clay)
Saudi Arabia	0
Sri Lanka	5

First Round
Taichung, Taiwan (clay)
Chinese Taipei	3
Malaysia	2
Singapore (hard)
Singapore	0
Pakistan	4
Riyadh, Saudi Arabia (hard)
Iran	3
Saudi Arabia	2
Bangkok, Thailand (hard)
Sri Lanka	0
Thailand	5

Second Round
Taichung, Taiwan (clay)
Chinese Taipei	3
Pakistan	2
Tehran, Iran (clay)
Iran	4
Thailand	1

Third Round
Taoyuan, Taiwan (indoor hard)
Chinese Taipei	4
Iran	1

- Singapore and Saudi Arabia relegated to Group III in 1995.
- Chinese Taipei promoted to Group I in 1995.

== First round ==
=== Chinese Taipei vs. Malaysia ===
Chinese Taipei
3
Chung Hsing Tennis Club, Taichung, Taiwan
4–6 February 1994
Clay

Malaysia
2

			1	2	3	4	5
1	(Chinese Taipei) (Malaysia)	Lien Yu-hui; Adam Malik	7^{7} 6^{4}	2; 6	6^{6} 7^{8}	5; 7
2	(Chinese Taipei) (Malaysia)	Chen Chih-jung; Ramayah Ramachandran	6; 3	6; 1	6; 3
3	(Chinese Taipei) (Malaysia)	Chen Chih-jung / Lien Yu-hui; Adam Malik / Ramayah Ramachandran	4; 6	6; 3	1; 6	6^{4} 7^{7}
4	(Chinese Taipei) (Malaysia)	Chen Chih-jung; Adam Malik	7^{8} 6^{6}	6; 2	6; 4
5	(Chinese Taipei) (Malaysia)	Lien Yu-hui; Ramayah Ramachandran	6; 1	7; 5	6; 3

=== Singapore vs. Pakistan ===
Singapore
0
Singapore Island Country Club, Singapore
4–6 February 1994
Hard

Pakistan
4

			1	2	3	4	5
1	(Singapore) (Pakistan)	Lam Ju-min; Omer Rashid	1; 6	4; 6	3; 6
2	(Singapore) (Pakistan)	Mark Choy; Mohamed-Khaliq Siddiq	1; 6	1; 6	1; 6
3	(Singapore) (Pakistan)	Lim Yang-tat / Liu Wai-yaw; Mohamed-Khaliq Siddiq / Omer Rashid	3; 6	6^{5} 7^{7}	3; 6
4	(Singapore) (Pakistan)	Lam Ju-min; Mohamed-Khaliq Siddiq	3; 6	2; 6
5	(Singapore) (Pakistan)	Mark Choy; Omer Rashid	0; 3					not completed

=== Saudi Arabia vs. Iran ===
Saudi Arabia
2
InterContinental Hotel Tennis Centre, Riyadh, Saudi Arabia
4–6 February 1994
Hard

Iran
3

			1	2	3	4	5
1	(Saudi Arabia) (Iran)	Bader Mohammed Almuqail; Ramin Raziani	4; 6	4; 6	4; 6
2	(Saudi Arabia) (Iran)	Zulfiqar Ahmed; Mohammed-Reza Tavakoli	7^{8} 6^{6}	6; 2	7; 5
3	(Saudi Arabia) (Iran)	Othman Al-Anazi / Bader Mohammed Almuqail; Kamyab Derafshijavan / Jahanbakhsh Souri	7^{7} 6^{3}	2; 6	1; 6	2; 6
4	(Saudi Arabia) (Iran)	Othman Al-Anazi; Mohammed-Reza Tavakoli	5; 7	2; 6	4; 6
5	(Saudi Arabia) (Iran)	Zulfiqar Ahmed; Ramin Raziani	7^{8} 6^{6}	6; 4

=== Thailand vs. Sri Lanka ===
Thailand
5
Hua Mark Tennis Centre, Bangkok, Thailand
4–6 February 1994
Hard

Sri Lanka
0

			1	2	3	4	5
1	(Thailand) (Sri Lanka)	Narathorn Srichaphan; Jayendra Wijeyesekera	6; 3	6; 0	6; 3
2	(Thailand) (Sri Lanka)	Woraphol Thongkhamchu; Rohan de Silva	6; 2	6; 1	6; 1
3	(Thailand) (Sri Lanka)	Vittaya Samrej / Tanakorn Srichaphan; Senaka Kumara / Jayendra Wijeyesekera	6; 3	6; 4	6; 3
4	(Thailand) (Sri Lanka)	Narathorn Srichaphan; Rohan de Silva	6; 3	7; 5
5	(Thailand) (Sri Lanka)	Woraphol Thongkhamchu; Jayendra Wijeyesekera	6; 0	6; 0

== Second round ==
=== Chinese Taipei vs. Pakistan ===
Chinese Taipei
3
Chung Hsing Tennis Club, Taichung, Taiwan
25–27 March 1994
Clay

Pakistan
2

			1	2	3	4	5
1	(Chinese Taipei) (Pakistan)	Lien Yu-hui; Omer Rashid	6^{5} 7^{7}	6; 3	5; 7	6; 3	5; 7
2	(Chinese Taipei) (Pakistan)	Chen Chih-jung; Mohamed-Khaliq Siddiq	4; 6	6; 3	6; 4	6; 3
3	(Chinese Taipei) (Pakistan)	Chen Chih-jung / Lien Yu-hui; Mohamed-Khaliq Siddiq / Hamed-ul-Haq	6; 2	6; 2	7; 5
4	(Chinese Taipei) (Pakistan)	Chen Chih-jung; Omer Rashid	6^{5} 7^{7}	5; 7	6; 4	6; 0	6; 4
5	(Chinese Taipei) (Pakistan)	Lien Yu-hui; Mohamed-Khaliq Siddiq	6^{5} 7^{7}	3; 6

=== Iran vs. Thailand ===
Iran
4
Enghelab Sport Complex, Tehran, Iran
25–27 March 1994
Clay

Thailand
1

			1	2	3	4	5
1	(Iran) (Thailand)	Mansour Bahrami; Woraphol Thongkhamchu	6; 3	6; 1	0; 6	6; 4
2	(Iran) (Thailand)	Ramin Raziani; Narathorn Srichaphan	6; 2	2; 6	3; 6	6; 3	6; 2
3	(Iran) (Thailand)	Mansour Bahrami / Kamyab Derafshijavan; Vittaya Samrej / Tanakorn Srichaphan	6; 4	6; 3	6; 3
4	(Iran) (Thailand)	Mansour Bahrami; Tanakorn Srichaphan	2; 6	6; 3	6; 1
5	(Iran) (Thailand)	Ramin Raziani; Woraphol Thongkhamchu	7^{9} 6^{7}	1; 6	1; 6

== Relegation play-off ==
=== Singapore vs. Malaysia ===
Singapore
1
Singapore Island Country Club, Singapore
25–27 March 1994
Hard

Malaysia
4

			1	2	3	4	5
1	(Singapore) (Malaysia)	Chen Chee-yen; Khoo Kim-huat	4; 6	6; 1	6; 3	6; 4
2	(Singapore) (Malaysia)	Lim Yang-tat; Adam Malik	1; 6	2; 6	2; 6
3	(Singapore) (Malaysia)	Chen Chee-yen / Lim Yang-tat; Adam Malik / Ramayah Ramachandran	6^{4} 7^{7}	5; 7	1; 6
4	(Singapore) (Malaysia)	Chen Chee-yen; Adam Malik	4; 6	2; 6	2; 6
5	(Singapore) (Malaysia)	Lim Yang-tat; Khoo Kim-huat	4; 6	7; 5	5; 7

=== Sri Lanka vs. Saudi Arabia ===
Sri Lanka
5
National Tennis Centre, Colombo, Sri Lanka
25–27 March 1994
Clay

Saudi Arabia
0

			1	2	3	4	5
1	(Sri Lanka) (Saudi Arabia)	Jayendra Wijeyesekera; Zulfiqar Ahmed	6; 1	7; 5	6; 0
2	(Sri Lanka) (Saudi Arabia)	Rohan de Silva; Othman Al-Anazi	6; 1	6; 3	4; 0			retired
3	(Sri Lanka) (Saudi Arabia)	Rohan de Silva / Jayendra Wijeyesekera; Zulfiqar Ahmed / Tawfik Al-Ibrahim	7; 5	6; 3	6; 2
4	(Sri Lanka) (Saudi Arabia)	Jayendra Wijeyesekera; Farah Al-Somali	6; 2	6; 3
5	(Sri Lanka) (Saudi Arabia)	Rohan de Silva; Zulfiqar Ahmed	7^{7} 6^{4}	6; 2

== Third round ==
=== Chinese Taipei vs. Iran ===
Chinese Taipei
4
National PE&S Colisseum, Taoyuan, Taiwan
29 April–1 May 1994
Hard (indoors)

Iran
1

			1	2	3	4	5
1	(Chinese Taipei) (Iran)	Chen Chih-jung; Ramin Raziani	3; 6	6; 4	5; 7	6; 4	8; 6
2	(Chinese Taipei) (Iran)	Lien Yu-hui; Mansour Bahrami	2; 6	4; 6	6; 3	7^{13} 6^{11}	5; 2	retired
3	(Chinese Taipei) (Iran)	Chen Chih-jung / Lien Yu-hui; Mansour Bahrami / Kamyab Derafshijavan	6; 3	7^{7} 6^{0}	6; 3
4	(Chinese Taipei) (Iran)	Su Wei-yu; Mansour Bahrami	6; 3	3; 6	6; 3
5	(Chinese Taipei) (Iran)	Tsai Chia-yen; Ramin Raziani	2; 6	4; 6
