= 1991 Davis Cup World Group qualifying round =

Men's tennis event

The 1991 Davis Cup World Group qualifying round was held from 20 to 22 September. They were the main play-offs of the 1991 Davis Cup. The winners of the playoffs advanced to the 1992 Davis Cup World Group, and the losers were relegated to their respective Zonal Regions I.

== Teams ==
Bold indicates team had qualified for the 1992 Davis Cup World Group. From World Group

- Austria
- **Belgium**
- **Canada**
- Israel
- **Italy**
- Mexico
- New Zealand
- **Sweden**

From Americas Group I

- **Brazil**
- Cuba

From Asia/Oceania Group I

- India
- Philippines

From Europe/Africa Group I

- Denmark
- **Great Britain**
- **Netherlands**
- **Switzerland**

|}

== Results summary ==
Date: 20–22 September

The eight losing teams in the World Group first round ties and eight winners of the Zonal Group I final round ties competed in the World Group qualifying round for spots in the 1992 World Group.

Home team	Score	Visiting team	Location	Venue	Door	Surface	Ref.
**Great Britain**	3–1	Austria	Manchester	Northern Lawn Tennis Club	Outdoor	Grass	
**Belgium**	4–1	Israel	Brussels	Royal Primerose Tennis Club	Outdoor	Clay	
**Brazil**	4–1	India	São Paulo	Esporte Clube Pinheiros	Outdoor	Clay	
Cuba	2–3	**Canada**	Havana	Complejo de Canchas	Outdoor	Hard	
**Italy**	4–1	Denmark	Bari	Bari Tennis Club	Outdoor	Clay	
Mexico	0–5	**Netherlands**	Mexico City	Club Alemán de México	Outdoor	Clay	
**Switzerland**	5–0	New Zealand	Baden	Bareeg Tennis Club	Indoor	Carpet	
Philippines	0–5	**Sweden**	Manila	Ninoy Aquino Stadium	Indoor	Carpet	

- Belgium, Canada, Italy and Sweden remain in the World Group in 1992.
- Brazil, Great Britain, Netherlands and Switzerland are promoted to the World Group in 1992.
- Cuba, Denmark, India and Philippines remain in Zonal Group I in 1992.
- Austria, Israel, Mexico and New Zealand are relegated to Zonal Group I in 1992.

== Qualifying results ==
=== Great Britain vs. Austria ===
Great Britain
3
Northern Lawn Tennis Club, Manchester, United Kingdom
20–22 September 1991
Grass

Austria
1

			1	2	3	4	5
1	(United Kingdom) (Austria)	**Jeremy Bates**; Thomas Buchmayer	**6**; 2	4; **6**	**6**; 3	**7**; 5
2	(United Kingdom) (Austria)	**Mark Petchey**; Thomas Muster	**6**; 2	3; **6**	**7^{7}** 6^{5}	**6**; 2
3	(United Kingdom) (Austria)	**Jeremy Bates / Nick Brown**; Gerald Mandl / Thomas Muster	6^{1} **7^{7}**	**6**; 3	**6**; 0	**7**; 5
4	(United Kingdom) (Austria)	Jeremy Bates; **Gerald Mandl**	5; **7**	**6**; 4	8; **10**
5	(United Kingdom) (Austria)	Mark Petchey; Thomas Buchmayer	6; 6					**not** **completed**

=== Belgium vs. Israel ===
Belgium
4
Royal Primerose Tennis Club, Brussels, Belgium
20–22 September 1991
Clay

Israel
1

			1	2	3	4	5
1	(Belgium) (Israel)	**Eduardo Masso**; Amos Mansdorf	3; **6**	**7^{7}** 6^{3}	**6**; 4	**6**; 1
2	(Belgium) (Israel)	**Bart Wuyts**; Gilad Bloom	**7^{7}** 6^{4}	**6**; 1	5; **7**	**6**; 2
3	(Belgium) (Israel)	Filip Dewulf / Tom Vanhoudt; **Gilad Bloom / Shahar Perkiss**	6^{4} **7^{7}**	5; **7**	**6**; 4	5; **7**
4	(Belgium) (Israel)	**Bart Wuyts**; Amos Mansdorf	**6**; 2	5; **7**	**7^{7}** 6^{3}	**6**; 1
5	(Belgium) (Israel)	**Eduardo Masso**; Gilad Bloom	**7^{8}** 6^{6}	**6**; 3

=== Brazil vs. India ===
Brazil
4
Esporte Clube Pinheiros, São Paulo, Brazil
20–22 September 1991
Clay

India
1

			1	2	3	4	5
1	(Brazil) (India)	**Jaime Oncins**; Ramesh Krishnan	**6**; 2	**6**; 2	**6**; 3
2	(Brazil) (India)	**Luiz Mattar**; Leander Paes	**6**; 4	**6**; 3	**6**; 2
3	(Brazil) (India)	Nelson Aerts / Fernando Roese; **Ramesh Krishnan / Leander Paes**	6^{1} **7^{7}**	**7^{7}** 6^{5}	**6**; 3	3; **6**	4; **6**
4	(Brazil) (India)	**Luiz Mattar**; Ramesh Krishnan	5; **7**	**6**; 3	**6**; 3	**6**; 4
5	(Brazil) (India)	**Jaime Oncins**; Leander Paes	**6**; 4	**6**; 1

=== Cuba vs. Canada ===
Cuba
2
Complejo de Canchas, Havana, Cuba
20–22 September 1991
Hard

Canada
3

			1	2	3	4	5
1	(Cuba) (Canada)	**Mario Tabares**; Andrew Sznajder	**6**; 3	2; **6**	3; **6**	**6**; 3	**8**; 6
2	(Cuba) (Canada)	Juan Pino; **Grant Connell**	6^{2} **7^{7}**	3; **6**	2; **6**
3	(Cuba) (Canada)	Juan Pino / Mario Tabares; **Grant Connell / Sébastien Lareau**	4; **6**	6^{4} **7^{7}**	**6**; 4	**6**; 4	3; **6**
4	(Cuba) (Canada)	Mario Tabares; **Grant Connell**	1; **6**	3; **6**	4; **6**
5	(Cuba) (Canada)	**Juan Pino**; Andrew Sznajder	**6**; 3	**6**; 1

=== Italy vs. Denmark ===
Italy
4
Bari Tennis Club, Bari, Italy
20–22 September 1991
Clay

Denmark
1

			1	2	3	4	5
1	(Italy) (Denmark)	Omar Camporese; **Frederik Fetterlein**	**6**; 3	3; **6**	2; **6**	4; **6**
2	(Italy) (Denmark)	**Claudio Pistolesi**; Michael Tauson	**6**; 1	**6**; 2	**7^{7}** 6^{4}
3	(Italy) (Denmark)	**Omar Camporese / Diego Nargiso**; Frederik Fetterlein / Michael Tauson	**6**; 3	**6**; 3	**6**; 4
4	(Italy) (Denmark)	**Omar Camporese**; Michael Tauson	**7^{7}** 6^{5}	**6**; 1	**6**; 2
5	(Italy) (Denmark)	**Claudio Pistolesi**; Frederik Fetterlein	**7^{7}** 6^{3}	**6**; 3

=== Mexico vs. Netherlands ===
Mexico
0
Club Alemán de México, Mexico City, Mexico
20–22 September 1991
Clay

Netherlands
5

			1	2	3	4	5
1	(Mexico) (Netherlands)	Luis Herrera; **Mark Koevermans**	3; **6**	4; **6**	4; **6**
2	(Mexico) (Netherlands)	Leonardo Lavalle; **Paul Haarhuis**	**6**; 4	6^{3} **7^{7}**	5; **7**	2; **6**
3	(Mexico) (Netherlands)	Leonardo Lavalle / Jorge Lozano; **Richard Krajicek / Jan Siemerink**	2; **6**	3; **6**	4; **6**
4	(Mexico) (Netherlands)	Luis Herrera; **Paul Haarhuis**	3; **6**	3; **6**
5	(Mexico) (Netherlands)	Leonardo Lavalle; **Mark Koevermans**	2; **6**	4; **6**

=== Switzerland vs. New Zealand ===
Switzerland
5
Bareeg Tennis Club, Baden, Switzerland
20–22 September 1991
Carpet (indoors)

New Zealand
0

			1	2	3	4	5
1	(Switzerland) (New Zealand)	**Marc Rosset**; Brett Steven	**7**; 5	**6**; 4	**6**; 4
2	(Switzerland) (New Zealand)	**Jakob Hlasek**; Kelly Evernden	**7^{7}** 6^{2}	**6**; 4	**6**; 3
3	(Switzerland) (New Zealand)	**Jakob Hlasek / Marc Rosset**; Kelly Evernden / Brett Steven	4; **6**	**7^{7}** 6^{4}	**6**; 3	**6**; 4
4	(Switzerland) (New Zealand)	**Jakob Hlasek**; Brett Steven	**7**; 5	**6**; 4
5	(Switzerland) (New Zealand)	**Marc Rosset**; Kelly Evernden	**7^{7}** 6^{3}	3; **6**	**6**; 3

=== Philippines vs. Sweden ===
Philippines
0
Ninoy Aquino Stadium, Manila, Philippines
20–22 September 1991
Carpet (indoors)

Sweden
5

			1	2	3	4	5
1	(Philippines) (Sweden)	Felix Barrientos; **Nicklas Kulti**	3; **6**	1; **6**	4; **6**
2	(Philippines) (Sweden)	Roland So; **Christian Bergström**	1; **6**	5; **7**	1; **6**
3	(Philippines) (Sweden)	Felix Barrientos / Sofronio Palahang; **Rikard Bergh / Christian Bergström**	4; **6**	2; **6**	2; **6**
4	(Philippines) (Sweden)	Felix Barrientos; **Christian Bergström**	0; **6**	4; **6**
5	(Philippines) (Sweden)	Roland So; **Nicklas Kulti**	2; **6**	6^{3} **7^{7}**
