= 1999 Davis Cup Asia/Oceania Zone Group I =

International tennis competition

The Asia/Oceania Zone was one of the three zones of the regional Davis Cup competition in 1999.

In the Asia/Oceania Zone there were four different tiers, called groups, in which teams competed against each other to advance to the upper tier. Winners in Group I advanced to the World Group qualifying round, along with losing teams from the World Group first round. Teams who lost their respective ties competed in the relegation play-offs, with winning teams remaining in Group I, whereas teams who lost their play-offs were relegated to the Asia/Oceania Zone Group II in 2000.

== Participating nations ==
- China
- India
- Japan
- Lebanon
- Pakistan
- New Zealand
- South Korea
- Uzbekistan

=== Draw ===
Second Round Play-offs
Shenzhen, China (hard)
China	3
Pakistan	0

First Round Play-offs
Calcutta, India (grass)
India	5
China	0
Beirut, Lebanon (indoor hard)
Pakistan	1
Lebanon	4

First Round
Seogwipo, South Korea (hard)
India	2
South Korea	3
Shenzhen, China (hard)
New Zealand	3
China	2
Tashkent, Uzbekistan (indoor hard)
Pakistan	1
Uzbekistan	4
Zouk Mikael, Lebanon (indoor hard)
Lebanon	1
Japan	4

Second Round
Christchurch, New Zealand (indoor hard)
South Korea	2
New Zealand	3
Fukushima, Japan (indoor carpet)
Uzbekistan	3
Japan	2

- Pakistan relegated to Group II in 2000.
- New Zealand and Uzbekistan advance to World Group qualifying round.

== First round ==
=== South Korea vs. India ===
South Korea
3
Municipal Courts, Seogwipo, South Korea
19–21 February 1999
Hard

India
2

			1	2	3	4	5
1	(South Korea) (India)	Lee Hyung-taik; Mahesh Bhupathi	6; 1	7; 5	6; 2
2	(South Korea) (India)	Yoon Yong-il; Leander Paes	4; 6	3; 6	7; 5	6; 2	6; 1
3	(South Korea) (India)	Kim Dong-hyun / Lee Hyung-taik; Mahesh Bhupathi / Leander Paes	3; 6	3; 6	4; 6
4	(South Korea) (India)	Lee Hyung-taik; Leander Paes	4; 6	4; 6	4; 6
5	(South Korea) (India)	Yoon Yong-il; Mahesh Bhupathi	6^{5} 7^{7}	6; 1	6; 1	6; 1

=== China vs. New Zealand ===
China
2
Mission Hills Tennis Centre, Shenzhen, China
5–7 February 1999
Hard

New Zealand
3

			1	2	3	4	5
1	(China) (New Zealand)	Zhu Benqiang; Mark Nielsen	3; 6	2; 6	5; 7
2	(China) (New Zealand)	Zhang Yu; Alistair Hunt	6; 1	6^{3} 7^{7}	6; 3	4; 6	6; 2
3	(China) (New Zealand)	Zheng Yu / Zhu Benqiang; James Greenhalgh / Brett Steven	3; 6	4; 6	0; 6
4	(China) (New Zealand)	Zhu Benqiang; Alistair Hunt	6; 4	7^{8} 6^{6}	2; 6	6; 3
5	(China) (New Zealand)	Zhang Yu; Mark Nielsen	1; 6	3; 6	4; 6

=== Uzbekistan vs. Pakistan ===
Uzbekistan
4
Yunusabad Tennis Centre, Tashkent, Uzbekistan
12–14 February 1999
Hard (indoors)

Pakistan
1

			1	2	3	4	5
1	(Uzbekistan) (Pakistan)	Oleg Ogorodov; Mohamed-Khaliq Siddiq	6; 3	6; 3	6; 3
2	(Uzbekistan) (Pakistan)	Vadim Kutsenko; Aisam-ul-Haq Qureshi	1; 6	5; 7	4; 6
3	(Uzbekistan) (Pakistan)	Oleg Ogorodov / Dmitri Tomashevich; Mohamed-Khaliq Siddiq / Aisam-ul-Haq Qureshi	7; 5	6; 1	7; 5
4	(Uzbekistan) (Pakistan)	Oleg Ogorodov; Aisam-ul-Haq Qureshi	6; 4	6; 3	3; 6	6; 1
5	(Uzbekistan) (Pakistan)	Vadim Kutsenko; Asim Shafik	6; 0	6; 0

=== Lebanon vs. Japan ===
Lebanon
1
E.D.L Club, Zouk Mikael, Lebanon
12–14 February 1999
Hard (indoors)

Japan
4

			1	2	3	4	5
1	(Lebanon) (Japan)	Ali Hamadeh; Gouichi Motomura	3; 6	4; 6	6^{8} 7^{10}
2	(Lebanon) (Japan)	Jicham Zaatini; Satoshi Iwabuchi	6^{4} 7^{7}	4; 6	3; 6
3	(Lebanon) (Japan)	Ali Hamadeh / Jicham Zaatini; Gouichi Motomura / Thomas Shimada	3; 6	4; 6	5; 7
4	(Lebanon) (Japan)	Jicham Zaatini; Gouichi Motomura	6; 1	3; 6	5; 7
5	(Lebanon) (Japan)	Ali Hamadeh; Satoshi Iwabuchi	7^{8} 6^{6}	7^{7} 6^{3}

== Second round ==
=== New Zealand vs. South Korea ===
New Zealand
3
WestpacTrust Centre, Christchurch, New Zealand
2–4 April 1999
Hard (indoors)

South Korea
2

			1	2	3	4	5
1	(New Zealand) (South Korea)	Mark Nielsen; Lee Hyung-taik	5; 7	0; 6	4; 6
2	(New Zealand) (South Korea)	Brett Steven; Song Hyeong-keun	6; 3	6; 4	6; 4
3	(New Zealand) (South Korea)	James Greenhalgh / Brett Steven; Lee Hyung-taik / Yoon Yong-il	6; 4	6; 4	3; 6	7^{7} 6^{2}
4	(New Zealand) (South Korea)	Alistair Hunt; Lee Hyung-taik	3; 6	4; 6	0; 6
5	(New Zealand) (South Korea)	Mark Nielsen; Song Hyeong-keun	6; 3	3; 6	6; 3	6; 4

=== Japan vs. Uzbekistan ===
Japan
2
Aizu General Gymnasium, Fukushima, Japan
2–4 April 1999
Carpet (indoors)

Uzbekistan
3

			1	2	3	4	5
1	(Japan) (Uzbekistan)	Takao Suzuki; Vadim Kutsenko	6; 3	6; 4	7; 5
2	(Japan) (Uzbekistan)	Gouichi Motomura; Oleg Ogorodov	6; 2	6^{5} 7^{7}	2; 6	7^{8} 6^{6}	0; 3	retired
3	(Japan) (Uzbekistan)	Satoshi Iwabuchi / Takao Suzuki; Oleg Ogorodov / Dmitri Tomashevich	3; 6	6; 3	1; 6	4; 6
4	(Japan) (Uzbekistan)	Takao Suzuki; Oleg Ogorodov	7^{7} 6^{4}	7^{7} 6^{4}	7; 5
5	(Japan) (Uzbekistan)	Hideki Kaneko; Vadim Kutsenko	6^{5} 7^{7}	4; 6	3; 6

== First round relegation play-offs ==
=== India vs. China ===
India
5
Calcutta South Club, Calcutta, India
2–4 April 1999
Grass

China
0

			1	2	3	4	5
1	(India) (China)	Leander Paes; Zhang Yu	6; 4	6; 2	6; 3
2	(India) (China)	Syed Fazaluddin; Zhu Benqiang	7^{7} 6^{3}	6; 3	6; 4
3	(India) (China)	Mahesh Bhupathi / Leander Paes; Jiang Shan / Zhu Benqiang	6; 1	7^{7} 6^{0}	6; 4
4	(India) (China)	Leander Paes; Zhu Benqiang	6^{5} 7^{7}	7^{7} 6^{3}	6; 3
5	(India) (China)	Syed Fazaluddin; Jiang Shan	6; 3	6; 3

=== Lebanon vs. Pakistan ===
Lebanon
4
E.D.L. Club, Beirut, Lebanon
2–4 April 1999
Hard (indoors)

Pakistan
1

			1	2	3	4	5
1	(Lebanon) (Pakistan)	Jicham Zaatini; Aqeel Khan	6; 2	6; 2	6; 2
2	(Lebanon) (Pakistan)	Ali Hamadeh; Mohamed-Khaliq Siddiq	6; 3	6; 4	5; 7	6; 4
3	(Lebanon) (Pakistan)	Ali Hamadeh / Jicham Zaatini; Mohamed-Khaliq Siddiq / Asim Shafik	7^{7} 6^{3}	6; 4	6; 3
4	(Lebanon) (Pakistan)	Jicham Zaatini; Syed-Nasir Sherazi	6; 0	6; 2
5	(Lebanon) (Pakistan)	Karim Alayli; Asim Shafik	5; 7	2; 6

== Second round relegation play-offs ==
=== China vs. Pakistan ===
China
3
Mission Hills Tennis Centre, Shenzhen, China
24–26 September 1999
Hard

Pakistan
0

			1	2	3	4	5
1	(China) (Pakistan)	Zhu Benqiang; Mohamed-Khaliq Siddiq	6; 1	6; 3	6; 1
2	(China) (Pakistan)	Li Si; Aisam-ul-Haq Qureshi	3; 6	6; 4	4; 6	6; 1		retired
3	(China) (Pakistan)	Li Si / Yang Jingzhu; Mohamed-Khaliq Siddiq / Asim Shafik	6; 1	6; 2	7; 5
4	(China) (Pakistan)	Zhu Benqiang; Aisam-ul-Haq Qureshi						not played
5	(China) (Pakistan)	Li Si; Mohamed-Khaliq Siddiq						not played
