= 1981 Davis Cup Eastern Zone =

International tennis competition

The Eastern Zone was one of the three regional zones of the 1981 Davis Cup.

6 teams entered the Eastern Zone in total. With the introduction of a new tiered format, the previous year's semifinalists bypassed Zonal competition and qualified directly for the new 16-team World Group. The remaining teams would now compete for a place in the following year's World Group.

India defeated Indonesia in the final and qualified for the 1982 World Group.

== Participating nations ==
- Chinese Taipei
- India
- Indonesia
- Malaysia
- Pakistan
- Thailand

=== Draw ===
Quarterfinals; 9–11 January
India
bye
Bangkok, Thailand (hard)
Malaysia	0
Thailand	5
Taipei, Taiwan (indoor hard)
Indonesia	4
Chinese Taipei	1
bye
Pakistan

Semifinals; 13–15 February
Bangkok, Thailand (hard)
India	5
Thailand	0
Jakarta, Indonesia (clay)
Indonesia	3
Pakistan	0

Final; 6–8 March
Jakarta, Indonesia (clay)
India	3
Indonesia	2

== Quarterfinals ==
=== Thailand vs. Malaysia ===
Thailand
5
Bangkok, Thailand
9–11 January 1981
Hard

Malaysia
0

			1	2	3	4	5
1	(Thailand) (Malaysia)	Pichet Boratisa; Suresh Menon	6; 3	6; 0	4; 6	6; 0
2	(Thailand) (Malaysia)	Sombat Uamongkol; Rudy Foo	6; 3	7; 5	6; 4
3	(Thailand) (Malaysia)	Pichet Boratisa / Sombat Uamongkol; Rudy Foo / Suresh Menon	6; 2	6; 2	6; 1
4	(Thailand) (Malaysia)	Sombat Uamongkol; Suresh Menon	6; 1	6; 3	6; 3
5	(Thailand) (Malaysia)	Ponkaphan Phisaimongket; Rudy Foo	6; 4	6; 1	3; 6	6; 1

=== Chinese Taipei vs. Indonesia ===
Chinese Taipei
1
Taipei, Taiwan
9–11 January 1981
Hard (indoors)

Indonesia
4

			1	2	3	4	5
1	(Chinese Taipei) (Indonesia)	Wu Chang-rung; Tintus Arianto Wibowo	9; 11	3; 6	6; 8
2	(Chinese Taipei) (Indonesia)	Hsu Huang-jung; Yustedjo Tarik	2; 6	2; 6	4; 6
3	(Chinese Taipei) (Indonesia)	Hsu Huang-jung / Wu Chang-rung; Gondo Widjojo / Atet Wijono	6; 4	3; 6	6; 3	8; 6
4	(Chinese Taipei) (Indonesia)	Wu Chang-rung; Yustedjo Tarik	3; 6	6; 4	2; 6	2; 6
5	(Chinese Taipei) (Indonesia)	Hsu Huang-jung; Tintus Arianto Wibowo	3; 6	6; 4	5; 7	6; 3	3; 6

== Semifinals ==
=== Thailand vs. India ===
Thailand
0
Bangkok, Thailand
13–15 February 1981
Hard

India
5

			1	2	3	4	5
1	(Thailand) (India)	Sombat Uamongkol; Ramesh Krishnan	3; 6	2; 6	2; 6
2	(Thailand) (India)	Pichet Boratisa; Vijay Amritraj	2; 6	1; 6	2; 6
3	(Thailand) (India)	Pichet Boratisa / Sombat Uamongkol; Anand Amritraj / Vijay Amritraj	2; 6	4; 6	1; 6
4	(Thailand) (India)	Pichet Boratisa; Ramesh Krishnan	3; 6	2; 6	1; 6
5	(Thailand) (India)	Sombat Uamongkol; Vijay Amritraj	0; 6	2; 6	7; 9

=== Indonesia vs. Pakistan ===
Indonesia
3
Jakarta, Indonesia
13–15 February 1981
Clay

Pakistan
0

			1	2	3	4	5
1	(Indonesia) (Pakistan)	Atet Wijono; Inam-ul-Haq	6; 1	6; 2	6; 0
2	(Indonesia) (Pakistan)	Yustedjo Tarik; Saeed Meer	6; 2	6; 1	8; 10	15; 13
3	(Indonesia) (Pakistan)	Gondo Widjojo / Atet Wijono; Nadir Ali Khan / Altaf Hussain	4; 6	6; 2	6; 4	6; 1
4	(Indonesia) (Pakistan)	Atet Wijono; Saeed Meer						not played
5	(Indonesia) (Pakistan)	Yustedjo Tarik; Inam-ul-Haq						not played

== Final ==
=== Indonesia vs. India ===
Indonesia
2
Jakarta, Indonesia
6–8 March 1981
Clay

India
3

			1	2	3	4	5
1	(Indonesia) (India)	Atet Wijono; Sashi Menon	3; 6	10; 8	2; 6	3; 6
2	(Indonesia) (India)	Yustedjo Tarik; Anand Amritraj	11; 9	6; 4	5; 7	7; 9	6; 4
3	(Indonesia) (India)	Tintus Arianto Wibowo / Yustedjo Tarik; Anand Amritraj / Sashi Menon	6; 3	5; 7	9; 11	4; 6
4	(Indonesia) (India)	Yustedjo Tarik; Sashi Menon	3; 6	4; 6	2; 6
5	(Indonesia) (India)	Atet Wijono; Anand Amritraj	6; 5					retired
