= 2000 Davis Cup World Group qualifying round =

Tennis tournament

The 2000 Davis Cup World Group qualifying round was held from 14 to 23 July. They were the main play-offs of the 2000 Davis Cup. The winners of the playoffs advanced to the 2001 Davis Cup World Group, and the losers were relegated to their respective Zonal Regions I.

== Teams ==
Bold indicates team had qualified for the 2001 Davis Cup World Group.

From World Group

- Austria
- **Belgium**
- **France**
- Great Britain
- Italy
- **Netherlands**
- **Switzerland**
- Zimbabwe

From Americas Group I

- Chile
- **Ecuador**

From Asia/Oceania Group I

- India
- Uzbekistan

From Europe/Africa Group I

- Belarus
- **Morocco**
- **Romania**
- **Sweden**

== Results summary ==
Date: 14–23 July

The eight losing teams in the World Group first round ties and eight winners of the Zonal Group I final round ties competed in the World Group qualifying round for spots in the 2001 World Group.

Home team	Score	Visiting team	Location	Venue	Door	Surface	Ref.
**France**	5-0	Austria	Rennes	Le Liberté	Indoor	Carpet	
Great Britain	2-3	**Ecuador**	Wimbledon	No. 1 Court, All England Lawn Tennis Club	Outdoor	Grass	
Italy	1-4	**Belgium**	Venice	Green Garden Sporting Club	Outdoor	Clay	
**Morocco**	w/o (Note: Following crowd trouble during the second round Americas Zone Group I tie between Chile and Argentina, Chile were disqualified from the tournament. Their qualifying tie against Morocco was therefore defaulted and Morocco advanced directly to the 2001 World Group.)	Chile	—	—	—	—	
Uzbekistan	1-4	**Netherlands**	Tashkent	N.B.U. Complex	Outdoor	Clay	
**Sweden**	5-0	India	Båstad	Båstad Tennis Stadium	Outdoor	Clay	
**Switzerland**	5-0	Belarus	St. Gallen	Kreuzbleichhalle	Outdoor	Carpet	
Zimbabwe	2-3	**Romania**	Harare	City Sport Centre	Indoor	Hard	

- Belgium, France, Netherlands and Switzerland remain in the World Group in 2001.
- Ecuador, Morocco, Romania and Sweden are promoted to the World Group in 2001.
- Belarus, Chile, India and Uzbekistan remain in Zonal Group I in 2001.
- Austria, Great Britain, Italy and Zimbabwe are relegated to Zonal Group I in 2001.

== Qualifying results ==
=== France vs. Austria ===
France
5
Le Liberté, Rennes, France
21–23 July 2000
Carpet (indoors)

Austria
0

			1	2	3	4	5
1	(France) (Austria)	**Nicolas Escudé**; Jürgen Melzer	**6**; 2	**6**; 4	**6**; 2
2	(France) (Austria)	**Sébastien Grosjean**; Stefan Koubek	**6**; 3	**6**; 2	**6**; 3
3	(France) (Austria)	**Olivier Delaître / Nicolas Escudé**; Julian Knowle / Thomas Strengberger	**6**; 4	**6**; 3	**6**; 3
4	(France) (Austria)	**Jérôme Golmard**; Stefan Koubek	**6**; 4	**6**; 4
5	(France) (Austria)	**Sébastien Grosjean**; Jürgen Melzer	3; **6**	**6**; 3	**7**; 5

=== Great Britain vs. Ecuador ===
Great Britain
2
No. 1 Court, All England Lawn Tennis Club, Wimbledon, England
14–16 July 2000
Grass

Ecuador
3

			1	2	3	4	5
1	(United Kingdom) (Ecuador)	Greg Rusedski; **Nicolás Lapentti**	3; **6**	**7^{7}** 6^{3}	5; **7**	**6**; 4	5; **7**
2	(United Kingdom) (Ecuador)	**Tim Henman**; Luis Morejón	**6**; 2	**6**; 1	**6**; 4
3	(United Kingdom) (Ecuador)	Tim Henman / Arvind Parmar; **Giovanni Lapentti / Nicolás Lapentti**	3; **6**	5; **7**	3; **6**
4	(United Kingdom) (Ecuador)	**Tim Henman**; Nicolás Lapentti	**6**; 1	**6**; 4	**6**; 4
5	(United Kingdom) (Ecuador)	Arvind Parmar; **Giovanni Lapentti**	**6**; 4	**6**; 3	1; **6**	3; **6**	3; **6**

=== Italy vs. Belgium ===
Italy
1
Green Garden Sporting Club, Venice, Italy
21–23 July 2000
Clay

Belgium
4

			1	2	3	4	5
1	(Italy) (Belgium)	Andrea Gaudenzi; **Olivier Rochus**	2; **6**	5; **7**	3; **6**
2	(Italy) (Belgium)	**Davide Sanguinetti**; Filip Dewulf	1; **6**	**7^{7}** 6^{5}	**7**; 5	**6**; 0
3	(Italy) (Belgium)	Andrea Gaudenzi / Diego Nargiso; **Christophe Rochus / Tom Vanhoudt**	4; **6**	4; **6**	4; **6**
4	(Italy) (Belgium)	Davide Sanguinetti; **Christophe Rochus**	2; **6**	5; **7**	**7^{8}** 6^{6}	**6**; 1	5; **7**
5	(Italy) (Belgium)	Renzo Furlan; **Filip Dewulf**	5; **7**	2; **6**

=== Uzbekistan vs. Netherlands ===
Uzbekistan
1
N.B.U. Complex, Tashkent, Uzbekistan
14–16 July 2000
Clay

Netherlands
4

			1	2	3	4	5
1	(Uzbekistan) (Netherlands)	Oleg Ogorodov; **Richard Krajicek**	4; **6**	3; **6**	4; **6**
2	(Uzbekistan) (Netherlands)	Vadim Kutsenko; **Sjeng Schalken**	2; **6**	1; **6**	4; **6**
3	(Uzbekistan) (Netherlands)	Oleg Ogorodov / Dmitri Tomashevich; **Paul Haarhuis / Sjeng Schalken**	3; **6**	1; **6**	6^{0} **7^{7}**
4	(Uzbekistan) (Netherlands)	Vadim Kutsenko; **Paul Haarhuis**	1; **6**	2; **6**
5	(Uzbekistan) (Netherlands)	**Oleg Ogorodov**; Sjeng Schalken	**6**; 4	**6**; 3

=== Sweden vs. India ===
Sweden
5
Båstad Tennis Stadium, Båstad, Sweden
21–23 July 2000
Clay

India
0

			1	2	3	4	5
1	(Sweden) (India)	**Andreas Vinciguerra**; Harsh Mankad	**6**; 3	**6**; 1	**6**; 1
2	(Sweden) (India)	**Mikael Tillström**; Srinath Prahlad	**6**; 2	**6**; 0	**6**; 1
3	(Sweden) (India)	**Nicklas Kulti / Mikael Tillström**; Mahesh Bhupathi / Syed Fazaluddin	**6**; 3	3; **6**	4; **6**	**6**; 3	**6**; 3
4	(Sweden) (India)	**Andreas Vinciguerra**; Srinath Prahlad	**6**; 2	**6**; 1
5	(Sweden) (India)	**Mikael Tillström**; Harsh Mankad	**6**; 3	**6**; 0

=== Switzerland vs. Belarus ===
Switzerland
5
Kreuzbleichhalle, St. Gallen, Switzerland
21–23 July 2000
Carpet

Belarus
0

			1	2	3	4	5
1	(Switzerland) (Belarus)	**George Bastl**; Max Mirnyi	**6**; 4	**7^{7}** 6^{4}	**6**; 2
2	(Switzerland) (Belarus)	**Roger Federer**; Vladimir Voltchkov	4; **6**	**7**; 5	**7^{7}** 6^{1}	5; **7**	**6**; 2
3	(Switzerland) (Belarus)	**Roger Federer / Lorenzo Manta**; Max Mirnyi / Vladimir Voltchkov	2; **6**	**7^{7}** 6^{5}	**7**; 5	**7^{7}** 6^{4}
4	(Switzerland) (Belarus)	**Michel Kratochvil**; Alexander Shvets	**6**; 0	**6**; 0
5	(Switzerland) (Belarus)	**Lorenzo Manta**; Vasili Kazhera	**7^{7}** 6^{0}	**6**; 1

=== Zimbabwe vs. Romania ===
Zimbabwe
2
Harare Sports Club, Harare, Zimbabwe
14–16 July 2000
Hard (indoors)

Romania
3

			1	2	3	4	5
1	(Zimbabwe) (Romania)	**Byron Black**; Răzvan Sabău	**6**; 2	4; **6**	**7**; 5	**6**; 2
2	(Zimbabwe) (Romania)	Kevin Ullyett; **Andrei Pavel**	4; **6**	6^{2} **7^{7}**	2; **6**
3	(Zimbabwe) (Romania)	Wayne Black / Kevin Ullyett; **Andrei Pavel / Gabriel Trifu**	5; **7**	2; **6**	6^{2} **7^{7}**
4	(Zimbabwe) (Romania)	Byron Black; **Andrei Pavel**	2; **6**	4; **6**	1; **6**
5	(Zimbabwe) (Romania)	**Wayne Black**; Răzvan Sabău	**6**; 3	**7^{7}** 6^{2}
