= India Davis Cup team =

Indian national tennis team

India
- Captain: Mahesh Bhupathi
- Coach: Zeeshan Ali
- Nations Ranking: 19 ▲ +14 (12 February 2026)
- Colors: sky blue & white
- First year: 1921
- Years played: 89
- Ties played (W–L): 212 (125–87)
- Years in World Group: 16 (8–15)
- Runners-up: 3 (1966, 1974 & 1987)
- Most total wins: Leander Paes (93–35)
- Most singles wins: Ramanathan Krishnan (50–19)
- Most doubles wins: Leander Paes (45–13)
- Best doubles team: Mahesh Bhupathi/Leander Paes (25–2)
- Most ties played: Leander Paes (58)
- Most years played: Leander Paes (30)
- Last updated on: 29 September 2026.

The India Davis Cup team represents India in Davis Cup tennis competition and are governed by the All India Tennis Association.

India competed in its first Davis Cup in 1921. India finished as runners-up 3 times (1966, 1974, 1987), the most by any nation from Asia proper. In 1974, the final was scratched and South Africa were awarded the Davis Cup after India refused to participate in the final due to the South African government's apartheid policies. India were strong favorites to win with Vijay Amritraj and Anand Amritraj at their best.

Only Romania and India have contested more than one final without being crowned champion. In the 1974 Eastern Zone Final, India and Australia established a record for the most number of games in a tie, 327.

== Results and fixtures ==
The following are lists of match results and scheduled matches for the previous year and any upcoming ties.

Win Loss Fixture

=== 2026 ===
Qualifiers
First round

India
3
Karnataka State Lawn Tennis Association, Bengaluru, India
7–8 February 2026
Hard

Netherlands
2

			1	2	3
1	(India) (Netherlands)	Sumit Nagal; Guy den Ouden	0; 6	6; 4	3; 6
2	(India) (Netherlands)	Dhakshineswar Suresh; Jesper de Jong	6; 4	7; 5
3	(India) (Netherlands)	Yuki Bhambri / Dhakshineswar Suresh; Sander Arends / David Pel	7^{7} 6^{0}	3; 6	7^{7} 6^{1}
4	(India) (Netherlands)	Sumit Nagal; Jesper de Jong	7; 5	1; 6	4; 6
5	(India) (Netherlands)	Dhakshineswar Suresh; Guy den Ouden	6; 4	7^{7} 6^{4}

Qualifiers
Second round

South Korea
3
Seoul Olympic Park Tennis Center, Seoul, South Korea
18–19 September
Hard

India
1

			1	2	3
1	(South Korea) (India)	Kwon Soon-woo; Dhakshineswar Suresh	3; 6	6; 3	6; 4
2	(South Korea) (India)	Chung Hyeon; Sumit Nagal	2; 6	6; 4	7; 5
3	(South Korea) (India)	Nam Ji-sung / Park Ui-sung; Sriram Balaji / Dhakshineswar Suresh	3; 6	6; 3	3; 6
4	(South Korea) (India)	Kwon Soon-woo; Sumit Nagal	6; 1	6; 2
5	(South Korea) (India)	Chung Hyeon; Dhakshineswar Suresh				not played

== Players ==
=== Current team ===
The following players were selected for the 2026 Davis Cup Qualifiers first round held in Bengaluru, India.

Team nominations for 2026 Qualifiers first round against Netherlands.
Player	Age	ATP ranking		Debut	Nom	Ties	Win-loss			Davis Cup Profile					
Player	Age	Sumit Nagal	28	Debut	Nom	Ties	293	–	2016	Davis Cup Profile	9	9	8–6	–	8–6
Karan Singh	22	434	433	2025	2	1	1–0	–	1–0						
Dhakshineswar Suresh	25	470	459	2025	2	2	3–0	1–0	4–0						
Yuki Bhambri	33	–	18	2009	17	16	14–7	3–2	17–9						
N. Sriram Balaji	36	–	75	2017	7	6	1–2	2–2	3–4						
Non-playing captain: Rohit Rajpal

=== Notable former members ===
- Anand Amritraj
- Prakash Amritraj
- Akhtar Ali
- Zeeshan Ali
- Vijay Amritraj
- Mahesh Bhupathi
- Somdev Devvarman
- Hassan Ali Fyzee
- Nitin Kirtane
- Sandeep Kirtane
- Ramanathan Krishnan
- Ramesh Krishnan
- Naresh Kumar
- Premjit Lall
- Harsh Mankad
- Sashi Menon
- Jaidip Mukerjea
- Leander Paes
- Jasjit Singh

== Results ==
=== 1920s ===
Year	Competition	Date	Location	Surface	Opponent	Score	Result
1921	Quarter-finals	18 Jul 1921	(France) Paris	Clay	France	4–1	Won
1921	Semi-finals	20 Aug 1921	(United States) Chicago	Grass	Japan	0–5	Lost
1922	1st Round	20 Jun 1922	(United Kingdom) Beckenham	Grass	Romania	5–0	Won
1922	Quarter-finals	15 Jul 1922	(United Kingdom) Bristol	Grass	Spain	1–4	Lost
1923	Europe Zone, 1st Round	4 Jun 1923	(Republic of Ireland) Dublin	Grass	(Republic of Ireland) Ireland	2–3	Lost
1924	Europe Zone, 2nd Round	31 May 1924	(Netherlands) Arnhem	Clay	Netherlands	4–1	Won
1924	Europe Zone, Quarter-finals	19 Jun 1924	(France) Paris	Clay	France	0–4	Lost
1925	Europe Zone, 1st Round	18 May 1925	(Belgium) Brussels	—N/a	Belgium	3–2	Won
1925	Europe Zone, Quarter-finals	14 Jun 1925	Austria	—N/a	Austria	4–0	Won
1925	Europe Zone, Semi-finals	12 Jul 1925	(Netherlands) Noordwijk	Clay	Netherlands	1–4	Lost
1926	Europe Zone, 1st Round	16 May 1926	(Czechoslovakia) Prague	—N/a	Czechoslovakia	1–4	Lost
1927	Europe Zone, 1st Round	11 Jun 1927	(Spain) Barcelona	Clay	Spain	3–2	Won
1927	Europe Zone, 2nd Round	22 May 1927	(Kingdom of Yugoslavia) Yugoslavia	—N/a	(Kingdom of Yugoslavia) Yugoslavia	3–0	Won
1927	Europe Zone, Quarter-finals	11 Jun 1927	(Denmark) Copenhagen	—N/a	Denmark	0–5	Lost
1928	Europe Zone 2nd Round	14 May 1928	(Switzerland) Zurich	—N/a	Switzerland	3–2	Won
1928	Europe Zone, Quarter-finals	11 Jun 1928	(Italy) Turin	Clay	Italy	1–4	Lost

=== 1930s ===
Year	Competition	Date	Location	Surface	Opponent	Score	Result
1930	Europe Zone, 1st Round	22 Apr 1930	(Greece) Athens	—N/a	Greece	3–2	Won
1930	Europe Zone, 2nd Round	17 May 1930	(United Kingdom) London	Clay	Japan	0–5	Lost
1932	Europe Zone, 1st Round	8 May 1932	(Germany) Berlin	—N/a	Germany	0–5	Lost
1933	Europe Zone, 1st Round	1 Apr 1933	—N/a	—N/a	Finland	w/o	Lost
1934	Europe Zone, 1st Round	20 May 1934	(Switzerland) Lucerne	—N/a	Switzerland	0–5	Lost
1938	Europe Zone, 2nd Round	1 May 1938	—N/a	—N/a	Austria	w/o	Won
1938	Europe Zone, Quarter-finals	28 May 1938	(Belgium) Brussels	—N/a	Belgium	1–3	Lost
1939	Europe Zone, 2nd Round	21 May 1939	(Belgium) Brussels	—N/a	Belgium	2–3	Lost

=== 1940s ===
Year	Competition	Date	Location	Surface	Opponent	Score	Result
1947	Europe Zone, 2nd Round	18 May 1947	(France) Paris	Clay	France	0–5	Lost
1948	Europe Zone, 1st Round	24 Apr 1948	(United Kingdom) London	Clay	(United Kingdom) Great Britain	2–3	Lost

=== 1950s ===
Year	Competition	Date	Location	Surface	Opponent	Score	Result
1952	Inter-Zonal, Semi-finals	13 Dec 1952	(Australia) Brisbane	Grass	Italy	2–3	Lost
1953	Inter-Zonal, Semi-finals	5 Dec 1953	(Australia) Perth	Grass	Belgium	0–5	Lost
1954	Europe Zone, 2nd Round	16 May 1954	(Austria) Vienna	—N/a	Austria	3–0	Won
1954	Europe Zone, Quarter-finals	13 Jun 1954	(France) Paris	Clay	France	1–4	Lost
1955	Europe Zone, 2nd Round	15 May 1955	(Egypt) Cairo	—N/a	Egypt	5–0	Won
1955	Europe Zone, Quarter-finals	13 Jun 1955	(United Kingdom) Manchester	Grass	(United Kingdom) Great Britain	2–3	Lost
1956	Eastern Zone, Semi-finals	24 Mar 1956	(Dominion of Ceylon) Colombo	Clay	(Dominion of Ceylon) Ceylon	5–0	Won
1956	Eastern Zone, Final	20 May 1956	(Japan) Tokyo	—N/a	Japan	3–2	Won
1956	Inter-Zonal, Final	16 Dec 1956	(Australia) Perth	Grass	United States	1–4	Lost
1957	Eastern Zone, Quarter-finals	3 Mar 1957	(India) Madras	—N/a	(Federation of Malaya) Malaya	5–0	Won
1957	Eastern Zone, Quarter-finals	28 Apr 1957	(Philippines) Manila	—N/a	Philippines	2–3	Lost
1958	Europe Zone, 1st Round	27 Apr 1958	Monaco	—N/a	Monaco	5–0	Won
1958	Europe Zone, 2nd Round	18 May 1958	(Italy) Florence	Clay	Italy	2–3	Lost
1959	Eastern Zone, Quarter-finals	1 Apr 1959	—N/a	—N/a	South Korea	w/o	Won
1959	Eastern Zone, Semi-finals	3 May 1959	(Japan) Tokyo	—N/a	Japan	3–2	Won
1959	Eastern Zone, Final	1 Jun 1959	(India) Calcutta	—N/a	Philippines	4–1	Won
1959	Inter-Zonal, Final	16 Aug 1959	(United States) Boston	Grass	Australia	1–4	Lost

=== 1960s ===
Year	Competition	Date	Location	Surface	Opponent	Score	Result
1960	Eastern Zone, Quarter-finals	6 Apr 1960	(Dominion of Ceylon) Colombo	Clay	(Dominion of Ceylon) Sri Lanka	5–0	Won
1960	Eastern Zone, Semi-finals	24 Apr 1960	(Thailand) Bangkok	—N/a	Thailand	5–0	Won
1960	Eastern Zone, Final	29 May 1960	(Philippines) Manila	—N/a	Philippines	0–3	Lost
1961	Eastern Zone, Quarter-finals	28 Mar 1961	(Indonesia) Bandung	—N/a	Indonesia	4–1	Won
1961	Eastern Zone, Semi-finals	3 Apr 1961	(India) Lucknow	—N/a	Thailand	5–0	Won
1961	Eastern Zone, Final	8 May 1961	(India) New Delhi	—N/a	Japan	4–1	Won
1961	Inter-Zonal, Semi-finals	2 Oct 1961	(India) New Delhi	—N/a	United States	2–3	Lost
1962	Eastern Zone, Quarter-finals	2 Apr 1962	(Pakistan) Lahore	—N/a	Pakistan	5–0	Won
1962	Eastern Zone, Semi-finals	16 Apr 1962	(India) Jaipur	—N/a	Iran	4–0	Won
1962	Eastern Zone, Final	6 May 1962	(India) New Delhi	—N/a	Philippines	5–0	Won
1962	Inter-Zonal, Final	5 Dec 1962	(India) Madras	—N/a	Mexico	0–5	Lost
1963	Eastern Zone, Quarter-finals	2 Apr 1963	(India) Poona	—N/a	Pakistan	4–1	Won
1963	Eastern Zone, Semi-finals	22 Apr 1963	(Federation of Malaya) Kuala Lumpur	—N/a	(Federation of Malaya) Malaysia	4–0	Won
1963	Eastern Zone, Final	7 May 1963	(Japan) Tokyo	—N/a	Japan	3–2	Won
1963	Inter-Zonal, Final	4 Nov 1963	(India) Bombay	—N/a	United States	0–5	Lost
1964	Eastern Zone, Quarter-finals	2 Mar 1964	(India) Hyderabad	—N/a	(Dominion of Ceylon) Ceylon	5–0	Won
1964	Eastern zone, Semi-finals	15 Mar 1964	(Pakistan) Lahore	—N/a	Pakistan	4–0	Won
1964	Eastern Zone, Final	19 Apr 1964	(South Vietnam) Saigon	—N/a	South Vietnam	5–0	Won
1964	Eastern Inter-Zonal, Final	26 Apr 1964	(Philippines) Manila	—N/a	Philippines	2–3	Lost
1965	Eastern Zone, Quarter-finals	21 Feb 1965	(Iran) Abadan	—N/a	Iran	5–0	Won
1965	Eastern Zone, Semi-finals	29 Mar 1965	(Dominion of Ceylon) Colombo	Clay	Sri Lanka	5–0	Won
1965	Eastern Zone, Final	12 Apr 1965	(India) Vijayawada	—N/a	South Vietnam	4–0	Won
1965	Eastern Inter-Zonal, Semi-finals	3 Oct 1965	(Japan) Tokyo	—N/a	Japan	4–1	Won
1965	Inter-Zonal, Final	7 Nov 1965	(Spain) Barcelona	Clay	Spain	2–3	Lost
1966	Eastern Zone, Semi-finals	21 Mar 1966	(India) Ahmedabad	—N/a	Iran	5–0	Won
1966	Eastern Zone, Final	9 May 1966	(India) Madras	—N/a	Sri Lanka	5–0	Won
1966	Eastern Zone, Final	3 Oct 1966	(Japan) Tokyo	—N/a	Japan	4–1	Won
1966	Inter-Zonal, Semi-finals	14 Nov 1966	(India) Calcutta	—N/a	West Germany	3–2	Won
1966	Inter-Zonal, Final	6 Dec 1966	(India) Calcutta	—N/a	Brazil	3–2	Won
1966	World Group, Challenge round	28 Dec 1966	(Australia) Melbourne	Grass	Australia	1–4	Runner-up
1967	Eastern Zone, Quarter finals	27 Feb 1967	(Dominion of Ceylon) Colombo	Clay	(Dominion of Ceylon) Sri Lanka	5–0	Won
1967	Eastern Zone, Semi-finals	30 Apr 1967	(Iran) Tehran	—N/a	Iran	4–1	Won
1967	Eastern Zone, Final	1 Oct 1967	(India) New Delhi	—N/a	Japan	4–1	Won
1967	Inter-Zonal, Semi-finals	12 Nov 1967	(Spain) Barcelona	Clay	South Africa	0–5	Lost
1968	Eastern Zone, Final	28 Apr 1968	(India) Guwahati	—N/a	(Dominion of Ceylon) Sri Lanka	3–2	Won
1968	Eastern Inter-Zone, Final	23 Sept 1968	(Japan) Tokyo	—N/a	Japan	4–1	Won
1968	Inter-Zonal, Semi-finals	6 Oct 1968	(Germany) Munich	—N/a	West Germany	3–2	Won
1968	Inter-Zonal, Final	11 Nov 1968	(Puerto Rico) San Juan	Hard	United States	1–4	Lost
1969	Eastern Zone, Semi-finals	3 Mar 1969	(Malaysia) Kuala Lumpur	—N/a	Malaysia	5–0	Won
1969	Eastern Zone, Final	27 Mar 1969	(Dominion of Ceylon) Colombo	Clay	(Dominion of Ceylon) Sri Lanka	4–1	Won
1969	Eastern Inter-Zonal, Final	12 May 1969	(India) Poona	—N/a	Japan	5–0	Won
1969	Inter-Zonal, Semi-finals	3 Aug 1969	(Romania) Bucharest	Clay	Romania	0–4	Lost

=== 1970s ===
Year	Competition	Date	Location	Surface	Opponent	Score	Result
1970	Eastern Zone B, Semi-finals	30 Mar 1970	(India) Patna	—N/a	Pakistan	3–1	Won
1970	Eastern Zone, Final	19 Apr 1970	(India) Bombay	—N/a	(Dominion of Ceylon) Ceylon	5–0	Won
1970	Inter-Zonal, Final	5 May 1970	(India) Bangalore	—N/a	Australia	3–1	Won
1970	Inter-Zonal, Semi-finals	3 Aug 1970	(India) Poona	—N/a	West Germany	0–5	Lost
1971	Eastern Zone B, Semi-finals	4 Apr 1971	(Dominion of Ceylon) Colombo	Clay	(Dominion of Ceylon) Ceylon	4–0	Won
1971	Eastern Zone, Final	1 May 1971	(Pakistan)	—N/a	Pakistan	w/o	Won
1971	Eastern Inter-Zonal, Final	17 May 1971	(Japan) Tokyo	—N/a	Japan	3–2	Won
1971	Inter-Zonal, Semi-finals	3 Aug 1971	(India) New Delhi	—N/a	Romania	1–4	Lost
1972	Eastern Zone B, Semi finals	3 Apr 1972	(India) Lucknow	—N/a	(Dominion of Ceylon) Ceylon	5–0	Won
1972	Eastern Zone, Final	30 Apr 1972	(Malaysia) Kuala Lumpur	—N/a	Malaysia	5–0	Won
1972	Eastern Inter-Zonal, Final	18 May 1972	(India) Bangalore	—N/a	Australia	0–5	Lost
1973	Eastern zone, Semi-finals	22 Apr 1973	(Malaysia) Kuala Lumpur	Grass	Pakistan	4–0	Won
1973	Eastern Zone, Final	6 May 1973	(India) Madras	—N/a	Australia	0–4	Lost
1974	Eastern Zone, Semi-finals	5 May 1974	(India) Kanpur	—N/a	Japan	4–1	Won
1974	Eastern Zone, Final	12 May 1974	(India) Calcutta	—N/a	Australia	3–2	Won
1974	Inter-Zonal, Final	22 Sep 1974	(India) Pune	—N/a	Soviet Union	3–1	Won
1974	World Group, Final	1 Dec 1974	(South Africa)	—N/a	South Africa	w/o (Note: India boycotted Davis Cup final owing to the South African government's apartheid policies.)	Runner-up
1975	Eastern Zone, Semi-finals	19 Jan 1975	(India) Lucknow	—N/a	New Zealand	1–3	Lost
1976	Eastern Zone, 1st Round	28 Sep 1975	(India) Amritsar	—N/a	Thailand	5–0	Won
1976	Eastern Zone, Qualifying Round	1 Oct 1975	(Japan) Tokyo	—N/a	Japan	3–2	Won
1976	Eastern Zone, Quarter-finals	21 Dec 1975	(Philippines) Manila	—N/a	Philippines	4–0	Won
1976	Eastern Zone, Semi-finals	18 Jan 1976	(New Zealand) Auckland	Grass	New Zealand	2–3	Lost
1977	Eastern Zone, Quarter-finals	4 Dec 1976	(India) New Delhi	—N/a	Japan	3–2	Won
1977	Eastern Zone, Semi-finals	23 Jan 1977	(Australia) Perth	Grass	Australia	0–5	Lost
1978	Eastern Zone, Quarter-finals	12 Dec 1977	(India) Coimbatore	—N/a	South Korea	4–1	Won
1978	Eastern Zone, Semi-finals	21 Jan 1978	(India) New Delhi	—N/a	New Zealand	1–4	Lost
1979	Eastern Zone, Quarter-finals	7 Dec 1978	(India) Ahmedabad	—N/a	Indonesia	4–1	Won
1979	Eastern Zone, Semi-finals	12 Feb 1979	(India) Madras	Clay	Australia	2–3	Lost

=== 1980s ===
Year	Competition	Date	Location	Surface	Opponent	Score	Result
1980	Eastern Zone, Quarter-finals	9 Dec 1979	(South Korea) Seoul	—N/a	South Korea	2–3	Lost
1981	Eastern Zone, Semi-finals	15 Feb 1981	(Thailand) Bangkok	Hard	Thailand	5–0	Won
1981	Eastern Zone, Final	8 Mar 1981	(Indonesia) Jakarta	Clay	Indonesia	3–2	Won
1982	World Group, 1st Round	7 Mar 1982	(United States) Carlsbad	Hard	United States	1–4	Lost
1982	World group, Relegation play-offs	3 Oct 1982	(Soviet Union) Donetsk	Clay	Soviet Union	1–4	Lost
1983	Eastern Zone, Quarter-finals	6 Mar 1983	(Sri Lanka) Colombo	Clay	Sri Lanka	4–1	Won
1983	Eastern Zone, Semi-finals	8 May 1983	(India) New Delhi	Grass	Thailand	5–0	Won
1983	Eastern Zone, Final	2 Oct 1983	(Japan) Tokyo	Hard	Japan	3–2	Won
1984	World Cup, 1st Round	26 Feb 1984	(India) New Delhi	Grass	France	1–4	Lost
1984	World Group, Relegation play-offs	30 Sep 1984	(Denmark) Aarhus	Clay	Denmark	3–2	Won
1985	World Group, 1st Round	10 Mar 1985	(India) Calcutta	Grass	Italy	3–2	Won
1985	World Group, Quarter-finals	4 Aug 1985	(India) Bangalore	Grass	Sweden	1–4	Lost
1986	World Cup, 1st Round	9 Mar 1986	(India) Calcutta	Grass	Czechoslovakia	1–4	Lost
1986	World Group, Relegation play-offs	5 Oct 1986	(India) New Delhi	Grass	Soviet Union	4–1	Won
1987	World Group, 1st Round	15 Mar 1987	(India) New Delhi	Grass	Argentina	3–2	Won
1987	World Group, Quarter-finals	26 Jul 1987	(India) New Delhi	Grass	Israel	4–0	Won
1987	World Group, Semi-finals	4 Oct 1987	(Australia) Sydney	Grass	Australia	3–2	Won
1987	World Group, Final	20 Dec 1987	(Sweden) Gothenburg	Clay(i)	Sweden	0–5	Runner-up
1988	World Group, 1st Round	7 Feb 1988	(India) New Delhi	Grass	(Socialist Federal Republic of Yugoslavia) Yugoslavia	2–3	Lost
1988	World Group, Relegation play-offs	9 Apr 1988	(Israel)	—N/a	Israel	w/o	Lost
1989	Asia/Oceania Zone, 2nd Round	7 May 1989	(India) Bharuch	Grass	South Korea	1–4	Lost

=== 1990s ===
Year	Competition	Date	Location	Surface	Opponent	Score	Result
1990	Asia/Oceania Group I, 1st Round	1 Apr 1990	(India) Chandigarh	Grass	Japan	4–1	Won
1990	Asia/Oceania Group I, 2nd Round	6 May 1990	(South Korea) Seoul	Clay	South Korea	0–5	Lost
1991	Asia/Oceania Group I, Preliminary Round	10 Feb 1991	(Thailand) Bangkok	Hard	Thailand	5–0	Won
1991	Asia/Oceania Group I, 1st Round	31 Mar 1991	(India) Jaipur	Grass	Indonesia	4–1	Won
1991	Asia/Oceania Group I, 2nd Round	5 May 1991	(India) New Delhi	Grass	South Korea	3–2	Won
1991	World Group, qualifying round	22 Sep 1991	(Brazil) São Paulo	Clay	Brazil	1–4	Lost
1992	Asia/Oceania Group I, 2nd Round	3 May 1992	(Indonesia) Jakarta	Clay	Indonesia	5–0	Won
1992	World Group, qualifying round	27 Sep 1992	(India) New Delhi	Grass	(United Kingdom) Great Britain	4–1	Won
1993	World Group, 1st Round	28 Mar 1993	(India) Calcutta	Grass	Switzerland	3–2	Won
1993	World Group, Quarter-finals	19 Jul 1993	(France) Frejus	Clay	France	3–2	Won
1993	World Group, Semi-finals	26 Sep 1993	(India) Chandigarh	Grass	Australia	0–5	Lost
1994	World Group, 1st Round	27 Mar 1994	(India) New Delhi	Grass	United States	0–5	Lost
1994	World Group, qualifying round	25 Sep 1994	(India) Jaipur	Grass	South Africa	2–3	Lost
1995	Asia/Oceania Group I, 1st Round	5 Feb 1995	(India) Calcutta	Grass	Hong Kong	4–1	Won
1995	Asia/Oceania Group I, 2nd Round	2 Apr 1995	(India) New Delhi	Grass	Philippines	5–0	Won
1995	World Group, qualifying round	24 Sep 1995	(India) New Delhi	Grass	Croatia	3–2	Won
1996	World Group, 1st Round	11 Feb 1996	(India) Jaipur	Grass	Netherlands	3–2	Won
1996	World Group, Quarter-finals	7 Apr 1996	(India) Calcutta	Grass	Sweden	0–5	Lost
1997	World Group, 1st Round	9 Feb 1997	(Czech Republic) Příbram	Clay(i)	Czech Republic	2–3	Lost
1997	World Group, qualifying round	21 Sep 1997	(India) New Delhi	Grass	Chile	3–2	Won
1998	World Group, 1st Round	5 Apr 1998	(Italy) Genoa	Clay	Italy	1–4	Lost
1998	World Group, qualifying round	27 Sep 1998	(United Kingdom) Nottingham	Hard	(United Kingdom) Great Britain	2–3	Lost
1999	Asia/Oceania Group I, 1st Round	21 Feb 1999	(South Korea) Seogwipo	Hard	South Korea	2–3	Lost
1999	Asia/Oceania Group I, 1st Round Relegation Play-offs	4 Apr 1999	(India) Calcutta	Grass	China	5–0	Won

=== 2000s ===
Year	Competition	Date	Location	Surface	Opponent	Score	Result
2000	Asia/Oceania Group I, 1st Round	6 Feb 2000	(India) Lucknow	Grass	Lebanon	3–2	Won
2000	Asia/Oceania Group I, 2nd Round	9 Apr 2000	(India) New Delhi	Grass	South Korea	4–1	Won
2000	World Group, qualifying round	23 Jul 2000	(Sweden) Båstad	Clay	Sweden	0–5	Lost
2001	Asia/Oceania Group I, 1st Round	11 Feb 2001	(China) Hebei	Hard(i)	China	3–2	Won
2001	Asia/Oceania Group I, 2nd Round	7 Apr 2001	(Japan) Tokyo	Hard(i)	Japan	3–2	Won
2001	World Group, qualifying round	14 Oct 2001	(United States) Winston-Salem	Hard(i)	United States	1–4	Lost
2002	Asia/Oceania Group I, 1st Round	10 Feb 2002	(Lebanon) Beirut	Hard(i)	Lebanon	5–0	Won
2002	Asia/Oceania Group I, 2nd Round	7 Apr 2002	(New Zealand) Wellington	Hard	New Zealand	4–1	Won
2002	World Group, qualifying round	22 Sep 2002	(Australia) Adelaide	Hard	Australia	0–5	Lost
2003	Asia/Oceania Group I, 1st Round	9 Feb 2003	(India) New Delhi	Grass	Japan	4–1	Won
2003	Asia/Oceania Group I, 2nd Round	6 Apr 2003	(India) Kolkata	Grass	New Zealand	4–1	Won
2003	World Group, play-offs	21 Sep 2003	(Netherlands) Zwolle	Hard(i)	Netherlands	0–5	Lost
2004	Asia/Oceania Group I, 1st Round	8 Feb 2004	(New Zealand) Invercargill	Carpet(i)	New Zealand	3–2	Won
2004	Asia/Oceania Group I, 2nd Round	11 Apr 2004	(Japan) Osaka	Hard	Japan	2–3	Lost
2005	Asia/Oceania Group I, 1st Round	6 Mar 2005	(India) New Delhi	Grass	China	5–0	Won
2005	Asia/Oceania Group I, 2nd Round	1 May 2005	(India) Jaipur	Grass	Uzbekistan	5–0	Won
2005	World Group, play-offs	26 Sep 2005	(India) New Delhi	Grass	Sweden	1–3	Lost
2006	Asia/Oceania Group I, 1st Round	12 Feb 2006	(South Korea) Changwon	Hard	South Korea	1–4	Lost
2006	Asia/Oceania Group I, 1st Rd Play-offs	9 Apr 2006	(India) Mumbai	Grass	Pakistan	3–2	Won
2007	Asia/Oceania Group I, 1st Round	11 Feb 2007	(Uzbekistan) Namangan	Clay	Uzbekistan	1–4	Lost
2007	Asia/Oceania Group I, 1st Rd Play-offs	8 Apr 2007	(Kazakhstan) Almaty	Hard(i)	Kazakhstan	3–2	Won
2008	Asia/Oceania Group I, 1st Round	10 Feb 2008	(India) New Delhi	Grass	Uzbekistan	3–2	Won
2008	Asia/Oceania Group I, 2nd Round	13 Apr 2008	(India) New Delhi	Grass	Japan	3–2	Won
2008	World Group, play-offs	21 Sep 2008	(Romania) Bucharest	Clay	Romania	1–4	Lost
2009	Asia/Oceania Group I, 1st Round	8 Mar 2009	(Chinese Taipei) Kaohsiung	Hard	Chinese Taipei	3–2	Won
2009	Asia/Oceania Group I, 2nd Round	10 May 2009	(India) Chennai	Hard	Australia	w/o	Won
2009	World Group, play-offs	20 Sep 2009	(South Africa) Johannesburg	Hard(i)	South Africa	4–1	Won

=== 2010s ===
Year	Competition	Date	Location	Surface	Opponent	Score	Result
2010	World Group, 1st Round	7 Mar 2010	(Russia) Moscow	Hard(i)	Russia	2–3	Lost
2010	World Group, play-offs	19 Sep 2010	(India) Chennai	Hard	Brazil	3–2	Won
2011	World Group, 1st Round	6 Mar 2011	(Serbia) Novi Sad	Hard(i)	Serbia	1–4	Lost
2011	World Group, play-offs	18 Sep 2011	(Japan) Tokyo	Hard	Japan	1–4	Lost
2012	Asia/Oceania Group I, 2nd Round	8 Apr 2012	(Uzbekistan) Namangan	Clay	Uzbekistan	2–3	Lost
2012	Asia/Oceania Group I, 1st Rd Play-offs	16 Sep 2012	(India) Chandigarh	Hard	New Zealand	5–0	Won
2013	Asia/Oceania Group I, 1st Round	3 Feb 2013	(India) New Delhi	Hard	South Korea	1–4	Lost
2013	Asia/Oceania Group I, 1st Rd Play-offs	7 Apr 2013	(India) Bangalore	Hard	Indonesia	5–0	Won
2014	Asia/Oceania Group I, 1st Round	2 Feb 2014	(India) Indore	Hard	Chinese Taipei	5–0	Won
2014	Asia/Oceania Group I, 2nd Round	6 Apr 2014	(South Korea) Busan	Hard	South Korea	3–1	Won
2014	World Group, play-offs	14 Sep 2014	(India) Bangalore	Hard	Serbia	2–3	Lost
2015	Asia/Oceania Group I, 2nd Round	19 Jul 2015	(New Zealand) Christchurch	Hard(i)	New Zealand	3–2	Won
2015	World Group, play-offs	20 Sep 2015	(India) New Delhi	Hard	Czech Republic	1–3	Lost
2016	Asia/Oceania Group I, 2nd Round	17 Jul 2016	(India) Chandigarh	Grass	South Korea	4–1	Won
2016	World Group, play-offs	18 Sep 2016	(India) New Delhi	Hard	Spain	0–5	Lost
2017	Asia/Oceania Group I, 1st Round	5 Feb 2017	(India) Pune	Hard	New Zealand	4–1	Won
2017	Asia/Oceania Group I, 2nd Round	9 Apr 2017	(India) Bangalore	Hard	Uzbekistan	4–1	Won
2017	World Group, play-offs	17 Sep 2017	(Canada) Edmonton	Hard(i)	Canada	2–3	Lost
2018	Asia/Oceania Group I, 2nd Round	7 Apr 2018	(China) Tianjin	Hard	China	3–2	Won
2018	World Group, play-offs	16 Sep 2018	(Serbia) Kraljevo	Clay(i)	Serbia	0–4	Lost
2019	World Group, qualifying round	2 Feb 2019	(India) Kolkata	Grass	Italy	1–3	Lost
2019	Asia/Oceania Group I	30 Nov 2019	(Kazakhstan) Nur-Sultan (Note: The Davis Cup tie was postponed from 14-15 September to 29-30 November and shifted out of Pakistan to a neutral venue due to the security concerns raised by India.)	Hard(i)	Pakistan	4–0	Won

=== 2020s ===
Year	Competition	Date	Location	Surface	Opponent	Score	Result
2020–21	Finals, qualifying round	7 Mar 2020	(Croatia) Zagreb	Hard(i)	Croatia	1–3	Lost
2020–21	World Group I	18 Sep 2021	(Finland) Espoo	Hard(i)	Finland	1–3	Lost
2022	World Group I, Play-offs	5 Mar 2022	(India) New Delhi	Grass	Denmark	4–0	Won
2022	World Group I	17 Sep 2022	(Norway) Lillehammer	Hard(i)	Norway	1–3	Lost
2023	World Group I, Play-offs	4 February 2023	(Denmark) Hillerod	Hard(i)	Denmark	2–3	Lost
2023	World Group II	17 September 2023	(India) Lucknow	Hard	Morocco	4–1	Won
2024	World Group I, Play-offs	4 Feb 2024	(Pakistan) Islamabad	Grass	Pakistan	4–0	Won
2024	World Group I	15 Sep 2024	(Sweden) Stockholm	Hard(i)	Sweden	0–4	Lost
2025	World Group I, Play-offs	2 Feb 2025	(India) New Delhi	Hard	Togo	4–0	Won
2025	World Group I	14 Sep 2025	(Switzerland) Biel/Bienne	Hard(i)	Switzerland	3–1	Won
2026	Qualifiers first round	8 Feb 2026	(India) Bengaluru	Hard	Netherlands	3–2	Won
2026	Qualifiers second round	18–20 Sep 2026	(South Korea) Seoul	Hard	South Korea	1–3	Lost

== See also ==
- Davis Cup
- India Billie Jean King Cup team
- India at the Hopman Cup
