= 2012 Davis Cup Asia/Oceania Zone Group I =

International tennis competition

The Asia/Oceania Zone is one of the three zones of regional Davis Cup competition in 2012.

In the Asia/Oceania Zone there are four different groups in which teams compete against each other to advance to the next group.

== Participating nations ==
Seeds:

1. India (second round)
2. Australia

Remaining Nations:

- China
- Chinese Taipei
- South Korea
- New Zealand
- Uzbekistan

== Draw ==
Second round play-offs
Kaohsiung City, Taiwan (hard)
New Zealand	2
Chinese Taipei	3

First round play-offs
Chandigarh, India (hard)
1	India	5
New Zealand	0
Kaohsiung City, Taiwan (hard)
Chinese Taipei	2
China	3

First round
1	India
Bye
Tauranga, New Zealand (hard indoor)
New Zealand	2
Uzbekistan	3
Gimcheon, South Korea (hard indoor)
South Korea	4
Chinese Taipei	1
Geelong, Australia (grass)
China	0
2	Australia	5

Second round
Namangan, Uzbekistan (clay indoor)
1	India	2
Uzbekistan	3
Brisbane, Australia (hard)
South Korea	0
2	Australia	5

- New Zealand relegated to Group II in 2013.
- Uzbekistan and Australia advance to World Group play-offs.

== First round ==
=== New Zealand vs. Uzbekistan ===
New Zealand
2
TECT Arena, Tauranga, New Zealand
10–12 February 2012
Hard (indoor)

Uzbekistan
3

			1	2	3	4	5
1	(New Zealand) (Uzbekistan)	Jose Statham; Denis Istomin	1; 6	1; 6	3; 6
2	(New Zealand) (Uzbekistan)	Michael Venus; Farrukh Dustov	6; 3	1; 6	2; 6	2; 6
3	(New Zealand) (Uzbekistan)	Daniel King-Turner / Michael Venus; Farrukh Dustov / Denis Istomin	4; 6	6^{4} 7^{7}	1; 6
4	(New Zealand) (Uzbekistan)	Artem Sitak; Murad Inoyatov	6; 2	3; 6	6; 3
5	(New Zealand) (Uzbekistan)	Daniel King-Turner; Sarvar Ikramov	4; 6	6; 4	6; 3

=== South Korea vs. Chinese Taipei ===
South Korea
4
Gimcheon Total Sports Town Tennis Courts, Gimcheon, South Korea
10–12 February 2012
Hard (indoor)

Chinese Taipei
1

			1	2	3	4	5
1	(South Korea) (Chinese Taipei)	Lim Yong-kyu; Chen Ti	5; 7	3; 6	6; 1	7; 5	6; 4
2	(South Korea) (Chinese Taipei)	Jeong Suk-young; Yang Tsung-hua	6; 4	4; 6	6; 3	7^{7} 6^{5}
3	(South Korea) (Chinese Taipei)	Jeong Suk-young / Lim Yong-kyu; Huang Liang-chi / Yi Chu-huan	6; 4	6; 3	6^{4} 7^{7}	3; 6	7; 5
4	(South Korea) (Chinese Taipei)	Cho Min Hyeok; Yang Tsung-hua	6; 2	7; 5
5	(South Korea) (Chinese Taipei)	Seol Jae-Min; Huang Liang-chi	6^{4} 7^{7}	3; 6

=== Australia vs. China ===
Australia
5
Geelong Lawn Tennis Club, Geelong, Australia
10–12 February 2012
Grass

China
0

			1	2	3	4	5
1	(Australia) (China)	Lleyton Hewitt; Zhang Ze	6; 2	6; 1	7^{7} 6^{4}
2	(Australia) (China)	Bernard Tomic; Wu Di	6; 4	7^{7} 6^{3}	6; 3
3	(Australia) (China)	Chris Guccione / Lleyton Hewitt; Li Zhe / Zhang Ze	6; 2	6; 2	6; 2
4	(Australia) (China)	Matthew Ebden; Ma Yanan	6; 2	6; 2
5	(Australia) (China)	Chris Guccione; Wu Di	6; 2	6; 4

== Second round ==
=== Uzbekistan vs. India ===
Uzbekistan
3
Sport Complex Pahlavon, Namangan, Uzbekistan
6–8 April 2012
Clay (indoor)

India
2

			1	2	3	4	5
1	(Uzbekistan) (India)	Denis Istomin; Sanam Singh	6; 3	6; 2	6; 4
2	(Uzbekistan) (India)	Farrukh Dustov; Yuki Bhambri	6; 4	6; 4	6; 3
3	(Uzbekistan) (India)	Murad Inoyatov / Denis Istomin; Rohan Bopanna / Leander Paes	7^{7} 6^{4}	6; 4	3; 6	6; 3
4	(Uzbekistan) (India)	Denis Istomin; Yuki Bhambri	7^{7} 6^{1}	6^{3} 7^{7}	6^{3} 7^{7}
5	(Uzbekistan) (India)	Sarvar Ikramov; Rohan Bopanna	2; 6	7^{7} 6^{0}	1; 6

=== Australia vs. South Korea ===
Australia
5
Queensland Tennis Centre, Brisbane, Australia
6–8 April 2012
Hard

South Korea
0

			1	2	3	4	5
1	(Australia) (South Korea)	Bernard Tomic; Cho Min Hyeok	7; 5	6; 3	6; 3
2	(Australia) (South Korea)	Matthew Ebden; Jeong Suk-young	6; 3	6; 3	6; 4
3	(Australia) (South Korea)	Chris Guccione / Marinko Matosevic; Jeong Suk-young / Seol Jae-Min	4; 6	6; 1	6; 4	6; 2
4	(Australia) (South Korea)	Bernard Tomic; Na Jung-woong	6; 2	6; 1
5	(Australia) (South Korea)	Matthew Ebden; Cho Min Hyeok	6; 2	2; 6	6; 0

== First round play-off ==
=== Chinese Taipei vs. China ===
Chinese Taipei
2
Kaohsiung Yangming Tennis Courts, Kaohsiung, Taiwan
6–8 April 2012
Hard

China
3

			1	2	3	4	5
1	(Chinese Taipei) (China)	Yang Tsung-hua; Wu Di	4; 6	6; 2	6^{0} 7^{7}	6; 3	6; 8
2	(Chinese Taipei) (China)	Wang Yeu-tzuoo; Zhang Ze	6; 3	6; 4	3; 6	6; 2
3	(Chinese Taipei) (China)	Hsieh Cheng-peng / Lee Hsin-han; Li Zhe / Zhang Ze	6^{4} 7^{7}	6^{4} 7^{7}	3; 6
4	(Chinese Taipei) (China)	Yang Tsung-hua; Zhang Ze	6; 3	6; 3	3; 6	7; 5
5	(Chinese Taipei) (China)	Wang Yeu-tzuoo; Wu Di	4; 6	6^{4} 7^{7}	6^{4} 7^{7}

=== India vs. New Zealand ===
India
5
CLTA Tennis Stadium, Chandigarh, India
14–16 September 2012
Hard

New Zealand
0

			1	2	3	4	5
1	(India) (New Zealand)	Yuki Bhambri; Daniel King-Turner	6; 3	6; 0	2; 6	4; 6	2; 6
2	(India) (New Zealand)	Vishnu Vardhan; Jose Statham	2; 6	7^{7} 6^{2}	4; 6	2; 6
3	(India) (New Zealand)	Vishnu Vardhan / Divij Sharan; Michael Venus / Daniel King-Turner	6; 7	6; 4	3; 6	7; 6	3; 6
4	(India) (New Zealand)	Yuki Bhambri; Jose Statham	6; 2	5; 7	6^{5} 7^{7}
5	(India) (New Zealand)	Sanam Singh; Artem Sitak	4; 6	1; 6

== Second round play-off ==
=== Chinese Taipei vs. New Zealand ===
Chinese Taipei
3
Kaohsiung Yangming Tennis Courts, Kaohsiung, Taiwan
6–8 April 2012
Hard

New Zealand
2

			1	2	3	4	5
1	(Chinese Taipei) (New Zealand)	Yang Tsung-hua; Daniel King-Turner	4; 6	6; 0	6; 3	7^{7} 6^{2}
2	(Chinese Taipei) (New Zealand)	Huang Liang-chi; Michael Venus	6; 4	7^{7} 6^{0}	6; 3
3	(Chinese Taipei) (New Zealand)	Hsieh Cheng-peng / Huang Liang-chi; Daniel King-Turner / Artem Sitak	6; 3	6^{4} 7^{7}	1; 6	4; 6
4	(Chinese Taipei) (New Zealand)	Huang Liang-chi; Daniel King-Turner	6; 3	7^{7} 6^{3}	6; 1
5	(Chinese Taipei) (New Zealand)	Yang Tsung-hua; Artem Sitak	1; 6	6^{3} 7^{7}
