= 1998 Davis Cup =

1998 edition of the Davis Cup

Details
- Duration: 3 April – 6 December 1998
- Edition: 87th
- Teams: 131

Champion
- Winning nation: Sweden

The 1998 Davis Cup (also known as the 1998 Davis Cup by NEC for sponsorship purposes) was the 87th edition of the Davis Cup, the most important tournament between national teams in men's tennis. 131 teams entered the competition, 16 in the World Group, 30 in the Americas Zone, 30 in the Asia/Oceania Zone, and 55 in the Europe/Africa Zone. Honduras, Iraq, the Netherlands Antilles, Saint Lucia and the U.S. Virgin Islands made their first appearances in the tournament.

Sweden defeated Italy in the final, held at the Forum di Assago in Milan, Italy, on 4–6 December, to win their second consecutive title and their 7th title overall.

== World Group ==
Participating teams
Australia	Belgium	Brazil	Czech Republic
Germany	India	Italy	Netherlands
Russia	Slovakia	South Africa	Spain
Sweden	Switzerland	United States	Zimbabwe

=== Draw ===
First round 3–6 April
Bratislava, Slovakia (indoor clay)
Sweden	3
Slovakia	2
Bremen, Germany (indoor carpet)
Germany	5
South Africa	0
Porto Alegre, Brazil (clay)
Spain	3
Brazil	2
Zürich, Switzerland (indoor carpet)
Czech Republic	2
Switzerland	3
Genoa, Italy (clay)
India	1
Italy	4
Mildura, Australia (grass)
Zimbabwe	3
Australia	2
Brussels, Belgium (clay)
Belgium	3
Netherlands	1
Atlanta, GA, United States (hard)
Russia	2
United States	3

Quarterfinals; 17–19 July
Hamburg, Germany (hard)
Sweden	3
Germany	2
A Coruña, Spain (clay)
Spain	4
Switzerland	1
Prato, Italy (clay)
Italy	5
Zimbabwe	0
Indianapolis, IN, United States (hard)
Belgium	1
United States	4

Semifinals; 25–27 September
Stockholm, Sweden (indoor carpet)
Sweden	4
Spain	1
Milwaukee, WI, United States (indoor hard)
Italy	4
United States	1

Final; 4–6 December
Milan, Italy (indoor clay)
Sweden	4
Italy	1

=== Final ===
Italy vs. Sweden

Italy
1
Forum di Assago, Milan, Italy
4–6 December 1998
Clay (indoors)

Sweden
4

			1	2	3	4	5
1	(Italy) (Sweden)	Andrea Gaudenzi; Magnus Norman	7^{11} 6^{9}	6^{0} 7^{7}	6; 4	3; 6	6; 6	retired
2	(Italy) (Sweden)	Davide Sanguinetti; Magnus Gustafsson	1; 6	4; 6	0; 6
3	(Italy) (Sweden)	Diego Nargiso / Davide Sanguinetti; Jonas Björkman / Nicklas Kulti	6^{1} 7^{7}	1; 6	3; 6
4	(Italy) (Sweden)	Gianluca Pozzi; Magnus Gustafsson	4; 6	2; 6
5	(Italy) (Sweden)	Diego Nargiso; Magnus Norman	6; 2	6; 3

== World Group qualifying round ==
Date: 25–28 September

The eight losing teams in the World Group first round ties and eight winners of the Zonal Group I final round ties competed in the World Group qualifying round for spots in the 1999 World Group.

Home team	Score	Visiting team	Location	Venue	Door	Surface
Australia	5–0	Uzbekistan	Townsville	Townsville Entertainment and Convention Centre	Indoor	Hard
Brazil	3–0	Romania	Florianópolis	Hotel Costão do Santinho	Outdoor	Clay
Czech Republic	5–0	South Africa	Prague	National Tennis Centre	Outdoor	Clay
Israel	1–4	France	Ramat HaSharon	Canada Stadium	Outdoor	Hard
Great Britain	3–2	India	Nottingham	Nottingham Tennis Centre	Outdoor	Hard
Netherlands	5–0	Ecuador	Eindhoven	Indoor-Sportcentrum Eindhoven	Indoor	Carpet
Japan	1–3	Russia	Osaka	Utsubo Tennis Center	Outdoor	Hard
Argentina	2–3	Slovakia	Buenos Aires	Buenos Aires Lawn Tennis Club	Outdoor	Clay

- Australia, Brazil, Czech Republic, Netherlands, Russia and Slovakia remain in the World Group in 1999.
- France and Great Britain are promoted to the World Group in 1999.
- Argentina, Ecuador, Israel, Japan, Romania and Uzbekistan remain in Zonal Group I in 1999.
- India and South Africa are relegated to Zonal Group I in 1999.

== Americas Zone ==
=== Group I ===
Second Round Play-offs
Cali, Colombia (clay)
Colombia	3
Mexico	2

First Round Play-offs
Santiago, Chile (indoor carpet)
Chile	5
Colombia	0
Zapopan, Mexico (clay)
Bahamas	3
Mexico	2

First Round
Chile
bye
Buenos Aires, Argentina (clay)
Colombia	0
Argentina	5
Nassau, Bahamas (hard)
Ecuador	5
Bahamas	0
Halifax, Canada (indoor hard)
Canada	3
Mexico	2

Second Round
Buenos Aires, Argentina (clay)
Chile	1
Argentina	4
Guayaquil, Ecuador (clay)
Ecuador	3
Canada	2

- Mexico relegated to Group II in 1999.
- Argentina and Ecuador advance to World Group qualifying round.

=== Group II ===
Relegation Play-offs
Havana, Cuba (hard)
Guatemala	2
Cuba	3
Asunción, Paraguay (clay)
Jamaica	0
Paraguay	5

First Round
Caracas, Venezuela (hard)
Venezuela	4
Guatemala	1
Port-au-Prince, Haiti (hard)
Haiti	3
Cuba	2
Lima, Peru (clay)
Jamaica	0
Peru	5
Montevideo, Uruguay (clay)
Paraguay	2
Uruguay	3

Second Round
Port-au-Prince, Haiti (clay)
Venezuela	3
Haiti	2
Montevideo, Uruguay (clay)
Peru	1
Uruguay	4

Third Round
Montevideo, Uruguay (clay)
Venezuela	3
Uruguay	2

- Guatemala and Jamaica relegated to Group III in 1999.
- Venezuela promoted to Group I in 1999.

=== Group III ===
- Venue: Santa Cruz Tennis Club, Santa Cruz de la Sierra, Bolivia
- Date: 29 April–3 May

Rank	Team
1	Dominican Republic
2	Costa Rica
3	El Salvador
4	Bolivia
5	Panama
6	Antigua and Barbuda
7	Puerto Rico
8	Bermuda

- Dominican Republic and Costa Rica promoted to Group II in 1999.
- Puerto Rico and Bermuda relegated to Group IV in 1999.

=== Group IV ===
- Venue: St. Lucia Racquet Club, Gros Islet, Saint Lucia
- Date: 23–29 March

	AHO	HON	LCA	TRI	BAR	ISV	ECA	RR; W–L	Match; W–L	Set; W–L	Standings
Netherlands Antilles		2–1	2–1	3–0	3–0	3–0	3–0	6–0	16–2 (89%)	33–5 (87%)	1
Honduras	1–2		2–1	2–1	2–1	2–1	2–1	5–1	11–7 (61%)	24–16 (60%)	2
Saint Lucia	1–2	1–2		1–2	2–1	3–0	2–1	3–3	10–8 (56%)	22–17 (56%)	3
Trinidad and Tobago	0–3	1–2	2–1		2–1	0–3	3–0	3–3	8–10 (44%)	17–21 (45%)	4
Barbados	0–3	1–2	1–2	1–2		2–1	2–1	2–4	7–11 (39%)	17–26 (40%)	5
U.S. Virgin Islands	0–3	1–2	0–3	3–0	1–2		2–1	2–4	7–11 (39%)	16–22 (42%)	6
Eastern Caribbean	0–3	1–2	1–2	0–3	1–2	1–2		0–6	4–14 (22%)	9–31 (23%)	7

- Netherlands Antilles and Honduras promoted to Group III in 1999.

== Asia/Oceania Zone ==
=== Group I ===
Second Round Play-offs
Yanji, China (hard)
China	5
Indonesia	0

First Round Play-offs
Seoul, South Korea (hard)
South Korea	4
China	1
Zouk Mikael, Lebanon (indoor hard)
Indonesia	2
Lebanon	3

First Round
South Korea
bye
Tashkent, Uzbekistan (indoor hard)
Uzbekistan	5
China	0
Sapporo, Japan (indoor carpet)
Indonesia	0
Japan	5
Beirut, Lebanon (indoor hard)
Lebanon	2
New Zealand	3

Second Round
Seoul, South Korea (clay)
South Korea	1
Uzbekistan	3
Miyazaki, Japan (clay)
Japan	3
New Zealand	2

- Indonesia relegated to Group II in 1999.
- Uzbekistan and Japan advance to World Group qualifying round.

=== Group II ===
Relegation Play-offs
Causeway Bay, Hong Kong (hard)
Philippines	4
Hong Kong	1
Doha, Qatar (hard)
Pacific Oceania	1
Qatar	4

First Round
Manila, Philippines (indoor clay)
Philippines	1
Thailand	4
Yilan, Taiwan (indoor carpet)
Hong Kong	2
Chinese Taipei	3
Islamabad, Pakistan (clay)
Pakistan	5
Pacific Oceania	0
Tehran, Iran (indoor clay)
Qatar	0
Iran	5

Second Round
Pattaya, Thailand (hard)
Thailand	3
Chinese Taipei	2
Tehran, Iran (clay)
Pakistan	4
Iran	1

Third Round
Lahore, Pakistan (grass)
Thailand	2
Pakistan	3

- Hong Kong and Pacific Oceania relegated to Group III in 1999.
- Pakistan promoted to Group I in 1999.

=== Group III ===
- Venue: National Centre, Kuala Lumpur, Malaysia
- Date: 15–19 April

Rank	Team
1	Kazakhstan
2	Sri Lanka
3	Tajikistan
4	Malaysia
5	Syria
6	Saudi Arabia
7	Singapore
8	Kuwait

- Kazakhstan and Sri Lanka promoted to Group II in 1999.
- Singapore and Kuwait relegated to Group IV in 1999.

=== Group IV ===
- Venue: National Complex, Ramna Park, Dhaka, Bangladesh
- Date: 9–15 February

	BHR	BAN	IRQ	JOR	OMA	UAE	BRU	RR; W–L	Match; W–L	Set; W–L	Standings
Bahrain		2–1	2–1	2–1	3–0	3–0	3–0	6–0	15–3 (83%)	32–9 (78%)	1
Bangladesh	1–2		3–0	2–1	2–1	3–0	3–0	5–1	14–4 (78%)	31–13 (70%)	2
Iraq	1–2	0–3		3–0	2–1	3–0	3–0	4–2	12–6 (67%)	26–14 (65%)	3
Jordan	1–2	1–2	0–3		2–1	3–0	3–0	3–3	10–8 (56%)	22–17 (56%)	4
Oman	0–3	1–2	1–2	1–2		2–1	2–1	2–4	7–11 (39%)	14–24 (37%)	5
United Arab Emirates	0–3	0–3	0–3	0–3	1–2		2–1	1–5	3–15 (17%)	8–29 (22%)	6
Brunei	0–3	0–3	0–3	0–3	1–2	1–2		0–6	2–16 (11%)	5–32 (14%)	7

- Bahrain and Bangladesh promoted to Group III in 1999.

== Europe/Africa Zone ==
=== Group I ===
Second Round Play-offs
Oslo, Norway (clay)
Croatia	3
Norway	2
Pörtschach, Austria (clay)
Austria	5
Denmark	0

First Round Play-offs
Croatia
bye
bye
Norway
Austria
bye
Denmark
bye

First Round
France
bye
Helsinki, Finland (hard)
Croatia	2
Finland	3
Romania
bye
bye
Norway
Israel
bye
bye
Austria
Kyiv, Ukraine (indoor carpet)
Ukraine	3
Denmark	2
bye
Great Britain

Second Round
Helsinki, Finland (indoor carpet)
France	4
Finland	1
Bucharest, Romania (indoor hard)
Romania	4
Norway	1
Ramat HaSharon, Israel (hard)
Israel	4
Austria	1
Newcastle, England (indoor carpet)
Ukraine	0
Great Britain	5

- Norway and Denmark relegated to Group II in 1999.
- France, Romania, Israel, and Great Britain advance to World Group qualifying round.

=== Group II ===
Relegation Play-offs
Sofia, Bulgaria (clay)
Bulgaria	5
Luxembourg	0
Bydgoszcz, Poland (clay)
Poland	4
Egypt	1
Jūrmala, Latvia (clay)
Latvia	5
Georgia	0
Dublin, Ireland (carpet)
Monaco	0
Ireland	5

First Round
Meknes, Morocco (indoor clay)
Morocco	3
Bulgaria	2
Minsk, Belarus (indoor carpet)
Belarus	5
Luxembourg	0
Dakar, Senegal (hard)
Poland	2
Senegal	3
Abidjan, Ivory Coast (hard)
Ivory Coast	3
Egypt	2
Jūrmala, Latvia (indoor carpet)
Yugoslavia	3
Latvia	2
Braga, Portugal (clay)
Georgia	0
Portugal	5
Roquebrune-Cap-Martin, France (clay)
Slovenia	5
Monaco	0
Budapest, Hungary (clay)
Ireland	1
Hungary	4

Second Round
Agadir, Morocco (clay)
Morocco	2
Belarus	3
Dakar, Senegal (hard)
Senegal	2
Ivory Coast	3
Belgrade, Yugoslavia (clay)
Yugoslavia	2
Portugal	3
Budapest, Hungary (clay)
Slovenia	2
Hungary	3

Third Round
Abidjan, Ivory Coast (hard)
Belarus	4
Ivory Coast	1
Albufeira, Portugal (hard)
Portugal	4
Hungary	1

- Luxembourg, Egypt, Georgia, and Monaco relegated to Group III in 1999.
- Belarus and Portugal promoted to Group I in 1999.

=== Group III ===
==== Zone A ====
- Venue: Amicale Tennis Association, Lomé, Togo
- Date: 21–25 January

Rank	Team
1	Greece
2	Togo
3	Estonia
4	Ghana
5	Bosnia and Herzegovina
6	Kenya
7	Madagascar
8	Cyprus

- Greece and Togo promoted to Group II in 1999.
- Madagascar and Cyprus relegated to Group IV in 1999.

==== Zone B ====
- Venue: Jug Tennis Club, Skopje, Macedonia
- Date: 20–24 May

Rank	Team
1	Turkey
2	Macedonia
3	Lithuania
4	Nigeria
5	Tunisia
6	Moldova
7	San Marino
8	Malta

- Turkey and Macedonia promoted to Group II in 1999.
- San Marino and Malta relegated to Group IV in 1999.

=== Group IV ===
==== Zone A ====
- Venue: Lugogo Tennis Club, Kampala, Uganda
- Date: 28 January–1 February

Rank	Team
1	Armenia
2	Benin
3	Botswana
4	Cameroon
5	Uganda
6	Azerbaijan
7	Sudan
8	Djibouti

- Armenia and Benin promoted to Group III in 1999.

==== Zone B ====
- Venue: Ndola Tennis Club, Ndola, Zambia
- Date: 6–10 May

	ZAM	ALG	ETH	ISL	LIE	RR; W–L	Match; W–L	Set; W–L	Standings
Zambia		2–1	3–0	3–0	3–0	4–0	11–1 (92%)	23–5 (82%)	1
Algeria	1–2		2–1	3–0	3–0	3–1	9–3 (75%)	19–13 (59%)	2
Ethiopia	0–3	1–2		2–1	2–1	2–2	5–7 (42%)	12–17 (41%)	3
Iceland	0–3	0–3	1–2		2–1	1–3	3–9 (25%)	12–19 (39%)	4
Liechtenstein	0–3	0–3	1–2	1–2		0–4	2–10 (17%)	9–21 (30%)	5

- Zambia and Algeria promoted to Group III in 1999.
