= Uzbekistan Davis Cup team =

National tennis team

Uzbekistan
- Nations Ranking: 45 ▼3 (3 February 2025)
- Colors: Blue & White
- First year: 1994
- Years played: 31
- Ties played (W–L): 73 (40-32)
- Best finish: WG Play-offs (1998, 1999, 2000, 2001, 2012, 2014, 2015, 2016 and 2018)
- Most total wins: Oleg Ogorodov (53–24)
- Most singles wins: Oleg Ogorodov (36–14)
- Most doubles wins: Oleg Ogorodov (17–10)
- Best doubles team: Oleg Ogorodov/ Dmitriy Tomashevich (12–5)
- Most ties played: Denis Istomin (33)
- Most years played: Denis Istomin (17)

The Uzbekistan men's national tennis team represents Uzbekistan in Davis Cup tennis competition and is governed by the Uzbekistan Tennis Federation.

Uzbekistan currently compete in the Asia/Oceania Zone of Group I. They have never competed in the World Group, but reached the Play-offs on nine occasions (1998-2001, 2009, 2012, 2014-2016 and 2018).

== History ==
Uzbekistan competed in its first Davis Cup in 1994. Uzbek players previously competed for the USSR.

== Current team (2025) ==
- Sergey Fomin
- Damir Abdusamadov
- Khumoyun Sultanov
- Amir Milushev
- Maxim Shin

== Events ==
1. 2023 Davis Cup World Group I: UZB 1-3 BEL
2. 2024 Davis Cup World Group II: UZB 3-1 EST
3. 2025 Davis Cup World Group II: UZB 1-3 HKG
4. 2026 Davis Cup World Group II play-offs: UZB 1-3 NGR

== Statistics ==
Last updated: United States – Uzbekistan; 7 March 2020

Record

- Total: 38–26 (59.4%)

Head-to-head record (1994–)

| DC team | Pld | W | L |
|---|---|---|---|
| Australia | 3 | 0 | 3 |
| Bahrain | 2 | 2 | 0 |
| Brunei | 1 | 1 | 0 |
| China | 10 | 7 | 3 |
| Chinese Taipei | 1 | 1 | 0 |
| Czech Republic | 1 | 0 | 1 |
| Great Britain | 1 | 0 | 1 |
| India | 5 | 2 | 3 |
| Indonesia | 3 | 3 | 0 |
| Japan | 4 | 2 | 2 |
| Jordan | 1 | 1 | 0 |
| Kazakhstan | 1 | 0 | 1 |
| Lebanon | 2 | 2 | 0 |
| Netherlands | 1 | 0 | 1 |
| New Zealand | 4 | 4 | 0 |
| Pakistan | 3 | 3 | 0 |
| Philippines | 2 | 2 | 0 |
| Qatar | 1 | 1 | 0 |
| Serbia | 2 | 0 | 2 |
| South Korea | 6 | 5 | 1 |
| Spain | 1 | 0 | 1 |
| Sri Lanka | 1 | 1 | 0 |
| Switzerland | 1 | 0 | 1 |
| Thailand | 5 | 1 | 4 |
| United States | 2 | 0 | 2 |
| Total (25) | 64 | 38 | 26 |

Record against continents

| Africa | Asia | Europe | North America | Oceania | South America |
|---|---|---|---|---|---|
| | Bahrain; Brunei; China; Chinese Taipei; India; Indonesia; Japan; Jordan; Kazakhstan; Lebanon; Pakistan; Philippines; Qatar; South Korea; Sri Lanka; Thailand | Czech Republic; Great Britain; Netherlands; Serbia; Spain; Switzerland | United States | Australia; New Zealand | |
| Record: 0–0 | Record: 34–14 (70.8%) | Record: 0–7 (0.0%) | Record: 0–2 (0.0%) | Record: 4–3 (57.1%) | Record: 0–0 |

Record by decade

- 1990–1999: 14–5 (73.7%)
- 2000–2009: 13–10 (56.5%)
- 2010–2019: 11–10 (52.4%)
- 2020–2029: 0–1 (0.0%)

== See also ==
- Davis Cup
- Uzbekistan Billie Jean King Cup team
- Uzbekistan at the Hopman Cup
