= Roland So =

Filipino tennis player (born 1966)

- Country (sports): Philippines
- Born: 22 June 1966 (age 59)

Singles
- Highest ranking: No. 367 (22 March 1993)

Grand Slam singles results
- Wimbledon: Q1 (1992, 1993)
- US Open: Q1 (1993)

Doubles
- Career record: 0-1 (ATP Tour)
- Highest ranking: No. 373 (22 March 1993)
Medal record
Southeast Asian Games
Gold medal – first place	1991 Manila	Doubles
Gold medal – first place	1993 Singapore	Team
Silver medal – second place	1991 Manila	Team
Silver medal – second place	1993 Singapore	Singles
Bronze medal – third place	1991 Manila	Mixed Doubles
Bronze medal – third place	1991 Manila	Singles

Roland So (born 22 June 1966) is a Filipino former professional tennis player.

== Tennis career ==
So represented the Philippines in eight Davis Cup ties between 1986 and 1993, winning six singles and two doubles rubbers. One of his singles wins came against Wimbledon quarter-finalist Shuzo Matsuoka of Japan.

While competing on the professional tour, So reached a career high singles ranking of 367 in the world, featuring in the qualifying draws of both the Australian Open and US Open tournaments.

So played college tennis for Louisiana State University (LSU), where he earned All-American honors in 1989.

At the 1991 Southeast Asian Games he partnered with LSU teammate Felix Barrientos to win a doubles gold medal for the Philippines. He was also a two-time singles medalist at the Southeast Asian Games, which included a silver medal in 1993, behind Indonesia's Suwandi Suwandi.
