= Lien Yu-hui =

Taiwanese tennis player (born 1970)

- Country (sports): Chinese Taipei
- Born: 19 June 1970 (age 55)
- Height: 185 cm (6 ft 1 in)
- Prize money: $10,780

Singles
- Career record: 11–13 (ATP Tour & Davis Cup)
- Highest ranking: No. 527 (21 Jul 1997)

Doubles
- Career record: 9–9 (ATP Tour & Davis Cup)
- Highest ranking: No. 345 (17 Oct 1994)

Lien Yu-hui (Chinese: 連玉輝, born 19 June 1970) is a Taiwanese former professional tennis player.

Debuting in 1988, Lien's Davis Cup career spanned 10 years and he competed in a total of 19 ties, winning 20 rubbers overall. With victories in nine doubles rubbers, he is Chinese Taipei's most successful ever Davis Cup doubles player.

Lien played on the professional tour in the 1990s and reached a career high singles ranking of 527. He featured in his only ATP Tour main draw in 1992, at his home tournament in Taipei, falling in the first round to Brett Steven.

In 1996 he represented Chinese Taipei at the Atlanta Olympics, as partner of Chen Chih-jung in the doubles draw. They were beaten in the first round by Ivorian brothers Claude and Clement N'Goran.
