= Felix Barrientos =

Filipino tennis player (born 1967)

- Country (sports): Philippines
- Born: 20 November 1967 (age 58) Manila, Philippines
- Height: 5 ft 10 in (178 cm)
- Plays: Right-handed
- Prize money: $33,202

Singles
- Career record: 2–3
- Highest ranking: No. 180 (22 April 1991)

Doubles
- Career record: 0–1
- Highest ranking: No. 529 (26 March 1990)
Medal record
Tennis
Representing Philippines
Southeast Asian Games
Gold medal – first place	1991 Manila	Singles
Gold medal – first place	1991 Manila	Doubles
Gold medal – first place	1991 Manila	Mixed Doubles
Gold medal – first place	1993 Singapore	Team
Gold medal – first place	1993 Singapore	Mixed Doubles
Silver medal – second place	1991 Manila	Team
Bronze medal – third place	1993 Singapore	Singles

Felix Barrientos (born 20 November 1967) is a Filipino former professional tennis player.

== Biography ==
Barrientos was a highly ranked player on the juniors circuit, most notably reaching the semi-finals of the boys' singles at the 1985 Wimbledon Championships.

Having attended Colegio San Agustin in Makati, he played American collegiate tennis at Louisiana State University (LSU) on a scholarship and was a member of the team which reached the final of the 1988 NCAA Division I Men's Tennis Championships. In the final against Stanford he won in the singles against Patrick McEnroe, but LSU still lost the finals series 2–5.

A right-handed player, Barrientos won several medals for the Philippines at the Southeast Asian Games, three of them gold medals, including in the men's singles when Manila hosted the event in 1991.

As a professional player he was ranked as high as 180, breaking into the top 200 after he made the quarter-finals of the Hong Kong Open in 1991, during which he had a win over Kevin Curren. His other singles main draw appearance on the ATP Tour came at the 1991 Queen's Club Championships, then at Taipei the following year, for first round losses to Pat Cash and John Fitzgerald respectively.

Barrientos was a regular member of the Philippines Davis Cup team during his career and featured in a total of 15 ties, for an 18/5 win–loss record in singles and overall record of 26/10. In 1991 he helped the Philippines reach the World Group playoffs.

Now based in Singapore, Barrientos works in private banking for LGT.
