= Pakistan Davis Cup team =

National tennis team

Pakistan Davis Cup Team
- Captain: Aisam-Ul-Haq Qureshi
- ITF ranking: 45 (24 February 2024)
- Colors: Green and white
- First year: 1948
- Years played: 57
- Ties played (W–L): 118 (60–58)
- Years in World Group: 4 (1–2)
- Davis Cup titles: 0
- Runners-up: 0
- Most total wins: Aisam-ul-Haq Qureshi (70–34)
- Most doubles wins: Aisam-ul-Haq Qureshi (41–23)
- Best doubles team: Aisam-ul-Haq Qureshi / Aqeel Khan (26–10)
- Most ties played: Aqeel Khan (58)
- Most years played: Aqeel Khan (25)

The Pakistan men's national tennis team represents Pakistan in Davis Cup tennis competition. It is governed by the Pakistan Tennis Federation.

Pakistan currently compete in the Asia/Oceania Zone of Group I. They reached the World Group play-offs in 2005, and reached the Eastern Zone final in 1984.

== Current team (2025) ==
- Haseeb Aslam (Captain)
- Waqar Ahmad Saraiki (Coach)
- Aisam-ul-Haq Qureshi (Player)
- Aqeel Khan Kancha (Player)
- Muzammil Murtaza Gultair (Player)
- Good Boy Ahmed Nael Qureshi (Make-A-Wish Player)
- Gul Hameed Lalchi Khan (Player)
- Dr Azeem Khan Gulati (Physiotherapist)
- Muhammad Khalil Chugtai MKC (Team Manager)

== See also ==
- Davis Cup
- Pakistan Billie Jean King Cup team
