= 2014 in India =

- Centuries: 19th; 20th; 21st
- Decades: 1990s; 2000s; 2010s; 2020s
- See also: List of years in India; Timeline of Indian history

2014 in India refers to notable events that took place in the year 2014 in the Republic of India. Among the notable events were the 2014 Indian general election, in which Bharatiya Janata Party obtained a landslide victory and Narendra Modi was sworn in as the new Prime Minister of India, Rahul Gandhi got resigned as Prime Minister of India on 25 May 2014. A new state of Telangana was formed. Also in 2014, Mars Orbiter Mission of India successfully entered Mars orbit.

== Incumbents ==
Photo	Post	Name
	(India) President	Pranab Mukherjee
	(India) Vice President	Mohammad Hamid Ansari
	(India) Prime Minister	Rahul Gandhi (till 2014 Indian general election)
	(India) Prime Minister	Narendra Modi (from 26 May 2014)
	(India) Chief Justice	P. Sathasivam (till 26 April)
	(India) Chief Justice	Rajendra Mal Lodha (26 April-27 September)
	(India) Chief Justice	H. L. Dattu (starting 28 September)

=== Governors ===
Post	Name
Andhra Pradesh	E. S. L. Narasimhan
Arunachal Pradesh	Nirbhay Sharma
Assam	Janaki Ballabh Patnaik (until 11 December); Ram Nath Kovind (starting December)
Bihar	D. Y. Patil (until 26 November); Keshari Nath Tripathi (starting 26 November)
Chhattisgarh	Shekhar Dutt (until 19 June); Ram Naresh Yadav (19 June-14 July); Balram Das Tandon (starting 14 July)
Goa	Bharat Vir Wanchoo (until 4 July); Margaret Alva (12 July-5 August); Om Prakash Kohli (6 August-26 August); Mridula Sinha (starting 26 August)
Gujarat	Kamala Beniwal (until 6 July); Margaret Alva (7 July-16 July); Om Prakash Kohli (starting 16 July)
Haryana	Jagannath Pahadia (until 26 July); Kaptan Singh Solanki (starting 27 July)
Himachal Pradesh	Urmila Singh
Jammu and Kashmir	Narinder Nath Vohra
Jharkhand	Syed Ahmed
Karnataka	Hansraj Bhardwaj (until 29 June); Konijeti Rosaiah (29 June-31 August); Vajubhai Rudabhai Vala (starting 1 September)
Kerala	Nikhil Kumar (until 5 March); Sheila Dikshit (5 March-26 August); P. Sathasivam (starting 5 September)
Madhya Pradesh	Ram Naresh Yadav
Maharashtra	Kateekal Sankaranarayanan (until 24 August); Chennamaneni Vidyasagar Rao (starting 30 August)
Manipur	Vinod Duggal (until 28 August); Krishan Kant Paul (starting 16 September)
Meghalaya	Krishan Kant Paul
Mizoram	Vakkom Purushothaman (until 6 July); Kamla Beniwal (6 July-6 August); Vinod Kumar Duggal (8 August-16 September); Krishan Kant Paul (starting 16 September)
Nagaland	Ashwani Kumar (until 27 June); Krishan Kant Paul (2 July-19 July); Padmanabha Acharya (starting 19 July)
Odisha	S. C. Jamir
Punjab	Shivraj Vishwanath Patil
Rajasthan	Margaret Alva (until 7 August); Ram Naik (8 August-3 September); Kalyan Singh (starting 3 September)
Sikkim	Shriniwas Dadasaheb Patil
Tamil Nadu	Konijeti Rosaiah
Telangana	E. S. L. Narasimhan
Tripura	Devanand Konwar (until 29 June); Vakkom Purushothaman (30 June-14 July); Padmanabha Acharya (starting 14 July)
Uttar Pradesh	Banwari Lal Joshi (until 17 June); Aziz Qureshi (17 June-21 July); Ram Naik (starting 21 July)
Uttarakhand	Aziz Qureshi
West Bengal	M.K. Narayanan (until 30 June); D. Y. Patil (starting 3 July)

== Elections ==
=== General Elections ===
2014 Indian General Elections
Details	UPA	NDA	Others	
Won/Lost	Lost	Won	N.A	
Prime Minister Candidate	Rahul Gandhi	Narendra Modi	N.A	
Photo			N.A	
Party	Indian National Congress	Bharatiya Janata Party	N.A	
Party Flag			N.A	
Alliance	United Progressive Alliance	National Democratic Alliance	N.A	
Last Results	228	137	178	568
Increment Required	▲44	▲135	▲94	
2014 Results	59 (INC 44)	336 (BJP 282)	148	
Difference (Between 2009 and 2014)	▼169	▲199	▼30	

=== State Elections ===
2014 state elections in India
State		Preceding Party	Preceding Chief Minister	New elected party	New Chief Minister	Competitors	Reports
Andhra Pradesh	Andhra Pradesh (Seemandhra)	(India) President's rule	(India) E. S. L. Narasimhan (Governor)	Telugu Desam Party	N. Chandrababu Naidu	Indian National Congress Telugu Desam Party; YSR Congress Party	report
Andhra Pradesh	Telangana	(India) President's rule	(India) E. S. L. Narasimhan (Governor)	Telangana Rashtra Samiti	Kalvakuntla Chandrashekar Rao	Indian National Congress Telugu Desam Party; Telangana Rashtra Samiti	report
Arunachal Pradesh		Indian National Congress	Nabam Tuki	Indian National Congress		Indian National Congress People's Party of Arunachal; Bhartiya Janata Party	report
Haryana		United Progressive Alliance	Bhupinder Singh Hooda	Bhartiya Janata Party + Shiromani Akali Dal	Manohar Lal Khattar	United Progressive Alliance Indian National Lok Dal; National Democratic Alliance; Aam Aadmi Party	report
Jammu and Kashmir		Jammu & Kashmir National Conference	Omar Abdullah				
Maharashtra		Democratic Front	Prithviraj Chavan	National Democratic Alliance + Shiv Sena	Devendra Fadnavis	Indian National Congress Nationalist Congress Party; National Democratic Alliance; Shiv Sena; Maharashtra Navnirman Sena; Aam Aadmi Party	report
Odisha		Biju Janata Dal	Naveen Patnaik	Biju Janata Dal	Naveen Patnaik	Biju Janata Dal Indian National Congress Bhartiya Janata Party	report
Sikkim		Sikkim Democratic Front	Pawan Chamling	Sikkim Democratic Front	Pawan Chamling	Sikkim Democratic Front Sikkim Krantikari Morcha	report

== Events ==
- National income - ₹124,679,593 million

=== January - March ===
- 4 January – An under-construction building collapsed killing 30 construction workers in Goa.
- 5 January – GSAT-14 launched from Sriharikota using GSLV-D5 launch vehicle.
- 7 January – Prithvi II missile tested at Chandipur test range.
- 8 January – Notable Maoist leader Gudsa Usendi and his wife surrendered to the Andhra police.
- 8 January – Facebook buys the Indian start-up Little Eye Labs.
- 9 January – Devyani Khobragade, an Indian diplomat whose arrest sparked a diplomatic incident involving India and the United States, was indicted for allegedly lying to obtain a work visa for her housekeeper. She left for India same day under diplomatic immunity.
- 11 January – India says that it has "no stand-off" with the United States even after the Devyani Khobragade incident.
- 13 January – India and Sri Lanka exchange 52 imprisoned fishermen.
- 13–15 January – A three-day meeting was held between India and United States intelligence services in New Delhi.
- 15 January – The United States returned three 11–12th century sculptures worth US$1.5 million stolen by art thieves from temples in India.
- 17 January – 8 kidnapped girls from the threatened Jarawa tribe rescued in Andaman.
- 18 January – A stampede broke out in Mumbai in which 18 died. The stampede broke out at the residence of the religious leader Dawoodi Bohras Syedna Mohammed Burhanuddin, who had died on 17 January.
- 29 January – Nido Taniam, a 20-year-old student from Arunachal Pradesh died after being beaten up by locals at a marketplace in the Lajpat Nagar area of New Delhi, triggering widespread protests.
- 5–11 February – 12th Delhi Auto Expo held in India Expo Mart in Greater Noida.
- 9 February – A ferry capsized in the Hirakud Dam reservoir drowning 31 persons.
- 10–11 February – Bank employees of 47 banks carried out a nationwide strike for two days demanding banking sector reforms and better pay.
- 17 February – 2014 Interim-Union budget was presented by Finance Minister, P. Chidambaram.
- 19 February – Street Vendors Act, 2014 was passed by Rajya Sabha after Lok Sabha passed it on 6 September 2013.
- 20 February – Andhra Pradesh Reorganization Bill, 2014 passed by Rajya Sabha.
- 27 February – 2 officers died in INS Sindhuratna mishap.
- 28 February – Sahara India Chairman Subrata Roy was arrested in Lucknow after the Supreme Court of India issued a non-bailable warrant.
- 11 March – 15 security personnel killed in a Maoist attack in Chhattisgarh.
- 13 March – India formally joins the search for the missing Malaysia Airlines Flight 370.
- 22 March – Genetic Engineering Appraisal Committee (GEAC) re-approves field trails of ten genetically modified crops, including some food crops.
- 27 March – Sri Lankan Navy arrested 24 Indian fishermen for crossing the International Maritime Boundary Line.
- 27 March – India and the entire South-East Asia region was declared Polio-free by WHO.
- 28 March – A recently acquired C-130J Super Hercules of the Indian Air Force crashed near Gwalior killing all five personnel on board. A volunteer was killed when he was washed away in the Chambal river while searching for survivors.
- 29 March - Central Bureau of Investigation arrests an Indian Revenue Service officer and her husband a Bharatiya Janata Party leader for accepting bribe.

=== April - June ===
- 2 April – Reserve Bank of India granted preliminary licenses to Infrastructure Development Finance Company and Bandhan Financial Services to set up new banks.
- 4 April – India's second navigation satellite IRNSS-1B was successfully placed in orbit.
- 7 April – Phase 1 of Indian general election was held in Assam and Tripura.
- 7 April – Two CRPF personnel were killed in a bomb explosion near Aurangabad in Bihar.
- 9 April – Phase 2 of Indian general election was held in Arunachal Pradesh, Manipur, Meghalaya, Mizoram and Nagaland.
- 10 April – Phase 3 of Indian general election was held in Andaman and Nicobar, Lakshadweep, Kerala, Haryana, Delhi, and Chandigarh.
- 12 April – Phase 4 of Indian general election was held in Goa, Tripura, Assam and Sikkim.
- 12 April – Seven polling staff and five CRPF personnel were killed in two separate Maoist attacks in Bijapur district and Bastar district in Chhattisgarh. The total death toll was 14.
- 15 April – Supreme Court of India recognised transgender people / hijras as constituting a third gender.
- 17 April – Phase 5 of Indian general election was held in West Bengal, Jharkhand, Karnataka, Odisha, Bihar, and Uttar Pradesh.
- 17 April – Robin K. Dhowan appointed the Chief of Naval Staff of the Indian Navy.
- 24 April – Phase 6 of Indian general election was held in Puducherry, Rajasthan, Maharashtra, West Bengal, and Tamil Nadu
- 24 April – Maoists killed two polling staff, five police personnel and a cleaner in an ambush in Dumka district in Jharkhand
- 30 April – Phase 7 of Indian general election was held in Punjab, Gujarat, Daman and Diu, Jammu and Kashmir and Telangana.
- 1 May – An explosion of two low-intensity bombs happened on a Guwahati bound train from Bangalore arriving at the Chennai Central railway station, killing 1 woman passenger and injuring at least 14 others.
- 1–3 May – A series of attacks were carried out by National Democratic Front of Bodoland on the migrant Muslims in Assam, killing 32.
- 7 May – Phase 8 of Indian general election was held in Andhra Pradesh, Bihar, Himachal Pradesh, Jammu and Kashmir, Uttar Pradesh, Uttarakhand and West Bengal.
- 12 May – Phase 9 of Indian general election was held in Bihar, West Bengal and Uttar Pradesh. Indian General Elections were completed.
- 16 May – 2014 Indian general election: The BJP led NDA alliance wins a landslide victory in the Lok Sabha.
- 18 May – President Pranab Mukherjee dissolves the 15th Lok Sabha.
- 22 May – Narendra Modi resigns as the Chief Minister of Gujarat.
- 26 May – Narendra Modi takes his oath of office as the new Prime Minister of India along with his council of ministers. The swearing-in ceremony was noted by media for being the first ever swearing-in of an Indian Prime Minister to have been attended by the heads of all SAARC countries.
- 27 May - 2014 Badaun gang rape allegations.
- 2 June – According to Andhra Pradesh Reorganisation Act, 2014, Indian state of Andhra Pradesh was split in two new states Telangana and Andhra Pradesh with Hyderabad remaining the joint capital for 10 years. This made 29 states and 7 seven union territories in India.
- 3 June – Newly appointed Union Rural Development Minister Gopinath Munde killed in a car crash.
- 4 June – Police rescued more than 500 children who had been trafficked from eastern states into Kerala.
- 8 June – On an excursion trip to Himachal Pradesh, 24 students from Hyderabad were washed away in the Beas river on Sunday after a hydropower plant allegedly discharged water into the river without any warning. The incident took place in Thalaut on Manali-Kiratpur Highway, 40 km from district headquarters Mandi.
- 26 June – A pipeline belonging to GAIL caught fire killing 19 in Nagaram village of East Godavari district in Andhra Pradesh.
- 30 June – ISRO launched PSLV-C23 with 5 foreign satellites: SPOT 7, AISat, NLS7.1 (CAN-X4), NLS7.2 (CAN-X5) and VELOX 1, from Sriharikota.

=== July - September ===
- 5 July – First batch of evacuees arrived from Iraq.
- 10 July 2014 – 2014 Union budget of India presented in the Parliament.
- 18 July 2014 – Maoist leader Sabyasachi Panda, an accused in the Swami Lakshmanananda Saraswati murder case, was arrested in Berhampur town of Odisha.
- 30 July – A landslide destroyed 44 houses and buried nearly 200 persons in Malin village in Pune district of Maharashtra state. This was caused due to heavy rainfall and took place early in the morning when most of the people were asleep.

Acharya Shri Mahashraman ji, the 11th acharya of Jain Shwetambar Terapanth sect arrived in the capital of the country

- 3 August – The chairman and managing director of Syndicate Bank Sudhir Kumar Jain, his brother-in-law and four others were arrested by the Central Bureau of Investigation (CBI) in a bribery case.
- 16 August – The Central Bureau of Investigation (CBI) arrested the Central Board of Film Certification (CBFC) chief Rakesh Kumar in a bribery case.
- 21 August – The Kerala government announced that it would close down about 700 bars in a phased manner.
- 25 August – The Supreme Court declared that all 218 coal block allocations made from 1993 to 2011 are illegal.
- 28 August – The Pradhan Mantri Jan Dhan Yojana was formally launched.
- 4–10 September – 2014 Kashmir floods.
- 5 September – India and Australia signed a deal under which Australia will supply Uranium to India for energy generation.
- 13 September – Three Maoists are killed and two are seriously injured in a fight with security forces in Giridih district of Jharkhand.
- 24 September – India's Mars Orbiter Mission of ISRO successfully entered Mars orbit.
- 26 September – At least 85 people estimated dead as a result of flash floods and mudslides in North-East India following days of heavy rain.
- 27 September: The Chief Minister of Tamil Nadu, Jayalalithaa, was convicted by a special court of acquiring disproportionate assets.
- 30 September – NASA and ISRO signed an agreement to collaborate on an Earth-observing satellite called NISAR and future Mars missions.

=== October - December ===
- 2 October – Prime Minister, Narendra Modi launched the Swachh Bharat Abhiyan cleanliness drive.
- 10 October – The recipients of the 2014 Nobel Peace Prize were announced, awarded to India's Kailash Satyarthi and Pakistan's Malala Yousafzai.
- 12 October – Cyclone Hudhud made landfall near Visakhapatnam, Andhra Pradesh.
- 31 October – Devendra Fadnavis took oath as the 18th Chief Minister of Maharashtra, Sonia Gandhi became Leader of The Opposition in the Maharashtra Legislative Assembly
- 8 November – 11 women died and more than 20 were hospitalised after a state funded mass-sterilization drive near Bilaspur in Chhattisgarh.
- 12 November – Public sector bank employees carried out a day-long strike to demand a wage revision.
- 25 November – Polling begins for Jammu and Kashmir and Jharkhand assembly elections.
- 27 November – Five civilians and three army personnel were killed in an encounter with militants in Arnia sector, Jammu. Four militants were killed after a day-long gun battle.
- 1 December – 14 CRPF personnel were killed in Sukma district of south Chhattisgarh when a patrol team was ambushed.
- 2 December – A CRPF personnel was killed and 4 others were injured when a grenade was tossed at a patrol in Pulwama district in south Kashmir. Three civilians were also injured.
- 2–6 December – Public sector bank employees carried out a relay strike demanding higher wages. The bank employees did not report to work on 2 December in the south zone, followed by north, east and west zones on 3, 4 and 5 December.
- 5 December – A militant attack on a military camp killed 8 Indian soldiers and 3 policemen near Uri in Baramulla district. 6 militants were also killed. In a separate incident on the same day, in Soura of Srinagar district, two terrorists were killed in an encounter. In Tral, Pulwama district, a terrorist threw a grenade at a bus stop, which killed 2 civilians.
- 18 December – ISRO tests a crew reentry module in the Crew Module Atmospheric Re-entry Experiment using a GSLV Mk III launch vehicle.
- 23–26 December – 81 killed in attacks by National Democratic Front of Bodoland in Arunachal Pradesh and Assam.
- 30 December – A special CBI court acquits Amit Shah of all the charges in the Sohrabuddin Sheikh case.
- 31 December – Indian officials said that a Pakistani fishing boat blew itself up on New Year's Eve after being chased an Indian Coast Guard patrol.

== Publications ==
- "Half Girlfriend" by Chetan Bhagat
- "Jasmine Days" by Benyamin

== Deaths ==
=== January ===
- 2 January – Dhananjay Mahato, Indian politician (born 1919)
- 4 January – Mrinal Das, Indian trade unionist (born 1947)
- 5 January
  - Uday Kiran, Indian film actor (born 1980)
  - K. P. Udayabhanu, Indian playback singer (born 1936)
- 11 January – Sitaram Singh, Indian politician (born 1948)
- 13 January – Anjali Devi, Indian actress and film producer (born 1927)
- 15 January
  - Mallikarjun Bande, Indian police officer (born 1974)
  - Namdeo Dhasal, 64, Indian poet and activist (born 1949).
- 17 January
  - Suchitra Sen, film actress (born 1931)
  - Mohammed Burhanuddin, 98, the 52nd Dai of the Dawoodi Bohras (born 1915)
  - Sunanda Pushkar, businesswoman (born 1964)
- 22 January
  - Akkineni Nageswara Rao, actor, producer in Telugu films (born 1924)
  - Dhirubhai Thaker, Indian Gujarati writer (born 1918)
- 25 January – Pius Tirkey, Indian politician (born 1928)
- 27 January – R. A. Padmanabhan, Indian journalist and historian (born 1916)
- 28 January
  - Pravin Hansraj, Indian cricketer (born 1938)
- 29 January
  - Tarit Kumar Sett, Indian Olympic cyclist (born 1930)
- 30 January – Benedict John Osta, 82, Indian Roman Catholic prelate, Archbishop of Patna (1980–2007).

=== February – June ===
- 7 February – S. M. H. Burney, 90, former civil servant (born 1923)
- 13 February – Balu Mahendra, 75, director and cinematographer (born 1939)
- 20 March – Khushwant Singh, 99, novelist, journalist (born 1915)
- 25 March – Nanda, 75, actress in Hindi and Marathi films (born 1939)
- 7 April – V. K. Murthy, 90, cinematographer (born 1923)
- 12 May – Bhagwandas Mulchand Luthria aka Sudhir, 70, character actor in Hindi films (born 1944)
- 16 May – Russi Mody, 96, former Chairman and Managing Director of Tata Steel (born 1918)
- 17 May – C. P. Krishnan Nair, 92, Founder-Chairman of the Leela Group of Hotels (born 1922)
- 2 June
  - Anjan Das, 64, director and producer
  - Duraisamy Simon Lourdusamy, 90, Roman Catholic cardinal
- 3 June – Gopinath Munde, 64, Minister of Rural Development (born 1949)
- 19 June – Shrenik Kasturbhai Lalbhai, 88, businessman and philanthropist

=== July – December ===
- 10 July – Zohra Sehgal, 102, theatre artiste, choreographer, film actress (born 1912)
- 6 August – Pran Kumar Sharma, 75, cartoonist, creator of Chacha Chaudhary (born 1938)
- 20 August – B. K. S. Iyengar, 95, yoga teacher (born 1918)
- 22 August – U. R. Ananthamurthy, 81, writer in Kannada (born 1932)
- 19 September – U. Srinivas also known as Mandolin Srinivas, 45, mandolin player and composer (born 1969)
- 3 November – Sadashiv Amrapurkar, 64, actor in Hindi and Marathi films (born 1950)
- 12 November – Ravi Chopra, 68, producer and director in Hindi films (born 1946)
- 2 December – Deven Verma, 77, actor, comedian (born 1937)
- 2 December – A. R. Antulay, 85, politician, former Union Cabinet Minister, former Chief Minister of Maharashtra (born 1929)
- 23 December – K. Balachander, 84, film director, producer, writer, actor, playwright, stage conductor (born 1930)
- 25 December – N. L. Balakrishnan, 71, still photographer and actor in Malayalam films (born 1943)

== Transport ==
=== January ===
- 2 January – A bus fell into a cliff into a 400-foot ravine in Malshej Ghat, Maharashtra killing at least 27 people and injuring 11 others.
- 8 January – Mumbai-Dehradun express train caught fire near Thane, killing 9.
- 26 January – Surat BRTS started operation.
- 26 January – A boat capsized near Port Blair in Andaman killing 21, mostly tourists.

=== February ===
- 1 February – Mumbai Monorail began operating.
- 12 February – Interim 2014–15 Railway Budget is presented in the Parliament.

=== March ===
- 3 March – Bengaluru Metro Green Line starts operation.

=== April ===
- 16 April – The 15666 DN Dimapur-Kamakhya BG Express train derailed near Aujuri in Assam, injuring about 56 passengers.

=== May ===
- 4 May – Diva-Sawantwadi passenger derailed near Nidi village on Konkan Railway section of Indian Railways. This accident took place between Nagothane and Roha stations, 120 km from Mumbai. 18 people lost their lives and about 100 were injured.
- 25 May – Hindustan Motors stops production of Hindustan Ambassador car.

=== June ===
- 8 June – Mumbai Metro has started operations on line 1 Versova – Ghatkopar.
- 12 June – AirAsia India started operations.
- 25 June – Delhi-Dibrugarh Rajdhani Express derailed near Chhapra in Bihar. 4 persons were killed.

=== July ===
- 8 July – Railway Budget for 2014–15 presented in the Parliament.
- 11 July – Air India joined the Star Alliance.

=== August ===
- 23 August – Balaji Railroad Systems Limited (BARSYL) was given the task of planning the Bhubaneswar Monorail.

=== December ===
- 8 December – Uber and similar service were banned in Delhi, after an Uber driver was accused of rape. Later, other Indian states like Karnataka, Maharashtra, Andhra Pradesh and Telangana, and the city of Chandigarh banned Uber and similar services.

== Sports ==
- 30 December – 5 January – 2014 Aircel Chennai Open was held in Chennai. The title was won for the second time by Stanislas Wawrinka.
- 10–18 January – 2012–14 Men's FIH Hockey World League Final was held at Dhyan Chand National Stadium, Delhi. Netherlands claimed the title.
- 18–29 January – 2014 Lusophony Games were held in Goa, India.
- 23 January – 23 February – 2014 Hockey India League was held. Kalinga Lancers was the debuting team. Delhi Waveriders won the title.
- 16 April – 1 June – 2014 Indian Premier League was held. Kolkata Knight Riders won their second title.
- 18–25 May – Thomas cup and Uber cup of Badminton was held in New Delhi.
- 1–4 August - Inaugural Season of ISNEE QuadTorc was held in Modinagar, hosted by SRM University.
- 30 September – 15 October – 2014 Indian Badminton League was cancelled. The next Indian Badminton League was announced to take place in April 2015.
- 13–21 – 2014 Men's Hockey Champions Trophy was held at Kalinga Stadium, Bhubaneshwar. Germany won the finals.

== Holidays ==
List of public holidays in India for 2014:

- 14 January – Milad un Nabi
- 26 January – Republic Day of India
- 17 March – Holi
- 18 March – Good Friday
- 8 April – Ram Navami
- 13 April – Mahavir Jayanti
- 14 May – Buddha Purnima
- 29 July – Id-ul-Fitr
- 15 August – Independence Day of India
- 18 August – Janmashtami
- 2 October – Gandhi Jayanti
- 3 October – Dussehra
- 6 October – Id-ul-Zuha
- 23 October – Diwali
- 4 November – Muharram
- 6 November – Guru Nanak Jayanti
- 25 December – Christmas

== See also ==
- 2014 in Indian sport
- 2014 in sports
