= Angellica Aribam =

Indian political activist

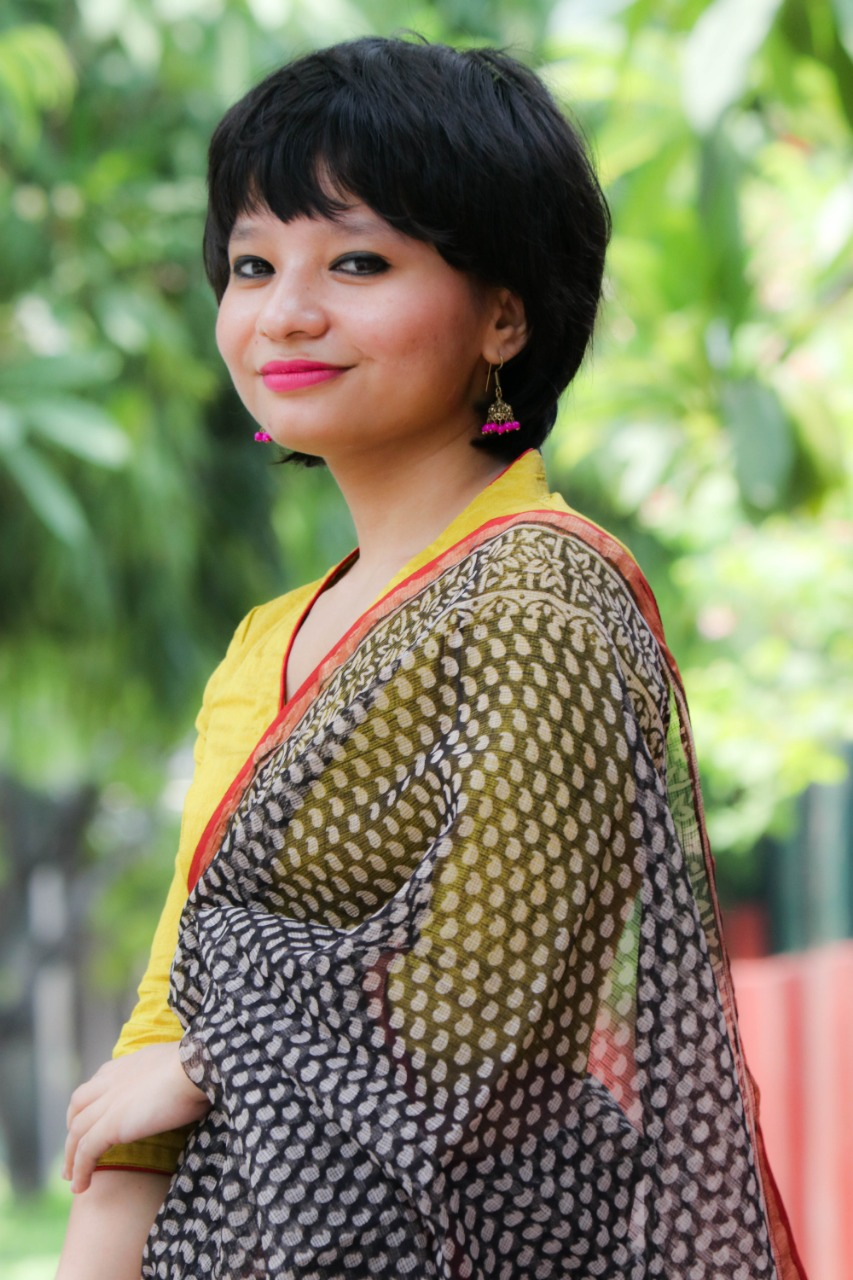
- Angellica Aribam

National General Secretary, NSUI
- In office 2016–2017 July

National Secretary, NSUI
- In office 2012- 2016

Delhi University Students' Union Executive Committee
- In office 2012–2013

Personal details
- Born: 22 January 1992 (age 34) Imphal, Manipur, India
- Education: Peking University (MPP); University of Delhi (B.Sc Biochemistry Honors)
- Occupation: Political activist, intersectional feminist
- Website: angellicaaribam.com

Angellica Aribam (born 22 January 1992) is an Indian political activist working on issues of gender, race, and the democratization of politics. She is the founder of Femme First Foundation, a non-govt organization working to promote women's political leadership in India . Aribam was also a National General Secretary of the National Students' Union of India, the students' wing of the Indian National Congress.

Aribam is an inaugural VVEngage Fellow for women political leaders at Vital Voices, an American NGO founded by Hillary Clinton and Madeleine Albright. In 2017, Aribam was named as one of Forbes India's 30 Under 30 for her work on policy and politics. She was the first student from the North-eastern region of India to be elected in the Delhi University Students' Union Executive Committee.

== Early life ==
Angellica Aribam was born in Imphal west, Manipur, India. She is the youngest of three siblings, born to Aribam M Sharma and (Late) Thoibi Devi. She moved to New Delhi at age 12 to complete her schooling.

== Education ==
Aribam went to school at Kendriya Vidyalaya, Andrews Ganj. She completed her bachelor's degree in biochemistry with Honors from Sri Venkateswara College, University of Delhi in 2012. During her sabbatical from political life in 2017–2018, Aribam was a MOFCOM scholar and completed her Masters’ in Public Policy from Peking University. Her master's degree thesis was focused on the public perception of stringent rape laws with respect to the Criminal Law (Amendment) Act 2013.

== Political journey ==
Aribam joined National Students’ Union of India (NSUI), the students’ wing of the Indian National Congress, in July 2012. In an interview, Aribam mentions how racism towards the north-eastern people in various Indian cities pushed her to join active politics.

In September 2012, Aribam was elected in the Campus Law Centre, Faculty of Law, University of Delhi. Subsequently, she contested and won the election for the executive committee of the Delhi University Students’ Union. With it, she became the first North-Easterner to be elected in Delhi University Students’ Union.

In December 2012, she was inducted as a National Secretary in the NSUI by Rahul Gandhi. She was the youngest person to join the national committee.

At the AICC session held in Jaipur in 2013, Aribam was the lone speaker from the entire North-east region. In her speech, she focused on the challenges faced by the North-east diaspora across the country.

In the run-up to the 16th Lok Sabha elections, Aribam co-anchored the consultations, formulation, and drafting processes of the Student Manifesto for the Indian National Congress.

In March 2016, Aribam was promoted to National General Secretary of the NSUI. She resigned from her position in July 2017 in a bid to create space for younger blood in the system, having served the organisation for five years. Aribam represented the Indian National Congress on various national and international media platforms.

== Activism ==
=== Anti-racism ===
Aribam is an anti-racism activist. She joined politics after the violence against North-east students in July 2012. Through her work with the NSUI and personal writings, she has repeatedly demanded the implementation of the Bezbaruah Committee recommendations. She called out BJP for referring to North-eastern Indians as "immigrants", leading to the party issuing a clarification. In an interview, Aribam sheds light on the responsibility that comes with representing a minority community, "when an individual from a minority community commits a mistake, then it is viewed as the mistake of the whole community and puts a lot more pressure on the representative to perform better as a leader".

In March 2020, Aribam faced severe online abuse wherein she was harassed with a derogatory racial slur which is punishable by Indian law. She filed a complaint with the Cyber Cell of Delhi Police. In light of the rising racial crimes due to COVID-19, her petition urging the prime minister of India to condemn racism received widespread support, following which the prime minister issued a statement.

=== Internet freedom and net neutrality ===
Aribam has been fighting for a free and open internet. She is a proponent of the principles of Net Neutrality. She played an instrumental role in the Congress party taking up the cause of Net Neutrality in the Indian Parliament in 2015.

=== Menstrual health ===
As a vocal advocate for menstrual health, Aribam has worked to ensure access to clean and hygienic sanitary products in Indian prisons. In 2015, she was detained by Delhi Police after a protest demanding greater women's security in the national capital. Her time in detention was mired in trauma as the prison couldn't provide her basic request for a menstrual pad. Following which, she took up the cause with Delhi Police urging that free sanitary pads be made available in prisons.

=== Women’s rights ===
Aribam is an intersectional feminist who believes in fourth-wave feminism. In September 2016, Aribam wrote an article highlighting the alleged sexism and misogyny that was prevalent in the women's hostel of Banaras Hindu University (BHU). This was the first popular article to expose the extent of gender discrimination in the BHU. Following this, protests intensified in the campus, as the BHU activists received support from across the country.

Aribam has been working to increase representation of women in politics. In an interview, she highlights the need for more marginalized communities at the decision-making table.

=== Different time zone for the north-east ===
In May 2017, Aribam started a petition requesting the Central government to notify a separate time zone for the North-east region. While India stretches 3,000 kilometers, it officially has only a single time zone. Experts believe that notifying different time zone will help maximize daylight working hours and also conserve energy.

== Gender representation and Femme First Foundation ==
Aribam has been a vocal advocate of increased representation for women in politics. She has, through her writings and various talks, advocated the passage of the Women's Reservation Bill and the need for greater representation for women. She has also opined that gender quotas need to be supplemented with capacity building and more incentives for the women in the political organizations.

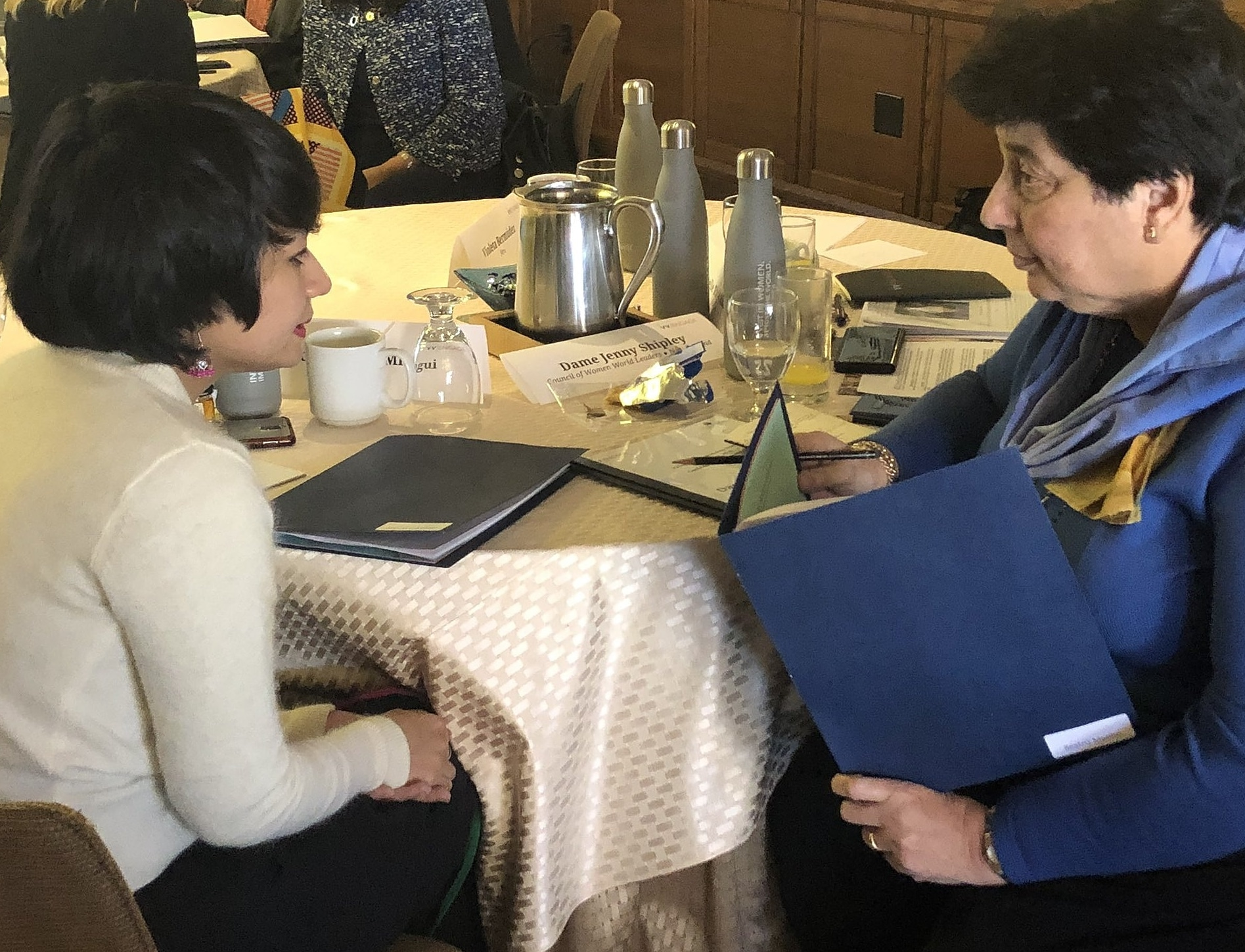
Angellica Aribam negotiating a deal with Prime Minister Beatriz Merino in a simulation exercise.

Aribam is the Founder and Director of Femme First Foundation (FFF). FFF is a non-partisan, non-profit organization that is focused on amplifying women leadership by training and grooming women political leaders.

== Awards and recognition ==
=== Forbes India 30 Under 30 ===
Aribam was named as one of Forbes India's 30 Under 30 in 2017 in the Law, Policy, and Politics category. Forbes described her as someone "fighting racism with elan". On Aribam's recognition as a 30 Under 30 by Forbes, former Union Minister Dr. Shashi Tharoor said, "As a young lady from Manipur, making her way in politics entirely by dint of her own hard work, Aribam serves as an inspiration to young Indians, particularly from marginalised regions, to join public life, to serve and to make a difference".

=== VVEngage Fellow ===
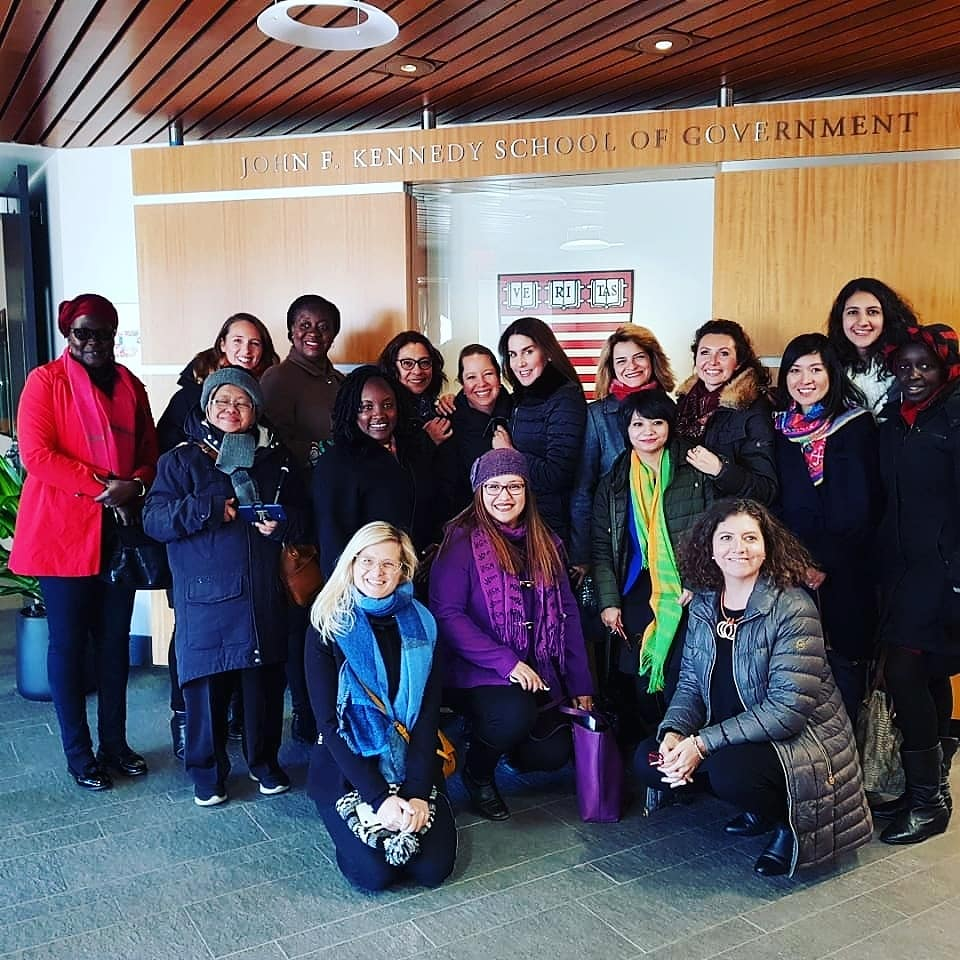
The inaugural cohort of VV Engage at the Harvard Kennedy School.

In 2018, Aribam was selected for the inaugural cohort of the prestigious VVEngage Fellowship. VVEngage Fellowship is a Vital Voices programme that focuses on advancing women's public leadership. VVEngage Fellows participate in a rigorous online and in-person training, connecting with a global network of peers and mentors. During the programme, she received mentorship from former prime ministers Beatriz Merino of Peru, Jenny Shipley of New Zealand, and Kim Campbell of Canada. Professors of Harvard Kennedy School, amongst others, trained Aribam during the fellowship.

=== Vogue India Beauty Feature ===
For its 2020 anniversary issue, Vogue India featured 7 women from North-East India in its beauty edit. Aribam shared her beauty rituals and secret. She said, "In my experience, the one ‘beauty tool’ that you can never go wrong with is self-confidence. So wear it always".

=== ACYPL-US State Department Exchange Delegate ===
Aribam was selected as a delegate for the American Council of Young Political Leaders Exchange Program in collaboration with the United States government's State Department. In January–February 2020, she observed election rallies of two presidential candidates including that of Joe Biden, observed a caucus in Iowa, and was introduced in the Iowa Senate.

=== Top 10 Successful Indians Under 30 ===
In 2018, Aribam was featured by Eastern Eye, a British newspaper, as amongst the top 10 successful Indians under 30.

=== Women from the Northeast ===
SheThePeopleTv included Aribam in a list of seven women which the north-eastern region of India is proud of.
