= 2014 in Indian sports =

The 2014 in Indian sports was held across the Indian cities all through the season.

== Events ==
=== January ===
- 30 December – 5 January: 2014 Aircel Chennai Open was scheduled. Stanislas Wawrinka of Switzerland beat Frenchman Édouard Roger-Vasselin by 7–5, 6–2 in men's singles final and became the champion and in the men's doubles final Sweden's Johan Brunström and Frederik Nielsen of Denmark beat the Croatian pair Marin Draganja and Mate Pavić 6–2, 4–6, [10–7].
- 10–18 January: 2012–14 Men's FIH Hockey World League Final was held at Dhyan Chand National Stadium, Delhi. The Dutch hockey team beat the Black Stick Men 7–2 in the final.
- 18–29 January: 2014 Lusophony Games was held in Goa, India. Host India ended up on first place with 37 Gold, 27 Silver and 28 Bronze followed by Portugal with 18 Gold, 20 Silver and 12 Bronze and Macau on third place with 15 Gold, 9 Silver and 14 Bronze.
- 21–26 January: 2014 India Open Grand Prix Gold was held at Babu Banarasi Das Indoor Stadium in Lucknow.

=== February ===
- 23 January – 23 February: 2014 Hockey India League is scheduled. Kalinga Lancers was the debuting team. Delhi Waveriders became the champions by beating Jaypee Punjab Warriors. The scores were leveled at 3–3 but Delhi took the game in penalties 3–1. Defending champions Ranchi Rhinos ended up 3rd after beating Uttar Pradesh Wizards 3–2 in penalties after the game was drawn 1–1.
- 31 January – 2 February: 2014 Davis Cup Asia/Oceania Zone Group I first round match India vs Chinese Taipei was played at Indore, India winning 5–0.
- 2 February: 2013–14 Ranji Trophy final was scheduled to end. Karnataka won the match by 7 wickets by beating Maharashtra.
- 7–11 February: First round of I-League 2nd Division was held. Royal Wahingdoh F.C. and Kalighat Milan Sangha FC made to final round from group A and Bhawanipore F.C. and Hindustan F.C. made it to final round from group B

=== March ===
- 23 March – 11 April: I-League 2nd Division final round was held. Royal Wahingdoh F.C. won the round and advanced to 2014–15 I-League 1st Division.

=== April ===
- 1–6 April: 2014 India Super Series was held at Siri Fort Indoor Stadium, New Delhi.
- 16 April – 1 June: 2014 Indian Premier League is scheduled.
- 22 April: Chitra Magimairaj won the World Women's Senior Snooker Championship on 22 April 2014 at Leeds, United Kingdom.
- 30 April: Last match of 2014 Indian Premier League will be played in the United Arab Emirates. The remaining season will return to India.

=== May ===
- 2 May: 2014 Indian Premier League returns to India.
- 18 May: 2013–14 I-League matches ends.
- 18–25 May: Thomas cup and Uber cup of Badminton were scheduled in New Delhi. Japan and China won Thomas and Uber Cups, respectively.

=== June ===
- 1 June: 2014 Indian Premier League final match was held at M. Chinnaswamy Stadium in Bangalore. Kolkata Knight Riders beat Kings XI Punjab by 3 wickets to win their second title.

=== September ===
- 10–18 September: 2014 World University Squash Championship will be held in Chennai.
- 12–14 September: 2014 Davis Cup World Group play-offs will be held in KSLTA Tennis Stadium, Bangalore. India to face Serbia to qualify for group stage.
- 2014 Indian Super League will kick off.

=== October ===
- 30 September – 15 October: 2014 Indian Badminton League is scheduled.

=== November ===
- 2014 Indian Super League will end.

=== December ===
- 13–21 December: 2014 Men's Hockey Champions Trophy will be held at Kalinga Stadium, Bhubaneshwar.
- 2014–15 I-League season begins.

== Sports leagues in 2014 ==
=== National leagues ===
Game	Tournament	Winner	Tournament Length	
Game	Tournament	Winner	From	To
Association football	2013–14 I-League	Bengaluru FC	21 September 2013	18 May 2014
Association football	2014 I-League 2nd Division	Royal Wahingdoh F.C.	7 February 2014	11 April 2014
Association football	2014 I-League U19	Tata FA U-19	10 February 2014	29 April 2014
Association football	2014 Indian Super League	Atletico de Kolkata	September 2014	November 2014
Association football	2014–15 I-League	Mohun Bagan	December 2014	
Badminton	2014 Indian Badminton League	TBA	30 September 2014	15 October 2014
Cricket	2013–14 Ranji Trophy	Karnataka	27 October 2013	2 February 2014
Cricket	2014 Indian Premier League	Kolkata Knight Riders	16 April 2014	1 June 2014
Cricket	2014–15 Ranji Trophy	TBA	TBA	TBA
Field hockey	2014 Hockey India League	Delhi Waveriders	23 January 2014	23 February 2014
Kabaddi	2014 Pro Kabaddi League	Jaipur Pink Panthers	26 July 2014	31 August 2014
Tennis	2014 International Premier Tennis League	TBA	28 November 2014	13 December 2014

=== Continental leagues ===
Game	Tournament	Clubs			Total Clubs		Tournament Winners
Game	Tournament	Name	Qualified	Finished	India	Tournament	Tournament Winners
Association Football	2014 AFC Cup	(India) Churchill Brothers	2012–13 I-League Champions	Round of 16	2	16	TBA
Association Football	2014 AFC Cup	(India) Pune	2012–13 I-League Runner up	Fourth in Group H	2	16	TBA
Volleyball	2014 Asian Women's Club Volleyball Championship	N.A	(India) KSEB	Fifth in Group B	1	10	(Japan) Hisamitsu

== India in 2014 international sports ==
=== Multi-sport event ===
Event	Schedule		Medals				Finish	Athletes and Events	Report
Event	From	To	Gold medal	Silver medal	Bronze medal	Total	Finish	Athletes and Events	Report
(India) Goa Lusophonia	18 January	29 January	37	27	28	92	1st Place		Report
(Russia) Sochi Winter Olympics	7 February	23 February	0	0	0	0	Unranked	3 in 3 events	Report
(Scotland) Glasgow Commonwealth Games	23 July	3 August	15	30	19	64	5	215 in 14 sports	Report
(China) Nanjing Youth Olympics	16 August	28 August	0	1	1	2	64		Report
(South Korea) Incheon Asiad	19 September	4 October	11	10	36	57	8	515 in 23 Sports	Report

=== Association football ===
Clubs

- 2014 AFC Cup: Pune F.C. finished fourth in group H. Churchill Brothers reached knock out stage to round of 16.

International seasons

- 2013–14 in Indian football
- 2014–15 in Indian football

=== Badminton ===
Championships

- 2014 Thomas and Uber Cup was scheduled to be held in New Delhi, India.

=== Basketball ===
- 2014 FIBA Asia Cup in China. India finished 7th.

=== Cricket ===
Tournaments

- 2014 Asia Cup in Bangladesh. India finished on 3rd place after they lost to Pakistan and Sri Lanka in group stage. India was followed by Afghanistan on 4th place and host Bangladesh on last place, i.e. 5th place. Sri Lanka won the tournament by beating Pakistan in the final match.
- 2014 ICC World Twenty20 in Bangladesh. India was unbeaten till semi-final match when they evolved and the deserving champions. But Sri Lanka beat India in final to win the world T20 champions title. India eventually finished as runners-up.
- 2014 ICC Women's World Twenty20 in Bangladesh. India finished 3rd in group stage. India played Pakistan in 2016 ICC Women's World Twenty20 Qualification playoff where India beat Pakistan and qualified for 2016 ICC Women's World Twenty20 scheduled to take place in India.

Tours

- India faced New Zealand. India lost four out of five ODIs and one out of two test matches losing One Day series 4–0 and Test series 1–0 to New Zealand Black Caps (Kiwis) which are a comparatively weaker team to India.
- India will face England

=== Field hockey ===
Tournaments

- 2012–14 Men's FIH Hockey World League Final in New Delhi, India was won by the Netherlands. India ended up on sixth position after losing to Belgium 2–1.
- 2014 Men's Hockey World Cup in The Hague, Netherlands.
- 2014 Men's Hockey Champions Trophy in Bhubaneshwar, India.

=== Tennis ===
Grand Slam

Player / Pair	Rounds							Finished
Player / Pair	First	Second	Third	Fourth	Quarterfinals	Semisinals	Final	Finished
2014 Australian Open
Men's singles
(India) Somdev Devvarman	Lost 4–6, 4–6, 6(2)-7(7) (Spain) Feliciano López	DNA						First round
Boys' singles
(India) Sumit Nagal	Lost 3–6, 3–6 (Australia) Harry Bourchier	DNA		NA	DNA			First round
Girls' singles
(India) Snehadevi Reddy	Lost 4–6, 0–6 (China) Zhang Ying	DNA		NA	DNA			First round
(India) Simran Kaur Sethi	Lost 4–6, 2–6 (Australia) Destanee Aiava	DNA		NA	DNA			First round
(India) Dhruthi Tatachar Venugopal	Lost 3–6, 3–6 (United Kingdom) Katie Boulter	DNA		NA	DNA			First round
Men's doubles
(India) Rohan Bopanna (Pakistan) Aisam-ul-Haq Qureshi	Won 6–3, 4–6, 7(7)-6(5) (Australia) Rameez Junaid (France) Adrian Mannarino	Won 4–6, 6–3, 6–2 (United Kingdom) Colin Fleming (United Kingdom) Ross Hutchins	Lost 4–6, 6(1)-7(7) (Philippines) Treat Conrad Huey (United Kingdom) Dominic Inglot	NA	DNA			Third round
(Chinese Taipei) Lu Yen-hsun (India) Divij Sharan	Lost 2–6, 4–6 (Sweden) Johan Brunström (Denmark) Frederik Nielsen	DNA		NA	DNA			First round
(India) Leander Paes (Czech Republic) Radek Štěpánek	Won 6–4, 6–1 (Czech Republic) Lukáš Rosol (Czech Republic) Lukáš Dlouhý	Won 6–1, 6–4 (Italy) Daniele Bracciali (Ukraine) Alexandr Dolgopolov	Won 6–3, 6–2 (India) Yuki Bhambri (Australia) Michael Venus	NA	Lost 2–6, 6(4)-7(7) (France) Michaël Llodra (France) Nicolas Mahut	DNA		Quarterfinal
(India) Yuki Bhambri (Australia) Michael Venus	Won 6–2, 7–5 (Spain) Roberto Bautista Agut (Spain) Daniel Gimeno Traver	Won 6–4, 6–4 (Netherlands) Jean-Julien Rojer (Romania) Horia Tecău	Lost 3–6, 2–6 (India) Leander Paes (Czech Republic) Radek Štěpánek	NA	DNA			Third round
(India) Mahesh Bhupathi (United States) Rajeev Ram	Won 4–6, 6–3, 6–4 (Colombia) Santiago Giraldo (Portugal) João Sousa	Lost 4–6, 6(7)-7(9) (Peru) Alexander Peya (Brazil) Bruno Soares	DNA	NA	DNA			Second round
Women's doubles
(India) Sania Mirza (Zimbabwe) Cara Black	Won 6–1, 6–4 (Australia) Tammi Patterson (Australia) Arina Rodionova	Won 7–5, 6–1 (Romania) Monica Niculescu (Czech Republic) Klára Koukalová	Won 6–4, 6–3 (Canada) Eugenie Bouchard (Russia) Vera Dushevina	NA	Lost 2–6, 6–3, 4–6 (Italy) Sara Errani (Italy) Roberta Vinci	DNA		Quarterfinal
Girls' doubles
(India) Snehadevi Reddy (India) Dhruthi Tatachar Venugopa	Won 6–2, 6(5)-7(7), 10–5 (Japan) Nozomi Ohya (Japan) Yukina Saigo	Lost 4–6, 6(7)-7(9) (Ukraine) Anhelina Kalinina (Russia) Elizaveta Kulichkova	DNA	NA	DNA			Second round
(South Africa) Ilze Hattingh (India) Simran Kaur Sethi	Lost 6(2)-7(7), 7(9)-6(7), [3–10] (United States) Michaela Gordon (United States) Katrine Steffensen	DNA		NA	DNA			First round
Mixed doubles
(India) Sania Mirza (Romania) Horia Tecău	Won 6–1, 6–4 (Chinese Taipei) Chan Hao-ching (Sweden) Robert Lindstedt	Won 6–2, 6–2 (Australia) Anastasia Rodionova (United Kingdom) Colin Fleming	NA		Won 6–3, 6–4 (Germany) Julia Görges (Pakistan) Aisam-ul-Haq Qureshi	Won 2–6, 6–3, [10–2] (Australia) Jarmila Gajdošová (Australia) Matthew Ebden	Lost 3–6, 2–6 (France) Kristina Mladenovic (Canada) Daniel Nestor	Runners-up
(Slovakia) Daniela Hantuchová (India) Leander Paes	Won 7–5, 4–6, [10–7] (Croatia) Ajla Tomljanović (Australia) James Duckworth	Won 6–0, 2–6, [10–6] (Russia) Elena Vesnina (India) Mahesh Bhupathi	NA		Lost 3–6, 3–6 (France) Kristina Mladenovic (Canada) Daniel Nestor	DNA		Quarterfinal
(Russia) Elena Vesnina (India) Mahesh Bhupathi	Won 6(3)-7(7), 6–4, 10–5 (Spain) Arantxa Parra Santonja (Spain) David Marrero	Lost 0–6, 6–2, 6–10 (Slovakia) Daniela Hantuchová (India) Leander Paes	NA		DNA			Second round
(Slovenia) Katarina Srebotnik (India) Rohan Bopanna	Won 6–2, 6–3 (United States) Raquel Kops-Jones (Philippines) Treat Huey	Won 7(7)-6(5), 7–5 (Australia) Ashleigh Barty (Australia) John Peers	NA		Lost 5–7, 3–6 (Australia) Jarmila Gajdošová (Australia) Matthew Ebden	DNA		Quarterfinal

Championships

- 2014 Davis Cup Asia/Oceania Zone Group I first round match India vs Chinese Taipei was held in Indore, India. Host India beat Chinese Taipei by 5–0.
- 2014 Davis Cup Asia/Oceania Zone Group I second round match India vs South Korea was held in Busan, South Korea. India beat host South Korea 3–1 to enter the 2014 Davis Cup World Group play-offs against Serbia.
- 2014 Davis Cup World Group play-offs match host India against Serbia. Winner will qualify for 2015 Davis Cup World Group.

== See also ==
- 2014 in India
