= Rubin Statham =

New Zealand tennis player

- Country (sports): New Zealand
- Residence: Auckland, New Zealand
- Born: 25 April 1987 (age 39) Westminster, United Kingdom
- Height: 1.80 m (5 ft 11 in)
- Turned pro: 2002
- Retired: 3 Jan 2025 (Nov 2024 last match played)
- Plays: Right-handed
- Coach: Gary Swinkels
- Prize money: US $421,623

Singles
- Career record: 31–29 (Grand Slam, ATP Tour level, and Davis Cup)
- Career titles: 0
- Highest ranking: No. 279 (25 February 2013)

Grand Slam singles results
- US Open: Q1 (2016)

Doubles
- Career record: 2–13 (Grand Slam, ATP Tour and Davis Cup)
- Career titles: 0
- Highest ranking: No. 139 (17 June 2013)

Team competitions
- Davis Cup: 28–19 (Singles 26-19, Doubles 2-0)
- Last updated on: 25 December 2025.

Rubin Statham (born 25 April 1987) is a former professional tennis player from New Zealand. He reached an ATP career-high ranking of world No. 279 in singles on 25 February 2013, and No. 139 in doubles on 17 June 2013.

== Personal information ==
Formerly known as José Rubin Statham, he was often referred to by his nickname of "José".

His twin brother Mikal (usually referred to by his nickname of "Oliver") is also a professional tennis player.

== Career ==
=== 2005 ===
In June 2005, Statham's second year on the professional tour, he made his first final at the Japan F8 tournament. He lost in the final to Go Soeda of Japan 4–6, 3–6. In November 2008, Kyu Tae Im of Korea defeated him 6–7^{(3)}, 1–6 in the final of the Malaysia F2 event. This was the second time he had made a final in over three years. In May 2009 Statham won his first tournament, at Australia F3, defeating Australian Greg Jones 4–6, 6–4, 6–1 in the final. In his next tournament, Australia F4, he lost in the final to Jones 5–7, 6–7^{(6)}. He won his next tournament in Egypt F7 by defeating Jean-Noel Insausti of France in the final 7–5, 6–2. He made it four finals in a row in his next tournament at Egypt F8, losing to Karim Maamoun of Egypt in the final 2–6, 2–6.

=== 2009 ===
In October 2009 Statham won another Futures title at Thailand F4. He defeated Roman Jebavý of the Czech Republic 6–3, 2–6, 7–5 in the final, having also won the doubles title the day before. He also won the Vietnam F1 title in the same month, defeating Amir Weintraub of Israel 6–7^{(4)}, 7–6^{(4)}, 6–1 in the final, and again made it a special event by winning the doubles as well. He did it again in Korea in May 2013. In October 2010, Statham was the only New Zealand representative in the Men's Singles at the 2010 Commonwealth Games and was the sixth seed. He lost in the quarterfinals to top-seeded and eventual champion Somdev Devvarman of India 3–6, 4–6.

=== 2019-2020 ===
In January 2019 Statham played the ASB Classic in Auckland, where he caused a major upset by beating the 6th seed and 25th ranked player in the world at the time, Hyeon Chung in straight sets 7–5, 6–3.

In March 2020, Statham's win in the World Group I play-off was his first competitive match for more than a year, a serious hip injury having caused him to retire from the first round of a Challenger event in Bangkok in February 2019. Other than purely domestic events, such as the New Zealand Premier League and Te Anau Invitational, it was the only match he played during the year.

=== 2023-2025 ===
At the 2023 Chengdu Open he reached the semifinals with Marcos Giron after the retirement of Marcelo Demoliner and Matwe Middelkoop and the subsequent withdrawal of Max Purcell and Jordan Thompson.

He entered the qualifying event in singles at the 2023 Astana Open as an alternate replacing Borna Gojo and reached the second round of qualifying.

Statham announced his retirement on 3 January 2025.

== Challenger and Futures/World Tennis Tour Finals ==
=== Singles: 26 (12-14) ===
Legend (singles) ATP Challenger Tour (0-0) ITF Futures/World Tennis Tour (12–14)	Titles by surface Hard (6–9) Clay (6–5) Grass (0–0) Carpet (0–0)

Result	W–L	Date	Tournament	Tier	Surface	Opponent	Score
Loss	0-1	Jul 2005	Japan F8, Tokyo	Futures	Hard	(Japan) Go Soeda	4–6, 3–6
Loss	0-2	Nov 2008	Malaysia F2, Petaling Jaya	Futures	Hard	(South Korea) Kyu Tae Im	6–7^{(3–7)}, 1–6
Win	1-2	May 2009	Australia F3, Bundaberg	Futures	Clay	(United Kingdom) Greg Jones	4–6, 6–4, 6–1
Loss	1-3	May 2009	Australia F4, Ipswich	Futures	Clay	(United Kingdom) Greg Jones	5–7, 6–7^{(3–7)}
Win	2-3	May 2009	Egypt F7, Alexandria	Futures	Clay	(France) Jean-Noel Insausti	7–5, 6–2
Loss	2-4	Jun 2009	Egypt F8, Ain Sokhna	Futures	Clay	(Egypt) Karim Maamoun	2–6, 2–6
Win	3-4	Oct 2009	Thailand F4, Bangkok	Futures	Hard	(Czech Republic) Roman Jebavý	6–3, 2–6, 7–5
Win	4-4	Nov 2009	Vietnam F1, Bình Dương	Futures	Hard	(Israel) Amir Weintraub	6–7^{(4–7)}, 7–6^{(7–4)}, 6–1
Win	5-4	Apr 2012	Vietnam F1, Ho Chi Minh City	Futures	Hard	(Australia) Nick Lindahl	5–2 RET
Win	6-4	May 2012	Thailand F2, Bangkok	Futures	Hard	(Indonesia) Christopher Rungkat	7–6^{(12–10)}, 6–3
Win	7-4	Jun 2012	Germany F5, Unterföhring	Futures	Clay	(Germany) Jeremy Jahn	7–6^{(7–3)}, 7–5
Loss	7-5	Aug 2012	Austria F4, Fieberbrunn	Futures	Clay	(Austria) Nicolas Reissig	4–6, 6–7^{(5–7)}
Win	8-5	May 2013	Korea F3, Daegu	Futures	Hard	(South Korea) Lim Yong-kyu	7–5, 3–6, 6–1
Loss	8-6	Aug 2014	Korea F10, Chuncheon	Futures	Hard	(Australia) John Millman	3–6, 7–6^{(7–4)}, 6–7^{(5–7)}
Loss	8-7	Aug 2014	Korea F11, Anseong	Futures	Hard	(Australia) John Millman	1–6, 5–7
Loss	8-8	Nov 2014	Australia F10, Wollongong	Futures	Hard	(United States) Jarmere Jenkins	4–6, 5–7
Loss	8-9	Mar 2015	Australia F4, Melbourne	Futures	Clay	(Australia) Jordan Thompson	1–6, 5–7
Win	9-9	Apr 2015	Australia F5, Mornington	Futures	Clay	(Australia) Matthew Barton	2–6, 6–3, 6–4
Win	10-9	Jul 2016	Usa F22, Pittsburgh	Futures	Clay	(Japan) Kaichi Uchida	6–3, 2–6, 6–2
Win	11-9	Feb 2017	China F1, Anning	Futures	Clay	(Italy) Marco Bortolotti	4–6, 6–2, 7–6^{(7–4)}
Loss	11-10	Feb 2017	China F2, Anning	Futures	Clay	(Chinese Taipei) Yang Tsung-hua	6–2, 4–6, 6–7^{(7–9)}
Win	12-10	Jun 2017	Thailand F1, Hua Hin	Futures	Hard	(New Zealand) Finn Tearney	4–6, 6–1, 6–1
Loss	12-11	Jul 2017	Usa F24, Champaign	Futures	Hard	(Germany) Dominik Koepfer	7–6^{(7–5)}, 2–6, 5–7
Loss	12-12	Dec 2017	Thailand F10, Hua Hin	Futures	Hard	(Russia) Alexey Vatutin	4–6, 4–6
Loss	12-13	Dec 2021	M15 Cancún, Mexico	World Tennis Tour	Hard	(Vietnam) Lý Hoàng Nam	4–6, 4–6
Loss	12-14	May 2022	M15 Chiang Rai, Thailand	World Tennis Tour	Hard	(Japan) Makoto Ochi	4–6, 4–6

=== Doubles: 70 (23 titles, 47 runners-up) ===
Legend
ATP Challenger Tour (4–11)
ITF Futures (19–36)

Outcome	No.	Date	Tournament	Surface	Partner	Opponents	Score
Runner–up	1.	6 February 2011	Burnie	Hard	(Australia) Marinko Matosevic	(Canada) Philip Bester (Canada) Peter Polansky	3–6, 6–4, [12–14]
Runner–up	2.	27 March 2011	Pingguo	Hard	(Finland) Harri Heliövaara	(Russia) Michail Elgin (Russia) Alexander Kudryavtsev	2–6, 3–6
Runner–up	3.	29 July 2012	Oberstaufen	Clay	(Russia) Andrey Kuznetsov	(Romania) Andrei Dăescu (Romania) Florin Mergea	6–7^{(1–7)}, 6–7^{(4–7)}
Runner–up	4.	6 January 2013	Nouméa	Hard	(New Zealand) Artem Sitak	(Australia) Samuel Groth (Japan) Toshihide Matsui	6–7^{(6–8)}, 6–1, [4–10]
Runner–up	5.	27 October 2013	Traralgon	Hard	(Australia) Dane Propoggia	(Australia) Adam Feeney (Australia) Ryan Agar	3–6, 4–6
Runner–up	6.	9 February 2014	West Lakes	Hard	(Australia) Dane Propoggia	(New Zealand) Marcus Daniell (United States) Jarmere Jenkins	4–6, 4–6
Runner–up	7.	15 February 2015	Launceston	Hard	(Australia) Adam Hubble	(Moldova) Radu Albot (United States) Mitchell Krueger	6–3, 5–7, [9–11]
Winner	1.	7 June 2015	Gimcheon	Hard	(China) Li Zhe	(South Africa) Dean O'Brien (South Africa) Ruan Roelofse	6–4, 6–2
Winner	2.	21 October 2017	Ningbo	Hard	(Moldova) Radu Albot	(India) Jeevan Nedunchezhiyan (Indonesia) Christopher Rungkat	7–5, 6–3
Runner–up	8.	19 August 2018	Gwangju	Hard	(Zimbabwe) Benjamin Lock	(South Korea) Nam Ji-sung (South Korea) Song Min-kyu	7–5, 3–6, [5–10]
Winner	3.	7 January 2023	Nouméa	Hard	(Northern Mariana Islands) Colin Sinclair	(Japan) Toshihide Matsui (Japan) Kaito Uesugi	6–4, 6–3
Runner–up	9.	8 April 2023	San Luis Potosí	Hard	(Zimbabwe) Benjamin Lock	(Northern Mariana Islands) Colin Sinclair (Australia) Adam Walton	7–5, 3–6, [5–10]
Runner-up	10.	22 April 2023	Cuernavaca	Hard	(Zimbabwe) Benjamin Lock	(Tunisia) Skander Mansouri (Greece) Michail Pervolarakis	4–6, 4–6
Runner-up	11.	14 May 2023	Busan	Hard	(Australia) Max Purcell	(United States) Evan King (United States) Reese Stalder	w/o
Winner	4.	6 January 2024	Nouméa	Hard	(Northern Mariana Islands) Colin Sinclair	(Japan) Toshihide Matsui (Australia) Calum Puttergill	7–5, 6–2

== Davis Cup (49) ==
With 33 ties, Statham holds the record number of appearances in the Davis Cup for New Zealand, his debut being in 2005. His 28 singles victories in those 33 ties is also the highest number by a New Zealand player.

In March 2020, Statham won against Brandon Perez in the World Group I play-off against Venezuela.

Legend Group membership World Group (0) Group I (10–17) Group II (18–4) Group III (0) Group IV (0)	Results by surface Hard (22–15) Grass (0–2) Clay (4–3) Carpet (2–1)	Results by setting Outdoors (13–10) Indoors (15–11)

- ▲ ▼ indicates the outcome of the Davis Cup match followed by the score, date, place of event, the zonal classification and its phase, and the court surface.

Rubber outcome	No.	Rubber	Match type (partner if any)	Opponent nation	Opponent player(s)	Score
▲4–1; 4–6 March 2005; MoreFM Tennis Park, Auckland, New Zealand; Group II Asia/Oceania first round; hard (i) surface
Defeat	1.	IV	Singles (dead rubber)	Kazakhstan	Alexey Kedryuk	4–6, 5–7
▼2–3; 23–25 September 2005; MoreFM Tennis Park, Auckland, New Zealand; Group II Asia/Oceania final; hard (i) surface
Victory	1.	V	Singles (dead rubber)	South Korea	Kim Sun-yong	6–4, 6–4
▲5–0; 10–12 February 2006; MoreFM Tennis Park, Auckland, New Zealand; Group II Asia/Oceania first round; hard (i) surface
Victory	2.	IV	Singles (dead rubber)	Lebanon	Wahib Maknieh	6–4, 6–3
▼2–3; 7–9 April 2006; Sports Complex Baganashil, Almaty, Kazakhstan; Group II Asia/Oceania second round; hard (i) surface
Victory	3.	IV	Singles (dead rubber)	Kazakhstan	Igor Chaldounov	6–1, 6–2
▲5–0; 9–11 February 2007; Edgar Centre, Dunedin, New Zealand; Group II Asia/Oceania first round; carpet (i) surface
Victory	4.	IV	Singles (dead rubber)	Pacific Oceania	Juan Sebastien Langton	7–6^{(7–4)}, 6–1
▼1–4; 6–8 April 2007; Parnell Tennis Club, Auckland, New Zealand; Group II Asia/Oceania second round; carpet (artificial grass) surface
Defeat	2.	I	Singles	Philippines	Cecil Mamiit	4–6, 4–6, 4–6
Victory	5.	V	Singles (dead rubber)	Philippines	Johnny Arcilla	6–2, 6–4
▲5–0; 8–10 February 2008; Sultan Qaboos Sports Complex, Muscat, Oman; Group II Asia/Oceania first round; hard surface
Victory	6.	III	Doubles (with Daniel King-Turner)	Oman	Khalid Al-Nabhani / Mohammed Al-Nabhani	3–6, 6–7^{(2–7)}, 6–3, 6–2, 6–1
▲5–0; 11–13 April 2008; Bassam Al-Motawa Tennis Center, Mishref, Kuwait; Group II Asia/Oceania second round; hard surface
Victory	7.	II	Singles	Kuwait	Mohammed Ghareeb	6–3, 6–2, 6–3
Victory	8.	V	Singles (dead rubber)	Kuwait	Ahmad Rabeea Muhammad	6–1, 6–1
▼2–3; 19–21 September 2008; TSB Stadium, New Plymouth, New Zealand; Group II Asia/Oceania final; hard (i) surface
Victory	9.	I	Singles	China	Bai Yan	4–6, 6–3, 6–4, 6–2
▲5–0; 6–8 March 2009; Albany Tennis Centre, Auckland, New Zealand; Group II Asia/Oceania first round; hard (i) surface
Victory	10.	I	Singles	Malaysia	Razlan Rawi	6–1, 6–1, 6–0
▼1–4; 18–20 September 2009; Philippine Columbian Association, Manila, Philippines; Group II Asia/Oceania third round; clay (i) surface
Defeat	3.	II	Singles	Philippines	Cecil Mamiit	4–6, 5–7, 2–6
Victory	11.	V	Singles (dead rubber)	Philippines	Vicente Elberto Anasta	6–2, 6–4
▲3–2; 5–7 March 2010; Sri Lanka Tennis Association, Colombo, Sri Lanka; Group II Asia/Oceania first round; clay surface
Victory	12.	I	Singles	Sri Lanka	Harshana Godamanna	6–4, 3–6, 4–6, 6–3, 6–4
Victory	13.	V	Singles	Sri Lanka	Rajeev Rajapakse	6–1, 6–0, 7–5
▲3–2; 9–11 July 2010; TSB Hub, Hāwera, New Zealand; Group II Asia/Oceania second round; hard (i) surface
Victory	14.	I	Singles	Pakistan	Aqeel Khan	6–4, 6–0, 6–0
Victory	15.	IV	Singles	Pakistan	Aisam-ul-Haq Qureshi	6–2, 6–1, 6–3
▲3–2; 17–19 September 2010; National Tennis Development Centre (LTAT), Nonthaburi, Thailand; Group II Asia/Oceania third round; hard surface
Victory	16.	II	Singles	Thailand	Kittiphong Wachiramanowong	4–6, 7–6^{(7–5)}, 6–1, 7–6^{(7–2)}
Victory	17.	V	Singles	Thailand	Sanchai Ratiwatana	6–1, 6–4, 6–3
▼2–3; 4–6 March 2011; Sport Complex Pahlavon, Namangan, Uzbekistan; Group I Asia/Oceania first round; clay (i) surface
Defeat	4.	II	Singles	Uzbekistan	Denis Istomin	2–6, 3–6, 3–6
▲5–0; 8–10 July 2011; TSB Hub, Hāwera, New Zealand; Group I Asia/Oceania relegation play-off, first round play-off; hard (i) surface
Victory	18.	I	Singles	Philippines	Ruben Gonzales	6–4, 6–4, 6–4
▼2–3; 10–12 February 2012; TECT Arena, Tauranga, New Zealand; Group I Asia/Oceania first round; hard (i) surface
Defeat	5.	I	Singles	Uzbekistan	Denis Istomin	1–6, 1–6, 3–6
▼0–5; 14–16 September 2012; CLTA Tennis Stadium, Chandigarh, India; Group I Asia/Oceania relegation play-off, first round play-off; hard surface
Defeat	6.	II	Singles	India	Vishnu Vardhan	2–6, 7–6^{(7–2)}, 4–6, 2–6
Defeat	7.	IV	Singles (dead rubber)	India	Yuki Bhambri	6–2, 5–7, 6–7^{(5–7)}
▼2–3; 19–21 October 2012; Kaohsiung Yangming Tennis Courts, Kaohsiung, Chinese Taipei; Group I Asia/Oceania relegation play-off, second round play-off; hard surface
Victory	19.	III	Doubles (with Daniel King-Turner)	Chinese Taipei	Hsieh Cheng-peng / Huang Liang-chi	3–6, 7–6^{(7–4)}, 6–1, 6–4
▲3–2; 13–15 September 2013; Plantation Bay Resort & Spa, Lapu-Lapu City, Philippines; Group II Asia/Oceania third round; clay surface
Victory	20.	II	Singles	Philippines	Johnny Arcilla	6–4, 6–2, 6–4
Defeat	8.	IV	Singles	Philippines	Ruben Gonzales	6–7^{(2–7)}, 6–4, 6–1, 5–7, 6–8
▼1–3; 27–29 January 2014; Tianjin Tennis Centre, Tianjin, China; Group I Asia/Oceania first round; hard (i) surface
Defeat	9.	II	Singles	China	Zhang Ze	7–6^{(7–5)}, 3–6, 4–6, 4–6
Defeat	10.	IV	Singles	China	Wu Di	7–6^{(7–5)}, 7–6^{(7–1)}, 3–6, 5–7, 4–6
▲4–1; 24–26 October 2014; Wilding Park Tennis Centre, Christchurch, New Zealand; Group I Asia/Oceania relegation play-off, second round play-off; hard (i) surface
Victory	21.	I	Singles	Chinese Taipei	Yang Tsung-hua	6–1, 6–2, 6–3
▲4–1; 6–8 March 2015; ASB Tennis Centre, Auckland, New Zealand; Group I Asia/Oceania first round; hard surface
Defeat	11.	II	Singles	China	Wu Di	6–2, 6–7^{(5–7)}, 6–7^{(0–7)}, 6–2, 3–6
Victory	22.	IV	Singles	China	Li Zhe	6–3, 6–4, 6–4
▼2–3; 17–19 July 2015; Wilding Park Tennis Centre, Christchurch, New Zealand; Group I Asia/Oceania second round; hard (i) surface
Defeat	12.	II	Singles	India	Yuki Bhambri	2–6, 1–6, 3–6
▼1–3; 4–6 March 2016; Olympic Tennis Courts, Seoul, South Korea; Group I Asia/Oceania first round; hard surface
Defeat	13.	I	Singles	South Korea	Hong Seong-chan	4–6, 3–6, 6–4, 6–7^{(6–8)}
Defeat	14.	IV	Singles	South Korea	Chung Hyeon	2–6, 4–6, 2–6
▲5–0; 16–18 September 2016; Wilding Park Tennis Centre, Christchurch, New Zealand; Group I Asia/Oceania relegation play-off, second round play-off; hard (i) surface
Victory	23.	I	Singles	Pakistan	Mohammad Abid Ali Khan Akbar	6–0, 6–1, 6–4
Victory	24.	V	Singles (dead rubber)	Pakistan	Samir Iftikhar	6–4, 6–1
▼1–4; 4–6 March 2017; Balewadi Sports Complex, Pune, India; Group I Asia/Oceania first round; hard surface
Defeat	15.	II	Singles	India	Ramkumar Ramanathan	3–6, 4–6, 3–6
Defeat	16.	IV	Singles (dead rubber)	India	Yuki Bhambri	5–7, 6–3, 4–6
▲3–2; 7–9 April 2017; ASB Tennis Centre, Auckland, New Zealand; Group I Asia/Oceania relegation play-off, first round play-off; hard surface
Victory	25.	I	Singles	South Korea	Hong Seong-chan	3–6, 5–7, 7–6^{(8–6)}, 7–6^{(8–6)}, 2–0 (retired)
Defeat	17.	IV	Singles	South Korea	Kwon Soon-woo	3–6, 2–6, 4–6
▼1–3; 2–3 February 2018; Tianjin Tennis Centre, Tianjin, China; Group I Asia/Oceania first round; hard (i) surface
Victory	26.	I	Singles	China	Wu Di	2–6, 6–4, 6–4
Defeat	18.	IV	Singles	China	Wu Yibing	6–1, 3–6, 4–6
▼2–3; 14–15 September 2018; Gimcheon Sports Town Tennis Courts, Gimcheon, South Korea; Group I Asia/Oceania relegation play-off, second round play-off; hard surface
Victory	27.	I	Singles	South Korea	Hong Seong-chan	7–6^{(12–10)}, 6–2
Defeat	19.	IV	Singles	South Korea	Lee Duck-hee	4–6, 1–6
▲3–1; 6–7 March 2020; ASB Tennis Centre, Auckland, New Zealand; World Group I play-off, play-off round; hard surface
Victory	28.	IV	Singles	Venezuela	Brandon Perez	6–2, 6–7^{(3–7)}, 4–1 (retired)
▼1–3; 18–19 September 2021; International Tennis Hall of Fame, Newport, Rhode Island, USA; World Group I; grass surface
Defeat	20.	I	Singles	South Korea	Nam Ji-sung	2–6, 2–6
Defeat	21.	IV	Singles	South Korea	Kwon Soon-woo	3–6, 3–6
