= Bargarh Main Canal =

Bargarh main canal is the main section of the Hirakud Dam starting at right bank of the dam, near Burla. This canal releases 4,000 cubic feet per second (110 m^{3}/s) of water for irrigation and industrial usage.

The main canal then splits into two parts. The minor part traverses from Katapali towards Bargarh town and further towards Bheden block. Main part of the canal goes straight towards Barpali, Sonepur and Bolangir. Bheden block is known to be the "tail" area of the canal and often faces shortage of water from the irrigation system.

== Construction ==
The construction of this canal system began during construction of Hirakud Dam in late 1950s. It now irrigates in three districts of Bargarh, Bolangir and Sonepur. The area under irrigation during summer and winter varies.

=== Distributaries ===
1. Godbhaga Distributary
2. Attabira Distributary
3. Bargarh Distributary

== Corruption Charges ==
The first court case appears on 24 July 1956 between Lalchand Topandas Wadhwani vs State on 24 July 1956 with "Prevention of Corruption" act. The convicted were acquitted by the special judge.
