= 2015 Davis Cup Asia/Oceania Zone Group I =

International tennis competition

The Asia/Oceania Zone is one of the three zones of regional Davis Cup competition in 2015.

In the Asia/Oceania Zone there are four different groups in which teams compete against each other to advance to the next group.

== Draw ==
Second-round play-offs
Thailand	0
China	5

First-round play-offs
bye
Thailand
China
bye

First Round
1	Uzbekistan
bye
Nonthaburi, Thailand (hard)
South Korea	3
Thailand	2
Auckland, New Zealand (hard)
China	1
New Zealand	4
bye
2	India

Second Round
Tashkent, Uzbekistan (clay)
1	Uzbekistan	3
South Korea	2
Christchurch, NZ (indoor hard)
New Zealand	2
2	India	3

- Thailand relegated to Group II in 2016.
- Uzbekistan and India advance to World Group play-off.

== First round ==
=== Thailand vs. South Korea ===
Thailand
2
The National Tennis Development Center, Nonthaburi, Thailand
6–8 March 2015
Hard

South Korea
3

			1	2	3	4	5
1	(Thailand) (South Korea)	Danai Udomchoke; Lim Yong-kyu	2; 6	1; 6	6^{2} 7^{7}
2	(Thailand) (South Korea)	Warit Sornbutnark; Chung Hyeon	0; 6	5; 7	3; 6
3	(Thailand) (South Korea)	Sanchai Ratiwatana / Sonchat Ratiwatana; Nam Ji-sung / Song Min-kyu	6; 4	3; 6	5; 7	7^{7} 6^{3}	6; 4
4	(Thailand) (South Korea)	Danai Udomchoke; Chung Hyeon	4; 6	1; 6	1; 6
5	(Thailand) (South Korea)	Warit Sornbutnark; Nam Ji-sung	6; 4	6; 3

=== New Zealand vs. China, P.R ===
New Zealand
4
ASB Tennis Arena, Auckland, New Zealand
6–8 March 2015
Hard

China
1

			1	2	3	4	5
1	(New Zealand) (China)	Jose Statham; Wu Di	6; 2	6^{5} 7^{7}	6^{0} 7^{7}	6; 2	3; 6
2	(New Zealand) (China)	Michael Venus; Zhang Ze	6; 1	6; 4	3; 6	6^{3} 7^{7}	9; 7
3	(New Zealand) (China)	Marcus Daniell / Artem Sitak; Li Zhe / Zhang Ze	6^{3} 7^{7}	6^{4} 7^{7}	7^{7} 6^{1}	6; 3	6; 2
4	(New Zealand) (China)	Jose Statham; Li Zhe	6; 3	6; 4	6; 4
5	(New Zealand) (China)	Michael Venus; Wang Chuhan	3; 6	7^{7} 6^{2}	6; 4

== Second round ==
=== Uzbekistan vs. South Korea ===
Uzbekistan
3
Olympic Tennis School, Tashkent, Uzbekistan
17 – 19 July 2015
Clay

South Korea
2

			1	2	3	4	5
1	(Uzbekistan) (South Korea)	Farrukh Dustov; Chung Hyeon	7^{8} 6^{6}	4; 6	3; 6	6^{5} 7^{7}
2	(Uzbekistan) (South Korea)	Denis Istomin; Hong Seong-chan	6; 2	6; 2	6; 3
3	(Uzbekistan) (South Korea)	Farrukh Dustov / Denis Istomin; Nam Ji-sung / Song Min-kyu	6; 2	7; 5	7^{7} 6^{3}
4	(Uzbekistan) (South Korea)	Denis Istomin; Chung Hyeon	6; 1	1; 0				retired
5	(Uzbekistan) (South Korea)	Temur Ismailov; Hong Seong-chan	5; 7	6; 4	3; 6

=== New Zealand vs. India ===
New Zealand
2
Wilding Park Tennis Centre, Christchurch, New Zealand
17 – 19 July 2015
Hard (i)

India
3

			1	2	3	4	5
1	(New Zealand) (India)	Michael Venus; Somdev Devvarman	4; 6	4; 6	6; 3	6; 3	6; 1
2	(New Zealand) (India)	Jose Statham; Yuki Bhambri	2; 6	1; 6	3; 6
3	(New Zealand) (India)	Marcus Daniell / Artem Sitak; Rohan Bopanna / Saketh Myneni	6; 3	7^{7} 6^{1}	6; 3
4	(New Zealand) (India)	Marcus Daniell; Somdev Devvarman	4; 6	4; 6	4; 6
5	(New Zealand) (India)	Michael Venus; Yuki Bhambri	2; 6	2; 6	3; 6

== 2nd Round relegation play-off ==
=== Thailand vs. China ===
Thailand
0
The National Tennis Development Centre, Nonthaburi, Thailand
18–20 September
Hard

China
5

			1	2	3	4	5
1	(Thailand) (China)	Warit Sornbutnark; Zhang Ze	1; 6	0; 6	0; 6
2	(Thailand) (China)	Pruchya Isaro; Wu Di	6^{6} 7^{8}	2; 6	2; 6
3	(Thailand) (China)	Sanchai Ratiwatana / Sonchat Ratiwatana; Gong Maoxin / Li Zhe	6^{6} 7^{8}	6; 2	6^{3} 7^{7}	0; 1		retired
4	(Thailand) (China)	Pruchya Isaro; Zhang Ze	4; 6	1; 6
5	(Thailand) (China)	Warit Sornbutnark; Li Zhe	1; 6	0; 6
