= 2014 Andaman boat disaster =

2014 Andaman Boat Disaster
- Date: January 26, 2014
- Location: "Aqua Marine" (tourist boat), near Port Blair, India; 11.678°N 92.755°E
- Cause: Overloading
- Participants: Crew and 45 passengers
- Outcome: Boat capsized
- Deaths: 22

2014 Andaman boat disaster was an incident which occurred on 26 January 2014, when a tourist boat capsized near Port Blair, Andaman and Nicobar Islands, India, killing 22 people. The boat "Aqua Marine" was carrying 45 tourists from Tamil Nadu and Mumbai.

== Accident ==
The boat "Aqua Marine" was carrying 45 tourists from India from Ross Island, Port Blair Tehsil to North Bay when it sank and at least 21 people lost their lives. The capacity of the boat was 25 and overloading of the boat resulted in the tragedy. The boat sank at a distance of about 2.5 km from the shore of Port Blair and majority of the tourists were from Tamil Nadu. The administration of the Island group was busy with Republic Day of India and learnt the news at 4.30 p.m. on 26 January 2014. More than 29 people were rescued by district administration while one was still missing. Rescued were admitted to G B Pant hospital. The boat had no life jackets and there were no divers on board.

Reports say that two months before this accident, a tourist wrote a letter to the union tourism ministry about the lack of safety standards in Andaman islands’ tourism circuit.

== Aftermath ==
Andaman and Nicobar Islands administration announced a 100,000 Indian Rupee ex-gratia payment to the family of the deceased tourists. India's then Prime Minister Manmohan Singh and Tamil Nadu Chief Minister J. Jayalalithaa expressed their grief over the accident, while Jayalalithaa also announced a compensation of 100,000 Indian Rupees each to the families of dead. The owner of the boat and two others were detained by the law enforcement agencies for enquiry.
