= 2014 Hirakud boat disaster =

Maritime incident in India

2014 Hirakud Boat Disaster
- The incident occurred at Hirakud Dam in the Sambalpur district of Odisha
- Date: 9 February 2014
- Location: Hirakud Dam Reservoir, near Hirakud, Odisha, India; 21.57°N 83.87°E
- Cause: Overcrowding
- Participants: Crew and 115 passengers
- Outcome: Boat capsized
- Deaths: 31

The 2014 Hirakud boat disaster was an accident that occurred on 9 February 2014 in the reservoir of the Hirakud Dam in the Indian state of Odisha. The incident occurred when a boat carrying about 115 passengers on board capsized in the reservoir. The disaster killed 31 people.

== Accident ==
The accident occurred near the Pitapali area inside the reservoir at around 4:30 p.m. when a large group of picnickers were returning in an overcrowded motor boat. As per eyewitnesses, the motorboat became snagged, water overflowed the gunwale, and it capsized. The passengers tried to bale out the water unsuccessfully. Many of the passengers also jumped off the boat in panic. It was later noted the boat did not have basic safety measures.

== Rescue ==
Firefighters and units of the ODRAF were deployed for rescue operations. A six-member scuba diving rescue team also aided in rescue operations.
