= Bezbaruah Committee =

Indian committee

The Bezbaruah Committee, headed by M.P. Bezbaruah, Member, North Eastern Council, was set up in February 2014 after the death of Nido Taniam, a 19-year-old student from Arunachal Pradesh, who died in Delhi on January 29, 2014. The Committee's mandate was to listen to the issues raised by people from Northeast India living in other areas of the country, especially metro cities. The committee was also asked to suggest measures which could be implemented by the government of India. The Committee filed its report with Ministry of Home Affairs on July 11, 2014.
