= Mallikarjun Bande =

Mallikarjun Bande was an Indian police sub-inspector who served in the Karnataka State Police. He died after getting shot on head from point blank range during the gun fight between Gulbarga police and Munna darabar, a wanted rowdy sheeter and notorious underworld sharpshooter in Gulbarga, in which he too was hunted down. Bande's hospitalization and his eventual death drew considerable public attention and sparked intense socio-political debate in Karnataka and himself being scaled up to a heroic and cult figure among the public.

== Early life and career ==
He was born on 1 June 1974 and hails from a village called Khajuri in Aland Taluk of Gulbarga district. He started his career in Karnataka police as a Constable in 1997 and went on to become a police sub-inspector and worked in different parts of northern Karnataka. He did his schooling in Khajuri and graduated from SB College Gulbarga.

== Death ==
Prior to his death he was working as a PSI in station bazaar police station, Gulbarga. In an attempt to make a criminal called Munna Durbaar surrender, police team led by Bande surrounded Munna in his house.

During the gunfire Bande was shot in head by Munna. Due to severe injuries in the brain, he lost his life. He suffered multiple organ failures and was declared dead in the early hours of 15 January 2014.

During the treatment phase bande's family had requested the Karnataka government to shift him to Queen Elizabeth Hospital Birmingham for further treatment. Since he was not able to gain consciousness doctors avoided him to shift from Hyderabad hospital.

=== Aftermath ===
Government of Karnataka initially announced Rs.15 Lakhs as a compensation to the family of the Bande. Owing to the public pressure Government increased the total compensation to Rs.50 Lakhs which included the monthly salary that family would get till his retirement date as on papers.

His body was cremated in his native village Kajuri, Gulbarga district with Guard of honour by Police Department, Karnataka. Around 2000 police personnel were present during cremation to control huge crowd on the occasion and tension prevailed as people blamed district Inspector General of Police for his death. To control agitating people, who burnt public property like buses in protest, Government deployed more than 15 platoons of KSRP and 10 battalions of district reserved police in various places of Gulbarga district. Large number of public expressed their respect to the dead cop by observing total shutdown in towns like Gulbarga, Bidar, Humnabad, Aland and Surpur.

=== CID Probe ===
Opposition party of Karnataka demanded for Central Bureau of Investigation probe and Victim's wife along with a section of public staged protests for CBI probe. However Government of Karnataka ordered for Criminal Investigation and a detailed probe and report the same to government. Wife of slain Munna claimed that Munna had no gun and alleged that Mallikarjuna Bande would have died by a gunshot fired by police.

== In popular culture ==
The life and heroic death of Mallikarjuna Bande has attracted Kannada film makers who are going to produce a motion picture in Kannada.
