= Hirakud Dam =

Dam in Odisha, India

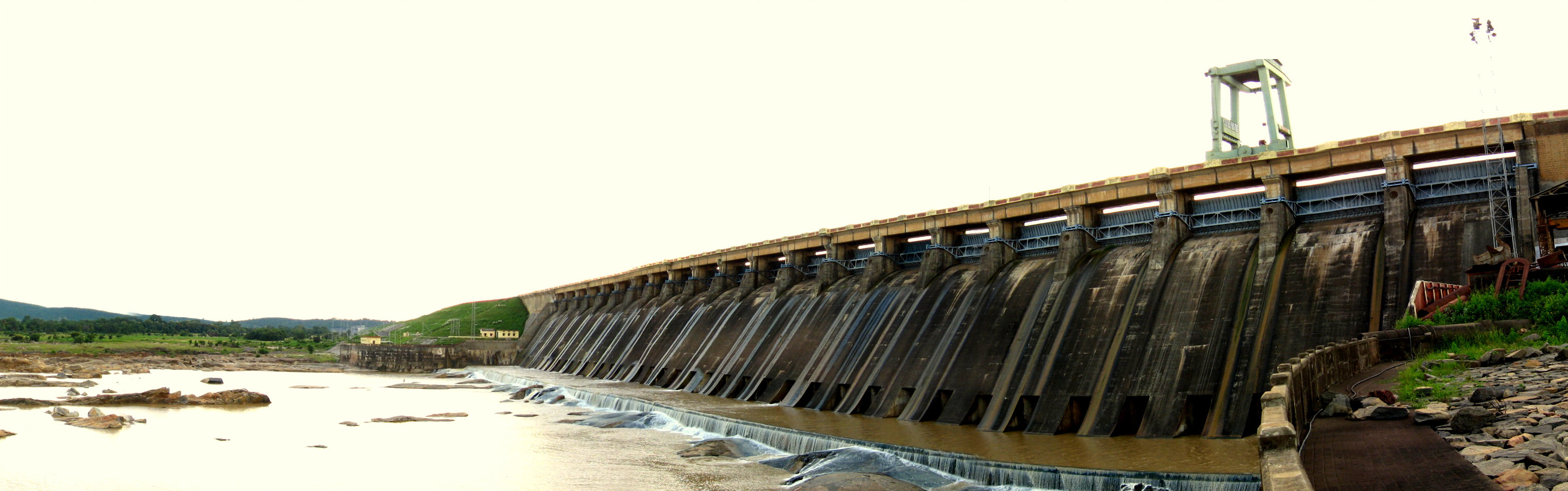
- Gates of Hirakud Dam

- Location within Odisha
- Official name: Hirakund Dam
- Location: 16.5 km from Sambalpur, Odisha
- Coordinates: 21.57°N 83.87°E
- Construction began: 1947
- Opening date: 1957
- Construction cost: ₹101 crore (equivalent to ₹120 billion or US$1.2 billion in 2026)

Dam and spillways
- Type of dam: Composite dam and reservoir
- Impounds: Mahanadi River
- Height: 60.96 m (200 ft)
- Length: 4.8 km (3 mi) (main section); 25.8 km (16 mi) (entire dam)
- Spillways: 64 sluice-gates, 34 crest-gates
- Spillway capacity: 42,450 cubic metres per second (1,499,000 cu ft/s)

Reservoir
- Total capacity: 5,896,000,000 m^{3} (4,779,965 acre⋅ft) (OR) 205.56 tmc ft (effective)
- Catchment area: 83,400 km^{2} (32,201 sq mi)

Power Station
- Turbines: Power House I (Burla): 2 x 49.5 MW, 3 x 37.5 MW, 2 x 32 MW Kaplan-type; Power House II (Chiplima): 3 x 24 MW
- Installed capacity: 347.5 MW

Designations

Ramsar Wetland
- Official name: Hirakud Reservoir
- Designated: 12 October 2021
- Reference no.: 2494

Hirakud Dam is a composite earthen dam built across the Mahanadi River, about 10 kilometres (6.2 mi) from Sambalpur, in the state of Odisha, in India. It is the longest earthen dam in the world. Behind the dam extends a 55 km (34 mi) long lake, the Hirakud Reservoir. It is one of the first major multipurpose river valley projects started after India's independence.

The dam was constructed as a multipurpose dam to control flooding in the Mahanadi delta, improve access to water for agriculture, and produce hydroelectricity for the region. Construction was started in 1946, with initial operations of electricity generation and pumping in 1956, before being fully completed in the 1960s. When the dam filled, it covered a number of villages displacing 22,000 people and covering 200 temples. The submerged sites are of some historic interest to researchers and divers.

Siltation has reduced the overall capacity of the reservoir 24% since its initial construction. Hirakud Reservoir was declared a Ramsar site on 12 October 2021.

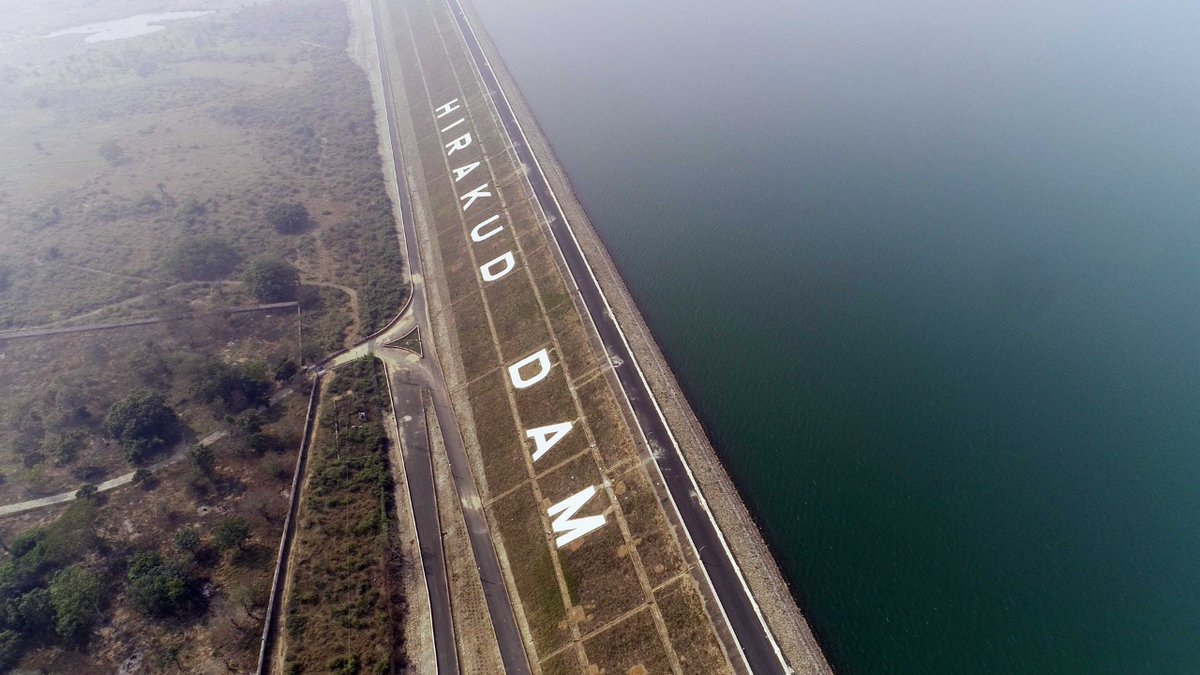
Bird's-eye view of Hirakud Dam

== Construction history ==
On 15 March 1946, Sir Hawthorne Lewis, the Governor of Odisha, laid the foundation stone of the Hirakud Dam. A project report was submitted to the government in June 1947. Jawaharlal Nehru laid the first batch of concrete on 12 April 1948.

In 1952, Mazumdar Committee was appointed by the government to oversee the soundness and technical feasibility of the project. The committee envisaged that the project would cost ₹ 92.80 crore and the construction of the main dam would be complete by June 1955. It also said that by 1954–55 a total of 1,347,000 acres (545,000 ha) of land would be irrigated and 48,000 kW of electric power would be generated. However, the dam was completed in 1953 and formally inaugurated by Prime Minister Jawaharlal Nehru on 13 January 1957. The total cost of the project was ₹1,000.2 million (equivalent to ₹110 billion or US$1.1 billion in 2026) in 1957. Power generation along with agricultural irrigation started in 1956, achieving full potential in 1966.

== Technical details ==
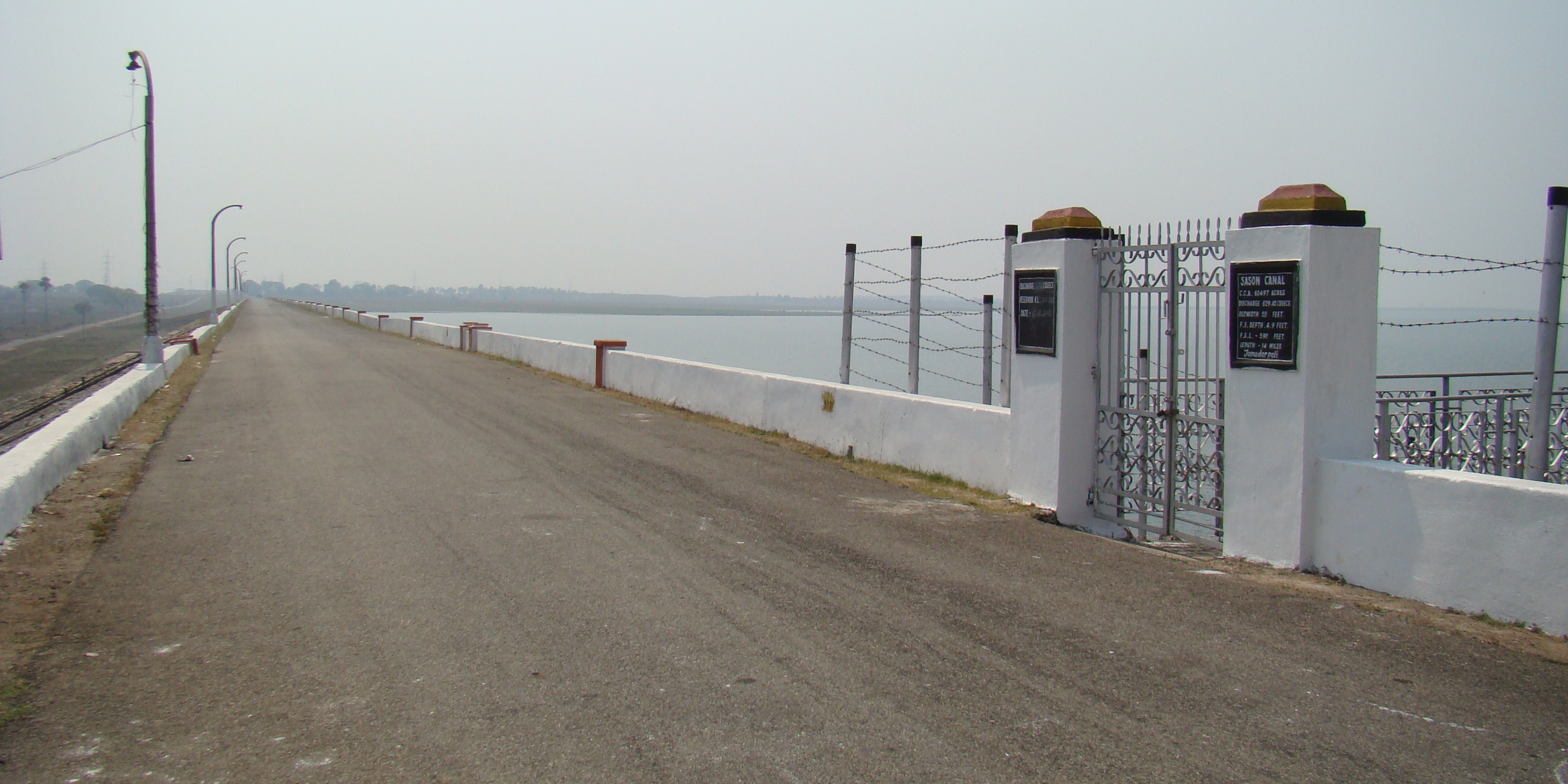
Dyke

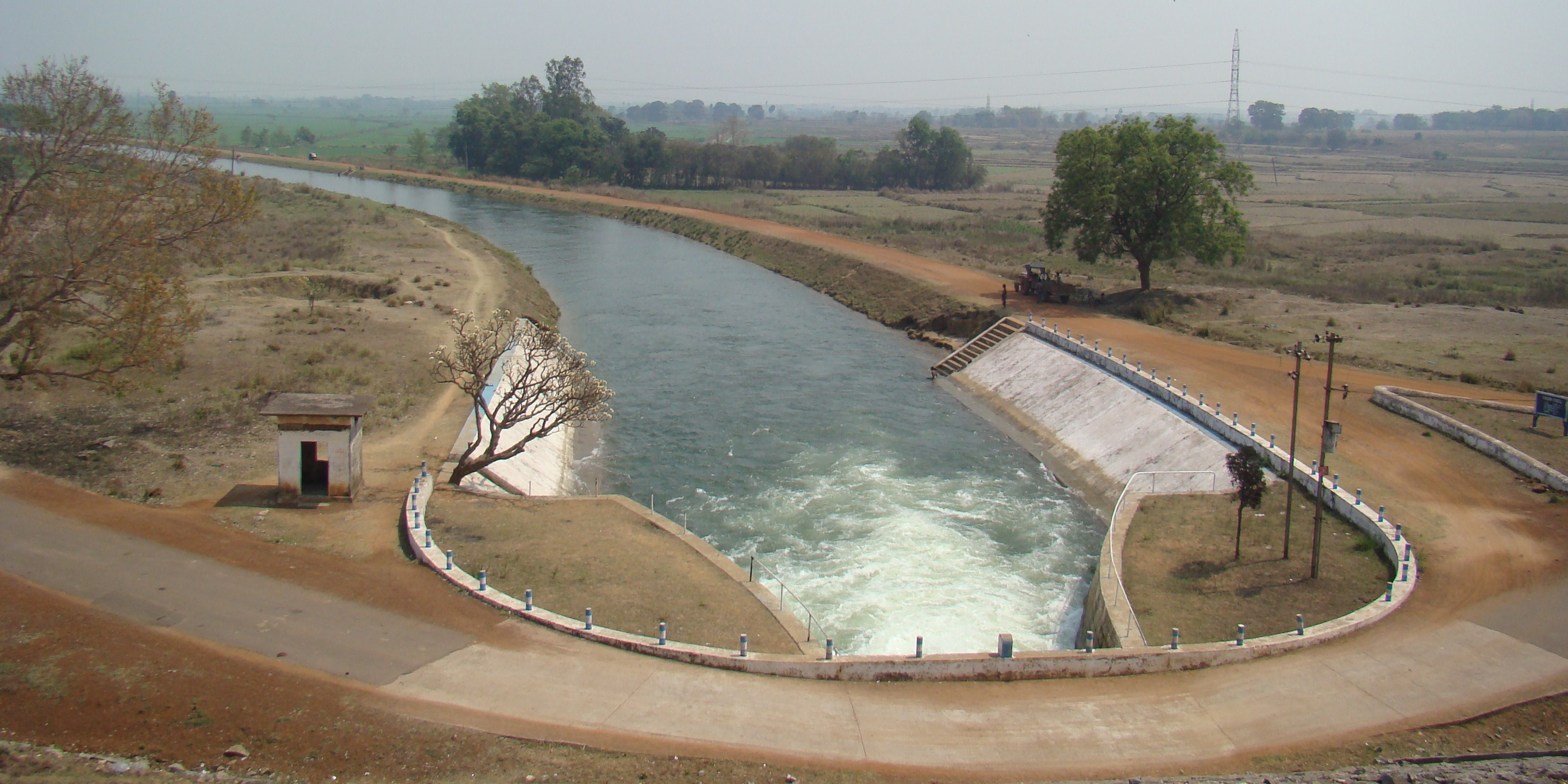
Sasan Canal

Technical Details
Total Length	25.79 km (16.03 mi)
Length of Main Dam	4.8 km (3.0 mi)
Artificial Lake	743 km^{2} (287 sq mi)
Irrigated Area (both crop)	2,355 km^{2} (235,477 ha)
Area lost in construction of Dam	596 km^{2} (147,363 acres)
Installed Capacity (Power Generation)	347.5 MW
Cost (in 1957)	₹1000 million ( ₹1 billion in 1957 or $0.23 billion with inflation)
Top dam level	R.L. 195.680 m (642 ft)
F.R.L/ M.W.L	R.L. 192.024 m (630 ft)
Dead storage level	R.L. 179.830 m (590 ft)
Total quantity of earth work in Dam	18,100,000 m^{3} (640×10^{6} cu ft)
Total quantity of concrete	1,070,000 m^{3} (38×10^{6} cu ft)
Catchment	83,400 km^{2} (32,200 sq mi)

== Structure ==
The Hirakud Dam is a man-made structure of earth, concrete and masonry. 10 km (6.2 mi) north of Sambalpur, it is the longest major earthen dam in the world, measuring 25.8 km (16.0 mi) including dykes, and stands across the river Mahanadi.

The main dam has an overall length of 4.8 km (3.0 mi) spanning between two hills; the Laxmidungri on the left and the Chandili Dunguri on the right. The dam is flanked by 21 km (13 mi) of earthen dykes on both the left and right sides, closing the low saddles beyond the adjoining hills. The dam and dykes together measure 25.8 km (16.0 mi). It also forms the biggest artificial lake in India, with a reservoir holding 743 km^{2} (287 sq mi) at full capacity, with a shoreline of over 639 km (397 mi). There are two observation towers on the dam one at each side. One is "Gandhi Minar" and the other one is"Jawahar Minar". Both the observation towers present extensive views of the lake.

=== Power houses ===
The dam supports two different hydroelectric power houses. Power House I is located at the base (toe) of the main dam section and contains 3 x 37.5 MW Kaplan turbine and 2 x 24 MW Francis turbine generators for an installed capacity of 259.5 MW. Power Station II is located 19 km (12 mi) southeast of the dam 21°21′10″N 83°55′00″E at Chipilima. It contains 3 x 24 MW generators. The entire installed capacity of the dam's power houses is 347.5 MW. Power House I and II were built in three stages. During stage I, four generators were installed at PH I and in stage II, the power channel two and Power House II was constructed. All three generators were installed at PH II along with two more at PH I by 1963. Between 1982 and 1990, the seventh and final generator was installed at PH I.

== Purpose ==
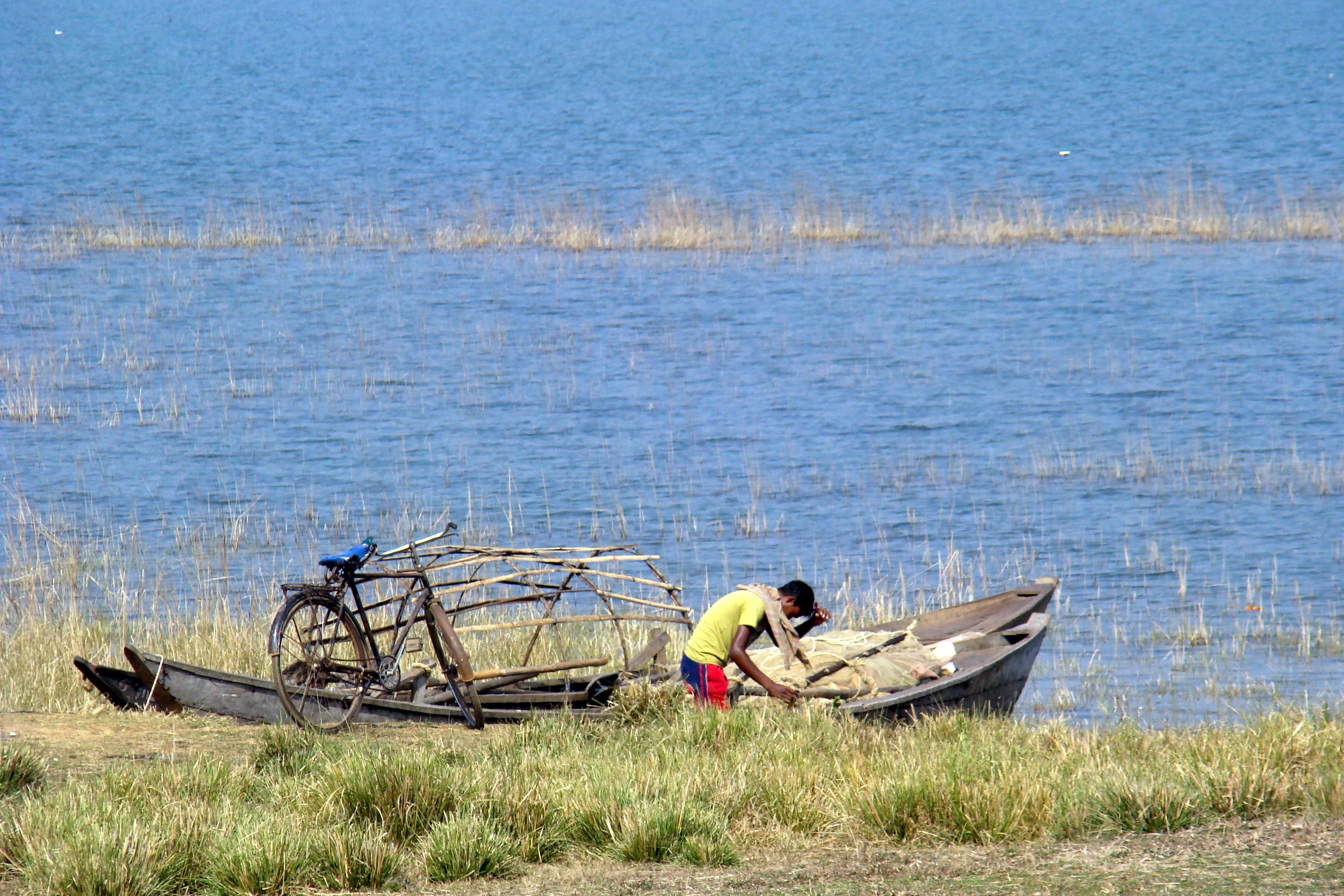
Fisherman at Hirakud Dam

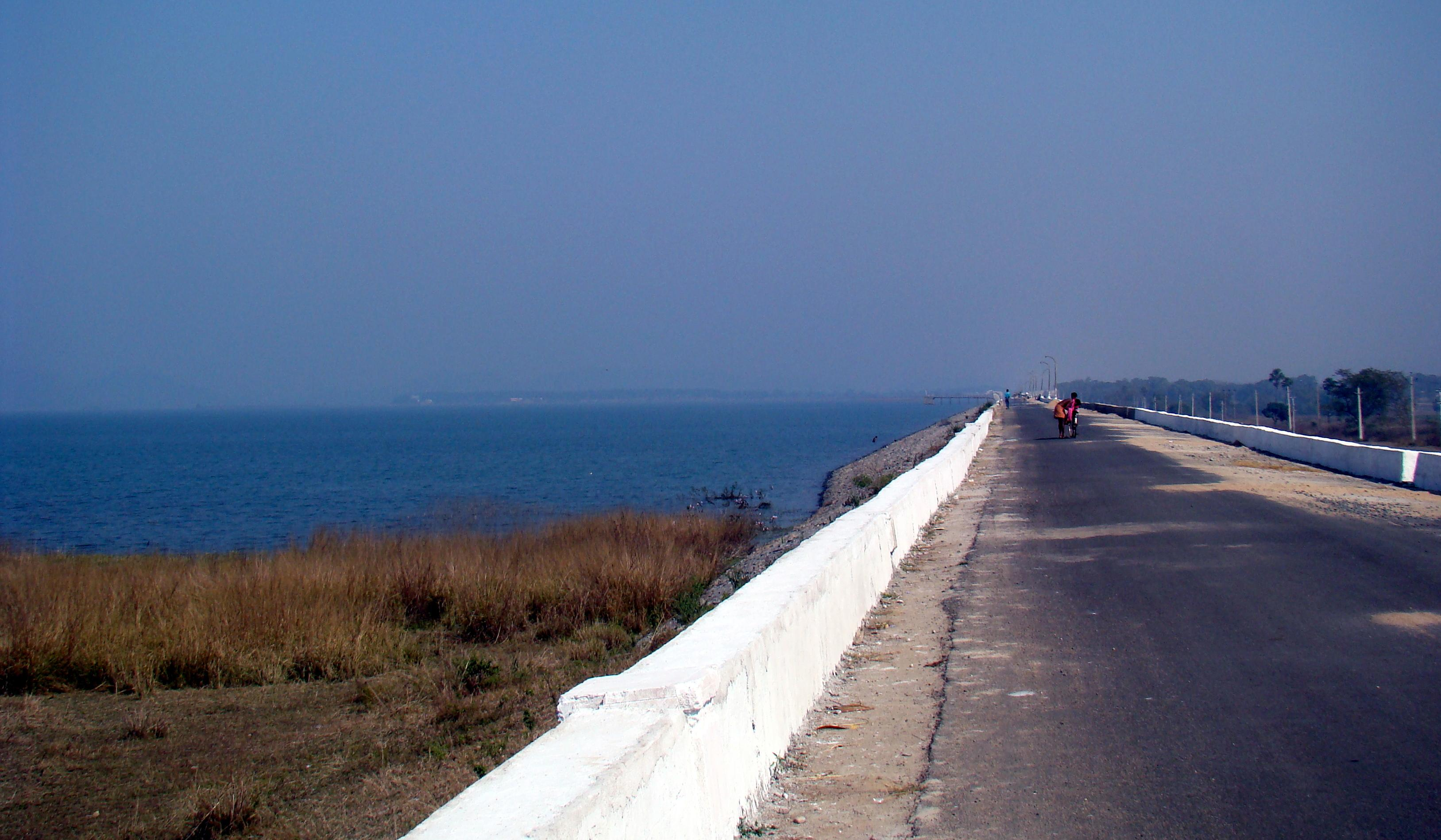
Left Dyke of Hirakud Dam

In the upper drainage basin of the Mahanadi River, centered on the Chhattisgarh Plain, periodic droughts contrast with the situation in the lower delta region where floods may damage crops. The dam was constructed to help alleviate these problems by creating a reservoir and controlling river flow through the drainage system. The dam regulates the flow of the Mahanadi River and produces hydroelectricity through several hydroelectric plants.

The dam helps control floods in the Mahanadi delta and irrigates 75,000 km^{2} (19×10^{6} acres) of land. Hydroelectricity is also generated. The Hirakud Dam regulates 83,400 km^{2} (20.6×10^{6} acres) of Mahanadi's drainage. The reservoir has a storage capacity of 5.818 km^{3} (1.396 cu mi) with gross of 8.136 km^{3} (1.952 cu mi).

It drains an area of 133,090 km^{2} (32.89×10^{6} acres), more than twice the area of Sri Lanka.

The project provides 1,556 km^{2} (384,000 acres) of kharif and 1,084 km^{2} (268,000 acres) of rabi irrigation in districts of Sambalpur, Bargarh, Bolangir, and Subarnpur. The water released by the power plant irrigates another 4,360 km^{2} (1.08×10^{6} acres) of CCA in Mahanadi delta. The dam can generate up to 307.5 MW of electrical power through its two power plants at Burla, on the dam's right bank and Chiplima, 22 km (14 mi) downstream from the dam. In addition, the project provides flood protection to 9,500 km^{2} (2.3×10^{6} acres) of delta area in district of Cuttack and Puri.

Chiplima has gained prominence as the second hydroelectric project of the Hirakud Dam. A natural fall of 80 to 120 ft (24 to 37 m) in the river Mahanadi is used to generate electricity. The place is mostly inhabited by fishermen, whose deity Ghanteswari is revered in the neighboring area. The state livestock breeding farm and agricultural farm are located here.

=== Canal system ===
Hirakud Dam has three canals, namely Bargarh Main Canal, Sason Canal and Sambalpur Canal. Bargarh Main canal has a water discharge rate of 4,000 cubic feet per second (110 m^{3}/s).

=== Industrial use ===
Water from Hirakud Dam at a later stage was allocated to various industries, primarily for mineral processing and coal fired thermal power plants in Jharsuguda and Sambalpur districts.

== Communities impacted by construction ==
The main purpose of the Hirakud Dam was to check the massive floods that were affecting a large part of coastal Odisha. But, the construction of the dam greatly affected the natives of the western part of Odisha. Nearly 150,000 people were affected by the Hirakud project and nearly 22,000 families were displaced.

In the original estimate, an amount of ₹120 million (equivalent to ₹15 billion or US$160 million in 2026) was provided for payment of compensation to the affected people. After revision, the amount was reduced to ₹95 million (equivalent to ₹12 billion or US$120 million in 2026) and the total compensation paid to the people was, in reality, only ₹33.2 million (equivalent to ₹4.1 billion or US$43 million in 2026). A large number of families were evacuated from their hearth and homes without compensation from 1956 onwards.

=== Lost temples ===
These are remnants of temples submerged after the dam was completed in 1957. In the summer season, the receding water of the dam makes the structures become visible. The hidden treasures have finally caught the attention of historians, and steps are being taken to understand the historical significance of these temples, which periodically go under water, only to resurface again. Many temples have been destroyed after 58 years of underwater existence. However, some remain intact.

Interest in these lost temples has been rekindled after two stones, etched with writing ('Shila Lekha'), were recovered from what is believed to be the Padmaseni temple of submerged Padmapur village. The temples located inside the reservoir area were part of the then Padmapur, one of the oldest and most populous in the region prior to the dam construction. More than 200 temples were submerged by the dam, nearly 150 temples have either perished or are underwater and about 50 are visible during summer. The lost temples present excellent opportunities for scuba diving enthusiasts to explore the underbelly of Hirakud Dam. The temple are visible to visitors on boat only during the summer months of May and June.

== Issues ==
=== Siltation ===
Statistics published by the dam authority show the water holding capacity of the dam has been reduced by 24% due to siltation.

=== Water conflict ===
A major conflict for water was reported when over 30,000 farmers gathered around the dam making a human chain, protesting against the allocation of water to the industries and there being no water for the canal system due to a low water level.

=== Inter-basin water transfer ===
There have been plans for inter-basin water transfer, as per plans of the water resource department of Odisha as part of India's ambitious Indian Rivers Inter-link.

== Ecological interest ==
The dam with the channel provides an ideal environment for the wildlife. The Debrigarh wildlife sanctuary is located here. Several species of migratory birds visit the reservoir during winter. Nearly 20-25 species of birds are seen in the reservoir and common among them are common pochard, red-crested pochard, great crested grebe and several others.

Hirakud Reservoir was declared a Ramsar site on 12 October 2021.

=== Cattle Island ===
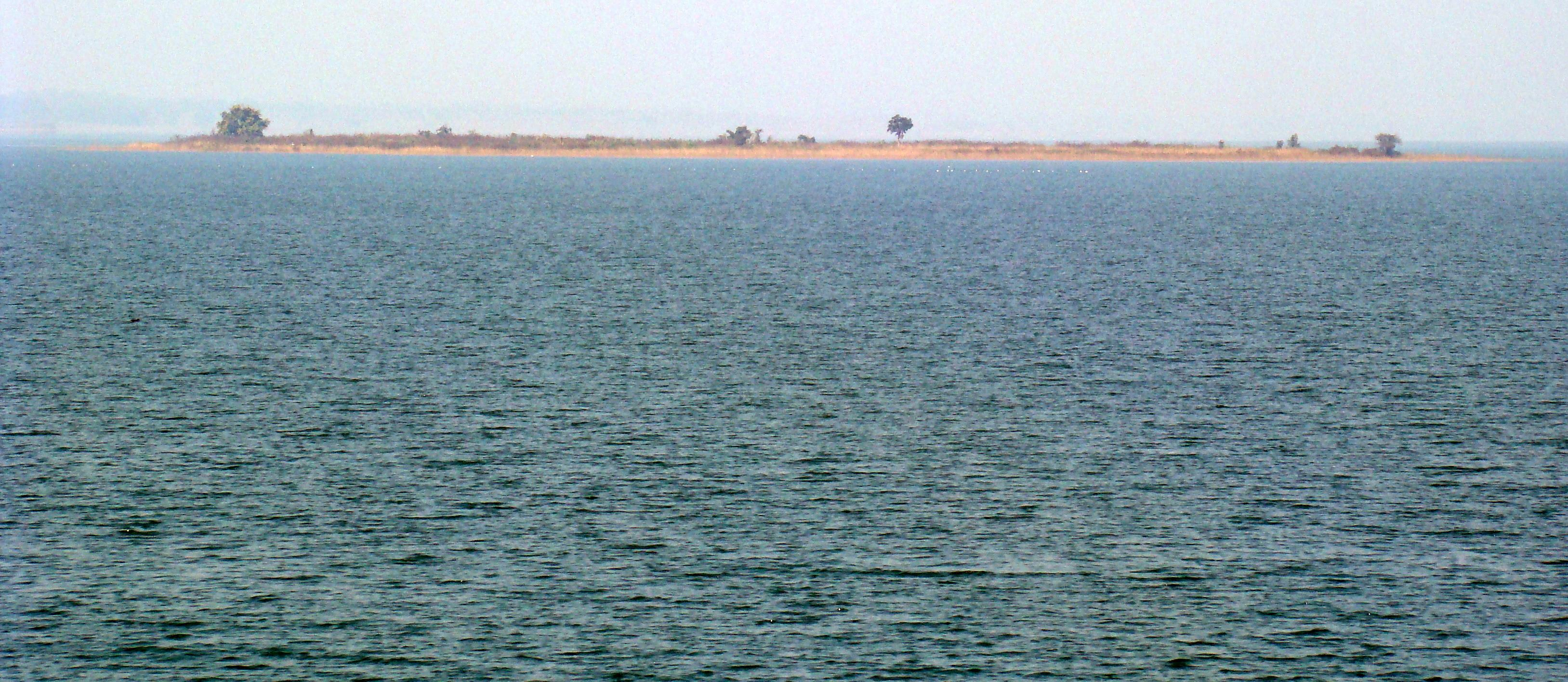
One of the many islands within Hirakud Reservoir

Cattle Island is located in one of the extreme points of Hirakud Reservoir, a natural wonder. Completely inhabited by wild animals, it is without any trace of humans. It is near Kumarbandh village of Belpahar-Banharpali range which is about 90 km (56 mi) from Sambalpur. It can be reached by launch from Hirakud Dam, it is closer by 10 km (6.2 mi) via the river. The island is a submerged hill, and before the construction of Hirakud Dam it was a developed village. During the resettlement period, villagers left some of their cattle behind; when the dam construction was over, the cattle settled on the hilltop.

With the passage of time the nearby area filled up with the reservoir water, turning the hilltop into an island. Being away from mankind, the cattle are now wild, very swift and not easily caught. Living on a hilltop with dense forest, they are larger than tame cattle, and almost all are white in color. Nearby residents attempt to capture these animals from time to time, but these hunts are rarely successful. Though descended from tame cattle, these animals provide a contrasting picture of this breed of animal returning to life in the wild.

== Stamps and notes ==
A commemorative stamp on Hirakud Dam was released on 29 Oct 1979 by the Department of Posts, with denomination 30 paise (0.31¢ US), 3,000,000 stamps issued. A hundred rupee note was issued on 26 December 1960 by RBI Governor H.V.R. Iyengar. The size of this note is 109 mm × 172 mm (4.3 in × 6.8 in). On the back side of this note there are thirteen regional languages along with an image of the Hirakud Dam and Hydro-Electric station.

Hirakud dam in Rs 100 note released in 1967

== See also ==
- Hirakud
- 2014 Hirakud boat disaster
