= 2014 Davis Cup Asia/Oceania Zone Group I =

International tennis competition

The Asia/Oceania Zone is one of the three zones of regional Davis Cup competition in 2014.

In the Asia/Oceania Zone there are four different groups in which teams compete against each other to advance to the next group.

== Draw ==
Second Round Play-offs
Christchurch, NZ (hard, indoor)
New Zealand	4
Chinese Taipei	1

First Round Play-offs
bye
New Zealand
Kaohsiung City, Taiwan (hard, indoor)
Chinese Taipei	1
2	South Korea	3

First Round
1	Uzbekistan
bye
Tianjin, China (hard, indoor)
New Zealand	1
China	3
Indore, India (hard)
Chinese Taipei	0
India	5
bye
2	South Korea

Second Round
Tianjin, China (hard)
1	Uzbekistan	3
China	2
Busan, Korea Republic (hard)
India	3
2	South Korea	1

- Chinese Taipei relegated to Group II in 2015.
- Uzbekistan and India advance to World Group Play-off.

== First round ==
=== China P.R. vs. New Zealand ===
China
3
Tianjin Tennis Center, Tianjin, China
27–29 January 2014
hard (indoor)

New Zealand
1

			1	2	3	4	5
1	(China) (New Zealand)	Wu Di; Michael Venus	3; 6	7^{7} 6^{4}	6; 2	1; 6	6; 3
2	(China) (New Zealand)	Zhang Ze; Jose Statham	6^{5} 7^{7}	6; 3	6; 4	6; 4
3	(China) (New Zealand)	Gong Maoxin / Li Zhe; Marcus Daniell / Michael Venus	3; 6	6^{3} 7^{7}	5; 7
4	(China) (New Zealand)	Wu Di; Jose Statham	6^{5} 7^{7}	6^{1} 7^{7}	6; 3	7; 5	6; 4
5	(China) (New Zealand)	Zhang Ze; Michael Venus						not played

=== India vs. Chinese Taipei ===
India
5
ITC Tennis Stadium, Indore, India
31 January–2 February 2014
hard (outdoor)

Chinese Taipei
0

			1	2	3	4	5
1	(India) (Chinese Taipei)	Yuki Bhambri; Yang Tsung-hua	6; 2	6; 4	6^{1} 7^{7}	6; 3
2	(India) (Chinese Taipei)	Somdev Devvarman; Chen Ti	6^{4} 7^{7}	7^{7} 6^{3}	1; 6	6; 2	9; 7
3	(India) (Chinese Taipei)	Rohan Bopanna / Saketh Myneni; Yang Tsung-hua / Peng Hsien-yin	6; 0	6^{3} 7^{7}	6; 3	7^{7} 6^{2}
4	(India) (Chinese Taipei)	Saketh Myneni; Yang Tsung-hua	6; 1	6; 4
5	(India) (Chinese Taipei)	Yuki Bhambri; Peng Hsien-yin	7; 5	6; 0

== Second round ==
=== Uzbekistan vs. China ===
Uzbekistan
3
Tianjin Tennis Centre, Tianjin, China
4 – 6 April 2014
Hard (Outdoor)

China
2

			1	2	3	4	5
1	(Uzbekistan) (China)	Denis Istomin; Zhang Ze	6; 4	4; 6	3; 6	6; 3	6; 4
2	(Uzbekistan) (China)	Farrukh Dustov; Wu Di	6; 1	6^{4} 7^{7}	6^{4} 7^{7}	6; 3	7; 9
3	(Uzbekistan) (China)	Farrukh Dustov / Denis Istomin; Maoxin Gong / Li Zhe	6; 4	6; 2	6; 2
4	(Uzbekistan) (China)	Denis Istomin; Wu Di	6; 1	5; 7	3; 6	5; 7
5	(Uzbekistan) (China)	Farrukh Dustov; Zhang Ze	6; 2	1; 6	6; 3	6^{4} 7^{7}	6; 3

=== India vs. South Korea ===
India
3
Spo1 Tennis Courts, Busan, South Korea
4 – 6 April 2014
Hard (outdoor)

South Korea
1

			1	2	3	4	5
1	(India) (South Korea)	Somdev Devvarman; Hyeon Chung	7^{7} 6^{4}	7^{7} 6^{3}	6; 4
2	(India) (South Korea)	Sanam Singh; Lim Yong-Kyu	6^{5} 7^{7}	4; 6	4; 6
3	(India) (South Korea)	Rohan Bopanna / Saketh Myneni; Lee Hyung-taik / Lim Yong-Kyu	7^{7} 6^{4}	5; 7	7^{7} 6^{2}	6; 3
4	(India) (South Korea)	Somdev Devvarman; Lim Yong-Kyu	6; 4	5; 7	6; 3	6; 1
5	(India) (South Korea)	Sanam Singh; Hyeon Chung						not played

== First round relegation playoff ==
=== Chinese Taipei vs. South Korea ===
Chinese Taipei
1
Kaohsiung Yangming Tennis Courts, Kaohsiung, Taiwan
12 – 14 September 2014
Hard, Indoor

South Korea
3

			1	2	3	4	5
1	(Chinese Taipei) (South Korea)	Jui-Chen Hung; Lim Yong-kyu	2; 6	2; 6	0; 6
2	(Chinese Taipei) (South Korea)	Chieh-Fu Wang; Hyeon Chung	4; 6	5; 7	2; 6
3	(Chinese Taipei) (South Korea)	Chen Ti / Peng Hsien-yin; Hyeon Chung / Lim Yong-kyu	7^{7} 6^{3}	3; 6	1; 6	7; 5	6; 3
4	(Chinese Taipei) (South Korea)	Chen Ti; Hyeon Chung	0; 6	6; 3	7^{7} 6^{3}	3; 6	0; 3	retired
5	(Chinese Taipei) (South Korea)	Chieh-Fu Wang; Lim Yong-kyu						not played

== Second round relegation playoff ==
=== New Zealand vs. Chinese Taipei ===
New Zealand
4
Z Energy Wilding Park Tennis Centre, Christchurch, New Zealand
24 – 26 October 2014
Hard, Indoor

Chinese Taipei
1

			1	2	3	4	5
1	(New Zealand) (Chinese Taipei)	Jose Statham; Yang Tsung-hua	6; 1	6; 2	6; 3
2	(New Zealand) (Chinese Taipei)	Michael Venus; Chieh-Fu Wang	7^{7} 6^{5}	7^{7} 6^{3}	6; 2
3	(New Zealand) (Chinese Taipei)	Marcus Daniell / Artem Sitak; Peng Hsien-yin / Chieh-Fu Wang	6; 0	6; 4	6; 2
4	(New Zealand) (Chinese Taipei)	Artem Sitak; Yang Tsung-hua	3; 6	7; 5	2; 6
5	(New Zealand) (Chinese Taipei)	Marcus Daniell; Jui-Chen Hung	7^{7} 6^{3}	7; 5
