= R. A. Padmanabhan =

Indian journalist and author

R. A. Padmanabhan (1917–2014) was an Indian journalist and a bilingual author who was the main avenue for a breakthrough on the identity of Subramaniya Bharathi. He started his career as a journalist at the age of 16 in a local Tamil magazine, Ananda Viakadan. He worked for various newspapers, dailies and magazines like The Hindu, Dhinamani Kadhir, Ananda Vikadan and The Hindustan. He also worked with All India Radio, Delhi. He received the Bharathiar Award in 2006 from the former Indian President Dr. A.P.J. Abdul Kalam. Dr. Kalam also launched the third edition of his magnum opus "Chitra Bharathi" on the same day. He died in 2014 at the age of 96.

In 2021, on the occasion of 100th death anniversary of legendary poet and freedom fighter Subramania Bharathi, Chief Minister M. K. Stalin announced 14 measures to honor his contributions to the society. The families of R.A. Padmanabhan and 4 other tamil scholars, who did research on Bharathi's life and works were honored with certificate and 3 lakhs each.

== Early life ==
Even as a child, Padmanabhan was interested in journalism and politics.

He was politically active in his school days. He organized Congress Meetings in Royapuram, Triplicane and in High Court, Chennai. He, in an interview, also stated how he and his friends used to not allow The Whites (The British) into their schools during working days. He said that all his Classmates would lie down near the gate for them to stop coming inside. he said "We used to get beat up like anything. We used to get our back wounded so badly that we would have to bunk school for the next few days!"

When he was in his SSLC (presently 10th grade), he penned stories to Ananda Vikadan. Then in 1933 he became the subeditor of the same paper, at the age of 16. At the time he was the youngest man to become a subeditor of any magazine.

Whilst in Vikadan, he was also in charge of the photographic department at times. His friend, S.R.Subramanyam, a Sarvodaya leader bought a rare photo of Bharathiar to Padmanabhan's office. To both Padmanabhan and to Subramanian's delight, Vasan and Kalki asked them to take multiple copies of the same photograph and send it to all newspapers and dailies of that time.

S.S.Vasan, the founder and editor of Vikadan, called Padmanabhan asking him to make a decision on whether to continue journalism and quit being a member of congress or quit his job and serve the congress on a bigger scale. Vasan also wanted to ensure that Padmanabhan did not take it as a threat and considered this a friendly advice. However, Padmaanabhan, without second thoughts, quit his job to be a politician. His friend Kalki, hearing the news, got furious and asked Padmanabhan to meet C.Rajagopalachari (Rajaji), who was the Chief Minister of Tamil Nadu then. Even after knowing why Padmanabhan quit his job, he advised him to undo his mistake and asked him to take up his job again. Padmanabhan, however, was firm and stood his ground. Rajaji tricked him by giving a recommendation letter and making it look like Padmanabhan came to him asking for him to recommending Vasan to give Padmanabhan his old job back. Padmanabhan, knowing how clever Rajaji was, opened the letter as soon as he left his house. After reading the letter, he decided that he would not give S.S.Vasan this letter as he considered this bailing his dignity for a job.

After a three-year stint in the Vikadan, Padmanabhan joined Jayabharati, a local daily. Its editor Mr. R. Narayana Iyengar, a full-fledged Swadeshi was the one who recruited Padmanabhan. Narayana Iyengar was so ardent a Swadeshi that his paper would advertise only for Swadeshi Products and nothing else.

On his third year in Jayabharati, when he and his colleague and best friend Kalki were fighting on whether Bharathiar was a Mahakavi (Great Poet) or not, where Padmanabhan said he was and Kalki opposed, he posed a question and answered the readers on who a Mahakavi was. "One whose work is timeless.. Didn't Bharathiar's work stand the test of time?" he quoted in the local daily.

Soon after this, he was offered two jobs as a journalist. The first on was from a few of his friends, Raali, Thumilan and R. Parthasarathy who had started their own and the first illustrated Tamil weekly called the Hanuman. He turned the offer down. After a few months, due to financial problems, the magazine had folded up. The second offer was from M.S.Kamath, who was the founder and editor of the English weekly, The Sunday Times, who gave him a job in its own Tamil weekly, The Hindustan. Fortunately, he took the job.

Bharathiar could also be called the reason for Padmanabhan to get the job in The Hindustan as M.S.Kamath was a huge fan of Bharathiar. His years in The Hindustan were fruitful. He had a better and a more educated audience, he was able to reveal a lot of information about Bharathiar to the world. "I set out to Puducherry (Now Pondycherry) to gather more information about Bharathiar fully geared with a Rolleiflex Camera" he said. He talked to a lot of people who knew Bharathiar and did a lot of homework. He had taken a lot of photographs, most of which took its place in the supplement in The Hindustan.

In 1939, he moved to All India Radio, Trichy, as a scriptwriter. He, being unhappy with AIR, quit his job in a year. "We, me and a few friends of mine, being unhappy with AIR Trichy's anti congress transmissions, put up a plan to sabotage their transmitter. As i worked in the Special Effects department, I knew to make a few animal sounds. The plan was that I bark like a dog to distract the guards while my friends went to the transmitter to break it down" he laughs. Finally with great difficulty, his family persuaded him to give up the plan.

== Works ==
- Chitra Bharati - Edition 1 (1957)
- Chitra Bharati - Edition 2 (1982)
- Chitra Bharati - Edition 3 (2006)
- V.O.Chidambaram Pillai - Biographer in English 1977
- V.V.S. Aiyar - 1980 (Tamil and English)
- Subramania Sivam - 1984 (English)
- Neela Kanda Brahmachari'- (English and Tamil)
- Tamizh Idhazhiyal Varalaru
- Rukmini Lakshmipathi (a biography) - 2001
