= Murder of Nido Taniam =

2014 murder in Delhi, India

Nido Taniam (c. 1994 – 29 January 2014) was a 20-year old student from Arunachal Pradesh who was murdered in the Lajpat Nagar area of Delhi, triggering widespread protests. Tania was the son of Arunachal Pradesh Congress legislator Nido Pavitra. At the time of his death, he was studying at Lovely Professional University, Jalandhar. He was beaten by shopkeepers for resisting.

== Background ==
Taniam had reportedly gone to Lajpat Nagar with three friends on Wednesday evening and was looking for an address. Shopkeepers at a sweet shop allegedly began mocking him, challenging his hair and ethnic origin. He died of severe lung and brain injuries from an attack inflicted upon him in a South Delhi market. The accused perpetrators are Farman (22) and Akram (27), who run the Rajasthan Paneer Shop.

== Probe ==
The initial post-mortem did not reveal "much injury or aberration". Tissue samples were retained for further examination to help determine the cause of death. Delhi Police registered a case of murder and arrested two men. The Bezbaruah Committee was set up by the Ministry of Home Affairs in the aftermath of this incident to gather information on issues raised by people from Northeast India who live elsewhere in India, especially in metro cities.

== Reactions ==
The incident attracted widespread protests and criticism from political parties and activists. Aam Aadmi Party spokesperson Dilip Pandey said. "The way police picked him up and then again dropped him to the same spot needs to be looked into".

Senior BJP Leader Arun Jaitley tweeted, "The death of a northeast student in New Delhi after being beaten up is barbaric and condemnable".

Minister of State for Minority Affairs Ninong Ering alleged that police did not file a complaint initially and said a compromise had been reached between Nido and the accused.

== Aftermath ==
In wake of this incident, 7 advocates from northeast were empaneled by Delhi State Legal Services Authority to provide free legal assistance to people from North-East India staying in the national capital.
