= Mrinal Das =

Indian trade unionist

Mrinal Das (14 January 1948) is an Indian trade unionist.

Mrinal Das was elected general secretary of the Bengal Provincial Students Federation in 1970. He also became a member of the all India secretariat of the Students Federation of India. Later Das became involved in trade union activism. In 1986 he was elected as one of the secretaries of the West Bengal State Committee of the Centre of Indian Trade Unions (CITU). He was also included in the national working committee of CITU, posts he would hold until recently. Das was known as a leader of the hardline tendency in CITU. He was a member of the West Bengal State Committee of the Communist Party of India (Marxist) for a time.
