= Tennis at the Summer World University Games =

- Events: 7 (men: 3; women: 3; mixed: 1)

Games
- 1959; 1960; 1961; 1962; 1963; 1964; 1965; 1966; 1967; 1968; 1970; 1970; 1973; 1972; 1975; 1975; 1977; 1978; 1979; 1981; 1983; 1985; 1987; 1989; 1991; 1993; 1995; 1997; 1999; 2001; 2003; 2005; 2007; 2009; 2011; 2013; 2015; 2017; 2019; 2021; 2025

Tennis has been a part of the Summer Universiade program since the games' first edition in 1959, with the exception of the 1975 Summer Universiade and again in 1989. The first change at the program was at the 1987 edition, when FISU decided to award two bronze medals for the losers of the semifinals, eliminating fourth place. The second change was in 2009, when the team competitions were included. Currently, seven events are played at Universiade. There are individual, double and team contests for men and women, as well as mixed doubles.

Past medalists include twice Grand Slam (2011 French Open, 2014 Australian Open) women's singles champion Li Na, 1978 French Open champion Virginia Ruzici, Grand Slam men's singles runner-up Nikola Pilić, doubles champions Fred McNair, Olga Morozova, Larisa Savchenko, Tomáš Šmíd, and Ion Țiriac, mixed doubles champion Rika Hiraki, 1984 Olympic runner-up Sabrina Goleš, 1992 Olympic bronze medalist, 1992 Olympic bronze medalist Leila Meskhi, and 2004 Olympic doubles gold medalist Li Ting.

== Editions ==
Games	Year	Host city	Host country	Winner	Second	Third
I	1959	Turin	Italy	Italy	France	Japan
II	1961	Sofia	Bulgaria	Yugoslavia	Czechoslovakia	Romania
III	1963	Porto Alegre	Brazil	West Germany	Italy	Czechoslovakia
IV	1965	Budapest	Hungary	Italy	Romania	United States
V	1967	Tokyo	Japan	Japan	Netherlands	United Kingdom
VI	1970	Turin	Italy	Soviet Union	Japan	France
VII	1973	Moscow	Soviet Union	Soviet Union	Japan	Hungary
IX	1977	Sofia	Bulgaria	Czechoslovakia	Romania	Soviet Union
X	1979	Mexico City	Mexico	Soviet Union	Romania	India
XI	1981	Bucharest	Romania	Romania	Soviet Union	Italy
XII	1983	Edmonton	Canada	United States	Canada	Soviet Union
XIII	1985	Kobe	Japan	Soviet Union	Romania	United States
XIV	1987	Zagreb	Yugoslavia	Soviet Union	Yugoslavia	Czechoslovakia
XVI	1991	Sheffield	United Kingdom	Japan	South Korea	United States
XVII	1993	Buffalo	United States	China	South Korea	Japan
XVIII	1995	Fukuoka	Japan	Japan	South Korea	Chinese Taipei
XVIX	1997	Palermo	Italy	South Korea	Chinese Taipei	Czech Republic
XX	1999	Palma de Mallorca	Spain	Chinese Taipei	South Korea	Czech Republic
XXI	2001	Beijing	China	China	South Korea	Mexico
XXII	2003	Daegu	South Korea	Chinese Taipei	Russia	United Kingdom
XXIII	2005	İzmir	Turkey	Russia	Chinese Taipei	Czech Republic
XXIV	2007	Bangkok	Thailand	Thailand	Russia	Chinese Taipei
XXV	2009	Belgrade	Serbia	Russia	Chinese Taipei	Serbia
XXVI	2011	Shenzhen	China	Thailand	South Korea	Chinese Taipei
XXVII	2013	Kazan	Russia	Russia	Japan	South Korea
XXVIII	2015	Gwangju	South Korea	South Korea	Chinese Taipei	United Kingdom
XXVIX	2017	Taipei	Taiwan	Chinese Taipei	Thailand	Japan
XXX	2019	Naples	Italy	Uzbekistan	Japan	China
XXXI	2021	Chengdu	China	Chinese Taipei	China	Switzerland
XXXII	2025	Essen	Germany	Japan	Individual Neutral Athletes	United Kingdom

== Results ==
=== Men's singles ===
Games	Gold	Silver	Bronze
1959 Turin	François Jauffret (FRA)	Pavel Benda (TCH)	Massimo Drisaldi (ITA)
1961 Sofia	Boro Jovanović (YUG)	Nikola Pilić (YUG)	Ion Țiriac (ROU)
1963 Porto Alegre	Bodo Nitsche (FRG)	Giordano Maioli (ITA)	Mitsuru Motoi (JPN)
1965 Budapest	Ion Țiriac (ROU)	Toomas Leius (URS)	Allen Fox (USA)
1967 Tokyo	Isao Watanabe (JPN)	Jun Kamiwazumi (JPN)	Hidesaburo Kuromatsu (JPN)
1970 Turin	Patrick Proisy (FRA)	Toomas Leius (URS)	Franco Bartoni (ITA)
1973 Moscow	Teimuraz Kakulia (URS)	Balázs Taróczy (HUN)	Kenichi Hirai (JPN)
1977 Sofia	Tomáš Šmíd (TCH)	Balázs Taróczy (HUN)	Vadim Borisov (URS)
1979 Mexico City	Vadim Borisov (URS)	Nandan Bal (IND)	Andrei Dîrzu (ROU)
1981 Bucharest	Florin Segărceanu (ROU)	Vadim Borisov (URS)	Andrei Dîrzu (ROU)
1983 Edmonton	Richard Gallien (USA)	Dan Goldie (USA)	Alexander Zverev (URS)
1985 Kobe	Alexander Zverev (URS)	Florin Segărceanu (ROU)	Kim Bong-soo (KOR)
1987 Zagreb	Bruno Orešar (YUG)	Igor Šarić (YUG)	Ģirts Dzelde (URS)
1987 Zagreb	Bruno Orešar (YUG)	Igor Šarić (YUG)	Mario Tabares (CUB)
1991 Sheffield	Xia Jiaping (CHN)	Francesco Michelotti (ITA)	Jeffrey Hunter (GBR)
1991 Sheffield	Xia Jiaping (CHN)	Francesco Michelotti (ITA)	Alessandro Pozzi (ITA)
1993 Buffalo	Shin Han-cheol (KOR)	Jeffrey Hunter (GBR)	Yoon Bok-kyu (KOR)
1993 Buffalo	Shin Han-cheol (KOR)	Jeffrey Hunter (GBR)	Zhang Jiuhua (CHN)
1995 Fukuoka	Yoon Yong-il (KOR)	Lee Hyung-taik (KOR)	Francesco Michelotti (ITA)
1995 Fukuoka	Yoon Yong-il (KOR)	Lee Hyung-taik (KOR)	Kotaro Miyachi (JPN)
1997 Sicily	Yoon Yong-il (KOR)	Pavel Kudrnáč (CZE)	Lin Bing-chao (TPE)
1997 Sicily	Yoon Yong-il (KOR)	Pavel Kudrnáč (CZE)	Alexander von Hugo (GER)
1999 Palma de Mallorca	Lee Hyung-taik (KOR)	Albert Portas (ESP)	Lee Seung-hoon (KOR)
1999 Palma de Mallorca	Lee Hyung-taik (KOR)	Albert Portas (ESP)	Slimane Saoudi (FRA)
2001 Beijing	Lee Seung-hoon (KOR)	Philipp Mukhometov (RUS)	Matthieu Amgwerd (SUI)
2001 Beijing	Lee Seung-hoon (KOR)	Philipp Mukhometov (RUS)	Lu Yen-hsun (TPE)
2003 Daegu	Lu Yen-hsun (TPE)	Igor Zelenay (SVK)	Matthieu Amgwerd (SUI)
2003 Daegu	Lu Yen-hsun (TPE)	Igor Zelenay (SVK)	Kim Young-jun (KOR)
2005 Izmir	Artem Sitak (RUS)	Evgeny Kirillov (RUS)	Sébastien Kosak (FRA)
2005 Izmir	Artem Sitak (RUS)	Evgeny Kirillov (RUS)	Jimmy Wang (TPE)
2007 Bangkok	Danai Udomchoke (THA)	An Jae-sung (KOR)	Charles-Antoine Brézac (FRA)
2007 Bangkok	Danai Udomchoke (THA)	An Jae-sung (KOR)	Chen Ti (TPE)
2009 Belgrade	Aleksander Slović (SRB)	Ivan Sergeyev (UKR)	Evgeny Donskoy (RUS)
2009 Belgrade	Aleksander Slović (SRB)	Ivan Sergeyev (UKR)	Artem Smirnov (UKR)
2011 Shenzhen	Lim Yong-kyu (KOR)	Teymuraz Gabashvili (RUS)	Sergey Betov (BLR)
2011 Shenzhen	Lim Yong-kyu (KOR)	Teymuraz Gabashvili (RUS)	Aliaksandr Bury (BLR)
2013 Kazan	Lim Yong-kyu (KOR)	Antso Rakotondramanga (MAD)	Konstantin Kravchuk (RUS)
2013 Kazan	Lim Yong-kyu (KOR)	Antso Rakotondramanga (MAD)	Maxime Quinqueneau (FRA)
2015 Gwangju	Chung Hyeon (KOR)	Aslan Karatsev (RUS)	Lucas Poullain (FRA)
2015 Gwangju	Chung Hyeon (KOR)	Aslan Karatsev (RUS)	Yang Tsung-hua (TPE)
2017 Taipei	Jason Jung (TPE)	Hong Seong-chan (KOR)	Nuno Borges (POR)
2017 Taipei	Jason Jung (TPE)	Hong Seong-chan (KOR)	Roman Safiullin (RUS)
2019 Naples	Tseng Chun-hsin (TPE)	Khumoyun Sultanov (UZB)	Lucas Poullain (FRA)
2019 Naples	Tseng Chun-hsin (TPE)	Khumoyun Sultanov (UZB)	Ivan Gakhov (RUS)
2021 Chengdu	Henry von der Schulemburg (SUI)	Kasidit Samrej (THA)	Jang Yun-Seok (KOR)
2021 Chengdu	Henry von der Schulemburg (SUI)	Kasidit Samrej (THA)	Sergey Fomin (UZB)
2025 Essen	Jay Dylan Hara Friend (JPN)	Toby Samuel (GBR)	James Connel (GBR)
2025 Essen	Jay Dylan Hara Friend (JPN)	Toby Samuel (GBR)	Alessio Vasquez (GER)

=== Men's doubles ===
Games	Gold	Silver	Bronze
1959 Turin	Takeo Hanna and Masao Nagasaki (JPN)	Günter Reimann and Klaus Wunderlich (FRG)	Michel Chevalier and François Jauffret (FRA)
1961 Sofia	Boro Jovanović and Nikola Pilić (YUG)	Fumio Akutagawa and Mitsuru Motoi (JPN)	Massimo Drisaldi and Stefano Gaudenzi (ITA)
1963 Porto Alegre	Bodo Nitsche and Lothar Pawlik (FRG)	Takeshi Koura and Mitsuru Motoi (JPN)	Giordano Maioli and Stefano Gaudenzi (ITA)
1965 Budapest	Dick Dell and Allen Fox (USA)	Toomas Leius and Sergei Likhachev (URS)	Petre Mărmureanu and Ion Țiriac (ROU)
1967 Tokyo	José María Gisbert and Juan Gisbert (ESP)	Takeshi Koura and Isao Watanabe (JPN)	Stefano Gaudenzi and Giordano Maioli (ITA)
1970 Turin	Jun Kamiwazumi and Toshiro Sakai (JPN)	Toomas Leius and Anatoli Volkov (URS)	Fred McNair and Charlie Owens (USA)
1973 Moscow	Teimuraz Kakulia and Vladimir Korotkov (URS)	Bozhidar Pampoulov and Matei Pampoulov (BUL)	Bertalan Csoknyai and Balázs Taróczy (HUN)
1977 Sofia	Pavel Složil and Tomáš Šmíd (TCH)	Thomas Emmrich and Andreas John (GDR)	Bozhidar Pampoulov and Matei Pampoulov (BUL)
1979 Mexico City	Ramiz Akhmerov and Vadim Borisov (URS)	Dick Metz and Blaine Willenborg (USA)	Andrei Dîrzu and Florin Segărceanu (ROU)
1981 Bucharest	Andrei Dîrzu and Florin Segărceanu (ROU)	Angelo Binaghi and Raimondo Ricci Bitti (ITA)	Vadim Borisov and Sergey Leonyuk (URS)
1983 Edmonton	Jeff Arons and John Sevely (USA)	Angelo Binaghi and Raimondo Ricci Bitti (ITA)	Laurentiu Bucur and Adrian Marcu (ROU)
1985 Kobe	Sergey Leonyuk and Alexander Zverev (URS)	Rick Leach and Tim Pawsat (USA)	Andrei Dîrzu and Florin Segărceanu (ROU)
1987 Zagreb	Branislav Stanković and Richard Vogel (TCH)	Ģirts Dzelde and Andrei Olhovskiy (URS)	Bae Nam-ju and Kim Jae-sik (KOR)
1987 Zagreb	Branislav Stanković and Richard Vogel (TCH)	Ģirts Dzelde and Andrei Olhovskiy (URS)	Igor Šarić and Branko Horvat (YUG)
1991 Sheffield	Chang Eui-jong and Ji Seung-ho (KOR)	Jeffrey Hunter and Mark Loosemore (GBR)	Alessandro Pozzi and Francesco Michelotti (ITA)
1991 Sheffield	Chang Eui-jong and Ji Seung-ho (KOR)	Jeffrey Hunter and Mark Loosemore (GBR)	Dede Suhendar Dinata and Sulistyo Wibowo (INA)
1993 Buffalo	Kim Nam-hoon and Kong Tae-hee (KOR)	Martin Dvořáček and Robert Jahl (CZE)	Robert Janecek and Jay Laschinger (CAN)
1993 Buffalo	Kim Nam-hoon and Kong Tae-hee (KOR)	Martin Dvořáček and Robert Jahl (CZE)	Rob Givone and Michael Sell (USA)
1995 Fukuoka	David Caldwell and Paul Goldstein (USA)	Nicholas Adams and Richard Holden (GBR)	Igor Tchelychev and Andrei Stoliarov (RUS)
1995 Fukuoka	David Caldwell and Paul Goldstein (USA)	Nicholas Adams and Richard Holden (GBR)	Xavier Avila and Fermín Novillo (ESP)
1997 Sicily	Lee Hyung-taik and Yoon Yong-il (KOR)	Martin Dvořáček and Pavel Kudrnáč (CZE)	Massimo Calvelli and Lorenzo Pennisi (ITA)
1997 Sicily	Lee Hyung-taik and Yoon Yong-il (KOR)	Martin Dvořáček and Pavel Kudrnáč (CZE)	Vladimir Lys and Aleksandr Yarmola (UKR)
1999 Palma de Mallorca	Pavel Kudrnáč and Jan Vacek (CZE)	Helge Capell and Alexander von Hugo (GER)	Marc Gicquel and Slimane Saoudi (FRA)
1999 Palma de Mallorca	Pavel Kudrnáč and Jan Vacek (CZE)	Helge Capell and Alexander von Hugo (GER)	Michihisa Onoda and Norikazu Sugiyama (JPN)
2001 Beijing	Juan Carlos Arredondo and Carlos Alberto Lozano (MEX)	Pavel Kudrnáč and Tomáš Macharáček (CZE)	Li Si and Yang Jingzhu (CHN)
2001 Beijing	Juan Carlos Arredondo and Carlos Alberto Lozano (MEX)	Pavel Kudrnáč and Tomáš Macharáček (CZE)	Kim Dong-hyun and Lee Chang-hoon (KOR)
2003 Daegu	Iain Bates and Jim May (GBR)	Rodrigo Echagaray and Carlos Alberto Lozano (MEX)	Ján Stančík and Igor Zelenay (SVK)
2003 Daegu	Iain Bates and Jim May (GBR)	Rodrigo Echagaray and Carlos Alberto Lozano (MEX)	Sanchai Ratiwatana and Sonchat Ratiwatana (THA)
2005 Izmir	Artem Sitak and Dmitri Sitak (RUS)	Nikola Ćirić and Darko Mađarovski (SCG)	Radosław Nijaki and Filip Urban (POL)
2005 Izmir	Artem Sitak and Dmitri Sitak (RUS)	Nikola Ćirić and Darko Mađarovski (SCG)	Viktor Bruthans and Peter Miklušičák (SVK)
2007 Bangkok	Sanchai Ratiwatana and Sonchat Ratiwatana (THA)	Pavel Chekhov and Alexandre Krasnoroutskiy (RUS)	Prima Simpatiaji and Sunu Wahyu Trijati (INA)
2007 Bangkok	Sanchai Ratiwatana and Sonchat Ratiwatana (THA)	Pavel Chekhov and Alexandre Krasnoroutskiy (RUS)	An Jae-sung and Kim Sun-yong (KOR)
2009 Belgrade	Yi Chu-huan and Lee Hsin-han (TPE)	Max Jones and Dominic Inglot (GBR)	David Estruch and Ignasi Villacampa (ESP)
2009 Belgrade	Yi Chu-huan and Lee Hsin-han (TPE)	Max Jones and Dominic Inglot (GBR)	Aleksandar Grubin and Boris Čonkić (SRB)
2011 Shenzhen	Hsieh Cheng-peng and Lee Hsin-han (TPE)	Sergey Betov and Aliaksandr Bury (BLR)	Lim Yong-kyu and Seol Jae-min (KOR)
2011 Shenzhen	Hsieh Cheng-peng and Lee Hsin-han (TPE)	Sergey Betov and Aliaksandr Bury (BLR)	David Estruch and Pablo Manuel Montoro Gimenez (ESP)
2013 Kazan	Lee Hsin-han and Peng Hsien-yin (TPE)	Victor Baluda and Konstantin Kravchuk (RUS)	Sergey Betov and Aliaksandr Bury (BLR)
2013 Kazan	Lee Hsin-han and Peng Hsien-yin (TPE)	Victor Baluda and Konstantin Kravchuk (RUS)	Lim Yong-kyu and Noh Sang-woo (KOR)
2015 Gwangju	Joe Salisbury and Darren Walsh (GBR)	Chung Hyeon and Nam Ji-sung (KOR)	Lee Hsin-han and Peng Hsien-yin (TPE)
2015 Gwangju	Joe Salisbury and Darren Walsh (GBR)	Chung Hyeon and Nam Ji-sung (KOR)	Shintaro Imai and Kaito Uesugi (JPN)
2017 Taipei	Aslan Karatsev and Richard Muzaev (RUS)	Jack Findel-Hawkins and Luke Johnson (GBR)	Shintaro Imai and Kaito Uesugi (JPN)
2017 Taipei	Aslan Karatsev and Richard Muzaev (RUS)	Jack Findel-Hawkins and Luke Johnson (GBR)	Wong Chun-hun and Yeung Pak-long (HKG)
2019 Naples	Sanjar Fayziev and Khumoyun Sultanov (UZB)	Hong Seong-chan and Shin San-hui (KOR)	Yuya Ito and Sho Shimabukuro (JPN)
2019 Naples	Sanjar Fayziev and Khumoyun Sultanov (UZB)	Hong Seong-chan and Shin San-hui (KOR)	Wu Hao and Xu Shuai (CHN)
2021 Chengdu	Hsu Yu-hsiou and Huang Tsung-hao (TPE)	Jan Jemář and Victor Sklenka (CZE)	Shinji Hazana and Ryotaro Taguchi (JPN)
2021 Chengdu	Hsu Yu-hsiou and Huang Tsung-hao (TPE)	Jan Jemář and Victor Sklenka (CZE)	Jonas Shär and Jeffrey van der Schulemberg (SUI)
2025 Essen	Egor Agafonov and Ilia Simakin (AIN)	Mert Alkaya and Tuncay Duran (TUR)	John Gabelic and Nikola Slavic (SWE)
2025 Essen	Egor Agafonov and Ilia Simakin (AIN)	Mert Alkaya and Tuncay Duran (TUR)	Fabio De Michele and Mariano Tammaro (ITA)

=== Men's team ===
Games	Gold	Silver	Bronze
2009 Belgrade	Serbia (SRB); Aleksander Slović; Saša Stojisavljević; Aleksandar Grubin; Boris Čonkić	Ukraine (UKR); Ivan Sergeyev; Artem Smirnov	Chinese Taipei (TPE); Lee Hsin-han; Yi Chu-huan
2011 Shenzhen	South Korea (KOR); Lim Yong-kyu; Oh Dae-soung; Seol Jae-min	Belarus (BLR); Sergey Betov; Aliaksandr Bury	Chinese Taipei (TPE); Hsieh Cheng-peng; Huang Liang-chi; Lee Hsin-han
2013 Kazan	South Korea (KOR); Lim Yong-kyu; Oh Dae-soung; Seol Jae-min	Chinese Taipei (TPE); Lee Hsin-han; Peng Hsien-yin; Huang Liang-chi; Wang Chieh-fu	Russia (RUS); Konstantin Kravchuk; Victor Baluda
2015 Gwangju	South Korea (KOR); Chung Hyeon; Chung Hong; Lee Jea-moon; Nam Ji-sung	Chinese Taipei (TPE); Lee Hsin-han; Peng Hsien-yin; Huang Liang-chi; Yang Tsung-hua	Russia (RUS); Aslan Karatsev; Evgenii Tiurnev
2017 Taipei	Chinese Taipei (TPE); Hsieh Cheng-peng; Jason Jung; Lee Kuan-yi; Peng Hsien-yin	Japan (JPN); Shintaro Imai; Yuya Ito; Kaito Uesugi	Russia (RUS); Aslan Karatsev; Richard Muzaev; Roman Safiullin
2019 Naples	Uzbekistan (UZB); Sanjar Fayziev; Khumoyun Sultanov	Russia (RUS); Ivan Gakhov; Timur Kiyamov	Chinese Taipei (TPE); Tseng Chun-hsin; Wu Tung-lin
2021 Chengdu	Chinese Taipei (TPE)	Switzerland (SUI)	Japan (JPN)
2025 Essen	Japan (JPN)	Great Britain (GBR)	Turkey (TUR)

=== Women's singles ===
Games	Gold	Silver	Bronze
1959 Turin	Irina Ermolova (URS)	Zdenka Strachová (TCH)	Maria Teresa Riedl (ITA)
1961 Sofia	Jitka Horčičková (TCH)	Zdenka Strachová (TCH)	Paula Vajda (HUN)
1963 Porto Alegre	Jitka Horčičková (TCH)	Irina Ermolova (URS)	Maria Teresa Riedl (ITA)
1965 Budapest	Maria Teresa Riedl (ITA)	Irina Ermolova (URS)	Erzsébet Széll (HUN)
1967 Tokyo	Nell Truman (GBR)	Ada Bakker (NED)	Chieko Ota (JPN)
1970 Turin	Tiiu Parmas (URS)	Junko Sawamatsu (JPN)	Odile de Roubin (FRA)
1973 Moscow	Olga Morozova (URS)	Kazuko Sawamatsu (JPN)	Janet Young (AUS)
1977 Sofia	Marina Kroschina (URS)	Renáta Tomanová (TCH)	Eugenia Birioukova (URS)
1979 Mexico City	Natasha Chmyreva (URS)	Eugenia Birioukova (URS)	Virginia Ruzici (ROU)
1981 Bucharest	Virginia Ruzici (ROU)	Lucia Romanov (ROU)	Kelly Henry (USA)
1983 Edmonton	Cecilia Fernandez (USA)	Olga Zaitseva (URS)	Lucia Romanov (ROU)
1985 Kobe	Larisa Savchenko (URS)	Gretchen Rush (USA)	Marilda Julia (PUR)
1987 Zagreb	Leila Meskhi (URS)	Iva Budařová (TCH)	Sabrina Goleš (YUG)
1987 Zagreb	Leila Meskhi (URS)	Iva Budařová (TCH)	Lee Jeong-myung (KOR)
1991 Sheffield	Mana Endo (JPN)	Rika Hiraki (JPN)	Kim Il-soon (KOR)
1991 Sheffield	Mana Endo (JPN)	Rika Hiraki (JPN)	Rosa Bielsa (ESP)
1993 Buffalo	Yi Jing-Qian (CHN)	Kaoru Shibata (JPN)	Olivia Gravereaux (FRA)
1993 Buffalo	Yi Jing-Qian (CHN)	Kaoru Shibata (JPN)	Samantha Smith (GBR)
1995 Fukuoka	Kaoru Shibata (JPN)	Rika Hiraki (JPN)	Kelly Pace (USA)
1995 Fukuoka	Kaoru Shibata (JPN)	Rika Hiraki (JPN)	Wang Shi-ting (TPE)
1997 Sicily	Wang Shi-ting (TPE)	Nathalie Callen (FRA)	Jeon Mi-ra (KOR)
1997 Sicily	Wang Shi-ting (TPE)	Nathalie Callen (FRA)	Germana Di Natale (ITA)
1999 Palma de Mallorca	Janet Lee (TPE)	Wang Shi-ting (TPE)	Zuzana Lešenarová (CZE)
1999 Palma de Mallorca	Janet Lee (TPE)	Wang Shi-ting (TPE)	Andrea Šebová (SVK)
2001 Beijing	Li Na (CHN)	Janet Lee (TPE)	Chung Yang-jin (KOR)
2001 Beijing	Li Na (CHN)	Janet Lee (TPE)	Amanda Janes (GBR)
2003 Daegu	Gulnara Fattakhetdinova (RUS)	Xie Yanze (CHN)	Akgul Amanmuradova (UZB)
2003 Daegu	Gulnara Fattakhetdinova (RUS)	Xie Yanze (CHN)	Liu Nannan (CHN)
2005 Izmir	Eva Hrdinová (CZE)	Cho Yoon-jeong (KOR)	Chan Chin-wei (TPE)
2005 Izmir	Eva Hrdinová (CZE)	Cho Yoon-jeong (KOR)	Hsieh Su-wei (TPE)
2007 Bangkok	Alisa Kleybanova (RUS)	Margit Rüütel (EST)	Chan Chin-wei (TPE)
2007 Bangkok	Alisa Kleybanova (RUS)	Margit Rüütel (EST)	Sandy Gumulya (INA)
2009 Belgrade	Ksenia Lykina (RUS)	Klaudia Jans (POL)	Katarína Kachlíková (SVK)
2009 Belgrade	Ksenia Lykina (RUS)	Klaudia Jans (POL)	Nikola Fraňková (CZE)
2011 Shenzhen	Nudnida Luangnam (THA)	Nungnadda Wannasuk (THA)	Ksenia Lykina (RUS)
2011 Shenzhen	Nudnida Luangnam (THA)	Nungnadda Wannasuk (THA)	Yoo Mi (KOR)
2013 Kazan	Sachie Ishizu (JPN)	Sabrina Santamaria (USA)	Kateřina Vaňková (CZE)
2013 Kazan	Sachie Ishizu (JPN)	Sabrina Santamaria (USA)	Hiroko Kuwata (JPN)
2015 Gwangju	Chang Kai-chen (TPE)	Luksika Kumkhum (THA)	Beatrice Gumulya (INA)
2015 Gwangju	Chang Kai-chen (TPE)	Luksika Kumkhum (THA)	Varatchaya Wongteanchai (THA)
2017 Taipei	Varatchaya Wongteanchai (THA)	Lee Ya-hsuan (TPE)	Chang Kai-chen (TPE)
2017 Taipei	Varatchaya Wongteanchai (THA)	Lee Ya-hsuan (TPE)	Patcharin Cheapchandej (THA)
2019 Naples	Naho Sato (JPN)	Emily Arbuthnott (GBR)	Eudice Chong (HKG)
2019 Naples	Naho Sato (JPN)	Emily Arbuthnott (GBR)	Chompoothip Jundakate (THA)
2021 Chengdu	Guo Hanyu (CHN)	Yang Ya-yi (TPE)	Alice Robbe (FRA)
2021 Chengdu	Guo Hanyu (CHN)	Yang Ya-yi (TPE)	Liang En-shuo (TPE)
2025 Essen	Eszter Méri (SVK)	Alevtina Ibragimova (AIN)	Jana Otzipka (BEL)
2025 Essen	Eszter Méri (SVK)	Alevtina Ibragimova (AIN)	Vaishnavi Adkar (IND)

=== Women's doubles ===
Games	Gold	Silver	Bronze
1959 Turin	Maria Chiara Ramorino and Maria Teresa Riedl (ITA)	Jitka Horčičková and Zdenka Strachová (TCH)	Heidi Haas and Gisela Timm (FRG)
1961 Sofia	Mina Illina and Julieta Namian (ROU)	Jitka Horčičková and Zdenka Strachová (TCH)	Györgyi Fehér and Paula Vajda (HUN)
1963 Porto Alegre	Györgyi Fehér and Zsuzsa Kunovits (HUN)	Mary Puljak and Doris Silva (URU)	Helena Monteiro and Maureen Schwartz (BRA)
1965 Budapest	Alessandra Gobbo and Maria Teresa Riedl (ITA)	Valentina Sazonova and Irina Ermolova (URS)	Eva De Jong and Anja Lepoutre (NED)
1967 Tokyo	Ada Bakker and Astrid Suurbeek (NED)	Monica Giorgi and Alessandra Gobbo (ITA)	Frances MacLennan and Nell Truman (GBR)
1970 Turin	Ada Bakker and Tine Zwaan (NED)	Junko Sawamatsu and Kazuko Sawamatsu (JPN)	Tiiu Parmas and Mariya Sobol (URS)
1973 Moscow	Zaiga Jansone-Ivanova and Olga Morozova (URS)	Kayoko Fukuoka and Kazuko Sawamatsu (JPN)	Janice Metcalf and Jane Stratton (USA)
1977 Sofia	Florența Mihai and Virginia Ruzici (ROU)	Yvona Brzáková and Renáta Tomanová (TCH)	Eugenia Birioukova and Marina Kroschina (URS)
1979 Mexico City	Florența Mihai and Virginia Ruzici (ROU)	Eugenia Birioukova and Natasha Chmyreva (URS)	Ham Yung-da and Kim Soo-ok (KOR)
1981 Bucharest	Florența Mihai and Virginia Ruzici (ROU)	Fumiko Furuhashi and Masako Yanagi (JPN)	Yelena Gizhiyang and Ludmila Makarova (URS)
1983 Edmonton	Karen Dewis and Jill Hetherington (CAN)	Junko Kimura and Kumiko Okamoto (JPN)	Svetlana Cherneva and Olga Zaitseva (URS)
1985 Kobe	Svetlana Parkhomenko and Larisa Savchenko (URS)	Elizabeth Jones and Joy Tacon (GBR)	Ann Hulbert and Gretchen Rush (USA)
1987 Zagreb	Leila Meskhi and Viktoria Milvidskaia (URS)	Nora Bajčíková and Iva Budařová (TCH)	Katrina Adams and Sonia Hahn (USA)
1987 Zagreb	Leila Meskhi and Viktoria Milvidskaia (URS)	Nora Bajčíková and Iva Budařová (TCH)	Renata Šašak and Biljana Mirković (YUG)
1991 Sheffield	Mana Endo and Rika Hiraki (JPN)	Kim Il-soon and Lee Jeong-myung (KOR)	Angela Lettiere and Erika Kuttler (USA)
1991 Sheffield	Mana Endo and Rika Hiraki (JPN)	Kim Il-soon and Lee Jeong-myung (KOR)	Anke Marchl and Eva-Maria Schürhoff (GER)
1993 Buffalo	Chen Li-Ling and Yi Jing-Qian (CHN)	Nao Akahori and Rika Hiraki (JPN)	Alexandra Boutelier and Olivia Gravereaux (FRA)
1993 Buffalo	Chen Li-Ling and Yi Jing-Qian (CHN)	Nao Akahori and Rika Hiraki (JPN)	Sabine Gerke and Eva-Maria Schürhoff (GER)
1995 Fukuoka	Shinobu Asagoe and Rika Hiraki (JPN)	Wang Shi-ting and Liu Hong-lan (TPE)	Son Hyun-hee and Shin Hyun-a (KOR)
1995 Fukuoka	Shinobu Asagoe and Rika Hiraki (JPN)	Wang Shi-ting and Liu Hong-lan (TPE)	Sabine Gerke and Claudia Timm (GER)
1997 Sicily	Wang Shi-ting and Hsu Hsueh-li (TPE)	Magdalena Feistel and Katarzyna Teodorowicz (POL)	Shinobu Asagoe and Seiko Okamoto (JPN)
1997 Sicily	Wang Shi-ting and Hsu Hsueh-li (TPE)	Magdalena Feistel and Katarzyna Teodorowicz (POL)	Patrícia Marková and Martina Ondrejková (SVK)
1999 Palma de Mallorca	Janet Lee and Wang Shi-ting (TPE)	Katarzyna Teodorowicz and Anna Żarska (POL)	Seiko Okamoto and Ryoko Takemura (JPN)
1999 Palma de Mallorca	Janet Lee and Wang Shi-ting (TPE)	Katarzyna Teodorowicz and Anna Żarska (POL)	Patrícia Marková and Andrea Šebová (SVK)
2001 Beijing	Li Na and Li Ting (CHN)	Kim Eun-ha and Kim Mi-ok (KOR)	Julie Coin and Emilie Scribot (FRA)
2001 Beijing	Li Na and Li Ting (CHN)	Kim Eun-ha and Kim Mi-ok (KOR)	Janet Lee and Weng Tzu-ting (TPE)
2003 Daegu	Chan Chin-wei and Chuang Chia-jung (TPE)	Katarína Bašternáková and Stanislava Hrozenská (SVK)	Hanna Krampe and Lydia Steinbach (GER)
2003 Daegu	Chan Chin-wei and Chuang Chia-jung (TPE)	Katarína Bašternáková and Stanislava Hrozenská (SVK)	Lorena Arias and Erika Valdés (MEX)
2005 Izmir	Chuang Chia-jung and Hsieh Su-wei (TPE)	Katarína Bašternáková and Stanislava Hrozenská (SVK)	Tomoko Dokei and Junri Namigata (JPN)
2005 Izmir	Chuang Chia-jung and Hsieh Su-wei (TPE)	Katarína Bašternáková and Stanislava Hrozenská (SVK)	Lorena Arias and Marcela Arroyo (MEX)
2007 Bangkok	Chan Chin-wei and Chuang Chia-jung (TPE)	Amina Rakhim and Madina Rakhim (KAZ)	Ivana Abramović and Maria Abramović (CRO)
2007 Bangkok	Chan Chin-wei and Chuang Chia-jung (TPE)	Amina Rakhim and Madina Rakhim (KAZ)	Lee Jin-a and Yoo Mi (KOR)
2009 Belgrade	Vitalia Diatchenko and Ekaterina Makarova (RUS)	Alicja Rosolska and Klaudia Jans (POL)	Shuko Aoyama and Miki Miyamura (JPN)
2009 Belgrade	Vitalia Diatchenko and Ekaterina Makarova (RUS)	Alicja Rosolska and Klaudia Jans (POL)	Katarína Kachlíková and Martina Babáková (SVK)
2011 Shenzhen	Shuko Aoyama and Kotomi Takahata (JPN)	Guo Li and Li Ting (CHN)	Valeria Pulido and Nazari Urbina (MEX)
2011 Shenzhen	Shuko Aoyama and Kotomi Takahata (JPN)	Guo Li and Li Ting (CHN)	Ksenia Lykina and Marta Sirotkina (RUS)
2013 Kazan	Anastasia Pavlyuchenkova and Elena Vesnina (RUS)	Noppawan Lertcheewakarn and Varatchaya Wongteanchai (THA)	Darya Lebesheva and Polina Pekhova (BLR)
2013 Kazan	Anastasia Pavlyuchenkova and Elena Vesnina (RUS)	Noppawan Lertcheewakarn and Varatchaya Wongteanchai (THA)	Barbara Sobaszkiewicz and Sylwia Zagórska (POL)
2015 Gwangju	Han Na-lae and Lee So-ra (KOR)	Hsu Chieh-yu and Lee Ya-hsuan (TPE)	Erina Hayashi and Aiko Yoshitomi (JPN)
2015 Gwangju	Han Na-lae and Lee So-ra (KOR)	Hsu Chieh-yu and Lee Ya-hsuan (TPE)	Noppawan Lertcheewakarn and Varatchaya Wongteanchai (THA)
2017 Taipei	Chan Hao-ching and Chan Yung-jan (TPE)	Varatchaya Wongteanchai and Varunya Wongteanchai (THA)	Erina Hayashi and Robu Kajitani (JPN)
2017 Taipei	Chan Hao-ching and Chan Yung-jan (TPE)	Varatchaya Wongteanchai and Varunya Wongteanchai (THA)	Emily Arbuthnott and Olivia Nicholls (GBR)
2019 Naples	Guo Hanyu and Ye Qiuyu (CHN)	Lee Pei-chi and Lee Ya-hsuan (TPE)	Kanako Morisaki and Naho Sato (JPN)
2019 Naples	Guo Hanyu and Ye Qiuyu (CHN)	Lee Pei-chi and Lee Ya-hsuan (TPE)	Eudice Chong and Maggie Ng (HKG)
2021 Chengdu	Liang En-shuo and Wu Fang-hsien (TPE)	Guo Hanyu and Jiang Xinyu (CHN)	Kimberly Hance and Elise Wagle (USA)
2021 Chengdu	Liang En-shuo and Wu Fang-hsien (TPE)	Guo Hanyu and Jiang Xinyu (CHN)	Misaki Matsuda; Ikumi Yamazaki (JPN)
2025 Essen	Ange Oby Kajuru and Kanon Yamaguchi (JPN)	Li Yu-yun and Lin Fang-an (TPE)	Li Zongyu and Yao Xinxin (CHN)
2025 Essen	Ange Oby Kajuru and Kanon Yamaguchi (JPN)	Li Yu-yun and Lin Fang-an (TPE)	Alevtina Ibragimova and Kseniia Zaitseva (AIN)

=== Women's team ===
Games	Gold	Silver	Bronze
2009 Belgrade	Russia (RUS); Vitalia Diatchenko; Ekaterina Makarova; Ksenia Lykina	Poland (POL); Klaudia Jans; Alicja Rosolska	Slovakia (SVK); Martina Babáková; Katarína Kachlíková
2011 Shenzhen	Thailand (THA); Nudnida Luangnam; Nungnadda Wannasuk; Varatchaya Wongteanchai	Japan (JPN); Shuko Aoyama; Sachie Ishizu; Hiroko Kuwata; Kotomi Takahata	Russia (RUS); Ksenia Lykina; Marta Sirotkina
2013 Kazan	Japan (JPN); Sachie Ishizu; Hiroko Kuwata; Yuuki Tanaka	Russia (RUS); Anastasia Pavlyuchenkova; Elena Vesnina; Ekaterina Yashina; Margarita Gasparyan	United States (USA); Sabrina Santamaria; Kaitlyn Christian
2015 Gwangju	Chinese Taipei (TPE); Chang Kai-chen; Hsu Chieh-yu; Hsieh Yu-chieh; Lee Ya-hsuan	Thailand (THA); Noppawan Lertcheewakarn; Luksika Kumkhum; Varatchaya Wongteanchai	South Korea (KOR); Jang Su-jeong; Han Na-lae; Lee So-ra
2017 Taipei	Chinese Taipei (TPE); Chan Hao-ching; Chan Yung-jan; Chang Kai-chen; Lee Ya-hsuan	Thailand (THA); Patcharin Cheapchandej; Chompoothip Jundakate; Varatchaya Wongteanchai; Varunya Wongteanchai	Japan (JPN); Erina Hayashi; Haruka Kaji; Robu Kajitani; Risa Ushijima
2019 Naples	Japan (JPN); Kanako Morisaki; Naho Sato	China (CHN); Guo Hanyu; Ye Qiuyu	Russia (RUS); Victoria Kan; Yana Sizikova
2021 Chengdu	Chinese Taipei (TPE)	China (CHN)	Japan (JPN)
2025 Essen	Japan (JPN)	Slovakia (SVK)	Kenya (KEN)

=== Mixed doubles ===
Games	Gold	Silver	Bronze
1959 Turin	Maria Chiara Ramorino and Massimo Drisaldi (ITA)	Janine Lieffrig and Chevalier (FRA)	Zdenka Strachová and Schonborn (TCH)
1961 Sofia	Maria Teresa Riedl and Massimo Drisaldi (ITA)	Jitka Horčičková and Safarik (TCH)	Mina and Ion Țiriac (ROU)
1963 Porto Alegre	Maria Teresa Riedl and Giordano Maioli (ITA)	Larue and Leclerq (FRA)	Hausslein and Müller (FRG)
1965 Budapest	Judith Dibar and Ion Țiriac (ROU)	Irina Ermolova and Toomas Leius (URS)	Maria Teresa Riedl and Giordano Maioli (ITA)
1967 Tokyo	Kaye Dening and Geoff Pollard (AUS)	Monica Giorgi and Giordano Maioli (ITA)	Chieko Ota and Takeshi Koura (JPN)
1970 Turin	Tiiu Parmas and Toomas Leius (URS)	Janet Young and Geoff Pollard (AUS)	Mona Schallau and Charlie Owens (USA)
1973 Moscow	Olga Morozova and Teimuraz Kakulia (URS)	Kazuko Sawamatsu and Kenichi Hirai (JPN)	Janet Young and John Marks (AUS)
1977 Sofia	Renáta Tomanová and Pavel Složil (TCH)	Virginia Ruzici and Dumitru Hărădău (ROU)	Eugenia Birioukova and Ramiz Akhmerov (URS)
1979 Mexico City	Virginia Ruzici and Gavril Marc (ROU)	Eugenia Birioukova and Ramiz Akhmerov (URS)	Hélène Pelletier and Nick Mohtadi (CAN)
1981 Bucharest	Virginia Ruzici and Florin Segărceanu (ROU)	Ludmila Makarova and Sergey Leonyuk (URS)	Kim Soon-ok and Jeon Young-dae (KOR)
1983 Edmonton	Jill Hetherington and Bill Jenkins (CAN)	Cornelia Dries and Jochen Settelmeyer (FRG)	Svetlana Cherneva and Filev (URS)
1985 Kobe	Daniela Moise and Florin Segărceanu (ROU)	Larisa Savchenko and Sergey Leonyuk (URS)	J. Lee and Yoo Jin-sun (KOR)
1987 Zagreb	Sabrina Goleš and Bruno Orešar (YUG)	Leila Meskhi and Andrei Olhovskiy (URS)	Katrina Adams and Greg Van Emburgh (USA)
1987 Zagreb	Sabrina Goleš and Bruno Orešar (YUG)	Leila Meskhi and Andrei Olhovskiy (URS)	Kim Il-soon and Roh Gap-taik (KOR)
1991 Sheffield	Susan Gilchrist and Brett Hansen-Dent (USA)	Rika Hiraki and Tetsuya Sato (JPN)	Katrina Adams and Greg Van Emburgh (USA)
1991 Sheffield	Susan Gilchrist and Brett Hansen-Dent (USA)	Rika Hiraki and Tetsuya Sato (JPN)	Rosa Bielsa and Constantino Villar (ESP)
1993 Buffalo	Rika Hiraki and Natsuki Harada (JPN)	Karina Kuregian and Sargis Sargsian (ARM)	Virág Csurgó and András Lányi (HUN)
1993 Buffalo	Rika Hiraki and Natsuki Harada (JPN)	Karina Kuregian and Sargis Sargsian (ARM)	Patrícia Marková and Roman Šmotlák (SVK)
1995 Fukuoka	Wang Shi-ting and Chen Chih-jung (TPE)	Samantha Smith and Paul Robinson (GBR)	Olga Ivanova and Igor Tchelychev (RUS)
1995 Fukuoka	Wang Shi-ting and Chen Chih-jung (TPE)	Samantha Smith and Paul Robinson (GBR)	Son Hyun-hee and Baek Seung-bok (KOR)
1997 Sicily	Jeon Mi-ra and Kim (KOR)	Wang Shi-ting and Lin Bing-chao (TPE)	Claudia Timm and Alexander von Hugo (GER)
1997 Sicily	Jeon Mi-ra and Kim (KOR)	Wang Shi-ting and Lin Bing-chao (TPE)	Patrícia Marková and Erik Csarnakovics (SVK)
1999 Palma de Mallorca	Kim Eun-ha and Kim Dong-hyun (KOR)	Wang Shi-ting and Lin Bing-chao (TPE)	Ding Ding and Zhu Benqiang (CHN)
1999 Palma de Mallorca	Kim Eun-ha and Kim Dong-hyun (KOR)	Wang Shi-ting and Lin Bing-chao (TPE)	Seiko Okamoto and Michihisa Onoda (JPN)
2001 Beijing	Li Na and Zhu Benqiang (CHN)	Susi Bensch and Jan Boruszewski (GER)	Linda Faltynková and Tomáš Macharáček (CZE)
2001 Beijing	Li Na and Zhu Benqiang (CHN)	Susi Bensch and Jan Boruszewski (GER)	Kim Eun-ha and Kim Dong-hyun (KOR)
2003 Daegu	Maria Goloviznina and Artem Derepasko (RUS)	Xie Yanze and Wang Yu (CHN)	Lydia Steinbach and Jan Boruszewski (GER)
2003 Daegu	Maria Goloviznina and Artem Derepasko (RUS)	Xie Yanze and Wang Yu (CHN)	Stanislava Hrozenská and Igor Zelenay (SVK)
2005 Izmir	Chuang Chia-jung and Chen Ti (TPE)	Lorena Arias and Víctor Romero (MEX)	Tomoko Dokei and Joji Miyao (JPN)
2005 Izmir	Chuang Chia-jung and Chen Ti (TPE)	Lorena Arias and Víctor Romero (MEX)	Stanislava Hrozenská and Viktor Bruthans (SVK)
2007 Bangkok	Eva Hrdinová and Pavel Šnobel (CZE)	Alisa Kleybanova and Alexandre Krasnoroutskiy (RUS)	Ivana Abramović and Ivan Cerović (CRO)
2007 Bangkok	Eva Hrdinová and Pavel Šnobel (CZE)	Alisa Kleybanova and Alexandre Krasnoroutskiy (RUS)	Chuang Chia-jung and Chen Ti (TPE)
2009 Belgrade	Chuang Chia-jung and Yi Chu-huan (TPE)	Kim Hyun-joon and Kim So-jung (KOR)	Luis Díaz Barriga and Melissa Torres (MEX)
2009 Belgrade	Chuang Chia-jung and Yi Chu-huan (TPE)	Kim Hyun-joon and Kim So-jung (KOR)	Dominic Inglot and Sam Murray (GBR)
2011 Shenzhen	Chan Chin-wei and Lee Hsin-han (TPE)	Aliaksandr Bury and Sviatlana Pirazhenka (BLR)	Shuko Aoyama and Takuto Niki (JPN)
2011 Shenzhen	Chan Chin-wei and Lee Hsin-han (TPE)	Aliaksandr Bury and Sviatlana Pirazhenka (BLR)	Weerapat Doakmaiklee and Varatchaya Wongteanchai (THA)
2013 Kazan	Elena Vesnina and Andrey Kuznetsov (RUS)	Hiroko Kuwata and Shota Tagawa (JPN)	Patrick Eichenberger and Lisa Sabino (SUI)
2013 Kazan	Elena Vesnina and Andrey Kuznetsov (RUS)	Hiroko Kuwata and Shota Tagawa (JPN)	Lee Hsin-han and Lee Hua-chen (TPE)
2015 Gwangju	Lidziya Marozava and Andrei Vasilevski (BLR)	Alexandra Walker and Darren Walsh (GBR)	Veronika Kudermetova and Aslan Karatsev (RUS)
2015 Gwangju	Lidziya Marozava and Andrei Vasilevski (BLR)	Alexandra Walker and Darren Walsh (GBR)	Chang Kai-chen and Peng Hsien-yin (TPE)
2017 Taipei	Erina Hayashi and Kaito Uesugi (JPN)	Simona Parajová and Ivan Kosec (SVK)	Chan Yung-jan and Hsieh Cheng-peng (TPE)
2017 Taipei	Erina Hayashi and Kaito Uesugi (JPN)	Simona Parajová and Ivan Kosec (SVK)	Jada Hart and Logan Staggs (USA)
2019 Naples	Yana Sizikova and Ivan Gakhov (RUS)	Anastasia Zarycká and Dominik Kellovský (CZE)	Ye Qiuyu and Wu Hao (CHN)
2019 Naples	Yana Sizikova and Ivan Gakhov (RUS)	Anastasia Zarycká and Dominik Kellovský (CZE)	Alice Robbe and Ronan Joncour (FRA)
2021 Chengdu	Hsu Yu-hsiou; Liang En-shuo (TPE)	Jin Yuquan; Tang Qianhui (CHN)	Tomoya Fujiwara; Lisa Marie Rioux (JPN)
2021 Chengdu	Hsu Yu-hsiou; Liang En-shuo (TPE)	Jin Yuquan; Tang Qianhui (CHN)	Wong Chak Lam; Wong Hong Yi (HKG)
2025 Essen	Natsuki Yoshimoto; Jay Dylan Hara Friend (JPN)	Angella Okutoyi; Kael Shah (KEN)	Maria Libório Garcia; Pedro Araújo (POR)
2025 Essen	Natsuki Yoshimoto; Jay Dylan Hara Friend (JPN)	Angella Okutoyi; Kael Shah (KEN)	Karolína Kubáňová; Jan Jermář (CZE)

== Medal table ==
Last updated after the 2025 Summer World University Games

Rank	Nation	Gold	Silver	Bronze	Total
1	Chinese Taipei (TPE)	27	12	21	60
2	Japan (JPN)	19	19	27	65
3	Soviet Union (URS)	18	16	12	46
4	South Korea (KOR)	17	10	23	50
5	Russia (RUS)	12	9	14	35
6	Romania (ROU)	12	3	10	25
7	China (CHN)	8	7	7	22
8	Czechoslovakia (TCH)	6	10	1	17
9	Italy (ITA)	6	6	14	26
10	United States (USA)	6	5	16	27
11	Thailand (THA)	5	7	6	18
12	Yugoslavia (YUG)	4	3	3	10
13	Great Britain (GBR)	3	11	7	21
14	Czech Republic (CZE)	3	6	5	14
15	Germany (GER)	2	4	9	15
16	France (FRA)	2	3	13	18
17	Uzbekistan (UZB)	2	1	2	5
18	Netherlands (NED)	2	1	1	4
19	Canada (CAN)	2	0	2	4
20	Serbia (SRB)	2	0	1	3
21	Slovakia (SVK)	1	5	12	18
22	Belarus (BLR)	1	3	4	8
23	Hungary (HUN)	1	2	5	8
24	Mexico (MEX)	1	2	4	7
25	Spain (ESP)	1	1	5	7
26	Switzerland (SUI)	1	1	4	6
27	Australia (AUS)	1	1	2	4
28	Individual Neutral Athletes (AIN)	1	1	1	3
29	Poland (POL)	0	5	2	7
30	Ukraine (UKR)	0	2	2	4
31	Bulgaria (BUL)	0	1	1	2
31	India (IND)	0	1	1	2
31	Kenya (KEN)	0	1	1	2
31	Turkey (TUR)	0	1	1	2
35	Armenia (ARM)	0	1	0	1
35	East Germany (GDR)	0	1	0	1
35	Estonia (EST)	0	1	0	1
35	Kazakhstan (KAZ)	0	1	0	1
35	Madagascar (MAD)	0	1	0	1
35	Uruguay (URU)	0	1	0	1
41	Hong Kong (HKG)	0	0	4	4
41	Indonesia (INA)	0	0	4	4
43	Croatia (CRO)	0	0	2	2
43	Portugal (POR)	0	0	2	2
45	Belgium (BEL)	0	0	1	1
45	Brazil (BRA)	0	0	1	1
45	Cuba (CUB)	0	0	1	1
45	Sweden (SWE)	0	0	1	1
Totals (48 entries)		166	166	255	587
