= Baseball at the Summer World University Games =

- Events: 1 (men)

Games
- 1959; 1960; 1961; 1962; 1963; 1964; 1965; 1966; 1967; 1968; 1970; 1970; 1973; 1972; 1975; 1975; 1977; 1978; 1979; 1981; 1983; 1985; 1987; 1989; 1991; 1993; 1995; 1997; 1999; 2001; 2003; 2005; 2007; 2009; 2011; 2013; 2015; 2017; 2019; 2021; 2025

Baseball is not a mandatory sport in the Summer Universiade. In 1993, the sport was held at the XVII Summer Universiade in Buffalo, New York, United States, and it was staged two years later at the XVIII Summer Universiade in Fukuoka, Japan. Twenty years later, the sport made a comeback at the 2015 Summer Universiade in Gwangju, South Korea, and was played again at the 2017 Summer Universiade in Taipei, Taiwan.

== Events ==
Event	93	95	15	17	Total
Men's team	•	•	•	•	4
Events	1	1	1	1	4

== Tournament results ==
Year	Host country	Gold	Silver	Bronze
1993; Details	(United States) Buffalo, USA	Cuba	South Korea	Canada
1995; Details	Fukuoka, Japan	Cuba	South Korea	Japan
2015; Details	Gwangju, South Korea	Japan Chinese Taipei	Not awarded	South Korea
2017; Details	Taipei, Taiwan	Japan	United States	South Korea

== Medal table ==
Rank	Nation	Gold	Silver	Bronze	Total
1	Japan (JPN)	2	0	1	3
2	Cuba (CUB)	2	0	0	2
3	Chinese Taipei (TPE)	1	0	0	1
4	South Korea (KOR)	0	2	2	4
5	United States (USA)	0	1	0	1
6	Canada (CAN)	0	0	1	1
Totals (6 entries)		5	3	4	12

== See also ==
- Baseball awards § World
- World University Baseball Championship
