= 1968 Australian Championships – Women's doubles =

Women's doubles
- 1968 Australian Championships

Final
- Champions: (Australia) Karen Krantzcke (Australia) Kerry Melville
- Runners-up: (Australia) Judy Tegart (Australia) Lesley Turner
- Score: 6–4, 3–6, 6–2

Details
- Draw: 22
- Seeds: 6

Events
Singles	men	women
Doubles	men	women	mixed
- Australian Championships

Judy Tegart and Lesley Turner were the defending champions but lost in the final 6–4, 3–6, 6–2 against Karen Krantzcke and Kerry Melville.

== Seeds ==
Champion seeds are indicated in bold text while text in italics indicates the round in which those seeds were eliminated. The joint top and one team of joint fifth seeded teams received byes into the second round.

1. (United States) Rosemary Casals / (United States) Billie Jean King (semifinals)
  (Australia) **Karen Krantzcke** / (Australia) **Kerry Melville (champions)**
2. n/a
3. (Australia) Judy Tegart / (Australia) Lesley Turner (final)
  (United States) Mary-Ann Eisel / (Australia) Lynne Nette (quarterfinals)
4. n/a
5. (Australia) Kaye Dening / (Australia) Helen Gourlay (quarterfinals)
  (Australia) Margaret Court / (Australia) Gail Sherriff (semifinals)
6. n/a

== Draw ==
Key

- Q = Qualifier
- WC = Wild card
- LL = Lucky loser
- Alt = Alternate
- ITF = ITF entry
- PR = Protected ranking
- SR = Special ranking
- SE = Special exempt
- JE = Junior exempt
- JR = Junior Accelerator Programme entrant
- CO = College Accelerator Programme entrant
- NG = Next Gen Accelerator Program entrant
- w/o = Walkover
- r = Retired
- d = Defaulted

=== Final ===
Final
1	(Australia) **Karen Krantzcke** (Australia) **Kerry Melville**	**6**	3	**6**
3	(Australia) Judy Tegart (Australia) Lesley Turner	4	**6**	2

=== Top half ===
First round
3	(United States) **M A Eisel** (Australia) **L Nette**	**6**	**6**
(Netherlands) E de Jong (Australia) R Lesh	3	4
(Australia) **P Edwards** (Australia) **E Goolagong**	**6**	**6**
(France) Y Boy (Netherlands) J Salome	2	4
(Australia) A Avis (Australia) J Murdoch	2	2
5	(Australia) **M Court** (Australia) **G Sherriff**	**6**	**6**

Second round
1	(Australia) **K Krantzcke** (Australia) **K Melville**	**6**	**6**
(Australia) H Fraser (United Kingdom) D Keller	1	1
(Australia) **W Gilchrist** (Australia) **K Harris**	**8**	3	**6**
(Indonesia) L Kaligis (Indonesia) L Liem	6	**6**	1
3	(United States) **M A Eisel** (Australia) **L Nette**	**6**	**6**
(Australia) P Edwards (Australia) E Goolagong	4	1
(Australia) H McKechnie (Australia) C Sherriff	1	1
5	(Australia) **M Court** (Australia) **G Sherriff**	**6**	**6**

Quarterfinals
1	(Australia) **K Krantzcke** (Australia) **K Melville**	**6**	**6**
(Australia) W Gilchrist (Australia) K Harris	0	1
3	(United States) M A Eisel (Australia) L Nette	**6**	1	3
5	(Australia) **M Court** (Australia) **G Sherriff**	3	**6**	**6**

Semifinals
1	(Australia) **K Krantzcke** (Australia) **K Melville**	**6**	**6**
5	(Australia) M Court (Australia) G Sherriff	2	3

=== Bottom half ===
First round
(Australia) S Goot (Australia) J Nelson	2	2
(Australia) **H Amos** (Mexico) **E Subirats**	**6**	**6**
(Australia) S Stephen (Australia) D Whitely	4	**6**	4
(Australia) **A Jenkins** (Australia) **B Jenkins**	**6**	4	**6**
(Australia) A McKenzie (Australia) S Washbourne	3	1
3	(Australia) **J Tegart** (Australia) **L Turner**	**6**	**6**

Second round
5	(Australia) **K Dening** (Australia) **H Gourlay**	**6**	**9**
(Australia) H Amos (Mexico) E Subirats	1	7
(Australia) A Jenkins (Australia) B Jenkins	1	3
3	(Australia) **J Tegart** (Australia) **L Turner**	**6**	**6**
(United States) J Johnson (United States) G Shepard	1	3
(Netherlands) **A Bakker** (Netherlands) **A Suurbeek**	**6**	**6**
(Australia) L Butterfield (Australia) J Whyte	1	0
1	(United States) **R Casals** (United States) **B J King**	**6**	**6**

Quarterfinals
5	(Australia) K Dening (Australia) H Gourlay	3	2
3	(Australia) **J Tegart** (Australia) **L Turner**	**6**	**6**
(Netherlands) A Bakker (Netherlands) A Suurbeek	4	2
1	(United States) **R Casals** (United States) **B J King**	**6**	**6**

Semifinals
3	(Australia) **J Tegart** (Australia) **L Turner**	**6**	**6**
1	(United States) R Casals (United States) B J King	3	2
