= Karina Kuregian =

Armenian tennis player

- Country (sports): Soviet Union; Armenia
- Born: 5 March 1974 (age 52)

Singles
- Career record: 26–18
- Highest ranking: No. 420 (9 November 1992)

Doubles
- Career record: 37–11
- Career titles: 7 ITF
- Highest ranking: No. 198 (5 October 1992)
Medal record
Representing Armenia
Summer Universiade
Silver medal – second place	1993 Buffalo	Mixed doubles

Karina Kuregian (born 5 March 1974) is an Armenian former professional tennis player. She was a mixed-doubles silver medalist for Armenia at the 1993 Summer Universiade (with Sargis Sargsian).

Kuregian competed on the professional tour during the early 1990s and reached a career best singles ranking of 420 in the world. As a doubles player, she was ranked as high as 198 and won seven titles on the ITF Women's Circuit, including a $25k tournament in Sofia in 1992.

Between 1993 and 1996, she played collegiate tennis for Kansas State. In 1994, she became the first player from Kansas States to earn ITA All-American honors, and in 1995 she partnered with Martine Shrubsole to claim the Big Eight Conference No. 1 Doubles Championship.

== ITF finals ==
Legend
$25,000 tournaments
$10,000 tournaments

=== Singles (0–1) ===
Result	Date	Tournament	Surface	Opponent	Score
Loss	24 November 1991	ITF Ben Aknoun, Algeria	Hard	(France) Lea Ghirardi	3–6, 3–6

=== Doubles (7–2) ===
Result	No.	Date	Tournament	Surface	Partner	Opponents	Score
Win	1.	8 September 1991	ITF Burgas, Bulgaria	Hard	(Soviet Union) Aida Khalatian	(Soviet Union) Maria Marfina (Soviet Union) Svetlana Komleva	6–4, 6–2
Win	2.	24 November 1991	Ben Aknoun, Algeria	Hard	(Soviet Union) Aida Khalatian	(France) Lea Ghirardi (Belgium) Raphaella Liziero	6–4, 6–2
Win	3.	1 December 1991	Bachdjerrah, Algeria	Hard	(Soviet Union) Aida Khalatian	(Soviet Union) Natalia Chasovaya (Soviet Union) Nadia Streltsova	7–6^{(3)}, 6–2
Loss	1.	1 March 1992	Jaffa, Israel	Hard	(Commonwealth of Independent States) Aida Khalatian	(United Kingdom) Virginia Humphreys-Davies (United Kingdom) Jane Wood	4–6, 3–6
Win	4.	8 March 1992	Ramat HaSharon, Israel	Hard	(Commonwealth of Independent States) Aida Khalatian	(United Kingdom) Virginia Humphreys-Davies (United Kingdom) Jane Wood	6–4, 3–6, 6–4
Win	5.	24 May 1992	Salerno, Italy	Clay	(Commonwealth of Independent States) Aida Khalatian	(Italy) Manuela Bargis (Italy) Stefania Indemini	6–3, 6–0
Loss	2.	31 May 1992	Putignano, Italy	Hard	(Commonwealth of Independent States) Aida Khalatian	(Commonwealth of Independent States) Olga Lugina (Commonwealth of Independent States) Elena Makarova	2–6, 4–6
Win	6.	13 September 1992	Varna, Bulgaria	Clay	(Commonwealth of Independent States) Maria Marfina	(Israel) Nelly Barkan (Commonwealth of Independent States) Aida Khalatian	6–4, 6–4
Win	7.	20 September 1992	ITF Sofia, Bulgaria	Clay	(Australia) Kirrily Sharpe	(Bulgaria) Galia Angelova (Bulgaria) Lubomira Bacheva	7–6, 6–2
