= 1993 Davis Cup Asia/Oceania Zone Group II =

International tennis competition

The Asia/Oceania Zone is one of the three zones of the regional Davis Cup competition in 1993.

In the Asia/Oceania Zone there are three different tiers, called groups, in which teams compete against each other to advance to the upper tier. Winners in Group II advanced to the Asia/Oceania Zone Group I. Teams who lost their respective ties competed in the relegation play-offs, with winning teams remaining in Group II, whereas teams who lost their play-offs were relegated to the Asia/Oceania Zone Group III in 1994.

== Participating nations ==
- China
- Iran
- Jordan
- Kuwait
- Malaysia
- Pakistan
- Sri Lanka
- Thailand

=== Draw ===
Relegation Play-offs
Amman, Jordan (hard)
Malaysia	4
Jordan	1
Mishref, Kuwait (hard)
Sri Lanka	5
Kuwait	0

First Round
Kuala Lumpur, Malaysia (indoor hard)
China	4
Malaysia	1
Amman, Jordan (indoor hard)
Jordan	0
Iran	5
Lahore, Pakistan (grass)
Sri Lanka	1
Pakistan	4
Bangkok, Thailand (hard)
Kuwait	0
Thailand	5

Second Round
Tehran, Iran (clay)
China	3
Iran	2
Bangkok, Thailand (hard)
Pakistan	0
Thailand	5

Third Round
Tianjin, China (indoor hard)
China	4
Thailand	1

- Malaysia and Sri Lanka relegated to Group III in 1994.
- China promoted to Group I in 1994.

== First round ==
=== Malaysia vs. China ===
Malaysia
1
National Tennis Centre, Kuala Lumpur, Malaysia
5–7 February 1993
Hard (indoors)

China
4

			1	2	3	4	5
1	(Malaysia) (China)	Terence Chia; Pan Bing	1; 6	3; 6	6; 3			retired
2	(Malaysia) (China)	Ramayah Ramachandran; Xia Jiaping	1; 6	0; 6	6^{1} 7^{7}
3	(Malaysia) (China)	Terence Chia / Ramayah Ramachandran; Meng Qianghua / Xia Jiaping	2; 6	2; 6	1; 6
4	(Malaysia) (China)	Ramayah Ramachandran; Zhang Jiuhua	1; 6	3; 6	2; 6
5	(Malaysia) (China)	Terence Chia; Xia Jiaping	2; 6	4; 6

=== Jordan vs. Iran ===
Jordan
0
Sports Palace, Amman, Jordan
5–7 February 1993
Hard (indoors)

Iran
5

			1	2	3	4	5
1	(Jordan) (Iran)	Emad Abou Hamdeh; Mansour Bahrami	4; 6	3; 6	3; 6
2	(Jordan) (Iran)	Hani Al-Ali; Mustafa Saleh	7^{7} 6^{5}	6; 1	2; 6	2; 6	1; 6
3	(Jordan) (Iran)	Fares Azzouni / Laith Azzouni; Mansour Bahrami / Moharram-Ali Khodai	2; 6	1; 6	1; 6
4	(Jordan) (Iran)	Hani Al-Ali; Mohammed-Reza Tavakoli	3; 6	0; 3				retired
5	(Jordan) (Iran)	Emad Abou Hamdeh; Mustafa Saleh	4; 6	2; 6

=== Pakistan vs. Sri Lanka ===
Pakistan
4
Punjab Tennis Centre, Lahore, Pakistan
5–7 February 1993
Grass

Sri Lanka
1

			1	2	3	4	5
1	(Pakistan) (Sri Lanka)	Mohammed Khalid; Rohan de Silva	6; 4	4; 6	3; 6	5; 7
2	(Pakistan) (Sri Lanka)	Mohamed-Khaliq Siddiq; Jayendra Wijeyesekera	6; 3	6; 2	6; 2
3	(Pakistan) (Sri Lanka)	Mohammed Khalid / Mohamed-Khaliq Siddiq; Rohan de Silva / Arjun Fernando	6; 3	6; 3	2; 6	7; 5
4	(Pakistan) (Sri Lanka)	Mohammed Khalid; Jayendra Wijeyesekera	4; 6	6; 2	6; 4	4; 6	6; 4
5	(Pakistan) (Sri Lanka)	Mohamed-Khaliq Siddiq; Rohan de Silva	6; 3	6; 3

=== Thailand vs. Kuwait ===
Thailand
5
National Tennis Centre, Bangkok, Thailand
5–7 February 1993
Hard

Kuwait
0

			1	2	3	4	5
1	(Thailand) (Kuwait)	Tanakorn Srichaphan; Adel Al-Shatti	6; 2	6; 3	6; 2
2	(Thailand) (Kuwait)	Woraphol Thongkhamchu; Aymen-Ibrahim Al-Ashwak	6; 3	6; 2	6; 0
3	(Thailand) (Kuwait)	Vittaya Samrej / Narathorn Srichaphan; Aymen-Ibrahim Al-Ashwak / Khaled Ashkanani	6; 1	6; 1	6; 0
4	(Thailand) (Kuwait)	Tanakorn Srichaphan; Abdullah Al-Mahmeed	6; 0	6; 1
5	(Thailand) (Kuwait)	Woraphol Thongkhamchu; Adel Al-Shatti	7; 5	6; 2

== Second round ==
=== Iran vs. China ===
Iran
2
Enghelab Sport Complex, Tehran, Iran
26–28 March 1993
Clay

China
3

			1	2	3	4	5
1	(Iran) (China)	Mohammed-Reza Tavakoli; Xia Jiaping	3; 6	3; 6	6^{13} 7^{15}
2	(Iran) (China)	Mansour Bahrami; Zhang Jiuhua	2; 6	2; 6	6; 2	1; 6
3	(Iran) (China)	Mansour Bahrami / Kamyab Derafshijavan; Lin Di / Xia Jiaping	5; 7	6; 4	7^{7} 6^{3}	4; 6	6; 2
4	(Iran) (China)	Mansour Bahrami; Xia Jiaping	5; 7	6^{6} 7^{8}	6; 3	3; 6
5	(Iran) (China)	Mohammed-Reza Tavakoli; Zhang Jiuhua	2; 6	7; 5	1; 0			retired

=== Thailand vs. Pakistan ===
Thailand
5
Sport Authority, Bangkok, Thailand
26–28 March 1993
Hard

Pakistan
0

			1	2	3	4	5
1	(Thailand) (Pakistan)	Tanakorn Srichaphan; Mohamed-Khaliq Siddiq	6; 3	6; 3	6; 2
2	(Thailand) (Pakistan)	Woraphol Thongkhamchu; Mohammed Khalid	6; 2	4; 6	7; 5	6; 3
3	(Thailand) (Pakistan)	Vittaya Samrej / Narathorn Srichaphan; Mohammed Khalid / Mohamed-Khaliq Siddiq	6; 3	6; 2	6; 2
4	(Thailand) (Pakistan)	Tanakorn Srichaphan; Mohammed Khalid	6; 4	6; 1
5	(Thailand) (Pakistan)	Woraphol Thongkhamchu; Mohamed-Khaliq Siddiq	5; 7	6; 3	6; 1

== Relegation play-offs ==
=== Jordan vs. Malaysia ===
Jordan
1
Jordan Tennis Federation, Amman, Jordan
26–28 March 1993
Hard

Malaysia
4

			1	2	3	4	5
1	(Jordan) (Malaysia)	Hani Al-Ali; Terence Chia	5; 7	6; 3	6; 2	7; 5
2	(Jordan) (Malaysia)	Emad Abou Hamdeh; Ramayah Ramachandran	6^{0} 7^{7}	4; 6	6^{1} 7^{7}
3	(Jordan) (Malaysia)	Emad Abou Hamdeh / Hani Al-Ali; Terence Chia / Ramayah Ramachandran	1; 6	3; 6	2; 6
4	(Jordan) (Malaysia)	Hani Al-Ali; Ramayah Ramachandran	0; 6	7^{7} 6^{3}	4; 6	3; 6
5	(Jordan) (Malaysia)	Emad Abou Hamdeh; Terence Chia	6; 2	6^{4} 7^{7}	5; 7

=== Kuwait vs. Sri Lanka ===
Kuwait
0
Al-Yarmouk Sporting Club, Mishref, Kuwait
26–28 March 1993
Hard

Sri Lanka
5

			1	2	3	4	5
1	(Kuwait) (Sri Lanka)	Aymen-Ibrahim Al-Ashwak; Jayendra Wijeyesekera	1; 6	2; 6	5; 7
2	(Kuwait) (Sri Lanka)	Adel Al-Shatti; Rohan de Silva	2; 6	6; 4	3; 6	6; 0	6; 8
3	(Kuwait) (Sri Lanka)	Aymen-Ibrahim Al-Ashwak / Khaled Ashkanani; Rohan de Silva / Jayendra Wijeyesekera	3; 6	6^{4} 7^{7}	3; 6
4	(Kuwait) (Sri Lanka)	Adel Al-Shatti; Jayendra Wijeyesekera	4; 6	2; 6
5	(Kuwait) (Sri Lanka)	Adel Al-Shatti; Lasitha Dissanayake	2; 6	5; 7

== Third round ==
=== China vs. Thailand ===
China
4
Tianjin Tennis Stadium, Tianjin, China
30 April–2 May 1993
Hard (indoors)

Thailand
1

			1	2	3	4	5
1	(China) (Thailand)	Xia Jiaping; Woraphol Thongkhamchu	6; 4	6; 4	7; 5
2	(China) (Thailand)	Zhang Jiuhua; Tanakorn Srichaphan	7^{7} 6^{4}	6; 1	6; 0
3	(China) (Thailand)	Pan Bing / Xia Jiaping; Vittaya Samrej / Narathorn Srichaphan	6; 3	6; 1	6^{4} 7^{7}	7^{7} 6^{2}
4	(China) (Thailand)	Xia Jiaping; Tanakorn Srichaphan	6; 3	6; 4
5	(China) (Thailand)	Zhang Jiuhua; Woraphol Thongkhamchu	7; 5	7^{7} 6^{3}
