= Sabine Gerke =

German tennis player

- Full name: Sabine Gerke-Hochdörffer
- Country (sports): West Germany; Germany
- Born: 15 November 1971 (age 54)
- Retired: 1997
- Prize money: $39,093

Singles
- Career record: 104–82
- Career titles: 4 ITF
- Highest ranking: No. 187 (11 February 1991)

Doubles
- Career record: 26–23
- Career titles: 3 ITF
- Highest ranking: No. 326 (31 July 1995)
Medal record
Representing Germany
Summer Universiade
Bronze medal – third place	1993 Buffalo	Doubles
Bronze medal – third place	1995 Fukuoka	Doubles

Sabine Gerke-Hochdörffer (born 15 November 1971) is a German former professional tennis player.

== Biography ==
Gerke, who grew up in Zweibrücken, made her WTA Tour main-draw debut at the 1989 German Open, where she took 11th seed Bettina Fulco to three sets in a first-round loss. In 1990, she won an ITF tournament in Madeira, the first of her four ITF singles titles. She reached her career best ranking of 187 in 1991, after making the second round of the Oslo Open. A two-time Universiade medalist for Germany, she won doubles bronze medals at both the 1993 and 1995 tournaments.

She is married to Jörg Hochdörffer and lives in Bad Laasphe.

== ITF finals ==
Legend
$25,000 tournaments
$10,000 tournaments

=== Singles (4–3) ===
Result	No.	Date	Tournament	Surface	Opponent	Score
Win	1.	15 October 1990	Madeira, Portugal	Hard	(Netherlands) Petra Kamstra	6–1, 6–1
Loss	2.	3 September 1990	Arzachena, Italy	Clay	(Italy) Laura Golarsa	6–7, 6–7
Win	3.	30 August 1993	Bad Nauheim, Germany	Clay	(Slovakia) Zuzana Nemšáková	6–1, 6–2
Win	4.	5 September 1994	Southsea, United Kingdom	Grass	(Germany) Cornelia Grünes	6–1, 6–3
Win	5.	13 February 1995	Sunderland, United Kingdom	Hard (i)	(Russia) Maria Marfina	6–2, 6–4
Loss	6.	30 June 1996	Velp, Netherlands	Clay	(Belgium) Daphne van de Zande	5–7, 5–7
Loss	7.	1 July 1996	Heerhugowaard, Netherlands	Clay	(Czech Republic) Denisa Sobotková	5–7, 4–6

=== Doubles (3–1) ===
Result	No.	Date	Tournament	Surface	Partner	Opponents	Score
Win	1.	15 August 1994	Bergisch Gladbach, Germany	Clay	(Austria) Elisabeth Habeler	(South Africa) Nannie de Villiers (Colombia) Carmina Giraldo	6–3, 6–2
Win	2.	29 August 1994	London, United Kingdom	Grass	(United States) Kristine Kurth	(Finland) Linda Jansson (Sweden) Anna-Karin Svensson	6–4, 6–4
Win	3.	6 March 1995	Buchen, Germany	Carpet (i)	(Czech Republic) Olga Hostáková	(Netherlands) Mariëlle Bruens (Netherlands) Anique Snijders	6–1, 6–2
Loss	4.	1 July 1996	Heerhugowaard, Netherlands	Clay	(Australia) Anna Klim	(Netherlands) Mariëlle Bruens (Netherlands) Debby Haak	6–1, 0–6, 2–6
