= Kaoru Shibata =

Japanese tennis player (born 1973)

- Full name: Kaoru Shibata
- Country (sports): Japan
- Born: 25 June 1973 (age 53) Tokyo, Japan
- Prize money: $52,885

Singles
- Highest ranking: No. 252 (30 September 1996)

Doubles
- Highest ranking: No. 117 (22 September 1997)
Medal record
Representing Japan
Summer Universiade
Gold medal – first place	1995 Fukuoka	Singles
Silver medal – second place	1993 Buffalo	Singles

Kaoru Shibata (born 25 June 1973) is a former professional tennis player from Japan.

== Biography ==
Shibata was born in Tokyo, but grew up in the United States, where she moved to as a child in 1975. She attended Libertyville High School in Chicago.

During the 1990s she competed on the professional tour, reaching career best rankings of 252 in singles and 117 in doubles.

At the 1995 Summer Universiade in Fukuoka she won a gold medal in the singles competition.

== ITF finals ==
$50,000 tournaments
$25,000 tournaments

=== Doubles (3–2) ===
Result	No.	Date	Tournament	Surface	Partner	Opponents	Score
Win	1.	4 May 1997	Gifu, Japan	Hard	(Japan) Saori Obata	(Japan) Shinobu Asagoe (Japan) Yasuko Nishimata	6–3, 7–5
Loss	1	19 May 1997	Sochi, Russia	Hard	(Georgia (country)) Nino Louarsabishvili	(Russia) Evgenia Kulikovskaya (Russia) Ekaterina Sysoeva	6–3, 3–6, 0–6
Win	2.	27 July 1997	Peachtree City, United States	Hard	(Canada) Sonya Jeyaseelan	(United Kingdom) Julie Pullin (United Kingdom) Amanda Wainwright	6–4, 6–1
Loss	2.	3 August 1997	Lexington, United States	Hard	(Slovenia) Katarina Srebotnik	(United States) Elly Hakami (Australia) Danielle Jones	2–6, 5–7
Win	3.	8 June 1998	Sochi, Russia	Hard	(Japan) Saori Obata	(Georgia (country)) Nino Louarsabishvili (Ukraine) Elena Tatarkova	3–6, 6–4, 6–2
