= Tennis at the 1995 Summer Universiade =

The tennis competition during the 1995 Summer Universiade (also known as the XVIII Summer Universiade) took place in Fukuoka, Japan from August 24 till August 30, 1995.

== Medal summary ==
Event	Gold	Silver	Bronze
Men's Singles	Yoon Yong-il (KOR)	Lee Hyung-taik (KOR)	Francesco Michelotti (ITA)
Men's Singles	Yoon Yong-il (KOR)	Lee Hyung-taik (KOR)	Kotaro Miyachi (JPN)
Men's Doubles	David Caldwell and Paul Goldstein (USA)	Nicholas Adams and Richard Holden (GBR)	Igor Tchelichev and Andrei Stolyarov (RUS)
Men's Doubles	David Caldwell and Paul Goldstein (USA)	Nicholas Adams and Richard Holden (GBR)	Xavier Avila and Fermín Novillo (ESP)
Women's Singles	Kaoru Shibata (JPN)	Rika Hiraki (JPN)	Wang Shi-ting (TPE)
Women's Singles	Kaoru Shibata (JPN)	Rika Hiraki (JPN)	Kelly Pace (USA)
Women's Doubles	Rika Hiraki and Shinobu Asagoe (JPN)	Wang Shi-ting and Liu Houng-lan (TPE)	Son Hyun-hee and Shin Hyun-a (KOR)
Women's Doubles	Rika Hiraki and Shinobu Asagoe (JPN)	Wang Shi-ting and Liu Houng-lan (TPE)	Sabine Gerke and Claudia Timm (GER)
Mixed Doubles	Chen Chih-jung and Wang Shi-ting (TPE)	Paul Robinson and Sam Smith (GBR)	Igor Tchelichev and Olga Ivanova (RUS)
Mixed Doubles	Chen Chih-jung and Wang Shi-ting (TPE)	Paul Robinson and Sam Smith (GBR)	Baek Seung-bok and Son Hyun-hee (KOR)

== Medal table ==
Rank	Nation	Gold	Silver	Bronze	Total
1	Japan (JPN)	2	1	1	4
2	South Korea (KOR)	1	1	2	4
3	Chinese Taipei (TPE)	1	1	1	3
4	United States (USA)	1	0	1	2
5	Great Britain (GBR)	0	2	0	2
6	Russia (RUS)	0	0	2	2
7	Germany (GER)	0	0	1	1
7	Italy (ITA)	0	0	1	1
7	Spain (ESP)	0	0	1	1
Totals (9 entries)		5	5	10	20

== See also ==
- Tennis at the Summer Universiade
