= Samantha Smith (tennis) =

English professional tennis player

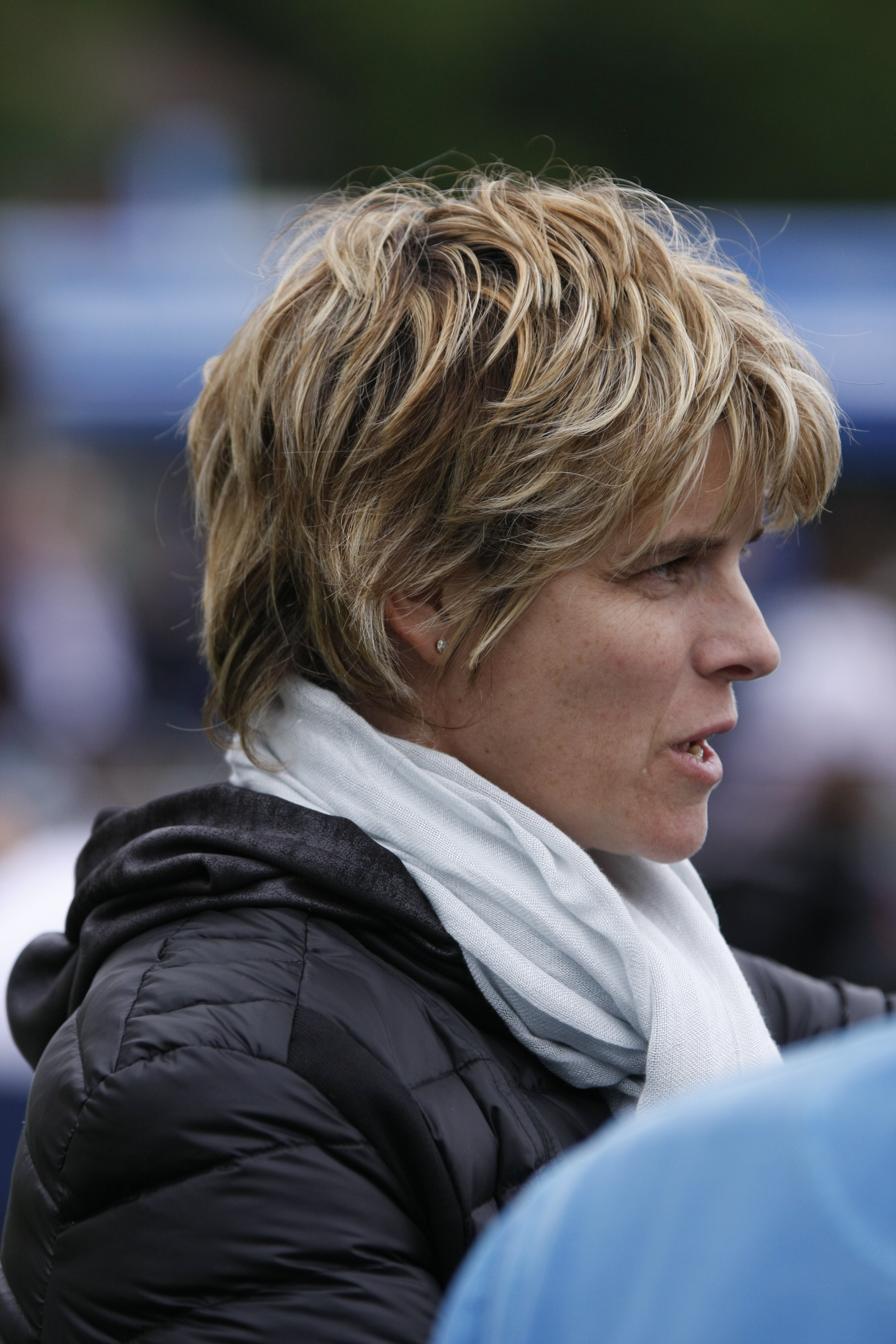
- Smith at the 2014 Aegon International
- Country (sports): United Kingdom
- Residence: Loughton, Essex, England
- Born: 27 November 1971 (age 54) Epping, Essex, England
- Height: 1.75 m (5 ft 9 in)
- Plays: Right-handed
- Prize money: $351,902

Singles
- Career record: 199–160
- Career titles: 3 ITF
- Highest ranking: No. 55 (22 February 1999)

Grand Slam singles results
- Australian Open: 2R (1999)
- French Open: 1R (1991, 1999)
- Wimbledon: 4R (1998)
- US Open: 2R (1997)

Doubles
- Career record: 54–75
- Career titles: 5 ITF
- Highest ranking: No. 126 (25 June 1990)

Grand Slam doubles results
- Australian Open: 1R (1998)
- Wimbledon: 1R (1996, 1997, 1998, 1999, 2000)

Team competitions
- Fed Cup: 10–5
Medal record
Representing Great Britain
Women's Tennis
Summer Universiade
Silver medal – second place	1995 Fukuoka	Mixed doubles
Bronze medal – third place	1993 Buffalo	Women's Singles

Samantha Smith (born 27 November 1971) is an English former professional tennis player, who was the British ladies' No. 1 from 1996 to 1999. She now commentates on the game, predominantly for the BBC, ITV, Sky Sports, BT Sport, Eurosport & Amazon Prime and for 17 consecutive years since 2009 in Australia on the Australian Open for the Seven Network and since 2019 the Nine Network.

== Early life ==
Smith was born in Epping, Essex and was educated at Bancroft's School. She took three years out of tennis (1992–1995) to attend the University of Exeter where she attained an upper second class Honours degree in history.

== Tennis career ==
Smith competed on the WTA Tour from 1990 to 1992 and from 1995 to 2000. Her highest achievement was in reaching the fourth round at the Wimbledon Championships in 1998, when she beat Anne-Gaëlle Sidot, Mariana Díaz Oliva and former champion Conchita Martínez before losing to eventual runner up Nathalie Tauziat. In so doing, she picked up an ankle injury that required her to have two operations and spend four months in plaster; this effectively ended her career. She peaked at No. 55 in the WTA rankings before the injury curtailed her climb up the rankings.

At the Australian Open, she competed in the first round of the women's doubles competition in 1992 (with Ilana Berger), and reached the second round in 1999.

At the French Open at Roland Garros, she competed in the first round in 1991 and 1999.

At Wimbledon, she competed eight times and reached the fourth round in 1998. At the US Open, she competed in the first round in 1998 and reached the second round in 1997. At the 1992 Barcelona Olympics she reached the second round.

Smith won a silver medal in the mixed doubles at the 1995 Universiade (World University Games) in Fukuoka, Japan, partnering Paul Robinson. She also reached the quarterfinals in the singles.

She won the ITF tournaments at Nottingham in 1995 (singles and doubles) and Frinton-on-Sea in 2000. She represented Britain in the Fed Cup and European Cup in 1991 and from 1996 to 1999. She was unbeaten in her five singles matches in the 1997 Fed Cup.

== Media career ==
Smith has worked for BBC Sport on a number of Summer Olympics. Smith provided commentary for tennis matches at both the Beijing 2008 and London 2012 Games. At the Tokyo 2020 and Paris 2024 Olympics, Smith not only commentated on tennis matches but also on badminton and table tennis.

== ITF finals ==
$75,000 tournaments
$50,000 tournaments
$25,000 tournaments
$10,000 tournaments

=== Singles (3–4) ===
Result	No.	Date	Tournament	Surface	Opponent	Score
Loss	1.	24 April 1989	Sutton, United Kingdom	Clay	(Japan) Kimiko Date	2–6, 1–6
Loss	2.	2 September 1991	Arzachena, Italy	Hard	(Italy) Katia Piccolini	2–6, 7–6, 4–6
Loss	3.	4 November 1991	Manchester, UK	Carpet (i)	(United Kingdom) Amanda Grunfeld	6–4, 4–6, 2–6
Win	1.	2 October 1995	Nottingham, UK	Hard (i)	(United Kingdom) Abigail Tordoff	6–4, 6–2
Loss	4.	10 February 1996	Sunderland, UK	Hard (i)	(Romania) Raluca Sandu	6–4, 5–7, 4–6
Win	2.	8 February 1999	Rockford, United States	Hard (i)	(Switzerland) Miroslava Vavrinec	6–4, 6–4
Win	3.	23 July 2000	Frinton-on-Sea, UK	Grass	(United Kingdom) Helen Crook	6–3, 6–0

=== Doubles (5–2) ===
Result	No.	Date	Tournament	Surface	Partner	Opponents	Score
Win	1.	13 August 1990	Brasília, Brazil	Clay	(Denmark) Sofie Albinus	(Brazil) Luciana Tella (Brazil) Andrea Vieira	7–6^{(7–2)}, 4–6, 6–3
Win	2.	11 February 1991	Key Biscayne, US	Hard	(United States) Penny Barg	(Canada) Rene Simpson (Netherlands) Hellas ter Riet	7–5, 6–2
Win	3.	25 September 1995	Telford, UK	Hard (i)	(United Kingdom) Jane Wood	(United Kingdom) Kaye Hand (Sweden) Anna-Karin Svensson	4–6, 7–6^{(8–6)}, 6–3
Loss	1.	2 October 1995	Nottingham, UK	Hard (i)	(United Kingdom) Jane Wood	(Sweden) Sofia Finér (Sweden) Annica Lindstedt	6–7^{(7–9)}, 5–7
Win	4.	2 August 1998	Salt Lake City, US	Hard	(South Africa) Mariaan de Swardt	(South Africa) Liezel Horn (Austria) Karin Kschwendt	6–2, 6–2
Loss	2.	25 October 1998	Welwyn, UK	Carpet (i)	(Australia) Louise Pleming	(Belgium) Laurence Courtois (Slovenia) Tina Križan	6–7, 4–6
Win	5.	21 February 1999	Midland, US	Hard (i)	(South Africa) Liezel Horn	(Germany) Kirstin Freye (Canada) Sonya Jeyaseelan	7–6^{(8–6)}, 0–6, 7–5
