= Martin Dvořáček =

Czech tennis player (born 1972)

- Country (sports): Czech Republic
- Born: 15 November 1972 (age 52); Brno, Czechoslovakia

Singles
- Highest ranking: No. 717 (31 July 1995)

Doubles
- Career record: 0–1
- Highest ranking: No. 409 (10 July 1995)
Medal record
Universiade
Silver medal – second place	1993 Buffalo	Men's doubles
Silver medal – second place	1997 Catania	Men's doubles

Martin Dvořáček (born 15 November 1972) is a Czech former professional tennis player.

Born in Brno, Dvořáček made appearances on the satellite tour during the early 1990s.

Dvořáček joined Oklahoma State University in 1996 and formed a doubles partnership with countryman Pavel Kudrnáč which would top the collegiate rankings. He was a two-time doubles silver medalist at the World University Games.

Following his time in Oklahoma he ended up in New York and was a local wildcard entrant in doubles for the 2001 Hamlet Cup, an ATP Tour tournament on Long Island.

Dvořáček is married to former professional tennis player Veronika Dvořáčková (nee Šafářová) and both teach tennis at The Powelton Club in Newburgh, New York. His sister in law is Lucie Šafářová.
