= Tennis at the 1993 Summer Universiade =

Tennis events were contested at the 1993 Summer Universiade in Buffalo, New York, United States.

== Medal summary ==
| Event | Gold | Silver | Bronze |
|---|---|---|---|
| Men's Singles | Shin Han-cheol (KOR) | Jeffrey Hunter (GBR) | Yoon Bok-kyu (KOR) |
| Men's Singles | Shin Han-cheol (KOR) | Jeffrey Hunter (GBR) | Zhang Jiuhua (CHN) |
| Men's Doubles | Kim Nam-hun and Gong Tae-hui (KOR) | Martin Dvořáček and Robert Jahl (CZE) | Robert Janecek and Jamie Laschinger (CAN) |
| Men's Doubles | Kim Nam-hun and Gong Tae-hui (KOR) | Martin Dvořáček and Robert Jahl (CZE) | Rob Givone and Michael Sell (USA) |
| Women's Singles | Yi Jingqian (CHN) | Kaoru Shibata (JPN) | Olivia Gravereaux (FRA) |
| Women's Singles | Yi Jingqian (CHN) | Kaoru Shibata (JPN) | Samantha Smith (GBR) |
| Women's Doubles | Chen Li and Yi Jingqian (CHN) | Nao Akahori and Rika Hiraki (JPN) | Alexandra Boutelier and Olivia Gravereaux (FRA) |
| Women's Doubles | Chen Li and Yi Jingqian (CHN) | Nao Akahori and Rika Hiraki (JPN) | Sabine Gerke and Eva-Maria Schürhoff (GER) |
| Mixed Doubles | Rika Hiraki and Natsuki Harada (JPN) | Karina Kuregian and Sargis Sargsian (ARM) | Virág Csurgó and András Lányi (HUN) |
| Mixed Doubles | Rika Hiraki and Natsuki Harada (JPN) | Karina Kuregian and Sargis Sargsian (ARM) | Patrícia Marková and Roman Šmotlák (SVK) |

== Medal table ==
| Rank | Nation | Gold | Silver | Bronze | Total |
|---|---|---|---|---|---|
| 1 | China (CHN) | 2 | 0 | 1 | 3 |
| 1 | South Korea (KOR) | 2 | 0 | 1 | 3 |
| 3 | Japan (JPN) | 1 | 2 | 0 | 3 |
| 4 | Great Britain (GBR) | 0 | 1 | 1 | 2 |
| 5 | Armenia (ARM) | 0 | 1 | 0 | 1 |
| 5 | Czech Republic (CZE) | 0 | 1 | 0 | 1 |
| 7 | France (FRA) | 0 | 0 | 2 | 2 |
| 8 | Canada (CAN) | 0 | 0 | 1 | 1 |
| 8 | Germany (GER) | 0 | 0 | 1 | 1 |
| 8 | Hungary (HUN) | 0 | 0 | 1 | 1 |
| 8 | Slovakia (SVK) | 0 | 0 | 1 | 1 |
| 8 | United States (USA) | 0 | 0 | 1 | 1 |
| Totals (12 entries) | | 5 | 5 | 10 | 20 |

== See also ==
- Tennis at the Summer Universiade
