= Tennis at the 1983 Summer Universiade =

The tennis competitions at the 1983 Summer Universiade were held at the University of Alberta's Michener Park, in Edmonton, Alberta, Canada, in July 1983.

== Medal summary ==
| Event | Gold | Silver | Bronze |
|---|---|---|---|
| Men's Singles | Richard Gallien (USA) | Dan Goldie (USA) | Alexander Zverev (URS) |
| Men's Doubles | Jeff Arons and John Sevely (USA) | Angelo Binaghi and Raimondo Ricci Bitti (ITA) | Laurențiu Bucur and Adrian Marcu (ROU) |
| Women's Singles | Cecilia Fernandez (USA) | Olga Zaytseva (URS) | Lucia Romanov (ROU) |
| Women's Doubles | Karen Dewis and Jill Hetherington (CAN) | Junko Kimura and Kumiko Okamoto (JPN) | Svetlana Cherneva and Olga Zaytseva (URS) |
| Mixed Doubles | Jill Hetherington and Bill Jenkins (CAN) | Cornelia Dries and Jochen Settlemayer (FRG) | Svetlana Cherneva and Yury Filev (URS) |

== Medal table ==
| Rank | Nation | Gold | Silver | Bronze | Total |
|---|---|---|---|---|---|
| 1 | United States (USA) | 3 | 1 | 0 | 4 |
| 2 | Canada (CAN) | 2 | 0 | 0 | 2 |
| 3 | Soviet Union (URS) | 0 | 1 | 3 | 4 |
| 4 | Italy (ITA) | 0 | 1 | 0 | 1 |
| 4 | Japan (JPN) | 0 | 1 | 0 | 1 |
| 4 | West Germany (FRG) | 0 | 1 | 0 | 1 |
| 7 | Romania (ROU) | 0 | 0 | 2 | 2 |
| Totals (7 entries) | | 5 | 5 | 5 | 15 |

== See also ==
- Tennis at the Summer Universiade
