= Olivia Féry =

French tennis player

- Country (sports): France; Hong Kong
- Born: 27 April 1973 (age 53)
- Retired: 2000
- Prize money: $18,914

Singles
- Career record: 33–25
- Career titles: 2 ITF
- Highest ranking: No. 225 (10 June 1991)

Doubles
- Career record: 15–18
- Career titles: 0
- Highest ranking: No. 218 (30 September 1991)

Grand Slam doubles results
- French Open: 1R (1991)

Team competitions
- Fed Cup: 0–4
Medal record
Representing France
Summer Universiade
Bronze medal – third place	1993 Buffalo	Singles
Bronze medal – third place	1993 Buffalo	Doubles

Olivia Féry (née Gravereaux; born 27 April 1973) is a French former tennis player, who also represented Hong Kong during parts of her professional career.

== Education ==
Féry attended the University of Arizona. Féry is a graduate of HEC Paris, a private business school.

== Career ==
Féry, who competed under her maiden name Gravereaux, played briefly on the professional tour in the early 1990s, with a best singles ranking of 225 in the world. She reached the final qualifying round of the 1990 French Open women's singles and featured in the main draw of the women's doubles at the 1991 French Open, as a wildcard pairing with Alexandra Fusai. She won singles and doubles bronze medals at the 1993 Summer Universiade, held in the American city of Buffalo. Féry played some college tennis for the Arizona Wildcats of the University of Arizona.

While a resident of Hong Kong, Féry won a national championship in 1998 and represented the Hong Kong Fed Cup team. She appeared in three Fed Cup ties, against Kazakhstan, Japan and Thailand, all in 2000.

== Personal life ==
For 21 years she was married to Loïc Féry, a French businessman and president of football club Lorient.

She and Féry have three children: Arthur, Albane and Maxime. Arthur is a professional tennis player and plays on the ATP Tour.

== ITF finals ==
Legend
$25,000 tournaments
$10,000 tournaments

=== Singles (2–0) ===
Result	No.	Date	Tournament	Surface	Opponent	Score
Win	1.	29 October 1990	Meknes, Morocco	Clay	(France) Barbara Collet	6–1, 6–2
Win	2.	5 November 1990	Fez, Morocco	Clay	(Netherlands) Esmir Hoogendoorn	1–6, 6–3, 7–6^{(11–9)}

=== Doubles (0–2) ===
Result	No.	Date	Tournament	Surface	Partner	Opponents	Score
Loss	1.	2 July 1990	Cherbourg, France	Clay	(France) Alexandra Fusai	(West Germany) Cora Linneman (Australia) Louise Pleming	4–6, 3–6
Loss	2.	24 June 1991	Caltagirone, Italy	Hard	(France) Alexandra Fusai	(Italy) Silvia Farina Elia (Japan) Misumi Miyauchi	7–6, 4–6, 4–6
