= Richard Gallien =

American tennis player and coach

- Country (sports): United States
- College: Pepperdine University

Singles
- Career record: 1–1
- Highest ranking: No. 433 (Nov 26, 1984)
Medal record
Universiade
Gold medal – first place	1983 Edmonton	Men's singles

Richard Gallien is an American college tennis coach and former professional player.

Raised in Sunland, Los Angeles, Gallien won a City section singles title while a senior at Verdugo Hills High School.

Gallien played collegiate tennis for Pepperdine University, where he twice earned All-American honors. He was a member of the team which finished as runners-up in the 1982 NCAA championships. In 1983 represented the U.S. at the World University Games and won the singles final against Dan Goldie to become the first American tennis singles gold medalist in games history (along with Cecilia Fernandez who won the women's event).

Competing briefly in professional tennis, Gallien had a best singles world ranking of 433. He featured in the main draw of the 1983 Pacific Southwest Open and had a win over Ben Testerman, before falling to world number six Gene Mayer.

Gallien was head coach of the USC Trojans women's team for 22-years, from 1995 to 2017, during which time he was named Pac-12 Coach of the Year on five occasions. He is a former men's co-head coach of Pepperdine (with Allen Fox from 1988 to 1990) and is now the women's head coach of Cal State LA.
