= Xavier Avila =

Spanish tennis player (born 1973)

- Full name: Xavier Avila Bonastre
- Country (sports): Spain
- Born: 10 December 1973 (age 52) Lleida, Spain
- Height: 6 ft 0 in (183 cm)

Singles
- Career record: 0–1
- Highest ranking: No. 354 (14 Sep 1992)

Doubles
- Highest ranking: No. 502 (8 Feb 1993)
Medal record
Representing Spain
Summer Universiade
Bronze medal – third place	1995 Fukuoka	Doubles

Xavier Avila Bonastre (born 10 December 1973) is a Spanish former professional tennis player.

Born in the Catalan city of Lleida, Avila made his only ATP Tour main draw appearance at the 1993 Torneo Godó in Barcelona. A wildcard in the singles draw, he lost his first round match to Juan Albert Viloca in three sets.

In 1995 he represented Spain at the Universiade in Fukuoka and won a bronze medal for doubles.

Avila played collegiate tennis for the University of Kansas, earning singles All-American honors in 1997.
