= Loïc Féry =

French businessman (born 1974)

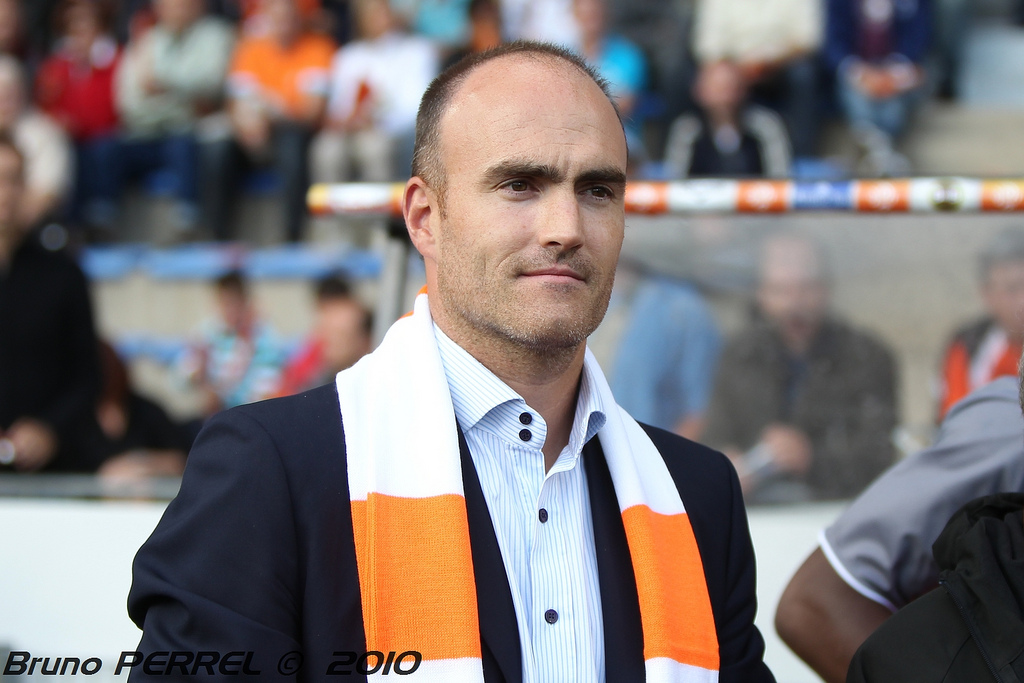
- Féry in 2010
- Born: 15 March 1974 (age 52); Nancy, France
- Education: HEC Paris
- Occupation: Businessman
- Known for: President of FC Lorient
- Spouse: Olivia Gravereaux (m. 2001; div. 2022)
- Children: 3, including Arthur

Loïc Féry (born 15 March 1974) is a French businessman. He worked as a credit trader in Hong Kong and the City of London from 1997 to 2007, for Société Générale and Crédit Agricole. He founded the investment firm Chenavari Investment Managers in 2007. He became the owner and president of FC Lorient in 2009, selling the club in 2026 while remaining president.

== Early life and education ==
Féry was born in Nancy. He grew up in Pont-à-Mousson, also in Lorraine, where his parents were teachers; his father in mathematics, his mother in physical education. He achieved a Bac C (now Baccalauréat scientifique) with the mention très bien grade. He attended preparatory classes at Lycée du Parc in Lyon and graduated from HEC Paris.

Aged 19, Féry took a year out of his studies after his first year at HEC to lead a telematics project in Eastern Europe, having won an entrepreneurial competition. He then had a six-month internship in a trading room.

== Career ==
=== Financial markets ===
Féry worked as a credit trader in Hong Kong, moving there in September 1997 during the Asian financial crisis. He was put in charge of credit markets in South East Asia for Société Générale, remaining there until 2000. He then started a company called Asiabooster to incubate European start-ups in the continent. His first company fell to the Dot-com bubble.

Having returned to Europe in 2001, Féry settled in London. His former boss at Société Générale set him the task of setting up Crédit Agricole's business in the British capital, leading 150 people in 2006. In March 2007, he was the highest paid person in the company. Four months later, with the company now known as Calyon after its merger with Crédit Lyonnais, one of Féry's subordinates lost €200 million on the New York stock exchange. Féry was fired in September

Before the end of 2007, Féry set up the hedge fund Chenavari Investment Managers, named after a peak visible from his childhood home. As of 2020, Chenavari had $5 billion in assets.

=== FC Lorient ===
Féry considered buying OGC Nice, Nîmes Olympique, Grenoble Foot 38 and Sheffield Wednesday before buying FC Lorient in 2009. The Nice offer in 2001 was with a Korean business partner, and was rejected for lack of transparency, while the president of Nîmes changed his mind as his club was promoted to Ligue 2, and Wednesday was considered too expensive and risky for Féry. Aged 35, he was the youngest president in Ligue 1. As of 2012, Lorient was the only Ligue 1 club not in debt.

In late 2012, Féry was elected president of the administration council of the Ligue de Football Professionnel. In July 2018, he and Francis Graille of AJ Auxerre were elected presidents of the same body for Ligue 2 clubs.

Féry's club were relegated back to Ligue 2 in 2017. After achieving promotion back to Ligue 1 in 2020, he invested heavily, saying that only Paris Saint-Germain and Nice were spending as much. In July 2023, he received attention for signing 2018 FIFA World Cup winner Benjamin Mendy days after the player was acquitted of sexual offences in England. Lorient were relegated again from the 2023–24 Ligue 1, despite having the eighth-biggest budget. Féry admitted responsibility for Lorient's relegation and the mistake of abolishing the role of sporting director, which had left coach Régis Le Bris with the added role of player recruitment.

In January 2026, with Lorient back in Ligue 1, the Black Knight Football Club of American businessman Bill Foley became the sole shareholder; the organisation already owned AFC Bournemouth in England, Moreirense in Portugal and Auckland FC in New Zealand. Féry remained president, and became a shareholder in the parent company.

== Personal life ==
Féry married to Olivia Féry (née Gravereaux), a former professional tennis player, in 2001. They divorced in 2022. They have three children, including Arthur, who became a professional in tennis under his British nationality.

According to French business magazine Challenges, Féry was France's 398th richest person in 2023, with a net worth of €320 million. This was an increase from his €120 million fortune in 2011.
