= András Lányi =

Hungarian tennis player

- Country (sports): Hungary
- Born: 26 November 1969 (age 55)
- Plays: Right-handed
- College: USC Trojans
- Prize money: $17,276

Singles
- Career record: 4–8 (at ATP Tour level, Grand Slam level)
- Career titles: 0
- Highest ranking: No. 374 (19 June 1989)

Doubles
- Career record: 5–4 (at ATP Tour level, Grand Slam level)
- Career titles: 3 Satellite
- Highest ranking: No. 194 (6 February 1995)

Grand Slam mixed doubles results
- French Open: 1R (1986)

Team competitions
- Davis Cup: 12–13
Medal record
Representing Hungary
Tennis
Universiade
Bronze medal – third place	1993 Buffalo	mixed doubles
- Last updated on: 1 February 2018.

András Lányi (born 26 November 1969) is a retired Hungarian tennis player.

Lányi has a career high ATP singles ranking of 374 achieved on 19 June 1989. He also has a career high ATP doubles ranking of 194, achieved on 6 February 1995. Lányi has won 3 ITF Satellite tournament doubles title.

Lányi has represented Hungary at Davis Cup, where he has a win–loss record of 12–13.

He was studied at University of Southern California, between 1989 and 1993. He won the NCAA Men's Team Championship in 1993 with Trojans. His teammates was Wayne Black, David Ekerot, Jon Leach, Brian MacPhie and Kent Seton, and they earned All-America selection that year.

He competed at the 1993 Summer Universiade. In mixed doubles he won bronze medal with Virág Csurgó.

== Satellite and Challenger finals ==
=== Singles: 1 (0–1) ===
Legend (singles) ATP Challenger Tour (0–0) ITF Satellites (0–1)	Titles by surface Hard (0–0) Clay (0–1) Grass (0–0) Carpet (0–0)

Result	W–L	Date	Tournament	Tier	Surface	Opponent	Score
Loss	0–1	Jul 1993	Seefeld, Austria	Satellite	Clay	(Austria) Martin Schäffl	4–6, 4–6

=== Doubles 8 (3–5) ===
Legend (doubles) ATP Challenger Tour (0–2) ITF Satellites (3–3)	Titles by surface Hard (0–0) Clay (3–5) Grass (0–0) Carpet (0–0)

Result	W–L	Date	Tournament	Tier	Surface	Partner	Opponents	Score
Loss	0–1	Aug 1988	Rümikon, Switzerland	Challenger	Clay	(Hungary) László Markovits	(Sweden) Jan Apell (Finland) Veli Paloheimo	5–7, 7–6, 3–6
Loss	0–2	Sep 1988	Thessaloniki, Greece	Challenger	Clay	(Switzerland) Stefano Mezzadri	(Denmark) Morten Christensen (New Zealand) Steve Guy	3–6, 4–6
Loss	0–3	Jun 1991	Érd, Hungary	Satellite	Clay	(Czechoslovakia) Tibor Tóth	(Bulgaria) Ivan Keskinov (Hungary) József Krocskó	1–6, 6–7
Win	1–3	Jun 1991	Agárd, Hungary	Satellite	Clay	(Czechoslovakia) Tibor Tóth	(Czechoslovakia) Branislav Gálik (Germany) Robert Kraus	7–5, 6–2
Loss	1–4	Aug 1993	Pécs, Hungary	Satellite	Clay	(Slovakia) Tibor Tóth	(Czech Republic) Petr Pála (United Kingdom) Andrew Richardson	3–6, 6–3, 4–6
Win	2–4	Jan 1994	Cairo, Egypt	Satellite	Clay	(Sweden) David Ekerot	(France) Pierre Bouteyre (France) Nicolas Sabas	6–1, 6–3
Win	3–4	Jan 1994	Cairo, Egypt	Satellite	Clay	(Sweden) David Ekerot	(United Kingdom) Jeffrey Hunter (United Kingdom) Danny Sapsford	6–0, 7–6
Loss	3–5	Feb 1994	Cairo, Egypt	Satellite	Clay	(Sweden) David Ekerot	(South Africa) Neville Godwin (South Africa) Gareth Williams	6–7, 2–6

== Davis Cup ==
=== Participations: (12–13) ===
Group membership World Group (0–0) WG playoff (1–1) Group I (11–12) Group II (0–0) Group III (0–0) Group IV (0–0)	Matches by surface Hard (3–3) Clay (5–7) Grass (0–0) Carpet (4–3)	Matches by type Singles (6–10) Doubles (6–3)

- ▲ ▼ indicates the outcome of the Davis Cup match followed by the score, date, place of event, the zonal classification and its phase, and the court surface.

Rubber outcome	No.	Rubber	Match type (partner if any)	Opponent nation	Opponent player(s)	Score
▼0–5; 12–14 June 1987; Estádio Nacional, Lisbon, Portugal; European Zone (Zone B) quarterfinal; clay surface
Defeat	1	I	Singles	Portugal	João Cunha e Silva	4–6, 4–6, 7–5, 6–8
Defeat	2	III	Doubles (with Sándor Kiss)	Portugal	Pedro Cordeiro / João Cunha e Silva	2–6, 9–7, 4–6, 2–6
Defeat	3	IV	Singles (dead rubber)	Portugal	Nuno Marques	0–6, 6–4, 2–6
▼0–5; 6–8 May 1988; Lagos, Nigeria; European Zone Group I quarterfinal; hard surface
Defeat	4	I	Singles	Nigeria	Nduka Odizor	7–5, 3–6, 3–6, 1–6
Defeat	5	III	Doubles (with László Markovits)	Nigeria	Tony Mmoh / Nduka Odizor	5–7, 3–6, 6–2, 4–6
Defeat	6	V	Singles (dead rubber)	Nigeria	Tony Mmoh	6–4, 3–6, 5–7
▲3–2; 10–13 June 1988; Margaret Island, Budapest, Hungary; European Group I Zone A relegation playoff; clay surface
Victory	7	I	Singles	Belgium	Bart Wuyts	6–3, 6–4, 6–3
Victory	8	V	Singles	Belgium	Xavier Daufresne	6–4, 5–7, 6–2, 6–1
▲4–1; 3–5 February 1989; City Sports Centre, Harare, Zimbabwe; Euro/African Group I Zone A first round; hard (i) surface
Victory	9	II	Singles	Zimbabwe	Byron Black	6–3, 2–6, 7–6^{(7–4)}, 4–6, 6–3
Victory	10	III	Doubles (with László Markovits)	Zimbabwe	Byron Black / Greig Rodger	6–2, 5–7, 1–6, 7–5, 10–8
Victory	11	IV	Singles (dead rubber)	Zimbabwe	Greig Rodger	6–2, 6–2
▲4–1; 5–7 May 1989; Dózsa Stadium, Budapest, Hungary; Euro/African Group I Zone A second round; clay surface
Victory	12	II	Singles	Nigeria	Sadiq Abdullahi	6–3, 6–3, 6–4
Defeat	13	IV	Singles (dead rubber)	Nigeria	Nduka Odizor	4–6, 7–6^{(7–5)}, 2–6
▼1–4; 21–23 July 1989; Chase Stadium, Auckland, New Zealand; World Group playoff; carpet (indoor) surface
Victory	14	II	Singles	New Zealand	Steve Guy	7–5, 5–7, 6–4, 6–4
Defeat	15	IV	Singles	New Zealand	Kelly Evernden	0–6, 5–7, 4–6
▼1–4; 4–6 May 1990; Royal Primrose CB, Brussels, Belgium; Euro/African Group I Zone B second round; clay surface
Defeat	16	II	Singles	Belgium	Bart Wuyts	1–6, 1–6, 2–6
Victory	17	III	Doubles (with László Markovits)	Belgium	Xavier Daufresne / Denis Langaskens	6–4, 6–3, 4–6, 7–6^{(7–3)}
Defeat	18	IV	Singles	Belgium	Eduardo Masso	2–6, 6–4, 5–7, 3–6
▼1–4; 1–3 February 1991; Vasas Sport Club, Budapest, Hungary; Euro/African Group I Zone A first round; carpet (i) surface
Defeat	19	I	Singles	Soviet Union	Andrei Cherkasov	3–6, 3–6, 3–6
Victory	20	III	Doubles (with László Markovits)	Soviet Union	Andrei Chesnokov / Dimitri Poliakov	6–3, 6–7^{(6–8)}, 6–4, 6–4
▲5–0; 3–5 May 1991; Újpesti Tennis Club, Budapest, Hungary; Euro/African Group I Zone A relegation playoff; clay surface
Victory	21	III	Doubles (with László Markovits)	Morocco	Karim Alami / Arafat Chekrouni	6–3, 6–4, 4–6, 3–6, 6–3
▲3–2; 31 January – 2 February 1992; Vasas Sports Club, Budapest, Hungary; Euro/African Group I Zone B first round; carpet (i) surface
Victory	22	III	Doubles (with László Markovits)	Poland	Wojciech Fibak / Tomasz Iwański	3–6, 7–5, 6–2, 6–2
Victory	23	V	Singles (dead rubber)	Poland	Tomasz Iwański	7–5, 6–7^{(4–7)}, 13–11
▲4–1; 26–28 March 1993; Vasas Sports Club, Budapest, Hungary; Euro/African Group I Zone B first round; carpet (i) surface
Victory	24	III	Doubles (with László Markovits)	Finland	Alexander Lindholm / Olli Rahnasto	6–4, 6–3, 7–6^{(7–5)}
▲3–2; 30 April – 2 May 1993; Újpesti Tennis Club, Budapest, Hungary; Euro/African Group I Zone B second round; clay surface
Defeat	25	III	Doubles (with László Markovits)	(United Kingdom) Great Britain	Jeremy Bates / Mark Petchey	3–6, 2–6, 4–6

== After retirement ==
He founded a financial services company in Hungary in 2004 and is still managing director. In July 2007 Lányi elected from vice-president to the Hungarian Tennis Association. In 2009 he elected for the president of Hungarian Triathlon Association and held the position until 2012.

== Sources ==
Sporting positions
Preceded by Imre Szekeres	President of the Hungarian Triathlon Association; 16 June 2009 – 18 November 2012	Succeeded by Marcell Biró
