= Paul Robinson (tennis) =

British tennis player

- Full name: Paul C. Robinson
- Country (sports): (United Kingdom) Great Britain
- Born: 22 November 1973 (age 52) Northamptonshire, England
- Plays: Left-handed

Singles
- Highest ranking: No. 482 (7 July 1997)

Grand Slam singles results
- Australian Open: Q1 (1991)
- Wimbledon: Q1 (1991)

Doubles
- Career record: 0–1
- Highest ranking: No. 289 (23 June 1997)
Medal record
Universiade
Silver medal – second place	1995 Fukuoka	Mixed doubles

Paul Robinson (born 22 November 1973) is a British former professional tennis player.

== Tennis career ==
A left-handed player from Northampton, Robinson was active on the professional tour in the 1990s. He took a set off Greg Rusedski in his semi-final loss at the national championships in 1996 and also twice broke the serve of the Canadian-born player. His only ATP Tour main draw appearance came as a doubles qualifier at the 1996 Bournemouth International, with Arvind Parmar.

Robinson played collegiate tennis for Texas Christian University, where he was a three-time All-American in both singles and doubles. He represented Great Britain at the 1995 World Student Games and won a silver medal partnering Samantha Smith in the mixed doubles.
