= Tennis at the 1967 Summer Universiade =

Tennis events were contested at the 1967 Summer Universiade in Tokyo, Japan.

== Medal summary ==
Event	Gold	Silver	Bronze
Men's Singles	Koji Watanabe (JPN)	Jun Kamiwazumi (JPN)	Hidesaburo Kuromatsu (JPN)
Men's Doubles	José María Gisbert and Juan Gisbert (ESP)	Takeshi Koura and Isao Watanabe (JPN)	Stefano Gaudenzi and Giordano Maioli (ITA)
Women's Singles	Nell Truman (GBR)	Ada Bakker (NED)	Chieko Ota (JPN)
Women's Doubles	Ada Bakker and Astrid Suurbeek (NED)	Monica Giorgi and Alessandra Gobbò (ITA)	Frances MacLennan and Nell Truman (GBR)
Mixed Doubles	Kaye Dening and Geoff Pollard (AUS)	Monica Giorgi and Giordano Maioli (ITA)	Chieko Ota and Takeshi Koura (JPN)

== Medal table ==
Rank	Nation	Gold	Silver	Bronze	Total
1	Japan (JPN)	1	2	3	6
2	Netherlands (NED)	1	1	0	2
3	Great Britain (GBR)	1	0	1	2
4	Australia (AUS)	1	0	0	1
4	Spain (ESP)	1	0	0	1
6	Italy (ITA)	0	2	1	3
Totals (6 entries)		5	5	5	15

== See also ==
- Tennis at the Summer Universiade
