= Baseball at the 1995 Summer Universiade =

Tournament details
- Country: Japan
- City: Fukuoka
- Dates: 26 August – 1 September
- Teams: 8
- Defending champions: Cuba

Final positions
- Champions: Cuba (2nd title)
- Runners-up: South Korea
- Third place: Japan
- Fourth place: United States

Baseball at the 1995 Summer Universiade was the second Universiade to include baseball as an option sport. The tournament was held in two venues in Fukuoka, Japan, and was won by defending champions Cuba for their second title.

== Teams ==
Pool A

- China
- Italy
- Japan
- United States

Pool B

- Chinese Taipei
- Cuba
- South Korea
- Mexico

== Group stage ==
=== Pool A ===
Team	Pld	W	L	RF	RA	Pct
Japan	3	3	0	31	4	1.000
United States	3	2	1	11	20	0.667
China	3	1	2	10	21	0.333
Italy	3	0	3	11	18	0

Date	Local time	Road team	Score	Home team	Inn.	Venue	Game duration	Attendance	Boxscore
August 26, 1995	14:00	Japan	6–3	Italy		Fukuoka Dome			
August 26, 1995	14:00	China	2–6	United States		Heiwadai Baseball Stadium			
August 27, 1995	18:00	Japan	10–1	China		Fukuoka Dome			
August 27, 1995	18:00	United States	5–3	Italy		Heiwadai Baseball Stadium			
August 28, 1995	14:00	Japan	15–0	United States		Fukuoka Dome			
August 28, 1995	14:00	Italy	5–7	China		Heiwadai Baseball Stadium			

=== Pool B ===
Team	Pld	W	L	RF	RA	Pct
Cuba	3	3	0	24	2	1.000
South Korea	3	2	1	10	5	0.667
Chinese Taipei	3	1	2	11	22	0.333
Mexico	3	0	3	5	21	0

Date	Local time	Road team	Score	Home team	Inn.	Venue	Game duration	Attendance	Boxscore
August 26, 1995	18:00	Cuba	12–1	Chinese Taipei		Fukuoka Dome			
August 26, 1995	19:00	Mexico	0–4	South Korea		Heiwadai Baseball Stadium			
August 27, 1995	14:00	Cuba	10–0	Mexico		Fukuoka Dome			
August 27, 1995	14:00	South Korea	5–3	Chinese Taipei		Heiwadai Baseball Stadium			
August 28, 1995	18:00	Cuba	2–1	South Korea		Fukuoka Dome			
August 28, 1995	18:00	Mexico	5–7	Chinese Taipei		Heiwadai Baseball Stadium			

== Final stage ==
=== 5th ~ 8th Place ===
Semi-finals
August 30
Italy	4
Chinese Taipei	7
August 30
China	1
Mexico	7

Final
August 31
Chinese Taipei	6
Mexico	3
Third place
August 31
Italy	0
China	9

=== 1st ~ 4th Place ===
Semi-finals
August 31
United States	0
Cuba	5
August 31
South Korea	4
Japan	1

Final
September 1
Cuba	2
South Korea	0
Third place
September 1
United States	3
Japan	7

== Final standing ==
Rank	Team
1st place, gold medalist(s)	Cuba
2nd place, silver medalist(s)	South Korea
3rd place, bronze medalist(s)	Japan
4	United States
5	Chinese Taipei
6	Mexico
7	China
8	Italy
