= Monica Giorgi =

Italian tennis player

- Full name: Monica Cerutti Giorgi
- Country (sports): Italy
- Born: 3 January 1946 (age 79); Livorno, Italy

Singles

Grand Slam singles results
- French Open: 3R (1967, 1969)
- Wimbledon: 2R (1967)

Doubles

Grand Slam doubles results
- French Open: 2R (1966)
- Wimbledon: 3R (1973)

Grand Slam mixed doubles results
- Wimbledon: 3R (1971)
Medal record
Universiade
Silver medal – second place	1967 Tokyo	Women's Doubles
Silver medal – second place	1967 Tokyo	Mixed Doubles

Monica Giorgi (born 3 January 1946) is an Italian former professional tennis player.

== Biography ==
Born in Livorno, Giorgi twice reached the third round of the French Open during her career and played one Federation Cup tie for Italy, against Australia in the 1972 World Group quarter-finals. Giorgi was very politically active and wore an anti-apartheid shirt onto the court for the tie, which was held in South Africa, for which she was briefly banned by the Italian tennis federation.

Giorgi was jailed in the early 1980s for her association with anarchist group Azione Rivoluzionaria. Authorities accused her of being involved in an attempted kidnapping, as well as attempted murder for those injured in the attempt, but she was acquitted of all these charges due to insufficient evidence. She served around two years in prison.

== See also ==
- List of Italy Fed Cup team representatives
