= Baseball at the 1993 Summer Universiade =

Baseball at the XVII Summer Universiade
- Teams: 7 (men)

Medalists
1st place, gold medalist(s)		Cuba
2nd place, silver medalist(s)		South Korea
3rd place, bronze medalist(s)		Canada

Baseball was contested at the 1993 Summer Universiade in Buffalo, United States. The tournament was only for men.

== Medal summary ==
Event	Gold	Silver	Bronze
Men	Cuba (CUB); Reina Ordonez Pereira; Lazaro Castro Cruz; Rober Colina Figueroa; Eduar Cardenas Alcala; Osnel Bocourt Gomez; Osca Valdes Rodriguez; Jorge Toca Gomez; Angel Lopez Berrio; Alexande Ramos Ravell; Jorge Garcia Solano; Edilbe Oropesa Guasch; Eduardo Paret Perez; Jua Linares Izquierdo; Yobar Duenas Martinez; Ormary Romero Turcaz; Vict Bejerano Morales; Rey Isaac Vaillant; Jose Baez Martinola; Alfre Fonseca Saborit; Ernesto Guevara Ramos; Gabriel Pierre Lazo; Teofi Perez Constante	South Korea (KOR); Shim Jae Hack; Kim Kwang Hyun; Choi Kyung Hwan; Kang Hyuk; Park Jae-Hong; Kang Sang Soo; Park Hyun Seung; Back Jae Ho; Hong Won Ki; Ryu Ji Hyun; Kang Pil-Sun; Her Mun Hoe; Kim Hyung Nam; Jin Kab Yong; Choi Ki Moon; Kim Min Kuk; Kim Young Soo; Cha Myung Ju; Cho Sung Min; Park Chan Ho; Lim Sun Dong; We Jae Young	Canada (CAN); Jeff Zimmerman; Mark Stocco; Steve Smith; Tyler Shantz; Alain Roy; Mitch Mitchell; Andy McNab; Spencer McIntyre; Tim Kroeker; Jason Gooding; Derek Gauthier; Keith Fluet; Ryan Ferby; Ryan Duffy; Damien Dubien; Leon Carter; John Cann; Jody Brown; Jason Birmingham; Mike Bennett; Rob Barber; Alex Andreopoulos

== Final standing ==
Rank	Team
1st place, gold medalist(s)	Cuba
2nd place, silver medalist(s)	South Korea
3rd place, bronze medalist(s)	Canada
4	Japan
5	Chinese Taipei
6	United States
7	Italy
