= Rob Givone =

American tennis player (born 1973)

- Full name: Robert Givone
- Country (sports): United States
- Born: May 1, 1973 (age 53)
- Height: 6 ft 4 in (193 cm)
- Plays: Right-handed
- Prize money: $23,519

Singles
- Career record: 0–2
- Highest ranking: No. 347 (August 28, 1995)

Grand Slam singles results
- Wimbledon: Q1 (1999)
- US Open: Q2 (1995, 1996)

Doubles
- Highest ranking: No. 224 (April 7, 1997)
Medal record
Summer Universiade
Bronze medal – third place	1993 Buffalo	Men's doubles

Robert Givone (born May 1, 1973) is an American former professional tennis player.

Givone, a native of Westchester (New York), turned professional in 1994 following three years of college tennis at Georgia Tech. He was a doubles bronze medalist at the University Games and on the professional tour reached a career high singles ranking of 347 in the world. His two ATP Tour main draw appearances included a first round match against Mark Philippoussis at the 1995 Legg Mason Tennis Classic, which he lost 4–6 in the third set.

A shoulder injury ended his career at the age of 26 and he now works in finance.

== ITF Futures titles ==
=== Doubles: (1) ===
No.	Date	Tournament	Surface	Partner	Opponents	Score
1.	May 1999	USA F3, Tallahassee	Clay	(United States) Glenn Weiner	(Canada) Simon Larose (Canada) Jerry Turek	4–6, 6–3, 6–2
