= Zhang Jiuhua =

Chinese tennis player

- Full name: Zhang Jiuhua
- Country (sports): China
- Born: 14 May 1969 (age 57) Hubei, China

Singles
- Highest ranking: No. 437 (19 August 1996)

Doubles
- Career record: 0–2
- Highest ranking: No. 424 (22 March 1993)
Medal record
Representing China
Asian Games
Silver medal – second place	1990 Beijing	Singles
Summer Universiade
Bronze medal – third place	1993 Buffalo	Singles

Zhang Jiuhua (born 14 May 1969) is a former professional tennis player from China.

== Biography ==
Zhang, who was born in Hubei, competed in the boys' doubles event at the 1985 US Open and reached the quarter-finals.

He won a silver medal for China in the singles at the 1990 Asian Games and was a singles bronze medalist at the 1993 Summer Universiade.

His two ATP tour main draw appearances came at the 1994 Salem Open-Beijing and 1996 Shanghai Open, both times as a wildcard in the doubles events.

During his career he represented the China Davis Cup team in six ties, with all of his ten career matches coming in singles.
