= Cecilia Fernandez-Parker =

American tennis player

- Country (sports): United States
- Born: June 28, 1963 (age 61)
- Prize money: $37,556

Singles
- Highest ranking: No. 149 (September 14, 1987)

Grand Slam singles results
- French Open: 2R (1986)

Doubles
- Highest ranking: No. 103 (June 8, 1987)
Medal record
Summer Universiade
Gold medal – first place	1983 Edmonton	Singles

Cecilia Fernandez-Parker (born June 28, 1963) is an American former professional tennis player.

== Biography ==
Fernandez grew up in Los Angeles County, one of four daughters of Ecuadorian civil engineer Carlos and Los Angeles born Dolores. The four sisters are two sets of twins who all went on to play tennis at a high level, with Cecilia and her twin sister Elisa being the youngest. Anna-Maria and Anna Lucia are the eldest twins. While at Bishop Montgomery High School in 1977, both sets of twins played each other in a CIF 4A doubles final, while the team was also coached by their mother.

In the early 1980s, Fernandez played college tennis for the USC Trojans. During this time she represented the United States in the Junior Federation Cup and won a singles gold medal at the University Games in Edmonton. A four-time All American, Fernandez was a member of USC's NCAA Division I Championship winning teams in 1983 and 1985.

Fernandez competed on the professional tour after leaving USC. She made the second round of the 1986 French Open, beating fellow Los Angeles based player Tina Mochizuki in the first round, before losing to Bulgarian Katerina Maleeva.

Retiring from the tour in 1988, Fernandez now coaches at the Jack Kramer Tennis Club in Rolling Hills Estates, California. She is married to Dale Parker and has three children, a son and two daughters.
