= Ada Bakker =

Dutch tennis player

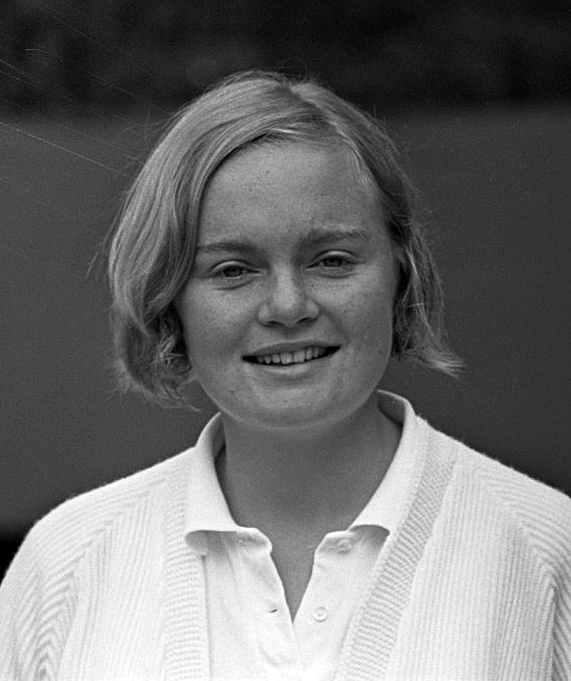
- Full name: Ada de Laive Bakker
- Country (sports): Netherlands
- Born: 8 April 1948 (age 77)

Singles
- Career titles: 0

Grand Slam singles results
- Australian Open: 1R (1968)
- Wimbledon: 3R (1968, 1970, 1971)
- US Open: 1R (1971)

Doubles
- Career titles: 0

Grand Slam doubles results
- Australian Open: QF (1968)
- Wimbledon: 3R (1968)

Grand Slam mixed doubles results
- Australian Open: 1R (1968)
- Wimbledon: 1R (1967, 1969)

Team competitions
- Fed Cup: SF (1969, 1974)
Medal record
Representing Netherlands
Tennis
Summer Universiade
Gold medal – first place	1967 Tokyo	Women's Doubles
Silver medal – second place	1967 Tokyo	Women's Singles
Gold medal – first place	1970 Turin	Women's Doubles

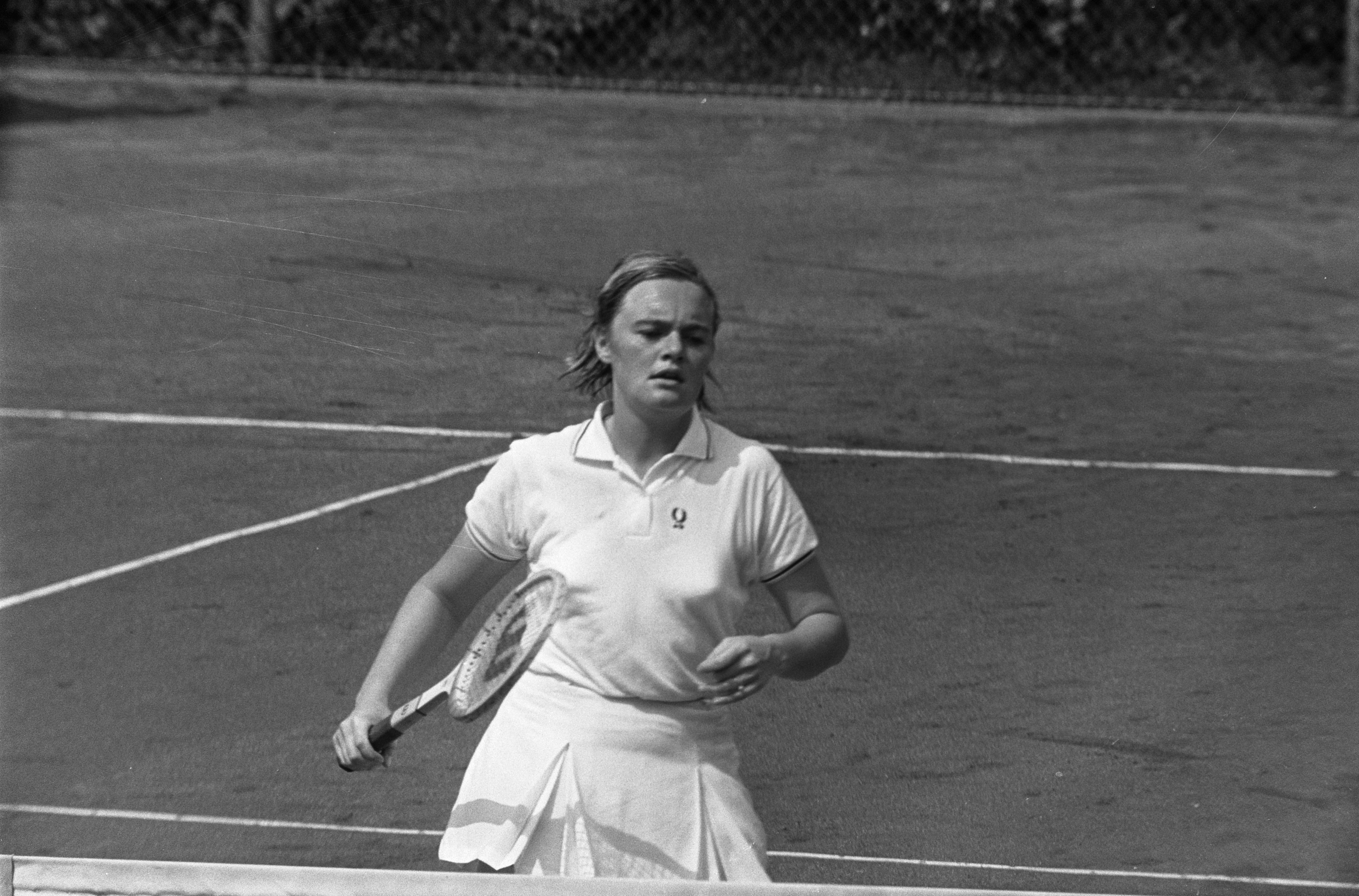
Ada Bakker

Ada Bakker (born 8 April 1948) is a former Dutch female tennis player who was active during the 1960s and 1970s. During her career Bakker played in three of the four Grand Slam tournaments, namely the Australian Open, Wimbledon and the US Open. Her most successful Grand Slam was Wimbledon where she reached the third round of the singles event in 1968, 1970, and 1971. Her best doubles result was reaching the quarterfinal of the 1968 Australian Open.

She competed in the 1967 Summer Universiade in Tokyo and won the women's doubles gold medal with Astrid Suurbeek. She also reached the final of the singles event which she lost to Nell Truman.

In 1969 and 1974 Bakker was a member of the Dutch Federation Cup team which reached the semifinals on both occasions. In total she played seven Federation Cup matches, all of them in doubles, of which she won five.

== Career finals ==
=== Doubles (2 runner-ups) ===
Result	W/L	Date	Tournament	Surface	Partner	Opponents	Score
Loss	0–1	Jan 1968	Auckland, New Zealand	Grass	(Netherlands) Astrid Suurbeek	(Australia) Kerry Melville (France) Gail Sherriff	0–6, 2–6
Loss	0–2	Apr 1969	Bournemouth, England	Hard	(Netherlands) Marijke Jansen	(Australia) Margaret Court (Australia) Judy Tegart	1–6, 4–6
