= Astrid Suurbeek =

Dutch tennis player

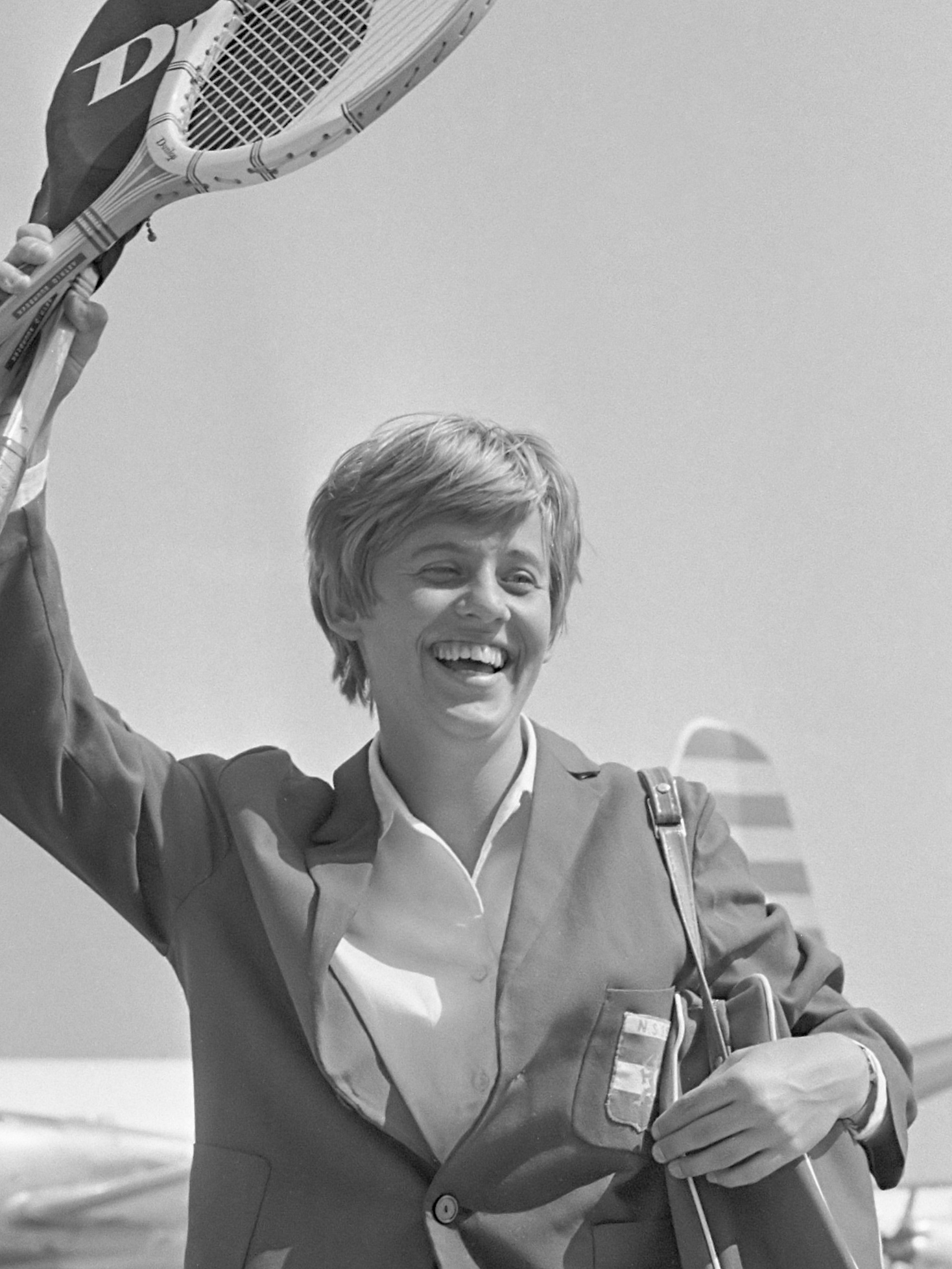
- Country (sports): Netherlands
- Born: 15 February 1947 (age 78)
- Height: 1.58 m (5 ft 2 in)

Singles
- Career record: no value
- Career titles: 0

Grand Slam singles results
- Australian Open: QF (1968)
- Wimbledon: 2R (1967, 1968, 1969)

Doubles
- Career record: no value
- Career titles: 0

Grand Slam doubles results
- Australian Open: QF (1968)
- Wimbledon: 3R (1968 )

Mixed doubles

Grand Slam mixed doubles results
- Australian Open: 2R (1968)

Team competitions
- Fed Cup: F (1968)
Medal record
Women's Tennis
Summer Universiade
Gold medal – first place	1967 Tokyo	Women's Doubles

Astrid Suurbeek (born 15 February 1947) is a former Dutch tennis player who was mainly active in the late 1960s.

== Career ==
Suurbeek won the singles Dutch championship at Scheveningen in 1967 and 1982 as well as the doubles and mixed doubles in 1968.

She competed in the 1967 Summer Universiade in Tokyo and won the women's doubles Gold medal with Ada Bakker.

Suurbeek played for the Dutch Federation Cup team that reached the 1968 final against Australia, played at the Stade Roland Garros in Paris. In the final, she played Australian multiple Grand Slam winner Margaret Court and lost in straight sets, 1–6, 3–6. Australia won the final 3–0. In the same year, she reached the women's singles quarterfinals of the Australian Open which she lost to eventual champion Billie Jean King.

Suurbeek played in the ladies' singles competition at Wimbledon in 1967, 1968 and 1969.

In 1980, she was voted Female Player of the Year by the USA Tennis Florida Adult Competitive Tennis Council. In 1983, she won the USTA National Indoor Women`s 35 Championships in St. Louis and was ranked first in the USTA women`s 35s.

She is currently head tennis professional at Gleneagles Country Club in Delray Beach, Florida.

== Career finals ==
=== Doubles (2 runner-ups) ===
Result	W/L	Date	Tournament	Surface	Partner	Opponents	Score
Loss	0–1	Jan 1968	Auckland, New Zealand	Grass	(Netherlands) Ada Bakker	(Australia) Kerry Melville (France) Gail Sherriff	0–6, 2–6
Loss	0–2	Jul 1968	Hilversum, Netherlands	Hard	(Australia) Judy Tegart	(South Africa) Annette Van Zyl (South Africa) Pat Walkden	2–6, 6–3, 3–6
