= 1995 Summer Universiade =

Multi-sport event in Fukuoka, Japan

XVIII Summer Universiade 第18回 夏季ユニバーシアード
- Slogan: スポーツはかるく国境を越える (Sports slightly go across border)
- Nations: 162
- Athletes: 3,949
- Events: 136 in 12 sports
- Opening: August 23, 1995
- Closing: September 3, 1995
- Opened by: Crown Prince Naruhito
- Main venue: Fukuoka Dome
- Website: universiade.fjct.fit.ac.jp (archived)

The 1995 Summer Universiade, also known as the XVIII Summer Universiade, took place in Fukuoka, Japan.

== Emblem ==
The symbol mark is a motif of "U", expressing passion and energy in the flickering flames of a burning torch. In the flames one sees both the profile of a youth and an "F", the first letter of Fukuoka.

== Mascot ==
The mascot character for the Fukuoka Games, "Kapapoo", is a motif of a unicorn, a mythical European creature. A horse-like animal with a single horn growing from its forehead, it is said to be invincible and unrivaled for its energy. The unicorn symbolizes courage, dignity, wisdom, nobility, justice and represents the sun and heroes.

== Venues ==
- Fukuoka Dome – ceremonies, baseball (final rounds)
- Hakatanomori Athletic Stadium – athletics, football finals
- Hakatanomori Football Stadium – football
- Marine Messe – volleyball (finals), gymnastics
- Fukuoka Prefectural Pool – aquatics
- Hakatonomori Tennis Club – tennis and water polo
- Sun Marine Stadium – baseball
- Fukuoka Kokusai Center – judo, basketball (finals)
- Accion Fukuoka – volleyball

== Sports ==
- Athletics ()
- Baseball ()
- Basketball ()
- Diving ()
- Fencing ()
- Football ()
- Gymnastics ()
- Judo ()
- Swimming ()
- Tennis ()
- Volleyball ()
- Water polo ()

== Participants ==
- Albania
- Algeria
- American Samoa
- Angola
- Antigua and Barbuda
- Argentina
- Armenia
- Australia
- Austria
- Azerbaijan
- Bangladesh
- Barbados
- Belarus
- Belgium
- Benin
- Bhutan
- Bolivia
- Botswana
- Brazil
- British Virgin Islands
- Bulgaria
- Burkina Faso
- Burundi
- Cambodia
- Cameroon
- Canada
- Cape Verde
- Central African Republic
- Chad
- Chile
- China
- Chinese Taipei
- Comoros
- Congo
- Costa Rica
- Côte d'Ivoire
- Croatia
- Cuba
- Cyprus
- Czech Republic
- Dominica
- Dominican Republic
- Ecuador
- El Salvador
- Equatorial Guinea
- Estonia
- Fiji
- Finland
- France
- Gambia
- Georgia
- Germany
- Ghana
- Great Britain
- Greece
- Grenada
- Guatemala
- Guyana
- Haiti
- Honduras
- Hong Kong
- Hungary
- India
- Indonesia
- Iran
- Iraq
- Ireland
- Israel
- Italy
- Jamaica
- Japan (host)
- Jordan
- Kazakhstan
- Kenya
- South Korea
- Kyrgyzstan
- Laos
- Latvia
- Lebanon
- Lesotho
- Liberia
- Libya
- Lithuania
- Luxembourg
- Macau
- Madagascar
- Malawi
- Malaysia
- Maldives
- Mali
- Malta
- Mauritania
- Mauritius
- Mexico
- Moldova
- Mongolia
- Morocco
- Mozambique
- Myanmar
- Namibia
- Nauru
- Nepal
- Netherlands
- Netherlands Antilles
- New Zealand
- Nicaragua
- Niger
- Nigeria
- Norway
- Pakistan
- Panama
- Papua New Guinea
- Paraguay
- Peru
- Philippines
- Poland
- Portugal
- Puerto Rico
- Romania
- Russia
- Saint Lucia
- Saint Vincent and the Grenadines
- San Marino
- São Tomé and Príncipe
- Senegal
- Seychelles
- Sierra Leone
- Singapore
- Slovakia
- Slovenia
- South Africa
- Spain
- Sri Lanka
- Sudan
- Suriname
- Swaziland
- Sweden
- Switzerland
- Syria
- Tajikistan
- Tanzania
- Thailand
- Togo
- Tonga
- Trinidad and Tobago
- Tunisia
- Turkey
- Turkmenistan
- Uganda
- Ukraine
- United Arab Emirates
- United States
- Uruguay
- Uzbekistan
- Vanuatu
- Vietnam
- United States Virgin Islands
- Western Samoa
- Yemen
- FR Yugoslavia
- Zambia
- Zimbabwe

== Medal table ==
* Host nation (Japan)

Rank	Nation	Gold	Silver	Bronze	Total
1	United States (USA)	24	27	18	69
2	Japan (JPN)*	24	16	24	64
3	Russia (RUS)	15	12	23	50
4	China (CHN)	13	10	16	39
5	South Korea (KOR)	10	7	10	27
6	Hungary (HUN)	8	4	2	14
7	Germany (GER)	6	6	8	20
8	Bulgaria (BUL)	5	4	2	11
9	Ukraine (UKR)	4	5	6	15
10	Romania (ROM)	4	5	2	11
11	Cuba (CUB)	4	3	3	10
12	Italy (ITA)	3	7	11	21
13	South Africa (RSA)	3	1	0	4
14	France (FRA)	2	6	7	15
15	Brazil (BRA)	2	5	2	9
16	Belarus (BLR)	2	3	3	8
17	Mexico (MEX)	2	1	2	5
18	FR Yugoslavia (YUG)	2	1	0	3
19	Australia (AUS)	1	2	3	6
20	Netherlands (NED)	1	2	2	5
21	Kenya (KEN)	1	2	0	3
22	Chinese Taipei (TPE)	1	1	2	4
22	Nigeria (NGR)	1	1	2	4
24	Czech Republic (CZE)	1	1	1	3
24	Slovakia (SVK)	1	1	1	3
26	Belgium (BEL)	1	0	1	2
27	Croatia (CRO)	1	0	0	1
27	Madagascar (MAD)	1	0	0	1
27	Saint Vincent and the Grenadines (VIN)	1	0	0	1
30	Great Britain (GBR)	0	3	7	10
31	Poland (POL)	0	3	4	7
32	Spain (ESP)	0	2	1	3
33	Kazakhstan (KAZ)	0	2	0	2
34	Canada (CAN)	0	1	2	3
35	Greece (GRE)	0	1	1	2
35	Morocco (MAR)	0	1	1	2
37	Armenia (ARM)	0	1	0	1
37	Austria (AUT)	0	1	0	1
37	Barbados (BAR)	0	1	0	1
40	Algeria (ALG)	0	0	1	1
40	Finland (FIN)	0	0	1	1
40	Portugal (POR)	0	0	1	1
40	Slovenia (SLO)	0	0	1	1
40	Switzerland (SUI)	0	0	1	1
Totals (44 entries)		144	149	172	465
