= 1993 Summer Universiade =

Multi-sport event in Buffalo, New York

XVII Summer Universiade
- Host city: Buffalo, New York, United States
- Nations: 118
- Athletes: 3,582
- Events: 135 in 12 sports
- Opening: July 8, 1993
- Closing: July 18, 1993
- Opened by: Primo Nebiolo
- Torch lighter: Ron Karnaugh
- Main venue: Rich Stadium

The 1993 Summer Universiade, also known as XVII Summer Universiade or World University Games Buffalo '93, took place in Buffalo, New York, as the main site. For the first time in history the event was hosted by two countries, as some events were held in neighbouring cities in Canada.

== Sports ==
- Athletics (43)
- Baseball (1)
- Basketball (2)
- Diving (8)
- Fencing (10)
- Football (2)
- Gymnastics (12)
- Rowing (15)
- Swimming (34)
- Tennis (5)
- Volleyball (2)
- Water polo (1)

== Venues ==
=== Buffalo, US ===
- Athletics and closing ceremonies – University at Buffalo Stadium
- Baseball – Pilot Field and Sal Maglie Stadium
- Diving, Volleyball and Basketball finals – Alumni Arena
- Football – Lewiston-Porter Central School District
- Gymnastics – Niagara Falls Convention and Civic Center
- Opening Ceremonies – Rich Stadium
- Swimming – Burt Flickinger Center
- Tennis – Ellicott Complex Tennis Center

=== Batavia ===
- Baseball - Dwyer Stadium

=== Tonawanda ===
- Water Polo – Tonawanda Aquatic and Fitness Center
- Football - Tonawanda High School Fields

=== Venues in Canada ===
  - Hamilton
- Basketball - Seymour-Hannah Sports and Entertainment Centre and Redeemer University College
- Football - McMaster University, Brian Timmis Stadium and Sherwood Forest Park
  - St. Catharines
- Rowing – Royal Canadian Henley Rowing Course

== Medal table ==
* Host nation (United States)

Rank	Nation	Gold	Silver	Bronze	Total
1	United States (USA)*	31	24	19	74
2	China (CHN)	17	6	5	28
3	Canada (CAN)	12	14	14	40
4	Ukraine (UKR)	11	6	9	26
5	Cuba (CUB)	8	4	4	16
6	Romania (ROU)	7	2	3	12
7	Germany (GER)	6	9	13	28
8	Japan (JPN)	5	13	12	30
9	Italy (ITA)	5	9	11	25
10	France (FRA)	5	8	11	24
11	Hungary (HUN)	4	4	6	14
12	Great Britain (GBR)	3	6	4	13
13	South Korea (KOR)	3	4	4	11
14	Poland (POL)	3	1	4	8
15	Belgium (BEL)	2	2	3	7
16	Belarus (BLR)	2	1	2	5
17	Australia (AUS)	2	0	2	4
18	Jamaica (JAM)	1	4	1	6
19	Nigeria (NGR)	1	3	2	6
20	Czech Republic (CZE)	1	3	0	4
21	Austria (AUT)	1	0	1	2
21	Finland (FIN)	1	0	1	2
21	Netherlands (NED)	1	0	1	2
21	Spain (ESP)	1	0	1	2
25	Ghana (GHA)	1	0	0	1
25	Kenya (KEN)	1	0	0	1
25	Morocco (MAR)	1	0	0	1
25	South Africa (SAF)	1	0	0	1
29	Mexico (MEX)	0	4	1	5
30	Russia (RUS)	0	3	4	7
31	Independent Participants	0	2	0	2
32	Armenia (ARM)	0	1	0	1
32	Brazil (BRA)	0	1	0	1
32	Estonia (EST)	0	1	0	1
32	Kazakhstan (KAZ)	0	1	0	1
32	Lithuania (LTU)	0	1	0	1
37	Chinese Taipei (TPE)	0	0	3	3
38	Bahamas (BAH)	0	0	1	1
38	Ethiopia (ETH)	0	0	1	1
38	Greece (GRE)	0	0	1	1
38	Ireland (IRL)	0	0	1	1
38	Madagascar (MAD)	0	0	1	1
38	Slovakia (SVK)	0	0	1	1
38	Switzerland (SUI)	0	0	1	1
Totals (44 entries)		137	137	148	422
