= Tennis at the 2002 Asian Games – Men's doubles =

Men's doubles at the 2002 Asian Games
- Venue: Geumjeong Tennis Stadium
- Dates: 7–11 October 2002
- Competitors: 50 from 18 nations

Medalists
gold medal	Leander Paes; Mahesh Bhupathi	India
silver medal	Chung Hee-seok; Lee Hyung-taik	South Korea
bronze medal	Kwon Oh-hee; Kim Dong-hyun	South Korea
bronze medal	Vishal Uppal; Mustafa Ghouse	India

Men's doubles
- Tennis at the 2002 Asian Games

Events
Singles	men	women
Doubles	men	women	mixed
Team	men	women
Asian Games

The men's doubles tennis event was part of the tennis programme and took place between October 7 and 11, at the Geumjeong Tennis Stadium.

== Schedule ==
All times are Korea Standard Time (UTC+09:00)

Date	Time	Event
Monday, 7 October 2002	13:00	1st round
Monday, 7 October 2002	16:00	2nd round
Tuesday, 8 October 2002	10:00	1st round
Tuesday, 8 October 2002	10:00	2nd round
Wednesday, 9 October 2002	11:00	Quarterfinals
Thursday, 10 October 2002	11:00	Semifinals
Friday, 11 October 2002	13:00	Final

== Results ==
=== Final ===
Final
1	Leander Paes (IND); Mahesh Bhupathi (IND)	6	6
	Chung Hee-seok (KOR); Lee Hyung-taik (KOR)	2	3

=== Top half ===
1st round
Rashid Malik (PAK); Aqeel Khan (PAK)	4	6	7
Renouk Wijemanne (SRI); Rajeev Rajapakse (SRI)	6	4	5
Takahiro Terachi (JPN); Michihisa Onoda (JPN)	6	6
Omar Al-Thagib (KSA); Fahad Al-Saad (KSA)	1	0
Attapol Rithiwattanapong (THA); Vittaya Samrej (THA)	6	7
Sultan Al-Alawi (QAT); Nasser Al-Khelaifi (QAT)	0	5
Ruslan Eshmuhamedov (KGZ); Eduard Koifman (KGZ)	1	2
Yu Hiu Tung (HKG); Wayne Wong (HKG)	6	6
Omar Al-Awadhi (UAE); Mahmoud Nader Al-Baloushi (UAE)	2	1
8	Kwon Oh-hee (KOR); Kim Dong-hyun (KOR)	6	6

2nd round
1	Leander Paes (IND); Mahesh Bhupathi (IND)	6	6
Rashid Malik (PAK); Aqeel Khan (PAK)	0	1
Takahiro Terachi (JPN); Michihisa Onoda (JPN)	6	4	4
5	Xu Ran (CHN); Zeng Shaoxuan (CHN)	4	6	6
4	Suwandi (INA); Peter Handoyo (INA)	6	6
Attapol Rithiwattanapong (THA); Vittaya Samrej (THA)	2	3
Yu Hiu Tung (HKG); Wayne Wong (HKG)	1	2
8	Kwon Oh-hee (KOR); Kim Dong-hyun (KOR)	6	6

Quarterfinals
1	Leander Paes (IND); Mahesh Bhupathi (IND)	6	6
5	Xu Ran (CHN); Zeng Shaoxuan (CHN)	4	3
4	Suwandi (INA); Peter Handoyo (INA)	2	7^{9}	6
8	Kwon Oh-hee (KOR); Kim Dong-hyun (KOR)	6	6^{7}	8

Semifinals
1	Leander Paes (IND); Mahesh Bhupathi (IND)	6	4	6
8	Kwon Oh-hee (KOR); Kim Dong-hyun (KOR)	3	6	4

=== Bottom half ===
1st round
Amrit Rupasinghe (SRI); Franklyn Emmanuel (SRI)	0	0
Chung Hee-seok (KOR); Lee Hyung-taik (KOR)	6	6
Paradorn Srichaphan (THA); Narathorn Srichaphan (THA)	6	6
Lei Hou In (MAC); Kuan Chu Shek (MAC)	0	0
Cheng Wei-jen (TPE); Chen Ti (TPE)	6	7^{7}
Sergei Makashin (TJK); Mansour Yakhyaev (TJK)	2	6^{1}
Brian Hung (HKG); John Hui (HKG)	6	6
Antonio Mendes (TMP); Matias de Souza (TMP)	0	0

2nd round
6	Yang Jingzhu (CHN); Zhu Benqiang (CHN)	1	6^{6}
Chung Hee-seok (KOR); Lee Hyung-taik (KOR)	6	7^{8}
Paradorn Srichaphan (THA); Narathorn Srichaphan (THA)	4	6	2
3	Goichi Motomura (JPN); Thomas Shimada (JPN)	6	3	6
7	Vishal Uppal (IND); Mustafa Ghouse (IND)	6	6
Cheng Wei-jen (TPE); Chen Ti (TPE)	1	4
Brian Hung (HKG); John Hui (HKG)	2	6	4
2	Vadim Kutsenko (UZB); Dmitri Tomashevich (UZB)	6	4	6

Quarterfinals
Chung Hee-seok (KOR); Lee Hyung-taik (KOR)	6	4	6
3	Goichi Motomura (JPN); Thomas Shimada (JPN)	3	6	2
7	Vishal Uppal (IND); Mustafa Ghouse (IND)	6^{5}	7^{7}	6
2	Vadim Kutsenko (UZB); Dmitri Tomashevich (UZB)	7^{7}	6^{1}	2

Semifinals
Chung Hee-seok (KOR); Lee Hyung-taik (KOR)	6	6
7	Vishal Uppal (IND); Mustafa Ghouse (IND)	4	4
