= Tennis at the 2002 Asian Games – Men's team =

Men's team at the 2002 Asian Games
- Venue: Geumjeong Tennis Stadium
- Dates: 2–7 October 2002
- Competitors: 56 from 19 nations

Medalists
gold medal	Japan; Michihisa Onoda, Thomas Shimada, Takao Suzuki, Takahiro Terachi
silver medal	South Korea; Chung Hee-seok, Kim Dong-hyun, Lee Hyung-taik, Yoon Yong-il
bronze medal	Uzbekistan; Vadim Kutsenko, Oleg Ogorodov, Dmitri Tomashevich
bronze medal	Indonesia; Peter Handoyo, Suwandi, Tintus Arianto Wibowo

Men's team
- Tennis at the 2002 Asian Games

Events
Singles	men	women
Doubles	men	women	mixed
Team	men	women
Asian Games

The men's team tennis event was part of the tennis programme and took place between October 2 and 7, at the Geumjeong Tennis Stadium.

== Schedule ==
All times are Korea Standard Time (UTC+09:00)

Date	Time	Event
Wednesday, 2 October 2002	10:00	1st round
Wednesday, 2 October 2002	10:00	2nd round
Thursday, 3 October 2002	10:00	2nd round
Friday, 4 October 2002	10:00	Quarterfinals
Saturday, 5 October 2002	10:00	Semifinals
Monday, 7 October 2002	10:00	Final

== Results ==
=== Bracket ===
==== Final ====
Final
4	Japan	2
3	South Korea	0

==== Top half ====
1st round
Tajikistan	1
Pakistan	2

2nd round
1	Uzbekistan	3
Mongolia	0
Timor-Leste	0
5	India	3
4	Japan	3
Macau	0
Pakistan	1
8	Thailand	2

Quarterfinals
1	Uzbekistan	3
5	India	0
4	Japan	3
8	Thailand	0

Semifinals
1	Uzbekistan	1
4	Japan	2

==== Bottom half ====
1st round
Kyrgyzstan	1
Sri Lanka	2
Saudi Arabia	3
United Arab Emirates	0

2nd round
7	China	3
Sri Lanka	0
Qatar	0
3	South Korea	3
6	Indonesia	3
Saudi Arabia	0
Hong Kong	1
2	Chinese Taipei	2

Quarterfinals
7	China	0
3	South Korea	3
6	Indonesia	2
2	Chinese Taipei	1

Semifinals
3	South Korea	3
6	Indonesia	0

=== 1st round ===
2 October	Tajikistan	1–2	Pakistan

Mansour Yakhyaev	2–0	Rashid Malik	6–2, 6–1
Sergei Makashin	0–2	Aqeel Khan	2–6, 3–6
Sergei Makashin / Mansour Yakhyaev	0–2	Aqeel Khan / Rashid Malik	5–7, 2–6

2 October	Kyrgyzstan	1–2	Sri Lanka

Ruslan Eshmuhamedov	2–1	Rajeev Rajapakse	4–6, 6–4, 6–0
Eduard Koifman	0–2	Renouk Wijemanne	1–6, 2–6
Ruslan Eshmuhamedov / Eduard Koifman	0–2	Renouk Wijemanne / Rajeev Rajapakse	0–6, 5–7

2 October	Saudi Arabia	3–0	United Arab Emirates

Fahad Al-Saad	2–0	Omar Al-Awadhi	6–3, 6–4
Omar Al-Thagib	2–0	Mahmoud Nader Al-Baloushi	6–2, 6–3
Omar Al-Thagib / Fahad Al-Saad	2–0	Omar Al-Awadhi / Mahmoud Nader Al-Baloushi	6–4, 6–4

=== 2nd round ===
3 October	Uzbekistan	3–0	Mongolia

Vadim Kutsenko	2–0	Sükhbaataryn Sükhjargal	6–0, 6–0
Oleg Ogorodov	2–0	Baataryn Oyuunbold	6–0, 6–1
Dmitri Tomashevich / Vadim Kutsenko	2–0	Sükhbaataryn Sükhjargal / Baataryn Oyuunbold	6–0, 6–0

2 October	Timor-Leste	0–3	India

Matias de Souza	0–2	Leander Paes	0–6, 0–6
Antonio Mendes	0–2	Rohan Bopanna	0–6, 0–6
Antonio Mendes / Matias de Souza	0–2	Rohan Bopanna / Sunil Kumar Sipaeya	0–6, 1–6

3 October	Japan	3–0	Macau

Michihisa Onoda	2–0	Kuan Chu Shek	6–2, 6–0
Takahiro Terachi	2–0	Lei Hou In	6–0, 6–0
Takahiro Terachi / Michihisa Onoda	2–0	Lei Hou In / Kuan Chu Shek	6–0, 6–0

3 October	Pakistan	1–2	Thailand

Rashid Malik	0–2	Narathorn Srichaphan	3–6, 2–6
Aqeel Khan	2–1	Vittaya Samrej	6–3, 3–6, 6–1
Aqeel Khan / Rashid Malik	0–2	Narathorn Srichaphan / Vittaya Samrej	3–6, 2–6

3 October	China	3–0	Sri Lanka

Wang Yu	2–0	Rajeev Rajapakse	6–0, 6–3
Zhu Benqiang	2–0	Renouk Wijemanne	6–0, 6–4
Xu Ran / Zeng Shaoxuan	2–0	Renouk Wijemanne / Rajeev Rajapakse	6–0, 6–4

2 October	Qatar	0–3	South Korea

Sultan Al-Alawi	0–2	Chung Hee-seok	4–6, 1–6
Nasser Al-Khelaifi	0–2	Kim Dong-hyun	0–6, 1–6
Sultan Al-Alawi / Nasser Al-Khelaifi	0–2	Chung Hee-seok / Kim Dong-hyun	2–6, 2–6

3 October	Indonesia	3–0	Saudi Arabia

Peter Handoyo	2–0	Omar Al-Thagib	6–1, 6–2
Suwandi	2–0	Fahad Al-Saad	6–1, 6–1
Suwandi / Peter Handoyo	2–0	Omar Al-Thagib / Fahad Al-Saad	7–5, 6–1

2 October	Hong Kong	1–2	Chinese Taipei

Wayne Wong	2–1	Jimmy Wang	6–7, 6–4, 6–1
Yu Hiu Tung	0–2	Lu Yen-hsun	2–6, 2–6
John Hui / Wayne Wong	0–2	Cheng Wei-jen / Lu Yen-hsun	4–6, 4–6

=== Quarterfinals ===
4 October	Uzbekistan	3–0	India

Vadim Kutsenko	2–0	Leander Paes	6–0, 6–4
Oleg Ogorodov	2–1	Rohan Bopanna	7–5, 2–6, 6–3
Dmitri Tomashevich / Vadim Kutsenko	2–1	Mahesh Bhupathi / Sunil Kumar Sipaeya	6–1, 4–6, 7–6

4 October	Japan	3–0	Thailand

Michihisa Onoda	2–0	Attapol Rithiwattanapong	6–2, 6–3
Takahiro Terachi	2–0	Danai Udomchoke	7–6, 6–2
Takahiro Terachi / Michihisa Onoda	2–0	Narathorn Srichaphan / Vittaya Samrej	7–5, 6–1

4 October	China	1–2	South Korea

Wang Yu	0–2	Yoon Yong-il	3–6, 5–7
Zhu Benqiang	0–2	Lee Hyung-taik	4–6, 1–6
Xu Ran / Zeng Shaoxuan	2–1	Chung Hee-seok / Kim Dong-hyun	6–2, 3–6, 7–6

4 October	Indonesia	2–1	Chinese Taipei

Peter Handoyo	2–1	Jimmy Wang	3–6, 7–5, 6–3
Suwandi	1–2	Lu Yen-hsun	7–5, 2–6, 5–7
Suwandi / Peter Handoyo	2–0	Jimmy Wang / Lu Yen-hsun	6–2, 7–6

=== Semifinals ===
5 October	Uzbekistan	1–2	Japan

Vadim Kutsenko	1–2	Michihisa Onoda	6–7, 6–4, 5–7
Oleg Ogorodov	1–2	Takahiro Terachi	6–1, 3–6, 0–6
Oleg Ogorodov / Vadim Kutsenko	2–0	Takahiro Terachi / Michihisa Onoda	2–3, Retired

5 October	South Korea	3–0	Indonesia

Yoon Yong-il	2–0	Peter Handoyo	6–3, 6–0
Lee Hyung-taik	2–0	Suwandi	6–1, 6–4
Chung Hee-seok / Lee Hyung-taik	2–0	Suwandi / Peter Handoyo	1–0, Retired

=== Final ===
7 October	Japan	2–0	South Korea

Michihisa Onoda	2–0	Yoon Yong-il	6–1, 6–3
Takahiro Terachi	2–0	Lee Hyung-taik	6–4, 6–2

== Non-participating athletes ==
- Brian Hung (HKG)
- Tintus Arianto Wibowo (INA)
- Thomas Shimada (JPN)
- Takao Suzuki (JPN)
- Franklyn Emmanuel (SRI)
- Amrit Rupasinghe (SRI)
- Chen Ti (TPE)
