= Tennis at the 2002 Asian Games – Mixed doubles =

Mixed doubles at the 2002 Asian Games
- Venue: Geumjeong Tennis Stadium
- Dates: 7–11 October 2002
- Competitors: 36 from 9 nations

Medalists
gold medal	Lu Yen-hsun; Janet Lee	Chinese Taipei
silver medal	Mahesh Bhupathi; Manisha Malhotra	India
bronze medal	Leander Paes; Sania Mirza	India
bronze medal	Oleg Ogorodov; Iroda Tulyaganova	Uzbekistan

Mixed doubles
- Tennis at the 2002 Asian Games

Events
Singles	men	women
Doubles	men	women	mixed
Team	men	women
Asian Games

The mixed doubles tennis event was part of the tennis programme and took place between October 7 and 11, at the Geumjeong Tennis Stadium.

== Schedule ==
All times are Korea Standard Time (UTC+09:00)

Date	Time	Event
Monday, 7 October 2002	10:00	1st round
Monday, 7 October 2002	16:00	2nd round
Tuesday, 8 October 2002	10:00	2nd round
Wednesday, 9 October 2002	14:00	Quarterfinals
Thursday, 10 October 2002	16:30	Semifinals
Friday, 11 October 2002	16:00	Final

== Results ==
=== Final ===
Final
4	Lu Yen-hsun (TPE); Janet Lee (TPE)	4	6	9
2	Mahesh Bhupathi (IND); Manisha Malhotra (IND)	6	3	7

=== Top half ===
1st round
Baataryn Oyuunbold (MGL); Khishigtogtokhyn Khandsüren (MGL)	1	0
Vittaya Samrej (THA); Tamarine Tanasugarn (THA)	6	6

2nd round
1	Thomas Shimada (JPN); Shinobu Asagoe (JPN)	3	3
Leander Paes (IND); Sania Mirza (IND)	6	6
Vittaya Samrej (THA); Tamarine Tanasugarn (THA)	6	6
7	Dmitri Tomashevich (UZB); Ivanna Isroilova (UZB)	1	1
4	Lu Yen-hsun (TPE); Janet Lee (TPE)	6	6
Kim Dong-hyun (KOR); Cho Yoon-jeong (KOR)	3	4
Suwandi (INA); Liza Andriyani (INA)	2	6	4
5	Xu Ran (CHN); Sun Tiantian (CHN)	6	4	6

Quarterfinals
Leander Paes (IND); Sania Mirza (IND)	2	6	6
Vittaya Samrej (THA); Tamarine Tanasugarn (THA)	6	2	1
4	Lu Yen-hsun (TPE); Janet Lee (TPE)	6	5	6
5	Xu Ran (CHN); Sun Tiantian (CHN)	3	7	1

Semifinals
Leander Paes (IND); Sania Mirza (IND)	6^{4}	5
4	Lu Yen-hsun (TPE); Janet Lee (TPE)	7^{7}	7

=== Bottom half ===
1st round
Sükhbaataryn Sükhjargal (MGL); Enkhjargalyn Khaliun (MGL)	0	1
Takahiro Terachi (JPN); Akiko Morigami (JPN)	6	6

2nd round
8	Yang Jingzhu (CHN); Li Ting (CHN)	6	6^{5}	6
Takahiro Terachi (JPN); Akiko Morigami (JPN)	3	7^{7}	1
Chung Hee-seok (KOR); Choi Jin-young (KOR)	4	6	8
3	Oleg Ogorodov (UZB); Iroda Tulyaganova (UZB)	6	4	10
6	Jimmy Wang (TPE); Chuang Chia-jung (TPE)	7	4	7
Peter Handoyo (INA); Wukirasih Sawondari (INA)	5	6	5
Attapol Rithiwattanapong (THA); Prariyawan Ratanakrong (THA)	4	2
2	Mahesh Bhupathi (IND); Manisha Malhotra (IND)	6	6

Quarterfinals
8	Yang Jingzhu (CHN); Li Ting (CHN)	2	6	3
3	Oleg Ogorodov (UZB); Iroda Tulyaganova (UZB)	6	4	6
6	Jimmy Wang (TPE); Chuang Chia-jung (TPE)	5	5
2	Mahesh Bhupathi (IND); Manisha Malhotra (IND)	7	7

Semifinals
3	Oleg Ogorodov (UZB); Iroda Tulyaganova (UZB)	4	6	3
2	Mahesh Bhupathi (IND); Manisha Malhotra (IND)	6	2	6
