= 2003 Davis Cup Asia/Oceania Zone Group I =

International men's tennis tournament

The Asia/Oceania Zone was one of the three zones of the regional Davis Cup competition in 2003.

In the Asia/Oceania Zone there were four different tiers, called groups, in which teams competed against each other to advance to the upper tier. Winners in Group I advanced to the World Group qualifying round, along with losing teams from the World Group first round. Teams who lost their respective ties competed in the relegation play-offs, with winning teams remaining in Group I, whereas teams who lost their play-offs were relegated to the Asia/Oceania Zone Group II in 2004.

== Participating nations ==
- India
- Indonesia
- Japan
- New Zealand
- Pakistan
- South Korea
- Thailand
- Uzbekistan

=== Draw ===
Second Round Play-offs
Lahore, Pakistan (grass)
Pakistan	3
South Korea	2

First Round Play-offs
Toyota, Japan (indoor carpet)
Japan	5
Pakistan	0
Surabaya, Indonesia (hard)
Indonesia	3
South Korea	2

First Round
New Delhi, India (grass)
1	India	4
Japan	1
Hamilton, New Zealand (hard)
4	New Zealand	5
Pakistan	0
Tashkent, Uzbekistan (indoor hard)
Indonesia	2
3	Uzbekistan	3
Bangkok, Thailand (indoor carpet)
South Korea	1
2	Thailand	4

Second Round
Kolkata, India (grass)
1	India	4
4	New Zealand	1
Tashkent, Uzbekistan (indoor hard)
3	Uzbekistan	1
2	Thailand	4

- South Korea relegated to Group II in 2004.
- India and Thailand advance to World Group Play-off.

== First round ==
=== India vs. Japan ===
India
4
R.K. Khanna Tennis Stadium, New Delhi, India
7–9 February 2003
Grass

Japan
1

			1	2	3	4	5
1	(India) (Japan)	Rohan Bopanna; Gouichi Motomura	4; 6	7^{7} 6^{4}	6^{4} 7^{7}	3; 6
2	(India) (Japan)	Leander Paes; Takao Suzuki	6; 3	7^{7} 6^{3}	6; 4
3	(India) (Japan)	Mahesh Bhupathi / Leander Paes; Jun Kato / Thomas Shimada	6; 2	6; 2	6; 3
4	(India) (Japan)	Rohan Bopanna; Jun Kato	7^{7} 6^{5}	6; 4	6; 4
5	(India) (Japan)	Leander Paes; Gouichi Motomura	1; 6	6; 3	6; 4

=== New Zealand vs. Pakistan ===
New Zealand
5
Waikato Tennis Centre, Hamilton, New Zealand
7–9 February 2003
Hard

Pakistan
0

			1	2	3	4	5
1	(New Zealand) (Pakistan)	Mark Nielsen; Aqeel Khan	6; 0	6; 1	6; 2
2	(New Zealand) (Pakistan)	Alistair Hunt; Aisam Qureshi	6; 4	1; 6	7; 5	6; 2
3	(New Zealand) (Pakistan)	Alistair Hunt / Mark Nielsen; Aqeel Khan / Aisam Qureshi	6; 3	6; 1	6^{4} 7^{7}	7; 5
4	(New Zealand) (Pakistan)	James Shortall; Asim Shafik	6; 2	6; 2
5	(New Zealand) (Pakistan)	Robert Cheyne; Nomi Qamar	6; 2	6; 0

=== Uzbekistan vs. Indonesia ===
Uzbekistan
3
Unus Abad Tennis Club, Tashkent, Uzbekistan
7–9 February 2003
Hard (indoors)

Indonesia
2

			1	2	3	4	5
1	(Uzbekistan) (Indonesia)	Oleg Ogorodov; Peter Handoyo	7^{8} 6^{6}	5; 7	6; 4	5; 7	6; 3
2	(Uzbekistan) (Indonesia)	Vadim Kutsenko; Febi Widhiyanto	6; 2	6^{5} 7^{7}	2; 6	6; 0	2; 6
3	(Uzbekistan) (Indonesia)	Vadim Kutsenko / Oleg Ogorodov; Peter Handoyo / Suwandi Suwandi	6^{2} 7^{7}	3; 6	7; 5	4; 6
4	(Uzbekistan) (Indonesia)	Vadim Kutsenko; Peter Handoyo	4; 6	6; 4	6; 1	6; 0
5	(Uzbekistan) (Indonesia)	Oleg Ogorodov; Febi Widhiyanto	1; 6	7; 5	7; 5	6; 0

=== Thailand vs. South Korea ===
Thailand
4
Indoor Stadium Huamark, Bangkok, Thailand
7–9 February 2003
Carpet (indoors)

South Korea
1

			1	2	3	4	5
1	(Thailand) (South Korea)	Paradorn Srichaphan; Chung Hee-seok	6; 2	6; 2	6; 3
2	(Thailand) (South Korea)	Danai Udomchoke; Kim Dong-hyun	6; 3	5; 7	6; 1	6; 2
3	(Thailand) (South Korea)	Attapol Rithiwattanapong / Narathorn Srichaphan; Chung Hee-seok / Chung Hee-sung	1; 6	4; 6	1; 6
4	(Thailand) (South Korea)	Paradorn Srichaphan; Kim Dong-hyun	6; 3	6; 4	7^{7} 6^{3}
5	(Thailand) (South Korea)	Danai Udomchoke; Chung Hee-seok	6; 1	6; 3

== Second round ==
=== India vs. New Zealand ===
India
4
South Club, Kolkata, India
4–6 April 2003
Grass

New Zealand
1

			1	2	3	4	5
1	(India) (New Zealand)	Leander Paes; Mark Nielsen	6; 1	7^{7} 6^{1}	6; 2
2	(India) (New Zealand)	Rohan Bopanna; Alistair Hunt	6; 4	6; 4	3; 6	2; 6	7; 9
3	(India) (New Zealand)	Mahesh Bhupathi / Leander Paes; Alistair Hunt / Mark Nielsen	6; 3	6; 2	6; 2
4	(India) (New Zealand)	Rohan Bopanna; James Shortall	6; 3	6; 2	6; 4
5	(India) (New Zealand)	Leander Paes; Robert Cheyne	6; 1	6; 0

=== Uzbekistan vs. Thailand ===
Uzbekistan
1
UNUS ABAD Tennis Club, Tashkent, Uzbekistan
4–6 April 2003
Hard (indoors)

Thailand
4

			1	2	3	4	5
1	(Uzbekistan) (Thailand)	Vadim Kutsenko; Danai Udomchoke	2; 6	2; 6	3; 6
2	(Uzbekistan) (Thailand)	Oleg Ogorodov; Paradorn Srichaphan	3; 6	4; 6	4; 6
3	(Uzbekistan) (Thailand)	Vadim Kutsenko / Oleg Ogorodov; Attapol Rithiwattanapong / Narathorn Srichaphan	4; 1					retired
4	(Uzbekistan) (Thailand)	Vadim Kutsenko; Paradorn Srichaphan	3; 6	3; 6	3; 6
5	(Uzbekistan) (Thailand)	Murad Inoyatov; Danai Udomchoke	4; 6	3; 6

== First round relegation play-offs ==
=== Japan vs. Pakistan ===
Japan
5
Toyota City Gymnasium, Toyota, Japan
4–6 April 2003
Carpet (indoors)

Pakistan
0

			1	2	3	4	5
1	(Japan) (Pakistan)	Gouichi Motomura; Shahzad Khan	6; 2	6; 3	6; 1
2	(Japan) (Pakistan)	Takao Suzuki; Aqeel Khan	6; 1	6; 1	6; 4
3	(Japan) (Pakistan)	Thomas Shimada / Takahiro Terachi; Aqeel Khan / Shahzad Khan	6; 1	6; 1	6; 0
4	(Japan) (Pakistan)	Gouichi Motomura; Inam Gul	6; 0	6; 1
5	(Japan) (Pakistan)	Takao Suzuki; Shahzad Khan	6; 2	6; 2

=== Indonesia vs. South Korea ===
Indonesia
3
Embong Sawo, Surabaya, Indonesia
4–6 April 2003
Hard

South Korea
2

			1	2	3	4	5
1	(Indonesia) (South Korea)	Febi Widhiyanto; Kim Dong-hyun	6; 1	6; 3	6; 0
2	(Indonesia) (South Korea)	Peter Handoyo; Chung Hee-seok	5; 7	2; 6	1; 2			retired
3	(Indonesia) (South Korea)	Peter Handoyo / Suwandi Suwandi; Chung Hee-seok / Chung Hee-sung	7; 5	6; 4	6; 4
4	(Indonesia) (South Korea)	Suwandi Suwandi; Im Kyu-tae	6; 4	6; 4	6; 1
5	(Indonesia) (South Korea)	Prima Simpatiaji; Chung Hee-seok	5; 7	6^{2} 7^{7}

== Second round relegation play-offs ==
=== Pakistan vs. South Korea ===
Pakistan
3
Defence Club, Lahore, Pakistan
19–21 September 2003
Grass

South Korea
2

			1	2	3	4	5
1	(Pakistan) (South Korea)	Aisam Qureshi; Im Kyu-tae	6; 1	6; 2	6; 4
2	(Pakistan) (South Korea)	Aqeel Khan; Kim Young-Jun	6^{17} 7^{19}	6; 4	3; 6	6^{8} 7^{10}
3	(Pakistan) (South Korea)	Aqeel Khan / Aisam Qureshi; Chung Hee-seok / Chung Hee-sung	6; 4	6; 4	6; 4
4	(Pakistan) (South Korea)	Aisam Qureshi; Kim Young-Jun	7^{7} 6^{4}	6^{5} 7^{7}	7^{7} 6^{2}	6^{5} 7^{7}	4; 6
5	(Pakistan) (South Korea)	Aqeel Khan; Im Kyu-tae	6; 3	6; 3	6; 4
