= Tennis at the 2002 Asian Games =

Tennis tournament in Busan, South Korea

- Venue: Geumjeong Tennis Stadium
- Dates: 2–12 October 2002
- Competitors: 102 from 19 nations

Tennis were contested at the 2002 Asian Games in Busan, South Korea from October 2 to October 12, 2002. Tennis had team, doubles, and singles events for men and women, as well as a mixed doubles competition. The tennis competition was held at the Geumjeong Tennis Stadium.

The host nation South Korea finished first in the medal table with seven medals.

== Schedule ==
P	Preliminary rounds	¼	Quarterfinals	½	Semifinals	F	Final

Event↓/Date →	2nd Wed	3rd Thu	4th Fri		5th Sat	6th Sun	7th Mon	8th Tue	9th Wed	10th Thu	11th Fri	12th Sat
Men's singles							P	P	P	¼	½	F
Men's doubles							P	P	¼	½	F	
Men's team	P	P	¼		½		F					
Women's singles							P	P	¼	½	F	
Women's doubles									P	¼	½	F
Women's team	P	¼	¼	½	F							
Mixed doubles							P	P	¼	½	F	

== Medalists ==
Event	Gold	Silver	Bronze
Men's singles	Paradorn Srichaphan; Thailand	Lee Hyung-taik; South Korea	Oleg Ogorodov; Uzbekistan
Men's singles	Paradorn Srichaphan; Thailand	Lee Hyung-taik; South Korea	Takao Suzuki; Japan
Men's doubles	India; Leander Paes; Mahesh Bhupathi	South Korea; Chung Hee-seok; Lee Hyung-taik	South Korea; Kwon Oh-hee; Kim Dong-hyun
Men's doubles	India; Leander Paes; Mahesh Bhupathi	South Korea; Chung Hee-seok; Lee Hyung-taik	India; Vishal Uppal; Mustafa Ghouse
Men's team	Japan; Michihisa Onoda; Thomas Shimada; Takao Suzuki; Takahiro Terachi	South Korea; Chung Hee-seok; Kim Dong-hyun; Lee Hyung-taik; Yoon Yong-il	Uzbekistan; Vadim Kutsenko; Oleg Ogorodov; Dmitri Tomashevich
Men's team	Japan; Michihisa Onoda; Thomas Shimada; Takao Suzuki; Takahiro Terachi	South Korea; Chung Hee-seok; Kim Dong-hyun; Lee Hyung-taik; Yoon Yong-il	Indonesia; Peter Handoyo; Suwandi; Tintus Arianto Wibowo
Women's singles	Iroda Tulyaganova; Uzbekistan	Tamarine Tanasugarn; Thailand	Shinobu Asagoe; Japan
Women's singles	Iroda Tulyaganova; Uzbekistan	Tamarine Tanasugarn; Thailand	Cho Yoon-jeong; South Korea
Women's doubles	South Korea; Kim Mi-ok; Choi Young-ja	Indonesia; Wynne Prakusya; Angelique Widjaja	Japan; Saori Obata; Akiko Morigami
Women's doubles	South Korea; Kim Mi-ok; Choi Young-ja	Indonesia; Wynne Prakusya; Angelique Widjaja	Japan; Yuka Yoshida; Miho Saeki
Women's team	Indonesia; Liza Andriyani; Wynne Prakusya; Wukirasih Sawondari; Angelique Widjaja	Japan; Shinobu Asagoe; Saori Obata; Miho Saeki; Yuka Yoshida	South Korea; Cho Yoon-jeong; Choi Young-ja; Chung Yang-jin; Jeon Mi-ra
Women's team	Indonesia; Liza Andriyani; Wynne Prakusya; Wukirasih Sawondari; Angelique Widjaja	Japan; Shinobu Asagoe; Saori Obata; Miho Saeki; Yuka Yoshida	Chinese Taipei; Chan Chin-wei; Chuang Chia-jung; Hsieh Su-wei; Janet Lee
Mixed doubles	Chinese Taipei; Lu Yen-hsun; Janet Lee	India; Mahesh Bhupathi; Manisha Malhotra	India; Leander Paes; Sania Mirza
Mixed doubles	Chinese Taipei; Lu Yen-hsun; Janet Lee	India; Mahesh Bhupathi; Manisha Malhotra	Uzbekistan; Oleg Ogorodov; Iroda Tulyaganova

== Medal table ==
Rank	Nation	Gold	Silver	Bronze	Total
1	South Korea (KOR)	1	3	3	7
2	Japan (JPN)	1	1	4	6
3	India (IND)	1	1	2	4
4	Indonesia (INA)	1	1	1	3
5	Thailand (THA)	1	1	0	2
6	Uzbekistan (UZB)	1	0	3	4
7	Chinese Taipei (TPE)	1	0	1	2
Totals (7 entries)		7	7	14	28

== Participating nations ==
A total of 102 athletes from 19 nations competed in tennis at the 2002 Asian Games:

- China (10)
- Chinese Taipei (9)
- Hong Kong (4)
- India (11)
- Indonesia (7)
- Japan (10)
- Kyrgyzstan (4)
- Macau (2)
- Mongolia (5)
- Pakistan (2)
- Qatar (2)
- Saudi Arabia (2)
- South Korea (11)
- Sri Lanka (4)
- Tajikistan (2)
- Thailand (8)
- Timor-Leste (2)
- United Arab Emirates (2)
- Uzbekistan (5)
