= Indonesia at the 2002 Asian Games =

- IOC code: INA
- NOC: Indonesian Olympic Committee
- Website: www.nocindonesia.or.id (in English)

in Busan
- Medals Ranked 14th: Gold 4 Silver 7 Bronze 12 Total 23

Asian Games appearances (overview)
- 1951; 1954; 1958; 1962; 1966; 1970; 1974; 1978; 1982; 1986; 1990; 1994; 1998; 2002; 2006; 2010; 2014; 2018; 2022; 2026

Indonesia participated in the 2002 Asian Games held in the city of Busan, South Korea from 29 September 2002 to 14 October 2002. Indonesia ranked 14th with 4 gold medals in this edition of the Asiad.

== Competitors ==
Sport	Men	Women	Total
Badminton	10	2	12
Beach volleyball	4	2	6
Karate	4	1	5
Sailing	2	0	2
Tennis	3	4	7
Total	94	35	129

== Medal summary ==
=== Medal table ===
Sport	Gold	Silver	Bronze	Total
Badminton	1	1	3	5
Tennis	1	1	1	3
Karate	1	0	1	2
Sailing	1	0	0	1
Cycling	0	2	2	4
Weightlifting	0	1	2	3
Beach volleyball	0	1	0	1
Body Building	0	1	0	1
Taekwondo	0	0	2	1
Rowing	0	0	1	1
Total	4	7	12	23

=== Medalists ===
Medal	Name	Sport	Event
Gold	Taufik Hidayat	Badminton	Men's singles
Gold	Angelique Widjaja; Liza Andriyani; Wukirasih Sawondari; Wynne Prakusya	Tennis	Women's team
Gold	Hasan Basri	Karate	Men's kumite −65 kg
Gold	Oka Sulaksana	Sailing	Men's Mistral Heavyweight
Silver	Men's Team: Taufik Hidayat; Hendrawan; Marleve Mainaky; Rony Agustinus; Nova Widianto; Candra Wijaya; Bambang Suprianto; Sigit Budiarto; Tri Kusharjanto; Halim Haryanto	Badminton	Men's team
Silver	Agus Salim; Koko Prasetyo Darkuncoro	Beach volleyball	Men
Silver	Wimpi Wungow	Bodybuilding	Men's +90 kg
Silver	Uyun Muzizah	Cycling – Road	Women's road race
Silver	Uyun Muzizah	Cycling – Track	Women's individual pursuit
Silver	Angelique Widjaja; Wynne Prakusya	Tennis	Women's doubles
Silver	Erwin Abdullah	Weightlifting	Men's −69 kg
Bronze	Hendrawan	Badminton	Men's singles
Bronze	Halim Haryanto; Tri Kusharjanto	Badminton	Men's doubles
Bronze	Nova Widianto; Vita Marissa	Badminton	Mixed doubles
Bronze	Risa Suseanty	Cycling – Mountain Bike	Women's downhill
Bronze	Santia Tri Kusuma	Cycling – Track	Women's points race
Bronze	Bambang Maulidin	Karate	Men's kumite −55 kg
Bronze	Rodiaman; Rahmat; Agus Budi Aji; Aldino Maryandi	Rowing	Men's Lightweight Coxless Four
Bronze	Suwandi; Peter Handoyo; Tintus Wibowo	Tennis	Men's team
Bronze	Raema Lisa Rumbewas	Weightlifting	Women's −48 kg
Bronze	Tanti Pratiwi	Weightlifting	Women's −58 kg
Bronze	Muhammad Dalam Imam	Taekwondo	Men's −54 kg
Bronze	Juana Wangsa Putri	Taekwondo	Women's −51 kg

== Badminton ==
Men

Athlete	Event	Round of 32	Round of 16	Quarterfinals	Semifinals	Final	
Athlete	Event	Opposition Score	Opposition Score	Opposition Score	Opposition Score	Opposition Score	Rank
Taufik Hidayat	Singles	Bye	Masuda (JPN); W 15-3, 15-2	Hashim (MAS); W 15-11, 15-5	(2) Shon (KOR); W 15-10, 15-7	Lee (KOR); W 15-7, 15-9	1st place, gold medalist(s)
Hendrawan	Singles	Gupta (IND); W 15-5, 15-5	Susilo (SIN); W 15-8, 15-5	(1) Xia (CHN); W 12-15, 15-10, 15-4	Lee (KOR); L 3-15, 4-15	Did not advance	3rd place, bronze medalist(s)
Candra Wijaya; Sigit Budiarto	Doubles		Fujimoto / Sasaki (JPN); W 15-10, 15-6	(4) Chan / Chew (MAS); L 15-8, 14-17, 5-15	did not advance		
Halim Haryanto; Tri Kusharjanto	Doubles		Choong / Chang (MAS); W 15-10, 15-9	(2) Kim / Ha (KOR); W 15-7, 8-15, 15-8	(3) Teerawiwatana / Panvisvas (THA); L 15-17, 8-15	Did not advance	3rd place, bronze medalist(s)
Rony Agustinus; Sigit Budiarto; Halim Haryanto; Hendrawan; Taufik Hidayat; Tri Kusharjanto; Marleve Mainaky; Bambang Suprianto; Nova Widianto; Candra Wijaya	Team			Thailand (THA); W 3-1	China (CHN); W 3-1	South Korea (KOR); L 1-3	2nd place, silver medalist(s)

Women

Athlete	Event	Round of 32	Round of 16	Quarterfinals	Semifinals	Final	
Athlete	Event	Opposition Score	Opposition Score	Opposition Score	Opposition Score	Opposition Score	Rank
(4) Emma Ermawati; Vita Marissa	Doubles		Siu / Ling (HKG); W 11-2, 11-1	Lee / Hwang (KOR); L 3-11, 11-4, 6-11	did not advance		

Mixed

Athlete	Event	Round of 32	Round of 16	Quarterfinals	Semifinals	Final	
Athlete	Event	Opposition Score	Opposition Score	Opposition Score	Opposition Score	Opposition Score	Rank
(2) Nova Widianto; Vita Marissa	Doubles		Yau / Koon (HKG); W 11-5, 11-5	Zhang / Gao (CHN); W 11-7, 11-4	(4) Sudhisodhi / Thungthongkam (THA); L 11-5, 5-11, 5-11	Did not advance	3rd place, bronze medalist(s)
(3) Tri Kusharjanto; Emma Ermawati	Doubles		Otsuka / Yamamoto (JPN); W 11-5, 9-11,11-0	Chen / Zhang (CHN); L 11-6, 6-11, 9-11	did not advance		

== Beach volleyball ==
Men

Athlete	Event	Preliminary round	Standing	Round of 16	Quarterfinals	Semifinals	Final / BM	
Athlete	Event	Opposition Score	Standing	Opposition Score	Opposition Score	Opposition Score	Opposition Score	Rank
Agus Salim; Koko Prasetyo Darkuncoro	Men's Team	Pool A Mashebin / Sinkevich (KAZ); W 2 – 0 (21–14, 21–15); Sulaiman / Sabah (KUW); W 2 – 0 (21–18, 21–15); Sim / Lee (KOR); W 2 – 1 (21–11, 14–21, 22–20); Bunrueang / Patsorn (THA); W 2 – 0 (21–13, 21–18)	1 Q	Bairami / Al-Kuwari (QAT); W 2 – 0 (21–12, 21–10)	Mashebin / Sinkevich (KAZ); W 2 – 0 (21–19, 22–20)	Li / Zhao (CHN); W 2 – 0 (24–22, 24–22)	Shiratori / Watanabe (JPN); L 0 – 2 (27–29, 17–21)	2nd place, silver medalist(s)
Andy Ardiyansah; Supriadi	Men's Team	Pool C Ebrahim / Abdulameer (BRN); W 2 – 0 (21–19, 21–16); Li / Zhao (CHN); L 0 – 2 (14–21, 18–21); Abdulqader / Al-Muzail (KUW); W 2 – 0 (21–19, 21–17); Zabuslayev / Vorobyev (KAZ); W 2 – 0 (21–18, 21–18)	1 Q	Choi / Park (KOR); W 2 – 0 (21–13, 21–19)	Thongkamnerd / Sawangreung (THA); W 2 – 1 (21–12, 20–22, 15–13)	Shiratori / Watanabe (JPN); L 0 – 2 (14–21, 15–21)	Bronze medal match Li / Zhao (CHN); L 0 – 2 (14–21, 20–22)	4

Women

Athlete	Event	Preliminary round	Standing	Quarterfinals	Semifinals	Final / BM	
Athlete	Event	Opposition Score	Standing	Opposition Score	Opposition Score	Opposition Score	Rank
Timy Yudhani Rahayu; Siti Nurjanah	Women's Team	Pool A Pangka / Arlaisuk (THA); L 0 – 2 (16–21, 16–21); Chang / Kim (KOR); W 2 – 0 (21–16, 21–13); Tian / Wang (CHN); L 0 – 2 (13–21, 11–21)	3 Q	Kulna / Sannok (THA); L 0 – 2 (14–21, 16–21)	Did not advance		5

== Karate ==
Men

Athlete	Event	Round of 16	Quarterfinals	Semifinals	Final	
Athlete	Event	Opposition Score	Opposition Score	Opposition Score	Opposition Score	Rank
Bambang Maulidin	-55 kg	Wan (MAC); W 9 - 1	Al-Otaibi (KUW); W 2 - 0	Kasimov (UZB); L 4 - 9	Bronze medal match Adhikari (NEP); W 3 - 0	3rd place, bronze medalist(s)
Arif Taufan Syamsuddin	-60 kg	Imai (JPN); L 3 - 4	1st repechage Mukhammedzhanov (TJK); L 5 - 6	Did not advance		
Hasan Basri	-65 kg	Hakimov (UZB); W 3 - 1	Shao (TPE); W 8 - 2	Vũ (VIE); W 2 - 2	Amouzadeh (IRI); W 3 - 1	1st place, gold medalist(s)
Sonny Simangasing	-70 kg	Jin (KOR); L 8 - 9	Did not advance			

Women

Athlete	Event	Round of 16	Quarterfinals	Semifinals	Final	
Athlete	Event	Opposition Score	Opposition Score	Opposition Score	Opposition Score	Rank
Jenny Zeannet	-53 kg		Khalid (UAE); W 8 - 1	Vũ (VIE); L 2 - 6	Bronze medal match Hsieh (TPE); L 1 - 3	5

== Sailing ==
Men

Athlete	Event	Race											Total	Rank
Athlete	Event	1	2	3	4	5	6	7	8	9	10	11	Total	Rank
I Gusti Made Oka Sulaksana	Mistral Heavy	~~(2)~~	1	1	1	1	1	2	2	2	2	~~(7)~~; DNC	13	1st place, gold medalist(s)
Fadly Faisal Yusuf	Raceboard Light	~~(6)~~	6	6	5	6	6	4	4	6	4	~~(7)~~; DNC	47	6

== Tennis ==
Men

Athlete	Event	Round of 32	Round of 16	Quarterfinals	Semifinals	Final	
Athlete	Event	Opposition Score	Opposition Score	Opposition Score	Opposition Score	Opposition Score	Rank
(4) Suwandi; Peter Handoyo	Doubles	Bye	Rithiwattanapong / Samrej (THA); W 6-2, 6-3	(8) Kwon / Kim (KOR); L 2-6, 7-6 (9-7), 6-8	did not advance		
(6) Suwandi; Peter Handoyo; Tintus Wibowo	Team	Bye	Saudi Arabia (KSA); W 3-0	(2) Chinese Taipei (TPE); W 2-1	(3) South Korea (KOR); L 0-3	Did not advance	3rd place, bronze medalist(s)

Women

Athlete	Event	Round of 32	Round of 16	Quarterfinals	Semifinals	Final	
Athlete	Event	Opposition Score	Opposition Score	Opposition Score	Opposition Score	Opposition Score	Rank
(4) Angelique Widjaja	Singles	Bye	Hsieh (TPE); W 6-0, 6-2	(7) Asagoe (JPN); L 5-7, 3-6	did not advance		
(6) Wynne Prakusya	Singles	Bye	Wang (TPE); W 6-4, 7-6 (7-1)	(2) Tulyaganova (JPN); L 2-6, 3-6	did not advance		
(1) Angelique Widjaja; Wynne Prakusya	Doubles		Bye	Li / Sun (CHN); W 7-5, 6-2	Obata / Morigami (JPN); W 6-3, 3-6, 9-7	Kim / Choi (KOR); L 6-7 (4-7), 6-1, 3-6	2nd place, silver medalist(s)
Wukirasih Sawondari; Liza Andriyani	Doubles		(2) Yan / Zheng (CHN); L 4-6, 4-6	did not advance			
(1) Liza Andriyani; Wynne Prakusya; Wukirasih Sawondari; Angelique Widjaja	Team		Bye	China (CHN); W 3-0	South Korea (KOR); W 3-0	Japan (JPN); W 2-1	1st place, gold medalist(s)

Mixed

Athlete	Event	Round of 32	Round of 16	Quarterfinals	Semifinals	Final	
Athlete	Event	Opposition Score	Opposition Score	Opposition Score	Opposition Score	Opposition Score	Rank
Suwandi; Liza Andriyani	Doubles	Bye	(5) Xu / Sun (CHN); L 2-6, 6-4, 4-6	did not advance			
Peter Handoyo; Wukirasih Sawondari	Doubles	Bye	(6) Wang / Chuang (TPE); L 5-7, 6-4, 5-7	did not advance			
