= Tennis at the 2002 Asian Games – Men's singles =

Men's singles at the 2002 Asian Games
- Venue: Geumjeong Tennis Stadium
- Dates: 7–12 October 2002
- Competitors: 36 from 18 nations

Medalists
gold medal	Paradorn Srichaphan	Thailand
silver medal	Lee Hyung-taik	South Korea
bronze medal	Oleg Ogorodov	Uzbekistan
bronze medal	Takao Suzuki	Japan

Men's singles
- Tennis at the 2002 Asian Games

Events
Singles	men	women
Doubles	men	women	mixed
Team	men	women
Asian Games

The men's singles tennis event was part of the tennis programme and took place between October 7 and 12, at the Geumjeong Tennis Stadium.

== Schedule ==
All times are Korea Standard Time (UTC+09:00)

Date	Time	Event
Monday, 7 October 2002	10:00	1st round
Monday, 7 October 2002	10:00	2nd round
Tuesday, 8 October 2002	10:00	2nd round
Tuesday, 8 October 2002	10:00	3rd round
Wednesday, 9 October 2002	10:00	3rd round
Thursday, 10 October 2002	10:00	Quarterfinals
Friday, 11 October 2002	10:00	Semifinals
Saturday, 12 October 2002	12:00	Final

== Results ==
Legend

- r — Retired

=== Finals ===
Semifinals					Final
1	Paradorn Srichaphan (THA)	6	6
4	Oleg Ogorodov (UZB)	3	3		1	Paradorn Srichaphan (THA)	7^{7}	6
3	Takao Suzuki (JPN)	4	6	3	2	Lee Hyung-taik (KOR)	6^{3}	4
2	Lee Hyung-taik (KOR)	6	2	6

=== Top half ===
==== Section 1 ====
1st round
Antonio Mendes (TMP)	0	2
Sergei Makashin (TJK)	6	6

2nd round
1	Paradorn Srichaphan (THA)	6	6
Eduard Koifman (KGZ)	0	1
Sergei Makashin (TJK)	6	6^{4}	6
15	Nasser Al-Khelaifi (QAT)	4	7^{7}	3
13	Yoon Yong-il (KOR)	6	6
Mahmoud Nader Al-Baloushi (UAE)	1	3
Lei Hou In (MAC)	0	0
7	Lu Yen-hsun (TPE)	6	6

3rd round
1	Paradorn Srichaphan (THA)	6	6
Sergei Makashin (TJK)	0	2
13	Yoon Yong-il (KOR)	3	5
7	Lu Yen-hsun (TPE)	6	7

Quarterfinals
1	Paradorn Srichaphan (THA)	6	6
7	Lu Yen-hsun (TPE)	0	4

==== Section 2 ====
1st round
Wayne Wong (HKG)	6	6
Fahad Al-Saad (KSA)	2	1

2nd round
4	Oleg Ogorodov (UZB)	6	6
Baataryn Oyuunbold (MGL)	1	2
Wayne Wong (HKG)	5	6	6
14	Wang Yu (CHN)	7	3	3
12	Sunil Kumar Sipaeya (IND)	6	6
Amrit Rupasinghe (SRI)	1	2
Aqeel Khan (PAK)	1	1
6	Goichi Motomura (JPN)	6	6

3rd round
4	Oleg Ogorodov (UZB)	6	6
Wayne Wong (HKG)	3	2
12	Sunil Kumar Sipaeya (IND)	2	6^{1}
6	Goichi Motomura (JPN)	6	7^{7}

Quarterfinals
4	Oleg Ogorodov (UZB)	6	6
6	Goichi Motomura (JPN)	4	3

=== Bottom half ===
==== Section 3 ====
1st round
Matias de Souza (TMP)	6	6
Sükhbaataryn Sükhjargal (MGL)	1	1

2nd round
8	Danai Udomchoke (THA)	5
Omar Al-Thagib (KSA)	0^{r}
Rashid Malik (PAK)	3	2
9	Jimmy Wang (TPE)	6	6
11	Rohan Bopanna (IND)	6	6
Matias de Souza (TMP)	2	0
Kuan Chu Shek (MAC)	0	0
3	Takao Suzuki (JPN)	6	6

3rd round
8	Danai Udomchoke (THA)	3	2
9	Jimmy Wang (TPE)	6	6
11	Rohan Bopanna (IND)	5	2
3	Takao Suzuki (JPN)	7	6

Quarterfinals
9	Jimmy Wang (TPE)	1	1
3	Takao Suzuki (JPN)	6	6

==== Section 4 ====
1st round
Mansour Yakhyaev (TJK)	6	6
Renouk Wijemanne (SRI)	2	2

2nd round
5	Vadim Kutsenko (UZB)	6	6
Ruslan Eshmuhamedov (KGZ)	4	0
Mansour Yakhyaev (TJK)	6	6
16	Omar Al-Awadhi (UAE)	4	2
10	Zhu Benqiang (CHN)	6	6
Sultan Al-Alawi (QAT)	3	0
Yu Hiu Tung (HKG)	0	1
2	Lee Hyung-taik (KOR)	6	6

3rd round
5	Vadim Kutsenko (UZB)	6	6
Mansour Yakhyaev (TJK)	4	4
10	Zhu Benqiang (CHN)	1	3
2	Lee Hyung-taik (KOR)	6	6

Quarterfinals
5	Vadim Kutsenko (UZB)	3	1
2	Lee Hyung-taik (KOR)	6	6
