= Lee Hyung-taik =

South Korean tennis player (born 1976)

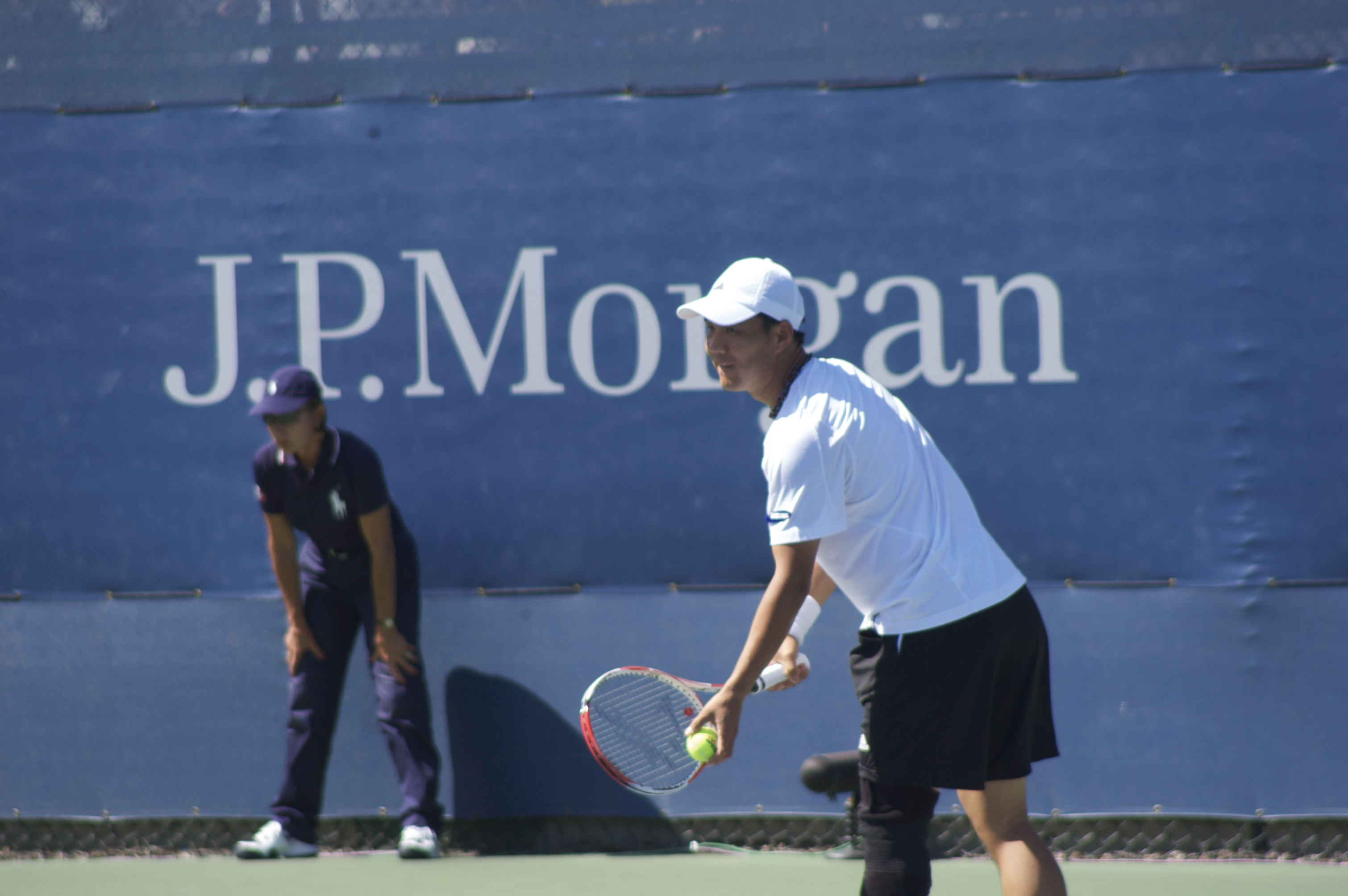
- Country (sports): South Korea
- Residence: Seoul, South Korea
- Born: 3 January 1976 (age 49) Hoengseong, South Korea
- Height: 1.80 m (5 ft 11 in)
- Turned pro: 1995
- Retired: 2009
- Plays: Right-handed (one-handed backhand)
- Prize money: $2,355,686

Singles
- Career record: 161–164
- Career titles: 1
- Highest ranking: No. 36 (6 August 2007)

Grand Slam singles results
- Australian Open: 2R (2003, 2008)
- French Open: 3R (2004, 2005)
- Wimbledon: 3R (2007)
- US Open: 4R (2000, 2007)

Other tournaments
- Olympic Games: 2R (2004)

Doubles
- Career record: 40–72
- Career titles: 1
- Highest ranking: No. 95 (16 January 2006)

Grand Slam doubles results
- Australian Open: 2R (2005, 2008)
- French Open: 3R (2005)
- Wimbledon: 1R (2003, 2005, 2007)
- US Open: 2R (2003, 2007)

Other doubles tournaments
- Olympic Games: 2R (2000)

Korean name
- Hangul: 이형택
- Hanja: 李亨澤
- RR: I Hyeongtaek
- MR: I Hyŏngt'aek
Medal record
Men's tennis
Representing South Korea
Asian Games
Gold medal – first place	1998 Bangkok	Men's team
Gold medal – first place	2006 Doha	Men's team
Silver medal – second place	1998 Bangkok	Men's doubles
Silver medal – second place	2002 Busan	Men's singles
Silver medal – second place	2002 Busan	Men's doubles
Silver medal – second place	2002 Busan	Men's team
Silver medal – second place	2006 Doha	Men's singles
Summer Universiade
Gold medal – first place	1997 Catania	Men's doubles
Gold medal – first place	1999 Palma	Men's singles
Silver medal – second place	1995 Fukuoka	Men's singles
- Last updated on: 21 July 2022.

Lee Hyung-taik (Korean: 이형택, born 3 January 1976) is a former professional tennis player from South Korea. He won one singles title and achieved a career-high singles ranking of world No. 36, in August 2007.

== Personal life ==
Lee was born in a potato-farming village in Hoengseong County, South Korea. He began playing tennis at age nine with a school teacher. After retirement, he is running his own academy in Gangwon province in the tennis center at Song-ahm Sports Town in Chuncheon named "Lee Hyung Taik Tennis Academy", which opened on 12 September 2009.

== Tennis career ==
=== 2000 ===
With the help of Coach Hee June Choi, Lee made a splash at the US Open tournament, reaching the fourth round before losing to Pete Sampras. En route to his fourth-round appearance against Sampras, Lee defeated Jeff Tarango, 13th seed Franco Squillari, and future Australian Open runner-up Rainer Schüttler.

=== 2003 ===
In 2003, Lee became the first Korean to win ATP Tour singles and doubles titles by winning the singles tournament at the Sydney International as a qualifier (beating Juan Carlos Ferrero in the final) and the doubles tournament at the Siebel Open in San Jose, California (partnering with Belarusian Vladimir Voltchkov).

At Wimbledon, he was defeated in the first round by eventual champion Roger Federer in straight sets.

=== 2006 ===
In the second round at Wimbledon, Lee was defeated by former champion and two-time semifinalist Lleyton Hewitt in five sets, including three tie-breakers. Lee had set points in the third set tie-breaker, but went on to lose the set after an incorrect line call. As Lee went on to win the fourth set the call probably prevented him winning the match against the eventual quarterfinalist.

=== 2007 ===
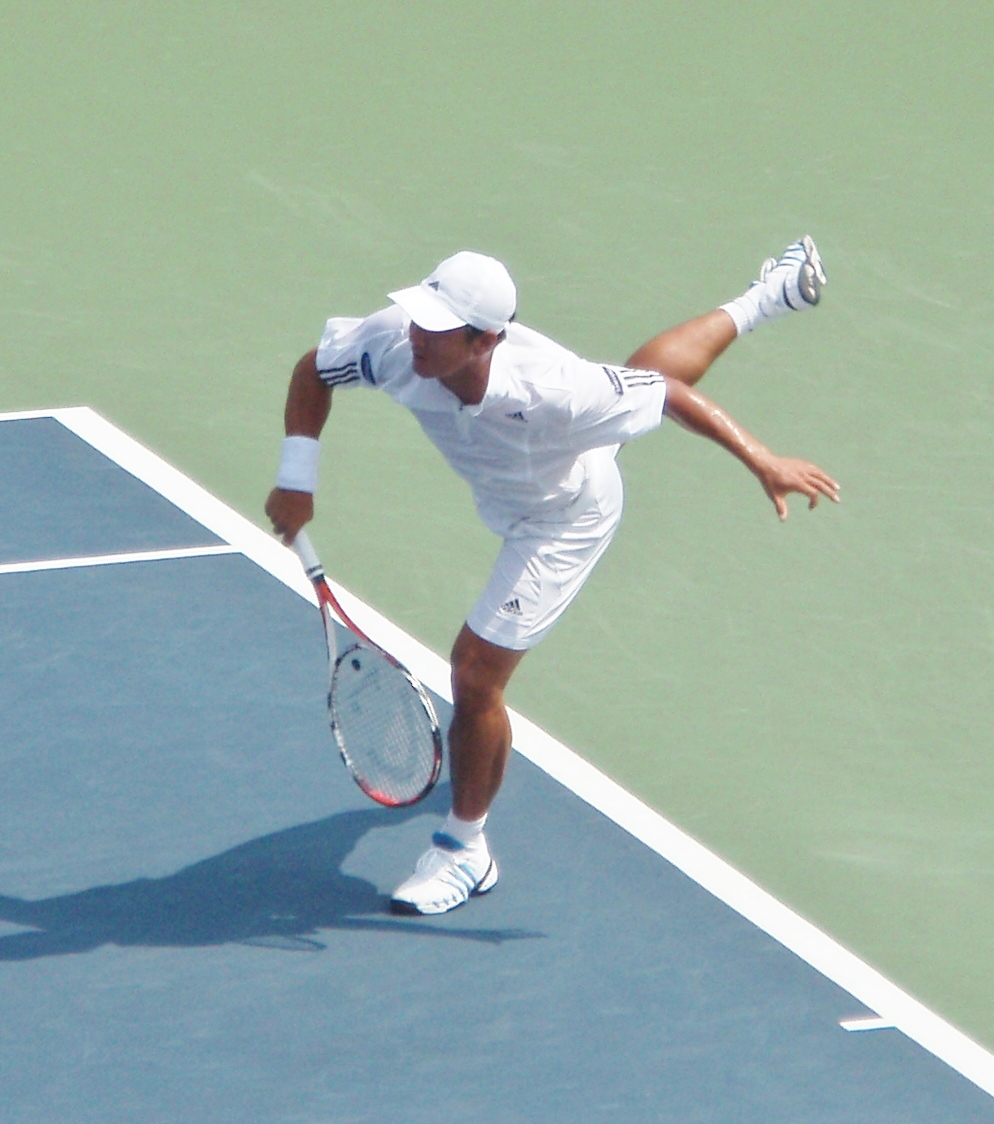
Lee at the 2007 US Open

Lee matched his best Grand Slam performance by making the fourth round of the US Open tournament. In the first round, he was forced to five sets before defeating Dominik Hrbatý. Lee was pit against Guillermo Cañas, who was the fourteenth seed in the tournament, in the second round. He defeated Cañas in three sets, setting up a third round showdown against nineteenth seed Andy Murray. Lee got out to a quick two set advantage against Murray, eventually winning in four sets. In the fourth round, Lee played fourth seed Nikolay Davydenko, who defeated the Korean in three sets.

His fourth round showing at the US Open capped a very successful hardcourt series. During the US Open Series, Lee reached the semifinals at the Countrywide Classic in Los Angeles, the quarterfinals at the Indianapolis Tennis Championships and at the Legg Mason Tennis Classic.

Lee set personal bests in a handful of categories, including match wins and money earned. He won a career-high 25 matches and earned $386,230. Overall, Lee compiled records of 16–15 on hard, 5–5 on clay, 3–3 on grass and 1–0 on carpet. In August, he achieved his career best ranking in singles as world No. 36 with the help of his coach, Hee June Choi.

=== 2008 ===
In the 2008 season, Lee had a disappointing losing streak and eventually fell out of the top 100. He did, however, match his best Masters Series result by making the fourth round of Indian Wells, beating Michaël Llodra, Jarkko Nieminen and No. 5 seed David Ferrer along the way.

=== 2009 ===
In 2009, Lee played one final time for Korea, in the Davis Cup play-off between Korea and China. He announced his retirement from pro tennis after the Davis Cup match, with Korea triumphing 3–2.

=== Doubles ===
Lee sometimes played doubles alongside Korean-American player Kevin Kim. The pair reached the third round of the 2005 French Open.

== Playing style ==
Lee is right-handed and uses a single-handed backhand. He considers his backhand as his best shot. His favorite surface is hardcourt. He was coached by countryman and former ATP professional Yoon Yong-il (since March 2006).

== ATP career finals ==
=== Singles: 2 (1 title, 1 runner-up) ===
Legend Grand Slam Tournaments (0–0) ATP World Tour Finals (0–0) ATP Masters 1000 Series (0–0) ATP 500 Series (0–0) ATP 250 Series (1–1)	Finals by surface Hard (1–0) Clay (0–1) Grass (0–0) Carpet (0–0)	Finals by setting Outdoors (1–1) Indoors (0–0)

Result	W–L	Date	Tournament	Tier	Surface	Opponent	Score
Loss	0–1	May 2001	Houston, United States	World Series	Clay	(United States) Andy Roddick	5–7, 3–6
Win	1–1	Jan 2003	Sydney, Australia	World Series	Hard	(Spain) Juan Carlos Ferrero	4–6, 7–6^{(8–6)}, 7–6^{(7–4)}

=== Doubles: 1 (1 title) ===
Legend Grand Slam Tournaments (0–0) ATP World Tour Finals (0–0) ATP Masters 1000 Series (0–0) ATP 500 Series (0–0) ATP 250 Series (1–0)	Finals by surface Hard (1–0) Clay (0–0) Grass (0–0) Carpet (0–0)	Finals by setting Outdoors (0–0) Indoors (1–0)

Result	W–L	Date	Tournament	Tier	Surface	Partner	Opponents	Score
Win	1–0	Feb 2003	San Jose, United States	World Series	Hard	(Belarus) Vladimir Voltchkov	(United States) Paul Goldstein (United States) Robert Kendrick	7–5, 4–6, 6–3

== ATP Challenger and ITF Futures finals ==
=== Singles: 27 (22–5) ===
Legend ATP Challenger (13–4) ITF Futures (9–1)	Finals by surface Hard (16–3) Clay (1–1) Grass (0–0) Carpet (5–1)

Result	W–L	Date	Tournament	Tier	Surface	Opponent	Score
Win	1–0	May 1998	Korea F1, Sogwipo	Futures	Hard	(Thailand) Paradorn Srichaphan	6–3, 6–3
Win	2–0	Jun 1998	Korea F2, Sogwipo	Futures	Hard	(Israel) Nir Welgreen	6–0, 6–3
Win	3–0	Jun 1998	Canada F2, Montreal	Futures	Hard	(United States) Michael Russell	6–0, 7–5
Win	4–0	Jul 1998	Canada F3, Boucherville	Futures	Hard	(Australia) James Sekulov	4–6, 6–4, 6–1
Loss	4–1	Aug 1998	Lexington, United States	Challenger	Hard	(United States) Paul Goldstein	1–6, 4–6
Win	5–1	Oct 1998	Japan F4, Maishima	Futures	Carpet	(South Korea) Yoon Yong-Il	7–6, 2–6, 6–4
Win	6–1	Mar 1999	Japan F1, Isawa	Futures	Clay	(Japan) Gouichi Motomura	7–6, 1–6, 5–2 ret.
Win	7–1	May 1999	China F1, Beijing	Futures	Hard	(Uzbekistan) Dmitriy Tomashevich	6–3, 6–2
Win	8–1	May 1999	China F2, Shenyang	Futures	Hard	(Thailand) Danai Udomchoke	6–0, 6–0
Loss	8–2	May 1999	Korea F2, Seoul	Futures	Clay	(South Korea) Baek Seung-bok	6–3, 2–6, 2–6
Win	9–2	Oct 1999	Japan F5, Kobe	Futures	Carpet	(South Korea) Kwon Oh-Hee	6–1, 7–5
Win	10–2	Nov 1999	Yokohama, Japan	Challenger	Carpet	(Thailand) Paradorn Srichaphan	6–3, 6–0
Win	11–2	Aug 2000	Bronx, United States	Challenger	Hard	(Belgium) Reginald Willems	6–4, 6–1
Win	12–2	Nov 2000	Seoul, South Korea	Challenger	Hard	(Czech Republic) Radek Štěpánek	6–4, 6–4
Loss	12–3	Nov 2000	Osaka, Japan	Challenger	Hard	(Switzerland) Michel Kratochvil	6–2, 2–6, 2–6
Win	13–3	Oct 2001	Seoul, South Korea	Challenger	Hard	(Japan) Gouichi Motomura	6–3, 6–4
Win	14–3	Dec 2002	Yokohama, Japan	Challenger	Carpet	(Netherlands) John van Lottum	2–6, 7–6^{(2–7)}, 7–6^{(8–6)}
Win	15–3	Sep 2003	Seoul, South Korea	Challenger	Hard	(Netherlands) Dennis van Scheppingen	6–3, 6–3
Win	16–3	Sep 2004	Seoul, South Korea	Challenger	Hard	(Monaco) Jean-René Lisnard	3–6, 7–5, 6–2
Loss	16–4	Dec 2004	Port Louis, Mauritius	Challenger	Hard	(Romania) Andrei Pavel	3–6, 1–6
Win	17–4	Oct 2005	Seoul, South Korea	Challenger	Hard	(France) Nicolas Thomann	4–6, 6–1, 7–6^{(8–6)}
Win	18–4	Jun 2006	Busan, South Korea	Challenger	Hard	(Thailand) Danai Udomchoke	6–3, 6–2
Win	19–4	Jul 2006	Lexington, United States	Challenger	Hard	(United States) Amer Delić	5–7, 6–2, 6–3
Win	20–4	Nov 2006	Seoul, South Korea	Challenger	Hard	(Germany) Björn Phau	6–2, 6–2
Win	21–4	Oct 2008	Seoul, South Korea	Challenger	Hard	(Czech Republic) Ivo Minář	6–4, 6–0
Win	22–4	Nov 2008	Yokohama, Japan	Challenger	Carpet	(Japan) Go Soeda	7–5, 6–3
Loss	22–5	Nov 2008	Toyota, Japan	Challenger	Carpet	(Japan) Go Soeda	2–6, 6–7^{(7–9)}

=== Doubles: 22 (14–8) ===
Legend ATP Challenger (5–4) ITF Futures (9–4)	Finals by surface Hard (10–5) Clay (3–1) Grass (0–0) Carpet (1–2)

Result	W–L	Date	Tournament	Tier	Surface	Partner	Opponents	Score
Win	1–0	Oct 1996	Seoul, South Korea	Challenger	Clay	(South Korea) Yoon Yong-Il	(Sweden) Fredrik Bergh (Sweden) Patrik Fredriksson	6–4, 6–4
Win	2–0	Mar 1998	Philippines F2, Manila	Futures	Hard	(Chinese Taipei) Chen Chih-Jung	(United States) David Caldwell (United States) Chris Tontz	6–1, 6–4
Win	3–0	May 1998	China F2, Tianjin	Futures	Hard	(South Korea) Yoon Yong-Il	(Chinese Taipei) Chen Chih-Jung (Indonesia) Andrian Raturandang	6–1, 5–7, 6–3
Loss	3–1	Jul 1998	Canada F3, Boucherville	Futures	Hard	(South Korea) Yoon Yong-Il	(United States) Tad Berkowitz (Mexico) Javier Gutierrez-Lima	3–6, 6–1, 3–6
Win	4–1	Oct 1998	Japan F4, Maishima	Futures	Carpet	(South Korea) Yoon Yong-Il	(Chinese Taipei) Chen Chih-Jung (Chinese Taipei) Lin Bing-Chao	6–4, 1–4 ret.
Loss	4–2	Mar 1999	Kyoto, Japan	Challenger	Carpet	(Italy) Giorgio Galimberti	(Austria) Julian Knowle (Switzerland) Lorenzo Manta	1–6, 7–6, 2–6
Win	5–2	Mar 1999	Japan F1, Isawa	Futures	Clay	(United States) Kevin Kim	(United States) Mitty Arnold (United States) Todd Meringoff	6–4, 6–4
Loss	5–3	May 1999	Korea F1, Seoul	Futures	Clay	(South Korea) Han Min-kyu	(South Korea) Chung Hee-Seok (South Korea) Chung Hee-sung	4–6, 4–6
Win	6–3	May 1999	Korea F2, Seoul	Futures	Clay	(South Korea) Kim Dong-Hyun	(South Korea) Han Min-kyu (South Korea) Lee Sang-Hoon	6–3, 6–4
Loss	6–4	Aug 1999	Binghamton, United States	Challenger	Hard	(United States) Kevin Kim	(United States) Mitch Sprengelmeyer (South Africa) Jason Weir-Smith	7–5, 4–6, 2–6
Loss	6–5	Oct 1999	Japan F5, Kobe	Futures	Carpet	(Thailand) Danai Udomchoke	(Japan) Tasuku Iwami (Japan) Ryuso Tsujino	5–7, 6–4, 4–6
Win	7–5	May 2000	Japan F4, Fukuoka	Futures	Hard	(South Korea) Yoon Yong-Il	(United States) Doug Bohaboy (United States) Alex Witt	6–7^{(4–7)}, 7–5, 6–2
Win	8–5	Jul 2000	Granby, Canada	Challenger	Hard	(South Korea) Yoon Yong-Il	(Canada) Frédéric Niemeyer (Canada) Jerry Turek	7–6^{(7–3)}, 6–3
Win	9–5	Jul 2000	Winnetka, United States	Challenger	Hard	(South Korea) Yoon Yong-Il	(Australia) Matthew Breen (Australia) Luke Smith	2–6, 7–5, 6–3
Loss	9–6	Aug 2000	Bronx, United States	Challenger	Hard	(South Korea) Yoon Yong-Il	(Czech Republic) Petr Luxa (South Africa) Wesley Whitehouse	6–3, 3–6, 2–6
Win	10–6	Sep 2003	Seoul, South Korea	Challenger	Hard	(United States) Alex Kim	(United States) Alex Bogomolov Jr. (United States) Jeff Salzenstein	1–6, 6–1, 6–4
Win	11–6	May 2004	Korea F1, Seogwipo	Futures	Hard	(South Korea) Im Kyu-Tae	(South Korea) Chung Hee-Seok (South Korea) Chung Hee-sung	7–5, 6–4
Win	12–6	Mar 2006	Ho Chi Minh City, Vietnam	Challenger	Hard	(United States) Cecil Mamiit	(Sweden) Jacob Adaktusson (Israel) Dudi Sela	6–4, 6–2
Loss	12–7	Apr 2006	Korea F3, Seogwipo	Futures	Hard	(South Korea) Chung Hee-Seok	(South Korea) Jun Woong-sun (South Korea) Kim Sun-Yong	2–6, 0–6
Win	13–7	Apr 2014	Korea F1, Seoul	Futures	Hard	(South Korea) Lim Yong-kyu	(Brazil) Henrique Cunha (United States) Daniel Nguyen	6–2, 4–6, [10–4]
Loss	13–8	May 2015	Seoul, South Korea	Challenger	Hard	(Thailand) Danai Udomchoke	(China) Gong Maoxin (Chinese Taipei) Peng Hsien-yin	4–6, 5–7
Win	14–8	May 2015	Korea F1, Daegu	Futures	Hard	(South Korea) Hong Seong Chan	(South Korea) Nam Jisung (South Korea) Song Min-kyu	6–3, 6–3

== Performance timelines ==
Key
W	F	SF	QF	#R	RR	Q#	P#	DNQ	A	Z#	PO	G	S	B	NMS	NTI	P	NH

(W) winner; (F) finalist; (SF) semifinalist; (QF) quarterfinalist; (#R) rounds 4, 3, 2, 1; (RR) round-robin stage; (Q#) qualification round; (P#) preliminary round; (DNQ) did not qualify; (A) absent; (Z#) Davis/Fed Cup Zonal Group (with number indication) or (PO) play-off; (G) gold, (S) silver or (B) bronze Olympic/Paralympic medal; (NMS) not a Masters tournament; (NTI) not a Tier I tournament; (P) postponed; (NH) not held; (SR) strike rate (events won / competed); (W–L) win–loss record.

=== Singles ===
Tournament	1996	1997	1998	1999	2000	2001	2002	2003	2004	2005	2006	2007	2008	2009	SR	W–L	Win%
Grand Slam tournaments
Australian Open	Q1	A	A	Q1	Q1	1R	A	2R	1R	1R	1R	1R	2R	Q1	0 / 7	2–7	22%
French Open	A	A	A	A	A	A	1R	1R	3R	3R	Q1	1R	2R	A	0 / 6	5–6	45%
Wimbledon	A	A	A	A	Q2	1R	2R	1R	Q2	2R	2R	3R	1R	A	0 / 7	5–7	42%
US Open	A	A	Q1	Q1	4R	1R	1R	2R	3R	1R	2R	4R	1R	A	0 / 9	10–9	53%
Win–loss	0–0	0–0	0–0	0–0	3–1	0–3	1–3	2–4	4–3	3–4	2–3	5–4	2–4	0–0	0 / 29	22–29	43%
Olympic Games
Summer Olympics	A	Not Held			1R	Not Held			2R	Not Held			1R	NH	0 / 3	1–3	25%
ATP Tour Masters 1000
Indian Wells	A	A	A	A	A	Q1	Q1	1R	1R	1R	A	1R	4R	A	0 / 5	3–5	38%
Miami	A	A	A	A	A	1R	Q1	4R	1R	3R	A	1R	1R	A	0 / 6	5–6	45%
Monte Carlo	A	A	A	A	A	A	A	2R	A	1R	A	3R	1R	A	0 / 4	3–4	43%
Hamburg	A	A	A	A	A	A	A	1R	A	A	A	A	A	NMS	0 / 1	0–1	0%
Rome	A	A	A	A	A	A	A	A	A	A	A	A	1R	A	0 / 1	0–1	0%
Canada	A	A	A	A	A	1R	2R	1R	1R	A	2R	1R	A	A	0 / 6	2–6	25%
Cincinnati	A	A	A	A	A	2R	2R	1R	A	A	2R	A	A	A	0 / 4	3–4	43%
Win–loss	0–0	0–0	0–0	0–0	0–0	1–3	2–2	4–6	0–3	2–3	2–2	2–4	3–4	0–0	0 / 27	16–27	37%

=== Doubles ===
Tournament	1996	1997	1998	1999	2000	2001	2002	2003	2004	2005	2006	2007	2008	SR	W–L	Win%
Grand Slam tournaments
Australian Open	A	A	A	A	A	A	A	1R	1R	2R	A	1R	2R	0 / 5	2–5	29%
French Open	A	A	A	A	A	A	A	2R	A	3R	A	2R	2R	0 / 4	5–4	56%
Wimbledon	A	A	A	A	A	A	A	1R	A	1R	A	1R	A	0 / 3	0–3	0%
US Open	A	A	A	A	A	A	A	2R	A	A	A	2R	A	0 / 2	2–2	50%
Win–loss	0–0	0–0	0–0	0–0	0–0	0–0	0–0	2–4	0–1	3–3	0–0	2–4	2–2	0 / 14	9–14	39%
Olympic Games
Summer Olympics	1R	Not Held			2R	Not Held			A	Not Held			A	0 / 2	1–2	33%

== Filmography ==
=== Television shows ===
Year	Title	Role	Notes	Ref.
2019-2021	The Gentlemen's League (뭉쳐야 찬다)	Cast Member	a.k.a (Let's Play Soccer)	
2020	King of Mask Singer	Contestant	as "Oriole" – (episode 273)	
2021-2023	The Gentlemen's League 2	Cast Member	a.k.a (Let's Play Soccer 2)	
2022	Can't Cheat Blood	Participant		
2022–2023	Korea Badminton	Cast Member		
2023	Tomorrow's Winning Shot	Director		
