= Lee Seung-hoon (tennis) =

South Korean tennis player

- Country (sports): South Korea
- Born: 22 May 1979 (age 46)
- Plays: Right-handed
- Prize money: $33,511

Singles
- Career record: 0–3 (Davis Cup)
- Highest ranking: No. 391 (8 Nov 2004)

Doubles
- Highest ranking: No. 667 (13 Sep 2004)
Medal record
Universiade
Gold medal – first place	2001 Beijing	Singles
Bronze medal – third place	1999 Palma	Singles

Lee Seung-hoon (born 22 May 1979) is a South Korean former professional tennis player.

Lee, a number one ranked Korean junior, was a member of the South Korea Davis Cup team in 2000 and 2001. One of his singles rubbers was a loss to New Zealand's Mark Nielsen in a match decided 7–9 in the fifth set. He studied at Myongji University and won a singles gold medal for South Korea at the 2001 Summer Universiade in Beijing. During his career he captured four ITF Futures singles titles, with a best world ranking of 391.

== ITF Futures finals ==
=== Singles: 6 (4–2) ===
Result	W–L	Date	Tournament	Surface	Opponent	Score
Loss	0–1	Jun 2000	Korea F2, Seoul	Clay	(South Korea) Chung Hee-seok	3–6, 3–6
Win	1–1	Jun 2001	Korea Rep. F1, Seoul	Clay	(South Korea) Chung Hee-seok	6–4, 6–4
Loss	1–2	Aug 2001	Chinese Taipei F1, Kaohsiung	Hard	(South Korea) Kim Dong-hyun	3–6, 5–7
Win	2–2	Aug 2004	Indonesia F1, Jakarta	Hard	(South Korea) Kwon Oh-hee	3–6, 6–4, 7–6^{(2)}
Win	3–2	Aug 2004	Indonesia F3, Semarang	Hard	(Japan) Takahiro Terachi	6–1, 3–6, 6–4
Win	4–2	Aug 2007	Indonesia F1, Makassar	Hard	(Australia) Sadik Kadir	6–3, 6–2

=== Doubles: 5 (3–2) ===
Result	W–L	Date	Tournament	Surface	Partner	Opponents	Score
Loss	0–1	May 2000	Korea F1, Seoul	Clay	(South Korea) Oh Seung-hoon	(South Korea) Kim Dong-hyun (South Korea) Lee Chang-hoon	3–6, 6–4, 2–6
Loss	0–2	May 2002	Korea Rep. F2, Cheongju	Clay	(South Korea) Kim Young-jun	(South Korea) Im Sung-ho (South Korea) Kwon Oh-hee	w/o
Win	1–2	Mar 2004	New Zealand F1, Blenheim	Hard	(South Korea) Im Kyu-tae	(Canada) Philip Gubenco (Australia) Domenic Marafiote	2–6, 6–2, 6–3
Win	2–2	Mar 2004	New Zealand F3, North Shore	Hard	(South Korea) Im Kyu-tae	(New Zealand) Daniel King-Turner (New Zealand) Matt Prentice	6–2, 3–6, 6–4
Win	3–2	May 2008	Korea Rep. F2, Changwon	Hard	(South Korea) Kim Young-jun	(Japan) Tasuku Iwami (Japan) Hiroyasu Sato	3–6, 6–3, [10–1]

== See also ==
- List of South Korea Davis Cup team representatives
