= Tennis at the 2002 Asian Games – Women's team =

Women's team at the 2002 Asian Games
- Venue: Geumjeong Tennis Stadium
- Dates: 2–5 October 2002
- Competitors: 31 from 9 nations

Medalists
| gold medal | Indonesia; Liza Andriyani, Wynne Prakusya, Wukirasih Sawondari, Angelique Widjaja |
| silver medal | Japan; Shinobu Asagoe, Saori Obata, Miho Saeki, Yuka Yoshida |
| bronze medal | South Korea; Cho Yoon-jeong, Choi Young-ja, Chung Yang-jin, Jeon Mi-ra |
| bronze medal | Chinese Taipei; Chan Chin-wei, Chuang Chia-jung, Hsieh Su-wei, Janet Lee |

Women's team
- Tennis at the 2002 Asian Games

Events
| Singles | men | women |
| Doubles | men | women | mixed |
| Team | men | women |
| Asian Games |

The women's team tennis event was part of the tennis programme and took place between October 2 and 5, at the Geumjeong Tennis Stadium.

Indonesia won the gold medal.

== Schedule ==
All times are Korea Standard Time (UTC+09:00)

| Date | Time | Event |
|---|---|---|
| Wednesday, 2 October 2002 | 10:00 | 1st round |
| Thursday, 3 October 2002 | 10:00 | Quarterfinals |
| Friday, 4 October 2002 | 10:00 | Quarterfinals |
| Friday, 4 October 2002 | 10:00 | Semifinals |
| Saturday, 5 October 2002 | 10:00 | Final |

== Results ==
1st round
Mongolia | 0
India | 3

Quarterfinals
1 | Indonesia | 3
China | 0
3 | South Korea | 3
Thailand | 0
India | 0
4 | Chinese Taipei | 2
Kyrgyzstan | 0
2 | Japan | 2

Semifinals
1 | Indonesia | 3
3 | South Korea | 0
4 | Chinese Taipei | 0
2 | Japan | 2

Final
1 | Indonesia | 2
2 | Japan | 1

=== 1st round ===
| 2 October | Mongolia | 0–3 | India |

Enkhjargalyn Khaliun | 0–2 | Sania Mirza | 0–6, 1–6
Khishigtogtokhyn Khandsüren | 0–2 | Rushmi Chakravarthi | 0–6, 0–6
Enkhjargalyn Khaliun / Natsagsürengiin Jigjidsüren | 0–2 | Nirupama Vaidyanathan / Rushmi Chakravarthi | 0–6, 0–6

=== Quarterfinals ===
| 3 October | Indonesia | 3–0 | China |

Wynne Prakusya | 2–1 | Sun Tiantian | 4–6, 6–4, 6–3
Angelique Widjaja | 2–0 | Zheng Jie | 6–3, 7–5
Wukirasih Sawondari / Liza Andriyani | 2–0 | Yan Zi / Zheng Jie | 6–2, 7–6

| 3 October | South Korea | 3–0 | Thailand |

Jeon Mi-ra | 2–0 | Prariyawan Ratanakrong | 6–1, 6–0
Cho Yoon-jeong | 2–0 | Napaporn Tongsalee | 6–1, 6–2
Chung Yang-jin / Choi Young-ja | 2–1 | Napaporn Tongsalee / Prariyawan Ratanakrong | 6–2, 4–6, 6–1

| 4 October | India | 0–2 | Chinese Taipei |

Sania Mirza | 1–2 | Janet Lee | 6–4, 6–7, 2–6
Nirupama Vaidyanathan | 0–2 | Hsieh Su-wei | 4–6, 1–6

| 4 October | Kyrgyzstan | 0–2 | Japan |

Kunykei Koichumananova | 0–2 | Miho Saeki | 0–6, 1–6
Yulia Klimchenko | 0–2 | Saori Obata | 2–6, 0–6

=== Semifinals ===
| 4 October | Indonesia | 3–0 | South Korea |

Wynne Prakusya | 2–1 | Jeon Mi-ra | 4–6, 6–2, 3–4, Retired
Angelique Widjaja | 2–1 | Cho Yoon-jeong | 1–6, 6–3, 7–5
Wynne Prakusya / Angelique Widjaja | 2–1 | Cho Yoon-jeong / Choi Young-ja | 3–6, 7–6, 6–1

| 4 October | Chinese Taipei | 0–2 | Japan |

Janet Lee | 0–2 | Miho Saeki | 2–6, 4–6
Hsieh Su-wei | 1–2 | Saori Obata | 6–3, 4–6, 5–7

=== Final ===
| 5 October | Indonesia | 2–1 | Japan |

Wynne Prakusya | 1–2 | Miho Saeki | 6–7, 7–5, 2–6
Angelique Widjaja | 2–0 | Saori Obata | 7–5, 6–4
Wynne Prakusya / Angelique Widjaja | 2–0 | Saori Obata / Miho Saeki | 6–4, 6–0

== Non-participating athletes ==
- Li Ting (CHN)
- Manisha Malhotra (IND)
- Shinobu Asagoe (JPN)
- Yuka Yoshida (JPN)
- Chan Chin-wei (TPE)
- Chuang Chia-jung (TPE)
