= Tennis at the 2002 Asian Games – Women's singles =

Women's singles at the 2002 Asian Games
- Venue: Geumjeong Tennis Stadium
- Dates: 7–11 October 2002
- Competitors: 20 from 10 nations

Medalists
gold medal	Iroda Tulyaganova	Uzbekistan
silver medal	Tamarine Tanasugarn	Thailand
bronze medal	Shinobu Asagoe	Japan
bronze medal	Cho Yoon-jeong	South Korea

Women's singles
- Tennis at the 2002 Asian Games

Events
Singles	men	women
Doubles	men	women	mixed
Team	men	women
Asian Games

The women's singles tennis event was part of the tennis programme and took place between October 7 and 11, at the Geumjeong Tennis Stadium.

== Schedule ==
All times are Korea Standard Time (UTC+09:00)

Date	Time	Event
Monday, 7 October 2002	10:00	1st round
Monday, 7 October 2002	10:00	2nd round
Tuesday, 8 October 2002	10:00	2nd round
Wednesday, 9 October 2002	10:00	Quarterfinals
Thursday, 10 October 2002	12:30	Semifinals
Friday, 11 October 2002	11:00	Final

== Results ==
=== Final ===
Final
1	Tamarine Tanasugarn (THA)	1	3
2	Iroda Tulyaganova (UZB)	6	6

=== Top half ===
1st round
Peng Shuai (CHN)	6	6
Ivanna Isroilova (UZB)	3	3
Natsagsürengiin Jigjidsüren (MGL)	0	0
Nirupama Vaidyanathan (IND)	6	6

2nd round
1	Tamarine Tanasugarn (THA)	6	6
Kunykei Koichumananova (KGZ)	1	1
Peng Shuai (CHN)	6	4	4
8	Jeon Mi-ra (KOR)	3	6	6
4	Angelique Widjaja (INA)	6	6
Hsieh Su-wei (TPE)	0	2
Nirupama Vaidyanathan (IND)	1	0
7	Shinobu Asagoe (JPN)	6	6

Quarterfinals
1	Tamarine Tanasugarn (THA)	7^{7}	6
8	Jeon Mi-ra (KOR)	6^{5}	4
4	Angelique Widjaja (INA)	5	3
7	Shinobu Asagoe (JPN)	7	6

Semifinals
1	Tamarine Tanasugarn (THA)	6	6
7	Shinobu Asagoe (JPN)	3	2

=== Bottom half ===
1st round
Yulia Klimchenko (KGZ)	1	0
Sania Mirza (IND)	6	6
Khishigtogtokhyn Khandsüren (MGL)	0	0
Wang I-ting (TPE)	6	6

2nd round
5	Saori Obata (JPN)	6	6
Sania Mirza (IND)	4	2
Zheng Jie (CHN)	2	1
3	Cho Yoon-jeong (KOR)	6	6
6	Wynne Prakusya (INA)	6	7^{7}
Wang I-ting (TPE)	4	6^{1}
Napaporn Tongsalee (THA)	1	3
2	Iroda Tulyaganova (UZB)	6	6

Quarterfinals
5	Saori Obata (JPN)	4	6	1
3	Cho Yoon-jeong (KOR)	6	4	6
6	Wynne Prakusya (INA)	2	3
2	Iroda Tulyaganova (UZB)	6	6

Semifinals
3	Cho Yoon-jeong (KOR)	6	3	2
2	Iroda Tulyaganova (UZB)	3	6	6
