= Tennis at the 2002 Asian Games – Women's doubles =

Women's doubles at the 2002 Asian Games
- Venue: Geumjeong Tennis Stadium
- Dates: 9–12 October 2002
- Competitors: 30 from 9 nations

Medalists
gold medal	Kim Mi-ok; Choi Young-ja	South Korea
silver medal	Wynne Prakusya; Angelique Widjaja	Indonesia
bronze medal	Saori Obata; Akiko Morigami	Japan
bronze medal	Yuka Yoshida; Miho Saeki	Japan

Women's doubles
- Tennis at the 2002 Asian Games

Events
Singles	men	women
Doubles	men	women	mixed
Team	men	women
Asian Games

The women's doubles tennis event was part of the tennis programme and took place between October 9 and 12, at the Geumjeong Tennis Stadium.

Chen Li and Li Fang from China were the defending champions, having won gold in Bangkok in 1998, but they didn't participate in Busan 2002. The Korean duo of Kim Mi-ok and Choi Young-ja won the gold in this tournament, with a three-set victory over Indonesia's Wynne Prakusya and Angelique Widjaja.

== Schedule ==
All times are Korea Standard Time (UTC+09:00)

Date	Time	Event
Wednesday, 9 October 2002	11:00	1st round
Thursday, 10 October 2002	11:00	Quarterfinals
Friday, 11 October 2002	13:00	Semifinals
Saturday, 12 October 2002	14:30	Final

== Results ==
1st round
Li Ting (CHN); Sun Tiantian (CHN)	6	3	6
Choi Jin-young (KOR); Jeon Mi-ra (KOR)	4	6	2
4	Chuang Chia-jung (TPE); Janet Lee (TPE)	6	6
Yulia Klimchenko (KGZ); Kunykei Koichumananova (KGZ)	0	0
Nirupama Vaidyanathan (IND); Manisha Malhotra (IND)	4	4
Saori Obata (JPN); Akiko Morigami (JPN)	6	6
Hsieh Su-wei (TPE); Chan Chin-wei (TPE)	6	6
Ankita Bhambri (IND); Rushmi Chakravarthi (IND)	0	3
Enkhjargalyn Khaliun (MGL); Natsagsürengiin Jigjidsüren (MGL)	0	0
3	Yuka Yoshida (JPN); Miho Saeki (JPN)	6	6
Kim Mi-ok (KOR); Choi Young-ja (KOR)	6	6
Prariyawan Ratanakrong (THA); Napaporn Tongsalee (THA)	2	0
Wukirasih Sawondari (INA); Liza Andriyani (INA)	4	4
2	Yan Zi (CHN); Zheng Jie (CHN)	6	6

Quarterfinals
1	Wynne Prakusya (INA); Angelique Widjaja (INA)	7	6
Li Ting (CHN); Sun Tiantian (CHN)	5	2
4	Chuang Chia-jung (TPE); Janet Lee (TPE)	6^{6}	2
Saori Obata (JPN); Akiko Morigami (JPN)	7^{8}	6
Hsieh Su-wei (TPE); Chan Chin-wei (TPE)	7	4	1
3	Yuka Yoshida (JPN); Miho Saeki (JPN)	5	6	6
Kim Mi-ok (KOR); Choi Young-ja (KOR)	6	6
2	Yan Zi (CHN); Zheng Jie (CHN)	3	4

Semifinals
1	Wynne Prakusya (INA); Angelique Widjaja (INA)	6	3	9
Saori Obata (JPN); Akiko Morigami (JPN)	3	6	7
3	Yuka Yoshida (JPN); Miho Saeki (JPN)	2	6	5
Kim Mi-ok (KOR); Choi Young-ja (KOR)	6	3	7

Final
1	Wynne Prakusya (INA); Angelique Widjaja (INA)	6^{4}	6	3
Kim Mi-ok (KOR); Choi Young-ja (KOR)	7^{7}	1	6
