= Martinho de Araújo =

East Timorese weightlifter (born 1973)

Personal information
- Full name: Martinho F. de Araújo
- Nationality: Timorese
- Born: 26 July 1973 (age 53) Dili, Portuguese Timor

Sport
- Sport: Weightlifting

Martinho F. de Araújo (born 26 July 1973) is a Timorese former weightlifter and sports official. Born in Dili, de Araújo worked as a schoolteacher and lifted weights before fleeing his home due to the 1999 East Timorese crisis. Upon his return, he had to make makeshift equipment to continue training. As Timor-Leste was under United Nations administration, he competed as part of the Individual Olympic Athletes and placed 20th in the men's bantamweight event. He later competed for an independent Timor-Leste at the 2002 Asian Games.

== Biography ==
Martinho F. de Araújo was born on 26 July 1973 in Dili, Portuguese Timor (now Timor-Leste). de Araújo lived in Dili and worked as a schoolteacher. He trained weightlifting with his own equipment but was then forced to flee his home in 1999 after East Timor's declaration of independence from Indonesia and the ensuing violence that followed. During the turmoil, it was reported that a gun was held up to his head. Upon returning home, he found that his house was burned down and his equipment rendered unusable.

To continue training, de Araújo had to improvise and made equipment out of scrap metal, pipes, metal bars, cog wheels of a truck's transmission, and paint cans filled with cement. Despite not knowing the weight of his homemade equipment, he continued to train. On 6 July 2000, he and ten other Timorese athletes traveled to Canberra, Australia, for a training and selection process for the 2000 Summer Olympics held in Sydney. Ultimately, he was selected to be one of four athletes to compete at the 2000 Summer Games. As the Olympic Charter requires a country to have an independent government and a National Olympic Committee, the athletes instead competed as Individual Olympic Athletes as Timor-Leste was under United Nations administration.

At the 2000 Summer Games, he competed in the men's bantamweight event for lifters that weighed 56 kilograms (123 lb) or less. He snatched 65 kilograms and clean and jerked 90 kilograms for a total of 157.5 kilograms. Overall, he placed 20th out of the 22 competitors after one was disqualified and one did not finish the competition. With his result, de Araújo was the first Timorese athlete to compete at an Olympic Games. After his competition, he commented how happy he was to participate and represent Timor-Leste. Two years later, he represented an independent Timor-Leste at the 2002 Asian Games held in Busan, South Korea. There, he placed 13th out of the 15 competitors in the men's bantamweight event after snatching 67.5 kilograms and clean and jerking 90 kilograms for a total of 157.5 kilograms.

In 2021, he was elected to the first athletes' commission of the National Olympic Committee of Timor Leste as the vice chairman.
