= Janet Lee =

Taiwanese-American tennis player (born 1976)

Janet Lee 李慧芝
- Country (sports): Chinese Taipei; United States
- Residence: Rancho Palos Verdes, California, U.S.
- Born: October 22, 1976 (age 49) Lafayette, Indiana, U.S.
- Height: 1.75 m (5 ft 9 in)
- Turned pro: January 5, 1995
- Retired: 2006
- Plays: Right-handed (double-handed backhand)
- Prize money: $943,370

Singles
- Career record: 278–274
- Career titles: 0 WTA, 2 ITF
- Highest ranking: No. 79 (April 6, 1998)

Grand Slam singles results
- Australian Open: 3R (1999)
- French Open: 1R (1997, 1998, 1999, 2002)
- Wimbledon: 2R (1998, 1999, 2001)
- US Open: 3R (2000)

Doubles
- Career record: 193–199
- Career titles: 3 WTA, 9 ITF
- Highest ranking: No. 20 (February 17, 2003)

Grand Slam doubles results
- Australian Open: 3R (2005)
- French Open: 2R (1998, 2001)
- Wimbledon: 3R (2002)
- US Open: QF (2004)

Team competitions
- Fed Cup: 29–8
Medal record
Representing Chinese Taipei
Women's Tennis
Asian Games
Gold medal – first place	1998 Bangkok	Women's Team
Gold medal – first place	2002 Busan	Mixed Doubles
Bronze medal – third place	2002 Busan	Women's Team
Universiade
Gold medal – first place	1999 Palma de Majorca	Women's Singles
Gold medal – first place	1999 Palma de Majorca	Women's Doubles
Silver medal – second place	2001 Beijing	Women's Singles
Bronze medal – third place	2001 Beijing	Women's Doubles

Janet Lee (Chinese: 李慧芝, born October 22, 1976) is a Taiwanese-American retired tennis player. She won three doubles titles during her professional career on the WTA Tour. She competed in all four Grand Slam tournaments in both singles and doubles. Her career-high singles ranking is 79, and her best doubles ranking world No. 20.

Since retiring, she has been an assistant coach for the California State University, Fullerton(CSUF) women's tennis team. She was a full-time undergraduate student at the university, majoring in Business with an emphasis in Accounting and Finance. After earning her B.A. at CSUF, she joined the professional services firm Deloitte & Touche, LLP.

== Personal ==
Her father is Shun-Yi Lee, a physicist, and her mother is Vanni Lee, a DP coordinator. Lee graduated from high school in 1994 and decided to postpone college to pursue a professional tennis career. She started playing tennis at age five.

== Career ==
Lee competed in tennis competitions for Chinese Taipei at the 2000 Summer Olympics in Sydney women's doubles with partner Weng Tzu-ting. They lost in the first round.

Playing doubles at the 2004 US Open with Peng Shuai, Lee reached the quarterfinals where they lost to Barbara Schett and Patty Schnyder, 2–6, 5–7.

Lee retired from professional tennis in 2006.

== WTA career finals ==
=== Doubles: 6 (3 titles, 3 runner-ups) ===
Legend
Tier I (0–0)
Tier II (1–0)
Tier III (1–3)
Tier IV & V (1–0)

Result	W-L	Date	Tournament	Surface	Partner	Opponents	Score
Loss	0–1	Feb 2001	Oklahoma City, U.S.	Hard (i)	(Indonesia) Wynne Prakusya	(South Africa) Amanda Coetzer (United States) Lori McNeil	3–6, 6–2, 0–6
Win	1–1	Jul 2001	Stanford Classic, U.S.	Hard	(Indonesia) Wynne Prakusya	(United States) Nicole Arendt (Netherlands) Caroline Vis	3–6, 6–3, 6–3
Loss	1–2	Sep 2001	Bali, Indonesia	Hard	(Indonesia) Wynne Prakusya	(Australia) Evie Dominikovic (Thailand) Tamarine Tanasugarn	7–6^{(7–4)}, 2–6, 3–6
Loss	1–3	Oct 2001	Japan Open	Hard	(Indonesia) Wynne Prakusya	(South Africa) Liezel Huber (Australia) Rachel McQuillan	2–6, 0–6
Win	2–3	Sep 2002	China Open	Hard	(Russia) Anna Kournikova	(Japan) Ai Sugiyama (Japan) Rika Fujiwara	7–5, 6–3
Win	3–3	Feb 2003	Doha Open, Qatar	Hard	(Indonesia) Wynne Prakusya	(Venezuela) María Vento-Kabchi (Indonesia) Angelique Widjaja	6–1, 6–3

== ITF Circuit finals ==
Legend
$100,000 tournaments
$75,000 tournaments
$50,000 tournaments
$25,000 tournaments
$10,000 tournaments

=== Singles (2–1) ===
Result	No.	Date	Tournament	Surface	Opponent	Score
Loss	1.	September 12, 1994	Vancouver, Canada	Hard	(Canada) Sonya Jeyaseelan	2–6, 4–6
Win	2.	July 21, 2001	Mahwah, United States	Hard	(Bulgaria) Svetlana Krivencheva	6–4, 7–6^{(5)}
Win	3.	June 2, 2002	Surbiton, United Kingdom	Grass	(United States) Laura Granville	4–6, 6–4, 6–4

=== Doubles (9–4) ===
Result	No.	Date	Tournament	Surface	Partner	Opponents	Score
Loss	1.	September 23, 1999	Santa Clara, United States	Hard	(United States) Laxmi Poruri	(United States) Meilen Tu (United Kingdom) Amanda Wainwright	5–7, 2–6
Loss	2.	February 10, 1997	Midland, United States	Hard (i)	(United States) Lindsay Lee-Waters	(United States) Angela Lettiere (Japan) Nana Smith	3–6, 2–6
Win	3.	March 9, 1997	Rockford, United States	Hard	(Sweden) Maria Strandlund	(Ukraine) Elena Brioukhovets (France) Noëlle van Lottum	7–6, 6–3
Win	4.	June 30, 1997	Queens, United States	Hard	(United States) Lindsay Lee-Waters	(United States) Keri Phebus (China) Fang Li	6–2, 2–6, 6–3
Win	5.	September 22, 1997	Newport Beach, United States	Hard	(United States) Ginger Helgeson-Nielsen	(United States) Amanda Augustus (Australia) Amy Jensen	6–3, 6–3
Loss	6.	April 16, 2000	La Cañada, United States	Hard	(Indonesia) Wynne Prakusya	(United States) Amanda Augustus (United States) Julie Scott	3–6, 1–6
Win	7.	July 9, 2000	Los Gatos, United States	Hard	(Canada) Vanessa Webb	(United States) Sandra Cacic (Canada) Renata Kolbovic	6–4, 6–1
Win	8.	July 31, 2000	Lexington, United States	Hard	(Indonesia) Wynne Prakusya	(United States) Sandra Cacic (Canada) Renata Kolbovic	6–2, 3–6, 6–2
Loss	9.	April 29, 2001	Sarasota, United States	Clay	(United States) Samantha Reeves	(United States) Melissa Middleton (India) Nirupama Sanjeev	4–6, 2–6
Win	10.	May 1, 2001	Dothan, United States	Clay	(United States) Marissa Irvin	(Russia) Alina Jidkova (Slovakia) Gabriela Voleková	6–0, 6–2
Win	11.	February 5, 2002	Midland, United States	Hard (i)	(Ukraine) Elena Tatarkova	(Bulgaria) Maria Geznenge (Czech Republic) Michaela Paštiková	6–1, 6–3
Win	12.	July 22, 2003	Lexington, United States	Hard	(United States) Jessica Lehnhoff	(Australia) Bryanne Stewart (Australia) Christina Wheeler	6–3, 6–4
Win	13.	November 4, 2003	Pittsburgh, United States	Hard	(United States) Amy Frazier	(Argentina) Gisela Dulko (United States) Meilen Tu	3–6, 6–1, 6–2
