= Vadim Kutsenko =

Uzbekistani tennis player

- Country (sports): Uzbekistan
- Residence: Tashkent, Uzbekistan
- Born: 16 March 1977 (age 48) Komsomolsk-on-Amur, Russian SFSR
- Height: 1.80 m (5 ft 11 in)
- Turned pro: 1994
- Plays: Right-handed
- Prize money: US$296,663

Singles
- Career record: 17–25
- Career titles: 0
- Highest ranking: No. 140 (June 17, 2002)

Grand Slam singles results
- Australian Open: 2R (2003)
- French Open: Q3 (2000, 2003)
- Wimbledon: Q1 (2003)
- US Open: Q2 (1999)

Doubles
- Career record: 10–14
- Career titles: 0
- Highest ranking: No. 132 (June 10, 2002)

Vadim Kutsenko
Medal record

Representing Uzbekistan

Men's Tennis

Asian Games
Bronze medal – third place	1998 Bangkok	Team
Bronze medal – third place	2002 Busan	Team

Vadim Kutsenko (born March 13, 1977) is a professional Uzbekistani tennis player.

Kutsenko reached his highest individual ranking on the ATP Tour on June 17, 2002, when he became World number 140. He primarily plays on the Futures circuit and the Challenger circuit.

Kutsenko's best performance at a Grand Slam event came at the 2003 Australian Open, where he reached the second round.

Kutsenko has been a member of the Uzbekistani Davis Cup team, posting a 14–17 record in singles and a 6–6 record in doubles in twenty-two ties played from 1995 to 2004.

Kutsenko represented Uzbekistan at the 1998 and 2002 Asian Games, winning the bronze medal in the Men's Team event in both games.

== ATP Challenger & ITF Futures ==
=== Titles (8) ===
Legend
ATP Challenger (4)
ITF Futures (4)

=== Singles ===
No.	Date	Tournament	Surface	Opponent	Score
1.	1 December 1997	Ahmedabad, India	Hard	(Austria) Herbert Wiltschnig	6–1, 6–4
2.	29 December 1997	India F1, India	Hard	(Uzbekistan) Dmitri Tomashevich	6–4, 6–4
3.	16 March 1998	Japan F1, Japan	Clay	(Japan) Gouichi Motomura	6–4, 6–3
4.	9 November 1998	India F4, India	Hard	(Uzbekistan) Oleg Ogorodov	6–3, 6–3
5.	28 June 1999	Indonesia F3, Indonesia	Clay	(South Africa) W.P. Meyer	6–2, 6–2
6.	26 July 1999	Istanbul, Turkey	Hard	(South Africa) Neville Godwin	6–4, 7–6^{(7–3)}
7.	21 February 2000	Ahmedabad, India	Hard	(United States) Oren Motevassel	6–2, 6–4
8.	7 August 2000	Tolyatti, Russia	Hard	(Russia) Igor Kunitsyn	6–4, 6–1
