= Angelique Widjaja =

Indonesian tennis player

Angelique Widjaja 黄依林
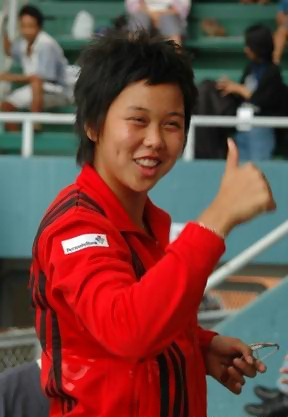
- Widjaja during Indonesia's 2004 Fed Cup tie against Slovenia in Jakarta
- Country (sports): Indonesia
- Born: 12 December 1984 (age 41) Bandung
- Height: 1.73 m (5 ft 8 in)
- Turned pro: 1999
- Retired: 2008
- Plays: Right (two-handed backhand)
- Prize money: $533,037

Singles
- Career record: 118–86
- Career titles: 2 WTA, 1 ITF
- Highest ranking: No. 55 (31 March 2003)

Grand Slam singles results
- Australian Open: 1R (2003, 2004)
- French Open: 2R (2002)
- Wimbledon: 2R (2002, 2003)
- US Open: 2R (2002)

Doubles
- Career record: 103–69
- Career titles: 2 WTA, 6 ITF
- Highest ranking: No. 15 (2 February 2004)

Grand Slam doubles results
- Australian Open: QF (2004)
- French Open: 3R (2002)
- Wimbledon: QF (2003, 2004)
- US Open: QF (2003)

Grand Slam mixed doubles results
- Australian Open: 2R (2004)
- French Open: QF (2004)
- Wimbledon: 1R (2004)
- US Open: 1R (2004)
Medal record
Women's Tennis
Representing Indonesia
Asian Games
Gold medal – first place	2002 Busan	Team
Silver medal – second place	2002 Busan	Doubles
SEA Games
Gold medal – first place	2001 Kuala Lumpur	Mixed doubles
Gold medal – first place	2001 Kuala Lumpur	Team
Silver medal – second place	2001 Kuala Lumpur	Doubles
Silver medal – second place	2007 Nakhon Ratchasima	Team

Angelique Widjaja (Chinese: 黄依林; pinyin: Huáng Yīlín; born 12 December 1984) is an Indonesian former professional tennis player. She won the junior championships at Wimbledon in 2001, defeating Dinara Safina, and the 2002 junior French Open defeating Ashley Harkleroad. She reached a peak of No. 55 in the WTA singles rankings in March 2003, and a peak of No. 15 in the doubles rankings in February 2004.

== Career ==
Widjaja started playing tennis at the age of four. She first began playing at ITF juniors events in 1998 at the age of 13. Her first professional event was an event in Jakarta in April 1999, when she was 14 years old.

She enjoyed considerable success as a junior player. In 2001, she won the singles competition of the junior championships at Wimbledon, defeating Dinara Safina 6–4, 0–6, 7–5. In doing so, she became the first Indonesian to win any title at Wimbledon. In 2002, she won the doubles competition of the Australian Open Junior Championships, partnered by Gisela Dulko. That year, she also won the singles competition of the junior championships at the French Open. She reached a peak junior rank of No. 2. Also, she obtained an invite from "Hong Kong Tennis Patrons' Association" to play The Hong Kong Ladies Challenge in January 2002.

The first WTA Tour tournament she won was the 2001 Wismilak International in Bali, a Tier III event, which she entered at the age of 16 on a wildcard. She was the youngest Indonesian ever to win a WTA singles title. Her WTA singles ranking prior to this tournament was No. 579, and as such was the lowest-ranked player ever to win a WTA singles title.

2002 was her most successful year in Grand Slam tournament singles competition, reaching the second round at three consecutive majors. At the French Open, she defeated Jill Craybas in the first round. She was beaten by Evie Dominikovic in the second round. At Wimbledon, she beat 15th seed Anna Smashnova in the first round, before losing to Meilen Tu in round two. At the US Open, she beat Anna Kournikova in the first round, and was eliminated in the next by Stéphanie Foretz.

Widjaja represented Indonesia at the 2002 Asian Games in Busan, collecting a silver medal in the women's doubles with partner Wynne Prakusya, and also the gold medal in the team event.

In November 2002, she won a second tour tournament, the Tier V event at Pattaya.

She continued to perform well on the WTA Tour through 2003. After her third-round exit from the Tier I tournament at Indian Wells in 2003, she reached her career's highest rank: No. 55. She remained in the top 100 for the remainder of 2003.

From 2003 to 2004, Widjaja enjoyed considerable success in doubles competition, primarily partnered by María Vento-Kabchi. The pair reached the quarterfinals at Wimbledon and the US Open in 2003, and the Australian Open and Wimbledon in 2004. They also won a Tier III event at Bali in 2003, and reached the final of one Tier I event, the 2003 Canada Masters. Following the 2004 Australian Open, Widjaja reached No. 15 in the WTA doubles rankings. This was her peak doubles rank.

Through 2004, Widjaja appeared in the mixed-doubles competition of all four majors. Her best result came at the French Open, where she and partner Lucas Arnold Ker beat Leander Paes and Martina Navratilova to reach the quarterfinals. There, they lost to the French pair Tatiana Golovin and Richard Gasquet.

Widjaja played at the 2004 Summer Olympics at Athens. She defeated Tamarine Tanasugarn in the first round of the singles competition, but was beaten by Karolina Šprem in the second round. She also took part in the doubles competition, partnered by Wynne Prakusya, and they were eliminated in the first round.

Through 2005, Widjaja took a hiatus from professional tennis due to various injuries. Following her return in 2006, she did not replicate her previous success, and did not take part in any singles competitions in WTA or ITF events after that year, but did remain active in doubles competition.

In 2007, she was part of the Indonesian women's team that won the silver medal at the SEA Games in Thailand.

In 2008, at the age of 23, Widjaja and partner Liza Andriyani won the doubles competition of an ITF tournament in Jakarta. This would be Widjaja's last tournament, as shortly afterwards she announced that she was quitting the professional tour, saying she was burnt out by the injuries and travel requirements.

During her professional career, Widjaja had recorded wins over several prominent players including Dinara Safina, Jelena Janković, Alicia Molik, Anna Smashnova, Anna Kournikova and Tamarine Tanasugarn. She was mainly coached by Meiske H. Wiguna and Deddy Tedjamukti.

Beside the pro tour, she was part of the Indonesia Fed Cup team in 2001, 2002, 2003, 2004 and 2006.

== Awards ==
- Achievement Award 2001 – the Asian Tennis Federation
- The Best Women Athlete of Indonesia 2001 – RCTI

== WTA Tour finals ==
=== Singles: 2 (2 titles) ===
Legend Tier I (0) Tier II (0) Tier III (1) Tier IV & V (1)	Finals by surface Hard (2–0)

Result	No.	Date	Tournament	Surface	Opponent	Score
Win	1.	30 September 2001	Wismilak International, Indonesia	Hard	(South Africa) Joannette Kruger	7–6^{(7–2)}, 7–6^{(7–4)}
Win	2.	10 November 2002	PTT Pattaya Open, Thailand	Hard	(South Korea) Cho Yoon-jeong	6–2, 6–4

=== Doubles: 6 (2 titles, 4 runner-ups) ===
Legend Tier I (1) Tier II (0) Tier III (4) Tier IV & V (1)	Finals by surface Hard (1–3) Clay (1–1)

Result	No.	Date	Tournament	Surface	Partner	Opponents	Score
Win	1.	29 April 2002	Bol Ladies Open, Croatia	Clay	(Italy) Tathiana Garbin	(Russia) Elena Bovina (Slovakia) Henrieta Nagyová	7–5, 3–6, 6–4
Loss	1.	10 February 2003	Qatar Ladies Open	Hard	(Venezuela) María Vento-Kabchi	(Indonesia) Wynne Prakusya (Chinese Taipei) Janet Lee	1–6, 3–6
Loss	2.	19 May 2003	Madrid Open, Spain	Clay	(Italy) Rita Grande	(South Africa) Liezel Huber (United States) Jill Craybas	4–6, 6–7^{(6–8)}
Loss	3.	11 August 2003	Rogers Cup, Canada	Hard	(Venezuela) María Vento-Kabchi	(United States) Martina Navratilova (Russia) Svetlana Kuznetsova	6–3, 1–6, 1–6
Win	2.	8 September 2003	Wismilak International, Indonesia	Hard	(Venezuela) María Vento-Kabchi	(Australia) Nicole Pratt (France) Émilie Loit	7–5, 6–2
Loss	4.	3 November 2003	PTT Pattaya Open, Thailand	Hard	(Indonesia) Wynne Prakusya	(China) Sun Tiantian (China) Li Ting	4–6, 3–6

== ITF Circuit finals ==
=== Singles: 2 (1 title, 1 runner-up) ===
Legend $75,000 tournaments $10,000 tournaments	Finals by surface Hard (1–1)

Result	No.	Date	Tournament	Surface	Opponent	Score
Loss	1.	12 August 2001	ITF Nonthaburi, Thailand	Hard	(Chinese Taipei) Hsieh Su-wei	6–7^{(4–7)}, 2–6
Win	2.	7 April 2002	Dubai Challenge, United Arab Emirates	Hard	(Japan) Shinobu Asagoe	7–6^{(7–4)}, 6–2

=== Doubles: 8 (6 titles, 2 runner-ups) ===
Legend $75,000 tournaments $25,000 tournaments $10,000 tournaments	Finals by surface Hard (6–1) Clay (0–1)

Result	No.	Date	Tournament	Surface	Partner	Opponents	Score
Win	1.	5 November 2000	ITF Jakarta, Indonesia	Hard	(Indonesia) Liza Andriyani	(South Korea) Kim Jin-hee (South Korea) Chae Kyung-yee	2–4, 5–3, 4–2, 0–4, 4–0
Win	2.	12 November 2000	ITF Bandung, Indonesia	Hard	(Indonesia) Liza Andriyani	(India) Rushmi Chakravarthi (India) Sai Jayalakshmy Jayaram	4–1, 4–2, 4–0
Win	3.	12 March 2001	ITF Kaohsiung, Taiwan	Hard	(Indonesia) Dea Sumantri	(South Korea) Kim Jin-hee (South Korea) Chae Kyung-yee	6–3, 6–2
Win	4.	13 August 2001	ITF Nonthaburi, Thailand	Hard	(Indonesia) Romana Tedjakusuma	(South Korea) Kim Jin-hee (South Korea) Chae Kyung-yee	4–6, 6–3, 7–5
Loss	1.	1 April 2002	Dubai Challenge, United Arab Emirates	Hard	(Morocco) Bahia Mouhtassine	(Netherlands) Seda Noorlander (Germany) Kirstin Freye	2–6, 4–6
Win	5.	7 November 2006	ITF Jakarta, Indonesia	Hard	(Indonesia) Romana Tedjakusuma	(South Korea) Kim Hea-mi (Japan) Keiko Taguchi	w/o
Loss	2.	12 November 2007	ITF Pune, India	Clay	(Indonesia) Wynne Prakusya	(Hong Kong) Zhang Ling (Thailand) Varatchaya Wongteanchai	6–1, 5–7, [5–10]
Win	6.	4 August 2008	ITF Jakarta, Indonesia	Hard	(Indonesia) Liza Andriyani	(South Korea) Kim Jin-hee (Chinese Taipei) Chen Yi	6–3, 6–1

== Junior Grand Slam finals ==
=== Singles: 2 (2 titles) ===
Result	Year	Tournament	Surface	Opponent	Score
Win	2001	Wimbledon	Grass	(Russia) Dinara Safina	6–4, 0–6, 7–5
Win	2002	French Open	Clay	(United States) Ashley Harkleroad	3–6, 6–1, 6–4

=== Doubles: 1 (title) ===
Result	Year	Tournament	Surface	Partner	Opponents	Score
Win	2002	Australian Open	Hard	(Argentina) Gisela Dulko	(Russia) Svetlana Kuznetsova (Croatia) Matea Mezak	6–2, 5–7, 6–4

== ITF Junior Circuit finals ==
=== Singles: 10 (8 titles, 2 runner-ups) ===
Legend Category GA Category G1 Category G2 Category G3 Category G4 Category G5	Finals by surface Hard (4–1) Clay (1–1) Grass (3–0)

Result	No.	Date	Tournament	Surface	Opponent	Score
Win	1.	March 2000	Indonesia International	Hard	(Indonesia) Dea Sumantri	4–6, 6–4, 6–2
Win	2.	April 2000	ITF Manila, Philippines	Hard	(Australia) Nicole Kriz	6–4, 6–4
Win	3.	March 2001	Singapore International	Hard	(Chinese Taipei) Hsieh Su-wei	6–4, 3–6, 6–1
Win	4.	April 2001	Thailand Open	Hard	(Chinese Taipei) Chuang Chia-jung	6–1, 6–3
Loss	1.	April 2001	ITF Manila, Philippines	Hard	(Chinese Taipei) Hsieh Su-wei	6–7^{(3–7)}, 6–4, 1–6
Win	5.	April 2001	Japan Open	Grass	(Chinese Taipei) Hsieh Su-wei	6–4, 6–7^{(4–7)}, 6–1
Loss	2.	June 2001	Astrid Bowl, Belgium	Clay	(United States) Ashley Harkleroad	0–6, 1–6
Win	6.	June 2001	LTA International, UK	Grass	(Australia) Samantha Stosur	6–4, 6–1
Win	7.	July 2001	Wimbledon, UK	Grass	(Russia) Dinara Safina	6–4, 0–6, 7–5
Win	8.	June 2002	French Open	Clay	(United States) Ashley Harkleroad	3–6, 6–1, 6–4

=== Doubles: 17 (12 titles, 5 runner-ups) ===
Legend Category GA Category G1 Category G2 Category G3 Category G4 Category G5	Finals by surface Hard (10–4) Grass (2–0) Carpet (0–1)

Result	No.	Date	Tournament	Surface	Partner	Opponents	Score
Win	1.	November 1998	Indonesia International	Hard	(Indonesia) Nuraeni Batubara	(South Africa) Nicole Rencken (South Africa) Natasha van der Merwe	w/o
Win	2.	November 1998	Malaysia International	Hard	(Indonesia) Nuraeni Batubara	(Australia) Samantha Stosur (Australia) Tiffany Welford	6–3, 6–0
Win	3.	March 1999	Indonesia International	Hard	(Indonesia) Nuraeni Batubara	(Japan) Kaori Aoyama (Japan) Kumiko Iijima	7–5, 6–2
Loss	1.	March 1999	Singapore International	Hard	(Australia) Samantha Stosur	(Norway) Caroline Tidemand (Sweden) Helena Ejeson	6–4, 1–6, 6–7
Win	4.	March 2000	Indonesia International	Hard	(Indonesia) Dea Sumantri	(Japan) Kumiko Iijima (Japan) Tomoko Yonemura	7–5, 6–4
Loss	2.	March 2000	Malaysia International	Hard	(Indonesia) Dea Sumantri	(Japan) Maki Arai (Japan) Masayo Hosokawa	6–7^{(5–7)}, 7–6^{(7–5)}, 2–6
Win	5.	March 2000	Singapore International	Hard	(Indonesia) Dea Sumantri	(Australia) Nicole Kriz (New Zealand) Tracey O'Connor	7–5, 3–6, 6–0
Loss	3.	April 2000	Thailand Open	Hard	(Chinese Taipei) Chuang Chia-jung	(Australia) Nicole Kriz (Hungary) Dorottya Magas	3–6, 3–6
Win	6.	April 2000	ITF Manila, Philippines	Hard	(Indonesia) Dea Sumantri	(United Kingdom) Elena Baltacha (United Kingdom) Jane O'Donoghue	6–1, 3–6, 6–3
Loss	4.	April 2000	Japan Open	Carpet	(Indonesia) Dea Sumantri	(Japan) Maki Arai (Japan) Kumiko Ijima	0–6, 1–6
Loss	5.	January 2001	Australian Hardcourt	Hard	(Indonesia) Dea Sumantri	(Chinese Taipei) Chan Chin-wei (Chinese Taipei) Chuang Chia-jung	6–7^{(5–7)}, 6–3, 0–6
Win	7.	April 2001	Thailand Open	Hard	(Chinese Taipei) Chuang Chia-jung	(Australia) Nicole Kriz (Hungary) Dorottya Magas	6–2, 6–1
Win	8.	April 2001	ITF Manila, Philippines	Hard	(Chinese Taipei) Hsieh Su-wei	(South Korea) Jung Yoo-mi (South Korea) Lim Sae-mi	6–2, 6–3
Win	9.	April 2001	Japan Open	Grass	(Chinese Taipei) Hsieh Su-wei	(Chinese Taipei) Chan Chin-wei (Chinese Taipei) Chang Hsin-chieh	6–4, 6–3
Win	10.	June 2001	LTA International, UK	Grass	(Mexico) Melissa Torres-Sandoval	(Australia) Christina Horiatopoulos (United States) Bethanie Mattek-Sands	6–3, 3–6, 6–3
Win	11.	September 2001	Canadian Open	Hard	(Haiti) Neyssa Etienne	(Chinese Taipei) Chuang Chia-jung (China) Shuai Peng	6–4, 6–1
Win	12.	January 2002	Australian Open	Hard	(Argentina) Gisela Dulko	(Russia) Svetlana Kuznetsova (Croatia) Matea Mezak	6–2, 5–7, 6–4

== National representation ==
=== Multi-sport event (Individual) ===
Widjaja made her debut in multi-sport events at the 2001 SEA Games, she won a mixed doubles gold medal and a women's doubles silver medal.

==== Doubles: 2 (2 silver medals) ====
Result	Date	Tournament	Surface	Partner	Opponents	Score
Silver	September 2001	SEA Games, Kuala Lumpur	Hard	(Indonesia) Romana Tedjakusuma	(Indonesia) Wynne Prakusya (Indonesia) Yayuk Basuki	2–6, 1–6
Silver	October 2002	Asian Games, Busan	Hard	(Indonesia) Wynne Prakusya	(South Korea) Kim Mi-ok (South Korea) Choi Young-ja	6–7^{(4–7)}, 6–1, 3–6

==== Mixed doubles: 1 (gold medal) ====
Result	Date	Tournament	Surface	Partner	Opponents	Score
Gold	September 2001	SEA Games, Kuala Lumpur	Hard	(Indonesia) Bonit Wiryawan	(Indonesia) Suwandi (Indonesia) Yayuk Basuki	w/o

== Performance timelines ==
Key
W	F	SF	QF	#R	RR	Q#	DNQ	A	NH

(W) winner; (F) finalist; (SF) semifinalist; (QF) quarterfinalist; (#R) rounds 4, 3, 2, 1; (RR) round-robin stage; (Q#) qualification round; (DNQ) did not qualify; (A) absent; (NH) not held; (SR) strike rate (events won / competed); (W–L) win–loss record.

=== Singles ===
Tournament	1999	2000	2001	2002	2003	2004	2005	2006	Career W–L
Grand Slam tournaments
Australian Open	A	A	A	LQ	1R	1R	A	A	0–2
French Open	A	A	A	2R	1R	LQ	A	A	1–2
Wimbledon	A	A	A	2R	2R	1R	A	A	2–3
US Open	A	A	A	2R	1R	1R	A	A	1–3
Grand Slam W–L	0–0	0–0	0–0	3–3	1–4	0–3	0–0	0–0	4–10
Olympic Games
Summer Olympics	Not Held	A	Not Held			2R	Not Held		1–1
Career statistics
Tournaments won^{1}	0	0	1	2	0	0	0	0	3
Overall win–loss^{1}	2–2	10–6	16–7	27–14	18–25	18–13	0–0	27–18	118–85^{2}
Win %	50%	62%	70%	66%	42%	58%	N/A	60%	58%
Year-end ranking	Unknown	709	148	69	95	135	N/A	228	N/A

- ^{1} Includes ITF tournaments.
- ^{2} The sum of wins/losses by year records from the WTA website does not add up to the career record presented on the same website.

=== Doubles ===
Tournament	1999	2000	2001	2002	2003	2004	2005	2006	2007	2008	Career W–L
Grand Slam tournaments
Australian Open	A	A	A	A	1R	QF	A	A	A	A	3–2
French Open	A	A	A	3R	2R	1R	A	A	A	A	3–3
Wimbledon	A	A	A	1R	QF	QF	A	A	A	A	6–3
US Open	A	A	A	1R	QF	1R	A	A	A	A	3–3
Grand Slam W–L	–	–	–	2–3	7–4	6–4	–	–	–	–	15–11
Olympic Games
Summer Olympics	Not Held	A	Not Held			1R	Not Held			A	0–1
Career statistics
Tournaments won^{1}	0	2	2	1	1	0	0	1	0	1	8
Overall win–loss^{1}	1–2	10–3	10–4	13–12	36–23	9–12	0–0	17–11	3–2	4–0	105–69 ^{2}
Win %	33%	70%	71%	52%	61%	43%	N/A	61%	60%	100%	60%
Year-end ranking	–	607	290	82	18	73	–	102	–	–	N/A

- ^{1} Includes ITF tournaments.
- ^{2} The sum of wins/losses by year records from the WTA website does not add up to the career record presented on the same website.

=== Mixed doubles ===
Tournament	2004	Career W–L
Australian Open	2R	1–1
French Open	QF	2–1
Wimbledon	1R	0–1
US Open	2R	0–1
Win–loss	3–4	3–4
