= Timor-Leste at the 2002 Asian Games =

- IOC code: TLS (TMP used at these Games)
- NOC: National Olympic Committee of East Timor

in Busan
- Competitors: 15
- Officials: 17
- Medals: Gold 0 Silver 0 Bronze 0 Total 0

Asian Games appearances (overview)
- 2002; 2006; 2010; 2014; 2018; 2022; 2026

East Timor (Timor-Leste) competed in the 2002 Asian Games held in Busan, South Korea, from September 29 to October 14, 2002. East Timor was the newest Asian country—it declared its independence four months before the Games on May 20, 2002—and participated in the Asian Games for the first time after the independence from Indonesia. Indonesia invaded the nation on December 7, 1975, and left on October 19, 1999 after the UN-supervised referendum.

East Timor sent a delegation of 15 competitors and 17 officials. The delegation included only one woman athlete, Mariana Diaz Ximenez, who participated in the marathon. The East Timorese delegation was one of the smallest among the participating nations and territories, only Laos had fewer athletes (13) than East Timor. East Timor was one of the five National Olympic Committees that won no medals at the Games.

== Delegation ==
The delegation of East Timor for the 2002 Asian Games consisted of 15 athletes and 17 officials. João Viegas Carrascalão accompanied the delegation as East Timor's Asian Games chef de mission.

East Timorese competitors in different sports
Sport	Total entries
Athletics	2
Boxing	2
Cycling	1
Karate	2
Table tennis	1
Taekwondo	1
Tennis	2
Weightlifting	1
Total	12

== Athletics ==
Women

The sole woman athlete to represent the nation was Mariana Diaz Ximenez, who participated in the marathon. Ximenez finished ninth of the 11 women participants, in this event in which two athletes did not finish the race. The personal best of Ximenez before the event was 2:34:08, but she achieved a time of 3:22:03.

Athlete	Events	Heat		Quarterfinal		Semifinal		Final	
Athlete	Events	Result	Rank	Result	Rank	Result	Rank	Result	Rank
Mariana Diaz Ximenez	Marathon	N/A						3:22:03	9

Men

Xavier do Rego participated for East Timor in the marathon and finished 14th out of 15 athletes, with one athlete not finishing the race.

Athlete	Events	Heat		Quarterfinal		Semifinal		Final	
Athlete	Events	Result	Rank	Result	Rank	Result	Rank	Result	Rank
Xavier do Rego	Marathon	N/A						2:41:36	14

== Boxing ==
East Timor's boxing squad for the Games included two boxers Felix Barreto and Victor Ramos, competing in the flyweight and lightweight classes respectively. Both failed to earn a single point in their respective bouts, and were eliminated in the first round of the event.

Athlete	Event	Round of 32	Round of 16	Quarterfinals	Semifinals	Final	
Athlete	Event	Opposition Result	Opposition Result	Opposition Result	Opposition Result	Opposition Result	Rank
Felix Barreto	Flyweight	Jongjohor (THA); L 0–16	Did not advance				
Victor Ramos	Lightweight	Jong-Sub (KOR); L RSCO^{[a]}	Did not advance				

== Cycling ==
Jorge Pereira was the only cyclist from the East Timor to compete. He participated in the four different cycling events– road race, individual time trial, 1 km time trial and individual pursuit. Individual time trial (48.4 km) was the only event in which Pereira completed the race, with a 15th position.

=== Road ===
Athlete	Event	Time	Rank
Jorge Pereira	Road race	DNF^{[b]}	—
Jorge Pereira	Individual time trial	1:37:40.11	15

=== Track ===
Athlete	Event	Time	Rank
Jorge Pereira	1 km time trial	DNS^{[c]}	—

Sprints

Athlete	Event	Qualifying		1st round		Finals	
Athlete	Event	Time	Rank	Opposition Time	Rank	Opposition Time	Rank
Jorge Pereira	Individual pursuit	DNS					—

== Karate ==
East Timor entered two karateka—Antonio de Araújo and Filomeno Soares—into the karate competition in Busan. De Araújo got a bye in the 1st preliminary round and lost to Hussain Al-Qattan of Kuwait in the quarterfinals, without gaining a single point. Soares eliminated in the first round after losing to Farman Ahmed of Pakistan.

Athlete	Event	1st preliminary round	Quarterfinals	Semifinals	Final	
Athlete	Event	Opposition Result	Opposition Result	Opposition Result	Opposition Result	Rank
Antonio de Araújo	Individual kata	Bye	Hussain Al-Qattan (KUW); L 0–7	Did not advance		
Filomeno Soares	Kumite −60 kg	Farman Ahmed (PAK); L 0–3	Did not advance			

== Table tennis ==
Antonio Sales was the sole representative of East Timor in table tennis. Sales lost to Ko Lai Chak in round 32 without winning a single game.

Athlete	Event	Round of 32	Round of 16	Quarterfinals	Semifinals	Finals	
Athlete	Event	Opposition Result	Opposition Result	Opposition Result	Opposition Result	Opposition Result	Rank
Antonio Sales	Men's singles	Chak (HKG); L 0-4 (2–11, 4–11, 1–11, 2–11)	Did not advance				

== Taekwondo ==
Gil Fernandes competed for East Timor in the −67 kg weight class. He got bye in the first round and lost the pre-quarterfinal match to Pavel Yugay of Uzbekistan after the referee stopped the contest (RSC).

Athlete	Event	Round of 32	Round of 16	Quarterfinals	Semifinals	Finals	
Athlete	Event	Opposition Result	Opposition Result	Opposition Result	Opposition Result	Opposition Result	Rank
Gil Fernandes	−67 kg	Bye	Pavel Yugay (UZB); L RSC	Did not advance			

== Tennis ==
Two competitors—Antonio Mendes and Matias de Souza—competed for the East Timor in two tennis events in the Geumjeong Tennis Stadium. Mendes lost his first match to Sergei Makashin of Tajikistan, while De Souza reached the second round but lost to Rohan Bopanna of India.

Athlete	Event	Round of 64	Round of 32	Round of 16	Quarterfinals	Semifinals	Finals	
Athlete	Event	Opposition Result	Opposition Result	Opposition Result	Opposition Result	Opposition Result	Opposition Result	Rank
Antonio Mendes	Singles	Sergei Makashin (TJK); L 0–6, 2–6	Did not advance					
Matias de Souza	Singles	Sukhbaataryn Sukhjargal (MGL); W 6–1, 6–1	Rohan Bopanna (IND); L 2–6, 0–6	Did not advance				
Antonio Mendes, Matias de Souza	Doubles	N/A	(Hong Kong) Brian Hung, John Hui (HKG); L 0–6, 0–6	Did not advance				

== Weightlifting ==
Martinho de Araújo was the sole competitor for East Timor in weightlifting, competing in the bantamweight class. De Araújo was the first East Timorese at the Olympics, he represented East Timor in the 2000 Summer Olympics in Sydney in the same weight class. In the 2002 Asian Games, his highest successfully lifted weight in snatch was 67.5 kg, out of 65 and 67.5 kg, and in clean and jerk his best was 90 kg, he also tried two failed attempts for 95 and 100 kg. De Araújo finished in 13th place in the final standings with a total of 157.5 kg, least among all the ranked weightlifters.

Athlete	Event	Body weight (kg)	Snatch (kg)				Clean & jerk (kg)				Total	Rank
Athlete	Event	Body weight (kg)	1	2	3	Result	1	2	3	Result	Total	Rank
Martinho de Araújo	Men's -56 kg	55.20	~~65.0~~	~~67.5~~	67.5	67.5	90.0	~~95.0~~	~~100.0~~	90.0	157.5	13

== See also ==
- Timor-Leste at the Asian Games

== Notes and references ==
Notes

- ^{a} RSCO refers to Referee Stopped Contest – Outclassed Opponent. Referee stops the boxing bout if a boxer is seriously injured, if one boxer is significantly dominating the other or if the score is severely imbalanced.
- ^{b} Did not finish.
- ^{c} Did not start.
