= Chung Hee-seok =

South Korean tennis player

Hee-seok Chung
- Country (sports): South Korea
- Residence: Seoul, South Korea
- Born: 29 January 1977 (age 48)
- Plays: Right-handed
- Prize money: US$34,345

Singles
- Career record: 6–3
- Career titles: 0
- Highest ranking: No. 482 (May 27, 2002)

Doubles
- Career record: 6–5
- Career titles: 0
- Highest ranking: No. 477 (November 20, 2006)

Chung Hee-seok
Medal record

Tennis

Representing South Korea

Asian Games
Gold medal – first place	2006 Doha	Team Event
Silver medal – second place	2002 Busan	Men's Doubles
Silver medal – second place	2002 Busan	Team Event

Chung Hee-seok (born January 29, 1977) is a former professional South Korean tennis player.

Chung reached his highest individual ranking on the ATP Tour on May 27, 2002, when he became World number 482. He played primarily on the Futures circuit and the Challenger circuit.

Chung was a member of the South Korean Davis Cup team, posting a 7–3 record in singles and a 7–5 record in doubles in thirteen ties played.

== Career finals ==
=== Singles – all levels (6–3) ===
Legend (singles)
Grand Slam (0–0)
Tennis Masters Cup (0–0)
ATP Masters Series (0–0)
ATP Tour (0–0)
Challengers (0–0)
Futures (6–3)

Outcome	No.	Date	Tournament	Surface	Opponent	Score
Winner	1.	29 May 2000	Seoul, South Korea	Hard	(South Korea) Lee Seung-hoon	6–3, 6–3
Runner-up	1.	28 May 2001	Seoul, South Korea	Clay	(South Korea) Lee Seung-hoon	4–6, 4–6
Winner	2.	4 June 2001	Seoul, South Korea	Clay	(South Korea) Kim Dong-hyun	6–4, 7–6
Winner	3.	13 May 2002	Seoul, South Korea	Clay	(South Korea) Kim Dong-hyun	6–4, 6–3
Runner-up	2.	28 April 2003	Seoul, South Korea	Clay	(Czech Republic) Jan Masik	7–6, 3–6, 1–6
Winner	4.	9 August 2004	Makassar, Indonesia	Hard	(Indonesia) Suwandi Suwandi	7–6, 6–3
Runner-up	3.	8 August 2005	Makassar, Indonesia	Hard	(South Korea) Kwon Oh-hee	6–7, 1–6
Winner	5.	7 August 2006	Bangkok, Thailand	Hard	(Chinese Taipei) Chen Ti	6–4, 6–0
Winner	6.	14 August 2006	Nonthaburi, Thailand	Hard	(Australia) Nick Lindahl	6–1, 6–1
