= Xu Ran =

Chinese tennis player

- Country (sports): China
- Born: 10 October 1980 (age 45)
- Prize money: $8,383

Singles
- Highest ranking: No. 792 (6 May 2002)

Doubles
- Career record: 0–2 (ATP Tour)
- Highest ranking: No. 400 (10 March 2003)

Xu Ran (born 10 October 1980) is a Chinese former professional tennis player.

Xu played Davis Cup for China as a doubles specialist, featuring in 11 ties between 2000 and 2004, from which he won a total of five rubbers. He also represented his country at the 2002 Asian Games and reached the quarter-finals of both the men's doubles and mixed doubles.

On the ATP Tour, Xu made two main draw appearances at the Shanghai Open, in 2000 and 2001.
