= Peter Handoyo =

Indonesian tennis player

- Country (sports): Indonesia
- Born: 12 August 1979 (age 46) Surabaya, Indonesia
- Plays: Right-handed
- Prize money: $15,420

Singles
- Career record: 4–3 (Davis Cup)
- Highest ranking: No. 520 (7 October 2002)

Doubles
- Career record: 2–0 (Davis Cup)
- Highest ranking: No. 351 (14 July 2003)
Medal record
Representing Indonesia
Asian Games
Bronze medal – third place	2002 Busan	Men's team
SEA Games
Gold medal – first place	2001 Kuala Lumpur	Men's team
Bronze medal – third place	2001 Kuala Lumpur	Men's singles

Peter Handoyo (born 12 August 1979) is an Indonesian former professional tennis player.

A Surabaya-born player, Handoyo trained in Hilton Head, South Carolina and attained high rankings in junior tennis. He was the 1997 USTA Junior Grass Court singles champion and a finalist at the 1997 Eddie Herr International Championships.

Handoyo played college tennis for the University of Tennessee, where he was a three-time All-American. The ITA Rookie of the Year in 1999, he amassed 145 career singles wins and won the 2002 SEC Indoor Championships. By also claiming an SEC doubles championship in 2002 he became the first player in the open era to win both in the same season.

Between 2001 and 2003 he was a member of Indonesia's Davis Cup team, winning four singles and two doubles rubbers. He won two medals, including a gold, for Indonesia at the 2001 Southeast Asian Games in Kuala Lumpur and earned a further bronze medal at the 2002 Asian Games in Busan.

== ATP Challengers and ITF Futures finals ==
=== Doubles ===
Legend ATP Challenger Tour (–) ITF Futures Tour/World Tennis Tour (–)	Finals by surface Hard (–) Clay (–) Grass (–0) Carpet (0–)

Result	W–L	Date	Tournament	Tier	Surface	Partner	Opponents	Score	Ref
Win		Nov 2001	Thailand F1 Futures, Pattaya	Futures	Hard	(South Africa) Raven Klaasen	(Chinese Taipei) Lu Yen-Hsun (Germany) Frank Moser	6–3, 6–4	
Win		Jul 2002	Jamaica F10 Futures, Montego Bay	Futures	Hard	(Japan) Hiroki Kondo	(Canada) Erik Dmytruk (Puerto Rico) Gabriel Montilla	6–1, 6–2	
Win		Sep 2002	Japan F6 Futures, Kashiwa	Futures	Hard	(Indonesia) Suwandi	(Chinese Taipei) Lu Yen-Hsun (Japan) Toshihide Matsui	6–3, 6–2	
Win		Jan 2003	India F1 Futures, Lucknow	Futures	Grass	(Indonesia) Suwandi	(Japan) Satoshi Iwabuchi (South Korea) Kim Dong-hyun	6–4, 6–2	
Win		Jun 2003	Germany F7 Futures, Kassel	Futures	Hard	(Indonesia) Suwandi	(Argentina) Patricio Arquez (Argentina) Francisco Cabello	6–7, 6–4, 6–4	

== ITF Junior Circuit finals ==
=== Doubles ===
Legend Category GA (1–0) Category G1 (0-0) Category G2 (0–0) Category G3 (0–0) Category G4 (0–0) Category G5 (0–0)	Finals by surface Hard (0–9) Clay (0–0) Grass (0–0) Carpet (0–0)

Result	W–L	Date	Tournament	Tier	Surface	Partner	Opponents	Score
Win		Aug 1996	USTA Junior International Grass Court Championships	G3	Grass	(Canada) Erik Dmytruk	(United States) Joseph Gilbert (United States) Michael Lang	6–4, 6–3
Loss		Mar 1997	Singapore International Junior Championships	G3	Hard	(Slovenia) Tomasz Berendijas	(Indonesia) Hendri-Susilo Pramono (Indonesia) Febi Widhiyanto	1–6, 4–6
Loss		Aug 1997	USTA International Junior Grass Court Championships	G3	Grass	(India) Manoj Mahadevan	(United States) Chase Exon (United States) Robert Kendrick	2–6, 3–6
Win		Aug 1997	USTA International Junior Hardcourt Championships	G3	Hard	(Egypt) Marwan Zewar	(United States) Jerry Joseph (United States) Lesley Joseph	6–4, 6–4
Loss		Aug 1997	Canadian Junior International	G1	Hard	(Egypt) Marwan Zewar	(Monaco) Jean-Rene Lisnard (France) Michael Llodra	3–6, 3–6
Win		Oct 1997	World Super Junior Championships, Japan	GA	Hard	(Egypt) Marwan Zewar	(United Kingdom) Simon Dickson (United Kingdom) David Sherwood	6–3, 7–6

== See also ==
- List of Indonesia Davis Cup team representatives
