= Oleg Ogorodov =

Uzbekistani tennis player (born 1972)

- Country (sports): Uzbekistan
- Born: 16 July 1972 (age 53) Tashkent, Uzbekistan, Soviet Union
- Height: 1.93 m (6 ft 4 in)
- Plays: Right-handed
- Prize money: $602,095

Singles
- Career record: 41–60
- Career titles: 0
- Highest ranking: No. 101 (13 May 1996)

Grand Slam singles results
- Australian Open: 1R (1996)
- French Open: 2R (2002)
- Wimbledon: 1R (1996)
- US Open: 1R (1997)

Doubles
- Career record: 25–24
- Career titles: 1
- Highest ranking: No. 102 (7 July 1997)
Medal record
Tennis
Asian Games
Bronze medal – third place	1998 Bangkok	Team Event
Bronze medal – third place	2002 Busan	Singles
Bronze medal – third place	2002 Busan	Team Event
Bronze medal – third place	2002 Busan	Mixed Doubles

Oleg Ogorodov (Олег Огородов; born 16 July 1972) is a former tennis player, who turned professional in 1995. He represented Uzbekistan at the 1996 Summer Olympics in Atlanta, Georgia. His career high singles rank came on May 13, 1996, when he was ranked 101st in men's singles tennis rankings. Alternatively in doubles his career high came a year later on July 7, 1997, when he ranked 102nd.

== Career ==
Ogorodov officially turned pro in 1995 and made his first singles appearance on the Association of Tennis Professionals (ATP) challenger series tour in July. During his first appearance in Weiden, Germany he made it to the quarterfinal but lost to Swedish tennis player Thomas Johansson in three sets, 7–6, 1–6, 5–7. He would make it to his first challenger semifinal the following week in Eisenach, Germany when lost to Polish tennis player Wojtek Kowalski in straight sets, 6–7, 3–6. In July 1995 Ogorodov made his first ATP tour appearance in Prague, Czech Republic however he lost in the first round to Simon Touzil, 4–6, 4–6. October 1995 he made into his first ATP tour quarterfinal in Vienna, Austria losing against Belgian player Filip Dewulf, 3–6, 1–6, Dewulf later on to win the tournament against Thomas Muster. During his play in Vienna he gained one of his biggest victories to date by beating Ukrainian player and number 4 seed Andriy Medvedev who was ranked 16th in the world at the time in straight sets, 6–3, 6–1.

== Career finals ==
=== Doubles (1 title) ===
Result	W/L	Date	Tournament	Surface	Partner	Opponents	Score
Win	1–0	Sep 1999	Tashkent, Uzbekistan	Hard	(Switzerland) Marc Rosset	(United States) Mark Keil (Switzerland) Lorenzo Manta	7–6^{(7–4)}, 7–6^{(7–1)}
