= Kwon Oh-hee =

South Korean tennis player

Kwon Oh-hee 권오희
- Country (sports): South Korea
- Born: 18 June 1978 (age 48)
- Plays: Right-handed
- Prize money: $92,076

Singles
- Career record: 1–0 (at ATP Tour level, Grand Slam level, and in Davis Cup)
- Career titles: 11 ITF
- Highest ranking: No. 288 (12 June 2006)

Grand Slam singles results
- Wimbledon: Q1 (2006)

Doubles
- Career record: 2–1 (at ATP Tour level, Grand Slam level, and in Davis Cup)
- Career titles: 14 ITF
- Highest ranking: No. 452 (26 May 2008)

Team competitions
- Davis Cup: 3–1

- Kwon Oh-hee
- Hangul: 권오희
- RR: Gwon Ohui
- MR: Kwŏn Ohŭi

Kwon Oh-hee (born 18 June 1978) is a South Korean tennis player.

Kwon has a career high ATP singles ranking of No. 288 achieved on 12 June 2006 and a career high ATP doubles ranking of No. 452 achieved on 26 May 2008. Kwon has won eleven ITF singles titles and fourteen ITF doubles titles.

Kwon has represented South Korea at the Davis Cup, where he has a win–loss record of 3–1.
