= Dmitri Tomashevich =

Uzbekistani tennis player (born 1974)

Dmitriy Tomashevich
- Country (sports): Uzbekistan
- Born: 6 March 1974 (age 51) Tashkent, Uzbekistan
- Plays: Right-handed
- Prize money: US$100,223

Singles
- Career record: 2–10
- Career titles: 0
- Highest ranking: No. 261 (6 May 1996)

Doubles
- Career record: 8–10
- Career titles: 0
- Highest ranking: No. 212 (10 July 2000)
- Last updated on: 25 October 2018.

Dmitri Tomashevich (Дмитрий Томашевич; born 6 March 1974) is a former tennis player from Uzbekistan, who represented his native country at the 1996 Summer Olympics in Atlanta, Georgia, where he was defeated in the first round by Slovakia's Karol Kučera. The right-hander reached his highest singles ATP-ranking on June 5, 1996, when he became the number 261 of the world. He has been the Uzbekistan Fed Cup coach for Uzbekistan since 2013. He led the Fed Cup team with relatively decent records including 2–0 against Hong Kong Fed Cup 1–0 against Japan Fed Cup, 2–1 against Chinese Taipei, 2–2 against Korea Fed Cup, and 1–1 against Thailand Fed Cup.
