= Kim Dong-hyun (tennis) =

South Korean tennis player

- Full name: Kim Dong-hyun
- Country (sports): South Korea
- Born: 8 October 1978 (age 47)
- Prize money: $43,612

Singles
- Highest ranking: No. 327 (10 June 2002)

Doubles
- Career record: 2–1
- Highest ranking: No. 337 (15 June 1998)

Kim Dong-hyun (born 8 October 1978) is a former professional tennis player from South Korea.

== Biography ==
Kim made his only ATP Tour main draw appearance in the doubles at the 1996 Korea Open, where he partnered with Lee Jong-min to make the semi-finals as wildcards.

In 1997 he began playing for the South Korea Davis Cup team and went on to feature in a total of 10 ties.

During his career he represented South Korea at the Asian Games and Summer Universiade. He was a member of the gold medal winning Korean team at the 1998 Asian Games and won a mixed doubles gold medal at 1999 Summer Universiade.

== See also ==
- List of South Korea Davis Cup team representatives
