= Tennis at the 1998 Asian Games – Men's doubles =

Men's doubles at the 1998 Asian Games
- Venue: Muang Thong Thani Tennis Centre
- Dates: 13–17 December 1998
- Competitors: 40 from 13 nations

Medalists
gold medal	Paradorn Srichaphan; Narathorn Srichaphan	Thailand
silver medal	Lee Hyung-taik; Yoon Yong-il	South Korea
bronze medal	Michihisa Onoda; Takahiro Terachi	Japan
bronze medal	Chen Chih-jung; Lin Bing-chao	Chinese Taipei

Men's doubles
- Tennis at the 1998 Asian Games

Events
Singles	men	women
Doubles	men	women	mixed
Team	men	women
- Asian Games

The men's doubles tennis event was part of the tennis programme and took place between December 13 and 17, at Muang Thong Thani Tennis Centre.

== Schedule ==
All times are Indochina Time (UTC+07:00)

Date	Time	Event
Sunday, 13 December 1998	10:00	1st round
Monday, 14 December 1998	10:00	2nd round
Tuesday, 15 December 1998	10:00	Quarterfinals
Wednesday, 16 December 1998	10:00	Semifinals
Thursday, 17 December 1998	10:00	Final

== Results ==
Legend

- r — Retired
- WO — Won by walkover

=== Final ===
Final
4	Lee Hyung-taik (KOR); Yoon Yong-il (KOR)	3	6^{5}
3	Paradorn Srichaphan (THA); Narathorn Srichaphan (THA)	6	7^{7}

=== Top half ===
1st round
Muhammad Khaliq (PAK); Aisam-ul-Haq Qureshi (PAK)	6	6^{3}	6
Vittaya Samrej (THA); Danai Udomchoke (THA)	4	7^{7}	8
Liu Cheng-yung (TPE); Wang Chih-Ping (TPE)	2	2
Bonit Wiryawan (INA); Sulistyo Wibowo (INA)	6	6

2nd round
1	Oleg Ogorodov (UZB); Dmitri Tomashevich (UZB)	6	7^{7}
Vittaya Samrej (THA); Danai Udomchoke (THA)	2	6^{3}
Joseph Lizardo (PHI); Michael John Misa (PHI)	4	0
Michihisa Onoda (JPN); Takahiro Terachi (JPN)	6	6
4	Lee Hyung-taik (KOR); Yoon Yong-il (KOR)	6	4	6
Li Si (CHN); Zheng Yu (CHN)	3	6	4
Bonit Wiryawan (INA); Sulistyo Wibowo (INA)	6^{2}	6	4
Mahesh Bhupathi (IND); Syed Fazaluddin (IND)	7^{7}	4	6

Quarterfinals
1	Oleg Ogorodov (UZB); Dmitri Tomashevich (UZB)	6^{3}	5
Michihisa Onoda (JPN); Takahiro Terachi (JPN)	7^{7}	7
4	Lee Hyung-taik (KOR); Yoon Yong-il (KOR)	7	6
Mahesh Bhupathi (IND); Syed Fazaluddin (IND)	5	4

Semifinals
Michihisa Onoda (JPN); Takahiro Terachi (JPN)	5	1
4	Lee Hyung-taik (KOR); Yoon Yong-il (KOR)	7	6

=== Bottom half ===
1st round
Melvin Tong (HKG); Wayne Wong (HKG)	3	4
Zhu Benqiang (CHN); Zhang Yu (CHN)	6	6
Ali Hamadeh (LIB); Sean Karam (LIB)
Aqeel Khan (PAK); Nasir Munir Ahmed (PAK)	W	O

2nd round
Kim Dong-hyun (KOR); Han Min-kyu (KOR)	6	6
Mohammad Ghareeb (KUW); Adel Al-Shatti (KUW)	2	1
Zhu Benqiang (CHN); Zhang Yu (CHN)	2	4
3	Paradorn Srichaphan (THA); Narathorn Srichaphan (THA)	6	6
Nitin Kirtane (IND); Vijay Kannan (IND)	6	6
Ramin Raziani (IRI); Akbar Taheri (IRI)	4	2
Aqeel Khan (PAK); Nasir Munir Ahmed (PAK)	0	0^{r}
2	Chen Chih-jung (TPE); Lin Bing-chao (TPE)	6	1

Quarterfinals
Kim Dong-hyun (KOR); Han Min-kyu (KOR)	4	6	4
3	Paradorn Srichaphan (THA); Narathorn Srichaphan (THA)	6	3	6
Nitin Kirtane (IND); Vijay Kannan (IND)	4	5
2	Chen Chih-jung (TPE); Lin Bing-chao (TPE)	6	7

Semifinals
3	Paradorn Srichaphan (THA); Narathorn Srichaphan (THA)	7^{7}	6
2	Chen Chih-jung (TPE); Lin Bing-chao (TPE)	6^{5}	4
