= Tennis at the 1998 Asian Games – Mixed doubles =

Mixed doubles at the 1998 Asian Games
- Venue: Muang Thong Thani Tennis Centre
- Dates: 13–17 December 1998
- Competitors: 38 from 11 nations

Medalists
gold medal	Satoshi Iwabuchi; Nana Miyagi	Japan
silver medal	Kim Dong-hyun; Choi Ju-yeon	South Korea
bronze medal	Mahesh Bhupathi; Nirupama Vaidyanathan	India
bronze medal	Li Si; Li Fang	China

Mixed doubles
- Tennis at the 1998 Asian Games

Events
Singles	men	women
Doubles	men	women	mixed
Team	men	women
Asian Games

The mixed doubles tennis event was part of the tennis programme and took place between December 13 and 17, at Muang Thong Thani Tennis Centre.

== Schedule ==
All times are Indochina Time (UTC+07:00)

Date	Time	Event
Sunday, 13 December 1998	10:00	1st round
Sunday, 13 December 1998	10:00	2nd round
Monday, 14 December 1998	10:00	2nd round
Tuesday, 15 December 1998	10:00	Quarterfinals
Wednesday, 16 December 1998	10:00	Semifinals
Thursday, 17 December 1998	10:00	Final

== Results ==
=== Final ===
Final
	Kim Dong-hyun (KOR); Choi Ju-yeon (KOR)	5	5
2	Satoshi Iwabuchi (JPN); Nana Miyagi (JPN)	7	7

=== Top half ===
1st round
Michael John Misa (PHI); Maricris Fernandez (PHI)	3	6	6
Dmitri Tomashevich (UZB); Lilia Biktyakova (UZB)	6	4	4

2nd round
1	Mahesh Bhupathi (IND); Nirupama Vaidyanathan (IND)	6	6
Michael John Misa (PHI); Maricris Fernandez (PHI)	3	4
Bonit Wiryawan (INA); Liza Andriyani (INA)	6	1	3
Takahiro Terachi (JPN); Rika Hiraki (JPN)	1	6	6
3	Chen Chih-jung (TPE); Wang Shi-ting (TPE)	6^{2}	7^{8}	3
Kim Dong-hyun (KOR); Choi Ju-yeon (KOR)	7^{7}	6^{6}	6
Zhang Yu (CHN); Li Li (CHN)	7	6
Narathorn Srichaphan (THA); Benjamas Sangaram (THA)	5	1

Quarterfinals
1	Mahesh Bhupathi (IND); Nirupama Vaidyanathan (IND)	6	7^{7}
Takahiro Terachi (JPN); Rika Hiraki (JPN)	4	6^{3}
Kim Dong-hyun (KOR); Choi Ju-yeon (KOR)	6	6
Zhang Yu (CHN); Li Li (CHN)	4	4

Semifinals
1	Mahesh Bhupathi (IND); Nirupama Vaidyanathan (IND)	4	3
Kim Dong-hyun (KOR); Choi Ju-yeon (KOR)	6	6

=== Bottom half ===
1st round
Syed Fazaluddin (IND); Manisha Malhotra (IND)	6	6
Aqeel Khan (PAK); Nida Waseem (PAK)	4	2
Vittaya Samrej (THA); Suvimol Duangchan (THA)	6	6
Melvin Tong (HKG); Tong Ka Po (HKG)	4	4

2nd round
Lin Bing-chao (TPE); Janet Lee (TPE)	1	3
Li Si (CHN); Li Fang (CHN)	6	6
Syed Fazaluddin (IND); Manisha Malhotra (IND)	2	3
4	Lee Hyung-taik (KOR); Park Sung-hee (KOR)	6	6
Vadim Kutsenko (UZB); Iroda Tulyaganova (UZB)	7	6
Sulistyo Wibowo (INA); Yayuk Basuki (INA)	5	4
Vittaya Samrej (THA); Suvimol Duangchan (THA)	5	4
2	Satoshi Iwabuchi (JPN); Nana Miyagi (JPN)	7	6

Quarterfinals
Li Si (CHN); Li Fang (CHN)	7^{7}	6
4	Lee Hyung-taik (KOR); Park Sung-hee (KOR)	6^{5}	1
Vadim Kutsenko (UZB); Iroda Tulyaganova (UZB)	1	5
2	Satoshi Iwabuchi (JPN); Nana Miyagi (JPN)	6	7

Semifinals
Li Si (CHN); Li Fang (CHN)	1	5
2	Satoshi Iwabuchi (JPN); Nana Miyagi (JPN)	6	7
