= Tennis at the 1998 Asian Games – Men's team =

Men's team at the 1998 Asian Games
- Venue: Muang Thong Thani Tennis Centre
- Dates: 8–12 December 1998
- Nations: 13

Medalists
gold medal	South Korea; Kim Dong-hyun, Lee Hyung-taik, Song Hyeong-keun, Yoon Yong-il
silver medal	Japan; Satoshi Iwabuchi, Hideki Kaneko, Michihisa Onoda, Takahiro Terachi
bronze medal	Uzbekistan; Vadim Kutsenko, Oleg Ogorodov, Dmitri Tomashevich
bronze medal	India; Mahesh Bhupathi, Syed Fazaluddin, Nitin Kirtane, Srinath Prahlad

Men's team
- Tennis at the 1998 Asian Games

Events
Singles	men	women
Doubles	men	women	mixed
Team	men	women
- Asian Games

The men's team tennis event was part of the tennis programme and took place between December 8 and 12, at Muang Thong Thani Tennis Centre.

South Korea won the gold medal.

== Schedule ==
All times are Indochina Time (UTC+07:00)

Date	Time	Event
Tuesday, 8 December 1998	09:00	1st round
Wednesday, 9 December 1998	09:00	Quarterfinals
Thursday, 10 December 1998	10:00	Quarterfinals
Friday, 11 December 1998	10:00	Semifinals
Saturday, 12 December 1998	10:00	Final

== Results ==
1st round
Iran	0
Chinese Taipei	3
Thailand	3
China	0
4	India	3
Qatar	0
Philippines	1
Pakistan	2
Kuwait	0
Indonesia	3

Quarterfinals
1	Uzbekistan	2
Chinese Taipei	1
Thailand	1
3	South Korea	2
4	India	3
Pakistan	0
Indonesia	1
2	Japan	2

Semifinals
1	Uzbekistan	0
3	South Korea	3
4	India	0
2	Japan	3

Final
3	South Korea	3
2	Japan	0

=== 1st round ===
8 December	Iran	0–3	Chinese Taipei

8 December	Thailand	3–0	China

8 December	India	3–0	Qatar

Syed Fazaluddin	2–0	Mohammed Ali Al-Saoud	6–2, 6–1
Srinath Prahlad	2–0	Sultan Al-Alawi	6–1, 6–2
Nitin Kirtane / Syed Fazaluddin	2–0	Sultan Al-Alawi / Mohammed Ali Al-Saoud	6–1, 6–1

8 December	Philippines	1–2	Pakistan

8 December	Kuwait	0–3	Indonesia

=== Quarterfinals ===
10 December	Uzbekistan	2–1	Chinese Taipei

10 December	Thailand	1–2	South Korea

9 December	India	3–0	Pakistan

Srinath Prahlad	2–0	Muhammad Khaliq	6–3, 6–2
Mahesh Bhupathi	2–0	Aisam-ul-Haq Qureshi	6–4, 7–5
Syed Fazaluddin / Nitin Kirtane	2–0	Muhammad Khaliq / Aisam-ul-Haq Qureshi	6–4, 6–2

9 December	Indonesia	1–2	Japan

=== Semifinals ===
11 December	Uzbekistan	0–3	South Korea

11 December	India	0–3	Japan

Srinath Prahlad	1–2	Satoshi Iwabuchi	6–3, 3–6, 2–6
Mahesh Bhupathi	0–2	Hideki Kaneko	3–6, 3–6
Nitin Kirtane / Syed Fazaluddin	0–2	Takahiro Terachi / Michihisa Onoda	3–6, 4–6

=== Final ===
12 December	South Korea	3–0	Japan

Yoon Yong-il	2–0	Satoshi Iwabuchi	6–1, 6–2
Lee Hyung-taik	2–0	Hideki Kaneko	7–6^{(7–3)}, 7–6^{(7–4)}
Kim Dong-hyun / Song Hyeong-keun	2–1	Takahiro Terachi / Michihisa Onoda	3–6, 6–2, 6–2
