= 2000 Davis Cup Asia/Oceania Zone Group I =

International tennis competition

The Asia/Oceania Zone was one of the three zones of the regional Davis Cup competition in 2000.

In the Asia/Oceania Zone there were four different tiers, called groups, in which teams competed against each other to advance to the upper tier. Winners in Group I advanced to the World Group qualifying round, along with losing teams from the World Group first round. Teams who lost their respective ties competed in the relegation play-offs, with winning teams remaining in Group I, whereas teams who lost their play-offs were relegated to the Asia/Oceania Zone Group II in 2001.

== Participating nations ==
- China
- India
- Japan
- Lebanon
- New Zealand
- South Korea
- Thailand
- Uzbekistan

=== Draw ===
Second Round Play-offs
Jounieh, Lebanon (indoor hard)
China	3
Lebanon	2

First Round Play-offs
Tianjin, China (indoor hard)
China	1
Thailand	4
Yokohama, Japan (indoor carpet)
Lebanon	1
Japan	4

First Round
Kunming, China (hard)
Uzbekistan	3
China	0
Timaru, New Zealand (hard)
New Zealand	4
Thailand	1
Lucknow, India (grass)
Lebanon	2
India	3
Kashima, Japan (indoor carpet)
South Korea	3
Japan	2

Second Round
Tashkent, Uzbekistan (indoor hard)
Uzbekistan	4
New Zealand	1
New Delhi, India (grass)
India	4
South Korea	1

- Lebanon relegated to Group II in 2001.
- Uzbekistan and India advance to World Group qualifying round.

== First round ==
=== China vs. Uzbekistan ===
China
0
Hai-Geng Sports Club, Kunming, China
28–30 January 2000
Hard

Uzbekistan
3

			1	2	3	4	5
1	(China) (Uzbekistan)	Zhu Benqiang; Vadim Kutsenko	4; 6	7^{7} 6^{5}	3; 6	7^{7} 6^{2}	3; 6
2	(China) (Uzbekistan)	Zhang Yu; Oleg Ogorodov	6^{5} 7^{7}	3; 6	4; 6
3	(China) (Uzbekistan)	Xu Ran / Yang Jingzhu; Oleg Ogorodov / Dmitri Tomashevich	6^{1} 7^{7}	6^{1} 7^{7}	3; 6
4	(China) (Uzbekistan)	Zhu Benqiang; Oleg Ogorodov						not played
5	(China) (Uzbekistan)	Zhang Yu; Vadim Kutsenko						not played

=== New Zealand vs. Thailand ===
New Zealand
4
Desmond Unwi Tennis Club, Timaru, New Zealand
4–6 February 2000
Hard

Thailand
1

			1	2	3	4	5
1	(New Zealand) (Thailand)	Mark Nielsen; Danai Udomchoke	6; 1	6; 1	6; 3
2	(New Zealand) (Thailand)	Alistair Hunt; Paradorn Srichaphan	7^{8} 6^{6}	7^{9} 6^{7}	3; 6	6; 1
3	(New Zealand) (Thailand)	James Greenhalgh / Alistair Hunt; Ekkarin Pisuth-Arnonth / Vittaya Samrej	6; 1	6; 0	6; 2
4	(New Zealand) (Thailand)	Mark Nielsen; Ekkarin Pisuth-Arnonth	6; 2	7; 5
5	(New Zealand) (Thailand)	James Shortall; Danai Udomchoke	7^{7} 6^{4}	6^{4} 7^{7}	1; 6

=== India vs. Lebanon ===
India
3
Oudh Gymkhana Club, Lucknow, India
4–6 February 2000
Grass

Lebanon
2

			1	2	3	4	5
1	(India) (Lebanon)	Leander Paes; Ali Hamadeh	6; 4	7; 5	7^{7} 6^{3}
2	(India) (Lebanon)	Syed Fazaluddin; Jicham Zaatini	6; 4	3; 6	7; 5	7^{7} 6^{3}
3	(India) (Lebanon)	Leander Paes / Syed Fazaluddin; Ali Hamadeh / Jicham Zaatini	7^{7} 6^{2}	6^{3} 7^{7}	6; 4	3; 6	4; 6
4	(India) (Lebanon)	Leander Paes; Jicham Zaatini	6; 3	6; 1	6; 4
5	(India) (Lebanon)	Syed Fazaluddin; Ali Hamadeh	6; 2	5; 7	1; 6

=== Japan vs. South Korea ===
Japan
2
Kashima City Sports Club, Kashima, Japan
4–6 February 2000
Carpet (indoors)

South Korea
3

			1	2	3	4	5
1	(Japan) (South Korea)	Yaoki Ishii; Lee Hyung-taik	6; 4	6; 4	2; 6	1; 6	8; 10
2	(Japan) (South Korea)	Gouichi Motomura; Yoon Yong-il	6; 3	4; 6	6; 4	2; 6	6; 3
3	(Japan) (South Korea)	Satoshi Iwabuchi / Thomas Shimada; Lee Hyung-taik / Yoon Yong-il	6^{4} 7^{7}	4; 6	6; 3	2; 6
4	(Japan) (South Korea)	Gouichi Motomura; Lee Hyung-taik	5; 7	4; 6	5; 7
5	(Japan) (South Korea)	Yaoki Ishii; Chung Hee-sung	6; 4	6; 4

== Second round ==
=== Uzbekistan vs. New Zealand ===
Uzbekistan
4
Yunus Abad Tennis Club, Tashkent, Uzbekistan
7–9 April 2000
Hard (indoors)

New Zealand
1

			1	2	3	4	5
1	(Uzbekistan) (New Zealand)	Vadim Kutsenko; Mark Nielsen	7^{7} 6^{3}	6; 3	6; 2
2	(Uzbekistan) (New Zealand)	Oleg Ogorodov; Alistair Hunt	7^{7} 6^{2}	6; 2	6^{4} 7^{7}	7; 5
3	(Uzbekistan) (New Zealand)	Oleg Ogorodov / Dmitri Tomashevich; James Greenhalgh / Alistair Hunt	7; 5	7^{7} 6^{5}	6; 4
4	(Uzbekistan) (New Zealand)	Oleg Ogorodov; Mark Nielsen	2; 6	6; 1	5; 7
5	(Uzbekistan) (New Zealand)	Dmitri Mazur; James Greenhalgh	7^{7} 6^{2}	6; 4

=== India vs. South Korea ===
India
4
R. K. Khanna Tennis Complex, New Delhi, India
7–9 April 2000
Grass

South Korea
1

			1	2	3	4	5
1	(India) (South Korea)	Leander Paes; Yoon Yong-il	6; 4	6; 2	6; 3
2	(India) (South Korea)	Syed Fazaluddin; Lee Hyung-taik	4; 6	5; 7	2; 6
3	(India) (South Korea)	Leander Paes / Vishal Uppal; Lee Hyung-taik / Yoon Yong-il	6^{5} 7^{7}	6; 4	6; 4	7^{7} 6^{4}
4	(India) (South Korea)	Leander Paes; Lee Hyung-taik	6; 1	3; 6	7^{7} 6^{3}	6; 4
5	(India) (South Korea)	Syed Fazaluddin; Lee Seung-hoon	6; 0	6^{2} 7^{7}	6; 2

== First round relegation play-offs ==
=== China vs. Thailand ===
China
1
Tianjin Sports Centre, Tianjin, China
7–9 April 2000
Hard (indoors)

Thailand
4

			1	2	3	4	5
1	(China) (Thailand)	Zhang Yu; Paradorn Srichaphan	3; 6	2; 6	1; 6
2	(China) (Thailand)	Zhu Benqiang; Danai Udomchoke	7^{7} 6^{5}	6; 2	6; 0
3	(China) (Thailand)	Li Si / Xu Ran; Paradorn Srichaphan / Danai Udomchoke	2; 6	7^{9} 6^{7}	6; 2	3; 6	4; 6
4	(China) (Thailand)	Zhu Benqiang; Paradorn Srichaphan	5; 7	3; 6	4; 6
5	(China) (Thailand)	Zhang Yu; Danai Udomchoke	2; 6	4; 6

=== Japan vs. Lebanon ===
Japan
4
International Swimming Complex, Yokohama, Japan
7–9 April 2000
Carpet (indoors)

Lebanon
1

			1	2	3	4	5
1	(Japan) (Lebanon)	Yaoki Ishii; Jicham Zaatini	6; 4	6; 3	6; 3
2	(Japan) (Lebanon)	Gouichi Motomura; Ali Hamadeh	6; 3	6; 3	6; 1
3	(Japan) (Lebanon)	Satoshi Iwabuchi / Thomas Shimada; Ali Hamadeh / Jicham Zaatini	6^{6} 7^{8}	4; 6	4; 6
4	(Japan) (Lebanon)	Gouichi Motomura; Jicham Zaatini	6; 1	5; 7	6; 4	6; 4
5	(Japan) (Lebanon)	Yaoki Ishii; Ali Hamadeh	6; 2	6; 4

== Second round relegation play-offs ==
=== Lebanon vs. China ===
Lebanon
2
Kahraba Tennis Club, Jounieh, Lebanon
6–8 October 2000
Hard (indoors)

China
3

			1	2	3	4	5
1	(Lebanon) (China)	Jicham Zaatini; Wang Yu	2; 6	6; 3	6; 3	7; 5
2	(Lebanon) (China)	Ali Hamadeh; Zhu Benqiang	6; 4	4; 6	3; 6	4; 6
3	(Lebanon) (China)	Ali Hamadeh / Jicham Zaatini; Xu Ran / Zhu Benqiang	6; 3	6^{9} 7^{11}	4; 6	5; 7
4	(Lebanon) (China)	Jicham Zaatini; Zhu Benqiang	6; 4	3; 6	4; 6	4; 6
5	(Lebanon) (China)	Ali Hamadeh; Zhang Yu	7^{8} 6^{6}	7; 5
