= 1996 KAL Cup Korea Open – Singles =

Singles
- 1996 KAL Cup Korea Open

Final
- Champion: (Zimbabwe) Byron Black
- Runner-up: (Czech Republic) Martin Damm
- Score: 7–6^{(7–3)}, 6–3

Details
- Draw: 32
- Seeds: 8

Events
Singles	Doubles
← 1995 ·	KAL Cup Korea Open

Greg Rusedski was the defending champion but lost in the quarterfinals to Martin Damm.

Byron Black won in the final 7–6^{(7–3)}, 6–3 against Damm.

== Seeds ==
A champion seed is indicated in bold text while text in italics indicates the round in which that seed was eliminated.

1. (Zimbabwe) **Byron Black (champion)**
2. (United Kingdom) Greg Rusedski (quarterfinals)
3. (United Kingdom) Tim Henman (semifinals)
4. (Denmark) Kenneth Carlsen (second round)
5. (Japan) Shuzo Matsuoka (quarterfinals)
6. (Belgium) Johan van Herck (first round)
7. n/a
8. (United States) Jeff Tarango (second round)

== Draw ==
=== Key ===
- Q = Qualifier
- WC = Wild card
- LL = Lucky loser
- Alt = Alternate
- SE = Special exempt
- PR = Protected ranking
- ITF = ITF entry
- JE = Junior exempt
- w/o = Walkover
- r = Retired
- d = Defaulted
- SR = Special ranking

=== Finals ===
Semifinals
1	(Zimbabwe) **Byron Black**	**6**	**6**
3	(United Kingdom) Tim Henman	2	4
(Slovakia) Ján Krošlák	3	5
(Czech Republic) **Martin Damm**	**6**	**7**

Final
1	(Zimbabwe) **Byron Black**	**7^{7}**	**6**
(Czech Republic) Martin Damm	6^{3}	3

=== Top half ===
First round
1	(Zimbabwe) **B Black**	**6**	**6**
Q	(South Korea) S-H Lee	0	3
(Canada) **S Lareau**	**6**	**6**
(The Bahamas) M Knowles	4	2
WC	(South Korea) M-K Han	1	3
(Italy) **G Pozzi**	**6**	**6**
(Sweden) M Norman	6^{0}	4
8	(United States) **J Tarango**	**7^{7}**	**6**
3	(United Kingdom) **T Henman**	**6**	**6**
(Belgium) D Norman	1	4
(Sweden) **T Johansson**	**6**	**6**
WC	(South Korea) Y-I Yoon	2	1
WC	(South Korea) H-T Lee	3	**6**	1
(Germany) **A Rădulescu**	**6**	3	**6**
Q	(South Africa) K Ullyett	**7^{7}**	3	2
5	(Japan) **S Matsuoka**	6^{1}	**6**	**6**

Second round
1	(Zimbabwe) **B Black**	w/o
(Canada) S Lareau
(Italy) **G Pozzi**	**6**	**7**
8	(United States) J Tarango	3	5
3	(United Kingdom) **T Henman**	**6**	**7**
(Sweden) T Johansson	3	5
(Germany) A Rădulescu	4	1
5	(Japan) **S Matsuoka**	**6**	**6**

Quarterfinals
1	(Zimbabwe) **B Black**	**6**	**6**
(Italy) G Pozzi	3	1
3	(United Kingdom) **T Henman**	3	**7^{7}**	**6**
5	(Japan) S Matsuoka	**6**	6^{3}	3

Semifinals
1	(Zimbabwe) **B Black**	**6**	**6**
3	(United Kingdom) T Henman	2	4

=== Bottom half ===
First round
6	(Belgium) J van Herck	5	1
(Slovakia) **J Krošlák**	**7**	**6**
(Germany) **J Renzenbrink**	**6**	**6**
(Portugal) J Cunha e Silva	3	4
(Uzbekistan) **O Ogorodov**	**6**	**6**
Q	(Canada) A Chang	2	2
(Italy) C Caratti	4	0
4	(Denmark) **K Carlsen**	**6**	**6**
LL	(United States) **J Grabb**	**6**	4	**6**
(United Kingdom) C Wilkinson	4	**6**	4
(Czech Republic) **M Damm**	6^{5}	**7^{7}**	**6**
(France) L Roux	**7^{7}**	6^{2}	4
(Germany) P Baur	3	4
Q	(United States) **J Stark**	**6**	**6**
(France) J-P Fleurian	6^{4}	4
2	(United Kingdom) **G Rusedski**	**7^{7}**	**6**

Second round
(Slovakia) **J Krošlák**	**6**	**6**
(Germany) J Renzenbrink	2	3
(Uzbekistan) **O Ogorodov**	4	**6**	**6**
4	(Denmark) K Carlsen	**6**	2	3
LL	(United States) J Grabb	3	0
(Czech Republic) **M Damm**	**6**	**6**
Q	(United States) J Stark	**6**	6^{5}	3
2	(United Kingdom) **G Rusedski**	1	**7^{7}**	**6**

Quarterfinals
(Slovakia) **J Krošlák**	**7**	4	**6**
(Uzbekistan) O Ogorodov	5	**6**	2
(Czech Republic) **M Damm**	**6**	6^{5}	**7**
2	(United Kingdom) G Rusedski	4	**7^{7}**	5

Semifinals
(Slovakia) J Krošlák	3	5
(Czech Republic) **M Damm**	**6**	**7**
