= Tennis at the 1998 Asian Games =

- Venue: Muang Thong Thani Tennis Centre
- Dates: 8–18 December 1998
- Nations: 17

Tennis was contested at the 1998 Asian Games in Bangkok, Thailand from 8 to 18 December 1998. Tennis had team, doubles, and singles events for men and women, as well as a mixed doubles competition.

South Korea finished first in the medal table winning two gold medals.

== Schedule ==
P	Preliminary rounds	¼	Quarterfinals	½	Semifinals	F	Final

Event↓/Date →	8th Tue	9th Wed	10th Thu	11th Fri	12th Sat	13th Sun	14th Mon	15th Tue	16th Wed	17th Thu	18th Fri
Men's singles						P	P	¼	¼	½	F
Men's doubles						P	P	¼	½	F	
Men's team	P	¼	¼	½	F						
Women's singles					P	P	¼	¼	½	F	
Women's doubles					P		¼	¼	½	½	F
Women's team	¼	¼	½	F							
Mixed doubles						P	P	¼	½	F	

== Medalists ==
Event	Gold	Silver	Bronze
Men's singles	Yoon Yong-il; South Korea	Satoshi Iwabuchi; Japan	Mahesh Bhupathi; India
Men's singles	Yoon Yong-il; South Korea	Satoshi Iwabuchi; Japan	Srinath Prahlad; India
Men's doubles	Thailand; Paradorn Srichaphan; Narathorn Srichaphan	South Korea; Lee Hyung-taik; Yoon Yong-il	Japan; Michihisa Onoda; Takahiro Terachi
Men's doubles	Thailand; Paradorn Srichaphan; Narathorn Srichaphan	South Korea; Lee Hyung-taik; Yoon Yong-il	Chinese Taipei; Chen Chih-jung; Lin Bing-chao
Men's team	South Korea; Kim Dong-hyun; Lee Hyung-taik; Song Hyeong-keun; Yoon Yong-il	Japan; Satoshi Iwabuchi; Hideki Kaneko; Michihisa Onoda; Takahiro Terachi	Uzbekistan; Vadim Kutsenko; Oleg Ogorodov; Dmitri Tomashevich
Men's team	South Korea; Kim Dong-hyun; Lee Hyung-taik; Song Hyeong-keun; Yoon Yong-il	Japan; Satoshi Iwabuchi; Hideki Kaneko; Michihisa Onoda; Takahiro Terachi	India; Mahesh Bhupathi; Syed Fazaluddin; Nitin Kirtane; Srinath Prahlad
Women's singles	Yayuk Basuki; Indonesia	Tamarine Tanasugarn; Thailand	Yi Jingqian; China
Women's singles	Yayuk Basuki; Indonesia	Tamarine Tanasugarn; Thailand	Li Fang; China
Women's doubles	China; Li Fang; Chen Li	South Korea; Cho Yoon-jeong; Park Sung-hee	Japan; Rika Hiraki; Nana Miyagi
Women's doubles	China; Li Fang; Chen Li	South Korea; Cho Yoon-jeong; Park Sung-hee	China; Yi Jingqian; Li Li
Women's team	Chinese Taipei; Hsu Hsueh-li; Janet Lee; Wang Shi-ting; Weng Tzu-ting	China; Chen Li; Li Fang; Li Li; Yi Jingqian	Japan; Rika Hiraki; Haruka Inoue; Nana Miyagi; Yuka Yoshida
Women's team	Chinese Taipei; Hsu Hsueh-li; Janet Lee; Wang Shi-ting; Weng Tzu-ting	China; Chen Li; Li Fang; Li Li; Yi Jingqian	Indonesia; Liza Andriyani; Yayuk Basuki; Irawati Moerid Iskandar; Wynne Prakusya
Mixed doubles	Japan; Satoshi Iwabuchi; Nana Miyagi	South Korea; Kim Dong-hyun; Choi Ju-yeon	India; Mahesh Bhupathi; Nirupama Vaidyanathan
Mixed doubles	Japan; Satoshi Iwabuchi; Nana Miyagi	South Korea; Kim Dong-hyun; Choi Ju-yeon	China; Li Si; Li Fang

== Medal table ==
Rank	Nation	Gold	Silver	Bronze	Total
1	South Korea (KOR)	2	3	0	5
2	Japan (JPN)	1	2	3	6
3	China (CHN)	1	1	4	6
4	Thailand (THA)	1	1	0	2
5	Chinese Taipei (TPE)	1	0	1	2
5	Indonesia (INA)	1	0	1	2
7	India (IND)	0	0	4	4
8	Uzbekistan (UZB)	0	0	1	1
Totals (8 entries)		7	7	14	28

== Participating nations ==
- China (8)
- Chinese Taipei (12)
- Hong Kong (3)
- India (9)
- Indonesia
- Iran (3)
- Japan (9)
- Kazakhstan (2)
- Kuwait (3)
- Lebanon (2)
- Mongolia (1)
- Pakistan (5)
- Philippines (4)
- Qatar
- South Korea (10)
- Thailand (9)
- Uzbekistan
