= 1996 KAL Cup Korea Open – Doubles =

Doubles
- 1996 KAL Cup Korea Open

Final
- Champions: (United States) Rick Leach (United States) Jonathan Stark
- Runners-up: (United States) Kent Kinnear (South Africa) Kevin Ullyett
- Score: 6–4, 6–4

Details
- Draw: 16
- Seeds: 4

Events
Singles	Doubles
← 1995 ·	KAL Cup Korea Open

Sébastien Lareau and Jeff Tarango were the defending champions but only Tarango competed that year with David Pate.

Pate and Tarango lost in the quarterfinals to Kent Kinnear and Kevin Ullyett.

Rick Leach and Jonathan Stark won in the final 6–4, 6–4 against Kinnear and Ullyett.

== Seeds ==
1. (United States) Rick Leach / (United States) Jonathan Stark (champions)
2. (Australia) Wayne Arthurs / (United States) Jack Waite (first round)
3. (United States) David Pate / (United States) Jeff Tarango (quarterfinals)
4. (United Kingdom) Tim Henman / (South Africa) Gary Muller (semifinals)

== Draw ==
=== Key ===
- Q = Qualifier
- WC = Wild card
- LL = Lucky loser
- Alt = Alternate
- SE = Special exempt
- PR = Protected ranking
- ITF = ITF entry
- JE = Junior exempt
- w/o = Walkover
- r = Retired
- d = Defaulted
- SR = Special ranking

First round
1	(United States) R Leach (United States) J Stark	6	6
(Portugal) J Cunha e Silva (Switzerland) L Manta	3	2
Q	(South Korea) J-S Chung (South Korea) S-H Ji	3	4
WC	(South Korea) H-T Lee (South Korea) Y-I Yoon	6	6
4	(United Kingdom) T Henman (South Africa) G Muller	6	6
WC	(South Korea) M-K Han (South Korea) C-W Kim	2	3
(France) J-P Fleurian (The Bahamas) R Smith	7	6
(Uzbekistan) O Ogorodov (France) L Roux	6	3
(Denmark) K Carlsen (Kenya) P Wekesa	1	6
(United States) K Kinnear (South Africa) K Ullyett	6	7
(Sweden) T Johansson (Sweden) M Norman	6	1
3	(United States) D Pate (United States) J Tarango	7	6
(Belgium) D Norman (Belgium) J van Herck	3	4
WC	(South Korea) D-H Kim (South Korea) J-M Lee	6	6
(Germany) P Baur (Germany) J Renzenbrink	6	6
2	(Australia) W Arthurs (United States) J Waite	2	4

Quarterfinals
1	(United States) R Leach (United States) J Stark	6	6
WC	(South Korea) H-T Lee (South Korea) Y-I Yoon	3	1
4	(United Kingdom) T Henman (South Africa) G Muller	6	6
(France) J-P Fleurian (The Bahamas) R Smith	3	2
(United States) K Kinnear (South Africa) K Ullyett	2	7	6
3	(United States) D Pate (United States) J Tarango	6	6	3
WC	(South Korea) D-H Kim (South Korea) J-M Lee	7	6
(Germany) P Baur (Germany) J Renzenbrink	5	0

Semifinals
1	(United States) R Leach (United States) J Stark	6	6
4	(United Kingdom) T Henman (South Africa) G Muller	3	3
(United States) K Kinnear (South Africa) K Ullyett	6	7	6
WC	(South Korea) D-H Kim (South Korea) J-M Lee	7	6	2

Final
1	(United States) R Leach (United States) J Stark	6	6
(United States) K Kinnear (South Africa) K Ullyett	4	4
