= Tennis at the 1998 Asian Games – Men's singles =

Men's singles at the 1998 Asian Games
- Venue: Muang Thong Thani Tennis Centre
- Dates: 13–18 December 1998
- Competitors: 27 from 15 nations

Medalists
gold medal	Yoon Yong-il	South Korea
silver medal	Satoshi Iwabuchi	Japan
bronze medal	Mahesh Bhupathi	India
bronze medal	Srinath Prahlad	India

Men's singles
- Tennis at the 1998 Asian Games

Events
Singles	men	women
Doubles	men	women	mixed
Team	men	women
- Asian Games

The men's singles tennis event was part of the tennis programme and took place between December 13 and 18, at the Muang Thong Thani Tennis Centre.

== Schedule ==
All times are Indochina Time (UTC+07:00)

Date	Time	Event
Sunday, 13 December 1998	10:00	1st round
Monday, 14 December 1998	10:00	2nd round
Tuesday, 15 December 1998	10:00	Quarterfinals
Wednesday, 16 December 1998	10:00	Quarterfinals
Thursday, 17 December 1998	10:00	Semifinals
Friday, 18 December 1998	10:00	Final

== Results ==
Legend

- r — Retired

=== Final ===
Final
6	Satoshi Iwabuchi (JPN)	7	4	3	2
5	Yoon Yong-il (KOR)	5	6	6	6

=== Top half ===
1st round
Wayne Wong (HKG)	6	4
Danai Udomchoke (THA)	7	6
Bryan Junio (PHI)	6	6
Akbar Taheri (IRI)	4	3
Mohammad Ghareeb (KUW)	2	1
7	Mahesh Bhupathi (IND)	6	6
Zhang Yu (CHN)	4	4
Lin Bing-chao (TPE)	6	6
Ali Hamadeh (LIB)	7	1	r
Sultan Al-Alawi (QAT)	5	6
Aisam-ul-Haq Qureshi (PAK)	2	4
6	Satoshi Iwabuchi (JPN)	6	6

2nd round
1	Oleg Ogorodov (UZB)	6	6
Danai Udomchoke (THA)	3	4
Bryan Junio (PHI)	6^{4}	2
7	Mahesh Bhupathi (IND)	7^{7}	6
3	Lee Hyung-taik (KOR)	7^{7}	2	6
Lin Bing-chao (TPE)	6^{2}	6	0
Sultan Al-Alawi (QAT)	0	1
6	Satoshi Iwabuchi (JPN)	6	6

Quarterfinals
1	Oleg Ogorodov (UZB)	3	6	5
7	Mahesh Bhupathi (IND)	6	3	7
3	Lee Hyung-taik (KOR)	4	5
6	Satoshi Iwabuchi (JPN)	6	7

Semifinals
7	Mahesh Bhupathi (IND)	4	6^{1}
6	Satoshi Iwabuchi (JPN)	6	7^{7}

=== Bottom half ===
1st round
D. Erdenebileg (MGL)	0	0
Ramin Raziani (IRI)	6	6
Zhu Benqiang (CHN)	4	3
Takahiro Terachi (JPN)	6	6
8	Srinath Prahlad (IND)	6	6
Adel Al-Shatti (KUW)	2	3
Chen Wei-ju (TPE)	3	6	6
Joseph Lizardo (PHI)	6	2	1
Melvin Tong (HKG)	6	2	6
Muhammad Khaliq (PAK)	3	6	2

2nd round
5	Yoon Yong-il (KOR)	6	6
Ramin Raziani (IRI)	3	3
Takahiro Terachi (JPN)	6	6
4	Paradorn Srichaphan (THA)	1	3
8	Srinath Prahlad (IND)	6	7
Chen Wei-ju (TPE)	4	5
Melvin Tong (HKG)	0	4
2	Vadim Kutsenko (UZB)	6	6

Quarterfinals
5	Yoon Yong-il (KOR)	7	6
Takahiro Terachi (JPN)	5	4
8	Srinath Prahlad (IND)	6	6
2	Vadim Kutsenko (UZB)	4	2

Semifinals
5	Yoon Yong-il (KOR)	6	6
8	Srinath Prahlad (IND)	3	3
