= Tennis at the 1998 Asian Games – Women's doubles =

Women's doubles at the 1998 Asian Games
- Venue: Muang Thong Thani Tennis Centre
- Dates: 12–18 December 1998
- Competitors: 32 from 9 nations

Medalists
gold medal	Li Fang; Chen Li	China
silver medal	Cho Yoon-jeong; Park Sung-hee	South Korea
bronze medal	Rika Hiraki; Nana Miyagi	Japan
bronze medal	Yi Jingqian; Li Li	China

Women's doubles
- Tennis at the 1998 Asian Games

Events
Singles	men	women
Doubles	men	women	mixed
Team	men	women
- Asian Games

The women's doubles tennis event was part of the tennis programme and took place between December 12 and 18, at Muang Thong Thani Tennis Centre.

Li Fang and Chen Li from China won the gold medal.

== Schedule ==
All times are Indochina Time (UTC+07:00)

Date	Time	Event
Saturday, 12 December 1998	10:00	1st round
Monday, 14 December 1998	10:00	Quarterfinals
Tuesday, 15 December 1998	10:00	Quarterfinals
Wednesday, 16 December 1998	10:00	Semifinals
Thursday, 17 December 1998	10:00	Semifinals
Friday, 18 December 1998	10:00	Final

== Results ==
1st round
1	Rika Hiraki (JPN); Nana Miyagi (JPN)	6	6
Sai Jayalakshmy Jayaram (IND); Uzma Khan (IND)	2	2
Choi Ju-yeon (KOR); Kim Eun-ha (KOR)	7	6
Chen Yu-an (TPE); Tsai Ya-fang (TPE)	5	3
3	Yayuk Basuki (INA); Wynne Prakusya (INA)	6	6
Lilia Biktyakova (UZB); Iroda Tulyaganova (UZB)	3	2
Li Fang (CHN); Chen Li (CHN)	6	6
Orawan Wongkamalasai (THA); Monthika Anuchan (THA)	2	4
Irina Selyutina (KAZ); Tatyana Babina (KAZ)	1	6	2
Yuka Yoshida (JPN); Saori Obata (JPN)	6	3	6
Manisha Malhotra (IND); Nirupama Vaidyanathan (IND)	2	2
4	Cho Yoon-jeong (KOR); Park Sung-hee (KOR)	6	6
Yi Jingqian (CHN); Li Li (CHN)	6	3	8
Tamarine Tanasugarn (THA); Benjamas Sangaram (THA)	2	6	6
Liza Andriyani (INA); Irawati Moerid Iskandar (INA)	1	2
2	Wang Shi-ting (TPE); Janet Lee (TPE)	6	6

Quarterfinals
1	Rika Hiraki (JPN); Nana Miyagi (JPN)	6	4	6
Choi Ju-yeon (KOR); Kim Eun-ha (KOR)	4	6	2
3	Yayuk Basuki (INA); Wynne Prakusya (INA)	5	7	4
Li Fang (CHN); Chen Li (CHN)	7	5	6
Yuka Yoshida (JPN); Saori Obata (JPN)	7	2	3
4	Cho Yoon-jeong (KOR); Park Sung-hee (KOR)	5	6	6
Yi Jingqian (CHN); Li Li (CHN)	6	4	7
2	Wang Shi-ting (TPE); Janet Lee (TPE)	1	6	5

Semifinals
1	Rika Hiraki (JPN); Nana Miyagi (JPN)	3	4
Li Fang (CHN); Chen Li (CHN)	6	6
4	Cho Yoon-jeong (KOR); Park Sung-hee (KOR)	6	6
Yi Jingqian (CHN); Li Li (CHN)	0	3

Final
Li Fang (CHN); Chen Li (CHN)	6	7^{7}
4	Cho Yoon-jeong (KOR); Park Sung-hee (KOR)	2	6^{2}
