= Tennis at the 1998 Asian Games – Women's team =

Women's team at the 1998 Asian Games
- Venue: Muang Thong Thani Tennis Centre
- Dates: 8–11 December 1998
- Nations: 8

Medalists
| gold medal | Chinese Taipei; Hsu Hsueh-li, Janet Lee, Wang Shi-ting, Weng Tzu-ting |
| silver medal | China; Chen Li, Li Fang, Li Li, Yi Jingqian |
| bronze medal | Japan; Rika Hiraki, Haruka Inoue, Nana Miyagi, Yuka Yoshida |
| bronze medal | Indonesia; Liza Andriyani, Yayuk Basuki, Irawati Moerid Iskandar, Wynne Prakusya |

Women's team
- Tennis at the 1998 Asian Games

Events
| Singles | men | women |
| Doubles | men | women | mixed |
| Team | men | women |
- Asian Games

The women's team tennis event was part of the tennis programme and took place between December 8 and 11, at Muang Thong Thani Tennis Centre.

== Schedule ==
All times are Indochina Time (UTC+07:00)

| Date | Time | Event |
|---|---|---|
| Tuesday, 8 December 1998 | 09:00 | Quarterfinals |
| Wednesday, 9 December 1998 | 09:00 | Quarterfinals |
| Thursday, 10 December 1998 | 10:00 | Semifinals |
| Friday, 11 December 1998 | 10:00 | Final |

== Results ==
Quarterfinals
1 | Chinese Taipei | 2
Thailand | 1
3 | Japan | 3
Uzbekistan | 0
India | 0
4 | Indonesia | 3
South Korea | 1
2 | China | 2

Semifinals
1 | Chinese Taipei | 2
3 | Japan | 1
4 | Indonesia | 0
2 | China | 3

Final
1 | Chinese Taipei | 2
2 | China | 1

=== Quarterfinals ===
| 9 December | Chinese Taipei | 2–1 | Thailand |

Wang Shi-ting | 1–2 | Tamarine Tanasugarn | 7–5, 0–6, 2–6
Janet Lee | 2–0 | Suvimol Duangchan | 6–3, 6–2
Janet Lee / Wang Shi-ting | 2–0 | Tamarine Tanasugarn / Benjamas Sangaram | 6–3, 7–6^{(7–4)}

| 9 December | Japan | 3–0 | Uzbekistan |

Haruka Inoue | 2–1 | Lilia Biktyakova | 5–7, 6–1, 6–2
Yuka Yoshida | 2–1 | Iroda Tulyaganova | 6–2, 6–7^{(5–7)}, 6–4
Rika Hiraki / Nana Miyagi | 2–0 | Lilia Biktyakova / Iroda Tulyaganova | 7–5, 6–4

| 8 December | India | 0–3 | Indonesia |

Uzma Khan | 0–2 | Wynne Prakusya | 6–7^{(2–7)}, 0–6
Nirupama Vaidyanathan | 0–2 | Yayuk Basuki | 6–7^{(1–7)}, 3–6
Manisha Malhotra / Sai Jayalakshmy Jayaram | 0–2 | Liza Andriyani / Irawati Moerid Iskandar | 3–6, 2–6

| 8 December | South Korea | 1–2 | China |

=== Semifinals ===
| 10 December | Chinese Taipei | 2–1 | Japan |

| 10 December | Indonesia | 0–3 | China |

Wynne Prakusya | 1–2 | Yi Jingqian | 7–6, 3–6, 4–6

=== Final ===
| 11 December | Chinese Taipei | 2–1 | China |

Janet Lee | 2–0 | Yi Jingqian | 6–3, 6–4
Wang Shi-ting | 0–2 | Li Fang | 1–6, 2–6
Janet Lee / Wang Shi-ting | 2–0 | Li Fang / Chen Li | 3–6, 6–4, 6–3
