= 1995 Seoul Open – Doubles =

Doubles
- 1995 Seoul Open

Final
- Champions: (Canada) Sébastien Lareau (United States) Jeff Tarango
- Runners-up: (Australia) Joshua Eagle (Australia) Andrew Florent
- Score: 6–3, 6–2

Details
- Draw: 16
- Seeds: 4

Events
Singles	Doubles
← 1994 ·	Seoul Open	· 1996 →

Stéphane Simian and Kenny Thorne were the defending champions, but did not participate this year.

Sébastien Lareau and Jeff Tarango won the title, defeating Joshua Eagle and Andrew Florent 6–3, 6–2 in the final.

== Seeds ==
1. (United States) Mark Keil / (Sweden) Peter Nyborg (first round)
2. (Netherlands) Hendrik Jan Davids / (Netherlands) Stephen Noteboom (semifinals)
3. (Portugal) Emanuel Couto / (Portugal) João Cunha e Silva (quarterfinals)
4. (Australia) Joshua Eagle / (Australia) Andrew Florent (final)

== Draw ==
=== Key ===
- Q = Qualifier
- WC = Wild card
- LL = Lucky loser
- Alt = Alternate
- SE = Special exempt
- PR = Protected ranking
- ITF = ITF entry
- JE = Junior exempt
- w/o = Walkover
- r = Retired
- d = Defaulted
- SR = Special ranking

=== Draw ===
First round
1	(United States) M Keil (Sweden) P Nyborg	1	2
WC	(South Korea) H-t Lee (South Korea) Y-i Yoon	6	6
(United States) K Jones (United States) D Pate	3	6	6
(United States) F Montana (United States) J Pugh	6	2	3
3	(Portugal) E Couto (Portugal) J Cunha e Silva	6	7
WC	(South Korea) H-c Shin (South Korea) N-h Kim	3	6
(Canada) S Lareau (United States) J Tarango	6	6
(United States) S Davis (United States) B MacPhie	1	2
(Australia) P Kilderry (Germany) A Mronz	1	3
(India) L Paes (Zimbabwe) K Ullyett	6	6
WC	(South Korea) E-j Chang (South Korea) C-w Kim	5	3
4	(Australia) J Eagle (Australia) A Florent	7	6
Q	(Australia) N Borwick (The Bahamas) R Smith	6	4
(Belgium) D Norman (Canada) G Rusedski	7	6
(South Africa) M Ondruska (South Africa) G Stafford	6	6	4
2	(Netherlands) HJ Davids (Netherlands) S Noteboom	1	7	6

Quarterfinals
WC	(South Korea) H-t Lee (South Korea) Y-i Yoon	1	7	1
(United States) K Jones (United States) D Pate	6	5	6
3	(Portugal) E Couto (Portugal) J Cunha e Silva	4	4
(Canada) S Lareau (United States) J Tarango	6	6
(India) L Paes (Zimbabwe) K Ullyett	7	2	3
4	(Australia) J Eagle (Australia) A Florent	5	6	6
(Belgium) D Norman (Canada) G Rusedski	6	6	4
2	(Netherlands) HJ Davids (Netherlands) S Noteboom	7	3	6

Semifinals
(United States) K Jones (United States) D Pate	3	6
(Canada) S Lareau (United States) J Tarango	6	7
4	(Australia) J Eagle (Australia) A Florent	7	6
2	(Netherlands) HJ Davids (Netherlands) S Noteboom	6	4

Final
(Canada) S Lareau (United States) J Tarango	6	6
4	(Australia) J Eagle (Australia) A Florent	3	2
