= 1995 Seoul Open – Singles =

Singles
- 1995 Seoul Open

Final
- Champion: (Canada) Greg Rusedski
- Runner-up: (Germany) Lars Rehmann
- Score: 6–4, 3–1^{r}

Details
- Draw: 32
- Seeds: 8

Events
Singles	Doubles
← 1994 ·	Seoul Open	· 1996 →

Jeremy Bates was the defending champion, but retired from his opening round match.

Greg Rusedski won the title, defeating Lars Rehmann, who retired from the final while Rusedski held a 6–4, 3–1 lead.

== Seeds ==
1. (Russia) Alexander Volkov (quarterfinals)
2. (Czech Republic) Martin Damm (second round)
3. (United Kingdom) Jeremy Bates (first round)
4. (United States) Jonathan Stark (first round)
5. (United States) Jeff Tarango (second round)
6. (Canada) Sébastien Lareau (first round)
7. (Italy) Gianluca Pozzi (second round)
8. (Canada) Greg Rusedski (champion)

== Draw ==
=== Key ===
- Q = Qualifier
- WC = Wild card
- LL = Lucky loser
- Alt = Alternate
- SE = Special exempt
- PR = Protected ranking
- ITF = ITF entry
- JE = Junior exempt
- w/o = Walkover
- r = Retired
- d = Defaulted
- SR = Special ranking

=== Finals ===
Semifinals
8	(Canada) Greg Rusedski	6	6
(Denmark) Kenneth Carlsen	4	3
Q	(China) Bing Pan	3	2
(Germany) Lars Rehmann	6	6

Final
8	(Canada) Greg Rusedski	6	3
(Germany) Lars Rehmann	4	1^{r}

=== Top half ===
First round
1	(Russia) A Volkov	4	7	2
(Sweden) A Järryd	6	5	0^{r}
(South Africa) M Ondruska	6	4	6
(Venezuela) N Pereira	2	6	3
WC	(South Korea) H-t Lee	6	7^{9}
WC	(South Korea) Y-i Yoon	6^{7}	3
(United States) M Joyce	6^{4}	6	3
8	(Canada) G Rusedski	7^{7}	1	6
4	(United States) J Stark	4	6^{5}
(Mexico) L Herrera	6	7^{7}
(United Kingdom) M Petchey	7	4	1
(Denmark) K Carlsen	5	6	6
(United States) T Ho	7^{7}	6
(Japan) S Matsuoka	6^{2}	3
Q	(Germany) A Rădulescu	6	6^{2}	6
6	(Canada) S Lareau	3	7^{7}	1

Second round
1	(Russia) A Volkov	5	6	6
(South Africa) M Ondruska	7	3	3
WC	(South Korea) H-t Lee	4	4
8	(Canada) G Rusedski	6	6
(Mexico) L Herrera	3	5
(Denmark) K Carlsen	6	7
(United States) T Ho	2	6	6
Q	(Germany) A Rădulescu	6	3	2

Quarterfinals
1	(Russia) A Volkov	5	6	5
8	(Canada) G Rusedski	7	3	7
(Denmark) K Carlsen	2	6	6
(United States) T Ho	6	3	4

Semifinals
8	(Canada) G Rusedski	6	6
(Denmark) K Carlsen	4	3

=== Bottom half ===
First round
5	(United States) J Tarango	6	6
(India) L Paes	3	1
(Germany) A Mronz	3
(Germany) C Arriens	2^{r}
LL	(United States) F Montana	6^{9}	7^{7}	3
Q	(Portugal) E Couto	7^{11}	6^{3}	6
Q	(China) B Pan	6	2
3	(United Kingdom) J Bates	1	0^{r}
7	(Italy) G Pozzi	6	7
(Australia) W Masur	4	5
LL	(Germany) J Weinzierl	3	6^{8}
(Kenya) P Wekesa	6	7^{10}
WC	(South Korea) E-j Chang	3	1
(Germany) L Rehmann	6	6
Q	(South Africa) G Stafford	3	7	6^{2}
2	(Czech Republic) M Damm	6	5	7^{7}

Second round
5	(United States) J Tarango	3	6	3
(Germany) A Mronz	6	4	6
Q	(Portugal) E Couto	6^{3}	6	2
Q	(China) B Pan	7^{7}	3	6
7	(Italy) G Pozzi	4	6	6^{2}
(Kenya) P Wekesa	6	3	7^{7}
(Germany) L Rehmann	6	6
2	(Czech Republic) M Damm	2	4

Quarterfinals
(Germany) A Mronz	6	6^{6}	5
Q	(China) B Pan	4	7^{8}	7
(Kenya) P Wekesa	3	4
(Germany) L Rehmann	6	6

Semifinals
Q	(China) B Pan	3	2
(Germany) L Rehmann	6	6
