= 2000 Japan Open Tennis Championships – Men's singles =

Men's singles
- 2000 Japan Open Tennis Championships

Final
- Champion: (Netherlands) Sjeng Schalken
- Runner-up: (Ecuador) Nicolás Lapentti
- Score: 6–4, 3–6, 6–1

Details
- Draw: 56
- Seeds: 16

Events
Singles	men	women
Doubles	men	women
- Japan Open

Nicolas Kiefer was the defending champion, but did not participate.

Sjeng Schalken won the title, defeating Nicolás Lapentti in the final 6–4, 3–6, 6–1.

== Seeds ==
The top eight seeds received a bye into the second round.

1. (Brazil) Gustavo Kuerten (quarterfinals)
2. ~~(withdrew)~~
3. (Australia) Mark Philippoussis (quarterfinals)
4. (Ecuador) Nicolás Lapentti (final)
5. (United States) Michael Chang (second round)
6. (Zimbabwe) Byron Black (quarterfinals)
7. (Slovakia) Dominik Hrbatý (semifinals)
8. (Morocco) Hicham Arazi (semifinals)
9. (Slovakia) Karol Kučera (third round)
10. (Australia) Andrew Ilie (first round)
11. (Argentina) Mariano Zabaleta (first round)
12. (Netherlands) Sjeng Schalken (champion)
13. (Sweden) Jonas Björkman (third round)
14. (Germany) David Prinosil (second round)
15. (Israel) Harel Levy (third round)
16. (Belgium) Christophe Rochus (first round)

== Draw ==
Key

- Q = Qualifier
- WC = Wild card
- LL = Lucky loser
- Alt = Alternate
- ITF = ITF entry
- PR = Protected ranking
- SR = Special ranking
- SE = Special exempt
- JE = Junior exempt
- JR = Junior Accelerator Programme entrant
- CO = College Accelerator Programme entrant
- NG = Next Gen Accelerator Program entrant
- w/o = Walkover
- r = Retired
- d = Defaulted

=== Finals ===
Semifinals
7	(Slovakia) Dominik Hrbatý	3	4
4	(Ecuador) Nicolás Lapentti	6	6
12	(Netherlands) Sjeng Schalken	4	6	7^{9}
8	(Morocco) Hicham Arazi	6	3	6^{7}

Final
4	(Ecuador) Nicolás Lapentti	4	6	1
12	(Netherlands) Sjeng Schalken	6	3	6

=== Top half ===
==== Section 1 ====
First round
(Chile) N Massú	6	6
WC	(Japan) S Iwabuchi	2	3
(India) L Paes	7^{8}	6
(Sweden) F Jonsson	6^{6}	3
(Italy) A Gaudenzi	4	6	6
16	(Belgium) C Rochus	6	3	4
9	(Slovakia) K Kučera	6	6
(United States) P Goldstein	1	2
Q	(Czech Republic) L Friedl	4	6	6
(Italy) D Sanguinetti	6	1	4
(Italy) L Tieleman	6	7
WC	(Japan) J Miyao	4	5

Second round
1	(Brazil) G Kuerten	7^{7}	6
(Chile) N Massú	6^{5}	0
(India) L Paes	3	2
(Italy) A Gaudenzi	6	6
9	(Slovakia) K Kučera	6	4	6
Q	(Czech Republic) L Friedl	1	6	4
(Italy) L Tieleman	6^{6}	5
7	(Slovakia) D Hrbatý	7^{8}	7

Third round
1	(Brazil) G Kuerten	3	6	6
(Italy) A Gaudenzi	6	3	4
9	(Slovakia) K Kučera	4	4
7	(Slovakia) D Hrbatý	6	6

Quarterfinals
1	(Brazil) G Kuerten	7^{8}	2	0^{r}
7	(Slovakia) D Hrbatý	6^{6}	6	3

==== Section 2 ====
First round
(United States) C Woodruff	5	4
(Belgium) O Rochus	7	6
(Japan) T Suzuki	3	6	6
(United States) K Kim	6	4	3
(United States) J Tarango	4	6	6^{6}
13	(Sweden) J Björkman	6	3	7^{8}
11	(Argentina) M Zabaleta	6^{7}	6	3
Q	(Sweden) K Flygt	7^{9}	3	6
(Spain) Á Calatrava	4	6	2
(Brazil) A Sá	6	0	6
WC	(Japan) G Motomura	4	4
(Germany) D Elsner	6	6

Second round
4	(Ecuador) N Lapentti	7^{8}	7^{7}
(Belgium) O Rochus	6^{6}	6^{4}
(Japan) T Suzuki	6	1	1
13	(Sweden) J Björkman	3	6	6
Q	(Sweden) K Flygt	6	6
(Brazil) A Sá	4	2
(Germany) D Elsner	2	1
6	(Zimbabwe) B Black	6	6

Third round
4	(Ecuador) N Lapentti	4	7	7^{7}
13	(Sweden) J Björkman	6	5	6^{4}
Q	(Sweden) K Flygt	2	3
6	(Zimbabwe) B Black	6	6

Quarterfinals
4	(Ecuador) N Lapentti	6	6
6	(Zimbabwe) B Black	2	2

=== Bottom half ===
==== Section 3 ====
First round
(United States) C Mamiit	6	6
(Australia) J Stoltenberg	3	4
(Spain) S Bruguera	6	6
LL	(United Kingdom) B Cowan	4	3
(Thailand) P Srichaphan	5	7	2
12	(Netherlands) S Schalken	7	5	6
14	(Germany) D Prinosil	6	2	7^{8}
(Russia) M Youzhny	2	6	6^{6}
Q	(South Korea) Y Yoon	6	1	6
(Germany) C Vinck	4	6	2
(Australia) W Arthurs	6	6
WC	(Japan) Y Ishii	3	4

Second round
5	(United States) M Chang	5	4
(United States) C Mamiit	7	6
(Spain) S Bruguera	4	2
12	(Netherlands) S Schalken	6	6
14	(Germany) D Prinosil	6	5	1
Q	(South Korea) Y Yoon	4	7	6
(Australia) W Arthurs	2	5
3	(Australia) M Philippoussis	6	7

Third round
(United States) C Mamiit	2	2
12	(Netherlands) S Schalken	6	6
Q	(South Korea) Y Yoon	6^{7}	4
3	(Australia) M Philippoussis	7^{9}	6

Quarterfinals
12	(Netherlands) S Schalken	6	6
3	(Australia) M Philippoussis	2	3

==== Section 4 ====
First round
(Russia) A Stoliarov	7	1	0
(Switzerland) G Bastl	5	6	6
WC	(Japan) M Onoda	2	3
Q	(Philippines) E Taino	6	6
Q	(United States) V Spadea	6	6
10	(Australia) A Ilie	2	3
15	(Israel) H Levy	5	6	6
Q	(United States) J Salzenstein	7	0	1
(Bulgaria) O Stanoytchev	1	6^{3}
Q	(South Korea) H-T Lee	6	7^{7}
(Zimbabwe) W Black	6	7
(Germany) M Hantschk	3	5

Second round
8	(Morocco) H Arazi	6	5	6
(Switzerland) G Bastl	4	7	4
Q	(Philippines) E Taino	6	7
Q	(United States) V Spadea	3	5
15	(Israel) H Levy	6	6
Q	(South Korea) H-T Lee	2	4
(Zimbabwe) W Black	6	6
LL	(United States) T Dent	4	2

Third round
8	(Morocco) H Arazi	6	6
Q	(Philippines) E Taino	4	2
15	(Israel) H Levy	6^{5}	3
(Zimbabwe) W Black	7^{7}	6

Quarterfinals
8	(Morocco) H Arazi	6^{4}	6	6
(Zimbabwe) W Black	7^{7}	2	2
