= Tennis at the 1998 Asian Games – Women's singles =

Women's singles at the 1998 Asian Games
- Venue: Muang Thong Thani Tennis Centre
- Dates: 12–17 December 1998
- Competitors: 21 from 12 nations

Medalists
gold medal	Yayuk Basuki	Indonesia
silver medal	Tamarine Tanasugarn	Thailand
bronze medal	Yi Jingqian	China
bronze medal	Li Fang	China

Women's singles
- Tennis at the 1998 Asian Games

Events
Singles	men	women
Doubles	men	women	mixed
Team	men	women
- Asian Games

The women's singles tennis event was part of the tennis programme and took place between December 12 and 17, at the Muang Thong Thani Tennis Centre.

== Schedule ==
All times are Indochina Time (UTC+07:00)

Date	Time	Event
Saturday, 12 December 1998	10:00	1st round
Sunday, 13 December 1998	10:00	2nd round
Monday, 14 December 1998	10:00	Quarterfinals
Tuesday, 15 December 1998	10:00	Quarterfinals
Wednesday, 16 December 1998	10:00	Semifinals
Thursday, 17 December 1998	10:00	Final

== Results ==
=== Final ===
Final
1	Tamarine Tanasugarn (THA)	4	2
3	Yayuk Basuki (INA)	6	6

=== Top half ===
1st round
Uzma Khan (IND)	4	1
Maricris Fernandez (PHI)	6	6
Yi Jingqian (CHN)	6	7
Wynne Prakusya (INA)	1	5
Tong Ka Po (HKG)	6	0	2
Irina Selyutina (KAZ)	3	6	6

2nd round
1	Tamarine Tanasugarn (THA)	6	6
Maricris Fernandez (PHI)	3	3
Lilia Biktyakova (UZB)	0	0
6	Yuka Yoshida (JPN)	6	6
4	Wang Shi-ting (TPE)	6^{3}	7	7
Yi Jingqian (CHN)	7^{7}	5	9
Irina Selyutina (KAZ)	7	6
8	Kim Eun-ha (KOR)	5	4

Quarterfinals
1	Tamarine Tanasugarn (THA)	6	6
6	Yuka Yoshida (JPN)	0	4
Yi Jingqian (CHN)	6	6
Irina Selyutina (KAZ)	1	0

Semifinals
1	Tamarine Tanasugarn (THA)	7^{7}	6
Yi Jingqian (CHN)	6^{4}	2

=== Bottom half ===
1st round
Nida Waseem (PAK)	3	2
Tatyana Babina (KAZ)	6	6
Jeon Mi-ra (KOR)	6	6
Suvimol Duangchan (THA)	1	3

2nd round
7	Haruka Inoue (JPN)	4	3
Iroda Tulyaganova (UZB)	6	6
Tatyana Babina (KAZ)	0	0
3	Yayuk Basuki (INA)	6	6
5	Janet Lee (TPE)	4	6^{5}
Nirupama Vaidyanathan (IND)	6	7^{7}
Jeon Mi-ra (KOR)	3	5
2	Li Fang (CHN)	6	7

Quarterfinals
Iroda Tulyaganova (UZB)	3	2
3	Yayuk Basuki (INA)	6	6
Nirupama Vaidyanathan (IND)	2	1
2	Li Fang (CHN)	6	6

Semifinals
3	Yayuk Basuki (INA)	7^{7}	6
2	Li Fang (CHN)	6^{3}	1
