= 2000 Japan Open Tennis Championships – Men's doubles =

Tennis tournament

Men's doubles
- 2000 Japan Open Tennis Championships

Final
- Champion: (India) Mahesh Bhupathi (India) Leander Paes
- Runner-up: (Australia) Michael Hill (United States) Jeff Tarango
- Score: 6–4, 6–7^{(1–7)}, 6–3

Details
- Draw: 28
- Seeds: 8

Events
Singles	men	women
Doubles	men	women
- Japan Open

Jeff Tarango and Daniel Vacek were the defending champions, but Vacek did not compete this year. Tarango teamed up with Michael Hill, but lost in the final to Mahesh Bhupathi and Leander Paes, 4–6, 7–6^{(7–1)}, 3–6.

== Seeds ==
The top four seeds received a bye into the second round.

1. (Australia) Wayne Arthurs / (Slovakia) Dominik Hrbatý (semifinals)
2. (Sweden) Jonas Björkman / (Germany) David Prinosil (quarterfinals)
3. (Zimbabwe) Wayne Black / (Zimbabwe) Kevin Ullyett (quarterfinals)
4. ~~Unknown (withdrew)~~
5. (Australia) Michael Hill / (United States) Jeff Tarango (final)
6. (Zimbabwe) Byron Black / (United States) Jonathan Stark (first round)
7. (Czech Republic) Tomáš Cibulec / (Czech Republic) Leoš Friedl (first round)
8. (Australia) Paul Kilderry / (Australia) Peter Tramacchi (second round)

== Draw ==
Key

- Q = Qualifier
- WC = Wild card
- LL = Lucky loser
- Alt = Alternate
- ITF = ITF entry
- PR = Protected ranking
- SR = Special ranking
- SE = Special exempt
- JE = Junior exempt
- JR = Junior Accelerator Programme entrant
- CO = College Accelerator Programme entrant
- NG = Next Gen Accelerator Program entrant
- w/o = Walkover
- r = Retired
- d = Defaulted

=== Finals ===
Semifinals
1	(Australia) Wayne Arthurs (Slovakia) Dominik Hrbatý	3	7	3
5	(Australia) Michael Hill (United States) Jeff Tarango	6	5	6
Q	(Chile) Nicolás Massú (Brazil) André Sá	3	6	2
(India) Mahesh Bhupathi (India) Leander Paes	6	4	6

Final
5	(Australia) Michael Hill (United States) Jeff Tarango	4	7^{7}	3
(India) Mahesh Bhupathi (India) Leander Paes	6	6^{1}	6

=== Top half ===
First round
(United Kingdom) B Cowan (Russia) A Stoliarov	3	6^{6}
(United States) K Kim (United States) C Mamiit	6	7^{8}
WC	(Japan) G Motomura (Japan) T Suzuki	4	2
(Japan) T Shimada (South Africa) M Wakefield	6	6
LL	(Belgium) C Rochus (Belgium) O Rochus	4	7	6
7	(Czech Republic) T Cibulec (Czech Republic) L Friedl	6	5	4
WC	(Japan) M Onoda (United States) V Spadea	4	2
(Brazil) G Kuerten (Brazil) J Oncins	6	6
(United States) P Goldstein (United States) J Thomas	6	6
(United States) D Bowen (United States) J Waite	2	1
WC	(Japan) Y Ishii (Japan) S Iwabuchi	2	2
5	(Australia) M Hill (United States) J Tarango	6	6

Second round
1	(Australia) W Arthurs (Slovakia) D Hrbatý	w/o
(United States) K Kim (United States) C Mamiit
(Japan) T Shimada (South Africa) M Wakefield	4	2
LL	(Belgium) C Rochus (Belgium) O Rochus	6	6
3	(Zimbabwe) W Black (Zimbabwe) K Ullyett	6	6
(Brazil) G Kuerten (Brazil) J Oncins	3	3
(United States) P Goldstein (United States) J Thomas	4	6	3
5	(Australia) M Hill (United States) J Tarango	6	3	6

Quarterfinals
1	(Australia) W Arthurs (Slovakia) D Hrbatý	6	6
LL	(Belgium) C Rochus (Belgium) O Rochus	1	2
3	(Zimbabwe) W Black (Zimbabwe) K Ullyett	3	4
5	(Australia) M Hill (United States) J Tarango	6	6

Semifinals
1	(Australia) W Arthurs (Slovakia) D Hrbatý	3	7	3
5	(Australia) M Hill (United States) J Tarango	6	5	6

=== Bottom half ===
First round
6	(Zimbabwe) B Black (United States) J Stark	4	3
(South Africa) B Haygarth (Israel) H Levy	6	6
LL	(Italy) G Galimberti (Australia) A Ilie	4	5
(Netherlands) S Schalken (Italy) L Tieleman	6	7
Q	(Morocco) H Arazi (Switzerland) G Bastl	7	6^{7}	5
(Czech Republic) P Pála (Czech Republic) P Vízner	5	7^{9}	7
8	(Australia) P Kilderry (Australia) P Tramacchi	2	6	6
(Spain) Á Calatrava (Brazil) A Prieto	6	3	1
(India) M Bhupathi (India) L Paes	6	6
(United States) E Taino (United States) C Woodruff	4	2
(Italy) A Gaudenzi (Bulgaria) O Stanoytchev	6	2	6
WC	(South Korea) H Lee (South Korea) Y Yoon	3	6	1

Second round
(South Africa) B Haygarth (Israel) H Levy	7	6
(Netherlands) S Schalken (Italy) L Tieleman	5	4
(Czech Republic) P Pála (Czech Republic) P Vízner	3	3
Q	(Chile) N Massú (Brazil) A Sá	6	6
8	(Australia) P Kilderry (Australia) P Tramacchi	4	6	4
(India) M Bhupathi (India) L Paes	6	3	6
(Italy) A Gaudenzi (Bulgaria) O Stanoytchev	6	4	3
2	(Sweden) J Björkman (Germany) D Prinosil	4	6	6

Quarterfinals
(South Africa) B Haygarth (Israel) H Levy	1	7^{7}	3
Q	(Chile) N Massú (Brazil) A Sá	6	6^{1}	6
(India) M Bhupathi (India) L Paes	6	7
2	(Sweden) J Björkman (Germany) D Prinosil	4	5

Semifinals
Q	(Chile) N Massú (Brazil) A Sá	3	6	2
(India) M Bhupathi (India) L Paes	6	4	6
