= Chung Hee-sung =

South Korean tennis player

- Country (sports): South Korea
- Born: 25 November 1976 (age 48)
- Prize money: $20,278

Singles
- Career record: 0–1 (Davis Cup)
- Highest ranking: No. 680 (24 Jun 1996)

Doubles
- Career record: 2–2 (Davis Cup)
- Highest ranking: No. 434 (15 Oct 2001)

Chung Hee-sung (born 25 November 1976) is a South Korean former professional tennis player.

Chung, a graduate of Samil Technical High School in Suwon, began competing on the professional tour in the mid 1990s and reached a best singles world ranking of 680. He was a quarter-finalist at the ATP Challenger tournament in Seoul in 1995. From 2000 to 2003 he represented South Korea in the Davis Cup, featuring mostly in doubles. He won six ITF Futures doubles titles during his career. In 2018 he took over as captain of the South Korea Davis Cup team.

== ITF Futures titles ==
=== Doubles: (6) ===
No.	Date	Tournament	Surface	Partner	Opponents	Score
1.	May 1999	Korea F1, Seoul	Clay	(South Korea) Chung Hee-seok	(South Korea) Han Min-kyu (South Korea) Lee Hyung-taik	6–4, 6–4
2.	Jun 2001	Korea Rep. F1, Seoul	Clay	(South Korea) Song Hyeong-keun	(United States) Diego Ayala (United States) Rafael de Mesa	7–5, 3–6, 6–4
3.	Aug 2001	Chinese Taipei F2 F, Kaohsiung	Hard	(South Korea) Song Hyeong-keun	(Japan) Tetsuya Chaen (Japan) Masahide Sakamoto	6–2, 6–4
4.	Sep 2001	Korea Rep. F3, Cheongju	Clay	(South Korea) Song Hyeong-keun	(Argentina) Roberto Álvarez (France) Jordane Doble	6–3, 6–4
5.	Aug 2002	Korea Rep. F4, Seogwipo	Hard	(South Korea) Chung Hee-seok	(South Korea) Kang Byung-kook (South Korea) Lee Sang-hoon	6–2, 6–2
6.	May 2003	Korea Rep. F1, Cheongju	Clay	(South Korea) Chung Hee-seok	(Finland) Lauri Kiiski (Australia) Brad Weston	4–6, 6–2, 6–3

== See also ==
- List of South Korea Davis Cup team representatives
