= 1995 ATP German Open – Doubles =

Doubles
- 1995 ATP German Open

Final
- Champions: (South Africa) Wayne Ferreira (Russia) Yevgeny Kafelnikov
- Runners-up: (Zimbabwe) Byron Black (Russia) Andrei Olhovskiy
- Score: 6–1, 7–6

Details
- Draw: 28 (4WC/2Q/1LL)
- Seeds: 8

Events
Singles	Doubles
← 1994 ·	Hamburg European Open	· 1996 →

Scott Melville and Piet Norval were the defending champions, but competed this year with different partners. Melville teamed up with Rick Leach and lost in second round to Marc-Kevin Goellner and Tom Kempers, while Norval teamed up with Gary Muller and lost in first round to Wayne Arthurs and Neil Broad.

Wayne Ferreira and Yevgeny Kafelnikov won the title by defeating Byron Black and Andrei Olhovskiy 6–1, 7–6 in the final.

== Seeds ==
The first four seeds received a bye into the second round.

1. (Netherlands) Jacco Eltingh / (Netherlands) Paul Haarhuis (semifinals)
2. (Canada) Grant Connell / (United States) Patrick Galbraith (quarterfinals)
3. (Zimbabwe) Byron Black / (Russia) Andrei Olhovskiy (final)
4. (South Africa) Wayne Ferreira / (Russia) Yevgeny Kafelnikov (champions)
5. (Czech Republic) Cyril Suk / (Czech Republic) Daniel Vacek (first round)
6. (The Bahamas) Mark Knowles / (Canada) Daniel Nestor (first round)
7. (United States) Trevor Kronemann / (Australia) David Macpherson (quarterfinals)
8. (South Africa) Gary Muller / (South Africa) Piet Norval (first round)

== Draw ==
=== Key ===
- Q = Qualifier
- WC = Wild card
- LL = Lucky loser
- Alt = Alternate
- ITF = ITF entry
- PR = Protected ranking
- SR = Special ranking
- SE = Special exempt
- JE = Junior exempt
- JR = Junior Accelerator Programme entrant
- CO = College Accelerator Programme entrant
- NG = Next Gen Accelerator Program entrant
- w/o = Walkover
- r = Retired
- d = Defaulted

=== Finals ===
Semifinals
1	(Netherlands) Jacco Eltingh (Netherlands) Paul Haarhuis	2	6
3	(Zimbabwe) Byron Black (Russia) Andrei Olhovskiy	6	7
4	(South Africa) Wayne Ferreira (Russia) Yevgeny Kafelnikov	6	6
(Australia) Wayne Arthurs (United Kingdom) Neil Broad	3	2

Final
3	(Zimbabwe) Byron Black (Russia) Andrei Olhovskiy	1	6
4	(South Africa) Wayne Ferreira (Russia) Yevgeny Kafelnikov	6	7

=== Top half ===
First round
WC	(Germany) B Karbacher (Germany) M Zoecke	7	6
(Australia) J Ireland (Belgium) L Pimek	5	4
WC	(Germany) J Knippschild (Germany) N Kiefer	3	4
WC	(Germany) M Stich (Germany) M Sinner	6	6
LL	(Australia) S Draper (Australia) P Tramacchi	2	3
7	(United States) T Kronemann (Australia) D Macpherson	6	6
WC	(Germany) D Prinosil (Germany) J Renzenbrink	5	6
(Australia) J Eagle (Australia) A Florent	7	7
(South Africa) E Ferreira (Netherlands) S Noteboom	4	4
(Germany) MK Goellner (Netherlands) T Kempers	6	6
(United States) R Leach (United States) S Melville	6	7
6	(The Bahamas) M Knowles (Canada) D Nestor	3	6

Second round
1	(Netherlands) J Eltingh (Netherlands) P Haarhuis	7	6
WC	(Germany) B Karbacher (Germany) M Zoecke	6	3
WC	(Germany) M Stich (Germany) M Sinner	3	4
7	(United States) T Kronemann (Australia) D Macpherson	6	6
3	(Zimbabwe) B Black (Russia) A Olhovskiy	6	1	6
(Australia) J Eagle (Australia) A Florent	3	6	3
(Germany) MK Goellner (Netherlands) T Kempers	7	7
(United States) R Leach (United States) S Melville	5	6

Quarterfinals
1	(Netherlands) J Eltingh (Netherlands) P Haarhuis	3	7	7
7	(United States) T Kronemann (Australia) D Macpherson	6	5	6
3	(Zimbabwe) B Black (Russia) A Olhovskiy	6	6
(Germany) MK Goellner (Netherlands) T Kempers	3	4

Semifinals
1	(Netherlands) J Eltingh (Netherlands) P Haarhuis	2	6
3	(Zimbabwe) B Black (Russia) A Olhovskiy	6	7

=== Bottom half ===
First round
5	(Czech Republic) C Suk (Czech Republic) D Vacek	2	5
(Netherlands) M Oosting (Australia) P Rafter	6	7
(Sweden) H Holm (Sweden) P Nyborg	6	2
(Czech Republic) V Flégl (South Africa) B Haygarth	7	6
Q	(Ukraine) D Poliakov (France) F Santoro	6	6
Q	(Germany) Helge Capell (Germany) A von Hugo	3	3
8	(South Africa) G Muller (South Africa) P Norval	3	6	3
(Australia) W Arthurs (United Kingdom) N Broad	6	3	6
(United States) M Bauer (Netherlands) T Nijssen	6	6	4
(Spain) T Carbonell (Netherlands) J Siemerink	4	7	6
(South Africa) L Bale (South Africa) JL de Jager	6	5	4
(Argentina) L Lobo (Spain) J Sánchez	2	7	6

Second round
(Netherlands) M Oosting (Australia) P Rafter	6	7
(Czech Republic) V Flégl (South Africa) B Haygarth	4	5
Q	(Ukraine) D Poliakov (France) F Santoro	3	4
4	(South Africa) W Ferreira (Russia) Y Kafelnikov	6	6
(Australia) W Arthurs (United Kingdom) N Broad	w/o
(Spain) T Carbonell (Netherlands) J Siemerink
(Argentina) L Lobo (Spain) J Sánchez	7	4	4
2	(Canada) G Connell (United States) P Galbraith	6	6	6

Quarterfinals
(Netherlands) M Oosting (Australia) P Rafter	6	0
4	(South Africa) W Ferreira (Russia) Y Kafelnikov	7	6
(Australia) W Arthurs (United Kingdom) N Broad	7	6
2	(Canada) G Connell (United States) P Galbraith	5	2

Semifinals
4	(South Africa) W Ferreira (Russia) Y Kafelnikov	6	6
(Australia) W Arthurs (United Kingdom) N Broad	3	2

== Qualifying ==
=== Qualifying seeds ===
1. (Italy) Andrea Gaudenzi / (Croatia) Goran Ivanišević (qualifying competition)
2. (Australia) Scott Draper / (Australia) Peter Tramacchi (qualifying competition, lucky losers)
3. (Romania) Alexandru Rădulescu / (Germany) Arne Thoms (first round)
4. (Ukraine) Dimitri Poliakov / (France) Fabrice Santoro (qualified)

=== Qualifiers ===
1. (Ukraine) Dimitri Poliakov / (France) Fabrice Santoro
2. (Germany) Helge Capell / (Germany) Alexander von Hugo

=== Lucky losers ===
1. (Australia) Scott Draper / (Australia) Peter Tramacchi

=== Qualifying draw ===
==== First qualifier ====
First round
1	(Italy) Andrea Gaudenzi (Croatia) Goran Ivanišević	6	6
WC	(Brazil) Gustavo Kuerten (Ecuador) Luis Morejón	3	1
WC	(Chile) Gabriel Silberstein (Peru) Jaime Yzaga	6	3
4	(Ukraine) Dimitri Poliakov (France) Fabrice Santoro	7	6

Qualifying competition
1	(Italy) Andrea Gaudenzi (Croatia) Goran Ivanišević	6	6	4
4	(Ukraine) Dimitri Poliakov (France) Fabrice Santoro	2	7	6

==== Second qualifier ====
First round
2	(Australia) Scott Draper (Australia) Peter Tramacchi	6	5	6
(Argentina) Marcelo Charpentier (Czech Republic) Petr Pála	3	7	4
WC	(Germany) Helge Capell (Germany) Alexander von Hugo	7	5	7
3	(Romania) Alexandru Rădulescu (Germany) Arne Thoms	6	7	6

Qualifying competition
2	(Australia) Scott Draper (Australia) Peter Tramacchi	6	6	4
WC	(Germany) Helge Capell (Germany) Alexander von Hugo	7	1	6
