= Pavel Kudrnáč =

Czech tennis player (born 1974)

- Full name: Pavel Kudrnáč
- Country (sports): Czech Republic
- Born: 11 February 1974 (age 51)
- Prize money: $46,869

Singles
- Highest ranking: No. 561 (5 July 1999)

Doubles
- Career record: 2–11
- Career titles: 0
- Highest ranking: No. 111 (16 October 2000)

Grand Slam doubles results
- US Open: 1R (2000)
Medal record
Summer Universiade
Gold medal – first place	1999 Majorca	Men's doubles
Silver medal – second place	1997 Sicily	Men's singles
Silver medal – second place	1997 Sicily	Men's doubles
Silver medal – second place	2001 Beijing	Men's doubles

Pavel Kudrnáč (born 11 February 1974) is a former professional tennis player from the Czech Republic.

== Biography ==
As a junior, Kudrnáč competed in the boys singles and doubles events at the 1992 French Open.

He was a leading collegiate player during his time at Oklahoma State. In 1998 he topped the ITA rankings and was honoured with the Senior Player of the Year award.

Kudrnáč, who comes from Plzeň, represented the Czech Republic in multiple editions of the Summer Universiade, most notably at the 1999 event, where he was a gold medalist in the men's doubles.

On the professional tour he was a doubles specialist and regularly partnered fellow Czech Petr Kovačka. With the exception of his first tournament, the 1995 Prague Open with Petr Luxa, he played beside Kovačka in all of his ATP Tour appearances, which included making the semi-finals at San Marino in 2000. They competed in the 2000 US Open, beaten in the first round by Argentina's Gastón Etlis and Sebastián Prieto. At Challenger level, the pair won a total of three doubles titles.

== Challenger titles ==
=== Doubles: (3) ===
No.	Year	Tournament	Surface	Partner	Opponents	Score
1.	1999	Prague, Czech Republic	Clay	(Czech Republic) Petr Kovačka	(Czech Republic) Petr Dezort (Czech Republic) Leoš Friedl	6–0, 6–1
2.	2000	Wrocław, Poland	Hard	(Czech Republic) Petr Kovačka	(Canada) Jocelyn Robichaud (United Kingdom) Kyle Spencer	3–6, 7–6^{(6)}, 6–4
3.	2000	Barletta, Italy	Clay	(Czech Republic) Petr Kovačka	(Romania) Dinu Pescariu (Italy) Vincenzo Santopadre	6–7^{(4)}, 6–2, 6–0
