= 2000 Japan Open Tennis Championships =

- Date: 9–15 October
- Edition: 27th
- Category: International Series Gold (men); Tier III (women)
- Prize money: $800,000 (men) $170,000 (women)
- Surface: Hard / outdoor
- Location: Tokyo, Japan
- Venue: Ariake Coliseum

Champions

Men's singles
- (Netherlands) Sjeng Schalken

Women's singles
- (France) Julie Halard-Decugis

Men's doubles
- (India) Mahesh Bhupathi / (India) Leander Paes

Women's doubles
- (France) Julie Halard-Decugis / (United States) Corina Morariu
- Japan Open

The 2000 Japan Open Tennis Championships was a tennis tournament played on outdoor hard courts at the Ariake Coliseum in Tokyo, Japan that was part of the International Series Gold of the 2000 ATP Tour and of Tier III of the 2000 WTA Tour. It was the 27th edition of the tournament and was held from 9 October until 15 October 2000. Sjeng Schalken and Julie Halard-Decugis won the singles titles.

== Finals ==
=== Men's singles ===
(Netherlands) Sjeng Schalken defeated (Ecuador) Nicolás Lapentti, 6–4, 3–6, 6–1

- It was Schalken's only singles title of the year and the 5th of his career.

=== Women's singles ===
(France) Julie Halard-Decugis defeated (United States) Amy Frazier, 5–7, 7–5, 6–4

- It was Halard-Decugis' 2nd and last singles title of the year and the 12th and last of her career.

=== Men's doubles ===
(India) Mahesh Bhupathi / (India) Leander Paes defeated (Australia) Michael Hill / (United States) Jeff Tarango, 6–4, 6–7^{(1–7)}, 6–3

=== Women's doubles ===
(France) Julie Halard-Decugis / (United States) Corina Morariu defeated (Slovenia) Tina Križan / (Slovenia) Katarina Srebotnik, 6–1, 6–2
