= Tennis at the 1999 Summer Universiade =

Tennis events were contested at the 1999 Summer Universiade in Palma de Majorca, Spain.

== Medal summary ==
| Event | Gold | Silver | Bronze |
|---|---|---|---|
| Men's Singles | Lee Hyung-taik (KOR) | Albert Portas (ESP) | Lee Seung-hoon (KOR) |
| Men's Singles | Lee Hyung-taik (KOR) | Albert Portas (ESP) | Slimane Saoudi (FRA) |
| Men's Doubles | Pavel Kudrnáč and Jan Vacek (CZE) | Helge Capell and Alexander von Hugo (GER) | Marc Gicquel and Slimane Saoudi (FRA) |
| Men's Doubles | Pavel Kudrnáč and Jan Vacek (CZE) | Helge Capell and Alexander von Hugo (GER) | Michihisa Onoda and Norikazu Sugiyama (JPN) |
| Women's Singles | Janet Lee (TPE) | Wang Shi-ting (TPE) | Zuzana Lešenarová (CZE) |
| Women's Singles | Janet Lee (TPE) | Wang Shi-ting (TPE) | Andrea Šebová (SVK) |
| Women's Doubles | Janet Lee and Wang Shi-ting (TPE) | Katarzyna Teodorowicz and Anna Żarska (POL) | Seiko Okamoto and Ryoko Takemura (JPN) |
| Women's Doubles | Janet Lee and Wang Shi-ting (TPE) | Katarzyna Teodorowicz and Anna Żarska (POL) | Patrícia Marková and Andrea Šebová (SVK) |
| Mixed Doubles | Kim Eun-ha and Kim Dong-hyun (KOR) | Wang Shi-ting and Lin Bing-chao (TPE) | Ding Ding and Zhu Benqiang (CHN) |
| Mixed Doubles | Kim Eun-ha and Kim Dong-hyun (KOR) | Wang Shi-ting and Lin Bing-chao (TPE) | Seiko Okamoto and Michihisa Onoda (JPN) |

== Medal table ==
| Rank | Nation | Gold | Silver | Bronze | Total |
|---|---|---|---|---|---|
| 1 | Chinese Taipei (TPE) | 2 | 2 | 0 | 4 |
| 2 | South Korea (KOR) | 2 | 0 | 1 | 3 |
| 3 | Czech Republic (CZE) | 1 | 0 | 1 | 2 |
| 4 | Germany (GER) | 0 | 1 | 0 | 1 |
| 4 | Poland (POL) | 0 | 1 | 0 | 1 |
| 4 | Spain (ESP) | 0 | 1 | 0 | 1 |
| 7 | Japan (JPN) | 0 | 0 | 3 | 3 |
| 8 | France (FRA) | 0 | 0 | 2 | 2 |
| 8 | Slovakia (SVK) | 0 | 0 | 2 | 2 |
| 10 | China (CHN) | 0 | 0 | 1 | 1 |
| Totals (10 entries) | | 5 | 5 | 10 | 20 |

== See also ==
- Tennis at the Summer Universiade
