= 2000 Japan Open Tennis Championships – Women's singles =

Women's singles
- 2000 Japan Open Tennis Championships

Final
- Champion: (France) Julie Halard-Decugis
- Runner-up: (United States) Amy Frazier
- Score: 5–7, 7–5, 6–4

Details
- Draw: 30 (4Q / 2WC)
- Seeds: 8

Events
Singles	men	women
Doubles	men	women
- Japan Open

Second-seeded Amy Frazier was the defending champion but lost in the final 5–7, 7–5, 6–4 against first-seeded Julie Halard-Decugis. This was Halard-Decugis's final career singles title, as she retired from professional tennis at the end of the season. She also won both the singles and doubles titles at the tournament.

== Seeds ==
The top two seeds received a bye into the second round.

1. (France) Julie Halard-Decugis (champion)
2. (United States) Amy Frazier (final)
3. (United States) Kristina Brandi (second round, retired)
4. (Colombia) Fabiola Zuluaga (second round)
5. (Thailand) Tamarine Tanasugarn (semifinals)
6. (Italy) Tathiana Garbin (first round, retired)
7. (Argentina) Paola Suárez (second round)
8. (Israel) Anna Smashnova (first round)

== Draw ==
Key

- Q = Qualifier
- WC = Wild card
- LL = Lucky loser
- Alt = Alternate
- ITF = ITF entry
- PR = Protected ranking
- SR = Special ranking
- SE = Special exempt
- JE = Junior exempt
- JR = Junior Accelerator Programme entrant
- CO = College Accelerator Programme entrant
- NG = Next Gen Accelerator Program entrant
- w/o = Walkover
- r = Retired
- d = Defaulted

=== Finals ===
Semifinals
1	(France) Julie Halard-Decugis	7^{7}	6
5	(Thailand) Tamarine Tanasugarn	6^{5}	0
(South Africa) Joannette Kruger	5	2
2	(United States) Amy Frazier	7	6

Final
1	(France) Julie Halard-Decugis	5	7	6
2	(United States) Amy Frazier	7	5	4

=== Top half ===
First round
(Japan) S Asagoe	4	6	6
WC	(Japan) R Fujiwara	6	4	1
(Hungary) R Kuti-Kis	6	6
(Australia) N Pratt	1	2
Q	(Switzerland) M Vavrinec	6	7^{7}
8	(Israel) A Smashnova	1	6^{4}
3	(United States) K Brandi	6	6
(United States) T Almeda-Singian	2	0
WC	(Japan) S Obata	6^{6}	1
Q	(United States) T Snyder	7^{8}	6
(United States) L Osterloh	7	7
(Czech Republic) D Bedanova	5	5
Q	(Uzbekistan) I Tulyaganova	3	2
5	(Thailand) T Tanasugarn	6	6

Second round
1	(France) J Halard-Decugis	6	3	7
(Japan) S Asagoe	2	6	5
(Hungary) R Kuti-Kis	3	6^{5}
Q	(Switzerland) M Vavrinec	6	7^{7}
3	(United States) K Brandi	2	5^{r}
Q	(United States) T Snyder	6	6
(United States) L Osterloh	3	1
5	(Thailand) T Tanasugarn	6	6

Quarterfinals
1	(France) J Halard-Decugis	3	6	6
Q	(Switzerland) M Vavrinec	6	2	0
Q	(United States) T Snyder	4	1
5	(Thailand) T Tanasugarn	6	6

Semifinals
1	(France) J Halard-Decugis	7^{7}	6
5	(Thailand) T Tanasugarn	6^{5}	0

=== Bottom half ===
First round
7	(Argentina) P Suárez	6	6
(Japan) Y Yoshida	4	4
(United States) M Shaughnessy	7	2	0
(South Africa) J Kruger	5	6	6
(Indonesia) Y Basuki	6	3	2
Q	(Chinese Taipei) J Lee	4	6	6
(Italy) R Grande	6	3	5
4	(Colombia) F Zuluaga	4	6	7
6	(Italy) T Garbin	2^{r}
(Austria) S Plischke	5
(Spain) Á Montolio	2	0^{r}
(Indonesia) W Prakusya	6	1
(United States) C Morariu	6	7
(Spain) M Marrero	3	5

Second round
7	(Argentina) P Suárez	6^{5}	6^{0}
(South Africa) J Kruger	7^{7}	7^{7}
Q	(Chinese Taipei) J Lee	6	7
4	(Colombia) F Zuluaga	4	5
(Austria) S Plischke	6	6^{2}	6
(Indonesia) W Prakusya	3	7^{7}	3
(United States) C Morariu	6^{5}	6^{3}
2	(United States) A Frazier	7^{7}	7^{7}

Quarterfinals
(South Africa) J Kruger	6	7^{7}
Q	(Chinese Taipei) J Lee	3	6^{5}
(Austria) S Plischke	1	2
2	(United States) A Frazier	6	6

Semifinals
(South Africa) J Kruger	5	2
2	(United States) A Frazier	7	6
