= 2000 Japan Open Tennis Championships – Women's doubles =

Women's doubles
- 2000 Japan Open Tennis Championships

Final
- Champion: (France) Julie Halard-Decugis (United States) Corina Morariu
- Runner-up: (Slovenia) Tina Križan (Slovenia) Katarina Srebotnik
- Score: 6–1, 6–2

Details
- Draw: 16 (1Q / 1WC)
- Seeds: 4

Events
| Singles | men | women |
| Doubles | men | women |
- Japan Open

Corina Morariu and Kimberly Po were the defending champions, but Po did not compete this year. Morariu teamed up with Julie Halard-Decugis, and won in the final 6–1, 6–2 against Tina Križan and Katarina Srebotnik.

This was Halard-Decugis's second consecutive title following the Toyota Princess Cup the previous week, as she swept both the singles and doubles titles at the tournament.

== Seeds ==
1. (France) Julie Halard-Decugis / (United States) Corina Morariu (champion)
2. (Japan) Nana Smith / (Argentina) Paola Suárez (semifinals)
3. (Slovenia) Tina Križan / (Slovenia) Katarina Srebotnik (final)
4. (Italy) Rita Grande / (United States) Meghann Shaughnessy (semifinals)

== Draw ==
Key

- Q = Qualifier
- WC = Wild card
- LL = Lucky loser
- Alt = Alternate
- ITF = ITF entry
- PR = Protected ranking
- SR = Special ranking
- SE = Special exempt
- JE = Junior exempt
- JR = Junior Accelerator Programme entrant
- CO = College Accelerator Programme entrant
- NG = Next Gen Accelerator Program entrant
- w/o = Walkover
- r = Retired
- d = Defaulted

=== Draw ===
First round
1 | (France) J Halard-Decugis (United States) C Morariu | 6 | 7
(Indonesia) Y Basuki (Thailand) T Tanasugarn | 0 | 5
(South Africa) E de Villiers (Uzbekistan) I Tulyaganova | 6 | 4 | 4
LL | (Japan) H Inoue (Japan) M Inoue | 0 | 6 | 6
4 | (Italy) R Grande (United States) M Shaughnessy | 6 | 6
(South Korea) E-H Kim (South Africa) J Kruger | 2 | 1
WC | (Japan) S Hisamatsu (Japan) S Obata | 1 | 2
(Japan) S Asagoe (Japan) Y Kaneko | 6 | 6
(Australia) T Musgrave (Australia) B Stewart | 6^{5} | 2
(United States) A Frazier (United States) K Schlukebir | 7^{7} | 6
(United States) T Snyder (Canada) V Webb | 1 | 1
3 | (Slovenia) T Križan (Slovenia) K Srebotnik | 6 | 6
Q | (Chinese Taipei) J Lee (Indonesia) W Prakusya | 7^{8} | 6
(Australia) A Ellwood (Japan) R Hiraki | 6^{6} | 0
(United States) L Osterloh (Australia) N Pratt | 3 | 7^{7} | 6^{8}
2 | (Japan) N Smith (Argentina) P Suárez | 6 | 6^{3} | 7^{10}

Quarterfinals
1 | (France) J Halard-Decugis (United States) C Morariu | 6^{4} | 6 | 6
LL | (Japan) H Inoue (Japan) M Inoue | 7^{7} | 2 | 1
4 | (Italy) R Grande (United States) M Shaughnessy | 6 | 3 | 6
(Japan) S Asagoe (Japan) Y Kaneko | 4 | 6 | 2
(United States) A Frazier (United States) K Schlukebir | 6 | 3 | 2
3 | (Slovenia) T Križan (Slovenia) K Srebotnik | 4 | 6 | 6
Q | (Chinese Taipei) J Lee (Indonesia) W Prakusya | 3 | 3
2 | (Japan) N Smith (Argentina) P Suárez | 6 | 6

Semifinals
1 | (France) J Halard-Decugis (United States) C Morariu | 6 | 6
4 | (Italy) R Grande (United States) M Shaughnessy | 3 | 1
3 | (Slovenia) T Križan (Slovenia) K Srebotnik | 6 | 6^{5} | 6
2 | (Japan) N Smith (Argentina) P Suárez | 2 | 7^{7} | 4

Final
1 | (France) J Halard-Decugis (United States) C Morariu | 6 | 6
3 | (Slovenia) T Križan (Slovenia) K Srebotnik | 1 | 2
