= Tennis at the 1997 Summer Universiade =

Tennis events were contested at the 1997 Summer Universiade in the island of Sicily, Italy.

== Medal summary ==
Event	Gold	Silver	Bronze
Men's Singles	Yoon Yong-il (KOR)	Pavel Kudrnáč (CZE)	Lin Bing-chao (TPE)
Men's Singles	Yoon Yong-il (KOR)	Pavel Kudrnáč (CZE)	Alexander von Hugo (GER)
Men's Doubles	Lee Hyung-taik and Yoon Yong-il (KOR)	Martin Dvořáček and Pavel Kudrnáč (CZE)	Massimo Calvelli and Lorenzo Pennisi (ITA)
Men's Doubles	Lee Hyung-taik and Yoon Yong-il (KOR)	Martin Dvořáček and Pavel Kudrnáč (CZE)	Vladimir Lys and Aleksandr Yarmola (UKR)
Women's Singles	Wang Shi-ting (TPE)	Nathalie Callen (FRA)	Jeon Mi-ra (KOR)
Women's Singles	Wang Shi-ting (TPE)	Nathalie Callen (FRA)	Germana Di Natale (ITA)
Women's Doubles	Wang Shi-ting and Hsu Hsueh-li (TPE)	Magdalena Feistel and Katarzyna Teodorowicz (POL)	Shinobu Asagoe and Seiko Okamoto (JPN)
Women's Doubles	Wang Shi-ting and Hsu Hsueh-li (TPE)	Magdalena Feistel and Katarzyna Teodorowicz (POL)	Patrícia Marková and Martina Ombrejková (SVK)
Mixed Doubles	Jeon Mi-ra and Kim Dong-hyun (KOR)	Wang Shi-ting and Lin Bing-chao (TPE)	Claudia Timm and Alexander von Hugo (GER)
Mixed Doubles	Jeon Mi-ra and Kim Dong-hyun (KOR)	Wang Shi-ting and Lin Bing-chao (TPE)	Patrícia Marková and Erik Csarnakovics (SVK)

== Medal table ==
Rank	Nation	Gold	Silver	Bronze	Total
1	South Korea (KOR)	3	0	1	4
2	Chinese Taipei (TPE)	2	1	1	4
3	Czech Republic (CZE)	0	2	0	2
4	France (FRA)	0	1	0	1
4	Poland (POL)	0	1	0	1
6	Germany (GER)	0	0	2	2
6	Italy (ITA)	0	0	2	2
6	Slovakia (SVK)	0	0	2	2
9	Japan (JPN)	0	0	1	1
9	Ukraine (UKR)	0	0	1	1
Totals (10 entries)		5	5	10	20

== See also ==
- Tennis at the Summer Universiade
