= Song Hyeong-keun =

South Korean tennis player

- Country (sports): South Korea
- Born: 16 September 1974 (age 51)
- Height: 173 cm (5 ft 8 in)
- Prize money: $13,311

Singles
- Career record: 0–3
- Highest ranking: No. 330 (13 Sep 1993)

Grand Slam singles results
- Australian Open: Q1 (1994, 1995, 1996)

Doubles
- Highest ranking: No. 470 (15 Oct 2001)
Medal record
Asian Games
Gold medal – first place	1998 Bangkok	Men's team

Song Hyeong-keun (born 16 September 1974) is a South Korean former professional tennis player.

An Australian Open junior semi-finalist, Song had a best career singles ranking of 330 in the world and made his only ATP Tour main draw appearance at the 1992 Seoul Open.

Song was a men's team gold medalist at the 1998 Asian Games in Bangkok.

In 1999 he represented the South Korea Davis Cup team in a tie against New Zealand in Christchurch and played in two singles rubbers. This included the deciding fifth rubber, which he lost in four sets to Mark Nielsen.

Short in stature, Song had a game which was built around his two-handed backhand.

== Performance timeline ==
Key
W	F	SF	QF	#R	RR	Q#	DNQ	A	NH

(W) winner; (F) finalist; (SF) semifinalist; (QF) quarterfinalist; (#R) rounds 4, 3, 2, 1; (RR) round-robin stage; (Q#) qualification round; (DNQ) did not qualify; (A) absent; (NH) not held; (SR) strike rate (events won / competed); (W–L) win–loss record.

=== Singles ===
Tournament	1994	1995	1996	W–L	Win %
Grand Slam tournaments
Australian Open	Q1	Q1	Q1	0–0	–
French Open	A	A	A	0–0	–
Wimbledon	A	A	A	0–0	–
US Open				0–0	–
Win–loss			0–0	0–0	–

== ITF Futures titles ==
=== Doubles: (3) ===
No.	Date	Tournament	Surface	Partner	Opponents	Score
1.	Jun 2001	Korea F1, Seoul	Clay	(South Korea) Chung Hee-sung	(United States) Diego Ayala (United States) Rafael de Mesa	7–5, 3–6, 6–4
2.	Aug 2001	Chinese Taipei F2, Kaohsiung	Hard	(South Korea) Chung Hee-sung	(Japan) Tetsuya Chaen (Japan) Masahide Sakamoto	6–2, 6–4
3.	Sep 2001	Korea F3, Cheongju	Clay	(South Korea) Chung Hee-sung	(Argentina) Roberto Álvarez (France) Jordane Doble	6–3, 6–4

== See also ==
- List of South Korea Davis Cup team representatives
