= Alexander von Hugo =

German tennis player

- Country (sports): Germany

Singles
- Highest ranking: No. 814 (4 Oct 1993)

Doubles
- Career record: 0–1
- Highest ranking: No. 624 (15 May 1995)
Medal record
Summer Universiade
Silver medal – second place	1999 Majorca	Men's Doubles
Bronze medal – third place	1997 Sicily	Men's Singles
Bronze medal – third place	1997 Sicily	Mixed Doubles

Alexander von Hugo is a German former professional tennis player. He had a good record competing at the Summer Universiade, winning three medals for his country, including a singles bronze medal in Sicily in 1997.

Active on the professional tour in the 1990s, von Hugo made his only ATP Tour main draw appearance at the 1995 German Open in Hamburg, where he partnered Helge Capell in the doubles. He also featured in the qualifying draw for the singles and won his first match, over Sascha Schewiola.
