= 1995 Seoul Open =

- Date: April 24 – April 30
- Edition: 9th
- Category: World Series
- Draw: 32S / 16D
- Prize money: $203,000
- Surface: Hard / outdoor
- Location: Seoul, South Korea

Champions

Singles
- (Canada) Greg Rusedski

Doubles
- (Canada) Sébastien Lareau / (United States) Jeff Tarango
| ← 1994 · | Seoul Open | · 1996 → |

The 1995 Seoul Open was a men's tennis tournament played on outdoor hard courts in Seoul in South Korea. The event was part of the World Series of the 1995 ATP Tour. It was the ninth edition of the tournament and was held from April 24 through April 30, 1995. Eighth-seeded Greg Rusedski won the singles title. This was the last tournament title of Rusedski as a Canadian player.

== Finals ==
=== Singles ===
(Canada) Greg Rusedski defeated (Germany) Lars Rehmann 6–4, 3–1 (Rehmann retired)

- It was Rusedski's only title of the year and the 3rd of his career.

=== Doubles ===
(Canada) Sébastien Lareau / (United States) Jeff Tarango defeated (Australia) Joshua Eagle / (Australia) Andrew Florent 6–3, 6–2

- It was Lareau's 1st title of the year and the 1st of his career. It was Tarango's 1st title of the year and the 3rd of his career.
