= Lee Sang-hoon (tennis) =

South Korean tennis player

- Country (sports): South Korea
- Born: 20 September 1972 (age 52)
- Height: 181 cm (5 ft 11 in)
- Prize money: $12,994

Singles
- Career record: 0–1
- Highest ranking: No. 397 (5 Aug 1996)

Grand Slam singles results
- Australian Open: Q1 (1995)

Doubles
- Highest ranking: No. 603 (20 Jun 1994)

Lee Sang-hoon (Korean: 이상훈; born 20 September 1972) is a South Korean former professional tennis player.

Lee, a graduate of Konkuk University, spent his career competing mostly at satellite and Futures level. He featured in the qualifying draw for the 1995 Australian Open and was a quarter-finalist at the 1995 Seoul Challenger. In 1996 he made an ATP Tour main draw appearance at the Korea Open, where he fell in the first round to top seed Byron Black.

== ITF Futures titles ==
=== Doubles: (2) ===
No.	Date	Tournament	Surface	Partner	Opponents	Score
1.	May 1998	Korea F1, Sogwipo	Hard	(South Korea) Han Min-kyu	(Chinese Taipei) Chen Chih-jung (Indonesia) Andrian Raturandang	6–2, 6–4
2.	Jun 2000	Korea F2, Seoul	Clay	(South Korea) Sohn Seung-ri	(South Korea) Chung Seong-yoon (South Korea) Han Min-kyu	6–3, 6–7^{(6)}, 6–3
