= 1996 KAL Cup Korea Open =

Men's tennis tournament

- Date: 22–28 April
- Edition: 10th
- Category: World Series
- Draw: 32S / 16D
- Prize money: $203,000
- Surface: Hard / outdoor
- Location: Seoul, South Korea
- Venue: Seoul Olympic Park Tennis Center

Champions

Singles
- (Zimbabwe) Byron Black

Doubles
- (United States) Rick Leach / (United States) Jonathan Stark
← 1995 ·	KAL Cup Korea Open

The 1996 KAL Cup Korea Open was a men's tennis tournament played on outdoor hard courts at the Seoul Olympic Park Tennis Center in Seoul in South Korea and was part of the World Series of the 1996 ATP Tour. It was the tenth and last edition of the tournament and was held from 22 April through 28 April 1996. First-seeded Byron Black won the singles title.

== Finals ==
=== Singles ===
(Zimbabwe) Byron Black defeated (Czech Republic) Martin Damm 7–6^{(7–3)}, 6–3

- It was Black's 2nd title of the year and the 14th of his career.

=== Doubles ===
(United States) Rick Leach / (United States) Jonathan Stark defeated (United States) Kent Kinnear / (South Africa) Kevin Ullyett 6–4, 6–4

- It was Leach's 3rd title of the year and the 34th of his career. It was Stark's 1st title of the year and the 17th of his career.
