= Han Min-kyu =

South Korean tennis player

- Country (sports): South Korea
- Born: 31 March 1973 (age 52)

Singles
- Career record: 0–1
- Highest ranking: No. 742 (29 July 1996)

Doubles
- Career record: 0–1
- Highest ranking: No. 679 (7 June 1999)

Han Min-kyu (born 31 March 1973) is a South Korean former professional tennis player.

With a career high singles world ranking of 742, Han featured mainly at satellite/Futures level and outside of tennis was a student at Soonchunhyang University.

Han made his only ATP Tour main draw appearance as a wildcard at the 1996 Korea Open in Seoul and was beaten in the first round by Italy's Gianluca Pozzi.

== ITF Futures titles ==
=== Doubles: (1) ===
No.	Date	Tournament	Surface	Partner	Opponents	Score
1.	May 1998	Korea F1, Sogwipo	Hard	(South Korea) Lee Sang-hoon	(Chinese Taipei) Chen Chih-jung (Indonesia) Andrian Raturandang	6–2, 6–4
