= Nirupama Sanjeev =

Indian tennis player

- Sanjeev with Rohan Bopanna at the 2010 Commonwealth Games in New Delhi, October 2010.
- Country (sports): India
- Residence: San Francisco Bay Area, United States
- Born: 8 December 1976 (age 49) Coimbatore, India
- Height: 1.70 m (5 ft 7 in)
- Turned pro: 1992
- Retired: 2010
- Plays: Right (two-handed backhand)
- Prize money: $182,057
- Official website: www.nirustennis.com

Singles
- Career record: 180–155
- Career titles: 2 ITF
- Highest ranking: No. 134 (7 July 1997)

Grand Slam singles results
- Australian Open: 2R (1998)
- French Open: Q2 (2001)
- Wimbledon: Q3 (2001)
- US Open: Q3 (1999)

Doubles
- Career record: 106–94
- Career titles: 10 ITF
- Highest ranking: No. 115 (23 July 2001)

Grand Slam doubles results
- Australian Open: 1R (1998, 2001)
- French Open: 1R (2001)
- Wimbledon: 2R (2001)
- US Open: Q1 (1997, 2001)

Other doubles tournaments
- Olympic Games: 1R (2000)
Medal record
Representing India
Women's tennis
Asian Games
Bronze medal – third place	1998 Bangkok	Mixed doubles

Nirupama Sanjeev (née Vaidyanathan; born 8 December 1976) is an Indian former professional tennis player. In the 1998 Australian Open, Sanjeev became the second Indian woman (after Nirupama Mankad) in the Open era to feature in a major main draw, the first one in singles, and the first to win a major match, defeating Gloria Pizzichini. She also won the bronze medal at the 1998 Bangkok Asian Games in mixed doubles, partnering Mahesh Bhupathi. Sanjeev was the first Indian woman to enter the top 200 of the rankings in singles. She founded Nirus Tennis Academy in 2004 and now does consultations about tennis on https://tennisconsultation.com. She also wrote her memoir "The Moonballer" which was released by tennis legend Vijay Amritraj in 2013 https://www.amazon.com/s?k=the+moonballer&crid=23XAD8E1KYPAY&sprefix=the+moonballer%2Caps%2C182&ref=nb_sb_noss

== Early life ==
Nirupama was born in the Southern Indian town of Coimbatore. She started playing tennis at the age of 5 and was influenced very much by her brother. Her father K.S. Vaidyanathan was a cricketer who had played for Tamil Nadu in Ranji Cricket tournament; he coached her at the start of her career. Her first tennis tournament foray was the National Under 12 tournament, where she reached the semi-final and went on to win her 1st National title in Under 14 age group at the age of 13. One year later in 1991, she won the National Women's title at age 14 and also won the National Women's title in 1992–1996.

== Professional ==
In 1996, she moved to Luxembourg and she turned professional at the age of 18. She player her first WTA Tour-level tournament in late October 1996, at the SEAT Open. She won two matches in the qualifying stages, before losing to Jana Kandarr. On 17 November 1996, Sanjeev won her first ITF Women's Circuit title, defeating Raluca Sandu in the finals of the $25k tournament in Bad Gögging, Germany. Sanjeev played her first Grand Slam tournament at the 1997 Australian Open, where she lost in the second qualifying round to Yuka Yoshida, having overcome Petra Mandula in the previous round.

Nirupama shifted her base to Sarasota, Florida in 1997 where she trained with David O'Meara who was the former coach of Leander Paes for two years. At the 1997 Lipton Championships in March, her third tour-level event, she failed to win her first match, losing it to Elena Brioukhovets. A month later, she competed in the main draw of a WTA event for the first time (at the 1997 Japan Open), with qualifying wins over Yi Jingqian, Keiko Nagatomi, and Akiko Morigami. However, she fell in the first round to Jolene Watanabe. The following week, at the Danamon Open in Jakarta, she played her second WTA-level main draw match, losing it also (to Yuka Yoshida). During the clay court season, she would fall in the first qualifying matches of both the Internationaux de Strasbourg (to Kristina Brandi), as well as Roland Garros (to Park Sung-hee). Although she still didn't qualify, Sanjeev performed a little better at the grass court tournaments, winning her first qualifying matches at both the DFS Classic (against Haruka Inoue) and Wimbledon (against Kate Warne-Holland). She also failed to qualify for the US Open, winning only one match. During the course of the 1996–97, Sanjeev also won four ITF titles in doubles with different partners.

At the 1998 Australian Open, Sanjeev was awarded a wildcard into the main draw (her first and ultimately the only appearance in a singles major main draw). She became the first Indian female in the Open era to feature and win a round in a major main draw, beating Gloria Pizzichini.

Later that year, in April, she couldn't qualify for the Makarska Championships, being defeated by Virág Csurgó. Although she lost in the final qualifying round of the Bol Open, she received entry into the main draw as a lucky loser; however, she lost the encounter against Amélie Mauresmo. She also went on to lose in the qualifying stages of both the Páginas Amarillas Open and the French Open, as well as Wimbledon, the Bank of the West Classic, the Boston Cup, and the US Open. She then won the bronze medal at the 1998 Bangkok Asian Games in mixed doubles, partnering Mahesh Bhupathi.

The 1999 season saw her losing her qualifying matches at the Thalgo Open and the Australian Open (falling to Brie Rippner and Sandra Kleinová, respectively). She further failed to qualify for the clay court WTA events she played in April–May, losing to Eva Bes Ostariz, Rosa María Andrés Rodríguez, Janet Lee, and Surina De Beer, at the Portugal Open, the Belgian Open, the Internationaux de Strasbourg, and the French Open, respectively. She also had a disappointing result at Wimbledon. However, at the US Open, she did have two good wins in qualifying against Tathiana Garbin and Katalin Marosi, followed by two further qualifying wins against Mireille Dittmann and Magdalena Maleeva at the Malaysian Open, and another at the Thailand Open against Tatiana Kovalchuk.

After promising wins against Jaslyn Hewitt and Kimberly Po at the 2000 Australian Open qualifying, she fell to Kerry-Anne Guse. At Roland Garros, she lost to Desislava Topalova; and at Wimbledon, she lost to Vanessa Webb. She did manage to win a match at the US Open, though, against Sybille Bammer in the qualifying. Sanjeev then went on to represent India at the 2000 Sydney Olympics, playing in the women's doubles event with Manisha Malhotra. The team suffered a defeat at the hands of Australian's Jelena Dokic and Rennae Stubbs in round one. Earlier in the 2000, she won her second (and ultimately the last) ITF title in April, winning against Sai Jayalakshmy Jayaram in the $10k tournament held on carpet courts in New Delhi. Nirupama won a total of four ITF doubles titles in 2000, and reached a further two finals, making it a career-best season in doubles.

At the 2001 Australian Open qualifying, as well, she lost to Alexandra Fusai in the final round. During the Middle East swing at the Qatar Ladies Open and the Dubai Tennis Championships, she lost to Lenka Němečková in the first qualifying round in the former; but, managed to make it to the final qualifying hurdle of the latter with wins over Martina Suchá and Liezel Huber. She couldn't perform well at the other majors of the season. However, she won her first (and eventually, the only) main draw doubles match of a Grand Slam at the 2001 Wimbledon Championships, partnering Rika Hiraki; the pair had defeated Silvia Farina Elia and Iroda Tulyaganova. She won the last two ITF doubles titles of her career in April 2001; one in Ho Chi Minh City (with Manisha Malhotra) and one in Sarasota, Florida (with Melissa Middleton). The latter of these, being a $75k event, is the biggest title of her career.

2002 saw Sanjeev play only a single tournament due to injury, losing in the US Open qualifying. In 2003, she played exclusively in ITF Women's Circuit tournaments. She went into her first retirement from the sport, losing in the second qualifying round of the ITF $50k tournament in Louisville, Kentucky to Petra Rampre, in late-July 2003.

Sanjeev briefly came back to professional tennis in 2009. Playing in her first match in six years, she beat Tamara Čurović, before losing to Tamarine Tanasugarn in the second round of the $50k Pune Women's Championships in November. Between November 2009 and September 2010, she played in a total of seven ITF tournaments with mixed results. The $25k tournament held in Redding, California, would be her last professional tournament in both the disciplines. Her last singles win was against Brianna Morgan in the final qualifying round, and her final match was a loss in round one against Amanda McDowell. In doubles, playing with Ellen Tsay, she won her first round match against Yawna Allen and Brittany Augustine. Her final doubles match would be a loss in the following round, to Megan Falcon and Macall Harkins.

She represented India at the 2010 Commonwealth Games (in October) in Delhi. After defeating Sarah Borwell and Anna Smith (England) in the quarterfinals alongside Poojashree Venkatesha, they lost to Australia's Olivia Rogowska and Jessica Moore in the semifinals, thereby sending them into the bronze-medal playoff. Playing against compatriots Sania Mirza and Rushmi Chakravarthi, they lost in straight sets. In the mixed doubles event, she partnered Rohan Bopanna but was defeated in the pre-quarterfinals by Anastasia Rodionova and Paul Hanley (Australia).

Later that same month, Sanjeev went over to Guangzhou to take part in the 2010 Asian Games, playing for India. Partnering with Tara Iyer in women's doubles, she lost in round two to the Chinese team of Sun Shengnan and Zhang Shuai.

She finally retired during the later 2000s.

For the past five years, Nirupama has been on the expert commentary team along with Indian tennis legend Vijay Amritraj for ESPN-STAR sports. Nirupama ran a tennis coaching camp in the Bay Area, California until 2024. She launched her autobiography The Moonballer in October 2013. Now, She is coaching young players in Florida such as her daughter.

== Personal life ==
On 23 May 2002, she married Sanjeev Balakrishnan, a software engineer from Bay Area, California; the brother of the Indian sprinter Rajeev Balakrishnan.

== Career statistics ==
=== ITF finals ===
Legend
$75,000 tournaments
$50,000 tournaments
$25,000 tournaments
$10,000 tournaments

==== Singles: 4 (2–2) ====
Result	Date	Tournament	Surface	Opponent	Score
Loss	15 July 1996	Bilbao, Spain	Clay	(Spain) Laura Pena	6–1, 4–6, 5–7
Loss	2 September 1996	Spoleto, Italy	Clay	(France) Catherine Mothes-Jobkel	5–7, 2–6
Win	17 November 1996	Bad Gögging, Germany	Carpet (i)	(Romania) Raluca Sandu	6–4, 6–1
Win	17 April 2000	New Delhi, India	Carpet	(India) Sai Jayalakshmy Jayaram	6–3, 6–2

==== Doubles: 16 (10–6) ====
Result	No.	Date	Tournament	Surface	Partner	Opponents	Score
Loss	1.	21 August 1995	Wezel, Belgium	Clay	(Czech Republic) Olga Hostáková	(Czech Republic) Ivana Havrlíková (Czech Republic) Monika Kratochvílová	2–6, 3–6
Win	1.	15 April 1996	Gelos, France	Clay	(Zimbabwe) Cara Black	(France) Amélie Mauresmo (France) Isabelle Taesch	7–6^{(4)}, 6–3
Win	2.	28 October 1996	Poitiers, France	Hard (i)	(Belarus) Olga Barabanschikova	(Netherlands) Anique Snijders (France) Noëlle van Lottum	6–2, 6–3
Win	3.	17 November 1996	Bad Gögging, Germany	Carpet (i)	(Austria) Barbara Schwartz	(Netherlands) Kirstin Freye (Germany) Silke Meier	6–4, 6–1
Win	4.	30 June 1997	Stuttgart-Vaihingen, Germany	Clay	(Netherlands) Seda Noorlander	(Argentina) María Fernanda Landa (Germany) Marlene Weingärtner	6–3, 6–1
Loss	2.	3 August 1998	Lexington, United States	Hard	(China) Yi Jingqian	(Australia) Amanda Grahame (Australia) Bryanne Stewart	4–6, 6–1, 3–6
Loss	3.	4 October 1999	Albuquerque, US	Hard	(Austria) Marion Maruska	(United States) Debbie Graham (Japan) Nana Smith	4–6, 5–7
Loss	4.	13 December 1998	New Delhi, India	Hard	(Italy) Tathiana Garbin	(Japan) Rika Hiraki (United Kingdom) Lorna Woodroffe	2–5 ret.
Win	5.	17 April 2000	New Delhi, India	Carpet	(India) Sai Jayalakshmy Jayaram	(India) Rushmi Chakravarthi (India) Radhika Tulpule	6–4, 6–2
Win	6.	17 July 2000	Mahwah, United States	Hard	(Australia) Evie Dominikovic	(Australia) Lisa McShea (Kazakhstan) Irina Selyutina	6–4, 6–4
Loss	5.	2 October 2000	Albuquerque, US	Hard	(Australia) Lisa McShea	(United States) Brie Rippner (Ukraine) Elena Tatarkova	4–6, 4–6
Loss	6.	23 October 2000	Dallas, United States	Hard	(Japan) Nana Smith	(United States) Brie Rippner (Ukraine) Elena Tatarkova	3–6, 6–3, 3–6
Win	7.	30 October 2000	Hayward, United States	Hard	(Japan) Nana Smith	(Republic of Ireland) Kelly Liggan (Venezuela) Milagros Sequera	4–2 4–2
Win	8.	6 November 2000	Pittsburgh, United States	Hard (i)	(Japan) Nana Smith	(Netherlands) Seda Noorlander (Germany) Kirstin Freye	5–7, 6–4, 6–0
Win	9.	22 April 2001	Ho Chi Minh City, Vietnam	Hard	(India) Manisha Malhotra	(New Zealand) Leanne Baker (New Zealand) Shelley Stephens	6–3, 7–5
Win	10.	29 April 2001	Sarasota, United States	Clay	(United States) Melissa Middleton	(Chinese Taipei) Janet Lee (United States) Samantha Reeves	6–4, 6–2
