= Li Si (tennis) =

Chinese tennis player

- Country (sports): China
- Born: 29 April 1976 (age 49)

Singles
- Highest ranking: No. 636 (21 July 1997)

Doubles
- Career record: 0-2 (ATP Tour)
- Highest ranking: No. 608 (21 July 1997)
Medal record
Asian Games
Bronze medal – third place	1998 Bangkok	Mixed doubles
Universiade
Bronze medal – third place	2001 Beijing	Men's doubles

Li Si (born 29 April 1976) is a Chinese former professional tennis player.

Known as "Bruce", Li played college tennis for Clemson University in the late 1990s. He was the tournament MVP when Clemson claimed the 1997 ACC championship.

Li twice featured in the doubles main draw at the Shanghai Open, including in 1999 when he and Yang Jingzhu lost in the first round to the world's top ranked pair, Mahesh Bhupathi and Leander Paes.

Between 1998 and 2001, Li was a member of the China Davis Cup team and featured in a total of four ties. He won the only singles rubber he played (against Aisam-ul-Haq Qureshi) and won two of his four doubles rubbers.

Li won bronze medals for China at both the 1998 Asian Games in Bangkok and 2001 Universiade in Beijing, for mixed doubles and men's doubles respectively.
