= Zhang Yu (tennis) =

Chinese tennis player

- Country (sports): China
- Born: 26 September 1976 (age 49) Sichuan, China
- Prize money: $19,274

Singles
- Career record: 0–2 (ATP Tour)
- Highest ranking: No. 696 (14 May 2001)

Doubles
- Career record: 0–2 (ATP Tour)
- Highest ranking: No. 462 (2 August 2004)

Zhang Yu (born 26 September 1976) is a Chinese former professional tennis player. He is the husband and former coach of retired WTA Tour player Zheng Jie.

Zhang represented China in a total of 10 Davis Cup ties between 1998 and 2001, for wins in four singles rubbers.

On the ATP Tour, Zhang made singles main draw appearances at the Shanghai Open in both 1998 and 2000.
