= Lilia Biktyakova =

Uzbekistani tennis player

- Country (sports): Uzbekistan
- Born: 2 February 1979 (age 46) Tashkent, Uzbekistan
- Plays: Left-handed
- Prize money: $4,417

Singles
- Career record: 5–11
- Highest ranking: No. 799 (24 Aug 1998)

Doubles
- Career record: 2–10
- Highest ranking: No. 740 (5 Oct 1998)

Lilia Biktyakova (born 2 February 1979) is an Uzbekistani former professional tennis player.

== Tennis career ==
A left-handed player from Tashkent, Biktyakova represented the Uzbekistan Fed Cup team in the late 1990s. From her 11 Fed Cup ties she won two singles and two doubles rubbers. In addition to the Fed Cup she also competed for Uzbekistan at the 1998 Asian Games. She twice appeared as a wildcard in the main draw of the Tashkent Open, in 1999 and 2000.

Biktyakova was a four-time All-American during her collegiate tennis career for Georgia College from 1998 to 2001. She was Georgia College's Female Athlete of the Year in 2001.

== Personal life ==
Biktyakova married Georgia College golfer Alex McMichael.

Her younger sister, Luiza, was also a tennis player, competing at Fed Cup level and for Georgia College.
