= Indonesia at the 1998 Asian Games =

- IOC code: INA
- NOC: Indonesian Olympic Committee
- Website: www.nocindonesia.or.id (in English)

in Bangkok
- Medals Ranked 11th: Gold 6 Silver 10 Bronze 11 Total 27

Asian Games appearances (overview)
- 1951; 1954; 1958; 1962; 1966; 1970; 1974; 1978; 1982; 1986; 1990; 1994; 1998; 2002; 2006; 2010; 2014; 2018; 2022; 2026

Indonesia participated in the 1998 Asian Games held in the city of Bangkok, Thailand from 6 December 1998 to 20 December 1998. Indonesia ranked 11th with 6 gold medals. 10 silver medals, and 11 bronze medals in this edition of the Asiad.

== Medal summary ==
=== Medal table ===
Sport	Gold	Silver	Bronze	Total
Badminton	2	2	2	6
Karate	1	2	3	6
Tennis	1	0	1	2
Athletics	1	0	0	1
Sailing	1	0	0	1
Boxing	0	2	0	2
Taekwondo	0	1	2	3
Beach Volleyball	0	1	1	2
Canoeing	0	1	0	1
Rowing	0	1	0	1
Weightlifting	0	0	1	1
Wushu	0	0	1	1
Total	6	10	11	27

=== Medalists ===
Medal	Name	Sport	Event
Gold	Supriyati Sutono	Athletics	Women's 5000 m
Gold	Tony Gunawan; Hendrawan; Taufik Hidayat; Tri Kusharjanto; Rexy Mainaky; Budi Santoso; Ricky Subagja; Candra Wijaya	Badminton	Men's team
Gold	Ricky Subagja; Rexy Mainaky	Badminton	Men's doubles
Gold	Arif Taufan Syamsudin	Karate	Men's kumite −60 kg
Gold	Oka Sulaksana	Sailing	Men's Mistral
Gold	Yayuk Basuki	Tennis	Women's singles
Silver	Hendrawan	Badminton	Men's singles
Silver	Eliza Nathanael; Deyana Lomban	Badminton	Women's doubles
Silver	Agus Salim; Irilkhun Shofana	Beach volleyball	Men
Silver	Hermensen Ballo	Boxing	Men's −51kg
Silver	Willem Papilaya	Boxing	Men's −63.5 kg
Silver	Absir; Laode Hadi; Lampada; Sayadin	Canoeing	Men's K4 – 1000m
Silver	Sandra Aryani	Karate	Women's kumite −53 kg
Silver	Omita Olga Ompi	Karate	Women's individual kata
Silver	Lasmin	Rowing	Men's single sculls
Silver	Satriyo Rahadhani	Taekwondo	Men's FlyWeight
Bronze	Mia Audina; Carmelita; Cindana Hartono; Indarti Isolina; Deyana Lomban; Meiluawati; Eliza Nathanael; Minarti Timur	Badminton	Women's team
Bronze	Tri Kusharjanto; Minarti Timur	Badminton	Mixed doubles
Bronze	Anjas Menasmara; Iwan Sumoyo	Beach volleyball	Men
Bronze	Abdullah Kadir	Karate	Men's individual kata
Bronze	Isfan Tanjung	Karate	Men's kumite −55 kg
Bronze	Nilawati Daud	Karate	Women's kumite −60 kg
Bronze	Sinta Berliana Heru	Taekwondo	Women's Heavyweight
Bronze	Juana Wangsa Putri	Taekwondo	Women's Flyweight
Bronze	Liza Andriyani; Yayuk Basuki; Irawati Moerid Iskandar; Wynne Prakusya	Tennis	Women's team
Bronze	Sri Indriyani	Weightlifting	Women's −48kg
Bronze	Jainab	Wushu	Women's taijiquan
