= Michihisa Onoda =

Japanese tennis player (born 1978)

- Country (sports): Japan
- Born: 31 January 1978 (age 48)
- Plays: Right-handed
- Prize money: $71,056

Singles
- Career record: 0–4 (at ATP Tour level, Grand Slam level, and in Davis Cup)
- Career titles: 4 ITF
- Highest ranking: No. 301 (11 October 2004)

Doubles
- Career record: 2–4 (at ATP Tour level, Grand Slam level, and in Davis Cup)
- Career titles: 1 Challenger, 3 ITF
- Highest ranking: No. 306 (26 April 2004)
Medal record
Representing Japan
Asian Games
Gold medal – first place	2002 Busan	Team
Silver medal – second place	1998 Bangkok	Team
Bronze medal – third place	1998 Bangkok	Doubles
Summer Universiade
Bronze medal – third place	1999 Palma de Mallorca	Men's doubles
Bronze medal – third place	1999 Palma de Mallorca	Mixed doubles
- Last updated on: 25 June 2018.

Michihisa Onoda (小野田倫久, Onoda MIchihisa; born 31 January 1978) is a former Japanese tennis player.

Onoda has a career high ATP singles ranking of 301 achieved on 11 October 2004. He also has a career high ATP doubles ranking of 306 achieved on 26 April 2004.

Onoda has 1 ATP Challenger Tour title at the 2003 Busan Open.
