= Takahiro Terachi =

Japanese tennis player (born 1979)

- Native name: 寺地貴弘
- Country (sports): Japan
- Born: 8 July 1979 (age 47) Tokyo, Japan
- Plays: Right-handed
- Prize money: $182,784

Singles
- Career record: 4–7 (ATP Tour)
- Highest ranking: No. 219 (24 April 2000)

Grand Slam singles results
- Australian Open: Q2 (1999, 2002)
- Wimbledon: Q2 (2000)
- US Open: Q3 (2000)

Doubles
- Career record: 0–2 (ATP Tour)
- Highest ranking: No. 364 (3 November 2003)
Medal record
Asian Games
Gold medal – first place	2002 Busan	Team
Silver medal – second place	1998 Bangkok	Team
Bronze medal – third place	1998 Bangkok	Doubles

Takahiro Terachi (born 8 July 1979) is a former professional tennis player from Japan.

== Tennis career ==
Born in Tokyo, Terachi began competing professionally in 1998 and reached a career high singles ranking of 219 in the world, winning 17 ITF Futures titles. His best performance on the ATP Tour came at the 2001 Shanghai Open, where he won his way through to the quarter-finals, with wins over Cecil Mamiit and Michael Tebbutt. He made the Japan Open second round twice from six appearances, including 2005 when he defeated Philipp Kohlschreiber.

Terachi appeared for Japan in four Davis Cup ties from 2002 to 2004. He won two of his four doubles rubbers. His only singles rubber was against Febi Widhiyanto and he had to retire in the second set with a wrist injury.

In addition to the Davis Cup he also represented Japan in the Asian Games and won a doubles bronze in Bangkok in 1998, partnering Michihisa Onoda. He was a gold medalist in the team event at the 2002 Asian Games in Busan, with his upset win over South Korean's Lee Hyung-taik giving Japan an unassailable 2–0 lead in the final.

== Performance timeline ==
Key
W	F	SF	QF	#R	RR	Q#	DNQ	A	NH

(W) winner; (F) finalist; (SF) semifinalist; (QF) quarterfinalist; (#R) rounds 4, 3, 2, 1; (RR) round-robin stage; (Q#) qualification round; (DNQ) did not qualify; (A) absent; (NH) not held; (SR) strike rate (events won / competed); (W–L) win–loss record.

=== Singles ===
Tournament	1999	2000	2001	2002	W–L	Win %
Grand Slam tournaments
Australian Open	Q2		A	Q2	0–0	–
French Open					0–0	–
Wimbledon		Q2			0–0	–
US Open		Q3			0–0	–
Win–loss					0–0	–

== See also ==
- List of Japan Davis Cup team representatives
