= Syed Fazaluddin =

Indian tennis player and coach

- Country (sports): India
- Born: 18 October 1974 (age 50); Calcutta, India
- Height: 1.86 m (6 ft 1 in)
- Turned pro: 1998
- Retired: 2002
- Plays: Right-handed

Singles
- Highest ranking: No. 396 (15 November 1999)

Doubles
- Highest ranking: No. 243 (12 June 2000)
- Last updated on: 12 October 2013.

Fazaluddin Syed (Bengali: সৈয়দ ফজলউদ্দিন; born 18 October 1974) is a tennis coach and former professional tennis player from India. He has competed on the ATP tennis tour, achieving a Top 400 ranking in singles and Top 200 ranking in doubles. Fazal has represented India in Davis Cup between 1998 and 2001.

== Early life ==
Fazal was born in Kolkata, India, and is the son of Syed Naeemuddin, who was one of India's prominent footballers.. Fazal ranked No. 1 as a junior (U-18) in India. He played collegiate tennis at Temple University and was ranked No. 1 in both singles and doubles. He was also elected captain of Men's Tennis at Temple University.

== Career ==
Fazal achieved a Top 400 ranking in singles and Top 200 ranking in doubles. He represented India in the Davis Cup between 1998 and 2001. Fazal was the National grass court Champion of India in 2000. He was a bronze medalist at the 1998 Asian Games in Bangkok in 1998. Fazal earned No. 1 ranking as an Amateur by the USTA 1997–98. He won the 1997 USTA National clay court championships.

== Post-retirement ==
After his retirement in 2002 he coached former world No. 1 doubles player Mahesh Bhupathi and Martin Damm (top 10 Doubles) on the 2005 US Open circuit. He coached Bhupathi on mixed double the same year. Fazal operates a Level 7 Tennis academy in Philadelphia. With Level 7 Tennis he has coached a possible future star in John Robertson, one of the brightest British tennis prospects.
