= Yoon Yong-il =

South Korean tennis player

Yoon Yong-Il
- Country (sports): South Korea
- Residence: Seoul, South Korea
- Born: 23 September 1973 (age 52) Daegu, South Korea
- Height: 1.75 m (5 ft 9 in)
- Turned pro: 1996
- Plays: Right-handed
- Prize money: US$190,990

Singles
- Career record: 20–20
- Career titles: 0
- Highest ranking: No. 140 (December 18, 2000)

Grand Slam singles results
- Australian Open: Q3 (1994, 1996, 1997)
- French Open: Q2 (2001)
- Wimbledon: 1R (2001)
- US Open: 1R (1998)

Doubles
- Career record: 6–12
- Career titles: 0
- Highest ranking: No. 188 (May 14, 2001)
Medal record
Tennis
Representing South Korea
Asian Games
Gold medal – first place	1998 Bangkok	Men's Singles
Gold medal – first place	1998 Bangkok	Team Event
Silver medal – second place	1998 Bangkok	Men's Doubles
Silver medal – second place	2002 Busan	Team Event
Summer Universiade
Gold medal – first place	1995 Fukuoka	Men's Singles
Gold medal – first place	1997 Catania	Men's Singles
Gold medal – first place	1997 Catania	Men's Doubles

Yoon Yong-Il (born September 23, 1973, in Daegu, South Korea) is a former professional South Korean tennis player.

Yoon reached his highest individual ranking on the ATP Tour on December 18, 2000, when he became World number 140. He played primarily on the Futures circuit and the Challenger circuit.

Yoon was a member of the South Korean Davis Cup team, posting a 16–10 record in singles and a 3–4 record in doubles in sixteen ties played.

== Tour singles titles – all levels (7–10) ==
Legend (singles)
Grand Slam (0–0)
Tennis Masters Cup (0–0)
ATP Masters Series (0–0)
ATP Tour (0–0)
Challengers (1–2)
Futures (6–8)

Outcome	No.	Date	Tournament	Surface	Opponent in the final	Score
Winner	1.	September 23, 1996	Beijing, China	Hard	(China) Xia Jiaping	6–4, 2–6, 6–1
Winner	2.	May 4, 1998	Beijing, China	Hard	(Japan) Hideki Kaneko	6–3, 7–5
Runner-up	1.	May 11, 1998	Tianjin, China	Hard	(Japan) Hideki Kaneko	4–6, 7–6, 0–6
Runner-up	2.	October 5, 1998	Maishima, Japan	Carpet	(South Korea) Lee Hyung-Taik	6–7, 6–2, 4–6
Winner	3.	July 5, 1999	Jakarta, Indonesia	Clay	(South Africa) Rik De Voest	7–6, 7–5
Runner-up	3.	July 26, 1999	(United States) St. Joseph, U.S.	Hard	(France) Thomas Dupré	6–4, 4–6, 1–6
Winner	4.	August 9, 1999	(United States) Kansas City, U.S.	Hard	(Argentina) David Nalbandian	6–3, 6–7, 6–2
Winner	5.	February 28, 2000	Jakarta, Indonesia	Hard	(South Korea) Kwon Oh-hee	6–2, 6–4
Runner-up	4.	May 8, 2000	Fukuoka, Japan	Grass	(Japan) Takahiro Terachi	6–2, 6–7, 1–6
Winner	6.	May 15, 2000	Osaka, Japan	Hard	(Australia) Paul Baccanello	6–4, 6–7, 6–4
Runner-up	5.	May 22, 2000	Seoul, South Korea	Clay	(South Korea) Park Seung-kyu	5–7, 6–7
Runner-up	6.	July 24, 2000	(United States) Winnetka, U.S.	Hard	(Japan) Takao Suzuki	2–6, 4–6
Runner-up	7.	August 7, 2000	(United States) Binghamton, U.S.	Hard	(Japan) Takao Suzuki	1–6, 4–6
Runner-up	8.	November 27, 2000	Manila, Philippines	Hard	(Austria) Zbynek Mlynarik	6–4, 0–6, 2–6
Runner-up	9.	December 4, 2000	Manila, Philippines	Hard	(Thailand) Danai Udomchoke	3–6, 6–3, 5–7
Winner	7.	April 21, 2003	Kumamoto, Japan	Hard	(Germany) Benjamin Kohllöffel	6–3, 6–2
Runner-up	10.	December 12, 2003	Seogwipo, South Korea	Clay	(Japan) Takahiro Terachi	0–6, 5–7
