= All Japan Championships =

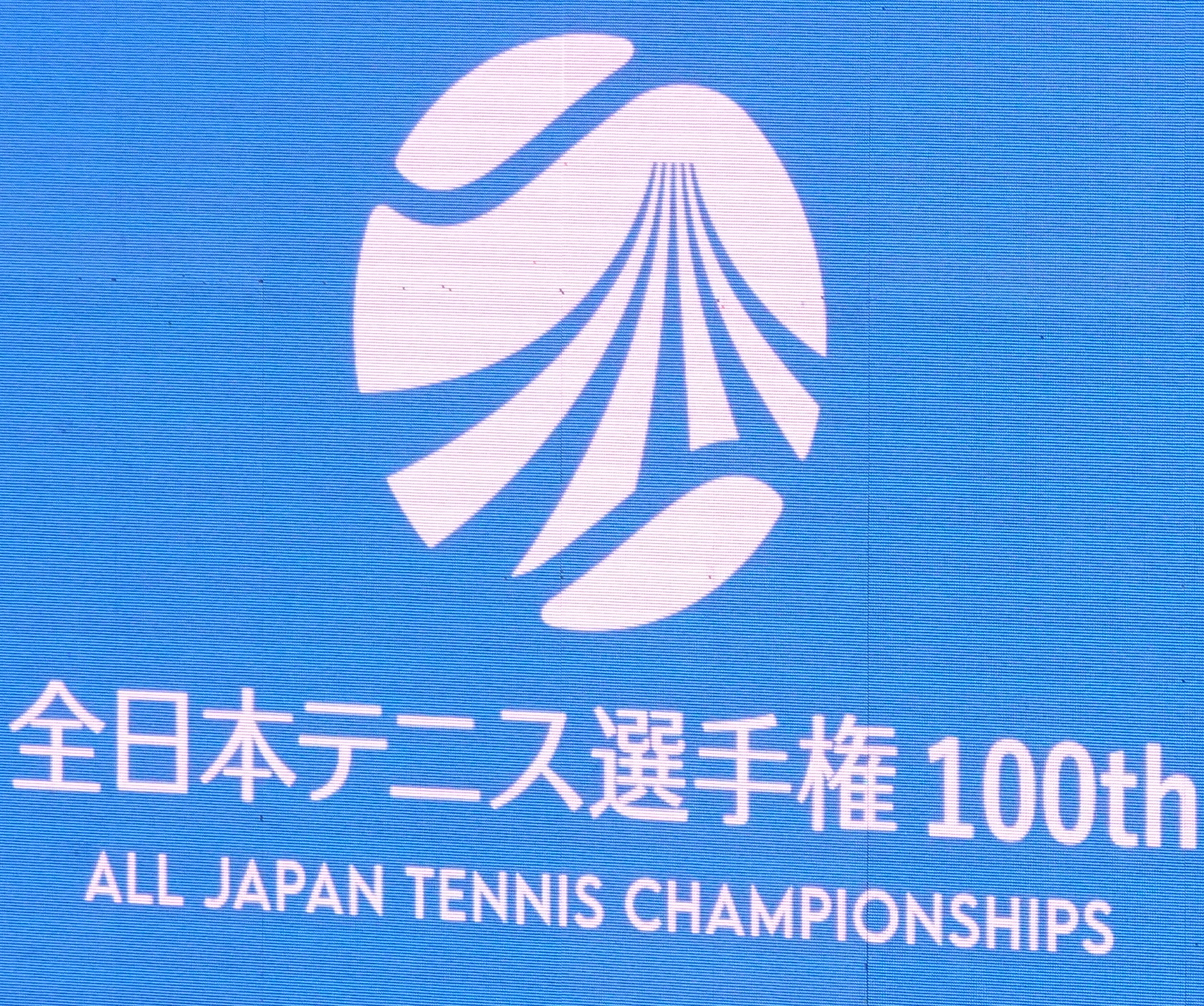

Tournament information
- Founded: 1922
- Location: Tokyo; Japan
- Venue: Ariake Tennis Forest Park
- Surface: Hard
- Website: jta-tennis.or.jp/alljapan

Current champions (2023)
- Men's singles: Seong-chan Hong
- Women's singles: Moyuka Uchijima

The All Japan Tennis Championships (Japanese: 全日本テニス選手権) is a Japanese tennis tournament that was founded in 1922 (there had been another Japanese championships held once in 1915). The All Japan championships was an international event (although in many years there were few overseas competitors) but after the Japan Open began, the All Japan championships became a national event, it's currently sponsored by Mitsubishi Electric company.

== History ==
A Japanese championships was first held in 1915 when the British player G. A. Roper beat his compatriot H. C. M. Horne in the final in four sets. The event was held on the grounds of the Kobe Club in Mirume. The entries were few, as the native players of Tokyo and Yokohama wanted the meeting held in Tokyo, but that was impossible, as the Kobe club was the only club affiliated to the Lawn Tennis Association.

The All-Japan Championships was first played in 1922 in Tokyo (a few months after the Japanese Tennis Association was formed) as a men's only tournament. In 1924, a women's event was added to the programme. The tournament has been mainly played in Tokyo throughout its long run but has also been staged in other cities such as Osaka in 1933, 1935, 1937, 1939. Following World War II, the event was sometimes known as the Japan International Championships until 1972.

The All-Japan championships continues to this day but is a national event for Japanese players only, whilst the Japan Open took over the mantle as the Japan international event from 1972 onwards.

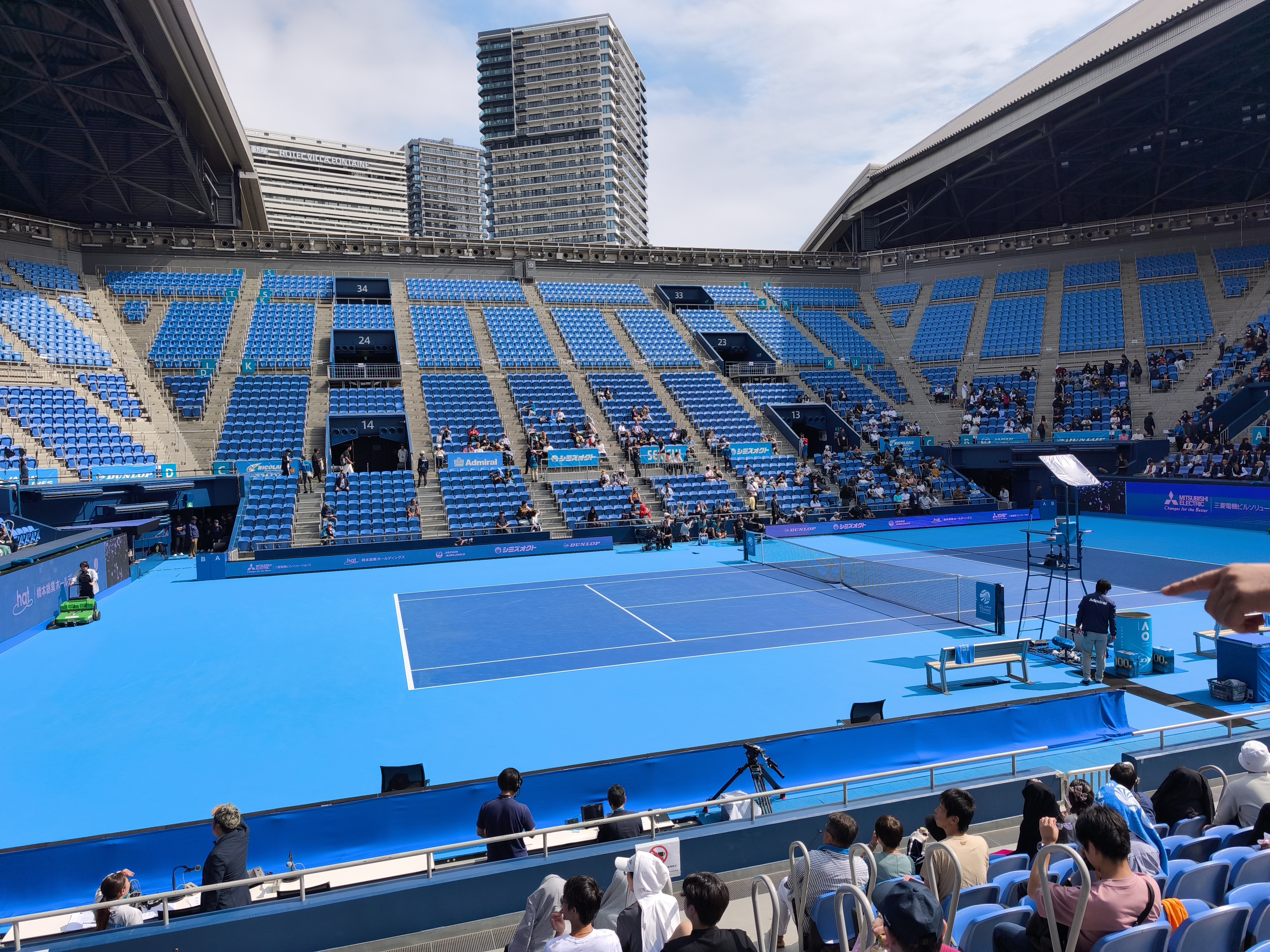
Ariake Tennis Park during a match of the 100th edition of the All Japan Tennis Championships in October 2025

== Past finals ==
=== Men's singles ===
Year	Champion	Runner-up	Score
1915 (Note: This tournament was not the same tournament that began in 1922)	(United Kingdom) G.A. Roper	(United Kingdom) H.C.M. Horne	6–1, 7–5, 9–11, 6–4
1922	(Japan) Masanosuke Fukuda	(Japan) Yoshiro Ohta	6–2, 6–2, 7–5
1923	(Japan) Takeichi Harada	(Japan) Teizo Toba	5–7, 6–3, 5–7, 6–2, 6–2
1924	(Japan) Tsumio Tawara	(Japan) Ryuki Miki	2–6, 4–6, 7–5, 6–1, 8–6
1925	(Japan) Tsumio Tawara (2)	(Japan) Ryuki Miki	6–4, 4–6, 4–6, 6–4, 7–5
1926	(Japan) Yoshiro Ota	(Japan) Ryuki Miki	6–2, 6–4, 2–6, 6–4
1927	(Japan) Tamio Abe	(Japan) Koichiro Ishii	2–6, 7–5, 6–2, 8–6
1928	(Japan) Hajime Makino	(Empire of Japan) Jiro Sato	4–6, 7–5, 8–6, 6–0
1929	(Japan) Takeichi Harada	(Empire of Japan) Jiro Sato	6–3, 6–3, 6–2
1930	(Empire of Japan) Jiro Sato	(Japan) Hyotaro Sato	6–4, 8–6, 6–2
1931	(Japan) Takeo Kuwabara	(Japan) Eikichi Itoh	6–2, 6–4, 4–6, 6–3
1932	(Japan) Ryosuke Nunoi	(Empire of Japan) Jiro Sato	5-7, 6–2, 2–6, 6–4, 6–1
1933	(Japan) Hideo Nishimura	(Japan) Jiro Fujikura	6–1, 6–4, 3–6, 6–2
1934	(Japan) Jiro Yamagishi	(Japan) Hideo Nishimura	6–0, 6–3, 6–1
1935	(Japan) Jiro Yamagishi (2)	(Czech Republic) Roderich Menzel	7–5, 6–2, 6–2
1936	(Japan) Jiro Yamagishi (3)	(Japan) Akimasa Miura	6–4, 4–6, 3–6, 7–5, 6–0
1937	(Nazi Germany) Gottfried von Cramm	(Japan) Jiro Yamagishi	7–9, 6–4, 6–4, 6–4
1938	(Japan) Jiro Yamagishi (4)	(Japan) Tetsuo Takamuku	6–4, 6–3, 5-7, 6–2
1939	(Socialist Federal Republic of Yugoslavia) Franjo Punčec	(Japan) Fumiteru Nakano	4–6, 6–2, 6–2, 6–3
1940	(Japan) Haruo Kodera	(Japan) Nakahara Shiken	6–8, 1–6, 6–2, 6–3, 6–4
1941	Not held		
1942	(Japan) Tamotsu Washimi	(Japan) Shin Tanabe	6–1, 6–0, 6–1
1943–45	Not held		
1946	(Japan) Goro Fujikura	(Japan) Michihiko Kawazoe	6–4, 3–6, 6–3, 6–3
1947	(Japan) Fumiteru Nakano	(Japan) Goro Fujikura	4–6, 3–6, 7–5, 6–4, 6–0
1948	(Japan) Fumiteru Nakano (2)	(Japan) Goro Fujikura	6–4, 8–6, 6–3
1949	(Japan) Jiro Kumamaru	(Japan) Goro Fujikura	6–4, 6–2, 6–3
1950	(Japan) Jiro Kumamaru (2)	(Japan) Goro Fujikura	6–0, 5–7, 6–4, 6–0
1951	(Japan) Jiro Kumamaru (3)	(United States) Arthur Larsen	6–4, 6–3, 6–1
1952	(Japan) Jiro Kumamaru (4)	(Japan) Kosei Kamo	6–3, 6–4, 6–3
1953	(Japan) Kosei Kamo	(Japan) Ayato Kamo	6–3, 6–2, 6–3
1954	(Japan) Atsushi Miyagi	(Japan) Kosei Kamo	4–6, 6–2, 6–3, 3–6, 6–3
1955	(Japan) Atsushi Miyagi (2)	(Japan) Yoshio Yoshimura	6–1, 9–7, 11–9
1956	(Japan) Kosei Kamo (2)	(Japan) Atsushi Miyagi	7–5, 6–0, 7–5
1957	(Japan) Atsushi Miyagi (3)	(Japan) Yoshihisa Shibata	6–3, 6–1, 6–3
1958	(United States) Ham Richardson	(United States) Alex Olmedo	6–2, 6–1, 6–1
1959	(United States) Barry MacKay	(Japan) Atsushi Miyagi	6–2, 6–3, 6–3
1960	(Japan) Atsushi Miyagi (4)	(Japan) Takeo Hanna	6–4, 6–2, 2–6, 6–1
1961	(Japan) Osamu Ishiguro	(Japan) Isao Watanabe	6–4, 6–3, 6–1
1962	(Sweden) Ulf Schmidt	(Japan) Osamu Ishiguro	6–4, 2–6, 3–6, 6–0, 6–4
1963	(Japan) Osamu Ishiguro (2)	(Japan) Kosei Kamo	6–4, 6–3, 6–1
1964	(Japan) Koji Watanabe	(Japan) Mitsuru Motoi	6–4, 2–6, 3–6, 6–0, 6–4
1965	(Japan) Osamu Ishiguro (3)	(Japan) Keishiro Yanagi	6–4, 8–6, 6–2
1966	(Japan) Ichizo Konishi	(Japan) Koji Watanabe	7–5, 6–3, 4–6, 1–6, 6–4
1967	(Japan) Koji Watanabe (2)	(Japan) Keishiro Yanagi	5–7, 6–4, 6–0, 2–6, 6–4
1968	(Japan) Koji Watanabe (3)	(Japan) Osamu Ishiguro	6–3, 6–4, 4–6, 6–4
1969	(Japan) Isao Kobayashi	(Japan) Ichizo Konishi	7–5, 8–6, 6–1
1970	(Australia) Martin Mulligan	(Japan) Jun Kuki	6–2, 6–3, 7–5
1971	(Japan) Jun Kamiwazumi	(Japan) Toshiro Sakai	6–4, 4–6, 6–4, 6–2
1972	(Japan) Jun Kamiwazumi (2)	(Japan) Kenichi Hirai	6–4, 7–5, 6–3
1973	(Japan) Jun Kamiwazumi (3)	(Japan) Toshiro Sakai	6–4, 6–2, 8–6
1974	(Japan) Toshiro Sakai	(Japan) Kenichi Hirai	6–3, 6–2, 6–3
1975	(Japan) Toshiro Sakai (2)	(Japan) Kenichi Hirai	6–4, 4–6, 2–6, 6–2, 6–2
1976	(United States) Gene Mayer	(Japan) Yukio Kato	6–2, 6–1, 6–1
1977	(Japan) Tsuyoshi Fukui	(Japan) Ryuki Yamamoto	6–2, 6–0, 6–0
1978	(Japan) Tsuyoshi Fukui (2)	(Japan) Tetsu Kuramitsu	7–6, 3–6, 6–2, 1–6, 6–1
1979	(Japan) Tsuyoshi Fukui (3)	(Japan) Jun Kuki	4–6, 2–6, 6–4, 7–6, 6–0
1980	(Japan) Jun Kuki	(Japan) Jun Kamiwazumi	6–3, 6–4, 6–1
1981	(Japan) Tsuyoshi Fukui (4)	(Japan) Jun Kuki	6–0, 6–3, 6–3
1982	(Japan) Shigeyuki Nishio	(Japan) Jun Kuki	6–7, 6–4, 6–4, 6–3
1983	(Japan) Tsuyoshi Fukui (5)	(Japan) Shinichi Sakamoto	6–4, 6–1, 4–6, 6–2
1984	(Japan) Shinichi Sakamoto	(Japan) Shigeyuki Nishio	7–5, 6–2, 6–4
1985	(Japan) Tsuyoshi Fukui (6)	(Japan) Shozo Shiraishi	6–2, 6–3, 7–6(5)
1986	(Japan) Shozo Shiraishi	(Japan) Soichi Nakamura	6–3, 6–4
1987	(Japan) Shigeyuki Nishio (2)	(Japan) Eiji Takeuchi	7–6(5), 6–4, 4–6, 7–6(4)
1988	(Japan) Tsuyoshi Fukui (7)	(Japan) Shozo Shiraishi	6–4, 6–0, 5–7, 7–5
1989	(Japan) Hidehiko Tanizawa	(Japan) Tsuyoshi Fukui	6–4, 6–3, 6–3
1990	(United States) Joseph Russell	(Japan) Eduardo Furusho	4–6, 6–3, 6–3, 7–5
1991	(Japan) Yasufumi Yamamoto	(Japan) Toshihisa Tsuchihashi	6–3, 6–4, 3–6, 5–7, 6–1
1992	(Japan) Yasufumi Yamamoto (2)	(Japan) Ryuso Tsujino	6–4, 3–6, 7–6(6), 6–1
1993	(Japan) Kentaro Masuda	(Japan) Ryuso Tsujino	2–6, 6–4, 6–3, 6–3
1994	(Japan) Kentaro Masuda (2)	(South Korea) Kim Bong-soo	6–7(2), 6–1, 6–4
1995	(Japan) Hideki Kaneko	(Japan) Kotaro Miyachi	6–3, 7–5
1996	(Japan) Takao Suzuki	(Japan) Gouichi Motomura	4–6, 6–1, 6–3
1997	(Japan) Takao Suzuki (2)	(Japan) Kentaro Masuda	6–4, 6–2
1998	(Japan) Yaoki Ishii	(Japan) Kotaro Miyachi	6–1, 6–2
1999	(Japan) Gouichi Motomura	(Japan) Satoshi Iwabuchi	6–1, 6–3
2000	(Japan) Gouichi Motomura (2)	(South Korea) Kwon Oh-hee	5–7, 7–6(4), 6–2
2001	(Japan) Takahiro Terachi	(Japan) Yaoki Ishii	6-4, 6–2
2002	(Japan) Gouichi Motomura (3)	(Japan) Takao Suzuki	4–6, 6–1, 4–1 ret.
2003	(Japan) Gouichi Motomura (4)	(Japan) Takahiro Terachi	4–6, 6–4, 6–4, 6–4
2004	(Japan) Takahiro Terachi (2)	(South Korea) Kwon Hyung Tae	7–5, 6–1, 6–1
2005	(Japan) Satoshi Iwabuchi	(Japan) Go Soeda	6–2, 1–6, 7–6(6)
2006	(Japan) Satoshi Iwabuchi (2)	(Japan) Toshihide Matsui	6–1, 4–6, 7–5
2007	(Japan) Takao Suzuki (3)	(South Korea) Kwon Oh-hee	6–2, 6–2
2008	(Japan) Go Soeda	(Japan) Tatsuma Ito	6–7(2), 6–3, 6–4
2009	(Japan) Go Soeda (2)	(Japan) Yūichi Sugita	6–3, 7–6(3)
2010	(Japan) Yūichi Sugita	(Japan) Takao Suzuki	6–1, 6–3
2011	(Japan) Hiroki Moriya	(Japan) Tatsuma Ito	5–7, 6–2, 7–6(2)
2012	(Japan) Yūichi Sugita (2)	(Japan) Tatsuma Ito	6–4, 6–3
2013	(Japan) Tatsuma Ito	(Japan) Yoshihito Nishioka	6–3, 6–3
2014	(Japan) Hiroyasu Ehara	(Japan) Yūichi Sugita	7–6(7), 6–4
2015	(Japan) Yasutaka Uchiyama	(Japan) Go Soeda	7–6(6), 6–4
2016	(Japan) Yosuke Watanuki	(Japan) Yasutaka Uchiyama	6–2, 6–4
2017	(Japan) Yusuke Takahashi	(Japan) Hiroyasu Ehara	0–6, 6–4, 7–5
2018	(Japan) Tatsuma Ito (2)	(Japan) Renta Tokuda	6–3, 6–0
2019	(Japan) Rio Noguchi	(Japan) Yuta Shimizu	6–3, 6–4
2020	(Japan) Naoki Nakagawa	(Japan) Masamichi Imamura	6–1, 6–2
2021	(Japan) Yuta Shimizu	(Japan) Shintaro Imai	6–3, 6–4
2022	(Japan) Shintaro Imai	(Japan) Shuichi Sekiguchi	7–5, 4–6, 6–3
2023	(Japan) Renta Tokuda	(Japan) Hikaru Shiraishi	6–2, 6–2
2024	(Japan) Masamichi Imamura	(Japan) Kokoro Isomura	7–6(6), 6–4

=== Women's singles ===
Year	Champion	Runner-up	Score
1924	(Japan) T. Kuroi		
1925	(Japan) T. Kuroi (2)		
1926	(Japan) S. Hayama		
1927	(Japan) T. Moriwaki		
1928	(Japan) S. Toda		
1929	(Japan) R. Takiguchi		
1930	(Japan) T. Kobayishi		
1931	(Japan) T. Kobayishi (2)		
1932	(Japan) K. Minami		
1933	(Japan) M. Hayashi		
1934	(Japan) M. Hayashi (2)		
1935	(Japan) T. Nakano		
1936	(Japan) S. Toda (2)		
1937	(Nazi Germany) Marie-Louise Horn		
1938	(Japan) T. Kizen		
1939	(Japan) J. Kamo		
1940	(Japan) S. Sawada		
1941	Not held		
1942	(Japan) M. Yamakawa		
1943–45	Not held		
1946	(Japan) Sachiko Kamo		
1947	(Japan) Sachiko Kamo (2)		
1948	(Japan) Sachiko Kamo (3)		
1949	(Japan) Sachiko Kamo (4)		
1950	(Japan) Sachiko Kamo (5)		
1951	(Japan) Sachiko Kamo (6)		
1952	(Japan) Reiko Miyagi		
1953	(Japan) Sachiko Kamo (7)		
1954	(Japan) Reiko Miyagi (2)		
1955	(Japan) Sachiko Kamo (8)		
1956	(Japan) Reiko Miyagi (3)		
1957	(Japan) Reiko Miyagi (4)		
1958	(Japan) Reiko Miyagi (5)		
1959	(Japan) Reiko Miyagi (6)		
1960	(Japan) Reiko Miyagi (7)		
1961	(Japan) Reiko Miyagi (8)		
1962	(Japan) Reiko Miyagi (9)		
1963	(Japan) Reiko Miyagi (10)		
1964	(Germany) H. Schretz		
1965	(Japan) Kazuko Kuramatsu		
1966	(Japan) Yohko Obata		
1967	(Japan) Kazuko Sawamatsu		
1968	(Japan) Kazuko Sawamatsu (2)		
1969	(Japan) Kazuko Sawamatsu (3)		
1970	(Japan) Kazuko Sawamatsu (4)	(United States) Kathy Harter	6–3, 7–5.
1971	(Japan) Kimiyo Hatanaka	(South Korea) Duk-Hee Lee	9–7, 4–6, 9–7
1972	(Japan) Kazuko Sawamatsu (5)	(Czechoslovakia) Alena Palmeová-West	6–3, 6–0
1973			
1974			
1975			
1976			
1977			
1978			
1979			
1980			
1981			
1982			
1983			
1984			
1985			
1986			
1987			
1988			
1989			
1990			
1991			
1992			
1993			
1994			
1995			
1996			
1997			
1998			
1999			
2000			
2001			
2002			
2003			
2004			
2005			
2006			
2007			
2008			
2009			
2010			
2011			
2012			
2013			
2014			
2015			
2016			
2017			
2018			
2019			
2020			
2021			
2022			
2023			
2024			

=== Men's doubles ===
Year	Champion	Runner-up	Score
1922	(Japan) Kawazuma Ryuzo (Japan) Tamio Abe	(Empire of Japan) Masanosuke Fukuda (Japan) Mi Ogino	6–2, 6–4, 6–4
1923	(Japan) Kawazuma Ryuzo (2) (Japan) Tamio Abe (2)	(Japan) Takeichi Harada (Japan) Iwao Aoki	6–4, 6–3, 3–6, 6–4
1924	(Japan) Takashi Ukegawa (Japan) Iwao Aoki	(Japan) Tamio Abe (Japan) Kawajiri Makoto	6–4, 6–4, 6–0
1925	(Japan) Tamio Abe (3) (Japan) Kawajiri Makoto	(Japan) Tomonaga (Japan) Kobayashi	1–6, 6–3, 6–1, 6–3
1926	(Japan) Hisataka Aikawa (Japan) Kengo Aso	(Japan) Tamio Abe (Japan) Kawajiri Makoto	6–4, 6–4, 2–6, 7–5
1927	(Empire of Japan) Masanosuke Fukuda (Japan) Tamio Abe (4)	(Japan) Hyotaro Sato (Japan) Ryoji Kobayashi	2–6, 6–2, 6–3, 6–3
1928	(Japan) Masakazu Yamagishi (Japan) Hikoshichi Shimura	(Japan) Masuo Uehara (Japan) Toshio Kojiro	6–3, 6–4, 6–1
1929	(Japan) Takeichi Harada (Japan) Ichiya Kumagae	(Japan) Masakazu Yamagishi (Japan) Hikoshichi Shimura	6–2, 6–4, 6–3
1930	(Japan) Masakazu Yamagishi (2) (Japan) Hikoshichi Shimura (2)	(Japan) Ryosuke Nunoi (Japan) Takeo Kuwabara	4–6, 6–4, 6–3, 6–4
1931	(Japan) Masakazu Yamagishi (3) (Japan) Yasuo Murakami	(Japan) Hyotaro Sato (Japan) Mi Kawaji	1–6, 6–3, 7–5, 1–6, 6–2
1932	(Empire of Japan) Jiro Sato (Japan) Mi Kawaji	(Japan) Hideo Nishimura (Japan) Rezo Murakami	8–6, 6–4, 6–2
1933	(Japan) Hideo Nishimura (Japan) Jiro Yamagishi	(Empire of Japan) Jiro Sato (Japan) Ryosuke Nunoi	Def.
1934	(Japan) Hideo Nishimura (2) (Japan) Jiro Yamagishi (2)	(Japan) Masayoshi Takahashi (Japan) Rezo Murakami	6–0, 6–2, 6–1
1935	(Japan) Jiro Yamagishi (3) (Japan) Rezo Murakami	(Czech Republic) Roderich Menzel (Czech Republic) Ladislav Hecht	2–6, 5–7, 6–3, 6–4, 6–4
1936	(Japan) Jiro Yamagishi (4) (Japan) Rezo Murakami (2)	(Japan) Tamio Abe (Japan) Mi Kawaji	14–12, 6–2, 6–2
1937	(Nazi Germany) Gottfried von Cramm (Nazi Germany) Henner Henkel	(Japan) Jiro Yamagishi (Japan) Rezo Murakami	8–10, 6–2, 11–13, 6–2, 6–4
1938	(Japan) Jiro Yamagishi (5) (Japan) Yasuo Tsuruta	(Japan) Fumiteru Nakano (Japan) Takeo Matsumoto	2–6, 6–1, 6–2, 8–6
1939	(Socialist Federal Republic of Yugoslavia) Franjo Punčec (Socialist Federal Republic of Yugoslavia) Franjo Kučković	(Japan) Haruo Horikoshi (Japan) Kenzo Uhara	7–5, 6–3, 6–3
1940	(Japan) Yasuo Murakami (2) (Japan) Haruo Horikoshi	(Japan) Yasuo Tsuruta (Japan) Fujiyo Yamagata	7–9, 6–8, 6–3, 6–2, 6–4
1941	Not held		
1942	(Japan) Yasuo Murakami (3) (Japan) Haruo Horikoshi (2)	(Japan) Shin Tanabe (Japan) Osamu Okada	6–3, 7–5, 9–11, 6–4
1943–45	Not held		
1946	(Japan) Goro Fujikura (Japan) Yasuo Tsuruta (2)	(Japan) Jiro Yamagishi (Japan) Shin Tanabe	7–5, 6–4, 6–4
1947	(Japan) Goro Fujikura (2) (Japan) Yasuo Tsuruta (3)	(Japan) Taneda (Japan) Yoshiichiro Okinaka	7–5, 4–6, 7–5, 6–3
1948	(Japan) Shin Tanabe (Japan) Osamu Okada	(Japan) Goro Fujikura (Japan) Yasuo Tsuruta	6–4, 6–3, 5–7, 7–5
1949	(Japan) Fumiteru Nakano (Japan) Kenzo Uhara	(Japan) Shin Tanabe (Japan) Osamu Okada	6–3, 6–4, 2–6, 6–0
1950	(Japan) Haruo Horikoshi (3) (Japan) Yatsuro Mizuki	(Japan) Goro Fujikura (Japan) Yasuo Tsuruta	5–7, 6–4, 7–5, 2–6, 6–2
1951	(Japan) Jiro Sumikumu (United States) Arthur Larsen	(Japan) Fumiteru Nakano (Japan) Goro Fujikura	8–6, 3–6, 6–0, 6–0
1952	(Japan) Fumiteru Nakano (Japan) Jiro Sumikumu (2)	(Japan) Haruo Horikoshi (Japan) Yatsuro Mizuki	6–1, 8–6, 7–9, 6–1
1953	(Japan) Rezo Murakami (3) (Japan) Kenzo Uhara (2)	(Japan) Yasumine Kuramitsu (Japan) Masanobu Kimura	5–7, 1–6, 6–4, 6–2, 6–3
1954	(Japan) Kosei Kamo (Japan) Atsushi Miyagi	(Japan) Yatsuro Mizuki (Japan) Ayato Kamo	7–5, 6–3, 9–7
1955	(Japan) Kosei Kamo (2) (Japan) Atsushi Miyagi (2)	(Japan) Tetsuo Aoki (Japan) Hiroshi Uchida	6–0, 6–4, 6–0
1956	(Japan) Ayato Kamo (Japan) Kosei Kamo (3)	(Japan) Tadashi Matsuura (Japan) Yasunori Nakamura	9–7, 8–6, 6–4
1957	(Japan) Atsushi Miyagi (3) (Japan) Yoshihisa Shibata	(Japan) Kaname Kobayashi (Japan) Hiroshi Saito	6–3, 6–1, 6–1
1958	(United States) Ham Richardson (United States) Alex Olmedo	(Japan) Atsushi Miyagi (Japan) Yoshihisa Shibata	6–2, 6–2, 6–4
1959	(United States) Barry MacKay (United States) Myron Franks	(Japan) Atsushi Miyagi (Japan) Yoshihisa Shibata	6–2, 8–6, 6–3
1960	(Japan) Atsushi Miyagi (4) (Japan) Yoshihisa Shibata (2)	(Japan) Osamu Ishiguro (Japan) Masao Nagasaki	6–4, 7–5, 2–6, 3–6, 6–2
1961	(Japan) Michio Fujii (Japan) Kazunari Hirano	(Japan) Ichizo Konishi (Japan) Tatsuji Ishii	6–2, 7–5, 2–6, 6–2
1962	(Japan) Osamu Ishiguro (Japan) Michio Fujii (2)	(Japan) Seikichi Kan (Japan) Keishiro Yanagi	6–3, 6–2, 6–0
1963	(Japan) Jo Furuta (Japan) Ryoichi Mori	(Japan) Kosei Kamo (Japan) Osamu Ishiguro	7–9, 6–3, 16–14, 6–2
1964	(Japan) Osamu Ishiguro (2) (Japan) Isao Watanabe	(Japan) Ichizo Konishi (Japan) Koji Watanabe	6–3, 6–4, 6–3
1965	(Japan) Osamu Ishiguro (3) (Japan) Koji Watanabe	(Japan) Hiromi Arimoto (Japan) Junzo Kawamori	3–6, 6–3, 6–3, 10–8
1966	(Japan) Koji Watanabe (2) (Japan) Isao Watanabe (2)	(Japan) Osamu Ishiguro (Japan) Michio Fujii	11–9, 6–4, 6–3
1967	(Japan) Koji Watanabe (3) (Japan) Isao Watanabe (3)	(Japan) Yuji Tezuka (Japan) Hidesaburo Kuromatsu	5–7, 6–2, 6–4, 6–1
1968	(Japan) Koji Watanabe (4) (Japan) Junzo Kawamori	(Japan) Ryoichi Mori (Japan) Hideji Utsuhara	6–3, 6–2, 6–2
1969	(Japan) Isao Kobayashi (Japan) Isao Watanabe (4)	(Japan) Jun Kamiwazumi (Japan) Kenichi Hirai	4–6, 4–6, 6–1, 6–1, 6–3
1970	(Japan) Junzo Kawamori (2) (Japan) Takeshi Koura	(Italy) Martin Mulligan; M. Kaimo	6–4, 6–3, 7–9, 6–3
1971	(Japan) Jun Kamiwazumi (Japan) Toshiro Sakai	(Japan) Ryoichi Mori (Japan) Hideji Utsuhara	6–1, 10–8, 6–3
1972	(Japan) Jun Kamiwazumi (2) (Japan) Toshiro Sakai (2)	(Japan) Jun Kuki (Japan) Kenichi Hirai	6–3, 6–4, 13–11
1973	(Japan) Jun Kamiwazumi (3) (Japan) Toshiro Sakai (3)	(Japan) Kenichi Hirai (Japan) Kiyoshi Tanabe	6–3, 9–8, 6–4
1974	(Japan) Toshiro Sakai (4) (Japan) Kenichi Hirai	(Japan) Yukio Kato (Japan) Masataka Ota	6–1, 6–4, 6–2
1975	(Japan) Toshiro Sakai (5) (Japan) Kenichi Hirai (2)	(Japan) Akinori Hosono (Japan) Etsuo Uchiyama	6–4, 6–4, 6–4
1976	(Japan) Toshiro Sakai (6) (Japan) Kenichi Hirai (3)	(Japan) Tetsu Kuramitsu (Japan) Kinichi	6–3, 4–6, 1–6, 6–4, 6–3
1977	(Japan) Tetsu Kuramitsu (Japan) Kinichi	(Japan) Shinya Tamura (Japan) Yasuaki Kanai	6–4, 6–3, 6–3
1978	(Japan) Susumu Motomura (Japan) Etsuo Uchiyama	(Japan) Ryuki Yamamoto (Japan) Shinichi Sakamoto	6–3, 3–6, 4–6, 6–4, 6–2
1979	(Japan) Shigeyuki Nishio (Japan) Shinichi Sakamoto	(Japan) Kiyoshi Tanabe (Japan) Ryoichi Mori	7–5, 6–4, 7–6
1980	(Japan) Jun Kamiwazumi (4) (Japan) Tsuyoshi Fukui	(Japan) Kenichi Hirai (Japan) Shinya Tamura	6–0, 6–3, 1–6, 2–6, 6–4
1981	(Japan) Kenichi Hirai (4) (Japan) Shinichi Sakamoto (2)	(Japan) Hiroyuki Baba (Japan) Ikichiro Nakanishi	6–0, 6–7, 7–6, 6–1
1982	(Japan) Kenichi Hirai (5) (Japan) Shinichi Sakamoto (3)	(Japan) Jun Kamiwazumi (Japan) Tsuyoshi Fukui	7–6, 7–5, 6–2
1983	(Japan) Jun Kamiwazumi (5) (Japan) Kenichi Hirai (6)	(Japan) Tsuyoshi Fukui (Japan) Shinya Tamura	6–4, 7–5, 7–5
1984	(Japan) Shigeyuki Nishio (2) (Japan) Shinichi Sakamoto (4)	(Japan) Hitoshi Shirato (United States) Joel Bailey	6–3, 6–2, 7–5
1985	(Japan) Toru Yonezawa (United States) Joel Bailey	(Japan) Tsuyoshi Fukui (Japan) Shinya Tamura	6–2, 7–5
1986	(Japan) Eiji Takeuchi (Japan) Hitoshi Shirato	(Japan) Shozo Shiraishi (Japan) Shinichi Sakamoto	6–3, 6–2
1987	(Japan) Eiji Takeuchi (2) (Japan) Hitoshi Shirato (2)	(Japan) Shinichi Sakamoto (Japan) Shigeyuki Nishio	2–6, 7–5, 6–2, 6–4
1988	(Japan) Shinichi Sakamoto (5) (Japan) Shigeyuki Nishio (3)	(Japan) Takayoshi Shibuya (Japan) Takeshi Murakami	4–6, 6–2, 3–6, 6–3, 9–7
1989	(Japan) Kenichi Kiyomiya (Japan) Yosikazu Okada	(Japan) Takayoshi Shibuya (Japan) Takeshi Murakami	6–4, 6–4, 6–4
1990	(United States) Joseph Russell (United States) Joel Bailey (2)	(Japan) Hidemaru Fujita (Japan) Masaru Suizu	5–7, 6–1, 6–7(8), 7–6(6), 6–4
1991	(Japan) Eduardo Furusho (Japan) Tetsuya Sato	(Japan) Ryuso Tsujino (Japan) Natsuki Harada	6–4, 6–3, 6–3
1992	(Japan) Tetsuya Sato (2) (Japan) Toshiyuki Mori	(United States) Joseph Russell (Japan) Toru Yonezawa	6–1, 4–6, 6–4, 6–4
1993	(Japan) Tetsuya Sato (3) (Japan) Takao Suzuki	(Japan) Ryuso Tsujino (Japan) Haruo Nakano	6–3, 3–6, 7–5, 2–6, 6–3
1994	(Japan) Hiroyasu Sato (Japan) Masafumi Komada	(Japan) Haruo Nakano (Japan) Tetsuya Sato	7–5, 6–4
1995	(Japan) Gouichi Motomura (Japan) Tetsuya Sato (4)	(Japan) Takao Suzuki (Japan) Satoshi Iwabuchi	7–6(6), 6–2
1996	(Japan) Gouichi Motomura (2) (Japan) Thomas Shimada	(Japan) Takao Suzuki (Japan) Satoshi Iwabuchi	6–4, 6–2
1997	(Japan) Satoshi Iwabuchi (Japan) Takao Suzuki	(Japan) Yaoki Ishii (Japan) Mitsuru Takada	6–3, 6–4
1998	(Japan) Hiroki Ishii (Japan) Ryuso Tsujino	(Japan) Yaoki Ishii (Japan) Tetsuya Chaen	6–3, 6–3
1999	(Japan) Satoshi Iwabuchi (2) (Japan) Thomas Shimada (2)	(Japan) Hideki Kaneko (Japan) Takahiro Terachi	6–1, 6–0
2000	(Japan) Satoshi Iwabuchi (3) (Japan) Mitsuru Takada	(Japan) Michihisa Onoda (Japan) Hideki Kaneko	1–6, 6–3, 6–4
2001	(Japan) Yaoki Ishii (Japan) Akira Matsushita	(Japan) Hiroki Kondo (Japan) Thomas Shimada	6–4, 6–2
2002	(Japan) Satoshi Iwabuchi (4) (Japan) Mitsuru Takada (2)	(Japan) Jun Kato (Japan) Thomas Shimada	7–6(4), 7–6(5), 6–4
2003	(Japan) Takahiro Terachi (Japan) Thomas Shimada (3)	(Japan) Jun Kato (Japan) Kentaro Masuda	6–4, 7–6(4), 6–4
2004	(Japan) Hiroyasu Sato (2) (Japan) Reimi	(Japan) Tasuku Iwami (Japan) Go Soeda	7–5, 6–4
2005	(Japan) Satoshi Iwabuchi (5) (Japan) Toshihide Matsui	(Japan) Tasuku Iwami (Japan) Go Soeda	6–4, 3–6, 6–3
2006	(Japan) Yaoki Ishii (2) (Japan) Hiroki Kondo	(Japan) Reimi (Japan) Hiroyasu Sato	6–4, 6–2
2007	(Japan) Satoshi Iwabuchi (6) (Japan) Toshihide Matsui (2)	(Japan) Yusuke Iwahashi (Japan) Tomohiro Mori	6–3, 7–6(3)
2008	(Japan) Satoshi Iwabuchi (7) (Japan) Toshihide Matsui (3)	(Japan) Tatsuma Ito (South Korea) Kwon Oh-hee	6–4, 6–3
2009	(Japan) Satoshi Iwabuchi (8) (Japan) Toshihide Matsui (4)	(Japan) Tasuku Iwami (Japan) Go Soeda	2–6, 7–6(3), 6–2
2010	(Japan) Tasuku Iwami (Japan) Hiroki Kondo (2)	(Japan) Fumiaki Kita (Japan) Takuto Niki	6–2, 6–2
2011	(Japan) Tatsuma Ito (Japan) Hiroki Kondo (3)	(Japan) Yasutaka Uchiyama (Japan) Yūichi Sugita	6–3, 7–5
2012	(Japan) Yasutaka Uchiyama (Japan) Shota Tagawa	(Japan) Tatsuma Ito (Japan) Hiroki Kondo	7–6(3), 6–3
2013	(Japan) Sho Katayama (Japan) Bumpei Sato	(Japan) Hiroyasu Ehara (Japan) Koichi Sano	6–2, 6–4
2014	(Japan) Takuto Niki (Japan) Yuya Kibi	(Japan) Bumpei Sato (Japan) Sho Katayama	7–5, 6–3
2015	(Japan) Yusuke Watanuki (Japan) Yosuke Watanuki	(Japan) Koichi Sano (Japan) Arata Onozawa	6–2, 6–1
2016	(Japan) Hiromasa Oku (Japan) Katsumi Nagao	(Japan) Yusuke Watanuki (Japan) Yosuke Watanuki	6–3, 6–4
2017	(Japan) Hiroyasu Ehara (Japan) Sho Katayama	(Japan) Soichiro Moritani (Japan) Kento Takeuchi	6–2, 6–4
2018	(Japan) Takuto Niki (2) (Japan) Shintaro Imai	(Japan) Yuta Shimizu (Japan) Shinji Hazawa	6–2, 7–6(5)
2019	(Japan) Takuto Niki (3) (Japan) Shintaro Imai (2)	(Japan) Yuta Shimizu (Japan) Shinji Hazawa	7–6(3), 7–6(9)
2020	Not held due to COVID-19 pandemic		
2021	(Japan) Kaito Uesugi (Japan) Toshihide Matsui (5)	(Japan) Yuta Shimizu (Japan) Shinji Hazawa	6–1, 7–6(3)
2022	(Japan) Kaito Uesugi (2) (Japan) Toshihide Matsui (6)	(Japan) Takuto Niki (Japan) Takeru Yuzuki	6–3, 6–4
2023	(Japan) Taisei Ichikawa (Japan) Seita Watanabe	(Japan) Ryotaro Taguchi (Japan) Shinji Hazawa	6–3, 6–2
2024	(Japan) Takeru Yuzuki (Japan) Seita Watanabe (2)	(Japan) Kaito Uesugi (Japan) Masakatsu Noguchi	6–4, 6–7(8), [10–3]

=== Women's doubles ===
Year	Champion	Runner-up	Score
1924			
1925			
1926			
1927			
1928			
1929			
1930			
1931			
1932			
1933			
1934			
1935			
1936			
1937			
1938			
1939			
1940			
1941	Not held		
1942			
1943–45	Not held		
1946			
1947			
1948			
1949			
1950			
1951			
1952			
1953			
1954			
1955			
1956			
1957			
1958			
1959			
1960			
1961			
1962			
1963			
1964			
1965			
1966			
1967			
1968			
1969			
1970			
1971			
1972			
1973			
1974			
1975			
1976			
1977			
1978			
1979			
1980			
1981			
1982			
1983			
1984			
1985			
1986			
1987			
1988			
1989			
1990			
1991			
1992			
1993			
1994			
1995			
1996			
1997			
1998			
1999			
2000			
2001			
2002			
2003			
2004			
2005			
2006			
2007			
2008			
2009			
2010			
2011			
2012			
2013			
2014			
2015			
2016			
2017			
2018			
2019			
2020	Not held due to COVID-19 pandemic		
2021			
2022			
2023			
2024			

=== Mixed doubles ===
Year	Champion	Runner-up	Score
1935	(Japan) Tamio Abe (Japan)	(Japan) Hyotaro Sato (Japan)	
1936	(Japan) Yasuo Murakami (Japan)	(Japan) Yoshioka (Japan)	
1937	(Japan) Ryuki Miki (Japan)	(Japan) Tamio Abe (Japan)	
1938	(Japan) Tamio Abe (2) (Japan)	(Empire of Japan) Mi Kawaji (Japan)	Def.
1939	(Japan) Kenzo Uhara (Japan)	(Empire of Japan) Murayama (Japan)	
1940	(Japan) Yasuo Murakami (2) (Japan)	(Empire of Japan) Haruo Horikoshi (Japan)	
1941–45	Not held		
1946	(Japan) Yatsuro Mizuki (Japan)	(Japan) Kenzo Uhara (Japan)	
1947	(Japan) Kenzo Uhara (2) (Japan)	(Japan) Goro Fujikura (Japan)	
1948	(Japan) Yatsuro Mizuki (2) (Japan)	(Japan) Yasuo Tsuruta (Japan)	
1949	(Japan) Kosei Kamo (Japan)	(Japan) Yasuo Tsuruta (Japan)	
1950	(Japan) Kosei Kamo (2) (Japan)	(Empire of Japan) Mi Kawaji (Japan)	
1951	(Japan) Kenzo Uhara (3) (Japan)	(Japan) Kosei Kamo (Japan)	
1952	(Japan) Kenzo Uhara (4) (Japan)	(Japan) Jiro Yamagishi (Japan)	
1953	(Japan) Kenzo Uhara (5) (Japan)	(Japan) Norichika Watanabe (Japan)	
1954	(Japan) Kenzo Uhara (6) (Japan)	(Japan) Kosei Kamo (Japan)	
1955	(Japan) Kosei Kamo (3) (Japan)	(Japan) Kenzo Uhara (Japan)	
1956	(Japan) Kosei Kamo (4) (Japan)	(Japan) Kenzo Uhara (Japan)	
1957	(Japan) Yoshihisa Shibata (Japan)	(Japan) Kaname Kobayashi (Japan)	
1958	(Japan) Kenzo Uhara (7) (Japan)	(Japan) Yuji Takayama (Japan)	
1959	(Japan) Kenzo Uhara (8) (Japan)	(Japan) Takayoshi Saigo (Japan)	
1960	(Japan) Michihiro Suzuki (Japan)	(Japan) Kenzo Uhara (Japan)	
1961			
1962			
1963			
1964			
1965			
1966			
1967			
1968			
1969			
1970			
1971			
1972			
1973			
1974			
1975			
1976			
1977			
1978			
1979			
1980			
1981			
1982			
1983			
1984			
1985			
1986			
1987			
1988			
1989			
1990			
1991			
1992			
1993			
1994			
1995			
1996			
1997			
1998			
1999			
2000			
2001			
2002			
2003			
2004			
2005			
2006			
2007			
2008			
2009			
2010			
2011			
2012			
2013			
2014			
2015			ret.
2016			
2017			
2018			
2019			
2020–	Not held due to COVID-19 pandemic, no signal of resumption		
