= List of Japan Davis Cup team representatives =

This is a list of tennis players who have represented the Japan Davis Cup team in an official Davis Cup match. Japan have taken part in the competition since 1921.

== Players ==
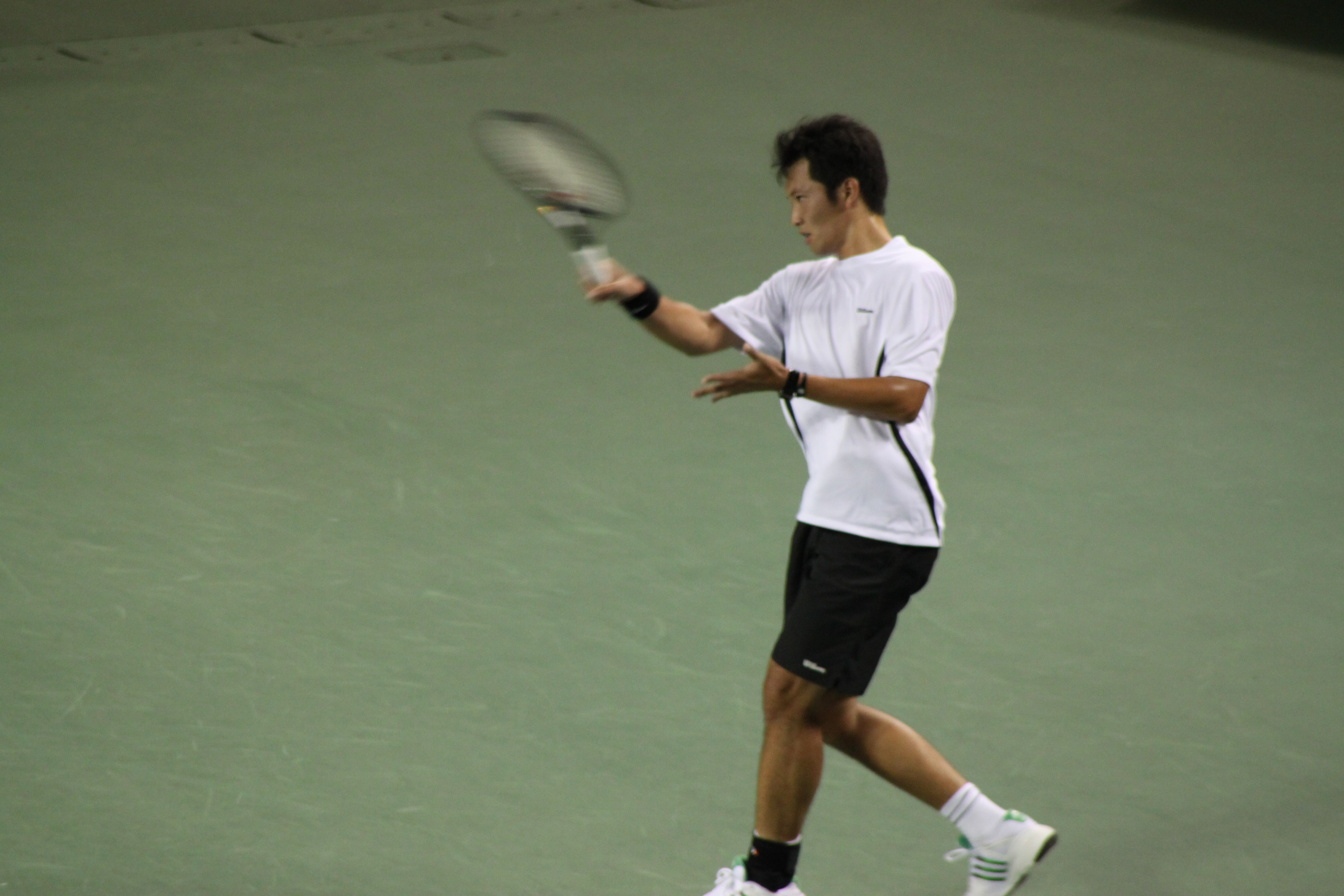
Tatsuma Ito

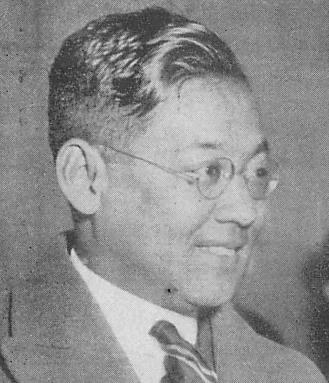
Ichiya Kumagae

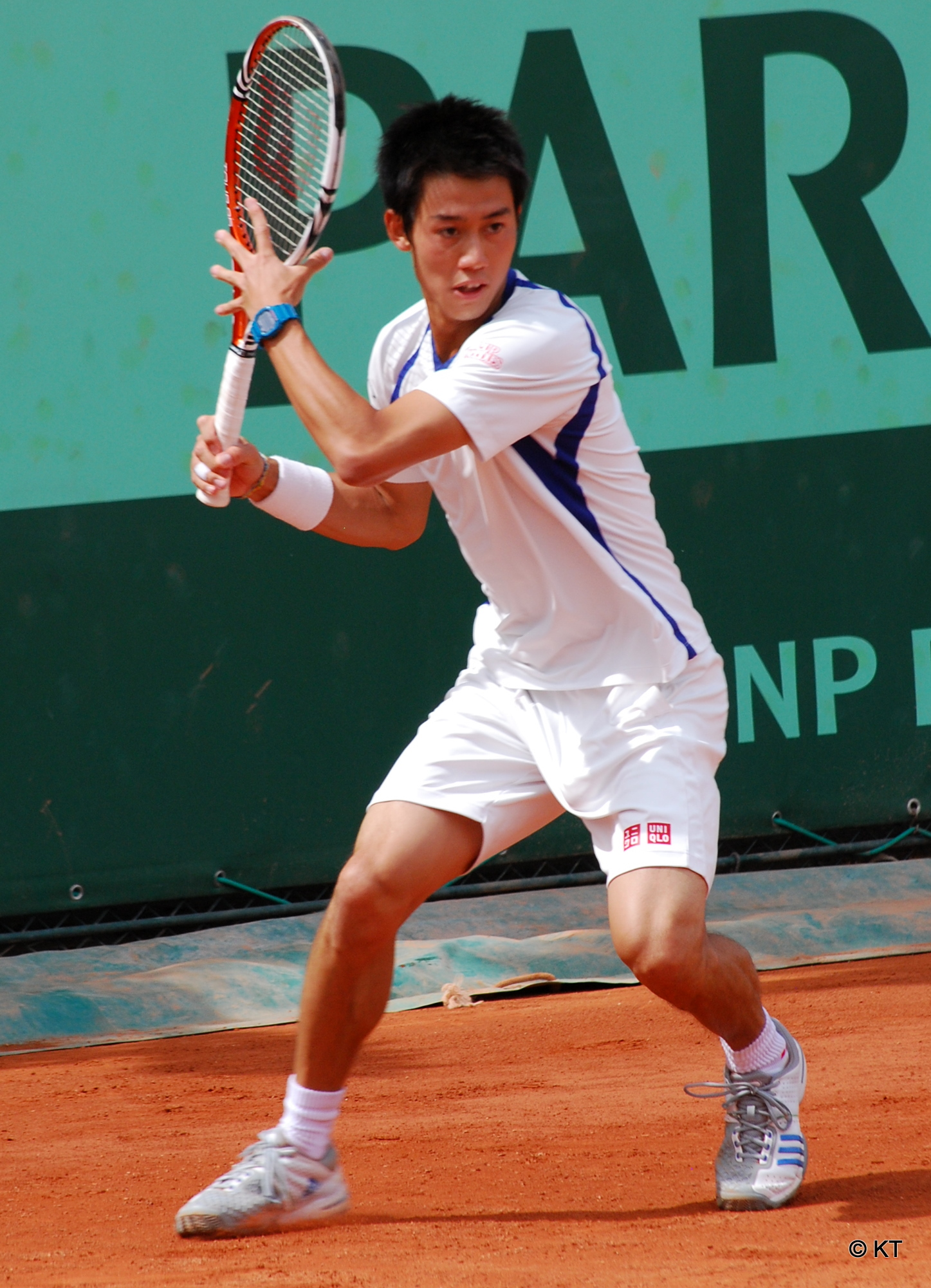
Kei Nishikori

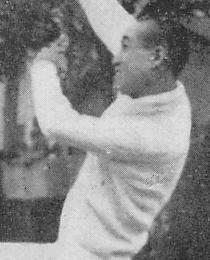
Jiro Sato

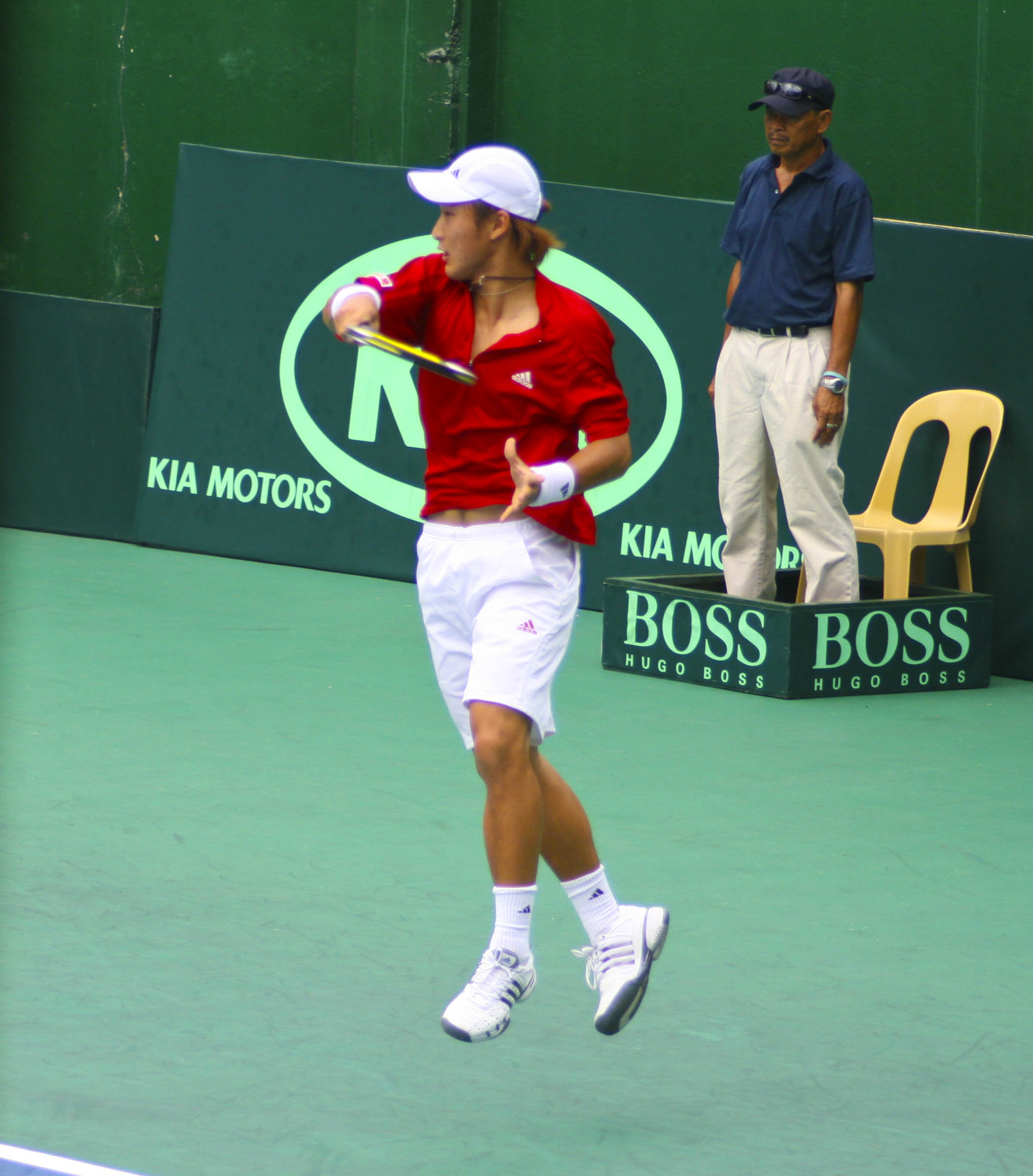
Go Soeda

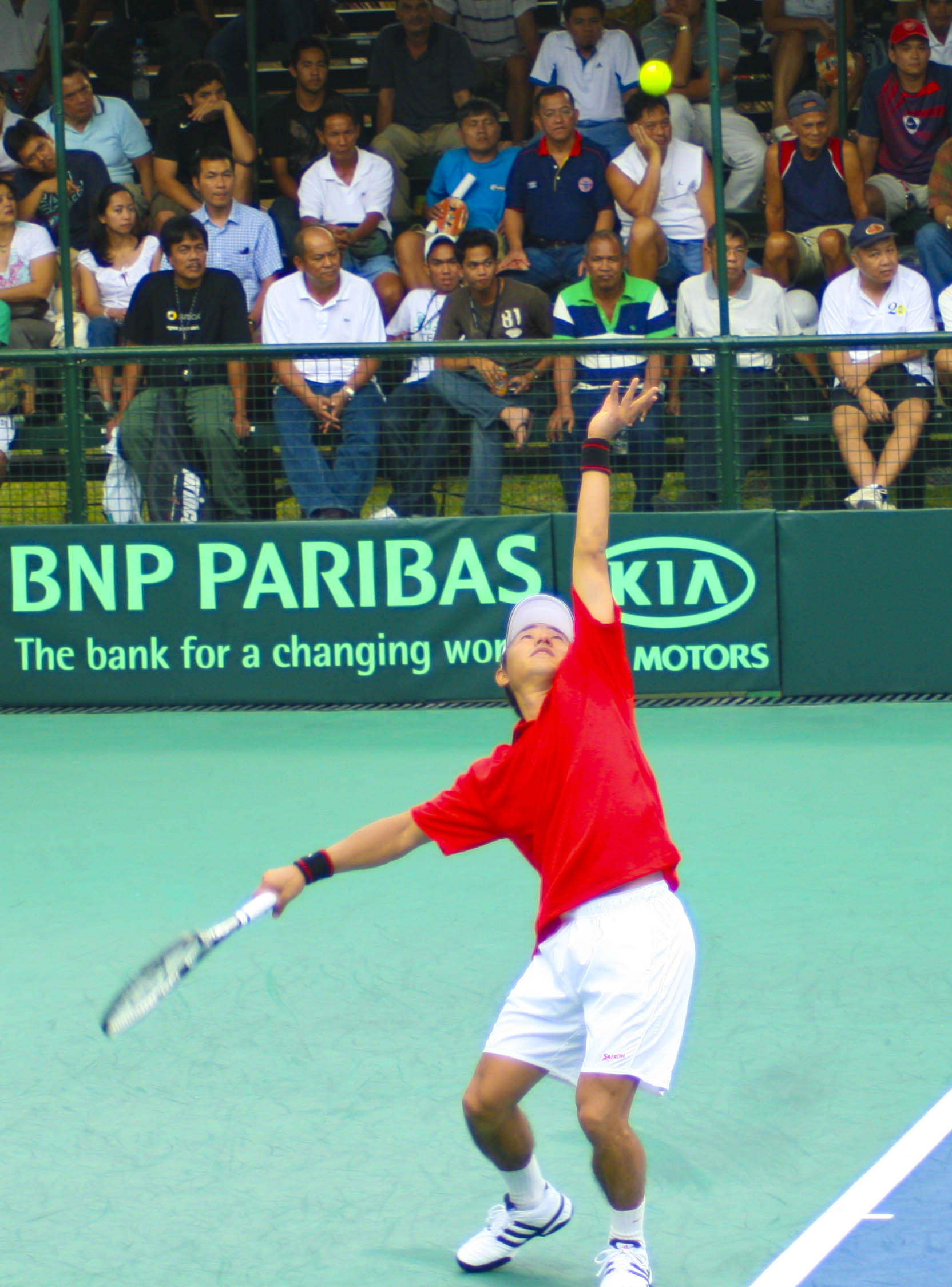
Takao Suzuki

Player	W-L (Total)	W-L (Singles)	W-L (Doubles)	Ties	Debut
Tamio Abe	5–8	0–4	5–4	9	1928
Taro Daniel	3-5	3-5	0-0	5	2014
Michio Fujii	6–2	3–0	3–2	5	1962
Goro Fujikura	0–1	0–0	0–1	1	1951
Jiro Fujikura	1–1	1–1	0–0	1	1934
Masanosuke Fukuda	2–3	2–3	0–0	3	1923
Tsuyoshi Fukui	28–14	27–12	1–2	22	1978
Eduardo Furusho	1–2	0–1	1–1	3	1991
Yuzuru Furuta	2–0	2–0	0–0	1	1960
Takeichi Harada	27–12	19–4	8–8	16	1924
Kenichi Hirai	21–12	11–4	10–8	19	1973
Akira Ichiyama	1–0	0–0	1–0	1	1960
Osamu Ishiguro	19–19	15–16	4–3	17	1958
Yaoki Ishii	3–2	3–2	0–0	3	2000
Tatsuma Ito	8–12	7–7	1–5	13	2009
Satoshi Iwabuchi	13–9	2–1	11–8	20	1995
Jun Kamiwazumi	20–16	12–8	8–8	20	1968
Kosei Kamo	14–15	11–9	3–6	11	1953
Hideki Kaneko	3–4	3–4	0–0	4	1996
Seiichiro Kashio	1–1	0–0	1–1	2	1923
Sachio Kato	4–1	2–1	2–0	3	1975
Jun Kato	0–2	0–1	0–1	1	2003
Minoru Kawachi	3–2	1–1	2–1	3	1931
Junzo Kawamori	2–2	0–0	2–2	4	1969
Masanobu Kimura	0–1	0–1	0–0	1	1953
Kenichi Kiyomiya	0–1	0–0	0–1	1	1988
Isao Kobayashi	5–2	4–2	1–0	4	1967
Hiroki Kondo	0–1	0–0	0–1	1	2011
Ichizo Konishi	8–4	8–4	0–0	6	1965
Takeshi Koura	1–2	0–0	1–2	3	1970
Jun Kuki	11–6	11–6	0–0	9	1971
Ichiya Kumagai	5–4	4–2	1–2	3	1921
Jiro Kumamaru	0–4	0–3	0–1	2	1951
Hidesaburo Kuromatsu	1–0	0–0	1–0	1	1970
Takeo Kuwabara	5–1	5–1	0–0	3	1932
Kaoru Maruyama	0–2	0–2	0–0	1	1985
Toshihide Matsui	4–1	2–0	2–1	3	2006
Shuzo Matsuoka	23–13	21–10	2–3	16	1987
Susumu Matsuura	2–1	2–1	0–0	2	1959
Tatsuyoshi Miki	3–0	0–0	3–0	3	1932
Atsushi Miyagi	18–21	12–12	6–9	16	1952
Hiroki Moriya	0-1	0-0	0-1	1	2013
Mitsuru Motoi	2–0	1–0	1–0	1	1965
Gouichi Motomura	24–17	21–16	3–1	23	1993
Masao Nagasaki	2–4	0–2	2–2	4	1960
Fumiteru Nakano	3–10	2–6	1–4	5	1937
Haruo Nakano	1–2	0–2	1–0	1	1989
Kei Nishikori	20–3	17–3	3–0	12	2008
Hideo Nishimura	3–4	2–2	1–2	3	1934
Shigeyuki Nishio	11–7	6–5	5–2	13	1977
Yoshihito Nishioka	2-4	2-2	0-2	4	2015
Ryosuki Nunoi	9–3	6–2	3–1	4	1933
Tunetake Okadome	1–0	1–0	0–0	1	1957
Sunao Okamoto	2–4	2–2	0–2	2	1924
Shigeru Ota	2–3	1–1	1–2	4	1988
Yoshiro Ota	12–9	12–8	0–1	12	1927
Toshiro Sakai	20–17	15–12	5–5	19	1968
Shinichi Sakamoto	4–4	2–2	2–2	6	1980
Tetsuya Sato	1–3	0–1	1–2	3	1991
Hyotaro Sato	6–2	6–2	0–0	5	1930
Jiro Satoh	22–6	14–4	8–2	10	1931
Yoshihisa Shibata	3–2	1–0	2–2	4	1958
Thomas Shimada	7–9	0–0	7–9	16	1994
Zenzo Shimizu	12–13	9–8	3–5	10	1921
Shozo Shiraishi	6–7	6–7	0–0	7	1984
Hitoshi Shirato	7–7	3–3	4–4	10	1982
Go Soeda	25–12	23–10	2–2	21	2005
Seikichi Suga	1–0	1–0	0–0	1	1962
Yūichi Sugita	6–9	5–4	1–5	12	2007
Takao Suzuki	41–23	27–12	14–11	31	1995
Kiyotaka Tachibana	0–1	0–0	0–1	1	1987
Eiji Takeuchi	3–6	1–2	2–4	7	1982
Masayoshi Takeyari	0–2	0–0	0–2	2	1987
Kiyoshi Tanabe	3–2	1–2	2–0	4	1974
Hidehiko Tanizawa	0–2	0–2	0–0	1	1990
Tsumio Tawara	8–3	5–2	3–1	4	1926
Takahiro Terachi	2–3	0–1	2–2	4	2002
Yuji Tezuka	3–0	1–0	2–0	2	1970
Teizo Toba	7–4	4–2	3–2	7	1926
Toshihisa Tsuchihashi	5–3	5–3	0–0	4	1986
Toshiyuki Tsuji	0–1	0–0	0–1	1	1984
Ryuso Tsujino	2–4	0–2	2–2	5	1992
Yasutaka Uchiyama	4-7	2-1	2-6	8	2013
Koji Watanabe	28–16	18–11	10–5	18	1963
Isao Watanabe	5–3	1–0	4–3	7	1967
Jiro Yamagishi	8–10	6–6	2–4	6	1934
Yasufumi Yamamoto	9–5	9–5	0–0	7	1992
Takao Yamamoto	3–0	3–0	0–0	3	1978
Keishiro Yanagi	8–3	8–3	0–0	6	1967
Toru Yonezawa	5–5	1–0	4–5	9	1981
