= Satoshi Iwabuchi =

Japanese tennis player (born 1975)

- Country (sports): Japan
- Residence: Kanagawa, Japan
- Born: 7 October 1975 (age 50) Kanagawa, Japan
- Height: 1.75 m (5 ft 9 in)
- Plays: Left-handed
- Prize money: $329,243

Singles
- Career record: 6-17
- Career titles: 0
- Highest ranking: No. 223 (20 October 2003)

Grand Slam singles results
- Australian Open: Q2 (1996, 2007)
- French Open: Q1 (2000, 2003)
- Wimbledon: Q3 (1998)
- US Open: Q2 (1999)

Doubles
- Career record: 28–26
- Career titles: 1
- Highest ranking: No. 125 (11 September 2006)

Grand Slam doubles results
- Australian Open: 1R (2006)
- Wimbledon: 1R (2000)

Other doubles tournaments
- Olympic Games: 2R (1996)
- Last updated on: 6 October 2021.

Satoshi Iwabuchi (岩渕 聡, Iwabuchi Satoshi; born October 7, 1975) is a retired professional tennis player from Japan.

Iwabuchi won one ATP Tour doubles title in his career, the 2005 Japan Open, where he and Takao Suzuki defeated Simon Aspelin and Todd Perry in straight sets 5–4^{(3)}, 5–4^{(13)}.

As of May 17, 2009, Iwabuchi's highest singles ranking was world number 223, which he reached on October 20, 2003.

== Grand Slam tournaments Performance timeline ==
Key
W	F	SF	QF	#R	RR	Q#	DNQ	A	NH

(W) winner; (F) finalist; (SF) semifinalist; (QF) quarterfinalist; (#R) rounds 4, 3, 2, 1; (RR) round-robin stage; (Q#) qualification round; (DNQ) did not qualify; (A) absent; (NH) not held; (SR) strike rate (events won / competed); (W–L) win–loss record.

=== Singles ===
Tournament	1996	1997	1998	1999	2000	2001	2002	2003	2004	2005	2006	2007	W–L	Win %
Grand Slam tournaments
Australian Open	Q2	A	A					A			Q1	Q2	0–0	–
French Open				A	Q1		A	Q1					0–0	–
Wimbledon		A	Q3	Q2	Q1	A							0–0	–
US Open				Q2	A			Q1					0–0	–
Win–loss												0–0	0–0	–

== ATP career finals ==
=== Doubles: 1 (1 title) ===
Legend Grand Slam tournaments (0–0) ATP World Tour Finals (0–0) ATP World Tour Masters Series(0–0) ATP World Tour Championship Series (1–0) ATP World Tour World Series (0–0)	Titles by surface Hard (1–0) Clay (0–0) Grass (0–0) Carpet (0–0)	Titles by setting Outdoor (1–0) Indoor (0–0)

Result	W–L	Date	Tournament	Tier	Surface	Partner	Opponents	Score
Win	1–0	Oct 2005	Tokyo, Japan	Championship Series	Hard	(Japan) Takao Suzuki	(Sweden) Simon Aspelin (Australia) Todd Perry	5–4^{(7–3)}, 5–4^{(15–13)}

== ATP Challenger and ITF Futures finals ==
=== Singles: 28 (21–7) ===
Legend ATP Challenger (1–0) ITF Futures (20–7)	Finals by surface Hard (16–4) Clay (2–0) Grass (0–1) Carpet (3–2)

Result	W–L	Date	Tournament	Tier	Surface	Opponent	Score
Win	1–0	Nov 1998	Japan F6, Saitama	Futures	Hard	(Japan) Akira Matsushita	6–4, 6–3
Win	2–0	May 1999	Japan F3, Fukuoka	Futures	Hard	(Japan) Takahiro Terachi	6–2, 7–5
Win	3–0	May 1999	Japan F4, Fukuoka	Futures	Hard	(South Korea) Kwon Oh-Hee	6–3, 6–3
Loss	3–1	Jun 2001	Canada F2, Montreal	Futures	Hard	(France) Benjamin Cassaigne	3–6, 6–7^{(2–7)}
Loss	3–2	Jan 2002	USA F1, Aventura	Futures	Hard	(Switzerland) Yves Allegro	6–4, 1–6, 5–7
Win	4–2	Mar 2002	Australia F1, Devonport	Futures	Hard	(Slovakia) Ladislav Svarc	6–3, 3–6, 7–6^{(9–7)}
Loss	4–3	Apr 2002	Japan F3, Takamori	Futures	Carpet	(Japan) Michihisa Onoda	6–7^{(6–8)}, 2–6
Loss	4–4	Jan 2003	India F1, Lucknow	Futures	Grass	(Bulgaria) Todor Enev	2–6, 2–6
Win	5–4	Mar 2003	Burnie, Australia	Challenger	Hard	(Australia) Paul Baccanello	6–2, 6–3
Win	6–4	May 2004	Japan F3, Tokyo	Futures	Hard	(United States) David Martin	2–6, 6–3, 6–3
Win	7–4	Sep 2004	Japan F6, Kashiwa	Futures	Hard	(Chinese Taipei) Ti Chen	6–4, 6–2
Win	8–4	Sep 2004	Japan F7, Tokyo	Futures	Hard	(Japan) Michihisa Onoda	6–1, 4–6, 6–4
Win	9–4	Apr 2005	Japan F1, Kofu	Futures	Carpet	(South Korea) Im Kyu-Tae	6–2, 7–6^{(8–6)}
Win	10–4	Apr 2005	Japan F2, Hokuto	Futures	Clay	(United States) David Martin	6–3, 7–5
Win	11–4	May 2005	Korea F2, Seogwipo	Futures	Hard	(South Korea) Im Kyu-Tae	2–6, 6–2, 6–3
Loss	11–5	Jun 2005	Japan F6, Kusatsu	Futures	Carpet	(Japan) Atsuo Ogawa	6–7^{(5–7)}, 6–7^{(3–7)}
Win	12–5	Feb 2006	Australia F2, Wollongong	Futures	Hard	(United Kingdom) Jamie Baker	6–2, 7–6^{(7–4)}
Win	13–5	Apr 2006	Japan F1, Tokyo	Futures	Hard	(South Korea) Kwon Oh-Hee	6–4, 4–6, 6–1
Win	14–5	Jun 2006	Japan F6, Karuizawa	Futures	Clay	(Australia) Adam Kennedy	6–2, 6–4
Win	15–5	Jun 2006	Japan F7, Kusatsu	Futures	Carpet	(Japan) Yuichi Sugita	7–5, 6–2
Win	16–5	Oct 2006	Japan F11, Kashiwa	Futures	Hard	(United States) Nicholas Monroe	6–4, 6–1
Win	17–5	May 2007	Korea F3, Gimcheon	Futures	Hard	(Japan) Go Soeda	6–1, 2–6, 6–3
Win	18–5	Sep 2007	Great Britain F16, Fox Hills	Futures	Hard	(United Kingdom) Alexander Slabinsky	6–3, 6–2
Win	19–5	Oct 2007	Japan F10, Kashiwa	Futures	Hard	(Japan) Gouichi Motomura	6–3, 6–3
Loss	19–6	Apr 2008	China F4, Taizhou	Futures	Hard	(China) Zhe Li	6–2, 5–7, 5–7
Win	20–6	May 2008	Korea F3, Daegu	Futures	Hard	(South Korea) Im Kyu-Tae	6–0, 7–6^{(7–2)}
Loss	20–7	May 2008	Korea F4, Seogwipo	Futures	Hard	(South Korea) Dylan Seong-Kwan Kim	7–5, 3–6, ret.
Win	21–7	Sep 2008	Japan F9, Sapporo	Futures	Carpet	(Japan) Gouichi Motomura	6–2, 6–3

=== Doubles: 31 (14–17) ===
Legend ATP Challenger (7–6) ITF Futures (7–11)	Finals by surface Hard (8–14) Clay (3–0) Grass (1–1) Carpet (2–2)

Result	W–L	Date	Tournament	Tier	Surface	Partner	Opponents	Score
Win	1–0	Apr 1996	Nagoya, Japan	Challenger	Hard	(Japan) Takao Suzuki	(Australia) Ben Ellwood (Australia) Peter Tramacchi	7–6, 7–6
Loss	1–1	Feb 1997	Kyoto, Japan	Challenger	Carpet	(Japan) Takao Suzuki	(India) Mahesh Bhupathi (Zimbabwe) Wayne Black	4–6, 7–6, 1–6
Win	2–1	Aug 1998	Belo Horizonte, Brazil	Challenger	Hard	(Japan) Thomas Shimada	(South Africa) Jeff Coetzee (South Africa) Damien Roberts	6–7, 7–5, 7–5
Win	3–1	May 1999	Japan F4, Fukuoka	Futures	Hard	(Japan) Mitsuru Takada	(Japan) Tetsuya Chaen (Japan) Tasuku Iwami	6–4, 6–4
Win	4–1	Jul 1999	Córdoba, Spain	Challenger	Hard	(Uzbekistan) Oleg Ogorodov	(Israel) Noam Behr (Israel) Eyal Erlich	6–3, 6–2
Loss	4–2	Oct 1999	Indonesia F5, Jakarta	Futures	Hard	(Japan) Hideki Kaneko	(Japan) Thomas Shimada (South Africa) Myles Wakefield	2–6, 7–6, 6–7
Win	5–2	Nov 1999	Yokohama, Japan	Challenger	Carpet	(Japan) Thomas Shimada	(United States) Michael Joyce (United Kingdom) Kyle Spencer	6–2, 6–4
Win	6–2	Dec 1999	Jaipur, India	Challenger	Grass	(Czech Republic) Tomas Anzari	(Croatia) Ivo Karlović (Russia) Yuri Schukin	7–6, 4–6, 7–6
Win	7–2	Mar 2000	Bombay, India	Challenger	Hard	(Czech Republic) Tomas Anzari	(France) Maxime Boyé (Israel) Eyal Erlich	7–6^{(11–9)}, 6–4
Loss	7–3	Mar 2000	Kyoto, Japan	Challenger	Carpet	(Japan) Yaoki Ishii	(Slovakia) Martin Hromec (United Kingdom) Tom Spinks	4–6, 6–7^{(5–7)}
Loss	7–4	May 2000	Uzbekistan F2, Namangan	Futures	Hard	(Japan) Yaoki Ishii	(Israel) Jonathan Erlich (Israel) Lior Mor	2–6, 6–4, 4–6
Win	8–4	Sep 2001	Japan F6, Kashiwa	Futures	Hard	(Japan) Mitsuru Takada	(Japan) Katsushi Fukuda (Germany) Benedikt Stronk	6–4, 7–5
Loss	8–5	Jan 2003	India F1, Lucknow	Futures	Grass	(South Korea) Kim Dong-Hyun	(Indonesia) Peter Handoyo (Indonesia) Suwandi Suwandi	4–6, 2–6
Loss	8–6	Feb 2003	Great Britain F3, Southampton	Futures	Hard	(Japan) Michihisa Onoda	(United Kingdom) Jonathan Marray (United Kingdom) David Sherwood	3–6, 5–7
Loss	8–7	Apr 2004	Busan, South Korea	Challenger	Hard	(Japan) Tasuku Iwami	(Thailand) Sanchai Ratiwatana (Thailand) Sonchat Ratiwatana	7–6^{(7–5)}, 6–7^{(1–7)}, 4–6
Loss	8–8	Feb 2005	New Zealand F1, Hamilton	Futures	Hard	(Japan) Hiroyasu Sato	(United States) Scott Lipsky (Sweden) Alexander Hartman	6–7^{(5–7)}, 3–6
Win	9–8	Jun 2006	Japan F6, Karuizawa	Futures	Clay	(Japan) Yaoki Ishii	(Japan) Katsushi Fukuda (Japan) Yuichi Ito	6–3, 6–0
Win	10–8	Aug 2006	Samarkand, Uzbekistan	Challenger	Clay	(Japan) Gouichi Motomura	(South Korea) Jun Woong-sun (Germany) Frank Moser	2–6, 6–2, [10–5]
Loss	10–9	May 2007	Korea F2, Daegu	Futures	Hard	(Japan) Toshihide Matsui	(China) Yu Xinyuan (China) Zeng Shaoxuan	3–6, 7–5, 3–6
Loss	10–10	Jul 2007	Granby, Canada	Challenger	Hard	(United States) Philip Stolt	(Thailand) Sanchai Ratiwatana (Thailand) Sonchat Ratiwatana	2–6, 6–7^{(4–7)}
Loss	10–11	Sep 2007	Great Britain F16, Fox Hills	Futures	Hard	(Japan) Yaoki Ishii	(United Kingdom) Robert Searle (United Kingdom) Ken Skupski	6–4, 3–6, 4–6
Loss	10–12	Nov 2007	Yokohama, Japan	Challenger	Hard	(Japan) Toshihide Matsui	(Japan) Go Soeda (Japan) Hiroki Kondo	7–6^{(7–5)}, 3–6, [9–11]
Loss	10–13	Jan 2008	Waikoloa, United States	Challenger	Hard	(Japan) Go Soeda	(United States) Scott Lipsky (United States) David Martin	4–6, 7–5, [7–10]
Loss	10–14	May 2008	Korea F3, Daegu	Futures	Hard	(Japan) Toshihide Matsui	(South Korea) Kim Young-Jun (South Korea) Kwon Oh-Hee	6–3, 6–7^{(5–7)}, [7–10]
Win	11–14	Sep 2008	Japan F9, Sapporo	Futures	Carpet	(Japan) Ko Suzuki	(Japan) Hiroki Kondo (Japan) Takahiro Terachi	6–3, 1–6, [10–7]
Win	12–14	Mar 2009	Japan F2, Tokyo	Futures	Hard	(Japan) Gouichi Motomura	(Japan) Sho Aida (Japan) Bumpei Sato	6–2, 4–6, [10–8]
Win	13–14	Apr 2009	Korea F2, Seogwipo	Futures	Hard	(Japan) Gouichi Motomura	(China) Zhe Li (France) Clement Reix	6–3, 6–4
Win	14–14	Jun 2009	Japan F4, Karuizawa	Futures	Clay	(Japan) Hiroki Kondo	(Japan) Tasuku Iwami (Japan) Hiroyasu Sato	7–6^{(7–5)}, 6–2
Loss	14–15	Jul 2009	Korea F5, Gyeongsan	Futures	Hard	(Japan) Gouichi Motomura	(Chinese Taipei) Chen Ti (Chinese Taipei) Yang Tsung-Hua	6–7^{(4–7)}, 4–6
Loss	14–16	Jul 2009	Korea F6, Gyeongsan	Futures	Hard	(Chinese Taipei) Chen Ti	(Chinese Taipei) Lee Hsin-Han (Chinese Taipei) Yang Tsung-Hua	6–7^{(4–7)}, 7–5, [8–10]
Loss	14–17	Aug 2009	Thailand F1, Nonthaburi	Futures	Hard	(Japan) Gouichi Motomura	(Canada) Milos Raonic (Austria) Nikolaus Moser	6–0, 6–7^{(2–7)}, [3–10]

== Performance timeline ==
Key
W	F	SF	QF	#R	RR	Q#	DNQ	A	NH

(W) winner; (F) finalist; (SF) semifinalist; (QF) quarterfinalist; (#R) rounds 4, 3, 2, 1; (RR) round-robin stage; (Q#) qualification round; (DNQ) did not qualify; (A) absent; (NH) not held; (SR) strike rate (events won / competed); (W–L) win–loss record.

=== Singles ===
Tournament	1996	1997	1998	1999	2000	2001	2002	2003	2004	2005	2006	2007	SR	W–L	Win %
Grand Slam tournaments
Australian Open	Q2	Q1	A	A	Q1	A	A	A	A	A	Q1	Q2	0 / 0	0–0	–
French Open	A	A	A	A	Q1	A	A	Q1	A	A	A	A	0 / 0	0–0	–
Wimbledon	A	A	Q3	Q2	Q1	A	A	Q2	A	A	A	Q2	0 / 0	0–0	–
US Open	Q1	Q1	A	Q2	A	A	A	Q1	A	A	A	A	0 / 0	0–0	–
Win–loss	0–0	0–0	0–0	0–0	0–0	0–0	0–0	0–0	0–0	0–0	0–0	0–0	0 / 0	0–0	–

=== Doubles ===
Tournament	2000	2001	2002	2003	2004	2005	2006	SR	W–L	Win %
Grand Slam tournaments
Australian Open								0 / 0	0–0	–
French Open								0 / 0	0–0	–
Wimbledon								0 / 0	0–0	–
US Open								0 / 0	0–0	–
Win–loss	0–0	0–0	0–0	0–0	0–0	0–0	0–0	0 / 0	0–0	–
