= Jun Kato =

Japanese tennis player (born 1980)

- Full name: Jun Kato
- Country (sports): Japan
- Born: 25 October 1980 (age 45) Yokohama, Japan
- Turned pro: 1998
- Prize money: $70,312

Singles
- Career record: 0–1
- Career titles: 0
- Highest ranking: No. 367 (28 July 2003)

Doubles
- Career record: 4–5
- Career titles: 0
- Highest ranking: No. 121 (3 May 2004)

Grand Slam doubles results
- French Open: 1R (2004)

Jun Kato (加藤 純, Katō Jun; born 25 October 1980) is a former professional tennis player from Japan.

== Biography ==
Kato was based in Switzerland from an early age. During his junior career he was friends with Roger Federer and partnered with him in several doubles tournaments. He beat Federer in a national under-12s final.

Turning professional in 1998, Kato made his first appearance in an ATP Tour tournament that year, the doubles at the Swiss Open Gstaad with Marco Chiudinelli. He was twice given a wildcard entry into the men's doubles draw at the Japan Open, the first in 2002, when he partnered with Gouichi Motomura to reach the quarter-finals. On the other occasion, in 2003, he and Satoshi Iwabuchi upset the top seeded pairing of Wayne Arthurs and Paul Hanley in the first round, en route to the semi-finals.

In 2003 he won two Challenger doubles titles, on hard courts in Togliatti and Valladolid.

Kato represented the Japan Davis Cup team in 2003, for a tie against India in New Delhi. He played the doubles rubber with Thomas Shimada, which they lost to Mahesh Bhupathi and Leander Paes. In the reverse singles he was beaten by Rohan Bopanna.

He featured in the main draw of the men's doubles at the 2004 French Open, with Stephen Huss, for a first round exit, to Russians Igor Andreev and Nikolay Davydenko.

== Challenger titles ==
=== Doubles: (2) ===
No.	Year	Tournament	Surface	Partner	Opponents	Score
1.	2003	Togliatti, Russia	Hard	(Austria) Alexander Peya	(France) Rodolphe Cadart (France) Benjamin Cassaigne	7–6^{(9–7)}, 6–4
2.	2003	Valladolid, Spain	Hard	(Poland) Łukasz Kubot	(Russia) Philipp Mukhometov (United States) Tripp Phillips	4–6, 6–0, 6–1

== See also ==
- List of Japan Davis Cup team representatives
