= Kenichi Kiyomiya =

Japanese tennis player (born 1967)

- Native name: 清宮健一
- Country (sports): Japan
- Born: 1 November 1967 (age 57)
- Prize money: $6,318

Singles
- Career record: 0–1 (ATP Tour)
- Highest ranking: No. 599 (2 May 1988)

Doubles
- Career record: 0–1 (ATP Tour)
- Highest ranking: No. 551 (17 September 1990)

Kenichi Kiyomiya (born 1 November 1967) is a Japanese former professional tennis player.

Kiyomiya was trained in the United States, where he arrived at a young age in the late 1970s.

In 1988 he represented Japan in a Davis Cup tie against Thailand in Bangkok. Japan won the tie, a relegation play-off, but Kiyomiya lost his doubles rubber, partnering Shigeru Ota.

Following his retirement from the tour he transitioned into coaching.

== See also ==
- List of Japan Davis Cup team representatives
