= Haruo Nakano =

Japanese tennis player (born 1965)

- Country (sports): Japan
- Born: 20 February 1965 (age 60)
- Plays: Right-handed
- Prize money: $13,515

Singles
- Career record: 0–2 (ATP Tour)
- Highest ranking: No. 585 (24 December 1990)

Doubles
- Career record: 0–7 (ATP Tour)
- Highest ranking: No. 494 (26 November 1984)

Haruo Nakano (Japanese: 中野 陽夫; born 20 February 1965) is a Japanese former professional tennis player.

Nagano appeared in a single Davis Cup tie for Japan, against South Korea at home in Hasaki, Ibaraki in 1989. He was victorious in the doubles, partnering Shigeru Ota, but lost both of his singles matches, which included the tie deciding fifth rubber to Song Dong-wook.

Since his retirement he served for period of time as coach of Kimiko Date.

In 2019, Nagano has arrested on the suspicion of using amphetamine.

== See also ==
- List of Japan Davis Cup team representatives
