= Ariake Tennis Park =

Park in Tokyo, japan

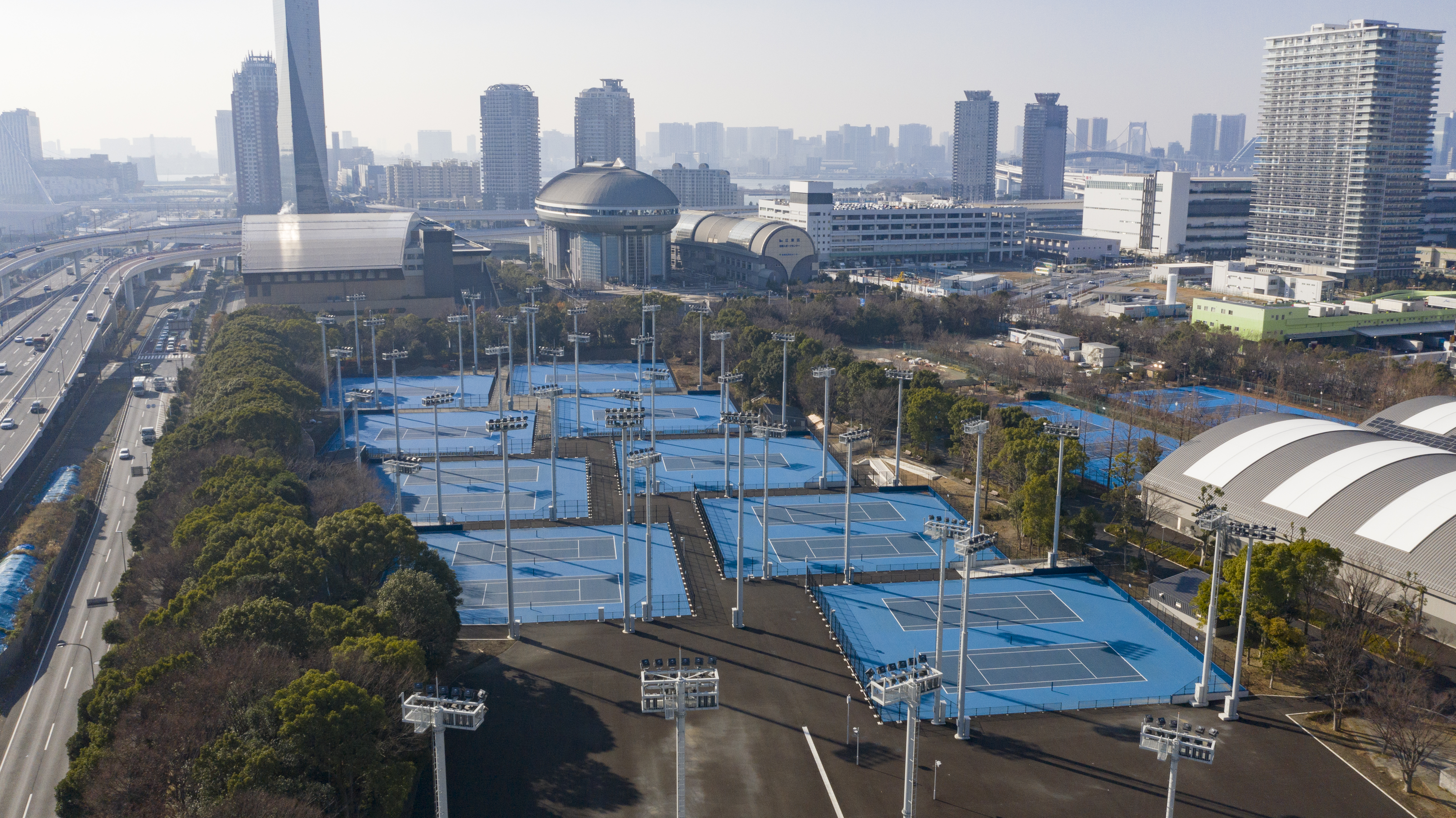
- Aerial view of Ariake Tennis Park
- Interactive map of Ariake Tennis Park
- Location: Kōtō, Tokyo, Japan
- Coordinates: 35°38′6.9″N 139°47′17.6″E
- Public transit: Rinkai (Kokusai-Tenjijō: R-03); Yurikamome (Ariake-Tennis-no-mori: U-13); Tokyo BRT (Ariake-Tennis-no-mori: B-04)

Construction
- Opened: 1983

Ariake Tennis Park (有明テニスの森公園, Ariake Tenisu no Mori Kōen) is a park in the Ariake district of Kōtō, Tokyo that was used for the 2020 Summer Olympics. The park has many tennis courts, a lawn plaza, a jogging course, a walking path, and the Ariake Coliseum.

== Location ==
The park is located on the artificial island of Ariake in the Kōtō ward of Tokyo, Japan. It can be accessed via Kokusai-tenjijo Station on the Rinkai Line.

== Overview ==
The park features facilities such as tennis courts, a lawn area, jogging courses, and walking paths. It is open year-round with no admission fee required.

The park houses a total of 49 tennis courts, including 33 hard courts and 16 artificial grass courts with sand infill, making it one of the largest facilities of its kind in Japan.

- Ariake Coliseum (Center Court)
  - One hard court

- Seating capacity: 10,008 (9,856 fixed seats, 36 wheelchair seats, 36 companion seats, and 80 additional amenity seats)

- Show Court
  - One hard court

- Seating capacity: 3,018 (2,910 fixed seats, 36 wheelchair seats, 36 companion seats, and 36 additional amenity seats)

- Indoor Courts
  - Eight hard courts
- Outdoor Hard Courts
  - 23 hard courts
- Outdoor Artificial Grass Courts
  - 16 courts

The indoor courts are adjacent to a clubhouse, which includes changing rooms, showers, lockers, a hall, and a restaurant. Access to the courts requires a reservation and a usage fee. Parking facilities, restrooms, and vending machines are available on-site. The park can be accessed via the "Coliseum Bridge" from the west side of the Kokusai-Tenjijo Station on the Rinkai Line.

== History ==
The park opened in May 1983 with 32 outdoor hard courts. In August of the same year, 16 additional outdoor clay courts were added. The Ariake Coliseum was inaugurated in April 1987 as an open-air venue with one hard court. In April 1991, a retractable sliding roof was installed. The clay courts were later converted into artificial grass courts with sand infill.

In preparation for the 2020 Summer Olympics and 2020 Summer Paralympics, the park underwent major renovations. These included upgrades to the Ariake Coliseum, the construction of the new Show Court in 2019, and the reconstruction of the clubhouse with new indoor courts by 2020. Outdoor courts were temporarily converted to 31 hard courts for the tournaments and later restored to their original specifications. The park facilities were closed on January 6, 2020, for the Olympic and Paralympic events. Following the games, the Ariake Coliseum, Show Court, and indoor courts reopened to the public. Outdoor courts underwent further renovations and were reopened in April and May 2023.

== Tournaments ==
The park hosts Japan's premier international tournaments: the Japan Open Tennis Championships (an ATP 500 event) and the Toray Pan Pacific Open (a WTA 500 event). It also serves as the exclusive venue for the All Japan Tennis Championships since 1984, a national tournament previously alternating between eastern and western Japan. In 2023, the park hosted the All Japan Soft Tennis Championships.

== Gallery ==
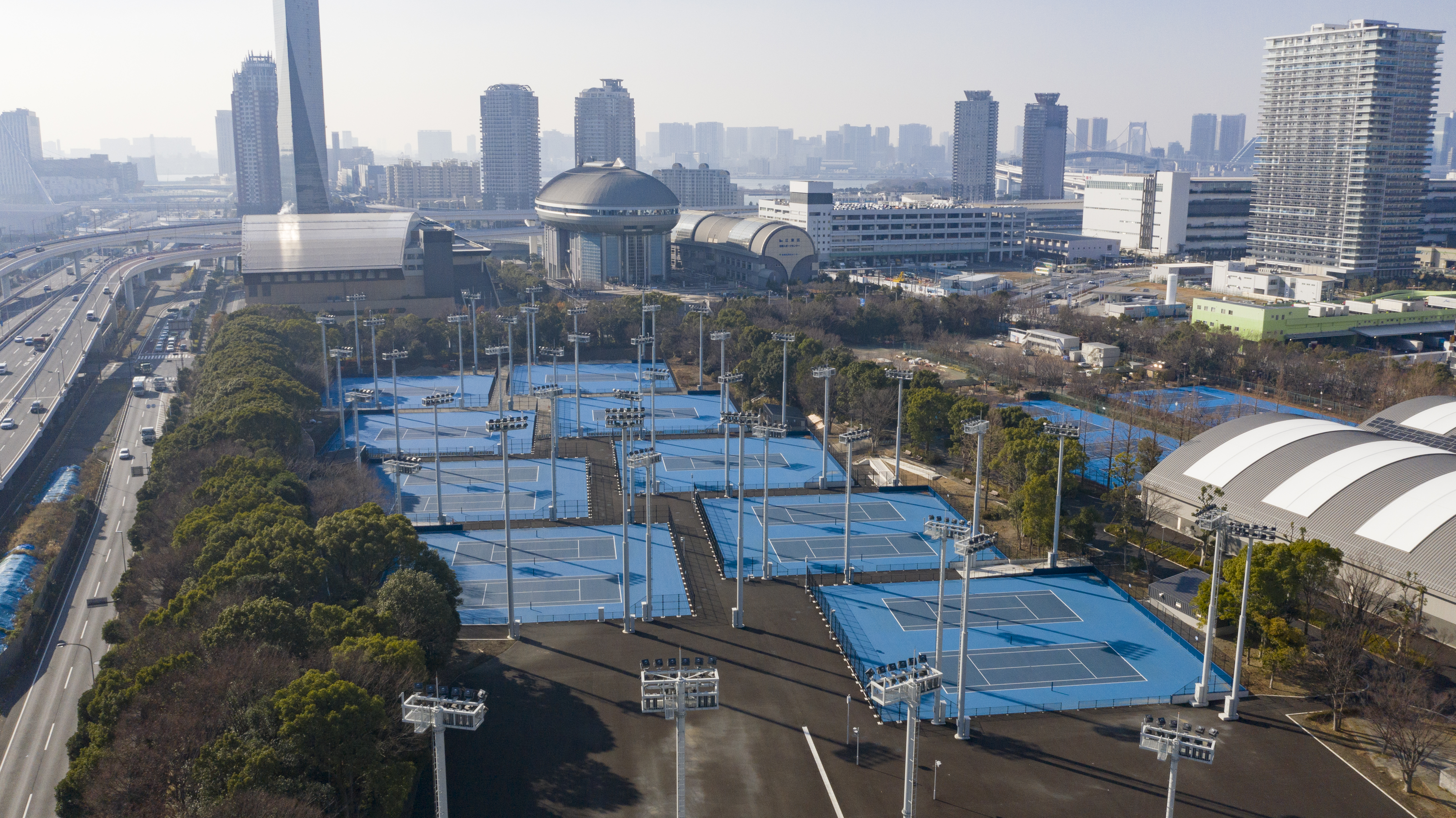
Tennis courts

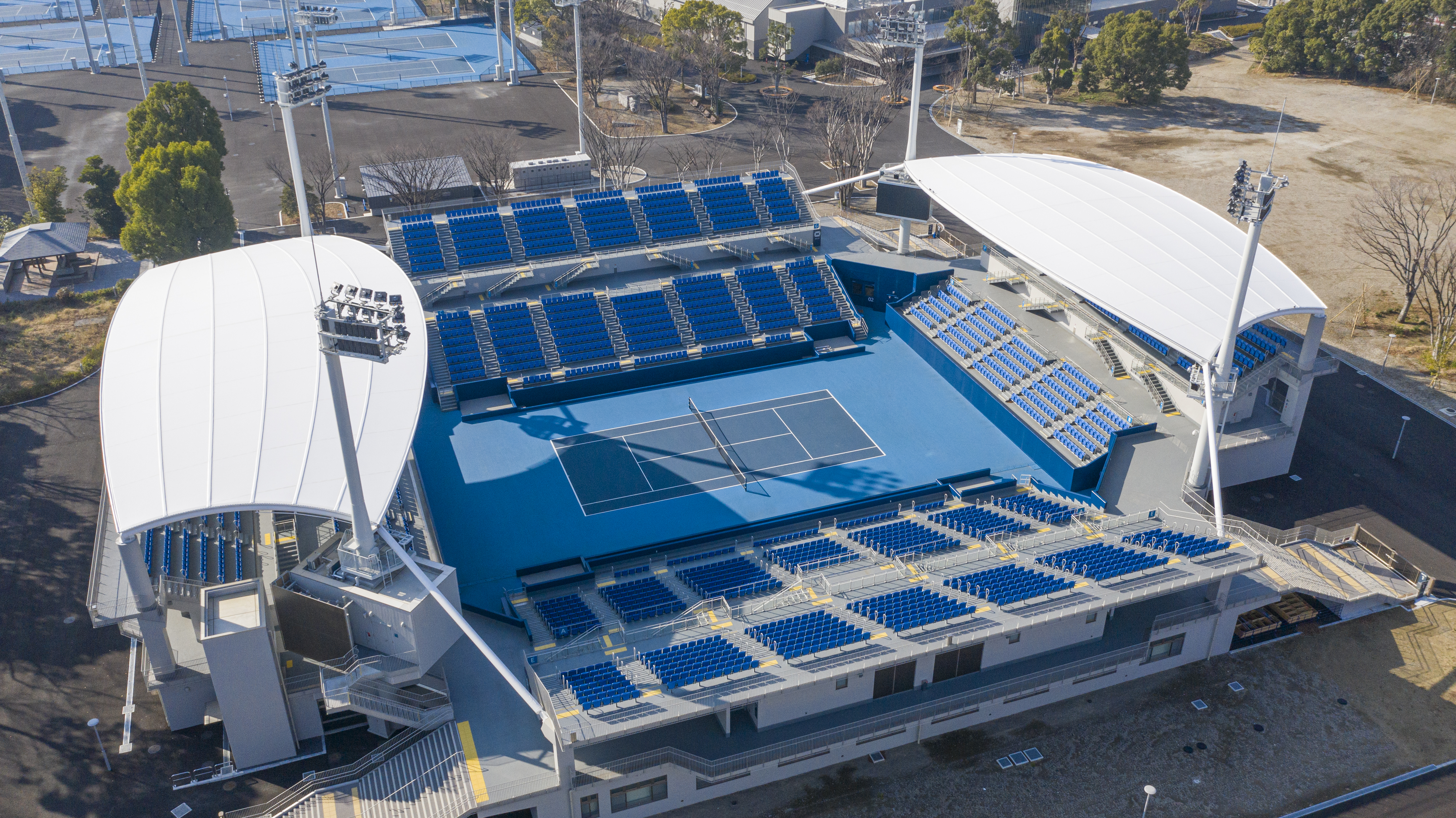
Show Court

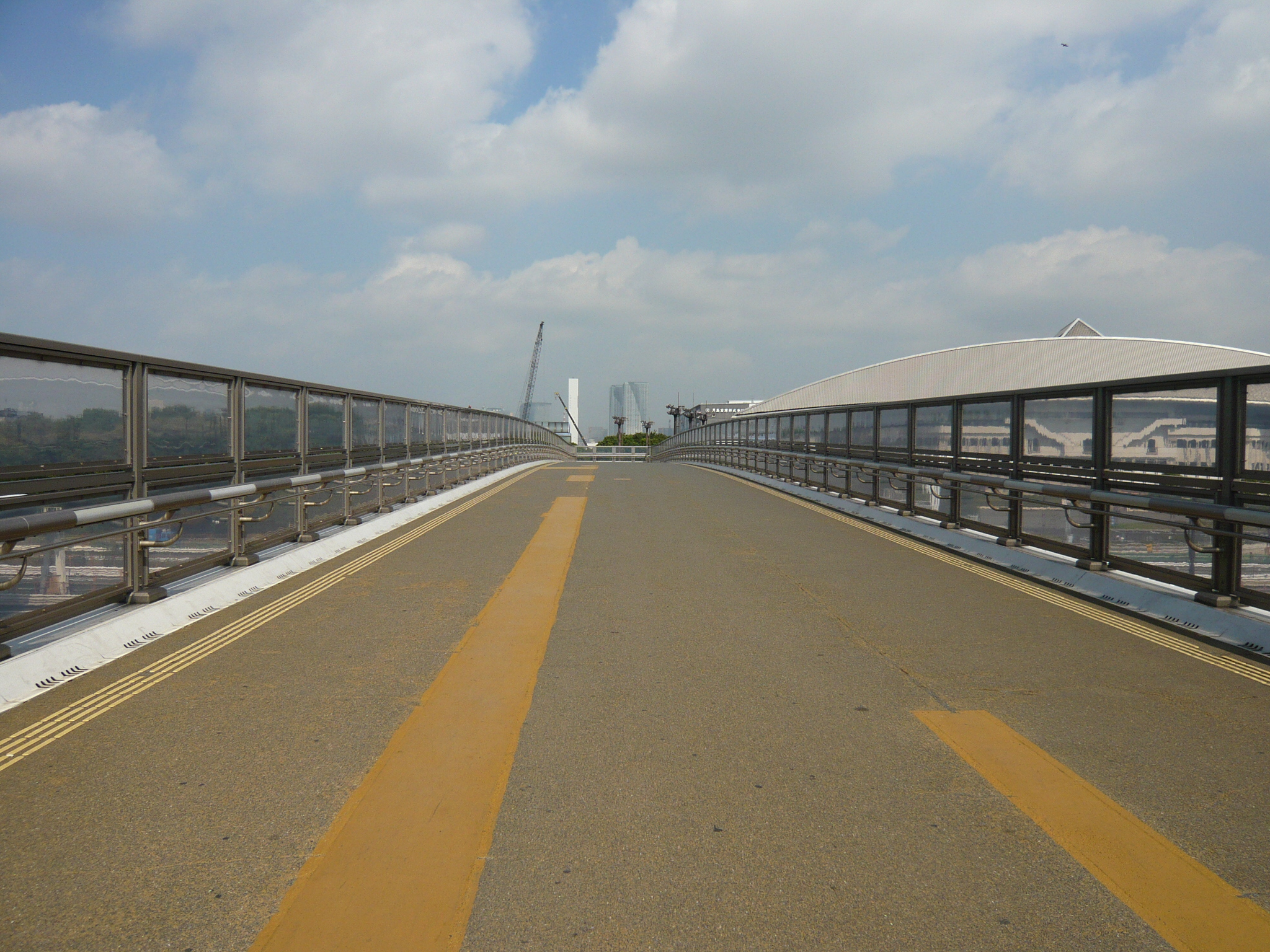
Coliseum Bridge

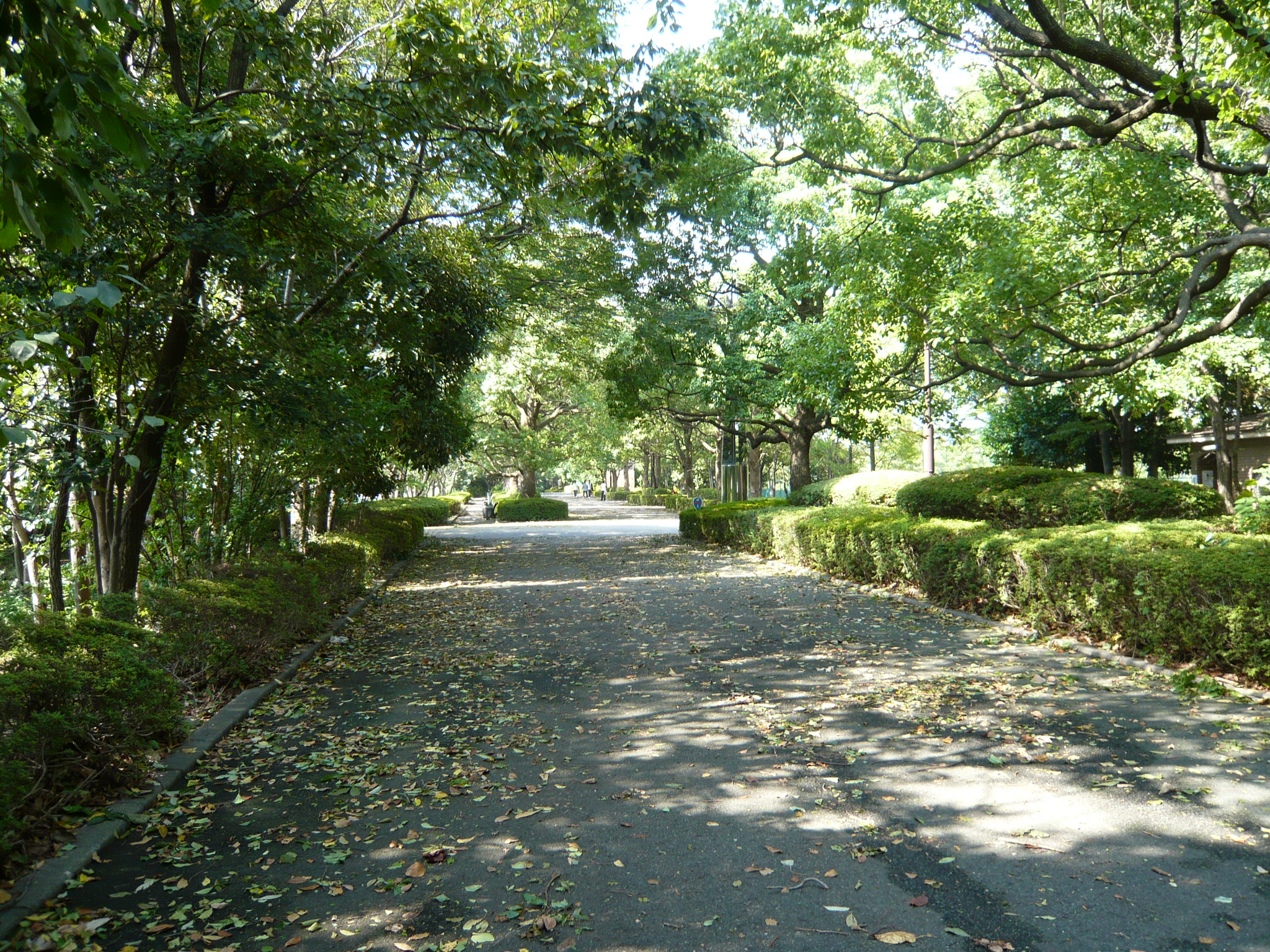

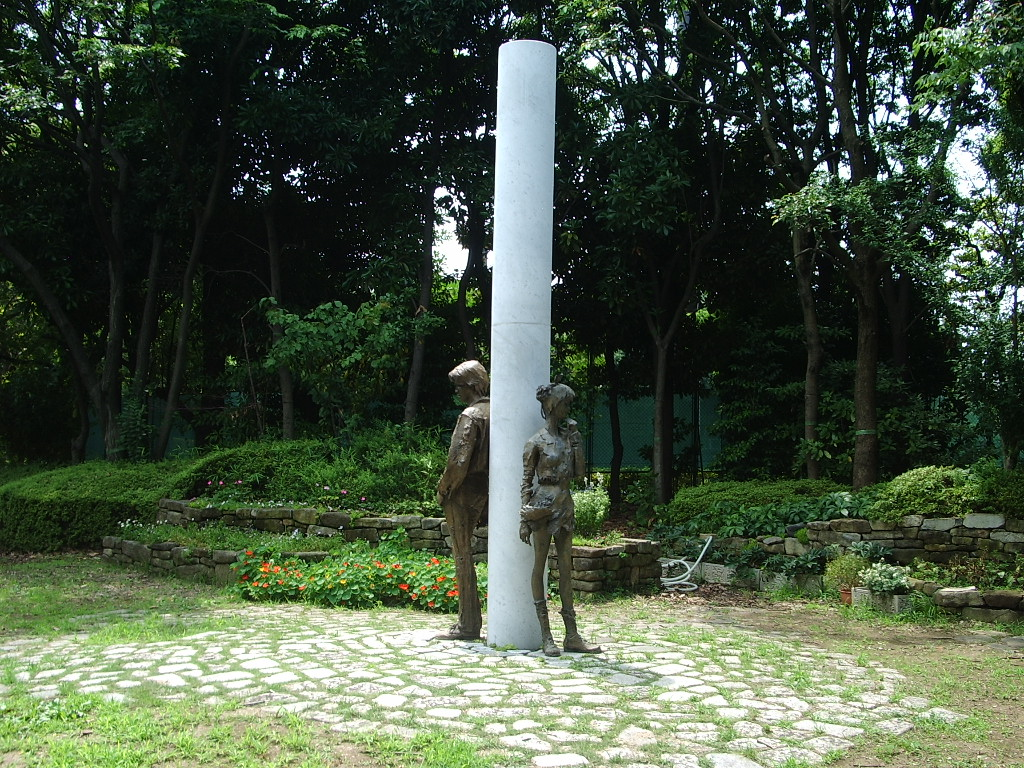

== Nearby facilities ==
- Major venues for the 2020 Summer Olympics and 2020 Summer Paralympics:
- Ariake Arena
- Ariake Gymnastics Centre
- Ariake Urban Sports Park
- Tokyo Aquatics Centre
- Tokyo Tatsumi International Swimming Center (closed in 2023; under renovation to reopen as the Tokyo Tatsumi Ice Arena in 2025)
- Tokyo Big Sight
- Ariake Garden
- Tokyo Garden Theater
- Ariake Shiki Theatre
- Hotel Villa Fontaine Grand Tokyo Ariake
- Small Worlds Tokyo
- Symbol Promenade Park
- Tokyo Waterfront City
