= Keishiro Yanagi =

Japanese tennis player (born 1941)

- Country (sports): Japan
- Born: 24 February 1941 (age 84); Kurume, Fukuoka, Japan

Singles
- Career record: 2–11

Grand Slam singles results
- French Open: 2R (1967)
- Wimbledon: 2R (1967)

Keishiro Yanagi (born 24 February 1941) is a Japanese former professional tennis player.

Born in Kurume, Yanagi played in six Davis Cup ties for Japan and had a 8/3 record, all in singles rubbers. He represented Japan at the 1966 Asian Games in Bangkok and won a gold medal in the team competition. In 1967 he reached the second round of both the French and Wimbledon Championships.

Yanagi featured in Japan historic Davis Cup win over Australia in Tokyo in 1971, which was secured with Toshiro Sakai's win in the fifth rubber. This was the first time Japan had beaten Australia in the Davis Cup for 50 years. Yanagi gave Japan a winning start when he defeated John Cooper in the opening rubber, which went the distance to five sets. In the first reverse singles he came close to securing the tie for Japan himself when he came from two sets and 3–5 down against Colin Dibley to send it into a fifth set, but eventually lost 6–8.

== See also ==
- List of Japan Davis Cup team representatives
