= Junzo Kawamori =

Japanese tennis player (1941–2017)

- Native name: 河盛純造
- Country (sports): Japan
- Born: 24 November 1941; Ashiya, Hyōgo, Japan
- Died: 12 August 2017 (aged 75)
- Plays: Right-handed

Singles

Grand Slam singles results
- French Open: Q2 (1969)
- Wimbledon: Q1 (1969, 1971)

Doubles

Grand Slam doubles results
- Australian Open: 1R (1969)
- French Open: 1R (1969, 1971)
- Wimbledon: 2R (1969)

Grand Slam mixed doubles results
- French Open: 1R (1969)

Junzo Kawamori (24 November 1941 – 12 August 2017) was a Japanese professional tennis player.

Born in the city of Ashiya in Hyōgo Prefecture, Kawamori attended junior high school together with future Davis Cup teammate Koji Watanabe and completed his studies at Konan University.

Kawamori, a two-time doubles winner at the All Japan Championships, represented Japan as a doubles specialist in four Davis Cup ties. One of his Davis Cup appearances was in Japan's 1971 win over Australia, which was the country's first triumph over their Eastern Zone rival for 50-years.

== See also ==
- List of Japan Davis Cup team representatives
