= Hyotaro Sato =

Japanese tennis player (1904–2006)

- Native name: 佐藤俵太郎
- Country (sports): Japan
- Born: 1 June 1904; Yokkaichi, Mie Prefecture, Japan
- Died: 12 April 2006 (aged 101)

Singles

Grand Slam singles results
- French Open: 4R (1931)
- Wimbledon: 2R (1931)

Hyotaro Sato (1 June 1904 – 12 April 2006) was a Japanese tennis player.

Born in Yokkaichi, Sato studied at Kwansei Gakuin University.

In 1930 and 1931 he toured with the Japan Davis Cup team, giving him the opportunity to feature in overseas tournaments. This included two appearances at the Wimbledon Championships. He won the Swiss and Düsseldorf international championships in 1930, beating Harry Hopman in the final of the latter. In 1931 he reached the fourth round of the French Championships, which included wins over René de Buzelet and Béla von Kehrling, before losing in five sets to the third seeded Christian Boussus. He was victorious in six of his eight Davis Cup singles rubbers.

Sato became the first Japanese player to join the professional ranks in 1937.

== See also ==
- List of Japan Davis Cup team representatives
