= Ichizo Konishi =

Japanese tennis player (born 1939)

- Native name: 小西一三
- Country (sports): Japan
- Born: 15 March 1939 Osaka, Japan
- Died: 20 August 2025 (aged 86)
- Plays: Left-handed

Singles

Grand Slam singles results
- Australian Open: 1R (1965)
- French Open: 3R (1965)
- Wimbledon: 2R (1966)
Medal record
Representing Japan
Tennis
Asian Games
Gold medal – first place	1966 Bangkok	Men's team
Silver medal – second place	1966 Bangkok	Men's singles

Ichizo Konishi (小西一三, Konishi Ichizō; 15 March 1939 – 20 August 2025) was a tennis player from Japan.

A left-handed player, Konishi was born in Osaka and grew up in Mie Prefecture. He attended Tokyo's Rikkyo University and in 1961 became their first student athlete to win the intercollegiate championships.

Konishi, who reached the singles third round of the 1965 French Championships, debuted for the Japan Davis Cup team in 1965 and featured in 12 singles rubbers across four campaigns during his career.

In 1966 he was All Japan champion for the only time (over Koji Watanabe in the final) and finished runner-up to Davis Cup teammate Osamu Ishiguro at the Asian Games in Bangkok.

He died on 20 August 2025 at the age of 86.

== See also ==
- List of Japan Davis Cup team representatives
