= Tetsuya Chaen =

Japanese tennis player (born 1973)

- Native name: 茶圓鉄也
- Country (sports): Japan
- Born: 5 November 1973 (age 51); Osaka Prefecture, Japan
- Height: 175 cm (5 ft 9 in)
- Plays: Right-handed (one-handed backhand)
- Prize money: $59,037

Singles
- Career record: 0–3
- Highest ranking: No. 339 (20 Apr 1998)

Grand Slam singles results
- Australian Open: Q1 (1994, 1997, 1998)

Doubles
- Career record: 1–2
- Highest ranking: No. 371 (5 Jul 1999)

Tetsuya Chaen (born 5 November 1973) is a Japanese former professional tennis player.

Born in Osaka, Chaen turned professional in 1993 and reached a best singles world ranking of 339 during his career, which included qualifying draw appearances at the Australian Open. He featured in the singles main draw of three ATP Tour tournaments, spanning 1994 to 2006. As a doubles player he had a highest ranking of 371 in the world.

== ITF Futures titles ==
=== Singles: (1) ===
No.	Date	Tournament	Surface	Opponent	Score
1.	Mar 1998	Japan F2, Shirako	Carpet	(Japan) Kentaro Masuda	7–6, 7–5
