= Hidehiko Tanizawa =

Japanese tennis player (born 1971)

- Native name: 谷澤英彦
- Country (sports): Japan
- Born: 5 December 1971 (age 53); Nagoya, Japan
- Plays: Left-handed
- Prize money: $21,269

Singles
- Career record: 0–4 (ATP Tour)
- Highest ranking: No. 597 (5 July 1993)

Grand Slam singles results
- Australian Open: Q1 (1993)

Doubles
- Career record: 0–3 (ATP Tour)
- Highest ranking: No. 577 (11 April 1994)

Hidehiko Tanizawa (born 5 December 1971) is a Japanese former professional tennis player.

Tanizawa, a left-handed player, won a national title as a 17-year old in 1989, when he defeated Tsuyoshi Fukui in the final of the All Japan Tennis Championships. In 1990 he featured in a Davis Cup tie against India in Chandigarh, to become Japan's youngest ever Davis Cup debutant. He lost his two singles rubbers, to Zeeshan Ali and Srinivasan Vasudevan. This was his only Davis Cup appearance and he continued competing in professional tournaments until 1996.

== See also ==
- List of Japan Davis Cup team representatives
