= Kentaro Masuda =

Japanese tennis player and coach

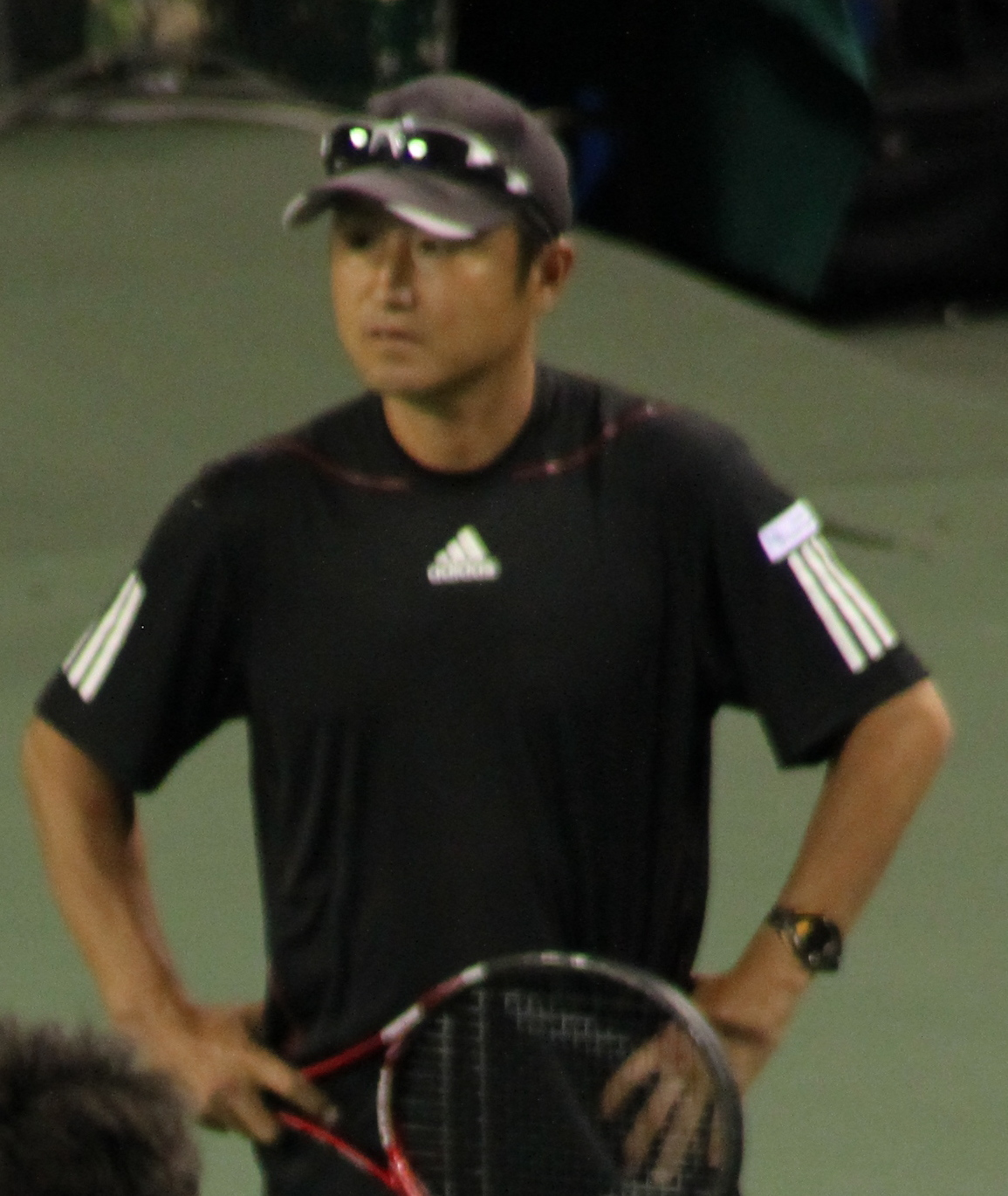
- Country (sports): Japan
- Born: 26 August 1971 (age 54) Yokohama, Japan
- Prize money: $62,434

Singles
- Career record: 0–6
- Highest ranking: No. 344 (25 May 1998)

Grand Slam singles results
- Australian Open: Q1 (1997)
- Wimbledon: Q2 (1998)

Doubles
- Highest ranking: No. 260 (22 September 2003)

Kentaro Masuda (増田 健太郎, Masuda Kentaro; born 26 August 1971) is a Japanese tennis coach and former professional player.

== Biography ==
Born in Yokohama, Masuda was twice thee national singles champion at the All Japan Tennis Championships, winning back to back titles in 1993 and 1994.

Masuda made all of his ATP Tour main draw appearances in Japan, appearing at the Japan Open on five occasions and once at the Tokyo Indoor. He played in the qualifiers at the 1997 Australian Open and 1998 Wimbledon Championships.

Following his retirement he has coached several Japanese players including Yasutaka Uchiyama and Akiko Omae. He has also been a coach for the Japan Davis Cup team.
