= Yaoki Ishii =

Japanese tennis player (born 1977)

- Country (sports): Japan
- Born: 29 April 1977 (age 48) Kamagaya, Chiba, Japan
- Height: 170 cm (5 ft 7 in)
- Plays: Right-handed (two-handed backhand)
- Prize money: $142,174

Singles
- Career record: 0–4 (ATP Tour)
- Highest ranking: No. 207 (28 February 2000)

Grand Slam singles results
- Australian Open: Q3 (2000)
- French Open: Q1 (2000)
- Wimbledon: Q2 (1998, 1999)
- US Open: Q1 (1998, 2000, 2001)

Doubles
- Career record: 0–4 (ATP Tour)
- Highest ranking: No. 241 (18 September 2000)

Yaoki Ishii (Japanese: 石井 弥起; born 29 April 1977) is a Japanese former professional tennis player.

A right-handed player from Kamagaya, Ishii won the singles title at the 1998 All Japan Tennis Championships and won a further two national championships in doubles.

Ishii reached a career high ranking of 207 in the world while competing on the professional tour and featured in the qualifying draws of all four grand slam tournaments.

In 2000 and 2001 he was a member of the Japan Davis Cup team, winning three of his five singles rubbers.

== See also ==
- List of Japan Davis Cup team representatives
