= Jiro Kumamaru =

Japanese tennis player (1921–2007)

- Full name: Jiro Kumamaru
- Native name: 隈丸次郎
- Country (sports): Japan
- Born: September 26, 1921; Kurume, Japan
- Died: June 8, 2007 (Age 85)
- Retired: 1954

Singles
- Career titles: 4

Grand Slam singles results
- US Open: 1R (1951)

Jiro Kumamaru (September 26, 1921 – June 8, 2007) was a Japanese tennis player in the years after World War 2.

== Career ==
Kumamaru was a four time winner of the Japan championships in 1949, 1950, 1951 and 1952. He played in United States in 1951. At the US clay court championships, Kumamaru beat seasoned player Seymour Greenberg after a two-hour battle. He lost in the quarter finals to Herbert Flam in five sets. He had led 4-1 in the fifth set. "Both men displayed extreme caution and rushed the net infrequently."
