= Tetsuya Sato =

Japanese tennis player (born 1969)

- Native name: 佐藤哲哉
- Country (sports): Japan
- Born: 26 March 1969 (age 57) Kanagawa, Japan
- Plays: Right-handed
- Prize money: $10,890

Singles
- Highest ranking: No. 515 (9 August 1993)

Doubles
- Career record: 0–6 (ATP Tour)
- Highest ranking: No. 510 (10 July 1995)
Medal record
Representing Japan
Summer Universiade
| Silver medal – second place | 1991 Sheffield | Mixed doubles |

Tetsuya Sato (born 26 March 1969) is a Japanese former professional tennis player.

== Early life and career ==
Born in Kanagawa, Sato played on the professional tour in the 1990s and represented Japan in a total of three Davis Cup ties during his career.

At home, he was a five-time national champion as a doubles player, winning his first All Japan Tennis Championships title in mixed doubles in 1990. From 1991 to 1995, he featured in five successive men's doubles finals, winning four.

Sato studied at Nihon University and won a silver medal for Japan at the 1991 Summer Universiade in Sheffield.

== See also ==
- List of Japan Davis Cup team representatives
