= Gouichi Motomura =

Japanese tennis player (born 1973)

- Native name: 本村 剛一
- Country (sports): Japan
- Residence: Tokyo, Japan
- Born: 25 December 1973 (age 51) Chiba, Japan
- Height: 173 cm (5 ft 8 in)
- Turned pro: 1992
- Retired: 2009
- Plays: Right-handed (two-handed backhand)
- Prize money: US$ 477,077

Singles
- Career record: 29–45
- Career titles: 0
- Highest ranking: No. 134 (6 March 2000)

Grand Slam singles results
- Australian Open: 1R (2000, 2003)
- French Open: Q1 (1998, 1999, 2000, 2005)
- Wimbledon: Q3 (2003)
- US Open: Q3 (1996)

Doubles
- Career record: 8–19
- Career titles: 0
- Highest ranking: No. 159 (19 October 1998)

Grand Slam doubles results
- Wimbledon: 1R (1999)
- US Open: Q2 (1998)

Team competitions
- Davis Cup: PO (1998, 2004)

Gouichi Motomura (本村 剛一, Motomura Gōichi) (born 25 December 1973) is a retired Challenger tour and Japan Davis Cup team tennis player. Over a 16-year period, Motomura captured four Challenger titles, all in doubles, and is tied for the most Davis Cup ties played by a Japanese player, with 23. His career high singles ranking is World No. 134 and doubles ranking is World No. 159.

== Career overview ==
Motomura played both singles and doubles throughout his tour career. His best singles results were reaching 10 Challenger finals – Bangkok, March 1998 (l./ Leander Paes); Kyoto, March 1999 (l./ Julian Knowle); Córdoba, July 1999 (l./ Oleg Ogorodov); Madrid, August, 1999 (l./ Ota Fukárek); Hong Kong, October 1999 (l./ Stéphane Huet); Hamilton, New Zealand, March 2000 (l./ Michael Joyce); Seoul, October 2001 (l./ Hyung-Taik Lee); Yokohama, October, 2001 (l./ Takao Suzuki); Campos do Jordao, July, 2003 (l./ Giovanni Lapentti); and Burnie, February, 2005 (l./ Chris Guccione). He won nine Futures tournaments. He appeared in the singles main draw of Grand Slam event twice, both times as a wild card entrant at the Australian Open, in 2000 and 2003, and both times he lost to a world top-50 French opponent. In 2000, he lost to World No. 26 Sébastien Grosjean 3–6, 3–6, 2–6, while three years later he fell to World No. 37 Nicolas Escudé 1–6, 6–2, 3–6, 2–6. Two other times, in 2007 and 2008, he attempted to qualify for the tournament but failed, while in 2007 he lost in the first round of qualifying for the Wimbledon Championships.

In ATP Tour events, Motomura's career match win-lose record in singles was 9 and 25, and he never advanced beyond the second round of a tournament. In doubles, he played in one Grand Slam, the 1999 Wimbledon Championships partnering Adriano Ferreira. The pair lost their first round match in four sets. In addition to his four Challenger doubles titles, Motomura reached five other finals and captured two Futures titles. He did not play with a regular partner but two of his Challenger wins came when playing with Oleg Ogorodov. Late in his career he and partner Satoshi Iwabuchi compiled a 14 and 2 win–loss record in four Futures events.

== Individual match results ==
Motomura's biggest match wins were over Tim Henman in 1994; a young Tommy Haas in 1996; Paradorn Srichaphan three times, in 1999, 2001 and 2002; World No. 72 David Prinosil in 1999; World No. 22 (and former World No. 1) Marcelo Ríos in 2000; Mario Ančić twice in 2001; Yen-Hsun Lu four times, in 2001, twice in 2003, and in 2007; World No. 40 Jarkko Nieminen in 2002; World No. 44 Karol Beck in 2003; and Dudi Sela in 2005. His career tour win-lose record against top-100 players was 6 and 24. The highest ranked opponent he faced was World No. 3 Lleyton Hewitt, at the 2004 Japan Open, and Motomura managed to take the second set in a 0–6, 6–3, 1–6 loss. In terms of head-to-head results, in all ITF, ATP, and Davis Cup matches (qualifying and main draw^{1}), he went 3 and 4 lifetime against Srichaphan; 2–9 versus Hyung-Taik Lee; 4–2 versus Lu; 4–2 versus Ti Chen; 3–3 versus Yong-Il Yoon; 1–3 versus Ogorodov; 7–7 versus Davis Cup teammate Iwabuchi; and 1–3 versus Takao Suzuki.

^{1}With the exception of qualifying matches for Futures events.

== All-Japan Championships ==
Motomura won four out of five All-Japan singles championships between 1999 and 2003 (1999, 2000, 2002 and 2003). He was also runner-up in 1996. He won the doubles title three times; in 1993 and 1995 partnering Tetsuya Sato; and in 1996 with Thomas Shimada.
