= Mitsuru Takada =

Japanese tennis player (born 1969)

- Country (sports): Japan
- Residence: Kawasaki, Japan
- Born: 26 September 1969 (age 56) Okinawa Prefecture, Japan
- Height: 1.78 m (5 ft 10 in)
- Plays: Right-handed (one-handed backhand)
- Prize money: $27,246

Singles
- Career record: 0–0 (at ATP Tour level, Grand Slam level, and in Davis Cup)
- Career titles: 0
- Highest ranking: No. 706 (7 June 1999)

Doubles
- Career record: 3–7 (at ATP Tour level, Grand Slam level, and in Davis Cup)
- Career titles: 1 Challenger, 6 ITF
- Highest ranking: No. 245 (27 July 1998)
- Last updated on: 25 June 2018.

Mitsuru Takada (高田充, Takada Mitsuru) born 26 September 1969 is a former Japanese tennis player.

Takada has a career high ATP singles ranking of 706 achieved on 7 June 1999. He also has a career high ATP doubles ranking of 245 achieved on 27 July 1998.

Takada made his ATP main draw debut at the 1994 Tokyo Indoor in the doubles main draw.

He later became the coach of Japanese tennis player Yoshihito Nishioka.
