= Hideki Kaneko =

Japanese tennis player (born 1974)

- Full name: Hideki Kaneko
- Country (sports): Japan
- Born: 6 March 1974 (age 51) Tokyo, Japan
- Plays: Left-handed (two-handed both sides)
- Prize money: $98,787

Singles
- Career record: 6–13
- Career titles: 0
- Highest ranking: No. 200 (15 January 1996)

Doubles
- Career record: 0–1
- Highest ranking: No. 452 (5 August 1996)

Hideki Kaneko (born 6 March 1974) is a former professional tennis player from Japan.

== Biography ==
Kaneko, a left-handed player from Tokyo, began playing tennis at the age of eight.

Most of his ATP Tour main draw appearances were as a wildcard at his home events, the Japan Open and Tokyo Indoor. The only exception was the 1996 Indonesia Open, which he entered as a qualifier. He made the second round of the Japan Open on three occasions.

His four Davis Cup ties for Japan included a five-set loss to Todd Woodbridge in 1996 and a decisive fifth rubber win over Uzbekistan in Tashkent in 1997.

He was a member of the silver medal-winning Japanese team at 1998 Asian Games in Bangkok.

== See also ==
- List of Japan Davis Cup team representatives
