= Shigeru Ota =

Japanese tennis player (born 1967)

- Country (sports): Japan
- Born: 8 January 1967 (age 58)
- Prize money: $13,083

Singles
- Career record: 0–2 (ATP Tour)
- Highest ranking: No. 509 (13 June 1988)

Doubles
- Career record: 0–4 (ATP Tour)
- Highest ranking: No. 384 (6 August 1990)

Shigeru Ota (Japanese: 太田 茂; born 8 January 1967) is a Japanese former professional tennis player.

Ota appeared in four Davis Cup ties for Japan between 1988 and 1990, winning one singles and one doubles rubber. In 1990 he played in one of the longest fifth sets in Davis Cup history, which he and Shuzo Matsuoka lost 16–18 to India's Zeeshan Ali and Leander Paes.

== See also ==
- List of Japan Davis Cup team representatives
