= 1993 Davis Cup Asia/Oceania Zone Group I =

International tennis competition

The Asia/Oceania Zone was one of the three zones of the regional Davis Cup competition in 1993.

In the Asia/Oceania Zone there were three different tiers, called groups, in which teams competed against each other to advance to the upper tier. Winners in Group I advanced to the World Group qualifying round, along with losing teams from the World Group first round. The winner of the preliminary round joined the remaining teams in the main draw first round, while the losing team was relegated to the Asia/Oceania Zone Group II in 1994.

== Participating nations ==
- Chinese Taipei
- Hong Kong
- Indonesia
- Japan
- New Zealand
- Philippines
- South Korea

=== Draw ===
Preliminary Round; 5–7 February
Manila, Philippines (indoor clay)
Philippines	4
Chinese Taipei	1

- Chinese Taipei relegated to Group II in 1994.

First Round; 26–29 March
South Korea
bye
Jakarta, Indonesia (clay)
Philippines	2
Indonesia	3
Causeway Bay, Hong Kong (hard)
Japan	5
Hong Kong	0
bye
New Zealand

Second Round; 30 April–2 May
Seoul, South Korea (clay)
South Korea	5
Indonesia	0
Saga, Japan (indoor carpet)
Japan	2
New Zealand	3

- South Korea and New Zealand advance to World Group qualifying round.

== Preliminary round ==
=== Philippines vs. Chinese Taipei ===
Philippines
4
Philippine Columbian Association, Manila, Philippines
5–7 February 1993
Clay (indoors)

Chinese Taipei
1

			1	2	3	4	5
1	(Philippines) (Chinese Taipei)	Felix Barrientos; Chen Chih-jung	7; 5	6; 3	6; 1
2	(Philippines) (Chinese Taipei)	Roland So; Lien Yu-hui	6; 2	5; 7	7^{9} 6^{7}	3; 6	6; 2
3	(Philippines) (Chinese Taipei)	Felix Barrientos / Roland So; Chen Chih-jung / Lien Yu-hui	6; 3	5; 7	7^{7} 6^{3}	6^{5} 7^{7}	6; 3
4	(Philippines) (Chinese Taipei)	Joseph Lizardo; Chang Shih-fong	6; 4	6; 2
5	(Philippines) (Chinese Taipei)	Robert Angelo; Chiang Jinn-yen	3; 6	5; 7

== First round ==
=== Indonesia vs. Philippines ===
Indonesia
3
Gelora Senayan Sports Complex, Jakarta, Indonesia
26–29 March 1993
Clay

Philippines
2

			1	2	3	4	5
1	(Indonesia) (Philippines)	Suwandi Suwandi; Felix Barrientos	3; 6	6; 3	1; 6	2; 6
2	(Indonesia) (Philippines)	Benny Wijaya; Joseph Lizardo	6; 0	6; 0	6; 2
3	(Indonesia) (Philippines)	Hary Suharyadi / Bonit Wiryawan; Robert Angelo / Felix Barrientos	7^{10} 6^{8}	6; 1	6^{5} 7^{7}	4; 6	6; 3
4	(Indonesia) (Philippines)	Benny Wijaya; Felix Barrientos	3; 6	6; 1	6; 4	5; 7	3; 6
5	(Indonesia) (Philippines)	Suwandi Suwandi; Joseph Lizardo	6^{4} 7^{7}	6; 2	7; 5	6; 2

=== Hong Kong vs. Japan ===
Hong Kong
0
Victoria Park, Causeway Bay, Hong Kong
26–28 March 1993
Hard

Japan
5

			1	2	3	4	5
1	(Hong Kong) (Japan)	Colin Grant; Shuzo Matsuoka	4; 6	2; 6	6^{0} 7^{7}
2	(Hong Kong) (Japan)	Mike Walker; Yasufumi Yamamoto	1; 6	3; 6	2; 6
3	(Hong Kong) (Japan)	Colin Grant / Mike Walker; Eduardo Furusho / Gouichi Motomura	4; 6	4; 6	6^{7} 7^{9}
4	(Hong Kong) (Japan)	Mike Walker; Shuzo Matsuoka	3; 6	7^{7} 6^{5}	3; 6
5	(Hong Kong) (Japan)	Colin Grant; Yasufumi Yamamoto	2; 6	1; 6

== Second round ==
=== South Korea vs. Indonesia ===
South Korea
5
Jang Choong Tennis Centre, Seoul, South Korea
30 April–2 May 1993
Clay

Indonesia
0

			1	2	3	4	5
1	(South Korea) (Indonesia)	Shin Han-cheol; Suwandi Suwandi	6; 3	7; 5	6; 4
2	(South Korea) (Indonesia)	Yoon Yong-il; Benny Wijaya	6; 4	6; 2	4; 6	7^{7} 6^{4}
3	(South Korea) (Indonesia)	Kim Chi-wan / Shin Han-cheol; Hary Suharyadi / Bonit Wiryawan	6; 4	6^{7} 7^{9}	6; 4	2; 6	6; 2
4	(South Korea) (Indonesia)	Shin Han-cheol; Benny Wijaya	4; 6	7^{7} 6^{2}	6; 3
5	(South Korea) (Indonesia)	Yoon Yong-il; Suwandi Suwandi	6; 4	6; 4

=== Japan vs. New Zealand ===
Japan
2
Saga Prefectural Gymnasium, Saga, Japan
30 April–2 May 1993
Carpet (indoors)

New Zealand
3

			1	2	3	4	5
1	(Japan) (New Zealand)	Yasufumi Yamamoto; Brett Steven	4; 6	2; 6	6^{4} 7^{7}
2	(Japan) (New Zealand)	Shuzo Matsuoka; Kelly Evernden	7; 5	6; 4	6; 4
3	(Japan) (New Zealand)	Eduardo Furusho / Shuzo Matsuoka; Kelly Evernden / Brett Steven	4; 6	3; 6	6^{3} 7^{7}
4	(Japan) (New Zealand)	Shuzo Matsuoka; Brett Steven	4; 6	1; 6	2; 6
5	(Japan) (New Zealand)	Yasufumi Yamamoto; Kelly Evernden	6^{5} 7^{7}	6; 4	1; 0			retired
