= 1994 Davis Cup Asia/Oceania Zone Group I =

International tennis competition

The Asia/Oceania Zone was one of the three zones of the regional Davis Cup competition in 1994.

In the Asia/Oceania Zone there were three different tiers, called groups, in which teams competed against each other to advance to the upper tier. Winners in Group I advanced to the World Group qualifying round, along with losing teams from the World Group first round. The winner of the preliminary round joined the remaining teams in the main draw first round, while the losing team was relegated to the Asia/Oceania Zone Group II in 1995.

== Participating nations ==
- China
- Hong Kong
- Indonesia
- Japan
- New Zealand
- Philippines
- South Korea

=== Draw ===
Preliminary Round; 4–6 February
Beijing, China (indoor carpet)
China	0
Japan	5

- China relegated to Group II in 1995.

First Round; 25–27 March
New Zealand
bye
Kyoto, Japan (indoor carpet)
Japan	5
Philippines	0
Causeway Bay, Hong Kong (hard)
Indonesia	3
Hong Kong	2
bye
South Korea

Second Round; 29 April–8 May
Christchurch, New Zealand (indoor carpet)
New Zealand	3
Japan	2
Jakarta, Indonesia (clay)
Indonesia	3
South Korea	2

- New Zealand and Indonesia advance to World Group qualifying round.

== Preliminary round ==
=== China vs. Japan ===
China
0
Olympic Sports Centre, Beijing, China
4–6 February 1994
Carpet (indoors)

Japan
5

			1	2	3	4	5
1	(China) (Japan)	Pan Bing; Shuzo Matsuoka	7^{7} 6^{3}	6; 4	3; 6	2; 6	5; 7
2	(China) (Japan)	Xia Jiaping; Yasufumi Yamamoto	3; 6	1; 6	2; 6
3	(China) (Japan)	Pan Bing / Xia Jiaping; Thomas Shimada / Ryuso Tsujino	2; 6	6^{5} 7^{7}	5; 7
4	(China) (Japan)	Xia Jiaping; Shuzo Matsuoka	4; 6	0; 6
5	(China) (Japan)	Pan Bing; Yasufumi Yamamoto	4; 6	5; 7

== First round ==
=== Japan vs. Philippines ===
Japan
5
Kyoto Municipal Stadium, Kyoto, Japan
25–27 March 1994
Carpet (indoors)

Philippines
0

			1	2	3	4	5
1	(Japan) (Philippines)	Shuzo Matsuoka; Robert Angelo	6; 3	6; 3	6; 3
2	(Japan) (Philippines)	Yasufumi Yamamoto; Joseph Lizardo	6; 2	6; 3	6; 3
3	(Japan) (Philippines)	Thomas Shimada / Ryuso Tsujino; Robert Angelo / Sofronio Palahang	3; 6	6; 0	6; 3	6; 3
4	(Japan) (Philippines)	Shuzo Matsuoka; Joseph Lizardo	6; 1	6; 3
5	(Japan) (Philippines)	Yasufumi Yamamoto; Robert Angelo	3; 6	6; 1	6; 2

=== Hong Kong vs. Indonesia ===
Hong Kong
2
Victoria Park, Causeway Bay, Hong Kong
25–27 March 1994
Hard

Indonesia
3

			1	2	3	4	5
1	(Hong Kong) (Indonesia)	Mike Walker; Benny Wijaya	3; 6	3; 6	2; 6
2	(Hong Kong) (Indonesia)	Colin Grant; Suwandi Suwandi	5; 7	3; 6	2; 6
3	(Hong Kong) (Indonesia)	Thorsten Poelzl / Mike Walker; Suwandi Suwandi / Bonit Wiryawan	5; 7	2; 6	5; 7
4	(Hong Kong) (Indonesia)	Melvin Tong; Benny Wijaya	6; 4	6; 2
5	(Hong Kong) (Indonesia)	Thorsten Poelzl; Suwandi Suwandi	6; 4	6; 1

== Second round ==
=== New Zealand vs. Japan ===
New Zealand
3
Pioneer Stadium, Christchurch, New Zealand
29 April–1 May 1994
Carpet (indoors)

Japan
2

			1	2	3	4	5
1	(New Zealand) (Japan)	Kelly Evernden; Shuzo Matsuoka	2; 6	2; 6	7^{7} 6^{2}	4; 6
2	(New Zealand) (Japan)	Brett Steven; Yasufumi Yamamoto	6; 3	6; 4	2; 6	7^{7} 6^{3}
3	(New Zealand) (Japan)	Kelly Evernden / Brett Steven; Thomas Shimada / Ryuso Tsujino	6; 3	3; 6	6; 2	6; 1
4	(New Zealand) (Japan)	Brett Steven; Shuzo Matsuoka	0; 6	4; 6	6; 3	6; 0	6; 4
5	(New Zealand) (Japan)	Kelly Evernden; Yasufumi Yamamoto	5; 6	6^{6} 7^{8}

=== Indonesia vs. South Korea ===
Indonesia
3
Gelora Senayan Sports Complex, Jakarta, Indonesia
6–8 May 1994
Clay

South Korea
2

			1	2	3	4	5
1	(Indonesia) (South Korea)	Suwandi Suwandi; Chang Eui-jong	4; 6	6; 4	6; 4	2; 6	6; 4
2	(Indonesia) (South Korea)	Benny Wijaya; Shin Han-cheol	6; 2	7; 5	6; 4
3	(Indonesia) (South Korea)	Benny Wijaya / Bonit Wiryawan; Chang Eui-jong / Kim Chi-wan	4; 6	6; 4	6^{7} 7^{9}	3; 6
4	(Indonesia) (South Korea)	Benny Wijaya; Chang Eui-jong	6; 4	3; 6	2; 6	4; 6
5	(Indonesia) (South Korea)	Suwandi Suwandi; Shin Han-cheol	6^{5} 7^{7}	7; 5	6; 3	7^{7} 6^{4}
