= 1992 Davis Cup Asia/Oceania Zone Group I =

International tennis competition

The Asia/Oceania Zone was one of the three zones of the regional Davis Cup competition in 1992.

In the Asia/Oceania Zone there were three different tiers, called groups, in which teams competed against each other to advance to the upper tier. Winners in Group I advanced to the World Group qualifying round, along with losing teams from the World Group first round. Winners of the preliminary rounds joined the remaining teams in the main draw first round, while losing teams competed in the relegation play-off, with the losing team relegated to the Asia/Oceania Zone Group II in 1993.

== Participating nations ==
- China
- Chinese Taipei
- India
- Indonesia
- Japan
- New Zealand
- Philippines
- South Korea

=== Draw ===
Relegation Play-off; 27–29 March
Tokyo, Japan (hard)
China | 2
Japan | 3

Preliminary Round; 31 January–2 February
Seoul, South Korea (indoor carpet)
South Korea | 5
China | 0
Manila, Philippines (hard)
Japan | 2
Philippines | 3

- China relegated to Group II in 1993.

First Round; 27–29 March
New Zealand
bye
Seoul, South Korea (clay)
Chinese Taipei | 0
South Korea | 5
Manila, Philippines (hard)
Philippines | 1
Indonesia | 4
bye
India

Second Round; 1–3 May
Seoul, South Korea (clay)
New Zealand | 2
South Korea | 3
Jakarta, Indonesia (clay)
Indonesia | 0
India | 5

- South Korea and India advance to World Group qualifying round.

== Preliminary round ==
=== South Korea vs. China ===
South Korea
5
Olympic Gymnasium, Seoul, South Korea
31 January–2 February 1992
Carpet (indoors)

China
0

| | | | 1 | 2 | 3 | 4 | 5 |
|---|---|---|---|---|---|---|---|
| 1 | (South Korea) (China) | Chang Eui-jong; Pan Bing | 7^{9} 6^{7} | 6; 3 | 7; 5 |
| 2 | (South Korea) (China) | Ji Seung-ho; Xia Jiaping | 6; 4 | 5; 7 | 4; 6 | 6; 2 | 7; 5 |
| 3 | (South Korea) (China) | Chang Eui-jong / Kim Chi-wan; Meng Qianghua / Xia Jiaping | 6; 2 | 6; 4 | 6; 2 |
| 4 | (South Korea) (China) | Kim Chi-wan; Zhang Jiuhua | 6; 3 | 6; 0 |
| 5 | (South Korea) (China) | Ji Seung-ho; Pan Bing | 6; 3 | 6; 2 |

=== Philippines vs. Japan ===
Philippines
3
Rizal Memorial Sports Complex, Manila, Philippines
31 January–2 February 1992
Hard

Japan
2

| | | | 1 | 2 | 3 | 4 | 5 |
|---|---|---|---|---|---|---|---|
| 1 | (Philippines) (Japan) | Roland So; Shuzo Matsuoka | 1; 6 | 4; 6 | 4; 6 |
| 2 | (Philippines) (Japan) | Felix Barrientos; Yasufumi Yamamoto | 3; 6 | 6; 1 | 7; 5 | 6; 4 |
| 3 | (Philippines) (Japan) | Felix Barrientos / Roland So; Tetsuya Sato / Ryuso Tsujino | 6; 4 | 7^{7} 6^{4} | 6; 1 |
| 4 | (Philippines) (Japan) | Felix Barrientos; Shuzo Matsuoka | 4; 6 | 6^{4} 7^{7} | 3; 6 |
| 5 | (Philippines) (Japan) | Roland So; Yasufumi Yamamoto | 6; 4 | 1; 6 | 2; 6 | 6; 3 | 6; 4 |

== First round ==
=== South Korea vs. Chinese Taipei ===
South Korea
5
Jang Choong Tennis Centre, Seoul, South Korea
27–29 March 1992
Clay

Chinese Taipei
0

| | | | 1 | 2 | 3 | 4 | 5 |
|---|---|---|---|---|---|---|---|
| 1 | (South Korea) (Chinese Taipei) | Kim Jae-sik; Lien Yu-hui | 6; 4 | 6; 2 | 6; 4 |
| 2 | (South Korea) (Chinese Taipei) | Chang Eui-jong; Chiang Jinn-yen | 6; 2 | 6; 2 | 6; 0 |
| 3 | (South Korea) (Chinese Taipei) | Chang Eui-jong / Ji Seung-ho; Chang Shih-fong / Lien Yu-hui | 6; 2 | 6; 2 | 6; 4 |
| 4 | (South Korea) (Chinese Taipei) | Chang Eui-jong; Lien Yu-hui | 6; 4 | 6; 4 |
| 5 | (South Korea) (Chinese Taipei) | Kim Jae-sik; Chiang Jinn-yen | 6; 4 | 6; 4 |

=== Philippines vs. Indonesia ===
Philippines
1
Rizal Memorial Sports Complex, Manila, Philippines
27–29 March 1992
Hard

Indonesia
4

| | | | 1 | 2 | 3 | 4 | 5 |
|---|---|---|---|---|---|---|---|---|
| 1 | (Philippines) (Indonesia) | Roland So; Dede Suhendar Dinata | 7; 5 | 3; 6 | 7; 5 | | | retired |
| 2 | (Philippines) (Indonesia) | Joseph Lizardo; Benny Wijaya | 4; 6 | 2; 6 | 1; 6 |
| 3 | (Philippines) (Indonesia) | Sofronio Palahang / Roland So; Hary Suharyadi / Bonit Wiryawan | 4; 6 | 4; 6 | 6^{1} 7^{7} |
| 4 | (Philippines) (Indonesia) | Roland So; Benny Wijaya | 4; 6 | 0; 3 | | | | retired |
| 5 | (Philippines) (Indonesia) | Joseph Lizardo; Hary Suharyadi | 6; 1 | 3; 6 | 4; 6 |

== Relegation play-offs ==
=== Japan vs. China ===
Japan
3
Ariake Coliseum, Tokyo, Japan
27–29 March 1992
Hard

China
2

| | | | 1 | 2 | 3 | 4 | 5 |
|---|---|---|---|---|---|---|---|
| 1 | (Japan) (China) | Shuzo Matsuoka; Pan Bing | 6; 2 | 6; 1 | 6; 3 |
| 2 | (Japan) (China) | Yasufumi Yamamoto; Xia Jiaping | 3; 6 | 6; 2 | 3; 6 | 4; 6 |
| 3 | (Japan) (China) | Shuzo Matsuoka / Tetsuya Sato; Pan Bing / Xia Jiaping | 2; 6 | 6^{7} 7^{9} | 4; 6 |
| 4 | (Japan) (China) | Shuzo Matsuoka; Xia Jiaping | 6; 1 | 6; 2 | 6; 1 |
| 5 | (Japan) (China) | Yasufumi Yamamoto; Pan Bing | 7^{7} 6^{1} | 6^{4} 7^{7} | 2; 6 | 7^{7} 6^{3} | 6; 2 |

== Second round ==
=== South Korea vs. New Zealand ===
South Korea
3
Dongdaemun Stadium, Seoul, South Korea
1–3 May 1992
Clay

New Zealand
2

| | | | 1 | 2 | 3 | 4 | 5 |
|---|---|---|---|---|---|---|---|
| 1 | (South Korea) (New Zealand) | Chang Eui-jong; Brett Steven | 6; 3 | 7; 5 | 5; 7 | 6^{5} 7^{7} | 13; 11 |
| 2 | (South Korea) (New Zealand) | Shin Han-cheol; Kelly Evernden | 2; 6 | 5; 7 | 4; 6 |
| 3 | (South Korea) (New Zealand) | Chang Eui-jong / Kim Chi-wan; Kelly Evernden / Brett Steven | 6; 2 | 7^{7} 6^{5} | 6; 3 |
| 4 | (South Korea) (New Zealand) | Chang Eui-jong; Kelly Evernden | 3; 6 | 6; 4 | 4; 6 | 6; 4 | 6; 3 |
| 5 | (South Korea) (New Zealand) | Kim Chi-wan; Brett Steven | 6^{6} 7^{8} | 3; 6 |

=== Indonesia vs. India ===
Indonesia
0
Gelora Senayan Sports Complex, Jakarta, Indonesia
1–3 May 1992
Clay

India
5

| | | | 1 | 2 | 3 | 4 | 5 |
|---|---|---|---|---|---|---|---|
| 1 | (Indonesia) (India) | Benny Wijaya; Leander Paes | 5; 7 | 2; 6 | 4; 6 |
| 2 | (Indonesia) (India) | Dede Suhendar Dinata; Ramesh Krishnan | 2; 6 | 0; 6 | 2; 6 |
| 3 | (Indonesia) (India) | Hary Suharyadi / Bonit Wiryawan; Ramesh Krishnan / Leander Paes | 5; 7 | 7; 5 | 4; 6 | 2; 6 |
| 4 | (Indonesia) (India) | Benny Wijaya; Ramesh Krishnan | 1; 6 | 6^{5} 7^{7} |
| 5 | (Indonesia) (India) | Hary Suharyadi; Leander Paes | 2; 6 | 3; 6 |
