= 1996 Davis Cup Asia/Oceania Zone Group I =

International tennis competition

The Asia/Oceania Zone was one of the three zones of the regional Davis Cup competition in 1996.

In the Asia/Oceania Zone there were three different tiers, called groups, in which teams competed against each other to advance to the upper tier. Winners in Group I advanced to the World Group qualifying round, along with losing teams from the World Group first round. Teams who lost their respective ties competed in the relegation play-offs, with winning teams remaining in Group I, whereas teams who lost their play-offs were relegated to the Asia/Oceania Zone Group II in 1997.

== Participating nations ==
- Australia
- China
- Chinese Taipei
- Indonesia
- Japan
- New Zealand
- Philippines
- South Korea

=== Draw ===
Second Round Play-offs
Taipei, Taiwan (hard)
Indonesia	3
Chinese Taipei	2

First Round Play-offs
Jakarta, Indonesia (clay)
China	5
Indonesia	0
Taichung, Taiwan (clay)
Philippines	3
Chinese Taipei	2

First Round
Christchurch, New Zealand (grass)
New Zealand	4
China	1
Jakarta, Indonesia (clay)
South Korea	4
Indonesia	1
Yokkaichi, Japan (indoor carpet)
Philippines	0
Japan	5
Melbourne, Australia (indoor hard)
Chinese Taipei	0
Australia	3

Second Round
Seoul, South Korea (clay)
New Zealand	3
South Korea	2
Osaka, Japan (hard)
Japan	0
Australia	5

- Chinese Taipei relegated to Group II in 1997.
- New Zealand and Australia advance to World Group qualifying round.

== First round ==
=== New Zealand vs. China ===
New Zealand
4
Wilding Park, Christchurch, New Zealand
9–11 February 1996
Grass

China
1

			1	2	3	4	5
1	(New Zealand) (China)	Brett Steven; Zheng Yu	6; 0	6; 1	6; 2
2	(New Zealand) (China)	Alistair Hunt; Xia Jiaping	3; 6	6; 3	4; 6	5; 7
3	(New Zealand) (China)	James Greenhalgh / Brett Steven; Xia Jiaping / Xu Xin	6; 0	6; 1	6; 1
4	(New Zealand) (China)	Brett Steven; Xia Jiaping	6; 4	6; 2	6; 1
5	(New Zealand) (China)	Alistair Hunt; Zheng Yu	6; 1	6; 4

=== Indonesia vs. South Korea ===
Indonesia
1
Gelora Senayan Sports Complex, Jakarta, Indonesia
9–12 February 1996
Clay

South Korea
4

			1	2	3	4	5
1	(Indonesia) (South Korea)	Suwandi Suwandi; Yoon Yong-il	4; 6	0; 6	2; 6
2	(Indonesia) (South Korea)	Andrian Raturandang; Lee Hyung-taik	2; 6	6; 4	2; 6	2; 6
3	(Indonesia) (South Korea)	Edi Kusdaryanto / Suwandi Suwandi; Chang Eui-jong / Lee Hyung-taik	4; 6	6^{3} 7^{7}	7^{10} 6^{8}	6; 3	6; 2
4	(Indonesia) (South Korea)	Suwandi Suwandi; Lee Hyung-taik	6; 3	2; 6	4; 6	3; 6
5	(Indonesia) (South Korea)	Andrian Raturandang; Yoon Yong-il	6^{3} 7^{7}	6; 4	6^{5} 7^{7}

=== Japan vs. Philippines ===
Japan
5
Ryokuchi Park Gym, Yokkaichi, Japan
9–11 February 1996
Carpet (indoors)

Philippines
0

			1	2	3	4	5
1	(Japan) (Philippines)	Shuzo Matsuoka; Sofronio Palahang	6; 1	6; 0	6; 2
2	(Japan) (Philippines)	Hideki Kaneko; Joseph Lizardo	6; 4	6; 0	6; 1
3	(Japan) (Philippines)	Satoshi Iwabuchi / Takao Suzuki; Robert Angelo / Sofronio Palahang	6; 2	6; 3	6; 2
4	(Japan) (Philippines)	Takao Suzuki; Joseph Lizardo	6; 0	6; 3
5	(Japan) (Philippines)	Hideki Kaneko; Sofronio Palahang	6; 2	6; 1

=== Australia vs. Chinese Taipei ===
Australia
3
Flinders Park, Melbourne, Australia
9–11 February 1996
Hard (indoors)

Chinese Taipei
0

			1	2	3	4	5
1	(Australia) (Chinese Taipei)	Jason Stoltenberg; Chen Chih-jung	6; 1	6; 2	7^{7} 6^{1}
2	(Australia) (Chinese Taipei)	Todd Woodbridge; Chen Wei-ju	6; 2	6; 1	6; 2
3	(Australia) (Chinese Taipei)	Richard Fromberg / Todd Woodbridge; Chen Chih-jung / Lien Yu-hui	6; 4	6; 4	6; 2
4	(Australia) (Chinese Taipei)	Todd Woodbridge; Chen Chih-jung						not played
5	(Australia) (Chinese Taipei)	Jason Stoltenberg; Chen Wei-ju						not played

== Second round ==
=== South Korea vs. New Zealand ===
South Korea
2
Jang-Choong Tennis Centre, Seoul, South Korea
5–7 April 1996
Clay

New Zealand
3

			1	2	3	4	5
1	(South Korea) (New Zealand)	Lee Hyung-taik; Steven Downs	7; 5	6; 1	6; 1
2	(South Korea) (New Zealand)	Yoon Yong-il; Brett Steven	3; 6	6; 1	2; 6	2; 6
3	(South Korea) (New Zealand)	Lee Hyung-taik / Lee Jong-min; Alistair Hunt / Brett Steven	6; 4	1; 6	2; 6	6^{4} 7^{7}
4	(South Korea) (New Zealand)	Yoon Yong-il; Steven Downs	2; 6	6; 2	6; 4	7; 5
5	(South Korea) (New Zealand)	Lee Hyung-taik; Brett Steven	4; 6	6; 3	3; 6	6^{7} 7^{9}

=== Japan vs. Australia ===
Japan
0
Utsubo Tennis Centre, Osaka, Japan
5–7 April 1996
Hard

Australia
5

			1	2	3	4	5
1	(Japan) (Australia)	Hideki Kaneko; Todd Woodbridge	6; 4	7^{7} 6^{4}	5; 7	2; 6	2; 6
2	(Japan) (Australia)	Shuzo Matsuoka; Jason Stoltenberg	4; 6	6; 3	3; 6	6; 3	4; 5	retired
3	(Japan) (Australia)	Satoshi Iwabuchi / Takao Suzuki; Todd Woodbridge / Mark Woodforde	3; 6	1; 6	3; 6
4	(Japan) (Australia)	Shuzo Matsuoka; Todd Woodbridge	3; 6	2; 6
5	(Japan) (Australia)	Hideki Kaneko; Jason Stoltenberg	1; 6	2; 6

== First round relegation play-offs ==
=== Indonesia vs. China ===
Indonesia
0
Gelora Senayan Sports Complex, Jakarta, Indonesia
5–7 April 1996
Clay

China
5

			1	2	3	4	5
1	(Indonesia) (China)	Andrian Raturandang; Pan Bing	0; 6	1; 6	5; 7
2	(Indonesia) (China)	Suwandi Suwandi; Xia Jiaping	6; 3	6; 2	1; 6	1; 6	1; 6
3	(Indonesia) (China)	Sebastian Da Costa / Donny Susetyo; Pan Bing / Xia Jiaping	6; 3	4; 6	6; 4	3; 6	4; 6
4	(Indonesia) (China)	Suwandi Suwandi; Pan Bing	3; 6	6^{5} 7^{7}
5	(Indonesia) (China)	Andrian Raturandang; Xia Jiaping	3; 6	4; 6

=== Chinese Taipei vs. Philippines ===
Chinese Taipei
2
Chung-Hsin Tennis Club, Taichung, Taiwan
5–7 April 1996
Clay

Philippines
3

			1	2	3	4	5
1	(Chinese Taipei) (Philippines)	Tsai Chia-yen; Joseph Lizardo	6; 2	2; 6	5; 7	0; 2		retired
2	(Chinese Taipei) (Philippines)	Chen Chih-jung; Sofronio Palahang	6; 1	6; 4	2; 6	0; 6	0; 6
3	(Chinese Taipei) (Philippines)	Chen Chih-jung / Lien Yu-hui; Robert Angelo / Alexander Toledo	7; 5	6; 1	5; 7	1; 6	6; 3
4	(Chinese Taipei) (Philippines)	Chen Chih-jung; Joseph Lizardo	6; 3	6; 3	5; 7	3; 6	3; 6
5	(Chinese Taipei) (Philippines)	Chen Wei-ju; Sofronio Palahang	7; 5	6; 4

== Second round relegation play-offs ==
=== Chinese Taipei vs. Indonesia ===
Chinese Taipei
2
Taipei Tennis Club, Taipei, Taiwan
20–22 September 1996
Hard

Indonesia
3

			1	2	3	4	5
1	(Chinese Taipei) (Indonesia)	Tsai Chia-yen; Bonit Wiryawan	7; 5	6; 4	6; 3
2	(Chinese Taipei) (Indonesia)	Chen Chih-jung; Andrian Raturandang	6; 4	6; 0	6; 3
3	(Chinese Taipei) (Indonesia)	Chen Chih-jung / Lien Yu-hui; Sulistyo Wibowo / Bonit Wiryawan	2; 6	4; 6	2; 6
4	(Chinese Taipei) (Indonesia)	Tsai Chia-yen; Andrian Raturandang	6; 4	5; 7	6^{6} 7^{8}	3; 6
5	(Chinese Taipei) (Indonesia)	Chen Chih-jung; Bonit Wiryawan	2; 6	6; 1	6; 2	5; 7	6; 8
