= 1995 Davis Cup Asia/Oceania Zone Group I =

International tennis competition

The Asia/Oceania Zone was one of the three zones of the regional Davis Cup competition in 1995.

In the Asia/Oceania Zone there were three different tiers, called groups, in which teams competed against each other to advance to the upper tier. Winners in Group I advanced to the World Group qualifying round, along with losing teams from the World Group first round. Teams who lost their respective ties competed in the relegation play-offs, with winning teams remaining in Group I, whereas teams who lost their play-offs were relegated to the Asia/Oceania Zone Group II in 1996.

== Participating nations ==
- Chinese Taipei
- Hong Kong
- India
- Indonesia
- Japan
- New Zealand
- Philippines
- South Korea

=== Draw ===
Second Round Play-offs
Causeway Bay, Hong Kong (hard)
Chinese Taipei	5
Hong Kong	0

First Round Play-offs
Jakarta, Indonesia (clay)
Chinese Taipei	1
Indonesia	4
Fujisawa, Japan (indoor hard)
Japan	5
Hong Kong	0

First Round
Wellington, New Zealand (hard)
New Zealand	5
Chinese Taipei	0
Seoul, South Korea (indoor carpet)
Indonesia	0
South Korea	5
Manila, Philippines (indoor clay)
Philippines	3
Japan	2
Calcutta, India (grass)
Hong Kong	1
India	4

Second Round
Christchurch, New Zealand (grass)
New Zealand	4
South Korea	1
New Delhi, India (grass)
Philippines	0
India	5

- Hong Kong relegated to Group II in 1996.
- New Zealand and India advance to World Group qualifying round.

== First round ==
=== New Zealand vs. Chinese Taipei ===
New Zealand
5
Renouf Centre, Wellington, New Zealand
3–5 February 1995
Hard

Chinese Taipei
0

			1	2	3	4	5
1	(New Zealand) (Chinese Taipei)	Steven Downs; Lien Yu-hui	6; 4	6; 1	6; 2
2	(New Zealand) (Chinese Taipei)	Brett Steven; Tsai Chia-yen	6; 1	6; 0	6; 0
3	(New Zealand) (Chinese Taipei)	James Greenhalgh / Brett Steven; Chen Wei-ju / Lien Yu-hui	6; 2	6; 3	7; 5
4	(New Zealand) (Chinese Taipei)	Brett Steven; Chen Wei-ju	7^{7} 6^{2}	6; 1
5	(New Zealand) (Chinese Taipei)	Steven Downs; Tsai Chia-yen	6; 1	6; 4

=== South Korea vs. Indonesia ===
South Korea
5
Olympic Gymnasium, Seoul, South Korea
3–5 February 1995
Carpet (indoors)

Indonesia
0

			1	2	3	4	5
1	(South Korea) (Indonesia)	Yoon Yong-il; Bonit Wiryawan	6; 4	7; 5	6; 2
2	(South Korea) (Indonesia)	Lee Hyung-taik; Suwandi Suwandi	6; 2	7^{7} 6^{1}	6; 2
3	(South Korea) (Indonesia)	Chang Eui-jong / Kim Chi-wan; Donny Susetyo / Teddy Tandjung	6; 4	6; 4	1; 6	6; 2
4	(South Korea) (Indonesia)	Yoon Yong-il; Suwandi Suwandi	6; 2	6; 2
5	(South Korea) (Indonesia)	Lee Hyung-taik; Bonit Wiryawan	6; 3	6; 4

=== Philippines vs. Japan ===
Philippines
3
Columbian Association, Manila, Philippines
3–5 February 1995
Clay

Japan
2

			1	2	3	4	5
1	(Philippines) (Japan)	Robert Angelo; Shuzo Matsuoka	4; 6	4; 6	0; 6
2	(Philippines) (Japan)	Joseph Lizardo; Ryuso Tsujino	6; 2	6; 2	6; 0
3	(Philippines) (Japan)	Robert Angelo / Sofronio Palahang; Shuzo Matsuoka / Takao Suzuki	3; 6	3; 6	3; 6
4	(Philippines) (Japan)	Joseph Lizardo; Shuzo Matsuoka	4; 6	6; 3	0; 6	6; 2	1; 0	retired
5	(Philippines) (Japan)	Robert Angelo; Ryuso Tsujino	6; 0	6; 2	6; 1

=== India vs. Hong Kong ===
India
4
Calcutta South Club, Calcutta, India
3–5 February 1995
Grass

Hong Kong
1

			1	2	3	4	5
1	(India) (Hong Kong)	Leander Paes; Thorsten Poelzl	6; 3	6; 3	6; 0
2	(India) (Hong Kong)	Mahesh Bhupathi; Sven Koehler	6; 0	6; 4	6; 3
3	(India) (Hong Kong)	Gaurav Natekar / Leander Paes; Sven Koehler / Thorsten Poelzl	6; 4	6; 2	6; 1
4	(India) (Hong Kong)	Leander Paes; John Hui	6; 3	6; 1
5	(India) (Hong Kong)	Mahesh Bhupathi; Thorsten Poelzl	6^{6} 7^{8}	5; 7

== Second round ==
=== New Zealand vs. South Korea ===
New Zealand
4
Wilding Park, Christchurch, New Zealand
31 March–2 April 1995
Grass

South Korea
1

			1	2	3	4	5
1	(New Zealand) (South Korea)	James Greenhalgh; Yoon Yong-il	5; 7	2; 6	6; 3	6; 4	6; 4
2	(New Zealand) (South Korea)	Brett Steven; Chang Eui-jong	6; 4	6; 4	6; 4
3	(New Zealand) (South Korea)	James Greenhalgh / Brett Steven; Chang Eui-jong / Kim Chi-wan	6; 3	6; 2	7^{7} 6^{3}
4	(New Zealand) (South Korea)	Scott Clark; Lee Hyung-taik	3; 6	4; 6
5	(New Zealand) (South Korea)	James Greenhalgh; Chang Eui-jong	3; 6	7; 5	7; 5

=== India vs. Philippines ===
India
5
National Sports Club, New Delhi, India
31 March–2 April 1995
Grass

Philippines
0

			1	2	3	4	5
1	(India) (Philippines)	Leander Paes; Sofronio Palahang	6; 2	6; 0	6; 3
2	(India) (Philippines)	Mahesh Bhupathi; Robert Angelo	6; 1	6; 3	6; 4
3	(India) (Philippines)	Gaurav Natekar / Leander Paes; Robert Angelo / Sofronio Palahang	6; 4	6^{5} 7^{7}	6; 4	6; 1
4	(India) (Philippines)	Leander Paes; Robert Angelo	6; 3	6; 4
5	(India) (Philippines)	Mahesh Bhupathi; Sofronio Palahang	6; 4	6; 2

== First round relegation play-offs ==
=== Indonesia vs. Chinese Taipei ===
Indonesia
4
Gelora Senayan Sports Complex, Jakarta, Indonesia
31 March–2 April 1995
Clay

Chinese Taipei
1

			1	2	3	4	5
1	(Indonesia) (Chinese Taipei)	Suwandi Suwandi; Chen Wei-ju	6; 4	5; 7	6; 4	6; 2
2	(Indonesia) (Chinese Taipei)	Bonit Wiryawan; Chen Chih-jung	6; 3	6^{5} 7^{7}	6; 4	6; 3
3	(Indonesia) (Chinese Taipei)	Donny Susetyo / Teddy Tandjung; Chen Chih-jung / Lien Yu-hui	6; 2	6; 2	4; 6	6; 4
4	(Indonesia) (Chinese Taipei)	Suwandi Suwandi; Chen Chih-jung	6; 4	7; 5
5	(Indonesia) (Chinese Taipei)	Bonit Wiryawan; Chen Wei-ju	1; 6	6; 3	3; 6

=== Japan vs. Hong Kong ===
Japan
5
Ebara Shonan Sports Centre, Fujisawa, Japan
31 March–2 April 1995
Hard (indoors)

Hong Kong
0

			1	2	3	4	5
1	(Japan) (Hong Kong)	Takao Suzuki; Thorsten Poelzl	6; 1	6; 3	6; 3
2	(Japan) (Hong Kong)	Shuzo Matsuoka; Melvin Tong	7; 5	6; 1	6; 1
3	(Japan) (Hong Kong)	Satoshi Iwabuchi / Gouichi Motomura; John Hui / Thorsten Poelzl	6; 3	7; 5	6; 3
4	(Japan) (Hong Kong)	Shuzo Matsuoka; Thorsten Poelzl	6; 4	6; 4
5	(Japan) (Hong Kong)	Takao Suzuki; Melvin Tong	6; 3	6; 1

== Second round relegation play-offs ==
=== Hong Kong vs. Chinese Taipei ===
Hong Kong
0
Victoria Park, Causeway Bay, Hong Kong
22–24 September 1995
Hard

Chinese Taipei
5

			1	2	3	4	5
1	(Hong Kong) (Chinese Taipei)	Sven Koehler; Tsai Chia-yen	3; 6	6; 2	4; 6	3; 6
2	(Hong Kong) (Chinese Taipei)	Thorsten Poelzl; Chen Chih-jung	6^{5} 7^{7}	6; 4	6; 3	4; 6	1; 6
3	(Hong Kong) (Chinese Taipei)	Sven Koehler / Thorsten Poelzl; Chen Chih-jung / Hung Chiao-hsy	6; 2	2; 6	3; 6	7^{8} 6^{6}	3; 6
4	(Hong Kong) (Chinese Taipei)	Sven Koehler; Chen Wei-ju	1; 6	6; 1	4; 6
5	(Hong Kong) (Chinese Taipei)	John Hui; Tsai Chia-yen	4; 6	1; 6
