= 2000 Davis Cup Asia/Oceania Zone Group II =

International tennis competition

The Asia/Oceania Zone was one of the three zones of the regional Davis Cup competition in 2000.

In the Asia/Oceania Zone there were four different tiers, called groups, in which teams compete against each other to advance to the upper tier. Winners in Group II advanced to the Asia/Oceania Zone Group I. Teams who lost their respective ties competed in the relegation play-offs, with winning teams remaining in Group II, whereas teams who lost their play-offs were relegated to the Asia/Oceania Zone Group III in 2001.

== Participating nations ==
- Chinese Taipei
- Hong Kong
- Indonesia
- Iran
- Kazakhstan
- Malaysia
- Pakistan
- Philippines

=== Draw ===
Relegation Play-offs
Causeway Bay, Hong Kong (hard)
Hong Kong	3
Kazakhstan	2
Manila, Philippines (clay)
Iran	3
Philippines	2

First Round
Causeway Bay, Hong Kong (hard)
Pakistan	3
Hong Kong	2
Almaty, Kazakhstan (indoor hard)
Chinese Taipei	4
Kazakhstan	1
Kuala Lumpur, Malaysia (indoor hard)
Iran	2
Malaysia	3
Manila, Philippines (hard)
Indonesia	4
Philippines	1

Second Round
Taichung, Taiwan (clay)
Pakistan	2
Chinese Taipei	3
Kuala Lumpur, Malaysia (indoor hard)
Malaysia	0
Indonesia	5

Third Round
Jakarta, Indonesia (hard)
Chinese Taipei	1
Indonesia	4

- Kazakhstan and Philippines relegated to Group III in 2001.
- Indonesia promoted to Group I in 2001.

== First round ==
=== Hong Kong vs. Pakistan ===
Hong Kong
2
Victoria Park, Causeway Bay, Hong Kong
28–30 January 2000
Hard

Pakistan
3

			1	2	3	4	5
1	(Hong Kong) (Pakistan)	Melvin Tong; Asim Shafik	6; 2	6; 1	6; 4
2	(Hong Kong) (Pakistan)	Wayne Wong; Aisam-ul-Haq Qureshi	7^{9} 6^{7}	4; 6	6; 4	5; 7	3; 6
3	(Hong Kong) (Pakistan)	Melvin Tong / Andrew Town; Aisam-ul-Haq Qureshi / Ahmed Wahla	6^{6} 7^{8}	6; 4	6; 4	3; 6	4; 6
4	(Hong Kong) (Pakistan)	Melvin Tong; Aisam-ul-Haq Qureshi	6; 4	1; 6	4; 6	2; 6
5	(Hong Kong) (Pakistan)	Wayne Wong; Aqeel Khan	7; 5	6; 4

=== Kazakhstan vs. Chinese Taipei ===
Kazakhstan
1
Maks Tennis Club, Almaty, Kazakhstan
4–6 February 2000
Hard (indoors)

Chinese Taipei
4

			1	2	3	4	5
1	(Kazakhstan) (Chinese Taipei)	Pavel Baranov; Cheng Wei-jen	4; 6	4; 6	6; 4	5; 7
2	(Kazakhstan) (Chinese Taipei)	Alexey Kedryuk; Lin Bing-chao	7^{7} 6^{5}	1; 6	4; 6	7; 5	4; 6
3	(Kazakhstan) (Chinese Taipei)	Pavel Baranov / Alexey Kedryuk; Chen Chih-jung / Lin Bing-chao	4; 6	1; 6	6; 4	3; 6
4	(Kazakhstan) (Chinese Taipei)	Alexey Kedryuk; Cheng Wei-jen	7; 5	6; 2
5	(Kazakhstan) (Chinese Taipei)	Dias Doskarayev; Tsai Chia-yen	6; 4	5; 7	1; 6

=== Malaysia vs. Iran ===
Malaysia
3
National Centre, Kuala Lumpur, Malaysia
4–6 February 2000
Hard (indoors)

Iran
2

			1	2	3	4	5
1	(Malaysia) (Iran)	Hazuan Hizan; Ramin Raziani	2; 6	2; 6	1; 6
2	(Malaysia) (Iran)	Selvam Veerasingam; Seyed Akbar Taheri Rahaghi	5; 7	7^{7} 6^{4}	6; 4	4; 6	7; 5
3	(Malaysia) (Iran)	Vasuthevan Ortchuan / Selvam Veerasingam; Ramin Raziani / Seyed Akbar Taheri Rahaghi	3; 6	6; 1	3; 6	4; 6
4	(Malaysia) (Iran)	Selvam Veerasingam; Ramin Raziani	6; 4	6; 4	6; 4
5	(Malaysia) (Iran)	Hazuan Hizan; Seyed Akbar Taheri Rahaghi	6; 4	6; 2	6; 3

=== Philippines vs. Indonesia ===
Philippines
1
Rizal Memorial Tennis Centre, Manila, Philippines
4–6 February 2000
Hard

Indonesia
4

			1	2	3	4	5
1	(Philippines) (Indonesia)	Johnny Arcilla; Suwandi Suwandi	4; 6	2; 6	2; 6
2	(Philippines) (Indonesia)	Adelo Abadia; Febi Widhiyanto	4; 6	2; 6	3; 6
3	(Philippines) (Indonesia)	Adelo Abadia / Johnny Arcilla; Edi Kusdaryanto / Hendri Susilo Pramono	4; 6	2; 6	7^{7} 6^{4}	7; 5	1; 6
4	(Philippines) (Indonesia)	Johnny Arcilla; Febi Widhiyanto	6; 0	3; 6	6; 4
5	(Philippines) (Indonesia)	Rolando Ruel; Suwandi Suwandi	4; 6	1; 6

== Second round ==
=== Chinese Taipei vs. Pakistan ===
Chinese Taipei
3
Chung-Hsin Tennis Club, Taichung, Taiwan
7–9 April 2000
Clay

Pakistan
2

			1	2	3	4	5
1	(Chinese Taipei) (Pakistan)	Lin Bing-chao; Asim Shafik	6; 1	6; 0	6; 0
2	(Chinese Taipei) (Pakistan)	Tsai Chia-yen; Aisam-ul-Haq Qureshi	4; 6	6^{2} 7^{7}	5; 7
3	(Chinese Taipei) (Pakistan)	Cheng Wei-jen / Lin Bing-chao; Aisam-ul-Haq Qureshi / Ahmed Wahla	4; 6	4; 6	4; 6
4	(Chinese Taipei) (Pakistan)	Lin Bing-chao; Aisam-ul-Haq Qureshi	2; 6	6; 2	6; 3	6; 3
5	(Chinese Taipei) (Pakistan)	Tsai Chia-yen; Aqeel Khan	6; 0	6; 3	6; 3

=== Malaysia vs. Indonesia ===
Malaysia
0
National Centre, Kuala Lumpur, Malaysia
7–9 April 2000
Hard (indoors)

Indonesia
5

			1	2	3	4	5
1	(Malaysia) (Indonesia)	Vasuthevan Ortchuan; Suwandi Suwandi	2; 6	2; 6	3; 6
2	(Malaysia) (Indonesia)	Selvam Veerasingam; Febi Widhiyanto	3; 6	3; 6	2; 6
3	(Malaysia) (Indonesia)	Mohammed-Nazreen Fuzi-Nasruddin / Selvam Veerasingam; Sulistyo Wibowo / Bonit Wiryawan	4; 6	2; 6	1; 6
4	(Malaysia) (Indonesia)	Mohammed-Nazreen Fuzi-Nasruddin; Febi Widhiyanto	0; 6	1; 6
5	(Malaysia) (Indonesia)	Adam Jaya; Suwandi Suwandi	1; 6	1; 6

== Relegation play-offs ==
=== Hong Kong vs. Kazakhstan ===
Hong Kong
3
Victoria Park, Causeway Bay, Hong Kong
7–9 April 2000
Hard

Kazakhstan
2

			1	2	3	4	5
1	(Hong Kong) (Kazakhstan)	Melvin Tong; Pavel Baranov	3; 6	6; 3	6; 4	7; 5
2	(Hong Kong) (Kazakhstan)	Wayne Wong; Alexey Kedryuk	2; 6	2; 6	2; 6
3	(Hong Kong) (Kazakhstan)	Chris Numbers / Melvin Tong; Pavel Baranov / Alexey Kedryuk	7; 5	7^{8} 6^{6}	6; 1
4	(Hong Kong) (Kazakhstan)	Melvin Tong; Alexey Kedryuk	3; 6	6; 3	1; 6	6; 3	2; 6
5	(Hong Kong) (Kazakhstan)	Wayne Wong; Pavel Baranov	6; 4	4; 6	7^{7} 6^{5}	6; 2

=== Philippines vs. Iran ===
Philippines
2
Philippine Columbian Association, Manila, Philippines
17–19 March 2000
Clay

Iran
3

			1	2	3	4	5
1	(Philippines) (Iran)	Johnny Arcilla; Mohammed-Reza Tavakoli	6; 3	6; 4	6; 3
2	(Philippines) (Iran)	Adelo Abadia; Ramin Raziani	6^{7} 7^{9}	6^{4} 7^{7}	2; 6
3	(Philippines) (Iran)	Johnny Arcilla / Michael-John Misa; Ramin Raziani / Seyed Akbar Taheri Rahaghi	6; 3	3; 6	6; 3	7^{7} 6^{5}
4	(Philippines) (Iran)	Johnny Arcilla; Ramin Raziani	4; 6	4; 6	6^{5} 7^{7}
5	(Philippines) (Iran)	Rolando Ruel; Anoosha Shahgholi	6; 4	3; 6	3; 6	1; 6

== Third round ==
=== Indonesia vs. Chinese Taipei ===
Indonesia
4
Kemayoran Tennis Club, Jakarta, Indonesia
6–8 October 2000
Hard

Chinese Taipei
1

			1	2	3	4	5
1	(Indonesia) (Chinese Taipei)	Suwandi Suwandi; Cheng Wei-jen	6; 4	6; 2	6; 2
2	(Indonesia) (Chinese Taipei)	Hendri Susilo Pramono; Tsai Chia-yen	6; 4	7^{7} 6^{3}	6; 3
3	(Indonesia) (Chinese Taipei)	Sulistyo Wibowo / Bonit Wiryawan; Chen Wei-ju / Cheng Wei-jen	6; 3	6; 4	6; 4
4	(Indonesia) (Chinese Taipei)	Suwandi Suwandi; Tsai Chia-yen	6; 3	5; 7	6; 1
5	(Indonesia) (Chinese Taipei)	Hendri Susilo Pramono; Cheng Wei-jen	4; 6	2; 6
