= 1997 Davis Cup Asia/Oceania Zone Group I =

International tennis competition

The Asia/Oceania Zone was one of the three zones of the regional Davis Cup competition in 1997.

In the Asia/Oceania Zone there were four different tiers, called groups, in which teams competed against each other to advance to the upper tier. Winners in Group I advanced to the World Group qualifying round, along with losing teams from the World Group first round. Teams who lost their respective ties competed in the relegation play-offs, with winning teams remaining in Group I, whereas teams who lost their play-offs were relegated to the Asia/Oceania Zone Group II in 1998.

== Participating nations ==
- China
- Indonesia
- Japan
- New Zealand
- Philippines
- South Korea
- Uzbekistan

=== Draw ===
Second Round Play-offs
Tashkent, Uzbekistan (hard)
Philippines	0
Uzbekistan	5

First Round Play-offs
bye
Philippines
Tashkent, Uzbekistan (clay)
Uzbekistan	2
Japan	3

First Round
New Zealand
bye
Manila, Philippines (indoor clay)
Philippines	2
Indonesia	3
Beijing, China (indoor hard)
Uzbekistan	1
China	4
Seoul, South Korea (indoor carpet)
South Korea	3
Japan	2

Second Round
Jakarta, Indonesia (clay)
New Zealand	5
Indonesia	0
Beijing, China (indoor carpet)
China	1
South Korea	4

- Philippines relegated to Group II in 1998.
- New Zealand and South Korea advance to World Group qualifying round.

== First round ==
=== Philippines vs. Indonesia ===
Philippines
2
Philippine Columbian Association, Manila, Philippines
7–9 February 1997
Clay (indoors)

Indonesia
3

			1	2	3	4	5
1	(Philippines) (Indonesia)	Robert Angelo; Suwandi Suwandi	7^{10} 6^{8}	7^{7} 6^{5}	6; 3
2	(Philippines) (Indonesia)	Joseph Lizardo; Andrian Raturandang	6; 4	5; 7	7; 5	6; 2
3	(Philippines) (Indonesia)	Michael-John Misa / Pio Tolentino; Sulistyo Wibowo / Bonit Wiryawan	1; 6	4; 6	0; 6
4	(Philippines) (Indonesia)	Joseph Lizardo; Suwandi Suwandi	2; 6	6; 1	3; 6	7; 5	2; 6
5	(Philippines) (Indonesia)	Robert Angelo; Bonit Wiryawan	3; 6	6; 1	6; 4	1; 6	3; 6

=== China vs. Uzbekistan ===
China
4
University Gymnasium, Beijing, China
4–6 February 1997
Hard

Uzbekistan
1

			1	2	3	4	5
1	(China) (Uzbekistan)	Xia Jiaping; Dmitri Tomashevich	6; 4	7^{7} 6^{5}	6; 3
2	(China) (Uzbekistan)	Pan Bing; Oleg Ogorodov	2; 6	4; 6	5; 7
3	(China) (Uzbekistan)	Pan Bing / Xia Jiaping; Oleg Ogorodov / Dmitri Tomashevich	7^{7} 6^{4}	6; 3	2; 6	6; 2
4	(China) (Uzbekistan)	Xia Jiaping; Oleg Ogorodov	6; 4	4; 6	7^{7} 6^{5}	7^{9} 6^{7}
5	(China) (Uzbekistan)	Pan Bing; Dmitri Tomashevich	6; 4	7^{7} 6^{3}

=== South Korea vs. Japan ===
South Korea
3
Olympic Gymnasium, Seoul, South Korea
7–9 February 1997
Carpet (indoors)

Japan
2

			1	2	3	4	5
1	(South Korea) (Japan)	Yoon Yong-il; Takao Suzuki	1; 6	7; 5	6; 3	6; 1
2	(South Korea) (Japan)	Lee Hyung-taik; Shuzo Matsuoka	6^{5} 7^{7}	3; 6	6^{3} 7^{7}
3	(South Korea) (Japan)	Lee Hyung-taik / Yoon Yong-il; Satoshi Iwabuchi / Takao Suzuki	3; 6	4; 6	6; 3	6; 4	6; 8
4	(South Korea) (Japan)	Yoon Yong-il; Shuzo Matsuoka	6; 2	6; 4	6; 3
5	(South Korea) (Japan)	Lee Hyung-taik; Takao Suzuki	3; 6	6; 4	1; 6	6; 4	6; 4

== Second round ==
=== Indonesia vs. New Zealand ===
Indonesia
0
Gelora Senayan Sports Complex, Jakarta, Indonesia
4–6 April 1996
Clay

New Zealand
5

			1	2	3	4	5
1	(Indonesia) (New Zealand)	Suwandi Suwandi; Mark Nielsen	5; 7	3; 6	4; 6
2	(Indonesia) (New Zealand)	Andrian Raturandang; Alistair Hunt	3; 6	0; 6	3; 6
3	(Indonesia) (New Zealand)	Sulistyo Wibowo / Bonit Wiryawan; James Greenhalgh / Alistair Hunt	3; 6	4; 6	6; 3	3; 6
4	(Indonesia) (New Zealand)	Suwandi Suwandi; Glenn Wilson	4; 6	5; 7
5	(Indonesia) (New Zealand)	Andrian Raturandang; Mark Nielsen	2; 6	5; 7

=== China vs. South Korea ===
China
1
International Centre, Beijing, China
4–6 April 1996
Carpet (indoors)

South Korea
4

			1	2	3	4	5
1	(China) (South Korea)	Xia Jiaping; Lee Hyung-taik	1; 6	6; 2	6; 2	6^{3} 7^{7}	1; 6
2	(China) (South Korea)	Pan Bing; Yoon Yong-il	3; 6	4; 6	2; 6
3	(China) (South Korea)	Pan Bing / Xia Jiaping; Lee Hyung-taik / Yoon Yong-il	4; 6	6; 3	2; 6	4; 6
4	(China) (South Korea)	Zheng Yu; Yoon Yong-il	3; 6	5; 7
5	(China) (South Korea)	Pan Bing; Kim Dong-hyun	7^{7} 6^{5}	6; 4

== First round relegation play-offs ==
=== Uzbekistan vs. Japan ===
Uzbekistan
2
Dynamo Tennis Club, Tashkent, Uzbekistan
11–13 July 1997
Clay

Japan
3

			1	2	3	4	5
1	(Uzbekistan) (Japan)	Oleg Ogorodov; Hideki Kaneko	6; 1	7; 5	4; 6	6; 3
2	(Uzbekistan) (Japan)	Dmitri Tomashevich; Gouichi Motomura	1; 6	6; 2	1; 6	3; 6
3	(Uzbekistan) (Japan)	Vadim Kutsenko / Oleg Ogorodov; Satoshi Iwabuchi / Takao Suzuki	3; 6	4; 6	2; 6
4	(Uzbekistan) (Japan)	Oleg Ogorodov; Gouichi Motomura	6; 2	6; 2	6; 2
5	(Uzbekistan) (Japan)	Dmitri Tomashevich; Hideki Kaneko	3; 6	6; 4	1; 6	4; 6

== Second round relegation play-offs ==
=== Uzbekistan vs. Philippines ===
Uzbekistan
5
Dynamo Tennis Club, Tashkent, Uzbekistan
19–21 September 1997
Hard

Philippines
0

			1	2	3	4	5
1	(Uzbekistan) (Philippines)	Oleg Ogorodov; Michael-John Misa	6; 3	6; 3	6; 0
2	(Uzbekistan) (Philippines)	Dmitri Tomashevich; Joseph Lizardo	4; 6	6; 2	6; 2	7; 5
3	(Uzbekistan) (Philippines)	Oleg Ogorodov / Dmitri Tomashevich; Robert Angelo / Joseph Lizardo	6; 2	6; 1	6; 3
4	(Uzbekistan) (Philippines)	Oleg Ogorodov; Joseph Lizardo	6; 3	6; 4
5	(Uzbekistan) (Philippines)	Dmitri Tomashevich; Michael-John Misa	6; 1	6; 1
