= 2001 Davis Cup Asia/Oceania Zone Group I =

International tennis competition

The Asia/Oceania Zone was one of the three zones of the regional Davis Cup competition in 2001.

In the Asia/Oceania Zone there were four different tiers, called groups, in which teams competed against each other to advance to the upper tier. Winners in Group I advanced to the World Group qualifying round, along with losing teams from the World Group first round. Teams who lost their respective ties competed in the relegation play-offs, with winning teams remaining in Group I, whereas teams who lost their play-offs were relegated to the Asia/Oceania Zone Group II in 2002.

== Participating nations ==
- China
- India
- Indonesia
- Japan
- New Zealand
- South Korea
- Thailand
- Uzbekistan

=== Draw ===
Second Round Play-offs
Jakarta, Indonesia (hard)
Indonesia	4
China	1

First Round Play-offs
Seoul, South Korea (hard)
Indonesia	1
South Korea	4
Nonthaburi, Thailand (hard)
Thailand	5
China	0

First Round
Jakarta, Indonesia (hard)
Uzbekistan	3
Indonesia	2
Seoul, South Korea (indoor carpet)
South Korea	2
New Zealand	3
Tokyo, Japan (indoor hard)
Thailand	1
Japan	4
Langfang, China (indoor hard)
China	2
India	3

Second Round
Invercargill, NZ (indoor carpet)
Uzbekistan	3
New Zealand	2
Tokyo, Japan (indoor hard)
Japan	2
India	3

- China relegated to Group II in 2002.
- Uzbekistan and India advance to World Group qualifying round.

== First round ==
=== Indonesia vs. Uzbekistan ===
Indonesia
2
Pusat Danamon, Jakarta, Indonesia
9–11 February 2001
Hard

Uzbekistan
3

			1	2	3	4	5
1	(Indonesia) (Uzbekistan)	Suwandi Suwandi; Oleg Ogorodov	7^{8} 6^{6}	5; 7	1; 6	0; 6
2	(Indonesia) (Uzbekistan)	Andrian Raturandang; Vadim Kutsenko	2; 6	7^{7} 6^{4}	4; 6	3; 6
3	(Indonesia) (Uzbekistan)	Sulistyo Wibowo / Bonit Wiryawan; Oleg Ogorodov / Dmitri Tomashevich	6; 4	3; 6	6; 4	6; 2
4	(Indonesia) (Uzbekistan)	Suwandi Suwandi; Vadim Kutsenko	7^{7} 6^{4}	6; 4	7; 5
5	(Indonesia) (Uzbekistan)	Andrian Raturandang; Oleg Ogorodov	3; 6	1; 6	4; 6

=== South Korea vs. New Zealand ===
South Korea
2
Olympic Gymnasium, Seoul, South Korea
9–11 February 2001
Carpet (indoors)

New Zealand
3

			1	2	3	4	5
1	(South Korea) (New Zealand)	Lee Hyung-taik; Alistair Hunt	7; 5	6; 2	7^{11} 6^{9}
2	(South Korea) (New Zealand)	Lee Seung-hoon; Mark Nielsen	6^{5} 7^{7}	3; 6	6; 4	6; 3	7; 9
3	(South Korea) (New Zealand)	Baek Seung-bok / Lee Hyung-taik; James Greenhalgh / Alistair Hunt	7; 5	5; 7	6^{7} 7^{9}	5; 7
4	(South Korea) (New Zealand)	Lee Hyung-taik; Mark Nielsen	6; 0	6; 1	7^{7} 6^{4}
5	(South Korea) (New Zealand)	Baek Seung-bok; Alistair Hunt	2; 6	7^{7} 6^{5}	6^{6} 7^{8}	7^{7} 6^{5}	4; 6

=== Japan vs. Thailand ===
Japan
4
Ariake Coliseum, Tokyo, Japan
9–11 February 2001
Hard (indoors)

Thailand
1

			1	2	3	4	5
1	(Japan) (Thailand)	Gouichi Motomura; Paradorn Srichaphan	1; 6	5; 7	4; 6
2	(Japan) (Thailand)	Takao Suzuki; Danai Udomchoke	6; 3	6; 3	6; 0
3	(Japan) (Thailand)	Thomas Shimada / Takao Suzuki; Vittaya Samrej / Narathorn Srichaphan	6; 3	6; 4	6; 3
4	(Japan) (Thailand)	Takao Suzuki; Paradorn Srichaphan	7^{7} 6^{5}	7^{8} 6^{6}	6; 1
5	(Japan) (Thailand)	Gouichi Motomura; Danai Udomchoke	6; 3	6; 2

=== China vs. India ===
China
2
East University City Sports Centre, Langfang, China
9–11 February 2001
Hard (indoors)

India
3

			1	2	3	4	5
1	(China) (India)	Wang Yu; Leander Paes	6; 4	0; 6	0; 6	4; 6
2	(China) (India)	Zhang Yu; Syed Fazaluddin	6; 4	6; 1	6; 0
3	(China) (India)	Xu Ran / Yang Jingzhu; Mahesh Bhupathi / Leander Paes	2; 6	4; 6	4; 6
4	(China) (India)	Zhang Yu; Leander Paes	0; 6	2; 6	3; 6
5	(China) (India)	Yang Jingzhu; Syed Fazaluddin	6^{5} 7^{7}	6; 3	6; 4

== Second round ==
=== New Zealand vs. Uzbekistan ===
New Zealand
2
Southland Stadium, Invercargill, New Zealand
6–8 April 2001
Carpet (indoors)

Uzbekistan
3

			1	2	3	4	5
1	(New Zealand) (Uzbekistan)	Mark Nielsen; Vadim Kutsenko	6^{4} 7^{7}	1; 6	7^{7} 6^{5}	2; 6
2	(New Zealand) (Uzbekistan)	Alistair Hunt; Oleg Ogorodov	6^{5} 7^{7}	7^{7} 6^{5}	7^{7} 6^{4}	6; 3
3	(New Zealand) (Uzbekistan)	James Greenhalgh / Alistair Hunt; Oleg Ogorodov / Dmitri Tomashevich	6; 3	6; 4	6; 4
4	(New Zealand) (Uzbekistan)	Mark Nielsen; Oleg Ogorodov	1; 6	6; 3	3; 6	6^{1} 7^{7}
5	(New Zealand) (Uzbekistan)	Alistair Hunt; Vadim Kutsenko	6; 2	6^{1} 7^{7}	4; 6	5; 7

=== Japan vs. India ===
Japan
2
Ariake Coliseum, Tokyo, Japan
6–8 April 2001
Hard (indoors)

India
3

			1	2	3	4	5
1	(Japan) (India)	Yaoki Ishii; Leander Paes	1; 6	1; 6	3; 6
2	(Japan) (India)	Takao Suzuki; Mahesh Bhupathi	6; 1	6; 0	6; 2
3	(Japan) (India)	Thomas Shimada / Takao Suzuki; Mahesh Bhupathi / Leander Paes	4; 6	6; 3	6; 2	2; 6	3; 6
4	(Japan) (India)	Takao Suzuki; Leander Paes	7^{7} 6^{4}	1; 6	7^{7} 6^{5}	4; 6	4; 6
5	(Japan) (India)	Gouichi Motomura; Harsh Mankad	6^{5} 7^{7}	6; 2	6; 3

== First round relegation play-offs ==
=== South Korea vs. Indonesia ===
South Korea
4
Seoul, South Korea
6–8 April 2001
Hard

Indonesia
1

			1	2	3	4	5
1	(South Korea) (Indonesia)	Lee Hyung-taik; Andrian Raturandang	6; 1	4; 6	6; 2	6; 1
2	(South Korea) (Indonesia)	Yoon Yong-il; Suwandi Suwandi	6; 3	7^{7} 6^{3}	6; 2
3	(South Korea) (Indonesia)	Lee Hyung-taik / Yoon Yong-il; Sulistyo Wibowo / Bonit Wiryawan	6^{4} 7^{7}	0; 6	6; 4	6; 4	6; 1
4	(South Korea) (Indonesia)	Lee Seung-hoon; Suwandi Suwandi	4; 6	4; 6
5	(South Korea) (Indonesia)	Kim Dong-hyun; Andrian Raturandang	6; 1	6; 2

=== Thailand vs. China ===
Thailand
5
Nonthaburi, Thailand
6–8 April 2001
Hard

China
0

			1	2	3	4	5
1	(Thailand) (China)	Paradorn Srichaphan; Wang Yu	7; 5	6; 4	6; 2
2	(Thailand) (China)	Danai Udomchoke; Zhang Yu	6; 1	4; 6	2; 6	6; 0	6; 2
3	(Thailand) (China)	Vittaya Samrej / Narathorn Srichaphan; Xu Ran / Zhang Yu	3; 6	6^{4} 7^{7}	6; 0	6; 3	6; 2
4	(Thailand) (China)	Paradorn Srichaphan; Zhang Yu	4; 6	7^{7} 6^{5}	6; 2
5	(Thailand) (China)	Danai Udomchoke; Wang Yu	6; 0	7; 5

== Second round relegation play-offs ==
=== Indonesia vs. China ===
Indonesia
4
Pusat Danamon, Jakarta, Indonesia
21–23 September 2001
Hard

China
1

			1	2	3	4	5
1	(Indonesia) (China)	Peter Handoyo; Zhang Yu	6; 2	3; 6	6; 4	6; 1
2	(Indonesia) (China)	Suwandi Suwandi; Zhu Benqiang	6^{5} 7^{7}	6; 2	6; 0	4; 6	4; 6
3	(Indonesia) (China)	Sulistyo Wibowo / Bonit Wiryawan; Li Si / Yang Jingzhu	3; 6	5; 7	7^{7} 6^{4}	6; 4	6; 2
4	(Indonesia) (China)	Suwandi Suwandi; Zhang Yu	6; 3	6; 0	6; 0
5	(Indonesia) (China)	Peter Handoyo; Zhu Benqiang	6; 4	4; 6	6; 4
