= 1998 Davis Cup Asia/Oceania Zone Group I =

International tennis competition

The Asia/Oceania Zone was one of the three zones of the regional Davis Cup competition in 1998.

In the Asia/Oceania Zone there were four different tiers, called groups, in which teams competed against each other to advance to the upper tier. Winners in Group I advanced to the World Group qualifying round, along with losing teams from the World Group first round. Teams who lost their respective ties competed in the relegation play-offs, with winning teams remaining in Group I, whereas teams who lost their play-offs were relegated to the Asia/Oceania Zone Group II in 1999.

== Participating nations ==
- China
- Indonesia
- Japan
- Lebanon
- New Zealand
- South Korea
- Uzbekistan

=== Draw ===
Second Round Play-offs
Yanji, China (hard)
China	5
Indonesia	0

First Round Play-offs
Seoul, South Korea (hard)
South Korea	4
China	1
Zouk Mikael, Lebanon (indoor hard)
Indonesia	2
Lebanon	3

First Round
South Korea
bye
Tashkent, Uzbekistan (indoor hard)
Uzbekistan	5
China	0
Sapporo, Japan (indoor carpet)
Indonesia	0
Japan	5
Beirut, Lebanon (indoor hard)
Lebanon	2
New Zealand	3

Second Round
Seoul, South Korea (clay)
South Korea	1
Uzbekistan	3
Miyazaki, Japan (clay)
Japan	3
New Zealand	2

- Indonesia relegated to Group II in 1999.
- Uzbekistan and Japan advance to World Group qualifying round.

== First round ==
=== Uzbekistan vs. China ===
Uzbekistan
5
Yunusabad, Tashkent, Uzbekistan
13–15 February 1998
Hard (indoors)

China
0

			1	2	3	4	5
1	(Uzbekistan) (China)	Vadim Kutsenko; Wang Yuwei	6; 2	6; 2	6; 1
2	(Uzbekistan) (China)	Oleg Ogorodov; Zhang Yu	6; 3	3; 6	6; 1	6; 4
3	(Uzbekistan) (China)	Oleg Ogorodov / Dmitri Tomashevich; Lu Ling / Zheng Yu	3; 6	7^{8} 6^{6}	6; 4	6; 4
4	(Uzbekistan) (China)	Oleg Ogorodov; Zheng Yu	6; 4	6; 4
5	(Uzbekistan) (China)	Vadim Kutsenko; Zhang Yu	6; 3	3; 6	6; 0

=== Japan vs. Indonesia ===
Japan
5
Tsukisamu Green Dome, Sapporo, Japan
13–15 February 1998
Carpet (indoors)

Indonesia
0

			1	2	3	4	5
1	(Japan) (Indonesia)	Takao Suzuki; Andrian Raturandang	6; 1	6; 4	6; 4
2	(Japan) (Indonesia)	Gouichi Motomura; Dede Suhendar Dinata	6; 1	6; 3	6; 2
3	(Japan) (Indonesia)	Satoshi Iwabuchi / Takao Suzuki; Andrian Raturandang / Sulistyo Wibowo	6; 4	7^{8} 6^{6}	6; 3
4	(Japan) (Indonesia)	Gouichi Motomura; Andrian Raturandang	6; 3	6; 2
5	(Japan) (Indonesia)	Takao Suzuki; Dede Suhendar Dinata	6; 3	6; 4

=== Lebanon vs. New Zealand ===
Lebanon
2
E.D.L., Beirut, Lebanon
13–15 February 1998
Hard (indoors)

New Zealand
3

			1	2	3	4	5
1	(Lebanon) (New Zealand)	Ali Hamadeh; Alistair Hunt	4; 6	4; 6	4; 6
2	(Lebanon) (New Zealand)	Jicham Zaatini; James Greenhalgh	6; 4	6; 2	7; 5
3	(Lebanon) (New Zealand)	Ali Hamadeh / Jicham Zaatini; James Greenhalgh / Alistair Hunt	3; 6	4; 6	2; 6
4	(Lebanon) (New Zealand)	Jicham Zaatini; Alistair Hunt	5; 7	6^{4} 7^{7}	6^{8} 7^{10}
5	(Lebanon) (New Zealand)	Ali Hamadeh; James Greenhalgh	6; 3	6; 4

== Second round ==
=== South Korea vs. Uzbekistan ===
South Korea
1
Jang Choong Tennis Centre, Seoul, South Korea
3–5 April 1998
Clay

Uzbekistan
3

			1	2	3	4	5
1	(South Korea) (Uzbekistan)	Yoon Yong-il; Vadim Kutsenko	6; 4	4; 6	4; 6	2; 6
2	(South Korea) (Uzbekistan)	Lee Hyung-taik; Oleg Ogorodov	7; 5	6; 2	6; 4
3	(South Korea) (Uzbekistan)	Kim Dong-hyun / Lee Hyung-taik; Oleg Ogorodov / Dmitri Tomashevich	2; 6	6; 4	3; 6	6^{2} 7^{7}
4	(South Korea) (Uzbekistan)	Yoon Yong-il; Oleg Ogorodov	4; 6	7^{7} 6^{4}	4; 6	6^{5} 7^{7}
5	(South Korea) (Uzbekistan)	Lee Hyung-taik; Vadim Kutsenko						not played

=== Japan vs. New Zealand ===
Japan
3
SeaGaia Tennis Centre, Miyazaki, Japan
3–5 April 1998
Clay

New Zealand
2

			1	2	3	4	5
1	(Japan) (New Zealand)	Gouichi Motomura; Teo Susnjak	6; 0	6; 0	6; 0
2	(Japan) (New Zealand)	Takao Suzuki; Brett Steven	7^{7} 6^{4}	7^{7} 6^{5}	7; 5
3	(Japan) (New Zealand)	Satoshi Iwabuchi / Takao Suzuki; James Greenhalgh / Brett Steven	6; 4	3; 6	4; 6	3; 6
4	(Japan) (New Zealand)	Gouichi Motomura; Brett Steven	6; 3	2; 6	6; 3	3; 6	4; 6
5	(Japan) (New Zealand)	Takao Suzuki; Teo Susnjak	6; 4	6^{5} 7^{7}	6; 4	6; 1

== First round relegation play-offs ==
=== South Korea vs. China ===
South Korea
4
Seoul Olympic Park Tennis Center, Seoul, South Korea
17–19 July 1998
Hard

China
1

			1	2	3	4	5
1	(South Korea) (China)	Yoon Yong-il; Yang Jingzhu	6; 3	6; 2	6; 0
2	(South Korea) (China)	Lee Hyung-taik; Wang Yuwei	6; 1	6; 2	6; 2
3	(South Korea) (China)	Kim Dong-hyun / Kim Nam-hoon; Lu Ling / Yang Jingzhu	6; 1	3; 6	6; 2	3; 6	6; 2
4	(South Korea) (China)	Yoon Yong-il; Wang Yuwei	6; 2	3; 6	6^{1} 7^{7}
5	(South Korea) (China)	Lee Hyung-taik; Lu Ling	6; 4	6; 3

=== Lebanon vs. Indonesia ===
Lebanon
3
E.D.L., Zouk Mikael, Lebanon
17–19 July 1998
Hard (indoors)

Indonesia
2

			1	2	3	4	5
1	(Lebanon) (Indonesia)	Ali Hamadeh; Andrian Raturandang	7^{8} 6^{6}	6; 3	7^{7} 6^{5}
2	(Lebanon) (Indonesia)	Jicham Zaatini; Febi Widhiyanto	6; 4	3; 6	6; 3	6; 4
3	(Lebanon) (Indonesia)	Ali Hamadeh / Jicham Zaatini; Sulistyo Wibowo / Bonit Wiryawan	7^{7} 6^{4}	6; 4	6; 4
4	(Lebanon) (Indonesia)	Sean Karam; Andrian Raturandang	2; 6	6; 4	2; 6
5	(Lebanon) (Indonesia)	Alex Zakharia; Febi Widhiyanto	3; 6	5; 7

== Second round relegation play-offs ==
=== China vs. Indonesia ===
China
5
Lishan Tennis Club, Yanji, China
25–27 September 1998
Hard

Indonesia
0

			1	2	3	4	5
1	(China) (Indonesia)	Zhang Yu; Febi Widhiyanto	6; 1	6; 2	4; 6	1; 6	7; 5
2	(China) (Indonesia)	Zheng Yu; Andrian Raturandang	6; 3	6; 2	6; 2
3	(China) (Indonesia)	Li Si / Zheng Yu; Sulistyo Wibowo / Bonit Wiryawan	4; 6	7^{9} 6^{7}	6; 4	6; 3
4	(China) (Indonesia)	Zhang Yu; Andrian Raturandang	3; 6	6; 3	6; 4
5	(China) (Indonesia)	Zheng Yu; Febi Widhiyanto	6; 2	6; 1
