= 1994 Davis Cup World Group qualifying round =

The 1994 Davis Cup World Group qualifying round was held from 23 to 25 September. They were the main play-offs of the 1994 Davis Cup. The winners of the playoffs advanced to the 1995 Davis Cup World Group, and the losers were relegated to their respective Zonal Regions I.

== Teams ==
Bold indicates team had qualified for the 1995 Davis Cup World Group.

From World Group

- **Australia**
- **Austria**
- **Belgium**
- **Denmark**
- Hungary
- India
- Israel
- **Italy**

From Americas Group I

- Uruguay
- Peru

From Asia/Oceania Group I

- Indonesia
- New Zealand

From Europe/Africa Group I

- **Croatia**
- Portugal
- **South Africa**
- **Switzerland**

|}

== Results summary ==
Date: 23–25 September

The eight losing teams in the World Group first round ties and eight winners of the Zonal Group I final round ties competed in the World Group qualifying round for spots in the 1995 World Group.

Home team	Score	Visiting team	Location	Venue	Door	Surface	Ref.
New Zealand	1-4	**Australia**	Christchurch	King Edward Barracks	Indoor	Carpet	
Uruguay	2-3	**Austria**	Montevideo	Carrasco Lawn Tennis Club	Outdoor	Clay	
Israel	2-3	**Belgium**	Ramat HaSharon	Canada Stadium	Outdoor	Hard	
Portugal	0-4	**Croatia**	Porto	Lawn Tennis Club da Foz	Outdoor	Clay	
**Denmark**	4-1	Peru	Copenhagen	Valby-Hallen	Indoor	Carpet	
Hungary	1-4	**Italy**	Budapest	Romai Tennis Academy	Outdoor	Clay	
Indonesia	1-4	**Switzerland**	Jakarta	Gelora Senayan Sports Complex	Outdoor	Hard	
India	2-3	**South Africa**	Jaipur	Jai Club Tennis Complex	Outdoor	Grass	

- Australia, Austria, Belgium, Denmark and Italy remain in the World Group in 1995.
- Croatia, South Africa and Switzerland are promoted to the World Group in 1995.
- Indonesia, New Zealand, Peru, Portugal and Uruguay remain in Zonal Group I in 1995.
- Hungary, India and Israel are relegated to Zonal Group I in 1995.

== Qualifying results ==
=== New Zealand vs. Australia ===
New Zealand
1
King Edward Barracks, Christchurch, New Zealand
23–25 September 1994
Carpet (indoors)

Australia
4

			1	2	3	4	5
1	(New Zealand) (Australia)	**Brett Steven**; Mark Woodforde	**7**; 5	6^{4} **7^{7}**	**6**; 3	**7**; 5
2	(New Zealand) (Australia)	James Greenhalgh; **Pat Rafter**	5; **7**	2; **6**	3; **6**
3	(New Zealand) (Australia)	Kelly Evernden / Brett Steven; **Todd Woodbridge / Mark Woodforde**	3; **6**	4; **6**	1; **6**
4	(New Zealand) (Australia)	Brett Steven; **Pat Rafter**	5; **7**	4; **6**	1; **6**
5	(New Zealand) (Australia)	James Greenhalgh; **Mark Woodforde**	**6**; 3	1; **6**	2; **6**

=== Uruguay vs. Austria ===
Uruguay
2
Carrasco Lawn Tennis Club, Montevideo, Uruguay
23–25 September 1994
Clay

Austria
3

			1	2	3	4	5
1	(Uruguay) (Austria)	Diego Pérez; **Thomas Muster**	3; **6**	2; **6**	3; **6**
2	(Uruguay) (Austria)	Marcelo Filippini; **Gilbert Schaller**	**6**; 4	**7**; 5	0; **6**	0; **6**	3; **6**
3	(Uruguay) (Austria)	**Marcelo Filippini / Diego Pérez**; Alex Antonitsch / Horst Skoff	**7**; 5	**7**; 5	3; **6**	**6**; 3
4	(Uruguay) (Austria)	Marcelo Filippini; **Thomas Muster**	5; **7**	1; **6**	1; **6**
5	(Uruguay) (Austria)	**Diego Pérez**; Gilbert Schaller	6^{7} **7^{9}**	**6**; 4	**7**; 5

=== Israel vs. Belgium ===
Israel
2
Canada Stadium, Ramat HaSharon, Israel
23–25 September 1994
Hard

Belgium
3

			1	2	3	4	5
1	(Israel) (Belgium)	Gilad Bloom; **Filip Dewulf**	4; **6**	3; **6**	3; **6**
2	(Israel) (Belgium)	**Amos Mansdorf**; Christophe Van Garsse	**7**; 5	**6**; 3	**7^{7}** 6^{3}
3	(Israel) (Belgium)	Eyal Erlich / Amos Mansdorf; **Filip Dewulf / Libor Pimek**	4; **6**	**7**; 5	3; **6**	**7^{7}** 6^{4}	4; **6**
4	(Israel) (Belgium)	Amos Mansdorf; **Filip Dewulf**	**6**; 1	4; **6**	**6**; 2	5; **7**	0; 1	**retired**
5	(Israel) (Belgium)	**Gilad Bloom**; Christophe Van Garsse	**6**; 1	1; **6**	**6**; 2

=== Portugal vs. Croatia ===
Portugal
0
Lawn Tennis Club da Foz, Porto, Portugal
23–25 September 1994
Clay

Croatia
4

			1	2	3	4	5
1	(Portugal) (Croatia)	Nuno Marques; **Igor Šarić**	3; **6**	3; **6**	**6**; 3	**6**; 3	4; **6**
2	(Portugal) (Croatia)	Emanuel Couto; **Goran Ivanišević**	2; **6**	**7**; 5	5; 6			**retired**
3	(Portugal) (Croatia)	Nuno Marques / João Cunha e Silva; **Saša Hiršzon / Goran Ivanišević**	4; **6**	2; **6**	4; **6**
4	(Portugal) (Croatia)	Nuno Marques; **Goran Ivanišević**	3; **6**	5; **7**
5	(Portugal) (Croatia)	Emanuel Couto; Igor Šarić	**6**; 1	3; 2				**not** **completed**

=== Denmark vs. Peru ===
Denmark
4
Valby-Hallen, Copenhagen, Denmark
23–25 September 1994
Carpet (indoors)

Peru
1

			1	2	3	4	5
1	(Denmark) (Peru)	Frederik Fetterlein; **Jaime Yzaga**	5; **7**	**6**; 4	6^{3} **7^{7}**	**6**; 3	9; **11**
2	(Denmark) (Peru)	**Kenneth Carlsen**; José Luis Noriega	**6**; 2	**6**; 2	**6**; 4
3	(Denmark) (Peru)	**Kenneth Carlsen / Morten Christensen**; José Luis Noriega / Jaime Yzaga	4; **6**	**6**; 3	6^{7} **7^{9}**	**7^{7}** 6^{5}	**6**; 4
4	(Denmark) (Peru)	**Kenneth Carlsen**; Jaime Yzaga	**6**; 3	6^{4} **7^{7}**	**6**; 3	**6**; 3
5	(Denmark) (Peru)	**Frederik Fetterlein**; José Luis Noriega	**7^{7}** 6^{3}	**6**; 2

=== Hungary vs. Italy ===
Hungary
1
Romai Tennis Academy, Budapest, Hungary
23–25 September 1994
Clay

Italy
4

			1	2	3	4	5
1	(Hungary) (Italy)	József Krocskó; **Andrea Gaudenzi**	2; **6**	**6**; 4	3; **6**	3; **6**
2	(Hungary) (Italy)	Sándor Noszály; **Renzo Furlan**	6^{6} **7^{8}**	2; **6**	**7^{7}** 6^{5}	1; **6**
3	(Hungary) (Italy)	Gábor Köves / László Markovits; **Cristian Brandi / Stefano Pescosolido**	2; **6**	**6**; 4	4; **6**	**7^{7}** 6^{5}	7; **9**
4	(Hungary) (Italy)	Sándor Noszály; **Andrea Gaudenzi**	1; **6**	3; **6**
5	(Hungary) (Italy)	**József Krocskó**; Renzo Furlan	2; **6**	**7**; 5	**6**; 1

=== Indonesia vs. Switzerland ===
Indonesia
1
Gelora Senayan Sports Complex, Jakarta, Indonesia
23–25 September 1994
Hard

Switzerland
4

			1	2	3	4	5
1	(Indonesia) (Switzerland)	Benny Wijaya; **Jakob Hlasek**	6^{3} **7^{7}**	2; **6**	0; **6**
2	(Indonesia) (Switzerland)	Suwandi Suwandi; **Marc Rosset**	4; **6**	3; **6**	1; **6**
3	(Indonesia) (Switzerland)	Donny Susetyo / Bonit Wiryawan; **Jakob Hlasek / Marc Rosset**	3; **6**	6^{5} **7^{7}**	2; **6**
4	(Indonesia) (Switzerland)	**Benny Wijaya**; Patrick Mohr	**6**; 1	**6**; 3
5	(Indonesia) (Switzerland)	Suwandi Suwandi; **Jakob Hlasek**	2; **6**	**6**; 3	3; **6**

=== India vs. South Africa ===
India
2
Jai Club Tennis Complex, Jaipur, India
23–25 September 1994
Grass

South Africa
3

			1	2	3	4	5
1	(India) (South Africa)	**Leander Paes**; Grant Stafford	**6**; 4	**6**; 3	5; 2			**retired**
2	(India) (South Africa)	Asif Ismail; **Wayne Ferreira**	4; **6**	2; **6**	2; **6**
3	(India) (South Africa)	Gaurav Natekar / Leander Paes; **Wayne Ferreira / Piet Norval**	4; **6**	4; **6**	1; **6**
4	(India) (South Africa)	**Leander Paes**; Wayne Ferreira	**6**; 3	**6**; 4	**7**; 5
5	(India) (South Africa)	Asif Ismail; **Marcos Ondruska**	4; **6**	3; **6**	3; **6**
