= Indonesia Davis Cup team =

National tennis team

Indonesia
- Captain: Febi Widhiyanto
- Nations Ranking: 70 0 (24 November 2025)
- Colors: Red & White
- First year: 1961
- Years played: 57
- Ties played (W–L): 121 (53–68)
- Years in World Group: 5 (0–5)
- Best finish: World Group First Round (1983 & 1989)
- Most total wins: Christopher Rungkat (51–19)
- Most singles wins: Christopher Rungkat (26–12)
- Most doubles wins: Christopher Rungkat (25–7)
- Best doubles team: Suwandi and Bonit Wiryawan (6–2); Sulistyo Wibowo and Bonit Wiryawan (6–4)
- Most ties played: Christopher Rungkat (35)
- Most years played: Christopher Rungkat (17)

The Indonesia men's national tennis team represents Indonesia in Davis Cup tennis competition and are governed by the Indonesian Tennis Association.

Indonesia currently compete in Group II of the Asia/Oceania Zone. They played in the World Group in 1983 and 1989.

== History ==
Indonesia competed in its first Davis Cup in 1961. Joseph Valentinus Sie, Liep Tjiauw Tan, Itjas Sumarno, and Sutarjo Sugiarto represented Indonesia in its first Davis Cup in 1961.

== Results ==
=== 1980s ===
Year	Competition	Date	Location	Opponent	Score	Result
1988	Asia/Oceania Zone Group I, 1st Round	5–7 February	Jakarta, Indonesia	Thailand	5–0	Won
1988	Asia/Oceania Zone Group I, 2nd Round	8–10 April	Jakarta, Indonesia	China	4–1	Won
1988	Asia/Oceania Zone Group I, 3rd Round	22–24 July	Jakarta, Indonesia	South Korea	3–2	Won
1989	World Group, 1st Round	3–5 February	Karlsruhe, West Germany	West Germany	0–5	Lost
1989	World Group, qualifying round	21–23 July	Best, Netherlands	Netherlands	0–5	Lost

=== 1990s ===
Year	Competition	Date	Location	Opponent	Score	Result
1990	Group I, Asia/Oceania, 2nd Round	4–6 May	Beijing, China	China	1–4	Lost
1991	Group I, Asia/Oceania, 1st Round	29–31 March	Jaipur, India	India	1–4	Lost
1992	Group I, Asia/Oceania, 1st Round	27–29 March	Manila, Philippines	Philippines	4–1	Won
1992	Group I, Asia/Oceania, 2nd Round	1–3 May	Jakarta, Indonesia	India	0–5	Lost
1993	Group I, Asia/Oceania, 1st Round	26–29 March	Jakarta, Indonesia	Philippines	3–2	Won
1993	Group I, Asia/Oceania, 2nd Round	30 April–2 May	Seoul, South Korea	South Korea	0–5	Lost
1994	Group I, Asia/Oceania, 1st Round	25–27 March	Causeway Bay, Hong Kong	Hong Kong	3–2	Won
1994	Group I, Asia/Oceania, 2nd Round	6–8 May	Jakarta, Indonesia	South Korea	3–2	Won
1994	World Group, qualifying round	23–25 September	Jakarta, Indonesia	Switzerland	1–4	Lost
1995	Group I, Asia/Oceania, 1st Round	3–5 February	Seoul, South Korea	South Korea	0–5	Lost
1995	Group I, Asia/Oceania, 1st Round Play-offs	31 March–2 April	Jakarta, Indonesia	Chinese Taipei	4–1	Won
1996	Group I, Asia/Oceania, 1st Round	9–12 February	Jakarta, Indonesia	South Korea	1–4	Lost
1996	Group I, Asia/Oceania, 1st Round Play-offs	5–7 April	Jakarta, Indonesia	China	0–5	Lost
1996	Group I, Asia/Oceania, 2nd Round Play-offs	20–22 September	Taipei, Chinese Taipei	Chinese Taipei	3–2	Won
1997	Group I, Asia/Oceania, 1st Round	7–9 February	Manila, Philippines	Philippines	3–2	Won
1997	Group I, Asia/Oceania, 2nd Round	4–6 April	Jakarta, Indonesia	New Zealand	0–5	Lost
1998	Group I, Asia/Oceania, 1st Round	13–15 February	Sapporo, Japan	Japan	0–5	Lost
1998	Group I, Asia/Oceania, 1st Round Play-offs	17–19 July	Zouk Mikael, Lebanon	Lebanon	2–3	Lost
1998	Group I, Asia/Oceania, 2nd Round Play-offs	25–27 September	Yanji, China	China	0–5	Lost
1999	Group II, Asia/Oceania, 1st Round	12–14 February	Doha, Qatar	Qatar	5–0	Won
1999	Group II, Asia/Oceania, 2nd Round	2–4 April	Jakarta, Indonesia	Philippines	1–4	Lost

=== 2000s ===
Year	Competition	Date	Location	Opponent	Score	Result
2000	Group II, Asia/Oceania, 1st Round	4–6 February	Manila, Philippines	Philippines	4–1	Won
2000	Group II, Asia/Oceania, 2nd Round	7–9 April	Kuala Lumpur, Malaysia	Malaysia	5–0	Won
2000	Group II, Asia/Oceania, 3rd Round	6–8 October	Jakarta, Indonesia	Chinese Taipei	4–1	Won
2001	Group I, Asia/Oceania, 1st Round	9–11 February	Jakarta, Indonesia	Uzbekistan	2–3	Lost
2001	Group I, Asia/Oceania, 1st Round Play-offs	6–8 April	Seoul, South Korea	South Korea	1–4	Lost
2001	Group I, Asia/Oceania, 2nd Round Play-offs	21–23 September	Surabaya, Indonesia	China	4–1	Won
2002	Group I, Asia/Oceania, 1st Round	8–10 February	Invercargill, New Zealand	New Zealand	2–3	Lost
2002	Group I, Asia/Oceania, 1st Round Play-offs	5–7 April	Surabaya, Indonesia	Lebanon	4–1	Won
2003	Group I, Asia/Oceania, 1st Round	7–9 February	Tashkent, Uzbekistan	Uzbekistan	2–3	Lost
2003	Group I, Asia/Oceania, 1st Round Play-offs	4–6 April	Surabaya, Indonesia	South Korea	3–2	Won
2004	Group I, Asia/Oceania, 1st Round	6–8 February	Jakarta, Indonesia	Japan	2–3	Lost
2004	Group I, Asia/Oceania, 1st Round Play-offs	9–11 April	Jakarta, Indonesia	New Zealand	5–0	Won
2005	Group I, Asia/Oceania, 1st Round	4–6 March	Jakarta, Indonesia	Uzbekistan	2–3	Lost
2005	Group I, Asia/Oceania, 1st Round Play-offs	15–17 July	Tianjin, China	China	1–4	Lost
2005	Group I, Asia/Oceania, 2nd Round Play-offs	13–15 September	Bangkok, Thailand	Thailand	1–4	Lost
2006	Group II, Asia/Oceania, 1st Round	10–12 February	Balikpapan, Indonesia	Malaysia	5–0	Won
2006	Group II, Asia/Oceania, 2nd Round	7–9 April	Surabaya, Indonesia	Hong Kong	5–0	Won
2006	Group II, Asia/Oceania, 3rd Round	22–24 September	Almaty, Kazakhstan	Kazakhstan	2–3	Lost
2007	Group II, Asia/Oceania, 1st Round	9–11 February	Victoria Park, Hong Kong	Hong Kong	3–2	Won
2007	Group II, Asia/Oceania, 2nd Round	6–8 April	Mishref, Kuwait	Kuwait	1–4	Lost
2008	Group II, Asia/Oceania, 1st Round	8–10 February	Jakarta, Indonesia	Hong Kong	3–2	Won
2008	Group II, Asia/Oceania, 2nd Round	11–13 April	Jakarta, Indonesia	China	2–3	Lost
2009	Group II, Asia/Oceania, 1st Round	6–8 March	Surakarta, Indonesia	Kuwait	3–2	Won
2009	Group II, Asia/Oceania, 2nd Round	10–12 July	Hamilton, New Zealand	New Zealand	0–5	Lost

=== 2010s ===
Year	Competition	Date	Location	Opponent	Score	Result
2010	Group II, Asia/Oceania, 1st Round	5–7 March	Kuala Lumpur, Malaysia	Malaysia	5–0	Won
2010	Group II, Asia/Oceania, 2nd Round	9–11 July	Jakarta, Indonesia	Thailand	1–4	Lost
2011	Group II, Asia/Oceania, 1st Round	4–6 March	Tehran, Iran	Iran	3–2	Won
2011	Group II, Asia/Oceania, 2nd Round	8–10 July	Nonthaburi, Thailand	Thailand	1–4	Lost
2012	Group II, Asia/Oceania, 1st Round	10–12 February	Victoria Park, Hong Kong	Hong Kong	3–2	Won
2012	Group II, Asia/Oceania, 2nd Round	6–8 April	Jakarta, Indonesia	Thailand	3–2	Won
2012	Group II, Asia/Oceania, 3rd Round	14–16 September	Pekanbaru, Indonesia	Philippines	3–2	Won
2013	Group I, Asia/Oceania, 1st Round	1–3 February	Tokyo, Japan	Japan	0–5	Lost
2013	Group I, Asia/Oceania, 1st Round Play-offs	5–7 April	Bangalore, India	India	0–5	Lost
2013	Group I, Asia/Oceania, 2nd Round Play-offs	13–15 September	Kaohsiung City, Chinese Taipei	Chinese Taipei	0–5	Lost
2014	Group II, Asia/Oceania, 1st Round	31 January – 2 February	Mishref, Kuwait	Kuwait	2–3	Lost
2014	Group II, Asia/Oceania, Play-offs	4–6 April	Jakarta, Indonesia	Hong Kong	3–1	Won
2015	Group II, Asia/Oceania, 1st Round	6–8 March	Palembang, Indonesia	Iran	5–0	Won
2015	Group II, Asia/Oceania, 2nd Round	17–19 July	Jakarta, Indonesia	Pakistan	1–3	Lost
2016	Group II, Asia/Oceania, 1st Round	4–6 March	Surakarta, Indonesia	Vietnam	2–3	Lost
2016	Group II, Asia/Oceania, Play-offs	15–17 July	Surakarta, Indonesia	Sri Lanka	5–0	Won
2017	Group II, Asia/Oceania, 1st Round	3–5 February	Manila, Philippines	Philippines	1–4	Lost
2017	Group II, Asia/Oceania, Play-offs	7–9 April	Surakarta, Indonesia	Kuwait	4–1	Won
2018	Group II, Asia/Oceania, 1st Round	3–4 February	Jakarta, Indonesia	Philippines	1–4	Lost
2018	Group II, Asia/Oceania, Play-offs	7–8 April	Colombo, Sri Lanka	Sri Lanka	3–1	Won
2019	Group II, Asia/Oceania	14–15 September	Jakarta, Indonesia	New Zealand	1–3	Lost

=== 2020s ===
Year	Competition	Date	Location	Opponent	Score	Result
2020–21	World Group II, Play-offs	6–7 March 2020	Jakarta, Indonesia	Kenya	4–0	Won
2020–21	World Group II	17–18 September 2021	Saint Michael, Barbados	Barbados	1–3	Lost
2022	World Group II, Play-offs	4–5 March	Jakarta, Indonesia	Venezuela	3–0	Won
2022	World Group II	16–17 September	Inowrocław, Poland	Poland	0–5	Lost
2023	World Group II, Play-offs	4–5 February	Từ Sơn, Vietnam	Vietnam	3–2	Won
2023	World Group II	15–17 September	Islamabad, Pakistan	Pakistan	0–5	Lost
2024	World Group II, Play-offs	2–4 February	Lomé, Togo	Togo	2–3	Lost
2024	Group III, Asia/Oceania, Round robin	10 June	Amman, Jordan	Malaysia	3–0	Won
2024	Group III, Asia/Oceania, Round robin	11 June	Amman, Jordan	Singapore	1–2	Lost
2024	Group III, Asia/Oceania, Round robin	12 June	Amman, Jordan	Vietnam	1–2	Lost
2024	Group III, Asia/Oceania, Round robin	13 June	Amman, Jordan	Saudi Arabia	1–2	Lost
2024	Group III, Asia/Oceania, Seventh place play-off	15 June	Amman, Jordan	Iran	2–1	Won
2025	World Group II, Play-offs	1–2 February	Velenje, Slovenia	Slovenia	0–4	Lost
2025	Group III, Asia/Oceania, Round robin	14 July	Bắc Ninh, Vietnam	Cambodia	3–0	Won
2025	Group III, Asia/Oceania, Round robin	15 July	Bắc Ninh, Vietnam	Sri Lanka	3–0	Won
2025	Group III, Asia/Oceania, Round robin	17 July	Bắc Ninh, Vietnam	Jordan	2–1	Won
2025	Group III, Asia/Oceania, Round robin	18 July	Bắc Ninh, Vietnam	Syria	2–1	Won
2025	Group III, Asia/Oceania, First place play-off	19 July	Bắc Ninh, Vietnam	Thailand	0–2	Lost
2026	World Group II, Play-offs	6–8 February	Jakarta, Indonesia	Togo	4–0	Won
2026	World Group II	18–20 September	Jakarta, Indonesia	Romania	TBD	TBD

== See also ==
- Davis Cup
- Indonesia Billie Jean King Cup team
