= 2014 Davis Cup Asia/Oceania Zone Group II =

International tennis competition

The Asia/Oceania Zone is one of the three zones of regional Davis Cup competition in 2014.

In the Asia/Oceania Zone there are four different groups in which teams compete against each other to advance to the next group.

== Participating nations ==
Seeds:

1. Philippines
2. Indonesia
3. Thailand
4. Pakistan

Remaining nations:

- Hong Kong
- Kuwait
- Sri Lanka
- Vietnam

=== Draw ===
Play-offs
Da Lat, Vietnam (hard)
Sri Lanka	3
Vietnam	2
Jakarta, Indonesia (hard)
Hong Kong	1
2	Indonesia	3

First Round
Colombo, Sri Lanka (hard)
1	Philippines	3
Sri Lanka	1
Da Lat, Vietnam (hard)
4	Pakistan	3
Vietnam	2
Phuket, Thailand (hard, indoor)
Hong Kong	1
3	Thailand	4
Mishref, Kuwait (hard)
Kuwait	3
2	Indonesia	2

Second Round
Manila, Philippines (clay)
1	Philippines	2
4	Pakistan	3
Nonthaburi, Thailand (hard)
3	Thailand	4
Kuwait	1

Third Round
Nonthaburi, Thailand (hard)
4	Pakistan	1
3	Thailand	4

- Vietnam and Hong Kong relegated to Group III in 2015.
- Thailand promoted to Group I in 2015.

== First round ==
=== Sri Lanka vs. Philippines ===
Sri Lanka
1
Sri Lanka Tennis Association Courts, Colombo, Sri Lanka
31 January – 2 February 2014
Hard

Philippines
3

			1	2	3	4	5
1	(Sri Lanka) (Philippines)	Harshana Godamanna; Patrick-John Tierro	6; 3	6^{8} 7^{10}	4; 6	6; 2	6; 3
2	(Sri Lanka) (Philippines)	Dineshkanthan Thangarajah; Ruben Gonzales	3; 6	3; 6	0; 6
3	(Sri Lanka) (Philippines)	Harshana Godamanna / Rajeev Rajapakse; Johnny Arcilla / Treat Huey	1; 6	0; 6	1; 6
4	(Sri Lanka) (Philippines)	Harshana Godamanna; Treat Huey	6; 2	4; 6	4; 6	4; 6
5	(Sri Lanka) (Philippines)	Dineshkanthan Thangarajah; Patrick-John Tierro						not played

=== Vietnam vs. Pakistan ===
Vietnam
2
The 198 Tennis Club, Da Lat City, Vietnam
14 – 16 February 2014
Hard

Pakistan
3

			1	2	3	4	5
1	(Vietnam) (Pakistan)	Ngô Quang Huy; Aqeel Khan	0; 6	4; 6	3; 6
2	(Vietnam) (Pakistan)	Nguyễn Hoàng Thiên; Muhammad Abid	6; 3	6; 2	6; 0
3	(Vietnam) (Pakistan)	Lê Quốc Khánh / Ngô Quang Huy; Aqeel Khan / Aisam-ul-Haq Qureshi	1; 6	1; 6	7^{7} 6^{5}	2; 6
4	(Vietnam) (Pakistan)	Nguyễn Hoàng Thiên; Aqeel Khan	2; 6	4; 6	2; 6
5	(Vietnam) (Pakistan)	Trịnh Linh Giang; Yasir Khan	7^{7} 6^{4}	6; 2

=== Thailand vs. Hong Kong ===
Thailand
4
Thanyapura Sports & Leisure Club, Phuket, Thailand
14 – 16 February 2014
Hard (i)

Hong Kong
1

			1	2	3	4	5
1	(Thailand) (Hong Kong)	Warit Sornbutnark; Phillip King	2; 6	6^{2} 7^{7}	3; 6
2	(Thailand) (Hong Kong)	Wishaya Trongcharoenchaikul; Ognian Kolev	6; 4	7; 5	7; 5
3	(Thailand) (Hong Kong)	Pruchya Isaro / Nuttanon Kadchapanan; Phillip King / Wong Chun Hun	6; 4	6; 2	6; 2
4	(Thailand) (Hong Kong)	Pruchya Isaro; Phillip King	6; 4	6; 1	6; 2
5	(Thailand) (Hong Kong)	Nuttanon Kadchapanan; Ognian Kolev	6; 1	2; 6	6; 2

=== Kuwait vs. Indonesia ===
Kuwait
3
Kuwait Tennis Federation Center, Mishref, Kuwait
31 January – 2 February 2014
Hard

Indonesia
2

			1	2	3	4	5
1	(Kuwait) (Indonesia)	Mohammad Ghareeb; David Agung Susanto	6; 3	6; 3	7^{7} 6^{2}
2	(Kuwait) (Indonesia)	Abdullah Maqdes; Elbert Sie	6; 3	6; 4	4; 6	6; 0
3	(Kuwait) (Indonesia)	Mohammad Ghareeb / Abdullah Maqdes; Elbert Sie / David Agung Susanto	6^{2} 7^{7}	1; 6	2; 6
4	(Kuwait) (Indonesia)	Abdullah Maqdes; David Agung Susanto	6; 4	6; 4	6; 1
5	(Kuwait) (Indonesia)	Abdulhameed Alshatti; Aditya Hari Sasongko	2; 6	1; 6

== Second round ==
=== Philippines vs. Pakistan ===
Philippines
2
Philippine Columbian Association, Manila, Philippines
4 – 6 April 2014
Clay (indoor)

Pakistan
3

			1	2	3	4	5
1	(Philippines) (Pakistan)	Patrick-John Tierro; Aqeel Khan	7; 5	6; 4	6; 4
2	(Philippines) (Pakistan)	Ruben Gonzales; Samir Iftikhar	6; 4	6; 3	6; 1
3	(Philippines) (Pakistan)	John Arcilla / Treat Huay; Aqeel Khan / Aisam-ul-Haq Qureshi	5; 7	3; 6	2; 6
4	(Philippines) (Pakistan)	John Arcilla; Aqeel Khan	6; 4	1; 6	6; 2	3; 6	1; 5	retired
5	(Philippines) (Pakistan)	Patrick-John Tierro; Aisam-ul-Haq Qureshi	2; 6	3; 6	6; 3	4; 6

=== Thailand vs. Kuwait ===
Thailand
4
The National Tennis Development Centre, Nonthaburi, Thailand
4 – 6 April 2014
Hard

Kuwait
1

			1	2	3	4	5
1	(Thailand) (Kuwait)	Pruchya Isaro; Abdulhameed Alshatti	6; 0	6; 0	6; 0
2	(Thailand) (Kuwait)	Wishaya Trongcharoenchaikul; Mohammad Al-Ghareeb	6; 3	6^{6} 7^{8}	6^{4} 7^{7}	6; 3	5; 7
3	(Thailand) (Kuwait)	Pruchya Isaro / Nuttanon Kadchapanan; Hassan Al Mousa / Mohammad Al-Ghareeb	7^{7} 6^{2}	7; 5	6; 3
4	(Thailand) (Kuwait)	Pruchya Isaro; Mohammad Al-Ghareeb	6; 2	7^{14} 6^{12}	1; 6	6; 1
5	(Thailand) (Kuwait)	Warit Sornbutnark; Ali Ghareeb	6; 3	6; 4

== Play-off ==
=== Vietnam vs. Sri Lanka ===
Vietnam
2
The 198 Tennis Club, Da Lat City, Vietnam
4 – 6 April 2014
Hard

Sri Lanka
3

			1	2	3	4	5
1	(Vietnam) (Sri Lanka)	Đỗ Minh Quân; Sharmal Dissanayake	6; 3	6; 4	6; 4
2	(Vietnam) (Sri Lanka)	Nguyễn Hoàng Thiên; Harshana Godamanna	2; 6	3; 6	2; 6
3	(Vietnam) (Sri Lanka)	Đỗ Minh Quân / Lê Quốc Khánh; Sharmal Dissanayake / Harshana Godamanna	4; 6	5; 7	3; 6
4	(Vietnam) (Sri Lanka)	Nguyễn Hoàng Thiên; Sharmal Dissanayake	6; 2	6; 3	6; 4
5	(Vietnam) (Sri Lanka)	Đỗ Minh Quân; Harshana Godamanna	3; 6	5; 7	0; 6

=== Hong Kong vs. Indonesia ===
Hong Kong
1
Gelora Bung Karno Tennis Stadium, Jakarta, Indonesia
25 – 27 April 2014
Hard

Indonesia
3

			1	2	3	4	5
1	(Hong Kong) (Indonesia)	Ognian Kolev; Christopher Rungkat	6^{1} 7^{7}	4; 6	4; 6
2	(Hong Kong) (Indonesia)	Phillip King; David Agung Susanto	6; 2	2; 6	7^{7} 6^{5}	6; 1
3	(Hong Kong) (Indonesia)	Phillip King / Ognian Kolev; Christopher Rungkat / Elbert Sie	4; 6	1; 6	7; 5	6; 3	3; 6
4	(Hong Kong) (Indonesia)	Phillip King; Christopher Rungkat	6; 1	3; 6	4; 6	6; 4	3; 6
5	(Hong Kong) (Indonesia)	David Catala-Velasco; David Agung Susanto	1; 6	1; 4				not played

== Third round ==
=== Thailand vs. Pakistan ===
Thailand
4
The National Tennis Development Centre, Nonthaburi, Thailand
12 - 14 September 2014
Hard

Pakistan
1

			1	2	3	4	5
1	(Thailand) (Pakistan)	Pruchya Isaro; Aisam-ul-Haq Qureshi	3; 6	6; 3	6; 3	6; 2
2	(Thailand) (Pakistan)	Danai Udomchoke; Samir Iftikhar	6; 0	6; 4	6; 1
3	(Thailand) (Pakistan)	Sanchai Ratiwatana / Sonchat Ratiwatana; Aisam-ul-Haq Qureshi / Aqeel Khan	7; 5	6; 2	6; 2
4	(Thailand) (Pakistan)	Danai Udomchoke; Muhammad Abid	6; 0	6; 1
5	(Thailand) (Pakistan)	Pruchya Isaro; Samir Iftikhar	4; 6	6; 3	1; 1			retired
