= 2010 Davis Cup Asia/Oceania Zone Group II =

International tennis competition

The Asia/Oceania Zone is one of the three zones of regional Davis Cup competition in 2010.

In the Asia/Oceania Zone there are four different groups in which teams compete against each other to advance to the next group.

== Participating teams ==
=== Seeds ===
1. Thailand
2. New Zealand
3. Indonesia
4. Pakistan

=== Remaining Nations ===
- Hong Kong
- Sri Lanka
- Pacific Oceania
- Malaysia

== Draw ==
Play-offs
Malaysia
Pacific Oceania	3
Malaysia	2
Hong Kong	3
Sri Lanka	2

First round
Nonthaburi, Thailand (hard)
1	Thailand	5
Pacific Oceania	0
Kuala Lumpur, Malaysia (indoor hard)
3	Indonesia	5
Malaysia	0
Hong Kong, Hong Kong (hard)
Hong Kong	1
4	Pakistan	3
Colombo, Sri Lanka (clay)
Sri Lanka	2
2	New Zealand	3

Second round
Indonesia
1	Thailand	4
3	Indonesia	1
4	Pakistan	2
2	New Zealand	3

Third round
1	Thailand	2
2	New Zealand	3

- Malaysia and Sri Lanka relegated to Group III in 2011.
- New Zealand promoted to Group I in 2011.

== First Round Matches ==
=== Thailand vs. Pacific Oceania ===
Thailand
5
National Tennis Development Centre, Nonthaburi, Thailand
5–7 March 2010
Hard

Pacific Oceania
0

			1	2	3	4	5
1	(Thailand) (Pacific Oceania)	Perakiat Siriluethaiwattana; Michael Leong	7; 5	6; 1	6; 3
2	(Thailand) (Pacific Oceania)	Kittipong Wachiramanowong; Cyril Jacobe	6; 4	6; 1	6; 0
3	(Thailand) (Pacific Oceania)	Sanchai Ratiwatana / Sonchat Ratiwatana; Brett Baudinet / Cyril Jacobe	6; 4	6; 1	6; 3
4	(Thailand) (Pacific Oceania)	Kittipong Wachiramanowong; Michael Leong	6; 2	6; 1
5	(Thailand) (Pacific Oceania)	Perakiat Siriluethaiwattana; Cyril Jacobe	7; 5	6; 2

=== Indonesia vs. Malaysia ===
Indonesia
5
National Tennis Centre, Kuala Lumpur, Malaysia
5–7 March 2010
Hard (indoors)

Malaysia
0

			1	2	3	4	5
1	(Indonesia) (Malaysia)	Christopher Rungkat; Ariez Elyaas Deen Heshaam	6; 0	6; 1	6; 2
2	(Indonesia) (Malaysia)	Sunu-Wahyu Trijati; Si Yew Ming	4; 6	7^{7} 6^{5}	6; 2	6; 2
3	(Indonesia) (Malaysia)	Nesa Arta / Christopher Rungkat; Adam Jaya / Si Yew Ming	6; 2	6; 3	3; 6	7^{8} 6^{6}
4	(Indonesia) (Malaysia)	David Agung Susanto; Mohd Assri Merzuki	6; 3	6; 3
5	(Indonesia) (Malaysia)	Sunu-Wahyu Trijati; Ariez Elyaas Deen Heshaam	6; 4	6; 3

=== Hong Kong vs. Pakistan ===
Hong Kong
1
Victoria Park, Hong Kong
5–7 March 2010

Pakistan
3

			1	2	3	4	5
1	(Hong Kong) (Pakistan)	Yu Hiu Tung; Aqeel Khan	6; 4	6; 2	3; 6	3; 6	6; 3
2	(Hong Kong) (Pakistan)	Hui Cheuk Wai; Aisam-ul-Haq Qureshi	2; 6	3; 6	4; 6
3	(Hong Kong) (Pakistan)	Hui Cheuk Wai / Yu Hiu Tung; Aqeel Khan / Aisam-ul-Haq Qureshi	6; 2	3; 6	4; 6	4; 6
4	(Hong Kong) (Pakistan)	Yu Hiu Tung; Aisam-ul-Haq Qureshi	3; 6	4; 6	4; 6
5	(Hong Kong) (Pakistan)	Siu-Fai Kelvin Lam; Yasir Khan

=== Sri Lanka vs. New Zealand ===
Sri Lanka
2
Sri Lanka Tennis Association, Colombo, Sri Lanka
5–7 March 2010
Clay

New Zealand
3

			1	2	3	4	5
1	(Sri Lanka) (New Zealand)	Harshana Godamanna; Jose Statham	4; 6	6; 3	6; 4	3; 6	4; 6
2	(Sri Lanka) (New Zealand)	Rajeev Rajapakse; Daniel King-Turner	2; 6	6; 3	1; 6	2; 6
3	(Sri Lanka) (New Zealand)	Harshana Godamanna / Rajeev Rajapakse; Marcus Daniell / Daniel King-Turner	7^{7} 6^{5}	6; 4	6; 3
4	(Sri Lanka) (New Zealand)	Harshana Godamanna; Daniel King-Turner	4; 6	4; 6	7; 5	7^{7} 6^{4}	3; 0
5	(Sri Lanka) (New Zealand)	Rajeev Rajapakse; Jose Statham	1; 6	0; 6	5; 7

== Second Round Matches ==
=== Indonesia vs. Thailand ===
Indonesia
1
Gelora Bung Karno Tennis Stadium, Jakarta, Indonesia
9 – 11 July
Hard (outdoors)

Thailand
4

			1	2	3	4	5
1	(Indonesia) (Thailand)	Sunu-Wahyu Trijati; Kittipong Wachiramanowong	6; 3	5; 7	4; 6	7; 5	2; 6
2	(Indonesia) (Thailand)	Christopher Rungkat; Weerapat Doakmaiklee	6; 4	6; 2	6; 0
3	(Indonesia) (Thailand)	Nesa Arta / Christopher Rungkat; Sanchai Ratiwatana / Sonchat Ratiwatana	7^{7} 6^{2}	4; 6	4; 6	3; 6
4	(Indonesia) (Thailand)	Christopher Rungkat; Kittipong Wachiramanowong	6; 4	2; 6	4; 6	4; 6
5	(Indonesia) (Thailand)	David Agung Susanto; Weerapat Doakmaiklee	3; 6	4; 6

=== New Zealand vs. Pakistan ===
New Zealand
3
TSB Hub, Hawera, Taranaki, New Zealand
9 – 11 July
Hard (indoors)

Pakistan
2

			1	2	3	4	5
1	(New Zealand) (Pakistan)	Jose Statham; Aqeel Khan	6; 4	6; 0	6; 0
2	(New Zealand) (Pakistan)	Michael Venus; Aisam-ul-Haq Qureshi	6^{2} 7^{7}	6; 4	2; 6	6; 2	13; 15
3	(New Zealand) (Pakistan)	Marcus Daniell / Michael Venus; Aqeel Khan / Aisam-ul-Haq Qureshi	6^{6} 7^{8}	3; 6	2; 6
4	(New Zealand) (Pakistan)	Jose Statham; Aisam-ul-Haq Qureshi	6; 2	6; 1	6; 3
5	(New Zealand) (Pakistan)	Austen Childs; Aqeel Khan	6; 1	6; 3	6; 3

== Play-Offs Matches ==
=== Malaysia vs. Pacific Oceania ===
Malaysia
2
Kompleks Tenis Tun Abd Razak, National Tennis Centre, Kuala Lumpur, Malaysia
9 – 11 July
Hard (indoors)

Pacific Oceania
3

			1	2	3	4	5
1	(Malaysia) (Pacific Oceania)	Si Yew Ming; Juan Sebastien Langton	4; 6	6; 2	3; 6	7; 5	7; 5
2	(Malaysia) (Pacific Oceania)	Abd-Hazli Bin Zainuddin; Michael Leong	1; 6	1; 6	0; 6
3	(Malaysia) (Pacific Oceania)	Adam Jaya / Si Yew Ming; Michael Leong / Cyril Jacobe	6^{4} 7^{7}	6^{8} 7^{10}	6^{2} 7^{7}
4	(Malaysia) (Pacific Oceania)	Ariez Elyaas Deen Heshaam; Michael Leong	1; 6	0; 6	1; 6
5	(Malaysia) (Pacific Oceania)	Abd-Hazli Bin Zainuddin; Cyril Jacobe	7; 5	7^{7} 6^{2}

=== Sri Lanka vs. Hong Kong ===
Sri Lanka
2
Sri Lanka Tennis Association, Colombo, Sri Lanka
9 – 11 July
Clay (outdoors)

Hong Kong
3

			1	2	3	4	5
1	(Sri Lanka) (Hong Kong)	Harshana Godamanna; Yu Hiu-Tung	6; 3	6; 3	2; 0
2	(Sri Lanka) (Hong Kong)	Dineshkanthan Thangarajah; Martin Sayer	3; 6	2; 6	0; 6
3	(Sri Lanka) (Hong Kong)	Harshana Godamanna / Rajeev Rajapakse; Martin Sayer / Yu Hiu-Tung	4; 6	4; 6	0; 6
4	(Sri Lanka) (Hong Kong)	Harshana Godamanna; Martin Sayer	4; 6	6; 3	3; 6	4; 6
5	(Sri Lanka) (Hong Kong)	Dineshkanthan Thangarajah; Gilbert Wong	6; 3	6; 2

== Third round ==
=== Thailand vs. New Zealand ===
Thailand
2
National Tennis Development Centre, Nonthaburi, Thailand
17–19 September 2010
Hard

New Zealand
3

			1	2	3	4	5
1	(Thailand) (New Zealand)	Weerapat Doakmaiklee; Michael Venus	3; 6	2; 6	6^{1} 7^{7}
2	(Thailand) (New Zealand)	Kittipong Wachiramanowong; Jose Statham	6; 4	6^{5} 7^{7}	1; 6	6^{2} 7^{7}
3	(Thailand) (New Zealand)	Sanchai Ratiwatana / Sonchat Ratiwatana; Daniel King-Turner / Michael Venus	0; 6	6^{6} 7^{8}	6; 0	6; 3	6; 4
4	(Thailand) (New Zealand)	Kittipong Wachiramanowong; Michael Venus	7; 5	7^{8} 6^{6}	6; 2
5	(Thailand) (New Zealand)	Sanchai Ratiwatana; Jose Statham	1; 6	4; 6	3; 6
