= 2012 Davis Cup Asia/Oceania Zone Group II =

International tennis competition

The Asia/Oceania Zone is one of the three zones of regional Davis Cup competition in 2012.

In the Asia/Oceania Zone there are four different groups in which teams compete against each other to advance to the next group.

== Participating nations ==
Seeds:

1. Philippines
2. Thailand (second round)
3. Indonesia
4. Pakistan (second round)

Remaining Nations:

- Hong Kong
- Lebanon
- Pacific Oceania
- Sri Lanka

== Draw ==
Play-offs
Jounieh, Lebanon (clay)
Pacific Oceania	1
Lebanon	4
Hong Kong (hard)
Hong Kong	2
Sri Lanka	3

First Round
Camarines Sur, Philippines (indoor hard)
1	Philippines	5
Pacific Oceania	0
Jounieh, Lebanon (clay)
4	Pakistan	3
Lebanon	2
Hong Kong (hard)
Hong Kong	2
3	Indonesia	3
Colombo, Sri Lanka (clay)
Sri Lanka	2
2	Thailand	3

Second Round
Manila, Philippines (indoor clay)
1	Philippines	5
4	Pakistan	0
Jakarta, Indonesia (hard)
3	Indonesia	3
2	Thailand	2

Third Round
Pekanbaru, Indonesia (hard)
1	Philippines	2
3	Indonesia	3

- Pacific Oceania and Hong Kong relegated to Group III in 2013.
- Indonesia promoted to Group I in 2013.

== First round ==
=== Philippines vs. Pacific Oceania ===
Philippines
5
University of Saint Anthony, Camarines Sur, Philippines
10–12 February 2012
hard (indoor)

Pacific Oceania
0

			1	2	3	4	5
1	(Philippines) (Pacific Oceania)	Jeson Patrombon; Cyril Jacobe	6; 3	6; 2	7^{7} 6^{5}
2	(Philippines) (Pacific Oceania)	Treat Conrad Huey; Michael Leong	6; 0	6; 3	6; 2
3	(Philippines) (Pacific Oceania)	Johnny Arcilla / Ruben Gonzales; Cyril Jacobe / Daniel Llarenas	6^{3} 7^{7}	7; 5	7^{7} 6^{3}	7^{7} 6^{4}
4	(Philippines) (Pacific Oceania)	Jeson Patrombon; Aymeric Mara	6; 0	6; 1
5	(Philippines) (Pacific Oceania)	Johnny Arcilla; Cyril Jacobe	6; 2	6; 1

=== Lebanon vs. Pakistan ===
Lebanon
2
ATCL Club, Jounieh, Lebanon
10–12 February 2012
clay

Pakistan
3

			1	2	3	4	5
1	(Lebanon) (Pakistan)	Karim Alayli; Aisam-ul-Haq Qureshi	0; 6	3; 6	4; 6
2	(Lebanon) (Pakistan)	Bassam Beidas; Aqeel Khan	6; 1	6; 3	6; 2
3	(Lebanon) (Pakistan)	Bassam Beidas / Patrick Chucri; Aqeel Khan / Aisam-ul-Haq Qureshi	2; 6	6; 2	4; 6	6^{5} 7^{7}
4	(Lebanon) (Pakistan)	Bassam Beidas; Aisam-ul-Haq Qureshi	6; 2	6; 1	6; 4
5	(Lebanon) (Pakistan)	Karim Alayli; Aqeel Khan	6^{4} 7^{7}	4; 6	1; 6

=== Hong Kong vs. Indonesia ===
Hong Kong
2
Victoria Park, Hong Kong
10–12 February 2012
hard

Indonesia
3

			1	2	3	4	5
1	(Hong Kong) (Indonesia)	Nicholas Sayer; Christopher Rungkat	4; 6	3; 6	4; 6
2	(Hong Kong) (Indonesia)	Jonathan Chu; David Agung Susanto	6; 3	6; 0	6; 4
3	(Hong Kong) (Indonesia)	Jonathan Chu / Cheuk-Wai Hui; Christopher Rungkat / Aditya Hari Sasongko	2; 6	2; 6	2; 6
4	(Hong Kong) (Indonesia)	Hiu-Tung Yu; Christopher Rungkat	3; 6	6^{7} 7^{9}	2; 6
5	(Hong Kong) (Indonesia)	Nicholas Sayer; Aditya Hari Sasongko	6; 2	6; 3

=== Sri Lanka vs. Thailand ===
Sri Lanka
2
Sri Lanka Tennis Association Courts, Colombo, Sri Lanka
10–12 February 2012
clay

Thailand
3

			1	2	3	4	5
1	(Sri Lanka) (Thailand)	Dineshkanthan Thangarajah; Kittiphong Wachiramanowong	4; 6	5; 7	4; 6
2	(Sri Lanka) (Thailand)	Vimuktha De Alwis; Danai Udomchoke	1; 6	1; 6	2; 6
3	(Sri Lanka) (Thailand)	Amresh Jayawickrema / Dineshkanthan Thangarajah; Weerapat Doakmaiklee / Sanchai Ratiwana	0; 6	4; 6	2; 6
4	(Sri Lanka) (Thailand)	Dineshkanthan Thangarajah; Weerapat Doakmaiklee	6; 4	0; 1				retired
5	(Sri Lanka) (Thailand)	Vimuktha De Alwis; Kittiphong Wachiramanowong

== Second round ==
=== Philippines vs. Pakistan ===
Philippines
5
Philippine Columbian Association, Manila, Philippines
6–8 April 2012
clay (indoor)

Pakistan
0

			1	2	3	4	5
1	(Philippines) (Pakistan)	Johnny Arcilla; Aqeel Khan	6; 2	6; 2	6; 3
2	(Philippines) (Pakistan)	Treat Conrad Huey; Jalil Khan	6; 1	6; 0	6; 3
3	(Philippines) (Pakistan)	Ruben Gonzales / Treat Conrad Huey; Aqeel Khan / Jalil Khan	6; 1	6; 4	6; 2
4	(Philippines) (Pakistan)	Francis Casey Alcantara; Muhammad Abid	6; 2	6; 1
5	(Philippines) (Pakistan)	Johnny Arcilla; Jalil Khan	6; 3	6; 4

=== Indonesia vs. Thailand ===
Indonesia
3
Gelora Bung Karno Stadium, Jakarta, Indonesia
6–8 April 2012
hard (outdoor)

Thailand
2

			1	2	3	4	5
1	(Indonesia) (Thailand)	Christopher Rungkat; Kittipong Wachiramanowong	6; 4	6; 3	6; 2
2	(Indonesia) (Thailand)	Aditya Sasongko; Danai Udomchoke	1; 6	1; 6	3; 6
3	(Indonesia) (Thailand)	Christopher Rungkat / David Agung Susanto; Sanchai Ratiwatana / Sonchat Ratiwatana	6^{6} 7^{8}	3; 6	1; 6
4	(Indonesia) (Thailand)	Christopher Rungkat; Danai Udomchoke	6; 3	6; 2	0; 6	4; 6	6; 1
5	(Indonesia) (Thailand)	Wisnu Adi Nugroho; Kittipong Wachiramanowong	7^{8} 6^{6}	6; 4	6; 2

== Play-offs ==
=== Lebanon vs. Pacific Oceania ===
Lebanon
4
ATCL Club, Jounieh, Lebanon
6–8 April 2012
clay (outdoor)

Pacific Oceania
1

			1	2	3	4	5
1	(Lebanon) (Pacific Oceania)	Bassam Beidas; Cyril Jacobe	6; 2	6; 2	6; 2
2	(Lebanon) (Pacific Oceania)	Karim Alayli; Juan-Sebastian Langton	6; 0	4; 6	6; 1	7; 5
3	(Lebanon) (Pacific Oceania)	Bassam Beidas / Patrick Chucri; Cyril Jacobe / Daniel Llarenas	7; 5	6; 4	6; 1
4	(Lebanon) (Pacific Oceania)	Patrick Chucri; Juan-Sebastian Langton	7; 5	6; 2
5	(Lebanon) (Pacific Oceania)	Rami Osman; Daniel Llarenas	3; 6	6; 4	4; 6

=== Hong Kong vs. Sri Lanka ===
Hong Kong
1
Victoria Park, Causeway Bay, Hong Kong
6–8 April 2012
hard (outdoor)

Sri Lanka
4

			1	2	3	4	5
1	(Hong Kong) (Sri Lanka)	Yu Hiu Tung; Harshana Godamanna	3; 6	7^{7} 6^{5}	1; 6	2; 6
2	(Hong Kong) (Sri Lanka)	Jonathan Chu; Dineshkanthan Thangarajah	7^{7} 6^{2}	6; 2	2; 6	6; 2
3	(Hong Kong) (Sri Lanka)	Jonathan Chu / Yu Hiu Tung; Harshana Godamanna / Rajeev Rajapakse	3; 6	3; 6	7^{7} 6^{4}	6; 2	5; 7
4	(Hong Kong) (Sri Lanka)	Jonathan Chu; Harshana Godamanna	6^{11} 7^{13}	7; 5	0; 6	7; 5	3; 6
5	(Hong Kong) (Sri Lanka)	Kevin Kung; Dineshkanthan Thangarajah	5; 7	3; 6

== Third round ==
=== Philippines vs. Indonesia ===
Philippines
2
PTPN V Tennis Court, Pekanbaru, Indonesia
14–16 September 2012
hard (outdoor)

Indonesia
3

			1	2	3	4	5
1	(Philippines) (Indonesia)	Francis Casey Alcantara; Christopher Rungkat	6^{3} 7^{7}	2; 6	6; 3	0; 6
2	(Philippines) (Indonesia)	Treat Conrad Huey; Elbert Sie	6; 4	6; 2	6; 3
3	(Philippines) (Indonesia)	Ruben Gonzales / Jeson Patrombon; Christopher Rungkat / Elbert Sie	6; 4	3; 6	6^{5} 7^{7}	2; 6
4	(Philippines) (Indonesia)	Jeson Patrombon; Christopher Rungkat	3; 6	2; 6	0; 6
5	(Philippines) (Indonesia)	Francis Casey Alcantara; Sunu-Wahyu Trijati	6; 3	6^{4} 7^{7}	6; 4
