= Phillip King (tennis) =

Taiwanese-American tennis player (born 1981)

- Country (sports): United States
- Residence: Long Beach, California, United States
- Born: December 19, 1981 (age 43) Taipei, Taiwan
- Height: 1.75 m (5 ft 9 in)
- Turned pro: May 9, 2004
- Plays: Right-handed (two-handed backhand)
- Coach: Eliot Teltscher

Singles
- Career record: 1–10

Grand Slam singles results
- US Open: 1R (1999, 2000)
- Career record: 0–4

Team competitions
- Davis Cup: 10–7

Phillip King (Chinese: 金久義, born December 19, 1981, in Taipei, Taiwan) is a former professional tennis player from the United States. In later years he also played tennis in Hong Kong.

== Personal life ==
King's parents David and Karen King emigrated to the U.S. from Taiwan in 1982. King is the oldest of four children. Two of his younger sisters are tennis players; the youngest one Vania King was the 2010 Wimbledon ladies doubles champion and 2010 US Open tennis doubles champion.

== Tennis career ==
King started playing tennis when he was a boy. He was coached by his father David King who was a professional tennis player in Taiwan with several national championships, being known for his powerful forehand compared to his Taiwanese peers. David King was later credited with teaching his son his winning forehand shot. Phillip King won the USTA Junior National Championships in 1999 and 2000. He was two-time All-American in 2000-01 and 2001-02 while he attended Duke University, North Carolina.

On May 9, 2004, he turned professional, and was coached by Eliot Teltscher who also coached Pete Sampras. King has played in US Open, ATP World Tour and other major tournaments.

In later years after a break in professional tennis, King joined Hong Kong Davis Cup team 2013–15, being the captain in 2015. He was also the non-playing captain for Hong Kong team in Fed Cup 2014 and 2015.

== Coaching career ==
King was appointed head coach for Hong Kong tennis team competing in 2013 East Asian Games hosted by Tianjin, China.
