= Kim Chi-wan =

South Korean tennis player (born 1968)

- Full name: Kim Chi-wan
- Country (sports): South Korea
- Born: 1 October 1968 (age 56); Ulsan, South Korea
- Height: 5 ft 11 in (180 cm)
- Prize money: $11,195

Singles
- Career record: 1-2
- Highest ranking: No. 422 (15 June 1992)

Doubles
- Career record: 4-5
- Highest ranking: No. 301 (16 August 1993)

Kim Chi-wan (born 1 October 1968) is a former professional tennis player from South Korea.

== Biography ==
Born in Ulsan, Kim is the youngest of three siblings and started playing tennis while in elementary school.

He featured in a total of eight Davis Cup ties for South Korea, mostly as a doubles player.

His regular doubles partner was Chang Eui-jong and the pair played together at the 1992 Summer Olympics in Barcelona, where they lost their first round match in five sets to Indonesia's Hary Suharyadi and Bonit Wiryawan.

All of his ATP Tour main draw appearances came at his local tournament, the Korea Open in Seoul. Most notably he had a win over Kevin Curren in 1992 and was a doubles semi-finalist in 1993.

At the 1994 Asian Games he and Chang Eui-jong were silver medalists in the men's doubles.

== See also ==
- List of South Korea Davis Cup team representatives
