= Mike Walker (tennis) =

Welsh-Hong Kong tennis player (born 1966)

- Country (sports): (United Kingdom) Great Britain (British Hong Kong) Hong Kong
- Born: 21 April 1966 (age 58); Wales
- Height: 6 ft (183 cm)
- Plays: Left-handed

Singles
- Career record: 0–5
- Highest ranking: No. 407 (13 October 1986)

Grand Slam singles results
- Wimbledon: 1R (1986)

Doubles
- Career record: 0–3
- Highest ranking: No. 392 (25 May 1987)

Grand Slam doubles results
- Wimbledon: 1R (1987)

Mixed doubles

Grand Slam mixed doubles results
- Wimbledon: 1R (1988)

Michael Walker (born 21 April 1966) is a former professional tennis player from Wales who competed for Great Britain and Hong Kong.

== Professional playing career ==
Walker, who grew up in Colwyn Bay, was given a wild card into the 1986 Wimbledon Championships and lost his opening round match, which went five sets, to Swiss player Claudio Mezzadri. He returned to Wimbledon the following year, this time competing in the men's doubles, partnering Stephen Botfield. The pair were beaten in the first round by Glenn Layendecker and Glenn Michibata. He was a member of the Great Britain Davis Cup squad in 1987, although he wasn't called on to play a match. In the 1988 Wimbledon Championships he played mixed doubles with Joy Tacon, but was again unable to reach the second round.

== Coaching ==
The next part of his career was spent in Hong Kong, where he was involved in coaching. From 1988 to 1990 he was national coach of the Hong Kong Sports Institute and he was then coaching director of the Hong Kong Tennis Association, until 1994. During this time he also represented Hong Kong in the Davis Cup (both as a player and captain). Walker took part in eight ties, winning 10 of his 15 singles rubbers and five of his eight doubles rubbers. He and Mark Bailey are the most successful ever doubles pairing for Hong Kong, with a 4–1 record.

He is now running his own tennis academy in the United Kingdom.
