= Yang Jingzhu =

Chinese tennis player

- Country (sports): China
- Born: 19 January 1976 (age 49)
- Plays: Right-handed
- Prize money: $8,688

Singles
- Highest ranking: No. 873 (22 June 1998)

Doubles
- Career record: 0–1 (ATP Tour)
- Highest ranking: No. 507 (11 November 2002)
Medal record
Universiade
Bronze medal – third place	2001 Beijing	Men's doubles

Yang Jingzhu (born 19 January 1976) is a Chinese former professional tennis player.

In 1999 he made his only ATP Tour main draw appearance, partnering Li Si in doubles at the Shanghai Open. He and Si were beaten in the first round by the world's top ranked doubles pair, Mahesh Bhupathi and Leander Paes.

Yang featured in five Davis Cup ties for China and also represented his country in multi-sport events. He was a men's doubles bronze medalist at the 2001 Universiade in Beijing and also competed at the 2002 Asian Games in Busan.
