= Yasufumi Yamamoto =

Japanese tennis player (born 1971)

- Full name: Yasufumi Yamamoto
- Native name: 山本育史
- Country (sports): Japan
- Born: 3 May 1971 (age 54) Shizuoka, Japan
- Height: 5 ft 9 in (175 cm)
- Plays: Right-handed (one handed backhand)
- Prize money: $89,348

Singles
- Career record: 0–12
- Highest ranking: No. 291 (11 July 1994)

Doubles
- Career record: 0–2
- Highest ranking: No. 489 (30 November 1992)

Yasufumi Yamamoto (山本 育史, born 3 May 1971) is a former professional tennis player from Japan.

== Biography ==
Yamamoto, who comes from Shizuoka, played on the professional tour in the 1990s and featured in seven Davis Cup ties for Japan. Most of his ATP Tour main draw appearances were in his home country, including the Japan Open where he competed in singles on six occasions. He represented Japan at the Hopman Cup in both 1992 and 1993. At the 1994 Asian Games he was a member of the bronze medal-winning Japanese men's team.

== See also ==
- List of Japan Davis Cup team representatives
