= Chen Chih-jung =

Taiwanese tennis player

- Full name: Chen Chih-jung
- Country (sports): Chinese Taipei
- Born: 24 September 1972 (age 52)
- Height: 168 cm (5 ft 6 in)
- Prize money: $12,909

Singles
- Career record: 0–1
- Highest ranking: No. 572 (24 July 1995)

Doubles
- Career record: 0–1
- Highest ranking: No. 340 (23 November 1998)
Medal record
Men's Tennis
Representing Chinese Taipei
Asian Games
Bronze medal – third place	1998 Bangkok	Men's Doubles
Universiade
Gold medal – first place	1995 Fukuoka	Mixed Doubles

Chen Chih-jung (Chinese: 陳志榮, born 24 September 1972) is a Taiwanese former professional tennis player.

== Biography ==
Chen featured in his only ATP Tour main draw in 1992, at his home tournament in Taipei, where he received wildcard entry in both the singles and doubles.

During his career he represented his country in various multi-sport events. He won a mixed doubles gold medal at the 1995 Summer Universiade, held in Fukuoka. At the 1996 Summer Olympics in Atlanta he played in the men's doubles competition with Lien Yu-hui and they were beaten in the first round by the N’Goran brothers from the Ivory Coast. Partnering Lin Bing-chao, he claimed a bronze medal in the men's doubles at the 1998 Asian Games.

In 2000 he played in the last of his 17 Davis Cup ties for Chinese Taipei, finishing with a 19/18 overall record.
