= Hary Suharyadi =

Indonesian tennis player

- Born: 14 February 1965 (age 61)
- Spouse: Yayuk Basuki (m. 1994)

Suharyadi, also known as Hary Suharyadi and as Suharyadi Suharyadi onHments (born 14 February 1965) is a former tennis player from Indonesia. He competed in three Summer Olympics; the 1984 Los Angeles Games, 1988 in Seoul and 1992 in Barcelona.

He won gold on mixed doubles at the 1990 Asian Games in Beijing with Yayuk Basuki, whom he married on 31 January 1994 in Yogyakarta.
