= Alistair Hunt =

New Zealand tennis player (born 1972)

- Full name: Alistair Hunt
- Country (sports): New Zealand
- Born: 11 November 1972 (age 53) Christchurch, New Zealand
- Prize money: $76,749

Singles
- Career record: 12–17
- Career titles: 0
- Highest ranking: No. 184 (11 August 1997)

Grand Slam singles results
- Australian Open: Q1 (1996, 1998)
- French Open: Q2 (1999)
- Wimbledon: Q2 (1997)
- US Open: Q2 (1997)

Doubles
- Career record: 15–19
- Career titles: 0
- Highest ranking: No. 213 (31 March 1997)

Grand Slam doubles results
- Wimbledon: Q2 (1997)

Alistair Hunt (born 11 November 1972) is a former professional tennis player from New Zealand.

== Biography ==
Hunt grew up in Christchurch and was the top ranked junior in the country at under 18s level. As a junior he competed in the boys events at all four Grand Slam tournaments. He made the doubles quarter-finals at both the 1989 Australian Open and 1990 French Open, partnering Leander Paes in the latter.

On the ATP Tour he made most of his appearances at the Auckland Open, where he first competed in 1996 and featured in each of the next three tournaments. His best finish was the second round in 1998, with a win over world number 53 Daniel Vacek. He played in the main draw of one international tournament, which was the 1997 Bournemouth International. Beaten in the first round of the singles, he made better success in the doubles event, making it to the semi-finals with partner Brett Steven.

Hunt was a mainstay in the New Zealand Davis Cup team from 1995 to 2003, with a further tie in 2006. This included a World Group qualifier against Brazil in Florianópolis, where he played a singles rubber against Gustavo Kuerten. He played a total of 18 ties for New Zealand, for 19 overall wins, an 11/12 record in singles and 8/6 in doubles.

His best win in the Davis Cup came against Richard Krajicek at a 1996 tie in Haarlem, just three-months after the Dutchman had won Wimbledon. Hunt, ranked 294 at the time, took the first set in a tiebreak, but Krajicek recovered to win the next two. Krajicek, who was playing his first match at home since winning Wimbledon, was struggling with a knee injury by the time the fourth set started and retired hurt with Hunt ahead 4–1.

Since 2013, Hunt has captained New Zealand in the Davis Cup.

== See also ==
- List of New Zealand Davis Cup team representatives
