= Xia Jiaping =

Chinese tennis player

- Full name: Xia Jiaping
- Country (sports): China
- Born: 1 March 1969 (age 57) Shanghai, China
- Prize money: $39,911

Singles
- Career record: 7–15
- Career titles: 0
- Highest ranking: No. 252 (15 April 1991)

Doubles
- Career record: 3–14
- Career titles: 0
- Highest ranking: No. 313 (14 November 1994)
Medal record
Asian Games
Gold medal – first place	1990 Beijing	Team
Gold medal – first place	1990 Beijing	Men's Doubles
Gold medal – first place	1994 Hiroshima	Mixed Doubles
Bronze medal – third place	1994 Hiroshima	Men's Doubles
Summer Universiade
Gold medal – first place	1991 Sheffield	Singles

Xia Jiaping (Chinese: 夏嘉平; born 1 March 1969) is a former professional tennis player from the People's Republic of China.

== Biography ==
Xia, the grandson of a Chinese Davis Cup player, comes from Shanghai.

In the 1990s he competed in the main draw of ATP Tour level tournaments in Beijing, Hong Kong and Shanghai. He was runner-up at a 1996 Challenger event in Beijing.

=== Representative career ===
During his career he represented the People's Republic of China in the Asian Games, Davis Cup and Summer Olympics.

From 1989 to 1997, Xia played in a total of 18 Davis Cup ties for China. He won 20 singles matches, 29 overall, which is a team record.

At the 1990 Asian Games in Beijing he won two gold medals, in the men's doubles with Meng Qianghua and the other as a member of the men's team.

He partnered Meng Qianghua again at the 1992 Atlanta Olympics, where they were beaten in the first round of the men's doubles by Switzerland's Jakob Hlasek and Marc Rosset.

In Hiroshima in 1994 he won another Asian Games gold medal, with Li Fang in the mixed doubles.

He also made the men's doubles draw at the 1996 Atlanta Olympics. With partner Pan Bing, the Chinese pairing won the first set of their opening round match against India's Mahesh Bhupathi and Leander Paes, before losing in three sets.
