= Chang Eui-jong =

South Korean tennis player (born 1969)

- Hangul: 장의종
- RR: Jang Uijong
- MR: Chang Ŭijong

Chang Eui-jong
- Country (sports): South Korea
- Born: April 1, 1969 (age 57) Gokseong, South Korea
- Plays: Right-handed

Singles
- Career record: 10–15
- Highest ranking: No. 245 (June 17, 1991)

Doubles
- Career record: 11–10
Medal record
Representing South Korea
Summer Universiade
Gold medal – first place	1991 Sheffield	Doubles
Asian Games
Silver medal – second place	1994 Hiroshima	Doubles
Bronze medal – third place	1994 Hiroshima	Mixed doubles

Chang Eui-jong (born April 1, 1969) is a former tennis player from South Korea, who represented his native country as a qualifier at the 1992 Summer Olympics in Barcelona, where he was defeated in the first round by Spain's eventual runner up Jordi Arrese. The right-hander reached his highest singles ATP ranking on June 17, 1991, when he became number 245 in the world.
