= Sulistyo Wibowo =

Indonesian tennis player

- Country (sports): Indonesia
- Born: 17 February 1969 (age 57) Tegal, Central Java, Indonesia
- Prize money: $13,986

Singles
- Career record: 0–1 (ATP Tour)
- Highest ranking: No. 784 (26 October 1992)

Doubles
- Career record: 2–2 (ATP Tour)
- Highest ranking: No. 323 (22 September 1997)
Medal record
Universiade
Bronze medal – third place	1991 Sheffield	Doubles
Southeast Asian Games
Gold medal – first place	1995 Chiang Mai	Mixed
Gold medal – first place	1997 Jakarta	Doubles
Gold medal – first place	1997 Jakarta	Team
Gold medal – first place	2001 Kuala Lumpur	Team
Silver medal – second place	2001 Kuala Lumpur	Doubles
Bronze medal – third place	1995 Chiang Mai	Team
Bronze medal – third place	1997 Jakarta	Mixed

Sulistyo Wibowo (born 17 February 1969) is an Indonesian former professional tennis player.

== Biography ==
Born in Tegal, Wibowo is the brother of Fed Cup player Liza Andriyani.

Wibowo featured in 11 Davis Cup ties for Indonesia between 1996 and 2001. Playing as a doubles specialist, he won six Davis Cup rubbers, all partnering Bonit Wiryawan. He represented Indonesia with success at the Southeast Asian Games, where he won two gold medals in doubles and another two in the team event. His best performance at the Asian Games was a doubles quarter-final appearance at the 1998 event in Bangkok.

While competing on the professional tour, Wibowo made two ATP Tour doubles quarter-finals, both at the Indonesia Open, including the 1995 tournament when he partnered Mahesh Bhupathi. At the 1996 Indonesia Open he played in the main draw of the singles as a wildcard and lost in the first round to Austrian qualifier Herbert Wiltschnig in three sets.

== See also ==
- List of Indonesia Davis Cup team representatives
