= Joseph Lizardo =

Filipino tennis player (born 1969)

- Full name: Joseph Francisco Lizardo
- Country (sports): Philippines
- Born: January 17, 1969 (age 57)
- Height: 5 ft 9 in (175 cm)

Singles
- Career record: 12–15 (Davis Cup)
- Highest ranking: No. 731 (23 Oct 1995)

Doubles
- Career record: 0–3 (Davis Cup)
- Highest ranking: No. 883 (10 May 1993)
Medal record
Southeast Asian Games
Silver medal – second place	1995 Chiang Mai	Men's team
Silver medal – second place	1997 Jakarta	Men's singles
Bronze medal – third place	1995 Chiang Mai	Men's singles
Bronze medal – third place	1997 Jakarta	Men's team
Bronze medal – third place	1999 Bandar Seri Begawan	Men's team
Bronze medal – third place	2001 Kuala Lumpur	Men's team

Joseph "Popet" Francisco Lizardo (born January 17, 1969) is a Filipino former professional tennis player.

== Education ==
Lizardo attended the University of Santo Tomas High School before moving to the United States to study Temple University in Philadelphia under a full scholarship and obtained a double degree in international Business and marketing in 1991.

== Playing career ==
Lizardo began playing tennis competitively at age 12.

Lizardo played in the junior draws of Wimbledon and the US Open, before competing for Temple University as a scholar student-athlete. He won an A-10 singles championship in 1987.

By 1993, Lizardo emerged as the top player for the Philippines, a distinction he held until 1999. He represented the Philippines in the Davis Cup as well as in regional events, including the 1994 Asian Games. He won six medals for the Philippines at the Southeast Asian Games. In Davis Cup competition, Lizardo featured in a total of 14 ties, from 1992 to 1999, winning 12 singles rubbers. His best win came against former top-50 player Shuzo Matsuoka of Japan in 1995.

== Post-playing career ==
Lizardo was coach of the Ateneo Blue Eagles' tennis team from 1999 to 2000. He later became the head of the whole program for the sport.

He was the non-playing captain of the Philippine Davis Cup team in 2001 and later coach in 2024.

== Personal life ==
Lizardo is married to Filipino American actress Belinda Panelo. They became boyfriend-girlfriend in the late 1990s. They moved to New York in 2003 before resettling in California by 2017.The couple has two children.
