= Lin Bing-chao =

Taiwanese tennis player (born 1973)

- Full name: Lin Bing-chao
- Country (sports): Chinese Taipei
- Born: 28 October 1973 (age 52) Jakarta, Indonesia
- Height: 180 cm (5 ft 11 in)
- Plays: Right-Handed, Unknown Backhand
- Prize money: $48,098

Singles
- Career record: 8–14
- Career titles: 0
- Highest ranking: No. 240 (10 October 1994)
Medal record
Men's Tennis
Representing Chinese Taipei
Asian Games
Bronze medal – third place	1998 Bangkok	Men's Doubles
Universiade
Silver medal – second place	1999 Palma de Majorca	Mixed Doubles
Silver medal – second place	1997 Sicily	Mixed Doubles
Bronze medal – third place	1997 Sicily	Men's Singles

Lin Bing-chao (Chinese: 林秉超, formerly Benny Wijaya, born October 28, 1973, in Jakarta, Indonesia) is a retired Taiwanese tennis player.

Lin represented his native country as a qualifier at the 1992 Summer Olympics in Barcelona, where he was defeated in the first round by Canada's Andrew Sznajder.

The right-hander Lin reached his highest ATP singles ranking on October 10, 1994, when he became World No. 240.
