= Hong Kong Davis Cup team =

National tennis team

Hong Kong, China
- Captain: Hiu-Tung Yu
- Coach: David Catala Velasco
- Nations Ranking: 53 ▲2 (15 September 2025)
- Colors: red & white
- First year: 1970
- Years played: 48
- Ties played (W–L): 105 (54-51）
- Years in World Group: 4 (1-3)
- Best finish: Group I 1r (1989, 1993-95)
- Most total wins: Mark Bailey (29-16)
- Most singles wins: Mark Bailey (17-13); Colin Grant (17-15)
- Most doubles wins: Mark Bailey (12-3)
- Best doubles team: Michael Walker/Mark Bailey (4-1); Martin Sayer/Brian Hung (4-1)
- Most ties played: Yu Hiu Tung (24)
- Most years played: Yu Hiu Tung, Mark Bailey (11)

The Hong Kong men's national tennis team represents Hong Kong in Davis Cup tennis competition and are governed by the Hong Kong Tennis Association.

Hong Kong contested Asia/Oceania Group I on four occasions in 1989, 1993-95 but failed to negotiate the opening round.

== History ==
Hong Kong’s best Davis Cup performance came in late 1980s and mid 1990s. It competed in Asia / Oceania Group I in 1989 and also between 1993 and 1995.

== Current team (2026) ==
- Coleman Wong
- Jack Cheng
- Kai Thompson
- Siu Chi Nicholas Cheng
- Tsz Fu Wong

== See also ==
- Davis Cup
- Hong Kong Billie Jean King Cup team
