= Bonit Wiryawan =

Indonesian tennis player

- Full name: Bonit Wiryawan Sugiharto
- Country (sports): Indonesia
- Born: 10 February 1968 (age 58) Surabaya, Indonesia
- Height: 5 ft 8 in (173 cm)
- Plays: Right-handed
- Prize money: $35,246

Singles
- Career record: 0–2
- Highest ranking: No. 513 (9 July 1990)

Doubles
- Career record: 4–4
- Highest ranking: No. 290 (17 July 1995)

Bonit Wiryawan Sugiharto (born 10 February 1968) is a former professional tennis player from Indonesia.

== Biography ==
Wiryawan grew up in Surabaya, as one of six siblings. A right-handed player, he began competing on tour in the late 1980s.

At the 1990 Asian Games he won three bronze medals for Indonesia, in the men's doubles, mixed doubles and team event.

He represented Indonesia at the 1992 Summer Olympics in Barcelona, partnering Hary Suharyadi in the doubles competition, where they beat a Korean pair in the first round, before losing in the second round to the eventual bronze medalists from Croatia.

In both 1994 and 1995 he appeared in the singles main draw of the Jakarta Open ATP Tour tournament, losing to world number seven Michael Chang in the former. As a doubles player he made the semi-finals of the Jakarta Open in 1995, with partner Suwandi Suwandi.

He won numerous medals at the Southeast Asian Games, including a men's doubles gold in 1997 and mixed doubles gold in 2001.

During his 16-year Davis Cup career he featured in 29 ties for Indonesia, the last in 2007 as a 39 year old. He retired from Davis Cup competition as Indonesia's most successful doubles player in history, with 16 wins.

== See also ==
- List of Indonesia Davis Cup team representatives
