= Tennis at the SEA Games =

Tennis was part of the Southeast Asian Games from the inaugural 1959 Southeast Asian Peninsular Games It has been played at each edition of the games with the exception of 2013 Southeast Asian Games.

== Edition ==
=== SEAP Games ===
Games	Year	Host city	Events	Host country
I	1959	Bangkok	7	Thailand
II	1961	Rangoon	7	Burma
III	1965	Kuala Lumpur	7	Malaysia
IV	1967	Bangkok	7	Thailand
V	1969	Rangoon	7	Burma
VI	1971	Kuala Lumpur	7	Malaysia
VII	1973	Singapore	7	Singapore
VIII	1975	Bangkok	7	Thailand

=== SEA Games ===
Games	Year	Host city	Host country	Events	Best nation
IX	1977	Kuala Lumpur	Malaysia	7	Indonesia
X	1979	Jakarta	Indonesia	7	Indonesia
XI	1981	Manila	Philippines	7	Philippines
XII	1983	Singapore	Singapore	7	Indonesia
XIII	1985	Bangkok	Thailand	7	Indonesia
XIV	1987	Jakarta	Indonesia	7	Indonesia
XV	1989	Kuala Lumpur	Malaysia	7	Indonesia
XVI	1991	Manila	Philippines	7	Philippines
XVII	1993	Singapore	Singapore	7	Philippines
XVIII	1995	Chiang Mai	Thailand	7	Thailand
XIX	1997	Jakarta	Indonesia	7	Indonesia
XX	1999	Bandar Seri Begawan	Brunei	7	Thailand
XXI	2001	Kuala Lumpur	Malaysia	7	Indonesia
XXII	2003	Hanoi & Ho Chi Minh City	Vietnam	7	Thailand
XXIII	2005	Manila, Laguna, Cebu, Bacolod	Philippines	7	Indonesia
XXIV	2007 (	Nakhon Ratchasima	Thailand	7	Thailand
XXV	2009	Vientiane	Laos	7	Thailand
XXVI	2011	Palembang & Jakarta	Indonesia	7	Indonesia
XXVII	2013	Naypyidaw	Myanmar	0	No Competition
XXVIII	2015	Singapore	Singapore	7	Thailand
XXIX	2017	Kuala Lumpur	Malaysia	5	Thailand
XXX	2019	Manila	Philippines	5	Indonesia
XXXI	2021	Bắc Ninh	Vietnam	7	Thailand
XXXII	2023	Phnom Penh	Cambodia	7	Indonesia
XXXIII	2025	Nonthaburi	Thailand	7	Thailand

== Medal table ==
* Host nation (The table only shows the number of medals from 1977-present)

Rank	Nation	Gold	Silver	Bronze	Total
1	Indonesia (INA)	74	54	68	196
2	Thailand (THA)	57	53	63	173
3	Philippines (PHI)	23	36	55	114
4	Vietnam (VIE)	2	7	18	27
5	Malaysia (MAS)	0	3	18	21
6	Singapore (SGP)	0	2	4	6
7	Myanmar (MYA)	0	2	2	4
8	Cambodia (CAM)	0	0	5	5
9	Brunei (BRU)	0	0	1	1
9	Laos (LAO)	0	0	1	1
Totals (10 entries)		156	157	235	548

== Medalists ==
=== Men ===
==== Men's singles ====
Year	Location	Gold	Silver	Bronze
1959	Bangkok	(Thailand) Sutiraphan Karalak	(South Vietnam) Võ Văn Bảy	(Singapore) Ong Chew Bee
1961	Yangon	(South Vietnam) Võ Văn Bảy	(Thailand) Seri Charuchinda	
1965	Kuala Lumpur	(Thailand) Somparn Champisri	(Thailand) Seri Charuchinda	(South Vietnam) Lưu Hoàng Đức
1967	Bangkok	(South Vietnam) Võ Văn Thành		
1969	Yangon	(Myanmar) Maung Maung Lay		
1971	Kuala Lumpur	(Thailand) Somparn Champisri	(South Vietnam) Võ Văn Thành	(South Vietnam) Võ Văn Bảy
1973	Singapore	(Thailand) Somparn Champisri	(South Vietnam) Võ Văn Thành	(South Vietnam) Võ Văn Bảy
1975	Bangkok	(Myanmar) Maung Maung Lay		
1977	Kuala Lumpur	(Indonesia) Atet Wijono	(Indonesia) Yustedjo Tarik	(Thailand) Somparn Champisri
1979	Jakarta	(Indonesia) Yustedjo Tarik	(Philippines) Manuel Valleramos	(Indonesia) Atet Wijono
1981	Manila	(Thailand) Panomkorn Pladchurnil	(Thailand) Sombat Uamongkol	(Philippines) Manuel Valleramos
1983	Singapore	(Philippines) Manuel Valleramos	(Indonesia) Tintus Arianto Wibowo	(Thailand) Sombat Uamongkol
1985	Bangkok	(Indonesia) Tintus Arianto Wibowo	(Thailand) Panomkorn Pladchurnil	(Philippines) Manuel Tolentino (Philippines) Rod Rafael
1987	Jakarta	(Indonesia) Tintus Arianto Wibowo	(Philippines) Andres Battad	(Philippines) Manuel Tolentino
1989	Kuala Lumpur	(Thailand) Woraphol Thongkhamchu	(Indonesia) Tintus Arianto Wibowo	(Malaysia) V. Selvam
1991	Manila	(Philippines) Felix Barrientos	(Indonesia) Benny Wijaya	(Philippines) Roland So
1993	Singapore	(Indonesia) Suwandi	(Philippines) Roland So	(Malaysia) Ramayah Ramachandran (Philippines) Felix Barrientos
1995	Chiang Mai	(Thailand) Woraphol Thongkhamchu	(Thailand) Thanakorn Srichaphan	(Indonesia) Suwandi (Philippines) Joseph Lizardo
1997	Jakarta	(Thailand) Paradorn Srichaphan	(Philippines) Joseph Lizardo	(Indonesia) Andrian Raturandang (Indonesia) Suwandi
1999	Bandar Seri Begawan	(Thailand) Paradorn Srichaphan	(Philippines) Bryan Juinio	(Thailand) Danai Udomchoke (Indonesia) Suwandi
2001	Kuala Lumpur	(Thailand) Danai Udomchoke	(Indonesia) Suwandi	(Malaysia) V. Selvam (Indonesia) Peter Handoyo
2003	Ho Chi Minh City	(Thailand) Danai Udomchoke	(Indonesia) Febi Widhiyanto	(Thailand) Attapol Rithiwattanapong (Indonesia) Prima Simpatiaji
2005	Manila	(Philippines) Cecil Mamiit	(Thailand) Danai Udomchoke	(Philippines) Eric Taino (Indonesia) Prima Simpatiaji
2007	Nakhon Ratchasima	(Philippines) Cecil Mamiit	(Thailand) Danai Udomchoke	(Cambodia) Tan Nysan (Indonesia) Elbert Sie
2009	Vientiane	(Philippines) Cecil Mamiit	(Philippines) Treat Huey	(Cambodia) Tan Nysan (Thailand) Danai Udomchoke
2011	Palembang	(Indonesia) Christopher Rungkat	(Thailand) Danai Udomchoke	(Philippines) Cecil Mamiit (Indonesia) Elbert Sie
2013	Naypyidaw	no competition - Myanmar, the host country, dropped tennis due to the host’s lack of athletes and inability to provide facilities.		
2015	Singapore	(Thailand) Warit Sornbutnark	(Indonesia) David Agung Susanto	(Philippines) Jeson Patrombon (Cambodia) Bun Kenny
2017	Kuala Lumpur	(Indonesia) Christopher Rungkat	(Thailand) Jirat Navasirisomboon	(Vietnam) Lý Hoàng Nam (Thailand) Wishaya Trongcharoenchaikul
2019	Manila	(Vietnam) Lý Hoàng Nam	(Vietnam) Daniel Cao Nguyen	(Philippines) Alberto Lim (Philippines) Jeson Patrombon
2021	Hanoi	(Vietnam) Lý Hoàng Nam	(Vietnam) Trinh Linh Giang	(Laos) Mick Lescure Sadettan (Thailand) Yuttana Charoenphon
2023	Phnom Penh	(Indonesia) Muhammad Rifqi Fitriadi	(Vietnam) Lý Hoàng Nam	(Cambodia) Bun Kenny (Thailand) Kasidit Samrej
2025	Nonthaburi	(Thailand) Maximus Jones	(Thailand) Kasidit Samrej	(Indonesia) Muhammad Rifqi Fitriadi (Malaysia) Mitsuki Wei Kang Leong

==== Men's doubles ====
Year	Location	Gold	Silver	Bronze
1959	Bangkok	(South Vietnam) Võ Văn Bảy-Võ Văn Thành		(Singapore) Ong Chew Bee-Khong Kit Soon
1961	Yangon	(South Vietnam) Võ Văn Bảy-Võ Văn Thành		
1965	Kuala Lumpur	(South Vietnam) Võ Văn Thành-Lưu Hoàng Đức	(Thailand) Seri Charuchinda-Somparn Champisri	(Singapore) Sharin Osman-T S Kim
1967	Bangkok	(South Vietnam) Võ Văn Bảy-Lưu Hoàng Đức		
1969	Yangon	(South Vietnam) Võ Văn Bảy-Võ Văn Thành		
1971	Kuala Lumpur	(South Vietnam) Võ Văn Bảy-Lý Aline		
1973	Singapore	(South Vietnam) Võ Văn Bảy (South Vietnam) Ly Alline	(Thailand) Somparan Champisri (Thailand) Pichit Boratisa	(Malaysia) Zainuddin Meah (Malaysia) Mohd. Akbar Baba
1975	Bangkok			
1977	Kuala Lumpur	(Indonesia) Gondo Widjojo and Atet Wijono	(Indonesia) Yustedjo Tarik and Hadiman	(Myanmar) Than Htut and Than Ngwe
1979	Jakarta	(Indonesia) Gondo Widjojo and Atet Wijono	(Indonesia) Yustedjo Tarik and Hadiman	(Thailand) Sombat Uamongkol and Panomkorn Pladchurnil
1981	Manila	(Philippines) Alexander Marcial and Rudolf Gabriel	(Indonesia) Yustedjo Tarik and Tintus Arianto Wibowo	(Philippines) Romeo Rafon and Manuel Valleramos
1983	Singapore	(Thailand) Sombat Uamongkol and Panomkorn Pladchurnil	(Indonesia) Tintus Arianto Wibowo and Yustedjo Tarik	(Indonesia) Hadiman and Donald Wailan-Walalangi
1985	Bangkok	(Thailand) Thanakorn Srichaphan and Woraphol Thongkhamchu	(Indonesia) Sulistyono and Donald Wailan-Walalangi	(Thailand) Sombat Uamongkol and Panomkorn Pladchurnil
1985	Bangkok	(Thailand) Thanakorn Srichaphan and Woraphol Thongkhamchu	(Indonesia) Sulistyono and Donald Wailan-Walalangi	(Indonesia) Tintus Arianto Wibowo and Suharyadi
1987	Jakarta	(Indonesia) Suharyadi and Donald Wailan-Walalangi	(Thailand) Panomkorn Pladchurnil	(Indonesia) Abdul Kahar Mim and Tintus Arianto Wibowo
1989	Kuala Lumpur	(Indonesia) Tintus Arianto Wibowo and Daniel Heryanto	(Indonesia) Suharyadi and Donald Wailan-Walalangi	(Thailand) Thanakorn Srichaphan and Woraphol Thongkhamchu
1991	Manila	(Philippines) Felix Barrientos and Roland So	(Thailand) Narathorn Srichaphan and Thanakorn Srichaphan	(Indonesia) Aga Soemarno and Dede Suhendar Dinata
1993	Singapore	(Thailand) Woraphol Thongkhamchu and Vittaya Samrej	(Indonesia) Donny Susetyo and Suwandi	(Indonesia) Teddy Tandjung and Andrian Raturandang
1993	Singapore	(Thailand) Woraphol Thongkhamchu and Vittaya Samrej	(Indonesia) Donny Susetyo and Suwandi	(Philippines) Sofronio Palahang and Robert Angelo
1995	Chiang Mai	(Thailand) Narathorn Srichaphan and Thanakorn Srichaphan	(Thailand) Woraphol Thongkhamchu and Vittaya Samrej	(Philippines) Sofronio Palahang and Robert Angelo
1995	Chiang Mai	(Thailand) Narathorn Srichaphan and Thanakorn Srichaphan	(Thailand) Woraphol Thongkhamchu and Vittaya Samrej	(Indonesia) Suwandi and Edi Kusdaryanto
1997	Jakarta	(Indonesia) Sulistyo Wibowo and Bonit Wiryawan	(Thailand) Narathorn Srichaphan and Paradorn Srichaphan	(Thailand) Woraphol Thongkhamchu and Vittaya Samrej
1997	Jakarta	(Indonesia) Sulistyo Wibowo and Bonit Wiryawan	(Thailand) Narathorn Srichaphan and Paradorn Srichaphan	(Indonesia) Suwandi and Andrian Raturandang
1999	Bandar Seri Begawan	(Thailand) Narathorn Srichaphan and Paradorn Srichaphan	(Thailand) Danai Udomchoke and Vittaya Samrej	(Indonesia) Suwandi and Yusmawan Fahmi
1999	Bandar Seri Begawan	(Thailand) Narathorn Srichaphan and Paradorn Srichaphan	(Thailand) Danai Udomchoke and Vittaya Samrej	(Indonesia) Febi Widhiyanto and Hendri Susilo Pramono
2001	Kuala Lumpur	(Thailand) Vittaya Samrej and Danai Udomchoke	(Indonesia) Sulistyo Wibowo and Bonit Wiryawan	(Malaysia) Adam Jaya and Mohd Nazreen Fuzi
2001	Kuala Lumpur	(Thailand) Vittaya Samrej and Danai Udomchoke	(Indonesia) Sulistyo Wibowo and Bonit Wiryawan	(Thailand) Pracharapol Khamsaman and Attapol Rithiwattanapong
2003	Ho Chi Minh City	(Thailand) Sanchai Ratiwatana and Sonchat Ratiwatana	(Indonesia) Hendri Susilo Pramono and Suwandi	(Vietnam) Đỗ Minh Quân and Lê Quốc Khánh
2003	Ho Chi Minh City	(Thailand) Sanchai Ratiwatana and Sonchat Ratiwatana	(Indonesia) Hendri Susilo Pramono and Suwandi	(Indonesia) Prima Simpatiaji and Febi Widhiyanto
2005	Manila	(Thailand) Sanchai Ratiwatana and Sonchat Ratiwatana	(Philippines) Cecil Mamiit and Eric Taino	(Indonesia) Suwandi and Bonit Wiryawan
2005	Manila	(Thailand) Sanchai Ratiwatana and Sonchat Ratiwatana	(Philippines) Cecil Mamiit and Eric Taino	(Indonesia) Prima Simpatiaji and Sunu Wahyu Trijati
2007	Nakhon Ratchasima	(Thailand) Sanchai Ratiwatana and Sonchat Ratiwatana	(Philippines) Cecil Mamiit and Eric Taino	(Indonesia) Elbert Sie and Christopher Rungkat
2007	Nakhon Ratchasima	(Thailand) Sanchai Ratiwatana and Sonchat Ratiwatana	(Philippines) Cecil Mamiit and Eric Taino	(Vietnam) Lê Quốc Khánh and Đỗ Minh Quân
2009	Vientiane	(Thailand) Sanchai Ratiwatana and Sonchat Ratiwatana	(Philippines) Cecil Mamiit and Treat Huey	(Indonesia) Nesa Arta and Christopher Rungkat
2009	Vientiane	(Thailand) Sanchai Ratiwatana and Sonchat Ratiwatana	(Philippines) Cecil Mamiit and Treat Huey	(Thailand) Danai Udomchoke and Kittipong Wachiramanowong
2011	Palembang	(Indonesia) Christopher Rungkat and Elbert Sie	(Philippines) Cecil Mamiit and Treat Huey	(Vietnam) Đỗ Minh Quân and Ngô Quang Huy
2011	Palembang	(Indonesia) Christopher Rungkat and Elbert Sie	(Philippines) Cecil Mamiit and Treat Huey	(Thailand) Danai Udomchoke and Kittipong Wachiramanowong
2013	Naypyidaw	no competition - Myanmar, the host country, dropped tennis due to the host’s lack of athletes and inability to provide facilities.		
2015	Singapore	(Thailand) Sanchai Ratiwatana and Sonchat Ratiwatana	(Philippines) Ruben Gonzales and Jeson Patrombon	(Philippines) Francis Alcantara and Treat Huey
2015	Singapore	(Thailand) Sanchai Ratiwatana and Sonchat Ratiwatana	(Philippines) Ruben Gonzales and Jeson Patrombon	(Thailand) Warit Sornbutnark and Kittipong Wachiramanowong
2017	Kuala Lumpur	(Thailand) Sanchai Ratiwatana and Sonchat Ratiwatana	(Philippines) Francis Alcantara and Ruben Gonzales	(Vietnam) Lý Hoàng Nam and Nguyễn Hoàng Thiên
2017	Kuala Lumpur	(Thailand) Sanchai Ratiwatana and Sonchat Ratiwatana	(Philippines) Francis Alcantara and Ruben Gonzales	(Thailand) Kittipong Wachiramanowong and Wishaya Trongcharoenchaikul
2019	Manila	(Philippines) Jeson Patrombon; Francis Alcantara	(Philippines) Treat Huey; Ruben Gonzales	(Vietnam) Lý Hoàng Nam and Lê Quốc Khánh
2019	Manila	(Philippines) Jeson Patrombon; Francis Alcantara	(Philippines) Treat Huey; Ruben Gonzales	(Vietnam) Daniel Cao Nguyen and Nguyễn Văn Phương
2021	Hanoi	(Philippines) Treat Huey; Ruben Gonzalez	(Philippines) Jeson Patrombon; Francis Alcantara	(Vietnam) Trinh Linh Giang; Pham Minh Tuan
2021	Hanoi	(Philippines) Treat Huey; Ruben Gonzalez	(Philippines) Jeson Patrombon; Francis Alcantara	(Vietnam) Lê Quốc Khánh; Nguyễn Văn Phương
2023	Phnom Penh	(Philippines) Ruben Gonzalez; Francis Alcantara	(Indonesia) Christopher Rungkat; Nathan Anthony Barki	(Malaysia) Koay Hao Sheng; Mitsuki Leong Wei Kang
2023	Phnom Penh	(Philippines) Ruben Gonzalez; Francis Alcantara	(Indonesia) Christopher Rungkat; Nathan Anthony Barki	(Vietnam) Nguyễn Dac Tien; Nguyễn Văn Phương
2025	Nonthaburi	(Thailand) Maximus Jones; Pruchya Isaro	(Thailand) Pawit Sornlaksup; Wishaya Trongcharoenchaikul	(Indonesia) Muhammad Rifqi Fitriadi; Christopher Rungkat
2025	Nonthaburi	(Thailand) Maximus Jones; Pruchya Isaro	(Thailand) Pawit Sornlaksup; Wishaya Trongcharoenchaikul	(Indonesia) Ignatius Anthony Susanto; Lucky Candra Kurniawan

==== Men's team ====
Year	Location	Gold	Silver	Bronze
1965	Kuala Lumpur	Thailand (THA)	South Vietnam (VNM)	
1967	Bangkok	South Vietnam (VNM)		
1969	Yangon	South Vietnam (VNM)		
1971	Kuala Lumpur	South Vietnam (VNM)	Thailand (THA)	Malaysia (MAS)
1971	Kuala Lumpur	South Vietnam (VNM)	Thailand (THA)	Burma (BIR)
1973	Singapore	Thailand (THA)	Laos (LAO)	Singapore (SIN)
1975	Bangkok			
1977	Kuala Lumpur	Indonesia (INA); Hadiman; Yustedjo Tarik; Gondo Widjojo; Atet Wijono	Burma (BIR); Aung Htay; Than Htut; Maung Maung Lay; Than Ngwe	Thailand (THA); Pichet Boratisa; Somparn Champisri; Prasert Kaimarn; Chana Techasanen
1979	Jakarta	Indonesia (INA); Hadiman; Yustedjo Tarik; Gondo Widjojo; Atet Wijono	Burma (BIR); Than Htut	Philippines (PHI); Manuel Castillon; Rudolf Gabriel; Ramon Navalpa; Manuel Valleramos
1981	Manila	Indonesia (INA); Hadiman; Yustedjo Tarik; Tintus Arianto Wibowo; Atet Wijono	Singapore (SIN); Mahader Hassan; Victor Pereira; Hashim Sidek; Albert Teo	Philippines (PHI); Rudolf Gabriel; Alexander Marcial; Romeo Rafon; Manuel Valleramos
1983	Singapore	Indonesia (INA); Hadiman; Yustedjo Tarik; Donald Wailan-Walalangi; Tintus Arianto Wibowo	Philippines (PHI); Rudolf Gabriel; Alexander Marcial; Manuel Tolentino; Manuel Valleramos	Thailand (THA); Suthorn Klaharn; Supoj Meesawad; Panomkorn Pladchurnil; Sombat Uamongkol
1985	Bangkok	Indonesia (INA); Suharyadi; Sulistyono; Donald Wailan-Walalangi; Tintus Arianto Wibowo	Philippines (PHI); Roselle Nilo Natividad; Rod Rafael; Raymundo Suarez; Manuel Tolentino	Thailand (THA); Panomkorn Pladchurnil; Thanakorn Srichaphan; Woraphol Thongkhamchu; Sombat Uamongkol
1985	Bangkok	Indonesia (INA); Suharyadi; Sulistyono; Donald Wailan-Walalangi; Tintus Arianto Wibowo	Philippines (PHI); Roselle Nilo Natividad; Rod Rafael; Raymundo Suarez; Manuel Tolentino	Singapore (SIN); Mahader Hassan; Victor Pereira; Hashim Sidek; Albert Teo
1987	Jakarta	Indonesia (INA); Abdul Kahar Mim; Suharyadi; Donald Wailan-Walalangi; Tintus Arianto Wibowo	Philippines (PHI); Andres Battad; Rod Rafael; Raymundo Suarez; Manuel Tolentino	Thailand (THA); Panomkorn Pladchurnil; Vittaya Samrej; Thanakorn Srichaphan; Woraphol Thongkhamchu
1989	Kuala Lumpur	Thailand (THA); Panomkorn Pladchurnil; Vittaya Samrej; Thanakorn Srichaphan; Woraphol Thongkhamchu	Philippines (PHI); Andres Battad; Julio Carluen; Danilo Pila; Rod Rafael	Indonesia (INA); Daniel Heryanto; Suharyadi; Donald Wailan-Walalangi; Tintus Arianto Wibowo
1991	Manila	Thailand (THA); Vittaya Samrej; Narathorn Srichaphan; Thanakorn Srichaphan; Woraphol Thongkhamchu	Philippines (PHI); Felix Barrientos; Sofronio Palahang; Danilo Pila; Roland So	Indonesia (INA); Dede Suhendar Dinata; Aga Soemarno; Benny Wijaya; Bonit Wiryawan
1993	Singapore	Philippines (PHI); Robert Angelo; Felix Barrientos; Sofronio Palahang; Roland So	Thailand (THA); Vittaya Samrej; Woraphol Thongkhamchu	Indonesia (INA); Andrian Raturandang; Donny Susetyo; Suwandi; Teddy Tandjung
1993	Singapore	Philippines (PHI); Robert Angelo; Felix Barrientos; Sofronio Palahang; Roland So	Thailand (THA); Vittaya Samrej; Woraphol Thongkhamchu	Singapore (SIN)
1995	Chiang Mai	Thailand (THA); Vittaya Samrej; Narathorn Srichaphan; Thanakorn Srichaphan; Woraphol Thongkhamchu	Philippines (PHI); Robert Angelo; Joseph Lizardo; Sofronio Palahang	Singapore (SIN); Chen Chee Yen; Adrian Lam; Sherman Lim; Evan Woo
1995	Chiang Mai	Thailand (THA); Vittaya Samrej; Narathorn Srichaphan; Thanakorn Srichaphan; Woraphol Thongkhamchu	Philippines (PHI); Robert Angelo; Joseph Lizardo; Sofronio Palahang	Indonesia (INA); Edi Kusdaryanto; Suwandi; Sulistyo Wibowo; Bonit Wiryawan
1997	Jakarta	Indonesia (INA); Andrian Raturandang; Suwandi; Sulistyo Wibowo; Bonit Wiryawan	Thailand (THA); Vittaya Samrej; Narathorn Srichaphan; Paradorn Srichaphan; Woraphol Thongkhamchu	Vietnam (VIE)
1997	Jakarta	Indonesia (INA); Andrian Raturandang; Suwandi; Sulistyo Wibowo; Bonit Wiryawan	Thailand (THA); Vittaya Samrej; Narathorn Srichaphan; Paradorn Srichaphan; Woraphol Thongkhamchu	Philippines (PHI); Robert Angelo; Bryan Juinio; Joseph Lizardo; Michael John Misa
1999	Bandar Seri Begawan	Thailand (THA); Vittaya Samrej; Narathorn Srichaphan; Paradorn Srichaphan; Danai Udomchoke	Indonesia (INA); Yusmawan Fahmi; Hendri Susilo Pramono; Suwandi; Febi Widhiyanto	Philippines (PHI); Bryan Juinio; Joseph Lizardo; Michael John Misa; Dante Santa Cruz
1999	Bandar Seri Begawan	Thailand (THA); Vittaya Samrej; Narathorn Srichaphan; Paradorn Srichaphan; Danai Udomchoke	Indonesia (INA); Yusmawan Fahmi; Hendri Susilo Pramono; Suwandi; Febi Widhiyanto	Brunei (BRU); Cheong Nelson Anderson; Ibrahim Ak Ismasuflan; Lu On Sie; Wong Kee Hing Johnson
2001	Kuala Lumpur	Indonesia; Suwandi; Peter Handoyo; Bonit Wiryawan; Sulistyo Wibowo	Thailand; Danai Udomchoke; Vittaya Samrej; Pracharapol Khamsaman; Attapol Rithiwattanapong	Myanmar; Maung Zaw Zaw Latt; Khin Maung Win; M Tu Tu Ja; Maung Tu Maw
2001	Kuala Lumpur	Indonesia; Suwandi; Peter Handoyo; Bonit Wiryawan; Sulistyo Wibowo	Thailand; Danai Udomchoke; Vittaya Samrej; Pracharapol Khamsaman; Attapol Rithiwattanapong	Philippines; Johnny Arcilla; Joseph Victorino; Michael Mora III; Joseph Lizardo
2003	Ho Chi Minh City	Indonesia; Prima Simpatiaji; Febi Widhiyanto; Hendri Susilo Pramono; Suwandi	Thailand; Attapol Rithiwattanapong; Danai Udomchoke; Sanchai Ratiwatana; Sonchat Ratiwatana	Vietnam; Lê Quốc Khánh; Đỗ Minh Quân; Huynh Chi Khuong; Ngô Quang Huy
2003	Ho Chi Minh City	Indonesia; Prima Simpatiaji; Febi Widhiyanto; Hendri Susilo Pramono; Suwandi	Thailand; Attapol Rithiwattanapong; Danai Udomchoke; Sanchai Ratiwatana; Sonchat Ratiwatana	Malaysia; Dannio Yahya; Si Yew Ming; Mohd Noor Nordin
2005	Manila	Philippines; Cecil Mamiit; Eric Taino; Johnny Arcilla; Patrick John Tierro	Indonesia; Prima Simpatiaji; Suwandi; Sunu Wahyu Trijati; Bonit Wiryawan	Thailand; Sanchai Ratiwatana; Sonchat Ratiwatana; Weerapat Doakmaiklee; Danai Udomchoke
2005	Manila	Philippines; Cecil Mamiit; Eric Taino; Johnny Arcilla; Patrick John Tierro	Indonesia; Prima Simpatiaji; Suwandi; Sunu Wahyu Trijati; Bonit Wiryawan	Vietnam; Đỗ Minh Quân; Ngô Quang Huy; Lê Quốc Khánh
2007	Nakhon Ratchasima	Thailand; Danai Udomchoke; Sanchai Ratiwatana; Sonchat Ratiwatana; Weerapat Doakmaiklee	Indonesia; Christopher Rungkat; Suwandi; Elbert Sie	Philippines; Eric Taino; Patrick John Tierro; Cecil Mamiit; Johnny Arcilla
2007	Nakhon Ratchasima	Thailand; Danai Udomchoke; Sanchai Ratiwatana; Sonchat Ratiwatana; Weerapat Doakmaiklee	Indonesia; Christopher Rungkat; Suwandi; Elbert Sie	Vietnam; Lê Quốc Khánh; Đỗ Minh Quân; Ngô Quang Huy; Tran Thanh Hoang
2009	Vientiane	Philippines; Cecil Mamiit; Treat Huey; Johnny Arcilla; Patrick John Tierro	Thailand; Danai Udomchoke; Kittipong Wachiramanowong; Sanchai Ratiwatana; Sonchat Ratiwatana	Indonesia; Christopher Rungkat; Sunu Wahyu Trijati; Surya Wijaya Budi; Nesa Arta
2009	Vientiane	Philippines; Cecil Mamiit; Treat Huey; Johnny Arcilla; Patrick John Tierro	Thailand; Danai Udomchoke; Kittipong Wachiramanowong; Sanchai Ratiwatana; Sonchat Ratiwatana	Vietnam; Hoang Thanh Trung; Đỗ Minh Quân; Lê Quốc Khánh; Bu Tri Nguyen
2011	Palembang	Indonesia; Christopher Rungkat; Elbert Sie; Aditya Hari Sasongko; David Agung Susanto	Philippines; Cecil Mamiit; Jeson Patrombon; Treat Huey	Thailand; Danai Udomchoke; Kittipong Wachiramanowong; Sanchai Ratiwatana; Sonchat Ratiwatana
2011	Palembang	Indonesia; Christopher Rungkat; Elbert Sie; Aditya Hari Sasongko; David Agung Susanto	Philippines; Cecil Mamiit; Jeson Patrombon; Treat Huey	Cambodia; Orn Sambath; Bun Kenny; Long Samneang
2013	Naypyidaw	no competition - Myanmar, the host country, dropped tennis due to the host’s lack of athletes and inability to provide facilities.		
2015	Singapore	Thailand; Sanchai Ratiwatana; Sonchat Ratiwatana; Danai Udomchoke; Kittipong Wachiramanowong	Indonesia; Christopher Rungkat; Aditya Hari Sasongko; David Agung Susanto; Sunu Wahyu Trijati	Malaysia; Ariez Deen Heshaam; Mohd Merzuki; Syed Syed Naguib; Muhammad Zainal Abidin
2015	Singapore	Thailand; Sanchai Ratiwatana; Sonchat Ratiwatana; Danai Udomchoke; Kittipong Wachiramanowong	Indonesia; Christopher Rungkat; Aditya Hari Sasongko; David Agung Susanto; Sunu Wahyu Trijati	Philippines; Francis Alcantara; Ruben Gonzales; Treat Huey; Jeson Patrombon
2017	Kuala Lumpur	not held		
2019	Manila	not held		
2021	Hanoi	Thailand; Yuttana Charoenphon; Kasidit Samrej; Pruchya Isaro; Thantub Suksumrarn	Indonesia; Christopher Rungkat; Rifqy Sukma; Muhammad Rifqi Fitriadi; Achad Imam Maruf	Malaysia; Syed Mohd Agil Syed Naguib; Hao Sheng Koay; Imran Daniel Abdul Hazli; Muhammad Aiman Hamdan
2021	Hanoi	Thailand; Yuttana Charoenphon; Kasidit Samrej; Pruchya Isaro; Thantub Suksumrarn	Indonesia; Christopher Rungkat; Rifqy Sukma; Muhammad Rifqi Fitriadi; Achad Imam Maruf	Philippines; Jeson Patrombon; Ruben Gonzales; Treat Huey; Eric Jr Olivarez
2023	Phnom Penh	Thailand; Yuttana Charoenphon; Kasidit Samrej; Pruchya Isaro; Thantub Suksumrarn	Vietnam; Lý Hoàng Nam; Nguyễn Văn Phương; Phạm Minh Tuấn; Trịnh Linh Giang	Malaysia; Christian Andre Liew Sheng; Koay Hao Sheng; Mitsuki Leong Wei Kang
2023	Phnom Penh	Thailand; Yuttana Charoenphon; Kasidit Samrej; Pruchya Isaro; Thantub Suksumrarn	Vietnam; Lý Hoàng Nam; Nguyễn Văn Phương; Phạm Minh Tuấn; Trịnh Linh Giang	Indonesia; Christopher Rungkat; David Agung Susanto; Muhammad Rifqi Fitriadi; Nathan Anthony Barki
2025	Nonthaburi	Indonesia; Christopher Rungkat; Ignatius Anthony Susanto; Justin Barki; Lucky Candra Kurniawan; Muhammad Rifqi Fitriadi	Thailand; Kasidit Samrej; Maximus Jones; Pawit Sornlaksup; Pruchya Isaro; Wishaya Trongcharoenchaikul	Philippines; Alberto Lim Jr. Arthur Craig Pantino; Eric Olivarez Jr. Francis Alcantara; Ruben Gonzales
2025	Nonthaburi	Indonesia; Christopher Rungkat; Ignatius Anthony Susanto; Justin Barki; Lucky Candra Kurniawan; Muhammad Rifqi Fitriadi	Thailand; Kasidit Samrej; Maximus Jones; Pawit Sornlaksup; Pruchya Isaro; Wishaya Trongcharoenchaikul	Malaysia; Darrshan Suresh Kumar; Imran Daniel Abd Hazli; Koay Hao Sheng; Mitsuki Wei Kang Leong; Naufal Siddiq Kamaruzzaman

=== Women ===
==== Women's singles ====
Year	Location	Gold	Silver	Bronze
1959	Bangkok	(Thailand) Phanow Susawadi	(Thailand) Sanguan Sucharitakul	(Malaysia) Katherine Leong
1961	Yangon	(Thailand) Sanguan Sucharitakul	(Thailand) Phanow Sudsaswadi	(Thailand) Choolarb Wasuwat
1965	Kuala Lumpur	(Thailand) Phanow Sudsawadsi	(Malaysia) Zaiton Wan Suleiman	(South Vietnam) Nguyễn Thị Giỏi
1967	Bangkok	(Thailand) Phanow Sudsawadsi	(Thailand) Somsri Klamssombuti	(South Vietnam) Nguyễn Thị Giỏi
1969	Yangon	(Malaysia) Radhika Menon	(South Vietnam) Nguyễn Thị Giỏi	(Malaysia) Lian Lai Yee
1971	Kuala Lumpur	(Thailand) Somsri Klamssombuti	(Malaysia) Lim Kheow Suan	(South Vietnam) Nguyễn Thị Thình
1973	Singapore	(Thailand) Somsri Klamssombuti	(South Vietnam) Nguyễn Thị Thình	(Malaysia) Lim Kheow Suan
1975	Bangkok	(Thailand) Suthasini Sirikaya	(Thailand) Phanompol Chuchom	(Thailand) Chalatip Dhunwatnachit
1977	Kuala Lumpur	(Indonesia) Yolanda Soemarno	(Philippines) Marisa Sanchez	(Indonesia) Lany Lumanauw
1979	Jakarta	(Indonesia) Lita Liem Sugiarto	(Thailand) Cheladda Chanmareong	(Thailand) Suthasince Sirikaya
1981	Manila	(Philippines) Pia Tamayo	(Indonesia) Suzanna Anggarkusuma	(Indonesia) Yolanda Soemarno
1983	Singapore	(Thailand) Jongkrak Sreud	(Singapore) Lim Phi-Lan	(Indonesia) Suzanna Anggarkusuma
1985	Bangkok	(Indonesia) Suzanna Anggarkusuma	(Thailand) Sakolwan Kacharoen	(Indonesia) Yayuk Basuki (Thailand) Tosporn Summa
1987	Jakarta	(Indonesia) Yayuk Basuki	(Indonesia) Suzanna Anggarkusuma	(Thailand) Sakolwan Kacharoen
1989	Kuala Lumpur	(Indonesia) Yayuk Basuki	(Indonesia) Suzanna Anggarkusuma	(Thailand) Orawan Thampensri
1991	Manila	(Thailand) Suvimol Duangchan	(Indonesia) Joice Sutedja	(Thailand) Benjamas Sangaram
1993	Singapore	(Indonesia) Romana Tedjakusuma	(Philippines) Evangelina Olivarez	(Indonesia) Veronica Widyadharma ?
1995	Chiang Mai	(Thailand) Tamarine Tanasugarn	(Malaysia) Khoo Chin-bee	(Indonesia) Romana Tedjakusuma (Indonesia) Mimma Chernovita
1997	Jakarta	(Indonesia) Wukirasih Sawondari	(Thailand) Tamarine Tanasugarn	(Indonesia) Wynne Prakusya (Malaysia) Khoo Chin-bee
1999	Bandar Seri Begawan	(Philippines) Maricris Fernandez	(Indonesia) Wynne Prakusya	(Malaysia) Khoo Chin-bee (Thailand) Orawan Wongkamalasai
2001	Kuala Lumpur	(Indonesia) Romana Tedjakusuma	(Indonesia) Wynne Prakusya	(Malaysia) Khoo Chin-bee (Thailand) Suchanun Viratprasert
2003	Ho Chi Minh City	(Thailand) Suchanun Viratprasert	(Thailand) Napaporn Tongsalee	(Indonesia) Septi Mende (Indonesia) Sandy Gumulya
2005	Manila	(Indonesia) Wynne Prakusya	(Indonesia) Romana Tedjakusuma	(Thailand) Napaporn Tongsalee (Thailand) Suchanun Viratprasert
2007	Nakhon Ratchasima	(Indonesia) Sandy Gumulya	(Thailand) Nudnida Luangnam	(Indonesia) Romana Tedjakusuma (Thailand) Noppawan Lertcheewakarn
2009	Vientiane	(Indonesia) Lavinia Tananta	(Indonesia) Ayu Fani Damayanti	(Philippines) Denise Dy (Philippines) Riza Zalameda
2011	Palembang	(Indonesia) Ayu Fani Damayanti	(Thailand) Noppawan Lertcheewakarn	(Philippines) Anna Clarice Patrimonio (Thailand) Nicha Lertpitaksinchai
2013	Naypyidaw	no competition - Myanmar, the host country, dropped tennis due to the host’s lack of athletes and inability to provide facilities.		
2015	Singapore	(Thailand) Noppawan Lertcheewakarn	(Thailand) Varatchaya Wongteanchai	(Philippines) Katharina Lehnert (Indonesia) Lavinia Tananta
2017	Kuala Lumpur	(Thailand) Luksika Kumkhum	(Philippines) Anna Clarice Patrimonio	(Singapore) Stefanie Tan (Cambodia) Andrea Ka
2019	Manila	(Indonesia) Aldila Sutjiadi	(Vietnam) Savanna Ly-Nguyen	(Indonesia) Priska Madelyn Nugroho (Thailand) Anchisa Chanta
2021	Bắc Ninh	(Thailand) Luksika Kumkhum	(Thailand) Anchisa Chanta	(Philippines) Alexandra Eala (Vietnam) Chanelle Van Nguyen
2023	Phnom Penh	(Indonesia) Priska Madelyn Nugroho	(Thailand) Lanlana Tararudee	(Vietnam) Savanna Ly-Nguyen (Thailand) Anchisa Chanta
2025	Nonthaburi	(Philippines) Alexandra Eala	(Thailand) Mananchaya Sawangkaew	(Thailand) Thasaporn Naklo (Indonesia) Janice Tjen

==== Women's doubles ====
Year	Location	Gold	Silver	Bronze
1959	Bangkok			
1961	Yangon			
1965	Kuala Lumpur			
1967	Bangkok			
1969	Yangon			
1971	Kuala Lumpur			
1973	Singapore	(Malaysia) Radhika Menoon (Malaysia) Lim Kheow Suan	(Thailand) Sida Schmidt (Thailand) Chalatip Phintanon	(Thailand) Suthasinee Sirikaya; Rachaniwan Homsukon (Malaysia) Anna Tie; Zaiton Sulaiman
1975	Bangkok			
1977	Kuala Lumpur	(Thailand) Suthasini Sirikaya and Srikanya Hoonsiri	(Indonesia) Lita Liem Sugiarto and Lany Lumananauw	(Indonesia) Yolanda Soemarno and Ayi Sutarno
1979	Jakarta	(Philippines) Pia Tamayo and Gladys Imperial	(Thailand) Suthasini Sirikaya and Chalada Chanmareong	(Indonesia) Yolanda Soemarno and Lita Liem Sugiarto
1981	Manila	(Thailand) Ponamporn Choochom and Srikanya Hoonsiri	(Indonesia) Suzanna Anggarkusuma and Sri Utaminingsih	(Thailand) Chalada Chanmareong and Chanida Nakpitag
1983	Singapore	(Thailand) Chongrak Sri-Ud and Weena Maneesai	(Thailand) Srikanya Hoonsiri and Chalada Chanmareong	(Indonesia) Cony Maramis and Tutut Nugroho
1985	Bangkok	(Thailand) Ponamporn Samawanthana and Chongrak Sri-Ud	(Thailand) Tossaporn Summa and Sakolwan Kacharoen	(Philippines) Dyan Castillejo and Jennifer Saberon
1985	Bangkok	(Thailand) Ponamporn Samawanthana and Chongrak Sri-Ud	(Thailand) Tossaporn Summa and Sakolwan Kacharoen	(Indonesia) Sri Utaminingsih and Lukky Tedjamukti
1987	Jakarta	(Indonesia) Suzanna Anggarkusuma and Yayuk Basuki	(Philippines) Dyan Castillejo and Nina Castillejo	(Indonesia) Tanya Soemarno and Agustina Wibisono
1989	Kuala Lumpur	(Indonesia) Waya Walalangi and Lukky Tedjamukti	(Indonesia) Suzanna Anggarkusuma and Yayuk Basuki	(Thailand) Orawan Thampensri and Chanrisa Rareang
1991	Manila	(Indonesia) Lukky Tedjamukti and Irawati Moerid	(Indonesia) Joice Sutedja and Tanya Soemarno	(Philippines) Jennifer Saberon and Jennifer Saret
1993	Singapore	(Philippines) Evangelina Olivarez and Francesca La'O	(Thailand) Sirilux Mingmolee and Benjamas Sangaram	(Indonesia) Romana Tedjakusuma and Natalia Soetrisno
1993	Singapore	(Philippines) Evangelina Olivarez and Francesca La'O	(Thailand) Sirilux Mingmolee and Benjamas Sangaram	(Philippines) Jean Lozano and Jennifer Saret
1995	Chiang Mai	(Indonesia) Yayuk Basuki and Romana Tedjakusuma	(Thailand) Tamarine Tanasugarn and Suvimol Duangchan	(Indonesia) Mimma Chernovita and Veronica Widyadharma
1995	Chiang Mai	(Indonesia) Yayuk Basuki and Romana Tedjakusuma	(Thailand) Tamarine Tanasugarn and Suvimol Duangchan	(Philippines) Jennifer Saret and Maricris Fernandez
1997	Jakarta	(Indonesia) Wynne Prakusya and Liza Andriyani	(Thailand) Tamarine Tanasugarn and Benjamas Sangaram	(Indonesia) Wukirasih Sawondari and Irawati Moerid
1997	Jakarta	(Indonesia) Wynne Prakusya and Liza Andriyani	(Thailand) Tamarine Tanasugarn and Benjamas Sangaram	(Thailand) Suvimol Duangchan and Marissa Niroj
1999	Bandar Seri Begawan	(Indonesia) Wynne Prakusya and Romana Tedjakusuma	(Indonesia) Liza Andriyani and Wukirasih Sawondari	(Thailand) Orawan Wongkamalasai and Monthika Anuchan
1999	Bandar Seri Begawan	(Indonesia) Wynne Prakusya and Romana Tedjakusuma	(Indonesia) Liza Andriyani and Wukirasih Sawondari	(Thailand) Napaporn Tongsalee and Suchanun Viratprasert
2001	Kuala Lumpur	(Indonesia) Yayuk Basuki and Wynne Prakusya	(Indonesia) Romana Tedjakusuma and Angelique Widjaja	(Thailand) Orawan Lamanthong and Chattida Thimjapo
2001	Kuala Lumpur	(Indonesia) Yayuk Basuki and Wynne Prakusya	(Indonesia) Romana Tedjakusuma and Angelique Widjaja	(Thailand) Napaporn Tongsalee and Suchanun Viratprasert
2003	Ho Chi Minh City	(Indonesia) Wynne Prakusya and Maya Rosa	(Thailand) Napaporn Tongsalee and Suchanun Viratprasert	(Indonesia) Sandy Gumulya and Septi Mende
2003	Ho Chi Minh City	(Indonesia) Wynne Prakusya and Maya Rosa	(Thailand) Napaporn Tongsalee and Suchanun Viratprasert	(Thailand) Wilawan Choptang and Chattida Thimjapo
2005	Manila	(Indonesia) Wynne Prakusya and Romana Tedjakusuma	(Indonesia) Ayu Fani Damayanti and Septi Mende	(Philippines) Denise Dy and Riza Zalameda
2005	Manila	(Indonesia) Wynne Prakusya and Romana Tedjakusuma	(Indonesia) Ayu Fani Damayanti and Septi Mende	(Thailand) Montinee Tangphong and Thassha Vitayaviroj
2007	Nakhon Ratchasima	(Thailand) Tamarine Tanasugarn and Napaporn Tongsalee	(Indonesia) Sandy Gumulya and Romana Tedjakusuma	(Philippines) Denise Dy and Dianne Matias
2007	Nakhon Ratchasima	(Thailand) Tamarine Tanasugarn and Napaporn Tongsalee	(Indonesia) Sandy Gumulya and Romana Tedjakusuma	(Thailand) Suchanun Viratprasert and Nungnadda Wannasuk
2009	Vientiane	(Thailand) Tamarine Tanasugarn and Varatchaya Wongteanchai	(Philippines) Denise Dy and Riza Zalameda	(Indonesia) Sandy Gumulya and Jessy Rompies
2009	Vientiane	(Thailand) Tamarine Tanasugarn and Varatchaya Wongteanchai	(Philippines) Denise Dy and Riza Zalameda	(Thailand) Nudnida Luangnam and Suchanun Viratprasert
2011	Palembang	(Thailand) Noppawan Lertcheewakarn and Nungnadda Wannasuk	(Thailand) Nicha Lertpitaksinchai and Varatchaya Wongteanchai	(Indonesia) Ayu Fani Damayanti and Jessy Rompies
2011	Palembang	(Thailand) Noppawan Lertcheewakarn and Nungnadda Wannasuk	(Thailand) Nicha Lertpitaksinchai and Varatchaya Wongteanchai	(Vietnam) Huỳnh Phương Đài Trang and Tran Thi Tam Hao
2013	Naypyidaw	no competition - Myanmar, the host country, dropped tennis due to the host’s lack of athletes and inability to provide facilities.		
2015	Singapore	(Thailand) Noppawan Lertcheewakarn and Varatchaya Wongteanchai	(Philippines) Denise Dy and Katharina Lehnert	(Thailand) Peangtarn Plipuech and Tamarine Tanasugarn
2015	Singapore	(Thailand) Noppawan Lertcheewakarn and Varatchaya Wongteanchai	(Philippines) Denise Dy and Katharina Lehnert	(Indonesia) Jessy Rompies and Aldila Sutjiadi
2017	Kuala Lumpur	(Thailand) Nicha Lertpitaksinchai and Peangtarn Plipuech	(Thailand) Luksika Kumkhum and Noppawan Lertcheewakarn	(Malaysia) Jawairiah Noordin and Theiviya Selvarajoo
2017	Kuala Lumpur	(Thailand) Nicha Lertpitaksinchai and Peangtarn Plipuech	(Thailand) Luksika Kumkhum and Noppawan Lertcheewakarn	(Philippines) Denise Dy and Katharina Lehnert
2019	Manila	(Indonesia) Jessy Rompies and Beatrice Gumulya	(Thailand) Tamarine Tanasugarn and Peangtarn Plipuech	(Vietnam) Phan Thi Thanh Binh and Tran Thuy Thanh Truc
2019	Manila	(Indonesia) Jessy Rompies and Beatrice Gumulya	(Thailand) Tamarine Tanasugarn and Peangtarn Plipuech	(Thailand) Patcharin Cheapchandej and Luksika Kumkhum
2021	Hanoi	(Thailand) Anchisa Chanta and Patcharin Cheapchandej	(Thailand) Pimrada Jattavapornvanit and Lanlana Tararudee	(Indonesia) Beatrice Gumulya and Jessy Rompies
2021	Hanoi	(Thailand) Anchisa Chanta and Patcharin Cheapchandej	(Thailand) Pimrada Jattavapornvanit and Lanlana Tararudee	(Malaysia) Jawairiah Noordin and Sharifah Elysia Wan Abdul Rahman
2023	Phnom Penh	(Thailand) Luksika Kumkhum and Peangtarn Plipuech	(Indonesia) Jessy Rompies and Aldila Sutjiadi	(Indonesia) Beatrice Gumulya and Fitriana Sabrina
2023	Phnom Penh	(Thailand) Luksika Kumkhum and Peangtarn Plipuech	(Indonesia) Jessy Rompies and Aldila Sutjiadi	(Thailand) Lanlana Tararudee and Punnin Kovapitukted
2025	Nonthaburi	(Indonesia); Aldila Sutjiadi; Janice Tjen	(Thailand); Mananchaya Sawangkaew; Peangtarn Plipuech	(Indonesia); Priska Madelyn Nugroho; Anjali Kirana Junarto
2025	Nonthaburi	(Indonesia); Aldila Sutjiadi; Janice Tjen	(Thailand); Mananchaya Sawangkaew; Peangtarn Plipuech	(Philippines); Tennielle Madis; Stefi Martithe Aludo

==== Women's team ====
Year	Location	Gold	Silver	Bronze
1959	Bangkok			
1961	Yangon			
1965	Kuala Lumpur			
1967	Bangkok			
1969	Yangon			
1971	Kuala Lumpur			South Vietnam (VNM)
1973	Singapore			Singapore (SIN)
1975	Bangkok			
1977	Kuala Lumpur	Indonesia (INA); Lany Lumanauw; Lita Liem Sugiarto; Yolanda Soemarno; Ayi Sutarno	Thailand (THA); Ponamporn Choochom; Srikanya Hoonsiri; Suthasini Sirikaya; Sida Schmidt	Philippines (PHI); Ruby Chiongbian; Gladys Imperial; Marisa Sanchez; Pia Tamayo
1979	Jakarta	Indonesia (INA); Loanita Rachman; Lita Liem Sugiarto; Yolanda Soemarno; Elvia Tarik	Malaysia (MAS); Evelene Lim	Philippines (PHI); Gladys Imperial; Pia Tamayo
1981	Manila	Indonesia (INA); Suzanna Anggarkusuma; Lita Liem Sugiarto; Yolanda Soemarno; Sri Utaminingsih	Philippines (PHI); Dyan Castillejo; Gladys Imperial; Marisa Sanchez; Pia Tamayo	Thailand (THA); Chalada Chanmareong; Ponamporn Choochom; Srikanya Hoonsiri; Chanida Nakpitag
1983	Singapore	Indonesia (INA); Suzanna Anggarkusuma; Cony Maramis; Tutut Nugroho; Sri Utaminingsih	Thailand (THA); Chalada Chanmareong; Srikanya Hoonsiri; Weena Maneesai; Chongrak Sri-Ud	Philippines (PHI); Dyan Castillejo; Jackie Castillejo; Jeannette Gomez; Edna Olivarez
1985	Bangkok	Indonesia (INA); Suzanna Anggarkusuma; Yayuk Basuki; Lukky Tedjamukti; Sri Utaminingsih	Thailand (THA); Sakolwan Kacharoen; Ponamporn Samawanthana; Chongrak Sri-Ud; Tossaporn Summa	Philippines (PHI); Dyan Castillejo; Jennifer Saberon
1987	Jakarta	Indonesia (INA); Suzanna Anggarkusuma; Yayuk Basuki; Tania Sumarno; Agustina Wibisono	Thailand (THA); Sakolwan Kacharoen; Roongnapha Surachet; Orawan Thampensri	Philippines (PHI); Dyan Castillejo; Nina Castillejo; Sarah Rafael; Jennifer Saberon
1989	Kuala Lumpur	Indonesia (INA); Suzanna Anggarkusuma; Yayuk Basuki; Lukky Tedjamukti; Waya Walalangi	Thailand (THA); Sakolwan Kacharoen; Chanrisa Rareang; Tossaporn Summa; Orawan Thampensri	Philippines (PHI); Nina Castillejo; Sarah Castillejo; Jennifer Saret; Dorothy Jane Suarez
1991	Manila	Indonesia (INA); Lukky Tedjamukti; Irawati Moerid; Joice Sutedja; Tanya Soemarno	Philippines (PHI); Joanna Feria; Francesca La'O; Jennifer Saberon; Jennifer Saret	Thailand (THA); Suvimol Duangchan; Nipada Kaewborisut; Apichaya Khunpitak; Benjamas Sangaram
1993	Singapore	Indonesia (INA); Romana Tedjakusuma; Natalia Soetrisno; Veronica Widyadharma	Philippines (PHI); Francesca La'O; Jean Lozano; Evangelina Olivarez; Jennifer Saret	Thailand (THA); Sirilux Mingmolee; Benjamas Sangaram
1995	Chiang Mai	Indonesia (INA); Yayuk Basuki; Mimma Chernovita; Romana Tedjakusuma; Veronica Widyadharma	Thailand (THA); Suvimol Duangchan; Tamarine Tanasugarn	Malaysia (MAS); Khoo Chin-bee
1995	Chiang Mai	Indonesia (INA); Yayuk Basuki; Mimma Chernovita; Romana Tedjakusuma; Veronica Widyadharma	Thailand (THA); Suvimol Duangchan; Tamarine Tanasugarn	Philippines (PHI); Maricris Fernandez; Jennifer Saret
1997	Jakarta	Indonesia (INA); Liza Andriyani; Irawati Moerid; Wynne Prakusya; Wukirasih Sawondari	Thailand (THA); Suvimol Duangchan; Marissa Niroj; Benjamas Sangaram; Tamarine Tanasugarn	Philippines (PHI); Maricris Fernandez; Pamela Floro; Marisue Jacutin; Jennifer Saret
1997	Jakarta	Indonesia (INA); Liza Andriyani; Irawati Moerid; Wynne Prakusya; Wukirasih Sawondari	Thailand (THA); Suvimol Duangchan; Marissa Niroj; Benjamas Sangaram; Tamarine Tanasugarn	Malaysia (MAS); Khoo Chin-bee; Tan Lynn Yin
1999	Bandar Seri Begawan	Indonesia (INA); Liza Andriyani; Wynne Prakusya; Wukirasih Sawondari; Romana Tedjakusuma	Philippines (PHI); Czarina Arevalo; Maricris Fernandez; Pamela Floro; Marisue Jacutin	Thailand (THA); Monthika Anuchan; Napaporn Tongsalee; Suchanun Viratprasert; Orawan Wongkamalasai
1999	Bandar Seri Begawan	Indonesia (INA); Liza Andriyani; Wynne Prakusya; Wukirasih Sawondari; Romana Tedjakusuma	Philippines (PHI); Czarina Arevalo; Maricris Fernandez; Pamela Floro; Marisue Jacutin	Malaysia (MAS); Chiew Eline; Khoo Chin-bee; Lai Shareen; Tan Lynn Yin
2001	Kuala Lumpur	Indonesia; Wynne Prakusya; Romana Tedjakusuma; Yayuk Basuki; Angelique Widjaja	Malaysia; Khoo Chin-bee; Tan Lynn Yin; Liaw Chen Yee	Thailand; Suchanun Viratprasert; Napaporn Tongsalee; Orawan Lamanthong; Chattida Thimjapo
2001	Kuala Lumpur	Indonesia; Wynne Prakusya; Romana Tedjakusuma; Yayuk Basuki; Angelique Widjaja	Malaysia; Khoo Chin-bee; Tan Lynn Yin; Liaw Chen Yee	Philippines; Czarina Arevalo; Jennifer Saret; Kara Guzman
2003	Ho Chi Minh City	Thailand; Suchanun Viratprasert; Napaporn Tongsalee; Wilawan Choptang; Chattida Thimjapo	Indonesia; Wynne Prakusya; Sandy Gumulya; Maya Rosa; Septi Mende	Philippines; Czarina Arevalo; Anna Patricia Santos; Alyssa Anne Labay
2003	Ho Chi Minh City	Thailand; Suchanun Viratprasert; Napaporn Tongsalee; Wilawan Choptang; Chattida Thimjapo	Indonesia; Wynne Prakusya; Sandy Gumulya; Maya Rosa; Septi Mende	Vietnam; Tran Kim Loi; Nguyen Thuy Dung; Huynh Mai Huynh; Phan Nhu Quynh
2005	Manila	Indonesia; Wynne Prakusya; Romana Tedjakusuma; Ayu Fani Damayanti; Septi Mende	Thailand; Suchanun Viratprasert; Napaporn Tongsalee; Montinee Tangphong; Thassha Vitayaviroj	Philippines; Riza Zalameda; Czarina Arevalo; Denise Dy
2005	Manila	Indonesia; Wynne Prakusya; Romana Tedjakusuma; Ayu Fani Damayanti; Septi Mende	Thailand; Suchanun Viratprasert; Napaporn Tongsalee; Montinee Tangphong; Thassha Vitayaviroj	Vietnam; Ha Ngo Viet; Tran Kim Loi; Nguyen Thuy Dung; Huynh Mai Huynh
2007	Nakhon Ratchasima	Thailand; Tamarine Tanasugarn; Suchanun Viratprasert; Nudnida Luangnam; Napaporn Tongsalee	Indonesia; Sandy Gumulya; Romana Tedjakusuma; Wynne Prakusya; Angelique Widjaja	Malaysia; Sia Huey Teng; Dorothy Chong; Chellapriya Vythinathan; Jawairiah Noordin
2007	Nakhon Ratchasima	Thailand; Tamarine Tanasugarn; Suchanun Viratprasert; Nudnida Luangnam; Napaporn Tongsalee	Indonesia; Sandy Gumulya; Romana Tedjakusuma; Wynne Prakusya; Angelique Widjaja	Philippines; Czarina Arevalo; Denise Dy; Dianne Matias; Michelle Pang
2009	Vientiane	Thailand; Tamarine Tanasugarn; Suchanun Viratprasert; Nudnida Luangnam; Varatchaya Wongteanchai	Indonesia; Ayu Fani Damayanti; Lavinia Tananta; Sandy Gumulya; Jessy Rompies	Malaysia; Jawairiah Noordin; Neesha Thirumalaichelvam; Adelle Boey; Choo Lyn Yee
2009	Vientiane	Thailand; Tamarine Tanasugarn; Suchanun Viratprasert; Nudnida Luangnam; Varatchaya Wongteanchai	Indonesia; Ayu Fani Damayanti; Lavinia Tananta; Sandy Gumulya; Jessy Rompies	Philippines; Riza Zalameda; Denise Dy; Marichris Gentz
2011	Palembang	Thailand; Noppawan Lertcheewakarn; Nungnadda Wannasuk; Nicha Lertpitaksinchai; Varatchaya Wongteanchai	Indonesia; Ayu Fani Damayanti; Lavinia Tananta; Grace Sari Ysidora; Jessy Rompies	Vietnam; Tran Lam Anh; Huỳnh Phương Đài Trang; Phan Thi Thanh Binh
2011	Palembang	Thailand; Noppawan Lertcheewakarn; Nungnadda Wannasuk; Nicha Lertpitaksinchai; Varatchaya Wongteanchai	Indonesia; Ayu Fani Damayanti; Lavinia Tananta; Grace Sari Ysidora; Jessy Rompies	Philippines; Anna Clarice Patrimonio; Denise Dy; Marian Capadocia
2013	Naypyidaw	no competition - Myanmar, the host country, dropped tennis due to the host’s lack of athletes and inability to provide facilities.		
2015	Singapore	Thailand; Luksika Kumkhum; Noppawan Lertcheewakarn; Tamarine Tanasugarn; Varatchaya Wongteanchai	Philippines; Denise Dy; Khim Iglupas; Katharina Lehnert; Anna Clarice Patrimonio	Malaysia; Jawairiah Noordin; Theiviya Selvarajoo; Yus Syazlin Yusri
2015	Singapore	Thailand; Luksika Kumkhum; Noppawan Lertcheewakarn; Tamarine Tanasugarn; Varatchaya Wongteanchai	Philippines; Denise Dy; Khim Iglupas; Katharina Lehnert; Anna Clarice Patrimonio	Indonesia; Jessy Rompies; Lavinia Tananta; Ayu Fani Damayanti; Aldila Sutjiadi
2017	Kuala Lumpur	not held		
2019	Manila	not held		
2021	Hanoi	Thailand; Patcharin Cheapchandej; Luksika Kumkhum; Pimrada Jattavapornvanit; Anchisa Chanta	Vietnam; Chanelle Vân Nguyễn; Savanna Ly-Nguyen; Trần Thụy Thanh Trúc; Csilla Fodor	Indonesia; Aldila Sutjiadi; Beatrice Gumulya; Jessy Rompies; Novela Rezha Millenia Putri; Fitriani Sabatini
2021	Hanoi	Thailand; Patcharin Cheapchandej; Luksika Kumkhum; Pimrada Jattavapornvanit; Anchisa Chanta	Vietnam; Chanelle Vân Nguyễn; Savanna Ly-Nguyen; Trần Thụy Thanh Trúc; Csilla Fodor	Philippines; Alex Eala; Shaira Hope Rivera; Marian Capadocia; Jenaila Rose Prulla
2023	Phnom Penh	Indonesia; Aldila Sutjiadi; Beatrice Gumulya; Jessy Rompies; Priska Madelyn Nugroho	Thailand; Anchisa Chanta; Luksika Kumkhum; Peangtarn Plipuech; Lanlana Tararudee	Cambodia; Andrea Ka; Grace Krusling; Chenda Som
2023	Phnom Penh	Indonesia; Aldila Sutjiadi; Beatrice Gumulya; Jessy Rompies; Priska Madelyn Nugroho	Thailand; Anchisa Chanta; Luksika Kumkhum; Peangtarn Plipuech; Lanlana Tararudee	Vietnam; Savanna Ly-Nguyen; Phạm Đình Quỳnh; Sĩ Bội Ngọc
2025	Nonthaburi	Indonesia; Aldila Sutjiadi; Anjali Kirana Junarto; Janice Tjen; Meydiana Laviola Reinnamah; Priska Madelyn Nugroho	Thailand; Lanlana Tararudee; Mananchaya Sawangkaew; Patcharin Cheapchandej; Peangtarn Plipuech; Thasaporn Naklo	Philippines; Alexandra Eala; Alexa Joy Milliam; Shaira Hope Rivera; Stefi Martithe Aludo; Tennielle Madis
2025	Nonthaburi	Indonesia; Aldila Sutjiadi; Anjali Kirana Junarto; Janice Tjen; Meydiana Laviola Reinnamah; Priska Madelyn Nugroho	Thailand; Lanlana Tararudee; Mananchaya Sawangkaew; Patcharin Cheapchandej; Peangtarn Plipuech; Thasaporn Naklo	Malaysia; Daania Danielle Abd Hazli; Hannah Seen Ean Yip; Sharifah Elsa Wan Abd Rahman; Shihomi Li Xuan Leong; Zan Ning Lim

=== Mixed doubles ===
Year	Location	Gold	Silver	Bronze
1959	Bangkok			
1961	Yangon			
1965	Kuala Lumpur			
1967	Bangkok			
1969	Yangon			
1971	Kuala Lumpur			(South Vietnam) Nguyễn Thị Thìn and Lý Aline
1973	Singapore			(South Vietnam) Nguyễn Thị Thìn and Trần Duy Bản
1975	Bangkok			
1977	Kuala Lumpur	(Indonesia) Gondo Widjojo and Lita Liem Sugiarto	(Indonesia) Hadiman and Ayi Sutarno	(Thailand) Prasert Kaimarn and Srikanya Hoonsiri
1979	Jakarta	(Indonesia) Gondo Widjojo and Lita Liem Sugiarto	(Indonesia) Hadiman and Yolanda Soemarno	(Philippines) Manuel Valleramos and Pia Tamayo
1981	Manila	(Philippines) Alexander Marcial and Pia Tamayo	(Indonesia) Atet Wijono and Lita Liem Sugiarto	(Indonesia) Hadiman and Suzanna Anggarkusuma
1983	Singapore	(Indonesia) Hadiman and Sri Utaminingsih	(Indonesia) Tintus Arianto Wibowo and Suzanna Anggarkusuma	(Thailand) Suthorn Klaharn and Chalada Chanmareong
1985	Bangkok	(Indonesia) Tintus Arianto Wibowo and Suzanna Anggarkusuma	(Philippines) Rod Rafael and Jennifer Saberon	(Thailand) Thanakorn Srichaphan and Ponamporn Samawanthana
1985	Bangkok	(Indonesia) Tintus Arianto Wibowo and Suzanna Anggarkusuma	(Philippines) Rod Rafael and Jennifer Saberon	(Indonesia) Sulistyono and Sri Utaminingsih
1987	Jakarta	(Indonesia) Suharyadi and Agustina Wibisono	(Philippines) Rod Rafael and Jennifer Saberon	(Philippines) Raymundo Suarez and Dyan Castillejo
1989	Kuala Lumpur	(Thailand) Thanakorn Srichaphan and Sakolwan Kacharoen	(Thailand) Vittaya Samrej and Tossaporn Summa	(Indonesia) Tintus Arianto Wibowo and Suzanna Anggarkusuma
1991	Manila	(Philippines) Felix Barrientos and Jennifer Saberon	(Indonesia) Bonit Wiryawan and Irawati Moerid	(Philippines) Roland So and Jennifer Saret
1993	Singapore	(Philippines) Felix Barrientos and Jean Lozano	(Philippines) Sofronio Palahang and Jennifer Saret	(Indonesia) Donny Susetyo and Romana Tedjakusuma
1993	Singapore	(Philippines) Felix Barrientos and Jean Lozano	(Philippines) Sofronio Palahang and Jennifer Saret	(Indonesia) Teddy Tandjung and Natalia Soetrisno
1995	Chiang Mai	(Indonesia) Sulistyo Wibowo and Yayuk Basuki	(Indonesia) Bonit Wiryawan and Romana Tedjakusuma	(Thailand) Thanakorn Srichaphan and Tamarine Tanasugarn
1995	Chiang Mai	(Indonesia) Sulistyo Wibowo and Yayuk Basuki	(Indonesia) Bonit Wiryawan and Romana Tedjakusuma	(Vietnam) Ôn Tấn Lực and Thi Kim Trang
1997	Jakarta	(Thailand) Narathorn Srichaphan and Benjamas Sangaram	(Vietnam) Ôn Tấn Lực and Nguyen Trang Thi Kim	(Indonesia) Bonit Wiryawan and Irawati Moerid
1997	Jakarta	(Thailand) Narathorn Srichaphan and Benjamas Sangaram	(Vietnam) Ôn Tấn Lực and Nguyen Trang Thi Kim	(Indonesia) Sulistyo Wibowo and Liza Andriyani
1999	Bandar Seri Begawan	(Thailand) Vittaya Samrej and Orawan Wongkamalasai	(Thailand) Narathorn Srichaphan and Monthika Anuchan	(Indonesia) Suwandi and Wukirasih Sawondari
1999	Bandar Seri Begawan	(Thailand) Vittaya Samrej and Orawan Wongkamalasai	(Thailand) Narathorn Srichaphan and Monthika Anuchan	(Indonesia) Hendri Susilo Pramono and Liza Andriyani
2001	Kuala Lumpur	(Indonesia) Bonit Wiryawan and Angelique Widjaja	(Indonesia) Suwandi and Yayuk Basuki	(Thailand) Vittaya Samrej and Chattida Thimjapo
2001	Kuala Lumpur	(Indonesia) Bonit Wiryawan and Angelique Widjaja	(Indonesia) Suwandi and Yayuk Basuki	(Malaysia) V. Selvam and Khoo Chin-bee
2003	Ho Chi Minh City	(Indonesia) Suwandi and Wynne Prakusya	(Indonesia) Hendri Susilo Pramono and Maya Rosa	(Malaysia) Si Yew Ming and Khoo Chin-bee
2003	Ho Chi Minh City	(Indonesia) Suwandi and Wynne Prakusya	(Indonesia) Hendri Susilo Pramono and Maya Rosa	(Thailand) Sonchat Ratiwatana and Chattida Thimjapo
2005	Manila	(Philippines) Cecil Mamiit and Riza Zalameda	(Indonesia) Suwandi and Wynne Prakusya	(Thailand) Sanchai Ratiwatana and Montinee Tangphong
2005	Manila	(Philippines) Cecil Mamiit and Riza Zalameda	(Indonesia) Suwandi and Wynne Prakusya	(Thailand) Sonchat Ratiwatana and Napaporn Tongsalee
2007	Nakhon Ratchasima	(Thailand) Sanchai Ratiwatana and Napaporn Tongsalee	(Philippines) Cecil Mamiit and Denise Dy	(Philippines) Eric Taino and Dianne Matias
2007	Nakhon Ratchasima	(Thailand) Sanchai Ratiwatana and Napaporn Tongsalee	(Philippines) Cecil Mamiit and Denise Dy	(Thailand) Sonchat Ratiwatana and Tamarine Tanasugarn
2009	Vientiane	(Thailand) Sonchat Ratiwatana and Varatchaya Wongteanchai	(Thailand) Sanchai Ratiwatana and Tamarine Tanasugarn	(Philippines) Cecil Mamiit and Denise Dy
2009	Vientiane	(Thailand) Sonchat Ratiwatana and Varatchaya Wongteanchai	(Thailand) Sanchai Ratiwatana and Tamarine Tanasugarn	(Philippines) Treat Huey and Riza Zalameda
2011	Palembang	(Philippines) Denise Dy and Treat Huey	(Indonesia) Jessy Rompies and Christopher Rungkat	(Indonesia) Grace Sari Ysidora and Aditya Hari Sasongko
2011	Palembang	(Philippines) Denise Dy and Treat Huey	(Indonesia) Jessy Rompies and Christopher Rungkat	(Thailand) Nungnadda Wannasuk and Sanchai Ratiwatana
2013	Naypyidaw	no competition - Myanmar, the host country, dropped tennis due to the host’s lack of athletes and inability to provide facilities.		
2015	Singapore	(Philippines) Denise Dy and Treat Huey	(Thailand) Peangtarn Plipuech and Sonchat Ratiwatana	(Indonesia) Jessy Rompies and Sunu Wahyu Trijati
2015	Singapore	(Philippines) Denise Dy and Treat Huey	(Thailand) Peangtarn Plipuech and Sonchat Ratiwatana	(Thailand) Tamarine Tanasugarn and Sanchai Ratiwatana
2017	Kuala Lumpur	(Thailand) Nicha Lertpitaksinchai and Sanchai Ratiwatana	(Indonesia) Jessy Rompies and Christopher Rungkat	(Thailand) Peangtarn Plipuech and Sonchat Ratiwatana
2017	Kuala Lumpur	(Thailand) Nicha Lertpitaksinchai and Sanchai Ratiwatana	(Indonesia) Jessy Rompies and Christopher Rungkat	(Philippines) Denise Dy and Ruben Gonzales
2019	Manila	(Indonesia) Aldila Sutjiadi and Christopher Rungkat	(Thailand) Tamarine Tanasugarn and Sanchai Ratiwatana	(Indonesia) Beatrice Gumulya and David Agung Susanto
2019	Manila	(Indonesia) Aldila Sutjiadi and Christopher Rungkat	(Thailand) Tamarine Tanasugarn and Sanchai Ratiwatana	(Thailand) Patcharin Cheapchandej and Sonchat Ratiwatana
2021	Hanoi	(Indonesia) Aldila Sutjiadi; Christopher Rungkat	(Thailand); Patcharin Cheapchandej; Pruchya Isaro	(Philippines); Alex Eala; Treat Huey
2021	Hanoi	(Indonesia) Aldila Sutjiadi; Christopher Rungkat	(Thailand); Patcharin Cheapchandej; Pruchya Isaro	(Thailand); Luksika Kumkhum; Kasidit Samrej
2023	Phnom Penh	(Indonesia) Aldila Sutjiadi; Christopher Rungkat	(Thailand); Peangtarn Plipuech; Pruchya Isaro	(Indonesia); David Agung Susanto; Beatrice Gumulya
2023	Phnom Penh	(Indonesia) Aldila Sutjiadi; Christopher Rungkat	(Thailand); Peangtarn Plipuech; Pruchya Isaro	(Thailand); Thantub Suksumrarn; Luksika Kumkhum
2025	Nonthaburi	(Thailand); Pruchya Isaro; Peangtarn Plipuech	(Thailand); Patcharin Cheapchandej; Pawit Sornlaksup	(Indonesia); Christopher Rungkat; Aldila Sutjiadi
2025	Nonthaburi	(Thailand); Pruchya Isaro; Peangtarn Plipuech	(Thailand); Patcharin Cheapchandej; Pawit Sornlaksup	(Philippines); Alexandra Eala; Francis Alcantara
