= Tennis at the 1983 SEA Games =

Tennis at the 1983 SEA Games was held at Singapore Tennis Center, Singapore City, Singapore. Tennis events was held between 29 May to 5 June.

== Medal winners ==
Event	Gold	Silver	Bronze
Men's Singles	(Philippines) Manuel Valleramos	(Indonesia) Tintus Wibowo	(Thailand) Sombat Uamongkol
Men's Doubles	Thailand (THA); Sombat Uamongkol; Panomkorn Pladchurnil	Indonesia (INA); Tintus Wibowo; Yustedjo Tarik	Indonesia (INA); Hadiman; Donald Wailan-Walalangi
Women Singles	(Thailand) Jongkrak Sreud	(Singapore) Lim Phi-Lan	(Indonesia) Suzanna Anggarkusuma
Women's Doubles	Thailand (THA); Jongkrak Sreud; Weena Maneesai	Thailand (THA); Srikanya Honsiri; Cheladda Chanmareong	Indonesia (INA); Conny Maramis; Tutut Nugroho
Mix Doubles	Indonesia (INA); Hadiman; Sri Utaminingsih	Indonesia (INA); Tintus Wibowo; Suzanna Anggarkusuma	Thailand (THA); Suthorn Klaharn; Cheladda Chanmareong
Men's team	Indonesia (INA); Tintus Wibowo; Yustedjo Tarik; Donald Wailan-Walalangi; Hadiman	Philippines (PHI); Rudolf Gabriel; Alexander Marcial; Manuel Tolentino; Manuel Valleramos	Thailand (THA); Suthorn Klaharn; Supoj Meesawad; Panomkorn Pladchurnil; Sombat Uamongkol
Women's team	Indonesia (INA); Suzanna Anggarkusuma; Conny Maramis; Tutut Nugroho; Sri Utaminingsih	Thailand (THA); Srikanya Honsiri; Cheladda Chanmareong; Jongkrak Sreud; Weena Maneesai	Philippines (PHI); Dyan Castillejo; Jackie Castillejo; Jeannette Gomez; Edna Olivarez

== Medal table ==
Rank	Nation	Gold	Silver	Bronze	Total
1	Indonesia (INA)	3	3	3	9
2	Thailand (THA)	3	2	3	8
3	Philippines (PHI)	1	1	1	3
4	Singapore (SIN)	0	1	0	1
Totals (4 entries)		7	7	7	21
