= Sulistyono =

Indonesian tennis player

- Full name: Sulistyono Sulistyono
- Country (sports): Indonesia
- Born: 27 November 1964 (age 61)

Singles
- Career record: 1-1 (Davis Cup)
- Highest ranking: No. 727 (23 Nov 1987)

Doubles
- Career record: 1-1 (Davis Cup)
- Highest ranking: No. 597 (23 Nov 1987)
Medal record
Southeast Asian Games
Gold medal – first place	1985 Bangkok	Men's team
Silver medal – second place	1985 Bangkok	Men's doubles
Bronze medal – third place	1985 Bangkok	Mixed doubles
Asian Games
Bronze medal – third place	1986 Seoul	Men's doubles

Sulistyono Sulistyono (born 27 November 1964) is an Indonesian former professional tennis player.

Sulistyono played in the junior draw at the 1982 Wimbledon Championships and featured in the occasional professional tournament during the 1980s.

Both of Sulistyono's two appearances in Davis Cup ties came in the 1986 competition. Debuting in Indonesia's Eastern Zone round one win over the Philippines, he was beaten in the opening singles rubber by Rod Rafael, but partnered with Donald Wailan to win in the doubles, then won in the reverse singles against Roselle Natividad. In the quarter-finals, against Thailand in Bangkok, Sulistyono featured only in the doubles rubber, which he and Wailan lost to give the home side an unbeatable 3–0 lead.

In addition to the Davis Cup, Sulistyono also represented Indonesia in regional events. At the 1985 Southeast Asian Games, he won three medals, including a gold in the team event. He won a bronze medal at the 1986 Asian Games in Seoul, partnering Donald Wailan in the men's doubles.

== See also ==
- List of Indonesia Davis Cup team representatives
