= 1996 Davis Cup Asia/Oceania Zone Group II =

International tennis competition

The Asia/Oceania Zone was one of the three zones of the regional Davis Cup competition in 1996.

In the Asia/Oceania Zone there were three different tiers, called groups, in which teams compete against each other to advance to the upper tier. Winners in Group II advanced to the Asia/Oceania Zone Group I. Teams who lost their respective ties competed in the relegation play-offs, with winning teams remaining in Group II, whereas teams who lost their play-offs were relegated to the Asia/Oceania Zone Group III in 1997.

== Participating nations ==
- Bahrain
- Hong Kong
- Iran
- Pakistan
- Saudi Arabia
- Sri Lanka
- Thailand
- Uzbekistan

=== Draw ===
Relegation Play-offs
Tehran, Iran (clay)
Sri Lanka	1
Iran	4
Riyadh, Saudi Arabia (hard)
Saudi Arabia	3
Bahrain	2

First Round
Causeway Bay, Hong Kong (hard)
Hong Kong	5
Sri Lanka	0
Bangkok, Thailand (hard)
Thailand	4
Iran	1
Rawalpindi, Pakistan (clay)
Pakistan	5
Saudi Arabia	0
Manama, Bahrain (hard)
Bahrain	0
Uzbekistan	5

Second Round
Bangkok, Thailand (hard)
Hong Kong	0
Thailand	5
Peshawar, Pakistan (grass)
Pakistan	0
Uzbekistan	5

Third Round
Tashkent, Uzbekistan (clay)
Thailand	0
Uzbekistan	5

- Sri Lanka and Bahrain relegated to Group III in 1997.
- Uzbekistan promoted to Group I in 1997.

== First round ==
=== Hong Kong vs. Sri Lanka ===
Hong Kong
5
Victoria Park, Causeway Bay, Hong Kong
9–11 February 1996
Hard

Sri Lanka
0

			1	2	3	4	5
1	(Hong Kong) (Sri Lanka)	John Hui; Manjule Weerakoon	6; 3	6; 0	6; 2
2	(Hong Kong) (Sri Lanka)	Pang Lui; Jayendra Wijeyesekera	7; 5	6; 3	6; 3
3	(Hong Kong) (Sri Lanka)	John Hui / So Chun-yen; Lahiru Jayasuriya / Jayendra Wijeyesekera	6; 3	6; 4	6; 1
4	(Hong Kong) (Sri Lanka)	John Hui; Jayendra Wijeyesekera	6; 4	7^{7} 6^{5}
5	(Hong Kong) (Sri Lanka)	Pang Lui; Manjule Weerakoon	6; 0	6; 0

=== Thailand vs. Iran ===
Thailand
4
Huamark Centre, Bangkok, Thailand
9–11 February 1996
Hard

Iran
1

			1	2	3	4	5
1	(Thailand) (Iran)	Woraphol Thongkhamchu; Mansour Bahrami	6; 2	6; 4	6; 4
2	(Thailand) (Iran)	Tanakorn Srichaphan; Mohammed-Reza Tavakoli	6; 2	6; 1	6; 1
3	(Thailand) (Iran)	Vittaya Samrej / Narathorn Srichaphan; Mansour Bahrami / Ramin Raziani	7; 5	7^{7} 6^{4}	6; 3
4	(Thailand) (Iran)	Tanakorn Srichaphan; Mansour Bahrami	4; 6	2; 6
5	(Thailand) (Iran)	Woraphol Thongkhamchu; Ramin Raziani	7; 5	6; 4

=== Pakistan vs. Saudi Arabia ===
Pakistan
5
Artillery Mess, Rawalpindi, Pakistan
23–25 February 1996
Clay

Saudi Arabia
0

			1	2	3	4	5
1	(Pakistan) (Saudi Arabia)	Omer Rashid; Zulfiqar Ahmed	6; 0	6; 1	6; 1
2	(Pakistan) (Saudi Arabia)	Hamed-ul-Haq; Bader Mohammed Almuqail	6; 2	6; 0	6; 2
3	(Pakistan) (Saudi Arabia)	Omer Rashid / Hamed-ul-Haq; Bader Mohammed Almuqail / Farah Al-Somali	6; 3	6; 2	6; 0
4	(Pakistan) (Saudi Arabia)	Omer Rashid; Bader Mohammed Almuqail	6; 1	6; 3
5	(Pakistan) (Saudi Arabia)	Hamed-ul-Haq; Farah Al-Somali	6; 0	6; 0

=== Bahrain vs. Uzbekistan ===
Bahrain
0
Isa Town Stadium, Manama, Bahrain
23–25 February 1996
Hard

Uzbekistan
5

			1	2	3	4	5
1	(Bahrain) (Uzbekistan)	Esam Abdulaal; Dmitri Tomashevich	3; 6	5; 7	3; 6
2	(Bahrain) (Uzbekistan)	Shehab Shehab; Oleg Ogorodov	0; 6	1; 6	2; 6
3	(Bahrain) (Uzbekistan)	Esam Abdulaal / Nader Abdul-Aal; Vadim Kutsenko / Oleg Ogorodov	4; 6	1; 6	2; 6
4	(Bahrain) (Uzbekistan)	Esam Abdulaal; Oleg Ogorodov	5; 7	7^{7} 6^{2}	1; 6
5	(Bahrain) (Uzbekistan)	Shehab Shehab; Dmitri Tomashevich	2; 6	0; 6

== Second round ==
=== Thailand vs. Hong Kong ===
Thailand
5
National Centre, Bangkok, Thailand
5–7 April 1996
Hard

Hong Kong
0

			1	2	3	4	5
1	(Thailand) (Hong Kong)	Tanakorn Srichaphan; John Hui	6; 2	6; 2	6; 2
2	(Thailand) (Hong Kong)	Woraphol Thongkhamchu; Pang Lui	6; 3	6; 4	6; 3
3	(Thailand) (Hong Kong)	Vittaya Samrej / Narathorn Srichaphan; Graeme Foster / So Chun-yen	7; 5	6; 1	6; 3
4	(Thailand) (Hong Kong)	Narathorn Srichaphan; Graeme Foster	6; 0	6; 4
5	(Thailand) (Hong Kong)	Woraphol Thongkhamchu; John Hui	6; 3	6; 2

=== Pakistan vs. Uzbekistan ===
Pakistan
0
Peshawar Tennis Club, Peshawar, Pakistan
5–7 April 1996
Grass

Uzbekistan
5

			1	2	3	4	5
1	(Pakistan) (Uzbekistan)	Omer Rashid; Dmitri Tomashevich	3; 6	4; 6	1; 6
2	(Pakistan) (Uzbekistan)	Hamed-ul-Haq; Oleg Ogorodov	3; 6	6; 4	2; 6	3; 6
3	(Pakistan) (Uzbekistan)	Omer Rashid / Hamed-ul-Haq; Oleg Ogorodov / Dmitri Tomashevich	7^{7} 6^{4}	1; 6	6^{2} 7^{7}	3; 6
4	(Pakistan) (Uzbekistan)	Omer Rashid; Oleg Ogorodov	5; 7	1; 6
5	(Pakistan) (Uzbekistan)	Hamed-ul-Haq; Dmitri Tomashevich	3; 6	2; 6

== Relegation play-offs ==
=== Iran vs. Sri Lanka ===
Iran
4
Enghelab Sport Complex, Tehran, Iran
5–7 April 1996
Clay

Sri Lanka
1

			1	2	3	4	5
1	(Iran) (Sri Lanka)	Mansour Bahrami; Rohan de Silva	6; 2	6; 1	7; 5
2	(Iran) (Sri Lanka)	Mohammed-Reza Tavakoli; Jayendra Wijeyesekera	6; 2	6; 2	6; 2
3	(Iran) (Sri Lanka)	Mansour Bahrami / Ramin Raziani; Arjun Fernando / Jayendra Wijeyesekera	6; 4	6; 2	6; 4
4	(Iran) (Sri Lanka)	Ramin Raziani; Jayendra Wijeyesekera	4; 6	2; 6
5	(Iran) (Sri Lanka)	Mohammed-Reza Tavakoli; Rohan de Silva	6; 0	6; 2

=== Saudi Arabia vs. Bahrain ===
Saudi Arabia
3
InterContinental Hotel, Riyadh, Saudi Arabia
5–7 April 1996
Hard

Bahrain
2

			1	2	3	4	5
1	(Saudi Arabia) (Bahrain)	Bader Mohammed Almuqail; Shehab Shehab	6; 1	6; 2	6; 4
2	(Saudi Arabia) (Bahrain)	Othman Al-Anazi; Esam Abdulaal	1; 6	2; 6	7^{7} 6^{5}	6; 4	6; 4
3	(Saudi Arabia) (Bahrain)	Othman Al-Anazi / Bader Mohammed Almuqail; Esam Abdulaal / Nader Abdul-Aal	3; 6	4; 6	7; 5	3; 6
4	(Saudi Arabia) (Bahrain)	Bader Mohammed Almuqail; Esam Abdulaal	6; 4	2; 6	2; 6	5; 7
5	(Saudi Arabia) (Bahrain)	Othman Al-Anazi; Shehab Shehab	6; 4	7; 5	6; 3

== Third round ==
=== Uzbekistan vs. Thailand ===
Uzbekistan
5
Dynamo Tennis Club, Tashkent, Uzbekistan
20–22 September 1996
Clay

Thailand
0

			1	2	3	4	5
1	(Uzbekistan) (Thailand)	Dmitri Tomashevich; Narathorn Srichaphan	6; 0	6; 3	6; 1
2	(Uzbekistan) (Thailand)	Oleg Ogorodov; Tanakorn Srichaphan	6; 1	6; 3	7^{7} 6^{2}
3	(Uzbekistan) (Thailand)	Oleg Ogorodov / Dmitri Tomashevich; Vittaya Samrej / Woraphol Thongkhamchu	6; 3	6; 4	6; 2
4	(Uzbekistan) (Thailand)	Oleg Ogorodov; Narathorn Srichaphan	6; 3	5; 7	6; 3
5	(Uzbekistan) (Thailand)	Dmitri Tomashevich; Tanakorn Srichaphan	6; 0	6; 3
