= Tennis at the 1978 Asian Games =

- Dates: 10–19 December 1978

Tennis was contested at the 1978 Asian Games in Bangkok, Thailand from December 10 to December 19, 1978. Tennis had doubles and singles events for men and women, as well as a mixed doubles competition.

Indonesia dominated the competition, finishing first in medal table with 3 gold medals.

== Medalists ==
Event	Gold	Silver	Bronze
Men's singles	Atet Wijono; Indonesia	Shigeyuki Nishio; Japan	Tetsu Kuramitsu; Japan
Men's singles	Atet Wijono; Indonesia	Shigeyuki Nishio; Japan	Nadir Ali Khan; Pakistan
Men's doubles	Indonesia; Yustedjo Tarik; Hadiman	China; Xu Meilin; Gu Minghua	India; Shyam Minotra; Chiradip Mukerjea
Men's doubles	Indonesia; Yustedjo Tarik; Hadiman	China; Xu Meilin; Gu Minghua	Thailand; Pichet Boratisa; Charuek Hengrasmee
Men's team	Indonesia; Hadiman; Yustedjo Tarik; Gondo Widjojo; Atet Wijono	Pakistan; Jamil Ahmed; Nasir Munir Ahmed; Altaf Hussain; Nadir Ali Khan	China; Gu Minghua; Sun Chunlai; Wang Fuzhang; Xu Meilin
Men's team	Indonesia; Hadiman; Yustedjo Tarik; Gondo Widjojo; Atet Wijono	Pakistan; Jamil Ahmed; Nasir Munir Ahmed; Altaf Hussain; Nadir Ali Khan	Japan; Tetsu Kuramitsu; Shigeyuki Nishio; Etsuo Uchiyama
Women's singles	Lee Duk-hee; South Korea	Chen Juan; China	Kiyoko Nomura; Japan
Women's singles	Lee Duk-hee; South Korea	Chen Juan; China	Sonoe Yonezawa; Japan
Women's doubles	South Korea; Lee Duk-hee; Yang Jeong-soon	Japan; Kimiyo Hatanaka; Kiyoko Nomura	China; Chen Juan; Yu Liqiao
Women's doubles	South Korea; Lee Duk-hee; Yang Jeong-soon	Japan; Kimiyo Hatanaka; Kiyoko Nomura	Thailand; Suthasini Sirikaya; Sirikanya Hoonsiri
Women's team	Japan; Kimiyo Hatanaka; Matsuko Matsushima; Kiyoko Nomura; Sonoe Yonezawa	South Korea; Kim Nam-sook; Kim Soo-ok; Lee Duk-hee; Yang Jeong-soon	Indonesia; Lita Sugiarto; Yolanda Soemarno; Ayi Sutarno; Elvis Tarik
Mixed doubles	Thailand; Charuek Hengrasmee; Suthasini Sirikaya	Japan; Etsuo Uchiyama; Matsuko Matsushima	Indonesia; Hadiman; Ayi Sutarno
Mixed doubles	Thailand; Charuek Hengrasmee; Suthasini Sirikaya	Japan; Etsuo Uchiyama; Matsuko Matsushima	Japan; Shigeyuki Nishio; Kimiyo Hatanaka

== Medal table ==
Rank	Nation	Gold	Silver	Bronze	Total
1	Indonesia (INA)	3	0	2	5
2	South Korea (KOR)	2	1	0	3
3	Japan (JPN)	1	3	5	9
4	Thailand (THA)	1	0	2	3
5	China (CHN)	0	2	2	4
6	Pakistan (PAK)	0	1	1	2
7	India (IND)	0	0	1	1
Totals (7 entries)		7	7	13	27
