= Marissa Sanchez =

Filipino tennis player (1956–2026)

- Full name: Maria Socorro Dizon Sanchez
- Country (sports): Philippines
- Born: June 25, 1956
- Died: January 4, 2026 (aged 69) Angeles City, Philippines

Singles
- Career record: 2–5 (Federation Cup)

Doubles
- Career record: 0–4 (Federation Cup)
Medal record
SEA Games
Silver medal – second place	1977 Kuala Lumpur	Women's singles

Maria Socorro "Marissa" Dizon Sanchez (June 25, 1956 – January 4, 2026) was a Filipino tennis player.

== Early life ==
Maria Socorro Dizon Sanchez, was born on June 25, 1956. Commonly known as Marissa Sanchez, she is part of the Sanchez–Ayuyao clan of Angeles City and Magalang in Pampanga. She took up tennis at age 12 in Angeles City.

== Career ==
Sanchez became the top player in the Philippines for the first time in 1975, when she won both the National Tennis Open and Philta Open.

She was part of the first Philippines squad to compete at the 1977 SEA Games and was runner-up to Indonesia's Yolanda Sumarno in singles, with her silver medal the first of any color attained by a Filipino tennis player at the event.

Sanchez competed at the main draw of the Federation Cup (now the Billie Jean King Cup), representing the Philippines in the 1978 edition.

She made another Federation Cup appearance in 1981, before retiring in her early 30s.

== Later life and death ==
After retiring, Sanchez went on to become a coach in her home province of Pampanga where she held training camps and mentored the youth. Sanchez died from heart failure on January 4, 2026, at the age of 69 in Angeles City.
