= Andres Battad =

Filipino tennis coach

- Country (sports): Philippines
- Born: 5 June 1964 (age 61)

Singles
- Highest ranking: No. 773 (14 Jul 1986)

Doubles
- Highest ranking: No. 792 (7 Jul 1986)
Medal record
Southeast Asian Games
Silver medal – second place	1987 Jakarta	Men's singles
Silver medal – second place	1987 Jakarta	Men's team
Silver medal – second place	1989 Kuala Lumpur	Men's team

Andres Battad (born 5 June 1964) is a Filipino tennis coach and former professional player.

Battad, a resident of Hong Kong since 1991, was a national tennis player for the Philippines in the 1980s and is originally from Cotabato on the island of Mindanao. He was runner-up to Tintus Arianto Wibowo at the 1987 Southeast Asian Games and a playing member of the Philippines Davis Cup team in both 1987 and 1988.

Now working as a tennis coach, Battad trained British player Tara Moore while she lived in Hong Kong and has also worked with Hong Kong number one Venise Chan.
