= Srichaphan =

Srichaphan is a Thai surname. Notable people with the surname include:

- Narathorn Srichaphan (born 1972), Thai tennis player
- Paradorn Srichaphan (born 1979), Thai tennis player
- Thanakorn Srichaphan (born 1968), Thai tennis player and coach
