= Waya Walalangi =

Indonesian tennis player

- Country (sports): Indonesia
- Born: 5 February 1971 (age 54)
- Prize money: $9,067

Singles
- Career record: 15–36
- Highest ranking: No. 419 (11 May 1992)

Doubles
- Career record: 17–29
- Career titles: 1 ITF
- Highest ranking: No. 383 (13 Mar 1989)
Medal record
Southeast Asian Games
Gold medal – first place	1989 Kuala Lumpur	Women's doubles
Gold medal – first place	1989 Kuala Lumpur	Women's team

Waya Walalangi (born 5 February 1971) is an Indonesian former professional tennis player.

Walalangi, younger sister of Davis Cup player Donald, competed in the Federation Cup from 1987 to 1989. She featured in five ties and lost both of her singles rubbers but was unbeaten in three doubles rubbers.

A two-time Southeast Asian Games gold medalist, Walalangi had a best singles world ranking of 419 and was ranked as high as 383 in doubles. She won one doubles title while competing on the ITF Women's Circuit.

== ITF finals ==
=== Doubles: 1 (1–0) ===
Result	Date	Tournament	Surface	Partner	Opponents	Score
Win	Mar 1989	Jakarta, Indonesia	Hard	(Indonesia) Suzanna Wibowo	(Indonesia) Lukky Tedjamukti (Indonesia) Agustina Wibisono	6–2, 2–6, 6–1
