= Tennis at the 1986 Asian Games =

- Venue: Olympic Park Tennis Center
- Dates: 22 September – 3 October 1986

Tennis competitions at the 1986 Asian Games at the Seoul Olympic Park Tennis Center in Seoul were held from 22 September to 3 October 1986.

South Korea dominated the competition winning four gold medals.

== Medalists ==
Event	Gold	Silver	Bronze
Men's singles	Yoo Jin-sun; South Korea	Kim Bong-soo; South Korea	Liu Shuhua; China
Men's doubles	South Korea; Yoo Jin-sun; Kim Bong-soo	China; Ma Keqin; Liu Shuhua	Indonesia; Donald Wailan-Walalangi; Sulistyono
Men's team	South Korea; Kim Bong-soo; Roh Gap-taik; Song Dong-wook; Yoo Jin-sun	China; Liu Shuhua; Ma Keqin; Xie Zhao; You Wei	Thailand; Vittaya Samrej; Thanakorn Srichaphan; Woraphol Thongkhamchu; Sombat Uamongkol
Women's singles	Li Xinyi; China	Lee Jeong-soon; South Korea	Kim Soo-ok; South Korea
Women's doubles	Indonesia; Suzanna Anggarkusuma; Yayuk Basuki	South Korea; Lee Jeong-soon; Kim Il-soon	South Korea; Shin Soon-ho; Park Yang-ja
Women's team	China; Duan Lilan; Li Xinyi; Pu Xiufen; Zhong Ni	South Korea; Kim Il-soon; Kim Soo-ok; Lee Jeong-soon; Park Yang-ja	Indonesia; Suzanna Anggarkusuma; Yayuk Basuki; Sri Utaminingsih
Mixed doubles	South Korea; Yoo Jin-sun; Lee Jeong-soon	China; You Wei; Zhong Ni	Indonesia; Tintus Arianto Wibowo; Suzanna Anggarkusuma

== Medal table ==
Rank	Nation	Gold	Silver	Bronze	Total
1	South Korea (KOR)	4	4	2	10
2	China (CHN)	2	3	1	6
3	Indonesia (INA)	1	0	3	4
4	Thailand (THA)	0	0	1	1
Totals (4 entries)		7	7	7	21
