= List of Indonesia Davis Cup team representatives =

This is a list of tennis players who have represented the Indonesia Davis Cup team in an official Davis Cup match. Indonesia have taken part in the competition since 1961.

== Players ==
Player	W-L (Total)	W-L (Singles)	W-L (Doubles)	Ties	Debut
Faisal Aidil	2–0	1–0	1–0	1	2006
Muhammad Althaf Dhaifullah	0–1	0–1	0–0	1	2018
Tintus Arianto-Wibowo	15–20	14–16	1–4	17	1981
Nesa Arta	3–2	0–0	3–2	5	2008
Budiman Aznar	0–1	0–0	0–1	1	1971
Justin Barki	2–3	1–1	1–2	3	2018
Sebastian Da Costa	0–1	0–0	0–1	1	1996
Dede Suhendar Dinata	0–4	0–4	0–0	3	1992
Ari Fahresi	1–0	1–0	0–0	1	2019
Hadiman	3–4	1–3	2–1	7	1974
Peter Handoyo	6–3	4–3	2–0	4	2001
Daniel Heryanto	2–4	1–3	1–1	2	1990
Edi Kusdaryanto	4–0	0–0	4–0	4	1996
Benny Wijaya	6–10	6–9	0–1	8	1991
Abdul Kahar Mim	0–2	0–2	0–0	1	1989
Diko Murdono	0–2	0–2	0–0	1	1968
Wisnu Adi Nugroho	1–5	1–5	0–0	4	2012
Hendri Susilo Pramono	5–3	1–1	4–2	7	1999
Andrian Raturandang	2–18	2–17	0–1	10	1996
Muhammad Rifqi Fitriadi	0–1	0–1	0–0	1	2019
Christopher Rungkat	39–17	24–12	15–5	23	2007
Samudra Sangitan	2–1	2–1	0–0	3	1973
Aditya Hari Sasongko	4–8	4–7	0–1	11	2008
Kong-Loen Sie	0–1	0–0	0–1	1	1961
Elbert Sie	7–11	4–8	3–3	12	2006
Prima Simpatiaji	9–11	9–11	0–0	12	2003
Andery Styawanto	1–0	0–0	1–0	1	2008
Sutarjo Sugiarto	1–7	0–4	1–3	4	1961
Hary Suharyadi	11–16	6–12	5–4	13	1984
Sulistyono	2–2	1–1	1–1	2	1986
Itjas Sumarno	0–2	0–2	0–0	1	1961
Anthony Susanto	1–4	1–3	0–1	4	2017
David Agung Susanto	11–20	7–13	4–7	17	2010
Donny Susetyo	1–3	0–0	1–3	4	1994
Suwandi Suwandi	34–29	23–26	11–3	33	1993
Liep-Tjiauw Tan	1–0	1–0	0–0	1	1961
Teddy Tandjung	1–1	0–0	1–1	2	1995
Yustedjo Tarik	17–19	13–15	4–4	18	1973
Sunu Wahyu Trijati	7–10	3–8	4–2	13	2005
Gunawan Trismuwantara	1–2	1–1	0–1	2	2021
Donald Wailan-Walalangi	5–4	0–0	5–4	9	1984
Sulistyo Wibowo	6–5	0–0	6–5	11	1996
Ayrton Wibowo	0–3	0–3	0–0	3	2008
Febi Widhiyanto	15–9	15–8	0–1	13	1998
Gondo Widjojo	12–25	5–14	7–11	20	1967
Atet Wijono	13–25	8–15	5–10	19	1969
Ludi Wijono	2–2	1–1	1–1	3	1977
Bonit Wiryawan	19–16	3–5	16–11	29	1990
Jacky Wulur	0–1	0–0	0–1	1	1971
