= Andrian Raturandang =

Indonesian tennis player

- Country (sports): Indonesia
- Born: 29 July 1976 (age 49)
- Plays: Right-handed
- Prize money: $16,787

Singles
- Career record: 0–1 (ATP Tour)
- Highest ranking: No. 484 (20 Oct 1997)

Doubles
- Career record: 0–2 (ATP Tour)
- Highest ranking: No. 391 (25 Oct 1999)
Medal record
Southeast Asian Games
Gold medal – first place	1997 Jakarta	Men's team
Bronze medal – third place	1993 Singapore	Men's doubles
Bronze medal – third place	1993 Singapore	Men's team
Bronze medal – third place	1997 Jakarta	Men's singles
Bronze medal – third place	1997 Jakarta	Men's doubles

Andrian Raturandang (born 29 July 1976) is an Indonesian former professional tennis player. He was a gold medalist for Indonesia at the 1997 Southeast Asian Games.

Raturandang reached a career high singles ranking of 484 while competing on the professional tour, mostly in satellite and Futures events. He made one ATP Tour singles main draw, as a wildcard at the 1996 Indonesia Open, where he was beaten in the first round by Chris Wilkinson. He also featured twice in the doubles main draw of the Indonesia Open.

A five-time Southeast Asian Games medalist, Raturandang represented Indonesia in 10 Davis Cup ties, between 1996 and 1998 and then in 2001. From his 19 singles rubbers he won only two of them, against Tsai Chia-yen of Chinese Taipei and Sean Karam of Lebanon.

== See also ==
- List of Indonesia Davis Cup team representatives
