= Sofronio Palahang =

Filipino tennis player (born 1967)

- Country (sports): Philippines
- Born: 22 September 1967 (age 58)

Singles
- Career record: 1–5 (Davis Cup)
- Highest ranking: No. 694 (30 Nov 1992)

Doubles
- Career record: 1–6 (Davis Cup)
- Highest ranking: No. 558 (23 Aug 1993)
Medal record
Southeast Asian Games
Gold medal – first place	1993 Singapore	Men's team
Silver medal – second place	1991 Manila	Men's team
Silver medal – second place	1993 Singapore	Mixed doubles
Silver medal – second place	1995 Chiang Mai	Men's team
Bronze medal – third place	1993 Singapore	Men's doubles
Bronze medal – third place	1995 Chiang Mai	Men's doubles

Sofronio Palahang (born 22 September 1967), also known as Camoy Palahang, is a Filipino former professional tennis player. He featured on the professional tennis tour in the 1990s.

Palahang appeared in eight Davis Cup ties for the Philippines, which included a 1991 World Group qualifier against Sweden. In his final Davis Cup appearance in 1996 he achieved the only singles win of his career, over Taiwanese player Chen Chih-jung in five sets. He won six Southeast Asian Games medals representing the Philippines and also competed at the Asian Games.
