= Jennifer Saberon =

Filipino tennis player (born 1969)

- Country (sports): Philippines
- Born: 20 January 1969 (age 57)

Singles
- Career record: 1–6 (Federation Cup)

Doubles
- Career record: 2–7 (Federation Cup)
Medal record
Southeast Asian Games
Gold medal – first place	1991 Manila	Mixed doubles
Silver medal – second place	1985 Bangkok	Mixed doubles
Silver medal – second place	1987 Jakarta	Mixed doubles
Silver medal – second place	1991 Manila	Women's team
Bronze medal – third place	1985 Bangkok	Women's doubles
Bronze medal – third place	1985 Bangkok	Women's team
Bronze medal – third place	1987 Jakarta	Women's team
Bronze medal – third place	1991 Manila	Women's doubles

Jennifer Saberon (born 20 January 1969) is a Filipino former professional tennis player.

A serve-and-volleyer, Saberon started playing tennis at the age of 12 and was ranked amongst the world's top 20 in junior tennis. She made a Wimbledon semi-final in girls' doubles in 1986.

Saberon competed for the Philippines Federation Cup team in the late 1980s, appearing in nine ties.

As a national representative she also featured in multiple editions of the Southeast Asian Games and won eight medals, including a mixed doubles gold at her home games in Manila in 1991.

Saberon left the tour in the 1990s to study in the United States and play collegiate tennis, first at St. Ambrose University in Iowa and then Loyola Marymount University.
