= Abdul Kahar Mim =

Indonesian tennis player

- Country (sports): Indonesia
- Born: 6 November 1968 (age 57) Samarinda, Indonesia

Singles
- Career record: 0–2 (Davis Cup)
- Highest ranking: No. 446 (31 Aug 1987)

Doubles
- Highest ranking: No. 475 (9 Nov 1987)
Medal record
Southeast Asian Games
Gold medal – first place	1987 Jakarta	Men's team
Bronze medal – third place	1987 Jakarta	Men's doubles

Abdul Kahar Mim (born 6 November 1968) is an Indonesian former professional tennis player.

Kahar Mim, born and raised in Samarinda on the island of Borneo, was a Southeast Asian Games gold medalist for Indonesia in 1987. His only Davis Cup appearance was in a 1989 World Group tie against reigning champions West Germany in Karlsruhe, where he lost singles rubbers to Boris Becker and Carl-Uwe Steeb.

== See also ==
- List of Indonesia Davis Cup team representatives
