= List of Japan Fed Cup team representatives =

This is a list of tennis players who have represented the Japan Fed Cup team in an official Fed Cup match. Japan have taken part in the competition since 1964.

== Players ==
Player	W-L (Total)	W-L (Singles)	W-L (Doubles)	Ties	Debut
Shuko Aoyama	11 – 4	-	11 – 4	16	2013
Shinobu Asagoe	17 – 10	12 – 8	5 – 2	21	1999
Kimiko Date	21 – 11	16 – 8	5 – 3	23	2010
Misaki Doi	9 – 9	8 – 7	1 – 2	16	2011
Mana Endo	4 – 5	3 – 3	1 – 2	7	1992
Rika Fujiwara	23 – 5	5 – 3	18 – 2	29	2001
Kayoko Fukuoka	12 – 4	-	12 – 4	16	1973
Fumiko Furuhashi	1 – 5	0 – 2	1 – 3	5	1979
Hideko Goto	6 – 5	6 – 5	-	11	1973
Kimiyo Hatanaka	23 – 10	11 – 8	12 – 2	20	1970
Nao Hibino	4 – 4	4 – 4	-	8	2016
Rika Hiraki	3 – 2	-	3 – 2	5	1993
Eri Hozumi	12 – 3	3 – 1	9 – 2	12	2015
Etsuko Inoue	13 – 17	5 – 10	8 – 7	20	1982
Miyu Kato	6 – 0	1 – 0	5 – 0	5	2018
Maya Kidowaki	3 – 3	-	3 – 3	6	1990
Akiko Kijimuta	3 – 10	3 – 7	0 – 3	11	1984
Naoko Kijimuta	0 – 3	-	0 – 3	3	1997
Kazuko Kuromatsu	0 – 3	0 – 2	0 – 1	2	1964
Mihoka Matshushima	0 – 1	-	0 – 1	1	1976
Nana Miyagi	10 – 6	2 – 1	8 – 5	17	1989
Reiko Miyagi	0 – 2	0 – 1	0 – 1	1	1964
Akiko Morigami	18 – 5	12 – 4	6 – 1	15	2002
Ayumi Morita	23 – 14	17 – 9	6 – 5	20	2007
Kyōko Nagatsuka	2 – 4	0 – 2	2 – 2	5	1995
Kiyomi Nakagawa	2 – 3	1 – 2	1 – 1	3	1976
Aiko Nakamura	6 – 4	5 – 4	1 – 0	7	2005
Junri Namigata	5 – 0	3 – 0	2 – 0	3	2011
Kurumi Nara	11 – 7	10 – 7	1 – 0	14	2011
Makoto Ninomiya	5 – 0	-	5 – 0	5	2018
Kiyoko Nomura	7 – 7	4 – 4	3 – 3	9	1978
Saori Obata	12 – 5	6 – 3	6 – 2	16	1999
Yohko Obata	0 – 3	0 – 1	0 – 2	2	1964
Emiko Okagawa	4 – 1	1 – 1	3 – 0	4	1983
Kumiko Okamoto	1 – 3	1 – 1	0 – 2	4	1982
Naomi Osaka	5 – 1	5 – 1	-	5	2017
Risa Ozaki	2 – 0	-	2 – 0	2	2014
Toshiko Sade	2 – 4	2 – 4	-	6	1975
Miho Saeki	3 – 3	3 – 3	-	4	1998
Michiko Saji	0 – 1	-	0 – 1	1	1976
Naoko Sato	10 – 12	6 – 8	4 – 4	14	1976
Junko Sawamatsu	1 – 2	-	1 – 2	3	1970
Kazuko Sawamatsu	44 – 10	25 – 5	19 – 5	30	1970
Naoko Sawamatsu	8 – 12	8 – 12	-	15	1988
Yurika Sema	3 – 1	-	3 – 1	4	2010
Ai Sugiyama	25 – 22	13 – 17	12 – 5	26	1995
Erika Takao	1 – 1	1 – 1	-	1	2007
Masako Yanagi	15 – 13	4 – 6	11 – 7	18	1981
Sonoe Yonezawa	1 – 1	1 – 1	-	2	1979
Yuka Yoshida	9 – 6	3 – 5	6 – 1	14	1998
