= Robert Angelo =

Filipino tennis player (born 1970)

- Country (sports): Philippines
- Born: 31 July 1970 (age 55)

Singles
- Career record: 2–7 (Davis Cup)
- Highest ranking: No. 765 (1 May 1995)

Doubles
- Career record: 0–8 (Davis Cup)
- Highest ranking: No. 566 (15 May 1995)
Medal record
Southeast Asian Games
Gold medal – first place	1993 Singapore	Men's team
Silver medal – second place	1995 Chiang Mai	Men's team
Bronze medal – third place	1993 Singapore	Men's doubles
Bronze medal – third place	1995 Chiang Mai	Men's doubles
Bronze medal – third place	1997 Jakarta	Men's team

Robert "Bobie" Angelo (born 31 July 1970) is a Filipino former professional tennis player.

Angelo was a member of the Philippines Davis Cup team during the 1990s, appearing in a total of 10 ties. Between 1993 and 1998 he played in nine singles and eight doubles rubbers for the Philippines. He won two of his singles rubbers, against Japan's Ryuso Tsujino in 1995 and Suwandi of Indonesia in 1997.

A five-time Southeast Asian Games medalist, Angelo's tally includes a gold medal in the team event at Singapore in 1993. He also represented the Philippines in the Asian Games.

Angelo later became a coach at the Philippine Tennis Academy.
