= Kiyoko Nomura =

Japanese tennis player (1954–2016)

- Country (sports): Japan
- Born: 17 November 1954
- Died: 17 February 2016 (aged 61)

Singles

Grand Slam singles results
- Australian Open: 2R (1975)
- French Open: Q2 (1980)

Doubles

Grand Slam doubles results
- Australian Open: 1R (1974, 1975)
Medal record
Asian Games
Gold medal – first place	1978 Bangkok	Women's team
Silver medal – second place	1978 Bangkok	Women's doubles
Bronze medal – third place	1978 Bangkok	Women's singles

Kiyoko Nomura (17 November 1954 – 17 February 2016) was a Japanese former professional tennis player.

Nomura, a multiple medalist at the 1978 Asian Games, represented the Japan Federation Cup team from 1978 to 1981. She was the singles winner at the All Japan Championships in 1979 and 1981, as well as a five-time national champion in doubles. While competing on the international tour she featured in the main draw of the Australian Open.

== See also ==
- List of Japan Fed Cup team representatives
