= Aga Soemarno =

- Country (sports): Indonesia
- Born: 21 June 1966 (age 59) Bandung, Indonesia

Singles
- Highest ranking: No. 594 (14 Jul 1986)

Doubles
- Career record: 0–1
- Highest ranking: No. 467 (7 Mar 1988)
Medal record
Southeast Asian Games
Bronze medal – third place	1991 Manila	Men's doubles
Bronze medal – third place	1991 Manila	Men's team

Aga Gemutra Damarga Soemarno (born 21 June 1966) is an Indonesian former professional tennis player.

Soemarno, born in Bandung, is the only son of Indonesian national tennis player Yolanda Soemarno. One of his two sisters, Tanya, was also a tennis player and reached a world ranking of 281.

A collegiate tennis player for Ferris State University, Soemarno won the 1989 NCAA Division II doubles championships partnering Kurt Hammerschmidt.

Soemarno won two bronze medals for Indonesia at the 1991 Southeast Asian Games.

In 1994 he made the only ATP Tour main draw appearances of his career, in the Jakarta Open doubles event.

His sons, Armando, Fabian and Giorgio, have all played professional tennis.
