= Philippine Tennis Academy =

Tennis academy in Muntinlupa, Philippines

- Formation: 2011; 15 years ago
- Purpose: Sports academy
- Headquarters: Alabang, Muntinlupa, Metro Manila, Philippines
- Location: 3 satellite camps
- Chairman: Oscar Hilado
- President: Rommie Chan

The Philippine Tennis Academy (PTA) is a tennis academy in Alabang, Muntinlupa, Metro Manila, Philippines.

== History ==
The Philippine Tennis Academy (PTA) was established in 2011 as a non-stock, non-profit organization to recruit tennis prospects from across the country. Its foundation was led by Jean Henri Lhuillier and Rommie Chan, with other benefactors including Felix Barrientos, Tonico Climent, Oscar Hilado, Hanky Lee, Fernando Suarez, Raymond Suarez, and Joey Torres.

However Lhuillier and Chan began developing tennis players as early as 2008 with Francis Alcantara.

== Locations ==
The main location of the PTA is at the Ayala Alabang Village in Alabang, Muntinlupa, Metro Manila where it houses and trains members of its elite program. As of 2024, it has satellite camps; in Davao, Cagayan de Oro and La Carlota.

== Services ==
The PTA develops Filipino tennis players from a young age. Aside from tennis training, the PTA aids players' college studies including funding and tutoring. Some players also secure college scholarships to study in the United States.

Their program exist in parallel with the Philippine Tennis Association (Philta), helping the federation develop players who could suit up for the Philippine national teams.

== Notable people ==
Players

- Francis Alcantara
- Tennielle Madis

Coaches

- Robert Angelo
