= Teddy Tandjung =

Indonesian tennis player

- Country (sports): Indonesia
- Born: 20 February 1973 (age 53)

Singles
- Highest ranking: No. 963 (10 September 1990)

Doubles
- Career record: 0–1 (ATP Tour)
- Highest ranking: No. 531 (14 August 1995)

Teddy Tandjung (born 20 February 1973) is an Indonesian former professional tennis player.

Tandjung, a native of Palembang, played college tennis for the University of Central Florida and featured on the professional tour during the 1990s.

Competing in multi-sport events, Tandjung won three bronze medals for Indonesia at the 1993 Southeast Asian Games in Singapore and a further bronze medal at the 1994 Asian Games in Hiroshima.

In 1995 he appeared in two Davis Cup ties for his country, partnering Donny Susetyo in doubles rubbers against South Korea and Chinese Taipei, for a loss and a win respectively.

== See also ==
- List of Indonesia Davis Cup team representatives
