= Joice Sutedja =

Indonesian tennis player

- Full name: Joice Riana Sutedja
- Country (sports): Indonesia
- Born: 5 June 1974 (age 51)
- Prize money: $22,920

Singles
- Career record: 52–52
- Career titles: 1 ITF
- Highest ranking: No. 220 (13 Sep 1993)

Doubles
- Career record: 16–41
- Highest ranking: No. 343 (15 Feb 1993)
Medal record
Southeast Asian Games
Gold medal – first place	1991 Manila	Women's team
Silver medal – second place	1991 Manila	Women's singles
Silver medal – second place	1991 Manila	Women's doubles

Joice Riana Sutedja (born 5 June 1974) is an Indonesian former professional tennis player.

== Tennis career ==
Sutedja, a native of Cirebon, won three medals for Indonesia at the 1991 Southeast Asian Games. She reached a career high singles ranking of 220 while competing on the professional tour and won one ITF title. Her best WTA Tour performance was a second round appearance at the 1993 Asian Open in Osaka. She represented her country in two Federation Cup rubbers in 1993 and won both, the first in doubles against the Philippines and the other in the opening singles rubbers of a playoff tie against Singapore, which helped Indonesia earn promotion to the World Group.

== Personal life ==
Sutedja has two daughters from her marriage to Ali Santoso.

== ITF finals ==
=== Singles: 1 (1–0) ===
Outcome	No.	Date	Tournament	Surface	Opponent	Score
Winner	1.	Aug 1990	Semarang, Indonesia	Clay	(Indonesia) Irawati Moerid	4–6, 6–4, 6–1
