= Dede Suhendar Dinata =

Indonesian tennis player

- Country (sports): Indonesia
- Born: 14 December 1969 (age 56)
- Prize money: $9,269

Singles
- Career record: 0–4 (Davis Cup)
- Highest ranking: No. 603 (13 Mar 2000)
Medal record
Southeast Asian Games
Bronze medal – third place	1991 Manila	Men's doubles
Bronze medal – third place	1991 Manila	Men's team
Summer Universiade
Bronze medal – third place	1991 Sheffield	Men's doubles

Dede Suhendar Dinata (born 14 December 1969) is an Indonesian former professional tennis player.

A native of Bogor, Suhendar Dinata had a best singles ranking on the professional tour of 603 in the world, featuring mostly at satellite and Futures level. He was a quarter-finalist at the 1991 Jakarta Challenger.

Suhendar Dinata, who won two bronze medals at the 1991 Southeast Asian Games, was an occasional member of the Indonesia Davis Cup team. He played in a total of four singles rubbers, two in 1992 and two more in 1998.

== See also ==
- List of Indonesia Davis Cup team representatives
