= Tintus Arianto Wibowo =

Indonesian tennis player

- Country (sports): Indonesia
- Born: 19 August 1960 (age 65) Surabaya, Indonesia

Singles
- Career record: 14–16 (Davis Cup)
- Highest ranking: No. 308 (7 August 1989)

Doubles
- Career record: 1–4 (Davis Cup)
- Highest ranking: No. 405 (23 November 1987)
Medal record
Asian Games
Gold medal – first place	1982 New Delhi	Men's team
Bronze medal – third place	1986 Seoul	Mixed doubles
Bronze medal – third place	2002 Busan	Men's team
Southeast Asian Games
Gold medal – first place	1981 Manila	Men's team
Gold medal – first place	1983 Singapore	Men's team
Gold medal – first place	1985 Bangkok	Men's singles
Gold medal – first place	1985 Bangkok	Mixed doubles
Gold medal – first place	1985 Bangkok	Men's team
Gold medal – first place	1987 Jakarta	Men's singles
Gold medal – first place	1987 Jakarta	Men's team
Gold medal – first place	1989 Kuala Lumpur	Men's doubles
Silver medal – second place	1981 Manila	Men's doubles
Silver medal – second place	1983 Singapore	Men's singles
Silver medal – second place	1983 Singapore	Men's doubles
Silver medal – second place	1983 Singapore	Mixed doubles
Silver medal – second place	1989 Kuala Lumpur	Men's singles
Bronze medal – third place	1985 Bangkok	Men's doubles
Bronze medal – third place	1987 Jakarta	Men's doubles
Bronze medal – third place	1989 Kuala Lumpur	Mixed doubles
Bronze medal – third place	1989 Kuala Lumpur	Men's team

Tintus Arianto Wibowo (born 19 August 1960) is an Indonesian former professional tennis player.

== Biography ==
Born in Surabaya, Wibowo was a regular fixture in the Indonesia Davis Cup team during the 1980s, featuring in a total of 17 ties. This includes World Group appearances in 1983 and 1989, where he played singles rubbers against Mats Wilander in the former and Boris Becker in the latter.

Wibowo was a two-time Southeast Asian Games singles champion and also represented Indonesia at the Asian Games. He won an Asian Games gold medal in the team event at New Delhi in 1982 and a mixed doubles bronze medal in Seoul in 1986.

Together with his wife, Federation Cup player Suzanna Anggarkusuma, Wibowo runs the Lucky Tennis School in Jakarta. Their son, Ayrton Wibowo, also coaches at the school and is a former Davis Cup player.

== See also ==
- List of Indonesia Davis Cup team representatives
