= Kimiyo Hatanaka =

Japanese tennis player (born 1944)

- Full name: Kimiyo Hatanaka (nee Yagahara)
- Country (sports): Japan
- Born: 16 April 1944 (age 81); Suginami-ku, Tokyo, Japan
- Height: 172 cm (5 ft 8 in)

Singles

Grand Slam singles results
- French Open: 1R (1970, 1977)
- Wimbledon: 1R (1970)
- US Open: 1R (1969)

Doubles

Grand Slam doubles results
- Australian Open: 1R (1969)
- French Open: 2R (1969, 1970)
- Wimbledon: 2R (1969)

Kimiyo Hatanaka (born 16 April 1944), previously Kimiyo Yagahara, is a Japanese former professional tennis player.

A native of Tokyo, Hatanaka was the singles winner at the 1971 All Japan Tennis Championships and won a further six national titles during her career in women's doubles.

Hatanaka was a member of the Japan Federation Cup team during the 1970s, amassing wins in 11 singles and 12 doubles rubbers. She also represented Japan at the Asian Games and won six medals.

On the professional tour, Hatanaka competed in the main draw of all four grand slam tournaments.

Hatanaka runs the Big K tennis in Tokyo and has coached many Japanese professional players.

== See also ==
- List of Japan Fed Cup team representatives
