= Tennis at the 1973 SEAP Games =

The Tennis at the 1973 SEAP Games was held between 3 September to 8 September at National Stadium, Singapore.

== Medal summary ==
Event	Gold	Silver	Bronze
Men Singles	(Thailand) Somparan Champisri	(South Vietnam) Vo Van Thanh	(Thailand) P. Boratissa (South Vietnam) Võ Văn Bảy
Women Singles	(Thailand) Suthasinee Sirikaya	(South Vietnam) Nguyen Thi Thinh	(Malaysia) Radhika Menoon (Malaysia) Lim Kheow Suan
Men's Doubles	(South Vietnam) Võ Văn Bảy (South Vietnam) Lý Alline An	(Thailand) Somparan Champisri (Thailand) Pichit Boratisa	(Malaysia) Zainuddin Meah (Malaysia) Mohd. Akbar Baba
Women's Doubles	(Malaysia) Radhika Menoon (Malaysia) Lim Kheow Suan	(Thailand) Sida Schmidt (Thailand) Chalatip Phintanon	(Thailand) Suthasinee Sirikaya; Rachaniwan Homsukon (Malaysia) Anna Tie; Zaiton Sulaiman
Mix Doubles	(Thailand) P. Boritasa (Thailand) Sida Schmidt	(Thailand) N. Kanokmaniawan (Thailand) Suthasinee Srikaya	(South Vietnam) Tay Dun Ban; Nguyen Thi Thinh (Malaysia) Zainudin Meah; Lim Kheow Suan
Men's team	(Thailand); Somparn Champsiri; Netr Kanokmaniawan; Pichit Boratisa; T. Sunandecha	(Kingdom of Laos); Sovkanh Syvoravong; Van Chanthara; P. Souvtthaniasay; B. Philavong	(Singapore); Shahrin Osman; Daniel Lim; Amir Leow; Albert Tan (Khmer Republic) KHMER REPUBLIC
Women's team	(Thailand); Suthasinee Sirikaya; Rachaniwan Homsukon; Sida Shmidht; Chalatip Phintanon	(Malaysia); Radhika Menoon; Lim Kheow Suan; Anna Tie; Zaiton Wan Sulaiman	(Singapore); Lim Philan; Vivian Gwee; Margaret Loh; Ong Siong Ngoo

== Medal table ==
Rank	Nation	Gold	Silver	Bronze	Total
1	Thailand (THA)	5	3	2	10
2	South Vietnam (VNM)	1	2	2	5
3	Malaysia (MAS)	1	1	6	8
4	Laos (LAO)	0	1	0	1
5	Singapore (SIN)	0	0	2	2
6	Cambodia (KHM)	0	0	1	1
Totals (6 entries)		7	7	13	27
