= Sri Utaminingsih =

Indonesian tennis player

- Country (sports): Indonesia
- Born: 19 October 1961 (age 64)
- Plays: Right-handed
Medal record
Tennis
Asian Games
Bronze medal – third place	1986 Seoul	Women's team
Southeast Asian Games
Gold medal – first place	1983 Singapore	Mixed doubles
Gold medal – first place	1981 Manila	Women's team
Gold medal – first place	1983 Singapore	Women's team
Gold medal – first place	1985 Bangkok	Women's team
Silver medal – second place	1981 Manila	Women's doubles
Bronze medal – third place	1985 Bangkok	Mixed doubles
Bronze medal – third place	1985 Bangkok	Women's doubles
Squash
Southeast Asian Games
Bronze medal – third place	2001 Kuala Lumpur	Women's team

Sri Utaminingsih (born 19 October 1961) is an Indonesian former professional tennis player.

Utaminingsih played Federation Cup tennis for Indonesia in the 1980s, featuring in 11 ties. Her appearances include a tie against the United States in California, where she lost in the singles to Chris Evert. She won one singles and four doubles rubbers in her Federation Cup career.

A regular participant at the Southeast Asian Games, Utaminingsih won tennis gold medals in mixed doubles and team events. She was an Indonesian representative at the 1986 Asian Games in Seoul and won a bronze medal in the team competition, playing with Suzanna Anggarkusuma and Yayuk Basuki.

Utaminingsih was also a Southeast Asian Games medalist in the sport of squash.

From 2014 to 2017, Utaminingsih served as team captain of the Indonesia Fed Cup team.
