= Yustedjo Tarik =

Indonesian tennis player

- Full name: Mohammad Yustedjo Tarik
- Country (sports): Indonesia
- Born: 30 August 1953 (age 73) Jakarta, Indonesia

Singles
- Career record: 13–17 (ATP Tour & Davis Cup)
- Highest ranking: No. 355 (5 Mar 1975)

Doubles
- Career record: 4–6 (ATP Tour & Davis Cup)
- Highest ranking: No. 360 (9 Nov 1987)
Medal record
Men's tennis
Representing Indonesia
Asian Games
Gold medal – first place	1978 Bangkok	Doubles
Gold medal – first place	1978 Bangkok	Team
Gold medal – first place	1982 New Delhi	Singles
Gold medal – first place	1982 New Delhi	Team
SEA Games
Gold medal – first place	1977 Kuala Lumpur	Team
Gold medal – first place	1979 Jakarta	Singles
Gold medal – first place	1979 Jakarta	Team
Gold medal – first place	1981 Manila	Team
Gold medal – first place	1983 Singapore	Team
Silver medal – second place	1977 Kuala Lumpur	Singles
Silver medal – second place	1977 Kuala Lumpur	Doubles
Silver medal – second place	1979 Jakarta	Doubles
Silver medal – second place	1981 Manila	Doubles

Mohammad Yustedjo Tarik (born 30 August 1953), known as Yustedjo Tarik or Tedjo, is an Indonesian former professional tennis player. He was the SEA Games and Asian Games champion.

== Early life and career ==
Tedjo grew up in an environment steeped in sports. His father, Muhammad Yusuf Tarik, was a former national athlete in the 1930s, and it was through him that Tedjo was first introduced to tennis. Although as a child Tedjo preferred flying kites and cockfighting, slowly but surely, his love for tennis grew deeper.

Tedjo began his tennis career in earnest after winning a junior tennis championship in Malang in 1971. This achievement earned him a spot on the national team under the guidance of Sugiarto, a renowned tennis coach in Indonesia. For five years, Tedjo underwent intensive training that shaped him into one of the best tennis players in Asia.

Tedjo won two gold medals at the 1978 Asian Games in Bangkok and two more at the 1982 Asian Games in New Delhi. He was also a member of the Indonesian tennis team that reached the round of 16 in the 1982 Davis Cup.

Tedjo made his debut for the Indonesia Davis Cup team in 1973. During his Davis Cup career, which spanned 14-years, he had wins in 13 singles rubbers, one of which was over India's Anand Amritraj in 1981. Tedjo was a member of the Indonesia team that won the Eastern Zone in 1982 and the following year made appearances in the World Group, including against a Sweden side featuring Mats Wilander.

After retiring from professional tennis, Tedjo has remained active in the tennis. He has won several veterans’ tournaments.

== ITF Masters Tour ==
=== Singles: 11 (6 titles, 5 runner-ups) ===
Legend Category World Championships Category MT1000 Category MT700 (1–3) Category MT400 (1–1) Category MT200 (0–1) Category MT100 (4–0)	Finals by surface Hard (2–1) Clay (3–2) Grass (0–1) Carpet (1–1)

Result	W–L	Date	Tournament	Tier	Age	Surface	Opponent	Score	Ref
Win	1–0	Oct 2010	ITF Seniors Circuit Beijing, China	G5/MT100	55+	Hard	(Indonesia) Didiek Edhie	4–6, 4–2 ret.	
Win	2–0	Oct 2017	Indonesia International Seniors Championships	G5/MT100	60+	Hard	(Indonesia) Didiek Edhie	1–0 ret.	
Win	3–0	Jun 2018	Esslingen Seniors Open, Germany	G5/MT100	65+	Clay	(Germany) Peter Kleinschmidt	6–0, 6–0	
Win	4–0	Jun 2018	Hanover Seniors Open, Germany	G5/MT100	65+	Clay	(Germany) Anton Klima	6–1, 6–1	
Loss	4–1	Nov 2018	Victorian Seniors Grasscourt Championships, Australia	G2/MT700	65+	Grass	(Australia) Wayne Cowley	4–6, 4–6	
Loss	4–2	Apr 2019	International Tennis Point Open, Turkey	G4/MT200	65+	Clay	(Indonesia) Hadiman	4–6, 6–7^{(3)}	
Win	5–2	Jun 2019	Intern. Ottersweierer Senioren-Pfingstturnier, Germany	G2/MT700	65+	Clay	(Germany) Rainer Friemel	5–7, 6–3, 6–4	
Loss	5–3	Aug 2019	Indonesia Open	G2/MT700	65+	Hard	(Indonesia) Hadiman	3–6, 2–6	
Loss	5–4	Nov 2019	Victorian Seniors Championships, Australia	G2/MT700	65+	Clay	(Indonesia) Hadiman	1–6, 2–6	
Win	6–4	Mar 2025	MT400 Okinawa, Japan	MT400	70+	Carpet	(Japan) Ryuichi Iwamoto	6–2, 6–1	
Loss	6–5	Jun 2025	MT400 Hakodate, Japan	MT400	70+	Carpet	(Australia) Dennis Maddern	0–6, 2–6	

=== Doubles: 9 (6 titles, 3 runner-ups) ===
Legend Category World Championships Category MT1000 Category MT700 (2–2) Category MT400 (0–1) Category MT200 (2–0) Category MT100 (2–0)	Finals by surface Hard (4–0) Clay (1–2) Grass (0–0) Carpet (1–1)

Result	W–L	Date	Tournament	Tier	Age	Surface	Partner	Opponent	Score	Ref
Win	1–0	Oct 2017	Indonesia International Seniors Championships	G5/MT100	60+	Hard	(Indonesia) Didiek Edhie	(Indonesia) Jacob (Indonesia) Saidi	6–2, 6–0	
Win	2–0	Jun 2018	Hanover Seniors Open, Germany (Note: This tournament uses a round robin system.)	G5/MT100	65+	Hard	(Indonesia) Samuel Lucas Simon	(Germany) Wolfgang Gawlik (Germany) Dieter Sadlowski	6–3, 6–1	
Win	2–0	Jun 2018	Hanover Seniors Open, Germany	G5/MT100	65+	Hard	(Indonesia) Samuel Lucas Simon	(Germany) Wilhelm Holz (Germany) Heiner Schwarting	6-2, 6–0	
Win	3–0	Apr 2019	International Tennis Point Open, Turkey	G4/MT200	65+	Clay	(Indonesia) Samuel Lucas Simon	(Indonesia) Hadiman (Netherlands) Willy Halim	6–2, 6–2	
Loss	3–1	Jun 2019	Intern. Ottersweierer Senioren-Pfingstturnier, Germany	G2/MT700	60+	Clay	(Indonesia) Samuel Lucas Simon	(Germany) Mathias Funk (Germany) Reinhard Schroeck	5–7, 0–6	
Win	4–1	Aug 2019	Indonesia Open	G2/MT700	65+	Hard	(Indonesia) Solfianus Betaubun	(Indonesia) Hadiman (Indonesia) Samudra Sangitan	2–6, 6–4, [11–9]	
Win	5–1	Nov 2019	Victorian Seniors Championships, Australia	G5/MT100	65+	Hard	(Indonesia) Samuel Lucas Simon	(Australia) George Penney (Australia) Graeme Sticka	2–4, 4–2, [11–9]	
Win	5–1	Nov 2019	Victorian Seniors Championships, Australia	G5/MT100	65+	Hard	(Indonesia) Samuel Lucas Simon	(Indonesia) Hadiman (Indonesia) Hanny Suwandhani	6–4, 6–2	
Win	6–1	Jun 2024	MT200 Hakodate, Japan	MT200	70+	Carpet	(Indonesia) Samuel Lucas Simon	(Japan) Shuji Harada (Japan) Kazuhito Nishida	1–6, 6–4, [10–6]	
Loss	6–2	Jun 2025	MT400 Hakodate, Japan	MT400	70+	Carpet	(Indonesia) Samuel Lucas Simon	(Japan) Hidenori Ikeda (Japan) Noboru Yoshikawa	w/o	
Loss	6–3	Sep 2025	MT700 Istanbul, Turkey	MT700	70+	Clay	(Indonesia) Samuel Lucas Simon	(Turkey) Nejat Muldur (France) Alain Vaysset	3–6, 0–6	

== See also ==
- List of Indonesia Davis Cup team representatives
