= Ayi Sutarno =

Indonesian tennis player

- Country (sports): Indonesia

Singles

Grand Slam singles results
- French Open: Q1 (1977)
- Last updated on: 18 May 2009.

Ayi Sutarno
Medal record

Women's Tennis

Representing Indonesia

Asian Games
Bronze medal – third place	1978 Bangkok	Mixed Doubles

Ayi Sutarno is a former Indonesian tennis player. Sometimes she has been known as Aji Sutarno or Ayi Soetarno.

At the 1978 Asian Games in Bangkok, Ayi Sutarno won the bronze medal in the Mixed Doubles with partner Hadiman.
