= Rod Rafael =

Filipino tennis player (born 1960)

- Full name: Rodrigo Rafael
- Country (sports): Philippines
- Born: March 1, 1960 (age 65)

Singles
- Career record: 4–3 (Davis Cup)
- Highest ranking: No. 965 (15 May 1989)

Doubles
- Career record: 2–5 (Davis Cup)
Medal record
Southeast Asian Games
Silver medal – second place	1985 Bangkok	Mixed doubles
Silver medal – second place	1985 Bangkok	Men's team
Silver medal – second place	1987 Jakarta	Mixed doubles
Silver medal – second place	1987 Jakarta	Men's team
Silver medal – second place	1989 Kuala Lumpur	Men's team
Bronze medal – third place	1985 Bangkok	Men's singles

Rodrigo Rafael (born March 1, 1960) is a Filipino former tennis player. He now lives in New York.

Rafael trained out of the Olivarez Tennis Center in Parañaque and was active on the international tour in the 1980s.

Between 1985 and 1989 he featured in 10 ties for the Philippines Davis Cup team, winning four singles and two doubles rubbers. He was also a medalist for the Philippines in multiple editions of the Southeast Asian Games in the late 1980s.
