= Lukky Tedjamukti =

Indonesian tennis player

- Country (sports): Indonesia
- Born: 12 June 1967 (age 58)
- Turned pro: 1989
- Plays: Right-handed
- Prize money: US$7,065

Singles
- Career record: 20–22
- Career titles: 0
- Highest ranking: No. 418 (30 September 1991)

Doubles
- Career record: 29–24
- Career titles: 2 ITF
- Highest ranking: No. 314 (23 September 1991)

Team competitions
- Fed Cup: 2–3
Medal record
Asian Games
Bronze medal – third place	1990 Beijing	Women's Doubles

Lukky Tedjamukti (born 12 June 1967) is an Indonesian former professional tennis player.

She made her debut as a professional in March 1989, aged 21, at an ITF tournament in Jakarta. Tedjamukti has won two doubles titles on the ITF Women's Circuit. On 30 September 1991, she reached her best singles ranking of world No. 418. On 23 September 1991, she peaked at No. 314 in the WTA doubles rankings. In 1985, she played in the Wimbledon Junior Championships doubles and singles competitions, but lost both matches.

She was part of Indonesia's Fed Cup team in 1985, 1989, and 1990. Playing for Indonesia at the Fed Cup, Tedjamukti has accumulated a win–loss record of 2–3.

At the 1990 Asian Games at Beijing, Tedjamukti won the bronze medal in the Women's Doubles competition, partnered by Irawati Moerid.

== ITF Finals ==
=== Doubles (2–3) ===
$10,000 tournaments

Result	No.	Date	Location	Surface	Partner	Opponents	Score
Loss	1.	26 March 1989	Jakarta, Indonesia	Hard	(Indonesia) Agustina Wibisono	(Indonesia) Waya Walalangi (Indonesia) Suzanna Wibowo	2–6, 6–2, 1–6
Loss	2.	6 August 1989	Jakarta, Indonesia	Hard	(Indonesia) Patricia Budiono	(Indonesia) Yayuk Basuki (Indonesia) Suzanna Wibowo	6–4, 0–6, 3–6
Win	3.	18 June 1990	Semarang, Indonesia	Clay	(Netherlands) Colette Sely	(Indonesia) Irawati Iskandar (Indonesia) Tanti Trayono	6–4, 4–6, 7–6^{(3)}
Loss	4.	6 May 1991	Manila, Philippines	Hard	(Indonesia) Irawati Iskandar	(China) Li Fang (Hong Kong) Tang Min	6–7, 7–6, 6–7
Win	5.	9 September 1991	Bangkok, Thailand	Hard	(Indonesia) Irawati Iskandar	(China) Li Fang (Hong Kong) Tang Min	4–6, 7–5, 6–4
