= Manuel Valleramos =

Filipino tennis player

- Country (sports): Philippines

Singles
- Career record: 1–4 (Davis Cup)

Doubles
- Career record: 0–1 (Davis Cup)
Medal record
Southeast Asian Games
Gold medal – first place	1983 Singapore	Men's singles
Silver medal – second place	1979 Jakarta	Men's singles
Silver medal – second place	1983 Singapore	Men's team
Bronze medal – third place	1979 Jakarta	Mixed doubles
Bronze medal – third place	1979 Jakarta	Men's team
Bronze medal – third place	1981 Manila	Men's singles
Bronze medal – third place	1981 Manila	Men's doubles
Bronze medal – third place	1981 Manila	Men's team

Manuel Valleramos is a former Filipino tennis player.

Valleramos, the most successful out of three tennis playing brothers from Davao, was the Southeast Asian Games singles gold medalist in 1983. He was a member of the Philippines' 1978, 1982 and 1983 Davis Cup campaigns.
