= Thanakorn Srichaphan =

Thai tennis player and coach (born 1968)

- Country (sports): Thailand
- Born: 20 May 1968 (age 57) Khon Kaen, Thailand
- Plays: Right-handed

Singles
- Career record: 22–19 (ATP Tour/Davis Cup)
- Highest ranking: No. 673 (22 April 1991)

Doubles
- Career record: 5–6 (ATP Tour/Davis Cup)
- Highest ranking: No. 804 (22 April 1991)
Medal record
Asian Games
Bronze medal – third place	1986 Seoul	Men's Team
Southeast Asian Games
Gold medal – first place	1985 Bangkok	Men's Doubles
Gold medal – first place	1989 Kuala Lumpur	Mixed Doubles
Gold medal – first place	1989 Kuala Lumpur	Men's Team
Gold medal – first place	1991 Manila	Men's Team
Gold medal – first place	1995 Chiang Mai	Men's Doubles
Gold medal – first place	1995 Chiang Mai	Men's Team
Silver medal – second place	1991 Manila	Men's Doubles
Silver medal – second place	1995 Chiang Mai	Men's Singles
Bronze medal – third place	1985 Bangkok	Mixed doubles
Bronze medal – third place	1985 Bangkok	Men's Team
Bronze medal – third place	1987 Jakarta	Men's Team
Bronze medal – third place	1989 Kuala Lumpur	Men's Doubles
Bronze medal – third place	1995 Chiang Mai	Mixed Doubles

Thanakorn Srichaphan (born 20 May 1968) is a Thai tennis coach and former professional player. He has featured as both a player and captain on the Thailand Davis Cup team.

== Tennis career ==
The eldest of the Srichaphan brothers, he had a long Davis Cup career for Thailand, debuting in 1985. He was later joined in the team by brother Narathorn and missed out on playing with youngest brother Paradorn by a year, making his last appearance in 1997. His 27 Davis Cup ties for Thailand included wins in 22 singles rubbers.

Srichaphan was a regular competitor for Thailand at the Asian Games and Southeast Asian Games. A team bronze medalist at the 1986 Asian Games, he won multiple Southeast Asian Games gold medals in the doubles and team events. His best singles result was a silver medal at the 1995 Southeast Asian Games.

On the ATP Tour, Srichaphan made a main draw appearance as a wildcard at the 1996 Singapore Open.
