= Yolanda Soemarno =

Indonesian tennis player

- Full name: Yolanda Mangadil-Soemarno
- Country (sports): Indonesia
- Born: 30 July 1946 (age 78); North Sulawesi, Dutch East Indies

Singles

Grand Slam singles results
- French Open: Q2 (1975, 1977)
- Wimbledon: Q2 (1975, 1977)
Medal record
Asian Games
Bronze medal – third place	1978 Bangkok	Women's team

Yolanda Mangadil-Soemarno (born 30 July 1946) is a former tennis player.

Born in North Sulawesi, Soemarno played Federation Cup tennis for Indonesia between 1976 and 1981. She was the singles gold medalist at the 1977 Southeast Asian Games and won a team bronze medal at the 1978 Asian Games.

Soemarno's son (Aga) and one of her daughters (Tanya) were both professional tennis players.
