= Hadiman =

Indonesian tennis player

- Full name: Hadiman Hadiman
- Country (sports): Indonesia
- Born: 29 November 1950 (age 75)

Singles
- Career record: 1–1 (Grand Prix)

Doubles
- Career record: 0–1 (Grand Prix)
Medal record
Men's tennis
Representing Indonesia
Asian Games
Gold medal – first place	1978 Bangkok	Doubles
Gold medal – first place	1978 Bangkok	Team
Gold medal – first place	1982 New Delhi	Team
Bronze medal – third place	1978 Bangkok	Mixed doubles
SEA Games
Gold medal – first place	1977 Kuala Lumpur	Team
Gold medal – first place	1979 Jakarta	Team
Gold medal – first place	1981 Manila	Team
Gold medal – first place	1983 Singapore	Mixed doubles
Gold medal – first place	1983 Singapore	Team
Silver medal – second place	1977 Kuala Lumpur	Doubles
Silver medal – second place	1977 Kuala Lumpur	Mixed doubles
Silver medal – second place	1979 Jakarta	Doubles
Silver medal – second place	1979 Jakarta	Mixed doubles
Bronze medal – third place	1981 Manila	Mixed doubles
Bronze medal – third place	1983 Singapore	Doubles

Hadiman Hadiman (born 29 November 1950) is an Indonesian former professional tennis player.

Debuting in 1974, Hadiman competed for the Indonesia Davis Cup team in seven campaigns and was a member of the side which won the 1982 Eastern Zone, beating Japan in the final. His last appearance, a 1983 tie against Sweden, was Indonesia's first ever World Group fixture. He retired with a 3–4 overall win–loss record.

Hadiman won the men's doubles gold medal at the 1978 Asian Games, partnering Yustedjo Tarik.

== Career ==
=== Early career ===
Hadiman began competing in international tennis events in 1973, marking his entry into professional level play at the age of 22. Prior to this, Hadiman developed his skills within Indonesia's limited tennis infrastructure during the 1960s and early 1970s, though specific details on his initial exposure, local club involvement, or junior tournaments remain undocumented in available records. His early training likely occurred through national programs amid challenges such as scarce facilities and equipment in post-colonial Indonesia, paving the way for his Davis Cup participation.

=== ATP career and grand prix results ===
Hadiman's involvement in the ATP Tour and Grand Prix circuit was modest, reflecting the challenges faced by players from emerging tennis nations during the 1970s. His professional career on these circuits primarily spanned the mid-1970s, with limited appearances in international events. Official ATP records indicate an overall career win-loss of 2–2 in singles and doubles combined, with no titles captured and no prize money earned, underscoring his role as a pioneering figure for Indonesian tennis rather than a consistent tour contender.

In singles, Hadiman's Grand Prix record stands at 1–1. His sole win came in the 1973 Jakarta Open, a Grand Prix tournament held on hard courts from October 29 to November 4, where he defeated fellow Indonesian Yustedjo Tarik in the round of 32 with a score of 7–6, 1–6, 7–6. He advanced to the round of 16 but fell to West Germany's Jürgen Fassbender (then ranked No. 37) 0–6, 2–6 in a lopsided defeat. This performance marked one of his few forays into higher-level professional competition outside of team events.

Hadiman's doubles record on the Grand Prix circuit was 1–1, with no notable upsets or deep runs documented. He did not achieve an official ATP ranking during his active years, as his participation did not accumulate sufficient points under the era's system. These results highlight his competitive efforts against established international opponents, contributing to the gradual development of professional tennis in Indonesia.

== ITF Masters Tour ==
=== Singles: 8 (7 titles, 1 runner-up) ===
Legend Category World Championships Category MT1000 Category MT700 (2–0) Category MT400 (1–0) Category MT200 (1–0) Category MT100 (2–1)	Finals by surface Hard (2–0) Clay (3–0) Grass (0–0) Carpet (2–1)

Result	W–L	Date	Tournament	Tier	Age	Surface	Opponent	Score	Ref
Win	1–0	Oct 2017	Indonesia International Seniors Championships	G5/MT100	65+	Hard	(Spain) Juan Los Santos	6–3, 6–3	
Win	2–0	Dec 2017	Barcelona Cup, Spain	G5/MT100	65+	Clay	(Spain) Manuel Vicente Castro	6–1, 6–1	
Win	3–0	Apr 2019	International Tennis Point Open, Turkey	G4/MT200	65+	Clay	(Indonesia) Yustedjo Tarik	6–4, 7–6^{(3)}	
Win	4–0	Aug 2019	Indonesia Open	G2/MT700	65+	Hard	(Indonesia) Yustedjo Tarik	6–3, 6–2	
Win	5–0	Nov 2019	Victorian Seniors Championships, Australia	G2/MT700	65+	Clay	(Indonesia) Yustedjo Tarik	6–1, 6–2	
Loss	5–1	Jun 2026	MT100 Hakodate, Japan	MT100	75+	Carpet	(Indonesia) Samuel Lucas Simon	1–4, 2–4	
Win	6–1	Jun 2026	MT200 Hakodate, Japan	MT200	75+	Carpet	(Japan) Hiroshi Ayuba	6–2, 6–0	
Win	7–1	Jun 2026	MT400 Hakodate, Japan	MT400	75+	Carpet	(Japan) Toshiki Miyaji	6–1, 6–1	

=== Doubles: 6 (2 titles, 4 runner-ups) ===
Legend Category World Championships Category MT1000 Category MT700 (0–1) Category MT400 (0–1) Category MT200 (0–2) Category MT100 (2–0)	Finals by surface Hard (1–1) Clay (1–1) Grass (0–0) Carpet (0–2)

Result	W–L	Date	Tournament	Tier	Age	Surface	Partner	Opponent	Score	Ref
Win	1–0	Oct 2017	Indonesia International Seniors Championships	G5/MT 100	65+	Hard	(Indonesia) Atet Wijono	(Indonesia) Husni Madjid (Indonesia) Samudra Sangitan	6–1, 6–2	
Win	2–0	Dec 2017	Barcelona Cup, Spain	G5/MT 100	65+	Clay	(Indonesia) Hasbullah Tahir	(Indonesia) Andi Mallarangeng (Indonesia) Hasrullah Tahir	7–5, 6–4	
Loss	2–1	Apr 2019	International Tennis Point Open, Turkey	G4/MT200	65+	Clay	(Netherlands) Willy Halim	(Indonesia) Samuel Lucas Simon (Indonesia) Yustedjo Tarik	2–6, 2–6	
Loss	2–2	Aug 2019	Indonesia Open	G2/MT700	65+	Hard	(Indonesia) Samudra Sangitan	(Indonesia) Solfianus Betaubun (Indonesia) Yustedjo Tarik	6–2, 4–6, [9–11]	
Loss	2–3	Jun 2026	MT200 Hakodate, Japan	MT200	60+	Carpet	(Indonesia) Samuel Lucas Simon	(Japan) Yoshinori Dobashi (Japan) Koudou Takahashi	6–2, 6–7^{(8)}, [5–10]	
Loss	2–4	Jun 2026	MT400 Hakodate, Japan	MT400	70+	Carpet	(Indonesia) Samuel Lucas Simon	(Japan) Yuichi Makimura (Japan) Toshiaki Tanaka	1–6, 3–6	

== See also ==
- List of Indonesia Davis Cup team representatives
