= Woraphol Thongkhamchu =

Thai tennis player

- Country (sports): Thailand
- Born: 1 January 1968 (age 58)

Singles
- Career record: 31–14 (Davis Cup)
- Highest ranking: No. 649 (10 Sep 1990)

Doubles
- Career record: 5–3 (Davis Cup)
- Highest ranking: No. 792 (7 Jul 1986)
Medal record
Asian Games
Bronze medal – third place	1986 Seoul	Men's team

Woraphol Thongkhamchu (Thai: วรพล ทองคำชู; born 1 January 1968) is a Thai former professional tennis player active on the international tour in the 1980s and 1990s. He is now a police Lieutenant Colonel.

Thongkhamchu represented the Thailand Davis Cup team every year from 1986 to 1997, featuring in a total of 27 ties for his country. He registered 36 wins overall, of which 31 came in singles rubbers, with his best win coming against New Zealand's Kelly Evernden in 1987.

Outside of the Davis Cup, Thongkhamchu also represented Thailand regionally at the Asian Games and Southeast Asian Games. He was the Southeast Asian Games men's singles champion in 1989 and 1995.
