= Donny Susetyo =

Indonesian tennis player

- Country (sports): Indonesia
- Born: 28 March 1974 (age 51)
- Height: 5 ft 7 in (170 cm)

Singles
- Career record: 0–1 (ATP Tour)
- Highest ranking: No. 677 (10 October 1994)

Doubles
- Career record: 0–3 (ATP Tour)
- Highest ranking: No. 528 (14 August 1995)

Donny Susetyo (born 28 March 1974) is an Indonesian former professional tennis player.

Susetyo represented Indonesia in various multi-sport events during his career and played in four Davis Cup ties for Indonesia as a doubles player. He competed for Indonesia at the 1993 Universiade, won three medals at the 1993 Southeast Asian Games and two medals at the 1994 Asian Games.

While competing on the professional tennis tour, Susetyo had a best singles ranking of 677 in the world and appeared in the main draw of the 1995 edition of the Indonesia Open.

== See also ==
- List of Indonesia Davis Cup team representatives
