= Donald Wailan-Walalangi =

Indonesian tennis player (born 1960)

Donald Wailan-Walalangi (born 14 April 1960) is a retired tennis player from Indonesia, who represented his native country at the 1988 Summer Olympics in Seoul, South Korea. There he lost in the first round of the men's doubles competition to USA's eventual gold medalists Ken Flach and Robert Seguso, while partnering Suharyadi Suharyadi.
