= 1984 Davis Cup Eastern Zone =

International tennis competition

The Eastern Zone was one of the three regional zones of the 1984 Davis Cup.

12 teams entered the Eastern Zone in total, with the winner promoted to the following year's World Group. Japan defeated Pakistan in the final and qualified for the 1985 World Group.

== Participating nations ==
- China
- Chinese Taipei
- Hong Kong
- Indonesia
- Japan
- Malaysia
- Pakistan
- Philippines
- South Korea
- Singapore
- Sri Lanka
- Thailand

=== Draw ===
First round 13–15 January
Indonesia
bye
Karachi, Pakistan (indoor hard)
Pakistan	4
Malaysia	1
Thailand
bye
Taipei, Taiwan (indoor hard)
Hong Kong	3
Chinese Taipei	2
Guangzhou, China (indoor hard)
Sri Lanka	1
China	4
bye
South Korea
Singapore (hard)
Philippines	5
Singapore	0
bye
Japan

Quarterfinals; 2–4 March
Rawalpindi, Pakistan (clay)
Indonesia	1
Pakistan	4
Causeway Bay, Hong Kong (hard)
Thailand	5
Hong Kong	0
Kunming, China (indoor clay)
China	3
South Korea	1
Fukuoka, Japan (indoor hard)
Philippines	0
Japan	5

Semifinals; 4–6 May
Rawalpindi, Pakistan (clay)
Pakistan	4
Thailand	1
Kunming, China (indoor clay)
China	2
Japan	3

Final; 28–30 September
Rawalpindi, Pakistan (clay)
Pakistan	1
Japan	4

== First round ==
=== Pakistan vs. Malaysia ===
Pakistan
4
K.M.C. Stadium, Karachi, Pakistan
13–15 January 1984
Hard (indoors)

Malaysia
1

			1	2	3	4	5
1	(Pakistan) (Malaysia)	Islam-ul-Haq; Selvarajoo Selvarajoo	6; 3	6; 3	6; 3
2	(Pakistan) (Malaysia)	Hamed-ul-Haq; Adam Malik	6; 1	6; 4	6; 2
3	(Pakistan) (Malaysia)	Nasir Munir-Ahmed / Islam-ul-Haq; Mulari Dharan / Adam Malik	7; 5	6; 2	7; 9	5; 7	4; 6
4	(Pakistan) (Malaysia)	Hamed-ul-Haq; Selvarajoo Selvarajoo	6; 1	6; 1	6; 3
5	(Pakistan) (Malaysia)	Rashid Malik; Adam Malik	4; 6	6; 4	6; 0

=== Chinese Taipei vs. Hong Kong ===
Chinese Taipei
2
Taipei, Taiwan
13–15 January 1984
Hard (indoors)

Hong Kong
3

			1	2	3	4	5
1	(Chinese Taipei) (Hong Kong)	Wu Chang-rung; Kelvin Ng	6; 2	6; 3	5; 7	6; 3
2	(Chinese Taipei) (Hong Kong)	Liu Chung-hsing; Mark Bailey	6; 3	3; 6	6; 3	1; 6	4; 6
3	(Chinese Taipei) (Hong Kong)	Liu Chung-hsing / Wu Chang-rung; Randall King / Kelvin Ng	1; 6	6; 4	4; 6	6; 8
4	(Chinese Taipei) (Hong Kong)	Wu Chang-rung; Mark Bailey	6; 4	5; 7	6; 2	6; 2
5	(Chinese Taipei) (Hong Kong)	Liu Chung-hsing; Kelvin Ng	3; 6	5; 7	2; 6

=== China vs. Sri Lanka ===
China
4
Guangzhou, China
13–15 January 1984
Hard (indoors)

Sri Lanka
1

			1	2	3	4	5
1	(China) (Sri Lanka)	Liu Shuhua; Arjun Fernando	4; 6	6; 2	8; 6	6; 3
2	(China) (Sri Lanka)	You Wei; Frank Sebaratnam	6; 3	6; 1	6; 4
3	(China) (Sri Lanka)	Liu Shuhua / Ma Keqin; Arjun Fernando / Frank Sebaratnam	6; 4	6; 4	6; 1
4	(China) (Sri Lanka)	Liu Shuhua; Arjun Fernando	3; 6	3; 6
5	(China) (Sri Lanka)	Ma Keqin; Arjun Perera	6; 0	6; 1

=== Singapore vs. Philippines ===
Singapore
0
Singapore National Centre, Singapore
13–15 January 1984
Hard

Philippines
5

			1	2	3	4	5
1	(Singapore) (Philippines)	Albert Teo; Ody Gabriel	3; 6	3; 6	3; 6
2	(Singapore) (Philippines)	Mahader Hassan; Felix Barrientos	6; 8	1; 6	3; 6
3	(Singapore) (Philippines)	Victor Pereira / Albert Teo; Felix Barrientos / Antonio del Rosario	3; 6	4; 6	8; 6	6; 3	1; 6
4	(Singapore) (Philippines)	Albert Teo; Felix Barrientos	2; 6	4; 6	3; 6
5	(Singapore) (Philippines)	Mahader Hassan; Antonio del Rosario	5; 7	0; 6	2; 6

== Quarterfinals ==
=== Pakistan vs. Indonesia ===
Pakistan
4
Rawalpindi, Pakistan
2–4 March 1984
Clay

Indonesia
1

			1	2	3	4	5
1	(Pakistan) (Indonesia)	Hamed-ul-Haq; Hary Suharyadi	3; 6	7; 9	6; 4	6; 1	7; 5
2	(Pakistan) (Indonesia)	Islam-ul-Haq; Tintus Arianto Wibowo	6; 3	8; 6	6; 1
3	(Pakistan) (Indonesia)	Nasir Munir-Ahmed / Islam-ul-Haq; Donald Wailan Walalangi / Ludi Wijono	6; 3	4; 6	3; 6	2; 6
4	(Pakistan) (Indonesia)	Islam-ul-Haq; Hary Suharyadi	3; 6	8; 6	7; 5	8; 6
5	(Pakistan) (Indonesia)	Rashid Malik; Ludi Wijono	6; 2	6; 2

=== Hong Kong vs. Thailand ===
Hong Kong
0
Victoria Park, Causeway Bay, Hong Kong
2–4 March 1984
Hard

Thailand
5

			1	2	3	4	5
1	(Hong Kong) (Thailand)	Randall King; Sombat Uamongkol	6; 4	6; 8	6; 8	6; 1	4; 6
2	(Hong Kong) (Thailand)	Kelvin Ng; Panomkorn Pladchurnil	8; 6	3; 6	4; 6	4; 6
3	(Hong Kong) (Thailand)	Randall King / Kelvin Ng; Panomkorn Pladchurnil / Sombat Uamongkol	3; 6	6; 3	11; 9	3; 6	2; 6
4	(Hong Kong) (Thailand)	Randall King; Panomkorn Pladchurnil	6; 8	8; 6	1; 6
5	(Hong Kong) (Thailand)	Kelvin Ng; Sombat Uamongkol	3; 6	6; 1	1; 6

=== China vs. South Korea ===
China
3
Kunming, China
2–4 March 1984
Clay (indoors)

South Korea
1

			1	2	3	4	5
1	(China) (South Korea)	You Wei; Song Dong-wook	7; 5	6; 1	4; 6	3; 6	6; 3
2	(China) (South Korea)	Liu Shuhua; Kim Choon-ho	6; 1	6; 2	6; 4
3	(China) (South Korea)	Liu Shuhua / Ma Keqin; Kim Bong-soo / Yoo Jin-sun	6; 1	6; 8	3; 6	2; 6
4	(China) (South Korea)	You Wei; Kim Choon-ho	6; 4	1; 6	0; 6	6; 4	6; 0
5	(China) (South Korea)	Liu Shuhua; Song Dong-wook						not played

=== Japan vs. Philippines ===
Japan
5
Kyushu International Tennis Centre, Fukuoka, Japan
2–4 March 1984
Hard (indoors)

Philippines
0

			1	2	3	4	5
1	(Japan) (Philippines)	Shozo Shiraishi; Manny Tolentino	6; 1	6; 1	6; 1
2	(Japan) (Philippines)	Tsuyoshi Fukui; Beeyong Sison	6; 0	4; 6	6; 3	7; 5
3	(Japan) (Philippines)	Hitoshi Shirato / Toru Yonezawa; Ody Gabriel / Beeyong Sison	8; 6	7; 5	6; 4
4	(Japan) (Philippines)	Tsuyoshi Fukui; Felix Barrientos	6; 2	6; 1
5	(Japan) (Philippines)	Shozo Shiraishi; Beeyong Sison	6; 4	7; 5

== Semifinals ==
=== Pakistan vs. Thailand ===
Pakistan
4
Rawalpindi, Pakistan
4–6 May 1984
Clay

Thailand
1

			1	2	3	4	5
1	(Pakistan) (Thailand)	Islam-ul-Haq; Panomkorn Pladchurnil	4; 6	1; 6	6; 3	6; 1	6; 2
2	(Pakistan) (Thailand)	Hamed-ul-Haq; Sombat Uamongkol	4; 6	8; 6	4; 6	6; 1	6; 1
3	(Pakistan) (Thailand)	Rashid Malik / Islam-ul-Haq; Panomkorn Pladchurnil / Sombat Uamongkol	3; 6	4; 6	4; 6
4	(Pakistan) (Thailand)	Hamed-ul-Haq; Panomkorn Pladchurnil	6; 2	6; 4	6; 4
5	(Pakistan) (Thailand)	Islam-ul-Haq; Sombat Uamongkol	12; 10	6; 2	6; 1

=== China vs. Japan ===
China
2
Kunming, China
4–6 May 1984
Clay (indoors)

Japan
3

			1	2	3	4	5
1	(China) (Japan)	Liu Shuhua; Tsuyoshi Fukui	6; 4	6; 4	2; 6	10; 12	5; 7
2	(China) (Japan)	You Wei; Shozo Shiraishi	4; 6	6; 2	1; 6	4; 6
3	(China) (Japan)	Liu Shuhua / Ma Keqin; Hitoshi Shirato / Toshiyuki Tsuji	0; 6	2; 6	6; 2	6; 4	6; 0
4	(China) (Japan)	You Wei; Tsuyoshi Fukui	5; 7	8; 10	2; 6
5	(China) (Japan)	Liu Shuhua; Shozo Shiraishi	6; 1	6; 2

== Final ==
=== Pakistan vs. Japan ===
Pakistan
1
Rawalpindi, Pakistan
28–30 September 1984
Clay

Japan
4

			1	2	3	4	5
1	(Pakistan) (Japan)	Islam-ul-Haq; Shozo Shiraishi	5; 7	1; 6	2; 6
2	(Pakistan) (Japan)	Hamed-ul-Haq; Tsuyoshi Fukui	0; 6	2; 6	1; 6
3	(Pakistan) (Japan)	Haseeb Aslam / Mushaf Zia; Shigeyuki Nishio / Shinichi Sakamoto	6; 2	3; 6	4; 6	4; 6
4	(Pakistan) (Japan)	Islam-ul-Haq; Tsuyoshi Fukui	0; 6	2; 6
5	(Pakistan) (Japan)	Hamed-ul-Haq; Shozo Shiraishi	4; 6	7; 5	7; 5
