= 1986 Davis Cup Eastern Zone =

International tennis competition

The Eastern Zone was one of the three regional zones of the 1986 Davis Cup.

13 teams entered the Eastern Zone in total, with the winner promoted to the following year's World Group. South Korea defeated Japan in the final and qualified for the 1987 World Group.

== Participating nations ==
- Bangladesh
- China
- Chinese Taipei
- Hong Kong
- Indonesia
- Japan
- Malaysia
- Pakistan
- Philippines
- South Korea
- Singapore
- Sri Lanka
- Thailand

=== Draw ===
First round 7–9 March
Japan
bye
Singapore (grass)
Singapore	0
Chinese Taipei	3
China
bye
Kuala Lumpur, Malaysia (indoor carpet)
Hong Kong	3
Malaysia	2
Bangkok, Thailand (hard)
Bangladesh	0
Thailand	5
Jakarta, Indonesia (clay)
Indonesia	4
Philippines	1
Lahore, Pakistan (clay)
Pakistan	3
Sri Lanka	2
bye
South Korea

Quarterfinals; 9–11 May
Matsuyama, Japan (hard)
Japan	4
Chinese Taipei	1
Causeway Bay, Hong Kong (hard)
China	3
Hong Kong	0
Bangkok, Thailand (hard)
Thailand	4
Indonesia	0
Seoul, South Korea (clay)
Pakistan	1
South Korea	4

Semifinals; 18–20 July
Kumamoto, Japan (indoor carpet)
Japan	4
China	1
Seoul, South Korea (clay)
Thailand	0
South Korea	5

Final; 6–8 October
Seoul, South Korea (hard)
Japan	1
South Korea	4

== First round ==
=== Singapore vs. Chinese Taipei ===
Singapore
0
Singapore Cricket Club, Singapore
7–9 March 1986
Grass

Chinese Taipei
3

			1	2	3	4	5
1	(Singapore) (Chinese Taipei)	Victor Pereira; Wu Chang-rung	2; 6	0; 6	2; 6
2	(Singapore) (Chinese Taipei)	Mahader Hassan; Liu Chung-hsing	3; 6	7; 9	2; 6
3	(Singapore) (Chinese Taipei)	Mahader Hassan / Victor Pereira; Hsu Huang-jung / Wu Chang-rung	6; 3	7; 9	4; 6	2; 6
4	(Singapore) (Chinese Taipei)	Mahader Hassan; Wu Chang-rung						not played
5	(Singapore) (Chinese Taipei)	Victor Pereira; Liu Chung-hsing

=== Malaysia vs. Hong Kong ===
Malaysia
2
Stadium Negara, Kuala Lumpur, Malaysia
7–9 March 1986
Carpet (indoors)

Hong Kong
3

			1	2	3	4	5
1	(Malaysia) (Hong Kong)	Adam Malik; Colin Grant	12; 10	4; 6	6; 2	6; 3
2	(Malaysia) (Hong Kong)	Yeo Kian-wah; Mark Bailey	1; 6	1; 6	1; 6
3	(Malaysia) (Hong Kong)	Chow Chin-chuan / Adam Malik; Mark Bailey / Randall King	6; 3	5; 7	7; 5	4; 6	4; 6
4	(Malaysia) (Hong Kong)	Adam Malik; Mark Bailey	6; 4	3; 6	6; 2	6; 1
5	(Malaysia) (Hong Kong)	Yeo Kian-wah; Colin Grant	2; 6	2; 6	2; 6

=== Thailand vs. Bangladesh ===
Thailand
5
Bangkok, Thailand
7–9 March 1986
Hard

Bangladesh
0

			1	2	3	4	5
1	(Thailand) (Bangladesh)	Panomkorn Pladchurnil; Ifthekar Sardar	6; 3	6; 0	6; 1
2	(Thailand) (Bangladesh)	Woraphol Thongkhamchu; Shovon Jamaly	6; 3	6; 0	6; 2
3	(Thailand) (Bangladesh)	Tanakorn Srichaphan / Woraphol Thongkhamchu; Ifthekar Sardar / Shovon Jamaly	6; 2	6; 1	6; 4
4	(Thailand) (Bangladesh)	Woraphol Thongkhamchu; Ifthekar Sardar	6; 3	6; 2
5	(Thailand) (Bangladesh)	Tanakorn Srichaphan; Shovon Jamaly	6; 3	6; 1

=== Indonesia vs. Philippines ===
Indonesia
4
Jakarta, Indonesia
7–9 March 1986
Clay

Philippines
1

			1	2	3	4	5
1	(Indonesia) (Philippines)	Sulistyono; Rodrigo Rafael	0; 6	5; 7	3; 6
2	(Indonesia) (Philippines)	Tintus Arianto Wibowo; Roland So	6; 3	8; 6	6; 3
3	(Indonesia) (Philippines)	Sulistyono / Donald Wailan-Walalangi; Rodrigo Rafael / Raymundo Suarez	6; 4	7; 5	3; 6	6; 4
4	(Indonesia) (Philippines)	Tintus Arianto Wibowo; Rodrigo Rafael	4; 6	6; 2	6; 4	6; 4
5	(Indonesia) (Philippines)	Sulistyono; Roselle Natividad	6; 2	7; 5

=== Pakistan vs. Sri Lanka ===
Pakistan
3
Lahore, Pakistan
7–9 March 1986
Clay

Sri Lanka
2

			1	2	3	4	5
1	(Pakistan) (Sri Lanka)	Hamed-ul-Haq; Arjun Fernando	4; 6	6; 4	4; 6	3; 6
2	(Pakistan) (Sri Lanka)	Rashid Malik; Arjun Perera	9; 11	6; 2	6; 4	6; 3
3	(Pakistan) (Sri Lanka)	Rashid Malik / Mushaf Zia; Arjun Fernando / Arjun Perera	7; 5	3; 6	7; 5	4; 6	3; 6
4	(Pakistan) (Sri Lanka)	Rashid Malik; Arjun Fernando	8; 6	6; 3	2; 6	6; 4
5	(Pakistan) (Sri Lanka)	Hamed-ul-Haq; Arjun Perera	6; 3	7; 5	6; 3

== Quarterfinals ==
=== Japan vs. Chinese Taipei ===
Japan
4
Pan Tennis Club, Matsuyama, Japan
9–11 May 1986
Hard

Chinese Taipei
1

			1	2	3	4	5
1	(Japan) (Chinese Taipei)	Toshihisa Tsuchihashi; Liu Chung-hsing	6; 2	6; 0	8; 6
2	(Japan) (Chinese Taipei)	Tsuyoshi Fukui; Wu Chang-rung	7; 5	6; 4	6; 4
3	(Japan) (Chinese Taipei)	Hitoshi Shirato / Eiji Takeuchi; Hsu Huang-jung / Wu Chang-rung	6; 1	6; 4	7; 5
4	(Japan) (Chinese Taipei)	Toshihisa Tsuchihashi; Wu Chang-rung	6; 4	0; 6	5; 7
5	(Japan) (Chinese Taipei)	Tsuyoshi Fukui; Liu Chung-hsing	6; 2	6; 2

=== Hong Kong vs. China ===
Hong Kong
0
Victoria Park, Causeway Bay, Hong Kong
9–11 May 1986
Hard

China
3

			1	2	3	4	5
1	(Hong Kong) (China)	Mark Bailey; Liu Shuhua	3; 6	3; 6	2; 6
2	(Hong Kong) (China)	Kelvin Ng; You Wei	1; 6	1; 6	4; 6
3	(Hong Kong) (China)	Randall King / Kelvin Ng; Liu Shuhua / You Wei	2; 6	5; 7	10; 8	5; 7
4	(Hong Kong) (China)	Kelvin Ng; Liu Shuhua						not played
5	(Hong Kong) (China)	Mark Bailey; You Wei						not played

=== Thailand vs. Indonesia ===
Thailand
4
Bangkok, Thailand
9–11 May 1986
Hard

Indonesia
0

			1	2	3	4	5
1	(Thailand) (Indonesia)	Woraphol Thongkhamchu; Hary Suharyadi	4; 6	8; 6	6; 4	6; 0
2	(Thailand) (Indonesia)	Sombat Uamongkol; Tintus Arianto Wibowo	5; 7	2; 6	7; 5	6; 3	6; 4
3	(Thailand) (Indonesia)	Tanakorn Srichaphan / Woraphol Thongkhamchu; Sulistyono / Donald Wailan-Walalangi	6; 3	6; 4	3; 6	6; 4
4	(Thailand) (Indonesia)	Sombat Uamongkol; Hary Suharyadi	6; 1					retired
5	(Thailand) (Indonesia)	Woraphol Thongkhamchu; Tintus Arianto Wibowo						not played

=== South Korea vs. Pakistan ===
South Korea
4
Jang Choong Tennis Centre, Seoul, South Korea
9–11 May 1986
Clay

Pakistan
1

			1	2	3	4	5
1	(South Korea) (Pakistan)	Yoo Jin-sun; Rashid Malik	6; 3	6; 0	6; 4
2	(South Korea) (Pakistan)	Kim Bong-soo; Haseeb Aslam	6; 3	9; 7	6; 4
3	(South Korea) (Pakistan)	Jeon Young-dai / Song Dong-wook; Rashid Malik / Mushaf Zia	6; 3	4; 6	6; 3
4	(South Korea) (Pakistan)	Kim Bong-soo; Rashid Malik	6; 3	6; 4
5	(South Korea) (Pakistan)	Yoo Jin-sun; Haseeb Aslam	3; 6	4; 6

== Semifinals ==
=== Japan vs. China ===
Japan
4
Kumamoto Prefectural Gymnasium, Kumamoto, Japan
18–20 July 1986
Carpet (indoors)

China
1

			1	2	3	4	5
1	(Japan) (China)	Eiji Takeuchi; Ma Keqin	9; 7	8; 10	5; 7	3; 6
2	(Japan) (China)	Tsuyoshi Fukui; Liu Shuhua	1; 6	6; 3	6; 1	6; 0
3	(Japan) (China)	Hitoshi Shirato / Eiji Takeuchi; Xie Zhao / You Wei	7; 5	7; 5	6; 3
4	(Japan) (China)	Tsuyoshi Fukui; Ma Keqin	6; 3	6; 4	6; 2
5	(Japan) (China)	Eiji Takeuchi; Liu Shuhua	7; 5	12; 10

=== South Korea vs. Thailand ===
South Korea
5
Jang Choong Tennis Centre, Seoul, South Korea
18–20 July 1986
Clay

Thailand
0

			1	2	3	4	5
1	(South Korea) (Thailand)	Roh Gap-taik; Sombat Uamongkol	6; 4	6; 1	7; 9	10; 8
2	(South Korea) (Thailand)	Yoo Jin-sun; Tanakorn Srichaphan	8; 6	6; 2	4; 6	6; 0
3	(South Korea) (Thailand)	Song Dong-wook / Yoo Jin-sun; Tanakorn Srichaphan / Sombat Uamongkol	6; 4	6; 3	6; 4
4	(South Korea) (Thailand)	Song Dong-wook; Vittaya Samrej	6; 1	6; 2
5	(South Korea) (Thailand)	Roh Gap-taik; Tanakorn Srichaphan	6; 3	8; 10	6; 2

== Final ==
=== South Korea vs. Japan ===
South Korea
4
Seoul, South Korea
6–8 October 1986
Hard

Japan
1

			1	2	3	4	5
1	(South Korea) (Japan)	Song Dong-wook; Shozo Shiraishi	6; 4	6; 2	6; 4
2	(South Korea) (Japan)	Yoo Jin-sun; Tsuyoshi Fukui	6; 3	6; 1	6; 3
3	(South Korea) (Japan)	Song Dong-wook / Yoo Jin-sun; Hitoshi Shirato / Eiji Takeuchi	4; 6	6; 1	6; 4	6; 2
4	(South Korea) (Japan)	Yoo Jin-sun; Shozo Shiraishi	4; 6	6; 4	6; 4
5	(South Korea) (Japan)	Song Dong-wook; Tsuyoshi Fukui	3; 6	3; 6
