= 1983 Davis Cup Eastern Zone =

International tennis competition

The Eastern Zone was one of the three regional zones of the 1983 Davis Cup.

10 teams entered the Eastern Zone in total, with the winner promoted to the following year's World Group. India defeated Japan in the final and qualified for the 1984 World Group.

== Participating nations ==
- China
- Chinese Taipei
- Hong Kong
- India
- Japan
- Malaysia
- Philippines
- South Korea
- Sri Lanka
- Thailand

=== Draw ===
First round 14–16 January
India
bye
Colombo, Sri Lanka (clay)
Sri Lanka	3
Hong Kong	2
Thailand
bye
bye
Chinese Taipei
Manila, Philippines (indoor clay)
Philippines	5
Malaysia	0
bye
South Korea
China
bye
bye
Japan

Quarterfinals; 4–6 March
Colombo, Sri Lanka (clay)
India	4
Sri Lanka	1
Taipei, Taiwan (indoor hard)
Thailand	3
Chinese Taipei	2
Seoul, South Korea (clay)
Philippines	1
South Korea	4
Osaka, Japan (hard)
China	2
Japan	3

Semifinals; 6–8 May
New Delhi, India (grass)
India	5
Thailand	0
Nagoya, Japan (hard)
South Korea	1
Japan	4

Final; 30 September–2 October
Tokyo, Japan (hard)
India	3
Japan	2

== First round ==
=== Sri Lanka vs. Hong Kong ===
Sri Lanka
3
Sri Lanka Tennis Association, Colombo, Sri Lanka
14–16 January 1983
Clay

Hong Kong
2

			1	2	3	4	5
1	(Sri Lanka) (Hong Kong)	Arjun Fernando; Mark Bailey	5; 7	3; 6	5; 7
2	(Sri Lanka) (Hong Kong)	Frank Sebaratnam; Kelvin Ng	2; 6	6; 2	6; 1			retired
3	(Sri Lanka) (Hong Kong)	Arjun Fernando / Frank Sebaratnam; Mark Bailey / Pang Chi-yuen	6; 4	3; 6	4; 6	6; 4	6; 1
4	(Sri Lanka) (Hong Kong)	Frank Sebaratnam; Mark Bailey	7; 5	3; 6	2; 6	6; 4	6; 4
5	(Sri Lanka) (Hong Kong)	Arjun Perera; Paul Bailey	2; 6	4; 6	2; 6

=== Philippines vs. Malaysia ===
Philippines
5
Rizal Memorial Coliseum, Manila, Philippines
14–16 January 1983
Clay (indoors)

Malaysia
0

			1	2	3	4	5
1	(Philippines) (Malaysia)	Ody Gabriel; Adam Malik	6; 4	6; 0	6; 2
2	(Philippines) (Malaysia)	Romeo Rafon; Roy ANchant	6; 0	6; 0	6; 0
3	(Philippines) (Malaysia)	Enrique Capulong / Raymundo Suarez; Adam Malik / Abdul-Rahman Ramlal	6; 3	7; 9	6; 2	7; 5
4	(Philippines) (Malaysia)	Ody Gabriel; Abdul-Rahman Ramlal	6; 2	6; 1
5	(Philippines) (Malaysia)	Romeo Rafon; Adam Malik	6; 0	6; 0

== Quarterfinals ==
=== Sri Lanka vs. India ===
Sri Lanka
1
Sri Lanka Tennis Association, Colombo, Sri Lanka
4–6 March 1983
Clay

India
4

			1	2	3	4	5
1	(Sri Lanka) (India)	Frank Sebaratnam; Sashi Menon	0; 6	1; 6	3; 6
2	(Sri Lanka) (India)	Arjun Fernando; Vijay Amritraj	3; 6	1; 6	4; 6
3	(Sri Lanka) (India)	Arjun Fernando / Frank Sebaratnam; Anand Amritraj / Vijay Amritraj	2; 6	4; 6	1; 6
4	(Sri Lanka) (India)	Frank Sebaratnam; Srinivasan Vasudevan	1; 6	2; 6	0; 6
5	(Sri Lanka) (India)	Arjun Fernando; Sashi Menon	4; 6	2; 1				retired

=== Chinese Taipei vs. Thailand ===
Chinese Taipei
2
Taipei, Taiwan
4–6 March 1983
Hard (indoors)

Thailand
3

			1	2	3	4	5
1	(Chinese Taipei) (Thailand)	Wu Chang-rung; Panomkorn Pladchurnil	6; 2	8; 10	6; 4	4; 6	6; 4
2	(Chinese Taipei) (Thailand)	Hsu Huang-jung; Sombat Uamongkol	6; 4	4; 6	2; 6	5; 7
3	(Chinese Taipei) (Thailand)	Hsu Huang-jung / Wu Chang-rung; Panomkorn Pladchurnil / Sombat Uamongkol	3; 6	2; 6	4; 6
4	(Chinese Taipei) (Thailand)	Wu Chang-rung; Sombat Uamongkol	4; 6	6; 4	6; 2	4; 6	6; 2
5	(Chinese Taipei) (Thailand)	Hsu Huang-jung; Panomkorn Pladchurnil	6; 4	4; 6	6; 2	1; 6	1; 6

=== South Korea vs. Philippines ===
South Korea
4
Tong Dae Mun Stadium, Seoul, South Korea
4–6 March 1983
Clay

Philippines
1

			1	2	3	4	5
1	(South Korea) (Philippines)	Jeon Young-dai; Beeyong Sison	6; 1	6; 4	8; 6
2	(South Korea) (Philippines)	Kim Choon-ho; Romeo Rafon	8; 6	6; 3	6; 0
3	(South Korea) (Philippines)	Lee Woo-ryong / Song Dong-wook; Ody Gabriel / Beeyong Sison	11; 9	6; 3	9; 7
4	(South Korea) (Philippines)	Song Dong-wook; Manuel Valleramos	6; 2	6; 2
5	(South Korea) (Philippines)	Kim Choon-ho; Beeyong Sison	8; 10	3; 6

=== Japan vs. China ===
Japan
3
Utsubo Tennis Center, Osaka, Japan
4–6 March 1983
Hard

China
2

			1	2	3	4	5
1	(Japan) (China)	Tsuyoshi Fukui; Li Shiqin	6; 0	6; 0	6; 1
2	(Japan) (China)	Hitoshi Shirato; Liu Shuhua	6; 8	3; 6	6; 3	6; 4	4; 6
3	(Japan) (China)	Hitoshi Shirato / Toru Yonezawa; Liu Shuhua / Ma Keqin	4; 6	3; 6	6; 1	6; 4	5; 7
4	(Japan) (China)	Tsuyoshi Fukui; Liu Shuhua	6; 2	6; 2	6; 2
5	(Japan) (China)	Hitoshi Shirato; Li Shiqin	6; 2	7; 5	6; 4

== Semifinals ==
=== India vs. Thailand ===
India
5
New Delhi, India
6–8 May 1983
Grass

Thailand
0

			1	2	3	4	5
1	(India) (Thailand)	Vijay Amritraj; Sombat Uamongkol	6; 4	6; 0	6; 3
2	(India) (Thailand)	Sashi Menon; Supot Meesawat	7; 5	6; 2	6; 0
3	(India) (Thailand)	Anand Amritraj / Vijay Amritraj; Supot Meesawat / Sombat Uamongkol	6; 1	6; 2	6; 0
4	(India) (Thailand)	Sashi Menon; Sombat Uamongkol	7; 5	6; 3
5	(India) (Thailand)	Nandan Bal; Supot Meesawat	6; 4	9; 7

=== Japan vs. South Korea ===
Japan
4
Green Tennis Club, Nagoya, Japan
6–8 May 1983
Hard

South Korea
1

			1	2	3	4	5
1	(Japan) (South Korea)	Tsuyoshi Fukui; Song Dong-wook	2; 6	6; 2	6; 1	7; 5
2	(Japan) (South Korea)	Hitoshi Shirato; Lee Woo-ryong	4; 6	6; 1	6; 4	6; 3
3	(Japan) (South Korea)	Shigeyuki Nishio / Toru Yonezawa; Jeon Young-dai / Song Dong-wook	7; 5	5; 7	6; 3	3; 6	7; 5
4	(Japan) (South Korea)	Tsuyoshi Fukui; Lee Woo-ryong	6; 1	6; 1
5	(Japan) (South Korea)	Hitoshi Shirato; Song Dong-wook	5; 7	5; 7

== Final ==
=== Japan vs. India ===
Japan
2
Den-En Colosseum, Tokyo, Japan
30 September–2 October 1983
Hard

India
3

			1	2	3	4	5
1	(Japan) (India)	Tsuyoshi Fukui; Ramesh Krishnan	4; 6	1; 6	6; 3	6; 4	0; 6
2	(Japan) (India)	Hitoshi Shirato; Vijay Amritraj	2; 6	6; 8	3; 6
3	(Japan) (India)	Jun Kamiwazumi / Toru Yonezawa; Anand Amritraj / Vijay Amritraj	1; 6	8; 6	4; 6	2; 6
4	(Japan) (India)	Hitoshi Shirato; Ramesh Krishnan	2; 6	6; 4	7; 5
5	(Japan) (India)	Tsuyoshi Fukui; Vijay Amritraj	7; 5	6; 3
