= 1987 Davis Cup Eastern Zone =

International tennis competition

The Eastern Zone was one of the three regional zones of the 1987 Davis Cup.

13 teams entered the Eastern Zone in total, with the winner promoted to the following year's World Group. South Korea defeated Japan in the final and qualified for the 1987 World Group.

== Participating nations ==
- Bangladesh
- China
- Chinese Taipei
- Hong Kong
- Indonesia
- Japan
- Malaysia
- New Zealand
- Pakistan
- Philippines
- Singapore
- Sri Lanka
- Thailand

=== Draw ===
First round 13–15 March
New Zealand
bye
Taipei, Taiwan (hard)
Singapore	0
Chinese Taipei	5
Thailand
bye
Dhaka, Bangladesh (hard)
Bangladesh	0
Pakistan	5
Colombo, Sri Lanka (clay)
Sri Lanka	0
Philippines	5
Kunming, China (indoor clay)
Indonesia	1
China	4
Causeway Bay, Hong Kong (hard)
Hong Kong	5
Malaysia	0
bye
Japan

Quarterfinals; 8–10 May
Taipei, Taiwan (hard)
New Zealand	5
Chinese Taipei	0
Bangkok, Thailand (hard)
Thailand	3
Pakistan	2
Wuhan, China (clay)
Philippines	1
China	4
Toyama, Japan (indoor carpet)
Hong Kong	1
Japan	4

Semifinals; 24–26 July
Bangkok, Thailand (hard)
New Zealand	4
Thailand	1
Tianjin, China (indoor carpet)
China	3
Japan	2

Final; 2–4 October
Shanghai, China (clay)
New Zealand	4
China	1

== First round ==
=== Chinese Taipei vs. Singapore ===
Chinese Taipei
5
Taipei, Taiwan
13–15 March 1987
Hard

Singapore
0

			1	2	3	4	5
1	(Chinese Taipei) (Singapore)	Liu Chung-hsing; Mahader Hassan	6; 1	6; 2	6; 3
2	(Chinese Taipei) (Singapore)	Wu Chang-rung; Peng Tan-ah	6; 1	6; 2	6; 2
3	(Chinese Taipei) (Singapore)	Hsu Huang-jung / Wu Chang-rung; Abdul Karim / Peng Tan-ah	6; 0	6; 1	6; 0
4	(Chinese Taipei) (Singapore)	Wu Chang-rung; Mahader Hassan	6; 3	7; 5
5	(Chinese Taipei) (Singapore)	Liu Chung-hsing; Peng Tan-ah	6; 2	6; 2

=== Bangladesh vs. Pakistan ===
Bangladesh
0
Dhaka, Bangladesh
13–15 March 1987
Hard

Pakistan
5

			1	2	3	4	5
1	(Bangladesh) (Pakistan)	Ifthekar Sardar; Rashid Malik	1; 6	5; 7	4; 6
2	(Bangladesh) (Pakistan)	Shovon Jamaly; Haseeb Aslam	12; 14	2; 6	9; 11
3	(Bangladesh) (Pakistan)	Ifthekar Sardar / Mahtabur Rahman; Rashid Malik / Mushaf Zia	6; 8	1; 6	2; 6
4	(Bangladesh) (Pakistan)	Ifthekar Sardar; Haseeb Aslam	3; 6	4; 6
5	(Bangladesh) (Pakistan)	Mahtabur Rahman; Mushaf Zia	6; 4	2; 6	0; 6

=== Sri Lanka vs. Philippines ===
Sri Lanka
0
Sri Lanka Tennis Association, Colombo, Sri Lanka
13–15 March 1987
Clay

Philippines
5

			1	2	3	4	5
1	(Sri Lanka) (Philippines)	Arjun Fernando; Rodrigo Rafael	6; 3	6; 4	4; 6	4; 6	2; 6
2	(Sri Lanka) (Philippines)	Frank Sebaratnam; Manny Tolentino	0; 6	0; 6	2; 6
3	(Sri Lanka) (Philippines)	Arjun Fernando / Frank Sebaratnam; Andres Battad / Raymundo Suarez	2; 6	0; 6	6; 8
4	(Sri Lanka) (Philippines)	Neil Rajapakse; Andres Battad	2; 6	2; 6
5	(Sri Lanka) (Philippines)	Arjun Fernando; Manny Tolentino	6; 8	6; 4	3; 6

=== China vs. Indonesia ===
China
4
Kunming, China
13–15 March 1987
Clay (indoors)

Indonesia
1

			1	2	3	4	5
1	(China) (Indonesia)	Liu Shuhua; Tintus Arianto Wibowo	6; 3	9; 7	8; 6
2	(China) (Indonesia)	Ma Keqin; Yustedjo Tarik	4; 6	3; 6	2; 6
3	(China) (Indonesia)	Liu Shuhua / Ma Keqin; Tintus Arianto Wibowo / Yustedjo Tarik	6; 3	6; 2	5; 7	6; 8	6; 1
4	(China) (Indonesia)	Ma Keqin; Tintus Arianto Wibowo	6; 4	9; 7	5; 7	7; 5
5	(China) (Indonesia)	Liu Shuhua; Yustedjo Tarik	6; 2	6; 1

=== Hong Kong vs. Malaysia ===
Hong Kong
5
Causeway Bay, Hong Kong
13–15 March 1987
Hard

Malaysia
0

			1	2	3	4	5
1	(Hong Kong) (Malaysia)	Mark Bailey; Yeo Kian-wah	6; 3	6; 1	6; 3
2	(Hong Kong) (Malaysia)	Colin Grant; Khairuddin Baharom	6; 1	6; 2	6; 1
3	(Hong Kong) (Malaysia)	Mark Bailey / Pang Lui; Chow Chin-chuan / Yeo Kian-wah	6; 4	6; 4	7; 5
4	(Hong Kong) (Malaysia)	Mark Bailey; Khairuddin Baharom	6; 1	6; 2	6; 2
5	(Hong Kong) (Malaysia)	Colin Grant; Yeo Kian-wah	6; 2	6; 1	6; 2

== Quarterfinals ==
=== Chinese Taipei vs. New Zealand ===
Chinese Taipei
0
Taipei, Taiwan
8–10 May 1987
Hard

New Zealand
5

			1	2	3	4	5
1	(Chinese Taipei) (New Zealand)	Liu Chung-hsing; Bruce Derlin	2; 6	1; 6	1; 6
2	(Chinese Taipei) (New Zealand)	Wu Chang-rung; Kelly Evernden	4; 6	2; 6	1; 6
3	(Chinese Taipei) (New Zealand)	Hsu Huang-jung / Wu Chang-rung; Kelly Evernden / Steve Guy	3; 6	2; 6	4; 6
4	(Chinese Taipei) (New Zealand)	Wu Chang-rung; Bruce Derlin	3; 6	10; 12
5	(Chinese Taipei) (New Zealand)	Liu Chung-hsing; Kelly Evernden	3; 6	2; 6

=== Thailand vs. Pakistan ===
Thailand
3
Bangkok, Thailand
8–10 May 1987
Hard

Pakistan
2

			1	2	3	4	5
1	(Thailand) (Pakistan)	Tanakorn Srichaphan; Mushaf Zia	6; 3	6; 4	6; 4
2	(Thailand) (Pakistan)	Woraphol Thongkhamchu; Haseeb Aslam	9; 11	1; 6	2; 6
3	(Thailand) (Pakistan)	Vittaya Samrej / Tanakorn Srichaphan; Haseeb Aslam / Hamed-ul-Haq	6; 8	6; 3	6; 4	7; 5
4	(Thailand) (Pakistan)	Woraphol Thongkhamchu; Rashid Malik	6; 2	6; 8	3; 6	11; 9	6; 2
5	(Thailand) (Pakistan)	Tanakorn Srichaphan; Haseeb Aslam	5; 7	2; 6

=== China vs. Philippines ===
China
4
Wuhan, China
8–10 May 1987
Clay

Philippines
1

			1	2	3	4	5
1	(China) (Philippines)	Ma Keqin; Manny Tolentino	7; 5	6; 3	6; 4
2	(China) (Philippines)	Liu Shuhua; Andres Battad	10; 8	6; 0	6; 2
3	(China) (Philippines)	Liu Shuhua / Ma Keqin; Rodrigo Rafael / Raymundo Suarez	6; 4	6; 2	6; 4
4	(China) (Philippines)	Ma Keqin; Andres Battad	6; 3	6; 3
5	(China) (Philippines)	You Wei; Manny Tolentino	5; 7	6; 4	1; 6

=== Japan vs. Hong Kong ===
Japan
4
Toyama, Japan
8–10 May 1987
Carpet (indoors)

Hong Kong
1

			1	2	3	4	5
1	(Japan) (Hong Kong)	Shozo Shiraishi; Mark Bailey	8; 10	6; 3	6; 1	6; 2
2	(Japan) (Hong Kong)	Tsuyoshi Fukui; Colin Grant	6; 2	6; 2	6; 3
3	(Japan) (Hong Kong)	Kiyotaka Tachibana / Masayoshi Takeyari; Mark Bailey / Colin Grant	4; 6	4; 6	4; 6
4	(Japan) (Hong Kong)	Tsuyoshi Fukui; Mark Bailey	6; 2	6; 3	6; 2
5	(Japan) (Hong Kong)	Shozo Shiraishi; Colin Grant	6; 4	6; 4

== Semifinals ==
=== Thailand vs. New Zealand ===
Thailand
1
Bangkok, Thailand
24–26 July 1987
Hard

New Zealand
4

			1	2	3	4	5
1	(Thailand) (New Zealand)	Panomkorn Pladchurnil; Kelly Evernden	2; 6	6; 8	2; 6
2	(Thailand) (New Zealand)	Woraphol Thongkhamchu; Bruce Derlin	6; 2	2; 6	1; 6	4; 6
3	(Thailand) (New Zealand)	Vittaya Samrej / Tanakorn Srichaphan; Kelly Evernden / Steve Guy	7; 9	1; 6	5; 7
4	(Thailand) (New Zealand)	Panomkorn Pladchurnil; Bruce Derlin	7; 5	3; 6	3; 6
5	(Thailand) (New Zealand)	Woraphol Thongkhamchu; Kelly Evernden	6; 0	6; 2

=== China vs. Japan ===
China
3
Tianjin, China
24–26 July 1987
Carpet (indoors)

Japan
2

			1	2	3	4	5
1	(China) (Japan)	Liu Shuhua; Shuzo Matsuoka	4; 6	6; 1	4; 6	7; 5	8; 6
2	(China) (Japan)	Ma Keqin; Tsuyoshi Fukui	4; 6	4; 6	4; 6
3	(China) (Japan)	Liu Shuhua / Ma Keqin; Eiji Takeuchi / Masayoshi Takeyari	6; 4	6; 4	6; 3
4	(China) (Japan)	Ma Keqin; Shuzo Matsuoka	7; 9	6; 8	2; 6
5	(China) (Japan)	Liu Shuhua; Tsuyoshi Fukui	6; 1	6; 4	1; 6	6; 3

== Final ==
=== China vs. New Zealand ===
China
1
Shanghai, China
2–4 October 1987
Clay

New Zealand
4

			1	2	3	4	5
1	(China) (New Zealand)	Liu Shuhua; Bruce Derlin	4; 6	4; 6	1; 6
2	(China) (New Zealand)	You Wei; Kelly Evernden	2; 6	7; 9	3; 6
3	(China) (New Zealand)	Liu Shuhua / Ma Keqin; Bruce Derlin / Kelly Evernden	7; 5	4; 6	5; 7	6; 8
4	(China) (New Zealand)	Liu Shuhua; Kelly Evernden	2; 6	4; 6
5	(China) (New Zealand)	You Wei; Bruce Derlin	10; 8	6; 8	6; 4
