= 1982 Davis Cup Eastern Zone =

International tennis competition

The Eastern Zone was one of the three regional zones of the 1982 Davis Cup.

10 teams entered the Eastern Zone in total, with the winner promoted to the following year's World Group. Indonesia defeated Japan in the final and qualified for the 1983 World Group.

== Participating nations ==
- Chinese Taipei
- Hong Kong
- Indonesia
- Japan
- Malaysia
- Pakistan
- Philippines
- South Korea
- Sri Lanka
- Thailand

=== Draw ===
First round 8–10 January
Malaysia
bye
bye
Indonesia
South Korea
bye
Causeway Bay, Hong Kong (hard)
Hong Kong	2
Philippines	3
Chinese Taipei	w/o
Pakistan
bye
Japan
Sri Lanka
bye
bye
Thailand

Quarterfinals; 22–24 January
Kuala Lumpur, Malaysia (indoor carpet)
Malaysia	1
Indonesia	4
Manila, Philippines (indoor clay)
South Korea	4
Philippines	1
Taipei, Taiwan (indoor hard)
Chinese Taipei	1
Japan	4
Colombo, Sri Lanka (clay)
Sri Lanka	1
Thailand	3

Semifinals; 5–7 March
Jakarta, Indonesia (clay)
Indonesia	3
South Korea	2
Tokyo, Japan (clay)
Japan	5
Thailand	0

Final; 7–9 May
Jakarta, Indonesia (clay)
Indonesia	4
Japan	1

== First round ==
=== Hong Kong vs. Philippines ===
Hong Kong
2
Victoria Park, Causeway Bay, Hong Kong
8–10 January 1982
Hard

Philippines
3

			1	2	3	4	5
1	(Hong Kong) (Philippines)	Pang Chi-yuen; Ody Gabriel	2; 6	6; 2	6; 3	1; 6	2; 6
2	(Hong Kong) (Philippines)	Kelvin Ng; Manuel Valleramos	6; 1	7; 5	6; 3
3	(Hong Kong) (Philippines)	Mark Bailey / Kelvin Ng; Ody Gabriel / Alexander Marcial	6; 8	2; 6	4; 6
4	(Hong Kong) (Philippines)	Kelvin Ng; Ody Gabriel	6; 4	6; 3	6; 4
5	(Hong Kong) (Philippines)	Pang Chi-yuen; Manuel Valleramos	1; 6	0; 6	0; 6

== Quarterfinals ==
=== Malaysia vs. Indonesia ===
Malaysia
1
Stadium Negara, Kuala Lumpur, Malaysia
22–24 January 1982
Carpet (indoors)

Indonesia
4

			1	2	3	4	5
1	(Malaysia) (Indonesia)	Selvarajoo Selvarajoo; Tintus Arianto Wibowo	8; 6	6; 8	2; 6	2; 6
2	(Malaysia) (Indonesia)	Rudy Foo; Yustedjo Tarik	4; 6	7; 5	7; 5	4; 6	6; 0
3	(Malaysia) (Indonesia)	Rudy Foo / Adam Malik; Tintus Arianto Wibowo / Yustedjo Tarik	2; 6	3; 6	2; 6
4	(Malaysia) (Indonesia)	Selvarajoo Selvarajoo; Yustedjo Tarik	2; 6	2; 6	3; 6
5	(Malaysia) (Indonesia)	Rudy Foo; Tintus Arianto Wibowo	6; 3	6; 8	1; 6	3; 6

=== Philippines vs. South Korea ===
Philippines
1
Manila, Philippines
22–24 January 1982
Clay (indoors)

South Korea
4

			1	2	3	4	5
1	(Philippines) (South Korea)	Manuel Valleramos; Jeon Young-dai	3; 6	6; 2	3; 6	3; 6
2	(Philippines) (South Korea)	Rolando Zalameda; Kim Choon-ho	10; 12	6; 4	3; 6	1; 6
3	(Philippines) (South Korea)	Ody Gabriel / Alexander Marcial; Jeon Young-dai / Song Dong-wook	3; 6	6; 4	6; 4	6; 2
4	(Philippines) (South Korea)	Alexander Marcial; Jeon Young-dai	6; 8	2; 6	3; 6
5	(Philippines) (South Korea)	Manuel Valleramos; Kim Choon-ho	4; 6	5; 7

=== Chinese Taipei vs. Japan ===
Chinese Taipei
1
Taipei, Taiwan
February 1982
Hard (indoors)

Japan
4

			1	2	3	4	5
1	(Chinese Taipei) (Japan)	Wu Chang-rung; Shinichi Sakamoto	4; 6	3; 6	7; 5	5; 7
2	(Chinese Taipei) (Japan)	Hsu Huang-jung; Shigeyuki Nishio	6; 4	6; 3	1; 6	2; 6	1; 6
3	(Chinese Taipei) (Japan)	Hsu Huang-jung / Wu Chang-rung; Hitoshi Shirato / Toru Yonezawa	2; 6	2; 6	12; 14
4	(Chinese Taipei) (Japan)	Hsu Huang-jung; Shinichi Sakamoto	6; 4	2; 6	5; 7
5	(Chinese Taipei) (Japan)	Wu Chang-rung; Shigeyuki Nishio	6; 2	6; 2

=== Sri Lanka vs. Thailand ===
Sri Lanka
1
Sri Lanka Tennis Association, Colombo, Sri Lanka
22–24 January 1982
Clay

Thailand
3

			1	2	3	4	5
1	(Sri Lanka) (Thailand)	Arjun Perera; Panomkorn Pladchurnil	2; 6	1; 6	2; 6
2	(Sri Lanka) (Thailand)	Arjun Fernando; Sombat Uamongkol	6; 4	5; 7	6; 4	3; 6	6; 1
3	(Sri Lanka) (Thailand)	Everard de Silva / Arjun Fernando; Panomkorn Pladchurnil / Sombat Uamongkol	4; 6	6; 4	3; 6	3; 6
4	(Sri Lanka) (Thailand)	Arjun Fernando; Panomkorn Pladchurnil	1; 6	7; 5	6; 4	4; 6	2; 6
5	(Sri Lanka) (Thailand)	Arjun Perera; Sombat Uamongkol						not played

== Semifinals ==
=== Indonesia vs. South Korea ===
Indonesia
3
Jakarta, Indonesia
5–7 March 1972
Clay

South Korea
2

			1	2	3	4	5
1	(Indonesia) (South Korea)	Tintus Arianto Wibowo; Jeon Young-dai	4; 6	2; 6	2; 6
2	(Indonesia) (South Korea)	Yustedjo Tarik; Kim Choon-ho	4; 6	2; 6	6; 4	6; 1	6; 2
3	(Indonesia) (South Korea)	Tintus Arianto Wibowo / Atet Wijono; Jeon Young-dai / Song Dong-wook	3; 6	3; 6	2; 6
4	(Indonesia) (South Korea)	Yustedjo Tarik; Jeon Young-dai	9; 7	6; 0	9; 7
5	(Indonesia) (South Korea)	Tintus Arianto Wibowo; Kim Choon-ho	6; 3	3; 6	6; 4	6; 1

=== Japan vs. Thailand ===
Japan
5
Den-En Colosseum, Tokyo, Japan
5–7 March 1972
Clay

Thailand
0

			1	2	3	4	5
1	(Japan) (Thailand)	Tsuyoshi Fukui; Sombat Uamongkol	6; 0	6; 3	5; 7	6; 0
2	(Japan) (Thailand)	Shigeyuki Nishio; Panomkorn Pladchurnil	6; 2	6; 8	6; 0	7; 5
3	(Japan) (Thailand)	Tsuyoshi Fukui / Toru Yonezawa; Panomkorn Pladchurnil / Sombat Uamongkol	6; 1	6; 2	6; 3
4	(Japan) (Thailand)	Tsuyoshi Fukui; Panomkorn Pladchurnil	6; 3	6; 2
5	(Japan) (Thailand)	Shigeyuki Nishio; Sombat Uamongkol	6; 3	6; 4

== Final ==
=== Indonesia vs. Japan ===
Indonesia
4
Jakarta, Indonesia
7–9 May 1982
Clay

Japan
1

			1	2	3	4	5
1	(Indonesia) (Japan)	Yustedjo Tarik; Tsuyoshi Fukui	6; 4	9; 7	1; 6	7; 5
2	(Indonesia) (Japan)	Tintus Arianto Wibowo; Shigeyuki Nishio	6; 3	6; 3	9; 7
3	(Indonesia) (Japan)	Hadiman / Yustedjo Tarik; Tsuyoshi Fukui / Toru Yonezawa	6; 2	6; 3	6; 3
4	(Indonesia) (Japan)	Tintus Arianto Wibowo; Eiji Takeuchi	6; 4	3; 6	6; 4
5	(Indonesia) (Japan)	Hadiman; Toru Yonezawa	3; 6	5; 7
