= 1988 Davis Cup Asia/Oceania Zone =

International tennis competition

The Asia/Oceania Zone was one of the three zones of the regional Davis Cup competition in 1988.

In the Asia/Oceania Zone there were two different tiers, called groups, in which teams competed against each other to advance to the upper tier.

== Group I ==
The winner of Group I was promoted to the following year's World Group. Teams who lost their respective first-round ties competed in the relegation play-off, with the winning team remaining in Group I, whereas the losing team was relegated to the Asia/Oceania Zone Group II in 1989.

=== Participating nations ===
- China
- Indonesia
- Japan
- Philippines
- South Korea
- Thailand

==== Draw ====
First Round; 5–7 February
South Korea
bye
Manila, Philippines (indoor clay)
Japan	2
Philippines	3
Jakarta, Indonesia (clay)
Thailand	0
Indonesia	5
bye
China

Second Round; 8–10 April
Seoul, South Korea (clay)
South Korea	5
Philippines	0
Jakarta, Indonesia (clay)
Indonesia	4
China	1

Third Round; 22–24 July
Jakarta, Indonesia (clay)
South Korea	2
Indonesia	3

- Indonesia are promoted to the World Group in 1989.

Relegation Play-off; 8–10 April
Bangkok, Thailand (hard)
Japan	4
Thailand	1

- Thailand are relegated to Group II in 1989.

=== First round ===
==== Philippines vs. Japan ====
Philippines
3
Manila, Philippines
5–7 February 1988
Clay (indoors)

Japan
2

			1	2	3	4	5
1	(Philippines) (Japan)	Andres Battad; Toshihisa Tsuchihashi	6; 3	3; 6	3; 6	2; 6
2	(Philippines) (Japan)	Anthony Navarrosa; Shigeru Ota	1; 6	4; 6	4; 6
3	(Philippines) (Japan)	Rodrigo Rafael / Raymundo Suarez; Hitoshi Shiratoa / Eiji Takeuchi	9; 11	6; 4	6; 4	6; 4
4	(Philippines) (Japan)	Andres Battad; Shigeru Ota	6; 4	2; 6	6; 3	6; 4
5	(Philippines) (Japan)	Raymundo Suarez; Toshihisa Tsuchihashi	3; 6	6; 3	6; 4	3; 6	6; 3

==== Indonesia vs. Thailand ====
Indonesia
5
Jakarta, Indonesia
5–7 February 1988
Clay

Thailand
0

			1	2	3	4	5
1	(Indonesia) (Thailand)	Tintus Arianto Wibowo; Woraphol Thongkhamchu	6; 3	5; 7	6; 3	7; 5
2	(Indonesia) (Thailand)	Hary Suharyadi; Tanakorn Srichaphan	6; 2	6; 1	3; 6	6; 4
3	(Indonesia) (Thailand)	Hary Suharyadi / Donald Wailan-Walalangi; Tanakorn Srichaphan / Woraphol Thongkhamchu	6; 3	6; 2	6; 1
4	(Indonesia) (Thailand)	Tintus Arianto Wibowo; Tanakorn Srichaphan	9; 7	6; 1
5	(Indonesia) (Thailand)	Hary Suharyadi; Woraphol Thongkhamchu	6; 3	6; 4

=== Second round ===
==== South Korea vs. Philippines ====
South Korea
5
Seoul, South Korea
8–10 April 1988
Clay

Philippines
0

			1	2	3	4	5
1	(South Korea) (Philippines)	Kim Bong-soo; Andres Battad	6; 2	6; 1	6; 0
2	(South Korea) (Philippines)	Roh Gap-taik; Raymundo Suarez	6; 2	6; 3	6; 3
3	(South Korea) (Philippines)	Song Dong-wook / Yoo Jin-sun; Rodrigo Rafael / Raymundo Suarez	6; 3	6; 3	6; 3
4	(South Korea) (Philippines)	Roh Gap-taik; Andres Battad	6; 3	6; 3
5	(South Korea) (Philippines)	Kim Bong-soo; Raymundo Suarez	6; 1	6; 3

==== Indonesia vs. China ====
Indonesia
4
Jakarta, Indonesia
8–10 April 1988
Clay

China
1

			1	2	3	4	5
1	(Indonesia) (China)	Hary Suharyadi; Ma Keqin	8; 6	6; 1	6; 3
2	(Indonesia) (China)	Tintus Arianto Wibowo; You Wei	4; 6	4; 6	6; 2	6; 3	4; 6
3	(Indonesia) (China)	Hary Suharyadi / Donald Wailan-Walalangi; Liu Shuhua / Ma Keqin	7; 5	6; 3	6; 3
4	(Indonesia) (China)	Hary Suharyadi; You Wei	6; 4	6; 2	6; 2
5	(Indonesia) (China)	Tintus Arianto Wibowo; Ma Keqin	6; 3	6; 3

=== Relegation play-off ===
==== Thailand vs. Japan ====
Thailand
1
Bangkok, Thailand
8–10 April 1988
Hard

Japan
4

			1	2	3	4	5
1	(Thailand) (Japan)	Panomkorn Pladchurnil; Shuzo Matsuoka	1; 6	2; 6	2; 6
2	(Thailand) (Japan)	Woraphol Thongkhamchu; Toshihisa Tsuchihashi	6; 1	1; 6	4; 6	7; 5	1; 6
3	(Thailand) (Japan)	Vittaya Samrej / Woraphol Thongkhamchu; Kenichi Kiyomiya / Shigeru Ota	6; 3	1; 6	6; 1	6; 4
4	(Thailand) (Japan)	Panomkorn Pladchurnil; Toshihisa Tsuchihashi	6; 4	5; 7	4; 6	1; 6
5	(Thailand) (Japan)	Woraphol Thongkhamchu; Shuzo Matsuoka	5; 7	0; 6

=== Third round ===
==== Indonesia vs. South Korea ====
Indonesia
3
Jakarta, Indonesia
22–24 July 1988
Clay

South Korea
2

			1	2	3	4	5
1	(Indonesia) (South Korea)	Hary Suharyadi; Kim Bong-soo	1; 6	5; 7	1; 6
2	(Indonesia) (South Korea)	Tintus Arianto Wibowo; Yoo Jin-sun	3; 6	4; 6	4; 6
3	(Indonesia) (South Korea)	Hary Suharyadi / Donald Wailan-Walalangi; Bae Nam-ju / Yoo Jin-sun	6; 3	6; 3	11; 13	11; 9
4	(Indonesia) (South Korea)	Hary Suharyadi; Song Dong-wook	6; 2	6; 2	1; 6	4; 6	6; 4
5	(Indonesia) (South Korea)	Tintus Arianto Wibowo; Kim Bong-soo	3; 6	6; 3	6; 2	6; 4

== Group II ==
The winner in Group II advanced to the Asia/Oceania Zone Group I in 1989.

=== Participating nations ===
- Bangladesh
- Chinese Taipei
- Hong Kong
- Iraq
- Malaysia
- Pakistan
- Saudi Arabia
- Singapore
- Sri Lanka
- Syria

==== Draw ====
First Round; 5–7 February
Hong Kong
bye
bye
Iraq
Singapore
bye
Saudi Arabia
Syria	w/o
Bangladesh
bye
bye
Chinese Taipei
Kuala Lumpur, Malaysia (indoor hard)
Sri Lanka	4
Malaysia	1
bye
Pakistan

Second Round; 8–11 April
Causeway Bay, Hong Kong (hard)
Hong Kong	5
Iraq	0
Damascus, Syria (indoor hard)
Singapore	4
Syria	1
Taipei, Taiwan (indoor hard)
Bangladesh	1
Chinese Taipei	4
Colombo, Sri Lanka (clay)
Sri Lanka	2
Pakistan	3

Third Round; 6–8 May
Hong Kong (indoor carpet)
Hong Kong	5
Singapore	0
Taipei, Taiwan (indoor carpet)
Chinese Taipei	1
Pakistan	4

Third Round; 22–24 July
Causeway Bay, Hong Kong (hard)
Hong Kong	5
Pakistan	0

- Hong Kong are promoted to Group I in 1989.

=== First round ===
==== Sri Lanka vs. Malaysia ====
Malaysia
1
Kuala Lumpur, Malaysia
5–7 February 1988
Hard (indoors)

Sri Lanka
4

			1	2	3	4	5
1	(Malaysia) (Sri Lanka)	Selvam Veerasingam; Arjun Fernando	4; 6	2; 6	3; 6
2	(Malaysia) (Sri Lanka)	Chow Chin-chuan; Umesha Wallooppillai	11; 9	6; 1	2; 6	1; 6	1; 3	retired
3	(Malaysia) (Sri Lanka)	Chow Chin-chuan / Selvam Veerasingam; Arjun Fernando / Sujit Fernando	7; 5	9; 7				retired
4	(Malaysia) (Sri Lanka)	Chow Chin-chuan; Arjun Fernando	6; 4	2; 6	2; 6	6; 1	3; 6
5	(Malaysia) (Sri Lanka)	Selvam Veerasingam; Umesha Wallooppillai	6^{5} 7^{7}	2; 6

=== Second round ===
==== Hong Kong vs. Iraq ====
Hong Kong
5
Causeway Bay, Hong Kong
8–10 April 1988
Hard

Iraq
0

			1	2	3	4	5
1	(Hong Kong) (Iraq)	Mark Bailey; Ali Al Zubaidi	6; 3	6; 0	6; 1
2	(Hong Kong) (Iraq)	Colin Grant; Youssef Hassan	6; 1	6; 3	6; 2
3	(Hong Kong) (Iraq)	Mark Bailey / Pang Lui; Ali Al Zubaidi / Youssef Hassan	6; 2	6; 4	6; 2
4	(Hong Kong) (Iraq)	Mark Bailey; Youssef Hassan	6; 2	6; 0
5	(Hong Kong) (Iraq)	Colin Grant; Ali Al Zubaidi	6; 2	6; 1

==== Syria vs. Singapore ====
Syria
1
Damascus, Syria
8–10 April 1988
Hard (indoors)

Singapore
4

			1	2	3	4	5
1	(Syria) (Singapore)	Mounged Bouhassoun; Liu Wai-yaw	7; 5	4; 6	1; 6	1; 6
2	(Syria) (Singapore)	Dawood Dawoodian; Hashim Bin Sidek	5; 7	6; 2	6; 4	2; 6	5; 7
3	(Syria) (Singapore)	Abdul-Latif Mourad / Samer Mourad; Hassan Bin Bohari / Albert Teo	4; 6	3; 6	14; 16
4	(Syria) (Singapore)	Mounged Bouhassoun; Hashim Bin Sidek	0; 6	3; 6
5	(Syria) (Singapore)	Dawood Dawoodian; Liu Wai-yaw	6; 3	10; 8

==== Chinese Taipei vs. Bangladesh ====
Chinese Taipei
4
Taipei, Taiwan
8–10 April 1988
Hard (indoors)

Bangladesh
1

			1	2	3	4	5
1	(Chinese Taipei) (Bangladesh)	Hsu Huang-jung; Ifthekar Sardar	7; 5	4; 6	6; 4	7; 5
2	(Chinese Taipei) (Bangladesh)	Wu Chang-rung; Shovon Jamaly	6; 2	6; 4	6; 1
3	(Chinese Taipei) (Bangladesh)	Chen Tze-shin / Liu Chung-hsing; Ifthekar Sardar / Shovon Jamaly	6; 4	6; 4	6; 2
4	(Chinese Taipei) (Bangladesh)	Wu Chang-rung; Ifthekar Sardar	6; 4	9; 7
5	(Chinese Taipei) (Bangladesh)	Hsu Huang-jung; Shovon Jamaly	3; 6	6; 3	3; 6

==== Sri Lanka vs. Pakistan ====
Sri Lanka
2
Sri Lanka Tennis Association, Colombo, Sri Lanka
8–11 April 1988
Clay

Pakistan
3

			1	2	3	4	5
1	(Sri Lanka) (Pakistan)	Arjun Fernando; Haseeb Aslam	8; 6	6; 4	6; 4
2	(Sri Lanka) (Pakistan)	Umesha Wallooppillai; Mushaf Zia	4; 6	6; 2	3; 6	6; 3	2; 6
3	(Sri Lanka) (Pakistan)	Arjun Fernando / Sujit Fernando; Haseeb Aslam / Rashid Malik	6; 4	3; 6	4; 6	6; 4	6; 4
4	(Sri Lanka) (Pakistan)	Umesha Wallooppillai; Haseeb Aslam	3; 6	2; 6	1; 6
5	(Sri Lanka) (Pakistan)	Arjun Fernando; Mushaf Zia	3; 6	4; 6	5; 7

=== Third round ===
==== Hong Kong vs. Singapore ====
Hong Kong
5
Hong Kong
6–8 May 1988
Carpet (indoors)

Singapore
0

			1	2	3	4	5
1	(Hong Kong) (Singapore)	Mark Bailey; Liu Wai-yaw	6; 1	6; 0	6; 2
2	(Hong Kong) (Singapore)	Colin Grant; Melvin Pereira	6; 1	6; 0	6; 2
3	(Hong Kong) (Singapore)	Mark Bailey / Andy Brothers; Liu Wai-yaw / Melvin Pereira	6; 2	6; 0	6; 1
4	(Hong Kong) (Singapore)	Mark Bailey; Melvin Pereira	6; 2	6; 0
5	(Hong Kong) (Singapore)	Colin Grant; Liu Wai-yaw	6; 1	8; 6

==== Chinese Taipei vs. Pakistan ====
Chinese Taipei
1
Taipei, Taiwan
6–8 May 1988
Carpet (indoors)

Pakistan
4

			1	2	3	4	5
1	(Chinese Taipei) (Pakistan)	Hsu Huang-jung; Mushaf Zia	5; 7	5; 7	4; 6
2	(Chinese Taipei) (Pakistan)	Wu Chang-rung; Haseeb Aslam	3; 6	3; 6	4; 6
3	(Chinese Taipei) (Pakistan)	Lien Yu-hui / Wu Chang-rung; Rashid Malik / Hamed-ul-Haq	6; 4	4; 6	3; 6	10; 8	6; 4
4	(Chinese Taipei) (Pakistan)	Wu Chang-rung; Mushaf Zia	4; 6	11; 13	2; 6
5	(Chinese Taipei) (Pakistan)	Hsu Huang-jung; Haseeb Aslam	2; 6	4; 6

=== Fourth round ===
==== Hong Kong vs. Pakistan ====
Hong Kong
5
Causeway Bay, Hong Kong
22–24 July 1988
Hard

Pakistan
0

			1	2	3	4	5
1	(Hong Kong) (Pakistan)	Colin Grant; Mushaf Zia	6; 1	6; 1	6; 3
2	(Hong Kong) (Pakistan)	Mark Bailey; Hamed-ul-Haq	6; 2	6; 3	13; 11
3	(Hong Kong) (Pakistan)	Mark Bailey / Andy Brothers; Hamed-ul-Haq / Mushaf Zia	6; 3	11; 9	2; 6	6; 4
4	(Hong Kong) (Pakistan)	Colin Grant; Hamed-ul-Haq	6; 4	6; 4
5	(Hong Kong) (Pakistan)	Andy Brothers; Mushaf Zia	6; 3	6; 4
