= 1979 Japan Open Tennis Championships – Men's doubles =

Men's doubles
- 1979 Japan Open Tennis Championships

Final
- Champion: (United States) Pat DuPré; (Australia) Colin Dibley
- Runner-up: (Australia) Rod Frawley; (Paraguay) Francisco González
- Score: 3–6, 6–1, 6–1

Details
- Draw: 32
- Seeds: 8

Events
Singles	men	women
Doubles	men	women
- Japan Open

Geoff Masters and Ross Case were the defending champions, although Masters did not participate this year. Case partnered with Kim Warwick, but they lost in the quarterfinals.

Pat DuPré and Colin Dibley won the title, defeating Rod Frawley and Francisco González in the final, 3–6, 6–1, 6–1.

== Seeds ==
1. (Australia) Mark Edmondson / (Australia) John Marks (semifinals)
2. (United Kingdom) Buster Mottram / (United States) Sherwood Stewart (quarterfinals)
3. (Australia) Ross Case / (Australia) Kim Warwick (quarterfinals)
4. (Australia) Paul Kronk / (Australia) Peter McNamara (semifinals)
5. (United States) John Sadri / (United States) Tim Wilkison (second round)
6. (United States) Victor Amaya / (South Africa) Cliff Drysdale (quarterfinals)
7. (United States) Pat DuPré / (Australia) Colin Dibley (champions)
8. (Australia) Rod Frawley / (Paraguay) Francisco González (final)

== Draw ==
Key

- Q = Qualifier
- WC = Wild card
- LL = Lucky loser
- Alt = Alternate
- ITF = ITF entry
- PR = Protected ranking
- SR = Special ranking
- SE = Special exempt
- JE = Junior exempt
- JR = Junior Accelerator Programme entrant
- CO = College Accelerator Programme entrant
- NG = Next Gen Accelerator Program entrant
- w/o = Walkover
- r = Retired
- d = Defaulted

=== Finals ===
Semifinals
1	(Australia) Mark Edmondson (Australia) John Marks	6	6	1
7	(United States) Pat DuPré (Australia) Colin Dibley	7	2	6
4	(Australia) Paul Kronk (Australia) Peter McNamara	4	1
8	(Australia) Rod Frawley (Paraguay) Francisco González	6	6

Final
7	(United States) Pat DuPré (Australia) Colin Dibley	3	6	6
8	(Australia) Rod Frawley (Paraguay) Francisco González	6	1	1

=== Top half ===
First round
1	(Australia) M Edmondson (Australia) J Marks	6	6
(India) S Menon (South Africa) B Mitton	0	2
(Japan) A Kawaguchi (Japan) A Naguro	3	3
(United States) J Bailey (United States) T Graham	6	6
(Japan) S Nishio (Japan) S Sakamoto	w/o
(Argentina) J Clerc (Argentina) C Gattiker
(Sweden) S Simonsson (Sweden) H Simonsson	2	3
6	(United States) V Amaya (South Africa) C Drysdale	6	6
3	(Australia) R Case (Australia) K Warwick	6	7
(Zimbabwe) H Ismail (West Germany) W Popp	1	5
(Austria) P Feigl (United States) G Hardie	6	7
(Japan) S Kato (Japan) Y Yamamoto	1	6
(China) C Ni (China) Z Xie	1	1
(Japan) S Tatsuno (Japan) T Yonezawa	6	6
(United States) M Cahill (Australia) A Gardiner	3	2
7	(United States) P DuPré (Australia) C Dibley	6	6

Second round
1	(Australia) M Edmondson (Australia) J Marks	6	6
(United States) J Bailey (United States) T Graham	4	1
(Japan) S Nishio (Japan) S Sakamoto	2	2
6	(United States) V Amaya (South Africa) C Drysdale	6	6
3	(Australia) R Case (Australia) K Warwick	6	7
(Austria) P Feigl (United States) G Hardie	1	5
(Japan) S Tatsuno (Japan) T Yonezawa	1	2
7	(United States) P DuPré (Australia) C Dibley	6	6

Quarterfinals
1	(Australia) M Edmondson (Australia) J Marks	6	1	6
6	(United States) V Amaya (South Africa) C Drysdale	2	6	3
3	(Australia) R Case (Australia) K Warwick	6	7	2
7	(United States) P DuPré (Australia) C Dibley	7	5	6

Semifinals
1	(Australia) M Edmondson (Australia) J Marks	6	6	1
7	(United States) P DuPré (Australia) C Dibley	7	2	6

=== Bottom half ===
First round
5	(United States) J Sadri (United States) T Wilkison	6	6
(Japan) T Kuramitsu (Japan) K Tanabe	2	2
(Japan) T Kanai (Japan) N Tamura	2	1
(Japan) T Fukui (Japan) J Kamiwazumi	6	6
(West Germany) T Fürst (Japan) S Shiraishi	6	5	6
(Japan) A Motomura (Japan) E Uchiyama	4	7	4
(Japan) S Ito (Japan) O Nakamura	0	2
4	(Australia) P Kronk (Australia) P McNamara	6	6
8	(Australia) R Frawley (Paraguay) F González	6	6
(Japan) A Machidori (Japan) H Shirato	3	2
(Australia) J Bartlett (India) R Krishnan	1	7	6
(Japan) S Nakamura (Japan) Y Ohnishi	6	5	3
(United States) S Denton (United States) J Turpin	4	6	6
(United States) C Delaney (United States) J Delaney	6	4	3
(West Germany) J Fassbender (United States) T Moor	3	6
2	(United Kingdom) B Mottram (United States) S Stewart	6	7

Second round
5	(United States) J Sadri (United States) T Wilkison	4	6
(Japan) T Fukui (Japan) J Kamiwazumi	6	7
(West Germany) T Fürst (Japan) S Shiraishi	1	2
4	(Australia) P Kronk (Australia) P McNamara	6	6
8	(Australia) R Frawley (Paraguay) F González	6	6
(Australia) J Bartlett (India) R Krishnan	3	4
(United States) S Denton (United States) J Turpin	2	4
2	(United Kingdom) B Mottram (United States) S Stewart	6	6

Quarterfinals
(Japan) T Fukui (Japan) J Kamiwazumi	3	3
4	(Australia) P Kronk (Australia) P McNamara	6	6
8	(Australia) R Frawley (Paraguay) F González	6	6
2	(United Kingdom) B Mottram (United States) S Stewart	3	2

Semifinals
4	(Australia) P Kronk (Australia) P McNamara	4	1
8	(Australia) R Frawley (Paraguay) F González	6	6
