= 1979 Japan Open Tennis Championships – Men's singles =

Men's singles
- 1979 Japan Open Tennis Championships

Final
- Champion: (United States) Terry Moor
- Runner-up: (United States) Pat DuPré
- Score: 3–6, 7–6, 6–2

Details
- Draw: 64 (7Q)
- Seeds: 16

Events
Singles	men	women
Doubles	men	women
- Japan Open

Adriano Panatta was the defending champion, but did not participate this year.

Terry Moor won the title, defeating Pat DuPré in the final, 3–6, 7–6, 6–2.

== Seeds ==
1. (Argentina) José Luis Clerc (first round)
2. (United States) Pat DuPré (final)
3. ~~Unknown (withdrew)~~
4. (United States) Victor Amaya (third round)
5. (United Kingdom) Buster Mottram (semifinals)
6. (Austria) Peter Feigl (third round)
7. (United States) Tim Wilkison (first round)
8. (Australia) Peter McNamara (third round)
9. (United States) Terry Moor (champion)
10. (Australia) Ross Case (third round)
11. (Australia) Rod Frawley (quarterfinals)
12. (Australia) Kim Warwick (quarterfinals)
13. (Australia) Mark Edmondson (third round)
14. (United States) John Sadri (semifinals)
15. (United States) Mike Cahill (third round)
16. (Paraguay) Francisco González (first round)

== Draw ==
Key

- Q = Qualifier
- WC = Wild card
- LL = Lucky loser
- Alt = Alternate
- ITF = ITF entry
- PR = Protected ranking
- SR = Special ranking
- SE = Special exempt
- JE = Junior exempt
- JR = Junior Accelerator Programme entrant
- CO = College Accelerator Programme entrant
- NG = Next Gen Accelerator Program entrant
- w/o = Walkover
- r = Retired
- d = Defaulted

=== Finals ===
Quarterfinals
(Japan) Jun Kamiwazumi	6	0
9	(United States) Terry Moor	7	6
14	(United States) John Sadri	7	2	6
12	(Australia) Kim Warwick	6	6	2
5	(United Kingdom) Buster Mottram	6	3	6
11	(Australia) Rod Frawley	2	6	3
(United States) Chris Delaney	4	6
2	(United States) Pat DuPré	6	7

Semifinals
9	(United States) Terry Moor	6	6
14	(United States) John Sadri	4	1
5	(United Kingdom) Buster Mottram	3	4
2	(United States) Pat DuPré	6	6

Final
9	(United States) Terry Moor	3	7	6
2	(United States) Pat DuPré	6	6	2

=== Top half ===
==== Section 1 ====
First round
1	(Argentina) J Clerc	4	1
(United States) M Grant	6	6
Q	(Japan) S Ito	2	7	2
(United States) J Bailey	6	6	6
Q	(Japan) S Tatsuno	2	3
Q	(Japan) T Kuramitsu	6	6
(Japan) J Kamiwazumi	6	6
16	(Paraguay) F González	2	0
9	(United States) T Moor	6	7
Q	(Japan) E Uchiyama	1	6
(Japan) O Nakamura	0	0
(Australia) P Kronk	6	6
(Japan) T Kanai	1	4
(Australia) J Bartlett	6	6
(Japan) A Kawaguchi	0	4
6	(Austria) P Feigl	6	6

Second round
(United States) M Grant	6	4	6
(United States) J Bailey	3	6	1
Q	(Japan) T Kuramitsu	3	2
(Japan) J Kamiwazumi	6	6
9	(United States) T Moor	w/o
(Australia) P Kronk
(Australia) J Bartlett	2	1
6	(Austria) P Feigl	6	6

Third round
(United States) M Grant	4	5
(Japan) J Kamiwazumi	6	7
9	(United States) T Moor	6	6
6	(Austria) P Feigl	3	4

Quarterfinals
(Japan) J Kamiwazumi	6	0
9	(United States) Terry Moor	7	6

==== Section 2 ====
First round
LL	(Japan) T Yonezawa	6	6
(China) Z Xie	4	4
(Japan) S Nishio	6	6
Q	(Japan) E Takeuchi	1	1
Q	(West Germany) J Fassbender	6	6
(Rhodesia) H Ismail	4	3
(United States) S Denton	3	1
14	(United States) J Sadri	6	6
12	(Australia) K Warwick	6	6
(Japan) T Fukui	4	4
(Japan) S Kato	6	2	2
Q	(Sweden) H Simonsson	3	6	6
(Japan) N Tamura	6	6
(Japan) A Motomura	2	4
(China) C Ni	3	2
8	(Australia) P McNamara	6	6

Second round
LL	(Japan) T Yonezawa	1	3
(Japan) S Nishio	6	6
Q	(West Germany) J Fassbender	1	1
14	(United States) J Sadri	6	6
12	(Australia) K Warwick	6	0	7
Q	(Sweden) H Simonsson	2	6	5
(Japan) N Tamura	2	2
8	(Australia) P McNamara	6	6

Third round
(Japan) S Nishio	6	3	1
14	(United States) J Sadri	4	6	6
12	(Australia) K Warwick	6	0	7
8	(Australia) P McNamara	2	6	5

Quarterfinals
14	(United States) J Sadri	7	2	6
12	(Australia) K Warwick	6	6	2

=== Bottom half ===
==== Section 3 ====
First round
5	(United Kingdom) B Mottram	7	6
(Australia) A Gardiner	5	2
(United States) M Turpin	6	7
(Japan) H Bamba	3	5
(United States) J Delaney	4	6	2
(United States) G Hardie	6	2	6
(Japan) S Shiraishi	4	2
15	(United States) M Cahill	6	6
11	(Australia) R Frawley	4	6	6
(India) S Menon	6	1	3
(India) R Krishnan	6	6
(Japan) T Nishiwaki	2	0
(Sweden) S Simonsson	6	6
(United States) S Stewart	1	0
(Japan) K Tanabe	0	2
4	(United States) V Amaya	6	6

Second round
5	(United Kingdom) B Mottram	6	6
(United States) M Turpin	0	1
(United States) G Hardie	6	2
15	(United States) M Cahill	7	6
11	(Australia) R Frawley	6	2	6
(India) R Krishnan	2	6	3
(Sweden) S Simonsson	3	6	3
4	(United States) V Amaya	6	3	6

Third round
5	(United Kingdom) B Mottram	6	6
15	(United States) M Cahill	2	1
11	(Australia) R Frawley	7	6
4	(United States) V Amaya	6	3

Quarterfinals
5	(United Kingdom) B Mottram	6	3	6
11	(Australia) R Frawley	2	6	3

==== Section 4 ====
First round
7	(United States) T Wilkison	5	4
(Australia) C Dibley	7	6
(United States) C Delaney	6	6	6
(Japan) S Sakamoto	7	0	4
(Japan) J Kuki	6	6
(Japan) A Naguro	2	2
(West Germany) W Popp	2	6
10	(Australia) R Case	6	7
13	(Australia) M Edmondson	6	7
(Japan) T Yamamoto	1	5
(South Africa) C Drysdale	6	7
(Australia) J Marks	3	6
(Argentina) C Gattiker	6	4
(United States) M Mitchell	7	6
(United States) T Graham	0	0
2	(United States) P DuPré	6	6

Second round
(Australia) C Dibley	6	4	2
(United States) C Delaney	2	6	6
(Japan) J Kuki	6	2	5
10	(Australia) R Case	3	6	7
13	(Australia) M Edmondson	6	6
(South Africa) C Drysdale	3	4
(United States) M Mitchell	1	1
2	(United States) P DuPré	6	6

Third round
(United States) C Delaney	6	6
10	(Australia) R Case	2	1
13	(Australia) M Edmondson	4	3
2	(United States) P DuPré	6	6

Quarterfinals
(United States) C Delaney	4	6
2	(United States) P DuPré	6	7
