= 1985 Davis Cup Eastern Zone =

International tennis competition

The Eastern Zone was one of the three regional zones of the 1985 Davis Cup.

12 teams entered the Eastern Zone in total, with the winner promoted to the following year's World Group. New Zealand defeated South Korea in the final and qualified for the 1986 World Group.

== Participating nations ==
- China
- Chinese Taipei
- Hong Kong
- Indonesia
- Malaysia
- New Zealand
- Pakistan
- Philippines
- South Korea
- Singapore
- Sri Lanka
- Thailand

=== Draw ===
First round 18–20 January
New Zealand
bye
Taipei, Taiwan (indoor hard)
Chinese Taipei	5
Sri Lanka	0
China
bye
Singapore (grass)
Hong Kong	4
Singapore	1
Kuala Lumpur, Malaysia (grass)
Philippines	5
Malaysia	0
bye
Thailand
Seoul, South Korea (indoor carpet)
South Korea	5
Indonesia	0
bye
Pakistan

Quarterfinals; 8–10 March
Auckland, New Zealand (hard)
New Zealand	5
Chinese Taipei	0
Shanghai, China (clay)
China	3
Hong Kong	2
Bangkok, Thailand (hard)
Philippines	4
Thailand	1
Islamabad, Pakistan (clay)
South Korea	4
Pakistan	1

Semifinals; 10–12 May
Wellington, New Zealand (indoor hard)
New Zealand	5
China	0
Manila, Philippines (hard)
Philippines	0
South Korea	5

Final; 4–6 October
Christchurch, New Zealand (grass)
New Zealand	4
South Korea	0

== First round ==
=== Chinese Taipei vs. Sri Lanka ===
Chinese Taipei
5
Taipei, Taiwan
18–20 January 1985
Hard (indoors)

Sri Lanka
0

			1	2	3	4	5
1	(Chinese Taipei) (Sri Lanka)	Hsu Huang-jung; Niranjan Casie Chitty	6; 1	6; 1	6; 0
2	(Chinese Taipei) (Sri Lanka)	Wu Chang-rung; Arjun Fernando	6; 3	9; 7	6; 4
3	(Chinese Taipei) (Sri Lanka)	Hsu Huang-jung / Wu Chang-rung; Niranjan Casie Chitty / Arjun Fernando	6; 1	6; 4	7; 5
4	(Chinese Taipei) (Sri Lanka)	Hsu Huang-jung; Arjun Fernando	6; 4	6; 2
5	(Chinese Taipei) (Sri Lanka)	Wu Chang-rung; Niranjan Casie Chitty	6; 1	6; 2

=== Singapore vs. Hong Kong ===
Singapore
1
Singapore Cricket Club, Singapore
18–20 January 1985
Grass

Hong Kong
4

			1	2	3	4	5
1	(Singapore) (Hong Kong)	Albert Teo; Kelvin Ng	7; 9	5; 7	1; 6
2	(Singapore) (Hong Kong)	Mahader Hassan; Mark Bailey	4; 6	6; 3	6; 4	3; 6	6; 4
3	(Singapore) (Hong Kong)	Mahader Hassan / Victor Pereira; Randall King / Kelvin Ng	7; 9	6; 3	6; 8	3; 6
4	(Singapore) (Hong Kong)	Mahader Hassan; Kelvin Ng	1; 6	2; 6	7; 9
5	(Singapore) (Hong Kong)	Albert Teo; Mark Bailey	4; 6	4; 6	2; 6

=== Malaysia vs. Philippines ===
Malaysia
0
Selangor Tennis Club, Kuala Lumpur, Malaysia
18–20 January 1985
Grass

Philippines
5

			1	2	3	4	5
1	(Malaysia) (Philippines)	Selvarajoo Selvarajoo; Felix Barrientos	1; 6	2; 6	3; 6
2	(Malaysia) (Philippines)	Adam Malik; Rodrigo Rafael	6; 4	4; 6	4; 6	0; 6
3	(Malaysia) (Philippines)	Adam Malik / Selvarajoo Selvarajoo; Felix Barrientos / Raymundo Suarez	3; 6	4; 6	3; 6
4	(Malaysia) (Philippines)	Adam Malik; Felix Barrientos	7; 9	5; 7
5	(Malaysia) (Philippines)	Kian Wah Yeo; Manny Tolentino	4; 6	2; 6

=== South Korea vs. Indonesia ===
South Korea
5
Jamsil Arena, Seoul, South Korea
18–20 January 1985
Carpet (indoors)

Indonesia
0

			1	2	3	4	5
1	(South Korea) (Indonesia)	Roh Gap-taik; Tintus Arianto Wibowo	6; 4	6; 2	6; 2
2	(South Korea) (Indonesia)	Jeon Young-dai; Hary Suharyadi	8; 6	6; 2	6; 0
3	(South Korea) (Indonesia)	Kim Bong-soo / Yoo Jin-sun; Donald Wailan-Walalangi / Ludi Wijono	6; 4	10; 8	6; 2
4	(South Korea) (Indonesia)	Jeon Young-dai; Tintus Arianto Wibowo	6; 3					retired
5	(South Korea) (Indonesia)	Roh Gap-taik; Hary Suharyadi	6; 1	6; 3

== Quarterfinals ==
=== New Zealand vs. Chinese Taipei ===
New Zealand
5
Stanley Street, Auckland, New Zealand
8–10 March 1985
Hard

Chinese Taipei
0

			1	2	3	4	5
1	(New Zealand) (Chinese Taipei)	David Mustard; Hsu Huang-jung	6; 1	6; 1	6; 1
2	(New Zealand) (Chinese Taipei)	Russell Simpson; Wu Chang-rung	6; 4	6; 2	6; 3
3	(New Zealand) (Chinese Taipei)	David Lewis / David Mustard; Hsu Huang-jung / Liu Chung-hsing	6; 3	6; 1	6; 4
4	(New Zealand) (Chinese Taipei)	David Lewis; Wu Chang-rung	6; 1	6; 3
5	(New Zealand) (Chinese Taipei)	Russell Simpson; Liu Chung-hsing	4; 3					retired

=== China vs. Hong Kong ===
China
3
Shanghai, China
8–10 March 1985
Clay

Hong Kong
2

			1	2	3	4	5
1	(China) (Hong Kong)	You Wei; Mark Bailey	9; 7	6; 1	6; 3
2	(China) (Hong Kong)	Xie Zhao; Colin Grant	3; 6	6; 0	6; 0	6; 2
3	(China) (Hong Kong)	Li Shiqin / Zhang Fan; Mark Bailey / Colin Grant	12; 14	2; 6	8; 10
4	(China) (Hong Kong)	You Wei; Colin Grant	3; 6	2; 6	6; 1	8; 6	6; 3
5	(China) (Hong Kong)	Xie Zhao; Mark Bailey	3; 6	5; 7

=== Thailand vs. Philippines ===
Thailand
1
Bangkok, Thailand
8–10 March 1985
Hard

Philippines
4

			1	2	3	4	5
1	(Thailand) (Philippines)	Chareonchai Tritilinant; Rodrigo Rafael	4; 6	1; 6	3; 6
2	(Thailand) (Philippines)	Tanakorn Srichaphan; Felix Barrientos	5; 7	10; 12	6; 4	1; 6
3	(Thailand) (Philippines)	Somchai Phukaeow / Vittaya Samrej; Felix Barrientos / Raymundo Suarez	2; 6	6; 1	4; 6	2; 6
4	(Thailand) (Philippines)	Tanakorn Srichaphan; Manny Tolentino	4; 6	6; 0	2; 0			retired
5	(Thailand) (Philippines)	Chareonchai Tritilinant; Raymundo Suarez	2; 6	0; 6

=== Pakistan vs. South Korea ===
Pakistan
1
Islamabad, Pakistan
8–10 March 1985
Clay

South Korea
4

			1	2	3	4	5
1	(Pakistan) (South Korea)	Hamed-ul-Haq; Jeon Young-dai	2; 6	2; 6	4; 6
2	(Pakistan) (South Korea)	Islam-ul-Haq; Kim Bong-soo	4; 6	2; 6	3; 6
3	(Pakistan) (South Korea)	Islam-ul-Haq / Mushaf Zia; Kim Bong-soo / Yoo Jin-sun	3; 6	4; 6	6; 3	4; 6
4	(Pakistan) (South Korea)	Rashid Malik; Roh Gap-taik	5; 7	2; 6
5	(Pakistan) (South Korea)	Mushaf Zia; Yoo Jin-sun	1; 6	6; 3	6; 4

== Semifinals ==
=== New Zealand vs. China ===
New Zealand
5
Winter Sporting Club, Wellington, New Zealand
10–12 May 1985
Hard (indoors)

China
0

			1	2	3	4	5
1	(New Zealand) (China)	Chris Lewis; You Wei	6; 1	6; 2	6; 4
2	(New Zealand) (China)	Russell Simpson; Xie Zhao	6; 4	6; 1	6; 2
3	(New Zealand) (China)	Kelly Evernden / Chris Lewis; Xie Zhao / You Wei	6; 4	6; 3	6; 3
4	(New Zealand) (China)	Chris Lewis; Zhang Fan	7; 5	7; 5
5	(New Zealand) (China)	Steve Guy; You Wei	6; 1	6; 1

=== Philippines vs. South Korea ===
Philippines
0
Manila, Philippines
10–12 May 1985
Hard

South Korea
5

			1	2	3	4	5
1	(Philippines) (South Korea)	Manny Tolentino; Jeon Young-dai	3; 6	6; 3	0; 6	3; 6
2	(Philippines) (South Korea)	Rodrigo Rafael; Yoo Jin-sun	6; 8	8; 10	0; 6
3	(Philippines) (South Korea)	Rodrigo Rafael / Raymundo Suarez; Kim Bong-soo / Yoo Jin-sun	6; 4	1; 6	6; 1	6; 8	3; 6
4	(Philippines) (South Korea)	Rodrigo Rafael; Jeon Young-dai	3; 6	2; 6
5	(Philippines) (South Korea)	Manny Tolentino; Kim Bong-soo	0; 6	2; 6

== Final ==
=== New Zealand vs. South Korea ===
New Zealand
4
Wilding Park, Christchurch, New Zealand
4–6 October 1985
Grass

South Korea
0

			1	2	3	4	5
1	(New Zealand) (South Korea)	Kelly Evernden; Roh Gap-taik	6; 3	6; 2	6; 4
2	(New Zealand) (South Korea)	Chris Lewis; Kim Bong-soo	6; 4	6; 4	6; 2
3	(New Zealand) (South Korea)	Kelly Evernden / Russell Simpson; Jeon Young-dai / Yoo Jin-sun	5; 7	6; 3	6; 2	6; 4
4	(New Zealand) (South Korea)	Kelly Evernden; Kim Bong-soo	9; 7	6; 4
5	(New Zealand) (South Korea)	Chris Lewis; Roh Gap-taik						not played
