= PCA Open =

Tournament information
- Founded: 1982; 44 years ago
- Editions: 42 (2025)
- Location: Manila
- Venue: Philippine Columbian Association Complex, Paco
- Surface: Hard

Current champions (2025 PCA Open)
- Men's singles: Alberto Lim Jr.
- Women's singles: Tennielle Madis
- Men's doubles: Johnny Arcilla; Bryan Saarenas
- Women's doubles: Tennielle Madis; Stefi Marithe Aludo

The PCA Open is a tennis open tournament in the Philippines organized by the Philippine Columbian Association (PCA). It is sanctioned by the Philippine Tennis Association.

Billed as "the Wimbledon of the Philippines", the tournament has seen the participation of the Philippines' top players who have also taken part at the Davis and Billie Jean King Cups.

== History ==
The Philippine Columbian Association (PCA) hosted the first PCA Open in 1982. Manny Tolentino is the inaugural men's single winner.

Held annually, the PCA Open has become the top tennis tournament of the Philippines. Foreign players has been invited to take part as early as the 1990s with South Korean player Yoon Yong-il becoming the first foreigner to win in the PCA Open when he clinched the men's single event in 1995.

The PCA Open was disrupted by the COVID-19 pandemic and was not held in 2020 and 2021. The annual tournament resumed in 2022.

== Results ==
=== Men's singles ===
Year	Champion	Runners-up	Score	Ref.
1982	(Philippines) Manny Tolentino	(Philippines) Ody Gabriel		
1983	(Philippines) Ody Gabriel			
1984	(Philippines) Manny Tolentino (2–3) (Philippines) No information			
1985	(Philippines) Manny Tolentino (2–3) (Philippines) No information			
1986	(Philippines) Manny Tolentino (2–3) (Philippines) No information			
1987	(Philippines) Raymond Suarez	(Philippines) Manny Tolentino	7–5, 6–2, 7–6	
1988	(Philippines) Ringo Navarossa			
1989	No information			
1990	(Philippines) Roland So	(Philippines) Manny Tolentino		
1991	(Philippines) Jun Alerre	(Philippines) Robert Angelo		
1992	(Philippines) Robert Angelo	(Philippines) Joseph Lizardo	5–7, 6–0, 6–4, 6–1	
1993	No information			
1994	(Philippines) Pio Tolentino	(South Korea) Park Seung-kyu		
1995	(South Korea) Yoon Yong-il	(Philippines) Camoy Palahang		
1996	(Philippines) Robert Angelo	(Philippines) Joseph Lizardo	6–7 (8), 7–5, 6–3, 0–6, 6–2	
1997	No information			
1998	No information			
1999	(Philippines) Joseph Lizardo	(Philippines) Johnny Arcilla		
2000	(South Korea) Chung Hee-sung	(Philippines) Johnny Arcilla	6–1, 7–5, 0–6, 6–2	
2001	(Philippines) Johnny Arcilla (1)	(Philippines) Adelo Abadia	5–7, 6–3, 3–6, 6–4, 6–1	
2002	(Philippines) Joseph Victorino			
2003	(South Korea) Chung Hee-seok	(Philippines) Johnny Arcilla	2–6, 1–6, 6–3, 6–1, 6–3	
2004	(South Korea) Chung Hee-seok	(Philippines) Johnny Arcilla		
2005	(South Korea) Chung Hee-seok	(Philippines) Patrick John Tierro	3–6, 7–6 (3), 6–0, 6–1	
2006	(Philippines) Johnny Arcilla (2)	(Philippines) Rolando Ruel Jr.	7–5, 6–0, 6–4	
2007	(Philippines) Johnny Arcilla (3)	(Philippines) Patrick John Tierro	6–4, 6–3, 6–2	
2008	(Philippines) Johnny Arcilla (4)	(Philippines) Patrick John Tierro	4–6, 7–6 (5), 5–7, 6–3, 6–1	
2009	(Philippines) Johnny Arcilla (5)	(Philippines) Mark Reyes		
2010	(Germany) Marc Sieber	(Philippines) Johnny Arcilla	6–2, 6–4, 6–1	
2011	(Philippines) Johnny Arcilla (6)			
2012	(Philippines) Johnny Arcilla (7)	(Philippines) Ruben Gonzales	7–5, 7–6 (1), 0–6, 7–6 (5)	
2013	(Philippines) Johnny Arcilla (8)	(Philippines) Marc Reyes	6–1, 6–4, 6–2	
2014	No information			
2015	(Philippines) Alberto Lim Jr. (1)	(Philippines) Patrick John Tierro	6–5, 7–6 (7–5)	
2016	(Philippines) Patrick John Tierro	(Philippines) Johnny Arcilla	4–6, 7–5, 7–6 (5)	
2017	(Philippines) Bryan Otico	(Philippines) Patrick John Tierro	6–4, 6–3, 3–6, 3–6, 6–4	
2018	(Philippines) Jeson Patrombon	(Philippines) Bryan Otico	7–6 (4), 0–6, 4–6, 6–1, 6–1	
2019	(Philippines) Johnny Arcilla (9)	(Philippines) Jurence Zosimo Mendoza	6–3, 7–5, 6–3	
2020	Not held due to the COVID pandemic			
2021	Not held due to the COVID pandemic			
2022	(Philippines) Johnny Arcilla (10)	(Spain) Guillermo Olaso	7–5, 1–6, 6–1, 3-6, 6–4	
2023	(Philippines) Alberto Lim Jr. (2)	(Philippines) Andre Ilagan	6–2, 6–3, 6–4	
2024	(Philippines) Alberto Lim Jr. (3)	(Philippines) Jed Olivarez	6–3, 6–1, 6–1	
2025	(Philippines) Alberto Lim Jr. (4)	(Philippines) Jed Olivarez	6–2, 6–1, 6–4	

=== Men's doubles ===
Year	Champion	Runners-up	Score	Ref.
2023	(Philippines) Andre Ilagan (Philippines) Bryan Saarenas	(Philippines) Ronard Joven (Philippines) Johnny Arcilla	7–6 (7–4), 3–6, 10–8	
2024	(Philippines) Toto Joven (Philippines) Jude Michael Padao	(Philippines) Eric Jed Olivarez (Philippines) Patrick John Tierro	6–2, 6–2	
2025	(Philippines) Johnny Arcilla (Philippines) Bryan Saarenas	(Philippines) Fritz Chris Verdad (Philippines) Rolly Saga	6–3, 5–7, 11–9	

=== Women's singles ===
Year	Champion	Runners-up	Score	Ref.
1992	No information			
1983	No information			
1984	No information			
1985	No information			
1986	(Philippines) Sarah Rafael (1)			
1987	(Philippines) Sarah Rafael (2)	(Philippines) Jennifer Saberon	2–6, 6–4, 6–1	
1988	(Philippines) Sarah Rafael (3)			
1989	(Philippines) Jennifer Saret (1)	(Philippines) Sarah Castillejo		
1990	(Philippines) Jennifer Saret (2)			
1991	(Philippines) Jennifer Saret (3)	(Philippines) Dorothy Jane Suarez		
1992	(Philippines) Jennifer Saret (4)	(Philippines) Joanna Ferla		
1993	(Philippines) Eve Olivarez			
1994	(Philippines) Maricris Fernandez (1)	(South Korea) Shin Hyun-a	6–3, 1–6, 7–5	
1995	No information			
1996	(Philippines) Maricris Fernandez (2)	(South Korea) Shin Hyun-a	6–2, 6–4	
1997	No information			
1998	No information			
1999	No information			
2000	(South Korea) Kim Hye-jin	(South Korea) Ha Jin-sun	6–3, 6–3	
2001	(India) Sonal Phadke	(Philippines) Czarina Arevalo	6–4, 6–2	
2002	(Philippines) Czarina Arevalo (1)	(South Korea) Lee Min-hee	6–1, 6–4	
2003	(Philippines) Czarina Arevalo (2)	(Philippines) Alyssa Anne Labay	6–1, 6–0	
2004	No information			
2005	(Philippines) Czarina Arevalo (3)	(Philippines) Bambi Zoleta	6–1, 6–3	
2006	(Philippines) Denise Dy	(Philippines) Bambi Zoleta	7–5, 6–4	
2007	(Philippines) Czarina Arevalo (4)	(Guam) Michelle Pang	6–3, 6–1	
2008	(Philippines) Bambi Zoleta	(Philippines) Czarina Arevalo	6–2, 4–6, 6–2	
2009	(Philippines) Czarina Arevalo (5)	(Philippines) Christine Patrimonio		
2010	(United States) Desirae Krawczyk	(Philippines) Christine Patrimonio	7–6 (1), 6–3	
2011	(Philippines) Marian Capadocia (1)	(Philippines) Clarice Patrimonio		
2012	(Philippines) Marian Capadocia (2)	(Philippines) Katharina Lehnert	6–3, 3–6, 6–3	
2013	(Philippines) Marian Capadocia (3)	(Philippines) Clarice Patrimonio	6–1, 7–5, 6–4	
2014	(Philippines) Marian Capadocia (4)	(Philippines) Maika Tanpoco		
2015	(Philippines) Clarice Patrimonio (1)	(Philippines) Maia Balce	6–4, 6–3	
2016	(Philippines) Clarice Patrimonio (2)	(Philippines) Christine Patrimonio	4–6, 6–0, 6–2	
2017	(Philippines) Marian Capadocia (5)	(Philippines) Clarice Patrimonio	6–3, 6–4	
2018	(Philippines) Marian Capadocia (6)	(Philippines) Shaira Hope Rivera	6–4, 6–3	
2019	(Philippines) Marian Capadocia (7)	(Philippines) Jennila Rose Prulla	6–1, 6–0	
2020	Not held due to the COVID pandemic			
2021	Not held due to the COVID pandemic			
2022	(Philippines) Jenaila Rose Prulla (1)	(Philippines) Marian Capadocia	6–3, 7–6 (3)	
2023	(Philippines) Marian Capadocia (8)	(Philippines) Tennielle Madis	6–0, 6–1	
2024	(Philippines) Marian Capadocia (9)	(Philippines) Khim Iglupas	6–2, 6–4	
2025	(Philippines) Tennielle Madis	(Philippines) Kaye Anne Emana	6–0, 6–3	

=== Women's doubles ===
Year	Champion	Runners-up	Score	Ref.
2023	(Philippines) Shaira Hope Rivera (Philippines) Allyssa Mae Bornia	(Philippines) Rovie Baulate (Philippines) Elsie Abarquez	6–4, 6–3	
2024	(Philippines) Rovie Baulate (Philippines) Elsie Abarquez	(Philippines) Bambi Zoleta (Philippines) Aileen Rogan	6–3, 6–2	
2025	(Philippines) Tennielle Madis (Philippines) Stefi Marithe Aludo	(Philippines) Elsie Abarquez (Philippines) Rovie Baulate	6–3, 6–3	

=== Mixed doubles ===
Year	Champion	Runners-up	Score	Ref.
2023	(Philippines) Shaira Hope Rivera (Philippines) Elbert Anasta	(Philippines) Allyssa Mae Bornia (Philippines) Ronard Joven	7–5, 6–2	
2024	(Philippines) Johnny Arcilla (Philippines) Angeline Alcala	(Philippines) Noel Damian (Philippines) Alexa Milliam	6–2, 6–3	

== See also ==
- Mitsubishi Lancer International Junior Tennis Championship
