= Tennis at the 1984 Summer Olympics – Men's singles =

Men's singles
- Tennis at the 1984 Summer Olympics

Events
Singles	men	women
← 1968 ·	Summer Olympics	· 1988 →

Below are the complete results of the men's singles tennis competition during the 1984 Summer Olympics in Los Angeles, when tennis was re-introduced as a demonstration sport.

== Seeds ==
1. Jimmy Arias (USA) (semifinals)
2. Pat Cash (AUS) (first round)
3. Stefan Edberg (SWE) (champion)
4. Emilio Sánchez (ESP) (second round)
5. Jakob Hlasek (SUI) (quarterfinals)
6. Michael Westphal (FRG) (quarterfinals)
7. Simon Youl (AUS) (quarterfinals)
8. Guy Forget (FRA) (quarterfinals)

== Draw ==
=== Finals ===
Semifinals
1	Jimmy Arias (USA)	2	1
3	Stefan Edberg (SWE)	6	6
Francisco Maciel (MEX)	6	6
Paolo Canè (ITA)	2	0

Final
3	Stefan Edberg (SWE)	6	7^{8}
Francisco Maciel (MEX)	1	6^{6}

=== Top half ===
First round
1	J Arias (USA)	6	6
J Yzaga (PER)	1	4
K Jones (USA)	2	6	6
S Suharyadi (INA)	6	2	3
E Amend (USA)	6	3	6
M Tolentino (PHI)	3	6	3
G-t Roh (KOR)	3	5
6	M Westphal (FRG)	6	7
3	S Edberg (SWE)	6	6
R Agénor (HAI)	4	2
A Mansdorf (ISR)	2	6^{1}
C di Laura (PER)	6	7^{7}
T Muster (AUT)	6	6
O Rahnasto (FIN)	4	4
O Lourenco (ZIM)	3	1
8	G Forget (FRA)	6	6

Second round
1	J Arias (USA)	6	6
K Jones (USA)	2	4
E Amend (USA)	5	2
6	M Westphal (FRG)	7	6
3	S Edberg (SWE)	7^{7}	7^{7}
C di Laura (PER)	6^{2}	6^{1}
T Muster (AUT)	6	3	2
8	G Forget (FRA)	4	6	6

Quarterfinals
1	J Arias (USA)	7	6
6	M Westphal (FRG)	5	4
3	S Edberg (SWE)	6	7
8	G Forget (FRA)	4	5

Semifinals
1	J Arias (USA)	2	1
3	S Edberg (SWE)	6	6

=== Bottom half ===
First round
5	J Hlasek (SUI)	6	4	6
L Courteau (FRA)	0	6	4
J Bardou (ESP)	6	6
A Bavelas (GRE)	1	4
F Maciel (MEX)	6	7^{7}
D Rostagno (USA)	4	6^{4}
M Fioroni (ITA)	4	1
4	E Sánchez (ESP)	6	6
7	S Youl (AUS)	6	4	6
Y Suleiman (NGR)	0	6	2
G Nair (IND)	2	1
S Bale (GBR)	6	6
D Li (CHN)	2	6	3
A Chekrouni (MAR)	6	3	6
P Canè (ITA)	6	7^{7}
2	P Cash (AUS)	3	6^{3}

Second round
5	J Hlasek (SUI)	6	6
J Bardou (ESP)	2	2
F Maciel (MEX)	6	6
4	E Sánchez (ESP)	4	4
7	S Youl (AUS)	4	6	7
S Bale (GBR)	6	4	5
A Chekrouni (MAR)	2	4
P Canè (ITA)	6	6

Quarterfinals
5	J Hlasek (SUI)	6	2	5
F Maciel (MEX)	3	6	7
7	S Youl (AUS)	0	r
P Canè (ITA)	2

Semifinals
F Maciel (MEX)	6	6
P Canè (ITA)	2	0
