= Rich Benson =

American tennis player (born 1967)

- Full name: Richard John Benson
- Country (sports): United States
- Born: 1967 (age 58–59)
- Prize money: $29,186

Singles
- Career record: 0–0
- Highest ranking: No. 525 (Apr 22, 1991)

Doubles
- Career record: 6–12
- Highest ranking: No. 149 (Nov 15, 1993)

Richard John Benson (born 1967) is an American former professional tennis player.

Benson, who grew up in Ogden, Utah, was a collegiate tennis player at the University of Kentucky in the late 1980s, earning All-American honors for doubles on three occasions. He was a semi-finalist in the 1987 NCAA doubles championships, with Greg Van Emburgh as his partner.

During the 1990s he competed on the professional tour, specialising in doubles at ATP Tour level. In 1993 he reached the doubles semi-finals of an ATP Tour tournament in Kuala Lumpur, partnering with local player Adam Malik, with whom he won the Wolfsburg Challenger title the following year.

== Challenger titles ==
=== Doubles: (1) ===
No.	Year	Tournament	Surface	Partner	Opponents	Score
1.	1994	Wolfsburg, Germany	Carpet	(Malaysia) Adam Malik	(Australia) Wayne Arthurs (Australia) Simon Youl	7–6, 6–4

== Personal life ==
Benson married wife Paula in 1998 at a ceremony in Louisville. The couple have raised three children.
