= Philippine Columbian Association =

Country club in Manila, Philippines

- Abbreviation: PCA
- Formation: December 14, 1907; 118 years ago
- Founded at: Pasay, Rizal, Philippine Islands
- Purpose: Country club
- Location: Manila, Philippines
- Coordinates: 14°34′55.0″N 121°00′00.1″E
- Website: www.philippinecolumbianassociation.com

The Philippine Columbian Association (PCA) is a country club based in Manila, Philippines.

== History ==
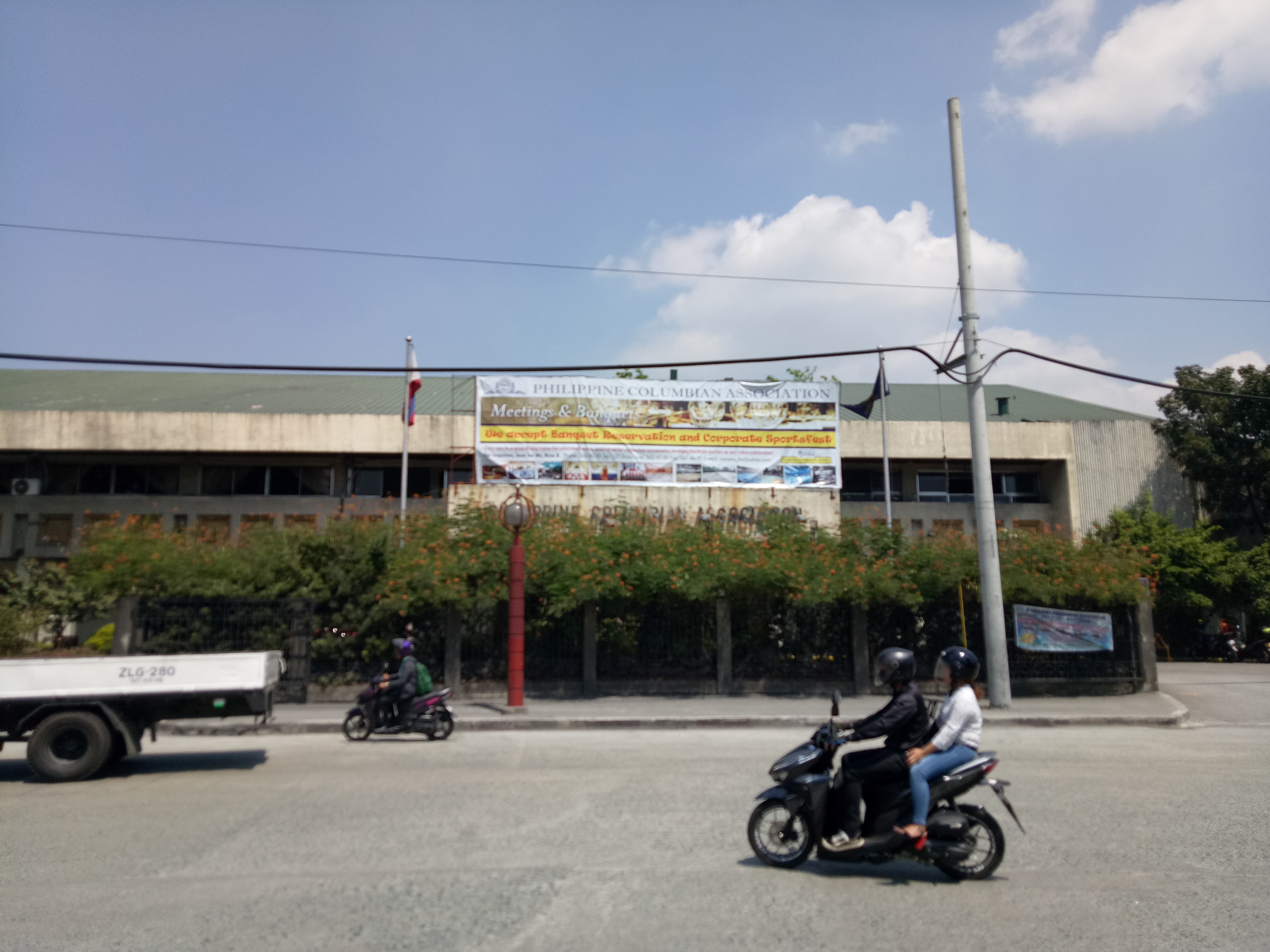
The current PCA complex built in 1979.

The Philippine Columbian Association (PCA) was established in December 14, 1907 by Filipinos educated in the United States. It was meant to foster ties between Filipinos and foreigners. Ponciano Reyes served as the PCA's first president. In the same year, a nipa clubhouse was constructed in Pasay funded by Teodoro Yangco.

In 1923, a new clubhouse was built under 9th Columbian President Antonio de las Alas along Taft Avenue in Manila.

The Taft Avenue clubhouse was destroyed during the 1945 Battle of Manila during World War II. A third clubhouse was built and inaugurated in 1953 during the term of Columbian president Ramon Ordoveza.

The current and fourth clubhouse was built in inaugurated on December 14, 1979 under Columbian president Ponciano Marquez.

== Sports ==
The Philippine Columbian Association is known for its role in tennis with its complex being the frequent host of home games of the Philippines Davis Cup team and its own tournament, the PCA Open since 1982. The PCA Open has held its 42nd edition in 2025.

The PCA complex also has an indoor archery range, a swimming pool, a bowling center, an open basketball court, a gymnasium, as well as facilities for badminton and table tennis.
