= Tetsu Kuramitsu =

Japanese tennis player (born 1944)

- Native name: 倉光哲
- Country (sports): Japan
- Born: 9 July 1944 (age 81)

Singles
- Career record: 1–9
- Highest ranking: No. 281 (2 July 1977)

Grand Slam singles results
- Wimbledon: Q1 (1976, 1977, 1978)

Doubles
- Career record: 1–4

Grand Slam doubles results
- Wimbledon: Q2 (1978)

Tetsu Kuramitsu (born 9 July 1944) is a Japanese former professional tennis player.

Kuramitsu, during his recent years on Rikkyo University, competed in the Orange Bowl as a junior player. He was a singles bronze medalist for Japan at the 1978 Asian Games in Bangkok. During his time on the professional tour he ranked as high as 281 in the world, making qualifying draw appearances at Wimbledon. He reached the second round of the 1979 Japan Open and made an ATP Challenger semi-final at Sapporo in 1986.
