= 1979 Japan Open Tennis Championships =

- Date: 22–28 October
- Edition: 6th
- Prize money: $125,000 (men) $35,000 (women)
- Surface: Clay / outdoor
- Location: Tokyo, Japan

Champions

Men's singles
- (United States) Terry Moor

Women's singles
- (United States) Betsy Nagelsen

Men's doubles
- (Australia) Colin Dibley / (United States) Pat Du Pré

Women's doubles
- (United States) Betsy Nagelsen / (United States) Penny Johnson
- Japan Open

The 1979 Japan Open Tennis Championships, also known by its sponsorship name Hit-Union Japan Open Tennis Championships, was a combined men's and women's tennis tournament played on outdoor clay courts in Tokyo, Japan that was part of the women's Colgate Series and the men's Volvo Grand Prix circuit. The tournament was held from 22 October through 28 October 1979. Terry Moor (ninth-seeded) and Betsy Nagelsen won the singles titles.

== Finals ==
=== Men's singles ===
(United States) Terry Moor defeated (United States) Pat Du Pré 3–6, 7–6, 6–2

- It was Moor's 1st title of the year and the 1st of his career.

=== Women's singles ===
(United States) Betsy Nagelsen defeated (United States) Naoko Sato 6–1, 3–6, 6–3

- It was Nagelsen's 2nd title of the year and the 2nd of her career.

=== Men's doubles ===
(Australia) Colin Dibley / (United States) Pat Du Pré defeated (Australia) Rod Frawley / (Paraguay) Francisco González 3–6, 6–1, 6–1

=== Women's doubles ===
(United States) Betsy Nagelsen / (United States) Penny Johnson defeated (China) Yu Li-Chiao / (China) Chen Chuan 3–6, 6–4, 7–5
