= Ody Gabriel =

- Country (sports): Philippines
- Born: 1953 or 1954 (age 71–72)

Rodolfo "Ody" Gabriel (born 1953 or 1954) is a retired tennis player.

== Career ==
Ody Gabriel was part of the Philippines Davis Cup team. He played from 1978 to 1984.

Gabriel was the 1983 PCA Open men's single champion. He also took part in the inaugural edition in 1982, losing to a 16-year old Manny Tolentino in the men's single final.

He was also the top ranked doubles player in the Philippines alongside Bernardo Valleramos in 1984. He was the men's doubles PCA Open runners-up in 1982, 1985, and 1986.

He retired from competitive tennis after playing in the 1987 Olivarez Cup although he briefly returned for the 1988 PCA Open. He later transitioned into a tennis coach.
