= Randall King =

American-born Hong Kong tennis player

- Country (sports): United States (British Hong Kong) Hong Kong
- Born: April 2, 1950 (age 76) Portland, Oregon, U.S.
- Plays: Right-handed

Singles
- Career record: 0–2
- Highest ranking: No. 269 (July 3, 1977)

Doubles
- Career record: 0–3
- Highest ranking: No. 727 (July 16, 1984)

Grand Slam doubles results
- US Open: 1R (1977)

Randall King (born April 2, 1950) is an American-born former professional tennis player. A native of Portland, Oregon, King played Davis Cup tennis for Hong Kong during the 1980s.

King reached a career high singles ranking of 269 in the world while competing on the professional tour and featured in the men's doubles main draw of the 1977 US Open.

From 1984 to 1986, by then based in Hong Kong, he represented the territory in five Davis Cup ties. In 1984 he won the doubles rubber in Hong Kong's historic 3-2 win over Taiwan, which was their first ever victory in a Davis Cup tie.
