= Frank Sebaratnam =

Sri Lankan tennis player

Frank Vinothinan Sebaratnam is a professional tennis player who has competed at an international level. He is the former No 1 player in Sri Lanka and represented his country at the Davis Cup.

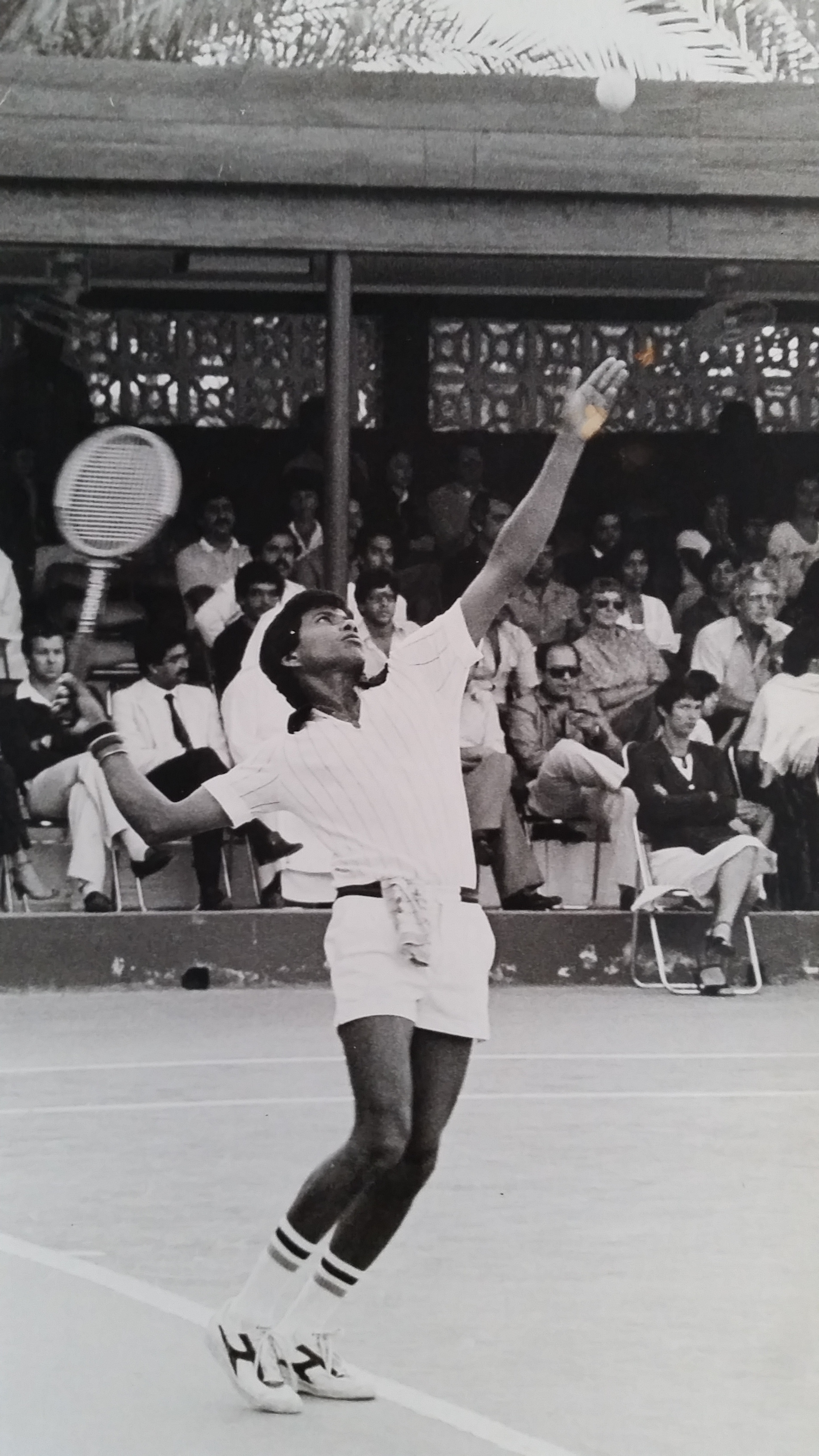
Frank Sebaratnam

== Early career ==
Frank Sebaratnam was born in Jaffna, Sri Lanka, to Lourdes and Christopher Sebaratnam. Coached by his father, he showed early promise winning the Singles title at the Juvenile National Tennis Championships at the age of 11.

== Professional career ==
After winning numerous regional competitions, Frank moved to Colombo to further pursue his career aspirations, eventually winning the National title in 1985 and 1986. Following his national successes, he went on to compete in the Davis Cup representing Sri Lanka several times throughout the mid 1980s.

== Later career ==
After immigrating to Sydney, Australia with his family, Frank became a full-time tennis coach leading a tennis academy in Sydney's north west. He continues to play competitive tennis in the International Tennis Federation's Senior League with the highest Singles ranking of 49 and highest Doubles ranking of 5.

== Legacy ==
During the height of his career, Frank Sebaratnam was a household name in Sri Lanka and held several endorsements with sporting goods companies. To this day, his legacy is referenced when Sri Lankan tennis is discussed. The Frank Vinothinan prize awarded by the UNSW Faculty of Medicine is named in honour him
