= Sombat Uamongkol =

Thai tennis player

- Country (sports): Thailand
- Plays: Right-handed

Singles
- Career record: 7–13 (ATP Tour & Davis Cup)
- Highest ranking: No. 525 (28 July 1986)

Doubles
- Career record: 5-4 (ATP Tour & Davis Cup)
- Highest ranking: No. 682 (28 July 1986)
Medal record
Asian Games
Bronze medal – third place	1986 Seoul	Men's team
Southeast Asian Games
Gold medal – first place	1983 Singapore	Men's doubles
Silver medal – second place	1981 Manila	Men's singles
Bronze medal – third place	1979 Jakarta	Men's doubles
Bronze medal – third place	1983 Singapore	Men's singles
Bronze medal – third place	1983 Singapore	Men's team
Bronze medal – third place	1985 Bangkok	Men's doubles
Bronze medal – third place	1985 Bangkok	Men's team

Sombat Uamongkol is a Thai former professional tennis player.

Uamongkol registered a highest singles world ranking of 525 and represented Thailand in the Davis Cup from 1981 to 1986. Featuring in a total of 10 Davis Cup ties, he had wins in seven singles and five doubles rubbers. He was a medalist for Thailand at both the Asian Games and Southeast Asian Games.

Since 2019, Uamongkol has served as president of the Asian Tennis Federation.
