= Eiji Takeuchi =

Japanese tennis player and coach (born 1959)

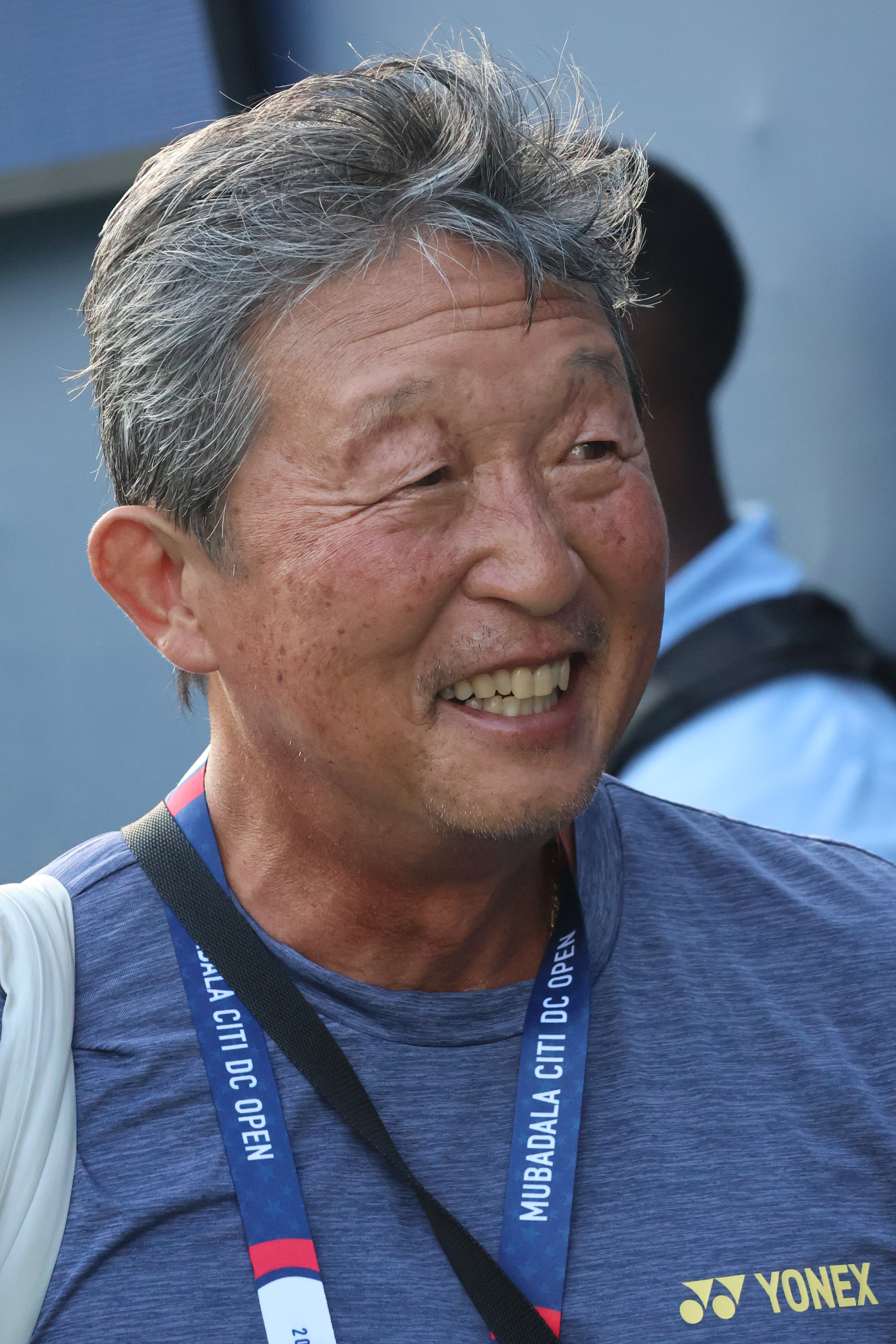
- Takeuchi in 2024
- Native name: 竹内映二
- Country (sports): Japan
- Born: 13 May 1959 (age 66)
- Prize money: $11,298

Singles
- Career record: 1–5
- Highest ranking: No. 402 (6 May 1985)

Grand Slam singles results
- Wimbledon: Q1 (1986)

Doubles
- Career record: 4–11
- Highest ranking: No. 241 (15 July 1985)

Grand Slam doubles results
- Australian Open: 1R (1989)

Eiji Takeuchi (born 13 May 1959) is a Japanese tennis coach and former professional player.

Takeuchi was a member of Japan's Davis Cup side during the 1980s. He appeared in a total of seven ties, including a 1985 Davis Cup World Group relegation play-off against Spain.

His best performance on the Grand Prix circuit came in the 1981 Japan Open, where he reached the second round.

Takeuchi featured in the singles qualifying draw for the 1986 Wimbledon Championships and the doubles main draw at the 1989 Australian Open, as an alternate pairing with Hitoshi Shirato.

Following his playing career he became a tennis coach and has captained Japan in the Davis Cup. Most notably he led Japan to a World Group playoff win over India in 2011, which secured the team a place in the World Group for the first time since 1985.

== See also ==
- List of Japan Davis Cup team representatives
