= Manny Tolentino =

Filipino tennis player (born 1966)

- Country (sports): Philippines
- Born: March 27, 1966 (age 59)

Singles

Other tournaments
- Olympic Games: R1 (1984, demonstration)

Manuel Tolentino (born March 27, 1966) is a former tennis player from the Philippines.

== Career ==
In 1982, Tolentino clinched the men's single title at the PCA Open at age 16 over 28-year old Ody Gabriel. This made Tolentino the winner who had the widest age gap with their final opponent of 12 years. This record would be broken by 18-year old Bryan Otico who won a PCA Open title against an opponent 14 years older than himself. Tolentino also became the youngest PCA Open champion, a record broken by Alberto Lim Jr. in 2015 by two months. By 1988, Tolentino won two more men's single titles.

Tolentino represented the Philippines at the 1984 Summer Olympics in Los Angeles, where he was defeated in the first round by the United States' Eric Amend.

Tolentino for a time was the top player in the ITF junior rankings. The right-hander reached his highest singles ATP-ranking on August 31, 1987, when he became world No. 437. Tolentino participated in Davis Cup ties for the Philippines from 1984 to 1987, posting a 4–5 record in singles. Tolentino was imposed a six month suspension for refusing to train with the Philippines Davis Cup team in January 1988. This was reduced to four months, enabling him to compete in professional tournaments again in April 1988.

== Post-retirement ==
As of 2020, Tolentino is based in the San Francisco Bay Area in the United States.
