= Liu Shuhua =

Chinese tennis player

- Full name: Liu Shuhua
- Country (sports): China
- Born: 23 October 1962 (age 62)
- Height: 189 cm (6 ft 2 in)

Liu Shuhua (born 23 October 1962) is a former professional tennis player from China.

== Biography ==
Debuting for the China Davis Cup team in 1983, Shuhua went on to feature in a total of 15 ties, for a 19/12 win-loss record.

Shuhua won multiple Asian Games medals for China, including bronze medals at the singles events in 1982 and 1986, as well as three medals in doubles.

At the 1988 Summer Olympics in Barcelona he was a member of the Chinese team, partnering Ma Keqin in the men's doubles. They lost in the first round to the eventual bronze medal winning Czechoslovak pairing of Miloslav Mečíř and Milan Šrejber.
