= Adam Malik (tennis) =

Malaysian tennis player

- Country (sports): Malaysia
- Born: 10 May 1967 (age 58); Muar, Johor, Malaysia
- Height: 1.93 m (6 ft 4 in)
- Plays: Right-handed
- Prize money: $63,365

Singles
- Career record: 2–3
- Career titles: 0
- Highest ranking: No. 436 (10 April 1995)

Doubles
- Career record: 9–15
- Career titles: 0
- Highest ranking: No. 122 (25 July 1994)

Grand Slam doubles results
- Australian Open: 1R (1995)

Adam Malik (born 10 May 1967) is a former professional tennis player from Malaysia.

== Career ==
Malik was just 14 when he made his Davis Cup debut for Malaysia, against Indonesia in 1982.

He moved to Australia at the age of 16 to attend boarding school. After he completed his schooling he studied at the University of Kentucky in the United States. He played NCAA tennis for the University of Kentucky and was an All-American in both singles and doubles, before becoming the first ever Malaysian player to turn professional.

It would be in doubles that he had most of his success on the ATP Tour. Malik and his former NCAA partner, Rich Benson, made the semi-finals of the Kuala Lumpur Open in 1993. Also that year, Malik and Francisco Montana, upset top seeds Jacco Eltingh and Paul Haarhuis at the 1993 Schenectady Open. In 1994, Malik teamed up with Jeff Tarango in the ATP St. Pölten event and the pair finished runners-up. He remained with Tarango for the 1995 Australian Open, the only Grand Slam tournament that the Malaysian played during his career. The pair lost in the opening round to Jon Ireland and Libor Pimek, losing 7–9 in the deciding set.

He had his best singles performance at the Kuala Lumpur Open in 1994, when he reached the quarter-finals.

By the time he made his last Davis Cup appearance in 1995, Malik had taken part in 13 ties for Malaysia and played 32 rubbers, from which he won 17. He won 12 of his 20 singles matches and five of his 12 doubles fixtures.

Since retiring, Malik has worked as a businessman in the United States, but has also spent some time coaching the Malaysian Davis Cup team.

== ATP career finals ==
=== Doubles: 1 (0–1) ===
| Result | W-L | Date | Tournament | Surface | Partner | Opponents | Score |
|---|---|---|---|---|---|---|---|
| Loss | 0–1 | Jun 1994 | Sankt Pölten, Austria | Clay | (United States) Jeff Tarango | (Czech Republic) Vojtěch Flégl (Australia) Andrew Florent | 6–3, 1–6, 4–6 |

== Challenger titles ==
=== Doubles: (1) ===
| No. | Date | Tournament | Surface | Partner | Opponents | Score |
|---|---|---|---|---|---|---|
| 1. | 1994 | Wolfsburg, Germany | Carpet | (United States) Rich Benson | (Australia) Wayne Arthurs (Australia) Simon Youl | 7–6, 6–4 |
