= Shozo Shiraishi =

Japanese tennis player (1958–2010)

- Native name: 白石正三
- Country (sports): Japan
- Born: 27 January 1958; Osaka, Japan
- Died: 19 January 2010 (aged 51)
- Plays: Right-handed
- Prize money: $15,703

Singles
- Career record: 1–12 (ATP Tour)
- Highest ranking: No. 326 (9 July 1984)

Grand Slam singles results
- Wimbledon: Q2 (1984)

Doubles
- Career record: 1–5 (ATP Tour)
- Highest ranking: No. 416 (11 May 1987)

Shozo Shiraishi (27 January 1958 – 19 January 2010) was a Japanese professional tennis player.

Shiraishi, who was born in Osaka, played in professional tournaments through the 1980s, reaching a career best ranking of 326 in the world. His best performance at Grand Prix level came at Maui in 1983, where he made it into the second round, with a win over former Wimbledon semi-finalist Pat DuPré. He featured himself at Wimbledon in the 1984 qualifying draw, from which he was eliminated by Boris Becker.

Between 1984 and 1987, Shiraishi represented the Japan Davis Cup team and had a 6/7 record, all in singles rubbers. In 1985 he played in two World Group ties and lost all of his matches, but took a set off both Aaron Krickstein of the United States and Spain's Sergio Casal.

In 1986 he defeated Soichi Nakamura to win the singles title at the All Japan Tennis Championships.

== See also ==
- List of Japan Davis Cup team representatives
