= Ma Keqin =

Chinese tennis player

- Full name: Ma Keqin
- Country (sports): China
- Born: 24 February 1962 (age 63); Hubei, China
- Height: 185 cm (6 ft 1 in)

Singles
- Highest ranking: No. 799 (28 July 1986)

Doubles
- Career record: 1–2
- Highest ranking: No. 347 (17 June 1985)

Ma Keqin (born 24 February 1962) is a former professional tennis player from China.

== Biography ==
Ma played for the China Davis Cup team in a total of 10 ties in the 1980s.

His two appearances on the Grand Prix circuit both came in doubles, at the 1984 Japan Open and 1987 Livingston Open, making the round of 16 in the former.

He often partnered with countryman Liu Shuhua in international competition. As a pairing they won two Asian Games medals and competed together at the 1988 Summer Olympics.
