= Song Dong-wook =

South Korean tennis player

Personal information
- Nationality: South Korean
- Born: August 20, 1962 (age 63)

Korean name
- Hangul: 송동욱
- RR: Song Donguk
- MR: Song Tonguk
Medal record
Men's Tennis
Representing South Korea
Asian Games
Gold medal – first place	1986 Seoul	Team
Silver medal – second place	1982 New Delhi	Doubles

Song Dong-wook (born August 20, 1962 in Seoul) is a former tennis player from South Korea, who represented his native country at the 1988 Summer Olympics in Seoul. There he was defeated in the first round by America's eventual runner up Tim Mayotte. The right-hander reached his highest singles ATP-ranking on April 27, 1987, when he became the number 352 of the world.
