= Panomkorn Pladchurnil =

Thai tennis player

- Country (sports): Thailand
- Born: 16 June 1962 (age 63)

Singles
- Career record: 7–11 (ATP Tour & Davis Cup)
- Highest ranking: No. 599 (12 Nov 1984)

Doubles
- Career record: 10–4 (ATP Tour & Davis Cup)
- Highest ranking: No. 600 (30 Jul 1984)
Medal record
Southeast Asian Games
Gold medal – first place	1981 Manila	Men's singles
Gold medal – first place	1983 Singapore	Men's doubles
Gold medal – first place	1989 Kuala Lumpur	Men's team
Silver medal – second place	1985 Bangkok	Men's singles
Silver medal – second place	1987 Jakarta	Men's doubles
Bronze medal – third place	1979 Jakarta	Men's doubles
Bronze medal – third place	1983 Singapore	Men's team
Bronze medal – third place	1985 Bangkok	Men's doubles
Bronze medal – third place	1985 Bangkok	Men's team
Bronze medal – third place	1987 Jakarta	Men's team

Panomkorn Pladchurnil (born 16 June 1962) is a Thai former professional tennis player.

A regular member of Thailand's Davis Cup team of the 1980s, Pladchurnil featured in a total of 14 ties, for seven singles and nine doubles wins. He was the men's singles champion at the 1981 Southeast Asian Games.

Pladchurnil and swimmer Ratchaneewan Bulakul were chosen to light the flame in the opening ceremony of the 1978 Asian Games in Bangkok, as representatives of Thailand's young sportspeople.
