= Raymond Suarez =

Filipino tennis player (born 1963)

- Country (sports): Philippines
- Born: 23 January 1963 (age 63)

Singles
- Career record: 2–2 (Davis Cup)
- Highest ranking: No. 721 (13 Jun 1988)

Grand Slam singles results
- Australian Open: Q2 (1989)

Doubles
- Career record: 6–4 (Davis Cup)
- Highest ranking: No. 654 (12 Mar 1990)
Medal record
Southeast Asian Games
| Silver medal – second place | 1985 Bangkok | Men's team |
| Silver medal – second place | 1987 Jakarta | Men's team |
| Bronze medal – third place | 1987 Jakarta | Mixed doubles |

Raymond Suarez (born 23 January 1963) is a Filipino former professional tennis player.

As a Davis Cup player for the Philippines in the 1980s, Suarez had a 8–6 overall record. His 1988 five-set win over Japan's Toshihisa Tsuchihashi, in the fifth rubber, gave his side a rare victory in tie against the East Asian country.

Suarez took part in qualifying draws for the 1988 Summer Olympics and 1989 Australian Open.

Both of his sons, Justin and Stefan, have played collegiate tennis for Villanova University.
