= Tsuyoshi Fukui =

Japanese tennis player (born 1957)

- Country (sports): Japan
- Born: 22 June 1957 (age 68); Moji, Fukuoka Prefecture
- Height: 5 ft 7 in (170 cm)
- Plays: Right-handed
- Prize money: $34,083

Singles
- Career record: 13–33
- Highest ranking: No. 177 (3 January 1983)

Doubles
- Career record: 6–11
- Highest ranking: No. 280 (4 January 1981)

Grand Slam doubles results
- French Open: 2R (1980)

Tsuyoshi Fukui (福井 烈, Fukui Tsuyoshi; born 22 June 1957) is a retired tour and Japan Davis Cup team tennis player. Fukui holds the record for the most singles win for the Japanese in Davis Cup, with 26. On tour, he won two Challenger tennis events in singles and earned a career-high singles ranking of World No. 177, in January 1983.

== Circuit career ==
Fukui won the 1983 Tokyo Challenger and 1985 Nagoya Challenger. His best results in a Grand Prix tennis event was reaching the third round of the 1980 Tokyo Outdoor (now the Rakuten Japan Open Tennis Championships). The only Grand Prix events he ever played in the main draw of were the Tokyo Outdoor, Tokyo Indoor, and once in each the Taipei Grand Prix and Hong Kong Grand Prix. The Japan No. 1 for much of the late 1970s and early 1980s, Fukui only defeated a non-Japanese opponent four times (Haroon Ismail, Bruce Kleege, Kim Warwick, Mike Estep, Mark Wooldridge, and Jon Levine) in compiling a career singles win-lose record of 10 wins, 26 losses for Grand Prix events.

Fukui lost to Tony Roche at the 1978 Tokyo Outdoor 7–5, 4–6, 1–6; Ilie Năstase at the 1978 Tokyo Indoor 1–6, 4–6; Yannick Noah at the 1979 Tokyo Indoor 2–6, 5–7; Björn Borg at the 1980 Tokyo Indoor 2–6, 2–6; Eliot Teltscher at the 1981 Tokyo Outdoor 1–6, 2–6; John McEnroe at the 1981 Tokyo Indoor 3–6, 2–6; Miloslav Mečíř at the 1987 Tokyo Outdoor 5–7, 1–6; and Stefan Edberg at the 1987 Tokyo Indoor 5–7, 2–6. His best win was the one over Kim Warwick, a top 50 player, at the 1982 Seiko Hong Kong Classic, 7–5, 1–6, 7–6.

In doubles, Fukui competed in one Grand Slam event main draw, the 1980 French Open. He and partner Peter Holl defeated Jean Luc Cotard and Thierry Tulasne in the first round but lost their next match to Heinz Günthardt and Pavel Složil. His best showing in the Grand Prix tourney was reaching the third round of the 1979 Tokyo Outdoor, partnering Davis Cup teammate Jun Kamiwazumi. He won no doubles titles on tour and earned a career-high ranking of World No. 355, in July 1985.

Domestically, Fukui was singles champion of the All Japan Tennis Championships a record seven times (1977, 1978, 1979, 1981, 1983, 1985, and 1988). He was runner-up in 1989, at age 32, and doubles champion once, in 1980 and partnering Kamiwazumi.

Fukui resided in Tokyo when on the pro tour.
