= Hitoshi Shirato =

Japanese tennis player (born 1958)

- Native name: 白戸仁
- Country (sports): Japan
- Born: 19 October 1958 (age 66)
- Plays: Right-handed
- Prize money: $24,337

Singles
- Career record: 2–7
- Highest ranking: No. 337 (3 March 1986)

Grand Slam singles results
- Australian Open: Q3 (1983)
- Wimbledon: Q2 (1986, 1987)

Doubles
- Career record: 3–15
- Highest ranking: No. 236 (9 December 1985)

Grand Slam doubles results
- Australian Open: 1R (1988, 1989)
- Wimbledon: 1R (1984)

Grand Slam mixed doubles results
- Wimbledon: 3R (1986)

Hitoshi Shirato (born 19 October 1958) is a Japanese former professional tennis player.

== Biography ==
Born in 1958, Shirato was a leading Japanese player of the 1980s.

Shirato, a right-handed player, featured in a total of 10 Davis Cup ties for Japan. He won three Davis Cup singles rubbers, including one against India's Ramesh Krishnan in 1983.

During his career he competed in the doubles main draw at both the Australian Open and Wimbledon. His best performance was a third round appearance in the mixed doubles at the 1986 Wimbledon Championships.

== See also ==
- List of Japan Davis Cup team representatives
