= 1995 Indonesia Open – Singles =

Singles
- 1995 Indonesia Open
- 1994 Champion: (United States) Michael Chang

Final
- Champion: (Netherlands) Paul Haarhuis
- Runner-up: (Czech Republic) Radomír Vašek
- Score: 6–3, 6–2

Details
- Draw: 32
- Seeds: 8

Events
Singles	Doubles
← 1994 ·	Indonesia Open	· 1996 →

The 1995 Indonesia Open – Singles was an event of the 1995 Indonesia Open men's tennis tournament which held from 9 January until 15 January 1995 at the Gelora Senayan Stadium in Jakarta, Indonesia. The tournament was part of World Series of the 1995 ATP Tour. The singles draw consisted of 32 players and eight of them were seeded.

Michael Chang was the defending champion but he did not compete in this edition. First-seeded Paul Haarhuis won the singles title after a 7–5, 7–5 victory in the final against unseeded Radomír Vašek.

== Seeds ==
1. (Withdrew)
2. (Netherlands) Paul Haarhuis (champion)
3. (Austria) Gilbert Schaller (quarterfinals)
4. (Germany) Markus Zoecke (second round)
5. (Czech Republic) David Rikl (first round)
6. (Morocco) Karim Alami (first round)
7. (France) Jean-Philippe Fleurian (first round)
8. (Russia) Andrei Olhovskiy (first round)

== Draw ==
=== Key ===
- Q = Qualifier
- WC = Wild card
- LL = Lucky loser
- Alt = Alternate
- SE = Special exempt
- PR = Protected ranking
- ITF = ITF entry
- JE = Junior exempt
- w/o = Walkover
- r = Retired
- d = Defaulted
- SR = Special ranking

=== Finals ===
Semifinals
LL	(Haiti) Ronald Agénor	6	4	2
(Czech Republic) Radomír Vašek	2	6	6
(Denmark) Kenneth Carlsen	6	3	3
2	(Netherlands) Paul Haarhuis	3	6	6

Final
(Czech Republic) Radomír Vašek	5	5
2	(Netherlands) Paul Haarhuis	7	7

=== Top half ===
First Round
LL	(Haiti) Ronald Agénor	7	6
(Belgium) Filip Dewulf	5	1
(Italy) Stefano Pescosolido	6	7
(Sweden) Lars Jonsson	0	5
(France) Guillaume Raoux	6	6
(India) Leander Paes	2	2
Q	(Belgium) Xavier Daufresne	6	7
8	(Russia) Andrei Olhovskiy	3	5
4	(Germany) Markus Zoecke	6	6
WC	(Chinese Taipei) Lin Bing-chao	1	2
(United Kingdom) Mark Petchey	6	6
Q	(Morocco) Hicham Arazi	1	3
(France) Gérard Solvès	6	2
(Germany) Alexander Mronz	4	1^{r}
(Czech Republic) Radomír Vašek	6	6
6	(Morocco) Karim Alami	1	4

Second Round
LL	(Haiti) Ronald Agénor	6	6
(Italy) Stefano Pescosolido	1	3
(France) Guillaume Raoux	6	6
Q	(Belgium) Xavier Daufresne	1	4
4	(Germany) Markus Zoecke	5	2
(United Kingdom) Mark Petchey	7	6
(France) Gérard Solvès	1	6^{1}
(Czech Republic) Radomír Vašek	6	7^{7}

Quarterfinals
LL	(Haiti) Ronald Agénor	6	6
(France) Guillaume Raoux	4	4
(United Kingdom) Mark Petchey	3	6	4
(Czech Republic) Radomír Vašek	6	4	6

Semifinals
LL	(Haiti) Ronald Agénor	6	4	2
(Czech Republic) Radomír Vašek	2	6	6

=== Bottom half ===
First Round
5	(Czech Republic) David Rikl	6	2	0
Q	(Netherlands) Sander Groen	1	6	6
(Denmark) Kenneth Carlsen	6	6
(South Africa) David Adams	2	3
WC	(Indonesia) Donny Susetyo	1	3
(Venezuela) Nicolás Pereira	6	6
(Japan) Shuzo Matsuoka	6	3	4
3	(Austria) Gilbert Schaller	4	6	6
7	(France) Jean-Philippe Fleurian	6	6^{4}	6^{4}
(France) Rodolphe Gilbert	3	7^{7}	7^{7}
(United Kingdom) Greg Rusedski	7^{7}	6
WC	(Indonesia) Suwandi	6^{4}	2
Q	(Indonesia) Bonit Wiryawan	4	1
(Germany) Martin Sinner	6	6
(Morocco) Younes El Aynaoui	3	2
2	(Netherlands) Paul Haarhuis	6	6

Second Round
Q	(Netherlands) Sander Groen
(Denmark) Kenneth Carlsen	w/o
(Venezuela) Nicolás Pereira	6^{3}	6	3
3	(Austria) Gilbert Schaller	7^{7}	3	6
(France) Rodolphe Gilbert	3	6	4
(United Kingdom) Greg Rusedski	6	4	6
(Germany) Martin Sinner	4	4
2	(Netherlands) Paul Haarhuis	6	6

Quarterfinals
(Denmark) Kenneth Carlsen	6	7^{7}
3	(Austria) Gilbert Schaller	4	6^{1}
(United Kingdom) Greg Rusedski	7	3	1
2	(Netherlands) Paul Haarhuis	5	6	6

Semifinals
(Denmark) Kenneth Carlsen	6	3	3
2	(Netherlands) Paul Haarhuis	3	6	6
