= 1994 Indonesia Open – Singles =

Singles
- 1994 Indonesia Open

Final
- Champion: (United States) Michael Chang
- Runner-up: (Czech Republic) David Rikl
- Score: 6–3, 6–3

Details
- Draw: 32 (3WC/3Q/2LL)
- Seeds: 8

Events
Singles	Doubles
- Jakarta Open

Michael Chang successfully defended his title by defeating David Rikl 6–3, 6–3 in the final.

== Seeds ==
1. (United States) Michael Chang (champion)
2. (Netherlands) Paul Haarhuis (first round)
3. (Morocco) Younes El Aynaoui (semifinals)
4. (Italy) Stefano Pescosolido (first round)
5. (Netherlands) Jacco Eltingh (first round)
6. (Russia) Andrei Olhovskiy (second round)
7. (Italy) Renzo Furlan (first round)
8. (France) Stéphane Simian (second round)

== Draw ==
Key

- Q = Qualifier
- WC = Wild card
- LL = Lucky loser
- Alt = Alternate
- ITF = ITF entry
- PR = Protected ranking
- SR = Special ranking
- SE = Special exempt
- JE = Junior exempt
- JR = Junior Accelerator Programme entrant
- CO = College Accelerator Programme entrant
- NG = Next Gen Accelerator Program entrant
- w/o = Walkover
- r = Retired
- d = Defaulted

=== Finals ===
Semifinals
1	(United States) Michael Chang	6	6
3	(Morocco) Younes El Aynaoui	3	3
(Venezuela) Maurice Ruah	6	5	3
(Czech Republic) David Rikl	4	7	6

Final
1	(United States) Michael Chang	6	6
(Czech Republic) David Rikl	3	3

=== Top half ===
First round
1	(United States) M Chang	6	6
WC	(Indonesia) B Wiryawan	1	0
LL	(France) S Hette	3	1
Q	(Argentina) C Charpentier	6	6
(France) O Delaître	1	6	2
(United States) R Weiss	6	3	6
(Sweden) J Björkman	3	7	6
7	(Italy) R Furlan	6	5	2
3	(Morocco) Y El Aynaoui	6	4	6
WC	(Indonesia) Suwandi	0	6	4
(United States) S Bryan	6	6
(Austria) A Antonitsch	4	1
(Bulgaria) M Melev	5	0
WC	(Chinese Taipei) B-c Lin	7	6
(United States) R Matuszewski	6	6^{4}	2
6	(Russia) A Olhovskiy	2	7^{7}	6

Second round
1	(United States) M Chang	6	6
Q	(Argentina) C Charpentier	3	3
(United States) R Weiss	6	6
(Sweden) J Björkman	3	3
3	(Morocco) Y El Aynaoui	6	1
(United States) S Bryan	1	0^{r}
WC	(Chinese Taipei) B-c Lin	7^{7}	6
6	(Russia) A Olhovskiy	6^{4}	4

Quarterfinals
1	(United States) M Chang	w/o
(United States) R Weiss
3	(Morocco) Y El Aynaoui	6	6
WC	(Chinese Taipei) B-c Lin	3	4

Semifinals
1	(United States) M Chang	6	6
3	(Morocco) Y El Aynaoui	3	3

=== Bottom half ===
First round
5	(Netherlands) J Eltingh	7^{7}	6^{1}	2
(Italy) C Caratti	6^{4}	7^{7}	6
(United States) T Ho	4^{r}
(Venezuela) M Ruah	4
Q	(Morocco) K Alami	7	6
LL	(France) A Andriolo	5	2
(Germany) CU Steeb	6	2	6
4	(Italy) S Pescosolido	1	6	2
8	(France) S Simian	7^{7}	6
(Australia) N Borwick	6^{3}	4
(Argentina) D Orsanic	2	1
(France) JP Fleurian	6	6
(Czech Republic) D Rikl	0	4
Q	(Netherlands) M Oosting	6	0^{r}
(Sweden) L Jönsson	6	6
2	(Netherlands) P Haarhuis	1	1

Second round
(Italy) C Caratti	7	6^{1}	0
(Venezuela) M Ruah	5	7^{7}	6
Q	(Morocco) K Alami	4
(Germany) CU Steeb	1^{r}
8	(France) S Simian	3	0
(France) JP Fleurian	6	6
(Czech Republic) D Rikl	4
(Sweden) L Jönsson	3^{r}

Quarterfinals
(Venezuela) M Ruah	6	7^{7}
Q	(Morocco) K Alami	4	6^{3}
(France) JP Fleurian	2	5
(Czech Republic) D Rikl	6	7

Semifinals
(Venezuela) M Ruah	6	5	3
(Czech Republic) D Rikl	4	7	6
