= 1995 Indonesia Open =

- Date: 9–15 January
- Edition: 3rd
- Category: World Series
- Draw: 32S / 16D
- Prize money: $303,000
- Surface: Hard / outdoor
- Location: Jakarta, Indonesia
- Venue: Gelora Senayan Stadium

Champions

Singles
- (Netherlands) Paul Haarhuis

Doubles
- (South Africa) David Adams / (Russia) Andrei Olhovskiy
- Jakarta Open

The 1995 Indonesia Open was a men's tennis tournament played on outdoor hard courts at the Gelora Senayan Stadium in Jakarta in Indonesia that was part of the World Series of the 1995 ATP Tour. It was the third edition of the tournament since its reboot in 1993 and ran from 9 January through 15 January 1995. Second-seeded Paul Haarhuis won the singles title.

== Finals ==
=== Singles ===
(Netherlands) Paul Haarhuis defeated (Czech Republic) Radomír Vašek 7–5, 7–5

- It was Haarhuis's only singles title of his career.

=== Doubles ===
(South Africa) David Adams / (Russia) Andrei Olhovskiy defeated (Haiti) Ronald Agénor / (Japan) Shuzo Matsuoka 7–5, 6–3

- It was Adams' 1st doubles title of the year and the 7th of his career. It was Olhovskiy's 1st doubles title of the year and the 6th of his career.
