= 1995 Indonesia Open – Doubles =

Doubles
- 1995 Indonesia Open
- 1994 Champions: (Sweden) Jonas Björkman (Australia) Neil Borwick

Final
- Champions: (South Africa) David Adams (Russia) Andrei Olhovskiy
- Runners-up: (Haiti) Ronald Agénor (Japan) Shuzo Matsuoka
- Score: 7–5, 6–3

Details
- Draw: 16
- Seeds: 4

Events
Singles	Doubles
← 1994 ·	Indonesia Open	· 1996 →

The 1995 Indonesia Open – Doubles was an event of the 1995 Indonesia Open men's tennis tournament which held from 9 January until 15 January 1995 at the Gelora Senayan Stadium in Jakarta, Indonesia. The tournament was part of World Series of the 1995 ATP Tour. The doubles draw consisted of 16 teams and four of them were seeded.

Jonas Björkman and Neil Borwick were the defending champions but did not compete in this edition.

The first-seeded team of David Adams and Andrei Olhovskiy won the doubles title after a 7–5, 6–3 victory in the final against the unseeded team of Ronald Agénor and Shuzo Matsuoka.

== Seeds ==
1. (South Africa) David Adams / (Russia) Andrei Olhovskiy (champions)
2. (South Africa) Lan Bale / (South Africa) John-Laffnie de Jager (semifinals)
3. (United States) Shelby Cannon / (United States) Jim Pugh (first round)
4. (Netherlands) Sander Groen / (Netherlands) Paul Haarhuis (withdrew)

== Draw ==
=== Key ===
- Q = Qualifier
- WC = Wild card
- LL = Lucky loser
- Alt = Alternate
- SE = Special exempt
- PR = Protected ranking
- ITF = ITF entry
- JE = Junior exempt
- w/o = Walkover
- r = Retired
- d = Defaulted
- SR = Special ranking

First Round
1	(South Africa) David Adams (Russia) Andrei Olhovskiy	4	7	6
(Belgium) Filip Dewulf (Belgium) Libor Pimek	6	5	2
(France) Guillaume Raoux (United Kingdom) Greg Rusedski	7	6
(Denmark) Kenneth Carlsen (Czech Republic) Radomír Vašek	5	3
3	(United States) Shelby Cannon (United States) Jim Pugh	6	4	4
(Indonesia) Suwandi (Indonesia) Bonit Wiryawan	3	6	6
(Indonesia) Champy Halim (Indonesia) Andrian Raturandang	1	2
(India) Mahesh Bhupathi (Indonesia) Sulistyo Wibowo	6	6
(South Africa) Stefan Kruger (United Kingdom) Mark Petchey	6	7
(Indonesia) Sebastian Da Costa (Indonesia) Donny Susetyo	2	6
(Haiti) Ronald Agénor (Japan) Shuzo Matsuoka	w/o
4	(Netherlands) Sander Groen (Netherlands) Paul Haarhuis
(Venezuela) Nicolás Pereira (Italy) Stefano Pescosolido	7	1	1
(France) Jean-Philippe Fleurian (France) Rodolphe Gilbert	6	6	6
(Czech Republic) Vojtěch Flégl (Germany) Martin Sinner	2	7	6
2	(South Africa) Lan Bale (South Africa) John-Laffnie de Jager	6	6	7

Quarterfinals
1	(South Africa) David Adams (Russia) Andrei Olhovskiy	6	5	7
(France) Guillaume Raoux (United Kingdom) Greg Rusedski	4	7	6
(Indonesia) Suwandi (Indonesia) Bonit Wiryawan	3	6	6
(India) Mahesh Bhupathi (Indonesia) Sulistyo Wibowo	6	1	4
(South Africa) Stefan Kruger (United Kingdom) Mark Petchey	4	4
(Haiti) Ronald Agénor (Japan) Shuzo Matsuoka	6	6
(France) Jean-Philippe Fleurian (France) Rodolphe Gilbert	7	4	4
2	(South Africa) Lan Bale (South Africa) John-Laffnie de Jager	6	6	6

Semifinals
1	(South Africa) David Adams (Russia) Andrei Olhovskiy	7	6
(Indonesia) Suwandi (Indonesia) Bonit Wiryawan	5	3
(Haiti) Ronald Agénor (Japan) Shuzo Matsuoka	6	6
2	(South Africa) Lan Bale (South Africa) John-Laffnie de Jager	2	4

Final
1	(South Africa) David Adams (Russia) Andrei Olhovskiy	7	6
(Haiti) Ronald Agénor (Japan) Shuzo Matsuoka	5	3
