= 1994 Indonesia Open – Doubles =

Doubles
- 1994 Indonesia Open

Final
- Champions: (Sweden) Jonas Björkman (Australia) Neil Borwick
- Runners-up: (Mexico) Jorge Lozano (United States) Jim Pugh
- Score: 6–4, 6–1

Details
- Draw: 16 (2WC/1Q)
- Seeds: 4

Events
Singles	Doubles
- Jakarta Open

Diego Nargiso and Guillaume Raoux were the defending champions, but none competed this year. Nargiso chose to compete at Sydney while Raoux chose to compete at Auckland, both during the same week.

Jonas Björkman and Neil Borwick won the title by defeating Jorge Lozano and Jim Pugh 6–4, 6–1 in the final.

== Seeds ==
1. (Netherlands) Jacco Eltingh / (Netherlands) Paul Haarhuis (semifinals)
2. (Netherlands) Menno Oosting / (Belgium) Libor Pimek (semifinals)
3. (United States) Shelby Cannon / (South Africa) Byron Talbot (first round)
4. (South Africa) John-Laffnie de Jager / (South Africa) Stefan Kruger (first round)

== Draw ==
Key

- Q = Qualifier
- WC = Wild card
- LL = Lucky loser
- Alt = Alternate
- ITF = ITF entry
- PR = Protected ranking
- SR = Special ranking
- SE = Special exempt
- JE = Junior exempt
- JR = Junior Accelerator Programme entrant
- CO = College Accelerator Programme entrant
- NG = Next Gen Accelerator Program entrant
- w/o = Walkover
- r = Retired
- d = Defaulted

=== Draw ===
First round
1	(Netherlands) J Eltingh (Netherlands) P Haarhuis	6	6	6
WC	(Indonesia) Suwandi (Chinese Taipei) B-c Lin	7	3	1
(Italy) C Caratti (Argentina) D Orsanic	5	r
(France) O Delaître (France) JP Fleurian	7
3	(United States) S Cannon (South Africa) B Talbot	3	5
(Sweden) J Björkman (Australia) N Borwick	6	7
Q	(Indonesia) S Wibowo (Indonesia) B Wiryawan	2	6	6
(United States) R Benson (United States) J Yancey	6	4	3
WC	(Indonesia) D Susetyo (Indonesia) T Tandjung	5	2
(United States) T Ho (Australia) J Ireland	7	6
(Mexico) J Lozano (United States) J Pugh	3	6	6
4	(South Africa) JL de Jager (South Africa) S Kruger	6	3	4
(Indonesia) Champy Halim (Indonesia) A Soemarno	1	6
(Russia) A Olhovskiy (Germany) CU Steeb	6	7
(Venezuela) M Ruah (Italy) L Tieleman	3	2
2	(Netherlands) M Oosting (Belgium) L Pimek	6	6

Quarterfinals
1	(Netherlands) J Eltingh (Netherlands) P Haarhuis	6	6
(France) O Delaître (France) JP Fleurian	2	2
(Sweden) J Björkman (Australia) N Borwick	6	6
Q	(Indonesia) S Wibowo (Indonesia) B Wiryawan	4	3
(United States) T Ho (Australia) J Ireland	3	3
(Mexico) J Lozano (United States) J Pugh	6	6
(Russia) A Olhovskiy (Germany) CU Steeb	4	4
2	(Netherlands) M Oosting (Belgium) L Pimek	6	6

Semifinals
1	(Netherlands) J Eltingh (Netherlands) P Haarhuis	4	5
(Sweden) J Björkman (Australia) N Borwick	6	7
(Mexico) J Lozano (United States) J Pugh	6	7
2	(Netherlands) M Oosting (Belgium) L Pimek	3	6

Final
(Sweden) J Björkman (Australia) N Borwick	6	6
(Mexico) J Lozano (United States) J Pugh	4	1
