= 1996 Indonesia Open =

- Date: 8–14 January
- Edition: 4th
- Category: World Series
- Draw: 32S / 16D
- Prize money: $303,000
- Surface: Hard / outdoor
- Location: Jakarta, Indonesia
- Venue: Gelora Senayan Stadium

Champions

Singles
- (Netherlands) Sjeng Schalken

Doubles
- (United States) Rick Leach / (United States) Scott Melville
- Jakarta Open

The 1996 Indonesia Open was a men's tennis tournament played on outdoor hard courts at the Gelora Senayan Stadium in Jakarta in Indonesia and was part of the World Series of the 1996 ATP Tour. It was the fourth edition of the tournament since its reboot in 1993 and ran from 8 January through 14 January 1996. Fifth-seeded Sjeng Schalken won the singles title.

== Finals ==
=== Singles ===
(Netherlands) Sjeng Schalken defeated (Morocco) Younes El Aynaoui 6–3, 6–2

- It was Schalken's only singles title of the year and the 2nd of his career.

=== Doubles ===
(United States) Rick Leach / (United States) Scott Melville defeated (United States) Kent Kinnear / (United States) Dave Randall 6–1, 2–6, 6–1

- It was Leach's 1st title of the year and the 32nd of his career. It was Melville's 1st title of the year and the 8th of his career.
