= 1996 Indonesia Open – Singles =

Singles
- 1996 Indonesia Open
- 1995 Champion: (Netherlands) Paul Haarhuis

Final
- Champion: (Netherlands) Sjeng Schalken
- Runner-up: (Morocco) Younes El Aynaoui
- Score: 6–3, 6–2

Details
- Draw: 32
- Seeds: 8

Events
Singles	Doubles
← 1995 ·	Indonesia Open

The 1996 Indonesia Open – Singles was an event of the 1996 Indonesia Open men's tennis tournament which held from 8 January until 14 January 1996 at the Gelora Senayan Stadium in Jakarta, Indonesia. The tournament was part of World Series of the 1996 ATP Tour. The singles draw consisted of 32 players and eight of them were seeded.

Paul Haarhuis was the defending champion but lost in the semifinals to Younes El Aynaoui. Unseeded Sjeng Schalken won the singles title after 6–3, 6–2 victory in the final against unseeded El Aynaoui.

== Seeds ==
A champion seed is indicated in bold text while text in italics indicates the round in which that seed was eliminated.

1. (Netherlands) Paul Haarhuis (semifinals)
2. (Austria) Gilbert Schaller (quarterfinals)
3. (Spain) Javier Sánchez (first round)
4. (Netherlands) Jacco Eltingh (second round)
5. (Netherlands) **Sjeng Schalken (champion)**
6. (Morocco) Karim Alami (first round)
7. (France) Guillaume Raoux (quarterfinals)
8. (Sweden) Jan Apell (first round)

== Draw ==
=== Key ===
- Q = Qualifier
- WC = Wild card
- LL = Lucky loser
- Alt = Alternate
- SE = Special exempt
- PR = Protected ranking
- ITF = ITF entry
- JE = Junior exempt
- w/o = Walkover
- r = Retired
- d = Defaulted
- SR = Special ranking

First round
1	(Netherlands) **P Haarhuis**	**6**	**6**
(Belgium) K Goossens	2	1
WC	(Indonesia) A Raturandang	2	4
(United Kingdom) **C Wilkinson**	**6**	**6**
WC	(Indonesia) S Wibowo	**6**	3	0
Q	(Austria) **H Wiltschnig**	3	**6**	**6**
(France) L Roux	6^{7}	1
7	(France) **G Raoux**	**7^{9}**	**6**
4	(Netherlands) **J Eltingh**	**6**	**6**
Q	(France) F Vitoux	1	2
Q	(Japan) H Kaneko	0	4
(Spain) **E Sánchez**	**6**	**6**
Q	(Netherlands) S Groen	5	3
(Russia) **A Chesnokov**	**7**	**6**
(Morocco) **Y El Aynaoui**	**7^{7}**	**6**
6	(Morocco) K Alami	6^{5}	2
5	(Netherlands) **S Schalken**	**6**	6^{7}	**6**
(Belgium) J van Herck	4	**7^{9}**	0
(Ecuador) **N Lapentti**	**6**	**6**
(Denmark) F Fetterlein	3	1
WC	(Indonesia) S Suwandi	**6**	6^{9}	5
(Colombia) **M Hadad**	2	**7^{11}**	**7**
(Sweden) **M Tillström**	**6**	**7^{7}**
3	(Spain) J Sánchez	4	6^{4}
8	(Sweden) J Apell	2	**6**	4
(Uzbekistan) **O Ogorodov**	**6**	3	**6**
(France) F Santoro	6^{4}	1
(United States) **M Joyce**	**7^{7}**	**6**
(Belgium) D Norman	6^{3}	6^{1}
(Hungary) **S Noszály**	**7^{7}**	**7^{7}**
(Russia) A Olhovskiy	3	**7**	4
2	(Austria) **G Schaller**	**6**	5	**6**

Second round
1	(Netherlands) **P Haarhuis**	**6**	3
(United Kingdom) C Wilkinson	1	0^{r}
Q	(Austria) H Wiltschnig	3	1
7	(France) **G Raoux**	**6**	**6**
4	(Netherlands) J Eltingh	6^{5}	5
(Spain) **E Sánchez**	**7^{7}**	**7**
(Russia) A Chesnokov	6^{6}	2
(Morocco) **Y El Aynaoui**	**7^{8}**	**6**
5	(Netherlands) **S Schalken**	**6**	4	**6**
(Ecuador) N Lapentti	3	**6**	1
(Colombia) M Hadad	**7^{8}**	3	6^{1}
(Sweden) **M Tillström**	6^{6}	**6**	**7^{7}**
(Uzbekistan) O Ogorodov	5	1^{r}
(United States) **M Joyce**	**7**	4
(Hungary) S Noszály	**6**	6^{1}	1
2	(Austria) **G Schaller**	3	**7^{7}**	**6**

Quarterfinals
1	(Netherlands) **P Haarhuis**	**7^{7}**	4	**7^{7}**
7	(France) G Raoux	6^{3}	**6**	6^{3}
(Spain) E Sánchez	0	1
(Morocco) **Y El Aynaoui**	**6**	**6**
5	(Netherlands) **S Schalken**	5	**6**	**6**
(Sweden) M Tillström	**7**	2	4
(United States) **M Joyce**	**6**	**6**
2	(Austria) G Schaller	3	2

Semifinals
1	(Netherlands) P Haarhuis	3	**7^{7}**	3
(Morocco) **Y El Aynaoui**	**6**	6^{4}	**6**
5	(Netherlands) **S Schalken**	3	**6**	**6**
(United States) M Joyce	**6**	3	3

Final
(Morocco) Younes El Aynaoui	3	2
5	(Netherlands) **Sjeng Schalken**	**6**	**6**
