= 2002 Dubai Tennis Championships – Doubles =

Doubles
- 2002 Dubai Tennis Championships and the Dubai Duty Free Women's Open

Final
- Champions: (The Bahamas) Mark Knowles (Canada) Daniel Nestor
- Runners-up: (Australia) Joshua Eagle (Australia) Sandon Stolle
- Score: 3–6, 6–3, [13–11]

Details
- Draw: 16
- Seeds: 4

Events
Singles	men	women
Doubles	men	women
- Dubai Tennis Championships Dubai Duty Free Women's Open

Joshua Eagle and Sandon Stolle were the defending champions but lost in the final 3–6, 6–3, [13–11] against Mark Knowles and Daniel Nestor.

== Seeds ==
1. (The Bahamas) Mark Knowles / (Canada) Daniel Nestor (champions)
2. (Australia) Joshua Eagle / (Australia) Sandon Stolle (final)
3. (Czech Republic) Petr Pála / (Czech Republic) Pavel Vízner (first round)
4. (Australia) Michael Hill / (United States) Jeff Tarango (first round)

== Draw ==
Key

- Q = Qualifier
- WC = Wild card
- LL = Lucky loser
- Alt = Alternate
- ITF = ITF entry
- PR = Protected ranking
- SR = Special ranking
- SE = Special exempt
- JE = Junior exempt
- JR = Junior Accelerator Programme entrant
- CO = College Accelerator Programme entrant
- NG = Next Gen Accelerator Program entrant
- w/o = Walkover
- r = Retired
- d = Defaulted

First round
1	(The Bahamas) M Knowles (Canada) D Nestor	6	7^{7}
(Sweden) T Johansson (Germany) N Kiefer	2	6^{2}
(Germany) K Braasch (Russia) A Olhovskiy	6	6
WC	(United Arab Emirates) M Al Nuaimi (United Arab Emirates) O Alawadhi	3	0
3	(Czech Republic) P Pála (Czech Republic) P Vízner	3	4
(Czech Republic) T Cibulec (Czech Republic) J Novák	6	6
(Spain) J C Ferrero (Spain) T Robredo	5	4
(France) J Boutter (Netherlands) S Schalken	7	6
(Czech Republic) R Štěpánek (Czech Republic) C Suk	6	6
(Slovakia) D Hrbatý (Russia) Y Kafelnikov	2	3
(France) A Clément (France) F Santoro	3	6	[10]
4	(Australia) M Hill (United States) J Tarango	6	3	[7]
WC	(Netherlands) S Groen (Croatia) G Ivanišević	3	3^{r}
(Switzerland) R Federer (Belarus) M Mirnyi	6	2
WC	(Morocco) Y El Aynaoui (France) C Pioline	3	1
2	(Australia) J Eagle (Australia) S Stolle	6	6

Quarterfinals
1	(The Bahamas) M Knowles (Canada) D Nestor	6^{6}	6	[11]
(Germany) K Braasch (Russia) A Olhovskiy	7^{8}	4	[9]
(Czech Republic) T Cibulec (Czech Republic) J Novák	7^{7}	4	[3]
(France) J Boutter (Netherlands) S Schalken	6^{3}	6	[10]
(Czech Republic) R Štěpánek (Czech Republic) C Suk	4	4
(France) A Clément (France) F Santoro	6	6
(Switzerland) R Federer (Belarus) M Mirnyi	4	4
2	(Australia) J Eagle (Australia) S Stolle	6	6

Semifinals
1	(The Bahamas) M Knowles (Canada) D Nestor	3	6	[10]
(France) J Boutter (Netherlands) S Schalken	6	3	[8]
(France) A Clément (France) F Santoro	3	6	[3]
2	(Australia) J Eagle (Australia) S Stolle	6	3	[10]

Final
1	(The Bahamas) M Knowles (Canada) D Nestor	3	6	[13]
2	(Australia) J Eagle (Australia) S Stolle	6	3	[11]
