= 2002 Dubai Tennis Championships and Duty Free Women's Open =

2002 Dubai Tennis Championships and Dubai Duty Free Women's Open
- Date: February 25 – March 3 (men); February 18 – February 23 (women)
- Edition: 9th (men) / 2nd (women)
- Surface: Hard / outdoor
- Location: Dubai, United Arab Emirates
- Venue: Aviation Club Tennis Centre

Champions

Men's singles
- (France) Fabrice Santoro

Women's singles
- (France) Amélie Mauresmo

Men's doubles
- (The Bahamas) Mark Knowles / (Canada) Daniel Nestor

Women's doubles
- (Germany) Barbara Rittner / (Venezuela) María Vento-Kabchi
- Dubai Tennis Championships Dubai Duty Free Women's Open

The 2002 Dubai Tennis Championships and Dubai Duty Free Women's Open were tennis tournaments played on outdoor hard courts at the Aviation Club Tennis Centre in Dubai in the United Arab Emirates that were part of the International Series Gold of the 2002 ATP Tour and of Tier II of the 2002 WTA Tour. The men's tournament was held from February 25 through March 3, 2002 while the women's tournament was held from February 18 through February 23, 2002. Fabrice Santoro and Amélie Mauresmo won the singles titles.

== Finals ==
=== Men's singles ===
(France) Fabrice Santoro defeated (Morocco) Younes El Aynaoui 6–4, 3–6, 6–3

- It was Santoro's 1st title of the year and the 12th of his career.

=== Women's singles ===
(France) Amélie Mauresmo defeated (France) Sandrine Testud 6–4, 7–6^{(7–3)}

- It was Mauresmo's 1st title of the year and the 8th of her career.

=== Men's doubles ===
(The Bahamas) Mark Knowles / (Canada) Daniel Nestor defeated (Australia) Joshua Eagle / (Australia) Sandon Stolle 3–6, 6–3, [13–11]

- It was Knowles' 2nd title of the year and the 19th of his career. It was Nestor's 2nd title of the year and the 22nd of his career.

=== Women's doubles ===
(Germany) Barbara Rittner / (Venezuela) María Vento-Kabchi defeated (France) Sandrine Testud / (Italy) Roberta Vinci 6–3, 6–2

- It was Rittner's only title of the year and the 5th of her career. It was Vento-Kabchi's 1st title of the year and the 1st of her career.
