= 2002 Dubai Duty Free Women's Open – Singles =

Singles
- 2002 Dubai Tennis Championships and the Dubai Duty Free Women's Open

Final
- Champion: (France) Amélie Mauresmo
- Runner-up: (France) Sandrine Testud
- Score: 6–4, 7–6^{(7–3)}

Details
- Draw: 28 (2WC/4Q)
- Seeds: 8

Events
Singles	men	women
Doubles	men	women
- Dubai Tennis Championships Dubai Duty Free Women's Open

Martina Hingis was the defending champion, but did not compete this year.

Amélie Mauresmo won the title by defeating Sandrine Testud 6–4, 7–6^{(7–3)} in the final.

== Seeds ==
The first four seeds received a bye into the second round.

1. (United States) Venus Williams (semifinals)
2. (United States) Monica Seles (semifinals)
3. (France) Amélie Mauresmo (champion)
4. (France) Sandrine Testud (final)
5. (Uzbekistan) Iroda Tulyaganova (first round)
6. (Thailand) Tamarine Tanasugarn (quarterfinals)
7. (Spain) Ángeles Montolio (quarterfinals)
8. (Slovakia) Henrieta Nagyová (first round)

== Draw ==
Key

- Q = Qualifier
- WC = Wild card
- LL = Lucky loser
- Alt = Alternate
- ITF = ITF entry
- PR = Protected ranking
- SR = Special ranking
- SE = Special exempt
- JE = Junior exempt
- JR = Junior Accelerator Programme entrant
- CO = College Accelerator Programme entrant
- NG = Next Gen Accelerator Program entrant
- w/o = Walkover
- r = Retired
- d = Defaulted

=== Finals ===
Semifinals
1	(United States) Venus Williams	6	6^{5}	4
4	(France) Sandrine Testud	1	7^{7}	6
3	(France) Amélie Mauresmo	6	6
2	(United States) Monica Seles	4	3

Finals
4	(France) Sandrine Testud	4	6^{3}
3	(France) Amélie Mauresmo	6	7^{7}

=== Top half ===
First round
WC	(Tunisia) S Sfar	7^{7}	2	4
(Russia) A Kournikova	6^{3}	6	6
Q	(Croatia) J Kostanić	7^{7}	6
(Hungary) P Mandula	6^{3}	1
(Russia) A Myskina	6	6
8	(Slovakia) H Nagyová	3	3
(Czech Republic) A Gerši	6	4	5
(Italy) R Grande	0	6	7
(Australia) A Molik	0	7	4
(Russia) T Panova	6	5	6
(Slovakia) M Suchá	6	0	3
6	(Thailand) T Tanasugarn	3	6	6

Second round
1	(United States) V Williams	6	7^{7}
(Russia) A Kournikova	2	6^{3}
Q	(Croatia) J Kostanić	3	2
(Russia) A Myskina	6	6
4	(France) S Testud	4	7	6
(Italy) R Grande	6	5	2
(Russia) T Panova	2	3
6	(Thailand) T Tanasugarn	6	6

Quarterfinals
1	(United States) V Williams	6	3	6
(Russia) A Myskina	0	6	4
4	(France) S Testud	6	6
6	(Thailand) T Tanasugarn	2	0

Semifinals
1	(United States) V Williams	6	6^{5}	4
4	(France) S Testud	1	7^{7}	6

=== Bottom half ===
First round
5	(Uzbekistan) I Tulyaganova	2	2
(Germany) B Rittner	6	6
(Slovenia) T Pisnik	6	6
WC	(Australia) R McQuillan	2	4
(Switzerland) E Gagliardi	6	6
(Australia) N Pratt	4	3
7	(Spain) Á Montolio	6	2	6
Q	(France) C Pin	3	6	2
(Slovakia) J Husárová	6	6
Q	(Indonesia) A Widjaja	1	4
(Belarus) T Poutchek	2	6	4
Q	(Italy) T Garbin	6	3	6

Second round
(Germany) B Rittner	5	4
(Slovenia) T Pisnik	7	6
(Switzerland) E Gagliardi	3	2
3	(France) A Mauresmo	6	6
7	(Spain) Á Montolio	6	6
(Slovakia) J Husárová	3	2
Q	(Italy) T Garbin	2	3
2	(United States) M Seles	6	6

Quarterfinals
(Slovenia) T Pisnik	1	2
3	(France) A Mauresmo	6	6
7	(Spain) Á Montolio	0	2
2	(United States) M Seles	6	6

Semifinals
3	(France) A Mauresmo	6	6
2	(United States) M Seles	4	3

== Qualifying ==
=== Qualifying seeds ===
1. (Germany) Jana Kandarr (first round)
2. (Slovenia) Maja Matevžič (first round)
3. (Sweden) Åsa Svensson (qualifying competition)
4. (Italy) Tathiana Garbin (qualified)
5. (Croatia) Jelena Kostanić (qualified)
6. (Netherlands) Kristie Boogert (first round)
7. (Czech Republic) Sandra Kleinová (second round)
8. (Czech Republic) Lenka Němečková (first round)

=== Qualifiers ===
1. (France) Camille Pin
2. (Indonesia) Angelique Widjaja
3. (Croatia) Jelena Kostanić
4. (Italy) Tathiana Garbin

=== Qualifying draw ===
==== First qualifier ====
First round
1	(Germany) Jana Kandarr	1	6^{4}
WC	(Germany) Adriana Barna	6	7^{7}
(United Kingdom) Julie Pullin	6^{3}	4
(Austria) Patricia Wartusch	7^{7}	6
(Germany) Angelika Bachmann	6	1	4
(France) Camille Pin	1	6	6
PR	(Canada) Vanessa Webb	6	6
6	(Netherlands) Kristie Boogert	4	2

Second round
WC	(Germany) Adriana Barna	2	6^{4}
(Austria) Patricia Wartusch	6	7^{7}
(France) Camille Pin	6	3	6
PR	(Canada) Vanessa Webb	1	6	2

Qualifying competition
(Austria) Patricia Wartusch	2	2
(France) Camille Pin	6	6

==== Second qualifier ====
First round
2	(Slovenia) Maja Matevžič	2	0
(Indonesia) Angelique Widjaja	6	6
(United Kingdom) Lucie Ahl	6	3	6
WC	(United Kingdom) Lorna Woodroffe	3	6	1
(Hungary) Kira Nagy	6	6
(Russia) Anastasia Rodionova	2	2
WC	(Italy) Roberta Vinci	6	6
8	(Czech Republic) Lenka Němečková	2	2

Second round
(Indonesia) Angelique Widjaja	6	6
(United Kingdom) Lucie Ahl	3	2
(Hungary) Kira Nagy	2	2
WC	(Italy) Roberta Vinci	6	6

Qualifying competition
(Indonesia) Angelique Widjaja	6	6
WC	(Italy) Roberta Vinci	0	3

==== Third qualifier ====
First round
3	(Sweden) Åsa Svensson	7	6
(Hungary) Katalin Marosi	5	2
(Germany) Nina Dübbers	6	6
(Czech Republic) Iveta Benešová	4	4
WC	(United States) Abigail Spears	4	1
(France) Laurence Andretto	6	6
Alt	(South Africa) Kim Grant	3	0
5	(Croatia) Jelena Kostanić	6	6

Second round
3	(Sweden) Åsa Svensson	7	3	6
(Germany) Nina Dübbers	5	6	1
(France) Laurence Andretto	6^{7}	2
5	(Croatia) Jelena Kostanić	7^{9}	6

Qualifying competition
3	(Sweden) Åsa Svensson	6^{8}	2
5	(Croatia) Jelena Kostanić	7^{10}	6

==== Fourth qualifier ====
First round
4	(Italy) Tathiana Garbin	6	6
(Belarus) Nadejda Ostrovskaya	1	3
(France) Alexandra Fusai	7^{7}	7
(Chinese Taipei) Hsieh Su-wei	6^{4}	5
PR	(Germany) Sandra Klösel	2	0
PR	(Belarus) Olga Barabanschikova	6	6
(Venezuela) María Vento-Kabchi	5	4
7	(Czech Republic) Sandra Kleinová	7	7

Second round
4	(Italy) Tathiana Garbin	6	3	6
(France) Alexandra Fusai	3	6	1
PR	(Belarus) Olga Barabanschikova	6	7^{7}
7	(Czech Republic) Sandra Kleinová	3	6^{3}

Qualifying competition
4	(Italy) Tathiana Garbin	6	3	6
PR	(Belarus) Olga Barabanschikova	3	6	4
