= 1996 Indonesia Open – Doubles =

Doubles
- 1996 Indonesia Open
- 1995 Champions: (South Africa) David Adams (Russia) Andrei Olhovskiy

Final
- Champions: (United States) Rick Leach (United States) Scott Melville
- Runners-up: (United States) Kent Kinnear (United States) Dave Randall
- Score: 6–1, 2–6, 6–1

Details
- Draw: 16
- Seeds: 4

Events
Singles	Doubles
← 1995 ·	Indonesia Open

The 1996 Indonesia Open – Doubles was an event of the 1996 Indonesia Open men's tennis tournament which held from 8 January until 14 January 1996 at the Gelora Senayan Stadium in Jakarta, Indonesia. The tournament was part of World Series of the 1996 ATP Tour. The doubles draw consisted of 16 teams and four of them were seeded.

David Adams and Andrei Olhovskiy were the defending champions but only Olhovskiy competed that year with Patrick Galbraith. Galbraith and Olhovskiy lost in the first round to Neil Broad and Piet Norval.

The second-seeded team of Rick Leach and Scott Melville won the doubles title after defeating the unseeded team of Kent Kinnear and Dave Randall 6–1, 2–6, 6–1 in the final.

== Seeds ==
Champion seeds are indicated in bold text while text in italics indicates the round in which those seeds were eliminated.

1. (United States) Patrick Galbraith / (Russia) Andrei Olhovskiy (first round)
2. (United States) **Rick Leach** / (United States) **Scott Melville (champions)**
3. (Netherlands) Menno Oosting / (France) Guillaume Raoux (quarterfinals)
4. (Sweden) Jan Apell / (Sweden) Peter Nyborg (semifinals)

== Draw ==
=== Key ===
- Q = Qualifier
- WC = Wild card
- LL = Lucky loser
- Alt = Alternate
- SE = Special exempt
- PR = Protected ranking
- ITF = ITF entry
- JE = Junior exempt
- w/o = Walkover
- r = Retired
- d = Defaulted
- SR = Special ranking

First round
1	(United States) P Galbraith (Russia) A Olhovskiy	3	5
(United Kingdom) **N Broad** (South Africa) **P Norval**	**6**	**7**
(Spain) **E Sánchez** (Netherlands) **S Schalken**	4	**6**	**6**
WC	(France) F Santoro (Indonesia) S Suwandi	**6**	3	4
3	(Netherlands) **M Oosting** (France) **G Raoux**	**6**	**6**
WC	(Indonesia) A Raturandang (Indonesia) D Susetyo	1	1
(United States) **K Kinnear** (United States) **D Randall**	**6**	**6**
Q	(Sweden) R Bergh (Sweden) D Ekerot	4	3
(Belgium) L Pimek (South Africa) B Talbot	6	**7**	4
(United States) **S Cannon** (Czech Republic) **V Flégl**	**7**	6	**6**
(South Africa) L Bale (South Africa) B Haygarth	3	**6**	6
4	(Sweden) **J Apell** (Sweden) **P Nyborg**	**6**	3	**7**
(South Africa) **J-L de Jager** (South Africa) **G Muller**	**6**	**6**
WC	(Indonesia) S da Costa (Indonesia) E Kusdaryanto	2	4
(Netherlands) T Kempers (Netherlands) S Noteboom	1	3
2	(United States) **R Leach** (United States) **S Melville**	**6**	**6**

Quarterfinals
(United Kingdom) N Broad (South Africa) P Norval	4	**7**	6
(Spain) **E Sánchez** (Netherlands) **S Schalken**	**6**	5	**7**
3	(Netherlands) M Oosting (France) G Raoux	4	2
(United States) **K Kinnear** (United States) **D Randall**	**6**	**6**
(United States) S Cannon (Czech Republic) V Flégl	**7**	4	4
4	(Sweden) **J Apell** (Sweden) **P Nyborg**	6	**6**	**6**
(South Africa) J-L de Jager (South Africa) G Muller	6	6
2	(United States) **R Leach** (United States) **S Melville**	**7**	**7**

Semifinals
(Spain) E Sánchez (Netherlands) S Schalken	4	**7**	3
(United States) **K Kinnear** (United States) **D Randall**	**6**	6	**6**
4	(Sweden) J Apell (Sweden) P Nyborg	6	4
2	(United States) **R Leach** (United States) **S Melville**	**7**	**6**

Final
(United States) Kent Kinnear (United States) Dave Randall	1	**6**	1
2	(United States) **Rick Leach** (United States) **Scott Melville**	**6**	2	**6**
