= 2002 Dubai Tennis Championships – Singles =

Singles
- 2002 Dubai Tennis Championships and the Dubai Duty Free Women's Open

Final
- Champion: (France) Fabrice Santoro
- Runner-up: (Morocco) Younes El Aynaoui
- Score: 6–4, 3–6, 6–3

Details
- Draw: 32 (3WC/4Q)
- Seeds: 8

Events
| Singles | men | women |
| Doubles | men | women |
- Dubai Tennis Championships Dubai Duty Free Women's Open

Juan Carlos Ferrero was the defending champion, but lost in the second round to Younes El Aynaoui.

Fabrice Santoro won in the final 6–4, 3–6, 6–3 against El Aynaoui.

== Seeds ==
A champion seed is indicated in bold text while text in italics indicates the round in which that seed was eliminated.

1. (Spain) Juan Carlos Ferrero (second round, retired because of a pulled abductor)
2. (Russia) Yevgeny Kafelnikov (quarterfinals)
3. (Sweden) Thomas Johansson (semifinals)
4. (France) Sébastien Grosjean (second round)
5. (United Kingdom) Tim Henman (quarterfinals)
6. (Switzerland) Roger Federer (second round)
7. (Croatia) Goran Ivanišević (first round)
8. (Czech Republic) Jiří Novák (semifinals)

== Draw ==
Key

- Q = Qualifier
- WC = Wild card
- LL = Lucky loser
- Alt = Alternate
- ITF = ITF entry
- PR = Protected ranking
- SR = Special ranking
- SE = Special exempt
- JE = Junior exempt
- JR = Junior Accelerator Programme entrant
- CO = College Accelerator Programme entrant
- NG = Next Gen Accelerator Program entrant
- w/o = Walkover
- r = Retired
- d = Defaulted

First round
1 | (Spain) **J C Ferrero** | **7**
(Czech Republic) B Ulihrach | 5 | r
(Romania) A Pavel | 5 | **6** | 4
(Morocco) **Y El Aynaoui** | **7** | 2 | **6**
(Germany) **R Schüttler** | **6** | **6**
(Spain) T Robredo | 3 | 2
Q | (Romania) A Voinea | 3 | 4
6 | (Switzerland) **R Federer** | **6** | **6**
3 | (Sweden) **T Johansson** | **6** | **6**
(Spain) A Costa | 3 | 0
(Russia) M Youzhny | 3 | 4
(Spain) **Á Calatrava** | **6** | **6**
(Belarus) **M Mirnyi** | **7^{7}** | **6**
Q | (Italy) R Furlan | 6^{5} | 3
WC | (United Arab Emirates) O Bahrouzyan | 1 | 0
5 | (United Kingdom) **T Henman** | **6** | **6**
7 | (Croatia) G Ivanišević | 3 | 4
(Germany) **N Kiefer** | **6** | **6**
WC | (France) C Pioline | 3 | 2
(Croatia) **I Ljubičić** | **6** | **6**
Q | (Germany) M Kohlmann | 6^{0} | **6** | 4
(France) **F Santoro** | **7^{7}** | 3 | **6**
(Austria) S Koubek | 2 | 2
3 | (France) **S Grosjean** | **6** | **6**
8 | (Czech Republic) **J Novák** | **6** | **6**
(Slovakia) D Hrbatý | 2 | 1
(Germany) **A Pretzsch** | **6** | **6**
(France) J Boutter | 4 | 4
WC | (Netherlands) **S Schalken** | **6** | **7^{7}**
(France) A Clément | 3 | 6^{1}
Q | (Greece) V Mazarakis | 4 | 5
2 | (Russia) **Y Kafelnikov** | **6** | **7**

Second round
1 | (Spain) J C Ferrero | 5 | **6** | 1^{r}
(Morocco) **Y El Aynaoui** | **7** | 4 | 2
(Germany) **R Schüttler** | **6** | **6**
6 | (Switzerland) R Federer | 3 | 1
3 | (Sweden) **T Johansson** | **6** | 2
(Spain) Á Calatrava | 2 | 1^{r}
(Belarus) M Mirnyi | 4 | 4
5 | (United Kingdom) **T Henman** | **6** | **6**
(Germany) N Kiefer | 4 | 2
(Croatia) **I Ljubičić** | **6** | **6**
(France) **F Santoro** | **6** | **7**
4 | (France) S Grosjean | 2 | 5
8 | (Czech Republic) **J Novák** | **7** | **6**
(Germany) A Pretzsch | 5 | 0
WC | (Netherlands) S Schalken | 1 | 6^{5}
2 | (Russia) **Y Kafelnikov** | **6** | **7^{7}**

Quarterfinals
(Morocco) **Y El Aynaoui** | 6^{3} | **6** | **6**
(Germany) R Schüttler | **7^{7}** | 4 | 3
3 | (Sweden) **T Johansson** | **6** | **6**
5 | (United Kingdom) T Henman | 4 | 3
(Croatia) I Ljubičić | 4 | 6^{5}
(France) **F Santoro** | **6** | **7^{7}**
8 | (Czech Republic) **J Novák** | **6** | **6**
2 | (Russia) Y Kafelnikov | 1 | 1

Semifinals
(Morocco) **Y El Aynaoui** | **7^{7}** | 4 | **6**
3 | (Sweden) T Johansson | 6^{5} | **6** | 3
(France) **F Santoro** | 5 | **6** | **7^{7}**
8 | (Czech Republic) J Novák | **7** | 3 | 6^{4}

Final
(Morocco) Younes El Aynaoui | 4 | **6** | 3
(France) **Fabrice Santoro** | **6** | 3 | **6**

== Qualifying ==
=== Qualifying seeds ===
1. (Romania) **Adrian Voinea (qualified)**
2. (Slovakia) Karol Kučera (first round)
3. (Georgia (country)) Irakli Labadze (first round)
4. (Germany) **Michael Kohlmann (qualified)**
5. (Russia) Andrei Stoliarov (qualifying competition)
6. (Belarus) Vladimir Voltchkov (first round)
7. (Italy) Stefano Galvani (qualifying competition)
8. (Uzbekistan) Oleg Ogorodov (qualifying competition)

=== Qualifiers ===
1. (Romania) **Adrian Voinea**
2. (Greece) **Vasilis Mazarakis**
3. (Italy) **Renzo Furlan**
4. (Germany) **Michael Kohlmann**

=== Qualifying draw ===
==== First qualifier ====
First round
1 | **(Romania) Adrian Voinea** | **7** | 4 | **6**
(Finland) Tuomas Ketola | 5 | **6** | 3
(Slovakia) Ján Krošlák | 5 | 2
7 | **(Italy) Stefano Galvani** | **7** | **6**

Qualifying competition
1 | **(Romania) Adrian Voinea** | 0 | **7^{7}** | **6**
7 | (Italy) Stefano Galvani | **6** | 6^{3} | 3

==== Second qualifier ====
First round
2/WC | (Slovakia) Karol Kučera | 4 | 1
**(Greece) Vasilis Mazarakis** | **6** | **6**
WC | (Morocco) Mehdi Tahiri | 3 | 4
8 | **(Uzbekistan) Oleg Ogorodov** | **6** | **6**

Qualifying competition
**(Greece) Vasilis Mazarakis** | **6** | **6**
8 | (Uzbekistan) Oleg Ogorodov | 4 | 1

==== Third qualifier ====
First round
3 | (Georgia (country)) Irakli Labadze | 4 | **6** | 2
**(Italy) Renzo Furlan** | **6** | 2 | **6**
WC | **(United States) Jeff Tarango** | **6** | **6**
6 | (Belarus) Vladimir Voltchkov | 1 | 4

Qualifying competition
**(Italy) Renzo Furlan** | **6** | 2 | **6**
WC | (United States) Jeff Tarango | 3 | **6** | 3

==== Fourth qualifier ====
First round
4 | **(Germany) Michael Kohlmann** | **6** | 1 | **6**
(Netherlands) Rogier Wassen | 2 | **6** | 1
(Uzbekistan) Vadim Kutsenko | 2 | **6** | 4
5 | **(Russia) Andrei Stoliarov** | **6** | 4 | **6**

Qualifying competition
4 | **(Germany) Michael Kohlmann** | 4 | **6** | **6**
5 | (Russia) Andrei Stoliarov | **6** | 4 | 1
