= 2002 Dubai Duty Free Women's Open – Doubles =

Doubles
- 2002 Dubai Tennis Championships and the Dubai Duty Free Women's Open

Final
- Champions: (Germany) Barbara Rittner (Venezuela) María Vento-Kabchi
- Runners-up: (France) Sandrine Testud (Italy) Roberta Vinci
- Score: 6–3, 6–2

Details
- Draw: 16 (1WC/1Q)
- Seeds: 4

Events
Singles	men	women
Doubles	men	women
- Dubai Tennis Championships Dubai Duty Free Women's Open

Yayuk Basuki and Caroline Vis were the defending champions, but Basuki did not compete this year. Vis teamed up with Alexandra Fusai and lost in quarterfinals to tournament winners Barbara Rittner and María Vento-Kabchi.

Barbara Rittner and María Vento-Kabchi won the title by defeating Sandrine Testud and Roberta Vinci 6–3, 6–2 in the final.

== Seeds ==
1. (France) Sandrine Testud / (Italy) Roberta Vinci (final)
2. (France) Alexandra Fusai / (Netherlands) Caroline Vis (quarterfinals)
3. (Slovakia) Janette Husárová / (Sweden) Åsa Svensson (quarterfinals)
4. (Italy) Tathiana Garbin / (Italy) Rita Grande (semifinals)

== Draw ==
Key

- Q = Qualifier
- WC = Wild card
- LL = Lucky loser
- Alt = Alternate
- ITF = ITF entry
- PR = Protected ranking
- SR = Special ranking
- SE = Special exempt
- JE = Junior exempt
- JR = Junior Accelerator Programme entrant
- CO = College Accelerator Programme entrant
- NG = Next Gen Accelerator Program entrant
- w/o = Walkover
- r = Retired
- d = Defaulted

=== Draw ===
First round
1	(France) S Testud (Italy) R Vinci	6	6
(Hungary) K Marosi-Aracama (Russia) A Rodionova	3	2
(Australia) R McQuillan (Australia) A Molik	6	3	4
(United Kingdom) J Pullin (United Kingdom) L Woodroffe	2	6	6
4	(Italy) T Garbin (Italy) R Grande	6	7
(Czech Republic) L Němečková (Canada) V Webb	1	5
(South Africa) K Grant (United States) A Spears	2	4
WC	(Germany) S Klösel (Belarus) N Ostrovskaya	6	6
Q	(Chinese Taipei) S-w Hsieh (Indonesia) A Widjaja	6	6
(Russia) T Panova (Belarus) T Poutchek	4	3
(Russia) A Myskina (Slovenia) T Pisnik	4	4
3	(Slovakia) J Husárová (Sweden) Å Svensson	6	6
(Germany) B Rittner (Venezuela) M Vento-Kabchi	7^{12}	6
(Hungary) P Mandula (Austria) P Wartusch	6^{10}	2
(Netherlands) K Boogert (Australia) N Pratt	6^{2}	6	2
2	(France) A Fusai (Netherlands) C Vis	7^{7}	3	6

Quarterfinals
1	(France) S Testud (Italy) R Vinci	7	6
(United Kingdom) J Pullin (United Kingdom) L Woodroffe	5	2
4	(Italy) T Garbin (Italy) R Grande	7^{7}	6
WC	(Germany) S Klösel (Belarus) N Ostrovskaya	6^{1}	0
Q	(Chinese Taipei) S-w Hsieh (Indonesia) A Widjaja	6	5	6
3	(Slovakia) J Husárová (Sweden) Å Svensson	4	7	2
(Germany) B Rittner (Venezuela) M Vento-Kabchi	6	3	6
2	(France) A Fusai (Netherlands) C Vis	4	6	4

Semifinals
1	(France) S Testud (Italy) R Vinci	6	6
4	(Italy) T Garbin (Italy) R Grande	3	3
Q	(Chinese Taipei) S-w Hsieh (Indonesia) A Widjaja	7	3	2
(Germany) B Rittner (Venezuela) M Vento-Kabchi	5	6	6

Final
1	(France) S Testud (Italy) R Vinci	3	2
(Germany) B Rittner (Venezuela) M Vento-Kabchi	6	6

== Qualifying ==
=== Qualifying seeds ===
1. (Germany) Angelika Bachmann / (Germany) Nina Dübbers (first round)
2. (United Kingdom) Lucie Ahl / (Croatia) Jelena Kostanić (qualifying competition)

=== Qualifiers ===
1. (Chinese Taipei) Hsieh Su-wei / (Indonesia) Angelique Widjaja

=== Qualifying draw ===
First round
1	(Germany) Angelika Bachmann (Germany) Nina Dübbers	5
(Chinese Taipei) Hsieh Su-wei (Indonesia) Angelique Widjaja	8
(Germany) Adriana Barna (Belarus) Olga Barabanschikova	5
2	(United Kingdom) Lucie Ahl (Croatia) Jelena Kostanić	8

Qualifying competition
(Chinese Taipei) Hsieh Su-wei (Indonesia) Angelique Widjaja	6	3	6
2	(United Kingdom) Lucie Ahl (Croatia) Jelena Kostanić	4	6	0
