= The Legends Rock Dubai =

The Legends Rock Dubai is the last event in the Outback Champions Series for senior tennis players. It is held each year in November in Dubai, UAE.

Players who have participated in this event include Anders Järryd, Björn Borg, Cédric Pioline, Guy Forget, and Jim Courier.
