= 1994 Indonesia Open =

- Date: 10–15 January
- Edition: 2nd
- Category: World Series
- Draw: 32S / 16D
- Prize money: $288,750
- Surface: Hard / outdoor
- Location: Jakarta, Indonesia
- Venue: Gelora Senayan Stadium

Champions

Singles
- (United States) Michael Chang

Doubles
- (Sweden) Jonas Björkman / (Australia) Neil Borwick
- Jakarta Open

The 1994 Indonesia Open was a men's tennis tournament played on outdoor hard courts at the Gelora Senayan Stadium in Jakarta in Indonesia that was part of the World Series of the 1994 ATP Tour. It was the second edition of the tournament since its reboot in 1993 and was held from 10 January through 15 January 1994. Second-seeded Michael Chang won his second consecutive singles title at the tournament.

== Finals ==
=== Singles ===
(United States) Michael Chang defeated (Czech Republic) David Rikl 6–3, 6–3

- It was Chang's first singles title of the year and the 10th of his career.

=== Doubles ===
(Sweden) Jonas Björkman / (Australia) Neil Borwick defeated (Mexico) Jorge Lozano / (United States) Jim Pugh 6–4, 6–1

- It was Björkman's 1st doubles title of his career. It was Borwick's only doubles title of his career.
