= Jakarta Open =

Defunct tennis tournament
- Tour: ATP Tour
- Founded: 1973
- Abolished: 1996
- Editions: 6
- Location: Jakarta, Indonesia
- Category: World Series (1993–1996)
- Surface: Hard

The Jakarta Open was a men's tennis tournament played in Jakarta, Indonesia. The event was held in 1973 and 1974 and from 1993 to 1996 and was played on outdoor hard courts. It was part of the World Series circuit of the Association of Tennis Professionals (ATP) Tour.

== Finals ==
=== Singles ===
Year	Champions	Runners-up	Score
1973	(Australia) John Newcombe	(Australia) Ross Case	7–6, 7–6, 6–3
1974	(New Zealand) Onny Parun	(Australia) Kim Warwick	6–3, 3–6, 6–4
1975-1992	Not held		
1993	(United States) Michael Chang	(Germany) Carl-Uwe Steeb	2–6, 6–2, 6–1
1994	(United States) Michael Chang	(Czech Republic) David Rikl	6–3, 6–3
1995	(Netherlands) Paul Haarhuis	(Czech Republic) Radomír Vašek	7–5, 7–5
1996	(Netherlands) Sjeng Schalken	(Morocco) Younes El Aynaoui	6–3, 6–2

=== Doubles ===
Year	Champions	Runners-up	Score
1973	(United States) Mike Estep (Australia) Ian Fletcher	(Australia) John Newcombe (Australia) Allan Stone	7–5, 6–4
1974	(Egypt) Ismail El Shafei (United States) Roscoe Tanner	(Germany) Jürgen Fassbender (Germany) Hans-Jürgen Pohmann	7–5, 6–3
1975-1992	Not held		
1993	(Italy) Diego Nargiso (France) Guillaume Raoux	(Netherlands) Jacco Eltingh (Netherlands) Paul Haarhuis	7–6, 6–7, 6–3
1994	(Sweden) Jonas Björkman (Australia) Neil Borwick	(Mexico) Jorge Lozano (United States) Jim Pugh	6–4, 6–1
1995	(South Africa) David Adams (Russia) Andrei Olhovskiy	(Haiti) Ronald Agénor (Japan) Shuzo Matsuoka	7–5, 6–3
1996	(United States) Rick Leach (United States) Scott Melville	(United States) Kent Kinnear (United States) Dave Randall	6–1, 2–6, 6–1

== See also ==
- Danamon Open – women's tournament (1993–1997)
