= Paul Haarhuis =

Dutch tennis player (born 1966)

- Country (sports): Netherlands
- Residence: Monaco
- Born: 19 February 1966 (age 60) Eindhoven, Netherlands
- Height: 1.87 m (6 ft 1 1/2 in)
- Turned pro: 1989
- Retired: 2003
- Plays: Right-handed (two-handed backhand)
- Prize money: $7,751,962

Singles
- Career record: 267–258
- Career titles: 1
- Highest ranking: No. 18 (6 November 1995)

Grand Slam singles results
- Australian Open: 3R (1994)
- French Open: 4R (1993)
- Wimbledon: 4R (1996)
- US Open: QF (1991)

Other tournaments
- Grand Slam Cup: 1R (1991)

Doubles
- Career record: 607–238
- Career titles: 54
- Highest ranking: No. 1 (31 January 1994)

Grand Slam doubles results
- Australian Open: W (1994)
- French Open: W (1995, 1998, 2002)
- Wimbledon: W (1998)
- US Open: W (1994)

Other doubles tournaments
- Olympic Games: SF – 4th (1996)

Paul Vincent Nicholas Haarhuis (Dutch pronunciation: [pʌul ˈhaːrhœys]; born 19 February 1966) is a Dutch tennis coach and a former professional player. He is a former world No. 1 doubles player, having reached a career-high singles ranking of world No. 18 in November 1995. He has won 54 doubles titles, including six Grand Slam titles, five with Jacco Eltingh, and one with Yevgeny Kafelnikov.

== Personal life ==
Haarhuis was born on 19 February 1966 in Eindhoven in the Netherlands. He played tennis for Armstrong State College and Florida State University. He supports PSV Eindhoven.

== Professional career ==
He is best known for his success in doubles with fellow countryman Jacco Eltingh, winning five Grand Slam titles together, although some would say he is best known for his 4 set loss to Jimmy Connors in the 1991 U.S. Open quarterfinals. He is, together with Sergi Bruguera, Richard Krajicek, Leander Paes, and Michael Stich, one of the players of the same generation with a positive head-to-head record against Pete Sampras: 3–1.

His best Grand Slam singles performance was reaching the quarterfinals of the 1991 US Open, where he defeated Eric Jelen, Andrei Chesnokov, top seed Boris Becker and Carl-Uwe Steeb, before losing to Jimmy Connors.

After retiring, he won the end-of-year Blackrock Masters Tennis tournament in the Royal Albert Hall in 2005 and 2006, beating legends such as Goran Ivanišević and John McEnroe. He completed a hat-trick of victories in the tournament in 2007, beating Frenchman Guy Forget.

== Coaching career ==
In 2014 Haarhuis succeeded Manon Bollegraf as captain of the Netherlands Fed Cup team until 2021. He is currently coaching the Netherlands Davis Cup team.

== Grand Slam finals ==
=== Doubles: 13 (6 titles / 7 runners-up) ===
Result	Year	Championship	Surface	Partner	Opponents	Score
Win	1994	Australian Open	Hard	(Netherlands) Jacco Eltingh	(Zimbabwe) Byron Black (United States) Jonathan Stark	6–7^{(3–7)}, 6–3, 6–4, 6–3
Win	1994	US Open	Hard	(Netherlands) Jacco Eltingh	(Australia) Todd Woodbridge (Australia) Mark Woodforde	6–3, 7–6^{(7–1)}
Win	1995	French Open	Clay	(Netherlands) Jacco Eltingh	(Sweden) Nicklas Kulti (Sweden) Magnus Larsson	6–7^{(3–7)}, 6–4, 6–1
Loss	1996	US Open	Hard	(Netherlands) Jacco Eltingh	(Australia) Todd Woodbridge (Australia) Mark Woodforde	6–4, 6–7^{(5–7)}, 6–7^{(5–7)}
Loss	1997	Wimbledon	Grass	(Netherlands) Jacco Eltingh	(Australia) Todd Woodbridge (Australia) Mark Woodforde	6–7^{(4–7)}, 6–7^{(7–9)}, 7–5, 3–6
Win	1998	French Open (2)	Clay	(Netherlands) Jacco Eltingh	(The Bahamas) Mark Knowles (Canada) Daniel Nestor	6–3, 3–6, 6–3
Win	1998	Wimbledon	Grass	(Netherlands) Jacco Eltingh	(Australia) Todd Woodbridge (Australia) Mark Woodforde	2–6, 6–4, 7–6^{(7–3)}, 5–7, 10–8
Loss	1999	Wimbledon (2)	Grass	(United States) Jared Palmer	(India) Mahesh Bhupathi (India) Leander Paes	7–6^{(12–10)}, 3–6, 4–6, 6–7^{(4–7)}
Loss	2000	French Open (2)	Clay	(Australia) Sandon Stolle	(Australia) Todd Woodbridge (Australia) Mark Woodforde	6–7^{(7–9)}, 4–6
Loss	2000	Wimbledon (3)	Grass	(Australia) Sandon Stolle	(Australia) Todd Woodbridge (Australia) Mark Woodforde	3–6, 4–6, 1–6
Win	2002	French Open (3)	Clay	(Russia) Yevgeny Kafelnikov	(The Bahamas) Mark Knowles (Canada) Daniel Nestor	7–5, 6–4
Loss	2003	French Open	Clay	(Russia) Yevgeny Kafelnikov	(United States) Bob Bryan (United States) Mike Bryan	6–7^{(3–7)}, 3–6

=== Mixed doubles (1 runner-up) ===
Result	Year	Championship	Surface	Partner	Opponents	Score
Loss	1991	French Open	Clay	(Netherlands) Caroline Vis	(Czechoslovakia) Helena Suková (Czechoslovakia) Cyril Suk	6–3, 4–6, 1–6

== Career finals ==
=== Singles: 8 (1 title / 7 runner-ups) ===
Result	W/L	Date	Tournament	Surface	Opponent	Score
Loss	0–1	Apr 1992	Singapore	Hard	(Australia) Simon Youl	4–6, 1–6
Loss	0–2	Jan 1994	Doha, Qatar	Hard	(Sweden) Stefan Edberg	3–6, 2–6
Loss	0–3	Feb 1994	Philadelphia, U.S.	Carpet	(United States) Michael Chang	3–6, 2–6
Win	1–3	Jan 1995	Jakarta, Indonesia	Hard	(Czech Republic) Radomír Vašek	7–5, 7–5
Loss	1–4	Feb 1995	Memphis, U.S.	Hard (i)	(United States) Todd Martin	6–7^{(4–7)}, 4–6
Loss	1–5	Mar 1995	Rotterdam, Netherlands	Carpet	(Netherlands) Richard Krajicek	6–7^{(5–7)}, 4–6
Loss	1–6	Mar 1996	Indian Wells, U.S.	Hard	(United States) Michael Chang	5–7, 1–6, 1–6
Loss	1–8	Aug 1998	Boston, U.S.	Hard	(United States) Michael Chang	3–6, 4–6

=== Doubles: 94 (54 titles / 40 runner-ups) ===
Finals by category Grand Slam tournaments (6–6) Tennis Masters Cup (2–1) ATP Masters Series (10–11) ATP Championship Series (7–5) ATP Tour (29–17)	Finals by surface Hard (19–13) Clay (15–13) Grass (5–6) Carpet (15–8)

Result	W/L	Date	Tournament	Surface	Partner	Opponents	Score
Loss	1.	Jan 1990	Auckland, New Zealand	Hard	(Israel) Gilad Bloom	(United States) Kelly Jones (United States) Robert Van't Hof	6–7, 0–6
Loss	2.	Mar 1990	Casablanca, Morocco	Clay	(Netherlands) Mark Koevermans	(Australia) Todd Woodbridge (Australia) Simon Youl	3–6, 1–6
Loss	3.	Jul 1990	Hilversum, Netherlands	Clay	(Netherlands) Mark Koevermans	(Spain) Sergio Casal (Spain) Emilio Sánchez	5–7, 5–7
Win	1.	Nov 1990	Moscow, Russia (1)	Carpet	(Netherlands) Hendrik Jan Davids	(Australia) John Fitzgerald (Sweden) Anders Järryd	6–4, 7–6
Loss	4.	Jan 1991	Adelaide, Australia	Hard	(Netherlands) Mark Koevermans	(South Africa) Wayne Ferreira (South Africa) Stefan Kruger	4–6, 6–4, 4–6
Win	2.	Apr 1991	Estoril, Portugal	Clay	(Netherlands) Mark Koevermans	(Netherlands) Tom Nijssen (Czech Republic) Cyril Suk	6–3, 6–3
Loss	5.	Apr 1991	Monte Carlo, Monaco	Clay	(Netherlands) Mark Koevermans	(United States) Luke Jensen (Australia) Laurie Warder	7–5, 6–7, 4–6
Win	3.	Jun 1991	Rosmalen, Netherlands (1)	Grass	(Netherlands) Hendrik Jan Davids	(Netherlands) Richard Krajicek (Netherlands) Jan Siemerink	6–3, 7–6
Win	4.	Oct 1991	Guarujá, Brazil	Hard	(Netherlands) Jacco Eltingh	(United States) Bret Garnett (United States) Todd Nelson	6–3, 7–5
Loss	6.	Mar 1992	Rotterdam, Netherlands	Carpet	(Netherlands) Mark Koevermans	(Germany) Marc-Kevin Goellner (Germany) David Prinosil	2–6, 7–6, 6–7
Loss	7.	Jun 1992	Genova, Italy	Clay	(Netherlands) Mark Koevermans	(United States) Shelby Cannon (United States) Greg Van Emburgh	1–6, 1–6
Win	5.	Jul 1992	Hilversum, Netherlands (1)	Clay	(Netherlands) Mark Koevermans	(Sweden) Marten Renström (Sweden) Mikael Tillström	6–7, 6–1, 6–4
Win	6.	Aug 1992	Schenectady, U.S.	Hard	(Netherlands) Jacco Eltingh	(Spain) Sergio Casal (Spain) Emilio Sánchez	6–3, 6–4
Win	7.	Jan 1993	Kuala Lumpur-1, Malaysia	Hard	(Netherlands) Jacco Eltingh	(Sweden) Henrik Holm (Norway) Bent-Ove Pedersen	7–5, 6–3
Loss	8.	Jan 1993	Jakarta, Indonesia	Hard	(Netherlands) Jacco Eltingh	(Italy) Diego Garcia (France) Guillaume Raoux	6–7, 7–6, 3–6
Loss	9.	Feb 1993	Memphis, U.S.	Hard (i)	(Netherlands) Jacco Eltingh	(Australia) Todd Woodbridge (Australia) Mark Woodforde	5–7, 2–6
Loss	10.	Apr 1993	Monte Carlo, Monaco	Clay	(Netherlands) Mark Koevermans	(Sweden) Stefan Edberg (Czech Republic) Petr Korda	6–3, 2–6, 6–7
Win	8.	May 1993	Hamburg, Germany	Clay	(Netherlands) Mark Koevermans	(Canada) Grant Connell (United States) Patrick Galbraith	6–4, 6–7, 7–6
Win	9.	May 1993	Rome, Italy	Clay	(Netherlands) Jacco Eltingh	(South Africa) Wayne Ferreira (Australia) Mark Kratzmann	6–4, 7–6
Win	10.	Aug 1993	Hilversum, Netherlands (2)	Clay	(Netherlands) Jacco Eltingh	(Netherlands) Hendrik Jan Davids (Belgium) Libor Pimek	4–6, 6–2, 7–5
Win	11.	Oct 1993	Kuala Lumpur-2, Malaysia (1)	Hard (i)	(Netherlands) Jacco Eltingh	(Sweden) Jonas Björkman (Sweden) Lars-Anders Wahlgren	7–5, 4–6, 7–6
Loss	11.	Oct 1993	Beijing, China	Carpet	(Netherlands) Jacco Eltingh	(United States) Paul Annacone (United States) Doug Flach	6–7, 3–6
Win	12.	Nov 1993	Moscow, Russia (2)	Carpet	(Netherlands) Jacco Eltingh	(Sweden) Jonas Björkman (Sweden) Jan Apell	6–1, retired
Win	13.	Nov 1993	Doubles Championship, Johannesburg (1)	Hard (i)	(Netherlands) Jacco Eltingh	(Australia) Todd Woodbridge (Australia) Mark Woodforde	7–6^{(4)}, 7–6^{(5)}, 6–4
Win	14.	Jan 1994	Australian Open, Melbourne	Hard	(Netherlands) Jacco Eltingh	(Zimbabwe) Byron Black (United States) Jonathan Stark	6–7, 6–3, 6–4, 6–3
Win	15.	Feb 1994	Philadelphia, U.S. (1)	Carpet	(Netherlands) Jacco Eltingh	(United States) Jim Grabb (United States) Jared Palmer	6–3, 6–4
Loss	12.	Feb 1994	Rotterdam, Netherlands	Carpet	(Netherlands) Jacco Eltingh	(United Kingdom) Jeremy Bates (Sweden) Jonas Björkman	4–6, 1–6
Win	16.	Mar 1994	Key Biscayne, U.S.	Hard	(Netherlands) Jacco Eltingh	(The Bahamas) Mark Knowles (United States) Jared Palmer	7–6, 7–6
Loss	13.	Jul 1994	Stuttgart Outdoor, Germany	Clay	(Netherlands) Jacco Eltingh	(United States) Scott Melville (South Africa) Piet Norval	6–7, 5–7
Loss	14.	Aug 1994	New Haven, U.S.	Hard	(Netherlands) Jacco Eltingh	(Canada) Grant Connell (United States) Patrick Galbraith	4–6, 6–7
Loss	15.	Aug 1994	Schenectady, U.S.	Hard	(Netherlands) Jacco Eltingh	(Sweden) Jan Apell (Sweden) Jonas Björkman	4–6, 6–7
Win	17.	Sep 1994	US Open, New York City	Hard	(Netherlands) Jacco Eltingh	(Australia) Todd Woodbridge (Australia) Mark Woodforde	6–3, 7–6
Win	18.	Oct 1994	Kuala Lumpur, Malaysia (2)	Carpet	(Netherlands) Jacco Eltingh	(Sweden) Nicklas Kulti (Sweden) Lars-Anders Wahlgren	6–0, 7–5
Win	19.	Oct 1994	Sydney Indoor, Australia	Hard (i)	(Netherlands) Jacco Eltingh	(Zimbabwe) Byron Black (United States) Jonathan Stark	6–4, 7–6
Win	20.	Nov 1994	Paris Indoor, France (1)	Carpet	(Netherlands) Jacco Eltingh	(Zimbabwe) Byron Black (United States) Jonathan Stark	3–6, 7–6, 7–5
Win	21.	Nov 1994	Moscow, Russia (3)	Carpet	(Netherlands) Jacco Eltingh	(South Africa) David Adams (Russia) Andrei Olhovskiy	W/O
Loss	16.	Feb 1995	Philadelphia, U.S.	Carpet	(Netherlands) Jacco Eltingh	(United States) Jim Grabb (United States) Jonathan Stark	6–7, 7–6, 3–6
Win	22.	May 1995	Monte Carlo, Monaco (1)	Clay	(Netherlands) Jacco Eltingh	(Argentina) Luis Lobo (Spain) Javier Sánchez	6–3, 6–4
Win	23.	Jun 1995	French Open, Paris (1)	Clay	(Netherlands) Jacco Eltingh	(Sweden) Nicklas Kulti (Sweden) Magnus Larsson	6–7, 6–4, 6–1
Win	24.	Jun 1995	Halle, Germany	Grass	(Netherlands) Jacco Eltingh	(Russia) Yevgeny Kafelnikov (Russia) Andrei Olhovskiy	6–2, 3–6, 6–3
Win	25.	Oct 1995	Tokyo Indoor, Japan	Carpet	(Netherlands) Jacco Eltingh	(Switzerland) Jakob Hlasek (United States) Patrick McEnroe	7–6, 6–4
Win	26.	Oct 1995	Essen, Germany	Carpet	(Netherlands) Jacco Eltingh	(Czech Republic) Cyril Suk (Czech Republic) Daniel Vacek	7–5, 6–4
Win	27.	Nov 1995	Stockholm, Sweden	Hard (i)	(Netherlands) Jacco Eltingh	(Canada) Grant Connell (United States) Patrick Galbraith	3–6, 6–2, 7–6
Loss	17.	Nov 1995	Doubles Championship, Eindhoven	Carpet	(Netherlands) Jacco Eltingh	(Canada) Grant Connell (United States) Patrick Galbraith	6–7, 6–7, 6–3, 6–7
Loss	18.	Jan 1996	Doha, Qatar	Hard	(Netherlands) Jacco Eltingh	(The Bahamas) Mark Knowles (Canada) Daniel Nestor	6–7, 3–6
Win	28.	Aug 1996	Toronto, Canada	Hard	(United States) Patrick Galbraith	(The Bahamas) Mark Knowles (Canada) Daniel Nestor	7–6, 6–3
Loss	19.	Sep 1996	US Open, New York City	Hard	(Netherlands) Jacco Eltingh	(Australia) Todd Woodbridge (Australia) Mark Woodforde	6–4, 6–7, 6–7
Win	29.	Oct 1996	Toulouse, France (1)	Hard (i)	(Netherlands) Jacco Eltingh	(France) Olivier Delaître (France) Guillaume Raoux	6–3, 7–5
Loss	20.	Oct 1996	Stuttgart Indoor, Germany	Hard	(Netherlands) Jacco Eltingh	(Canada) Sébastien Lareau (United States) Alex O'Brien	6–3, 4–6, 3–6
Win	30.	Nov 1996	Paris Indoor, France (2)	Carpet	(Netherlands) Jacco Eltingh	(Russia) Yevgeny Kafelnikov (Czech Republic) Daniel Vacek	6–4, 4–6, 7–6
Win	31.	Jan 1997	Doha, Qatar	Hard	(Netherlands) Jacco Eltingh	(Sweden) Patrik Fredriksson (Sweden) Magnus Norman	6–3, 6–2
Loss	21.	Jan 1997	Sydney Outdoor, Australia	Hard	(Netherlands) Jan Siemerink	(Argentina) Luis Lobo (Spain) Javier Sánchez	4–6, 7–6, 3–6
Win	32.	Mar 1997	Rotterdam, Netherlands (1)	Carpet	(Netherlands) Jacco Eltingh	(Belgium) Libor Pimek (South Africa) Byron Talbot	7–6, 6–4
Loss	22.	Apr 1997	Monte Carlo, Monaco	Clay	(Netherlands) Jacco Eltingh	(United States) Donald Johnson (United States) Francisco Montana	6–7, 6–2, 6–7
Win	33.	Jun 1997	Rosmalen, Netherlands (2)	Grass	(Netherlands) Jacco Eltingh	(United States) Trevor Kronemann (Australia) David Macpherson	6–4, 7–5
Loss	23.	Jul 1997	Wimbledon, London	Grass	(Netherlands) Jacco Eltingh	(Australia) Todd Woodbridge (Australia) Mark Woodforde	6–7, 6–7, 7–5, 3–6
Win	34.	Aug 1997	Boston, U.S. (1)	Hard (i)	(Netherlands) Jacco Eltingh	(United States) Dave Randall (United States) Jack Waite	6–4, 6–2
Win	35.	Oct 1997	Toulouse, France (2)	Hard (i)	(Netherlands) Jacco Eltingh	(France) Jean-Philippe Fleurian (Belarus) Max Mirnyi	6–3, 7–6
Win	36.	Nov 1997	Paris Indoor, France (3)	Carpet	(Netherlands) Jacco Eltingh	(United States) Rick Leach (United States) Jonathan Stark	6–2, 7–6
Win	37.	Mar 1998	Philadelphia, U.S. (2)	Hard (i)	(Netherlands) Jacco Eltingh	(United States) Richey Reneberg (Australia) David Macpherson	7–6, 6–7, 6–2
Win	38.	Mar 1998	Rotterdam, Netherlands (2)	Carpet	(Netherlands) Jacco Eltingh	(United Kingdom) Neil Broad (South Africa) Piet Norval	7–6, 6–3
Win	39.	Apr 1998	Barcelona, Spain (1)	Clay	(Netherlands) Jacco Eltingh	(South Africa) Ellis Ferreira (United States) Rick Leach	7–5, 6–0
Win	40.	Apr 1998	Monte Carlo, Monaco (2)	Clay	(Netherlands) Jacco Eltingh	(Australia) Todd Woodbridge (Australia) Mark Woodforde	6–4, 6–2
Win	41.	Jun 1998	French Open, Paris (2)	Clay	(Netherlands) Jacco Eltingh	(The Bahamas) Mark Knowles (Canada) Daniel Nestor	6–3, 3–6, 6–3
Win	42.	Jul 1998	Wimbledon, London	Grass	(Netherlands) Jacco Eltingh	(Australia) Todd Woodbridge (Australia) Mark Woodforde	2–6, 6–4, 7–6, 5–7, 10–8
Win	43.	Aug 1998	Amsterdam, Netherlands (3)	Clay	(Netherlands) Jacco Eltingh	(Slovakia) Dominik Hrbatý (Slovakia) Karol Kučera	6–3, 6–2
Win	44.	Aug 1998	Boston, U.S. (2)	Hard	(Netherlands) Jacco Eltingh	(South Africa) Chris Haggard (United States) Jack Waite	6–3, 6–2
Loss	24.	Oct 1998	Toulouse, France	Hard (i)	(Netherlands) Jan Siemerink	(France) Olivier Delaître (France) Fabrice Santoro	2–6, 4–6
Loss	25.	Nov 1998	Paris Indoor, France	Carpet	(Netherlands) Jacco Eltingh	(India) Mahesh Bhupathi (India) Leander Paes	4–6, 2–6
Win	45.	Nov 1998	Doubles Championship, Hartford (2)	Carpet	(Netherlands) Jacco Eltingh	(The Bahamas) Mark Knowles (Canada) Daniel Nestor	6–4, 6–2, 7–5
Loss	26.	Jan 1999	Sydney, Australia	Hard	(United States) Patrick Galbraith	(Canada) Sébastien Lareau (Canada) Daniel Nestor	3–6, 4–6
Win	46.	Apr 1999	Barcelona, Spain (2)	Clay	(Russia) Yevgeny Kafelnikov	(Italy) Massimo Bertolini (Italy) Cristian Brandi	7–5, 6–3
Loss	27.	May 1999	Hamburg, Germany	Clay	(United States) Jared Palmer	(Australia) Wayne Arthurs (Australia) Andrew Kratzmann	6–2, 6–7, 2–6
Loss	28.	Jun 1999	Halle, Germany	Grass	(United States) Jared Palmer	(Sweden) Jonas Björkman (Australia) Patrick Rafter	3–6, 5–7
Loss	29.	Jul 1999	Wimbledon, London	Grass	(United States) Jared Palmer	(India) Mahesh Bhupathi (India) Leander Paes	7–6, 3–6, 4–6, 6–7
Win	47.	Aug 1999	Amsterdam, Netherlands (4)	Clay	(Netherlands) Sjeng Schalken	(United States) Devin Bowen (Israel) Eyal Ran	6–3, 6–2
Win	48.	Aug 1999	Indianapolis, U.S.	Hard	(United States) Jared Palmer	(France) Olivier Delaître (India) Leander Paes	6–3, 6–4
Loss	30.	Nov 1999	Paris Indoor, France	Carpet	(United States) Jared Palmer	(Canada) Sébastien Lareau (United States) Alex O'Brien	6–7, 5–7
Loss	31.	Mar 2000	Indian Wells, U.S.	Hard	(Australia) Sandon Stolle	(United States) Alex O'Brien (United States) Jared Palmer	4–6, 6–7
Loss	32.	Apr 2000	Monte Carlo, Monaco	Clay	(Australia) Sandon Stolle	(South Africa) Wayne Ferreira (Russia) Yevgeny Kafelnikov	3–6, 6–2, 1–6
Loss	33.	May 2000	Barcelona, Spain	Clay	(Australia) Sandon Stolle	(Sweden) Nicklas Kulti (Sweden) Mikael Tillström	2–6, 7–6, 6–7
Loss	34.	Jun 2000	French Open, Paris	Clay	(Australia) Sandon Stolle	(Australia) Todd Woodbridge (Australia) Mark Woodforde	6–7, 4–6
Loss	35.	Jun 2000	s'Hertogenbosch, Netherlands	Grass	(Australia) Sandon Stolle	(Czech Republic) Martin Damm (Czech Republic) Cyril Suk	4–6, 7–6, 6–7
Loss	36.	Jul 2000	Wimbledon, London	Grass	(Australia) Sandon Stolle	(Australia) Todd Woodbridge (Australia) Mark Woodforde	3–6, 4–6, 1–6
Win	49.	Oct 2000	Shanghai, China	Hard	(Netherlands) Sjeng Schalken	(Czech Republic) Petr Pála (Czech Republic) Pavel Vízner	6–2, 3–6, 6–4
Win	50.	Nov 2000	Lyon, France	Carpet	(Australia) Sandon Stolle	(Croatia) Ivan Ljubičić (United States) Jack Waite	6–1, 6–7, 7–6
Loss	37.	Nov 2000	Paris Indoor, France	Carpet	(Canada) Daniel Nestor	(Sweden) Nicklas Kulti (Belarus) Max Mirnyi	4–6, 5–7
Win	51.	Feb 2001	Milan, Italy	Carpet	(Netherlands) Sjeng Schalken	(Sweden) Johan Landsberg (Belgium) Tom Vanhoudt	7–6^{(5)}, 7–6^{(4)}
Win	52.	Jun 2001	s’Hertogenbosch, Netherlands (3)	Grass	(Netherlands) Sjeng Schalken	(Czech Republic) Martin Damm (Czech Republic) Cyril Suk	6–4, 6–4
Win	53.	Jul 2001	Amsterdam, Netherlands (5)	Clay	(Netherlands) Sjeng Schalken	(Spain) Àlex Corretja (Argentina) Luis Lobo	6–4, 6–2
Loss	38.	Apr 2002	Monte Carlo, Monaco	Clay	(Russia) Yevgeny Kafelnikov	(Sweden) Jonas Björkman (Australia) Todd Woodbridge	3–6, 6–3, [7–10]
Win	54.	Jun 2002	French Open, Paris (3)	Clay	(Russia) Yevgeny Kafelnikov	(The Bahamas) Mark Knowles (Canada) Daniel Nestor	7–5, 6–4
Loss	39.	Jun 2002	s'Hertogenbosch, Netherlands	Grass	(United States) Brian MacPhie	(Czech Republic) Martin Damm (Czech Republic) Cyril Suk	6–7, 7–6, 4–6
Loss	40.	Jun 2003	French Open, Paris	Clay	(Russia) Yevgeny Kafelnikov	(United States) Bob Bryan (United States) Mike Bryan	6–7, 3–6

== Performance timelines ==
Key
W	F	SF	QF	#R	RR	Q#	DNQ	A	NH

(W) winner; (F) finalist; (SF) semifinalist; (QF) quarterfinalist; (#R) rounds 4, 3, 2, 1; (RR) round-robin stage; (Q#) qualification round; (DNQ) did not qualify; (A) absent; (NH) not held; (SR) strike rate (events won / competed); (W–L) win–loss record.

=== Doubles ===
Tournament	1988	1989	1990	1991	1992	1993	1994	1995	1996	1997	1998	1999	2000	2001	2002	2003	SR	W–L
Grand Slam tournaments
Australian Open	A	A	2R	3R	1R	3R	W	SF	3R	SF	A	QF	A	A	A	A	1 / 9	24–8
French Open	A	1R	SF	QF	1R	3R	QF	W	2R	SF	W	2R	F	A	W	F	3 / 14	46–11
Wimbledon	A	A	1R	3R	QF	A	QF	QF	1R	F	W	F	F	A	3R	3R	1 / 12	36–10
US Open	A	1R	1R	2R	QF	2R	W	3R	F	2R	A	1R	QF	SF	3R	A	1 / 13	28–12
Grand Slam SR	0 / 0	0 / 2	0 / 4	0 / 4	0 / 4	0 / 3	2 / 4	1 / 4	0 / 4	0 / 4	2 / 2	0 / 4	0 / 3	0 / 1	1 / 3	0 / 2	6 / 48	N/A
Annual win–loss	0–0	0–2	5–4	8–4	6–4	5–3	18–2	15–3	8–4	14–4	12–0	9–4	13–3	4–1	10–2	7–1	N/A	134–41
Year-end championships
Doubles Championships	A	A	A	A	A	W	SF	F	RR	SF	W	RR	RR	A	NH	A	2 / 8	22–10
ATP Masters Series
Indian Wells	NME		A	A	A	A	A	A	QF	1R	A	QF	F	2R	A	A	0 / 5	8–5
Key Biscayne	NME		A	3R	1R	QF	W	QF	A	3R	A	2R	QF	2R	A	A	1 / 9	15–8
Monte Carlo	NME		SF	F	2R	F	2R	W	QF	F	W	1R	F	2R	F	QF	2 / 14	35–11
Rome	NME		2R	1R	2R	W	2R	1R	2R	2R	A	A	QF	A	A	A	1 / 9	12–8
Hamburg	NME		1R	A	1R	W	SF	SF	2R	QF	A	F	A	A	A	A	1 / 8	14–7
Montreal / Toronto	NME		A	A	A	A	A	A	W	A	A	A	A	A	A	A	1 / 1	4–0
Cincinnati	NME		A	A	A	A	A	A	A	A	2R	A	A	A	A	A	0 / 1	0–1
Madrid (Stuttgart)	NME		A	A	2R	A	A	W	F	SF	QF	2R	2R	2R	A	A	1 / 8	12–7
Paris	NME		A	A	1R	SF	W	QF	W	W	F	F	F	2R	A	A	3 / 10	24–7
Masters Series SR	N/A		0 / 3	0 / 3	0 / 6	2 / 5	2 / 5	2 / 6	2 / 7	1 / 7	1 / 4	0 / 6	0 / 6	0 / 5	0 / 1	0 / 1	10 / 65	N/A
Annual win–loss	N/A		4–3	5–3	3–6	17–3	13–3	13–4	16–5	12–6	8–3	9–6	15–6	4–4	4–1	1–1	N/A	124–54
Year-end ranking	477	87	34	17	34	4	1	3	6	3	2	5	4	39	22	46	N/A	

=== Singles ===
Tournament	1987	1988	1989	1990	1991	1992	1993	1994	1995	1996	1997	1998	1999	SR	W–L
Grand Slam tournaments
Australian Open	A	A	A	1R	2R	2R	1R	3R	1R	1R	1R	A	2R	0 / 9	5–9
French Open	A	A	3R	3R	3R	1R	4R	3R	1R	3R	1R	1R	1R	0 / 11	13–11
Wimbledon	A	A	A	3R	1R	2R	1R	1R	2R	4R	3R	1R	3R	0 / 10	11–10
US Open	A	A	4R	1R	QF	2R	2R	1R	2R	3R	2R	3R	2R	0 / 11	16–11
Win–loss	0–0	0–0	5–2	4–4	7–4	3–4	4–4	4–4	2–4	7–4	3–4	2–3	4–4	0 / 41	45–41
ATP Masters Series
Indian Wells	NME			A	A	A	A	A	A	F	1R	A	2R	0 / 3	6–3
Miami	NME			A	3R	3R	3R	4R	2R	2R	1R	3R	2R	0 / 9	10–9
Monte Carlo	NME			1R	2R	1R	2R	2R	3R	1R	1R	A	A	0 / 8	5–8
Hamburg	NME			2R	2R	QF	1R	3R	1R	1R	2R	A	1R	0 / 9	8–9
Rome	NME			3R	2R	2R	2R	1R	1R	2R	2R	A	A	0 / 8	7–8
Canada	NME			A	A	A	A	A	A	1R	A	A	A	0 / 1	0–1
Cincinnati	NME			A	A	A	A	A	A	A	A	A	A	0 / 0	0–0
Stockholm / Essen / Stuttgart	NME			A	A	1R	A	A	1R	1R	3R	1R	A	0 / 5	2–5
Paris	NME			A	A	1R	A	2R	3R	QF	A	1R	A	0 / 5	6–5
Win–loss	N/A			3–3	5–4	5–6	4–4	6–5	4–6	9–8	4–6	2–3	2–3	0 / 48	44–48
Year-end ranking	397	462	57	54	37	39	42	37	19	25	70	74	178		

== Senior Tour titles ==
- 2007 – defeated Jim Courier 6–1, 6–4 in The Legends Rock Dubai
