= Younes El Aynaoui =

Moroccan tennis player

Younes El Aynaoui يونس العيناوي
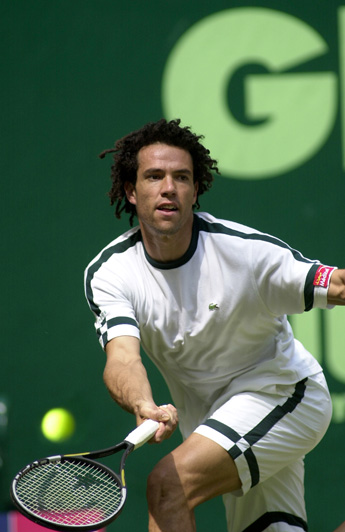
- Country (sports): Morocco
- Residence: Rabat, Morocco
- Born: 12 September 1971 (age 54) Rabat, Morocco
- Height: 1.93 m (6 ft 4 in)
- Turned pro: 1990
- Retired: 2017
- Plays: Right-handed (two-handed backhand)
- Prize money: $4,044,667

Singles
- Career record: 265–227
- Career titles: 5
- Highest ranking: No. 14 (11 March 2003)

Grand Slam singles results
- Australian Open: QF (2000, 2003)
- French Open: 4R (1995, 2000)
- Wimbledon: 3R (2000, 2001, 2003)
- US Open: QF (2002, 2003)

Other tournaments
- Olympic Games: 2R (1992)

Doubles
- Career record: 24–56
- Career titles: 0
- Highest ranking: No. 85 (14 July 2003)
- Last updated on: 31 March 2018.

Younes El Aynaoui (Arabic: يونس العيناوي) (born 12 September 1971) is a Moroccan coach and former professional tennis player.

He is a five-time singles winner on the ATP Tour and reached his career-high singles ranking of world No. 14 in March 2003, at the age of 31. His long career was plagued by injuries and he did not play competitive tennis between September 2008 and January 2010. However, in December 2009 he scheduled to play at the ATP Champions Tour tournament in London, where he made his debut at the senior tour.

He received a gold medal – the nation's highest sporting honour – from King Mohammed VI. In a 2003 poll by leading Moroccan newspaper L'Economiste, readers named El Aynaoui their favourite role model for society, ahead of athletics star Hicham El Guerrouj.

He is currently coaching Hugo Gaston.

== Tennis career ==
=== At the Bollettieri Academy ===
In 1990, at the age of 18, El Aynaoui traveled to Bradenton, Florida, United States, to spend a week at the Nick Bollettieri Tennis Academy, after which he decided to turn professional. He continued to hone his skills at the academy for the next two years where, in order to afford the fees, he drove the academy bus, cleaned the gym, strung rackets, tossed practice balls to campers, and helped to babysit younger players.

=== First ATP singles final ===
In 1993, he reached his first top-level Grand Prix singles final in Casablanca, where he lost to the Argentinian player Guillermo Pérez Roldán.

=== 1996 to 1998 ===
After finishing runner-up in three tour events in 1996, El Aynaoui suffered a broken right ankle. He had surgery on his ankle in November that year, but the injury continued to cause him problems. He missed seven months of the season in 1997 and had a second surgery in February 1998. He returned to the tour that summer ranked World Number 444, and enjoyed a run of strong results. He won five Challenger series tournaments and finished runner-up at one top-level event in Santiago. By the end of the year he had improved his ranking to World Number 49, and was named the ATP Comeback Player of the Year for 1998.

=== 1999 to 2003 ===
In 1999, El Aynaoui won his first top-level singles title in Amsterdam and the following year he reached the quarter-finals of the Australian Open where he lost to Yevgeny Kafelnikov. El Aynaoui won his second top-level title in 2001 at Bucharest. He was runner-up in Amsterdam that year, losing in the final to Àlex Corretja in a five-set, 53-game match (6–3, 5–7, 7–6, 3–6, 6–4) which was the year's longest tour final. He was also runner-up in Lyon, defeated by Ivan Ljubičić in final.

El Aynaoui captured two tour titles in 2002 (Doha and Munich), and reached the quarter-finals of the US Open. The following year, he reached the quarter-finals of the Australian and US Opens and finished the season ranked a career-high World Number 14.

=== Longest Grand Slam fifth set ===
In the Round of 16 of the 2003 Australian Open, El Aynaoui defeated the World No. 1, Lleyton Hewitt, 6–7, 7–6, 7–6, 6–4, thus setting up a quarter-final showdown with the up-and-coming American Andy Roddick (who would reach the World No. 1 ranking later that year). The five-set, five-hour match included the then longest fifth set in Grand Slam tennis history (since surpassed by the marathon Wimbledon 2010 match between John Isner and Nicolas Mahut). Roddick won the battle 4–6, 7–6, 4–6, 6–4, 21–19. Both players saved match points before the fifth set ended. El Aynaoui's one match point came in the tenth game of the fifth set, with Roddick serving at 4–5. Roddick saved the match point with a cross-court forehand winner after a short rally. Roddick broke El Aynaoui's serve at 10–10 to go up 11–10 and serve for the match, but El Aynaoui broke straight back for 11–11. Roddick broke El Aynaoui's serve again at 19–19 to serve for the match for the second time at 20–19, with Roddick clinching the match on his second match point.

=== Return to ATP Tour in 2007 ===
After a three-year hiatus due to injury, El Aynaoui made a comeback to the ATP tour in January 2007, and was awarded a wildcard at the Qatar Open, Doha. He beat former Australian Open winner Thomas Johansson with two tie-breaks in the first round, but was defeated 6–3, 6–4 in the second round by the then World Number 5 and eventual winner Ivan Ljubičić.

=== Another comeback attempt in 2008 ===
In March 2008, after a seven-month lay-off due to injuries, he won a Futures event in Castelldefels, Spain on clay, and in April he won a challenger event in Chiasso, Switzerland. In May, he reached the semi-finals of the BMW Open in Munich. He was oldest player to reach the semi-finals of an ATP Tour level event since Jimmy Connors in 1993. He also reached the quarter-finals of the Casablanca Open in Morocco, retiring to Juan Mónaco due to an injury in his left calf.

=== ATP Champions Tour (2009) ===
El Aynaoui made his debut as a wild card at the senior tour in London, the last stop on the tour, joining Stefan Edberg, Pat Rafter, Cédric Pioline, Pat Cash, Goran Ivanišević, Mark Philippoussis and Greg Rusedski. He won two matches, against Rusedski and Philippoussis.

=== 2010 Comeback ===
In the 2010 Qatar ExxonMobil Open in Doha, Qatar, El Aynaoui received a wildcard to participate in the tournament.

He played American Ryler DeHeart in the first round of this tournament and won 7–6, 7–6, thus becoming at age 38 the oldest player to win a main tour ATP match since Jimmy Connors in 1995. However, El Aynaoui's run came to an end when he was defeated 6–3, 6–1 by Belgian Steve Darcis.

=== 2017 Record for oldest player with ATP ranking ===
In March 2017, at the age of 45, El Aynaoui participated in a US$15,000 tournament in Manama, Bahrain on the ITF Men's Circuit. El Aynaoui won two qualifying matches, as well as his first-round match in the main draw. By doing so, he became the oldest player to have an ATP ranking.

El Aynaoui also contested the doubles draw in Manama, and Koksijde, Belgium.

== Personal life ==
El Aynaoui's son, Neil El Aynaoui, is a professional football player who represents Serie A club AS Roma and the Morocco national football team.

== Career finals ==
=== Singles (5 wins, 11 losses) ===
Legend (singles)
Grand Slam (0)
Tennis Masters Cup (0)
ATP Masters Series (0)
ATP Tour (5)

| Result | W/L | Date | Tournament | Surface | Opponent | Score |
|---|---|---|---|---|---|---|
| Loss | 0–1 | Mar 1993 | Casablanca, Morocco | Clay | (Argentina) Guillermo Pérez Roldán | 4–6, 3–6 |
| Loss | 0–2 | Jan 1996 | Doha, Qatar | Hard | (Czech Republic) Petr Korda | 6–7^{(5–7)}, 6–2, 6–7^{(5–7)} |
| Loss | 0–3 | Jan 1996 | Jakarta, Indonesia | Hard | (Netherlands) Sjeng Schalken | 3–6, 2–6 |
| Loss | 0–4 | Aug 1996 | Amsterdam, Netherlands | Clay | (Spain) Francisco Clavet | 5–7, 1–6, 1–6 |
| Loss | 0–5 | Nov 1998 | Santiago, Chile | Clay | (Spain) Francisco Clavet | 2–6, 4–6 |
| Win | 1–5 | Aug 1999 | Amsterdam, Netherlands | Clay | (Argentina) Mariano Zabaleta | 6–0, 6–3 |
| Loss | 1–6 | Mar 2000 | Bogotá, Colombia | Clay | (Argentina) Mariano Puerta | 4–6, 6–7^{(5–7)} |
| Loss | 1–7 | Jul 2001 | Amsterdam, Netherlands | Clay | (Spain) Àlex Corretja | 3–6, 7–5, 6–7^{(0–7)}, 6–3, 4–6 |
| Win | 2–7 | Sep 2001 | Bucharest, Romania | Clay | (Spain) Albert Montañés | 7–6^{(7–5)}, 7–6^{(7–2)} |
| Loss | 2–8 | Oct 2001 | Lyon, France | Carpet | (Croatia) Ivan Ljubičić | 3–6, 2–6 |
| Win | 3–8 | Dec 2001 | Doha, Qatar | Hard | (Spain) Félix Mantilla | 4–6, 6–2, 6–2 |
| Loss | 3–9 | Feb 2002 | Dubai, UAE | Hard | (France) Fabrice Santoro | 4–6, 6–3, 3–6 |
| Win | 4–9 | Apr 2002 | Casablanca, Morocco | Clay | (Argentina) Guillermo Cañas | 3–6, 6–3, 6–2 |
| Win | 5–9 | Apr 2002 | Munich, Germany | Clay | (Germany) Rainer Schüttler | 6–4, 6–4 |
| Loss | 5–10 | Jun 2002 | Båstad, Sweden | Clay | (Spain) Carlos Moyá | 3–6, 6–2, 5–7 |
| Loss | 5–11 | Mar 2003 | Casablanca, Morocco | Clay | (France) Julien Boutter | 2–6, 6–2, 1–6 |

== Singles performance timeline ==
Key
| W | F | SF | QF | #R | RR | Q# | DNQ | A | NH |

(W) winner; (F) finalist; (SF) semifinalist; (QF) quarterfinalist; (#R) rounds 4, 3, 2, 1; (RR) round-robin stage; (Q#) qualification round; (DNQ) did not qualify; (A) absent; (NH) not held; (SR) strike rate (events won / competed); (W–L) win–loss record.

| Tournament | 1993 | 1994 | 1995 | 1996 | 1997 | 1998 | 1999 | 2000 | 2001 | 2002 | 2003 | 2004 | 2005 | 2006 | 2007 | SR | W–L |
|---|---|---|---|---|---|---|---|---|---|---|---|---|---|---|---|---|---|
Grand Slam tournaments
| Australian Open | Q1 | 2R | 1R | A | A | A | 2R | QF | 1R | 3R | QF | 1R | A | A | A | 0 / 8 | 12–8 |
| French Open | A | 1R | 4R | 1R | A | Q3 | 2R | 4R | 2R | 2R | 3R | A | A | A | Q2 | 0 / 8 | 11–8 |
| Wimbledon | A | 1R | A | 1R | A | A | 2R | 3R | 3R | 1R | 3R | A | A | A | A | 0 / 7 | 7–7 |
| US Open | A | 1R | A | 1R | A | A | 2R | 1R | 1R | QF | QF | 1R | 1R | Q1 | A | 0 / 9 | 9–9 |
| Win–loss | 0–0 | 1–4 | 3–2 | 0–3 | 0–0 | 0–0 | 4–4 | 9–4 | 3–4 | 7–4 | 12–4 | 0–2 | 0–1 | 0–0 | 0–0 | 0 / 32 | 39–32 |
ATP Masters Series
| Indian Wells | A | A | A | 1R | A | A | A | 1R | 1R | 1R | 1R | A | A | A | A | 0 / 5 | 0–5 |
| Miami | A | A | A | A | A | A | 1R | 2R | 2R | 2R | QF | A | 1R | A | A | 0 / 6 | 4–6 |
| Monte Carlo | Q3 | 1R | Q3 | A | A | A | 1R | 1R | 1R | 2R | 1R | A | 1R | A | A | 0 / 7 | 1–7 |
| Hamburg | A | A | A | A | A | A | 1R | 3R | 1R | 3R | 1R | A | A | A | A | 0 / 5 | 4–5 |
| Rome | Q2 | 1R | A | 1R | A | A | 1R | 3R | A | 1R | 1R | A | 1R | A | A | 0 / 7 | 2–6 |
| Canada | A | A | A | A | A | A | A | A | A | 2R | 2R | A | 2R | A | A | 0 / 3 | 3–3 |
| Cincinnati | A | A | A | A | A | A | A | A | A | 1R | 2R | 1R | 1R | A | A | 0 / 4 | 1–4 |
| Madrid | A | A | A | A | A | A | 1R | 3R | A | 2R | SF | A | A | A | A | 0 / 4 | 5–4 |
| Paris | A | A | Q1 | A | A | A | 2R | A | A | 1R | 2R | A | Q2 | A | A | 0 / 3 | 1–3 |
| Win–loss | 0–0 | 0–2 | 0–0 | 0–2 | 0–0 | 0–0 | 1–6 | 6–5 | 1–4 | 4–9 | 8–9 | 0–1 | 1–5 | 0–0 | 0–0 | 0 / 44 | 21–43 |
Career statistics
| Titles | 0 | 0 | 0 | 0 | 0 | 0 | 1 | 0 | 1 | 3 | 0 | 0 | 0 | 0 | 0 | 5 | |
| Finals | 1 | 0 | 0 | 3 | 0 | 1 | 1 | 1 | 3 | 5 | 1 | 0 | 0 | 0 | 0 | 16 | |
| Year-end ranking | 51 | 117 | 110 | 70 | 237 | 45 | 33 | 25 | 38 | 22 | 14 | 644 | 228 | 189 | 167 | | |

== Top 10 wins ==
| Season | 1990 | 1991 | 1992 | 1993 | 1994 | 1995 | 1996 | 1997 | 1998 | 1999 | 2000 | 2001 | 2002 | 2003 | 2004 | 2005 | 2006 | 2007 | 2008 | 2009 | 2010 | Total |
| Wins | 0 | 0 | 0 | 1 | 0 | 0 | 3 | 0 | 0 | 2 | 0 | 2 | 3 | 5 | 0 | 0 | 0 | 0 | 0 | 0 | 0 | 16 |

| # | Player | Rank | Event | Surface | Rd | Score | EAR |
1993
| 1. | (Spain) Sergi Bruguera | 4 | Toulouse, France | Hard (i) | 2R | 6–4, 3–6, 7–6^{(7–2)} | 76 |
1996
| 2. | (Sweden) Thomas Enqvist | 7 | Doha, Qatar | Hard | 2R | 3–6, 6–3, 6–4 | 110 |
| 3. | (Austria) Thomas Muster | 3 | Doha, Qatar | Hard | SF | 6–4, 6–4 | 110 |
| 4. | (South Africa) Wayne Ferreira | 6 | Lyon, France | Carpet (i) | 1R | 5–7, 6–4, 6–4 | 65 |
1999
| 5. | (Spain) Àlex Corretja | 5 | Barcelona, Spain | Clay | 2R | 7–6^{(7–3)}, 6–3 | 41 |
| 6. | (Chile) Marcelo Ríos | 9 | Gstaad, Switzerland | Clay | 2R | 7–6^{(7–5)}, 7–6^{(7–5)} | 33 |
2001
| 7. | (Australia) Lleyton Hewitt | 4 | Indianapolis, United States | Hard | 3R | 6–3, 6–7^{(1–7)}, 6–3 | 49 |
| 8. | (Spain) Juan Carlos Ferrero | 5 | Lyon, France | Carpet (i) | QF | 6–4, 6–4 | 40 |
2002
| 9. | (Spain) Juan Carlos Ferrero | 3 | Davis Cup, Zaragoza, Spain | Clay (i) | RR | 7–6^{(7–2)}, 6–0, 3–6, 0–6, 6–3 | 20 |
| 10. | (Spain) Juan Carlos Ferrero | 3 | Dubai, United Arab Emirates | Hard | 2R | 7–5, 4–6, 2–1, ret. | 21 |
| 11. | (Sweden) Thomas Johansson | 10 | Dubai, United Arab Emirates | Hard | SF | 7–6^{(7–5)}, 4–6, 6–3 | 21 |
2003
| 12. | (Australia) Lleyton Hewitt | 1 | Australian Open, Melbourne, Australia | Hard | 4R | 6–7^{(4–7)}, 7–6^{(7–4)}, 7–6^{(7–5)}, 6–4 | 22 |
| 13. | (Argentina) David Nalbandian | 10 | Miami, United States | Hard | 3R | 6–3, 4–6, 6–4 | 21 |
| 14. | (Czech Republic) Jiří Novák | 10 | US Open, New York, United States | Hard | 3R | 7–6^{(7–1)}, 5–7, 3–6, 6–3, 7–6^{(7–5)} | 21 |
| 15. | (Spain) Carlos Moyá | 7 | US Open, New York, United States | Hard | 4R | 7–6^{(7–4)}, 7–6^{(9–7)}, 4–6, 6–4 | 21 |
| 16. | (France) Sébastien Grosjean | 10 | Madrid, Spain | Hard (i) | QF | 3–6, 7–6^{(8–6)}, 6–2 | 18 |
