= NECC–ITF Women's Tennis Championships =

Tournament information
- Location: Pune, Maharashtra; India
- Venue: Deccan Gymkhana Club
- Category: ITF Women's Circuit
- Surface: Deco Turf (Hard)
- Draw: 32M/16Q/16D
- Prize money: US$ 25,000

The NECC–ITF Women's Tennis Tournament (named after sponsor National Egg Coordination Committee (NECC)) is a tennis tournament on the ITF Women's Circuit, under the tier of the WTA Tour, played on outdoor hardcourts. It has been held annually at the Deccan Gymkhana Club in Pune, India since 2001.

== History ==
It is held yearly since 2001 in Pune, Maharashtra, India. It was a $10,000 event from 2001 to 2005, and was upgraded to $25,000 in 2006–2008. In 2009, it was a $50,000. Since 2010, it has been a $25,000 event. Akgul Amanmuradova has been the most successful at the event, winning two titles.

== Results ==
=== Singles ===
Year	Champion	Runner-up	Score
2025	Tatiana Prozorova	(France) Léolia Jeanjean	4–6, 7–5, 6–3
2024	(Japan) Moyuka Uchijima	(Australia) Tina Nadine Smith	6–4, 6–0
2023	(Germany) Tatjana Maria	(Uzbekistan) Nigina Abduraimova	6–1, 6–1
2022	not held		
2021	(Japan) Moyuka Uchijima	(Latvia) Diāna Marcinkēviča	6–2, 7–5
2020	not held due to the COVID-19 pandemic		
2019	(United Kingdom) Emma Raducanu	(United Kingdom) Naiktha Bains	3–6, 6–1, 6–4
2018	(Russia) Valeria Savinykh	(China) Lu Jiajing	3–6, 6–2, 7–6^{(9–7)}
2017	(Spain) Georgina García Pérez	(United Kingdom) Katy Dunne	6–4, 7–5
2016	(Slovenia) Tamara Zidanšek	(Russia) Polina Monova	6–4, 6–2
2015	(Belarus) Aryna Sabalenka	(Russia) Viktoria Kamenskaya	6–3, 6–4
2014	(India) Ankita Raina	(United Kingdom) Katy Dunne	6–2, 6–2
2013	(Poland) Magda Linette	(Kazakhstan) Kamila Kerimbayeva	7–5, 7–6^{(7–5)}
2012	(Slovenia) Tadeja Majerič	(Turkey) Başak Eraydın	6–2, 6–4
2011	(France) Céline Cattaneo	(Ukraine) Anna Shkudun	2–6, 7–5, 6–3
2010	(Serbia) Bojana Jovanovski	(Russia) Nina Bratchikova	6–4, 6–4
2009	(Japan) Rika Fujiwara	(Serbia) Bojana Jovanovski	5–7, 6–4, 6–3
2008	(China) Lu Jingjing	(United Kingdom) Melanie South	6–3, 6–1
2007	(Indonesia) Sandy Gumulya	(India) Isha Lakhani	6–3, 7–5
2006	(Thailand) Nungnadda Wannasuk	(Kazakhstan) Amina Rakhim	3–6, 6–3, 6–2
2005	(United Kingdom) Naomi Cavaday	(India) Isha Lakhani	6–4, 6–1
2004	(Uzbekistan) Akgul Amanmuradova	(India) Rushmi Chakravarthi	6–0, 7–6^{(7–5)}
2003	(Uzbekistan) Akgul Amanmuradova	(India) Meghha Vakaria	7–5, 6–3
2002	(Ukraine) Kateryna Bondarenko	(Turkey) İpek Şenoğlu	6–1, 6–1
2001	(India) Radhika Tulpule	(India) Archana Venkataraman	4–6, 6–3, 7–6^{(9–7)}

=== Doubles ===
Year	Champions	Runners-up	Score
2021	(Kazakhstan) Anna Danilina (Ukraine) Valeriya Strakhova	(Japan) Funa Kozaki (Japan) Misaki Matsuda	6–0, 2–6, [10–5]
2020	not held due to the COVID-19 pandemic		
2019	(Norway) Ulrikke Eikeri (Russia) Ekaterina Yashina	(Russia) Daria Mishina (Russia) Anna Morgina	1–6, 6–3, [10–5]
2018	(Indonesia) Beatrice Gumulya (Montenegro) Ana Veselinović	(Canada) Sharon Fichman (Russia) Valeria Savinykh	7–6^{(7–4)}, 1–6, [11–9]
2017	(Indonesia) Jessy Rompies (Thailand) Varunya Wongteanchai	(United Kingdom) Samantha Murray (Montenegro) Ana Veselinović	6–4, 6–2
2016	(Indonesia) Beatrice Gumulya (Montenegro) Ana Veselinović	(Thailand) Kamonwan Buayam (United Kingdom) Katy Dunne	6–4, 6–3
2015	(Russia) Valentyna Ivakhnenko (Ukraine) Anastasiya Vasylyeva	(Chinese Taipei) Hsu Chieh-yu (India) Prarthana Thombare	4–6, 6–2, [12–10]
2014	(Russia) Anna Morgina (Serbia) Nina Stojanović	(Georgia (country)) Oksana Kalashnikova (Ukraine) Anastasiya Vasylyeva	7–6^{(9–7)}, 6–4
2013	(Thailand) Nicha Lertpitaksinchai (Thailand) Peangtarn Plipuech	(United Kingdom) Jocelyn Rae (United Kingdom) Anna Smith	7–5, 7–5
2012	(Slovenia) Tadeja Majerič (Switzerland) Conny Perrin	(China) Lu Jiaxiang (China) Lu Jiajing	3–6, 7–5, [10–6]
2011	(China) Lu Jiaxiang (China) Lu Jiajing	(Thailand) Varatchaya Wongteanchai (Thailand) Varunya Wongteanchai	6–1, 6–3
2010	(Russia) Nina Bratchikova (Russia) Alexandra Panova	(Japan) Sachie Ishizu (Ukraine) Anna Shkudun	6–3, 7–6^{(7–2)}
2009	(Italy) Nicole Clerico (Ukraine) Anastasiya Vasylyeva	(Russia) Nina Bratchikova (Kyrgyzstan) Ksenia Palkina	4–6, 6–3, [13–11]
2008	(Chinese Taipei) Chang Kai-chen (Chinese Taipei) Hwang I-hsuan	(Romania) Elora Dabija (Serbia) Bojana Jovanovski	5–7, 6–2, [10–7]
2007	(Thailand) Varatchaya Wongteanchai (Hong Kong) Zhang Ling	(Indonesia) Wynne Prakusya (Indonesia) Angelique Widjaja	1–6, 7–5, [10–5]
2006	(India) Isha Lakhani (Kyrgyzstan) Ksenia Palkina	(India) Madura Ranganathan (Thailand) Nungnadda Wannasuk	6–3, 4–6, 6–4
2005	(Italy) Nicole Clerico (Kyrgyzstan) Ksenia Palkina	(India) Rushmi Chakravarthi (India) Sai Jayalakshmy Jayaram	7–5, 7–6^{(9–7)}
2004	(Uzbekistan) Akgul Amanmuradova (India) Sai Jayalakshmy Jayaram	(Thailand) Wilawan Choptang (Thailand) Thassha Vitayaviroj	6–3, 4–6, 6–3
2003	(Thailand) Montinee Tangphong (Thailand) Thassha Vitayaviroj	(India) Geeta Manohar (India) Archana Venkataraman	4–6, 7–5, 6–4
2002	(Uzbekistan) Akgul Amanmuradova (Ukraine) Kateryna Bondarenko	(India) Sania Mirza (India) Radhika Tulpule	6–3, 7–6^{(7–1)}
2001	(India) Rushmi Chakravarthi (India) Sai Jayalakshmy Jayaram	(India) Sania Mirza (India) Sonal Phadke	6–2, 6–0
