= Gumulya =

Gumulya is an Indonesian surname. Notable people with the surname include:

- Sandy Gumulya (b. 1986), Indonesian tennis player, sister of Beatrice
- Beatrice Gumulya (b. 1991), Indonesian tennis player, sister of Sandy
