= Tulpule =

Tulpule is a surname. People with the surname include:

- Radhika Tulpule
- Kavita Paudwal Tulpule
