= Shruti Dhawan =

Indian tennis player

- Country (sports): India
- Born: 28 March 1982 (age 43) New Delhi, India
- Retired: 2006
- Prize money: $23,317

Singles
- Career record: 59–80
- Career titles: 2 ITF
- Highest ranking: No. 454 (30 July 2001)

Doubles
- Career record: 77–81
- Career titles: 8 ITF
- Highest ranking: No. 429 (20 October 2003)

Team competitions
- Fed Cup: 0–2

Shruti Dhawan (born 28 March 1982) is an Indian former professional tennis player.

Dhawan has a career-high singles ranking by the WTA of 454, achieved on 30 July 2001. She also has a career-high WTA doubles ranking of 429, achieved on 20 October 2003. She won two singles and eight doubles titles on the ITF Women's Circuit.

Playing for India Fed Cup team, Dhawan has a win–loss record of 0–2.

== ITF finals ==
=== Singles: 7 (2–5) ===
Outcome	No.	Date	Location	Surface	Opponent	Score
Winner	1.	2 November 1998	Ahmedabad, India	Hard	(India) Sai Jayalakshmy Jayaram	7–5, 6–3
Winner	2.	30 April 1999	Mumbai, India	Hard	(India) Rushmi Chakravarthi	3–6, 6–0, 6–0
Runner-up	3.	6 May 1999	Mumbai, India	Hard	(Russia) Anna Nefedova	6–2, 2–6, 0–6
Runner-up	4.	9 September 2001	New Delhi, India	Hard	(India) Rushmi Chakravarthi	4–6, 7–5, 4–6
Runner-up	5.	3 June 2002	Mumbai, India	Carpet	(India) Sheethal Goutham	2–6, 4–6
Runner-up	6.	8 June 2002	Mumbai, India	Carpet	(India) Sheethal Goutham	4–6, 0–6
Runner-up	7.	5 May 2003	New Delhi, India	Hard	(India) Isha Lakhani	3–6, 4–6

=== Doubles: 18 (8–10) ===
Outcome	No.	Date	Location	Surface	Partner	Opponents	Score
Winner	1.	26 October 1998	Ahmedabad, India	Hard	(India) Sheethal Goutham	(India) Rushmi Chakravarthi (India) Sai Jayalakshmy Jayaram	6–4, 6–4
Runner-up	2.	17 April 1999	Mumbai, India	Hard	(India) Sheethal Goutham	(India) Rushmi Chakravarthi (India) Sai Jayalakshmy Jayaram	7–5, 0–6, 3–6
Runner-up	3.	30 April 1999	Mumbai, India	Hard	(India) Sheethal Goutham	(India) Rushmi Chakravarthi (India) Sai Jayalakshmy Jayaram	5–7, 2–6
Winner	4.	10 May 1999	Mumbai, India	Hard	(India) Sheethal Goutham	(India) Rushmi Chakravarthi (India) Sai Jayalakshmy Jayaram	1–0 ret.
Runner-up	5.	19 September 2001	New Delhi, India	Hard	(India) Radhika Tulpule	(India) Rushmi Chakravarthi (India) Sai Jayalakshmy Jayaram	7–6^{(5)}, 4–6, 4–6
Runner-up	6.	27 May 2002	Mumbai, India	Carpet	(India) Sheethal Goutham	(India) Liza Pereira Viplav (India) Radhika Tulpule	6–7^{(6)}, 4–6
Winner	7.	21 June 2002	Mumbai, India	Carpet	(India) Sheethal Goutham	(India) Archana Venkataraman (India) Arthi Venkataraman	7–5, 6–0
Winner	8.	26 June 2002	Mumbai, India	Clay	(India) Sheethal Goutham	(India) Ankita Bhambri (India) Sonal Phadke	6–3, 2–6, 6–3
Winner	9.	1 July 2002	Mumbai, India	Carpet	(India) Sheethal Goutham	(India) Liza Pereira Viplav (India) Radhika Tulpule	6–1, 6–2
Runner-up	10.	16 September 2002	Hyderabad, India	Hard	(India) Sheethal Goutham	(Thailand) Wilawan Choptang (Malaysia) Khoo Chin-bee	2–6, 2–6
Runner-up	11.	20 April 2003	Muzaffarnagar, India	Grass	(Israel) Yael Glitzenstein	(India) Rushmi Chakravarthi (India) Sai Jayalakshmy Jayaram	1–6, 4–6
Runner-up	12.	9 May 2003	New Delhi, India	Clay	(India) Sheethal Goutham	(India) Ankita Bhambri (India) Sonal Phadke	6–7^{(3)}, 0–6
Winner	13.	15 May 2003	New Delhi, India	Carpet	(India) Sheethal Goutham	(India) Liza Pereira Viplav (India) Archana Venkataraman	2–6, 7–6^{(4)}, 6–0
Winner	14.	26 May 2003	New Delhi, India	Hard	(India) Sheethal Goutham	(India) Isha Lakhani (India) Liza Pereira Viplav	7–5, 6–2
Runner-up	15.	31 August 2003	New Delhi, India	Grass	(India) Sheethal Goutham	(Malaysia) Khoo Chin-bee (India) Meghha Vakaria	1–6, 2–6
Runner-up	16.	5 October 2003	Jakarta, Indonesia	Hard	(Thailand) Wilawan Choptang	(Indonesia) Septi Mende (Indonesia) Maya Rosa	6–7^{(6)}, 4–6
Winner	17.	6 December 2004	Kolkata, India	Hard	(Thailand) Wilawan Choptang	(India) Ankita Bhambri (India) Sanaa Bhambri	6–2, 7–5
Runner-up	18.	9 May 2005	Ahmedabad, India	Hard	(India) Sanaa Bhambri	(India) Ankita Bhambri (India) Sai Jayalakshmy Jayaram	2–6, 5–7
