= Lagos Open (2000–present) =

Tournament information
- Event name: Lagos
- Location: Lagos, Nigeria
- Venue: Lagos Lawn Tennis Club
- Category: ITF Women's Circuit; ITF Men's Circuit
- Surface: Hard
- Draw: 32S/32Q/16D
- Prize money: $25,000
- Website: official website

Lagos Open is an International Tennis Federation accredited tournament that takes place annually at Lagos Lawn Tennis Club. It is classified as a $25,000 tournament on the Women's and Men's Circuit, and has been held in Lagos, Nigeria. Due to the West African Ebola virus epidemic, the 14th edition was competed only by African players and was made a non-point winning tournament by ITF. By 2015, the move has reversed, and the competition regained its international status. In 2018, the competition was renamed from "Governor's Cup Lagos Tennis" to "Lagos Open", which was stated by the organizers as a procedure from ITF to increase the prestige of the competition from a Futures tournaments to a Challenger series. The total prize money for the 2017 edition was $100,000.

== Past finals ==
=== Women's singles ===
Year	Champion	Runner-up	Score
2019 (2)	(India) Riya Bhatia	(Slovenia) Nastja Kolar	7–5, 1–6, 6–3
2019 (1)	(Burundi) Sada Nahimana	(Brazil) Laura Pigossi	2–6, 6–4, 6–3
2018 (2)	(India) Pranjala Yadlapalli	(Switzerland) Conny Perrin	6–1, 7–6^{(7–2)}
2018 (1)	(India) Pranjala Yadlapalli	(Switzerland) Conny Perrin	2–6, 7–5, 6–0
2017 (2)	(Switzerland) Conny Perrin	(Israel) Deniz Khazaniuk	7–6^{(13–11)}, 6–3
2017 (1)	(Israel) Deniz Khazaniuk	(Switzerland) Conny Perrin	4–6, 6–1, 6–3
2016 (2)	(Switzerland) Conny Perrin	(Slovenia) Tadeja Majerič	6–3, 6–3
2016 (1)	(Slovenia) Tadeja Majerič	(Switzerland) Conny Perrin	3–6, 6–1, 6–1
2015 (2)	(Switzerland) Conny Perrin	(Slovenia) Tadeja Majerič	3–6, 6–4, 7–6^{(8–6)}
2015 (1)	(France) Tessah Andrianjafitrimo	(Slovenia) Tadeja Majerič	6–3, 5–7, 6–4
2014 *	(Madagascar) Zarah Razafimahatratra	(Nigeria) Sarah Adegoke	6–0, 6–1
2013 (2)	(Italy) Gioia Barbieri	(Russia) Nina Bratchikova	3–6, 6–3, 3–0 ret.
2013 (1)	(Slovenia) Tadeja Majerič	(Slovenia) Dalila Jakupović	7–5, 7–5
2012 (2)	(Romania) Cristina Dinu	(Switzerland) Conny Perrin	6–3, 6–3
2012 (1)	(Romania) Cristina Dinu	(South Africa) Chanel Simmonds	7–5, 4–6, 6–4
2011 (2)	(Belgium) Tamaryn Hendler	(Croatia) Donna Vekić	6–4, 7–5
2011 (1)	(Ukraine) Elina Svitolina	(Croatia) Donna Vekić	6–4, 6–3
2010 (2)	(Russia) Nina Bratchikova	(Slovakia) Zuzana Kučová	7–5, 6–1
2010 (1)	(Slovakia) Zuzana Kučová	(France) Natalie Piquion	6–2, 6–0
2009 (2)	(Slovakia) Zuzana Kučová	(Russia) Nina Bratchikova	6–0, 7–6^{(7–5)}
2009 (1)	(Slovakia) Zuzana Kučová	(Greece) Anna Gerasimou	6–3, 7–5
2008 (2)	(Slovakia) Zuzana Kučová	(Romania) Ágnes Szatmári	7–6^{(7–5)}, 4–6, 6–3
2008 (1)	(Belgium) Tamaryn Hendler	(India) Ankita Bhambri	6–3, 2–6, 6–3
2007 (2)	(South Africa) Chanelle Scheepers	(Slovakia) Zuzana Kučová	6–2, 6–0
2007 (1)	(Slovakia) Zuzana Kučová	(Germany) Syna Kayser	6–2, 6–2
2006 (2)	(Romania) Magda Mihalache	(Romania) Ágnes Szatmári	6–1, 3–6, 6–4
2006 (1)	(Poland) Magdalena Kiszczyńska	(Germany) Laura Siegemund	6–4, 6–2
2005 (2)	(United Kingdom) Anne Keothavong	(Slovenia) Maša Zec Peškirič	6–3, 7–6^{(9–7)}
2005 (1)	(Czech Republic) Petra Cetkovská	(United Kingdom) Anne Keothavong	3–6, 6–3, 6–2
2004 (2)	(India) Sania Mirza	(South Africa) Chanelle Scheepers	4–6, 7–6^{(7–3)}, 7–5
2004 (1)	(India) Sania Mirza	(United States) Tiffany Dabek	6–3, 5–7, 6–3
2003 (2)	(Germany) Franziska Etzel	(South Africa) Michelle Snyman	6–3, 7–6^{(8–6)}
2003 (1)	(Egypt) Heidi El Tabakh	(India) Sai Jayalakshmy Jayaram	6–4, 6–4
2002	not held		
2001	(Cameroon) Lillie Nzudie		
2000	(Nigeria) Osaro Amadin	(Nigeria) Aminat Balogun	

*Due to the West African Ebola virus epidemic, the 14th edition was competed only by African players and was made a non-point winning tournament by ITF

=== Women's doubles ===
Year	Champions	Runners-up	Score
2019 (2)	(India) Rutuja Bhosale (Brazil) Laura Pigossi	(Egypt) Sandra Samir (India) Prarthana Thombare	6–3, 6–7^{(3–7)}, [10–6]
2019 (1)	(India) Rutuja Bhosale (Brazil) Laura Pigossi	(Egypt) Sandra Samir (India) Prarthana Thombare	4–6, 6–4, [10–7]
2018 (2)	(Bulgaria) Julia Terziyska (Netherlands) Rosalie van der Hoek	(Netherlands) Merel Hoedt (Netherlands) Noa Liauw a Fong	6–4, 6–4
2018 (1)	(Slovakia) Tereza Mihalíková (Bulgaria) Julia Terziyska	(France) Estelle Cascino (Israel) Deniz Khazaniuk	6–7^{(4–7)}, 6–2, [10–7]
2017 (2)	(Switzerland) Conny Perrin (Ukraine) Valeriya Strakhova	(Slovenia) Tadeja Majerič (United Kingdom) Tiffany William	6–1, 6–2
2017 (1)	(Turkey) Ayla Aksu (Montenegro) Ana Veselinović	(Switzerland) Conny Perrin (Ukraine) Valeriya Strakhova	6–4, 6–2
2016 (2)	(Greece) Valentini Grammatikopoulou (India) Prarthana Thombare	(India) Kyra Shroff (India) Dhruthi Tatachar Venugopal	6–7^{(3–7)}, 6–3, [11–9]
2016 (1)	(Netherlands) Chayenne Ewijk (Netherlands) Rosalie van der Hoek	(Greece) Valentini Grammatikopoulou (India) Prarthana Thombare	7–5, 6–3
2015 (2)	(Bulgaria) Julia Terziyska (India) Prarthana Thombare	(Slovenia) Tadeja Majerič (Switzerland) Conny Perrin	4–6, 6–3, [10–8]
2015 (1)	(Russia) Margarita Lazareva (Ukraine) Valeriya Strakhova	(Zimbabwe) Valeria Bhunu (Israel) Ester Masuri	6–1, 6–2
2014	(Nigeria) Sarah Adegoke (Madagascar) Tessah Andrianjafitrimo		
2013 (2)	(Oman) Fatma Al-Nabhani (Italy) Gioia Barbieri	(Switzerland) Conny Perrin (South Africa) Chanel Simmonds	1–6, 6–4, [10–8]
2013 (1)	(United Kingdom) Naomi Broady (United Kingdom) Emily Webley-Smith	(Oman) Fatma Al-Nabhani (Romania) Cristina Dinu	3–6, 6–4, [10–7]
2012 (2)	(Switzerland) Conny Perrin (South Africa) Chanel Simmonds	(China) Lu Jiajing (China) Lu Jiaxiang	6–2, 3–6, [10–7]
2012 (1)	(Switzerland) Conny Perrin (South Africa) Chanel Simmonds	(Russia) Nina Bratchikova (Russia) Margarita Lazareva	6–1, 6–1
2011 (2)	(Austria) Melanie Klaffner (Romania) Ágnes Szatmári	(Montenegro) Danka Kovinić (Ukraine) Elina Svitolina	6–0, 6–7^{(1–7)}, [10–5]
2011 (1)	(Russia) Nina Bratchikova (Austria) Melanie Klaffner	(Slovenia) Tadeja Majerič (Bulgaria) Aleksandrina Naydenova	7–5, 5–7, [10–6]
2010 (2)	(Austria) Melanie Klaffner (Poland) Karolina Kosińska	(Russia) Nina Bratchikova (Romania) Ágnes Szatmári	3–6, 7–5, [10–7]
2010 (1)	(Russia) Nina Bratchikova (Romania) Ágnes Szatmári	(Sweden) Anna Brazhnikova (Russia) Anastasia Mukhametova	6–4, 6–3
2009 (2)	(Russia) Nina Bratchikova (Greece) Anna Gerasimou	(Israel) Chen Astrogo (Israel) Keren Shlomo	6–4, 7–5
2009 (1)	(Russia) Nina Bratchikova (Greece) Anna Gerasimou	(Sweden) Anna Brazhnikova (Russia) Anastasia Mukhametova	7–6^{(7–3)}, 7–6^{(7–1)}
2008 (2)	(Russia) Elena Chalova (Russia) Valeria Savinykh	(India) Rushmi Chakravarthi (India) Isha Lakhani	6–7^{(6–8)}, 6–3, [10–7]
2008 (1)	(South Africa) Surina De Beer (Romania) Ágnes Szatmári	(Belgium) Tamaryn Hendler (Italy) Lisa Sabino	7–6^{(9–7)}, 6–3
2007 (2)	(South Africa) Kelly Anderson (South Africa) Chanelle Scheepers	(Belarus) Iryna Kuryanovich (Romania) Ágnes Szatmári	1–6, 6–3, [10–6]
2007 (1)	(South Africa) Kelly Anderson (South Africa) Chanelle Scheepers	(Belarus) Iryna Kuryanovich (Romania) Ágnes Szatmári	0–6, 6–3, [10–8]
2006 (2)	(South Africa) Surina De Beer (Romania) Ágnes Szatmári	(India) Sanaa Bhambri (India) Rushmi Chakravarthi	6–3, 6–1
2006 (1)	(Romania) Magda Mihalache (Germany) Laura Siegemund	(Italy) Lisa Sabino (Thailand) Montinee Tangphong	6–3, 6–3
2005 (2)	(India) Ankita Bhambri (India) Sanaa Bhambri	(India) Rushmi Chakravarthi (India) Punam Reddy	walkover
2005 (1)	(South Africa) Surina De Beer (Spain) Gabriela Velasco Andreu	(Italy) Lisa Sabino (Slovenia) Maša Zec Peškirič	6–4, 6–2
2004 (2)	(South Africa) Surina De Beer (South Africa) Chanelle Scheepers	(India) Sania Mirza (New Zealand) Shelley Stephens	6–0, 6–0
2004 (1)	(India) Sania Mirza (New Zealand) Shelley Stephens	(South Africa) Surina De Beer (South Africa) Chanelle Scheepers	6–1, 6–4
2003 (2)	(Egypt) Heidi El Tabakh (Egypt) Yomna Farid	(South Africa) Lizaan du Plessis (Egypt) Noha Mohsen	6–1, 5–7, 6–1
2003 (1)	(United Kingdom) Rebecca Dandeniya (South Africa) Michelle Snyman	(Egypt) Heidi El Tabakh (Egypt) Yomna Farid	7–5, 6–3

=== Men's singles ===
Year	Champion	Runner-up	Score
2019 (2)	(France) Calvin Hemery	(Bosnia and Herzegovina) Aldin Šetkić	4–2 ret.
2019 (1)	(France) Calvin Hemery	(Bosnia and Herzegovina) Aldin Šetkić	6–1, 6–2
2018 (2)	(United Kingdom) Jack Draper	(France) Tom Jomby	1–6, 6–3, 6–4
2018 (1)	(France) Tom Jomby	(France) Arthur Rinderknech	6–3, 3–6, 6–3
2017 (2)	(Serbia) Peđa Krstin	(France) Johan Tatlot	6–2, 4–6, 6–3
2017 (1)	(Serbia) Peđa Krstin	(Netherlands) Stephan Fransen	6–2, 6–3
2016 (2)	(Spain) Enrique López Pérez	(France) Calvin Hemery	7–5, 7–5
2016 (1)	(Spain) Enrique López Pérez	(France) Gianni Mina	6–2, 6–7^{(7–9)}, 6–1
2015 (2)	(Netherlands) Antal van der Duim	(Zimbabwe) Takanyi Garanganga	6–3, 7–6^{(7–0)}
2015 (1)	(Bosnia and Herzegovina) Aldin Šetkić	(France) Sadio Doumbia	6–2, 6–0
2014	(Nigeria) Michael Moses	(Uganda) Duncan Mugabe	6–0, 6–1
2013 (2)	(Croatia) Ante Pavić	(India) Jeevan Nedunchezhiyan	6–4, 6–3
2013 (1)	(Croatia) Borna Ćorić	(Croatia) Ante Pavić	6–4, 6–3
2012 (2)	(Spain) Enrique López Pérez	(South Africa) Ruan Roelofse	6–0, 6–4
2012 (1)	(Spain) Enrique López Pérez	(Egypt) Sherif Sabry	7–5, 1–6, 6–4
2011 (2)	(Slovenia) Kamil Čapkovič	(India) Vijayant Malik	6–2, 7–5
2011 (1)	(India) Yuki Bhambri	(South Africa) Ruan Roelofse	7–5, 7–5
2010 (2)	(India) Karan Rastogi	(South Africa) Ruan Roelofse	6–2, 6–7^{(4–7)}, 7–5
2010 (1)	(Israel) Amir Weintraub	(India) Karan Rastogi	2–6, 6–4, 7–5
2009 (2)	(Morocco) Reda El Amrani	(Israel) Gilad Ben Zvi	6–3, 6–3
2009 (1)	(Morocco) Reda El Amrani	(Netherlands) Boy Westerhof	6–3, 6–3
2008 (2)	(Slovakia) Kamil Čapkovič	(Russia) Ilya Belyaev	6–3, 6–2
2008 (1)	(Slovakia) Kamil Čapkovič	(India) Divij Sharan	6–4, 4–6, 6–4
2007 (2)	(United Kingdom) Alexander Slabinsky	(Romania) Cătălin-Ionuț Gârd	6–4, 6–3
2007 (1)	(Netherlands) Boy Westerhof	(Morocco) Reda El Amrani	6–3, 6–4
2006 (2)	(Ukraine) Illya Marchenko	(Togo) Komlavi Loglo	7–5, 6–3
2006 (1)	(Bosnia and Herzegovina) Ivan Dodig	(Ukraine) Illya Marchenko	6–3, 6–4
2005 (2)	(Togo) Komlavi Loglo	(Qatar) Johar-Mubarak Segodo	6–4, 3–6, 6–3
2005 (1)	(Ghana) Henry Adjei-Darko	(Ivory Coast) Valentin Sanon	5–7, 6–4, 7–6^{(7–1)}
2004 (2)	(Germany) Sebastian Fitz	(South Africa) Roger Anderson	6–3, 6-7^{(9–11)}, 6–3
2004 (1)	(Pakistan) Aisam-ul-Haq Qureshi	(Germany) Sebastian Fitz	2–6, 7–6^{(9–7)}, 6–3
2003 (2)	(South Africa) Raven Klaasen	(Austria) Martin Slanar	3–6, 6–3, 6–4
2003 (1)	(South Africa) Wesley Whitehouse	(South Africa) Willem-Petrus Meyer	6–4, 6–2
2002	not held		
2001	(Nigeria) Sule Ladipo	(Mali) Mohamed-Sekou Drame	1–6, 6–4, 3–6, 6–4, 6–4
2000	(Ivory Coast) Claude N'Goran	(Benin) Christophe Pognon	6–2, 6–4, 6–3

=== Men's doubles ===
Year	Champions	Runners-up	Score
2019 (2)	(Zimbabwe) Benjamin Lock (Zimbabwe) Courtney John Lock	(United States) William Bushamuka (India) Aryan Goveas	6–2, 6–4
2019 (1)	(Tunisia) Aziz Dougaz (Tunisia) Skander Mansouri	(Zimbabwe) Benjamin Lock (Zimbabwe) Courtney John Lock	7–6^{(7–4)}, 6–3
2018 (2)	(Zimbabwe) Benjamin Lock (Zimbabwe) Courtney John Lock	(France) Tom Jomby (Benin) Alexis Klégou	3–6, 6–4, [10–7]
2018 (1)	(Ukraine) Danylo Kalenichenko (Brazil) Diego Matos	(United States) William Bushamuka (France) Arthur Rinderknech	6–2, 5–7, [10–7]
2017 (2)	(Croatia) Ivan Sabanov (Croatia) Matej Sabanov	(India) Chandril Sood (India) Lakshit Sood	6–3, 6–4
2017 (1)	(Croatia) Ivan Sabanov (Croatia) Matej Sabanov	(France) Tom Jomby (France) Johan Tatlot	4–6, 7–5, [10–5]
2016 (2)	(Spain) Alejandro Davidovich Fokina (Benin) Alexis Klégou	(Poland) Karol Drzewiecki (Poland) Maciej Smola	6–4, 6–1
2016 (1)	(Spain) Enrique López Pérez (Netherlands) Boy Westerhof	(France) Calvin Hemery (France) Gianni Mina	6–2, 6–3
2015 (2)	(South Africa) Lloyd Harris (Egypt) Karim-Mohamed Maamoun	(Netherlands) David Pel (Netherlands) Antal van der Duim	7–5, 7–6^{(8–6)}
2015 (1)	(Netherlands) David Pel (Netherlands) Antal van der Duim	(South Africa) Lloyd Harris (Egypt) Karim-Mohamed Maamoun	6–3, 6–2
2014			
2013 (2)	(Croatia) Ante Pavić (South Africa) Ruan Roelofse	(Croatia) Borna Ćorić (Croatia) Dino Marcan	7–5, 6–3
2013 (1)	(Croatia) Ante Pavić (South Africa) Ruan Roelofse	(Croatia) Borna Ćorić (Croatia) Dino Marcan	7–6^{(7–3)}, 6–2
2012 (2)	(Slovakia) Kamil Čapkovič (South Africa) Ruan Roelofse	(Italy) Alessandro Bega (Spain) Enrique López Pérez	6–1, 6–2
2012 (1)	(Slovakia) Kamil Čapkovič (South Africa) Ruan Roelofse	(Italy) Alessandro Bega (Spain) Enrique López Pérez	6–4, 6–2
2011 (2)	(France) Paterne Mamata (Uzbekistan) Vaja Uzakov	(Nigeria) Abdulmumin Babalola (Senegal) Daouda Ndiaye	7–5, 3–6, [10–6]
2011 (1)	(India) Yuki Bhambri (India) Ranjeet Virali-Murugesan	(India) Karan Rastogi (India) Vishnu Vardhan	6–2, 7–5
2010 (2)	(Israel) Amir Weintraub (Netherlands) Boy Westerhof	(South Africa) Raven Klaasen (South Africa) Ruan Roelofse	5–7, 6–4, [10–6]
2010 (1)	(Israel) Amir Weintraub (Netherlands) Boy Westerhof	(Belgium) Niels Desein (France) Laurent Rochette	walkover
2009 (2)	(United States) John Paul Fruttero (Romania) Cătălin-Ionuț Gârd	(Togo) Komlavi Loglo (Ivory Coast) Valentin Sanon	6–1, 7–6^{(7–3)}
2009 (1)	(Morocco) Reda El Amrani (Morocco) Anas Fattar	(Togo) Komlavi Loglo (Ivory Coast) Valentin Sanon	6–4, 3–6, [10–3]
2008 (2)	(Slovakia) Kamil Čapkovič (Netherlands) Boy Westerhof	(Russia) Ilya Belyaev (Russia) Sergei Krotiouk	6–3, 7–6^{(7–2)}
2008 (1)	(India) Rohan Gajjar (India) Divij Sharan	(Russia) Pavel Chekhov (Belarus) Pavel Katliarov	7–6^{(8–6)}, 6–7^{(2–7)}, [10–7]
2007 (2)	(Nigeria) Abdulmumin Babalola (Nigeria) Jonathan Igbinovia	(Nigeria) Candy Idoko (Nigeria) Lawal Shehu	6–3, 6–4
2007 (1)	(India) Navdeep Singh (United Kingdom) Alexander Slabinsky	(Israel) Idan Mark (Israel) Amir Weintraub	7–6^{(7–2)}, 3–6, [10–7]
2006 (2)	(Nigeria) Abdulmumin Babalola (Togo) Komlavi Loglo	(Bosnia and Herzegovina) Ivan Dodig (Bosnia and Herzegovina) Zlatan Kadric	7–5, 7–5
2006 (1)	(Bosnia and Herzegovina) Ivan Dodig (Bosnia and Herzegovina) Zlatan Kadric	(Netherlands) Floris Kilian (Netherlands) Boy Westerhof	6–3, 7–6^{(7–2)}
2005 (2)	(Togo) Komlavi Loglo (Ivory Coast) Valentin Sanon	(El Salvador) Rafael Arévalo (Germany) Alexander Satschko	3–6, 6–4, 6–1
2005 (1)	(El Salvador) Rafael Arévalo (Germany) Alexander Satschko	(United Kingdom) Colin Beecher (United Kingdom) Ross Hutchins	6–7^{(3–7)}, 6–4, 6–4
2004 (2)	(South Africa) Roger Anderson (Slovenia) Luka Gregorc	(Chile) Juan Ignacio Cerda (Netherlands) Jasper Smit	6–3, 6–2
2004 (1)	(Togo) Komlavi Loglo (Ivory Coast) Valentin Sanon	(Switzerland) Fabian Roetschi (Switzerland) Benjamin-David Rufer	7–5, 6–1
2003 (2)	(Zimbabwe) Genius Chidzikwe (South Africa) Raven Klaasen	(Israel) Eliran Dooyev (Israel) Maor Zirkin	walkover
2003 (1)	(South Africa) Wesley Whitehouse (South Africa) Willem-Petrus Meyer	(Austria) Martin Slanar (Israel) Tomer Suissa	7–6^{(7–3)}, 6–3
