= Septi Mende =

Indonesian tennis player

- Country (sports): Indonesia
- Residence: Jakarta, Indonesia
- Born: 21 September 1987 (age 38) Jakarta
- Height: 1.65 m (5 ft 5 in)
- Turned pro: 2000
- Plays: Right-handed
- Prize money: $15,278

Singles
- Career record: 42–38
- Career titles: 1 ITF
- Highest ranking: No. 580 (2 August 2004)

Doubles
- Career record: 74–28
- Career titles: 9 ITF
- Highest ranking: No. 391 (27 June 2005)
Medal record
Southeast Asian Games
Silver medal – second place	2005 Manila	Women's doubles

Septi Mende (born 21 September 1987) is an Indonesian former tennis player. She made her debut as a professional in October 2000, aged 14, at an ITF tournament in Jakarta.

In 2002 and 2003, she played in the Australian Open Junior Championships. In 2003, she and her partner Sandy Gumulya reached the quarterfinals of the Australian Open Junior Championships doubles competition.

She was part of Indonesia's Fed Cup team in 2006, but her only scheduled match was not played.

At the 2005 Southeast Asian Games, Mende won a silver medal in the women's doubles competitions, partnering with Ayu-Fani Damayanti.

In 2008, she reached the final of the inaugural Garuda Indonesia Tennis Masters in women's doubles, partnering Grace Sari Ysidora. They were defeated by Ayu-Fani Damayanti and Liza Andriyani.

At the 2011 Southeast Asian Games, Mende represented Indonesia in Soft tennis. She won two gold medals, in mixed doubles and women's team.

== ITF Circuit finals ==
Legend
$25,000 tournaments
$10,000 tournaments

=== Singles (1–0) ===
Result	Date	Tournament	Surface	Opponent	Score
Win	16 November 2003	Manila, Philippines	Clay	(South Korea) Yoo Mi	6–4, 6–0

=== Doubles: 15 (9–6) ===
Result	No.	Date	Tournament	Surface	Partner	Opponents	Score
Loss	1.	4 May 2003	Jakarta, Indonesia	Clay	(Indonesia) Sandy Gumulya	(Chinese Taipei) Chuang Chia-jung (Chinese Taipei) Hwang I-hsuan	4–6, 3–6
Win	1.	5 October 2003	Jakarta, Indonesia	Hard	(Indonesia) Maya Rosa	(Thailand) Wilawan Choptang (India) Shruti Dhawan	7–6^{(6)}, 6–4
Win	2.	2 May 2004	Jakarta, Indonesia	Hard	(Indonesia) Wukirasih Sawondari	(Japan) Kumiko Iijima (Japan) Mari Inoue	6–2, 6–3
Win	3.	9 May 2004	Jakarta, Indonesia	Hard	(Indonesia) Wukirasih Sawondari	(Indonesia) Liza Andriyani (Thailand) Thassha Vitayaviroj	6–4, 6–3
Win	4.	27 September 2004	Balikpapan, Indonesia	Hard	(Indonesia) Ayu Fani Damayanti	(Indonesia) Sandy Gumulya (Thailand) Pichittra Thongdach	6–2, 6–2
Win	5.	1 November 2004	Manila, Philippines	Hard	(Indonesia) Ayu Fani Damayanti	(South Korea) Kim Hae-sung (South Korea) Lee Ye-ra	7–6^{(2)}, 1–6, 6–0
Loss	2.	8 November 2004	Manila, Philippines	Hard	(Indonesia) Ayu Fani Damayanti	(Thailand) Prim Buaklee (Thailand) Nudnida Luangnam	w/o
Win	6.	13 December 2004	Jakarta, Indonesia	Hard	(Indonesia) Ayu Fani Damayanti	(South Korea) Yoo Mi (Russia) Julia Efremova	4–6, 6–0, 7–5
Loss	3.	4 April 2005	Wuhan, China	Hard	(Indonesia) Ayu Fani Damayanti	(China) Ji Chunmei (China) Yu Dan	2–6, 4–6
Loss	4.	12 April 2005	Changsha, China	Hard	(Indonesia) Ayu Fani Damayanti	(China) Yang Shujing (China) Yu Ying	1–6, 7–6^{(5)}, 2–6
Win	7.	25 April 2005	Jakarta, Indonesia	Hard	(Indonesia) Ayu Fani Damayanti	(Thailand) Orawan Lamangthong (Indonesia) Wukirasih Sawondari	6–1, 6–3
Win	8.	2 May 2006	Jakarta, Indonesia	Hard	(Indonesia) Ayu Fani Damayanti	(China) Huang Lei (China) Xie Yanze	6–4, 6–4
Loss	5.	13 May 2006	Tarakan, Indonesia	Hard	(Indonesia) Sandy Gumulya	(China) Xia Huan (China) Xu Yifan	2–6, 7–6^{(3)}, 6–7^{(5)}
Win	9.	16 May 2007	Balikpapan, Indonesia	Hard	(Indonesia) Wukirasih Sawondari	(Indonesia) Lavinia Tananta (Indonesia) Vivien Silfany-Tony	3–6, 6–3, 6–4
Loss	6.	12 November 2007	Manila, Philippines	Hard	(Indonesia) Ayu Fani Damayanti	(Chinese Taipei) Chen Yi (Chinese Taipei) Kao Shao-yuan	3–6, 5–7
