= Sheethal Goutham =

Indian tennis player

Shee Goutham
- Country (sports): India
- Born: 6 June 1981 (age 44); Bangalore, India
- Retired: 2011
- Plays: Right-handed (two-handed backhand)
- Prize money: $20,560

Singles
- Career record: 59–80
- Career titles: 5 ITF
- Highest ranking: No. 591 (24 September 2001)

Doubles
- Career record: 61–68
- Career titles: 13 ITF
- Highest ranking: No. 477 (27 August 2001)

Team competitions
- Fed Cup: 1–1

Sheethal Goutham (born 6 June 1981) is an Indian former professional tennis player.

Goutham has a career-high singles ranking of 591 by the WTA, achieved on 24 September 2001. She also has a career-high WTA doubles ranking of 477, reached on 27 August 2001. Goutham won five singles and 13 doubles titles on the ITF Women's Circuit.

Playing for India Fed Cup team, Goutham has a win–loss record of 1–1.

She started playing tennis at the age of 9. Her brother Arjun Goutham also plays tennis and has helped her in her training. Sheethal Goutham married her fiancé, cricketer Robin Uthappa, in March 2016.

== ITF finals ==
=== Singles: 8 (5–3) ===
Outcome	No.	Date	Location	Surface	Opponent	Score
Winner	1.	15 March 2001	New Delhi, India	Hard	(Sweden) Nina Wennerström	6–1, 6–2
Runner-up	2.	16 June 2001	New Delhi, India	Clay	(India) Archana Venkataraman	4–6, 1–6
Winner	3.	2 July 2001	New Delhi, India	Clay	(India) Meghha Vakaria	6–7^{(2)}, 7–5, 7–6^{(1)}
Runner-up	4.	22 April 2002	Pune, India	Clay	(India) Ankita Bhambri	3–6, 2–6
Winner	5.	27 May 2002	Mumbai, India	Carpet	(India) Ankita Bhambri	6–4, 2–6, 6–4
Winner	6.	3 June 2002	Mumbai, India	Carpet	(India) Shruti Dhawan	6–2, 6–4
Winner	7.	8 June 2002	Mumbai, India	Carpet	(India) Shruti Dhawan	6–4, 6–0
Runner-up	8.	23 June 2002	New Delhi, India	Carpet	(India) Radhika Tulpule	2–6, 4–6

=== Doubles: 22 (13–9) ===
Outcome	No.	Date	Location	Surface	Partner	Opponents	Score
Winner	1.	26 October 1998	Ahmedabad, India	Hard	(India) Shruti Dhawan	(India) Rushmi Chakravarthi (India) Sai Jayalakshmy Jayaram	6–4, 6–4
Runner-up	2.	17 April 1999	Mumbai, India	Hard	(India) Shruti Dhawan	(India) Rushmi Chakravarthi (India) Sai Jayalakshmy Jayaram	7–5, 0–6, 3–6
Runner-up	3.	30 April 1999	Mumbai, India	Hard	(India) Shruti Dhawan	(India) Rushmi Chakravarthi (India) Sai Jayalakshmy Jayaram	5–7, 2–6
Winner	4.	10 May 1999	Mumbai, India	Hard	(India) Shruti Dhawan	(India) Rushmi Chakravarthi (India) Sai Jayalakshmy Jayaram	1–0 ret.
Runner-up	5.	8 May 2000	Indore, India	Hard	(India) Liza Pereira Viplav	(India) Archana Venkataraman (India) Arthi Venkataraman	4–6, 4–6
Runner-up	6.	21 May 2000	New Delhi, India	Hard	(India) Liza Pereira Viplav	(India) Isha Lakhani (India) Meghha Vakaria	5–7, 2–6
Winner	7.	18 March 2001	New Delhi, India	Hard	(India) Liza Pereira Viplav	(India) Archana Venkataraman (India) Arthi Venkataraman	7–6^{(3)}, 6–2
Winner	8.	24 March 2001	New Delhi, India	Hard	(India) Liza Pereira Viplav	(India) Radhika Mandke (India) Sonal Phadke	6–3, 7–5
Runner-up	9.	29 May 2001	New Delhi, India	Hard	(India) Liza Pereira Viplav	(India) Yamini Thukkaiandi (India) Arthi Venkataraman	2–6, 4–6
Winner	10.	2 June 2001	Mumbai, India	Clay	(India) Liza Pereira Viplav	(India) Karishma Patel (India) Sonal Phadke	6–4, 6–3
Winner	11.	9 June 2001	Mumbai, India	Clay	(India) Liza Pereira Viplav	(India) Karishma Patel (India) Sonal Phadke	6–3, 7–5
Winner	12.	16 June 2001	Mumbai, India	Clay	(India) Liza Pereira Viplav	(India) Karishma Patel (India) Sonal Phadke	6–4, 6–1
Winner	13.	23 June 2001	Mumbai, India	Clay	(India) Liza Pereira Viplav	(India) Preeti Rao (India) Samrita Sekar	7–6^{(7)}, 6–0
Runner-up	14.	27 May 2002	Mumbai, India	Carpet	(India) Shruti Dhawan	(India) Liza Pereira Viplav (India) Radhika Tulpule	6–7^{(6)}, 4–6
Winner	15.	21 June 2002	Mumbai, India	Carpet	(India) Shruti Dhawan	(India) Archana Venkataraman (India) Arthi Venkataraman	7–5, 6–0
Winner	16.	26 June 2002	Mumbai, India	Clay	(India) Shruti Dhawan	(India) Ankita Bhambri (India) Sonal Phadke	6–3, 2–6, 6–3
Winner	17.	1 July 2002	Mumbai, India	Carpet	(India) Shruti Dhawan	(India) Liza Pereira Viplav (India) Radhika Tulpule	6–1, 6–2
Runner-up	18.	16 September 2002	Hyderabad, India	Hard	(India) Shruti Dhawan	(Thailand) Wilawan Choptang (Malaysia) Khoo Chin-bee	2–6, 2–6
Runner-up	19.	9 May 2003	New Delhi, India	Clay	(India) Shruti Dhawan	(India) Ankita Bhambri (India) Sonal Phadke	6–7^{(3)}, 0–6
Winner	20.	15 May 2003	New Delhi, India	Carpet	(India) Shruti Dhawan	(India) Liza Pereira Viplav (India) Archana Venkataraman	2–6, 7–6^{(4)}, 6–0
Winner	21.	26 May 2003	New Delhi, India	Hard	(India) Shruti Dhawan	(India) Isha Lakhani (India) Liza Pereira Viplav	7–5, 6–2
Runner-up	22.	31 August 2003	New Delhi, India	Grass	(India) Shruti Dhawan	(Malaysia) Khoo Chin-bee (India) Meghha Vakaria	1–6, 2–6
