= Khoo Chin-bee =

Malaysian tennis player

Khoo Chin-bee (邱振美)
- Country (sports): Malaysia
- Born: 4 May 1977 (age 48) Perak, Malaysia
- Turned pro: 1992
- Retired: 2009
- Plays: Right (two-handed backhand)
- Prize money: $47,640

Singles
- Career record: 133–123
- Career titles: 1 ITF
- Highest ranking: No. 329 (15 September 2003)

Doubles
- Career record: 121–92
- Career titles: 9 ITF
- Highest ranking: No. 209 (17 August 1998)

Team competitions
- Fed Cup: 25–17
Medal record
Women's Tennis
Representing Malaysia
Southeast Asian Games
Bronze medal – third place	1999 Bandar Seri Begawan	Singles
Bronze medal – third place	1999 Bandar Seri Begawan	Team
Bronze medal – third place	2001 Kuala Lumpur	Singles
Silver medal – second place	2001 Kuala Lumpur	Team
Bronze medal – third place	2001 Kuala Lumpur	Mixed
Bronze medal – third place	2003 Ho Chi Minh City	Mixed

Khoo Chin-bee

Chinese name
- Traditional Chinese: 邱振美
- Simplified Chinese: 邱振美
Transcriptions
Standard Mandarin
- Hanyu Pinyin: Qiū Zhènměi
Yue: Cantonese
- Jyutping: Jau1 Zan3 Mei5
Southern Min
- Hokkien POJ: Khu Chín-bí
- Tâi-lô: Khu Tsín-bí

Khoo Chin-bee (born 4 May 1977) is a Malaysian former tennis player.

She won one singles title and nine doubles titles on the ITF Women's Circuit in her career. On 15 September 2003, she reached her best singles ranking of world No. 329. On 17 August 1998, she peaked at No. 209 in the doubles rankings.

Playing for Malaysia in the Fed Cup, Khoo has a win–loss record of 25–17. She retired from the pro circuit in 2009.

== ITF Circuit finals ==
$25,000 tournaments
$10,000 tournaments

=== Singles: 6 (1 title, 5 runner-ups) ===
Result	No.	Date	Tournament	Surface	Opponent	Score
Loss	1.	11 November 1996	ITF Manila, Philippines	Hard	(Philippines) Maricris Gentz	0–6, 1–6
Loss	2.	17 November 1997	ITF Manila, Philippines	Hard	(China) Chen Jingjing	1–6, 6–7^{(2–7)}
Loss	3.	28 April 2003	ITF Jakarta, Indonesia	Clay	(Chinese Taipei) Chuang Chia-jung	5–7, 4–6
Loss	4.	21 June 2003	ITF Inchon, South Korea	Hard	(Uzbekistan) Akgul Amanmuradova	5–7, 1–6
Win	5.	17 August 2003	ITF Lagos, Nigeria	Hard	(India) Meghha Vakaria	6–1, 6–2
Loss	6.	31 August 2003	ITF New Delhi, India	Hard	(Thailand) Suchanun Viratprasert	2–6, 4–6

=== Doubles: 22 (9 titles, 13 runner-ups) ===
Result	No.	Date	Tournament	Surface	Partner	Opponents	Score
Loss	1.	26 February 1996	ITF Pretoria, South Africa	Hard	(South Africa) Surina De Beer	(United Kingdom) Heather Matthews (United Kingdom) Sara Tse	6–2, 6–7^{(4–7)}, 3–6
Loss	2.	4 March 1996	ITF Gaborone, Botswana	Hard	(South Africa) Surina De Beer	(United States) Audra Brannon (United States) Dana Evans	4–6, 5–7
Loss	3.	18 August 1996	ITF İstanbul, Turkey	Hard	(Romania) Alice Pirsu	(Turkey) İpek Şenoğlu (Bulgaria) Desislava Topalova	1–6, 4–6
Win	4.	9 September 1996	ITF Bangkok, Thailand	Hard	(Finland) Linda Jansson	(South Korea) Kim Hye-jeong (Thailand) Chotika Wannachinda	6–2, 4–6, 6–3
Loss	5.	4 November 1996	ITF Manila, Philippines	Hard	(South Korea) Won Kyung-joo	(Japan) Ayami Takase (Japan) Yoriko Yamagishi	3–6, 4–6
Win	6.	11 November 1996	ITF Manila, Philippines	Hard	(South Korea) Won Kyung-joo	(Indonesia) Marieke Gunawan (Indonesia) Suzanna Wibowo	6–1, 6–3
Loss	7.	10 November 1997	ITF Manila, Philippines	Hard	(Chinese Taipei) Weng Tzu-ting	(China) Ding Ding (China) Li Ting	5–7, 3–6
Loss	8.	10 November 1998	ITF Qingdao, China	Hard	(Japan) Satoko Kurioka	(China) Li Li (China) Yi Jing-Qian	4–6, 2–6
Win	9.	3 July 2000	ITF Edmond, United States	Hard	(South Korea) Chang Kyung-mi	(United States) Jacqueline Trail (Australia) Cindy Watson	6–4, 6–4
Loss	10.	8 July 2001	ITF Kaohsiung, Taiwan	Hard	(Chinese Taipei) Weng Tzu-ting	(Japan) Maki Arai (Japan) Kumiko Iijima	w/o
Loss	11.	28 October 2001	ITF Manila, Philippines	Hard	(Chinese Taipei) Chao Hsiao-han	(Chinese Taipei) Chuang Chia-jung (Chinese Taipei) Weng Tzu-ting	4–6, 4–6
Loss	12.	12 August 2002	ITF Nakhon Ratchasima, Thailand	Hard	(Thailand) Wilawan Choptang	(Indonesia) Liza Andriyani (Indonesia) Wukirasih Sawondari	2–6, 1–6
Win	13.	16 September 2002	ITF Hyderabad, India	Hard	(Thailand) Wilawan Choptang	(India) Shruti Dhawan (India) Sheethal Goutham	6–2, 6–2
Win	14.	31 March 2003	ITF Mumbai, India	Hard	(Uzbekistan) Akgul Amanmuradova	(India) Rushmi Chakravarthi (India) Sai Jayalakshmy Jayaram	6–2, 6–2
Loss	15.	13 April 2003	ITF Mumbai, India	Hard	(Uzbekistan) Akgul Amanmuradova	(Czech Republic) Ludmila Richterová (Russia) Julia Efremova	5–7, 5–7
Win	16.	11 May 2003	ITF Surabaya, Indonesia	Clay	(Chinese Taipei) Chuang Chia-jung	(Indonesia) Liza Andriyani (Indonesia) Wukirasih Sawondari	6–1, 6–0
Loss	17.	8 June 2003	ITF Seoul, South Korea	Hard	(Japan) Tomoko Yonemura	(Japan) Shiho Hisamatsu (South Korea) Jeon Mi-ra	3–6, 1–6
Win	18.	10 August 2003	Lagos Open, Nigeria	Hard	(India) Meghha Vakaria	(South Africa) Anca Anastasiu (Belgium) Jennifer Debodt	6–1, 6–2
Win	19.	17 August 2003	Lagos Open, Nigeria	Hard	(India) Meghha Vakaria	(India) Liza Pereira Viplav (India) Sonal Phadke	6–4, 6–4
Win	20.	31 August 2003	ITF New Delhi, India	Grass	(India) Meghha Vakaria	(India) Shruti Dhawan (India) Sheethal Goutham	6–1, 6–2
Loss	21.	8 September 2003	ITF Bangalore, India	Grass	(India) Meghha Vakaria	(India) Rushmi Chakravarthi (India) Sai Jayalakshmy Jayaram	2–6, 4–6
Loss	22.	5 April 2004	ITF New Delhi, India	Hard	(Chinese Taipei) Chuang Chia-jung	(China) Yang Shujing (China) Yu Ying	6–7^{(8–10)}, 1–2 ret.
