= Punam Reddy =

Indian tennis player

- Country (sports): India
- Born: 25 June 1987 (age 38)
- Retired: 2007
- Plays: Left-handed (two-handed backhand)
- Prize money: $11,241

Singles
- Career record: 33–41
- Career titles: 0
- Highest ranking: No. 475 (7 November 2005)

Doubles
- Career record: 13–31
- Career titles: 0
- Highest ranking: No. 546 (8 May 2006)

Punam Reddy (born 25 June 1987) is an American former professional tennis player.

In 2005, her only WTA Tour main-draw appearance came at the Kolkata Open when she partnered with countrywoman Ragini Vimal in the doubles event. They lost in the first round to Sania Mirza and Virginia Ruano Pascual.

== ITF Circuit finals ==
Legend
$25,000 tournaments
$10,000 tournaments

=== Singles: 1 (runner-up) ===
Result	Date	Location	Surface	Opponent	Score
Loss	29 October 2005	ITF Mumbai, India	Hard	(India) Isha Lakhani	4–6, 6–4, 2–6

=== Doubles: 1 (runner-up) ===
Result	Date	Tournament	Surface	Partner	Opponents	Score
Loss	17 October 2005	Lagos Open, Nigeria	Hard	(India) Rushmi Chakravarthi	(India) Ankita Bhambri (India) Sanaa Bhambri	w/o
