= Pichittra Thongdach =

Thai tennis player

- Country (sports): Thailand
- Born: 14 April 1987 (age 38)
- Plays: Right-handed
- Prize money: $10,817

Singles
- Career record: 38–42
- Career titles: 0
- Highest ranking: No. 651 (25 Sep 2006)

Doubles
- Career record: 29–27
- Career titles: 2 ITF
- Highest ranking: No. 525 (6 Nov 2006)

Pichittra Thongdach (born 14 April 1987) is a Thai former professional tennis player.

Thongdach made the main draw of the 2003 Pattaya Women's Open as a lucky loser and was beaten in the first round by Anastasia Rodionova, in three sets. A winner of two ITF doubles titles, Thongdach played varsity tennis in the United States for Boise State University from 2007 to 2010.

== ITF finals ==
=== Doubles (2–3) ===
Outcome	No.	Date	Tournament	Surface	Partner	Opponents	Score
Winner	1.	26 September 2004	Jakarta 3, Indonesia	Hard	(Chinese Taipei) Latisha Chan	(Indonesia) Liza Andriyani (Thailand) Thassha Vitayaviroj	6–3, 6–4
Runner-up	1.	3 October 2004	Balikpapan, Indonesia	Hard	(Indonesia) Sandy Gumulya	(Indonesia) Ayu Fani Damayanti (Indonesia) Septi Mende	2–6, 2–6
Runner-up	2.	25 March 2006	New Delhi 2, India	Hard	(Indonesia) Sandy Gumulya	(South Korea) Cho Jeong-a (South Korea) Kim Ji-young	6–2, 3–6, 3–6
Runner-up	3.	18 June 2006	New Delhi 5, India	Hard	(India) Isha Lakhani	(India) Rushmi Chakravarthi (India) Meghha Vakaria	3–6, 4–6
Winner	2.	6 August 2006	Bangkok 3, Thailand	Hard	(South Korea) Lee Jin-a	(Thailand) Uthumporn Pudtra (Hong Kong) Yang Zi-Jun	6–2, 6–1
