= Archana Venkataraman =

Indian tennis player

- Country (sports): India
- Born: 30 August 1988 (age 36)
- Retired: 2012
- Plays: Right-handed (two-handed backhand)
- Prize money: $28,113

Singles
- Career record: 90–102
- Career titles: 3 ITF
- Highest ranking: No. 549 (18 December 2000)

Doubles
- Career record: 63–90
- Career titles: 6 ITF
- Highest ranking: No. 510 (13 November 2006)

Archana Venkataraman (born 30 August 1988) is an Indian former professional tennis player.

Venkataraman has career-high WTA rankings of 549 in singles, achieved on 18 December 2000, and 510 in doubles, set on 13 November 2006. In her career, she won three singles and six doubles titles on the ITF Women's Circuit.

In 2006, her only WTA Tour main-draw appearance came at the Kolkata where she partnered with fellow Indian Ragini Vimal in the doubles event. But they lost in the first round to South African Liezel Huber and İndian Sania Mirza.

== ITF Circuit finals ==
$100,000 tournaments
$75,000 tournaments
$50,000 tournaments
$25,000 tournaments
$10,000 tournaments

=== Singles: 7 (3–4) ===
Result	No.	Date	Location	Surface	Opponent	Score
Loss	1.	10 May 1999	Mumbai, India	Hard	(India) Sai Jayalakshmy Jayaram	1–6, 5–7
Runner-up	2.	8 May 2000	Indore, India	Hard	(India) Sonal Phadke	7–5, 4–6, 6–7^{(5)}
Win	3.	15 May 2000	Indore, India	Hard	(India) Sonal Phadke	6–4, 6–4
Runner-up	4.	22 May 2000	Indore, India	Hard	(India) Meghha Vakaria	4–6, 5–7
Win	5.	12 February 2001	New Delhi, India	Hard	(India) Sonal Phadke	4–6, 6–2, 7–5
Runner-up	6.	29 April 2001	Pune, India	Hard	(India) Radhika Tulpule	6–4, 3–6, 6–7^{(7)}
Winner	7.	16 June 2001	New Delhi, India	Clay	(India) Sheethal Goutham	6–4, 6–1

=== Doubles: 20 (6–14) ===
Outcome	No.	Date	Tournament	Surface	Partner	Opponents	Score
Runner-up	1.	19 October 1998	Ahmedabad, India	Hard	(India) Arthi Venkataraman	(India) Rushmi Chakravarthi (India) Sai Jayalakshmy Jayaram	2–6, 4–6
Runner-up	2.	24 April 1999	Mumbai, India	Hard	(India) Arthi Venkataraman	(India) Rushmi Chakravarthi (India) Sai Jayalakshmy Jayaram	5–7, 6–3, 6–7
Winner	3.	8 May 2000	Indore, India	Hard	(India) Arthi Venkataraman	(India) Sheethal Goutham (India) Liza Pereira Viplav	6–4, 6–4
Winner	4.	15 May 2000	Indore, India	Hard	(India) Arthi Venkataraman	(India) Karishma Patel (India) Shalini Thakar	1–6, 6–3, 6–0
Winner	5.	22 May 2000	Indore, India	Hard	(India) Arthi Venkataraman	(India) Isha Lakhani (India) Meghha Vakaria	6–3, 1–6, 6–2
Runner-up	6.	11 March 2001	New Delhi, India	Hard	(India) Arthi Venkataraman	(India) Rushmi Chakravarthi (India) Sai Jayalakshmy Jayaram	1–6, 2–6
Runner-up	7.	18 March 2001	New Delhi, India	Hard	(India) Arthi Venkataraman	(India) Sheethal Goutham (India) Liza Pereira Viplav	6–7^{(3)}, 2–6
Runner-up	8.	1 April 2002	New Delhi, India	Hard	(India) Samrita Sekar	(India) Sai Jayalakshmy Jayaram (India) Radhika Tulpule	7–6^{(8)}, 4–6, 1–6
Runner-up	9.	8 April 2002	New Delhi, India	Hard	(India) Samrita Sekar	(India) Sai Jayalakshmy Jayaram (India) Radhika Tulpule	5–7, 0–6
Runner-up	10.	15 April 2002	New Delhi, India	Hard	(India) Samrita Sekar	(India) Sai Jayalakshmy Jayaram (India) Radhika Tulpule	2–6, 2–6
Runner-up	11.	22 April 2002	New Delhi, India	Clay	(India) Samrita Sekar	(India) Sai Jayalakshmy Jayaram (India) Radhika Tulpule	7–5, 1–6, 4–6
Runner-up	12.	21 June 2002	Mumbai, India	Carpet	(India) Arthi Venkataraman	(India) Sheethal Goutham (India) Shruti Dhawan	5–7, 0–6
Runner-up	13.	11 May 2003	New Delhi, India	Carpet	(India) Liza Pereira Viplav	(India) Sheethal Goutham (India) Shruti Dhawan	6–2, 6–7^{(4)}, 0–6
Runner-up	14.	9 November 2003	Pune, India	Hard	(India) Geeta Manohar	(Thailand) Montinee Tangphong (Thailand) Thassha Vitayaviroj	6–4, 5–7, 4–6
Runner-up	15.	23 May 2004	Lucknow, India	Grass	(India) Sai Jayalakshmy Jayaram	(India) Ankita Bhambri (India) Rushmi Chakravarthi	4–6, 1–6
Winner	16.	7 November 2005	Pune, India	Clay	(India) Geeta Manohar	(India) Parul Goswami (India) Sandhya Nagaraj	6–2, 7–6^{(5)}
Runner-up	17.	8 May 2006	New Delhi, India	Hard	(India) Rushmi Chakravarthi	(China) Zhao Yijing (China) Song Shanshan	3–6, 4–6
Winner	18.	15 May 2006	New Delhi, India	Hard	(India) Rushmi Chakravarthi	(China) Zhao Yijing (China) Song Shanshan	6–7^{(5)}, 6–2, 6–4
Winner	19.	16 June 2006	New Delhi, India	Hard	(India) Sanaa Bhambri	(China) Lu Jingjing (Singapore) Lee Wei-ping	6–3, 7–6^{(4)}
Runner-up	20.	28 April 2008	Cochin, India	Clay	(India) Geeta Manohar	(India) Rushmi Chakravarthi (India) Poojashree Venkatesha	1–6, 5–7
