= Liza Andriyani =

Indonesian tennis player

- Country (sports): Indonesia
- Residence: Jakarta, Indonesia
- Born: 12 February 1979 (age 47) Tegal, Indonesia
- Height: 1.70 m (5 ft 7 in)
- Turned pro: 1993
- Retired: 2008
- Plays: Right-handed
- Prize money: $41,674

Singles
- Career record: 104–87
- Career titles: 4 ITF
- Highest ranking: No. 345 (27 October 1997)

Doubles
- Career record: 124–70
- Career titles: 14 ITF
- Highest ranking: No. 173 (17 November 1997)
Medal record
Asian Games
Gold medal – first place	2002 Busan	Women's Team

Liza Andriyani (born 12 February 1979) is an Indonesian former tennis player. She made her debut as a professional in May 1993, aged 14, at the Indonesia Open, a then-Tier IV WTA Tour event.

In 1995 and 1996, she appeared in several Grand Slam Junior Championships. Her best result at that level was reaching the 1995 US Open Junior Championships, where she and Tamarine Tanasugarn reached the semifinals.

She was part of the Indonesia Fed Cup team in 1996, 1997, 1999, and 2004. She has a win–loss record of 0–8.

At the 2002 Asian Games, Andriyani also was part of Indonesia's successful women's tennis team.

In 2008, she returned to professional tennis after an absence of four years. With partner Ayu-Fani Damayanti, she won the women's doubles title at the inaugural Garuda Indonesia Tennis Masters.

== ITF Circuit finals ==
Legend
$50,000 tournaments
$25,000 tournaments
$10,000 tournaments

=== Singles: 7 (4 titles, 3 runner-ups) ===
Outcome	No.	Date	Tournament	Surface	Opponent	Score
Winner	1.	11 November 1996	ITF San Salvador, El Salvador	Clay	(Ecuador) María Dolores Campana	6–3, 6–4
Winner	2.	30 June 2002	ITF Edmond, United States	Hard	(United States) Whitney Deason	6–2, 6–3
Winner	3.	18 August 2002	ITF Nakhon Ratchasima, Thailand	Hard	(South Korea) Hong Da-jung	6–4, 7–5
Runner-up	4.	11 May 2003	ITF Surabaya, Indonesia	Clay	(Chinese Taipei) Chuang Chia-jung	3–6, 6–3, 1–6
Runner-up	5.	6 October 2003	ITF Jakarta, Indonesia	Hard	(Thailand) Montinee Tangphong	4–6, 1–6
Runner-up	6.	26 April 2004	ITF Jakarta, Indonesia	Hard	(South Korea) Kim So-jung	2–6, 2–6
Winner	4.	9 May 2004	ITF Jakarta, Indonesia	Hard	(Indonesia) Sandy Gumulya	6–3, 6–2

=== Doubles: 21 (14 titles, 7 runner-ups) ===
Outcome	No.	Date	Tournament	Surface	Partner	Opponents	Score
Winner	1.	16 June 1996	ITF Hilton Head, United States	Hard	(South Africa) Mareze Joubert	(United States) Dawn Buth (United States) Stephanie Nickitas	6–4, 6–4
Runner-up	2.	11 November 1996	ITF San Salvador, El Salvador	Clay	(Colombia) Giana Gutiérrez	(Hungary) Nóra Köves (United Kingdom) Joanne Moore	6–2, 5–7, 6–7^{(1–7)}
Winner	3.	22 June 1997	ITF Mount Pleasant, United States	Hard	(United States) Keirsten Alley	(United States) Amanda Augustus (Norway) Tina Samara	2–6, 6–3, 6–4
Winner	4.	22 November 1998	ITF Manila, Philippines	Hard	(Indonesia) Irawati Iskandar	(Chinese Taipei) Chen Yu-an (Chinese Taipei) Hsu Hsueh-li	2–6, 6–3, 6–3
Runner-up	5.	29 November 1998	ITF Manila, Philippines	Hard	(Indonesia) Irawati Iskandar	(South Korea) Chang Kyung-mi (South Korea) Kim Jin-hee	3–6, 6–7
Winner	6.	18 April 1999	ITF Jakarta, Indonesia	Hard	(Indonesia) Irawati Iskandar	(South Korea) Chang Kyung-mi (Indonesia) Wukirasih Sawondari	6–4, 6–4
Runner-up	7.	13 June 1999	ITF Shenzhen, China	Hard	(Indonesia) Irawati Iskandar	(China) Li Na (China) Li Ting	1–6, 3–6
Winner	8.	18 October 1999	ITF Jakarta, Indonesia	Hard	(Thailand) Benjamas Sangaram	(India) Rushmi Chakravarthi (India) Sai Jayalakshmy Jayaram	6–0, 6–3
Winner	9.	5 November 2000	ITF Jakarta, Indonesia	Hard	(Indonesia) Angelique Widjaja	(South Korea) Kim Jin-hee (South Korea) Chae Kyung-yee	2–4, 5–3, 4–2, 0–4, 4–0
Winner	10.	12 November 2000	ITF Bandung, Indonesia	Hard	(Indonesia) Angelique Widjaja	(India) Rushmi Chakravarthi (India) Sai Jayalakshmy Jayaram	4–1, 4–2, 4–0
Winner	11.	26 May 2002	ITF El Paso, United States	Hard	(Indonesia) Wukirasih Sawondari	(United States) Michelle Dasso (United States) Celena McCoury	6–2, 6–4
Winner	12.	4 June 2002	ITF Hilton Head, United States	Hard	(Indonesia) Wukirasih Sawondari	(United States) Milangela Morales (United States) Shenay Perry	6–2, 6–1
Runner-up	13.	23 June 2002	ITF Dallas, United States	Hard	(Indonesia) Wukirasih Sawondari	(United States) Jessica Lehnhoff (United States) Julie Rotondi	1–6, 1–6
Winner	14.	11 August 2002	ITF Nonthaburi, Thailand	Hard	(Indonesia) Wukirasih Sawondari	(Australia) Gabrielle Baker (Australia) Deanna Roberts	6–3, 7–5
Winner	15.	18 August 2002	ITF Nakhon Ratchasima, Thailand	Hard	(Indonesia) Wukirasih Sawondari	(Thailand) Wilawan Choptang (Malaysia) Khoo Chin-bee	6–2, 6–1
Runner-up	16.	11 May 2003	ITF Surabaya, Indonesia	Clay	(Indonesia) Wukirasih Sawondari	(Chinese Taipei) Chuang Chia-jung (Malaysia) Khoo Chin-bee	1–6, 0–6
Winner	17.	12 October 2003	ITF Jakarta, Indonesia	Hard	(Indonesia) Diana Julianto	(Indonesia) Wukirasih Sawondari (Indonesia) Sandy Gumulya	6–3, 6–3
Runner-up	18.	9 May 2004	ITF Jakarta, Indonesia	Hard	(Thailand) Thassha Vitayaviroj	(Indonesia) Septi Mende (Indonesia) Wukirasih Sawondari	4–6, 3–6
Runner-up	19.	26 September 2004	ITF Jakarta, Indonesia	Hard	(Thailand) Thassha Vitayaviroj	(Chinese Taipei) Chan Yung-jan (Thailand) Pichittra Thongdach	3–6, 4–6
Winner	20.	5 May 2008	ITF Tarakan, Indonesia	Hard	(Indonesia) Ayu-Fani Damayanti	(Australia) Tiffany Welford (Hong Kong) Yang Zi-Jun	6–2, 6–3
Winner	21.	4 August 2008	ITF Jakarta, Indonesia	Hard	(Indonesia) Angelique Widjaja	(South Korea) Kim Jin-hee (Chinese Taipei) Chen Yi	6–3, 6–1
