= Meghha Vakaria =

Indian tennis player

- Country (sports): India
- Born: 28 August 1984 (age 41); Mumbai, India
- Plays: Left-handed (two-handed backhand)
- Prize money: $32,092

Singles
- Career record: 97–78
- Career titles: 2 ITF
- Highest ranking: No. 381 (5 July 2004)

Doubles
- Career record: 63–43
- Career titles: 8 ITF
- Highest ranking: No. 383 (19 July 2004)

Meghha Vakaria (born 28 August 1984) is an Indian former tennis player.

Vakaria has a career-high singles ranking of 381 by the WTA, achieved on 5 July 2004. She also has a career-high WTA doubles ranking of 383, attained on 19 July 2004. She won two singles and eight doubles titles on the ITF Women's Circuit.

Playing for India Fed Cup team, Vakaria has a win–loss record of 2–0.

== ITF finals ==
=== Singles (2–9) ===
Legend $100,000 tournaments $75,000 tournaments $50,000 tournaments $25,000 tournaments $10,000 tournaments	Finals by surface Hard (2–6) Clay (0–1) Grass (0–2) Carpet (0–0)

Outcome	No.	Date	Tournament	Surface	Opponent	Score
Winner	1.	14 May 2000	Indore, India	Hard	(India) Archana Venkataraman	6–4, 7–5
Runner-up	1.	21 May 2000	Indore, India	Hard	(India) Sonal Phadke	1–6, 3–6
Runner-up	2.	2 July 2001	New Delhi, India	Clay	(India) Sheethal Goutham	7–6^{(2)}, 5–7, 6–7^{(1)}
Winner	2.	1 September 2002	Lagos, Nigeria	Hard	(South Africa) Michelle Snyman	7–5, 6–1
Runner-up	3.	23 February 2003	Bangalore, India	Hard	(South Korea) Hong Da-jung	4–6, 4–6
Runner-up	4.	3 August 2003	Harrisonburg, United States	Hard	(India) Shikha Uberoi	1–6, 1–6
Runner-up	5.	17 August 2003	Lagos, Nigeria	Hard	(Malaysia) Khoo Chin-bee	1–6, 2–6
Runner-up	6.	14 September 2003	Bangalore, India	Grass	(Thailand) Suchanun Viratprasert	2–6, 1–6
Runner-up	7.	16 November 2003	Pune, India	Hard	(Uzbekistan) Akgul Amanmuradova	5–7, 3–6
Runner-up	8.	22 February 2004	Benin City, Nigeria	Hard	(South Africa) Chanelle Scheepers	1–6, 3–6
Runner-up	9.	5 February 2006	Muzaffarnagar, India	Grass	(Kyrgyzstan) Ksenia Palkina	2–6, 6–7^{(4)}

=== Doubles (8–4) ===
Outcome	No.	Date	Location	Surface	Partner	Opponents	Score
Runner-up	1.	14 May 2000	Indore, India	Hard	(India) Isha Lakhani	(India) Archana Venkataraman (India) Arthi Venkataraman	3–6, 6–1, 2–6
Winner	1.	21 May 2000	Indore, India	Hard	(India) Isha Lakhani	(India) Sheethal Goutham (India) Liza Pereira Viplav	7–5, 6–2
Winner	2.	1 September 2002	Lagos, Nigeria	Hard	(Thailand) Prariyawan Ratanakrong	(United Kingdom) Megan Emmett (United Kingdom) Annabel Youthed	6–3, 6–0
Winner	3.	8 September 2002	Lagos, Nigeria	Hard	(Thailand) Prariyawan Ratanakrong	(Romania) Nicoleta Scott (Romania) Alexandra Zotta	6–2, 6–0
Winner	4.	10 August 2003	Lagos, Nigeria	Hard	(Malaysia) Khoo Chin-bee	(South Africa) Anca Anastasiu (Belgium) Jennifer Debodt	6–1, 6–2
Winner	5.	17 August 2003	Lagos, Nigeria	Hard	(Malaysia) Khoo Chin-bee	(India) Liza Pereira Viplav (India) Sonal Phadke	6–4, 6–4
Winner	6.	31 August 2003	New Delhi, India	Grass	(Malaysia) Khoo Chin-bee	(India) Shruti Dhawan (India) Sheethal Goutham	6–1, 6–2
Runner-up	2.	8 September 2003	Bangalore, India	Grass	(Malaysia) Khoo Chin-bee	(India) Rushmi Chakravarthi (India) Sai Jayalakshmy Jayaram	2–6, 4–6
Winner	7.	17 January 2004	Hyderabad, India	Hard	(India) Isha Lakhani	(India) Rushmi Chakravarthi (India) Sai Jayalakshmy Jayaram	7–5, 5–7, 6–3
Runner-up	3.	21 May 2005	Indore, India	Hard	(India) Isha Lakhani	(India) Ankita Bhambri (India) Sanaa Bhambri	7–5, 3–6, 2–6
Winner	8.	12 June 2006	New Delhi, India	Hard	(India) Rushmi Chakravarthi	(India) Isha Lakhani (Thailand) Pichittra Thongdach	6–3, 6–4
Runner-up	4.	30 October 2006	Ahmedabad, India	Hard	(India) Tara Iyer	(India) Sanaa Bhambri (India) Rushmi Chakravarthi	2–6, 4–6

== Fed Cup participation ==
=== Doubles ===
Edition	Stage	Date	Location	Against	Surface	Partner	Opponents	W/L	Score
2003 Fed Cup; Asia/Oceania Zone Group II	R/R	21 April 2003	Tokyo, Japan	(Philippines) Philippines	Hard	(India) Isha Lakhani	(Philippines) Czarina-Mae Arévalo (Philippines) Francesca La'O	W	7–5, 6–2
2003 Fed Cup; Asia/Oceania Zone Group II	R/R	22 April 2003	Tokyo, Japan	Kyrgyzstan	Hard	(India) Isha Lakhani	(Kyrgyzstan) Olga Alexeeva (Kyrgyzstan) Kunykei Koichumananova	W	6–0, 6–3

== ITF Junior finals ==
Legend
Category G1
Category G2
Category G3
Category G4
Category G5

=== Singles (3–3) ===
Outcome	No.	Date	Location	Surface	Opponent	Score
Winner	1.	September 2000	Chennai, India	Hard	(Thailand) Pichaya Laosirichon	6–2, 6–2
Runner–up	2.	September 2000	Mumbai, India	Hard	(India) Sania Mirza	5–7, 4–6
Winner	3.	November 2000	Bangkok, Thailand	Hard	(New Zealand) Dianne Hollands	6–1, 6–4
Winner	4.	January 2001	New Delhi, India	Hard	(Thailand) Pichaya Laosirichon	6–3, 6–4
Runner–up	5.	February 2001	Chandigarh, India	Hard	(India) Sania Mirza	4–6, 4–6
Runner–up	6.	October 2001	Bangkok, Thailand	Hard	(Australia) Casey Dellacqua	3–6, 1–6

=== Doubles (2–2) ===
Outcome	No.	Date	Location	Surface	Partner	Opponents	Score
Runner-up	1.	November 1999	Calcutta, India	Hard	(India) Liza Pereira Viplav	(India) Nona Wagh (India) Sonal Phadke	6–2, 3–6, 2–6
Runner-up	2.	September 2000	Mumbai, India	Hard	(India) Liza Pereira Viplav	(India) Sasha Abraham (Canada) Isha Lakhani	6–4, 3–6, 5–7
Winner	3.	November 2000	Bangkok, Thailand	Hard	(India) Liza Pereira Viplav	(Thailand) Rattiya Hiranrat (Thailand) Karamontree Siriluethaiwattana	6–4, 6–3
Winner	4.	September 2001	Chennai, India	Hard	(India) Isha Lakhani	(Indonesia) Diana Julianto (Indonesia) Maya Rosa	4–6, 6–2, 7–6
