= Sanaa Bhambri =

Indian tennis player

- Country (sports): India
- Residence: New Delhi, India
- Born: 7 March 1988 (age 38) New Delhi
- Turned pro: November 2002
- Plays: Left (two-handed backhand)
- College: NC State
- Prize money: $46,738

Singles
- Career record: 121–83
- Career titles: 2 ITF
- Highest ranking: No. 434 (31 October 2005)

Doubles
- Career record: 129–65
- Career titles: 12 ITF
- Highest ranking: No. 298 (31 October 2005)

Sanaa Bhambri (Hindi: सना भाम्बरी; born 7 March 1988) is a former professional tennis player from India. Her highest doubles ranking is world No. 298, which she achieved October 2005. She won one $25k doubles event at Lagos, Nigeria in 2005 and competed in three WTA Tour tournament main draws.

In her career, Bhambri won two singles titles and twelve doubles titles on the ITF Women's Circuit.

== Career ==
A left-hander, Bhambri reached the semifinals of the 2003 French Open girls' doubles event, partnering fellow Indian Sania Mirza.

In October 2005, partnering Ankita Bhambri, Sanaa won a $25k event at Lagos. The sister tandem won both their semifinal and final matches by seeing their opponents withdraw before a point was played.

Her only WTA Tour main-draw appearances were at Kolkata at the Sunfeast Open, in each of the three years that the event was held – 2005, 2006 and 2007. Competing in doubles, Bhambri lost in the first round each time.

Active on tour from 2005 through 2010, competing primarily in events in India and Thailand, Bhambri won twelve $10k tournaments; two in singles (2006 in Ahmedabad and 2008 in Gurgaon) and ten in doubles.

Sanaa won a triple crown at the 2004 DSCL National Championships held in Delhi- in women's singles, women's doubles and girls' under-18s singles. She is the youngest Indian to achieve the feat.

== Personal life ==
Bhambri's sister Ankita and brother Yuki all are or have been tour-level tennis players. She has cousins, Prerna Bhambri and Prateek Bhambri, who also play on the Indian circuit.

== ITF Circuit finals ==
$25,000 tournaments
$10,000 tournaments

=== Singles (2–4) ===
| Outcome | No. | Date | Tournament | Surface | Opponent | Score |
|---|---|---|---|---|---|---|
| Runner-up | 1. | 21 May 2005 | ITF Indore, India | Hard | (India) Isha Lakhani | 1–6, 7–6, 4–6 |
| Winner | 2. | 30 October 2006 | ITF Ahmedabad, India | Hard | (India) Rushmi Chakravarthi | 7–6^{(4)}, 4–6, 6–3 |
| Runner-up | 3. | 19 November 2007 | ITF Aurangabad, India | Clay | (India) Ankita Bhambri | 3–6, 6–7 |
| Winner | 4. | 21 June 2008 | ITF Gurgaon, India | Hard | (South Korea) Han Sung-hee | 7–5, 6–1 |
| Runner-up | 5. | 8 November 2008 | ITF Muzaffarnagar, India | Grass | (Netherlands) Nicole Thyssen | 6–7^{(3)}, 3–6 |
| Runner-up | 6. | 14 September 2009 | ITF New Delhi, India | Hard | (India) Rushmi Chakravarthi | 3–6, 1–6 |

=== Doubles (12–11) ===
| Outcome | No. | Date | Tournament | Surface | Partner | Opponents | Score |
|---|---|---|---|---|---|---|---|
| Winner | 1. | 30 May 2004 | ITF New Delhi, India | Hard | (India) Liza Pereira Viplav | (India) Ankita Bhambri (India) Rushmi Chakravarthi | 6–7, 6–3, 7–6 |
| Runner-up | 2. | 6 December 2004 | ITF Kolkatta, India | Hard | (India) Ankita Bhambri | (Thailand) Wilawan Choptang (India) Shruti Dhawan | 2–6, 5–7 |
| Runner-up | 3. | 13 December 2004 | ITF Gurgaon, India | Clay | (India) Ankita Bhambri | (India) Rushmi Chakravarthi (India) Sai Jayalakshmy Jayaram | 6–2, 2–6, 4–6 |
| Runner-up | 4. | 9 April 2005 | ITF Mumbai, India | Hard | (Romania) Mihaela Buzărnescu | (Chinese Taipei) Chan Chin-wei (Russia) Julia Efremova | 2–6, 1–6 |
| Runner-up | 5. | 9 May 2005 | ITF Ahmedabad, India | Hard | (India) Shruti Dhawan | (India) Ankita Bhambri (India) Sai Jayalakshmy Jayaram | 2–6, 5–7 |
| Winner | 6. | 16 May 2005 | ITF Indore, India | Hard | (India) Ankita Bhambri | (India) Isha Lakhani (India) Meghha Vakaria | 5–7, 6–3, 6–2 |
| Winner | 7. | 9 August 2005 | ITF Hampstead, UK | Hard | (India) Ankita Bhambri | (United Kingdom) Sarah Coles (United Kingdom) Elizabeth Thomas | 6–3, 6–3 |
| Winner | 8. | 17 October 2005 | Lagos Open, Nigeria | Hard | (India) Ankita Bhambri | (India) Rushmi Chakravarthi (India) Punam Reddy | w/o |
| Winner | 9. | 16 June 2006 | ITF New Delhi, India | Hard | (India) Archana Venkataraman | (China) Lu Jingjing (Singapore) Lee Wei-ping | 6–3, 7–6 |
| Runner-up | 10. | 30 October 2006 | Lagos Open, Nigeria | Hard | (India) Rushmi Chakravarthi | (South Africa) Surina De Beer (Romania) Ágnes Szatmári | 3–6, 1–6 |
| Winner | 11. | 30 October 2006 | ITF Ahmedabad, India | Hard | (India) Rushmi Chakravarthi | (India) Tara Iyer (India) Meghha Vakaria | 6–2, 6–4 |
| Runner-up | 12. | 25 May 2007 | ITF Mumbai, India | Hard | (India) Ankita Bhambri | (India) Isha Lakhani (Mauritius) Marinne Giraud | 4–6, 1–6 |
| Winner | 13. | 25 August 2007 | ITF Noida, India | Carpet | (India) Ankita Bhambri | (Thailand) Sophia Mulsap (Thailand) Varatchaya Wongteanchai | 6–1, 6–4 |
| Runner-up | 14. | 19 November 2007 | ITF Aurangabad, India | Clay | (India) Ankita Bhambri | (India) Sandhya Nagaraj (Thailand) Varatchaya Wongteanchai | 6–7^{(4)}, 5–7 |
| Runner-up | 15. | 9 June 2008 | ITF Gurgaon, India | Carpet | (India) Ankita Bhambri | (Russia) Elina Gasanova (India) Isha Lakhani | 3–6, 4–6 |
| Winner | 16. | 23 August 2008 | ITF Khon Kaen, Thailand | Hard | (India) Ankita Bhambri | (Thailand) Nungnadda Wannasuk (Thailand) Kanyapat Narattana | 7–5, 7–6 |
| Winner | 17. | 8 November 2008 | ITF Muzaffarnagar, India | Grass | (India) Rushmi Chakravarthi | (India) Treta Bhattacharyya (India) Shalini Sahoo | 6–1, 6–1 |
| Winner | 18. | 1 June 2009 | ITF New Delhi, India | Hard | (India) Ankita Bhambri | (South Korea) Seo Soon-mi (South Korea) Shin Jung-yoon | 6–4, 2–6, [10–1] |
| Winner | 19. | 10 August 2009 | ITF New Delhi, India | Hard | (India) Poojashree Venkatesha | (India) Rishika Sunkara (India) Nova Patel | 6–2, 6–1 |
| Runner-up | 20. | 5 October 2009 | ITF Noida, India | Hard | (India) Poojashree Venkatesha | (Japan) Miki Miyamura (Japan) Moe Kawatoko | 1–6, 6–4, [5–10] |
| Runner-up | 21. | 5 October 2009 | ITF Pune, India | Hard | (India) Rushmi Chakravarthi | (Japan) Miki Miyamura (Japan) Moe Kawatoko | 0–6, 3–6 |
| Winner | 22. | 17 May 2010 | ITF Durban, South Africa | Hard | (India) Rushmi Chakravarthi | (South Africa) Tegan Edwards (South Africa) Bianca Swanepoel | 3–6, 6–3, 6–4 |
| Runner-up | 23. | 28 May 2010 | ITF Durban, South Africa | Hard | (India) Rushmi Chakravarthi | (Hungary) Blanka Szávay (Austria) Nicole Rottmann | 6–3, 5–7, [9–11] |
