= Wukirasih Sawondari =

Indonesian tennis player

- Country (sports): Indonesia
- Residence: Jakarta, Indonesia
- Born: 20 November 1980 (age 44); Purwokerto, Indonesia
- Height: 1.73 m (5 ft 8 in)
- Turned pro: 1993
- Plays: Right-handed
- Prize money: $32,187

Singles
- Career record: 86–84
- Career titles: 2 ITF
- Highest ranking: No. 405 (19 February 2001)

Doubles
- Career record: 103–64
- Career titles: 11 ITF
- Highest ranking: No. 312 (3 August 1998)
Medal record
Women's tennis
Representing Indonesia
Asian Games
Gold medal – first place	2002 Busan	Team
Women's soft tennis
SEA Games
Gold medal – first place	2011 Jakarta–Palembang	Singles
Gold medal – first place	2011 Jakarta–Palembang	Doubles
Gold medal – first place	2011 Jakarta–Palembang	Team

Wukirasih Sawondari (born 20 November 1980) is an Indonesian former tennis player.

She was coached by Suzanna Wibowo, and made her debut as a professional in December 1993, aged 13, at an ITF tournament in Singapore.

Sawondari was part of Indonesia Fed Cup team in 1997, 1998, 2000, 2001 and 2002.

At the 2002 Asian Games, she was part of Indonesia's successful women's team.

At the 2011 SEA Games, Sawondari represented Indonesia in the sport of soft tennis. She won three gold medals, in women's singles, women's doubles and team.

== ITF finals ==
Legend
$50,000 tournaments
$25,000 tournaments
$10,000 tournaments

=== Singles: 3 (2 titles, 1 runner-up) ===
Result	No.	Date	Location	Surface	Opponent	Score
Win	1.	27 July 1997	Jakarta, Indonesia	Hard	(Indonesia) Irawati Iskandar	6–0, 6–3
Win	2.	18 April 1999	Jakarta, Indonesia	Hard	(Switzerland) Diane Asensio	6–1, 6–4
Loss	3.	23 June 2002	Dallas, United States	Hard	(United States) Jessica Lehnhoff	2–6, 1–6

=== Doubles: 17 (11 titles, 6 runner-ups) ===
Result	No.	Date	Location	Surface	Partner	Opponents	Score
Win	1.	24 August 1997	Samutprakarn, Thailand	Hard	(Indonesia) Wynne Prakusya	(South Korea) Lee Eun-jeong (South Korea) Park Seon-young	6–4, 7–5
Loss	2.	18 April 1999	Jakarta, Indonesia	Hard	(South Korea) Chae Kyung-yee	(Indonesia) Liza Andriyani (Indonesia) Irawati Iskandar	4–6, 4–6
Win	3.	17 October 1999	Jakarta, Indonesia	Hard	(Indonesia) Irawati Iskandar	(Indonesia) Mudarwati Mudarwatı (Indonesia) Dea Sumantri	7–5, 6–3
Loss	4.	27 February 2000	Jakarta, Indonesia	Hard	(Indonesia) Irawati Iskandar	(Indonesia) Yayuk Basuki (Indonesia) Wynne Prakusya	4–6, 2–6
Win	5.	16 July 2000	Jakarta, Indonesia	Hard	(Indonesia) Irawati Iskandar	(South Korea) Chae Kyung-yee (South Korea) Jeon Mi-ra	w/o
Win	6.	16 July 2000	Jakarta, Indonesia	Hard	(South Korea) Jeon Mi-ra	(South Korea) Choi Jin-young (Japan) Akiko Kinebuchi	3–6, 7–5, 7–6^{(7–4)}
Win	7.	26 May 2002	El Paso, United States	Hard	(Indonesia) Liza Andriyani	(United States) Michelle Dasso (United States) Celena McCoury	6–2, 6–4
Win	8.	4 June 2002	Hilton Head, United States	Hard	(Indonesia) Liza Andriyani	(United States) Milangela Morales (United States) Shenay Perry	6–2, 6–1
Loss	9.	22 June 2002	Dallas, United States	Hard	(Indonesia) Liza Andriyani	(United States) Jessica Lehnhoff (United States) Julie Rotondi	1–6, 1–6
Win	10.	11 August 2002	Nonthaburi, Thailand	Hard	(Indonesia) Liza Andriyani	(Australia) Gabrielle Baker (Australia) Deanna Roberts	6–3, 7–5
Win	11.	18 August 2002	Nakhon Ratchasima, Thailand	Hard	(Indonesia) Liza Andriyani	(Thailand) Wilawan Choptang (Malaysia) Khoo Chin-bee	6–2, 6–1
Loss	12.	11 May 2003	Surabaya, Indonesia	Clay	(Indonesia) Liza Andriyani	(Chinese Taipei) Chuang Chia-jung (Malaysia) Khoo Chin-bee	1–6, 0–6
Loss	13.	12 October 2003	Jakarta, Indonesia	Hard	(Indonesia) Sandy Gumulya	(Indonesia) Liza Andriyani (Indonesia) Diana Julianto	3–6, 3–6
Win	14.	2 May 2004	Jakarta, Indonesia	Hard	(Indonesia) Septi Mende	(Japan) Kumiko Iijima (Japan) Mari Inoue	6–2, 6–3
Win	15.	9 May 2004	Jakarta, Indonesia	Hard (i)	(Indonesia) Septi Mende	(Indonesia) Liza Andriyani (Thailand) Thassha Vitayaviroj	6–4, 6–3
Loss	16.	30 April 2005	Jakarta, Indonesia	Hard	(Thailand) Orawan Lamangthong	(Indonesia) Ayu Fani Damayanti (Indonesia) Septi Mende	1–6, 3–6
Win	17.	20 May 2007	Balikpapan, Indonesia	Hard (i)	(Indonesia) Septi Mende	(Indonesia) Lavinia Tananta (Indonesia) Vivien Silfany-Tony	3–6, 6–3, 6–4
