= Hong Da-jung =

South Korean tennis player

- Country (sports): South Korea
- Born: 3 February 1986 (age 39) Seoul, South Korea
- Plays: Right-handed
- Prize money: $22,620

Singles
- Career record: 1 ITF
- Highest ranking: No. 401 (4 Aug 2003)

Doubles
- Career record: 1 ITF
- Highest ranking: No. 491 (20 Sep 2004)

Hong Da-jung (born 3 February 1986) is a South Korean former professional tennis player.

Born in Seoul, Hong was considered a tennis prodigy in South Korea and won the All Korea Junior Championships as a 14-year old. She received training in the United States and reached a best ITF junior world ranking of 26.

Hong, who is short in stature, played for the South Korea Fed Cup team in 2003, winning all three of her singles rubbers.

== ITF finals ==
=== Singles: 2 (1–1) ===
Outcome	Date	Tournament	Surface	Opponent	Score
Runner-up	Aug 2002	ITF Nakhon Ratchasima, Thailand	Hard	(Indonesia) Liza Andriyani	4–6, 5–7
Winner	Feb 2003	ITF Bangalore, India	Hard	(India) Meghha Vakaria	6–4, 6–4

=== Doubles: 1 (1–0) ===
Outcome	Date	Tournament	Surface	Partner	Opponents	Score
Winner	Aug 2008	ITF Gimhae, South Korea	Hard	(South Korea) Kim Jin-hee	(South Korea) Kim Sun-jung (South Korea) Lee Cho-won	6–4, 6–2
