= Sarah Adegoke =

Nigerian tennis player (born 1997)

- Country (sports): Nigeria
- Born: 16 July 1997 (age 28)
- Plays: Right-handed (two–handed backhand)

Singles
- Career record: 1–8

Doubles
- Career record: 1–10
- Highest ranking: No. 874 (31 Dec 2018)
- Last updated on: 6 March 2019.

Sarah Adegoke (born 1997) is an inactive Nigerian tennis player. She is currently the highest ranked tennis player in women's singles according to Nigeria Tennis Federation.

== Career ==
Brought up in Ibadan, Oyo State, Adegoke learnt to play tennis through her father, Adedapo Adegoke, whom she noted was not professionally trained but read sporting articles and magazines to tutor her on the laws of the game. She began representing Nigeria in 2010, and by 2014 was the highest ranked woman in Nigerian tennis. She describes Serena Williams as her biggest motivation in the game. Adegoke was the first runner-up in the senior women's category at the 34th edition of the CBN Tennis Open Championship in 2012. She is also one of few Nigerians to have gotten to the finals of the Governor's Cup Lagos Tennis, a feat she accomplished in 2014, losing to Zarah Razafimahatratra of Madagascar in the last game. At the 2014 Ikoyi Club Masters Tennis Championship, Adegoke who was 16 at the time, caused an upset when she won the 2013 CBN Tennis Open Championship winner, Ronke Akingbade in the women's single final.

In February 2017, she won the Ikoyi Club Masters Tennis Championship. Later in the year, she won the senior women's single category at the 39th CBN Tennis Open Championship, defeating Marylove Edwards. By December 2017, she defeated rival, Blessing Samuel, 6–3, 6–3 to win the Rainoil Tennis Open at the Lagos Country Club.

In August 2018, she was ranked first and third in the singles and doubles category according to the Nigeria Tennis Federation.
