= Ankita Bhambri =

Indian tennis player

- Native name: अंकिता भाम्बरी
- Country (sports): India
- Born: 28 October 1986 (age 39) New Delhi
- Turned pro: 2000
- Plays: Right-handed (two-handed backhand)
- Prize money: $62,691

Singles
- Career record: 162–91
- Career titles: 9 ITF
- Highest ranking: No. 332 (1 May 2006)

Doubles
- Career record: 100–69
- Career titles: 9 ITF
- Highest ranking: No. 299 (31 October 2005)

Ankita Bhambri (Hindi: अंकिता भाम्बरी; born 28 October 1986) is an Indian former professional tennis player and coach.

Her career-high singles ranking is world No. 332, which she achieved in May 2006. Her highest doubles ranking is world No. 299, which she reached in October 2005. She was the non-playing captain of the India Fed Cup team in 2018 and coach of the Indian Team in 2019 and 2020. She was also the captain/coach of the Indian Tennis team for the Asian Games in 2018 and 2023.

In her career, Bhambri won a total of nine singles and nine doubles titles at tournaments of the ITF Circuit. She has played on the WTA Tour on five occasions, losing in round one at Hyderabad (2004), Hyderabad & Kolkata (2005), and Bangalore & Kolkata (2006).

Playing for India Fed Cup team, Bhambri has a win–loss record of 8–14.

== ITF Circuit finals ==
Legend
$50,000 tournaments
$25,000 tournaments
$10,000 tournaments

=== Singles: 18 (9–9) ===
Outcome	No.	Date	Tournament	Surface	Opponent	Score
Winner	1.	22 April 2002	ITF Pune, India	Clay	(India) Sheethal Goutham	6–3, 6–2
Runner-up	2.	27 May 2002	ITF Mumbai, India	Carpet	(India) Sheethal Goutham	4–6, 6–2, 4–6
Runner-up	3.	12 May 2003	ITF New Delhi, India	Hard	(India) Liza Pereira Viplav	4–6, 6–4, 2–6
Winner	4.	26 May 2003	ITF New Delhi, India	Hard	(India) Isha Lakhani	6–3, 6–3
Runner-up	5.	23 May 2004	ITF Lucknow, India	Grass	(India) Rushmi Chakravarthi	2–6, 6–2, 6–7
Runner-up	6.	30 May 2004	ITF New Delhi, India	Hard	(India) Rushmi Chakravarthi	4–6, 4–6
Winner	7.	6 December 2004	ITF Kolkatta, India	Hard	(Thailand) Wilawan Choptang	6–3, 7–5
Runner-up	8.	13 December 2004	ITF Gurgaon, India	Clay	(India) Rushmi Chakravarthi	7–6, 6–7, 4–6
Runner-up	9.	9 May 2005	ITF Ahmedabad, India	Hard	(China) Sun Shengnan	2–6, 2–6
Winner	10.	7 November 2005	ITF Pune, India	Clay	(India) Parul Goswami	6–1, 6–3
Winner	11.	23 January 2006	ITF New Delhi, India	Hard	(Kyrgyzstan) Ksenia Palkina	6–4, 6–3
Winner	12.	27 March 2006	ITF Mumbai, India	Clay	(Japan) Kazusa Ito	6–2, 5–7, 6–1
Winner	13.	12 June 2006	ITF New Delhi, India	Hard	(India) Isha Lakhani	6–3, 6–2
Runner-up	14.	25 August 2007	ITF Noida, India	Carpet	(India) Tara Iyer	6–3, 4–6, 3–6
Winner	15.	19 November 2007	ITF Aurangabad, India	Clay	(India) Sanaa Bhambri	6–3, 7–6
Runner-up	16.	9 June 2008	ITF Gurgaon, India	Carpet	(India) Rushmi Chakravarthi	4–6, 2–6
Runner-up	17.	18 October 2008	Lagos Open, Nigeria	Hard	(Belgium) Tamaryn Hendler	3–6, 6–2, 3–6
Winner	18.	1 June 2009	ITF New Delhi, India	Hard	(China) He Chunyan	6–3, 6–2

=== Doubles: 17 (9–8) ===
Outcome	No.	Date	Tournament	Surface	Partner	Opponents	Score
Runner-up	1.	16 June 2002	ITF Mumbai, India	Clay	(India) Sonal Phadke	(India) Shruti Dhawan (India) Sheethal Goutham	3–6, 6–2, 3–6
Winner	2.	1 June 2003	ITF New Delhi, India	Clay	(India) Sonal Phadke	(India) Shruti Dhawan (India) Sheethal Goutham	7–6^{(3)}, 6–0
Winner	3.	23 May 2004	ITF Lucknow, India	Grass	(India) Rushmi Chakravarthi	(India) Sai Jayalakshmy Jayaram (India) Archana Venkataraman	6–4, 6–1
Runner-up	4.	30 May 2004	ITF New Delhi, India	Hard	(India) Rushmi Chakravarthi	(India) Sanaa Bhambri (India) Liza Pereira Viplav	7–6, 3–6, 6–7
Runner-up	5.	6 December 2004	ITF Kolkatta, India	Hard	(India) Sanaa Bhambri	(Thailand) Wilawan Choptang (India) Shruti Dhawan	2–6, 5–7
Runner-up	6.	13 December 2004	ITF Gurgaon, India	Clay	(India) Sanaa Bhambri	(India) Rushmi Chakravarthi (India) Sai Jayalakshmy Jayaram	6–2, 2–6, 4–6
Winner	7.	9 May 2005	ITF Ahmedabad, India	Hard	(India) Sai Jayalakshmy Jayaram	(India) Sanaa Bhambri (India) Shruti Dhawan	6–2, 7–5
Winner	8.	16 May 2005	ITF Indore, India	Hard	(India) Sanaa Bhambri	(India) Isha Lakhani (India) Meghha Vakaria	5–7, 6–3, 6–2
Winner	9.	9 August 2005	ITF London, United Kingdom	Hard	(India) Sanaa Bhambri	(United Kingdom) Sarah Coles (United Kingdom) Elizabeth Thomas	6–3, 6–3
Winner	10.	17 October 2005	Lagos Open, Nigeria	Hard	(India) Sanaa Bhambri	(India) Rushmi Chakravarthi (India) Punam Reddy	w/o
Runner-up	11.	23 January 2006	ITF New Delhi, India	Hard	(India) Rushmi Chakravarthi	(Kyrgyzstan) Ksenia Palkina (Italy) Nicole Clerico	w/o
Runner-up	12.	25 May 2007	ITF Mumbai, India	Hard	(India) Sanaa Bhambri	(India) Isha Lakhani (Mauritius) Marinne Giraud	4–6, 1–6
Winner	13.	25 August 2007	ITF Noida, India	Carpet	(India) Sanaa Bhambri	(Thailand) Sophia Mulsap (Thailand) Varatchaya Wongteanchai	6–1, 6–4
Runner-up	14.	19 November 2007	ITF Aurangabad, India	Clay	(India) Sanaa Bhambri	(India) Sandhya Nagaraj (Thailand) Varatchaya Wongteanchai	6–7^{(4)}, 5–7
Runner-up	15.	9 June 2008	ITF Gurgaon, India	Carpet	(India) Sanaa Bhambri	(Russia) Elina Gasanova (India) Isha Lakhani	3–6, 4–6
Winner	16.	23 August 2008	ITF Khon Kaen, Thailand	Hard	(India) Sanaa Bhambri	(Thailand) Nungnadda Wannasuk (Thailand) Kanyapat Narattana	7–5, 7–6
Winner	17.	1 June 2009	ITF New Delhi, India	Hard	(India) Sanaa Bhambri	(South Korea) Seo Soon-mi (South Korea) Shin Jung-yoon	6–4, 2–6, [10–1]

== Personal life ==
Ankita's sister Sanaa, brother Yuki and cousins Prerna and Prateek Bhambri also play tennis professionally.
