= Diana Julianto =

Indonesian tennis player

- Country (sports): Indonesia
- Residence: Bandung, Indonesia
- Born: 14 February 1984 (age 41); Bandung
- Height: 1.60 m (5 ft 3 in)
- Turned pro: 2000
- Prize money: $7,818

Singles
- Career record: 30–41
- Career titles: 0
- Highest ranking: No. 537 (16 February 2004)

Doubles
- Career record: 28–30
- Career titles: 0 WTA, 1 ITF
- Highest ranking: No. 415 (12 April 2004)

Diana Julianto (born 14 February 1984) is an Indonesian former tennis player.

She made her debut as a professional in November 2000, aged 14, at an ITF tournament in Jakarta. In doubles, she won one tournament, an ITF event at Jakarta in 2003.

Julianto was part of Indonesia's Fed Cup team in 2002.

== ITF Circuit finals ==
=== Doubles (1–0) ===
$25,000 tournaments
$10,000 tournaments

Result	Date	Tournament	Surface	Partner	Opponents	Score
Win	12 October 2003	Jakarta, Indonesia	Hard	(Indonesia) Liza Andriyani	(Indonesia) Wukirasih Sawondari (Indonesia) Sandy Gumulya	6–3, 6–3
