= Montinee Tangphong =

Thai tennis player (1985–2020)

Montinee Tangphong มณฑินี ตั้งพงษ์
- Country (sports): Thailand
- Born: 30 April 1985 Samut Sakhon, Thailand
- Died: 4 November 2020 (aged 35) Samut Sakhon
- Turned pro: 2002
- Retired: 2010
- Plays: Right-handed (two-handed backhand)
- Prize money: $75,703

Singles
- Career record: 145–157
- Career titles: 2 ITF
- Highest ranking: No. 272 (29 May 2006)

Doubles
- Career record: 72–101
- Career titles: 2 ITF
- Highest ranking: No. 223 (30 October 2006)
Medal record
Southeast Asian Games
Bronze medal – third place	2005 Manila	Women's doubles
Bronze medal – third place	2005 Manila	Mixed doubles
Silver medal – second place	2005 Manila	Team

Montinee Tangphong (Thai: มณฑินี ตั้งพงษ์; 30 April 1985 – 4 November 2020) was a Thai professional tennis player.

She won two singles and two doubles titles on tournaments of the ITF Women's Circuit and took part in many WTA Tour events. Her career-high singles ranking is No. 272, achieved on 29 May 2006.

== ITF finals ==
$50,000 tournaments
$25,000 tournaments
$10,000 tournaments

=== Singles: 6 (2–4) ===
Outcome	No.	Date	Tournament	Surface	Opponent	Score
Winner	1.	6 October 2003	ITF Jakarta, Indonesia	Hard	(Indonesia) Liza Andriyani	6–4, 6–1
Winner	2.	19 January 2004	ITF New Delhi, India	Hard	(India) Isha Lakhani	2–6, 6–2, 6–3
Runner-up	3.	21 August 2004	ITF Colombo, Sri Lanka	Clay	(Chinese Taipei) Chan Yung-jan	1–6, 1–6
Runner-up	4.	1 November 2004	ITF Mumbai, India	Hard	(Czech Republic) Hana Šromová	2–6, 1–6
Runner-up	5.	9 April 2005	ITF Mumbai, India	Hard	(Chinese Taipei) Chan Chin-wei	2–6, 3–6
Runner-up	6.	23 May 2005	ITF Phuket, Thailand	Hard	(Japan) Ryōko Fuda	1–6, 4–6

=== Doubles: 6 (2–4) ===
Outcome	No.	Date	Tournament	Surface	Partner	Opponents	Score
Winner	1.	9 November 2003	ITF Pune, India	Hard	(Thailand) Thassha Vitayaviroj	(India) Geeta Manohar (India) Archana Venkataraman	4–6, 7–5, 6–4
Winner	2.	19 January 2004	ITF New Delhi, India	Hard	(Thailand) Thassha Vitayaviroj	(Japan) Satomi Kinjo (Japan) Tomoyo Takagishi	3–6, 6–0, 6–3
Runner-up	3.	30 August 2004	ITF New Delhi, India	Hard	(Thailand) Thassha Vitayaviroj	(India) Rushmi Chakravarthi (India) Sai Jayalakshmy Jayaram	w/o
Runner-up	4.	28 August 2006	ITF Guangzhou, China	Hard	(Japan) Ayami Takase	(China) Chen Yanchong (China) Ren Jing	2–6, 7–5, 6–4
Runner-up	5.	17 September 2006	ITF Hiroshima, Japan	Carpet	(Japan) Maki Arai	(Japan) Yuka Kuroda (Japan) Eriko Mizuno	1–6, 4–6
Runner-up	6.	9 October 2006	Lagos Open, Nigeria	Hard	(Switzerland) Lisa Sabino	(Romania) Magda Mihalache (Germany) Laura Siegemund	3–6, 3–6
