= Radhika Tulpule =

Indian tennis player

- Country (sports): India
- Born: 9 February 1982 (age 43); Pune, India
- Plays: Right-handed (two-handed backhand)
- Prize money: $16,397

Singles
- Career record: 48–43
- Career titles: 6 ITF
- Highest ranking: No. 473 (17 September 2001)

Doubles
- Career record: 43–41
- Career titles: 6 ITF
- Highest ranking: No. 438 (14 April 2003)

Radhika Tulpule (born 9 February 1982) is an Indian former professional tennis player.

Tulpule has a career-high singles ranking by the WTA of 473, achieved on 17 September 2001. She also has a career-high WTA doubles ranking of 438, attained on 14 April 2003. In her career, Tulpule won six singles and six doubles titles on the ITF Women's Circuit.

Playing for India Fed Cup team, she has a win–loss record of 1–0.

== ITF finals ==
=== Singles (6–0) ===
Legend $100,000 tournaments $75,000 tournaments $50,000 tournaments $25,000 tournaments $10,000 tournaments	Finals by surface Hard (2–0) Clay (3–0) Grass (0–0) Carpet (1–0)

Outcome	No.	Date	Tournament	Surface	Opponent	Score
Winner	1.	17 April 1999	Mumbai, India	Hard	(India) Sai Jayalakshmy Jayaram	6–3, 6–2
DNP	–	17 September 2000	Bangalore, India	Clay	(India) Rushmi Chakravarthi	—
Winner	2.	25 March 2001	New Delhi, India	Hard	(India) Sonal Phadke	6–4, 7–6^{(5)}
Winner	3.	29 April 2001	Pune, India	Hard	(India) Archana Venkataraman	4–6, 6–3, 7–6^{(7)}
Winner	4.	9 September 2001	Chennai, India	Clay	(Turkey) İpek Şenoğlu	6–1, 7–6^{(2)}
Winner	5.	27 April 2002	New Delhi, India	Clay	(India) Isha Lakhani	7–6^{(4)}, 6–1
Winner	6.	23 June 2002	New Delhi, India	Carpet	(India) Sheethal Goutham	6–2, 6–4

=== Doubles (6–5) ===
Outcome	No.	Date	Tournament	Surface	Partner	Opponents	Score
Runner-up	1.	17 April 2000	New Delhi, India	Carpet	(India) Rushmi Chakravarthi	(India) Sai Jayalakshmy Jayaram (India) Nirupama Sanjeev	4–6, 2–6
Runner-up	2.	16 April 2001	Chandigarh, India	Hard	(Indonesia) Dea Sumantri	(India) Rushmi Chakravarthi (India) Sai Jayalakshmy Jayaram	1–6, 5–7
Runner-up	3.	19 September 2001	New Delhi, India	Hard	(India) Shruti Dhawan	(India) Rushmi Chakravarthi (India) Sai Jayalakshmy Jayaram	7–6^{(5)}, 4–6, 4–6
Winner	4.	1 April 2002	New Delhi, India	Hard	(India) Sai Jayalakshmy Jayaram	(India) Samrita Sekar (India) Archana Venkataraman	6–7^{(8)}, 6–4, 6–1
Winner	5.	8 April 2002	New Delhi, India	Hard	(India) Sai Jayalakshmy Jayaram	(India) Samrita Sekar (India) Archana Venkataraman	7–5, 6–0
Winner	6.	15 April 2002	New Delhi, India	Hard	(India) Sai Jayalakshmy Jayaram	(India) Samrita Sekar (India) Archana Venkataraman	6–2, 6–2
Winner	7.	22 April 2002	New Delhi, India	Clay	(India) Sai Jayalakshmy Jayaram	(India) Samrita Sekar (India) Archana Venkataraman	5–7, 6–1, 6–4
Winner	8.	27 May 2002	Mumbai, India	Carpet	(India) Liza Pereira Viplav	(India) Shruti Dhawan (India) Sheethal Goutham	7–6^{(6)}, 6–4
Runner-up	9.	23 June 2002	Mumbai, India	Carpet	(India) Liza Pereira Viplav	(India) Shruti Dhawan (India) Sheethal Goutham	1–6, 2–6
Winner	10.	17 November 2002	Manila, Philippines	Hard	(India) Sania Mirza	(China) Dong Yanhua (China) Zhang Yao	6–4, 6–3
Runner-up	11.	8 December 2002	Pune, India	Hard	(India) Sania Mirza	(Uzbekistan) Akgul Amanmuradova (Ukraine) Kateryna Bondarenko	3–6, 6–7^{(1)}

== Fed Cup participation ==
=== Doubles ===
Edition	Stage	Date	Location	Against	Surface	Partner	Opponents	W/L	Score
2000 Fed Cup; Asia/Oceania Zone Group I	R/R	27 April 2000	Osaka, Japan	(Kazakhstan) Kazakhstan	Hard	(India) Manisha Malhotra	(Kazakhstan) Valeria Khazova (Kazakhstan) Alissa Velts	W	7–6^{(5)}, 6–4
