= Wilawan Choptang =

Thai tennis player

- Country (sports): Thailand
- Born: 18 April 1984 (age 41) Songkhla, Thailand
- Turned pro: 1996
- Retired: 2007
- Plays: Right-handed (two-handed backhand)
- Prize money: $24,270

Singles
- Career record: 73–83
- Career titles: 0
- Highest ranking: No. 518 (24 October 2005)

Doubles
- Career record: 69–64
- Career titles: 3 ITF
- Highest ranking: No. 321 (3 April 2006)

Team competitions
- Fed Cup: 1–2
Medal record
Southeast Asian Games
Bronze medal – third place	2003 Ho Chi Minh City	Doubles
Gold medal – first place	2003 Ho Chi Minh City	Women's team

Wilawan Choptang (born 18 April 1984) is a former professional tennis player from Thailand.

She has career-high WTA rankings of 518 in singles, achieved on 24 October 2005, and 321 in doubles, set on 3 April 2006. Choptang won three doubles titles on the ITF Women's Circuit.

Her only WTA Tour main-draw appearance came at the 2002 Pattaya Open, where she partnered with Suchanun Viratprasert in the doubles event.

Playing for Thailand Fed Cup team, Choptang has a win–loss record of 1–2.

== ITF Circuit finals ==
=== Singles (0–1) ===
Result	No.	Date	Tournament	Surface	Opponent	Score
Loss	1.	6 December 2004	ITF Kolkatta, India	Hard	(India) Ankita Bhambri	3–6, 5–7

=== Doubles (3–4) ===
Result	No.	Date	Tournament	Surface	Partner	Opponents	Score
Loss	1.	12 August 2002	ITF Nakhon Ratchasima, Thailand	Hard	(Malaysia) Khoo Chin-bee	(Indonesia) Liza Andriyani (Indonesia) Wukirasih Sawondari	2–6, 1–6
Win	2.	16 September 2002	ITF Hyderabad, India	Hard	(Malaysia) Khoo Chin-bee	(India) Shruti Dhawan (India) Sheethal Goutham	6–2, 6–2
Loss	3.	5 October 2003	ITF Jakarta, Indonesia	Hard	(India) Shruti Dhawan	(Indonesia) Septi Mende (Indonesia) Maya Rosa	6–7^{(6)}, 4–6
Loss	4.	24 October 2004	ITF Pune, India	Hard	(Thailand) Thassha Vitayaviroj	(Uzbekistan) Akgul Amanmuradova (India) Sai Jayalakshmy Jayaram	3–6, 6–4, 3–6
Win	5.	6 December 2004	ITF Kolkatta, India	Hard	(India) Shruti Dhawan	(India) Ankita Bhambri (India) Sanaa Bhambri	6–2, 7–5
Win	6.	30 October 2005	ITF Mumbai, India	Hard	(Thailand) Thassha Vitayaviroj	(Italy) Nicole Clerico (Kyrgyzstan) Ksenia Palkina	5–7, 7–5, 6–3
Loss	7.	30 July 2006	ITF Bangkok, Thailand	Hard	(Thailand) Thassha Vitayaviroj	(Indonesia) Ayu Fani Damayanti (Thailand) Nudnida Luangnam	2–6, 2–6
