= Thassha Vitayaviroj =

Thai tennis player (born 1986)

- Country (sports): Thailand
- Born: 10 June 1986 (age 39) Ubon Ratchathani, Thailand
- Turned pro: 2001
- Retired: 2007
- Plays: Right-handed (two-handed backhand)
- Prize money: $24,399

Singles
- Career record: 73–83
- Highest ranking: No. 439 (2 May 2005)

Doubles
- Career record: 78–72
- Career titles: 5 ITF
- Highest ranking: No. 320 (24 April 2006)
Medal record
Southeast Asian Games
| Bronze medal – third place | 2005 Manila | Doubles |
| Silver medal – second place | 2005 Manila | Team |

Thassha Vitayaviroj (Thai: ธัชชา วิทยวิโรจน์; 10 June 1986) is a former professional Thai tennis player.

Vitayaviroj has career-high WTA rankings of 439 in singles, achieved on 2 May 2005, and 320 in doubles, set on 24 April 2006. She won five doubles titles on the ITF Women's Circuit. Her only WTA Tour main-draw appearance came at the 2002 Volvo Women's Open, where she partnered with Montinee Tangphong in the doubles event.

Playing for Thailand Fed Cup team, Vitayaviroj has a win–loss record of 0–1.

== ITF finals ==
$10,000 tournaments

=== Singles (0–1) ===
| Result | Date | Tournament | Surface | Opponent | Score |
|---|---|---|---|---|---|
| Loss | 3 October 2004 | Balikpapan, Indonesia | Hard | (Thailand) Napaporn Tongsalee | 4–6, 5–7 |

=== Doubles (5–7) ===
| Result | No. | Date | Tournament | Surface | Partner | Opponents | Score |
|---|---|---|---|---|---|---|---|
| Win | 1. | 9 November 2003 | Pune, India | Hard | (Thailand) Montinee Tangphong | (India) Geeta Manohar (India) Archana Venkataraman | 4–6, 7–5, 6–4 |
| Win | 2. | 19 January 2004 | New Delhi, India | Hard | (Thailand) Montinee Tangphong | (Japan) Satomi Kinjo (Japan) Tomoyo Takagishi | 3–6, 6–0, 6–3 |
| Loss | 1. | 9 May 2004 | Jakarta, Indonesia | Hard | (Indonesia) Liza Andriyani | (Indonesia) Septi Mende (Indonesia) Wukirasih Sawondari | 4–6, 3–6 |
| Loss | 2. | 30 August 2004 | New Delhi, India | Hard | (Thailand) Montinee Tangphong | (India) Rushmi Chakravarthi (India) Sai Jayalakshmy Jayaram | w/o |
| Loss | 3. | 26 September 2004 | Jakarta, Indonesia | Hard | (Indonesia) Liza Andriyani | (Chinese Taipei) Latisha Chan (Thailand) Pichittra Thongdach | 3–6, 4–6 |
| Loss | 4. | 24 October 2004 | Pune, India | Hard | (Thailand) Wilawan Choptang | (Uzbekistan) Akgul Amanmuradova (India) Sai Jayalakshmy Jayaram | 3–6, 6–4, 3–6 |
| Win | 3. | 30 October 2005 | Mumbai, India | Hard | (Thailand) Wilawan Choptang | (Italy) Nicole Clerico (Kyrgyzstan) Ksenia Palkina | 5–7, 7–5, 6–3 |
| Winner | 4. | 1 April 2006 | Mumbai, India | Hard | (Thailand) Nudnida Luangnam | (United Kingdom) Natasha Khan (United Kingdom) Claire Peterzan | 3–3 ret. |
| Runner-up | 5. | 8 April 2006 | Chennai, India | Clay | (Thailand) Nudnida Luangnam | (South Korea) Cho Jeong-a (South Korea) Kim Ji-young | 4–6, 4–6 |
| Runner-up | 6. | 30 July 2006 | Bangkok, Thailand | Hard | (Thailand) Wilawan Choptang | (Indonesia) Ayu Fani Damayanti (Thailand) Nudnida Luangnam | 2–6, 2–6 |
| Win | 5. | 12 November 2006 | Manila, Philippines | Hard | (Chinese Taipei) Kao Shao-yuan | (South Korea) Kim Jung-eun (South Korea) Lim Sae-mi | 6–2, 7–5 |
| Loss | 7. | 19 November 2006 | Manila, Philippines | Hard | (Chinese Taipei) Kao Shao-yuan | (Thailand) Noppawan Lertcheewakarn (Thailand) Varatchaya Wongteanchai | 6–3, 3–6, 6–7^{(2)} |

== Fed Cup participation ==
=== Doubles ===
| Edition | Stage | Date | Location | Against | Surface | Partner | Opponents | W/L | Score |
|---|---|---|---|---|---|---|---|---|---|
| 2006 Fed Cup; 2006 Fed Cup World Group II Play-offs | P/O | 16 July 2006 | Bratislava, Slovakia | Slovakia | Hard (i) | (Thailand) Nudnida Luangnam | (Slovakia) Janette Husárová (Slovakia) Magdaléna Rybáriková | L | 2–6, 3–6 |
