= Sonal Phadke =

Indian tennis player

- Country (sports): India
- Born: 9 June 1982 (age 43); Mumbai, India
- Plays: Right-handed (two-handed both sides)
- Prize money: $31,270

Singles
- Career record: 109–110
- Career titles: 0 WTA, 7 ITF
- Highest ranking: No. 427 (16 April 2001)

Doubles
- Career record: 63–94
- Career titles: 0 WTA, 2 ITF
- Highest ranking: No. 413 (27 August 2001)

Team competitions
- Fed Cup: 0–2

Sonal Phadke (born 9 June 1982) is an Indian former tennis player.

Phadke has a career-high singles ranking by the Women's Tennis Association (WTA) of 427, reached on 16 April 2001. She also has a career-high WTA doubles ranking of 413, achieved August 2001. Phadke won seven singles and two doubles titles on the ITF Women's Circuit.

Playing for India Fed Cup team, Phadke has a win–loss record of 0–2.

== ITF finals ==
=== Singles (7–4) ===
Legend $100,000 tournaments $75,000 tournaments $50,000 tournaments $25,000 tournaments $10,000 tournaments	Finals by surface Hard (2–3) Clay (5–0) Grass (0–0) Carpet (0–1)

Outcome	No.	Date	Tournament	Surface	Opponent	Score
Runner-up	1.	10 April 2000	Mumbai, India	Carpet	(India) Sai Jayalakshmy Jayaram	2–6, 3–6
Winner	2.	8 May 2000	Indore, India	Hard	(India) Archana Venkataraman	5–7, 6–4, 7–6^{(5)}
Runner-up	3.	15 May 2000	Indore, India	Hard	(India) Archana Venkataraman	4–6, 4–6
Winner	4.	21 May 2000	Indore, India	Hard	(India) Meghha Vakaria	6–1, 6–3
Runner-up	5.	12 February 2001	New Delhi, India	Hard	(India) Archana Venkataraman	6–4, 2–6, 5–7
Runner-up	6.	25 March 2001	New Delhi, India	Hard	(India) Radhika Tulpule	4–6, 6–7^{(5)}
Winner	7.	21 May 2000	Mumbai, India	Clay	(India) Samrita Sekar	4–6, 6–2, 6–3
Winner	8.	2 June 2001	Mumbai, India	Clay	(India) Samrita Sekar	4–6, 6–2, 6–3
Winner	9.	16 June 2001	Mumbai, India	Clay	(India) Samrita Sekar	6–1, 7–5
Winner	10.	1 June 2003	New Delhi, India	Clay	(India) Liza Pereira Viplav	6–4, 6–4
Winner	11.	17 August 2003	Lagos, Nigeria	Clay	(South Africa) Michelle Snyman	6–4, 6–2

=== Doubles (2–8) ===
Outcome	No.	Date	Tournament	Surface	Partner	Opponents	Score
Runner-up	1.	4 March 2001	New Delhi, India	Carpet	(India) Radhika Mandke	(India) Sheethal Goutham (India) Liza Pereira Viplav	3–6, 5–7
Runner-up	2.	29 April 2001	Pune, India	Hard	(India) Sania Mirza	(India) Rushmi Chakravarthi (India) Sai Jayalakshmy Jayaram	2–6, 0–6
Runner-up	3.	2 June 2001	Mumbai, India	Clay	(India) Karishma Patel	(India) Sheethal Goutham (India) Liza Pereira Viplav	4–6, 3–6
Runner-up	4.	9 June 2001	Mumbai, India	Clay	(India) Karishma Patel	(India) Sheethal Goutham (India) Liza Pereira Viplav	3–6, 5–7
Runner-up	5.	16 June 2001	Mumbai, India	Clay	(India) Karishma Patel	(India) Sheethal Goutham (India) Liza Pereira Viplav	4–6, 1–6
Runner-up	6.	16 June 2002	Mumbai, India	Clay	(India) Ankita Bhambri	(India) Shruti Dhawan (India) Sheethal Goutham	3–6, 6–2, 3–6
Winner	7.	1 June 2003	New Delhi, India	Clay	(India) Ankita Bhambri	(India) Shruti Dhawan (India) Sheethal Goutham	7–6^{(3)}, 6–0
Runner-up	8.	17 August 2003	Lagos, Nigeria	Hard	(India) Liza Pereira Viplav	(Malaysia) Khoo Chin-bee (India) Meghha Vakaria	4–6, 4–6
Runner-up	9.	26 February 2006	Benin City, Nigeria	Hard	(Germany) Jessica Weyreuter	(Belgium) Davinia Lobbinger (Germany) Diana Vrânceanu	5–7, 2–6
Winner	10.	5 March 2006	Benin City, Nigeria	Hard	(Germany) Jessica Weyreuter	(Belgium) Davinia Lobbinger (Germany) Diana Vrânceanu	7–6^{(4)}, 6–2
