= Isha Lakhani =

Indian tennis player

- Country (sports): India
- Residence: Mumbai
- Born: 29 April 1985 (age 41) Mumbai
- Turned pro: 2001
- Plays: Left-handed (two-handed backhand)
- Prize money: $60,736

Singles
- Career record: 150–93
- Career titles: 4 ITF
- Highest ranking: No. 291 (19 May 2008)

Doubles
- Career record: 80–66
- Career titles: 7 ITF
- Highest ranking: No. 371 (1 December 2008)

Isha Lakhani (born 29 April 1985) is an Indian former professional tennis player.

== Biography ==
Lakhani was born in Mumbai. Her career high in singles is world No. 291, achieved on 19 May 2008. In doubles, she peaked at No. 371 on 1 December 2008.

In her career, she won four singles and seven doubles titles on the ITF Women's Circuit.

Playing for India Fed Cup team, Lakhani has a win–loss record of 9–4.

== ITF Circuit finals ==
=== Singles: 12 (4–8) ===
Legend $75,000 tournaments $50,000 tournaments $25,000 tournaments $10,000 tournaments	Finals by surface Hard (3–8) Clay (1–0) Grass (0–0) Carpet (0–0)

Outcome	No.	Date	Tournament	Surface	Opponent	Score
Runner-up	1.	26 May 2003	ITF New Delhi, India	Hard	(India) Ankita Bhambri	3–6, 3–6
Winner	2.	14 August 2003	ITF Nakhon Ratchasima, Thailand	Hard	(South Korea) Kim Jin-hee	6–4, 2–6, 6–3
Runner-up	3.	9 November 2003	ITF Mumbai, India	Hard	(Uzbekistan) Akgul Amanmuradova	2–6, 3–6
Runner-up	4.	19 January 2004	ITF New Delhi, India	Hard	(Thailand) Montinee Tangphong	6–2, 2–6, 3–6
Winner	5.	21 May 2005	ITF Indore, India	Hard	(India) Sanaa Bhambri	6–1, 6–7^{(3)}, 6–4
Winner	6.	29 October 2005	ITF Mumbai, India	Hard	(India) Punam Reddy	6–4, 4–6, 6–2
Runner-up	7.	6 November 2005	ITF Pune, India	Hard	(United Kingdom) Naomi Cavaday	4–6, 1–6
Runner-up	8.	12 June 2006	ITF New Delhi, India	Hard	(India) Ankita Bhambri	3–6, 2–6
Runner-up	9.	13 July 2007	ITF Khon Kaen, Thailand	Hard	(Uzbekistan) Vlada Ekshibarova	6–2, 2–6, 3–6
Runner-up	10.	17 November 2007	ITF Pune, India	Hard	(Indonesia) Sandy Gumulya	3–6, 5–7
Runner-up	11.	4 May 2008	ITF Balikpapan, Indonesia	Hard	(Thailand) Noppawan Lertcheewakarn	3–6, 2–6
Winner	12.	10 May 2008	ITF Trivandrum, India	Clay	(Japan) Miki Miyamura	6–7^{(2)}, 6–2, 6–4

=== Doubles: 13 (7–6) ===
Legend $25,000 tournaments $10,000 tournaments	Finals by surface Hard (7–6) Clay (0–0)

Outcome	No.	Date	Tournament	Surface	Partner	Opponents	Score
Runner-up	1.	14 May 2000	ITF Indore, India	Hard	(India) Meghha Vakaria	(India) Archana Venkataraman (India) Arthi Venkataraman	3–6, 6–1, 2–6
Winner	1.	21 May 2000	ITF New Delhi, India	Hard	(India) Meghha Vakaria	(India) Sheethal Goutham (India) Liza Pereira Viplav	7–5, 6–2
Runner-up	2.	26 May 2003	ITF New Delhi, India	Hard	(India) Liza Pereira Viplav	(India) Sheethal Goutham (India) Shruti Dhawan	5–7, 2–6
Winner	2.	17 January 2004	ITF Hyderabad, India	Hard	(India) Meghha Vakaria	(India) Rushmi Chakravarthi (India) Sai Jayalakshmy Jayaram	7–5, 5–7, 6–3
Runner-up	3.	21 May 2005	ITF Indore, India	Hard	(India) Meghha Vakaria	(India) Ankita Bhambri (India) Sanaa Bhambri	7–5, 3–6, 2–6
Runner-up	4.	12 June 2006	ITF New Delhi, India	Hard	(Thailand) Pichittra Thongdach	(India) Rushmi Chakravarthi (India) Meghha Vakaria	3–6, 4–6
Winner	3.	10 November 2006	ITF Pune, India	Hard	(Kyrgyzstan) Ksenia Palkina	(India) Madura Ranganathan (Thailand) Nungnadda Wannasuk	6–3, 4–6, 6–4
Winner	4.	25 May 2007	ITF Mumbai, India	Hard	(Mauritius) Marinne Giraud	(India) Ankita Bhambri (India) Sanaa Bhambri	6–4, 6–1
Winner	5.	13 June 2008	ITF Gurgaon, India	Hard	(Russia) Elina Gasanova	(India) Ankita Bhambri (India) Sanaa Bhambri	6–3, 6–4
Runner-up	5.	24 October 2008	Lagos Open, Nigeria	Hard	(India) Rushmi Chakravarthi	(Russia) Elena Chalova (Russia) Valeria Savinykh	7–6^{(6)}, 3–6, [7–10]
Winner	6.	22 May 2009	ITF Mumbai, India	Hard	(India) Rushmi Chakravarthi	(Australia) Renee Binnie (China) He Chunyan	2–6, 6–3, [10–7]
Winner	7.	11 September 2009	ITF Bangalore, India	Hard	(India) Poojashree Venkatesha	(Japan) Moe Kawatoko (India) Kumari-Sweta Solanki	6–4, 6–3
Runner-up	6.	9 December 2011	ITF Solapur, India	Hard	(India) Sri Peddi Reddy	(China) Lu Jiajing (China) Lu Jiaxiang	0–6, 5–7
