= Sai Jayalakshmy Jayaram =

Indian tennis player

- Country (sports): India
- Born: 16 February 1977 (age 49) Chennai, India
- Turned pro: 1996
- Retired: 2010
- Plays: Right-handed (two-handed backhand)
- Prize money: $56,843

Singles
- Career record: 156–135
- Career titles: 0 WTA, 7 ITF
- Highest ranking: No. 331 (25 December 2000)

Doubles
- Career record: 202–119
- Career titles: 0 WTA, 34 ITF
- Highest ranking: No. 249 (18 June 2001)

Team competitions
- Fed Cup: 6–7

Sai Jayalakshmy Jayaram (born 16 February 1977 in Chennai) is a former professional female tennis player.

In her career, she won seven singles and 34 doubles titles on the ITF Women's Circuit. On 25 December 2000, she reached her best singles ranking of world No. 331. On 18 June 2001, she peaked at No. 249 in the WTA doubles rankings.

Playing for India Fed Cup team, Jayalakshmy Jayaram has a win–loss record of 6–7.

She had a notable victory over Nina Bratchikova in 2005.

She made her WTA Tour main-draw debut at the 2003 Hyderabad Open, in the doubles event partnering Rushmi Chakravarthi. Sai Jayalakshmy Jayaram retired from professional tennis 2010.

== ITF Circuit finals ==
$100,000 tournaments
$75,000 tournaments
$50,000 tournaments
$25,000 tournaments
$10,000 tournaments

=== Singles: 15 (7–8) ===
Outcome	No.	Date	Location	Surface	Opponent	Score
Runner-up	1.	12 October 1998	Ahmedabad, India	Hard	(India) Rushmi Chakravarthi	6–7, 3–6
Winner	2.	19 October 1998	Ahmedabad, India	Hard	(Thailand) Monthika Anuchan	6–3, 3–6, 6–1
Winner	3.	26 October 1998	Ahmedabad, India	Hard	(India) Rushmi Chakravarthi	6–0, 6–2
Runner-up	4.	2 November 1998	Ahmedabad, India	Hard	(India) Shruti Dhawan	5–7, 3–6
Runner-up	5.	17 April 1999	Mumbai, India	Hard	(India) Radhika Tulpule	3–6, 2–6
Winner	6.	10 May 1999	Mumbai, India	Hard	(India) Archana Venkataraman	6–1, 7–5
Winner	7.	10 April 2000	Mumbai, India	Carpet	(India) Sonal Phadke	6–2, 6–3
Runner-up	8.	17 April 2000	New Delhi, India	Hard	(India) Nirupama Sanjeev	3–6, 2–6
Winner	9.	16 October 2000	Gwalior, India	Clay	(Netherlands) Andrea van den Hurk	4–1, 4–0
Runner-up	10.	1 April 2002	New Delhi, India	Hard	(India) Samrita Sekar	1–6, 6–3, 5–7
Winner	11.	8 April 2002	New Delhi, India	Hard	(India) Isha Lakhani	1–6, 6–3, 6–1
Winner	12.	7 July 2002	Tlemcen, Algeria	Clay	(Austria) Elisabeth Bahn	7–5, 0–6, 6–4
Runner-up	13.	10 September 2002	Mysore, India	Hard	(India) Rushmi Chakravarthi	2–6, 1–6
Runner-up	14.	25 October 2003	Lagos, Nigeria	Hard	(Egypt) Heidi El Tabakh	4–6, 4–6
Runner-up	15.	30 August 2004	New Delhi, India	Hard	(India) Rushmi Chakravarthi	3–6, 2–6

=== Doubles: 49 (34–15) ===
Outcome	No.	Date	Location	Surface	Partner	Opponents	Score
Winner	1.	12 October 1998	Ahmedabad, India	Hard	(India) Rushmi Chakravarthi	(Thailand) Monthika Anuchan (Thailand) Orawan Wongkamalasai	1–6, 6–4, 6–3
Winner	2.	19 October 1998	Ahmedabad, India	Hard	(India) Rushmi Chakravarthi	(India) Archana Venkataraman (India) Arthi Venkataraman	6–2, 6–4
Runner-up	3.	26 October 1998	Ahmedabad, India	Hard	(India) Rushmi Chakravarthi	(India) Shruti Dhawan (India) Sheethal Goutham	4–6, 4–6
Winner	4.	2 November 1998	Ahmedabad, India	Hard	(India) Rushmi Chakravarthi	(Thailand) Monthika Anuchan (Thailand) Orawan Wongkamalasai	7–6^{(4)}, 1–6, 6–2
Winner	5.	17 April 1999	Mumbai, India	Hard	(India) Sai Jayalakshmy Jayaram	(India) Shruti Dhawan (India) Sheethal Goutham	5–7, 6–0, 6–3
Winner	6.	24 April 1999	Mumbai, India	Hard	(India) Sai Jayalakshmy Jayaram	(India) Archana Venkataraman (India) Arthi Venkataraman	7–5, 3–6, 7–6
Winner	7.	30 April 1999	Mumbai, India	Hard	(India) Sai Jayalakshmy Jayaram	(India) Shruti Dhawan (India) Sheethal Goutham	7–5, 6–2
Runner-up	8.	10 May 1999	Mumbai, India	Carpet	(India) Sai Jayalakshmy Jayaram	(India) Shruti Dhawan (India) Sheethal Goutham	0–1 ret.
Runner-up	9.	18 October 1999	Jakarta, Indonesia	Hard	(India) Rushmi Chakravarthi	(Indonesia) Liza Andriyani (Thailand) Benjamas Sangaram	0–6, 3–6
Winner	10.	16 April 2000	Mumbai, India	Hard	(India) Rushmi Chakravarthi	(India) Manisha Malhotra (Japan) Satomi Kinjo	6–4, 4–6, 2–1 ret.
Winner	11.	17 April 2000	New Delhi, India	Carpet	(India) Nirupama Sanjeev	(India) Rushmi Chakravarthi (India) Radhika Tulpule	6–4, 6–2
Runner-up	12.	3 September 2000	Jaipur, India	Grass	(India) Rushmi Chakravarthi	(Australia) Monique Adamczak (Austria) Jennifer Schmidt	3–6, 6–1, 5–7
Winner	13.	10 September 2000	New Delhi, India	Hard	(India) Rushmi Chakravarthi	(Thailand) Orawan Wongkamalasai (Chinese Taipei) Wang I-ting	6–3, 6–2
DNP	–	17 September 2000	Bangalore, India	Clay	(India) Sai Jayalakshmy Jayaram	(India) Jyotsna Vasisht (India) Karishma Patel	—N/a
Runner-up	14.	16 October 2000	Gwalior, India	Clay	(India) Rushmi Chakravarthi	(Paraguay) Monica Acosta (Paraguay) Larissa Schaerer	2–4, 1–4, 4–0, 3–5
Winner	15.	23 October 2000	New Delhi, India	Grass	(India) Rushmi Chakravarthi	(Slovenia) Urška Vesenjak (Slovenia) Maša Vesenjak	4–2, 4–5^{(5)}, 4–1, 4–0
Winner	16.	30 October 2000	New Delhi, India	Hard	(India) Rushmi Chakravarthi	(Slovenia) Urška Vesenjak (Slovenia) Maša Vesenjak	5–3, 4–2, 5–3
Runner-up	17.	6 November 2000	Bandung, Indonesia	Hard	(India) Rushmi Chakravarthi	(Indonesia) Liza Andriyani (Indonesia) Angelique Widjaja	1–4, 2–4, 0–4
Winner	18.	20 November 2000	Manila, Philippines	Hard	(India) Rushmi Chakravarthi	(Japan) Miho Saeki (Japan) Remi Uda	5–3, 4–1, 4–2
Winner	19.	11 March 2001	New Delhi, India	Hard	(India) Sai Jayalakshmy Jayaram	(India) Archana Venkataraman (India) Arthi Venkataraman	6–1, 6–2
Winner	20.	16 April 2001	Chandigarh, India	Hard	(India) Rushmi Chakravarthi	(Indonesia) Dea Sumantri (India) Radhika Tulpule	6–1, 7–5
Winner	21.	23 April 2001	Pune, India	Hard	(India) Rushmi Chakravarthi	(India) Sania Mirza (India) Sonal Phadke	6–2, 6–0
Winner	22.	3 September 2001	Chennai, India	Clay	(India) Rushmi Chakravarthi	(India) Samrita Sekar (India) Shubha Srinivasen	6–0, 7–6^{(2)}
Winner	23.	19 September 2001	New Delhi, India	Hard	(India) Rushmi Chakravarthi	(India) Shruti Dhawan (India) Radhika Tulpule	6–7^{(5)}, 6–4, 6–4
Winner	24.	1 April 2002	New Delhi, India	Hard	(India) Radhika Tulpule	(India) Samrita Sekar (India) Archana Venkataraman	6–7^{(8)}, 6–4, 6–1
Winner	25.	8 April 2002	New Delhi, India	Hard	(India) Radhika Tulpule	(India) Samrita Sekar (India) Archana Venkataraman	7–5, 6–0
Winner	26.	15 April 2002	New Delhi, India	Hard	(India) Radhika Tulpule	(India) Samrita Sekar (India) Archana Venkataraman	6–2, 6–2
Winner	27.	22 April 2002	New Delhi, India	Clay	(India) Radhika Tulpule	(India) Samrita Sekar (India) Archana Venkataraman	5–7, 6–1, 6–4
Winner	28.	10 June 2002	Ankara, Turkey	Clay	(Belarus) Elena Yaryshka	(Germany) Jacqueline Froehlich (Romania) Ruxandra Marin	6–2, 6–2
Runner-up	29.	7 July 2002	Tlemcen, Algeria	Clay	(India) Rushmi Chakravarthi	(Austria) Susanne Aigner (Austria) Elisabeth Bahn	6–7^{(4)}, 6–4, 6–7^{(4)}
Winner	30.	10 September 2002	Mysore, India	Hard	(India) Rushmi Chakravarthi	(Russia) Alena Dvornikova (Russia) Anastasia Dvornikova	6–3, 6–3
Runner-up	31.	27 October 2002	Cairo, Egypt	Clay	(India) Rushmi Chakravarthi	(Hungary) Kira Nagy (Sweden) Maria Wolfbrandt	2–6, 1–6
Runner-up	32.	9 February 2003	Chennai, India	Clay	(India) Rushmi Chakravarthi	(Uzbekistan) Akgul Amanmuradova (Uzbekistan) Ivanna Israilova	4–6, 1–6
Winner	33.	23 February 2003	Bangalore, India	Hard	(India) Rushmi Chakravarthi	(Japan) Maki Arai (Belarus) Natallia Dziamidzenka	7–6^{(5)}, 7–6^{(4)}
Runner-up	34.	31 March 2003	Mumbai, India	Hard	(India) Rushmi Chakravarthi	(Uzbekistan) Akgul Amanmuradova (Malaysia) Khoo Chin-bee	2–6, 2–6
Winner	35.	20 April 2003	Muzaffarnagar, India	Grass	(India) Rushmi Chakravarthi	(India) Shruti Dhawan (Israel) Yael Glitzenshtein	6–1, 6–4
Winner	36.	17 August 2003	Colombo, Sri Lanka	Clay	(India) Rushmi Chakravarthi	(Chinese Taipei) Hwang I-hsuan (Thailand) Varanya Vijuksanaboon	6–0, 6–0
Winner	37.	8 September 2003	Bangalore, India	Grass	(India) Rushmi Chakravarthi	(Malaysia) Khoo Chin-bee (India) Meghha Vakaria	6–2, 6–4
Runner-up	38.	2 November 2003	Mumbai, India	Hard	(India) Rushmi Chakravarthi	(Czech Republic) Gabriela Chmelinová (Czech Republic) Hana Šromová	1–6, 1–6
Runner-up	39.	17 January 2004	Hyderabad, India	Hard	(India) Rushmi Chakravarthi	(India) Isha Lakhani (India) Meghha Vakaria	5–7, 7–5, 3–6
Runner-up	40.	23 May 2004	Lucknow, India	Grass	(India) Archana Venkataraman	(India) Ankita Bhambri (India) Rushmi Chakravarthi	4–6, 1–6
Winner	41.	5 July 2004	Sidi Fredj, Algeria	Clay	(New Zealand) Shelley Stephens	(United States) Jennifer Elie (Sweden) Michaela Johansson	6–3, 6–1
Winner	42.	21 August 2004	Colombo, Sri Lanka	Clay	(India) Rushmi Chakravarthi	(Chinese Taipei) Chan Yung-jan (Japan) Minori Takemoto	6–2, 5–7, 6–3
Winner	43.	4 September 2004	New Delhi, India	Hard	(India) Rushmi Chakravarthi	(Thailand) Montinee Tangphong (Thailand) Thassha Vitayaviroj	w/o
Winner	44.	24 October 2004	Pune, India	Hard	(Uzbekistan) Akgul Amanmuradova	(Thailand) Wilawan Choptang (Thailand) Thassha Vitayaviroj	6–3, 4–6, 6–3
Winner	45.	1 November 2004	Mumbai, India	Hard	(Uzbekistan) Akgul Amanmuradova	(Croatia) Maria Abramović (Czech Republic) Hana Šromová	4–6, 6–4, 6–4
Winner	46.	13 December 2004	Gurgaon, India	Clay	(India) Rushmi Chakravarthi	(India) Ankita Bhambri (India) Sanaa Bhambri	2–6, 6–2, 6–4
Runner-up	47.	11 April 2005	Mumbai, India	Hard	(India) Rushmi Chakravarthi	(Russia) Nina Bratchikova (Italy) Francesca Lubiani	3–6, 4–6
Winner	48.	9 May 2005	Ahmedabad, India	Hard	(India) Ankita Bhambri	(India) Sanaa Bhambri (India) Shruti Dhawan	6–2, 7–5
Runner-up	49.	6 November 2005	Pune, India	Hard	(India) Rushmi Chakravarthi	(Italy) Nicole Clerico (Kyrgyzstan) Ksenia Palkina	5–7, 6–7^{(7)}
