= Sandy Gumulya =

Indonesian tennis player (born 1986)

- Country (sports): Indonesia
- Residence: Jakarta
- Born: 2 April 1986 (age 39) Jakarta
- Height: 1.61 m (5 ft 3 in)
- Turned pro: 2000
- Plays: Right (two-handed backhand)
- Prize money: $82,205

Singles
- Career record: 182–91
- Career titles: 11 ITF
- Highest ranking: No. 228 (19 May 2008)

Grand Slam singles results
- Australian Open: Q1 (2008)

Doubles
- Career record: 77–74
- Career titles: 3 ITF
- Highest ranking: No. 274 (7 May 2007)

Team competitions
- Fed Cup: 7–13
Medal record
Southeast Asian Games
Gold medal – first place	2007 Nakhon Ratchasima	Singles
Silver medal – second place	2007 Nakhon Ratchasima	Doubles
Silver medal – second place	2007 Nakhon Ratchasima	Team
Silver medal – second place	2009 Vientiane	Team
Bronze medal – third place	2009 Vientiane	Doubles
Afro-Asian Games
Silver medal – second place	2003 Hyderabad	Team
Bronze medal – third place	2003 Hyderabad	Singles

Sandy Gumulya (born 2 April 1986) is an Indonesian former tennis player and the older sister of Beatrice Gumulya, also a professional tennis player.

== Career ==
Sandy made her debut as a professional in July 2000, aged 14, at an ITF tournament in Jakarta. In March 2009, she was the highest ranked Indonesian in the WTA rankings (singles).

In 2002 and 2003, she played in the Australian Open junior championships. In 2003, she and her partner Septi Mende reached the quarterfinals of the junior doubles competition at the Australian Open.

She was part of Indonesia Fed Cup team in 2003, 2004, 2008 and 2009.

Gumulya represented Indonesia at the 2006 Asian Games at Doha. She won her first-round match, and was then defeated by Li Na in the second round.

At the 2007 Southeast Asian Games, Gumulya won the gold medal in the women's single competitions, and also won the silver medal in the women's doubles competition with Romana Tedjakusuma as partner. Gumulya also enjoyed success at the 2009 Southeast Asian Games, winning bronze in the women's doubles and a silver in the women's team event.

In March 2009, Gumulya retired during the second set of the quarterfinal of the ASB Pro tournament at Hamilton, New Zealand, due to a knee injury. The injury forced her to withdraw from the third and final tournament of the ASB Pro Circuit, that at Wellington.

== ITF Circuit finals ==
Legend
$25,000 tournaments
$10,000 tournaments

=== Singles (11–6) ===
Result	No.	Date	Location	Surface	Opponent	Score
Win	1.	9 November 2003	Manila, Philippines	Clay	(Croatia) Maria Abramović	1–6, 6–4, 6–1
Win	2.	17 January 2004	Hyderabad, India	Hard	(India) Rushmi Chakravarthi	6–1, 6–3
Loss	3.	9 May 2004	Jakarta, Indonesia	Hard	(Indonesia) Liza Andriyani	3–6, 2–6
Loss	4.	26 September 2004	Jakarta, Indonesia	Hard	(Chinese Taipei) Chan Yung-jan	7–6^{(5)}, 2–6, 1–6
Win	5.	12 December 2004	Jakarta, Indonesia	Hard	(Indonesia) Ayu-Fani Damayanti	6–3, 6–0
Win	6.	25 March 2006	New Delhi, India	Hard	(South Korea) Kim Ji-young	6–3, 6–3
Win	7.	1 October 2006	Jakarta, Indonesia	Hard	(Hong Kong) Venise Chan	6–3, 6–0
Loss	8.	20 May 2007	Balikpapan, Indonesia	Hard	(Switzerland) Nicole Riner	6–4, 3–6, 5–7
Loss	9.	28 October 2007	Traralgon, Australia	Hard	(Australia) Jessica Moore	4–6, 4–6
Win	10.	17 November 2007	Pune, India	Hard	(India) Isha Lakhani	6–3, 7–5
Win	11.	3 August 2008	Surakarta, Indonesia	Hard	(South Korea) Kim Jin-hee	6–7^{(5)}, 6–1, 6–2
Loss	12.	10 August 2008	Jakarta, Indonesia	Hard	(Indonesia) Beatrice Gumulya	1–6, 6–3, 2–6
Win	13.	26 October 2008	Augusta, United States	Hard	(Ukraine) Tetiana Luzhanska	6–0, 7–6^{(5)}
Win	14.	3 October 2010	Jakarta, Indonesia	Hard	(New Zealand) Katherine Westbury	6–3, 6–0
Win	15.	10 October 2010	Jakarta, Indonesia	Hard	(China) Yang Zi	6–2, 6–2
Loss	16.	30 October 2010	Kuching, Malaysia	Hard	(Uzbekistan) Sabina Sharipova	4–6, 3–6
Win	17.	5 June 2011	Surabaya, Indonesia	Hard	(Indonesia) Jessy Rompies	6–1, 1–6, 6–1

=== Doubles (3–8) ===
Result	No.	Date	Location	Surface	Partner	Opponents	Score
Loss	1.	4 May 2003	Jakarta, Indonesia	Clay	(Indonesia) Septi Mende	(Chinese Taipei) Chuang Chia-jung (Chinese Taipei) Hwang I-hsuan	4–6, 3–6
Loss	2.	12 October 2003	Jakarta, Indonesia	Hard	(Indonesia) Wukirasih Sawondari	(Indonesia) Liza Andriyani (Indonesia) Diana Julianto	3–6, 3–6
Loss	3.	3 October 2004	Balikpapan, Indonesia	Hard	(Thailand) Pichittra Thongdach	(Indonesia) Ayu-Fani Damayanti (Indonesia) Septi Mende	2–6, 2–6
Loss	4.	25 March 2006	New Delhi, India	Hard	(Thailand) Pichittra Thongdach	(South Korea) Cho Jeong-a (South Korea) Kim Ji-young	6–2, 3–6, 3–6
Loss	5.	13 May 2006	Tarakan, Indonesia	Hard (i)	(Indonesia) Septi Mende	(China) Xia Huan (China) Xu Yifan	2–6, 7–6^{(3)}, 6–7^{(5)}
Loss	6.	30 September 2006	Jakarta, Indonesia	Hard	(Indonesia) Lavinia Tananta	(Switzerland) Stefania Boffa (Hong Kong) Zhang Ling	4–6, 4–6
Win	7.	3 May 2008	Balikpapan, Indonesia	Hard	(Indonesia) Lavinia Tananta	(Japan) Ayumi Oka (Japan) Tomoko Sugano	6–3, 4–6, [10–7]
Loss	8.	2 August 2008	Surakarta, Indonesia	Hard	(Indonesia) Lavinia Tananta	(Chinese Taipei) Chen Yi (South Korea) Kim Jin-hee	2–6, 4–6
Win	9.	9 October 2010	Jakarta, Indonesia	Hard	(Japan) Moe Kawatoko	(Chinese Taipei) Chan Hao-ching (China) He Sirui	7–6^{(3)}, 7–5
Win	10.	29 October 2010	Kuching, Malaysia	Hard	(Uzbekistan) Sabina Sharipova	(India) Rushmi Chakravarthi (France) Élodie Rogge-Dietrich	6–3, 6–2
Loss	11.	4 June 2011	Surabaya, Indonesia	Hard	(Indonesia) Cynthia Melita	(Indonesia) Jessy Rompies (Indonesia) Grace Sari Ysidora	3–6, 4–6
