= List of sports clubs in Colombo =

List of Sports Clubs in Colombo. Colombo has many Sports Clubs, covering different sports.

== Multi sports ==
- Bloomfield Cricket and Athletic Club
- Burgher Recreation Club
- Ceylonese Rugby & Football Club
- Colombo Gymkhana Club
- Colts Cricket Club
- Moors Sports Club
- Sinhalese Sports Club
- Sri Lanka Army Sports Club
- Tamil Union Cricket and Athletic Club

== Limited sports ==
- Colombo Athletic Football Club
- Royal Colombo Golf Club
- Colombo Rowing Club
- Colombo FC
- Colombo Swimming Club
- Ceylon Motor Yacht Club
- Colombo Lions, an American football team
- Nondescripts Cricket Club
