= Wickramaratne =

Wickramaratne (Sinhala: වික්‍රමරත්න, romanized: Vikramaratna) is a Sinhalese surname. Notable people with the surname include:

- C. D. Wickramaratne (1963–2026), Sri Lankan police officer, 35th Inspector General of Police
- Chulantha Wickramaratne, Sri Lankan chartered accountant, 41st auditor general (2019–2025)
- Eran Wickramaratne, Sri Lankan politician
- Hemantha Wickramaratne (born 1971), Sri Lankan cricketer
- Jagath Wickramaratne (born 1968), Sri Lankan politician and 23rd Speaker of the Parliament
- Jayampathy Wickramaratne, Sri Lankan politician
- Kingsley Wickramaratne (died 2008), Sri Lankan politician
- Ravin Wickramaratne (born 1962), Sri Lankan former cricketer
