= 2007 Davis Cup Asia/Oceania Zone Group III =

International tennis competition

The Group III tournament was held July 18–22, in Sri Lanka Tennis Association, Colombo, Sri Lanka, on outdoor hard courts.

== Format ==
The eight teams were split into two groups and played in a round-robin format. The top two teams of each group advanced to the promotion pool, from which the two top teams were promoted to the Asia/Oceania Zone Group II in 2008. The bottom two teams of each group were placed in the relegation pool, from which the two bottom teams were demoted to the Asia/Oceania Zone Group IV in 2008.

== Pool A ==
| | Pool A | LIB | UAE | SIN | KSA |
| 1 | Lebanon (3–0) | | 3–0 | 3–0 | 2–1 |
| 2 | United Arab Emirates (2–1) | 0–3 | | 2–1 | 2–1 |
| 3 | Singapore (1–2) | 0–3 | 1–2 | | 2–1 |
| 4 | Saudi Arabia (0–3) | 1–2 | 1–2 | 1–2 | |

=== Lebanon vs. Singapore ===
Lebanon
3
Sri Lanka Tennis Association, Colombo, Sri Lanka
18 July 2007
Hard

Singapore
0

| | | | 1 | 2 | 3 |
|---|---|---|---|---|---|
| 1 | (Lebanon) (Singapore) | Karim Alayli; Min-Sylvester Wee | 6; 2 | 6; 3 |
| 2 | (Lebanon) (Singapore) | Bassam Beidas; Chee-Jun Leong | 6; 0 | 6; 0 |
| 3 | (Lebanon) (Singapore) | Bassam Beidas / Patrick Chucri; Daniel Heryanta Dewandaka / Min-Sylvester Wee | 6; 1 | 6; 2 |

=== Saudi Arabia vs. United Arab Emirates ===
Saudi Arabia
1
Sri Lanka Tennis Association, Colombo, Sri Lanka
18 July 2007
Hard

United Arab Emirates
2

| | | | 1 | 2 | 3 |
|---|---|---|---|---|---|
| 1 | (Saudi Arabia) (United Arab Emirates) | Omar Althagib; Mahmoud Nader Al Blooshi | 6; 2 | 1; 6 | 6; 8 |
| 2 | (Saudi Arabia) (United Arab Emirates) | Fahad Al Saad; Omar Alawadhi | 7^{7} 6^{1} | 3; 6 | 4; 6 |
| 3 | (Saudi Arabia) (United Arab Emirates) | Saleh Alrajeh / Tamer Antabi; Hamad Abbas Janahi / Faisal Bastaki | 6; 2 | 6; 1 |

=== Lebanon vs. United Arab Emirates ===
Lebanon
3
Sri Lanka Tennis Association, Colombo, Sri Lanka
19 July 2007
Hard

United Arab Emirates
0

| | | | 1 | 2 | 3 |
|---|---|---|---|---|---|
| 1 | (Lebanon) (United Arab Emirates) | Karim Alayli; Mahmoud Nader Al Blooshi | 6; 2 | 6; 2 |
| 2 | (Lebanon) (United Arab Emirates) | Bassam Beidas; Omar Alawadhi | 7; 5 | 6; 2 |
| 3 | (Lebanon) (United Arab Emirates) | Bassam Beidas / Patrick Chucri; Hamad Abbas Janahi / Faisal Bastaki | 6; 1 | 6; 1 |

=== Saudi Arabia vs. Singapore ===
Saudi Arabia
1
Sri Lanka Tennis Association, Colombo, Sri Lanka
19 July 2007
Hard

Singapore
2

| | | | 1 | 2 | 3 |
|---|---|---|---|---|---|
| 1 | (Saudi Arabia) (Singapore) | Fahad Al Saad; Min-Sylvester Wee | 7; 5 | 6; 4 |
| 2 | (Saudi Arabia) (Singapore) | Saleh Alrajeh; Chee-Jun Leong | 6; 1 | 2; 6 | 4; 6 |
| 3 | (Saudi Arabia) (Singapore) | Saleh Alrajeh / Fahad Al Saad; Daniel Heryanta Dewandaka / Min-Sylvester Wee | 6^{3} 7^{7} | 5; 7 |

=== Lebanon vs. Saudi Arabia ===
Lebanon
2
Sri Lanka Tennis Association, Colombo, Sri Lanka
20 July 2007
Hard

Saudi Arabia
1

| | | | 1 | 2 | 3 |
|---|---|---|---|---|---|
| 1 | (Lebanon) (Saudi Arabia) | Karim Alayli; Fahad Al Saad | 6; 3 | 4; 6 | 5; 7 |
| 2 | (Lebanon) (Saudi Arabia) | Bassam Beidas; Tamer Antabi | 7; 5 | 6; 1 |
| 3 | (Lebanon) (Saudi Arabia) | Bassam Beidas / Patrick Chucri; Omar Althagib / Tamer Antabi | 6; 1 | 7^{7} 6^{3} |

=== Singapore vs. United Arab Emirates ===
Singapore
1
Sri Lanka Tennis Association, Colombo, Sri Lanka
20 July 2007
Hard

United Arab Emirates
2

| | | | 1 | 2 | 3 |
|---|---|---|---|---|---|
| 1 | (Singapore) (United Arab Emirates) | Min-Sylvester Wee; Mahmoud Nader Al Blooshi | 7^{7} 6^{2} | 6; 3 |
| 2 | (Singapore) (United Arab Emirates) | Chee-Jun Leong; Omar Alawadhi | 4; 6 | 1; 6 |
| 3 | (Singapore) (United Arab Emirates) | Daniel Heryanta Dewandaka / Min-Sylvester Wee; Mahmoud Nader Al Blooshi / Omar Alawadhi | 3; 6 | 5; 7 |

== Pool B ==
| | Pool B | OMA | SRI | VIE | MAS |
| 1 | Oman (3–0) | | 2–1 | 2–1 | 2–1 |
| 2 | Sri Lanka (2–1) | 1–2 | | 2–1 | 2–1 |
| 3 | Vietnam (1–2) | 1–2 | 1–2 | | 2–1 |
| 4 | Malaysia (0–3) | 1–2 | 1–2 | 1–2 | |

=== Vietnam vs. Malaysia ===
Vietnam
2
Sri Lanka Tennis Association, Colombo, Sri Lanka
18 July 2007
Hard

Malaysia
1

| | | | 1 | 2 | 3 |
|---|---|---|---|---|---|
| 1 | (Vietnam) (Malaysia) | Đỗ Minh Quân; Tan Qi Hao | 6; 1 | 6; 4 |
| 2 | (Vietnam) (Malaysia) | Ngô Quang Huy; Si Yew Ming | 2; 6 | 6; 3 | 2; 6 |
| 3 | (Vietnam) (Malaysia) | Đỗ Minh Quân / Lê Quốc Khánh; Si Yew Ming / Selvam Veerasingam | 6; 3 | 6; 4 |

=== Sri Lanka vs. Oman ===
Sri Lanka
1
Sri Lanka Tennis Association, Colombo, Sri Lanka
18 July 2007
Hard

Oman
2

| | | | 1 | 2 | 3 |
|---|---|---|---|---|---|
| 1 | (Sri Lanka) (Oman) | Renouk Wijemanne; Mohammed Al Nabhani | 2; 6 | 3; 6 |
| 2 | (Sri Lanka) (Oman) | Harshana Godamanna; Khalid Al Nabhani | 6; 2 | 6; 3 |
| 3 | (Sri Lanka) (Oman) | Harshana Godamanna / Rajeev Rajapakse; Khalid Al Nabhani / Mohammed Al Nabhani | 3; 6 | 4; 6 |

=== Vietnam vs. Oman ===
Vietnam
1
Sri Lanka Tennis Association, Colombo, Sri Lanka
19 July 2007
Hard

Oman
2

| | | | 1 | 2 | 3 |
|---|---|---|---|---|---|
| 1 | (Vietnam) (Oman) | Đỗ Minh Quân; Mohammed Al Nabhani | 1; 6 | 6; 2 | 6; 4 |
| 2 | (Vietnam) (Oman) | Ngô Quang Huy; Khalid Al Nabhani | 6; 3 | 5; 7 | 3; 6 |
| 3 | (Vietnam) (Oman) | Đỗ Minh Quân / Lê Quốc Khánh; Khalid Al Nabhani / Mohammed Al Nabhani | 6; 2 | 5; 7 | 3; 6 |

=== Sri Lanka vs. Malaysia ===
Sri Lanka
2
Sri Lanka Tennis Association, Colombo, Sri Lanka
19 July 2007
Hard

Malaysia
1

| | | | 1 | 2 | 3 |
|---|---|---|---|---|---|
| 1 | (Sri Lanka) (Malaysia) | Renouk Wijemanne; Selvam Veerasingam | 2; 6 | 6^{4} 7^{7} |
| 2 | (Sri Lanka) (Malaysia) | Harshana Godamanna; Si Yew Ming | 6; 2 | 6; 4 |
| 3 | (Sri Lanka) (Malaysia) | Harshana Godamanna / Rajeev Rajapakse; Si Yew Ming / Selvam Veerasingam | 6^{4} 7^{7} | 7^{7} 6^{5} | 6; 2 |

=== Vietnam vs. Sri Lanka ===
Vietnam
1
Sri Lanka Tennis Association, Colombo, Sri Lanka
20 July 2007
Hard

Sri Lanka
2

| | | | 1 | 2 | 3 |
|---|---|---|---|---|---|
| 1 | (Vietnam) (Sri Lanka) | Đỗ Minh Quân; Renouk Wijemanne | 6; 1 | 3; 6 | 6; 2 |
| 2 | (Vietnam) (Sri Lanka) | Ngô Quang Huy; Harshana Godamanna | 5; 7 | 5; 7 |
| 3 | (Vietnam) (Sri Lanka) | Đỗ Minh Quân / Lê Quốc Khánh; Harshana Godamanna / Rajeev Rajapakse | 3; 6 | 4; 6 |

=== Malaysia vs. Oman ===
Malaysia
1
Sri Lanka Tennis Association, Colombo, Sri Lanka
20 July 2007
Hard

Oman
2

| | | | 1 | 2 | 3 |
|---|---|---|---|---|---|---|
| 1 | (Malaysia) (Oman) | Tan Qi Hao; Mohammed Al Nabhani | 0; 6 | 0; 6 |
| 2 | (Malaysia) (Oman) | Abd-Hazli Bin Zainuddin; Khalid Al Nabhani | 1; 6 | 6^{2} 7^{7} |
| 3 | (Malaysia) (Oman) | Abd-Hazli Bin Zainuddin / Tan Qi Hao; Mohammed Al Nabhani / Sulaiman Al Rawahi | 4; 6 | 7; 5 | | retired |

== Promotion pool ==
The top two teams from each of Pools A and B advanced to the Promotion pool. Results and points from games against the opponent from the preliminary round were carried forward.

(scores in italics carried over from Groups)

| | 1st–4th Play-off | OMA | LIB | SRI | UAE |
| 1 | Oman (2–1, 6r) | | 1–2 | 2–1 | 3–0 |
| 2 | Lebanon (2–1, 6r) | 2–1 | | 1–2 | 3–0 |
| 3 | Sri Lanka (2–1, 5r) | 1–2 | 2–1 | | 2–1 |
| 4 | United Arab Emirates (0–3) | 0–3 | 0–3 | 1–2 | |

Note: Oman/Lebanon/Sri Lanka tie broken on number of rubbers won.

Oman and Lebanon promoted to Group II in 2008.

=== Lebanon vs. Oman ===
Lebanon
2
Sri Lanka Tennis Association, Colombo, Sri Lanka
21 July 2007
Hard

Oman
1

| | | | 1 | 2 | 3 |
|---|---|---|---|---|---|
| 1 | (Lebanon) (Oman) | Karim Alayli; Mohammed Al Nabhani | 6; 2 | 6; 2 |
| 2 | (Lebanon) (Oman) | Bassam Beidas; Khalid Al Nabhani | 6; 4 | 6; 4 |
| 3 | (Lebanon) (Oman) | Bassam Beidas / Patrick Chucri; Khalid Al Nabhani / Mohammed Al Nabhani | 3; 6 | 4; 6 |

=== United Arab Emirates vs. Sri Lanka ===
United Arab Emirates
1
Sri Lanka Tennis Association, Colombo, Sri Lanka
21 July 2007
Hard

Sri Lanka
2

| | | | 1 | 2 | 3 |
|---|---|---|---|---|---|
| 1 | (United Arab Emirates) (Sri Lanka) | Hamad Abbas Janahi; Renouk Wijemanne | 6; 2 | 6; 1 |
| 2 | (United Arab Emirates) (Sri Lanka) | Omar Alawadhi; Harshana Godamanna | 2; 6 | 0; 6 |
| 3 | (United Arab Emirates) (Sri Lanka) | Mahmoud Nader Al Blooshi / Omar Alawadhi; Harshana Godamanna / Rajeev Rajapakse | 3; 6 | 1; 6 |

=== Lebanon vs. Sri Lanka ===
Lebanon
1
Sri Lanka Tennis Association, Colombo, Sri Lanka
22 July 2007
Hard

Sri Lanka
2

| | | | 1 | 2 | 3 |
|---|---|---|---|---|---|
| 1 | (Lebanon) (Sri Lanka) | Karim Alayli; Rajeev Rajapakse | 7; 5 | 3; 6 | 6; 1 |
| 2 | (Lebanon) (Sri Lanka) | Rami Osman; Harshana Godamanna | 0; 6 | 0; 6 |
| 3 | (Lebanon) (Sri Lanka) | Bassam Beidas / Patrick Chucri; Harshana Godamanna / Rajeev Rajapakse | 2; 6 | 3; 6 |

=== Oman vs. United Arab Emirates ===
Oman
3
Sri Lanka Tennis Association, Colombo, Sri Lanka
22 July 2007
Hard

United Arab Emirates
0

| | | | 1 | 2 | 3 |
|---|---|---|---|---|---|---|
| 1 | (Oman) (United Arab Emirates) | Mohammed Al Nabhani; Mahmoud Nader Al Blooshi | 6; 4 | 6; 1 |
| 2 | (Oman) (United Arab Emirates) | Khalid Al Nabhani; Omar Alawadhi | 6; 4 | 3; 6 | 3; 1 | retired |
| 3 | (Oman) (United Arab Emirates) | Khalid Al Nabhani / Mohammed Al Nabhani; Hamad Abbas Janahi / Faisal Bastaki | 6; 1 | 6; 2 |

== Relegation pool ==
The bottom two teams from Pools A and B were placed in the relegation group. Results and points from games against the opponent from the preliminary round were carried forward.

(scores in italics carried over from Groups)

| | 5th–8th Play-off | VIE | MAS | SIN | KSA |
| 1 | Vietnam (3–0) | | 2–1 | 2–1 | 2–1 |
| 2 | Malaysia (2–1) | 1–2 | | 3–0 | 2–1 |
| 3 | Singapore (1–2) | 1–2 | 0–3 | | 2–1 |
| 4 | Saudi Arabia (0–3) | 1–2 | 1–2 | 1–2 | |

Singapore and Saudi Arabia relegated to Group IV in 2008.

=== Singapore vs. Vietnam ===
Singapore
1
Sri Lanka Tennis Association, Colombo, Sri Lanka
21 July 2007
Hard

Vietnam
2

| | | | 1 | 2 | 3 |
|---|---|---|---|---|---|
| 1 | (Singapore) (Vietnam) | Abdul Hakim Bin Jamaludin; Lê Quốc Khánh | 0; 6 | 6^{6} 7^{8} |
| 2 | (Singapore) (Vietnam) | Chee-Jun Leong; Ngô Quang Huy | 3; 6 | 1; 6 |
| 3 | (Singapore) (Vietnam) | Daniel Heryanta Dewandaka / Abdul Hakim Bin Jamaludin; Lê Quốc Khánh / Trần Thanh Hoàng | 7; 5 | 6; 1 |

=== Saudi Arabia vs. Malaysia ===
Saudi Arabia
1
Sri Lanka Tennis Association, Colombo, Sri Lanka
21 July 2007
Hard

Malaysia
2

| | | | 1 | 2 | 3 |
|---|---|---|---|---|---|
| 1 | (Saudi Arabia) (Malaysia) | Fahad Al Saad; Selvam Veerasingam | 6^{5} 7^{7} | 6; 3 | 6; 1 |
| 2 | (Saudi Arabia) (Malaysia) | Tamer Antabi; Si Yew Ming | 3; 6 | 7; 5 | 3; 6 |
| 3 | (Saudi Arabia) (Malaysia) | Saleh Alrajeh / Fahad Al Saad; Si Yew Ming / Selvam Veerasingam | 3; 6 | 3; 6 |

=== Singapore vs. Malaysia ===
Singapore
0
Sri Lanka Tennis Association, Colombo, Sri Lanka
22 July 2007
Hard

Malaysia
3

| | | | 1 | 2 | 3 |
|---|---|---|---|---|---|
| 1 | (Singapore) (Malaysia) | Abdul Hakim Bin Jamaludin; Selvam Veerasingam | 4; 6 | 3; 6 |
| 2 | (Singapore) (Malaysia) | Min-Sylvester Wee; Si Yew Ming | 3; 6 | 1; 6 |
| 3 | (Singapore) (Malaysia) | Abdul Hakim Bin Jamaludin / Chee-Jun Leong; Abd-Hazli Bin Zainuddin / Tan Qi Hao | 6^{9} 7^{11} | 0; 6 |

=== Vietnam vs. Saudi Arabia ===
Vietnam
2
Sri Lanka Tennis Association, Colombo, Sri Lanka
22 July 2007
Hard

Saudi Arabia
1

| | | | 1 | 2 | 3 |
|---|---|---|---|---|---|---|
| 1 | (Vietnam) (Saudi Arabia) | Trần Thanh Hoàng; Omar Althagib | 2; 6 | 6; 2 | 6; 1 |
| 2 | (Vietnam) (Saudi Arabia) | Ngô Quang Huy; Tamer Antabi | 6; 1 | 2; 6 | 8; 6 |
| 3 | (Vietnam) (Saudi Arabia) | Ngô Quang Huy / Trần Thanh Hoàng; Saleh Alrajeh / Fahad Al Saad | 0; 1 | | | retired |
