= List of gentlemen's clubs in Sri Lanka =

This is a list of gentlemen's clubs in Sri Lanka, including those no longer functioning and from the further regions of British ruled Sri Lanka and those formed after British ruled.

== Gentlemen's Clubs ==
Name	Date established	City	Province
Colombo Gymkhana Club	1832	Colombo	Western
Colombo Cricket Club	1863	Colombo	Western
Colombo Rowing Club	1864	Colombo	Western
Colombo Club	1871	Colombo	Western
Hill Club	1876	Nuwara Eliya	Central
Kandy Garden Club	1878	Kandy	Central
Royal Colombo Golf Club	1880	Colombo	Western
Kelani Valley Club	1884	Avissawella	Western
Nuwara Eliya Golf Club	1889	Nuwara Eliya	Central
Orient Club	1894	Colombo	Western
Burgher Recreation Club	1896	Colombo	Western
Queen's Club (Colombo)	1899	Colombo	Western
Sinhalese Sports Club	1899	Colombo	Western
Ceylonese Rugby & Football Club	1922	Colombo	Western
Colombo Swimming Club	1938	Colombo	Western

== See also ==
- Gymkhana
- List of American gentlemen's clubs
- List of London's gentlemen's clubs
