= Hill Club =

Gentlemen's club in Nuwara Eliya, Sri Lanka

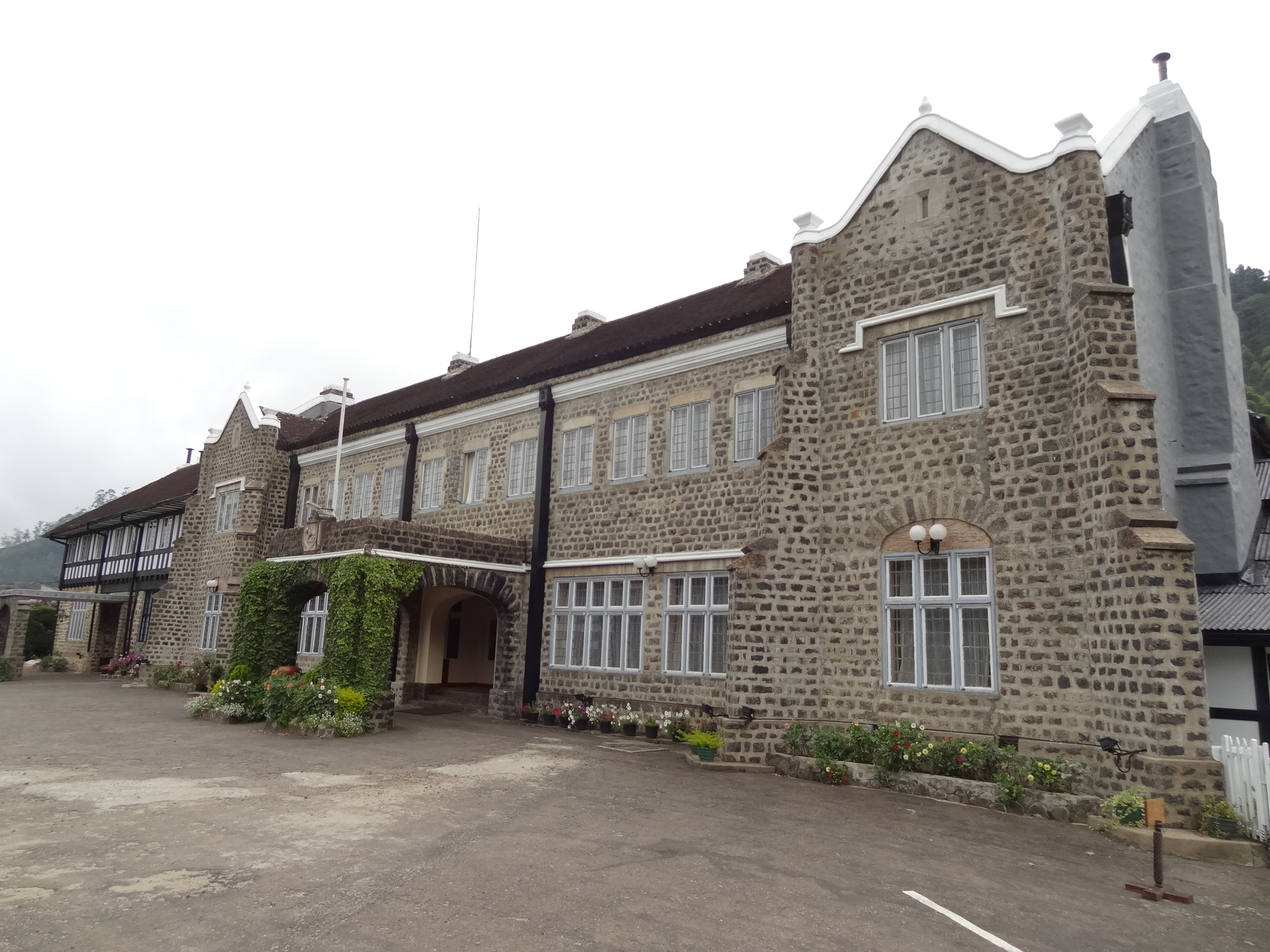
- The Hill Club, Nuwara Eliya
- Interactive map of Hill Club
- Address: The Hill Club, 29 Grand Hotel Road, Nuwara Eliya, Sri Lanka
- Coordinates: 6°58′2″N 80°45′1″E
- Owner: Hill Club Co. Ltd.
- Event: Gentlemen's club

Construction
- Built: 1867

Website
- hillclubsrilanka.lk

The Hill Club was a gentlemen's club in Nuwara Eliya, Sri Lanka. Established 1876 by British coffee planters in the hill station of Nuwara Eliya.

== History ==
The Hill Club was founded in 1876 by W. H. Walker, J. Wickwar and H. Saunders and started with only a billiard room and a bar. The Hill Club was established by the early Coffee, Cinchona and Tea planters and it was natural that most of the members were foreign planters. The first president was Edward Rosling, elected in 1899. The current building dates from the 1930s, when it was built by the British, Colombo-based firm of Edwards, Reid and Begg. The Club did not allow membership to women or locals until 1967.

=== Tennis ===
The Hill Club was the first venue for the Ceylon Lawn Tennis Association (CLTA) (now known as the Sri Lanka Tennis Association (SLTA)), which was established in 1915 under President (Sir) Robert Chalmers, the then Governor of Ceylon. The CLTA purchasing the courts and clubrooms from the Hill Club in 1928. The venue continued to be used as the headquarters of the CLTA until 1954 when the Association shifted to its present location in Colombo. The site was subsequently sold back to the Hill Club in 1973. The clay courts at the Hill Club were also the venue for the majority of the Ceylon Championships between 1884 and 1971. During this time the Nationals were almost always held in April, to coincide with the holiday festive season in Nuwara Eliya, which featured horse racing, hill climbs, car and motorcycle races and flower exhibitions. The Hill Club now holds a ‘B’ Grade open ranking tournament sanctioned by the SLTA.

== Features ==
The Hill Club is situated on a 6.9 ha (17 acres) property, on Grand Hotel Road. The Hill Club is located adjoining the Nuwara Eliya Golf Club on one side and the country home of Sri Lanka’s President on the other. The English colonial architectural features of the two-storey grey stone building, include wooden staircases, high roofs, hardwood floors, fireplaces and antique furniture. It has 44 rooms including three suites, together with three family chalets. It also has a dining room, two bars, (the 'Casual Bar' and the 'Mixed Bar'), a reading room, ladies' lounge, a games room (the 'Monsoon' room), four International standard tennis courts. It currently has a membership of approximately 950, consisting of both foreign nationals and Sri Lankans.

== See also ==
- List of Sri Lankan gentlemen's clubs
