= Criminal Justice Commission =

Criminal Justice Commission may refer to

- Criminal Justice Commission (Queensland)
- Criminal Justice Commission (Sri Lanka)
