= Colombo Club building =

The Colombo Club Building, now known as the Grand Crystal Ballroom at the Taj Samudra Hotel, is one of the oldest buildings in Colombo. Dating back to the British colonial era it was built in the early 1860s as the grandstand for the Colpetty Race Course by Assembly Rooms Company Limited. In 1871 it was leased by the Colombo Club as its club house and underwent much refurbishments. The building boasted one of the finest ballrooms in the country.

Following independence of Ceylon the building became home to the Hotel Training School housed the Samudra hotel, which became the Taj Samudra Hotel after it was taken over by the Taj Hotels Resorts and Palaces. The building is currently serves as the ballroom for the hotel.
