= Queen's Club (Colombo) =

Sri Lankan gentleman's club

- Formation: 1899; 127 years ago
- Purpose: Traditional Gentlemen's Club
- Location(s): 31 Maitland Crescent, Colombo 7
- Coordinates: 6.908676°N 79.865711°E
- Website: gymkhanaclub.lk

The Queen's Club is one of the oldest private members' club and the oldest tennis and squash club in Sri Lanka. The club was established in 1899 by prominent British colonialist in the island. Its membership was limited to British and Europeans until Ceylon gained independence in 1948, thereafter membership was extended to Ceylonese. In 1958 the club came under the umbrella of the Gymkhana Club. The club has since moved out of its original club house at the intersection of Colombo-Batticaloa highway and Bauddhaloka Mawtha (Thummulla Junction), and is now part of the Colombo Gymkhana Club. The original club house building was occupied by the Criminal Justice Commission and later by the Sri Lanka Air Force.

== See also ==
- List of Sri Lankan gentlemen's clubs
