= Kandy Garden Club =

Sports club in Kandy, Sri Lanka

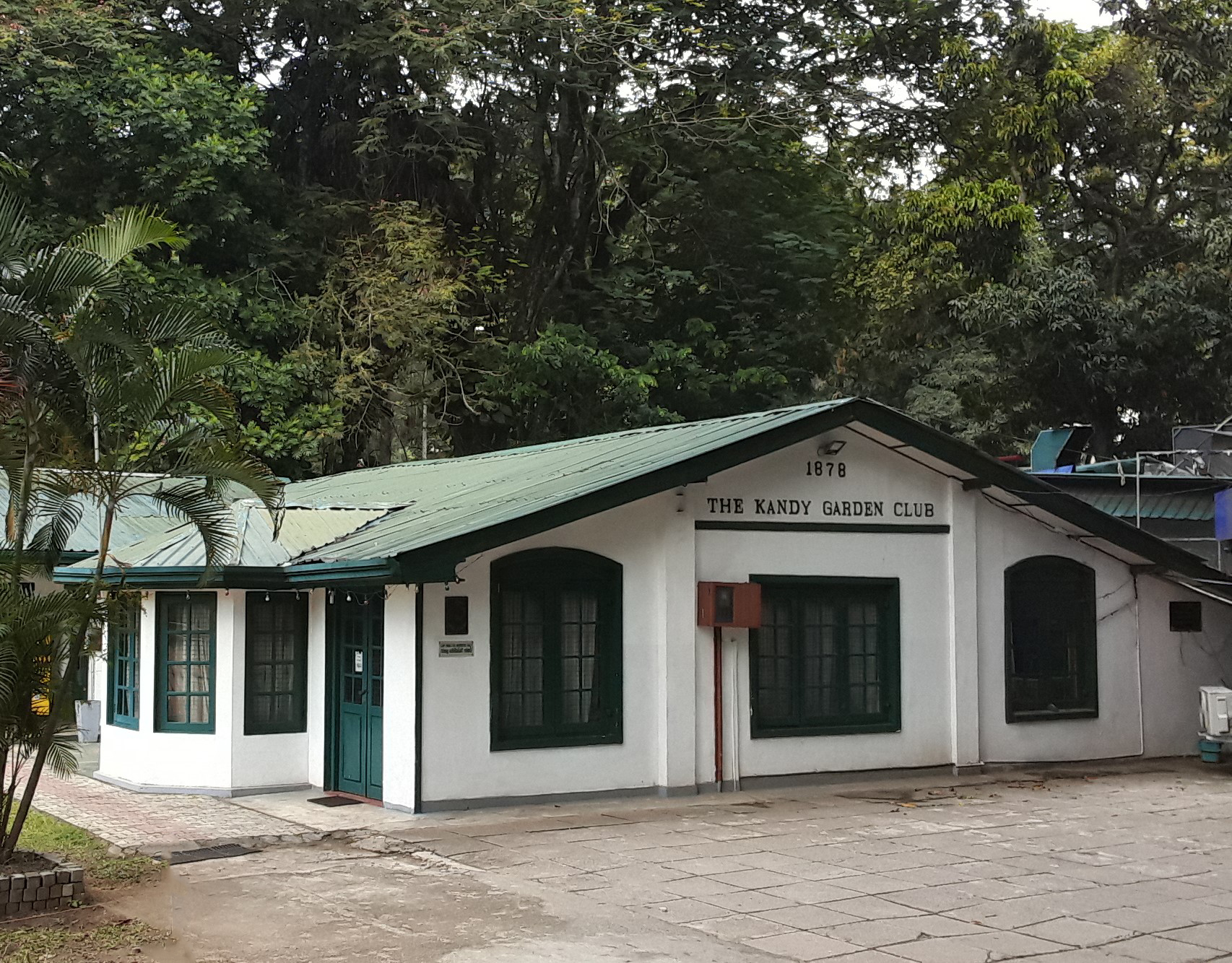

- Location within Sri Lanka
- Address: 9 Sangaraja Mawatha
- Location: Kandy, Sri Lanka
- Coordinates: 7°17′14″N 80°38′49″E
- Events: Sporting and Social Club
- Surface: Hardcourt
- Field shape: Rectangular

Construction
- Built: 1878
- Opened: 1878; 148 years ago

Website
- kandygardenclub.com

The Kandy Garden Club is a social and sports club in Kandy, Sri Lanka, which was established in 1878 for the exclusive use by British coffee planters to play tennis. It is one of the oldest operating sports clubs in the country and the second oldest in Kandy.

== History ==
The club was opened in 1878 for the exclusive use by the British, particularly planters wanting to play tennis. The nature of the club changed when an elite class of Sri Lankans (then Ceylonese) were permitted to join the club. In 1950 the club was opened to the Sri Lankans. The first Sri Lankan elected as president of the club was Col. S. D. Ratwatte with S. Wijenayake as the secretary.

== Features ==
The club is located at the south-eastern end of Kandy Lake, adjacent to the E. L. Senanayake Children's Park. It has four floodlit hardcourts. Other facilities include Billiards, Snooker, Table Tennis and Bridge. One of the club's billiard tables dates back to 1913, the table was manufactured by John W. Roberts and Company, and has been preserved in its original condition.

Billiards champions Paul Mifsudy, Norman Dangley, were among others invited to play exhibition matches at the Club table. In 1989 the second match of the first snooker test series between Sri Lanka and Pakistan was played at the club.

== See also ==
- List of Sri Lankan gentlemen's clubs
- Sri Lanka Tennis Association
