= Sri Lanka Tennis Association =

Sports governing body in Sri Lanka

- Sport: Tennis
- Abbreviation: (SLTA)
- Founded: 1915; 111 years ago
- Affiliation: International Tennis Federation
- Regional affiliation: Sri Lanka
- Location: Sri Lanka Tennis Association, Sir Marcus Fernando Road, Colombo
- President: Maxwell De Silva
- Secretary: Vipul Perera

Official website
- www.srilankatennis.org

Sri Lanka Tennis Association (SLTA) is a national governing body of tennis in Sri Lanka founded in 1915, which represents Sri Lanka on associations like the International Tennis Federation and the Asian Tennis Federation. Its main aim is to popularise tennis in all parts of Sri Lanka as a professional sport and to produce top tennis players from Sri Lanka.

== History ==
Tennis in Sri Lanka was introduced during the British Rule with the founding of the Ceylon Lawn Tennis Association in 1915. The CLTA was originally headquartered at the ‘Challet’ in Nuwara Eliya and was conducting the Nationals on clay courts located at where Hill Club now sits. CLTC held tournaments in Colombo too, especially at the Colombo Lawn Club. The Governor of Ceylon, Robert Chalmers, 1st Baron Chalmers, was the first president of the association. From establishment of the association until 1946, there was a practice at the CLTA to have the Governor of Ceylon, as administrative head of the British colony, as its President. The first Sri Lankan to become CLTA president was Dr. C. H. Gunasekara in 1947 until 1949. It takes pride as being the oldest national tennis association in Asia.

== List of Sri Lankan presidents ==
Included:

- Dr. C. H. Gunasekara, (1947-1949)
- T. E. de Silva, (1950-1954)
- Lionel Fonseka (1955-1957)
- V. A. Sugathadasa, (1958-1968)
- M. T. Thiruchittampalam, (1969-1975)
- K. T. E. de Silva ?
- Janaka Bogollagama ?
- D. L. Seneviratne, (1987-1990)
- D. L. Seneviratne, (1991-2000)
- Suresh Subramaniam, (2001-2006)
- Maxwell de Silva, (2009-2010)
- Iqbal Bil Isaack, (2012-current)

== List of governor presidents ==
Included:

- Sir Robert Chalmers (1915-16)
- Sir John Anderson (1916-19)
- Sir William Henry Manning (1919-27)
- Sir Herbert J. Stanley (1927-31)
- Sir Graeme Thomson (1931-33)
- Sir Reginald Edward Stubbs (1933-37)
- Sir Andrew Caldecott (1937-42)
- Sir Henry Monck-Mason Moore (1945-46)

== Tennis in Sri Lanka ==
While cricket remains the most popular sport in Sri Lanka, the Sri Lanka Tennis Association (SLTA) allocates resources toward increasing tennis participation, promoting the sport for public health, and developing internationally ranked players.

== Tournaments conducted by SLTA ==
=== Current ===
==== International ====
Include:

- Sri Lanka Men's Futures F1
- Sri Lanka Men's Futures F2
- Sri Lanka Men's Futures F3
- Davis Cup Asia/Oceania Group III
- ITF Junior Circuit Grade 5 Week 1 (U-18)
- ITF Junior Circuit Grade 5 Week 2 (U-18)
- ITF Junior Circuit Grade 5 Week 3 (U-18)
- Sri Lanka Women's Futures F1
- Sri Lanka Women's Futures F2
- Sri Lanka Women's Futures F3
- ATF Week 1 (U-14)
- ATF Week 2 (U-14)

==== National ====
Include:

- ACM Tennis School Tournament, Tamil Union Club, Colombo
- All-Island Inter-School Cool Championship, SLTA, Colombo
- Bandarawela Tennis Club Tournament, Bandarawela
- Batticaloa Tennis Centre Tournament, Batticaloa
- Colombo Championships, (1915-current)
- CR and FC Tournament, CF & FC Club, Longdon Place
- DTS Tournament, St. Thomas' College Club, Colombo
- Inter-Schools Cool Divisional Qualifying Tournament
- Jaffna Club Tournament, St. Patrick's College Tennis Club, Jaffna
- Kalutara Tennis Centre Tournament, Kalutara
- Kandy Garden Club Tournament, Kandy Garden Club, Kandy
- Kurunegala Club Tournament, Kurunegala Tennis Club, Kurenagala
- Moors Club Open Tournament, Moors Tennis Club, Colombo
- Negombo Club Tournament, Negombo Tennis Club, Negombo, (1975-current)
- Otters Club Tournament, Otters Tennis Club, Colombo, (1965-current)
- Queen's Club Open Tournament, Queen's Club, Colombo, (1969-current)
- SLTA Playing Section Tournament, SLTA, Colombo
- SLTA Nationals, SLTA, Colombo
- SSC Open Tournament, SSC Tennis Club, Colombo
- Thurstan College Tournament, Thurstan, Colombo
- Women's Club Tournament, Women's Club, Colombo
- Tamil Union Club Open Tournament, Tamil Union, Colombo, (1972-current)

=== Former ===
Overseen by the SLTA have included:

- Carlton Club Championships, Colombo, (1960–1964).
- Ceylon Championships, Nuwara Eliya, (1886-1976), later renamed Sri Lankan National Championships is still played today.
- Ceylon Wimbledon Championships (1887–1890), Nuwara Eliya.
- Colombo Otters Open (1964–1974).
- Colombo tournament, Colombo (1963–1971).
- Floodlight Open, (1963).
- Fort Tennis Club Open, Fort, Colombo, (1964–1967).
- Government Services Tennis Club Championships, Colombo, (1966-?)
- Negombo Championships, Negombo, (1963–1974).
- Sabaragamuwa Championships, Ratnapura, (1963–1969).
- Taldua Open, Colombo, (1965).
- Tamil Union Championships, Colombo, (1930–1969).
- Tamil Union Open Championships (1970-1973)
- UVA Championships, Badulla, (1967).
- Up-Country Nationals, Bandarawela, (1955–1971).

== List of approved SLTA tennis clubs ==
This is a list of major tennis clubs within Sri Lanka:

- Bandarawela tennis club
- Carlton Tennis club
- Cathedral Tennis club
- Chilow sports club
- Colombo Gymkhana Club
- Dehiwala /Mt.Lavinia Cosmopolitan Sports Club
- Dickoya / Maskeliya cricket club
- Galle Services Club
- Govt. servants lawn tennis club
- Govt. servants tennis club
- Govt. Surveyors sports club
- Hill Club
- Kalutara lawn tennis club
- Kandana club
- Kandy Garden Club
- K. C. Y. M. A. Tennis club
- Rathnapura Tennis School
- Matale District Tennis Club
