= Sri Lanka Cricket =

Governing body for cricket in Sri Lanka

- Sport: Cricket
- Jurisdiction: Sri Lanka
- Abbreviation: SLC
- Founded: 30 June 1975; 51 years ago
- Affiliation: International Cricket Council
- Affiliation date: 21 July 1981; 45 years ago
- Regional affiliation: Asian Cricket Council
- Affiliation date: 19 September 1983; 43 years ago
- Headquarters: Sinhalese Sports Club
- Location: 35 Maitland Place, Colombo 7
- Operating income: රු.4,309 million (2020)
- Sponsor: ITW Global; Sony Pictures Networks; Moose Clothing; Amul; Masuri; My Cola; Nawaloka Hospital; The IPG Group; Cycle Incense; life bottled water; Crystal Bottled Drinking Water
- Replaced: Board of Control for Cricket in Sri Lanka (BCCSL)

Official website
- srilankacricket.lk
- Other key staff: Ashley de Silva (CEO); Jerome Jayaratne (COO)
- (Sri Lanka)

Sri Lanka Cricket (SLC) is the governing body for cricket in Sri Lanka. It was First registered with the Sri Lankan Ministry of Sports as the Board of Control for Cricket in Sri Lanka on 30 June 1975 as a national sports body. The board was renamed in 2003.

The SLC operates all of the Sri Lankan national representative cricket sides, including the Men's, Women's, Under-19 and Under-17 sides. The SLC is also responsible for organising and hosting Test tours and one day internationals with other nations, and scheduling the home international fixtures.

== History ==
Cricket was brought to the nation when it was colonized by the British. As everywhere that the British arrived in numbers, cricket soon followed and it is reasonable to assume that the game was first played on the island by 1800. The earliest definite mention of cricket in Ceylon was a report in the Colombo Journal on 5 September 1832 which called for the formation of a cricket club. The Colombo Cricket Club was formed soon afterwards and matches began in November 1833 when it played against the 97th Regiment.

Throughout the 20th century, the game became increasingly popular in Sri Lanka. It was in the 1975 inaugural Cricket World Cup that they made their international debut. They lost to the West Indies by 9 wickets. They did however turn heads at the same tournament with an excellent display in their match against Australia. The national team won the ICC Trophy in 1979. On 21 July 1981, Sri Lanka was admitted to full membership of the ICC and was awarded Test Match status. The inaugural Test was played at Paikiasothy Saravanamuttu Stadium in Colombo in February 1982 against England that Sri Lanka lost by 8 wickets. Sri Lanka won the 1996 Cricket World Cup by defeating Australia. Sri Lanka won the 2014 ICC World Twenty20 by defeating India.

In 2023, SLC faced accusations of corruption and declining standards, with Minister for Sports Roshan Ranasinghe having considered its board to be "traitorous and corrupt". After being eliminated from the 2023 Cricket World Cup, Ranasinghe called for the resignation of the SLC board. On 6 November 2023, after the board's secretary Mohan De Silva resigned, Ranasinghe removed the entire SLC board and replaced them with a seven-member interim committee led by Arjuna Ranatunga—captain of Sri Lanka's 1996 World Cup-winning team. The next day, in response to a petition by the board's president Shammi Silva, the Appeal Court ruled that the previous board was to be reinstated for a period of two weeks pending hearings.

On 10 November 2023, the ICC suspended SLC for failing to meet "the requirement to manage its affairs autonomously and ensure that there is no government interference in the governance, regulation and/or administration". While the board of the ICC ruled that the suspension would not affect Sri Lanka's day-to-day participation in international cricket, the country was stripped of its rights to host the 2024 Under-19 Cricket World Cup. On 28 January 2024, the ICC lifted the suspension, after its board ruled that SLC were no longer in breach of membership obligations.

On 29 April 2026, Shammi Silva, president of Sri Lanka Cricket, along with all office-bearers and members of the executive committee, resigned from their posts with immediate effect. Eran Wickramaratne, a former Member of Parliament, was appointed chairman of a nine-member interim committee (Sri Lanka Cricket Transformation Committee) to manage Sri Lanka Cricket until fresh elections are conducted. The appointment was made by Sunil Kumara Gamage, Minister of Sports and Youth Affairs, to address current issues in the sport and implement structural reforms.

== Domestic competitions ==
Sri Lanka Cricket oversees the progress and handling of the major domestic competitions in the country:

- T10
1. Lanka T10
- T20
1. Lanka Premier League
2. Major Clubs T20 Tournament
3. SLC Invitational T20 League
- First Class
1. Major League Tournament
2. National Super League 4-Day Tournament
- List A
1. Major Clubs Limited Over Tournament
2. National Super League Limited Over Tournament

They also organize and host the Inter-Provincial Cricket Tournament, a competition focusing on provincial-level teams with pooled talent rather than on individual cricket clubs.

=== Former Competitions ===
- Premier Limited Overs Tournament
- SLC Invitational T20 League
- Sri Lanka Premier League(2012)
- SLC Twenty20 Tournament
- SLC T20 League(2018)
- Super T20 Provincial Tournament
- Sri Lanka Cricket Super 4's T20 (2013–2014)

== Leadership ==
=== Presidents ===
Name	Tenure
Ceylon Cricket Association (1914–1948)
Col. Dr. John R. Rockwood	1914–1933 (19 Years)
Edwin M. Karunaratne	1933–1934 (1 Year)
Chandrarajan Sivasaravanamuttu	1937–1948 (9 Years)
Board of Control for Cricket in Ceylon (1948–1972)
Paikiasothy Saravanamuttu	1948–1950 (2 Years)
A. E. Christoffelsz	1950–1952 (2 Years)
Junius Richard Jayewardene	1952–1955 (3 Years)
Lt. Col. Sabdharatnajyoti Saravanamuttu	1955–1956 (1 Year)
Robert Senanayake	1956–1972 (16 Years)
Board of Control for Cricket in Sri Lanka (1972–2000)
Sai Senanayakerajah	1972–1976 (8 Years)
Maj. Gen. Bertram Heyn	1976–1978 (2 Years)
Dr. N. M. Perera	1978–1979 (1 Year)
T. B. Werapitiya	1979–1981 (2 Years)
Gamini Dissanayake	1981–1989 (8 Years)
Lakshman Jayakody	1989–1990 (1 Year)
Manane Chandrarajah	1990–1991 (1 Year)
Tyronne Fernando	1991–1994 (3 Years)
Anandarajasingh Punchihewa	1995–1996 (1 Year)
Upali Dharmadasa	1996–1998 (2 Years)
Thilanga Sumathipala	1998–1999 (1 Year)
Rienzie Wijetilleke	1999–2000 (1 Year)
Thilanga Sumathipala	2000–2001 (1 Year)
Vijaya Malalasekera	2001–2002 (1 Year)
Hemaka Amarasuriya	2002–2003 (1 Year)
Sri Lanka Cricket (2003 – present)
Thilanga Sumathipala	2003–2004 (1 Year Term)
Mohan De Silva	2004–2005 (1 Year Term)
Jayantha Dharmadasa	2005–2007 (Interim Committee)
Arjuna Ranatunga	2008 (Interim Committee)
S. Liyanagama	2008–2009 (Interim Committee/Ministry Secretary)
Somachandra de Silva	2009–2011 (Interim Committee)
Upali Dharmadasa	2011–2012 (1 Year Term)
Jayantha Dharmadasa	2013–2015 (2 Years Term)
Sidath Wettimuny	2015 (Interim Committee)
Thilanga Sumathipala	2016–2018 (2 Years Term)
Kamal Padmasiri	2018 (1 June to 14 December) (7 Months)
W.A. Chulananda	15 December 2018 to 18 February 2019 (3 Months)
Shammi Silva	2019–2021 (2 Years Term)
Shammi Silva	2021–2023 (2 Years Term)
Shammi Silva	2023–2025 (2 Years Term)
Eran Wickremaratne	2026—present

=== Vice-Presidents ===
- Killi Rajamahendran (Early 1980s)
- Shelley Wickramasinghe (mid-1980s)
- Thilanga Sumathipala
- Aravinda de Silva (2003–2004)
- K. Mathivanan
- Asanga Seneviratne
- Jayantha Dharmadasa (2016 – present)
- K. Mathivanan (2016–2019)
- Ravin Wickramaratne (2019 – present)

=== Secretaries ===
- Kushil Gunasekara (2002)
- Mohan De Silva (2003)
- Lourence Amarasena (2004)
- S. Liyanagama
- Michael de Zoysa
- Nishantha Ranatunga (March 2009 – July 2011)
- Nishantha Ranatunga (2012–2015)
- Mohan De Silva (2016–2023)

=== Assistant Secretaries ===
- Ravin Wickramaratne (2004)
- Hirvanamuthu Kulendran
- Ravin Wickramaratne (2016–2019)
- Chryshantha Kapuwatta (2019 – present)

=== Treasurers ===
- Tryphon Miranda (2002)
- Nuski Mohamed (2004)
- Sujeewa Rajapakshe (January 2008 – July 2011)
- Nuski Mohamed (2012–2013)
- Shammi Silva (2016–2019)
- Lasantha Wickramasinghe (2019–2022)
- Sujeewa Godaliyadda (2023 – present)

=== Assistant Treasurers ===
- Lucien Merinnage (2004)
- Ajith Sivasamy (2012–2013)
- Shammi Silva (2014–2015)
- Lalith Rambukwella (2016–2019)
- Sujeewa Godaliyadda (2019–2022)
- Lasantha Wickramasinghe (2023 – present)
