= Galle Services Club =

Sports club in Galle, Sri Lanka

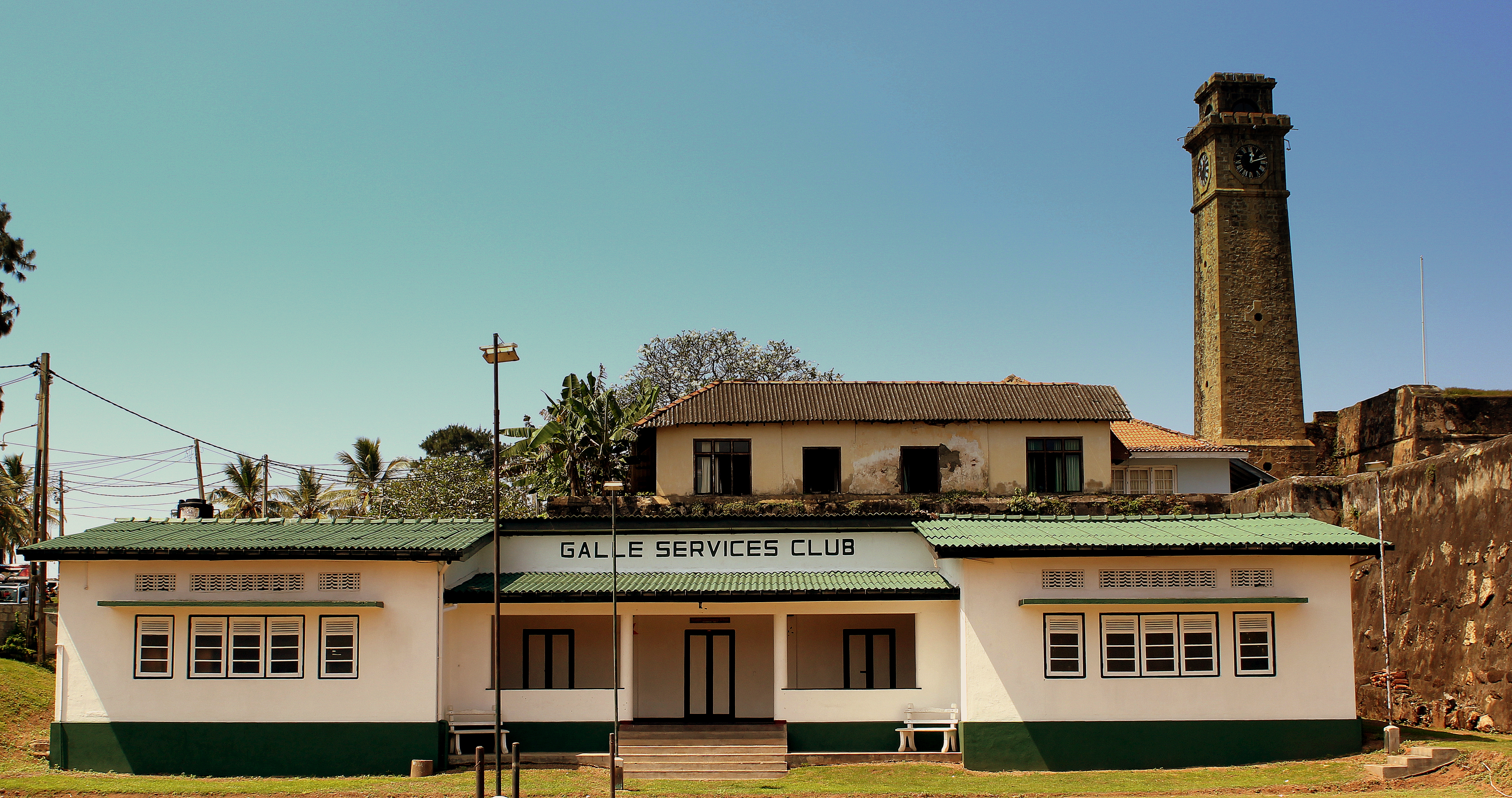
- Galle Services Club (January 2013)

- Location within Sri Lanka
- Former names: Galle Gymkhana Club (1885); Galle Gymkhana Lawn Tennis Club; Galle Tennis Club
- Address: 2 Rampart Street
- Location: Galle, Sri Lanka
- Coordinates: 6°01′47.8″N 80°12′56.6″E
- Events: Sporting and Social Club
- Surface: Hardcourt
- Field shape: Rectangular

Construction
- Opened: 1947; 79 years ago
- Renovated: 2021

Website
- www.galleservicesclub.lk

The Galle Services Club is a social and sports club in Galle, Sri Lanka, which was established in 1947. The club replaced the Galle Gymkhana Lawn Tennis Club, which was originally established in 1885 as the Galle Gymkhana Club.

== History ==
In 1876 a racecourse was established on the Galle Esplanade.

In 1885 the Galle Gymkhana Club was established, and its first secretary was Charles Pickering Hayley (1848–1934), co-founder of the firm Hayley and Kenney (now known as Hayleys PLC Ltd). The club was initially limited to European residents, but with the increasing popularity of horse racing, membership was expanded to include Ceylonese.

The Galle Gymkhana Club was permitted, on nominal terms, to construct a tennis pavilion on grounds, within Galle fort, belonging to the municipality. In 1920 an island-wide open tennis tournament for which the best players from Colombo and elsewhere were able to enter, became a regular annual feature on the race and sports program of the Galle Gymkhana Club.

In 1922 the club shifted its horse racing to the Manning racecourse, a 40 ha (100 acres) freehold site, at Boossa, 8.0 km (5 mi) north of Galle, with stabling for 250 race horses. The clubhouse however remained in its original location, within Galle fort.

The club was later renamed to Galle Gymkhana Lawn Tennis Club.

In 1956 the government banned gambling and betting in the country, which resulted in the subsequent closure of the Manning racecourse. The racecourse has since been converted into a children's playground, opened by the Lions Club of Galle and named after Mahendran Amarasooriya.

In 2021 all four of the courts at the club were refurbished and made hardcourts. This, however, occurred with some controversy, with allegations that the club contravened local traffic laws, prohibiting heavy vehicles entering into the heritage Galle fort area. On 19 February the refurbished courts were formally opened by Dr. Ramesh Pathirana (member for Galle) the president of the Galle Service Club, Dr Daminda Mandawala, and the president of the Sri Lanka Tennis Association, Iqbal Bin Issack.

== See also ==
- Colombo Racecourse
- Galle International Stadium
- Sri Lanka Tennis Association
