= Tamil Union Open Championships =

Defunct tennis tournament
- Tour: ILTF World Circuit (1914–72); ILTF Independent Tour (1973)
- Founded: 1930; 95 years ago
- Abolished: 1973; 52 years ago
- Location: Colombo, Sri Lanka
- Venue: Tamil Union Cricket & Athletic Club
- Surface: Clay

The Tamil Union Open Championships also known as the Tamil Union Open was an open international men's and women's clay court tennis tournament founded in 1930 as the Tamil Union Championships. It was first organised by the Tamil Union Cricket & Athletic Club and first played on clay courts in Colombo, Ceylon then later Sri Lanka. The international tournament was played annually until 1973 when it was discontinued as part of the worldwide ILTF Independent Tour.

== History ==
In 1895 the Lanka Sports Club (f.1895) and in March 1899 the Tamil Sports Club was formed. In December 1899 both clubs merged to form the Tamil Union Cricket and Athletic Club. In 1920 a tennis section was established and three clay courts were built. In 1930 the Tamil Union Championships as an SLTA event was established. The championships became part of the ILTF World Circuit until 1969 (for men) and 1972 (for women). In 1970 the men's event was part of ILTF Independent Tour with the women's tournament joining that tour for 1 edition only in 1973. The event was downgraded from the annual worldwide tour, but it was still being held in 2022 as the Janashakthi Life Tamil Union Open (for sponsorship reasons) a Sri Lanka Tennis Association ranking tournament.

== Finals ==
=== Men' singles ===
(incomplete roll)

Tamil Union Championships
Year	Champions	Runners-up	Score
1930	(Dominion of Ceylon) Oscar Manuel Lisboa Pinto	(Dominion of Ceylon) Hildon Claude Sansoni	6-4, 3–6, 6–1.
↓ Open era ↓
1969	(Dominion of Ceylon) P. Senaka (Sandy) Kumara	(Dominion of Ceylon) Bernard L. Pinto	6–3, 6–3.
1970	(Dominion of Ceylon) P. Senaka (Sandy) Kumara	(Dominion of Ceylon) Neville A.C. Senaratne	6-2, 2–6, 6–4.

=== Women's singles ===
(incomplete roll)

Tamil Union Championships
Year	Champions	Runners-up	Score
1930	(Dominion of Ceylon) Nedra Obeysekera	(Dominion of Ceylon) Gertrude Steiger	6–4, 7–5
↓ Open era ↓
1969	(Dominion of Ceylon) Sria Gooneratne	(Dominion of Ceylon) Lakshmi Mahadevan	6–3, 6–3
1970	(Dominion of Ceylon) Srima Abeyegunawardene	(Dominion of Ceylon) Susima Abeyegunawardene	6–1, 4–6, retd.
