= List of Ceylonese organisations with royal prefix =

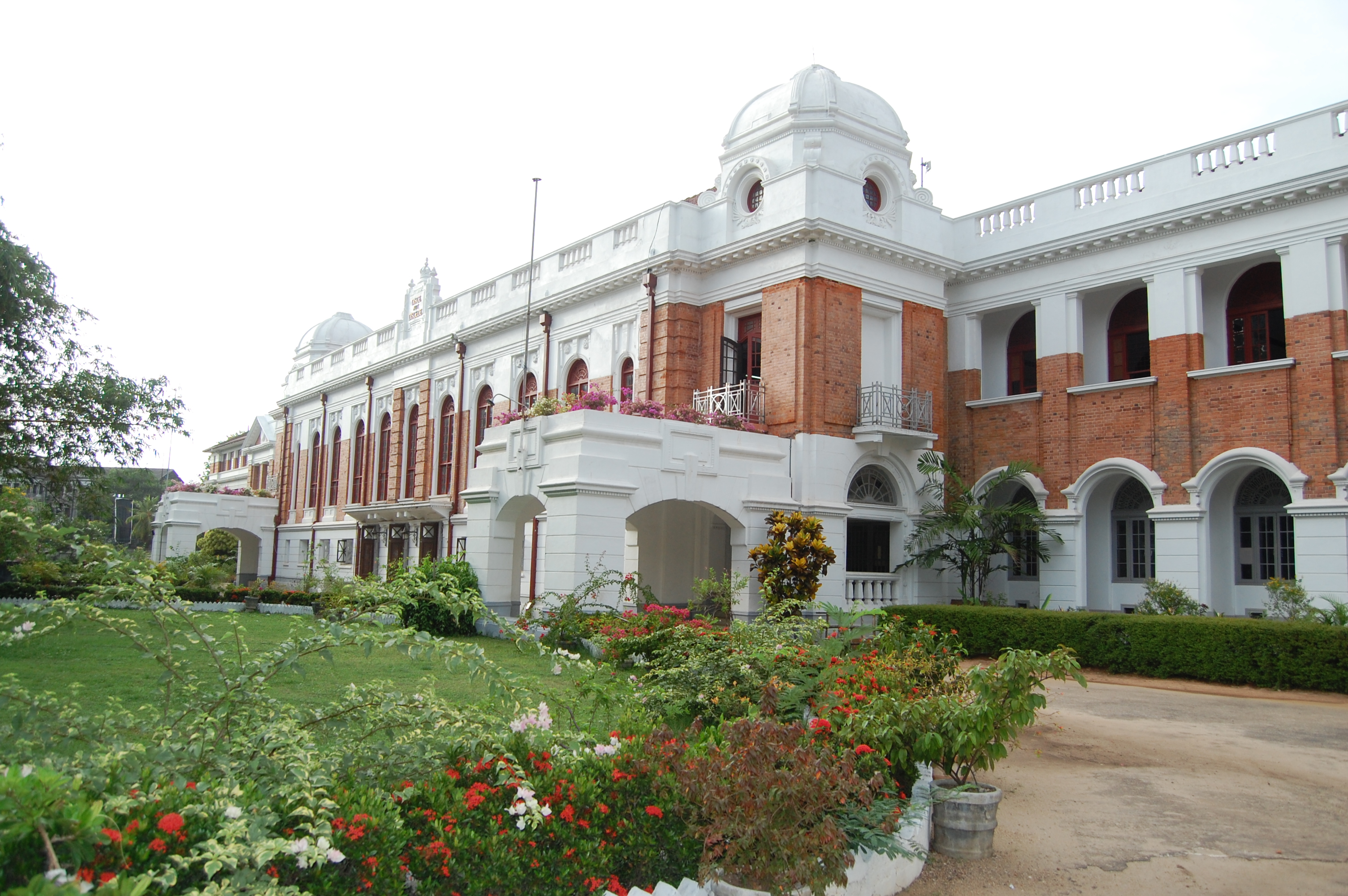
The Royal College Colombo, given its royal prefix by Queen Victoria in 1881. It is under the patronage of the Governor of Ceylon.

This is a list of Ceylonese organisations with designated royal status, listed by the king or queen who granted the designation.

== Civilian ==
Royal prefix granted by Queen Victoria
Year	Organisation
1843	Royal Botanical Gardens, Peradeniya
1845	Royal Asiatic Society of Ceylon
1881	Royal College Colombo

Royal prefix granted by King George V
Year	Organisation
1928	Royal Colombo Golf Club

Royal prefix granted by King George VI
Year	Organisation
1948	Royal India, Pakistan and Ceylon Society

== Military ==
Royal prefix granted by King George VI
Year	Organisation	Renamed as
1943	Royal Ceylon Volunteer Naval Force	Sri Lanka Volunteer Naval Force
1950	Royal Ceylon Navy	Sri Lanka Navy
1951	Royal Ceylon Air Force	Sri Lanka Air Force

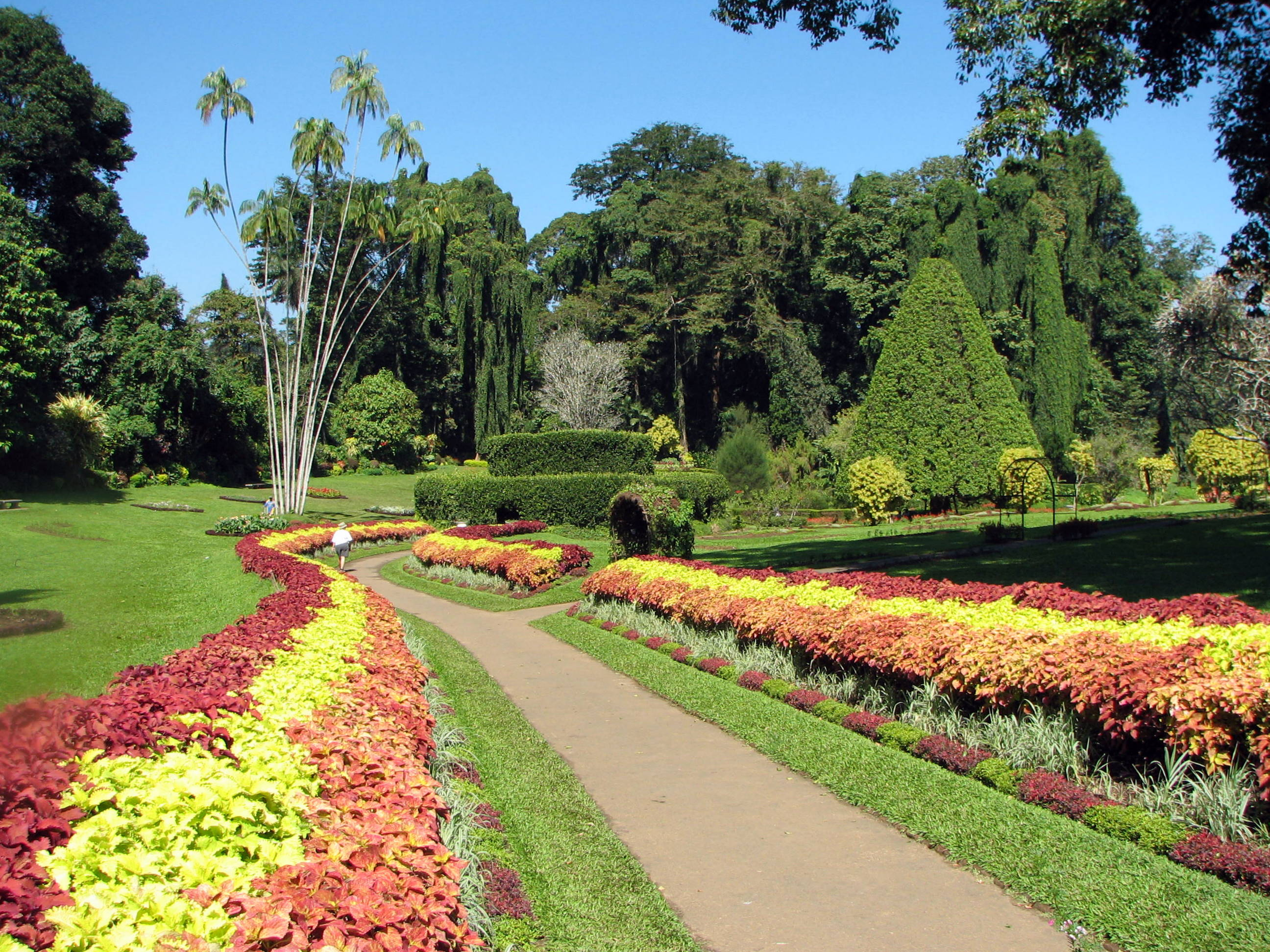
Royal Botanical Gardens, Peradeniya

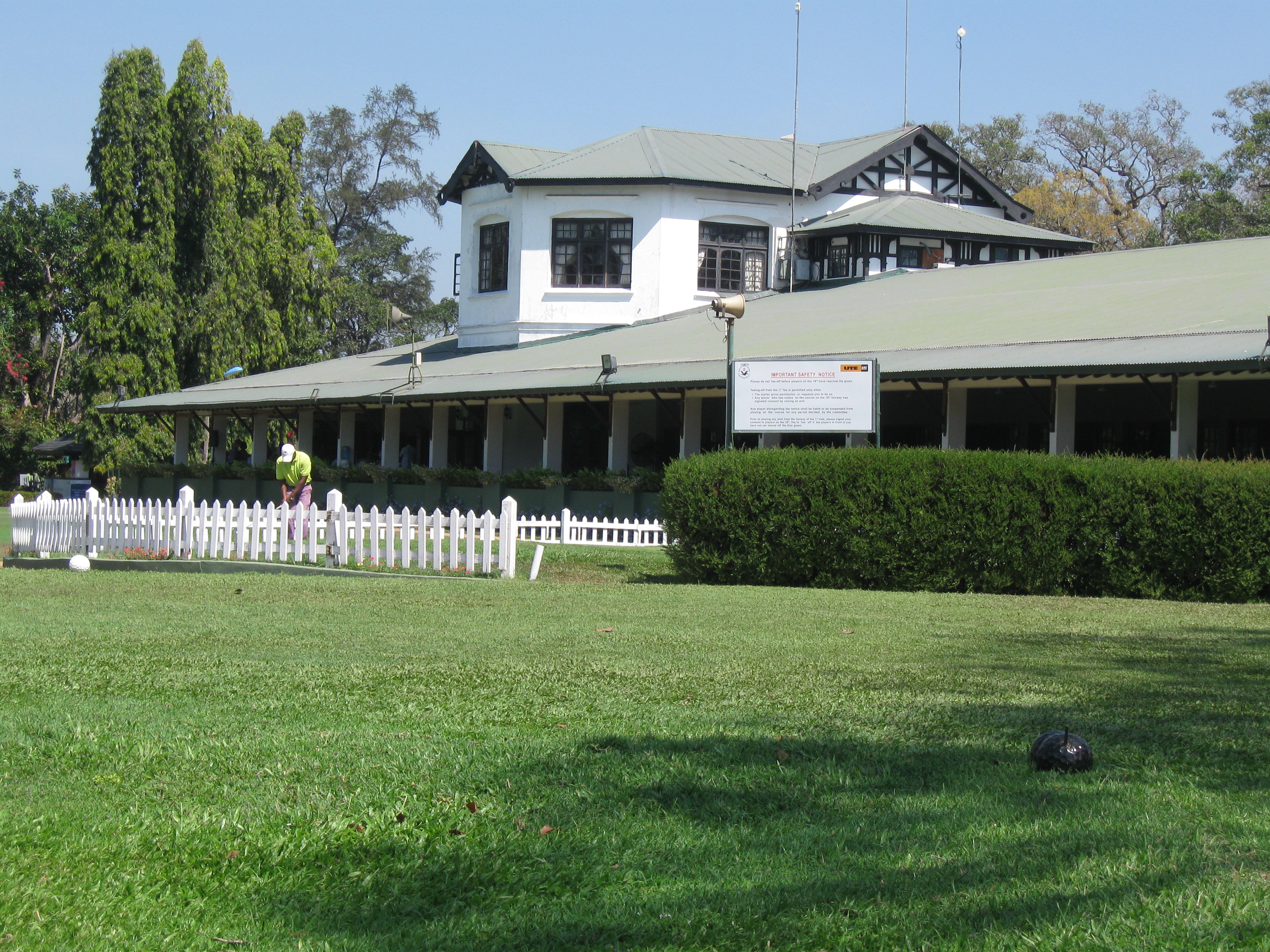
Royal Colombo Golf Club

== See also ==
- List of Canadian organisations with royal prefix
