= Royal Colombo Golf Club =

Golf club in Colombo, Sri Lanka

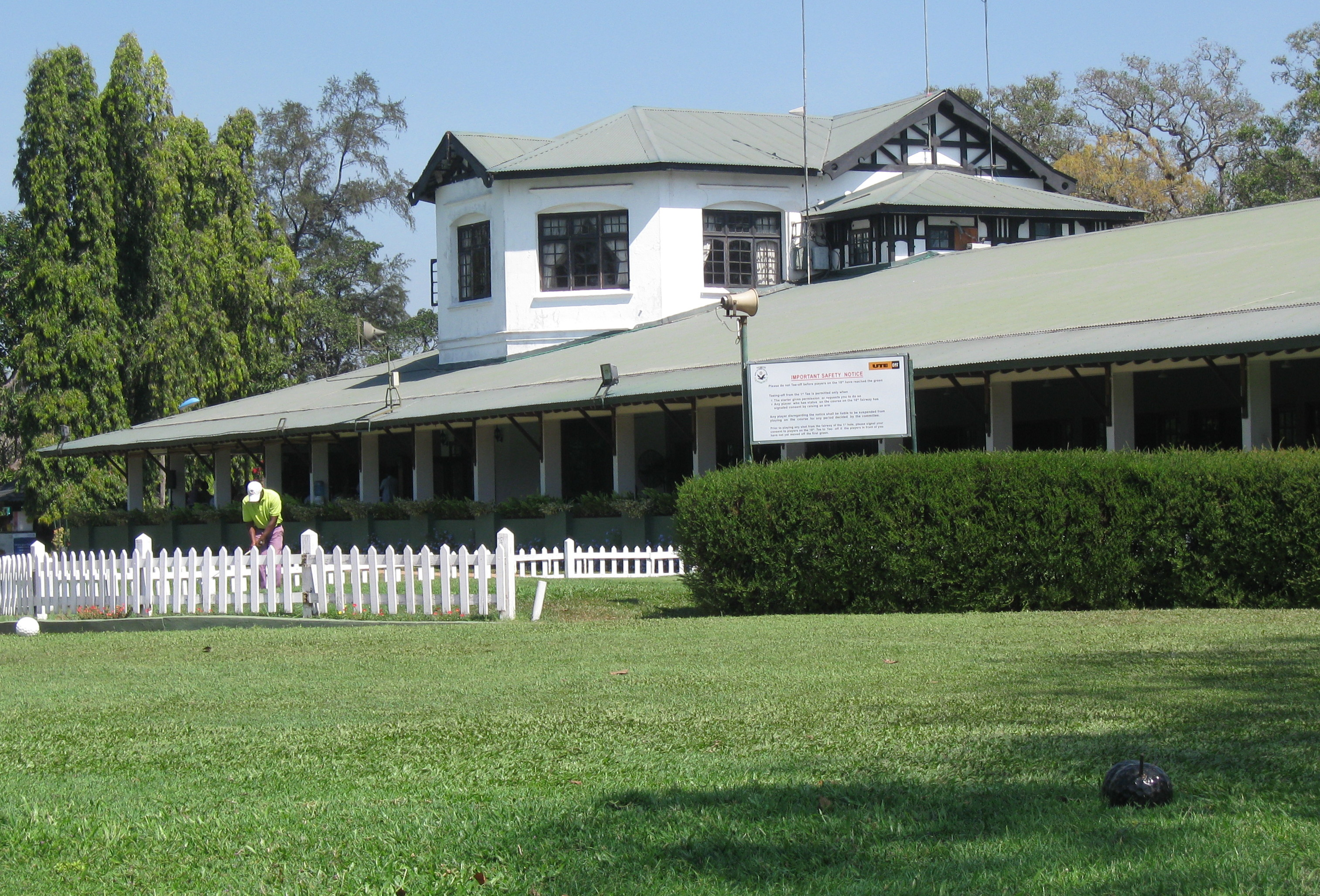

- Location within Greater Colombo
- 6°54′16.36″N 79°52′56.2″E

Club information
- Location: 223, Model Farm Road, Colombo 08, Sri Lanka.
- Established: 13 March 1879; 147 years ago
- Type: Public
- Tota holes: 18
- Greens: Tifeagle Grass
- Fairways: Cow Grass (Crab Grass)
- Website: www.rcgcsl.com
- Par: 71 (Men's); 72 (Ladies)
- Length: 6,560 yards (6,000 m)
- Course rating: 71.3
- Slope rating: 127
- Course record: 63 (Men); 67 (Ladies)

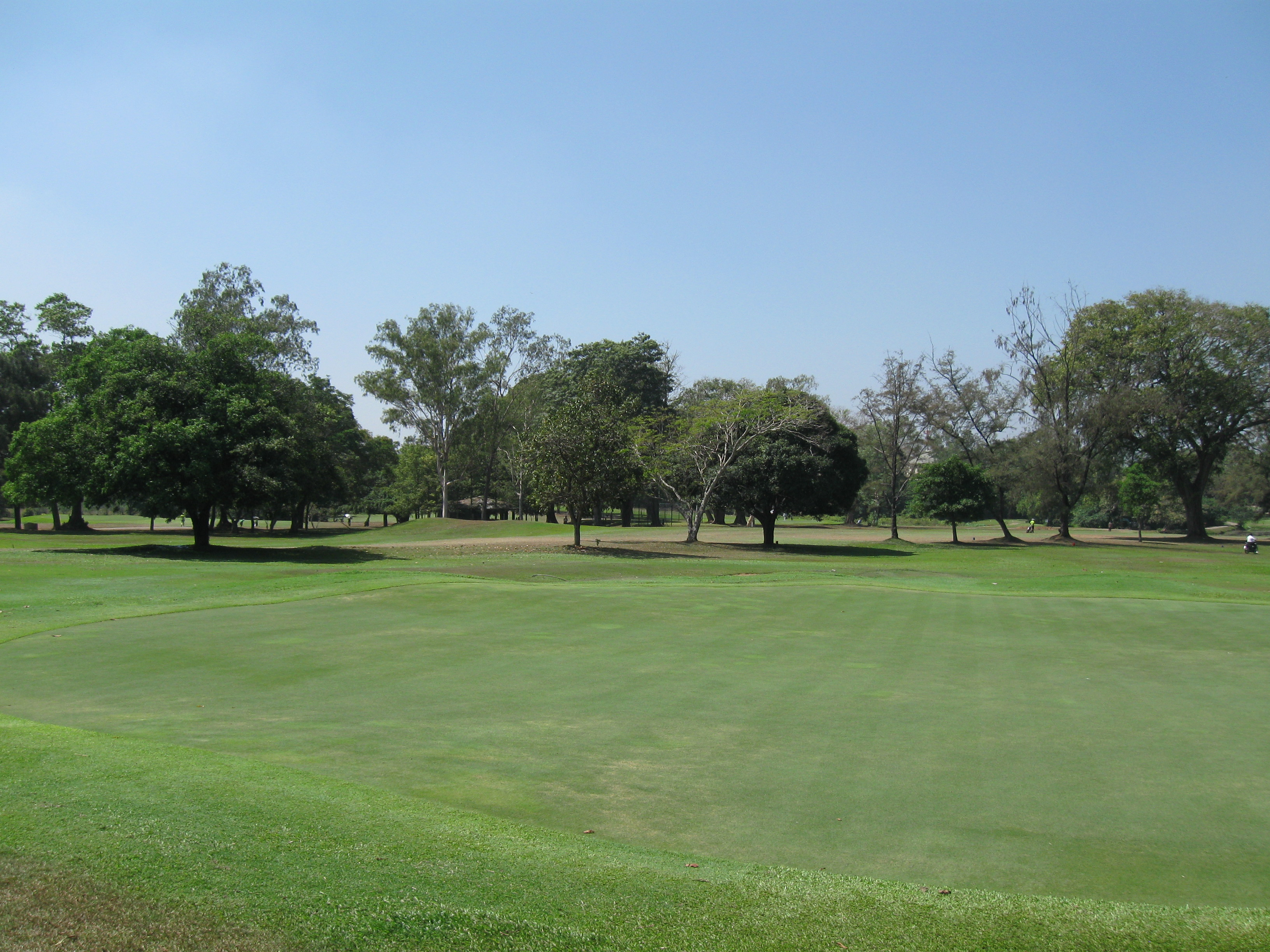
Course of The Royal Colombo Golf Club

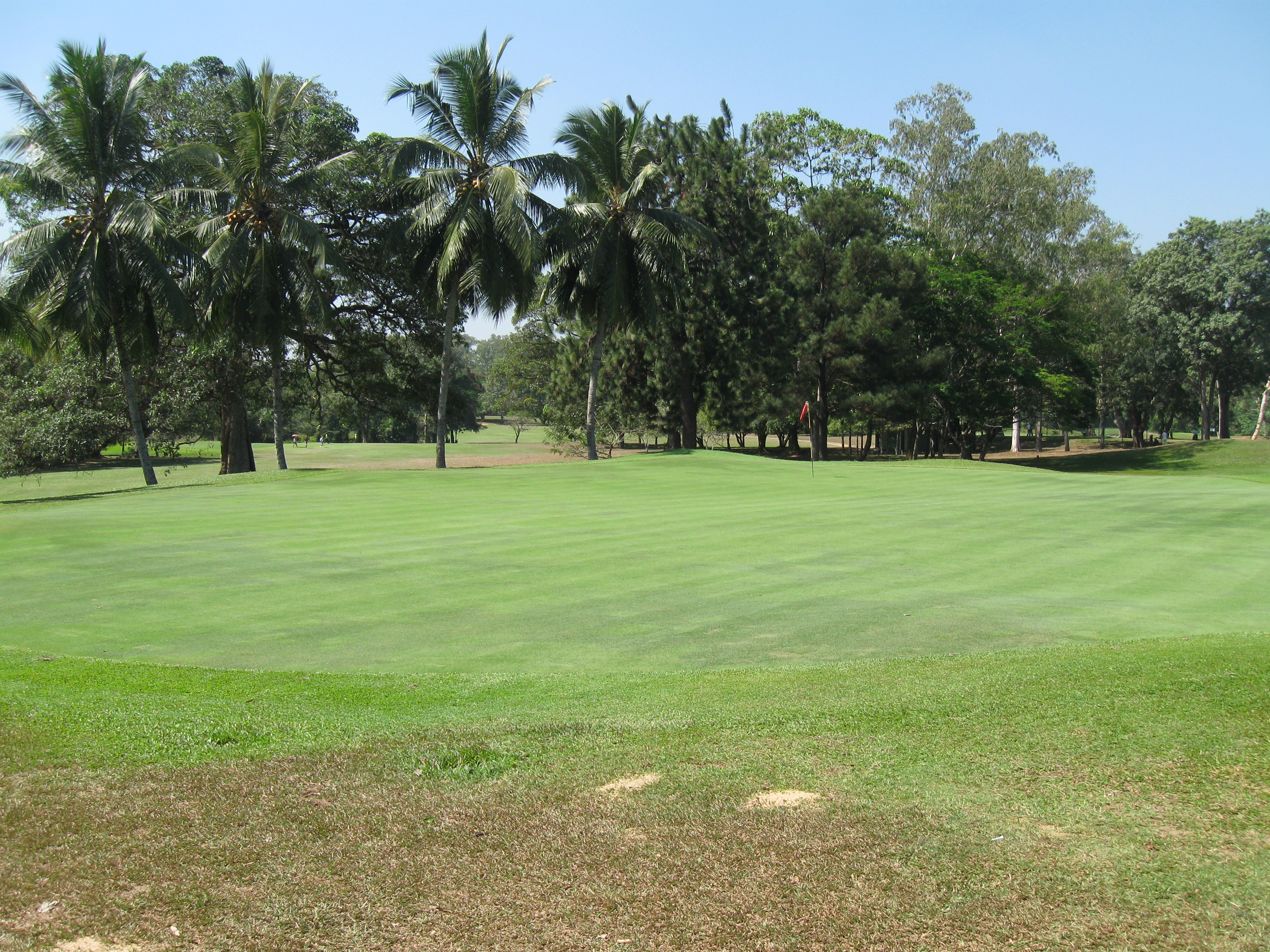
Course of The Royal Colombo Golf Club

The Royal Colombo Golf Club is the oldest golf club in Sri Lanka. Established in 1879, it is located in the capital city of Colombo at The Ridgeway Links also known as the Anderson Golf Course. It is home to the Sri Lanka Golf Union, the governing body of Golf in Sri Lanka and maintains links with The Royal and Ancient Golf Club of St Andrews in Scotland.

== History ==
On 13 March 1880 ten founding members, led by Edward Aitken (founder of Aitken Spence), met at the Colombo Club and held the first General Meeting of the Colombo Golf Club. The first Chairman and Captain was W. Law and the Committee consisted of W. Somerville, F. A. Fairlie and R. Webster. The competitive trophy of the club dates back to 1887. In 1888 the Calcutta Golf Club presented a silver medal to the club; the Calcutta Medal is a permanent challenge medal still contested at the club.

The club was maintained at Galle Face Green until June 1896, when the club was told by the Colonial Secretary that the Governor of Ceylon would give the golf club a part of the Model Farm in Borella. The land and funds for the Model Farm were provided by Sir Charles Henry de Soysa. The golf course was opened in July 1896 by Governor Joseph West Ridgeway, after whom the Ridgeway Links were named. In 1928, King George V bestowed upon the club a royal charter, which enabled the club to use the prefix "Royal", and consequently the club came to be known as the Royal Colombo Golf Club. Originally membership was limited to British and European members, but in 1936 membership was extended to the Ceylonese.

During World War II the clubhouse and the golf links were used by the Royal Navy code breakers of the Far East Combined Bureau and were known as "HMS Anderson".

== See also ==
- List of Sri Lankan gentlemen's clubs
- Nuwara Eliya Golf Club
- List of Ceylonese organizations with royal prefix
- List of golf clubs granted Royal status
