= Eran Wickramaratne =

Sri Lankan politician

Hon. Eran Wickramaratne ඉරාන් වික්‍රමරත්න இரான் விக்கிரமரத்ன MP
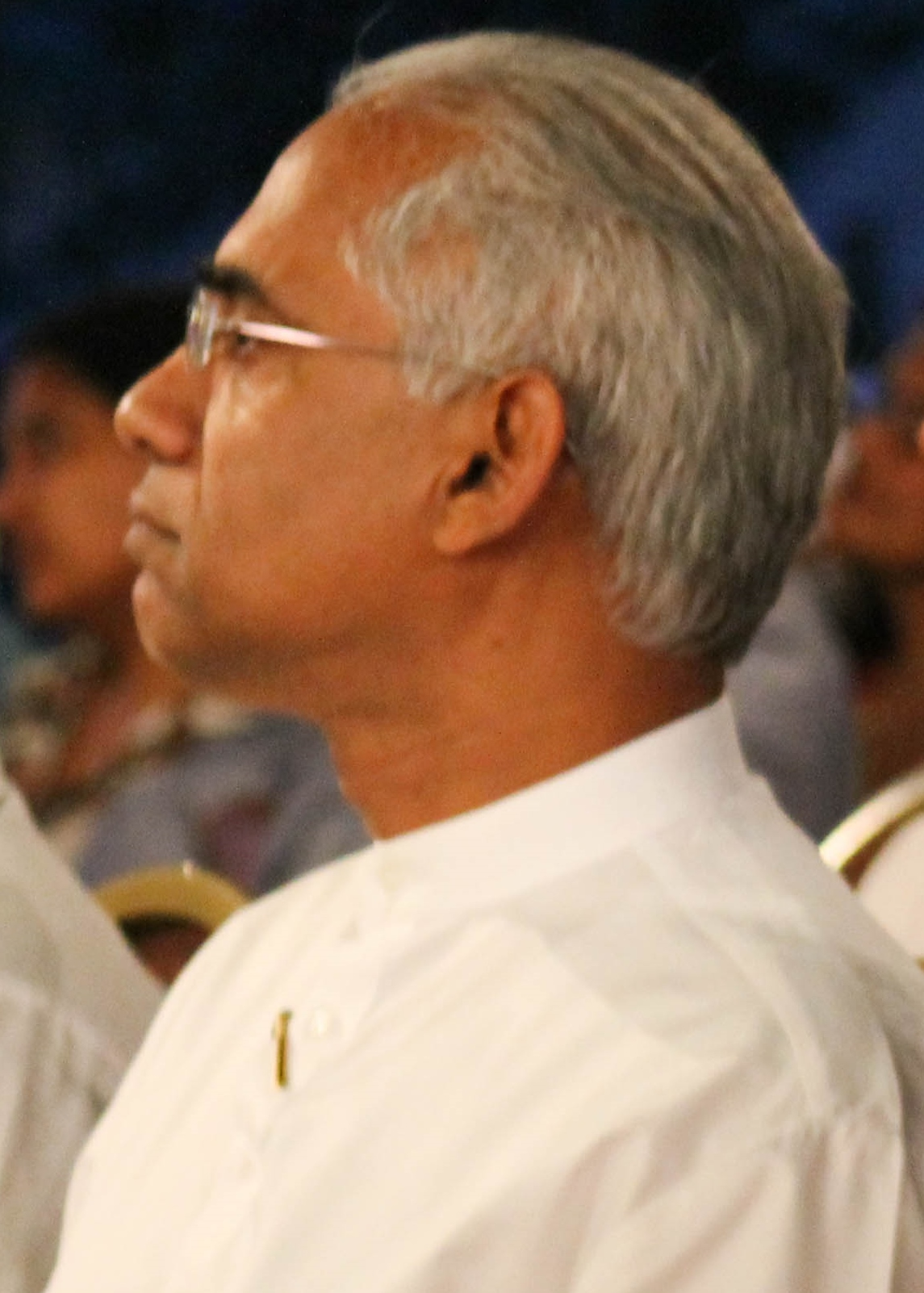

President of Sri Lanka Cricket
- Incumbent
- Assumed office 29 April 2026
- Preceded by: Shammi Silva

State Minister of Finance
- In office 31 May 2017 – 21 November 2019
- President: Maithripala Sirisena
- Prime Minister: Ranil Wickremesinghe

Deputy Minister of State Enterprise Development
- In office 4 September 2015 – 31 May 2017
- President: Maithripala Sirisena
- Prime Minister: Ranil Wickremesinghe

Deputy Minister of Investment Promotions and Highways
- In office 12 January 2015 – 17 August 2015
- President: Maithripala Sirisena
- Prime Minister: Ranil Wickremesinghe

Member of Parliament for National List
- In office 2020–2024
- In office 2010–2015

Member of Parliament for Colombo District
- In office 2015–2020

Personal details
- Born: 1 October 1957 (age 69)
- Party: Samagi Jana Balawegaya (2020 - Present); United National Party (2010 - 2020)
- Spouse: Kushlani
- Children: Dhishan, Sohanya
- Parent(s): Colton (father), Susanne (mother)
- Education: Royal College, Colombo
- Occupation: Politician
- Profession: Banker

Eran Wickramaratne, (Sinhala: ඉරාන් වික්‍රමරත්න) (Tamil: இரான் விக்கிரமரத்ன) MP is a Sri Lankan banker and politician. He is the former State Minister of Finance and member of Parliament of Sri Lanka. He was the Deputy Minister of Investment Promotions and Highways under 100 days program. He was the CEO of NDB Bank from 2001 to 2010 and a former chairman of the Information Communication Technology Agency (ICTA). He is a member of Samagi Jana Balawegaya.

On 29 April 2026, Wickramaratne was appointed chairman of a nine-member interim committee to manage Sri Lanka Cricket.

== Education ==
Educated at Royal College Colombo, he served as Head Prefect and played on the school cricket team, serving as opening batsman in the Royal–Thomian. He gained a BSc in Economics and Politics and an MSc in Economics from the University of London. He is also an Eisenhower Fellow.

== Banking career ==
Having joined Citibank in 1982, he went on to become a vice president in 1996. In 2000, he was involved in founding NDB Bank, where he became CEO in 2001. In 2005, he served as a Director and advisor for Board of Investment (BoI) and later became an adviser to the Ministry of Science & Economic Reform. During this time he was instrumental in the formation of the first Information Communication Act and became the founder chairman of the Information Communication Technology Agency (ICTA). He resigned from his post of CEO of NDB to take up his seat in Parliament in 2010.

== Political career ==
He joined the right of centre United National Party, serving as its treasurer and entered parliament from the National List at the 2010 General Elections. After the election of Maithripala Sirisena, Wickramaratne was appointed as the Deputy Minister of Investment Promotions and Highways in the "good governance" government under the premiership of Ranil Wickremasinghe. He was appointed as the United National Party chief organiser of the Colombo-East electorate before being shifted to the Moratuwa electorate in 2015. In the general election that followed he was elected to parliament from the Colombo district gaining 82,737 votes. In 2015, he was appointed Deputy Minister of Investment Promotions and Highways and in 2017 he was appointed State Minister of Finance, holding office until the appointment in 2019 of a new caretaker cabinet headed by Mahinda Rajapaksa.

== Sri Lanka Cricket ==
On 29 April 2026, Wickramaratne was appointed chairman of a nine-member interim committee (Sri Lanka Cricket Transformation Committee) to manage Sri Lanka Cricket until fresh elections are conducted following the resignation of its president and executive committee earlier that day. The appointment was made by Sunil Kumara Gamage, Minister of Sports and Youth Affairs, to address current issues in the sport and implement structural reforms.

== Family ==
He is the son of evangelical pastor, Rev. Dr. Colton Wickramaratne (1931–2018), and the brother of Rev. Dishan Wickramaratne. He is married to Kushlani and father to two children, Sohanya and Dhishan.
