= Ravin Wickramaratne =

Sri Lankan cricketer (born 1962)

Personal information
- Born: 9 April 1962 (age 64)
- Source: Cricinfo, 1 November 2020

Ravin Wickramaratne (born 9 April 1962) is a Sri Lankan former cricketer. He played in one List A and nineteen first-class matches from 1989 to 1993. After his playing career, he became the Vice-President of Sri Lanka Cricket, and the tournament director of the Lanka Premier League.
