= Galle Face Green =

Park in Colombo, Sri Lanka

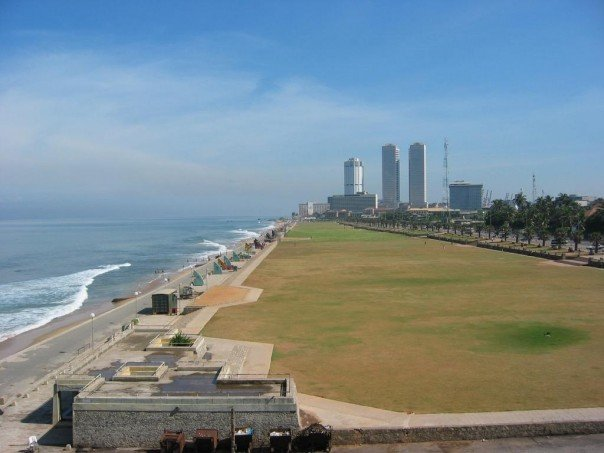
- Galle Face Green facing north
- Interactive map of Galle Face Green
- Type: Urban park
- Location: Colombo in Sri Lanka
- Area: 5.0 hectares (12 acres)
- Operator: Sri Lanka Ports Authority
- Status: Open all year

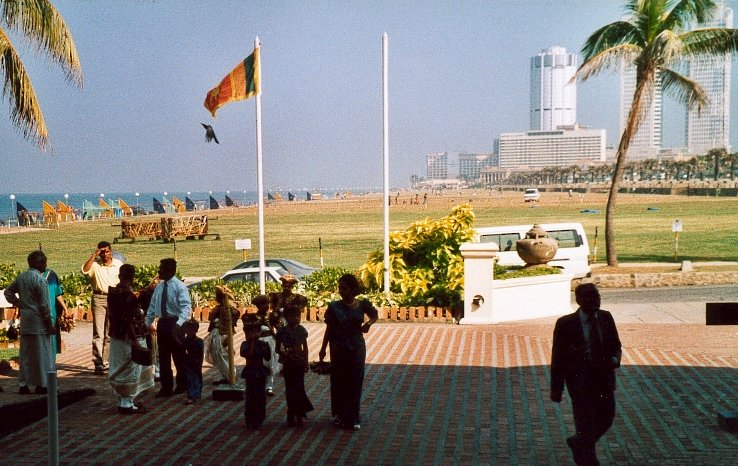
The Galle Face Green runs next to the Indian Ocean

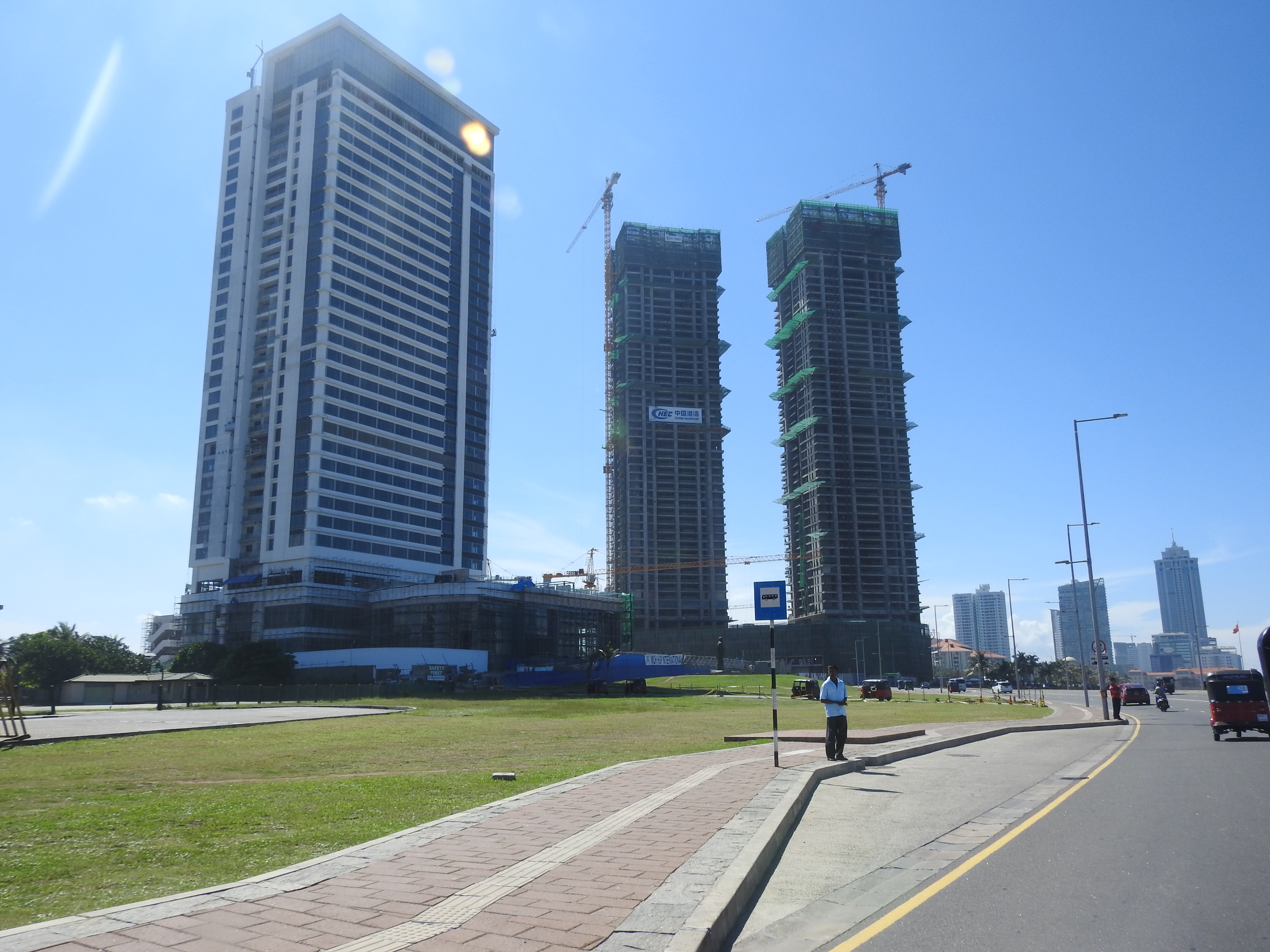
Shangri-La OneGalleFace hotel complex

Galle Face Green is a 5 ha (12 acres) ocean-side urban park, which stretches for 500 m (1,600 ft) along the coast, in the heart of Colombo, the financial and business capital of Sri Lanka. The promenade was initially laid out in 1859 by Governor Sir Henry George Ward, although the original Galle Face Green extended over a much larger area than is seen today. The Galle Face Green was initially used for horse racing and as a golf course, but was also used for cricket, polo, football, tennis, and rugby.

== History ==
Galle Face Green originally extended over a much larger area than exists today. Records indicate that it was bounded to the north by Beira Lake, the ramparts of Colombo Fort and the city's cemetery (established in 1803), to the west by the Indian Ocean, while to the south by the Galle Face Hotel (established in 1864, although the original building on the site was a Dutch villa) and to the east by St. Peter's Church (consecrated in 1821). The Galle Face Green was initially laid out by the Dutch as a means to enable their cannons a strategic line of fire against the Portuguese. One version of how the name Galle Face is derived, is that it is from the original Dutch name for the fortifications, in that the gateway which gave access to the Colombo Fort was called the Gal Gate, as it faced southwards to Galle and faas means front, so it literally means in front of the fortification that faced toward Galle. Another version is it is a corruption of the original name for the area's rocky shoreline, Gal Bokka, Gal being the Sinhalese for rock and that Gal Gate actually meant rock gate.

In 1856 the then Governor of British Ceylon, Sir Henry George Ward (1797–1860) authorised the construction of a 1 mile (1.6 km) promenade along the oceanside of the Galle Face Green, for ladies and children to saunter and 'take in the air'. The promenade was completed in 1859.

=== Horse racing ===
Horse racing began in Galle Face in the early 1820s, during the time of the then British Governor Sir Edward Barnes (1776–1838). The esplanade in front of the fort, previously a marshy area, was filled with earth and levelled for the purpose. The race course was approximately one and a half miles long. The area became known as the Colpetty Race Course, and was used for horse races until 1893 when horse racing moved to the Colombo Racecourse. The Turf and Sporting Club was also founded in the early 1820s, with the first officially recorded horse racing meet held on the Green in the 1821.

To view the races a pavilion was erected at the highest point of the green, it was circular in shape, with wooden framework and a thatched cadjan roof. As the years went by, the pavilion building was improved, with wooden walls replaced by bricks and made larger. A more spacious building, known as the 'Race Bungalow', was subsequently built on the same spot. In September 1870 a viewing gallery was added, which came to be called the 'Grand Stand'. Later a two-storey grandstand was built for members. In 1871 the Race Bungalow became the venue for the Colombo Club and since then it was referred to as the Colombo Club building. This building still stands today, with all its colonial grandeur, and is now the Crystal Ballroom of Taj Samudra Hotel.

=== Golf ===
In 1879, a number of British expatriates introduced golf to Ceylon playing on the Galle Face Green. It was there that they inaugurated the Colombo Golf Club without a clubhouse or a proper golf course. The club had its first Annual General Meeting on 13 March 1880 at the Colombo Club. in 1896 Galle Face was becoming more and more crowded and the golf club faced with having to share the ground with numerous other sports and the general public moved to its present location in Borella.

=== Rugby ===
On 30 June 1879 the first official rugby match in Ceylon was played at Galle Face Green between the newly formed Colombo Football Club and a rest of the world team. Rugby matches were then regularly played in the center of the Colpetty race track, an area shared with the golf club.

=== Cricket ===
The first Royal–Thomian cricket match played between Royal College, Colombo (at that time called Colombo Academy) and S. Thomas' College, Mount Lavinia was played on 15–17 July 1879 at Galle Face Green, which is today the site of the Taj Samudra Hotel. It was said that the two teams had to row across the Beira Lake in boats to reach the Galle Face Grounds. Colombo Academy won the inaugural encounter by 56 runs.

== Current use ==
The Galle Face Green is a 5-hectare strip of land between Galle Road and the Indian Ocean, being the largest open space in Colombo. This is a popular destination for children, vendors, teenagers, lovers, kite flyers, merrymakers and all those who want to indulge in their favourite pastimes next to the sea under the open sky. On Saturday and Sunday evenings, the land is busy with day trippers, picnickers and food vendors selling cooked crabs and prawns, slices of mango with pepper and salt. There are two large hotels that border the strip; the Ceylon Inter-Continental Hotel and at the other by the quaint Galle Face Hotel, one of Sri Lanka's oldest and most popular hotels. It is also used as the site for Sri Lanka's national day celebration held annually on 4 February.

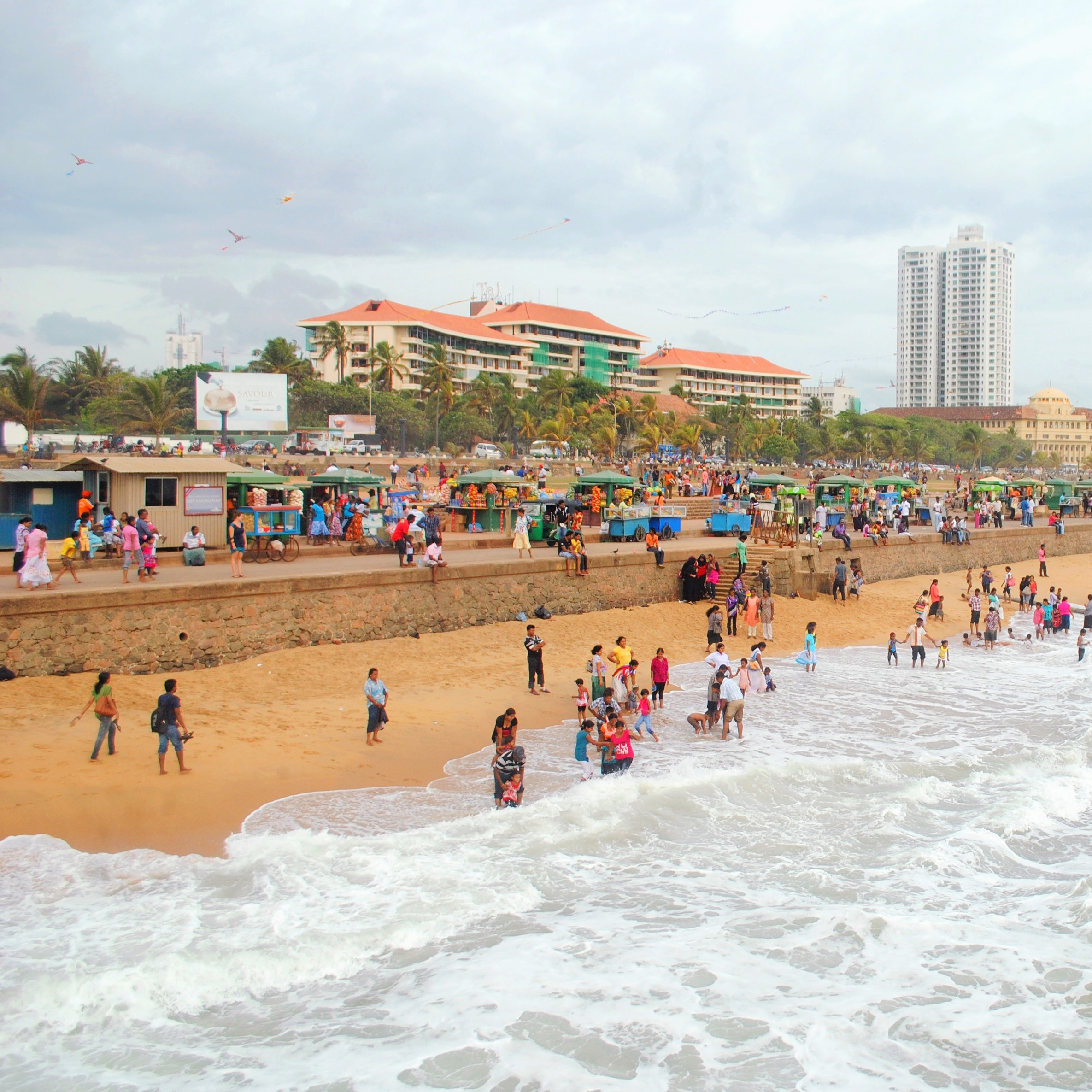
People enjoy the beach at Galle Face beach, Sri Lanka.

Radio Ceylon and subsequently the Sri Lanka Broadcasting Corporation, the oldest radio station in South Asia, has recorded many programs here from their outside broadcast input in the 1950s and 1960s.

The Galle Face Green was administered and maintained by the Urban Development Authority of Sri Lanka until 2014 when the management was transferred to the Sri Lanka Ports Authority. Since 2016 the park is being maintained by Sri Lanka Port Management and Consultancy Services, a government-owned entity operated under the Ministry of Ports and Shipping.

On 25 December 2016 it hosted the world's tallest artificial Christmas tree.

== Occupation of Galle Face Green by protestors ==
Galle Face Green was converted into a temporary protest camp by Sri Lankan protestors during 2022 Sri Lankan protests who were demanding President Gotabaya Rajapaksa resign due to the 2019–present Sri Lankan economic crisis. They occupied the Galle Face Green on 9 April 2022 and set up the protest camp. The camp had all the basic requirements including food, water, toilets, medical facilities and included a lending library.

During the Black Monday attacks on protestors, the temporary protest camps in Galle Face Green was attacked by pro-Rajapaksa partisans of Sri Lanka Podujana Peramuna, at least 8 protesters died and 100 protesters were injured.
