= Colombo Club =

Sri Lankan gentlemen's club

The Colombo Club
- Formation: 4 March 1871; 155 years ago
- Founded at: Galle Face Green
- Purpose: Traditional Gentlemen's Club
- Location(s): 25 Galle Face Centre Road Colombo 03, Sri Lanka
- Coordinates: 6.9229°N 79.8461°E
- Chairman: G. Manik Pereira
- Vice Chairman: Nigel Austen
- Secretary: Kumar Jayasuriya
- Treasurer: Anushya Coomaraswamy
- Website: colomboclub.lk

The Colombo Club is the second oldest gentlemen's club in Sri Lanka.

The Colombo Club was established on 4 March 1871 by prominent British colonialists in the island at the Colpity Race Course Grandstand. The original resolution stating, "That a club be formed for the purpose of establishing and maintaining reading, billiard, card and refreshment rooms in Colombo for the benefit of the members and generally for the carrying out of all purposes incidental to social clubs of the above description. And that the Club be called The Colombo Club."

On 15 July 1871 the club received the official seal approval when the Governor Sir Hercules Robinson agreed to become the club's patron and president. The Colombo Club was the most exclusive club in the country, its membership was limited to British and Europeans until Ceylon gained independence in 1948, thereafter membership was extended to Ceylonese. In 1956 the first Ceylonese member, Dr. H. C. P. Gunawardene, was admitted to the Club and until 1958 the office bearers of the club were all European. In 1995 membership was extended to include women, with Chloe de Soysa become the first female member.

Following Sri Lanka's independence the club house was returned to the government and the club moved to the Grand Oriental Hotel, then to Ceylinco House, then to the Hilton International and after that to the Oberoi Hotel before in 2003 it moved to its present location within the Taj Samudra hotel, which is a member of the Taj Hotels Resorts and Palaces.

The club premises contains a sixty seat dining room, four meeting rooms, a bar, a business centre and a billiards table. The club has 425 members, including 31 life members and has reciprocal arrangements with 52 other similar clubs around the world.

== Past chairmen ==
- Robert Singleton-Salmon
- Mallory E Wijesinghe (first Sri Lankan chairman)
- R. M. Canekeratne
- T. M. Moy
- B. R. Jesudason
- R. S. R. Candappa
- Deshamanya Dev Rodrigo
- T. K. Bandaranayake
- Hemaka Amarasuriya
- Dickie Juriansz
- Sega Nagendra
- G. Manik Pereira

== See also ==
- List of Sri Lankan gentlemen's clubs
