= Criminal Justice Commission (Sri Lanka) =

The Criminal Justice Commission (CJC) were established by the Criminal Justice Commission Act No 14 of 1972, to serve as both a public inquiry and a tribunal to pass sentence. The key aspect of the CJC was that it could accept evidence that would have otherwise be inadmissible under the Evidence Ordinance which governs evidence applicable in court, the shift of burden of proof on the accused and the finding or sentence of the tribunal becoming final and would not be appeal-able. Two Criminal Justice Commissions were formed, the first in 1972 to try the perpetrators of the 1971 JVP insurrection and the second in 1975 to prosecute exchange control offences. The CJC was a controversial legislation and was repealed in 1977 under the Criminal Justice Commissions (Repeal) Law, No. 12 of 1977. General amnesty was issued to all convicted under the two commissions.

== History ==
Following the 1971 JVP insurrection, the government under Prime Minister Sirima Bandaranaike required a swift means of prosecuting the larger number of insurgents in custody, which numbered in the thousands. The concept of a tribunal empowered to inquire and sentence, by passing the normal judicial process that would otherwise take many stages and years was envisioned by Victor Tennekoon, the Attorney General. The government quickly passed the Criminal Justice Commissions Act in parliament and the first Criminal Justice Commission was established by a warrant issued by the Governor General in May 1972.

By 1975, 139 inquires were conducted and 3872 insurgent suspects were charged and 2919 were produced before the commission. 2413 suspects were released under suspended sentences while 258 received terms of rigorous imprisonment, which included 3 imprisonments for life. 50 suspects were acquitted. A second commission was formed in 1976, consisting of three judges. 2520 suspects were released under suspended sentence, while 372 received terms of rigorous imprisonment, which included 5 imprisonments for life. 92 suspects were acquitted. Tyrrel Goonetilleke, Director of the Criminal Investigation Department lobbied for the extension of Criminal Justice Commissions into exchange control violations.

== Jurisdiction ==
The commission would have power and jurisdiction to inquiry into crimes and offences committed throughout Ceylon and inquiries would be judicial proceeding under the Penal Code.

== Membership ==
The first tribunal consisted of five justices of the Supreme Court, appointed by the Chief Justice. The members of the commissions connived and held their hearings at the premises of the Queen's Club in Colombo. Members included;

- Chief Justice H. N. G. Fernando (Chairman)
- Justice A. C. Alles
- Justice V T Thamotheram
- Justice H Dheragoda
- Justice T. W. Rajaratnam (later replaced by Justice D. Wimalaratne)

A second tribunal consisted of three justices. In addition the commission had a Secretary and interpreters.

== Notable convicts ==
=== Insurrection ===
- S. D. Bandaranayake - Sitting Member of Parliament and JVP member
- Rohana Wijeweera - Leader and politburo member of the JVP
- Athula Nimalasiri Jayasinghe - JVP Politburo member and later became a government minister (turned crown witness)
- Jayadeva Uyangoda - JVP Politburo member and later became an academic
- Victor Ivan - JVP Politburo member and later became a journalist
- Mahinda Wijesekara - JVP member and later a government minister
- Upatissa Gamanayake - JVP member and later Deputy leader of the JVP during the 1987–1989 JVP insurrection
- Susil Siriwardene - Director of Agrarian Research and JVP member

=== Exchange control violations ===
- Sir Oliver Goonetilleke - Former Governor General of Ceylon (tried in absentia and sentenced)
- Mubarak Thaha - Nightclub owner
- A.R.M. Mukthar - bookie owner
