= Taj Samudra =

Sri Lankan hospitality company and luxury hotel

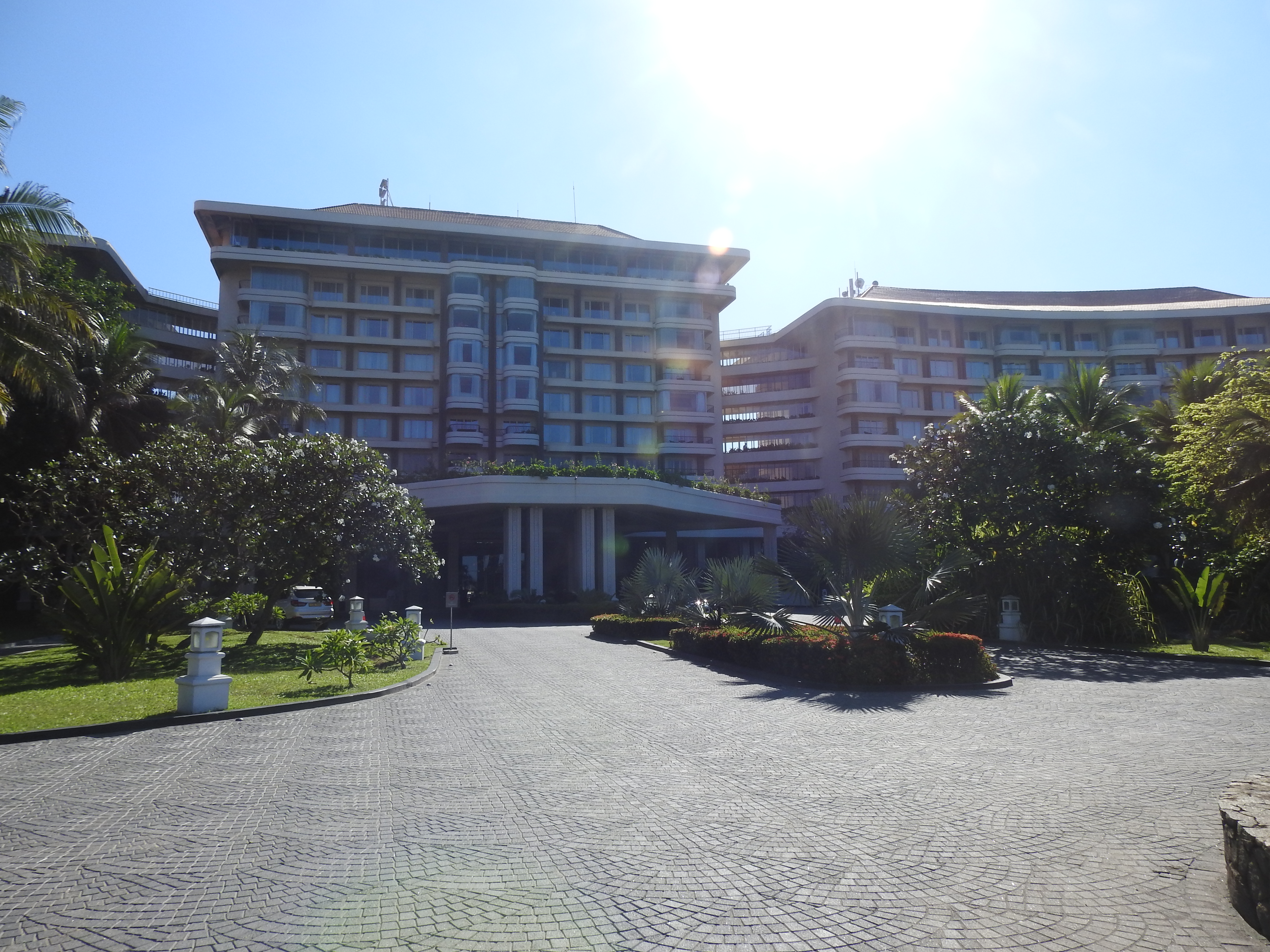
- Taj Samudra Hotel is located opposite Galle Face Green, facing the Indian Ocean
- Company type: Public
- Traded as: CSE: TAJ.N0000
- ISIN: LK0162N00004
- Industry: Hospitality
- Founded: 14 June 1980; 45 years ago
- Headquarters: Colombo, Sri Lanka
- Key people: G. Sanjeevi (Chairman)
- Revenue: ▲LKR2,361 million (2023)
- Operating income: ▲LKR(550) million (2023)
- Net income: ▲LKR(1,291) million (2023)
- Total assets: ▼LKR5,129 million (2023)
- Total equity: ▼LKR(1,488) million (2023)
- Owners: TAL Hotels & Resorts Limited (58.14%); IHOCO B.V. (24.62%); Employees' Provident Fund (5.33%)
- Number of employees: 601 (2018)
- Parent: TAL Hotels & Resorts Limited
- Website: www.tajhotels.com/en-in/taj/taj-samudra-colombo/

Taj Samudra, trading as TAL Lanka Hotels PLC, is a five-star luxury hotel in Colombo, Sri Lanka. The hotel is a listed company on the Colombo Stock Exchange since 1982 and the majority of the shares are held by Taj Hotels. The hotel is located right opposite Galle Face Green facing the Indian Ocean. The hotel is one of the oldest five-star hotels in the city of Colombo. Brand Finance ranked Taj Samudra 78th amongst the 100 most valuable brands in Sri Lanka for 2021.

== History ==
The hotel company was incorporated in 1980 and in 1982 was listed on the Colombo Stock Exchange. Admiral Clancy Fernando, the commander of the Sri Lanka Navy was killed in a suicide bombing in front of the hotel on 16 November 1992. The New Zealand national cricket team was staying at the hotel at the time. After a renovation amounting to US$20 million, the hotel reponed in March 2018. 71 rooms and 15 suites have been renovated with the aim of increasing the occupancy rate by five to eight per cent. Taj Samudra has been named a "Great Place to work" for five consecutive years. Despite that, the employee turnover had increased in Taj Samudra, a study has found in 2018.

=== Easter bombings ===
One of the Easter bombing perpetrators, Abdul Latheef Mohamed Jameel failed to detonate his bomb. His target was the hotel's breakfast buffet. Instead, the perpetrator detonated the bomb in a motel in Dehiwala-Mount Lavinia. The perpetrator entered the Ports of Call buffet restaurant at 08:32 AM. The CCTV footage showed him looking restless and trying to do something. Shortly afterwards, he has exited the hotel with a backpack and two-wheeled luggage.

=== COVID-19 pandemic ===
In 2020 November, four of the staff of Taj Samudra tested positive for COVID-19. During their 2021 Sri Lankan tour, the India national cricket team stayed at the Taj Samudra hotel. Despite having booked the entire hotel for the team, Krunal Pandya, one of the players tested positive for COVID-19.

== Amenities ==
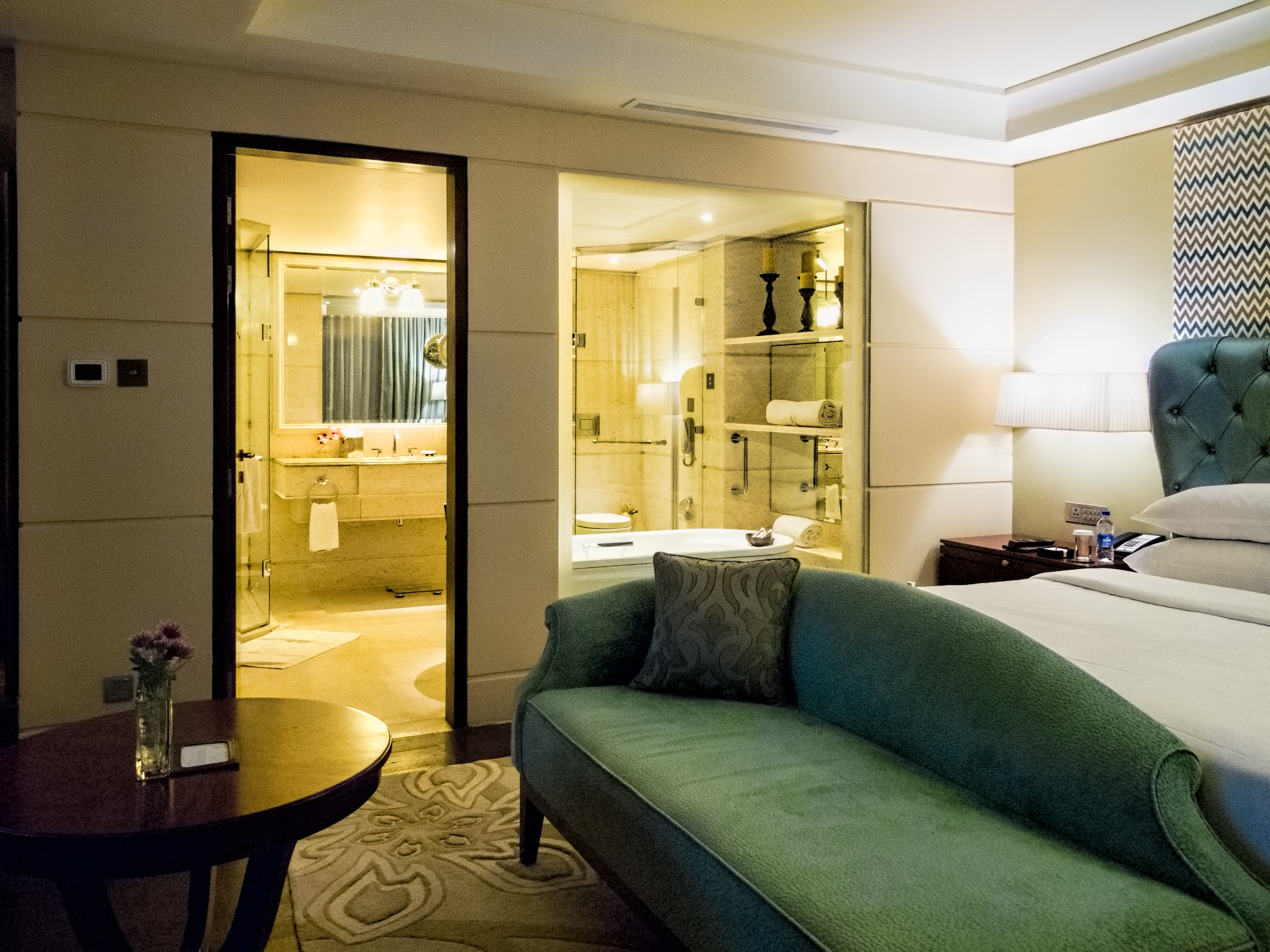
An ocean view room of the hotel

The hotel has 300 rooms and suites with either ocean or city views. The hotel has six restaurants, Navratna, an Indian restaurant, Golden Dragon, a Chinese cuisine restaurant, Crab Factory, the hotel's seafood restaurant, Ports of Call, a buffet and à la carte restaurant, and Pebbles and Lattice, two lounges that serve finger food. The hotel's other amenities include a swimming pool, tennis and squash courts, and a fitness centre. Taj Samudra also has a business centre and provides conference facilities.

== Operations ==
TAL Lanka Hotels also manages the Gateway Hotel Airport Garden, in Seeduwa, near the Bandaranaike International Airport. The Colombo Club is located on the premises of the hotel.

== See also ==
- List of hotels in Sri Lanka
- List of companies listed on the Colombo Stock Exchange
