= Shammi Silva =

Sri Lankan sports administrator (born 1960)

- ශම්මි ශිරාජ් සිල්වා

29th President of Asian Cricket Council
- Vice President: Pankaj Khimji
- Preceded by: Jay Shah
- Succeeded by: Mohsin Naqvi
- In office 6 December 2024 – 3 April 2025
- In office ?? – 29 April 2026

Personal details
- Born: Atulugamage Shammi Shiraj Silva; 7 August 1960 (age 66) Colombo, Dominion of Ceylon
- Spouse: Roberta
- Children: 2
- Education: Nalanda College, Colombo
- Occupation: Cricket Administrator

Atulugamage Shammi Shiraj Silva (Sinhala: අටුලුගමගේ ෂම්මි ශිරාජ් සිල්වා, born 7 August 1960) is a sports administrator, and the former president (2019/2022) of Sri Lanka Cricket. Shammi was elected as President of SLC for another two year term when the election was held on 20 May 2021. Throughout his tenure, Silva and the Sri Lanka Cricket Board has been accused by various parties of corruption, financial mismanagement and match-fixing allegations, sparking public outcry.

He resigned from the post of president of Sri Lanka Cricket on 29 April 2026.

== Early childhood ==
Shammi Silva was born in Colombo and attended Nalanda College, Colombo. At school he played shot put, discus throw and javelin throw. In 1980 Silva captained Nalanda's first XI cricket team.

== Later life ==
After leaving school Silva continued playing cricket and captained Colombo Cricket Club in 1983/84. Silva also played Squash (sport), resulting him winning National Colours and representing Sri Lanka Squash Team. He then became the manager and coach for Sri Lanka Squash team.

Silva was also one time Chairman of the Colombo Gymkhana Club. Silva is also the President of Colombo Gymkhana Club. Sports minister Roshan Ranasinghe has suspended the cricket board headed by Shammi and has appointed former captain Arjuna Ranatunga to head an interim administration of the cricket board.

On 29 April 2026, Silva, along with all office-bearers and members of the executive committee of Sri Lanka Cricket, resigned from their posts with immediate effect.
