= Bassam Beidas =

British-born Lebanese tennis player

- Country (sports): Lebanon
- Born: 26 December 1988 (age 36) London, England
- Height: 6 ft 1 in (185 cm)
- Plays: Right-handed
- Prize money: $12,741

Singles
- Career record: 16–1 (Davis Cup)
- Highest ranking: No. 499 (21 May 2012)

Doubles
- Career record: 5–6 (Davis Cup)
- Highest ranking: No. 694 (30 July 2007)

Bassam Beidas (born 26 December 1988) is a British-born Lebanese former professional tennis player.

== Biography ==
Beidas was born in London, to a Palestinian father and a Lebanese mother who left the country during the civil war. In junior tennis he was ranked in the world's top-20 and was a boys' doubles semi-finalist at the Australian Open, as well as a doubles winner of the Eddie Herr International Championships. After growing up in Egypt, where he was educated at the Manor House School, Beidas came to the United States and played collegiate tennis for Pepperdine University, earning All-American honors three times.

Graduating from Pepperdine in 2011, Beidas reached a best singles ranking of 499 on the professional tour. He won one singles and five doubles titles at ITF Futures level. Between 2011 and 2014 he was a member of the Lebanon Davis Cup team, having previously played a solitary year in 2007. During his Davis Cup career he won 16 of his 17 singles rubbers, with a further five wins in doubles. He retired from professional tennis at the age of 26.

== ITF Futures titles ==
=== Singles: (1) ===
No.	Date	Tournament	Surface	Opponent	Score
1.	May 2011	Morocco F2, Rabat	Clay	(France) Tak Khunn Wang	4–6, 6–1, 6–2

=== Doubles: (5) ===
No.	Date	Tournament	Surface	Partner	Opponents	Score
1.	Jun 2007	Morocco F3, Kenitra	Clay	(Egypt) Mahmoud-Bahaa Hamed	(France) Clément Reix (France) Florian Reynet	2–6, 6–1, 7–5
2.	Jul 2008	Syria F2, Damascus	Hard	(Romania) Ioan-Alexandru Cojanu	(Canada) Pierre-Ludovic Duclos (Russia) Dmitri Sitak	4–6, 7–5, [11–9]
3.	Aug 2009	Egypt F12, Cairo	Clay	(Germany) Omar Altmann	(Italy) Giulio Torroni (Russia) Mikhail Vasiliev	6–2, 6–3
4.	Aug 2009	Egypt F13, Cairo	Clay	(Germany) Omar Altmann	(Egypt) Ramy Kamal Aita (Egypt) Mohamed Moussa	6–7^{(5)}, 6–1, [10–8]
5.	Oct 2011	USA F29, Niceville	Clay	(Czech Republic) Roman Vögeli	(United States) Harrison Adams (United States) Shane Vinsant	6–4, 6–0
