= Nuwara Eliya Golf Club =

Golf club in Sri Lanka

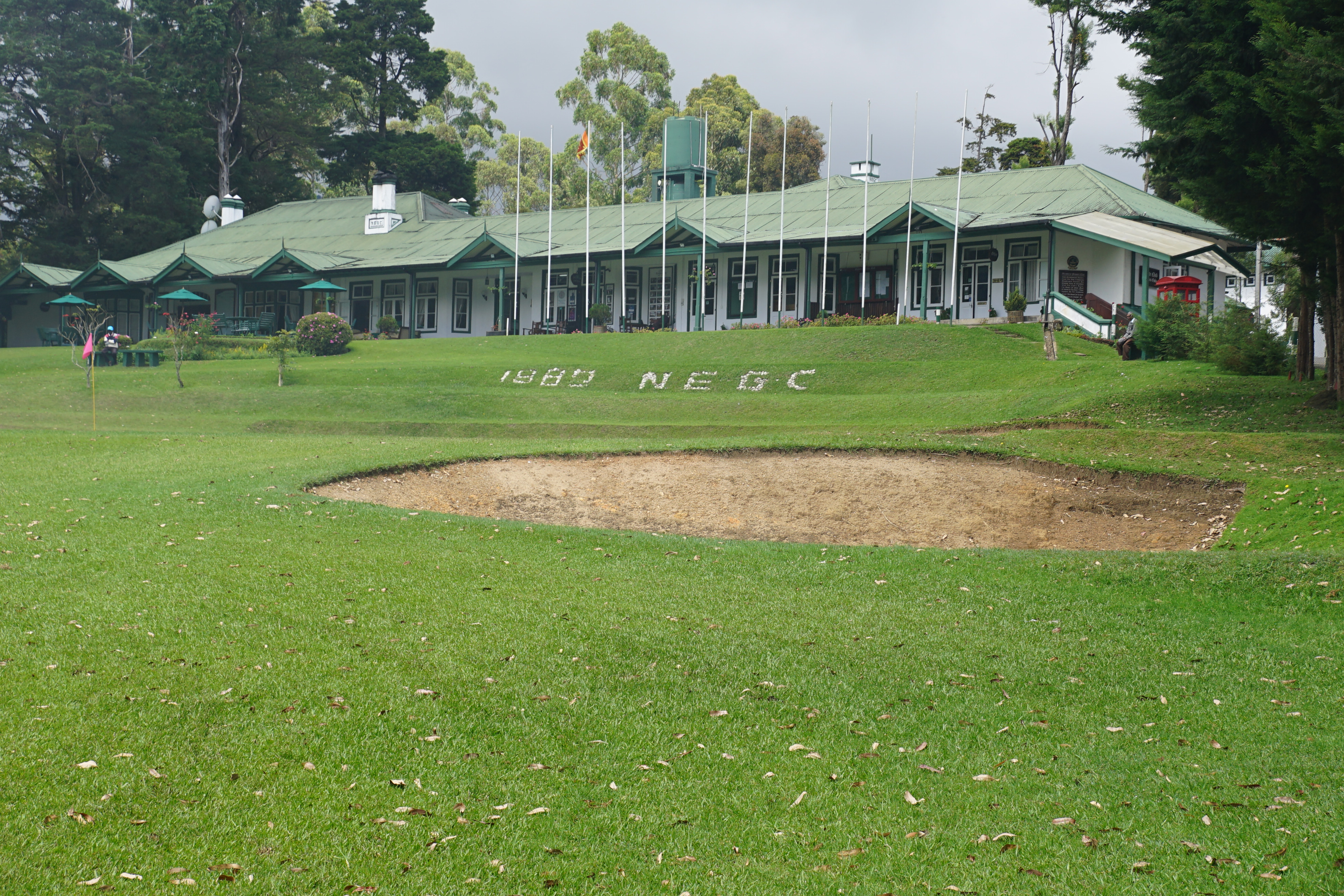

- Location within Sri Lanka
- 6°58′18″N 80°45′53″E

Club information
- Location: Golf Club Road, Nuwara Eliya, Sri Lanka
- Established: 13 March 1889; 137 years ago
- Type: Public
- Tota holes: 18
- Website: www.nuwaraeliyagolfclub.com
- Par: 71 (Mens) 72 (Ladies)
- Length: 6,399 yards (5,851 m)
- Course rating: 68.7
- Slope rating: 129

The Nuwara Eliya Golf Club is one of the oldest Golf Clubs in Sri Lanka. Established in the late 19th century, it is located in the hill station of Nuwara Eliya. It is an 18-hole golf course.

== History ==
The Nuwara Eliya golf course was constructed in 1889 by a Scottish soldier of the Gordon Highlanders for the British servicemen and officials who were posted at Nuwara Eliya. The course opened in 1890 with nine holes and was upgraded and expanded to eighteen holes in 1893. In 1892 a golf pavilion, consisting of five rooms was constructed, overlooking the links.

The course covers approximately 40.5 hectares (100 acres) of land and was originally built amidst the tea plantations of this central highland region. The course is located at an altitude of 1,830 metres (6,000 ft) above sea level. It is an 18-hole, 5,851 m (6,399 yd), Par 70 layout – the scorecard is in metres however the distance from the yardage markers to the edge of the green are measured in yards.

The golf club currently has over 2,000 members.

== See also ==
- List of Sri Lankan gentlemen's clubs
- Royal Colombo Golf Club
