= Colombo Gymkhana Club =

Social club for men in Colombo, Sri Lanka

The Colombo Gymkhana Club
- Abbreviation: CGC
- Predecessor: The Colombo Club (1832)
- Founded at: Galle Face Green
- Purpose: Traditional Gentlemen's Club
- Location(s): 31 Maitland Crescent, Colombo 7
- Coordinates: 6.908676°N 79.865711°E
- Chairman: Shammi Silva
- Secretary: Ashan Welagedara
- Key people: Bernard Russell Kerkoven (Vice Chairman) Kirthsiri de Silva (Treasurer)
- Subsidiaries: Colombo Cricket Club; Colombo Hockey and Football Club; Queen's Club
- Website: gymkhanaclub.lk

The Colombo Gymkhana Club is a social club for men in Colombo, Sri Lanka. It also owns and administers the Colombo Cricket Club, the Colombo Hockey and Football Club and the Queen's Club, as well as the Colombo Cricket Club Ground.

== History ==
Established in 1863, it was the successor to the original Colombo Club (established in the early 1800s), and by 1899 administered five different sports via their ownership/establishment of the Colombo Cricket Club (established informally in 1832; formally in 1863), the Colombo Hockey and Football Club (established in 1892), and the Queen's Club (for squash and tennis; established in 1899).

Until 1964, the social club was exclusive to Europeans (the cricket club having had a similar policy until 1962)- the first Sri Lankan Chairman of the Gymkhana Club was P.S.C. Fernando, while the sporting clubs saw their first local captains in the 1970s:

- Colombo Cricket Club: Travis Fernando (1971)
- CH&FC, rugby: Bryan Baptist (1971)
- CH&FC, hockey: Colonel S. Gajendran (1972)

== Controversy ==
In November 2016, members of the club filed lawsuits against the chairman, Shammi Silva, and treasurer, Kapila Ranasinghe, for breach of trust and breach of contract through violation of the club constitution and the club's land lease agreement with the government, also alleging nepotism and corruption. Silva refuted the allegations against him, alleging in turn that the property development agreement in question had been signed during a previous administration, and that he was only seeking to implement it.

The club was also the subject of an Internal Revenue Department investigation and raid in 2016 for alleged tax evasion.
