= 2008 Davis Cup Asia/Oceania Zone Group III =

International tennis competition

The Group III tournament was held April 9–13, in Enghelab Sports Complex, Tehran, Iran, on outdoor clay courts.

== Format ==
The eight teams were split into two groups and played in a round-robin format. The top two teams of each group advanced to the promotion pool, from which the two top teams were promoted to the Asia/Oceania Zone Group II in 2009. The bottom two teams of each group were placed in the relegation pool, from which the two bottom teams were demoted to the Asia/Oceania Zone Group IV in 2009.

== Pool A ==
	Group A	PAK	SYR	VIE	UAE
1	Pakistan (3–0)		3–0	3–0	3–0
2	Syria (2–1)	0–3		2–1	3–0
3	Vietnam (1–2)	0–3	1–2		3–0
4	United Arab Emirates (0–3)	0–3	0–3	0–3	

=== Pakistan vs. United Arab Emirates ===
Pakistan
3
Enghelab Sports Complex, Tehran, Iran
9 April 2008
Clay

United Arab Emirates
0

			1	2	3
1	(Pakistan) (United Arab Emirates)	Aqeel Khan; Hamad Abbas Janahi	6; 1	6; 1
2	(Pakistan) (United Arab Emirates)	Aisam Qureshi; Mahmoud Nader Al Blooshi	6; 3	6; 3
3	(Pakistan) (United Arab Emirates)	Mohammadi Jibran Ahmed / Asim Shafik; Khaled Al Hassani / Faisal Bastaki	6; 1	6; 3

=== Vietnam vs. Syria ===
Vietnam
1
Enghelab Sports Complex, Tehran, Iran
9 April 2008
Clay

Syria
2

			1	2	3
1	(Vietnam) (Syria)	Đỗ Minh Quân; Romain Radwan	6^{5} 7^{7}	6^{5} 7^{7}
2	(Vietnam) (Syria)	Ngô Quang Huy; Issam Haitham Taweel	5; 7	2; 6
3	(Vietnam) (Syria)	Lê Quốc Khánh / Trần Thanh Hoàng; Hayan Maarouf / Majdi Salim	6; 4	7; 5

=== Pakistan vs. Vietnam ===
Pakistan
3
Enghelab Sports Complex, Tehran, Iran
10 April 2008
Clay

Vietnam
0

			1	2	3
1	(Pakistan) (Vietnam)	Aqeel Khan; Đỗ Minh Quân	6; 2	6; 3
2	(Pakistan) (Vietnam)	Aisam Qureshi; Ngô Quang Huy	6; 2	6; 4
3	(Pakistan) (Vietnam)	Mohammadi Jibran Ahmed / Asim Shafik; Đỗ Minh Quân / Lê Quốc Khánh	6; 2	6; 2

=== United Arab Emirates vs. Syria ===
United Arab Emirates
0
Enghelab Sports Complex, Tehran, Iran
10 April 2008
Clay

Syria
3

			1	2	3
1	(United Arab Emirates) (Syria)	Hamad Abbas Janahi; Romain Radwan	2; 6	1; 6
2	(United Arab Emirates) (Syria)	Mahmoud Nader Al Blooshi; Issam Haitham Taweel	4; 6	2; 6
3	(United Arab Emirates) (Syria)	Mahmoud Nader Al Blooshi / Hamad Abbas Janahi; Hayan Maarouf / Majdi Salim	2; 6	3; 6

=== Pakistan vs. Syria ===
Pakistan
3
Enghelab Sports Complex, Tehran, Iran
11 April 2008
Clay

Syria
0

			1	2	3
1	(Pakistan) (Syria)	Aqeel Khan; Romain Radwan	6; 2	6; 1
2	(Pakistan) (Syria)	Aisam Qureshi; Issam Haitham Taweel	6; 1	6^{3} 7^{7}	7^{7} 6^{4}
3	(Pakistan) (Syria)	Mohammadi Jibran Ahmed / Asim Shafik; Hayan Maarouf / Majdi Salim	6; 2	3; 6	6; 4

=== Vietnam vs. United Arab Emirates ===
Vietnam
3
Enghelab Sports Complex, Tehran, Iran
11 April 2008
Clay

United Arab Emirates
0

			1	2	3
1	(Vietnam) (United Arab Emirates)	Đỗ Minh Quân; Hamad Abbas Janahi	6^{4} 7^{7}	7; 5	6; 4
2	(Vietnam) (United Arab Emirates)	Ngô Quang Huy; Mahmoud Nader Al Blooshi	7^{7} 6^{1}	6; 2
3	(Vietnam) (United Arab Emirates)	Lê Quốc Khánh / Trần Thanh Hoàng; Khaled Al Hassani / Faisal Bastaki	6; 0	6; 3

== Pool B ==
	Group B	MAS	IRI	SRI	TJK
1	Malaysia (3–0)		2–1	2–1	2–1
2	Iran (2–1)	1–2		2–1	3–0
3	Sri Lanka (1–2)	1–2	1–2		2–1
4	Tajikistan (0–3)	1–2	0–3	1–2	

=== Sri Lanka vs. Malaysia ===
Sri Lanka
1
Enghelab Sports Complex, Tehran, Iran
9 April 2008
Clay

Malaysia
2

			1	2	3
1	(Sri Lanka) (Malaysia)	Rajeev Rajapakse; Si Yew Ming	2; 6	5; 7
2	(Sri Lanka) (Malaysia)	Harshana Godamanna; Selvam Veerasingam	4; 6	6; 3	3; 6
3	(Sri Lanka) (Malaysia)	Harshana Godamanna / Rajeev Rajapakse; Adam Jaya / Si Yew Ming	6; 3	7^{7} 6^{5}

=== Iran vs. Tajikistan ===
Iran
3
Enghelab Sports Complex, Tehran, Iran
9 April 2008
Clay

Tajikistan
0

			1	2	3
1	(Iran) (Tajikistan)	Rouzbeh Kamran; Sergey Makashin	4; 6	6; 3	6; 1
2	(Iran) (Tajikistan)	Benjamin Ebrahimzadeh; Anvar Rakhmatov	6; 3	6; 0
3	(Iran) (Tajikistan)	Benjamin Ebrahimzadeh / Rouzbeh Kamran; Anvar Rakhmatov / Mirkhusein Yakhyaev	6; 4	6; 1

=== Sri Lanka vs. Iran ===
Sri Lanka
1
Enghelab Sports Complex, Tehran, Iran
10 April 2008
Clay

Iran
2

			1	2	3
1	(Sri Lanka) (Iran)	Rajeev Rajapakse; Rouzbeh Kamran	1; 6	5; 7
2	(Sri Lanka) (Iran)	Harshana Godamanna; Benjamin Ebrahimzadeh	6; 1	3; 6	2; 6
3	(Sri Lanka) (Iran)	Harshana Godamanna / Rajeev Rajapakse; Rouzbeh Kamran / Omid Souri	7; 5	6; 1

=== Malaysia vs. Tajikistan ===
Malaysia
2
Enghelab Sports Complex, Tehran, Iran
10 April 2008
Clay

Tajikistan
1

			1	2	3
1	(Malaysia) (Tajikistan)	Adam Jaya; Sergey Makashin	3; 6	3; 6
2	(Malaysia) (Tajikistan)	Si Yew Ming; Anvar Rakhmatov	6; 2	6; 4
3	(Malaysia) (Tajikistan)	Si Yew Ming / Selvam Veerasingam; Sergey Makashin / Mirkhusein Yakhyaev	7; 5	6; 4

=== Sri Lanka vs. Tajikistan ===
Sri Lanka
2
Enghelab Sports Complex, Tehran, Iran
11 April 2008
Clay

Tajikistan
1

			1	2	3
1	(Sri Lanka) (Tajikistan)	Rajeev Rajapakse; Mirkhusein Yakhyaev	6; 2	6; 0
2	(Sri Lanka) (Tajikistan)	Harshana Godamanna; Sergey Makashin	6; 1	6; 0
3	(Sri Lanka) (Tajikistan)	Rajeev Rajapakse / Dinusha Wijesuriya; Anvar Rakhmatov / Mirkhusein Yakhyaev	6^{4} 7^{7}	4; 6

=== Iran vs. Malaysia ===
Iran
1
Enghelab Sports Complex, Tehran, Iran
11 April 2008
Clay

Malaysia
2

			1	2	3
1	(Iran) (Malaysia)	Rouzbeh Kamran; Si Yew Ming	6; 3	4; 6	6^{7} 7^{9}
2	(Iran) (Malaysia)	Benjamin Ebrahimzadeh; Selvam Veerasingam	7^{7} 6^{4}	6; 1
3	(Iran) (Malaysia)	Benjamin Ebrahimzadeh / Rouzbeh Kamran; Adam Jaya / Si Yew Ming	6^{4} 7^{7}	2; 6

== Promotion pool ==
The top two teams from each of Pools A and B advanced to the Promotion pool. Results and points from games against the opponent from the preliminary round were carried forward.

(scores in italics carried over from Groups)

	1st–4th Play-off	PAK	MAS	SYR	IRI
1	Pakistan (3–0)		3–0	3–0	3–0
2	Malaysia (2–1)	0–3		3–0	2–1
3	Syria (1–2)	0–3	0–3		2–1
4	Iran (0–3)	0–3	1–2	1–2	

Pakistan and Malaysia promoted to Group II in 2009.

=== Pakistan vs. Iran ===
Pakistan
3
Enghelab Sports Complex, Tehran, Iran
12 April 2008
Clay

Iran
0

			1	2	3
1	(Pakistan) (Iran)	Aqeel Khan; Rouzbeh Kamran	6; 1	6; 3
2	(Pakistan) (Iran)	Aisam Qureshi; Benjamin Ebrahimzadeh	6; 2	7^{7} 6^{1}
3	(Pakistan) (Iran)	Aqeel Khan / Aisam Qureshi; Rouzbeh Kamran / Omid Souri	7; 5	4; 6	6; 1

=== Malaysia vs. Syria ===
Malaysia
3
Enghelab Sports Complex, Tehran, Iran
12 April 2008
Clay

Syria
0

			1	2	3
1	(Malaysia) (Syria)	Si Yew Ming; Romain Radwan	7^{7} 6^{5}	6; 2
2	(Malaysia) (Syria)	Selvam Veerasingam; Issam Haitham Taweel	6; 4	6; 4
3	(Malaysia) (Syria)	Adam Jaya / Razlan Rawi; Hayan Maarouf / Majdi Salim	7; 5	6; 3

=== Pakistan vs. Malaysia ===
Pakistan
3
Enghelab Sports Complex, Tehran, Iran
13 April 2008
Clay

Malaysia
0

			1	2	3
1	(Pakistan) (Malaysia)	Aqeel Khan; Adam Jaya	7^{7} 6^{5}	6; 0
2	(Pakistan) (Malaysia)	Aisam Qureshi; Razlan Rawi	6; 4	6; 0
3	(Pakistan) (Malaysia)	Mohammadi Jibran Ahmed / Asim Shafik; Razlan Rawi / Si Yew Ming	7^{7} 6^{3}	6; 3

=== Iran vs. Syria ===
Iran
1
Enghelab Sports Complex, Tehran, Iran
13 April 2008
Clay

Syria
2

			1	2	3
1	(Iran) (Syria)	Omid Souri; Romain Radwan	3; 6	4; 6
2	(Iran) (Syria)	Rouzbeh Kamran; Issam Haitham Taweel	6; 2	7; 5
3	(Iran) (Syria)	Benjamin Ebrahimzadeh / Rouzbeh Kamran; Hayan Maarouf / Majdi Salim	4; 6	6; 4	6^{3} 7^{7}

== Relegation pool ==
The bottom two teams from Pools A and B were placed in the relegation group. Results and points from games against the opponent from the preliminary round were carried forward.

(scores in italics carried over from Groups)

	5th–8th Play-off	SRI	TJK	VIE	UAE
1	Sri Lanka (3–0)		2–1	3–0	3–0
2	Tajikistan (2–1)	1–2		3–0	2–1
3	Vietnam (1–2)	0–3	0–3		3–0
4	United Arab Emirates (0–3)	0–3	1–2	0–3	

Vietnam and United Arab Emirates relegated to Group IV in 2009.

=== Sri Lanka vs. United Arab Emirates ===
Sri Lanka
3
Enghelab Sports Complex, Tehran, Iran
12 April 2008
Clay

United Arab Emirates
0

			1	2	3
1	(Sri Lanka) (United Arab Emirates)	Rajeev Rajapakse; Faisal Bastaki	6; 3	6; 1
2	(Sri Lanka) (United Arab Emirates)	Harshana Godamanna; Hamad Abbas Janahi	6; 1	6; 0
3	(Sri Lanka) (United Arab Emirates)	Harshana Godamanna / Rajeev Rajapakse; Khaled Al Hassani / Faisal Bastaki	6; 2	6; 1

=== Vietnam vs. Tajikistan ===
Vietnam
0
Enghelab Sports Complex, Tehran, Iran
12 April 2008
Clay

Tajikistan
3

			1	2	3
1	(Vietnam) (Tajikistan)	Đỗ Minh Quân; Sergey Makashin	2; 6	0; 6
2	(Vietnam) (Tajikistan)	Ngô Quang Huy; Anvar Rakhmatov	4; 6	6^{4} 7^{7}
3	(Vietnam) (Tajikistan)	Lê Quốc Khánh / Trần Thanh Hoàng; Sergey Makashin / Mansur Yakhyaev	4; 6	6^{6} 7^{8}

=== Sri Lanka vs. Vietnam ===
Sri Lanka
3
Enghelab Sports Complex, Tehran, Iran
13 April 2008
Clay

Vietnam
0

			1	2	3
1	(Sri Lanka) (Vietnam)	Rajeev Rajapakse; Đỗ Minh Quân	6; 3	7; 5
2	(Sri Lanka) (Vietnam)	Harshana Godamanna; Ngô Quang Huy	6; 4	6; 3
3	(Sri Lanka) (Vietnam)	Harshana Godamanna / Rajeev Rajapakse; Lê Quốc Khánh / Trần Thanh Hoàng	6; 1	6; 2

=== United Arab Emirates vs. Tajikistan ===
United Arab Emirates
1
Enghelab Sports Complex, Tehran, Iran
13 April 2008
Clay

Tajikistan
2

			1	2	3
1	(United Arab Emirates) (Tajikistan)	Faisal Bastaki; Sergey Makashin	0; 6	1; 6
2	(United Arab Emirates) (Tajikistan)	Hamad Abbas Janahi; Anvar Rakhmatov	6; 3	6; 2
3	(United Arab Emirates) (Tajikistan)	Faisal Bastaki / Hamad Abbas Janahi; Sergey Makashin / Mansur Yakhyaev	4; 6	0; 6
