= 2005 Davis Cup Asia/Oceania Zone Group III =

International tennis competition

The Group III tournament was held July 13–17, in Victoria Park Tennis Centre, Causeway Bay, Hong Kong, on outdoor hard courts.

== Format ==
The eight teams were split into two groups and played in a round-robin format. The top two teams of each group advanced to the promotion pool, from which the two top teams were promoted to the Asia/Oceania Zone Group II in 2006. The bottom two teams of each group were placed in the relegation pool, from which the two bottom teams were demoted to the Asia/Oceania Zone Group IV in 2006.

== Pool A ==
	Group A	HKG	MAS	KSA	TJK
1	Hong Kong (3–0)		3–0	3–0	3–0
2	Malaysia (2–1)	0–3		2–1	3–0
3	Saudi Arabia (1–2)	0–3	1–2		2–1
4	Tajikistan (0–3)	0–3	0–3	1–2	

=== Hong Kong vs. Saudi Arabia ===
Hong Kong
3
Victoria Park Tennis Centre, Causeway Bay, Hong Kong
13 July 2005
Hard

Saudi Arabia
0

			1	2	3
1	(Hong Kong) (Saudi Arabia)	Martin Sayer; Fahad Al Saad	6; 2	6; 2
2	(Hong Kong) (Saudi Arabia)	Yu Hiu Tung; Omar Althagib	6; 1	6; 0
3	(Hong Kong) (Saudi Arabia)	Brian Hung / Martin Sayer; Fahad Al Saad / Bager Bokhleaf	6; 2	6; 2

=== Tajikistan vs. Malaysia ===
Tajikistan
0
Victoria Park Tennis Centre, Causeway Bay, Hong Kong
13 July 2005
Hard

Malaysia
3

			1	2	3
1	(Tajikistan) (Malaysia)	Mirkhusein Yakhyaev; Selvam Veerasingam	1; 6	0; 6
2	(Tajikistan) (Malaysia)	Dilshod Sharifi; Si Yew Ming	3; 6	5; 7
3	(Tajikistan) (Malaysia)	Dilshod Sharifi / Mirkhusein Yakhyaev; Panthlia-Nikesh Singh / Tan Qi Hao	4; 6	1; 6

=== Hong Kong vs. Malaysia ===
Hong Kong
3
Victoria Park Tennis Centre, Causeway Bay, Hong Kong
14 July 2005
Hard

Malaysia
0

			1	2	3
1	(Hong Kong) (Malaysia)	Wayne Wong; Selvam Veerasingam	6^{5} 7^{7}	6; 3	6; 4
2	(Hong Kong) (Malaysia)	Yu Hiu Tung; Si Yew Ming	3; 6	7^{7} 6^{2}	7; 5
3	(Hong Kong) (Malaysia)	Brian Hung / Martin Sayer; Panthlia-Nikesh Singh / Tan Qi Hao	6; 1	6; 1

=== Tajikistan vs. Saudi Arabia ===
Tajikistan
1
Victoria Park Tennis Centre, Causeway Bay, Hong Kong
14 July 2005
Hard

Saudi Arabia
2

			1	2	3
1	(Tajikistan) (Saudi Arabia)	Mirkhusein Yakhyaev; Fahad Al Saad	2; 6	2; 6
2	(Tajikistan) (Saudi Arabia)	Dilshod Sharifi; Omar Althagib	6; 0	4; 6	6; 3
3	(Tajikistan) (Saudi Arabia)	Dilshod Sharifi / Mansur Yakhyaev; Bader Mohammed Almuqail / Fahad Al Saad	2; 6	4; 6

=== Hong Kong vs. Tajikistan ===
Hong Kong
3
Victoria Park Tennis Centre, Causeway Bay, Hong Kong
15 July 2005
Hard

Tajikistan
0

			1	2	3
1	(Hong Kong) (Tajikistan)	Martin Sayer; Mirkhusein Yakhyaev	6; 0	6; 2
2	(Hong Kong) (Tajikistan)	Brian Hung; Dilshod Sharifi	6; 0	6; 1
3	(Hong Kong) (Tajikistan)	Brian Hung / Martin Sayer; Rahmatullo Rajabaliev / Mirkhusein Yakhyaev	6; 0	6; 1

=== Malaysia vs. Saudi Arabia ===
Malaysia
2
Victoria Park Tennis Centre, Causeway Bay, Hong Kong
15 July 2005
Hard

Saudi Arabia
1

			1	2	3
1	(Malaysia) (Saudi Arabia)	Tan Qi Hao; Fahad Al Saad	4; 6	2; 6
2	(Malaysia) (Saudi Arabia)	Si Yew Ming; Omar Althagib	6; 2	6; 4
3	(Malaysia) (Saudi Arabia)	Si Yew Ming / Selvam Veerasingam; Bader Mohammed Almuqail / Fahad Al Saad	6; 1	6; 3

== Pool B ==
	Group B	VIE	SRI	BRN	QAT
1	Vietnam (3–0)		2–1	2–1	3–0
2	Sri Lanka (2–1)	1–2		3–0	3–0
3	Bahrain (1–2)	1–2	0–3		2–1
4	Qatar (0–3)	0–3	0–3	1–2	

=== Qatar vs. Sri Lanka ===
Qatar
0
Victoria Park Tennis Centre, Causeway Bay, Hong Kong
13 July 2005
Hard

Sri Lanka
3

			1	2	3
1	(Qatar) (Sri Lanka)	Sultan Khalfan Al Alawi; Harshana Godamanna	2; 6	1; 6
2	(Qatar) (Sri Lanka)	Mohammed Abdulla; Renouk Wijemanne	4; 6	0; 6
3	(Qatar) (Sri Lanka)	Mohammed Abdulla / Abdulla Al-Haji; Harshana Godamanna / Oshada Wijemanne	1; 6	1; 6

=== Bahrain vs. Vietnam ===
Bahrain
1
Victoria Park Tennis Centre, Causeway Bay, Hong Kong
13 July 2005
Hard

Vietnam
2

			1	2	3
1	(Bahrain) (Vietnam)	Abdul-Rahman Shehab; Ngô Quang Huy	6; 4	6; 3
2	(Bahrain) (Vietnam)	Abdullatif Mohamed; Đỗ Minh Quân	0; 6	2; 6
3	(Bahrain) (Vietnam)	Abdullatif Mohamed / Abdul-Rahman Shehab; Đỗ Minh Quân / Lê Quốc Khánh	3; 6	2; 6

=== Qatar vs. Vietnam ===
Qatar
0
Victoria Park Tennis Centre, Causeway Bay, Hong Kong
14 July 2005
Hard

Vietnam
3

			1	2	3
1	(Qatar) (Vietnam)	Sultan Khalfan Al Alawi; Ngô Quang Huy	3; 6	6^{5} 7^{7}
2	(Qatar) (Vietnam)	Mohammed Abdulla; Đỗ Minh Quân	1; 6	2; 6
3	(Qatar) (Vietnam)	Mohammed Abdulla / Abdulla Al-Haji; Lê Quốc Khánh / Trần Thanh Hoàng	2; 6	1; 6

=== Bahrain vs. Sri Lanka ===
Bahrain
0
Victoria Park Tennis Centre, Causeway Bay, Hong Kong
14 July 2005
Hard

Sri Lanka
3

			1	2	3
1	(Bahrain) (Sri Lanka)	Abdul-Rahman Shehab; Harshana Godamanna	1; 6	4; 6
2	(Bahrain) (Sri Lanka)	Khaled Al Thawadi; Renouk Wijemanne	2; 6	4; 6
3	(Bahrain) (Sri Lanka)	Abdullatif Mohamed / Abdul-Latif Al Murraghi; Rajeev Rajapakse / Oshada Wijemanne	5; 7	4; 6

=== Qatar vs. Bahrain ===
Qatar
1
Victoria Park Tennis Centre, Causeway Bay, Hong Kong
15 July 2005
Hard

Bahrain
2

			1	2	3
1	(Qatar) (Bahrain)	Sultan Khalfan Al Alawi; Abdul-Rahman Shehab	5; 7	3; 6
2	(Qatar) (Bahrain)	Mohammed Abdulla; Khaled Al Thawadi	6; 2	3; 6	8; 6
3	(Qatar) (Bahrain)	Mohammed Abdulla / Sultan Khalfan Al Alawi; Abdullatif Mohamed / Abdul-Rahman Shehab	4; 6	2; 6

=== Vietnam vs. Sri Lanka ===
Vietnam
2
Victoria Park Tennis Centre, Causeway Bay, Hong Kong
15 July 2005
Hard

Sri Lanka
1

			1	2	3
1	(Vietnam) (Sri Lanka)	Ngô Quang Huy; Harshana Godamanna	6; 4	3; 6	3; 6
2	(Vietnam) (Sri Lanka)	Đỗ Minh Quân; Renouk Wijemanne	6; 4	6; 4
3	(Vietnam) (Sri Lanka)	Đỗ Minh Quân / Lê Quốc Khánh; Harshana Godamanna / Rajeev Rajapakse	6; 3	6; 1

== Promotion pool ==
The top two teams from each of Pools A and B advanced to the Promotion pool. Results and points from games against the opponent from the preliminary round were carried forward.

	1st–4th Play-off	HKG	MAS	VIE	SRI
1	Hong Kong (3–0)		3–0	3–0	3–0
2	Malaysia (2–1)	0–3		3–0	3–0
3	Vietnam (1–2)	0–3	0–3		2–1
4	Sri Lanka (0–3)	0–3	0–3	1–2	

Hong Kong and Malaysia promoted to Group II in 2006.

=== Hong Kong vs. Sri Lanka ===
Hong Kong
3
Victoria Park Tennis Centre, Causeway Bay, Hong Kong
16 July 2005
Hard

Sri Lanka
0

			1	2	3
1	(Hong Kong) (Sri Lanka)	Wayne Wong; Harshana Godamanna	7; 5	6; 2
2	(Hong Kong) (Sri Lanka)	Yu Hiu Tung; Renouk Wijemanne	7; 5	6; 2
3	(Hong Kong) (Sri Lanka)	Brian Hung / Martin Sayer; Harshana Godamanna / Renouk Wijemanne	7; 5	6; 1

=== Vietnam vs. Malaysia ===
Vietnam
0
Victoria Park Tennis Centre, Causeway Bay, Hong Kong
16 July 2005
Hard

Malaysia
3

			1	2	3
1	(Vietnam) (Malaysia)	Ngô Quang Huy; Selvam Veerasingam	4; 6	4; 6
2	(Vietnam) (Malaysia)	Đỗ Minh Quân; Si Yew Ming	7^{11} 6^{9}	4; 6	6; 8
3	(Vietnam) (Malaysia)	Lê Quốc Khánh / Trần Thanh Hoàng; Panthlia-Nikesh Singh / Tan Qi Hao	3; 6	2; 6

=== Hong Kong vs. Vietnam ===
Hong Kong
3
Victoria Park Tennis Centre, Causeway Bay, Hong Kong
17 July 2005
Hard

Vietnam
0

			1	2	3
1	(Hong Kong) (Vietnam)	Martin Sayer; Trần Thanh Hoàng	6; 3	6; 1
2	(Hong Kong) (Vietnam)	Brian Hung; Đỗ Minh Quân	6; 2	6; 4
3	(Hong Kong) (Vietnam)	Martin Sayer / Yu Hiu Tung; Đỗ Minh Quân / Lê Quốc Khánh	6; 1	6; 3

=== Malaysia vs. Sri Lanka ===
Malaysia
3
Victoria Park Tennis Centre, Causeway Bay, Hong Kong
17 July 2005
Hard

Sri Lanka
0

			1	2	3
1	(Malaysia) (Sri Lanka)	Selvam Veerasingam; Harshana Godamanna	3; 6	7^{7} 6^{5}	7; 5
2	(Malaysia) (Sri Lanka)	Si Yew Ming; Renouk Wijemanne	6; 2	6; 1
3	(Malaysia) (Sri Lanka)	Panthlia-Nikesh Singh / Tan Qi Hao; Rajeev Rajapakse / Oshada Wijemanne	6; 3	2; 6	9; 7

== Relegation pool ==
The bottom two teams from Pools A and B were placed in the relegation group. Results and points from games against the opponent from the preliminary round were carried forward.

	5th–8th Play-off	BRN	KSA	QAT	TJK
1	Bahrain (2–1)		2–1	2–1	1–2
2	Saudi Arabia (2–1)	1–2		2–1	2–1
3	Qatar (1–2)	1–2	1–2		2–1
4	Tajikistan (1–2)	2–1	1–2	1–2	

Qatar and Tajikistan relegated to Group IV in 2006.

=== Saudi Arabia vs. Qatar ===
Saudi Arabia
2
Victoria Park Tennis Centre, Causeway Bay, Hong Kong
16 July 2005
Hard

Qatar
1

			1	2	3
1	(Saudi Arabia) (Qatar)	Fahad Al Saad; Sultan Khalfan Al Alawi	6; 2	6; 4
2	(Saudi Arabia) (Qatar)	Omar Althagib; Mohammed Abdulla	0; 6	1; 6
3	(Saudi Arabia) (Qatar)	Bader Mohammed Almuqail / Fahad Al Saad; Mohammed Abdulla / Sultan Khalfan Al Alawi	0; 6	7^{8} 6^{6}	6; 2

=== Bahrain vs. Tajikistan ===
Bahrain
1
Victoria Park Tennis Centre, Causeway Bay, Hong Kong
16 July 2005
Hard

Tajikistan
2

			1	2	3
1	(Bahrain) (Tajikistan)	Abdul-Rahman Shehab; Mansur Yakhyaev	6^{6} 7^{8}	6; 3	6; 4
2	(Bahrain) (Tajikistan)	Khaled Al Thawadi; Dilshod Sharifi	3; 6	3; 6
3	(Bahrain) (Tajikistan)	Abdullatif Mohamed / Abdul-Rahman Shehab; Dilshod Sharifi / Mirkhusein Yakhyaev	4; 6	4; 6

=== Saudi Arabia vs. Bahrain ===
Saudi Arabia
1
Victoria Park Tennis Centre, Causeway Bay, Hong Kong
17 July 2005
Hard

Bahrain
2

			1	2	3
1	(Saudi Arabia) (Bahrain)	Bader Mohammed Almuqail; Abdul-Rahman Shehab	2; 6	1; 0		retired
2	(Saudi Arabia) (Bahrain)	Fahad Al Saad; Khaled Al Thawadi	6; 2	3; 6	6; 3
3	(Saudi Arabia) (Bahrain)	Bader Mohammed Almuqail / Fahad Al Saad; Abdullatif Mohamed / Abdul-Rahman Shehab	5; 7	4; 6

=== Tajikistan vs. Qatar ===
Tajikistan
1
Victoria Park Tennis Centre, Causeway Bay, Hong Kong
17 July 2005
Hard

Qatar
2

			1	2	3
1	(Tajikistan) (Qatar)	Mirkhusein Yakhyaev; Abdulla Al-Haji	6; 4	6; 4
2	(Tajikistan) (Qatar)	Dilshod Sharifi; Mohammed Abdulla	5; 7	6; 3	5; 7
3	(Tajikistan) (Qatar)	Mirkhusein Yakhyaev / Dilshod Sharifi; Mohammed Abdulla / Sultan Khalfan Al Alawi	2; 6	2; 6
