= 2011 Davis Cup Asia/Oceania Zone Group III =

International tennis competition

The Asia/Oceania Zone is one of the three zones of regional Davis Cup competition in 2011.

In the Asia/Oceania Zone there are four different groups in which teams compete against each other to advance to the next group.

== Format ==
The eight teams were split into two groups and played round-robin. The top two teams advanced to the promotion pool where the two top teams will be promoted to the Asia/Oceania Zone Group II for 2012. The last two placed teams from the preliminary round were relegated into the relegation pool and the two bottom teams will be relegated to the Asia/Oceania Zone Group IV for 2012.

It was played on clay on 15–18 June 2011 and the venue was the Sri Lanka Tennis Association, Colombo, Sri Lanka and it was played on outdoor hard.

== Group stage ==
=== Group A ===
| Team | Pld | W | L | MF | MA | Pts |
|---|---|---|---|---|---|---|
| Sri Lanka | 3 | 3 | 0 | 8 | 1 | 3 |
| Vietnam | 3 | 2 | 1 | 4 | 5 | 2 |
| Kuwait | 3 | 1 | 2 | 5 | 4 | 1 |
| Myanmar | 3 | 0 | 3 | 1 | 8 | 0 |

==== Kuwait vs. Myanmar ====
Kuwait
3
Sri Lanka Tennis Association, Colombo, Sri Lanka
15 June 2011
hard (outdoor)

Myanmar
0

| | | | 1 | 2 | 3 |
|---|---|---|---|---|---|
| 1 | (Kuwait) (Myanmar) | Mohammed Ghareeb; Zaw-Zaw Latt | 6; 2 | 6; 2 |
| 2 | (Kuwait) (Myanmar) | Abdullah Maqdas; Phyo Min Thar | 6; 1 | 6; 0 |
| 3 | (Kuwait) (Myanmar) | Mohammed Ghareeb / Abdullah Maqdas; Nge Hnaung / Zaw-Zaw Latt | 6; 1 | 6; 0 |

==== Sri Lanka vs. Vietnam ====
Sri Lanka
3
Sri Lanka Tennis Association, Colombo, Sri Lanka
15 June 2011
hard (outdoor)

Vietnam
0

| | | | 1 | 2 | 3 |
|---|---|---|---|---|---|
| 1 | (Sri Lanka) (Vietnam) | Oshada Wijemanne; Lê Quốc Khánh | 6; 3 | 6; 4 |
| 2 | (Sri Lanka) (Vietnam) | Harshana Godamanna; Thanh-Hoang Tran | 6; 1 | 6; 4 |
| 3 | (Sri Lanka) (Vietnam) | Harshana Godamanna / Rajeev Rajapakse; Lê Quốc Khánh / Ngô Quang Huy | 6; 1 | 6; 7 | 7; 5 |

==== Kuwait vs. Vietnam ====
Kuwait
1
Sri Lanka Tennis Association, Colombo, Sri Lanka
16 June 2011
hard (outdoor)

Vietnam
2

| | | | 1 | 2 | 3 |
|---|---|---|---|---|---|
| 1 | (Kuwait) (Vietnam) | Mohammed Ghareeb; Đỗ Minh Quân | 6; 2 | 3; 6 | 0; 6 |
| 2 | (Kuwait) (Vietnam) | Abdullah Maqdas; Thanh-Hoang Tran | 6; 2 | 7; 6 |
| 3 | (Kuwait) (Vietnam) | Mohammed Ghareeb / Abdullah Maqdas; Lê Quốc Khánh / Ngô Quang Huy | 2; 6 | 6; 7 |

==== Sri Lanka vs. Myanmar ====
Sri Lanka
3
Sri Lanka Tennis Association, Colombo, Sri Lanka
16 June 2011
hard (outdoor)

Myanmar
0

| | | | 1 | 2 | 3 |
|---|---|---|---|---|---|
| 1 | (Sri Lanka) (Myanmar) | Oshada Wijemanne; Phyo Min Thar | 6; 2 | 6; 1 |
| 2 | (Sri Lanka) (Myanmar) | Harshana Godamanna; Nge Hnaung | 6; 4 | 6; 2 |
| 3 | (Sri Lanka) (Myanmar) | Harshana Godamanna / Rajeev Rajapakse; Zaw-Zaw Latt / Phyo Min Thar | 6; 4 | 6; 3 |

==== Sri Lanka vs. Kuwait ====
Sri Lanka
2
Sri Lanka Tennis Association, Colombo, Sri Lanka
17 June 2011
hard (outdoor)

Kuwait
1

| | | | 1 | 2 | 3 |
|---|---|---|---|---|---|---|
| 1 | (Sri Lanka) (Kuwait) | Oshada Wijemanne; Mohammed Ghareeb | 5; 7 | 4; 6 |
| 2 | (Sri Lanka) (Kuwait) | Harshana Godamanna; Abdullah Maqdas | 5; 4 | | | retired |
| 3 | (Sri Lanka) (Kuwait) | Harshana Godamanna / Rajeev Rajapakse; Abdulrahman Alawadhi / Mohammed Ghareeb | 6; 3 | 6; 1 |

==== Vietnam vs. Myanmar ====
Vietnam
2
Sri Lanka Tennis Association, Colombo, Sri Lanka
17 June 2011
hard (outdoor)

Myanmar
1

| | | | 1 | 2 | 3 |
|---|---|---|---|---|---|
| 1 | (Vietnam) (Myanmar) | Đỗ Minh Quân; Zaw-Zaw Latt | 6; 0 | 6; 2 |
| 2 | (Vietnam) (Myanmar) | Thanh-Hoang Tran; Nge Hnaung | 4; 6 | 2; 6 |
| 3 | (Vietnam) (Myanmar) | Đỗ Minh Quân / Lê Quốc Khánh; Zaw-Zaw Latt / Phyo Min Thar | 6; 1 | 6; 0 |

=== Group B ===
| Team | Pld | W | L | MF | MA | Pts |
|---|---|---|---|---|---|---|
| Lebanon | 3 | 3 | 0 | 7 | 2 | 3 |
| Malaysia | 3 | 2 | 1 | 4 | 5 | 2 |
| Oman | 3 | 1 | 2 | 4 | 5 | 1 |
| United Arab Emirates | 3 | 0 | 3 | 3 | 6 | 0 |

==== Malaysia vs. United Arab Emirates ====
Malaysia
2
Sri Lanka Tennis Association, Colombo, Sri Lanka
15 June 2011
hard (outdoor)

United Arab Emirates
1

| | | | 1 | 2 | 3 |
|---|---|---|---|---|---|
| 1 | (Malaysia) (United Arab Emirates) | Si Yew Ming; Hamad Abbas Janahi | 3; 6 | 6; 2 | 6; 3 |
| 2 | (Malaysia) (United Arab Emirates) | Ariez Elyaas Deen Heshaam; Omar Awadhy | 3; 6 | 7; 6 | 2; 6 |
| 3 | (Malaysia) (United Arab Emirates) | Ahmed Deedat Abdul Razak / Mohamed Nazim Khan; Omar Awadhy / Hamad Abbas Janahi | 6; 2 | 6; 2 |

==== Oman vs. Lebanon ====
Oman
1
Sri Lanka Tennis Association, Colombo, Sri Lanka
15 June 2011
hard (outdoor)

Lebanon
2

| | | | 1 | 2 | 3 |
|---|---|---|---|---|---|---|
| 1 | (Oman) (Lebanon) | Mohammed Al-Nabhani; Karim Alayli | 1; 6 | 5; 7 |
| 2 | (Oman) (Lebanon) | Khalid Al-Nabhani; Bassam Beidas | 2; 6 | 1; 6 |
| 3 | (Oman) (Lebanon) | Khalid Al-Nabhani / Mohammed Al-Nabhani; Bassam Beidas / Patrick Chucri | 6; 7 | 1; 2 | | retired |

==== Malaysia vs. Oman ====
Malaysia
2
Sri Lanka Tennis Association, Colombo, Sri Lanka
16 June 2011
hard (outdoor)

Oman
1

| | | | 1 | 2 | 3 |
|---|---|---|---|---|---|---|
| 1 | (Malaysia) (Oman) | Mohamed Nazim Khan; Mohammed Al-Nabhani | 1; 6 | | | retired |
| 2 | (Malaysia) (Oman) | Ariez Elyaas Deen Heshaam; Khalid Al-Nabhani | 6; 4 | 6; 4 |
| 3 | (Malaysia) (Oman) | Ahmed Deedat Abdul Razak / Si Yew Ming; Khalid Al-Nabhani / Mohammed Al-Nabhani | 3; 6 | 6; 3 | 6; 2 |

==== Lebanon vs. United Arab Emirates ====
Lebanon
2
Sri Lanka Tennis Association, Colombo, Sri Lanka
16 June 2011
hard (outdoor)

United Arab Emirates
1

| | | | 1 | 2 | 3 |
|---|---|---|---|---|---|---|
| 1 | (Lebanon) (United Arab Emirates) | Karim Alayli; Faisal Bastaki | 6; 1 | 6; 1 |
| 2 | (Lebanon) (United Arab Emirates) | Bassam Beidas; Khaled Al-Hassani | 6; 2 | 6; 0 |
| 3 | (Lebanon) (United Arab Emirates) | Bassam Beidas / Giovani Samaha; Khaled Al-Hassani / Faisal Bastaki | 3; 4 | | | retired |

==== Malaysia vs. Lebanon ====
Malaysia
0
Sri Lanka Tennis Association, Colombo, Sri Lanka
17 June 2011
hard (outdoor)

Lebanon
3

| | | | 1 | 2 | 3 |
|---|---|---|---|---|---|---|
| 1 | (Malaysia) (Lebanon) | Ahmed Deedat Abdul Razak; Karim Alayli | 2; 6 | 2; 6 |
| 2 | (Malaysia) (Lebanon) | Ariez Elyaas Deen Heshaam; Bassam Beidas | 1; 6 | 5; 7 |
| 3 | (Malaysia) (Lebanon) | Ariez Elyaas Deen Heshaam / Si Yew Ming; Bassam Beidas / Patrick Chucri | 6; 3 | 1; 6 | 1; 4 | retired |

==== Oman vs. United Arab Emirates ====
Oman
2
Sri Lanka Tennis Association, Colombo, Sri Lanka
17 June 2011
hard (outdoor)

United Arab Emirates
1

| | | | 1 | 2 | 3 |
|---|---|---|---|---|---|
| 1 | (Oman) (United Arab Emirates) | Mohammed Al-Nabhani; Hamad Abbas Janahi | 6; 2 | 6; 2 |
| 2 | (Oman) (United Arab Emirates) | Khalid Al-Nabhani; Omar Awadhy | 3; 6 | 3; 6 |
| 3 | (Oman) (United Arab Emirates) | Khalid Al-Nabhani / Mohammed Al-Nabhani; Omar Awadhy / Hamad Abbas Janahi | 7; 6 | 2; 6 | 7; 6 |

== Promotion pool ==
Results and points from games against the opponent from the preliminary round were carried forward.

| Team | Pld | W | L | MF | MA | Pts |
|---|---|---|---|---|---|---|
| Sri Lanka | 3 | 3 | 0 | 8 | 1 | 3 |
| Lebanon | 3 | 2 | 1 | 6 | 3 | 2 |
| Vietnam | 3 | 1 | 2 | 2 | 7 | 1 |
| Malaysia | 3 | 0 | 3 | 2 | 7 | 0 |

=== Sri Lanka vs. Malaysia ===
Sri Lanka
2
Sri Lanka Tennis Association, Colombo, Sri Lanka
18 June 2011
hard (outdoor)

Malaysia
1

| | | | 1 | 2 | 3 |
|---|---|---|---|---|---|
| 1 | (Sri Lanka) (Malaysia) | Oshada Wijemanne; Si Yew Ming | 6; 4 | 7; 5 |
| 2 | (Sri Lanka) (Malaysia) | Harshana Godamanna; Ariez Elyaas Deen Heshaam | 6; 1 | 6; 2 |
| 3 | (Sri Lanka) (Malaysia) | Rajeev Rajapakse / Dineshkanthan Thangarajah; Ahmed Deedat Abdul Razak / Si Yew Ming | 4; 6 | 2; 6 |

=== Vietnam vs. Lebanon ===
Vietnam
0
Sri Lanka Tennis Association, Colombo, Sri Lanka
18 June 2011
hard (outdoor)

Lebanon
3

| | | | 1 | 2 | 3 |
|---|---|---|---|---|---|---|
| 1 | (Vietnam) (Lebanon) | Lê Quốc Khánh; Karim Alayli | 3; 6 | 2; 6 |
| 2 | (Vietnam) (Lebanon) | Đỗ Minh Quân; Bassam Beidas | 0; 6 | 2; 6 |
| 3 | (Vietnam) (Lebanon) | Lê Quốc Khánh / Ngô Quang Huy; Patrick Chucri / Giovani Samaha | 5; 4 | | | retired |

=== Sri Lanka vs. Lebanon ===
Sri Lanka
3
Sri Lanka Tennis Association, Colombo, Sri Lanka
19 June 2011
hard (outdoor)

Lebanon
0

| | | | 1 | 2 | 3 |
|---|---|---|---|---|---|---|
| 1 | (Sri Lanka) (Lebanon) | Oshada Wijemanne; Karim Alayli | 5; 2 | | | retired |
| 2 | (Sri Lanka) (Lebanon) | Harshana Godamanna; Giovani Samaha | 6; 2 | 6; 1 |
| 3 | (Sri Lanka) (Lebanon) | Rajeev Rajapakse / Oshada Wijemanne; Patrick Chucri / Giovani Samaha | 1; 0 | | | retired |

=== Vietnam vs. Malaysia ===
Vietnam
2
Sri Lanka Tennis Association, Colombo, Sri Lanka
19 June 2011
hard (outdoor)

Malaysia
1

| | | | 1 | 2 | 3 |
|---|---|---|---|---|---|
| 1 | (Vietnam) (Malaysia) | Lê Quốc Khánh; Si Yew Ming | 3; 6 | 3; 6 |
| 2 | (Vietnam) (Malaysia) | Thanh-Hoang Tran; Ariez Elyaas Deen Heshaam | 2; 6 | 6; 3 | 6; 0 |
| 3 | (Vietnam) (Malaysia) | Đỗ Minh Quân / Ngô Quang Huy; Ahmed Deedat Abdul Razak / Mohamed Nazim Khan | 6; 0 | 7; 6 |

== Relegation pool ==
Results and points from games against the opponent from the preliminary round were carried forward.

| Team | Pld | W | L | MF | MA | Pts |
|---|---|---|---|---|---|---|
| Kuwait | 3 | 3 | 0 | 9 | 0 | 3 |
| Oman | 3 | 2 | 1 | 4 | 5 | 2 |
| United Arab Emirates | 3 | 1 | 2 | 3 | 6 | 1 |
| Myanmar | 3 | 0 | 3 | 2 | 7 | 0 |

=== Kuwait vs. United Arab Emirates ===
Kuwait
3
Sri Lanka Tennis Association, Colombo, Sri Lanka
18 June 2011
hard (outdoor)

United Arab Emirates
0

| | | | 1 | 2 | 3 |
|---|---|---|---|---|---|
| 1 | (Kuwait) (United Arab Emirates) | Mohammed Ghareeb; Hamad Abbas Janahi | 6; 4 | 2; 6 | 6; 2 |
| 2 | (Kuwait) (United Arab Emirates) | Abdullah Maqdas; Omar Awadhy | 6; 1 | 7; 6 |
| 3 | (Kuwait) (United Arab Emirates) | Abdulrahman Alawadhi / Ali Ghareeb; Omar Awadhy / Hamad Abbas Janahi | 6; 4 | 6; 1 |

=== Myanmar vs. Oman ===
Myanmar
1
Sri Lanka Tennis Association, Colombo, Sri Lanka
18 June 2011
hard (outdoor)

Oman
2

| | | | 1 | 2 | 3 |
|---|---|---|---|---|---|
| 1 | (Myanmar) (Oman) | Phyo Min Thar; Mohammed Al-Nabhani | 4; 6 | 3; 6 |
| 2 | (Myanmar) (Oman) | Nge Hnaung; Khalid Al-Nabhani | 3; 6 | 3; 6 |
| 3 | (Myanmar) (Oman) | Zaw-Zaw Latt / Phyo Min Thar; Khalid Al-Nabhani / Mohammed Al-Nabhani | 6; 0 | 6; 0 |

=== Kuwait vs. Oman ===
Kuwait
3
Sri Lanka Tennis Association, Colombo, Sri Lanka
19 June 2011
hard (outdoor)

Oman
0

| | | | 1 | 2 | 3 |
|---|---|---|---|---|---|
| 1 | (Kuwait) (Oman) | Abdulrahman Alawadhi; Khalid Hamdi Al-Barwani | 6; 1 | 6; 1 |
| 2 | (Kuwait) (Oman) | Ali Ghareeb; Abdulmalik Alawfi | 6; 2 | 6; 1 |
| 3 | (Kuwait) (Oman) | Abdulrahman Alawadhi / Ali Ghareeb; Abdulmalik Alawfi / Khalid Hamdi Al-Barwani | 6; 0 | 6; 1 |

=== Myanmar vs. United Arab Emirates ===
Myanmar
1
Sri Lanka Tennis Association, Colombo, Sri Lanka
19 June 2011
hard (outdoor)

United Arab Emirates
2

| | | | 1 | 2 | 3 |
|---|---|---|---|---|---|
| 1 | (Myanmar) (United Arab Emirates) | Aung Kyaw Naing; Hamad Abbas Janahi | 2; 6 | 0; 6 |
| 2 | (Myanmar) (United Arab Emirates) | Phyo Min Thar; Omar Awadhy | 3; 6 | 6; 3 | 3; 6 |
| 3 | (Myanmar) (United Arab Emirates) | Nge Hnaung / Zaw-Zaw Latt; Mahmoud-Khalifa Al Balushi / Khaled Al Hassani | 6; 0 | 6; 0 |

== Final standings ==
| Rank | Team |
|---|---|
| 1 | Sri Lanka |
| 2 | Lebanon |
| 3 | Vietnam |
| 4 | Malaysia |
| 5 | Kuwait |
| 6 | Oman |
| 7 | United Arab Emirates |
| 8 | Myanmar |

- Sri Lanka and Lebanon promoted to Group II in 2012.
- United Arab Emirates and Myanmar relegated to Group IV in 2012.
