= Tennis at the 2003 SEA Games =

The tennis tournament at the 2003 SEA Games was held from December 5 to December 12 in Lan Anh Gymnasium, Ho Chi Minh City, Vietnam.

== Medalists ==
Event	Gold	Silver	Bronze
Men's singles	(Thailand) Danai Udomchoke	(Indonesia) Febi Widhiyanto	(Thailand) Attapol Rithiwattanapong
Men's singles	(Thailand) Danai Udomchoke	(Indonesia) Febi Widhiyanto	(Indonesia) Prima Simpatiaji
Women's singles	(Thailand) Suchanun Viratprasert	(Thailand) Napaporn Tongsalee	(Indonesia) Septi Mende
Women's singles	(Thailand) Suchanun Viratprasert	(Thailand) Napaporn Tongsalee	(Indonesia) Sandy Gumulya
Men's doubles	(Thailand) Sanchai Ratiwatana and Sonchat Ratiwatana	(Indonesia) Hendri Susilo Pramono and Suwandi	(Vietnam) Do Minh Quan and Le Quoc Khanh
Men's doubles	(Thailand) Sanchai Ratiwatana and Sonchat Ratiwatana	(Indonesia) Hendri Susilo Pramono and Suwandi	(Indonesia) Prima Simpatiaji and Febi Widhiyanto
Women's doubles	(Indonesia) Wynne Prakusya and Maya Rosa	(Thailand) Napaporn Tongsalee and Suchanun Viratprasert	(Indonesia) Sandy Gumulya and Septi Mende
Women's doubles	(Indonesia) Wynne Prakusya and Maya Rosa	(Thailand) Napaporn Tongsalee and Suchanun Viratprasert	(Thailand) Wilawan Choptang and Chattida Thimjapo
Mixed doubles	(Indonesia) Suwandi and Wynne Prakusya	(Indonesia) Hendri Susilo Pramono and Maya Rosa	(Malaysia) Si Yew Ming and Khoo Chin-bee
Mixed doubles	(Indonesia) Suwandi and Wynne Prakusya	(Indonesia) Hendri Susilo Pramono and Maya Rosa	(Thailand) Sonchat Ratiwatana and Chattida Thimjapo
Men's teams	Indonesia (INA); Prima Simpatiaji; Hendri Susilo Pramono; Suwandi; Febi Widhiyanto	Thailand (THA); Sanchai Ratiwatana; Sonchat Ratiwatana; Attapol Rithiwattanapong; Danai Udomchoke	Vietnam (VIE); Do Minh Quan; Huynh Chi Khuong; Le Quoc Khanh; Ngô Quang Huy
Men's teams	Indonesia (INA); Prima Simpatiaji; Hendri Susilo Pramono; Suwandi; Febi Widhiyanto	Thailand (THA); Sanchai Ratiwatana; Sonchat Ratiwatana; Attapol Rithiwattanapong; Danai Udomchoke	Malaysia (MAS); Mohd Noor Nordin; Si Yew Ming; Dannio Yahya
Women's team	Thailand (THA); Wilawan Choptang; Chattida Thimjapo; Napaporn Tongsalee; Suchanun Viratprasert	Indonesia (INA); Sandy Gumulya; Septi Mende; Wynne Prakusya; Maya Rosa	Philippines (PHI); Czarina Mae Arevalo; Alyssa Anne Labay; Anna Patricia Santos
Women's team	Thailand (THA); Wilawan Choptang; Chattida Thimjapo; Napaporn Tongsalee; Suchanun Viratprasert	Indonesia (INA); Sandy Gumulya; Septi Mende; Wynne Prakusya; Maya Rosa	Vietnam (VIE); Huynh Mai Huynh; Nguyen Thuy Dung; Phan Nhu Quynh; Tran Kim Loi

== Results ==
=== Men's team ===
**Quarter-final**; **5 December**
**Thailand (THA)**	**3**
Timor-Leste (TLS)	0
**Vietnam (VIE)**	**3**
Myanmar (MYA)	0
Laos (LAO)	0
**Malaysia (MAS)**	**3**
Philippines (PHI)	0
**Indonesia (INA)**	**3**

**Semi-Final**; **6 December**
**Thailand (THA)**	**3**
Vietnam (VIE)	0
Malaysia (MAS)	0
**Indonesia (INA)**	**3**

**Final**; **7 December**
Thailand (THA)	1
**Indonesia (INA)**	**2**

==== Quarter-final ====
5 December	**Thailand (THA)**	**3–0**	**Timor-Leste (TLS)**

Attapol Rithiwattanapong	**2–0**	Jaimito Da Costa	6-0, 6-1
Danai Udomchoke	**2–0**	Matias De Sousa	6-0, 6-1
Sanchai Ratiwatana / Sonchat Ratiwatana	**2–0**	Jaimito Da Costa / Matias De Sousa	6-0, 6-0

5 December	**Vietnam (VIE)**	**3–0**	**Myanmar (MYA)**

Le Quoc Khanh	**2–0**	Tu Maw	6-0, 6-3
Do Minh Quan	**2–0**	Latt Zaw Zaw	6-2, 6-2
Huynh Chi Khuong / Ngô Quang Huy		Min Min / Khin Maung Win

5 December	**Laos (LAO)**	**0–3**	**Malaysia (MAS)**

Eakalath Phonepraseuth	**0–2**	Dannio Yahya	1-6, 4-6
Vivongsay Vongsouthi	**0–2**	Si Yew Ming	3-6, 4-6
Vongsavath Chansomphou / Somchay Pathinathak	**0–2**	Mohd Noor Nordin / Dannio Yahya	1-6, 0-6

5 December	**Philippines (PHI)**	**0–3**	**Indonesia (INA)**

Joseph Victorina	**0–2**	Prima Simpatiaji	2-6, 2-6
Johnny Arcilla	**1–2**	Febi Widhiyanto	2-6, 6-3, 3-6
Adelo Abadia / Rolando Ruel Jr.	**0–2**	Hendri Susilo Pramono / Suwandi	2-6, 5-7

==== Semi-final ====
6 December	**Thailand (THA)**	**3–0**	**Vietnam (VIE)**

Attapol Rithiwattanapong	Le Quoc Khanh
Danai Udomchoke	Do Minh Quan
Sanchai Ratiwatana / Sonchat Ratiwatana	Huynh Chi Khuong / Ngô Quang Huy

6 December	**Malaysia (MAS)**	**0–3**	**Indonesia (INA)**

Danio Yahya	**0–2**	Prima Simpatiaji	1-6, 3-6
Si Yew Ming	**1–2**	Febi Widhiyanto	3-6, 6-3, 6-4
Mohd Noor Nordin / Dannio Yahya	**1–2**	Hendri Susilo Pramono / Suwandi	2-6, 6-3, 3-6

==== Final ====
7 December	**Thailand (THA)**	**1–2**	**Indonesia (INA)**

Attapol Rithiwattanapong	**0–2**	Prima Simpatiaji	6-7(5), 1-6
Danai Udomchoke	**2–1**	Febi Widhiyanto	3-6, 6-4, 6-3
Sonchat Ratiwatana / Sanchai Ratiwatana	**0–2**	Hendri Susilo Pramono / Suwandi	4-6, 6-7(6)

=== Women's team ===
**Quarter-final**; **5 December**
Myanmar (MYA)	0
**Philippines (PHI)**	**3**

**Semi-Final**; **6 December**
**Thailand (THA)**	**3**
Vietnam (VIE)	0
Philippines (PHI)	1
**Indonesia (INA)**	**2**

**Final**; **7 December**
**Thailand (THA)**	**2**
Indonesia (INA)

==== Quarter-final ====
5 December	**Myanmar (MYA)**	**0–3**	**Philippines (PHI)**

Kyi Mya Zaw	**0–2**	Anna Patricia Santos	1-6, 1-6
Amy Tun	**0–2**	Czarina Mae Arevalo	1-6, 0-6
Amy Tun / Chit Su Yee		Czarina Mae Arevalo / Anna Patricia Santos

==== Semi-final ====
6 December	**Thailand (THA)**	**3–0**	**Vietnam (VIE)**

Napaporn Tongsalee	Nguye Thuy Dung
Suchanun Viratprasert	Tran Kim Loi
Wilawan Choptang / Chattida Thimjapo	Huynh Mai Huynh / Nguyen Thuy Dung

6 December	**Philippines (PHI)**	**1–2**	**Indonesia (INA)**

Anna Patricia Santos	**0–2**	Septi Mende	4-6, 2-6
Czarina Mae Arevalo	**2–1**	Sandy Gumulya	7-6(5), 4-6, 7-6(7)
Czarina Mae Arevalo / Anna Patricia Santos	**0–2**	Wynne Prakusya / Maya Rosa	5-7, 2-6

==== Final ====
7 December	**Thailand (THA)**	**2–1**	**Indonesia (INA)**

Napaporn Tongsalee	**0–2**	Sandy Gumulya	4-6, 1-6
Suchanun Viratprasert	**2–0**	Wynne Prakusya	6-4, 6-2
Suchanun Viratprasert / Napaporn Tongsalee	**2–1**	Wynne Prakusya / Maya Rosa	6-4, 2-6, 6-1

=== Men's singles ===
**1st round** **8 December**
**Danai Udomchoke (THA)**	**2**
Vongsouthi Vivongsay (LAO)	0
Jaimito Da Costa (TLS)	0
**Tu Maw (MYA)**	**2**
**Prima Simpatiaji (INA)**	**6**	**7^{7}**
Joseph Victorino (PHI)	1	6^{2}
Dannio Yahya (MAS)	**6**	6	1
**Do Minh Quan (VIE)**	2	**7**	**6**
**Attapol Rithiwattanapong (THA)**	**2**
Ngô Quang Huy (VIE)	0
Matias De Sousa (TLS)	0	0
**Si Yew Ming (MAS)**	**6**	**6**
Min Min (MYA)	0
**Johnny Arcilla (PHI)**	**2**
Chansomphou Vongsavath (LAO)	0	1
**Febi Widhiyanto (INA)**	**6**	**6**

**Quarterfinals**; **9 December**
**Danai Udomchoke (THA)**	**2**
Tu Maw (MYA)	0
**Prima Simpatiaji (INA)**	**6**	**6**
Do Minh Quan (VIE)	4	4
**Attapol Rithiwattanapong (THA)**	0	**7**	**7**
Si Yew Ming (MAS)	**6**	6	5
Johnny Arcilla (PHI)	2	**6**	6^{4}
**Febi Widhiyanto (INA)**	**6**	1	**7^{7}**

**Semifinals**; **10 December**
**Danai Udomchoke (THA)**	**6**	**6**
Prima Simpatiaji (INA)	3	1
Attapol Rithiwattanapong (THA)	**6**	6^{0}(r)
**Febi Widhiyanto (INA)**	4	**6^{4}**

**Final**; **12 December**
**Danai Udomchoke (THA)**	**6**	**6**
Febi Widhiyanto (INA)	0	1

=== Women's singles ===
**1st round** **8 December**
Chit Su Yee (MYA)	0
**Czarina Mae Arevalo (PHI)**	**2**
**Septi Mende (INA)**	**6**	**6**
Anna Patricia Santos (VIE)	0	3
**Tran Kim Loi (VIE)**	**2**
Kyi Mya Zaw (MYA)	0

**Quarterfinals**; **9 December**
**Suchanun Viratprasert (THA)**	**6**	**6**
Nguyen Thuy Dung (VIE)	0	0
**Sandy Gumulya (INA)**	**6**
Czarina Mae Arevalo (PHI)	3	(r)
**Septi Mende (INA)**	3	**6**	**7^{7}**
Khoo Chin-bee (MAS)	**6**	4	6^{4}
Tran Kim Loi (VIE)	1	0
**Napaporn Tongsalee (THA)**	**6**	**6**

**Semifinals**; **10 December**
**Suchanun Viratprasert (THA)**	**7^{9}**	**6**
Sandy Gumulya (INA)	6^{7}	2
Septi Mende (INA)	2	**6**	0
**Napaporn Tongsalee (THA)**	**6**	4	**6**

**Final**; **12 December**
**Suchanun Viratprasert (THA)**	**6**	**6**
Napaporn Tongsalee (THA)	2	4

=== Men's doubles ===
**1st round** **8 December**
**Huynh Chi Khuong (VIE)**; **Ngô Quang Huy (VIE)**	**2**
Min Min (MYA); Khin Maung Win (MYA)	0
Phonepraseuth Eakalath (LAO); Vongsouthi Vivongsay (LAO)
**Adelo Abadia (PHI)**; **Johnny Arcilla (PHI)**	**2**
**Tu Maw (MYA)**; **Zaw Zaw Latt (MYA)**	**2**
Jaimito Da Costa (TLS); Matias De Sousa (TLS)	0
Mohd Noor Nordin (MAS); Dannio Yahya (MAS)	2	2
**Do Minh Quan (VIE)**; **Le Quoc Khanh (VIE)**	**6**	**6**
Chansomphou Vongsavath (LAO); Somchay Phathithak (LAO)	0
**Rolando Ruel Jr. (PHI)**; **Joseph Victorino (PHI)**	**2**

**Quarterfinals**; **9 December**
**Sanchai Ratiwatana (THA)**; **Sonchat Ratiwatana (THA)**	**6**	**6**
Huynh Chi Khuong (VIE); Ngô Quang Huy (VIE)	3	3
**Prima Simpatiaji (INA)**; **Febi Widhiyanto (INA)**	**7^{7}**	**6**
Adelo Abadia (PHI); Johnny Arcilla (PHI)	6^{2}	4
Tu Maw (MYA); Zaw Zaw Latt (MYA)	0
**Do Minh Quan (VIE)**; **Le Quoc Khanh (VIE)**	**2**
Rolando Ruel Jr. (PHI); Joseph Victorino (PHI)	2	1
**Hendri Susilo Pramono (INA)**; **Suwandi (INA)**	**6**	**6**

**Semifinals**; **10 December**
**Sanchai Ratiwatana (THA)**; **Sonchat Ratiwatana (THA)**	**6**	4	**6**
Prima Simpatiaji (INA); Febi Widhiyanto (INA)	1	**6**	3
Do Minh Quan (VIE); Le Quoc Khanh (VIE)	4	3
**Hendri Susilo Pramono (INA)**; **Suwandi (INA)**	**6**	**6**

**Final**; **11 December**
**Sanchai Ratiwatana (THA)**; **Sonchat Ratiwatana (THA)**	**6**	**7^{7}**
Hendri Susilo Pramono (INA); Suwandi (INA)	1	6^{5}

=== Women's doubles ===
**Quarterfinals**; **8 December**
**Wynne Prakusya (INA)**; **Maya Rosa (INA)**	**6**	**6**
Tran Kim Loi (VIE); Phan Nhu Quynh (VIE)	1	2
**Wilawan Choptang (THA)**; **Chattida Thimjapo (THA)**	**2**
Czarina Mae Arevalo (PHI); Anna Patricia Santos (PHI)	1
Huynh Mai Huynh (VIE); Nguyen Thuy Dung (VIE)	3	2
**Sandy Gumulya (INA)**; **Septi Mende (INA)**	**6**	**6**
Amy Tun (MYA); Kyi Mya Zaw (MYA)	0
**Napaporn Tongsalee (THA)**; **Suchanun Viratprasert (THA)**	**2**

**Semifinals**; **9 December**
**Wynne Prakusya (INA)**; **Maya Rosa (INA)**	**6**	5	**6**
Wilawan Choptang (THA); Chattida Thimjapo (THA)	3	**7**	2
Sandy Gumulya (INA); Septi Mende (INA)	**6**	1	6^{3}
**Napaporn Tongsalee (THA)**; **Suchanun Viratprasert (THA)**	3	**6**	**7^{7}**

**Final**; **11 December**
**Wynne Prakusya (INA)**; **Maya Rosa (INA)**	**6**	4	**6**
Napaporn Tongsalee (THA); Suchanun Viratprasert (THA)	4	**6**	1

=== Mixed doubles ===
**1st round** **7 December**
Rolando Ruel Jr. (PHI); Alyssa Anne Labay (PHI)	1
**Zaw Zaw Latt (MYA)**; **Amy Tun (MYA)**	**2**
Khin Maung Win (MYA); Chit Su Yee (MYA)	0
**Huynh Chi Khuong (VIE)**; **Phan Nhu Quynh (VIE)**	**2**

**Quarterfinals**; **8 December**
1	**Suwandi (INA)**; **Wynne Prakusya (INA)**	**6**	**6**
Le Quoc Khanh (VIE); Huynh Mai Huynh (VIE)	2	1
3	**Sonchat Ratiwatana (THA)**; **Chattida Thimjapo (THA)**	**2**
Zaw Zaw Latt (MYA); Amy Tun (MYA)	0
Huynh Chi Khuong (VIE); Phan Nhu Quynh (VIE)	**6**	3	4
4	**Si Yew Ming (MAS)**; **Khoo Chin-bee (MAS)**	1	**6**	**6**
Hendri Susilo Pramono (INA); Maya Rosa (INA)	**6**	**6**
2	**Sanchai Ratiwatana (THA)**; **Wilawan Choptang (THA)**	4	4

**Semifinals**; **9 December**
1	**Suwandi (INA)**; **Wynne Prakusya (INA)**	**6**	**6**
3	Sonchat Ratiwatana (THA); Chattida Thimjapo (THA)	3	1
4	Si Yew Ming (MAS); Khoo Chin-bee (MAS)	**6**	2	3
**Hendri Susilo Pramono (INA)**; **Maya Rosa (INA)**	1	**6**	**6**

**Final**; **11 December**
1	**Suwandi (INA)**; **Wynne Prakusya (INA)**	**7**	**6**
Hendri Susilo Pramono (INA); Maya Rosa (INA)	5	2

=== Medal table ===
(Host nation in bold.)

Rank	Nation	Gold	Silver	Bronze	Total
1	Thailand	4	3	3	10
2	Indonesia	3	4	5	12
3	Vietnam	0	0	3	3
4	Malaysia	0	0	2	2
5	Philippines	0	0	1	1
Totals (5 entries)		7	7	14	28

Preceded by 2001	Tennis at the SEA Games; 2003 SEA Games	Succeeded by 2005
