= Tennis at the 2001 SEA Games =

- Venue: Jalan Duta Tennis Complex, Kuala Lumpur
- Dates: 9–15 September 2001

Tennis at the 2001 SEA Games was held in Jalan Duta Tennis Complex, Kuala Lumpur, Malaysia from 9 to 16 September 2001 Tennis had team, doubles, and singles events for men and women, as well as a mixed doubles competition.

== Medalists ==
Event	Gold	Silver	Bronze
Men's team	Indonesia (INA); Suwandi; Peter Handoyo; Bonit Wiryawan; Sulistyo Wibowo	Thailand (THA); Danai Udomchoke; Vittaya Samrej; Pracharapol Khamsaman; Attapol Rithiwattanapong	Myanmar (MYA); Maung Zaw Zaw Latt; Khin Maung Win; M Tu Tu Ja; Maung Tu Maw
Men's team	Indonesia (INA); Suwandi; Peter Handoyo; Bonit Wiryawan; Sulistyo Wibowo	Thailand (THA); Danai Udomchoke; Vittaya Samrej; Pracharapol Khamsaman; Attapol Rithiwattanapong	Philippines (PHI); Johnny Arcilla; Joseph Victorino; Michael Mora III; Joseph Lizardo
Women's team	Indonesia (INA); Wynne Prakusya; Romana Tedjakusuma; Yayuk Basuki; Angelique Widjaja	Malaysia (MAS); Khoo Chin-bee; Tan Lynn Yin; Liaw Chen Yee	Thailand (THA); Suchanun Viratprasert; Napaporn Tongsalee; Orawan Lamanthong; Chattida Thimjapo
Women's team	Indonesia (INA); Wynne Prakusya; Romana Tedjakusuma; Yayuk Basuki; Angelique Widjaja	Malaysia (MAS); Khoo Chin-bee; Tan Lynn Yin; Liaw Chen Yee	Philippines (PHI); Czarina Mae Arevalo; Jennifer Saret; Kara Guzman
Men's singles	Danai Udomchoke; Thailand	Suwandi; Indonesia	V. Selvam; Malaysia
Men's singles	Danai Udomchoke; Thailand	Suwandi; Indonesia	Peter Handoyo; Indonesia
Women's singles	Romana Tedjakusuma; Indonesia	Wynne Prakusya; Indonesia	Khoo Chin-bee; Malaysia
Women's singles	Romana Tedjakusuma; Indonesia	Wynne Prakusya; Indonesia	Suchanun Viratprasert; Thailand
Men's doubles	Thailand (THA); Vittaya Samrej; Danai Udomchoke	Indonesia (INA); Sulistyo Wibowo; Bonit Wiryawan	Malaysia (MAS); Adam Jaya; Mohd Nazreen Fuzi
Men's doubles	Thailand (THA); Vittaya Samrej; Danai Udomchoke	Indonesia (INA); Sulistyo Wibowo; Bonit Wiryawan	Thailand (THA); Pracharapol Khamsaman; Attapol Rithiwattanapong
Women's doubles	Indonesia (INA); Yayuk Basuki; Wynne Prakusya	Indonesia (INA); Romana Tedjakusuma; Angelique Widjaja	Thailand (THA); Orawan Lamanthong; Chattida Thimjapo
Women's doubles	Indonesia (INA); Yayuk Basuki; Wynne Prakusya	Indonesia (INA); Romana Tedjakusuma; Angelique Widjaja	Thailand (THA); Napaporn Tongsalee; Suchanun Viratprasert
Mixed doubles	Indonesia (INA); Bonit Wiryawan; Angelique Widjaja	Indonesia (INA); Suwandi; Yayuk Basuki	Thailand (THA); Vittaya Samrej; Chattida Thimjapo
Mixed doubles	Indonesia (INA); Bonit Wiryawan; Angelique Widjaja	Indonesia (INA); Suwandi; Yayuk Basuki	Malaysia (MAS); V. Selvam; Khoo Chin-bee

== Results ==
=== Men's team ===
1st Round
Philippines (PHI)	3
Malaysia (MAS)	0
Myanmar (MYA)	3
Brunei (BRU)	0

Quarter-final
Indonesia (INA)	3
Cambodia (CAM)	0
Vietnam (VIE)	1
Philippines (PHI)	2
Myanmar (MYA)	2
Singapore (SIN)	1
Laos (LAO)	0
Thailand (THA)	3

Semi-Final
Indonesia (INA)	3
Philippines (PHI)	0
Myanmar (MYA)	0
Thailand (THA)	3

Final
Indonesia (INA)	2
Thailand (THA)	1

==== 1st Round ====
9 September	Philippines (PHI)	3–0	Malaysia (MAS)

Joseph Victorino	2–0	Mohd Nazreen Fuzi	6-3, 7-6
Johnny Arcilla	2–1	V. Selvam	2-6, 7-6, 6-4
Johnny Arcilla / Michael Mora III	2–0	Adam Jaya / Mohd Nazreen Fuzi	6-3, 7-5

9 September	Myanmar (MYA)	3–0	Brunei (BRU)

Maung Zaw Zaw	2–0	Billy Wong	6-1, 6-4
Khin Maung Win	2–0	Ian Chok	6-1, 6-0
M Tu Tu Tu Ja / Maung Tu Mau		Ak Aki Ismasufian / Abdul Rasheed Abdulla

==== Quarter-final ====
9 September	Indonesia (INA)	3–0	Cambodia (CAM)

9 September	Laos (LAO)	0–3	Thailand (THA)

10 September	Vietnam (VIE)	1–2	Philippines (PHI)

10 September	Myanmar (MYA)	2–1	Singapore (SIN)

==== Semi-final ====
11 September	Indonesia (INA)	3–0	Philippines (PHI)

Peter Handoyo	2–0	Joseph Victorino	6-2, 6-2
Suwandi	2–0	Johnny Arcilla	6-3, 6-4
Sulistyo Wibowo / Bonit Wiryawan	2–1	Johnny Arcilla / Michael Mora III	6-3, 5-7, 6-2

11 September	Myanmar (MYA)	0–3	Thailand (THA)

Khin Maung Win	0–2	Vittaya Samrej	2-6, 0-6
Maung Zaw Zaw Latt	0–2	Danai Udomchoke	0-6, 0-6
M Tu Tu Ja / Maung Tu Maw	0–2	Pracharapol Khamsaman / Attapol Rithiwattanapong	1-6, 3-6

==== Final ====
12 September	Indonesia (INA)	2–1	Thailand (THA)

Peter Handoyo	0–2	Vittaya Samrej	3-6, 4-6
Suwandi	2–1	Danai Udomchoke	6-3, 2-6, 7-6 (11-9)
Sulistyo Wibowo / Bonit Wiryawan	2–0	Vittaya Samrej / Danai Udomchoke	6-1, 6-3

=== Women's team ===
Quarter-final
Philippines (PHI)	3
Vietnam (VIE)	0
Singapore (SIN)	0
Malaysia (MAS)	3

Semi-Final
Indonesia (INA)	3
Philippines (PHI)	0
Malaysia (MAS)	2
Thailand (THA)	1

Final
Indonesia (INA)	3
Malaysia (MAS)	0

==== Quarter-final ====
9 September	Philippines (PHI)	3–0	Vietnam (VIE)

Czarina Mae Arevalo	2–1	Nguyen Kim Trang thua	6-3, 2-6, 7-6
Jennifer Saret	2–0	Tuyet Minh thua	6-0, 6-1
Jennifer Saret / Kara Guzman	2–0	Nguyen Kim Loi / Tuyet Minh thua	6-4, 6-4

9 September	Singapore (SIN)	0–3	Malaysia (MAS)

Leow Yik Mui	0–2	Tan Lynn Yin	3-6, 4-6
Wong Rui Jing Jaime	1–2	Khoo Chin Bee	4-6, 6-3, 3-6
Leow Yik Hui / Sonya Kumar	0–2	Tan Lynn Yin / Liaw Chen Yee	2-6, 0-6

==== Semi-final ====
10 September	Indonesia (INA)	3–0	Philippines (PHI)

10 September	Malaysia (MAS)	2–1	Thailand (THA)

Tan Lynn Yin	0–2	Napaporn Tongsalee	3-6, 2-6
Khoo Chin Bee	2–1	Suchanun Viratprasert	4-6, 6-2, 7-5
Tan Lynn Yin / Khoo Chin Bee	2–0	Napaporn Tongsalee / Suchanun Viratprasert	7-5, 6-2

==== Final ====
11 September	Indonesia (INA)	3–0	Malaysia (MAS)

Romana Tedjakusuma	2–0	Tan Lynn Yin	6-2, 6-1
Wynne Prakusya	2–0	Khoo Chin Bee	6-1, 6-4
Yayuk Basuki / Angelique Widjaja	2–0	Tan Lynn Yin / Liaw Chen Yee	6-1, 6-0

=== Men's singles ===
==== Final ====
Final
1	Suwandi (INA)	3	1
2	Danai Udomchoke (THA)	6	6

==== Top half ====
1st round
5	Johnny Arcilla (PHI)	6	6
12	Jun Kevin Ong (SIN)	4	3
2	Do Thanh Hoang (VIE)	6	6
15	Soumpholpakdy Chittaphone (LAO)	3	4

2nd round
1	Suwandi (INA)	6	6
Pel Vanna (CAM)	0	0
Johnny Arcilla (PHI)	6	6
Maung Zaw Latt (MYA)	2	1
4	Attapol Rithiwattanapong (THA)	6	6
Billy Wong (BRU)	2	2
V. Selvam (MAS)	6	6	6
Do Thanh Hoang (VIE)	7	4	1

Quarterfinals
1	Suwandi (INA)	6	6
Johnny Arcilla (PHI)	3	0
4	Attapol Rithiwattanapong (THA)	3	6	5
V. Selvam (MAS)	6	3	7

Semifinals
1	Suwandi (INA)	6	6
V. Selvam (MAS)	2	3

==== Bottom half ====
1st round
8	M Tu Tu Ja (MYA)	6	6
9	Vongsay Xayadeth (LAO)	1	0

2nd round
Do Minh Quan (VIE)	4	6	6
M Tu Tu Ja (MYA)	6	4	0
Adam Jaya (MAS)	1	2
3	Peter Handoyo (INA)	6	6
Tola Thun (CAM)	1	1
Joseph Victorino (PHI)	6	6
Jensen Hui (SIN)	0	1
2	Danai Udomchoke (THA)	6	6

Quarterfinals
Do Minh Quan (VIE)	0	3
3	Peter Handoyo (INA)	6	6
Joseph Victorino (PHI)	3	0
2	Danai Udomchoke (THA)	6	6

Semifinals
3	Peter Handoyo (INA)	1	3
2	Danai Udomchoke (THA)	6	6

=== Women's singles ===
1st round
4	Wong Rui-Jing Jaime (SIN)	6	6
13	Guzman Kara Melinda (PHI)	2	2
6	Tran Thi Kim Loi (VIE)	6	7
11	Leow Yik Hui (SIN)	3	6
7	Czarina Mae Arevalo (PHI)	6	5	6
10	Napaporn Tongsalee (THA)	4	7	1

Quarterfinals
Wynne Prakusya (INA)	6	6
Tan Lynn-Yin (MAS)	1	0
Suchanan Viratprasert (THA)	6	6
Wong Rui-Jing Jaime (SIN)	1	1
Tran Thi Kim Loi (VIE)	0	0
Khoo Chin Bee (MAS)	6	6
Czarina Mae Arevalo (PHI)	0	1
Romana Tedjakusuma (INA)	6	6

Semifinals
Wynne Prakusya (INA)	4	6	6
Suchanan Viratprasert (THA)	6	3	4
Khoo Chin Bee (MAS)	6	3	0
Romana Tedjakusuma (INA)	4	6	6

Final
Wynne Prakusya (INA)	5	2
Romana Tedjakusuma (INA)	7	6

=== Men's doubles ===
1st round
8	Joseph Lizardo (PHI); Joseph Victorino (PHI)	6	6
9	Chittapone Soumpholpakdy (LAO); Eakalath Phonepraseuth (LAO)	2	1
4	Do Minh Quan (VIE); Huynh Ch Khuong (VIE)	6	6
13	A Rasheed Abdullah (BRU); Ian Chok (BRU)	2	1
3	Chansomphou Vonsavath (LAO); Vongsay Xayadeth (LAO)	1	1
14	Adam Jaya (MAS); Mohd Nazreen Fuzi (MAS)	6	6
7	Pel Vanna (CAM); Davin Chhit (CAM)	6	3	6
10	Billy Wong (BRU); Ak Aki Ismasufian (BRU)	2	6	2

Quarterfinals
Sulistyo Wibowo (INA); Bonit Wiryawan (INA)	6	6
Joseph Lizardo (PHI); Joseph Victorino (PHI)	2	0
P Khamsaman (THA); A Rithiwattanapong (THA)	6	6
Do Minh Quan (VIE); Huynh Ch Khuong (VIE)	1	2
Truong Quoc Bao (VIE); Do Thanh Hoang (VIE)	2	5
Adam Jaya (MAS); Mohd Nazreen Fuzi (MAS)	6	7
Pel Vanna (CAM); Davin Chhit (CAM)	0	0
Vittaya Samrej (THA); Danai Udomchoke (THA)	6	6

Semifinals
Sulistyo Wibowo (INA); Bonit Wiryawan (INA)	6	6
P Khamsaman (THA); Attapol Rithiwattanapong (THA)	4	0
Adam Jaya (MAS); Mohd Nazreen Fuzi (MAS)	2	0
Vittaya Samrej (THA); Danai Udomchoke (THA)	6	6

Final
Sulistyo Wibowo (INA); Bonit Wiryawan (INA)	6	6	3
Vittaya Samrej (THA); Danai Udomchoke (THA)	7	3	6

=== Women's doubles ===
1st round

Quarterfinals
Nguyen Thi Kim Trang (VIE); Trang Tuet Minh (VIE)	4	6	4
Orawan Lamanthong (THA); Chattida Thimjapo (THA)	6	3	6
Napaporn Tongsalee (THA); Suchanun Viratprasert (THA)	6	6
Leow Hik Hui (SIN); Sonya Kumar (SIN)	4	3
Czarina Mae Arevalo (PHI); Jennifer Saret (PHI)	1	2
Romana Tedjakusuma (INA); Angelique Widjaja (INA)	6	6

Semifinals
Yayuk Basuki (INA); Wynne Prakusya (INA)	6	6
Orawan Lamanthong (THA); Chattida Thimjapo (THA)	3	1
Napaporn Tongsalee (THA); Suchanun Viratprasert (THA)	2	4
Romana Tedjakusuma (INA); Angelique Widjaja (INA)	6	6

Final
Yayuk Basuki (INA); Wynne Prakusya (INA)	6	6
Romana Tedjakusuma (INA); Angelique Widjaja (INA)	2	1

=== Mixed doubles ===
1st round
4	Mohd Nazreen Fuzi (MAS); Tan Lynn Yin (MAS)	6	4	0
13	Huynh Chi Kuong (VIE); Tran Tuet Minh (VIE)	2	6	6

Quarterfinals
Suwandi (INA); Yayuk Basuki (INA)	6	6
Hui Jensen (SIN); Wong Rui-Jing Jaime (SIN)	1	2
Vittaya Samrej (THA); Chatida Thimjapo (THA)	6	7
Huynh Chi Kuong (VIE); Tran Tuet Minh (VIE)	1	5
V. Selvam (MAS); Khoo Chin Bee (MAS)	6	6
P Khamsaman (THA); Orawan Lamanthong (THA)	4	2
Truong Quoc Bao (VIE); Nguyen Kim Trang thua (VIE)	6	1
Bonit Wiryawan (INA); Angelique Widjaja (INA)	7	6

Semifinals
Suwandi (INA); Yayuk Basuki (INA)	6	6
Vittaya Samrej (THA); Chatida Thimjapo (THA)	4	4
V. Selvam (MAS); Khoo Chin Bee (MAS)	3	1
Bonit Wiryawan (INA); Angelique Widjaja (INA)	6	6

Final
Suwandi (INA); Yayuk Basuki (INA)
Bonit Wiryawan (INA); Angelique Widjaja (INA)	w/o

== Medal table ==
Legend

* Host nation (Malaysia)

Rank	Nation	Gold	Silver	Bronze	Total
1	Indonesia (INA)	5	5	1	11
2	Thailand (THA)	2	1	6	9
3	Malaysia (MAS)*	0	1	4	5
4	Philippines (PHI)	0	0	2	2
5	Myanmar (MYA)	0	0	1	1
Totals (5 entries)		7	7	14	28
