= Romana Tedjakusuma =

Indonesian tennis player

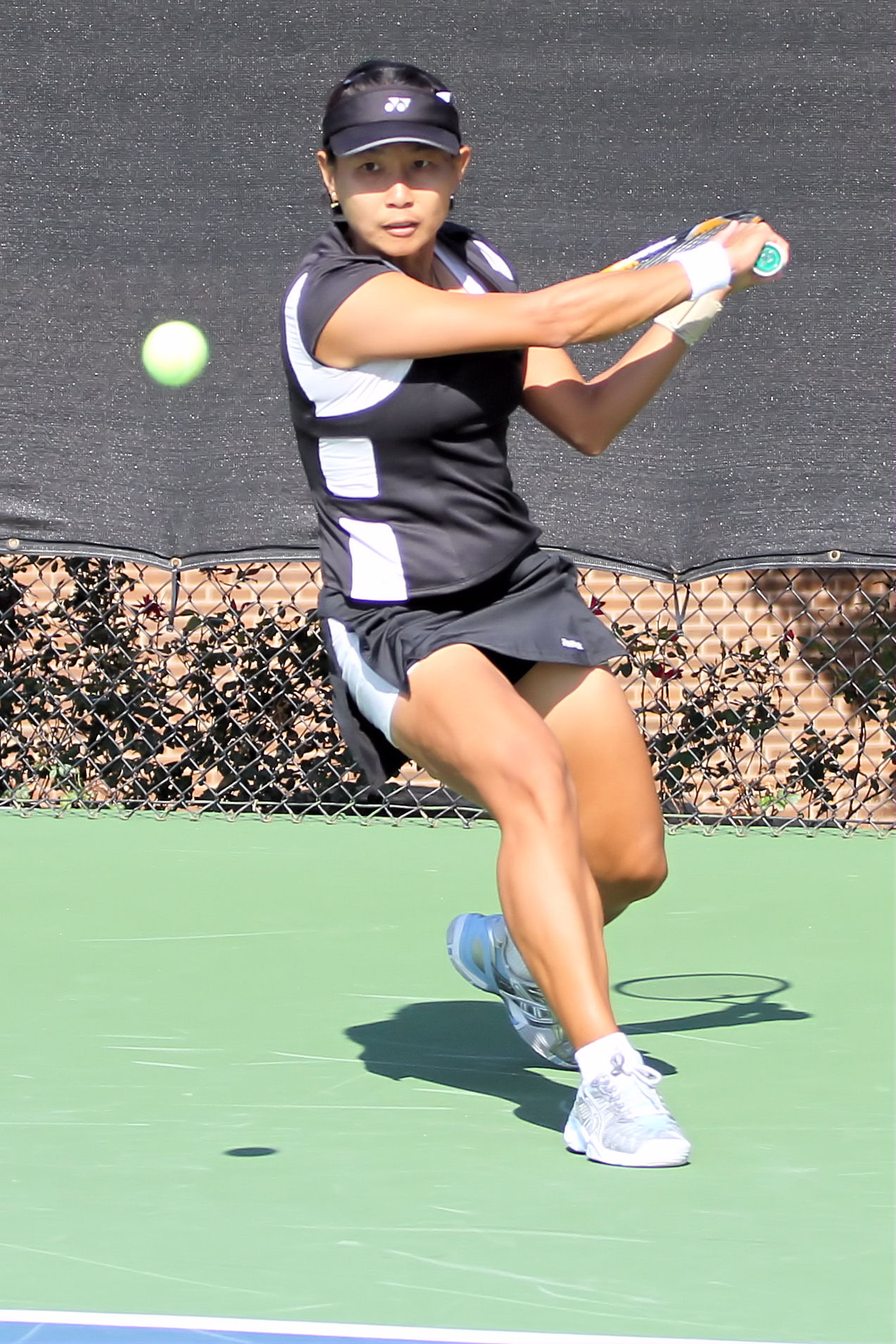
- Country (sports): Indonesia
- Residence: Jakarta, Indonesia
- Born: 24 July 1976 (age 50) Surabaya, Indonesia
- Turned pro: 1990
- Retired: 2013
- Plays: Right (two-handed backhand)
- Prize money: $156,848

Singles
- Career record: 261–192
- Career titles: 6 ITF
- Highest ranking: No. 82 (4 April 1994)

Grand Slam singles results
- Australian Open: 3R (1994)
- French Open: 1R (1994)
- US Open: 1R (1994)

Doubles
- Career record: 175–102
- Career titles: 1 WTA, 19 ITF
- Highest ranking: No. 114 (20 February 1995)
Medal record
Women's Tennis
Representing Indonesia
Asian Games
Silver medal – second place	1994 Hiroshima	Women's team
SEA Games
Gold medal – first place	1993 Singapore	Women's singles
Gold medal – first place	1993 Singapore	Women's team
Gold medal – first place	1995 Chiang Mai	Women's doubles
Gold medal – first place	1995 Chiang Mai	Women's team
Gold medal – first place	1999 Bandar Seri Begawan	Women's doubles
Gold medal – first place	1999 Bandar Seri Begawan	Women's team
Gold medal – first place	2001 Kuala Lumpur	Women's singles
Gold medal – first place	2001 Kuala Lumpur	Women's team
Gold medal – first place	2005 Manila	Women's doubles
Gold medal – first place	2005 Manila	Women's team
Silver medal – second place	1995 Chiang Mai	Mixed doubles
Silver medal – second place	2001 Kuala Lumpur	Women's doubles
Silver medal – second place	2005 Manila	Women's singles
Silver medal – second place	2007 Nakhon Ratchasima	Women's doubles
Silver medal – second place	2007 Nakhon Ratchasima	Women's team
Bronze medal – third place	1995 Chiang Mai	Women's singles
Bronze medal – third place	1993 Singapore	Women's doubles
Bronze medal – third place	1993 Singapore	Mixed doubles
Bronze medal – third place	2007 Nakhon Ratchasima	Women's singles

Romana Tedjakusuma (born 24 July 1976) is a former professional tennis player from Indonesia.

She made her debut in professional competition in January 1990, aged 13, at an ITF tournament in Jakarta.

In 1993 and 1994, she played in a number of junior Grand Slam championships; partnered with Park Sung-hee, she reached the semifinals of the 1993 Wimbledon Championships. During 1994, she also competed in three professional Grand Slam tournaments. Her best result at that level was her third round appearance in the Australian Open.

She was part of Indonesia's team at the 1996 Summer Olympics in Atlanta. She and partner Yayuk Basuki reached the second round of the women's doubles event, where they were defeated by Jana Novotná and Helena Suková.

Tedjakusuma had two hiatuses during her professional career: from 1997 to 1998, and from 2002 to 2004. After her return in 2005 she won 14 further doubles titles and one singles title on the ITF Circuit. She was Indonesia's highest-ranked doubles player in April 2009.

She was part of Indonesia's Fed Cup team in 1993, 1994, 1995, 1996, 2001, 2005 and 2006.

At the 2005 SEA Games, Tedjakusuma won the gold medal in the women's doubles competition, partnered by Wynne Prakusya, and the silver medal in singles. At the 2007 SEA Games, she won the silver medal in the women's doubles, partnered by Sandy Gumulya, and the bronze medal in singles.

Tedjakusuma was inactive on the ITF Circuit in 2010, but returned to play in several tournaments in 2011, winning one doubles title partnered by South African Surina de Beer. Tedjakusuma retired from professional tennis in 2013.

== WTA Tour finals ==
Legend
Tier I
Tier II
Tier III
Tier IV & V

=== Doubles: 1 (title) ===
Result	Date	Tournament	Surface	Partner	Opponents	Score
Win	13 November 1994	Surabaya, Indonesia	Hard	(Indonesia) Yayuk Basuki	(Japan) Kyōko Nagatsuka (Japan) Ai Sugiyama	w/o

== ITF finals ==
=== Singles: 14 (6–8) ===
Legend
$100,000 tournaments
$75,000 tournaments
$50,000 tournaments
$25,000 tournaments
$10,000 tournaments

Result	No.	Date	Tournament	Surface	Opponent	Score
Win	1.	Feb 1993	ITF Bandar, Brunei	Hard	(Thailand) Suvimol Duangchan	6–1, 6–2
Win	2.	Feb 1993	ITF Bandung, Indonesia	Hard	(Japan) Madoka Kuki	6–2, 6–0
Win	3.	Mar 1993	ITF Bangkok, Thailand	Hard	(Australia) Nicole Pratt	6–3, 6–2
Loss	1.	Oct 1993	ITF Jakarta, Indonesia	Hard	(South Africa) Tessa Price	6–7, 2–6
Loss	2.	Nov 1993	ITF Singapore	Hard	(Australia) Kristin Godridge	6–4, 4–6, 4–6
Loss	3.	Oct 2000	ITF Jakarta, Indonesia	Hard	(South Korea) Chae Kyung-yee	5–4^{(7)}, 4–1, 1–4, 4–1
Win	4.	Nov 2000	ITF Bandung, Indonesia	Hard	(South Korea) Chae Kyung-yee	2–4, 5–5, 4–2, 4–5, 4–1
Loss	4.	Nov 2000	ITF Manila, Philippines	Hard	(Japan) Miho Saeki	0–4, 0–4
Win	5.	Jul 2001	ITF Amsterdam, Netherlands	Clay	(Russia) Ilona Vichnevskaya	3–6, 6–4, 7–6^{(7)}
Loss	5.	Jul 2001	ITF Sezze, Italy	Clay	(Ukraine) Yuliya Beygelzimer	2–6, 3–6
Loss	6.	May 2005	ITF Tarakan, Indonesia	Hard (i)	(Indonesia) Wynne Prakusya	4–6, 2–6
Win	6.	Nov 2006	ITF Jakarta, Indonesia	Hard	(Indonesia) Ayu Fani Damayanti	6–2, 6–1
Loss	7.	Aug 2008	ITF Versmold, Germany	Clay	(Italy) Evelyn Mayr	7–5, 4–6, 3–6
Loss	8.	Mar 2011	ITF Poza Rica, Mexico	Hard	(Bolivia) María Fernanda Álvarez Terán	3–6, 4–6

=== Doubles: 30 (19–11) ===
Result	No.	Date	Tournament	Surface	Partner	Opponents	Score
Loss	1.	1 June 1992	ITF Seoul, South Korea	Clay	(Indonesia) Suzanna Wibowo	(South Korea) Kim Il-soon (South Korea) Lee Jeong-myung	3–6, 3–6
Loss	2.	8 June 1992	ITF Seoul, South Korea	Hard	(Indonesia) Suzanna Wibowo	(South Korea) Kim Il-soon (South Korea) Lee Jeong-myung	3–6, 4–6
Win	1.	1 February 1993	ITF Bandar, Brunei	Hard	(Indonesia) Suzanna Wibowo	(United States) Varalee Sureephong (Thailand) Tamarine Tanasugarn	6–3, 6–1
Loss	3.	8 February 1993	ITF Solo, Indonesia	Hard	(Indonesia) Natalia Soetrisno	(South Korea) Kim Il-soon (South Korea) Kim Soon-mi	3–6, 2–6
Win	2.	15 February 1993	ITF Bandung, Indonesia	Hard	(Indonesia) Natalia Soetrisno	(South Korea) Park Ka-young (South Korea) Seo Hye-jin	6–2, 6–1
Loss	4.	5 December 1993	ITF Singapore	Hard	(Indonesia) Natalia Soetrisno	(Philippines) Francesca La'O (Philippines) Evangelina Olivarez	w/o
Loss	5.	8 January 2001	ITF Tallahassee, United States	Hard	(India) Jyotsna Vasisht	(Netherlands) Mariëlle Hoogland (Netherlands) Anousjka van Exel	6–7, 2–6
Loss	6.	2 July 2001	ITF Amsterdam, Netherlands	Clay	(Japan) Remi Tezuka	(South Africa) Mareze Joubert (Netherlands) Andrea van den Hurk	2–6, 2–6
Win	3.	13 August 2001	Nonthaburi, Thailand	Hard	(Indonesia) Angelique Widjaja	(South Korea) Kim Jin-hee (South Korea) Chae Kyung-yee	4–6, 6–3, 7–5
Win	4.	11 April 2005	Hvar, Croatia	Clay	(Indonesia) Wynne Prakusya	(Czech Republic) Lucie Kriegsmannová (Czech Republic) Darina Sedenková	1–6, 6–0, 6–3
Win	5.	3 May 2005	Tarakan, Indonesia	Hard (i)	(Indonesia) Wynne Prakusya	(Indonesia) Maya Rosa (Indonesia) Eny Sulistyowati	7–5, 6–2
Win	6.	16 May 2005	Ho Chi Minh City, Vietnam	Hard	(Indonesia) Wynne Prakusya	(Uzbekistan) Akgul Amanmuradova (Thailand) Napaporn Tongsalee	6–4, 6–0
Win	7.	19 July 2005	Evansville, United States	Hard	(Indonesia) Wynne Prakusya	(United States) Kristi Miller (United States) Christian Tara	6–0, 6–1
Win	8.	26 July 2005	St. Joseph, United States	Hard	(Indonesia) Wynne Prakusya	(United States) Lauren Barnikow (United States) Raquel Kops-Jones	6–2, 6–3
Loss	7.	20 September 2005	Albuquerque, United States	Hard	(Thailand) Napaporn Tongsalee	(United States) Julie Ditty (Venezuela) Milagros Sequera	3–6, 7–6, 6–7
Loss	8.	28 March 2006	Hammond, United States	Hard	(Uzbekistan) Akgul Amanmuradova	(United States) Tetiana Luzhanska (Chinese Taipei) Chan Chin-wei	1–6, 3–6
Win	9.	9 April 2006	Pelham, United States	Clay	(United States) Tetiana Luzhanska	(United States) Tiffany Dabek (South Africa) Chanelle Scheepers	6–4, 6–1
Win	10.	7 November 2006	Jakarta, Indonesia	Hard	(Indonesia) Angelique Widjaja	(South Korea) Kim Hea-mi (Japan) Keiko Taguchi	w/o
Win	11.	6 May 2007	Incheon, South Korea	Hard	(United States) Tetiana Luzhanska	(South Korea) Lee Jin-a (South Korea) Yoo Mi	6–1, 6–4
Loss	9.	7 May 2007	Gimcheon, South Korea	Hard	(United States) Tetiana Luzhanska	(Chinese Taipei) Chan Chin-wei (Chinese Taipei) Hsieh Su-wei	5–7, 4–6
Loss	10.	7 May 2007	Changwon, South Korea	Hard	(Thailand) Napaporn Tongsalee	(Chinese Taipei) Chan Chin-wei (Chinese Taipei) Kao Shao-yuan	4–6, 4–6
Win	12.	26 May 2008	Carson, United States	Hard	(United States) Story Tweedie-Yates	(United States) Kimberly Couts (Georgia (country)) Anna Tatishvili	7–6^{(12)}, 4–6 [10–7]
Win	13.	10 Aug 2008	Hechingen, Germany	Clay	(Indonesia) Yayuk Basuki	(Germany) Carmen Klaschka (Croatia) Darija Jurak	2–6, 6–2 [10–6]
Loss	11.	19 October 2008	Lawrenceville, United States	Hard	(Indonesia) Yayuk Basuki	(United States) Julie Ditty (United States) Carly Gullickson	6–3, 4–6 [10–12]
Win	14.	25 October 2008	Augusta, United States	Hard	(Indonesia) Yayuk Basuki	(Argentina) Mailen Auroux (Brazil) Roxane Vaisemberg	6–3, 4–6, [10–5]
Win	15.	4 May 2009	Balikpapan, Indonesia	Hard	(Indonesia) Yayuk Basuki	(Hong Kong) Zhang Ling (United Kingdom) Emily Webley-Smith	6–3, 6–3
Win	16.	31 May 2009	Goyang, South Korea	Hard	(Indonesia) Yayuk Basuki	(China) Sun Shengnan (China) Lu Jingjing	6–7^{(5)}, 6–3, [10–8]
Win	17.	2 June 2009	ITF Gimhae, South Korea	Hard	(Indonesia) Yayuk Basuki	(China) Liang Chen (China) Sun Shengnan	7–5, 6–1
Win	18.	2 November 2009	ITF Kuching, Malaysia	Hard	(Indonesia) Lavinia Tananta	(South Korea) Han Sung-hee (South Korea) Kang Seo-kyung	6–2, 7–5
Win	19.	14 March 2011	ITF Metepec, Mexico	Hard	(South Africa) Surina De Beer	(Mexico) Nadia Abdalá (France) Virginie Ayassamy	6–2, 6–4
