= Wynne Prakusya =

Indonesian tennis player

- Country (sports): Indonesia
- Residence: Jakarta
- Born: 26 April 1981 (age 45) Surakarta
- Height: 1.60 m (5 ft 3 in)
- Turned pro: 1998
- Plays: Right (two-handed backhand)
- Prize money: $549,498

Singles
- Career record: 234–159
- Career titles: 9 ITF
- Highest ranking: No. 74 (5 August 2002)

Grand Slam singles results
- Australian Open: 1R (2001, 2002)
- French Open: 2R (2002)
- Wimbledon: 2R (2002)
- US Open: 2R (2001)

Doubles
- Career record: 193–132
- Career titles: 2 WTA, 17 ITF
- Highest ranking: No. 24 (17 February 2003)

Grand Slam doubles results
- Australian Open: 2R (2001, 2002, 2003)
- French Open: 2R (2001)
- Wimbledon: 3R (2003)
- US Open: 2R (2002)

Grand Slam mixed doubles results
- Australian Open: QF (2003)
- French Open: 1R (2002, 2003)
- Wimbledon: 3R (2002)
Medal record
Women's tennis
Representing Indonesia
Asian Games
Gold medal – first place	2002 Busan	Team
Silver medal – second place	2002 Busan	Doubles
Bronze medal – third place	1998 Bangkok	Team
SEA Games
Gold medal – first place	1997 Jakarta	Doubles
Gold medal – first place	1997 Jakarta	Team
Gold medal – first place	1999 Bandar Seri Begawan	Doubles
Gold medal – first place	1999 Bandar Seri Begawan	Team
Gold medal – first place	2001 Kuala Lumpur	Doubles
Gold medal – first place	2001 Kuala Lumpur	Team
Gold medal – first place	2003 Vietnam	Doubles
Gold medal – first place	2003 Vietnam	Mixed doubles
Gold medal – first place	2005 Manila	Singles
Gold medal – first place	2005 Manila	Doubles
Gold medal – first place	2005 Manila	Team
Silver medal – second place	1999 Bandar Seri Begawan	Singles
Silver medal – second place	2001 Kuala Lumpur	Singles
Silver medal – second place	2003 Vietnam	Team
Silver medal – second place	2005 Manila	Mixed doubles
Silver medal – second place	2007 Nakhon Ratchasima	Team
Bronze medal – third place	1997 Jakarta	Singles

Wynne Prakusya (born 26 April 1981) is a former tennis player from Indonesia.

Her first appearance in a professional tournament occurred in 1996, when she was 14 years old. She formally went professional in 1998. Over her career, she has won two WTA doubles titles, nine singles and 17 doubles ITF titles. As a junior, her highest achievements includes reaching the 1998 Australian Open junior finals and the 1998 Wimbledon junior quarterfinals.

Her first appearance at a WTA event took place in September 1997 at the Wismilak International in Surabaya. The first time she won a match in the WTA Tour was in the 1999 Wismilak International in Kuala Lumpur. In 2000, Prakusya began to attempt qualification for the main draws of major tournaments. She also began to appear primarily at WTA rather than ITF events. Her first win in the main draw of a major came in the 2001 Australian Open, in which she and partner Janet Lee reached round two in the women's doubles. Her first tournament win on the WTA Tour was in the doubles draw of the Stanford Classic in 2001, again with partner Janet Lee.

She and Lee also qualified for the WTA Tour Championships in Los Angeles in 2002.

She represented Indonesia at the 2004 Summer Olympics, this time partnered by Angelique Widjaja. Prakusya successfully represented Indonesia at the 2002 Asian Games, the 2005 SEA Games and the 2007 SEA Games, winning seven medals in total.

She was part of the Indonesia Fed Cup team in every year from 1996 to 2005. She was part of the 2004 team which saw Indonesia return to the Fed Cup World Group: in that year, Prakusya won 11 of her 12 Fed Cup matches.

She has been inactive on the professional tennis circuit since 2007.

== WTA Tour finals ==
=== Doubles: 7 (2 titles, 5 runner-ups) ===
Legend Tier I Tier II (1–0) Tier III (1–3) Tier IV & V (0–2)	Finals by surface Hard (2–5)

Result	No.	Date	Tournament	Surface	Partner	Opponents	Score
Loss	1.	Feb 2001	Indoor Championships, United States	Hard (i)	(Chinese Taipei) Janet Lee	(South Africa) Amanda Coetzer (United States) Lori McNeil	3–6, 6–2, 0–6
Win	1.	Jul 2001	Stanford Classic, United States	Hard	(Chinese Taipei) Janet Lee	(United States) Nicole Arendt (Netherlands) Caroline Vis	3–6, 6–3, 6–3
Loss	2.	Sep 2001	Bali Classic, Indonesia	Hard	(Chinese Taipei) Janet Lee	(Australia) Evie Dominikovic (Thailand) Tamarine Tanasugarn	7–6^{(7–4)}, 2–6, 3–6
Loss	3.	Oct 2001	Japan Open, Japan	Hard	(Chinese Taipei) Janet Lee	(South Africa) Liezel Huber (Australia) Rachel McQuillan	2–6, 0–6
Loss	4.	Nov 2001	Pattaya Open, Thailand	Hard	(South Africa) Liezel Huber	(Sweden) Åsa Carlsson (Uzbekistan) Iroda Tulyaganova	6–4, 3–6, 3–6
Win	2.	Feb 2003	Qatar Ladies Open, Qatar	Hard	(Chinese Taipei) Janet Lee	(Venezuela) María Vento-Kabchi (Indonesia) Angelique Widjaja	6–1, 6–3
Loss	5.	Nov 2003	Pattaya Open, Thailand	Hard	(Indonesia) Angelique Widjaja	(China) Sun Tiantian (China) Li Ting	4–6, 3–6

== ITF Circuit finals ==
=== Singles: 15 (9 titles, 5 runner-ups, 1 not played) ===
Legend $50,000 tournaments $25,000 tournaments $10,000 tournaments	Finals by surface Hard (8–4) Clay (0–1) Carpet (1–0)

Result	No.	Date	Tournament	Surface	Opponent	Score
Win	1.	3 August 1997	ITF Bandung, Indonesia	Hard	(South Korea) Won Kyung-joo	6–4, 7–6
Loss	1.	16 November 1997	ITF Manila, Philippines	Clay	(South Korea) Choi Ju-yeon	6–0, 1–6, 4–6
Win	2.	8 February 1998	ITF Wellington, New Zealand	Hard	(New Zealand) Rewa Hudson	7–5, 6–2
Loss	2.	12 April 1998	ITF Dubai, United Arab Emirates	Hard	(Hungary) Kira Nagy	4–6, 1–6
Win	3.	25 April 1999	ITF Jakarta, Indonesia	Hard	(Slovakia) Stanislava Hrozenská	6–3, 6–4
Loss	3.	10 October 1999	ITF Dalby, Australia	Hard	(Australia) Annabel Ellwood	6–7, 6–7
Loss	4.	13 December 1999	ITF Manila, Philippines	Hard	(Italy) Tathiana Garbin	7–6, 0–6, 2–6
Loss	5.	18 May 2000	ITF Ho Chi Minh City, Vietnam	Hard	(China) Li Na	1–6, 2–6
Win	4.	30 July 2000	ITF Salt Lake City, United States	Hard	(South Africa) Jessica Steck	4–6, 6–4, 7–6^{(21–19)}
Finalist	—N/a	16 March 2003	ITF Mesa, United States	Hard	(Canada) Maureen Drake	not played
Win	5.	16 May 2004	ITF Karuizawa, Japan	Carpet	(Australia) Sophie Ferguson	1–6, 6–3, 6–1
Win	6.	8 May 2005	ITF Tarakan, Indonesia	Hard (i)	(Indonesia) Romana Tedjakusuma	6–4, 6–2
Win	7.	22 May 2005	ITF Ho Chi Minh City, Vietnam	Hard	(Chinese Taipei) Hsu Wen-hsin	6–4, 6–1
Win	8.	31 July 2005	ITF St. Joseph, United States	Hard	(United States) Sarah Riske	6–2, 6–4
Win	9.	13 November 2005	ITF Jakarta, Indonesia	Hard	(Chinese Taipei) Chuang Chia-jung	6–4, 4–6, 6–1

=== Doubles: 24 (17 titles, 7 runner-ups) ===
Legend $50,000 tournaments $25,000 tournaments $10,000 tournaments	Finals by surface Hard (15–5) Clay (1–1) Carpet (1–1)

Result	No.	Date	Tournament	Surface	Partner	Opponents	Score
Loss	1.	6 April 1997	ITF Bandung, Indonesia	Hard	(Indonesia) Eny Sulistyowati	(Japan) Tomoe Hotta (Japan) Yoriko Yamagishi	6–2, 6–7, 5–7
Win	1.	24 August 1997	ITF Samutprakarn, Thailand	Hard	(Indonesia) Wukirasih Sawondari	(South Korea) Lee Eun-jeong (South Korea) Park Seon-young	6–4, 7–5
Loss	2.	8 February 1998	ITF Wellington, New Zealand	Hard	(Singapore) Leong Jil-Lin	(Australia) Kym Hazzard (New Zealand) Shelley Stephens	1–6, 6–1, 6–7^{(4–7)}
Win	2.	6 April 1998	Dubai Tennis Challenge, United Arab Emirates	Hard	(Thailand) Benjamas Sangaram	(Hungary) Petra Gáspár (San Marino) Ludmila Varmužová	7–6^{(7–1)}, 1–6, 6–3
Win	3.	25 April 1999	ITF Jakarta, Indonesia	Hard	(Indonesia) Irawati Iskandar	(Switzerland) Dianne Asensio (Netherlands) Jolanda Mens	6–1, 6–3
Loss	3.	10 October 1999	ITF Dalby, Australia	Hard	(Australia) Kylie Hunt	(Australia) Kerry-Anne Guse (Australia) Lisa McShea	3–6, 7–5, 4–6
Win	4.	27 February 2000	ITF Jakarta, Indonesia	Hard	(Indonesia) Yayuk Basuki	(Indonesia) Irawati Iskandar (Indonesia) Wukirasih Sawondari	6–4, 6–2
Loss	4.	16 April 2000	ITF La Cañada, United States	Hard	(Chinese Taipei) Janet Lee	(United States) Amanda Augustus (United States) Julie Scott	3–6, 1–6
Win	5.	27 February 2000	Lexington Challenger, United States	Hard	(Chinese Taipei) Janet Lee	(United States) Sandra Cacic (Canada) Renata Kolbovic	6–2, 3–6, 6–2
Win	6.	29 April 2001	ITF Seoul, South Korea	Hard	(South Korea) Kim Eun-ha	(Germany) Angelika Bachmann (Hungary) Adrienn Hegedűs	6–3, 6–2
Win	7.	6 May 2001	Kangaroo Cup, Japan	Carpet	(South Korea) Kim Eun-ha	(United Kingdom) Julie Pullin (United Kingdom) Lorna Woodroffe	1–6, 6–4, 7–6^{(7–2)}
Win	8.	16 November 2003	ITF Manila, Philippines	Hard	(Indonesia) Maya Rosa	(South Korea) Kim Eun-ha (South Korea) Kim Ji-young	2–6, 6–0, 6–4
Loss	5.	29 February 2004	ITF Bendigo, Australia	Hard	(Israel) Shahar Pe'er	(Australia) Casey Dellaqua (Australia) Nicole Sewell	2–6, 6–1, 2–6
Loss	6.	2 May 2004	Kangaroo Cup, Japan	Carpet	(Chinese Taipei) Chuang Chia-jung	(South Korea) Cho Yoon-jeong (South Korea) Jeon Mi-ra	6–7^{(4–7)}, 2–6
Win	9.	13 June 2004	Beijing Challenger, China	Hard (i)	(Chinese Taipei) Chuang Chia-jung	(Latvia) Līga Dekmeijere (Turkey) İpek Şenoğlu	6–3, 6–1
Win	10.	11 April 2005	ITF Hvar, Croatia	Clay	(Indonesia) Romana Tedjakusuma	(Czech Republic) Lucie Kriegsmannová (Czech Republic) Darina Sedenková	1–6, 6–0, 6–3
Win	11.	3 May 2005	ITF Tarakan, Indonesia	Hard (i)	(Indonesia) Romana Tedjakusuma	(Indonesia) Maya Rosa (Indonesia) Eny Sulistyowati	7–5, 6–2
Win	12.	16 May 2005	ITF Ho Chi Minh City, Vietnam	Hard	(Indonesia) Romana Tedjakusuma	(Uzbekistan) Akgul Amanmuradova (Thailand) Napaporn Tongsalee	6–4, 6–0
Win	13.	19 July 2005	ITF Evansville, United States	Hard	(Indonesia) Romana Tedjakusuma	(United States) Kristi Miller (United States) Christian Tara	6–0, 6–1
Win	14.	26 July 2005	ITF St. Joseph, United States	Hard	(Indonesia) Romana Tedjakusuma	(United States) Lauren Barnikow (United States) Raquel Kops-Jones	6–2, 6–3
Win	15.	14 August 2005	ITF Wuxi, China	Hard	(South Korea) Jeon Mi-ra	(Australia) Casey Dellacqua (Australia) Sophie Ferguson	6–2, 7–6^{(8–6)}
Win	16.	6 November 2005	ITF Busan, South Korea	Hard	(Russia) Julia Efremova	(Japan) Seiko Okamoto (Japan) Ayami Takase	6–4, 6–7^{(6–8)}, 6–1
Win	17.	8 November 2005	ITF Jakarta, Indonesia	Hard	(Japan) Ryōko Fuda	(Chinese Taipei) Chan Yung-jan (Chinese Taipei) Chuang Chia-jung	6–4, 6–4
Loss	7.	12 November 2007	ITF Pune, India	Clay	(Indonesia) Angelique Widjaja	(Hong Kong) Zhang Ling (Thailand) Varatchaya Wongteanchai	6–1, 5–7, [5–10]

== Junior Grand Slam tournament finals ==
=== Singles: 1 (runner-up) ===
Result	Year	Tournament	Surface	Opponent	Score
Loss	1998	Australian Open	Hard	(Croatia) Jelena Kostanić	0–6, 5–7

== ITF Junior Circuit finals ==
=== Singles (1–5) ===
Legend Category GA Category G1 Category G2 Category G3	Finals by surface Hard (1–4) Clay (0–1)

Result	No.	Date	Tournament	Surface	Opponent	Score
Loss	1.	March 1994	ITF Jakarta, Indonesia	Hard	(Philippines) Maricris Gentz	2–6, 4–6
Loss	2.	March 1995	ITF Manila, Philippines	Hard	(Philippines) Maricris Gentz	5–7, 3–6
Loss	3.	March 1996	Singapore International Junior	Hard	(South Africa) Lara Van Rooyen	1–6, 2–6
Loss	4.	November 1996	ITF Jakarta, Indonesia	Clay	(Indonesia) Eny Sulistyowati	3–6, 5–7
Win	1.	March 1997	Indonesia International Junior	Hard	(Czech Republic) Veronika Koksova	6–7, 6–4, 7–5
Loss	5.	January 1998	Australian Open	Hard	(Croatia) Jelena Kostanić	0–6, 5–7

=== Doubles (4–2) ===
Legend Category G1 Category G2 / B2 Category G3 Category G4	Finals by surface Hard (3–1) Clay (1–1)

Result	No.	Date	Tournament	Surface	Partner	Opponents	Score
Loss	1.	March 1995	ITF Barranquilla, Colombia	Clay	(Netherlands) Chantal Reuter	(Slovakia) Ľudmila Cervanová (Slovakia) Alena Paulenková	5–7, 6–7
Win	1.	March 1995	Asian Closed Junior	Hard	(Indonesia) Eny Sulistyowati	(South Korea) Won Kyung-joo (South Korea) Cho Yoon-jeong	6–3, 7–6
Win	2.	March 1996	Indonesia International Junior	Hard	(Indonesia) Liza Andriyani	(South Korea) Yoon Hyun-mi (South Korea) Im Seon-young	6–3, 6–4
Win	3.	November 1996	ITF Jakarta, Indonesia	Clay	(Indonesia) Eny Sulistyowati	(Indonesia) Ninisita Srihadi (Indonesia) Mudarwati	6–2, 6–1
Loss	2.	January 1997	Australian Hardcourt Junior	Hard	(Indonesia) Eny Sulistyowati	(Slovakia) Andrea Šebová (Slovakia) Silvia Uríčková	3–6, 4–6
Win	4.	March 1997	Indonesia International Junior	Hard	(Indonesia) Eny Sulistyowati	(Indonesia) Lianasari Batubara (Indonesia) Wukirasih Sawondari	6–3, 6–4

== Grand Slam performance timelines ==
Key
W	F	SF	QF	#R	RR	Q#	DNQ	A	NH

(W) winner; (F) finalist; (SF) semifinalist; (QF) quarterfinalist; (#R) rounds 4, 3, 2, 1; (RR) round-robin stage; (Q#) qualification round; (DNQ) did not qualify; (A) absent; (NH) not held; (SR) strike rate (events won / competed); (W–L) win–loss record.

=== Singles ===
Tournament	2001	2002	2003	2004	Career W–L
Australian Open	A	1R	1R	A	0–2
French Open	1R	2R	1R	A	1–3
Wimbledon	1R	2R	A	A	1–2
US Open	2R	1R	1R	A	1–3
Win–loss	1–3	2–4	0–3	0–0	3–10

=== Women's doubles ===
Tournament	2001	2002	2003	2004	Career W–L
Australian Open	2R	2R	2R	1R	3–4
French Open	2R	1R	1R	A	1–3
Wimbledon	1R	3R	2R	2R	4–4
US Open	1R	2R	1R	A	1–3
Win–loss	2–4	4–4	2–4	1–2	9–14

=== Mixed doubles ===
Tournament	2001	2002	2003	2004	Career W–L
Australian Open	A	A	QF	A	2–1
French Open	A	1R	1R	A	0–2
Wimbledon	A	3R	1R	A	2–2
US Open	A	A	A	A	0–0
Win–loss	0–0	2–2	2–3	0–0	4–5

== See also ==
- Indonesian Chinese
