= Attapol Rithiwattanapong =

Thai tennis player (born 1980)

- Country (sports): Thailand
- Born: 4 May 1980 (age 45) Chonburi, Thailand

Singles
- Highest ranking: No. 887 (9 Dec 2002)

Doubles
- Highest ranking: No. 1362 (13 Aug 2001)
Medal record
Southeast Asian Games
Silver medal – second place	2001 Kuala Lumpur	Men's team
Silver medal – second place	2003 Ho Chi Minh City	Men's team
Bronze medal – third place	2001 Kuala Lumpur	Men's doubles
Bronze medal – third place	2003 Ho Chi Minh City	Men's singles

Attapol Rithiwattanapong (born 4 May 1980) is a Thai former professional tennis player.

Born in Chonburi, Rithiwattanapong represented Thailand at the 2002 Asian Games, 2003 Summer Universiade and in multiple editions of the Southeast Asian Games.

Rithiwattanapong was a member of the Thailand Davis Cup team in 2003, featuring as a doubles player in ties against South Korea and Uzbekistan, both times partnering Narathorn Srichaphan.
