= Benjamin Ebrahimzadeh =

Iranian-German tennis coach and former tennis player

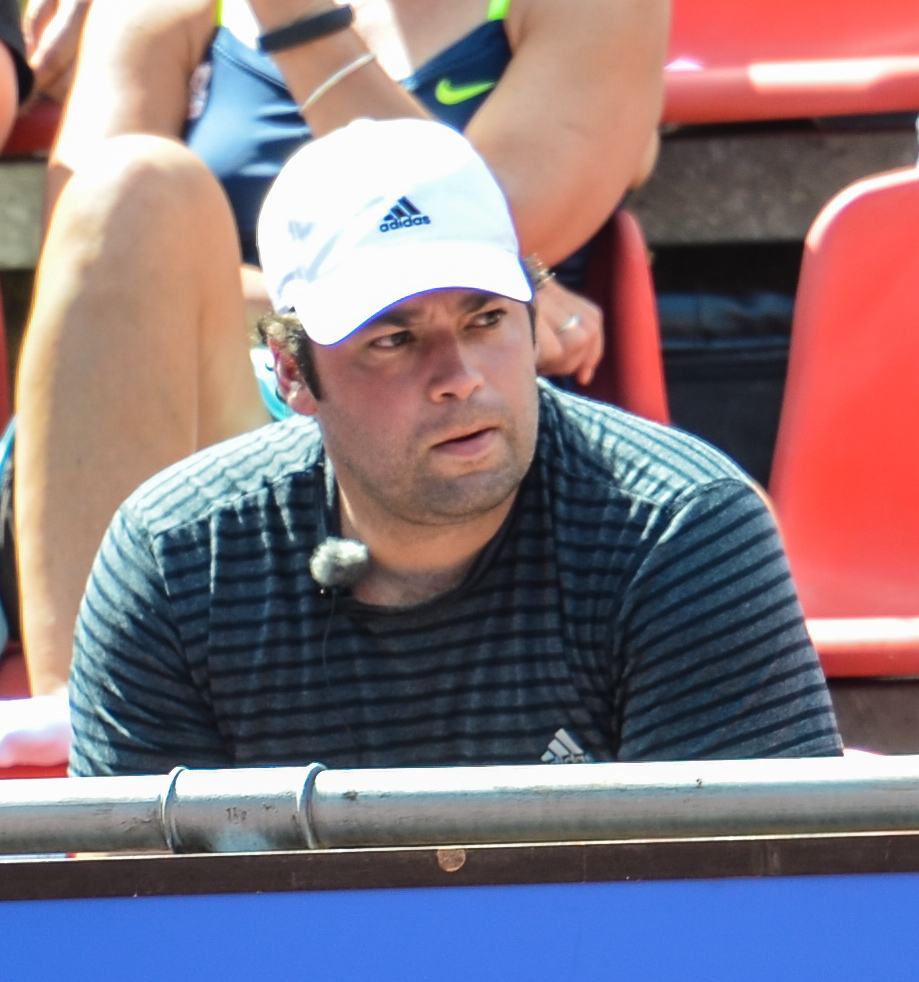
- Country (sports): Iran/Germany
- Born: 3 January 1980 (age 45) Saarbrücken, West Germany
- Plays: Right-handed
- Prize money: $14,351

Singles
- Career record: 0–0 (at ATP Tour level, Grand Slam level, and in Davis Cup)
- Career titles: 0
- Highest ranking: No. 512 (16 January 2006)

Doubles
- Career record: 0–0 (at ATP Tour level and Grand Slam level, and in Davis Cup)
- Career titles: 0
- Highest ranking: No. 737 (7 May 2007)

Benjamin "Benny" Ebrahimzadeh (Persian: بنیامین ابراهیم‌زاده, born 3 January 1980 in Saarbrücken) is a former Iranian-German professional tennis player. He competed for the Iran Davis Cup team in 2008 and started his coaching career that same year.

Ebrahimzadeh is also a broadcast television expert involved in commentating for multiple networks including Eurosport, Sky Sports, DAZN and Prime Video, and a speaker at global tennis engagements.

== Coaching career ==
Ebrahimzadeh has coached top names of the ATP and WTA tours, also being instrumental on the success of many junior players that went on to become top names later in their careers on the professional level.

On the WTA, Ebrahimzadeh achieved great success with two iconic German players. With Angelique Kerber, he helped her climb the rankings from no. 120 to no. 5 in the world, earning two WTA Finals bids. After their time together, Kerber went on to win Grand Slams and reach the top of the WTA ranking. He also worked with Andrea Petkovic, going from no. 60 to breaking into the top 10 for the first time in her career. Other WTA tour players coached include Anastasia Pavlyuchenkova, Victoria Azarenka and Natalya Vikhlyantseva.

On the ATP, Ebrahimzadeh has most recently been working with Stan Wawrinka (2024) and has also worked with Dominic Thiem during his comeback after a series of injuries, reaching his first final in Kitzbühel in 2023. Other ATP tour players coached include Jason Tseng, Jeremy Chardy, Alexei Popyrin and Cedrik-Marcel Stebe.

Ebrahimzadeh has worked as technical coordinator for the Champ' Seed Foundation, a foundation founded by Patrick Mouratoglou, former coach of Serena Williams. Through the foundation and the HighLevel program, he has helped multiple juniors find great success at the junior and professional level. His roster included Coco Gauff (reached the Junior US Open finals in 2017 at age 13), Stefanos Tsitsipas (former ITF no. 1), Alexei Popyrin (2017 Junior Roland Garros champion), Holger Rune, Lorenzo Musetti, Jason Tseng, among others.

Ebrahimzadeh has been consulting for academies and the German Tennis Federation (Deutscher Tennis Bund) since 2018.
