= Napaporn Tongsalee =

Thai tennis player (born 1979)

- Country (sports): Thailand
- Born: 21 October 1979 (age 46) Bangkok
- Turned pro: 2000
- Retired: 2013
- Plays: Right-handed (two-handed backhand)
- Prize money: $77,828

Singles
- Career record: 134–116
- Career titles: 2 ITF
- Highest ranking: No. 226 (7 August 2006)

Doubles
- Career record: 87–78
- Career titles: 6 ITF
- Highest ranking: No. 194 (21 August 2006)

Team competitions
- Fed Cup: 17–24

Napaporn Tongsalee (born 21 October 1979) is a retired Thai tennis player.

In her career, she won six doubles titles on the ITF Women's Circuit, including the 2006 "Incheon Women's Challenger", 2006 Ho Chi Minh City and the 2005 Phuket tournaments doubles titles.

She also won the 2005 "Our Lady Of Bellefonte Hospital Tennis Classic" singles tournament in Ashland, Kentucky. On the 7th of August 2006, she reached her career-high singles ranking of 226 on the WTA rankings. On the 21st of August 2006, she reached her career-high of 194 in the WTA doubles rankings.

== ITF finals ==
$50,000 tournaments
$25,000 tournaments
$10,000 tournaments

=== Singles (2–4) ===
Outcome	No.	Date	Tournament	Surface	Opponent	Score
Runner-up	1.	19 August 2001	Bangkok, Thailand	Hard	(Chinese Taipei) Hsieh Su-wei	3–6, 2–6
Runner-up	2.	30 March 2003	Albury, Australia	Grass	(Australia) Lisa McShea	2–6, 3–6
Runner-up	3.	24 August 2003	Colombo, Sri Lanka	Clay	(Germany) Nadine Hassinger	4–6, 5–7
Winner	4.	3 October 2004	Balikpapan, Indonesia	Hard	(Thailand) Thassha Vitayaviroj	6–4, 7–5
Runner-up	5.	4 December 2004	Bangkok, Thailand	Hard	(Uzbekistan) Akgul Amanmuradova	2–6, 3–6
Winner	6.	2 October 2005	Ashland, United States	Hard	(Puerto Rico) Kristina Brandi	6–4, 2–6, 6–4

=== Doubles (6–6) ===
Outcome	No.	Date	Tournament	Surface	Partner	Opponents	Score
Runner-up	1.	16 November 2003	Port Pirie, Australia	Hard	(New Zealand) Ilke Gers	(Australia) Trudi Musgrave (United States) Abigail Spears	2–6, 2–6
Winner	2.	6 June 2004	Wulanhaote, China	Hard	(Chinese Taipei) Chuang Chia-jung	(China) Du Rui (China) Liu Nannan	3–6, 6–2, 6–3
Winner	3.	4 December 2004	Bangkok, Thailand	Hard	(Uzbekistan) Akgul Amanmuradova	(Chinese Taipei) Hwang I-hsuan (Thailand) Nudnida Luangnam	6–4, 6–4
Runner-up	4.	16 May 2005	Ho Chi Minh City, Vietnam	Hard	(Uzbekistan) Akgul Amanmuradova	(Indonesia) Wynne Prakusya (Indonesia) Romana Tedjakusuma	4–6, 0–6
Winner	5.	28 May 2005	Phuket, Thailand	Hard	(Uzbekistan) Akgul Amanmuradova	(Germany) Annette Kolb (Australia) Monique Adamczak	6–1, 6–1
Runner-up	6.	20 September 2005	Albuquerque, United States	Hard	(Indonesia) Romana Tedjakusuma	(United States) Julie Ditty (Venezuela) Milagros Sequera	3–6, 7–6, 6–7
Winner	7.	21 May 2006	Ho Chi Minh City, Vietnam	Hard	(Chinese Taipei) Chuang Chia-jung	(Latvia) Līga Dekmeijere (Australia) Trudi Musgrave	4–6, 6–1, 6–0
Winner	8.	18 June 2006	Inchon, South Korea	Hard	(Chinese Taipei) Chuang Chia-jung	(South Korea) Yoo Mi (South Korea) Lee Jin-a	6–2, 6–4
Runner-up	9.	7 May 2007	Changwon, South Korea	Hard	(Indonesia) Romana Tedjakusuma	(Chinese Taipei) Chan Chin-wei (Chinese Taipei) Kao Shao-yuan	4–6, 4–6
Runner-up	10.	27 July 2007	Bangkok, Thailand	Hard	(Thailand) Noppawan Lertcheewakarn	(Thailand) Sophia Mulsap (Thailand) Varatchaya Wongteanchai	4–6, 6–4, 6–1
Winner	11.	17 May 2008	Bangkok, Thailand	Hard	(Thailand) Suchanun Viratprasert	(Uzbekistan) Dilyara Saidkhodjayeva (Uzbekistan) Albina Khabibulina	1–6, 7–6^{(3)}, [10–8]
Runner-up	12.	1 July 2013	Bangkok, Thailand	Hard	(Thailand) Suchanun Viratprasert	(China) Lu Jiaxiang (China) Lu Jiajing	4–6, 4–6
