= Si Yew Ming =

Malaysian tennis player

- Country (sports): Malaysia
- Born: 24 August 1979 (age 46) Johor, Malaysia
- Retired: 2013
- Plays: Right-handed
- Prize money: $28,246

Singles
- Career record: 5–9 (ATP Tour)
- Highest ranking: No. 804 (10 November 2003)

Doubles
- Career record: 3–9 (ATP Tour)
- Highest ranking: No. 606 (25 July 2005)
Medal record
Southeast Asian Games
| Bronze medal – third place | 2003 Ho Chi Minh City | Mixed doubles |
| Bronze medal – third place | 2003 Ho Chi Minh City | Team |

Si Yew Ming (born 24 August 1979) is a Malaysian former professional tennis player.

== Biography ==
Ming, who made his Davis Cup debut for Malaysia in 1999, studied in the United States in the early stage of his career, first at Cumberland College (Williamsburg, KY) and then Illinois State University. He played two seasons with the Illinois State tennis team (2000-01) and amassed 53 doubles wins. An Academic All-American, he graduated with a degree in computer science.

A regular Southeast Asian Games participant for Malaysia, Ming had his best performance in 2003 at the Ho Chi Minh City games, when he won bronze medals in the mixed doubles and team events.

While competing on professional tour, he featured mostly on the ITF Futures Circuit and was a Malaysian number one. He made an ATP Tour main draw appearance at the 2010 Proton Malaysian Open as a wildcard replacement for Lleyton Hewitt, who was a late injury withdrawal. In the first round he faced India's Yuki Bhambri and was beaten in straight sets. He never again made the singles main draw of the Malaysian Open, but by winning a qualifying match at the tournament in 2012 became the first Malaysian to win an ATP Tour match. He made three Malaysian Open main draw appearance in doubles, including in 2011 when he partnered with Ryan Harrison.

In 2013, he appeared in the Davis Cup for the last time, and retired after playing a record 45 matches for Malaysia. He also holds the Malaysian records for most singles wins (27) as well as most doubles wins (16).
