= Harshana Godamanna =

Sri Lankan tennis player

- Country (sports): Sri Lanka
- Born: 31 October 1985 (age 40) Colombo, Sri Lanka
- Plays: Left-handed (one-handed backhand)
- Prize money: $9,587

Singles
- Career record: 38-15 (ATP Tour and Grand Slam level, and in Davis Cup)
- Career titles: 0
- Highest ranking: No. 811 (27 October 2008)

Doubles
- Career record: 24-9 (ATP Tour and Grand Slam level, and in Davis Cup)
- Career titles: 0
- Highest ranking: No. 846 (27 October 2008)

Team competitions
- Davis Cup: G2
- Last updated on: 13 February 2017.

Harshana Godamanna (born 31 October 1985) is a Sri Lankan tennis player. Godamanna has regularly represented Sri Lanka in the Davis Cup since making his debut in 2002 against Jordan.

With a world ranking of #811 in 2008, Godamnana became the highest ranked tennis player in Sri Lankan history.

As of 2016, he currently holds the record for the most singles victories by any Sri Lankan player in Davis Cup history, twice leading the team to the Asia/Oceania Group II during his career.

Outside of the Davis Cup, Godamanna has also won an ITF doubles title, partnering with Bart Govaerts to win a 2007 Futures event in Pakistan.
