= V. Selvam =

Malaysian tennis player

- Full name: Selvam Veerasingam
- Country (sports): Malaysia
- Born: 11 August 1969 (age 57) Port Dickson, Malaysia

Singles
- Highest ranking: No. 424 (12 Dec 1994)

Doubles
- Highest ranking: No. 1170 (10 Jun 1996)
Medal record
Southeast Asian Games
Bronze medal – third place	1989 Kuala Lumpur	Men's singles
Bronze medal – third place	2001 Kuala Lumpur	Men's singles
Bronze medal – third place	2001 Kuala Lumpur	Mixed doubles

Selvam Veerasingam (born 11 August 1969), known as V. Selvam, is a Malaysian former professional tennis player. He now coaches and runs the DUTA International Tennis Academy in Kuala Lumpur.

Debuting in 1988, Selvam had a record 14-year Davis Cup career for Malaysia. He featured in a total of 35 ties, for 24 singles and 13 doubles wins. In addition to the Davis Cup he also represented his country in multiple editions of the Southeast Asian Games and won three bronze medals, two of which came in singles.

Selvam, who was trained by Nick Bollettieri, holds the highest ATP singles ranking for a Malaysian player, reaching 291 in the world in 1994. He made an ATP Tour main draw appearance at the 1995 Kuala Lumpur Open, where he lost his first round match in three sets to Paul Wekesa.

== Early life and background ==
Selvam Veerasingam was born and raised in Port Dickson, Negeri Sembilan, Malaysia. He began playing tennis at a young age and displayed exceptional talent and dedication to the sport. As a junior player, Veerasingam competed in numerous national and international tournaments, achieving notable results and garnering attention for his skills on the court.

== Professional career ==
=== Early career ===
- Youngest player to become Men's National No.1 at age 16

=== Notable achievements ===
==== National ====
Longest streak of being Men's National No.1 - 20 consecutive years

==== SEA Games ====
- Achieved 3 bronze medals in 1989 and 2001
- Malaysia has achieved only 3 medals in SEA Games History under the Men's Singles category - 2 of which is by Selvam

==== Davis Cup ====
- Malaysian Davis Cup History includes - Most Total Wins, Most Singles Wins, Most Doubles Wins, Most Years Played (14 Years)
