= Ngô Quang Huy (tennis) =

Vietnamese tennis player

- Country (sports): Vietnam
- Born: 10 March 1984 (age 41)
- Plays: Right-handed (two-handed backhand)

Singles
- Highest ranking: No. 1461 (11 Apr 2005)

Doubles
- Highest ranking: No. 693 (27 Feb 2006)
Medal record
Southeast Asian Games
Bronze medal – third place	2003 Ho Chi Minh City	Men's team
Bronze medal – third place	2005 Manila	Men's team
Bronze medal – third place	2007 Nakhon Ratchasima	Men's team
Bronze medal – third place	2011 Palembang	Men's doubles

Ngô Quang Huy (born 10 March 1984) is a former professional tennis player.

A member of the Vietnam Davis Cup team from 2003 to 2014, Ngô appeared in a total of 28 ties for his country and secured 13 wins. He also represented Vietnam in multiple editions of the Southeast Asian Games, where he won four bronze medals.

Ngô spent his professional career competing in ITF Futures tournaments across Asia, but made one ATP Tour main draw appearance, at the 2005 Ho Chi Minh City Open. He received a wildcard to partner Aljoscha Thron in the doubles event and the pair made it through to the quarter-finals.
