= Đỗ Minh Quân =

Vietnamese tennis player (born 1984)

- Country (sports): Vietnam
- Residence: Hanoi, Vietnam
- Born: 7 January 1984 (age 42) Ho Chi Minh City, Vietnam
- Height: 1.81 m (5 ft 11 in)
- Turned pro: 2002
- Retired: 2012
- Plays: Right-handed (two-handed backhand)
- Prize money: $117

Singles
- Career record: 38–51
- Highest ranking: No. 1002 (6 March 2006)

Doubles
- Career record: 30–36
- Highest ranking: No. 959 (10 July 2006)
Medal record
Men's Tennis
Representing Vietnam
Southeast Asian Games
Bronze medal – third place	2003 Vietnam	Doubles
Bronze medal – third place	2003 Vietnam	Team
Bronze medal – third place	2005 Manila	Team
Bronze medal – third place	2007 Nakhon Ratchasima	Doubles
Bronze medal – third place	2007 Nakhon Ratchasima	Team
Bronze medal – third place	2009 Vientiane	Team
Bronze medal – third place	2011 Jakarta-Palembang	Doubles
- Last updated on: 2 February 2018.

Đỗ Minh Quân (7 January 1984) is a retired Vietnamese tennis player. He won Vietnam Tennis Championship for ten times in singles and doubles. He has been part of the Vietnam Davis Cup team from 2003 until 2015.
