= Tennis at the 1999 SEA Games =

- Venue: Hassanal Bolkiah National Stadium Tennis Court, Bandar Seri Begawan
- Dates: 8–14 August 1999

Tennis at the 1999 SEA Games was held in Hassanal Bolkiah National Stadium Tennis Court, Bandar Seri Begawan, Brunei Darussalam from 8 to 14 August 1999 Tennis had team, doubles, and singles events for men and women, as well as a mixed doubles competition.

== Medalists ==
Event	Gold	Silver	Bronze
Men's team	Thailand (THA); Vittaya Samrej; Narathorn Srichaphan; Paradorn Srichaphan; Danai Udomchoke	Indonesia (INA); Yusmawan Fahmi; Hendri Susilo Pramono; Suwandi; Febi Widhiyanto	Philippines (PHI); Bryan Juinio; Joseph Lizardo; Michael John Misa; Dante Santa Cruz
Men's team	Thailand (THA); Vittaya Samrej; Narathorn Srichaphan; Paradorn Srichaphan; Danai Udomchoke	Indonesia (INA); Yusmawan Fahmi; Hendri Susilo Pramono; Suwandi; Febi Widhiyanto	Brunei (BRU); Cheong Nelson Anderson; Ibrahim Ak Ismasuflan; Lu On Sie; Wong Kee Hing Johnson
Women's team	Indonesia (INA); Liza Andriyani; Wynne Prakusya; Wukirasih Sawondari; Romana Tedjakusuma	Philippines (PHI); Czarina Mae Arevalo; Maricris Fernandez; Pamela Floro; Marisue Jacutin	Thailand (THA); Monthika Anuchan; Napaporn Tongsalee; Suchanun Viratprasert; Orawan Wongkamalasai
Women's team	Indonesia (INA); Liza Andriyani; Wynne Prakusya; Wukirasih Sawondari; Romana Tedjakusuma	Philippines (PHI); Czarina Mae Arevalo; Maricris Fernandez; Pamela Floro; Marisue Jacutin	Malaysia (MAS); Chiew Eline; Khoo Chin-bee; Lai Shareen; Tan Lynn Yin
Men's singles	Paradorn Srichaphan; Thailand	Bryan Juinio; Philippines	Danai Udomchoke; Thailand
Men's singles	Paradorn Srichaphan; Thailand	Bryan Juinio; Philippines	Suwandi; Indonesia
Women's singles	Maricris Fernandez; Philippines	Wynne Prakusya; Indonesia	Khoo Chin-bee; Malaysia
Women's singles	Maricris Fernandez; Philippines	Wynne Prakusya; Indonesia	Orawan Wongkamalasai; Thailand
Men's doubles	Thailand (THA); Narathorn Srichaphan; Paradorn Srichaphan	Thailand (THA); Danai Udomchoke; Vittaya Samrej	Indonesia (INA); Suwandi; Yusmawan Fahmi
Men's doubles	Thailand (THA); Narathorn Srichaphan; Paradorn Srichaphan	Thailand (THA); Danai Udomchoke; Vittaya Samrej	Indonesia (INA); Febi Widhiyanto; Hendri Susilo Pramono
Women's doubles	Indonesia (INA); Wynne Prakusya; Romana Tedjakusuma	Indonesia (INA); Liza Andriyani; Wukirasih Sawondari	Thailand (THA); Orawan Wongkamalasai; Monthika Anuchan
Women's doubles	Indonesia (INA); Wynne Prakusya; Romana Tedjakusuma	Indonesia (INA); Liza Andriyani; Wukirasih Sawondari	Thailand (THA); Napaporn Tongsalee; Suchanun Viratprasert
Mixed doubles	Thailand (THA); Vittaya Samrej; Orawan Wongkamalasai	Thailand (THA); Narathorn Srichaphan; Monthika Anuchan	Indonesia (INA); Suwandi; Wukirasih Sawondari
Mixed doubles	Thailand (THA); Vittaya Samrej; Orawan Wongkamalasai	Thailand (THA); Narathorn Srichaphan; Monthika Anuchan	Indonesia (INA); Hendri Susilo Pramono; Liza Andriyani

== Results ==
=== Men's team ===
Quarterfinals
1	Thailand (THA)	3
Vietnam (VIE)	0
Brunei (BRU)	2
Cambodia (CAM)	1
Singapore (SIN)	0
Philippines (PHI)	3
Malaysia (MAS)	0
2	Indonesia (INA)	3

Semifinals
1	Thailand (THA)	3
Brunei (BRU)	0
Philippines (PHI)	0
2	Indonesia (INA)	3

Final
1	Thailand (THA)	3
2	Indonesia (INA)	0

==== Quarterfinals ====
8 August	Thailand (THA)	3–0	Vietnam (VIE)

Danai Udomchoke	2–0	Truong Quoc Hung	6-1, 6-3
Paradorn Srichaphan	2–0	Tran Duc Quinh	6-1, 6-0
Vittaya Samrej / Narathorn Srichaphan	2–0	Dong Hang Anh / Tran Duc Quinh	6-1, 6-4

8 August	Brunei (BRU)	3–0	Cambodia (CAM)

On Sie Lu	2–0	Chan Ty	6-0, 6-1
Ibrahim Ak Ismasuflan	2–0	Rin Sopharano	6-3, 6-2
Cheong Nelson Anderson / Wong Kee Hing Johnson	1–2	Rin Sopharano / Chan Ty	6-3, 4-6, 6-7

8 August	Singapore (SIN)	0–3	Philippines (PHI)

Kho Tung Yi	0–2	Joseph Lizardo	1-6, 2-6
Chen Chee Yen	0–2	Bryan Juinio	5-7, 3-6
Yang Sian / Kho Tung Yi	0–2	Michael John Misa / Dante Santa Cruz	6-7, 4-6

8 August	Malaysia (MAS)	0–3	Indonesia (INA)

Si Yew Ming	0–2	Febi Widhiyanto	0-6, 0-6
V. Selvam	0–2	Suwandi	4-6, 5-7
Si Yew Ming / Ramayah Ramachandran	0–2	Hendri Susilo Pramono / Yusmawan Fahmi	4-6, 6-7 (6-8)

==== Semifinals ====
9 August	Thailand (THA)	3–0	Vietnam (VIE)

Danai Udomchoke	2–0	Lu On Sie	6-0, 6-1
Paradorn Srichaphan	2–0	Ibrahim Ak Ismasuflan	6-1, 6-0
Vittaya Samrej / Narathorn Srichaphan	2–0	Wong Kee Hing Johnson / Cheong Nelson Anderson	6-2, 6-0

9 August	Philippines (PHI)	0–3	Indonesia (INA)

Joseph Lizardo	0–2	Febi Widhiyanto	4-6, 0-6
Bryan Juinio	0–2	Suwandi	4-6, 3-6
Michael John Misa / Dante Santa Cruz	0–2	Hendri Susilo Pramono / Yusmawan Fahmi	4-6, 6-7 (2-7)

==== Final ====
10 August	Thailand (THA)	3–0	Indonesia (INA)

Danai Udomchoke	2–0	Febi Widhiyanto	7-6, 6-4
Paradorn Srichaphan	2–0	Suwandi	6-3, 6-2
Vittaya Samrej / Narathorn Srichaphan	2–0	Hendri Susilo Pramono / Febi Widhiyanto	6-3, 6-1

=== Women's team ===
Quarterfinals
Malaysia (MAS)	3
Vietnam (VIE)	0
Singapore (SIN)	0
Thailand (THA)	3
Brunei (BRU)	0
2	Philippines (PHI)	3

Semifinals
1	Indonesia (INA)	3
Malaysia (MAS)	0
Thailand (THA)	1
2	Philippines (PHI)	2

Final
1	Indonesia (INA)	2
2	Philippines (PHI)	1

==== Quarterfinals ====
8 August	Malaysia (MAS)	3–0	Vietnam (VIE)

8 August	Singapore (SIN)	0–3	Thailand (THA)

8 August	Brunei (BRU)	0–3	Philippines (PHI)

==== Semifinals ====
9 August	Indonesia (INA)	3–0	Malaysia (MAS)

Romana Tedjakusuma	2–0	Eline Chiew	6-1, 6-3
Wynne Prakusya	2–0	Khoo Chin-bee	6-4, 7-6 (7-1)
Liza Andriyani / Wukirasih Sawondari	2–0	Tan Lynn Yin / Lai Shareen Lena	6-2, 6-2

9 August	Thailand (THA)	1–2	Philippines (PHI)

Orawan Wongkamalasai	2–1	Marisue Jacutin	6-3 0-6 6-2
Suchanun Viratprasert	0–2	Maricris Fernandez	4-6 4-6
Monthika Anuchan / Orawan Wongkamalasai	Maricris Fernandez / Pamela Floro

==== Final ====
10 August	Indonesia (INA)	2–1	Philippines (PHI)

Romana Tedjakusuma	2–0	Marisue Jacutin	6-4, 6-0
Wynne Prakusya	0–2	Maricris Fernandez	1-6, 4-6
Romana Tedjakusuma / Wynne Prakusya	2–0	Pamela Floro / Maricris Fernandez	7-6 (7-2), 7-5

=== Men's singles ===
Round of 16; 10-11 August
1	Paradorn Srichaphan (THA)	6	6
Chan Thy (CAM)	1	0
Joseph Lizardo (PHI)	6	6
On Sie Lu (BRU)	1	1
3	Suwandi (INA)	6	6
Tran Duc Quynh (VIE)	1	3
V. Selvam (MAS)	6	6
Kho Tung Yi (SIN)	4	4
Si Yew Ming (MAS)	6	6
Ibrahim Ak Ismasuflan (BRU)	2	2
Do Thanh Hoang (VIE)	2	6	3
4	Bryan Juinio (PHI)	6	4	6
Febi Widhiyanto (INA)	6	6
Yang Sian (SIN)	0	1
Rin Sophanaro (CAM)	0	1
2	Danai Udomchoke (THA)	6	6

Quarterfinal; 12 August
1	Paradorn Srichaphan (THA)	6	6
Joseph Lizardo (PHI)	2	4
3	Suwandi (INA)	6	6
V. Selvam (MAS)	2	3
Si Yew Ming (MAS)	2	6
4	Bryan Juinio (PHI)	6	7
Febi Widhiyanto (INA)	3	6	5
2	Danai Udomchoke (THA)	6	2	7

Semifinal; 13 August
1	Paradorn Srichaphan (THA)	6	6
3	Suwandi (INA)	4	4
4	Bryan Juinio (PHI)	6	6
2	Danai Udomchoke (THA)	3	4

Final; 14 August
1	Paradorn Srichaphan (THA)	6	6
4	Bryan Juinio (PHI)	3	3

=== Women's singles ===
Round of 16; 10-11 August
1	Wynne Prakusya (INA)
Bye
Suchanun Viratprasert (THA)	6	6
Leow Yik Hui (SIN)	0	0
4	Khoo Chin-bee (MAS)	4	6
Thi Kim Trang (VIE)	6	1	(r)
Marisue Jacutin (PHI)	6	6
Salbiah Arawan (BRU)	0	1
Jaime Rui-jing (SIN)	6	6
Eline Chiew (MAS)	4	4
Tran Thuyet Minh (VIE)	2	0
3	Orawan Wongkamalasai (THA)	6	6
Romana Tedjakusuma (INA)	w/o
Tina Osman (BRU)
Bye
2	Maricris Fernandez (PHI)

Quarterfinal; 11-12 August
1	Wynne Prakusya (INA)	6	6
Suchanun Viratprasert (THA)	3	3
4	Khoo Chin-bee (MAS)	6	6
Marisue Jacutin (PHI)	2	0
Jaime Rui-jing (SIN)	3	3
3	Orawan Wongkamalasai (THA)	6	6
Romana Tedjakusuma (INA)	6^{2}	2
2	Maricris Fernandez (PHI)	7^{7}	6

Semifinal; 13 August
1	Wynne Prakusya (INA)	6	6
4	Khoo Chin-bee (MAS)	3	2
3	Orawan Wongkamalasai (THA)	1	3
2	Maricris Fernandez (PHI)	6	6

Final; 14 August
1	Wynne Prakusya (INA)	4	4
2	Maricris Fernandez (PHI)	6	6

=== Men's doubles ===
Round of 16; 10-11 August
1	Paradorn Srichaphan (THA); Narathorn Srichaphan (THA)
N/A
Kho Tung Yi (SIN); Yang Sian (SIN)	6	6
Rin Sophanaro (CAM); Chan Thy (CAM)	1	2
3	Febi Widhiyanto (INA); Hendri Susilo Pramono (INA)
N/A
Michael John Misa (PHI); Dante Santa Cruz (PHI)	6	3	6
Truong Quoc Hung (VIE); Tran Duc Quynh (VIE)	4	6	4
Do Thanh Hoang (VIE); Dong Hang Anh (VIE)
N/A
N/A
4	Suwandi (INA); Yusmawan Fahmi (INA)
N/A
V. Selvam (MAS); Ramayah Ramachandran (MAS)
N/A
2	Danai Udomchoke (THA); Vittaya Samrej (THA)

Quarterfinal; 12 August
1	Paradorn Srichaphan (THA); Narathorn Srichaphan (THA)	6	6
Kho Tung Yi (SIN); Yang Sian (SIN)	2	1
3	Febi Widhiyanto (INA); Hendri Susilo Pramono (INA)	6	6
Truong Quoc Hung (VIE); Tran Duc Quynh (VIE)	1	1
Do Thanh Hoang (VIE); Dong Hang Anh (VIE)	2	0
4	Suwandi (INA); Yusmawan Fahmi (INA)	6	6
V. Selvam (MAS); Ramayah Ramachandran (MAS)	4	2
2	Danai Udomchoke (THA); Vittaya Samrej (THA)	6	6

Semifinal; 13 August
1	Paradorn Srichaphan (THA); Narathorn Srichaphan (THA)	6	6
3	Febi Widhiyanto (INA); Hendri Susilo Pramono (INA)	4	4
4	Suwandi (INA); Yusmawan Fahmi (INA)	3	3
2	Danai Udomchoke (THA); Vittaya Samrej (THA)	6	6

Final; 14 August
1	Paradorn Srichaphan (THA); Narathorn Srichaphan (THA)	6	3	6
2	Danai Udomchoke (THA); Vittaya Samrej (THA)	2	6	3

=== Women's doubles ===
Round of 16; 10-11 August
1	Liza Andriyani (INA); Wukirasih Sawondari (INA)
N/A
N/A
N/A
3	Orawan Wongkamalasai (THA); Monthika Anuchan (THA)
N/A
Thi Trang Nguyen (VIE); Tran Nguyen Minh (VIE)	4	6	6
Tan Lynn Yinn (MAS); Shareen Rena Lai (MAS)	6	3	3
Suchanun Viratprasert (THA); Napaporn Tongsalee (THA)	6	6
Jaime Wong Rui-Jing (SIN); Leong Jil Lin (SIN)	1	0
N/A
4	Maricris Fernandez (PHI); Pamela Floro (PHI)
N/A
Khoo Chin-bee (MAS); Eline Chiew (MAS)
N/A
2	Wynne Prakusya (INA); Romana Tedjakusuma (INA)

Quarterfinal; 12 August
1	Liza Andriyani (INA); Wukirasih Sawondari (INA)
3	Orawan Wongkamalasai (THA); Monthika Anuchan (THA)
Suchanun Viratprasert (THA); Napaporn Tongsalee (THA)	1	6	6
4	Maricris Fernandez (PHI); Pamela Floro (PHI)	6	3	1
Khoo Chin-bee (MAS); Eline Chiew (MAS)	3	2
2	Wynne Prakusya (INA); Romana Tedjakusuma (INA)	6	6

Semifinal; 13 August
1	Liza Andriyani (INA); Wukirasih Sawondari (INA)	6	6
3	Orawan Wongkamalasai (THA); Monthika Anuchan (THA)	0	1
Suchanun Viratprasert (THA); Napaporn Tongsalee (THA)	2	3
2	Wynne Prakusya (INA); Romana Tedjakusuma (INA)	6	6

Final; 14 August
1	Liza Andriyani (INA); Wukirasih Sawondari (INA)	6	4	4
2	Wynne Prakusya (INA); Romana Tedjakusuma (INA)	2	6	6

=== Mixed doubles ===
Round of 16; 11 August
1	Suwandi (INA); Wukirasih Sawondari (INA)
N/A
Chen Chee Yen (SIN); Leong Jil Lin (SIN)
N/A
3	Narathorn Srichaphan (THA); Monthika Anuchan (THA)
N/A
V. Selvam (MAS); Khoo Chin-bee (MAS)	6	6
Dante Santa Cruz (PHI); Pamela Floro (PHI)	3	4
N/A
Kho Tung Yi (SIN); Jaime Wong Rui-Jing (SIN)
N/A
3	Vittaya Samrej (THA); Orawan Wongkamalasai (THA)
N/A
Michael John Misa (PHI); Maricris Fernandez (PHI)
N/A
2	Hendri Susilo Pramono (INA); Liza Andriyani (INA)

Quarterfinal; 12 August
1	Suwandi (INA); Wukirasih Sawondari (INA)	6	6
Chen Chee Yen (SIN); Leong Jil Lin (SIN)	2	0
3	Narathorn Srichaphan (THA); Monthika Anuchan (THA)	6	7
V. Selvam (MAS); Khoo Chin-bee (MAS)	3	5
Kho Tung Yi (SIN); Jaime Wong Rui-Jing (SIN)	3	2
3	Vittaya Samrej (THA); Orawan Wongkamalasai (THA)	6	6
Michael John Misa (PHI); Maricris Fernandez (PHI)	5	6	5
2	Hendri Susilo Pramono (INA); Liza Andriyani (INA)	7	3	7

Semifinal; 13 August
1	Suwandi (INA); Wukirasih Sawondari (INA)	6	6^{3}	2
4	Narathorn Srichaphan (THA); Monthika Anuchan (THA)	2	7^{7}	6
3	Vittaya Samrej (THA); Orawan Wongkamalasai (THA)	6	6
2	Hendri Susilo Pramono (INA); Liza Andriyani (INA)	3	4

Final; 14 August
4	Narathorn Srichaphan (THA); Monthika Anuchan (THA)	6^{5}	3
3	Vittaya Samrej (THA); Orawan Wongkamalasai (THA)	7^{7}	6

== Medal table ==
Legend

* Host nation (Brunei)

Rank	Nation	Gold	Silver	Bronze	Total
1	Thailand	4	2	5	11
2	Indonesia	2	3	5	10
3	Philippines	1	2	1	4
4	Malaysia	0	0	2	2
5	Brunei*	0	0	1	1
Totals (5 entries)		7	7	14	28
