= 1999 Davis Cup Asia/Oceania Zone Group II =

International tennis competition

The Asia/Oceania Zone was one of the three zones of the regional Davis Cup competition in 1999.

In the Asia/Oceania Zone there were four different tiers, called groups, in which teams compete against each other to advance to the upper tier. Winners in Group II advanced to the Asia/Oceania Zone Group I. Teams who lost their respective ties competed in the relegation play-offs, with winning teams remaining in Group II, whereas teams who lost their play-offs were relegated to the Asia/Oceania Zone Group III in 2000.

== Participating nations ==
- Chinese Taipei
- Indonesia
- Iran
- Kazakhstan
- Philippines
- Qatar
- Sri Lanka
- Thailand

=== Draw ===
Relegation Play-offs
Kaohsiung, Taiwan (clay)
Qatar	0
Chinese Taipei	5
Almaty, Kazakhstan (indoor hard)
Sri Lanka	1
Kazakhstan	4

First Round
Doha, Qatar (hard)
Indonesia	5
Qatar	0
Manila, Philippines (hard)
Chinese Taipei	2
Philippines	3
Colombo, Sri Lanka (clay)
Iran	3
Sri Lanka	2
Nonthaburi, Thailand (hard)
Kazakhstan	0
Thailand	5

Second Round
Jakarta, Indonesia (indoor hard)
Indonesia
Philippines
Tehran, Iran (clay)
Iran	0
Thailand	5

Third Round
Nonthaburi, Thailand (hard)
Philippines	1
Thailand	4

- Qatar and Sri Lanka relegated to Group III in 2000.
- Thailand promoted to Group I in 2000.

== First round ==
=== Qatar vs. Indonesia ===
Qatar
0
Khalifa International Tennis and Squash Complex, Doha, Qatar
12–14 February 1999
Hard

Indonesia
5

			1	2	3	4	5
1	(Qatar) (Indonesia)	Nasser Al-Khelaifi; Suwandi Suwandi	4; 6	3; 6	3; 6
2	(Qatar) (Indonesia)	Sultan Al-Alawi; Febi Widhiyanto	4; 6	0; 6	3; 6
3	(Qatar) (Indonesia)	Sultan Al-Alawi / Nasser Al-Khelaifi; Edi Kusdaryanto / Hendri Susilo Pramono	0; 6	2; 6	2; 6
4	(Qatar) (Indonesia)	Mubarak Al-Tobaishi; Suwandi Suwandi	1; 6	4; 6
5	(Qatar) (Indonesia)	Nasser Al-Khelaifi; Febi Widhiyanto	4; 6	1; 6

=== Philippines vs. Chinese Taipei ===
Philippines
3
Rizal Memorial Sports Complex, Manila, Philippines
12–14 February 1999
Hard

Chinese Taipei
2

			1	2	3	4	5
1	(Philippines) (Chinese Taipei)	Bryan Juinio; Lin Bing-chao	3; 6	2; 6	7^{7} 6^{5}	6; 1	4; 6
2	(Philippines) (Chinese Taipei)	Joseph Lizardo; Cheng Wei-jen	4; 6	6; 3	6; 3	3; 6	7; 5
3	(Philippines) (Chinese Taipei)	Joseph Lizardo / Michael-John Misa; Chen Chih-jung / Lin Bing-chao	5; 7	4; 6	1; 6
4	(Philippines) (Chinese Taipei)	Joseph Lizardo; Lin Bing-chao	6; 4	6; 3	6; 3
5	(Philippines) (Chinese Taipei)	Bryan Juinio; Tsai Chia-yen	6; 2	6; 2	6; 2

=== Sri Lanka vs. Iran ===
Sri Lanka
2
National Centre, Colombo, Sri Lanka
12–14 February 1999
Clay

Iran
3

			1	2	3	4	5
1	(Sri Lanka) (Iran)	Jayendra Wijeyesekera; Seyed Akbar Taheri Rahaghi	3; 6	6; 4	1; 6	7; 5	0; 6
2	(Sri Lanka) (Iran)	Rohan de Silva; Mohammed-Reza Tavakoli	1; 6	6^{5} 7^{7}	0; 6
3	(Sri Lanka) (Iran)	Rohan de Silva / Jayendra Wijeyesekera; Seyed Akbar Taheri Rahaghi / Mohammed-Reza Tavakoli	6; 4	7^{7} 6^{3}	5; 7	2; 6	3; 6
4	(Sri Lanka) (Iran)	Renouk Wijemanne; Iman Nilipour	7; 5	6; 1
5	(Sri Lanka) (Iran)	Asiri Iddamalgoda; Anoosha Shahgholi	6; 1	1; 6	7^{7} 6^{4}

=== Thailand vs. Kazakhstan ===
Thailand
5
Muang Thong Thani, Nonthaburi, Thailand
12–14 February 1999
Hard

Kazakhstan
0

			1	2	3	4	5
1	(Thailand) (Kazakhstan)	Paradorn Srichaphan; Pavel Baranov	6; 1	6; 3	6; 2
2	(Thailand) (Kazakhstan)	Danai Udomchoke; Alexey Kedryuk	3; 6	7^{7} 6^{5}	6; 4	5; 7	7; 5
3	(Thailand) (Kazakhstan)	Vittaya Samrej / Narathorn Srichaphan; Pavel Baranov / Alexey Kedryuk	6; 3	6; 2	6; 1
4	(Thailand) (Kazakhstan)	Narathorn Srichaphan; Alexey Kedryuk	6; 1	6; 2
5	(Thailand) (Kazakhstan)	Danai Udomchoke; Pavel Baranov	6; 4	6; 0

== Second round ==
=== Indonesia vs. Philippines ===
Indonesia
1
Gelora Bung Karno Sports Complex, Jakarta, Indonesia
2–4 April 1999
Hard (indoors)

Philippines
4

			1	2	3	4	5
1	(Indonesia) (Philippines)	Febi Widhiyanto; Bryan Juinio	6^{2} 7^{7}	1; 6	5; 7
2	(Indonesia) (Philippines)	Suwandi Suwandi; Joseph Lizardo	6^{4} 7^{7}	2; 6	6; 4	2; 6
3	(Indonesia) (Philippines)	Edi Kusdaryanto / Hendri Susilo Pramono; Adelo Abadia / Michael-John Misa	6; 4	7^{7} 6^{5}	7^{8} 6^{6}
4	(Indonesia) (Philippines)	Febi Widhiyanto; Joseph Lizardo	6; 4	4; 6	2; 6	6; 2	2; 6
5	(Indonesia) (Philippines)	Suwandi Suwandi; Bryan Juinio	4; 6	6^{10} 7^{12}

=== Iran vs. Thailand ===
Iran
0
Enghelab Sport Complex, Tehran, Iran
16–18 April 1999
Clay

Thailand
5

			1	2	3	4	5
1	(Iran) (Thailand)	Mohammed-Reza Tavakoli; Danai Udomchoke	1; 6	3; 6	2; 6
2	(Iran) (Thailand)	Ramin Raziani; Narathorn Srichaphan	2; 6	4; 6	2; 6
3	(Iran) (Thailand)	Ramin Raziani / Seyed Akbar Taheri Rahaghi; Vittaya Samrej / Narathorn Srichaphan	4; 6	6; 4	1; 6	6; 4	4; 6
4	(Iran) (Thailand)	Anoosha Shahgholi; Danai Udomchoke	4; 6	6; 4	4; 6
5	(Iran) (Thailand)	Seyed Akbar Taheri Rahaghi; Narathorn Srichaphan	4; 6	4; 6

== Relegation play-offs ==
=== Chinese Taipei vs. Qatar ===
Chinese Taipei
5
Chung-Shan Tennis Centre, Kaohsiung, Taiwan
2–4 April 1999
Clay

Qatar
0

			1	2	3	4	5
1	(Chinese Taipei) (Qatar)	Cheng Wei-jen; Sultan Al-Alawi	6; 3	6; 0	6; 4
2	(Chinese Taipei) (Qatar)	Lin Bing-chao; Nasser Al-Khelaifi	6; 0	6; 0	6; 0
3	(Chinese Taipei) (Qatar)	Chen Chih-jung / Lin Bing-chao; Sultan Al-Alawi / Mubarak Al-Tobaishi	6; 3	6; 1	6; 0
4	(Chinese Taipei) (Qatar)	Lin Bing-chao; Sultan Al-Alawi	6; 0	6; 0
5	(Chinese Taipei) (Qatar)	Tsai Chia-yen; Nasser Al-Khelaifi	6; 2	6; 2

=== Kazakhstan vs. Sri Lanka ===
Kazakhstan
4
International Club, Almaty, Kazakhstan
2–4 April 1999
Hard (indoors)

Sri Lanka
1

			1	2	3	4	5
1	(Kazakhstan) (Sri Lanka)	Alexey Kedryuk; Asiri Iddamalgoda	6; 3	3; 6	6; 0	6; 4
2	(Kazakhstan) (Sri Lanka)	Pavel Baranov; Jayendra Wijeyesekera	5; 7	4; 6	6; 4	6; 1	6; 1
3	(Kazakhstan) (Sri Lanka)	Pavel Baranov / Alexey Kedryuk; Asiri Iddamalgoda / Jayendra Wijeyesekera	6^{4} 7^{7}	6; 3	6; 4	6; 2
4	(Kazakhstan) (Sri Lanka)	Alexey Kedryuk; Jayendra Wijeyesekera	6; 4	6; 3
5	(Kazakhstan) (Sri Lanka)	Dias Doskarayev; Asiri Iddamalgoda	7; 5	5; 7	4; 6

== Third round ==
=== Thailand vs. Philippines ===
Thailand
4
National Centre, Nonthaburi, Thailand
24–26 September 1999
Hard

Philippines
1

			1	2	3	4	5
1	(Thailand) (Philippines)	Danai Udomchoke; Bryan Juinio	4; 6	6^{6} 7^{8}	6^{8} 7^{10}
2	(Thailand) (Philippines)	Paradorn Srichaphan; Joseph Lizardo	6^{3} 7^{7}	6; 3	6; 2	7^{12} 6^{10}
3	(Thailand) (Philippines)	Narathorn Srichaphan / Paradorn Srichaphan; Joseph Lizardo / Michael-John Misa	6; 4	6; 3	6; 1
4	(Thailand) (Philippines)	Paradorn Srichaphan; Bryan Juinio	3; 6	6; 3	6; 2	6^{6} 7^{8}	6; 3
5	(Thailand) (Philippines)	Danai Udomchoke; Joseph Lizardo	6; 0	6; 3
