= 2002 Davis Cup Asia/Oceania Zone Group I =

International tennis competition

The Asia/Oceania Zone was one of the three zones of the regional Davis Cup competition in 2002.

In the Asia/Oceania Zone there were four different tiers, called groups, in which teams competed against each other to advance to the upper tier. Winners in Group I advanced to the World Group qualifying round, along with losing teams from the World Group first round. Teams who lost their respective ties competed in the relegation play-offs, with winning teams remaining in Group I, whereas teams who lost their play-offs were relegated to the Asia/Oceania Zone Group II in 2003.

== Participating nations ==
- India
- Indonesia
- Japan
- Lebanon
- New Zealand
- South Korea
- Thailand
- Uzbekistan

=== Draw ===
Second Round Play-offs
Jounieh, Lebanon (clay)
South Korea	5
Lebanon	0

First Round Play-offs
Tashkent, Uzbekistan (indoor hard)
Uzbekistan	4
South Korea	1
Surabaya, Indonesia (hard)
Indonesia	4
Lebanon	1

First Round
Bangkok, Thailand (hard)
Uzbekistan	2
Thailand	3
Gunsan, South Korea (indoor carpet)
Japan	3
South Korea	2
Invercargill, New Zealand (indoor carpet)
Indonesia	2
New Zealand	3
Beirut, Lebanon (indoor hard)
Lebanon	0
India	5

Second Round
Bangkok, Thailand (hard)
Thailand	4
Japan	1
Wellington, New Zealand (hard)
New Zealand	1
India	4

- Lebanon relegated to Group II in 2003.
- India and Thailand advance to World Group qualifying round.

== First round ==
=== Thailand vs. Uzbekistan ===
Thailand
3
Bangkok, Thailand
8–10 February 2002
Hard

Uzbekistan
2

			1	2	3	4	5
1	(Thailand) (Uzbekistan)	Danai Udomchoke; Oleg Ogorodov	6; 3	5; 7	6; 2	4; 6	6; 3
2	(Thailand) (Uzbekistan)	Paradorn Srichaphan; Vadim Kutsenko	6; 4	4; 6	6; 2	4; 6	6; 3
3	(Thailand) (Uzbekistan)	Vittaya Samrej / Narathorn Srichaphan; Vadim Kutsenko / Oleg Ogorodov	7^{7} 6^{3}	4; 6	4; 6	4; 6
4	(Thailand) (Uzbekistan)	Paradorn Srichaphan; Oleg Ogorodov	7^{7} 6^{0}	2; 6	1; 6	7; 5	6; 4
5	(Thailand) (Uzbekistan)	Narathorn Srichaphan; Vadim Kutsenko	4; 6	7^{7} 6^{3}	2; 6

=== South Korea vs. Japan ===
South Korea
2
Gunsan, South Korea
8–10 February 2002
Carpet (indoors)

Japan
3

			1	2	3	4	5
1	(South Korea) (Japan)	Yoon Yong-il; Takao Suzuki	5; 7	4; 6	3; 6
2	(South Korea) (Japan)	Lee Hyung-taik; Gouichi Motomura	6; 3	6; 4	6; 1
3	(South Korea) (Japan)	Chung Hee-seok / Lee Hyung-taik; Thomas Shimada / Takao Suzuki	6; 4	6^{3} 7^{7}	3; 6	7; 5	6; 1
4	(South Korea) (Japan)	Lee Hyung-taik; Takao Suzuki	6^{4} 7^{7}	5; 7	1; 6
5	(South Korea) (Japan)	Yoon Yong-il; Gouichi Motomura	6; 3	2; 6	2; 6	3; 6

=== New Zealand vs. Indonesia ===
New Zealand
3
Invercargill, New Zealand
8–10 February 2002
Carpet (indoors)

Indonesia
2

			1	2	3	4	5
1	(New Zealand) (Indonesia)	Mark Nielsen; Peter Handoyo	6; 2	5; 7	3; 6	4; 6
2	(New Zealand) (Indonesia)	Alistair Hunt; Suwandi Suwandi	4; 6	7; 5	4; 6	6; 2	6; 3
3	(New Zealand) (Indonesia)	Alistair Hunt / Mark Nielsen; Hendri-Susilo Pramono / Febi Widhiyanto	6; 1	6; 4	3; 6	6; 4
4	(New Zealand) (Indonesia)	Mark Nielsen; Suwandi Suwandi	6; 1	6; 4	3; 6	6; 3
5	(New Zealand) (Indonesia)	Daniel Willman; Peter Handoyo	5; 7	3; 6

=== Lebanon vs. India ===
Lebanon
0
Beirut, Lebanon
8–10 February 2002
Hard (indoors)

India
5

			1	2	3	4	5
1	(Lebanon) (India)	Karim Alayli; Leander Paes	3; 6	0; 6	0; 6
2	(Lebanon) (India)	Ali Hamadeh; Harsh Mankad	3; 6	1; 6	1; 6
3	(Lebanon) (India)	Patrick Chucri / Ali Hamadeh; Mahesh Bhupathi / Leander Paes	2; 6	1; 6	3; 6
4	(Lebanon) (India)	Patrick Chucri; Leander Paes	2; 6	2; 6
5	(Lebanon) (India)	Karim Alayli; Harsh Mankad	3; 6	1; 6

== Second round ==
=== Thailand vs. Japan ===
Thailand
4
Muang-Thong-Thani Complex, Bangkok, Thailand
5–7 April 2002
Hard

India
1

			1	2	3	4	5
1	(Thailand) (India)	Paradorn Srichaphan; Gouichi Motomura	3; 6	6^{3} 7^{7}	1; 6
2	(Thailand) (India)	Danai Udomchoke; Takao Suzuki	6; 2	3; 6	7; 5	5; 2		retired
3	(Thailand) (India)	Vittaya Samrej / Narathorn Srichaphan; Thomas Shimada / Takahiro Terachi	1; 6	2; 6	6; 4	3; 2		retired
4	(Thailand) (India)	Paradorn Srichaphan; Takao Suzuki	6; 2	6; 4	6; 2
5	(Thailand) (India)	Danai Udomchoke; Gouichi Motomura	7; 5	6; 2

=== New Zealand vs. India ===
New Zealand
1
Renouf Centre, Wellington, New Zealand
5–7 April 2002
Hard

India
4

			1	2	3	4	5
1	(New Zealand) (India)	Mark Nielsen; Harsh Mankad	6; 4	6; 0	6; 1
2	(New Zealand) (India)	Alistair Hunt; Leander Paes	3; 6	4; 6	4; 6
3	(New Zealand) (India)	James Shortall / Daniel Willman; Mahesh Bhupathi / Leander Paes	4; 6	3; 6	4; 6
4	(New Zealand) (India)	Mark Nielsen; Leander Paes	4; 6	3; 6	6; 4	6; 2	1; 6
5	(New Zealand) (India)	James Shortall; Harsh Mankad	5; 7	3; 6

== First round relegation play-offs ==
=== Uzbekistan vs. South Korea ===
Uzbekistan
4
Yunus-Abad Tennis Complex, Tashkent, Uzbekistan
5–7 April 2002
Hard (indoors)

South Korea
1

			1	2	3	4	5
1	(Uzbekistan) (South Korea)	Vadim Kutsenko; Chung Hee-seok	2; 6	4; 6	6; 4	1; 6
2	(Uzbekistan) (South Korea)	Oleg Ogorodov; Baek Seung-bok	6; 1	6; 3	6; 1
3	(Uzbekistan) (South Korea)	Vadim Kutsenko / Oleg Ogorodov; Chung Hee-seok / Kim Dong-hyun	6; 4	3; 6	6; 2	4; 6	6; 3
4	(Uzbekistan) (South Korea)	Oleg Ogorodov; Chung Hee-seok	6^{2} 7^{7}	6; 4	6; 0	6; 2
5	(Uzbekistan) (South Korea)	Vadim Kutsenko; Baek Seung-bok	7^{7} 6^{4}	6; 4

=== Indonesia vs. Lebanon ===
Indonesia
4
Pores Embong Sawo, Surabaya, Indonesia
5–7 April 2002
Hard

Lebanon
1

			1	2	3	4	5
1	(Indonesia) (Lebanon)	Suwandi Suwandi; Patrick Chucri	6; 2	6; 2	6; 4
2	(Indonesia) (Lebanon)	Febi Widhiyanto; Ali Hamadeh	6; 4	6; 1	6; 0
3	(Indonesia) (Lebanon)	Hendri-Susilo Pramono / Bonit Wiryawan; Patrick Chucri / Ali Hamadeh	7; 5	7^{9} 6^{7}	6; 4
4	(Indonesia) (Lebanon)	Suwandi Suwandi; Fadi Youssef	6; 0	6; 0
5	(Indonesia) (Lebanon)	Febi Widhiyanto; Patrick Chucri	2; 6	6^{5} 7^{7}

== Second round relegation play-offs ==
=== Lebanon vs. South Korea ===
Lebanon
0
A.T.C.L., Jounieh, Lebanon
20–22 September 2002
Clay

South Korea
5

			1	2	3	4	5
1	(Lebanon) (South Korea)	Sean Karam; Kim Dong-hyun	1; 6	1; 6	1; 6
2	(Lebanon) (South Korea)	Karim Alayli; Chung Hee-seok	2; 6	1; 6	3; 6
3	(Lebanon) (South Korea)	Patrick Chucri / Sean Karam; Chung Hee-seok / Chung Hee-sung	2; 6	2; 6	2; 6
4	(Lebanon) (South Korea)	Karim Alayli; Kim Dong-hyun	6^{1} 7^{7}	1; 6
5	(Lebanon) (South Korea)	Patrick Chucri; Kwon Oh-hee	3; 6	3; 6
