= Philippines at the 1999 SEA Games =

Philippines at the 1999 Southeast Asian Games
- IOC code: PHI
- NOC: Philippine Olympic Committee
- Website: www.olympic.ph (in English)

in Bandar Seri Begawan
- Medals Ranked 5th: Gold 19 Silver 27 Bronze 41 Total 87

Southeast Asian Games appearances (overview)
- 1977; 1979; 1981; 1983; 1985; 1987; 1989; 1991; 1993; 1995; 1997; 1999; 2001; 2003; 2005; 2007; 2009; 2011; 2013; 2015; 2017; 2019; 2021; 2023; 2025; 2027; 2029

The Philippines participated at the 20th Southeast Asian Games held in Brunei from 7 to 15 August 1999.

== SEA Games performance ==
The Philippines fell to fifth place in the overall medal tally, their lowest finish since joining the SEA Games in 1977. The Filipinos failed to win a gold medal in swimming for the first time, returning with a single gold in athletics. A harvest of four golds came from Taekwondo and Billiards. The Filipinos picked up two golds each in boxing, golf and shooting. World pool champion Efren 'Bata' Reyes and golfer Gerald Rosales were the only Filipino double gold medalists in the 1999 edition of the Games.

The Manila Metrostars of the ABS-CBN-funded Metropolitan Basketball Association (MBA) represented the Philippines for their basketball campaign. The Nationals captured their fifth straight basketball gold, defeating main rival Thailand, 89–69.

Philippine Olympic Committee president Celso Dayrit announced a four-year intensive elite sports development plan which the POC will undertake.

== Medalists ==
=== Gold ===
No.	Medal	Name	Sport	Event	Date
1	Gold	Elma Muros	Athletics	Women's long jump	8 August
2	Gold	Arianne Cerdeña	Bowling	Women's singles	8 August
3	Gold	Rodolfo Luat; Gandy Valle; Romeo Villanueva; Lee Vann Corteza	Billiards	Men's 9-ball team	8 August
4	Gold	Alessandro Lubiano	Taekwondo	Men's welterweight	8 August
5	Gold	Efren Reyes	Billiards	Men's rotation singles	9 August
6	Gold	Roberto Cruz	Taekwondo	Men's finweight	10 August
7	Gold	Donald Geisler	Taekwondo	Men's featherweight	10 August
8	Gold	Mary Nable	Karate	Women's open	11 August
9	Gold	Jeferthom Go	Taekwondo	Men's bantamweight	11 August
10	Gold	Efren Reyes; Warren Kiamco	Billiards	Men's rotation doubles	12 August
11	Gold	Gerald Rosales	Golf	Men's individual	12 August
12	Gold	Philippines	Golf	Men's team	12 August
13	Gold	Patricio Bernardo	Shooting	Men's individual skeet	12 August
14	Gold	Philippines	Shooting	Men's team trap	12 August
15	Gold	Juanito Magliquian	Boxing	Men's pinweight	14 August
16	Gold	Romeo Brin	Boxing	Men's light welterweight	14 August
17	Gold	Maricris Fernandez	Tennis	Women's singles	14 August
18	Gold	Philippines	Basketball	Men's	15 August
19	Gold	Lee Vann Corteza	Billiards	Men's 9-ball pool individual	15 August

=== Silver ===
No.	Medal	Name	Sport	Event	Date
1	Silver	Eduardo Buenavista	Athletics	Men's 3000 metres steeplechase	8 August
2	Silver	Lizza Danila	Swimming	Women's 200m backstroke	8 August
3	Silver	Margarita Bonifacio	Taekwondo	Women's middleweight	8 August
4	Silver	Joebert Delicano	Athletics	Men's long jump	9 August
5	Silver	Warren Kiamco	Billiards	Men's rotation singles	9 August
6	Silver	Maricar Primando	Karate	Women's kumite 60kg	9 August
7	Silver	Kathy Echeverri	Swimming	Women's 100m breaststroke	9 August
8	Silver	Rodolfo Abratique	Taekwondo	Men's flyweight	9 August
9	Silver	Kalindi Tamayo	Taekwondo	Women's flyweight	9 August
10	Silver	John Lozada	Athletics	Men's 1500 m	10 August
11	Silver	Jose Enrique Azarcon	Karate	Men's kumite 65kg	10 August
12	Silver	Carmela Albino	Taekwondo	Women's featherweight	10 August
13	Silver	Czarina Arevalo; Maricris Fernandez; Pamela Floro; Marisue Jacutin	Tennis	Women's team	10 August
14	Silver	John Lozada	Athletics	Men's 800 m	11 August
15	Silver	Emerson Obiena	Athletics	Men's pole vault	11 August
16	Silver	Elma Muros	Athletics	Heptathlon	11 August
17	Silver	Walter Gozum	Karate	Men's 55kg	11 August
18	Silver	Carlo Piccio	Swimming	Men's 1500m freestyle	11 August
19	Silver	Philippines	Shooting	Men's team skeet	12 August
20	Silver	Jaime Recio	Shooting	Men's individual trap	12 August
21	Silver	Philippines	Water Polo	Men's team	12 August
22	Silver	Arlan Lerio	Boxing	Men's flyweight	14 August
23	Silver	Elmer Pamisa	Boxing	Men's featherweight	14 August
24	Silver	Mario Tizon	Boxing	Men's middleweight	14 August
25	Silver	Bryan Juinio	Tennis	Men's singles	14 August
26	Silver	Leonardo Andam	Billiards	Men's 9-ball pool individual	15 August

=== Bronze ===
No.	Medal	Name	Sport	Event	Date
1	Bronze	Lerma Bulauitan	Athletics	Women's long jump	8 August
2	Bronze	Ernesto Gatchalian	Bowling	Men's singles	8 August
3	Bronze	Victor Espiritu	Cycling	Men's time trial	8 August
4	Bronze	Philippines	Karate	Men's team kumite	8 August
5	Bronze	Richard Lim	Karate	Men's individual kata	8 August
6	Bronze	Philippines	Karate	Women's team kumite	8 August
7	Bronze	Armi Barbara Yap	Karate	Women's individual kata	8 August
8	Bronze	Dindo Simpao	Taekwondo	Men's welterweight	8 August
9	Bronze	Sally Solis	Taekwondo	Women's welterweight	8 August
10	Bronze	Fidel Gallenero	Athletics	Decathlon	9 August
11	Bronze	Marlon Manalo	Billiards	Men's snooker singles	9 August
12	Bronze	Philippines	Billiards	Men's snooker team	9 August
13	Bronze	Ericson Fermin	Karate	Men's kumite 75kg	9 August
14	Bronze	Shelly Vivit; Angelica Starlight Rivera	Pencak silat	Women's wirasanggha	9 August
15	Bronze	Jaime Recio; George Earnshaw; Edgardo Flores	Shooting	Men's double trap	9 August
16	Bronze	Alvin Taraya	Taekwondo	Men's lightweight	9 August
17	Bronze	Veronica Domingo	Taekwondo	Women's lightweight	9 August
18	Bronze	Bryan Juinio; Joseph Lizardo; Michael John Misa; Dante Santa Cruz	Tennis	Men's team	10 August
19	Bronze	Sean Guevarra	Athletics	Men's high jump	10 August
20	Bronze	Gandy Valle; Romeo Villanueva	Billiards	Men's 9-ball pool doubles	10 August
21	Bronze	Cherli Tugday	Karate	Women's kumite 53kg	10 August
22	Bronze	Philippines	Pencak silat	Men's double play	10 August
23	Bronze	Lizza Danila	Swimming	Women's 100m backstroke	10 August
24	Bronze	Eva Marie Ditan	Taekwondo	Women's finweight	10 August
25	Bronze	Eduardo Buenavista	Athletics	Men's 5000m	11 August
26	Bronze	Philippines	Athletics	Men's 4 x 400m	11 August
27	Bronze	Junie Tizon	Boxing	Men's light middleweight	11 August
28	Bronze	Ernesto Coronel	Boxing	Men's heavyweight	11 August
29	Bronze	Ryan Mariano	Karate	Men's open	11 August
30	Bronze	Gerard Pingoy	Taekwondo	Men's heavyweight	11 August
31	Bronze	Philippines	Traditional boat race	Women's 12-crew 800m	11 August
32	Bronze	Jessie Flores	Boxing	Men's welterweight	12 August
33	Bronze	Norberto Oconer	Cycling	Men's 80km criterium	12 August
34	Bronze	Philippines	Shooting	Women's double trap team	12 August
35	Bronze	Ricardo Caberte	Pencak silat	Men's Class J	13 August
36	Bronze	Evangeline Caguioa	Pencak silat	Women's Class E	13 August
37	Bronze	Philippines	Squash	Men's team	15 August
38	Bronze	Richard Gonzales	Table Tennis	Men's singles	15 August

=== Multiple ===
Name	Sport	1st place, gold medalist(s)	2nd place, silver medalist(s)	3rd place, bronze medalist(s)	Total
Maricris Fernandez	Tennis	1	1	0	2
Lizza Danila	Swimming	0	1	1	2
Bryan Juinio	Tennis	0	1	1	2

== Medal summary ==
=== By sports ===
Sport	Gold	Silver	Bronze	Total
Taekwondo	4	4	6	14
Billiards and snooker	4	2	1	7
Boxing	2	3	3	8
Shooting	2	2	1	5
Golf	2	0	0	2
Athletics	1	6	5	12
Karate	1	2	7	10
Tennis	1	2	1	4
Bowling	1	0	1	2
Basketball	1	0	0	1
Swimming	0	3	1	4
Water polo	0	1	0	1
Cycling	0	0	2	2
Pencak silat	0	0	2	2
Squash	0	0	1	1
Table tennis	0	0	1	1
Traditional boat race	0	0	0	0
Totals (17 entries)	19	25	32	76
