= 1998 Davis Cup Asia/Oceania Zone Group II =

International tennis competition

The Asia/Oceania Zone was one of the three zones of the regional Davis Cup competition in 1998.

In the Asia/Oceania Zone there were four different tiers, called groups, in which teams compete against each other to advance to the upper tier. Winners in Group II advanced to the Asia/Oceania Zone Group I. Teams who lost their respective ties competed in the relegation play-offs, with winning teams remaining in Group II, whereas teams who lost their play-offs were relegated to the Asia/Oceania Zone Group III in 1999.

== Participating nations ==
- Chinese Taipei
- Hong Kong
- Iran
- Pakistan
- Philippines
- Pacific Oceania
- Qatar
- Thailand

=== Draw ===
Relegation Play-offs
Causeway Bay, Hong Kong (hard)
Philippines	4
Hong Kong	1
Doha, Qatar (hard)
Pacific Oceania	1
Qatar	4

First Round
Manila, Philippines (indoor clay)
Philippines	1
Thailand	4
Yilan, Taiwan (indoor carpet)
Hong Kong	2
Chinese Taipei	3
Islamabad, Pakistan (clay)
Pakistan	5
Pacific Oceania	0
Tehran, Iran (indoor clay)
Qatar	0
Iran	5

Second Round
Pattaya, Thailand (hard)
Thailand	3
Chinese Taipei	2
Tehran, Iran (clay)
Pakistan	4
Iran	1

Third Round
Lahore, Pakistan (grass)
Thailand	2
Pakistan	3

- Hong Kong and Pacific Oceania relegated to Group III in 1999.
- Pakistan promoted to Group I in 1999.

== First round ==
=== Philippines vs. Thailand ===
Philippines
1
Philippine Columbian Association, Manila, Philippines
3–5 April 1998
Clay (indoors)

Thailand
4

			1	2	3	4	5
1	(Philippines) (Thailand)	Adelo Abadia; Paradorn Srichaphan	1; 6	4; 6	6; 1	6; 4	5; 7
2	(Philippines) (Thailand)	Joseph Lizardo; Narathorn Srichaphan	3; 6	6; 2	3; 6	7^{7} 6^{2}	6; 4
3	(Philippines) (Thailand)	Robert Angelo / Bryan Juinio; Vittaya Samrej / Danai Udomchoke	6; 1	4; 6	4; 6	4; 6
4	(Philippines) (Thailand)	Joseph Lizardo; Paradorn Srichaphan	2; 6	6; 3	6^{5} 7^{7}	4; 6
5	(Philippines) (Thailand)	Adelo Abadia; Narathorn Srichaphan	4; 6	6; 2	4; 6

=== Chinese Taipei vs. Hong Kong ===
Chinese Taipei
3
Yilan Stadium, Yilan, Taiwan
3–5 April 1998
Carpet (indoors)

Hong Kong
2

			1	2	3	4	5
1	(Chinese Taipei) (Hong Kong)	Tsai Chia-yen; Christopher Lai	6; 2	6; 3	6; 3
2	(Chinese Taipei) (Hong Kong)	Chen Chih-jung; Melvin Tong	6; 2	1; 6	4; 6	6; 2	6; 8
3	(Chinese Taipei) (Hong Kong)	Chen Chih-jung / Lin Bing-chao; Christopher Lai / So Chun-yen	6; 3	6; 1	6; 1
4	(Chinese Taipei) (Hong Kong)	Tsai Chia-yen; Melvin Tong	7^{7} 6^{4}	4; 6	1; 6	0; 6
5	(Chinese Taipei) (Hong Kong)	Chen Chih-jung; Christopher Lai	6; 4	6; 2	6; 0

=== Pakistan vs. Pacific Oceania ===
Pakistan
5
Islamabad Club, Islamabad, Pakistan
3–5 April 1998
Clay

Pacific Oceania
0

			1	2	3	4	5
1	(Pakistan) (Pacific Oceania)	Asim Shafik; Lency Tenai	6; 0	6; 1	6; 0
2	(Pakistan) (Pacific Oceania)	Mohamed-Khaliq Siddiq; Lawrence Tere	6; 1	7; 5	6; 1
3	(Pakistan) (Pacific Oceania)	Mohamed-Khaliq Siddiq / Asim Shafik; Lawrence Tere / Sanjeev Tikaram	7; 5	6; 4	6; 2
4	(Pakistan) (Pacific Oceania)	Aqeel Khan; Sanjeev Tikaram	6; 1	6; 3
5	(Pakistan) (Pacific Oceania)	Nasser Shirazi; Lawrence Tere	6; 3	6; 4

=== Iran vs. Qatar ===
Iran
5
Shahid Shiroodi Complex, Tehran, Iran
17–19 April 1998
Clay (indoors)

Qatar
0

			1	2	3	4	5
1	(Iran) (Qatar)	Farhad Tadayon; Khaled Al-Haji	6; 3	6; 4	6; 0
2	(Iran) (Qatar)	Farshad Talavar; Mubarak Al-Tobaishi	6; 2	4; 6	6; 0	6; 0
3	(Iran) (Qatar)	Ramin Raziani / Seyed Akbar Taheri Rahaghi; Khaled Al-Haji / Mohammed Ali Al-Saoud	6; 3	6; 2	6; 2
4	(Iran) (Qatar)	Farshad Talavar; Khaled Al-Haji	6; 1	6; 2
5	(Iran) (Qatar)	Farhad Tadayon; Mubarak Al-Tobaishi	6; 2	6; 3

== Second round ==
=== Thailand vs. Chinese Taipei ===
Thailand
3
Royal Cliff Beach Resort, Pattaya, Thailand
17–19 July 1998
Hard

Chinese Taipei
2

			1	2	3	4	5
1	(Thailand) (Chinese Taipei)	Paradorn Srichaphan; Chen Chih-jung	6; 4	6; 4	6; 2
2	(Thailand) (Chinese Taipei)	Narathorn Srichaphan; Chen Wei-ju	1; 6	6^{4} 7^{7}	1; 6
3	(Thailand) (Chinese Taipei)	Vittaya Samrej / Narathorn Srichaphan; Chen Chih-jung / Lin Bing-chao	7^{8} 6^{6}	3; 6	6; 3	6; 3
4	(Thailand) (Chinese Taipei)	Paradorn Srichaphan; Chen Wei-ju	6; 2	6; 3	4; 6	2; 6	6; 1
5	(Thailand) (Chinese Taipei)	Narathorn Srichaphan; Tsai Chia-yen	6^{6} 7^{8}	2; 6

=== Iran vs. Pakistan ===
Iran
1
Enghelab Sport Complex, Tehran, Iran
17–19 July 1998
Clay

Pakistan
4

			1	2	3	4	5
1	(Iran) (Pakistan)	Farhad Tadayon; Mohamed-Khaliq Siddiq	3; 6	3; 6	6^{2} 7^{7}
2	(Iran) (Pakistan)	Seyed Akbar Taheri Rahaghi; Asim Shafik	4; 6	4; 6	4; 6
3	(Iran) (Pakistan)	Farhad Tadayon / Seyed Akbar Taheri Rahaghi; Mohamed-Khaliq Siddiq / Asim Shafik	1; 6	4; 6	4; 6
4	(Iran) (Pakistan)	Farshad Talavar; Aqeel Khan	6; 4	1; 6	4; 6
5	(Iran) (Pakistan)	Shahab Hassani-Nafez; Syed-Nasir Sherazi	6; 3	6; 2

== Relegation play-offs ==
=== Hong Kong vs. Philippines ===
Hong Kong
1
Victoria Park, Causeway Bay, Hong Kong
17–19 July 1998
Hard

Philippines
4

			1	2	3	4	5
1	(Hong Kong) (Philippines)	John Hui; Joseph Lizardo	6^{5} 7^{7}	6; 3	2; 3			retired
2	(Hong Kong) (Philippines)	Melvin Tong; Bryan Juinio	2; 6	6; 4	3; 6	3; 6
3	(Hong Kong) (Philippines)	Shane Barr / Andy Brothers; Adelo Abadia / Michael-John Misa	5; 7	5; 7	4; 6
4	(Hong Kong) (Philippines)	Melvin Tong; Joseph Lizardo	7; 5	6; 4
5	(Hong Kong) (Philippines)	Shane Barr; Bryan Juinio	2; 6	2; 6

=== Qatar vs. Pacific Oceania ===
Qatar
4
Khalifa International Tennis and Squash Complex, Doha, Qatar
17–19 July 1998
Hard

Pacific Oceania
1

			1	2	3	4	5
1	(Qatar) (Pacific Oceania)	Sultan Al-Alawi; Lawrence Tere	6; 4	6; 0	6; 2
2	(Qatar) (Pacific Oceania)	Nasser Al-Khelaifi; Lency Tenai	6^{4} 7^{7}	6; 4	6; 4	6; 2
3	(Qatar) (Pacific Oceania)	Sultan Al-Alawi / Nasser Al-Khelaifi; Lency Tenai / Lawrence Tere	7^{7} 6^{5}	3; 6	6; 4	6^{2} 7^{7}	6; 8
4	(Qatar) (Pacific Oceania)	Sultan Al-Alawi; Lency Tenai	6; 3	6; 1	6; 2
5	(Qatar) (Pacific Oceania)	Nasser Al-Khelaifi; Lawrence Tere	7; 5	6; 2

== Third round ==
=== Pakistan vs. Thailand ===
Pakistan
3
Lahore Gymkhana Club, Lahore, Pakistan
25–27 September 1998
Grass

Thailand
2

			1	2	3	4	5
1	(Pakistan) (Thailand)	Aisam-ul-Haq Qureshi; Danai Udomchoke	6; 3	6; 3	6; 3
2	(Pakistan) (Thailand)	Mohamed-Khaliq Siddiq; Paradorn Srichaphan	3; 6	4; 6	6; 1	7^{8} 6^{6}	8; 10
3	(Pakistan) (Thailand)	Mohamed-Khaliq Siddiq / Aisam-ul-Haq Qureshi; Vittaya Samrej / Narathorn Srichaphan	6; 4	6; 3	6; 1
4	(Pakistan) (Thailand)	Aisam-ul-Haq Qureshi; Paradorn Srichaphan	7^{7} 6^{5}	6^{1} 7^{7}	6; 4	5; 7	10; 12
5	(Pakistan) (Thailand)	Mohamed-Khaliq Siddiq; Narathorn Srichaphan	4; 6	6; 1	6; 3	6; 2
