= 1992 Davis Cup Asia/Oceania Zone Group II =

International tennis competition

The Asia/Oceania Zone is one of the three zones of the regional Davis Cup competition in 1992.

In the Asia/Oceania Zone there are three different tiers, called groups, in which teams compete against each other to advance to the upper tier. Winners in Group II advanced to the Asia/Oceania Zone Group I. Teams who lost their respective ties competed in the relegation play-offs, with winning teams remaining in Group II, whereas teams who lost their play-offs were relegated to the Asia/Oceania Zone Group III in 1993.

== Participating nations ==
- Bangladesh
- Hong Kong
- Jordan
- Malaysia
- Pakistan
- Singapore
- Sri Lanka
- Thailand

=== Draw ===
Relegation Play-offs
Amman, Jordan (hard)
Singapore	1
Jordan	4
Dhaka, Bangladesh (hard)
Bangladesh	1
Pakistan	4

First Round
Bangkok, Thailand (hard)
Thailand	5
Singapore	0
Kuala Lumpur, Malaysia (indoor hard)
Malaysia	4
Jordan	1
Colombo, Sri Lanka (clay)
Sri Lanka	4
Bangladesh	1
Lahore, Pakistan (indoor hard)
Pakistan	2
Hong Kong	3

Second Round
Kuala Lumpur, Malaysia (hard)
Thailand	3
Malaysia	2
Colombo, Sri Lanka (clay)
Sri Lanka	0
Hong Kong	5

Third Round
Causeway Bay, Hong Kong (hard)
Thailand	2
Hong Kong	3

- Singapore and Bangladesh relegated to Group III in 1993.
- Hong Kong promoted to Group I in 1993.

== First round ==
=== Thailand vs. Singapore ===
Thailand
5
Hua Mak Tennis Centre, Bangkok, Thailand
31 January–2 February 1992
Hard

Singapore
0

			1	2	3	4	5
1	(Thailand) (Singapore)	Narathorn Srichaphan; Lim Yang-tat	6; 3	6; 3	6; 1
2	(Thailand) (Singapore)	Tanakorn Srichaphan; Ho Kuen-yiep	6; 2	6; 0	6; 2
3	(Thailand) (Singapore)	Vittaya Samrej / Woraphol Thongkhamchu; Ho Kuen-yiep / Lim Yang-tat	6; 3	6; 0	6; 1
4	(Thailand) (Singapore)	Narathorn Srichaphan; Ho Kuen-yiep	6; 2	6; 4
5	(Thailand) (Singapore)	Tanakorn Srichaphan; Lim Yang-tat	6; 1	6; 0

=== Malaysia vs. Jordan ===
Malaysia
4
National Tennis Centre, Kuala Lumpur, Malaysia
31 January–2 February 1992
Hard (indoors)

Jordan
1

			1	2	3	4	5
1	(Malaysia) (Jordan)	Ramayah Ramachandran; Hani Al Ali	7; 5	6; 4	3; 6	6; 1
2	(Malaysia) (Jordan)	Adam Malik; Emad Abou Hamdeh	6; 0	6; 2	6; 2
3	(Malaysia) (Jordan)	Adam Malik / Ramayah Ramachandran; Hani Al Ali / Saleh Bushnaq	6; 4	6; 2	6; 3
4	(Malaysia) (Jordan)	Mohammed-Rahizam Abdul-Rahim; Hani Al Ali	4; 6	2; 6
5	(Malaysia) (Jordan)	Ramayah Ramachandran; Emad Abou Hamdeh	6; 2	4; 6	6; 4

=== Sri Lanka vs. Bangladesh ===
Sri Lanka
4
National Tennis Centre, Colombo, Sri Lanka
31 January–2 February 1992
Clay

Bangladesh
1

			1	2	3	4	5
1	(Sri Lanka) (Bangladesh)	Dishan Herath; Hira Lal	5; 7	6; 4	6; 2	4; 6	5; 7
2	(Sri Lanka) (Bangladesh)	Jayendra Wijeyesekera; Faisal-Syed Haq	6; 3	6; 0	6; 2
3	(Sri Lanka) (Bangladesh)	Dishan Herath / Jayendra Wijeyesekera; Faisal-Syed Haq / Hira Lal	6; 2	6; 1	6; 1
4	(Sri Lanka) (Bangladesh)	Jayendra Wijeyesekera; Hira Lal	6; 2	6; 2	4; 6	6; 1
5	(Sri Lanka) (Bangladesh)	Dishan Herath; Faisal-Syed Haq	7^{7} 6^{2}	7; 5

=== Pakistan vs. Hong Kong ===
Pakistan
2
Punjab Tennis Centre, Lahore, Pakistan
1–3 February 1992
Hard (indoors)

Hong Kong
3

			1	2	3	4	5
1	(Pakistan) (Hong Kong)	Rashid Malik; Pang Lui	6; 2	6; 3	6; 2
2	(Pakistan) (Hong Kong)	Mohammed Khalid; Mike Walker	3; 6	3; 6	5; 7
3	(Pakistan) (Hong Kong)	Rashid Malik / Hamed-ul-Haq; Mark Bailey / Mike Walker	4; 6	6^{5} 7^{7}	6^{5} 7^{7}
4	(Pakistan) (Hong Kong)	Rashid Malik; Mike Walker	3; 6	6; 4	2; 6	6; 4	4; 6
5	(Pakistan) (Hong Kong)	Mohammed Khalid; Pang Lui	7^{8} 6^{6}	6; 4

== Second round ==
=== Malaysia vs. Thailand ===
Malaysia
2
National Tennis Centre, Kuala Lumpur, Malaysia
27–29 March 1992
Hard

Thailand
3

			1	2	3	4	5
1	(Malaysia) (Thailand)	Adam Malik; Tanakorn Srichaphan	4; 6	7^{7} 6^{2}	7^{7} 6^{3}	6; 3
2	(Malaysia) (Thailand)	Ramayah Ramachandran; Narathorn Srichaphan	5; 7	2; 6	0; 6
3	(Malaysia) (Thailand)	Adam Malik / Ramayah Ramachandran; Vittaya Samrej / Woraphol Thongkhamchu	4; 6	7^{7} 6^{4}	4; 6	4; 6
4	(Malaysia) (Thailand)	Adam Malik; Narathorn Srichaphan	6; 4	6; 0	6; 3
5	(Malaysia) (Thailand)	Ramayah Ramachandran; Tanakorn Srichaphan	1; 6	6; 4	5; 7	1; 6

=== Sri Lanka vs. Hong Kong ===
Sri Lanka
0
National Tennis Centre, Colombo, Sri Lanka
27–29 March 1992
Clay

Hong Kong
5

			1	2	3	4	5
1	(Sri Lanka) (Hong Kong)	Dishan Herath; Mike Walker	0; 6	0; 6	0; 6
2	(Sri Lanka) (Hong Kong)	Jayendra Wijeyesekera; Colin Grant	1; 6	4; 6	2; 6
3	(Sri Lanka) (Hong Kong)	Dishan Herath / Jayendra Wijeyesekera; Colin Grant / Mike Walker	0; 6	2; 6	2; 6
4	(Sri Lanka) (Hong Kong)	Jayendra Wijeyesekera; Mike Walker	5; 7	7; 5	3; 6
5	(Sri Lanka) (Hong Kong)	Dishan Herath; Colin Grant	0; 6	0; 6

== Relegation play-offs ==
=== Jordan vs. Singapore ===
Jordan
4
National Tennis Centre, Amman, Jordan
27–29 March 1992
Hard

Singapore
1

			1	2	3	4	5
1	(Jordan) (Singapore)	Emad Abou Hamdeh; Ho Kuen-yiep	6; 2	6; 2	6; 4
2	(Jordan) (Singapore)	Hani Al Ali; Lim Yang-tat	6; 4	6; 3	2; 6	4; 6	9; 7
3	(Jordan) (Singapore)	Emad Abou Hamdeh / Hani Al Ali; Ho Kuen-yiep / Lim Yang-tat	6; 4	6; 4	6; 4
4	(Jordan) (Singapore)	Laith Azzouni; Derek Yong	7; 5	3; 6	6; 2
5	(Jordan) (Singapore)	Emad Abou Hamdeh; Lim Yang-tat	6; 3	4; 6	2; 6

=== Bangladesh vs. Pakistan ===
Bangladesh
1
National Tennis Complex, Dhaka, Bangladesh
27–29 March 1992
Hard

Pakistan
4

			1	2	3	4	5
1	(Bangladesh) (Pakistan)	Shibu Lal; Rashid Malik	2; 6	0; 6	1; 6
2	(Bangladesh) (Pakistan)	Hira Lal; Mohammed Khalid	1; 6	1; 6	4; 6
3	(Bangladesh) (Pakistan)	Faisal-Syed Haq / Hira Lal; Rashid Malik / Mohammed Khalid	3; 6	2; 6	2; 6
4	(Bangladesh) (Pakistan)	Hira Lal; Asaf Raja	6; 3	5; 7	6; 2
5	(Bangladesh) (Pakistan)	Shibu Lal; Mohammed Khalid	0; 6	2; 6

== Third round ==
=== Hong Kong vs. Thailand ===
Hong Kong
3
Victoria Park, Causeway Bay, Hong Kong
1–3 May 1992
Hard

Thailand
2

			1	2	3	4	5
1	(Hong Kong) (Thailand)	Colin Grant; Narathorn Srichaphan	3; 6	2; 6	6; 2	6; 1		retired
2	(Hong Kong) (Thailand)	Mike Walker; Tanakorn Srichaphan	6; 4	0; 6	6; 4	6; 3
3	(Hong Kong) (Thailand)	Mark Bailey / Mike Walker; Vittaya Samrej / Woraphol Thongkhamchu	3; 6	4; 6	6; 2	6; 3	6; 4
4	(Hong Kong) (Thailand)	Mike Walker; Woraphol Thongkhamchu	3; 6	7^{7} 6^{2}	6; 8
5	(Hong Kong) (Thailand)	Colin Grant; Tanakorn Srichaphan	2; 6	4; 6
