= Orawan Wongkamalasai =

Thai tennis player

- Country (sports): Thailand
- Born: 25 August 1981 (age 44)
- Prize money: $13,500

Singles
- Highest ranking: No. 426 (18 Sep 2000)

Doubles
- Highest ranking: No. 452 (18 Sep 2000)
Medal record
Southeast Asian Games
Gold medal – first place	1999 Bandar	Mixed doubles
Bronze medal – third place	1999 Bandar	Women's singles
Bronze medal – third place	1999 Bandar	Women's doubles
Bronze medal – third place	1999 Bandar	Women's team

Orawan Wongkamalasai (born 25 August 1981) is a Thai former professional tennis player.

Wongkamalasai, who had a best world ranking of 426, made her only WTA Tour main draw appearance as a wildcard at the 1998 Pattaya Open and was beaten in the first round by eighth seed Wang Shi-ting.

In 1999 she was a Southeast Asian Games gold medalist for Thailand in the mixed doubles (with Vittaya Samrej).

== ITF finals ==
=== Singles: 1 (0–1) ===
Outcome	No.	Date	Tournament	Surface	Opponent	Score
Runner-up	1.	Sep 1999	Tokyo, Japan	Hard	(China) Li Ting	0–6, 6–3, 0-6

=== Doubles: 4 (0–4) ===
Outcome	No.	Date	Tournament	Surface	Partner	Opponents	Score
Runner-up	1.	Aug 1997	Nonthaburi, Thailand	Hard	(Thailand) Sawitre Naree	(Chinese Taipei) Chung Yang-jin (South Korea) Kim Eun-kyung	2–6, 2–6
Runner-up	2.	Oct 1998	Ahmedabad, India	Hard	(Thailand) Monthika Anuchan	(India) Rushmi Chakravarthi (India) Sai Jayalakshmy Jayaram	6–1, 4–6, 3–6
Runner-up	3.	Nov 1998	Ahmedabad, India	Hard	(Thailand) Monthika Anuchan	(India) Rushmi Chakravarthi (India) Sai Jayalakshmy Jayaram	6–7^{(4)}, 6–1, 2–6
Runner-up	4.	Sep 2000	New Delhi, India	Hard	(Chinese Taipei) Wang I-ting	(India) Rushmi Chakravarthi (India) Sai Jayalakshmy Jayaram	3–6, 2–6
