= Monthika Anuchan =

Thai tennis player

- Country (sports): Thailand
- Born: 16 January 1980 (age 46)

Singles
- Highest ranking: No. 766 (1 Nov 1999)

Doubles
- Highest ranking: No. 846 (8 Sep 1997)
Medal record
Southeast Asian Games
Silver medal – second place	1999 Bandar	Mixed doubles
Bronze medal – third place	1999 Bandar	Women's doubles
Bronze medal – third place	1999 Bandar	Women's team

Monthika Anuchan (born 16 January 1980) is a Thai former professional tennis player.

Anuchan, a three-time Southeast Asian Games medalist, competed for the Thailand Fed Cup team between 1999 and 2001. She made all of her Fed Cup singles appearances in 1999, with wins over Lilia Biktyakova (Uzbekistan) and Liza Andriyani (Indonesia), then in the next two campaigns featured solely as a doubles player.

== ITF finals ==
=== Doubles: 2 (0–2) ===
Outcome	No.	Date	Tournament	Surface	Partner	Opponents	Score
Runner-up	1.	Oct 1998	Ahmedabad, India	Hard	(Thailand) Orawan Wongkamalasai	(India) Rushmi Chakravarthi (India) Sai Jayalakshmy Jayaram	6–1, 4–6, 3–6
Runner-up	2.	Nov 1998	Ahmedabad, India	Hard	(Thailand) Orawan Wongkamalasai	(India) Rushmi Chakravarthi (India) Sai Jayalakshmy Jayaram	6–7^{(4)}, 6–1, 2–6
