= Rushmi Chakravarthi =

Indian tennis player

Rushmi Chakravarthi రుష్మి చక్రవర్తి
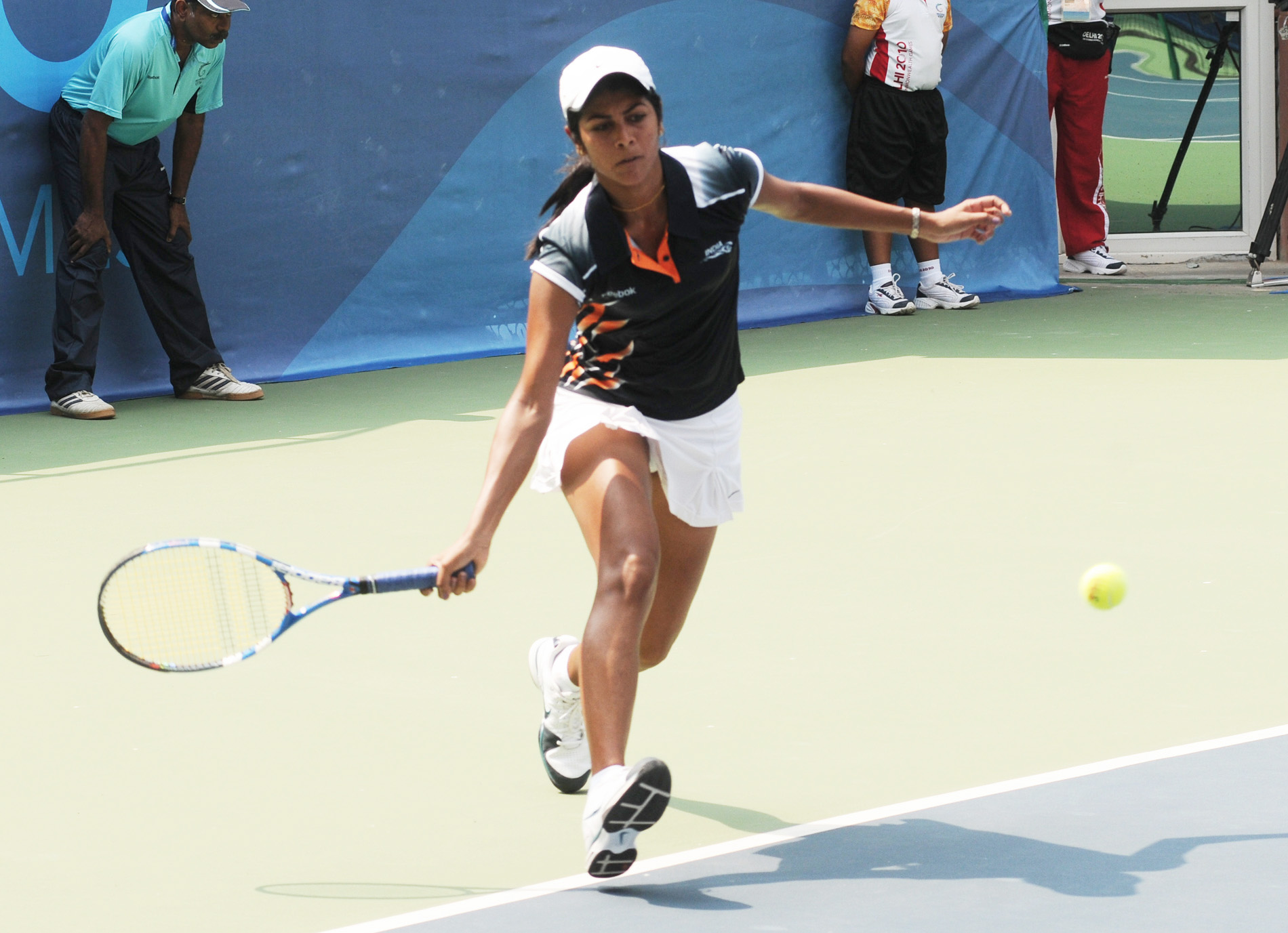
- Chakravarthi Rushmi in 2010
- Country (sports): India
- Residence: Chennai, India
- Born: 9 October 1977 (age 48) Hyderabad, India
- Height: 1.70 m (5 ft 7 in)
- Turned pro: September 2005
- Plays: Right-handed (two-handed backhand)
- Prize money: $124,005

Singles
- Career record: 321–241
- Career titles: 12 ITF
- Highest ranking: No. 310 (13 September 2004)

Doubles
- Career record: 372–209
- Career titles: 40 ITF
- Highest ranking: No. 252 (18 June 2001)

Other doubles tournaments
- Olympic Games: 1R (2012)
Medal record
Representing India
Women's tennis
Afro-Asian Games
Gold medal – first place	2003 Hyderabad	Women's doubles
Gold medal – first place	2003 Hyderabad	Team
Silver medal – second place	2003 Hyderabad	Singles
Silver medal – second place	2003 Hyderabad	Mixed doubles
Commonwealth Games
Bronze medal – third place	2010 Delhi	Women's doubles

Rushmi Chakravarthi (Telugu: రుష్మి చక్రవర్తి; born 9 October 1977) is an Indian former professional tennis player. She won a record 52 ITF titles, the highest number set by an Indian female player. She turned professional, after playing in the first round of the WTA Tour tournament Sunfeast Open, held at Kolkata in September 2005. Her last match on the ITF Circuit took place in June 2017 in Aurangabad.

== Tennis career ==
=== 2005–2010 ===
She was predominantly an ITF Circuit player. In her career, Chakravarthi played on the WTA Tour on two occasions, at the Sunfeast Open in 2005 and 2006, losing in round one both times.

Her career highlight was winning four medals (of which two were gold) at the 2003 Afro-Asian Games. Rushmi has represented India at the Asian Games in 2002, 2006 and 2010.

Chakravarthi lost in the qualifying of the Malaysian Open. This was her only performance in a WTA tournament outside India.

She has also competed in the 2010 Commonwealth Games in Delhi, where she progressed to the quarterfinals by beating English Katie O'Brien, and won the doubles bronze medal with Sania Mirza.

=== 2011 ===
Chakravarthi partnered with compatriot Poojashree Venkatesha to win the ITF event in Muzaffarnagar.

=== 2012 ===
Chakravarthi was awarded a wildcard entry to the 2012 London Olympics along with Sania Mirza to play in women's doubles. The pair were beaten in a tight three-setter by Taiwanese pair of Hsieh Su-wei and Chuang Chia-jung in round one.

== ITF Circuit finals ==
$100,000 tournaments
$75,000 tournaments
$50,000 tournaments
$25,000 tournaments
$15,000 tournaments
$10,000 tournaments

=== Singles: 24 (12–12) ===
Result	No.	Date	Tournament	Surface	Opponent	Score
Win	1.	12 October 1998	ITF Ahmedabad, India	Hard	(India) Sai Jayalakshmy Jayaram	7–6, 6–3
Loss	2.	26 October 1998	Ahmedabad, India	Hard	(India) Sai Jayalakshmy Jayaram	0–6, 2–6
Loss	3.	30 April 1999	Mumbai, India	Hard	(India) Shruti Dhawan	6–3, 0–6, 0–6
DNP	–	17 September 2000	Bangalore, India	Clay	(India) Radhika Tulpule	—N/a
Win	4.	16 April 2001	Chandigarh, India	Hard	(Indonesia) Dea Sumantri	6–2, 6–4
Win	5.	9 September 2001	New Delhi, India	Hard	(India) Shruti Dhawan	6–4, 5–7, 6–4
Loss	6.	14 July 2002	Algiers, Algeria	Clay	(Austria) Jennifer Schmidt	4–6, 3–6
Loss	7.	21 July 2002	Algiers, Algeria	Clay	(Germany) Isabel Collischonn	6–3, 4–6, 6–7
Win	8.	10 September 2002	Mysore, India	Hard	(India) Sai Jayalakshmy Jayaram	6–2, 6–1
Loss	9.	6 April 2003	Mumbai, India	Hard	(Uzbekistan) Akgul Amanmuradova	4–6, 6–3, 5–7
Win	10.	13 April 2003	Muzaffarnagar, India	Grass	(Israel) Cheli Bargil	6–0, 6–4
Loss	11.	5 October 2003	Jakarta, Indonesia	Hard	(India) Sania Mirza	3–6, 5–7
Loss	12.	17 January 2004	Hyderabad, India	Hard	(Indonesia) Sandy Gumulya	1–6, 3–6
Win	13.	23 May 2004	Lucknow, India	Grass	(India) Ankita Bhambri	6–2, 2–6, 7–6
Win	14.	30 May 2004	New Delhi, India	Hard	(India) Ankita Bhambri	6–4, 6–4
Win	15.	30 August 2004	New Delhi, India	Hard	(India) Sai Jayalakshmy Jayaram	6–3, 6–2
Loss	16.	30 October 2004	Pune, India	Hard	(Uzbekistan) Akgul Amanmuradova	0–6, 6–7
Win	17.	13 December 2004	Gurgaon, India	Clay	(India) Ankita Bhambri	6–7, 7–6, 6–4
Loss	18.	16 April 2005	Mumbai, India	Hard	(Chinese Taipei) Chan Chin-wei	4–6, 2–6
Loss	19.	30 October 2006	Ahmedabad, India	Hard	(India) Sanaa Bhambri	6–7^{(4)}, 6–4, 3–6
Loss	20.	20 May 2007	Mumbai, India	Hard	(Mauritius) Marinne Giraud	6–7^{(7)}, 2–6
Win	21.	28 April 2008	Cochin, India	Clay	(Georgia (country)) Magda Okruashvili	6–4, 7–5
Win	22.	9 June 2008	Gurgaon, India	Carpet	(India) Ankita Bhambri	6–4, 6–2
Win	23.	14 September 2009	New Delhi, India	Hard	(India) Sanaa Bhambri	6–3, 6–1
Loss	24.	21 September 2009	ITF Dehradun, India	Hard	(India) Poojashree Venkatesha	3–6, 5–7

=== Doubles: 73 (40–33) ===
Result	No.	Date	Tournament	Surface	Partner	Opponents	Score
Win	1.	12 October 1998	ITF Ahmedabad, India	Hard	(India) Sai Jayalakshmy Jayaram	(Thailand) Monthika Anuchan (Thailand) Orawan Wongkamalasai	1–6, 6–4, 6–3
Win	2.	19 October 1998	ITF Ahmedabad, India	Hard	(India) Sai Jayalakshmy Jayaram	(India) Archana Venkataraman (India) Arthi Venkataraman	6–2, 6–4
Loss	3.	26 October 1998	ITF Ahmedabad, India	Hard	(India) Sai Jayalakshmy Jayaram	(India) Shruti Dhawan (India) Sheethal Goutham	4–6, 4–6
Win	4.	2 November 1998	Ahmedabad, India	Hard	(India) Sai Jayalakshmy Jayaram	(Thailand) Monthika Anuchan (Thailand) Orawan Wongkamalasai	7–6^{(4)}, 1–6, 6–2
Win	5.	17 April 1999	Mumbai, India	Hard	(India) Sai Jayalakshmy Jayaram	(India) Shruti Dhawan (India) Sheethal Goutham	5–7, 6–0, 6–3
Win	6.	24 April 1999	Mumbai, India	Hard	(India) Sai Jayalakshmy Jayaram	(India) Archana Venkataraman (India) Arthi Venkataraman	7–5, 3–6, 7–6
Win	7.	30 April 1999	Mumbai, India	Hard	(India) Sai Jayalakshmy Jayaram	(India) Shruti Dhawan (India) Sheethal Goutham	7–5, 6–2
Loss	8.	10 May 1999	Mumbai, India	Carpet	(India) Sai Jayalakshmy Jayaram	(India) Shruti Dhawan (India) Sheethal Goutham	0–1 ret.
Loss	9.	18 October 1999	Jakarta, Indonesia	Hard	(India) Sai Jayalakshmy Jayaram	(Indonesia) Liza Andriyani (Thailand) Benjamas Sangaram	0–6, 3–6
Win	10.	16 April 2000	Mumbai, India	Hard	(India) Sai Jayalakshmy Jayaram	(India) Manisha Malhotra (Japan) Satomi Kinjo	6–4, 4–6, 2–1 ret.
Loss	11.	17 April 2000	New Delhi, India	Carpet	(India) Radhika Tulpule	(India) Sai Jayalakshmy Jayaram (India) Nirupama Sanjeev	4–6, 2–6
Loss	12.	3 September 2000	Jaipur, India	Grass	(India) Sai Jayalakshmy Jayaram	(Australia) Monique Adamczak (Austria) Jennifer Schmidt	3–6, 6–1, 5–7
Win	13.	10 September 2000	New Delhi, India	Hard	(India) Sai Jayalakshmy Jayaram	(Thailand) Orawan Wongkamalasai (Chinese Taipei) Wang I-ting	6–3, 6–2
DNP	–	17 September 2000	Bangalore, India	Clay	(India) Sai Jayalakshmy Jayaram	(India) Jyotsna Vasisht (India) Karishma Patel	—N/a
Loss	14.	16 October 2000	Gwalior, India	Clay	(India) Sai Jayalakshmy Jayaram	(Paraguay) Monica Acosta (Paraguay) Larissa Schaerer	2–4, 1–4, 4–0, 3–5
Win	15.	23 October 2000	New Delhi, India	Grass	(India) Sai Jayalakshmy Jayaram	(Slovenia) Urška Vesenjak (Slovenia) Maša Vesenjak	4–2, 4–5^{(5)}, 4–1, 4–0
Win	16.	30 October 2000	New Delhi, India	Hard	(India) Sai Jayalakshmy Jayaram	(Slovenia) Urška Vesenjak (Slovenia) Maša Vesenjak	5–3, 4–2, 5–3
Loss	17.	6 November 2000	Bandung, Indonesia	Hard	(India) Sai Jayalakshmy Jayaram	(Indonesia) Liza Andriyani (Indonesia) Angelique Widjaja	1–4, 2–4, 0–4
Win	18.	20 November 2000	Manila, Philippines	Hard	(India) Sai Jayalakshmy Jayaram	(Japan) Miho Saeki (Japan) Remi Uda	5–3, 4–1, 4–2
Win	19.	11 March 2001	New Delhi, India	Hard	(India) Sai Jayalakshmy Jayaram	(India) Archana Venkataraman (India) Arthi Venkataraman	6–1, 6–2
Win	20.	16 April 2001	Chandigarh, India	Hard	(India) Sai Jayalakshmy Jayaram	(Indonesia) Dea Sumantri (India) Radhika Tulpule	6–1, 7–5
Win	21.	23 April 2001	Pune, India	Hard	(India) Sai Jayalakshmy Jayaram	(India) Sania Mirza (India) Sonal Phadke	6–2, 6–0
Win	22.	3 September 2001	Chennai, India	Clay	(India) Sai Jayalakshmy Jayaram	(India) Samrita Sekar (India) Shubha Srinivasen	6–0, 7–6^{(2)}
Win	23.	19 September 2001	New Delhi, India	Hard	(India) Sai Jayalakshmy Jayaram	(India) Shruti Dhawan (India) Radhika Tulpule	6–7^{(5)}, 6–4, 6–4
Loss	24.	7 July 2002	Tlemcen, Algeria	Clay	(India) Sai Jayalakshmy Jayaram	(Austria) Susanne Aigner (Austria) Elisabeth Bahn	6–7, 6–4, 6–7
Win	25.	21 July 2002	Algiers, Algeria	Clay	(Greece) Christina Zachariadou	(Greece) Asimina Kaplani (Greece) Maria Pavlidou	6–2, 6–2
Win	26.	10 September 2002	Mysore, India	Hard	(India) Sai Jayalakshmy Jayaram	(Russia) Alena Dvornikova (Russia) Anastasia Dvornikova	6–3, 6–3
Loss	27.	27 October 2002	Cairo, Egypt	Clay	(India) Sai Jayalakshmy Jayaram	(Hungary) Kira Nagy (Sweden) Maria Wolfbrandt	2–6, 1–6
Loss	28.	9 February 2003	Chennai, India	Clay	(India) Sai Jayalakshmy Jayaram	(Uzbekistan) Akgul Amanmuradova (Uzbekistan) Ivanna Israilova	4–6, 1–6
Win	29.	23 February 2003	Bangalore, India	Hard	(India) Sai Jayalakshmy Jayaram	(Japan) Maki Arai (Belarus) Natallia Dziamidzenka	7–6, 7–6
Loss	30.	10 March 2003	Benalla, Australia	Grass	(Japan) Ryoko Takemura	(Australia) Nicole Sewell (Netherlands) Andrea van den Hurk	3–6, 6–4, 2–6
Loss	31.	31 March 2003	Mumbai, India	Hard	(India) Sai Jayalakshmy Jayaram	(Uzbekistan) Akgul Amanmuradova (Malaysia) Khoo Chin-bee	2–6, 2–6
Win	32.	20 April 2003	Muzaffarnagar, India	Grass	(India) Sai Jayalakshmy Jayaram	(India) Shruti Dhawan (Israel) Yael Glitzenshtein	6–1, 6–4
Win	33.	17 August 2003	Colombo, Sri Lanka	Clay	(India) Sai Jayalakshmy Jayaram	(Chinese Taipei) Hwang I-hsuan (Thailand) Varanya Vijuksanaboon	6–0, 6–0
Win	34.	8 September 2003	Bangalore, India	Grass	(India) Sai Jayalakshmy Jayaram	(Malaysia) Khoo Chin-bee (India) Meghha Vakaria	6–2, 6–4
Loss	35.	2 November 2003	Mumbai, India	Hard	(India) Sai Jayalakshmy Jayaram	(Czech Republic) Gabriela Chmelinová (Czech Republic) Hana Šromová	1–6, 1–6
Loss	36.	17 January 2004	Hyderabad, India	Hard	(India) Sai Jayalakshmy Jayaram	(India) Isha Lakhani (India) Meghha Vakaria	5–7, 7–5, 3–6
Win	37.	23 May 2004	Lucknow, India	Grass	(India) Ankita Bhambri	(India) Sai Jayalakshmy Jayaram (India) Archana Venkataraman	6–4, 6–1
Loss	38.	30 May 2004	New Delhi, India	Hard	(India) Ankita Bhambri	(India) Sanaa Bhambri (India) Liza Pereira Viplav	7–6, 3–6, 6–7
Loss	39.	8 August 2004	Wrexham, United Kingdom	Hard	(India) Sania Mirza	(New Zealand) Eden Marama (New Zealand) Paula Marama	6–7^{(4)}, 5–7
Win	40.	15 August 2004	Hampstead, United Kingdom	Hard	(India) Sania Mirza	(United Kingdom) Anna Hawkins (South Africa) Nicole Rencken	6–3, 6–2
Win	41.	21 August 2004	Colombo, Sri Lanka	Clay	(India) Sai Jayalakshmy Jayaram	(Chinese Taipei) Chan Yung-jan (Japan) Minori Takemoto	6–2, 5–7, 6–3
Win	42.	4 September 2004	New Delhi, India	Hard	(India) Sai Jayalakshmy Jayaram	(Thailand) Montinee Tangphong (Thailand) Thassha Vitayaviroj	w/o
Win	43.	13 December 2004	Gurgaon, India	Clay	(India) Sai Jayalakshmy Jayaram	(India) Ankita Bhambri (India) Sanaa Bhambri	2–6, 6–2, 6–4
Loss	44.	11 April 2005	ITF Mumbai, India	Hard	(India) Sai Jayalakshmy Jayaram	(Russia) Nina Bratchikova (Italy) Francesca Lubiani	3–6, 4–6
Loss	45.	3 August 2005	ITF Wrexham, United Kingdom	Hard	(New Zealand) Paula Marama	(United Kingdom) Anna Smith (United Kingdom) Rebecca Llewellyn	3–6, 5–7
Loss	46.	17 October 2005	Lagos Open, Nigeria	Hard	(India) Punam Reddy	(India) Ankita Bhambri (India) Sanaa Bhambri	w/o
Loss	47.	6 November 2005	Pune Championships, India	Hard	(India) Sai Jayalakshmy Jayaram	(Italy) Nicole Clerico (Kyrgyzstan) Ksenia Palkina	5–7, 6–7
Loss	48.	23 January 2006	ITF New Delhi, India	Hard	(India) Ankita Bhambri	(Kyrgyzstan) Ksenia Palkina (Italy) Nicole Clerico	w/o
Loss	49.	8 May 2006	ITF New Delhi, India	Hard	(India) Archana Venkataraman	(China) Zhao Yijing (China) Song Shanshan	3–6, 4–6
Win	50.	15 May 2006	ITF New Delhi, India	Hard	(India) Archana Venkataraman	(China) Zhao Yijing (China) Song Shanshan	6–7^{(5)}, 6–2, 6–4
Win	51.	12 June 2006	ITF New Delhi, India	Hard	(India) Meghha Vakaria	(India) Isha Lakhani (Thailand) Pichittra Thongdach	6–3, 6–4
Loss	52.	30 October 2006	Lagos Open, Nigeria	Hard	(India) Sanaa Bhambri	(South Africa) Surina De Beer (Romania) Ágnes Szatmári	3–6, 1–6
Win	53.	30 October 2006	ITF Ahmedabad, India	Hard	(India) Sanaa Bhambri	(India) Tara Iyer (India) Meghha Vakaria	6–2, 6–4
Win	54.	15 January 2007	ITF Algiers, Algeria	Clay	(Slovenia) Polona Hercog	(Czech Republic) Bárbora Matusová (Russia) Anna Savitskaya	6–2, 6–0
Win	55.	28 April 2008	ITF Cochin, India	Clay	(India) Poojashree Venkatesha	(India) Archana Venkataraman (India) Geeta Manohar	6–1, 7–5
Loss	56.	24 October 2008	Lagos Open, Nigeria	Hard	(India) Isha Lakhani	(Russia) Elena Chalova (Russia) Valeria Savinykh	7–6^{(6)}, 3–6, [7–10]
Win	57.	8 November 2008	ITF Muzaffarnagar, India	Grass	(India) Sanaa Bhambri	(India) Treta Bhattacharyya (India) Shalini Sahoo	6–1, 6–1
Win	58.	22 May 2009	ITF Mumbai, India	Hard	(India) Isha Lakhani	(Australia) Renee Binnie (China) He Chunyan	2–6, 6–3, [10–7]
Win	59.	29 May 2009	ITF New Delhi, India	Hard	(China) He Chunyan	(Israel) Keren Shlomo (Australia) Kristina Pejkovic	6–2, 6–1
Loss	60.	15 October 2009	Pune Championships, India	Hard	(India) Sanaa Bhambri	(Japan) Miki Miyamura (Japan) Moe Kawatoko	0–6, 3–6
Win	61.	21 May 2010	ITF Durban, South Africa	Hard	(India) Sanaa Bhambri	(South Africa) Tegan Edwards (South Africa) Bianca Swanepoel	3–6, 6–3, [10–4]
Loss	62.	28 May 2010	ITF Durban, South Africa	Hard	(India) Sanaa Bhambri	(Hungary) Blanka Szávay (Austria) Nicole Rottmann	6–3, 5–7, [9–11]
Win	63.	17 July 2010	ITF Hatyai, Thailand	Hard	(India) Poojashree Venkatesha	(Indonesia) Ayu-Fani Damayanti (Indonesia) Lavinia Tananta	6–3, 7–6^{(10)}
Loss	64.	30 October 2010	ITF Kuching, Malaysia	Hard	(France) Élodie Rogge-Dietrich	(Uzbekistan) Sabina Sharipova (Indonesia) Sandy Gumulya	3–6, 2–6
Loss	65.	4 December 2010	ITF Mandya, India	Hard	(India) Poojashree Venkatesha	(Thailand) Peangtarn Plipuech (Thailand) Nungnadda Wannasuk	1–6, 1–6
Win	66.	22 January 2011	ITF Muzaffarnagar, India	Grass	(India) Poojashree Venkatesha	(Japan) Mari Tanaka (Japan) Miki Miyamura	3–6, 6–4, [14–12]
Loss	67.	13 May 2011	ITF New Delhi, India	Hard	(Oman) Fatma Al-Nabhani	(India) Aishwarya Agrawal (India) Ankita Raina	4–6, 3–6
Loss	68.	18 June 2011	ITF New Delhi, India	Hard	(Israel) Keren Shlomo	(South Korea) Kim Hae-sung (South Korea) Kim Ju-eun]	3–6, 4–6
Loss	69.	25 June 2011	ITF New Delhi, India	Hard	(Israel) Keren Shlomo	(South Korea) Kim Hae-sung (South Korea) Kim Ju-eun	5–7, 0–6
Win	70.	12 May 2012	ITF New Delhi, India	Hard	(India) Ankita Raina	(China) Liu Yuxuan (China) Zhao Qianqian	6–1, 6–4
Win	71.	26 May 2012	ITF New Delhi, India	Hard	(India) Ankita Raina	(India) Sri Peddy Reddy (India) Prarthana Thombare	6–3, 6–2
Loss	72.	30 April 2013	ITF Chennai, India	Clay	(India) Ankita Raina	(India) Natasha Palha (India) Prarthana Thombare	7–5, 3–6, [6–10]
Loss	73.	12 December 2014	ITF Lucknow, India	Grass	(India) Nidhi Chilumula	(India) Ankita Raina (United Kingdom) Emily Webley-Smith	2–6, 4–6
