= Suwandi (tennis) =

Indonesian tennis player

- Country (sports): Indonesia
- Born: 21 August 1976 (age 50) Bandung, Indonesia
- Height: 1.78 m (5 ft 10 in)
- Plays: Right-handed
- Prize money: US$76,231

Singles
- Career record: 14–25
- Career titles: 0
- Highest ranking: No. 240 (18 June 2001)

Grand Slam singles results
- Australian Open: Q1 (2002)
- French Open: Q1 (2001)
- Wimbledon: Q2 (2001)
- US Open: Q1 (2001)

Doubles
- Career record: 12–7
- Career titles: 0
- Highest ranking: No. 318 (16 October 1995)
Medal record
Representing Indonesia
Asian Games
Silver medal – second place	1994 Hiroshima	Team
Bronze medal – third place	2002 Busan	Team
SEA Games
Gold medal – first place	1993 Singapore	Men's Single
Gold medal – first place	1997 Jakarta	Team
Gold medal – first place	2001 Kuala Lumpur	Team
Gold medal – first place	2003 Ho Chi Minh City	Team
Gold medal – first place	2003 Ho Chi Minh City	Mixed Doubles
Silver medal – second place	1993 Singapore	Men's Double
Silver medal – second place	1999 Bandar Seri Begawan	Team
Silver medal – second place	2001 Kuala Lumpur	Men's Single
Silver medal – second place	2001 Kuala Lumpur	Mixed Doubles
Silver medal – second place	2003 Ho Chi Minh City	Men's Double
Silver medal – second place	2005 Manila	Team
Silver medal – second place	2005 Manila	Mixed Doubles
Silver medal – second place	2007 Nakhon Ratchasima	Team
Bronze medal – third place	1993 Singapore	Team
Bronze medal – third place	1995 Chiang Mai	Team
Bronze medal – third place	1995 Chiang Mai	Men's Single
Bronze medal – third place	1995 Chiang Mai	Men's Double
Bronze medal – third place	1997 Jakarta	Men's Single
Bronze medal – third place	1997 Jakarta	Men's Double
Bronze medal – third place	1999 Bandar Seri Begawan	Men's Single
Bronze medal – third place	1999 Bandar Seri Begawan	Men's Double
Bronze medal – third place	1999 Bandar Seri Begawan	Mixed Doubles
Bronze medal – third place	2005 Manila	Men's Doubles

Suwandi (born 21 August 1976) is an Indonesian former professional tennis player.

Suwandi reached his highest individual ranking on the ATP Tour on June 18, 2001, when he became World number 208. He plays primarily on the Futures circuit and the Challenger circuit.

Suwandi was a member of the Indonesian Davis Cup team, posting a 23–26 record in singles and an 11–3 record in doubles in thirty-three ties played.

== Performance timeline ==
Key
W	F	SF	QF	#R	RR	Q#	DNQ	A	NH

(W) winner; (F) finalist; (SF) semifinalist; (QF) quarterfinalist; (#R) rounds 4, 3, 2, 1; (RR) round-robin stage; (Q#) qualification round; (DNQ) did not qualify; (A) absent; (NH) not held; (SR) strike rate (events won / competed); (W–L) win–loss record.

=== Singles ===
Tournament	2001	2002	SR	W–L	Win %
Grand Slam tournaments
Australian Open		Q1	0 / 0	0–0	–
French Open	Q1	A	0 / 0	0–0	–
Wimbledon	Q2		0 / 0	0–0	–
US Open	Q1		0 / 0	0–0	–
Win–loss	0–0	0–0	0 / 0	0–0	–

== Career finals ==
=== Tour singles titles – all levels (4–3) ===
Legend (singles)
Grand Slam (0–0)
Tennis Masters Cup (0–0)
ATP Masters Series (0–0)
ATP Tour (0–0)
Challengers (0–1)
Futures (4–2)

Result	No.	Date	Tournament	Surface	Opponent	Score
Win	1.	11 September 2000	Kashiwa, Japan F6	Hard	(Germany) Benjamin Becker	6–7, 6–4, 7–6
Loss	1.	19 February 2001	Ho Chi Minh City, Vietnam	Hard	(Czech Republic) Petr Kralert	2–6, 6–2, 4–6
Win	2.	23 April 2001	Andijan, Uzbekistan F1	Hard	(Russia) Denis Golovanov	6–1, 6–4
Win	3.	30 April 2001	Andijan, Uzbekistan F2	Hard	(Uzbekistan) Oleg Ogorodov	6–2, 7–5
Loss	2.	9 August 2004	Makassar, Indonesia F2	Hard	(South Korea) Chung Hee-seok	6–7, 3–6
Loss	3.	9 May 2005	Phuket, Thailand F2	Hard	(Germany) Simon Stadler	3–6, 2–6
Win	4.	14 August 2006	Manado, Indonesia	Hard	(Indonesia) Elbert Sie	6–4, 7–5

=== Tour doubles titles – all levels (7–4) ===
Legend (doubles)
Grand Slam (0–0)
Tennis Masters Cup (0–0)
ATP Masters Series (0–0)
ATP Tour (0–0)
Challengers (0–0)
Futures (7–4)

Result	No.	Date	Tournament	Surface	Partner	Opponent	Score
Win	1.	29 July 2002	Seogwipo, Korea Republic F3	Hard	(South Korea) Kyu-Tae Im	(Japan) Tasuku Iwami (Japan) Toshiaki Sakai	5–7, 7-6^{(7–5)}, 6–2
Win	2.	26 August 2002	Taizhou, China F4	Hard	(United States) Brandon Hawk	(China) Xu Ran (China) Zeng Shao-Xuan	2–6, 6–3, 6–2
Win	3.	2 September 2002	Kashiwa, Japan F6	Hard	(Indonesia) Peter Handoyo	(Chinese Taipei) Lu Yen-Hsun (Japan) Toshihide Matsui	6–3, 6–2
Win	4.	6 January 2003	Lucknow, India F1	Grass	(Indonesia) Peter Handoyo	(Japan) Satoshi Iwabuchi (South Korea) Kim Dong-hyun	6–4, 6–2
Win	5.	16 June 2003	Kassel, Germany F7	Clay	(Indonesia) Peter Handoyo	(Argentina) Patricio Arquez (Argentina) Francisco Cabello	6-7^{(4–7)}, 6–4, 6–4
Loss	1.	1 September 2003	Jakarta, Indonesia F2	Hard	(Indonesia) Hendri Susilo Pramono	(Thailand) Sanchai Ratiwatana (Thailand) Sonchat Ratiwatana	3–6, 1–6
Loss	2.	10 August 2004	Makassar, Indonesia F2	Hard	(Indonesia) Bonit Wiryawan	(South Korea) Kim Dong-hyun (South Korea) Kwon Oh-Hee	5–7, 7-6^{(7–5)}, 2–6
Loss	3.	9 May 2005	Phuket, Thailand F2	Hard	(Indonesia) Bonit Wiryawan	(Brazil) Josh Goffi (United States) Trevor Spracklin	6–4, 3–6, 5–7
Win	6.	1 August 2005	Yogyakarta, Indonesia F1	Hard	(Indonesia) Bonit Wiryawan	(Indonesia) Christopher Rungkat (Indonesia) Febi Widhiyanto	6-4 6–2
Loss	4.	9 August 2005	Semarang, Indonesia F2	Hard	(Indonesia) Bonit Wiryawan	(Chinese Taipei) Chang Kai-Lung (Chinese Taipei) Yi Chu-Huan	3-6 4–6
Win	7.	16 August 2005	Makassar, Indonesia F3	Hard	(Indonesia) Bonit Wiryawan	(Chinese Taipei) Hsieh Wang-Cheng (Chinese Taipei) Lee Hsin-han	6-2 7-6^{(7–4)}
