= Maricris Fernandez =

Filipino tennis player (born 1979)

- Full name: Maricris Fernandez-Gentz
- Country (sports): Philippines
- Born: July 23, 1979 (age 46)
- Prize money: 18,456

Singles
- Career record: 66–38
- Career titles: 4 ITF
- Highest ranking: No. 284 (October 18, 1999)

Doubles
- Career titles: 16–24
- Highest ranking: No. 601 (November 11, 1991)

Team competitions
- Fed Cup: 12–2
Medal record
Women's tennis
Representing Philippines
Southeast Asian Games
Gold medal – first place	1999 Bandar Seri Begawan	Singles
Bronze medal – third place	1995 Chang Mai	Doubles
Bronze medal – third place	1995 Chang Mai	Team
Bronze medal – third place	1997 Jakarta	Team
Silver medal – second place	1999 Bandar Seri Begawan	Team

Maricris Fernandez-Gentz (born July 23, 1979) is a Filipino former tennis player.

== Career ==
Fernandez was an active tennis player in the 1990s. At 14-years old, she priotized her tennis career over her education.

Playing for Philippines at the Fed Cup, Gentz has a win–loss record of 12–2.

She has won at least two PCA Open women's singles title (1994 and 1996).

She won the girls event of the 1995 and 1997 Mitsubishi Lancer International Junior Tennis Championship.

She won the women's single gold medal at the 1999 SEA Games in Brunei. No Filipina would win a gold medal until the 2025 edition where Alexandra Eala ended the 26-year medal drought.

Fernandez has career-high WTA rankings of 284 in singles, achieved in 1999. She was the highest ranked Filipino player ever on the WTA circuit until Eala surpassed her in 2022 reaching 280.

In 2001, she reportedly retired to focus on resuming her studies in Los Angeles. In 2009, she returned from retirement and secured a wildcard entry at the Holcim/ITF Women’s Circuit Tournament.

== ITF Circuit finals ==
$100,000 tournaments
$75,000 tournaments
$50,000 tournaments
$25,000 tournaments
$10,000 tournaments

=== Singles: 7 (4–3) ===
Outcome	No.	Date	Tournament	Surface	Opponent	Score
Runner-up	1.	22 November 1992	Manila, Philippines	Hard	(Philippines) Evangelina Olivarez	4–6, 6–4, 5–7
Winner	2.	15 September 1996	Bangkok, Thailand	Hard	(Japan) Miyako Ataka	6–3, 6–2
Winner	3.	4 November 1996	Manila, Philippines	Hard	(China) Liu Hui-Na	2–6, 6–3, 6–3
Winner	4.	11 November 1996	Manila, Philippines	Hard	(Malaysia) Khoo Chin-bee	6–0, 6–1
Winner	5.	16 November 1998	Manila, Philippines	Hard	(South Africa) Lara van Rooyen	6–2, 6–0
Runner-up	6.	27 June 1999	Easton, United States	Hard	(Venezuela) Milagros Sequera	5–7, 2–6
Runner-up	7.	4 July 1999	Springfield, United States	Hard	(United States) Jennifer Hopkins	1–6, 0–6
