= Jaime Recio =

Filipino sports shooter

Personal information
- Nationality: Filipino
- Born: 15 January 1954 (age 71)

Sport
- Sport: Sports shooting

Jaime Recio (born 15 January 1954) is a Filipino sports shooter. He competed in the mixed trap event at the 1992 Summer Olympics.
