= Pamela Floro =

Filipino tennis player (born 1979)

- Full name: Pamela Floro-Worthington
- Country (sports): Philippines
- Born: 18 August 1979 (age 46)
- Height: 5 ft 3 in (160 cm)

Singles
- Highest ranking: No. 987 (23 Jun 1997)

Doubles
- Highest ranking: No. 566 (15 Sep 1997)
Medal record
Southeast Asian Games
Silver medal – second place	1999 Bandar	Women's team
Bronze medal – third place	1997 Jakarta	Women's team

Pamela Floro-Worthington (born 18 August 1979) is a Filipino former professional tennis player.

Floro, a native of Manila, was a Southeast Asian Games and Fed Cup representative for the Philippines. While playing for the Philippines Fed Cup team in 1997 and 1998 she amassed four doubles wins, all partnering Jennifer Saret.

Leaving the tour in 1998, Floro spent the next period of her career in collegiate tennis. She started out at Southern Illinois University, before transferring to the University of Maryland after her sophomore season.
