= Hendri Susilo Pramono =

Indonesian tennis player

- Country (sports): Indonesia
- Born: 5 July 1979 (age 46) Surakarta, Indonesia
- Plays: Right-handed
- Prize money: $16,203

Singles
- Career record: 1–1 (Davis Cup)
- Highest ranking: No. 657 (2 Oct 2000)

Doubles
- Career record: 4–2 (Davis Cup)
- Highest ranking: No. 399 (13 Nov 2000)
Medal record
Southeast Asian Games
Tennis
Gold medal – first place	2003 Ho Chi Minh City	Men's team
Silver medal – second place	1999 Bandar Seri Begawan	Men's team
Silver medal – second place	2003 Ho Chi Minh City	Men's doubles
Silver medal – second place	2003 Ho Chi Minh City	Mixed doubles
Bronze medal – third place	1999 Bandar Seri Begawan	Men's doubles
Bronze medal – third place	1999 Bandar Seri Begawan	Mixed doubles
Soft tennis
Gold medal – first place	2011 Palembang	Men's team
Bronze medal – third place	2011 Palembang	Men's singles

Hendri Susilo Pramono (born 5 July 1979) is an Indonesian former professional tennis player.

Born in Surakarta, Pramono reached a career high singles ranking of 657 while competing on the professional tour and was ranked as high as 399 in doubles. He spent his career on the ITF Futures circuit and won three doubles titles.

Pramono featured in seven Davis Cup ties for Indonesia, between 1999 and 2004, mostly as a doubles player.

A regular Southeast Asian Games competitor, Pramono won six medals for his country in tennis, which included a team gold in 2003. He has also represented Indonesia at the Southeast Asian Games in the sport of soft tennis, winning two medals in 2011. At the 2014 Asian Games he was a member of Indonesia's team in soft tennis.

Pramono now works as a coach and has served as Indonesia's Davis Cup captain.

== See also ==
- List of Indonesia Davis Cup team representatives
