= Bryan Juinio =

Filipino-American tennis player

- Full name: Bryan Malonzo Juinio
- Country (sports): Philippines
- Born: October 10, 1974 (age 51)

Singles
- Highest ranking: No. 959 (Jun 14, 1999)

Grand Slam singles results
- US Open: Q1 (1994)

Doubles
- Highest ranking: No. 1300 (Mar 30, 1998)
Medal record
Southeast Asian Games
Silver medal – second place	1999 Bandar	Men's singles
Bronze medal – third place	1997 Jakarta	Men's team
Bronze medal – third place	1999 Bandar	Men's team

Bryan Malonzo Juinio (born 10 October 1974) is a Filipino-American former professional tennis player.

Before competing professionally, Juinio was a college tennis player for Fresno State, along with twin brother Ryan. In his collegiate career, from 1992 to 1996, he amassed a then team record 105 singles wins.

Juinio played Davis Cup tennis for the Philippines in 1998 and 1999, winning six singles rubbers. He was runner-up to Paradorn Srichaphan at the 1999 Southeast Asian Games.
