= Febi Widhiyanto =

Indonesian tennis player

- Country (sports): Indonesia
- Born: 9 February 1980 (age 46)
- Plays: Right-handed
- Prize money: $19,505

Singles
- Highest ranking: No. 495 (3 November 2003)

Doubles
- Career titles: 3 ITF Futures
- Highest ranking: No. 422 (20 November 2000)

Febi Widhiyanto (born 9 February 1980) is an Indonesian former professional tennis player.

A right-handed player from Jakarta, Widhiyanto competed in junior events at the French Open and Wimbledon. He had a win over Roger Federer at the 1996 World Youth Cup (Junior Davis Cup).

In his professional career he reached a top singles ranking of 495 in the world and won three doubles titles on the ITF Futures Circuit.

Widhiyanto played in 13 Davis Cup ties for Indonesia, winning 15 singles rubbers. He also represented Indonesia at the Southeast Asian Games, including in 2003 when he won a silver medal in the singles. As of 2019 he is Indonesia's non playing Davis Cup captain.

== See also ==
- List of Indonesia Davis Cup team representatives
