= Narathorn Srichaphan =

Thai tennis player

- Full name: Narathorn Srichaphan
- Country (sports): Thailand
- Born: 5 August 1972 (age 53)

Singles
- Highest ranking: No. 716 (3 May 1999)

Doubles
- Career record: 1–1
- Highest ranking: No. 461 (14 September 1998)

Narathorn Srichaphan (born 5 August 1972) is a former professional tennis player from Thailand.

== Biography ==
Srichaphan was a boys' doubles quarter-finalist at the 1990 Wimbledon Championships, beating Andriy Medvedev en route.

He represented Thailand in Asian Games and Southeast Asian Games competition during his career. A multiple Southeast Asian Games gold medalist, he also won a gold medal at the 1998 Asian Games, partnering younger brother Paradorn in the doubles.

His only ATP Tour main draw appearance came in the doubles at the 2003 Thailand Open, where he and brother Paradorn made the quarter-finals as wildcards.

He featured in a total of 29 Davis Cup ties for Thailand, the last in 2003.
