= Vittaya Samrej =

Thai tennis player and coach

- Country (sports): Thailand
- Born: 18 February 1964 (age 62)

Singles
- Career record: 2-3 (Davis Cup)
- Highest ranking: No. 963 (10 September 1990)

Doubles
- Career record: 21-13 (Davis Cup)
- Highest ranking: No. 789 (14 May 2001)

Vittaya Samrej (born 18 February 1964) is a Thai tennis coach and former professional player. As of 2020 he is team captain of Thailand's Davis Cup team.

Samrej had a record 18-year long Davis Cup career playing for Thailand, featuring in 37 ties between 1985 and 2002, mostly as a doubles specialist. He won 21 doubles rubbers in total, which is a former Thai record. His two singles wins both came in a 1997 tie against Hong Kong.

A regular participant in the Southeast Asian Games, Samrej has won numerous medals, including three doubles gold medals. He won a further four gold medals for his country in the team event.

Samrej won a team bronze medal at the 1986 Asian Games, then a mixed doubles bronze at the 1990 Asian Games.

His son, Kasidit Samrej, is a Davis Cup player for Thailand.
