= 1999 SEA Games =

Multi-sport event in Brunei

XX SEA Games
- Host city: Bandar Seri Begawan, Brunei
- Nations: 10
- Athletes: 2365
- Events: 233 in 21 sports
- Opening: 7 August 1999
- Closing: 15 August 1999
- Opened by: Hassanal Bolkiah; Sultan of Brunei
- Athlete's Oath: Haji Md Samid Abdul Aziz
- Torch lighter: Dayang Umi Karim
- Ceremony venue: Hassanal Bolkiah National Stadium
- Website: seagames20.net.bn

The 1999 SEA Games (Malay: Sukan SEA 1999, Jawi: سوکن SEA 1999), officially known as the 20th SEA Games and commonly known as Brunei Darussalam 1999, were a Southeast Asian multi-sport event held in Bandar Seri Begawan, Brunei. This was the first time Brunei hosted the Southeast Asian Games and also in Borneo island. These were the last to have ever staged during the 20th century, and this was the only occasion, to date, that Brunei had held the SEA Games.

Around 2,365 athletes from 10 participating nations participated at the Brunei Games, which featured 233 events in 21 sports. Brunei is the seventh country to host the Southeast Asian Games after Thailand, Myanmar, Malaysia, Singapore, Indonesia and the Philippines. The games was held from 7 to 15 August 1999, although several events had commenced from 30 July 1999. The games were opened by Sultan Haji Hassanal Bolkiah at the National Sports Complex named after him, Hassanal Bolkiah National Stadium.

The final medal tally was led by Thailand, followed by Malaysia and Indonesia with host Brunei in seventh place. Several Games and National Records were broken during the games.

== Development and preparation ==
The 20th SEA Games Organising Committee was formed to oversee the staging of the games.

=== Venues ===
The 1999 Southeast Asian Games used a mix of new, existing and temporary venues. Some major retrofitting work were done in most venues to host the multi-sport event.

At the centrepiece of the activities was the Hassanal Bolkiah Sports Complex which was completed in September 1983. Incorporating the 28,000-seat national stadium, it hosted most of the events. As Brunei have limited sports facilities, only 21 sports were held in the country.

A games village was not built. Instead, a "village in the city" concept saw athletes and officials housed in were housed in service apartment and hotels respectively across Brunei, with the former served as the games village for the athletes. Besides being physically near to the Hassanal Bolkiah Sports Complex, it was hoped that it will add vibe to the city and reduce post-games costs in converting a dedicated games village to other uses.

The 20th Southeast Asian Games had 22 venues for the games.

Nation	Competition Venue	Sports
Brunei	Hassanal Bolkiah National Sports Complex
Brunei	Hassanal Bolkiah National Stadium	Athletics, Football, Billiards and Snooker, Lawn bowls, Boxing, Opening and closing ceremonies
Brunei	Aquatic Centre	Aquatics (Swimming, Diving, Water polo)
Brunei	Indoor Stadium	Badminton
Brunei	Hockey Stadium	Hockey
Brunei	Multi Purpose Hall	Pencak silat
Brunei	Squash Centre	Squash
Brunei	Tennis Centre	Tennis
Brunei	Others
Brunei	University of Brunei Darussalam	Basketball
Brunei	Gadong Police Headquarters	Boxing
Brunei	Muara-Tutong Highway	Cycling (Individual time trial)
Brunei	Jalan Kianggeh, Jalan Sultan, Jalan Bendahara, Jalan Cator	Cycling (criterium)
Brunei	Youth Centre	Cycling (mass start)
Brunei	Bukit Shahbandar Forest Recreation Park	Cycling (Mountain Bike: Downhill, Cross-country)
Brunei	Youth and sports complex	Football
Brunei	Sultan Hassanal Bolkiah Sports Centre	Football
Brunei	Pantai Mentiri Golf Club	Golf
Brunei	Royal Brunei Airlines Sports Complex, Berakas	Karate
Brunei	Muhibbah Hall Brunei Muara District Office, Berakas	Sepak takraw
Brunei	Jerudong Park Trap & Skeet Range, Jerudong	Shooting
Brunei	Menglait Sports Complex	Table tennis, Taekwondo
Brunei	Utama Bowling Centre	Bowling
Brunei	Water sports complex, Serasa	Traditional boat race

== Marketing ==
=== Logo ===
Awang Budiman, the official mascot of the games.

The logo of the 1999 Southeast Asian Games is an image of a torch, the symbol of the Games that represents vitality, sportsmanship and tradition. The logo that is coloured in red, yellow and green symbolises the excitement of the games. The ten interlinked gold rings, the logo of the Southeast Asian Games Federation represents the participating nations of the Southeast Asian Games, and the Southeast Asian Games itself. The gold colour of the logo represents quality, achievement and victory. The games' logo is the first logo in Southeast Asian Games history to use the 10-ring chain which last until the 2011 games.

=== Mascot ===
The mascot of the 1999 Southeast Asian Games is a boy named Awang Budiman. His traditional Malay attire bears the colours of the flag of Brunei, which symbolises the traditional cultural identity of the nation. "Awang" is a title for Bruneian males, while the name "Budiman" represents the wise and courteous characteristics of Brunei as the host of the games.

=== Songs ===
A song album of the games was released during the games which contains songs written by Prince Sufri Bolkiah. These include the theme song of the games: "Mencari Kejayaan" (In search for success) which was composed by Prince Haji Sufri Bolkiah and was sung by Ak Mohd Yusri. The other songs are "Here We Meet", "Selamat Datang" (Welcome), "Tekad Kemenangan" (Determined to win), "Skuad Negara" (National Squad) and "Till We Meet Again".

=== Sponsors ===
A total of 9 sponsors sponsored the games.

- Royal Brunei Airlines
- Nestle Milo
- Royal Dutch Shell
- Brunei Postal Services Department
- Telekom Brunei
- Incomm
- Fascom
- Canon Inc.
- The Centrepoint

== The games ==
=== Opening ceremony ===
The opening ceremony began at 20:00 BST with the arrival of guests, VIPs and Prince Haji Sufri Bolkiah, President of the National Olympic Council of Brunei Darussalam and Chairman of the 20th SEA Games Organising Committee into the stadium, the marching performance by the Royal Brunei Armed Forces and the Royal Brunei Police Force and the stage performance by local artists including Ak Mohd Yusri who performed the games' theme song, Mencari Kejayaan.

At 20:30 BST, His Majesty Sultan Haji Hassanal Bolkiah Muizaddin Waddaulah, Sultan and Yang Di-Pertuan of Brunei Darussalam, Her Majesty Raja Isteri Pengiran Anak Hajah Saleha and the members of the royal family arrived at the stadium. The armed forces bringing in the National Flag of Brunei and the National Anthem of Brunei was played as the National Flag of Brunei was raised. The Sultan then inspected of the guards of honour of the Armed Forces.

Later, the march past by 50 flag bearers of the SEA Games flags and Mascot started, followed by 100 flag bearers carrying the flags of all participating nations. The contingents of each country also paraded into the stadium began with the Cambodia contingent. The host Contingent, Brunei led by Crown Prince Pengiran Muda Haji Al-Muhtadee Billah, Prince Abdul Mateen, Princess Azemah Ni'matul Bolkiah and Princess Fadzillah Lubabul Bolkiah, received the warmest welcome when they marched into the stadium.

After that, the President delivered his welcoming speech and the games was then declared opened by the Sultan. Fathan and Ernie then performed the song Selamat Datang. Later, the Royal Armed Force personnel then marched into the stadium taking the games flag with them and raised them beside the Brunei National Flag. The 20th SEA Games cauldron was then lit by Dayang Umi Kalthum Haji Karim, Brunei's gold medalist in Pencak Silat event at the 17th SEA Games in Singapore. The reading of the SEA Games oath was led by the 15th SEA Games Gold Medalist in Shooting event, Lieutenant Colonel Dato Setia Haji Md Samid Haji Abdul Aziz. The ceremony concluded with field performance presented by paratroopers, five-thousand students of Brunei and three hundred Brunei Shell Employees.

=== Closing ceremony ===
The closing ceremony began at 20:00 BST with the arrival of the Crown Prince at the National Stadium alongside the President of the National Olympic Council of Brunei Darussalam and the Chairman of the 20th SEA Games Organising Committee. Also presented were other members of the royal family.

After that, a video clip on the highlights of the 20th SEA Games was broadcast, followed by the Games Mascot performance which portrayed the images of some of the sports events during the nine days sport meet, the parade of athletes competed at the games with Prince Abdul Mateen, Princess Azeemah Niqmatul Bolkiah and Princess Fadzillah Lubabul Bolkiah leading the Brunei contingent by order of sports. A song presentation entitled "Skuad Negara" composed by the President of the Brunei Darussalam National Olympic Council was performed by a Bruneian choir group. The President then gave his speech. Later, the Crown Prince declared the games closed.

The cauldron was later extinguished with the President of the National Olympic Council of Brunei Darussalam and the Chairman of the 20th SEA Games Organising Committee, handed over the SEA Games Flag to the Malaysian representative, Tunku Emran Tuanku Jaafar, President of the Malaysia Olympic Council, represented the SEA Games responsibilities being handed over to Malaysia, host of the 2001 Southeast Asian Games.

The national anthem of Malaysia was played as the National Flag of Malaysia was raised. Later, a Malaysia segment performance, "Gemilang Malaysia" was performed by members of the Sabah Cultural Board and the Sarawak Cultural Village as well as 60 students from the Bandaraya Kuching Secondary School which formed the Malaysian cultural group. The ceremony concluded with a stage performance performed by Bruneian artists.

=== Participating nations ===
- Brunei (370) (Host)
- Cambodia (65)
- Indonesia (354)
- Laos (41)
- Malaysia (335)
- Myanmar (139)
- Philippines (258)
- Singapore (268)
- Thailand (361)
- Vietnam (174)

=== Sports ===
- Aquatics
  - Diving
  - Swimming
  - Water polo
- Athletics
- Badminton
- Basketball
- Billiards and snooker
- Bowling
- Boxing
- Cycling
- Football
- Golf
- Hockey
- Karate
- Lawn bowls
- Pencak silat
- Sepak takraw
- Shooting
- Squash
- Table tennis
- Taekwondo
- Tennis
- Traditional boat race

== Medal table ==
* Host nation (Brunei)

Rank	Nation	Gold	Silver	Bronze	Total
1	Thailand (THA)	65	48	56	169
2	Malaysia (MAS)	57	46	42	145
3	Indonesia (INA)	45	43	59	147
4	Singapore (SIN)	23	28	46	97
5	Philippines (PHI)	19	27	41	87
6	Vietnam (VIE)	18	20	28	66
7	Brunei (BRU)*	4	13	31	48
8	Myanmar (MYA)	3	10	10	23
9	Laos (LAO)	1	0	3	4
10	Cambodia (CAM)	0	0	0	0
Totals (10 entries)		235	235	316	786

Preceded by Jakarta	Southeast Asian Games; Bandar Seri Begawan; XX Southeast Asian Games (1999)	Succeeded by Kuala Lumpur
